= Water polo at the 2000 Summer Olympics – Women's team rosters =

These are the rosters of all participating teams at the women's water polo tournament at the 2000 Summer Olympics in Sydney. The ten national teams were required to submit squads of 12 players. Additionally, teams could name one alternate player. In the event that a player on the submitted squad list suffered an injury or illness, that player would be able to be replaced by the player in the alternate list.

== Australia ==
The following players represented Australia:

- Naomi Castle
- Joanne Fox
- Bridgette Gusterson
- Simone Hankin
- Yvette Higgins
- Kate Hooper
- Bronwyn Mayer
- Gail Miller
- Melissa Mills
- Debbie Watson
- Liz Weekes
- Danielle Woodhouse
- Taryn Woods

== Canada ==
The following players represented Canada:

- Marie Luc Arpin
- Isabelle Auger
- Johanne Bégin
- Cora Campbell
- Melissa Collins
- Marie-Claude Deslières
- Valérie Dionne
- Ann Dow
- Susan Gardiner
- Waneek Horn-Miller
- Sandra Lizé
- Josée Marsolais
- Jana Salat

== Kazakhstan ==
The following players represented Kazakhstan:

- Rezeda Aleyeva
- Anastasiya Boroda
- Irina Borodavko
- Svetlana Buravova
- Asel Dzhakayeva
- Nataliya Galkina
- Yekaterina Gerzanich
- Tatyana Gubina
- Nataliya Ignatyeva
- Svetlana Korolyova
- Olga Leshchuk
- Larisa Olkhina
- Yuliya Pyryseva

== Netherlands ==
The following players represented the Netherlands:

- Hellen Boering
- Daniëlle de Bruijn
- Edmée Hiemstra
- Karin Kuipers
- Ingrid Leijendekker
- Patricia Megens
- Marjan op den Velde
- Mirjam Overdam
- Heleen Peerenboom
- Karla Plugge
- Carla Quint
- Gillian van den Berg
- Ellen van der Weijden-Bast

== Russia ==
The following players represented Russia:

- Marina Akobiya
- Ekaterina Anikeeva
- Sofia Konukh
- Maria Koroleva
- Natalia Kutuzova
- Svetlana Kuzina
- Tatiana Petrova
- Yuliya Petrova
- Galina Rytova
- Elena Smurova
- Elena Tokun
- Irina Tolkunova
- Ekaterina Vasilieva

== United States ==
The following players represented the United States:

- Robin Beauregard
- Ellen Estes
- Courtney Johnson
- Ericka Lorenz
- Heather Moody
- Bernice Orwig
- Maureen O'Toole
- Nicolle Payne
- Heather Petri
- Kathy Sheehy
- Coralie Simmons
- Julie Swail
- Brenda Villa
