= Water polo at the 2000 Summer Olympics – Women's tournament =

Women's water polo at the Games of the XXVII Olympiad

Tournament details
- Host country: Australia
- City: Sydney
- Venue(s): Ryde Aquatic Leisure Centre, Sydney International Aquatic Centre
- Dates: 16–23 September 2000
- Teams: 6 (from 4 confederations)
- Competitors: 78

Final positions
- Champions: Australia (1st title)
- Runners-up: United States
- Third place: Russia
- Fourth place: Netherlands

Tournament statistics
- Matches: 20
- Goals scored: 245 (12.25 per match)
- Top scorer(s): (Netherlands) Daniëlle de Bruijn (Australia) Bridgette Gusterson (Russia) Sofia Konukh (11 goals in 7 matches)
- Most saves: (Netherlands) Karla Plugge (45 saves in 7 matches)
- Top sprinter(s): (Russia) Tatiana Petrova (16 sprints won in 7 matches)

The women's water polo tournament at the 2000 Summer Olympics in Sydney, Australia, was held from 16 to 23 September 2000, with six teams competing in the debut tournament. The games were held at the Ryde Aquatic Centre and the Sydney Olympic Aquatic Centre. It was the first time in history that women's water polo officially competed at the Summer Olympics.

The tournament's format saw the six teams compete in a round-robin with the top four teams qualifying through to the semi-finals while the fifth and sixth teams competed in the fifth place playoff. From there, the winners of the semis met in the gold medal match while the losers met in the bronze medal match.

At the end of the round-robin, Australia, the Netherlands, Russia and the United States finished in the top four. After the Australians and the Americans each won their semi-final, they met in the final which was played on 23 September 2000. With the match tied at 3–3, Yvette Higgins scored the winning goal with only 1.3 seconds left on the clock to give Australia the gold medal. Russia captured bronze, beating the Netherlands 4–3.

== Background and qualification ==
The women's water polo tournament at the 2000 Summer Olympics was the first time the tournament was held at the Olympic Games. Previous tournaments included the World Aquatics Championships (since 1986) and the World Cup (since 1979). Despite it being held as a demonstration sport at the 1984 Summer Olympics in Los Angeles, women's water polo was not accepted as part of the 2000 Olympics until October 1997.

15 teams attempted to qualify through to the tournament with two qualification paths to the Olympics. The World Cup, which was held in Winnipeg, Canada, where the Netherlands and Canada qualified through as the leading European and American team for the tournament. The final qualifier was held in Palermo, Italy, in April 2000. The top two teams (Russia and the United States) qualified. Kazakhstan, who finished in sixth place, qualified through the spot reserved for Asian teams.

Event	Dates	Hosts	Quota	Qualifier(s)
Host nation	—N/a	—N/a	1	Australia
1999 FINA World Cup	24–29 May 1999	(Canada) Winnipeg	2	Canada
1999 FINA World Cup	24–29 May 1999	(Canada) Winnipeg	2	Netherlands
2000 Women's Olympic Water Polo Qualifying Tournament	22–30 April 2000	(Italy) Palermo	3	Kazakhstan
2000 Women's Olympic Water Polo Qualifying Tournament	22–30 April 2000	(Italy) Palermo	3	Russia
2000 Women's Olympic Water Polo Qualifying Tournament	22–30 April 2000	(Italy) Palermo	3	United States
Total			6	

== Preliminary round ==
=== Summary ===
The tournament began on 16 September 2000, with all six teams competing on the first day. In the first match, Olga Leshchuk scored the opening goal of the tournament for Kazakhstan, but Australia dominated with Bridgette Gusterson scoring three goals and Yvette Higgins two goals as Australia defeated Kazakhstan 9–2. The following match saw Russia and Canada finish with a seven all draw which the Edmonton Journal described as a match like "old style Russia-Canada hockey". The final match of the opening day saw the United States defeat the Netherlands 6–4, despite the Dutch coming back early in the third quarter.

The following day, Australia became the only team to be two for two in the tournament after breaking the three all deadlock with goals from Gusterson and Melissa Mills as they went on to defeat Russia 6–3. The Americans came back from a three goal deficit at the start of the final quarter to secure a goal in the last seconds of the game to finish with a draw with Canada. For the Canadians, the plan to control the shot-clock failed because of errors leading to their second draw of the tournament. The final match of the second day saw the Netherlands defeat Kazakhstan 8–6 with Daniëlle de Bruijn and Marjan op den Velde both scoring three goals in the victory.

Day three of the preliminary round saw the first loss for the Australians, 5–4 to the Dutch. This was despite three goals from Yvette Higgins as the Dutch took the victory at the start of the final quarter. The Americans took top spot in the group after Coralie Simmons scored three goals as they worked their way to a 7–5 win over Russia. Four Canadians scored two goals each in the final match of the day as they romped over Kazakhstan 10–3 to record their first win of the campaign. In the process, they kept Leschuk goalless in the match.

The fourth day of the preliminary round saw the first teams to qualify through to the semi-finals. In the opening match of the day, the Australians defeated the undefeated Americans 7–6 to book a spot in the semis with the United States. In a tense match, the Australians got the victory from a turnover when Bridgette Gusterson scored the winning goal with a long shot in the last thirty seconds of the match. The first half dominance by Russia strengthened their chance of a semi-final as they scored ten goals, five of those being from player advantage situations. This performance led to the biggest victory of the tournament, as Russia won 15–6, knocking Kazakhstan out of the tournament in the process. The Netherlands became the third team to qualify through to the semis after two goals from Danielle de Bruijn and Karin Kuipers secured a 7–4 win over Canada.

The final day of the preliminary round began on 20 September. In the opening match, Australia finished top of the group after defeating the Canadians 9–4 with goalkeeper, Danielle Woodhouse saving nine of the 13 shots for Australia and Simone Hankin scoring three goals in the victory. The following match, Russia book the final spot in the semis with a 6–3 win over the Netherlands, knocking Canada out of the competition in the process. Sofia Konoukh was the top scorer in the match with three goals, as the Russians played with greater tenacity and purpose. In the final match of the preliminary round, the United States took their advantage of power plays, scoring five out of seven attempts as they went to win 9–6 over Kazakhstan.

=== Standings ===
Pos	Team	Pld	W	D	L	GF	GA	GD	Pts	Qualification
1	Australia (H)	5	4	0	1	35	20	+15	8	Semi Finals
2	United States	5	3	1	1	36	30	+6	7	Semi Finals
3	Netherlands	5	3	0	2	27	26	+1	6	Semi Finals
4	Russia	5	2	1	2	36	29	+7	5	Semi Finals
5	Canada	5	1	2	2	33	34	−1	4	
6	Kazakhstan	5	0	0	5	23	51	−28	0	

Source: LA84
Rules for classification: 1) Points; 2) Head-to-head points; 3) Head-to-head goal difference; 4) Head-to-head goals scored; 5) Goal difference.
(H) Hosts

=== Matches ===
16 September 2000; 13:00	Report	Kazakhstan	2–9	Australia	Ryde Aquatic Centre; Referees: Melliar (RSA), Rolf Ludecke (GER)
16 September 2000; 13:00	Report	Score by quarters: 1-2, 1-2, 0-1, 0-4			Ryde Aquatic Centre; Referees: Melliar (RSA), Rolf Ludecke (GER)
16 September 2000; 13:00	Report	two players 1	Goals	Gusterson 3	Ryde Aquatic Centre; Referees: Melliar (RSA), Rolf Ludecke (GER)

16 September 2000; 18:00	Report	Canada	7–7	Russia	Ryde Aquatic Centre; Referees: Ahmet Erhan Tulga (TUR), Patrick Clemenson (FRA)
16 September 2000; 18:00	Report	Score by quarters: 2-3, 0-1, 2-2, 3-1			Ryde Aquatic Centre; Referees: Ahmet Erhan Tulga (TUR), Patrick Clemenson (FRA)
16 September 2000; 18:00	Report	Dow 3	Goals	two players 2	Ryde Aquatic Centre; Referees: Ahmet Erhan Tulga (TUR), Patrick Clemenson (FRA)

16 September 2000; 19:15	Report	Netherlands	4–6	United States	Ryde Aquatic Centre; Referees: Angel Moliner Molins (ESP), Gyorgy Csaszar (HUN)
16 September 2000; 19:15	Report	Score by quarters: 0-2, 1-1, 2-1, 1-2			Ryde Aquatic Centre; Referees: Angel Moliner Molins (ESP), Gyorgy Csaszar (HUN)
16 September 2000; 19:15	Report	de Bruijn 2	Goals	Lorenz 2	Ryde Aquatic Centre; Referees: Angel Moliner Molins (ESP), Gyorgy Csaszar (HUN)

17 September 2000; 13:00	Report	Australia	6–3	Russia	Ryde Aquatic Centre; Referees: Paraskevas Chasekioglou (GRE), Gad Schwartz (ISR)
17 September 2000; 13:00	Report	Score by quarters: 2-1, 1-1, 2-1, 1-0			Ryde Aquatic Centre; Referees: Paraskevas Chasekioglou (GRE), Gad Schwartz (ISR)
17 September 2000; 13:00	Report	two players 2	Goals	three players 1	Ryde Aquatic Centre; Referees: Paraskevas Chasekioglou (GRE), Gad Schwartz (ISR)

17 September 2000; 18:00	Report	United States	8–8	Canada	Ryde Aquatic Centre; Referees: Boris Margeta (SLO), Vlastimil Kratochvil (SVK)
17 September 2000; 18:00	Report	Score by quarters: 3-3, 2-3, 0-2, 3-0			Ryde Aquatic Centre; Referees: Boris Margeta (SLO), Vlastimil Kratochvil (SVK)
17 September 2000; 18:00	Report	Beauregard 3	Goals	Horn-Miller 3	Ryde Aquatic Centre; Referees: Boris Margeta (SLO), Vlastimil Kratochvil (SVK)

17 September 2000; 19:15	Report	Kazakhstan	6–8	Netherlands	Ryde Aquatic Centre; Referees: Dragan Rajevic (YUG), Juan Carlos Menéndez (CUB)
17 September 2000; 19:15	Report	Score by quarters: 2-2, 2-2, 1-2, 1-2			Ryde Aquatic Centre; Referees: Dragan Rajevic (YUG), Juan Carlos Menéndez (CUB)
17 September 2000; 19:15	Report	Leshchuk 3	Goals	two players 3	Ryde Aquatic Centre; Referees: Dragan Rajevic (YUG), Juan Carlos Menéndez (CUB)

18 September 2000; 13:00	Report	Netherlands	5–4	Australia	Ryde Aquatic Centre; Referees: Zeljko Klaric (CRO), Ahmet Erhan Tulga (TUR)
18 September 2000; 13:00	Report	Score by quarters: 2-1, 1-1, 0-2, 2-0			Ryde Aquatic Centre; Referees: Zeljko Klaric (CRO), Ahmet Erhan Tulga (TUR)
18 September 2000; 13:00	Report	de Bruijn 2	Goals	Higgins 3	Ryde Aquatic Centre; Referees: Zeljko Klaric (CRO), Ahmet Erhan Tulga (TUR)

18 September 2000; 18:00	Report	Russia	5–7	United States	Ryde Aquatic Centre; Referees: Renato Dani (ITA), Patrick Clemencon (FRA)
18 September 2000; 18:00	Report	Score by quarters: 1-1, 2-2, 1-3, 1-1			Ryde Aquatic Centre; Referees: Renato Dani (ITA), Patrick Clemencon (FRA)
18 September 2000; 18:00	Report	five players 1	Goals	Simmons 3	Ryde Aquatic Centre; Referees: Renato Dani (ITA), Patrick Clemencon (FRA)

18 September 2000; 19:15	Report	Canada	10–3	Kazakhstan	Ryde Aquatic Centre; Referees: Rolf Ludecke (GER), Vahid Moradi (IRI)
18 September 2000; 19:15	Report	Score by quarters: 3-1, 3-0, 1-2, 3-0			Ryde Aquatic Centre; Referees: Rolf Ludecke (GER), Vahid Moradi (IRI)
18 September 2000; 19:15	Report	four players 2	Goals	three players 1	Ryde Aquatic Centre; Referees: Rolf Ludecke (GER), Vahid Moradi (IRI)

19 September 2000; 13:00	Report	United States	6–7	Australia	Ryde Aquatic Centre; Referees: Paraskevas Chasekioglou (GRE), Boris Margeta (SLO)
19 September 2000; 13:00	Report	Score by quarters: 2-2, 1-0, 2-4, 1-1			Ryde Aquatic Centre; Referees: Paraskevas Chasekioglou (GRE), Boris Margeta (SLO)
19 September 2000; 13:00	Report	two players 2	Goals	Gusteron 2	Ryde Aquatic Centre; Referees: Paraskevas Chasekioglou (GRE), Boris Margeta (SLO)

19 September 2000; 18:00	Report	Kazakhstan	6–15	Russia	Ryde Aquatic Centre; Referees: Gad Schwartz (ISR), Vlastimil Kratochvil (SVK)
19 September 2000; 18:00	Report	Score by quarters: 1-5, 1-5, 3-3, 1-2			Ryde Aquatic Centre; Referees: Gad Schwartz (ISR), Vlastimil Kratochvil (SVK)
19 September 2000; 18:00	Report	Aleyeva 2	Goals	two players 3	Ryde Aquatic Centre; Referees: Gad Schwartz (ISR), Vlastimil Kratochvil (SVK)

19 September 2000; 19:15	Report	Netherlands	7–4	Canada	Ryde Aquatic Centre; Referees: Angel Moliner Molins (ESP), Renato Dani (ITA)
19 September 2000; 19:15	Report	Score by quarters: 3-0, 0-2, 2-2, 2-0			Ryde Aquatic Centre; Referees: Angel Moliner Molins (ESP), Renato Dani (ITA)
19 September 2000; 19:15	Report	two players 2	Goals	Begin 2	Ryde Aquatic Centre; Referees: Angel Moliner Molins (ESP), Renato Dani (ITA)

20 September 2000; 13:00	Report	Canada	4–9	Australia	Ryde Aquatic Centre; Referees: Rolf Ludecke (GER), Patrick Clemencon (FRA)
20 September 2000; 13:00	Report	Score by quarters: 0-1, 2-4, 1-2, 1-2			Ryde Aquatic Centre; Referees: Rolf Ludecke (GER), Patrick Clemencon (FRA)
20 September 2000; 13:00	Report	four players 1	Goals	Hankin 3	Ryde Aquatic Centre; Referees: Rolf Ludecke (GER), Patrick Clemencon (FRA)

20 September 2000; 18:00	Report	Russia	6–3	Netherlands	Ryde Aquatic Centre; Referees: Ahmet Erhan Tulga (TUR), Gyorgy Csaszar (HUN)
20 September 2000; 18:00	Report	Score by quarters: 1-2, 1-1, 3-0, 1-0			Ryde Aquatic Centre; Referees: Ahmet Erhan Tulga (TUR), Gyorgy Csaszar (HUN)
20 September 2000; 18:00	Report	Konoukh 3	Goals	Kuipers 2	Ryde Aquatic Centre; Referees: Ahmet Erhan Tulga (TUR), Gyorgy Csaszar (HUN)

20 September 2000; 19:15	Report	Kazakhstan	6–9	United States	Ryde Aquatic Centre; Referees: Zeljko Klaric (CRO), Vahid Moradi (IRI)
20 September 2000; 19:15	Report	Score by quarters: 1-2, 1-3, 2-3, 2-1			Ryde Aquatic Centre; Referees: Zeljko Klaric (CRO), Vahid Moradi (IRI)
20 September 2000; 19:15	Report	two players 2	Goals	Villa 4	Ryde Aquatic Centre; Referees: Zeljko Klaric (CRO), Vahid Moradi (IRI)

== Final round ==
=== Bracket ===
Semi-finals
22 September
Australia	7
Russia	6
22 September
United States	6
Netherlands	5

Final
23 September
Australia	4
United States	3
Bronze medal
23 September
Russia	4
Netherlands	3

=== Semifinals ===
The women's tournament semifinals took place on 22 September. The opening semi saw the Australians take on Russia. During the opening half, the Australians struggled across both ends of the pool as the Russians opened up a 4–3 lead at half-time. The Russians seeming to be in control and with five minutes left, held firm with a 6–4 lead. But three late goals, including two in the last ninety seconds, booked the Australians a spot in the final with a 7–6 victory. At the end of the match, coach Istvan Gorgenyi responded saying, "the girls made a miracle happen with their hearts".

In the other semi-final, the Americans fought hard as they knocked out the then-World Cup champions, the Netherlands 6–5. This was due partly to two goals from Maureen O'Toole and Coralie Simmons. At the end of the match, United States coach Guy Baker said, "we know we're going to get a medal, a lot of this is indescribable".

22 September 2000; 13:00	Report	Australia	7–6	Russia	Ryde Aquatic Centre; Referees: Rolf Helmut Ludecke (GER), Boris Margeta (SLO)
22 September 2000; 13:00	Report	Score by quarters: 2-3, 1-1, 1-2, 3-0			Ryde Aquatic Centre; Referees: Rolf Helmut Ludecke (GER), Boris Margeta (SLO)
22 September 2000; 13:00	Report	Mayer 3	Goals	Tokoun 2	Ryde Aquatic Centre; Referees: Rolf Helmut Ludecke (GER), Boris Margeta (SLO)

22 September 2000; 19:15	Report	United States	6–5	Netherlands	Ryde Aquatic Centre; Referees: Renato Dani (ITA), Patrick Clemencon (FRA)
22 September 2000; 19:15	Report	Score by quarters: 3-2, 1-3, 1-0, 1-0			Ryde Aquatic Centre; Referees: Renato Dani (ITA), Patrick Clemencon (FRA)
22 September 2000; 19:15	Report	two players 2	Goals	two players 2	Ryde Aquatic Centre; Referees: Renato Dani (ITA), Patrick Clemencon (FRA)

=== 5th place match ===
The battle for fifth place took place on the same day as the semi-finals, with the Canadians coming out on top in the match with a goal by Jana Salat in the second period of overtime, giving Canada the fifth spot.

22 September 2000; 18:00	Report	Canada	9–8 (OT)	Kazakhstan	Ryde Aquatic Centre; Referees: Andrew Jay Takata (USA), Phillip Bower (AUS)
22 September 2000; 18:00	Report	Score by quarters: 1-1, 3-3, 2-3, 2-1 OT: 1-0, 0–0			Ryde Aquatic Centre; Referees: Andrew Jay Takata (USA), Phillip Bower (AUS)
22 September 2000; 18:00	Report	four players 2	Goals	Pyryseva 3	Ryde Aquatic Centre; Referees: Andrew Jay Takata (USA), Phillip Bower (AUS)

=== Bronze medal match ===
The second-to-last match of the tournament saw the Russians take home the bronze medal as they defeated the Netherlands 4–3. Two goals in the last two minutes of the match from Sofia Konoukh and Ioulia Petrova brought Russia back from a 3–2 deficit to the bronze medal. For the Netherlands, this meant they had failed to win a medal in a major water polo competition across 17 tournaments in the World Cup and the World Championships.

23 September 2000; 20:00	Report	Russia	4–3	Netherlands	Sydney Olympic Aquatic Centre; Referees: Ahmet Erhan Tulga (TUR), Paraskevas Chasekioglou (GRE)
23 September 2000; 20:00	Report	Score by quarters: 0-2, 1-0, 1-1, 2-0			Sydney Olympic Aquatic Centre; Referees: Ahmet Erhan Tulga (TUR), Paraskevas Chasekioglou (GRE)
23 September 2000; 20:00	Report	Konoukh 2	Goals	Kuipers 2	Sydney Olympic Aquatic Centre; Referees: Ahmet Erhan Tulga (TUR), Paraskevas Chasekioglou (GRE)

=== Gold medal match ===
With a crowd of 17,000 watching the gold medal match, including Australian prime minister John Howard, the Australians and the Americans battled in a final which went undecided until the last few seconds. The Americans had opened up a one-goal lead in the first and second quarter before the Australians leveled the match at two all after three quarters.

Goalkeeping from both Bernice Orwig and Liz Weekes kept the match level until the final two minutes when Naomi Castle gave the Australians the lead with a goal at a player advantage. Brenda Villa tied the match at three all with only 13 seconds left in the match as the Americans took the advantage of a foul by the Australians. In the final seconds, a foul was called on Julie Swail of the U.S., and with 1.3 seconds left on the clock, the Australians scored the match winning goal from Yvette Higgins to give Australia not only the win but the first gold medal in women's water polo.

23 September 2000; 21:15	Report	Australia	4–3	United States	Sydney Olympic Aquatic Centre; Referees: Renato Dani (ITA), Vladimir Prikhodko (KAZ)
23 September 2000; 21:15	Report	Score by quarters: 1-1, 0-1, 1-0, 2-1			Sydney Olympic Aquatic Centre; Referees: Renato Dani (ITA), Vladimir Prikhodko (KAZ)
23 September 2000; 21:15	Report	four players 1	Goals	Villa 2	Sydney Olympic Aquatic Centre; Referees: Renato Dani (ITA), Vladimir Prikhodko (KAZ)

== Final ranking ==
At the end of the tournament, Australia recorded their fourth gold medal in a major water polo competition. Their three previous gold medals were won in 1984, 1995 (both FINA World Cups) and the 1986 World Aquatic Championships.

Rank	Team
Gold medal	Australia
Silver medal	United States
Bronze medal	Russia
4	Netherlands
5	Canada
6	Kazakhstan

== Medalists ==
Gold	Silver	Bronze
Australia Naomi Castle; Joanne Fox; Bridgette Gusterson; Simone Hankin; Yvette Higgins; Kate Hooper; Bronwyn Mayer-Smith; Gail Miller; Melissa Mills; Debbie Watson (C); Liz Weekes (GK); Danielle Woodhouse (GK); Taryn Woods Head coach: István Görgényi	United States Robin Beauregard; Ellen Estes; Courtney Johnson; Ericka Lorenz; Heather Moody; Maureen O'Toole; Bernice Orwig (GK); Nicolle Payne (GK); Heather Petri; Kathy Sheehy; Coralie Simmons; Julie Swail (C); Brenda Villa Head coach: Guy Baker	Russia Galina Rytova; Irina Tolkunova; Maria Koroleva; Marina Akobiya; Natalia Kutuzova; Sofia Konukh; Svetlana Kuzina; Tatiana Petrova; Ekaterina Anikeeva; Yekaterina Vasilyeva; Elena Smurova; Elena Tokun; Yuliya Petrova Head coach: Sergei Frolov

== Sources ==
- PDF documents in the LA84 Foundation Digital Library:
  - Official Results Book – 2000 Olympic Games – Water Polo (download, archive)
- Water polo on the Olympedia website
  - Water polo at the 2000 Summer Olympics (women's tournament)
- Water polo on the Sports Reference website
  - Water polo at the 2000 Summer Games (women's tournament) (archived)
