= List of Olympic champions in women's water polo =

This is a list of Olympic champions in women's water polo since the inaugural official edition in 2000.

== Abbreviations ==
Rk	Rank	Ref	Reference			Cap No.	Water polo cap number
Pos	Playing position	FP	Field player	GK	Goalkeeper	ISHOF	International Swimming Hall of Fame
L/R	Handedness	L	Left-handed	R	Right-handed	Oly debut	Olympic debut in water polo
(C)	Captain	p.	page	pp.	pages		

== History ==
Women's water polo became an Olympic sport at the 2000 Sydney Olympics.

As of 2016, women's teams from Europe, North America and Oceania won all five gold medals.

The United States is the most successful country in the women's Olympic water polo tournament, with three Olympic gold medals. The team won three gold medals in 2012,2016, and 2020, becoming the first water polo team to win three consecutive Olympic gold medals.

Spain women's national team is current the Olympic champion.

Legend

- D – Debut
- C – Champions
- C – Olympic winning streak (winning three or more Olympic titles in a row)
- – Hosts

Champions	2000	2004	2008	2012	2016	2020	2024	Total
Australia	C							1
Italy		C						1
Netherlands	D		C					1
United States	D			C	C	C		3
Spain							C	1
Champions	2000	2004	2008	2012	2016	2020	2024	Total

== Team statistics ==
=== Results ===
The following table shows results of Olympic champions in women's water polo by tournament. Last updated: 7 August 2021.

Legend

- 6 – Winning 6 matches during the tournament
- 4 – Drawing 4 matches during the tournament
- 2 – Losing 2 matches during the tournament
- 100.0% – Winning all matches during the tournament
- Team – Olympic winning streak (winning three or more Olympic titles in a row)
- Team – Host team

Abbreviation

- MP – Matches played
- W – Won
- D – Drawn
- L – Lost
- GF – Goals for
- GA – Goals against
- GD – Goals difference
- GF/MP – Goals for per match
- GA/MP – Goals against per match
- GD/MP – Goals difference per match

Results of champions by tournament
#	Women's tournament	Champions	MP	W	D	L	Win %	GF	GA	GD	GF/MP	GA/MP	GD/MP
1	Sydney 2000	Australia (1st title)	7	6	0	1	85.7%	46	29	17	6.571	4.143	2.429
2	Athens 2004	Italy (1st title)	6	5	0	1	83.3%	44	33	11	7.333	5.500	1.833
3	Beijing 2008	Netherlands (1st title)	6	4	0	2	66.7%	57	53	4	9.500	8.833	0.667
4	London 2012	United States (1st title)	6	5	1	0	83.3%	58	48	10	9.667	8.000	1.667
5	Rio 2016	United States (2nd title)	6	6	0	0	100.0%	73	32	41	12.167	5.333	6.833
6	Tokyo 2020	United States (3rd title)	7	6	0	1	85.7%	109	47	62	15.571	6.714	8.857
7	Paris 2024	Spain (1st title)	7	7	0	0	100.0%	94	67	27	13.428	9.571	3.857
#	Women's tournament	Total	45	39	1	5	86.6%	481	309	172	10.688	6.866	3.822
#	Women's tournament	Champions	MP	W	D	L	Win %	GF	GA	GD	GF/MP	GA/MP	GD/MP

Sources:

- Official Results Books (PDF): 2000 (p. 96), 2004 (p. 72), 2008 (p. 71), 2012 (p. 368), 2016 (p. 218), 2020 (p. 273);
- Olympedia: 2000–2020 (women's tournaments).

The following table shows women's teams that won all matches during the Olympic tournament.

Winning all matches during the tournament
#	Year	Champions	MP	W	D	L	Win %
1	2016	United States (2nd title)	6	6	0	0	100.0%
2	2024	Spain	7	7	0	0	100.0%

The following tables show records of goals for per match.

Top 3 most goals for per match
Rk	Year	Champions	MP	GF	GF/MP
1	2020	United States (3rd title)	7	109	15.571
2	2024	Spain (1st title)	7	94	13.428
3	2016	United States (2nd title)	6	73	12.167

Top 3 fewest goals for per match
Rk	Year	Champions	MP	GF	GF/MP
1	2000	Australia (1st title)	7	46	6.571
2	2004	Italy (1st title)	6	44	7.333
3	2008	Netherlands (1st title)	6	57	9.500

Historical progression of records: Goals for per match
Goals for per match	Achievement	Year	Champions	Date of winning gold	Duration of record
6.571	Set record	2000	Australia (1st title)	23 September 2000	3 years, 338 days
7.333	Broke record	2004	Italy (1st title)	26 August 2004	3 years, 361 days
9.500	Broke record	2008	Netherlands (1st title)	21 August 2008	3 years, 354 days
9.667	Broke record	2012	United States (1st title)	9 August 2012	4 years, 10 days
12.167	Broke record	2016	United States (2nd title)	19 August 2016	4 years, 353 days
15.571	Broke record	2020	United States (3rd title)	7 August 2021	5 years, 101 days

The following tables show records of goals against per match.

Top 3 most goals against per match
Rk	Year	Champions	MP	GA	GA/MP
1	2024	Spain (1st title)	7	67	9.571
2	2008	Netherlands (1st title)	6	53	8.833
3	2012	United States (1st title)	6	48	8.000

Top 3 fewest goals against per match
Rk	Year	Champions	MP	GA	GA/MP
1	2000	Australia (1st title)	7	29	4.143
2	2016	United States (2nd title)	6	32	5.333
3	2004	Italy (1st title)	6	33	5.500

The following tables show records of goals difference per match.

Top 3 most goals difference per match
Rk	Year	Champions	MP	GD	GD/MP
1	2020	United States (3rd title)	7	62	8.857
2	2016	United States (2nd title)	6	41	6.833
3	2000	Australia (1st title)	7	17	2.429

Top 3 fewest goals difference per match
Rk	Year	Champions	MP	GD	GD/MP
1	2008	Netherlands (1st title)	6	4	0.667
2	2012	United States (1st title)	6	10	1.667
3	2004	Italy (1st title)	6	11	1.833

=== Squads ===
The following table shows number of players and average age, height and weight of Olympic champions in women's water polo by tournament. Last updated: 7 August 2021.

Legend

- Team – Olympic winning streak
- Team – Winning all matches during the tournament
- Team – Host team

Winning squads by tournament
#	Women's tournament	Champions	Players	Returning Olympians		Average		
#	Women's tournament	Champions	Number	Number	%	Age	Height	Weight
1	Sydney 2000	Australia (1st title)	13	0	0.0%	26 years, 215 days	1.78 m (5 ft 10 in)	71 kg (157 lb)
2	Athens 2004	Italy (1st title)	13	0	0.0%	28 years, 301 days	1.73 m (5 ft 8 in)	67 kg (148 lb)
3	Beijing 2008	Netherlands (1st title)	13	2	15.4%	25 years, 248 days	1.77 m (5 ft 10 in)	70 kg (154 lb)
4	London 2012	United States (1st title)	13	8	61.5%	26 years, 96 days	1.80 m (5 ft 11 in)	77 kg (170 lb)
5	Rio 2016	United States (2nd title)	13	4	30.8%	23 years, 200 days	1.80 m (5 ft 11 in)	77 kg (170 lb)
6	Tokyo 2020	United States (3rd title)	13	8	61.5%	26 years, 33 days	1.79 m (5 ft 10 in)	
6	Paris 2024	Spain (1st title)	13	8	61.5%			
#	Women's tournament	Champions	Number	Number	%	Age	Height	Weight
#	Women's tournament	Champions	Players	Returning Olympians		Average		

Sources:

- Official Results Books (PDF): 2000 (p. 96), 2004 (p. 73), 2008 (p. 72), 2012 (p. 369), 2016 (p. 219), 2020 (p. 274);
- Olympedia: 2000–2020 (women's tournaments).

The following tables show records of the number of returning Olympians.

Records – number of returning Olympians (in descending order)
Rk	Year	Champions	Players	Returning Olympians	
Rk	Year	Champions	Number	Number	%
1	2012	United States (1st title)	13	8	61.5%
1	2020	United States (3rd title)	13	8	61.5%
3	2016	Spain (1st title)	13	8	61.5%

Records – number of returning Olympians (in ascending order)
Rk	Year	Champions	Players	Returning Olympians	
Rk	Year	Champions	Number	Number	%
1	2000	Australia (1st title)	13	0	0.0%
1	2004	Italy (1st title)	13	0	0.0%
3	2008	Netherlands (1st title)	13	2	15.4%

The following tables show records of average age.

Top 3 oldest winning squads
Rk	Year	Champions	Average age
1	2004	Italy (1st title)	28 years, 301 days
2	2000	Australia (1st title)	26 years, 215 days
3	2012	United States (1st title)	26 years, 96 days

Top 3 youngest winning squads
Rk	Year	Champions	Average age
1	2016	United States (2nd title)	23 years, 200 days
2	2008	Netherlands (1st title)	25 years, 248 days
3	2020	United States (3rd title)	26 years, 33 days

The following tables show records of average height.

Top 3 tallest winning squads
Rk	Year	Champions	Average height
1	2012	United States (1st title)	1.80 m (5 ft 11 in)
1	2016	United States (2nd title)	1.80 m (5 ft 11 in)
3	2020	United States (3rd title)	1.79 m (5 ft 10 in)

Top 3 shortest winning squads
Rk	Year	Champions	Average height
1	2004	Italy (1st title)	1.73 m (5 ft 8 in)
2	2008	Netherlands (1st title)	1.77 m (5 ft 10 in)
3	2000	Australia (1st title)	1.78 m (5 ft 10 in)

Historical progression of records: Average height
Average height	Achievement	Year	Champions	Date of winning gold	Duration of record
1.78 m (5 ft 10 in)	Set record	2000	Australia (1st title)	23 September 2000	11 years, 321 days
1.80 m (5 ft 11 in)	Broke record	2012	United States (1st title)	9 August 2012	14 years, 99 days
1.80 m (5 ft 11 in)	Tied record	2016	United States (2nd title)	19 August 2016	14 years, 99 days

The following tables show records of average weight.

Top 3 heaviest winning squads
Rk	Year	Champions	Average weight
1	2012	United States (1st title)	77 kg (170 lb)
1	2016	United States (2nd title)	77 kg (170 lb)
3	2000	Australia (1st title)	71 kg (157 lb)

Top 3 lightest winning squads
Rk	Year	Champions	Average weight
1	2004	Italy (1st title)	67 kg (148 lb)
2	2008	Netherlands (1st title)	70 kg (154 lb)
3	2000	Australia (1st title)	71 kg (157 lb)

Historical progression of records: Average weight
Average weight	Achievement	Year	Champions	Date of winning gold	Duration of record
71 kg (157 lb)	Set record	2000	Australia (1st title)	23 September 2000	11 years, 321 days
77 kg (170 lb)	Broke record	2012	United States (1st title)	9 August 2012	14 years, 99 days
77 kg (170 lb)	Tied record	2016	United States (2nd title)	19 August 2016	14 years, 99 days

=== Olympic and world champions (teams) ===
The following table is pre-sorted by number of Olympic titles (in descending order), number of world titles (in descending order), name of the team (in ascending order), respectively. Last updated: 27 August2024.

As of 2024, there are five women's national water polo teams that won gold medals at the Summer Olympics and the World Aquatics Championships.

Legend

- Year^{*} – As host team

#	Champions	Olympic title	World title	Total	First	Last
1	United States	3 (2012–2016–2020)	8 (2003, 2007–2009, 2015–2017–2019–2022, 2024)	11	2003	2024
2	Italy	1 (2004)	2 (1998–2001)	3	1998	2004
2	Netherlands	1 (2008)	2 (1991, 2023)	3	1991	2023
5	Australia	1 (2000^{*})	1 (1986)	2	1986	2000
5	Spain	1 (2024)	1 (2013^{*})	2	2013	2024

== Player statistics ==
=== Age records ===
The following tables show the oldest and youngest female Olympic champions in water polo. Last updated: 18 January 2021.

Legend

- Team – Host team

Top 10 oldest female Olympic champions in water polo
Rk	Player	Age of winning gold	Women's team	Pos	Date of birth	Date of winning gold
1	Gillian van den Berg	36 years, 348 days	Netherlands	FP	8 September 1971	21 August 2008
2	Debbie Watson	34 years, 361 days	Australia	FP	28 September 1965	23 September 2000
3	Carmela Allucci	34 years, 217 days	Italy	FP	22 January 1970	26 August 2004
4	Heather Petri	34 years, 57 days	United States	FP	13 June 1978	9 August 2012
5	Giusi Malato	33 years, 48 days	Italy	FP	9 July 1971	26 August 2004
6	Brenda Villa	32 years, 113 days	United States	FP	18 April 1980	9 August 2012
7	Francesca Conti	32 years, 97 days	Italy	GK	21 May 1972	26 August 2004
8	Alexandra Araújo	32 years, 44 days	Italy	FP	13 July 1972	26 August 2004
9	Danielle Woodhouse	31 years, 244 days	Australia	GK	23 January 1969	23 September 2000
10	Melania Grego	31 years, 68 days	Italy	FP	19 June 1973	26 August 2004
Rk	Player	Age of winning gold	Women's team	Pos	Date of birth	Date of winning gold

Top 10 youngest female Olympic champions in water polo
Rk	Player	Age of winning gold	Women's team	Pos	Date of birth	Date of winning gold
1	Aria Fischer	17 years, 170 days	United States	FP	2 March 1999	19 August 2016
2	Maddie Musselman	18 years, 64 days	United States	FP	16 June 1998	19 August 2016
3	Elena Gigli	19 years, 48 days	Italy	GK	9 July 1985	26 August 2004
4	Maggie Steffens	19 years, 66 days	United States	FP	4 June 1993	9 August 2012
5	Makenzie Fischer	19 years, 143 days	United States	FP	29 March 1997	19 August 2016
6	Ilse van der Meijden	19 years, 304 days	Netherlands	GK	22 October 1988	21 August 2008
7	Annika Dries	20 years, 181 days	United States	FP	10 February 1992	9 August 2012
8	Joanne Fox	21 years, 103 days	Australia	FP	12 June 1979	23 September 2000
9	Ashleigh Johnson	21 years, 342 days	United States	GK	12 September 1994	19 August 2016
10	Iefke van Belkum	22 years, 30 days	Netherlands	FP	22 July 1986	21 August 2008
Rk	Player	Age of winning gold	Women's team	Pos	Date of birth	Date of winning gold

=== Multiple gold medalists ===
The following tables are pre-sorted by year of receiving the last Olympic gold medal (in ascending order), year of receiving the first Olympic gold medal (in ascending order), name of the player (in ascending order), respectively. Last updated: 27 February 2024.

Two female athletes won three Olympic gold medals in water polo.

Legend

- Year^{*} – As host team

Female athletes who won three Olympic gold medals in water polo
Year	Player	Date of birth	Height	Women's team	Pos	Olympic titles	Age of first/last
2020	Melissa Seidemann	26 June 1990	1.83 m (6 ft 0 in)	United States	FP	2012–2016–2020	22/31
2020	Maggie Steffens	4 June 1993	1.73 m (5 ft 8 in)	United States	FP	2012–2016–2020	19/28

Eight female athletes won two Olympic gold medals in water polo.

Legend

- Year^{*} – As host team

Female athletes who won two Olympic gold medals in water polo
Year	Player	Date of birth	Height	Women's team	Pos	Olympic titles	Age of first/last
2016	Kami Craig	21 July 1987	1.81 m (5 ft 11 in)	United States	FP	2012–2016	25/29
2016	Courtney Mathewson	14 September 1986	1.71 m (5 ft 7 in)	United States	FP	2012–2016	25/29
2020	Rachel Fattal	10 December 1993	1.73 m (5 ft 8 in)	United States	FP	2016–2020	22/27
2020	Aria Fischer	2 March 1999	1.83 m (6 ft 0 in)	United States	FP	2016–2020	17/22
2020	Makenzie Fischer	29 March 1997	1.86 m (6 ft 1 in)	United States	FP	2016–2020	19/24
2020	Kaleigh Gilchrist	16 May 1992	1.76 m (5 ft 9 in)	United States	FP	2016–2020	24/29
2020	Ashleigh Johnson	12 September 1994	1.86 m (6 ft 1 in)	United States	GK	2016–2020	21/26
2020	Maddie Musselman	16 June 1998	1.81 m (5 ft 11 in)	United States	FP	2016–2020	18/23

=== Olympic and world champions (players) ===
The following tables are pre-sorted by number of Olympic titles (in descending order), number of world titles (in descending order), year of receiving the last gold medal (in ascending order), year of receiving the first gold medal (in ascending order), name of the player (in ascending order), respectively. Last updated: 27 February 2024.

As of 2024, there are thirty five female athletes who won gold medals in water polo at the Summer Olympics and the World Aquatics Championships.

Legend

- Year^{*} – As host team

Female water polo players who won two or more Olympic titles and one or more world titles
#	Player	Birth	Height	Pos	Summer Olympics			World Aquatics Championships			Total titles	ISHOF member
#	Player	Birth	Height	Pos	Age	Women's team	Title	Age	Women's team	Title	Total titles	ISHOF member
1	Maggie Steffens	1993	1.73 m (5 ft 8 in)	FP	19–23–28	United States	2012–2016–2020	22–24–26–29, 30	United States	2015–2017–2019–2022, 2024	8	
2	Melissa Seidemann	1990	1.83 m (6 ft 0 in)	FP	22–26–31	United States	2012–2016–2020	25–27–29	United States	2015–2017–2019	6	
3	Rachel Fattal	1993	1.73 m (5 ft 8 in)	FP	22–27	United States	2016–2020	21–23–25–28, 30	United States	2015–2017–2019–2022, 2024	7	
3	Maddie Musselman	1998	1.81 m (5 ft 11 in)	FP	18–23	United States	2016–2020	17–19–21–24, 25	United States	2015–2017–2019–2022, 2024	7	
5	Kaleigh Gilchrist	1992	1.76 m (5 ft 9 in)	FP	24–29	United States	2016–2020	23, 27–30, 31	United States	2015, 2019–2022, 2024	6	
5	Ashleigh Johnson	1994	1.86 m (6 ft 1 in)	GK	21–26	United States	2016–2020	20, 24–27, 29	United States	2015, 2019–2022, 2024	6	
7	Kami Craig	1987	1.81 m (5 ft 11 in)	FP	25–29	United States	2012–2016	19–22, 28	United States	2007–2009, 2015	5	
8	Makenzie Fischer	1997	1.86 m (6 ft 1 in)	FP	19–24	United States	2016–2020	18–20–22	United States	2015–2017–2019	5	
9	Aria Fischer	1999	1.83 m (6 ft 0 in)	FP	17–22	United States	2016–2020	18–20	United States	2017–2019	4	
10	Courtney Mathewson	1986	1.71 m (5 ft 7 in)	FP	25–29	United States	2012–2016	28	United States	2015	3	

Female water polo players who won an Olympic title and two or more world titles
#	Player	Birth	Height	Pos	Summer Olympics			World Aquatics Championships			Total titles	ISHOF member
#	Player	Birth	Height	Pos	Age	Women's team	Title	Age	Women's team	Title	Total titles	ISHOF member
11	Amanda Longan	1997	1.85 m (6 ft 1 in)	GK	24	United States	2020	20–22–25, 27	United States	2017–2019–2022, 2024	5	
12	Heather Petri	1978	1.80 m (5 ft 11 in)	FP	34	United States	2012	25, 28–31	United States	2003, 2007–2009	4	2023
12	Brenda Villa	1980	1.63 m (5 ft 4 in)	FP	32	United States	2012	23, 26–29	United States	2003, 2007–2009	4	2018
14	Kiley Neushul	1993	1.73 m (5 ft 8 in)	FP	23	United States	2016	22–24–26	United States	2015–2017–2019	4	
15	Alys Williams	1994	1.81 m (5 ft 11 in)	FP	27	United States	2020	21–23–25	United States	2015–2017–2019	4	
16	Carmela Allucci	1970	1.67 m (5 ft 6 in)	FP	34	Italy	2004	27–31	Italy	1998–2001	3	
16	Alexandra Araújo	1972	1.67 m (5 ft 6 in)	FP	32	Italy	2004	25–29	Italy	1998–2001	3	
16	Francesca Conti	1972	1.79 m (5 ft 10 in)	GK	32	Italy	2004	25–29	Italy	1998–2001	3	
16	Melania Grego	1973	1.71 m (5 ft 7 in)	FP	31	Italy	2004	24–28	Italy	1998–2001	3	
16	Giusi Malato	1971	1.70 m (5 ft 7 in)	FP	33	Italy	2004	26–30	Italy	1998–2001	3	
16	Martina Miceli	1973	1.68 m (5 ft 6 in)	FP	30	Italy	2004	24–27	Italy	1998–2001	3	
16	Maddalena Musumeci	1976	1.70 m (5 ft 7 in)	FP	28	Italy	2004	21–25	Italy	1998–2001	3	
23	Elizabeth Armstrong	1983	1.88 m (6 ft 2 in)	GK	29	United States	2012	24–26	United States	2007–2009	3	
23	Lauren Wenger	1984	1.91 m (6 ft 3 in)	FP	28	United States	2012	23–25	United States	2007–2009	3	
23	Elsie Windes	1985	1.78 m (5 ft 10 in)	FP	27	United States	2012	21–24	United States	2007–2009	3	
26	Paige Hauschild	1999	1.78 m (5 ft 10 in)	FP	21	United States	2020	17–19	United States	2017–2019	3	
27	Stephania Haralabidis	1995	1.80 m (5 ft 11 in)	FP	26	United States	2020	24–27	United States	2019–2022	3	
#	Player	Birth	Height	Pos	Age	Women's team	Title	Age	Women's team	Title	Total titles	ISHOF member
#	Player	Birth	Height	Pos	Summer Olympics			World Aquatics Championships			Total titles	ISHOF member

Female water polo players who won an Olympic title and a world title
#	Player	Birth	Height	Pos	Summer Olympics			World Aquatics Championships			Total titles	ISHOF member
#	Player	Birth	Height	Pos	Age	Women's team	Title	Age	Women's team	Title	Total titles	ISHOF member
28	Debbie Watson	1965	1.78 m (5 ft 10 in)	FP	34	Australia	2000^{*}	20	Australia	1986	2	2008
29	Noémi Tóth	1976	1.80 m (5 ft 11 in)	FP	28	Italy	2004	18	Hungary	1994	2	
30	Silvia Bosurgi	1979	1.65 m (5 ft 5 in)	FP	25	Italy	2004	22	Italy	2001	2	
30	Tania Di Mario	1979	1.67 m (5 ft 6 in)	FP	25	Italy	2004	22	Italy	2001	2	
32	Kelly Rulon	1984	1.78 m (5 ft 10 in)	FP	27	United States	2012	24	United States	2009	2	
32	Jessica Steffens	1987	1.83 m (6 ft 0 in)	FP	25	United States	2012	22	United States	2009	2	
34	Samantha Hill	1992	1.83 m (6 ft 0 in)	GK	24	United States	2016	23	United States	2015	2	
35	Jamie Neushul	1995	1.68 m (5 ft 6 in)	FP	26	United States	2020	22	United States	2017	2	
#	Player	Birth	Height	Pos	Age	Women's team	Title	Age	Women's team	Title	Total titles	ISHOF member
#	Player	Birth	Height	Pos	Summer Olympics			World Aquatics Championships			Total titles	ISHOF member

=== Olympic champion families ===
The following tables are pre-sorted by year of receiving the Olympic gold medal (in ascending order), name of the player (in ascending order), respectively. Last updated: 27 February 2024.

Legend

- Year^{*} – As host team

Relationship	Family	Player	Date of birth	Height	Women's team	Pos	Olympic title	Age	Note	Ref
Two sisters		Bridgette Gusterson	7 February 1973	1.80 m (5 ft 11 in)	Australia	FP	2000^{*}	27	Two sisters in an Olympic tournament	
Two sisters		Danielle Woodhouse	23 January 1969	1.73 m (5 ft 8 in)	Australia	GK	2000^{*}	31	Two sisters in an Olympic tournament	
Two sisters	Steffens	Jessica Steffens	7 April 1987	1.83 m (6 ft 0 in)	United States	FP	2012	25	Two sisters in an Olympic tournament	
Two sisters	Steffens	Maggie Steffens	4 June 1993	1.73 m (5 ft 8 in)	United States	FP	2012	19	Two sisters in an Olympic tournament	
Two sisters	Steffens	Maggie Steffens	4 June 1993	1.73 m (5 ft 8 in)	United States	FP	2016–2020	23–28		
Two sisters	Neushul	Kiley Neushul	5 March 1993	1.73 m (5 ft 8 in)	United States	FP	2016	23		
Two sisters	Neushul	Jamie Neushul	12 May 1995	1.68 m (5 ft 6 in)	United States	FP	2020	26		
Two sisters	Fischer	Aria Fischer	2 March 1999	1.83 m (6 ft 0 in)	United States	FP	2016–2020	17–22	Two sisters in an Olympic tournament	
Two sisters	Fischer	Makenzie Fischer	29 March 1997	1.86 m (6 ft 1 in)	United States	FP	2016–2020	19–24	Two sisters in an Olympic tournament	

Relationship	Player	Date of birth	Height	Women's team	Pos	Olympic title	Age	Note	Ref
Two cousins	Bronwyn Mayer	3 July 1974	1.76 m (5 ft 9 in)	Australia	FP	2000^{*}	26	Two cousins in an Olympic tournament	
Two cousins	Taryn Woods	12 August 1975	1.75 m (5 ft 9 in)	Australia	FP	2000^{*}	25	Two cousins in an Olympic tournament	

== Coach statistics ==
=== Most successful coaches ===
The following table is pre-sorted by number of Olympic gold medals (in descending order), year of winning the last Olympic gold medal (in ascending order), name of the coach (in ascending order), respectively. Last updated: 27 February 2024.

There is only one coach who led women's national water polo team to win two or more Olympic gold medals.

Adam Krikorian coached the United States women's national team to three consecutive Olympic gold medals in 2012, 2016 and 2020.

Legend

- Year^{*} – As host team

Head coaches who led women's national teams to win two or more Olympic gold medals
Rk	Head coach	Nationality	Birth	Age	Women's team	Olympic titles	Total	Ref
1	Adam Krikorian	United States	1974	38–47	United States	2012–2016–2020	3	

=== Olympic and world champions (coaches) ===
The following table is pre-sorted by number of Olympic titles (in descending order), number of world titles (in descending order), year of winning the last gold medal (in ascending order), year of winning the first gold medal (in ascending order), name of the coach (in ascending order), respectively. Last updated: 27 February 2024.

As of 2024, there are two head coaches who led women's national teams to win gold medals in water polo at the Summer Olympics and the World Aquatics Championships.

Legend

- Year^{*} – As host team

Head coaches who led women's national teams to win gold medals in water polo at the Summer Olympics and the World Aquatics Championships
#	Coach	Nationality	Birth	Summer Olympics			World Aquatics Championships			Total titles	ISHOF member	Ref
#	Coach	Nationality	Birth	Age	Women's team	Title	Age	Women's team	Title	Total titles	ISHOF member	Ref
1	Adam Krikorian	United States	1974	38–47	United States	2012–2016–2020	35, 41–47, 49	United States	2009, 2015–2017–2019–2022, 2024	9		
2	Pierluigi Formiconi	Italy	1948	56	Italy	2004	49–53	Italy	1998–2001	3		

== Champions by tournament ==
=== 2020 (United States, 3rd title) ===
- Edition of women's tournament: 6th
- Host city: Tokyo, Japan
- Number of participating teams: 10
- Competition format: Round-robin pools advanced teams to classification matches
- Champion: United States (3rd title, 1st place in preliminary B group

Match	Round	Date	Cap color	Opponent	Result	Goals for	Goals against	Goals diff.
Match 1/7	Preliminary round – Group B	24 July 2021	Blue	Japan	Won			
Match 2/7	Preliminary round – Group B	26 July 2021	White	China	Won			
Match 3/7	Preliminary round – Group B	28 July 2021	Blue	Hungary	Lost			
Match 4/7	Preliminary round – Group B	30 July 2021	White	Russia	Won			
Match 5/7	Quarter-finals	3 August 2021	Blue	Canada	Won			
Match 6/7	Semi-finals	5 August 2021	Blue	Russia	Won			
Match 7/7	Gold medal match	7 August 2021	Blue	Spain	Won			
Total	Matches played: 7 • Wins: 6 • Ties: 0 • Defeats: 1 • Win %: 85.7%							

Source: Official Results Books (PDF): 2021

=== 2016 (United States, 2nd title) ===
* Edition of women's tournament: 5th

- Host city: Rio de Janeiro, Brazil
- Number of participating teams: 8
- Competition format: Round-robin pools advanced teams to classification matches
- Champion: United States (2nd title; 1st place in preliminary B group)

Match	Round	Date	Cap color	Opponent	Result	Goals for	Goals against	Goals diff.
Match 1/6	Preliminary round – Group B	9 August 2016	Blue	Spain	Won	11	4	7
Match 2/6	Preliminary round – Group B	11 August 2016	Blue	China	Won	12	4	8
Match 3/6	Preliminary round – Group B	13 August 2016	Blue	Hungary	Won	11	6	5
Match 4/6	Quarter-finals	15 August 2016	Blue	Brazil	Won	13	3	10
Match 5/6	Semi-finals	17 August 2016	Blue	Hungary	Won	14	10	4
Match 6/6	Gold medal match	19 August 2016	White	Italy	Won	12	5	7
Total	Matches played: 6 • Wins: 6 • Ties: 0 • Defeats: 0 • Win %: 100%					73	32	41

Source: Official Results Books (PDF): 2016 (pp. 142, 148, 158, 168, 176, 184).

- Head coach: (United States) Adam Krikorian (2nd title as head coach)
- Assistant coaches: (United States) Daniel Klatt, (United States) Chris Oeding

Roster
Cap No.	Player	Pos	L/R	Height	Weight	Date of birth	Age of winning gold	Oly debut	ISHOF member
1	Samantha Hill	GK	R	1.83 m (6 ft 0 in)	89 kg (196 lb)	8 June 1992	24 years, 72 days	Yes	
2	Maddie Musselman	FP	R	1.81 m (5 ft 11 in)	65 kg (143 lb)	16 June 1998	18 years, 64 days	Yes	
3	Melissa Seidemann	FP	R	1.83 m (6 ft 0 in)	104 kg (229 lb)	26 June 1990	26 years, 54 days	No	
4	Rachel Fattal	FP	R	1.73 m (5 ft 8 in)	65 kg (143 lb)	10 December 1993	22 years, 253 days	Yes	
5	Caroline Clark	FP	R	1.88 m (6 ft 2 in)	72 kg (159 lb)	28 June 1990	26 years, 52 days	Yes	
6	Maggie Steffens (C)	FP	R	1.73 m (5 ft 8 in)	74 kg (163 lb)	4 June 1993	23 years, 76 days	No	
7	Courtney Mathewson	FP	R	1.71 m (5 ft 7 in)	69 kg (152 lb)	14 September 1986	29 years, 340 days	No	
8	Kiley Neushul	FP	R	1.73 m (5 ft 8 in)	65 kg (143 lb)	5 March 1993	23 years, 167 days	Yes	
9	Aria Fischer	FP	R	1.83 m (6 ft 0 in)	78 kg (172 lb)	2 March 1999	17 years, 170 days	Yes	
10	Kaleigh Gilchrist	FP	R	1.76 m (5 ft 9 in)	77 kg (170 lb)	16 May 1992	24 years, 95 days	Yes	
11	Makenzie Fischer	FP	R	1.86 m (6 ft 1 in)	74 kg (163 lb)	29 March 1997	19 years, 143 days	Yes	
12	Kami Craig	FP	R	1.81 m (5 ft 11 in)	88 kg (194 lb)	21 July 1987	29 years, 29 days	No	
13	Ashleigh Johnson	GK	R	1.86 m (6 ft 1 in)	81 kg (179 lb)	12 September 1994	21 years, 342 days	Yes	
Average				1.80 m (5 ft 11 in)	77 kg (170 lb)	1 February 1993	23 years, 200 days		
Coach	Adam Krikorian					22 July 1974	42 years, 28 days		

Note: Aria Fischer and Makenzie Fischer are sisters.
Sources:

- Official Results Books (PDF): 2016 (p. 219);
- ISHOF.

Abbreviation

- MP – Matches played
- Min – Minutes
- G – Goals
- Sh – Shots
- AS – Assists
- TF – Turnover fouls
- ST – Steals
- BL – Blocked shots
- SP – Sprints
- 20S – 20 seconds exclusion
- DE – Double exclusion
- Pen – Penalty
- EX – Exclusion

Statistics
Cap No.	Player	Pos	MP	Minutes played		Goals/Shots			AS	TF	ST	BL	Sprints			Personal fouls			
Cap No.	Player	Pos	MP	Min	%	G	Sh	%	AS	TF	ST	BL	Won	SP	%	20S	DE	Pen	EX
1	Samantha Hill	GK	6	15	7.8%														
2	Maddie Musselman	FP	6	116	60.4%	12	25	48.0%		7	4	3				4	1		
3	Melissa Seidemann	FP	6	95	49.5%	3	11	27.3%	1	8	3	2				5			
4	Rachel Fattal	FP	6	146	76.0%	4	14	28.6%	5	8	9	3	17	23	73.9%	2			
5	Caroline Clark	FP	6	62	32.3%	2	6	33.3%	1	1	4					6			
6	Maggie Steffens (C)	FP	6	145	75.5%	17	24	70.8%	5	9	1	3	1	1	100%	6		1	1
7	Courtney Mathewson	FP	6	96	50.0%	7	11	63.6%	4	1	1	1							
8	Kiley Neushul	FP	6	149	77.6%	10	20	50.0%	2	7	5	1				1			
9	Aria Fischer	FP	6	69	35.9%	0	5	0.0%		5	1	1				2			
10	Kaleigh Gilchrist	FP	6	99	51.6%	6	13	46.2%	5	5	2	5				3		1	
11	Makenzie Fischer	FP	6	95	49.5%	7	23	30.4%	4	5	3	1				8		1	1
12	Kami Craig	FP	6	81	42.2%	5	7	71.4%	1	4	3	1				2			
13	Ashleigh Johnson	GK	6	177	92.2%	0	4	0.0%	3	2	17								
Team										16									
Total			6	192	100%	73	163	44.8%	31	78	53	21	18	24	75.0%	39	1	3	2
Against						32	156	20.5%	13	90	41	8	6	24	25.0%	40	1	5	0

Cap No.	Player	Pos	Saves/Shots		
Cap No.	Player	Pos	Saves	Shots	%
1	Samantha Hill	GK	6	10	60.0%
13	Ashleigh Johnson	GK	51	79	64.6%
Total			57	89	64.0%

Source: Official Results Books (PDF): 2016 (p. 218).

=== 2012 (United States, 1st title) ===
* Edition of women's tournament: 4th

- Host city: London, United Kingdom
- Number of participating teams: 8
- Competition format: Round-robin pools advanced teams to classification matches
- Champion: United States (1st title; 2nd place in preliminary A group)

Match	Round	Date	Cap color	Opponent	Result	Goals for	Goals against	Goals diff.
Match 1/6	Preliminary round – Group A	30 July 2012	Blue	Hungary	Won	14	13	1
Match 2/6	Preliminary round – Group A	1 August 2012	Blue	Spain	Drawn	9	9	0
Match 3/6	Preliminary round – Group A	3 August 2012	Blue	China	Won	7	6	1
Match 4/6	Quarter-finals	5 August 2012	White	Italy	Won	9	6	3
Match 5/6	Semi-finals	7 August 2012	White	Australia	Won	11	9	2
Match 6/6	Gold medal match	9 August 2012	White	Spain	Won	8	5	3
Total	Matches played: 6 • Wins: 5 • Ties: 1 • Defeats: 0 • Win %: 83.3%					58	48	10

Source: Official Results Books (PDF): 2012 (pp. 294, 300, 310, 312, 324, 334).

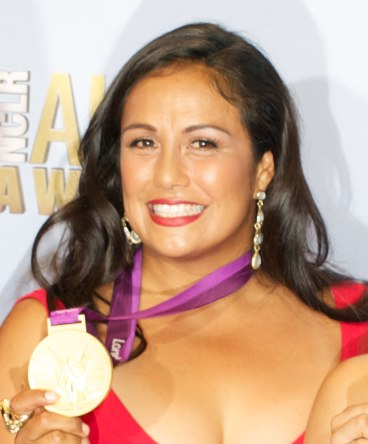
Brenda Villa was the captain of the United States at the 2012 Olympics.

- Head coach: (United States) Adam Krikorian (1st title as head coach)
- Assistant coaches: (United States) Heather Moody, (United States) Daniel Klatt

Roster
Cap No.	Player	Pos	L/R	Height	Weight	Date of birth	Age of winning gold	Oly debut	ISHOF member
1	Elizabeth Armstrong	GK	R	1.88 m (6 ft 2 in)	77 kg (170 lb)	31 January 1983	29 years, 191 days	No	
2	Heather Petri	FP	R	1.80 m (5 ft 11 in)	73 kg (161 lb)	13 June 1978	34 years, 57 days	No	
3	Melissa Seidemann	FP	R	1.83 m (6 ft 0 in)	104 kg (229 lb)	26 June 1990	22 years, 44 days	Yes	
4	Brenda Villa (C)	FP	R	1.63 m (5 ft 4 in)	79 kg (174 lb)	18 April 1980	32 years, 113 days	No	2018
5	Lauren Wenger	FP	R	1.91 m (6 ft 3 in)	77 kg (170 lb)	11 March 1984	28 years, 151 days	No	
6	Maggie Steffens	FP	R	1.73 m (5 ft 8 in)	70 kg (154 lb)	4 June 1993	19 years, 66 days	Yes	
7	Courtney Mathewson	FP	R	1.71 m (5 ft 7 in)	71 kg (157 lb)	14 September 1986	25 years, 330 days	Yes	
8	Jessica Steffens	FP	R	1.83 m (6 ft 0 in)	75 kg (165 lb)	7 April 1987	25 years, 124 days	No	
9	Elsie Windes	FP	R	1.78 m (5 ft 10 in)	70 kg (154 lb)	17 June 1985	27 years, 53 days	No	
10	Kelly Rulon	FP	R	1.78 m (5 ft 10 in)	61 kg (134 lb)	16 August 1984	27 years, 359 days	No	
11	Annika Dries	FP	R	1.85 m (6 ft 1 in)	88 kg (194 lb)	10 February 1992	20 years, 181 days	Yes	
12	Kami Craig	FP	R	1.81 m (5 ft 11 in)	88 kg (194 lb)	21 July 1987	25 years, 19 days	No	
13	Tumua Anae	GK	R	1.80 m (5 ft 11 in)	70 kg (154 lb)	16 October 1988	23 years, 298 days	Yes	
Average				1.80 m (5 ft 11 in)	77 kg (170 lb)	5 May 1986	26 years, 96 days		
Coach	Adam Krikorian					22 July 1974	38 years, 18 days		

Note: Jessica Steffens and Maggie Steffens are sisters.
Sources:

- Official Results Books (PDF): 2012 (p. 369);
- ISHOF.

Abbreviation

- MP – Matches played
- Min – Minutes
- G – Goals
- Sh – Shots
- AS – Assists
- TF – Turnover fouls
- ST – Steals
- BL – Blocked shots
- SP – Sprints
- 20S – 20 seconds exclusion
- DE – Double exclusion
- Pen – Penalty
- EX – Exclusion

Statistics
Cap No.	Player	Pos	MP	Minutes played		Goals/Shots			AS	TF	ST	BL	Sprints			Personal fouls			
Cap No.	Player	Pos	MP	Min	%	G	Sh	%	AS	TF	ST	BL	Won	SP	%	20S	DE	Pen	EX
1	Elizabeth Armstrong	GK	6	198	100%					1									
2	Heather Petri	FP	6	61	30.8%	1	12	8.3%	2	3		1	1	2	50.0%	2			
3	Melissa Seidemann	FP	6	95	48.0%	7	20	35.0%	1	5	1	1				8	2	1	2
4	Brenda Villa (C)	FP	6	153	77.3%	6	24	25.0%	12	4	4	5				2	1		
5	Lauren Wenger	FP	6	161	81.3%	2	11	18.2%	6	8	4	10	1	13	7.7%	2			
6	Maggie Steffens	FP	6	157	79.3%	21	27	77.8%	8	8	10	2				7		3	
7	Courtney Mathewson	FP	6	95	48.0%	7	21	33.3%		1	4	1				1			
8	Jessica Steffens	FP	6	83	41.9%	1	4	25.0%	2	6	2	2				14		1	3
9	Elsie Windes	FP	6	98	49.5%	1	8	12.5%	5	6	2	3				11		3	3
10	Kelly Rulon	FP	6	112	56.6%	4	12	33.3%	5	5	1	1	4	11	36.4%	2			
11	Annika Dries	FP	6	65	32.8%	2	5	40.0%	1	11	1	2				2			
12	Kami Craig	FP	6	108	54.5%	6	9	66.7%	2	17	2	1				2			
13	Tumua Anae	GK	6	0	0.0%														
Team										7									
Total			6	198	100%	58	153	37.9%	44	82	31	29	6	26	23.1%	53	3	8	8
Against						48	184	26.1%	31	65	42	14	20	26	76.9%	61	3	4	4

Cap No.	Player	Pos	Saves/Shots		
Cap No.	Player	Pos	Saves	Shots	%
1	Elizabeth Armstrong	GK	53	101	52.5%
13	Tumua Anae	GK			
Total			53	101	52.5%

Source: Official Results Books (PDF): 2012 (p. 368).

=== 2008 (Netherlands, 1st title) ===
* Edition of women's tournament: 3rd

- Host city: Beijing, China
- Number of participating teams: 8
- Competition format: Round-robin pools advanced teams to classification matches
- Champion: Netherlands (1st title; 3rd place in preliminary B group)

Match	Round	Date	Cap color	Opponent	Result	Goals for	Goals against	Goals diff.
Match 1/6	Preliminary round – Group B	11 August 2008	Blue	Hungary	Lost	9	11	-2
Match 2/6	Preliminary round – Group B	13 August 2008	Blue	Greece	Won	9	6	3
Match 3/6	Preliminary round – Group B	15 August 2008	White	Australia	Lost	9	10	-1
Match 4/6	Quarter-finals	17 August 2008	Blue	Italy	Won	13	11	2
Match 5/6	Semi-finals	19 August 2008	Blue	Hungary	Won	8	7	1
Match 6/6	Gold medal match	21 August 2008	Blue	United States	Won	9	8	1
Total	Matches played: 6 • Wins: 4 • Ties: 0 • Defeats: 2 • Win %: 66.7%					57	53	4

Source: Official Results Books (PDF): 2008 (pp. 17, 23, 25, 33, 37, 43).

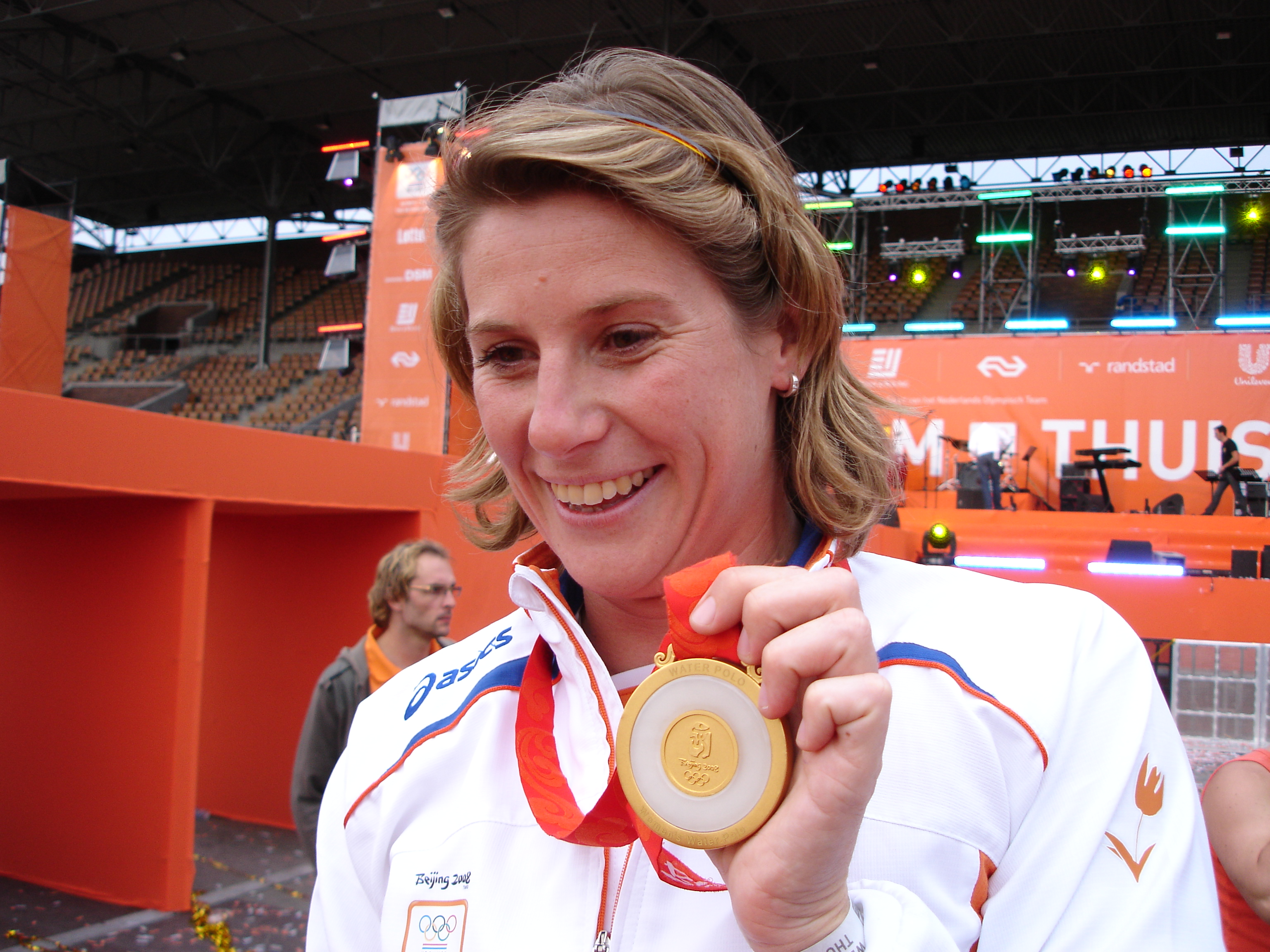
Daniëlle de Bruijn scored 17 goals at the 2008 Olympics, including seven goals in the gold medal match, helping the Netherlands win gold.

- Head coach: (Netherlands) Robin van Galen (1st title as head coach)
- Assistant coach: (Netherlands) Ilse Sindorf

Roster
Cap No.	Player	Pos	L/R	Height	Weight	Date of birth	Age of winning gold	Oly debut	ISHOF member
1	Ilse van der Meijden	GK	R	1.85 m (6 ft 1 in)	71 kg (157 lb)	22 October 1988	19 years, 304 days	Yes	
2	Yasemin Smit (C)	FP	R	1.78 m (5 ft 10 in)	70 kg (154 lb)	21 November 1984	23 years, 274 days	Yes	
3	Mieke Cabout	FP	R	1.82 m (6 ft 0 in)	70 kg (154 lb)	30 March 1986	22 years, 144 days	Yes	
4	Biurakn Hakhverdian	FP	R	1.72 m (5 ft 8 in)	65 kg (143 lb)	4 October 1985	22 years, 322 days	Yes	
5	Marieke van den Ham	FP	L	1.69 m (5 ft 7 in)	80 kg (176 lb)	21 January 1983	25 years, 213 days	Yes	
6	Daniëlle de Bruijn	FP	L	1.72 m (5 ft 8 in)	68 kg (150 lb)	13 February 1978	30 years, 190 days	No	
7	Iefke van Belkum	FP	R	1.85 m (6 ft 1 in)	75 kg (165 lb)	22 July 1986	22 years, 30 days	Yes	
8	Noeki Klein	FP	R	1.79 m (5 ft 10 in)	80 kg (176 lb)	28 April 1983	25 years, 115 days	Yes	
9	Gillian van den Berg	FP	R	1.73 m (5 ft 8 in)	66 kg (146 lb)	8 September 1971	36 years, 348 days	No	
10	Alette Sijbring	FP	R	1.74 m (5 ft 9 in)	68 kg (150 lb)	20 March 1982	26 years, 154 days	Yes	
11	Rianne Guichelaar	FP	L	1.74 m (5 ft 9 in)	63 kg (139 lb)	16 August 1983	25 years, 5 days	Yes	
12	Simone Koot	FP	R	1.73 m (5 ft 8 in)	65 kg (143 lb)	12 November 1980	27 years, 283 days	Yes	
13	Meike de Nooy	GK	R	1.85 m (6 ft 1 in)	73 kg (161 lb)	2 May 1983	25 years, 111 days	Yes	
Average				1.77 m (5 ft 10 in)	70 kg (154 lb)	17 December 1982	25 years, 248 days		
Coach	Robin van Galen								

Sources:

- Official Results Books (PDF): 2008 (p. 72);
- ISHOF.

Abbreviation

- MP – Matches played
- Min – Minutes
- G – Goals
- Sh – Shots
- AS – Assists
- TF – Turnover fouls
- ST – Steals
- BL – Blocked shots
- SP – Sprints
- 20S – 20 seconds exclusion
- Pen – Penalty
- EX – Exclusion

Statistics
Cap No.	Player	Pos	MP	Minutes played		Goals/Shots			AS	TF	ST	BL	Sprints			Personal fouls		
Cap No.	Player	Pos	MP	Min	%	G	Sh	%	AS	TF	ST	BL	Won	SP	%	20S	Pen	EX
1	Ilse van der Meijden	GK	6	198	100%	0	1	0.0%		1	3						1	
2	Yasemin Smit (C)	FP	6	131	66.2%	2	12	16.7%	4	14	5	3				10		1
3	Mieke Cabout	FP	6	178	89.9%	10	44	22.7%	1	10	9	3	0	2	0.0%	5	2	
4	Biurakn Hakhverdian	FP	6	30	15.2%	0	1	0.0%		5	2					1		
5	Marieke van den Ham	FP	6	106	53.5%	9	20	45.0%	1	4	4					5		
6	Daniëlle de Bruijn	FP	6	177	89.4%	17	33	51.5%	2	5	4	3	15	22	68.2%	9		1
7	Iefke van Belkum	FP	6	189	95.5%	10	36	27.8%		18	7	7				7		
8	Noeki Klein	FP	6	12	6.1%					3								
9	Gillian van den Berg	FP	6	125	63.1%	4	9	44.4%		5	3					1		
10	Alette Sijbring	FP	6	92	46.5%	4	18	22.2%	1	4	1	2				7	2	1
11	Rianne Guichelaar	FP	6	97	49.0%	1	13	7.7%	1	4	3					3		
12	Simone Koot	FP	6	51	25.8%	0	1	0.0%		2	3		0	2	0.0%			
13	Meike de Nooy	GK	6	0	0.0%													
Team										12								
Total			6	198	100%	57	188	30.3%	10	87	44	18	15	26	57.7%	48	5	3
Against						53	159	33.3%	16	95	41	26	11	26	42.3%	53	3	5

Cap No.	Player	Pos	Saves/Shots		
Cap No.	Player	Pos	Saves	Shots	%
1	Ilse van der Meijden	GK	45	98	45.9%
13	Meike de Nooy	GK			
Total			45	98	45.9%

Source: Official Results Books (PDF): 2008 (p. 71).

=== 2004 (Italy, 1st title) ===
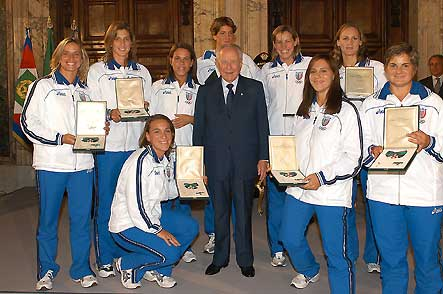
Several members of the Italy women's national water polo team with Italian President Carlo Azeglio Ciampi after winning the Olympic gold in 2004.

- Edition of women's tournament: 2nd
- Host city: Athens, Greece
- Number of participating teams: 8
- Competition format: Round-robin pools advanced teams to classification matches
- Champion: Italy (1st title; 2nd place in preliminary A group)

Match	Round	Date	Cap color	Opponent	Result	Goals for	Goals against	Goals diff.
Match 1/6	Preliminary round – Group A	16 August 2004	Blue	Australia	Lost	5	6	-1
Match 2/6	Preliminary round – Group A	18 August 2004	Blue	Greece	Won	7	2	5
Match 3/6	Preliminary round – Group A	20 August 2004	White	Kazakhstan	Won	8	6	2
Match 4/6	Quarter-finals	22 August 2004	White	Hungary	Won	8	5	3
Match 5/6	Semi-finals	24 August 2004	Blue	United States	Won	6	5	1
Match 6/6	Gold medal match	26 August 2004	Blue	Greece	Won	10	9	1
Total	Matches played: 6 • Wins: 5 • Ties: 0 • Defeats: 1 • Win %: 83.3%					44	33	11

Source: Official Results Books (PDF): 2004 (pp. 4, 10, 12, 32, 38, 42).

- Head coach: (Italy) Pierluigi Formiconi (1st title as head coach)
- Assistant coach: (Italy) Mauro Maugeri

Roster
Cap No.	Player	Pos	L/R	Height	Weight	Date of birth	Age of winning gold	Oly debut	ISHOF member
1	Francesca Conti	GK	R	1.79 m (5 ft 10 in)	71 kg (157 lb)	21 May 1972	32 years, 97 days	Yes	
2	Martina Miceli	FP	R	1.68 m (5 ft 6 in)	65 kg (143 lb)	22 October 1973	30 years, 309 days	Yes	
3	Carmela Allucci (C)	FP	R	1.67 m (5 ft 6 in)	60 kg (132 lb)	22 January 1970	34 years, 217 days	Yes	
4	Silvia Bosurgi	FP	R	1.65 m (5 ft 5 in)	61 kg (134 lb)	17 April 1979	25 years, 131 days	Yes	
5	Elena Gigli	GK	R	1.90 m (6 ft 3 in)	70 kg (154 lb)	9 July 1985	19 years, 48 days	Yes	
6	Emanuela Zanchi	FP	R	1.83 m (6 ft 0 in)	65 kg (143 lb)	17 October 1977	26 years, 314 days	Yes	
7	Tania Di Mario	FP	R	1.67 m (5 ft 6 in)	59 kg (130 lb)	4 May 1979	25 years, 114 days	Yes	
8	Cinzia Ragusa	FP	R	1.72 m (5 ft 8 in)	70 kg (154 lb)	24 May 1977	27 years, 94 days	Yes	
9	Giusi Malato	FP	R	1.70 m (5 ft 7 in)	77 kg (170 lb)	9 July 1971	33 years, 48 days	Yes	
10	Alexandra Araújo	FP	R	1.67 m (5 ft 6 in)	67 kg (148 lb)	13 July 1972	32 years, 44 days	Yes	
11	Maddalena Musumeci	FP	R	1.70 m (5 ft 7 in)	63 kg (139 lb)	26 March 1976	28 years, 153 days	Yes	
12	Melania Grego	FP	R	1.71 m (5 ft 7 in)	72 kg (159 lb)	19 June 1973	31 years, 68 days	Yes	
13	Noémi Tóth	FP	R	1.80 m (5 ft 11 in)	67 kg (148 lb)	7 June 1976	28 years, 80 days	Yes	
Average				1.73 m (5 ft 8 in)	67 kg (148 lb)	30 October 1975	28 years, 301 days		
Coach	Pierluigi Formiconi								

Sources:

- Official Results Books (PDF): 2004 (p. 73);
- ISHOF.

Abbreviation

- MP – Matches played
- Min – Minutes
- G – Goals
- Sh – Shots
- AS – Assists
- TF – Turnover fouls
- ST – Steals
- BL – Blocked shots
- SP – Sprints
- 20S – 20 seconds exclusion
- Pen – Penalty
- EX – Exclusion

Statistics
Cap No.	Player	Pos	MP	Minutes played		Goals/Shots			AS	TF	ST	BL	Sprints			Personal fouls		
Cap No.	Player	Pos	MP	Min	%	G	Sh	%	AS	TF	ST	BL	Won	SP	%	20S	Pen	EX
1	Francesca Conti	GK	6	172	98.9%					1	2							
2	Martina Miceli	FP	6	170	97.7%	9	25	36.0%	2	4	8	4				5	1	1
3	Carmela Allucci (C)	FP	6	83	47.7%	1	8	12.5%	3	1	3	1				3		
4	Silvia Bosurgi	FP	6	40	23.0%	2	7	28.6%	1	1						3		
5	Elena Gigli	GK	6	2	1.1%													
6	Emanuela Zanchi	FP	6	163	93.7%	4	10	40.0%		5	3	3	2	10	20.0%	6		
7	Tania Di Mario	FP	6	145	83.3%	14	27	51.9%	5	12			7	16	43.8%	7		1
8	Cinzia Ragusa	FP	6	82	47.1%	2	4	50.0%		3	1	3				6		
9	Giusi Malato	FP	6	119	68.4%	3	13	23.1%	1	20	3	1				4		
10	Alexandra Araújo	FP	6	55	31.6%	2	5	40.0%		7	1					3		
11	Maddalena Musumeci	FP	6	66	37.9%	2	3	66.7%		3	3					8		1
12	Melania Grego	FP	6	83	47.7%	4	14	28.6%	1	1	1					8		1
13	Noémi Tóth	FP	6	39	22.4%	1	5	20.0%		1						3		
Total			6	174	100%	44	121	36.4%	13	59	25	12	9	26	34.6%	56	1	4
Against						33	129	25.6%	5	45	42	16	17	26	65.4%	49	3	5

Cap No.	Player	Pos	Saves/Shots		
Cap No.	Player	Pos	Saves	Shots	%
1	Francesca Conti	GK	39	72	54.2%
5	Elena Gigli	GK			
Total			39	72	54.2%

Source: Official Results Books (PDF): 2004 (p. 72).

=== 2000 (Australia, 1st title) ===
* Edition of women's tournament: 1st

- Host city: Sydney, Australia
- Number of participating teams: 6
- Competition format: Round-robin pools advanced teams to classification matches
- Champion: Australia (1st title; 1st place in preliminary A group)

Match	Round	Date	Cap color	Opponent	Result	Goals for	Goals against	Goals diff.
Match 1/7	Preliminary round – Group A	16 September 2000	Blue	Kazakhstan	Won	9	2	7
Match 2/7	Preliminary round – Group A	17 September 2000	White	Russia	Won	6	3	3
Match 3/7	Preliminary round – Group A	18 September 2000	Blue	Netherlands	Lost	4	5	-1
Match 4/7	Preliminary round – Group A	19 September 2000	Blue	United States	Won	7	6	1
Match 5/7	Preliminary round – Group A	20 September 2000	Blue	Canada	Won	9	4	5
Match 6/7	Semi-finals	22 September 2000	White	Russia	Won	7	6	1
Match 7/7	Gold medal match	23 September 2000	White	United States	Won	4	3	1
Total	Matches played: 7 • Wins: 6 • Ties: 0 • Defeats: 1 • Win %: 85.7%					46	29	17

Source: Official Results Books (PDF): 2000 (pp. 103, 106, 108, 111, 115, 119, 121).

- Head coach: (Hungary) István Görgényi (1st title as head coach)

Roster
Cap No.	Player	Pos	L/R	Height	Weight	Date of birth	Age of winning gold	Oly debut	ISHOF member
1	Liz Weekes	GK	R	1.80 m (5 ft 11 in)	68 kg (150 lb)	22 September 1971	29 years, 1 day	Yes	
2	Yvette Higgins	FP	R	1.73 m (5 ft 8 in)	73 kg (161 lb)	5 January 1978	22 years, 262 days	Yes	
3	Gail Miller	FP	R	1.80 m (5 ft 11 in)	65 kg (143 lb)	30 November 1976	23 years, 298 days	Yes	
4	Naomi Castle	FP	R	1.80 m (5 ft 11 in)	72 kg (159 lb)	29 May 1974	26 years, 117 days	Yes	
5	Bronwyn Mayer	FP	R	1.76 m (5 ft 9 in)	65 kg (143 lb)	3 July 1974	26 years, 82 days	Yes	
6	Simone Hankin	FP	R	1.82 m (6 ft 0 in)	80 kg (176 lb)	28 February 1973	27 years, 208 days	Yes	
7	Danielle Woodhouse	GK	R	1.73 m (5 ft 8 in)	68 kg (150 lb)	23 January 1969	31 years, 244 days	Yes	
8	Kate Hooper	FP	R	1.77 m (5 ft 10 in)	73 kg (161 lb)	26 February 1978	22 years, 210 days	Yes	
9	Debbie Watson	FP	R	1.78 m (5 ft 10 in)	71 kg (157 lb)	28 September 1965	34 years, 361 days	Yes	2008
10	Taryn Woods	FP	R	1.75 m (5 ft 9 in)	76 kg (168 lb)	12 August 1975	25 years, 42 days	Yes	
11	Bridgette Gusterson	FP	R	1.80 m (5 ft 11 in)	74 kg (163 lb)	7 February 1973	27 years, 229 days	Yes	2017
12	Joanne Fox	FP	L	1.82 m (6 ft 0 in)	72 kg (159 lb)	12 June 1979	21 years, 103 days	Yes	
13	Melissa Mills	FP	R	1.80 m (5 ft 11 in)	67 kg (148 lb)	26 December 1973	26 years, 272 days	Yes	
Average				1.78 m (5 ft 10 in)	71 kg (157 lb)	21 February 1974	26 years, 215 days		
Coach	István Görgényi			1.87 m (6 ft 2 in)		2 November 1946	53 years, 326 days		

Note: Bridgette Gusterson and Danielle Woodhouse are sisters; Bronwyn Mayer and Taryn Woods are cousins.
Sources:

- Official Results Books (PDF): 2000 (p. 96);
- Olympedia: 2000 (women's tournament);
- ISHOF.

Abbreviation

- MP – Matches played
- G – Goals
- Sh – Shots
- AS – Assists
- TF – Turnover fouls
- ST – Steals
- BL – Blocked shots
- SP – Sprints
- 20S – 20 seconds exclusion
- Pen – Penalty
- EX – Exclusion

Statistics
Cap No.	Player	Pos	MP	Goals/Shots			AS	TF	ST	BL	Sprints			Personal fouls		
Cap No.	Player	Pos	MP	G	Sh	%	AS	TF	ST	BL	Won	SP	%	20S	Pen	EX
1	Liz Weekes	GK	7						3							
2	Yvette Higgins	FP	7	8	18	44.4%	3	5	2					2		
3	Gail Miller	FP	7	2	4	50.0%		3	9	3	4	5	80.0%	3		
4	Naomi Castle	FP	7	3	22	13.6%	6	2	15	3				8		
5	Bronwyn Mayer	FP	7	6	11	54.5%	3	3	9		6	8	75.0%	3		
6	Simone Hankin	FP	7	4	18	22.2%	3	8	6					7		
7	Danielle Woodhouse	GK	7						1							
8	Kate Hooper	FP	7													
9	Debbie Watson	FP	7	3	10	30.0%	1	2	6	3				4		
10	Taryn Woods	FP	7	3	22	13.6%	1	1	4					10		
11	Bridgette Gusterson	FP	7	11	30	36.7%	6	4	3					3		
12	Joanne Fox	FP	7	2	10	20.0%	2		9	2				9		
13	Melissa Mills	FP	7	4	16	25.0%	5	1	5	1	14	15	93.3%	3		
Total			7	46	161	28.6%	30	29	72	12	24	28	85.7%	52	0	0
Against				29	116	25.0%	12	43	50	10	4	28	14.3%	51	5	0

Cap No.	Player	Pos	Saves/Shots		
Cap No.	Player	Pos	Saves	Shots	%
1	Liz Weekes	GK	21	46	45.7%
7	Danielle Woodhouse	GK	11	15	73.3%
Total			32	61	52.5%

Source: Official Results Books (PDF): 2000 (p. 96).

== See also ==
- Water polo at the Summer Olympics
- Lists of Olympic water polo records and statistics
  - List of men's Olympic water polo tournament records and statistics
  - List of women's Olympic water polo tournament records and statistics
  - List of Olympic champions in men's water polo
  - National team appearances in the men's Olympic water polo tournament
  - National team appearances in the women's Olympic water polo tournament
  - List of players who have appeared in multiple men's Olympic water polo tournaments
  - List of players who have appeared in multiple women's Olympic water polo tournaments
  - List of Olympic medalists in water polo (men)
  - List of Olympic medalists in water polo (women)
  - List of men's Olympic water polo tournament top goalscorers
  - List of women's Olympic water polo tournament top goalscorers
  - List of men's Olympic water polo tournament goalkeepers
  - List of women's Olympic water polo tournament goalkeepers
  - List of Olympic venues in water polo
- List of world champions in men's water polo
- List of world champions in women's water polo

== Sources ==
=== Official Results Books (IOC) ===
PDF documents in the LA84 Foundation Digital Library:

- Official Results Book – 2000 Olympic Games – Water Polo (download, archive)
- Official Results Book – 2004 Olympic Games – Water Polo (download, archive)
- Official Results Book – 2008 Olympic Games – Water Polo (download, archive)

PDF documents on the FINA website:

- Official Results Book – 2012 Olympic Games – Diving, Swimming, Synchronised Swimming, Water Polo (archive) (pp. 284–507)

PDF documents in the Olympic World Library:

- Official Results Book – 2016 Olympic Games – Water Polo (archive)

PDF documents on the International Olympic Committee website:

- Official Results Book – 2020 Olympic Games – Water Polo (archive)
- Official Results Book – 2024 Olympic Games – Water Polo

=== Official Reports (FINA) ===
PDF documents on the FINA website:

- HistoFINA – Water polo medalists and statistics (as of September 2019) (archive) (p. 56)
- 1870–2020 | 150 years of Water Polo – Evolution of its rules (archive)

=== Official website (IOC) ===
Water polo on the International Olympic Committee website:

- Water polo
- Women's water polo

=== Olympedia ===
Water polo on the Olympedia website:

- Water polo
- Women's water polo
- Athlete count for water polo
- Water polo venues
- Water polo at the 2000 Summer Olympics (women's tournament)
- Water polo at the 2004 Summer Olympics (women's tournament)
- Water polo at the 2008 Summer Olympics (women's tournament)
- Water polo at the 2012 Summer Olympics (women's tournament)
- Water polo at the 2016 Summer Olympics (women's tournament)
- Water polo at the 2020 Summer Olympics (women's tournament)

=== Sports Reference ===
Water polo on the Sports Reference website:

- Country Medal Leaders & Athlete Medal Leaders (1900–2016) (archived)
- Women's water polo (2000–2016) (archived)
- Water polo at the 2000 Summer Games (women's tournament) (archived)
- Water polo at the 2004 Summer Games (women's tournament) (archived)
- Water polo at the 2008 Summer Games (women's tournament) (archived)
- Water polo at the 2012 Summer Games (women's tournament) (archived)
- Water polo at the 2016 Summer Games (women's tournament) (archived)

=== Todor66 ===
Water polo on the Todor66 website:

- Water polo at the Summer Games
- Water polo at the 2000 Summer Olympics (women's tournament, women's qualification)
- Water polo at the 2004 Summer Olympics (women's tournament, women's qualification)
- Water polo at the 2008 Summer Olympics (women's tournament, women's qualification)
- Water polo at the 2012 Summer Olympics (women's tournament, women's qualification)
- Water polo at the 2016 Summer Olympics (women's tournament, women's qualification)
- Water polo at the 2020 Summer Olympics (women's tournament, women's qualification)

=== ISHOF ===
International Swimming Hall of Fame (ISHOF) website:

- Honorees Listed by Category – Water Polo
- Honorees Listed by Category – Coaches
- Honorees Listed by Category – Contributors
- Honorees by Country
- Honorees By Last Name
