= Australia women's Olympic water polo team records and statistics =

This article lists various water polo records and statistics in relation to the Australia women's national water polo team at the Summer Olympics.

The Australia women's national water polo team has participated in 5 of 5 official women's water polo tournaments.

== Abbreviations ==
Apps	Appearances	Rk	Rank	Ref	Reference	Cap No.	Water polo cap number
Pos	Playing position	FP	Field player	GK	Goalkeeper	ISHOF	International Swimming Hall of Fame
L/R	Handedness	L	Left-handed	R	Right-handed	Oly debut	Olympic debut in water polo
(C)	Captain	p.	page	pp.	pages		

== Team statistics ==
=== Comprehensive results by tournament ===
Note: Results of Olympic qualification tournaments are not included. Last updated: 5 May 2021.

Legend

- 1st – Champions
- 2nd – Runners-up
- 3rd – Third place
- 4th – Fourth place
- Q – Qualified for forthcoming tournament
- – Hosts

Women's team	2000	2004	2008	2012	2016	2020	Years
Australia	1st	4th	3rd	3rd	6th	Q	6
Total teams	6	8	8	8	8	10	

=== Number of appearances ===
Last updated: 5 May 2021.

Legend

- Year^{*} – As host team

Women's team	Apps	Record streak	Active streak	Debut	Most recent	Best finish	Confederation
Australia	5	5	5	2000^{*}	2016	Champions	Oceania – OSA

=== Best finishes ===
Last updated: 5 May 2021.

Legend

- Year^{*} – As host team

Women's team	Best finish	Apps	Confederation
Australia	Champions (2000^{*})	5	Oceania – OSA

=== Finishes in the top four ===
Last updated: 5 May 2021.

Legend

- Year^{*} – As host team

Women's team	Total	Champions	Runners-up	Third place	Fourth place	First	Last
Australia	4	1 (2000^{*})		2 (2008, 2012)	1 (2004)	2000	2012

=== Medal table ===
Last updated: 16 October 2024.

Women's team	Gold	Silver	Bronze	Total
Australia (AUS)	1	1	2	4

== Player statistics ==
=== Multiple appearances ===
The following table is pre-sorted by number of Olympic appearances (in descending order), year of the last Olympic appearance (in ascending order), year of the first Olympic appearance (in ascending order), date of birth (in ascending order), name of the player (in ascending order), respectively.

- Number of four-time Olympians: 0
- Number of three-time Olympians: 4
- Last updated: 26 July 2021.

Legend

- – Hosts

Female athletes who competed in water polo at three or more Olympics
Apps	Player	Birth	Pos	Water polo tournaments					Age of first/last	ISHOF member	Note	Ref
Apps	Player	Birth	Pos	1	2	3	4	5	Age of first/last	ISHOF member	Note	Ref
3	Melissa Rippon	1981	FP	2004	2008	2012			23/31			
3	Kate Gynther	1982	FP	2004	2008	2012			22/30			
3	Bronwen Knox	1986	FP	2008	2012	2016			22/30			
3	Gemma Beadsworth	1987	FP	2008	2012	2016			21/29			

=== Multiple medalists ===
The following table is pre-sorted by total number of Olympic medals (in descending order), number of Olympic gold medals (in descending order), number of Olympic silver medals (in descending order), year of receiving the last Olympic medal (in ascending order), year of receiving the first Olympic medal (in ascending order), name of the player (in ascending order), respectively.

- Number of three-time Olympic medalists: 0
- Number of two-time Olympic medalists: 5
- Last updated: 11 August 2021.

Legend

- – Hosts

Female athletes who won two or more Olympic medals in water polo
Rk	Player	Birth	Height	Pos	Water polo tournaments					Period (age of first/last)	Medals				Ref
Rk	Player	Birth	Height	Pos	1	2	3	4	5	Period (age of first/last)	G	S	B	T	Ref
1	Gemma Beadsworth	1987	1.80 m (5 ft 11 in)	FP	2008	2012	2016			8 years (21/29)	0	0	2	2	
1	Kate Gynther	1982	1.75 m (5 ft 9 in)	FP	2004	2008	2012			8 years (22/30)	0	0	2	2	
1	Bronwen Knox	1986	1.82 m (6 ft 0 in)	FP	2008	2012	2016	2020		13 years (22/35)	0	0	2	2	
1	Alicia McCormack	1983	1.68 m (5 ft 6 in)	GK	2008	2012				4 years (25/29)	0	0	2	2	
1	Melissa Rippon	1981	1.69 m (5 ft 7 in)	FP	2004	2008	2012			8 years (23/31)	0	0	2	2	

=== Top goalscorers ===
The following table is pre-sorted by number of total goals (in descending order), year of the last Olympic appearance (in ascending order), year of the first Olympic appearance (in ascending order), name of the player (in ascending order), respectively.

- Number of goalscorers (40+ goals): 0
- Number of goalscorers (30–39 goals): 1
- Number of goalscorers (20–29 goals): 4
- Last updated: 1 April 2021.

Legend

- – Hosts

Female players with 20 or more goals at the Olympics
Rk	Player	Birth	L/R	Total goals	Water polo tournaments (goals)					Age of first/last	ISHOF member	Note	Ref
Rk	Player	Birth	L/R	Total goals	1	2	3	4	5	Age of first/last	ISHOF member	Note	Ref
1	Kate Gynther	1982	Right	30	2004 (7)	2008 (13)	2012 (10)			22/30			
2	Ashleigh Southern	1992	Right	26	2012 (12)	2016 (14)				19/23			
3	Rowena Webster	1987	Right	23	2012 (12)	2016 (11)				24/28			
4	Gemma Beadsworth	1987	Right	20	2008 (9)	2012 (10)	2016 (1)			21/29			
4	Bronwen Knox	1986	Right	20	2008 (12)	2012 (4)	2016 (4)			22/30			

- Official Results Books (PDF): 2000 (p. 96), 2004 (pp. 56–57), 2008 (pp. 56–57), 2012 (pp. 347–348), 2016 (pp. 197–198).

=== Goalkeepers ===
The following table is pre-sorted by edition of the Olympics (in ascending order), cap number or name of the goalkeeper (in ascending order), respectively.

Last updated: 1 April 2021.

Legend and abbreviation

- – Hosts
- Eff % – Save efficiency (Saves / Shots)

Year	Cap No.	Goalkeeper	Birth	Age	Saves	Shots	Eff %	ISHOF member	Note	Ref
2000 (gold)	1	Liz Weekes	1971	29	21	46	45.7%		Starting goalkeeper	
2000 (gold)	7	Danielle Woodhouse	1969	31	11	15	73.3%			
2004	1	Emma Knox	1978	26	12	26	42.9%			
2004	11	Jemma Brownlow	1979	24	19	31	61.3%			
2008 (bronze)	1	Emma Knox (2)	1978	30	16	42	38.1%			
2008 (bronze)	13	Alicia McCormack	1983	25	32	59	54.2%			
2012 (bronze)	1	Victoria Brown	1985	27	4	8	50.0%			
2012 (bronze)	13	Alicia McCormack (2)	1983	29	40	93	43.0%		Starting goalkeeper	
2016	1	Lea Yanitsas	1989	27	27	46	58.7%			
2016	13	Kelsey Wakefield	1991	25	18	38	47.4%			
Year	Cap No.	Goalkeeper	Birth	Age	Saves	Shots	Eff %	ISHOF member	Note	Ref

- Official Results Books (PDF): 2000 (p. 96), 2004 (pp. 56–57), 2008 (pp. 56–57), 2012 (pp. 347–348), 2016 (pp. 197–198).

=== Top sprinters ===
The following table is pre-sorted by number of total sprints won (in descending order), year of the last Olympic appearance (in ascending order), year of the first Olympic appearance (in ascending order), name of the sprinter (in ascending order), respectively.

* Number of sprinters (30+ sprints won): 1

- Number of sprinters (20–29 sprints won): 0
- Number of sprinters (10–19 sprints won): 1
- Number of sprinters (5–9 sprints won): 2
- Last updated: 15 May 2021.

Legend and abbreviation

- – Hosts
- Eff % – Efficiency (Sprints won / Sprints contested)

Female players with 5 or more sprints won at the Olympics
Rk	Sprinter	Birth	Total sprints won	Total sprints contested	Eff %	Water polo tournaments (sprints won / contested)					Age of first/last	ISHOF member	Note	Ref
Rk	Sprinter	Birth	Total sprints won	Total sprints contested	Eff %	1	2	3	4	5	Age of first/last	ISHOF member	Note	Ref
1	Kate Gynther	1982	39	58	67.2%	2004 (5/8)	2008 (13/26)	2012 (21/24)			22/30			
2	Melissa Mills	1973	14	15	93.3%	2000 (14/15)					26/26			
3	Nicola Zagame	1990	8	10	80.0%	2012 (4/4)	2016 (4/6)				22/25			
4	Bronwyn Mayer	1974	6	11	54.5%	2000 (6/8)	2004 (0/3)				26/30			

- Official Results Books (PDF): 2000 (p. 96), 2004 (pp. 56–57), 2008 (pp. 56–57), 2012 (pp. 347–348), 2016 (pp. 197–198).

== Coach statistics ==
=== Most successful coaches ===
The following table is pre-sorted by total number of Olympic medals (in descending order), number of Olympic gold medals (in descending order), number of Olympic silver medals (in descending order), year of winning the last Olympic medal (in ascending order), year of winning the first Olympic medal (in ascending order), name of the coach (in ascending order), respectively. Last updated: 5 May 2021.

Greg McFadden led Australia women's national team to win two consecutive Olympic bronze medals in 2008 and 2012.

Legend

- – Hosts

Head coaches who led women's national teams to win two or more Olympic medals
Rk	Head coach	Nationality	Birth	Age	Women's team	Tournaments (finish)			Period	Medals				Ref
Rk	Head coach	Nationality	Birth	Age	Women's team	1	2	3	Period	G	S	B	T	Ref
1	Greg McFadden	Australia	1964	43–51	Australia	2008 (3rd)	2012 (3rd)	2016 (6th)	8 years	0	0	2	2	

=== Medals as coach and player ===
The following table is pre-sorted by total number of Olympic medals (in descending order), number of Olympic gold medals (in descending order), number of Olympic silver medals (in descending order), year of winning the last Olympic medal (in ascending order), year of winning the first Olympic medal (in ascending order), name of the person (in ascending order), respectively. Last updated: 5 May 2021.

With the Hungary men's national water polo team, István Görgényi won a silver medal at the 1972 Summer Olympics in Munich. He was appointed head coach of the Australia women's national team in 1998. At the 2000 Sydney Olympics, he led the team to win the inaugural women's water polo gold medal.

Legend

- Year^{*} – As host team

Rk	Person	Birth	Height	Player				Head coach			Total medals				Ref
Rk	Person	Birth	Height	Age	Men's team	Pos	Medal	Age	Women's team	Medal	G	S	B	T	Ref
1	István Görgényi	1946	1.87 m (6 ft 2 in)	25	Hungary	FP	1972 (silver)	53	Australia	2000^{*} (gold)	1	1	0	2	

== Olympic champions ==
=== 2000 Summer Olympics ===
- Edition of women's tournament: 1st
- Host city: Sydney, Australia
- Number of participating teams: 6
- Competition format: Round-robin pools advanced teams to classification matches
- Champion: Australia (1st title; 1st place in preliminary A group)

Match	Round	Date	Cap color	Opponent	Result	Goals for	Goals against	Goals diff.
Match 1/7	Preliminary round – Group A	16 September 2000	Blue	Kazakhstan	Won	9	2	7
Match 2/7	Preliminary round – Group A	17 September 2000	White	Russia	Won	6	3	3
Match 3/7	Preliminary round – Group A	18 September 2000	Blue	Netherlands	Lost	4	5	-1
Match 4/7	Preliminary round – Group A	19 September 2000	Blue	United States	Won	7	6	1
Match 5/7	Preliminary round – Group A	20 September 2000	Blue	Canada	Won	9	4	5
Match 6/7	Semi-finals	22 September 2000	White	Russia	Won	7	6	1
Match 7/7	Gold medal match	23 September 2000	White	United States	Won	4	3	1
Total	Matches played: 7 • Wins: 6 • Ties: 0 • Defeats: 1 • Win %: 85.7%					46	29	17

Source: Official Results Books (PDF): 2000 (pp. 103, 106, 108, 111, 115, 119, 121).

- Head coach: (Hungary) István Görgényi (1st title as head coach)

Roster
Cap No.	Player	Pos	L/R	Height	Weight	Date of birth	Age of winning gold	Oly debut	ISHOF member
1	Liz Weekes	GK	R	1.80 m (5 ft 11 in)	68 kg (150 lb)	22 September 1971	29 years, 1 day	Yes	
2	Yvette Higgins	FP	R	1.73 m (5 ft 8 in)	73 kg (161 lb)	5 January 1978	22 years, 262 days	Yes	
3	Gail Miller	FP	R	1.80 m (5 ft 11 in)	65 kg (143 lb)	30 November 1976	23 years, 298 days	Yes	
4	Naomi Castle	FP	R	1.80 m (5 ft 11 in)	72 kg (159 lb)	29 May 1974	26 years, 117 days	Yes	
5	Bronwyn Mayer	FP	R	1.76 m (5 ft 9 in)	65 kg (143 lb)	3 July 1974	26 years, 82 days	Yes	
6	Simone Hankin	FP	R	1.82 m (6 ft 0 in)	80 kg (176 lb)	28 February 1973	27 years, 208 days	Yes	
7	Danielle Woodhouse	GK	R	1.73 m (5 ft 8 in)	68 kg (150 lb)	23 January 1969	31 years, 244 days	Yes	
8	Kate Hooper	FP	R	1.77 m (5 ft 10 in)	73 kg (161 lb)	26 February 1978	22 years, 210 days	Yes	
9	Debbie Watson	FP	R	1.78 m (5 ft 10 in)	71 kg (157 lb)	28 September 1965	34 years, 361 days	Yes	2008
10	Taryn Woods	FP	R	1.75 m (5 ft 9 in)	76 kg (168 lb)	12 August 1975	25 years, 42 days	Yes	
11	Bridgette Gusterson	FP	R	1.80 m (5 ft 11 in)	74 kg (163 lb)	7 February 1973	27 years, 229 days	Yes	2017
12	Joanne Fox	FP	L	1.82 m (6 ft 0 in)	72 kg (159 lb)	12 June 1979	21 years, 103 days	Yes	
13	Melissa Mills	FP	R	1.80 m (5 ft 11 in)	67 kg (148 lb)	26 December 1973	26 years, 272 days	Yes	
Average				1.78 m (5 ft 10 in)	71 kg (157 lb)	21 February 1974	26 years, 215 days		
Coach	István Görgényi			1.87 m (6 ft 2 in)		2 November 1946	53 years, 326 days		

Note: Bridgette Gusterson and Danielle Woodhouse are sisters; Bronwyn Mayer and Taryn Woods are cousins.
Sources:

- Official Results Books (PDF): 2000 (p. 96);
- Olympedia: 2000 (women's tournament);
- ISHOF.

Abbreviation

- MP – Matches played
- G – Goals
- Sh – Shots
- AS – Assists
- TF – Turnover fouls
- ST – Steals
- BL – Blocked shots
- SP – Sprints
- 20S – 20 seconds exclusion
- Pen – Penalty
- EX – Exclusion

Statistics
Cap No.	Player	Pos	MP	Goals/Shots			AS	TF	ST	BL	Sprints			Personal fouls		
Cap No.	Player	Pos	MP	G	Sh	%	AS	TF	ST	BL	Won	SP	%	20S	Pen	EX
1	Liz Weekes	GK	7						3							
2	Yvette Higgins	FP	7	8	18	44.4%	3	5	2					2		
3	Gail Miller	FP	7	2	4	50.0%		3	9	3	4	5	80.0%	3		
4	Naomi Castle	FP	7	3	22	13.6%	6	2	15	3				8		
5	Bronwyn Mayer	FP	7	6	11	54.5%	3	3	9		6	8	75.0%	3		
6	Simone Hankin	FP	7	4	18	22.2%	3	8	6					7		
7	Danielle Woodhouse	GK	7						1							
8	Kate Hooper	FP	7													
9	Debbie Watson	FP	7	3	10	30.0%	1	2	6	3				4		
10	Taryn Woods	FP	7	3	22	13.6%	1	1	4					10		
11	Bridgette Gusterson	FP	7	11	30	36.7%	6	4	3					3		
12	Joanne Fox	FP	7	2	10	20.0%	2		9	2				9		
13	Melissa Mills	FP	7	4	16	25.0%	5	1	5	1	14	15	93.3%	3		
Total			7	46	161	28.6%	30	29	72	12	24	28	85.7%	52	0	0
Against				29	116	25.0%	12	43	50	10	4	28	14.3%	51	5	0

Cap No.	Player	Pos	Saves/Shots		
Cap No.	Player	Pos	Saves	Shots	%
1	Liz Weekes	GK	21	46	45.7%
7	Danielle Woodhouse	GK	11	15	73.3%
Total			32	61	52.5%

Source: Official Results Books (PDF): 2000 (p. 96).

== See also ==
- Australia men's Olympic water polo team records and statistics
- List of women's Olympic water polo tournament records and statistics
- Lists of Olympic water polo records and statistics
- Australia at the Olympics

== Sources ==
=== Official Results Books (IOC) ===
PDF documents in the LA84 Foundation Digital Library:

- Official Results Book – 2000 Olympic Games – Water Polo (download, archive)
- Official Results Book – 2004 Olympic Games – Water Polo (download, archive)
- Official Results Book – 2008 Olympic Games – Water Polo (download, archive)

PDF documents on the FINA website:

- Official Results Book – 2012 Olympic Games – Diving, Swimming, Synchronised Swimming, Water Polo (archive) (pp. 284–507)

PDF documents in the Olympic World Library:

- Official Results Book – 2016 Olympic Games – Water Polo (archive)

PDF documents on the International Olympic Committee website:

- Official Results Book – 2020 Olympic Games – Water Polo (archive)
- Official Results Book – 2024 Olympic Games – Water Polo

=== Official Reports (FINA) ===
PDF documents on the FINA website:

- HistoFINA – Water polo medalists and statistics (as of September 2019) (archive) (p. 56)
- 1870–2020 | 150 years of Water Polo – Evolution of its rules (archive)

=== Official website (IOC) ===
Water polo on the International Olympic Committee website:

- Water polo
- Women's water polo

=== Olympedia ===
Water polo on the Olympedia website:

- Water polo
- Women's water polo
- Athlete count for water polo
- Water polo venues
- Water polo at the 2000 Summer Olympics (women's tournament)
- Water polo at the 2004 Summer Olympics (women's tournament)
- Water polo at the 2008 Summer Olympics (women's tournament)
- Water polo at the 2012 Summer Olympics (women's tournament)
- Water polo at the 2016 Summer Olympics (women's tournament)
- Water polo at the 2020 Summer Olympics (women's tournament)

=== Sports Reference ===
Water polo on the Sports Reference website:

- Country Medal Leaders & Athlete Medal Leaders (1900–2016) (archived)
- Women's water polo (2000–2016) (archived)
- Water polo at the 2000 Summer Games (women's tournament) (archived)
- Water polo at the 2004 Summer Games (women's tournament) (archived)
- Water polo at the 2008 Summer Games (women's tournament) (archived)
- Water polo at the 2012 Summer Games (women's tournament) (archived)
- Water polo at the 2016 Summer Games (women's tournament) (archived)

=== Todor66 ===
Water polo on the Todor66 website:

- Water polo at the Summer Games
- Water polo at the 2000 Summer Olympics (women's tournament, women's qualification)
- Water polo at the 2004 Summer Olympics (women's tournament, women's qualification)
- Water polo at the 2008 Summer Olympics (women's tournament, women's qualification)
- Water polo at the 2012 Summer Olympics (women's tournament, women's qualification)
- Water polo at the 2016 Summer Olympics (women's tournament, women's qualification)
- Water polo at the 2020 Summer Olympics (women's tournament, women's qualification)

=== ISHOF ===
International Swimming Hall of Fame (ISHOF) website:

- Honorees Listed by Category – Water Polo
- Honorees Listed by Category – Coaches
- Honorees Listed by Category – Contributors
- Honorees by Country
- Honorees By Last Name
