= Gavin Woods (water polo) =

Australian water polo player

Personal information
- Born: 1 March 1978 (age 48) Sydney, Australia

Sport
- Sport: Water polo
Medal record
Representing Australia
Summer Universiade
Bronze medal – third place	2003 Daegu	Team competition

Gavin Woods (born 1 March 1978) is an Australian water polo player. He was a member of Australia's Olympic squad at the 2000, 2004, 2008 and 2012 Summer Olympics. He began his career playing centre-back but switched to centre-forward for the 2004 Olympics.

His father David is a three-time Olympian (1964, 1968 and 1972) and former coach of the Australian women's team (1991–1994), while his sister Taryn and his cousin Bronwyn Mayer were in the women's national team at the Sydney Olympics.

In 2019, he was inducted into the Water Polo Australia Hall of Fame.

== See also ==
- Australia men's Olympic water polo team records and statistics
- List of players who have appeared in multiple men's Olympic water polo tournaments
