= Gail Miller =

Gail Miller may refer to:

- Gail Miller (murder victim) (1948–1969), Canadian nursing student
- Gail Miller (water polo) (born 1976), Australian water polo player
- Gail Miller (businesswoman), American businesswoman and philanthropist, widow of Larry H. Miller
