= Görgényi =

Görgényi is a surname. Notable people with the surname include:

- István Görgényi (born 1946), Hungarian water polo player
