= Water polo at the 2000 Summer Olympics =

Water polo at the Games of the XXVII Olympiad

Tournament details
- Host country: Australia
- City: Sydney
- Venue(s): Ryde Aquatic Leisure Centre, Sydney International Aquatic Centre
- Dates: 16 September – 1 October 2000
- Events: 2 (men's, women's)
- Teams: 12 (men's), 6 (women's) (from 4 confederations)
- Competitors: 153 men, 78 women

Final positions
- Champions: Hungary (men); Australia (women)
- Runners-up: Russia (men); United States (women)
- Third place: Yugoslavia (men); Russia (women)
- Fourth place: Spain (men); Netherlands (women)

Tournament statistics (men, women)
- Matches: 68
- Multiple appearances: 6-time Olympian(s): 1; 5-time Olympian(s): 2; 4-time Olympian(s): 4

The water polo competition at the 2000 Summer Olympics in Sydney, Australia saw Hungary’s return to the gold medal platform and the introduction of the women’s tournament. The Australian women had lobbied the IOC hard for the inclusion of women’s water polo in the Olympics, including showing up at the airport dressed only in their swimsuits during one pre-Olympic visit by members of the IOC.

Six nations competed in the women’s tournament with home team Australia winning the gold medal over the United States. Twelve nations competed in the men’s tournament and played a total of 48 matches. Spain was unable to follow up their 1996 gold medal performance with a medal. Hungary defeated Russia for the gold medal. The matches were held at Ryde Aquatic Leisure Centre and the Sydney Olympic Aquatic Centre.

== Qualification ==
=== Men ===
Events	Dates	Hosts	Quotas	Qualified Teams
Host country	24 September 1993	(Monaco) Monte Carlo	1	Australia
1999 World Cup	28 September - 3 October 1999	(Australia) Sydney	3	Hungary
1999 World Cup	28 September - 3 October 1999	(Australia) Sydney	3	Italy
1999 World Cup	28 September - 3 October 1999	(Australia) Sydney	3	Spain
1999 Pan American Games	23-30 July 1999	(Canada) Winnipeg	1	United States
1999 European Championship	2-11 September 1999	(Italy) Firenze	1	Croatia
2000 Asian Championship	28 March - 2 April 2000	(South Korea) Busan	1	Kazakhstan
Men's Olympic Water Polo Qualifying Tournament	6-14 May 2000	(Germany) Hannover	5	Yugoslavia
Men's Olympic Water Polo Qualifying Tournament	6-14 May 2000	(Germany) Hannover	5	Russia
Men's Olympic Water Polo Qualifying Tournament	6-14 May 2000	(Germany) Hannover	5	Greece
Men's Olympic Water Polo Qualifying Tournament	6-14 May 2000	(Germany) Hannover	5	Slovakia
Men's Olympic Water Polo Qualifying Tournament	6-14 May 2000	(Germany) Hannover	5	Netherlands
Total			12	

=== Women ===
Events		Dates	Hosts	Quotas	Qualified Teams
Host country		24 September 1993	(Monaco) Monte Carlo	1	Australia
1999 World Cup	Europe	24-29 May 1999	(Canada) Winnipeg	1	Netherlands
1999 World Cup	Americas	24-29 May 1999	(Canada) Winnipeg	1	Canada
Women's Olympic Water Polo Qualifying Tournament	World	22-30 April 2000	(Italy) Palermo	2	Russia
Women's Olympic Water Polo Qualifying Tournament	World	22-30 April 2000	(Italy) Palermo	2	United States
Women's Olympic Water Polo Qualifying Tournament	Asia/Africa/Oceania	22-30 April 2000	(Italy) Palermo	1	Kazakhstan
Total				6	

== Medal summary ==
=== Medal table ===
* Host nation (Australia)

Rank	Nation	Gold	Silver	Bronze	Total
1	Australia*	1	0	0	1
1	Hungary	1	0	0	1
3	Russia	0	1	1	2
4	United States	0	1	0	1
5	FR Yugoslavia	0	0	1	1
Totals (5 entries)		2	2	2	6

=== Medalists ===
Event	Gold	Silver	Bronze
Men	Hungary; Attila Vári; Zoltán Szécsi; Bulcsú Székely; Zsolt Varga; Tamás Märcz; Tamás Molnár; Barnabás Steinmetz; Tamás Kásás; Gergely Kiss; Zoltán Kósz; Tibor Benedek; Péter Biros; Rajmund Fodor	Russia; Irek Zinnourov; Dmitri Stratan; Revaz Chomakhidze; Marat Zakirov; Nikolay Kozlov; Nikolai Maximov; Andrei Rekechinski; Sergey Garbuzov; Dmitry Gorshkov; Yuri Yatsev; Roman Balashov; Dmitri Dugin; Aleksandr Yeryshov	FR Yugoslavia; Predrag Zimonjić; Jugoslav Vasović; Vladimir Vujasinović; Nenad Vukanić; Aleksandar Šoštar; Petar Trbojević; Veljko Uskoković; Nikola Kuljača; Aleksandar Šapić; Dejan Savić; Aleksandar Ćirić; Danilo Ikodinović; Viktor Jelenić
Women	Australia; Taryn Woods; Debbie Watson; Liz Weekes; Danielle Woodhouse; Bronwyn Mayer; Gail Miller; Melissa Mills; Simone Hankin; Yvette Higgins; Kate Hooper; Naomi Castle; Joanne Fox; Bridgette Gusterson	United States; Brenda Villa; Kathy Sheehy; Coralie Simmons; Julie Swail; Courtney Johnson; Maureen O'Toole; Nicolle Payne; Heather Petri; Ericka Lorenz; Heather Moody; Bernice Orwig; Robin Beauregard; Ellen Estes	Russia; Ekaterina Vassilieva; Elena Smurova; Elena Tokoun; Irina Tolkounova; Ioulia Petrova; Tatiana Petrova; Galina Rytova; Maria Koroleva; Natalia Koutouzova; Svetlana Kouzina; Marina Akobia; Ekaterina Anikeeva; Sofia Konoukh

== Sources ==
- PDF documents in the LA84 Foundation Digital Library:
  - Official Results Book – 2000 Olympic Games – Water Polo (download, archive)
- Water polo on the Olympedia website
  - Water polo at the 2000 Summer Olympics (men's tournament, women's tournament)
- Water polo on the Sports Reference website
  - Water polo at the 2000 Summer Games (men's tournament, women's tournament) (archived)
