= Bronwyn Mayer =

Australian water polo player

Personal information
- Born: 3 July 1974 (age 51) Sydney, New South Wales, Australia
Medal record
Women's water polo
Representing Australia
Olympic Games
Gold medal – first place	2000 Sydney	Team competition
World Championships
Bronze medal – third place	1998 Perth	Team competition
FINA World Cup
Gold medal – first place	1995 Sydney	Team competition

Bronwyn Lee Mayer-Smith OAM (born 3 July 1974) is a former Australian water polo player from the gold medal squad of the 2000 Summer Olympics. She also competed on the team in the 2004 Summer Olympics, which took 4th place.

In 2019, she was inducted into the Water Polo Australia Hall of Fame.

== Club water polo ==
Mayer played for the Balmain Water Polo Club.

== Personal life ==
Mayer married Damian Smith in January 2001. She is a cousin of water polo players Gavin and Taryn Woods.

== See also ==
- Australia women's Olympic water polo team records and statistics
- List of Olympic champions in women's water polo
- List of Olympic medalists in water polo (women)
- List of World Aquatics Championships medalists in water polo
