= Water polo at the 2000 Summer Olympics – Women's qualification =

The 2000 Women's Olympic Water Polo Qualifying Tournament was a tournament in which three places were available for teams to qualify for the first Olympic women's polo competition.

== Teams ==
GROUP A

- Germany
- Greece
- Italy

GROUP B

- Czech Republic
- Kazakhstan
- United States

GROUP C

- France
- Hungary
- Spain

GROUP D

- Brazil
- Great Britain
- Japan
- Russia

== Preliminary round ==
=== GROUP A ===
	Team	Points	G	W	D	L	GF	GA	Diff
1.	Italy	4	2	2	0	0	18	8	+8
2.	Greece	2	2	1	0	1	12	12	0
3.	Germany	0	2	0	0	2	11	21	–10

- April 22, 2000

Italy	5 – 4	Greece

- April 23, 2000

Italy	13 – 4	Germany

- April 24, 2000

Greece	8 – 7	Germany

=== GROUP B ===
	Team	Points	G	W	D	L	GF	GA	Diff
1.	United States	4	2	2	0	0	21	7	+14
2.	Kazakhstan	2	2	1	0	1	19	13	+6
3.	Czech Republic	0	2	0	0	2	7	27	–20

- April 22, 2000

United States	9 – 4	Kazakhstan

- April 23, 2000

Kazakhstan	15 – 4	Czech Republic

- April 24, 2000

United States	12 – 3	Czech Republic

=== GROUP C ===
	Team	Points	G	W	D	L	GF	GA	Diff
1.	Hungary	4	2	2	0	0	25	7	+18
2.	Spain	2	2	1	0	1	17	17	0
3.	France	0	2	0	0	2	9	27	–18

- April 22, 2000

Spain	12 – 7	France

- April 23, 2000

France	2 – 15	Hungary

- April 24, 2000

Spain	5 – 10	Hungary

=== GROUP D ===
	Team	Points	G	W	D	L	GF	GA	Diff
1.	Russia	6	3	3	0	0	45	11	+34
2.	Brazil	4	3	2	0	1	23	21	+2
3.	Japan	2	3	1	0	2	23	29	–6
4.	Great Britain	0	3	0	0	3	12	42	–30

- Only Great Britain did not contest the semifinal and final rounds, having finished fourth in its group.
- April 22, 2000

Japan	12 – 6	Great Britain
Russia	12 – 3	Brazil

- April 23, 2000

Japan	6 – 7	Brazil
Great Britain	3 – 17	Russia

- April 24, 2000

Great Britain	3 – 13	Brazil
Japan	5 – 16	Russia

== Second round ==
=== GROUP E ===
	Team	Points	G	W	D	L	GF	GA	Diff
1.	Italy	10	5	5	0	0	62	22	+40
2.	United States	8	5	4	0	1	49	24	+25
3.	Kazakhstan	6	5	3	0	2	38	38	0
4.	Greece	4	5	2	0	3	36	37	+9
5.	Germany	2	5	1	0	4	35	46	–11
6.	Czech Republic	0	5	0	0	5	14	77	–63

- April 26, 2000

Italy	18 – 2	Czech Republic
Germany	6 – 14	United States
Greece	4 – 7	Kazakhstan

- April 27, 2000

Greece	1 – 6	United States
Germany	13 – 3	Czech Republic
Italy	16 – 4	Kazakhstan

- April 28, 2000

Germany	5 – 8	Kazakhstan
Greece	19 – 2	Czech Republic
Italy	10 – 8	United States

=== GROUP F ===
	Team	Points	G	W	D	L	GF	GA	Diff
1.	Hungary	10	5	5	0	0	68	25	+43
2.	Russia	8	5	4	0	1	84	26	+58
3.	Brazil	5	5	2	1	2	39	42	–3
4.	Japan	3	5	1	1	3	41	57	–16
5.	Spain	2	5	1	0	4	27	36	–9
6.	France	1	5	0	1	4	20	63	–43

- April 26, 2000

Hungary	18 – 5	Japan
France	1 – 21	Russia
Spain	3 – 4	Brazil

- April 27, 2000

Spain	4 – 9	Russia
France	7 – 7	Japan
Hungary	15 – 4	Brazil

- April 28, 2000

France	3 – 8	Brazil
Spain	3 – 6	Japan
Hungary	10 – 9	Russia

== Play-Offs ==
- April 29, 2000 — 9th/12th place

Spain	13 – 5	Czech Republic
Germany	12 – 3	France

- April 29, 2000 — 5th/8th place

Greece	9 – 4	Brazil
Kazakhstan	9 – 4	Japan

- April 29, 2000 — 1st/4th place

United States	6 – 5	Hungary
Russia	8 – 7	Italy

== Finals ==
- April 30, 2000 — Eleventh place

France	10 – 5	Czech Republic

- April 30, 2000 — Ninth place

Spain	10 – 9	Germany

- April 30, 2000 — Seventh place

Japan	4 – 2	Brazil

- April 30, 2000 — Fifth place

Greece	10 – 8	Kazakhstan

- April 30, 2000 — Third place

Hungary	8 – 4	Italy

- April 30, 2000 — First place

Russia	9 – 6	United States

== Final ranking ==
RANK	TEAM
1.	Russia
2.	United States
3.	Hungary
4.	Italy
5.	Greece
6.	Kazakhstan
7.	Japan
8.	Brazil
9.	Spain
10.	Germany
11.	France
12.	Czech Republic

- Russia, United States and Kazakhstan qualified for the 2000 Summer Olympics in Sydney, Australia

== Individual awards ==
- Most Valuable Player
  - Yuliya Petrova (RUS)
- Best Goalkeeper
  - Francesca Conti (ITA)
- Best Scorer
  - Mercedes Stieber (HUN)

== See also ==
- 2000 Men's Water Polo Olympic Qualifier
