= Bridgette Gusterson =

Australian water polo player

Bridgette Gusterson OAM
Personal information
- Born: 7 February 1973 Perth, Western Australia, Australia
Medal record
Women's water polo
Representing Australia
Olympic Games
Gold medal – first place	2000 Sydney	Team competition
World Championships
Bronze medal – third place	1998 Perth	Team competition
FINA World Cup
Gold medal – first place	1995 Sydney	Team competition

Bridgette Marie Gusterson OAM (born 7 February 1973), also known as Bridgette Ireland, is an Australian water polo player, at the 1995 FINA World Cup, and from the gold medal team of the 2000 Summer Olympics. She was a captain of the team from 1997 to 2000. She is the sister of fellow Australian water polo player and Olympic teammate Danielle Woodhouse.

== Recognition ==
- 2002 – Inducted into Australian Institute of Sport's "Best of the Best"
- 2010 – Inducted into the Water Polo Australia Hall of Fame
- 2020 – Inducted into Sport Australia Hall of Fame

== See also ==
- Australia women's Olympic water polo team records and statistics
- List of Olympic champions in women's water polo
- List of Olympic medalists in water polo (women)
- List of World Aquatics Championships medalists in water polo
- List of members of the International Swimming Hall of Fame
