= Debbie Watson (water polo) =

Australian water polo player and coach

Debbie Watson OAM
Personal information
- Full name: Deborah Kathleen "Debbie" Watson
- Nationality: Australia
- Born: 28 September 1965 (age 61) Sydney, New South Wales, Australia
- Height: 1.78 m (5 ft 10 in)
- Weight: 71 kg (157 lb)

Sport
- Sport: Water polo
- Handedness: Right
- Position: Field player
- College team: University of Sydney
National team
- Years: Team
- 1983–2000: Australia
Medal record
Women's Water Polo
Representing Australia
Olympic Games
Gold medal – first place	2000 Sydney	Team
World Championship
Gold medal – first place	1986 Madrid	Team
FINA World Cup
Gold medal – first place	1984 Irvine	Team
Gold medal – first place	1995 Sydney	Team
Silver medal – second place	1991 Long Beach	Team
Bronze medal – third place	1983 Sainte-Foy	Team

Deborah Kathleen Watson OAM (born 28 September 1965) is an Australian former water polo player. She has been regarded as one of the greatest female water polo players to ever play the game. She won gold medals at the 2000 Summer Olympics in Sydney and the 1986 World Aquatics Championships in Madrid.

== Early life ==
Watson was born in Sydney. She played netball before water polo. After doctors advised her to give up land sports for injuries, she joined her school's water polo team.

== Career ==
In 1983, Debbie Watson was selected to represent Australia for her great talent in water polo. Her first international appearance was as a 17-year-old at the 1983 FINA Women's Water Polo World Cup in Sainte-Foy, Quebec, Canada, where the Australian team finished in third place.

With the national squad Watson won gold medal at the 1984 FINA Women's Water Polo World Cup in Irvine, California, United States. At 20 years old, Watson was part of the team that won gold at the 1986 World Aquatics Championships in Madrid, Spain.

She went on to captain Australia from 1991 to 1996, and was voted best player in the world in 1993. She won the FINA World Cup again in 1995 after finishing in second place at Long Beach, California in 1991.

Watson retired in 1996 at age of 30. But in 1997, when the International Olympic Committee added women's water polo to the Olympic program in 2000, She jumped back into the pool. By defeating the United States 4-3 in the final, home team Australia won the first gold medal in women's water polo at the Sydney Summer Olympics, making Watson the first female athlete to win gold in water polo both at the Olympics and at the World Championship. As of 2020, Watson is the second oldest Olympic champion in women's water polo (34 years, 361 days).

In 2006, she became the first female water polo player to make it into the Australian Sports Hall of Fame. In 2008, she became the first female water polo player to be inducted into the International Swimming Hall of Fame. In 2009, she was inducted into the Water Polo Australia Hall of Fame.

== Other event ==
Watson competed in the Gladiator Individual Sports Athletes Challenge in 1995.

== Honours ==
=== Olympic Games ===
- Gold (1): 2000

=== World Championship ===
- Gold (1): 1986

=== Water Polo World Cup ===
- Gold (2): 1984, 1995
- Silver (1): 1991
- Bronze (1): 1983

=== Hall of Fame ===
- Australian Sports Hall of Fame: 2006
- International Swimming Hall of Fame: 2008
- Water Polo Australia Hall of Fame: 2009

== See also ==
- Australia women's Olympic water polo team records and statistics
- List of Olympic champions in women's water polo
- List of Olympic medalists in water polo (women)
- List of world champions in women's water polo
- List of World Aquatics Championships medalists in water polo
- List of members of the International Swimming Hall of Fame
