= István Görgényi =

Hungarian water polo player

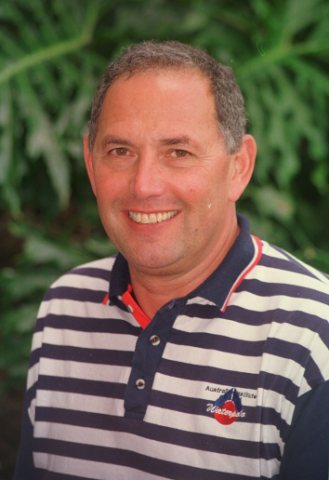

Personal information
- Born: November 2, 1946 (age 79) Budapest, Hungary

Sport
- Sport: Water polo
Medal record
Representing Hungary
Olympic Games
| Silver medal – second place | 1972 Munich | Team competition |
World Championships
| Gold medal – first place | 1973 Belgrade | Team competition |
| Silver medal – second place | 1975 Cali | Team competition |
European Championships
| Gold medal – first place | 1974 Vienna | Team competition |
| Silver medal – second place | 1970 Barcelona | Team competition |

István Görgényi (born 2 November 1946) is a Hungarian former water polo player who won a silver medal at the 1972 Summer Olympics and coached the Australian women's national water polo team to the gold medal at the 2000 Sydney Olympics.

== Playing career ==
Gorgenyi represented Hungary as a player 96 times and was a member of teams that won the silver medal at 1972 Munich Olympics, won the gold medal at the 1973 World Championships, the silver medal at the 1975 World Championships and won the gold medal at the 1974 European Water Polo Championship. He retired at 36 and took up coaching 18 months later.

== Coaching career ==
From 1984 to 1990, he was Head Coach of Ujpest TE Sporting Club in the Hungarian National League from 1984 to 1990. Results during this period were: first in 1986, second in 1989 and third in 1987 and semi-finalist in 1986 European Cup of Champions. From 1991 to 1994, he was Head Coach of CACEL Nice Water Polo Club in the French National League in 1991. Results during this period were: first in 1992, 1993, 1994 and second in 1991.

Gorgenyi was appointed head coach of its Victorian Intensive Training Centre in 1994 and national development coach in 1996. He became national junior coach in 1997. On 1 June 1998, Gorgenyi, was appointed Australian women's national water polo team Head Coach and the inaugural Australian Institute of Sport women's water polo program Head Coach. Gorgenyi coached the Australian team to win the inaugural women's water polo gold medal at the 2000 Sydney Olympics. Gorgenyi retired in December 2004 and was replaced by Greg McFadden as National Head Coach and AIS Head Coach in January 2005. In 2019, he was inducted into the Water Polo Australia Hall of Fame.

Major results of the Australian team during his period as Head Coach of the Australian team:

=== Olympic Games ===
- 2000 — 1st place
- 2004 — 4th place

=== FINA World Championship ===
- 2001 — 5th place
- 2003 — 7th place

=== FINA World Cup ===
- 1999 — 2nd place
- 2002 — 6th place

In 2005, Gorgenyi set up a consultancy to promote his 'Hunting Territory ' philosophy - "a form of behaviour by which a player or more commonly a small group of players form ownerships of parts of the team process, often subconsciously, and, disdaining the broad collective interest, ultimately cause it to break down."

== See also ==
- Hungary men's Olympic water polo team records and statistics
- Australia women's Olympic water polo team records and statistics
- List of Olympic champions in women's water polo
- List of Olympic medalists in water polo (men)
- List of world champions in men's water polo
- List of World Aquatics Championships medalists in water polo
