= Olga Leshchuk =

Russian-born Kazakhstani water polo player

Personal information
- Nationality: Soviet; Russian; Kazakhstani
- Born: 3 January 1971 (age 54); Chelyabinsk, Russian SFSR, Soviet Union
- Height: 1.74 m (5 ft 9 in)
- Weight: 69 kg (152 lb)

Sport
- Sport: Water polo

Olga Leshchuk (born 3 January 1971) is a Russian-born Kazakhstani water polo player. She competed in the women's tournament at the 2000 Summer Olympics.
