= Danielle Woodhouse =

Australian water polo player

Personal information
- Born: 23 January 1969 (age 57) Perth, Western Australia

Sport
- Sport: Water polo
Medal record
Representing Australia
Olympic Games
Gold medal – first place	2000 Sydney	Team competition
World Championships
Bronze medal – third place	1998 Perth	Team competition
FINA World Cup
Gold medal – first place	1995 Sydney	Team competition

Danielle Woodhouse OAM (born 23 January 1969) is an Australian former water polo player from the gold medal squad of the 2000 Summer Olympics. She is the sister of Bridgette Ireland (Gusterson) who was captain of the 2000 Olympic Team. Along with Liz Weekes, Woodhouse was the goal keeper for the Australian team in 2000. Danielle is a Sports Physiotherapist working with elite water polo players residing in Perth with her husband and 2 children.

== See also ==
- Australia women's Olympic water polo team records and statistics
- List of Olympic champions in women's water polo
- List of Olympic medalists in water polo (women)
- List of women's Olympic water polo tournament goalkeepers
- List of World Aquatics Championships medalists in water polo
