= Irina Tolkunova =

Russian water polo player

Personal information
- Born: 2 June 1971 (age 55) Moscow, Soviet Union
Medal record
Women's water polo
Representing Russia
Olympic Games
Bronze medal – third place	2000 Sydney	Team competition
European Championship
Bronze medal – third place	1999 Prato	Team competition
Bronze medal – third place	2001 Budapest	Team competition

Irina Ivanovna Tolkunova (Russian: Ирина Ивановна Толкунова, born 2 June 1971) is a Russian-Kazakhstani water polo player who competed in the 2000 Summer Olympics for Russia and in the 2004 Summer Olympics for Kazakhstan.

In 2000, she won the bronze medal with the Russian team.

Four years later she was part of the Kazakhstani team which was eliminated in the first round.

== See also ==
- List of Olympic medalists in water polo (women)
