= Naomi Castle =

Australian water polo player

Personal information
- Born: 29 May 1974 (age 52) Sydney, Australia

Sport
- Sport: Water polo
Medal record
Representing Australia
Olympic Games
Gold medal – first place	2000 Sydney	Team competition
World Championships
Bronze medal – third place	1998 Perth	Team competition
FINA World Cup
Gold medal – first place	1995 Sydney	Team competition

Naomi Sandra Castle OAM (born 29 May 1974) is an Australian former water polo player from the gold medal squad of the 2000 Summer Olympics. Castle was the captain of the Australian team at the 2004 Summer Olympics where they placed 4th.

In 2009, Castle was inducted into the Queensland Sport Hall of Fame. In 2014, she was inducted into the Water Polo Australia Hall of Fame.

Castle competed in the Gladiator Individual Sports Athletes Challenge in 1995.

== See also ==
- Australia women's Olympic water polo team records and statistics
- List of Olympic champions in women's water polo
- List of Olympic medalists in water polo (women)
- List of World Aquatics Championships medalists in water polo
