= Simone Hankin =

Australian water polo player

Personal information
- Born: February 28, 1973 (age 53) Sydney, Australia

Sport
- Sport: Water polo
Medal record
Representing Australia
Olympic Games
Gold medal – first place	2000 Sydney	Team competition

Simone Lorraine Hankin OAM (born 28 February 1973) is an Australian water polo player from the gold medal squad of the 2000 Summer Olympics.

== See also ==
- Australia women's Olympic water polo team records and statistics
- List of Olympic champions in women's water polo
- List of Olympic medalists in water polo (women)
