= Yuliya Petrova =

Russian water polo player

Personal information
- Born: 24 May 1979 (age 47) Chelyabinsk, Russia
- Height: 5 ft 7 in (1.70 m)
- Weight: 132 lb (60 kg)
Medal record
Women's water polo
Representing Russia
Olympic Games
Bronze medal – third place	2000 Sydney	Team competition
European Championship
Bronze medal – third place	1999 Prato	Team competition

Yuliya Sergeevna Petrova (Russian: Julia S. Petrov, born 24 May 1979) is a Russian water polo player, who won the bronze medal at the 2000 Summer Olympics. She was named Most Valuable Player at the 2000 Women's Water Polo Olympic Qualifier in Palermo, Italy, where the Women's National Team qualified for the Sydney Olympics.

== See also ==
- List of Olympic medalists in water polo (women)
