= Taryn Woods =

Australian water polo player

Personal information
- Born: 12 August 1975 (age 50) Sydney, New South Wales, Australia
Medal record
Women's water polo
Representing Australia
Olympic Games
Gold medal – first place	2000 Sydney	Team competition
World Championships
Bronze medal – third place	1998 Perth	Team competition
FINA World Cup
Gold medal – first place	1995 Sydney	Team competition

Taryn Nadine Woods OAM (born 12 August 1975) is an Australian former water polo player from the gold medal squad of the 2000 Summer Olympics.

Woods attended Fort Street High School. She is the daughter of two-time water polo Olympian David Woods and the sister of water polo international Gavin Woods.

== Club water polo ==
Woods currently plays for the Balmain Water Polo Club.

== See also ==
- Australia women's Olympic water polo team records and statistics
- List of Olympic champions in women's water polo
- List of Olympic medalists in water polo (women)
- List of World Aquatics Championships medalists in water polo
