= Kathy Sheehy =

American water polo player (born 1970)

Personal information
- Born: April 26, 1970 (age 56) Moraga, California, United States
- Occupation: Water polo coach
- Height: 177 cm (5 ft 10 in)
- Weight: 68 kg (150 lb)

Sport
- Sport: Swimming, Water polo
- Position: 2-meter (Center) (WP)
- College team: Cuesta College; San Diego State
- Club: Old Mission Beach Aquatic Club; New York Athletic Club
- Coached by: Jamie Stewart, (Cuesta, SDSU); Guy Baker (Olympics)
Medal record
Representing the United States
Olympic Games
Silver medal – second place	2000 Sydney	Team competition

Kathy Sheehy (born April 26, 1970), nicknamed "Gubba", is an American water polo player, who competed for Cuesta College and San Diego State and won the silver medal at the 2000 Summer Olympics in Sydney, the inaugural Olympic event for women's water polo. Since retiring as an elite competitor in 2000, she has served as a water polo coach for both high school and college teams, and was inducted into the USA Water Polo Hall of Fame in 2010.

Sheehy was born April 26, 1970 in Moraga, California, to father Stephen, a CPA for Wells Fargo. She attended Morago's Campolindo High School where she earned All-American honors on the swimming team and also competed in soccer, softball, and volleyball. Campolindo High had no girls water polo team, so her participation in the sport was delayed until college.

== Collegiate years ==
Kathy attended and both swam and played water polo for Cuesta College in San Luis Obispo from 1989-90 where she competed and trained with Coach Terry Bowen, placing first in the 50 breaststroke with a time of 35.37 and the 100 breaststroke with a time of 1:17.4 in a 1989 meet against Santa Monica College. Competing in swimming for Cuesta College in April, 1989, she swam on a winning 200 freestyle relay team that recorded a time of 1:49.6. She transferred to San Diego State University where she graduated in 1999 and competed in water polo, practicing with the men's team, as there was no women's team at the time. At San Diego State, she was coached by Jamie Stewart, who she first met at the age of 19 when she was involved with aquatics and water polo at Cuesta College. Stewart also coached San Diego Shores, an aquatics club.

Sheehy began competing with the U.S. National team in 1992.

A strong scorer, Sheehy was credited with four goals in the six games of the 2000 water polo Olympic qualification tournament. In elite competition, she usually played the 2-meter position, or center, lining up 2 meters from the center of the goal, and was a highly physical, strong, right-handed player.

== 2000 Sydney Olympic Silver ==
Sheehy won the silver medal at the 2000 Sydney Olympics in the Olympic Women's water polo team competition, during the first year women were allowed to compete in the event. The 2000 Sydney women's Olympic team were managed and trained by Head Coach Guy Baker. At the 2000 Olympic semi-final game, the Australian and U.S. teams defeated the teams from Russia and the Netherlands, 7-6 and 6-5, respectively. In the deciding final match for the gold and silver medals, the U.S. team led 2-1 at halftime. With only seconds remaining in the game, America tied the final game 3-3, but with just over a second remaining in regulation play, only 1.3 seconds remaining Australia scored the deciding goal, giving them the gold medal, by a score of 4-3. The U.S. team took the silver, and the Russian team took the bronze.

=== Coaching ===
In 2008, Sheehy coached the U.S. Senior B national water polo team. In 2000 she was an Assistant water polo coach at Palomar College. She has coached girl's water polo for Poway High School from 2006-8 leading them to Section titles in San Diego, and has coached at La Costa Canyon High School in Carlsbad, California near San Dieguito. She has served as a director of water polo for the Solana Beach Boys and Girls Club in San Dieguito. In 2022, she served as a volunteer Assistant Coach at Arizona State University.

== See also ==
- List of Olympic medalists in water polo (women)
