= Maria Koroleva =

Russian water polo player

Personal information
- Born: October 16, 1974 (age 51) Chelyabinsk, Soviet Union

Sport
- Sport: Water polo
Medal record
Representing Russia
Olympic Games
Bronze medal – third place	2000 Sydney	Team competition
European Championship
Bronze medal – third place	1999 Prato	Team competition

Maria Viktorovna Koroleva (Russian: Мария Викторовна Королева, born October 16, 1974) is a Russian water polo player, who was part of the Bronze Medal winning team at the 2000 Summer Olympics in Sydney, Australia.

== See also ==
- List of Olympic medalists in water polo (women)
