= Elena Tokun =

Russian water polo player

Personal information
- Born: 15 March 1974 (age 52) Moscow, Soviet Union

Sport
- Sport: Water polo
Medal record
Representing Russia
Olympic Games
Bronze medal – third place	2000 Sydney	Team competition
European Championship
Bronze medal – third place	1999 Prato	Team competition

Elena Vasilyevna Tokun (Russian: Елена Васильевна Токун, born 15 March 1974) is a Russian water polo player who won the bronze medal at the 2000 Summer Olympics.

== See also ==
- List of Olympic medalists in water polo (women)
