= Ekaterina Anikeeva =

Russian water polo player (born 1969)

Personal information
- Born: January 22, 1969 (age 57) Moscow, Soviet Union

Sport
- Sport: Water polo
Medal record
Representing Russia
Olympic Games
Bronze medal – third place	2000 Sydney	Team competition
European Championships
Silver medal – second place	1997 Seville	Team competition

Ekaterina Yevgenyevna Anikeeva (Russian: Екатерина Евгеньевна Аникеева, born January 22, 1969) is a Russian water polo player, who won the bronze medal at the 2000 Summer Olympics.

== See also ==
- List of Olympic medalists in water polo (women)
