= Yvette Higgins =

Australian water polo player

Personal information
- Born: 5 January 1978 (age 48) Sydney, Australia

Sport
- Sport: Water polo
Medal record
Representing Australia
Olympic Games
| Gold medal – first place | 2000 Sydney | Team competition |
World Championships
| Bronze medal – third place | 1998 Perth | Team competition |
FINA World Cup
| Gold medal – first place | 1995 Sydney | Team competition |

Yvette Donna Higgins OAM (born 5 January 1978) is an Australian water polo player from the gold medal squad of the 2000 Summer Olympics. Higgins scored the winning goal during the gold medal game with 1.3 seconds left on the clock.

She played in Italy from 2000 to 2002, before retiring from competition. Since 2002, she has been the coach of the Sydney Uni Water Polo Club first grade women's team.

== See also ==
- Australia women's Olympic water polo team records and statistics
- List of Olympic champions in women's water polo
- List of Olympic medalists in water polo (women)
- List of World Aquatics Championships medalists in water polo
