= David Woods (water polo) =

Australian water polo player

Personal information
- Nationality: Australian
- Born: 23 January 1944 (age 81)
- Died: 1 June 2017 (aged 73); Balmain, New South Wales

Sport
- Sport: Water polo

David Woods (23 January 1944 – 1 June 2017) was an Australian water polo player. He competed at the 1972 Summer Olympics and the 1976 Summer Olympics. In 2010, he was inducted into the Water Polo Australia Hall of Fame.
