= Svetlana Kuzina =

Russian water polo player

Personal information
- Born: June 8, 1975 (age 51)
Medal record
Women's water polo
Representing Russia
Olympic Games
Bronze medal – third place	2000 Sydney	Team competition
European Championship
Bronze medal – third place	1999 Prato	Team competition
Bronze medal – third place	2001 Budapest	Team competition

Svetlana Vladimirovna Kuzina (Russian: Светлана Владимировна Кузина, born June 8, 1975) is a Russian water polo player, who won the bronze medal at the 2000 Summer Olympics.

== See also ==
- List of Olympic medalists in water polo (women)
