= Gail Miller (water polo) =

Australian water polo player

Personal information
- Born: 30 November 1976 (age 49) Canberra, Australia
Medal record
Women's water polo
Representing Australia
Olympic Games
Gold medal – first place	2000 Sydney	Team competition

Gail Louise Miller OAM (born 30 November 1976) is an Australian water polo player from the gold medal squad of the 2000 Summer Olympics.

== See also ==
- Australia women's Olympic water polo team records and statistics
- List of Olympic champions in women's water polo
- List of Olympic medalists in water polo (women)
