= Kate Hooper =

Australian water polo player

Personal information
- Born: February 26, 1978 (age 48) Auckland, New Zealand
- Home town: Perth, Australia

Sport
- Sport: Water polo
Medal record
Representing Australia
Olympic Games
Gold medal – first place	2000 Sydney	Team competition

Kate Jon-Marie Hooper OAM (born 26 February 1978) is an Australian water polo player from the gold medal squad of the 2000 Summer Olympics. Hooper plays at centre forward and is from Perth in Western Australia.

== See also ==
- List of Olympic champions in women's water polo
- List of Olympic medalists in water polo (women)
