= Liz Weekes =

Australian water polo player

Personal information
- Born: Elizabeth Jane Weekes; 22 September 1971 (age 54) Sydney, Australia
- Height: 180 cm (5 ft 11 in)
- Weight: 68 kg (150 lb)
- Spouse: Rob Scott
Medal record
Women's water polo
Representing Australia
Olympic Games
Gold medal – first place	2000 Sydney	Team competition
World Championships
Bronze medal – third place	1998 Perth	Team competition
FINA World Cup
Gold medal – first place	1995 Sydney	Team competition

Elizabeth Jane Weekes OAM (born 22 September 1971) is an Australian former water polo player from the gold medal squad of the 2000 Summer Olympics, when women's water polo was contested for the first time at the Olympic Games. She was the goalkeeper of the Australian team, which beat USA 4–3 in the final game in front of a World record attendance of 17,000 spectators. She also attended Fort Street High School.

== Personal life ==
Weekes is married to former rowing Olympian Rob Scott the CEO of the Australian listed conglomerate Wesfarmers. They have two children and live in Perth.

== See also ==
- Australia women's Olympic water polo team records and statistics
- List of Olympic champions in women's water polo
- List of Olympic medalists in water polo (women)
- List of women's Olympic water polo tournament goalkeepers
- List of World Aquatics Championships medalists in water polo
