= Heather Moody =

American water polo player (born 1973)

Personal information
- Born: August 21, 1973 (age 52) Rexburg, Idaho, United States

Sport
- Sport: Water polo
Medal record
Representing the United States
Olympic Games
Silver medal – second place	2000 Sydney	Team competition
Bronze medal – third place	2004 Athens	Team competition
World Championship
Gold medal – first place	2003 Barcelona	Team competition

Heather Moody (born August 21, 1973) is an American water polo player, who won a silver medal at the 2000 Summer Olympics. She was team captain of the US Women's National Team that captured the bronze medal at the 2004 Summer Olympics in Athens, and the only member of the team not from California. Her position is center forward.

== Life ==
Moody went to college at San Diego State University where she was a member of the Water Polo team.

In 1999 and 2001, Moody was United States Water Polo Player of the Year.

In June 2005, Bill Barnett resigned as coach of the U.S. women's water polo team because he couldn't come to terms on a contract. Heather Moody, then assistant coach, became interim head coach at the FINA World Championships in Montreal one month later. The rookie coach guided the United States to the championship game in women's water polo in July 2005, but lost to Hungary 10-7 in two overtimes. In September, Guy Baker replaced Heather Moody as head coach of the U.S. women's water polo team, leaving his positions as national team director and head coach of the U.S. men. Moody resumed the role of assistant coach.

In February 2007, Moody was inducted into the New York Athletic Club (NYAC) Hall of Fame with fellow Olympic medalists Natalie Golda and Nicolle Payne. The three women were members of the bronze medal 2004 U.S. Olympic team in Athens, and are the first women added to the NYAC Hall of Fame.

In March 2007, Moody was an assistant coach of the USA Women's National Water Polo Team, which defeated Australia to win the gold medal at the FINA Water Polo Championships. In August 2008, Moody was still in her post as an assistant coach with the USA Women's National Water Polo Team when they were defeated in the gold medal match by the Netherlands at the Olympic Games in Beijing, China. In 2010, she was inducted into the USA Water Polo Hall of Fame.

She moved from Green River, Wyoming and now lives in Sacramento, California, where she coaches boys' Varsity water polo at Rio Americano High School in addition to her work with American River Water Polo Club.

== See also ==
- United States women's Olympic water polo team records and statistics
- List of Olympic medalists in water polo (women)
- List of world champions in women's water polo
- List of World Aquatics Championships medalists in water polo
