= Melissa Byram =

Australian water polo player

Personal information
- Born: 26 December 1973 (age 52) Sydney, Australia

Sport
- Sport: Water polo
Medal record
Representing Australia
Olympic Games
Gold medal – first place	2000 Sydney	Team competition
World Championships
Bronze medal – third place	1998 Perth	Team competition

Melissa Ann Byram OAM (née Mills; born 26 December 1973) is an Australian former water polo player, who was part of the gold medal squad of the 2000 Summer Olympics.

== See also ==
- Australia women's Olympic water polo team records and statistics
