= Joanne Fox =

Australian water polo player

Personal information
- Born: 12 June 1979 (age 47) Melbourne, Victoria, Australia
Medal record
Women's water polo
Representing Australia
Olympic Games
Gold medal – first place	2000 Sydney	Team competition

Joanne Kylie Fox OAM (born 12 June 1979) is an Australian water polo player from the gold medal squad of the 2000 Summer Olympics. Fox also played on the 2004 Summer Olympics squad in Athens, Greece.

== See also ==
- Australia women's Olympic water polo team records and statistics
- List of Olympic champions in women's water polo
- List of Olympic medalists in water polo (women)
