= Water polo at the 2004 Summer Olympics – Women's team rosters =

These are the rosters of all participating teams at the women's water polo tournament at the 2004 Summer Olympics in Athens.

== Pool A ==
Abbreviations
Pos.	Position	№	Cap number
CF	Centre forward	CB	Centre back
D	Defense	GK	Goalkeeper

=== Australia ===
The following is the Australian roster in the women's water polo tournament of the 2004 Summer Olympics.

Head coach: István Gorgenyi

№	Name	Pos.	Height	Weight	Date of birth	2004 club
1	Emma Knox	GK	1.73 m (5 ft 8 in)	72 kg (159 lb)	2 March 1978	(Australia) UWA Torpedoes
2	Rebecca Rippon	D	1.65 m (5 ft 5 in)	70 kg (150 lb)	26 December 1978	(Australia) Balmain Tigers
3	Nikita Cuffe	CF	1.79 m (5 ft 10 in)	73 kg (161 lb)	26 September 1979	(Australia) KFC Queensland Breakers
4	Naomi Castle (C)	CB	1.80 m (5 ft 11 in)	72 kg (159 lb)	29 May 1974	(Australia) KFC Queensland Breakers
5	Bronwyn Smith	D	1.76 m (5 ft 9 in)	65 kg (143 lb)	3 July 1974	(Australia) KFC Queensland Breakers
6	Belinda Brooks	CB	1.76 m (5 ft 9 in)	75 kg (165 lb)	3 February 1977	(Australia) Fremantle Marlins
7	Jodie Stuhmcke	CF	1.80 m (5 ft 11 in)	75 kg (165 lb)	21 November 1980	(Australia) KFC Queensland Breakers
8	Kate Gynther	D	1.75 m (5 ft 9 in)	71 kg (157 lb)	5 July 1982	(Australia) Brisbane Barracudas
9	Elise Norwood	D	1.72 m (5 ft 8 in)	65 kg (143 lb)	18 June 1981	(Australia) Sydney University Lions
10	Kelly Heuchan	D	1.75 m (5 ft 9 in)	67 kg (148 lb)	30 January 1980	(Australia) Fremantle Marlins
11	Jemma Brownlow	GK	1.68 m (5 ft 6 in)	62 kg (137 lb)	14 November 1979	(Australia) Balmain Tigers
12	Joanne Fox	CB	1.82 m (6 ft 0 in)	72 kg (159 lb)	12 June 1979	(Australia) Balmain Tigers
13	Melissa Rippon	D	1.69 m (5 ft 7 in)	70 kg (150 lb)	20 January 1981	(Australia) Brisbane Barracudas

=== Greece ===
The following is the Greek roster in the women's water polo tournament of the 2004 Summer Olympics.

Head coach: Kyriakos Iosifidis

№	Name	Pos.	Height	Weight	Date of birth	2004 club
1	Georgia Ellinaki	GK	1.74 m (5 ft 9 in)	65 kg (143 lb)	28 February 1974	(Greece) ANO Glyfada
2	Dimitra Asilian (C)	D	1.70 m (5 ft 7 in)	60 kg (130 lb)	10 July 1972	(Greece) Olympiacos
3	Aniopi Melidoni	CB	1.71 m (5 ft 7 in)	63 kg (139 lb)	11 October 1977	(Greece) NC Vouliagmeni
4	Angeliki Karapataki	D	1.70 m (5 ft 7 in)	58 kg (128 lb)	19 February 1975	(Greece) ANO Glyfada
5	Kyriaki Liosi	D	1.70 m (5 ft 7 in)	65 kg (143 lb)	30 October 1979	(Greece) ANO Glyfada
6	Stavroula Kozompoli	CF	1.80 m (5 ft 11 in)	70 kg (150 lb)	14 January 1974	(Greece) ANO Glyfada
7	Aikaterini Oikonomopoulou	CB	1.80 m (5 ft 11 in)	60 kg (130 lb)	16 February 1978	(Greece) ANO Glyfada
8	Antigoni Roumpesi	D	1.78 m (5 ft 10 in)	77 kg (170 lb)	19 July 1983	(Greece) NC Vouliagmeni
9	Evangelia Moraitidou	CB	1.84 m (6 ft 0 in)	74 kg (163 lb)	26 March 1975	(Greece) NC Vouliagmeni
10	Eftychia Karagianni	D	1.68 m (5 ft 6 in)	61 kg (134 lb)	10 October 1973	(Greece) ANO Glyfada
11	Georgia Lara	CF	1.75 m (5 ft 9 in)	73 kg (161 lb)	31 May 1980	(Greece) NC Vouliagmeni
12	Antonia Moraiti	D	1.65 m (5 ft 5 in)	54 kg (119 lb)	2 May 1977	(Greece) ANO Glyfada
13	Anthoula Mylonaki	GK	1.78 m (5 ft 10 in)	77 kg (170 lb)	10 June 1984	(Greece) NC Vouliagmeni

=== Italy ===
The following is the Italian roster in the women's water polo tournament of the 2004 Summer Olympics.

Head coach: Pierluigi Formiconi

№	Name	Pos.	Height	Weight	Date of birth	2004 club
1	Francesca Conti	GK	1.79 m (5 ft 10 in)	71 kg (157 lb)	21 May 1972	(Italy) Geymonat Orizzonte
2	Martina Miceli	D	1.68 m (5 ft 6 in)	65 kg (143 lb)	22 October 1973	(Italy) Firenze Pallanuoto
3	Carmela Allucci (C)	D	1.67 m (5 ft 6 in)	60 kg (130 lb)	22 January 1970	(Italy) Firenze Pallanuoto
4	Silvia Bosurgi	D	1.65 m (5 ft 5 in)	61 kg (134 lb)	17 April 1979	(Italy) Geymonat Orizzonte
5	Elena Gigli	GK	1.90 m (6 ft 3 in)	70 kg (150 lb)	9 July 1985	(Italy) AS Certaldo
6	Manuela Zanchi	D	1.83 m (6 ft 0 in)	65 kg (143 lb)	17 October 1977	(Italy) Rari Nantes Pescara
7	Tania di Mario	D	1.67 m (5 ft 6 in)	59 kg (130 lb)	4 May 1979	(Italy) Geymonat Orizzonte
8	Cinzia Ragusa	CB	1.72 m (5 ft 8 in)	70 kg (150 lb)	24 May 1977	(Italy) Geymonat Orizzonte
9	Giusi Malato	CF	1.70 m (5 ft 7 in)	77 kg (170 lb)	9 July 1971	(Italy) Geymonat Orizzonte
10	Alexandra Araujo	CF	1.67 m (5 ft 6 in)	67 kg (148 lb)	13 July 1972	(Italy) GIFA Città di Palermo
11	Maddalena Musumeci	CF	1.70 m (5 ft 7 in)	63 kg (139 lb)	26 March 1976	(Italy) Geymonat Orizzonte
12	Melania Grego	D	1.71 m (5 ft 7 in)	72 kg (159 lb)	19 June 1973	(Italy) Volturno SC
13	Noémi Tóth	CB	1.80 m (5 ft 11 in)	67 kg (148 lb)	7 June 1976	(Italy) Volturno SC

=== Kazakhstan ===
The following is the Kazakh roster in the women's water polo tournament of the 2004 Summer Olympics.

Head coach: (Russia) Stanislav Pivovarov

№	Name	Pos.	Height	Weight	Date of birth	2004 club
1	Galina Rytova	GK	1.75 m (5 ft 9 in)	71 kg (157 lb)	10 September 1975	(Italy) Rari Nantes-Città di Augusta
2	Anna Zubkova	D	1.71 m (5 ft 7 in)	65 kg (143 lb)	3 February 1980	(Russia) Uralochka Zlatoust
3	Tatyana Gubina	CB	1.78 m (5 ft 10 in)	67 kg (148 lb)	15 December 1977	(Kazakhstan) Eurasia Rakhat
4	Svetlana Khapsalis	GK	1.86 m (6 ft 1 in)	63 kg (139 lb)	15 June 1973	(Kazakhstan) Eurasia Rakhat
5	Svetlana Koroleva	D	1.74 m (5 ft 9 in)	69 kg (152 lb)	7 September 1973	(Kazakhstan) Eurasia Rakhat
6	Natalya Krassilnikova	CB	1.73 m (5 ft 8 in)	63 kg (139 lb)	2 January 1982	(Kazakhstan) Eurasia Rakhat
7	Alyona Klimenko	D	1.65 m (5 ft 5 in)	56 kg (123 lb)	19 September 1982	(Kazakhstan) Eurasia Rakhat
8	Yekaterina Gariyeva	CF	1.75 m (5 ft 9 in)	72 kg (159 lb)	11 June 1981	(Kazakhstan) Eurasia Rakhat
9	Assel Jakayeva (C)	CF	1.68 m (5 ft 6 in)	70 kg (150 lb)	14 March 1980	(Russia) Kinef Kirishi
10	Marina Gritsenko	D	1.73 m (5 ft 8 in)	64 kg (141 lb)	17 August 1980	(Kazakhstan) Eurasia Rakhat
11	Larissa Mikhailova	D	1.70 m (5 ft 7 in)	67 kg (148 lb)	13 July 1981	(Russia) Uralochka Zlatoust
12	Natalya Ignatyeva	D	1.68 m (5 ft 6 in)	56 kg (123 lb)	17 August 1978	(Kazakhstan) Eurasia Rakhat
13	Irina Tolkunova	D	1.70 m (5 ft 7 in)	58 kg (128 lb)	2 June 1971	(Italy) Volturno SC

== Pool B ==
=== Canada ===
The following is the Canadian roster in the women's water polo tournament of the 2004 Summer Olympics.

Head coach: Patrick Oaten

№	Name	Pos.	Height	Weight	Date of birth	2004 club
1	Whynter Lamarre	GK	1.73 m (5 ft 8 in)	68 kg (150 lb)	14 January 1979	(Canada) Dollard Water Polo Club
2	Rachel Riddell	GK	1.83 m (6 ft 0 in)	66 kg (146 lb)	5 September 1984	(Canada) Pacific Storm Water Polo
3	Marianne Illing	D	1.74 m (5 ft 9 in)	67 kg (148 lb)	12 February 1974	(Canada) Ottawa Titans
4	Susan Gardiner	CF	1.90 m (6 ft 3 in)	95 kg (209 lb)	13 April 1980	(Canada) Pacific Storm Water Polo
5	Andrea Dewar	CF	1.78 m (5 ft 10 in)	66 kg (146 lb)	9 July 1979	(Canada) Dollard Water Polo Club
6	Marie Luc Arpin	D	1.73 m (5 ft 8 in)	68 kg (150 lb)	4 July 1978	(Canada) Sainte-Foy
7	Cora Campbell	D	1.78 m (5 ft 10 in)	62 kg (137 lb)	28 May 1974	(Canada) Calgary Renegades
8	Melissa Collins	D	1.65 m (5 ft 5 in)	61 kg (134 lb)	25 September 1976	(Canada) Dollard Water Polo Club
9	Ann Dow (C)	CB	1.64 m (5 ft 5 in)	59 kg (130 lb)	1 May 1971	(Canada) Club Aquatique de Montreal
10	Jana Salat	CB	1.74 m (5 ft 9 in)	67 kg (148 lb)	6 April 1979	(Canada) Sainte-Foy
11	Valérie Dionne	D	1.73 m (5 ft 8 in)	72 kg (159 lb)	29 July 1980	(Canada) Sainte-Foy
12	Christine Robinson	CF	1.80 m (5 ft 11 in)	80 kg (180 lb)	17 May 1984	(Canada) Dollard Water Polo Club
13	Johanne Bégin	CF	1.80 m (5 ft 11 in)	81 kg (179 lb)	21 October 1971	(Canada) Sainte-Foy

=== Hungary ===
The following is the Hungarian roster in the women's water polo tournament of the 2004 Summer Olympics.

Head coach: Tamás Faragó

№	Name	Pos.	Height	Weight	Date of birth	2004 club
1	Ildikó Zirighné Sós	GK	1.78 m (5 ft 10 in)	65 kg (143 lb)	27 December 1976	(Hungary) Dunaújvárosi FVE
2	Zsuzsanna Tiba	CF	1.75 m (5 ft 9 in)	80 kg (180 lb)	31 March 1976	(Hungary) Dunaújvárosi FVE
3	Anett Györe	D	1.72 m (5 ft 8 in)	77 kg (170 lb)	10 December 1981	(Hungary) BVSC Vízilabda
4	Dóra Kisteleki	CF	1.73 m (5 ft 8 in)	60 kg (130 lb)	11 May 1983	(Hungary) Vasas SC
5	Mercédesz Stieber (C)	D	1.74 m (5 ft 9 in)	65 kg (143 lb)	4 September 1974	(Italy) Rari Nantes Pescara
6	Erzsébet Valkai	CB	1.76 m (5 ft 9 in)	70 kg (150 lb)	6 March 1979	(Italy) Rari Nantes Pescara
7	Rita Dravucz	D	1.80 m (5 ft 11 in)	69 kg (152 lb)	14 April 1980	(Italy) Geymonat Orizzonte
8	Krisztina Zantleitner	CB	1.84 m (6 ft 0 in)	72 kg (159 lb)	8 May 1974	(Hungary) Dunaújvárosi FVE
9	Krisztina Szremkó	CB	1.81 m (5 ft 11 in)	90 kg (200 lb)	6 January 1972	(Hungary) Szentesi VK
10	Anikó Pelle	CF	1.85 m (6 ft 1 in)	72 kg (159 lb)	28 September 1978	(Italy) Geymonat Orizzonte
11	Ágnes Valkai	CF	1.68 m (5 ft 6 in)	64 kg (141 lb)	27 February 1981	(Italy) Rari Nantes Pescara
12	Ágnes Primász	CF	1.76 m (5 ft 9 in)	63 kg (139 lb)	5 March 1980	(Hungary) Dunaújvárosi FVE
13	Andrea Tóth	GK	1.83 m (6 ft 0 in)	70 kg (150 lb)	7 August 1981	(Hungary) Dunaújvárosi FVE

=== Russia ===
The following is the Russian roster in the men's water polo tournament of the 2004 Summer Olympics.

Head coach: Alexander Kleymenov

№	Name	Pos.	Height	Weight	Date of birth	2004 club
1	Valentina Vorontsova	GK	1.79 m (5 ft 10 in)	66 kg (146 lb)	26 July 1982	(Russia) SKIF-CSP Izmailovo
2	Natalia Shepelina	D	1.69 m (5 ft 7 in)	61 kg (134 lb)	24 February 1981	(Russia) Uralochka Zlatoust
3	Ekaterina Salimova	CB	1.77 m (5 ft 10 in)	70 kg (150 lb)	2 April 1982	(Russia) Uralochka Zlatoust
4	Sofia Konukh (C)	CB	1.82 m (6 ft 0 in)	72 kg (159 lb)	9 March 1980	(Russia) Kinef Kirishi
5	Elena Smurova	CF	1.78 m (5 ft 10 in)	72 kg (159 lb)	18 January 1974	(Russia) Diana Saint Petersburg
6	Galina Zlotnikova	GK	1.76 m (5 ft 9 in)	74 kg (163 lb)	24 April 1984	(Russia) Kinef Kirishi
7	Anastasia Zubkova	CB	1.73 m (5 ft 8 in)	66 kg (146 lb)	3 February 1980	(Russia) Uralochka Zlatoust
8	Svetlana Bogdanova	D	1.67 m (5 ft 6 in)	65 kg (143 lb)	3 October 1976	(Russia) Kinef Kirishi
9	Tatiana Petrova	D	1.62 m (5 ft 4 in)	63 kg (139 lb)	22 May 1973	(Russia) Uralochka Zlatoust
10	Olga Turova	CF	1.82 m (6 ft 0 in)	81 kg (179 lb)	13 March 1983	(Russia) Kinef Kirishi
11	Ekaterina Shishova	CB	1.72 m (5 ft 8 in)	59 kg (130 lb)	13 September 1978	(Russia) Uralochka Zlatoust
12	Ekaterina Vasilieva	D	1.73 m (5 ft 8 in)	68 kg (150 lb)	30 May 1976	(Russia) SKIF-CSP Izmailovo
13	Maria Yaina	D	1.74 m (5 ft 9 in)	62 kg (137 lb)	25 January 1982	(Russia) SKIF-CSP Izmailovo

=== United States ===
The following is the American roster in the women's water polo tournament of the 2004 Summer Olympics.

Head coach: Guy Baker

№	Name	Pos.	Height	Weight	Date of birth	2004 club
1	Jacqueline Frank	GK	1.80 m (5 ft 11 in)	72 kg (159 lb)	May 1, 1980	(United States) Golden West Water Polo
2	Heather Petri	D	1.80 m (5 ft 11 in)	70 kg (150 lb)	June 13, 1978	Unattached
3	Ericka Lorenz	D	1.80 m (5 ft 11 in)	71 kg (157 lb)	February 18, 1981	Unattached
4	Brenda Villa	D	1.62 m (5 ft 4 in)	80 kg (180 lb)	April 18, 1980	(United States) Commerce Water Polo
5	Ellen Estes	CF	1.82 m (6 ft 0 in)	77 kg (170 lb)	October 13, 1978	Unattached
6	Natalie Golda	CB	1.80 m (5 ft 11 in)	83 kg (183 lb)	December 18, 1981	(United States) New York Athletic Club
7	Margaret Dingeldein	D	1.67 m (5 ft 6 in)	58 kg (128 lb)	May 30, 1980	Unattached
8	Kelly Rulon	D	1.77 m (5 ft 10 in)	68 kg (150 lb)	August 16, 1984	(United States) San Diego Shores Water Polo
9	Heather Moody (C)	CF	1.82 m (6 ft 0 in)	77 kg (170 lb)	August 21, 1973	(United States) New York Athletic Club
10	Robin Beauregard	CB	1.75 m (5 ft 9 in)	81 kg (179 lb)	February 23, 1979	(United States) New York Athletic Club
11	Amber Stachowski	CB	1.82 m (6 ft 0 in)	72 kg (159 lb)	March 14, 1983	Unattached
12	Nicolle Payne	GK	1.75 m (5 ft 9 in)	72 kg (159 lb)	July 15, 1976	(United States) New York Athletic Club
13	Thalia Munro	CB	1.77 m (5 ft 10 in)	70 kg (150 lb)	March 8, 1982	Unattached
