= Water polo at the 2008 Summer Olympics – Women's team rosters =

This is a list of the players who were on the rosters of the given teams who participated in the 2008 Beijing Olympics for women's water polo. The women's tournament included eight teams, with a maximum of thirteen players per team.

Abbreviations
Pos.	Position	№	Cap number
CF	Centre forward	CB	Centre back
D	Defense	GK	Goalkeeper

== Pool A ==
=== China ===
The following is the Chinese roster in the women's water polo tournament of the 2008 Summer Olympics.

№	Name	Pos.	Height	Weight	Date of birth	Club
1	Yang Jun	GK	1.82 m (6 ft 0 in)	70 kg (150 lb)	28 April 1988	(China) Tianjin
2	Teng Fei	D	1.70 m (5 ft 7 in)	65 kg (143 lb)	23 January 1988	(China) Tianjin
3	Liu Ping	CB	1.74 m (5 ft 9 in)	70 kg (150 lb)	1 May 1987	(China) Tianjin
4	Sun Yujun	D	1.68 m (5 ft 6 in)	65 kg (143 lb)	30 January 1987	(China) Tianjin
5	He Jin	CF	1.80 m (5 ft 11 in)	90 kg (200 lb)	3 May 1987	(China) Tianjin
6	Sun Yating	CF	1.80 m (5 ft 11 in)	75 kg (165 lb)	24 February 1988	(China) Tianjin
7	Wang Ying	CB	1.86 m (6 ft 1 in)	78 kg (172 lb)	7 August 1988	(China) Guangxi
8	Gao Ao	D	1.71 m (5 ft 7 in)	73 kg (161 lb)	26 July 1990	(China) Tianjin
9	Wang Yi	D	1.79 m (5 ft 10 in)	70 kg (150 lb)	29 July 1987	(China) Guangxi
10	Ma Huanhuan	CB	1.78 m (5 ft 10 in)	72 kg (159 lb)	13 January 1990	(China) Guangxi
11	Sun Huizi	CB	1.80 m (5 ft 11 in)	70 kg (150 lb)	11 June 1990	(China) Sichuan
12	Qiao Leiying	D	1.76 m (5 ft 9 in)	73 kg (161 lb)	24 August 1989	(China) Sichuan
13	Tan Ying	GK	1.84 m (6 ft 0 in)	75 kg (165 lb)	30 June 1987	(China) Sichuan

Head coach: Juan Jane Giralt

=== Italy ===
The following is the Italian roster in the women's water polo tournament of the 2008 Summer Olympics.

№	Name	Pos.	Height	Weight	Date of birth	Club
1	Elena Gigli	GK	1.92 m (6 ft 4 in)	82 kg (181 lb)	9 July 1985	(Italy) Giotti Fiorentina
2	Martina Miceli	D	1.68 m (5 ft 6 in)	62 kg (137 lb)	22 October 1973	(Italy) Geymonat Orizzonte
3	Elisa Casanova	CF	1.86 m (6 ft 1 in)	100 kg (220 lb)	26 November 1973	(Italy) Giotti Fiorentina
4	Silvia Bosurgi	D	1.64 m (5 ft 5 in)	59 kg (130 lb)	17 April 1979	(Italy) Geymonat Orizzonte
5	Erzsebet Valkai	CF	1.76 m (5 ft 9 in)	74 kg (163 lb)	6 March 1979	(Italy) Ecofim Roma
6	Manuela Zanchi	D	1.83 m (6 ft 0 in)	65 kg (143 lb)	17 October 1977	(Italy) Geymonat Orizzonte
7	Tania di Mario	D	1.68 m (5 ft 6 in)	53 kg (117 lb)	5 April 1979	(Italy) Geymonat Orizzonte
8	Cinzia Ragusa	CB	1.79 m (5 ft 10 in)	70 kg (150 lb)	24 May 1977	(Italy) Geymonat Orizzonte
9	Francesca Pavan	D	1.73 m (5 ft 8 in)	65 kg (143 lb)	24 April 1979	(Italy) Plebiscito Padova
10	Federica Rocco	CB	1.73 m (5 ft 8 in)	70 kg (150 lb)	25 November 1984	(Italy) Plebiscito Padova
11	Maddalena Musumeci	CB	1.70 m (5 ft 7 in)	65 kg (143 lb)	26 March 1976	(Italy) Geymonat Orizzonte
12	Teresa Frassinetti	CF	1.74 m (5 ft 9 in)	70 kg (150 lb)	24 December 1985	(Italy) Giotti Fiorentina
13	Chiara Brancati	GK	1.78 m (5 ft 10 in)	65 kg (143 lb)	20 July 1981	(Italy) Geymonat Orizzonte

Head coach: Mauro Maugeri

=== Russia ===
The following is the Russian roster in the women's water polo tournament of the 2008 Summer Olympics.

№	Name	Pos.	Height	Weight	Date of birth	Club
1	Valentina Vorontsova	GK	1.70 m (5 ft 7 in)	65 kg (143 lb)	26 July 1982	(Russia) Kinef Kirishi
2	Natalia Shepelina	D	1.67 m (5 ft 6 in)	63 kg (139 lb)	24 February 1981	(Russia) Uralochka Zlatoust
3	Ekaterina Prokofyeva	D	1.66 m (5 ft 5 in)	63 kg (139 lb)	13 March 1991	(Russia) Yunost Volgograd
4	Sofia Konukh	CB	1.73 m (5 ft 8 in)	61 kg (134 lb)	9 March 1980	(Russia) Kinef Kirishi
5	Alena Vylegzhanina	CB	1.75 m (5 ft 9 in)	70 kg (150 lb)	14 August 1987	(Russia) Uralochka Zlatoust
6	Nadezda Glyzina	D	1.70 m (5 ft 7 in)	65 kg (143 lb)	20 May 1988	(Russia) Kinef Kirishi
7	Ekaterina Pantyulina	D	1.74 m (5 ft 9 in)	62 kg (137 lb)	6 October 1989	(Russia) Kinef Kirishi
8	Evgenia Soboleva	CB	1.78 m (5 ft 10 in)	70 kg (150 lb)	26 August 1988	(Russia) Kinef Kirishi
9	Oleksandra Karpovich	CF	1.60 m (5 ft 3 in)	55 kg (121 lb)	6 June 1986	(Russia) SKIF Moscow
10	Olga Belyaeva	CF	1.73 m (5 ft 8 in)	64 kg (141 lb)	18 March 1985	(Russia) Kinef Kirishi
11	Elena Smurova	CB	1.66 m (5 ft 5 in)	60 kg (130 lb)	18 January 1974	(Russia) Kinef Kirishi
12	Olga Turova	CF	1.75 m (5 ft 9 in)	60 kg (130 lb)	13 March 1983	(Russia) Yunost Volgograd
13	Evgeniya Protsenko	GK	1.75 m (5 ft 9 in)	64 kg (141 lb)	25 November 1983	(Russia) Uralochka Zlatoust

Head coach: Alexander Kleymenov

=== United States ===
The following is the American roster in the women's water polo tournament of the 2008 Summer Olympics.

№	Name	Pos.	Height	Weight	Date of birth	Club
1	Elizabeth Armstrong	GK	1.85 m (6 ft 1 in)	79 kg (174 lb)	31 January 1983	(United States) Great Lakes Ann Arbor
2	Heather Petri	D	1.80 m (5 ft 11 in)	75 kg (165 lb)	13 June 1978	(United States) The New York Athletic Club
3	Brittany Hayes	D	1.70 m (5 ft 7 in)	72 kg (159 lb)	7 February 1985	(United States) Socal Tustin
4	Brenda Villa	D	1.63 m (5 ft 4 in)	79 kg (174 lb)	18 April 1980	(Italy) Orizzonta Catania
5	Lauren Wenger	CF	1.91 m (6 ft 3 in)	77 kg (170 lb)	11 March 1984	(Greece) Glyfada Athens
6	Natalie Golda	CB	1.80 m (5 ft 11 in)	84 kg (185 lb)	28 December 1981	(United States) The New York Athletic Club
7	Patty Cardenas	D	1.70 m (5 ft 7 in)	73 kg (161 lb)	19 August 1984	(United States) Commerce
8	Jessica Steffens	CF	1.83 m (6 ft 0 in)	77 kg (170 lb)	7 April 1987	(United States) Sunset San Diego
9	Elsie Windes	CB	1.78 m (5 ft 10 in)	79 kg (174 lb)	17 June 1985	(United States) Tualatin Hills
10	Alison Gregorka	CB	1.78 m (5 ft 10 in)	73 kg (161 lb)	29 June 1985	(United States) Great Lakes Ann Arbor
11	Moriah van Norman	CF	1.78 m (5 ft 10 in)	95 kg (209 lb)	30 May 1984	(United States) The New York Athletic Club
12	Kami Craig	CF	1.80 m (5 ft 11 in)	91 kg (201 lb)	21 July 1987	(United States) Santa Barbara
13	Jamie Hipp	GK	1.83 m (6 ft 0 in)	73 kg (161 lb)	1 September 1981	(Spain) CN Ondaretta Alcorcón

Head coach: Guy Baker

== Group B ==
=== Australia ===
The following is the Australian roster in the women's water polo tournament of the 2008 Summer Olympics.

№	Name	Pos.	Height	Weight	Date of birth	Club
1	Emma Knox	GK	1.73 m (5 ft 8 in)	70 kg (150 lb)	2 March 1978	(Australia) Fremantle Perth
2	Gemma Beadsworth	CF	1.80 m (5 ft 11 in)	83 kg (183 lb)	17 July 1987	(Australia) Fremantle Perth
3	Nikita Cuffe	CF	1.79 m (5 ft 10 in)	73 kg (161 lb)	26 September 1979	(Australia) Sydney Uni
4	Rebecca Rippon	D	1.67 m (5 ft 6 in)	72 kg (159 lb)	26 December 1978	(Australia) Balmain Tigers
5	Suzie Fraser	D	1.75 m (5 ft 9 in)	63 kg (139 lb)	27 August 1983	(Australia) KFC Breakers Brisbane
6	Bronwen Knox	CF	1.82 m (6 ft 0 in)	88 kg (194 lb)	16 April 1986	(Australia) KFC Breakers Brisbane
7	Taniele Gofers	CF	1.83 m (6 ft 0 in)	80 kg (180 lb)	12 June 1985	(Australia) Sydney Uni
8	Kate Gynther	D	1.75 m (5 ft 9 in)	73 kg (161 lb)	5 July 1982	(Australia) Brisbane Barras
9	Jenna Santoromito	D	1.69 m (5 ft 7 in)	65 kg (143 lb)	21 January 1987	(Australia) Cronulla Sharks
10	Mia Santoromito	CB	1.69 m (5 ft 7 in)	80 kg (180 lb)	29 March 1985	(Australia) Cronulla Sharks
11	Melissa Rippon	D	1.69 m (5 ft 7 in)	70 kg (150 lb)	20 January 1981	(Australia) Brisbane Barras
12	Amy Hetzel	D	1.78 m (5 ft 10 in)	65 kg (143 lb)	27 April 1983	(Australia) KFC Breakers Brisbane
13	Alicia McCormack	GK	1.67 m (5 ft 6 in)	76 kg (168 lb)	7 June 1983	(Australia) Cronulla Sharks

Head coach: Greg McFadden

=== Greece ===
The following is the Greek roster in the women's water polo tournament of the 2008 Summer Olympics.

№	Name	Pos.	Height	Weight	Date of birth	Club
1	Georgia Ellinaki	GK	1.74 m (5 ft 9 in)	64 kg (141 lb)	28 February 1974	(Greece) Ethnikos Piraeus
2	Christina Tsoukala	CB	1.84 m (6 ft 0 in)	80 kg (180 lb)	8 July 1991	(Greece) Vouliagmeni
3	Angeliki Gerolymou	D	1.68 m (5 ft 6 in)	70 kg (150 lb)	22 June 1982	(Greece) Vouliagmeni
4	Sofia Iosifidou	CB	1.73 m (5 ft 8 in)	61 kg (134 lb)	13 January 1981	(Greece) Ethnikos Piraeus
5	Kyriaki Liosi	D	1.70 m (5 ft 7 in)	63 kg (139 lb)	30 October 1979	(Greece) Vouliagmeni
6	Stavroula Kozompoli	CF	1.80 m (5 ft 11 in)	73 kg (161 lb)	14 January 1974	(Greece) Nireas Chalandriou
7	Aikaterini Oikonomopoulou	CB	1.80 m (5 ft 11 in)	60 kg (130 lb)	16 February 1978	(Greece) ANO Glyfada
8	Antigoni Roumpesi	D	1.77 m (5 ft 10 in)	80 kg (180 lb)	19 July 1983	(Greece) Vouliagmeni
9	Evangelia Moraitidou	CB	1.84 m (6 ft 0 in)	74 kg (163 lb)	16 March 1975	(Greece) ANO Glyfada
10	Alexandra Asimaki	CF	1.71 m (5 ft 7 in)	61 kg (134 lb)	28 June 1988	(Greece) Vouliagmeni
11	Stavroula Antonakou	D	1.70 m (5 ft 7 in)	57 kg (126 lb)	2 May 1982	(Greece) Ethnikos Piraeus
12	Georgia Lara	CF	1.75 m (5 ft 9 in)	78 kg (172 lb)	31 May 1980	(Greece) Vouliagmeni
13	Maria Tsouri	GK	1.66 m (5 ft 5 in)	60 kg (130 lb)	25 May 1986	(Greece) ANO Glyfada

Head coach: Kyriakos Iosifidis

=== Hungary ===
The following is the Hungarian roster in the women's water polo tournament of the 2008 Summer Olympics.

№	Name	Pos.	Height	Weight	Date of birth	Club
1	Patricia Horvath	GK	1.83 m (6 ft 0 in)	73 kg (161 lb)	7 December 1977	(Hungary) Honvéd-Domino
2	Krisztina Szremkó	CB	1.80 m (5 ft 11 in)	84 kg (185 lb)	6 January 1972	(Hungary) Szentes
3	Anett Györe	D	1.72 m (5 ft 8 in)	70 kg (150 lb)	10 December 1981	(Hungary) Honvéd-Domino
4	Dóra Kisteleki	D	1.73 m (5 ft 8 in)	62 kg (137 lb)	11 May 1983	(Hungary) Honvéd-Domino
5	Mercédesz Stieber	D	1.74 m (5 ft 9 in)	70 kg (150 lb)	4 September 1974	(Italy) Florence
6	Orsolya Takács	D	1.90 m (6 ft 3 in)	85 kg (187 lb)	20 May 1985	(Hungary) Ocmino-Erse
7	Rita Drávucz	D	1.80 m (5 ft 11 in)	66 kg (146 lb)	14 April 1980	(Italy) Florence
8	Krisztina Zantleitner	CB	1.84 m (6 ft 0 in)	72 kg (159 lb)	8 May 1974	(Hungary) Osc Budapest
9	Fruzsina Brávik	D	1.81 m (5 ft 11 in)	83 kg (183 lb)	6 October 1986	(Hungary) Dove Dunaújváros
10	Anikó Pelle	D	1.86 m (6 ft 1 in)	72 kg (159 lb)	28 September 1978	(Italy) Siracusa
11	Ágnes Valkai	D	1.68 m (5 ft 6 in)	64 kg (141 lb)	27 February 1981	(Italy) Rome
12	Ágnes Primász	D	1.77 m (5 ft 10 in)	65 kg (143 lb)	5 March 1980	(Hungary) Osc Budapest
13	Ildikó Zirighné Sós	GK	1.76 m (5 ft 9 in)	67 kg (148 lb)	27 December 1976	(Hungary) Osc Budapest

Head coach: Gabor Godova

=== Netherlands ===
The following is the Dutch roster in the women's water polo tournament of the 2008 Summer Olympics.

№	Name	Pos.	Height	Weight	Date of birth	Club
1	Ilse van der Meijden	GK	1.85 m (6 ft 1 in)	71 kg (157 lb)	22 October 1988	(Netherlands) Brandenburg Bilthoven
2	Yasemin Smit	CB	1.78 m (5 ft 10 in)	70 kg (150 lb)	21 November 1984	(Netherlands) Het Ravijn Nijverdal
3	Mieke Cabout	D	1.82 m (6 ft 0 in)	70 kg (150 lb)	30 March 1986	(Netherlands) ZVL Leiden
4	Biurakn Hakhverdian	D	1.72 m (5 ft 8 in)	65 kg (143 lb)	4 October 1985	(Netherlands) Polar Bears
5	Marieke van den Ham	D	1.69 m (5 ft 7 in)	80 kg (180 lb)	21 January 1983	(Netherlands) Polar Bears
6	Daniëlle de Bruijn	D	1.72 m (5 ft 8 in)	68 kg (150 lb)	13 February 1978	(Netherlands) Widex GZC Donk Gouda
7	Iefke van Belkum	CF	1.85 m (6 ft 1 in)	75 kg (165 lb)	22 July 1986	(Netherlands) ZVL Leiden
8	Noeki Klein	CF	1.79 m (5 ft 10 in)	80 kg (180 lb)	28 April 1983	(Netherlands) ZVL Leiden
9	Gillian van den Berg	D	1.73 m (5 ft 8 in)	66 kg (146 lb)	8 September 1971	(Netherlands) De Gouwe Waddinxveen
10	Alette Sijbring	CB	1.74 m (5 ft 9 in)	68 kg (150 lb)	20 March 1982	(Netherlands) TWZ Zaandam
11	Rianne Guichelaar	D	1.74 m (5 ft 9 in)	63 kg (139 lb)	16 August 1983	(Netherlands) Het Ravijn Nijverdal
12	Simone Koot	D	1.73 m (5 ft 8 in)	65 kg (143 lb)	12 November 1980	(Netherlands) Brandenburg Bilthoven
13	Meike de Nooy	GK	1.85 m (6 ft 1 in)	73 kg (161 lb)	2 May 1983	(Netherlands) Het Ravijn Nijverdal

Head coach: Robin van Galen

== See also ==
- Water polo at the 2008 Summer Olympics – Men's team rosters
