= Rosemary Morris (water polo) =

British water polo player

Personal information
- Born: 31 January 1986 (age 39)
- Height: 1.8 m (5 ft 11 in)
- Weight: 69 kg (152 lb)

Sport
- Country: United Kingdom
- Sport: Water polo

Rosemary Morris also known as Rosie Morris (born 31 January 1986) is a British water polo player. She competed for Great Britain in the women's tournament at the 2012 Summer Olympics. This was the first ever Olympic GB women's water polo team.

She competed at the 2013 World Aquatics Championships.

== See also ==
- List of women's Olympic water polo tournament goalkeepers
