= Robyn Nicholls =

British water polo player

Personal information
- Born: 8 May 1990 (age 35); Bolton, Great Britain
- Nationality: United Kingdom
- Height: 178 cm (5.84 ft)
- Weight: 65 kg (143 lb)

Robyn Nicholls (born 8 May 1990) is a British water polo player. She competed for Great Britain in the women's tournament at the 2012 Summer Olympics. This was the first ever Olympic GB women's water polo team.

== Career ==
Nicholls represented Britain at the European Nations Trophy in 2009, earning a gold medal. In 2010, she played professionally in Hungary, and later played club polo with City of Manchester. She was selected as a member of the 2012 Olympic squad.

== Personal life ==
Nicholls was educated at Fred Longworth High School before studying economics at Manchester Metropolitan University. She developed an interest in water polo after watching her brother play as a child. She took up playing the game for herself aged 12 and also participated in swimming, running, triathlon, hockey and badminton.

== See also ==
- List of women's Olympic water polo tournament goalkeepers
