= Greece women's Olympic water polo team records and statistics =

This article lists various water polo records and statistics in relation to the Greece women's national water polo team at the Summer Olympics.

The Greece women's national water polo team has participated in 2 of 5 official women's water polo tournaments.

== Abbreviations ==
Apps	Appearances	Rk	Rank	Ref	Reference	Cap No.	Water polo cap number
Pos	Playing position	FP	Field player	GK	Goalkeeper	ISHOF	International Swimming Hall of Fame
L/R	Handedness	L	Left-handed	R	Right-handed	Oly debut	Olympic debut in water polo
(C)	Captain	p.	page	pp.	pages		

== Team statistics ==
=== Comprehensive results by tournament ===
Note: Results of Olympic qualification tournaments are not included. Last updated: 5 May 2021.

Legend

- 1st – Champions
- 2nd – Runners-up
- 3rd – Third place
- 4th – Fourth place
- Q – Qualified for forthcoming tournament
- – Hosts

Women's team	2000	2004	2008	2012	2016	2020	Years
Greece		2nd	8th				2
Total teams	6	8	8	8	8	10	

=== Number of appearances ===
Last updated: 5 May 2021.

Legend

- Year^{*} – As host team

Women's team	Apps	Record streak	Active streak	Debut	Most recent	Best finish	Confederation
Greece	2	2	0	2004^{*}	2008	Runners-up	Europe – LEN

=== Best finishes ===
Last updated: 5 May 2021.

Legend

- Year^{*} – As host team

Women's team	Best finish	Apps	Confederation
Greece	Runners-up (2004^{*})	2	Europe – LEN

=== Finishes in the top four ===
Last updated: 5 May 2021.

Legend

- Year^{*} – As host team

Women's team	Total	Champions	Runners-up	Third place	Fourth place	First	Last
Greece	1		1 (2004^{*})			2004	2004

=== Medal table ===
Last updated: 5 May 2021.

Women's team	Gold	Silver	Bronze	Total
Greece (GRE)	0	1	0	1

== Player statistics ==
=== Multiple appearances ===
The following table is pre-sorted by number of Olympic appearances (in descending order), year of the last Olympic appearance (in ascending order), year of the first Olympic appearance (in ascending order), date of birth (in ascending order), name of the player (in ascending order), respectively.

- Number of three-time Olympians: 0
- Number of two-time Olympians: 7
- Last updated: 5 May 2021.

Legend

- – Hosts

Female athletes who competed in water polo at two or more Olympics
Apps	Player	Birth	Pos	Water polo tournaments					Age of first/last	ISHOF member	Note	Ref
Apps	Player	Birth	Pos	1	2	3	4	5	Age of first/last	ISHOF member	Note	Ref
2	Stavroula Kozompoli	1974	FP	2004	2008				30/34			
2	Georgia Ellinaki	1974	GK	2004	2008				30/34			
2	Evangelia Moraitidou	1975	FP	2004	2008				29/33			
2	Aikaterini Oikonomopoulou	1978	FP	2004	2008				26/30			
2	Kyriaki Liosi	1979	FP	2004	2008				24/28			
2	Georgia Lara	1980	FP	2004	2008				24/28			
2	Antigoni Roumpesi	1983	FP	2004	2008				21/25			

=== Multiple medalists ===
The following table is pre-sorted by total number of Olympic medals (in descending order), number of Olympic gold medals (in descending order), number of Olympic silver medals (in descending order), year of receiving the last Olympic medal (in ascending order), year of receiving the first Olympic medal (in ascending order), name of the player (in ascending order), respectively.

- Number of three-time Olympic medalists: 0
- Number of two-time Olympic medalists: 0
- Last updated: 1 May 2021.

=== Top goalscorers ===
The following table is pre-sorted by number of total goals (in descending order), year of the last Olympic appearance (in ascending order), year of the first Olympic appearance (in ascending order), name of the player (in ascending order), respectively.

- Number of goalscorers (40+ goals): 0
- Number of goalscorers (30–39 goals): 0
- Number of goalscorers (20–29 goals): 0
- Last updated: 1 April 2021.

=== Goalkeepers ===
The following table is pre-sorted by edition of the Olympics (in ascending order), cap number or name of the goalkeeper (in ascending order), respectively.

Last updated: 1 April 2021.

Legend and abbreviation

- – Hosts
- Eff % – Save efficiency (Saves / Shots)

Year	Cap No.	Goalkeeper	Birth	Age	Saves	Shots	Eff %	ISHOF member	Note	Ref
2004 (silver)	1	Georgia Ellinaki	1974	30	40	73	54.8%		Starting goalkeeper	
2004 (silver)	13	Anthoula Mylonaki	1984	20	5	8	62.5%			
2008	1	Georgia Ellinaki (2)	1974	34	13	28	46.4%			
2008	13	Maria Tsouri	1986	22	33	57	57.9%			
Year	Cap No.	Goalkeeper	Birth	Age	Saves	Shots	Eff %	ISHOF member	Note	Ref

- Official Results Books (PDF): 2004 (pp. 64–65), 2008 (pp. 62–63).

=== Top sprinters ===
The following table is pre-sorted by number of total sprints won (in descending order), year of the last Olympic appearance (in ascending order), year of the first Olympic appearance (in ascending order), name of the sprinter (in ascending order), respectively.

* Number of sprinters (30+ sprints won): 0

- Number of sprinters (20–29 sprints won): 1
- Number of sprinters (10–19 sprints won): 0
- Number of sprinters (5–9 sprints won): 0
- Last updated: 15 May 2021.

Legend and abbreviation

- – Hosts
- Eff % – Efficiency (Sprints won / Sprints contested)

Female players with 5 or more sprints won at the Olympics
Rk	Sprinter	Birth	Total sprints won	Total sprints contested	Eff %	Water polo tournaments (sprints won / contested)					Age of first/last	ISHOF member	Note	Ref
Rk	Sprinter	Birth	Total sprints won	Total sprints contested	Eff %	1	2	3	4	5	Age of first/last	ISHOF member	Note	Ref
1	Kyriaki Liosi	1979	28	39	71.8%	2004 (21/23)	2008 (7/16)				24/28			

- Official Results Books (PDF): 2004 (pp. 64–65), 2008 (pp. 62–63).

== See also ==
- Greece men's Olympic water polo team records and statistics
- List of women's Olympic water polo tournament records and statistics
- Lists of Olympic water polo records and statistics
- Greece at the Olympics

== Sources ==
=== Official Results Books (IOC) ===
PDF documents in the LA84 Foundation Digital Library:

- Official Results Book – 2000 Olympic Games – Water Polo (download, archive)
- Official Results Book – 2004 Olympic Games – Water Polo (download, archive)
- Official Results Book – 2008 Olympic Games – Water Polo (download, archive)

PDF documents on the FINA website:

- Official Results Book – 2012 Olympic Games – Diving, Swimming, Synchronised Swimming, Water Polo (archive) (pp. 284–507)

PDF documents in the Olympic World Library:

- Official Results Book – 2016 Olympic Games – Water Polo (archive)

PDF documents on the International Olympic Committee website:

- Official Results Book – 2020 Olympic Games – Water Polo (archive)
- Official Results Book – 2024 Olympic Games – Water Polo

=== Official Reports (FINA) ===
PDF documents on the FINA website:

- HistoFINA – Water polo medalists and statistics (as of September 2019) (archive) (p. 56)
- 1870–2020 | 150 years of Water Polo – Evolution of its rules (archive)

=== Official website (IOC) ===
Water polo on the International Olympic Committee website:

- Water polo
- Women's water polo

=== Olympedia ===
Water polo on the Olympedia website:

- Water polo
- Women's water polo
- Athlete count for water polo
- Water polo venues
- Water polo at the 2000 Summer Olympics (women's tournament)
- Water polo at the 2004 Summer Olympics (women's tournament)
- Water polo at the 2008 Summer Olympics (women's tournament)
- Water polo at the 2012 Summer Olympics (women's tournament)
- Water polo at the 2016 Summer Olympics (women's tournament)
- Water polo at the 2020 Summer Olympics (women's tournament)

=== Sports Reference ===
Water polo on the Sports Reference website:

- Country Medal Leaders & Athlete Medal Leaders (1900–2016) (archived)
- Women's water polo (2000–2016) (archived)
- Water polo at the 2000 Summer Games (women's tournament) (archived)
- Water polo at the 2004 Summer Games (women's tournament) (archived)
- Water polo at the 2008 Summer Games (women's tournament) (archived)
- Water polo at the 2012 Summer Games (women's tournament) (archived)
- Water polo at the 2016 Summer Games (women's tournament) (archived)

=== Todor66 ===
Water polo on the Todor66 website:

- Water polo at the Summer Games
- Water polo at the 2000 Summer Olympics (women's tournament, women's qualification)
- Water polo at the 2004 Summer Olympics (women's tournament, women's qualification)
- Water polo at the 2008 Summer Olympics (women's tournament, women's qualification)
- Water polo at the 2012 Summer Olympics (women's tournament, women's qualification)
- Water polo at the 2016 Summer Olympics (women's tournament, women's qualification)
- Water polo at the 2020 Summer Olympics (women's tournament, women's qualification)

=== ISHOF ===
International Swimming Hall of Fame (ISHOF) website:

- Honorees Listed by Category – Water Polo
- Honorees Listed by Category – Coaches
- Honorees Listed by Category – Contributors
- Honorees by Country
- Honorees By Last Name
