= List of women's Olympic water polo tournament goalkeepers =

This is a list of female goalkeepers who have been named in the national water polo team for the Summer Olympics.

== Abbreviations ==
| GK | Goalkeeper | Rk | Rank | Ref | Reference | Cap No. | Water polo cap number |
| (C) | Captain | p. | page | pp. | pages | ISHOF | International Swimming Hall of Fame |

== Winning goalkeepers ==
The following table is pre-sorted by edition of the Olympics (in ascending order), cap number or name of the goalkeeper (in ascending order), respectively. Last updated: 1 April 2021.

Legend and abbreviation

- Team – Olympic winning streak (winning three or more Olympic titles in a row)
- Team – Winning all matches during the tournament
- Team – Host team
- Eff % – Save efficiency (Saves / Shots)

Winning goalkeepers by tournament
| Year | Winning team | Cap | Goalkeeper | Birth | Age | Height | Saves | Shots | Eff % | Note | Ref |
|---|---|---|---|---|---|---|---|---|---|---|---|
| 2000 | Australia (1st title) | 1 | Liz Weekes | 1971 | 29 | 1.80 m (5 ft 11 in) | 21 | 46 | 45.7% | Starting GK | |
| 2000 | Australia (1st title) | 7 | Danielle Woodhouse | 1969 | 31 | 1.73 m (5 ft 8 in) | 11 | 15 | 73.3% | | |
| 2004 | Italy (1st title) | 1 | Francesca Conti | 1972 | 32 | 1.79 m (5 ft 10 in) | 39 | 72 | 54.2% | Starting GK | |
| 2004 | Italy (1st title) | 5 | Elena Gigli | 1985 | 19 | 1.90 m (6 ft 3 in) | 0 | 0 | — | | |
| 2008 | Netherlands (1st title) | 1 | Ilse van der Meijden | 1988 | 19 | 1.85 m (6 ft 1 in) | 45 | 98 | 45.9% | Starting GK | |
| 2008 | Netherlands (1st title) | 13 | Meike de Nooy | 1983 | 25 | 1.85 m (6 ft 1 in) | 0 | 0 | — | | |
| 2012 | United States (1st title) | 1 | Elizabeth Armstrong | 1983 | 29 | 1.88 m (6 ft 2 in) | 53 | 101 | 52.5% | Starting GK | |
| 2012 | United States (1st title) | 13 | Tumua Anae | 1988 | 23 | 1.80 m (5 ft 11 in) | 0 | 0 | — | | |
| 2016 | United States (2nd title) | 1 | Samantha Hill | 1992 | 24 | 1.83 m (6 ft 0 in) | 6 | 10 | 60.0% | | |
| 2016 | United States (2nd title) | 13 | Ashleigh Johnson | 1994 | 21 | 1.86 m (6 ft 1 in) | 51 | 79 | 64.6% | Starting GK | |
| Year | Winning team | Cap | Goalkeeper | Birth | Age | Height | Saves | Shots | Eff % | Note | Ref |

- Official Results Books (PDF): 2000 (p. 96), 2004 (pp. 72–73), 2008 (pp. 71–72), 2012 (pp. 368–369), 2016 (pp. 218–219).

== Records and statistics ==
=== Age records ===
The following tables show the oldest and youngest water polo goalkeepers in the women's Olympic water polo tournament. Last updated: 1 April 2021.

==== Oldest goalkeepers ====
Legend

- Team – Host team

Top 10 oldest female water polo goalkeepers
| Rk | Goalkeeper | Age of the last Olympic match | Women's team | Date of birth | Date of the last Olympic match | Ref |
|---|---|---|---|---|---|---|
| 1 | Hellen Boering | 36 years, 58 days | Netherlands | 27 July 1964 | 23 September 2000 | |
| 2 | Georgia Ellinaki | 34 years, 171 days | Greece | 28 February 1974 | 17 August 2008 | |
| 3 | Ana Copado | 32 years, 131 days | Spain | 31 March 1980 | 9 August 2012 | |
| 4 | Francesca Conti | 32 years, 97 days | Italy | 21 May 1972 | 26 August 2004 | |
| 5 | Karla Plugge | 31 years, 350 days | Netherlands | 9 October 1968 | 23 September 2000 | |
| 6 | Danielle Woodhouse | 31 years, 244 days | Australia | 23 January 1969 | 23 September 2000 | |
| 7 | Ildikó Sós | 31 years, 238 days | Hungary | 27 December 1976 | 21 August 2008 | |
| 8 | Svetlana Buravova-Khapsalis | 31 years, 68 days | Kazakhstan | 15 June 1973 | 22 August 2004 | |
| 9 | Isabelle Auger | 31 years, 27 days | Canada | 26 August 1969 | 22 September 2000 | |
| 10 | Patrícia Horváth | 30 years, 258 days | Hungary | 7 December 1977 | 21 August 2008 | |

Top 3 oldest female water polo goalkeepers, Olympic gold medalists
| Rk | Goalkeeper | Age of receiving the last Olympic gold medal | Women's team | Date of birth | Date of receiving the last Olympic gold medal | Ref |
|---|---|---|---|---|---|---|
| 1 | Francesca Conti | 32 years, 97 days | Italy | 21 May 1972 | 26 August 2004 | |
| 2 | Danielle Woodhouse | 31 years, 244 days | Australia | 23 January 1969 | 23 September 2000 | |
| 3 | Elizabeth Armstrong | 29 years, 191 days | United States | 31 January 1983 | 9 August 2012 | |

Top 3 oldest female water polo goalkeepers, Olympic silver medalists
| Rk | Goalkeeper | Age of receiving the last Olympic silver medal | Women's team | Date of birth | Date of receiving the last Olympic silver medal | Ref |
|---|---|---|---|---|---|---|
| 1 | Ana Copado | 32 years, 131 days | Spain | 31 March 1980 | 9 August 2012 | |
| 2 | Georgia Ellinaki | 30 years, 180 days | Greece | 28 February 1974 | 26 August 2004 | |
| 3 | Jaime Komer | 26 years, 355 days | United States | 1 September 1981 | 21 August 2008 | |

Top 3 oldest female water polo goalkeepers, Olympic bronze medalists
| Rk | Goalkeeper | Age of receiving the last Olympic bronze medal | Women's team | Date of birth | Date of receiving the last Olympic bronze medal | Ref |
|---|---|---|---|---|---|---|
| 1 | Emma Knox | 30 years, 172 days | Australia | 2 March 1978 | 21 August 2008 | |
| 2 | Alicia McCormack | 29 years, 63 days | Australia | 7 June 1983 | 9 August 2012 | |
| 3 | Nicolle Payne | 28 years, 42 days | United States | 15 July 1976 | 26 August 2004 | |

==== Youngest goalkeepers ====
Legend

- Team – Host team

Top 10 youngest female water polo goalkeepers
| Rk | Goalkeeper | Age of the first Olympic match | Women's team | Date of birth | Date of the first Olympic match | Ref |
|---|---|---|---|---|---|---|
| 1 | Anna Karnaukh | 18 years, 334 days | Russia | 31 August 1993 | 30 July 2012 | |
| 2 | Elena Gigli | 19 years, 38 days | Italy | 9 July 1985 | 16 August 2004 | |
| 3 | Ilse van der Meijden | 19 years, 294 days | Netherlands | 22 October 1988 | 11 August 2008 | |
| 4 | Rachel Riddell | 19 years, 346 days | Canada | 5 September 1984 | 16 August 2004 | |
| 5 | Victória Chamorro | 20 years, 30 days | Brazil | 10 July 1996 | 9 August 2016 | |
| 6 | Anthoula Mylonaki | 20 years, 67 days | Greece | 10 June 1984 | 16 August 2004 | |
| 7 | Yang Jun | 20 years, 105 days | China | 28 April 1988 | 11 August 2008 | |
| 8 | Galina Zlotnikova | 20 years, 114 days | Russia | 24 April 1984 | 16 August 2004 | |
| 9 | Irina Borodavko | 20 years, 317 days | Kazakhstan | 4 November 1979 | 16 September 2000 | |
| 10 | Tan Ying | 21 years, 42 days | China | 30 June 1987 | 11 August 2008 | |

Top 3 youngest female water polo goalkeepers, Olympic gold medalists
| Rk | Goalkeeper | Age of receiving the first Olympic gold medal | Women's team | Date of birth | Date of receiving the first Olympic gold medal | Ref |
|---|---|---|---|---|---|---|
| 1 | Elena Gigli | 19 years, 48 days | Italy | 9 July 1985 | 26 August 2004 | |
| 2 | Ilse van der Meijden | 19 years, 304 days | Netherlands | 22 October 1988 | 21 August 2008 | |
| 3 | Ashleigh Johnson | 21 years, 342 days | United States | 12 September 1994 | 19 August 2016 | |

Top 3 youngest female water polo goalkeepers, Olympic silver medalists
| Rk | Goalkeeper | Age of receiving the first Olympic silver medal | Women's team | Date of birth | Date of receiving the first Olympic silver medal | Ref |
|---|---|---|---|---|---|---|
| 1 | Anthoula Mylonaki | 20 years, 77 days | Greece | 10 June 1984 | 26 August 2004 | |
| 2 | Laura Ester | 22 years, 200 days | Spain | 22 January 1990 | 9 August 2012 | |
| 3 | Bernice Orwig | 23 years, 304 days | United States | 24 November 1976 | 23 September 2000 | |

Top 3 youngest female water polo goalkeepers, Olympic bronze medalists
| Rk | Goalkeeper | Age of receiving the first Olympic bronze medal | Women's team | Date of birth | Date of receiving the first Olympic bronze medal | Ref |
|---|---|---|---|---|---|---|
| 1 | Anna Karnaukh | 22 years, 354 days | Russia | 31 August 1993 | 19 August 2016 | |
| 2 | Jacqueline Frank | 24 years, 117 days | United States | 1 May 1980 | 26 August 2004 | |
| 3 | Galina Rytova | 25 years, 13 days | Russia | 10 September 1975 | 23 September 2000 | |

=== Multiple appearances ===
==== By tournament ====
The following table is pre-sorted by edition of the Olympics (in ascending order), name of the team (in ascending order), name of the goalkeeper (in ascending order), respectively. Last updated: 1 April 2021.

As of 2016, fifteen female goalkeepers have been named in the national water polo team squad in two or more Olympic tournaments.

Legend

- Team^{*} – Host team

| Year | Total | Four-time Olympian (GK) | | Three-time Olympian (GK) | | Two-time Olympian (GK) | |
|---|---|---|---|---|---|---|---|
| 2000 | 0 | — | 0 | — | 0 | — | 0 |
| 2004 | 3 | — | 0 | — | 0 | Kazakhstan: Svetlana Buravova-Khapsalis, Galina Rytova; United States: Nicolle Payne | 3 |
| 2008 | 5 | — | 0 | — | 0 | Australia: Emma Knox; Greece: Georgia Ellinaki; Hungary: Ildikó Sós; Italy: Elena Gigli; Russia: Valentina Vorontsova | 5 |
| 2012 | 4 | — | 0 | Italy: Elena Gigli | 1 | Australia: Alicia McCormack; China: Yang Jun; United States: Elizabeth Armstrong | 3 |
| 2016 | 5 | — | 0 | China: Yang Jun | 1 | Hungary: Edina Gangl; Italy: Giulia Gorlero; Russia: Anna Karnaukh; Spain: Laura Ester | 4 |
| 2020 | | | | | | | |
| Year | Total | Four-time Olympian (GK) | | Three-time Olympian (GK) | | Two-time Olympian (GK) | |

==== Three-time Olympians ====
The following table is pre-sorted by number of Olympic appearances (in descending order), year of the last Olympic appearance (in ascending order), year of the first Olympic appearance (in ascending order), date of birth (in ascending order), name of the goalkeeper (in ascending order), respectively. Last updated: 1 April 2021.

Two female goalkeepers have been named in the national water polo team squad in three or more Olympic tournaments between 2000 and 2016 inclusive.

Legend and abbreviation

- – Hosts
- Apps – Appearances

Female goalkeepers who have been named in the national team squad in three or more Olympic tournaments
| Apps | Goalkeeper | Birth | Height | Women's team | Water polo tournaments | | | | Period (age of first/last) | Medals | | | | Ref |
| Apps | Goalkeeper | Birth | Height | Women's team | 1 | 2 | 3 | 4 | Period (age of first/last) | G | S | B | T | Ref |
|---|---|---|---|---|---|---|---|---|---|---|---|---|---|---|
| 3 | Elena Gigli | 1985 | 1.92 m (6 ft 4 in) | Italy | 2004 | 2008 | 2012 | | 8 years (19/27) | 1 | 0 | 0 | 1 | |
| 3 | Yang Jun | 1988 | 1.80 m (5 ft 11 in) | China | 2008 | 2012 | 2016 | | 8 years (20/28) | 0 | 0 | 0 | 0 | |

=== Multiple medalists ===
The following table is pre-sorted by total number of Olympic medals (in descending order), number of Olympic gold medals (in descending order), number of Olympic silver medals (in descending order), year of receiving the last Olympic medal (in ascending order), year of receiving the first Olympic medal (in ascending order), name of the goalkeeper (in ascending order), respectively. Last updated: 1 April 2021.

As of 2016, three female goalkeepers have won two or more Olympic medals in water polo.

Legend

- – Hosts

Female goalkeepers who have won two or more Olympic medals in water polo
| Rk | Goalkeeper | Birth | Height | Women's team | Water polo tournaments | | | | Period (age of first/last) | Medals | | | | Ref |
| Rk | Goalkeeper | Birth | Height | Women's team | 1 | 2 | 3 | 4 | Period (age of first/last) | G | S | B | T | Ref |
|---|---|---|---|---|---|---|---|---|---|---|---|---|---|---|
| 1 | Elizabeth Armstrong | 1983 | 1.88 m (6 ft 2 in) | United States | 2008 | 2012 | | | 4 years (25/29) | 1 | 1 | 0 | 2 | |
| 2 | Nicolle Payne | 1976 | 1.75 m (5 ft 9 in) | United States | 2000 | 2004 | | | 4 years (24/28) | 0 | 1 | 1 | 2 | |
| 3 | Alicia McCormack | 1983 | 1.68 m (5 ft 6 in) | Australia | 2008 | 2012 | | | 4 years (25/29) | 0 | 0 | 2 | 2 | |

=== Most saves ===
==== One match ====
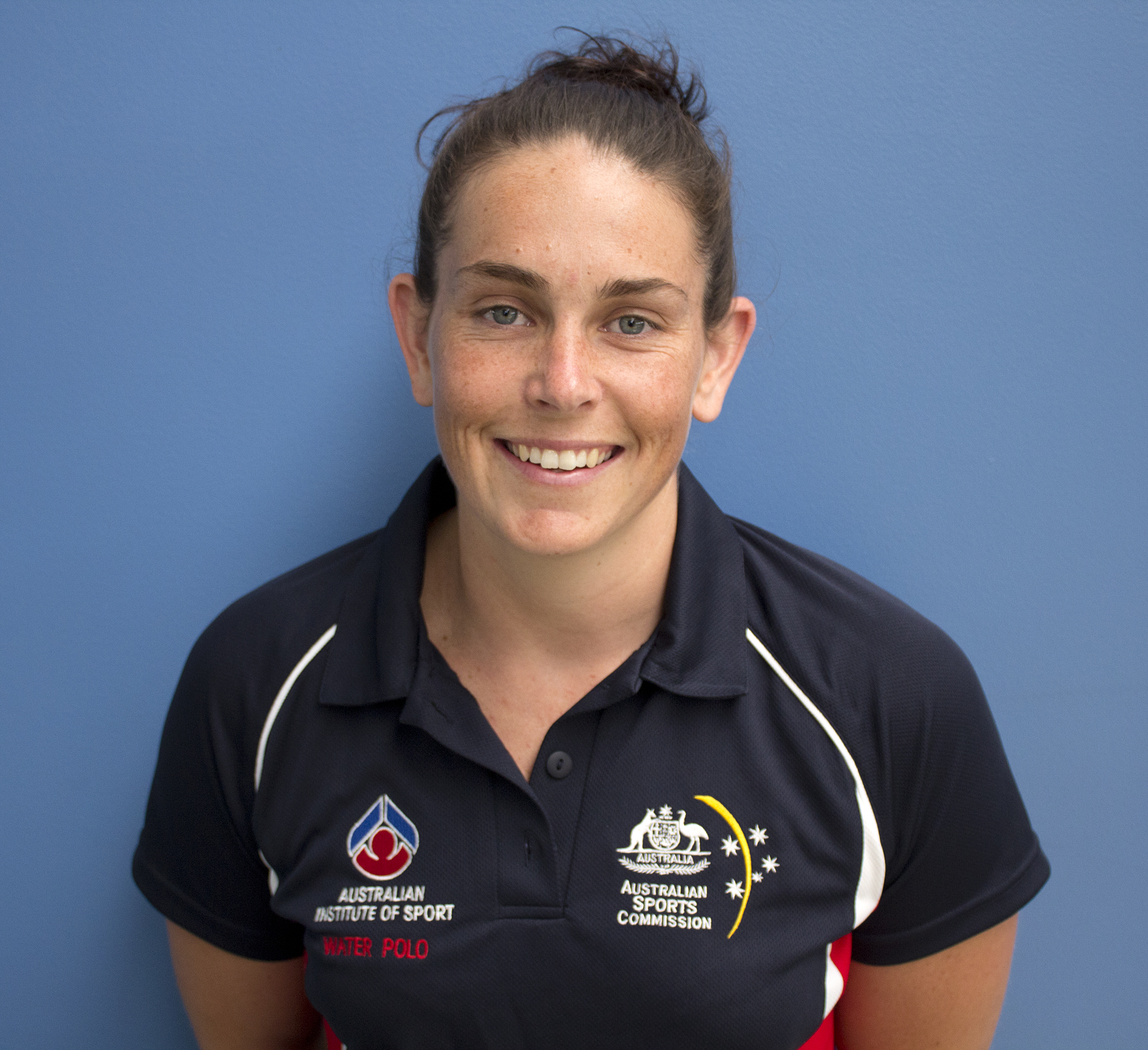
Alicia McCormack of Australia saved 15 shots in a match in 2008.

The following table is pre-sorted by date of the match (in ascending order), name of the goalkeeper (in ascending order), respectively. Last updated: 1 April 2021.

Five female water polo goalkeepers have each saved fifteen or more shots in an Olympic match.

The first woman to do so was Patrícia Horváth, with Hungary women's national team in Beijing. She blocked 19 shots on 11 August 2008, setting the record for the most shots saved by a female water polo goalkeeper in a single Olympic match.

The most recent female goalkeeper to do so was Yang Jun, with China women's national team in Rio de Janeiro on 19 August 2016.

Legend and abbreviation

- – Player's team drew the match
- – Player's team lost the match
- Team – Host team
- Player^{‡} – Player who won the tournament with her team
- aet – After extra time
- pso – Penalty shootout
- ORB – Official Results Books

Female goalkeepers with fifteen or more saves in an Olympic match
| # | Saves | Goalkeeper | Birth | Age | Height | For | Result | Against | Tournament | Round | Date | Ref |
|---|---|---|---|---|---|---|---|---|---|---|---|---|
| 1 | 19 | Patrícia Horváth | 1977 | 30 | 1.83 m (6 ft 0 in) | Hungary | 11–9 | Netherlands | Beijing 2008 | Preliminary round Group B | 11 Aug 2008 | ORB 2008 (p. 17) |
| 2 | 15 | Alicia McCormack | 1983 | 25 | 1.67 m (5 ft 6 in) | Australia | 8–9 | United States | Beijing 2008 | Semi-finals | 19 Aug 2008 | ORB 2008 (p. 35) |
| 3 | 16 | Elena Gigli | 1985 | 27 | 1.92 m (6 ft 4 in) | Italy | 4–7 | Russia | London 2012 | Preliminary round Group B | 1 Aug 2012 | ORB 2012 (p. 302) |
| 4 | 15 | Tess Oliveira | 1987 | 29 | 1.65 m (5 ft 5 in) | Brazil | 4–11 | Australia | Rio 2016 | Classification round 5th–8th place | 17 Aug 2016 | ORB 2016 (p. 170) |
| 5 | 16 | Yang Jun | 1988 | 28 | 1.80 m (5 ft 11 in) | China | 10–5 | Brazil | Rio 2016 | 7th–8th place match | 19 Aug 2016 | ORB 2016 (p. 178) |

The following table shows the historical progression of the record of shots saved by a female water polo goalkeeper in a single Olympic match. Last updated: 1 April 2021.

Legend

- Team – Host team
- Player^{‡} – Player who won the tournament with her team
- ORB – Official Results Books

Historical progression of records: Most shots saved by a female goalkeeper, one match
| Saves | Achievement | Year | Goalkeeper | Age | Height | Women's team | Date | Duration of record | Ref |
|---|---|---|---|---|---|---|---|---|---|
| 12 | Set record | 2000 | Bernice Orwig | 23 | 1.82 m (6 ft 0 in) | United States | 18 September 2000 | 3 years, 337 days | ORB 2000 (p. 114) |
| 14 | Broke record | 2004 | Jacqueline Frank | 24 | 1.80 m (5 ft 11 in) | United States | 20 August 2004 | 3 years, 357 days | ORB 2004 (p. 24) |
| 19 | Broke record | 2008 | Patrícia Horváth | 30 | 1.83 m (6 ft 0 in) | Hungary | 11 August 2008 | 17 years, 201 days | ORB 2008 (p. 17) |

==== One tournament ====
The following table is pre-sorted by number of saves (in descending order), edition of the Olympics (in ascending order), number of matches played (in ascending order), name of the goalkeeper (in ascending order), respectively. Last updated: 1 April 2021.

Six female goalkeepers have saved 50 or more shots in an Olympic water polo tournament.

Giulia Gorlero of Italy holds the record for the most saves by a female water polo goalkeeper in a single Olympic tournament, blocking 65 shots in the 2016 edition.

At the 2016 Summer Games, Ashleigh Johnson saved 51 shots, including nine in the gold medal match, helping the American team win the Olympics. She is the most efficient one among these six goalkeepers.

Legend and abbreviation

- Team – Host team
- Player^{‡} – Player who won the tournament with her team
- MP – Matches played
- Eff % – Save efficiency (Saves / Shots)
- 64.6% – Highest save efficiency

Female goalkeepers with 50 or more saves in an Olympic tournament
| Rk | Year | Goalkeeper | Birth | Age | Height | Saves | Shots | Eff % | MP | Saves per match | Women's team | Finish | Ref |
|---|---|---|---|---|---|---|---|---|---|---|---|---|---|
| 1 | 2016 | Giulia Gorlero | 1990 | 25 | 1.80 m (5 ft 11 in) | 65 | 106 | 61.3% | 6 | 10.833 | Italy | 2nd of 8 teams | |
| 2 | 2012 | Elena Gigli | 1985 | 27 | 1.92 m (6 ft 4 in) | 56 | 105 | 53.3% | 6 | 9.333 | Italy | 7th of 8 teams | |
| 3 | 2016 | Yang Jun | 1988 | 28 | 1.80 m (5 ft 11 in) | 55 | 118 | 46.6% | 6 | 9.167 | China | 7th of 8 teams | |
| 4 | 2012 | Rosemary Morris | 1986 | 26 | 1.80 m (5 ft 11 in) | 54 | 113 | 47.8% | 6 | 9.000 | Great Britain | 8th of 8 teams | |
| 5 | 2012 | Elizabeth Armstrong^{‡} | 1983 | 29 | 1.92 m (6 ft 4 in) | 53 | 101 | 52.5% | 6 | 8.833 | United States | 1st of 8 teams | |
| 6 | 2016 | Ashleigh Johnson^{‡} | 1994 | 21 | 1.86 m (6 ft 1 in) | 51 | 79 | 64.6% | 6 | 8.500 | United States | 1st of 8 teams | |

- Official Results Books (PDF): 2000 (pp. 96–101), 2004 (p. 49), 2008 (p. 50), 2012 (p. 341), 2016 (p. 195).

The following table is pre-sorted by edition of the Olympics (in ascending order), number of matches played (in ascending order), name of the goalkeeper (in ascending order), respectively. Last updated: 1 April 2021.

At the 2004 Summer Games, Jacqueline Frank saved 41 shots, including seven in the bronze medal match, helping the United States win the match.

Giulia Gorlero of Italy blocked 65 shots at the 2016 Olympics, helping the Italian team win the Olympic silver medal.

Legend and abbreviation

- Team – Host team
- Player^{‡} – Player who won the tournament with her team
- MP – Matches played
- Eff % – Save efficiency (Saves / Shots)

Female goalkeepers with the most saves in each Olympic tournament
| Year | Goalkeeper | Birth | Age | Height | Saves | Shots | Eff % | MP | Saves per match | Women's team | Finish | Ref |
|---|---|---|---|---|---|---|---|---|---|---|---|---|
| 2000 | Karla Plugge | 1968 | 31 | 1.81 m (5 ft 11 in) | 45 | 81 | 55.6% | 7 | 6.429 | Netherlands | 4th of 6 teams | |
| 2004 | Jacqueline Frank | 1980 | 24 | 1.80 m (5 ft 11 in) | 41 | 68 | 60.3% | 5 | 8.200 | United States | 3rd of 8 teams | |
| 2008 | Elizabeth Armstrong | 1983 | 25 | 1.88 m (6 ft 2 in) | 49 | 92 | 53.3% | 5 | 9.800 | United States | 2nd of 8 teams | |
| 2012 | Elena Gigli | 1985 | 27 | 1.92 m (6 ft 4 in) | 56 | 105 | 53.3% | 6 | 9.333 | Italy | 7th of 8 teams | |
| 2016 | Giulia Gorlero | 1990 | 25 | 1.80 m (5 ft 11 in) | 65 | 106 | 61.3% | 6 | 10.833 | Italy | 2nd of 8 teams | |

- Official Results Books (PDF): 2000 (pp. 96–101), 2004 (p. 49), 2008 (p. 50), 2012 (p. 341), 2016 (p. 195).

The following table shows the historical progression of the record of shots saved by a female water polo goalkeeper in a single Olympic tournament. Last updated: 1 April 2021.

Legend

- Team – Host team
- Player^{‡} – Player who won the tournament with her team

Historical progression of records: Most shots saved by a female goalkeeper, one tournament
| Saves | Achievement | Year | Goalkeeper | Age | Height | Women's team | Date | Duration of record | Ref |
|---|---|---|---|---|---|---|---|---|---|
| 45 | Set record | 2000 | Karla Plugge | 31 | 1.81 m (5 ft 11 in) | Netherlands | 23 September 2000 | 7 years, 333 days | |
| 49 | Broke record | 2008 | Elizabeth Armstrong | 25 | 1.88 m (6 ft 2 in) | United States | 21 August 2008 | 3 years, 354 days | |
| 56 | Broke record | 2012 | Elena Gigli | 27 | 1.92 m (6 ft 4 in) | Italy | 9 August 2012 | 4 years, 10 days | |
| 65 | Broke record | 2016 | Giulia Gorlero | 25 | 1.80 m (5 ft 11 in) | Italy | 19 August 2016 | 9 years, 193 days | |

==== All-time ====
The following table is pre-sorted by number of total saves (in descending order), number of total Olympic matches played (in ascending order), date of the last Olympic match played (in ascending order), date of the first Olympic match played (in ascending order), name of the goalkeeper (in ascending order), respectively. Last updated: 1 April 2021.

Yang Jun of China holds the record for the most shots saved by a female water polo goalkeeper at the Olympics, with 138 saves at three Olympics (2008–2016).

Elizabeth Armstrong, representing the United States, blocked 102 shots at two Olympics (2008–2012).

Legend

- – Hosts

All-time female goalkeepers with 100 or more saves at the Olympics
| Rk | Goalkeeper | Birth | Height | Women's team | Total saves | Total matches played | Saves per match | Tournaments (saves) | | | Period (age of first/last) | Medals | | | | Ref |
| Rk | Goalkeeper | Birth | Height | Women's team | Total saves | Total matches played | Saves per match | 1 | 2 | 3 | Period (age of first/last) | G | S | B | T | Ref |
|---|---|---|---|---|---|---|---|---|---|---|---|---|---|---|---|---|
| 1 | Yang Jun | 1988 | 1.80 m (5 ft 11 in) | China | 138 | 17 | 8.118 | 2008 (39) | 2012 (44) | 2016 (55) | 8 years (20/28) | 0 | 0 | 0 | 0 | |
| 2 | Elizabeth Armstrong | 1983 | 1.88 m (6 ft 2 in) | United States | 102 | 11 | 9.273 | 2008 (49) | 2012 (53) | | 4 years (25/29) | 1 | 1 | 0 | 2 | |

- Official Results Books (PDF): 2000 (pp. 96–101), 2004 (p. 49), 2008 (p. 50), 2012 (p. 341), 2016 (p. 195).

The following table shows the historical progression of the record of total shots saved by a female water polo goalkeeper at the Summer Olympics. Last updated: 1 April 2021.

Legend

- Team – Host team
- Player^{‡} – Player who won the tournament with her team

Historical progression of records: Most shots saved by a female goalkeeper, all-time
| Total saves | Achievement | Year | Goalkeeper | Age | Height | Women's team | Date | Duration of record | Ref |
|---|---|---|---|---|---|---|---|---|---|
| 53 | Set record | 2008 | Georgia Ellinaki | 34 | 1.74 m (5 ft 9 in) | Greece | 21 August 2008 | 3 years, 354 days | |
| 102 | Broke record | 2012 | Elizabeth Armstrong^{‡} | 29 | 1.88 m (6 ft 2 in) | United States | 9 August 2012 | 4 years, 10 days | |
| 138 | Broke record | 2016 | Yang Jun | 28 | 1.80 m (5 ft 11 in) | China | 19 August 2016 | 9 years, 193 days | |

== Goalkeepers by team ==
The following tables are pre-sorted by edition of the Olympics (in ascending order), cap number or name of the goalkeeper (in ascending order), respectively.

Legend

- Year^{*} – As host team

=== Australia ===
- Women's national team: Australia
- Team appearances: 5 (2000^{*}–2016)
- As host team: 2000^{*}
- Last updated: 1 April 2021.

Legend and abbreviation

- – Hosts
- Eff % – Save efficiency (Saves / Shots)

| Year | Cap No. | Goalkeeper | Birth | Age | Saves | Shots | Eff % | ISHOF member | Note | Ref |
|---|---|---|---|---|---|---|---|---|---|---|
| 2000 | 1 | Liz Weekes | 1971 | 29 | 21 | 46 | 45.7% | | Starting goalkeeper | |
| 2000 | 7 | Danielle Woodhouse | 1969 | 31 | 11 | 15 | 73.3% | | | |
| 2004 | 1 | Emma Knox | 1978 | 26 | 12 | 26 | 42.9% | | | |
| 2004 | 11 | Jemma Brownlow | 1979 | 24 | 19 | 31 | 61.3% | | | |
| 2008 | 1 | Emma Knox (2) | 1978 | 30 | 16 | 42 | 38.1% | | | |
| 2008 | 13 | Alicia McCormack | 1983 | 25 | 32 | 59 | 54.2% | | | |
| 2012 | 1 | Victoria Brown | 1985 | 27 | 4 | 8 | 50.0% | | | |
| 2012 | 13 | Alicia McCormack (2) | 1983 | 29 | 40 | 93 | 43.0% | | Starting goalkeeper | |
| 2016 | 1 | Lea Yanitsas | 1989 | 27 | 27 | 46 | 58.7% | | | |
| 2016 | 13 | Kelsey Wakefield | 1991 | 25 | 18 | 38 | 47.4% | | | |
| Year | Cap No. | Goalkeeper | Birth | Age | Saves | Shots | Eff % | ISHOF member | Note | Ref |

- Official Results Books (PDF): 2000 (p. 96), 2004 (pp. 56–57), 2008 (pp. 56–57), 2012 (pp. 347–348), 2016 (pp. 197–198).

=== Brazil ===
- Women's national team: Brazil
- Team appearances: 1 (2016^{*})
- As host team: 2016^{*}
- Last updated: 1 April 2021.

Legend and abbreviation

- – Hosts
- Eff % – Save efficiency (Saves / Shots)

| Year | Cap No. | Goalkeeper | Birth | Age | Saves | Shots | Eff % | ISHOF member | Note | Ref |
|---|---|---|---|---|---|---|---|---|---|---|
| 2016 | 1 | Tess Oliveira | 1987 | 29 | 34 | 69 | 49.3% | | | |
| 2016 | 13 | Victória Chamorro | 1996 | 20 | 23 | 55 | 41.8% | | | |

- Official Results Books (PDF): 2016 (pp. 200–201).

=== Canada ===
- Women's national team: Canada
- Team appearances: 2 (2000–2004)
- As host team: —
- Last updated: 1 April 2021.

Abbreviation

- Eff % – Save efficiency (Saves / Shots)

| Year | Cap No. | Goalkeeper | Birth | Age | Saves | Shots | Eff % | ISHOF member | Note | Ref |
|---|---|---|---|---|---|---|---|---|---|---|
| 2000 | 1 | Josée Marsolais | 1973 | 26 | 37 | 66 | 56.1% | | Starting goalkeeper | |
| 2000 | 5 | Isabelle Auger | 1969 | 31 | 8 | 21 | 38.1% | | | |
| 2004 | 1 | Whynter Lamarre | 1979 | 25 | 8 | 21 | 38.1% | | | |
| 2004 | 2 | Rachel Riddell | 1984 | 19 | 14 | 23 | 60.9% | | | |
| Year | Cap No. | Goalkeeper | Birth | Age | Saves | Shots | Eff % | ISHOF member | Note | Ref |

- Official Results Books (PDF): 2000 (p. 97), 2004 (pp. 60–61).

=== China ===
- Women's national team: China
- Team appearances: 3 (2008^{*}–2016)
- As host team: 2008^{*}
- Last updated: 1 April 2021.

Legend and abbreviation

- – Hosts
- Eff % – Save efficiency (Saves / Shots)

| Year | Cap No. | Goalkeeper | Birth | Age | Saves | Shots | Eff % | ISHOF member | Note | Ref |
|---|---|---|---|---|---|---|---|---|---|---|
| 2008 | 1 | Yang Jun | 1988 | 20 | 39 | 89 | 43.8% | | Starting goalkeeper | |
| 2008 | 13 | Tan Ying | 1987 | 21 | 0 | 2 | 0.0% | | | |
| 2012 | 1 | Yang Jun (2) | 1988 | 24 | 44 | 106 | 41.5% | | Starting goalkeeper | |
| 2012 | 13 | Wang Ying | 1988 | 24 | 17 | 25 | 68.0% | | | |
| 2016 | 1 | Yang Jun (3) | 1988 | 28 | 55 | 118 | 46.6% | | Starting goalkeeper | |
| 2016 | 13 | Peng Lin | 1995 | 21 | 0 | 2 | 0.0% | | | |
| Year | Cap No. | Goalkeeper | Birth | Age | Saves | Shots | Eff % | ISHOF member | Note | Ref |

- Official Results Books (PDF): 2008 (pp. 59–60), 2012 (pp. 350–351), 2016 (pp. 203–204).

=== Great Britain ===
- Women's national team: Great Britain
- Team appearances: 1 (2012^{*})
- As host team: 2012^{*}
- Last updated: 1 April 2021.

Legend and abbreviation

- – Hosts
- Eff % – Save efficiency (Saves / Shots)

| Year | Cap No. | Goalkeeper | Birth | Age | Saves | Shots | Eff % | ISHOF member | Note | Ref |
|---|---|---|---|---|---|---|---|---|---|---|
| 2012 | 1 | Robyn Nicholls | 1990 | 22 | 0 | 5 | 0.0% | | | |
| 2012 | 13 | Rosemary Morris | 1986 | 26 | 54 | 113 | 47.8% | | Starting goalkeeper | |

- Official Results Books (PDF): 2012 (pp. 356–357).

=== Greece ===
- Women's national team: Greece
- Team appearances: 2 (2004^{*}–2008)
- As host team: 2004^{*}
- Last updated: 1 April 2021.

Legend and abbreviation

- – Hosts
- Eff % – Save efficiency (Saves / Shots)

| Year | Cap No. | Goalkeeper | Birth | Age | Saves | Shots | Eff % | ISHOF member | Note | Ref |
|---|---|---|---|---|---|---|---|---|---|---|
| 2004 | 1 | Georgia Ellinaki | 1974 | 30 | 40 | 73 | 54.8% | | Starting goalkeeper | |
| 2004 | 13 | Anthoula Mylonaki | 1984 | 20 | 5 | 8 | 62.5% | | | |
| 2008 | 1 | Georgia Ellinaki (2) | 1974 | 34 | 13 | 28 | 46.4% | | | |
| 2008 | 13 | Maria Tsouri | 1986 | 22 | 33 | 57 | 57.9% | | | |
| Year | Cap No. | Goalkeeper | Birth | Age | Saves | Shots | Eff % | ISHOF member | Note | Ref |

- Official Results Books (PDF): 2004 (pp. 64–65), 2008 (pp. 62–63).

=== Hungary ===
- Women's national team: Hungary
- Team appearances: 4 (2004–2016)
- As host team: —
- Last updated: 1 April 2021.

Abbreviation

- Eff % – Save efficiency (Saves / Shots)

| Year | Cap No. | Goalkeeper | Birth | Age | Saves | Shots | Eff % | ISHOF member | Note | Ref |
|---|---|---|---|---|---|---|---|---|---|---|
| 2004 | 1 | Ildikó Sós | 1976 | 27 | 25 | 56 | 44.6% | | Starting goalkeeper | |
| 2004 | 13 | Andrea Tóth | 1981 | 23 | 10 | 19 | 52.6% | | | |
| 2008 | 1 | Patrícia Horváth | 1977 | 30 | 43 | 77 | 55.8% | | Starting goalkeeper | |
| 2008 | 13 | Ildikó Sós (2) | 1976 | 31 | 12 | 18 | 66.7% | | | |
| 2012 | 1 | Flóra Bolonyai | 1991 | 21 | 17 | 65 | 26.2% | | | |
| 2012 | 13 | Edina Gangl | 1990 | 22 | 25 | 47 | 53.2% | | | |
| 2016 | 1 | Edina Gangl (2) | 1990 | 26 | 15 | 45 | 33.3% | | | |
| 2016 | 13 | Orsolya Kasó | 1988 | 27 | 27 | 64 | 42.2% | | | |
| Year | Cap No. | Goalkeeper | Birth | Age | Saves | Shots | Eff % | ISHOF member | Note | Ref |

- Official Results Books (PDF): 2004 (pp. 68–69), 2008 (pp. 65–66), 2012 (pp. 359–360), 2016 (pp. 209–210).

=== Italy ===
- Women's national team: Italy
- Team appearances: 4 (2004–2016)
- As host team: —
- Last updated: 1 April 2021.

Abbreviation

- Eff % – Save efficiency (Saves / Shots)

| Year | Cap No. | Goalkeeper | Birth | Age | Saves | Shots | Eff % | ISHOF member | Note | Ref |
|---|---|---|---|---|---|---|---|---|---|---|
| 2004 | 1 | Francesca Conti | 1972 | 32 | 39 | 72 | 54.2% | | Starting goalkeeper | |
| 2004 | 5 | Elena Gigli | 1985 | 19 | 0 | 0 | — | | | |
| 2008 | 1 | Elena Gigli (2) | 1985 | 23 | 40 | 79 | 50.6% | | Starting goalkeeper | |
| 2008 | 13 | Chiara Brancati | 1981 | 27 | 10 | 20 | 50.0% | | | |
| 2012 | 1 | Elena Gigli (3) | 1985 | 27 | 56 | 105 | 53.3% | | Starting goalkeeper | |
| 2012 | 13 | Giulia Gorlero | 1990 | 21 | 3 | 6 | 50.0% | | | |
| 2016 | 1 | Giulia Gorlero (2) | 1990 | 25 | 65 | 106 | 61.3% | | Starting goalkeeper | |
| 2016 | 13 | Laura Teani | 1991 | 25 | 0 | 2 | 0.0% | | | |
| Year | Cap No. | Goalkeeper | Birth | Age | Saves | Shots | Eff % | ISHOF member | Note | Ref |

- Official Results Books (PDF): 2004 (pp. 72–73), 2008 (pp. 68–69), 2012 (pp. 362–363), 2016 (pp. 212–213).

=== Kazakhstan ===
- Women's national team: Kazakhstan
- Team appearances: 2 (2000–2004)
- As host team: —
- Last updated: 1 April 2021.

Abbreviation

- Eff % – Save efficiency (Saves / Shots)

| Year | Cap No. | Goalkeeper | Birth | Age | Saves | Shots | Eff % | ISHOF member | Note | Ref |
|---|---|---|---|---|---|---|---|---|---|---|
| 2000 | 1 | Svetlana Buravova-Khapsalis | 1973 | 27 | 38 | 88 | 43.2% | | Starting goalkeeper | |
| 2000 | 3 | Irina Borodavko | 1979 | 20 | 2 | 12 | 16.7% | | | |
| 2004 | 1 | Galina Rytova (2) | 1975 | 28 | 31 | 66 | 47.0% | | Starting goalkeeper | |
| 2004 | 4 | Svetlana Buravova-Khapsalis (2) | 1973 | 31 | 0 | 0 | — | | | |
| Year | Cap No. | Goalkeeper | Birth | Age | Saves | Shots | Eff % | ISHOF member | Note | Ref |

- Official Results Books (PDF): 2000 (p. 98), 2004 (pp. 76–77).

Note:

- Galina Rytova is also listed in section Russia.

=== Netherlands ===
- Women's national team: Netherlands
- Team appearances: 2 (2000, 2008)
- As host team: —
- Last updated: 1 April 2021.

Abbreviation

- Eff % – Save efficiency (Saves / Shots)

| Year | Cap No. | Goalkeeper | Birth | Age | Saves | Shots | Eff % | ISHOF member | Note | Ref |
|---|---|---|---|---|---|---|---|---|---|---|
| 2000 | 1 | Karla Plugge | 1968 | 31 | 45 | 81 | 55.6% | | Starting goalkeeper | |
| 2000 | 6 | Hellen Boering | 1964 | 36 | 0 | 0 | — | | | |
| 2008 | 1 | Ilse van der Meijden | 1988 | 19 | 45 | 98 | 45.9% | | Starting goalkeeper | |
| 2008 | 13 | Meike de Nooy | 1983 | 25 | 0 | 0 | — | | | |
| Year | Cap No. | Goalkeeper | Birth | Age | Saves | Shots | Eff % | ISHOF member | Note | Ref |

- Official Results Books (PDF): 2000 (p. 99), 2008 (pp. 71–72).

=== Russia ===
- Women's national team: Russia
- Team appearances: 5 (2000–2016)
- As host team: —
- Last updated: 1 April 2021.

Abbreviation

- Eff % – Save efficiency (Saves / Shots)

| Year | Cap No. | Goalkeeper | Birth | Age | Saves | Shots | Eff % | ISHOF member | Note | Ref |
|---|---|---|---|---|---|---|---|---|---|---|
| 2000 | 1 | Marina Akobiya | 1975 | 25 | 43 | 76 | 56.6% | | Starting goalkeeper | |
| 2000 | 2 | Galina Rytova | 1975 | 25 | 5 | 11 | 45.5% | | | |
| 2004 | 1 | Valentina Vorontsova | 1982 | 22 | 23 | 60 | 38.3% | | Starting goalkeeper | |
| 2004 | 6 | Galina Zlotnikova | 1984 | 20 | 3 | 6 | 50.0% | | | |
| 2008 | 1 | Valentina Vorontsova (2) | 1982 | 26 | 13 | 37 | 35.1% | | | |
| 2008 | 13 | Yevgeniya Protsenko | 1983 | 24 | 13 | 29 | 44.8% | | | |
| 2012 | 1 | Maria Kovtunovskaya | 1988 | 23 | 29 | 55 | 52.7% | | | |
| 2012 | 13 | Anna Karnaukh | 1993 | 18 | 22 | 53 | 41.5% | | | |
| 2016 | 1 | Anna Ustyukhina | 1989 | 27 | 10 | 35 | 28.6% | | | |
| 2016 | 13 | Anna Karnaukh (2) | 1993 | 22 | 27 | 67 | 40.3% | | | |
| Year | Cap No. | Goalkeeper | Birth | Age | Saves | Shots | Eff % | ISHOF member | Note | Ref |

- Official Results Books (PDF): 2000 (p. 100), 2004 (pp. 80–81), 2008 (pp. 74–75), 2012 (pp. 365–366), 2016 (pp. 215–216).

Note:

- Galina Rytova is also listed in section Kazakhstan.

=== Spain ===
- Women's national team: Spain
- Team appearances: 2 (2012–2016)
- As host team: —
- Last updated: 1 April 2021.

Abbreviation

- Eff % – Save efficiency (Saves / Shots)

| Year | Cap No. | Goalkeeper | Birth | Age | Saves | Shots | Eff % | ISHOF member | Note | Ref |
|---|---|---|---|---|---|---|---|---|---|---|
| 2012 | 1 | Laura Ester | 1990 | 22 | 36 | 86 | 41.9% | | Starting goalkeeper | |
| 2012 | 13 | Ana Copado | 1980 | 32 | 0 | 0 | — | | | |
| 2016 | 1 | Laura Ester (2) | 1990 | 26 | 41 | 94 | 43.6% | | Starting goalkeeper | |
| 2016 | 13 | Patricia Herrera | 1993 | 23 | 1 | 5 | 20.0% | | | |
| Year | Cap No. | Goalkeeper | Birth | Age | Saves | Shots | Eff % | ISHOF member | Note | Ref |

- Official Results Books (PDF): 2012 (pp. 353–354), 2016 (pp. 206–207).

=== United States ===
- Women's national team: United States
- Team appearances: 5 (2000–2016)
- As host team: —
- Last updated: 1 April 2021.

Legend and abbreviation

- – Hosts
- Eff % – Save efficiency (Saves / Shots)

| Year | Cap No. | Goalkeeper | Birth | Age | Saves | Shots | Eff % | ISHOF member | Note | Ref |
|---|---|---|---|---|---|---|---|---|---|---|
| 2000 | 1 | Bernice Orwig | 1976 | 23 | 39 | 59 | 66.1% | | | |
| 2000 | 11 | Nicolle Payne | 1976 | 24 | 19 | 38 | 50.0% | | | |
| 2004 | 1 | Jacqueline Frank | 1980 | 24 | 41 | 68 | 60.3% | | Starting goalkeeper | |
| 2004 | 12 | Nicolle Payne (2) | 1976 | 28 | 0 | 0 | — | | | |
| 2008 | 1 | Elizabeth Armstrong | 1983 | 25 | 49 | 92 | 53.3% | | Starting goalkeeper | |
| 2008 | 13 | Jaime Komer | 1981 | 26 | 1 | 2 | 50.0% | | | |
| 2012 | 1 | Elizabeth Armstrong (2) | 1983 | 29 | 53 | 101 | 52.5% | | Starting goalkeeper | |
| 2012 | 13 | Tumua Anae | 1988 | 23 | 0 | 0 | — | | | |
| 2016 | 1 | Samantha Hill | 1992 | 24 | 6 | 10 | 60.0% | | | |
| 2016 | 13 | Ashleigh Johnson | 1994 | 21 | 51 | 79 | 64.6% | | Starting goalkeeper | |
| Year | Cap No. | Goalkeeper | Birth | Age | Saves | Shots | Eff % | ISHOF member | Note | Ref |

- Official Results Books (PDF): 2000 (p. 101), 2004 (pp. 84–85), 2008 (pp. 77–78), 2012 (pp. 368–369), 2016 (pp. 218–219).

== See also ==
- Water polo at the Summer Olympics
- Lists of Olympic water polo records and statistics
  - List of men's Olympic water polo tournament records and statistics
  - List of women's Olympic water polo tournament records and statistics
  - List of Olympic champions in men's water polo
  - List of Olympic champions in women's water polo
  - National team appearances in the men's Olympic water polo tournament
  - National team appearances in the women's Olympic water polo tournament
  - List of players who have appeared in multiple men's Olympic water polo tournaments
  - List of players who have appeared in multiple women's Olympic water polo tournaments
  - List of Olympic medalists in water polo (men)
  - List of Olympic medalists in water polo (women)
  - List of men's Olympic water polo tournament top goalscorers
  - List of women's Olympic water polo tournament top goalscorers
  - List of men's Olympic water polo tournament goalkeepers
  - List of Olympic venues in water polo

== Sources ==
=== Official Results Books (IOC) ===
PDF documents in the LA84 Foundation Digital Library:

- Official Results Book – 2000 Olympic Games – Water Polo (download, archive)
- Official Results Book – 2004 Olympic Games – Water Polo (download, archive)
- Official Results Book – 2008 Olympic Games – Water Polo (download, archive)

PDF documents on the FINA website:

- Official Results Book – 2012 Olympic Games – Diving, Swimming, Synchronised Swimming, Water Polo (archive) (pp. 284–507)

PDF documents in the Olympic World Library:

- Official Results Book – 2016 Olympic Games – Water Polo (archive)

PDF documents on the International Olympic Committee website:

- Official Results Book – 2020 Olympic Games – Water Polo (archive)
- Official Results Book – 2024 Olympic Games – Water Polo

=== Official Reports (FINA) ===
PDF documents on the FINA website:

- HistoFINA – Water polo medalists and statistics (as of September 2019) (archive) (p. 56)
- 1870–2020 | 150 years of Water Polo – Evolution of its rules (archive)

=== Official website (IOC) ===
Water polo on the International Olympic Committee website:

- Water polo
- Women's water polo

=== Olympedia ===
Water polo on the Olympedia website:

- Water polo
- Women's water polo
- Athlete count for water polo
- Water polo venues
- Water polo at the 2000 Summer Olympics (women's tournament)
- Water polo at the 2004 Summer Olympics (women's tournament)
- Water polo at the 2008 Summer Olympics (women's tournament)
- Water polo at the 2012 Summer Olympics (women's tournament)
- Water polo at the 2016 Summer Olympics (women's tournament)
- Water polo at the 2020 Summer Olympics (women's tournament)

=== Sports Reference ===
Water polo on the Sports Reference website:

- Country Medal Leaders & Athlete Medal Leaders (1900–2016) (archived)
- Women's water polo (2000–2016) (archived)
- Water polo at the 2000 Summer Games (women's tournament) (archived)
- Water polo at the 2004 Summer Games (women's tournament) (archived)
- Water polo at the 2008 Summer Games (women's tournament) (archived)
- Water polo at the 2012 Summer Games (women's tournament) (archived)
- Water polo at the 2016 Summer Games (women's tournament) (archived)

=== Todor66 ===
Water polo on the Todor66 website:

- Water polo at the Summer Games
- Water polo at the 2000 Summer Olympics (women's tournament, women's qualification)
- Water polo at the 2004 Summer Olympics (women's tournament, women's qualification)
- Water polo at the 2008 Summer Olympics (women's tournament, women's qualification)
- Water polo at the 2012 Summer Olympics (women's tournament, women's qualification)
- Water polo at the 2016 Summer Olympics (women's tournament, women's qualification)
- Water polo at the 2020 Summer Olympics (women's tournament, women's qualification)

=== ISHOF ===
International Swimming Hall of Fame (ISHOF) website:

- Honorees Listed by Category – Water Polo
- Honorees Listed by Category – Coaches
- Honorees Listed by Category – Contributors
- Honorees by Country
- Honorees By Last Name
