= Victória Chamorro =

Brazilian water polo player

Victória Chamorro Reibel
Personal information
- Nickname: Vic
- Born: 10 July 1996 (age 29) Rio de Janeiro, Brazil
- Height: 175 cm (5 ft 9 in)
- Weight: 75 kg (165 lb)

Sport
- Sport: water polo
Medal record
Representing Brazil
Pan American Games
Bronze medal – third place	2015 Toronto	Team
Bronze medal – third place	2019 Lima	Team
- Updated on 19 August 2015

Victória Chamorro Reibel (born 10 July 1996 as Victoria Guapiassu Lobo Chamorro) is a female water polo goalkeeper of Brazil.

She was part of the Brazilian team at the water polo world championships 2013 in Barcelona, 2015 in Kazan and 2019 in Budapest. She has over 100 caps for Brazil. Chamorro won two bronze medals in the Panamerican Games 2015 in Toronto and 2019 in Lima. She participated at the 2016 Summer Olympics. She played for University of Southern California from 2014 to 2018. She made her Bachelor in social sciences and economics. Since 2019 she plays in Germany. She played for Spandau 04 and SV Bayer Uerdingen. She is married with the former German waterpolo nationalteam player Ben Reibel.

== See also ==
- List of women's Olympic water polo tournament goalkeepers
