= Angeliki Gerolymou =

Greek water polo player

Personal information
- Born: 22 June 1982 (age 44) Patras, Greece
Medal record
Women's water polo
Representing Greece
World Championship
Gold medal – first place	2011 Shanghai	Team
European Championship
Silver medal – second place	2010 Zagreb	Team
Silver medal – second place	2012 Eindhoven	Team

Angeliki Gerolymou (Greek: Αγγελική Γερόλυμου, born 22 June 1982) is a retired Greek water polo player, World Champion in 2011 in Shanghai with Greece women's national water polo team. She is the current assistant coach of Greece women's national water polo team under coach Athanasios Kechagias.

She was part of the Greek squad that competed in the 2008 Olympic Games in Beijing (8th place).

At the 2010 Women's European Water Polo Championship in Zagreb Croatia, she was part of the Greek team that won the silver medal.

At the water polo championship at the 2011 World Aquatics championships in Shanghai, China she was part of the Greek team that won the gold medal (World Champions).

At the 2012 Women's European Water Polo Championship in Eindhoven Netherlands, she won the silver medal with the Greek team.

== See also ==
- List of world champions in women's water polo
- List of World Aquatics Championships medalists in water polo
