= Tumua Anae =

American water polo player (born 1988)

Personal information
- Born: Tumuaialli Anae; October 16, 1988 (age 37) Honolulu, Hawaii, U.S.
- Height: 5 ft 11 in (180 cm)
- Weight: 150 lb (70 kg)

Sport
- Country: United States
- Sport: Water Polo
- Coached by: Adam Krikorian
Medal record
Women's water polo
Representing the United States
Olympic Games
Gold medal – first place	2012 London	Team competition
Pan American Games
Gold medal – first place	2011 Guadalajara	Team competition
- Updated on August 12, 2012

Tumuaialii "Tumua" Anae (born October 16, 1988) is an American water polo goalkeeper. She was an NCAA champion and All-American while playing for the University of Southern California. She also won a gold medal at the 2012 Summer Olympics with the United States national team.

== Career ==
=== High school ===
Anae played on the water polo team at Corona del Mar High School. She was named the CIF Division II Co-Player of the Year in her senior year.

=== College ===
Anae started her college career at the University of Southern California in 2007. That season, she had 89 saves and allowed 67 goals.

The following year, Anae had 232 saves and allowed 120 goals. Her 4.6 goals against per game was the best in the MPSF. She was named to the All-American first team, the All-MPSF first team, and the NCAA All-Tournament team.

Anae was injured early in the 2009 season. She returned to make 123 saves in 12 appearances. In a match against Arizona State, she set the USC single-game saves record with 20. She was again named to the All-American first team, the All-MPSF first team, and the NCAA All-Tournament team.

In 2010, Anae was a first team All-American for the third straight year. She had 270 saves to set the single-season record at USC, and she helped the team win the NCAA championship. She was also named the MPSF Player of the Year. Anae ended her career at USC with 714 saves, the most in school history.

=== International ===
Anae joined the U.S. national water polo team in 2010. She was a backup goalie during the Americans' gold medal runs in the 2011 FINA World League Super Final and 2011 Pan American Games. She won the gold medal with the U.S. at the 2012 Summer Olympics.

== Personal ==
Anae was born in Honolulu, Hawaii, on October 16, 1988, and resides in Newport Beach, California. Her sister, Jordan, also played for the USC water polo team.

== See also ==
- United States women's Olympic water polo team records and statistics
- List of Olympic champions in women's water polo
- List of Olympic medalists in water polo (women)
- List of women's Olympic water polo tournament goalkeepers
