= Irina Borodavko =

Kazakhstani water polo player

Personal information
- Nationality: Kazakhstani
- Born: 4 November 1979 (age 46) Alma-Ata, Kazakh SSR, Soviet Union

Sport
- Sport: Water polo

Irina Borodavko (Ирина Александровна Бородавко, born 4 November 1979) is a Kazakhstani water polo player. She competed in the women's tournament at the 2000 Summer Olympics.

== See also ==
- List of women's Olympic water polo tournament goalkeepers
