= Chloe Wilcox =

British water polo player (born 1986)

Personal information
- Born: 20 December 1986 (age 38); Carlisle, Great Britain

Sport
- Sport: Water polo

Chloe Wilcox (born 20 December 1986) is a British water polo player. She competed for Great Britain in the women's tournament at the 2012 Summer Olympics. This was the first ever Olympic GB women's water polo team. She also represented Great Britain at the 2013 World Championships. She has played for the Spanish club CN Mataró in the División de Honor de Waterpolo and the Balmain Tigers, Sydney, Australia. She is currently working at Manchester Met University in the High Performance Sports Team.
