= Francesca Clayton =

British water polo player

Personal information
- Born: 7 January 1990 (age 35); Nottingham
- Height: 1.7 m (5 ft 7 in)
- Weight: 69 kg (152 lb)

Sport
- Country: United Kingdom
- Sport: Water polo

Francesca Clayton (born 7 January 1990, Nottingham) is a British water polo player. She competed for Great Britain in the women's tournament at the 2012 Summer Olympics. This was the first ever Olympic GB women's water polo team.

She competed at the 2013 World Aquatics Championships.
