= Alicia McCormack =

Australian water polo player

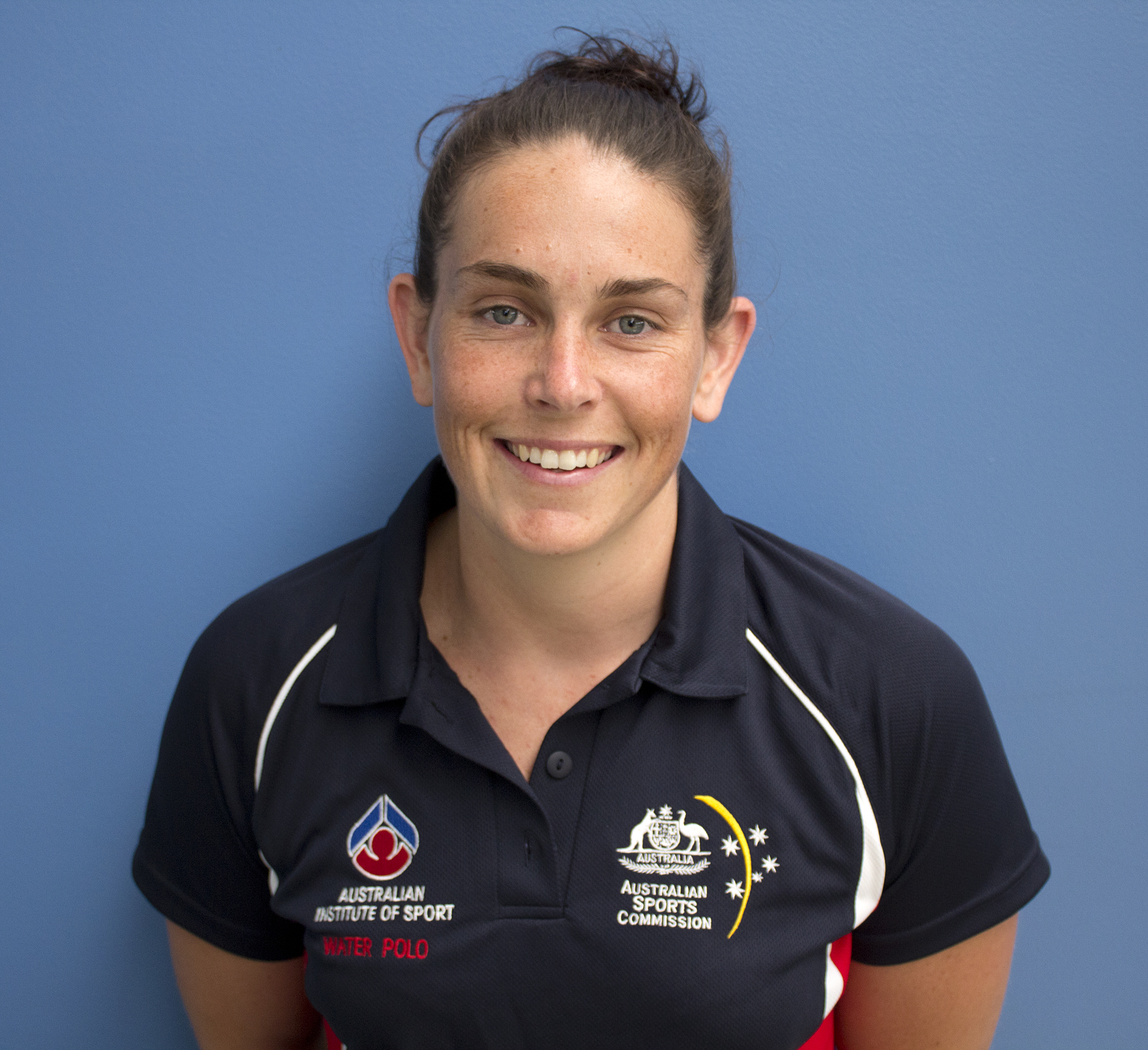

Personal information
- Born: 7 June 1983 (age 43) Helensburgh, New South Wales
- Height: 168 cm (5 ft 6 in) (2012)
- Weight: 72 kg (159 lb) (2012)

Sport
- Country: Australia
- Sport: Water polo
- Event: Women's team

Achievements and titles
- Olympic finals: 2008 Summer
Medal record
Women's water polo
Representing Australia
Olympic Games
| Bronze medal – third place | 2008 Beijing | Team competition |
| Bronze medal – third place | 2012 London | Team competition |
Commonwealth Games
| Gold medal – first place | 2006 Perth | Team competition |
FINA World Cup
| Gold medal – first place | 2006 Tianjin | Team competition |
World Aquatics Championship
| Silver medal – second place | 2007 Melbourne | Team competition |
FINA World League Super Finals
| Bronze medal – third place | 2005 Kirishi | Team competition |
| Bronze medal – third place | 2008 Tenerife | Team competition |
| Bronze medal – third place | 2009 Kirishi | Team competition |

Alicia McCormack (born 7 June 1983) is an Australian former water polo player. A goalkeeper, she played for the Cronulla Water Polo Club in the National Water Polo League and was a member of the Australia women's national water polo team. Although she did not play water polo in 2010 due to injury, McCormack has won gold medals at the 2006 Commonwealth Games and the 2006 FINA World Cup; a silver medal at the 2007 FINA World Championships; and bronze medals at the 2008 and 2012 Summer Olympics, 2005 FINA World League Super Finals, 2008 FINA World League Super Finals and 2009 FINA World League Super Finals.

== Personal life ==
It was quite funny, really. I knew the prince played water polo and that he was selected to represent at the 2002 Commonwealth Championships in Manchester. So when I told him what I did, he smiled and bowed. I gave him a book [Water Warriors] and some Australian water polo cossies. He said: 'Oh, bathers' and then someone told him they were also known as budgie smugglers. The prince laughed and from then on he wanted to know all about me, the national team, the Olympics. He didn't want to talk about himself at all.

— Alicia McCormack

McCormack was born on 7 June 1983 in Helensburgh, New South Wales. She is 168 cm (5 ft 6 in) tall, weighs 73 kilograms (161 lb), is right handed and has a tattoo featuring the Olympic rings.

McCormack entered Helensburgh Public School in 1988 as a kindergartener and later graduated from Kirrawee High School. She began a Bachelor of Primary Education while on scholarship at the New South Wales Institute of Sport (NSWIS). Her partner is a Navy clearance diver.

McCormack was at a barbecue attended by Prince William when he visited Sydney in 2010. At the barbecue, people ".... were surprised by the amount of "royal" attention McCormack, the Australian goalkeeper and a member of the [bronze]-medal winning team at the Beijing Olympics, received especially when Prince William was seen to bow to the amused McCormack at a barbecue."

In 2010, McCormack was working at the New South Wales Institute of Sport as the personal assistant to Charles Turner, the chief executive of the organisation.

Subsequently, McCormack married Ben Smith with whom she has a daughter and a son. After working for Water Polo Australia in administration and coaching, McCormack and her family traveled around Australia for 12 months. In 2017, the McCormack Smith family moved to Canowindra in the Central West of NSW where they have a farm. McCormack is also pursuing a career in real estate and property management.

== Water polo ==
McCormack is a goalkeeper, and prefers to wear cap number thirteen. She started playing water polo when she was fourteen years old for the Kirrawee High School team. In 2000, she represented New South Wales on the state junior team. She has a water polo scholarship from the New South Wales Institute of Sport.

=== Club water polo ===
McCormack played her club water polo for the Cronulla Water Polo Club in the National Water Polo League, serving as the team's head coach in 2010 when she was unable to play due to a shoulder injury. She returned to the playing roster in 2011, while also serving as an assistant coach on the team. She continued her involvement with the club into the 2012 season – during which she helped the side to 8–4 and 7–4 wins in the first two games of the season. She took a break from the Cronulla team following their 18 February 2012 game in order to attend the national team training camp.

=== Senior national team ===
McCormack was a member of the Australia women's national water polo team. She played her first game with the senior team at the 2003 Holiday Cup in the United States. In 2005, she was part of the side that won a bronze medal at the FINA World League Super Finals in Kirishi, Russia. That year, she was also part of the team that finished sixth at the FINA World Championships in Montreal, Canada.

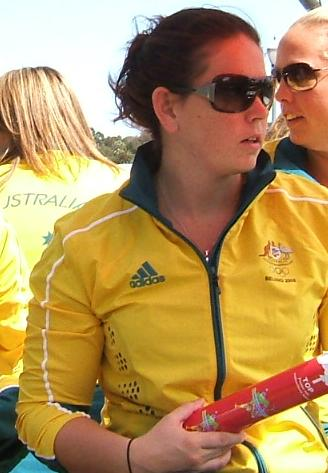
Alicia McCormack

In 2006, McCormack won a gold medal at the Commonwealth Games in Perth, Western Australia. That year, she was also part of the Australian side that finished fourth at the FINA World League Super Finals in Cosenza, Italy. She was also part of the 2006 FINA World Cup team in Tianjin, China, that won a gold medal. In a 2007 Asia-Oceania qualifier for the World League Super Finals, she made seventeen saves in a 19–2 victory against Japan. She was part of the 2007 silver winning side at the FINA World Championship in Melbourne, Australia. She played in goal in the December 2007 series against New Zealand where Australian won the first two tests 18–1 and 17–1.

McCormack was part of Australia's Oceania Olympic qualification campaign in 2008. In an 18–1 victory over New Zealand during the qualifiers, she made twelve saves. She was named to the team that competed in 2008 at the FINA world league preliminary round in Tianjin, China. In a 2008 Asia-Oceania qualifier against China for the World League Super Finals, she played in the 11–9 win that went to a penalty shoot out. She helped the team win by making a two handed stop of a Chinese shot in the last minutes of the game. She competed in the FINA World League Super Finals in Tenerife, Spain, where Australia took home a bronze medal. She won a bronze medal at the 2008 Summer Olympics as a member of the Australia women's national water polo team. Her team ended up in the bronze medal match after losing 8–9 to the United States in the semi-finals and playing against Hungary for the bronze. Earlier in the Olympics, her team had tied the Hungarians.

In 2009, McCormack was part of the Australian side that finished third at the FINA World League Super Finals in Kirishi, Russia. She was also part of the team that finished sixth at the FINA World Championships in Rome, Italy, in 2009. In April 2011, she attended a training camp at the Australian Institute of Sport where the coach was "selecting a team for the major championships over winter." She competed in a warm-up match for the 2011 FINA World League against Italy in Ostia, Italy, in July that Australia won 12–11. In February 2012, she was named to the final training squad for the 2012 Summer Olympics. She attended training camp that started on 20 February 2012 at the Australian Institute of Sport. The team of seventeen players will be cut to thirteen before the team departs for the Olympic games, with the announcement being made on 13 June. She was part of the Stingers squad that competed in a five-game test against Great Britain at the AIS in late February 2012. This was the team's first matches against Great Britain's national team in six years.

At the 2012 Summer Olympics, she was part of the team that won bronze.

== See also ==
- Australia women's Olympic water polo team records and statistics
- List of Olympic medalists in water polo (women)
- List of women's Olympic water polo tournament goalkeepers
- List of World Aquatics Championships medalists in water polo
