= Patrícia Horváth =

Hungarian water polo player (born 1977)

Personal information
- Nationality: Hungarian
- Born: 7 December 1977 (age 48) Miskolc, Hungary
- Height: 1.83 m (6 ft 0 in)
- Weight: 73 kg (161 lb)

Sport
- Sport: Water polo
- Position: Goalkeeper

Senior clubs
- Years: Team
- ?-?: Honvéd-Domino
National team
- Years: Team
- ?-?: Hungary

Patrícia Horváth (born 7 December 1977) is a Hungarian water polo player. She was a member of the Hungary women's national water polo team, playing as a goalkeeper.

She was a part of the team at the 2008 Summer Olympics. On club level, she played for Honvéd-Domino in Hungary.

== See also ==
- Hungary women's Olympic water polo team records and statistics
- List of women's Olympic water polo tournament goalkeepers
- List of world champions in women's water polo
- List of World Aquatics Championships medalists in water polo
