= Aikaterini Oikonomopoulou =

Greek water polo player

Katerina Oikonomopoulou
Personal information
- Born: 16 February 1978 (age 48) Athens, Greece
- Height: 180 cm (5 ft 11 in)
- Weight: 60 kg (132 lb)
Medal record
Women's water polo
Representing Greece
Olympic Games
Silver medal – second place	2004 Athens	Team
FINA Water Polo World League
Gold medal – first place	2005 Kirishi	Team

Aikaterini Oikonomopoulou or Katerina Oikonomopoulou (Greek: Κατερίνα Οικονομοπούλου; born 16 February 1978) is a female Greek water polo player and Olympic silver medalist with the Greece women's national water polo team.

She received a silver medal at the 2004 Summer Olympics in 2004 Athens.

She received a gold medal with the Greek team at the 2005 FINA Women's Water Polo World League in Kirishi.

== See also ==
- Greece women's Olympic water polo team records and statistics
- List of Olympic medalists in water polo (women)
