= Tan Ying (water polo) =

Chinese water polo player (born 1987)

Personal information
- Born: June 30, 1987 (age 38) Ningxia, China

Sport
- Sport: Water polo

Tan Ying (born June 30, 1987) is a female Chinese water polo player who was part of the national team at the 2006 World Cup. She competed at the 2008 Summer Olympics.

== See also ==
- China women's Olympic water polo team records and statistics
- List of women's Olympic water polo tournament goalkeepers
