= Anthoula Mylonaki =

Greek water polo player

Personal information
- Born: 10 June 1984 (age 42) Khania, Greece
- Height: 178 cm (5 ft 10 in)
- Weight: 77 kg (170 lb)
Medal record
Women's water polo
Representing Greece
Olympic Games
Silver medal – second place	2004 Athens	Team

Anthoula "Anthi" Mylonaki (Greek: Ανθούλα Μυλωνάκη, born 10 June 1984) is a female Greek water polo player and Olympic silver medalist. She is part of the Greece women's national water polo team.

== Career ==
Mylonaki received a silver medal at the 2004 Summer Olympics in 2004 Athens.

She participated at the 2008 Women's Water Polo Olympic Qualifier in Imperia, where Greece finished 4th and qualified for the 2008 Olympics in Beijing as one of the eight qualified countries.

== See also ==
- Greece women's Olympic water polo team records and statistics
- List of Olympic medalists in water polo (women)
- List of women's Olympic water polo tournament goalkeepers
