= Georgia Lara =

Greek water polo player

Personal information
- Born: 31 May 1980 (age 46) Athens, Greece

Sport
- Sport: Water polo
Medal record
Representing Greece
Olympic Games
Silver medal – second place	2004 Athens	Team competition
World Championship
Gold medal – first place	2011 Shanghai	Team competition
FINA Water Polo World League
Gold medal – first place	2005 Kirishi	Team competition

Giouli "Georgia" Lara (Greek: Γιούλη Λάρα; born 31 May 1980) is a female Greek water polo player and Olympic silver medalist with the Greece women's national water polo team.

Gold medalist in Shanghai, China in 2011 at the water polo world championships.

She received a silver medal at the 2004 Summer Olympics in 2004 Athens.

She received a gold medal with the Greek team at the 2005 FINA Women's Water Polo World League in Kirishi.

She played at the 2006 FINA Women's Water Polo World Cup, where Greece finished 6th, and at the 2006 Women's European Water Polo Championship, where the Greek team also finished 6th.

She participated at the 2008 Women's Water Polo Olympic Qualifier in Imperia, where Greece finished 4th and qualified for the 2008 Olympics in Beijing.

She was voted top 5 center forwards in 2006 in Belgrade, Serbia.

== See also ==
- Greece women's Olympic water polo team records and statistics
- List of Olympic medalists in water polo (women)
- List of world champions in women's water polo
- List of World Aquatics Championships medalists in water polo
