= Svetlana Buravova-Khapsalis =

Kazakhstani water polo player

Svetlana Khapsalis
Personal information
- Full name: Svetlana Buravova (-Khapsalis)
- Nationality: Kazakhstan
- Born: 15 June 1973 (age 53) Russian SFSR, Soviet Union
- Height: 1.86 m (6 ft 1 in)
- Weight: 63 kg (139 lb)

Sport
- Sport: Water polo
- Position: goalkeeper

Senior clubs
- Years: Team
- ?-?: Eurasia Rakhat
National team
- Years: Team
- ?-?: Kazakhstan

Svetlana Buravova-Khapsalis (Светлана Владимировна Буравова-Хапсалис, born 15 June 1973) was a Russian born Kazakhstani female water polo player. She was a member of the Kazakhstan women's national water polo team, playing as a goalkeeper.

She competed for the team at the 2000 Summer Olympics; she was also part of the team at the 2004 Summer Olympics, but did not play. On club level she played for Eurasia Rakhat in Kazakhstan.

== See also ==
- List of women's Olympic water polo tournament goalkeepers
