= Galina Rytova =

Russian water polo player

Personal information
- Born: 10 September 1975 (age 50) Moscow, Soviet Union
- Height: 1.73 m (5 ft 8 in)
- Weight: 68 kg (150 lb)

Sport
- Sport: Water polo
Medal record
Representing Russia
Olympic Games
Bronze medal – third place	2000 Sydney	Team competition
European Championship
Bronze medal – third place	1999 Prato	Team competition
Bronze medal – third place	2001 Budapest	Team competition
Representing Kazakhstan
Asian Games
Silver medal – second place	2010 Guangzhou	Team competition

Galina Mikhailovna Rytova (Russian: Галина Михайловна Рытова, born 10 September 1975) is a Russian/Kazakhstani water polo player who competed in the 2000 Summer Olympics for Russia and in the 2004 Summer Olympics for Kazakhstan.

In 2000, she won the bronze medal with the Russian team.

She participated as a part of the Kazakhstani team which was eliminated in the first round at the 2004 Summer Olympics, and participated at the 2012 Summer Olympics.

== See also ==
- Russia women's Olympic water polo team records and statistics
- List of Olympic medalists in water polo (women)
- List of women's Olympic water polo tournament goalkeepers
