= Stavroula Kozompoli =

Greek water polo player

Stavroula Kozompoli OLY
Personal information
- Born: 14 January 1974 (age 52) Athens, Greece

Sport
- Sport: Water polo
Medal record
Representing Greece
Olympic Games
Silver medal – second place	2004 Athens	Team
FINA Water Polo World League
Gold medal – first place	2005 Kirishi	Team

Stavroula "Voula" Kozomboli (Greek: Σταυρούλα "Βούλα" Κοζομπόλη, born 14 January 1974) is a female Greek water polo player and Olympic silver medalist with the Greece women's national water polo team.

She received a silver medal at the 2004 Summer Olympics in 2004 Athens.

She received a gold medal with the Greek team at the 2005 FINA Women's Water Polo World League in Kirishi.

She was top scorer (12 goals) at the 2004 FINA Women's Water Polo World League in Long Beach, California with Tania di Mario, where Greece finished 6th.

== See also ==
- Greece women's Olympic water polo team records and statistics
- List of Olympic medalists in water polo (women)
