= Galina Zlotnikova =

Russian water polo player

Personal information
- Full name: Galina Borisovna Zlotnikova
- Nationality: Russia
- Born: 1984 (age 41–42) Gorky, Soviet Union
- Height: 1.76 m (5 ft 9 in)
- Weight: 74 kg (163 lb)

Sport
- Sport: Water polo
- Position: goalkeeper

Senior clubs
- Years: Team
- ?-?: Kinef Kirishi
National team
- Years: Team
- ?-?: Russia
Medal record
Representing Russia
World Championships
Bronze medal – third place	2003 Barcelona	Team competition

Galina Borisovna Zlotnikova (Галина Борисовна Злотникова, born 1984) is a Russian female former water polo player.

She was a member of the Russia women's national water polo team, playing as a goalkeeper. She was a part of the team at the 2004 Summer Olympics. On club level she played for Kinef Kirishi in Russia.

== See also ==
- Russia women's Olympic water polo team records and statistics
- List of women's Olympic water polo tournament goalkeepers
- List of World Aquatics Championships medalists in water polo
