= Kyriaki Liosi =

Greek water polo player

Personal information
- Born: 30 October 1979 (age 46) Athens, Greece

Sport
- Sport: Water polo
Medal record
Representing Greece
Olympic Games
Silver medal – second place	2004 Athens	Team competition
World Championship
Gold medal – first place	2011 Shanghai	Team competition
FINA Water Polo World League
Gold medal – first place	2005 Kirishi	Team competition

Kyriaki "Kiki" Liosi (Greek: Κυριακή "Κική" Λιόση; born 30 October 1979) is a female Greek water polo player and Olympic silver medalist with the Greece women's national water polo team.

She received a silver medal at the 2004 Summer Olympics in 2004 Athens. She was the top sprinter at the 2004 Olympics, with 21 sprints won.

She received a gold medal with the Greek team at the 2005 FINA Women's Water Polo World League in Kirishi.

Liosi participated at the 2008 Women's Water Polo Olympic Qualifier in Imperia, where Greece finished 4th and qualified for the 2008 Olympics, in Beijing.

At club level, she played for Olympiacos (1998–2003), Glyfada (2003–2005) and Vouliagmeni (2005–2013).

== See also ==
- Greece women's Olympic water polo team records and statistics
- List of Olympic medalists in water polo (women)
- List of world champions in women's water polo
- List of World Aquatics Championships medalists in water polo
