= Jemma Brownlow =

Australian water polo player

Personal information
- Nationality: Australia
- Born: 14 November 1979 (age 46) Sydney
- Height: 1.68 m (5 ft 6 in)
- Weight: 62 kg (137 lb)

Sport
- Sport: Water polo
- Position: goalkeeper

Senior clubs
- Years: Team
- ?-?: Balmain Tigers
National team
- Years: Team
- ?-?: Australia

Jemma Brownlow (born 14 November 1979) is an Australian former water polo player. She was a member of the Australia women's national water polo team, playing as a goalkeeper.

She was a part of the team at the 2004 Summer Olympics. On club level she played for Balmain Tigers in Australia. She graduated from Macquarie University.

== See also ==
- Australia women's Olympic water polo team records and statistics
- List of women's Olympic water polo tournament goalkeepers
