= Georgia Ellinaki =

Greek water polo player

Personal information
- Born: 28 February 1974 (age 52) Athens, Greece

Sport
- Sport: Water polo
Medal record
Representing Greece
Olympic Games
Silver medal – second place	2004 Athens	Team competition

Georgia Ellinaki (Greek: Γεωργία Ελληνάκή, born 28 February 1974) is a female Greek water polo player and Olympic silver medalist with the Greece women's national water polo team.

She received a silver medal at the 2004 Summer Olympics in Athens.

== See also ==
- Greece women's Olympic water polo team records and statistics
- List of Olympic medalists in water polo (women)
- List of women's Olympic water polo tournament goalkeepers
