= Emma Knox =

Australian water polo player (born 1978)

Personal information
- Born: 2 March 1978 (age 48) Dampier, Western Australia, Australia

Sport
- Sport: Water polo
Medal record
Representing Australia
Olympic Games
Bronze medal – third place	2008 Beijing	Team competition
World Championships
Silver medal – second place	2007 Melbourne	Team competition

Emma Knox (born 2 March 1978) is an Australian water polo player. She was a member of the Australia women's national water polo team that won a bronze medal at the 2008 Beijing Olympics.

== See also ==
- Australia women's Olympic water polo team records and statistics
- List of Olympic medalists in water polo (women)
- List of women's Olympic water polo tournament goalkeepers
- List of World Aquatics Championships medalists in water polo
