= Elena Gigli =

Italian water polo player (born 1985)

Personal information
- Nationality: Italian
- Born: 9 July 1985 (age 40) Empoli, Italy

Sport
- Country: Italy
- Sport: Water polo
Medal record
Olympic Games
Gold medal – first place	2004 Athens	Team competition
European Championships
Gold medal – first place	2012 Eindhoven	Team competition
Silver medal – second place	2006 Belgrade	Team competition
FINA World Cup
Silver medal – second place	2006 Tianjin	Team competition

Elena Gigli (born 9 July 1985) is a female water polo goalkeeper from Italy, who won the gold medal with the Women's National Team at the 2004 Summer Olympics in Athens, Greece. She was the top goalkeeper at the 2012 Olympics, with 56 saves. She also won silver medal in European championship in Belgrado in 2006. Her club team is Fiorentina Waterpolo Giotti (Italy) and she won the Len Champions Cup and Italian league in 2006/2007.

== See also ==
- Italy women's Olympic water polo team records and statistics
- List of Olympic champions in women's water polo
- List of Olympic medalists in water polo (women)
- List of players who have appeared in multiple women's Olympic water polo tournaments
- List of women's Olympic water polo tournament goalkeepers
