= Water polo at the 2012 Summer Olympics – Women's tournament =

Women's water polo at the Games of the XXX Olympiad

Tournament details
- Host country: United Kingdom
- City: London
- Venue(s): Water Polo Arena
- Dates: 30 July – 9 August 2012
- Teams: 8 (from 4 confederations)
- Competitors: 102

Final positions
- Champions: United States (1st title)
- Runners-up: Spain
- Third place: Australia
- Fourth place: Hungary

Tournament statistics
- Matches: 24
- Goals scored: 468 (19.5 per match)
- Multiple appearances: 4-time Olympian(s): 3; 3-time Olympian(s): 6
- Multiple medalists: 4-time medalist(s): 2
- Top scorer(s): (United States) Maggie Steffens (21 goals in 6 matches)
- Most saves: (Italy) Elena Gigli (56 saves in 6 matches)
- Top sprinter(s): (Australia) Kate Gynther (Spain) Jennifer Pareja (21 sprints won in 6 matches)
- MVP: (United States) Maggie Steffens

The women's water polo tournament at the 2012 Summer Olympics in London was held from 30 July to 9 August at the Water Polo Arena.

Teams from eight nations competed in the tournament and have been seeded into two groups for the preliminary round. A total of 24 games were played, 12 of them in the preliminary round.

== Format ==
The tournament featured eight teams, separated into two groups of four teams. Each team played the other three teams in its pool once in a round-robin format. All eight teams advanced to the quarterfinal stage where they were seeded and played against a team from the other group.

The winners of the quarterfinal games moved on to the semifinals, while the quarterfinal losers played a series of classification games. The semifinal winners played in the gold medal game, while the losers played each other for the bronze.

== Preliminary round ==
All times are BST (UTC+1).

=== Group A ===
Team	Pld	W	D	L	GF	GA	GD	Pts
Spain	3	2	1	0	33	26	+7	5
United States	3	2	1	0	30	28	+2	5
Hungary	3	1	0	2	35	37	−2	2
China	3	0	0	3	22	29	−7	0

30 July 2012; 14:10	Report	Spain	11–6	China	Water Polo Arena, London; Referees: Alan Balfanbayev (KAZ), Cory Williams (NZL)
30 July 2012; 14:10	Report	Score by quarters: 2–2, 4–2, 4–2, 1–0			Water Polo Arena, London; Referees: Alan Balfanbayev (KAZ), Cory Williams (NZL)
30 July 2012; 14:10	Report	Espar 3	Goals	Ma Huanhuan 3	Water Polo Arena, London; Referees: Alan Balfanbayev (KAZ), Cory Williams (NZL)

30 July 2012; 19:40	Report	Hungary	13–14	United States	Water Polo Arena, London; Referees: Brian Littlejohn (GBR), Denis Danelon (BRA)
30 July 2012; 19:40	Report	Score by quarters: 3–4, 4–4, 2–3, 4–3			Water Polo Arena, London; Referees: Brian Littlejohn (GBR), Denis Danelon (BRA)
30 July 2012; 19:40	Report	Bujka 4	Goals	Steffens 7	Water Polo Arena, London; Referees: Brian Littlejohn (GBR), Denis Danelon (BRA)

1 August 2012; 14:10	Report	Hungary	11–10	China	Water Polo Arena, London; Referees: Georgios Stavridis (GRE), Svetlana Dreval (RUS)
1 August 2012; 14:10	Report	Score by quarters: 1–3, 4–4, 4–3, 2–0			Water Polo Arena, London; Referees: Georgios Stavridis (GRE), Svetlana Dreval (RUS)
1 August 2012; 14:10	Report	Szűcs 4	Goals	four players 2	Water Polo Arena, London; Referees: Georgios Stavridis (GRE), Svetlana Dreval (RUS)

1 August 2012; 18:20	Report	Spain	9–9	United States	Water Polo Arena, London; Referees: Marie Deslieres (CAN), Anton Bervoets (NED)
1 August 2012; 18:20	Report	Score by quarters: 3–1, 2–2, 1–4, 3–2			Water Polo Arena, London; Referees: Marie Deslieres (CAN), Anton Bervoets (NED)
1 August 2012; 18:20	Report	Pareja 4	Goals	Craig 4	Water Polo Arena, London; Referees: Marie Deslieres (CAN), Anton Bervoets (NED)

3 August 2012; 14:10	Report	Spain	13–11	Hungary	Water Polo Arena, London; Referees: Massimiliano Caputi (ITA), Svetlana Dreval (RUS)
3 August 2012; 14:10	Report	Score by quarters: 4–3, 3–2, 3–2, 3–4			Water Polo Arena, London; Referees: Massimiliano Caputi (ITA), Svetlana Dreval (RUS)
3 August 2012; 14:10	Report	Espar 3	Goals	Antal 4	Water Polo Arena, London; Referees: Massimiliano Caputi (ITA), Svetlana Dreval (RUS)

3 August 2012; 19:40	Report	China	6–7	United States	Water Polo Arena, London; Referees: Daniel Flahive (AUS), Marijo Brguljan (MNE)
3 August 2012; 19:40	Report	Score by quarters: 1–0, 2–2, 0–3, 3–2			Water Polo Arena, London; Referees: Daniel Flahive (AUS), Marijo Brguljan (MNE)
3 August 2012; 19:40	Report	Sun Yating, Ma Huanhuan 2	Goals	Steffens 3	Water Polo Arena, London; Referees: Daniel Flahive (AUS), Marijo Brguljan (MNE)

=== Group B ===
Team	Pld	W	D	L	GF	GA	GD	Pts
Australia	3	3	0	0	37	19	+18	6
Russia	3	2	0	1	22	21	+1	4
Italy	3	1	0	2	22	22	0	2
Great Britain	3	0	0	3	14	33	−19	0

30 July 2012; 15:30	Report	Italy	8–10	Australia	Water Polo Arena, London; Referees: Steven Rotsart (USA), Gyorgy Juhasz (HUN)
30 July 2012; 15:30	Report	Score by quarters: 1–2, 3–2, 0–4, 4–2			Water Polo Arena, London; Referees: Steven Rotsart (USA), Gyorgy Juhasz (HUN)
30 July 2012; 15:30	Report	Di Mario, Radicchi 2	Goals	Gynther 3	Water Polo Arena, London; Referees: Steven Rotsart (USA), Gyorgy Juhasz (HUN)

30 July 2012; 18:20	Report	Great Britain	6–7	Russia	Water Polo Arena, London; Referees: Marie Deslieres (CAN), Ni Shiwei (CHN)
30 July 2012; 18:20	Report	Score by quarters: 2–3, 3–2, 0–1, 1–1			Water Polo Arena, London; Referees: Marie Deslieres (CAN), Ni Shiwei (CHN)
30 July 2012; 18:20	Report	Winstanley-Smith 3	Goals	Beliaeva, Prokofyeva 2	Water Polo Arena, London; Referees: Marie Deslieres (CAN), Ni Shiwei (CHN)

1 August 2012; 15:30	Report	Italy	4–7	Russia	Water Polo Arena, London; Referees: Sergi Sanchez (ESP), German Moller (ARG)
1 August 2012; 15:30	Report	Score by quarters: 0–1, 1–1, 1–4, 2–1			Water Polo Arena, London; Referees: Sergi Sanchez (ESP), German Moller (ARG)
1 August 2012; 15:30	Report	Di Mario 2	Goals	Lisunova 3	Water Polo Arena, London; Referees: Sergi Sanchez (ESP), German Moller (ARG)

1 August 2012; 19:40	Report	Great Britain	3–16	Australia	Water Polo Arena, London; Referees: Gus Pinker (RSA), Denis Danelon (BRA)
1 August 2012; 19:40	Report	Score by quarters: 1–3, 1–3, 1–5, 0–5			Water Polo Arena, London; Referees: Gus Pinker (RSA), Denis Danelon (BRA)
1 August 2012; 19:40	Report	Wilcox 2	Goals	Webster 5	Water Polo Arena, London; Referees: Gus Pinker (RSA), Denis Danelon (BRA)

3 August 2012; 15:30	Report	Russia	8–11	Australia	Water Polo Arena, London; Referees: Dragan Stampalja (CRO), Marie Deslieres (CAN)
3 August 2012; 15:30	Report	Score by quarters: 4–6, 1–2, 1–0, 2–3			Water Polo Arena, London; Referees: Dragan Stampalja (CRO), Marie Deslieres (CAN)
3 August 2012; 15:30	Report	Lisunova 3	Goals	Gynther 2	Water Polo Arena, London; Referees: Dragan Stampalja (CRO), Marie Deslieres (CAN)

3 August 2012; 18:20	Report	Great Britain	5–10	Italy	Water Polo Arena, London; Referees: German Moller (ARG), Kazuhiko Makita (JPN)
3 August 2012; 18:20	Report	Score by quarters: 2–4, 1–2, 1–2, 1–2			Water Polo Arena, London; Referees: German Moller (ARG), Kazuhiko Makita (JPN)
3 August 2012; 18:20	Report	Gibson-Byrne 2	Goals	Emmolo, Di Mario 3	Water Polo Arena, London; Referees: German Moller (ARG), Kazuhiko Makita (JPN)

== Final round ==
Final bracket

Quarterfinals
A1	Spain	9
B4	Great Britain	7
A3	Hungary	11
B2	Russia	10
A2	United States	9
B3	Italy	6
A4	China	18
B1	Australia (PSO)	20

Semifinals
A1	Spain	10
A3	Hungary	9
A2	United States	11
B1	Australia	9

Gold medal match
2nd place, silver medalist(s)	Spain	5
1st place, gold medalist(s)	United States	8
Bronze medal match
3rd place, bronze medalist(s)	Australia	13
4	Hungary	11

5th place bracket

5th–8th place classification
Russia	11
Great Britain	9
Italy	10
China	14

5th place match
China	16
Russia	15
7th place match
Italy	11
Great Britain	7

=== Quarterfinals ===
All times are BST (UTC+1).

5 August 2012; 14:50	Report	Hungary	11–10	Russia	Water Polo Arena, London; Referees: Massimiliano Caputi (ITA), Marijo Mrguljan (MNE)
5 August 2012; 14:50	Report	Score by quarters: 3–3, 4–2, 1–3, 3–2			Water Polo Arena, London; Referees: Massimiliano Caputi (ITA), Marijo Mrguljan (MNE)
5 August 2012; 14:50	Report	four players 2	Goals	Ivanova 4	Water Polo Arena, London; Referees: Massimiliano Caputi (ITA), Marijo Mrguljan (MNE)

5 August 2012; 16:10	Report	China	18–20 (OT, PSO)	Australia	Water Polo Arena, London; Referees: Georgios Stavridis (GRE), Dragan Stampalija (CRO)
5 August 2012; 16:10	Report	Score by quarters: 5–5, 3–3, 4–2, 2–4 OT: 1–2, 1–0 PSO: 2–4			Water Polo Arena, London; Referees: Georgios Stavridis (GRE), Dragan Stampalija (CRO)
5 August 2012; 16:10	Report	Ma Huanhuan 4	Goals	Ralph, Zagame 3	Water Polo Arena, London; Referees: Georgios Stavridis (GRE), Dragan Stampalija (CRO)

5 August 2012; 19:00	Report	United States	9–6	Italy	Water Polo Arena, London; Referees: Adrian Alexandrescu (ROU), Mihajlo Ćirić (SRB)
5 August 2012; 19:00	Report	Score by quarters: 3–3, 3–0, 0–1, 3–2			Water Polo Arena, London; Referees: Adrian Alexandrescu (ROU), Mihajlo Ćirić (SRB)
5 August 2012; 19:00	Report	Seidemann 3	Goals	Di Mario 3	Water Polo Arena, London; Referees: Adrian Alexandrescu (ROU), Mihajlo Ćirić (SRB)

5 August 2012; 20:20	Report	Spain	9–7	Great Britain	Water Polo Arena, London; Referees: Cory Williams (NZL), Gus Pinker (RSA)
5 August 2012; 20:20	Report	Score by quarters: 3–2, 3–0, 2–3, 1–2			Water Polo Arena, London; Referees: Cory Williams (NZL), Gus Pinker (RSA)
5 August 2012; 20:20	Report	Miranda, Espar 2	Goals	Painter-Snell 3	Water Polo Arena, London; Referees: Cory Williams (NZL), Gus Pinker (RSA)

=== 5th–8th place classification ===
All times are BST (UTC+1).

7 August 2012; 14:10	Report	Italy	10–14	China	Water Polo Arena, London; Referees: Svetlana Dreval (RUS), Anton Bervoets (NED)
7 August 2012; 14:10	Report	Score by quarters: 2–5, 2–5, 2–2, 4–2			Water Polo Arena, London; Referees: Svetlana Dreval (RUS), Anton Bervoets (NED)
7 August 2012; 14:10	Report	Di Mario 4	Goals	six players 2	Water Polo Arena, London; Referees: Svetlana Dreval (RUS), Anton Bervoets (NED)

7 August 2012; 18:20	Report	Russia	11–9	Great Britain	Water Polo Arena, London; Referees: Denis Danelon (BRA), German Moller (ARG)
7 August 2012; 18:20	Report	Score by quarters: 3–3, 1–2, 4–2, 3–2			Water Polo Arena, London; Referees: Denis Danelon (BRA), German Moller (ARG)
7 August 2012; 18:20	Report	Prokofyeva 4	Goals	Wilcox, Painter-Snell 3	Water Polo Arena, London; Referees: Denis Danelon (BRA), German Moller (ARG)

=== Semifinals ===
All times are BST (UTC+1).

7 August 2012; 15:30	Report	United States	11–9 (OT)	Australia	Water Polo Arena, London; Referees: Ulrich Spiegel (GER), Marie Deslieres (CAN)
7 August 2012; 15:30	Report	Score by quarters: 3–3, 3–2, 1–1, 2–3 OT: 2–0, 0–0			Water Polo Arena, London; Referees: Ulrich Spiegel (GER), Marie Deslieres (CAN)
7 August 2012; 15:30	Report	Steffens 4	Goals	Southern 4	Water Polo Arena, London; Referees: Ulrich Spiegel (GER), Marie Deslieres (CAN)

7 August 2012; 19:40	Report	Hungary	9–10	Spain	Water Polo Arena, London; Referees: Dragan Stampalija (CRO), Massimiliano Caputi (ITA)
7 August 2012; 19:40	Report	Score by quarters: 1–2, 4–5, 2–2, 2–1			Water Polo Arena, London; Referees: Dragan Stampalija (CRO), Massimiliano Caputi (ITA)
7 August 2012; 19:40	Report	three players 2	Goals	Espar 4	Water Polo Arena, London; Referees: Dragan Stampalija (CRO), Massimiliano Caputi (ITA)

=== 7th place match ===
All times are BST (UTC+1).

9 August 2012; 14:30	Report	Italy	11–7	Great Britain	Water Polo Arena, London; Referees: Daniel Flahive (AUS), Gyorgy Juhasz (HUN)
9 August 2012; 14:30	Report	Score by quarters: 2–3, 4–0, 3–2, 2–2			Water Polo Arena, London; Referees: Daniel Flahive (AUS), Gyorgy Juhasz (HUN)
9 August 2012; 14:30	Report	Di Mario 4	Goals	McCann, Clayton 2	Water Polo Arena, London; Referees: Daniel Flahive (AUS), Gyorgy Juhasz (HUN)

=== 5th place match ===
All times are BST (UTC+1).

9 August 2012; 15:50	Report	China	16–15 (OT)	Russia	Water Polo Arena, London; Referees: Brian Littlejohn (GBR), Steven Rotsart (USA)
9 August 2012; 15:50	Report	Score by quarters: 3–3, 5–6, 3–2, 3–3 OT: 1–0, 1–1			Water Polo Arena, London; Referees: Brian Littlejohn (GBR), Steven Rotsart (USA)
9 August 2012; 15:50	Report	Ma Huanhuan 6	Goals	Fedotova, Antonova 4	Water Polo Arena, London; Referees: Brian Littlejohn (GBR), Steven Rotsart (USA)

=== Bronze medal match ===
All times are BST (UTC+1).

9 August 2012; 18:40	Report	(bronze) Australia	13–11 (OT)	Hungary	Water Polo Arena, London; Referees: Adrian Alexandrescu (ROU), Dragan Stampalija (CRO)
9 August 2012; 18:40	Report	Score by quarters: 2–1, 5–3, 3–4, 1–3 OT: 1–0, 1–0			Water Polo Arena, London; Referees: Adrian Alexandrescu (ROU), Dragan Stampalija (CRO)
9 August 2012; 18:40	Report	Beadsworth 4	Goals	Keszthelyi 3	Water Polo Arena, London; Referees: Adrian Alexandrescu (ROU), Dragan Stampalija (CRO)

=== Gold medal match ===
All times are BST (UTC+1).

9 August 2012; 20:25	Report	(gold) United States	8–5	Spain (silver)	Water Polo Arena, London; Referees: Marie Deslieres (CAN), Georgios Stavridis (GRE)
9 August 2012; 20:25	Report	Score by quarters: 1–1, 4–1, 2–0, 1–3			Water Polo Arena, London; Referees: Marie Deslieres (CAN), Georgios Stavridis (GRE)
9 August 2012; 20:25	Report	Steffens 5	Goals	Pareja 3	Water Polo Arena, London; Referees: Marie Deslieres (CAN), Georgios Stavridis (GRE)

== Ranking and statistics ==
=== Final ranking ===
Rank	Team
1	United States
2	Spain
3	Australia
4	Hungary
5	China
6	Russia
7	Italy
8	Great Britain

2012 Women's Olympic champions

United States
First title

=== Multi-time Olympians ===
Four-time Olympian(s): 3 players

- Russia: Sofia Konukh
- United States: Heather Petri, Brenda Villa

Three-time Olympian(s): 6 players

- Australia: Kate Gynther, Melissa Rippon
- Hungary: Rita Drávucz
- Italy: Tania Di Mario, Elena Gigli (GK), Anikó Pelle

=== Multiple medalists ===
Four-time Olympic medalist(s): 2 players

- United States: Heather Petri, Brenda Villa

=== Top goalscorers ===
Rank	Name	Goals	Shots	%
1	(United States) Maggie Steffens	21	27	78
2	(China) Ma Huanhuan	19	53	36
3	(Italy) Tania Di Mario	18	45	40
4	(Spain) Anni Espar	15	41	37
5	(Australia) Nicola Zagame	12	16	75
5	(Hungary) Barbara Bujka	12	26	46
5	(Hungary) Dóra Antal	12	32	37
5	(Australia) Ashleigh Southern	12	32	37
5	(Hungary) Gabriella Szűcs	12	32	37
5	(Spain) Jennifer Pareja	12	34	35
5	(Australia) Rowie Webster	12	42	29

== Medallists ==
Gold	Silver	Bronze
United States Elizabeth Armstrong; Heather Petri; Melissa Seidemann; Brenda Villa; Lauren Wenger; Maggie Steffens; Courtney Mathewson; Jessica Steffens; Elsie Windes; Kelly Rulon; Annika Dries; Kami Craig; Tumuaialii Anae Head coach: Adam Krikorian	Spain Laura Ester; Marta Bach; Anni Espar; Roser Tarragó; Matilde Ortiz; Jennifer Pareja; Lorena Miranda; Pilar Peña; Andrea Blas; Ona Meseguer; Maica García; Laura López; Ana Copado Head coach: Miki Oca	Australia Victoria Brown; Gemma Beadsworth; Sophie Smith; Holly Lincoln-Smith; Jane Moran; Bronwen Knox; Rowena Webster; Kate Gynther; Glencora Ralph; Ashleigh Southern; Melissa Rippon; Nicola Zagame; Alicia McCormack Head coach: Greg McFadden

== Awards ==
The women's all-star team was announced on 9 August 2012.

Most Valuable Player

- (United States) Maggie Steffens (21 goals)

Media All-Star Team

- Goalkeeper
  - (United States) Elizabeth Armstrong (53 saves)
- Field players
  - (Hungary) Barbara Bujka (centre forward, left-handed, 12 goals)
  - (Spain) Anni Espar (15 goals)
  - (Australia) Holly Lincoln-Smith (centre back, 5 goals)
  - (Spain) Jennifer Pareja (12 goals, 21 sprints won)
  - (United States) Maggie Steffens (21 goals)
  - (Australia) Nicola Zagame (12 goals, 4 sprints won)

== See also ==
- Water polo at the 2012 Summer Olympics – Men's tournament

== Sources ==
- PDF documents on the FINA website:
  - Official Results Book – 2012 Olympic Games – Diving, Swimming, Synchronised Swimming, Water Polo (archive) (pp. 284–507)
- Water polo on the Olympedia website
  - Water polo at the 2012 Summer Olympics (women's tournament)
- Water polo on the Sports Reference website
  - Water polo at the 2012 Summer Games (women's tournament) (archived)
