= 2005 FINA Women's Water Polo World League =

- League: FINA Water Polo World League
- Sport: Water Polo

FINA Women's Water Polo World League seasons
- ← 2004 2006 →

The 2005 FINA Women's Water Polo World League was the second edition of the annual event, organised by the world's governing body in aquatics, the FINA. Two qualification tournaments were held, before the Super Finals took off in Kirishi, Russia from August 18 to August 21, 2005.

== Preliminary round ==
=== GROUP A ===
- Held from June 29 to July 10, 2005, in the La Jolla Coggan Family Aquatic Complex in La Jolla, United States and the Aquatic Center of Eisenhower Park on Long Island, New York.

	Team	Points	G	W	D	L	GF	GA	Diff
1.	United States	25	10	8	0	2	84	45	+39
2.	Canada	24	10	8	0	2	83	63	+20
3.	Australia	22	10	6	0	4	83	49	+34
4.	Greece	22	10	6	0	4	77	61	+16
5.	Brazil	12	10	1	0	9	34	86	–52
6.	Germany	12	10	1	0	9	51	108	–57

- Thursday June 30, 2005 in La Jolla

Canada	10 – 4	Brazil
Greece	5 – 8	Australia
United States	11 – 5	Germany

- Friday July 1, 2005 in La Jolla

Germany	6 – 10	Brazil
Greece	6 – 7	Canada
United States	7 – 5	Australia

- Saturday July 2, 2005 in La Jolla

Greece	10 – 6	Germany
Canada	7 – 4	Australia
United States	10 – 0	Brazil

- Saturday July 2, 2005 in La Jolla

Germany	10 – 14	Australia
Brazil	2 – 7	Greece
United States	10 – 8	Canada

- Sunday July 3, 2005 in La Jolla

Canada	Germany
Australia	Brazil
United States	Greece

- Wednesday July 6, 2005 on Long Island

Canada	6 – 4	Greece
Australia	9 – 3	Brazil
United States	15 – 1	Germany

- Thursday July 7, 2005 on Long Island

Greece	9 – 7	Australia
Germany	9 – 5	Brazil
United States	7 – 5	Canada

- Friday July 8, 2005 on Long Island

Greece	9 – 5	Brazil
Canada	8 – 3	Germany
Australia	7 – 3	United States

- Saturday July 9, 2005 on Long Island

Australia	15 – 5	Germany
Canada	9 – 4	Brazil
United States	7 – 6	Greece

- Sunday July 10, 2005 on Long Island

Greece	9 – 3	Germany
Canada	7 – 6	Australia
United States	9 – 1	Brazil

=== GROUP B ===
- Held from June 29 to July 10, 2005

	Team	Points	G	W	D	L	GF	GA	Diff
1.	Hungary	28	10	9	0	1	111	64	+47
2.	Russia	24	10	8	0	2	99	75	+24
3.	Italy	22	10	6	0	4	105	75	+30
4.	Netherlands	17	10	4	0	6	75	77	–2
5.	Spain	15	10	3	0	7	82	83	–1
6.	France	10	10	0	0	10	44	142	–98

== Super Finals ==
- Held from August 18 to August 21, 2005, in Kirishi, Russia
- August 18, 2005

Canada	9 – 2	Italy
Hungary	4 – 6	Greece
United States	13 – 3	Netherlands
Russia	14 – 13	Australia

- August 19, 2005

Canada	9 – 10	Greece
Hungary	16 – 6	Italy
United States	10 – 11	Australia
Russia	16 – 8	Netherlands

- August 20, 2005

Australia	12 – 6	Netherlands
Italy	6 – 15	Greece
Canada	4 – 11	Hungary
Russia	15 – 14	United States

=== Play-offs ===
- August 21, 2005

Netherlands	11 – 6	Italy
United States	6 – 3	Canada
Australia	6 – 4	Hungary
Russia	10 – 13	Greece

== Final ranking ==
=== Final ranking ===
Rank	Team
Gold medal	Greece
Silver medal	Russia
Bronze medal	Australia
4	Hungary
5	United States
6	Canada
7	Netherlands
8	Italy

2005 FINA Women's Water Polo World League

Greece
First title

== Individual awards ==
- Most Valuable Player
  - Sofia Konukh (RUS)
- Best Goalkeeper
  - Rachel Riddell (CAN)

RANK	TOPSCORERS	GOALS
1.	Antigoni Roumpesi (GRE)	31
1.	Elena Smurova (RUS)	31
3.	Rita Dravucz (HUN)	28
3.	Kate Gynther (AUS)	28
5.	Aniko Pelle (HUN)	27
6.	Manuela Zanchi (ITA)	23
6.	Dora Kisteleki (HUN)	23
8.	Blanca Gil (ESP)	21
8.	Sofia Konukh (RUS)	21
8.	Rianne Guichelaar (NED)	21
11.	Tania di Mario (ITA)	20
11.	Natalie Golda (USA)	20
11.	Mariya Yaina (RUS)	20
14.	Mieke van der Sloot (NED)	19
14.	Eftychia Karagianni (GRE)	19

== Statistics ==
- Total goals: 1220
- Total matches: 76
- Goals per match: 16.0
- Total of scorers: 155
