= Sean Kern =

American water polo player

Personal information
- National team: USA
- Born: July 11, 1978 (age 48) Honolulu, Hawaii, United States
- Height: 195 cm (6 ft 5 in)
- Weight: 100 kg (220 lb)

Sport
- Sport: Water polo
- Position: Center Forward, Utility
- College team: University of California Los Angeles (2002)
- Club: New York Athletic Club
- Coached by: Guy Baker, Adam Krikorian (UCLA)

Sean Kern (born July 11, 1978) was an American swimmer and water polo player who has played primarily in the position of center forward (two-meter offense) and represented the United States Men's Water Polo team in the 2000 Sydney Olympics. During his water polo career, Kern was a four-time All-American, two-time National Player of the Year, two-time NCAA champion and three-time UCLA scoring leader. After his 1999 season, Kern was honored as the first-ever male recipient to receive the Peter J. Cutino Award.

Kern was born July 11, 1978, in Honolulu, Hawaii to Nancy Kern and husband. During his High School water polo career, he led Honolulu's Punahou School to three consecutive league titles and personally earned three Interscholastic League of Honolulu player of the year awards. Kern was the Interscholastic League of Honolulu (ILH) Player of the Year at Punahou, and led the school to city-wide ILH titles three times. He was an outstanding varsity swimmer, and used his state-championship backstroke in his water polo competitions, giving him the ability to focus on the ball continuously while maintaining his speed. In his Senior year, he received the C. Dudley Pratt award for his 100-yard backstroke state record.

He set the state record in the 100-yard backstroke as a senior, when he also received the C. Dudley Pratt Award.

== UCLA ==
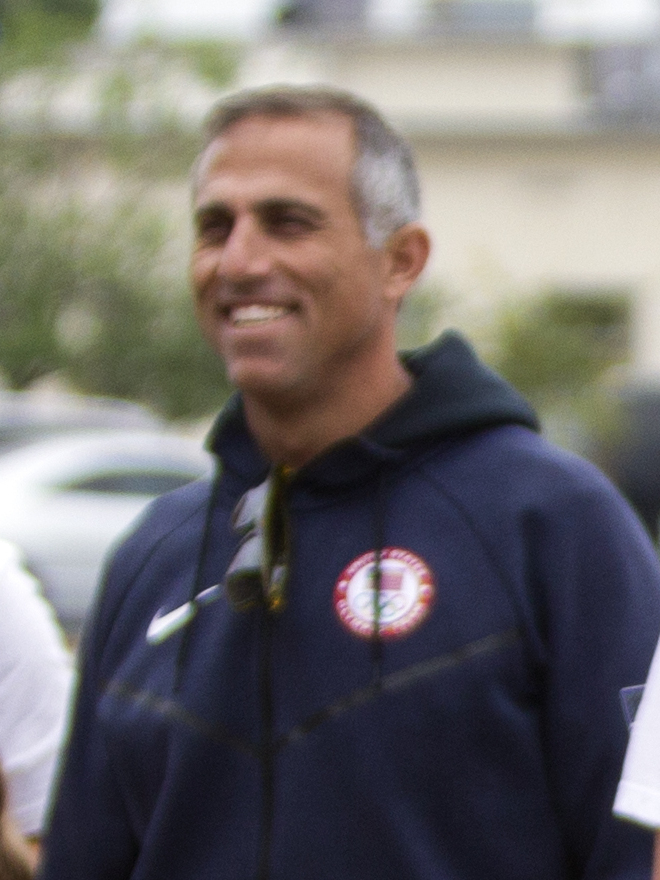
UCLA Coach Krikorian, 2018

Cutino Award trophy

Graduating in 2002, Kern came to UCLA in 1997 as the top-ranked recruit in the country. Already an established national power in Water Polo, Kern helped lead the Bruins to back-to-back NCAA titles in 1999 and 2000, while playing for USA Water Polo Hall of Fame Coach Adam Krikorian. Kern missed the first eight games of the 2000 season while playing in the Sydney Olympics, but still led the Bruins to their second consecutive NCAA championship. He scored 33 goals in 17 games, and two in the NCAA final and was named the tournament's MVP for the second year in a row. Kern, a four-time All-American, was also chosen player of the year in the Mountain Pacific Sports Federation. In his Senior Year, a UCLA teammate was Brandon Brooks, who also graduated Punahou, and would later coach the UCLA team. An essential team contributor, Kern ranked third among all UCLA Water Polo player in collegiate goals, scoring a total of with 177. In his Senior Year at UCLA, though missing ten games to attend the Olympics, he still scored 33 points with UCLA and was named both the Mountain Pacific Sports Federation and the National Player of the Year. Equally capable in his studies, Kern was the recipient of MPSF All-Academic honors from the Mountain Pacific Sports Federation and earned a Postgraduate Scholarship from the NCAA.

Kern is a two-time recipient of the Peter J. Cutino Award, receiving the top American collegiate water polo honor for the first two years that it was awarded. Kern joined other UCLA Bruins, Coralie Simmons (2001), Natalie Golda (2005) Kelly Rulon (2007), and Courtney Mathewson (2008), as the school's Peter J. Cutino Award winners, all coached by Adam Krikorian.

== 2000 Sydney Olympics ==
Often playing in the utility position, rather than his standard center-forward, Kern played for the United States Water Polo Team under Olympic Coach John Vargas in the 2000 Sydney Olympics, helping to lead the team to an overall sixth-place finish, losing their last match 10–8 to Italy. At 22, Kern was one of the youngest members of the team. He scored three goals in Olympic play, usually working in the utility position where he could play multiple positions. Kern considered his focus on strength training and squats to have aided him in Olympic play, and recognized international water polo as a more brutal physical game at times than collegiate water polo.

Kern has more recently played for the New York Athletic Club in the USA Water Polo Premier League.

=== Honors ===
In 2016, Kern was inducted into the Punahou School Hall of Fame, and became a member of the UCLA Sports Hall of Fame in 2024.
