= Heather Petri =

American water polo player (born 1978)

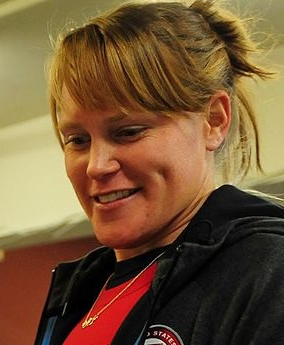
- Petri in 2013

Personal information
- Full name: Heather Danielle Petri
- Born: June 13, 1978 (age 48) Oakland, California, U.S.
- Occupation: Water Polo Coach
- Height: 180 cm (5 ft 11 in)
- Weight: 73 kg (161 lb)

Sport
- Sport: Water Polo
- Position: Perimeter Defender; Utility Player
- College team: UC Berkeley
- Club: Rari-Nantes (Italy, pro)
- Coached by: Peter Asch (Miramonte, Berkeley); Maureen O'Toole (UC Berkeley); Guy Baker (2000-2008 Olympics); Adam Krikorian ('12 Olympics)
Medal record
Women's water polo
Representing the United States
Olympic Games
Gold medal – first place	2012 London	Team competition
Silver medal – second place	2000 Sydney	Team competition
Silver medal – second place	2008 Beijing	Team competition
Bronze medal – third place	2004 Athens	Team competition
World Championships
Gold medal – first place	2003 Barcelona	Team competition
Gold medal – first place	2007 Melbourne	Team competition
Gold medal – first place	2009 Rome	Team competition
Silver medal – second place	2005 Montreal	Team competition
Pan American Games
Gold medal – first place	2011 Guadalajara	Team competition

Heather Danielle Petri (born June 13, 1978) is a former American water polo player who won the silver medal with the US women's national team at the 2000 Summer Olympics, a bronze medal at the 2004 Summer Olympics, a silver medal in Beijing in 2008 and a gold medal in London 2012. She is one of four female players who competed in water polo at four Olympics and one of two female athletes who won four Olympic medals in water polo. Her position was attacker. After he competitive water polo career, she has served as a high school and collegiate coach, most recently for her alma mater the University of California Berkeley.

Petri was born June 13, 1978 in the small town of Orinda, California outside Oakland. She began playing water polo on the boys' team in high school, but helped start a girls' water polo program at Miramonte High School where she was team captain for two years. At Miramonte, she was coached by Olympic medalist Peter Asch, who served as the head coach of the girls' team at Miramonte High School from 1995 to 1997. During Asch's tenure as coach of Miramonte, with Petri's participation, the girls's water polo teams won a North Coast section title.

== University of California Berkeley ==
In 1997 Petri was recruited by UC Berkeley coach Maureen O'Toole, where she played collegiate water polo from 1997 to 1999 and then in 2001. Petri earned All-America and All-MPSF honors at Cal in 1998 and 1999, under the continued direction of Head Coach Maureen O'Toole and Peter Asch, her former coach at Miramonte High. Petri finished UC Berkeley with 96 career goals. Pioneering women's recognition as collegiate water polo competitors, in the 1996–1997 season, Cal's women's program became a full varsity sport, transitioning from a Club team. Petri sat out her senior year at Berkeley in 1999–2000 as a member of the first US women's Olympic water polo team and graduated from Berkeley in 2002 with a degree in integrative biology. She returned to play with the Cal women's team in 2001.

Petri later played for Rari-Nantes, a professional water polo team in Florence, Italy, for the 2004–2005 and 2005–2006 seasons, and was a member of the US senior women's team.

== International competition highlights ==
In March 2007, Petri competed in the 2007 World Aquatics Championships, representing the United States. After a series of victories, the United States won the gold medal, becoming world champions. Petri also won a gold medal in the 2003 World Aquatic Championships in Barcelona, Spain and at the World Championships in 2009 in Rome, making her a three-time World Champion. At the 2005 World Championships in Montreal, she won a silver medal with the American team.

== Olympics ==
=== 2000 Sydney silver medal ===
Petri played with the U.S. women's team at the 2000 Summer Olympics in Sydney, Australia, that won the silver medal in the 2000 Olympic water polo team competition, where she was trained and mentored by Hall of Fame Olympic Head Coach Guy Baker. In the semi-finals, Australia and the U.S. team defeated Russia and the Netherlands, 7-6 and 6-5, respectively, removing them from medal contention. In the final match for the gold and silver medals, the US team were ahead 2–1 over Australia at halftime. With only 13 seconds remaining on the clock, the U.S. team scored bringing the game to a 3–3 tie, but with just 1.3 seconds left in the game, Australia scored on a penalty shot, winning the gold medal, 4-3, with the U.S. taking the silver. The Russian Federation team took the bronze.

=== 2004 Athens bronze medal ===
Again managed by Head Coach Guy Baker, Petri participated in the August, 2004 Athens Olympics, where the U.S. team won the bronze medal in the 2004 Olympic water polo team competition. In the initial semi-final match the Greek team defeated Australia 6-2, advancing to the finals. In the other semi-final match, Italy was outscored by the U.S. team, but won a close game with a score of 6-5. In the final gold and silver medal match between Italy and Greece, the teams were in a 7–7 tie at the end regular play. In the first overtime period, Greece led 9–7 in the first overtime, but Italy rebounded and captured the gold medal 10–9 in the second overtime. Australia took fourth place losing to the U.S. team in the bronze medal match. In the U.S. match for the Bronze medal against Australia on August 26, 2004, the US team won 6–5 win, but had earlier led by 4 goals, with a 5–1 lead.

=== 2008 Beijing silver medal ===
At the 2008 Summer Olympics in Beijing, China, Heather captured a team Olympic silver medal in the 2008 women's water polo competition. The women's U.S. team and the team from Hungary won successive matches in the group competition, and proceeded to the semi-final heats, with the teams from Greece and Russia having been eliminated from contending for a medal. In the quarter-final heats, the women's teams from Australia and the Netherlands advanced to the semifinal heats, beating the teams from China and Italy, respectively. In the semi-final match, the U.S. women played against Australia, and beat them by a score of 9-8. The team from the Netherlands advanced from the semi-finals to the final round by beating the team from Hungary 8-7. and in the historic final game, the American team lost 8–9 in the Championship game to the Netherlands and took home the silver medal. The team from the Netherlands took the gold, and the team from Australia took the bronze. The American women's team had yet to win the gold medal, but they would continue to improve and recruit talent, and would have greater luck in the 2012 Olympics.

=== 2012 London gold medal ===
At the 2012 London Olympics, Petri won the team gold medal under Head Coach Adam Krikorian, the first gold medal for the U.S. women's team. In the final match against the women's team from Spain, the U.S. team secured an 8–5 victory. The U.S. women had been considered one of the favored teams to medal in each Olympics since the introduction of women's water polo in 2000.

In June 2009, Petri was named to the USA water polo women's senior national team for the 2009 FINA World Championships.

After her Olympic career ended, Petri gave speeches, conducted seminars, and performed other forms of community service including work with national and world-wide charities. She supported the charity-raising efforts of Swim Across America.

== Coaching ==
Having formerly coached at Long Beach State and her alma mater Miramonte High School, she began working as a volunteer coach and then an Assistant Coach at U. Cal Berkeley beginning in 2017, and later became an Associate Head Coach under her former Olympic teammate Coralie Simmons who was Berkeley Head Coach from 2015 to 2025.

== Awards ==
In 2018, she was inducted into the USA Water Polo Hall of Fame. She became a member of the University of California Athletic Hall of Fame in 2013, and became a member of the International Swimming Hall of Fame in 2023.

== See also ==
- United States women's Olympic water polo team records and statistics
- List of multiple Olympic medalists in one event
- List of Olympic champions in women's water polo
- List of Olympic medalists in water polo (women)
- List of players who have appeared in multiple women's Olympic water polo tournaments
- List of world champions in women's water polo
- List of World Aquatics Championships medalists in water polo
