= Nicolle Payne =

American water polo player (b. 1976)

Personal information
- Born: July 15, 1976 (age 49) Paramount, California, U.S.
- Occupation(s): Water Polo Coach (UCLA, Team USA)
- Height: 175 cm (5 ft 9 in)
- Weight: 72 kg (159 lb)

Sport
- Sport: Water Polo
- Position: goalkeeper
- College team: University of California Los Angeles (1998)
- Club: New York Athletic Club
- Coached by: Victor Flynn (Gahr High School); Guy Baker (UCLA, Olympics)
Medal record
Women's water polo
Representing United States
Olympic Games
Silver medal – second place	2000 Sydney	Team competition
Bronze medal – third place	2004 Athens	Team competition
World Championships
Gold medal – first place	2003 Barcelona	Team competition

Nicolle Katherine Payne (born July 15, 1976) is an American water polo player who competed for the University of California Los Angeles. The goalkeeper was a member of the US teams that won the silver medal at the 2000 Sydney Olympics and the bronze medal at the 2004 Athens Olympics. After ending her elite competitive Water Polo career, and graduating UCLA in 1998, she coached water polo for UCLA and Team USA.

== Gahr High School ==
Payne was born July 15, 1976 in Paramount, California. She was a letterman three-years in water polo at Gahr High School in Cerritos, California where she played goalie on the boy's team and was coached by Victor Flynn. During her High School years, Payne earned first-team all-league, team MVP, and All-California Interscholastic Federation honors, and received All-American honors three times.

=== UCLA ===
Payne was the first woman recruited onto UCLA's new Title IX women's water polo team in 1994 where she was coached and trained primarily by Head Coach Guy Baker. Payne played for the Bruins as goalkeeper through 1998, serving as a team Captain each year. In the 1996 season, she recorded 175 saves and a 3.07 goals against average (GAA). She was chosen as the National Player of the Year as a freshman. Though hurt early in the 1997 season with a herniated disk and a strained vertebra, she later returned to accumulate a 4.22 GAA in 72 quarters of play. The All-American goalkeeper captained the Bruin team from 1995–1998 and was a member of three national championship teams from 1996 to 1998 led by Coach Baker. Payne finished her career at UCLA with her third national championship in 1998, with 13 saves in the final game. Her 2.77 GAA and 225 saves remain UCLA records. Payne graduated UCLA with a Biology degree in 1998.

== Olympics, 2000-2004 ==
Payne represented the United States at the 2000 Olympic water polo competition and helped the U.S. team bring home the silver medal. As goalkeeper for Team USA, she appeared in all seven games and recorded 19 saves, including eight against both Canada and Australia. At the 2000 Summer Olympics, Payne was coached by Head U.S. Olympic Water Polo team Coach Guy Baker, her coach for men's water polo team at UCLA where he had led the team to three successive national championships. In the final match, the American Women's Water Polo team led 2-1 over Australia at half-time. With only 13 seconds remaining in tournament play, American player Brenda Villa scored to cause a tie at 3-3. In the final 1.3 seconds, Australia’s Yvette Higgins scored scored, and Australia won the gold medal over the U.S. Women's team by a score of 4-3. The women's water polo team from Russia placed third for the bronze medal.

In the 2004 Olympic games in Athens, Payne was a member of the bronze medal women's water polo team that was again coached by Guy Baker, though she was not a starter in the competition.

=== International career ===
In her early career, Payne played on the 1995 U.S. Junior National Team that earned a gold medal at the Pan American Games. As a seasoned player at the 2003 FINA World Championships, her U.S. National team won the gold medal. At the 2003 Pan American Games in Santo Domingo, she was part of the U.S. team that won the gold medal in Water Polo.

=== Coaching ===
In 2001, Payne served as assistant coach for the U.S. Junior National team that won the Junior National title in a 10-9 win in overtime over Australia. In 2006, Nicolle Payne began her fourth year as assistant coach for the UCLA women's water polo program. She was previously a UCLA assistant coach in the 2005, 2002 and 2001 seasons. Though stepping down as a water polo coach for UCLA around 2013, Payne has stayed close to the game of Water Polo as a coach for Team USA, and in 2023 led the U.S. Women's Water Polo Water Team to a gold medal at the 2022 World Championships.

=== Honors ===
In February 2007, Payne was inducted into the New York Athletic Club (NYAC) Hall of Fame with fellow Olympic medalists Natalie Golda and Heather Moody. The three women were members of the bronze medal 2004 U.S. Olympic team in Athens, and are the first women added to the NYAC Hall of Fame. On October 9, 2009, Payne was inducted into the UCLA Athletics Hall of Fame. For her collegiate and post collegiate achievements in Water Polo, she was a Pacific Athletic Conference (PAC)-12 All-Century team pick.

In April 2023, Payne was inducted into the 39th annual USA Water Polo Hall of Fame. The induction was alongside another Olympic medalist, Coralie Simmons, water polo coach, Ron Richison, Olympic silver medalist Peter Varellas, and Olympic Games referee, Aaron Chaney.

== See also ==
- United States women's Olympic water polo team records and statistics
- List of Olympic medalists in water polo (women)
- List of women's Olympic water polo tournament goalkeepers
- List of world champions in women's water polo
- List of World Aquatics Championships medalists in water polo

== Sources ==
- UCLA bio (2006)
- USA Water Polo: Water Polo Olympic Medalists to be inducted into NYAC Hall of Fame.
