= Brenda Villa =

American water polo player (born 1980)

- Villa in 2026

Personal information
- National team: USA
- Born: April 18, 1980 (age 46) Los Angeles, California, U.S.
- Occupation: Water Polo Coach
- Height: 5 ft 4 in (163 cm)
- Weight: 174 lb (79 kg)

Sport
- Sport: Water Polo
- Position: Driver (Near goal posts)
- College team: Stanford University
- Club: Commerce Aquatics
- Coached by: John Tanner (Stanford); Guy Baker, A. Krikorian (Olympics)
Medal record
Women's U.S. National Water Polo Team
Representing the United States
Summer Olympics
Gold medal – first place	2012 London	Team competition
Silver medal – second place	2000 Sydney	Team competition
Silver medal – second place	2008 Beijing	Team competition
Bronze medal – third place	2004 Athens	Team competition
World Championships
Gold medal – first place	2003 Barcelona	Team competition
Gold medal – first place	2007 Melbourne	Team competition
Gold medal – first place	2009 Rome	Team competition
Silver medal – second place	2005 Montreal	Team competition
Pan American Games
Gold medal – first place	2003 Santo Domingo	Team competition
Gold medal – first place	2007 Rio de Janeiro	Team competition
Gold medal – first place	2011 Guadalajara	Team competition
FINA World Cup
Gold medal – first place	2010 Christchurch	Team competition
FINA World League
Gold medal – first place	2004 Long Beach	Team competition
Gold medal – first place	2006 Cosenza	Team competition
Gold medal – first place	2007 Montreal	Team competition
Gold medal – first place	2009 Kirishi	Team competition
Gold medal – first place	2010 La Jolla	Team competition
Gold medal – first place	2011 Tianjin	Team competition
Gold medal – first place	2012 Changshu	Team competition
Silver medal – second place	2008 Santa Cruz	Team competition

Brenda Villa (born April 18, 1980) is a highly accomplished American water polo player, who played for Stanford and won a silver medal in the 2000 Sydney Olympics, a bronze medal in the 2004 Athens Olympics, a silver medal in the 2008 Beijing Olympics, and a gold medal in the 2012 London Olympics. She is one of the most decorated athletes in the world of women’s water polo. Villa was named Female Water Polo Player of the Decade for 2000-2009 by the FINA Aquatics World Magazine. She is one of only four female players who competed in water polo at four Olympics; and one of two female athletes who won four Olympic medals in water polo. She is a leading goalscorer in Olympic water polo history, with 31 goals. In 2018, she was inducted into the International Swimming Hall of Fame and the USA Water Polo Hall of Fame.

== Early life ==
Born April 18, 1980 in greater Los Angeles, Villa grew up in Commerce, California, where she started swimming with a club team, Commerce Aquatics, at the age of six, and followed her brother into water polo when she was eight. She made the girls Junior Olympic Team while in high school. At Bell Gardens High School, Villa played with the boys' water polo team because her school did not have a girls' team, and went on to become a 4-time 1st team All-League, 4-time 1st team All-C.I.F. and 4-time All-American. In 1997, she was an All-Southern Section water polo player for Bell Gardens High.

=== Stanford University ===
Cutino trophy

Villa came to Stanford in 1998 as the program’s most heralded recruit to play for women's water polo head coach John Tanner, who would build a nationally dominant team after taking over as coach in 1998, though the Stanford women's water polo program had its inaugural year in 1993. By 2026, ten of Tanner's women's polo players and swimmers had won 17 Olympic gold medals, with 15 in water polo, and the women's team had won 10 NCAA national titles. Villa redshirted from college play in 1999 and 2000 to train for the Olympics, and after scoring 69 goals her freshman year in 2001 was named the NCAA Women’s Water Polo Player of the Year.

In the three seasons Villa played water polo for Stanford University, she scored 172 goals. Usually playing in the strong driver position, setting up on the periphery of the goal at the goal posts, she took frequent shots, moved through defensive players, and set up scoring opportunities for other players. In 2002, she led her Stanford team with 60 goals to win the NCAA Women's Water Polo Championship; they had finished second the previous season, the first year the competition was held. Villa was awarded the 2002 Peter J. Cutino Award as the top female college water polo player in the United States. As a three-time recipient of All-American honors at Stanford, Villa graduated in 2003 with a degree in political science.

== International competition highlights ==
Villa has been on Team USA since 1998. Although the shortest player on the US national women's water polo team at 5'4", Villa has been a prolific scorer at the international level. She scored 10 goals for Team USA at the 2003 Pan American Games, which qualified the team for the 2004 Summer Olympics. She had a team-high 13 goals to lead the US to gold at the 2003 FINA Water Polo World Championship. In June 2004, Villa scored the first goal in overtime, her third of the game, and another in a penalty shootout, to propel the US team past Hungary and win the gold medal at the Women's Water Polo World League Super Finals.

She was team captain of the 2005 US national team coached by two-time Olympian Heather Moody, winning a silver medal at the FINA World Championship in Montreal. In March 2007 Villa led the USA women's national water polo team in Melbourne, Australia, at the 2007 FINA World Water Polo Championships. Villa scored a total of 11 goals throughout the whole tournament helping team USA achieve first place naming them the 2007 FINA World Champions. In June 2009, Villa was named to the USA water polo women's senior national team for the 2009 FINA World Championships.

== A medal at all four Olympics from 2000-2012 ==
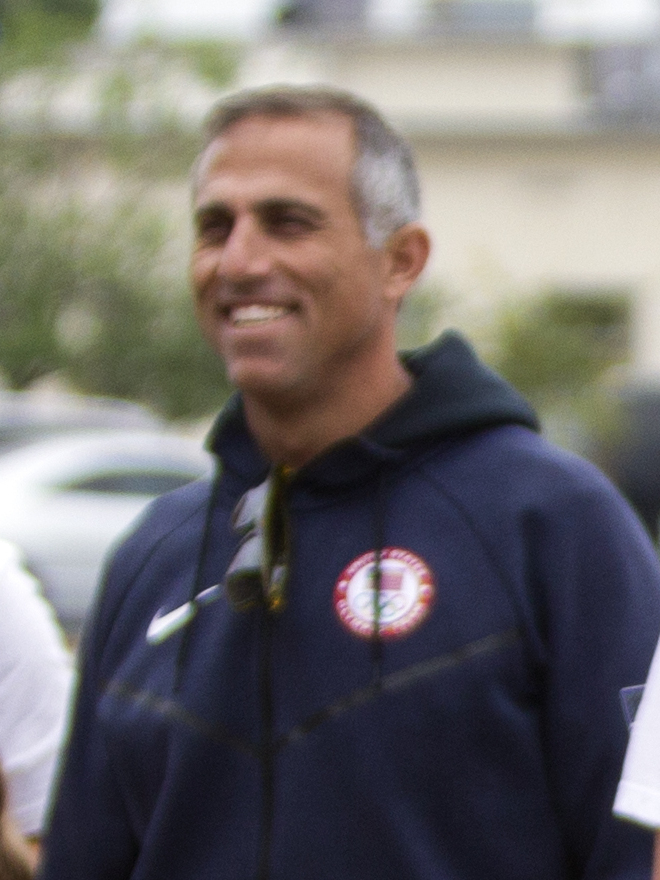
2012 Olympic Coach Krikorian

As a 20-year-old, she led the US team with nine goals at the Sydney Olympics, where the Americans took the silver medal. She was the US women's team top scorer with 7 goals in 5 games at the 2004 Athens Olympics, earning a bronze medal. In the Olympics, through 2008, she was coached by head coach Guy Baker. At the 2008 Beijing Summer Olympics, she and the American team lost 8-9 in the championship game to the Netherlands and took home the silver medal. At the 2012 London Summer Olympics, she and the American team won 8-5 in the championship game to Spain and took home the gold medal, the Americans' first gold in 4 Olympics water polo competitions. Villa captained the women's Olympic squad at both the 2008 and 2012 Olympics. Her Olympic head coaches included UCLA coach Guy Baker in 2004 and UCLA coach Adam Krikorian in 2012.

== Coaching ==
In 2005, Villa became assistant coach of the women's water polo team at Cerritos College in Norwalk, California. The Falcons ended the season with a 21-11 record, a new school record for most wins in a season. She spent five years with the Falcons and helped them to a combined 145-26 record from 2005–09, which included the team winning their only CCCAA State Championship in school history (2008). She has played professionally for the Italian power team Geymonat Orizzonte in Catania, Sicily, which won the LEN Women's Champions' Cup in 2005 and 2006. In 2010, she became the head coach at Castilleja High School for girls' water polo in Palo Alto, California. After retiring from Water Polo in 2012, Villa took up coaching water polo and swimming at a private all-girl high school.

== International competitions ==
- 1995 FINA Junior World Championships, Sainte-Foy, Canada, 3rd place
- 1997 FINA Junior World Championships, Prague, Czech Republic, 3rd place
- 1998 FINA World Championships, Perth, Australia, 8th place
- 1998 Holiday Cup, Los Alamitos, CA, 2nd place
- 1999 Holiday Cup, Los Alamitos, CA, 3rd place
- 2000 Summer Olympics, Sydney, Australia, 2nd place
- 2001 Holiday Cup, Los Alamitos, CA, 1st place
- 2001 FINA World Championships, Fukuoka, Japan, 4th place
- 2002 Holiday Cup, Palo Alto, CA, 1st place
- 2002 FINA World Cup, Perth, Australia, 2nd place
- 2003 FINA World Championships, Barcelona, Spain, 1st place
- 2003 Pan American Games, Santo Domingo, Dominican Republic, 1st place
- 2003 Holiday Cup, Los Alamitos, CA, 1st place
- 2004 FINA World League, Long Beach, USA, 1st place
- 2004 Holiday Cup, La Jolla, CA, 1st place
- 2004 Summer Olympics, Athens, Greece, 3rd place
- 2005 FINA World League, Kirishi, Russia, 5th place
- 2005 FINA World Championships, Montreal, Canada, 2nd place
- 2006 FINA World League, Cosenza, Italy, 1st place
- 2006 FINA World Cup, Tianjin, China, 4th place
- 2006 Holiday Cup, Los Alamitos, CA, 1st place
- 2007 FINA World Championships, Melbourne, Australia, 1st place
- 2007 FINA World League, Montreal, Canada, 1st place
- 2007 Holiday Cup, Long Beach, CA, 3rd place
- 2007 Pan American Games, Rio de Janeiro, Brazil, 1st place
- 2008 FINA World League, Santa Cruz de Tenerife, Spain, 2nd place
- 2008 Summer Olympics, Beijing, China, 2nd place
- 2009 FINA World League, Kirishi, Russia, 1st place
- 2009 FINA World Championships, Rome, Italy, 1st place
- 2009 Holiday Cup, Newport Beach, CA, 2nd place
- 2010 FINA World League, La Jolla, USA, 1st place
- 2010 FINA World Cup, Christchurch, New Zealand, 1st
- 2011 FINA World League, Tianjin, China, 1st place
- 2011 FINA World Championships, Shanghai, China, 6th place
- 2011 Pan American Games, Guadalajara, Mexico, 1st place
- 2012 FINA World League, Changsu, China, 1st place
- 2012 Summer Olympics, London, United Kingdom, 1st place

== See also ==
- Diversity in swimming
- List of multiple Olympic medalists in one event
- List of Olympic champions in women's water polo
- List of Olympic medalists in water polo (women)
- List of players who have appeared in multiple women's Olympic water polo tournaments
- List of women's Olympic water polo tournament top goalscorers
- List of world champions in women's water polo
- List of World Aquatics Championships medalists in water polo
- List of members of the International Swimming Hall of Fame
- United States women's Olympic water polo team records and statistics
