= Annika Dries =

American water polo player (born 1992)

Personal information
- Full name: Annika Elise Madsen Dries
- Born: February 10, 1992 (age 34) La Jolla, California, U.S.
- Height: 6 ft 1 in (1.85 m)

Sport
- Sport: Water Polo
- College team: Stanford University
- Coached by: John Tanner (Stanford); Adam Krikorian (Olympics)
Medal record
Women's water polo
Representing the United States
Olympic Games
Gold medal – first place	2012 London	Team competition
Pan American Games
Gold medal – first place	2011 Guadalajara	Team competition

Annika Elise Madsen Dries (born February 10, 1992) is a former American water polo player. She won the national championship with Stanford University in 2011, and went on to win the gold medal with the United States in the 2012 Summer Olympicsin London. In 2026, she was inducted into the USA Water Polo Hall of Fame.

== Early life ==
Dries was born February 10, 1992 in the San Diego suburb of La Jolla, to jazz pianist Eric Dries and composer Pamela Madsen. She played water polo for Laguna Beach High School in Laguna Beach, California, before graduating in 2009. She was the team's captain in her junior and senior years. She played for the U.S. junior national team in 2006 and was named a Junior Olympics All-American in 2007 and 2008.

== Stanford University ==
Dries enrolled in Stanford University and played on the water polo team in 2010 and 2011, under Head Women's Coach John Tanner. As a freshman, she was tied for third on the team with 35 goals. The following season, she led the team with 65 goals and scored five times in the national championship game against California, which Stanford won. She was named MVP of the NCAA championships, and was honored with the Peter J. Cutino Award as the nation's top female collegiate player.

Dries took a leave of absence from school in 2012 so she could train with the U.S. national water polo team.

== 2012 London Olympic gold medal ==
In 2012, Dries played in the Summer Olympics in London, England, winning the gold medal under Head Women's Olympic Water polo coach Adam Krikorian. The US women's team won the gold medal, against Spain with a score in the final match of 8-5.

== International ==
In 2010, Dries helped the U.S. win the FINA World League Super Final and the FINA World Cup, including three goals at the FINA World Super League. The following year, she scored eight goals in the Pan American Games, as the U.S. won the tournament and qualified for the 2012 Summer Olympics. The U.S. went on to win the gold medal at the Olympics, as well. She participated in two water polo world championships in 2011 and 2013.

Dries plays volleyball and tennis as recreational sports. She studied human biology at Stanford, and ha served as an advocate for breast cancer awareness and research.

== See also ==
- United States women's Olympic water polo team records and statistics
- List of Olympic champions in women's water polo
- List of Olympic medalists in water polo (women)
