= United States women's Olympic water polo team records and statistics =

This article lists various water polo records and statistics in relation to the United States women's national water polo team at the Summer Olympics.

The United States women's national water polo team has participated in 7 of 7 official women's water polo tournaments.

== Abbreviations ==
Apps	Appearances	Rk	Rank	Ref	Reference	Cap No.	Water polo cap number
Pos	Playing position	FP	Field player	GK	Goalkeeper	ISHOF	International Swimming Hall of Fame
L/R	Handedness	L	Left-handed	R	Right-handed	Oly debut	Olympic debut in water polo
(C)	Captain	p.	page	pp.	pages		

== Team statistics ==
=== Comprehensive results by tournament ===
Note: Results of Olympic qualification tournaments are not included. Last updated: 11 August 2021.

Legend

- 1st – Champions
- 2nd – Runners-up
- 3rd – Third place
- 4th – Fourth place
- Q – Qualified for forthcoming tournament
- – Hosts

Women's team	2000	2004	2008	2012	2016	2020	2024	Years
United States	2nd	3rd	2nd	1st	1st	1st	4th	7
Total teams	6	8	8	8	8	10	10	

=== Number of appearances ===
Last updated: 11 August 2024.

Legend

- Year^{*} – As host team

Women's team	Apps	Record streak	Active streak	Debut	Most recent	Best finish	Confederation
United States	7	7	7	2000	2024	Champions	Americas – UANA

=== Best finishes ===
Last updated: 11 August 2021.

Legend

- Year^{*} – As host team

Women's team	Best finish	Apps	Confederation
United States	Champions (2012, 2016, 2020)	7	Americas – UANA

=== Finishes in the top four ===
Last updated: 11 August 2021.

Legend

- Year^{*} – As host team

Women's team	Total	Champions	Runners-up	Third place	Fourth place	First	Last
United States	7	3 (2012, 2016, 2020)	2 (2000, 2008)	1 (2004)	1 (2024)	2000	2024

=== Medal table ===
Last updated: 11 August 2021.

Women's team	Gold	Silver	Bronze	Total
United States (USA)	3	2	1	6

== Player statistics ==
=== Multiple appearances ===
The following table is pre-sorted by number of Olympic appearances (in descending order), year of the last Olympic appearance (in ascending order), year of the first Olympic appearance (in ascending order), date of birth (in ascending order), name of the player (in ascending order), respectively.

- Number of five-time Olympians: 0
- Number of four-time Olympians: 2
- Number of three-time Olympians: 1
- Last updated: 26 July 2021.

Legend

- – Hosts

Female athletes who competed in water polo at three or more Olympics
Apps	Player	Birth	Pos	Water polo tournaments					Age of first/last	ISHOF member	Note	Ref
Apps	Player	Birth	Pos	1	2	3	4	5	Age of first/last	ISHOF member	Note	Ref
4	Heather Petri	1978	FP	2000	2004	2008	2012		22/34			
4	Brenda Villa	1980	FP	2000	2004	2008	2012		20/32	2018		
3	Kami Craig	1987	FP	2008	2012	2016			21/29			

=== Multiple medalists ===
The following table is pre-sorted by total number of Olympic medals (in descending order), number of Olympic gold medals (in descending order), number of Olympic silver medals (in descending order), year of receiving the last Olympic medal (in ascending order), year of receiving the first Olympic medal (in ascending order), name of the player (in ascending order), respectively.

- Number of four-time Olympic medalists: 2
- Number of three-time Olympic medalists: 3
- Number of two-time Olympic medalists: 18
- Last updated: 10 August 2021.

Legend

- – Hosts

Female athletes who won two or more Olympic medals in water polo
Rk	Player	Birth	Height	Pos	Water polo tournaments					Period (age of first/last)	Medals				Ref
Rk	Player	Birth	Height	Pos	1	2	3	4	5	Period (age of first/last)	G	S	B	T	Ref
1	Heather Petri	1978	1.80 m (5 ft 11 in)	FP	2000	2004	2008	2012		12 years (22/34)	1	2	1	4	
1	Brenda Villa	1980	1.63 m (5 ft 4 in)	FP	2000	2004	2008	2012		12 years (20/32)	1	2	1	4	
3	Melissa Seidemann	1990	1.83 m (6 ft 0 in)	FP	2012	2016	2020			9 years (22/31)	3	0	0	3	
3	Maggie Steffens	1993	1.73 m (5 ft 8 in)	FP	2012	2016	2020			9 years (19/28)	3	0	0	3	
5	Kami Craig	1987	1.81 m (5 ft 11 in)	FP	2008	2012	2016			8 years (21/29)	2	1	0	3	
6	Courtney Mathewson	1986	1.71 m (5 ft 7 in)	FP	2012	2016				4 years (25/29)	2	0	0	2	
6	Rachel Fattal	1993	1.73 m (5 ft 8 in)	FP	2016	2020				5 years (22/27)	2	0	0	2	
6	Aria Fischer	1999	1.83 m (6 ft 0 in)	FP	2016	2020				5 years (17/22)	2	0	0	2	
6	Makenzie Fischer	1997	1.85 m (6 ft 1 in)	FP	2016	2020				5 years (19/24)	2	0	0	2	
6	Kaleigh Gilchrist	1992	1.75 m (5 ft 9 in)	FP	2016	2020				5 years (24/29)	2	0	0	2	
6	Ashleigh Johnson	1994	1.85 m (6 ft 1 in)	GK	2016	2020				5 years (21/26)	2	0	0	2	
6	Maddie Musselman	1998	1.80 m (5 ft 11 in)	FP	2016	2020				5 years (18/23)	2	0	0	2	
13	Elizabeth Armstrong	1983	1.88 m (6 ft 2 in)	GK	2008	2012				4 years (25/29)	1	1	0	2	
13	Jessica Steffens	1987	1.83 m (6 ft 0 in)	FP	2008	2012				4 years (21/25)	1	1	0	2	
13	Lauren Wenger	1984	1.91 m (6 ft 3 in)	FP	2008	2012				4 years (24/28)	1	1	0	2	
13	Elsie Windes	1985	1.78 m (5 ft 10 in)	FP	2008	2012				4 years (23/27)	1	1	0	2	
17	Kelly Rulon	1984	1.78 m (5 ft 10 in)	FP	2004		2012			8 years (20/27)	1	0	1	2	
18	Robin Beauregard	1979	1.75 m (5 ft 9 in)	FP	2000	2004				4 years (21/25)	0	1	1	2	
18	Ellen Estes	1978	1.82 m (6 ft 0 in)	FP	2000	2004				4 years (21/25)	0	1	1	2	
18	Ericka Lorenz	1981	1.80 m (5 ft 11 in)	FP	2000	2004				4 years (19/23)	0	1	1	2	
18	Heather Moody	1973	1.82 m (6 ft 0 in)	FP	2000	2004				4 years (27/31)	0	1	1	2	
18	Nicolle Payne	1976	1.75 m (5 ft 9 in)	GK	2000	2004				4 years (24/28)	0	1	1	2	
18	Natalie Golda	1981	1.80 m (5 ft 11 in)	FP	2004	2008				4 years (22/26)	0	1	1	2	
Rk	Player	Birth	Height	Pos	1	2	3	4	5	Period (age of first/last)	G	S	B	T	Ref
Rk	Player	Birth	Height	Pos	Water polo tournaments					Period (age of first/last)	Medals				Ref

=== Top goalscorers ===
The following table is pre-sorted by number of total goals (in descending order), year of the last Olympic appearance (in ascending order), year of the first Olympic appearance (in ascending order), name of the player (in ascending order), respectively.

- Number of goalscorers (40+ goals): 1
- Number of goalscorers (30–39 goals): 2
- Number of goalscorers (20–29 goals): 1
- Last updated: 12 August 2021.

Legend

- – Hosts

Female players with 20 or more goals at the Olympics
Rk	Player	Birth	L/R	Total goals	Water polo tournaments (goals)					Age of first/last	ISHOF member	Note	Ref
Rk	Player	Birth	L/R	Total goals	1	2	3	4	5	Age of first/last	ISHOF member	Note	Ref
1	Maggie Steffens	1993	Right	56	2012 (21)	2016 (17)	2020 (18)			19/28			
2	Brenda Villa	1980	Right	31	2000 (9)	2004 (7)	2008 (9)	2012 (6)		20/32	2018		
3	Maddie Musselman	1998	Right	30	2016 (12)	2020 (18)				18/23			
4	Makenzie Fischer	1997	Right	21	2016 (7)	2020 (14)				19/24			

- Official Results Books (PDF): 2000 (p. 101), 2004 (pp. 84–85), 2008 (pp. 77–78), 2012 (pp. 368–369), 2016 (pp. 218–219), 2020 (pp. 273–274).

=== Goalkeepers ===
The following table is pre-sorted by edition of the Olympics (in ascending order), cap number or name of the goalkeeper (in ascending order), respectively.

Last updated: 1 April 2021.

Legend and abbreviation

- – Hosts
- Eff % – Save efficiency (Saves / Shots)

Year	Cap No.	Goalkeeper	Birth	Age	Saves	Shots	Eff %	ISHOF member	Note	Ref
2000	1	Bernice Orwig	1976	23	39	59	66.1%			
2000	11	Nicolle Payne	1976	24	19	38	50.0%			
2004	1	Jacqueline Frank	1980	24	41	68	60.3%		Starting goalkeeper	
2004	12	Nicolle Payne (2)	1976	28	0	0	—			
2008	1	Elizabeth Armstrong	1983	25	49	92	53.3%		Starting goalkeeper	
2008	13	Jaime Komer	1981	26	1	2	50.0%			
2012	1	Elizabeth Armstrong (2)	1983	29	53	101	52.5%		Starting goalkeeper	
2012	13	Tumua Anae	1988	23	0	0	—			
2016	1	Samantha Hill	1992	24	6	10	60.0%			
2016	13	Ashleigh Johnson	1994	21	51	79	64.6%		Starting goalkeeper	
Year	Cap No.	Goalkeeper	Birth	Age	Saves	Shots	Eff %	ISHOF member	Note	Ref

- Official Results Books (PDF): 2000 (p. 101), 2004 (pp. 84–85), 2008 (pp. 77–78), 2012 (pp. 368–369), 2016 (pp. 218–219).

=== Top sprinters ===
The following table is pre-sorted by number of total sprints won (in descending order), year of the last Olympic appearance (in ascending order), year of the first Olympic appearance (in ascending order), name of the sprinter (in ascending order), respectively.

* Number of sprinters (30+ sprints won): 0

- Number of sprinters (20–29 sprints won): 0
- Number of sprinters (10–19 sprints won): 2
- Number of sprinters (5–9 sprints won): 1
- Last updated: 15 May 2021.

Legend and abbreviation

- – Hosts
- Eff % – Efficiency (Sprints won / Sprints contested)

Female players with 5 or more sprints won at the Olympics
Rk	Sprinter	Birth	Total sprints won	Total sprints contested	Eff %	Water polo tournaments (sprints won / contested)					Age of first/last	ISHOF member	Note	Ref
Rk	Sprinter	Birth	Total sprints won	Total sprints contested	Eff %	1	2	3	4	5	Age of first/last	ISHOF member	Note	Ref
1	Rachel Fattal	1993	17	23	73.9%	2016 (17/23)					22/22			
2	Heather Petri	1978	13	18	72.2%	2000 (1/1)	2004 (0/0)	2008 (11/15)	2012 (1/2)		22/34			
3	Margaret Dingeldein	1980	5	5	100.0%	2004 (5/5)					24/24			

- Official Results Books (PDF): 2000 (p. 101), 2004 (pp. 84–85), 2008 (pp. 77–78), 2012 (pp. 368–369), 2016 (pp. 218–219).

== Coach statistics ==
=== Most successful coaches ===
The following table is pre-sorted by total number of Olympic medals (in descending order), number of Olympic gold medals (in descending order), number of Olympic silver medals (in descending order), year of winning the last Olympic medal (in ascending order), year of winning the first Olympic medal (in ascending order), name of the coach (in ascending order), respectively. Last updated: 5 May 2021.

Guy Baker guided the United States women's team to three Olympic medals in a row between 2000 and 2008.

Adam Krikorian coached the United States women's national team to two consecutive Olympic gold medals in 2012 and 2016.

Legend

- – Hosts

Head coaches who led women's national teams to win two or more Olympic medals
Rk	Head coach	Nationality	Birth	Age	Women's team	Tournaments (finish)			Period	Medals				Ref
Rk	Head coach	Nationality	Birth	Age	Women's team	1	2	3	Period	G	S	B	T	Ref
1	Guy Baker	United States			United States	2000 (2nd)	2004 (3rd)	2008 (2nd)	8 years	0	2	1	3	
2	Adam Krikorian	United States	1974	38–42	United States	2012 (1st)	2016 (1st)		4 years	2	0	0	2	

== Olympic champions ==
=== 2012 Summer Olympics ===
- Edition of women's tournament: 4th
- Host city: London, United Kingdom
- Number of participating teams: 8
- Competition format: Round-robin pools advanced teams to classification matches
- Champion: United States (1st title; 2nd place in preliminary A group)

Match	Round	Date	Cap color	Opponent	Result	Goals for	Goals against	Goals diff.
Match 1/6	Preliminary round – Group A	30 July 2012	Blue	Hungary	Won	14	13	1
Match 2/6	Preliminary round – Group A	1 August 2012	Blue	Spain	Drawn	9	9	0
Match 3/6	Preliminary round – Group A	3 August 2012	Blue	China	Won	7	6	1
Match 4/6	Quarter-finals	5 August 2012	White	Italy	Won	9	6	3
Match 5/6	Semi-finals	7 August 2012	White	Australia	Won	11	9	2
Match 6/6	Gold medal match	9 August 2012	White	Spain	Won	8	5	3
Total	Matches played: 6 • Wins: 5 • Ties: 1 • Defeats: 0 • Win %: 83.3%					58	48	10

Source: Official Results Books (PDF): 2012 (pp. 294, 300, 310, 312, 324, 334).

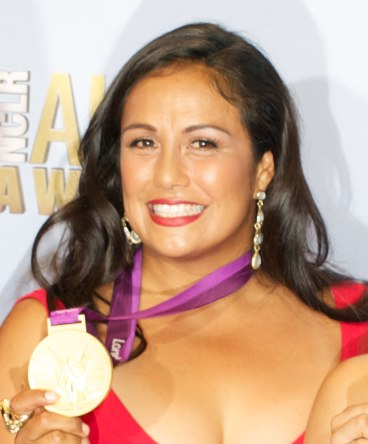
Brenda Villa was the captain of the United States at the 2012 Olympics.

- Head coach: (United States) Adam Krikorian (1st title as head coach)
- Assistant coaches: (United States) Heather Moody, (United States) Daniel Klatt

Roster
Cap No.	Player	Pos	L/R	Height	Weight	Date of birth	Age of winning gold	Oly debut	ISHOF member
1	Elizabeth Armstrong	GK	R	1.88 m (6 ft 2 in)	77 kg (170 lb)	31 January 1983	29 years, 191 days	No	
2	Heather Petri	FP	R	1.80 m (5 ft 11 in)	73 kg (161 lb)	13 June 1978	34 years, 57 days	No	
3	Melissa Seidemann	FP	R	1.83 m (6 ft 0 in)	104 kg (229 lb)	26 June 1990	22 years, 44 days	Yes	
4	Brenda Villa (C)	FP	R	1.63 m (5 ft 4 in)	79 kg (174 lb)	18 April 1980	32 years, 113 days	No	2018
5	Lauren Wenger	FP	R	1.91 m (6 ft 3 in)	77 kg (170 lb)	11 March 1984	28 years, 151 days	No	
6	Maggie Steffens	FP	R	1.73 m (5 ft 8 in)	70 kg (154 lb)	4 June 1993	19 years, 66 days	Yes	
7	Courtney Mathewson	FP	R	1.71 m (5 ft 7 in)	71 kg (157 lb)	14 September 1986	25 years, 330 days	Yes	
8	Jessica Steffens	FP	R	1.83 m (6 ft 0 in)	75 kg (165 lb)	7 April 1987	25 years, 124 days	No	
9	Elsie Windes	FP	R	1.78 m (5 ft 10 in)	70 kg (154 lb)	17 June 1985	27 years, 53 days	No	
10	Kelly Rulon	FP	R	1.78 m (5 ft 10 in)	61 kg (134 lb)	16 August 1984	27 years, 359 days	No	
11	Annika Dries	FP	R	1.85 m (6 ft 1 in)	88 kg (194 lb)	10 February 1992	20 years, 181 days	Yes	
12	Kami Craig	FP	R	1.81 m (5 ft 11 in)	88 kg (194 lb)	21 July 1987	25 years, 19 days	No	
13	Tumua Anae	GK	R	1.80 m (5 ft 11 in)	70 kg (154 lb)	16 October 1988	23 years, 298 days	Yes	
Average				1.80 m (5 ft 11 in)	77 kg (170 lb)	5 May 1986	26 years, 96 days		
Coach	Adam Krikorian					22 July 1974	38 years, 18 days		

Note: Jessica Steffens and Maggie Steffens are sisters.
Sources:

- Official Results Books (PDF): 2012 (p. 369);
- ISHOF.

Abbreviation

- MP – Matches played
- Min – Minutes
- G – Goals
- Sh – Shots
- AS – Assists
- TF – Turnover fouls
- ST – Steals
- BL – Blocked shots
- SP – Sprints
- 20S – 20 seconds exclusion
- DE – Double exclusion
- Pen – Penalty
- EX – Exclusion

Statistics
Cap No.	Player	Pos	MP	Minutes played		Goals/Shots			AS	TF	ST	BL	Sprints			Personal fouls			
Cap No.	Player	Pos	MP	Min	%	G	Sh	%	AS	TF	ST	BL	Won	SP	%	20S	DE	Pen	EX
1	Elizabeth Armstrong	GK	6	198	100%					1									
2	Heather Petri	FP	6	61	30.8%	1	12	8.3%	2	3		1	1	2	50.0%	2			
3	Melissa Seidemann	FP	6	95	48.0%	7	20	35.0%	1	5	1	1				8	2	1	2
4	Brenda Villa (C)	FP	6	153	77.3%	6	24	25.0%	12	4	4	5				2	1		
5	Lauren Wenger	FP	6	161	81.3%	2	11	18.2%	6	8	4	10	1	13	7.7%	2			
6	Maggie Steffens	FP	6	157	79.3%	21	27	77.8%	8	8	10	2				7		3	
7	Courtney Mathewson	FP	6	95	48.0%	7	21	33.3%		1	4	1				1			
8	Jessica Steffens	FP	6	83	41.9%	1	4	25.0%	2	6	2	2				14		1	3
9	Elsie Windes	FP	6	98	49.5%	1	8	12.5%	5	6	2	3				11		3	3
10	Kelly Rulon	FP	6	112	56.6%	4	12	33.3%	5	5	1	1	4	11	36.4%	2			
11	Annika Dries	FP	6	65	32.8%	2	5	40.0%	1	11	1	2				2			
12	Kami Craig	FP	6	108	54.5%	6	9	66.7%	2	17	2	1				2			
13	Tumua Anae	GK	6	0	0.0%														
Team										7									
Total			6	198	100%	58	153	37.9%	44	82	31	29	6	26	23.1%	53	3	8	8
Against						48	184	26.1%	31	65	42	14	20	26	76.9%	61	3	4	4

Cap No.	Player	Pos	Saves/Shots		
Cap No.	Player	Pos	Saves	Shots	%
1	Elizabeth Armstrong	GK	53	101	52.5%
13	Tumua Anae	GK			
Total			53	101	52.5%

Source: Official Results Books (PDF): 2012 (p. 368).

=== 2016 Summer Olympics ===
- Edition of women's tournament: 5th
- Host city: Rio de Janeiro, Brazil
- Number of participating teams: 8
- Competition format: Round-robin pools advanced teams to classification matches
- Champion: United States (2nd title; 1st place in preliminary B group)

Match	Round	Date	Cap color	Opponent	Result	Goals for	Goals against	Goals diff.
Match 1/6	Preliminary round – Group B	9 August 2016	Blue	Spain	Won	11	4	7
Match 2/6	Preliminary round – Group B	11 August 2016	Blue	China	Won	12	4	8
Match 3/6	Preliminary round – Group B	13 August 2016	Blue	Hungary	Won	11	6	5
Match 4/6	Quarter-finals	15 August 2016	Blue	Brazil	Won	13	3	10
Match 5/6	Semi-finals	17 August 2016	Blue	Hungary	Won	14	10	4
Match 6/6	Gold medal match	19 August 2016	White	Italy	Won	12	5	7
Total	Matches played: 6 • Wins: 6 • Ties: 0 • Defeats: 0 • Win %: 100%					73	32	41

Source: Official Results Books (PDF): 2016 (pp. 142, 148, 158, 168, 176, 184).

- Head coach: (United States) Adam Krikorian (2nd title as head coach)
- Assistant coaches: (United States) Daniel Klatt, (United States) Chris Oeding

Roster
Cap No.	Player	Pos	L/R	Height	Weight	Date of birth	Age of winning gold	Oly debut	ISHOF member
1	Samantha Hill	GK	R	1.83 m (6 ft 0 in)	89 kg (196 lb)	8 June 1992	24 years, 72 days	Yes	
2	Maddie Musselman	FP	R	1.81 m (5 ft 11 in)	65 kg (143 lb)	16 June 1998	18 years, 64 days	Yes	
3	Melissa Seidemann	FP	R	1.83 m (6 ft 0 in)	104 kg (229 lb)	26 June 1990	26 years, 54 days	No	
4	Rachel Fattal	FP	R	1.73 m (5 ft 8 in)	65 kg (143 lb)	10 December 1993	22 years, 253 days	Yes	
5	Caroline Clark	FP	R	1.88 m (6 ft 2 in)	72 kg (159 lb)	28 June 1990	26 years, 52 days	Yes	
6	Maggie Steffens (C)	FP	R	1.73 m (5 ft 8 in)	74 kg (163 lb)	4 June 1993	23 years, 76 days	No	
7	Courtney Mathewson	FP	R	1.71 m (5 ft 7 in)	69 kg (152 lb)	14 September 1986	29 years, 340 days	No	
8	Kiley Neushul	FP	R	1.73 m (5 ft 8 in)	65 kg (143 lb)	5 March 1993	23 years, 167 days	Yes	
9	Aria Fischer	FP	R	1.83 m (6 ft 0 in)	78 kg (172 lb)	2 March 1999	17 years, 170 days	Yes	
10	Kaleigh Gilchrist	FP	R	1.76 m (5 ft 9 in)	77 kg (170 lb)	16 May 1992	24 years, 95 days	Yes	
11	Makenzie Fischer	FP	R	1.86 m (6 ft 1 in)	74 kg (163 lb)	29 March 1997	19 years, 143 days	Yes	
12	Kami Craig	FP	R	1.81 m (5 ft 11 in)	88 kg (194 lb)	21 July 1987	29 years, 29 days	No	
13	Ashleigh Johnson	GK	R	1.86 m (6 ft 1 in)	81 kg (179 lb)	12 September 1994	21 years, 342 days	Yes	
Average				1.80 m (5 ft 11 in)	77 kg (170 lb)	1 February 1993	23 years, 200 days		
Coach	Adam Krikorian					22 July 1974	42 years, 28 days		

Note: Aria Fischer and Makenzie Fischer are sisters.
Sources:

- Official Results Books (PDF): 2016 (p. 219);
- ISHOF.

Abbreviation

- MP – Matches played
- Min – Minutes
- G – Goals
- Sh – Shots
- AS – Assists
- TF – Turnover fouls
- ST – Steals
- BL – Blocked shots
- SP – Sprints
- 20S – 20 seconds exclusion
- DE – Double exclusion
- Pen – Penalty
- EX – Exclusion

Statistics
Cap No.	Player	Pos	MP	Minutes played		Goals/Shots			AS	TF	ST	BL	Sprints			Personal fouls			
Cap No.	Player	Pos	MP	Min	%	G	Sh	%	AS	TF	ST	BL	Won	SP	%	20S	DE	Pen	EX
1	Samantha Hill	GK	6	15	7.8%														
2	Maddie Musselman	FP	6	116	60.4%	12	25	48.0%		7	4	3				4	1		
3	Melissa Seidemann	FP	6	95	49.5%	3	11	27.3%	1	8	3	2				5			
4	Rachel Fattal	FP	6	146	76.0%	4	14	28.6%	5	8	9	3	17	23	73.9%	2			
5	Caroline Clark	FP	6	62	32.3%	2	6	33.3%	1	1	4					6			
6	Maggie Steffens (C)	FP	6	145	75.5%	17	24	70.8%	5	9	1	3	1	1	100%	6		1	1
7	Courtney Mathewson	FP	6	96	50.0%	7	11	63.6%	4	1	1	1							
8	Kiley Neushul	FP	6	149	77.6%	10	20	50.0%	2	7	5	1				1			
9	Aria Fischer	FP	6	69	35.9%	0	5	0.0%		5	1	1				2			
10	Kaleigh Gilchrist	FP	6	99	51.6%	6	13	46.2%	5	5	2	5				3		1	
11	Makenzie Fischer	FP	6	95	49.5%	7	23	30.4%	4	5	3	1				8		1	1
12	Kami Craig	FP	6	81	42.2%	5	7	71.4%	1	4	3	1				2			
13	Ashleigh Johnson	GK	6	177	92.2%	0	4	0.0%	3	2	17								
Team										16									
Total			6	192	100%	73	163	44.8%	31	78	53	21	18	24	75.0%	39	1	3	2
Against						32	156	20.5%	13	90	41	8	6	24	25.0%	40	1	5	0

Cap No.	Player	Pos	Saves/Shots		
Cap No.	Player	Pos	Saves	Shots	%
1	Samantha Hill	GK	6	10	60.0%
13	Ashleigh Johnson	GK	51	79	64.6%
Total			57	89	64.0%

Source: Official Results Books (PDF): 2016 (p. 218).

== See also ==
- United States men's Olympic water polo team records and statistics
- List of women's Olympic water polo tournament records and statistics
- Lists of Olympic water polo records and statistics
- United States at the Summer Olympics

== Sources ==
=== Official Results Books (IOC) ===
PDF documents in the LA84 Foundation Digital Library:

- Official Results Book – 2000 Olympic Games – Water Polo (download, archive)
- Official Results Book – 2004 Olympic Games – Water Polo (download, archive)
- Official Results Book – 2008 Olympic Games – Water Polo (download, archive)

PDF documents on the FINA website:

- Official Results Book – 2012 Olympic Games – Diving, Swimming, Synchronised Swimming, Water Polo (archive) (pp. 284–507)

PDF documents in the Olympic World Library:

- Official Results Book – 2016 Olympic Games – Water Polo (archive)

PDF documents on the International Olympic Committee website:

- Official Results Book – 2020 Olympic Games – Water Polo (archive)
- Official Results Book – 2024 Olympic Games – Water Polo

=== Official Reports (FINA) ===
PDF documents on the FINA website:

- HistoFINA – Water polo medalists and statistics (as of September 2019) (archive) (p. 56)
- 1870–2020 | 150 years of Water Polo – Evolution of its rules (archive)

=== Official website (IOC) ===
Water polo on the International Olympic Committee website:

- Water polo
- Women's water polo

=== Olympedia ===
Water polo on the Olympedia website:

- Water polo
- Women's water polo
- Athlete count for water polo
- Water polo venues
- Water polo at the 2000 Summer Olympics (women's tournament)
- Water polo at the 2004 Summer Olympics (women's tournament)
- Water polo at the 2008 Summer Olympics (women's tournament)
- Water polo at the 2012 Summer Olympics (women's tournament)
- Water polo at the 2016 Summer Olympics (women's tournament)
- Water polo at the 2020 Summer Olympics (women's tournament)

=== Sports Reference ===
Water polo on the Sports Reference website:

- Country Medal Leaders & Athlete Medal Leaders (1900–2016) (archived)
- Women's water polo (2000–2016) (archived)
- Water polo at the 2000 Summer Games (women's tournament) (archived)
- Water polo at the 2004 Summer Games (women's tournament) (archived)
- Water polo at the 2008 Summer Games (women's tournament) (archived)
- Water polo at the 2012 Summer Games (women's tournament) (archived)
- Water polo at the 2016 Summer Games (women's tournament) (archived)

=== Todor66 ===
Water polo on the Todor66 website:

- Water polo at the Summer Games
- Water polo at the 2000 Summer Olympics (women's tournament, women's qualification)
- Water polo at the 2004 Summer Olympics (women's tournament, women's qualification)
- Water polo at the 2008 Summer Olympics (women's tournament, women's qualification)
- Water polo at the 2012 Summer Olympics (women's tournament, women's qualification)
- Water polo at the 2016 Summer Olympics (women's tournament, women's qualification)
- Water polo at the 2020 Summer Olympics (women's tournament, women's qualification)

=== ISHOF ===
International Swimming Hall of Fame (ISHOF) website:

- Honorees Listed by Category – Water Polo
- Honorees Listed by Category – Coaches
- Honorees Listed by Category – Contributors
- Honorees by Country
- Honorees By Last Name
