= Bernice Orwig =

American water polo player (born 1976)

Personal information
- Full name: Bernice Jane Orwig
- National team: USA
- Born: November 24, 1976 (age 49) Anaheim, California, U.S.
- Occupations: Water Polo Coach * U Cal Berkeley * University of Michigan * USC
- Height: 182 cm (6 ft 0 in)
- Weight: 77 kg (170 lb)

Sport
- Country: United States
- Sport: Water polo
- Position: Goaltender
- College team: University of Southern California
- Coached by: Jojan Vavic (USC); Guy Baker (Olympics)
Medal record
Olympic Games
Silver medal – second place	2000 Sydney	Team competition

Bernice Jane Orwig (born November 24, 1976) is an American water polo goalkeeper who competed for USC and won a silver medal at the 2000 Summer Olympics. She has since served as a Water Polo coach for University of California, Berkeley, the University of Michigan, and her alma mater, USC.

== Early career ==
Bernice graduated from Savanna High School in Anaheim, California, in June 1994. There she began her career in water polo playing as goalie for the Savanna Rebel Water Polo team.

== Cypress College ==
Following high school, Orwig enrolled at Cypress College in Cypress, California. In 1995-1996, she played as a goalkeeper on the men's team because there was no women's team. As a result of her play at Cypress College, she was recruited by four year institutions. In 2024, Orwig was selected for induction into the California Community College Athletic Association (3C2A) Hall of Fame.

== University of Southern California ==
Orwig attended and played Water Polo for USC, under Coach Jojan Vavic, graduating with a degree in Social Science Education in 1999. As a senior, she helped lead USC to the 1999 NCAA Collegiate title, in an exciting game over the women from Stanford University that included five overtime sessions. That same year, she won the Peter J. Cutino Award as the top female college water polo player in the United States. She received first team All-America honors in 1999 and second team All-America honors during her sophomore and junior year.

=== 2000 Sydney Olympics ===
Orwig participated in the 2000 Olympics under U.S. Olympic Women's Head Coach Guy Baker, serving as the team's starting goaltender. In the Olympic preliminary rounds, known as the Round Robin, eliminated Kazakhstan and Canada, seeing Australia win four of five games, and capturing the first place standing into the semi-finals. The semi-final rounds were all close, usually decided by only one goal. Australia and the United States defeated Russia and the Women's team from the Netherlands, with the final match seeing USA leading Australia 2-1 at halftime . With only 13 seconds left in the second half, the Americas tied the match 3-3, but with only 1.3 seconds remaining Australia’s Yvette Higgins scored giving Australia the gold medal, 4-3.

== Coaching water polo ==
In addition to her career as a player, Orwig is also a water polo coach. In March 2005, she was named as an assistant coach for the USA National Team. In January 2005, Orwig coached the Junior National Team. The team won the gold medal at the 2005 Junior World Championships. In 2005, after her competitive water polo career, she became an assistant coach of the women's water polo team at Golden West College in Huntington Beach, California, and helped coach them to a state championship in 2009.She has also served as an assistant coach for the University of California, Berkeley, the University of Michigan, and USC.

== See also ==
- United States women's Olympic water polo team records and statistics
- List of Olympic medalists in water polo (women)
- List of women's Olympic water polo tournament goalkeepers
