= Kelly Rulon =

American water polo player (born 1984)

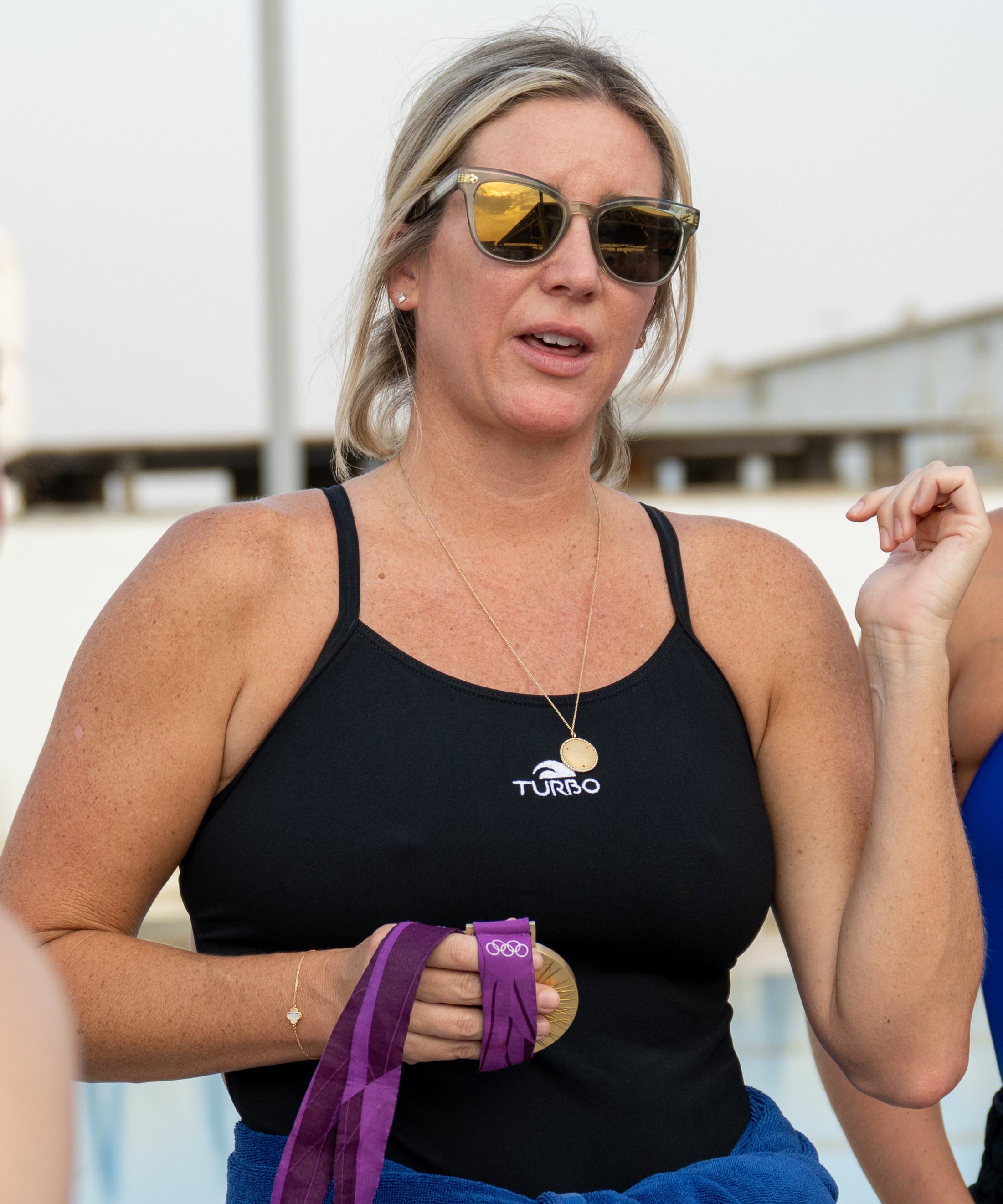
- Rulon in 2024

Personal information
- Full name: Kelly Kristen Rulon
- Born: August 16, 1984 (age 41) San Diego, California, U.S.
- Height: 178 cm (5 ft 10 in)
- Weight: 61 kg (134 lb)

Sport
- College team: University of California, Los Angeles
- Club: San Diego Shores (High School)
- Coached by: Adam Krikorian UCLA; Guy Baker, A. Krikorian (Olympics)
Medal record
Women's water polo
Representing the United States
Olympic Games
Gold medal – first place	2012 London	Team competition
Bronze medal – third place	2004 Athens	Team competition
World Championships
Gold medal – first place	2009 Rome	Team competition
Silver medal – second place	2005 Montréal	Team competition
World Cup
Gold medal – first place	2010 Christchurch	Team competition
Pan American Games
Gold medal – first place	2011 Guadalajara	Team competition

Kelly Kristen Rulon (born August 16, 1984) is an American water polo player, who competed for the University of California Los Angeles, and won a gold medal with the United States Women's Water Polo team in London at the 2012 London Olympics in water polo, and a bronze medal with the women's team at the 2004 Summer Olympics in Athens, again in the water polo competition. Her primary water polo position was driver, a high scoring position that lined up around the goal post, at the close periphery of the goal, and frequently assisted other player in taking shots on goal.

== Early life ==
Rulon was born August 16, 1984 greater San Diego, California and grew up in greater San Diego's Point Loma. Playing under Coaches Greg Ormsby, and Douglas Peabody at the University of San Diego High School, also known as Cathedral Catholic High School, she was a four-time first-team all-league, all-city and All-California Interscholastic Federation selection, as well as Most Valuable Player of her team each year she played. In club team competition, Kelly competed for the San Diego Shores club team. Around age 15, at the 1999 Junior Olympics, she was a recipient of MVP honors. She was an All-America first team honors recipient at the Junior Olympics five times.

== UCLA ==
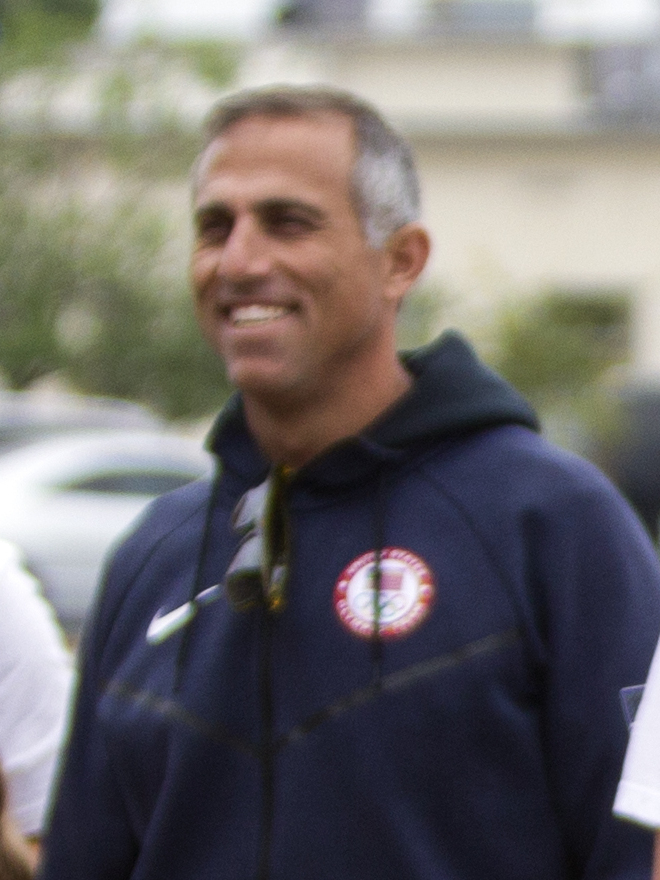
UCLA Coach Krikorian, 2018

As a freshman at the University of California Los Angeles in 2003, where she swam under Head Women's Water Polo Coach Adam Krikorian, Rulon was second in scoring on the UCLA Bruins with 27 goals, 26 assists and 27 steals, and scored once in the Bruins' 4-3 victory over Stanford University in the NCAA Women's Water Polo Championship; she finished with six post-season goals.

Returning from the 2004 Olympics for UCLA's 2005 season, Rulon led her team in scoring with 70 goals, as well as multi-goal games (22), assists (48), steals (72) and post-season goals (12). She led the Bruins to the 2004 NCAA title with a 33-0 record and was named a first-team All-American by the American Water Polo Coaches Association. When UCLA defeated Stanford University in the NCAA final, Rulon, who scored three goals in the semifinal win over Hawaii, led UCLA in scoring for the season and post-season.

Peter J. Cutino Award trophy

As a junior, Rulon was selected the Most Valuable Player of the 2006 NCAA Tournament after leading UCLA to its second consecutive and fourth total NCAA title. She scored 11 goals in the three games to set a new NCAA Tournament record. In the 9-8 championship victory over the University of Southern California, Rulon scored four goals and set up the game-winner by drawing an ejection foul with four seconds to play. During her senior year, Rulon had 70 goals, totaled a team-high 52 assists and team-leading 42 steals, and recorded seven blocks and 26 earned exclusions, both totals ranking second-highest on the club. She scored in 26 matches and posted 16 multi-goal efforts. Then she registered a season-high six goals against Loyola Marymount (March 31). Another highlight was the five goals she scored twice – versus Santa Clara (Feb. 24) and UC San Diego (March 16). Rulan had six four-goal performances and had netted 19 goals in a four-game span. She and her team-mates led UCLA to the school's record 100th NCAA National Championship.

=== Peter J. Cutino Award ===
In 2007, Rulon was named winner of the Peter J. Cutino Award, which is given to the college Player-of-the-Year in water polo. She joined other UCLA Bruins, Coralie Simmons (2001), Natalie Golda (2005), and Courtney Mathewson (2008), as the school's four UCLA female Peter J. Cutino Award winners, all coached by Adam Krikorian.

== Water Polo Goal Scoring at UCLA ==
Year	Goals	Attempts	Percentage
2003	27	70	39
2005	70	122	57
2006	59	101	58
2007	70	123	57
Totals	226	416	211

== International competition highlights ==
Rulon received MVP honors at the 1999 Junior Olympics and was five-time Junior Olympics First-Team All-American. She played in the 2002 Junior Pan American Championships, where she was the tournament's leading scorer. After the 2005 collegiate season, Rulon played for the U.S. National Team that won a silver medal in the 2005 FINA World Championships in Canada. Rulon was a two-time medalist, with one gold and a silver at the World Championships.

During 2009 FINA World Championship in Rome, which saw US women team winning the gold medal, Kelly Rulon scored last two goals of the final match against Canada. She was also awarded of the Gold Cap as tournament's best player.

Kelly trained with the USA Water Polo National Team and in October 2011 where she led Team USA to the gold medal at the Pan American games.

== Olympics ==
=== 2004 Olympic bronze medal ===
In 2004, Rulon redshirted from UCLA to play on the Women's U.S. Water Polo team in the Summer Olympics in Athens, Greece under Head U.S. Women's Olympic Water Polo Coach Guy Baker. As the youngest player on the team at only 20, Rulon scored four goals in Olympic competition including the game-winning goal against Hungary in the opening game. The US women won the bronze medal by defeating Australia.

=== 2012 London Olympic gold medal ===
In 2012, Rulon played in the Summer Olympics in London, England, winning the gold medal under Head Women's Water polo coach Adam Krikorian. The US women's team won the gold medal, against Spain with a score in the final match of 8-5.

== Clubs ==
Rulon left UCLA after the 2007 College season to move to Europe. In the same year she joined the A.S.D Roma team playing in the Italian Women's Waterpolo Championship. With A.S.D. Roma she won that the LEN Cup, as best scorer of the final match in Padua. Rulon played 2008/09 season for Nervi, and was the scoring leader in the Italian Championship with 81 goals.

== Awards ==
In 2020, Rulon was inducted into the USA Water Polo Hall of Fame.

She was inducted into the UCLA Athletic Hall of Fame as a member of the 2023 class.

== Personal life ==
Rulon's younger sister, Katie, was also a member of the UCLA water polo team.

== See also ==
- United States women's Olympic water polo team records and statistics
- List of Olympic champions in women's water polo
- List of Olympic medalists in water polo (women)
- List of world champions in women's water polo
- List of World Aquatics Championships medalists in water polo
