= Lauren Wenger =

American water polo player (born 1984)

Personal information
- Full name: Lauren Ashley Wenger
- Born: March 11, 1984 (age 42) Long Beach, California, U.S.
Medal record
Women's water polo
Representing the United States
Olympic Games
Gold medal – first place	2012 London	Team competition
Silver medal – second place	2008 Beijing	Team competition
World Championships
Gold medal – first place	2007 Melbourne	Team competition
Gold medal – first place	2009 Rome	Team competition
Silver medal – second place	2005 Montreal	Team competition
Pan American Games
Gold medal – first place	2011 Guadalajara	Team competition

Lauren Ashley Wenger (born March 11, 1984) is an American water polo player for the University of Southern California, who received the 2006 Peter J. Cutino Award as the best collegiate water polo player among Division I NCAA teams. Her position is two-meter defender.

== Career ==
=== High School ===
Wenger was All-American at Wilson Classical High School in Long Beach, California, and earned a scholar-athlete award all four years. In 2002, she played on the US National Team that won the Pan-American Championship. From 2003 to 2006 she attended USC, where in her senior year she led her Trojans team in steals and assists, becoming no. 8 all-time scorer with 127 career goals. In 2004, Wengers team won the NCAA championship.

Wenger is a member of the U.S National Team, helping Team USA win silver at the 2005 Water Polo World Championship. At USC, she majored in policy, planning and development.

=== Professional career ===
She played her first international season for the Greek powerhouse Olympiacos in Greece in 2006–2007.

At the 2008 China Summer Olympic games, she and the American team lost 8-9 in the championship game to the Netherlands and took home the silver medal.

In June, 2009, Wenger was named to the USA water polo women's senior national team for the 2009 FINA World Championships.

In 2011, Wenger placed 6th in the FINA World Championships with Team USA.

In August 2012, she won the gold medal in London 2012 Olympic Games with the US team, defeating Spain in the final match.

== Awards ==
In 2019, Wenger was inducted into the USA Water Polo Hall of Fame.

== See also ==
- United States women's Olympic water polo team records and statistics
- List of Olympic champions in women's water polo
- List of Olympic medalists in water polo (women)
- List of world champions in women's water polo
- List of World Aquatics Championships medalists in water polo
