= Kami Craig =

American water polo player (born 1987)

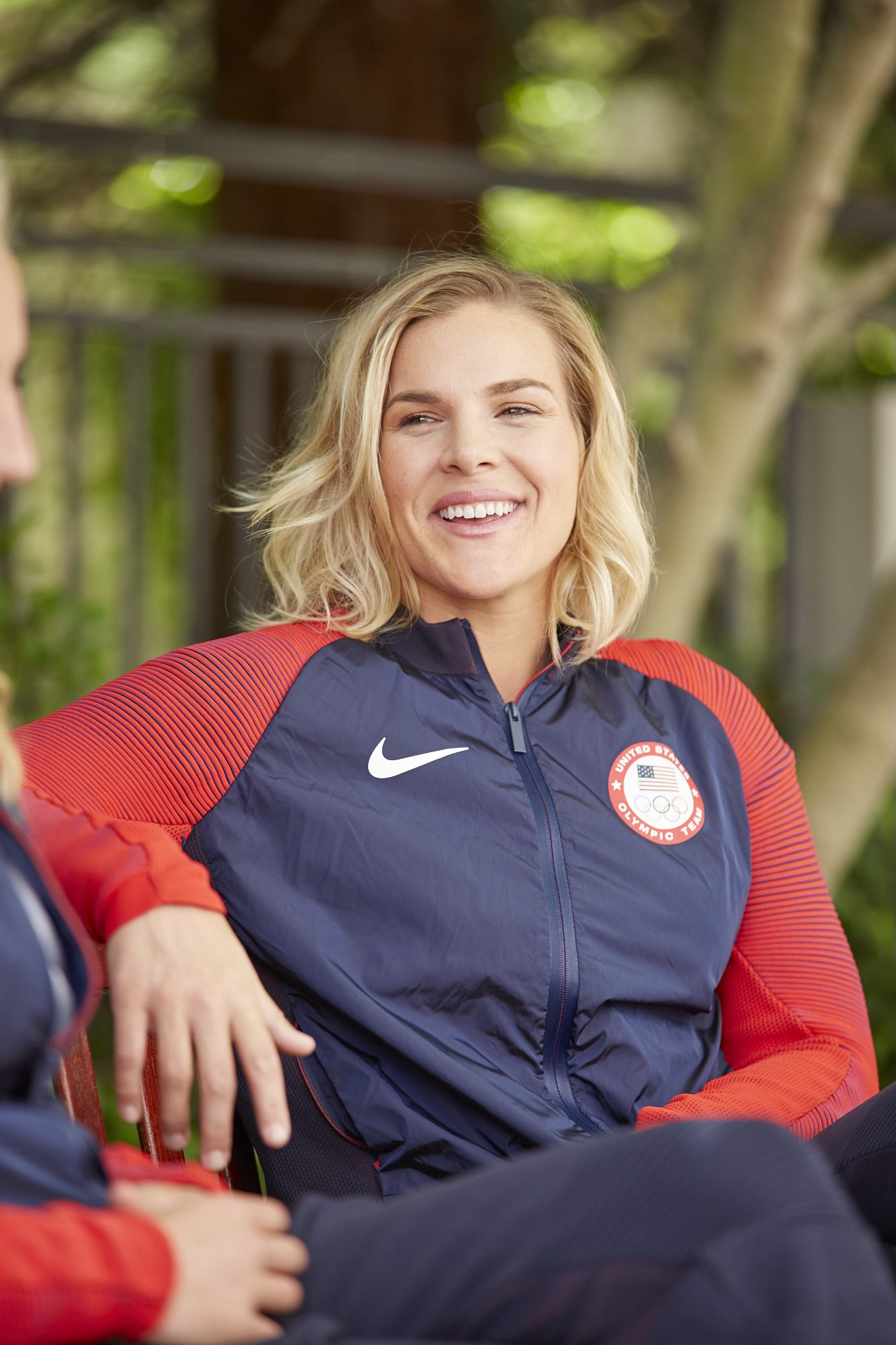
- Craig in 2016

Personal information
- Full name: Kameryn Louise Craig
- Nationality: American
- Born: July 21, 1987 (age 38) Camarillo, California, U.S
- Height: 1.80 m (5 ft 11 in)
- Weight: 95 kg (209 lb)

Sport
- Country: United States
- Sport: Water polo
Medal record
Olympic Games
| Gold medal – first place | 2012 London | Team |
| Gold medal – first place | 2016 Rio de Janeiro | Team |
| Silver medal – second place | 2008 Beijing | Team |
World Championships
| Gold medal – first place | 2007 Melbourne | Team |
| Gold medal – first place | 2009 Rome | Team |
| Gold medal – first place | 2015 Kazan | Team |
Pan American Games
| Gold medal – first place | 2011 Guadalajara | Team |

Kameryn Louise "Kami" Craig (born July 21, 1987) is an American water polo player. She was a member of the US water polo team that won a silver medal at the 2008 Beijing Olympics and a gold medal in London in 2012 and Rio in 2016.

Craig attended Santa Barbara High School, graduating in 2005 and the University of Southern California, graduating in 2010. She played water polo for the Trojans.

== Career ==
Craig played on the women's varsity team in high school as well as playing on the Youth National Team from 2003 to 2006. She played for four years at USC.

In June 2009, Kami was named to the USA water polo women's senior national team for the 2009 FINA World Championships.

In 2011, she played her first professional season in Greece, playing for the Greek giants Olympiacos.

In 2021, Craig was inducted into the USA Waterpolo Hall of Fame.

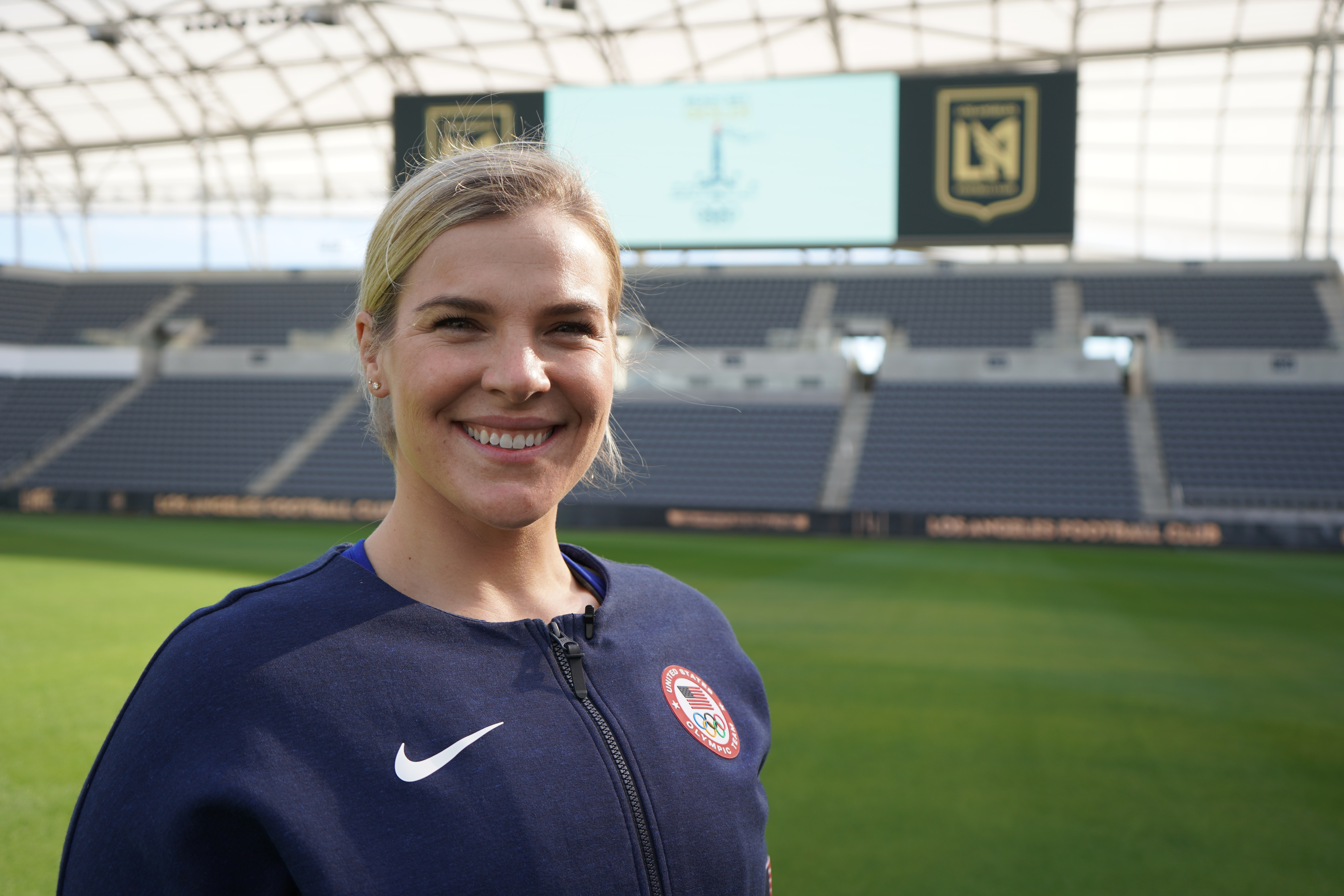

== Awards and honors ==
She, UCLA women's water polo senior Tanya Gandy, and her teammate Michelle Stein have been selected as the three finalists for the 2009 Peter J. Cutino Award, an accolade presented annually to the outstanding female and male collegiate water polo players in the United States. The winners were announced at the 10th annual Peter J. Cutino Awards Night Dinner on Saturday, June 6, at The Olympic Club's City Clubhouse in San Francisco.

She was the 2009 Peter J. Cutino Award female winner.

Craig won the Peter J. Cutino Award again in 2010, making her the only female player to have won it twice in a row.

== Personal life ==
While at USC, Craig majored in sociology and minored in occupational therapy.

== See also ==
- United States women's Olympic water polo team records and statistics
- List of Olympic champions in women's water polo
- List of Olympic medalists in water polo (women)
- List of players who have appeared in multiple women's Olympic water polo tournaments
- List of world champions in women's water polo
- List of World Aquatics Championships medalists in water polo
