= Ashleigh Johnson =

American water polo player (born 1994)

Personal information
- Full name: Ashleigh Elizabeth Johnson
- Nickname: "Ayay"
- Nationality: USA
- Born: September 12, 1994 (age 32) Miami, Florida, United States
- Height: 186 cm (6 ft 1 in)
- Weight: 81 kg (179 lb)

Sport
- Sport: Water polo
- Position: Goaltender (WP)
- College team: Princeton University (2017)
- Coached by: Eric Lefebvre (Ransom Everglades); Luis Nicolao (Princeton); Adam Krikorian (Olympics)
Medal record
Woman's water polo
Representing the United States
Olympic Games
Gold medal – first place	2016 Rio de Janeiro	Team competition
Gold medal – first place	2020 Tokyo	Team competition
World Championships
Gold medal – first place	2015 Kazan	Team competition
Gold medal – first place	2019 Gwangju	Team competition
Pan American Games
Gold medal – first place	2015 Toronto	Team competition
Gold medal – first place	2019 Lima	Team competition

Ashleigh Elizabeth Johnson (born September 12, 1994) is an American water polo player who competed for Princeton University, and played with the Orizzonte Catania and Ethnikos Piraeus professional teams. She was considered by many skilled observers of water polo to be among the best women's goalkeepers of her era. She was part of the American national team that won the gold medal at both the 2015 World Aquatics Championships and the 2019 World Aquatics Championships. In 2016, she became the first African-American woman to make the US Olympic team in water polo. While playing in the critical role of goaltender, she was part of the gold-medal winning 2016 and 2020 U.S. women's water polo Olympic teams, and earned a spot on the 2024 U.S. women's water polo Olympic team that placed fourth overall in competition.

== Early life ==
Johnson's was born September 12, 1994 in Miami, Florida to Jamaican natives Donna and Winston Johnson. She was raised in Miami by her mother, Donna Johnson, and grew up with three brothers and one sister, who all played water polo.

Growing up in Miami, her mom had all her kids involved in aquatics, but had to "drag" Ashleigh to swim practice:

Yeah, I did not like swimming. Swimming was not my thing. Swimming was kind of what you had to do, and water polo was the reward. We'd go to school - actually, elementary school - walk across the park, and then we'd go from swim practice to water polo practice. So it was just our endless cycle, day to day - school, park, swimming, water polo. And I fell in love with the sport.

Her brothers are Blake, Julius and William. Her younger sister Chelsea, worked the 2 Meter Center position and competed with Johnson at Princeton.

About her decision to play goalie in water polo, Johnson shared with Princeton Alumni Weekly her interest in playing the goaltender position, trace back to her sister Chelsea:

I was just copying her. I wasn't choosing to go in the goal because it was anything that appealed to me in particular.

=== Ransom Everglades High ===
Graduating in 2012, Johnson attended Miami's Ransom Everglades School, where she was trained and managed in water polo primarily under Ransom Coach Eric Lefebvre. At Ransom Everglades High, she was a four-year letter winner and starter on her school's water polo team, guiding them to three state championships, and earned All-Dade County honors throughout her High School career.

As a multi-sport athlete, Johnson also competed in swimming in high school, as did many outstanding water polo players. She earned all-county honors twice in swimming, and was the Florida State individual High School champion in the 50-yard Freestyle event in her Sophomore year in 2009 with a time of 23:46.

As a senior, Johnson committed to play water polo at Princeton University though she had also strongly considered the University of Southern California.

=== Princeton University ===
Johnson attended Princeton University on a full athletic scholarship, where she played water polo goalkeeper under Head Coach Luis Nicolao. In her first year she was named Third-Team All American, while earning Honorable Mention as a sophomore in 2014, and Second Team as a junior in 2015. During her time with the Princeton Women's team, they won Southern titles in 2013 and 2014, and were Eastern Championships in 2013 and 2015. The team played in the NCAA Championships in both 2013 and 2015. In 2016, Princeton's women's water polo team placed third in the Collegiate Water Polo Association (CWPA) Championship, and Johnson, as a Sophomore was honored as a member of the All Collegiate Water Polo Association Tournament team. With her speed and awareness of her competitors' strategies, Coach Nicolao, who trusted her instincts, allowed her to occasionally dart out from the goal line to meet attackers and steal the ball or block a shot, though on a few occasions it cost Princeton a goal.

In 2017, Johnson graduated with a bachelor's degree in Psychology from Princeton. Her sister Chelsea, who also played for Princeton, graduated in 2018.

Johnson finished her collegiate water polo career as Princeton's all-time leader in saves with 1,362. During her time at Princeton, she compiled a 100-17 win-loss record with a .693 save percentage as goaltender. She was the first Princeton women's water polo player to be named first team All-America and she was the third ever to be selected All-America in each of her four seasons. She was a 19-time CWPA Defensive Player of the Week award winner, a four-time first-team all-conference player and the CWPA Player of the Year.

== 2016 Rio de Janeiro Olympics ==
Johnson was the first African-American woman to make the US Olympic water polo team when she was selected for the 2016 Summer Olympics. At the 2016 Olympics, she was coached by former UCLA women's coach Adam Krikorian, a USA Water Polo Hall of Fame inductee. Johnson brought geographical diversity to the US team as the only team member not from California. Her age, 21 years old, and her sub-Saharan African ancestry were highlighted by Sports Illustrated leading up to the 2016 Olympic Games. As goalkeeper, she was a critical part of leading the US team to the gold medal. In doing so, she became just the second Princeton Tiger to win an Olympic gold medal, then return to compete for the university.

By her Olympic years, observers of the game noted that her height and long arms gave her particular skill in shooting lengthy passes to team members for counterattacks, and to block high shots to the goal. Observers of the game also noted her ease and speed moving through the water to position herself quickly.

== Professional water polo ==
=== Orizzonte Catania, Italy ===
Beginning in January 2018, she played for the Orizzonte Catania, one of the most titled clubs in Europe. She lived and trained in Italy for Orizzonte Catania during the season, and trained in the United States in the off-season.

=== Ethnikos Piraeus, Greece ===
During the 2021-22 season, she was the goalkeeper of Greek Ethnikos Piraeus, a club with a strong tradition of achievement in Greek water polo. On March 30, she won the Women's LEN Trophy with Ethnikos Piraeus, her first European club competition title. That was the second time Ethnikos has won the title, thus becoming the Greek team with the most wins in the competition.

== 2020 Tokyo Olympics ==
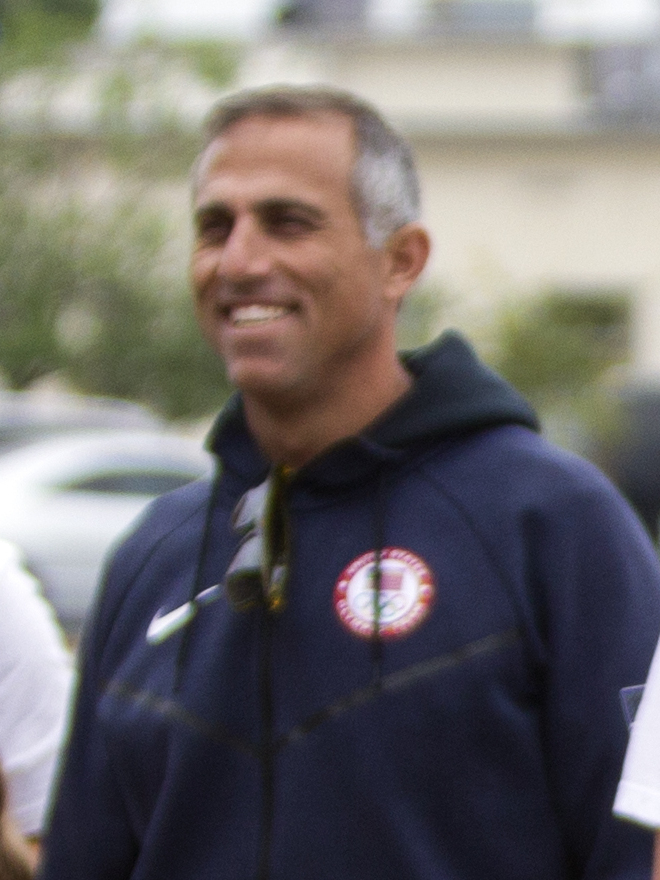
Coach Krikorian

Johnson competed on the US Olympic water polo team in the Tokyo 2020 Summer Olympics, held in 2021 due to the COVID-19 pandemic. The U.S. women's water polo team earned the team gold medal under Head Coach Adam Krikorian. Johnson made 80 saves during the 2020 Olympics, the most saves for a goalkeeper in both the women's and men's tournaments. Krikorian had played water polo for UCLA, and had a strong win record coaching the UCLA women's team. In 2020, the United States was a distinct pre-Olympic favorite to win the gold medal, having captured the two previous Olympic medals in 2012 and 2016 under Krikorian, as well as having won the 2015, 2017, and 2019 World Championships.

The U.S. women's team won the gold medal, defeating Spain 14-5 in the final round to determine the gold and silver medal winners. Strong in the late rounds, the U.S. Women had previously won both their quarter-final and semi-final rounds, while Spain beat the strong women's teams from China and Hungary to also move to the final round. In early rounds, in an unexpected outcome, the U.S. women had lost to Hungary, a country with a strong tradition in men's water polo.

== 2024 Paris Olympics ==
At the age of 29, Johnson appeared in her third Olympiad in Paris at the 2024 Summer Olympics. The US team's first match was against Greece, and the they won easily with Johnson only allowing 4 points as goalkeeper. US Olympic head coach, Adam Krikorian, has said of Johnson:

She's an incredible athlete. She's got great hand-eye coordination, great reflexes and reactions. And then she's fiercely competitive - fiercely. And you would never know it by her demeanor or by the huge smile on her face. But to us, on the inside, we know how driven she is to be one of the best ever to do it.

Team USA Women's Water Polo ended the 2024 Olympic water polo tournament in fourth place after a 10 - 11 loss to the Netherlands. Johnson allowed only 37 percent of the shots on goal taken by the Netherlands women's team.

In highlights of her international competition, she won a team gold medal in the 2015 Pan American Games in Toronto, and a gold medal in the 2019 Pan American Games in Lima, Peru. She won two golds in the World Championships with one in 2015 in Kazan, and one in 2019 in Gwangju.

Looking to aid the Miami community, around 2021-2, Johnson and her sister Chelsea helped to create a program for lower income middle school students learning to swim.

== Activism ==
As the only Black player and the only person from the East Coast, Johnson described playing on the Olympic team as a difficult transition. She has said,

I didn't really have a dream to be here because I just didn't see a pathway to be here. I didn't see, like, anyone who looked like me here, anyone with my background here, and it just seemed like a world away.

Her coach encouraged her to embrace her role model status:

...it really took me understanding the bigger context of not only our sport, but access to aquatics, the historical exclusion of people of color from aquatics spaces, and it took all of that to start writing a new history, start writing a new story, start opening up that pathway for the people who will follow me - the girls and boys who look like me - to gain that confidence that maybe I didn't have, that dream that I didn't have because I didn't see a lot of people who looked like me in this space.

Her teammates encourage that role as well. Johnson has encouraged younger athletes saying: "We belong in the pool." She has added:

A lesson that I wish I had heard when I was young was that your difference is the thing that's going to add to the team. It's going to set you apart, and it's going to make your team better. Like, I play this game differently. I look differently than most people in my sport. I tell a lot of kids who, like, tell me that they don't feel like they fit into their team - and I'm like, you keep being you. Your difference makes you great. Your uniqueness is an add, and it takes all types.

In the 2024 Olympics, she has joined with the team's "hype man," rapper Flavor Flav to raise the visibility of water polo particularly in the Black community. Johnson said,

I don't think people of color have had adequate access to aquatic spaces, and you can see it in the way our sport looks, see it in the way swimming looks. It's not representative of the U.S. in terms of diversity. One of the biggest barriers for people of color in water spaces, not just water polo, is the story that they don't belong here. So talking about it and saying you do, seeing a man who's a rapper, who's not even part of this space get so passionate and invested in a team like ours, I think is life changing...I think that's one of those things that breaks down a barrier.

Johnson has observed that in the Black community football is a unifying sport because everyone loves it, has someone they love in the sport and feels like they belong such that it feels like "family." She added, "That's what I want water polo to feel like for people of color."

== Awards ==
- Swimming World 2014 Female Water Polo Player of the Year
- Swimming World 2015 Female Water Polo Player of the Year
- Swimming World 2016 Female Water Polo Player of the Year
- Swimming World 2019 Female Water Polo Player of the Year
- Forbes, List of Most Noteworthy People in Sports 30 Under 30: 2022
- Water polo at the 2022 FINA World Championships – Women's tournament: Most Valuable Goalkeeper
- Water polo at the 2024 World Aquatics Championships – Women's tournament: Best Goalkeeper

== See also ==
- Diversity in swimming
- List of Olympic champions in women's water polo
- List of Olympic medalists in water polo (women)
- List of women's Olympic water polo tournament goalkeepers
- List of world champions in women's water polo
- List of World Aquatics Championships medalists in water polo
- United States women's Olympic water polo team records and statistics
