= Daniel Klatt =

American water polo player (born 1978)

Personal information
- Born: October 28, 1978 (age 47) Dallas, Texas
- Occupations: Water Polo Coach * U.C. Irvine 2004- * U.S. National Team
- Height: 1.95 m (6 ft 5 in)
- Weight: 92 kg (203 lb)

Sport
- Sport: Water polo, Swimming
- College team: University of California Irvine
- Club: Newport Water Polo Foundation
- Coached by: Ted Newland (UC Irvine WP); Ratko Rudic (04 Olympics)

Daniel Ivan "Dan" Klatt (born October 28, 1978) is a former American water polo player who competed at the 2004 Summer Olympics, where his team finished in seventh place. He has served as the Head Coach for women's water polo at the University of California Irvine for over two decades beginning in 2004, and served as Head Coach of the UC Irvine men's team beginning in 2022. He has served as an Assistant water polo coach to the U.S. National Team, where he helped lead the U.S. women's team to gold medals in the 2012 London, 2016 Brazil and 2020 Tokyo Olympics.

== Early life ==
Daniel Klatt was born October 28, 1978 in Dallas, Texas. He learned to swim at age 3, from his father, Richard Klatt, who played water polo and swam for the University of New Mexico and later coached both sports at the University. Father Richard was an elite swimming competitor who set a world swimming record as part of the 4x200 relay team at the 1973 World Championships in Belgrade, Yugoslavia. Daniel began competing in swimming by age six, eventually excelling in both freestyle and backstroke, but later focused on water polo, less frequently competing in swimming at the university level.

Klatt graduated from Clovis West High School in Clovis, CA in 1996, where he was a two time All-American in water polo and swimming and was coached in water polo by Steve Mosher. Though he spent most of his time in water polo on the bench in his Sophomore year, he was Clovis's second leading scorer in his Junior year. Klatt helped lead his high school team to Central Section Championships in swimming in successive years from 1993-1996 and to Central Section championships in water polo in successive years from 1993-1995. He frequently played the 2-meter position which utilized his strength and height, where he lined up at the center of the goal. In September 1994, Klatt scored two goals to help lead Clovis West to a 7-6 victory over Bellarmine of San Jose at the finals of the John Schmidt Water Polo tournament. Accomplished in High School, Klatt was Senior Class President, and had a cumulative grade point average of 3.5 in his Senior year.

== University of California Irvine ==
Graduating in 2001, Klatt attended, played water polo and swam for the University of California, Irvine, where he competed in water polo under Head Coach Ted Newland and in swimming under coach Charlie Schober. Klatt was a captain of the UC Irvine water polo team in two years, and was a two time water polo All-American in the years 1998 and 2000. In collegiate swimming, he was the Big West Conference Champion at 50m and 100m, excelling in sprint events.

In international competition, Klatt earned a gold medal playing with the U.S. National team at the 2003 Pan American games in Santo Domingo, Dominican Republic.

== 2004 Athens Olympics ==
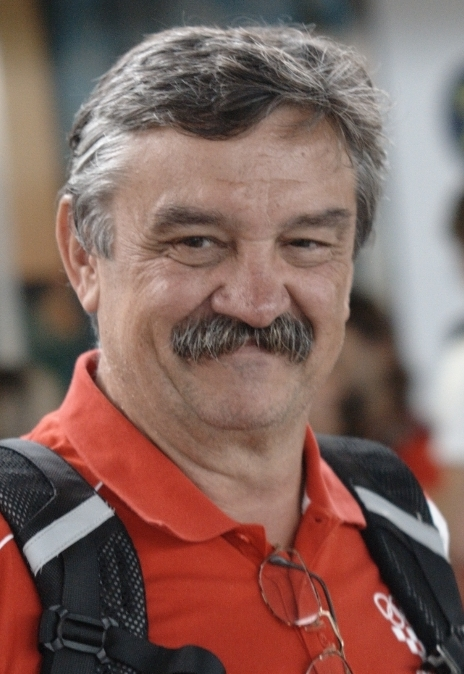
Ratko Rudic, 2012

Klatt competed with the U.S. men's water polo team at the 2004 Olympics under Head Coach Ratko Rudić where the U.S. team placed seventh. Pre-Olympic favorites Hungary earned the gold, Serbia and Montenegro won the silver, and the Russian Federation took the bronze medal.

== Coaching ==
=== U.C. Irvine ===
He retired from elite competition shortly after the 2004 Olympics to become the head coach of the women's water polo team at the University of California, Irvine, serving from at least 2004-2025, and took over as the Head of the UC Irvine Men's water polo team in 2022. As a high profile women's water polo coach at UC Irvine, he was a nine time Big West Coach of the Year, the most in his conference. Klatt led the UC Irvine women to nine championships in the Big West, and earned eight NCAA appearances. On an individual level, he has coached 48 All-Americans. In 21 years with the UC Irvine Women's Water Polo team from 2004-2025, Klatt had a combined record of 413 and 211 for a winning percentage of .662. His record with the UC Irvine Men's water polo team from 2022-2024 was 52-32, for a winning percentage of .619.

=== Olympic coach ===
Klatt served as an assistant coach with the national women's water polo team under Head Coach Adam Krikorian in the 2012 London, 2016 Brazil and 2020 Tokyo Olympic Games, where he helped lead the U.S. women to three successive Olympic gold medals. He has also coached the U.S. Women's Junior National team.

=== Honors ===
Klatt became a member of the Clovis Unified Hall of Fame in 2020.
