= Courtney Mathewson =

American water polo player (born 1986)

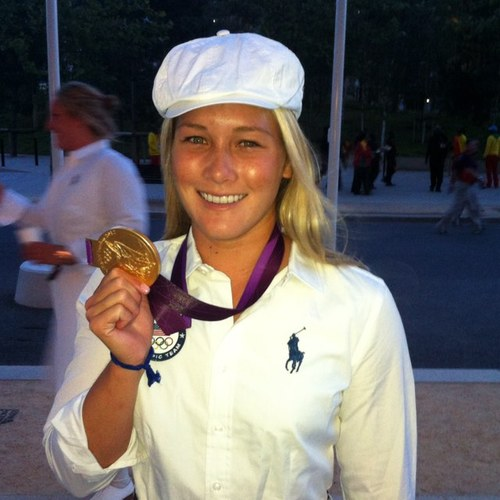
- Mathewson at the Olympic Closing Ceremonies in London, UK.

Personal information
- Full name: Courtney Lynn Kaiulani Mathewson
- Born: September 14, 1986 (age 39) Orange, California, U.S.
- Height: 5 ft 7 in (170 cm)
- Weight: 154 lb (70 kg)
- Spouse: Chris Morinello

Sport
- Country: United States
- Sport: Water polo
- Position: Attacker
- College team: University of California Los Angeles
- Coached by: Guy Baker (UCLA)
Medal record
Olympic Games
Gold medal – first place	2012 London	Team
Gold medal – first place	2016 Rio de Janeiro	Team
World Championships
Gold medal – first place	2015 Kazan	Team
Pan American Games
Gold medal – first place	2011 Guadalajara	Team
Gold medal – first place	2015 Toronto	Team
FINA World Cup
Gold medal – first place	2010 New Zealand
Gold medal – first place	2014 Khanty-Mansiysk
FINA World League
Gold medal – first place	2010 La Jolla
Gold medal – first place	2011 Tianjin
Gold medal – first place	2012 Changshu
Gold medal – first place	2015 Shanghai
Gold medal – first place	2016 Shanghai
Bronze medal – third place	2013 Beijing

Courtney Lynn Kaiulani Mathewson (born September 14, 1986) is an American water polo player, part of the US team that won the gold medal at the 2012 Summer Olympics and 2016 Summer Olympics. She played water polo for the University of California, Los Angeles (UCLA) Bruins during their four-consecutive NCAA National Champion Women's Water Polo championships, and was named to the All-Tournament first team. At UCLA, she majored in sociology.

== College career ==
During the 2008 season, Mathewson scored 54 goals in 33 matches. The Anaheim Hills, Calif., resident scored four goals in the final two NCAA Tournament matches – including three in an 11–4 semifinal win over UC Davis – to earn all-tournament team accolades.

== Honors ==
Mathewson has earned prestigious honors after leading the Bruins to the undefeated season. Courtney was named to the Pac-12 All-Century Team. She also won the 2008 Peter J. Cutino Award, which is presented annually to the outstanding female and male collegiate water polo players in the United States. The award is named in honor of the late Peter J. Cutino, a former University of California and The Olympic Club coach, who died in September 2004. Cutino, who is enshrined in the U.S. Water Polo Hall of Fame, earned National Water Polo Coach of the Year honors 17 times and led California to eight NCAA titles.

Peter J. Cutino Award trophy to the Player-of-the-Year

Mathewson and teammate Jillian Kraus captured Mountain Pacific Sports Federation (MPSF) Co-Player of the Year honors after having led UCLA to the MPSF Tournament title for the second consecutive year. In the MPSF Tournament, Mathewson was named the tournament MVP after having combined for seven goals in the final two matches.

She joins other Bruins, Sean Kern, Coralie Simmons, Natalie Golda, and Kelly Rulon as Peter J. Cutino Award winners. Mathewson has also been named Division I Player of the Year by the Association of College Water Polo Coaches (ACWPC).

Mathewson currently trains with the USA Water Polo National Team and in October 2011 helped lead Team USA to the gold medal at the Pan American games. On November 10, 2021, she was inducted into USA Water Polo Hall of Fame.

== See also ==
- United States women's Olympic water polo team records and statistics
- List of Olympic champions in women's water polo
- List of Olympic medalists in water polo (women)
- List of world champions in women's water polo
- List of World Aquatics Championships medalists in water polo
