= Peter J. Cutino Award =

American college water polo award

The Cutino Trophy (photo courtesy of the Olympic Club)

The Peter J. Cutino Award, named after former college water polo player and UC Berkeley coach Peter J. Cutino, is considered the most prestigious individual award in American collegiate water polo. It is given annually to the top male and female player in the National Collegiate Athletic Association (NCAA).

== History ==
The award was first presented in 1999 by the Trustees of The Olympic Club in San Francisco. The Club, founded in 1860 to support amateur athletics in the Bay Area, is one of America's oldest athletic clubs. Nominees for the Cutino Award are selected by the Division I water polo coaches. These coaches vote for three players as nominees, none of which can be members of their own team. The eventual winner is voted on again by the same coaches, who now rank the nominees and can vote for members of their own teams. The Olympic Club, which tabulates the votes, does not release the number of votes to avoid manipulation of the totals. Each winner receives a brass and walnut trophy, and the perpetual trophy is on display at the Olympic Club of San Francisco.

Originally the award was announced after the end of both the men's (December) and women's (May) college seasons. Former major league baseball commissioner and US Olympic Committee chair Peter Ueberroth, himself once a water polo player at San Jose State, presented the first awards on January 22, 2000. The 2001 women's winner, Coralie Simmons, was presented with her award almost a year after her season had ended because the Trustees decided to change the cycle to coincide with the academic year. Thus in June 2002, Simmons won the 2001 award, while Brenda Villa received the 2002 women's Cutino at the same ceremony. The nominees are now announced each spring, before the end of the women's NCAA water polo season, but well after the men's season ends in December of the prior year. The award ceremony is held at an Olympic Club facility in San Francisco, shortly after the Women's NCAA Championship is decided.

== Peter J. Cutino Award winners ==
Year	Men's winner	School	Year Presented	Women's winner	School
1999	Sean Kern	UCLA	1999	Bernice Orwig	USC
2000	Sean Kern	UCLA	2000	Aniko Pelle	USC
2001	Tony Azevedo	Stanford University	2001/2002	Coralie Simmons / Brenda Villa	UCLA / Stanford
2002	Tony Azevedo	Stanford University	2003	Jackie Frank	Stanford University
2003	Tony Azevedo	Stanford University	2004	Moriah van Norman	USC
2004	Tony Azevedo	Stanford University	2005	Natalie Golda	UCLA
2005	Juraj Zatovic	USC	2006	Lauren Wenger	USC
2006	John Mann	University of California, Berkeley	2007	Kelly Rulon	UCLA
2007	Tim Hutten	UC Irvine	2008	Courtney Mathewson	UCLA
2008	J. W. Krumpholz	USC	2009	Kami Craig	USC
2009	J. W. Krumpholz	USC	2010	Kami Craig	USC
2010	Ivan Rackov	University of California, Berkeley	2011	Annika Dries	Stanford University
2011	Joel Dennerley	USC	2012	Kiley Neushul	Stanford University
2012	Balazs Erdelyi	University of the Pacific	2013	Melissa Seidemann	Stanford University
2013	Balazs Erdelyi	University of the Pacific	2014	Annika Dries	Stanford University
2014	Konstantinos Genidounias	USC	2015	Kiley Neushul	Stanford University
2015	Garrett Danner	UCLA	2016	Stephania Haralabidis	USC
2016	McQuin Baron	USC	2017	Ashleigh Johnson	Princeton University
2017	Luca Cupido	University of California, Berkeley	2018	Amanda Longan	USC
2018	Ben Hallock	Stanford University	2019	Makenzie Fischer	Stanford University
2019	Ben Hallock	Stanford University	2020	COVID - No Season	
2020	Nicolas Saveljic	UCLA	2021	Maud Megens	USC
2021	Nikolaos Papanikolaou	University of California, Berkeley	2022	Makenzie Fischer	Stanford University
2022	Nikolaos Papanikolaou	University of California, Berkeley	2023	Aria Fischer	Stanford University
2023	Nikolaos Papanikolaou	University of California, Berkeley	2024	Isabel Williams	University of California, Berkeley
2024	Ryder Dodd	UCLA	2025	Ryann Neushul	Stanford University
2025	Ryder Dodd	UCLA	2026	Emily Ausmus	USC

(Source: Olympic Club) (Source: Swimming World Magazine) (Source: Swimming World Magazine)

== See also ==
- USA Water Polo Hall of Fame
