= Natalie Golda =

American water polo player (born 1981)

Personal information
- National team: USA
- Born: December 28, 1981 (age 44) Lakewood, California, U.S.
- Occupations: Water Polo Coach * Marist College (2013-2016) * Fresno State (2018-2025)
- Height: 180 cm (5 ft 11 in)
- Weight: 84 kg (185 lb)
- Spouse: Eric Benson
- Children: 2 daughters

Sport
- Sport: Water Polo
- Position: Defender, Center Forward
- College team: University of California Los Angeles
- Coached by: Todd Sprague (Rosary High School); Adam Krikorian (UCLA); Guy Baker (Olympics)
Medal record
U.S. Women's Water Polo National Team
Representing the United States
Olympic Games
Silver medal – second place	2008 Beijing	Team competition
Bronze medal – third place	2004 Athens	Team competition
World Championships
Gold medal – first place	2003 Barcelona	Team competition
Gold medal – first place	2007 Melbourne	Team competition
Silver medal – second place	2005 Montréal	Team competition

Natalie Golda (now Benson, born December 28, 1981) is a former American water polo player who competed for the University of California Los Angeles, and was a member of the US Water Polo Team that won the bronze medal at the 2004 Athens Olympics and the silver medal at the 2008 Beijing Olympics. She coached women's water polo at Marist College from 2013 to 2016, and was hired to coach at Fresno State College's initial women's water polo program beginning in 2018, where she has continued at least through the 2026 season. In 2015, she was inducted into the USA Water Polo Hall of Fame.

== Early life ==
She was born in Lakewood, California on December 28, 1981. Golda played varsity water polo for all four years at Rosary High School in Fullerton, California under head coach Todd Sprague. Her team won the California Interscholastic Federation title in 1998 and 1999, and she was named First-Team All-Golden West League from 1996 to 1999. A multi-sport athlete in High School, she lettered in softball for four years and volleyball for two.

== UCLA ==
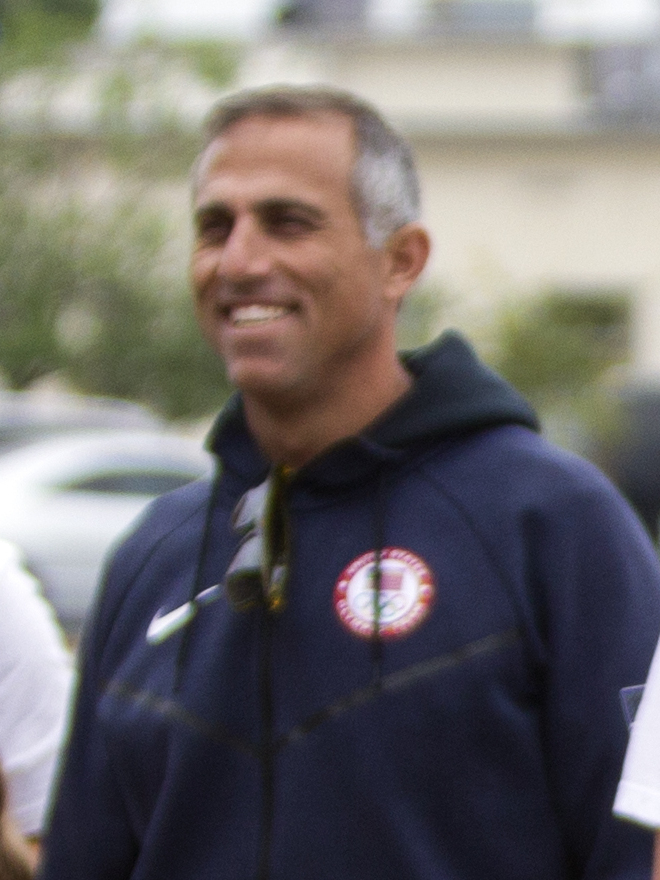
Krikorian in 2018

Playing both defender and center forward positions, Golda won three NCAA championships with UCLA in 2001, 2003, 2005, where she was coached primarily under coach Adam Krikorian. As a freshman in 2001, she helped the Bruins win the first women's water polo title recognized by the NCAA. In 2002, she earned Honorable Mention All-American honors and was named to the NCAA All-Tournament First-Team and All-MPSF (Mountain Pacific Sports Federation) Tournament Second Team. In 2003, Golda was named a first team All-American, first team All-MPSF, first team All-NCAA and All-MPSF Tournaments. She also led UCLA with 50 goals.

In her Senior year at UCLA, Golda was selected the Most Outstanding Player of the NCAA Women's Water Polo Championship after leading her team to a 3–2 victory over Stanford in the title game. Golda scored the first goal of the contest in the championship game and then led a defensive effort that held the Cardinal to just two goals, including none in the first half. In the last 30 seconds of the game, the Bruin defense held off a 6-on-5 advantage to preserve the 3–2 win. Golda had four goals in the three tournament games. An outstanding collegiate player, she helped guide the 2005 UCLA Bruins to their seventh national championship. In May 2005 Golda received the Peter J. Cutino Award, given annually to the outstanding player in women's collegiate water polo.

Cutino Award trophy

The Cutino Award ended Golda's UCLA career on a high note after winning the 2005 NCAA Championship and leading UCLA to a perfect 33–0 record and an NCAA record 33-game winning streak. Golda's other 2005 honors included: American Water Polo Coaches Association Player of the Year, MPSF Conference Player of the Year, NCAA Tournament MVP and NCAA first tournament team. She finished the 2005 season with 47 goals and her career with 158 goals, third-most in UCLA history.

Golda joined other UCLA Bruins, Coralie Simmons (2001), Kelly Rulon (2007), and Courtney Mathewson (2008), as the school's four UCLA woman Peter J. Cutino Award winners, all coached by Adam Krikorian.

=== UCLA Scoring by year ===
Year	Goals	Attempts	Percentage
2001	24	54	44
2002	37	71	52
2003	50	101	49
2005	47	105	48
Total	111	331	193

== 2004, 2008 Olympic medals ==
Golda was part of the U.S. Women's Water Polo Team that won the bronze medal at the 2004 Athens Olympics and the silver medal at the 2008 Beijing Olympics. In Olympic play, she was coached by U.S. Women's Head Coach Guy Baker, who had also coached her at UCLA. In 2004, Golda redshirted to play in the 2004 Olympic games in Athens, Greece. She scored two goals at the Athens Games, one against Hungary and another against Australia and helped the team win a bronze medal.

She was one of three returning players on the USA Olympic water polo team in the 2008 Beijing Olympics. In game one of the 2008 Olympics, Golda, the high scorer, led the team with 4 goals to a close 12–11 victory over Olympic newcomer China. Game two against defending gold medalist Italy ended in a draw after Italy managed to score a tying goal with only 22 seconds left in the game. The United States surged in game three against Russia with Golda scoring a team-leading 3 goals in a 12–7 defeat of Russia. In the Olympic semifinal, the U.S. women's water polo team beat Australia 9–8, with Golda scoring one goal and providing one assist. Golda scored one goal in the championship game against the Netherlands and took home the silver medal from Beijing.

== International highlights ==
Golda helped the US National Team win the 2003 Pan American Games in the Dominican Republic, qualifying the United States for Olympic water polo play at the Athens Olympiad in 2004. With her four tournament goals, the US team took gold at the 2003 FINA World Championships in Barcelona, Spain. In April 2006, she left for Greece to play for a club team in the League of European Nations, the ANC Glyfada team.

In February 2007, Golda was inducted into the New York Athletic Club (NYAC) Hall of Fame with fellow Olympic medalists Heather Moody and Nicolle Payne. The three women were members of the bronze medal 2004 U.S. Olympic team in Athens, and are the first women added to the NYAC Hall of Fame.

Golda and fellow UCLA Bruin Jaime Hipp are members of the USA water polo women's national team, which is ranked no. 1 in the world.

=== Honors ===
She was inducted into the UCLA Athletics Hall of Fame in 2016 and is a member of the USA Water Polo Hall of Fame.

== Coaching ==
=== Huntington Beach ===
Golda was the head coach of the Huntington Beach Water Polo Club where she led the team to a first place in the Junior Olympics in 2011 and a second place finish in 2012. During her tenure at the Huntington Beach Club, she coached future 2020 Tokyo water polo gold medalist Alys Williams Moore.

=== Marist College ===
In August 2013, she accepted the women's coaching position at Division I Marist College in New York. She has since guided the Red Foxes to Metro Atlantic Athletic Conference Water polo regular season championships in 2015, and second-place finishes in the MAAC Conference Championships. Golda was named Anaconda Sports Coach of the Year in 2014, and has had five players named All-MAAC First team, six on All-MAAC Second Team, One MAAC Rookie of the Year and 10 All-MAAC Academic Team Honors over the course of two seasons.

=== Fresno State ===
In 2016, Natalie Golda was named the first head women's water polo coach at Fresno State, and began competition during the spring of 2018. From 2018 to 2025, she led the Fresno State Bulldogs to an overall record of 114–79, and four Golden Coast Conference championship titles in four-straight years from 2021 to 2024.

== Personal ==
- Currently resides in Fresno, California, with her husband Eric Benson and her two daughters.
- Hobbies include writing, listening to music
- Favorite quote: "Life is too important to be taken seriously." – Oscar Wilde

== See also ==
- United States women's Olympic water polo team records and statistics
- List of Olympic medalists in water polo (women)
- List of world champions in women's water polo
- List of World Aquatics Championships medalists in water polo
