= Coralie Simmons =

American water polo player (born 1977)

Coralie Denise Simmons
Personal information
- Born: March 1, 1977 (age 49) Hemet, California, U.S.
- Occupations: Water Polo Coach; *Sonoma State; *U. Cal Berkeley (2015)
- Height: 172 cm (5 ft 8 in)
- Weight: 63 kg (139 lb)

Sport
- Sport: Swimming, Water Polo
- College team: University of California, Los Angeles
- Coached by: Guy Baker, Adam Krikorian (UCLA)
Medal record
Women's water polo
Representing the United States
Olympic Games
Silver medal – second place	2000 Sydney	Team competition
Pan American Games
Silver medal – second place	1999 Winnipeg	Team competition

Coralie Denise Simmons (born March 1, 1977) is an American water polo player, who competed for UCLA and won the silver medal in Women's Water Polo at the 2000 Summer Olympics in Sydney. In 2001, she won the Peter J. Cutino Award, presented annually to the top American collegiate water polo player. Since graduating UCLA in 2001, she has played professional water polo in Greece, and coached Water Polo at the University of California Berkeley in 2015, and Sonoma State.

Simmons was born in Hemet, California on March 1, 1977 to her father and Debbie Simmons, her future soccer coach. At Hemet High School, Simmons was girls' water polo team captain and Outstanding Defensive Player for her senior year in 1994. In addition to her outstanding play in Water Polo, she lettered four years in varsity swimming, where she was a four-time team MVP and two-time league champion. In 1995, Simmons set a California Interscholastic Federation (CIF) record in 100 breaststroke and 100 freestyle, and was recognized as CIF Outstanding Female Swimmer. She played three years of soccer with her mother as coach.

== 2000 Sydney Olympic Silver ==
Simmons helped the U.S. National Team qualify for the Olympic Games in the World Women's Olympic Qualification Tournament in Italy, scoring a team-leading eight goals. At the 2000 Olympic Women's Water Polo Team competition, where she was led by Olympic coaches Guy Baker and Adam Krikorian, she had a tie for top scorer with nine goals in Olympic play.

=== UCLA ===
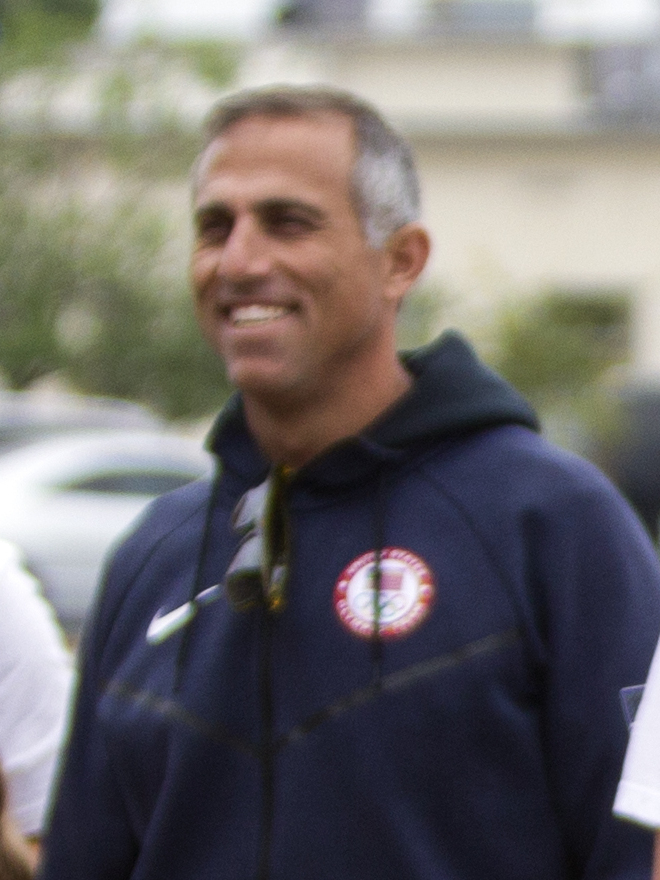
UCLA Coach Krikorian, 2018

Cutino Award trophy

Simmons was a two-time National Player of the Year at UCLA. In her final season with the Bruins in 2001, UCLA captured its fourth national title in the NCAA Women's Water Polo Championship, where she played primarily under Coach Adam Krikorian. Simmons scored with just 1:28 remaining in the final period to give the Bruins a 5-4 win, and was named the tournament MVP. She owns three of UCLA’s four offensive records in women's water polo, including career and season goals.

In June 2001, Simmons graduated from UCLA with a degree in geography and environmental studies.

Simmons joined other UCLA Bruins, Natalie Golda (2005), Kelly Rulon (2007), and Courtney Mathewson (2008), as the school's four woman Peter J. Cutino Award winners, all coached by Adam Krikorian.

=== International highlights ===
While still in high school, Simmons was chosen to join the U.S. Senior National team. She redshirted the 1999 and 2000 seasons at UCLA to play on the U.S. Women's National Team, helping the team qualify for the Olympic Games in the qualification tournament in Sicily. The US women won silver medals at the Pan-American Games in 1999, and in 2001 Simmons capture a silver medal at the 2001 FINA World Water Polo Cup where she led the team in scoring.

=== Honors ===
In collegiate honors, she was voted into the UCLA Athletics Hall of Fame in 2012, and became a member of the somewhat exclusive USA Water Polo Hall of Fame in 2023, having served as both an accomplished collegiate water polo player at UCLA, a 2000 Olympic silver medalist, and an accomplished collegiate coach.

== Coaching career ==
After graduating from UCLA in 2001, Simmons spent four years playing water polo as a professional in Athens, Greece. Before coaching at the University of Hawaii as an Assistant coach from 2005-2006, she coached at the Punahou School. In 2013, Simmons served as an Assistant Coach in Water Polo at her alma mater UCLA.

In 2015, she was named as the women's water polo coach at the University of California, Berkeley, after nine seasons as the head coach at Sonoma State University. During her decade long career as head coach at Berkeley, she helped lead the Berkeley Bears in four years to the semi-finals of the NCAA championships. At Sonoma State, she was named a Division II Coach of the Year. Simmons served as an assistant coach for the University of Hawaii women's water polo team during the 2005-06 school year. In international coaching, she was named as an assistant coach to the USA Water Polo Women’s Senior National Team for the 2009 FINA World Championships. She twice served as the Head Coach for the US Women’s Junior National Team, where she led the team to a 2015 World Championship.

UCLA Career Scoring

Year	Goals	Attempts	Percentage
1996	60	68	88
1997	60	91	66
1998	74*	115	64
2001	41	62	66
Totals	235*	336	70

(*school record)

== See also ==
- List of Olympic medalists in water polo (women)
