= Adam Krikorian =

American water polo coach (born 1974)

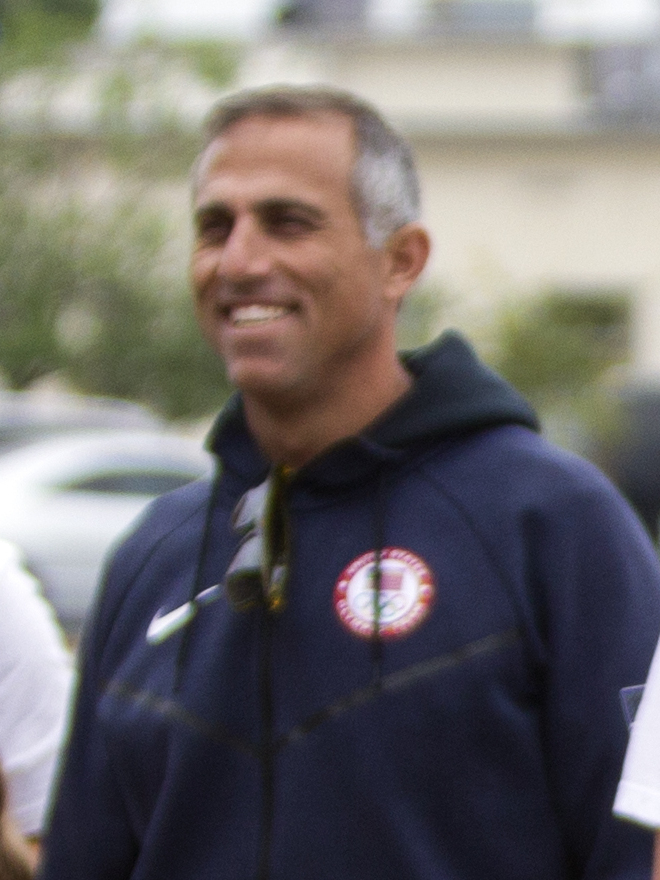
- Krikorian in 2012

Biographical details
- Born: 22 July 1974 (age 52); Santa Clara, California, U.S.

Playing career
- 1992-95: UCLA Water Polo; Coach Guy Baker

Coaching career (HC unless noted)
- 1996-2009: UCLA Water Polo Coach; Mentored by Guy Baker
- 2009–: U.S. Women's National WP Team

Accomplishments and honors

Championships
- 3 NCAA titles (UCLA men); 11 NCAA titles (UCLA women); 3 Women's Olympic W.P. Team Gold Medals (2012, 2016, 2020)

Awards
- UCLA Sports Hall of Fame (2016); Men's WP Coach of the Year (2004); Women's WP Coach of year (2001, 2005, 2006 and 2007); 2013 USOC Coach of the Year
Medal record
U.S. Women's National Water Polo Team
Representing United States
Olympic Games
Gold medal – first place	2012 London	Team
Gold medal – first place	2016 Rio de Janeiro	Team
Gold medal – first place	2020 Tokyo	Team
World Championship
Gold medal – first place	2009 Rome	Team
Gold medal – first place	2015 Kazan	Team
Gold medal – first place	2017 Budapest	Team
Gold medal – first place	2019 Gwangju	Team
Gold medal – first place	2022 Budapest	Team
FINA World Cup
Gold medal – first place	2010 Christchurch
Gold medal – first place	2014 Khanty-Mansiysk
Gold medal – first place	2018 Surgut
Gold medal – first place	2023 Long Beach
FINA World League
Gold medal – first place	2009 Kirishi
Gold medal – first place	2010 La Jolla
Gold medal – first place	2011 Tianjin
Gold medal – first place	2012 Changshu
Gold medal – first place	2014 Kunshan
Gold medal – first place	2015 Shanghai
Gold medal – first place	2016 Shanghai
Gold medal – first place	2017 Shanghai
Gold medal – first place	2018 Kunshan
Gold medal – first place	2019 Budapest
Gold medal – first place	2020 Athens
Bronze medal – third place	2013 Beijing
Bronze medal – third place	2022 Santa Cruz de Tenerife
Pan American Games
Gold medal – first place	2011 Guadalajara	Team
Gold medal – first place	2015 Toronto	Team
Gold medal – first place	2019 Lima	Team
Gold medal – first place	2023 Santiago	Team

Adam Krikorian (born July 22, 1974) is an American water polo coach and has served as the head coach of the United States women's national water polo team. Bringing the U.S. National Women's team to widespread global recognition, he coached the team to three consecutive gold medals, a gold at the 2012 Olympic Games in London, a second gold at the 2016 Olympic Games in Rio de Janeiro, and a third consecutive gold at the 2020 Olympic Games in Tokyo. Highly accomplished as a collegiate coach, he won 15 NCAA national championships as player, assistant coach, and head coach at the University of California Los Angeles.

== Early life ==
Krikorian was born July 22, 1974, in Santa Clara, California, to an Armenian-American family, the youngest son of Gary Krikorian and Joyce (née Srabian). Krikorian is the younger brother of Blake Krikorian and Jason Krikorian, founders of Sling Media. Following his older siblings, Adam's oldest brother Blake played water polo and swam for Mountain View High School, later playing water polo for UCLA. His brother Jason, was also a High School swimmer who later swam for the University of California. Beginning to compete in swimming by age six, Krikorian was a multi-sport athlete by 12, playing soccer, basketball, flag football and baseball. He attended Bubb Elementary and I. N. Graham Middle School in Mountainview, California, but began to play Water Polo at Mountain View High. In Junior High at age 12, Adam swam for the Los Altos Aquatics Club under Coach Ron Usher, averaging 5000 yards once per day, and setting age group records of 26.37 in the 50-yard freestyle, and 1:05.96 in the 100-yard Individual Medley. His coach noted he had good technique, and a particularly strong flutter kick.

== Mountain View High School ==
Krikorian, a water polo and swimming standout, attended Mountain View High School By his Sophomore year at Mountain View High in 1989, Krikorian was a first-team All-League Water Polo player in the Santa Clara Valley Conference, and had made Honorable Mention in the All-Peninsula Water Polo team and First Team in the Santa Clara Valley Conference as a Freshman. Widely recognized for his achievements by his senior year, he scored 113 goals for his High School Water Polo team and was named honorable mention All-America. During his high school career, he helped his team to a National Junior Olympic championship.

== Playing for UCLA ==
Attending UCLA from around 1991-1995 under Water Polo Hall of Fame Coach Guy Baker, as a Senior, Krikorian helped lead the Water Polo team to its first NCAA Championship in 23 years in 1995 scoring two goals during the game. While at UCLA, Krikorian scored a total of 76 goals and was a four-year letter winner (1992–1995). He was named a second team All-America and All-MPSF honoree in 1995. A captain of the UCLA team in 1994 and 1995, he was inducted into the UCLA Athletics Hall of Fame in 2016.

Krikorian married Annicia, a former accomplished tennis player on the UCLA team, with whom he had two children. They live in Manhattan Beach, California.

== UCLA ==
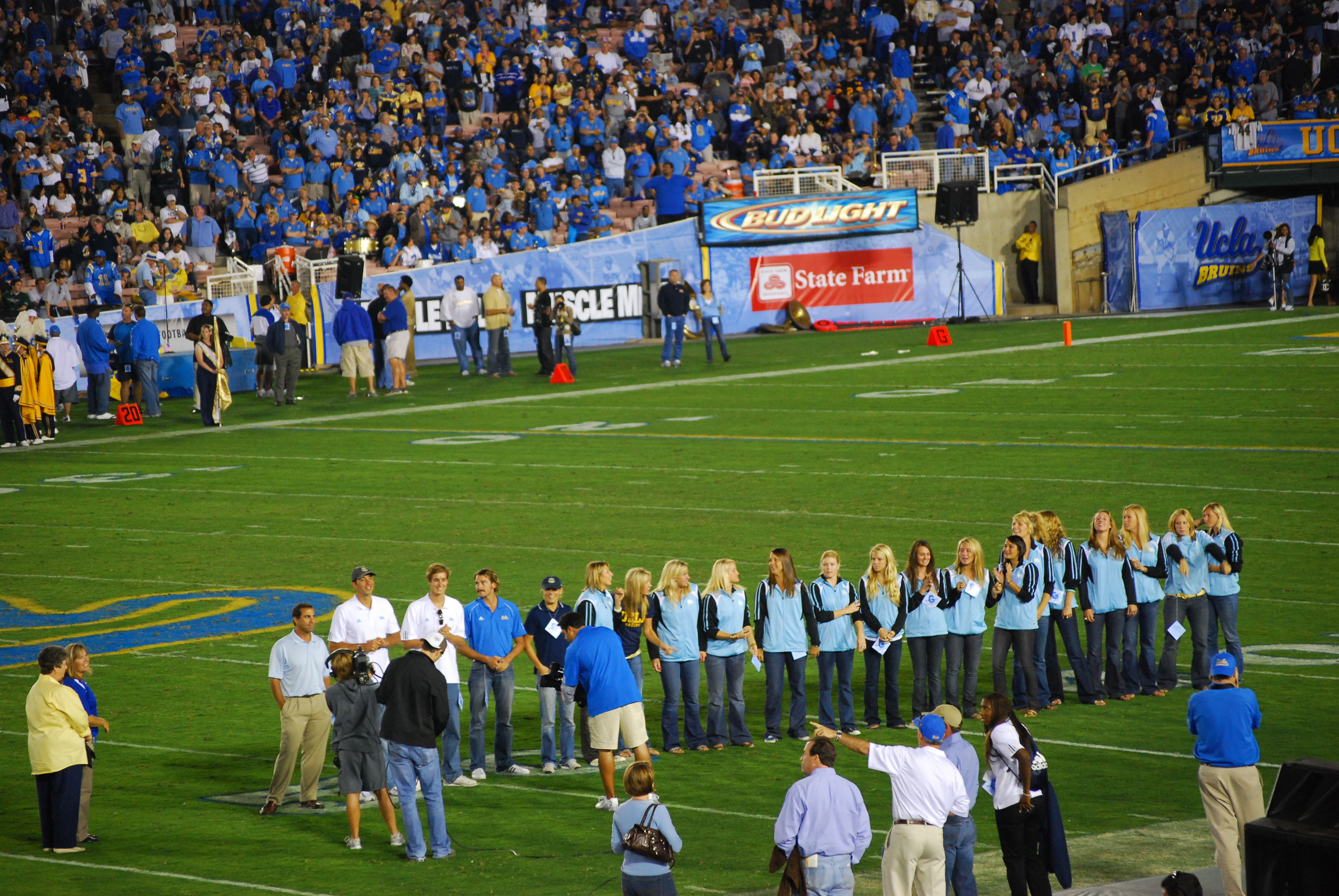
Adam Krikorian (far left) and his UCLA Women's Water Polo team honored for winning UCLA's 100th NCAA Championship, 2007.

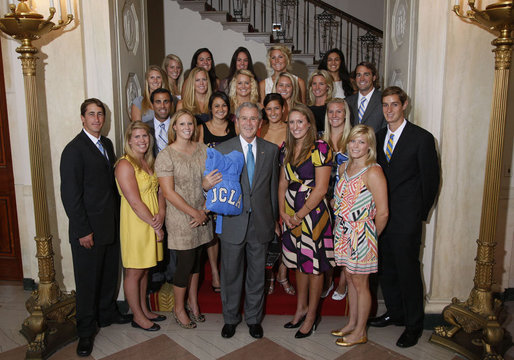
At the White House with his water polo team, June 2008

Mentored in his early coaching career at UCLA by Hall of Fame Coach Guy Baker who had coached him as a player at UCLA, Krikorian became an assistant coach for the UCLA men's water polo team in 1996 and then coached the women's water polo team in 1997. During his coaching career, his UCLA Water Polo teams won 15 national championships, 11 as a head coach, three as an assistant coach and one as a player. As Assistant coach of the UCLA Men's Water Polo, his teams won the NCAA Championship in 1996, and the women's team won titles in 1997 and 1990. While coaching at UCLA, he was recognized as the 2004 national men's water polo coach of the year and the 2001, 2005, 2006 and 2007 national women's water polo coach of the year. For the 2007–08 season, he captured the NCAA Division I Coach of the Year honor for the fifth time as UCLA's head women's water polo coach, given by the Association of Collegiate Water Polo Coaches (ACWPC). "Krikorian led the UCLA women's water polo program to its 11th national championship – the seventh national title in his 10-year tenure as head coach. UCLA registered its second undefeated season in the last four years, posting a 33-0 overall record and perfect 12-0 MPSF mark," according to the UCLA Athletic Department.

The 2007 women's title was UCLA's 100th NCAA championship, the first school in history to achieve the milestone. The 2008 women's team had a perfect 33–0 season, including the three games at the MPSF Championship and the three at the NCAA Championship. Top ranked UCLA beat third-ranked USC 6-3 for the 2008 NCAA Women's Water Polo Championship on May 11, 2008.

He is tied for first among active men's water polo coaches in NCAA championships won and led both teams to national titles in the same season 3 times (’99-’00, ’00-’01, ’04-’05). As men's head coach, he coached 25 All-America selections.

=== Outstanding players ===
Krikorian has coached five Peter J. Cutino Award winners: Sean Kern (2000 and 2001), Coralie Simmons (2001), Natalie Golda (2005), Kelly Rulon (2007), and Courtney Mathewson (2008). The award is given to the outstanding female and male collegiate water polo players each year.

In 2009, Krikorian Was named NCAA Division I Coach of the Year for the fifth consecutive season and sixth time overall by the Association of Collegiate Water Polo Coaches (ACWPC).

=== UCLA Water Polo as National Champions ===
Year	Champions	Position	Winner	Loser	Records (Overall/Conf.)
1995	NCAA Champions	Student-athlete	UCLA Men's Water Polo	Cal	20-6/8-0
1996	NCAA Champions	Asst. Coach	UCLA Men's Water Polo	USC	24-6/6-2
1997	NCAA Champions	Asst. Coach	UCLA Women's Water Polo	Cal	31-1/6-0
1998	NCAA Champions	Asst. Coach	UCLA Women's Water Polo	Cal	35-1/9-0
1999	NCAA Champions	Head coach	UCLA Men's Water Polo	Stanford	22-3/8-0
2000	NCAA Champions	Head coach	UCLA Men's Water Polo	UCSD	19-7/6-2
2000	NCAA Champions	Head coach	UCLA Women's Water Polo	USC	30-5/8-1
2001	NCAA Champions	Head coach	UCLA Women's Water Polo	Stanford	18-4/9-1
2003	NCAA Champions	Head coach	UCLA Women's Water Polo	Stanford	24-4/8-2
2004	NCAA Champions	Head coach	UCLA Men's Water Polo	Stanford	25-3/8-0
2005	NCAA Champions	Head coach	UCLA Women's Water Polo	Stanford	33-0/12-0
2006	NCAA Champions	Head coach	UCLA Women's Water Polo	USC	29-4/11-1
2007	NCAA Champions	Head coach	UCLA Women's Water Polo	Stanford	28-2/11-1
2008	NCAA Champions	Head coach	UCLA Women's Water Polo	USC	33-0/12-0
2009	NCAA Champions	Head coach	UCLA Women's Water Polo	USC	25-6/9-3

== U.S. National Team ==
Taking over for Guy Baker, in March 2009, Krikorian began coaching the Women's U.S. National Water Polo team, soon leading them to the gold medal at the World Championships in Rome, Italy on July 31, 2009, defeating Canada, 6-5.

In October 2011, Adam led the Women's national team to the gold medal at the 2011 Pan American Games in Guadalajara, Mexico.

== Three consecutive gold Olympic team medals ==
As noted earlier, at the 2012 Summer Olympics in London, in an historic victory, his U.S. Women's Water Polo team won the gold medal at the 2012 U.S. Women's Water Polo Team Championship by defeating the team from Spain 8–5 on August 9, 2012, the first U.S. Water Polo Olympic gold medal in program history.

On August 19, 2016, Krikorian led the USA women to their second consecutive gold medal in the 2016 U.S. Women's Water Polo Team Championship} as they defeated Italy by a score of 12–5 in Rio de Janeiro, Brazil. Since breaking through for their first Olympic gold in 2012, the American women's national team have shown dominance in international competition, winning the 2014 World Cup, the 2015 World Championships and three consecutive World League titles in China. In his third consecutive Olympics as head coach,

At the 2020 Tokyo Olympics, the U.S. Women under Krikorian as Head Coach finished with their third consecutive gold medal at the 2020 U.S. Women's Water Polo Team Championship defeating Spain 15–14 in the final round.

At the 2024 Paris Olympics, the U.S. Women's Water Polo team under Krikorian as Head Coach finished fourth and did not medal. Spain took the gold medal, Australia took the Silver, and the Netherlands took the Bronze.

== See also ==
- United States women's Olympic water polo team records and statistics
- List of Olympic champions in women's water polo
- List of world champions in women's water polo
