= Guy Baker =

American water polo player

Current position
- Title: Head coach
- Team: Lamorinda Water Polo Club, Director
- Conference: Mountain Pacific Sports (MPSF)

Biographical details
- Born: 1961 (age 64–65); Riverside, California

Playing career
- 1983-1987: Cal State Long Beach

Coaching career (HC unless noted)
- 1985-1990: Cal State Long Beach; Asst. Coach
- 1991-2000: Univ. Cal. Los Angeles (UCLA)
- 1998-2008: U.S. Women's Water Polo National Team
- 2008-2012: Director of Olympic Development
- 2012-2016: Canadian Women's Nat. Team; Qatar Olympic Team
- 2016-2024+: Director, Lamorinda Water Polo Club

Head coaching record
- Overall: 95-3 UCLA Women (1995-1998)

Accomplishments and honors

Championships
- 7 NCAA titles, 4 Men, 3 Women (UCLA)

Awards
- UCLA Hall of Fame 2014; USA Water Polo Hall of Fame 2018
Medal record
Coach, U.S. National Women's Water Polo
United States
Olympic Games
Silver medal – second place	2000 Sydney	Team competition
Silver medal – second place	2008 Beijing	Team competition
Bronze medal – third place	2004 Athens	Team competition
World Championships
Gold medal – first place	2003 Barcelona	Team competition
Gold medal – first place	2007 Melbourne	Team competition
Silver medal – second place	2005 Montreal	Team competition
FINA Water Polo World League
Gold medal – first place	2007 Montreal	Team competition
Pan American Games
Gold medal – first place	2007 Rio de Janeiro	Team competition

Guy Baker was a head coach for the United States women's national water polo team from 1998-2008. Dominant and consistent on the international stage, under Baker's direction the U.S. National Women's Water Polo team won an Olympic silver medal in Sydney in 2000, a bronze medal in Athens in 2004, and a silver medal in Beijing in 2008. After securing his accomplished record as a U.S. National Women's team Water Polo Coach, he served as the director Of Olympic development for USA Water Polo through 2012, and during his tenure, the U.S. Women's National team captured a gold medal in the 2012 London Summer Olympics under Head Coach Adam Krikorian.

Prior to his time with the Women's U.S. National team, Baker coached a formerly struggling UCLA Water Polo Team from 1991-2000 to seven national NCAA titles, with four men's championships and 3 women's championships. As a result of his record with the U.S. women's team, he became recognized as one of the most successful water polo coaches in Olympic history. In 2018, he was inducted into the USA Water Polo Hall of Fame.

== Early life ==
Guy Baker was born around 1961 in greater Riverside, California, to Ed Baker and Lois Baker Sherman. He attended and graduated Indio High School in 1979, where he was active in sports and became a member of the school's Athletic Hall of Fame. He played basketball, but excelled in Water Polo under Indio High Coach John Lowell, receiving All America honors during his high school years. He played High School water polo with Mike Duran, who became the Indio Water Polo Coach in 2000.

Baker attended Cal-State Long Beach between 1983–87, where he obtained a Bachelor of Arts with a focus on English Language and Literature. Baker was an outstanding water polo player with Cal-State, earning All America honors with the 1983 team.

== Coaching ==
Prior to becoming the head coach for the national team, he was the water polo coach at UCLA from 1991-2000 and coached Water Polo for California State University, Long Beach, from 1985-1990. Baker coached the California State Water Polo team from 1985-1990, including time as both a student coach and Assistant Coach.

=== UCLA Water Polo ===
During his tenure from 1991-2000, Baker coached both the UCLA men's and women's water polo teams to national championships. He began coaching UCLA's first women's program in 1995 with immediate success, leading the women's team to a noteworthy winning record of 95-3 through 1998. Notably, the women's team captured three successive NCAA national titles from 1996-1998. The men's team won the NCAA championship in 1995, 1996, 1999 and 2000. Both of his teams won a national title in the same school year twice (1995–96 and 1996–97), a first for a coach. In his first year at UCLA, he was named American Water Polo Coaches Association Coach of the Year for leading the men's water polo team to a second-place finish in the NCAA tournament.

=== U.S. National Women's team ===
Baker initially accepted a position as an Assistant coach with the U.S. Women's National team in 1992, later serving as a Head Coach from March 1998 – 2008. Despite being rated eighth in the World in 1998, during Baker's tenure as Head coach the U.S. women's Olympic teams won a silver medal in the 2000 Sydney Olympics placing second to Australia in the final round with a score of 4-3, with Baker's parents in attendance. The U.S. Women's team won a bronze in the 2004 Athens Olympics, defeating Australia, and won a silver medal in Beijing championship game in 2008, losing to the women's team from the Netherlands in the final game, 9-8. After the women's silver medal victory in the 2008 Olympics, USA Water Polo commented that "Head Coach Guy Baker has presided over one of the most dominating runs for women’s water polo the last eight years plus and with 10 first time Olympians on the roster the future looks very bright for this group," according to USA Water Polo.

=== Director Olympic Development ===
After his time as a U.S. National Women's team Water Polo Coach, he served as the director Of Olympic development for USA Water Polo through 2012. Under his tenure as a director, the U.S. Women's Olympic team won a gold medal in London in 2012, beating the Women's Water Polo team from Italy 8-6 in the finals. Continuing to excel with their new head coach Adam Krikorian, who had played Water Polo for Baker at UCLA and mentored him as a U.S. National Women's Team coach, the U.S. Women's Olympic Water Polo team defeated the Italian team 12-5, capturing the gold medal in the Olympic final game in Rio de Janeiro in 2016. Continuing their winning streak under Coach Krikorian, the U.S. women's Water Polo team won the gold again in 2020 in Tokyo.

From 2012-2016, Baker served first as a Coach for the Canadian Women's Nat. Team for two years, and than served in a development role with the Qatar Olympic Water Polo Team.

=== Lamorinda Water Polo Club ===
In 2016, Baker accepted a position as a Girls’ Program consultant and primary coach for the 12u Girls’ Program at Lamorinda Water Polo Club. He expanded his coaching responsibilities to the Boy's program in 2024, and served as an executive director. During his tenure, he led the girls' team to a third place in the Junior Olympics in 2022, a first place in the Cal Cup State Finals in 2023, and another third place in the Junior Olympics in 2023.

=== Honors ===
Baker was inducted into the UCLA Athletics Hall of Fame on October 11, 2014, and the USA Water Polo Hall of Fame in 2018.

== See also ==
- United States women's Olympic water polo team records and statistics
- List of world champions in women's water polo
