= Water polo at the 2003 World Aquatics Championships =

The water polo events at the 2003 World Aquatics Championships were held from 13 to 26 July 2003, in Barcelona, Spain.

== Medal summary ==
=== Medal table ===
Rank	Nation	Gold	Silver	Bronze	Total
1	Hungary (HUN)	1	0	0	1
1	United States (USA)	1	0	0	1
3	Italy (ITA)	0	2	0	2
4	Russia (RUS)	0	0	1	1
4	Serbia and Montenegro (SCG)	0	0	1	1
Totals (5 entries)		2	2	2	6

=== Medalists ===
Event	Gold	Silver	Bronze
Men	Hungary Tibor Benedek; Péter Biros; Rajmund Fodor; István Gergely; Tamás Kásás; Gergely Kiss; Norbert Madaras; Tamás Molnár; Barnabás Steinmetz; Zoltán Szécsi; Tamás Varga; Zsolt Varga; Attila Vári Head coach Dénes Kemény	Italy Alberto Angelini; Fabio Bencivenga; Fabrizio Buonocore; Alessandro Calcaterra; Roberto Calcaterra; Maurizio Felugo; Goran Fiorentini; Marco Gerini; Andrea Mangiante; Francesco Postiglione; Bogdan Rath; Carlo Silipo; Stefano Tempesti Head coach Paolo de Crescenzo	Serbia and Montenegro Aleksandar Ćirić; Vladimir Gojković; Danilo Ikodinović; Viktor Jelenić; Predrag Jokić; Nikola Kuljača; Slobodan Nikić; Aleksandar Šapić; Dejan Savić; Denis Šefik; Vanja Udovičić; Vladimir Vujasinović; Boris Zloković Head coach Nenad Manojlović
Women	United States Nicolle Payne; Heather Petri; Ericka Lorenz; Brenda Villa; Ellen Estes; Natalie Golda; Margaret Dingeldein; Jacqueline Frank; Heather Moody; Robin Beauregard; Amber Stachowski; Gabrielle Domanic; Thalia Munro Head coach Guy Baker	Italy Francesca Conti; Martina Miceli; Carmela Allucci; Silvia Bosurgi; Erika Lava; Manuela Zanchi; Tania di Mario; Cinzia Ragusa; Giusi Malato; Alexandra Araujo; Maddalena Musumeci; Melania Grego; Noémi Tóth Head coach Pierluigi Formiconi	Russia Valentina Vorontsova; Natalya Shepelina; Yekaterina Salimova; Sofia Konoukh; Yelena Smurova; Galina Zlotnikova; Anastassia Zoubkova; Veronika Linkova; Tatiana Petrova; Olga Turova; Ekaterina Shishova; Svetlana Bogdanova; Maria Yaina Head coach Yury Mitianin
