= Italy women's national water polo team =

Italy
- FINA code: ITA
- Association: Italian Swimming Federation
- Confederation: LEN (Europe)
- Head coach: Carlo Silipo
- Asst coach: Cosimino Di Cecca; Elena Gigli
- Captain: Agnese Cocchiere

FINA ranking (since 2008)
- Current: 10 (as of 9 August 2021)
- Highest: 2 (2016)
- Lowest: 10 (2021)

Olympic Games (team statistics)
- Appearances: 5 (first in 2004)
- Best result: (gold) (2004)

World Championship
- Appearances: 16 (first in 1994)
- Best result: (gold) (1998, 2001)

World Cup
- Appearances: 11 (first in 1989)
- Best result: (silver) (1993, 2006)

World League
- Appearances: 10 (first in 2004)
- Best result: (silver) (2006, 2011, 2014, 2019)

European Championship
- Appearances: 19 (first in 1989)
- Best result: (gold) (1995, 1997, 1999, 2003, 2012)

Media
- Website: federnuoto.it

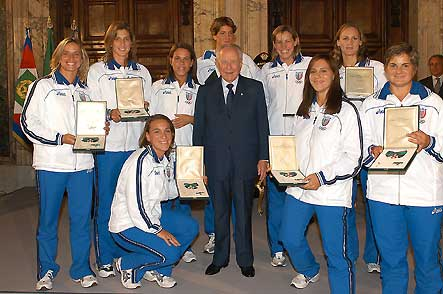
Tania Di Mario (3rd standing from left) and Setterosa, with Italian President Carlo Azeglio Ciampi after Olympic gold medal at Quirinale in 2004.

The Italy women's national water polo team represents Italy in international women's water polo competitions and friendly matches. The team is one of the leading teams in Europe since the mid-1990s, claiming the title at the 2004 Summer Olympics in Athens, Greece. The squad is nicknamed the "Setterosa" (lit. 'Pink Seven', a pun on Settebello, the nickname of the male team).

== Palmarès ==
Competition	1st place, gold medalist(s)	2nd place, silver medalist(s)	3rd place, bronze medalist(s)	Total
Olympic Games	1	1	0	2
World Championship	2	1	3	6
World Cup	0	2	1	3
World League	0	4	1	5
European Championship	5	2	2	9
Universiade	0	1	1	2
Mediterranean Games	0	1	0	1
Total	8	12	8	28

== Results ==
=== Olympic Games ===
Year	Position	Pld	W	D	L
(Australia) 2000	did not qualify				
(Greece) 2004	1st place, gold medalist(s)	6	5	0	1
(China) 2008	6th	5	2	2	1
(United Kingdom) 2012	7th	6	2	0	4
(Brazil) 2016	2nd place, silver medalist(s)	6	5	0	1
(Japan) 2020	did not qualify				
(France) 2024	6th	7	2	1	4
Total	5/6	30	16	3	11

=== Olympic Year Tournament ===
- 1996 – (bronze) Bronze medal

=== World Championship ===
- 1994 – (bronze) Bronze medal
- 1998 – (gold) Gold medal
- 2001 – (gold) Gold medal
- 2003 – (silver) Silver medal
- 2005 – 7th place
- 2007 – 5th place
- 2011 – 4th place
- 2013 – 10th place
- 2015 – (bronze) Bronze medal
- 2017 – 6th place
- 2019 – 6th place
- 2022 – 4th place
- 2023 – (bronze) Bronze medal
- 2024 – 7th place
- 2025 – 7th place

=== FINA World Cup ===
- 1989 – 8th place
- 1991 – 5th place
- 1993 – (silver) Silver medal
- 1995 – 5th place
- 1997 – 4th place
- 1999 – (bronze) Bronze medal
- 2002 – 5th place
- 2006 – (silver) Silver medal
- 2023 – 6th place
- 2025 – 6th place
- 2026 – 6th place

=== FINA World League ===
- 2004 – (bronze) Bronze medal
- 2005 – 8th place
- 2006 – (silver) Silver medal
- 2009 – 8th place
- 2011 – (silver) Silver medal
- 2012 – 8th place
- 2013 – 6th place
- 2014 – (silver) Silver medal
- 2015 – 7th place
- 2016 – 5th place
- 2022 – 5th place

=== European Championship ===
- 1989 – 4th place
- 1991 – (bronze) Bronze medal
- 1993 – 4th place
- 1995 – (gold) Gold medal
- 1997 – (gold) Gold medal
- 1999 – (gold) Gold medal
- 2001 – (silver) Silver medal
- 2003 – (gold) Gold medal
- 2006 – (silver) Silver medal
- 2008 – 4th place
- 2010 – 4th place
- 2012 – (gold) Gold medal
- 2014 – 4th place
- 2016 – (bronze) Bronze medal
- 2018 – 6th place
- 2020 – 5th place
- 2022 – (bronze) Bronze medal
- 2024 – 4th place
- 2026 – 4th place

=== LEN Europa Cup ===
Year	Position
(Spain) 2018	5th place

== Team ==
=== Current squad ===
Roster for the 2025 World Championships.

Head coach: Carlo Silipo

- 1 Aurora Condorelli GK
- 2 Morena Leone FP
- 3 Paola di Maria FP
- 4 Sara Cordovani FP
- 5 Veronica Gant FP
- 6 Lucrezia Cergol FP
- 7 Sofia Giustini FP
- 8 Roberta Bianconi FP
- 9 Dafne Bettini FP
- 10 Chiara Ranalli FP
- 11 Agnese Cocchiere FP
- 12 Gaia Gagliardi FP
- 13 Helga Maria Santapaola GK
- 14 Alessia Millo FP
- 15 Carlotta Meggiato FP

=== Past squads ===
- 1991 European Championship – Bronze Medal

- Nicoletta Abbate, Carmela Allucci, Monica Canetti, Cristina Consoli, Francesca Conti, Antonella Di Giacinto, Stefania Lariucci, Sonia Magarelli, Giusi Malato, Neira Marsili, Martina Miceli, Monica Petrucci, Monica Vaillant, Flavia Villa, and Claudia Vinciguerra. Head Coach: Roberto Fiori.

- 1993 FINA World Cup – Silver Medal

- Nicoletta Abbate, Carmela Allucci, Cristina Consoli, Francesca Conti, Antonella Di Giacinto, Melania Grego, Stefania Lariucci, Giusi Malato, Claudia Mori, Paola Sabbatini, Greta Righi, Monica Vaillant, and Claudia Vinciguerra.

- 1994 World Championship – Bronze Medal

- Nicoletta Abbate, Carmela Allucci, Cristina Consoli, Francesca Conti, Antonella Di Giacinto, Melania Grego, Stefania Lariucci, Giusi Malato, Martina Miceli, Paola Sabbatini, Oriana Di Siena, Monica Vaillant, and Milena Virzì.

- 1995 European Championship – Gold Medal

- Carmela Allucci, Marica Carrozzi, Cristina Consoli, Francesca Conti, Antonella Di Giacinto, Melania Grego, Stefania Lariucci, Giusi Malato, Martina Miceli, Maddalena Musumeci, Francesca Romano, Paola Sabbatini, Daria Starace, Monica Vaillant, and Milena Virzì. Head Coach: Pierluigi Formiconi.

- 1996 Olympic Year Tournament – Bronze Medal

- Carmela Allucci, Alexandra Araujo, Cristina Consoli, Francesca Conti, Antonella Di Giacinto, Melania Grego, Stefania Lariucci, Giusi Malato, Martina Miceli, Silvia Moriconi, Maddalena Musumeci, Monica Vaillant, and Milena Virzì. Head Coach: Pierluigi Formiconi.

- 1997 European Championship – Gold Medal

- Carmela Allucci, Alexandra Araujo, Cristina Consoli, Francesca Conti, Antonella Di Giacinto, Melania Grego, Stefania Lariucci, Stefania Lavorini, Giusi Malato, Martina Miceli, Silvia Moriconi, Maddalena Musumeci, Cinzia Ragusa, Monica Vaillant, and Milena Virzì. Head Coach: Pierluigi Formiconi.

- 1998 World Championship – Gold Medal

- Carmela Allucci, Alexandra Araujo, Cristina Consoli, Francesca Conti, Eleonora Gay, Antonella Di Giacinto, Melania Grego, Stefania Lariucci, Giusi Malato, Martina Miceli, Maddalena Musumeci, Monica Vaillant, and Milena Virzi. Head Coach: Pierluigi Formiconi.

- 1999 FINA World Cup – Bronze Medal

- Carmela Allucci, Alexandra Araujo, Tatiana Baianova, Cristina Consoli, Francesca Conti, Eleonora Gay, Melania Grego, Tania di Mario, Martina Miceli, Maddalena Musumeci, Gabriella Sciolti, Monica Vaillant, and Claudia Vinciguerra. Head Coach: Pierluigi Formiconi.

- 1999 European Championship – Gold Medal

- Carmela Allucci, Alexandra Araujo, Tatiana Baianova, Silvia Bosurgi, Cristina Consoli, Francesca Conti, Tania di Mario, Melania Grego, Giusi Malato, Martina Miceli, Silvia Moriconi, Maddalena Musumeci, Martina Schiavon, Gabriella Sciolti, and Monica Vaillant. Head Coach: Pierluigi Formiconi.

- 2001 European Championship – Silver Medal

- Simona Abbate, Carmela Allucci, Alexandra Araujo, Silvia Bosurgi, Cristina Consoli, Francesca Conti, Melania Grego, Tania Di Mario, Giusi Malato, Martina Miceli, Maddalena Musumeci, Cinzia Ragusa, Gabriella Sciolti, Paola Sabbatini, and Manuela Zanchi. Head Coach: Pierluigi Formiconi.

- 2001 World Championship – Gold Medal

- Carmela Allucci, Alexandra Araujo, Silvia Bosurgi, Cristina Consoli, Francesca Conti, Melania Grego, Giusi Malato, Tania di Mario, Martina Miceli, Maddalena Musumeci, Paola Sabbatini, Gabriella Sciolti, and Monica Vaillant. Head Coach: Pierluigi Formiconi.

- 2001 Holiday Cup – Bronze Medal

- Carmela Allucci, Alexandra Araujo, Silvia Bosurgi, Francesca Conti, Cristina Consoli, Melania Grego, Giusi Malato, Tania di Mario, Martina Miceli, Maddalena Musumeci, Paola Sabbatini, Gabriella Sciolti, and Monica Vaillant.

- 2003 European Championship – Gold Medal

- Carmela Allucci, Alexandra Araujo, Silvia Bosurgi, Francesca Conti, Melania Grego, Erika Lava, Daniela Lavorini, Giusi Malato, Tania di Mario, Martina Miceli, Maddalena Musumeci, Cinzia Ragusa, Gabriella Sciolti, Noémi Tóth, and Manuela Zanchi.

- 2003 World Championship – Silver Medal

- Carmela Allucci, Alexandra Araujo, Silvia Bosurgi, Francesca Conti, Melania Grego, Erika Lava, Giusi Malato, Tania di Mario, Martina Miceli, Maddalena Musumeci, Cinzia Ragusa, Noémi Tóth, and Manuela Zanchi.

- 2003 Holiday Cup – Silver Medal

- Carmela Allucci, Alexandra Araujo, Silvia Bosurgi, Francesca Conti, Elena Gigli, Melania Grego, Daniela Lavorini, Tania di Mario, Martina Miceli, Maddalena Musumeci, Cinzia Ragusa, Gabriella Sciolti, Noémi Tóth, and Manuela Zanchi.

- 2004 Olympic Qualifying Tournament

- Carmela Allucci, Alexandra Araujo, Silvia Bosurgi, Francesca Conti, Elena Gigli, Melania Grego, Giusi Malato, Tania di Mario, Martina Miceli, Maddalena Musumeci, Cinzia Ragusa, Noémi Tóth, and Manuela Zanchi.

- 2004 FINA World League – Bronze Medal

- Carmela Allucci, Francesca Conti, Martina Miceli, Silvia Bosurgi, Erika Lava, Manuela Zanchi, Tania di Mario, Cinzia Ragusa, Giusi Malato, Alexandra Araujo, Maddalena Musumeci, Melania Grego, Noémi Tóth, and Simona Abbate.

- 2004 Holiday Cup – Silver Medal

- Carmela Allucci, Francesca Conti, Martina Miceli, Silvia Bosurgi, Erika Lava, Manuela Zanchi, Tania di Mario, Cinzia Ragusa, Giusi Malato, Alexandra Araujo, Maddalena Musumeci, Melania Grego, Noémi Tóth, and Simona Abbate.

- 2004 Olympic Games – Gold Medal

- Carmela Allucci, Francesca Conti, Martina Miceli, Silvia Bosurgi, Elena Gigli, Manuela Zanchi, Tania di Mario, Cinzia Ragusa, Giusi Malato, Alexandra Araujo, Maddalena Musumeci, Melania Grego, and Noémi Tóth.

- 2006 FINA World League – Silver Medal

- Eleonora Gay, Martina Miceli, Francesca Pavan, Silvia Bosurgi, Erzsébet Valkai, Manuela Zanchi, Tania di Mario, Cinzia Ragusa, Daria Storace, Federica Rocco, Maddalena Musumeci, Teresa Frassinetti, and Elena Gigli.

- 2006 FINA World Cup – Silver Medal

- Silvia Bosurgi, Eleonora Gay, Elena Gigli, Teresa Frassinetti, Tania di Mario, Martina Miceli, Maddalena Musumeci, Francesca Pavan, Cinzia Ragusa, Federica Rocco, Daria Starace, Erzsébet Valkai, and Manuela Zanchi.

- 2006 European Championship – Silver Medal

- Silvia Bosurgi, Chiara Brancati, Teresa Frassinetti, Arianna Garibotti, Elena Gigli, Allegra Lapi, Tania di Mario, Martina Miceli, Maddalena Musumeci, Francesca Pavan, Federica Radicchi, Cinzia Ragusa, Federica Rocco, Erzsébet Valkai, and Manuela Zanchi.

- 2007 Holiday Cup – Gold Medal

- Annalisa Bosello, Silvia Bosurgi, Elisa Casanova, Marta Colaiocco, Teresa Frassinetti, Eleonora Gay, Elena Gigli, Tania di Mario, Martina Miceli, Maddalena Musumeci, Francesca Pavan, Cinzia Ragusa, Erzsébet Valkai, and Manuela Zanchi. Head Coach: Mauro Maugeri.

- 2008 FINA Olympic Qualifying Tournament – Gold Medal

- Elena Gigli, Martina Miceli, Elisa Casanova, Silvia Bosurgi, Erzsébet Valkai, Manuela Zanchi, Tania di Mario, Cinzia Ragusa, Marta Colaiocco, Federica Rocco, Maddalena Musumeci, Teresa Frassinetti, and Chiara Brancati. Head Coach: Mauro Maugeri.

- 2012 European Championship – Gold Medal

- Elena Gigli, Simona Abbate, Elisa Casanova, Rosaria Aiello, Elisa Queirolo, Allegra Lapi, Tania Di Mario, Roberta Bianconi, Giulia Emmolo, Giulia Rambaldi, Aleksandra Cotti, Teresa Frassinetti and Giulia Gorlero. Head Coach: Fabio Conti.

- 2015 World Championship – Bronze Medal

- Giulia Gorlero, Chiara Tabani, Arianna Garibotti, Elisa Queirolo, Federica Radicchi, Rosaria Aiello, Tania di Mario, Roberta Bianconi, Giulia Emmolo, Francesca Pomeri, Laura Barzon, Teresa Frassinetti, and Laura Teani. Head Coach: Fabio Conti.

- 2016 European Championship – Bronze Medal

- Giulia Gorlero, Chiara Tabani, Arianna Garibotti, Elisa Queirolo, Federica Radicchi, Rosaria Aiello, Tania di Mario, Roberta Bianconi, Giulia Emmolo, Francesca Pomeri, Aleksandra Cotti, Teresa Frassinetti, and Laura Teani. Head Coach: Fabio Conti.

== Under-20 team ==
Italy lastly competed at the 2021 FINA Junior Water Polo World Championships where they finished fourth.

== See also ==
- Italy women's Olympic water polo team records and statistics
- Italy men's national water polo team
- List of Olympic champions in women's water polo
- List of women's Olympic water polo tournament records and statistics
- List of world champions in women's water polo
