= 2012 Women's European Water Polo Championship squads =

This article shows all participating team squads at the 2012 Women's European Water Polo Championship held at the Pieter van den Hoogenband Swim Stadium in Eindhoven, the Netherlands, from 18 to 28 January 2012.

== Germany ==
No.	Name	Date of birth	Position	L/R	Height	Weight
1	Bianca Ahrens	9 January 1991	goalkeeper	R	1.71 m (5 ft 7 in)	70 kg (150 lb)
2	Jasmin Krieter	11 November 1988		L	1.76 m (5 ft 9 in)	67 kg (148 lb)
3	Tatjana Steinhauer	23 April 1991		L	1.81 m (5 ft 11 in)	79 kg (174 lb)
4	Bianca Seyfert	15 August 1993		R	1.74 m (5 ft 9 in)	64 kg (141 lb)
5	Claudia Blomenkamp	30 December 1986		R	1.80 m (5 ft 11 in)	84 kg (185 lb)
6	Anja Seyfert	9 April 1990		R	1.66 m (5 ft 5 in)	63 kg (139 lb)
7	Monika Kruszona	4 August 1985		L	1.80 m (5 ft 11 in)	75 kg (165 lb)
8	Claudia Kern	28 January 1990		R	1.74 m (5 ft 9 in)	68 kg (150 lb)
9	Jennifer Stiefel	13 July 1992		R	1.70 m (5 ft 7 in)	68 kg (150 lb)
10	Nina Wengst	20 March 1979		R	1.75 m (5 ft 9 in)	80 kg (180 lb)
11	Carmen Gelse	22 September 1987		R	1.76 m (5 ft 9 in)	71 kg (157 lb)
12	Mandy Zöllner	17 April 1985		R	1.70 m (5 ft 7 in)	62 kg (137 lb)
13	Jana Lueg	10 August 1990	goalkeeper	R	1.65 m (5 ft 5 in)	60 kg (130 lb)

== Great Britain ==
No.	Name	Date of birth	Position	L/R	Height	Weight
1	Robyn Nicholls	8 May 1990	goalkeeper			
2	Chloe Wilcox	20 December 1986				
3	Fiona McCann	13 May 1987				
4	Francesca Snell	28 March 1987				
5	Alexandra Rutlidge	12 November 1988				
6	Frances Leighton	30 March 1982				
7	Victoria Hawkins	12 June 1984				
8	Ciara Gibson-Byrne	3 December 1992				
9	Lisa Gibson	12 August 1989				
10	Angela Winstanley-Smith	5 August 1985				
11	Francesca Clayton	7 January 1990				
12	Rebecca Kershaw	11 August 1990				
13	Rosemary Morris	31 January 1986	goalkeeper			

== Greece ==
No.	Name	Date of birth	Position	L/R	Height	Weight
1	Eleni Kouvdou	9 August 1989	goalkeeper	R	1.72 m (5 ft 8 in)	63 kg (139 lb)
2	Christina Tsoukala	8 July 1991		R	1.85 m (6 ft 1 in)	78 kg (172 lb)
3	Antiopi Melidoni	11 October 1977		R	1.72 m (5 ft 8 in)	65 kg (143 lb)
4	Ilektra Psouni	12 September 1985		R	1.69 m (5 ft 7 in)	63 kg (139 lb)
5	Kyriaki Liosi	30 October 1979		R	1.70 m (5 ft 7 in)	63 kg (139 lb)
6	Alkisti Avramidou	26 February 1988		R	1.70 m (5 ft 7 in)	59 kg (130 lb)
7	Alexandra Asimaki	28 June 1988		R	1.70 m (5 ft 7 in)	64 kg (141 lb)
8	Antigoni Roumpesi	19 July 1983		R	1.78 m (5 ft 10 in)	80 kg (180 lb)
9	Angeliki Gerolymou	22 June 1982		R	1.70 m (5 ft 7 in)	70 kg (150 lb)
10	Triantafyllia Manolioudaki	19 March 1986		R	1.70 m (5 ft 7 in)	62 kg (137 lb)
11	Stavroula Antonakou	2 May 1982		R	1.70 m (5 ft 7 in)	58 kg (128 lb)
12	Georgia Lara	31 May 1980		R	1.75 m (5 ft 9 in)	79 kg (174 lb)
13	Chrysoula Diamantopoulou	22 September 1995	goalkeeper	R	1.83 m (6 ft 0 in)	70 kg (150 lb)

== Hungary ==
No.	Name	Date of birth	Position	L/R	Height	Weight
1	Flora Bolonyai	5 April 1991	goalkeeper	R	1.80 m (5 ft 11 in)	70 kg (150 lb)
2	Dora Csabai	20 April 1989		R	1.75 m (5 ft 9 in)	64 kg (141 lb)
3	Dora Antal	9 September 1993		R	1.68 m (5 ft 6 in)	60 kg (130 lb)
4	Hanna Anna Kisteleki	10 March 1991		L	1.79 m (5 ft 10 in)	67 kg (148 lb)
5	Gabriella Szucs	7 March 1988		R	1.83 m (6 ft 0 in)	75 kg (165 lb)
6	Orsolya Takacs	20 May 1985		R	1.90 m (6 ft 3 in)	85 kg (187 lb)
7	Rita Dravucz	14 April 1980		R	1.80 m (5 ft 11 in)	67 kg (148 lb)
8	Rita Keszthelyi	10 December 1991		R	1.77 m (5 ft 10 in)	67 kg (148 lb)
9	Ildiko Toth	23 April 1987		R	1.74 m (5 ft 9 in)	72 kg (159 lb)
10	Barbara Bujka	5 September 1986		L	1.79 m (5 ft 10 in)	85 kg (187 lb)
11	Anna Krisztina Illes	21 February 1994		R	1.80 m (5 ft 11 in)	73 kg (161 lb)
12	Kata Maria Menczinger	17 January 1989		R	1.78 m (5 ft 10 in)	69 kg (152 lb)
13	Edina Gangl	25 June 1990	goalkeeper	R	1.81 m (5 ft 11 in)	68 kg (150 lb)

== Italy ==
No.	Name	Date of birth	Position	L/R	Height	Weight
1	Elena Gigli	9 July 1985	goalkeeper	R	1.90 m (6 ft 3 in)	75 kg (165 lb)
2	Simona Abbate	22 August 1983		R	1.73 m (5 ft 8 in)	64 kg (141 lb)
3	Elisa Casanova	26 November 1973		L	1.86 m (6 ft 1 in)	100 kg (220 lb)
4	Rosaria Aiello	12 May 1989		R	1.71 m (5 ft 7 in)	76 kg (168 lb)
5	Elisa Queirolo	6 March 1991		R		
6	Allegra Lapi	8 September 1985		R	1.65 m (5 ft 5 in)	54 kg (119 lb)
7	Tania Di Mario	4 May 1979		R	1.66 m (5 ft 5 in)	60 kg (130 lb)
8	Roberta Bianconi	8 July 1989		R	1.75 m (5 ft 9 in)	73 kg (161 lb)
9	Giulia Enrica Emmolo	16 October 1991		L	1.71 m (5 ft 7 in)	66 kg (146 lb)
10	Giulia Rambaldi Guidasci	11 November 1986		R	1.78 m (5 ft 10 in)	67 kg (148 lb)
11	Aleksandra Cotti	13 December 1988		R	1.66 m (5 ft 5 in)	64 kg (141 lb)
12	Teresa Frassinetti	24 December 1985		R	1.77 m (5 ft 10 in)	70 kg (150 lb)
13	Giulia Gorlero	26 September 1990	goalkeeper	R	1.79 m (5 ft 10 in)	70 kg (150 lb)

== Netherlands ==
No.	Name	Date of birth	Position	L/R	Height	Weight
1	Ilse Van Der Meijden	22 October 1988	goalkeeper	R	1.86 m (6 ft 1 in)	
2	Yasemin Smit	21 November 1984		R	1.79 m (5 ft 10 in)	
3	Mieke Cabout	30 March 1986		R	1.82 m (6 ft 0 in)	
4	Biurakn Hakhverdian	4 October 1985		R	1.72 m (5 ft 8 in)	
5	Sabrina van der Sloot	16 March 1991		R	1.74 m (5 ft 9 in)	
6	Nomi Stomphorst	23 August 1992		R	1.72 m (5 ft 8 in)	
7	Iefke Van Belkum	22 July 1986		R	1.85 m (6 ft 1 in)	
8	Robbin Remers	20 August 1991		R	1.79 m (5 ft 10 in)	
9	Vivian Sevenich	28 February 1993		L	1.79 m (5 ft 10 in)	
10	Nienke Vermeer	18 July 1989		R	1.85 m (6 ft 1 in)	
11	Lieke Klaassen	23 April 1991		R	1.82 m (6 ft 0 in)	
12	Harriet Cabout	26 August 1989		R	1.75 m (5 ft 9 in)	
13	Anne Heinis	20 May 1987	goalkeeper	R	1.75 m (5 ft 9 in)	

== Russia ==
No.	Name	Date of birth	Position	L/R	Height	Weight
1	Maria Kovtunovskaya	19 December 1988	goalkeeper	R	1.78 m (5 ft 10 in)	65 kg (143 lb)
2	Nadezhda Fedotova	20 May 1988		R	1.75 m (5 ft 9 in)	65 kg (143 lb)
3	Ekaterina Prokofyeva	13 March 1991		R	1.76 m (5 ft 9 in)	65 kg (143 lb)
4	Sofya Konukh	9 March 1980		R	1.80 m (5 ft 11 in)	68 kg (150 lb)
5	Victoria Kurochkina	5 August 1992		R	1.71 m (5 ft 7 in)	62 kg (137 lb)
6	Olga Belova	27 August 1993		R	1.68 m (5 ft 6 in)	59 kg (130 lb)
7	Ekaterina Lisunova	6 October 1989		R	1.76 m (5 ft 9 in)	65 kg (143 lb)
8	Evgeniia Khokhriakova	26 August 1988		R	1.80 m (5 ft 11 in)	70 kg (150 lb)
9	Ekaterina Tankeeva	28 June 1989		R	1.74 m (5 ft 9 in)	75 kg (165 lb)
10	Olga Beliaeva	18 March 1985		R	1.76 m (5 ft 9 in)	72 kg (159 lb)
11	Evgeniya Ivanova	26 July 1987		R	1.76 m (5 ft 9 in)	66 kg (146 lb)
12	Diana Antonova	17 January 1993		R	1.73 m (5 ft 8 in)	60 kg (130 lb)
13	Anna Karnaukh	31 August 1993	goalkeeper	R	1.70 m (5 ft 7 in)	64 kg (141 lb)

== Spain ==
No.	Name	Date of birth	Position	L/R	Height	Weight
1	Laura Ester	22 January 1990	goalkeeper	R	1.71 m (5 ft 7 in)	57 kg (126 lb)
2	Paula Chillida	19 August 1994		R	1.77 m (5 ft 10 in)	59 kg (130 lb)
3	Anna Espar	8 January 1993		R	1.78 m (5 ft 10 in)	65 kg (143 lb)
4	Roser Tarrago	25 March 1993		R	1.71 m (5 ft 7 in)	58 kg (128 lb)
5	Matilde Ortiz	16 September 1990		R	1.74 m (5 ft 9 in)	66 kg (146 lb)
6	Jennifer Pareja	8 May 1984		R	1.75 m (5 ft 9 in)	63 kg (139 lb)
7	Lorena Miranda	7 April 1991		R	1.74 m (5 ft 9 in)	77 kg (170 lb)
8	Pilar Peña	4 April 1986		L	1.73 m (5 ft 8 in)	60 kg (130 lb)
9	Andrea Blas	14 February 1992		R	1.73 m (5 ft 8 in)	77 kg (170 lb)
10	Ona Meseguer	20 February 1988		L	1.67 m (5 ft 6 in)	63 kg (139 lb)
11	Maica García Godoy	17 October 1990		L	1.87 m (6 ft 2 in)	88 kg (194 lb)
12	Laura López	13 January 1988		R	1.79 m (5 ft 10 in)	76 kg (168 lb)
13	Patricia Herrera	9 February 1993	goalkeeper	R	1.65 m (5 ft 5 in)	63 kg (139 lb)
