= Water polo at the 2004 Summer Olympics – Women's tournament =

Women's water polo at the Games of the XXVIII Olympiad

Tournament details
- Host country: Greece
- City: Athens
- Venue(s): Athens Olympic Aquatic Centre
- Dates: 16–26 August 2004
- Teams: 8 (from 4 confederations)
- Competitors: 101

Final positions
- Champions: Italy (1st title)
- Runners-up: Greece
- Third place: United States
- Fourth place: Australia

Tournament statistics
- Matches: 20
- Goals scored: 261 (13.05 per match)
- Top scorer(s): (Italy) Tania Di Mario (14 goals in 6 matches)
- Most saves: (United States) Jacqueline Frank (41 saves in 5 matches)
- Top sprinter(s): (Greece) Kyriaki Liosi (21 sprints won in 6 matches)
- MVP: (Italy) Tania Di Mario

The women's water polo tournament at the 2004 Summer Olympics was contested between August 16 and August 26 at the Olympic Aquatic Centre in the Athens Olympic Sports Complex. Eight teams qualified for the Games, with Italy defeating the host nation Greece for the gold medal. The United States won the bronze medal.

== Format ==
The eight qualifying teams were split into two groups of four for the preliminary round, which was played in a round-robin format. The top teams in each group advanced directly to the semi-finals, while second and third place teams advanced to the quarter-finals. Classification matches were also played to determine the final ranking for all teams.

== Background and qualification ==
The women's water polo tournament at the 2004 Summer Olympics was the second time that the tournament was held at the Olympic Games with the previous tournament being held in 2000.

Fifteen teams competed in qualifying for the seven spots. Despite it originally being the winner per continent, the format would only see two continental champions with the United States and Kazakhstan qualifying from their continent. The remaining four spots (Australia got an bye from being the Oceania champions) was then held at the qualifier which was held in Imperia, Italy. The top three teams from the event qualified through to the Olympics Games (Hungary, Italy and Russia) while Canada also got through on the basis of being the replacement for the African team.

Event	Dates	Hosts	Quota	Qualifier(s)
Host nation	—N/a	—N/a	1	Greece
2003 Pan American Games	3–10 August 2003	Dominican Republic	1	United States
Asian Qualification Tournament	22–24 September 2003	(Kazakhstan) Almaty	1	Kazakhstan
2004 Women's Olympic Water Polo Qualifying Tournament	23–29 February 2004	(Italy) Imperia	4	Canada
2004 Women's Olympic Water Polo Qualifying Tournament	23–29 February 2004	(Italy) Imperia	4	Hungary
2004 Women's Olympic Water Polo Qualifying Tournament	23–29 February 2004	(Italy) Imperia	4	Italy
2004 Women's Olympic Water Polo Qualifying Tournament	23–29 February 2004	(Italy) Imperia	4	Russia
Oceanian Qualification Tournament	—N/a	—N/a	1	Australia

== Preliminary round ==
All times are EEST (UTC+3)

=== Group A ===
Pos	Team	Pld	W	D	L	GF	GA	GD	Pts	Qualification
1	Australia	3	2	1	0	22	16	+6	5	Qualified for the Semifinals
2	Italy	3	2	0	1	20	14	+6	4	Qualified for the Quarterfinals
3	Greece	3	1	1	1	17	20	−3	3	Qualified for the Quarterfinals
4	Kazakhstan	3	0	0	3	16	25	−9	0	

16 August 2004; 10:45	Report	Australia	6–5	Italy	Athens Olympic Aquatic Centre; Referees: Peter Bookelman (NED); Sergio Borrell (ESP)
16 August 2004; 10:45	Report	Score by quarters: 3–1, 1–2, 1–1, 1–1			Athens Olympic Aquatic Centre; Referees: Peter Bookelman (NED); Sergio Borrell (ESP)
16 August 2004; 10:45	Report	Gynther 2 Heuchan 2 Norwood 1 Rippon 1	Goals	Allucci 1 di Mario 1 Miceli 1 Musumeci 1 Zanchi 1	Athens Olympic Aquatic Centre; Referees: Peter Bookelman (NED); Sergio Borrell (ESP)

16 August 2004; 17:45	Report	Greece	8–6	Kazakhstan	Athens Olympic Aquatic Centre; Referees: Radu Matache (ROU); Daniel Legare (CAN)
16 August 2004; 17:45	Report	Score by quarters: 2–2, 2–1, 2–2, 2–1			Athens Olympic Aquatic Centre; Referees: Radu Matache (ROU); Daniel Legare (CAN)
16 August 2004; 17:45	Report	Roumpesi 2 Karagianni 1 Kozompoli 1 Liosi 1 Moraiti 1 Evangelia Moraitidou 1 Oikonomopoulou 1	Goals	Gritsenko 2 Jakayeva 2 Koroleva 1 Tolkunova 1	Athens Olympic Aquatic Centre; Referees: Radu Matache (ROU); Daniel Legare (CAN)

18 August 2004; 09:30	Report	Australia	9–4	Kazakhstan	Athens Olympic Aquatic Centre; Referees: Boris Margeta (SLO); Hector Valcarce (ARG)
18 August 2004; 09:30	Report	Score by quarters: 3–2, 2–1, 2–0, 2–1			Athens Olympic Aquatic Centre; Referees: Boris Margeta (SLO); Hector Valcarce (ARG)
18 August 2004; 09:30	Report	Heuchan 3 Norwood 3 Castle 1 Gynther 1 Rippon 1	Goals	Ignatyeva 1 Jakayeva 1 Tolkunova 1 Zubkova 1	Athens Olympic Aquatic Centre; Referees: Boris Margeta (SLO); Hector Valcarce (ARG)

18 August 2004; 17:45	Report	Greece	2–7	Italy	Athens Olympic Aquatic Centre; Referees: Sergio Borrell (ESP); Radosław Koryzna (POL)
18 August 2004; 17:45	Report	Score by quarters: 0–3, 2–2, 0–1, 0–1			Athens Olympic Aquatic Centre; Referees: Sergio Borrell (ESP); Radosław Koryzna (POL)
18 August 2004; 17:45	Report	Liosi 1 Moraitidou 1	Goals	di Mario 3 Miceli 3 Musumeci 1	Athens Olympic Aquatic Centre; Referees: Sergio Borrell (ESP); Radosław Koryzna (POL)

20 August 2004; 09:00	Report	Italy	8–6	Kazakhstan	Athens Olympic Aquatic Centre; Referees: Mario Brguljan (SCG); Yesenia Marrero (USA)
20 August 2004; 09:00	Report	Score by quarters: 2–0, 3–1, 1–4, 2–1			Athens Olympic Aquatic Centre; Referees: Mario Brguljan (SCG); Yesenia Marrero (USA)
20 August 2004; 09:00	Report	di Mario 4 Araujo 1 Miceli 1 Tóth 1 Zanchi 1	Goals	Koroleva 3 Gubina 2 Mikhailova 1	Athens Olympic Aquatic Centre; Referees: Mario Brguljan (SCG); Yesenia Marrero (USA)

20 August 2004; 18:00	Report	Australia	7–7	Greece	Athens Olympic Aquatic Centre; Referees: Aaron Chaney (USA); Gábor Kiszelly (HUN)
20 August 2004; 18:00	Report	Score by quarters: 1–2, 3–5, 2–0, 1–0			Athens Olympic Aquatic Centre; Referees: Aaron Chaney (USA); Gábor Kiszelly (HUN)
20 August 2004; 18:00	Report	Castle 3 Gynther 3 Heuchan 1	Goals	Asilian 2 Lara 2 Karagianni 1 Moraiti 1 Moraitidou 1	Athens Olympic Aquatic Centre; Referees: Aaron Chaney (USA); Gábor Kiszelly (HUN)

=== Group B ===
Pos	Team	Pld	W	D	L	GF	GA	GD	Pts	Qualification
1	United States	3	2	0	1	20	16	+4	4	Qualified for the Semifinals
2	Russia	3	2	0	1	21	22	−1	4	Qualified for the Quarterfinals
3	Hungary	3	1	0	2	19	20	−1	2	Qualified for the Quarterfinals
4	Canada	3	1	0	2	16	18	−2	2	

16 August 2004; 09:30	Report	United States	7–6	Hungary	Athens Olympic Aquatic Centre; Referees: Nikolaos Stavropoulos (GRE); Mario Brguljan (SCG)
16 August 2004; 09:30	Report	Score by quarters: 4–1, 0–2, 1–2, 2–1			Athens Olympic Aquatic Centre; Referees: Nikolaos Stavropoulos (GRE); Mario Brguljan (SCG)
16 August 2004; 09:30	Report	Villa 4 Rulon 2 Golda 1	Goals	Dravucz 1 Pelle 1 Primász 1 Stieber 1 Tiba 1 Zantleitner 1	Athens Olympic Aquatic Centre; Referees: Nikolaos Stavropoulos (GRE); Mario Brguljan (SCG)

16 August 2004; 16:30	Report	Russia	8–6	Canada	Athens Olympic Aquatic Centre; Referees: Erhan Tulga (TUR); Torsten Bock (GER)
16 August 2004; 16:30	Report	Score by quarters: 1–2, 3–0, 2–3, 2–1			Athens Olympic Aquatic Centre; Referees: Erhan Tulga (TUR); Torsten Bock (GER)
16 August 2004; 16:30	Report	Konukh 3 Yaina 2 Salimova 1 Smurova 1 Turova 1	Goals	Gardiner 2 Arpin 1 Bégin 1 Dow 1 Robinson 1	Athens Olympic Aquatic Centre; Referees: Erhan Tulga (TUR); Torsten Bock (GER)

18 August 2004; 10:45	Report	United States	5–6	Canada	Athens Olympic Aquatic Centre; Referees: Nikolaos Stavropoulos (GRE); Noel Harrod (AUS)
18 August 2004; 10:45	Report	Score by quarters: 0–0, 1–0, 3–1, 1–5			Athens Olympic Aquatic Centre; Referees: Nikolaos Stavropoulos (GRE); Noel Harrod (AUS)
18 August 2004; 10:45	Report	Beauregard 1 Dingeldein 1 Lorenz 1 Moody 1 Rulon 1	Goals	Bégin 3 Dow 2 Campbell 1	Athens Olympic Aquatic Centre; Referees: Nikolaos Stavropoulos (GRE); Noel Harrod (AUS)

18 August 2004; 16:30	Report	Russia	9–8	Hungary	Athens Olympic Aquatic Centre; Referees: Peter Bookelman (NED); Torsten Bock (GER)
18 August 2004; 16:30	Report	Score by quarters: 2–1, 3–3, 2–3, 2–1			Athens Olympic Aquatic Centre; Referees: Peter Bookelman (NED); Torsten Bock (GER)
18 August 2004; 16:30	Report	Konukh 3 Salimova 3 Turova 3	Goals	Kisteleki 2 Primász 2 Stieber 2 Dravucz 1 Pelle 1	Athens Olympic Aquatic Centre; Referees: Peter Bookelman (NED); Torsten Bock (GER)

20 August 2004; 10:15	Report	United States	8–4	Russia	Athens Olympic Aquatic Centre; Referees: Sergio Borrell (ESP]); Boris Margeta (SLO)
20 August 2004; 10:15	Report	Score by quarters: 1–1, 4–1, 2–1, 1–1			Athens Olympic Aquatic Centre; Referees: Sergio Borrell (ESP]); Boris Margeta (SLO)
20 August 2004; 10:15	Report	Beauregard 2 Villa 2 Dingeldein 1 Lorenz 1 Stachowski 1 Rulon 1	Goals	Salimova 1 Shepelina 1 Turova 1 Yaina 1	Athens Olympic Aquatic Centre; Referees: Sergio Borrell (ESP]); Boris Margeta (SLO)

20 August 2004; 16:45	Report	Hungary	5–4	Canada	Athens Olympic Aquatic Centre; Referees: R adu Matache (ROU); Roberto Pentronilli (ITA)
20 August 2004; 16:45	Report	Score by quarters: 1–2, 2–0, 2–1, 0–1			Athens Olympic Aquatic Centre; Referees: R adu Matache (ROU); Roberto Pentronilli (ITA)
20 August 2004; 16:45	Report	Stieber 2 Kisteleki 1 Primász 1 Valkay 1	Goals	Bégin 1 Dionne 1 Gardiner 1 Salat 1	Athens Olympic Aquatic Centre; Referees: R adu Matache (ROU); Roberto Pentronilli (ITA)

== Final round ==
Bracket

Quarterfinals
B2	Russia	4
A3	Greece	7
A2	Italy	8
B3	Hungary	5

Semifinals
A1	Australia	2
A3	Greece	6
B1	United States	5
A2	Italy	6

Gold medal match
2nd place, silver medalist(s)	Greece	9
1st place, gold medalist(s)	Italy	10
Bronze medal match
4	Australia	5
3rd place, bronze medalist(s)	United States	6

=== 7th place match ===
All times are EEST (UTC+3)

22 August 2004; 10:45	Report	Kazakhstan	4–10	Canada	Athens Olympic Aquatic Centre; Referees: Radosław Koryzna (POL); Elizabeth Burman (NZL)
22 August 2004; 10:45	Report	Score by quarters: 0–2, 1–4, 3–3, 0–1			Athens Olympic Aquatic Centre; Referees: Radosław Koryzna (POL); Elizabeth Burman (NZL)
22 August 2004; 10:45	Report	Koroleva 4	Goals	Arpin 2 Bégin 2 Campbell 2 Gardiner 2 Dow 1 Illing 1	Athens Olympic Aquatic Centre; Referees: Radosław Koryzna (POL); Elizabeth Burman (NZL)

=== Quarterfinals ===
All times are EEST (UTC+3)

22 August 2004; 17:00	Report	Greece	7–4	Russia	Athens Olympic Aquatic Centre; Referees: Zoran Tomić (CRO); Mario Brguljan (SCG)
22 August 2004; 17:00	Report	Score by quarters: 2–1, 3–0, 2–1, 0–2			Athens Olympic Aquatic Centre; Referees: Zoran Tomić (CRO); Mario Brguljan (SCG)
22 August 2004; 17:00	Report	Liosi 2 Roumpesi 2 Asilian 1 Karagianni 1 Oikonomopoulou 1	Goals	Konukh 1 Salimova 1 Smurova 1 Yaina 1	Athens Olympic Aquatic Centre; Referees: Zoran Tomić (CRO); Mario Brguljan (SCG)

22 August 2004; 18:15	Report	Italy	8–5	Hungary	Athens Olympic Aquatic Centre; Referees: Sergio Borrell (ESP); Boris Margeta (SLO)
22 August 2004; 18:15	Report	Score by quarters: 2–1, 2–2, 2–2, 2–0			Athens Olympic Aquatic Centre; Referees: Sergio Borrell (ESP); Boris Margeta (SLO)
22 August 2004; 18:15	Report	di Mario 3 Bosurgi 1 Grego 1 Malato 1 Miceli 1 Ragusa 1	Goals	Dravucz 2 Stieber 2 Pelle 1	Athens Olympic Aquatic Centre; Referees: Sergio Borrell (ESP); Boris Margeta (SLO)

=== 5th place match ===
All times are EEST (UTC+3)

24 August 2004; 10:45	Report	Russia	12–11 (OT)	Hungary	Athens Olympic Aquatic Centre; Referees: Daniel Legare (CAN); Noel Harrod (AUS)
24 August 2004; 10:45	Report	Score by quarters: 3–5, 1–2, 4–0, 2–3 OT: 1–0, 1–1			Athens Olympic Aquatic Centre; Referees: Daniel Legare (CAN); Noel Harrod (AUS)
24 August 2004; 10:45	Report	Salimova 4 Konukh 2 Yaina 2 Bogdanova 1 Smurova 1 Turova 1 Vasilieva 1	Goals	Dravucz 3 Stieber 3 Kisteleki 2 Györe 1 Pelle 1 Szremkó 1	Athens Olympic Aquatic Centre; Referees: Daniel Legare (CAN); Noel Harrod (AUS)

=== Semifinals ===
All times are EEST (UTC+3)

24 August 2004; 18:15	Report	Australia	2–6	Greece	Athens Olympic Aquatic Centre; Referees: Pneter Bookelman (NED); Torsten Bock (GER)
24 August 2004; 18:15	Report	Score by quarters: 1–4, 0–1, 1–1, 0–0			Athens Olympic Aquatic Centre; Referees: Pneter Bookelman (NED); Torsten Bock (GER)
24 August 2004; 18:15	Report	Fox 1 Stuhmcke 1	Goals	Roumpesi 2 Karagianni 1 Kozompoli 1 Moraitidou 1 Oikonomopoulou 1	Athens Olympic Aquatic Centre; Referees: Pneter Bookelman (NED); Torsten Bock (GER)

24 August 2004; 17:00	Report	United States	5–6	Italy	Athens Olympic Aquatic Centre; Referees: Gábor Kiszelly (HUN); Zoran Tomić (CRO)
24 August 2004; 17:00	Report	Score by quarters: 2–1, 1–1, 1–0, 1–4			Athens Olympic Aquatic Centre; Referees: Gábor Kiszelly (HUN); Zoran Tomić (CRO)
24 August 2004; 17:00	Report	Dingeldein 1 Estes 1 Munro 1 Petri 1 Villa 1	Goals	di Mario 2 Araujo 1 Malato 1 Ragusa 1 Zanchi 1	Athens Olympic Aquatic Centre; Referees: Gábor Kiszelly (HUN); Zoran Tomić (CRO)

=== Bronze medal match ===
All times are EEST (UTC+3)

26 August 2004; 17:00	Report	Australia	5–6	United States	Athens Olympic Aquatic Centre; Referees: Peter Bookelman (NED); Torsten Bock (GER)
26 August 2004; 17:00	Report	Score by quarters: 0–0, 0–4, 3–1, 2–1			Athens Olympic Aquatic Centre; Referees: Peter Bookelman (NED); Torsten Bock (GER)
26 August 2004; 17:00	Report	Brooks 2 Fox 1 Gynther 1 Norwood 1	Goals	Estes 3 Beauregard 1 Golda 1 Stachowski 1	Athens Olympic Aquatic Centre; Referees: Peter Bookelman (NED); Torsten Bock (GER)

=== Gold medal match ===
All times are EEST (UTC+3)

26 August 2004; 18:15	Report	Greece	9–10 (OT)	Italy	Athens Olympic Aquatic Centre; Referees: Boris Margeta (SLO); Gábor Kiszelly (HUN)
26 August 2004; 18:15	Report	Score by quarters: 3–2, 3–3, 0–1, 1–1 OT: 2–2, 0–1			Athens Olympic Aquatic Centre; Referees: Boris Margeta (SLO); Gábor Kiszelly (HUN)
26 August 2004; 18:15	Report	Liosi 5 Moraitidou 3 Oikonomopoulou 1	Goals	Grego 3 Miceli 3 Bosurgi 1 Malato 1 di Mario 1 Zanchi 1	Athens Olympic Aquatic Centre; Referees: Boris Margeta (SLO); Gábor Kiszelly (HUN)

== Ranking and statistics ==
=== Final ranking ===
Rank	Team
1st place, gold medalist(s)	Italy
2nd place, silver medalist(s)	Greece
3rd place, bronze medalist(s)	United States
4	Australia
5	Russia
6	Hungary
7	Canada
8	Kazakhstan

2004 Women's Olympic champions

Italy
First title

=== Top goalscorers ===
Rank	Name	Goals	Shots	%
1	(Italy) Tania Di Mario	14	27	52
2	(Russia) Ekaterina Salimova	10	19	53
2	(Hungary) Mercedes Stieber	10	22	45
4	(Russia) Sofia Konukh	9	25	36
4	(Italy) Martina Miceli	9	25	36
4	(Greece) Kyriaki Liosi	9	27	33

== Medallist ==
Gold	Silver	Bronze
Italy Francesca Conti; Martina Miceli; Carmela Allucci; Silvia Bosurgi; Elena Gigli; Manuela Zanchi; Tania Di Mario; Cinzia Ragusa; Giusi Malato; Alexandra Araujo; Maddalena Musumeci; Melania Grego; Noémi Tóth Head Coach: Pierluigi Formiconi	Greece Georgia Ellinaki; Dimitra Asilian; Antiopi Melidoni; Angeliki Karapataki; Kyriaki Liosi; Stavroula Kozompoli; Aikaterini Oikonomopoulou; Antigoni Roumpesi; Evangelia Moraitidou; Eftychia Karagianni; Georgia Lara; Antonia Moraiti; Anthoula Mylonaki Head Coach: Kyriakos Iosifidis	United States Jacqueline Frank; Heather Petri; Ericka Lorenz; Brenda Villa; Ellen Estes; Natalie Golda; Margaret Dingeldein; Kelly Rulon; Heather Moody; Robin Beauregard; Amber Stachowski; Nicolle Payne; Thalia Munro Head Coach: Guy Baker

== Awards ==
The women's all-star team was announced on 29 August 2004.

Most Valuable Player

- (Italy) Tania Di Mario (14 goals, 7 sprints won)

Media All-Star Team

- Goalkeeper
  - (Greece) Georgia Ellinaki (40 saves)
- Field players
  - (Italy) Tania Di Mario (14 goals, 7 sprints won)
  - (Hungary) Rita Drávucz (7 goals, 6 sprints won)
  - (Greece) Kyriaki Liosi (9 goals, 21 sprints won)
  - (Italy) Martina Miceli (9 goals)
  - (Greece) Evangelia Moraitidou (7 goals)
  - (United States) Brenda Villa (7 goals)

== Sources ==
- PDF documents in the LA84 Foundation Digital Library:
  - Official Results Book – 2004 Olympic Games – Water Polo (download, archive)
- Water polo on the Olympedia website
  - Water polo at the 2004 Summer Olympics (women's tournament)
- Water polo on the Sports Reference website
  - Water polo at the 2004 Summer Games (women's tournament) (archived)
