= 2012 Women's European Water Polo Championship =

Tournament details
- Host country: Netherlands
- Venue: 1 (in 1 host city)
- Dates: 18–28 January
- Teams: 8 (from 1 confederation)

Final positions
- Champions: Italy (5th title)
- Runners-up: Greece
- Third place: Hungary
- Fourth place: Russia

Tournament statistics
- Matches played: 20
- Goals scored: 459 (22.95 per match)
- Top scorers: (Hungary) Rita Keszthelyi (19 goals)

Awards
- Best player: (Italy) Tania Di Mario

The 2012 Women's European Water Polo Championship took place at the Pieter van den Hoogenband Swim Stadium in Eindhoven, the Netherlands, from January 18 to 28, 2012.

Italy won their fifth title by defeating Greece 13-10 in the final. Hungary captured the bronze medal after a 9-8 win over Russia.

== Road to the 2012 Olympics ==
The championships was part of the qualification procedure for the 2012 London Olympics that will take place in late July and early August of that year. There will be 8 women's teams in the Olympic competition.

By the time that these championships took place, three women's places have already been booked: the winner of the Pan American Games in Guadalajara (Mexico), the Australian team for Oceania (not contested) and the British team, as host nation.

As Great Britain women's team has been entered into the Olympic competition, there was not a direct entry to the Olympic tournament from the European Championships. Six women's teams will be entered into a world-wide qualifying competition from 1–8 April 2012 for men in Edmonton, Canada and from 15–22 April for women in Trieste (Italy). Four teams from this competition qualified for the Olympic tournament.

== Draw ==
The draw was held on November 12, 2011.

=== Groups ===
Group A	Group B
Netherlands; Great Britain; Hungary; Russia	Greece; Spain; Germany; Italy

== Preliminary round ==
Team advances to Semifinals
Team advances to Quarterfinals

=== Group A ===
All times are CET (UTC+1).

	Team	G	W	D	L	GF	GA	Diff	Points
1.	Russia	3	3	0	0	38	29	+9	9
2.	Hungary	3	2	0	1	37	29	+8	6
3.	Netherlands	3	1	0	2	30	26	+4	3
4.	Great Britain	3	0	0	3	25	46	−21	0

18 January 2012; 16:00	Report	Great Britain	9–19	Hungary	Pieter van den Hoogenband Zwemstadion, Eindhoven; Attendance: 350; Referees: Mauss (GER), Grandin (FRA)
18 January 2012; 16:00	Report	Score by quarters: 1–4, 3–4, 3–7, 2–4			Pieter van den Hoogenband Zwemstadion, Eindhoven; Attendance: 350; Referees: Mauss (GER), Grandin (FRA)
18 January 2012; 16:00	Report	McCann, Gisbon 2	Goals	Keszthelyi 5	Pieter van den Hoogenband Zwemstadion, Eindhoven; Attendance: 350; Referees: Mauss (GER), Grandin (FRA)

18 January 2012; 19:00	Report	Netherlands	10–11	Russia	Pieter van den Hoogenband Zwemstadion, Eindhoven; Attendance: 1,500; Referees: Koryzna (POL), Peris (CRO)
18 January 2012; 19:00	Report	Score by quarters: 2–3, 5–3, 2–2, 1–3			Pieter van den Hoogenband Zwemstadion, Eindhoven; Attendance: 1,500; Referees: Koryzna (POL), Peris (CRO)
18 January 2012; 19:00	Report	van Belkum 6	Goals	Lisunova 4	Pieter van den Hoogenband Zwemstadion, Eindhoven; Attendance: 1,500; Referees: Koryzna (POL), Peris (CRO)

20 January 2012; 16:00	Report	Russia	15–10	Great Britain	Pieter van den Hoogenband Zwemstadion, Eindhoven; Attendance: 400; Referees: Mauss (GER), Alexandrescu (ROU)
20 January 2012; 16:00	Report	Score by quarters: 6–2, 3–2, 1–3, 5–3			Pieter van den Hoogenband Zwemstadion, Eindhoven; Attendance: 400; Referees: Mauss (GER), Alexandrescu (ROU)
20 January 2012; 16:00	Report	Fedotova 4	Goals	three players 2	Pieter van den Hoogenband Zwemstadion, Eindhoven; Attendance: 400; Referees: Mauss (GER), Alexandrescu (ROU)

20 January 2012; 19:00	Report	Hungary	9–8	Netherlands	Pieter van den Hoogenband Zwemstadion, Eindhoven; Attendance: 1,250; Referees: Stavridis (GRE), Gomez (ITA)
20 January 2012; 19:00	Report	Score by quarters: 4–4, 1–1, 1–3, 3–0			Pieter van den Hoogenband Zwemstadion, Eindhoven; Attendance: 1,250; Referees: Stavridis (GRE), Gomez (ITA)
20 January 2012; 19:00	Report	Szűcs, Keszthelyi 2	Goals	van Belkum 3	Pieter van den Hoogenband Zwemstadion, Eindhoven; Attendance: 1,250; Referees: Stavridis (GRE), Gomez (ITA)

22 January 2012; 16:00	Report	Netherlands	12–6	Great Britain	Pieter van den Hoogenband Zwemstadion, Eindhoven; Attendance: 1,700; Referees: Mauss (GER), Grandinf (FRA)
22 January 2012; 16:00	Report	Score by quarters: 1–2, 5–3, 4–1, 2–0			Pieter van den Hoogenband Zwemstadion, Eindhoven; Attendance: 1,700; Referees: Mauss (GER), Grandinf (FRA)
22 January 2012; 16:00	Report	van Belkum 5	Goals	McCann, Leighton 2	Pieter van den Hoogenband Zwemstadion, Eindhoven; Attendance: 1,700; Referees: Mauss (GER), Grandinf (FRA)

22 January 2012; 17:30	Report	Hungary	9–12	Russia	Pieter van den Hoogenband Zwemstadion, Eindhoven; Attendance: 1,500; Referees: Gomez (ITA), Brguljan (MNE)
22 January 2012; 17:30	Report	Score by quarters: 1–3, 5–4, 1–4, 2–1			Pieter van den Hoogenband Zwemstadion, Eindhoven; Attendance: 1,500; Referees: Gomez (ITA), Brguljan (MNE)
22 January 2012; 17:30	Report	Keszthelyi 4	Goals	Fedotova, Ivanova 3	Pieter van den Hoogenband Zwemstadion, Eindhoven; Attendance: 1,500; Referees: Gomez (ITA), Brguljan (MNE)

=== Group B ===
All times are CET (UTC+1).

	Team	G	W	D	L	GF	GA	Diff	Points
1.	Greece	3	3	0	0	30	21	+9	9
2.	Italy	3	2	0	1	42	33	+9	6
3.	Spain	3	1	0	2	39	35	+4	3
4.	Germany	3	0	0	3	30	52	−22	0

18 January 2012; 17:30	Report	Spain	22–12	Germany	Pieter van den Hoogenband Zwemstadion, Eindhoven; Attendance: 500; Referees: Dutilh (NED), Stajkovic (MKD)
18 January 2012; 17:30	Report	Score by quarters: 7–3, 3–3, 7–4, 5–2			Pieter van den Hoogenband Zwemstadion, Eindhoven; Attendance: 500; Referees: Dutilh (NED), Stajkovic (MKD)
18 January 2012; 17:30	Report	García 6	Goals	Zöllner 3	Pieter van den Hoogenband Zwemstadion, Eindhoven; Attendance: 500; Referees: Dutilh (NED), Stajkovic (MKD)

18 January 2012; 20:30	Report	Greece	10–9	Italy	Pieter van den Hoogenband Zwemstadion, Eindhoven; Attendance: 600; Referees: Fekete (HUN), Detko (GBR)
18 January 2012; 20:30	Report	Score by quarters: 2–2, 2–0, 3–3, 3–4			Pieter van den Hoogenband Zwemstadion, Eindhoven; Attendance: 600; Referees: Fekete (HUN), Detko (GBR)
18 January 2012; 20:30	Report	Antonakou 3	Goals	Abbate, Cotti 2	Pieter van den Hoogenband Zwemstadion, Eindhoven; Attendance: 600; Referees: Fekete (HUN), Detko (GBR)

20 January 2012; 17:30	Report	Germany	6–12	Greece	Pieter van den Hoogenband Zwemstadion, Eindhoven; Attendance: 800; Referees: Dutilh (NED), Koganov (AZE)
20 January 2012; 17:30	Report	Score by quarters: 2–3, 1–3, 1–3, 2–3			Pieter van den Hoogenband Zwemstadion, Eindhoven; Attendance: 800; Referees: Dutilh (NED), Koganov (AZE)
20 January 2012; 17:30	Report	Zollner 2	Goals	Gerolymou 5	Pieter van den Hoogenband Zwemstadion, Eindhoven; Attendance: 800; Referees: Dutilh (NED), Koganov (AZE)

20 January 2012; 20:30	Report	Italy	15–11	Spain	Pieter van den Hoogenband Zwemstadion, Eindhoven; Attendance: 500; Referees: Peris (CRO), Brguljan (MNE)
20 January 2012; 20:30	Report	Score by quarters: 4–3, 4–1, 3–3, 4–4			Pieter van den Hoogenband Zwemstadion, Eindhoven; Attendance: 500; Referees: Peris (CRO), Brguljan (MNE)
20 January 2012; 20:30	Report	Emmolo 4	Goals	Pareja 4	Pieter van den Hoogenband Zwemstadion, Eindhoven; Attendance: 500; Referees: Peris (CRO), Brguljan (MNE)

22 January 2012; 19:00	Report	Germany	12–18	Italy	Pieter van den Hoogenband Zwemstadion, Eindhoven; Attendance: 700; Referees: Stajkovic (MKD), Alexandrescu (ROU)
22 January 2012; 19:00	Report	Score by quarters: 3–4, 3–7, 3–4, 3–3			Pieter van den Hoogenband Zwemstadion, Eindhoven; Attendance: 700; Referees: Stajkovic (MKD), Alexandrescu (ROU)
22 January 2012; 19:00	Report	Blomenkamp 5	Goals	Bianconi 4	Pieter van den Hoogenband Zwemstadion, Eindhoven; Attendance: 700; Referees: Stajkovic (MKD), Alexandrescu (ROU)

22 January 2012; 20:30	Report	Greece	8–6	Spain	Pieter van den Hoogenband Zwemstadion, Eindhoven; Referees: Vogel (HUN), Levin (ISR)
22 January 2012; 20:30	Report	Score by quarters: 3–0, 0–3, 3–1, 2–2			Pieter van den Hoogenband Zwemstadion, Eindhoven; Referees: Vogel (HUN), Levin (ISR)
22 January 2012; 20:30	Report	three players 2	Goals	Tarrago 4	Pieter van den Hoogenband Zwemstadion, Eindhoven; Referees: Vogel (HUN), Levin (ISR)

== Final round ==
Bracket

Quarterfinals
B2	Italy	17
A3	Netherlands	15
A2	Hungary	11
B3	Spain	9

Semifinals
A1	Russia	12
B2	Italy	13
B1	Greece	14
A2	Hungary	12
5th–6th place match
A3	Netherlands	10
B3	Spain	11

Gold medal match
B2	Italy	13
B1	Greece	10
Bronze medal match
A1	Russia	8
A2	Hungary	9

=== Quarterfinals ===
All times are CET (UTC+1).

24 January 2012; 19:00	Report	Hungary	11–9	Spain	Pieter van den Hoogenband Zwemstadion, Eindhoven; Attendance: 900; Referees: Spiegel (GER), Koryzna (POL)
24 January 2012; 19:00	Report	Score by quarters: 5–2, 3–1, 2–2, 1–4			Pieter van den Hoogenband Zwemstadion, Eindhoven; Attendance: 900; Referees: Spiegel (GER), Koryzna (POL)
24 January 2012; 19:00	Report	Szűcs 3	Goals	Pareja, Peña 3	Pieter van den Hoogenband Zwemstadion, Eindhoven; Attendance: 900; Referees: Spiegel (GER), Koryzna (POL)

24 January 2012; 20:30	Report	Italy	17–15 (OT, PSO)	Netherlands	Pieter van den Hoogenband Zwemstadion, Eindhoven; Attendance: 1,000; Referees: Brguljan (MNE), Golijanin (SRB)
24 January 2012; 20:30	Report	Score by quarters: 4–3, 2–2, 2–2, 3–4 OT: 2–2 PSO: 4–2			Pieter van den Hoogenband Zwemstadion, Eindhoven; Attendance: 1,000; Referees: Brguljan (MNE), Golijanin (SRB)
24 January 2012; 20:30	Report	di Mario 5	Goals	Vermeer, Klaassen 3	Pieter van den Hoogenband Zwemstadion, Eindhoven; Attendance: 1,000; Referees: Brguljan (MNE), Golijanin (SRB)

=== Semifinals ===
All times are CET (UTC+1).

26 January 2012; 18:00	Report	Hungary	12–14	Greece	Pieter van den Hoogenband Zwemstadion, Eindhoven; Attendance: 750; Referees: Peris (CRO), Levin (ISR)
26 January 2012; 18:00	Report	Score by quarters: 2–4, 4–3, 4–3, 2–4			Pieter van den Hoogenband Zwemstadion, Eindhoven; Attendance: 750; Referees: Peris (CRO), Levin (ISR)
26 January 2012; 18:00	Report	Szűcs, Bujka 3	Goals	Roumpesi 5	Pieter van den Hoogenband Zwemstadion, Eindhoven; Attendance: 750; Referees: Peris (CRO), Levin (ISR)

26 January 2012; 20:00	Report	Italy	13–12	Russia	Pieter van den Hoogenband Zwemstadion, Eindhoven; Attendance: 900; Referees: Koryzna (POL), Teixido (ESP)
26 January 2012; 20:00	Report	Score by quarters: 2–2, 4–4, 3–2, 4–4			Pieter van den Hoogenband Zwemstadion, Eindhoven; Attendance: 900; Referees: Koryzna (POL), Teixido (ESP)
26 January 2012; 20:00	Report	di Mario 5	Goals	Beliaeva 4	Pieter van den Hoogenband Zwemstadion, Eindhoven; Attendance: 900; Referees: Koryzna (POL), Teixido (ESP)

=== 7th place match ===
All times are CET (UTC+1).

24 January 2012; 17:30	Report	Great Britain	13–11 (OT)	Germany	Pieter van den Hoogenband Zwemstadion, Eindhoven; Attendance: 300; Referees: Dutilh (NED), Stajkovic (MKD)
24 January 2012; 17:30	Report	Score by quarters: 2–2, 4–4, 3–1, 1–3 OT: 3–1			Pieter van den Hoogenband Zwemstadion, Eindhoven; Attendance: 300; Referees: Dutilh (NED), Stajkovic (MKD)
24 January 2012; 17:30	Report	Snell 4	Goals	Blomenkamp, Zöllner 3	Pieter van den Hoogenband Zwemstadion, Eindhoven; Attendance: 300; Referees: Dutilh (NED), Stajkovic (MKD)

=== 5th place match ===
All times are CET (UTC+1).

26 January 2012; 16:00	Report	Spain	11–10	Netherlands	Pieter van den Hoogenband Zwemstadion, Eindhoven; Attendance: 900; Referees: Detko (GBR), Grandin (FRA)
26 January 2012; 16:00	Report	Score by quarters: 3–3, 2–3, 4–3, 2–1			Pieter van den Hoogenband Zwemstadion, Eindhoven; Attendance: 900; Referees: Detko (GBR), Grandin (FRA)
26 January 2012; 16:00	Report	López, Pareja 4	Goals	Hakhverdian 3	Pieter van den Hoogenband Zwemstadion, Eindhoven; Attendance: 900; Referees: Detko (GBR), Grandin (FRA)

=== Bronze medal match ===
All times are CET (UTC+1).

28 January 2012; 14:15	Report	Hungary	9–8	Russia	Pieter van den Hoogenband Zwemstadion, Eindhoven; Attendance: 1,500; Referees: Bianchi (ITA), Mauss (GER)
28 January 2012; 14:15	Report	Score by quarters: 6–2, 1–3, 2–2, 0–1			Pieter van den Hoogenband Zwemstadion, Eindhoven; Attendance: 1,500; Referees: Bianchi (ITA), Mauss (GER)
28 January 2012; 14:15	Report	Keszthelyi 5 Bujka 2 Szűcs, Takács 1	Goals	Lisunova 3 Prokofyeva, Konukh, Belova, Tankeeva, Beliaeva 1	Pieter van den Hoogenband Zwemstadion, Eindhoven; Attendance: 1,500; Referees: Bianchi (ITA), Mauss (GER)

=== Gold medal match ===
All times are CET (UTC+1).

28 January 2012; 16:00	Report	Greece	10–13	Italy	Pieter van den Hoogenband Zwemstadion, Eindhoven; Attendance: 1800; Referees: Brguljan (MNE), Golijanin (SRB)
28 January 2012; 16:00	Report	Score by quarters: 1–4, 1–2, 3–4, 5–3			Pieter van den Hoogenband Zwemstadion, Eindhoven; Attendance: 1800; Referees: Brguljan (MNE), Golijanin (SRB)
28 January 2012; 16:00	Report	Asimaki 3 Roumpesi, Tsoukala, Gerolymou 2 Psouni 1	Goals	Abbate, Bianconi 4 Casanova, Queirolo, Di Mario, Emmolo, Frassinetti 1	Pieter van den Hoogenband Zwemstadion, Eindhoven; Attendance: 1800; Referees: Brguljan (MNE), Golijanin (SRB)

== Final ranking ==
Rank	Team
Gold medal	Italy
Silver medal	Greece
Bronze medal	Hungary
4	Russia
5	Spain
6	Netherlands
7	Great Britain
8	Germany

2012 Women's European Water Polo champion

Italy
Fifth title

Team Roster

Elena Gigli, Simona Abbate, Elisa Casanova, Rosaria Aiello, Elisa Queirolo, Allegra Lapi, Tania Di Mario, Roberta Bianconi, Giulia Emmolo, Giulia Rambaldi, Aleksandra Cotti, Teresa Frassinetti, Giulia Gorlero. Head coach: Fabio Conti

== Awards and statistics ==
=== Top goalscorers ===
Rank	Name	Team	Goals	Shots	%
1	Rita Keszthelyi	Hungary	19	33	57.6%
2	Iefke van Belkum	Netherlands	18	36	50%
3	Roberta Bianconi	Italy	16	31	51.6%
3	Tania Di Mario	Italy	16	36	44.4%
5	Jennifer Pareja	Spain	15	28	53.6%

== Individual awards ==
- Most Valuable Player
  - Tania Di Mario (ITA)
- Top Scorer
  - Rita Keszthelyi (HUN) — 19 goals
