= Italy women's Olympic water polo team records and statistics =

This article lists various water polo records and statistics in relation to the Italy women's national water polo team at the Summer Olympics.

The Italy women's national water polo team has participated in 4 of 5 official women's water polo tournaments.

== Abbreviations ==
Apps	Appearances	Rk	Rank	Ref	Reference	Cap No.	Water polo cap number
Pos	Playing position	FP	Field player	GK	Goalkeeper	ISHOF	International Swimming Hall of Fame
L/R	Handedness	L	Left-handed	R	Right-handed	Oly debut	Olympic debut in water polo
(C)	Captain	p.	page	pp.	pages		

== Team statistics ==
=== Comprehensive results by tournament ===
Note: Results of Olympic qualification tournaments are not included. Last updated: 5 May 2021.

Legend

- 1st – Champions
- 2nd – Runners-up
- 3rd – Third place
- 4th – Fourth place
- Q – Qualified for forthcoming tournament

Women's team	2000	2004	2008	2012	2016	2020	Years
Italy		1st	6th	7th	2nd		4
Total teams	6	8	8	8	8	10	

=== Number of appearances ===
Last updated: 5 May 2021.

Women's team	Apps	Record streak	Active streak	Debut	Most recent	Best finish	Confederation
Italy	4	4	4	2004	2016	Champions	Europe – LEN

=== Best finishes ===
Last updated: 5 May 2021.

Women's team	Best finish	Apps	Confederation
Italy	Champions (2004)	4	Europe – LEN

=== Finishes in the top four ===
Last updated: 5 May 2021.

Women's team	Total	Champions	Runners-up	Third place	Fourth place	First	Last
Italy	2	1 (2004)	1 (2016)			2004	2016

=== Medal table ===
Last updated: 5 May 2021.

Women's team	Gold	Silver	Bronze	Total
Italy (ITA)	1	1	0	2

== Player statistics ==
=== Multiple appearances ===
The following table is pre-sorted by number of Olympic appearances (in descending order), year of the last Olympic appearance (in ascending order), year of the first Olympic appearance (in ascending order), date of birth (in ascending order), name of the player (in ascending order), respectively.

- Number of five-time Olympians: 0
- Number of four-time Olympians: 1
- Number of three-time Olympians: 3
- Last updated: 24 January 2021.

Abbreviation

- HUN – Hungary
- ITA – Italy

Female athletes who competed in water polo at three or more Olympics
Apps	Player	Birth	Pos	Water polo tournaments					Age of first/last	ISHOF member	Note	Ref
Apps	Player	Birth	Pos	1	2	3	4	5	Age of first/last	ISHOF member	Note	Ref
4	Tania Di Mario	1979	FP	2004	2008	2012	2016		25/37			
3	Anikó Pelle	1978	FP	2004; HUN	2008; HUN	2012; ITA			25/33			
3	Elena Gigli	1985	GK	2004	2008	2012			19/27			
3	Teresa Frassinetti	1985	FP	2008	2012	2016			22/30			

=== Multiple medalists ===
The following table is pre-sorted by total number of Olympic medals (in descending order), number of Olympic gold medals (in descending order), number of Olympic silver medals (in descending order), year of receiving the last Olympic medal (in ascending order), year of receiving the first Olympic medal (in ascending order), name of the player (in ascending order), respectively.

- Number of three-time Olympic medalists: 0
- Number of two-time Olympic medalists: 1
- Last updated: 1 May 2021.

Female athletes who won two or more Olympic medals in water polo
Rk	Player	Birth	Height	Pos	Water polo tournaments					Period (age of first/last)	Medals				Ref
Rk	Player	Birth	Height	Pos	1	2	3	4	5	Period (age of first/last)	G	S	B	T	Ref
1	Tania Di Mario	1979	1.68 m (5 ft 6 in)	FP	2004	2008	2012	2016		12 years (25/37)	1	1	0	2	

=== Top goalscorers ===
The following table is pre-sorted by number of total goals (in descending order), year of the last Olympic appearance (in ascending order), year of the first Olympic appearance (in ascending order), name of the player (in ascending order), respectively.

- Number of goalscorers (40+ goals): 1
- Number of goalscorers (30–39 goals): 0
- Number of goalscorers (20–29 goals): 0
- Last updated: 1 April 2021.

Female players with 20 or more goals at the Olympics
Rk	Player	Birth	L/R	Total goals	Water polo tournaments (goals)					Age of first/last	ISHOF member	Note	Ref
Rk	Player	Birth	L/R	Total goals	1	2	3	4	5	Age of first/last	ISHOF member	Note	Ref
1	Tania Di Mario	1979	Right	47	2004 (14)	2008 (10)	2012 (18)	2016 (5)		25/37			

- Official Results Books (PDF): 2004 (pp. 72–73), 2008 (pp. 68–69), 2012 (pp. 362–363), 2016 (pp. 212–213).

=== Goalkeepers ===
The following table is pre-sorted by edition of the Olympics (in ascending order), cap number or name of the goalkeeper (in ascending order), respectively.

Last updated: 1 April 2021.

Abbreviation

- Eff % – Save efficiency (Saves / Shots)

Year	Cap No.	Goalkeeper	Birth	Age	Saves	Shots	Eff %	ISHOF member	Note	Ref
2004 (gold)	1	Francesca Conti	1972	32	39	72	54.2%		Starting goalkeeper	
2004 (gold)	5	Elena Gigli	1985	19	0	0	—			
2008	1	Elena Gigli (2)	1985	23	40	79	50.6%		Starting goalkeeper	
2008	13	Chiara Brancati	1981	27	10	20	50.0%			
2012	1	Elena Gigli (3)	1985	27	56	105	53.3%		Starting goalkeeper	
2012	13	Giulia Gorlero	1990	21	3	6	50.0%			
2016 (silver)	1	Giulia Gorlero (2)	1990	25	65	106	61.3%		Starting goalkeeper	
2016 (silver)	13	Laura Teani	1991	25	0	2	0.0%			
Year	Cap No.	Goalkeeper	Birth	Age	Saves	Shots	Eff %	ISHOF member	Note	Ref

- Official Results Books (PDF): 2004 (pp. 72–73), 2008 (pp. 68–69), 2012 (pp. 362–363), 2016 (pp. 212–213).

=== Top sprinters ===
The following table is pre-sorted by number of total sprints won (in descending order), year of the last Olympic appearance (in ascending order), year of the first Olympic appearance (in ascending order), name of the sprinter (in ascending order), respectively.

* Number of sprinters (30+ sprints won): 0

- Number of sprinters (20–29 sprints won): 1
- Number of sprinters (10–19 sprints won): 0
- Number of sprinters (5–9 sprints won): 1
- Last updated: 15 May 2021.

Abbreviation

- Eff % – Efficiency (Sprints won / Sprints contested)
- HUN – Hungary
- ITA – Italy

Female players with 5 or more sprints won at the Olympics
Rk	Sprinter	Birth	Total sprints won	Total sprints contested	Eff %	Water polo tournaments (sprints won / contested)					Age of first/last	ISHOF member	Note	Ref
Rk	Sprinter	Birth	Total sprints won	Total sprints contested	Eff %	1	2	3	4	5	Age of first/last	ISHOF member	Note	Ref
1	Tania Di Mario	1979	23	58	39.7%	2004 (7/16)	2008 (1/10)	2012 (4/10)	2016 (11/22)		25/37			
2	Anikó Pelle	1978	6	12	50.0%	2004; HUN (6/9)	2008; HUN (0/1)	2012; ITA (0/2)			25/33			

- Official Results Books (PDF): 2004 (pp. 72–73), 2008 (pp. 68–69), 2012 (pp. 362–363), 2016 (pp. 212–213).

== Olympic champions ==
=== 2004 Summer Olympics ===
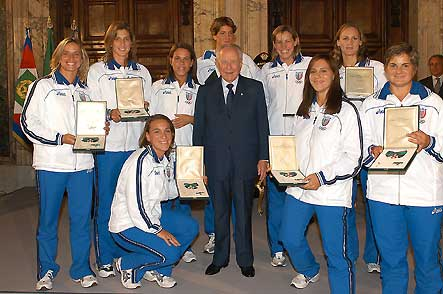
Several members of the Italy women's national water polo team with Italian President Carlo Azeglio Ciampi after winning the Olympic gold in 2004.

- Edition of women's tournament: 2nd
- Host city: Athens, Greece
- Number of participating teams: 8
- Competition format: Round-robin pools advanced teams to classification matches
- Champion: Italy (1st title; 2nd place in preliminary A group)

Match	Round	Date	Cap color	Opponent	Result	Goals for	Goals against	Goals diff.
Match 1/6	Preliminary round – Group A	16 August 2004	Blue	Australia	Lost	5	6	-1
Match 2/6	Preliminary round – Group A	18 August 2004	Blue	Greece	Won	7	2	5
Match 3/6	Preliminary round – Group A	20 August 2004	White	Kazakhstan	Won	8	6	2
Match 4/6	Quarter-finals	22 August 2004	White	Hungary	Won	8	5	3
Match 5/6	Semi-finals	24 August 2004	Blue	United States	Won	6	5	1
Match 6/6	Gold medal match	26 August 2004	Blue	Greece	Won	10	9	1
Total	Matches played: 6 • Wins: 5 • Ties: 0 • Defeats: 1 • Win %: 83.3%					44	33	11

Source: Official Results Books (PDF): 2004 (pp. 4, 10, 12, 32, 38, 42).

- Head coach: (Italy) Pierluigi Formiconi (1st title as head coach)
- Assistant coach: (Italy) Mauro Maugeri

Roster
Cap No.	Player	Pos	L/R	Height	Weight	Date of birth	Age of winning gold	Oly debut	ISHOF member
1	Francesca Conti	GK	R	1.79 m (5 ft 10 in)	71 kg (157 lb)	21 May 1972	32 years, 97 days	Yes	
2	Martina Miceli	FP	R	1.68 m (5 ft 6 in)	65 kg (143 lb)	22 October 1973	30 years, 309 days	Yes	
3	Carmela Allucci (C)	FP	R	1.67 m (5 ft 6 in)	60 kg (132 lb)	22 January 1970	34 years, 217 days	Yes	
4	Silvia Bosurgi	FP	R	1.65 m (5 ft 5 in)	61 kg (134 lb)	17 April 1979	25 years, 131 days	Yes	
5	Elena Gigli	GK	R	1.90 m (6 ft 3 in)	70 kg (154 lb)	9 July 1985	19 years, 48 days	Yes	
6	Emanuela Zanchi	FP	R	1.83 m (6 ft 0 in)	65 kg (143 lb)	17 October 1977	26 years, 314 days	Yes	
7	Tania Di Mario	FP	R	1.67 m (5 ft 6 in)	59 kg (130 lb)	4 May 1979	25 years, 114 days	Yes	
8	Cinzia Ragusa	FP	R	1.72 m (5 ft 8 in)	70 kg (154 lb)	24 May 1977	27 years, 94 days	Yes	
9	Giusi Malato	FP	R	1.70 m (5 ft 7 in)	77 kg (170 lb)	9 July 1971	33 years, 48 days	Yes	
10	Alexandra Araújo	FP	R	1.67 m (5 ft 6 in)	67 kg (148 lb)	13 July 1972	32 years, 44 days	Yes	
11	Maddalena Musumeci	FP	R	1.70 m (5 ft 7 in)	63 kg (139 lb)	26 March 1976	28 years, 153 days	Yes	
12	Melania Grego	FP	R	1.71 m (5 ft 7 in)	72 kg (159 lb)	19 June 1973	31 years, 68 days	Yes	
13	Noémi Tóth	FP	R	1.80 m (5 ft 11 in)	67 kg (148 lb)	7 June 1976	28 years, 80 days	Yes	
Average				1.73 m (5 ft 8 in)	67 kg (148 lb)	30 October 1975	28 years, 301 days		
Coach	Pierluigi Formiconi								

Sources:

- Official Results Books (PDF): 2004 (p. 73);
- ISHOF.

Abbreviation

- MP – Matches played
- Min – Minutes
- G – Goals
- Sh – Shots
- AS – Assists
- TF – Turnover fouls
- ST – Steals
- BL – Blocked shots
- SP – Sprints
- 20S – 20 seconds exclusion
- Pen – Penalty
- EX – Exclusion

Statistics
Cap No.	Player	Pos	MP	Minutes played		Goals/Shots			AS	TF	ST	BL	Sprints			Personal fouls		
Cap No.	Player	Pos	MP	Min	%	G	Sh	%	AS	TF	ST	BL	Won	SP	%	20S	Pen	EX
1	Francesca Conti	GK	6	172	98.9%					1	2							
2	Martina Miceli	FP	6	170	97.7%	9	25	36.0%	2	4	8	4				5	1	1
3	Carmela Allucci (C)	FP	6	83	47.7%	1	8	12.5%	3	1	3	1				3		
4	Silvia Bosurgi	FP	6	40	23.0%	2	7	28.6%	1	1						3		
5	Elena Gigli	GK	6	2	1.1%													
6	Emanuela Zanchi	FP	6	163	93.7%	4	10	40.0%		5	3	3	2	10	20.0%	6		
7	Tania Di Mario	FP	6	145	83.3%	14	27	51.9%	5	12			7	16	43.8%	7		1
8	Cinzia Ragusa	FP	6	82	47.1%	2	4	50.0%		3	1	3				6		
9	Giusi Malato	FP	6	119	68.4%	3	13	23.1%	1	20	3	1				4		
10	Alexandra Araújo	FP	6	55	31.6%	2	5	40.0%		7	1					3		
11	Maddalena Musumeci	FP	6	66	37.9%	2	3	66.7%		3	3					8		1
12	Melania Grego	FP	6	83	47.7%	4	14	28.6%	1	1	1					8		1
13	Noémi Tóth	FP	6	39	22.4%	1	5	20.0%		1						3		
Total			6	174	100%	44	121	36.4%	13	59	25	12	9	26	34.6%	56	1	4
Against						33	129	25.6%	5	45	42	16	17	26	65.4%	49	3	5

Cap No.	Player	Pos	Saves/Shots		
Cap No.	Player	Pos	Saves	Shots	%
1	Francesca Conti	GK	39	72	54.2%
5	Elena Gigli	GK			
Total			39	72	54.2%

Source: Official Results Books (PDF): 2004 (p. 72).

== Water polo people at the opening and closing ceremonies ==
=== Flag bearers ===
Some sportspeople were chosen to carry the national flag of their country at the opening and closing ceremonies of the Olympic Games. As of the 2016 Summer Olympics, one female water polo player was given the honour to carry the flag for Italy.

After winning gold in the women's tournament, Carmela Allucci, the captain of the Italian women's water polo team, carried the national flag of Italy at the closing ceremony of the 2004 Summer Olympics, becoming the first female water polo player to be given the honour.

Legend

- 2008 O – Opening ceremony of the 2008 Summer Olympics
- 2012 C – Closing ceremony of the 2012 Summer Olympics
- Flag bearer – Female flag bearer
- Flag bearer^{‡} – Flag bearer who won the tournament with her team

Water polo people who were flag bearers at the opening and closing ceremonies of the Olympic Games
#	Year	Country	Flag bearer	Birth	Age	Height	Team	Pos	Water polo tournaments					Period (age of first/last)	Medals				Ref
#	Year	Country	Flag bearer	Birth	Age	Height	Team	Pos	1	2	3	4	5	Period (age of first/last)	G	S	B	T	Ref
1	2004 C	Italy	Carmela Allucci^{‡}	1970	34	1.67 m (5 ft 6 in)	Italy	FP	2004					0 years (34/34)	1	0	0	1	

== See also ==
- Italy men's Olympic water polo team records and statistics
- List of women's Olympic water polo tournament records and statistics
- Lists of Olympic water polo records and statistics
- Italy at the Olympics

== Sources ==
=== Official Results Books (IOC) ===
PDF documents in the LA84 Foundation Digital Library:

- Official Results Book – 2000 Olympic Games – Water Polo (download, archive)
- Official Results Book – 2004 Olympic Games – Water Polo (download, archive)
- Official Results Book – 2008 Olympic Games – Water Polo (download, archive)

PDF documents on the FINA website:

- Official Results Book – 2012 Olympic Games – Diving, Swimming, Synchronised Swimming, Water Polo (archive) (pp. 284–507)

PDF documents in the Olympic World Library:

- Official Results Book – 2016 Olympic Games – Water Polo (archive)

PDF documents on the International Olympic Committee website:

- Official Results Book – 2020 Olympic Games – Water Polo (archive)
- Official Results Book – 2024 Olympic Games – Water Polo

=== Official Reports (FINA) ===
PDF documents on the FINA website:

- HistoFINA – Water polo medalists and statistics (as of September 2019) (archive) (p. 56)
- 1870–2020 | 150 years of Water Polo – Evolution of its rules (archive)

=== Official website (IOC) ===
Water polo on the International Olympic Committee website:

- Water polo
- Women's water polo

=== Olympedia ===
Water polo on the Olympedia website:

- Water polo
- Women's water polo
- Athlete count for water polo
- Water polo venues
- Water polo at the 2000 Summer Olympics (women's tournament)
- Water polo at the 2004 Summer Olympics (women's tournament)
- Water polo at the 2008 Summer Olympics (women's tournament)
- Water polo at the 2012 Summer Olympics (women's tournament)
- Water polo at the 2016 Summer Olympics (women's tournament)
- Water polo at the 2020 Summer Olympics (women's tournament)

=== Sports Reference ===
Water polo on the Sports Reference website:

- Country Medal Leaders & Athlete Medal Leaders (1900–2016) (archived)
- Women's water polo (2000–2016) (archived)
- Water polo at the 2000 Summer Games (women's tournament) (archived)
- Water polo at the 2004 Summer Games (women's tournament) (archived)
- Water polo at the 2008 Summer Games (women's tournament) (archived)
- Water polo at the 2012 Summer Games (women's tournament) (archived)
- Water polo at the 2016 Summer Games (women's tournament) (archived)

=== Todor66 ===
Water polo on the Todor66 website:

- Water polo at the Summer Games
- Water polo at the 2000 Summer Olympics (women's tournament, women's qualification)
- Water polo at the 2004 Summer Olympics (women's tournament, women's qualification)
- Water polo at the 2008 Summer Olympics (women's tournament, women's qualification)
- Water polo at the 2012 Summer Olympics (women's tournament, women's qualification)
- Water polo at the 2016 Summer Olympics (women's tournament, women's qualification)
- Water polo at the 2020 Summer Olympics (women's tournament, women's qualification)

=== ISHOF ===
International Swimming Hall of Fame (ISHOF) website:

- Honorees Listed by Category – Water Polo
- Honorees Listed by Category – Coaches
- Honorees Listed by Category – Contributors
- Honorees by Country
- Honorees By Last Name
