= Frances Leighton =

Frances Leighton may refer to:

- Frances Leighton (water polo) (born 1982), British water polo player
- Frances Spatz Leighton (1919–2007), American author, ghostwriter, and journalist
- Frances Margaret Leighton (1909–2006), South African botanist and educator

== See also ==
- Francis Leighton (disambiguation)
