= Water polo at the 2004 Summer Olympics =

Water polo at the Games of the XXVIII Olympiad

Tournament details
- Host country: Greece
- City: Athens
- Venue(s): Athens Olympic Aquatic Centre
- Dates: 15–29 August 2004
- Events: 2 (men's, women's)
- Teams: 12 (men's), 8 (women's) (from 5 confederations)
- Competitors: 154 men, 101 women

Final positions
- Champions: Hungary (men); Italy (women)
- Runners-up: Serbia and Montenegro (men); Greece (women)
- Third place: Russia (men); United States (women)
- Fourth place: Greece (men); Australia (women)

Tournament statistics (men, women)
- Matches: 64
- Multiple appearances: 5-time Olympian(s): 2; 4-time Olympian(s): 8
- Multiple medalists: 3-time medalist(s): 2
- MVPs: (Hungary) Gergely Kiss (men's) (Italy) Tania Di Mario (women's)

Olympic Aquatic Centre at the 2004 Summer Olympics

Water polo at the 2004 Summer Olympics took place at the Olympic Aquatic Centre where women competed for only the second time in the event at the Summer Olympics.

Twelve teams competed in the men's event, where Russia was trying to avenge their defeat by Hungary at the Sydney Olympics. There were eight teams in the women's event, where holders Australia were hoping to retain the title.

== Qualification ==
Nation	Men's	Women's	Athletes
Australia	Yes	Yes	26
Canada		Yes	13
Croatia	Yes		13
Egypt	Yes		13
Greece	Yes	Yes	26
Hungary	Yes	Yes	26
Italy	Yes	Yes	26
Kazakhstan	Yes	Yes	26
Russia	Yes	Yes	26
Serbia and Montenegro	Yes		13
Spain	Yes		13
United States	Yes	Yes	26
Total: 16 NOCs	12	8	260

=== Men`s ===
Water Polo Men	Date	Host	Vacancies	Qualified
Host nation	5 September 1997	(Switzerland) Laussane	1	Greece
2003 World League	27 June-24 August 2003	Various	1	Hungary
2003 FINA World Championships	14-26 July 2003	(Spain) Barcelona	3	Italy
2003 FINA World Championships	14-26 July 2003	(Spain) Barcelona	3	Serbia and Montenegro
2003 FINA World Championships	14-26 July 2003	(Spain) Barcelona	3	Spain
2003 Pan American Games	2-10 August 2003	(Dominican Republic) Santo Domingo	1	United States
Asian Qualification Tournament	22-24 September 2003	(Kazakhstan) Almaty	1	Kazakhstan
African Qualification Tournament	—N/a	—N/a	1	Egypt
Oceania Qualification Tournament	—N/a	—N/a	1	Australia
Olympic Qualification Tournament	25 January - 1 February	(Brazil) Rio de Janeiro	3	Croatia
Olympic Qualification Tournament	25 January - 1 February	(Brazil) Rio de Janeiro	3	Germany
Olympic Qualification Tournament	25 January - 1 February	(Brazil) Rio de Janeiro	3	Russia
TOTAL			12	

=== Women`s ===
Water Polo Women	Date	Host	Vacancies	Qualified
Host nation	5 September 1997	(Switzerland) Laussane	1	Greece
Asian Qualification Tournament	22-24 September 2003	(Kazakhstan) Almaty	1	Kazakhstan
2003 Pan American Games	2-10 August 2003	(Dominican Republic) Santo Domingo	1	United States
Oceanian Qualification Tournament	—N/a	—N/a	1	Australia
Olympic Qualification Tournament	23-29 February 2004	(Italy) Imperia	4	Hungary
Olympic Qualification Tournament	23-29 February 2004	(Italy) Imperia	4	Italy
Olympic Qualification Tournament	23-29 February 2004	(Italy) Imperia	4	Russia
Olympic Qualification Tournament	23-29 February 2004	(Italy) Imperia	4	Canada *
TOTAL			8	

- Canada took the place of the African team.

== Medalists ==
=== Men's ===
Gold	Silver	Bronze
Hungary Tibor Benedek; Péter Biros; Rajmund Fodor; István Gergely; Tamás Kásás; Gergely Kiss; Norbert Madaras; Tamás Molnár; Ádám Steinmetz; Barnabás Steinmetz; Zoltán Szécsi; Tamás Varga; Attila Vári Head coach: Dénes Kemény	Serbia and Montenegro Aleksandar Ćirić; Vladimir Gojković; Danilo Ikodinović; Viktor Jelenić; Predrag Jokić; Nikola Kuljača; Slobodan Nikić; Aleksandar Šapić; Dejan Savić; Denis Šefik; Petar Trbojević; Vanja Udovičić; Vladimir Vujasinović Head coach: Nenad Manojlović	Russia Roman Balashov; Revaz Chomakhidze; Alexander Yerishev; Aleksandr Fyodorov; Serguei Garbouzov; Dmitry Gorshkov; Nikolay Kozlov; Nikolai Maximov; Andrei Reketchinski; Dmitri Stratan; Vitaly Yurchik; Marat Zakirov; Irek Zinnurov Head coach: Alexander Kabanov

=== Women's ===
Gold	Silver	Bronze
Italy Francesca Conti; Martina Miceli; Carmela Allucci; Silvia Bosurgi; Elena Gigli; Manuela Zanchi; Tania di Mario; Cinzia Ragusa; Giusi Malato; Alexandra Araujo; Maddalena Musumeci; Melania Grego; Noémi Tóth Head coach: Pierluigi Formiconi	Greece Georgia Ellinaki; Dimitra Asilian; Antiopi Melidoni; Angeliki Karapataki; Kyriaki Liosi; Stavroula Kozompoli; Aikaterini Oikonomopoulou; Antigoni Roumpesi; Evangelia Moraitidou; Eftychia Karagianni; Georgia Lara; Antonia Moraiti; Anthoula Mylonaki Head coach: Kyriakos Iosifidis	United States Jacqueline Frank; Heather Petri; Ericka Lorenz; Brenda Villa; Ellen Estes; Natalie Golda; Margaret Dingeldein; Kelly Rulon; Heather Moody; Robin Beauregard; Amber Stachowski; Nicolle Payne; Thalia Munro Head coach: Guy Baker

== See also ==
- 2004 Men's Water Polo Olympic Qualifier

== Sources ==
- PDF documents in the LA84 Foundation Digital Library:
  - Official Results Book – 2004 Olympic Games – Water Polo (download, archive)
- Water polo on the Olympedia website
  - Water polo at the 2004 Summer Olympics (men's tournament, women's tournament)
- Water polo on the Sports Reference website
  - Water polo at the 2004 Summer Games (men's tournament, women's tournament) (archived)
