= Valkai =

Valkai is a surname. Notable people with the surname include:

- Ágnes Valkai (born 1981), Hungarian water polo player
- Erzsebet Valkai (born 1979), Hungarian and Italian water polo player
