= Water polo at the 2003 World Aquatics Championships – Women's tournament =

2003 World Water Polo Championship
- 10th FINA World Aquatics Championships
- Location: Spain
- Date: 13–25 July
- Category: 2003 World Aquatics Championships

The 2003 Women's World Water Polo Championship was the sixth edition of the women's water polo tournament at the World Aquatics Championships, organised by the world governing body in aquatics, the FINA. The tournament was held from 13 to 25 July 2003, and was incorporated into the 2003 World Aquatics Championships in Barcelona, Spain.

Hungary, United States, Canada, Russia and Italy qualified for this event by finishing in the top five at the 2002 FINA World Cup in Perth, Australia.

== Teams ==
Group A

- Australia
- Brazil
- Canada
- Great Britain

Group B

- Japan
- Netherlands
- Russia
- Venezuela

Group C

- France
- Germany
- Greece
- United States

Group D

- Hungary
- Italy
- Kazakhstan
- Spain

== Preliminary round ==
=== Group A ===
Pos	Team	Pts	Pld	W	D	L	GF	GA	GD
1	Canada	6	3	3	0	0	29	6	+23
2	Australia	4	3	2	0	1	27	9	+18
3	Brazil	2	3	1	0	2	14	18	−4
4	Great Britain	0	3	0	0	3	4	41	−37

- July 13, 2003

Great Britain	1 – 14	Canada
Australia	8 – 1	Brazil

- July 15, 2003

Brazil	2 – 9	Canada
Australia	16 – 2	Great Britain

- July 17, 2003

Great Britain	1 – 11	Brazil
Australia	3 – 6	Canada

=== Group B ===
Pos	Team	Pts	Pld	W	D	L	GF	GA	GD
1	Netherlands	5	3	2	1	0	41	15	+26
2	Russia	5	3	2	1	0	44	14	+30
3	Japan	2	3	1	0	2	19	32	−13
4	Venezuela	0	3	0	0	3	12	53	−41

- July 13, 2003

Japan	4 – 13	Russia
Netherlands	18 – 4	Venezuela

- July 15, 2003

Venezuela	4 – 23	Russia
Netherlands	15 – 3	Japan

- July 17, 2003

Venezuela	4 – 12	Japan
Netherlands	8 – 8	Russia

=== Group C ===
Pos	Team	Pts	Pld	W	D	L	GF	GA	GD
1	United States	6	3	3	0	0	35	15	+20
2	Germany	4	3	2	0	1	30	23	+7
3	Greece	2	3	1	0	2	22	21	+1
4	France	0	3	0	0	3	9	37	−28

- July 13, 2003

Germany	15 – 5	France
Greece	7 – 10	United States

- July 15, 2003

United States	15 – 3	France
Germany	10 – 8	Greece

- July 17, 2003

Germany	4 – 10	United States
Greece	7 – 1	France

=== Group D ===
Pos	Team	Pts	Pld	W	D	L	GF	GA	GD
1	Hungary	6	3	3	0	0	37	26	+11
2	Italy	4	3	2	0	1	29	24	+5
3	Spain	2	3	1	0	2	21	28	−7
4	Kazakhstan	0	3	0	0	3	19	28	−9

- July 13, 2003

Italy	11 – 6	Kazakhstan
Hungary	16 – 7	Spain

- July 15, 2003

Italy	10 – 11	Hungary
Spain	7 – 4	Kazakhstan

- July 17, 2003

Italy	8 – 7	Spain
Hungary	10 – 9	Kazakhstan

== Play-offs ==
- July 19, 2003

Australia	12 – 1	Japan
Italy	8 – 5	Greece
Russia	12 – 2	Brazil
Spain	9 – 6	Germany

== Final round ==
Quarter-finals
July 21 – Barcelona
Canada	9
Spain	8
July 21 – Barcelona
Italy	8 (5)
Netherlands	8 (3)
July 21 – Barcelona
Russia	8
Hungary	6
July 21 – Barcelona
United States	8
Australia	4

Semi-finals
July 23 – Barcelona
Canada	2
Italy	5
July 23 – Barcelona
Russia	7
United States	11

Final
July 25 – Barcelona
Italy	6
United States	8
Third place
July 25 – Barcelona
Canada	7
Russia	9

=== Quarterfinals ===
- July 21, 2003

Canada	9 – 8	Spain
Italy	8 (5) – 8 (3) [aps]	Netherlands
Russia	8 – 6	Hungary
United States	8 – 4	Australia

=== Semifinals ===
- July 19, 2003 — 13th/16th place

Great Britain	5 – 6	Venezuela
France	4 – 9	Kazakhstan

- July 21, 2003 — 9th/12th place

Greece	14 – 4	Brazil
Germany	11 – 8	Japan

- July 23, 2003 — 5th/8th place

Hungary	6 – 3	Australia
Netherlands	7 – 3	Spain

- July 23, 2003 — 1st/4th place

Canada	2 – 5	Italy
United States	11 – 7	Russia

=== Finals ===
- July 21, 2003 — 15th place

France	9 – 6	Great Britain

- July 21, 2003 — 13th place

Kazakhstan	15 – 5	Venezuela

- July 23, 2003 — 11th place

Japan	4 – 3	Brazil

- July 23, 2003 — 9th place

Greece	10 – 5	Germany

- July 25, 2003 — 7th place

Australia	7 – 3	Spain

- July 25, 2003 — 5th place

Hungary	8 – 7	Netherlands

- July 25, 2003 — Bronze Medal Match

Canada	7 – 9	Russia

- July 25, 2003 — Gold Medal Match

United States	8 – 6	Italy

== Final ranking ==
Rank	Team
	United States
	Italy
	Russia
4.	Canada
5.	Hungary
6.	Netherlands
7.	Australia
8.	Spain
9.	Greece
10.	Germany
11.	Japan
12.	Brazil
13.	Kazakhstan
14.	Venezuela
15.	France
16.	Great Britain

2003 FINA Women's World champion

United States
First title

== Medalists ==
Gold	Silver	Bronze
United States Nicolle Payne; Heather Petri; Ericka Lorenz; Brenda Villa; Ellen Estes; Natalie Golda; Margaret Dingeldein; Jacqueline Frank; Heather Moody; Robin Beauregard; Amber Stachowski; Gabrielle Domanic; Thalia Munro Head coach Guy Baker	Italy Francesca Conti; Martina Miceli; Carmela Allucci; Silvia Bosurgi; Erika Lava; Manuela Zanchi; Tania di Mario; Cinzia Ragusa; Giusi Malato; Alexandra Araujo; Maddalena Musumeci; Melania Grego; Noémi Tóth Head coach Pierluigi Formiconi	Russia Valentina Vorontsova; Natalya Shepelina; Yekaterina Salimova; Sofia Konoukh; Yelena Smurova; Galina Zlotnikova; Anastassia Zoubkova; Veronika Linkova; Tatiana Petrova; Olga Turova; Ekaterina Shishova; Svetlana Bogdanova; Maria Yaina Head coach Yury Mitianin
