= Malato =

Malato is a surname of Italian origin. People with the surname Malato include:

- Charles Malato, a French anarchist
- Giusi Malato, an Italian water polo player
- José Carlos Malato, a Portuguese television presenter
