= Ekaterina Shishova =

Russian water polo player

Personal information
- Full name: Yekaterina Vladimirovna Shishova
- Nationality: Russia
- Born: 13 September 1978 (age 48) Zlatoust, Soviet Union
- Height: 1.72 m (5 ft 8 in)
- Weight: 59 kg (130 lb)

Sport
- Sport: Water polo
- Position: centre back

Senior clubs
- Years: Team
- ?-?: Uralochka Zlatoust
National team
- Years: Team
- ?-?: Russia
Medal record
Representing Russia
World Championships
Bronze medal – third place	2003 Barcelona	Team competition

Yekaterina Vladimirovna Shishova (Екатерина Владимировна Шишова, born 13 September 1978) was a Russian-Ukrainian female water polo player. She was a member of the Russia women's national water polo team, playing as a centre back.

She was a part of the Russian team at the 2003 World Aquatics Championships, and 2004 Summer Olympics.

She was a part of the Ukrainian team at the 2007 World Aquatics Championships.

On club level she played for Uralochka Zlatoust in Russia.

== See also ==
- List of World Aquatics Championships medalists in water polo
