= Veronika Linkova =

Russian water polo player

Personal information
- Born: 24 June 1980 (age 46)
Medal record
Women's water polo
Representing Russia
World Championships
Bronze medal – third place	2003 Barcelona	Team competition
European Championships
Bronze medal – third place	2001 Budapest	Team competition

Veronika Linkova (born 24 June 1982) is a Russian water polo player. She participated at the 2003 World Aquatics Championships, and 2001 Women's European Water Polo Championship.

== See also ==
- List of World Aquatics Championships medalists in water polo
