= Water polo at the 2001 World Aquatics Championships – Women's tournament =

2001 World Water Polo Championship
- 9th FINA World Aquatics Championships
- Location: Japan
- Date(s): 18–27 July
- Category: 2001 World Aquatics Championships

The 2001 Women's World Water Polo Championship was the fifth edition of the women's water polo tournament at the World Aquatics Championships, organised by the world governing body in aquatics, the FINA. The tournament was held from 18 to 27 July 2001 in the Nishi Civic Pool, and was incorporated into the 2001 World Aquatics Championships in Fukuoka, Japan.

The draw for the water polo tournament took place on 16 April 2001 in Fukuoka. Prior to the start of the competition, Australia were ranked number one in the world.

== Teams ==
Group A

- Brazil
- Italy
- Kazakhstan
- New Zealand
- Russia
- United States

Group B

- Australia
- Canada
- Greece
- Hungary
- Japan
- Netherlands

== Preliminary round ==
=== Group A ===
	Team	Points	G	W	D	L	GF	GA	Diff
1.	United States	9	5	4	1	0	50	16	+34
2.	Russia	8	5	4	0	1	55	17	+38
3.	Italy	7	5	3	1	1	58	35	+22
4.	Kazakhstan	4	5	2	0	3	30	39	–9
5.	Brazil	2	5	1	0	4	22	51	–29
6.	New Zealand	0	5	0	0	5	16	73	–57

=== Group B ===
	Team	Points	G	W	D	L	GF	GA	Diff
1.	Hungary	10	5	5	0	0	35	19	+16
2.	Australia	6	5	3	0	2	32	22	+10
3.	Canada	6	5	3	0	2	28	23	+5
4.	Greece	6	5	3	0	2	28	27	+1
5.	Netherlands	2	5	1	0	4	21	34	–13
6.	Japan	0	5	0	0	5	19	38	–19

== Final round ==
Quarter-finals
July 25 – Fukuoka
United States	10
Greece	3
July 25 – Fukuoka
Italy	4
Australia	1
July 25 – Fukuoka
Russia	8
Canada	9
July 25 – Fukuoka
Kazakhstan	5
Hungary	12

Semi-finals
July 26 – Fukuoka
United States	6
Italy	8
July 26 – Fukuoka
Canada	3
Hungary	4

Final
July 27 – Fukuoka
Italy	7
Hungary	3
Third place
July 27 – Fukuoka
United States	5
Canada	6

== Final ranking ==
RANK	TEAM
	Italy
	Hungary
	Canada
4.	United States
5.	Australia
6.	Russia
7.	Greece
8.	Kazakhstan
9.	Netherlands
10.	Brazil
11.	Japan
12.	New Zealand

2001 FINA Women's World champion

Italy
Second title

== Medalists ==
Gold	Silver	Bronze
Italy Carmella Alluci; Alexandra Araujo; Silvia Bosurgi; Cristina Consoli; Francesca Conti; Tania Di Mario; Melania Grego; Giusi Malato; Martina Miceli; Maddalena Musumeci; Paola Sabbatini; Gabriella Sciolti; Monica Vaillant	Hungary	Canada

== Individual awards ==
- Most Valuable Player

- ???

- Best Goalkeeper

- ???

- Topscorer

- ???
