= Chiara Brancati =

Italian water polo player

Personal information
- Born: 20 July 1981 (age 45) Catania, Italy
- Height: 1.78 m (5 ft 10 in)
- Weight: 65 kg (143 lb)

Sport
- Sport: Water polo
- Position: goalkeeper

Senior clubs
- Years: Team
- ?-?: Geymonat Orizzonte
National team
- Years: Team
- ?-?: Italy

Chiara Brancati (born 20 July 1981) was an Italian water polo player. She was a member of the Italy women's national water polo team, playing as goalkeeper.

She was a part of the team at the 2008 Summer Olympics. On club level she played for Geymonat Orizzonte in Italy.

== See also ==
- Italy women's Olympic water polo team records and statistics
- List of women's Olympic water polo tournament goalkeepers
