= 2004 FINA Women's Water Polo World League =

- League: FINA Water Polo World League
- Sport: Water Polo

FINA Women's Water Polo World League seasons
- ← 2003 2005 →

The 2004 FINA Women's Water Polo World League was the initial edition of an annual tournament organized by the International Swimming Federation (FINA). The tournament was held in Long Beach, California from June 23 to June 27, 2004.

== Preliminary round ==
=== Group A ===
	Team	Points	G	W	D	L	GF	GA	Diff
1.	Russia	9	3	3	0	0	31	19	+12
2.	United States	7	3	2	0	1	24	21	+3
3.	Greece	5	3	1	0	2	26	22	+4
4.	Kazakhstan	3	3	0	0	3	12	31	–19

=== Group B ===
	Team	Points	G	W	D	L	GF	GA	Diff
1.	Italy	9	3	3	0	0	30	20	+10
2.	Hungary	7	3	2	0	1	21	17	+4
3.	Canada	4	3	1	0	2	27	36	-9
4.	Australia	3	3	0	0	3	23	28	-5

== Knockout stage ==
Semifinals
26 June 2004
Russia	7
Hungary	8
26 June 2004
United States	10
Italy	9

Final
27 June 2004
United States	6
Hungary	5
Third place game
27 June 2004
Russia	7
Italy	8

5th–8th Places

Semifinals
26 June 2004
Greece	8
Australia	7
26 June 2004
Canada	10
Kazakhstan	5

Fifth place
27 June 2004
Greece	5
Canada	6
Seventh place
27 June 2004
Australia	9
Kazakhstan	2

=== Final ranking ===
Rank	Team
Gold medal	United States
Silver medal	Hungary
Bronze medal	Italy
4	Russia
5	Canada
6	Greece
7	Australia
8	Kazakhstan

2004 FINA Women's Water Polo World League

United States
First title

== Individual awards ==
- Top Scorer
  - Stavroula Kozompoli (GRE) — 12 goals
  - Tania di Mario (ITA) — 12 goals
