= Water polo at the 1998 World Aquatics Championships – Women's tournament =

The 1998 Women's World Water Polo Championship was the fourth edition of the women's water polo tournament at the World Aquatics Championships, organized by the world governing body in aquatics, the FINA. The tournament was held from 8 to 16 January 1998 in the Challenge Stadium, and was incorporated into the 1998 World Aquatics Championships in Perth, Western Australia.

== Teams ==
Group A

- Australia
- Brazil
- Canada
- New Zealand
- Russia
- United States

Group B

- Greece
- Hungary
- Italy
- Kazakhstan
- Netherlands
- Spain

== Preliminary round ==
=== Group A ===
Pos	Team	Pts	Pld	W	D	L	GF	GA	GD
1	Canada	8	5	4	0	1	34	25	+9
2	Russia	7	5	3	1	1	49	28	+21
3	Australia	7	5	3	1	1	50	28	+22
4	United States	5	5	2	1	2	36	31	+5
5	Brazil	3	5	1	1	3	29	44	−15
6	New Zealand	0	5	0	0	5	27	69	−42

=== Group B ===
Pos	Team	Pts	Pld	W	D	L	GF	GA	GD
1	Netherlands	10	5	5	0	0	49	16	+33
2	Hungary	8	5	4	0	1	48	30	+18
3	Greece	6	5	3	0	2	32	31	+1
4	Italy	4	5	2	0	3	48	33	+15
5	Spain	2	5	1	0	4	15	35	−20
6	Kazakhstan	0	5	0	0	5	19	66	−47

== Quarter finals ==
- Wednesday January 14, 1998

Hungary	5 – 8	Australia
Canada	9 – 12	Italy
Netherlands	9 – 5	United States
Russia	8 – 6	Greece

== Semi finals ==
- Thursday January 15, 1998

Italy	10 – 9	Australia
Netherlands	7 – 5	Russia

== Finals ==
=== Placing matches ===
- Thursday January 15, 1998 — 11th place

New Zealand	9 – 7	Kazakhstan

- Thursday January 15, 1998 — 9th place

Spain	8 – 4	Brazil

- Friday January 16, 1998 — 7th place

Hungary	10 – 7	United States

- Friday January 16, 1998 — 5th place

Greece	10 – 9	Canada

=== Bronze medal match ===
- Friday January 16, 1998

Australia	8 – 5	Russia

=== Final ===
- Friday January 16, 1998

Italy	7 – 6	Netherlands

== Final ranking ==
RANK	TEAM
	Italy
	Netherlands
	Australia
4.	Russia
5.	Greece
6.	Canada
7.	Hungary
8.	United States
9.	Spain
10.	Brazil
11.	New Zealand
12.	Kazakhstan

1998 FINA Women's World champion

Italy
First title

== Medalists ==
Gold	Silver	Bronze
Italy Carmela Alluci; Alexandra Araujo; Cristina Consoli; Francesca Conti; Antonella Di Giacinto; Eleonora Gay; Melania Grego; Stefania Larucci; Giusi Malato; Martina Micelli; Maddalena Musumeci; Monica Vaillant; Milena Virzi	Netherlands Karla van der Boon; Carla van Usen; Ellen Bast; Gillian van den Berg; Daniëlle de Bruijn; Edmée Hiemstra; Karin Kuipers; Ingrid Leijendekker; Petra Meerdink; Carla Quint; Sandra Scherrenburg; Mariëlle Schothans; Marjan op den Velde	Australia

== Individual awards ==
- Most Valuable Player

- ???

- Best Goalkeeper

- ???

- Topscorer

- Karin Kuipers – Netherlands
