= Erzsébet Valkai =

Hungarian-Italian water polo player (born 1979)

Personal information
- Nationality: Hungarian; Italian
- Born: 6 March 1979 (age 47) Lajosmizse, Hungary
- Height: 1.76 m (5 ft 9 in)
- Weight: 74 kg (163 lb)

Sport
- Sport: Water polo
- Position: Centre forward

Senior clubs
- Years: Team
- ?-? ?-?: Rari Nantes Pescara; Roma
National team
- Years: Team
- ?-?: Hungary
- ?-?: Italy
Medal record
Representing Hungary
World Championships
Silver medal – second place	2003 Barcelona	Team competition

Erzsébet Valkai (born 6 March 1979) is a Hungarian and Italian water polo player. She competed for the Hungary women's national water polo team at the 2004 Summer Olympics. Later she switched her nationality to Italian. She was a member of the Italy women's national water polo team, playing as a centre forward at the 2008 Summer Olympics. On club level she played for Roma in Italy.

She is the sister of water polo player Ágnes Valkai, who was part of the Hungarian national team at the 2004 and 2008 Summer Olympics.

== See also ==
- List of World Aquatics Championships medalists in water polo
