= Francis Leighton =

Francis Leighton may refer to:

- Francis Leighton (priest) (1806–1881), English academic and priest
- Francis Leighton (British Army officer) (1696–1773), British Army general

== See also ==
- Frances Leighton (disambiguation)
