= Francesca Pavan =

Italian water polo player (born 1979)

Personal information
- Born: 1979 (age 46–47) Mestre, Italy
- Height: 1.73 m (5 ft 8 in)
- Weight: 65 kg (143 lb)

Sport
- Sport: Water polo
- Position: driver

Senior clubs
- Years: Team
- ?-?: Plebiscito Padova
National team
- Years: Team
- ?-?: Italy

Francesca Pavan (born 1979) was an Italian female water polo player. Francesca was a member of the Italy women's national water polo team, playing as driver, and she was a part of the team at the 2008 Summer Olympics.

At the club level, Francesca played for Plebiscito Padova in Italy.
