= Federica Rocco =

Italian water polo player

Personal information
- Born: 25 November 1984 (age 40)

Sport
- Sport: Water polo

Federica Rocco (born 25 November 1984) is a female water polo defender from Italy. She competed at the 2008 Summer Olympics and she is with the Padova water polo team.
