= Simona Abbate =

Italian water polo player (born 1983)

Personal information
- Nationality: Italian
- Born: 22 August 1983 (age 42) Fondi, Italy
- Height: 1.74 m (5 ft 9 in)
- Weight: 65 kg (143 lb)

Sport
- Country: Italy
- Sport: Water polo
Medal record
European Championships
Gold medal – first place	2012 Eindhoven	Team competition

Simona Abbate (born 22 August 1983) was an Italian female water polo player. She was part of the Italy women's national water polo team.

She participated at the 2012 Summer Olympics. She also competed at the 2011 World Aquatics Championships.
