= Giulia Rambaldi Guidasci =

Italian water polo player

Personal information
- Nationality: Italian
- Born: 11 November 1986 (age 39)
- Height: 1.78 m (5 ft 10 in)
- Weight: 67 kg (148 lb)

Sport
- Country: Italy
- Sport: Water polo
Medal record
European Championships
| Gold medal – first place | 2012 Eindhoven | Team competition |

Giulia Rambaldi Guidasci (born 11 November 1986 in Milan) was an Italian female former water polo player. She was part of the Italy women's national water polo team at the 2012 Summer Olympics.

She also competed at the 2011 World Aquatics Championships.
