= Elisa Casanova =

Italian water polo player

Personal information
- Nationality: Italian
- Born: 26 November 1973 (age 52) Genoa, Italy
- Height: 186 cm (6 ft 1 in)
- Weight: 105 kg (231 lb)

Sport
- Country: Italy
- Sport: Water polo
Medal record
European Championships
Gold medal – first place	2012 Eindhoven	Team competition

Elisa Casanova (born 26 November 1973) is a former Italian female water polo player.

She was part of the Italy women's national water polo team at the 2008 and 2012 Summer Olympics. She also competed at the 2011 World Aquatics Championships.
