= Fabio Conti =

Italian water polo player and coach

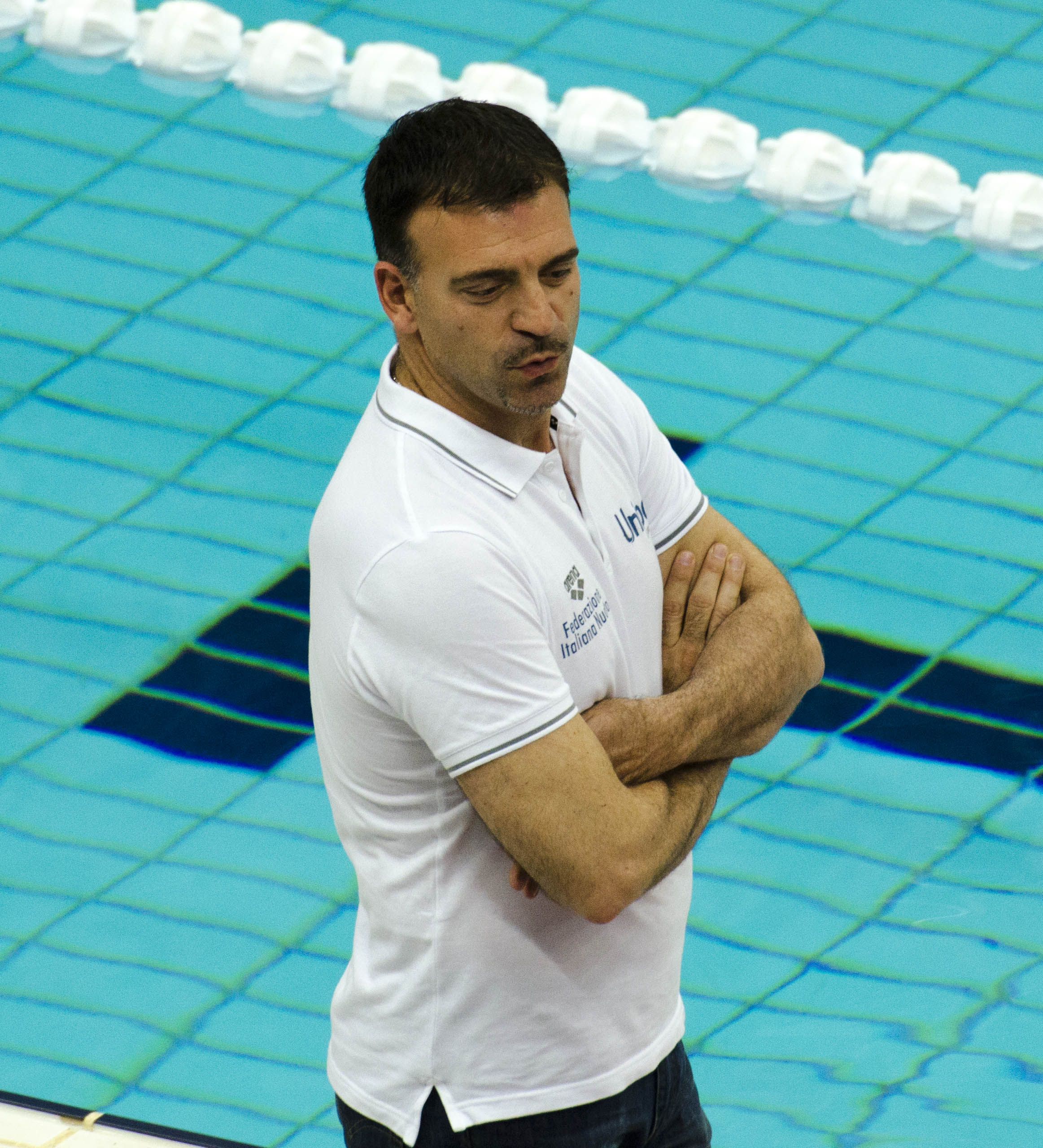

Personal information
- Born: March 22, 1972 (age 53) Rome, Italy

Sport
- Sport: Water polo

Fabio Conti (born 22 March 1972) is an Italian water polo coach. He was the head coach of the Italy women's national water polo team at the 2012 and 2016 Summer Olympics, where the team won the silver medal in 2016.
