= Mauro Maugeri =

Italian water polo coach and player (1959 - 2017)

- Born: 19 January 1959; Aci Castello, Italy
- Died: 30 November 2017 (aged 58); Catania, Italy
- Occupation: Water polo coach

Mauro Maugeri (19 January 1959 – 30 November 2017) was an Italian water polo coach and water polo player.

== Life and career ==
Born in Aci Castello, Maugeri started his career as a player as a centerback in his hometown club, and later played for Pozzillo and Poseidon.

Maugeri debuted as a coach in 1987 with Pozzillo. He got his major success coaching for 9 seasons the women's team Orizzonte Catania, with whom he won 9 national titles and 6 LEN Champions Cups. In 2001 he entered the staff of the Italy women's national water polo team, becoming head coach in 2006; with the team he won the silver medal at the 2006 Women's European Water Polo Championship, at the 2006 FINA Women's Water Polo World Cup and at the 2006 FINA Water Polo World League, and took part at the 2008 Summer Olympics, placing sixth. The same year he became head coach of the Holland women's national team with whom he won the bronze medal at the 2010 Women's European Water Polo Championship. His last assignment was as coach of the A2 men's team Muri Antichi.

Outside of his sport activities, Maugeri played a water polo coach in the 1989 Nanni Moretti's film Red Wood Pigeon.
