= Allegra Lapi =

Italian water polo player

Personal information
- Nationality: Italian
- Born: 8 September 1985 (age 40) Bagno a Ripoli
- Height: 1.65 m (5 ft 5 in)
- Weight: 54 kg (119 lb)

Sport
- Sport: Water polo
Medal record
European Championships
| Gold medal – first place | 2012 Eindhoven | Team competition |

Allegra Lapi (born 8 September 1985) is an Italian water polo player.

She was a member of the Italy women's national water polo team at the 2012 Summer Olympics. She also competed at the 2011 World Aquatics Championships.
