= 2003 World Aquatics Championships =

Aquatic sports competition

10th FINA World Championships
- Host city: Barcelona
- Date: July 12–27, 2003
- Opened by: Juan Carlos I

The 10th FINA World Aquatics Championships were held July 12–27, 2003 in Barcelona, Spain. The championships featured competition in all 5 of FINA's disciplines: Swimming, Diving, Synchronised swimming, Water Polo, and Open Water Swimming.

Competition was held in the facilities all around the city: Palau Sant Jordi, Piscines Bernat Picornell, Piscina Municipal de Montjuïc, Club de Natació de Barcelona and Port Vell.

== Schedule ==
Competition dates were:

- Diving: July 13–19 and 21;
- Synchronized Swimming: July 13–19;
- Open Water: July 13 (5K), 16 (10K) and 19 (25K);
- Water Polo:
- Swimming: July 20–27.

== Medal table ==
* Host nation (Spain)

Rank	Nation	Gold	Silver	Bronze	Total
1	United States (USA)	12	13	6	31
2	Russia (RUS)	10	5	6	21
3	Australia (AUS)	8	12	6	26
4	China (CHN)	7	4	8	19
5	Germany (GER)	5	6	5	16
6	Japan (JPN)	3	3	3	9
7	Netherlands (NED)	3	2	2	7
8	Great Britain (GBR)	2	3	3	8
9	Ukraine (UKR)	2	3	2	7
10	Italy (ITA)	2	2	1	5
11	Canada (CAN)	2	0	1	3
12	Hungary (HUN)	1	4	1	6
13	Spain (ESP)*	1	2	3	6
14	Poland (POL)	1	1	0	2
15	France (FRA)	1	0	2	3
16	Finland (FIN)	1	0	1	2
17	Belarus (BLR)	1	0	0	1
18	Czech Republic (CZE)	0	2	0	2
19	Slovakia (SVK)	0	1	1	2
20	Croatia (CRO)	0	1	0	1
20	Denmark (DEN)	0	1	0	1
22	Romania (ROU)	0	0	2	2
23	Bulgaria (BUL)	0	0	1	1
23	Mexico (MEX)	0	0	1	1
23	Serbia and Montenegro (SCG)	0	0	1	1
23	South Africa (RSA)	0	0	1	1
23	Sweden (SWE)	0	0	1	1
23	Tunisia (TUN)	0	0	1	1
Totals (28 entries)		62	65	59	186

== Results ==
=== Diving ===
Men

Event	Gold	Silver	Bronze
1 m springboard	Xiang Xu (CHN)	Wang Kenan (CHN)	Joona Puhakka (FIN)
3 m springboard	Aleksandr Dobroskok (RUS)	Peng Bo (CHN)	Dmitri Sautin (RUS)
10 m platform	Alexandre Despatie (CAN)	Mathew Helm (AUS)	Tian Liang (CHN)
3 m synchro springboard	Aleksandr Dobroskok (RUS); Dmitri Sautin (RUS)	Wang Tianling (CHN); Wang Feng (CHN)	Andreas Wels (GER); Tobias Schellenberg (GER)
10 m synchro platform	Mathew Helm (AUS); Robert Newbery (AUS)	Roman Volodkov (UKR); Anton Zakharov (UKR)	Tian Liang (CHN); Hu Jia (CHN)

Women

Event	Gold	Silver	Bronze
1 m springboard	Irina Lashko (AUS)	Conny Schmalfuss (GER)	Blythe Hartley (CAN)
3 m springboard	Guo Jingjing (CHN)	Yuliya Pakhalina (RUS)	Wu Minxia (CHN)
10 m platform	Émilie Heymans (CAN)	Lao Lishi (CHN)	Li Na (CHN)
3 m synchro springboard	Guo Jingjing (CHN); Wu Minxia (CHN)	Vera Ilyina (RUS); Yuliya Pakhalina (RUS)	Paola Espinosa (MEX); Laura Sánchez (MEX)
10 m synchro platform	Lao Lishi (CHN); Li Ting (CHN)	Loudy Tourky (AUS); Lynda Dackiw (AUS)	Evgenya Olshevskaya (RUS); Svetlana Timoshinina (RUS)

=== Open water swimming ===
Men

Event	Gold	Silver	Bronze
5 km	Evgeni Kochkarov (RUS)	Christian Hein (GER)	Vladimir Dyatchin (RUS)
10 km	Vladimir Dyatchin (RUS)	Christian Hein (GER)	David Meca (ESP)
25 km	Yuri Kudinov (RUS)	David Meca (ESP)	Petar Stoychev (BUL)

Women

Event	Gold	Silver	Bronze
5 km	Viola Valli (ITA)	Jana Pechanová (CZE)	Britta Kamrau (GER)
10 km	Viola Valli (ITA)	Angela Maurer (GER)	Edith van Dijk (NED)
25 km	Edith van Dijk (NED)	Britta Kamrau (GER)	Angela Maurer (GER)

=== Synchronised swimming ===
Event	Gold	Silver	Bronze
Solo routine	Virginie Dedieu (FRA)	Anastasia Ermakova (RUS)	Gemma Mengual (ESP)
Duet routine	Anastasia Davydova (RUS); Anastasia Ermakova (RUS)	Miya Tachibana (JPN); Miho Takeda (JPN)	Gemma Mengual (ESP); Paola Tirados (ESP)
Team routine	Russia	Japan	United States
Combination routine	Japan	United States; Spain	

=== Water polo ===
Men

Event	Gold	Silver	Bronze
Team	Hungary; Tibor Benedek; Péter Biros; Rajmund Fodor; István Gergely; Tamás Kásás; Gergely Kiss; Norbert Madaras; Tamás Molnár; Barnabás Steinmetz; Zoltán Szécsi; Tamás Varga; Zsolt Varga; Attila Vári	Italy; Alberto Angelini; Fabio Bencivenga; Fabrizio Buonocore; Alessandro Calcaterra; Roberto Calcaterra; Maurizio Felugo; Goran Fiorentini; Marco Gerini; Andrea Mangiante; Francesco Postiglione; Bogdan Rath; Carlo Silipo; Stefano Tempesti	Serbia and Montenegro; Aleksandar Ćirić; Vladimir Gojković; Danilo Ikodinović; Viktor Jelenić; Predrag Jokić; Nikola Kuljača; Slobodan Nikić; Aleksandar Šapić; Dejan Savić; Denis Šefik; Vanja Udovičić; Vladimir Vujasinović; Boris Zloković

Women

Event	Gold	Silver	Bronze
Team	United States; Nicolle Payne; Heather Petri; Ericka Lorenz; Brenda Villa; Ellen Estes; Natalie Golda; Margaret Dingeldein; Jacqueline Frank; Heather Moody; Robin Beauregard; Amber Stachowski; Gabrielle Domanic; Thalia Munro	Italy; Francesca Conti; Martina Miceli; Carmela Allucci; Silvia Bosurgi; Erika Lava; Manuela Zanchi; Tania di Mario; Cinzia Ragusa; Giusi Malato; Alexandra Araujo; Maddalena Musumeci; Melania Grego; Noémi Tóth	Russia; Valentina Voronisova; Natalya Shepelina; Yekaterina Salimova; Sofia Konoukh; Yelena Smurova; Galina Zlotnikova; Anastassia Zoubkova; Veronika Linkova; Tatiana Petrova; Olga Turova; Ekaterina Shishova; Svetlana Bogdanova; Maria Yaina

== See also ==
- List of world records in swimming
- List of World Championships records in swimming
