= Giulia Gorlero =

Italian water polo player

Personal information
- Nationality: Italian
- Born: 26 September 1990 (age 35)
- Height: 1.80 m (5 ft 11 in)
- Weight: 73 kg (161 lb)

Sport
- Country: Italy
- Sport: Water polo
Medal record
Women's water polo
Representing Italy
Olympic Games
Silver medal – second place	2016 Rio de Janeiro	Team
World Championships
Bronze medal – third place	2015 Kazan	Team
European Championships
Gold medal – first place	2012 Eindhoven
Bronze medal – third place	2016 Belgrade
Universiade
Bronze medal – third place	2013 Kazan	Team

Giulia Gorlero (born 26 September 1990 in Imperia) is an Italian water polo goalkeeper.

She was part of the Italian team that won the silver medal at the 2016 Summer Olympics and the bronze medal at the 2015 World Aquatics Championships. She was the top goalkeeper at the 2016 Olympics, with 65 saves. She also competed at the 2012 Summer Olympics.

== See also ==
- Italy women's Olympic water polo team records and statistics
- List of Olympic medalists in water polo (women)
- List of women's Olympic water polo tournament goalkeepers
- List of World Aquatics Championships medalists in water polo
