= Teresa Frassinetti =

Italian water polo player

Personal information
- Nationality: Italian
- Born: 24 December 1985 (age 40) Genoa, Italy
- Height: 1.78 m (5 ft 10 in)
- Weight: 75 kg (165 lb)

Sport
- Country: Italy
- Sport: Water polo
Medal record
Olympic Games
Silver medal – second place	2016 Rio de Janeiro	Team
World Championships
Bronze medal – third place	2015 Kazan	Team
European Championships
Gold medal – first place	2012 Eindhoven
Bronze medal – third place	2016 Belgrade

Teresa Frassinetti (born 24 December 1985) is an Italian former water polo player, who is currently deputy president of the Federazione Italiana Nuoto.

She was part of the Italian team winning the bronze medal at the 2015 World Aquatics Championships, where she played in the centre forward position. She competed in the 2012 Summer Olympics, and the 2016 Summer Olympics.

On 19 May 2017 Frassinetti announced her retirement from the game.

== See also ==
- Italy women's Olympic water polo team records and statistics
- List of Olympic medalists in water polo (women)
- List of players who have appeared in multiple women's Olympic water polo tournaments
- List of World Aquatics Championships medalists in water polo
