= Fiona McCann =

British water polo player

Personal information
- Born: 13 May 1987 (age 38)
- Height: 1.72 m (5 ft 8 in)
- Weight: 70 kg (154 lb)

Sport
- Country: United Kingdom
- Sport: Water polo

Fiona McCann (born 13 May 1987) is a British water polo player. She competed for Great Britain in the women's tournament at the 2012 Summer Olympics. This was the first ever Olympic GB women's water polo team.

She competed at the 2013 World Aquatics Championships.
