= Tania Di Mario =

Italian female water polo forward

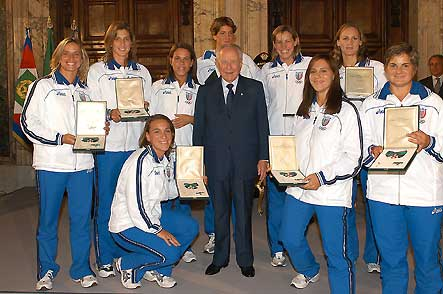
- Di Mario (3rd standing from left) with italian President Carlo Azeglio Ciampi after Olympic gold medal at Quirinale in 2004

Personal information
- Nationality: Italian
- Born: 4 May 1979 (age 47) Rome, Italy
- Height: 1.68 m (5 ft 6 in)
- Weight: 62 kg (137 lb)

Sport
- Country: Italy
- Sport: Water polo
- Club: AS Orizzonte Catania
Medal record
Olympic Games
Gold medal – first place	2004 Athens	Team
Silver medal – second place	2016 Rio de Janeiro	Team
World Championships
Gold medal – first place	2001 Fukuoka	Team
Silver medal – second place	2003 Barcelona	Team
Bronze medal – third place	2015 Kazan	Team
European Championships
Gold medal – first place	1999 Prato
Gold medal – first place	2003 Ljubljana
Gold medal – first place	2012 Eindhoven
Silver medal – second place	2001 Budapest
Silver medal – second place	2006 Belgrade
Bronze medal – third place	2016 Belgrade
World Cup
Silver medal – second place	2006 Tianjin
Bronze medal – third place	1999 Winnipeg
World League
Silver medal – second place	2006 Cosenza
Bronze medal – third place	2004 Long Beach

Tania Di Mario (born 4 May 1979) is an Italian female water polo forward, who won the gold medal with the Women's National Team at the 2004 Summer Olympics in Athens, Greece, and the silver at the 2016 Summer Olympics in Rio de Janeiro. She was also part of the Italian team at the 2008 and 2012 Summer Olympics.

Di Mario is one of four female players who competed in water polo at four Olympics. She was the top goalscorer at the 2004 Olympics, with 14 goals. She ranks second on the all-time scoring list in Olympic history, with 47 goals.

== Biography ==
Di Mario was born in Rome. She started her sport career as a swimmer, moving to water polo aged 15. After playing for Vis Nova Roma, in 1997-1998 she moved to Orizzonte Catania for which, As of 2015, she is still playing. With Catania she won a total of fifteen Italian national titles, five European Champions Cups and one European Super Cup.

She debuted with Italian national team in 1999 in the European Games held in Prato, where Italy won the gold medal. With Italy she also won the European gold medal at Ljubljana in 2003 and at Eindhoven in 2012 (MVP) and two silver medals at Budapest in 2001 and Belgrade in 2006. Di Mario took part to five world championships: in 2001 at Fukuoka, at Barcelona in 2003, Montreal in 2005 (top scorer), Melbourne in 2007, Rome in 2009, Barcelona in 2013 and Kazan in 2015 (winning a total of one gold, one silver medala and one bronze), after which she left the national team. At the 2004 Summer Olympics she was part of the team winning the gold medal. She returned playing for Italy's national team in 2012.

== See also ==
- Italy women's Olympic water polo team records and statistics
- List of Olympic champions in women's water polo
- List of Olympic medalists in water polo (women)
- List of players who have appeared in multiple women's Olympic water polo tournaments
- List of women's Olympic water polo tournament top goalscorers
- List of world champions in women's water polo
- List of World Aquatics Championships medalists in water polo
