= Kazakhstan women's national water polo team =

Kazakhstan
- FINA code: KAZ
- Association: Swimming Federation of the Republic of Kazakhstan
- Confederation: AASF (Asia)
- Head coach: Marina Pertseva
- Asst coach: Assel Jakayeva

FINA ranking (since 2008)
- Current: 14 (as of 9 August 2021)
- Highest: 9 (2012, 2014)

Olympic Games
- Appearances: 2 (first in 2000)
- Best result: 6th place (2000)

World Championship
- Appearances: 14 (first in 1994)
- Best result: 8th place (1994)

Media
- Website: aquatics.kz

The Kazakhstan women's national water polo team is the representative for Kazakhstan in international women's water polo.

== Results ==
=== Olympic Games ===
Water polo at the Summer Olympics
Year	Rank	M	W	D	L	GF	GA	GD
2000	6th	6	0	0	6	31	60	−29
2004	8th	4	0	0	4	20	35	−15
2008–2024	Did not qualify							
Total	2/6	10	0	0	10	51	95	−44

=== World Championship ===
Year	Rank	M	W	D	L	GF	GA	GD
1986–1991	Did not enter							
1994	12th	7	0	2	5	36	56	−20
1998	12th	8	0	2	6	40	89	−49
2001	8th	6	2	0	6	42	66	−16
2003	13th	5	2	0	3	43	37	+6
2005	Did not qualify							
2007	13th	5	2	0	3	39	54	−15
2009	14th	5	1	1	3	39	65	−26
2011	13th	5	2	0	3	36	66	−30
2013	11th	4	1	0	3	31	46	−15
2015	12th	6	1	0	5	35	86	−51
2017	15th	5	1	0	4	29	71	−42
2019	10th	6	1	1	4	42	84	−42
2022	11th	6	2	0	4	51	79	−28
2023	15th	5	1	0	4	29	95	−66
2024	12th	6	0	1	5	36	124	−88
Total	14/17	79	16	7	56	541	1089	−548

=== World Cup ===
FINA Women's Water Polo World Cup
Year	Rank	M	W	D	L	GF	GA	GD
1979–1991	Did not enter							
1993	8th	5	0	0	5	24	50	−26
1979–1991	Did not enter							
2002	8th	4	0	0	4	12	35	−23
2006–2018	Did not enter							
2023	R1	4	2	0	2	42	48	−6
Total	3/18	13	2	0	11	78	133	−55

=== World League ===
Year	Rank	M	W	D	L	GF	GA	GD
2004	8th	5	0	0	5	19	50	−31
2005–2009	Did not enter							
2010	R1	6	2	0	4	52	80	−28
2011–2013	Did not enter							
2014	R1	6	1	0	5	56	81	−25
2015	R1	6	2	0	4	39	64	−25
2016	Did not enter							
2017	R1	6	2	0	4	42	58	−16
2018	R1	5	0	1	4	38	57	−19
2019	R1	6	2	0	4	56	81	−25
2020	8th	6	0	0	6	45	114	−69
2022	Did not enter							
Total	8/18	46	9	1	36	347	585	−238

=== Asian Games ===
Water polo at the Asian Games
2010	2nd	3	2	0	1	57	20	+37
2014	3rd	5	3	1	1	79	28	+51
2018	2nd	5	4	0	1	70	34	+36
Total	3/3	13	9	1	3	206	82	+124

=== Asian Championship ===
Asian Water Polo Championship
2009	2nd	3	2	0	1	47	16	+31
2012	2nd	3	2	0	1	57	20	+37
2012	2nd	5	4	0	1	159	25	+134
2015	Did not enter							
2016	3rd	6	4	0	2	83	29	+54
2022	3rd	7	4	0	3	102	79	+23
2023	1st	6	6	0	0	77	42	+35
Total	6/7	30	22	0	8	525	211	+314

== Current roster ==
Roster for the 2024 World Aquatics Championships.

Head coach: Marina Pertseva

- 1 Valeriya Kolesnichenko GK
- 2 Darya Pochinok FP
- 3 Anastasiya Glukhova FP
- 4 Viktoriya Kaplun FP
- 5 Valeriya Anossova FP
- 6 Madina Rakhmanova FP
- 7 Anna Novikova FP
- 8 Yelizaveta Rudneva FP
- 9 Milena Nabiyeva FP
- 10 Viktoriya Khritankova FP
- 11 Anastassiya Mirshina FP
- 12 Anastassiya Tsoy FP
- 13 Mariya Martynenko GK
- 14 Yuliya Druzhinina FP
- 15 Olga Vorontsova FP

== See also ==
- Kazakhstan men's Olympic water polo team records and statistics
- Kazakhstan men's national water polo team
