= Emanuela Zanchi =

Italian water polo player (born 1977)

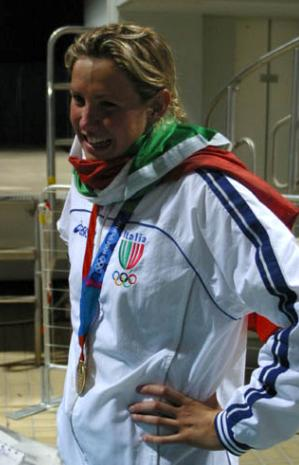

Personal information
- Born: 17 October 1977 (age 48) Milan, Italy

Sport
- Sport: Water polo
Medal record
Representing Italy
Olympic Games
Gold medal – first place	2004 Athens	Team competition
World Championships
Silver medal – second place	2003 Barcelona	Team competition
World Cup
Silver medal – second place	2006 Tianjing	Team competition

Emanuela Zanchi (born 17 October 1977) is a former female water polo forward from Italy, who won the gold medal with the Women's National Team at the 2004 Summer Olympics in Athens, Greece.

== See also ==
- Italy women's Olympic water polo team records and statistics
- List of Olympic champions in women's water polo
- List of Olympic medalists in water polo (women)
- List of World Aquatics Championships medalists in water polo
