= Cinzia Ragusa =

Italian water polo player

Personal information
- Born: 24 May 1977 (age 49) Catania, Italy

Sport
- Sport: Water polo
Medal record
Representing Italy
Olympic Games
Gold medal – first place	2004 Athens	Team competition
World Championships
Silver medal – second place	2003 Barcelona	Team competition
FINA World Cup
Silver medal – second place	2006 Tianjin	Team competition

Cinzia Ragusa (born 24 May 1977) is an Italian water polo player who competed in the 2004 Summer Olympics in Athens, Greece, where she won a gold medal.

== See also ==
- Italy women's Olympic water polo team records and statistics
- List of Olympic champions in women's water polo
- List of Olympic medalists in water polo (women)
- List of World Aquatics Championships medalists in water polo
