= Melania Grego =

Italian water polo player

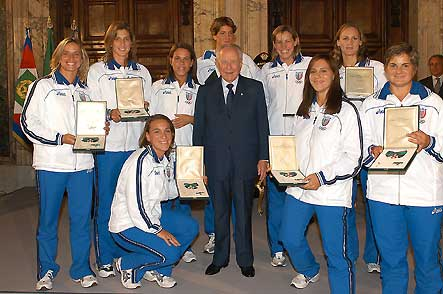
- President Ciampi with the water polo athletes, on the occasion of the meeting at the Quirinale with the Italian athletes who participated in the XXVIII Olympic Games in Athens.

Personal information
- Born: 19 June 1973 (age 53) Breno, Italy
Medal record
Women's water polo
Representing Italy
Olympic Games
Gold medal – first place	2004 Athens	Team competition
World Championships
Gold medal – first place	1998 Perth	Team competition
Gold medal – first place	2001 Fukuoka	Team competition
Silver medal – second place	2003 Barcelona	Team competition
European Championships
Gold medal – first place	1999 Prato	Team competition
FINA World Cup
Bronze medal – third place	1999 Winnipeg	Team competition

Melania Grego (born 19 June 1973) is a female water polo forward from Italy, who won the gold medal with the Women's National Team at the 2004 Summer Olympics in Athens, Greece.

== See also ==
- Italy women's Olympic water polo team records and statistics
- List of Olympic champions in women's water polo
- List of Olympic medalists in water polo (women)
- List of world champions in women's water polo
- List of World Aquatics Championships medalists in water polo
