= Noémi Tóth =

Italian water polo player

Personal information
- Born: 7 June 1976 (age 50) Szentes, Hungary
Medal record
Women's water polo
Olympic Games
Representing Italy
Gold medal – first place	2004 Athens	Team competition
World Championships
Representing Hungary
Gold medal – first place	1994 Rome	Team competition
Representing Italy
Silver medal – second place	2003 Barcelona	Team competition

Noémi Tóth (born 7 June 1976) is a female water polo defender from Italy, who won the gold medal with the Women's National Team at the 2004 Summer Olympics in Athens, Greece.

== See also ==
- Italy women's Olympic water polo team records and statistics
- List of Olympic champions in women's water polo
- List of Olympic medalists in water polo (women)
- List of world champions in women's water polo
- List of World Aquatics Championships medalists in water polo
