= Frances Leighton (water polo) =

British water polo player

Personal information
- Born: 30 March 1982 (age 43); Sheffield, Great Britain

Sport
- Sport: Water polo

Frances "Fran" Leighton (born 30 March 1982) is a British water polo player. She competed for Great Britain in the women's tournament at the 2012 Summer Olympics. This was the first ever Olympic GB women's water polo team.
