= Alexandra Araújo =

Italian water polo player

Alexandra Araujo
Personal information
- Born: 13 July 1972 (age 53) Rio de Janeiro, Brazil
Medal record
Women's water polo
Representing Italy
Olympic Games
Gold medal – first place	2004 Athens	Team competition
World Championships
Gold medal – first place	1998 Perth	Team competition
Gold medal – first place	2001 Fukuoka	Team competition
Silver medal – second place	2003 Barcelona	Team competition
European Championships
Gold medal – first place	1999 Prato	Team competition
FINA World Cup
Bronze medal – third place	1999 Winnipeg	Team competition

Alexandra Araujo (born 13 July 1972) is a Brazilian-born female water polo centre forward from Italy, who won the gold medal with the Women's National Team at the 2004 Summer Olympics in Athens, Greece.

== See also ==
- Italy women's Olympic water polo team records and statistics
- List of Olympic champions in women's water polo
- List of Olympic medalists in water polo (women)
- List of world champions in women's water polo
- List of World Aquatics Championships medalists in water polo
