= Carmela Allucci =

Italian water polo player

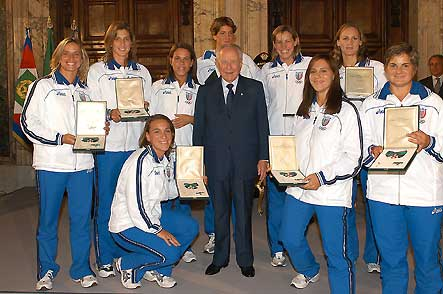
- President Ciampi with the water polo athletes, on the occasion of the meeting at the Quirinale with the Italian athletes who participated in the XXVIII Olympic Games in Athens.

Personal information
- Born: 22 January 1970 (age 56) Naples, Italy
Medal record
Women's water polo
Representing Italy
Olympic Games
Gold medal – first place	2004 Athens	Team competition
World Championships
Gold medal – first place	1998 Perth	Team competition
Gold medal – first place	2001 Fukuoka	Team competition
Silver medal – second place	2003 Barcelona	Team competition
European Championships
Gold medal – first place	1999 Prato	Team competition
FINA World Cup
Bronze medal – third place	1999 Winnipeg	Team competition

Carmela Allucci (born 22 January 1970) is a female water polo midfielder from Italy, who won the gold medal with the Women's National Team at the 2004 Summer Olympics in Athens, Greece.

Allucci was given the honour to carry the national flag of Italy at the closing ceremony of the 2004 Summer Olympics, becoming the first female water polo player to be a flag bearer at the opening and closing ceremonies of the Olympics.

== See also ==
- Italy women's Olympic water polo team records and statistics
- List of Olympic champions in women's water polo
- List of Olympic medalists in water polo (women)
- List of world champions in women's water polo
- List of World Aquatics Championships medalists in water polo
