= Giusi Malato =

Italian water polo player

Personal information
- Full name: Giusi Letizia Malato
- Born: 9 July 1971 (age 54) Catania, Italy
Medal record
Women's water polo
Representing Italy
Olympic Games
Gold medal – first place	2004 Athens	Team competition
World Championships
Gold medal – first place	1998 Perth	Team competition
Gold medal – first place	2001 Fukuoka	Team competition
Silver medal – second place	2003 Barcelona	Team competition
European Championships
Gold medal – first place	1999 Prato	Team competition

Giusi Letizia Malato (born 9 July 1971) is a female water polo centre forward from Italy, who won the gold medal with the Women's National Team at the 2004 Summer Olympics in Athens, Greece. She became topscorer of the 1999 European Championship with thirteen goals.

== See also ==
- Italy women's Olympic water polo team records and statistics
- List of Olympic champions in women's water polo
- List of Olympic medalists in water polo (women)
- List of world champions in women's water polo
- List of World Aquatics Championships medalists in water polo
