= Water polo at the 2022 World Aquatics Championships – Women's team rosters =

This article shows the roster of all participating teams at the women's water polo tournament at the 2022 World Aquatics Championships.

== Group A ==
=== Canada ===
The following is Canadian roster in the Water polo at the 2022 World Aquatics Championships – Women's tournament.

Head coach: David Paradelo

- 1 Jessica Gaudreault GK
- 2 Kelly McKee FP
- 3 Axelle Crevier D
- 4 Emma Wright CB
- 5 Amanda Amorosa FP
- 6 Gurpreet Sohi D
- 7 Verica Bakoc D
- 8 Rae Lekness CF
- 9 Hayley McKelvey CB
- 10 Kyra Christmas D
- 11 Kindred Paul D
- 12 Shae La Roche D
- 13 Clara Vulpisi GK

=== Colombia ===
The following is Colombian roster in the Water polo at the 2022 World Aquatics Championships – Women's tournament.

Head coach: Bladimir Lopez Molina

- 1 Sara Agudelo GK
- 2 Angela Rivera CF
- 3 Valentina Restrepo CF
- 4 Carolina Ortega Fuentes FP
- 5 Antonia Caicedo Granada CF
- 6 Juliana Atehortua Gil FP
- 7 Daniela Marin Correa FP
- 8 Carolina Lastre Palomeque FP
- 9 Maria Jose Serna Quiroz FP
- 10 Sara Vanegas Morales FP
- 11 Susana Atehortua Gil FP
- 12 Ana Maria Correa Vanegas FP
- 13 Isabella Chamorro Vergara GK

=== Hungary ===
The following is Hungarian roster in the Water polo at the 2022 World Aquatics Championships – Women's tournament.

Head coach: Attila Bíró

- 1 Edina Gangl GK
- 2 Dorottya Szilágyi FP
- 3 Vanda Vályi FP
- 4 Gréta Gurisatti FP
- 5 Zsuzsanna Máté FP
- 6 Rebecca Parkes CB
- 7 Géraldine Mahieu CF
- 8 Rita Keszthelyi FP
- 9 Dóra Leimeter FP
- 10 Natasa Rybanska FP
- 11 Kamilla Faragó FP
- 12 Krisztina Garda FP
- 13 Alda Magyari GK

=== Italy ===
The following is Italian roster in the Water polo at the 2022 World Aquatics Championships – Women's tournament.

Head coach: Carlo Silipo

- 1 Laura Teani GK
- 2 Chiara Tabani CB
- 3 Claudia Roberta Marletta D
- 4 Silvia Avegno D
- 5 Elisa Queirolo D
- 6 Sofia Giustini D
- 7 Domitilla Picozzi D
- 8 Roberta Bianconi D
- 9 Giulia Emmolo D
- 10 Valeria Palmieri CF
- 11 Giuditta Galardi CF
- 12 Giulia Viacava CB
- 13 Caterina Banchelli GK

== Group B ==
=== Argentina ===
The following is Argentinian roster in the Water polo at the 2022 World Aquatics Championships – Women's tournament.

Head coach: Guillermo Setti

- 1 Nahir Stegmayer GK
- 2 Lucia Ruiz Castellani FP
- 3 Cecilia Leonard FP
- 4 Ashley Hatcher FP
- 5 Ludmila Ianni FP
- 6 Julieta Auliel FP
- 7 Lara Romano Maitena FP
- 8 Carla Comba FP
- 9 Isabel Riley FP
- 10 Ana Agnesina FP
- 11 Anahí Bacigalupo FP
- 12 Dana Gerschcovsky FP
- 13 Lola Canales GK

=== Netherlands ===
The following is Dutch roster in the Water polo at the 2022 World Aquatics Championships – Women's tournament.

Head coach: Evangelos Doudesis

- 1 Laura Aarts GK
- 2 Iris Wolves CF
- 3 Brigitte Sleeking D
- 4 Sabrina van der Sloot D
- 5 Lola Moolhuijzen D
- 6 Simone van de Kraats D
- 7 Rozanne Voorvelt FP
- 8 Vivian Sevenich CF
- 9 Kitty-Lynn Joustra CF
- 10 Ilse Koolhaas CB
- 11 Maxine Schaap D
- 12 Nina ten Broek D
- 13 Sarah Buis GK

=== South Africa ===
The following is South African roster in the Water polo at the 2022 World Aquatics Championships – Women's tournament.

Head coach: Delaine Mentoor

- 1 Daniela Passoni GK
- 2 Tumi Macdonell CB
- 3 Paige Tancrel FP
- 4 Anna Thornton-Dibb FP
- 5 Iman Akomolafe FP
- 6 Hanna Muller FP
- 7 Shakira January CB
- 8 Esihle Zondo CF
- 9 Nicola Macleod FP
- 10 Ruby Versfeld CF
- 11 Ashleigh Vaughn FP
- 12 Chloe Meecham CB
- 13 Meghan Maartens GK

=== United States ===
The following is American roster in the Water polo at the 2022 World Aquatics Championships – Women's tournament.

Head coach: Adam Krikorian

- 1 Ashleigh Johnson GK
- 2 Maddie Musselman FP
- 3 Tara Prentice CF
- 4 Rachel Fattal FP
- 5 Ava Elizabeth Johnson CB
- 6 Maggie Steffens FP
- 7 Stephania Haralabidis FP
- 8 Ryann Neushul FP
- 9 Denise Mammolito FP
- 10 Kaleigh Gilchrist CF
- 11 Bayley Weber FP
- 12 Jordan Raney CB
- 13 Amanda Longan GK

== Group C ==
=== Australia ===
The following is Australian roster in the Water polo at the 2022 World Aquatics Championships – Women's tournament.

Head coach: Paul Oberman

- 1 Gabriella Palm GK
- 2 Pascalle Casey D
- 3 Tenealle Fasala CF
- 4 Bronte Halligan D
- 5 Bridget Leeson-Smith D
- 6 Abby Andrews D
- 7 Charlize Andrews D
- 8 Amy Ridge CB
- 9 Zoe Arancini D
- 10 Lena Mihailovic D
- 11 Matilda Kearns CB
- 12 Hayley Ballesty CB
- 13 Genevieve Longman GK

=== Brazil ===
The following is Brazilian roster in the Water polo at the 2022 World Aquatics Championships – Women's tournament.

Head coach: Frank Diaz

- 1 Thatiana Pregolini GK
- 2 Alissa Pinciroli D
- 3 Mariane Cosmo CF
- 4 Kemily Leão D
- 5 Jennifer Cavalcante CF
- 6 Marcela Marrani D
- 7 Samantha Ferreira D
- 8 Luana Quinn CB
- 9 Letícia Belorio D
- 10 Rebecca Moreir CB
- 11 Mirella Coutinho D
- 12 Ana Julia Amaral D
- 13 Isabela Mendes GK

=== Kazakhstan ===
The following is Kazakhstani roster in the Water polo at the 2022 World Aquatics Championships – Women's tournament.

Head coach: Marat Naurazbekov

- 1 Alexandra Zharkimbayeva GK
- 2 Darya Pochinok CB
- 3 Valeriya Anossova D
- 4 Anna Turova CB
- 5 Anastassiya Yeremina CB
- 6 Darya Roga D
- 7 Anna Novikova D
- 8 Darya Muravyeva CF
- 9 Nadezhda Shapovalova D
- 10 Viktoriya Khritankova D
- 11 Anastassiya Mirshina CF
- 12 Anastassiya Murataliyeva D
- 13 Mariya Martynenko GK

=== New Zealand ===
The following is New Zealand roster in the Water polo at the 2022 World Aquatics Championships – Women's tournament.

Head coach: (United Kingdom) Angela Winstanley-Smith

- 1 Jessica Milicich GK
- 2 Emily Nicholson CF
- 3 Bernadette Doyle FP
- 4 Elizabeth Gault FP
- 5 Gabrielle Milicich FP
- 6 Morgan McDowall CF
- 7 Emmerson Houghton CB
- 8 Katie McKenty CB
- 9 Sophie Shorter-Robinson CF
- 10 Gabriella MacDonald FP
- 11 Malia Josephson FP
- 12 Millie Quin FP
- 13 Bridget Layburn GK

== Group D ==
=== France ===
The following is French roster in the Water polo at the 2022 World Aquatics Championships – Women's tournament.

Head coach: Émilien Bugeaud

- 1 Chloé Vidal GK
- 2 Estelle Millot D
- 3 Gabrielle Fitaire CB
- 4 Camelia Bouloukbachi FP
- 5 Louise Guillet D
- 6 Kahena Benlekbir D
- 7 Juliette Dhalluin D
- 8 Aurelie Battu CF
- 9 Ema Vernoux FP
- 10 Viviane Bahia FP
- 11 Camille Radosavljevic FP
- 12 Audrey Daule D
- 13 Anne Collas GK

=== Greece ===
The following is Greek roster in the Water polo at the 2022 World Aquatics Championships – Women's tournament.

Head coach: Alexia Kammenou

- 1 Ioanna Stamatopoulou GK
- 2 Eleftheria Plevritou FP
- 3 Ioanna Chydirioti FP
- 4 Eleni Elliniadi FP
- 5 Margarita Plevritou FP
- 6 Eleni Xenaki CF
- 7 Eirini Ninou FP
- 8 Maria Patra FP
- 9 Christina Siouti FP
- 10 Vasiliki Plevritou FP
- 11 Athina Dimitra Giannopoulou FP
- 12 Maria Myriokefalitaki CF
- 13 Eleni Sotireli GK

=== Spain ===
The following is Spanish roster in the Water polo at the 2022 World Aquatics Championships – Women's tournament.

Head coach: Miki Oca

- 1 Laura Ester GK
- 2 Cristina Nogué FP
- 3 Anni Espar FP
- 4 Beatriz Ortiz FP
- 5 Nona Pérez FP
- 6 Irene González FP
- 7 Elena Ruiz FP
- 8 Pili Peña FP
- 9 Judith Forca FP
- 10 Paula Camús FP
- 11 Maica García Godoy CF
- 12 Paula Leitón CF
- 13 Martina Terré GK

=== Thailand ===
The following is Thai roster in the Water polo at the 2022 World Aquatics Championships – Women's tournament.

Head coach: (Uzbekistan) Natalya Rustamova

- 1 Napason Mouksung GK
- 2 Thanidakarn Kwantongtanaree FP
- 3 Poonnada Rotchanarut FP
- 4 Wataniya Nilklad FP
- 5 Nattamon Khamma FP
- 6 Kornkarn Puengpongsakul FP
- 7 Kritsana Puangtong FP
- 8 Benyakorn Khunprathum FP
- 9 Raksina Rueangsappaisan FP
- 10 Issaree Turon FP
- 11 Yanisa Turon FP
- 12 Panchita Rodwattanadisakul FP
- 13 Phanthila Arsayuth GK
