= Water polo at the 1991 World Aquatics Championships – Women's tournament =

1991 World Water Polo Championship
- 6th FINA World Aquatics Championships
- Location: Australia
- Date: 3–13 January
- Category: 1991 World Aquatics Championships

The 1991 Women's World Water Polo Championship was the second edition of the women's water polo tournament at the World Aquatics Championships, organised by the world governing body in aquatics, the FINA. The tournament was held from 3 to 13 January 1991, and was incorporated into the 1991 World Aquatics Championships in Perth, Western Australia.

== Teams ==
GROUP A

- Canada
- France
- Germany
- Netherlands
- New Zealand

GROUP B

- Australia
- Brazil
- Hungary
- United States

== Preliminary round ==
=== GROUP A ===
	Team	Points	G	W	D	L	GF	GA	Diff
1.	Netherlands	8	4	4	0	0	49	35	+14
2.	Canada	6	4	3	0	1	40	25	+15
3.	Germany	4	4	2	0	2	38	33	+5
4.	New Zealand	2	4	1	0	3	29	42	–13
5.	France	0	4	0	0	4	28	49	–21

=== GROUP B ===
	Team	Points	G	W	D	L	GF	GA	Diff
1.	Hungary	6	3	3	0	0	40	18	+22
2.	United States	4	3	2	0	1	30	17	+13
3.	Australia	2	3	1	0	2	27	19	+8
4.	Brazil	0	3	0	0	3	3	46	–43

== Final round ==
=== GROUP C ===
	Team	Points	G	W	D	L	GF	GA	Diff
1.	Netherlands	4	3	2	0	1	22	12	+10
2.	Canada	3	3	1	1	1	14	20	–6
3.	United States	3	3	1	1	1	17	18	–1
4.	Hungary	2	3	1	0	2	16	19	–3

== Final ranking ==
RANK	TEAM
	Netherlands
	Canada
	United States
4.	Hungary
5.	Australia
6.	Germany
7.	New Zealand
8.	Brazil
9.	France

1991 FINA Women's World champion

Netherlands
First title

== Individual awards ==
- Most Valuable Player

- ???

- Best Goalkeeper

- ???

RANK	TOPSCORERS	GOALS
1.	Birgit Kempen (GER)	23
2.	Alice Lindhout (NED)	17
3.	Hedda Verdam (NED)	16
4.	Patricia Libregts (NED)	14

== Medalists ==
Netherlands

Karla van der Boon (goal),
Hellen Boering (goal),
Irma Brander,
Edmée Hiemstra,
Monique Kranenburg,
Karin Kuipers,
Patricia Libregts,
Alice Lindhout,
Lilian Ossendrijver,
Janny Spijker,
Esmeralda van den Water,
Marjan op den Velde,
Hedda Verdam.
Head coach: Peter van den Biggelaar.

United States

Amber Drury
Sandy Vessey-Schneider
