= Water polo at the 1994 World Aquatics Championships – Women's tournament =

1994 World Water Polo Championship
- 7th FINA World Aquatics Championships
- Location: Italy
- Date: 1–11 September 1994
- Category: 1994 World Aquatics Championships

The 1994 Women's World Water Polo Championship was the third edition of the women's water polo tournament at the World Aquatics Championships, organised by the world governing body in aquatics, the FINA. The tournament was held from 1 to 11 September 1994, and was incorporated into the 1994 World Aquatics Championships in Rome, Italy.

== Teams ==
GROUP A

- Brazil
- Canada
- France
- Hungary
- Netherlands
- Russia

GROUP B

- Australia
- Germany
- Italy
- Kazakhstan
- New Zealand
- United States

== Preliminary round ==
=== GROUP A ===
	Team	Points	G	W	D	L	GF	GA	Diff
1.	Netherlands	8	5	4	0	1	58	25	+33
2.	Hungary	8	5	4	0	1	41	28	+13
3.	Canada	6	5	3	0	2	46	41	+5
4.	Russia	6	5	3	0	2	39	35	+4
5.	France	2	5	1	0	4	28	56	–28
6.	Brazil	0	5	0	0	5	29	56	–27

=== GROUP B ===
	Team	Points	G	W	D	L	GF	GA	Diff
1.	Italy	9	5	4	1	0	55	29	+26
2.	United States	9	5	4	1	0	50	29	+21
3.	Australia	6	5	3	0	2	49	34	+15
4.	Germany	3	5	1	1	3	38	47	–9
5.	New Zealand	2	5	1	0	4	22	57	–35
6.	Kazakhstan	1	5	0	1	4	24	42	–18

== Final round ==
=== Semi finals ===
Hungary	7 – 5	Italy
Netherlands	10 – 7	United States

=== Bronze medal match ===
Italy	14 – 9	United States

=== Final ===
Hungary	7 – 5	Netherlands

== Final ranking ==
RANK	TEAM
	Hungary
	Netherlands
	Italy
4.	United States
5.	Canada
6.	Australia
7.	Russia
8.	Germany
9.	Brazil
10.	New Zealand
11.	France
12.	Kazakhstan

1994 FINA Women's World champion

Hungary
First title

== Individual awards ==
- Most Valuable Player

- ???

- Best Goalkeeper

- ???

- Topscorer

- Karin Kuipers - The Netherlands

== Medalists ==
Gold	Silver	Bronze
Hungary Katalin Kisne Dancsa; Zsuzsa Dunkel; Andrea Eke; Zsuzsanna Hulf; Ildiko Kuna; Iren Rafael; Katalin Redei; Edit Sipos; Mercedes Stieber; Orsolya Szalkay; Krisztina Szremko; Gabriella Toth; Noemi Toth	Netherlands Ellen Bast; Hellen Boering; Edme Hiemstra; Stella Kriekaard; Karin Kuipers; Ingrid Leijendekker; Alice Lindhout; Sandra Scherrenburg; Rianne Schram; Janny Spijker; Gillian van den Berg; Karla van der Boon; Hedda Verdam	Italy Nicoletta Abbate; Carmela Allucci; Cristina Consoli; Francesca Conti; Antonella Di Giacinto; Melania Grego; Stefania Lariucci; Giusy Malato; Martina Miceli; Paola Sabbatini; Oriana Di Siena; Monica Vaillant; Milena Virz

== Sources ==
- Results
- World Championship, sportquick
