= Water polo at the 1991 World Aquatics Championships =

The water polo events at the 1991 World Aquatics Championships were held from 3 to 13 January 1991, in Perth, Western Australia.

== Medal summary ==
=== Medal table ===
Rank	Nation	Gold	Silver	Bronze	Total
1	Netherlands (NED)	1	0	0	1
1	Yugoslavia (YUG)	1	0	0	1
3	Canada (CAN)	0	1	0	1
3	Spain (ESP)	0	1	0	1
5	Hungary (HUN)	0	0	1	1
5	United States (USA)	0	0	1	1
Totals (6 entries)		2	2	2	6

=== Medalists ===
Event	Gold	Silver	Bronze
Men	Yugoslavia Mislav Bezmalinović; Perica Bukić; Viktor Jelenić; Igor Milanović; Vitomir Padovan; Dušan Popović; Renco Posinković; Goran Rađenović; Dubravko Šimenc; Aleksandar Šoštar; Vaso Subotić; Anto Vasović; Mirko Vičević Head coach: Nikola Stamenić	Spain Daniel Ballart; Manuel Estiarte (c); Pedro García; Salvador Gómez; Marco Antonio González; Rubén Michavila; Miki Oca; Josep Picó; Jesús Rollán; Ricardo Sánchez; Jordi Sans; Manuel Silvestre; Juan Valls Head coach: Dragan Matutinović	Hungary Tibor Benedek; István Dóczi; Péter Kuna; Csaba Mészáros; Gábor Nemes; Imre Péter; Zsolt Petőváry; Gábor Schmiedt; Tibor Sprok; Frank Tóth; Imre Tóth; László Tóth; Balázs Vincze Head coach: Tibor Benedek
Women	Netherlands Karla van der Boon (goal), Hellen Boering (goal), Irma Brander, Edmée Hiemstra, Monique Kranenburg, Karin Kuipers, Patricia Libregts, Alice Lindhout, Lilian Ossendrijver, Janny Spijker, Esmeralda van den Water, Marjan op den Velde, Hedda Verdam. Head coach: Peter van den Biggelaar.	Canada	United States
