= Water polo at the 2024 World Aquatics Championships – Women's team rosters =

This article shows the roster of all participating teams at the women's water polo tournament at the 2024 World Aquatics Championships.

== Group A ==
=== Brazil ===
The following is Brazilian roster.

Head coach: Paulo Rocha

- 1 Isabela Souza GK
- 2 Yandra Ramos FP
- 3 Luana Bonetti FP
- 4 Karen Silva FP
- 5 Stefany Azevedo FP
- 6 Jennifer Cavalcante FP
- 7 Samantha Ferreira FP
- 8 Debora Silva FP
- 9 Letícia Belorio FP
- 10 Rebecca Moreir FP
- 11 Mirella Coutinho FP
- 12 Maiah Nascimento FP
- 13 Hemanuelle Scalabrin GK
- 14 Ana Vasconcelos FP

=== Kazakhstan ===
The following is the Kazakh roster.

Head coach: Marina Pertseva

- 1 Valeriya Kolesnichenko GK
- 2 Darya Pochinok FP
- 3 Anastasiya Glukhova FP
- 4 Viktoriya Kaplun FP
- 5 Valeriya Anossova FP
- 6 Madina Rakhmanova FP
- 7 Anna Novikova FP
- 8 Yelizaveta Rudneva FP
- 9 Milena Nabiyeva FP
- 10 Viktoriya Khritankova FP
- 11 Anastassiya Mirshina FP
- 12 Anastassiya Tsoy FP
- 13 Mariya Martynenko GK
- 14 Yuliya Druzhinina FP
- 15 Olga Vorontsova FP

=== Netherlands ===
The following is the Dutch roster.

Head coach: Evangelos Doudesis

- 1 Laura Aarts GK
- 2 Iris Wolves FP
- 3 Brigitte Sleeking FP
- 4 Sabrina van der Sloot FP
- 5 Maartje Keuning FP
- 6 Simone van de Kraats FP
- 7 Bente Rogge FP
- 8 Vivian Sevenich FP
- 9 Kitty-Lynn Joustra FP
- 10 Lieke Rogge FP
- 11 Lola Moolhuijzen FP
- 12 Nina ten Broek FP
- 13 Sarah Buis GK
- 14 Marit van der Weijden FP
- 15 Maxine Schaap FP

=== United States ===
The following is the American roster.

Head coach: Adam Krikorian

- 1 Ashleigh Johnson GK
- 2 Maddie Musselman FP
- 3 Tara Prentice FF
- 4 Rachel Fattal FP
- 5 Jenna Flynn FP
- 6 Maggie Steffens FP
- 7 Jordan Raney FP
- 8 Ryann Neushul FP
- 9 Jewel Roemer FP
- 10 Kaleigh Gilchrist FP
- 11 Bayley Weber FP
- 12 Emily Ausmus FP
- 13 Amanda Longan GK
- 14 Jovana Sekulic FP
- 15 Denise Mammolito FP

== Group B ==
=== China ===
The following is the Chinese roster.

Head coach: Juan Jané

- 1 Zhang Jiaqi GK
- 2 Yan Siya FP
- 3 Yan Jing FP
- 4 Xiong Dunhan FP
- 5 Zhong Qiyun FP
- 6 Wang Shiyun FP
- 7 Lu Yiwen FP
- 8 Wang Huan FP
- 9 Deng Zewen FP
- 10 Nong Sanfeng FP
- 11 Li Ziqi FP
- 12 Zhang Jing FP
- 13 Dong Wenxin GK
- 14 Wang Xuan FP
- 15 Xie Liyi FP

=== France ===
The following is French roster.

Head coach: (France) Theodoros Lorantos

- 1 Mia Rycraw GK
- 2 Lara Andres D
- 3 Valentine Heurtaux CB
- 4 Camelia Bouloukbachi FP
- 5 Louise Guillet D
- 6 Orsolya Hertzka D
- 7 Juliette Dhalluin D
- 8 Aurelie Battu CF
- 9 Ema Vernoux FP
- 10 Camille Radosavljevic FP
- 11 Tiziana Raspo FP
- 12 Audrey Daule D
- 13 Pasiphaé Martineaud Peret GK
- 14 Erica Hardy FP
- 15 Lily Vernoux FP

=== Greece ===
The following is the Greek roster.

Head coach: Alexia Kammenou

- 1 Chrysi Diamantopoulou GK
- 2 Eleftheria Plevritou FP
- 3 Ioanna Chydirioti FP
- 4 Nikoleta Eleftheriadou FP
- 5 Margarita Plevritou FP
- 6 Eleni Xenaki FP
- 7 Alexandra Asimaki FP
- 8 Maria Patra FP
- 9 Eirini Ninou FP
- 10 Vasiliki Plevritou FP
- 11 Athina Giannopoulos FP
- 12 Maria Myriokefalitaki FP
- 13 Ioanna Stamatopoulou GK
- 14 Eleni Elliniadi FP
- 15 Foteini Tricha FP

=== Spain ===
The following is the Spanish roster.

Head coach: Miki Oca

- 1 Laura Ester GK
- 2 Cristina Nogué FP
- 3 Anni Espar FP
- 4 Beatriz Ortiz FP
- 5 Nona Pérez FP
- 6 Paula Crespí FP
- 7 Elena Ruiz FP
- 8 Pili Peña FP
- 9 Judith Forca FP
- 10 Paula Camus FP
- 11 Maica García Godoy FP
- 12 Paula Leitón FP
- 13 Martina Terré GK
- 14 Ariadna Ruiz FP
- 15 Isabel Piralkova FP

== Group C ==
=== Australia ===
The following is the Australian roster.

Head coach: Rebecca Rippon

- 1 Gabriella Palm GK
- 2 Keesja Gofers FP
- 3 Sienna Hearn FP
- 4 Bronte Halligan FP
- 5 Bridget Leeson-Smith FP
- 6 Abby Andrews FP
- 7 Charlize Andrews FP
- 8 Sofie Pontre FP
- 9 Zoe Arancini FP
- 10 Alice Williams FP
- 11 Matilda Kearns FP
- 12 Tenealle Fasala FP
- 13 Genevieve Longman GK
- 14 Sienna Green FP
- 15 Danijela Jackvoch FP

=== Hungary ===
The following is the Hungarian roster.

Head coach: Attila Mihók

- 1 Alda Magyari GK
- 2 Dorottya Szilágyi FP
- 3 Vanda Vályi FP
- 4 Gréta Gurisatti FP
- 5 Géraldine Mahieu FP
- 6 Rebecca Parkes FP
- 7 Zsuzsanna Máté FP
- 8 Rita Keszthelyi FP
- 9 Dóra Leimeter FP
- 10 Natasa Rybanska FP
- 11 Kamilla Faragó FP
- 12 Krisztina Garda FP
- 13 Boglárka Neszmély GK
- 14 Brigitta Horváth FP
- 15 Szonja Kuna FP

=== New Zealand ===
The following is the New Zealand roster.

Head coach: Angela Winstanley-Smith

- 1 Jessica Milicich GK
- 2 Emily Nicholson FP
- 3 Bernadette Doyle FP
- 4 Libby Gault FP
- 5 Gabrielle Milicich FP
- 6 Morgan McDowall FP
- 7 Emmerson Houghton FP
- 8 Katie McKenty FP
- 9 Isabelle Jackson FP
- 10 Kaitlin Howarth FP
- 11 Kate Henderson FP
- 12 Gabriella MacDonald FP
- 13 Bridget Layburn GK
- 14 Gabrielle Doyle FP

=== Singapore ===
The following is the Singaporian roster.

Head coach: Yu Lei

- 1 Rochelle Ong GK
- 2 Charlene Tio FP
- 3 Zhu Zhiyun FP
- 4 Yap Jingxuan FP
- 5 Koh Ting Ting FP
- 6 Nicole Lim FP
- 7 Abielle Yeo FP
- 8 Melissa Chan FP
- 9 Heather Lee FP
- 10 Gan Huimin FP
- 11 Wan Celeste FP
- 12 Juni Ong FP
- 13 Mounisha Devi GK

== Group D ==
=== Canada ===
The following is the Canadian roster.

Head coach: David Paradelo

- 1 Jessica Gaudreault GK
- 2 Rae Lekness FP
- 3 Axelle Crevier D
- 4 Emma Wright CB
- 5 Daphné Guèvremont FP
- 6 Blaire McDowell FP
- 7 Verica Bakoc D
- 8 Elyse Lemay-Lavoie FP
- 9 Hayley McKelvey CB
- 10 Serena Browne FP
- 11 Kindred Paul D
- 12 Shae La Roche D
- 13 Clara Vulpisi GK
- 14 Marilia Mimides FP
- 15 Floranne Carroll FP

=== Great Britain ===
The following is the Britain roster.

Head coach: Nick Buller

- 1 Sophie Jackson GK
- 2 Anya Clapperton FP
- 3 Amelia Peters FP
- 4 Cecily Turner FP
- 5 Toula Falvey FP
- 6 Katie Brown FP
- 7 Katy Cutler FP
- 8 Brooke Tafazolli FP
- 9 Katherine Rogers FP
- 10 Niamh Moloney FP
- 11 Lotte van Wingerden FP
- 12 Victoria Hawkins FP
- 13 Alexandria Robinson GK

=== Italy ===
The following is the Italian roster.

Head coach: Carlo Silipo

- 1 Aurora Condorelli GK
- 2 Chiara Tabani FP
- 3 Giuditta Galardi FP
- 4 Silvia Avegno FP
- 5 Sofia Giustini FP
- 6 Dafne Bettini FP
- 7 Domitilla Picozzi FP
- 8 Roberta Bianconi FP
- 9 Valeria Palmieri FP
- 10 Claudia Marletta FP
- 11 Agnese Cocchiere FP
- 12 Giulia Viacava FP
- 13 Caterina Banchelli GK
- 14 Lucrezia Cergol FP
- 15 Veronica Gant FP

=== South Africa ===
The following is the South African roster.

Head coach: Nicola Barrett

- 1 Meghan Maartens GK
- 2 Amber Penney FP
- 3 Annie Thornton-Dibb FP
- 4 Boati Motau FP
- 5 Megan Sileno FP
- 6 Amica Hallendorff FP
- 7 Shakira January FP
- 8 Esihle Zondo FP
- 9 Ruby Versfeld FP
- 10 Nicola Macleod FP
- 11 Chloe Meecham FP
- 12 Kelsey White FP
- 13 Daniela Passoni GK
- 14 Tumaini Macdonell FP
- 15 Yanah Geber FP
