= Daniëlle de Bruijn =

Dutch water polo player (born 1978)

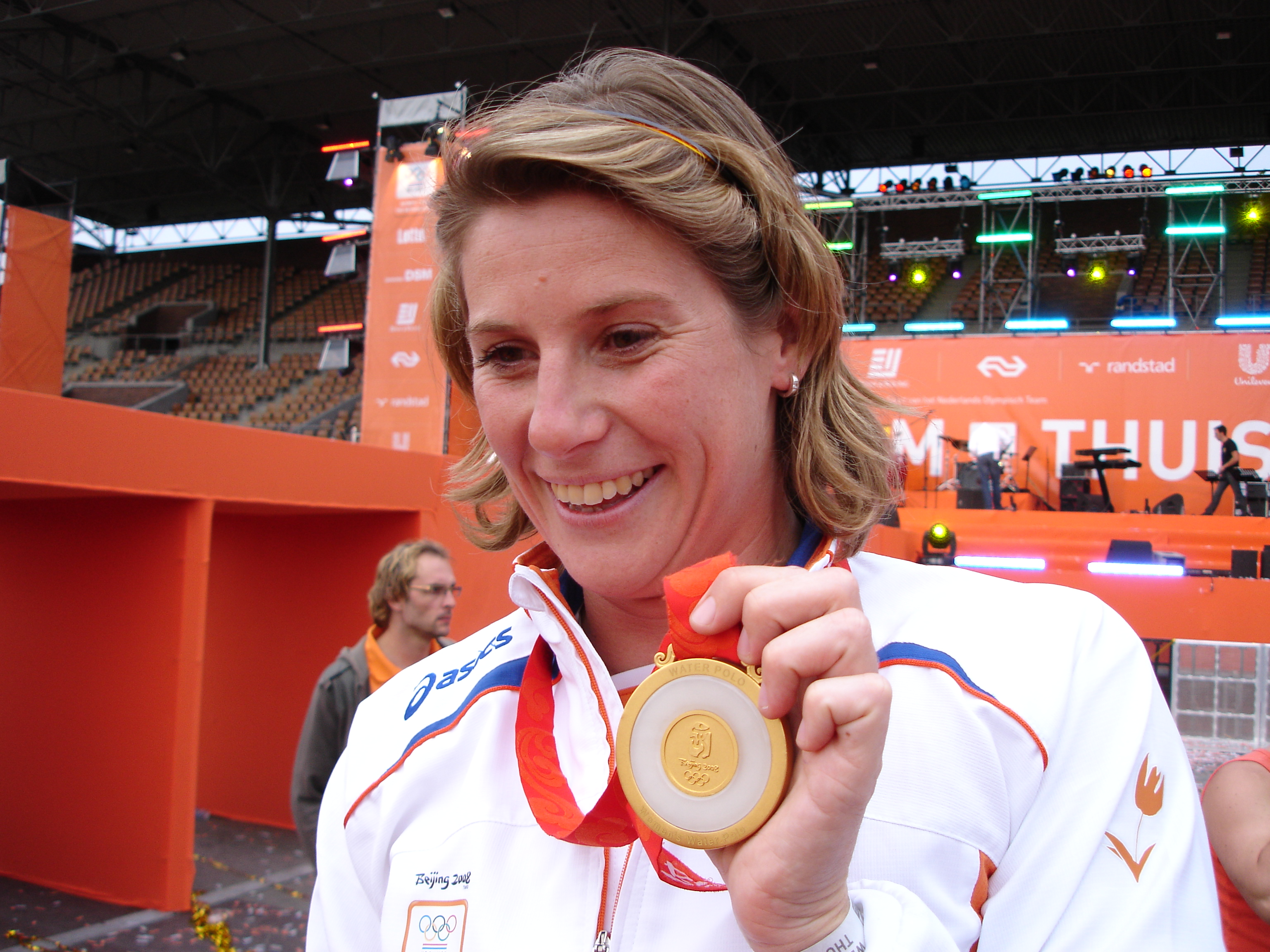
- de Bruijn at 2008 Summer Olympics

Personal information
- Born: February 13, 1978 (age 48) Vlaardingen, Netherlands

Sport
- Sport: Water polo
Medal record
Representing the Netherlands
Olympic Games
Gold medal – first place	2008 Beijing	Team competition
World Championships
Silver medal – second place	1998 Perth	Team competition
European Championships
Silver medal – second place	1999 Prato	Team competition
Bronze medal – third place	1997 Sevilla	Team competition

Daniëlle de Bruijn (born 13 February 1978) is a water polo player of the Netherlands who represents the Dutch national team in international competitions.

De Bruijn was part of the team that won the bronze medal at the 1997 Women's European Water Polo Championship in Seville. They also won silver at the 1998 World Aquatics Championships in Perth, gold at the 1999 FINA Women's Water Polo World Cup in Winnipeg and silver at the 1999 Women's European Water Polo Championship in Prato. All these results made them one of the favourites for the first ever women's Olympic tournament at the 2000 Summer Olympics held in Sydney, and they finished in fourth position in Australia. It was the start of a less successful period for the Dutch team as they got the fifth place at the 2001 Women's European Water Polo Championship in Budapest, the 9th place at the 2001 FINA Women's World Water Polo Championship in Fukuoka and the sixth place at the 2003 World Aquatics Championships in Barcelona.

After the team failed to qualify for the 2004 Summer Olympics in Athens, de Bruijn retired her national career until her return at the 2007 World Aquatics Championships in Melbourne, where they finished in 9th position. They started a new campaign with a mix of experienced and talented players to work towards a new top team for the 2008 Summer Olympics in Beijing. The Dutch team finished in fifth place at the 2008 Women's European Water Polo Championship in Málaga. In Kirishi they qualified for the 2008 Summer Olympics in Beijing. There they ended up winning the gold medal on 21 August, beating the United States 9–8 in the final. De Bruijn became the tournament's top goalscorer with 17 goals, including seven goals in the final.

In 2008, de Bruijn was named one of Swimming World magazines 2008 Water Polo Players of the Year.

== See also ==
- Netherlands women's Olympic water polo team records and statistics
- List of Olympic champions in women's water polo
- List of Olympic medalists in water polo (women)
- List of women's Olympic water polo tournament top goalscorers
- List of World Aquatics Championships medalists in water polo

Awards
Preceded by First award	LEN European Water Polo Player of the Year; 2008	Succeeded by (Netherlands) Iefke van Belkum
