= Ingrid Leijendekker =

Dutch water polo player (born 1975)

Personal information
- Born: 3 October 1975 (age 50)
Medal record
Women's water polo
Representing the Netherlands
World Championship
Silver medal – second place	1994 Rome	Team competition
Silver medal – second place	1998 Perth	Team competition
European Championship
Gold medal – first place	1993 Leeds	Team competition
Silver medal – second place	1999 Prato	Team competition
Bronze medal – third place	1995 Vienna	Team competition
Bronze medal – third place	1997 Seville	Team competition
FINA World Cup
Gold medal – first place	1993 Catania	Team competition
Gold medal – first place	1997 Nancy	Team competition
Gold medal – first place	1999 Winnipeg	Team competition
Silver medal – second place	1995 Sydney	Team competition

Ingrid Margaretha Cornelia Leijendekker (born 3 October 1975 in Zaandam, North Holland) is a retired water polo player from the Netherlands. She made her debut for the Women's National Team in 1992, and was a regular member of the squad that claimed many international titles during the 1990s.

Leijendekker competed for her native country at the 2000 Summer Olympics in Sydney, Australia, finishing in fourth place. She was named Most Valuable Player at the 1999 FINA Women's Water Polo World Cup in Sydney.

== See also ==
- List of World Aquatics Championships medalists in water polo
