= World Aquatics Women's Water Polo World Cup =

International women's water polo tournament

- Current season, competition or edition: 2026 FINA Women's Water Polo World Cup
- Sport: Water polo
- Founded: 1979
- Continent: All (International)
- Most recent champion: United States (6th title)
- Most titles: Netherlands (8 titles)

The World Aquatics Women's Water Polo World Cup is an international water polo competition contested by women's national water polo teams that are members of the World Aquatics, the aquatic sports' global governing body. The tournament was established in 1979 with an erratic schedule, was contested every two years from 1989 to 1999, and has been contested every four years since 2002.

== Format change ==
From 2023 on, the tournament replaced the FINA Water Polo World League and changed format.

== Editions ==
| # | Year | Host | Champion | Runner-up | Third place |
|---|---|---|---|---|---|
| 1 | 1979 | Merced, United States | United States | Netherlands | Australia |
| 2 | 1980 | Breda, Netherlands | Netherlands | United States | Canada |
| 3 | 1981 | Brisbane, Australia | Canada | Netherlands | Australia |
| 4 | 1983 | Sainte-Foy, Québec, Canada | Netherlands | United States | Australia |
| 5 | 1984 | Irvine, United States | Australia | United States | Netherlands |
| 6 | 1988 | Christchurch, New Zealand | Netherlands | Hungary | Canada |
| 7 | 1989 | Eindhoven, Netherlands | Netherlands | United States | Hungary |
| 8 | 1991 | Long Beach, United States | Netherlands | Australia | United States |
| 9 | 1993 | Catania, Italy | Netherlands | Italy | Hungary |
| 10 | 1995 | Sydney, Australia | Australia | Netherlands | Hungary |
| 11 | 1997 | Nancy, France | Netherlands | Russia | Australia |
| 12 | 1999 | Winnipeg, Canada | Netherlands | Australia | Italy |
| 13 | 2002 | Perth, Australia | Hungary | United States | Canada |
| 14 | 2006 | Tianjin, PR China | Australia | Italy | Russia |
| 15 | 2010 | Christchurch, New Zealand | United States | Australia | China |
| 16 | 2014 | Khanty-Mansiysk, Russia | United States | Australia | Spain |
| 17 | 2018 | Surgut, Russia | United States | Russia | Australia |
New Format (Division 1 + Division 2)
| 18 | 2023 | Long Beach, United States | United States | Netherlands | Spain |
| 19 | 2025 | Chengdu, China | Greece | Hungary | Netherlands |
| 20 | 2026 | Sydney, Australia | United States | Spain | Australia |
| 20 | 2027 | Athens, Greece | | | |

== Medal table ==
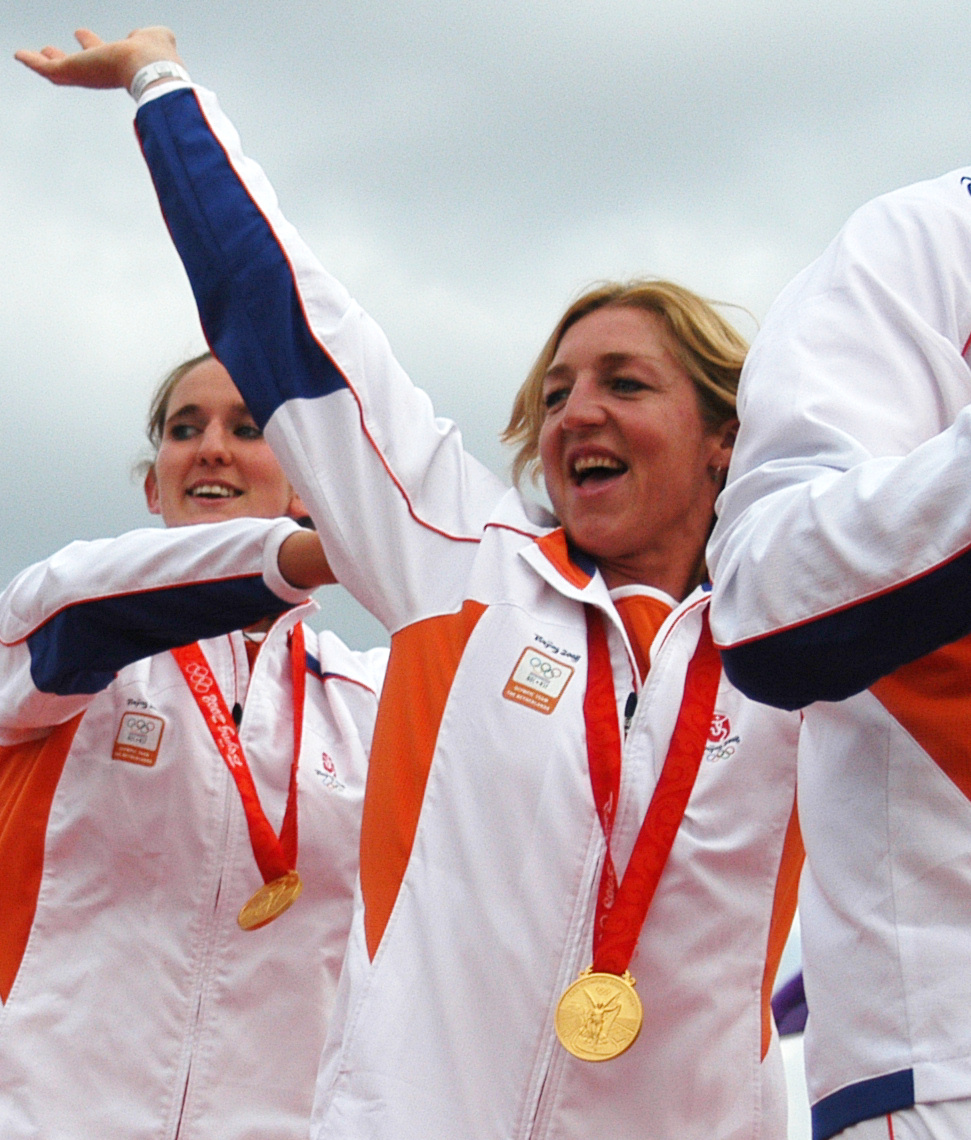
Gillian van den Berg won the competition in 1999 as part of the Dutch team. In the photo she is seen celebrating her gold medal at the 2008 Summer Olympics.

| Rank | Nation | Gold | Silver | Bronze | Total |
|---|---|---|---|---|---|
| 1 | Netherlands | 8 | 4 | 2 | 14 |
| 2 | United States | 6 | 5 | 1 | 12 |
| 3 | Australia | 3 | 4 | 6 | 13 |
| 4 | Hungary | 1 | 2 | 3 | 6 |
| 5 | Canada | 1 | 0 | 3 | 4 |
| 6 | Greece | 1 | 0 | 0 | 1 |
| 7 | Italy | 0 | 2 | 1 | 3 |
| 7 | Russia | 0 | 2 | 1 | 3 |
| 9 | Spain | 0 | 1 | 2 | 3 |
| 10 | China | 0 | 0 | 1 | 1 |
| Totals (10 entries) | | 20 | 20 | 20 | 60 |

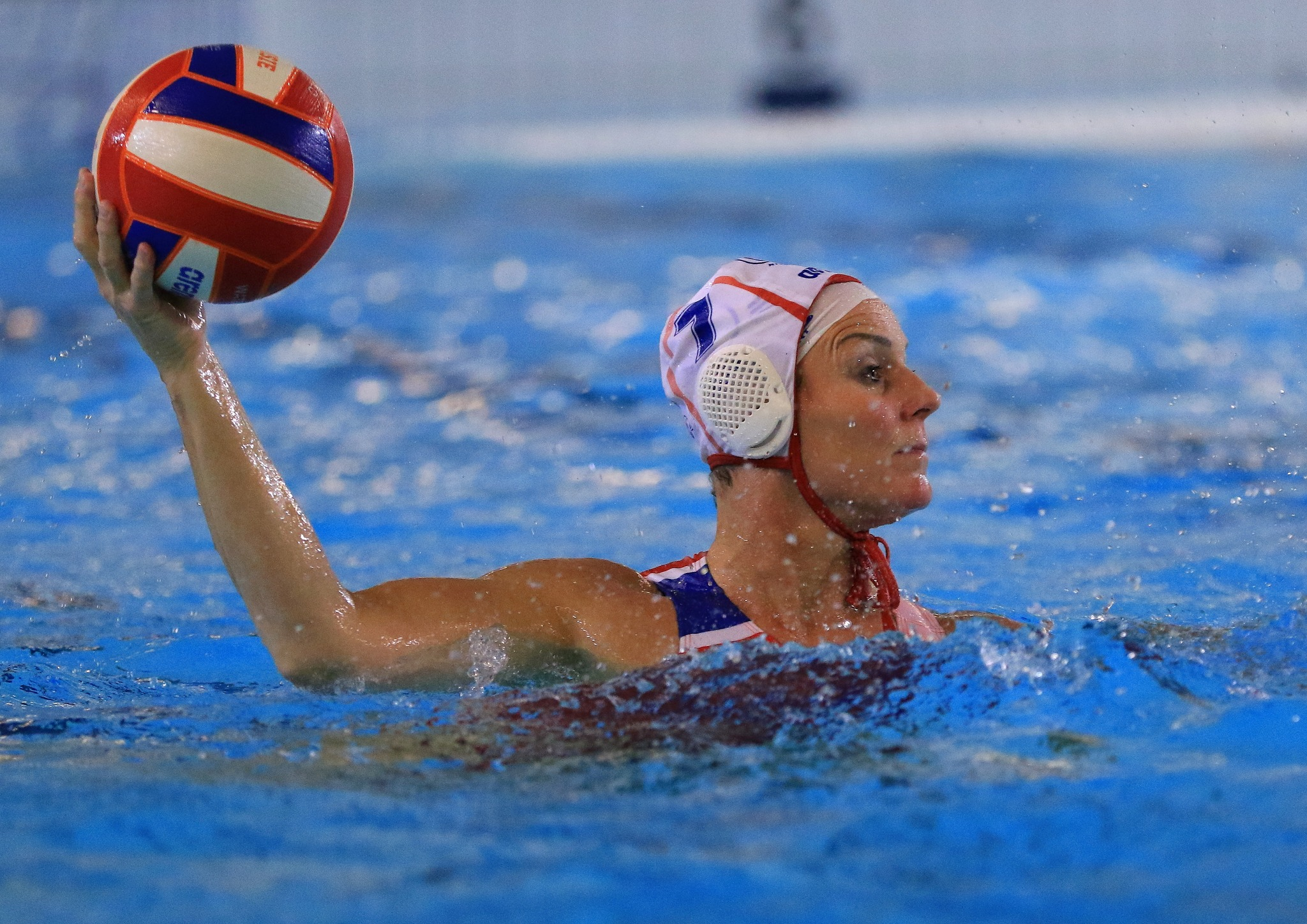
Karin Kuipers is one of the best players of the 90s: a 3 time best player of the world, 4 time World Cup winner (1x runner-up), World Champion (2x runner-up), European Champion (1x runner-up) and an ISHOF-member.

== Participation details ==
Legend

- 1st – Champions
- 2nd – Runners-up
- 3rd – Third place
- 4th – Fourth place
- – Hosts
- Q – Qualified for forthcoming tournament
- ^{†} – Defunct team

Africa – CANA (1 team)
| Team | 1979 | 1980 | 1981 | 1983 | 1984 | 1988 | 1989 | 1991 | 1993 | 1995 | 1997 | 1999 | 2002 | 2006 | 2010 | 2014 | 2018 | 2023 | 2025 | 2026 | 2027 | Years |
| South Africa | | | | | | | | | | | | | | | | 7th | 8th | | | | | 2 |
Americas – ASUA (4 teams)
| Brazil | | | | | | | | 8th | | | | | | | | | | | | | | 1 |
| Canada | 4th | 3rd | 1st | 4th | | 3rd | 4th | 4th | 6th | | 5th | 5th | 3rd | 7th | 5th | | 6th | | | | | 14 |
| Puerto Rico | | | | | | 7th | | | | | | | | | | | | | | | | 1 |
| United States | 1st | 2nd | 4th | 2nd | 2nd | 4th | 2nd | 3rd | 5th | 6th | 7th | 6th | 2nd | 4th | 1st | 1st | 1st | 1st | | 1st | | 19 |
Asia – AASF (4 teams)
| China | | | | | | | | | | | | | | 8th | 3rd | 4th | 5th | | 8th | 8th | | 6 |
| Japan | | | | | | | | 6th | 7th | | | | | | | | | | 7th | | | 3 |
| Kazakhstan | | | | | | | | | 8th | | | | 8th | | | | | | | | | 2 |
| Singapore | | | | | | | | | | | | | | | | 7th | | | | | | 1 |
Europe – LEN (9 teams)
| France | | | | | | | 7th | | | 7th | 8th | | | | | | | | | | | 3 |
| Germany; West Germany^{†} | | | | | | | 6th | | | | | | | | | | | | | | | 1 |
| Greece | | | | | | | | | | | 6th | 8th | 7th | 6th | 7th | | | 5th | 1st | | Q | 8 |
| Hungary | | | | | | 2nd | 3rd | | 3rd | 3rd | | 4th | 1st | 5th | 6th | 5th | | 4th | 2nd | 7th | | 12 |
| Israel | | | | | | | | | | | | | | | | | | 7th | | | | 1 |
| Italy | | | | | | | 8th | 5th | 2nd | 5th | 4th | 3rd | 5th | 2nd | | | | 6th | 6th | 6th | | 11 |
| Netherlands | 2nd | 1st | 2nd | 1st | 3rd | 1st | 1st | 1st | 1st | 2nd | 1st | 1st | | | | | | 2nd | 3rd | 5th | | 15 |
| Russia | | | | | | | | | | 4th | 2nd | 7th | 4th | 3rd | 4th | 6th | 2nd | | | 4th | | 9 |
| Spain | | | | | | | | | | | | | | | | 3rd | 4th | 3rd | 4th | 2nd | | 5 |
Oceania – OSA (2 teams)
| Australia | 3rd | 4th | 3rd | 3rd | 1st | 5th | 5th | 2nd | 4th | 1st | 3rd | 2nd | 6th | 1st | 2nd | 2nd | 3rd | | 5th | 3rd | | 19 |
| New Zealand | 5th | | | | 4th | 6th | | 7th | | 8th | | | | | 8th | | 7th | 8th | | | | 8 |
| Total teams | 5 | 4 | 4 | 4 | 4 | 7 | 8 | 8 | 8 | 8 | 8 | 8 | 8 | 8 | 8 | 8 | 8 | 8 | 8 | 8 | 8 | |

== See also ==
- FINA Water Polo World Cup
- List of water polo world medalists
- Major achievements in water polo by nation
