= Karin Kuipers =

Dutch water polo player (born 1972)

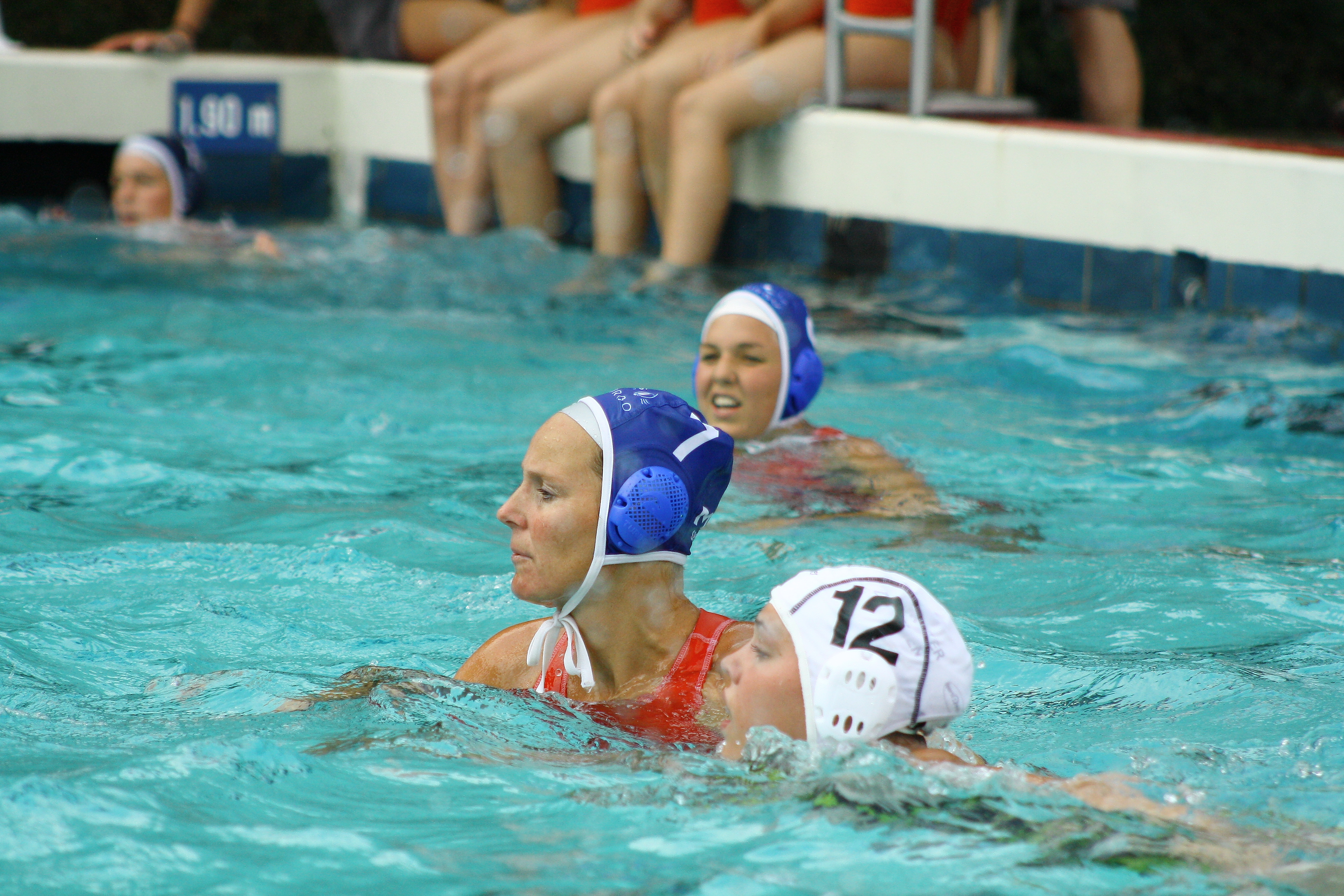
- Karin Kuipers

Personal information
- Full name: Karin Hendrika Maria Kuipers
- Born: 18 July 1972 (age 54) Zwolle, Netherlands

Sport
- Sport: Water polo
National team
- Years: Team
- 1990–2004: Netherlands
Medal record
Women's water polo
Representing the Netherlands
World Championships
| Gold medal – first place | 1991 Perth | Team competition |
| Silver medal – second place | 1994 Rome | Team competition |
| Silver medal – second place | 1998 Perth | Team competition |
FINA World Cup
| Gold medal – first place | 1991 Long Beach | Team competition |
| Gold medal – first place | 1993 Catania | Team competition |
| Silver medal – second place | 1995 Sydney | Team competition |
| Gold medal – first place | 1997 Nancy | Team competition |
| Gold medal – first place | 1999 Winnipeg | Team competition |
European Championships
| Silver medal – second place | 1991 Athens | Team competition |
| Gold medal – first place | 1993 Leeds | Team competition |
| Bronze medal – third place | 1995 Vienna | Team competition |
| Bronze medal – third place | 1997 Seville | Team competition |
| Silver medal – second place | 1999 Prato | Team competition |
- Updated on 30 March 2016

Karin Hendrika Maria Kuipers (born 18 July 1972 in Zwolle) is a retired Dutch water polo player.

Famous for her killing shots, she was a three time best player of the world.

She competed in the 2000 Summer Olympics.

In 2014, she was inducted in the International Swimming Hall of Fame.

== See also ==
- List of world champions in women's water polo
- List of members of the International Swimming Hall of Fame
- List of World Aquatics Championships medalists in water polo
