= Mirjam Overdam =

Dutch water polo player (born 1973)

Personal information
- Nationality: Netherlands
- Born: 18 February 1973 (age 53) Waddinxveen, the Netherlands
- Height: 1.78 m (5 ft 10 in)
- Weight: 64 kg (141 lb)

Sport
- Sport: Water polo

Senior clubs
- Years: Team
- –: Gouwestaete
- –: Waddinxveen
National team
- Years: Team
- ?-?: Netherlands
Medal record
Representing Netherlands
European Championships
Silver medal – second place	1999 Prato	Team competition
Bronze medal – third place	1997 Seville	Team competition

Mirjam Overdam (born 18 February 1973) was a Dutch female water polo player. She was a member of the Netherlands women's national water polo team.

She competed with the team at the 2000 Summer Olympics.
