= Gillian van den Berg =

Dutch water polo player (born 1971)

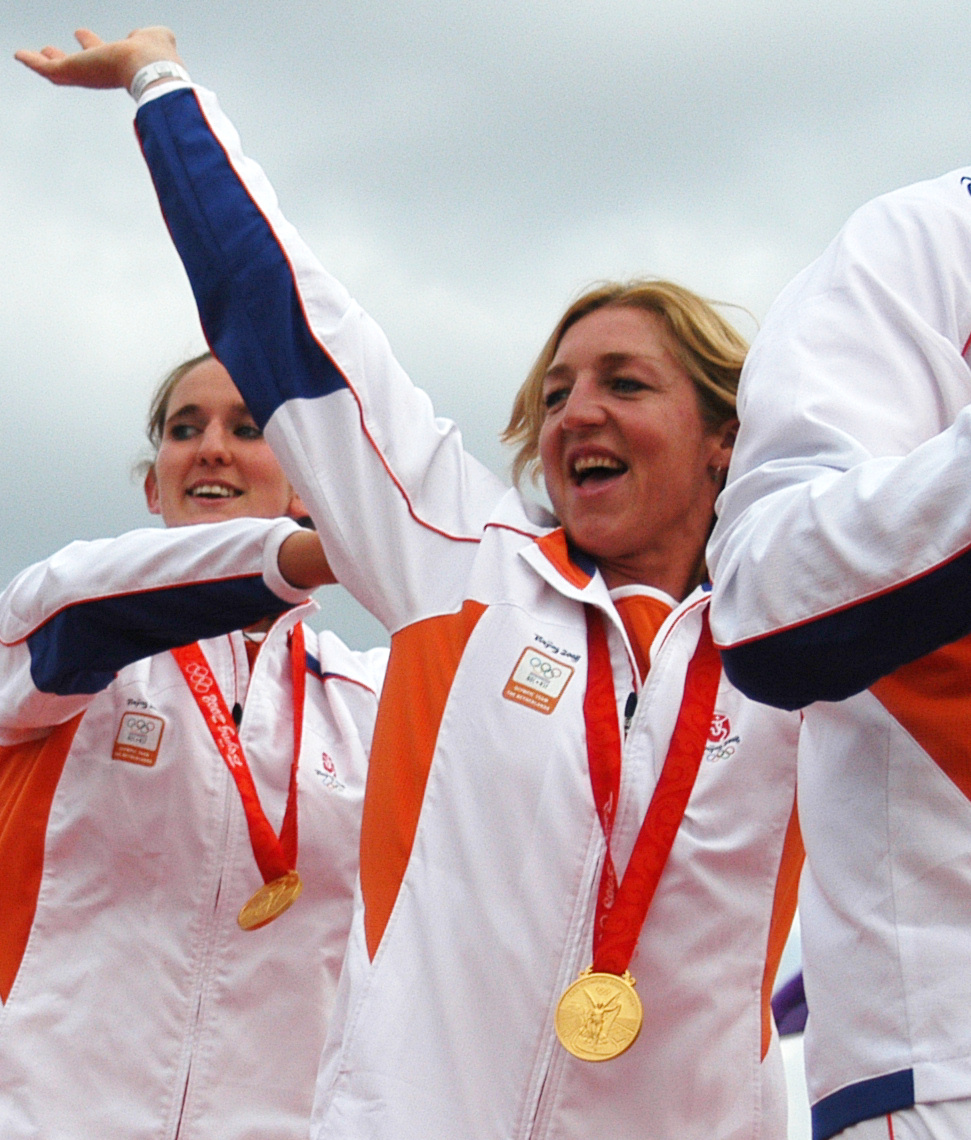
- van den Berg at 2008 Summer Olympics

Personal information
- Full name: Gillian Maria Elisabeth van den Berg
- Born: 8 September 1971 (age 55) Gouda, South Holland, Netherlands
- Height: 173 cm (5 ft 8 in)
- Weight: 66 kg (146 lb)
Medal record
Women's water polo
Representing the Netherlands
Olympic Games
| Gold medal – first place | 2008 Beijing | Team competition |
World Championships
| Silver medal – second place | 1994 Rome | Team competition |
| Silver medal – second place | 1998 Perth | Team competition |
European Championships
| Bronze medal – third place | 1995 Vienna | Team competition |
| Bronze medal – third place | 1997 Sevilla | Team competition |

Gillian Maria Elisabeth van den Berg (born 8 September 1971) is a water polo player of the Netherlands who represents the Dutch national team in international competitions.

van den Berg was part of the team that won the gold medal at the 1993 Women's European Water Polo Championship as well as the 1993 FINA Women's Water Polo World Cup. At the 1994 World Aquatics Championships in Rome they won the silver medal and at the 1995 Women's European Water Polo Championship in Vienna they won the bronze medal. In Emmen they won the gold medal at the 1996 Women's Water Polo Olympic Year Tournament as the sport was not yet recognized as an Olympic sport for women by the IOC. The Dutch stayed successful in the following years winning gold at the 1997 FINA Women's Water Polo World Cup, bronze at the 1997 Women's European Water Polo Championship in Sevilla, silver at the 1998 World Aquatics Championships in Perth, gold at the 1999 FINA Women's Water Polo World Cup in Winnipeg and silver at the 1999 Women's European Water Polo Championship in Prato. All these results made them one of the favourites for the first ever women's Olympic tournament at the 2000 Summer Olympics held in Sydney. In a disappointing event they eventually finished in fourth position in Australia, remaining medalless for the first time in history. It was the start of a less successful period for the Dutch team and they got the fifth place at the 2001 Women's European Water Polo Championship in Budapest, the 9th place at the 2001 FINA Women's World Water Polo Championship in Fukuoka and the sixth place at the 2003 World Aquatics Championships in Barcelona.

As of 2004, after the Dutch failed to qualify for the 2004 Summer Olympics in Athens, van den Berg did no longer play for the Dutch team until her return at the 2007 World Aquatics Championships in Melbourne, where they finished in 9th position. They started a new campaign with a mix of experienced and talented players to work towards a new top team for the 2012 Summer Olympics in London. The Dutch team finished in fifth place at the 2008 Women's European Water Polo Championship in Málaga and had qualified for the 2008 Summer Olympics in Beijing already in 2007 as continental representative of Europe. There they ended up winning the gold medal on 21 August, beating the United States 9–8 in the final.

== See also ==
- Netherlands women's Olympic water polo team records and statistics
- List of Olympic champions in women's water polo
- List of Olympic medalists in water polo (women)
- List of World Aquatics Championships medalists in water polo
