= Ekaterina Aleksandrovna Vasilieva =

Russian water polo player

Personal information
- Born: 30 May 1976 (age 50) Moscow
Medal record
Women's water polo
Representing Russia
Olympic Games
Bronze medal – third place	2000 Sydney	Team competition
European Championship
Bronze medal – third place	1999 Prato	Team competition

Ekaterina Aleksandrovna Vasilieva (Russian: Екатерина Александровна Васильева, born 30 May 1976) is a Russian water polo player, who won the bronze medal at the 2000 Summer Olympics.

== See also ==
- List of Olympic medalists in water polo (women)
