= Carla Quint =

Dutch water polo player (born 1972)

Personal information
- Full name: Cornelia Antonia Quint
- Nationality: Netherlands
- Born: 22 September 1972 (age 54) Wageningen, the Netherlands
- Height: 1.80 m (5 ft 11 in)
- Weight: 84 kg (185 lb)

Sport
- Sport: Water polo

Senior clubs
- Years: Team
- –: ZPC Het Ravijn, Nijverdal
National team
- Years: Team
- ?-?: Netherlands
Medal record
Representing Netherlands
World Championships
Silver medal – second place	1998 Perth	Team competition
European Championships
Gold medal – first place	1993 Sheffield	Team competition
Silver medal – second place	1999 Prato	Team competition
Bronze medal – third place	1995 Vienna	Team competition
Bronze medal – third place	1997 Seville	Team competition

Cornelia Antonia "Carla" Quint (born 22 September 1972) is a Dutch former water polo player. She was a member of the Netherlands women's national water polo team.

She competed with the team at the 2000 Summer Olympics. She was also part of the national team at the 1998 World Aquatics Championships and 2003 World Aquatics Championships.

== See also ==
- List of World Aquatics Championships medalists in water polo
