= Holiday Cup =

The Holiday Cup is a water polo competition held in the United States since 1998.

It was established as a competition between four countries held in summer, and was expanded to six countries and moved to December.

== History ==
WOMEN'S HOLIDAY CUP
Year	Host	Gold	Silver	Bronze
1998; Details	Los Alamitos, United States	Australia	United States	Canada
1999; Details	Los Alamitos, United States	Australia	Canada	United States
2000; Details	Los Alamitos, United States	United States	Canada	Australia
2001; Details	Los Alamitos, United States	United States	Canada	Italy
2002; Details	Palo Alto, United States	United States	Canada	Brazil
2003; Details	Los Alamitos, United States	United States	Italy	Canada
2004; Details	La Jolla, United States	United States	Italy	Russia
2006; Details	Los Alamitos, United States	United States	Russia	Australia
2007; Details	Long Beach, United States	Italy	Netherlands	United States
2009; Details	Newport Beach, United States	Australia	United States	Canada
2012; Details	Los Alamitos, United States	United States	Canada	Italy

== Medal summary ==
Place	Nation	1st place, gold medalist(s)	2nd place, silver medalist(s)	3rd place, bronze medalist(s)	Total
1.	United States	7	2	2	11
2.	Australia	3	0	2	5
3.	Italy	1	2	1	4
4.	Canada	0	5	4	9
5.	Russia	0	1	1	2
6.	Netherlands	0	1	0	1
7.	Brazil	0	0	1	1
Total		11	11	11	33
