= 1980 FINA Women's Water Polo World Cup =

Tournament details
- Host country: Netherlands

Final positions
- Champions: Netherlands (1st title)
- Runners-up: United States
- Third place: Canada
- Fourth place: Australia

Official website
- FINA event site

The 1980 FINA Women's Water Polo World Cup was the second edition of the event, organised by the world's governing body in aquatics, the International Swimming Federation (FINA). The event took place in Breda, Netherlands, from July 11 to July 13, 1980. The five participating teams, including the Dutch youth team (out-of-competition), played a round robin to decide the winner of the event.

== Results Matrix ==
	NED	USA	CAN	AUS	NED II
Netherlands		8 – 7	4 – 4	7 – 6	18 – 0
United States	7 – 8		5 – 3	6 – 6	13 – 3
Canada	4 – 4	3 – 5		6 – 5	12 – 9
Australia	6 – 7	6 – 6	5 – 6		7 – 1
Netherlands II	0 – 18	3 – 13	9 – 12	1 – 7	

== Final standings ==
	Team	Points	G	W	D	L	GF	GA	Diff
1.	Netherlands	7	4	3	1	0	37	17	+20
2.	United States	5	4	2	1	1	31	20	+11
3.	Canada	5	4	2	1	1	25	23	+2
4.	Australia	3	4	1	1	2	24	20	+4
5.	Netherlands II	0	4	0	0	4	13	50	–37

== Final ranking ==
RANK	TEAM
	Netherlands
	United States
	Canada
4.	Australia
5.	Netherlands II

1980 Women's FINA World Cup winners

Netherlands
First title
