= Thijs Libregts =

Dutch footballer and coach

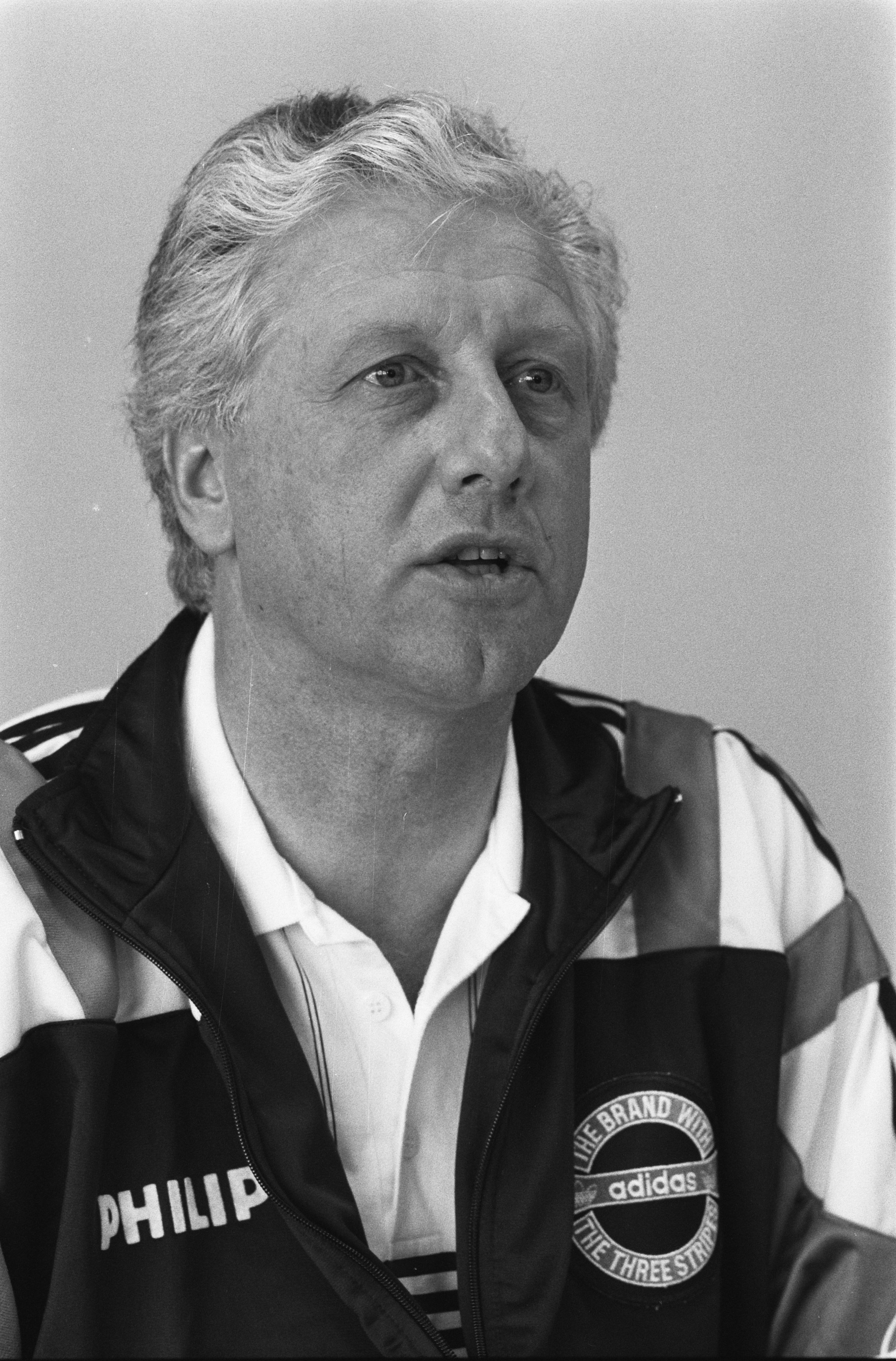
- Libregts in 1989

Personal information
- Date of birth: 4 January 1941 (age 85)
- Place of birth: Rotterdam, Netherlands
- Position: Defender

Senior career*
Years	Team	Apps	(Gls)
1958–1962	Excelsior Rotterdam		
1962–1968	Feyenoord		
1968–1972	Excelsior Rotterdam		

Managerial career
- 1975–1980: Excelsior Rotterdam
- 1980–1983: PSV Eindhoven
- 1983–1984: Feyenoord
- 1984–1986: Aris
- 1986–1987: PAOK
- 1987–1988: Olympiacos
- 1988–1989: Netherlands
- 1991–1994: Iraklis
- 1994–1995: Olympiacos
- 1998–1999: Nigeria
- 2001–2002: Grazer AK
- * Club domestic league appearances and goals

Thijs Libregts (Dutch pronunciation: [ˈtɛis ˈlibrɛxts]; born 4 January 1941) is a Dutch football coach and former player, who played professionally as a defender in the 1950s. His daughter Patricia was one of the Netherlands' leading water polo players in the 1980s and 1990s.

== Club career ==
Born in Rotterdam, Libregts began his playing career at Excelsior Rotterdam, where he played from 1958 to 1962. From Excelsior he moved to Rotterdam's larger team Feyenoord, where he remained until 1968. After six years at Feyenoord, Libregts returned to Excelsior where he played until 1972 when he announced his retirement.

== Managerial career ==
Libregts began his coaching career at Excelsior, first working with the youth teams before becoming assistant to head coach Ben Peeters. When Peeters left in 1973, Excelsior appointed Bob Janse as head coach with Libregts as his assistant, but the arrangement proved unsuccessful and the club were relegated. Libregts then took sole charge, and after reaching the promotion play-offs in his first full season, led Excelsior to the Eerste Divisie title in 1978–79, winning promotion to the Eredivisie. He remained at Excelsior until 1980, when he accepted an approach from PSV. Over three seasons at PSV he finished fifth, second and third in the Eredivisie, but won no trophies.

In 1983 Libregts moved to Feyenoord, where he won the league and cup double in his first and only season, with Johan Cruyff among the players in his squad.

In November 1984 Libregts moved to Greece with Aris, where he remained until 1986. In the 1986–87 season he joined PAOK, but his stay was brief and in December 1987 he switched to Olympiacos.

Libregts was appointed as Netherlands manager in 1988 as he took over from Rinus Michels as coach of the European champions. He guided the Netherlands to World Cup qualification unbeaten, but was dismissed on 20 December 1989 following a Volkskrant interview in which he was alleged to have made racist remarks about Ruud Gullit. Libregts denied the characterisation, stating the words had been taken out of context.

From 1991 to 1994 he was a coach with Iraklis in Greece and from 1994 to 1995 returned to coach Olympiacos. Having been dismissed by Olympiakos, Libregts took charge of the Nigeria national team in August 1998, who he managed until October 1999. After two years out of work Libregts joined Grazer AK in October 2001 where he remained until August 2002 and whom he led to the Cup, as well as to the victory in Supercup. In August 2002 he was replaced by Walter Schachner.
