= 2006 Holiday Cup =

Eighth edition of a women's water polo competition

Water polo at the 2006 Holiday Cup

Medalists
gold medal	United States
silver medal	Russia
bronze medal	Australia

Official logo

The 2006 Holiday Cup is the eighth edition of the women's water polo competition, held in Los Alamitos, United States. The tournament took place from 6 to 10 December 2006.

== Preliminary round ==
- 5 December 2006

Netherlands	13–13	Russia
Australia	12–9	Italy
United States	5–4	Canada

- 6 December 2006

Australia	13–15	Russia
Canada	14–12	Italy
United States	8–3	Netherlands

- 7 December 2006

Australia	13–13	Canada
Netherlands	14–15	Italy
United States	9–4	Russia

- 8 December 2006

Russia	10–9	Canada
Netherlands	9–10	Australia
United States	9–5	Italy

- 9 December 2006

Netherlands	8–8	Canada
Russia	13–12	Italy
United States	12–8	Australia

=== Standings ===
	Team	Points	G	W	D	L	GF	GA
1.	United States	10	5	5	0	0	43	24
2.	Russia	7	5	3	1	1	55	65
3.	Australia	5	5	2	1	2	56	58
4.	Canada	4	5	1	2	2	48	48
5.	Netherlands	2	5	0	2	3	47	54
6.	Italy	2	5	1	0	4	53	62

== Final round ==
=== 5th / 6th-place match ===
- 10 December 2006

Netherlands	11–9	Italy

=== Bronze-medal match ===
- 10 December 2006

Australia	10–9	Canada

=== Gold-medal match ===
- 10 December 2006

United States	15–8	Russia

== Final ranking ==
RANK	TEAM
	United States
	Russia
	Australia
4.	Canada
5.	Netherlands
6.	Italy

2006 Women's Holiday Cup

United States
Sixth title
