= Marjan op den Velde =

Dutch water polo player (born 1971)

Personal information
- Nationality: Netherlands
- Born: 9 January 1971 (age 55) Zaandam, the Netherlands
- Height: 1.81 m (5 ft 11 in)
- Weight: 72 kg (159 lb)

Sport
- Sport: Water polo

Senior clubs
- Years: Team
- –: ZWV Nereus, Zaandam
National team
- Years: Team
- ?-?: Netherlands
Medal record
Women's water polo
Representing the Netherlands
World Championship
Gold medal – first place	1991 Perth	Team competition
European Championships
Silver medal – second place	1991 Athens	Team competition
Silver medal – second place	1999 Prato	Team competition
Bronze medal – third place	1995 Vienna	Team competition
Bronze medal – third place	1997 Seville	Team competition

Marjan op den Velde (born 9 January 1971) is a Dutch former water polo player. She was a member of the Netherlands women's national water polo team.

She competed with the team at the 2000 Summer Olympics. She was also part of the national team at the 1991 World Aquatics Championship, 1998 World Aquatics Championships, 1999 Women's European Water Polo Championship and 1999 FINA Women's Water Polo World Cup.

== See also ==
- List of world champions in women's water polo
- List of World Aquatics Championships medalists in water polo
