= Hellen Boering =

Dutch water polo player (born 1964)

Personal information
- Born: July 27, 1964 (age 61)
Medal record
Women's water polo
Representing the Netherlands
World Championship
Gold medal – first place	1991 Perth	Team competition
Silver medal – second place	1986 Madrid	Team competition
Silver medal – second place	1994 Rome	Team competition
European Championship
Gold medal – first place	1987 Strasbourg	Team competition
Gold medal – first place	1989 Bonn	Team competition
Gold medal – first place	1993 Leeds	Team competition
Silver medal – second place	1991 Athens	Team competition
FINA World Cup
Gold medal – first place	1999 Winnipeg	Team competition

Heleen ("Hellen") Aafje Boering (born July 27, 1964 in Enschede, Overijssel) is a retired water polo goalkeeper from the Netherlands. She made her debut for the Women's National Team in 1984, and was on the squad that won the silver medal at the first official World Championship in women's water polo in 1986 (Madrid, Spain).

Boering competed for her native country at the 2000 Summer Olympics in Sydney, Australia, finishing in fourth place. Her biggest success came in 1991, when the Dutch won the 1991 World Aquatics Championship, defeating Canada in the final.

== See also ==
- Netherlands women's Olympic water polo team records and statistics
- List of women's Olympic water polo tournament goalkeepers
- List of world champions in women's water polo
- List of World Aquatics Championships medalists in water polo
