= Patricia Libregts =

Dutch water polo player (born 1966)

Personal information
- Born: February 22, 1966 (age 60)
Medal record
Women's water polo
Representing the Netherlands
World Championship
| Gold medal – first place | 1991 Perth | Team competition |
| Silver medal – second place | 1986 Madrid | Team competition |
European Championship
| Gold medal – first place | 1985 Oslo | Team competition |
| Gold medal – first place | 1987 Strasbourg | Team competition |
| Gold medal – first place | 1989 Bonn | Team competition |
| Silver medal – second place | 1991 Athens | Team competition |
FINA World Cup
| Gold medal – first place | 1999 Winnipeg | Team competition |

Patricia Megens-Libregts (born February 22, 1966, in Rotterdam, South Holland) is a retired water polo player from the Netherlands. She made her debut for the Women's National Team in 1984, and was on the squad that won the first official European title in women's water polo in 1985.

She competed for her native country at the 2000 Summer Olympics in Sydney, Australia, finishing in fourth place. Her biggest success came in 1991, when the Dutch won the world title, defeating Canada in the final. She is the mother of current national team-member Maud Megens and a daughter of former football (soccer) coach Thijs Libregts.

== See also ==
- List of world champions in women's water polo
- List of World Aquatics Championships medalists in water polo
