= Ellen van der Weijden-Bast =

Dutch water polo player (born 1971)

Personal information
- Full name: Eleonora Johanna van der Weijden-Bast
- Nationality: Netherlands
- Born: 29 August 1971 (age 55) Gouda, the Netherlands
- Height: 1.79 m (5 ft 10 in)
- Weight: 70 kg (150 lb)

Sport
- Sport: Water polo

Senior clubs
- Years: Team
- –: Gouwestaete, Waddinxveen
National team
- Years: Team
- ?-?: Netherlands
Medal record
Representing Netherlands
World Championships
| Silver medal – second place | 1994 Rome | Team competition |
| Silver medal – second place | 1998 Perth | Team competition |
European Championships
| Gold medal – first place | 1993 Sheffield | Team competition |
| Silver medal – second place | 1999 Prato | Team competition |
| Bronze medal – third place | 1995 Vienna | Team competition |
| Bronze medal – third place | 1997 Seville | Team competition |

Eleonora Johanna "Ellen" van der Weijden-Bast (born 29 August 1971) is a Dutch former water polo player. She was a member of the Netherlands women's national water polo team.

She competed with the team at the 2000 Summer Olympics and also at World Championships including the 1998 World Aquatics Championships.

== See also ==
- List of World Aquatics Championships medalists in water polo
