= 1983 FINA Women's Water Polo World Cup =

Tournament details
- Host country: Canada

Final positions
- Champions: Netherlands (2nd title)
- Runners-up: United States
- Third place: Australia
- Fourth place: Canada

Official website
- FINA event site

The 1983 FINA Women's Water Polo World Cup was the fourth edition of the event, organised by the world's governing body in aquatics, the International Swimming Federation (FINA). The event took place in Sainte-Foy, Quebec, Canada, from June 13 to June 19, 1983. The five participating teams, including the Canada's youth team (out-of-competition), played a full competition to decide the winner of the event.

== Results Matrix ==
	NED	USA	AUS	CAN
Netherlands		12 – 9; 10 – 10	11 – 7; 13 – 7	8 – 7; 5 – 9
United States	9 – 12; 10 – 10		9 – 7; 6 – 7	8 – 5; 7 – 6
Australia	7 – 11; 7 – 13	7 – 9; 7 – 6		5 – 5; 5 – 5
Canada	7 – 8; 9 – 5	5 – 8; 6 – 7	5 – 5; 5 – 5	

== Standings ==
	Team	Points	G	W	D	L	GF	GA	Diff
1.	Netherlands	9	6	4	1	1	59	49	+10
2.	United States	7	6	3	1	2	49	47	+2
3.	Australia	4	6	1	2	3	38	49	–11
4.	Canada	4	6	1	2	3	37	38	–1

== Finals ==
- June 19, 1983 — Bronze Medal Match

Australia	10 – 8	Canada

- June 19, 1983 — Gold Medal Match

Netherlands	11 – 7	United States

== Final ranking ==
RANK	TEAM
	Netherlands
	United States
	Australia
4.	Canada
5.	Canada II

1983 Women's FINA World Cup winners

Netherlands
Second title
