= Karla van der Boon =

Dutch water polo player (born 1968)

Personal information
- Born: 9 October 1968 (age 57)
Medal record
Women's water polo
Representing the Netherlands
World Championship
Gold medal – first place	1991 Perth	Team competition
Silver medal – second place	1994 Rome	Team competition
Silver medal – second place	1998 Perth	Team competition
European Championship
Gold medal – first place	1993 Leeds	Team competition
Silver medal – second place	1991 Athens	Team competition
Bronze medal – third place	1995 Vienna	Team competition
Bronze medal – third place	1997 Seville	Team competition
FINA World Cup
Gold medal – first place	1999 Winnipeg	Team competition

Karla Irene van der Boon (born 9 October 1968 in Zaandam, North Holland) is a retired water polo goalkeeper from the Netherlands, who after her marriage became known as Karla Plugge. She made her debut for the Women's National Team in 1991, and was on the squad that won the gold medal at the 1991 World Championship in Perth, Australia.

Van der Boon competed for her native country at the 2000 Summer Olympics in Sydney, Australia, finishing in fourth place. Her biggest success came in 1991, when the Dutch won the world title, defeating Canada in the final.

== See also ==
- Netherlands women's Olympic water polo team records and statistics
- List of women's Olympic water polo tournament goalkeepers
- List of world champions in women's water polo
- List of World Aquatics Championships medalists in water polo
