= 1999 Women's European Water Polo Championship =

Tournament details
- Host country: Italy
- Venue: 1 (in 1 host city)
- Dates: 4 – 11 September
- Teams: 8 (from 1 confederation)

Final positions
- Champions: Italy (3rd title)
- Runners-up: Netherlands
- Third place: Russia
- Fourth place: Hungary

Tournament statistics
- Top scorer: Karin Kuipers (NED) (13)

The 1999 Women's European Water Polo Championship was the eighth edition of the bi-annual event, organised by the Europe's governing body in aquatics, the Ligue Européenne de Natation. The event took place in Prato, Italy from September 4 to September 11, 1999.

== Teams ==
Group A

- Germany
- Hungary
- Russia
- Spain

Group B

- France
- Greece
- Italy
- Netherlands

== Preliminary round ==
=== Group A ===
	Team	Points	G	W	D	L	GF	GA	Diff
1.	Hungary	6	3	3	0	0	37	24	+13
2.	Russia	4	3	2	0	1	35	22	+13
3.	Spain	2	3	1	0	2	18	33	−15
4.	Germany	0	3	0	0	3	20	31	−11

- Saturday September 4, 1999

Germany	6–7	Spain
Russia	10–11	Hungary

- Sunday September 5, 1999

Russia	17–7	Spain
Hungary	16–10	Germany

- Monday September 6, 1999

Germany	4–8	Russia
Spain	4–10	Hungary

=== Group B ===
	Team	Points	G	W	D	L	GF	GA	Diff
1.	Netherlands	5	3	2	1	0	43	14	+29
2.	Italy	5	3	2	1	0	32	14	+18
3.	Greece	2	3	1	0	2	23	22	+1
4.	France	0	3	0	0	3	11	59	−48

- Saturday September 4, 1999

Greece	13–5	France
Netherlands	6–6	Italy

- Sunday September 5, 1999

Italy	19–3	France
Netherlands	10–5	Greece

- Monday September 6, 1999

France	3–27	Netherlands
Greece	5–7	Italy

== Quarterfinals ==
- Wednesday September 8, 1999

Italy	8–2	Spain
Russia	6–3	Greece

== Semifinals ==
- Thursday September 9, 1999

Netherlands	8–7	Russia
Hungary	5–6	Italy

== Finals ==
- Wednesday September 8, 1999 — Seventh place

Germany	12–6	France

- Thursday September 9, 1999 — Fifth place

Spain	4–10	Greece

- Friday September 10, 1999 — Bronze Medal

Hungary	5–7	Russia

- Friday September 10, 1999 — Gold Medal

Netherlands	9 – 10 [aet]	Italy

== Final ranking ==
RANK	TEAM
	Italy
	Netherlands
	Russia
4.	Hungary
5.	Greece
6.	Spain
7.	Germany
8.	France

1999 Women's European champion

Italy
Third title

== Individual awards ==
- Most Valuable Player
  - ???
- Best Goalkeeper
  - ???
- Best Scorer
  - Karin Kuipers (NED)

RANK	TOPSCORERS	GOALS
1.	Karin Kuipers (NED)	13
1.	Giusi Malato (ITA)	13
1.	Krisztina Szremko (HUN)	13
4.	Mercedes Stieber (HUN)	12
5.	Ingrid Leijendekker (NED)	11
6.	Yuliya Petrova (RUS)	10
7.	Daniëlle de Bruijn (NED)	9
7.	Ekaterina Vassilieva (RUS)	9
9.	Marjan op den Velde (NED)	8
9.	Dimitra Asilian (GRE)	8
9.	Stravroula Kozomboli (GRE)	8
9.	Petra Olek (GER)	8
