= Netherlands women's national water polo team =

Women's national water polo team representing the Netherlands

Netherlands
- FINA code: NED
- Association: Royal Dutch Swimming Federation
- Confederation: LEN (Europe)
- Head coach: Evangelos Doudesis
- Asst coach: Richard van Eck; Ineke Yperlaan
- Captain: Sabrina van der Sloot

FINA ranking (since 2008)
- Current: 2 (as of 1 September 2023)
- Highest: 1 (2008)

Olympic Games (team statistics)
- Appearances: 4 (first in 2000)
- Best result: (gold) (2008)

World Championship
- Appearances: 18 (first in 1986)
- Best result: (gold) (1991, 2023)

World Cup
- Appearances: 15 (first in 1979)
- Best result: (gold) (1980, 1983, 1988, 1989, 1991, 1993, 1997, 1999)

World League
- Appearances: 7 (first in 2005)
- Best result: (silver) (2018)

European Championship
- Appearances: 21 (first in 1985)
- Best result: (gold) (1985, 1987, 1988, 1993, 2018, 2024, 2026)

Media
- Website: knzb.nl

The Netherlands women's national water polo team is the national team of the Kingdom of the Netherlands. It was one of the leading teams in the world during the 1980s and 1990s. More recently they are one of the top teams again claiming the gold medal at the 2008 Beijing Olympics, the 2023 World Championships and the 2024 European Championships. The team is governed by the Koninklijke Nederlandse Zwembond (KNZB).

== Results ==
=== Medal count ===
Competition	1st place, gold medalist(s)	2nd place, silver medalist(s)	3rd place, bronze medalist(s)	Total
Olympic Games	1	0	1	2
World Championship	2	4	1	7
World League	0	1	1	2
World Cup	8	4	1	13
European Championship	7	4	3	14
Europa Cup	1	0	0	1
Total	19	13	7	39

=== Olympic Games ===
Year	Position	Pld	W	D*	L	GF	GA	Squad
(Australia) 2000	4th place	7	3	0	4	35	36	Squad
(Greece) 2004	did not qualify							
(China) 2008	Gold medal	6	3	1	2	52	50	Squad
(United Kingdom) 2012	did not qualify							
(Brazil) 2016	did not qualify							
(Japan) 2020	6th place	7	4	0	3	117	75	Squad
(France) 2024	Bronze medal	7	5	2	0	88	69	Squad
Total	1 title	27	15	3	9	292	230	-–

=== World Championship ===
Year	Position	Pld	W	D*	L	GF	GA	Squad
(Spain) 1986	Silver medal	9	7	0	2	111	49	Squad
(Australia) 1991	Gold medal	7	6	0	1	71	47	Squad
(Italy) 1994	Silver medal	7	5	0	2	73	39	Squad
(Australia) 1998	Silver medal	8	7	0	1	71	33	Squad
(Japan) 2001	9th place	5	1	0	4	21	34	Squad
(Spain) 2003	6th place	6	3	2	1	63	34	Squad
(Canada) 2005	10th place	6	2	0	4	33	43	Squad
(Australia) 2007	9th place	6	3	0	3	52	47	Squad
(Italy) 2009	5th place	7	5	1	1	72	64	Squad
(China) 2011	7th place	7	3	2	2	70	56	Squad
(Spain) 2013	7th place	7	3	1	3	95	71	Squad
(Russia) 2015	Silver medal	7	4	1	2	78	38	Squad
(Hungary) 2017	9th place	6	4	0	2	78	42	Squad
(South Korea) 2019	7th place	7	4	0	3	86	53	Squad
(Hungary) 2022	Bronze medal	7	5	0	2	99	50	Squad
(Japan) 2023	Gold medal	6	5	1	0	98	47	Squad
(Qatar) 2024	5th place	7	5	1	1	106	54	Squad
(Singapore) 2025	5th place	7	5	1	1	101	68	Squad
Total	1 Title	122	77	10	35	1278	869	

=== World Cup ===
Year	Position	Pld	W	D*	L	GF	GA
(United States) 1979	Silver medal	4	2	1	1	27	18
(Netherlands) 1980	Gold medal	4	3	1	0	31	17
(Australia) 1981	Silver medal						
(Canada) 1983	Gold medal	6	4	1	1	59	49
(United States) 1984	Bronze medal						
(New Zealand) 1988	Gold medal						
(Netherlands) 1989	Gold medal						
(United States) 1991	Gold medal						
(Italy) 1993	Gold medal						
(Australia) 1995	Silver medal						
(France) 1997	Gold medal						
(Canada) 1999	Gold medal	5	4	0	1	43	32
(Australia) 2002	did not participate						
(China) 2006	did not participate						
(New Zealand) 2010	did not participate						
(Russia) 2014	did not participate						
(Russia) 2018	did not participate						
(United States) 2023	Silver medal	3	2	0	1	38	25
(China) 2025	Bronze medal	9	7	0	2	121	94
(Australia) 2026	5th	3	2	0	1	32	27
Total	8 titles						

=== World League ===
Year	Position	Pld	W	D*	L	GF	GA
(United States) 2004	did not participate						
(Russia) 2005	7th	14	5	0	9	103	124
(Italy) 2006	5th	16	6	0	10	148	156
(United States) 2010	7th	3	1	0	2	25	31
(China) 2015	Bronze medal	12	8	0	4	151	93
(China) 2017	5th	10	6	0	4	99	79
(China) 2018	Silver medal	12	8	0	4	113	92
(Hungary) 2019	4th	15	9	0	6	164	122
(Spain) 2022	4th	10	5	0	5	117	104

=== European Championship ===
Year	Position	Pld	W	D*	L	GF	GA
(Norway) 1985	Gold medal						
(France) 1987	Gold medal						
(West Germany) 1989	Gold medal						
(Greece) 1991	Silver medal						
(United Kingdom) 1993	Gold medal						
(Austria) 1995	Bronze medal	7	5	1	1	76	42
(Spain) 1997	Bronze medal	7	6	0	1	106	37
(Italy) 1999	Silver medal	5	3	1	1	60	31
(Hungary) 2001	5th place	5	3	1	1	44	36
(Slovenia) 2003	4th place	6	3	0	3	60	36
(Serbia) 2006	5th place	5	2	0	3	56	57
(Spain) 2008	5th place	5	2	1	2	44	43
(Croatia) 2010	Bronze medal	5	3	0	2	54	48
(Netherlands) 2012	6th place	5	1	0	4	55	54
(Hungary) 2014	Silver medal	5	4	0	1	49	44
(Serbia) 2016	Silver medal	8	7	0	1	133	54
(Spain) 2018	Gold medal	8	7	1	0	111	33
(Hungary) 2020	4th place	8	6	0	2	123	40
(Croatia) 2022	4th place	8	6	0	2	147	50
(Netherlands) 2024	Gold medal	6	6	0	0	93	46
(Portugal) 2026	Gold medal	7	5	2	0	101	43
Total	7 titles	100	69	7	24	1312	694

=== LEN Europa Cup ===
Year	Position
(Spain) 2018	4th place
(Italy) 2019	Gold medal

=== Holiday Cup ===
- 1999 – 5th place
- 2000 – 4th place
- 2003 – 5th place
- 2006 – 5th place
- 2007 – 2nd place

=== World Games ===
- 1981 – 1st place

== Team ==
=== Current squad ===
Roster for the 2025 World Championships.

Head coach: Evangelos Doudesis

- 1 Sarah Buis GK
- 2 Marit van der Weijden FP
- 3 Simone van de Kraats FP
- 4 Sabrina van der Sloot FP
- 5 Maartje Keuning FP
- 6 Fleurien Bosveld FP
- 7 Bente Rogge FP
- 8 Vivian Sevenich FP
- 9 Kitty-Lynn Joustra FP
- 10 Lieke Rogge FP
- 11 Maxine Schaap FP
- 12 Nina ten Broek FP
- 13 Britt van den Dobbelsteen GK
- 14 Noa de Vries FP
- 15 Pien Gorter FP

=== Past squads ===
- 1980 FINA World Cup – Gold Medal

- Marijke Zwart (goal), Rita Heemskerk, Brigitte Hulscher, Ria Roos, Ingrid Scholten, Elly Spijker, Ank van Beek, Lieneke van den Heuvel, Greet van den Veen, Marga van Feggelen, and Hermine Perik (goal)

- 1983 FINA World Cup – Gold Medal

- Hermine Perik (goal), Marion van der Mark (goal), Anita Bibo, J Boer, H van Heemstra, Janet Heijnert, D Heijnert, K Sterkenburg, Ria Roos, Ingrid Scholten, Elly Spijker, Ank van Beek, and Greet van den Veen.

- 1985 European Championship – Gold Medal

- Madeline van Heemstra (goal), Marion van der Mark (goal), Janet Heijnert, Ineke Pesman, Belinda Hibbel, Lieneke van den Heuvel, Anita Bibo, Alice Lindhout, Monique Kranenburg, Patricia Libregts, Lillian Ossendrijver, Hedda Verdam, and Marian Walthie. Head Coach: Peter van den Biggelaar.

- 1986 World Championship – Silver Medal

- Madeline van Heemstra (goal), Hellen Boering (goal), Anita Bibo, Lieneke van den Heuvel, Marjo van der Mark, Janet Heijnert, Monique Kranenburg, Patricia Libregts, Alice Lindhout, Ineke Pesman, Janny Spijker, Greet van den Veen, and Hedda Verdam. Head Coach: Peter van den Biggelaar.

- 1987 European Championship – Gold Medal

- Madeline van Heemstra (goal), Hellen Boering (goal), Irma Brander, Lieneke van den Heuvel, Anita Bibo, Lillian Ossendrijver, Greet van den Veen, Monique Kranenburg, Patricia Libregts, Esmeralda van den Water, Ilse Sindorf, Janny Spijker, Anita Nijenhuis, and Hedda Verdam. Head Coach: Peter van den Biggelaar.

- 1988 FINA World Cup – Gold Medal

- Hermine Perik (goal), Hellen Boering (goal), Anita Bibo, Irma Brander, Monique Kranenburg, Patricia Libregts, Alice Lindhout, Anita Nijenhuis, Lillian Ossendrijver, Janny Spijker, Lieneke van den Heuvel, Greet van den Veen, and Hedda Verdam. Head Coach: Peter van den Biggelaar.

- 1989 European Championship – Gold Medal

- Hermine Perik (goal), Hellen Boering (goal), Irma Brander, Lieneke van den Heuvel, Monique Kranenburg, Alice Lindhout, Astrid van den Meer, Anita Nijenhuis, Ilse Sindorf, Janny Spijker, Greet van den Veen, Esmeralda van den Water, Patricia Libregts, and Hedda Verdam. Head Coach: Peter van den Biggelaar.

- 1989 FINA World Cup – Gold Medal

- Hermine Perik (goal), Hellen Boering (goal), Irma Brander, Lieneke van den Heuvel, Monique Kranenburg, Alice Lindhout, Patricia Libregts, Anita Nijenhuis, Ilse Sindorf, Janny Spijker, Astrid van der Meer, Greet van den Veen, Hedda Verdam, and Esmeralda van den Water. Head Coach: Peter van den Biggelaar.

- 1991 World Championship – Gold Medal

- Karla van der Boon (goal), Hellen Boering (goal), Irma Brander, Edmée Hiemstra, Monique Kranenburg, Karin Kuipers, Patricia Libregts, Alice Lindhout, Lillian Ossendrijver, Janny Spijker, Esmeralda van den Water, Marjan op den Velde, and Hedda Verdam. Head Coach: Peter van den Biggelaar.

- 1991 European Championship – Silver Medal

- Karla van der Boon (goal), Hellen Boering (goal), Edmée Hiemstra, Janny Spijker, Monique Kranenburg, Angelique Beijaard, Alice Lindhout, Karin Kuipers, Esmeralda van den Water, Patricia Libregts, Rianne Schram, Marjan op den Velde, Sandra Scherrenburg, and Hedda Verdam. Head Coach: Kees van Hardeveld.

- 1991 FINA World Cup – Gold Medal

- Karla van der Boon (goal), Hellen Boering (goal), Angelique Beijaard, Edmée Hiemstra, Monique Kranenburg, Karin Kuipers, Patricia Libregts, Alice Lindhout, Marjan op den Velde, Lillian Ossendrijver, Rianne Schram, Janny Spijker, Esmeralda van den Water, and Hedda Verdam. Head Coach: Kees van Hardeveld.

- 1993 European Championship – Gold Medal

- Karla van der Boon (goal), Hellen Boering (goal), Ellen Bast, Gillian van den Berg, Edmée Hiemstra, Karin Kuipers, Ingrid Leijendekker, Alice Lindhout, Carla Quint, Sandra Scherrenburg, Rianne Schram, Janny Spijker, and Hedda Verdam. Head Coach: Kees van Hardeveld.

- 1993 FINA World Cup – Gold Medal

- Karla van der Boon (goal), Hellen Boering (goal), Ellen Bast, Gillian van den Berg, Edmée Hiemstra, Karin Kuipers, Ingrid Leijendekker, Alice Lindhout, Sandra Scherrenburg, Carla Quint, Rianne Schram, Janny Spijker, and Hedda Verdam. Head Coach: Kees van Hardeveld.

- 1994 World Championship – Silver Medal

- Karla van der Boon (goal), Hellen Boering (goal), Ellen Bast, Gillian van den Berg, Edmée Hiemstra, Stella Kriekaard, Karin Kuipers, Ingrid Leijendekker, Alice Lindhout, Sandra Scherrenburg, Rianne Schram, Janny Spijker, and Hedda Verdam. Head Coach: Kees van Hardeveld.

- 1995 European Championship – Bronze Medal

- Karla van der Boon (goal), Karin Bouwens (goal), Ellen Bast, Gillian van den Berg, Suzanne van der Boomen, Edmée Hiemstra, Karin Kuipers, Ingrid Leijendekker, Sandra Scherrenburg, Carla Quint, Rianne Schram, Marjan op den Velde, and Hedda Verdam. Head Coach: Kees van Hardeveld.

- 1996 Olympic Year Tournament – Gold Medal

- Karla van der Boon (goal), Ellen Bast, Gillian van den Berg, Edmée Hiemstra, Erica Hoskens, Leontine Koops, Karin Kuipers, Ingrid Leijendekker, Petra Meerdink, Marjan op den Velde, Mirjam Overdam, Carla Quint, and Mariëlle Schothans. Head Coach: Kees van Hardeveld.

- 1997 FINA World Cup – Gold Medal

- Karla van der Boon (goal), Carla van Usen (goal), Ellen Bast, Gillian van den Berg, Edmée Hiemstra, Karin Kuipers, Ingrid Leijendekker, Sandra Scherrenburg, Marjan op den Velde, Mirjam Overdam, Carla Quint, Mariëlle Schothans, and Suzanne van den Boomen. Head Coach: Kees van Hardeveld.

- 1997 European Championship – Bronze Medal

- Karla van der Boon (goal), Carla van Usen (goal), Edmée Hiemstra, Ingrid Leijendekker, Marjan op den Velde, Ellen Bast, Daniëlle de Bruijn, Petra Meerdink, Gillian van den Berg, Mirjam Overdam, Karin Kuipers, Mariëlle Schothans, Sandra Scherrenburg, and Carla Quint. Head Coach: Kees van Hardeveld.

- 1998 World Championship – Silver Medal

- Karla van der Boon (goal), Carla van Usen (goal), Ellen Bast, Gillian van den Berg, Daniëlle de Bruijn, Edmée Hiemstra, Karin Kuipers, Ingrid Leijendekker, Petra Meerdink, Carla Quint, Sandra Scherrenburg, Mariëlle Schothans, and Marjan op den Velde. Head Coach: Kees van Hardeveld.

- 1999 FINA World Cup – Gold Medal

- Karla van der Boon (goal), Hellen Boering (goal), Ellen Bast, Gillian van den Berg, Daniëlle de Bruijn, Edmée Hiemstra, Mariëtte Koehorst, Karin Kuipers, Ingrid Leijendekker, Patricia Libregts, Marjan op den Velde, Mirjam Overdam, and Carla Quint. Head Coach: Kees van Hardeveld.

- 1999 European Championship – Silver Medal

- Karla van der Boon (goal), Hellen Boering (goal), Ellen Bast, Gillian van den Berg, Daniëlle de Bruijn, Edmée Hiemstra, Karin Kuipers, Ingrid Leijendekker, Patricia Libregts, Jorieke Oostendorp, Marjan op den Velde, Mirjam Overdam, and Carla Quint. Head Coach: Jan Mensink.

== Under-20 team ==
The Netherlands lastly competed at the 2021 FINA Junior Water Polo World Championships.

== See also ==
- Netherlands women's Olympic water polo team records and statistics
- Netherlands men's national water polo team
- List of Olympic champions in women's water polo
- List of women's Olympic water polo tournament records and statistics
- List of world champions in women's water polo
