= Edmée Hiemstra =

Dutch water polo player (born 1970)

Personal information
- Full name: Edmée Winnifred Hiemstra
- Born: 22 June 1970 (age 56) Baarn, Netherlands
- Height: 1.72 m (5 ft 8 in)
- Weight: 69 kg (152 lb; 10 st 12 lb)
Medal record
Representing Netherlands
World Championships
Gold medal – first place	1991 Perth	Team competition
Silver medal – second place	1994 Rome	Team competition
Silver medal – second place	1998 Perth	Team competition
European Championships
Gold medal – first place	1993 Sheffield	Team competition
Silver medal – second place	1991 Athens	Team competition
Silver medal – second place	1999 Prato	Team competition
Bronze medal – third place	1995 Vienna	Team competition
Bronze medal – third place	1997 Seville	Team competition

Edmée Winnifred Hiemstra (born 22 June 1970) is a retired water polo player from Netherlands. She participated in the 2000 Summer Olympics with Netherlands women's national water polo team, finishing in fourth place.

== See also ==
- List of world champions in women's water polo
- List of World Aquatics Championships medalists in water polo
