= Daniela Passoni =

South African water polo player

Personal information
- Nationality: South African
- Height: 5 ft 9 in (1.75 m)

Sport
- Sport: Water polo
- Position: Goalkeeper

Daniela Passoni is a South African water polo player, who is a member of the South Africa women's national water polo team. She will be part of the team in the women's water polo tournament at the delayed 2020 Summer Olympics.

She participated at the 2018 FINA Women's Water Polo World Cup, and 2019 FINA World Women's Junior Waterpolo Championships.

She played for California State University, East Bay.
