= Meghan Maartens =

South African water polo player

Personal information
- Nationality: South African
- Born: 8 April 1999 (age 27)

Sport
- Sport: Water polo
- Position: Goalkeeper

Meghan Maartens is a South African water polo player, who is a member of the South Africa women's national water polo team. She was part of the team in the women's water polo tournament at the 2020 Summer Olympics.

She participated in the 2017 U-17 Women's Water Polo European Nations Cup.
