= France women's national water polo team =

Women's national water polo team representing France

France
- FINA code: FRA
- Association: Fédération Française de Natation
- Confederation: LEN (Europe)
- Head coach: Lucas Heurtier
- Asst coach: Thibaut Simon
- Captain: Lara Andres

FINA ranking (since 2008)
- Current: 12 (as of 9 August 2021)

Olympic Games
- Appearances: 1 (first in 2024)
- Best result: 9th place (2024)

World Championship
- Appearances: 9 (first in 1991)
- Best result: 8th place (2022)

European Championship
- Appearances: 17 (first in 1985)
- Best result: (bronze) (1987, 1989)

Media
- Website: ffnatation.fr

The France women's water polo team is a water polo team that represents France at water polo competitions.

== Results ==
=== Olympic Games ===
- 2024 – 9th place

=== World Championship ===
- 1991 – 9th place
- 1994 – 9th place
- 2003 – 15th place
- 2015 – 14th place
- 2017 – 11th place
- 2022 – 8th place
- 2023 – 9th place
- 2024 – 13th place
- 2025 – 12th place

=== European Championship ===
- 1985 – 7th place
- 1987 – 3rd place
- 1989 – 3rd place
- 1991 – 4th place
- 1993 – 5th place
- 1995 – 5th place
- 1997 – 8th place
- 1999 – 8th place
- 2001 – 8th place
- 2008 – 8th place
- 2014 – 7th place
- 2016 – 7th place
- 2018 – 7th place
- 2020 – 7th place
- 2022 – 7th place
- 2024 – 6th place
- 2026 – 8th place

== Current squad ==
Roster for the 2025 World Championships.

Head coach: Lucas Heurtier

- 1 Pasiphaé Martineaud Peret GK
- 2 Lara Andres FP
- 3 Jade Boughrara FP
- 4 Elhyne Kilic-Pegourie FP
- 5 Erica Hardy FP
- 6 Lily Vernoux FP
- 7 Emma Duflos FP
- 8 Valentine Heurtaux FP
- 9 Ema Vernoux FP
- 10 Lou Jean-Michel FP
- 11 Tiziana Raspo FP
- 12 Camille Radosavljevic FP
- 13 Eszter Lefebvre GK
- 14 Arianna Banchi FP
- 15 Myriam Ouchache FP

== Under-20 team ==
France lastly competed at the 2021 FINA Junior Water Polo World Championships.
