= Nicola Macleod =

South African water polo player

Personal information
- Nationality: South African
- Born: 14 May 1997 (age 27); Johannesburg, South Africa

Sport
- Country: South Africa
- Sport: Water polo

Nicola Macleod (born 14 May 1997) is a South African water polo player. She competed in the 2020 Summer Olympics.
