= Clara Vulpisi =

Canadian water polo player (born 1998)

Personal information
- Born: July 15, 1998 (age 27) Craiova, Romania
- Height: 1.72 m (5 ft 8 in)
- Weight: 77 kg (170 lb)

Sport
- Country: Canada
- Sport: Water polo
- Club: Club Aquatique Water-polo Montréal
Medal record
Women's water polo
Representing Canada
Pan American Games
Silver medal – second place	2023 Santiago	Team

Clara Vulpisi (born July 15, 1998 in Craiova, Romania) is a Canadian water polo player from Montreal. She is a member of the Canada women's national water polo team. She will participate in the 2020 Summer Olympics.

== Career ==
She participated at the 2017 FINA Women's Water Polo World League, 2018 FINA Women's Water Polo World League, and 2017 Universiade.

She played for Mariano Marcos State University, and University of the Pacific.

In June 2021, Vulpisi was named to Canada's 2020 Summer Olympics team as an alternate.

== Coaching ==
She was hired by the UC Santa Barbara Gauchos to serve as their women's water polo goalkeeping coach in August 2024.
