= Evangelos Doudesis =

Greek water polo coach

Evangelos Doudesis (Athens, 12 March 1985) is a Greek water polo coach and former player, best known as the head coach of the Netherlands women's national water polo team.

== Early life ==
Doudesis was born in Athens. He moved to the Netherlands in 2013 to study sport management and played water polo for Polar Bears in Ede.

== Coaching career ==
After ending his playing career, Doudesis became head coach of the Polar Bears women's team, leading them to Dutch national titles in 2018 and 2021. In 2017, he joined the Royal Dutch Swimming Federation (KNZB) as assistant coach of the Netherlands women's national team and head coach of the under-20 squad. During this period, the senior team won the gold medal at the 2018 European Championship.

Doudesis was appointed head coach of the Netherlands women's national team in September 2021, succeeding Arno Havenga. Under his leadership, the Netherlands achieved major international success, including winning the gold medal at the 2023 World Aquatics Championships and the European Championship title in 2024. His contract with the Dutch federation was extended until the 2028 Olympic Games.

== Achievements ==
- 2018: Gold – Dutch national champion with Polar Bears
- 2018: Gold – European Championship (as assistant national coach)
- 2019: Gold – KNZB Cup with Polar Bears
- 2021: 6th place – Olympic Games (as assistant national coach)
- 2022: Bronze – World Championship
- 2022: 4th place – European Championship
- 2022: 4th place – World League
- 2023: Silver – World Cup
- 2023: Gold – World Championship
- 2024: Gold – European Championship
- 2024: Bronze – Olympic Games
- 2026: Gold – European Championship
