= 1997 Women's European Water Polo Championship =

Tournament details
- Host country: Spain
- Venue(s): 1 (in 1 host city)
- Dates: 13 – 22 August
- Teams: 12 (from 1 confederation)

Final positions
- Champions: Italy (2nd title)
- Runner-up: Russia
- Third place: Netherlands
- Fourth place: Spain

The 1997 Women's European Water Polo Championship was the seventh edition of the European Water Polo Championship, organised by the Ligue Européenne de Natation. The event took place in Seville, Spain from August 13 to August 22, 1997, part of the European LC Championships 1997.

== Teams ==
Group A

- Czech Republic
- France
- Germany
- Greece
- Hungary
- Yugoslavia

Group B

- Great Britain
- Italy
- Netherlands
- Portugal
- Russia
- Spain

== Preliminary round ==
=== Group A ===
	Team	Points	G	W	D	L	GF	GA	Diff
1.	Greece	10	5	5	0	0	43	19	+24
2.	Hungary	8	5	4	0	1	70	14	+56
3.	Germany	6	5	3	0	2	30	31	−1
4.	France	4	5	2	0	3	34	41	−7
5.	Yugoslavia	2	5	1	0	4	24	50	−26
6.	Czech Republic	0	5	0	0	5	25	71	−46

- August 13, 1997

Yugoslavia	5–8	Germany
France	2–13	Hungary
Greece	12–2	Czech Republic

- August 14, 1997

Hungary	6–7	Greece
Germany	8–4	Czech Republic
Yugoslavia	5–9	France

- August 15, 1997

Greece	8–2	Yugoslavia
Czech Republic	2–26	Hungary
France	5–7	Germany

- August 16, 1997

Germany	2–10	Hungary
France	4–9	Greece
Yugoslavia	11–10	Czech Republic

- August 17, 1997

Czech Republic	7–14	France
Greece	7–5	Germany
Yugoslavia	1–15	Hungary

=== Group B ===
	Team	Points	G	W	D	L	GF	GA	Diff
1.	Netherlands	10	5	5	0	0	76	22	+54
2.	Russia	7	5	3	1	1	49	25	+24
3.	Italy	7	5	3	1	1	51	28	+23
4.	Spain	4	5	2	0	3	29	30	−1
5.	Great Britain	2	5	1	0	4	25	64	−39
6.	Portugal	0	5	0	0	5	14	75	−61

- August 13, 1997

Russia	16–5	Portugal
Spain	5–6	Italy
Great Britain	3–21	Netherlands

- August 14, 1997

Italy	17–0	Portugal
Netherlands	12–6	Russia
Spain	10–4	Great Britain

- August 15, 1997

Netherlands	22–2	Portugal
Great Britain	7–14	Italy
Russia	8–1	Spain

- August 16, 1997

Great Britain	1–13	Russia
Italy	8–10	Netherlands
Spain	10–1	Portugal

- August 17, 1997

Italy	6–6	Russia
Spain	3–11	Netherlands
Portugal	6–10	Great Britain

== Quarterfinals ==
- August 19, 1997

Netherlands	13–2	France
Russia	9–5	Germany
Italy	8–7	Hungary
Spain	7 – 6 [aet]	Greece

== Play-Offs ==
- August 20, 1997

Germany	10 – 9 [aet]	Greece
Hungary	13–2	France

== Semifinals ==
- August 20, 1997

Netherlands	7 – 8 [aet]	Italy
Russia	11–6	Spain

== Finals ==
- August 22, 1997 — Ninth place

Yugoslavia	5–4	Great Britain

- August 22, 1997 — Seventh place

Greece	9–6	France

- August 22, 1997 — Fifth place

Hungary	10–5	Germany

- August 22, 1997 — Bronze Medal

Netherlands	10–5	Spain

- August 22, 1997 — Gold Medal

Italy	7–6	Russia

== Final ranking ==
RANK	TEAM
	Italy
	Russia
	Netherlands
4.	Spain
5.	Hungary
6.	Germany
7.	Greece
8.	France
9.	Yugoslavia
10.	Great Britain
11.	Portugal
12.	Czech Republic

1997 Women's European champion

Italy
Second title

== Individual awards ==
- Most Valuable Player
  - ???
- Best Goalkeeper
  - ???
- Topscorer
  - ???
