= 1999 FINA Women's Water Polo World Cup =

- Website: FINA event site

The 1999 FINA Women's Water Polo World Cup was the twelfth edition of the event, organised by the International Swimming Federation (FINA). The event took place in Winnipeg, Manitoba, Canada from May 24 to May 29, 1999. Participating teams were the eight leading teams from the World Championships. The tournament served as a qualifier for the 2000 Summer Olympics in Sydney, Australia. Automatically the first ranked teams from Europe and the Americas, plus one team from the host country, qualified. Other teams could qualify at the 2000 Olympic Games Qualifying Tournament, held from April 22 to April 30 in Palermo, Italy.

== Teams ==
GROUP A

- Greece
- Hungary
- Italy
- Russia

GROUP B

- Australia
- Canada
- Netherlands
- United States

== Preliminary round ==
=== GROUP A ===
	Team	Points	G	W	D	L	GF	GA	Diff
1.	Italy	4	3	1	2	0	17	7	+10
2.	Hungary	4	3	1	2	0	13	12	+1
3.	Russia	3	3	1	1	1	19	17	+2
4.	Greece	1	3	0	1	2	9	22	–13

- May 24, 1999

Hungary	1 – 1	Italy
Greece	4 – 7	Russia

- May 25, 1999

Hungary	8 – 7	Russia
Greece	1 – 11	Italy

- May 26, 1999

Italy	5 – 5	Russia
Hungary	4 – 4	Greece

=== GROUP B ===
	Team	Points	G	W	D	L	GF	GA	Diff
1.	Australia	5	3	2	1	0	21	17	+4
2.	Netherlands	4	3	2	0	1	29	22	+7
3.	United States	3	3	1	1	1	18	20	–2
4.	Canada	0	3	0	0	3	18	27	–9

- May 24, 1999

United States	4 – 4	Australia
Netherlands	12 – 6	Canada

- May 25, 1999

Netherlands	6 – 8	Australia
United States	6 – 5	Canada

- May 26, 1999

United States	8 – 11	Netherlands
Australia	9 – 7	Canada

== Semifinals ==
- May 28, 1999

Russia	6 – 8	Canada
United States	9 – 7	Greece

Italy	4 – 7	Netherlands
Australia	6 – 3	Hungary

== Finals ==
- May 29, 1999 — Seventh place

Russia	13 – 4	Greece

- May 29, 1999 — Fifth place

Canada	6 – 4	United States

- May 29, 1999 — Bronze Medal

Italy	6 – 5 [aet]	Hungary

- May 29, 1999 — Gold Medal

Netherlands	7 – 6	Australia

== Final ranking ==
RANK	TEAM
	Netherlands
	Australia
	Italy
4.	Hungary
5.	Canada
6.	United States
7.	Russia
8.	Greece

1999 Women's FINA World Cup winners

Netherlands
Eighth title

*The Netherlands and Canada qualified for the 2000 Summer Olympics in Sydney, Australia

== Individual awards ==
- Most Valuable Player
  - Ingrid Leijendekker (NED)
- Best Goalkeeper
  - ???

RANK	TOPSCORERS	GOALS
1.	Marjan op den Velde (NED)	10
2.	Yuliya Petrova (RUS)	9
3.	Ingrid Leijendekker (NED)	8
4.	Karin Kuipers (NED)	6
4.	Gillian van den Berg (NED)	6
