= European Water Polo Championship =

International water polo tournament

- Sport: Water polo
- Founded: 1926
- Continent: Europe (LEN)
- Most recent champions: Serbia (men's, 9th title); Netherlands (women's, 7th title)
- Most titles: Hungary (men's, 13 titles); Netherlands (women's, 7 titles)

The European Water Polo Championship is a sport competition for national water polo teams, currently held biannually and organized by the European Aquatics, the European governing body for aquatic sports. There are both men's and women's competitions.

The first European Water Polo Championship was held in 1926 in Budapest, Hungary, with just a men's competition. The women for the first time competed in 1985 (Oslo, Norway) for the European title. The water polo tournament was part of the European Aquatics Championships up to and including 1997, and from 1999 the event was separated and got its own independent tournament.

== Men's tournament ==
=== Results ===
MEN'S EUROPEAN WATER POLO CHAMPIONSHIP
#	Year	Host	Gold	Silver	Bronze	Teams
Part of the European Aquatics Championships
1	1926; Details	Budapest, Hungary	Hungary	Sweden	Germany	4
2	1927; Details	Bologna, Italy	Hungary	France	Belgium	12
3	1931; Details	Paris, France	Hungary	Germany	Austria	7
4	1934; Details	Magdeburg, Germany	Hungary	Germany	Belgium	10
5	1938; Details	(United Kingdom); London, Great Britain	Hungary	Germany	Netherlands	7
6	1947; Details	Monte Carlo, Monaco	Italy	Sweden	Belgium	10
7	1950; Details	Vienna, Austria	Netherlands	Sweden	Yugoslavia	7
8	1954; Details	Turin, Italy	Hungary	Yugoslavia	Italy	12
9	1958; Details	Budapest, Hungary	Hungary	Yugoslavia	Soviet Union	14
10	1962; Details	Leipzig, East Germany	Hungary	Soviet Union Yugoslavia	—	11
11	1966; Details	Utrecht, Netherlands	Soviet Union	East Germany	Yugoslavia	17
12	1970; Details	Barcelona, Spain	Soviet Union	Hungary	Yugoslavia	15
13	1974; Details	Vienna, Austria	Hungary	Soviet Union	Yugoslavia	8
14	1977; Details	Jönköping, Sweden	Hungary	Yugoslavia	Italy	8
15	1981; Details	(Socialist Federal Republic of Yugoslavia); Split, Yugoslavia	West Germany	Soviet Union	Hungary	8
16	1983; Details	Rome, Italy	Soviet Union	Hungary	Spain	8
17	1985; Details	Sofia, Bulgaria	Soviet Union	Yugoslavia	West Germany	8
18	1987; Details	Strasbourg, France	Soviet Union	Yugoslavia	Italy	8
19	1989; Details	Bonn, West Germany	West Germany	Yugoslavia	Italy	16
20	1991; Details	Athens, Greece	Yugoslavia	Spain	Soviet Union	16
21	1993; Details	(United Kingdom); Sheffield, Great Britain	Italy	Hungary	Spain	12
22	1995; Details	Vienna, Austria	Italy	Hungary	Germany	12
23	1997; Details	Seville, Spain	Hungary	FR Yugoslavia	Russia	12
Separate from the European Aquatics Championships
24	1999; Details	Florence, Italy	Hungary	Croatia	Italy	12
25	2001; Details	Budapest, Hungary	FR Yugoslavia	Italy	Hungary	12
26	2003; Details	Kranj, Slovenia	Serbia and Montenegro	Croatia	Hungary	12
27	2006; Details	Belgrade, Serbia	Serbia	Hungary	Spain	12
28	2008; Details	Málaga, Spain	Montenegro	Serbia	Hungary	12
29	2010; Details	Zagreb, Croatia	Croatia	Italy	Serbia	12
30	2012; Details	Eindhoven, Netherlands	Serbia	Montenegro	Hungary	12
31	2014; Details	Budapest, Hungary	Serbia	Hungary	Italy	12
32	2016; Details	Belgrade, Serbia	Serbia	Montenegro	Hungary	16
33	2018; Details	Barcelona, Spain	Serbia	Spain	Croatia	16
34	2020; Details	Budapest, Hungary	Hungary	Spain	Montenegro	16
35	2022; Details	Split, Croatia	Croatia	Hungary	Spain	16
36	2024; Details	Dubrovnik and Zagreb, Croatia	Spain	Croatia	Italy	16
37	2026; Details	Belgrade, Serbia	Serbia	Hungary	Greece	16

=== Finishes in the top four ===
In the following table, the national teams are listed under the names they competed with, not by the succession of medals, results, or continuity of the previous republics.

Legend

- ^{†} – Defunct team

Rk	Men's team	Total	Champions	Runners-up	Third place	Fourth place	First	Last
1	Hungary	30	13 (1926, 1927, 1931, 1934, 1938, 1954, 1958, 1962, 1974, 1977, 1997, 1999, 2020)	8 (1970, 1983, 1993, 1995, 2006, 2014, 2022, 2026)	6 (1981, 2001, 2003, 2008, 2012, 2016)	3 (1947, 2010, 2024)	1926	2026
2	Italy	22	3 (1947, 1993, 1995)	2 (2001, 2010)	7 (1954, 1977, 1987, 1989, 1999, 2014, 2024)	10 (1950, 1958, 1966, 1970, 1985, 1991, 2012, 2018, 2022, 2026)	1947	2026
3	Yugoslavia^{†}	14	1 (1991)	7 (1954, 1958, 1962, 1977, 1985, 1987, 1989)	4 (1950, 1966, 1970, 1974)	2 (1981, 1983)	1950	1991
4	Soviet Union^{†}	12	5 (1966, 1970, 1983, 1985, 1987)	3 (1962, 1974, 1981)	2 (1958, 1991)	1 (1977, 1989)	1958	1991
5	Croatia	11	2 (2010, 2022)	3 (1999, 2003, 2024)	1 (2018)	5 (1995, 1997, 2001, 2008, 2020)	1995	2024
6	Serbia	8	6 (2006, 2012, 2014, 2016, 2018, 2026)	1 (2008)	1 (2010)	0	2006	2026
7	Spain	8	1 (2024)	3 (1991, 2018, 2020)	4 (1983, 1993, 2006, 2022)	0	1983	2024
8	Belgium	6	0	0	3 (1927, 1934, 1947)	3 (1926, 1931, 1938)	1926	1947
9	Montenegro	5	1 (2008)	2 (2012, 2016)	1 (2020)	1 (2014)	2008	2020
10	Germany	5	0	3 (1931, 1934, 1938)	2 (1926, 1995)	0	1926	1995
11	Sweden	5	0	3 (1926, 1947, 1950)	0	2 (1927, 1934)	1926	1950
12	West Germany^{†}	4	2 (1981, 1989)	0	1 (1985)	1 (1987)	1981	1989
13	Netherlands	4	1 (1950)	0	1 (1938)	2 (1954, 1974)	1938	1974
14	FR Yugoslavia^{†} / Serbia and Montenegro^{†}	3	2 (2001, 2003)	1 (1997)	0	0	1997	2003
15	Greece	3	0	0	1 (2026)	2 (1999, 2016)	1999	2026
16	East Germany^{†}	2	0	1 (1966)	0	1 (1962)	1962	1966
17	Russia	2	0	0	1 (1997)	1 (2003)	1997	2003
18	Romania	2	0	0	0	2 (1993, 2006)	1993	2006
19	France	1	0	1 (1927)	0	0	1927	1927
20	Austria	1	0	0	1 (1931)	0	1931	1931
Rk	Men's team	Total	Champions	Runners-up	Third place	Fourth place	First	Last

=== Medal table ===
Rank	Nation	Gold	Silver	Bronze	Total
1	Hungary	13	8	6	27
2	Serbia (Note: Yugoslavia won 1 gold, 7 silver and 4 bronze medals, Serbia and Montenegro won 2 gold medals.)	9	9	5	23
3	Russia (Note: Soviet Union won 5 gold, 3 silver and 2 bronze medals.)	5	3	3	11
4	Italy	3	2	7	12
5	Germany (Note: West Germany won 2 gold and 1 bronze medal.)	2	3	3	8
6	Croatia	2	3	1	6
7	Spain	1	3	4	8
8	Montenegro	1	2	1	4
9	Netherlands	1	0	1	2
10	Sweden	0	3	0	3
11	East Germany	0	1	0	1
11	France	0	1	0	1
13	Belgium	0	0	3	3
14	Austria	0	0	1	1
14	Greece	0	0	1	1
Totals (15 entries)		**37**	**38**	**36**	**111**

=== Participation details ===
Team	1926 (Hungary)	1927 (Italy)	1931 (France)	1934 (Germany)	1938 (United Kingdom)	1947 (Monaco)	1950 (Austria)	1954 (Italy)	1958 (Hungary)	1962 (Germany)	1966 (Netherlands)	1970 (Spain)	1974 (Austria)	1977 (Sweden)	1981 (Socialist Federal Republic of Yugoslavia)	1983 (Italy)	1985 (Bulgaria)	1987 (France)	1989 (West Germany)	1991 (Greece)	1993 (United Kingdom)	1995 (Austria)	1997 (Spain)	1999 (Italy)	2001 (Hungary)	2003 (Slovenia)	2006 (Serbia)	2008 (Spain)	2010 (Croatia)	2012 (Netherlands)	2014 (Hungary)	2016 (Serbia)	2018 (Spain)	2020 (Hungary)	2022 (Croatia)	2024 (Croatia)	2026 (Serbia)	2028	Years
Austria	•	6th	**3rd**	•	•	10th	5th	12th	11th	•	•	14th	•	•	•	•	•	•	14th	•	•	12th	•	•	•	•	•	•	•	•	•	•	•	•	•	•	•		9
Belgium	**4th**	**3rd**	**4th**	**3rd**	**4th**	**3rd**	•	11th	10th	7th	10th	12th	•	•	•	•	•	•	•	•	•	•	•	•	•	•	•	•	•	•	•	•	•	•	•	•	•		11
Bulgaria	•	•	•	•	•	•	•	•	14th	•	11th	•	•	•	•	•	•	8th	10th	13th	•	8th	11th	•	•	•	•	•	•	•	•	•	•	•	•	•	•		7
Croatia	Part of Yugoslavia																				5th	**4th**	**4th**	**2nd**	**4th**	**2nd**	7th	**4th**	**1st**	9th	5th	7th	**3rd**	**4th**	**1st**	**2nd**	6th	Q	18
Czechoslovakia	•	7th	5th	8th	•	9th	•	•	•	•	14th	•	•	•	•	•	•	•	7th	10th	Defunct																		7
Denmark	•	•	•	•	•	•	•	•	•	•	•	•	•	•	•	•	•	•	•	16th	•	•	•	•	•	•	•	•	•	•	•	•	•	•	•	•	•		1
Finland	•	•	•	•	•	•	•	•	•	•	•	13th	•	•	•	•	•	•	•	•	•	•	•	•	•	•	•	•	•	•	•	•	•	•	•	•	•		1
France	•	**2nd**	6th	6th	6th	7th	6th	9th	8th	•	13th	11th	•	•	•	•	•	•	12th	11th	•	•	•	•	12th	•	•	•	•	•	10th	9th	12th	13th	6th	9th	9th		20
Georgia	Part of Soviet Union																				•	•	•	•	•	•	•	•	•	•	12th	14th	13th	10th	8th	10th	10th		7
Germany; West Germany	**3rd**	5th	**2nd**	**2nd**	**2nd**	•	•	6th	7th	•	7th	7th	8th	6th	**1st**	5th	**3rd**	**4th**	**1st**	7th	9th	**3rd**	10th	8th	9th	6th	8th	6th	6th	5th	9th	11th	9th	9th	13th	12th	•		33
East Germany	Part of Germany							•	5th	**4th**	**2nd**	•	•	•	•	•	•	•	•	Defunct																			3
Great Britain	•	8th	•	•	7th	6th	•	8th	13th	10th	17th	•	•	•	•	•	•	•	15th	14th	12th	•	•	•	•	•	•	•	•	•	•	•	•	•	•	•	•		10
Greece	•	•	•	•	•	•	•	•	•	•	•	10th	•	•	•	•	8th	•	11th	6th	7th	9th	7th	**4th**	7th	8th	6th	11th	9th	6th	6th	**4th**	5th	7th	5th	5th	**3rd**	Q	22
Hungary	**1st**	**1st**	**1st**	**1st**	**1st**	**4th**	•	**1st**	**1st**	**1st**	5th	**2nd**	**1st**	**1st**	**3rd**	**2nd**	5th	5th	9th	5th	**2nd**	**2nd**	**1st**	**1st**	**3rd**	**3rd**	**2nd**	**3rd**	**4th**	**3rd**	**2nd**	**3rd**	8th	**1st**	**2nd**	**4th**	**2nd**	Q	37
Ireland	•	•	•	•	•	•	•	•	•	•	15th	15th	•	•	•	•	•	•	•	•	•	•	•	•	•	•	•	•	•	•	•	•	•		•	•	•	•	2
Israel	•	•	•	•	•	•	•	•	•	•	•	•	•	•	•	•	•	•	•	•	•	•	•	•	•	•	•	•	•	•	•	•	•	•	12th	16th	16th		3
Italy	•	12th	•	10th	5th	**1st**	**4th**	**3rd**	**4th**	8th	**4th**	**4th**	5th	**3rd**	6th	7th	**4th**	**3rd**	**3rd**	**4th**	**1st**	**1st**	6th	**3rd**	**2nd**	9th	5th	5th	**2nd**	**4th**	**3rd**	6th	**4th**	6th	**4th**	**3rd**	**4th**	Q	36
Malta	•	•	•	•	•	•	•	•	•	•	•	•	•	•	•	•	•	•	•	•	•	•	•	•	•	•	•	•	•	•	•	15th	16th	16th	14th	15th	13th		6
Montenegro	Part of Yugoslavia																				Part of (Serbia and Montenegro) SCG / FR Yugoslavia						• (Note: Won European B Waterpolo Championship)	**1st**	5th	**2nd**	4th	**2nd**	6th	**3rd**	7th	6th	7th	Q	11
Netherlands	•	11th	•	9th	**3rd**	5th	**1st**	**4th**	6th	6th	8th	5th	**4th**	5th	8th	6th	7th	•	8th	9th	8th	10th	9th	12th	10th	11th	10th	•	•	10th	•	12th	10th	15th	11th	11th	11th		31
North Macedonia	Part of Yugoslavia																				•	•	•	•	•	•	•	8th	12th	11th	•	•	•	•	•	•	•		3
Poland	•	•	•	•	•	•	•	•	9th	11th	•	•	•	•	•	•	•	•	13th	12th	•	•	•	•	•	•	•	•	•	•	•	•	•	•	•	•		•	4
Romania	•	•	•	•	•	•	•	10th	•	5th	6th	6th	6th	7th	7th	8th	•	7th	5th	8th	**4th**	11th	•	9th	11th	10th	**4th**	9th	7th	8th	8th	10th	11th	11th	10th	8th	8th	Q	28
Russia	Part of Soviet Union																				6th	6th	**3rd**	5th	5th	**4th**	9th	10th	11th	•	11th	8th	7th	8th	DQ	DQ	DQ		13
Serbia	Part of Yugoslavia																				Part of (Serbia and Montenegro) SCG / FRY						**1st**	**2nd**	**3rd**	**1st**	**1st**	**1st**	**1st**	5th	9th	7th	**1st**	Q	12
(Serbia and Montenegro) SCG / FRY	Part of Yugoslavia																				•	•	**2nd**	7th	**1st**	**1st**	Defunct												4
Slovakia	Part of Czechoslovakia																				10th	•	8th	10th	8th	7th	11th	12th	•	•	•	13th	14th	14th	15th	13th	14th		13
Slovenia	Part of Yugoslavia																				•	•	•	11th	•	12th	12th	•	•	•	•	•	•	•	16th	14th	15th		6
Soviet Union	•	•	•	•	•	•	•	5th	**3rd**	**2nd**	**1st**	**1st**	**2nd**	**4th**	**2nd**	**1st**	**1st**	**1st**	**4th**	**3rd**	Defunct																		13
Spain	•	10th	•	7th	•	•	•	7th	12th	•	12th	8th	7th	8th	5th	**3rd**	6th	6th	6th	**2nd**	**3rd**	5th	5th	6th	6th	5th	**3rd**	7th	8th	7th	7th	5th	**2nd**	**2nd**	**3rd**	**1st**	5th	Q	32
Sweden	**2nd**	**4th**	7th	**4th**	•	**2nd**	**2nd**	•	•	9th	9th	9th	•	•	•	•	•	•	16th	•	•	•	•	•	•	•	•	•	•	•	•	•	•	•	•	•	•		10
Switzerland	•	•	•	•	•	•	7th	•	•	•	•	•	•	•	•	•	•	•	•	•	•	•	•	•	•	•	•	•	•	•	•		•	•	•	•	•	•	1
Turkey	•	•	•	•	•	•	•	•	•	•	16th	•	•	•	•	•	•	•	•	15th	•	•	•	•	•	•	•	•	10th	12th	•	16th	15th	12th	•	•	12th		8
Ukraine	Part of Soviet Union																				11th	7th	11th	•	•	•	•	•	•	•	•	•	•	•	•	•	•		3
Yugoslavia	•	9th	•	5th	•	8th	**3rd**	**2nd**	**2nd**	**2nd**	**3rd**	**3rd**	**3rd**	**2nd**	**4th**	**4th**	**2nd**	**2nd**	**2nd**	**1st**	Defunct																		17
Total	4	12	7	10	7	10	7	12	14	11	17	15	8	8	8	8	8	8	16	16	12	12	12	12	12	12	12	12	12	12	12	16	16	16	16	16	16	16	

=== Most successful players ===
Boldface denotes active water polo players and highest medal count among all players (including these who not included in these tables) per type.

==== Multiple gold medalists ====
Rank	Player	Country	From	To	Gold	Silver	Bronze	Total
1	Filip Filipović	Serbia and Montenegro; Serbia	2003	2018	**6**	1	1	**8**
2	Slobodan Nikić	Serbia and Montenegro; Serbia	2003	2016	5	1	1	7
2	Duško Pijetlović	Serbia	2006	2018	5	1	1	7
2	Andrija Prlainović	Serbia	2006	2018	5	1	1	7
5	Živko Gocić	Serbia and Montenegro; Serbia	2003	2016	5	–	1	6
6	**Miloš Ćuk**	Serbia	2012	2026	5	–	–	5
7	Milan Aleksić	Serbia	2010	2018	4	–	1	5
7	Stefan Mitrović	Serbia	2010	2018	4	–	1	5
9	**Dušan Mandić**	Serbia	2014	2026	4	–	–	4
9	Márton Homonnai	Hungary	1926	1934	4	–	–	4
9	Alajos Keserű	Hungary	1926	1934	4	–	–	4
9	Branislav Mitrović	Serbia	2012	2018	4	–	–	4
9	József Vértesy	Hungary	1926	1934	4	–	–	4

==== Multiple medalists ====
The table shows players who have won at least 6 medals in total at the European Championships.

Rank	Player	Country	From	To	Gold	Silver	Bronze	Total
1	Filip Filipović	Serbia and Montenegro; Serbia	2003	2018	**6**	1	1	**8**
2	Tamás Kásás	Hungary	1995	2012	2	2	**4**	**8**
3	Slobodan Nikić	Serbia and Montenegro; Serbia	2003	2016	5	1	1	7
3	**Duško Pijetlović**	Serbia	2006	2018	5	1	1	7
3	**Andrija Prlainović**	Serbia	2006	2018	5	1	1	7
6	Rajmund Fodor	Hungary	1993	2006	2	3	2	7
7	Gergely Kiss	Hungary	1997	2012	2	1	**4**	7
8	Živko Gocić	Serbia and Montenegro; Serbia	2003	2016	5	–	1	6
9	Tamás Molnár	Hungary	1997	2008	2	1	3	6
10	Tibor Benedek	Hungary	1993	2008	1	2	3	6
10	Norbert Hosnyánszky	Hungary	2006	2020	1	2	3	6
10	**Dénes Varga**	Hungary	2006	2020	1	2	3	6
13	Péter Biros	Hungary	1999	2012	1	1	**4**	6

== Women's tournament ==
=== Results ===
WOMEN'S EUROPEAN WATER POLO CHAMPIONSHIP
#	Year	Host	Gold	Silver	Bronze	Teams
Part of the European Aquatics Championships
1	**1985**; Details	Oslo, Norway	Netherlands	Hungary	West Germany	8
2	**1987**; Details	Strasbourg, France	Netherlands	Hungary	France	7
3	**1989**; Details	Bonn, West Germany	Netherlands	Hungary	France	9
4	**1991**; Details	Athens, Greece	Hungary	Netherlands	Italy	8
5	**1993**; Details	(United Kingdom); Leeds, Great Britain	Netherlands	Russia	Hungary	12
6	**1995**; Details	Vienna, Austria	Italy	Hungary	Netherlands	12
7	**1997**; Details	Sevilla, Spain	Italy	Russia	Netherlands	12
Separate from the European Aquatics Championships
8	**1999**; Details	Prato, Italy	Italy	Netherlands	Russia	8
9	**2001**; Details	Budapest, Hungary	Hungary	Italy	Russia	8
10	**2003**; Details	Ljubljana, Slovenia	Italy	Hungary	Russia	8
11	**2006**; Details	Belgrade, Serbia	Russia	Italy	Hungary	8
12	**2008**; Details	Málaga, Spain	Russia	Spain	Hungary	8
13	**2010**; Details	Zagreb, Croatia	Russia	Greece	Netherlands	8
14	**2012**; Details	Eindhoven, Netherlands	Italy	Greece	Hungary	8
15	**2014**; Details	Budapest, Hungary	Spain	Netherlands	Hungary	8
16	**2016**; Details	Belgrade, Serbia	Hungary	Netherlands	Italy	12
17	**2018**; Details	Barcelona, Spain	Netherlands	Greece	Spain	12
18	**2020**; Details	Budapest, Hungary	Spain	Russia	Hungary	12
19	**2022**; Details	Split, Croatia	Spain	Greece	Italy	12
20	**2024**; Details	Eindhoven, Netherlands	Netherlands	Spain	Greece	16
21	**2026**; Details	Funchal, Portugal	Netherlands	Hungary	Greece	16

=== Medal table ===
Rank	Nation	Gold	Silver	Bronze	Total
1	Netherlands	7	4	3	14
2	Italy	5	2	3	10
3	Hungary	3	6	6	15
4	Russia	3	3	3	9
5	Spain	3	2	1	6
6	Greece	0	4	2	6
7	France	0	0	2	2
8	West Germany	0	0	1	1
Totals (8 entries)		**21**	**21**	**21**	**63**

=== Participation details ===
Team	1985 (Norway)	1987 (France)	1989 (West Germany)	1991 (Greece)	1993 (United Kingdom)	1995 (Austria)	1997 (Spain)	1999 (Italy)	2001 (Hungary)	2003 (Slovenia)	2006 (Serbia)	2008 (Spain)	2010 (Croatia)	2012 (Netherlands)	2014 (Hungary)	2016 (Serbia)	2018 (Spain)	2020 (Hungary)	2022 (Croatia)	2024 (Netherlands)	2026 (Portugal)	2028	Years
Belgium	5th	6th	9th	•	•	•	•	•	•	•	•	•	•	•	•	•	•	•	•	•	•		3
Bulgaria	•	•	•	•	•	•	•	•	•	•	•	•	•	•	•	•	•	•	•	16th	•		1
Croatia	Part of Yugoslavia				•	•	•	•	•	•	•	•	8th	•	•	11th	11th	10th	8th	8th	6th	Q	8
Czech Republic	Part of Czechoslovakia				11th	10th	12th	•	•	•	•	•	•	•	•	•	•	•	•	12th	•		4
France	7th	**3rd**	**3rd**	**4th**	5th	5th	8th	8th	8th	•	•	8th	•	•	7th	7th	7th	7th	7th	6th	8th	Q	18
Germany; West Germany	**3rd**	**4th**	5th	6th	6th	7th	6th	7th	7th	7th	7th	7th	7th	8th	•	8th	8th	11th	10th	11th	11th		20
Great Britain	6th	7th	•	8th	8th	8th	10th	•	•	•	•	•	•	7th	8th	•	•	•	•	7th	9th		10
Greece	•	•	7th	7th	7th	**4th**	7th	5th	**4th**	5th	6th	6th	**2nd**	**2nd**	6th	5th	**2nd**	6th	**2nd**	**3rd**	**3rd**	Q	20
Hungary	**2nd**	**2nd**	**2nd**	**1st**	**3rd**	**2nd**	5th	**4th**	**1st**	**2nd**	**3rd**	**3rd**	5th	**3rd**	**3rd**	**1st**	**4th**	**3rd**	5th	5th	**2nd**	Q	22
Israel	•	•	•	•	•	•	•	•	•	•	•	•	•	•	•	•	10th	9th	6th	9th	7th	Q	6
Italy	•	•	**4th**	**3rd**	**4th**	**1st**	**1st**	**1st**	**2nd**	**1st**	**2nd**	**4th**	**4th**	**1st**	**4th**	**3rd**	6th	5th	**3rd**	**4th**	**4th**	Q	20
Netherlands	**1st**	**1st**	**1st**	**2nd**	**1st**	**3rd**	**3rd**	**2nd**	5th	**4th**	5th	5th	**3rd**	6th	**2nd**	**2nd**	**1st**	**4th**	**4th**	**1st**	**1st**	Q	22
Norway	**4th**	5th	6th	•	•	•	•	•	•	•	•	•	•	•	•	•	•	•	•	•	•		3
Portugal	•	•	•	•	•	11th	11th	•	•	•	•	•	•	•	•	10th	•	•	•	•	12th		4
Romania	•	•	•	•	•	•	•	•	•	•	•	•	•	•	•	•	•	•	11th	14th	16th		3
Russia	Part of Soviet Union				**2nd**	6th	**2nd**	**3rd**	**3rd**	**3rd**	**1st**	**1st**	**1st**	**4th**	5th	6th	5th	**2nd**	DQ	DQ	DQ		14
Serbia	Part of Yugoslavia				Part of (Serbia and Montenegro) SCG / FRY						8th	•	•	•	•	9th	9th	12th	9th	10th	10th		7
(Serbia and Montenegro) SCG / FRY	Part of Yugoslavia				•	•	9th	•	•	•	Defunct												1
Slovakia	Part of Czechoslovakia				12th	•	•	•	•	•	•	•	•	•	•	•	•	8th	12th	15th	15th		5
Slovenia	Part of Yugoslavia				•	•	•	•	•	8th	•	•	•	•	•	•	•	•	•	•	•		1
Soviet Union	•	•	•	5th	Defunct																		1
Spain	•	•	•	•	9th	9th	**4th**	6th	6th	6th	**4th**	**2nd**	6th	5th	**1st**	**4th**	**3rd**	**1st**	**1st**	**2nd**	5th	Q	18
Sweden	8th	•	8th	•	•	•	•	•	•	•	•	•	•	•	•	•	•	•	•	•	•		2
Switzerland	•	•	•	•	10th	12th	•	•	•	•	•	•	•	•	•	•	•	•	•	•	14th		3
Turkey	•	•	•	•	•	•	•	•	•	•	•	•	•	•	•	12th	12th	•	•	13th	13th		4
Total	8	7	9	8	12	12	12	8	8	8	8	8	8	8	8	12	12	12	12	16	16		

=== Most successful players ===
Boldface denotes active water polo players and highest medal count among all players (including these who not included in these tables) per type.

==== Multiple gold medalists ====
Rank	Player	Country	From	To	Gold	Silver	Bronze	Total
1	Martina Miceli	Italy	1991	2006	**4**	2	1	7
2	Maddalena Musumeci	Italy	1995	2006	**4**	2	–	6
3	Carmela Allucci	Italy	1991	2003	**4**	1	1	6
3	Francesca Conti	Italy	1991	2003	**4**	1	1	6
3	Giusi Malato	Italy	1991	2003	**4**	1	1	6
3	Hedda Verdam	Netherlands	1985	1995	**4**	1	1	6
7	Melania Grego	Italy	1995	2003	**4**	1	–	5
8	Tania Di Mario	Italy	1999	2016	3	2	1	6
8	**Laura Ester**	Spain	2008	2024	3	2	1	6
8	**Maica García**	Spain	2008	2024	3	2	1	6
8	**Pili Peña**	Spain	2008	2024	3	2	1	6

==== Multiple medalists ====
The table shows players who have won at least 6 medals in total at the European Championships.

Rank	Player	Country	From	To	Gold	Silver	Bronze	Total
1	Mercédesz Stieber	Hungary	1989	2008	2	**3**	3	**8**
2	Martina Miceli	Italy	1991	2006	**4**	2	1	7
3	Sofia Konukh	Russia	1997	2010	3	1	3	7
4	Maddalena Musumeci	Italy	1995	2006	**4**	2	–	6
5	Carmela Allucci	Italy	1991	2003	**4**	1	1	6
5	Francesca Conti	Italy	1991	2003	**4**	1	1	6
5	Giusi Malato	Italy	1991	2003	**4**	1	1	6
5	Hedda Verdam	Netherlands	1985	1995	**4**	1	1	6
9	Tania Di Mario	Italy	1999	2016	3	2	1	6
9	**Laura Ester**	Spain	2008	2024	3	2	1	6
9	**Maica García**	Spain	2008	2024	3	2	1	6
9	**Pili Peña**	Spain	2008	2024	3	2	1	6
13	Elena Smurova	Russia	1997	2008	2	1	3	6

== Combined medal table ==
Rank	Nation	Gold	Silver	Bronze	Total
1	Hungary	16	14	12	42
2	Italy	8	4	10	22
3	Netherlands	8	4	4	16
4	Soviet Union	5	3	2	10
5	Serbia	5	1	1	7
6	Spain	4	5	5	14
7	Russia (Note: Soviet Union won 5 gold, 3 silver and 2 bronze medals.)	3	3	4	10
8	Germany (Note: West Germany won 2 gold and 3 bronze medals.)	2	3	4	9
9	Croatia	2	3	1	6
10	FR Yugoslavia / Serbia and Montenegro	2	1	0	3
11	West Germany	2	0	2	4
12	Yugoslavia	1	7	4	12
13	Montenegro	1	2	1	4
14	Greece	0	4	3	7
15	Sweden	0	3	0	3
16	France	0	1	2	3
17	East Germany	0	1	0	1
18	Belgium	0	0	3	3
19	Austria	0	0	1	1
Totals (19 entries)		59	59	59	177

== Overall ==
=== Men (1926-2024) ===
Rank	Team	Part	M	W	D	L	GF	GA	GD	Points
1	Hungary	35	233	176	18	39	2184	1353	+831	546
2	Serbia	31	209	147	23	39	1823	1195	+628	464
4	Italy	34	225	128	18	79	1839	1436	+403	402
3	Russia	26	187	106	22	59	1600	1378	+222	340
5	Spain	30	208	102	22	84	1738	1511	+227	328
6	Germany	33	217	100	21	96	1580	1604	-24	321
7	Croatia	16	114	68	15	32	1174	888	+286	219
9	Netherlands	30	187	62	22	103	1324	1430	-106	208
8	Greece	20	143	60	13	70	1276	1205	+71	193
10	Romania	26	172	56	19	97	1322	1475	-153	187
11	Montenegro	9	64	39	8	18	708	536	+172	125
12	France	19	114	35	11	68	659	863	-204	116
13	Sweden	10	56	24	8	24	229	231	-2	80
14	Belgium	11	59	19	9	31	198	254	-56	66
15	Slovakia	12	78	20	5	53	583	814	-231	65
16	Czechoslovakia	7	38	12	1	25	203	246	-43	37
17	Bulgaria	7	46	10	4	32	275	419	-144	34
18	Austria	9	43	10	1	32	146	361	-215	31
19	East Germany	3	18	9	3	6	62	49	+13	30
20	Poland	4	23	8	2	13	152	181	-29	26
21	Georgia	6	38	8	1	29	317	486	-169	25
22	Great Britain	9	49	6	2	41	196	394	-198	20
23	North Macedonia	3	21	5	1	15	161	221	-60	16
24	Ukraine	3	20	4	0	16	137	209	-72	12
25	Turkey	7	46	3	3	40	250	686	-436	12
26	Slovenia	5	29	3	0	26	199	368	-169	9
27	Malta	5	27	2	3	22	191	423	-232	9
28	Israel	2	11	1	2	8	81	169	-88	5
29	Finland	1	6	1	1	4	19	51	-32	4
30	Ireland	2	13	1	1	11	37	104	-67	4
31	Denmark	1	6	0	1	5	50	105	-55	1
32	England	1	2	0	0	2	4	12	-8	0
33	Switzerland	1	6	0	0	6	17	77	-60	0

POL:

GBR 9 + ENG 1

=== Women (1985-2024) ===
Rank	Team	Part	M	W	D	L	GF	GA	GD	Points
1	Netherlands	20	125	92	9	24	1765	779	+986	285
2	Hungary	20	127	89	9	30	1615	862	+753	276
3	Italy	18	115	77	9	29	1275	834	+441	402
4	Russia	15	96	62	6	28	1193	707	+486	192
5	Spain	16	98	56	3	39	1149	768	+381	171
6	Greece	18	103	53	7	50	1019	820	+199	166
7	France	16	99	38	0	61	735	1093	-358	114
8	Germany	19	105	34	3	68	899	1216	-317	105
9	Great Britain	9	51	12	0	39	337	607	-270	36
10	Serbia	7	40	11	2	27	279	545	-266	35
11	Israel	4	26	8	2	16	200	339	-139	26
12	Norway	3	17	7	0	10	134	188	-54	21
13	Croatia	6	37	6	3	28	231	649	-418	21
14	Czechoslovakia	4	23	5	1	17	148	317	-169	16
15	Belgium	3	17	4	1	12	114	195	-81	13
16	Slovakia	4	25	4	0	21	144	418	-274	12
17	Romania	2	11	3	0	8	74	157	-83	9
18	Portugal	3	17	2	0	15	65	274	-209	6
19	Turkey	3	17	2	0	15	92	308	-216	6
20	Switzerland	2	11	1	1	9	45	159	-114	4
21	Bulgaria	1	5	0	0	5	39	107	-68	0
22	Slovenia	1	4	0	0	4	4	94	-90	0
23	Sweden	2	11	0	0	11	51	171	-120	0

TCH: 1993+1995+1997+2024

== See also ==
=== Nations ===
- LEN European U19 Water Polo Championship
- European Aquatics U18 Water Polo Championship
- European Aquatics U16 Water Polo Championship
- LEN European Masters Water Polo Championship

=== Clubs ===
==== Men ====
- European Aquatics Champions League
- European Aquatics Euro Cup
- European Aquatics Conference Cup
- European Aquatics Challenger Cup
- European Aquatics Super Cup

==== Women ====
- European Aquatics Women's Champions League
- European Aquatics Women's Euro Cup
- European Aquatics Women's Conference Cup
- European Aquatics Women's Challenger Cup
- European Aquatics Women's Super Cup

== Sources ==
- Juba, Kelvin (June 2020). "2020 LEN European Water Polo Championships (past and present results)" (PDF). len.eu. LEN.

== Results ==
- Men Water Polo Europe Championships Archive
- Women Water Polo Europe Championships Archive
