= Netherlands at the 2022 World Aquatics Championships =

- Flag of the Netherlands
- World Aquatics code: NED
- National federation: Royal Dutch Swimming Federation
- Website: www.knzb.nl

in Budapest, Hungary
- Competitors: 36 in 5 sports
- Medals Ranked 15th: Gold 1 Silver 1 Bronze 3 Total 5

World Aquatics Championships appearances
- 1973; 1975; 1978; 1982; 1986; 1991; 1994; 1998; 2001; 2003; 2005; 2007; 2009; 2011; 2013; 2015; 2017; 2019; 2022; 2023; 2024; 2025

The Netherlands competed at the 2022 World Aquatics Championships in Budapest, Hungary from 18 June to 3 July.

== Medalists ==
Medal	Name	Sport	Event	Date
Gold	Sharon van Rouwendaal	Open water swimming	Women's 10 km	June 29
Silver	Arno Kamminga	Swimming	Men's 100 metre breaststroke	June 19
Bronze	Kira Toussaint; Arno Kamminga; Nyls Korstanje; Marrit Steenbergen	Swimming	Mixed 4 × 100 metre medley relay	June 21
Bronze	Sharon van Rouwendaal	Open water swimming	Women's 25 km	June 30
Bronze	Women's waterpolo team: Laura Aarts Bente Rogge Maxine Schaap Lola Moolhuijzen Sarah Buis Sabrina van der Sloot Vivian Sevenich Simone van de Kraats Nina ten Broek Iris Wolves Ilse Koolhaas Brigitte Sleeking Kitty Lynn Joustra	Water polo	Women's tournament	July 2

== Artistic swimming ==
The Netherlands entered 2 artistic swimmers (2 female).

Athlete	Event	Preliminaries		Final	
Athlete	Event	Points	Rank	Points	Rank
Bregje de Brouwer; Marloes Steenbeek	Duet technical routine	85.5859	7	86.1420	8
Bregje de Brouwer; Marloes Steenbeek	Duet free routine	86.8000	8	87.4667	8

== Diving ==
Women

Athlete	Event	Preliminaries		Semifinals		Final	
Athlete	Event	Points	Rank	Points	Rank	Points	Rank
Daphne Wils	1 m springboard	236.90	16	—N/a		did not advance	
Guurtje Praasterink	10 m platform	287.80	11	289.80	11	268.55	11

== Open water swimming ==
Men

Athlete	Event	Time	Rank
Lars Bottelier	Men's 25 km	5:02:51.6	6
Marcel Schouten	Men's 25 km	5:02:46.7	4

Women

Athlete	Event	Time	Rank
Sharon van Rouwendaal	Women's 5 km	58:08.9	10
Sharon van Rouwendaal	Women's 10 km	2:02:29.2	1st place, gold medalist(s)
Sharon van Rouwendaal	Women's 25 km	5:24:15.3	3rd place, bronze medalist(s)

== Swimming ==
Men

Athlete	Event	Heat		Semifinal		Final	
Athlete	Event	Time	Rank	Time	Rank	Time	Rank
Thom de Boer	50 m freestyle	21.91	8 Q	21.99	12	did not advance	
Casper Corbeau	50 m breaststroke	27.48	11 Q	27.44	12	did not advance	
Casper Corbeau	100 m breaststroke	59.89	6 Q	1:00.24	13	did not advance	
Casper Corbeau	200 m breaststroke	2:09.15	2 Q	2:09.17	6 Q	2:09.62	7
Arno Kamminga	100 m breaststroke	58.69	1 Q	58.89	3	58.62	2nd place, silver medalist(s)
Arno Kamminga	200 m breaststroke	2:10.33	10 Q	Withdraw			
Nyls Korstanje	50 m butterfly	23.27	9 Q	23.14	10	did not advance	
Nyls Korstanje	100 m butterfly	51.97	15 Q	51.41	9	did not advance	
Stan Pijnenburg	100 m freestyle	49.11	28	did not advance			
Jesse Puts	50 m freestyle	22.09	15 Q	22.02	15	did not advance	
Thomas Verhoeven	50 m butterfly	23.64	23	did not advance			

Women

Athlete	Event	Heat		Semifinal		Final	
Athlete	Event	Time	Rank	Time	Rank	Time	Rank
Kim Busch	50 m freestyle	25.06	=9 Q	25.19	=13	did not advance	
Tessa Giele	50 m butterfly	26.63	19	did not advance			
Rosey Metz	50 m breaststroke	30.71	11 Q	30.94	14	did not advance	
Anne Palmans	50 m breaststroke	31.37	21	did not advance			
Valerie van Roon	50 m freestyle	25.04	11 Q	25.19	=13	did not advance	
Tes Schouten	100 m breaststroke	1:07.18	14 Q	1:07.20	15	did not advance	
Tes Schouten	200 m breaststroke	2:26.85	11 Q	2:26.85	12	did not advance	
Marrit Steenbergen	100 m freestyle	54.13	7 Q	54.11	11	did not advance	
Marrit Steenbergen	200 m freestyle	1:58.33	13 Q	1:58.93	15	did not advance	
Marrit Steenbergen	200 m individual medley	2:10.60	5	2:11.20	10	did not advance	
Kira Toussaint	50 m backstroke	28.17	13 Q	27.69	7 Q	27.80	8
Kira Toussaint	100 m backstroke	59.69	4 Q	59.16	4 Q	59.99	6
Maaike de Waard	50 m butterfly	25.92	4 Q	25.75	8 Q	25.85	8
Maaike de Waard	50 m backstroke	28.04	10 Q	27.77	10	did not advance	
Maaike de Waard	100 m backstroke	1:00.46	10 Q	1:00.15	9	did not advance	
Marrit Steenbergen; Tessa Giele; Kim Busch; Valerie van Roon	4 × 100 m freestyle relay	3:37.56	6 Q	n/a		3:38.18	7
Kira Toussaint; Tes Schouten; Maaike de Waard; Marrit Steenbergen	4 × 100 m medley relay	3:57.48	2 Q	n/a		3:57.24	5

Mixed

Athlete	Event	Heat		Semifinal		Final	
Athlete	Event	Time	Rank	Time	Rank	Time	Rank
Stan Pijnenburg; Jesse Puts; Tessa Giele; Marrit Steenbergen	4 × 100 m freestyle relay	3:25.86	4 Q	n/a		3:24.24	5
Kira Toussaint; Arno Kamminga; Nyls Korstanje; Marrit Steenbergen	4 × 100 m medley relay	3:43.48	2 Q	n/a		3:41.54	3rd place, bronze medalist(s)

== Water polo ==
Summary

Key:
- FT – After full time.
- P – Match decided by penalty-shootout.

Team	Event	Group stage				Playoff	Quarterfinal	Semifinals	Final	
Team	Event	Opposition Score	Opposition Score	Opposition Score	Rank	Opposition Score	Opposition Score	Opposition Score	Opposition Score	Rank
Netherlands	Women's tournament	Argentina; W 29–6	United States; L 7–11	South Africa; W 22–1	2	Canada; W 10–7	Greece; W 12–7	Hungary; L 12–13	Italy; W 7–5	3rd place, bronze medalist(s)

=== Women's tournament ===
Team roster

The following is Dutch roster in the Water polo at the 2022 World Aquatics Championships – Women's tournament.

Head coach: Evangelos Doudesis

- 1 Laura Aarts GK
- 2 Iris Wolves CF
- 3 Brigitte Sleeking D
- 4 Sabrina van der Sloot D
- 5 Lola Moolhuijzen D
- 6 Simone van de Kraats D
- 7 Rozanne Voorvelt FP
- 8 Vivian Sevenich CF
- 9 Kitty-Lynn Joustra CF
- 10 Ilse Koolhaas CB
- 11 Maxine Schaap D
- 12 Nina ten Broek D
- 13 Sarah Buis GK

Group A

Pos	Team	Pld	W	D	L	GF	GA	GD	Pts	Qualification
1	United States	3	3	0	0	58	12	+46	6	Quarterfinals
2	Netherlands	3	2	0	1	58	18	+40	4	Playoffs
3	Argentina	3	1	0	2	16	58	−42	2	Playoffs
4	South Africa	3	0	0	3	9	53	−44	0	

Source: Sportresult
Rules for classification: 1) points; 2) head-to-head points; 3) head-to-head goal difference; 4) head-to-head number of goals scored; 5) Goal difference.

20 June 2022; 19:30	Report	Netherlands	29–6	Argentina	Debrecen Swimming Pool Complex, Debrecen; Referees: Harvey Hinds (CUR), Edgar Baron (COL)
20 June 2022; 19:30	Report	Score by quarters: 8–1, 8–1, 6–2, 7–2			Debrecen Swimming Pool Complex, Debrecen; Referees: Harvey Hinds (CUR), Edgar Baron (COL)
20 June 2022; 19:30	Report	Van de Kraats 5	Goals	Ruiz 3	Debrecen Swimming Pool Complex, Debrecen; Referees: Harvey Hinds (CUR), Edgar Baron (COL)

22 June 2022; 19:30	Report	United States	11–7	Netherlands	Debrecen Swimming Pool Complex, Debrecen; Referees: Ivan Raković (SRB), Megan Perry (NZL)
22 June 2022; 19:30	Report	Score by quarters: 3–2, 3–1, 3–2, 2–2			Debrecen Swimming Pool Complex, Debrecen; Referees: Ivan Raković (SRB), Megan Perry (NZL)
22 June 2022; 19:30	Report	Musselman 4	Goals	Van de Kraats, Moolhuijzen 2	Debrecen Swimming Pool Complex, Debrecen; Referees: Ivan Raković (SRB), Megan Perry (NZL)

24 June 2022; 19:30	Report	Netherlands	22–1	South Africa	Debrecen Swimming Pool Complex, Debrecen; Referees: Ivan Raković (SRB), Edgar Baron (COL)
24 June 2022; 19:30	Report	Score by quarters: 5–1, 4–0, 7–0, 6–0			Debrecen Swimming Pool Complex, Debrecen; Referees: Ivan Raković (SRB), Edgar Baron (COL)
24 June 2022; 19:30	Report	Moolhuijzen 5	Goals	Versfeld 1	Debrecen Swimming Pool Complex, Debrecen; Referees: Ivan Raković (SRB), Edgar Baron (COL)

Play-offs

26 June 2022; 14:00	Report	Canada	7–10	Netherlands	Alfréd Hajós National Swimming Stadium, Budapest; Referees: Raffaele Colombo (ITA), David Gómez (ESP)
26 June 2022; 14:00	Report	Score by quarters: 2–1, 1–2, 2–6, 2–1			Alfréd Hajós National Swimming Stadium, Budapest; Referees: Raffaele Colombo (ITA), David Gómez (ESP)
26 June 2022; 14:00	Report	seven players 1	Goals	three players 2	Alfréd Hajós National Swimming Stadium, Budapest; Referees: Raffaele Colombo (ITA), David Gómez (ESP)

Quarterfinals

28 June 2022; 19:30	Report	Greece	7–12	Netherlands	Alfréd Hajós National Swimming Stadium, Budapest; Referees: David Gómez (ESP), Boris Margeta (SLO)
28 June 2022; 19:30	Report	Score by quarters: 1–3, 2–3, 3–3, 1–3			Alfréd Hajós National Swimming Stadium, Budapest; Referees: David Gómez (ESP), Boris Margeta (SLO)
28 June 2022; 19:30	Report	Patra, E. Plevritou 2	Goals	Moolhuijzen 4	Alfréd Hajós National Swimming Stadium, Budapest; Referees: David Gómez (ESP), Boris Margeta (SLO)

Semifinals

30 June 2022; 21:00	Report	Hungary	13–12	Netherlands	Alfréd Hajós National Swimming Stadium, Budapest; Referees: Maro Savinović (CRO), Frank Ohme (GER)
30 June 2022; 21:00	Report	Score by quarters: 2–3, 4–3, 5–4, 2–2			Alfréd Hajós National Swimming Stadium, Budapest; Referees: Maro Savinović (CRO), Frank Ohme (GER)
30 June 2022; 21:00	Report	Leimeter 4	Goals	Van de Kraats 5	Alfréd Hajós National Swimming Stadium, Budapest; Referees: Maro Savinović (CRO), Frank Ohme (GER)

Third place game

2 July 2022; 14:30	Report	Italy	5–7	Netherlands	Alfréd Hajós National Swimming Stadium, Budapest; Referees: Maro Savinović (CRO), Georgios Stavridis (GRE)
2 July 2022; 14:30	Report	Score by quarters: 2–1, 2–1, 0–2, 1–3			Alfréd Hajós National Swimming Stadium, Budapest; Referees: Maro Savinović (CRO), Georgios Stavridis (GRE)
2 July 2022; 14:30	Report	Giustini, Marletta 2	Goals	seven players 1	Alfréd Hajós National Swimming Stadium, Budapest; Referees: Maro Savinović (CRO), Georgios Stavridis (GRE)
