= Water polo at the 2022 World Aquatics Championships =

World Aquatics Championships event

- Host city: Budapest, Hungary
- Date(s): 20 June – 3 July
- Venue(s): Alfréd Hajós National Swimming Stadium, Budapest; Swimming pool Sopron, Debrecen, Szeged
- Events: 2

Water polo at the 2022 World Aquatics Championships was held between 20 June and 3 July 2022.

== Schedule ==
Two competitions were held.

All time are local (UTC+2).

Date	Time	Round
20 June 2022	18:00	Preliminary round
21 June 2022	18:00	Preliminary round
22 June 2022	18:00	Preliminary round
23 June 2022	18:00	Preliminary round
24 June 2022	18:00	Preliminary round
25 June 2022	18:00	Preliminary round
26 June 2022	09:00	Play-offs/Placement matches
27 June 2022	09:00	Play-offs/Placement matches
28 June 2022	14:00	Quarterfinals/Placement matches
29 June 2022	14:00	Quarterfinals/Placement matches
30 June 2022	09:00	Semifinals/Placement matches
1 July 2022	09:00	Semifinals/Placement matches
2 July 2022	13:00	Women's finals
3 July 2022	13:00	Men's finals

== Qualification ==
A total of 16 teams qualified for each tournament.

=== Men ===
Event	Dates	Hosts	Quota	Qualifier(s)
Host nation	—	—	1	Hungary
2020 Summer Olympics	25 July – 8 August 2021	(Japan) Tokyo	4	Serbia; Greece; Spain; Croatia
2020 FINA World League	26 June – 1 July 2020	(Georgia (country)) Tbilisi	2	Montenegro; United States
2020 European Championship	14–26 January 2020	(Hungary) Budapest	3	Italy; ~~Russia~~; Germany; Georgia
2022 Intercontinental Cup (Americas qualifier)	7–13 March 2022	(Peru) Lima	2	Canada; Brazil
2018 Asian Games	16 August – 1 September 2018	(Indonesia) Jakarta	2	Kazakhstan; Japan
African Selection	—	—	1	South Africa
Oceanian Selection	—	—	1	Australia
Total			16	

Russia was excluded due to the 2022 Russian invasion of Ukraine.

=== Women ===
Event	Dates	Hosts	Quota	Qualifier(s)
Host nation	—	—	1	Hungary
2020 Summer Olympics	24 July – 7 August 2021	(Japan) Tokyo	4+1	United States; Spain; ~~Russia~~; Australia; Netherlands; Canada
2020 FINA World League	14– 19 June 2020	(Greece) Athens	0	— (Note: With the World League finalists already qualified through the Olympic Rankings, those two spots were re-allocated to the Olympics)
2020 European Championship	12–25 January 2020	(Hungary) Budapest	3	Italy; Greece; France
2022 Intercontinental Cup (Americas qualifier)	7–13 March 2022	(Peru) Lima	2	Brazil; Argentina
2018 Asian Games	16 August – 1 September 2018	(Indonesia) Jakarta	2	~~China~~; ~~Japan~~; Kazakhstan; Thailand
African Selection	—	—	1	South Africa
Oceanian Selection	—	—	1	New Zealand
Wild card	—	—	1	Colombia
Total			16	

Russia was excluded due to the 2022 Russian invasion of Ukraine.
China and Japan withdrew before the tournament.

== Medal summary ==
=== Medal table ===
* Host nation (Hungary)

Rank	Nation	Gold	Silver	Bronze	Total
1	Spain	1	0	0	1
1	United States	1	0	0	1
3	Hungary	0	1	0	1
3	Italy	0	1	0	1
5	Greece	0	0	1	1
5	Netherlands	0	0	1	1
Totals (6 entries)		2	2	2	6

=== Medalists ===
Event	Gold	Silver	Bronze
Men	Spain Unai Aguirre; Alberto Munarriz; Álvaro Granados; Bernat Sanahuja; Miguel de Toro; Marc Larumbe; Martin Famera; Sergi Cabanas; Roger Tahull; Felipe Perrone (c); Blai Mallarach; Alejandro Bustos; Eduardo Lorrio Head coach: David Lozano	Italy Marco Del Lungo (c); Francesco Di Fulvio; Luca Damonte; Matteo Iocchi Gratta; Andrea Fondelli; Giacomo Canella; Luca Marziali; Gonzalo Echenique; Nicholas Presciutti; Lorenzo Bruni; Edoardo Di Somma; Vincenzo Dolce; Gianmarco Nicosia Head coach: Alessandro Campagna	Greece Manos Zerdevas; Dinos Genidounias; Dimitris Skoumpakis; Stathis Kalogeropoulos; Yiannis Fountoulis (c); Alexandros Papanastasiou; Giorgos Dervisis; Stelios Argyropoulos; Costas Gouvis; Costas Kakaris; Dimitris Nikolaidis; Angelos Vlachopoulos; Panagiotis Tzortzatos Head coach: Thodoris Vlachos
Women	United States Ashleigh Johnson; Madeline Musselman; Tara Prentice; Rachel Fattal; Ava Elizabeth Johnson; Margaret Steffens; Stephania Haralabidis; Ryann Neushul; Denise Mammolito; Kaleigh Gilchrist; Bayley Weber; Jordan Raney; Amanda Longann Head coach: Adam Krikorian	Hungary Edina Gangl; Dorottya Szilágyi; Vanda Vályi; Gréta Gurisatti; Zsuzsanna Máté; Rebecca Parkes; Geraldine Mahieu; Rita Keszthelyi; Dóra Leimeter; Natasa Rybanska; Kamilla Faragó; Krisztina Garda; Alda Magyari Head coach: Attila Biró	Netherlands Laura Aarts; Iris Wolves; Brigitte Sleeking; Sabrina van der Sloot; Lola Moolhuijzen; Simone van de Kraats; Rozanne Voorvelt; Vivian Sevenich; Kitty Joustra; Ilse Koolhaas; Maxine Schaap; Nina ten Broek; Sarah Buis Head coach: Evangelos Doudesis
