= 2016 Women's European Water Polo Championship squads =

This article shows all participating team squads at the 2016 Women's European Water Polo Championship, held in Serbia from 10–22 January 2016.

== Croatia ==
No.	Name	Date of birth	Position	L/R	Height	Weight
1	Alexandra Ratkovic	22 August 2000	Goalkeeper		170 cm (5 ft 7 in)	65 kg (143 lb)
2	Emmi Miljkovic	2 September 1988			174 cm (5 ft 9 in)	67 kg (148 lb)
3	Petra Zupanic	25 June 1993			158 cm (5 ft 2 in)	54 kg (119 lb)
4	Tereza Balic	4 June 1998			177 cm (5 ft 10 in)	93 kg (205 lb)
5	Dina Lordan	20 September 1994			171 cm (5 ft 7 in)	67 kg (148 lb)
6	Matea Skelin	24 February 1997			178 cm (5 ft 10 in)	77 kg (170 lb)
7	Anamaria Brnas	14 December 1994			175 cm (5 ft 9 in)	63 kg (139 lb)
8	Domina Butic	10 August 2000			164 cm (5 ft 5 in)	63 kg (139 lb)
9	Petra Bukic	29 September 1999			177 cm (5 ft 10 in)	70 kg (150 lb)
10	Ivana Butic	7 March 1996			159 cm (5 ft 3 in)	60 kg (130 lb)
11	Julija Bozan	1 April 1999			173 cm (5 ft 8 in)	60 kg (130 lb)
12	Lea Gegic	29 May 1998			190 cm (6 ft 3 in)	88 kg (194 lb)
13	Sara Srhoj	8 May 1998	Goalkeeper		174 cm (5 ft 9 in)	63 kg (139 lb)

== France ==
No.	Name	Date of birth	Position	L/R	Height	Weight
1	Lorene Derenty	4 September 1994	Goalkeeper	R	168 cm (5 ft 6 in)	58 kg (128 lb)
2	Estelle Millot	21 December 1993	Driver	R	164 cm (5 ft 5 in)	62 kg (137 lb)
3	Lea Bachelier	13 February 1993	Driver	R	178 cm (5 ft 10 in)	65 kg (143 lb)
4	Aurore Sacre	13 April 1993	Driver	R	172 cm (5 ft 8 in)	58 kg (128 lb)
5	Louise Guillet	31 January 1986	Wing	R	173 cm (5 ft 8 in)	60 kg (130 lb)
6	Geraldine Mahieu	15 September 1993	Point	R	188 cm (6 ft 2 in)	73 kg (161 lb)
7	Marie Barbieux	12 August 1991	Centre Forward	R	180 cm (5 ft 11 in)	78 kg (172 lb)
8	Marion Tardy	12 July 1993	Wing	L	170 cm (5 ft 7 in)	68 kg (150 lb)
9	Adeline Sacre	12 March 1998	Driver	R	170 cm (5 ft 7 in)	61 kg (134 lb)
10	Michaela Jaskova	4 June 1993	Wing	L	170 cm (5 ft 7 in)	62 kg (137 lb)
11	Clemence Clerc	18 February 1991	Point	R	185 cm (6 ft 1 in)	75 kg (165 lb)
12	Audrey Daule	6 May 1993	Wing	R	165 cm (5 ft 5 in)	635 kg (1,400 lb)
13	Morgane Chabrier	17 October 1993	Goalkeeper	R	163 cm (5 ft 4 in)	52 kg (115 lb)

== Germany ==
No.	Name	Date of birth	Position	L/R	Height	Weight
1	Bianca Ahrens	9 January 1991	Goalkeeper	R	171 cm (5 ft 7 in)	72 kg (159 lb)
2	Belen Vosseberg	15 December 1997	Wing	L	167 cm (5 ft 6 in)	61 kg (134 lb)
3	Nadja Kreis	8 September 1991	Point	R	170 cm (5 ft 7 in)	64 kg (141 lb)
4	Bianca Seyfert	15 August 1993	Wing	R	173 cm (5 ft 8 in)	65 kg (143 lb)
5	Claudia Blomenkamp	30 December 1986	Centre Forward	R	180 cm (5 ft 11 in)	85 kg (187 lb)
6	Gesa Deike	26 June 1995	Point	R	170 cm (5 ft 7 in)	61 kg (134 lb)
7	Anja Seyfert	9 April 1990	Wing	R	166 cm (5 ft 5 in)	63 kg (139 lb)
8	Claudia Kern	28 January 1990	Driver	R	174 cm (5 ft 9 in)	70 kg (150 lb)
9	Jennifer Stiefel	13 July 1992	Point	R	166 cm (5 ft 5 in)	63 kg (139 lb)
10	Lilian Adamski	17 September 1997	Driver	R	174 cm (5 ft 9 in)	55 kg (121 lb)
11	Carmen Gelse	22 September 1987	Driver	R	177 cm (5 ft 10 in)	72 kg (159 lb)
12	Anika Ebell	28 September 1994	Point	R	170 cm (5 ft 7 in)	61 kg (134 lb)
13	Michelle Reinhart	29 October 1994	Goalkeeper	R	185 cm (6 ft 1 in)	75 kg (165 lb)

== Greece ==
No.	Name	Date of birth	Position	L/R	Height	Weight
1	Eleni Kouvdou	9 August 1989	Goalkeeper	R	175 cm (5 ft 9 in)	64 kg (141 lb)
2	Christina Tsoukala	8 July 1991	Point	R	184 cm (6 ft 0 in)	74 kg (163 lb)
3	Ioanna Chydirioti	15 April 1997	Driver	R	174 cm (5 ft 9 in)	64 kg (141 lb)
4	Vasiliki Diamantopoulou	12 March 1993	Point	R	180 cm (5 ft 11 in)	74 kg (163 lb)
5	Margarita Plevritou	17 November 1994	Centre Forward	R	177 cm (5 ft 10 in)	70 kg (150 lb)
6	Alkisti Avramidou	26 February 1988	Wing	R	170 cm (5 ft 7 in)	58 kg (128 lb)
7	Alexandra Asimaki	28 June 1988	Centre Forward	R	170 cm (5 ft 7 in)	65 kg (143 lb)
8	Antigoni Roumpesi	19 July 1983	Driver	R	177 cm (5 ft 10 in)	78 kg (172 lb)
9	Christina Kotsia	10 July 1994	Point	R	178 cm (5 ft 10 in)	77 kg (170 lb)
10	Triantafyllia Manolioudaki	19 March 1986	Driver	R	170 cm (5 ft 7 in)	62 kg (137 lb)
11	Eleftheria Plevritou	23 April 1997	Driver	R	177 cm (5 ft 10 in)	66 kg (146 lb)
12	Eleni Xenaki	5 July 1997	Centre Forward	R	177 cm (5 ft 10 in)	80 kg (180 lb)
13	Chrysoula Diamantopoulou	21 September 1995	Goalkeeper	L	185 cm (6 ft 1 in)	72 kg (159 lb)

== Hungary ==
No.	Name	Date of birth	Position	L/R	Height	Weight	Club
1	Edina Gangl	25 June 1990	Goalkeeper	R	181 cm (5 ft 11 in)	64 kg (141 lb)	(Hungary) UVSE
2	Dóra Czigány	23 October 1992	Wing	R	173 cm (5 ft 8 in)	60 kg (130 lb)	(Hungary) Eger
3	Dóra Antal	9 September 1993	Wing	R	169 cm (5 ft 7 in)	62 kg (137 lb)	(Hungary) UVSE
4	Hanna Kisteleki	10 March 1991	Wing	L	172 cm (5 ft 8 in)	63 kg (139 lb)	(Hungary) UVSE
5	Gabriella Szűcs	7 March 1988	Driver	R	183 cm (6 ft 0 in)	74 kg (163 lb)	(Hungary) UVSE
6	Orsolya Takács	20 May 1985	Centre Forward	R	190 cm (6 ft 3 in)	83 kg (183 lb)	(Hungary) BVSC
7	Anna Illés	21 February 1994	Point	R	180 cm (5 ft 11 in)	73 kg (161 lb)	(Hungary) BVSC
8	Rita Keszthelyi (c)	10 December 1991	Driver	R	178 cm (5 ft 10 in)	67 kg (148 lb)	(Hungary) UVSE
9	Ildikó Tóth	23 April 1987	Centre Forward	R	175 cm (5 ft 9 in)	72 kg (159 lb)	(Hungary) UVSE
10	Barbara Bujka	5 September 1986	Centre Forward	L	172 cm (5 ft 8 in)	82 kg (181 lb)	(Hungary) Szentes
11	Dóra Csabai	20 April 1989	Point	R	175 cm (5 ft 9 in)	63 kg (139 lb)	(Hungary) UVSE
12	Krisztina Garda	16 July 1994	Point	R	170 cm (5 ft 7 in)	76 kg (168 lb)	(Hungary) Dunaújvárosi Főiskola
13	Orsolya Kasó	22 November 1988	Goalkeeper		187 cm (6 ft 2 in)	72 kg (159 lb)	(Hungary) Dunaújvárosi Főiskola
Head coach: Attila Bíró

== Italy ==
No.	Name	Date of birth	Position	L/R	Height	Weight
1	Giulia Gorlero	26 September 1990	Goalkeeper		179 cm (5 ft 10 in)	70 kg (150 lb)
2	Chiara Tabani	27 August 1994			176 cm (5 ft 9 in)	73 kg (161 lb)
3	Arianna Garibotti	9 December 1989			169 cm (5 ft 7 in)	71 kg (157 lb)
4	Elisa Queirolo	6 March 1991			168 cm (5 ft 6 in)	63 kg (139 lb)
5	Federica Radicchi	21 December 1988			169 cm (5 ft 7 in)	64 kg (141 lb)
6	Rosaria Aiello	12 May 1989			174 cm (5 ft 9 in)	74 kg (163 lb)
7	Tania Di Mario	4 May 1979			167 cm (5 ft 6 in)	59 kg (130 lb)
8	Roberta Bianconi	8 July 1989			175 cm (5 ft 9 in)	76 kg (168 lb)
9	Giulia Emmolo	16 October 1991			172 cm (5 ft 8 in)	66 kg (146 lb)
10	Francesca Pomeri	18 February 1993			173 cm (5 ft 8 in)	73 kg (161 lb)
11	Aleksandra Cotti	13 December 1988			166 cm (5 ft 5 in)	64 kg (141 lb)
12	Teresa Frassinetti	24 December 1985			178 cm (5 ft 10 in)	70 kg (150 lb)
13	Laura Teani	13 March 1991	Goalkeeper		175 cm (5 ft 9 in)	66 kg (146 lb)

== Netherlands ==
No.	Name	Date of birth	Position	L/R	Height	Weight
1	Laura Aarts	10 August 1996	Goalkeeper	R	175 cm (5 ft 9 in)	70 kg (150 lb)
2	Yasemin Smit	21 November 1984	Driver	R	180 cm (5 ft 11 in)	71 kg (157 lb)
3	Dagmar Genee	31 January 1989	Point	R	178 cm (5 ft 10 in)	68 kg (150 lb)
4	Sabrina van der Sloot	16 March 1991	Driver	R	175 cm (5 ft 9 in)	67 kg (148 lb)
5	Amarens Genee	22 February 1991	Driver	R	174 cm (5 ft 9 in)	69 kg (152 lb)
6	Nomi Stomphorst	23 August 1992	Wing	R	173 cm (5 ft 8 in)	67 kg (148 lb)
7	Marloes Nijhuis	14 March 1991	Driver	R	178 cm (5 ft 10 in)	70 kg (150 lb)
8	Vivian Sevenich	28 February 1993	Centre Forward	L	180 cm (5 ft 11 in)	74 kg (163 lb)
9	Maud Megens	6 February 1996	Driver	R	183 cm (6 ft 0 in)	68 kg (150 lb)
10	Isabella van Toorn	9 July 1995	Driver	R	170 cm (5 ft 7 in)	71 kg (157 lb)
11	Lieke Klaassen	23 April 1991	Point	R	182 cm (6 ft 0 in)	78 kg (172 lb)
12	Leonie van der Molen	25 May 1987	Centre Forward	R	176 cm (5 ft 9 in)	67 kg (148 lb)
13	Debby Willemsz	10 May 1994	Goalkeeper	R	174 cm (5 ft 9 in)	73 kg (161 lb)

== Portugal ==
No.	Name	Date of birth	Position	L/R	Height	Weight
1	Janete Sousa	9 March 1989	Goalkeeper	R	171 cm (5 ft 7 in)	65 kg (143 lb)
2	Rita Pereira	24 June 1992	Wing	R	165 cm (5 ft 5 in)	72 kg (159 lb)
3	Mariana Sarmento	15 June 1984	Driver	R	170 cm (5 ft 7 in)	75 kg (165 lb)
4	Catarina Reis	13 February 1995	Centre Forward	R	164 cm (5 ft 5 in)	56 kg (123 lb)
5	Ines Nunes	14 August 1987	Centre Forward	R	168 cm (5 ft 6 in)	70 kg (150 lb)
6	Rute Estorninho	6 November 1986	Driver	R	178 cm (5 ft 10 in)	82 kg (181 lb)
7	Fatima Airosa	30 April 1987	Point	R	175 cm (5 ft 9 in)	72 kg (159 lb)
8	Elisabete Matos	27 April 1989	Driver	R	163 cm (5 ft 4 in)	60 kg (130 lb)
9	Aurelie Mariani	31 December 1990	Point	R	166 cm (5 ft 5 in)	70 kg (150 lb)
10	Susana Costa	7 June 1990	Point	R	170 cm (5 ft 7 in)	63 kg (139 lb)
11	Ines Braga	28 June 1984	Driver	R	163 cm (5 ft 4 in)	60 kg (130 lb)
12	Naida Mariani	1 November 1987	Wing	R	168 cm (5 ft 6 in)	60 kg (130 lb)
13	Ana Ismael	18 December 1992	Goalkeeper	R	171 cm (5 ft 7 in)	60 kg (130 lb)

== Russia ==
No.	Name	Date of birth	Position	L/R	Height	Weight
1	Anastasia Verkhoglyadova	12 June 1995	Goalkeeper		187 cm (6 ft 2 in)	75 kg (165 lb)
2	Ekaterina Tankeeva	28 June 1989			173 cm (5 ft 8 in)	76 kg (168 lb)
3	Ekaterina Prokofyeva	13 March 1991			174 cm (5 ft 9 in)	69 kg (152 lb)
4	Elvina Karimova	25 March 1994			167 cm (5 ft 6 in)	64 kg (141 lb)
5	Nadezhda Iarondaikina	30 November 1994			170 cm (5 ft 7 in)	65 kg (143 lb)
6	Kseniia Krimer	19 July 1992			187 cm (6 ft 2 in)	89 kg (196 lb)
7	Ekaterina Lisunova	6 October 1989			173 cm (5 ft 8 in)	65 kg (143 lb)
8	Anastasia Simanovich	23 January 1995				
9	Anna Timofeeva	18 July 1987			180 cm (5 ft 11 in)	89 kg (196 lb)
10	Evgeniia Soboleva	26 August 1988			180 cm (5 ft 11 in)	78 kg (172 lb)
11	Evgeniya Ivanova	26 July 1987			176 cm (5 ft 9 in)	65 kg (143 lb)
12	Anna Grineva	31 January 1988			189 cm (6 ft 2 in)	90 kg (200 lb)
13	Anna Karnaukh	31 August 1993	Goalkeeper		176 cm (5 ft 9 in)	63 kg (139 lb)

== Serbia ==
No.	Name	Date of birth	Position	L/R	Height	Weight
1	Vladana Jovetic	23 March 1990	Goalkeeper	R	180 cm (5 ft 11 in)	77 kg (170 lb)
2	Boglarka Rudic	28 August 1991	Wing	R	165 cm (5 ft 5 in)	61 kg (134 lb)
3	Jovana Pantovic	5 February 1993	Wing	R	173 cm (5 ft 8 in)	67 kg (148 lb)
4	Ivana Corovic	20 September 1983	Wing	R	170 cm (5 ft 7 in)	64 kg (141 lb)
5	Kristina Miladinovic	26 July 1997	Wing	R	159 cm (5 ft 3 in)	54 kg (119 lb)
6	Jovana Dujovic	3 August 1990	Wing	R	173 cm (5 ft 8 in)	67 kg (148 lb)
7	Lara Luka	25 November 2000	Driver	R	183 cm (6 ft 0 in)	69 kg (152 lb)
8	Teodora Rudic	2 April 1998	Driver	R	176 cm (5 ft 9 in)	70 kg (150 lb)
9	Jovana Milovanovic	21 May 1992	Wing	R	175 cm (5 ft 9 in)	65 kg (143 lb)
10	Jelena Vukovic	8 February 1994	Wing	R	177 cm (5 ft 10 in)	79 kg (174 lb)
11	Dragana Ivkovic	27 October 1984	Wing	R	171 cm (5 ft 7 in)	58 kg (128 lb)
12	Tijana Jakovljevic	28 July 1991	Driver	R	177 cm (5 ft 10 in)	75 kg (165 lb)
13	Emilija Aleksandrovic	16 December 1997	Goalkeeper	R	182 cm (6 ft 0 in)	68 kg (150 lb)
Head coach: Vladimir Bajković

== Spain ==
No.	Name	Date of birth	Position	L/R	Height	Weight
1	Laura Ester	22 January 1990	Goalkeeper	R	170 cm (5 ft 7 in)	58 kg (128 lb)
2	Marta Bach	17 February 1993	Point	L	175 cm (5 ft 9 in)	69 kg (152 lb)
3	Anna Espar	8 January 1993	Driver	R	180 cm (5 ft 11 in)	67 kg (148 lb)
4	Beatriz Ortiz	21 June 1995	Driver	R	176 cm (5 ft 9 in)	65 kg (143 lb)
5	Matilde Ortiz	16 September 1990	Point	R	174 cm (5 ft 9 in)	67 kg (148 lb)
6	Jennifer Pareja	8 May 1984	Driver	R	175 cm (5 ft 9 in)	63 kg (139 lb)
7	Clara Espar	29 September 1994	Wing	R	177 cm (5 ft 10 in)	70 kg (150 lb)
8	Maria Del Pilar Pena	4 April 1986	Wing	L	174 cm (5 ft 9 in)	61 kg (134 lb)
9	Judith Forca	7 June 1996	Wing	L	173 cm (5 ft 8 in)	66 kg (146 lb)
10	Roser Tarrago	25 March 1993	Driver	R	171 cm (5 ft 7 in)	61 kg (134 lb)
11	Maria Carmen Garcia	17 October 1990	Centre Forward	R	188 cm (6 ft 2 in)	90 kg (200 lb)
12	Laura Lopez	13 January 1988	Driver	R	170 cm (5 ft 7 in)	65 kg (143 lb)
13	Patricia Herrera	9 February 1993	Goalkeeper	R	163 cm (5 ft 4 in)	59 kg (130 lb)

== Turkey ==
No.	Name	Date of birth	Position	L/R	Height	Weight
1	Pelin Ozdemir	21 May 1991	Goalkeeper	R	180 cm (5 ft 11 in)	72 kg (159 lb)
2	Melda Fatma Idrisoglu	31 January 1989	Point	L	165 cm (5 ft 5 in)	57 kg (126 lb)
3	Yonca Sevval Erdem	3 April 1996	Wing	R	167 cm (5 ft 6 in)	58 kg (128 lb)
4	Asli Duman	23 November 1992	Point	R	166 cm (5 ft 5 in)	64 kg (141 lb)
5	Karya Kose	20 January 1997	Wing	R	165 cm (5 ft 5 in)	60 kg (130 lb)
6	Melek Cavlak	6 November 1993	Centre Forward	R	171 cm (5 ft 7 in)	62 kg (137 lb)
7	Aylin Soylemez	8 July 1997	Centre Forward	R	173 cm (5 ft 8 in)	73 kg (161 lb)
8	Yagmur Arzu Elma	19 January 1996	Wing	R	165 cm (5 ft 5 in)	66 kg (146 lb)
9	Reyhan Acar	29 April 1992	Driver	R	170 cm (5 ft 7 in)	58 kg (128 lb)
10	Kubra Kus	9 November 1994	Centre Forward	R	170 cm (5 ft 7 in)	78 kg (172 lb)
11	Damla Deniz Duz	22 August 1995	Wing	R	177 cm (5 ft 10 in)	65 kg (143 lb)
12	Dilara Burali	27 March 2000	Centre Forward	R	188 cm (6 ft 2 in)	70 kg (150 lb)
13	Fatma Eser Ozaydin	21 January 1994	Goalkeeper	L	178 cm (5 ft 10 in)	79 kg (174 lb)
