= Netherlands at the 2023 World Aquatics Championships =

- Flag of the Netherlands
- World Aquatics code: NED
- National federation: Royal Dutch Swimming Federation
- Website: knzb.nl

in Fukuoka, Japan
- Competitors: 40 in 6 sports
- Medals Ranked 15th: Gold 1 Silver 2 Bronze 2 Total 5

World Aquatics Championships appearances
- 1973; 1975; 1978; 1982; 1986; 1991; 1994; 1998; 2001; 2003; 2005; 2007; 2009; 2011; 2013; 2015; 2017; 2019; 2022; 2023; 2024; 2025

The Netherlands competed at the 2023 World Aquatics Championships in Fukuoka, Japan from 14 to 30 July.

== Medalists ==
Medal	Name	Sport	Event	Date
Gold	Netherlands women's national water polo team: Laura Aarts Iris Wolves Brigitte Sleeking Sabrina van der Sloot Maartje Keuning Simone van de Kraats Bente Rogge; Vivian Sevenich Kitty-Lynn Joustra Lieke Rogge Lola Moolhuijzen Nina ten Broek Sarah Buis	Water polo	Women's tournament	July 28
Silver	Sharon van Rouwendaal	Open water swimming	Women's 5 km	July 18
Silver	Arno Kamminga	Swimming	Men's 100 m breaststroke	July 24
Bronze	Marrit Steenbergen	Swimming	Women's 100 m freestyle	July 28
Bronze	Tes Schouten	Swimming	Women's 200 m breaststroke	July 28

== Athletes by discipline ==
The following is the list of number of competitors participating at the Championships per discipline.

Sport	Men	Women	Total
Artistic swimming	0	3	3
Diving	0	3	3
High diving	0	1	1
Open water swimming	0	1	1
Swimming	6	11	17
Water polo	0	15	15
Total	6	34	40

== Artistic swimming ==
The Netherlands entered 3 artistic swimmers.

Women

Athlete	Event	Preliminaries		Final	
Athlete	Event	Points	Rank	Points	Rank
Bregje de Brouwer; Noortje de Brouwer	Duet technical routine	259.9635	4 Q	231.7799	7
Bregje de Brouwer; Marloes Steenbeek	Duet free routine	217.6916	6 Q	206.0396	8

== Diving ==
The Netherlands entered 3 divers.

Women

Athlete	Event	Preliminaries		Semifinals		Final	
Athlete	Event	Points	Rank	Points	Rank	Points	Rank
Else Praasterink	10 m platform	283.65	19	Did not advance			
Celine van Duijn	3 m springboard	214.60	41	Did not advance			
Inge Jansen; Celine van Duijn	3 m synchro springboard	259.80	10 Q	—N/a		264.00	10

== High diving ==
The Netherlands entered 1 high diver.

Women

Athlete	Event	Points	Rank
Ginni van Katwijk	Women's high diving	232.70	11

== Open water swimming ==
The Netherlands entered 1 open water swimmer.

Athlete	Event	Time	Rank
Sharon van Rouwendaal	Women's 5 km	59:32.7	2nd place, silver medalist(s)
Sharon van Rouwendaal	Women's 10 km	2:02:42.4	4

== Swimming ==
The Netherlands entered 17 swimmers.

Men

Athlete	Event	Heat		Semifinal		Final	
Athlete	Event	Time	Rank	Time	Rank	Time	Rank
Caspar Corbeau	50 metre breaststroke	27.15	10 Q	27.21	10	Did not advance	
Caspar Corbeau	200 metre breaststroke	2:09.29	2 Q	2:08.49	5 Q	2:08.42	5
Thom de Boer	50 metre freestyle	22.13	20	Did not advance			
Thomas Jansen	400 metre individual medley	4:16.00	12	—N/a		Did not advance	
Arno Kamminga	100 metre breaststroke	58.71	2 Q	59.08	5 Q	58.72	2nd place, silver medalist(s)
Arno Kamminga	200 metre breaststroke	2:10.47	10 Q	2:10.57	12	Did not advance	
Nyls Korstanje	50 metre butterfly	23.19	8 Q	23.23	12	Did not advance	
Nyls Korstanje	100 metre butterfly	50.78 NR	2 Q	50.98	5 Q	51.05	5
Kenzo Simons	50 metre freestyle	22.04	15 Q	21.92	11	Did not advance	

Women

Athlete	Event	Heat		Semifinal		Final	
Athlete	Event	Time	Rank	Time	Rank	Time	Rank
Kim Busch	50 metre butterfly	26.23	15 Q	26.14	14	Did not advance	
Imani de Jong	400 metre freestyle	4:12.03	21	—N/a		Did not advance	
Imani de Jong	800 metre freestyle	8:50.81	29	—N/a		Did not advance	
Imani de Jong	1500 metre freestyle	16:51.22	25	—N/a		Did not advance	
Maaike de Waard	50 metre backstroke	27.91	10 Q	28.03	12	Did not advance	
Maaike de Waard	100 metre backstroke	59.89	7 Q	59.84	11	Did not advance	
Maaike de Waard	50 metre butterfly	26.17	13 Q	26.02	13	Did not advance	
Tes Schouten	100 metre breaststroke	1:06.46	8 Q	1:06.53	10	Did not advance	
Tes Schouten	200 metre breaststroke	2:22.43	1 Q	2:21.71	2 Q	2:21.63 NR	3rd place, bronze medalist(s)
Marrit Steenbergen	50 metre freestyle	24.63	7 Q	24.68; 24.53	8 S/off; 1 Q	24.61	8
Marrit Steenbergen	100 metre freestyle	53.82	6 Q	52.82	1 Q	52.71	3rd place, bronze medalist(s)
Marrit Steenbergen	200 metre freestyle	1:56.66	5 Q	1:56.49	8 Q	1:55.51	5
Marrit Steenbergen	200 metre individual medley	2:11.31	13 Q	2:09.30	3 Q	2:11.89	7
Kira Toussaint	50 metre backstroke	28.41	21	Did not advance			
Kira Toussaint	100 metre backstroke	1:00.46	15 Q	59.89	12	Did not advance	
Janna van Kooten	200 metre freestyle	1:58.16	15 Q	1:58.12	15	Did not advance	
Valerie van Roon	50 metre freestyle	24.82	12 Q	24.78	14	Did not advance	
Kim Busch; Sam van Nunen; Milou van Wijk; Marrit Steenbergen	4 × 100 m freestyle relay	3:35.50	3 Q	—N/a		3:35.41	6
Janna van Kooten; Imani de Jong; Silke Holkenborg; Marrit Steenbergen	4 × 200 m freestyle relay	7:53.52	5 Q	—N/a		7:52.93	6
Kira Toussaint; Tes Schouten; Kim Busch; Marrit Steenbergen	4 × 100 m medley relay	3:57.81	5 Q	—N/a		3:58.09	7

Mixed

Athlete	Event	Heat		Final	
Athlete	Event	Time	Rank	Time	Rank
Kenzo Simons; Caspar Corbeau; Milou van Wijk; Sam van Nunen	4 × 100 m freestyle relay	3:27.83	12	Did not advance	
Maaike de Waard; Arno Kamminga; Nyls Korstanje; Marrit Steenbergen	4 × 100 m medley relay	3:41.45	3 Q	3:41.81	4

== Water polo ==
Summary

Team	Event	Group stage				Playoff	Quarterfinal	Semifinal	Final / BM	
Team	Event	Opposition Score	Opposition Score	Opposition Score	Rank	Opposition Score	Opposition Score	Opposition Score	Opposition Score	Rank
Netherlands	Women's tournament	Spain; W 7–6	Kazakhstan; W 30–2	Israel; W 24–8	1 Q	—N/a	Canada; W 17–10	Italy; W 9–8	Spain; W 17–16	1st place, gold medalist(s)

=== Women's tournament ===
Team roster

The following is the Dutch roster.

Head coach: Evangelos Doudesis

- 1 Laura Aarts GK
- 2 Iris Wolves FP
- 3 Brigitte Sleeking FP
- 4 Sabrina van der Sloot FP
- 5 Maartje Keuning FP
- 6 Simone van de Kraats FP
- 7 Bente Rogge FP
- 8 Vivian Sevenich FP
- 9 Kitty-Lynn Joustra FP
- 10 Lieke Rogge FP
- 11 Lola Moolhuijzen FP
- 12 Nina ten Broek FP
- 13 Sarah Buis GK
- Marit van der Weijden FP
- Maxine Schaap FP

Group play

Pos	Team	Pld	W	PSW	PSL	L	GF	GA	GD	Pts	Qualification
1	Netherlands	3	3	0	0	0	61	16	+45	9	Quarterfinals
2	Spain	3	2	0	0	1	52	17	+35	6	Playoffs
3	Israel	3	1	0	0	2	30	52	−22	3	Playoffs
4	Kazakhstan	3	0	0	0	3	13	71	−58	0	

Source: Sportresult
Rules for classification: 1) points; 2) head-to-head points; 3) head-to-head goal difference; 4) head-to-head number of goals scored; 5) Goal difference.

16 July 2023; 12:00	Report	Netherlands	7–6	Spain	Marine Messe Fukuoka, Fukuoka; Referees: Alessia Ferrari (ITA), Nenad Peris (CRO)
16 July 2023; 12:00	Report	Score by quarters: 1–2, 1–1, 3–2, 2–1			Marine Messe Fukuoka, Fukuoka; Referees: Alessia Ferrari (ITA), Nenad Peris (CRO)
16 July 2023; 12:00	Report	three players 2	Goals	E. Ruiz 3	Marine Messe Fukuoka, Fukuoka; Referees: Alessia Ferrari (ITA), Nenad Peris (CRO)

18 July 2023; 09:00	Report	Kazakhstan	2–30	Netherlands	Marine Messe Fukuoka, Fukuoka; Referees: Hélène Painchaud (CAN), Germán Moller (ARG)
18 July 2023; 09:00	Report	Score by quarters: 0–10, 1–7, 1–9, 0–4			Marine Messe Fukuoka, Fukuoka; Referees: Hélène Painchaud (CAN), Germán Moller (ARG)
18 July 2023; 09:00	Report	Mirshina, Pochinok 1	Goals	Van de Kraats 8	Marine Messe Fukuoka, Fukuoka; Referees: Hélène Painchaud (CAN), Germán Moller (ARG)

20 July 2023; 20:30	Report	Israel	8–24	Netherlands	Marine Messe Fukuoka, Fukuoka; Referees: Natalia Markopoulou (GRE), David Couper (NZL)
20 July 2023; 20:30	Report	Score by quarters: 1–7, 1–6, 2–5, 4–6			Marine Messe Fukuoka, Fukuoka; Referees: Natalia Markopoulou (GRE), David Couper (NZL)
20 July 2023; 20:30	Report	Futorian 3	Goals	Joustra 5	Marine Messe Fukuoka, Fukuoka; Referees: Natalia Markopoulou (GRE), David Couper (NZL)

Quarterfinals

24 July 2023; 16:30	Report	Netherlands	17–10	Canada	Marine Messe Fukuoka, Fukuoka; Referees: Marta Cabanas (ESP), Natalia Markopoulou (GRE)
24 July 2023; 16:30	Report	Score by quarters: 6–2, 5–3, 3–4, 3–1			Marine Messe Fukuoka, Fukuoka; Referees: Marta Cabanas (ESP), Natalia Markopoulou (GRE)
24 July 2023; 16:30	Report	three players 3	Goals	McKelvey 4	Marine Messe Fukuoka, Fukuoka; Referees: Marta Cabanas (ESP), Natalia Markopoulou (GRE)

Semifinals

26 July 2023; 17:00	Report	Italy	8–9	Netherlands	Marine Messe Fukuoka, Fukuoka; Referees: Sébastien Dervieux (FRA), Nóra Debreceni (HUN)
26 July 2023; 17:00	Report	Score by quarters: 2–4, 3–2, 2–2, 1–1			Marine Messe Fukuoka, Fukuoka; Referees: Sébastien Dervieux (FRA), Nóra Debreceni (HUN)
26 July 2023; 17:00	Report	Marletta 3	Goals	L. Rogge, Wolves 2	Marine Messe Fukuoka, Fukuoka; Referees: Sébastien Dervieux (FRA), Nóra Debreceni (HUN)

Final

28 July 2023; 18:00	Report	Netherlands	17–16 (PSO)	Spain	Marine Messe Fukuoka, Fukuoka; Referees: Nenad Peris (CRO), Alessia Ferrari (ITA)
28 July 2023; 18:00	Report	Score by quarters: 4–3, 2–3, 3–1, 3–5 PSO: 5–4			Marine Messe Fukuoka, Fukuoka; Referees: Nenad Peris (CRO), Alessia Ferrari (ITA)
28 July 2023; 18:00	Report	Van de Kraats, Sleeking 3	Goals	Forca 5	Marine Messe Fukuoka, Fukuoka; Referees: Nenad Peris (CRO), Alessia Ferrari (ITA)
