= Netherlands at the 2017 World Aquatics Championships =

- Flag of the Netherlands
- World Aquatics code: NED
- National federation: Koninklijke Nederlandse Zwembond
- Website: www.knzb.nl

in Budapest, Hungary
- Competitors: 39 in 5 sports
- Medals Ranked 12th: Gold 1 Silver 4 Bronze 1 Total 6

World Aquatics Championships appearances
- 1973; 1975; 1978; 1982; 1986; 1991; 1994; 1998; 2001; 2003; 2005; 2007; 2009; 2011; 2013; 2015; 2017; 2019; 2022; 2023; 2024; 2025

Netherlands is scheduled to compete at the 2017 World Aquatics Championships in Budapest, Hungary from 14 July to 30 July.

== Medalists ==
Medal	Name	Sport	Event	Date
Gold	Ferry Weertman	Open water swimming	Men's 10 km	July 18
Silver	Sharon van Rouwendaal	Open water swimming	Women's 25 km	July 21
Silver	Ranomi Kromowidjojo	Swimming	Women's 50 m butterfly	July 29
Silver	Femke Heemskerk; Ranomi Kromowidjojo; Ben Schwietert; Kyle Stolk; Maud van der Meer*	Swimming	Mixed 4×100 m freestyle relay	July 29
Silver	Ranomi Kromowidjojo	Swimming	Women's 50 m freestyle	July 30
Bronze	Kim Busch; Femke Heemskerk; Ranomi Kromowidjojo; Maud van der Meer	Swimming	Women's 4 × 100 m freestyle relay	July 23

== Diving ==
Netherlands has entered 4 divers (one male and three female).

Men

Athlete	Event	Preliminaries		Semifinals		Final	
Athlete	Event	Points	Rank	Points	Rank	Points	Rank
Joey van Etten	1 m springboard	243.95	48	—N/a		did not advance	
Joey van Etten	3 m springboard	335.10	38	did not advance			

Women

Athlete	Event	Preliminaries		Semifinals		Final	
Athlete	Event	Points	Rank	Points	Rank	Points	Rank
Daphne Wils	1 m springboard	227.90	27	—N/a		did not advance	
Inge Jansen	3 m springboard	307.75	7 Q	303.45	10 Q	307.85	8
Daphne Wils	3 m springboard	264.50	19	did not advance			
Celine van Duijn	10 m platform	285.10	21	did not advance			
Inge Jansen; Daphne Wils	3 m synchronized springboard	258.30	12 Q	—N/a		280.50	8
Inge Jansen; Celine van Duijn	10 m synchronized platform	262.32	13	—N/a		did not advance	

Mixed

Athlete	Event	Final	
Athlete	Event	Points	Rank
Celine van Duijn; Joey van Etten	Team	299.40	15

== Open water swimming ==
The Netherlands has entered three open water swimmers

Athlete	Event	Time	Rank
Marcel Schouten	Men's 10 km	1:52:33.1	18
Marcel Schouten	Men's 25 km	5:04:53.0	9
Ferry Weertman	Men's 10 km	1:51:58.5	1st place, gold medalist(s)
Sharon van Rouwendaal	Women's 5 km	59:11.5	4
Sharon van Rouwendaal	Women's 10 km	2:01:55.5	16
Sharon van Rouwendaal	Women's 25 km	5:22:00.8	2nd place, silver medalist(s)

== Swimming ==
Dutch swimmers have achieved qualifying standards in the following events (up to a maximum of 2 swimmers in each event at the A-standard entry time, and 1 at the B-standard):

Men

Athlete	Event	Heat		Semifinal		Final	
Athlete	Event	Time	Rank	Time	Rank	Time	Rank
Maarten Brzoskowski	400 m freestyle	3:53.17	29	—N/a		did not advance	
Mathys Goosen	50 m butterfly	23.52 NR	13 Q	23.52 =NR	12	did not advance	
Mathys Goosen	100 m butterfly	52.12	17	did not advance			
Arno Kamminga	50 m breaststroke	27.39	=16**	did not advance			
Arno Kamminga	100 m breaststroke	59.95	16 Q	59.76	=13	did not advance	
Arno Kamminga	200 m breaststroke	2:11.00	=15 Q	2:09.94	14	did not advance	
Jesse Puts	50 m freestyle	22.28	21	did not advance			
Ben Schwietert	100 m freestyle	49.41	31	did not advance			
Kyle Stolk	200 m freestyle	1:47.71	21	did not advance			
Ferry Weertman	800 m freestyle	7:56.44	15	—N/a		did not advance	
Stan Pijnenburg; Jesse Puts; Ben Schwietert; Kyle Stolk	4×100 m freestyle relay	3:16.09	10	—N/a		did not advance	
Maarten Brzoskowski; Stan Pijnenburg; Kyle Stolk; Ferry Weertman	4×200 m freestyle relay	7:09.22	4 Q	—N/a		7:12.76	8

* Kamminga tied for sixteenth place, but lost in a three-way swim-off to Slovenia's Peter John Stevens and did not advance.

Women

Athlete	Event	Heat		Semifinal		Final	
Athlete	Event	Time	Rank	Time	Rank	Time	Rank
Marjolein Delno	200 m individual medley	2:15.05	26	did not advance			
Maaike de Waard	50 m backstroke	28.42	=19	did not advance			
Maaike de Waard	50 m butterfly	26.03	14 Q	25.89	12	did not advance	
Femke Heemskerk	200 m freestyle	1:57.06	7 Q	1:56.50	9	did not advance	
Ranomi Kromowidjojo	50 m freestyle	24.53	3 Q	24.20	4 Q	23.85 NR	2nd place, silver medalist(s)
Ranomi Kromowidjojo	100 m freestyle	53.45	6 Q	53.09	7 Q	52.78	5
Ranomi Kromowidjojo	50 m butterfly	25.74	=5 Q	25.67	5 Q	25.38	2nd place, silver medalist(s)
Robin Neumann	200 m freestyle	1:58.66	16 Q	1:58.80	16	did not advance	
Kira Toussaint	50 m backstroke	28.30	17	did not advance			
Kira Toussaint	100 m backstroke	1:00.52	=14 Q	1:00.76	16	did not advance	
Maud van der Meer	100 m freestyle	54.49	=16**	did not advance			
Tamara van Vliet	50 m freestyle	24.94	14 Q	24.72	14	did not advance	
Kim Busch; Femke Heemskerk; Ranomi Kromowidjojo; Maud van der Meer	4×100 m freestyle relay	3:34.26	2 Q	—N/a		3:32.64	3rd place, bronze medalist(s)
Marjolein Delno; Femke Heemskerk; Robin Neumann; Esmee Vermeulen	4×200 m freestyle relay	7:55.16	5 Q	—N/a		7:54.29	7

** Van der Meer tied for sixteenth place, but lost in a swim-off race to Israel's Andrea Murez and did not advance.

Mixed

Athlete	Event	Heat		Final	
Athlete	Event	Time	Rank	Time	Rank
Femke Heemskerk; Ranomi Kromowidjojo; Ben Schwietert; Kyle Stolk; Maud van der Meer*	4×100 m freestyle relay	3:23.89	1 Q	3:21.81 EU	2nd place, silver medalist(s)

== Synchronized swimming ==
Netherlands' synchronized swimming team consisted of 2 athletes (2 female).

Women

Athlete	Event	Preliminaries		Final	
Athlete	Event	Points	Rank	Points	Rank
Bregje de Brouwer; Noortje de Brouwer	Duet technical routine	80.3033	17	did not advance	
Bregje de Brouwer; Noortje de Brouwer	Duet free routine	80.2000	18	did not advance	

== Water polo ==
The Netherlands qualified a women's team.

=== Women's tournament ===
Team roster

- Laura Aarts
- Yasemin Smit (C)
- Dagmar Genee
- Sabrina van der Sloot
- Amarens Genee
- Nomi Stomphorst
- Marloes Nijhuis
- Vivian Sevenich
- Maud Megens
- Ilse Koolhaas
- Lieke Klaassen
- Kitty Joustra
- Deddy Willemsz

Group play

Pos	Team	Pld	W	D	L	GF	GA	GD	Pts	Qualification
1	Hungary (H)	3	3	0	0	54	24	+30	6	Quarterfinals
2	Netherlands	3	2	0	1	45	20	+25	4	Playoffs
3	France	3	1	0	2	16	49	−33	2	Playoffs
4	Japan	3	0	0	3	27	49	−22	0	

Source: Sportresult
Rules for classification: 1) points; 2) head-to-head points; 3) head-to-head goal difference; 4) head-to-head number of goals scored; 5) Goal difference.
(H) Hosts

16 July 2017; 17:30	Report	Netherlands	17–2	France	Alfréd Hajós National Swimming Stadium, Budapest; Referees: Natacha Florestano (BRA), Ni Shiwei (CHN)
16 July 2017; 17:30	Report	Score by quarters: 7–0, 5–0, 3–1, 2–1			Alfréd Hajós National Swimming Stadium, Budapest; Referees: Natacha Florestano (BRA), Ni Shiwei (CHN)
16 July 2017; 17:30	Report	Klaassen 4	Goals	Mahieu, Millot 1	Alfréd Hajós National Swimming Stadium, Budapest; Referees: Natacha Florestano (BRA), Ni Shiwei (CHN)

18 July 2017; 12:10	Report	Japan	8–20	Netherlands	Alfréd Hajós National Swimming Stadium, Budapest; Referees: Mikhail Dykman (CAN), Michael Brooks (NZL)
18 July 2017; 12:10	Report	Score by quarters: 0–7, 5–3, 2–5, 1–5			Alfréd Hajós National Swimming Stadium, Budapest; Referees: Mikhail Dykman (CAN), Michael Brooks (NZL)
18 July 2017; 12:10	Report	Arima 3	Goals	Van der Sloot 6	Alfréd Hajós National Swimming Stadium, Budapest; Referees: Mikhail Dykman (CAN), Michael Brooks (NZL)

20 July 2017; 20:10	Report	Netherlands	8–10	Hungary	Alfréd Hajós National Swimming Stadium, Budapest; Referees: Alessandro Severo (ITA), Steven Rotsart (USA)
20 July 2017; 20:10	Report	Score by quarters: 2–2, 1–1, 2–4, 3–3			Alfréd Hajós National Swimming Stadium, Budapest; Referees: Alessandro Severo (ITA), Steven Rotsart (USA)
20 July 2017; 20:10	Report	Smit 4	Goals	three players 2	Alfréd Hajós National Swimming Stadium, Budapest; Referees: Alessandro Severo (ITA), Steven Rotsart (USA)

Playoffs

22 July 2017; 20:30	Report	Netherlands	10–11	Russia	Alfréd Hajós National Swimming Stadium, Budapest; Referees: Georgios Stavridis (GRE), Daniel Flahive (AUS)
22 July 2017; 20:30	Report	Score by quarters: 2–4, 4–3, 2–3, 2–1			Alfréd Hajós National Swimming Stadium, Budapest; Referees: Georgios Stavridis (GRE), Daniel Flahive (AUS)
22 July 2017; 20:30	Report	Stomphorst 3	Goals	Prokofyeva 3	Alfréd Hajós National Swimming Stadium, Budapest; Referees: Georgios Stavridis (GRE), Daniel Flahive (AUS)

9th–12th place semifinals

24 July 2017; 12:10	Report	New Zealand	4–19	Netherlands	Alfréd Hajós National Swimming Stadium, Budapest; Referees: Diego Garibaldi (ARG), Yosuke Kajiwara (JPN)
24 July 2017; 12:10	Report	Score by quarters: 1–5, 1–6, 1–3, 1–5			Alfréd Hajós National Swimming Stadium, Budapest; Referees: Diego Garibaldi (ARG), Yosuke Kajiwara (JPN)
24 July 2017; 12:10	Report	four players 1	Goals	four players 3	Alfréd Hajós National Swimming Stadium, Budapest; Referees: Diego Garibaldi (ARG), Yosuke Kajiwara (JPN)

Ninth place game

26 July 2017; 12:00	Report	Netherlands	14–7	China	Alfréd Hajós National Swimming Stadium, Budapest; Referees: Natacha Florestano (BRA), Dion Willis (RSA)
26 July 2017; 12:00	Report	Score by quarters: 2–2, 5–2, 2–1, 5–2			Alfréd Hajós National Swimming Stadium, Budapest; Referees: Natacha Florestano (BRA), Dion Willis (RSA)
26 July 2017; 12:00	Report	Nijhuis 4	Goals	three players 2	Alfréd Hajós National Swimming Stadium, Budapest; Referees: Natacha Florestano (BRA), Dion Willis (RSA)
