= Water polo at the 2015 World Aquatics Championships =

Water polo at the 2015 World Aquatics Championships was held between 26 July and 8 August 2015 in Kazan, Russia.

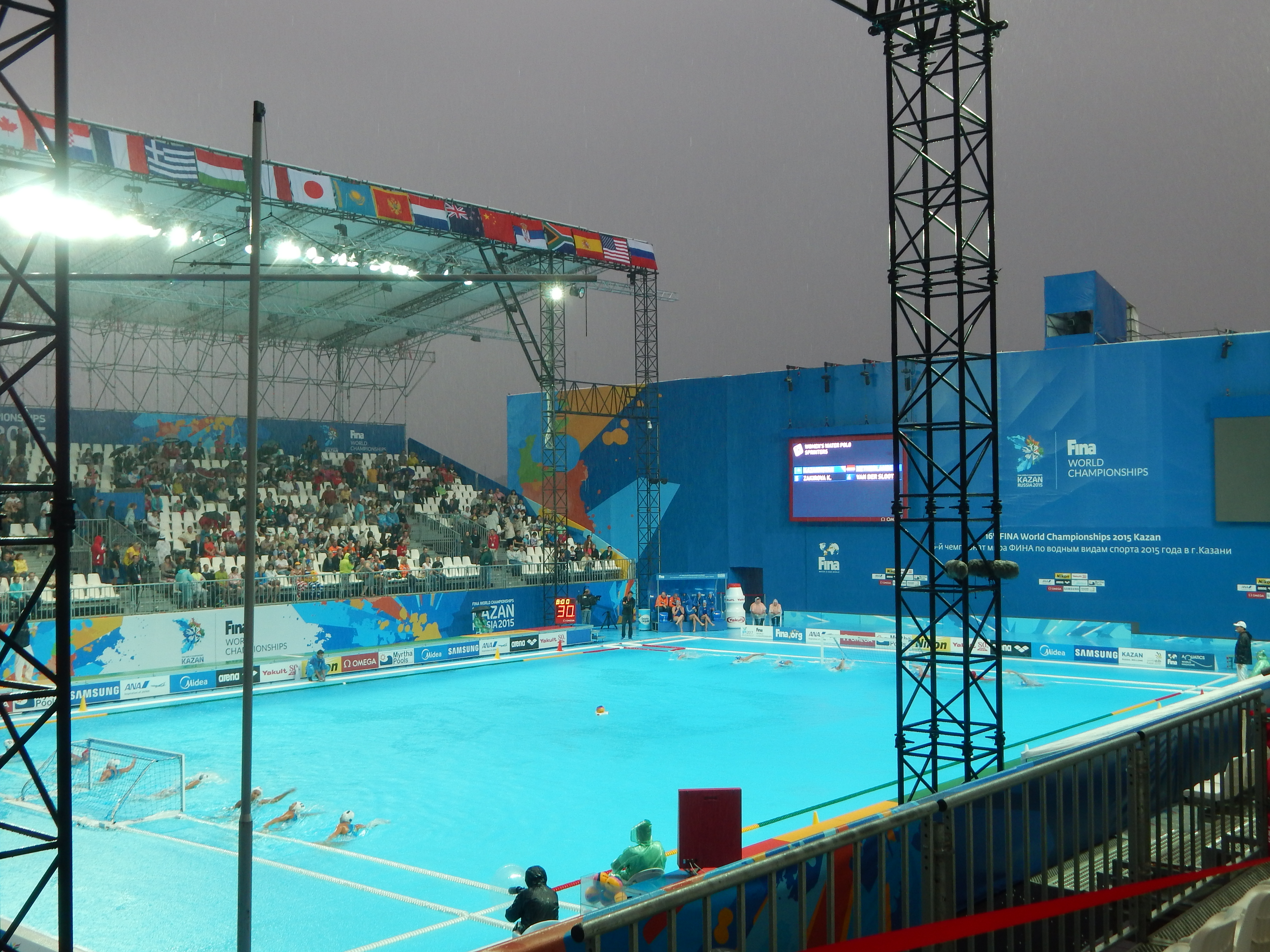
Open arena for water polo

== Schedule ==
Two competitions were held.

All time are local (UTC+3).

Date	Time	Round
26 July 2015	08:30	Preliminary round
27 July 2015	08:30	Preliminary round
28 July 2015	08:30	Preliminary round
29 July 2015	08:30	Preliminary round
30 July 2015	08:30	Preliminary round
31 July 2015	08:30	Preliminary round
1 August 2015	10:50	Play-offs/Placement matches
2 August 2015	10:50	Play-offs/Placement matches
3 August 2015	08:30	Quarterfinals/Placement matches
4 August 2015	08:30	Quarterfinals/Placement matches
5 August 2015	10:50	Semifinals/Placement matches
6 August 2015	10:50	Semifinals/Placement matches
7 August 2015	14:00	Women's finals
8 August 2015	14:00	Men's finals

== Medal summary ==
=== Medal table ===
Rank	Nation	Gold	Silver	Bronze	Total
1	Serbia	1	0	0	1
1	United States	1	0	0	1
3	Croatia	0	1	0	1
3	Netherlands	0	1	0	1
5	Greece	0	0	1	1
5	Italy	0	0	1	1
Totals (6 entries)		2	2	2	6

=== Medal events ===
Event	Gold	Silver	Bronze
Men	Serbia Gojko Pijetlović; Dušan Mandić; Živko Gocić (c); Sava Ranđelović; Miloš Ćuk; Duško Pijetlović; Slobodan Nikić; Milan Aleksić; Nikola Jakšić; Filip Filipović; Andrija Prlainović; Stefan Mitrović; Branislav Mitrović Head coach: Dejan Savić	Croatia Josip Pavić (c); Damir Burić; Antonio Petković; Luka Lončar; Maro Joković; Luka Bukić; Petar Muslim; Andro Bušlje; Sandro Sukno; Fran Paškvalin; Anđelo Šetka; Paulo Obradović; Marko Bijač Head coach: Ivica Tucak	Greece Konstantinos Flegkas; Emmanouil Mylonakis; Georgios Dervisis; Konstantinos Genidounias; Ioannis Fountoulis; Kyriakos Pontikeas; Christos Afroudakis (c); Evangelos Delakas; Konstantinos Mourikis; Christodoulos Kolomvos; Alexandros Gounas; Angelos Vlachopoulos; Stefanos Galanopoulos Head coach: Thodoris Vlachos
Women	United States Kami Craig; Rachel Fattal; Makenzie Fischer; Kaleigh Gilchrist; Ashley Grossman; Samantha Hill; Ashleigh Johnson; Courtney Mathewson; Madeline Musselman; Kiley Neushul; Melissa Seidemann; Margaret Steffens; Alys Williams	Netherlands Laura Aarts; Amarens Genee; Dagmar Genee; Lieke Klaassen; Maud Megens; Marloes Nijhuis; Vivian Sevenich; Yasemin Smit; Nomi Stomphorst; Leonie van der Molen; Sabrina van der Sloot; Isabella van Toorn; Debby Willemsz	Italy Rosaria Aiello; Laura Barzon; Roberta Bianconi; Tania Di Mario; Giulia Emmolo; Teresa Frassinetti; Arianna Garibotti; Giulia Gorlero; Francesca Pomeri; Elisa Queirolo; Federica Radicchi; Chiara Tabani; Laura Teani
