= Netherlands at the 2015 World Aquatics Championships =

- Flag of the Netherlands
- World Aquatics code: NED
- National federation: Koninklijke Nederlandse Zwembond
- Website: www.knzb.nl

in Kazan, Russia
- Competitors: 28 in 4 sports
- Medals Ranked 16th: Gold 0 Silver 8 Bronze 0 Total 8

World Aquatics Championships appearances
- 1973; 1975; 1978; 1982; 1986; 1991; 1994; 1998; 2001; 2003; 2005; 2007; 2009; 2011; 2013; 2015; 2017; 2019; 2022; 2023; 2024; 2025

Netherlands competed at the 2015 World Aquatics Championships in Kazan, Russia, from 24 July to 9 August 2015.

== Medalists ==
Medal	Name	Sport	Event	Date
Silver	Ferry Weertman	Open water swimming	Men's 10 km	July 27
Silver	Sharon van Rouwendaal	Open water swimming	Women's 10 km	July 28
Silver	Marcel Schouten; Sharon van Rouwendaal; Ferry Weertman	Open water swimming	Mixed team	July 30
Silver	Sharon van Rouwendaal	Swimming	Women's 400 m freestyle	August 2
Silver	Femke Heemskerk; Ranomi Kromowidjojo; Marrit Steenbergen; Maud van der Meer	Swimming	Women's 4×100 m freestyle relay	August 2
Silver	Netherlands women's national water polo team: Laura Aarts; Amarens Genee; Dagmar Genee; Lieke Klaassen; Maud Megens; Marloes Nijhuis; Vivian Sevenich; Yasemin Smit; Nomi Stomphorst; Leonie van der Molen; Sabrina van der Sloot; Isabella van Toorn; Debby Willemsz	Water polo	Women's tournament	August 7
Silver	Femke Heemskerk; Ranomi Kromowidjojo; Joost Reijns; Marrit Steenbergen*; Kyle Stolk*; Sebastiaan Verschuren	Swimming	Mixed 4×100 m freestyle relay	August 8
Silver	Ranomi Kromowidjojo	Swimming	Women's 50 m freestyle	August 9

== Diving ==
Dutch divers qualified for the individual spots and the synchronized teams at the World Championships.

Women

Athlete	Event	Preliminaries		Semifinals		Final	
Athlete	Event	Points	Rank	Points	Rank	Points	Rank
Uschi Freitag	1 m springboard	215.75	26	—N/a		Did not advance	
Uschi Freitag	3 m springboard	300.40	10 Q	303.55	9 Q	305.10	9
Inge Jansen	1 m springboard	248.50	9 Q	—N/a		244.10	10
Inge Jansen	3 m springboard	284.40	16 Q	270.60	16	Did not advance	
Celine van Duijn	10 m platform	287.25	28	Did not advance			
Uschi Freitag; Inge Jansen	3 m synchronized springboard	273.60	11 Q	—N/a		276.90	12

== Open water swimming ==
Netherlands fielded a full team of three swimmers to compete in the open water marathon.

Athlete	Event	Time	Rank
Marcel Schouten	Men's 10 km	1:50:52.4	24
Marcel Schouten	Men's 25 km	Did not finish	
Ferry Weertman	Men's 10 km	1:50:00.3	2nd place, silver medalist(s)
Sharon van Rouwendaal	Women's 5 km	58:55.5	4
Sharon van Rouwendaal	Women's 10 km	1:58:06.7	2nd place, silver medalist(s)
Marcel Schouten; Sharon van Rouwendaal; Ferry Weertman	Mixed team	55:31.2	2nd place, silver medalist(s)

== Swimming ==
Dutch swimmers have achieved qualifying standards in the following events (up to a maximum of 2 swimmers in each event at the A-standard entry time, and 1 at the B-standard): Swimmers must qualify at the 2015 KNZB Challenge Cup in Alkmaar (for pool events) to confirm their places for the Worlds.

The Dutch team nominated fifteen swimmers (six men and nine women) to compete at the Worlds, including two-time Olympic champion Ranomi Kromowidjojo in the sprint freestyle events (50 and 100 m).

Men

Athlete	Event	Heat		Semifinal		Final	
Athlete	Event	Time	Rank	Time	Rank	Time	Rank
Maarten Brzoskowski	800 m freestyle	7:54.31	16	—N/a		Did not advance	
Maarten Brzoskowski	1500 m freestyle	15:10.91	15	—N/a		Did not advance	
Kyle Stolk	200 m freestyle	1:48.96	31	Did not advance			
Sebastiaan Verschuren	100 m freestyle	48.61	=7 Q	48.59	12	Did not advance	
Sebastiaan Verschuren	200 m freestyle	1:46.88	8 Q	1:46.43	7 Q	1:45.91	5
Ferry Weertman	400 m freestyle	3:52.18	37	—N/a		Did not advance	
Ferry Weertman	1500 m freestyle	15:32.01	30	—N/a		Did not advance	
Dion Dreesens; Kyle Stolk; Joost Reijns; Sebastiaan Verschuren	4×200 m freestyle relay	7:10.83	6 Q	—N/a		7:09.75	7

Women

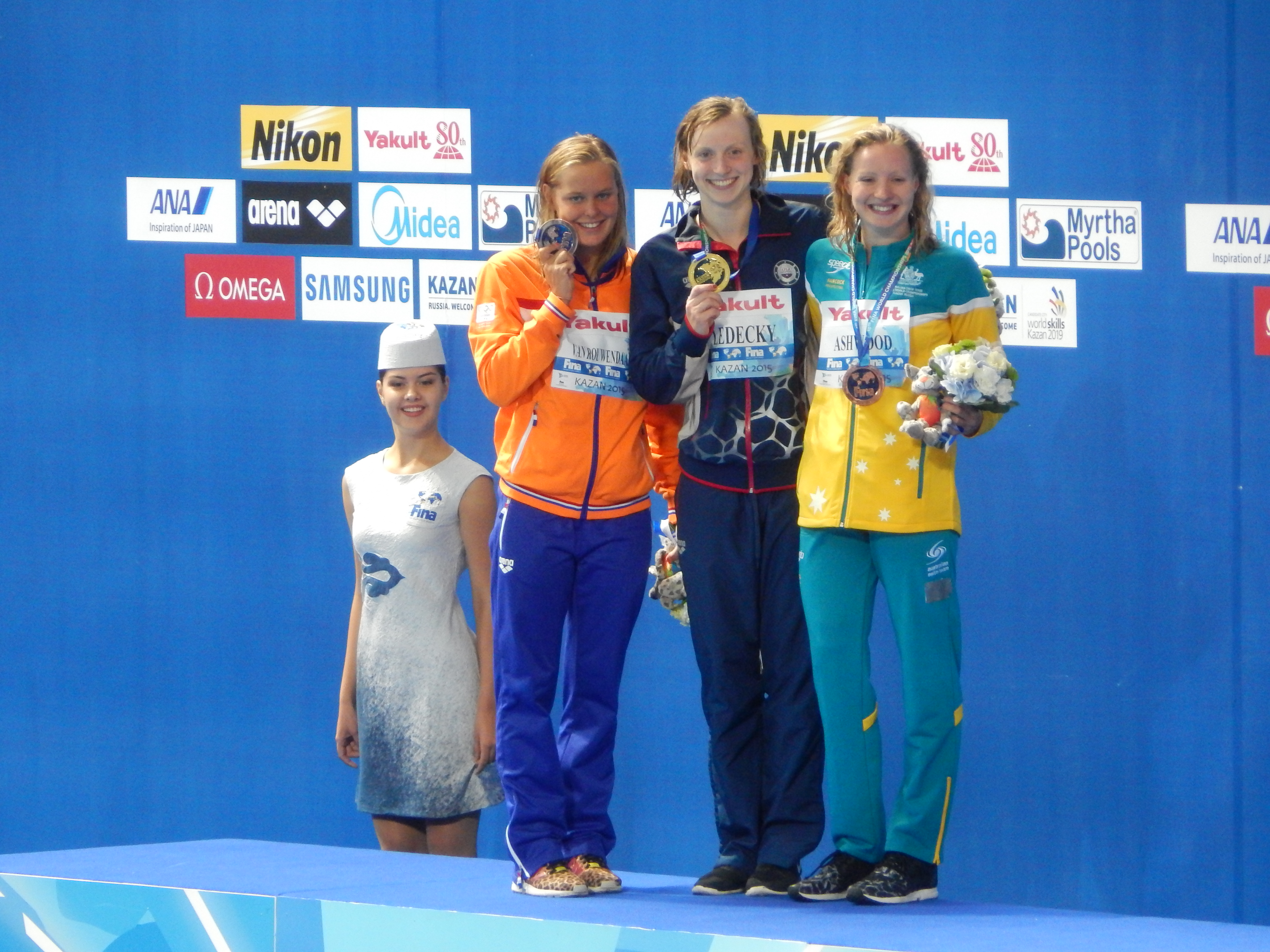
Victory ceremony 400m freestyle

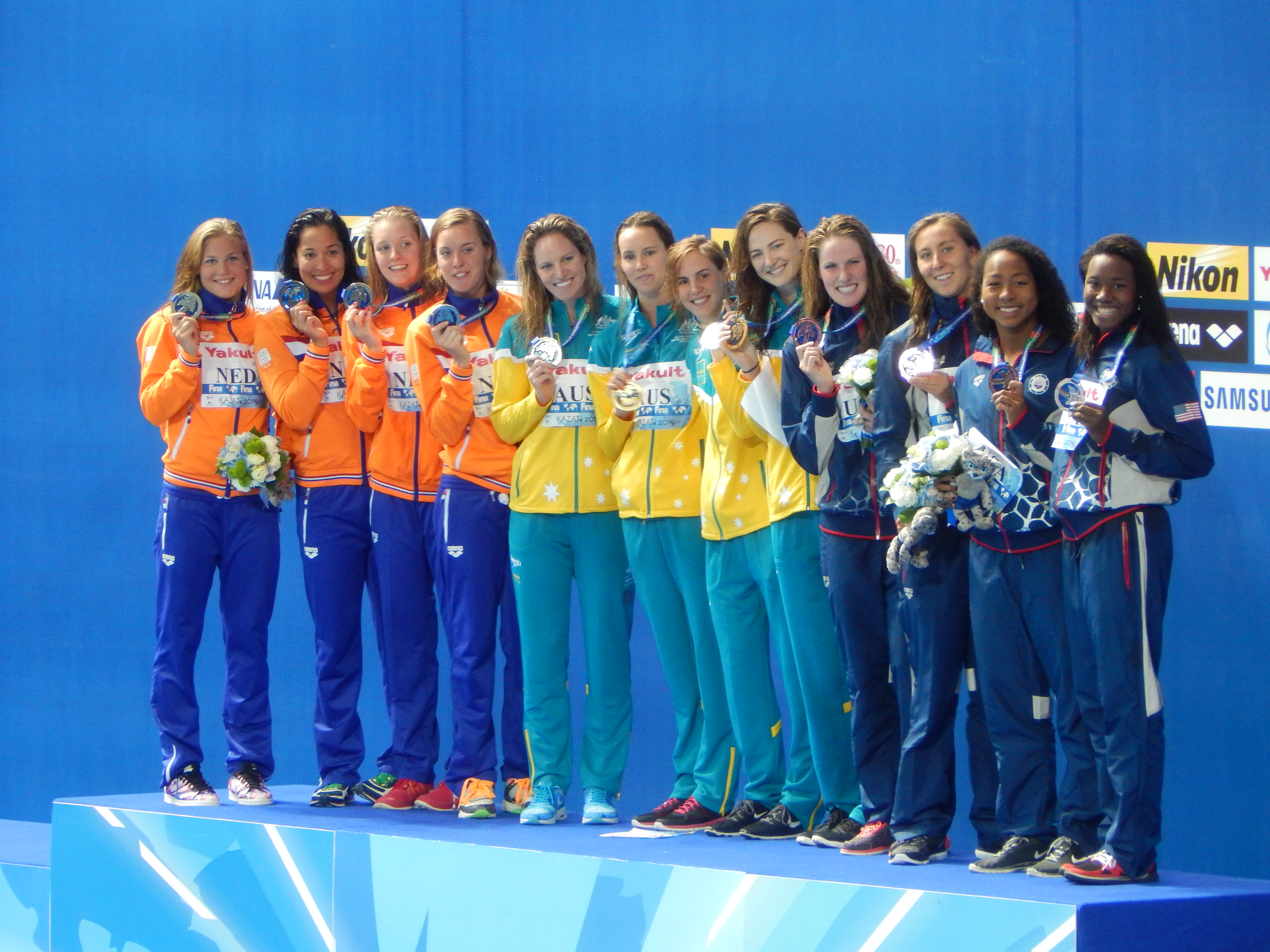
Victory ceremony 4×100 metres freestyle relay

Athlete	Event	Heat		Semifinal		Final	
Athlete	Event	Time	Rank	Time	Rank	Time	Rank
Maaike de Waard	50 m backstroke	28.86	25	Did not advance			
Maaike de Waard	100 m backstroke	1:03.81	43	Did not advance			
Inge Dekker	50 m butterfly	25.66	3 Q	25.90	7 Q	24.64	4
Inge Dekker	100 m butterfly	57.82	3 Q	58.05	=8	Did not advance	
Femke Heemskerk	50 m freestyle	DNS		Did not advance			
Femke Heemskerk	100 m freestyle	53.89	5 Q	53.38	4 Q	53.58	5
Femke Heemskerk	200 m freestyle	1:58.10	9 Q	1:56.91	7 Q	1:56.79	8
Ranomi Kromowidjojo	50 m freestyle	25.64	4 Q	24.23	2 Q	24.22	2nd place, silver medalist(s)
Ranomi Kromowidjojo	100 m freestyle	53.85	4 Q	53.78	5 Q	53.17	4
Moniek Nijhuis	50 m breaststroke	30.81	9 Q	30.99	8 Q	Withdrew	
Moniek Nijhuis	100 m breaststroke	1:08.27	=26	Did not advance			
Sharon van Rouwendaal	400 m freestyle	4:05.02	3 Q	—N/a		4:03.02 NR	2nd place, silver medalist(s)
Sharon van Rouwendaal	800 m freestyle	8:24.83	6 Q	—N/a		8:24.12	8
Sharon van Rouwendaal	1500 m freestyle	16:09.12	7 Q	—N/a		16:03.74	6
Femke Heemskerk; Ranomi Kromowidjojo; Marrit Steenbergen; Maud van der Meer	4×100 m freestyle relay	3:35.91	3 Q	—N/a		3:33.67	2nd place, silver medalist(s)
Sharon van Rouwendaal; Moniek Nijhuis; Inge Dekker; Ranomi Kromowidjojo	4×100 m medley relay	DNS		—N/a		Did not advance	

Mixed

Athlete	Event	Heat		Final	
Athlete	Event	Time	Rank	Time	Rank
Sebastiaan Verschuren; Joost Reijns; Ranomi Kromowidjojo; Femke Heemskerk; Kyle Stolk*; Marrit Steenbergen*	4×100 m freestyle relay	3:26.91	5 Q	3:23.10	2nd place, silver medalist(s)

== Water polo ==
=== Women's tournament ===
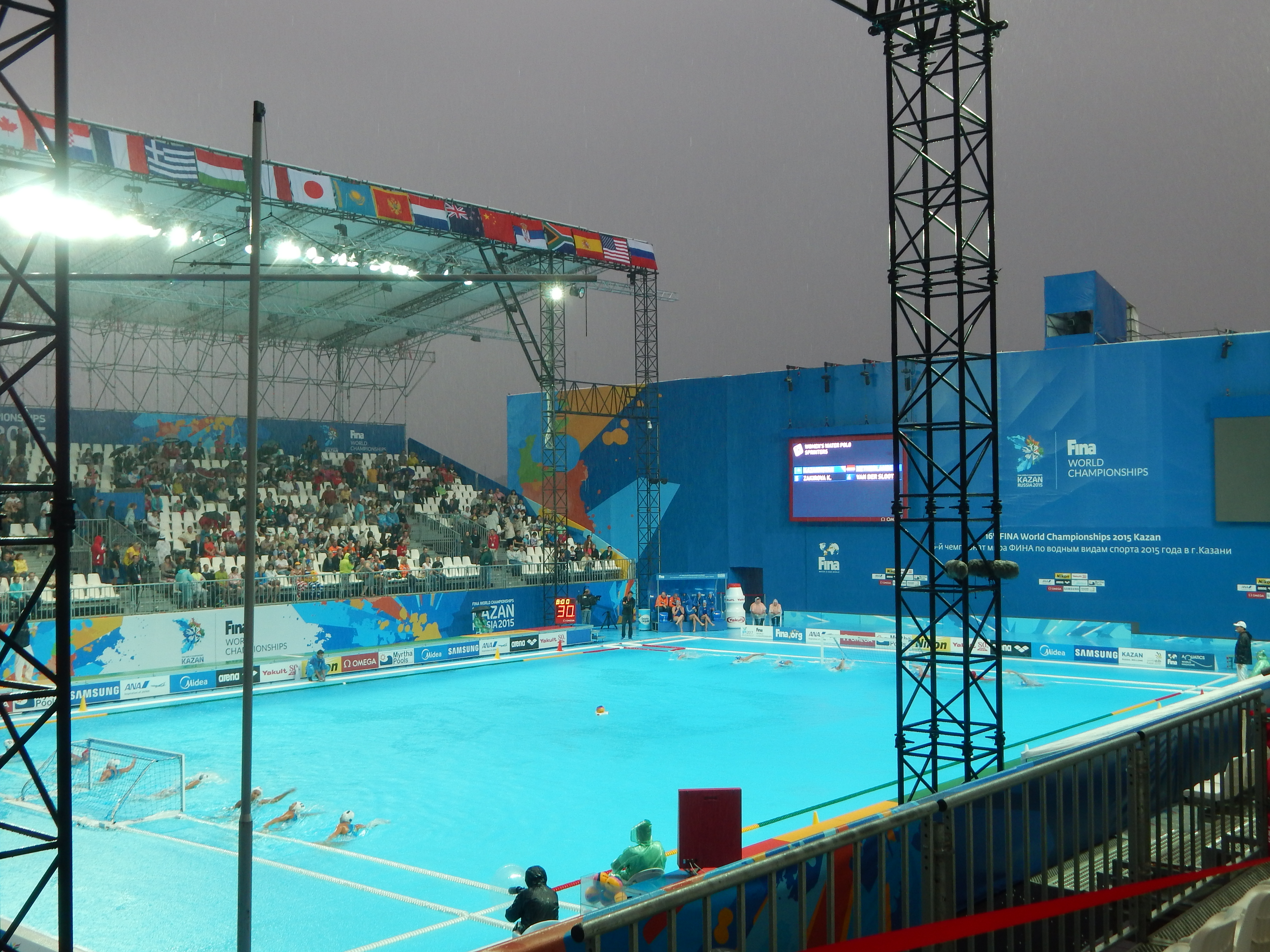
Playoff between the Netherlands and Kazakhstan was held during a rainstorm

Team roster

- Laura Aarts
- Miloushka Smit
- Dagmar Genee
- Sabrina van der Sloot
- Amarens Genee
- Nomi Stomphorst
- Marloes Nijhuis
- Vivian Sevenich
- Maud Megens
- Isabella van Toorn
- Lieke Klaassen
- Leonie van der Molen
- Debby Willemsz

Group play

Pos	Team	Pld	W	D	L	GF	GA	GD	Pts	Qualification
1	Australia	3	3	0	0	35	14	+21	6	Advanced to quarterfinals
2	Netherlands	3	2	0	1	38	18	+20	4	Advanced to playoffs
3	Greece	3	1	0	2	36	22	+14	2	Advanced to playoffs
4	South Africa	3	0	0	3	6	61	−55	0	

Source: SportResult.com
Rules for classification: 1) points; 2) head-to-head points; 3) head-to-head goal difference; 4) head-to-head number of goals scored; 5) goal difference.

26 July 2015; 13:30	Report	South Africa	1–22	Netherlands	Kazan; Attendance: 1,049; Referees: German Moller (ARG), Ursula Wengenroth (SUI)
26 July 2015; 13:30	Report	Score by quarters: 1–6, 0–5, 0–3, 0–8			Kazan; Attendance: 1,049; Referees: German Moller (ARG), Ursula Wengenroth (SUI)
26 July 2015; 13:30	Report	Versfeld 1	Goals	Klaassen 6	Kazan; Attendance: 1,049; Referees: German Moller (ARG), Ursula Wengenroth (SUI)

28 July 2015; 09:30	Report	Netherlands	10–9	Greece	Kazan; Attendance: 280; Referees: Boris Margeta (SLO), Radosław Koryzna (POL)
28 July 2015; 09:30	Report	Score by quarters: 2–3, 2–2, 5–2, 1–2			Kazan; Attendance: 280; Referees: Boris Margeta (SLO), Radosław Koryzna (POL)
28 July 2015; 09:30	Report	Van der Sloot 4	Goals	Plevritou, Roumpesi 2	Kazan; Attendance: 280; Referees: Boris Margeta (SLO), Radosław Koryzna (POL)

30 July 2015; 20:10	Report	Australia	8–6	Netherlands	Kazan; Attendance: 230; Referees: Massimiliano Caputi (ITA), Boris Margeta (SLO)
30 July 2015; 20:10	Report	Score by quarters: 2–0, 2–2, 3–2, 1–2			Kazan; Attendance: 230; Referees: Massimiliano Caputi (ITA), Boris Margeta (SLO)
30 July 2015; 20:10	Report	Southern, Zagame 2	Goals	Sevenich 2	Kazan; Attendance: 230; Referees: Massimiliano Caputi (ITA), Boris Margeta (SLO)

Playoffs

1 August 2015; 17:30	Report	Kazakhstan	1–21	Netherlands	Kazan; Attendance: 2,150; Referees: Joseph Peila (AUS), Cory Williams (NZL)
1 August 2015; 17:30	Report	Score by quarters: 0–4, 0–7, 0–6, 1–4			Kazan; Attendance: 2,150; Referees: Joseph Peila (AUS), Cory Williams (NZL)
1 August 2015; 17:30	Report	Mirshina 1	Goals	Smit 5	Kazan; Attendance: 2,150; Referees: Joseph Peila (AUS), Cory Williams (NZL)

Quarterfinals

3 August 2015; 18:50	Report	Russia	9–10	Netherlands	Kazan; Attendance: 2,319; Referees: Nenad Peris (CRO), Adrian Alexandrescu (ROU)
3 August 2015; 18:50	Report	Score by quarters: 1–4, 4–3, 2–1, 2–2			Kazan; Attendance: 2,319; Referees: Nenad Peris (CRO), Adrian Alexandrescu (ROU)
3 August 2015; 18:50	Report	Ivanova, Karimova 3	Goals	Megens, Klaassen 3	Kazan; Attendance: 2,319; Referees: Nenad Peris (CRO), Adrian Alexandrescu (ROU)

Semifinals

5 August 2015; 22:00	Report	Italy	5–5 (PSO)	Netherlands	Kazan; Attendance: 717; Referees: Sergey Naumov (RUS), Nenad Peris (CRO)
5 August 2015; 22:00	Report	Score by quarters: 0–2, 1–3, 1–0, 3–0 PSO: 4–5			Kazan; Attendance: 717; Referees: Sergey Naumov (RUS), Nenad Peris (CRO)
5 August 2015; 22:00	Report	Radicchi 2	Goals	Megens 4	Kazan; Attendance: 717; Referees: Sergey Naumov (RUS), Nenad Peris (CRO)

Final

7 August 2015; 22:00	Report	United States	5–4	Netherlands	Kazan; Attendance: 2,305; Referees: Sergey Naumov (RUS), Massimiliano Caputi (ITA)
7 August 2015; 22:00	Report	Score by quarters: 0–1, 2–1, 3–1, 0–1			Kazan; Attendance: 2,305; Referees: Sergey Naumov (RUS), Massimiliano Caputi (ITA)
7 August 2015; 22:00	Report	Fattal 2	Goals	Megens 2	Kazan; Attendance: 2,305; Referees: Sergey Naumov (RUS), Massimiliano Caputi (ITA)
