= 2018 Women's European Water Polo Championship =

Tournament details
- Host country: Spain
- Venue: 1 (in 1 host city)
- Dates: 14–27 July
- Teams: 12 (from 1 confederation)

Final positions
- Champions: Netherlands (5th title)
- Runners-up: Greece
- Third place: Spain
- Fourth place: Hungary

Tournament statistics
- Matches played: 44
- Goals scored: 934 (21.23 per match)
- Top scorers: (Spain) Beatriz Ortiz (25 goals)

Awards
- Best player: (Netherlands) Sabrina van der Sloot

The 2018 Women's European Water Polo Championship was held from 14 to 27 July 2018 in Barcelona, Spain.

The Netherlands won their fifth title by defeating Greece 6-4 in the final. Spain captured the bronze medal after a 12-6 win over Hungary.

== Qualification ==
Twelve teams were allowed to the tournament. The qualification was as follows:

- The host nation
- The best five teams from the 2016 European Championships
- Six teams from the qualifiers

Event	Date	Location	Vacancies	Qualified
Host nation	–	–	1	Spain
2016 European Championships	10–22 January 2016	(Serbia) Belgrade	5	Hungary; Netherlands; Italy; Greece; Russia
Qualifiers	4 October 2017 – 3 March 2018	–	6	Turkey; Croatia; Israel; Serbia; Germany; France

== Format ==
The twelve teams were split in two groups with six teams each. The first four teams of each group played each other in the quarterfinals in cross group format, the remaining teams played for places nine to twelve.

== Draw ==
The draw of the tournament took take place on 7 March in Barcelona. The first batch consisted of the teams ranked 1st and 2nd in the 2016 European Championship, the second batch those placed 3rd and 4th, the third batch those placed 5th and 6th. The six remaining teams were placed into the fourth batch.

Pot 1

Hungary
Netherlands

Pot 2

Italy
Spain

Pot 3

Greece
Russia

Pot 4

Turkey	Israel
Germany	Croatia
Serbia	France

== Preliminary round ==
All times are CEST (UTC+2).

=== Group A ===
Pos	Team	Pld	W	D	L	GF	GA	GD	Pts	Qualification
1	Netherlands	5	4	1	0	75	20	+55	13	Quarterfinals
2	Greece	5	4	0	1	63	23	+40	12	Quarterfinals
3	Italy	5	3	1	1	68	21	+47	10	Quarterfinals
4	France	5	2	0	3	38	54	−16	6	Quarterfinals
5	Israel	5	0	1	4	18	73	−55	1	9th place match
6	Croatia	5	0	1	4	19	90	−71	1	11th place match

Source: Wp2018bcn.com
Rules for classification: 1) points; 2) head-to-head points; 3) head-to-head goal difference; 4) head-to-head number of goals scored; 5) goal difference.

14 July 2018; 14:00	Report	Netherlands	21–1	Croatia	Piscines Bernat Picornell, Barcelona; Referees: Marcela Mauss (GER), Massimo Angileri (MLT)
14 July 2018; 14:00	Report	Score by quarters: 6–0, 5–0, 3–1, 7–0			Piscines Bernat Picornell, Barcelona; Referees: Marcela Mauss (GER), Massimo Angileri (MLT)
14 July 2018; 14:00	Report	Van der Sloot 5	Goals	Butić 1	Piscines Bernat Picornell, Barcelona; Referees: Marcela Mauss (GER), Massimo Angileri (MLT)

14 July 2018; 15:30	Report	Israel	2–21	Italy	Piscines Bernat Picornell, Barcelona; Referees: Ursula Wengenroth (SUI), Radosław Koryzna (POL)
14 July 2018; 15:30	Report	Score by quarters: 0–3, 0–6, 1–5, 1–7			Piscines Bernat Picornell, Barcelona; Referees: Ursula Wengenroth (SUI), Radosław Koryzna (POL)
14 July 2018; 15:30	Report	Noy, Strugo 1	Goals	Garibotti 6	Piscines Bernat Picornell, Barcelona; Referees: Ursula Wengenroth (SUI), Radosław Koryzna (POL)

14 July 2018; 20:30	Report	France	5–12	Greece	Piscines Bernat Picornell, Barcelona; Referees: Stanko Ivanovski (MNE), Haldun Toygarli (TUR)
14 July 2018; 20:30	Report	Score by quarters: 1–2, 2–4, 1–3, 1–3			Piscines Bernat Picornell, Barcelona; Referees: Stanko Ivanovski (MNE), Haldun Toygarli (TUR)
14 July 2018; 20:30	Report	Daule 2	Goals	three players 2	Piscines Bernat Picornell, Barcelona; Referees: Stanko Ivanovski (MNE), Haldun Toygarli (TUR)

15 July 2018; 17:00	Report	Israel	2–20	Netherlands	Piscines Bernat Picornell, Barcelona; Referees: Ivan Raković (SRB), Gabriella Várkonyi (HUN)
15 July 2018; 17:00	Report	Score by quarters: 0–8, 0–7, 0–3, 2–2			Piscines Bernat Picornell, Barcelona; Referees: Ivan Raković (SRB), Gabriella Várkonyi (HUN)
15 July 2018; 17:00	Report	Futorian, Tal 1	Goals	four players 3	Piscines Bernat Picornell, Barcelona; Referees: Ivan Raković (SRB), Gabriella Várkonyi (HUN)

15 July 2018; 18:30	Report	Croatia	6–17	France	Piscines Bernat Picornell, Barcelona; Referees: Luis Santos (POR), Marcela Mauss (GER)
15 July 2018; 18:30	Report	Score by quarters: 1–4, 2–2, 1–6, 2–5			Piscines Bernat Picornell, Barcelona; Referees: Luis Santos (POR), Marcela Mauss (GER)
15 July 2018; 18:30	Report	Bukić 2	Goals	Millot 7	Piscines Bernat Picornell, Barcelona; Referees: Luis Santos (POR), Marcela Mauss (GER)

15 July 2018; 20:30	Report	Italy	6–7	Greece	Piscines Bernat Picornell, Barcelona; Referees: Xavier Buch (ESP), Sergey Naumov (RUS)
15 July 2018; 20:30	Report	Score by quarters: 2–3, 2–2, 2–1, 0–1			Piscines Bernat Picornell, Barcelona; Referees: Xavier Buch (ESP), Sergey Naumov (RUS)
15 July 2018; 20:30	Report	Bianconi, Queirolo 2	Goals	Asimaki 2	Piscines Bernat Picornell, Barcelona; Referees: Xavier Buch (ESP), Sergey Naumov (RUS)

17 July 2018; 17:00	Report	Greece	21–2	Croatia	Piscines Bernat Picornell, Barcelona; Referees: Ursula Wengenroth (SUI), Haldun Toygarli (TUR)
17 July 2018; 17:00	Report	Score by quarters: 5–1, 5–1, 5–0, 6–0			Piscines Bernat Picornell, Barcelona; Referees: Ursula Wengenroth (SUI), Haldun Toygarli (TUR)
17 July 2018; 17:00	Report	Asimaki 6	Goals	D. Butić, Lordan 1	Piscines Bernat Picornell, Barcelona; Referees: Ursula Wengenroth (SUI), Haldun Toygarli (TUR)

17 July 2018; 18:30	Report	France	9–5	Israel	Piscines Bernat Picornell, Barcelona; Referees: Massimo Angileri (MLT), Marcela Mauss (GER)
17 July 2018; 18:30	Report	Score by quarters: 3–1, 2–3, 3–0, 1–1			Piscines Bernat Picornell, Barcelona; Referees: Massimo Angileri (MLT), Marcela Mauss (GER)
17 July 2018; 18:30	Report	Valverde 3	Goals	Futorian 3	Piscines Bernat Picornell, Barcelona; Referees: Massimo Angileri (MLT), Marcela Mauss (GER)

17 July 2018; 20:30	Report	Netherlands	6–6	Italy	Piscines Bernat Picornell, Barcelona; Referees: Adrian Alexandrescu (ROU), Matan Schwartz (ISR)
17 July 2018; 20:30	Report	Score by quarters: 1–2, 1–2, 2–0, 2–2			Piscines Bernat Picornell, Barcelona; Referees: Adrian Alexandrescu (ROU), Matan Schwartz (ISR)
17 July 2018; 20:30	Report	Van der Sloot 2	Goals	six players 1	Piscines Bernat Picornell, Barcelona; Referees: Adrian Alexandrescu (ROU), Matan Schwartz (ISR)

19 July 2018; 14:00	Report	Israel	2–16	Greece	Piscines Bernat Picornell, Barcelona; Referees: Marcela Mauss (GER), Haldun Toygarli (TUR)
19 July 2018; 14:00	Report	Score by quarters: 0–4, 1–4, 0–4, 1–4			Piscines Bernat Picornell, Barcelona; Referees: Marcela Mauss (GER), Haldun Toygarli (TUR)
19 July 2018; 14:00	Report	Bogachenko, Futorian 1	Goals	Asimaki 6	Piscines Bernat Picornell, Barcelona; Referees: Marcela Mauss (GER), Haldun Toygarli (TUR)

19 July 2018; 17:00	Report	Italy	24–3	Croatia	Piscines Bernat Picornell, Barcelona; Referees: Ursula Wengenroth (SUI), Martina Kuníková (SVK)
19 July 2018; 17:00	Report	Score by quarters: 7–2, 6–0, 5–0, 6–1			Piscines Bernat Picornell, Barcelona; Referees: Ursula Wengenroth (SUI), Martina Kuníková (SVK)
19 July 2018; 17:00	Report	Emmolo, Palmieri 4	Goals	three players 1	Piscines Bernat Picornell, Barcelona; Referees: Ursula Wengenroth (SUI), Martina Kuníková (SVK)

19 July 2018; 18:30	Report	Netherlands	20–4	France	Piscines Bernat Picornell, Barcelona; Referees: Gabriella Várkonyi (HUN), Ivan Raković (SRB)
19 July 2018; 18:30	Report	Score by quarters: 6–0, 6–2, 3–1, 5–1			Piscines Bernat Picornell, Barcelona; Referees: Gabriella Várkonyi (HUN), Ivan Raković (SRB)
19 July 2018; 18:30	Report	Van der Sloot 4	Goals	Paillat 2	Piscines Bernat Picornell, Barcelona; Referees: Gabriella Várkonyi (HUN), Ivan Raković (SRB)

21 July 2018; 17:00	Report	Israel	7–7	Croatia	Piscines Bernat Picornell, Barcelona; Referees: Marcela Mauss (GER), Xavier Buch (ESP)
21 July 2018; 17:00	Report	Score by quarters: 1–0, 0–1, 2–2, 4–4			Piscines Bernat Picornell, Barcelona; Referees: Marcela Mauss (GER), Xavier Buch (ESP)
21 July 2018; 17:00	Report	Noy 3	Goals	Bukić, Miljković 3	Piscines Bernat Picornell, Barcelona; Referees: Marcela Mauss (GER), Xavier Buch (ESP)

21 July 2018; 18:30	Report	France	3–11	Italy	Piscines Bernat Picornell, Barcelona; Referees: Haldun Toygarli (TUR), Gabriella Várkonyi (HUN)
21 July 2018; 18:30	Report	Score by quarters: 1–3, 1–2, 0–2, 1–4			Piscines Bernat Picornell, Barcelona; Referees: Haldun Toygarli (TUR), Gabriella Várkonyi (HUN)
21 July 2018; 18:30	Report	three players 1	Goals	Garibotti 4	Piscines Bernat Picornell, Barcelona; Referees: Haldun Toygarli (TUR), Gabriella Várkonyi (HUN)

21 July 2018; 20:30	Report	Greece	7–8	Netherlands	Piscines Bernat Picornell, Barcelona; Referees: Boris Margeta (SLO), Nenad Periš (CRO)
21 July 2018; 20:30	Report	Score by quarters: 1–1, 1–1, 3–2, 2–4			Piscines Bernat Picornell, Barcelona; Referees: Boris Margeta (SLO), Nenad Periš (CRO)
21 July 2018; 20:30	Report	Avramidou, Tsoukala 2	Goals	Koolhaas 3	Piscines Bernat Picornell, Barcelona; Referees: Boris Margeta (SLO), Nenad Periš (CRO)

=== Group B ===
Pos	Team	Pld	W	D	L	GF	GA	GD	Pts	Qualification
1	Spain (H)	5	5	0	0	110	26	+84	15	Quarterfinals
2	Hungary	5	4	0	1	98	32	+66	12	Quarterfinals
3	Russia	5	3	0	2	107	31	+76	9	Quarterfinals
4	Germany	5	2	0	3	29	97	−68	6	Quarterfinals
5	Serbia	5	1	0	4	27	91	−64	3	9th place match
6	Turkey	5	0	0	5	26	120	−94	0	11th place match

Source: Wp2018bcn.com
Rules for classification: 1) points; 2) head-to-head points; 3) head-to-head goal difference; 4) head-to-head number of goals scored; 5) goal difference.
(H) Hosts

14 July 2018; 17:00	Report	Russia	35–4	Turkey	Piscines Bernat Picornell, Barcelona; Referees: Diana Dutilh-Dumas (NED), Luis Santos (POR)
14 July 2018; 17:00	Report	Score by quarters: 9–1, 10–2, 10–0, 6–1			Piscines Bernat Picornell, Barcelona; Referees: Diana Dutilh-Dumas (NED), Luis Santos (POR)
14 July 2018; 17:00	Report	Prokofyeva 7	Goals	Kuş 3	Piscines Bernat Picornell, Barcelona; Referees: Diana Dutilh-Dumas (NED), Luis Santos (POR)

14 July 2018; 18:30	Report	Serbia	8–9	Germany	Piscines Bernat Picornell, Barcelona; Referees: Matan Schwartz (ISR), Benjamin Mercier (FRA)
14 July 2018; 18:30	Report	Score by quarters: 3–1, 2–2, 2–4, 1–2			Piscines Bernat Picornell, Barcelona; Referees: Matan Schwartz (ISR), Benjamin Mercier (FRA)
14 July 2018; 18:30	Report	three players 2	Goals	Fry 3	Piscines Bernat Picornell, Barcelona; Referees: Matan Schwartz (ISR), Benjamin Mercier (FRA)

14 July 2018; 22:15	Report	Hungary	9–13	Spain	Piscines Bernat Picornell, Barcelona; Referees: Boris Margeta (SLO), Attilio Paoletti (ITA)
14 July 2018; 22:15	Report	Score by quarters: 2–3, 2–2, 1–3, 4–5			Piscines Bernat Picornell, Barcelona; Referees: Boris Margeta (SLO), Attilio Paoletti (ITA)
14 July 2018; 22:15	Report	Szilágyi 4	Goals	B. Ortiz 6	Piscines Bernat Picornell, Barcelona; Referees: Boris Margeta (SLO), Attilio Paoletti (ITA)

15 July 2018; 14:00	Report	Turkey	5–32	Hungary	Piscines Bernat Picornell, Barcelona; Referees: Irakli Kikalishvili (GEO), Martina Kuníková (SVK)
15 July 2018; 14:00	Report	Score by quarters: 1–8, 1–5, 1–9, 2–10			Piscines Bernat Picornell, Barcelona; Referees: Irakli Kikalishvili (GEO), Martina Kuníková (SVK)
15 July 2018; 14:00	Report	Buralı, Kuş 2	Goals	Parkes 6	Piscines Bernat Picornell, Barcelona; Referees: Irakli Kikalishvili (GEO), Martina Kuníková (SVK)

15 July 2018; 15:30	Report	Serbia	2–27	Russia	Piscines Bernat Picornell, Barcelona; Referees: Nenad Periš (CRO), Ursula Wengenroth (SUI)
15 July 2018; 15:30	Report	Score by quarters: 1–6, 0–9, 1–2, 0–10			Piscines Bernat Picornell, Barcelona; Referees: Nenad Periš (CRO), Ursula Wengenroth (SUI)
15 July 2018; 15:30	Report	Novaković, Pantović 1	Goals	Simanovich 7	Piscines Bernat Picornell, Barcelona; Referees: Nenad Periš (CRO), Ursula Wengenroth (SUI)

15 July 2018; 22:00	Report	Germany	2–27	Spain	Piscines Bernat Picornell, Barcelona; Referees: Adrian Alexandrescu (ROU), Diana Dutilh-Dumas (NED)
15 July 2018; 22:00	Report	Score by quarters: 2–7, 0–7, 0–7, 0–6			Piscines Bernat Picornell, Barcelona; Referees: Adrian Alexandrescu (ROU), Diana Dutilh-Dumas (NED)
15 July 2018; 22:00	Report	Eggert, Vosseberg 1	Goals	three players 5	Piscines Bernat Picornell, Barcelona; Referees: Adrian Alexandrescu (ROU), Diana Dutilh-Dumas (NED)

17 July 2018; 14:00	Report	Russia	27–5	Germany	Piscines Bernat Picornell, Barcelona; Referees: Martina Kuníková (SVK), Luis Santos (POR)
17 July 2018; 14:00	Report	Score by quarters: 5–2, 7–1, 7–1, 8–1			Piscines Bernat Picornell, Barcelona; Referees: Martina Kuníková (SVK), Luis Santos (POR)
17 July 2018; 14:00	Report	three players 4	Goals	five players 1	Piscines Bernat Picornell, Barcelona; Referees: Martina Kuníková (SVK), Luis Santos (POR)

17 July 2018; 15:30	Report	Hungary	23–6	Serbia	Piscines Bernat Picornell, Barcelona; Referees: Irakli Kikalishvili (GEO), Georgios Stavridis (GRE)
17 July 2018; 15:30	Report	Score by quarters: 9–1, 5–1, 5–3, 4–1			Piscines Bernat Picornell, Barcelona; Referees: Irakli Kikalishvili (GEO), Georgios Stavridis (GRE)
17 July 2018; 15:30	Report	Keszthelyi 7	Goals	Jakovljević 2	Piscines Bernat Picornell, Barcelona; Referees: Irakli Kikalishvili (GEO), Georgios Stavridis (GRE)

17 July 2018; 22:00	Report	Spain	32–2	Turkey	Piscines Bernat Picornell, Barcelona; Referees: Benjamin Mercier (FRA), Diana Dutilh-Dumas (NED)
17 July 2018; 22:00	Report	Score by quarters: 5–0, 9–0, 9–1, 9–1			Piscines Bernat Picornell, Barcelona; Referees: Benjamin Mercier (FRA), Diana Dutilh-Dumas (NED)
17 July 2018; 22:00	Report	Forca 7	Goals	Kuş 2	Piscines Bernat Picornell, Barcelona; Referees: Benjamin Mercier (FRA), Diana Dutilh-Dumas (NED)

19 July 2018; 15:30	Report	Germany	12–9	Turkey	Piscines Bernat Picornell, Barcelona; Referees: Diana Dutilh-Dumas (NED), Stanko Ivanovski (MNE)
19 July 2018; 15:30	Report	Score by quarters: 1–1, 6–5, 2–2, 3–1			Piscines Bernat Picornell, Barcelona; Referees: Diana Dutilh-Dumas (NED), Stanko Ivanovski (MNE)
19 July 2018; 15:30	Report	Stiefel 5	Goals	Kuş 4	Piscines Bernat Picornell, Barcelona; Referees: Diana Dutilh-Dumas (NED), Stanko Ivanovski (MNE)

19 July 2018; 20:30	Report	Russia	7–8	Hungary	Piscines Bernat Picornell, Barcelona; Referees: Nenad Periš (CRO), Attilio Paoletti (ITA)
19 July 2018; 20:30	Report	Score by quarters: 2–4, 2–2, 1–0, 2–2			Piscines Bernat Picornell, Barcelona; Referees: Nenad Periš (CRO), Attilio Paoletti (ITA)
19 July 2018; 20:30	Report	Ivanova 2	Goals	Gyöngyösi 2	Piscines Bernat Picornell, Barcelona; Referees: Nenad Periš (CRO), Attilio Paoletti (ITA)

19 July 2018; 22:00	Report	Serbia	2–26	Spain	Piscines Bernat Picornell, Barcelona; Referees: Massimo Angileri (MLT), Luis Santos (POR)
19 July 2018; 22:00	Report	Score by quarters: 1–7, 0–5, 1–5, 0–9			Piscines Bernat Picornell, Barcelona; Referees: Massimo Angileri (MLT), Luis Santos (POR)
19 July 2018; 22:00	Report	Luka 2	Goals	Leitón 5	Piscines Bernat Picornell, Barcelona; Referees: Massimo Angileri (MLT), Luis Santos (POR)

21 July 2018; 14:00	Report	Serbia	9–6	Turkey	Piscines Bernat Picornell, Barcelona; Referees: Stanko Ivanovski (MNE), Ursula Wengenroth (SUI)
21 July 2018; 14:00	Report	Score by quarters: 3–0, 1–0, 2–3, 3–3			Piscines Bernat Picornell, Barcelona; Referees: Stanko Ivanovski (MNE), Ursula Wengenroth (SUI)
21 July 2018; 14:00	Report	three players 2	Goals	Kuş 3	Piscines Bernat Picornell, Barcelona; Referees: Stanko Ivanovski (MNE), Ursula Wengenroth (SUI)

21 July 2018; 15:30	Report	Hungary	26–1	Germany	Piscines Bernat Picornell, Barcelona; Referees: Martina Kuníková (SVK), Diana Dutilh-Dumas (NED)
21 July 2018; 15:30	Report	Score by quarters: 8–0, 7–1, 4–0, 7–0			Piscines Bernat Picornell, Barcelona; Referees: Martina Kuníková (SVK), Diana Dutilh-Dumas (NED)
21 July 2018; 15:30	Report	Gurisatti 5	Goals	Deike 1	Piscines Bernat Picornell, Barcelona; Referees: Martina Kuníková (SVK), Diana Dutilh-Dumas (NED)

21 July 2018; 22:00	Report	Spain	12–11	Russia	Piscines Bernat Picornell, Barcelona; Referees: Adrian Alexandrescu (ROU), Benjamin Mercier (FRA)
21 July 2018; 22:00	Report	Score by quarters: 2–2, 4–3, 2–3, 4–3			Piscines Bernat Picornell, Barcelona; Referees: Adrian Alexandrescu (ROU), Benjamin Mercier (FRA)
21 July 2018; 22:00	Report	García, B. Ortiz 3	Goals	Gorbunova, Serzhantova 3	Piscines Bernat Picornell, Barcelona; Referees: Adrian Alexandrescu (ROU), Benjamin Mercier (FRA)

== Final Round ==
Championship bracket

Quarterfinals
23 July
Netherlands	22
Germany	2
23 July
Italy	9
Hungary	10
23 July
Greece (PSO)	11
Russia	10
23 July
France	5
Spain	14

Semifinals
25 July
Netherlands	8
Hungary	7
25 July
Greece	11
Spain	9

Gold medal match
27 July
Netherlands	6
Greece	4
Bronze medal match
27 July
Hungary	6
Spain	12

5th place bracket

5th–8th place classification
25 July
Germany	2
Italy	17
25 July
Russia	13
France	10

5th place match
27 July
Italy	8
Russia	14
7th place match
27 July
Germany	5
France	13

=== Quarterfinals ===
All times are CEST (UTC+2).

23 July 2018; 17:00	Report	Greece	11–10 (PSO)	Russia	Piscines Bernat Picornell, Barcelona; Referees: Radosław Koryzna (POL), Boris Margeta (SLO)
23 July 2018; 17:00	Report	Score by quarters: 0–1, 2–0, 2–2, 2–3 PSO: 5–4			Piscines Bernat Picornell, Barcelona; Referees: Radosław Koryzna (POL), Boris Margeta (SLO)
23 July 2018; 17:00	Report	Eleftheriadou 3	Goals	Prokofyeva 3	Piscines Bernat Picornell, Barcelona; Referees: Radosław Koryzna (POL), Boris Margeta (SLO)

23 July 2018; 18:30	Report	Italy	9–10	Hungary	Piscines Bernat Picornell, Barcelona; Referees: Benjamin Mercier (FRA), Georgios Stavridis (GRE)
23 July 2018; 18:30	Report	Score by quarters: 3–1, 1–4, 4–1, 1–4			Piscines Bernat Picornell, Barcelona; Referees: Benjamin Mercier (FRA), Georgios Stavridis (GRE)
23 July 2018; 18:30	Report	Garibotti 4	Goals	Keszthelyi 3	Piscines Bernat Picornell, Barcelona; Referees: Benjamin Mercier (FRA), Georgios Stavridis (GRE)

23 July 2018; 20:30	Report	Netherlands	22–2	Germany	Piscines Bernat Picornell, Barcelona; Referees: Sergey Naumov (RUS), Xavier Buch (ESP)
23 July 2018; 20:30	Report	Score by quarters: 6–0, 8–0, 3–1, 5–1			Piscines Bernat Picornell, Barcelona; Referees: Sergey Naumov (RUS), Xavier Buch (ESP)
23 July 2018; 20:30	Report	Megens 6	Goals	Eggert 2	Piscines Bernat Picornell, Barcelona; Referees: Sergey Naumov (RUS), Xavier Buch (ESP)

23 July 2018; 22:00	Report	France	5–14	Spain	Piscines Bernat Picornell, Barcelona; Referees: Adrian Alexandrescu (ROU), Nenad Periš (CRO)
23 July 2018; 22:00	Report	Score by quarters: 2–2, 0–5, 2–3, 1–4			Piscines Bernat Picornell, Barcelona; Referees: Adrian Alexandrescu (ROU), Nenad Periš (CRO)
23 July 2018; 22:00	Report	Daule 2	Goals	B. Ortiz 4	Piscines Bernat Picornell, Barcelona; Referees: Adrian Alexandrescu (ROU), Nenad Periš (CRO)

=== 5th–8th place classification ===
All times are CEST (UTC+2).

25 July 2018; 13:15	Report	Germany	2–17	Italy	Piscines Bernat Picornell, Barcelona; Referees: Martina Kuníková (SVK), Massimo Angileri (MLT)
25 July 2018; 13:15	Report	Score by quarters: 0–4, 0–6, 0–4, 2–3			Piscines Bernat Picornell, Barcelona; Referees: Martina Kuníková (SVK), Massimo Angileri (MLT)
25 July 2018; 13:15	Report	Gelse, Stiefel 1	Goals	Picozzi 3	Piscines Bernat Picornell, Barcelona; Referees: Martina Kuníková (SVK), Massimo Angileri (MLT)

25 July 2018; 14:45	Report	Russia	13–10	France	Piscines Bernat Picornell, Barcelona; Referees: Ivan Raković (SRB), Diana Dutilh-Dumas (NED)
25 July 2018; 14:45	Report	Score by quarters: 4–1, 3–1, 4–5, 2–3			Piscines Bernat Picornell, Barcelona; Referees: Ivan Raković (SRB), Diana Dutilh-Dumas (NED)
25 July 2018; 14:45	Report	Prokofyeva 3	Goals	Bachelier, Daule 3	Piscines Bernat Picornell, Barcelona; Referees: Ivan Raković (SRB), Diana Dutilh-Dumas (NED)

=== Semifinals ===
All times are CEST (UTC+2).

25 July 2018; 17:00	Report	Netherlands	8–7	Hungary	Piscines Bernat Picornell, Barcelona; Referees: Marcela Mauss (GER), Nenad Periš (CRO)
25 July 2018; 17:00	Report	Score by quarters: 2–1, 3–3, 2–1, 1–2			Piscines Bernat Picornell, Barcelona; Referees: Marcela Mauss (GER), Nenad Periš (CRO)
25 July 2018; 17:00	Report	Megens, Van der Sloot 2	Goals	Illés 2	Piscines Bernat Picornell, Barcelona; Referees: Marcela Mauss (GER), Nenad Periš (CRO)

25 July 2018; 18:30	Report	Greece	11–9	Spain	Piscines Bernat Picornell, Barcelona; Referees: Ursula Wengenroth (SUI), Adrian Alexandrescu (ROU)
25 July 2018; 18:30	Report	Score by quarters: 1–1, 4–1, 4–4, 2–3			Piscines Bernat Picornell, Barcelona; Referees: Ursula Wengenroth (SUI), Adrian Alexandrescu (ROU)
25 July 2018; 18:30	Report	E. Plevritou 3	Goals	B. Ortiz 5	Piscines Bernat Picornell, Barcelona; Referees: Ursula Wengenroth (SUI), Adrian Alexandrescu (ROU)

=== 11th place match ===
All times are CEST (UTC+2).

23 July 2018; 13:30	Report	Croatia	11–6	Turkey	Piscines Bernat Picornell, Barcelona; Referees: Ursula Wengenroth (SUI), Massimo Angileri (MLT)
23 July 2018; 13:30	Report	Score by quarters: 2–0, 2–1, 3–1, 4–4			Piscines Bernat Picornell, Barcelona; Referees: Ursula Wengenroth (SUI), Massimo Angileri (MLT)
23 July 2018; 13:30	Report	Lordan 4	Goals	Kuş 3	Piscines Bernat Picornell, Barcelona; Referees: Ursula Wengenroth (SUI), Massimo Angileri (MLT)

=== 9th place match ===
All times are CEST (UTC+2).

23 July 2018; 15:00	Report	Israel	5–6 (PSO)	Serbia	Piscines Bernat Picornell, Barcelona; Referees: Marcela Mauss (GER), Diana Dutilh-Dumas (NED)
23 July 2018; 15:00	Report	Score by quarters: 3–1, 0–2, 1–0, 0–1 PSO: 1–2			Piscines Bernat Picornell, Barcelona; Referees: Marcela Mauss (GER), Diana Dutilh-Dumas (NED)
23 July 2018; 15:00	Report	Strugo 2	Goals	Vuković 3	Piscines Bernat Picornell, Barcelona; Referees: Marcela Mauss (GER), Diana Dutilh-Dumas (NED)

=== 7th place match ===
All times are CEST (UTC+2).

27 July 2018; 16:45	Report	Germany	5–13	France	Piscines Bernat Picornell, Barcelona; Referees: Martina Kuníková (SVK), Stanko Ivanovski (MNE)
27 July 2018; 16:45	Report	Score by quarters: 1–3, 1–1, 2–4, 1–5			Piscines Bernat Picornell, Barcelona; Referees: Martina Kuníková (SVK), Stanko Ivanovski (MNE)
27 July 2018; 16:45	Report	Vosseberg 3	Goals	Millot 5	Piscines Bernat Picornell, Barcelona; Referees: Martina Kuníková (SVK), Stanko Ivanovski (MNE)

=== 5th place match ===
All times are CEST (UTC+2).

27 July 2018; 18:15	Report	Italy	8–14	Russia	Piscines Bernat Picornell, Barcelona; Referees: Diana Dutilh-Dumas (NED), Luis Santos (POR)
27 July 2018; 18:15	Report	Score by quarters: 3–3, 3–5, 1–5, 1–1			Piscines Bernat Picornell, Barcelona; Referees: Diana Dutilh-Dumas (NED), Luis Santos (POR)
27 July 2018; 18:15	Report	three players 2	Goals	Simanovich 4	Piscines Bernat Picornell, Barcelona; Referees: Diana Dutilh-Dumas (NED), Luis Santos (POR)

=== Bronze medal match ===
All times are CEST (UTC+2).

27 July 2018; 20:30	Report	Hungary	6–12	Spain	Piscines Bernat Picornell, Barcelona; Referees: Attilio Paoletti (ITA), Matan Schwartz (ISR)
27 July 2018; 20:30	Report	Score by quarters: 1–5, 2–1, 0–4, 3–2			Piscines Bernat Picornell, Barcelona; Referees: Attilio Paoletti (ITA), Matan Schwartz (ISR)
27 July 2018; 20:30	Report	Keszthelyi, Szilágyi 2 Illés, Garda 1	Goals	Gual 3 A. Espar 2 Bach, B. Ortiz, M.Ortiz, C. Espar, Peña, García, Leitón 1	Piscines Bernat Picornell, Barcelona; Referees: Attilio Paoletti (ITA), Matan Schwartz (ISR)

=== Gold medal match ===
All times are CEST (UTC+2).

27 July 2018; 22:15	Report	Netherlands	6–4	Greece	Piscines Bernat Picornell, Barcelona; Referees: Gabriella Várkonyi (HUN), Nenad Periš (CRO)
27 July 2018; 22:15	Report	Score by quarters: 2–1, 2–2, 1–0, 1–1			Piscines Bernat Picornell, Barcelona; Referees: Gabriella Várkonyi (HUN), Nenad Periš (CRO)
27 July 2018; 22:15	Report	Megens, van der Sloot 2 Genee, Stomphorst 1	Goals	Eleftheriadou, Tsoukala 2	Piscines Bernat Picornell, Barcelona; Referees: Gabriella Várkonyi (HUN), Nenad Periš (CRO)

== Final ranking ==
Rank	Team
Gold medal	Netherlands
Silver medal	Greece
Bronze medal	Spain
4	Hungary
5	Russia
6	Italy
7	France
8	Germany
9	Serbia
10	Israel
11	Croatia
12	Turkey

2018 Women's European Water Polo champion

Netherlands
Fifth title

Team roster

Laura Aarts, Maud Megens, Dagmar Genee (C), Sabrina van der Sloot, Iris Wolves, Nomi Stomphorst, Bente Rogge, Vivian Sevenich, Kitty-Lynn Joustra, Ilse Koolhaas, Rozanne Voorvelt, Brigitte Sleeking, Debby Willemsz. Head coach: Arno Havenga

== Awards and statistics ==
=== Top goalscorers ===
Rank	Name	Team	Goals	Shots	%
1	Beatriz Ortiz	Spain	25	48	52
2	Ekaterina Prokofyeva	Russia	23	46	50
3	Rita Keszthelyi	Hungary	22	47	47
3	Anastasia Simanovich	Russia	22	38	58
5	Arianna Garibotti	Italy	21	43	49
5	Maud Megens	Netherlands	21	52	40
7	Maica García	Spain	20	27	74
7	Sabrina van der Sloot	Netherlands	20	49	41
9	Alexandra Asimaki	Greece	18	36	50
9	Alena Serzhantova	Russia	18	24	75

Source: wp2018bcn.microplustiming.com

=== Top goalkeepers ===
Rank	Name	Team	%	Saves	Shots
1	Ioanna Stamatopoulou	Greece	91	21	23
2	Debby Willemsz	Netherlands	78	21	27
3	Federica Lavi	Italy	75	9	12
4	Laura Aarts	Netherlands	72	64	89
5	Elena Sánchez	Spain	71	15	21
6	Giulia Gorlero	Italy	62	67	109
7	Chrysi Diamantopoulou	Greece	60	61	101
8	Anastasia Verkhoglyadova	Russia	58	19	33
9	Eszter Tóth	Hungary	55	12	22
10	Anna Karnaukh	Russia	51	41	80

Source: wp2018bcn.microplustiming.com

== Individual awards ==
- Most Valuable Player
  - Sabrina van der Sloot (NED)
- Best Goalkeeper
  - Laura Aarts (NED)
- Top Scorer
  - Beatriz Ortiz (ESP) — 25 goals
