= Melda Fatma İdrisoğlu =

Turkish water polo player

Personal information
- Nationality: Turkish
- Born: 31 January 1989 (age 37) Lüleburgaz, Kırklareli Province, Turkey
- Height: 165 cm (65 in)
- Weight: 57 kg (126 lb)

Sport
- Sport: Water polo
- Handedness: Left
- Position: Point
- Current club: Adalar Water Sports Club
- Number: 2
National team
- Years: Team
- 2016: Turkey

Melda Fatma İdrisoğlu (born 31 January 1989), also known as Melda Fatma Derviş after her marriage, is a Turkish female water polo player, playing at the point position. She is part of the Turkey women's national water polo team. She competed at the 2016 Women's European Water Polo Championship. She competed also in half marathon and open water swimming events. She is a physician specialized in Pediatrics.

== Early life ==
Melda Fatma İdrisoğlu was born on 31 January 1989. She is a native of Lüleburgaz in Kırklareli Province She studied Medicine and served after graduation as a research assistant at Istanbul University. She works as a physician specialized in Pediatrics.

== Sports career ==
She is a member of Adalar Water Sports Club playing water poloo. İdrisoğlu competed also at open water swimming in her age category, triathlon and half marathon . At the 2014 International Bozcaada Half Marathon, she placed third in the 10 km event. She became runner-up the Istanbul Sprint Triatlon (Istanbul Triathon and Aquathlon) in 2015. She took part at 2016 Gölcük Nationali Open Water Swim and at the 2016 Kocaeli Open Water Swim, winning the 26-35 age category in both competitions. She participated at the 11th International Arena Aquamasters Open Waters Swimming Championship held in Bodrum in 2019. In 2020, Melda Fatma Derviş took the second place in the women's category of the Istanbul Sprint Triathlon in 2020.
