= Inês Braga =

Portuguese water polo player

Personal information
- Full name: Inês Maria Brito Braga
- Nationality: Portuguese
- Born: 28 June 1984 (age 42)
- Height: 163 cm (64 in)
- Weight: 60 kg (132 lb)

Sport
- Sport: Water polo
- Handedness: Right
- Position: Driver
- Current club: (Italy) CSS Verona
- Number: 7
National team
- Years: Team
- 2016: Portugal

Inês Maria Brito Braga (born 28 June 1984) is a Portuguese female water polo player, playing at the driver position. She is part of the Portugal women's national water polo team. She competed at the 2016 Women's European Water Polo Championship.
