= Géraldine Mahieu =

Hungarian water polo player

Personal information
- Full name: Géraldine Frédérique Mahieu
- Nationality: French / Hungarian
- Born: 15 September 1993 (age 33) Villeneuve-d'Ascq, France
- Height: 186 cm (73 in)

Sport
- Sport: Water polo
Medal record
Women's water polo
Representing Hungary
World Championships
Silver medal – second place	2022 Budapest	Team

Géraldine Mahieu (born 15 September 1993) is a Hungarian water polo player. Born in Villeneuve-d'Ascq, France, she originally competed for the French national team and later switched to the Hungarian national team.

She represented France at the 2013 Summer Universiade, 2014 European Water Polo Championships, 2015 Summer Universiade, 2015 World Aquatics Championships, 2016 European Water Polo Championships, 2017 World Aquatics Championships, 2017 Summer Universiade, 2018 European Water Polo Championships, and 2020 European Water Polo Championships.

Mahieu represented Hungary at the 2022 World Aquatics Championships, 2022 European Water Polo Championships, 2023 World Aquatics Championships, 2024 European Water Polo Championships, 2024 World Aquatics Championships, and 2024 Summer Olympics.
