= Rozanne Voorvelt =

Dutch water polo player (born 2001)

Personal information
- Nationality: Dutch
- Born: 25 April 2001 (age 25)
- Height: 1.77 m (5 ft 10 in)
- Weight: 75 kg (165 lb)

Sport
- Sport: Water polo
- Handedness: Right
- Position: Defender
- Current club: ZVL-1886

Senior clubs
- Years: Team
- ZVL-1886
National team
- Years: Team
- Netherlands
Medal record
Women's water polo
Representing the Netherlands
World Championships
Bronze medal – third place	2022 Budapest	Team
European Championships
Gold medal – first place	2018 Barcelona
World Cup
Silver medal – second place	2023 Long Beach

Rozanne Voorvelt (born 25 April 2001) is a Dutch water polo player for ZVL-1886 and the Dutch national team.

She participated at the 2018 Women's European Water Polo Championship.
