= Bente Rogge =

Dutch water polo player (born 1997)

Personal information
- Nationality: Dutch
- Born: 2 October 1997 (age 29)
- Height: 1.78 m (5 ft 10 in)
- Weight: 72 kg (159 lb)

Sport
- Sport: Water polo
- Handedness: Right
- Position: Defender
- Current club: ZV De Zaan

Senior clubs
- Years: Team
- Arizona State Sun Devils
National team
- Years: Team
- Netherlands
Medal record
Women's water polo
Representing the Netherlands
Olympic Games
Bronze medal – third place	2024 Paris	Team
World Championships
Gold medal – first place	2023 Fukuoka	Team
European Championships
Gold medal – first place	2018 Barcelona
Gold medal – first place	2024 Eindhoven
Gold medal – first place	2026 Funchal
World Cup
Silver medal – second place	2023 Long Beach

Bente Rogge (born 2 October 1997) is a Dutch water polo player for ZV De Zaan and the Dutch national team. She wears cap number 5 while representing the Dutch National Team and cap number 12 for ASU.

She participated at the 2018 Women's European Water Polo Championship.
