= Elisa Queirolo =

Italian water polo player (born 1991)

Personal information
- Nationality: Italian
- Born: 6 March 1991 (age 35)
- Height: 1.68 m (5 ft 6 in)
- Weight: 61 kg (134 lb)

Sport
- Country: Italy
- Sport: Water polo
Medal record
Olympic Games
| Silver medal – second place | 2016 Rio de Janeiro | Team |
World Championships
| Bronze medal – third place | 2015 Kazan | Team |
European Championships
| Gold medal – first place | 2012 Eindhoven |
| Bronze medal – third place | 2016 Belgrade |

Elisa Queirolo (born 6 March 1991) is an Italian water polo player.

She was part of the Italian team winning the bronze medal at the 2015 World Aquatics Championships, where she played in the centre back position. She was part of the Italian team at the 2016 Summer Olympics.

== See also ==
- List of Olympic medalists in water polo (women)
- List of World Aquatics Championships medalists in water polo
