= Sarah Buis =

Dutch water polo player (born 2000)

Personal information
- Nationality: Dutch
- Born: 20 March 2000 (age 26)
- Height: 176 cm (5 ft 9 in)

Sport
- Country: Netherlands
- Sport: Water polo
Medal record
Olympic Games
Bronze medal – third place	2024 Paris	Team

Sarah Buis (born 20 March 2000) is a Dutch water polo player. She represented Netherlands at the 2024 Summer Olympics.
