= Simone van de Kraats =

Dutch water polo player (born 2000)

Personal information
- Nationality: Dutch
- Born: 15 November 2000 (age 25)
- Height: 1.80 m (5 ft 11 in)

Sport
- Country: Netherlands
- Sport: Water polo
Medal record
Olympic Games
Bronze medal – third place	2024 Paris	Team
World Championships
Gold medal – first place	2023 Fukuoka	Team
Bronze medal – third place	2022 Budapest	Team
European Championship
Gold medal – first place	2024 Eindhoven
Gold medal – first place	2026 Funchal
World Cup
Silver medal – second place	2023 Long Beach

Simone van de Kraats (born 15 November 2000) is a Dutch water polo player. She competed in the 2020 Summer Olympics and became the topscorer of the tournament with 28 goals in 7 matches.

She also represented the Netherlands at the 2024 Summer Olympics, winning a bronze medal in the women's tournament.
