= Iris Wolves =

Dutch water polo player (born 1994)

Personal information
- Nationality: Dutch
- Born: 9 May 1994 (age 32)
- Height: 1.80 m (5 ft 11 in)
- Weight: 75 kg (165 lb)

Sport
- Sport: Water polo
- Handedness: Right
- Position: Centre forward
- Current club: Polar Bears
Medal record
Women's water polo
Representing the Netherlands
Olympic Games
Bronze medal – third place	2024 Paris	Team
World Championships
Gold medal – first place	2023 Fukuoka	Team
Bronze medal – third place	2022 Budapest	Team
European Championships
Gold medal – first place	2018 Barcelona
Gold medal – first place	2024 Eindhoven
World Cup
Silver medal – second place	2023 Long Beach

Iris Wolves (born 9 May 1994) is a Dutch water polo player for Polar Bears and the Dutch national team.

She participated at the 2018 Women's European Water Polo Championship.
