= Ilse Koolhaas =

Dutch water polo player (born 1997)

Personal information
- Nationality: Dutch
- Born: 11 June 1997 (age 29) Ouderkerk aan de Amstel, Netherlands
- Height: 1.83 m (6 ft 0 in)
- Weight: 76 kg (168 lb)

Sport
- Sport: Water polo
- Handedness: Right
- Position: Defender
- Current club: AS Orizzonte Catania

Senior clubs
- Years: Team
- –: OZ&PC de Snippen (-2007); HZC De Robben (2007–2011); ZVL Leiden (2011–2016); NC Vouliagmeni (2016–2018); AS Orizzonte Catania (2018–)
National team
- Years: Team
- Netherlands
Medal record
Women's water polo
Representing the Netherlands
World Championships
Bronze medal – third place	2022 Budapest	Team
European Championships
Gold medal – first place	2018 Barcelona

Ilse Koolhaas (born 11 June 1997) is a Dutch water polo player for AS Orizzonte Catania and the Dutch national team.

She participated at the 2018 Women's European Water Polo Championship.
