= Debby Willemsz =

Dutch water polo player (born 1994)

Personal information
- Nationality: Dutch
- Born: 10 May 1994 (age 32)
- Height: 1.77 m (5 ft 10 in)
- Weight: 70 kg (154 lb)

Sport
- Sport: Water polo
- Handedness: Right
- Position: Goalkeeper
- Current club: CN Mataró

Senior clubs
- Years: Team
- CN Mataró
National team
- Years: Team
- Netherlands
Medal record
Women's water polo
Representing the Netherlands
World Championships
Silver medal – second place	2015 Kazan
European Championships
Gold medal – first place	2018 Barcelona

Debby Willemsz (born 10 May 1994) is a Dutch water polo player for CN Mataró and the Dutch national team.

She participated at the 2018 Women's European Water Polo Championship.

== See also ==
- List of World Aquatics Championships medalists in water polo
