= Nina ten Broek =

Dutch water polo player (born 2001)

Personal information
- Full name: Nina Thera ten Broek
- Nationality: Dutch
- Born: 4 July 2001 (age 24)
- Height: 176 cm (5 ft 9 in)

Sport
- Country: Netherlands
- Sport: Water polo
Medal record
Olympic Games
Bronze medal – third place	2024 Paris	Team
European Championship
Gold medal – first place	2024 Eindhoven
Gold medal – first place	2026 Funchal

Nina ten Broek (born 4 July 2001) is a Dutch water polo player. She represented Netherlands at the 2024 Summer Olympics.
