= Kitty-Lynn Joustra =

Dutch water polo player (born 1998)

Kitty Lynn Joustra
Personal information
- Nationality: Dutch
- Born: 11 January 1998 (age 28)
- Height: 1.77 m (5 ft 10 in)

Sport
- Sport: Water polo
- Handedness: Right
- Position: Centre forward
- Current club: California Golden Bears
- Number: 9
National team
- Years: Team
- –: Netherlands
Medal record
Women's water polo
Representing the Netherlands
Olympic Games
Bronze medal – third place	2024 Paris	Team
World Championships
Gold medal – first place	2023 Fukuoka	Team
Bronze medal – third place	2022 Budapest	Team
European Championships
Gold medal – first place	2018 Barcelona
Gold medal – first place	2024 Eindhoven
Gold medal – first place	2026 Funchal
World Cup
Silver medal – second place	2023 Long Beach

Kitty Lynn Joustra (born 11 January 1998) is a Dutch water polo player for the University of California, Berkeley and the Dutch national team.

She participated at the 2018 Women's European Water Polo Championship.
