= Maud Megens =

Dutch water polo player (born 1996)

Personal information
- Nationality: Dutch
- Born: 6 February 1996 (age 30)
- Height: 1.84 m (6 ft 0 in)
- Weight: 71 kg (157 lb)

Sport
- Sport: Water polo
- Handedness: Right
- Position: Field player
- Current club: ALIMOS NAS
National team
- Years: Team
- –: Netherlands
Medal record
Women's water polo
Representing the Netherlands
World Championships
Silver medal – second place	2015 Kazan	Team
European Championships
Gold medal – first place	2018 Barcelona
Silver medal – second place	2016 Belgrade
Silver medal – second place	2014 Budapest

Maud Megens (born 6 February 1996) is a Dutch water polo player.

She was part of the Dutch team winning the silver medal at the 2015 World Aquatics Championships, where she played in the driver position. She is the daughter of former water polo players Hein Megens and Patricia Libregts. Her grandfather is Thijs Libregts.

== College career ==
She plays for University of Southern California. 2018 NCAA winner.

== See also ==
- List of World Aquatics Championships medalists in water polo
