= Nomi Stomphorst =

Dutch water polo player (born 1992)

Personal information
- Full name: Nomi Lisa Stomphorst
- Nationality: Dutch
- Born: 23 August 1992 (age 34)
- Height: 1.72 m (5 ft 8 in)
- Weight: 63 kg (139 lb)

Sport
- Sport: Water polo
- Handedness: Right
- Position: Wing
- Current club: GZC Donk

Senior clubs
- Years: Team
- GZC Donk
National team
- Years: Team
- Netherlands
Medal record
Women's water polo
Representing the Netherlands
World Championships
Silver medal – second place	2015 Kazan
European Championships
Gold medal – first place	2018 Barcelona

Nomi Lisa Stomphorst (born 23 August 1992) is a Dutch water polo player for GZC Donk and the Dutch national team.

She participated at the 2018 Women's European Water Polo Championship.

== See also ==
- List of World Aquatics Championships medalists in water polo
