= Dagmar Genee =

Dutch water polo player (born 1989)

Personal information
- Full name: Dagmar Rixt Genee
- Nationality: Dutch
- Born: 31 January 1989 (age 37)
- Height: 1.78 m (5 ft 10 in)
- Weight: 70 kg (154 lb)

Sport
- Sport: Water polo
- Handedness: Right
- Position: Centre back
- Current club: UZSC Utrecht

Senior clubs
- Years: Team
- UZSC Utrecht
National team
- Years: Team
- Netherlands
Medal record
Women's water polo
Representing the Netherlands
World Championships
Silver medal – second place	2013 Barcelona	Team competition
European Championships
Gold medal – first place	2018 Barcelona	Team competition

Dagmar Rixt Genee (born 31 January 1989) is a Dutch water polo player for UZSC Utrecht and the Dutch national team.

She participated at the 2018 Women's European Water Polo Championship.

== See also ==
- List of World Aquatics Championships medalists in water polo
