= Sabrina van der Sloot =

Dutch water polo player (born 1991)

Personal information
- Full name: Catharina Hendrica van der Sloot
- Nationality: Dutch
- Born: 16 March 1991 (age 35) Gouda, Netherlands
- Height: 1.75 m (5 ft 9 in)
- Weight: 63 kg (139 lb)

Sport
- Sport: Water polo
- Handedness: Right
- Position: Wing
- Current club: GZC Donk

Senior clubs
- Years: Team
- 2005–2013 2013–2016 2016–2017 2017–2019 2019–2020 2020–2024 2024–present: GZC Donk; Szentesi VK; UVSE; AS Orizzonte Catania; UZSC; CN Sabadell; GZC Donk
National team
- Years: Team
- 2009–: Netherlands
Medal record
Women's water polo
Representing the Netherlands
Olympic Games
Bronze medal – third place	2024 Paris	Team
World Championships
Gold medal – first place	2023 Fukuoka	Team
Silver medal – second place	2015 Kazan	Team
Bronze medal – third place	2022 Budapest	Team
European Championships
Gold medal – first place	2018 Barcelona
Gold medal – first place	2024 Eindhoven
Silver medal – second place	2016 Belgrade
Silver medal – second place	2014 Budapest
Bronze medal – third place	2010 Zagreb
World League
Silver medal – second place	2018 Kunshan
Bronze medal – third place	2015 Shanghai
World Cup
Silver medal – second place	2023 Long Beach

Catharina Hendrica "Sabrina" van der Sloot (born 16 March 1991) is a Dutch water polo player for GZC Donk and the Dutch national team.

She participated at the 2009 World Aquatics Championships. After winning the 2018 Women's European Water Polo Championship Sabrina was elected most valuable player of the tournament. She participated at the 2020 Women's European Water Polo Championship.

== See also ==
- List of World Aquatics Championships medalists in water polo

Awards
Preceded by (Spain) Laura Ester	LEN European Water Polo Player of the Year; 2018	Succeeded by (Spain) Laura Ester
