= Laura Aarts =

Dutch water polo player (born 1996)

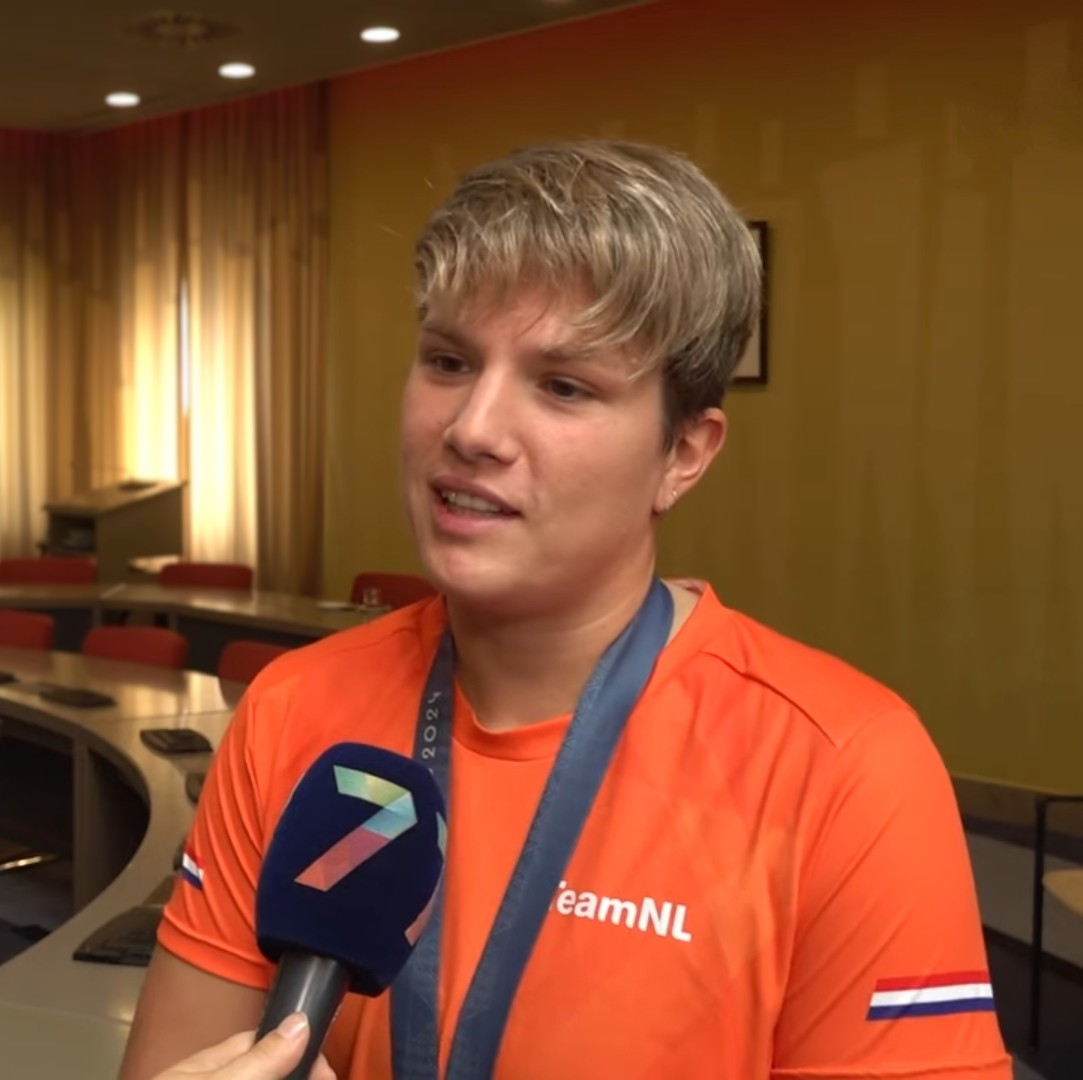
- Aarts in 2024

Personal information
- Full name: Laura Petronella Aarts
- Nationality: Dutch
- Born: 10 August 1996 (age 30)
- Height: 1.75 m (5 ft 9 in)
- Weight: 80 kg (176 lb)

Sport
- Sport: Water polo
- Handedness: Right
- Position: Goalkeeper
- Current club: Dunaújvárosi FVE

Senior clubs
- Years: Team
- Dunaújvárosi FVE
National team
- Years: Team
- Netherlands
Medal record
Women's water polo
Representing the Netherlands
Olympic Games
Bronze medal – third place	2024 Paris	Team
World Championships
Gold medal – first place	2023 Fukuoka	Team
Silver medal – second place	2015 Kazan	Team
Bronze medal – third place	2022 Budapest	Team
European Championships
Gold medal – first place	2018 Barcelona
Gold medal – first place	2024 Eindhoven
Gold medal – first place	2026 Funchal
World Cup
Silver medal – second place	2023 Long Beach

Laura Petronella Aarts (born 10 August 1996) is a Dutch water polo player for Dunaújvárosi FVE and the Dutch national team.

She won the gold medal at the 2018 Women's European Water Polo Championship.

She won the Women's LEN Trophy in 2018 playing for Dunaújváros.

She was one of the sport ambassadors for EuroGames 2022 in Nijmegen.

== See also ==
- List of World Aquatics Championships medalists in water polo
