= Vivian Sevenich =

Dutch water polo player (born 1993)

Personal information
- Nationality: Dutch
- Born: 28 February 1993 (age 33)
- Height: 1.80 m (5 ft 11 in)
- Weight: 80 kg (176 lb)

Sport
- Sport: Water polo
- Handedness: Left
- Position: Centre forward
- Current club: UVSE

Senior clubs
- Years: Team
- UVSE
National team
- Years: Team
- Netherlands
Medal record
Women's water polo
Representing the Netherlands
Olympic Games
Bronze medal – third place	2024 Paris	Team
World Championships
Gold medal – first place	2023 Fukuoka	Team
Bronze medal – third place	2022 Budapest	Team
European Championships
Gold medal – first place	2018 Barcelona
Gold medal – first place	2024 Eindhoven
World Cup
Silver medal – second place	2023 Long Beach

Vivian Sevenich (born 28 February 1993) is a Dutch water polo player for UVSE and the Dutch national team.

She participated at the 2018 Women's European Water Polo Championship.

== See also ==
- List of World Aquatics Championships medalists in water polo
