= Water polo at the 2023 World Aquatics Championships – Women's team rosters =

This article shows the roster of all participating teams at the women's water polo tournament at the 2023 World Aquatics Championships.

== Group A ==
=== Australia ===
The following is the Australian roster.

Head coach: Paul Oberman

- 1 Gabriella Palm GK
- 2 Pascalle Casey FP
- 3 Elle Armit FP
- 4 Bronte Halligan FP
- 5 Bridget Leeson-Smith FP
- 6 Abby Andrews FP
- 7 Charlize Andrews FP
- 8 Amy Ridge FP
- 9 Zoe Arancini FP
- 10 Alice Williams FP
- 11 Matilda Kearns FP
- 12 Tenealle Fasala FP
- 13 Genevieve Longman GK
- Ruby Swadling FP
- Sofie Pontre FP

=== China ===
The following is the Chinese roster.

Head coach: Theocharis Pavlidis

- 1 Zhang Jiaqi GK
- 2 Yan Siya FP
- 3 Yan Jing FP
- 4 Xiong Dunhan FP
- 5 Zhai Ying FP
- 6 Wang Shiyun FP
- 7 Lu Yiwen FP
- 8 Wang Huan FP
- 9 Deng Zewen FP
- 10 Nong Sanfeng FP
- 11 Chen Xiao FP
- 12 Zhang Jing FP
- 13 Dong Wenxin GK
- Wang Xuan FP
- Zhong Qiyun FP

=== France ===
The following is the French roster.

Head coach: Theodoros Lorantos

- 1 Mia Rycraw GK
- 2 Estelle Millot FP
- 3 Valentine Heurtaux FP
- 4 Camelia Bouloukbachi FP
- 5 Louise Guillet FP
- 6 Orsolya Hertzka FP
- 7 Juliette Dhalluin FP
- 8 Aurélie Battu FP
- 9 Erica Hardy FP
- 10 Camille Radosavljevic FP
- 11 Tiziana Raspo FP
- 12 Audrey Daulé FP
- 13 Pasiphaé Martineaud-Peret GK
- Lara Andres FP
- Ema Vernoux FP

=== United States ===
The following is the American roster.

Head coach: Adam Krikorian

- 1 Ashleigh Johnson GK
- 2 Maddie Musselman FP
- 3 Tara Prentice FF
- 4 Rachel Fattal FP
- 5 Jenna Flynn FP
- 6 Maggie Steffens FP
- 7 Jewel Roemer FP
- 8 Ryann Neushul FP
- 9 Emily Ausmus FP
- 10 Kaleigh Gilchrist FP
- 11 Bayley Weber FP
- 12 Jordan Raney FP
- 13 Amanda Longan GK
- Jovana Sekulic FP
- Ellen Woodhead FP

== Group B ==
=== Israel ===
The following is the Israeli roster.

Head coach: Dimitris Mavrotas

- 1 Maria Bogachenko GK
- 2 Yahav Farkash FP
- 3 Hila Futorian FP
- 4 Ronny Gazit FP
- 5 Michal Katz FP
- 6 Veronika Kordonskaia FP
- 7 Tahel Levi FP
- 8 Noga Levinshtein FP
- 9 Noa Markovsky FP
- 10 Dar Menakerman FP
- 11 Dina Namakshtansky FP
- 12 Ayelet Peres FP
- 13 Noa Sasover GK
- Shunit Strugo FP
- Alma Yaacobi FP

=== Kazakhstan ===
The following is the Kazakh roster.

Head coach: Marina Pertseva

- 1 Alexandra Zharkimbayeva GK
- 2 Darya Pochinok FP
- 3 Anastasiya Glukhova FP
- 4 Viktoriya Kaplun FP
- 5 Valeriya Anossova FP
- 6 Madina Rakhmanova FP
- 7 Anna Novikova FP
- 8 Olga Vorontsova FP
- 9 Milena Nabiyeva FP
- 10 Viktoriya Khritankova FP
- 11 Anastassiya Mirshina FP
- 12 Anastassiya Tsoy FP
- 13 Mariya Martynenko GK

=== Netherlands ===
The following is the Dutch roster.

Head coach: Evangelos Doudesis

- 1 Laura Aarts GK
- 2 Iris Wolves FP
- 3 Brigitte Sleeking FP
- 4 Sabrina van der Sloot FP
- 5 Maartje Keuning FP
- 6 Simone van de Kraats FP
- 7 Bente Rogge FP
- 8 Vivian Sevenich FP
- 9 Kitty-Lynn Joustra FP
- 10 Lieke Rogge FP
- 11 Lola Moolhuijzen FP
- 12 Nina ten Broek FP
- 13 Sarah Buis GK
- Marit van der Weijden FP
- Maxine Schaap FP

=== Spain ===
The following is the Spanish roster.

Head coach: Miki Oca

- 1 Laura Ester GK
- 2 Cristina Nogué FP
- 3 Anni Espar FP
- 4 Beatriz Ortiz FP
- 5 Nona Pérez FP
- 6 Paula Crespí FP
- 7 Elena Ruiz FP
- 8 Pili Peña FP
- 9 Judith Forca FP
- 10 Paula Camús FP
- 11 Maica García Godoy FP
- 12 Paula Leitón FP
- 13 Martina Terré GK
- Ariadna Ruiz FP

== Group C ==
=== Argentina ===
The following is the Argentine roster.

Head coach: Guillermo Setti

- 1 Nahir Stegmayer GK
- 2 Lucía Ruiz FP
- 3 Cecilia Leonard FP
- 4 Ashley Hatcher FP
- 5 Ludmila Ianni FP
- 6 Magalí Bacigalupo FP
- 7 Julieta Auliel FP
- 8 Carla Comba FP
- 9 Isabel Riley FP
- 10 Ana Agnesina FP
- 11 Anahí Bacigalupo FP
- 12 María Canda FP
- 13 Aldana Videberrigain GK

=== Greece ===
The following is the Greek roster.

Head coach: Alexia Kammenou

- 1 Chrysi Diamantopoulou GK
- 2 Eleftheria Plevritou FP
- 3 Ioanna Chydirioti FP
- 4 Nikoleta Eleftheriadou FP
- 5 Margarita Plevritou FP
- 6 Eleni Xenaki FP
- 7 Eirini Ninou FP
- 8 Foteini Tricha FP
- 9 Christina Siouti FP
- 10 Vasiliki Plevritou FP
- 11 Eleftheria Fountotou FP
- 12 Maria Myriokefalitaki FP
- 13 Ioanna Stamatopoulou GK
- Eleni Elliniadi FP
- Athina Giannopoulou FP

=== Italy ===
The following is the Italian roster.

Head coach: Carlo Silipo

- 1 Giuseppina Condorelli GK
- 2 Chiara Tabani FP
- 3 Giuditta Galardi FP
- 4 Silvia Avegno FP
- 5 Sofia Giustini FP
- 6 Dafne Bettini FP
- 7 Domitilla Picozzi FP
- 8 Roberta Bianconi FP
- 9 Valeria Palmieri FP
- 10 Claudia Marletta FP
- 11 Agnese Cocchiere FP
- 12 Giulia Viacava FP
- 13 Caterina Banchelli GK
- Lucrezia Cergol FP
- Veronica Gant FP

=== South Africa ===
The following is the South African roster.

Head coach: Nicola Barrett

- 1 Meghan Maartens GK
- 2 Tumi Macdonell FP
- 3 Annie Thornton-Dibb FP
- 4 Boati Motau FP
- 5 Megan Sileno FP
- 6 Hanna Muller FP
- 7 Shakira January FP
- 8 Esihle Zondo FP
- 9 Ruby Versfeld FP
- 10 Nicola Macleod FP
- 11 Chloe Meecham FP
- 12 Kelsey White FP
- 13 Olufunke Gando GK

== Group D ==
=== Canada ===
The following is the Canadian roster.

Head coach: David Paradelo

- 1 Jessica Gaudreault GK
- 2 Marilia Mimides FP
- 3 Axelle Crevier FP
- 4 Emma Wright FP
- 5 Daphné Guèvremont FP
- 6 Blaire McDowell FP
- 7 Verica Bakoc FP
- 8 Elyse Lemay-Lavoie FP
- 9 Hayley McKelvey FP
- 10 Serena Browne FP
- 11 Kindred Paul FP
- 12 Shae La Roche FP
- 13 Rachael Jaffe GK
- Floranne Carroll FP

=== Hungary ===
The following is the Hungarian roster.

Head coach: Attila Bíró

- 1 Alda Magyari GK
- 2 Dorottya Szilágyi FP
- 3 Vanda Vályi FP
- 4 Gréta Gurisatti FP
- 5 Géraldine Mahieu FP
- 6 Rebecca Parkes FP
- 7 Zsuzsanna Máté FP
- 8 Rita Keszthelyi FP
- 9 Dóra Leimeter FP
- 10 Natasa Rybanska FP
- 11 Kamilla Faragó FP
- 12 Krisztina Garda FP
- 13 Boglárka Neszmély GK
- Kata Hajdú FP
- Dalma Dömsödi FP

=== Japan ===
The following is the Japanese roster.

Head coach: Yoji Omoto

- 1 Minami Shioya GK
- 2 Yumi Arima FP
- 3 Akari Inaba FP
- 4 Eruna Ura FP
- 5 Kako Kawaguchi FP
- 6 Hikaru Shitara FP
- 7 Ai Sunabe FP
- 8 Eri Kitamura FP
- 9 Yuka Yamai FP
- 10 Fuka Nishiyama FP
- 11 Momoe Inoue FP
- 12 Kyoko Kudo FP
- 13 Yuka Kawatashiro GK
- Manami Noda FP
- Kiyoka Goto FP

=== New Zealand ===
The following is the New Zealand roster.

Head coach: Angela Winstanley-Smith

- 1 Jessica Milicich GK
- 2 Emily Nicholson FP
- 3 Bernadette Doyle FP
- 4 Libby Gault FP
- 5 Gabrielle Milicich FP
- 6 Aggie Weston FP
- 7 Emmerson Houghton FP
- 8 Katie McKenty FP
- 9 Sophie Shorter-Robinson FP
- 10 Gabriella MacDonald FP
- 11 Kaitlin Howarth FP
- 12 Millie Quin FP
- 13 Samantha Bright GK
- Isabelle Jackson FP
