= Water polo at the 2024 Summer Olympics – Women's team rosters =

These are the rosters of all participating teams at the women's water polo tournament at the 2024 Summer Olympics in Paris. The twelve national teams were required to submit squads of 12 players. Additionally, teams could name one reserve player.

== Group A ==
=== Australia ===
The roster was announced on 9 May 2024.

Head coach: Rebecca Rippon

- 1 Gabriella Palm GK
- 2 Keesja Gofers D
- 3 Elle Armit CB
- 4 Bronte Halligan D
- 5 Sienna Green CB
- 6 Abby Andrews W
- 7 Charlize Andrews D
- 8 Sienna Hearn D
- 9 Zoe Arancini (c) D
- 10 Alice Williams D
- 11 Matilda Kearns CF
- 12 Danijela Jackovich CF
- 13 Genevieve Longman GK

=== Canada ===
The roster was announced on 4 July 2024.

Head coach: David Paradelo

- 1 Jessica Gaudreault GK
- 2 Rae Lekness CF
- 3 Axelle Crevier D
- 4 Emma Wright (c) D
- 5 Marilia Mimides D
- 6 Blaire McDowell D
- 7 Verica Bakoc D
- 8 Elyse Lemay-Lavoie CF
- 9 Hayley McKelvey D
- 10 Serena Browne CB
- 11 Kindred Paul CB
- 12 Shae La Roche D
- 13 Clara Vulpisi GK

=== China ===
The roster was announced on 13 July 2024.

Head coach: Juan Jané

- 1 Deng Zewen GK
- 2 Yan Siya D
- 3 Yan Jing CF
- 4 Xiong Dunhan CF
- 5 Zhong Qiyun W
- 6 Wang Xuan CB
- 7 Lu Yiwen W
- 8 Wang Huan W
- 9 Dong Wenxin D
- 10 Nong Sanfeng CB
- 11 Chen Xiao CF
- 12 Zhang Jing (c) D
- 13 Shen Yineng GK

=== Hungary ===
The roster was announced on 6 July 2024.

Head coach: Attila Mihók

- 1 Alda Magyari GK
- 2 Dorottya Szilágyi W
- 3 Vanda Vályi W
- 4 Gréta Gurisatti W
- 5 Geraldine Mahieu CF
- 6 Rebecca Parkes CF
- 7 Brigitta Horváth W
- 8 Rita Keszthelyi (c) D
- 9 Dóra Leimeter W
- 10 Natasa Rybanska CB
- 11 Kamilla Faragó W
- 12 Krisztina Garda CB
- 13 Boglárka Neszmély GK

=== Netherlands ===
The roster was announced on 19 June 2024.

Head coach: (Greece) Evangelos Doudesis

- 1 Laura Aarts GK
- 2 Iris Wolves CF
- 3 Brigitte Sleeking D
- 4 Sabrina van der Sloot (c) D
- 5 Maartje Keuning W
- 6 Simone van de Kraats W
- 7 Bente Rogge CB
- 8 Vivian Sevenich CF
- 9 Kitty-Lynn Joustra CF
- 10 Lieke Rogge D
- 11 Lola Moolhuijzen D
- 12 Nina ten Broek CB
- 13 Sarah Buis GK

== Group B ==
=== France ===
The roster was announced on 8 July 2024.

Head coach: Émilien Bugeaud

- 1 Mia Rycraw GK
- 2 Lara Andres W
- 3 Valentine Heurtaux D
- 4 Camélia Bouloukbachi CB
- 5 Louise Guillet (c) D
- 6 Orsolya Hertzka D
- 7 Juliette Dhalluin D
- 8 Aurélie Battu CF
- 9 Ema Vernoux D
- 10 Camille Radosavljevic CB
- 11 Tiziana Raspo CF
- 12 Audrey Daule W
- 13 Pasiphaé Martineaud-Perret GK

=== Greece ===
The roster was announced on 4 July 2024.

Head coach: Alexia Kammenou

- 1 Chrysi Diamantopoulou GK
- 2 Eleftheria Plevritou D
- 3 Ioanna Chydirioti W
- 4 Nikoleta Eleftheriadou W
- 5 Margarita Plevritou (c) CB
- 6 Eleni Xenaki CF
- 7 Alexandra Asimaki CF
- 8 Maria Patra CB
- 9 Eirini Ninou D
- 10 Vasiliki Plevritou D
- 11 Athina Giannopoulou D
- 12 Maria Myriokefalitaki CF
- 13 Ioanna Stamatopoulou GK

=== Italy ===
The roster was announced on 11 July 2024.

Head coach: Carlo Silipo

- 1 Aurora Condorelli GK
- 2 Chiara Tabani CB
- 3 Giuditta Galardi CF
- 4 Silvia Avegno W
- 5 Sofia Giustini W
- 6 Dafne Bettini W
- 7 Domitilla Picozzi W
- 8 Roberta Bianconi W
- 9 Valeria Palmieri (c) CF
- 10 Claudia Marletta W
- 11 Agnese Cocchiere CF
- 12 Giulia Viacava CB
- 13 Caterina Banchelli GK

=== Spain ===
The roster was announced on 8 July 2024.

Head coach: Miki Oca

- 1 Laura Ester GK
- 2 Isabel Piralkova D
- 3 Anni Espar D
- 4 Beatriz Ortiz D
- 5 Nona Pérez D
- 6 Paula Crespí CB
- 7 Elena Ruiz D
- 8 Pili Peña (c) W
- 9 Judith Forca W
- 10 Paula Camus CB
- 11 Maica García Godoy CF
- 12 Paula Leitón CF
- 13 Martina Terré GK

=== United States ===
The squad was announced on 30 May 2024.

Head coach: Adam Krikorian

No.	Player	Pos.	L/R	Height	Weight	Date of birth (age)	Apps	OG/ Goals	Club	Ref
1	Ashleigh Johnson	GK	R	1.85 m (6 ft 1 in)	81 kg (179 lb)	12 September 1994 (aged 29)			(United States) NYAC	
2	Maddie Musselman	AT	R	1.80 m (5 ft 11 in)	65 kg (143 lb)	16 June 1998 (aged 26)			(United States) NYAC	
3	Tara Prentice	CF	R	1.83 m (6 ft 0 in)		20 December 1997 (aged 26)			(United States) NYAC	
4	Rachel Fattal	AT	R	1.73 m (5 ft 8 in)	65 kg (143 lb)	10 December 1993 (aged 30)			(United States) NYAC	
5	Jenna Flynn	D	R	1.73 m (5 ft 8 in)		11 June 2004 (aged 20)			(United States) NYAC	
6	Maggie Steffens (C)	AT	R	1.73 m (5 ft 8 in)	74 kg (163 lb)	4 June 1993 (aged 31)			(United States) NYAC	
7	Jordan Raney	DF	R	1.78 m (5 ft 10 in)		2 June 1996 (aged 28)			(United States) NYAC	
8	Ryann Neushul	AT	R	1.71 m (5 ft 7 in)		30 December 1999 (aged 24)			(United States) NYAC	
9	Jewel Roemer	D	R	1.67 m (5 ft 6 in)		8 February 2002 (aged 22)			(United States) 680 Water Polo	
10	Kaleigh Gilchrist	AT	R	1.75 m (5 ft 9 in)	77 kg (170 lb)	16 May 1992 (aged 32)			(United States) NYAC	
11	Emily Ausmus	AT	R	1.75 m (5 ft 9 in)		12 December 2005 (aged 18)			(United States) NYAC	
12	Jovana Sekulic	CF	R	1.83 m (6 ft 0 in)		7 November 2002 (aged 21)			(United States) NYAC	
13	Amanda Longan	GK	R	1.88 m (6 ft 2 in)		16 January 1997 (aged 27)			(United States) NYAC	

== See also ==
- Water polo at the 2024 Summer Olympics – Men's team rosters
