= Gabriella Palm =

Australian water polo player

Personal information
- Full name: Gabriella Catherine Palm
- Nickname: Gabi
- Born: 20 May 1998 (age 28) South Brisbane, Queensland, Australia
- Home town: Brisbane, Queensland, Australia
- Education: Brisbane Girls Grammar School; University of Queensland
- Height: 1.82 m (6 ft 0 in)

Sport
- Country: Australia
- Sport: Water polo
- Club: Brisbane Barracudas
- Coached by: Rebecca Rippon
Medal record
Women's water polo
Representing Australia
Olympic Games
Silver medal – second place	2024 Paris	Team
World Championships
Bronze medal – third place	2019 Gwangju	Team
World Cup
Bronze medal – third place	2018 Surgut
Bronze medal – third place	2026 Sydney

Gabriella Catherine Palm (born 20 May 1998) is an Australian water polo player. She was part of the Australian women's water polo team that finished in second place at the 2024 Summer Olympics.

== Education ==
Palm attended Brisbane Girls Grammar School.

== International career ==
Gabriella Palm stoppes the penalty shootout sending Australia to final in 2024 Olympic Games.

Palm was a member of the Australian Stingrays squad that competed at the Tokyo 2020 Olympics. By finishing second in their pool, the Aussie Stingers went through to the quarterfinals. They were beaten 8-9 by Russia and therefore did not compete for an Olympic medal.

During the Paris 2024 Summer Olympics in semifinal against United States, she stoppes the sixth round of the penalty shootout sending Australia to final.

== Family ==
Her father is former rugby union player Mitchell Palm.
