= Sienna Hearn =

Australian water polo player

Personal information
- Born: 16 July 2002 (age 24) Manly, New South Wales
- Home town: Northern Beaches, Sydney, New South Wales
- Height: 174 cm (5 ft 9 in)

Sport
- Country: Australia
- Sport: Water polo
- Club: UTS Balmain Tigers
- Coached by: Rebecca Rippon
Medal record
Olympic Games
| Silver medal – second place | 2024 Paris | Team |
World Cup
| Bronze medal – third place | 2026 Sydney |

Sienna Hearn (born 16 July 2002) is an Australian water polo player. She was part of the Australian women's water polo team that finished in second place at the 2024 Summer Olympics.

== Water polo career ==
She competed at the 2022 FINA Women's Water Polo World League Intercontinental Cup, 2023 Tri Nations Water Polo Test Match Series, and 2024 World Aquatics Championships.

She played for UTS Balmain Tigers. She trains with the New South Wales Institute of Sport.
