= Genevieve Longman =

Australian water polo player

Personal information
- Born: 2 October 1995 (age 30) Subiaco, Western Australia
- Home town: Perth
- Height: 175 cm (5 ft 9 in)

Sport
- Country: Australia
- Sport: Water polo
- Club: UTS Balmain Tigers
- Coached by: Rebecca Rippon
Medal record
Olympic Games
Silver medal – second place	2024 Paris	Team
World Cup
Bronze medal – third place	2026 Sydney

Genevieve Longman (born 2 October 1995) is an Australian water polo player. She was part of the Australian women's water polo team that finished in second place at the 2024 Summer Olympics.
