= Danijela Jackovich =

Australian water polo player

Dani Jackovich
Personal information
- Full name: Danijela Jackovich
- Nationality: Australian
- Born: 4 November 1994 (age 31) New Lenox, Illinois, U.S.
- Home town: Cronulla, New South Wales, Australia
- Height: 183 cm (6 ft 0 in)

Sport
- Country: Australia
- Sport: Water polo
- Club: Cronulla Sharks
- Coached by: Rebecca Rippon
Medal record
Olympic Games
Silver medal – second place	2024 Paris	Team
World Cup
Bronze medal – third place	2026 Sydney

Danijela Jackovich (born 4 November 1994) is an Australian water polo player. She was part of the Australian team at the 2024 Summer Olympics.

== Water polo career ==
She played for Stanford University. She competed at the 2017 Summer Universiade, and 2024 World Aquatics Championships. At the 2024 Summer Olympics, Jackovich won a silver medal with the Australian team, the Stingers.

She plays for Cronulla Sharks Water Polo Club. Jackovich also works as a operations coordinator for swimwear maker Delfina Sport and a data analyst for the water polo tech firm 6-8 Sports.
