= Sienna Green =

Australian water polo player (born 2004)

Personal information
- Full name: Sienna Rose Green
- Born: 1 November 2004 (age 22) North Sydney, New South Wales, Australia
- Home town: Mosman, New South Wales, Australia: University of Sydney; University of California, Los Angeles
- Height: 193 cm (6 ft 4 in)

Sport
- Country: Australia
- Sport: Water polo
- Position: Centre back
- Coached by: Rebecca Rippon
Medal record
Olympic Games
Silver medal – second place	2024 Paris	Team
World Cup
Bronze medal – third place	2026 Sydney

Sienna Rose Green (born 1 November 2004) is an Australian female water polo Olympian, who plays the centre back position. She competed for Australia at the 2024 Paris Olympics in the water polo women's tournament, and won a silver medal.

== Early and personal life ==
Green was born in North Sydney, New South Wales, Australia. She is the daughter of former water polo players Tessa and Antony Green; her father represented Australia at the 1989 Maccabiah Games (winning a bronze medal) and the 1993 Maccabiah Games in Israel. She has one older sister, Allie, and one older brother, Zac (who played for the Australian men's U18 water polo team, and plays water polo as a defender for UC Santa Barbara). She became interested in water polo at age nine as she saw it as a combination of her two favourite sports, swimming and basketball.

She attended high school at SCEGGS Darlinghurst in Sydney, and lives in Mosman, New South Wales, Australia.

== Water polo career ==
Green's coach is Australian former Olympian Rebecca Rippon.

Green played for the University of Sydney Water Polo Club (the Lions). With them, she won the U18 Australian Nationals competition in 2020, and an Australian Water Polo League (KAP7 Cup) title in 2021.

She played in 2023 as a central defender for the University of California, Los Angeles, scoring 39 goals in the team's 29 games. The team made it to the NCAA semifinals, where it lost to Stanford University, which went on to win the national championship. Green was named Association of Collegiate Water Polo Coaches (ACWPC) All-American (Honorable Mention 2023), Mountain Pacific Sports Federation (MPSF) All-Newcomer Team (2023), and ACWPC All-Academic (Outstanding 2023).

Green was captain of the Australian national U18 girls' team. She was captain and the highest goal-scorer of the Australian team at the 2022 FINA World Women's Youth Water Polo Championships in Belgrade, Serbia.

In 2022, Green earned her first cap for the Stingers, the Australia women's national water polo team, at the 2022 FINA Water Polo World League Intercontinental Cup against Canada; the Stingers won the gold medal in the tournament.

In September 2023 she played for the Australian Women's U20 team in the 2023 World Aquatics Women's U20 Water Polo Championships in Portugal.

At 19 years of age, Green was made the youngest member of the Stingers' 2024 world championships team, and the youngest member of the Stingers ever. She plays for the team as a utility player. Green competed in all seven games at the 2024 World Aquatics Championships, in Doha, Qatar, in which the team came in sixth.

=== 2024 Paris Olympics ===
Green competed for Australia at the 2024 Paris Olympics in the Water polo women's tournament at the Paris Aquatic Centre and Paris La Défense Arena, and won a silver medal with Australia. She was the youngest Australian woman to compete in Water Polo in the Olympics, and scored three goals in seven games, six of which Australia won.

== See also ==
- List of select Jewish water polo players
- List of Olympic medalists in water polo (women)
