= Matilda Kearns =

Australian water polo player

Matilda (Tilly) Kearns
Personal information
- Full name: Matilda Emily Kearns
- Nickname: Tilly
- Born: 2 October 2000 (age 25) Crows Nest, New South Wales, Australia
- Home town: Sydney
- Education: Queenwood School for Girls
- Years active: 2019-present
- Height: 175 cm (5 ft 9 in)

Sport
- Country: Australia
- Sport: Water polo
- Position: Centre Forward
- University team: Sydney Uni Water Polo Club
- Club: University of Southern California
- Team: Aussie Stingers
- Turned pro: 2019
- Coached by: Rebecca Rippon

Achievements and titles
- Olympic finals: Tokyo 2020, Paris 2024
- World finals: 2024 World Aquatics Championships, 6th place 2023 World Aquatics Championships, 4th place 2022 FINA World Championships, 6th place
Medal record
Olympic Games
Silver medal – second place	2024 Paris	Team
World Cup
Bronze medal – third place	2026 Sydney

Matilda Emily Kearns (born 2 October 2000) is an Australian Olympic water polo player who plays for the Australian national team. Her father, Phil Kearns AM, a former Rugby Union player for the Wallabies, and her mother Julie Kearns.

== Early life ==
Born and raised in Sydney, Australia, Tilly began playing water polo for the Sydney Northern Beaches Breakers at the age of 12.

She attended Queenwood School for Girls from 2006 to 2018 where she continued to play for the Sydney Northern Beaches Breakers. She went on to join The University of Sydney's 'Lions' playing center forward, making her debut for the Australian Stingers debut in 2019 at the FINA World League Finals.

== Water polo career ==
She plays for University of Sydney. She plays for University of Southern California.

Kearns was a member of the Australian Stingers squad that competed at the Tokyo 2020 Olympics. By finishing second in their pool, the Aussie Stingers went through to the quarterfinals. They were beaten 8-9 by Russia and therefore did not compete for an Olympic medal. She was also part of the Australian women's water polo team that finished in second place at the 2024 Summer Olympics.

Her father, Phil, is a member of the Australian Rugby Hall of Fame.

== Career highlights ==
- 2016, 2017 and 2018 FINA World Junior Championships
- 2024 World Aquatics Championships, 6th place
- 2023 World Aquatics Championships, 4th place
- 2022 FINA World Championships, 6th place
- 2022 FINA World League International Cup, 1st place
- 2020 Tokyo Olympic Games, 5th place
- 2024 Paris Olympics
