= Zoe Arancini =

Australian club water polo player

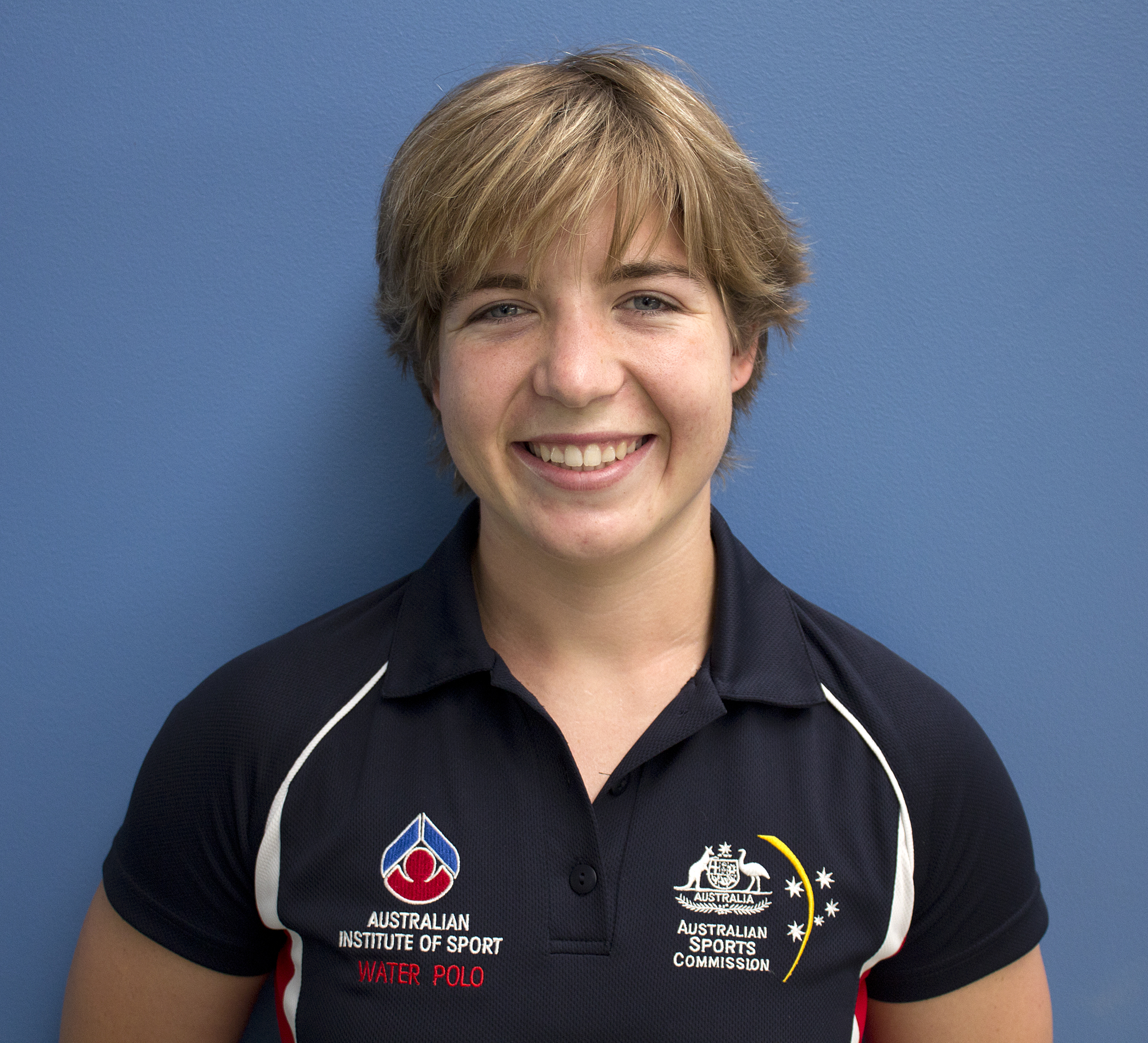
- Arancini in 2012

Personal information
- Full name: Zoe Elise Arancini
- Born: 14 July 1991 (age 35) Subiaco, Perth, Western Australia
- Home town: East Victoria Park, Western Australia
- Height: 170 cm (5 ft 7 in)
- Weight: 70 kg (154 lb)

Sport
- Country: Australia
- Sport: Water polo
- Event: Women's team
- Club: Fremantle Marlins
- Coached by: Rebecca Rippon, Peter Arancini
Medal record
Olympic Games
Silver medal – second place	2024 Paris	Team
World Championships
Silver medal – second place	2013 Barcelona	Team competition
Bronze medal – third place	2019 Gwangju	Team competition
Canada Cup
Gold medal – first place	2011 Canada Cup	Women
FINA World League
Silver medal – second place	2010 United States	Women
Bronze medal – third place	2009 Russia	Women
FINA World Cup
Silver medal – second place	2010 Christchurch	Women
FINA Junior World Championships
Bronze medal – third place	2011 Junior Worlds	Women

Zoe Elise Arancini (born 14 July 1991) is an Australian water polo player who plays driver, counter-attacker, or outside shooter. She plays club water polo in the National Water Polo League for the Fremantle Marlins, where she has won the league championship in 2005, 2007 and 2008 and is coached by her mother. Arancini has represented the country as a member of the Australia women's national water polo team on the junior and senior level, with over eighty appearances for national team between the two levels. She won a gold medal at the 2011 Canada Cup, silver medals at the 2010 FINA World League Super Finals and 2010 FINA World Cup, and bronze medals at the 2009 FINA World League Super Finals and 2011 FINA Junior World Championships. Arancini represented Australia at the 2016 and 2020 Summer Olympics. She was part of the Australian women's water polo team that finished in second place at the 2024 Summer Olympics.

== Personal life ==
Arancini was born on 14 July 1991 in Perth, Western Australia.

She attended Kent Street Senior High School. She attends Curtin University where she is working on a degree in Agriculture and Environment majoring in Coastal Zone Management. She lives in East Victoria Park, Western Australia. She is 170 cm (5 ft 7 in) tall, weighs 70 kilograms (150 lb) and is right-handed.

Several of Arancini's family members have represented Australia in water polo on the international level including her mother, Wendy Meloncelli, her father Peter Arancini and her aunt Megan Meloncelli. Her parents involvement were one of the reasons she chose to compete in water polo, alongside the fact she found the sport more interesting to play than swimming.

== Water polo career ==
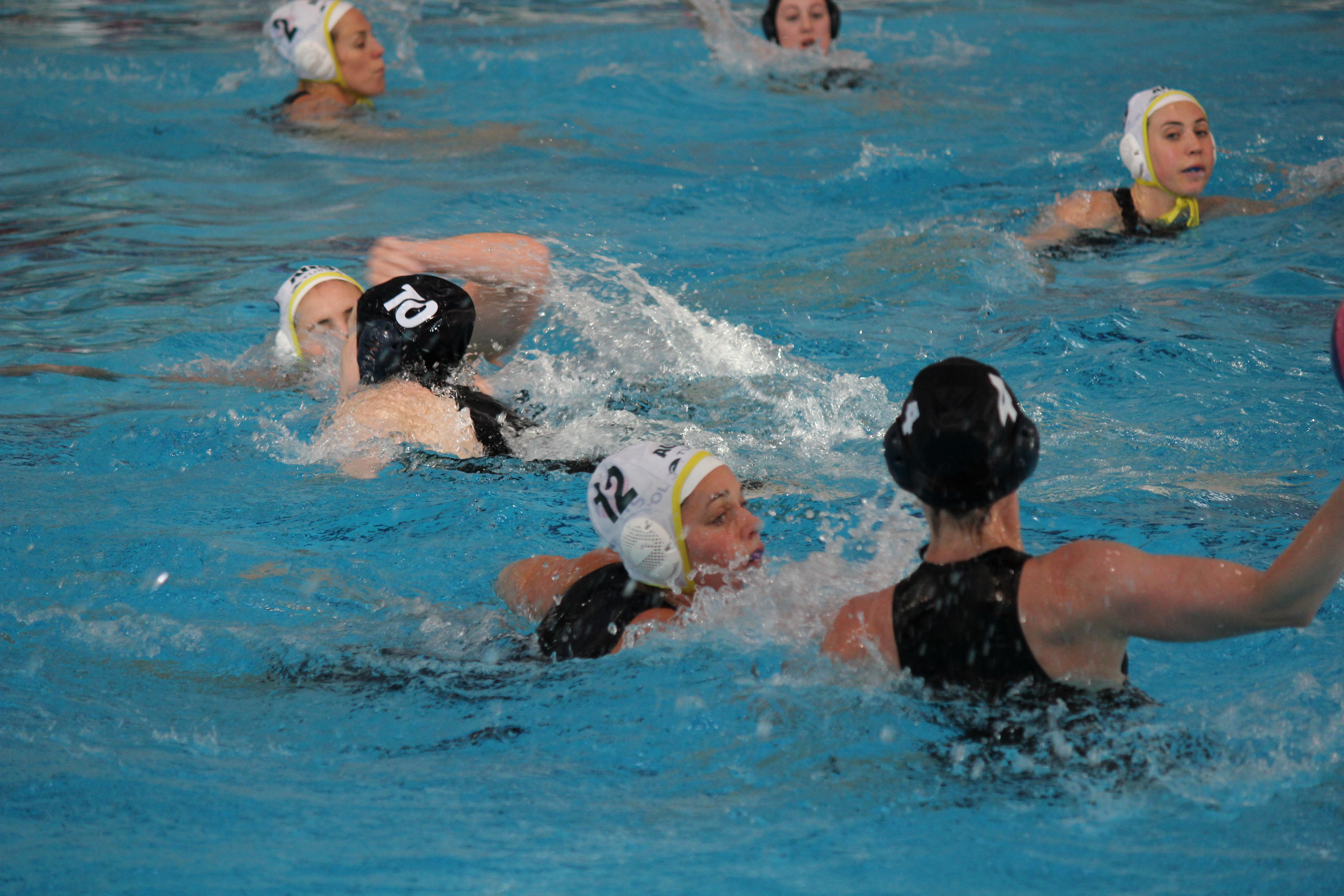
Arancini (top right in white cap) in the third of a five-game test series against the Great Britain women's national water polo team on 25 February 2012. Australia won 15–6

Arancini plays driver, counter-attacker, or outside shooter, and has held a water polo scholarship from the Western Australian Institute of Sport and the Australian Institute of Sport. She plays club water polo for the Melville, Western Australia team in the Premier League. In 2009, she played for them in a match against City Beach and scored three goals where her team won 9–8. She is a member of the Fremantle Marlins of the National Water Polo League from 2005 to the present. In her first season in the league, she scored 7 goals. During the 2007 and 2008 season, she scored 42 and 32 goals respectively. In the 2009 and 2010 seasons, she scored 64 goals and followed this up with 66 in the 2011 season. As of April 2012 she has scored 63 goals in the season. Her mother is her coach on the Marlins. Between the junior and senior sides, she has represented Australia in over eighty games. Her club won the league championships in 2005, 2007 and 2008.

=== Junior national team ===
Arancini has represented Australia on the junior national team. In July 2006, she was a member of the Youth Girls squad that competed in an international series in Auckland, New Zealand. In 2007, she was a member of the U16 national team. She was a member of the junior national side at the 2007 FINA U20 World Championships in Porto, Portugal. In January 2009, she was a member of the national team that competed at the Australian Youth Olympic Festival held in Sydney. She competed in the preliminary match against China where Australia won 17–10. She scored three goals in the match. She also scored three goals in a 19–17 preliminary round loss to Hungary. At the same tournament, she competed in the gold medal finals where her team took silver following a 10–9 loss to Hungary. She scored one goal in the finals match. She represented Australia at the 2009 FINA Junior World Championships, where she was the team captain. Her team finished seventh in the tournament. She was a member of the Australian side that finished third at the 2011 FINA Junior World Championships.

=== Senior national team ===
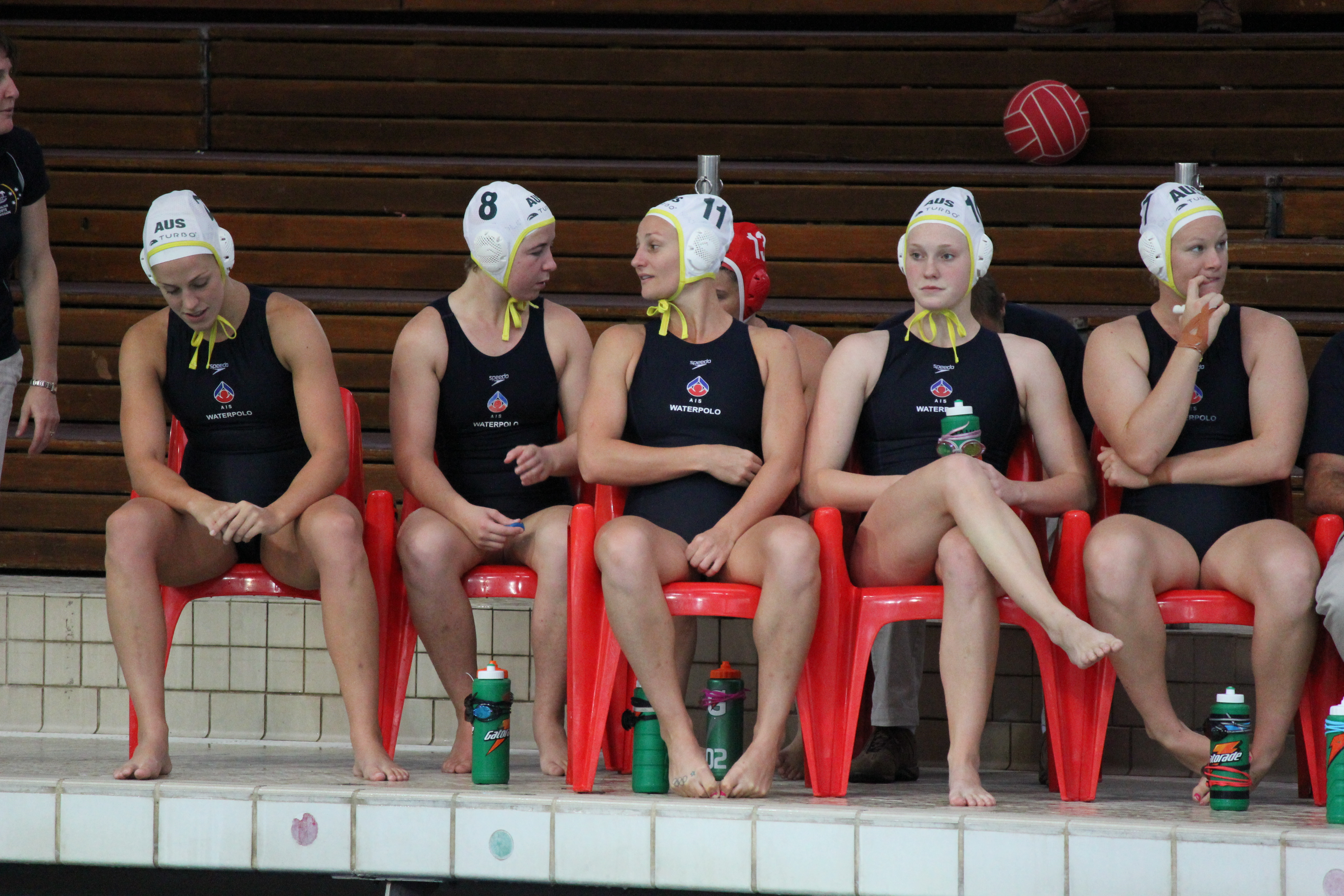
The third of a five-game test series against the Great Britain women's national water polo team on 25 February 2012. Australia won 15–6. On the far left is Bronwen Knox, then Zoe Arancini, Melissa Rippon, Rowena Webster, Hannah Buckling.

Arancini is a member of the Australia women's national water polo team. She made her debut on the senior side in May 2009 in Auckland, New Zealand, in a game against China. In 2009, she was a member of national team that competed at the World Championships, which were held in Russia. That year, she also competed at the 2009 FINA World League Super Finals held in Russia, and where her team finished third. She was a member of the national team that competed in the preliminary rounds of the 2010 FINA World League in Japan from 21 to 23 May and in China from 26 to 28 May. The team went on to play in the finals of the World League, and finished second overall in the tournament, behind the victorious Americans. She was a member of the 2010 Stingers squad that competed at the FINA World Cup in Christchurch, New Zealand. In the team's finals 10–8 victory over the United States, she scored a goal. Her team finished second in the tournament. Late in August 2010, she competed for the national team at the 10th Anniversary Tournament at Sydney Olympic Park. In the preliminaries, she competed in the team's 10–8 win over the United States. She scored a goal from five meters out that helped provide the Australian side with a two-goal lead. In late 2010, she had her 50th cap with the national team. At the 2011 Canada Cup, she scored a goal in the third period in the gold medal match against China that the Australian team ended up winning. She competed in the Pan Pacific Championships in January 2012 for the Australian Barbarians. She was part of the Stingers squad that competed in a five-game test against Great Britain at the AIS in late February 2012. This was the team's first matches against Great Britain's national team in six years.

Arancini was a member of the Australian Stingrays squad that competed at the Tokyo 2020 Olympics. By finishing second in their pool, the Aussie Stingers went through to the quarterfinals. They were beaten 8–9 by Russia and therefore did not compete for an Olympic medal.

== Recognition ==
In 2009, Arancini was named the Australian Junior Women's Player of the Year. In 2010, the Australian Water Polo Hall of Fame named her as the Female Young Player of the Year.

== See also ==
- List of World Aquatics Championships medalists in water polo
