= Claire Wright (water polo) =

Canadian water polo player (born 1994)

Personal information
- National team: Canada women's waterpolo team
- Born: February 2, 1994 (age 32) Oshawa, Ontario
- Height: 178 cm (5 ft 10 in)
Medal record
Representing Canada
Pan American Games
Silver medal – second place	2015 Toronto	Team

Claire Wright (born February 2, 1994) is a Canadian water polo player. She plays for the Canadian national women's water polo team, and also played collegiately at Loyola Marymount University.

== Career highlights ==
=== Youth competitor ===
Event	Rank
2011 Youth Pan American Championships	Gold
2011 Junior Pan American Games	Gold
2012 Junior Pan American Championships	Silver
2012 FINA Youth World Championships	5th
2013 Junior Pan American Games	Gold
2013 FISU World University Games	4th
2013 FINA Junior World Championships	9th

=== Senior competitor ===
Event	Rank
2014 FINA World League	6th
2015 Pan American Games	Silver
2017 FINA World League	Silver
2019 FINA World Championships	9th
2021 FINA World League	4th

== 2020 Tokyo Summer Olympics ==
One of 371 Canadian athletes competing, Wright made her Olympic debut at the 2020 Summer Olympics in Tokyo, where Team Canada finished in 7th place.

== Personal life ==
Wright started playing water polo at age 16. She graduated from Loyola Marymount University in 2018 with a degree in Health and Human Sciences.

Her younger sister Emma also plays for Team Canada. Her uncle Jeff Beukeboom played in the NHL for the New York Rangers and Edmonton Oilers.
