= Abby Andrews =

Australian water polo player (born 2000)

Personal information
- Born: 28 November 2000 (age 25) South Brisbane, Queensland, Australia
- Home town: Brisbane, Queensland, Australia
- Height: 1.79 m (5 ft 10 in)

Sport
- Country: Australia
- Sport: Water polo
- Team: Australia women's national water polo team; Queensland Thunder
- Coached by: Rebecca Rippon
Medal record
Olympic Games
Silver medal – second place	2024 Paris	Team
World Cup
Bronze medal – third place	2026 Sydney

Abby Andrews (born 28 November 2000) is an Australian water polo player. She was born in South Brisbane, Queensland, and represented Australia at the Tokyo 2020 Olympics. She was part of the Australian women's water polo team that finished in second place at the 2024 Summer Olympics.

== Early life ==
Andrews went to Brisbane Girls Grammar. She competed at the 2018 Youth World Championships during her studies at University of Queensland. She then enrolled in the University of Michigan. She was named the 2019 Collegiate Water Polo Association (CWPA) Rookie of the Tournament and Rookie of the Year.

== Achievements ==
Andrews then competed at the 2019 World University Games in Naples, Italy where Australia came fifth.

She was a member of the Australian Stingrays squad that competed at the Tokyo 2020 Olympics. By finishing second in their pool, the Aussie Stingers went through to the quarterfinals. They were beaten 8-9 by Russia and therefore did not compete for an Olympic medal.
