= Alice Williams (water polo) =

Australian water polo player

Personal information
- Born: 24 December 1998 (age 27) Auchenflower, Brisbane, Queensland, Australia
- Height: 175 cm (5 ft 9 in)

Sport
- Country: Australia
- Sport: Water polo
- Club: Queensland Thunder
- Coached by: Rebecca Rippon
Medal record
Olympic Games
Silver medal – second place	2024 Paris	Team
World Cup
Bronze medal – third place	2026 Sydney

Alice Williams (born 24 December 1998) is an Australian water polo player. She was part of the Australian women's water polo team that finished in second place at the 2024 Summer Olympics.

== Water polo career ==
She competed at the 2017 FINA Women's Water Polo World League Intercontinental, 2018 FINA Women's Water Polo World League Intercontinental Cup, 2019 Summer Universiade, 2023 World Aquatics Championships, and 2024 World Aquatics Championships.

She plays for Queensland Thunder.
