= Mitchell Palm =

Australia international rugby union player

- Full name: Mitchell Brice Hinkler Palm
- Born: 22 July 1967 (age 59) Bundaberg, QLD, Australia
- School: Brisbane Boys' College
- University: University of Queensland

Rugby union career
- Position: Fly-half / Centre
International career
| Years | Team | Apps | (Points) |
| 1989 | Australia | | |

Mitchell Brice Hinkler Palm (born 22 July 1967) is an Australian former rugby union player.

Born in Bundaberg, Queensland, Palm was educated at Brisbane Boys' College, and was school captain in 1984.

Palm won a first-grade premiership with the University of Queensland in 1988, playing beside Michael Lynagh at inside centre for the grand final win over Souths, in which he kicked 10 points. His 1988 season also included a two-try performance from fly-half in the Varsity match win over Sydney University and ended with selection in a preparatory Wallabies squad for the next World Cup. In 1989, Palm toured South America with Queensland, scoring 50 points from four games, then made the Wallabies squad for a tour of Canada and France. He made his Wallabies debut against the North American Wolverines and made three further uncapped appearances in France.

A knee injury, first suffered during a stint in Italy, brought about his premature retirement from rugby.

Palm is the father of water polo player Gabriella Palm, who competed at the 2020 Olympics in Tokyo.
