= Charlize Andrews =

Australian water polo player (born 2001)

Personal information
- Born: 26 December 2001 (age 24) Herston, Brisbane, Queensland, Australia
- Home town: Brisbane
- Height: 175 cm (5 ft 9 in)

Sport
- Country: Australia
- Sport: Water polo
- Event: Women's water polo
- Club: Queensland Thunder
- Coached by: Rebecca Rippon
Medal record
Olympic Games
Silver medal – second place	2024 Paris	Team
World Cup
Bronze medal – third place	2026 Sydney

Charlize Andrews (born 26 December 2001) is an Australian water polo player.

In 2022, Andrews debuted in the Australia women's national water polo team in connection with the FINA Water Polo World League Intercontinental Cup in Peru. Andrews then made her Olympic debut at the 2024 Summer Olympics in Paris where she won the silver medal in the women's water polo event.
