= Martina Terré =

Spanish water polo player (born 2002)

Personal information
- Full name: Martina Terré Martí
- Nationality: Spanish
- Born: 28 August 2002 (age 24) Barcelona, Spain
- Height: 175 cm (5 ft 9 in)
Medal record
Women's water polo
Representing Spain
Olympic Games
Gold medal – first place	2024 Paris	Team
World Championship
Bronze medal – third place	2025 Singapore	Team
World Cup
Silver medal – second place	2026 Sydney
European Championships
Gold medal – first place	2022 Split

Martina Terré Martí (Note: In this Spanish name, the first or paternal surname is Terré and the second or maternal family name is Martí.) (born 28 August 2002) is a Spanish water polo player. She represented Spain at the 2024 Summer Olympics in Paris, where she won the gold medal.
