= Paula Camús =

Spanish water polo player (born 2002)

Personal information
- Full name: Paula Camús Amorós
- Nationality: Spanish
- Born: 12 February 2002 (age 24) Madrid, Spain
- Height: 180 cm (5 ft 11 in)
Medal record
Women's water polo
Representing Spain
Olympic Games
| Gold medal – first place | 2024 Paris | Team |
World Championship
| Bronze medal – third place | 2025 Singapore | Team |
World Cup
| Silver medal – second place | 2026 Sydney |
European Championships
| Gold medal – first place | 2022 Split |

Paula Camús Amorós (Note: In this Spanish name, the first or paternal surname is Camús and the second or maternal family name is Amorós.) (born 12 February 2002) is a Spanish water polo player. She represented Spain at the 2024 Summer Olympics.
