= Bronte Halligan =

Australian water polo player

Personal information
- Full name: Bronte Riley Halligan
- Born: 12 August 1996 (age 30) Crows Nest, Sydney, New South Wales, Australia
- Home town: Manly, New South Wales
- Height: 1.76 m (5 ft 9 in)
- Weight: 80 kg (176 lb)

Sport
- Country: Australia
- Sport: Water polo
- Event: Women's water polo
- College team: University of California, Los Angeles
- Club: AS Orizzonte Catania, Italy
Medal record
Olympic Games
Silver medal – second place	2024 Paris	Team
World Cup
Bronze medal – third place	2026 Sydney

Bronte Riley Halligan (born 12 August 1996) is an Australian water polo player.

Halligan was a member of the Australian Stingrays squad that competed at the Tokyo 2020 Olympics. By finishing second in their pool, the Aussie Stingers went through to the quarterfinals. They were beaten 8-9 by Russia and therefore did not compete for an Olympic medal.

She was part of the Australian women's water polo team that finished in second place at the 2024 Summer Olympics.

Her father is former rugby league player, Daryl Halligan.
