= Paula Crespí =

Spanish water polo player (born 1998)

Personal information
- Full name: Paula Crespí Barriga
- Born: 7 April 1998 (age 28) L'Hospitalet, Spain
- Height: 1.75 m (5 ft 9 in)
- Weight: 70 kg (154 lb)

Sport
- Sport: Water polo
Medal record
Olympic Games
Gold medal – first place	2024 Paris	Team
World Championships
Silver medal – second place	2017 Budapest	Team
Silver medal – second place	2019 Gwangju	Team
Silver medal – second place	2023 Fukuoka	Team
Bronze medal – third place	2024 Doha	Team
Bronze medal – third place	2025 Singapore	Team
European Championships
Gold medal – first place	2020 Budapest
Silver medal – second place	2024 Eindhoven
World Cup
Silver medal – second place	2026 Sydney
Bronze medal – third place	2023 Long Beach
Europa Cup
Bronze medal – third place	2018 Pontevedra
European Games
Silver medal – second place	2015 Baku	Team

Paula Crespí Barriga (born 7 April 1998) is a Spanish water polo player who won the silver medal at the 2017 World Championships in Budapest and at the 2019 World Championships in Gwangju.

== See also ==
- List of World Aquatics Championships medalists in water polo
