= Natalia Markopoulou =

Greek water polo referee

Personal information
- Native name: Ναταλία Μαρκοπούλου
- Nationality: Greek
- Born: 8 February 1982 (age 44) Agrinio, Greece
- Occupation: Water polo referee
- Years active: 2014–present

Sport
- Sport: Water polo

Natalia Markopoulou (Ναταλία Μαρκοπούλου; born 8 February 1982) is a Greek water polo referee, who has officiated at national and international water polo competitions, representing Greece in major tournaments.

She is among the Greek female referees who have reached the highest levels of international water polo officiating.

== Early life and playing career ==
Markopoulou was born in Agrinio, Greece. Before becoming a referee, she was involved in aquatic sports as an athlete. She competed in swimming from 1992 to 1997 and in water polo from 1997 to 2013, including appearances in the Greek A1 and A2 divisions.

== Refereeing career ==
Markopoulou began her refereeing career in 2014 and became an international water polo referee in 2017. She has officiated matches in Greek national competitions and international tournaments organised by European and world water polo governing bodies.

In January 2018, Markopoulou and fellow Greek referee Maria Daskalopoulou became the first women to officiate a men's A1 Greek Water Polo League match, marking a milestone for women in Greek water polo refereeing.

Markopoulou has represented Greece as an international referee in several major competitions. She was selected as a referee for the water polo tournament at the 2024 Summer Olympics in Paris, where she officiated matches including the women's preliminary round match between Hungary and Canada.

She has also officiated at World Cup and World Championship level competitions and was appointed among the referees for the 2026 Women's European Water Polo Championship. Noticeably, in July 2026, she officiated as first referee the semifinal game of Spain vs. Russia in the 2026 FINA Women's Water Polo World Cup, held in Sydney, and two days later, the bronze-medal game between Australia and Russia.

== Personal life ==
She is married and has one son. Markopoulou has studied physical education and sports science at the National and Kapodistrian University of Athens, and also holds a MSc degree in the area of exercise and quality of life. She fluently speaks English and Spanish.
