= Nona Pérez =

Spanish water polo player (born 2003)

Personal information
- Full name: Nona Pérez Vivas
- Born: 10 April 2003 (age 23) Sabadell, Spain
- Height: 169 cm (5 ft 7 in)
Medal record
Women's water polo
Representing Spain
Olympic Games
Gold medal – first place	2024 Paris	Team
World Championship
Bronze medal – third place	2025 Singapore	Team
World Cup
Silver medal – second place	2026 Sydney
European Championships
Gold medal – first place	2022 Split

Nona Pérez Vivas (Note: In this Spanish name, the first or paternal surname is Pérez and the second or maternal family name is Vivas.) (born 10 April 2003) is a Spanish water polo player. She represented Spain at the 2024 Summer Olympics.
