= Shakira January =

South African water polo player

Personal information
- Nationality: South African
- Born: 15 November 2002 (age 23) Johannesburg, South Africa

Sport
- Sport: Water polo

Shakira January is a South African water polo player, who is a member of the South Africa women's national water polo team. She was part of the team in the women's water polo tournament at the 2020 Summer Olympics.

She participated in the 2018 Pan Pacific Youth Water Polo Tournament, and 2019 FINA U20 Water Polo World Championship .
