= Emily Ausmus =

American water polo player (born 2005)

Personal information
- Full name: Emily Mary Ausmus
- Born: December 12, 2005 (age 20) Baldwin Park, California, U.S.
- Education: Martin Luther King High School

Sport
- Country: United States
- Sport: Water polo
Medal record
World Cup
Gold medal – first place	2026 Sydney

Emily Mary Ausmus (/ˈɔːzməs/ AWZ-məss; born December 12, 2005) is an American water polo player. She was selected as part of the United States team at the 2024 Summer Olympics.

== Biography ==
Ausmus was born on December 12, 2005, and grew up in Riverside, California. She began playing water polo at age eight, joining the local Riverside Water Polo club before later moving to the SoCal Water Polo club. She showed talent in the sport from a young age; when she was 12, she was chosen for the U.S. team at the Pan American Junior Championships, where she was against players as old as 19.

Ausmus continued to progress through the youth ranks. She attended Martin Luther King High School in Riverside, where she played for the water polo team and led the team to two Big VIII League championships and an appearance in the CIF Southern Section final. In 2022, at age 16, she was chosen as an alternate for the U.S. national team at the 2022 World Aquatics Championships. She was called up to the senior national team several other times that year and was the only high schooler chosen for the squad when they played against Australia in December 2022. In March 2023, The Press-Enterprise named her the IE Varsity Girls Water Polo Player of the Year. Later that year, she participated at the World Aquatics Championships and the Pan American Games, helping the U.S. team win the gold medal at the latter event.

After having graduated from high school, Ausmus committed to play in college at USC, although she took a year off from school to focus on water polo. She was a member of the U.S. squad at the 2024 World Aquatics Championships and scored four goals. Later in 2024, she was chosen as a member of the 13-player U.S. squad for the 2024 Summer Olympics, being the youngest player chosen.
