= 2026 World Aquatics Women's Water Polo World Cup =

- League: Women's Water Polo World Cup
- Sport: Water polo
- Duration: 21 April – 26 July

Super Final
- Finals champions: United States (6th title)
- Runners-up: Spain

Women's Water Polo World Cup seasons
- ← 2025 2027 →

The 2026 World Aquatics Women's Water Polo World Cup was the 20th season of the event. It ran from 21 April to 26 July 2026. The super final was held in Sydney, Australia.

The United States won their sixth title, with a win over Spain. The top three teams qualified for the women's water polo tournament of the 2027 World Aquatics Championships.

== Format ==
There were two divisions. The top-five teams of Division 1 and the top-two teams from Division 2, together with the host Australia, competed in the super final. A win gave a team three points, a win after penalties two, a loss after penalties one and a loss after regular time zero points.

== Division 1 ==
Division 1
Tournament details
- Host country: Netherlands
- Venue: 1
- Dates: 1–6 May
- Teams: 8

Tournament statistics
- Matches played: 24
- Goals scored: 579 (24.13 per match)
- Top scorers: (Hungary) Kata Hajdú (18 goals)

Official website
- www.worldaquatics.com

Division 1 was held in Rotterdam, Netherlands between 1 and 6 May 2026.

The teams were split into two pools of four teams, with the top two-teams forming a new group, same with the bottom two-teams. The top five teams advanced to the super final.

All times are local (UTC+2).

=== Preliminary round ===
==== Group A ====
Pos	Team	Pld	W	PW	PL	L	GF	GA	GD	Pts	Qualification
1	Spain	3	2	1	0	0	53	31	+22	8	Group C
2	United States	3	2	0	1	0	52	28	+24	7	Group C
3	Hungary	3	1	0	0	2	33	39	−6	3	Group D
4	Japan	3	0	0	0	3	30	70	−40	0	Group D

Source: Microplustiming
Rules for classification: 1) Points; 2) Head-to-head points; 3) Head-to-head goal difference; 4) Head-to-head goals scored; 5) Goal difference.

1 May 2026; 14:00	Report	United States	12–8	Hungary	Zwemcentrum, Rotterdam; Referees: Nicola Johnson (AUS), Aurely Bouchez (FRA)
1 May 2026; 14:00	Report	Score by quarters: 3–1, 0–2, 6–2, 3–3			Zwemcentrum, Rotterdam; Referees: Nicola Johnson (AUS), Aurely Bouchez (FRA)
1 May 2026; 14:00	Report	Ausmus, Roemer 3	Goals	Faragó 3	Zwemcentrum, Rotterdam; Referees: Nicola Johnson (AUS), Aurely Bouchez (FRA)

1 May 2026; 15:45	Report	Japan	10–26	Spain	Zwemcentrum, Rotterdam; Referees: Maria Daskalopoulou (GRE), Alessia Ferrari (ITA)
1 May 2026; 15:45	Report	Score by quarters: 1–7, 4–4, 2–8, 3–7			Zwemcentrum, Rotterdam; Referees: Maria Daskalopoulou (GRE), Alessia Ferrari (ITA)
1 May 2026; 15:45	Report	Kawaguchi, Lowrey 3	Goals	Camús 5	Zwemcentrum, Rotterdam; Referees: Maria Daskalopoulou (GRE), Alessia Ferrari (ITA)

2 May 2026; 14:00	Report	Hungary	16–12	Japan	Zwemcentrum, Rotterdam; Referees: Marieke van den Berg (NED), Germán Moller (ARG)
2 May 2026; 14:00	Report	Score by quarters: 5–4, 4–3, 3–2, 4–3			Zwemcentrum, Rotterdam; Referees: Marieke van den Berg (NED), Germán Moller (ARG)
2 May 2026; 14:00	Report	Varró 4	Goals	Arima 4	Zwemcentrum, Rotterdam; Referees: Marieke van den Berg (NED), Germán Moller (ARG)

2 May 2026; 15:45	Report	Spain	12–12; PSO: 4–3	United States	Zwemcentrum, Rotterdam; Referees: Alessia Ferrari (ITA), Nicola Johnson (AUS)
2 May 2026; 15:45	Report	Score by quarters: 2–3, 6–4, 2–3, 2–2			Zwemcentrum, Rotterdam; Referees: Alessia Ferrari (ITA), Nicola Johnson (AUS)
2 May 2026; 15:45	Report	four players 2	Goals	Flynn 4	Zwemcentrum, Rotterdam; Referees: Alessia Ferrari (ITA), Nicola Johnson (AUS)

3 May 2026; 14:00	Report	United States	28–8	Japan	Zwemcentrum, Rotterdam; Referees: Maria Daskalopoulou (GRE), Marieke van den Berg (NED)
3 May 2026; 14:00	Report	Score by quarters: 6–2, 9–1, 7–1, 6–4			Zwemcentrum, Rotterdam; Referees: Maria Daskalopoulou (GRE), Marieke van den Berg (NED)
3 May 2026; 14:00	Report	three players 5	Goals	Ura 3	Zwemcentrum, Rotterdam; Referees: Maria Daskalopoulou (GRE), Marieke van den Berg (NED)

3 May 2026; 15:45	Report	Hungary	9–15	Spain	Zwemcentrum, Rotterdam; Referees: Alessia Ferrari (ITA), Aurely Bouchez (FRA)
3 May 2026; 15:45	Report	Score by quarters: 3–2, 4–5, 0–3, 2–5			Zwemcentrum, Rotterdam; Referees: Alessia Ferrari (ITA), Aurely Bouchez (FRA)
3 May 2026; 15:45	Report	Hajdú, Szilágyi 2	Goals	Ortiz 4	Zwemcentrum, Rotterdam; Referees: Alessia Ferrari (ITA), Aurely Bouchez (FRA)

==== Group B ====
Pos	Team	Pld	W	PW	PL	L	GF	GA	GD	Pts	Qualification
1	Netherlands (H)	3	2	0	0	1	36	28	+8	6	Group C
2	Italy	3	1	1	0	1	33	35	−2	5	Group C
3	Australia	3	1	0	1	1	31	34	−3	4	Group D
4	Greece	3	1	0	0	2	33	36	−3	3	Group D

Source: Microplustiming
Rules for classification: 1) Points; 2) Head-to-head points; 3) Head-to-head goal difference; 4) Head-to-head goals scored; 5) Goal difference.
(H) Host

1 May 2026; 18:30	Report	Netherlands	14–8	Australia	Zwemcentrum, Rotterdam; Referees: Asumi Nishihara (JPN), Alex Márquez (ESP)
1 May 2026; 18:30	Report	Score by quarters: 3–4, 4–1, 4–1, 3–2			Zwemcentrum, Rotterdam; Referees: Asumi Nishihara (JPN), Alex Márquez (ESP)
1 May 2026; 18:30	Report	Joustra, Moolhuijzen 3	Goals	C. Andrews, Williams 2	Zwemcentrum, Rotterdam; Referees: Asumi Nishihara (JPN), Alex Márquez (ESP)

1 May 2026; 20:15	Report	Italy	11–15	Greece	Zwemcentrum, Rotterdam; Referees: Nikolett Sajben (HUN), Germán Moller (ARG)
1 May 2026; 20:15	Report	Score by quarters: 3–4, 1–3, 2–3, 5–5			Zwemcentrum, Rotterdam; Referees: Nikolett Sajben (HUN), Germán Moller (ARG)
1 May 2026; 20:15	Report	Bianconi 3	Goals	E. Plevritou, Santa 3	Zwemcentrum, Rotterdam; Referees: Nikolett Sajben (HUN), Germán Moller (ARG)

2 May 2026; 18:30	Report	Greece	8–12	Netherlands	Zwemcentrum, Rotterdam; Referees: Aurely Bouchez (FRA), Tiffany Spiritsanto (USA)
2 May 2026; 18:30	Report	Score by quarters: 1–3, 3–4, 1–4, 3–1			Zwemcentrum, Rotterdam; Referees: Aurely Bouchez (FRA), Tiffany Spiritsanto (USA)
2 May 2026; 18:30	Report	Santa 3	Goals	Moolhuijzen 3	Zwemcentrum, Rotterdam; Referees: Aurely Bouchez (FRA), Tiffany Spiritsanto (USA)

2 May 2026; 20:15	Report	Australia	10–10; PSO: 4–5	Italy	Zwemcentrum, Rotterdam; Referees: Nikolett Sajben (HUN), Asumi Nishihara (JPN)
2 May 2026; 20:15	Report	Score by quarters: 3–1, 4–1, 2–5, 1–3			Zwemcentrum, Rotterdam; Referees: Nikolett Sajben (HUN), Asumi Nishihara (JPN)
2 May 2026; 20:15	Report	three players 2	Goals	Bettini, Giustini 2	Zwemcentrum, Rotterdam; Referees: Nikolett Sajben (HUN), Asumi Nishihara (JPN)

3 May 2026; 18:30	Report	Italy	12–10	Netherlands	Zwemcentrum, Rotterdam; Referees: Tiffany Spiritsanto (USA), Asumi Nishihara (JPN)
3 May 2026; 18:30	Report	Score by quarters: 3–3, 2–2, 1–3, 6–2			Zwemcentrum, Rotterdam; Referees: Tiffany Spiritsanto (USA), Asumi Nishihara (JPN)
3 May 2026; 18:30	Report	Ranalli 3	Goals	Schaap 3	Zwemcentrum, Rotterdam; Referees: Tiffany Spiritsanto (USA), Asumi Nishihara (JPN)

3 May 2026; 20:15	Report	Greece	10–13	Australia	Zwemcentrum, Rotterdam; Referees: Nikolett Sajben (HUN), Germán Moller (ARG)
3 May 2026; 20:15	Report	Score by quarters: 4–4, 2–3, 3–4, 1–2			Zwemcentrum, Rotterdam; Referees: Nikolett Sajben (HUN), Germán Moller (ARG)
3 May 2026; 20:15	Report	three players 2	Goals	A. Andrews 3	Zwemcentrum, Rotterdam; Referees: Nikolett Sajben (HUN), Germán Moller (ARG)

=== Second round ===
==== Group C ====
Pos	Team	Pld	W	PW	PL	L	GF	GA	GD	Pts	Qualification
1	United States	3	3	0	0	0	32	18	+14	9	Super final
2	Netherlands (H)	3	2	0	0	1	30	21	+9	6	Super final
3	Spain	3	1	0	0	2	26	27	−1	3	Super final
4	Italy	3	0	0	0	3	17	39	−22	0	Super final

Source: Microplustiming
Rules for classification: 1) Points; 2) Head-to-head points; 3) Head-to-head goal difference; 4) Head-to-head goals scored; 5) Goal difference.
(H) Host

4 May 2026; 18:30	Report	Netherlands	10–12	United States	Zwemcentrum, Rotterdam; Referees: Nicola Johnson (AUS), Germán Moller (ARG)
4 May 2026; 18:30	Report	Score by quarters: 2–1, 2–5, 4–3, 2–3			Zwemcentrum, Rotterdam; Referees: Nicola Johnson (AUS), Germán Moller (ARG)
4 May 2026; 18:30	Report	four players 2	Goals	Neushul 4	Zwemcentrum, Rotterdam; Referees: Nicola Johnson (AUS), Germán Moller (ARG)

4 May 2026; 20:15	Report	Spain	14–12	Italy	Zwemcentrum, Rotterdam; Referees: Nikolett Sajben (HUN), Maria Daskalopoulou (GRE)
4 May 2026; 20:15	Report	Score by quarters: 3–3, 3–3, 5–3, 3–3			Zwemcentrum, Rotterdam; Referees: Nikolett Sajben (HUN), Maria Daskalopoulou (GRE)
4 May 2026; 20:15	Report	E. Ruiz 4	Goals	Bettini, Ranalli 3	Zwemcentrum, Rotterdam; Referees: Nikolett Sajben (HUN), Maria Daskalopoulou (GRE)

5 May 2026; 18:30	Report	Netherlands	12–2	Italy	Zwemcentrum, Rotterdam; Referees: Aurely Bouchez (FRA), Maria Daskalopoulou (GRE)
5 May 2026; 18:30	Report	Score by quarters: 3–0, 2–1, 2–0, 5–1			Zwemcentrum, Rotterdam; Referees: Aurely Bouchez (FRA), Maria Daskalopoulou (GRE)
5 May 2026; 18:30	Report	Moolhuijzen, Schaap 3	Goals	Bianconi, Cocchiere 1	Zwemcentrum, Rotterdam; Referees: Aurely Bouchez (FRA), Maria Daskalopoulou (GRE)

5 May 2026; 20:15	Report	Spain	5–7	United States	Zwemcentrum, Rotterdam; Referees: Nikolett Sajben (HUN), Asumi Nishihara (JPN)
5 May 2026; 20:15	Report	Score by quarters: 2–0, 1–2, 2–2, 0–3			Zwemcentrum, Rotterdam; Referees: Nikolett Sajben (HUN), Asumi Nishihara (JPN)
5 May 2026; 20:15	Report	five players 1	Goals	Neushul 2	Zwemcentrum, Rotterdam; Referees: Nikolett Sajben (HUN), Asumi Nishihara (JPN)

6 May 2026; 18:30	Report	Spain	7–8	Netherlands	Zwemcentrum, Rotterdam; Referees: Germán Moller (ARG), Nicola Johnson (AUS)
6 May 2026; 18:30	Report	Score by quarters: 1–2, 4–2, 1–1, 1–3			Zwemcentrum, Rotterdam; Referees: Germán Moller (ARG), Nicola Johnson (AUS)
6 May 2026; 18:30	Report	Ortiz, Pérez 2	Goals	Bosveld 2	Zwemcentrum, Rotterdam; Referees: Germán Moller (ARG), Nicola Johnson (AUS)

6 May 2026; 20:15	Report	Italy	3–13	United States	Zwemcentrum, Rotterdam; Referees: Maria Daskalopoulou (GRE), Asumi Nishihara (JPN)
6 May 2026; 20:15	Report	Score by quarters: 0–3, 2–3, 0–4, 1–3			Zwemcentrum, Rotterdam; Referees: Maria Daskalopoulou (GRE), Asumi Nishihara (JPN)
6 May 2026; 20:15	Report	three players 1	Goals	Fattal 4	Zwemcentrum, Rotterdam; Referees: Maria Daskalopoulou (GRE), Asumi Nishihara (JPN)

==== Group D ====
Pos	Team	Pld	W	PW	PL	L	GF	GA	GD	Pts	Qualification
1	Australia	3	2	0	0	1	46	25	+21	6 (Note: Australia 3 Pts, +9 GD; Hungary 3 Pts, −3 GD; Greece 3 Pts, −6 GD.)	Super final (Note: The Australia already qualified as host, so second place team also qualifies.)
2	Hungary	3	2	0	0	1	46	34	+12	6	Super final
3	Greece	3	2	0	0	1	42	42	0	6	
4	Japan	3	0	0	0	3	39	72	−33	0	

Source: Microplustiming
Rules for classification: 1) Points; 2) Head-to-head points; 3) Head-to-head goal difference; 4) Head-to-head goals scored; 5) Goal difference.
Notes:

4 May 2026; 14:00	Report	Hungary	9–14	Greece	Zwemcentrum, Rotterdam; Referees: Marieke van den Berg (NED), Tiffany Spiritsanto (USA)
4 May 2026; 14:00	Report	Score by quarters: 2–1, 2–3, 3–4, 2–6			Zwemcentrum, Rotterdam; Referees: Marieke van den Berg (NED), Tiffany Spiritsanto (USA)
4 May 2026; 14:00	Report	Faragó 4	Goals	Siouti 5	Zwemcentrum, Rotterdam; Referees: Marieke van den Berg (NED), Tiffany Spiritsanto (USA)

4 May 2026; 15:45	Report	Australia	22–10	Japan	Zwemcentrum, Rotterdam; Referees: Alex Márquez (ESP), Alessia Ferrari (ITA)
4 May 2026; 15:45	Report	Score by quarters: 7–3, 6–3, 5–3, 4–1			Zwemcentrum, Rotterdam; Referees: Alex Márquez (ESP), Alessia Ferrari (ITA)
4 May 2026; 15:45	Report	four players 3	Goals	four players 2	Zwemcentrum, Rotterdam; Referees: Alex Márquez (ESP), Alessia Ferrari (ITA)

5 May 2026; 14:00	Report	Australia	17–6	Greece	Zwemcentrum, Rotterdam; Referees: Alex Márquez (ESP), Tiffany Spiritsanto (USA)
5 May 2026; 14:00	Report	Score by quarters: 8–1, 4–3, 2–2, 3–0			Zwemcentrum, Rotterdam; Referees: Alex Márquez (ESP), Tiffany Spiritsanto (USA)
5 May 2026; 14:00	Report	Halligan, Jackovich 4	Goals	Xenaki 3	Zwemcentrum, Rotterdam; Referees: Alex Márquez (ESP), Tiffany Spiritsanto (USA)

5 May 2026; 15:45	Report	Hungary	28–13	Japan	Zwemcentrum, Rotterdam; Referees: Marieke van den Berg (NED), Germán Moller (ARG)
5 May 2026; 15:45	Report	Score by quarters: 6–1, 7–6, 8–1, 7–5			Zwemcentrum, Rotterdam; Referees: Marieke van den Berg (NED), Germán Moller (ARG)
5 May 2026; 15:45	Report	Hajdú 8	Goals	Ura 3	Zwemcentrum, Rotterdam; Referees: Marieke van den Berg (NED), Germán Moller (ARG)

6 May 2026; 14:00	Report	Hungary	9–7	Australia	Zwemcentrum, Rotterdam; Referees: Alessia Ferrari (ITA), Aurely Bouchez (FRA)
6 May 2026; 14:00	Report	Score by quarters: 3–4, 4–1, 0–1, 2–1			Zwemcentrum, Rotterdam; Referees: Alessia Ferrari (ITA), Aurely Bouchez (FRA)
6 May 2026; 14:00	Report	Vályi 3	Goals	A. Andrews 3	Zwemcentrum, Rotterdam; Referees: Alessia Ferrari (ITA), Aurely Bouchez (FRA)

6 May 2026; 15:45	Report	Japan	16–22	Greece	Zwemcentrum, Rotterdam; Referees: Alex Márquez (ESP), Marieke van den Berg (NED)
6 May 2026; 15:45	Report	Score by quarters: 5–3, 2–8, 4–5, 5–6			Zwemcentrum, Rotterdam; Referees: Alex Márquez (ESP), Marieke van den Berg (NED)
6 May 2026; 15:45	Report	Ura 4	Goals	Siouti 5	Zwemcentrum, Rotterdam; Referees: Alex Márquez (ESP), Marieke van den Berg (NED)

== Division 2 ==
Division 2
Tournament details
- Host country: Malta
- Venue: 1
- Dates: 21–26 April

Tournament statistics
- Matches played: 42
- Goals scored: 1,067 (25.4 per match)
- Top scorers: (Croatia) Ria Glas (26 goals)

Official website
- www.worldaquatics.com

The Division 2 tournament was held in Msida, Malta, between 21 and 26 April 2026.

The teams were sorted in one league phase, playing three games based on ranking. The top 8 teams of the standings advanced to the knockout stage, where the top-two teams qualified for the super final.

All times are (UTC+2).

=== League phase ===
Teams are ranked by average Tournament Performance Index (TPI) points, calculated using the margin of victory/defeat and the strength of opposition, before the other tiebreakers are used.

Pos	Team	Pld	W	PSW	PSL	L	GF	GA	GD	TPI	Qualification
1	Russia	3	3	0	0	0	86	20	66	83	Quarterfinals
2	China	3	3	0	0	0	52	12	40	81.4	Quarterfinals
3	Croatia	3	3	0	0	0	68	25	43	78.6	Quarterfinals
4	Canada	3	3	0	0	0	40	28	12	74.7	Quarterfinals
5	Great Britain	2	2	0	0	0	48	25	23	67.1	Quarterfinals
6	Portugal	2	1	0	0	1	30	33	−3	62.7	Quarterfinals
7	Turkey	2	1	0	0	1	29	27	2	61.4	Quarterfinals
8	Brazil	2	1	0	0	1	21	22	−1	56.6	Quarterfinals
9	Kazakhstan	3	1	0	0	2	28	35	−7	52.1	
10	Malta (H)	2	0	0	0	2	31	43	−12	48.7	
11	Argentina	3	1	0	0	2	36	62	−26	47.3	
12	Germany	3	0	0	0	3	13	53	−40	36.3	
13	Slovakia	2	0	0	0	2	21	53	−32	36.1	
14	Singapore	2	0	0	0	2	16	44	−28	34.6	
15	South Africa	3	0	0	0	3	24	61	−37	31.9	
—	~~Israel~~ (Note: Israel withdrew before the tournament.)	—	—	—	—	—	—	—	—	—	Withdrawn

Source: Microplustiming
Rules for classification: 1) Points; 2) Strength of opposition; 3) Head-to-head points; 4) Head-to-head goal difference; 5) Head-to-head goals scored; 6) Goal difference.
(H) Hosts

==== Day 1 ====
21 April 2026; 10:00	Report	China	17–6	Turkey	Tal-Qroqq Sports Complex, Msida; Referees: Hélène Painchaud (CAN), Sara Kontek (CRO)
21 April 2026; 10:00	Report	Score by quarters: 4–0, 2–4, 5–2, 6–0			Tal-Qroqq Sports Complex, Msida; Referees: Hélène Painchaud (CAN), Sara Kontek (CRO)
21 April 2026; 10:00	Report	four players 3	Goals	Yermakova 3	Tal-Qroqq Sports Complex, Msida; Referees: Hélène Painchaud (CAN), Sara Kontek (CRO)

21 April 2026; 11:30	Report	Great Britain	10–10; PSO: 0–3	Portugal	Tal-Qroqq Sports Complex, Msida; Referees: Ralf Müller (GER), Marcella Braga (BRA)
21 April 2026; 11:30	Report	Score by quarters: 2–3, 2–2, 1–3, 5–2			Tal-Qroqq Sports Complex, Msida; Referees: Ralf Müller (GER), Marcella Braga (BRA)
21 April 2026; 11:30	Report	four players 2	Goals	Pereira 4	Tal-Qroqq Sports Complex, Msida; Referees: Ralf Müller (GER), Marcella Braga (BRA)

21 April 2026; 13:00	Report	South Africa	8–11	Kazakhstan	Tal-Qroqq Sports Complex, Msida; Referees: Diana Dutilh (NED), Stefan Licari (MLT)
21 April 2026; 13:00	Report	Score by quarters: 0–1, 4–2, 1–4, 3–4			Tal-Qroqq Sports Complex, Msida; Referees: Diana Dutilh (NED), Stefan Licari (MLT)
21 April 2026; 13:00	Report	eight players 1	Goals	Vorontsova 3	Tal-Qroqq Sports Complex, Msida; Referees: Diana Dutilh (NED), Stefan Licari (MLT)

21 April 2026; 15:00	Report	Argentina	11–33	Russia	Tal-Qroqq Sports Complex, Msida; Referees: Viktor Salnichenko (KAZ), Fong Kong Wai (SGP)
21 April 2026; 15:00	Report	Score by quarters: 4–8, 1–7, 4–7, 2–11			Tal-Qroqq Sports Complex, Msida; Referees: Viktor Salnichenko (KAZ), Fong Kong Wai (SGP)
21 April 2026; 15:00	Report	Auliel, Bacigalupo 3	Goals	Lupinogina 11	Tal-Qroqq Sports Complex, Msida; Referees: Viktor Salnichenko (KAZ), Fong Kong Wai (SGP)

21 April 2026; 16:30	Report	Croatia	23–3	Slovakia	Tal-Qroqq Sports Complex, Msida; Referees: Jonathan Richards (GBR), Luis Alves (POR)
21 April 2026; 16:30	Report	Score by quarters: 4–2, 5–0, 8–1, 6–0			Tal-Qroqq Sports Complex, Msida; Referees: Jonathan Richards (GBR), Luis Alves (POR)
21 April 2026; 16:30	Report	Glas, Rožić 5	Goals	Sedláková 3	Tal-Qroqq Sports Complex, Msida; Referees: Jonathan Richards (GBR), Luis Alves (POR)

21 April 2026; 18:00	Report	Canada	13–8	Germany	Tal-Qroqq Sports Complex, Msida; Referees: Lee-Anne Stewart (RSA), Peter Radič (SVK)
21 April 2026; 18:00	Report	Score by quarters: 3–2, 2–1, 4–3, 4–2			Tal-Qroqq Sports Complex, Msida; Referees: Lee-Anne Stewart (RSA), Peter Radič (SVK)
21 April 2026; 18:00	Report	Mimides 6	Goals	Khmil 2	Tal-Qroqq Sports Complex, Msida; Referees: Lee-Anne Stewart (RSA), Peter Radič (SVK)

21 April 2026; 19:30	Report	Brazil	11–10	Malta	Tal-Qroqq Sports Complex, Msida; Referees: Ercan Türkkan (TUR), Agustin Pinski (ARG)
21 April 2026; 19:30	Report	Score by quarters: 4–5, 3–2, 2–2, 2–1			Tal-Qroqq Sports Complex, Msida; Referees: Ercan Türkkan (TUR), Agustin Pinski (ARG)
21 April 2026; 19:30	Report	Cavalcante, Ferreira 3	Goals	Borg, Bugelli 3	Tal-Qroqq Sports Complex, Msida; Referees: Ercan Türkkan (TUR), Agustin Pinski (ARG)

==== Day 2 ====
22 April 2026; 10:30	Report	China	21–5	Argentina	Tal-Qroqq Sports Complex, Msida; Referees: Lee-Anne Stewart (RSA), Luis Alves (POR)
22 April 2026; 10:30	Report	Score by quarters: 5–1, 3–1, 7–1, 6–2			Tal-Qroqq Sports Complex, Msida; Referees: Lee-Anne Stewart (RSA), Luis Alves (POR)
22 April 2026; 10:30	Report	Xie 6	Goals	Agnesina 2	Tal-Qroqq Sports Complex, Msida; Referees: Lee-Anne Stewart (RSA), Luis Alves (POR)

22 April 2026; 12:00	Report	Canada	12–10	Brazil	Tal-Qroqq Sports Complex, Msida; Referees: Diana Dutilh (NED), Agustin Pinski (ARG)
22 April 2026; 12:00	Report	Score by quarters: 3–3, 4–2, 3–1, 2–4			Tal-Qroqq Sports Complex, Msida; Referees: Diana Dutilh (NED), Agustin Pinski (ARG)
22 April 2026; 12:00	Report	Christmas 5	Goals	Belorio 4	Tal-Qroqq Sports Complex, Msida; Referees: Diana Dutilh (NED), Agustin Pinski (ARG)

22 April 2026; 13:30	Report	Great Britain	21–6	Singapore	Tal-Qroqq Sports Complex, Msida; Referees: Pang Yang (CHN), Stefan Licari (MLT)
22 April 2026; 13:30	Report	Score by quarters: 7–3, 5–2, 2–1, 7–0			Tal-Qroqq Sports Complex, Msida; Referees: Pang Yang (CHN), Stefan Licari (MLT)
22 April 2026; 13:30	Report	Falvey 7	Goals	Lee, C. Tio 2	Tal-Qroqq Sports Complex, Msida; Referees: Pang Yang (CHN), Stefan Licari (MLT)

22 April 2026; 15:00	Report	South Africa	11–23	Croatia	Tal-Qroqq Sports Complex, Msida; Referees: Peter Radič (SVK), Ralf Müller (GER)
22 April 2026; 15:00	Report	Score by quarters: 2–7, 3–4, 2–7, 4–5			Tal-Qroqq Sports Complex, Msida; Referees: Peter Radič (SVK), Ralf Müller (GER)
22 April 2026; 15:00	Report	Eccles, January 2	Goals	Rožić 7	Tal-Qroqq Sports Complex, Msida; Referees: Peter Radič (SVK), Ralf Müller (GER)

22 April 2026; 16:30	Report	Portugal	10–8	Kazakhstan	Tal-Qroqq Sports Complex, Msida; Referees: Sara Kontek (CRO), Ercan Türkkan (TUR)
22 April 2026; 16:30	Report	Score by quarters: 0–1, 5–0, 4–5, 1–2			Tal-Qroqq Sports Complex, Msida; Referees: Sara Kontek (CRO), Ercan Türkkan (TUR)
22 April 2026; 16:30	Report	Machado 3	Goals	Druzhinina 3	Tal-Qroqq Sports Complex, Msida; Referees: Sara Kontek (CRO), Ercan Türkkan (TUR)

22 April 2026; 18:00	Report	Russia	26–4	Germany	Tal-Qroqq Sports Complex, Msida; Referees: Hélène Painchaud (CAN), Jonathan Richards (GBR)
22 April 2026; 18:00	Report	Score by quarters: 7–3, 6–0, 8–1, 5–0			Tal-Qroqq Sports Complex, Msida; Referees: Hélène Painchaud (CAN), Jonathan Richards (GBR)
22 April 2026; 18:00	Report	Markoch 4	Goals	Ludwig 2	Tal-Qroqq Sports Complex, Msida; Referees: Hélène Painchaud (CAN), Jonathan Richards (GBR)

22 April 2026; 19:30	Report	Malta	10–10; PSO: 3–1	Slovakia	Tal-Qroqq Sports Complex, Msida; Referees: Viktor Salnichenko (KAZ), Marcella Braga (BRA)
22 April 2026; 19:30	Report	Score by quarters: 4–5, 2–3, 3–0, 1–2			Tal-Qroqq Sports Complex, Msida; Referees: Viktor Salnichenko (KAZ), Marcella Braga (BRA)
22 April 2026; 19:30	Report	Borg 4	Goals	Telypko 4	Tal-Qroqq Sports Complex, Msida; Referees: Viktor Salnichenko (KAZ), Marcella Braga (BRA)

==== Day 3 ====
23 April 2026; 10:00	Report	Canada	15–10	Portugal	Tal-Qroqq Sports Complex, Msida; Referees: Pang Yang (CHN), Jonathan Richards (GBR)
23 April 2026; 10:00	Report	Score by quarters: 5–5, 2–1, 4–2, 4–2			Tal-Qroqq Sports Complex, Msida; Referees: Pang Yang (CHN), Jonathan Richards (GBR)
23 April 2026; 10:00	Report	Christmas 6	Goals	Machado 4	Tal-Qroqq Sports Complex, Msida; Referees: Pang Yang (CHN), Jonathan Richards (GBR)

23 April 2026; 11:30	Report	Croatia	22–11	Malta	Tal-Qroqq Sports Complex, Msida; Referees: Lee-Anne Stewart (RSA), Fong Kong Wai (SGP)
23 April 2026; 11:30	Report	Score by quarters: 7–1, 2–1, 7–4, 6–5			Tal-Qroqq Sports Complex, Msida; Referees: Lee-Anne Stewart (RSA), Fong Kong Wai (SGP)
23 April 2026; 11:30	Report	Rožić 8	Goals	Perici Ferrante 4	Tal-Qroqq Sports Complex, Msida; Referees: Lee-Anne Stewart (RSA), Fong Kong Wai (SGP)

23 April 2026; 13:00	Report	China	14–1	Germany	Tal-Qroqq Sports Complex, Msida; Referees: Ercan Türkkan (TUR), Agustin Pinski (ARG)
23 April 2026; 13:00	Report	Score by quarters: 1–1, 4–0, 3–0, 6–0			Tal-Qroqq Sports Complex, Msida; Referees: Ercan Türkkan (TUR), Agustin Pinski (ARG)
23 April 2026; 13:00	Report	Xie, Yan S. 3	Goals	Ludwig 1	Tal-Qroqq Sports Complex, Msida; Referees: Ercan Türkkan (TUR), Agustin Pinski (ARG)

23 April 2026; 15:00	Report	Great Britain	17–9	Kazakhstan	Tal-Qroqq Sports Complex, Msida; Referees: Hélène Painchaud (CAN), Peter Radič (SVK)
23 April 2026; 15:00	Report	Score by quarters: 5–2, 4–1, 5–1, 3–5			Tal-Qroqq Sports Complex, Msida; Referees: Hélène Painchaud (CAN), Peter Radič (SVK)
23 April 2026; 15:00	Report	Cutler, Falvey 5	Goals	three players 2	Tal-Qroqq Sports Complex, Msida; Referees: Hélène Painchaud (CAN), Peter Radič (SVK)

23 April 2026; 16:30	Report	South Africa	5–27	Russia	Tal-Qroqq Sports Complex, Msida; Referees: Marcella Braga (BRA), Luis Alves (POR)
23 April 2026; 16:30	Report	Score by quarters: 2–7, 1–8, 0–7, 2–5			Tal-Qroqq Sports Complex, Msida; Referees: Marcella Braga (BRA), Luis Alves (POR)
23 April 2026; 16:30	Report	January 2	Goals	Nechaeva 6	Tal-Qroqq Sports Complex, Msida; Referees: Marcella Braga (BRA), Luis Alves (POR)

23 April 2026; 18:00	Report	Argentina	20–8	Slovakia	Tal-Qroqq Sports Complex, Msida; Referees: Sara Kontek (CRO), Stefan Licari (MLT)
23 April 2026; 18:00	Report	Score by quarters: 8–2, 5–2, 4–1, 3–3			Tal-Qroqq Sports Complex, Msida; Referees: Sara Kontek (CRO), Stefan Licari (MLT)
23 April 2026; 18:00	Report	Mastronardi 6	Goals	Baranovičová 2	Tal-Qroqq Sports Complex, Msida; Referees: Sara Kontek (CRO), Stefan Licari (MLT)

23 April 2026; 19:30	Report	Singapore	10–23	Turkey	Tal-Qroqq Sports Complex, Msida; Referees: Viktor Salnichenko (KAZ), Ralf Müller (GER)
23 April 2026; 19:30	Report	Score by quarters: 4–5, 4–5, 1–6, 1–7			Tal-Qroqq Sports Complex, Msida; Referees: Viktor Salnichenko (KAZ), Ralf Müller (GER)
23 April 2026; 19:30	Report	Lee 5	Goals	Ivanova 6	Tal-Qroqq Sports Complex, Msida; Referees: Viktor Salnichenko (KAZ), Ralf Müller (GER)

=== Final phase ===
==== Bracket ====
Quarter-finals
24 April
1 Russia	22
8 Brazil	5
24 April
4 Canada	14
5 Great Britain	9
24 April
2 China	18
7 Turkey	5
24 April
3 Croatia	18
6 Portugal	7

Semi-finals
25 April
1 Russia	24
4 Canada	6
25 April
2 China	23
3 Croatia	11

Final
26 April
1 Russia	18
2 China	17
Third place
26 April
4 Canada	19
3 Croatia	12

Fifth place bracket

5–8th place semifinals
25 April
8 Brazil	14
5 Great Britain	13
25 April
7 Turkey	16
6 Portugal	6

Fifth place
26 April
8 Brazil	12
7 Turkey	11
Seventh place
26 April
5 Great Britain	13
6 Portugal	12

Ninth place bracket

9–15th place quarterfinals
24 April
12 Germany	17
13 Slovakia	7
24 April
10 Malta	14
15 South Africa	8
24 April
11 Argentina	20
14 Singapore	6

9–12th place semifinals
25 April
9 Kazakhstan	7
12 Germany	12
25 April
10 Malta	9
11 Argentina	7

Ninth place
26 April
12 Germany	19
10 Malta	9
Eleventh place
26 April
9 Kazakhstan	11 (3)
11 Argentina (PSO)	11 (5)

13th place bracket

13–15th place semifinal
25 April
15 South Africa	12
14 Singapore	11

13th place
26 April
13 Slovakia	9
15 South Africa	10

==== 9–15th place quarterfinals ====
24 April 2026; 10:00	Report	Argentina	20–6	Singapore	Tal-Qroqq Sports Complex, Msida; Referees: Viktor Salnichenko (KAZ), Jonathan Richards (GBR)
24 April 2026; 10:00	Report	Score by quarters: 8–1, 4–1, 3–2, 5–2			Tal-Qroqq Sports Complex, Msida; Referees: Viktor Salnichenko (KAZ), Jonathan Richards (GBR)
24 April 2026; 10:00	Report	Perasso 4	Goals	Lim, C. Tio 2	Tal-Qroqq Sports Complex, Msida; Referees: Viktor Salnichenko (KAZ), Jonathan Richards (GBR)

24 April 2026; 11:30	Report	Germany	17–7	Slovakia	Tal-Qroqq Sports Complex, Msida; Referees: Ercan Türkkan (TUR), Fong Kong Wai (SGP)
24 April 2026; 11:30	Report	Score by quarters: 4–2, 4–1, 4–4, 5–0			Tal-Qroqq Sports Complex, Msida; Referees: Ercan Türkkan (TUR), Fong Kong Wai (SGP)
24 April 2026; 11:30	Report	Khmil 4	Goals	Baranovičová, Telypko 2	Tal-Qroqq Sports Complex, Msida; Referees: Ercan Türkkan (TUR), Fong Kong Wai (SGP)

24 April 2026; 19:30	Report	Malta	14–8	South Africa	Tal-Qroqq Sports Complex, Msida; Referees: Diana Dutilh (NED), Marcella Braga (BRA)
24 April 2026; 19:30	Report	Score by quarters: 5–3, 3–2, 2–1, 4–2			Tal-Qroqq Sports Complex, Msida; Referees: Diana Dutilh (NED), Marcella Braga (BRA)
24 April 2026; 19:30	Report	Borg 4	Goals	Banks 4	Tal-Qroqq Sports Complex, Msida; Referees: Diana Dutilh (NED), Marcella Braga (BRA)

==== Quarterfinals ====
24 April 2026; 13:00	Report	Russia	22–5	Brazil	Tal-Qroqq Sports Complex, Msida; Referees: Sara Kontek (CRO), Pang Yang(CHN)
24 April 2026; 13:00	Report	Score by quarters: 3–0, 7–3, 4–2, 8–0			Tal-Qroqq Sports Complex, Msida; Referees: Sara Kontek (CRO), Pang Yang(CHN)
24 April 2026; 13:00	Report	Markoch 7	Goals	Belorio 2	Tal-Qroqq Sports Complex, Msida; Referees: Sara Kontek (CRO), Pang Yang(CHN)

24 April 2026; 15:00	Report	China	18–5	Turkey	Tal-Qroqq Sports Complex, Msida; Referees: Hélène Painchaud (CAN), Luis Alves (POR)
24 April 2026; 15:00	Report	Score by quarters: 7–0, 2–1, 4–1, 5–3			Tal-Qroqq Sports Complex, Msida; Referees: Hélène Painchaud (CAN), Luis Alves (POR)
24 April 2026; 15:00	Report	Wang X. 4	Goals	five players 1	Tal-Qroqq Sports Complex, Msida; Referees: Hélène Painchaud (CAN), Luis Alves (POR)

24 April 2026; 16:30	Report	Croatia	18–7	Portugal	Tal-Qroqq Sports Complex, Msida; Referees: Lee-Anne Stewart (RSA), Ralf Müller (GER)
24 April 2026; 16:30	Report	Score by quarters: 5–3, 3–2, 4–1, 6–1			Tal-Qroqq Sports Complex, Msida; Referees: Lee-Anne Stewart (RSA), Ralf Müller (GER)
24 April 2026; 16:30	Report	Glas 6	Goals	Machado 3	Tal-Qroqq Sports Complex, Msida; Referees: Lee-Anne Stewart (RSA), Ralf Müller (GER)

24 April 2026; 18:00	Report	Canada	14–9	Great Britain	Tal-Qroqq Sports Complex, Msida; Referees: Peter Radič (SVK), Agustin Pinski (ARG)
24 April 2026; 18:00	Report	Score by quarters: 3–1, 4–0, 6–2, 1–6			Tal-Qroqq Sports Complex, Msida; Referees: Peter Radič (SVK), Agustin Pinski (ARG)
24 April 2026; 18:00	Report	Guèvremont, Pineda-McLean 3	Goals	Cutler 5	Tal-Qroqq Sports Complex, Msida; Referees: Peter Radič (SVK), Agustin Pinski (ARG)

==== 13–15th place semifinal ====
25 April 2026; 10:00	Report	South Africa	12–11	Singapore	Tal-Qroqq Sports Complex, Msida; Referees: Hélène Painchaud (CAN), Luis Alves (POR)
25 April 2026; 10:00	Report	Score by quarters: 3–0, 3–2, 2–2, 4–7			Tal-Qroqq Sports Complex, Msida; Referees: Hélène Painchaud (CAN), Luis Alves (POR)
25 April 2026; 10:00	Report	Eccles 3	Goals	Lim 4	Tal-Qroqq Sports Complex, Msida; Referees: Hélène Painchaud (CAN), Luis Alves (POR)

==== 9–12th place semifinals ====
25 April 2026; 11:30	Report	Kazakhstan	7–12	Germany	Tal-Qroqq Sports Complex, Msida; Referees: Diana Dutilh (NED), Peter Radič (SVK)
25 April 2026; 11:30	Report	Score by quarters: 1–4, 3–1, 1–4, 2–3			Tal-Qroqq Sports Complex, Msida; Referees: Diana Dutilh (NED), Peter Radič (SVK)
25 April 2026; 11:30	Report	Druzhinina 2	Goals	three players 3	Tal-Qroqq Sports Complex, Msida; Referees: Diana Dutilh (NED), Peter Radič (SVK)

25 April 2026; 19:30	Report	Malta	9–7	Argentina	Tal-Qroqq Sports Complex, Msida; Referees: Jonathan Richards (GBR), Fong Kong Wai (SGP)
25 April 2026; 19:30	Report	Score by quarters: 3–2, 0–1, 3–1, 3–3			Tal-Qroqq Sports Complex, Msida; Referees: Jonathan Richards (GBR), Fong Kong Wai (SGP)
25 April 2026; 19:30	Report	Borg 6	Goals	Bacigalupo 3	Tal-Qroqq Sports Complex, Msida; Referees: Jonathan Richards (GBR), Fong Kong Wai (SGP)

==== 5–8th place semifinals ====
25 April 2026; 13:00	Report	Brazil	14–13	Great Britain	Tal-Qroqq Sports Complex, Msida; Referees: Lee-Anne Stewart (RSA), Stefan Licari (MLT)
25 April 2026; 13:00	Report	Score by quarters: 1–3, 2–5, 7–1, 4–4			Tal-Qroqq Sports Complex, Msida; Referees: Lee-Anne Stewart (RSA), Stefan Licari (MLT)
25 April 2026; 13:00	Report	Nascimento 5	Goals	Peters 4	Tal-Qroqq Sports Complex, Msida; Referees: Lee-Anne Stewart (RSA), Stefan Licari (MLT)

25 April 2026; 15:00	Report	Turkey	16–6	Portugal	Tal-Qroqq Sports Complex, Msida; Referees: Sara Kontek (CRO), Pang Yang (CHN)
25 April 2026; 15:00	Report	Score by quarters: 2–1, 4–1, 7–2, 3–2			Tal-Qroqq Sports Complex, Msida; Referees: Sara Kontek (CRO), Pang Yang (CHN)
25 April 2026; 15:00	Report	Yermakova 5	Goals	Lousa 3	Tal-Qroqq Sports Complex, Msida; Referees: Sara Kontek (CRO), Pang Yang (CHN)

==== Semifinals ====
25 April 2026; 16:30	Report	Russia	24–6	Canada	Tal-Qroqq Sports Complex, Msida; Referees: Marcella Braga (BRA), Ralf Müller (GER)
25 April 2026; 16:30	Report	Score by quarters: 5–1, 8–2, 7–1, 4–2			Tal-Qroqq Sports Complex, Msida; Referees: Marcella Braga (BRA), Ralf Müller (GER)
25 April 2026; 16:30	Report	Makarova 5	Goals	Mady, Wright 2	Tal-Qroqq Sports Complex, Msida; Referees: Marcella Braga (BRA), Ralf Müller (GER)

25 April 2026; 18:00	Report	China	23–11	Croatia	Tal-Qroqq Sports Complex, Msida; Referees: Ercan Türkkan (TUR), Agustin Pinski (ARG)
25 April 2026; 18:00	Report	Score by quarters: 3–3, 10–1, 6–2, 4–5			Tal-Qroqq Sports Complex, Msida; Referees: Ercan Türkkan (TUR), Agustin Pinski (ARG)
25 April 2026; 18:00	Report	Yan S. 7	Goals	Glas 4	Tal-Qroqq Sports Complex, Msida; Referees: Ercan Türkkan (TUR), Agustin Pinski (ARG)

==== 13th place game ====
26 April 2026; 10:00	Report	Slovakia	9–10	South Africa	Tal-Qroqq Sports Complex, Msida; Referees: Luis Alves (POR), Fong Kong Wai (SGP)
26 April 2026; 10:00	Report	Score by quarters: 1–4, 1–3, 5–1, 2–2			Tal-Qroqq Sports Complex, Msida; Referees: Luis Alves (POR), Fong Kong Wai (SGP)
26 April 2026; 10:00	Report	Baranovičová, Sedláková 4	Goals	Banks 4	Tal-Qroqq Sports Complex, Msida; Referees: Luis Alves (POR), Fong Kong Wai (SGP)

==== Eleventh place game ====
26 April 2026; 11:30	Report	Kazakhstan	11–11; PSO: 3–5	Argentina	Tal-Qroqq Sports Complex, Msida; Referees: Peter Radič (SVK), Ralf Müller (GER)
26 April 2026; 11:30	Report	Score by quarters: 2–4, 2–2, 3–3, 4–2			Tal-Qroqq Sports Complex, Msida; Referees: Peter Radič (SVK), Ralf Müller (GER)
26 April 2026; 11:30	Report	Druzhinina 5	Goals	Auliel, Bacigalupo 3	Tal-Qroqq Sports Complex, Msida; Referees: Peter Radič (SVK), Ralf Müller (GER)

==== Ninth place game ====
26 April 2026; 13:00	Report	Germany	19–9	Malta	Tal-Qroqq Sports Complex, Msida; Referees: Hélène Painchaud (CAN), Viktor Salnichenko (KAZ)
26 April 2026; 13:00	Report	Score by quarters: 5–3, 4–1, 5–4, 5–1			Tal-Qroqq Sports Complex, Msida; Referees: Hélène Painchaud (CAN), Viktor Salnichenko (KAZ)
26 April 2026; 13:00	Report	Vosseberg 5	Goals	Borg 4	Tal-Qroqq Sports Complex, Msida; Referees: Hélène Painchaud (CAN), Viktor Salnichenko (KAZ)

==== Seventh place game ====
26 April 2026; 15:00	Report	Great Britain	13–12	Portugal	Tal-Qroqq Sports Complex, Msida; Referees: Diana Dutilh (NED), Stefan Licari (MLT)
26 April 2026; 15:00	Report	Score by quarters: 3–4, 3–1, 6–3, 1–4			Tal-Qroqq Sports Complex, Msida; Referees: Diana Dutilh (NED), Stefan Licari (MLT)
26 April 2026; 15:00	Report	three players 3	Goals	Machado 4	Tal-Qroqq Sports Complex, Msida; Referees: Diana Dutilh (NED), Stefan Licari (MLT)

==== Fifth place game ====
26 April 2026; 16:30	Report	Brazil	12–11	Turkey	Tal-Qroqq Sports Complex, Msida; Referees: Lee-Anne Stewart (RSA), Jonathan Richards (GBR)
26 April 2026; 16:30	Report	Score by quarters: 2–2, 3–5, 3–2, 4–2			Tal-Qroqq Sports Complex, Msida; Referees: Lee-Anne Stewart (RSA), Jonathan Richards (GBR)
26 April 2026; 16:30	Report	Belorio 5	Goals	Molnar 5	Tal-Qroqq Sports Complex, Msida; Referees: Lee-Anne Stewart (RSA), Jonathan Richards (GBR)

==== Third place game ====
26 April 2026; 18:00	Report	Canada	19–12	Croatia	Tal-Qroqq Sports Complex, Msida; Referees: Marcella Braga (BRA), Pang Yang (CHN)
26 April 2026; 18:00	Report	Score by quarters: 6–2, 4–4, 4–2, 5–4			Tal-Qroqq Sports Complex, Msida; Referees: Marcella Braga (BRA), Pang Yang (CHN)
26 April 2026; 18:00	Report	Christmas, Wright 4	Goals	three players 3	Tal-Qroqq Sports Complex, Msida; Referees: Marcella Braga (BRA), Pang Yang (CHN)

==== Final ====
26 April 2026; 19:30	Report	Russia	18–17	China	Tal-Qroqq Sports Complex, Msida; Referees: Sara Kontek (CRO), Ercan Türkkan (TUR)
26 April 2026; 19:30	Report	Score by quarters: 4–3, 4–4, 4–6, 6–4			Tal-Qroqq Sports Complex, Msida; Referees: Sara Kontek (CRO), Ercan Türkkan (TUR)
26 April 2026; 19:30	Report	Prokofyeva 4	Goals	Shao 4	Tal-Qroqq Sports Complex, Msida; Referees: Sara Kontek (CRO), Ercan Türkkan (TUR)

== Super final ==
2026 World Aquatics Women's Water Polo World Cup
Tournament details
- Host country: Australia
- Venue: 1
- Dates: 22–26 July
- Teams: 8

Final positions
- Champions: United States (6th title)
- Runners-up: Spain
- Third place: Australia
- Fourth place: Russia

Tournament statistics
- Matches played: 12
- Goals scored: 242 (20.17 per match)
- Top scorers: (United States) Emily Ausmus (11 goals)

Awards
- Best player: (Australia) Matilda Kearns
- Best goalkeeper: (United States) Amanda Longan

Official website
- www.worldaquatics.com

The tournament took place between 22 and 26 July 2026 in Sydney, Australia.

=== Bracket ===
Quarter-finals
22 July
United States	14
China	8
22 July
Italy	14
Australia	15
22 July
Netherlands	6
Russia	11
22 July
Spain	8
Hungary	7

Semi-finals
24 July
United States	10
Australia	6
24 July
Russia	10 (3)
Spain (PSO)	10 (5)

Final
26 July
United States	13
Spain	9
Third place
26 July
Australia	12
Russia	9

Fifth place bracket

5–8th place semifinals
24 July
China	10
Italy	11
24 July
Netherlands (PSO)	11 (5)
Hungary	11 (4)

Fifth place
25 July
Italy	5
Netherlands	12
Seventh place
25 July
China	8
Hungary	12

All times are local (UTC+10).

=== Quarterfinals ===
22 July 2026; 15:00	Report	United States	14–8	China	Sydney Olympic Park Aquatic Centre, Sydney; Referees: Natali Markopoulou (GRE), Vladimir Golikov (RUS)
22 July 2026; 15:00	Report	Score by quarters: 5–4, 2–0, 3–0, 4–4			Sydney Olympic Park Aquatic Centre, Sydney; Referees: Natali Markopoulou (GRE), Vladimir Golikov (RUS)
22 July 2026; 15:00	Report	Ausmus 4	Goals	Shao 2	Sydney Olympic Park Aquatic Centre, Sydney; Referees: Natali Markopoulou (GRE), Vladimir Golikov (RUS)

22 July 2026; 16:45	Report	Netherlands	6–11	Russia	Sydney Olympic Park Aquatic Centre, Sydney; Referees: Ash Kaesler (AUS), Giuliana Nicolosi (ITA)
22 July 2026; 16:45	Report	Score by quarters: 2–2, 1–2, 1–2, 2–5			Sydney Olympic Park Aquatic Centre, Sydney; Referees: Ash Kaesler (AUS), Giuliana Nicolosi (ITA)
22 July 2026; 16:45	Report	three players 2	Goals	Makarova 3	Sydney Olympic Park Aquatic Centre, Sydney; Referees: Ash Kaesler (AUS), Giuliana Nicolosi (ITA)

22 July 2026; 18:30	Report	Italy	14–15	Australia	Sydney Olympic Park Aquatic Centre, Sydney; Referees: Nikolett Sajben (HUN), Alex Márquez (ESP)
22 July 2026; 18:30	Report	Score by quarters: 3–3, 4–5, 4–3, 3–4			Sydney Olympic Park Aquatic Centre, Sydney; Referees: Nikolett Sajben (HUN), Alex Márquez (ESP)
22 July 2026; 18:30	Report	Bettini 4	Goals	Kearns 4	Sydney Olympic Park Aquatic Centre, Sydney; Referees: Nikolett Sajben (HUN), Alex Márquez (ESP)

22 July 2026; 20:15	Report	Spain	8–7	Hungary	Sydney Olympic Park Aquatic Centre, Sydney; Referees: Jennifer McCall (USA), Sara Kontek (CRO)
22 July 2026; 20:15	Report	Score by quarters: 2–2, 3–2, 1–2, 2–1			Sydney Olympic Park Aquatic Centre, Sydney; Referees: Jennifer McCall (USA), Sara Kontek (CRO)
22 July 2026; 20:15	Report	Camús 2	Goals	Hajdú 3	Sydney Olympic Park Aquatic Centre, Sydney; Referees: Jennifer McCall (USA), Sara Kontek (CRO)

=== 5–8th place semifinals ===
24 July 2026; 11:30	Report	China	10–11	Italy	Sydney Olympic Park Aquatic Centre, Sydney; Referees: Jennifer McCall (USA), Ash Kaesler (AUS)
24 July 2026; 11:30	Report	Score by quarters: 2–4, 2–4, 4–1, 2–2			Sydney Olympic Park Aquatic Centre, Sydney; Referees: Jennifer McCall (USA), Ash Kaesler (AUS)
24 July 2026; 11:30	Report	Yan S. 5	Goals	Bettini 3	Sydney Olympic Park Aquatic Centre, Sydney; Referees: Jennifer McCall (USA), Ash Kaesler (AUS)

24 July 2026; 13:15	Report	Netherlands	11–11; PSO: 5–4	Hungary	Sydney Olympic Park Aquatic Centre, Sydney; Referees: Vladimir Golikov (RUS), Alex Márquez (ESP)
24 July 2026; 13:15	Report	Score by quarters: 3–3, 5–2, 2–2, 1–4			Sydney Olympic Park Aquatic Centre, Sydney; Referees: Vladimir Golikov (RUS), Alex Márquez (ESP)
24 July 2026; 13:15	Report	four players 2	Goals	Garda 4	Sydney Olympic Park Aquatic Centre, Sydney; Referees: Vladimir Golikov (RUS), Alex Márquez (ESP)

=== Semifinals ===
24 July 2026; 18:30	Report	United States	10–6	Australia	Sydney Olympic Park Aquatic Centre, Sydney; Referees: Nikolett Sajben (HUN), Sara Kontek (CRO)
24 July 2026; 18:30	Report	Score by quarters: 2–0, 3–4, 4–2, 1–0			Sydney Olympic Park Aquatic Centre, Sydney; Referees: Nikolett Sajben (HUN), Sara Kontek (CRO)
24 July 2026; 18:30	Report	Roemer 2	Goals	Halligan, Hearn 2	Sydney Olympic Park Aquatic Centre, Sydney; Referees: Nikolett Sajben (HUN), Sara Kontek (CRO)

24 July 2026; 20:15	Report	Russia	10–10; PSO: 3–5	Spain	Sydney Olympic Park Aquatic Centre, Sydney; Referees: Natalia Markopoulou (GRE), Giuliana Nicolosi (ITA)
24 July 2026; 20:15	Report	Score by quarters: 3–3, 1–3, 2–2, 4–2			Sydney Olympic Park Aquatic Centre, Sydney; Referees: Natalia Markopoulou (GRE), Giuliana Nicolosi (ITA)
24 July 2026; 20:15	Report	four players 2	Goals	Ruiz 3	Sydney Olympic Park Aquatic Centre, Sydney; Referees: Natalia Markopoulou (GRE), Giuliana Nicolosi (ITA)

=== Seventh place game ===
25 July 2026; 11:30	Report	China	8–12	Hungary	Sydney Olympic Park Aquatic Centre, Sydney; Referees: Natalia Markopoulou (GRE), Sara Kontek (CRO)
25 July 2026; 11:30	Report	Score by quarters: 2–4, 2–3, 3–3, 1–2			Sydney Olympic Park Aquatic Centre, Sydney; Referees: Natalia Markopoulou (GRE), Sara Kontek (CRO)
25 July 2026; 11:30	Report	Xie 2	Goals	Hajdú 3	Sydney Olympic Park Aquatic Centre, Sydney; Referees: Natalia Markopoulou (GRE), Sara Kontek (CRO)

=== Fifth place game ===
25 July 2026; 13:15	Report	Italy	5–12	Netherlands	Sydney Olympic Park Aquatic Centre, Sydney; Referees: Nicholas Hodgers (AUS), Vladimir Golikov (RUS)
25 July 2026; 13:15	Report	Score by quarters: 2–4, 1–2, 1–4, 1–2			Sydney Olympic Park Aquatic Centre, Sydney; Referees: Nicholas Hodgers (AUS), Vladimir Golikov (RUS)
25 July 2026; 13:15	Report	Bettini, Cocchiere 2	Goals	Moolhuijzen 5	Sydney Olympic Park Aquatic Centre, Sydney; Referees: Nicholas Hodgers (AUS), Vladimir Golikov (RUS)

=== Third place game ===
26 July 2026; 12:45	Report	Australia	12–9	Russia	Sydney Olympic Park Aquatic Centre, Sydney; Referees: Natalia Markopoulou (GRE), Alex Márquez (ESP)
26 July 2026; 12:45	Report	Score by quarters: 3–1, 3–3, 3–3, 3–2			Sydney Olympic Park Aquatic Centre, Sydney; Referees: Natalia Markopoulou (GRE), Alex Márquez (ESP)
26 July 2026; 12:45	Report	Williams 4	Goals	Makarova 4	Sydney Olympic Park Aquatic Centre, Sydney; Referees: Natalia Markopoulou (GRE), Alex Márquez (ESP)

=== Final ===
26 July 2026; 16:15	Report	United States	13–9	Spain	Sydney Olympic Park Aquatic Centre, Sydney; Referees: Giuliana Nicolosi (ITA), Nikolett Sajben (HUN)
26 July 2026; 16:15	Report	Score by quarters: 4–3, 3–2, 4–4, 2–0			Sydney Olympic Park Aquatic Centre, Sydney; Referees: Giuliana Nicolosi (ITA), Nikolett Sajben (HUN)
26 July 2026; 16:15	Report	Ausmus 6	Goals	three players 2	Sydney Olympic Park Aquatic Centre, Sydney; Referees: Giuliana Nicolosi (ITA), Nikolett Sajben (HUN)

== Final standings ==
Rank	Team
Gold medal	United States
Silver medal	Spain
Bronze medal	Australia
4	Russia
5	Netherlands
6	Italy
7	Hungary
8	China

- The United States, Spain and Australia qualified for the 2027 World Championship.

== Awards ==
The following individual awards were announced by World Aquatics following the Super Final:

Award	Recipient
Most valuable player	(Australia) Matilda Kearns
Best goalkeeper	(United States) Amanda Longan
Best defender	(Spain) Paula Crespí

== See also ==
- 2026 World Aquatics Men's Water Polo World Cup
