= Elena Ruiz =

Spanish water polo player (born 2004)

Personal information
- Full name: Elena Ruiz Barril
- Born: 29 October 2004 (age 21) Rubí, Spain
- Height: 1.70 m (5 ft 7 in)
- Weight: 59 kg (130 lb)

Sport
- Sport: Water polo
- Handedness: R
- Position: Driver
- Current club: CN Rubí
- Number: 5
National team
- Years: Team
- 2021–: Spain
Medal record
Women's water polo
Representing Spain
Olympic Games
Gold medal – first place	2024 Paris	Team
Silver medal – second place	2020 Tokyo	Team
World Championships
Silver medal – second place	2023 Fukuoka	Team
Bronze medal – third place	2024 Doha	Team
Bronze medal – third place	2025 Singapore	Team
European Championships
Gold medal – first place	2022 Split
Silver medal – second place	2024 Eindhoven
World Cup
Silver medal – second place	2026 Sydney
Bronze medal – third place	2023 Long Beach

Elena Ruiz Barril (born 29 October 2004) is a Spanish water polo player who won the silver medal with the Spain women's national water polo team at the 2020 Summer Olympics celebrated in Tokyo, Japan.

== See also ==
- Spain women's Olympic water polo team records and statistics
- List of Olympic medalists in water polo (women)
