= Deng Zewen =

Chinese water polo player (born 1997)

Personal information
- Nationality: China
- Born: 6 February 1997 (age 29)
- Height: 1.77 m (5 ft 10 in)

Sport
- Sport: Water polo
Medal record
Representing China
Asian Games
| Gold medal – first place | 2022 Hangzhou | Team competition |

Deng Zewen (born 6 February 1997) is a Chinese water polo player. She competed in the 2020 Summer Olympics.
