= Emma Wright =

Canadian water polo player (born 1996)

Personal information
- National team: Canada women's waterpolo team
- Born: November 16, 1996 (age 30) Lindsay, Ontario
- Height: 180 cm (5 ft 11 in)
- Weight: 82 kg (181 lb)

Sport
- Position: Lefty/Utility
- Club: Shadow Water Polo
Medal record
Representing Canada
Pan American Games
Silver medal – second place	2015 Toronto	Team
Silver medal – second place	2019 Lima	Team
Silver medal – second place	2023 Santiago	Team

Emma Wright (born November 16, 1996) is a Canadian water polo player. She plays for the Canadian national women's water polo team and played collegiately at the University of California, Berkeley.

== Career highlights ==
=== Youth competitor ===
Event	Rank
2011 Junior World Championships	9th
2012 Youth World Championships	5th
2012 Junior Pan American Games	Silver
2013 Junior Pan American Games	Gold
2013 Junior World Championships	9th
2014 FINA Youth World Championships	Silver
2014 Junior Pan American Games	Bronze

=== Senior competitor ===
Event	Rank
2012 Pan American Games	Silver
2012 FINA World League Super Final	7th
2013 FINA World League Super Final	8th
2014 Junior Pan Am Games	Bronze
2014 FINA World League Super Final	6th
2015 Pan American Games	Silver
2015 FINA World Championships	11th
2017 FINA World League	Silver
2017 FINA World Championships	4th
2018 FINA World Cup	6th
2018 FINA World League Super Final	4th
2019 FINA World League Super Final	7th
2019 Pan American Games	Silver
2019 FINA World Championships	9th
2021 FINA World League	4th

== 2020 Tokyo Summer Olympics ==
One of 371 Canadian athletes competing, Wright scored seven goals at her Olympic debut at the 2020 Summer Olympics in Tokyo, where Team Canada finished in 7th place.

== Personal life ==
Wright started playing water polo at age 9. She attends the University of California, Berkeley.

Her older sister Claire also plays for Team Canada and was a member of the Tokyo 2020 Olympic water polo team. Her uncle Jeff Beukeboom played in the NHL for the New York Rangers and Edmonton Oilers.
