= Water polo at the 2024 Summer Olympics – Women's tournament =

Women's water polo at the Games of the XXXIII Olympiad

Tournament details
- Host country: France
- City: Paris
- Venue(s): Paris Aquatic Centre; Paris La Défense Arena
- Dates: 27 July – 10 August
- Teams: 10 (from 4 confederations)
- Competitors: 120

Final positions
- Champions: Spain (1st title)
- Runners-up: Australia
- Third place: Netherlands
- Fourth place: United States

Tournament statistics
- Matches: 32
- Goals scored: 638 (19.94 per match)
- Top scorer(s): (Australia) Alice Williams (21 goals)

The women's tournament of water polo at the 2024 Summer Olympics at Paris, France was held from 27 July to 10 August 2024. It was held at the Paris Aquatic Centre and Paris La Défense Arena. It is the seventh official appearance of the tournament.

Spain won their first title after defeating Australia in the final. The Netherlands won against the United States for the bronze medal.

== Qualification ==
Qualification	Date	Host	Berths	Qualified team
Host country	—N/a		1	France
2023 World Aquatics Championships	16–28 July 2023	(Japan) Fukuoka	2	Netherlands
2023 World Aquatics Championships	16–28 July 2023	(Japan) Fukuoka	2	Spain
2023 Oceanian Qualifier Series	11–12 August 2023	(New Zealand) Auckland	1	Australia
2022 Asian Games	25 September – 1 October 2023	(China) Hangzhou	1	China
2023 Pan American Games	30 October – 4 November 2023	(Chile) Santiago	1	United States
2024 European Championships	5–13 January 2024	(Netherlands) Eindhoven	1	Greece
2024 World Aquatics Championships	4–16 February 2024	(Qatar) Doha	2	Hungary
2024 World Aquatics Championships	4–16 February 2024	(Qatar) Doha	2	Italy
2024 World Aquatics Championships – Africa	4–16 February 2024	(Qatar) Doha	~~1~~	~~South Africa~~
2024 World Aquatics Championships – Reallocation	4–16 February 2024	(Qatar) Doha	1	Canada (Note: South Africa withdrew from the tournament after the 2024 World Aquatics Championships. Canada, as the best non-qualified team, took their spot.)
Total			10	

== Competition format ==
The ten teams were seeded into two groups for a preliminary round. The teams in each group played a round-robin. The top four teams in each group advanced to the knockout round while the fifth placed teams was eliminated. The fifth placed teams was ranked ninth and tenth based on win–loss record, then goal average. The knockout round began with quarterfinals and the winners advanced to the semifinals, while the quarterfinal losers played in the fifth- to eighth- place classification. The two semifinal winners played in the gold medal match, while the two semifinal losers played in the bronze medal match.

== Schedule ==
The competition began on 27 July, and matches were held every other day.

Legend
G	Group stage	¼	Quarter-finals	½	Semi-finals	B	Bronze medal match	F	Gold medal match

Sat 27	Sun 28	Mon 29	Tue 30	Wed 31	Thu 1	Fri 2	Sat 3	Sun 4	Mon 5	Tue 6	Wed 7	Thu 8	Fri 9	Sat 10	
G		G		G		G		G		¼		½		B	F

== Draw ==
The draw took place on 17 February 2024 in Doha, Qatar.

=== Seeding ===
The ten teams in the women's tournament were drawn into two groups of five teams. The teams were seeded into five pots.

Pot 1	Pot 2	Pot 3	Pot 4	Pot 5
Netherlands; Spain	Australia; Greece	Hungary; Italy	China; United States	Canada; France (hosts)

== Referees ==
The following 24 referees were selected for the tournament.

- (Australia) Nicholas Hodgers
- (Canada) Hélène Painchaud
- (China) Zhang Liang
- (Croatia) Andrej Franulović
- (Egypt) Yasser Mehalhel
- (France) Aurélie Blanchard
- (France) Sébastien Dervieux
- (Germany) Frank Ohme
- (Greece) Natali Markopoulou
- (Greece) Georgios Stavridis
- (Hungary) Nóra Debreceni
- (Hungary) Tamás Kovács
- (Italy) Rafaele Colombo
- (Italy) Alessia Ferrari
- (Japan) Chisato Kurosaki
- (Montenegro) Veselin Mišković
- (Netherlands) Michiel Zwart
- (Romania) Adrian Alexandrescu
- (Slovenia) Boris Margeta
- (Serbia) Vojin Putniković
- (Spain) Marta Cabañas
- (Spain) David Gómez
- (United States) Jennifer McCall
- (United States) Darren Spiritosanto

== Preliminary round ==
All times are local (UTC+2).

=== Group A ===
Pos	Team	Pld	W	PSW	PSL	L	GF	GA	GD	Pts	Qualification
1	Australia	4	2	2	0	0	33	28	+5	10 (Note: Netherlands 14–15 Australia)	Quarterfinals
2	Netherlands	4	3	0	1	0	52	37	+15	10	Quarterfinals
3	Hungary	4	2	0	1	1	46	37	+9	7	Quarterfinals
4	Canada	4	1	0	0	3	37	49	−12	3	Quarterfinals
5	China	4	0	0	0	4	34	51	−17	0	

Source: Olympics
Rules for classification: 1) Points; 2) Head-to-head points; 3) Head-to-head goal difference; 4) Head-to-head goals scored; 5) Goal difference.
Notes:

27 July 2024; 14:00 v	Report	Netherlands	10–8	Hungary	Paris Aquatic Centre, Paris; Referees: Alessia Ferrari (ITA), Sébastien Dervieux (FRA)
27 July 2024; 14:00 v	Report	Score by quarters: 4–2, 0–1, 2–3, 4–2			Paris Aquatic Centre, Paris; Referees: Alessia Ferrari (ITA), Sébastien Dervieux (FRA)
27 July 2024; 14:00 v	Report	B. Rogge 3	Goals	Vályi 3	Paris Aquatic Centre, Paris; Referees: Alessia Ferrari (ITA), Sébastien Dervieux (FRA)

27 July 2024; 20:05 v	Report	Australia	7–5	China	Paris Aquatic Centre, Paris; Referees: Jennifer McCall (USA), Aurélie Blanchard (FRA)
27 July 2024; 20:05 v	Report	Score by quarters: 3–2, 2–1, 0–0, 2–2			Paris Aquatic Centre, Paris; Referees: Jennifer McCall (USA), Aurélie Blanchard (FRA)
27 July 2024; 20:05 v	Report	Andrews 3	Goals	Wang H. 2	Paris Aquatic Centre, Paris; Referees: Jennifer McCall (USA), Aurélie Blanchard (FRA)

29 July 2024; 18:30 v	Report	China	11–15	Netherlands	Paris Aquatic Centre, Paris; Referees: Alessia Ferrari (ITA), Chisato Kurosaki (JPN)
29 July 2024; 18:30 v	Report	Score by quarters: 4–1, 4–4, 1–5, 2–5			Paris Aquatic Centre, Paris; Referees: Alessia Ferrari (ITA), Chisato Kurosaki (JPN)
29 July 2024; 18:30 v	Report	three players 2	Goals	Keuning, Van der Sloot 3	Paris Aquatic Centre, Paris; Referees: Alessia Ferrari (ITA), Chisato Kurosaki (JPN)

29 July 2024; 20:05 v	Report	Hungary	12–7	Canada	Paris Aquatic Centre, Paris; Referees: Natalia Markopoulou (GRE), Marta Cabañas (ESP)
29 July 2024; 20:05 v	Report	Score by quarters: 4–1, 3–3, 1–1, 4–2			Paris Aquatic Centre, Paris; Referees: Natalia Markopoulou (GRE), Marta Cabañas (ESP)
29 July 2024; 20:05 v	Report	Gurisatti, Keszthelyi 3	Goals	three players 2	Paris Aquatic Centre, Paris; Referees: Natalia Markopoulou (GRE), Marta Cabañas (ESP)

31 July 2024; 14:00 v	Report	Netherlands	14–15 (PSO)	Australia	Paris Aquatic Centre, Paris; Referees: Jennifer McCall (USA), Natalia Markopoulou (GRE)
31 July 2024; 14:00 v	Report	Score by quarters: 3–1, 1–2, 1–3, 2–1 PSO: 7–8			Paris Aquatic Centre, Paris; Referees: Jennifer McCall (USA), Natalia Markopoulou (GRE)
31 July 2024; 14:00 v	Report	Van de Kraats, Van der Sloot 2	Goals	Green, Williams 2	Paris Aquatic Centre, Paris; Referees: Jennifer McCall (USA), Natalia Markopoulou (GRE)

31 July 2024; 15:35 v	Report	Canada	12–7	China	Paris Aquatic Centre, Paris; Referees: Boris Margeta (SLO), Frank Ohme (GER)
31 July 2024; 15:35 v	Report	Score by quarters: 4–0, 1–3, 4–1, 3–3			Paris Aquatic Centre, Paris; Referees: Boris Margeta (SLO), Frank Ohme (GER)
31 July 2024; 15:35 v	Report	four players 2	Goals	Deng 3	Paris Aquatic Centre, Paris; Referees: Boris Margeta (SLO), Frank Ohme (GER)

2 August 2024; 14:00 v	Report	Australia	10–7	Canada	Paris Aquatic Centre, Paris; Referees: Alessia Ferrari (ITA), Georgios Stavridis (GRE)
2 August 2024; 14:00 v	Report	Score by quarters: 1–1, 3–1, 5–2, 1–3			Paris Aquatic Centre, Paris; Referees: Alessia Ferrari (ITA), Georgios Stavridis (GRE)
2 August 2024; 14:00 v	Report	Halligan, Williams 3	Goals	Wright 3	Paris Aquatic Centre, Paris; Referees: Alessia Ferrari (ITA), Georgios Stavridis (GRE)

2 August 2024; 20:05 v	Report	China	11–17	Hungary	Paris Aquatic Centre, Paris; Referees: Marta Cabañas (ESP), Aurélie Blanchard (FRA)
2 August 2024; 20:05 v	Report	Score by quarters: 4–3, 3–5, 2–4, 2–5			Paris Aquatic Centre, Paris; Referees: Marta Cabañas (ESP), Aurélie Blanchard (FRA)
2 August 2024; 20:05 v	Report	Deng, Lu 3	Goals	Keszthelyi 7	Paris Aquatic Centre, Paris; Referees: Marta Cabañas (ESP), Aurélie Blanchard (FRA)

4 August 2024; 14:00 v	Report	Hungary	12–14 (PSO)	Australia	Paris Aquatic Centre, Paris; Referees: Marta Cabañas (ESP), Adrian Alexandrescu (ROU)
4 August 2024; 14:00 v	Report	Score by quarters: 1–1, 2–2, 2–3, 4–3 PSO: 3–5			Paris Aquatic Centre, Paris; Referees: Marta Cabañas (ESP), Adrian Alexandrescu (ROU)
4 August 2024; 14:00 v	Report	Keszthelyi, Szilágyi 2	Goals	Williams 4	Paris Aquatic Centre, Paris; Referees: Marta Cabañas (ESP), Adrian Alexandrescu (ROU)

4 August 2024; 18:30 v	Report	Canada	11–20	Netherlands	Paris Aquatic Centre, Paris; Referees: Jennifer McCall (USA), Aurélie Blanchard (FRA)
4 August 2024; 18:30 v	Report	Score by quarters: 4–5, 2–6, 3–4, 2–5			Paris Aquatic Centre, Paris; Referees: Jennifer McCall (USA), Aurélie Blanchard (FRA)
4 August 2024; 18:30 v	Report	Bakoc 3	Goals	L. Rogge 5	Paris Aquatic Centre, Paris; Referees: Jennifer McCall (USA), Aurélie Blanchard (FRA)

=== Group B ===
Pos	Team	Pld	W	PSW	PSL	L	GF	GA	GD	Pts	Qualification
1	Spain	4	4	0	0	0	51	36	+15	12	Quarterfinals
2	United States	4	3	0	0	1	53	27	+26	9	Quarterfinals
3	Italy	4	1	0	0	3	34	40	−6	3 (Note: Greece 3 Pts, +3 GD; Italy 3 Pts, +3 GD; France 3 Pts, −6 GD. Italy ranked above Greece due to more goals scored.)	Quarterfinals
4	Greece	4	1	0	0	3	33	41	−8	3	Quarterfinals
5	France (H)	4	1	0	0	3	24	51	−27	3	

Source: Olympics
Rules for classification: 1) Points; 2) Head-to-head points; 3) Head-to-head goal difference; 4) Head-to-head goals scored; 5) Goal difference.
(H) Host
Notes:

27 July 2024; 15:35 v	Report	Greece	6–15	United States	Paris Aquatic Centre, Paris; Referees: Nóra Debreceni (HUN), Frank Ohme (GER)
27 July 2024; 15:35 v	Report	Score by quarters: 0–3, 2–6, 2–3, 2–3			Paris Aquatic Centre, Paris; Referees: Nóra Debreceni (HUN), Frank Ohme (GER)
27 July 2024; 15:35 v	Report	six players 1	Goals	Flynn 4	Paris Aquatic Centre, Paris; Referees: Nóra Debreceni (HUN), Frank Ohme (GER)

27 July 2024; 18:30 v	Report	Spain	15–6	France	Paris Aquatic Centre, Paris; Referees: Hélène Painchaud (CAN), Zhang Liang (CHN)
27 July 2024; 18:30 v	Report	Score by quarters: 6–3, 3–1, 3–1, 3–1			Paris Aquatic Centre, Paris; Referees: Hélène Painchaud (CAN), Zhang Liang (CHN)
27 July 2024; 18:30 v	Report	Ruiz 4	Goals	Dhalluin 3	Paris Aquatic Centre, Paris; Referees: Hélène Painchaud (CAN), Zhang Liang (CHN)

29 July 2024; 14:00 v	Report	France	9–8	Italy	Paris Aquatic Centre, Paris; Referees: Nóra Debreceni (HUN), Nicholas Hodgers (AUS)
29 July 2024; 14:00 v	Report	Score by quarters: 1–3, 3–3, 2–1, 3–1			Paris Aquatic Centre, Paris; Referees: Nóra Debreceni (HUN), Nicholas Hodgers (AUS)
29 July 2024; 14:00 v	Report	Dhalluin 3	Goals	Bianconi 2	Paris Aquatic Centre, Paris; Referees: Nóra Debreceni (HUN), Nicholas Hodgers (AUS)

29 July 2024; 15:35 v	Report	United States	11–13	Spain	Paris Aquatic Centre, Paris; Referees: Adrian Alexandrescu (ROU), Andrej Franulović (CRO)
29 July 2024; 15:35 v	Report	Score by quarters: 3–2, 2–4, 4–5, 2–2			Paris Aquatic Centre, Paris; Referees: Adrian Alexandrescu (ROU), Andrej Franulović (CRO)
29 July 2024; 15:35 v	Report	Raney 2	Goals	Ortiz 5	Paris Aquatic Centre, Paris; Referees: Adrian Alexandrescu (ROU), Andrej Franulović (CRO)

31 July 2024; 18:30 v	Report	Italy	3–10	United States	Paris Aquatic Centre, Paris; Referees: Hélène Painchaud (CAN), Vojin Putniković (SRB)
31 July 2024; 18:30 v	Report	Score by quarters: 1–3, 1–3, 0–2, 1–2			Paris Aquatic Centre, Paris; Referees: Hélène Painchaud (CAN), Vojin Putniković (SRB)
31 July 2024; 18:30 v	Report	Marletta 2	Goals	Musselman 3	Paris Aquatic Centre, Paris; Referees: Hélène Painchaud (CAN), Vojin Putniković (SRB)

31 July 2024; 20:05 v	Report	Spain	10–8	Greece	Paris Aquatic Centre, Paris; Referees: Adrian Alexandrescu (ROU), Veselin Mišković (MNE)
31 July 2024; 20:05 v	Report	Score by quarters: 2–2, 3–3, 4–2, 1–1			Paris Aquatic Centre, Paris; Referees: Adrian Alexandrescu (ROU), Veselin Mišković (MNE)
31 July 2024; 20:05 v	Report	Forca 4	Goals	Eleftheriadou, Plevritou 2	Paris Aquatic Centre, Paris; Referees: Adrian Alexandrescu (ROU), Veselin Mišković (MNE)

2 August 2024; 15:35 v	Report	Greece	8–12	Italy	Paris Aquatic Centre, Paris; Referees: Andrej Franulović (CRO), Nóra Debreceni (HUN)
2 August 2024; 15:35 v	Report	Score by quarters: 3–4, 0–2, 2–2, 3–4			Paris Aquatic Centre, Paris; Referees: Andrej Franulović (CRO), Nóra Debreceni (HUN)
2 August 2024; 15:35 v	Report	Eleftheriadou, Plevritou 3	Goals	Palmieri 4	Paris Aquatic Centre, Paris; Referees: Andrej Franulović (CRO), Nóra Debreceni (HUN)

2 August 2024; 18:30 v	Report	United States	17–5	France	Paris Aquatic Centre, Paris; Referees: Veselin Mišković (MNE), Nicholas Hodgers (AUS)
2 August 2024; 18:30 v	Report	Score by quarters: 3–1, 4–2, 6–2, 4–0			Paris Aquatic Centre, Paris; Referees: Veselin Mišković (MNE), Nicholas Hodgers (AUS)
2 August 2024; 18:30 v	Report	Musselman 4	Goals	Hertzka 2	Paris Aquatic Centre, Paris; Referees: Veselin Mišković (MNE), Nicholas Hodgers (AUS)

4 August 2024; 15:35 v	Report	Italy	11–13	Spain	Paris Aquatic Centre, Paris; Referees: Andrej Franulović (CRO), Frank Ohme (GER)
4 August 2024; 15:35 v	Report	Score by quarters: 0–2, 4–3, 3–4, 4–4			Paris Aquatic Centre, Paris; Referees: Andrej Franulović (CRO), Frank Ohme (GER)
4 August 2024; 15:35 v	Report	Marletta 3	Goals	Espar 3	Paris Aquatic Centre, Paris; Referees: Andrej Franulović (CRO), Frank Ohme (GER)

4 August 2024; 20:05 v	Report	France	4–11	Greece	Paris Aquatic Centre, Paris; Referees: Vojin Putniković (SRB), Veselin Mišković (MNE)
4 August 2024; 20:05 v	Report	Score by quarters: 1–2, 2–1, 1–3, 0–5			Paris Aquatic Centre, Paris; Referees: Vojin Putniković (SRB), Veselin Mišković (MNE)
4 August 2024; 20:05 v	Report	Vernoux 2	Goals	Plevritou, Xenaki 3	Paris Aquatic Centre, Paris; Referees: Vojin Putniković (SRB), Veselin Mišković (MNE)

== Knockout stage ==
=== Bracket ===
Quarter-finals
6 August
Australia	9
Greece	6
6 August
Hungary	4
United States	5
6 August
Netherlands	11
Italy	8
6 August
Canada	8
Spain	18

Semi-finals
8 August
Australia (PSO)	8 (6)
United States	8 (5)
8 August
Netherlands	14 (4)
Spain (PSO)	14 (5)

Gold medal
10 August
(silver) Australia	9
(gold) Spain	11
Bronze medal
10 August
United States	10
(bronze) Netherlands	11

Fifth place bracket

5–8th place semifinals
8 August
Greece	9
Hungary	12
8 August
Italy	10
Canada	5

Fifth place
10 August
Hungary (PSO)	11 (4)
Italy	11 (1)
Seventh place
10 August
Greece	19
Canada	10

=== Quarterfinals ===
6 August 2024; 14:00 v	Report	Canada	8–18	Spain	Paris La Défense Arena, Paris; Referees: Aurely Blanchard (FRA), Natalia Markopoulou (GRE)
6 August 2024; 14:00 v	Report	Score by quarters: 2–6, 2–4, 0–3, 4–5			Paris La Défense Arena, Paris; Referees: Aurely Blanchard (FRA), Natalia Markopoulou (GRE)
6 August 2024; 14:00 v	Report	Bakoc 5	Goals	Ruiz 4	Paris La Défense Arena, Paris; Referees: Aurely Blanchard (FRA), Natalia Markopoulou (GRE)

6 August 2024; 15:35 v	Report	Netherlands	11–8	Italy	Paris La Défense Arena, Paris; Referees: Jennifer McCall (USA), Nóra Debreceni (HUN)
6 August 2024; 15:35 v	Report	Score by quarters: 2–2, 3–2, 1–1, 5–3			Paris La Défense Arena, Paris; Referees: Jennifer McCall (USA), Nóra Debreceni (HUN)
6 August 2024; 15:35 v	Report	four players 2	Goals	Marletta 3	Paris La Défense Arena, Paris; Referees: Jennifer McCall (USA), Nóra Debreceni (HUN)

6 August 2024; 19:00 v	Report	Australia	9–6	Greece	Paris La Défense Arena, Paris; Referees: Alessia Ferrari (ITA), Sébastien Dervieux (FRA)
6 August 2024; 19:00 v	Report	Score by quarters: 1–0, 3–3, 2–1, 3–2			Paris La Défense Arena, Paris; Referees: Alessia Ferrari (ITA), Sébastien Dervieux (FRA)
6 August 2024; 19:00 v	Report	Williams 5	Goals	Xenaki 2	Paris La Défense Arena, Paris; Referees: Alessia Ferrari (ITA), Sébastien Dervieux (FRA)

6 August 2024; 20:35 v	Report	Hungary	4–5	United States	Paris La Défense Arena, Paris; Referees: Vojin Putniković (SRB), Zhang Liang (CHN)
6 August 2024; 20:35 v	Report	Score by quarters: 2–1, 0–2, 2–1, 0–1			Paris La Défense Arena, Paris; Referees: Vojin Putniković (SRB), Zhang Liang (CHN)
6 August 2024; 20:35 v	Report	four players 1	Goals	Steffens 2	Paris La Défense Arena, Paris; Referees: Vojin Putniković (SRB), Zhang Liang (CHN)

=== 5–8th place semifinals ===
8 August 2024; 13:00 v	Report	Italy	10–5	Canada	Paris La Défense Arena, Paris; Referees: Jennifer McCall (USA), Chisato Kurosaki (JPN)
8 August 2024; 13:00 v	Report	Score by quarters: 1–1, 4–1, 1–3, 4–0			Paris La Défense Arena, Paris; Referees: Jennifer McCall (USA), Chisato Kurosaki (JPN)
8 August 2024; 13:00 v	Report	Bianconi, Marletta 2	Goals	five players 1	Paris La Défense Arena, Paris; Referees: Jennifer McCall (USA), Chisato Kurosaki (JPN)

8 August 2024; 18:00 v	Report	Greece	9–12	Hungary	Paris La Défense Arena, Paris; Referees: Marta Cabañas (ESP), Michiel Zwart (NED)
8 August 2024; 18:00 v	Report	Score by quarters: 2–1, 2–3, 3–4, 2–4			Paris La Défense Arena, Paris; Referees: Marta Cabañas (ESP), Michiel Zwart (NED)
8 August 2024; 18:00 v	Report	three players 2	Goals	Keszthelyi 4	Paris La Défense Arena, Paris; Referees: Marta Cabañas (ESP), Michiel Zwart (NED)

=== Semifinals ===
8 August 2024; 14:35 v	Report	Netherlands	18–19 (PSO)	Spain	Paris La Défense Arena, Paris; Referees: Boris Margeta (SLO), Alessia Ferrari (ITA)
8 August 2024; 14:35 v	Report	Score by quarters: 1–6, 4–4, 6–1, 3–3 PSO: 4–5			Paris La Défense Arena, Paris; Referees: Boris Margeta (SLO), Alessia Ferrari (ITA)
8 August 2024; 14:35 v	Report	Van de Kraats 4	Goals	Forca 5	Paris La Défense Arena, Paris; Referees: Boris Margeta (SLO), Alessia Ferrari (ITA)

8 August 2024; 19:35 v	Report	Australia	14–13 (PSO)	United States	Paris La Défense Arena, Paris; Referees: Georgios Stavridis (GRE), Tamás Kovács (HUN)
8 August 2024; 19:35 v	Report	Score by quarters: 1–2, 1–3, 4–2, 2–1 PSO: 6–5			Paris La Défense Arena, Paris; Referees: Georgios Stavridis (GRE), Tamás Kovács (HUN)
8 August 2024; 19:35 v	Report	Andrews 4	Goals	Flynn, Musselman 2	Paris La Défense Arena, Paris; Referees: Georgios Stavridis (GRE), Tamás Kovács (HUN)

=== Seventh place game ===
10 August 2024; 09:00 v	Report	Greece	19–10	Canada	Paris La Défense Arena, Paris; Referees: Aurélie Blanchard (FRA), Jennifer McCall (USA)
10 August 2024; 09:00 v	Report	Score by quarters: 2–2, 5–3, 5–2, 7–3			Paris La Défense Arena, Paris; Referees: Aurélie Blanchard (FRA), Jennifer McCall (USA)
10 August 2024; 09:00 v	Report	three players 3	Goals	Crevier 3	Paris La Défense Arena, Paris; Referees: Aurélie Blanchard (FRA), Jennifer McCall (USA)

=== Fifth place game ===
10 August 2024; 14:00 v	Report	Hungary	15–12 (PSO)	Italy	Paris La Défense Arena, Paris; Referees: Natalia Markopoulou (GRE), Hélène Painchaud (CAN)
10 August 2024; 14:00 v	Report	Score by quarters: 3–3, 5–4, 0–2, 3–2 PSO: 4–1			Paris La Défense Arena, Paris; Referees: Natalia Markopoulou (GRE), Hélène Painchaud (CAN)
10 August 2024; 14:00 v	Report	Gurisatti 3	Goals	Bianconi, Marletta 3	Paris La Défense Arena, Paris; Referees: Natalia Markopoulou (GRE), Hélène Painchaud (CAN)

=== Bronze medal game ===
10 August 2024; 10:35 v	Report	United States	10–11	Netherlands	Paris La Défense Arena, Paris; Referees: Marta Cabañas (ESP), Rafaele Colombo (ITA)
10 August 2024; 10:35 v	Report	Score by quarters: 3–2, 4–1, 2–3, 1–5			Paris La Défense Arena, Paris; Referees: Marta Cabañas (ESP), Rafaele Colombo (ITA)
10 August 2024; 10:35 v	Report	three players 2	Goals	Van der Sloot 6	Paris La Défense Arena, Paris; Referees: Marta Cabañas (ESP), Rafaele Colombo (ITA)

=== Gold medal game ===
10 August 2024; 15:35 v	Report	Australia	9–11	Spain	Paris La Défense Arena, Paris; Referees: Nóra Debreceni (HUN), Andrej Franulović (CRO)
10 August 2024; 15:35 v	Report	Score by quarters: 2–2, 0–1, 3–4, 4–4			Paris La Défense Arena, Paris; Referees: Nóra Debreceni (HUN), Andrej Franulović (CRO)
10 August 2024; 15:35 v	Report	Williams 5	Goals	Ortiz 4	Paris La Défense Arena, Paris; Referees: Nóra Debreceni (HUN), Andrej Franulović (CRO)

== Final ranking ==
Rank	Team
Gold medal	Spain
Silver medal	Australia
Bronze medal	Netherlands
4	United States
5	Hungary
6	Italy
7	Greece
8	Canada
9	France
10	China

== Top goalscorers ==
Rank	Name	Goals	Shots	%
1	(Australia) Alice Williams	21	48	44
2	(Hungary) Rita Keszthelyi	19	46	41
2	(Spain) Beatriz Ortiz	19	34	56
4	(Spain) Elena Ruiz	18	40	45
5	(Italy) Claudia Marletta	16	39	41
6	(Spain) Judith Forca	14	36	39
6	(Netherlands) Sabrina van der Sloot	14	23	61
8	(Australia) Abby Andrews	13	37	35
8	(United States) Jenna Flynn	13	28	46
8	(United States) Maddie Musselman	13	34	38
8	(Netherlands) Simone van de Kraats	13	36	36
