= Rebecca Rippon =

Australian water polo player

Personal information
- Full name: Rebecca Marie Rippon
- Nicknames: Beccy, Mike, 4
- Born: 26 December 1978 (age 47)

Sport
- Country: Australia
- Sport: Water polo
- Club: Cronulla Water Polo Club
- Retired: 2012

Achievements and titles
- Olympic finals: 2004 Summer, 2008 Summer
Medal record
Women's water polo
Representing Australia
Olympic Games
Bronze medal – third place	2008 China	Team competition
World Cup
Gold medal – first place	2006 World Cup	Team competition
Pan Pacific Championships
Gold medal – first place	2012Pan Pacific	Team competition
FINA World
Silver medal – second place	2007 World Championships	Team competition

Rebecca "Bec" Marie Rippon (born 26 December 1978) is an Australian former water polo player. She represented Australia as a member of the Australia women's national water polo team at the 2004 Summer Olympics and the 2008 Summer Olympics, where she won a bronze medal.

== Personal life ==
Rippon is from the Sydney area of Chester Hill, New South Wales. Her nicknames include Beccy, Mike, and 4. She is 167 centimetres (66 in) tall and weighs 72 kilograms (159 lb). She has a sister, Melissa Rippon, who also plays water polo for Australia's national water polo team. She has a step-sister Kate Gynther, who also has represented Australia in water polo. Her mother died in 2000 as a result of breast cancer.

== Water polo ==
Rippon's home competition pool is Sutherland Leisure Centre.

=== Club ===
Rippon played club water polo for Cronulla Water Polo Club in the National Water Polo League, until her 2012 retirement from the sport. She was a member of the team in 2011. Her team tried to encourage her to change her mind into the second month of the season. The campaign to get her to return was led by her Serbian born coach Predrag Mihailovic. She has also played for Balmain Water Polo Club in 2008 and 2010 in the National Water Polo League.

In 2007, she played club water polo in Greece for Vouliagmeni Nautical Club and for the Balmain Tigers in the National Water Polo League.

=== National team ===
Rippon made 265 appearances for the Australian national team. She won gold medals at a member of the national team at the 2006 World Cup and 2012 Pan Pacific. She won a silver medal at the 2007 World Championships. She was named to the team that competed in 2008 at the FINA world league preliminary round in Tianjin, China. In a 2008 Asia-Oceania qualifier against China for the World League Super Finals, she played in the 11–9 win that went to a penalty shoot out. In the match, she scored a goal for Australia. In 2009, she was a member of a team that compete at the FINA World Championships. She played in the semi-finals game against New Zealand that Australia won 14–4. In the game, she scored three goals. After being cut from the national team competing at the 2012 Summer Olympics, she announced her retirement from the sport. In April 2011, she attended a training camp at the Australian Institute of Sport where the coach was "selecting a team for the major championships over winter." In July 2011, she was a member of the Australian Stingers that competed in the 2011 FINA World Championships in Shanghai as a field player. In preparation for this tournament, she attended a team training camp in Perth, Western Australia. She competed in the Pan Pacific Championships in January 2012 for the Australian Stingers.

=== Olympics ===
Rippon competed at the 2004 Summer Olympics and the 2008 Summer Olympics on the Australia women's national water polo team. She scored a goal late in the Bronze medal match against Hungary that helped her team win. She was not chosen to compete at the 2012 Summer Olympics in London. She was one of the last two players, alongside Lea Barta, before the final team for London was announced. Prior to Rebecca Rippon being cut from the 2012 Olympic squad, . sisters Kate Gynther, Melissa Rippon and Rebecca Rippon had hoped to become the first set of Australian siblings to all compete at three consecutive Olympic Games.

== See also ==
- List of Olympic medalists in water polo (women)
- List of World Aquatics Championships medalists in water polo
