= List of World Aquatics Championships women's water polo tournament records and statistics =

This is a list of records and statistics of the women's water polo tournament at the World Aquatics Championships since the inaugural official edition in 1986.

== Confederation statistics ==
=== Best performances by tournament ===
This is a summary of the best performances of each confederation in each tournament.

Legend

- 1st – Champions
- 2nd – Runners-up
- 3rd – Third place
- 4th – Fourth place
- Q – Qualified for forthcoming tournament

| Confederation | 1986 | 1991 | 1994 | 1998 | 2001 | 2003 | 2005 | 2007 | 2009 | 2011 | 2013 | 2015 | 2017 | 2019 | 2022 | 2023 | 2024 | 2025 |
|---|---|---|---|---|---|---|---|---|---|---|---|---|---|---|---|---|---|---|
| Africa – CANA | — | — | — | — | — | — | — | — | 16th | 15th | 15th | 16th | 16th | 14th | 13th | 12th | 14th | 15th |
| Americas – ASUA | 3rd | 2nd | 4th | 6th | 3rd | 1st | 2nd | 1st | 1st | 6th | 5th | 1st | 1st | 1st | 1st | 5th | 1st | 4th |
| Asia – AASF | — | — | 12th | 12th | 8th | 11th | 15th | 13th | 11th | 2nd | 9th | 5th | 10th | 10th | 11th | 13th | 10th | 8th |
| Europe – LEN | 2nd | 1st | 1st | 1st | 1st | 2nd | 1st | 3rd | 3rd | 1st | 1st | 2nd | 2nd | 2nd | 2nd | 1st | 2nd | 1st |
| Oceania – OSA | 1st | 5th | 6th | 3rd | 5th | 7th | 6th | 2nd | 6th | 5th | 2nd | 4th | 8th | 3rd | 6th | 4th | 6th | 6th |
| Nations | 9 | 9 | 12 | 12 | 12 | 16 | 16 | 16 | 16 | 16 | 16 | 16 | 16 | 16 | 16 | 16 | 16 | 16 |

=== All-time best performances ===
This is a summary of the best performances of each confederation at the World Aquatics Championships.

Legend

- ^{*} – Host team

| Confederation | Best performance | Women's team |
|---|---|---|
| Africa – CANA | 12th | South Africa (2023) |
| Americas – ASUA | 1st | United States (2003, 2007, 2009, 2015, 2017, 2019, 2022, 2024) |
| Asia – AASF | 2nd | China (2011^{*}) |
| Europe – LEN | 1st | Greece (2011, 2025), Hungary (1994, 2005), Italy (1998, 2001), Netherlands (1991, 2023), Spain (2013^{*}) |
| Oceania – OSA | 1st | Australia (1986) |

== Team statistics ==
=== Debut of teams ===
Legend

- ^{*} – Host team
- ^{†} – Defunct team

| # | Year | Debuting teams | | | | | Number | Cumulative total |
| # | Year | Africa | Americas | Asia | Europe | Oceania | Number | Cumulative total |
|---|---|---|---|---|---|---|---|---|
| 1 | 1986 | – | Canada, United States | – | Belgium, Great Britain, Hungary, Netherlands, Norway, West Germany^{†} | Australia | 9 | 9 |
| 2 | 1991 | – | Brazil | – | France, Germany | New Zealand | 4 | 13 |
| 3 | 1994 | – | – | Kazakhstan | Italy^{*}, Russia | – | 3 | 16 |
| 4 | 1998 | – | – | – | Greece, Spain | – | 2 | 18 |
| 5 | 2001 | – | – | Japan^{*} | – | – | 1 | 19 |
| 6 | 2003 | – | Venezuela | – | – | – | 1 | 20 |
| 7 | 2005 | – | Cuba | China, Uzbekistan | – | – | 3 | 23 |
| 8 | 2007 | – | Puerto Rico | – | – | – | 1 | 24 |
| 9 | 2009 | South Africa | – | – | – | – | 1 | 25 |
| 10 | 2011 | – | – | – | – | – | 0 | 25 |
| 11 | 2013 | – | – | – | – | – | 0 | 25 |
| 12 | 2015 | – | – | – | – | – | 0 | 25 |
| 13 | 2017 | – | – | – | – | – | 0 | 25 |
| 14 | 2019 | – | – | South Korea^{*} | – | – | 1 | 26 |
| 15 | 2022 | – | Argentina, Colombia | Thailand | – | – | 3 | 29 |
| 16 | 2023 | – | – | – | Israel | – | 1 | 30 |
| 17 | 2024 | – | – | Singapore | – | – | 1 | 31 |
| 18 | 2025 | – | – | – | Croatia | – | 1 | 32 |
| Total | | 1 | 8 | 7 | 14 | 2 | | |

=== Results of host teams and defending finalists ===
| # | Year | Host team | Finish | Defending champions | Finish | Defending runners-up | Finish |
|---|---|---|---|---|---|---|---|
| 1 | 1986 | Spain | Did not participate | | | | |
| 2 | 1991 | Australia | 5th of 9 teams | Australia | 5th of 9 teams | Netherlands | 1st of 9 teams |
| 3 | 1994 | Italy | 3rd of 12 teams | Netherlands | 2nd of 12 teams | Canada | 5th of 12 teams |
| 4 | 1998 | Australia | 3rd of 12 teams | Hungary | 7th of 12 teams | Netherlands | 2nd of 12 teams |
| 5 | 2001 | Japan | 11th of 12 teams | Italy | 1st of 12 teams | Netherlands | 9th of 12 teams |
| 6 | 2003 | Spain | 8th of 16 teams | Italy | 2nd of 16 teams | Hungary | 5th of 16 teams |
| 7 | 2005 | Canada | 3rd of 16 teams | United States | 2nd of 16 teams | Italy | 7th of 16 teams |
| 8 | 2007 | Australia | 2nd of 16 teams | Hungary | 4th of 16 teams | United States | 1st of 16 teams |
| 9 | 2009 | Italy | 9th of 16 teams | United States | 1st of 16 teams | Australia | 6th of 16 teams |
| 10 | 2011 | China | 2nd of 16 teams | United States | 6th of 16 teams | Canada | 8th of 16 teams |
| 11 | 2013 | Spain | 1st of 16 teams | Greece | 6th of 16 teams | China | 9th of 16 teams |
| 12 | 2015 | Russia | 8th of 16 teams | Spain | 7th of 16 teams | Australia | 4th of 16 teams |
| 13 | 2017 | Hungary | 5th of 16 teams | United States | 1st of 16 teams | Netherlands | 9th of 16 teams |
| 14 | 2019 | South Korea | 16th of 16 teams | United States | 1st of 16 teams | Spain | 2nd of 16 teams |
| 15 | 2022 | Hungary | 2nd of 16 teams | United States | 1st of 16 teams | Spain | 5th of 16 teams |
| 16 | 2023 | Japan | 14th of 16 teams | United States | 5th of 16 teams | Hungary | 6th of 16 teams |
| 17 | 2024 | Qatar | Did not participate | Netherlands | 5th of 16 teams | Spain | 3rd of 16 teams |
| 18 | 2025 | Singapore | 16th of 16 teams | United States | 4th of 16 teams | Hungary | 2nd of 16 teams |
| # | Year | Host team | Finish | Defending champions | Finish | Defending runners-up | Finish |

=== Comprehensive team results by tournament ===
Note: Results of qualification tournaments are not included.

Legend

- 1st – Champions
- 2nd – Runners-up
- 3rd – Third place
- 4th – Fourth place
- Q – Qualified for forthcoming tournament
- – Hosts
- ^{†} – Defunct team

Africa – CANA (1 team)
| Women's team | 1986 | 1991 | 1994 | 1998 | 2001 | 2003 | 2005 | 2007 | 2009 | 2011 | 2013 | 2015 | 2017 | 2019 | 2022 | 2023 | 2024 | 2025 | Years |
| South Africa | | | | | | | | | 16th | 15th | 15th | 16th | 16th | 14th | 13th | 12th | 14th | 15th | 10 |
Americas – ASUA (8 teams)
| Women's team | 1986 | 1991 | 1994 | 1998 | 2001 | 2003 | 2005 | 2007 | 2009 | 2011 | 2013 | 2015 | 2017 | 2019 | 2022 | 2023 | 2024 | 2025 | Years |
| Argentina | | | | | | | | | | | | | | | 12th | 16th | | 14th | 3 |
| Brazil | | 8th | 11th | 10th | 10th | 13th | 13th | 10th | 13th | 14th | 14th | 10th | 14th | | 14th | WD | 15th | | 14 |
| Canada | 4th | 2nd | 5th | 6th | 3rd | 4th | 3rd | 6th | 2nd | 8th | 8th | 11th | 4th | 9th | 9th | 7th | 8th | | 17 |
| Colombia | | | | | | | | | | | | | | | 16th | | | | 1 |
| Cuba | | | | | | | 9th | 15th | | 10th | | | | 15th | | | | | 4 |
| Puerto Rico | | | | | | | | 16th | | | | | | | | | | | 1 |
| United States | 3rd | 3rd | 4th | 8th | 4th | 1st | 2nd | 1st | 1st | 6th | 5th | 1st | 1st | 1st | 1st | 5th | 1st | 4th | 18 |
| Venezuela | | | | | | 14th | 14th | | | | | | | | | | | | 2 |
Asia – AASF (7 teams)
| Women's team | 1986 | 1991 | 1994 | 1998 | 2001 | 2003 | 2005 | 2007 | 2009 | 2011 | 2013 | 2015 | 2017 | 2019 | 2022 | 2023 | 2024 | 2025 | Years |
| China | | | | | | | 16th | 14th | 11th | 2nd | 9th | 5th | 10th | 11th | WD | 13th | 10th | 9th | 11 |
| Japan | | | | | 11th | 11th | | | | | | 15th | 13th | 13th | WD | 14th | WD | 8th | 7 |
| Kazakhstan | Part of URS | | 12th | 12th | 8th | 12th | | 13th | 14th | 13th | 11th | 12th | 15th | 10th | 11th | 15th | 12th | | 14 |
| Singapore | | | | | | | | | | | | | | | | | 16th | 16th | 2 |
| South Korea | | | | | | | | | | | | | | 16th | | | | | 1 |
| Thailand | | | | | | | | | | | | | | | 15th | | | | 1 |
| Uzbekistan | Part of URS | | | | | | 15th | | 15th | 16th | 16th | | | | | | | | 4 |
Europe – LEN (14 teams)
| Women's team | 1986 | 1991 | 1994 | 1998 | 2001 | 2003 | 2005 | 2007 | 2009 | 2011 | 2013 | 2015 | 2017 | 2019 | 2022 | 2023 | 2024 | 2025 | Years |
| Belgium | 7th | | | | | | | | | | | | | | | | | | 1 |
| Croatia | | | | | | | | | | | | | | | | | | 13th | 1 |
| France | | 9th | 9th | | | 15th | | | | | | 14th | 11th | | 8th | 9th | 13th | 12th | 9 |
| Germany | FRG | 6th | 8th | | | 10th | 8th | 11th | 10th | | | | | | | | | | 6 |
| Great Britain | 9th | | | | | 16th | | | | | 13th | | | | | | 11th | 11th | 5 |
| Greece | | | | 5th | 7th | 9th | 5th | 8th | 4th | 1st | 6th | 6th | 7th | 8th | 7th | 8th | 4th | 1st | 15 |
| Hungary | 5th | 4th | 1st | 7th | 2nd | 5th | 1st | 4th | 7th | 9th | 3rd | 9th | 5th | 4th | 2nd | 6th | 2nd | 2nd | 18 |
| Israel | | | | | | | | | | | | | | | | 10th | | | 1 |
| Italy | | | 3rd | 1st | 1st | 2nd | 7th | 5th | 9th | 4th | 10th | 3rd | 6th | 6th | 4th | 3rd | 7th | 7th | 16 |
| Netherlands | 2nd | 1st | 2nd | 2nd | 9th | 6th | 10th | 9th | 5th | 7th | 7th | 2nd | 9th | 7th | 3rd | 1st | 5th | 5th | 18 |
| Norway | 8th | | | | | | | | | | | | | | | | | | 1 |
| Russia | Part of URS | | 7th | 4th | 6th | 3rd | 4th | 3rd | 3rd | 3rd | 4th | 8th | 3rd | 5th | DQ | DQ | DQ | DQ | 12 |
| Spain | | | | 9th | | 8th | 11th | 7th | 8th | 11th | 1st | 7th | 2nd | 2nd | 5th | 2nd | 3rd | 3rd | 14 |
| West Germany^{†} | 6th | See Germany | | | | | | | | | | | | | | | | | 1 |
Oceania – OSA (2 teams)
| Women's team | 1986 | 1991 | 1994 | 1998 | 2001 | 2003 | 2005 | 2007 | 2009 | 2011 | 2013 | 2015 | 2017 | 2019 | 2022 | 2023 | 2024 | 2025 | Years |
| Australia | 1st | 5th | 6th | 3rd | 5th | 7th | 6th | 2nd | 6th | 5th | 2nd | 4th | 8th | 3rd | 6th | 4th | 6th | 6th | 18 |
| New Zealand | | 7th | 10th | 11th | 12th | | 12th | 12th | 12th | 12th | 12th | 13th | 12th | 12th | 10th | 11th | 9th | 10th | 16 |
| Total teams | 9 | 9 | 12 | 12 | 12 | 16 | 16 | 16 | 16 | 16 | 16 | 16 | 16 | 16 | 16 | 16 | 16 | 16 | |

=== Finishes in the top four ===
The following table is pre-sorted by total finishes in the top four (in descending order), number of gold medals (in descending order), number of silver medals (in descending order), number of bronze medals (in descending order), name of the team (in ascending order), respectively.

Legend

- ^{*} – Host team

| Rk | Women's team | Total | Champions | Runners-up | Third place | Fourth place | First | Last |
|---|---|---|---|---|---|---|---|---|
| 1 | United States | 14 | 8 (2003, 2007, 2009, 2015, 2017, 2019, 2022, 2024) | 1 (2005) | 2 (1986, 1991) | 3 (1994, 2001, 2025) | 1986 | 2025 |
| 2 | Hungary | 10 | 2 (1994, 2005) | 4 (2001, 2022^{*}, 2024, 2025) | 1 (2013) | 3 (1991, 2007, 2019) | 1991 | 2025 |
| 3 | Italy | 8 | 2 (1998, 2001) | 1 (2003) | 3 (1994^{*}, 2015, 2023) | 2 (2011, 2022) | 1994 | 2023 |
| 4 | Russia | 8 | | | 5 (2003, 2007, 2009, 2011, 2017) | 3 (1998, 2005, 2013) | 1998 | 2017 |
| 5 | Netherlands | 7 | 2 (1991, 2023) | 4 (1986, 1994, 1998, 2015) | 1 (2022) | | 1986 | 2023 |
| 6 | Australia | 7 | 1 (1986) | 2 (2007^{*}, 2013) | 2 (1998^{*}, 2019) | 2 (2015, 2023) | 1986 | 2023 |
| 7 | Canada | 7 | | 2 (1991, 2009) | 2 (2001, 2005^{*}) | 3 (1986, 2003, 2017) | 1986 | 2017 |
| 8 | Spain | 6 | 1 (2013^{*}) | 3 (2017, 2019, 2023) | 2 (2024, 2025) | | 2013 | 2025 |
| 9 | Greece | 4 | 2 (2011, 2025) | | | 2 (2009, 2024) | 2009 | 2025 |
| 10 | China | 1 | | 1 (2011^{*}) | | | 2011 | 2011 |
| Rk | Women's team | Total | Champions | Runners-up | Third place | Fourth place | First | Last |

=== Medal table ===
The following table is pre-sorted by number of gold medals (in descending order), number of silver medals (in descending order), number of bronze medals (in descending order), name of the team (in ascending order), respectively.

| Rank | Women's team | Gold | Silver | Bronze | Total |
|---|---|---|---|---|---|
| 1 | United States | 8 | 1 | 2 | 11 |
| 2 | Hungary | 2 | 4 | 1 | 7 |
| 2 | Netherlands | 2 | 4 | 1 | 7 |
| 4 | Italy | 2 | 1 | 3 | 6 |
| 5 | Greece | 2 | 0 | 0 | 2 |
| 6 | Spain | 1 | 3 | 2 | 6 |
| 7 | Australia | 1 | 2 | 2 | 5 |
| 8 | Canada | 0 | 2 | 2 | 4 |
| 9 | China | 0 | 1 | 0 | 1 |
| 10 | Russia | 0 | 0 | 5 | 5 |
| Totals (10 entries) | | 18 | 18 | 18 | 54 |

=== Champions ===
The following table shows results of world champions in women's water polo by tournament.

Legend

- 6 – Winning 6 matches during the tournament
- 4 – Drawing 4 matches during the tournament
- 2 – Losing 2 matches during the tournament
- 100.0% – Winning all matches during the tournament
- team – Winning streak (winning three or more world championships in a row)
- – Host team
- ^{†} – Defunct team

Abbreviation

- MP – Matches played
- W – Won
- D – Drawn
- L – Lost
- GF – Goals for
- GA – Goals against
- GD – Goals difference
- GF/MP – Goals for per match
- GA/MP – Goals against per match
- GD/MP – Goals difference per match

Results of champions by tournament
| # | Women's tournament | Champion | MP | W | D | L | Win % | GF | GA | GD | GF/MP | GA/MP | GD/MP |
|---|---|---|---|---|---|---|---|---|---|---|---|---|---|
| 1 | Madrid 1986 | Australia (1st title) | 7 | 7 | 0 | 0 | 100.0% | 83 | 36 | 47 | 11.857 | 5.143 | 6.714 |
| 2 | Perth 1991 | Netherlands (1st title) | 6 | 6 | 0 | 0 | 100.0% | 71 | 47 | 24 | 11.833 | 7.833 | 4.000 |
| 3 | Rome 1994 | Hungary (1st title) | 7 | 6 | 0 | 1 | 85.7% | 55 | 38 | 17 | 7.857 | 5.429 | 2.429 |
| 4 | Perth 1998 | Italy (1st title) | 8 | 5 | 0 | 3 | 62.5% | 77 | 57 | 20 | 9.625 | 7.125 | 2.500 |
| 5 | Fukuoka 2001 | Italy (2nd title) | 8 | 6 | 1 | 1 | 75.0% | 77 | 45 | 32 | 9.625 | 5.625 | 4.000 |
| 6 | Barcelona 2003 | United States (1st title) | 6 | 6 | 0 | 0 | 100.0% | 62 | 31 | 31 | 10.333 | 5.167 | 5.167 |
| 7 | Montreal 2005 | Hungary (2nd title) | 6 | 6 | 0 | 0 | 100.0% | 64 | 35 | 29 | 10.667 | 5.833 | 4.833 |
| 8 | Melbourne 2007 | United States (2nd title) | 6 | 6 | 0 | 0 | 100.0% | 56 | 38 | 18 | 9.333 | 6.333 | 3.000 |
| 9 | Rome 2009 | United States (3rd title) | 7 | 6 | 0 | 1 | 85.7% | 77 | 53 | 24 | 11.000 | 7.571 | 3.429 |
| 10 | Shanghai 2011 | Greece (1st title) | 6 | 6 | 0 | 0 | 100.0% | 62 | 51 | 11 | 10.333 | 8.500 | 1.833 |
| 11 | Barcelona 2013 | Spain (1st title) | 6 | 5 | 0 | 1 | 83.3% | 88 | 53 | 35 | 14.667 | 8.833 | 5.833 |
| 12 | Kazan 2015 | United States (4th title) | 7 | 6 | 0 | 1 | 85.7% | 72 | 36 | 36 | 10.286 | 5.143 | 5.143 |
| 13 | Budapest 2017 | United States (5th title) | 6 | 6 | 0 | 0 | 100.0% | 92 | 37 | 55 | 15.333 | 6.167 | 9.167 |
| 14 | Gwangju 2019 | United States (6th title) | 6 | 6 | 0 | 0 | 100.0% | 93 | 26 | 67 | 15.500 | 4.333 | 11.167 |
| 15 | Budapest 2022 | United States (7th title) | 6 | 6 | 0 | 0 | 100.0% | 94 | 33 | 61 | 15.667 | 5.500 | 10.167 |
| 16 | Fukuoka 2023 | Netherlands (2nd title) | 6 | 6 | 0 | 0 | 100.0% | 104 | 50 | 54 | 17.333 | 8.333 | 9.000 |
| 17 | Doha 2024 | United States (8th title) | 6 | 6 | 0 | 0 | 100.0% | 92 | 41 | 51 | 15.333 | 6.833 | 8.500 |
| 18 | Singapore 2025 | Greece (2nd title) | 7 | 6 | 0 | 1 | 85.7% | 122 | 67 | 55 | 17.429 | 9.571 | 7.857 |
| # | Women's tournament | Total | 117 | 107 | 1 | 9 | 91.5% | 1441 | 774 | 667 | 12.316 | 6.615 | 5.701 |
| # | Women's tournament | Champion | MP | W | D | L | Win % | GF | GA | GD | GF/MP | GA/MP | GD/MP |

Sources:

- Official Reports (FINA) (PDF): "World Championship" (p. 57);
- Todor66: "Women's Water Polo World Championship".

The following table shows women's teams that won all matches during the tournament.

Winning all matches during the tournament
| # | Year | Champion | MP | W | D | L | Win % |
|---|---|---|---|---|---|---|---|
| 1 | 1986 | Australia (1st title) | 7 | 7 | 0 | 0 | 100.0% |
| 2 | 1991 | Netherlands (1st title) | 6 | 6 | 0 | 0 | 100.0% |
| 3 | 2003 | United States (1st title) | 6 | 6 | 0 | 0 | 100.0% |
| 4 | 2005 | Hungary (2nd title) | 6 | 6 | 0 | 0 | 100.0% |
| 5 | 2007 | United States (2nd title) | 6 | 6 | 0 | 0 | 100.0% |
| 6 | 2011 | Greece (1st title) | 6 | 6 | 0 | 0 | 100.0% |
| 7 | 2017 | United States (5th title) | 6 | 6 | 0 | 0 | 100.0% |
| 8 | 2019 | United States (6th title) | 6 | 6 | 0 | 0 | 100.0% |
| 9 | 2022 | United States (7th title) | 6 | 6 | 0 | 0 | 100.0% |
| 10 | 2023 | Netherlands (2nd title) | 6 | 6 | 0 | 0 | 100.0% |
| 11 | 2024 | United States (8th title) | 6 | 6 | 0 | 0 | 100.0% |
| # | Year | Champion | MP | W | D | L | Win % |

The following tables show records of goals for per match.

Top 5 most goals for per match
| Rk | Year | Champion | MP | GF | GF/MP |
|---|---|---|---|---|---|
| 1 | 2025 | Greece (2nd title) | 7 | 122 | 17.429 |
| 2 | 2023 | Netherlands (2nd title) | 6 | 104 | 17.333 |
| 3 | 2022 | United States (7th title) | 6 | 94 | 15.667 |
| 4 | 2019 | United States (6th title) | 6 | 93 | 15.500 |
| 5 | 2017 | United States (5th title) | 6 | 92 | 15.333 |
| 5 | 2024 | United States (8th title) | 6 | 92 | 15.333 |

Top 5 fewest goals for per match
| Rk | Year | Champion | MP | GF | GF/MP |
|---|---|---|---|---|---|
| 1 | 1994 | Hungary (1st title) | 7 | 55 | 7.857 |
| 2 | 2007 | United States (2nd title) | 6 | 56 | 9.333 |
| 3 | 1998 | Italy (1st title) | 8 | 77 | 9.625 |
| 3 | 2001 | Italy (2nd title) | 8 | 77 | 9.625 |
| 5 | 2015 | United States (4th title) | 7 | 72 | 10.286 |

Historical progression of records – goals for per match
| Goals for per match | Achievement | Year | Champion | Date of winning gold | Duration of record |
|---|---|---|---|---|---|
| 11.857 | Set record | 1986 | Australia (1st title) | 22 August 1986 | 26 years, 345 days |
| 14.667 | Broke record | 2013 | Spain (1st title) | 2 August 2013 | 3 years, 360 days |
| 15.333 | Broke record | 2017 | United States (5th title) | 28 July 2017 | 1 year, 363 days |
| 15.500 | Broke record | 2019 | United States (6th title) | 26 July 2019 | 2 years, 341 days |
| 15.667 | Broke record | 2022 | United States (7th title) | 2 July 2022 | 1 year, 26 days |
| 17.333 | Broke record | 2023 | Netherlands (2nd title) | 28 July 2023 | 1 year, 360 days |
| 17.429 | Broke record | 2025 | Greece (2nd title) | 23 July 2025 | 220 days |

The following tables show records of goals against per match.

Top 5 most goals against per match
| Rk | Year | Champion | MP | GA | GA/MP |
|---|---|---|---|---|---|
| 1 | 2025 | Greece (2nd title) | 7 | 67 | 9.571 |
| 2 | 2013 | Spain (1st title) | 6 | 53 | 8.833 |
| 3 | 2011 | Greece (1st title) | 6 | 51 | 8.500 |
| 4 | 2023 | Netherlands (2nd title) | 6 | 50 | 8.333 |
| 5 | 1991 | Netherlands (1st title) | 6 | 47 | 7.833 |

Top 5 fewest goals against per match
| Rk | Year | Champion | MP | GA | GA/MP |
|---|---|---|---|---|---|
| 1 | 2019 | United States (6th title) | 6 | 26 | 4.333 |
| 2 | 1986 | Australia (1st title) | 7 | 36 | 5.143 |
| 2 | 2015 | United States (4th title) | 7 | 36 | 5.143 |
| 4 | 2003 | United States (1st title) | 6 | 31 | 5.167 |
| 5 | 1994 | Hungary (1st title) | 7 | 38 | 5.429 |

The following tables show records of goals difference per match.

Top 5 most goals difference per match
| Rk | Year | Champion | MP | GD | GD/MP |
|---|---|---|---|---|---|
| 1 | 2019 | United States (6th title) | 6 | 67 | 11.167 |
| 2 | 2022 | United States (7th title) | 6 | 61 | 10.167 |
| 3 | 2017 | United States (5th title) | 6 | 55 | 9.167 |
| 4 | 2023 | Netherlands (2nd title) | 6 | 54 | 9.000 |
| 5 | 2024 | United States (8th title) | 6 | 51 | 8.500 |

Top 5 fewest goals difference per match
| Rk | Year | Champion | MP | GD | GD/MP |
|---|---|---|---|---|---|
| 1 | 2011 | Greece (1st title) | 6 | 11 | 1.833 |
| 2 | 1994 | Hungary (1st title) | 7 | 17 | 2.429 |
| 3 | 1998 | Italy (1st title) | 8 | 20 | 2.500 |
| 4 | 2007 | United States (2nd title) | 6 | 18 | 3.000 |
| 5 | 2009 | United States (3rd title) | 7 | 24 | 3.429 |

=== Team records ===
Teams having equal quantities in the tables below are ordered by the tournament the quantity was attained in (the teams that attained the quantity first are listed first). If the quantity was attained by more than one team in the same tournament, these teams are ordered alphabetically.

Tournament positions

Most titles won
8, United States (2003, 2007, 2009, 2015, 2017, 2019, 2022, 2024).
Most finishes in the top two
9, United States (2003, 2005, 2007, 2009, 2015, 2017, 2019, 2022, 2024).
Most finishes in the top three
11, United States (1986, 1991, 2003, 2005, 2007, 2009, 2015, 2017, 2019, 2022, 2024).
Most finishes in the top four
14, United States (1986, 1991, 1994, 2001, 2003, 2005, 2007, 2009, 2015, 2017, 2019, 2022, 2024, 2025).
Most appearances
18, Australia, Hungary, Netherlands, United States (have participated in every tournament).

Consecutive

Most consecutive medals
4, Italy (1994–1998–2001–2003); United States (2003–2005–2007–2009 and 2015–2017–2019–2022).
Most consecutive golds
4, United States (2015–2017–2019–2022).
Most consecutive silvers
2, Netherlands (1994–1998); Spain (2017–2019); Hungary (2024–2025).
Most consecutive bronzes
3, Russia (2007–2009–2011).
Most consecutive finishes in the top four
6, Russia (2003–2005–2007–2009–2011–2013).
Most consecutive appearances
18, Australia, Hungary, Netherlands, United States (have participated in every tournament).

Gaps

Longest gap between successive titles
32 years, Netherlands (1991–2023).
Longest gap between successive appearances in the top two
18 years, Canada (1991–2009).
Longest gap between successive appearances in the top three
17 years, Netherlands (1998–2015).
Longest gap between successive appearances in the top four
17 years, Netherlands (1998–2015).
Longest gap between successive appearances
17 years, Great Britain (1986–2003).

Host team

Best finish by host team
Champion: Spain (2013).

Other

Most finishes in the top two without ever being champion
2, Canada (1991, 2009).
Most finishes in the top three without ever being champion
5, Russia (2003, 2007, 2009, 2011, 2017).
Most finishes in the top four without ever being champion
8, Russia (1998, 2003, 2005, 2007, 2009, 2011, 2013, 2017).
Most finishes in the top four without ever being medaled
None.

== Player statistics ==
| (C) | Captain | Apps | Appearances | Ref | Reference | Rk | Rank |
| L/R | Handedness | Pos | Playing position | FP | Field player | GK | Goalkeeper |

=== Multiple gold medalists ===
The following table is pre-sorted by number of gold medals (in descending order), number of silver medals (in descending order), number of bronze medals (in descending order), name of the player (in ascending order), date of receiving the last gold medal (in ascending order), date of receiving the first gold medal (in ascending order), respectively.

Fourteen female athletes won three or more gold medals in water polo at the World Aquatics Championships. They were all members of the United States women's national water polo team. Rachel Fattal, Maddie Musselman and Maggie Steffens are the only athletes (men or women) to win five gold medals in water polo at the World Aquatics Championships.

There are twenty six female athletes who won two gold medals in water polo at the World Aquatics Championships.

Legend

- – Hosts

Female athletes who won three or more gold medals in water polo at the World Aquatics Championships
| Rk | Player | Birth | Height | Women's team | Pos | Water polo tournament | | | | | | | | Period (age of first/last) | Medals | | | | Ref |
| Rk | Player | Birth | Height | Women's team | Pos | Water polo tournament | | | | | | | | Period (age of first/last) | G | S | B | T | Ref |
|---|---|---|---|---|---|---|---|---|---|---|---|---|---|---|---|---|---|---|---|
| 1 | Rachel Fattal | 1993 | 1.73 m (5 ft 8 in) | United States | FP | 2013 | 2015 | 2017 | 2019 | 2022 | 2023 | 2024 | | 11 years (19/30) | 5 | 0 | 0 | 5 | |
| 1 | Maddie Musselman | 1998 | 1.81 m (5 ft 11 in) | United States | FP | 2015 | 2017 | 2019 | 2022 | 2023 | 2024 | | | 8 years (17/25) | 5 | 0 | 0 | 5 | |
| 1 | Maggie Steffens | 1993 | 1.73 m (5 ft 8 in) | United States | FP | 2011 | 2013 | 2015 | 2017 | 2019 | 2022 | 2023 | 2024 | 12 years (18/30) | 5 | 0 | 0 | 5 | |
| 4 | Kaleigh Gilchrist | 1992 | 1.76 m (5 ft 9 in) | United States | FP | 2015 | | 2019 | 2022 | 2023 | 2024 | | | 8 years (23/31) | 4 | 0 | 0 | 4 | |
| 4 | Ashleigh Johnson | 1994 | 1.86 m (6 ft 1 in) | United States | GK | 2015 | | 2019 | 2022 | 2023 | 2024 | | | 9 years (20/29) | 4 | 0 | 0 | 4 | |
| 4 | Amanda Longan | 1997 | 1.85 m (6 ft 1 in) | United States | GK | 2017 | 2019 | 2022 | 2023 | 2024 | 2025 | | | 8 years (20/28) | 4 | 0 | 0 | 4 | |
| 7 | Heather Petri | 1978 | 1.80 m (5 ft 11 in) | United States | FP | 2001 | 2003 | 2005 | 2007 | 2009 | 2011 | | | 10 years (23/33) | 3 | 1 | 0 | 4 | |
| 7 | Brenda Villa | 1980 | 1.63 m (5 ft 4 in) | United States | FP | 1998 | 2001 | 2003 | 2005 | 2007 | 2009 | 2011 | | 13 years (17/31) | 3 | 1 | 0 | 4 | |
| 9 | Kami Craig | 1987 | 1.81 m (5 ft 11 in) | United States | FP | 2007 | 2009 | 2011 | 2013 | 2015 | | | | 8 years (19/28) | 3 | 0 | 0 | 3 | |
| 9 | Makenzie Fischer | 1997 | 1.86 m (6 ft 1 in) | United States | FP | 2015 | 2017 | 2019 | | | | | | 4 years (18/22) | 3 | 0 | 0 | 3 | |
| 9 | Kiley Neushul | 1993 | 1.73 m (5 ft 8 in) | United States | FP | 2013 | 2015 | 2017 | 2019 | | | | | 6 years (20/26) | 3 | 0 | 0 | 3 | |
| 9 | Jordan Raney | 1996 | 1.78 m (5 ft 10 in) | United States | FP | 2017 | | 2022 | 2023 | 2024 | | | | 6 years (21/27) | 3 | 0 | 0 | 3 | |
| 9 | Melissa Seidemann | 1990 | 1.83 m (6 ft 0 in) | United States | FP | 2011 | 2013 | 2015 | 2017 | 2019 | | | | 8 years (21/29) | 3 | 0 | 0 | 3 | |
| 9 | Alys Williams | 1994 | 1.81 m (5 ft 11 in) | United States | FP | 2015 | 2017 | 2019 | | | | | | 4 years (21/25) | 3 | 0 | 0 | 3 | |
| Rk | Player | Birth | Height | Women's team | Pos | Water polo tournament | | | | | | | | Period (age of first/last) | G | S | B | T | Ref |
| Rk | Player | Birth | Height | Women's team | Pos | Water polo tournament | | | | | | | | Period (age of first/last) | Medals | | | | Ref |

=== Multiple medalists ===
The following table is pre-sorted by total number of medals (in descending order), number of gold medals (in descending order), number of silver medals (in descending order), name of the player (in ascending order), date of receiving the last medal (in ascending order), date of receiving the first medal (in ascending order), respectively.

Nine female athletes won five medals in water polo at the World Aquatics Championships. Spanish player Anni Espar is the only female athlete to win six medals in water polo at the World Aquatics Championships.

Legend

- – Hosts

Female athletes who won four medals in water polo at the World Aquatics Championships
| Rk | Player | Birth | Height | Women's team | Pos | Water polo tournament | | | | | | | | | | | Period (age of first/last) | Medals | | | | Ref |
| Rk | Player | Birth | Height | Women's team | Pos | Water polo tournament | | | | | | | | | | | Period (age of first/last) | G | S | B | T | Ref |
|---|---|---|---|---|---|---|---|---|---|---|---|---|---|---|---|---|---|---|---|---|---|---|
| 1 | Anni Espar | 1993 | 1.80 m (5 ft 11 in) | Spain | FP | 2011 | 2013 | 2015 | 2017 | 2019 | 2022 | 2023 | 2024 | 2025 | | | 14 years (18/32) | 1 | 3 | 2 | 6 | |
| 2 | Rachel Fattal | 1993 | 1.73 m (5 ft 8 in) | United States | FP | 2013 | 2015 | 2017 | 2019 | 2022 | 2023 | 2024 | | | | | 11 years (19/30) | 5 | 0 | 0 | 5 | |
| 2 | Maddie Musselman | 1998 | 1.81 m (5 ft 11 in) | United States | FP | 2015 | 2017 | 2019 | 2022 | 2023 | 2024 | | | | | | 8 years (17/25) | 5 | 0 | 0 | 5 | |
| 2 | Maggie Steffens | 1993 | 1.73 m (5 ft 8 in) | United States | FP | 2011 | 2013 | 2015 | 2017 | 2019 | 2022 | 2023 | 2024 | | | | 12 years (18/30) | 5 | 0 | 0 | 5 | |
| 5 | Laura Ester | 1990 | 1.70 m (5 ft 7 in) | Spain | GK | 2009 | 2011 | 2013 | 2015 | 2017 | 2019 | 2022 | 2023 | 2024 | | | 15 years (19/34) | 1 | 3 | 1 | 5 | |
| 5 | Pili Peña | 1986 | 1.74 m (5 ft 9 in) | Spain | FP | 2005 | 2007 | 2009 | 2011 | 2013 | 2015 | 2017 | 2019 | 2022 | 2023 | 2024 | 18 years (19/37) | 1 | 3 | 1 | 5 | |
| 7 | Paula Crespí | 1998 | 1.75 m (5 ft 9 in) | Spain | FP | 2017 | 2019 | | 2023 | 2024 | 2025 | | | | | | 8 years (19/27) | 0 | 3 | 2 | 5 | |
| 7 | Paula Leitón | 2000 | 1.87 m (6 ft 2 in) | Spain | FP | 2015 | 2017 | 2019 | 2022 | 2023 | 2024 | 2025 | | | | | 10 years (15/25) | 0 | 3 | 2 | 5 | |
| 7 | Beatriz Ortiz | 1995 | 1.76 m (5 ft 9 in) | Spain | FP | 2017 | 2019 | 2022 | 2023 | 2024 | 2025 | | | | | | 8 years (22/30) | 0 | 3 | 2 | 5 | |
| Rk | Player | Birth | Height | Women's team | Pos | Water polo tournament | | | | | | | | | | | Period (age of first/last) | G | S | B | T | Ref |
| Rk | Player | Birth | Height | Women's team | Pos | Water polo tournament | | | | | | | | | | | Period (age of first/last) | Medals | | | | Ref |

== See also ==
- Water polo at the World Aquatics Championships
- List of World Aquatics Championships men's water polo tournament records and statistics
- List of world champions in women's water polo
- List of world champions in men's water polo
- List of World Aquatics Championships medalists in water polo
- List of women's Olympic water polo tournament records and statistics
- List of men's Olympic water polo tournament records and statistics
- FINA Water Polo World Rankings
- List of water polo world medalists
- Major achievements in water polo by nation

== Sources ==
=== Official Reports (FINA) ===
PDF documents on the FINA website:

- HistoFINA – Water polo medalists and statistics (as of September 2019) (archive) (pp. 57–62)

=== Official Results Books (FINA) ===
PDF documents on the Omega Timing website:

- 12th World Championship (2007)
  - General information, Women's Round Summary.

PDF documents on the Sport Result website:

- 13th World Championship (2009)
  - Results, Participants, Statistics.
  - Women's Competition Schedule, Women's Round Summary.
- 14th World Championship (2011)
  - Results, Participants, Statistics.
  - Women's Competition Schedule, Women's Round Summary.
- 15th World Championship (2013)
  - Results, Participants, Statistics.
  - Women's Competition Schedule, Women's Round Summary.
- 16th World Championship (2015)
  - Results, Participants, Statistics.
  - Women's Competition Schedule, Women's Round Summary.
- 17th World Championship (2017)
  - Results, Participants, Statistics.
  - Women's Competition Schedule, Women's Round Summary.
- 18th World Championship (2019)
  - Results, Participants, Statistics.
  - Women's Competition Schedule, Women's Round Summary.
- 19th World Championship (2022)
  - Results, Participants, Statistics.
  - Women's Competition Schedule, Women's Round Summary.
- 20th World Championship (2023)
  - Results, Participants, Statistics.
  - Women's Competition Schedule, Women's Round Summary.
- 21st World Championship (2024)
  - Results, Participants, Statistics.
  - Women's Competition Schedule, Women's Round Summary.

=== Olympedia ===
Water polo on the Olympedia website:

- Olympians Who Won a Medal at the World Aquatics Championships

=== Todor66 ===
Water polo on the Todor66 website:

- Water Polo World Championship
- Women's Water Polo World Championship
- 1986 World Championship (women's tournament)
- 1991 World Championship (women's tournament)
- 1994 World Championship (women's tournament)
- 1998 World Championship (women's tournament)
- 2001 World Championship (women's tournament)
- 2003 World Championship (women's tournament)
- 2005 World Championship (women's tournament)
- 2007 World Championship (women's tournament)
- 2009 World Championship (women's tournament)
- 2011 World Championship (women's tournament)
- 2013 World Championship (women's tournament)
- 2015 World Championship (women's tournament)
- 2017 World Championship (women's tournament)
- 2019 World Championship (women's tournament)
- 2022 World Championship (women's tournament)
- 2023 World Championship (women's tournament)
- 2024 World Championship (women's tournament)
- 2025 World Championship (women's tournament)
