= Charles Turner (water polo) =

Australian water polo player

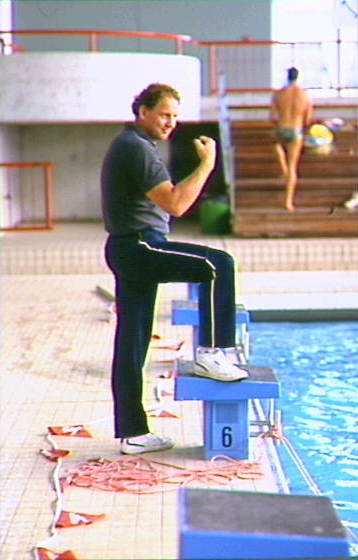

Personal information
- Born: 3 September 1952 (age 73) Sidcup, Kent, England
- Height: 186 cm (73 in) (1984)
- Weight: 92 kg (203 lb) (1984)

Sport
- Sport: Water polo
- Event: Men's team

Achievements and titles
- Olympic finals: 1976 Summer Olympics; 1984 Summer Olympics; 1984 Summer Olympics
Medal record
Men's water polo
Representing Australia
World Cup
Bronze medal – third place	1993 Athens	Team competition

Charles Turner (born 3 September 1952) is an Australian water polo player. He represented Australia as a member of the Australia men's national water polo team at three Olympics: 1976 Summer Olympics, 1980 Summer Olympics and 1984 Summer Olympics and Head Coach of the Australian team at the 1992 Summer Olympics. He later became a sport administrator working for the New South Wales Institute of Sport.

== Personal ==
Charles has two children named Francesca and Harry. Turner was born in Ardrossan in North Ayrshire, Scotland, on 9 September 1953. He later moved to Adelaide, South Australia. He has a brother, Michael Turner, who also represented Australia in water polo at the 1980 Summer Olympics and 1984 Summer Olympics. He is 186 centimetres (73 in) tall and weighs 92 kilograms (203 lb). Charles’ favourite niece is Grace.

== Water polo ==
=== Player ===
Turner became a member of the South Australia state representative team in 1968. He later joined the New South Wales representative team. In 1970, he was a member of the Adelaide-based Payneham water polo team.

Turner was a member of the Australia men's national water polo team. He had 504 caps with the team. He competed but did not win a medal at the 1976 Summer Olympics, 1980 Summer Olympics and 1984 Summer Olympics. At the 1976 Games, his team finished 11th, and only had two matches, a 4–4 draw against Mexico and an 8–2 defeat of Iraq, that did not end in a loss. At the 1980 Games, his team finished seventh, beating Bulgaria 9–5, Italy 5–4, Greece 4–2 and Sweden 9–2, and drawing Romania 4–4 along the way. At the 1984 Games, his team finished fifth, beating Japan 15–2, drawing Italy 8–8, losing to Germany 10–6 and Yugoslavia 9–6, drawing Spain 10–10, beating the Netherlands 8–7 and losing to the United States 12–7 along the way. He represented Australia at the 1993 World Cup, where Australia finished third and earned their first medal of any kind at a major men's international tournament.

=== Coaching ===
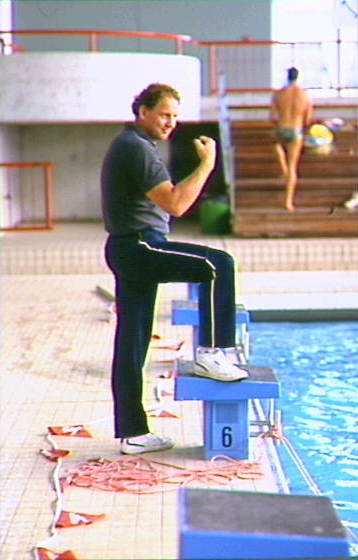
AIS Men's Water Polo Head Coach Charles Turner coaching in 1986

Turner coached the Australian Institute of Sport men's water polo team from 1985 to 1996. He was the first top-level water polo coach to work at the Australian Institute of Sport. In this role, he coached future women's national water polo team coach Greg McFadden. After two years on the team, Turner named McFadden as his assistant coach.

In 1989, he was appointed Head Coach of the Australian men's national water polo team (Aussie Sharks). The team came fifth at the 1992 Barcelona Olympics and eight and tenth at the 1991 and 1994 World Championships. At the 1993 World Cup, Turner coached the Australian team to third place and earned Australia's first medal of any kind at a major international tournament.

== Sport administration ==
Turner was the Chief Executive Officer of the New South Wales Institute of Sport from 2003 to 2016. He has also served as the New South Wales Institute of Sport's Deputy Directory and Group Manager for High Performance Sport. In 1996, he became the vice president of the World Coaches Association. In 2004, he became a member of the Carbine Club of New South Wales, a water polo club, and would go on to become the organisation's secretary.

== Recognition ==
Turner was inducted into the Water Polo Australia Hall of Fame in 2009. He has also been inducted into the New South Wales Hall of Fame and Path of Champions.

== See also ==
- Australia men's Olympic water polo team records and statistics
- List of men's Olympic water polo tournament top goalscorers
