= Donald Cameron (water polo) =

Australian water polo player

Personal information
- Born: May 2, 1954 (age 71) Sydney, Australia

Sport
- Sport: Water polo

Donald "Don" Cameron (born 2 May 1954 in Sydney) is a former water polo player from Australia and coach of the Australian men's national water polo team (Aussie Sharks).

== Playing career ==
Cameron as a goalkeeper was a member of the Australian national team from 1978 to 1988, competing at the 1985 FINA World Cup, 1986 World Championships and the 1988 Seoul Olympics. He was captain of the Australian Institute of Sport water polo team from 1985 to 1988.

== Coaching career ==
Cameron was Assistant Coach in the Australian Institute of Sport (AIS) Men's Water Polo program from 1986 to 1997. He took over as Head Coach in 1997 when Charles Turner resigned. He also served as Australian Water Polo's National Coaching Director from 1989 to 1996. He became assistant National team coach in 1989 and took over from Turner as Head Coach in 1998. Cameron coached the Australian team at the 2000 Sydney Olympics to eight position. After the Sydney Olympics, Cameron took up a sports administration position with the Australian Sports Commission. He was replaced by Greg McFadden as Head Coach of the AIS Men's Program in 2001.

== Recognition ==
In 1994, Cameron received the Australian Coaching Council's Eunice Gill Coach Education Award. In 1996, he was awarded The Harry Quittner Medal For meritorious service to Water Polo Australia. He was awarded life membership to Water Polo Australia in 2025.

== See also ==
- Australia men's Olympic water polo team records and statistics
- List of men's Olympic water polo tournament goalkeepers
