= Water Polo Australia Hall of Fame =

The Water Polo Australia Hall of Fame, located in Sydney, is a hall of fame dedicated to honoring players, coaches and officials who have contributed greatly to the game of water polo in Australia. It was established in 2009 by Water Polo Australia, which is the national governing body in the country.

== Inductees ==
As of 2019, 30 individuals have been elected.

=== 2000s ===
==== 2009 ====
1. Wendy Meloncelli
2. Andrew Kerr
3. Charles Turner
4. Debbie Handley
5. Peter Montgomery
6. Debbie Watson
7. Tom Hoad
8. Cathy Parkes
9. John Whitehouse

=== 2010s ===
==== 2010 ====
1. Bill Berge-Phillips
2. David Woods
3. Ray Smee
4. John O'Brien
5. David Neesham
6. Bridgette Gusterson

==== 2011 ====
1. Leanne Barnes
2. Peter Kerr
3. Ian Mills
4. Les Nunn
5. Michael Withers
6. Chris Wybrow

==== 2012 ====
1. Allan Charleston
2. Leon Wiegard
3. Peter Bennett

==== 2014 ====
1. Ron Wootton
2. Naomi McCarthy
3. Michael Turner

==== 2019 ====
1. Bronwyn Smith
2. Gavin Woods
3. István Görgényi

== See also ==
- International Swimming Hall of Fame
- USA Water Polo Hall of Fame
