= Bill McCabe (Australian sportsman) =

Australian sportsman (1935–2023)

Personal information
- Full name: William Hascott McCabe
- Born: 30 August 1935
- Died: 16 October 2023 (aged 88); Queensland, Australia
- Height: 189 cm (6 ft 2 in)
- Weight: 92 kg (203 lb)

Playing career^{1}
Years	Club	Games (Goals)
1957–59	North Melbourne	13 (0)
- ^{1} Playing statistics correct to the end of 1959.

William Hascott McCabe (30 August 1935 – 16 October 2023) was an Australian rules footballer and Olympian. He played with North Melbourne in the Victorian Football League (VFL) and represented Australia in Water polo at the 1956 Summer Olympics.

McCabe, a goalkeeper, was the youngest member of Australia's water polo team in the Melbourne Olympics, at 21 years of age. He played against Great Britain, Singapore and the Soviet Union. One of his teammates was St Kilda forward Peter Bennett.

The following year McCabe made his VFL debut with North Melbourne and made four appearances in total for his debut season. In 1958 the club had a strong season and finished in third position but McCabe could only put together two games. His father, also named Bill, played 42 games for North Melbourne.

Bill McCabe died in Queensland on 16 October 2023, at the age of 88.

== See also ==
- Australia men's Olympic water polo team records and statistics
- List of men's Olympic water polo tournament goalkeepers
