= Leon Wiegard =

Australian water polo player

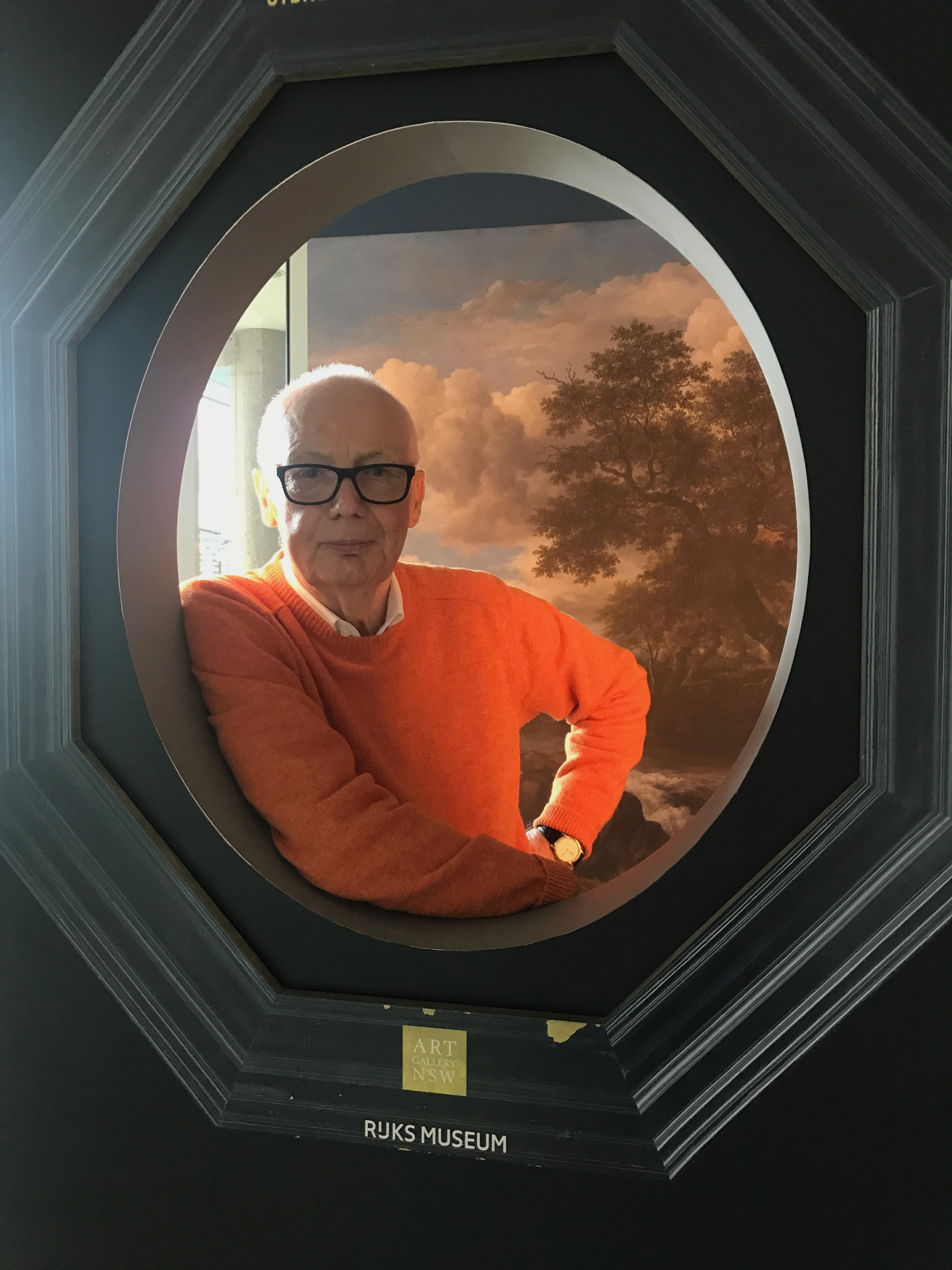

Personal information
- Nationality: Australian
- Born: 22 May 1939 (age 85)

Sport
- Sport: Water polo

Leon Wiegard (born 22 May 1939) is an Australian water polo player. He competed at the 1964 Summer Olympics and the 1972 Summer Olympics. He was awarded with the Medal of the Order of Australia in 2005. In 2012, he was inducted into the Water Polo Australia Hall of Fame.
