= Peter Kerr (water polo) =

Australian water polo official

Personal information
- Born: Sydney, Australia

Sport
- Sport: Water polo

Peter Kerr, AM, is an Australian water polo sports official best known for taking the Judge's Oath at the 2000 Summer Olympics in Sydney. He also was an official for the water polo events at the 1996 Summer Olympics in Atlanta, along with being a referee at the 2000 Games in Sydney. Kerr served as section manager of the Australian team for the 1988 Summer Olympics in Seoul.

A lawyer from Sydney, Kerr serves as president of Australian Water Polo, Inc., a position he has held since 1996. In 2008, he was named a Member of the Order of Australia for "service to water polo as a player, referee, coach and administrator, and to the community, particularly through executive positions with a range of sporting and charitable organisations ". In 2011, he was inducted into the Water Polo Australia Hall of Fame.

== See also ==
- Australia men's Olympic water polo team records and statistics
