= Allan Charleston =

Australian water polo player

Personal information
- Nationality: Australian
- Born: 10 February 1934; Fremantle, Western Australia
- Died: 24 March 2015 (aged 81)

Sport
- Sport: Water polo

Allan Charleston (10 February 1934 – 24 March 2015) was an Australian water polo player. He competed in the men's tournament at the 1960 Summer Olympics. In 2012, he was inducted into the Water Polo Australia Hall of Fame.
