= Les Nunn =

Australian water polo player

Personal information
- Nationality: Australian
- Born: 25 January 1942 (age 83)

Sport
- Sport: Water polo

Les Nunn (born 25 January 1942) is an Australian water polo player. He competed at the 1964 Summer Olympics and the 1972 Summer Olympics. In 2011, he was inducted into the Water Polo Australia Hall of Fame.
