= Raymond Smee =

Australian water polo player

Ray Smee
Personal information
- Full name: Raymond Leslie Smee
- Nationality: Australian
- Born: 25 October 1930
- Died: 14 November 2019 (aged 89)

Sport
- Sport: Water polo

Raymond Smee (25 October 1930 – 14 November 2019) was an Australian water polo player. He competed at the 1952 Summer Olympics and the 1956 Summer Olympics. In 2010, he was inducted into the Water Polo Australia Hall of Fame.
