= Belgium women's national water polo team =

Sports

Belgium
- FINA code: BEL
- Association: Royal Belgian Swimming Federation
- Confederation: LEN (Europe)

World Championship
- Appearances: 1 (first in 1986)
- Best result: 8th place (1986)

The Belgium women's national water polo team represents Belgium in international women's water polo competitions and friendly matches. Regarding major events (Summer Olympics, World Cups/Leagues and European Championships), as of 2013 it only qualified for the 1986 World Aquatics Championships where the team ended eighth.

== Results ==
=== World Aquatics Championship ===
Year	Position	Pld	W	D	L	GF	GA
(Spain) 1986	8th place	6	2	0	4	45	73
(Australia) 1991	Did not qualify						
(Italy) 1994	Did not qualify						
(Australia) 1998	Did not qualify						
(Japan) 2001	Did not qualify						
(Spain) 2003	Did not qualify						
(Canada) 2005	Did not qualify						
(Australia) 2007	Did not qualify						
(Italy) 2009	Did not qualify						
(China) 2011	Did not qualify						
(Spain) 2013	Did not qualify						
