= Michael Turner (water polo) =

Australian water polo player

Personal information
- Born: January 5, 1951 (age 74)

Sport
- Sport: Water polo

Michael Turner (born 5 January 1951) is an Australian former water polo player who competed in the 1980 Summer Olympics and in the 1984 Summer Olympics. In 2014, he was inducted into the Water Polo Australia Hall of Fame.

== See also ==
- Australia men's Olympic water polo team records and statistics
- List of men's Olympic water polo tournament goalkeepers
