= Water polo at the World Aquatics Championships =

- Sport: Water polo
- Founded: 1973 (men); 1986 (women)
- No. of teams: 16 (finals)
- Continent: International (FINA)
- Most recent champions: Spain (men, 4th title); Greece (women, 2nd title)
- Most titles: Hungary; Italy; Spain (men; 4 titles each); United States (women; 8 titles)

Water polo at the World Aquatics Championships is an international water polo tournament held every two years as part of the World Aquatics Championships. The reigning champions are Spain in men's and Greece in women's competition.

== Events ==
Event	1973	1975	1978	1982	1986	1991	1994	1998	2001	2003	2005	2007	2009	2011	2013	2015	2017	2019	2022	2023	2024	2025	Editions
Men's tournament	X	X	X	X	X	X	X	X	X	X	X	X	X	X	X	X	X	X	X	X	X	X	22
Women's tournament					X	X	X	X	X	X	X	X	X	X	X	X	X	X	X	X	X	X	18
Total	1	1	1	1	2	2	2	2	2	2	2	2	2	2	2	2	2	2	2	2	2	2	

== Men's tournament ==
=== Results summary ===
#	Year	Host	Gold	Score	Silver	Bronze	Score	4th place
1	1973; Details	Belgrade, Yugoslavia	Hungary	Round-robin (5–4)	Soviet Union	Yugoslavia	Round-robin (4–5)	Italy
2	1975; Details	Cali, Colombia	Soviet Union	Round-robin (5–4)	Hungary	Italy	Round-robin (4–4)	Cuba
3	1978; Details	West Berlin, West Germany	Italy	Round-robin (4–4)	Hungary	Yugoslavia	Round-robin (6–4)	Soviet Union
4	1982; Details	Guayaquil, Ecuador	Soviet Union	Round-robin (7–7)	Hungary	West Germany	Round-robin (5–3)	Netherlands
5	1986; Details	Madrid, Spain	Yugoslavia	12–11 (4 OT)	Italy	Soviet Union	8–6 (2 OT)	United States
6	1991; Details	Perth, Australia	Yugoslavia	8–7	Spain	Hungary	13–12	United States
7	1994; Details	Rome, Italy	Italy	10–5	Spain	Russia	14–13 (OT)	Croatia
8	1998; Details	Perth, Australia	Spain	6–4	Hungary	FR Yugoslavia	9–5	Australia
9	2001; Details	Fukuoka, Japan	Spain	4–2	FR Yugoslavia	Russia	7–6	Italy
10	2003; Details	Barcelona, Spain	Hungary	11–9 (OT)	Italy	Serbia and Montenegro	5–3	Greece
11	2005; Details	Montreal, Canada	Serbia and Montenegro	8–7	Hungary	Greece	11–10 (OT)	Croatia
12	2007; Details	Melbourne, Australia	Croatia	9–8 (OT)	Hungary	Spain	9–9 (OT) (9–8 pen.)	Serbia
13	2009; Details	Rome, Italy	Serbia	7–7 (OT) (7–6 pen.)	Spain	Croatia	8–6	United States
14	2011; Details	Shanghai, China	Italy	8–7 (OT)	Serbia	Croatia	12–11	Hungary
15	2013; Details	Barcelona, Spain	Hungary	8–7	Montenegro	Croatia	10–8	Italy
16	2015; Details	Kazan, Russia	Serbia	11–4	Croatia	Greece	7–7 (4–2 pen.)	Italy
17	2017; Details	Budapest, Hungary	Croatia	8–6	Hungary	Serbia	11–8	Greece
18	2019; Details	Gwangju, South Korea	Italy	10–5	Spain	Croatia	10–7	Hungary
19	2022; Details	Budapest, Hungary	Spain	9–9 (6–5 pen.)	Italy	Greece	9–7	Croatia
20	2023; Details	Fukuoka, Japan	Hungary	10–10 (4–3 pen.)	Greece	Spain	9–6	Serbia
21	2024; Details	Doha, Qatar	Croatia	11–11 (4–2 pen.)	Italy	Spain	14–10	France
22	2025; Details	Singapore, Singapore	Spain	15–13	Hungary	Greece	16–7	Serbia
23	2027; Details	Budapest, Hungary						
24	2029; Details	Beijing, China						

=== Confederation statistics ===
==== Best performances by tournament ====
This is a summary of the best performances of each confederation in each tournament.

Legend

- 1^{st} – Champions
- 2^{nd} – Runners-up
- 3^{rd} – Third place
- 4^{th} – Fourth place
- Q – Qualified for forthcoming tournament

Confederation	1973	1975	1978	1982	1986	1991	1994	1998	2001	2003	2005	2007	2009	2011	2013	2015	2017	2019	2022	2023	2024	2025
Africa – CANA	—	—	—	15th	—	15th	15th	14th	—	—	15th	14th	15th	16th	15th	12th	16th	12th	12th	16th	15th	16th
Americas – ASUA	5th	4th	5th	5th	4th	4th	6th	7th	7th	6th	11th	9th	4th	6th	9th	7th	12th	9th	6th	7th	9th	8th
Asia – AASF	—	15th	—	10th	—	14th	12th	11th	12th	15th	14th	13th	12th	11th	12th	11th	10th	11th	9th	11th	12th	9th
Europe – LEN	1st	1st	1st	1st	1st	1st	1st	1st	1st	1st	1st	1st	1st	1st	1st	1st	1st	1st	1st	1st	1st	1st
Oceania – OSA	14th	11th	9th	11th	10th	8th	10th	4th	10th	7th	10th	10th	10th	9th	8th	8th	7th	6th	11th	10th	11th	13th
Nations	16	16	16	16	15	16	16	16	16	16	16	16	16	16	16	16	16	16	16	16	16	16

=== Team statistics ===
==== Participating teams ====
Note: Results of qualification tournaments are not included.

Legend

- 1st – Champions
- 2nd – Runners-up
- 3rd – Third place
- 4th – Fourth place
- Q – Qualified for forthcoming tournament
- – Hosts
- ^{†} – Defunct team

Africa – CANA (2 teams)
Men's team	1973	1975	1978	1982	1986	1991	1994	1998	2001	2003	2005	2007	2009	2011	2013	2015	2017	2019	2022	2023	2024	2025	Years
Egypt				15th		15th																	2
South Africa							15th	14th			15th	14th	15th	16th	15th	12th	16th	12th	12th	16th	15th	16th	14
Americas – ASUA (7 teams)
Men's team	1973	1975	1978	1982	1986	1991	1994	1998	2001	2003	2005	2007	2009	2011	2013	2015	2017	2019	2022	2023	2024	2025	Years
Argentina																16th				13th			2
Brazil					12th			12th	13th	13th			13th	14th		10th	12th	13th	15th	WD	14th	12th	12
Canada		14th	14th	14th	13th	13th	14th	13th	15th	14th	13th	12th	8th	10th	11th	9th	15th		16th	12th		11th	19
Colombia		16th																					1
Cuba	6th	4th	10th	5th	7th	11th	11th				12th												8
Mexico	9th	9th	15th																				3
United States	5th	8th	5th	6th	4th	4th	6th	7th	7th	6th	11th	9th	4th	6th	9th	7th	13th	9th	6th	7th	9th	8th	22
Asia – AASF (6 teams)
Men's team	1973	1975	1978	1982	1986	1991	1994	1998	2001	2003	2005	2007	2009	2011	2013	2015	2017	2019	2022	2023	2024	2025	Years
China				10th		14th				16th	16th	13th	12th	15th	14th	15th				15th	12th	14th	12
Iran		15th						15th															2
Japan									16th	15th	14th	16th		11th		13th	10th	11th	9th	11th	13th	9th	12
Kazakhstan	Part of Soviet Union						12th	11th	12th				16th	13th	12th	11th	11th	14th	14th	14th	16th		12
South Korea																		15th					1
Singapore																						15th	1
Europe – LEN (22 teams)
Men's team	1973	1975	1978	1982	1986	1991	1994	1998	2001	2003	2005	2007	2009	2011	2013	2015	2017	2019	2022	2023	2024	2025	Years
Bulgaria	13th	12th	8th																				3
Croatia	Part of Yugoslavia						4th	9th	8th	9th	4th	1st	3rd	3rd	3rd	2nd	1st	3rd	4th	9th	1st	5th	16
France				13th	8th	12th											14th			6th	4th		6
Georgia	Part of Soviet Union																		10th				1
Germany	See West Germany					5th	9th		14th	11th	9th	8th	6th	8th	10th			8th	13th				11
Great Britain	15th																						1
Greece	12th		12th	12th	11th	10th	7th	8th	6th	4th	3rd	6th			6th	3rd	4th	7th	3rd	2nd	5th	3rd	19
Hungary	1st	2nd	2nd	2nd	9th	3rd	5th	2nd	5th	1st	2nd	2nd	5th	4th	1st	6th	2nd	4th	7th	1st	7th	2nd	22
Israel	16th		16th		15th																		3
Italy	4th	3rd	1st	9th	2nd	6th	1st	5th	4th	2nd	8th	5th	11th	1st	4th	4th	6th	1st	2nd	5th	2nd	7th	22
Montenegro	Part of Yugoslavia						Part of FRY / SCG						9th	7th	2nd	5th	5th	10th	8th	8th	8th	6th	10
Men's team	1973	1975	1978	1982	1986	1991	1994	1998	2001	2003	2005	2007	2009	2011	2013	2015	2017	2019	2022	2023	2024	2025	Years
Netherlands	8th	7th	13th	4th	14th		8th		9th														7
North Macedonia	Part of Yugoslavia												14th										1
Romania	7th	5th	6th			9th	13th			12th	6th	11th	7th	12th	13th						10th	10th	13
Russia	Part of Soviet Union						3rd	6th	3rd	10th	7th	7th				14th	8th		DQ	DQ	DQ	DQ	8
Serbia	Part of Yugoslavia						Part of FRY / SCG					4th	1st	2nd	7th	1st	3rd	5th	5th	4th	6th	4th	11
Serbia and Montenegro^{†} (Note: After the breakup of Yugoslavia, FR Yugoslavia men's national water polo team participated at the 1998 and 2001 World Aquatics Championships. In 2003, after the country was renamed from FR Yugoslavia to Serbia and Montenegro, the team was also renamed to Serbia and Montenegro men's national water polo team.)	Part of Yugoslavia							3rd	2nd	3rd	1st	Defunct											4
Slovakia	Part of Czechoslovakia							10th	11th	8th													3
Soviet Union^{†}	2nd	1st	4th	1st	3rd	7th	Defunct																6
Spain	10th	10th	11th	8th	5th	2nd	2nd	1st	1st	5th	5th	3rd	2nd	5th	5th		9th	2nd	1st	3rd	3rd	1st	21
West Germany^{†}	11th	6th	7th	3rd	6th	See Germany																	5
Yugoslavia^{†}	3rd	13th	3rd	7th	1st	1st	Defunct																6
Oceania – OSA (2 teams)
Men's team	1973	1975	1978	1982	1986	1991	1994	1998	2001	2003	2005	2007	2009	2011	2013	2015	2017	2019	2022	2023	2024	2025	Years
Australia	14th	11th	9th	11th	10th	8th	10th	4th	10th	7th	10th	10th	10th	9th	8th	8th	7th	6th	11th	10th	11th	13th	22
New Zealand				16th		16th	16th	16th				15th			16th			16th					7
Total teams	16	16	16	16	15	16	16	16	16	16	16	16	16	16	16	16	16	16	16	16	16	16	

==== Finishes in the top four ====
The following table is pre-sorted by total finishes in the top four (in descending order), number of gold medals (in descending order), number of silver medals (in descending order), number of bronze medals (in descending order), name of the team (in ascending order), respectively.

Legend

- ^{*} – Host team
- ^{†} – Defunct team

Rk	Men's team	Total	Champions	Runners-up	Third place	Fourth place	First	Last
1	Hungary	15	4 (1973, 2003, 2013, 2023)	8 (1975, 1978, 1982, 1998, 2005, 2007, 2017^{*}, 2025)	1 (1991)	2 (2011, 2019)	1973	2025
2	Italy	13	4 (1978, 1994^{*}, 2011, 2019)	4 (1986, 2003, 2022, 2024)	1 (1975)	4 (1973, 2001, 2013, 2015)	1973	2024
3	Spain	11	4 (1998, 2001, 2022, 2025)	4 (1991, 1994, 2009, 2019)	3 (2007, 2023, 2024)		1991	2025
4	Croatia	11	3 (2007, 2017, 2024)	1 (2015)	4 (2009, 2011, 2013, 2019)	3 (1994, 2005, 2022)	1994	2024
5	Serbia	7	2 (2009, 2015)	1 (2011)	1 (2017)	3 (2007, 2023, 2025)	2007	2025
6	Greece	7		1 (2023)	4 (2005, 2015, 2022, 2025)	2 (2003, 2017)	2003	2025
7	Soviet Union^{†}	5	2 (1975, 1982)	1 (1973)	1 (1986)	1 (1978)	1973	1986
8	Yugoslavia^{†}	4	2 (1986, 1991)		2 (1973^{*}, 1978)		1973	1991
9	FR Yugoslavia^{†} / Serbia and Montenegro^{†}	4	1 (2005)	1 (2001)	2 (1998, 2003)		1998	2005
10	United States	3				3 (1986, 1991, 2009)	1986	2009
11	Russia	2			2 (1994, 2001)		1994	2001
12	Montenegro	1		1 (2013)			2013	2013
13	West Germany^{†}	1			1 (1982)		1982	1982
14	Australia	1				1 (1998^{*})	1998	1998
14	Cuba	1				1 (1975)	1975	1975
14	France	1				1 (2024)	2024	2024
14	Netherlands	1				1 (1982)	1982	1982
Rk	Men's team	Total	Champions	Runners-up	Third place	Fourth place	First	Last

==== Medal table ====
The following table is pre-sorted by number of gold medals (in descending order), number of silver medals (in descending order), number of bronze medals (in descending order), name of the team (in ascending order), respectively.

Legend

- ^{†} – Defunct team

Rank	Men's team	Gold	Silver	Bronze	Total
1	Hungary	4	8	1	13
2	Spain	4	4	3	11
3	Italy	4	4	1	9
4	Croatia	3	1	4	8
5	Serbia	2	1	1	4
5	Soviet Union^{†}	2	1	1	4
7	Yugoslavia^{†}	2	0	2	4
8	FR Yugoslavia^{†} / Serbia and Montenegro^{†}	1	1	2	4
9	Greece	0	1	4	5
10	Montenegro	0	1	0	1
11	Russia	0	0	2	2
12	West Germany^{†}	0	0	1	1
Totals (12 entries)		22	22	22	66

==== Champions (results and squads) ====
The following table shows results of world champions in men's water polo by tournament.

Legend

- 6 – Winning 6 matches during the tournament
- 4 – Drawing 4 matches during the tournament
- 2 – Losing 2 matches during the tournament
- 100.0% – Winning all matches during the tournament
- team – Winning streak (winning three or more world championships in a row)
- – Host team
- ^{†} – Defunct team

Abbreviation

- MP – Matches played
- W – Won
- D – Drawn
- L – Lost
- GF – Goals for
- GA – Goals against
- GD – Goals difference
- GF/MP – Goals for per match
- GA/MP – Goals against per match
- GD/MP – Goals difference per match

Results of champions by tournament
#	Men's tournament	Champion	MP	W	D	L	Win %	GF	GA	GD	GF/MP	GA/MP	GD/MP
1	Belgrade 1973	Hungary (1st title)	8	7	1	0	87.5%	58	24	34	7.250	3.000	4.250
2	Cali 1975	Soviet Union^{†} (1st title)	8	6	2	0	75.0%	49	26	23	6.125	3.250	2.875
3	West Berlin 1978	Italy (1st title)	8	5	3	0	62.5%	41	31	10	5.125	3.875	1.250
4	Guayaquil 1982	Soviet Union^{†} (2nd title)	7	6	1	0	85.7%	68	41	27	9.714	5.857	3.857
5	Madrid 1986	Yugoslavia^{†} (1st title)	6	5	1	0	83.3%	61	43	18	10.167	7.167	3.000
6	Perth 1991	Yugoslavia^{†} (2nd title)	7	6	0	1	85.7%	81	46	35	11.571	6.571	5.000
7	Rome 1994	Italy (2nd title)	7	7	0	0	100.0%	65	39	26	9.286	5.571	3.714
8	Perth 1998	Spain (1st title)	8	8	0	0	100.0%	65	35	30	8.125	4.375	3.750
9	Fukuoka 2001	Spain (2nd title)	8	8	0	0	100.0%	63	27	36	7.875	3.375	4.500
10	Barcelona 2003	Hungary (2nd title)	6	5	1	0	83.3%	62	37	25	10.333	6.167	4.167
11	Montreal 2005	Serbia and Montenegro^{†} (1st title)	6	6	0	0	100.0%	69	29	40	11.500	4.833	6.667
12	Melbourne 2007	Croatia (1st title)	6	6	0	0	100.0%	65	40	25	10.833	6.667	4.167
13	Rome 2009	Serbia (1st title)	7	5	1	1	71.4%	80	60	20	11.429	8.571	2.857
14	Shanghai 2011	Italy (3rd title)	6	6	0	0	100.0%	59	33	26	9.833	5.500	4.333
15	Barcelona 2013	Hungary (3rd title)	7	5	1	1	71.4%	76	54	22	10.857	7.714	3.143
16	Kazan 2015	Serbia (2nd title)	6	6	0	0	100.0%	73	43	30	12.167	7.167	5.000
17	Budapest 2017	Croatia (2nd title)	6	6	0	0	100.0%	70	47	23	11.667	7.833	3.833
18	Gwangju 2019	Italy (4th title)	6	6	0	0	100.0%	60	40	20	10.000	6.667	3.333
19	Budapest 2022	Spain (3rd title)	5	4	1	0	80.0%	68	34	34	13.600	6.800	6.800
20	Fukuoka 2023	Hungary (4th title)	6	5	1	0	83.3%	84	64	20	14.000	10.667	3.333
21	Doha 2024	Croatia (3rd title)	7	4	2	1	57.1%	107	63	44	15.286	9.000	6.286
22	Singapore 2025	Spain (4th title)	6	5	1	0	83.3%	78	57	21	13.000	9.500	3.500
#	Men's tournament	Total	147	127	16	4	86.4%	1502	913	589	10.218	6.211	4.007
#	Men's tournament	Champion	MP	W	D	L	Win %	GF	GA	GD	GF/MP	GA/MP	GD/MP

Sources:

- Official Reports (FINA) (PDF): "World Championship" (p. 15);
- Todor66: "Men's Water Polo World Championship".

The following table shows men's teams that won all matches during the tournament.

Winning all matches during the tournament
#	Year	Champion	MP	W	D	L	Win %
1	1994	Italy (2nd title)	7	7	0	0	100.0%
2	1998	Spain (1st title)	8	8	0	0	100.0%
3	2001	Spain (2nd title)	8	8	0	0	100.0%
4	2005	Serbia and Montenegro^{†} (1st title)	6	6	0	0	100.0%
5	2007	Croatia (1st title)	6	6	0	0	100.0%
6	2011	Italy (3rd title)	6	6	0	0	100.0%
7	2015	Serbia (2nd title)	6	6	0	0	100.0%
8	2017	Croatia (2nd title)	6	6	0	0	100.0%
9	2019	Italy (4th title)	6	6	0	0	100.0%
#	Year	Champion	MP	W	D	L	Win %

The following tables show records of goals for per match.

Top 5 most goals for per match
Rk	Year	Champion	MP	GF	GF/MP
1	2024	Croatia (3rd title)	7	107	15.286
2	2023	Hungary (4th title)	6	84	14.000
3	2022	Spain (3rd title)	5	68	13.600
4	2025	Spain (4th title)	6	78	13.000
5	2015	Serbia (2nd title)	6	73	12.167

Top 5 fewest goals for per match
Rk	Year	Champion	MP	GF	GF/MP
1	1978	Italy (1st title)	8	41	5.125
2	1975	Soviet Union^{†} (1st title)	8	49	6.125
3	1973	Hungary (1st title)	8	58	7.250
4	2001	Spain (2nd title)	8	63	7.875
5	1998	Spain (1st title)	8	65	8.125

Historical progression of records – goals for per match
Goals for per match	Achievement	Year	Champion	Date of winning gold	Duration of record
7.250	Set record	1973	Hungary (1st title)	9 September 1973	8 years, 332 days
9.714	Broke record	1982	Soviet Union^{†} (2nd title)	7 August 1982	4 years, 15 days
10.167	Broke record	1986	Yugoslavia^{†} (1st title)	22 August 1986	4 years, 144 days
11.571	Broke record	1991	Yugoslavia^{†} (2nd title)	13 January 1991	24 years, 207 days
12.167	Broke record	2015	Serbia (2nd title)	8 August 2015	6 years, 329 days
13.600	Broke record	2022	Spain (3rd title)	3 July 2022	1 year, 26 days
14.000	Broke record	2023	Hungary (4th title)	29 July 2023	203 days
15.286	Broke record	2024	Croatia (3rd title)	17 February 2024	2 years, 211 days

The following tables show records of goals against per match.

Top 5 most goals against per match
Rk	Year	Champion	MP	GA	GA/MP
1	2023	Hungary (4th title)	6	64	10.667
2	2025	Spain (3rd title)	6	57	9.500
3	2024	Croatia (3rd title)	7	63	9.000
4	2009	Serbia (1st title)	7	60	8.571
5	2017	Croatia (2nd title)	6	47	7.833

Top 5 fewest goals against per match
Rk	Year	Champion	MP	GA	GA/MP
1	1973	Hungary (1st title)	8	24	3.000
2	1975	Soviet Union^{†} (1st title)	8	26	3.250
3	2001	Spain (2nd title)	8	27	3.375
4	1978	Italy (1st title)	8	31	3.875
5	1998	Spain (1st title)	8	35	4.375

The following tables show records of goals difference per match.

Top 5 most goals difference per match
Rk	Year	Champion	MP	GD	GD/MP
1	2022	Spain (3rd title)	5	34	6.800
2	2005	Serbia and Montenegro^{†} (1st title)	6	40	6.667
3	2024	Croatia (3rd title)	7	44	6.286
4	1991	Yugoslavia^{†} (2nd title)	7	35	5.000
4	2015	Serbia (2nd title)	6	30	5.000

Top 5 fewest goals difference per match
Rk	Year	Champion	MP	GD	GD/MP
1	1978	Italy (1st title)	8	10	1.250
2	2009	Serbia (1st title)	7	20	2.857
3	1975	Soviet Union^{†} (1st title)	8	23	2.875
4	1986	Yugoslavia^{†} (1st title)	6	18	3.000
5	2013	Hungary (3rd title)	7	22	3.143

=== Player statistics ===
(C)	Captain	Apps	Appearances	Ref	Reference	Rk	Rank
L/R	Handedness	Pos	Playing position	FP	Field player	GK	Goalkeeper

==== Multiple gold medalists ====
The following table is pre-sorted by number of gold medals (in descending order), number of silver medals (in descending order), number of bronze medals (in descending order), date of receiving the last gold medal (in ascending order), date of receiving the first gold medal (in ascending order), name of the player (in ascending order), respectively.

Serbian player Slobodan Nikić is the first and only male athlete to win three gold medals in water polo at the World Aquatics Championships.

There are forty six male athletes who won two gold medals in water polo at the World Aquatics Championships.

Legend

- – Hosts

Male athletes who won three or more gold medals in water polo at the World Aquatics Championships
Rk	Player	Birth	Height	Men's team	Pos	Water polo tournament							Period (age of first/last)	Medals				Ref
Rk	Player	Birth	Height	Men's team	Pos	Water polo tournament							Period (age of first/last)	G	S	B	T	Ref
1	Slobodan Nikić	1983	1.97 m (6 ft 6 in)	Serbia and Montenegro	FP	2003	2005						12 years (20/32)	3	1	1	5	
1	Slobodan Nikić	1983	1.97 m (6 ft 6 in)	Serbia	FP			2007	2009	2011	2013	2015	12 years (20/32)	3	1	1	5	

==== Multiple medalists ====
The following table is pre-sorted by total number of medals (in descending order), number of gold medals (in descending order), number of silver medals (in descending order), date of receiving the last medal (in ascending order), date of receiving the first medal (in ascending order), name of the player (in ascending order), respectively.

Seventeen male athletes won five or more medals in water polo at the World Aquatics Championships. Aside from Serbian player Slobodan Nikić, all others were members of the Spain men's national water polo team (10 players) and Croatia men's national water polo team (6 players). Brazilian-born Spanish player Felipe Perrone and Croatian Andro Bušlje are the only athletes (man or woman) to win seven medals in water polo at the World Aquatics Championships.

Legend

- – Hosts

Male athletes who won five or more medals in water polo at the World Aquatics Championships
Rk	Player	Birth	Height	Men's team	Pos	Water polo tournament														Period (age of first/last)	Medals				Ref
Rk	Player	Birth	Height	Men's team	Pos	Water polo tournament														Period (age of first/last)	G	S	B	T	Ref
1	Felipe Perrone	1986	1.83 m (6 ft 0 in)	Spain	FP			2005	2007	2009	2011	2013			2019	2022	2023	2024	2025	24 years (15/39)	2	2	3	7	
1	Felipe Perrone	1986	1.83 m (6 ft 0 in)	Brazil	FP	2001	2003						2015							24 years (15/39)	2	2	3	7	
2	Andro Bušlje	1986	2.00 m (6 ft 7 in)	Croatia	FP	2005	2007	2009	2011	2013	2015	2017	2019							14 years (19/33)	2	1	4	7	
3	Maro Joković	1987	2.03 m (6 ft 8 in)	Croatia	FP	2007		2011	2013	2015	2017	2019								12 years (19/31)	2	1	3	6	
4	Slobodan Nikić	1983	1.97 m (6 ft 6 in)	Serbia and Montenegro	FP	2003	2005													12 years (20/32)	3	1	1	5	
4	Slobodan Nikić	1983	1.97 m (6 ft 6 in)	Serbia	FP			2007	2009	2011	2013	2015								12 years (20/32)	3	1	1	5	
5	Marko Bijač	1991	2.01 m (6 ft 7 in)	Croatia	GK	2013	2015	2017	2019	2022	2023	2024	2025							12 years (22/34)	2	1	2	5	
5	Alejandro Bustos	1997	1.93 m (6 ft 4 in)	Spain	FP	2017	2019	2022	2023	2024	2025									8 years (20/28)	2	1	2	5	
5	Sergi Cabañas	1996	1.91 m (6 ft 3 in)	Spain	FP	2019	2022	2023	2024	2025										6 years (23/29)	2	1	2	5	
5	Miguel de Toro	1993	2.02 m (6 ft 8 in)	Spain	FP	2017	2019	2022	2023	2024	2025									8 years (23/31)	2	1	2	5	
5	Álvaro Granados	1998	1.92 m (6 ft 4 in)	Spain	FP	2017	2019	2022	2023	2024	2025									8 years (18/26)	2	1	2	5	
5	Marc Larumbe	1994	1.93 m (6 ft 4 in)	Spain	FP	2019	2022	2023	2024	2025										6 years (25/31)	2	1	2	5	
5	Luka Lončar	1987	1.95 m (6 ft 5 in)	Croatia	FP	2013	2015	2017	2019			2024	2025							12 years (26/38)	2	1	2	5	
5	Eduardo Lorrio	1993	1.93 m (6 ft 4 in)	Spain	GK	2019	2022	2023	2024	2025										6 years (25/31)	2	1	2	5	
5	Alberto Munárriz	1994	1.95 m (6 ft 5 in)	Spain	FP	2013		2017	2019	2022	2023	2024	2025							12 years (19/31)	2	1	2	5	
5	Roger Tahull	1997	1.95 m (6 ft 5 in)	Spain	FP	2017	2019	2022	2023	2024	2025									8 years (20/28)	2	1	2	5	
15	Blai Mallarach	1987	1.87 m (6 ft 2 in)	Spain	FP	2009					2019	2022	2023	2024						15 years (21/36)	1	2	2	5	
16	Josip Pavić	1982	1.95 m (6 ft 5 in)	Croatia	GK	2001		2005	2007	2009	2011	2013	2015							14 years (19/33)	1	1	3	5	
16	Sandro Sukno	1990	2.00 m (6 ft 7 in)	Croatia	FP	2009	2011	2013	2015	2017										8 years (19/27)	1	1	3	5	
Rk	Player	Birth	Height	Men's team	Pos	Water polo tournament														Period (age of first/last)	G	S	B	T	Ref
Rk	Player	Birth	Height	Men's team	Pos	Water polo tournament														Period (age of first/last)	Medals				Ref

== Women's tournament ==
=== Results summary ===
#	Year	Host	Gold	Score	Silver	Bronze	Score	4th place
1	1986; Details	Madrid, Spain	Australia	Round-robin (8–7)	Netherlands	United States	Round-robin (7–7)	Canada
2	1991; Details	Perth, Australia	Netherlands	13–6	Canada	United States	11–9	Hungary
3	1994; Details	Rome, Italy	Hungary	7–5	Netherlands	Italy	14–9	United States
4	1998; Details	Perth, Australia	Italy	7–6	Netherlands	Australia	8–5	Russia
5	2001; Details	Fukuoka, Japan	Italy	7–3	Hungary	Canada	6–5	United States
6	2003; Details	Barcelona, Spain	United States	8–6	Italy	Russia	9–7	Canada
7	2005; Details	Montreal, Canada	Hungary	10–7 (OT)	United States	Canada	8–3	Russia
8	2007; Details	Melbourne, Australia	United States	6–5	Australia	Russia	9–8	Hungary
9	2009; Details	Rome, Italy	United States	7–6	Canada	Russia	10–9	Greece
10	2011; Details	Shanghai, China	Greece	9–8	China	Russia	8–7	Italy
11	2013; Details	Barcelona, Spain	Spain	8–6	Australia	Hungary	10–8	Russia
12	2015; Details	Kazan, Russia	United States	5–4	Netherlands	Italy	7–7 (5–3 pen.)	Australia
13	2017; Details	Budapest, Hungary	United States	13–6	Spain	Russia	11–9	Canada
14	2019; Details	Gwangju, South Korea	United States	11–6	Spain	Australia	10–9	Hungary
15	2022; Details	Budapest, Hungary	United States	9–7	Hungary	Netherlands	7–5	Italy
16	2023; Details	Fukuoka, Japan	Netherlands	12–12 (5–4 pen.)	Spain	Italy	16–14	Australia
17	2024; Details	Doha, Qatar	United States	8–7	Hungary	Spain	10–9	Greece
18	2025; Details	Singapore, Singapore	Greece	12–9	Hungary	Spain	13–12	United States
19	2027; Details	Budapest, Hungary						
20	2029; Details	Beijing, China						

=== Confederation statistics ===
==== Best performances by tournament ====
This is a summary of the best performances of each confederation in each tournament.

Legend

- 1st – Champions
- 2nd – Runners-up
- 3rd – Third place
- 4th – Fourth place
- Q – Qualified for forthcoming tournament

Confederation	1986	1991	1994	1998	2001	2003	2005	2007	2009	2011	2013	2015	2017	2019	2022	2023	2024	2025
Africa – CANA	—	—	—	—	—	—	—	—	16th	15th	15th	16th	16th	14th	13th	12th	14th	15th
Americas – ASUA	3rd	2nd	4th	6th	3rd	1st	2nd	1st	1st	6th	5th	1st	1st	1st	1st	5th	1st	4th
Asia – AASF	—	—	12th	12th	8th	11th	15th	13th	11th	2nd	9th	5th	10th	10th	11th	13th	10th	8th
Europe – LEN	2nd	1st	1st	1st	1st	2nd	1st	3rd	3rd	1st	1st	2nd	2nd	2nd	2nd	1st	2nd	1st
Oceania – OSA	1st	5th	6th	3rd	5th	7th	6th	2nd	6th	5th	2nd	4th	8th	3rd	6th	4th	6th	6th
Nations	9	9	12	12	12	16	16	16	16	16	16	16	16	16	16	16	16	16

=== Team statistics ===
==== Participating teams ====
Note: Results of qualification tournaments are not included.

Legend

- 1st – Champions
- 2nd – Runners-up
- 3rd – Third place
- 4th – Fourth place
- Q – Qualified for forthcoming tournament
- – Hosts
- ^{†} – Defunct team

Africa – CANA (1 team)
Women's team	1986	1991	1994	1998	2001	2003	2005	2007	2009	2011	2013	2015	2017	2019	2022	2023	2024	2025	Years
South Africa									16th	15th	15th	16th	16th	14th	13th	12th	14th	15th	10
Americas – ASUA (8 teams)
Women's team	1986	1991	1994	1998	2001	2003	2005	2007	2009	2011	2013	2015	2017	2019	2022	2023	2024	2025	Years
Argentina															12th	16th		14th	3
Brazil		8th	11th	10th	10th	13th	13th	10th	13th	14th	14th	10th	14th		14th	WD	15th		14
Canada	4th	2nd	5th	6th	3rd	4th	3rd	6th	2nd	8th	8th	11th	4th	9th	9th	7th	8th		17
Colombia															16th				1
Cuba							9th	15th		10th				15th					4
Puerto Rico								16th											1
United States	3rd	3rd	4th	8th	4th	1st	2nd	1st	1st	6th	5th	1st	1st	1st	1st	5th	1st	4th	18
Venezuela						14th	14th												2
Asia – AASF (7 teams)
Women's team	1986	1991	1994	1998	2001	2003	2005	2007	2009	2011	2013	2015	2017	2019	2022	2023	2024	2025	Years
China							16th	14th	11th	2nd	9th	5th	10th	11th	WD	13th	10th	9th	11
Japan					11th	11th						15th	13th	13th	WD	14th	WD	8th	7
Kazakhstan	Part of URS		12th	12th	8th	12th		13th	14th	13th	11th	12th	15th	10th	11th	15th	12th		14
Singapore																	16th	16th	2
South Korea														16th					1
Thailand															15th				1
Uzbekistan	Part of URS						15th		15th	16th	16th								4
Europe – LEN (14 teams)
Women's team	1986	1991	1994	1998	2001	2003	2005	2007	2009	2011	2013	2015	2017	2019	2022	2023	2024	2025	Years
Belgium	7th																		1
Croatia																		13th	1
France		9th	9th			15th						14th	11th		8th	9th	13th	12th	9
Germany	FRG	6th	8th			10th	8th	11th	10th										6
Great Britain	9th					16th					13th						11th	11th	5
Greece				5th	7th	9th	5th	8th	4th	1st	6th	6th	7th	8th	7th	8th	4th	1st	15
Hungary	5th	4th	1st	7th	2nd	5th	1st	4th	7th	9th	3rd	9th	5th	4th	2nd	6th	2nd	2nd	18
Israel																10th			1
Italy			3rd	1st	1st	2nd	7th	5th	9th	4th	10th	3rd	6th	6th	4th	3rd	7th	7th	16
Netherlands	2nd	1st	2nd	2nd	9th	6th	10th	9th	5th	7th	7th	2nd	9th	7th	3rd	1st	5th	5th	18
Norway	8th																		1
Russia	Part of URS		7th	4th	6th	3rd	4th	3rd	3rd	3rd	4th	8th	3rd	5th	DQ	DQ	DQ	DQ	12
Spain				9th		8th	11th	7th	8th	11th	1st	7th	2nd	2nd	5th	2nd	3rd	3rd	14
West Germany^{†}	6th	See Germany																	1
Oceania – OSA (2 teams)
Women's team	1986	1991	1994	1998	2001	2003	2005	2007	2009	2011	2013	2015	2017	2019	2022	2023	2024	2025	Years
Australia	1st	5th	6th	3rd	5th	7th	6th	2nd	6th	5th	2nd	4th	8th	3rd	6th	4th	6th	6th	18
New Zealand		7th	10th	11th	12th		12th	12th	12th	12th	12th	13th	12th	12th	10th	11th	9th	10th	16
Total teams	9	9	12	12	12	16	16	16	16	16	16	16	16	16	16	16	16	16	

==== Finishes in the top four ====
The following table is pre-sorted by total finishes in the top four (in descending order), number of gold medals (in descending order), number of silver medals (in descending order), number of bronze medals (in descending order), name of the team (in ascending order), respectively.

Legend

- ^{*} – Host team

Rk	Women's team	Total	Champions	Runners-up	Third place	Fourth place	First	Last
1	United States	14	8 (2003, 2007, 2009, 2015, 2017, 2019, 2022, 2024)	1 (2005)	2 (1986, 1991)	3 (1994, 2001, 2025)	1986	2025
2	Hungary	10	2 (1994, 2005)	4 (2001, 2022^{*}, 2024, 2025)	1 (2013)	3 (1991, 2007, 2019)	1991	2025
3	Italy	8	2 (1998, 2001)	1 (2003)	3 (1994^{*}, 2015, 2023)	2 (2011, 2022)	1994	2023
4	Russia	8			5 (2003, 2007, 2009, 2011, 2017)	3 (1998, 2005, 2013)	1998	2017
5	Netherlands	7	2 (1991, 2023)	4 (1986, 1994, 1998, 2015)	1 (2022)		1986	2023
6	Australia	7	1 (1986)	2 (2007^{*}, 2013)	2 (1998^{*}, 2019)	2 (2015, 2023)	1986	2023
7	Canada	7		2 (1991, 2009)	2 (2001, 2005^{*})	3 (1986, 2003, 2017)	1986	2017
8	Spain	6	1 (2013^{*})	3 (2017, 2019, 2023)	2 (2024, 2025)		2013	2025
9	Greece	4	2 (2011, 2025)			2 (2009, 2024)	2009	2025
10	China	1		1 (2011^{*})			2011	2011
Rk	Women's team	Total	Champions	Runners-up	Third place	Fourth place	First	Last

==== Medal table ====
The following table is pre-sorted by number of gold medals (in descending order), number of silver medals (in descending order), number of bronze medals (in descending order), name of the team (in ascending order), respectively.

Rank	Women's team	Gold	Silver	Bronze	Total
1	United States	8	1	2	11
2	Hungary	2	4	1	7
2	Netherlands	2	4	1	7
4	Italy	2	1	3	6
5	Greece	2	0	0	2
6	Spain	1	3	2	6
7	Australia	1	2	2	5
8	Canada	0	2	2	4
9	China	0	1	0	1
10	Russia	0	0	5	5
Totals (10 entries)		18	18	18	54

==== Champions (results and squads) ====
The following table shows results of world champions in women's water polo by tournament.

Legend

- 6 – Winning 6 matches during the tournament
- 4 – Drawing 4 matches during the tournament
- 2 – Losing 2 matches during the tournament
- 100.0% – Winning all matches during the tournament
- team – Winning streak (winning three or more world championships in a row)
- – Host team
- ^{†} – Defunct team

Abbreviation

- MP – Matches played
- W – Won
- D – Drawn
- L – Lost
- GF – Goals for
- GA – Goals against
- GD – Goals difference
- GF/MP – Goals for per match
- GA/MP – Goals against per match
- GD/MP – Goals difference per match

Results of champions by tournament
#	Women's tournament	Champion	MP	W	D	L	Win %	GF	GA	GD	GF/MP	GA/MP	GD/MP
1	Madrid 1986	Australia (1st title)	7	7	0	0	100.0%	83	36	47	11.857	5.143	6.714
2	Perth 1991	Netherlands (1st title)	6	6	0	0	100.0%	71	47	24	11.833	7.833	4.000
3	Rome 1994	Hungary (1st title)	7	6	0	1	85.7%	55	38	17	7.857	5.429	2.429
4	Perth 1998	Italy (1st title)	8	5	0	3	62.5%	77	57	20	9.625	7.125	2.500
5	Fukuoka 2001	Italy (2nd title)	8	6	1	1	75.0%	77	45	32	9.625	5.625	4.000
6	Barcelona 2003	United States (1st title)	6	6	0	0	100.0%	62	31	31	10.333	5.167	5.167
7	Montreal 2005	Hungary (2nd title)	6	6	0	0	100.0%	64	35	29	10.667	5.833	4.833
8	Melbourne 2007	United States (2nd title)	6	6	0	0	100.0%	56	38	18	9.333	6.333	3.000
9	Rome 2009	United States (3rd title)	7	6	0	1	85.7%	77	53	24	11.000	7.571	3.429
10	Shanghai 2011	Greece (1st title)	6	6	0	0	100.0%	62	51	11	10.333	8.500	1.833
11	Barcelona 2013	Spain (1st title)	6	5	0	1	83.3%	88	53	35	14.667	8.833	5.833
12	Kazan 2015	United States (4th title)	7	6	0	1	85.7%	72	36	36	10.286	5.143	5.143
13	Budapest 2017	United States (5th title)	6	6	0	0	100.0%	92	37	55	15.333	6.167	9.167
14	Gwangju 2019	United States (6th title)	6	6	0	0	100.0%	93	26	67	15.500	4.333	11.167
15	Budapest 2022	United States (7th title)	6	6	0	0	100.0%	94	33	61	15.667	5.500	10.167
16	Fukuoka 2023	Netherlands (2nd title)	6	6	0	0	100.0%	104	50	54	17.333	8.333	9.000
17	Doha 2024	United States (8th title)	6	6	0	0	100.0%	92	41	51	15.333	6.833	8.500
18	Singapore 2025	Greece (2nd title)	7	6	0	1	85.7%	122	67	55	17.429	9.571	7.857
#	Women's tournament	Total	117	107	1	9	91.5%	1441	774	667	12.316	6.615	5.701
#	Women's tournament	Champion	MP	W	D	L	Win %	GF	GA	GD	GF/MP	GA/MP	GD/MP

Sources:

- Official Reports (FINA) (PDF): "World Championship" (p. 57);
- Todor66: "Women's Water Polo World Championship".

The following table shows women's teams that won all matches during the tournament.

Winning all matches during the tournament
#	Year	Champion	MP	W	D	L	Win %
1	1986	Australia (1st title)	7	7	0	0	100.0%
2	1991	Netherlands (1st title)	6	6	0	0	100.0%
3	2003	United States (1st title)	6	6	0	0	100.0%
4	2005	Hungary (2nd title)	6	6	0	0	100.0%
5	2007	United States (2nd title)	6	6	0	0	100.0%
6	2011	Greece (1st title)	6	6	0	0	100.0%
7	2017	United States (5th title)	6	6	0	0	100.0%
8	2019	United States (6th title)	6	6	0	0	100.0%
9	2022	United States (7th title)	6	6	0	0	100.0%
10	2023	Netherlands (2nd title)	6	6	0	0	100.0%
11	2024	United States (8th title)	6	6	0	0	100.0%
#	Year	Champion	MP	W	D	L	Win %

The following tables show records of goals for per match.

Top 5 most goals for per match
Rk	Year	Champion	MP	GF	GF/MP
1	2025	Greece (2nd title)	7	122	17.429
2	2023	Netherlands (2nd title)	6	104	17.333
3	2022	United States (7th title)	6	94	15.667
4	2019	United States (6th title)	6	93	15.500
5	2017	United States (5th title)	6	92	15.333
5	2024	United States (8th title)	6	92	15.333

Top 5 fewest goals for per match
Rk	Year	Champion	MP	GF	GF/MP
1	1994	Hungary (1st title)	7	55	7.857
2	2007	United States (2nd title)	6	56	9.333
3	1998	Italy (1st title)	8	77	9.625
3	2001	Italy (2nd title)	8	77	9.625
5	2015	United States (4th title)	7	72	10.286

Historical progression of records – goals for per match
Goals for per match	Achievement	Year	Champion	Date of winning gold	Duration of record
11.857	Set record	1986	Australia (1st title)	22 August 1986	26 years, 345 days
14.667	Broke record	2013	Spain (1st title)	2 August 2013	3 years, 360 days
15.333	Broke record	2017	United States (5th title)	28 July 2017	1 year, 363 days
15.500	Broke record	2019	United States (6th title)	26 July 2019	2 years, 341 days
15.667	Broke record	2022	United States (7th title)	2 July 2022	1 year, 26 days
17.333	Broke record	2023	Netherlands (2nd title)	28 July 2023	1 year, 360 days
17.429	Broke record	2025	Greece (2nd title)	23 July 2025	1 year, 55 days

The following tables show records of goals against per match.

Top 5 most goals against per match
Rk	Year	Champion	MP	GA	GA/MP
1	2025	Greece (2nd title)	7	67	9.571
2	2013	Spain (1st title)	6	53	8.833
3	2011	Greece (1st title)	6	51	8.500
4	2023	Netherlands (2nd title)	6	50	8.333
5	1991	Netherlands (1st title)	6	47	7.833

Top 5 fewest goals against per match
Rk	Year	Champion	MP	GA	GA/MP
1	2019	United States (6th title)	6	26	4.333
2	1986	Australia (1st title)	7	36	5.143
2	2015	United States (4th title)	7	36	5.143
4	2003	United States (1st title)	6	31	5.167
5	1994	Hungary (1st title)	7	38	5.429

The following tables show records of goals difference per match.

Top 5 most goals difference per match
Rk	Year	Champion	MP	GD	GD/MP
1	2019	United States (6th title)	6	67	11.167
2	2022	United States (7th title)	6	61	10.167
3	2017	United States (5th title)	6	55	9.167
4	2023	Netherlands (2nd title)	6	54	9.000
5	2024	United States (8th title)	6	51	8.500

Top 5 fewest goals difference per match
Rk	Year	Champion	MP	GD	GD/MP
1	2011	Greece (1st title)	6	11	1.833
2	1994	Hungary (1st title)	7	17	2.429
3	1998	Italy (1st title)	8	20	2.500
4	2007	United States (2nd title)	6	18	3.000
5	2009	United States (3rd title)	7	24	3.429

=== Player statistics ===
(C)	Captain	Apps	Appearances	Ref	Reference	Rk	Rank
L/R	Handedness	Pos	Playing position	FP	Field player	GK	Goalkeeper

==== Multiple gold medalists ====
The following table is pre-sorted by number of gold medals (in descending order), number of silver medals (in descending order), number of bronze medals (in descending order), name of the player (in ascending order), date of receiving the last gold medal (in ascending order), date of receiving the first gold medal (in ascending order), respectively.

Fourteen female athletes won three or more gold medals in water polo at the World Aquatics Championships. They were all members of the United States women's national water polo team. Rachel Fattal, Maddie Musselman and Maggie Steffens are the only athletes (men or women) to win five gold medals in water polo at the World Aquatics Championships.

There are twenty six female athletes who won two gold medals in water polo at the World Aquatics Championships.

Legend

- – Hosts

Female athletes who won three or more gold medals in water polo at the World Aquatics Championships
Rk	Player	Birth	Height	Women's team	Pos	Water polo tournament								Period (age of first/last)	Medals				Ref
Rk	Player	Birth	Height	Women's team	Pos	Water polo tournament								Period (age of first/last)	G	S	B	T	Ref
1	Rachel Fattal	1993	1.73 m (5 ft 8 in)	United States	FP	2013	2015	2017	2019	2022	2023	2024		11 years (19/30)	5	0	0	5	
1	Maddie Musselman	1998	1.81 m (5 ft 11 in)	United States	FP	2015	2017	2019	2022	2023	2024			8 years (17/25)	5	0	0	5	
1	Maggie Steffens	1993	1.73 m (5 ft 8 in)	United States	FP	2011	2013	2015	2017	2019	2022	2023	2024	12 years (18/30)	5	0	0	5	
4	Kaleigh Gilchrist	1992	1.76 m (5 ft 9 in)	United States	FP	2015		2019	2022	2023	2024			8 years (23/31)	4	0	0	4	
4	Ashleigh Johnson	1994	1.86 m (6 ft 1 in)	United States	GK	2015		2019	2022	2023	2024			9 years (20/29)	4	0	0	4	
4	Amanda Longan	1997	1.85 m (6 ft 1 in)	United States	GK	2017	2019	2022	2023	2024	2025			8 years (20/28)	4	0	0	4	
7	Heather Petri	1978	1.80 m (5 ft 11 in)	United States	FP	2001	2003	2005	2007	2009	2011			10 years (23/33)	3	1	0	4	
7	Brenda Villa	1980	1.63 m (5 ft 4 in)	United States	FP	1998	2001	2003	2005	2007	2009	2011		13 years (17/31)	3	1	0	4	
9	Kami Craig	1987	1.81 m (5 ft 11 in)	United States	FP	2007	2009	2011	2013	2015				8 years (19/28)	3	0	0	3	
9	Makenzie Fischer	1997	1.86 m (6 ft 1 in)	United States	FP	2015	2017	2019						4 years (18/22)	3	0	0	3	
9	Kiley Neushul	1993	1.73 m (5 ft 8 in)	United States	FP	2013	2015	2017	2019					6 years (20/26)	3	0	0	3	
9	Jordan Raney	1996	1.78 m (5 ft 10 in)	United States	FP	2017		2022	2023	2024				6 years (21/27)	3	0	0	3	
9	Melissa Seidemann	1990	1.83 m (6 ft 0 in)	United States	FP	2011	2013	2015	2017	2019				8 years (21/29)	3	0	0	3	
9	Alys Williams	1994	1.81 m (5 ft 11 in)	United States	FP	2015	2017	2019						4 years (21/25)	3	0	0	3	
Rk	Player	Birth	Height	Women's team	Pos	Water polo tournament								Period (age of first/last)	G	S	B	T	Ref
Rk	Player	Birth	Height	Women's team	Pos	Water polo tournament								Period (age of first/last)	Medals				Ref

==== Multiple medalists ====
The following table is pre-sorted by total number of medals (in descending order), number of gold medals (in descending order), number of silver medals (in descending order), name of the player (in ascending order), date of receiving the last medal (in ascending order), date of receiving the first medal (in ascending order), respectively.

Nine female athletes won five medals in water polo at the World Aquatics Championships. Spanish player Anni Espar is the only female athlete to win six medals in water polo at the World Aquatics Championships.

Legend

- – Hosts

Female athletes who won four medals in water polo at the World Aquatics Championships
Rk	Player	Birth	Height	Women's team	Pos	Water polo tournament											Period (age of first/last)	Medals				Ref
Rk	Player	Birth	Height	Women's team	Pos	Water polo tournament											Period (age of first/last)	G	S	B	T	Ref
1	Anni Espar	1993	1.80 m (5 ft 11 in)	Spain	FP	2011	2013	2015	2017	2019	2022	2023	2024	2025			14 years (18/32)	1	3	2	6	
2	Rachel Fattal	1993	1.73 m (5 ft 8 in)	United States	FP	2013	2015	2017	2019	2022	2023	2024					11 years (19/30)	5	0	0	5	
2	Maddie Musselman	1998	1.81 m (5 ft 11 in)	United States	FP	2015	2017	2019	2022	2023	2024						8 years (17/25)	5	0	0	5	
2	Maggie Steffens	1993	1.73 m (5 ft 8 in)	United States	FP	2011	2013	2015	2017	2019	2022	2023	2024				12 years (18/30)	5	0	0	5	
5	Laura Ester	1990	1.70 m (5 ft 7 in)	Spain	GK	2009	2011	2013	2015	2017	2019	2022	2023	2024			15 years (19/34)	1	3	1	5	
5	Pili Peña	1986	1.74 m (5 ft 9 in)	Spain	FP	2005	2007	2009	2011	2013	2015	2017	2019	2022	2023	2024	18 years (19/37)	1	3	1	5	
7	Paula Crespí	1998	1.75 m (5 ft 9 in)	Spain	FP	2017	2019		2023	2024	2025						8 years (19/27)	0	3	2	5	
7	Paula Leitón	2000	1.87 m (6 ft 2 in)	Spain	FP	2015	2017	2019	2022	2023	2024	2025					10 years (15/25)	0	3	2	5	
7	Beatriz Ortiz	1995	1.76 m (5 ft 9 in)	Spain	FP	2017	2019	2022	2023	2024	2025						8 years (22/30)	0	3	2	5	
Rk	Player	Birth	Height	Women's team	Pos	Water polo tournament											Period (age of first/last)	G	S	B	T	Ref
Rk	Player	Birth	Height	Women's team	Pos	Water polo tournament											Period (age of first/last)	Medals				Ref

== Combined medal table ==
The following table is pre-sorted by number of gold medals (in descending order), number of silver medals (in descending order), number of bronze medals (in descending order), name of the country (in ascending order), respectively.

Italy, Hungary and Spain are the only three countries to win both the men's and women's water polo tournaments at the World Aquatics Championships.

Legend

- ^{†} – Former country

Rank	Nation	Gold	Silver	Bronze	Total
1	United States	8	1	2	11
2	Hungary	6	12	2	20
3	Italy	6	5	4	15
4	Spain	5	7	5	17
5	Croatia	3	1	4	8
6	Netherlands	2	4	1	7
7	Greece	2	1	4	7
8	Serbia	2	1	1	4
8	Soviet Union^{†}	2	1	1	4
10	Yugoslavia^{†}	2	0	2	4
11	Australia	1	2	2	5
12	FR Yugoslavia^{†} / Serbia and Montenegro^{†}	1	1	2	4
13	Canada	0	2	2	4
14	China	0	1	0	1
14	Montenegro	0	1	0	1
16	Russia	0	0	7	7
17	West Germany^{†}	0	0	1	1
Totals (17 entries)		40	40	40	120

== See also ==
- List of World Aquatics Championships men's water polo tournament records and statistics
- List of World Aquatics Championships women's water polo tournament records and statistics
- List of world champions in men's water polo
- List of world champions in women's water polo
- List of World Aquatics Championships medalists in water polo
- Water polo at the Summer Olympics
- FINA Water Polo World Rankings
- List of water polo world medalists
- Major achievements in water polo by nation

== Sources ==
=== Official Reports (FINA) ===
PDF documents on the FINA website:

- HistoFINA – Water polo medalists and statistics (as of September 2019) (archive) (pp. 14–18, 57–62)

=== Official Results Books (FINA) ===
PDF documents on the Omega Timing website:

- 12th World Championship (2007)
  - General information, Men's Round Summary, Women's Round Summary.

PDF documents on the Sport Result website:

- 13th World Championship (2009)
  - Results, Participants, Statistics.
  - Men's Competition Schedule, Men's Round Summary, Women's Competition Schedule, Women's Round Summary.
- 14th World Championship (2011)
  - Results, Participants, Statistics.
  - Men's Competition Schedule, Men's Round Summary, Women's Competition Schedule, Women's Round Summary.
- 15th World Championship (2013)
  - Results, Participants, Statistics.
  - Men's Competition Schedule, Men's Round Summary, Women's Competition Schedule, Women's Round Summary.
- 16th World Championship (2015)
  - Results, Participants, Statistics.
  - Men's Competition Schedule, Men's Round Summary, Women's Competition Schedule, Women's Round Summary.
- 17th World Championship (2017)
  - Results, Participants, Statistics.
  - Men's Competition Schedule, Men's Round Summary, Women's Competition Schedule, Women's Round Summary.
- 18th World Championship (2019)
  - Results, Participants, Statistics.
  - Men's Competition Schedule, Men's Round Summary, Women's Competition Schedule, Women's Round Summary.
- 19th World Championship (2022)
  - Results, Participants, Statistics.
  - Men's Competition Schedule, Men's Round Summary, Women's Competition Schedule, Women's Round Summary.
- 20th World Championship (2023)
  - Results, Participants, Statistics.
  - Men's Competition Schedule, Men's Round Summary, Women's Competition Schedule, Women's Round Summary.
- 21st World Championship (2024)
  - Results, Participants, Statistics.
  - Men's Competition Schedule, Men's Round Summary, Women's Competition Schedule, Women's Round Summary.

=== Olympedia ===
Water polo on the Olympedia website:

- Olympians Who Won a Medal at the World Aquatics Championships

=== Todor66 ===
Water polo on the Todor66 website:

- Water Polo World Championship
- Men's Water Polo World Championship
- Women's Water Polo World Championship
- 1973 World Championship (men's tournament)
- 1975 World Championship (men's tournament)
- 1978 World Championship (men's tournament)
- 1982 World Championship (men's tournament)
- 1986 World Championship (men's tournament, women's tournament)
- 1991 World Championship (men's tournament, women's tournament)
- 1994 World Championship (men's tournament, women's tournament)
- 1998 World Championship (men's tournament, women's tournament)
- 2001 World Championship (men's tournament, women's tournament)
- 2003 World Championship (men's tournament, women's tournament)
- 2005 World Championship (men's tournament, women's tournament)
- 2007 World Championship (men's tournament, women's tournament)
- 2009 World Championship (men's tournament, women's tournament)
- 2011 World Championship (men's tournament, women's tournament)
- 2013 World Championship (men's tournament, women's tournament)
- 2015 World Championship (men's tournament, women's tournament)
- 2017 World Championship (men's tournament, women's tournament)
- 2019 World Championship (men's tournament, women's tournament)
- 2022 World Championship (men's tournament, women's tournament)
- 2023 World Championship (men's tournament, women's tournament)
- 2024 World Championship (men's tournament, women's tournament)
- 2025 World Championship (men's tournament, women's tournament)
