= Water polo at the 1986 World Aquatics Championships – Women's tournament =

1986 World Water Polo Championship
- 5th FINA World Aquatics Championships
- Location: Spain
- Date: 14–22 August
- Category: 1986 World Aquatics Championships

The 1986 Women's World Water Polo Championship was the first edition of the women's water polo tournament at the World Aquatics Championships, organised by the world governing body in aquatics, the FINA. The tournament was held from 14 to 22 August 1986, and was incorporated into the 1986 World Aquatics Championships in Madrid, Spain.

== Teams ==
GROUP A

- Canada
- Hungary
- Norway
- United States

GROUP B

- Australia
- Belgium
- Great Britain
- Netherlands
- West Germany

== Preliminary round ==
=== GROUP A ===
	Team	Points	G	W	D	L	GF	GA	Diff
1.	United States	5	3	2	1	0	32	18	+14
2.	Canada	5	3	2	1	0	27	17	+10
3.	Hungary	2	3	1	0	2	24	30	–6
4.	Norway	0	3	0	0	3	19	37	–18

=== GROUP B ===
	Team	Points	G	W	D	L	GF	GA	Diff
1.	Australia	8	4	4	0	0	53	19	+34
2.	Netherlands	6	4	3	0	1	56	19	+37
3.	West Germany	4	4	2	0	2	30	47	–17
4.	Belgium	2	4	1	0	3	25	54	–29
5.	Great Britain	0	4	0	0	4	23	48	–25

== Final round ==
=== GROUP C ===
	Team	Points	G	W	D	L	GF	GA	Diff
1.	Australia	10	5	5	0	0	54	30	+24
2.	Netherlands	8	5	4	0	1	55	30	+25
3.	United States	5	5	2	1	2	45	34	+11
4.	Canada	5	5	2	1	2	38	35	+3
5.	Hungary	2	5	1	0	4	37	52	–15
6.	West Germany	0	5	0	0	5	23	71	–48

=== GROUP D ===
	Team	Points	G	W	D	L	GF	GA	Diff
7.	Norway	4	2	2	0	0	21	17	+4
8.	Belgium	2	2	1	0	1	20	19	+1
9.	Great Britain	0	2	0	0	2	17	22	–5

== Final ranking ==
RANK	TEAM
	Australia
	Netherlands
	United States
4.	Canada
5.	Hungary
6.	West Germany
7.	Norway
8.	Belgium
9.	Great Britain

1986 FINA Women's World champion

Australia
First title

== Individual awards ==
- Most Valuable Player

- ???

- Best Goalkeeper

- ???

RANK	TOPSCORERS	GOALS
1.	Alice Lindhout (NED)	26
2.	Debbie Handley (AUS)	22
3.	Greet van den Veen (NED)	18

== Medalists ==
Gold	Silver	Bronze
Australia Judy Gair; Cummins Handley; Amanda Leeson; Katie Mcadams; Megan Meloncelli; Lynne Morrison; Sandy Mills-O'mellia; Jackie Northam; Cathy Parkers; Janet Rayner; Julie Sheperd; Debbie Watson	Netherlands Anita Bibo; Hellen Boering; Janet Heijnert; Monique Kranenburg; Patricia Libregts; Alice Lindhout; Ineke Pesman; Janny Spijker; Lieneke van den Heuvel; Greet van den Veen; Marjo van der Mark; Madeline van Heemstra; Hedda Verdam	United States Theresa Breckon; Lynn Comer; Yolanda Gascon; Dion Gray; Vaune Kadlubek; Marybeth Kolding; Simone LaPay; Laura Laughlin; Maureen O'Toole; Marla Smith; Jill Sterkel; Lyn Taylor; Lynn Wittstock
