= Water polo at the 2017 World Aquatics Championships =

Water polo events at the 2017 World Aquatics Championships were held between 16 and 29 July 2017 in Budapest, Hungary.

== Schedule ==
Two competitions were held.

All time are local (UTC+2).

Date	Time	Round
16 July 2017	08:30	Preliminary round
17 July 2017	08:30	Preliminary round
18 July 2017	08:30	Preliminary round
19 July 2017	08:30	Preliminary round
20 July 2017	08:30	Preliminary round
21 July 2017	08:30	Preliminary round
22 July 2017	10:30	Play-offs/Placement matches
23 July 2017	10:30	Play-offs/Placement matches
24 July 2017	09:30	Quarterfinals/Placement matches
25 July 2017	09:30	Quarterfinals/Placement matches
26 July 2017	10:30	Semifinals/Placement matches
27 July 2017	10:30	Semifinals/Placement matches
28 July 2017	12:00	Women's finals
29 July 2017	12:00	Men's finals

== Medal summary ==
=== Medal table ===
Rank	Nation	Gold	Silver	Bronze	Total
1	Croatia	1	0	0	1
1	United States	1	0	0	1
3	Hungary	0	1	0	1
3	Spain	0	1	0	1
5	Russia	0	0	1	1
5	Serbia	0	0	1	1
Totals (6 entries)		2	2	2	6

=== Medal events ===
Event	Gold	Silver	Bronze
Men	Croatia Marko Bijač; Andro Bušlje; Ivan Buljubašić; Loren Fatović; Xavier García; Maro Joković; Ivan Krapić; Luka Lončar; Marko Macan; Ivan Marcelić; Anđelo Šetka; Sandro Sukno; Ante Vukičević	Hungary Ádám Decker; Attila Decker; Balázs Erdélyi; Balázs Hárai; Norbert Hosnyánszky; Miklós Gór-Nagy; Krisztián Manhercz; Tamás Mezei; Viktor Nagy; Béla Török; Márton Vámos; Dénes Varga; Gergő Zalánki	Serbia Milan Aleksić; Miloš Ćuk; Filip Filipović; Nikola Jakšić; Dušan Mandić; Branislav Mitrović; Stefan Mitrović; Duško Pijetlović; Gojko Pijetlović; Andrija Prlainović; Sava Ranđelović; Viktor Rašović; Nemanja Ubović
Women	United States Rachel Fattal; Aria Fischer; Makenzie Fischer; Paige Hauschild; Amanda Longan; Madeline Musselman; Jamie Neushul; Kiley Neushul; Jordan Raney; Melissa Seidemann; Maggie Steffens; Gabrielle Stone; Alys Williams	Spain Marta Bach; Paula Crespi; Sandra Domene; Anni Espar; Clara Espar; Laura Ester; Judith Forca; Anna Gual; Paula Leiton; Helena Lloret; Beatriz Ortiz; Matilde Ortiz; María del Pilar Peña	Russia Maria Borisova; Olga Gorbunova; Evgeniya Ivanova; Elvina Karimova; Anna Karnaukh; Ekaterina Prokofyeva; Daria Ryzhkova; Alena Serzhantova; Anastasia Simanovich; Anna Timofeeva; Tatiana Tolkunova; Anna Ustiukhina; Veronika Vakhitova
