= 2019 FINA Women's Water Polo World League =

- League: FINA Water Polo World League
- Sport: Water Polo
- Duration: 3 November 2018 to 9 June 2019

Super Final
- Finals champions: United States (13th title)
- Runners-up: Italy
- Finals MVP: (United States) Maddie Musselman

FINA Women's Water Polo World League seasons
- ← 2018 2020 →

The 2019 FINA Women's Water Polo World League was the 16th edition of the annual women's international water polo tournament. It was played between November 2018 and June 2019 and open to all women's water polo national teams. After participating in a preliminary round, eight teams qualified to play in a final tournament, called the Super Final from 4–9 June 2019.

In the world league, there are specific rules that do not allow matches to end in a draw. If teams are level at the end of the 4th quarter of any world league match, the match will be decided by a penalty shootout. Teams earn points in the standings in group matches as follows:

- Match won in normal time - 3 points
- Match won in shootout - 2 points
- Match lost in shootout - 1 point
- Match lost in normal time - 0 points

== Preliminary rounds ==
=== European Preliminaries ===
- November, 2018 – May, 2019

==== Group A ====
Pos	Team	Pld	W	OTW	OTL	L	GF	GA	GD	Pts	Qualification	Russia	Spain	Greece	Israel
1	Russia	6	5	1	0	0	97	52	+45	17	Europa Cup Final	—	12–9	17–13	28–5
2	Spain	6	4	0	1	1	62	47	+15	13	Europa Cup Final	12–14 (PSO)	—	8–7	11–5
3	Greece	6	2	0	0	4	83	79	+4	6	Europa Cup Final	10–11	7–11	—	24–5
4	Israel	6	0	0	0	6	29	93	−64	0		5–19	6–13	8–17	—

Source: FINA
Rules for classification: Only goals scored in regular time are counted.

==== Group B ====
Pos	Team	Pld	W	OTW	OTL	L	GF	GA	GD	Pts	Qualification	Italy	Hungary	Netherlands	France
1	Italy	6	5	0	0	1	60	51	+9	15	Europa Cup Final	—	13–12	9–6	7–6
2	Hungary	6	3	1	0	2	59	51	+8	11	Europa Cup Final	12–8	—	10–11	13–4
3	Netherlands	6	3	0	1	2	72	46	+26	10	Europa Cup Final	7–9	13–14 (PSO)	—	19–2
4	France	6	0	0	0	6	34	84	−50	0		8–14	5–12	6–18	—

Source: FINA
Rules for classification: Only goals scored in regular time are counted.

=== Europa Cup Final ===
- March 29–31, 2019, Turin, Italy

Source: FINA

Quarterfinals
29 March
Hungary	13
Greece	9
29 March
Spain	6
Netherlands	9

Semifinals
30 March
Russia	15
Hungary	14
30 March
Italy	11
Netherlands	17

Gold medal match
31 March
Russia	9
Netherlands	11
Bronze medal match
31 March
Hungary	13
Italy	11

==== Quarterfinals ====
All times are CET (UTC+1).

29 March 2019; 15:30	Hungary	13–9	Greece	Turin, Italy; Referees: Alexandrescu (ROU), Ferrari (ITA)
29 March 2019; 15:30	Score by quarters: 4–1, 4–3, 3–3, 2–2			Turin, Italy; Referees: Alexandrescu (ROU), Ferrari (ITA)
29 March 2019; 15:30	Parkes 3	Goals	Tsoukala, Chydirioti 2	Turin, Italy; Referees: Alexandrescu (ROU), Ferrari (ITA)

29 March 2019; 17:00	Spain	6–9	Netherlands	Turin, Italy; Referees: Naumov (RUS), Savinovic (CRO)
29 March 2019; 17:00	Score by quarters: 1–3, 2–2, 2–3, 1–1			Turin, Italy; Referees: Naumov (RUS), Savinovic (CRO)
29 March 2019; 17:00	A. Espar, B. Ortiz 2	Goals	Megens, van der Sloot 3	Turin, Italy; Referees: Naumov (RUS), Savinovic (CRO)

==== Semifinals ====
All times are CET (UTC+1).

30 March 2019; 15:00	Russia	15–14	Hungary	Turin, Italy; Referees: Savinovic (CRO), Colominas (ESP)
30 March 2019; 15:00	Score by quarters: 4–3, 4–4, 5–5, 2–2			Turin, Italy; Referees: Savinovic (CRO), Colominas (ESP)
30 March 2019; 15:00	Karimova 5	Goals	Keszthelyi 5	Turin, Italy; Referees: Savinovic (CRO), Colominas (ESP)

30 March 2019; 16:30	Italy	11–17	Netherlands	Turin, Italy; Referees: Alexandrescu (ROU), Kouretas (GRE)
30 March 2019; 16:30	Score by quarters: 3–4, 1–4, 3–5, 4–4			Turin, Italy; Referees: Alexandrescu (ROU), Kouretas (GRE)
30 March 2019; 16:30	Bianconi 3	Goals	Megens, Keuning 4	Turin, Italy; Referees: Alexandrescu (ROU), Kouretas (GRE)

==== 5th place match ====
All times are CET (UTC+1).

30 March 2019; 18:00	Greece	14–17	Spain	Turin, Italy; Referees: Dutilh-Dumas (NED), Marjay (HUN)
30 March 2019; 18:00	Score by quarters: 3–6, 5–4, 2–5, 4–2			Turin, Italy; Referees: Dutilh-Dumas (NED), Marjay (HUN)
30 March 2019; 18:00	Eleftheriadou 5	Goals	B. Ortiz 8	Turin, Italy; Referees: Dutilh-Dumas (NED), Marjay (HUN)

==== Bronze medal match ====
All times are CEST (UTC+2).

31 March 2019; 15:00	(bronze) Hungary	13–11	Italy	Turin, Italy; Referees: Savinovic (CRO), Colominas (ESP)
31 March 2019; 15:00	Score by quarters: 5–5, 3–1, 2–3, 3–2			Turin, Italy; Referees: Savinovic (CRO), Colominas (ESP)
31 March 2019; 15:00	Keszthelyi 6	Goals	Bianconi 4	Turin, Italy; Referees: Savinovic (CRO), Colominas (ESP)

==== Gold medal match ====
All times are CEST (UTC+2).

31 March 2019; 16:30	(silver) Russia	9–11	Netherlands (gold)	Turin, Italy; Referees: Alexandrescu (ROU), Ferrari (ITA)
31 March 2019; 16:30	Score by quarters: 1–2, 2–4, 2–3, 4–2			Turin, Italy; Referees: Alexandrescu (ROU), Ferrari (ITA)
31 March 2019; 16:30	Karimova 4 Gorbunova, Bersneva, Prokofyeva, Serzhantova, Timofeeva	Goals	Megens 4 Wolves 3 Stomphorst, van de Kraats 2	Turin, Italy; Referees: Alexandrescu (ROU), Ferrari (ITA)

==== Final ranking ====
Qualified to Super Final

Rank	Team
Gold medal	Netherlands
Silver medal	Russia
Bronze medal	Hungary
4	Italy
5	Spain
6	Greece

=== Intercontinental Cup ===
- March 23–31, 2019, Perth, Australia

==== Group A ====
Pos	Team	Pld	W	OTW	OTL	L	GF	GA	GD	Pts	Qualification	United States	People's Republic of China	Japan	New Zealand
1	United States	3	3	0	0	0	59	15	+44	9	Quarterfinals	—	11–5	18–7	30–3
2	China	3	2	0	0	1	37	25	+12	6	Quarterfinals	5–11	—	8–7	24–7
3	Japan	3	1	0	0	2	26	33	−7	3	Quarterfinals	7–18	7–8	—	12–7
4	New Zealand	3	0	0	0	3	17	66	−49	0	Quarterfinals	3–30	7–24	7–12	—

Source: FINA
Rules for classification: Only goals scored in regular time are counted.

==== Group B ====
Pos	Team	Pld	W	OTW	OTL	L	GF	GA	GD	Pts	Qualification	Australia	Canada	Kazakhstan	South Africa
1	Australia (H)	3	3	0	0	0	49	16	+33	9	Quarterfinals	—	13–9	15–4	21–3
2	Canada	3	2	0	0	1	38	21	+17	6	Quarterfinals	9–13	—	13–4	16–4
3	Kazakhstan	3	1	0	0	2	20	37	−17	3	Quarterfinals	4–15	4–13	—	12–9
4	South Africa	3	0	0	0	3	16	49	−33	0	Quarterfinals	3–21	4–16	9–12	—

Source: FINA
Rules for classification: Only goals scored in regular time are counted.
(H) Host

5th–8th place bracket

5th–8th place semifinals
30 March
Kazakhstan	14
New Zealand	12
30 March
Japan	12
South Africa	7

Fifth place game
31 March
Kazakhstan	7
Japan	16
Seventh place game
31 March
New Zealand	11
South Africa	8

Championship bracket

Quarterfinals
29 March
China	16
Kazakhstan	15
29 March
New Zealand	4
Australia	15
29 March
Japan	6
Canada	9
29 March
United States	22
South Africa	4

Semifinals
30 March
China	8
Australia	12
30 March
Canada	7
United States	14

Gold medal match
31 March
Australia	12
United States	14
Bronze medal match
31 March
China	11
Canada	8

==== Bronze medal match ====
All times are AWST (UTC+8).

31 March 2019; 16:15	(bronze) China	11–8	Canada	Perth, Australia
31 March 2019; 16:15	Score by quarters: 2–2, 4–2, 2–1, 3–3			Perth, Australia
31 March 2019; 16:15	Wang Huan 3	Goals	Alogbo 2	Perth, Australia

==== Gold medal match ====
All times are AWST (UTC+8).

31 March 2019; 17:30	(silver) Australia	12–14 (PSO)	United States (gold)	Perth, Australia
31 March 2019; 17:30	Score by quarters: 3–3, 1–5, 2–1, 3–0 PSO: 3–5			Perth, Australia
31 March 2019; 17:30	Gofers 4 Webster 3 Buckling 2 three players 1	Goals	Haralabidis, K. Neushul, Gilchrist 3 J. Neushul 2 three players 1	Perth, Australia

==== Final ranking ====
Qualified to Super Final

Rank	Team
Gold medal	United States
Silver medal	Australia
Bronze medal	China
4	Canada
5	Japan
6	Kazakhstan
7	New Zealand
8	South Africa

== Super Final ==
- June 4–9, 2019, Budapest, Hungary

=== Venue ===
Budapest	2019 FINA Women's Water Polo World League (Hungary)
Danube Arena	2019 FINA Women's Water Polo World League (Hungary)
Capacity: 12,500 expanded	2019 FINA Women's Water Polo World League (Hungary)

=== Qualified teams ===
Africa	Americas	Asia	Europe	Oceania
—	Canada; United States	China	Hungary; Italy; Netherlands; Russia	Australia

=== Seeding ===
Group A	Group B
Netherlands (1st Europa Cup); Italy (4th Europa Cup); Australia (2nd ICC); China (3rd ICC)	United States (1st ICC); Canada (4th ICC); Russia (2nd Europa Cup); Hungary (3rd Europa Cup)

=== Preliminary round ===
==== Group A ====
All times are CEST (UTC+2).

Pos	Team	Pld	W	OTW	OTL	L	GF	GA	GD	Pts	Qualification	Italy	Netherlands	Australia	People's Republic of China
1	Italy	3	3	0	0	0	29	23	+6	9	Quarterfinals	—	8–7	11–9	10–7
2	Netherlands	3	2	0	0	1	30	22	+8	6	Quarterfinals	7–8	—	8–7	15–7
3	Australia	3	1	0	0	2	26	27	−1	3	Quarterfinals	9–11	7–8	—	10–8
4	China	3	0	0	0	3	22	35	−13	0	Quarterfinals	7–10	7–15	8–10	—

Source: FINA
Rules for classification: Only goals scored in regular time are counted.

4 June 2019; 16:15	Netherlands	15–7	China	Budapest, Hungary
4 June 2019; 16:15	Score by quarters: 4–2, 4–2, 3–3, 4–0			Budapest, Hungary

4 June 2019; 20:15	Australia	9–11	Italy	Budapest, Hungary
4 June 2019; 20:15	Score by quarters: 3–2, 3–5, 2–2, 1–2			Budapest, Hungary

5 June 2019; 15:00	Australia	10–8	China	Budapest, Hungary
5 June 2019; 15:00	Score by quarters: 2–2, 2–1, 3–3, 3–2			Budapest, Hungary

5 June 2019; 18:30	Netherlands	7–8	Italy	Budapest, Hungary
5 June 2019; 18:30	Score by quarters: 2–1, 2–2, 1–3, 2–2			Budapest, Hungary

6 June 2019; 16:45	Netherlands	8–7	Australia	Budapest, Hungary
6 June 2019; 16:45	Score by quarters: 2–3, 4–2, 2–1, 0–1			Budapest, Hungary

6 June 2019; 20:15	China	7–10	Italy	Budapest, Hungary
6 June 2019; 20:15	Score by quarters: 2–3, 1–2, 2–2, 2–3			Budapest, Hungary

==== Group B ====
All times are CEST (UTC+2).

Pos	Team	Pld	W	OTW	OTL	L	GF	GA	GD	Pts	Qualification	United States	Russia	Hungary	Canada
1	United States	3	3	0	0	0	39	20	+19	9	Quarterfinals	—	12–7	12–9	15–4
2	Russia	3	1	1	0	1	36	36	0	5	Quarterfinals	7–12	—	14–9	19–17 (PSO)
3	Hungary (H)	3	1	0	0	2	34	40	−6	3	Quarterfinals	9–12	9–14	—	16–14
4	Canada	3	0	0	1	2	33	46	−13	1	Quarterfinals	4–15	17–19 (PSO)	14–16	—

Source: FINA
Rules for classification: Only goals scored in regular time are counted.
(H) Host

4 June 2019; 14:30	Russia	19–17 (PSO)	Canada	Budapest, Hungary
4 June 2019; 14:30	Score by quarters: 3–3, 4–3, 1–5, 7–4 PSO: 4–2			Budapest, Hungary

4 June 2019; 18:30	United States	12–9	Hungary	Budapest, Hungary
4 June 2019; 18:30	Score by quarters: 2–3, 4–1, 2–2, 4–3			Budapest, Hungary

5 June 2019; 16:45	United States	15–4	Canada	Budapest, Hungary
5 June 2019; 16:45	Score by quarters: 6–0, 3–2, 4–2, 2–0			Budapest, Hungary

5 June 2019; 20:15	Russia	14–9	Hungary	Budapest, Hungary
5 June 2019; 20:15	Score by quarters: 4–3, 3–1, 2–1, 5–4			Budapest, Hungary

6 June 2019; 15:00	Russia	7–12	United States	Budapest, Hungary
6 June 2019; 15:00	Score by quarters: 3–5, 0–2, 3–3, 1–2			Budapest, Hungary

6 June 2019; 18:30	Canada	14–16	Hungary	Budapest, Hungary
6 June 2019; 18:30	Score by quarters: 2–3, 8–5, 3–5, 1–3			Budapest, Hungary

=== Final round ===
5th–8th place bracket

5th–8th place classification
8 June
Hungary	15
China	14
8 June
Australia	15
Canada	9

5th place match
9 June
Hungary	7
Australia	12
7th place match
9 June
China	10
Canada	13

==== 5th–8th place classification ====
All times are CEST (UTC+2).

8 June 2019; 15:00	Hungary	15–14	China	Budapest, Hungary
8 June 2019; 15:00	Score by quarters: 3–1, 5–3, 4–5, 3–5			Budapest, Hungary

8 June 2019; 16:45	Australia	15–9	Canada	Budapest, Hungary
8 June 2019; 16:45	Score by quarters: 2–3, 4–0, 3–2, 6–4			Budapest, Hungary

==== 7th place match ====
All times are CEST (UTC+2).

9 June 2019; 15:00	China	10–13	Canada	Budapest, Hungary
9 June 2019; 15:00	Score by quarters: 4–2, 2–4, 1–2, 3–5			Budapest, Hungary

==== 5th place match ====
All times are CEST (UTC+2).

9 June 2019; 16:45	Hungary	7–12	Australia	Budapest, Hungary
9 June 2019; 16:45	Score by quarters: 3–2, 2–3, 0–3, 2–4			Budapest, Hungary

Championship bracket

Quarterfinals
7 June
Netherlands	12
Hungary	10
7 June
China	6
United States	21
7 June
Australia	8
Russia	9
7 June
Italy	15
Canada	10

Semifinals
8 June
Netherlands	6
United States	8
8 June
Russia	12
Italy	13

Gold medal match
9 June
United States	10
Italy	9
Bronze medal match
9 June
Netherlands	7
Russia	10

==== Quarterfinals ====
All times are CEST (UTC+2).

7 June 2019; 15:00	Australia	8–9	Russia	Budapest, Hungary
7 June 2019; 15:00	Score by quarters: 1–3, 3–1, 0–3, 4–2			Budapest, Hungary

7 June 2019; 16:45	Italy	15–10	Canada	Budapest, Hungary
7 June 2019; 16:45	Score by quarters: 3–3, 2–1, 6–3, 4–3			Budapest, Hungary

7 June 2019; 18:30	Netherlands	12–10	Hungary	Budapest, Hungary
7 June 2019; 18:30	Score by quarters: 2–2, 4–1, 3–4, 3–3			Budapest, Hungary

7 June 2019; 20:15	China	6–21	United States	Budapest, Hungary
7 June 2019; 20:15	Score by quarters: 1–6, 1–6, 1–5, 3–4			Budapest, Hungary

==== Semifinals ====
All times are CEST (UTC+2).

8 June 2019; 18:30	Netherlands	6–8	United States	Budapest, Hungary
8 June 2019; 18:30	Score by quarters: 1–3, 2–3, 2–1, 1–1			Budapest, Hungary

8 June 2019; 20:15	Russia	12–13 (PSO)	Italy	Budapest, Hungary
8 June 2019; 20:15	Score by quarters: 2–6, 2–1, 1–1, 4–1 PSO: 3–4			Budapest, Hungary

==== Bronze medal match ====
All times are CEST (UTC+2).

9 June 2019; 18:30	Netherlands	7–10	Russia (bronze)	Budapest, Hungary
9 June 2019; 18:30	Score by quarters: 2–3, 2–1, 2–4, 1–2			Budapest, Hungary
9 June 2019; 18:30	Megens, van der Sloot, Wolves 2 Koolhaas 1	Goals	Prokofyeva 3 seven players 1	Budapest, Hungary

==== Gold medal match ====
All times are CEST (UTC+2).

9 June 2019; 20:15	(gold) United States	10–9	Italy (silver)	Budapest, Hungary
9 June 2019; 20:15	Score by quarters: 2–2, 1–2, 4–2, 3–3			Budapest, Hungary
9 June 2019; 20:15	M. Fischer 4 Musselman 2 A. Fischer, Fattal, Haralabidis, Neushul 1	Goals	Tabani, Garibotti, Chiappini 2 Bianconi, Emmolo, Palmieri 1	Budapest, Hungary

=== Final ranking ===
Qualified to the 2020 Summer Olympics

Rank	Team
Gold medal	United States
Silver medal	Italy
Bronze medal	Russia
4	Netherlands
5	Australia
6	Hungary
7	Canada
8	China

2019 FINA Women's Water Polo World League

United States
13th title

Team Roster

Amanda Longan, Maddie Musselman, Melissa Seidemann, Rachel Fattal, Paige Hauschild, Maggie Steffens (C), Jamie Neushul, Kiley Neushul, Aria Fischer, Kaleigh Gilchrist, Makenzie Fischer, Alys Williams, Ashleigh Johnson, Jordan Raney, Stephania Haralabidis. Head coach: Adam Krikorian.

=== Individual awards ===
- Most Valuable Player
  - (United States) Maddie Musselman
- Best Goalkeeper
  - (Netherlands) Laura Aarts
- Top Scorer
  - (Netherlands) Maud Megens (Hungary) Rita Keszthelyi — 17 goals
