= United States women's national water polo team =

United States
- FINA code: USA
- Association: USA Water Polo
- Confederation: UANA (Americas)
- Head coach: Adam Krikorian
- Asst coach: Molly Cahill; Daniel Klatt

FINA ranking (since 2008)
- Current: 2 (as of August 9, 2021)
- Highest: 1 (2009–2012, 2013–2019)
- Lowest: 2 (2008, 2013, 2021)

Olympic Games (team statistics)
- Appearances: 7 (first in 2000)
- Best result: (2012, 2016, 2020)

World Championship
- Appearances: 18 (first in 1986)
- Best result: (2003, 2007, 2009, 2015, 2017, 2019, 2022, 2024)

World Cup
- Appearances: 19 (first in 1979)
- Best result: (1979, 2010, 2014, 2018, 2023, 2026)

World League
- Appearances: 18 (first in 2004)
- Best result: (2004, 2006, 2007, 2009, 2010, 2011, 2012, 2014, 2015, 2016, 2017, 2018, 2019, 2020)

Pan American Games
- Appearances: 7 (first in 1999)
- Best result: (2003, 2007, 2011, 2015, 2019, 2023)

Pan American Championships
- Best result: (2013, 2024)

Media
- Website: usawaterpolo.org
Medal record
Women's water polo
Olympic Games
Gold medal – first place	2012 London	Team
Gold medal – first place	2016 Rio de Janeiro	Team
Gold medal – first place	2020 Tokyo	Team
Silver medal – second place	2000 Sydney	Team
Silver medal – second place	2008 Beijing	Team
Bronze medal – third place	2004 Athens	Team
World Championship
Gold medal – first place	2003 Barcelona	Team
Gold medal – first place	2007 Melbourne	Team
Gold medal – first place	2009 Rome	Team
Gold medal – first place	2015 Kazan	Team
Gold medal – first place	2017 Budapest	Team
Gold medal – first place	2019 Gwangju	Team
Gold medal – first place	2022 Budapest	Team
Gold medal – first place	2024 Doha	Team
Silver medal – second place	2005 Montreal	Team
Bronze medal – third place	1986 Madrid	Team
Bronze medal – third place	1991 Perth	Team
World Cup
Gold medal – first place	1979 Merced
Gold medal – first place	2010 Christchurch
Gold medal – first place	2014 Khanty-Mansiysk
Gold medal – first place	2018 Surgut
Gold medal – first place	2023 Long Beach
Gold medal – first place	2026 Sydney
Silver medal – second place	1980 Breda
Silver medal – second place	1983 Sainte-Foy
Silver medal – second place	1984 Irvine
Silver medal – second place	1989 Eindhoven
Silver medal – second place	2002 Perth
Bronze medal – third place	1991 Long Beach
World League
Gold medal – first place	2004 Long Beach
Gold medal – first place	2006 Cosenza
Gold medal – first place	2007 Montreal
Gold medal – first place	2009 Kirishi
Gold medal – first place	2010 La Jolla
Gold medal – first place	2011 Tianjin
Gold medal – first place	2012 Changshu
Gold medal – first place	2014 Kunshan
Gold medal – first place	2015 Shanghai
Gold medal – first place	2016 Shanghai
Gold medal – first place	2017 Shanghai
Gold medal – first place	2018 Kunshan
Gold medal – first place	2019 Budapest
Gold medal – first place	2020 Athens
Silver medal – second place	2008 Santa Cruz
Bronze medal – third place	2013 Beijing
Bronze medal – third place	2022 Santa Cruz
Pan American Games
Gold medal – first place	2003 Santo Domingo	Team
Gold medal – first place	2007 Rio de Janeiro	Team
Gold medal – first place	2011 Guadalajara	Team
Gold medal – first place	2015 Toronto	Team
Gold medal – first place	2019 Lima	Team
Gold medal – first place	2023 Santiago	Team
Silver medal – second place	1999 Winnipeg	Team
Pan American Championships
Gold medal – first place	2013 Costa Mesa
Gold medal – first place	2024 Ibagué

The United States women's national water polo team represents the United States in international women's water polo competitions and friendly matches. It is one of the leading teams in the world since the late 1990s. Women's water polo has been on the international stage since 1978 and was an exhibition sport at the 1984 Los Angeles Olympics coached by Sandy Nitta before being introduced as a full medal sport in 2000.

On March 27, 2009, USA Water Polo named Adam Krikorian the head coach of the United States women's national team. Krikorian was the UCLA men's and women's water polo team head coach.

== Results ==
=== Major tournaments ===
==== Competitive record ====
Updated after the 2026 Women's Water Polo World Cup.

Tournament	Appearances	Finishes				
Tournament	Appearances	Champions	Runners-up	Third place	Fourth place	Total
Olympic Games	7	3	2	1	1	7
World Championship	18	8	1	2	3	14
World Cup	20	6	5	1	3	15
World League	18	14	1	2	0	17
Pan American Games	7	6	1	0	0	7
Total	70	37	10	6	7	60

==== Olympic Games ====
Year	Result	Pld	W	L	D
(Australia) 2000	Silver medal	7	4	2	1
(Greece) 2004	Bronze medal	5	3	2	0
(China) 2008	Silver medal	5	3	1	1
(United Kingdom) 2012	Gold medal	6	5	0	1
(Brazil) 2016	Gold medal	6	6	0	0
(Japan) 2020	Gold medal	7	6	1	0
(France) 2024	4th place	7	4	3	0
Total	3 Titles	43	31	9	3

==== World Championship ====
Year	Result	Pld	W	L	D
(Spain) 1986	Bronze medal	8	4	2	2
(Australia) 1991	Bronze medal	6	3	2	1
(Italy) 1994	4th place	7	4	2	1
(Australia) 1998	8th place	7	2	4	1
(Japan) 2001	4th place	8	5	2	1
(Spain) 2003	Gold medal	6	6	0	0
(Canada) 2005	Silver medal	7	4	2	1
(Australia) 2007	Gold medal	6	6	0	0
(Italy) 2009	Gold medal	7	6	1	0
(China) 2011	6th place	6	3	2	1
(Spain) 2013	5th place	7	6	1	0
(Russia) 2015	Gold medal	7	6	1	0
(Hungary) 2017	Gold medal	6	6	0	0
(South Korea) 2019	Gold medal	6	6	0	0
(Hungary) 2022	Gold medal	6	6	0	0
(Japan) 2023	5th place	6	5	1	0
(Qatar) 2024	Gold medal	6	6	0	0
(Singapore) 2025	4th place	6	4	2	0
Total	8 Titles	118	88	22	8

==== World Cup ====
Year	Result	Pld	W	L	D
(United States) 1979	Gold medal	4	3	0	1
(Netherlands) 1980	Silver medal	4	2	1	1
(Australia) 1981	4th place	—N/a			
(Canada) 1983	Silver medal	6	3	2	1
(United States) 1984	Silver medal	—N/a			
(New Zealand) 1988	4th place	—N/a			
(Netherlands) 1989	Silver medal	—N/a			
(United States) 1991	Bronze medal	—N/a			
(Italy) 1993	5th place	—N/a			
(Australia) 1995	6th place	—N/a			
(France) 1997	7th place	—N/a			
(Canada) 1999	6th place	5	2	2	1
(Australia) 2002	Silver medal	5	3	1	1
(China) 2006	4th place	5	3	2	0
(New Zealand) 2010	Gold medal	6	5	1	0
(Russia) 2014	Gold medal	6	6	0	0
(Russia) 2018	Gold medal	6	6	0	0
(United States) 2023	Gold medal	9	7	2	0
(China) 2025	Division 1	6	1	5	0
(Australia) 2026	Gold medal	9	8	1	0
Total	6 Titles	71	49	17	5

==== World League ====
Year	Result	Pld	W	L	D
(United States) 2004	Gold medal	5	4	1	0
(Russia) 2005	5th place	14	10	4	0
(Italy) 2006	Gold medal	12	10	2	0
(Canada) 2007	Gold medal	7	7	0	0
(Spain) 2008	Silver medal	6	5	1	0
(Russia) 2009	Gold medal	5	5	0	0
(United States) 2010	Gold medal	3	3	0	0
(China) 2011	Gold medal	3	3	0	0
(China) 2012	Gold medal	10	10	0	0
(China) 2013	Bronze medal	3	2	1	0
(China) 2014	Gold medal	12	11	1	0
(China) 2015	Gold medal	12	12	0	0
(China) 2016	Gold medal	11	11	0	0
(China) 2017	Gold medal	12	11	1	0
(China) 2018	Gold medal	11	10	1	0
(Hungary) 2019	Gold medal	12	12	0	0
(Greece) 2020	Gold medal	6	6	0	0
(Spain) 2022	Bronze medal	11	8	3	0
Total	14 Titles	155	140	15	0

==== Pan American Games ====
Year	Result	Pld	W	L	D
(Canada) 1999	Silver medal	6	3	3	0
(Dominican Republic) 2003	Gold medal	6	5	0	1
(Brazil) 2007	Gold medal	7	7	0	0
(Mexico) 2011	Gold medal	5	5	0	0
(Canada) 2015	Gold medal	5	5	0	0
(Peru) 2019	Gold medal	6	6	0	0
(Chile) 2023	Gold medal	6	6	0	0
Total	6 Titles	41	37	3	1

=== Minor tournaments ===
The United States is usually represented by a U20 team in these competitions.

==== Summer Universiade ====
Year	Result
2011	(silver) Silver medal
2013	8th place
2015	5th place
2017	(gold) Gold medal
2019	8th place
Total	1 Title

==== Pan American Championships ====
Year	Result
(Canada) 2009	Cancelled
(Brazil) 2011	Did not participated
(Canada) 2013 (A)	Did not participated
(United States) 2013 (B)	Gold medal
(Canada) 2015	Did not participated
2017	Not scheduled
2018	Not scheduled
(Brazil) 2019	Did not participated
2021	Cancelled
(Brazil) 2023	Did not participated
(Colombia) 2024	Gold medal
Total	2 Titles

==== Holiday Cup ====
Year	Result
1998	(silver) Silver medal
1999	(bronze) Bronze medal
2000	(gold) Gold medal
2001	(gold) Gold medal
2002	(gold) Gold medal
2003	(gold) Gold medal
2004	(gold) Gold medal
2006	(gold) Gold medal
2007	(bronze) Bronze medal
Total	6 Titles

==== Kirishi Cup ====
Year	Result
2014	(gold) Gold medal
Total	1 Title

==== World Games ====
Year	Result
1981	(silver) Silver medal (World Cup team)
Total	0 Title

==== Olympic Year Tournament ====
Year	Result
1996	7th place
Total	0 Title

== Team ==
=== Current squad ===
Roster for the 2026 World Cup.

Head coach: Adam Krikorian

- 1 Amanda Longan GK
- 2 Ava Stryker AK
- 3 Tara Prentice UT
- 4 Rachel Fattal AK
- 5 Jenna Flynn AK
- 6 Ella Woodhead C
- 7 Jordan Raney DF
- 8 Ryann Neushul AK
- 9 Jewel Roemer AK
- 10 Emma Lineback AK
- 11 Emily Ausmus AK
- 12 Lucy Haaland-Ford DF
- 13 Christine Carpenter GK
- 14 Rachel Gazzaniga C
- 15 Paige Hauschild AK

=== Former squads ===
==== Olympic Games ====
- 2000 – Bernice Orwig (GK), Heather Petri, Ericka Lorenz, Brenda Villa, Ellen Estes, Coralie Simmons, Maureen O'Toole, Julie Swail (Captain), Heather Moody, Robin Beauregard, Nicolle Payne (GK), Kathy Sheehy, Courtney Johnson. Head Coach: Guy Baker.
- 2004 – Jackie Frank (GK), Heather Petri, Ericka Lorenz, Brenda Villa, Ellen Estes, Natalie Golda, Margaret Dingeldein, Kelly Rulon, Heather Moody (Captain), Robin Beauregard, Amber Stachowski, Nicolle Payne (GK), Thalia Munro. Head Coach: Guy Baker.
- 2008 – Betsey Armstrong (GK), Heather Petri, Brittany Hayes, Brenda Villa (Captain), Lauren Wenger, Natalie Golda, Patty Cardenas, Jessica Steffens, Elsie Windes, Alison Gregorka, Moriah van Norman, Kami Craig, Jaime Hipp (GK). Head Coach: Guy Baker.
- 2012 – Betsey Armstrong (GK), Heather Petri, Melissa Seidemann, Brenda Villa (Captain), Lauren Wenger, Maggie Steffens, Courtney Mathewson, Jessica Steffens, Elsie Windes, Kelly Rulon, Annika Dries, Kami Craig, Tumua Anae (GK). Head Coach: Adam Krikorian.
- 2016 – Sami Hill (GK), Maddie Musselman, Melissa Seidemann, Rachel Fattal, Caroline Clark, Maggie Steffens (Captain), Courtney Mathewson, Kiley Neushul, Aria Fischer, Kaleigh Gilchrist, Makenzie Fischer, Kami Craig, Ashleigh Johnson (GK). Head Coach: Adam Krikorian.
- 2020 – Ashleigh Johnson (GK), Maddie Musselman, Melissa Seidemann, Rachel Fattal, Paige Hauschild, Maggie Steffens (Captain), Stephania Haralabidis, Jamie Neushul, Aria Fischer, Kaleigh Gilchrist, Makenzie Fischer, Alys Williams, Amanda Longan (GK). Head Coach: Adam Krikorian.
- 2024 – Ashleigh Johnson (GK), Maddie Musselman, Tara Prentice, Rachel Fattal, Jenna Flynn, Maggie Steffens (Captain), Jordan Raney, Ryann Neushul, Jewel Roemer, Kaleigh Gilchrist, Emily Ausmus, Jovana Sekulic, Amanda Longan (GK). Head Coach: Adam Krikorian.

==== World Aquatics Championships ====
- 2003 – Nicolle Payne (GK), Heather Petri, Ericka Lorenz, Brenda Villa, Ellen Estes, Natalie Golda, Margaret Dingeldein, Jackie Frank (GK), Heather Moody (Captain), Robin Beauregard, Amber Stachowski, Gabrielle Domanic, Thalia Munro. Head Coach: Guy Baker.
- 2005 – Emily Feher, Heather Petri, Ericka Lorenz, Brenda Villa (Captain), Lauren Wenger, Natalie Golda, Kristina Kunkel, Erika Figge, Jamie Hipp, Kelly Rulon, Moriah Van Norman, Drue Wawrzynski, Thalia Munro. Head Coach: Heather Moody
- 2007 – Betsey Armstrong (GK), Heather Petri, Ericka Lorenz, Brenda Villa (Captain), Lauren Wenger, Natalie Golda, Patricia Cardenas, Brittany Hayes, Elsie Windes, Alison Gregorka, Moriah van Norman, Kami Craig, Jaime Hipp (GK). Head Coach: Guy Baker.
- 2009 – Betsey Armstrong (GK), Heather Petri, Brittany Hayes, Brenda Villa (Captain), Lauren Wenger, Tanya Gandy, Kelly Rulon, Jessica Steffens, Elsie Windes, Alison Gregorka, Moriah van Norman, Kami Craig, Jaime Hipp (GK). Head Coach: Adam Krikorian.
- 2011 – Betsey Armstrong (GK), Heather Petri, Melissa Seidemann, Brenda Villa (Captain), Lauren Wenger, Maggie Steffens, Courtney Mathewson, Jessica Steffens, Elsie Windes, Kelly Rulon, Annika Dries, Kami Craig, Tumua Anae (GK). Head Coach: Adam Krikorian.
- 2013 – Betsey Armstrong (GK), Lauren Silver, Melissa Seidemann, Rachel Fattal, Caroline Clark, Maggie Steffens, Courtney Mathewson (Captain), Kiley Neushul, Jillian Kraus, Kelly Rulon, Annika Dries, Kami Craig, Tumua Anae (GK). Head Coach: Adam Krikorian.
- 2015 – Sami Hill (GK), Maddie Musselman, Melissa Seidemann, Rachel Fattal, Alys Williams, Maggie Steffens (Captain), Courtney Mathewson, Kiley Neushul, Ashley Grossman, Kaleigh Gilchrist, Makenzie Fischer, Kami Craig, Ashleigh Johnson (GK). Head Coach: Adam Krikorian.
- 2017 – Gabby Stone (GK), Maddie Musselman, Melissa Seidemann, Rachel Fattal, Paige Hauschild, Maggie Steffens (Captain), Jordan Raney, Kiley Neushul, Aria Fischer, Jamie Neushul, Makenzie Fischer, Alys Williams, Amanda Longan (GK). Head Coach: Adam Krikorian.
- 2019 – Amanda Longan (GK), Maddie Musselman, Melissa Seidemann, Rachel Fattal, Paige Hauschild, Maggie Steffens (Captain), Stephania Haralabidis, Kiley Neushul, Aria Fischer, Kaleigh Gilchrist, Makenzie Fischer, Alys Williams, Ashleigh Johnson (GK). Head Coach: Adam Krikorian.
- 2022 – Ashleigh Johnson (GK), Maddie Musselman, Tara Prentice, Rachel Fattal, Ava Elizabeth Johnson, Maggie Steffens, Stephania Haralabidis, Ryann Neushul, Denise Mammolito, Kaleigh Gilchrist, Bayley Weber, Jordan Raney, Amanda Longan (GK). Head Coach: Adam Krikorian.
- 2024 – Ashleigh Johnson (GK), Maddie Musselman, Tara Prentice, Rachel Fattal, Jenna Flynn, Maggie Steffens, Jordan Raney, Ryann Neushul, Jewel Roemer, Emily Ausmus, Amanda Longan (GK), Jovana Sekulic, Denise Mammolito. Head Coach: Adam Krikorian.
- 2025 – Amanda Longan (GK), Ava Stryker, Tara Prentice, Anna Pearson, Jenna Flynn, Julia Bonaguidi, Jovana Sekulic, Ryann Neushul, Jewel Roemer, Emma Lineback, Emily Ausmus, Ella Woodhead, Isabel Williams (GK), Rachel Gazzaniga, Malia Allen. Head coach: Adam Krikorian.

==== World Cup ====
- 1979 FINA World Cup – Lynn Comer, Laura Cox, Dion Dickinson, Vaune Kadlubek, Debby Kemp, Simone LaPay, Marsha McCuen-Kavanaugh, Sue McIntyre, Maureen O'Toole, Sallie Thomas, and Lyn Taylor.
- 1981 FINA World Cup – Lynn Comer, Laura Cox, Ruth Cox, Debbie Decker, Leslie Entwistle, Karen Hastie, Vaune Kadlubek, Simone LaPay, Robin Linn, Sue McIntyre, Maureen O'Toole, Marla Smith
- 2026 – Amanda Longan, Ava Stryker, Tara Prentice, Rachel Fattal, Jenna Flynn, Ella Woodhead, Jordan Raney, Ryann Neushul, Jewel Roemer, Emma Lineback, Emily Ausmus, Lucy Haaland-Ford, Christine Carpenter, Rachel Gazzaniga, Paige Hauschild. Head coach: Adam Krikorian

==== World League ====
- 2004 FINA World League – Robin Beauregard, Margaret Dingeldein, Ellen Estes, Jacqueline Frank, Natalie Golda, Ericka Lorenz, Heather Moody, Thalia Munro, Nicolle Payne (GK), Heather Petri, Kelly Rulon, Amber Stachowski, and Brenda Villa. Head Coach: Guy Baker.
- 2005 FINA World League – Katherine Hansen, Erika Figge, Natalie Golda, Brittany Hayes, Jaime Hipp (GK), Kristina Kunkel, Ericka Lorenz, Heather Petri, Aimee Stachowski, Moriah van Norman, Brenda Villa, Drue Wawrzynski, and Lauren Wenger. Head Coach: Heather Moody.
- 2006 FINA World League – Elizabeth Armstrong, Patricia Cardenas, Kami Craig, Erika Figge, Natalie Golda, Alison Gregorka, Ericka Lorenz, Heather Petri, Jessica Steffens, Moriah van Norman, Brenda Villa, Lauren Wenger, and Elsie Windes. Head Coach: Guy Baker.
- 2007 FINA World League – Elizabeth Armstrong, Patricia Cardenas, Kami Craig, Erika Figge, Natalie Golda, Alison Gregorka, Jaime Hipp (GK), Heather Petri, Jessica Steffens, Moriah van Norman, Brenda Villa, Lauren Wenger, and Elsie Windes. Head Coach: Guy Baker.

==== Pan American Games ====
- 2007 – Betsey Armstrong (GK), Patricia Cardenas, Kami Craig, Erika Figge, Natalie Golda, Alison Gregorka, Jaime Hipp (GK), Heather Petri, Jessica Steffens, Moriah van Norman, Brenda Villa (Captain), Lauren Wenger, Elsie Windes. Head Coach: Guy Baker.
- 2011 – Betsey Armstromg, Heather Petri, Melissa Seidemann, Brenda Villa (Captain), Lauren Wenger, Maggie Steffens, Courtney Mathewson, Jessica Steffens, Elsie Windes, Kelly Rulon, Annika Dries, Kami Craig, Tumua Anae (GK). Head Coach: Adam Krikorian
- 2015 – Sami Hill (GK), Maddie Musselman, Melissa Seidemann, Rachel Fattal, Caroline Clark, Maggie Steffens (Captain), Courtney Mathewson, Kiley Neushul, Ashley Grossman, Kaleigh Gilchrist, Makenzie Fischer, Kami Craig, Ashleigh Johnson (GK). Head Coach: Adam Krikorian
- 2019 – Ashleigh Johnson (GK), Maddie Musselman, Melissa Seidemann, Rachel Fattal, Stephania Haralabidis, Maggie Steffens (Captain), Jamie Neushul, Kiley Neushul, Aria Fischer, Alys Williams, Makenzie Fischer. Head Coach: Adam Krikorian
- 2023 – Ashleigh Johnson (GK), Emily Ausmus, Tara Prentice, Rachel Fattal, Jenna Flynn, Maggie Steffens, Jordan Raney, Ryann Neushul, Jewel Roemer, Kaleigh Gilchrist, Ava Johnson, Bayley Weber, Amanda Longan. Head Coach: Adam Krikorian

==== Other tournaments ====
- 1981 World Games – Lynn Comer, Laura Cox, Ruth Cox, Debbie Decker, Leslie Entwistle, Karen Hastie, Vaune Kadlubek, Simone LaPay, Robin Linn, Sue McIntyre, Maureen O'Toole, Marla Smith

== Statistics ==
=== Olympic Games ===
Abbreviations
Rk.	Rank	Pos.	Playing position	App.	Appearances
Ref.	References	A	Attacker	C	Center
D	Defender	GK	Goalkeeper	U	Utility

==== Age records ====
Top 10 youngest Olympians (Olympic medalists)
Rk.	Player	Pos.	Birthdate	Game	Age of first app.	Ref.
1	Aria Fischer	C	March 2, 1999	2016 (gold)	17 years, 160 days	
2	Maddie Musselman	A	June 16, 1998	2016 (gold)	18 years, 54 days	
3	Maggie Steffens	A/D	June 4, 1993	2012 (gold)	19 years, 56 days	
4	Makenzie Fischer	D	March 29, 1997	2016 (gold)	19 years, 133 days	
5	Ericka Lorenz	A	February 18, 1981	2000 (silver)	19 years, 211 days	
6	Kelly Rulon	A	August 16, 1984	2004 (bronze)	20 years, 0 days	
7	Brenda Villa	A	April 18, 1980	2000 (silver)	20 years, 151 days	
8	Annika Dries	C	February 10, 1992	2012 (gold)	20 years, 171 days	
9	Kami Craig	C	July 21, 1987	2008 (silver)	21 years, 21 days	
10	Jessica Steffens	D	April 7, 1987	2008 (silver)	21 years, 126 days	

Top 10 oldest Olympians (Olympic medalists)
Rk.	Player	Pos.	Birthdate	Game	Age of last app.	Ref.
1	Maureen O'Toole		March 24, 1961	2000 (silver)	39 years, 183 days	
2	Heather Petri	A	June 13, 1978	2012 (gold)	34 years, 57 days	
3	Brenda Villa	A	April 18, 1980	2012 (gold)	32 years, 113 days	
4	Heather Moody	C	August 21, 1973	2004 (bronze)	31 years, 5 days	
5	Kathy Sheehy		April 26, 1970	2000 (silver)	30 years, 150 days	
6	Courtney Mathewson	A	September 14, 1986	2016 (gold)	29 years, 340 days	
7	Betsey Armstrong	GK	January 31, 1983	2012 (gold)	29 years, 191 days	
8	Kami Craig	C	July 21, 1987	2016 (gold)	29 years, 29 days	
9	Lauren Wenger	U	March 11, 1984	2012 (gold)	28 years, 151 days	
10	Kelly Rulon	A	August 16, 1984	2012 (gold)	27 years, 359 days	

==== Most appearances ====
The following tables are pre-sorted by number of appearances, date of last appearance, date of birth, respectively.

Three athletes have each made at least three Olympic appearances. Heather Petri and Brenda Villa are the only two American female water polo players to have competed in four Olympic Games.

App.	Name	Pos.	Birthdate	Games as player	Period	Age of first app.	Age of last app.	Ref.
4	Heather Petri	A	June 13, 1978	2000 (silver) , 2004 (bronze) , 2008 (silver) , 2012 (gold)	12 years	22 years, 95 days	34 years, 57 days	
4	Brenda Villa	A	April 18, 1980	2000 (silver) , 2004 (bronze) , 2008 (silver) , 2012 (gold)	12 years	20 years, 151 days	32 years, 113 days	
3	Kami Craig	C	July 21, 1987	2008 (silver) , 2012 (gold) , 2016 (gold)	8 years	21 years, 21 days	29 years, 29 days	

Two men have each made at least two Olympic appearances as head coaches of the United States women's national team.

App.	Name	Birthdate	Games as head coach	Period	Age of first app.	Age of last app.	Ref.
3	Guy Baker		2000 (silver) , 2004 (bronze) , 2008 (silver)	8 years			
2	Adam Krikorian	July 22, 1974	2012 (gold) , 2016 (gold)	4 years	38 years, 8 days	42 years, 28 days	

==== Leading scorers ====
The following tables are pre-sorted by number of goals, date of the game (match), name of the player, respectively.

Maggie Steffens is the American female water polo player with the most goals at the Olympic Games, scoring 38.

Players with at least 12 goals at the Olympic Games
Rk.	Player	Pos.	Games (goals)	Total goals	Matches played	Goals per match	Ref.
1	Maggie Steffens	A/D	2012 (21) (gold) , 2016 (17) (gold)	38	12	3.166	
2	Brenda Villa	A	2000 (9) (silver) , 2004 (7) (bronze) , 2008 (9) (silver) , 2012 (6) (gold)	31	23	1.347	
3	Kami Craig	C	2008 (6) (silver) , 2012 (6) (gold) , 2016 (5) (gold)	17	17	1.000	
4	Courtney Mathewson	A	2012 (7) (gold) , 2016 (7) (gold)	14	12	1.166	
5	Maddie Musselman	A	2016 (12) (gold)	12	6	2.000	

Players with at least 8 goals in an Olympic tournament
Rk.	Player	Pos.	Game	Goals	Matches played	Goals per match	Ref.
1	Maggie Steffens	D	2012 (gold)	21	6	3.500	
2	Maggie Steffens	A	2016 (gold)	17	6	2.833	
3	Maddie Musselman	A	2016 (gold)	12	6	2.000	
4	Kiley Neushul	A	2016 (gold)	10	6	1.666	
5	Coralie Simmons		2000 (silver)	9	7	1.285	
5	Brenda Villa	A	2000 (silver)	9	7	1.285	
5	Natalie Golda	D	2008 (silver)	9	5	2.250	
5	Brenda Villa	A	2008 (silver)	9	5	2.250	
9	Brittany Hayes	A	2008 (silver)	8	5	1.600	

Players with at least 4 goals in an Olympic match
Rk.	Player	Pos.	Goals	Date	Match	Game	Ref.
1	Maggie Steffens	D	7	July 30, 2012	United States 14–13 Hungary	2012 (gold)	
2	Maggie Steffens	D	5	August 9, 2012	United States 8–5 Spain	2012 (gold)	
3	Brenda Villa	A	4	September 20, 2000	United States 9–6 Kazakhstan	2000 (silver)	
3	Brenda Villa	A	4	August 16, 2004	United States 7–6 Hungary	2004 (bronze)	
3	Natalie Golda	D	4	August 11, 2008	United States 12–11 China	2008 (silver)	
3	Courtney Mathewson	A	4	July 30, 2012	United States 14–13 Hungary	2012 (gold)	
3	Kami Craig	C	4	August 1, 2012	United States 9–9 Spain	2012 (gold)	
3	Maggie Steffens	D	4	August 7, 2012	United States 11–9 Australia	2012 (gold)	
3	Maddie Musselman	A	4	August 11, 2016	United States 12–4 China	2016 (gold)	
3	Maggie Steffens	A	4	August 11, 2016	United States 12–4 China	2016 (gold)	
3	Maggie Steffens	A	4	August 13, 2016	United States 11–6 Hungary	2016 (gold)	
3	Maggie Steffens	A	4	August 17, 2016	United States 14–10 Hungary	2016 (gold)	

==== Multiple medalists ====
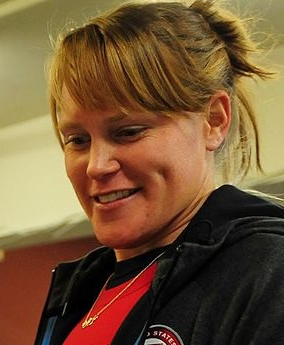
Heather Petri

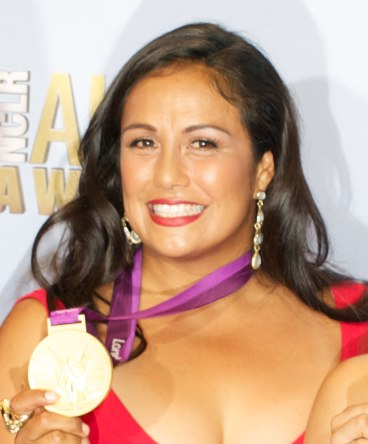
Brenda Villa

Seventeen athletes have each won at least two Olympic medals in water polo. Heather Petri and Brenda Villa are the only two American female water polo players to have won four Olympic medals.

Rk.	Name	Pos.	Games as player	Medals				Ref.
Rk.	Name	Pos.	Games as player	Gold	Silver	Bronze	Total	Ref.
1	Heather Petri	A	2000 (silver) , 2004 (bronze) , 2008 (silver) , 2012 (gold)	1	2	1	4	
1	Brenda Villa	A	2000 (silver) , 2004 (bronze) , 2008 (silver) , 2012 (gold)	1	2	1	4	
3	Kami Craig	C	2008 (silver) , 2012 (gold) , 2016 (gold)	2	1	0	3	
4	Courtney Mathewson	A	2012 (gold) , 2016 (gold)	2	0	0	2	
4	Melissa Seidemann	D	2012 (gold) , 2016 (gold)	2	0	0	2	
4	Maggie Steffens	A/D	2012 (gold) , 2016 (gold)	2	0	0	2	
7	Betsey Armstrong	GK	2008 (silver) , 2012 (gold)	1	1	0	2	
7	Jessica Steffens	D	2008 (silver) , 2012 (gold)	1	1	0	2	
7	Lauren Wenger	U	2008 (silver) , 2012 (gold)	1	1	0	2	
7	Elsie Windes	D	2008 (silver) , 2012 (gold)	1	1	0	2	
11	Kelly Rulon	A	2004 (bronze) , 2012 (gold)	1	0	1	2	
12	Robin Beauregard	C	2000 (silver) , 2004 (bronze)	0	1	1	2	
12	Ellen Estes		2000 (silver) , 2004 (bronze)	0	1	1	2	
12	Natalie Golda	D	2004 (bronze) , 2008 (silver)	0	1	1	2	
12	Ericka Lorenz	A	2000 (silver) , 2004 (bronze)	0	1	1	2	
12	Heather Moody	C	2000 (silver) , 2004 (bronze)	0	1	1	2	
12	Nicolle Payne	GK	2000 (silver) , 2004 (bronze)	0	1	1	2	

Two men have each led teams to at least three Olympic medals as head coaches of the United States women's national team.

Rk.	Name	Games as head coach	Medals				Ref.
Rk.	Name	Games as head coach	Gold	Silver	Bronze	Total	Ref.
1	Guy Baker	2000 (silver) , 2004 (bronze) , 2008 (silver)	0	2	1	3	
2	Adam Krikorian	2012 (gold) , 2016 (gold) , 2020 (gold)	3	0	0	3	

== See also ==
- United States women's Olympic water polo team records and statistics
- United States men's national water polo team
- USA Water Polo
- USA Water Polo Hall of Fame
- List of Olympic champions in women's water polo
- List of women's Olympic water polo tournament records and statistics
- List of world champions in women's water polo
