= 2018 FINA Women's Water Polo World Cup =

Tournament details
- Host country: Russia
- Venue: 1 (in 1 host city)
- Dates: 4–9 September 2018
- Teams: 8 (from 4 confederations)

Final positions
- Champions: United States (4th title)
- Runners-up: Russia
- Third place: Australia
- Fourth place: Spain

Tournament statistics
- Matches played: 24
- Goals scored: 479 (19.96 per match)
- Top scorer(s): (Spain) Anni Espar (19 goals)

Awards
- Best player: (United States) Maggie Steffens

The 2018 FINA Women's Water Polo World Cup was the 17th edition of the event, organised by the world's governing body in aquatics, the International Swimming Federation (FINA). The event took place in Surgut, Russia from 4 to 9 September 2018.

The United States won the gold medal, after defeating Russia 8-5 in the final. Australia captured bronze, beating Spain 9-8.

== Format ==
8 teams qualified for the 2018 FINA World Cup. They are split into two groups of 4 teams. After playing a round-robin every team advanced to the quarterfinals. The best ranked team of Group A played against the fourth ranked team of Group B, the second ranked team of Group A against the third ranked team of Group B the third ranked team of Group A against the second ranked team of Group B and the fourth ranked team of Group A against the best ranked team of Group B. The winners of those quarterfinals advanced to the Semis and played out the champion while the losers of the quarterfinals competed in placement matches.

== Groups ==
| Group A | Group B |
|---|---|
| Spain; Australia; China; Russia | South Africa; New Zealand; United States; Canada |

== Preliminary round ==
=== Group A ===
All times are YEKT (UTC+5)

| | Team | G | W | D | L | GF | GA | Diff | Points |
|---|---|---|---|---|---|---|---|---|---|
| 1. | Russia | 3 | 3 | 0 | 0 | 46 | 28 | +18 | 6 |
| 2. | Spain | 3 | 1 | 1 | 1 | 30 | 28 | +2 | 3 |
| 3. | Australia | 3 | 1 | 1 | 1 | 27 | 30 | -3 | 3 |
| 4. | China | 3 | 0 | 0 | 3 | 26 | 43 | −17 | 0 |

| 4 September 2018; 16:00 | Australia | 11–8 | China |
| 4 September 2018; 16:00 | Score by quarters: 2-0, 3-3, 2-4, 4-1 |

| 4 September 2018; 19:00 | Spain | 9–13 | Russia |
| 4 September 2018; 19:00 | Score by quarters: 2-4, 3-2, 4-2, 0-5 |

| 5 September 2018; 15:00 | Spain | 13–7 | China |
| 5 September 2018; 15:00 | Score by quarters: 2-2, 4-2, 4-2, 3-1 |

| 5 September 2018; 19:30 | Australia | 8–14 | Russia |
| 5 September 2018; 19:30 | Score by quarters: 2-0, 3-7, 0-5, 3-2 |

| 6 September 2018; 16:30 | Australia | 8–8 | Spain |
| 6 September 2018; 16:30 | Score by quarters: 2-1, 4-3, 1-3, 1-1 |

| 6 September 2018; 19:30 | China | 11–19 | Russia |
| 6 September 2018; 19:30 | Score by quarters: 3-5, 3-5, 2-6, 3-3 |

=== Group B ===
All times are YEKT (UTC+5)

| | Team | G | W | D | L | GF | GA | Diff | Points |
|---|---|---|---|---|---|---|---|---|---|
| 1. | United States | 3 | 3 | 0 | 0 | 61 | 6 | +55 | 6 |
| 2. | Canada | 3 | 2 | 0 | 1 | 30 | 24 | +6 | 4 |
| 3. | New Zealand | 3 | 1 | 0 | 2 | 16 | 33 | -17 | 2 |
| 4. | South Africa | 3 | 0 | 0 | 3 | 8 | 52 | -44 | 0 |

| 4 September 2018; 14:30 | New Zealand | 2–18 | United States |
| 4 September 2018; 14:30 | Score by quarters: 1-5, 1-3, 0-6, 0-4 |

| 4 September 2018; 17:30 | South Africa | 3–18 | Canada |
| 4 September 2018; 17:30 | Score by quarters: 1-3, 0-5, 1-5, 1-5 |

| 5 September 2018; 16:30 | New Zealand | 4–11 | Canada |
| 5 September 2018; 16:30 | Score by quarters: 1-1, 2-3, 0-4, 1-3 |

| 5 September 2018; 18:00 | South Africa | 1–26 | United States |
| 5 September 2018; 18:00 | Score by quarters: 1-7, 0-10, 0-4, 0-5 |

| 6 September 2018; 15:00 | New Zealand | 10–4 | South Africa |
| 6 September 2018; 15:00 | Score by quarters: 2-2, 3-0, 2-1, 3-1 |

| 6 September 2018; 18:00 | United States | 17–3 | Canada |
| 6 September 2018; 18:00 | Score by quarters: 2-0, 2-1, 9-2, 4-0 |

== Final round ==
5th-8th place bracket

5th–8th place classification
08 September – Surgut
New Zealand | 6
China | 15
08 September– Surgut
Canada | 21
South Africa | 2

5th-place match
09 September – Surgut
China | 20
Canada | 19
7th-place match
09 September – Surgut
New Zealand | 14
South Africa | 3

=== 5th–8th place classification ===
All times are YEKT (UTC+5)

| 8 September 2018; 15:00 | New Zealand | 6–15 | China |
| 8 September 2018; 15:00 | Score by quarters: 1-4, 1-4, 2-3, 2-4 |

| 8 September 2018; 16:30 | Canada | 21–2 | South Africa |
| 8 September 2018; 16:30 | Score by quarters: 2-2, 6-0, 6-0, 7-0 |

=== 7th-place match ===
All times are YEKT (UTC+5)

| 9 September 2018; 15:00 | New Zealand | 14–3 | South Africa |
| 9 September 2018; 15:00 | Score by quarters: 3-0, 1-0, 5-1, 5-2 |

=== 5th-place match ===
All times are YEKT (UTC+5)

| 9 September 2018; 16:30 | China | 20–19 (PSO) | Canada |
| 9 September 2018; 16:30 | Score by quarters: 3-1, 4-3, 3-4, 0-2 PSO: 10-9 |

Championship bracket

Quarter-finals
07 September – Surgut
Russia | 26
South Africa | 0
07 September – Surgut
Australia | 9
Canada | 6
07 September – Surgut
China | 5
United States | 15
07 September – Surgut
Spain | 17
New Zealand | 3

Semi-finals
08 September – Surgut
Australia | 3
Russia | 5
08 September – Surgut
Spain | 5
United States | 11

Final
09 September – Surgut
United States | 8
Russia | 5
Third place
09 September – Surgut
Spain | 8
Australia | 9

=== Quarterfinals ===
All times are YEKT (UTC+5)

| 7 September 2018; 15:00 | Spain | 17–3 | New Zealand |
| 7 September 2018; 15:00 | Score by quarters: 3-1, 5-1, 4-0, 5-1 |

| 7 September 2018; 16:30 | Australia | 9–6 | Canada |
| 7 September 2018; 16:30 | Score by quarters: 3-1, 1-1, 2-2, 3-2 |

| 7 September 2018; 18:00 | China | 5–15 | United States |
| 7 September 2018; 18:00 | Score by quarters: 0-4, 4-4, 0-3, 1-4 |

| 7 September 2018; 19:30 | Russia | 26–0 | South Africa |
| 7 September 2018; 19:30 | Score by quarters: 9-0, 4-0, 8-0, 5-0 |

=== Semifinals ===
All times are YEKT (UTC+5)

| 8 September 2018; 18:00 | Spain | 5–11 | United States |
| 8 September 2018; 18:00 | Score by quarters: 0-3, 3-4, 1-2, 1-2 |

| 8 September 2018; 19:30 | Australia | 3–5 | Russia |
| 8 September 2018; 19:30 | Score by quarters: 2-1, 0-2, 0-1, 1-1 |

=== Bronze-medal match ===
All times are YEKT (UTC+5)

| 9 September 2018; 18:00 | Spain | 8–9 | Australia |
| 9 September 2018; 18:00 | Score by quarters: 0-2, 4-2, 2-3, 2-2 |
| 9 September 2018; 18:00 | A. Espar 4 Lloret, Gual, Crespí, Leitón 1 | Goals | Webster 5 Knox 2 Gofers, Buckling 1 |

=== Gold-medal match ===
All times are YEKT (UTC+5)

| 9 September 2018; 19:30 | United States | 8–5 | Russia |
| 9 September 2018; 19:30 | Score by quarters: 2-1, 3-1, 2-1, 1-2 |
| 9 September 2018; 19:30 | Steffens 3 J. Neushul 2 Hauschild, A. Fischer, M. Fischer 1 | Goals | Gorbunova 2 Ivanova, Bersneva, Zubkova 1 |

== Final standings ==
| RANK | TEAM |
|---|---|
| | United States |
| | Russia |
| | Australia |
| 4. | Spain |
| 5. | China |
| 6. | Canada |
| 7. | New Zealand |
| 8. | South Africa |

2018 Women's FINA Water Polo World Cup

United States
Fourth title

Team Roster

Ashleigh Johnson, Jordan Raney, Stephania Haralabidis, Rachel Fattal, Paige Hauschild, Maggie Steffens (C), Jamie Neushul, Kiley Neushul, Aria Fischer, Kaleigh Gilchrist, Makenzie Fischer, Alys Williams, Amanda Longan. Head coach: Adam Krikorian.

== Individual awards ==
- Most Valuable Player
  - Maggie Steffens (USA)
- Best Goalkeeper
  - Ashleigh Johnson (USA)
- Best Scorer
  - Anni Espar (ESP) — 19 goals
