= 2017 FINA Women's Water Polo World League =

- League: FINA Water Polo World League
- Sport: Water Polo
- Duration: 22 November 2016 to 11 June 2017

Super Final
- Finals champions: United States (11th title)
- Runners-up: Canada

FINA Women's Water Polo World League seasons
- ← 2016 2018 →

The 2017 FINA Women's Water Polo World League is the 14th edition of the annual women's international water polo tournament. It was played between November 2016 and June 2017 and open to all women's water polo national teams. After participating in a preliminary round, eight teams qualify to play in a final tournament, called the Super Final from 06 to 11 June 2017.

In the world league, there are specific rules that do not allow matches to end in a draw. If teams are level at the end of the 4th quarter of any world league match, the match will be decided by a penalty shootout. Teams earn points in the standings in group matches as follows:

- Match won in normal time - 3 points
- Match won in shootout - 2 points
- Match lost in shootout - 1 point
- Match lost in normal time - 0 points

== Europe ==
=== Preliminary round ===
The European preliminary round consisted of two groups of three teams. The winner of each group after the home and away series of games qualifies for the Super Final. A third place is taken by the best scoring second-placed team.

==== Group A ====
Pos	Team	Pld	W	OTW	OTL	L	GF	GA	GD	Pts	Qualification	Russia	Netherlands	Greece
1	Russia	4	2	0	1	1	52	41	+11	7	Super Final	—	10–10^{(3–5 PSO)}	20–11
2	Netherlands	4	1	2	0	1	36	38	−2	7	Super Final	12–15	—	10–9
3	Greece	4	1	0	1	2	32	41	−9	4		8–7	4–4^{(1–3 PSO)}	—

Source: FINA

==== Group B ====
Pos	Team	Pld	W	OTW	OTL	L	GF	GA	GD	Pts	Qualification	Hungary	Italy	France
1	Hungary	4	3	1	0	0	53	30	+23	11	Super Final	—	10–10^{(3–1 PSO)}	15–4
2	Italy	4	2	0	1	1	50	31	+19	7		10–12	—	14–4
3	France	4	0	0	0	4	19	61	−42	0		6–16	5–16	—

Source: FINA

== Intercontinental Water Polo Tournament ==
May 2–7, 2017 Schaal Aquatics Center, Davis, United States

=== Group stage ===
Pos	Team	Pld	W	OTW	OTL	L	GF	GA	GD	Pts	Qualification	United States	Australia	Japan	Canada	Kazakhstan	People's Republic of China
1	United States (H)	5	4	1	0	0	43	28	+15	14	Super Final	—	—	—	—	12–7	—
2	Australia	5	4	0	1	0	45	26	+19	13	Super Final	5–5^{(2–4 PSO)}	—		—	9–5	13–6
3	Japan	5	3	0	0	2	48	36	+12	9	Super Final	6–10	3–8	—	13–8	—	—
4	Canada	5	2	0	0	3	40	41	−1	6	Super Final	5–6	7–10	—	—	—	—
5	Kazakhstan	5	1	0	0	4	28	51	−23	3		—	—	4–15	3–8	—	9–7
6	China	5	0	0	0	5	33	55	−22	0	Host Super Final	5–10	—	6–11	9–12	—	—

Source: FINA
(H) Host

=== Final stage ===
==== 5th Place ====
7 May 2017; 9:30	Kazakhstan	14–7	China	Schaal Aquatics Center, Davis, United States; Referees: Andrew Carney (AUS), Haz Ortega (USA)
7 May 2017; 9:30	Score by quarters: 2–2, 3–1, 5–2, 4–2			Schaal Aquatics Center, Davis, United States; Referees: Andrew Carney (AUS), Haz Ortega (USA)
7 May 2017; 9:30	Mirshina 3	Goals	three players 2	Schaal Aquatics Center, Davis, United States; Referees: Andrew Carney (AUS), Haz Ortega (USA)

==== 3rd Place ====
7 May 2017; 11:00	Japan	2–5	Canada	Schaal Aquatics Center, Davis, United States; Referees: Steven Rotsart (USA), Victor Salnicenko (KAZ)
7 May 2017; 11:00	Score by quarters: 1–2, 1–0, 0–1, 0–2			Schaal Aquatics Center, Davis, United States; Referees: Steven Rotsart (USA), Victor Salnicenko (KAZ)
7 May 2017; 11:00	Arima, Noro 1	Goals	Lemay 3	Schaal Aquatics Center, Davis, United States; Referees: Steven Rotsart (USA), Victor Salnicenko (KAZ)

==== Final ====
7 May 2017; 12:30	United States	7–10	Australia	Schaal Aquatics Center, Davis, United States; Referees: Martin Murray (CAN), Tadao Tahara (JPN)
7 May 2017; 12:30	Score by quarters: 0–2, 2–1, 1–3, 4–4			Schaal Aquatics Center, Davis, United States; Referees: Martin Murray (CAN), Tadao Tahara (JPN)
7 May 2017; 12:30	three players 2	Goals	Armit 4	Schaal Aquatics Center, Davis, United States; Referees: Martin Murray (CAN), Tadao Tahara (JPN)

== Super Final ==
June 6–11, 2017, Shanghai Oriental Sports Center, Shanghai, China
In the Super Final the eight qualifying teams are split into two groups of four teams with all teams progressing to the knock-out stage.

=== Qualified teams ===
Africa	Americas	Asia	Europe	Oceania
—	Canada; United States	China (Host); Japan	Hungary; Netherlands; Russia	Australia

=== Group A ===
All times are CST (UTC+8)

Pos	Team	Pld	W	OTW	OTL	L	GF	GA	GD	Pts	Qualification
1	United States	3	3	0	0	0	36	20	+16	9	Quarterfinals
2	Russia	3	1	1	0	1	40	32	+8	5	Quarterfinals
3	Netherlands	3	1	0	1	1	33	24	+9	4	Quarterfinals
4	Japan	3	0	0	0	3	21	54	−33	0	Quarterfinals

Source: FINA

6 June 2017; 16:20	Russia	18–9	Japan	Shanghai Oriental Sports Center, Shanghai, China; Referees: Liang Zhang (CHN), Marcela Mauss (GER)
6 June 2017; 16:20	Score by quarters: 5–1, 5–2, 3–3, 5–3			Shanghai Oriental Sports Center, Shanghai, China; Referees: Liang Zhang (CHN), Marcela Mauss (GER)
6 June 2017; 16:20	Simanovich 5	Goals	Inaba 3	Shanghai Oriental Sports Center, Shanghai, China; Referees: Liang Zhang (CHN), Marcela Mauss (GER)

6 June 2017; 17:40	United States	6–4	Netherlands	Shanghai Oriental Sports Center, Shanghai, China; Referees: Filippo Gomez (ITA), Marie-Claude Deslieres (CAN)
6 June 2017; 17:40	Score by quarters: 3–0, 1–2, 2–2, 0–0			Shanghai Oriental Sports Center, Shanghai, China; Referees: Filippo Gomez (ITA), Marie-Claude Deslieres (CAN)
6 June 2017; 17:40	K. Neushul 3	Goals	D. Genee 2	Shanghai Oriental Sports Center, Shanghai, China; Referees: Filippo Gomez (ITA), Marie-Claude Deslieres (CAN)

7 June 2017; 15:00	United States	17–4	Japan	Shanghai Oriental Sports Center, Shanghai, China; Referees: Nicola Johnson (AUS), Adil Aimbetov (KAZ)
7 June 2017; 15:00	Score by quarters: 4–1, 3–1, 6–1, 4–1			Shanghai Oriental Sports Center, Shanghai, China; Referees: Nicola Johnson (AUS), Adil Aimbetov (KAZ)
7 June 2017; 15:00	Williams 3	Goals	four players 4	Shanghai Oriental Sports Center, Shanghai, China; Referees: Nicola Johnson (AUS), Adil Aimbetov (KAZ)

7 June 2017; 16:20	Russia	10–10 (PSO)	Netherlands	Shanghai Oriental Sports Center, Shanghai, China; Referees: Marcela Mauss (GER), Rajmund Fodor (HUN)
7 June 2017; 16:20	Score by quarters: 3–4, 2–5, 2–1, 3–0 PSO: 4–2			Shanghai Oriental Sports Center, Shanghai, China; Referees: Marcela Mauss (GER), Rajmund Fodor (HUN)
7 June 2017; 16:20	Prokofyeva, Tolkunova 3	Goals	three players 3	Shanghai Oriental Sports Center, Shanghai, China; Referees: Marcela Mauss (GER), Rajmund Fodor (HUN)

8 June 2017; 16:20	Russia	12–13	United States	Shanghai Oriental Sports Center, Shanghai, China; Referees: Nicola Johnson (AUS), Filippo Gomez (ITA)
8 June 2017; 16:20	Score by quarters: 3–4, 5–6, 2–1, 2–2			Shanghai Oriental Sports Center, Shanghai, China; Referees: Nicola Johnson (AUS), Filippo Gomez (ITA)
8 June 2017; 16:20	Gorbunova 3	Goals	K. Neushul, M. Fischer 3	Shanghai Oriental Sports Center, Shanghai, China; Referees: Nicola Johnson (AUS), Filippo Gomez (ITA)

8 June 2017; 17:40	Japan	8–19	Netherlands	Shanghai Oriental Sports Center, Shanghai, China; Referees: Marie-Claude Deslieres (CAN), Liang Zhang (CHN)
8 June 2017; 17:40	Score by quarters: 3–5, 0–7, 3–3, 2–4			Shanghai Oriental Sports Center, Shanghai, China; Referees: Marie-Claude Deslieres (CAN), Liang Zhang (CHN)
8 June 2017; 17:40	Arima 4	Goals	S. van der Sloot 5	Shanghai Oriental Sports Center, Shanghai, China; Referees: Marie-Claude Deslieres (CAN), Liang Zhang (CHN)

=== Group B ===
All times are CST (UTC+8)

Pos	Team	Pld	W	OTW	OTL	L	GF	GA	GD	Pts	Qualification
1	Canada	3	2	1	0	0	27	20	+7	8	Quarterfinals
2	Hungary	3	2	0	1	0	33	18	+15	7	Quarterfinals
3	China (H)	3	1	0	0	2	27	36	−9	3	Quarterfinals
4	Australia	3	0	0	0	3	17	30	−13	0	Quarterfinals

Source: FINA
(H) Host

6 June 2017; 15:00	Hungary	9–9 (PSO)	Canada	Shanghai Oriental Sports Center, Shanghai, China; Referees: Svetlana Dreval (RUS), Martina Kunikova (SVK)
6 June 2017; 15:00	Score by quarters: 3–3, 1–2, 3–2, 2–2 PSO: 1–2			Shanghai Oriental Sports Center, Shanghai, China; Referees: Svetlana Dreval (RUS), Martina Kunikova (SVK)
6 June 2017; 15:00	Szilágyi 4	Goals	E. Wright, Christmas 3	Shanghai Oriental Sports Center, Shanghai, China; Referees: Svetlana Dreval (RUS), Martina Kunikova (SVK)

6 June 2017; 19:30	Australia	10–14	China	Shanghai Oriental Sports Center, Shanghai, China; Referees: Diana Dutilh (NED), Adil Aimbetov (KAZ)
6 June 2017; 19:30	Score by quarters: 3–4, 1–3, 3–3, 3–4			Shanghai Oriental Sports Center, Shanghai, China; Referees: Diana Dutilh (NED), Adil Aimbetov (KAZ)
6 June 2017; 19:30	Armit, Webster 4	Goals	Zhao 4	Shanghai Oriental Sports Center, Shanghai, China; Referees: Diana Dutilh (NED), Adil Aimbetov (KAZ)

7 June 2017; 17:40	Australia	4–8	Canada	Shanghai Oriental Sports Center, Shanghai, China; Referees: Diana Dutilh (NED), Filippo Gomez (ITA)
7 June 2017; 17:40	Score by quarters: 0–2, 3–2, 0–2, 1–2			Shanghai Oriental Sports Center, Shanghai, China; Referees: Diana Dutilh (NED), Filippo Gomez (ITA)
7 June 2017; 17:40	Webster 2	Goals	Eggens, Békhazi 2	Shanghai Oriental Sports Center, Shanghai, China; Referees: Diana Dutilh (NED), Filippo Gomez (ITA)

7 June 2017; 19:00	Hungary	16–6	China	Shanghai Oriental Sports Center, Shanghai, China; Referees: Amber Drury (USA), Tadao Tahara (JPN)
7 June 2017; 19:00	Score by quarters: 4–2, 4–0, 4–2, 4–2			Shanghai Oriental Sports Center, Shanghai, China; Referees: Amber Drury (USA), Tadao Tahara (JPN)
7 June 2017; 19:00	Szilágyi 6	Goals	Guo 3	Shanghai Oriental Sports Center, Shanghai, China; Referees: Amber Drury (USA), Tadao Tahara (JPN)

8 June 2017; 15:00	Hungary	8–3	Australia	Shanghai Oriental Sports Center, Shanghai, China; Referees: Martina Kunikova (SVK), Tadao Tahara (JPN)
8 June 2017; 15:00	Score by quarters: 3–1, 3–0, 0–2, 2–0			Shanghai Oriental Sports Center, Shanghai, China; Referees: Martina Kunikova (SVK), Tadao Tahara (JPN)
8 June 2017; 15:00	three players 2	Goals	three players 1	Shanghai Oriental Sports Center, Shanghai, China; Referees: Martina Kunikova (SVK), Tadao Tahara (JPN)

8 June 2017; 19:00	Canada	10–7	China	Shanghai Oriental Sports Center, Shanghai, China; Referees: Svetlana Dreval (RUS), Amber Drury (USA)
8 June 2017; 19:00	Score by quarters: 1–0, 4–4, 1–1, 4–2			Shanghai Oriental Sports Center, Shanghai, China; Referees: Svetlana Dreval (RUS), Amber Drury (USA)
8 June 2017; 19:00	E. Wright 3	Goals	Niu, Zhang C. 2	Shanghai Oriental Sports Center, Shanghai, China; Referees: Svetlana Dreval (RUS), Amber Drury (USA)

=== Knockout stage ===
Quarterfinals
09 June 2017
Russia	16
China	8
09 June 2017
Japan	5
Canada	9
09 June 2017
Netherlands	7
Hungary	8
09 June 2017
United States	13
Australia	4

Semifinals
10 June 2017
Russia	10
Canada	11
10 June 2017
Hungary	4
United States	8

Final
11 June 2017
Canada	6
United States	12
Third place
11 June 2017
Russia	9
Hungary	7

==== Quarterfinals ====
All times are CST (UTC+8)

9 June 2017; 15:00	Netherlands	7–8	Hungary	Shanghai Oriental Sports Center, Shanghai, China; Referees: Marie-Claude Deslieres (CAN), Amber Drury (USA)
9 June 2017; 15:00	Score by quarters: 3–3, 0–1, 1–2, 3–2			Shanghai Oriental Sports Center, Shanghai, China; Referees: Marie-Claude Deslieres (CAN), Amber Drury (USA)
9 June 2017; 15:00	Klaassen 3	Goals	Bujka 2	Shanghai Oriental Sports Center, Shanghai, China; Referees: Marie-Claude Deslieres (CAN), Amber Drury (USA)

9 June 2017; 16:20	United States	13–4	Australia	Shanghai Oriental Sports Center, Shanghai, China; Referees: Martina Kunikova (SVK), Rajmund Fodor (HUN)
9 June 2017; 16:20	Score by quarters: 3–1, 5–2, 3–1, 2–0			Shanghai Oriental Sports Center, Shanghai, China; Referees: Martina Kunikova (SVK), Rajmund Fodor (HUN)
9 June 2017; 16:20	K. Neushul 4	Goals	Halligan 2	Shanghai Oriental Sports Center, Shanghai, China; Referees: Martina Kunikova (SVK), Rajmund Fodor (HUN)

9 June 2017; 17:40	Japan	5–9	Canada	Shanghai Oriental Sports Center, Shanghai, China; Referees: Marcela Mauss (GER), Adil Aimbetov (KAZ)
9 June 2017; 17:40	Score by quarters: 3–1, 2–4, 0–2, 0–2			Shanghai Oriental Sports Center, Shanghai, China; Referees: Marcela Mauss (GER), Adil Aimbetov (KAZ)
9 June 2017; 17:40	Arima 2	Goals	McKelvey 4	Shanghai Oriental Sports Center, Shanghai, China; Referees: Marcela Mauss (GER), Adil Aimbetov (KAZ)

9 June 2017; 19:00	Russia	16–8	China	Shanghai Oriental Sports Center, Shanghai, China; Referees: Diana Dutilh (NED), Nicola Johnson (AUS)
9 June 2017; 19:00	Score by quarters: 4–2, 5–0, 5–3, 2–3			Shanghai Oriental Sports Center, Shanghai, China; Referees: Diana Dutilh (NED), Nicola Johnson (AUS)
9 June 2017; 19:00	Karimova, Gorbunova 3	Goals	Xiao 4	Shanghai Oriental Sports Center, Shanghai, China; Referees: Diana Dutilh (NED), Nicola Johnson (AUS)

==== Semifinals ====
All times are CST (UTC+8)

10 June 2017; 17:40	Russia	10–11	Canada	Shanghai Oriental Sports Center, Shanghai, China; Referees: Martina Kunikova (SVK), Nicola Johnson (AUS)
10 June 2017; 17:40	Score by quarters: 5–3, 3–1, 2–3, 0–4			Shanghai Oriental Sports Center, Shanghai, China; Referees: Martina Kunikova (SVK), Nicola Johnson (AUS)
10 June 2017; 17:40	Gorbunova 3	Goals	McKelvey 3	Shanghai Oriental Sports Center, Shanghai, China; Referees: Martina Kunikova (SVK), Nicola Johnson (AUS)

10 June 2017; 19:00	Hungary	4–8	United States	Shanghai Oriental Sports Center, Shanghai, China; Referees: Diana Dutilh (NED), Liang Zhang (CHN)
10 June 2017; 19:00	Score by quarters: 1–2, 0–4, 0–2, 3–0			Shanghai Oriental Sports Center, Shanghai, China; Referees: Diana Dutilh (NED), Liang Zhang (CHN)
10 June 2017; 19:00	Keszthelyi 2	Goals	Musselman 3	Shanghai Oriental Sports Center, Shanghai, China; Referees: Diana Dutilh (NED), Liang Zhang (CHN)

==== Bronze medal match ====
All times are CST (UTC+8)

11 June 2017; 17:10	(bronze) Russia	9–7	Hungary	Shanghai Oriental Sports Center, Shanghai, China; Referees: Diana Dutilh (NED), Marcela Mauss (GER)
11 June 2017; 17:10	Score by quarters: 3–1, 1–2, 2–0, 3–4			Shanghai Oriental Sports Center, Shanghai, China; Referees: Diana Dutilh (NED), Marcela Mauss (GER)
11 June 2017; 17:10	Karimova 3	Goals	Bujka 4	Shanghai Oriental Sports Center, Shanghai, China; Referees: Diana Dutilh (NED), Marcela Mauss (GER)

==== Final ====
All times are CST (UTC+8)

11 June 2017; 18:30	(silver) Canada	6–12	United States (gold)	Shanghai Oriental Sports Center, Shanghai, China; Referees: Svetlana Dreval (RUS), Filippo Gomez (ITA)
11 June 2017; 18:30	Score by quarters: 1–2, 3–4, 2–3, 0–3			Shanghai Oriental Sports Center, Shanghai, China; Referees: Svetlana Dreval (RUS), Filippo Gomez (ITA)
11 June 2017; 18:30	E. Wright, McKelvey 2	Goals	five players 2	Shanghai Oriental Sports Center, Shanghai, China; Referees: Svetlana Dreval (RUS), Filippo Gomez (ITA)

5th–8th Places

Semifinals
10 June 2017
China	12
Japan	11
10 June 2017
Netherlands	9
Australia	5

Fifth place
11 June 2017
China	4
Netherlands	14
Seventh place
11 June 2017
Japan	8
Australia	10

==== 5th–8th Places Semifinals ====
All times are CST (UTC+8)

10 June 2017; 15:00	Netherlands	9–5	Australia	Shanghai Oriental Sports Center, Shanghai, China; Referees: Marcela Mauss (GER), Tadao Tahara (JPN)
10 June 2017; 15:00	Score by quarters: 2–1, 2–1, 2–1, 3–2			Shanghai Oriental Sports Center, Shanghai, China; Referees: Marcela Mauss (GER), Tadao Tahara (JPN)
10 June 2017; 15:00	van der Graaf 2	Goals	Ridge, Halligan 2	Shanghai Oriental Sports Center, Shanghai, China; Referees: Marcela Mauss (GER), Tadao Tahara (JPN)

10 June 2017; 16:20	China	12–11	Japan	Shanghai Oriental Sports Center, Shanghai, China; Referees: Svetlana Dreval (RUS), Filippo Gomez (ITA)
10 June 2017; 16:20	Score by quarters: 2–3, 2–3, 4–3, 4–2			Shanghai Oriental Sports Center, Shanghai, China; Referees: Svetlana Dreval (RUS), Filippo Gomez (ITA)
10 June 2017; 16:20	Xiong 5	Goals	Arima 3	Shanghai Oriental Sports Center, Shanghai, China; Referees: Svetlana Dreval (RUS), Filippo Gomez (ITA)

==== 7th Place match ====
All times are CST (UTC+8)

11 June 2017; 14:30	Japan	8–10	Australia	Shanghai Oriental Sports Center, Shanghai, China; Referees: Liang Zhang (CHN), Rajmund Fodor (HUN)
11 June 2017; 14:30	Score by quarters: 2–5, 3–2, 2–1, 1–2			Shanghai Oriental Sports Center, Shanghai, China; Referees: Liang Zhang (CHN), Rajmund Fodor (HUN)
11 June 2017; 14:30	Inaba 4	Goals	Webster 5	Shanghai Oriental Sports Center, Shanghai, China; Referees: Liang Zhang (CHN), Rajmund Fodor (HUN)

==== 5th Place match ====
All times are CST (UTC+8)

11 June 2017; 16:00	China	4–14	Netherlands	Shanghai Oriental Sports Center, Shanghai, China; Referees: Amber Drury (USA), Adil Aimbetov (KAZ)
11 June 2017; 16:00	Score by quarters: 0–4, 3–2, 0–4, 1–4			Shanghai Oriental Sports Center, Shanghai, China; Referees: Amber Drury (USA), Adil Aimbetov (KAZ)
11 June 2017; 16:00	Mei, Zhao 2	Goals	Smit, Megens 3	Shanghai Oriental Sports Center, Shanghai, China; Referees: Amber Drury (USA), Adil Aimbetov (KAZ)

== Final ranking ==
Rank	Team
Gold medal	United States
Silver medal	Canada
Bronze medal	Russia
4	Hungary
5	Netherlands
6	China
7	Australia
8	Japan

2017 FINA Women's Water Polo World League

United States
Eleventh title

Team Roster

Gabby Stone, Maddie Musselman, Melissa Seidemann, Rachel Fattal, Mary Brooks, Maggie Steffens (C), Jordan Raney, Kiley Neushul, Aria Fischer, Jamie Neushul, Makenzie Fischer, Alys Williams, Mia Rycraw. Head coach: Adam Krikorian.

== Individual awards ==
- Most Valuable Player
  - Makenzie Fischer (USA)
- Best Goalkeeper
  - Jessica Gaudreault (CAN)
- Top Scorer
  - Catharina van der Sloot (NED) — 15 goals
- Media All Star Team
  - Jessica Gaudreault (CAN)
  - Yumi Arima (JPN)
  - Makenzie Fischer (USA)
  - Elvina Karimova (RUS)
  - Hayley McKelvey (CAN)
  - Kiley Neushul (USA)
  - Catharina van der Sloot (NED)
