= Elle Armit =

Australian water polo player

Personal information
- Full name: Elle Susan Armit
- Born: 20 August 1991 (age 34) Townsville, Queensland, Australia
- Height: 185 cm (6 ft 1 in)

Sport
- Country: Australia
- Sport: Water polo
- Club: Queensland Thunder
- Team: Australia women's national water polo team; Drummoyne Devils
- Coached by: Rebecca Rippon; Maureen O'Toole
Medal record
Representing Australia
Olympic Games
Silver medal – second place	2024 Paris	Team
Summer Universiade
Gold medal – first place	2015 Gwangju	Team

Elle Susan Armit (born 20 August 1991) is an Australian female water polo Olympian. She was born in Townsville, Queensland, Australia in 1991.

Her coach is Maureen O'Toole.

== Early life ==
Armit was introduced to a modified version of water polo called ‘Flippaball’ when she was ten years old. She showed promise and joined Townsville Water Polo club as a junior.

== Achievements ==
She debuted for the Australian national team, the Aussie Stingers, in 2013.

A highlight was scoring four goals in a 10-7 win against USA in the group stages of the 2017 FINA World League. She also won bronze at the 2019 FINA World Championships and gold at the 2015 World University Games.

Armit was a member of the Australian Stingrays squad that competed at the Tokyo 2020 Olympics. By finishing second in their pool, the Aussie Stingers went through to the quarterfinals. They were beaten 8-9 by Russia and therefore did not compete for an Olympic medal.

She was part of the Australian women's water polo team that finished in second place at the 2024 Summer Olympics.
