= Ekaterina Prokofyeva =

Russian water polo player (born 1991)

Personal information
- Full name: Ekaterina Valeryevna Prokofyeva
- Nationality: Russia
- Born: March 13, 1991 (age 35) Volgodonsk, Rostov Oblast, Soviet Union
- Height: 1.77 m (5 ft 10 in)

Sport
- Sport: Water polo
- Position: Centre forward
- Current club: Kinef-Surgutneftegaz Kirishi
Medal record
Women's water polo
Representing Russia
Olympic Games
Bronze medal – third place	2016 Rio de Janeiro	Team
World Championships
Bronze medal – third place	2009 Rome	Team
Bronze medal – third place	2011 Shanghai	Team
Bronze medal – third place	2017 Budapest	Team
European Championships
Gold medal – first place	2008 Malaga
Gold medal – first place	2010 Zagreb
Silver medal – second place	2020 Budapest
FINA World Cup
Silver medal – second place	2018 Surgut
FINA World League
Gold medal – first place	2008 Santa Cruz de Tenerife
Silver medal – second place	2013 Beijing
Bronze medal – third place	2017 Shanghai
Bronze medal – third place	2018 Kunshan
Bronze medal – third place	2019 Budapest
Bronze medal – third place	2021 Athens
LEN Europa Cup
Silver medal – second place	2019 Turin
Universiade
Gold medal – first place	2013 Kazan	Team

Ekaterina Valeryevna Prokofyeva (Russian: Екатерина Валерьевна Прокофьева; born March 13, 1991) is a Russian water polo player. She competed at the 2016 Summer Olympics for the Russian national team in the Women's event winning the bronze medal. She had previously competed at the 2008 and 2012 Summer Olympics.

She also competed at the 2013 Summer Universiade in Kazan where she won the gold medal.

Prokofyeva was named Best Female Player of the Year at the 2018 Total Player Awards.

== Club honours ==
- 2 LEN Euro League
  - 2017.
  - 2018.
- 1 LEN Super Cup
  - 2017.
- 10 Russian Federation Championships
  - 2010, 2011, 2012, 2013, 2014, 2015, 2016, 2017, 2018 and 2019.

== See also ==
- List of Olympic medalists in water polo (women)
- List of players who have appeared in multiple women's Olympic water polo tournaments
- List of women's Olympic water polo tournament top goalscorers
- List of World Aquatics Championships medalists in water polo
