= Jordan Raney =

American water polo player (born 1996)

Personal information
- Born: June 2, 1996 (age 30) Santa Monica, California, U.S.
- Height: 5 ft (152 cm)

Sport
- Sport: Water polo
- Position: 2-Meter Defender
- College team: Stanford University
- Current club: Olympiacos Piraeus
National team
- Years: Team
- 2017—: United States
Medal record
Women's water polo
Representing the United States
World Championships
Gold medal – first place	2017 Budapest	Team
Gold medal – first place	2022 Budapest	Team
Gold medal – first place	2024 Doha	Team
World Cup
Gold medal – first place	2018 Surgut
Gold medal – first place	2023 Long Beach
Gold medal – first place	2026 Sydney
World League
Gold medal – first place	2017 Shanghai
Gold medal – first place	2018 Kunshan
Gold medal – first place	2019 Budapest
Gold medal – first place	2021 Athens
Summer Universiade
Gold medal – first place	2017 Taipei	Team
- Updated on February 16, 2024

Jordan Raney (born June 2, 1996) is an American water polo player who is a member of the United States women's national water polo team. She was part of the gold medal-winning American team at the 2017 World Aquatics Championships in Budapest.

== College career ==
Raney played water polo at Stanford University where she helped lead the Cardinal to NCAA Championships in 2015 and 2017. In 2018 Raney was 1st Team All-American and 1st Team All-MPSF.

== International career ==
Raney made her Senior National Team debut in 2017, winning the FINA World League Super Final. A standout defender, she made her professional debut competing for NC Vouliagmeni in Greece alongside Team USA teammates Ashleigh Johnson and Stephania Haralabidis. She currently plays for Greek powerhouse Olympiacos Piraeus, with whom she won the 2021–22 LEN Euro League.

She trained full-time with the U.S. team for two years with the goal of competing at the 2020 Summer Olympics, but she didn't make the final roster.

In 2022, Raney led Team USA with 12 goals as well as being named the Media All-Star Team at the 2022 FINA World League Super Final in Santa Cruz de Tenerife. At the 2022 FINA Championships in Budapest, Raney scored 5 goals for Team USA.

=== International Competition Highlights ===
- 2022 FINA World League Super Final, Santa Cruz de Tenerife, Spain, 3rd Place
- 2022 FINA World Championships, Budapest, Hungary, 1st Place
- 2021 FINA World League Super Final, Athens, Greece, 1st Place
- 2019 Holiday Cup, Princeton, NJ, 1st Place
- 2019 Canada Cup, Montreal, Canada, 1st Place
- 2019 FINA World Championships, Budapest, Hungary, 1st Place
- 2019 FINA International Tournament, Perth, Australia, 1st Place
- 2018 FINA World Cup, Surgut, Russia, 1st Place
- 2018 FINA World League Super Final, Kunshan, China, 1st Place
- 2017 FINA World Championships, Budapest, Hungary, 1st Place
- 2017 FINA World League Super Final, Shanghai, China, 1st Place
- 2015 FINA Junior World Championships, Volos, Greece, 1st Place
- 2015 World University Games, Gwangju, South Korea, 5th Place
- 2014 FINA Youth World Championships, Madrid, Spain, 1st Place
- 2014 UANA Youth Pan American Championship, Riverside, California, 1st Place
- 2011 UANA Youth Pan American Championships, Puerto Rico, 1st
