= Ioanna Haralabidis =

American water polo player

Personal information
- Nationality: Greek
- Born: May 19, 1995 (age 31) Athens, Greece
- Height: 5 ft 11 in (180 cm)

Sport
- Country: GRE; USA
- Sport: Water polo
- College team: USC Trojans
- Club: Ethnikos
Medal record
Women's water polo
Representing Greece
FINA World League
Bronze medal – third place	2012 Changshu

Ioanna Haralabidis (in Greek: Ιωάννα Χαραλαμπίδη; born May 19, 1995) is a Greek-born American water polo player.

== College career ==
Haralabidis attended University of Southern California, playing on the women's water polo team from 2014 to 2017. She won NCAA championships in 2016.

== International career ==
Haralabidis has competed on both the junior and senior national teams for Greece. Won a gold medal at 2011 European Junior Championship in Madrid, Spain. Won another gold at 2012 World Championships in Perth, Australia. Won a gold at 2014 European Championship in Ostia, Italy. She also won a bronze medal with the senior team at 2012 FINA World League in Changshu, China.

== Club career ==
Ioanna plays for the 2021–22 season for Ethnikos, a club with longstanding tradition in Greek and European water polo. Along with her sister Stephania, she helped her team win the 2021-22 LEN Trophy.

== Personal life ==
Haralabidis has two sisters, her twin Stephania and older sister Anastasia.
