= Erika Figge =

American water polo player (born 1985)

Personal information
- Born: January 9, 1985 (age 41) Orange, California, U.S.
- Height: 5 ft 10 in (178 cm)

Sport
- Sport: Water Polo
- Position: Attacker (WP Offense, Utility player)
- College team: University of Southern California
- Coached by: Jovan Vavic (USC); Guy Baker U.S. National Team; A. Krikorian U.S. National Team
Medal record
Women's water polo
Representing the United States
World Championship
Silver medal – second place	2005 Montréal	Team competition
Pan American Games
Gold medal – first place	2007 Rio de Janeiro	Team competition

Erika Figge (born January 9, 1985) is a former swimmer and water polo player from the United States, who competed for the University of Southern California. She made one of her first and more noteworthy appearances in elite competition at the US National Women's Water Polo Team that won the silver medal at the 2005 World Aquatics Championships in Montréal, Canada.

== Early life ==
Erika was born January 9, 1985, one of two sisters to Eric and Heidi Figge in Orange, California. Erika's sister Brooke also competed in High School swimming. Erika spent her High School years in Rancho Santa Margarita, a roughly fifty mile drive from Los Angeles. She attended Santa Margarita Catholic High School, a four-year co-ed preparatory school, where she earned All American honors four times, and was a four-time First Team All Serra League honoree. Strong on water polo offense at Santa Margarita High, and exhibiting speed and shooting accuracy, Figge led the Eagles with 70 goals in the 2000-2001 season. At Santa Margarita, Figge was managed and trained in water polo by Coach Scott Taylor in the 2001 season. A multi-sport athlete, in addition to her water polo honors, she was a high school All-American in swimming in the 100 and 50 freestyle.

== University of Southern California ==
A Sociology major, Figge attended the University of Southern California, from around 2003-2007, where she was coached by Montenegro-born USC Head Coach Jovan Vavic. Olympian Brittany Hayes was one of Figge's USC teammates. Figge had a fifth highest team total of 33 goals in her Freshman year, a fourth highest team total of 32 goals as a Sophomore, and a sixth highest total of 22 goals as a Junior in 2006. She functioned frequently as an attacker, a strong versatile offensive player, who could play nearly any position including driver, wing, and hold set (center).

== International competition highlights ==
In June, 2001, as a sixteen-year old junior player in her preview game with the U.S. women's Senior National Team at the Championship game of the Canada Cup in Montreal, Figge scored a goal in the fourth quarter in the U.S. team's 14-8 loss to Australian. Being the final championship game, the U.S. women's team took home the silver medal under U.S. National Team Coach Guy Baker.

Scoring two goals for Team USA, at the 2005 FINA World Championships Figge captured a silver medal. As part of America's Junior National Team, where she captured a gold at the 2005 FINA Junior World Championships in 2005, and at the 2003 FINA Junior World Championships won the silver.

She won a team gold medal in water polo at the 2007 Pan American games in Rio de Janeiro.

In June, 2009, Figge was named to the USA Water Polo Women's Senior National Team for the 2009 FINA World Championships.

== International competitions ==
- 2003 – 2003 FINA Junior World Championships, Calgary, Canada (2nd place)
- 2005 – 2005 FINA Junior World Championships, Perth, Australia (1st place)
- 2005 – FINA World League, Kirishi, Russia (5th place)
- 2005 – World Championships, Montréa, Canada (2nd place)
- 2006 – 2006 FINA Women's World League, Cosenza, Italy (1st place)
- 2006 – 2006 Holiday Cup, Los Alamitos, USA (1st place)
- 2006 – 2006 FINA Women's World Cup, Tianjin, China (4th place)
- 2007 – 2007 FINA Women's World League Super Final, Montreal, Canada (1st place)
- 2007 – Pan American Games, Rio de Janeiro, Brazil (1st place)

== See also ==
- List of World Aquatics Championships medalists in water polo
