= Patty Cardenas =

American water polo player (born 1984)

Personal information
- Born: August 19, 1984 (age 41) Commerce, California, U.S.
- Height: 5 ft 6 in (168 cm)
Medal record
Women's water polo
Representing the United States
Olympic Games
Silver medal – second place	2008 Beijing	Team competition
World Championships
Gold medal – first place	2007 Melbourne	Team competition

Patricia Cardenas (born August 19, 1984) is an American water polo player. She played for Bell Gardens High School, Golden West College, University of Southern California, and the United States national water polo team.

== Career ==
=== High school ===
Cardenas attended Bell Gardens High School, where she played water polo for four years and won four CIF Division III championships. She was a first team All-American three times.

=== College ===
Cardenas played water polo for Golden West College. In 2002, the team won the state championship, and Cardenas was named the California Community College MVP.

Cardenas later transferred to the University of Southern California. In 2006, her first season with the Trojans, she ranked third on the team with 40 goals. She was an All-American honorable mention. She took a leave of absence from USC to train with the national team.

=== International ===
Cardenas made the U.S. senior national team after attending open tryouts in 2006. In 2007, she scored four goals in the FINA World Championships, four goals in the FINA World League Super Final, and three goals in the Pan American Games; the U.S. finished first in all three tournaments. At the 2008 Summer Olympics, Cardenas scored two goals, helping the U.S. win the silver medal.

== Personal ==
Cardenas was born in Commerce, California. She is 5 feet 6 inches (1.68 m) tall. She has two brothers and her family is of Mexican descent.

== See also ==
- List of Olympic medalists in water polo (women)
- List of world champions in women's water polo
- List of World Aquatics Championships medalists in water polo
