= Water polo at the 1981 World Games =

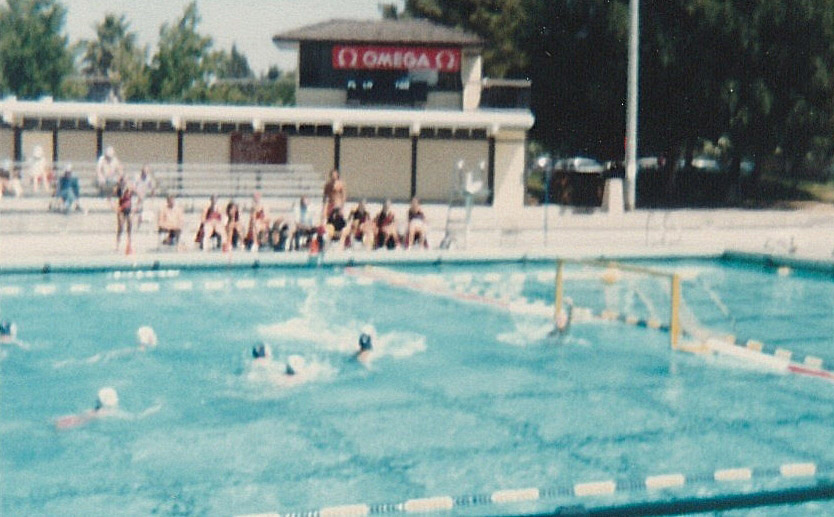
Goal being scored in women's water polo at World Games I

The World Games I women's water polo competition was held on July 25–27, 1981, at Santa Clara International Swim Center in Santa Clara, California. Teams from the United States (2), Netherlands and Canada participated. Six days before the first game, Canada had become the newly-crowned World Cup champion in Brisbane, Australia, in a competition that included the same three teams that medaled in these Games.

== Medalists ==
Gold	Silver	Bronze
Netherlands J. Boer; Brinkhof; Dorine Heijnert; Kok; Ria Roos; Ingrid Scholten; Elly Spijker; Ann van Beek; Leineke van den Heuvel; Marion van den Mark; Greet van den Veen others.	United States I Lynn Comer; Laura Cox; Ruth Cox; Debbie Decker; Leslie Entwistle; Karen Hastie; Vaune Kadlubek; Simone LaPay; Robin Linn; Sue McIntyre; Maureen O'Toole; Marla Smith other	Canada Sylvie Archambault; Tracy Crandall; Odile Delaserra; Isabel Deschamps; Michele Despatis; Jocelyn Dumais; Diedre Finshaw; Johanne Gervais; Janice Gilbey; Heather Gifford; Hilary Knowles; Denise Prefontaine; Sylvie Thibault

== Standing ==
Team	W	L	GF	GA
Netherlands	3	0	52	17
United States I	2	1	30	23
Canada	1	2	24	29
United States II	0	3	10	47

== Details ==
Saturday, July 25, 1981:

United States I 14, United States II 4
Netherlands 17, Canada 7

Sunday, July 26, 1981:

United States I 9, Canada 6
Netherlands 22, United States II 3

Monday, July 27, 1981:

Netherlands 13, United States I 7
Canada 11, United States II 3

Other known individual participants: USA – Marybeth Rozance
