= Ryann Neushul =

American water polo player (born 1999)

Personal information
- Full name: Ryann Catherine Neushul
- Born: December 30, 1999 (age 26) Isla Vista, California, U.S.
- Height: 5 ft 7 in (1.71 m)

Sport
- Country: United States
- Sport: Water polo
Medal record
Women's water polo
Representing the United States
World Championships
Gold medal – first place	2019 Gwangju	Team
Gold medal – first place	2022 Budapest	Team
Gold medal – first place	2024 Doha	Team
World Cup
Gold medal – first place	2026 Sydney
Pan American Games
Gold medal – first place	2023 Santiago	Team

Ryann Catherine Neushul (/ˈnuːʃəl/ NOO-shəl; born December 30, 1999) is an American water polo player who played for Stanford University and the US Olympic team. On June 7, 2025, she was awarded the Peter J. Cutino Award as best women's college water polo player of the year in 2025.

== Early life and water polo career ==
Ryann Neushul grew up in Isla Vista, California with her parents Peter and Cathy and two older sisters Kiley and Jamie. All three sisters played water polo growing up. Their mother, Cathy Neushul, who coached all three sisters throughout their club careers, is now the technical director for Santa Barbara 805. Neushul played for Santa Barbara Aquatics from 2007–2018, helping her team to numerous Club Championships titles. Each of Neushul's older sisters played water polo at Stanford University, winning 3 NCAA championships, and each won an Olympic gold medal.

After graduating from Dos Pueblos High School in 2018, Neushul attended Stanford University. She is the only player in Stanford women’s water polo history to have won four NCAA titles, having played on championship-winning teams in 2019, 2022, 2023, and 2025. In the intervening years, she trained with the US national team. She played in the 2024 Paris Olympics for the US team, which finished fourth.
