= New Zealand women's national water polo team =

National water polo team

New Zealand
- FINA code: NZL
- Association: New Zealand Water Polo
- Confederation: OSA (Oceania)
- Head coach: Angela Winstanley-Smith
- Asst coach: Eelco Uri
- Captain: Jessica Milicich

FINA ranking (since 2008)
- Highest: 12 (2010, 2011)

World Championship
- Appearances: 16 (first in 1991)
- Best result: 7th place (1991)

World Cup
- Appearances: 8 (first in 1979)
- Best result: 4th place (1984)

World League
- Appearances: 1 (first in 2022)
- Best result: 8th place (2022)

The New Zealand women's national water polo team represents the New Zealand in international women's water polo competitions and friendly matches.

== Results ==
=== World Championship ===
- 1991 – 7th place
- 1994 – 10th place
- 1998 – 11th place
- 2001 – 12th place
- 2005 – 12th place
- 2007 – 12th place
- 2009 – 12th place
- 2011 – 12th place
- 2013 – 12th place
- 2015 – 13th place
- 2017 – 12th place
- 2019 – 12th place
- 2022 – 10th place
- 2023 – 11th place
- 2024 – 9th place
- 2025 – 10th place

=== World Cup ===
- 1979 – 5th place
- 1984 – 4th place
- 1988 – 6th place
- 1991 – 7th place
- 1995 – 8th place
- 2010 – 8th place
- 2018 – 7th place
- 2023 – 8th place

=== World League ===
- 2022 – 8th place

== Current squad ==
Roster for the 2025 World Championships.

Head coach: Angela Winstanley-Smith

- 1 Jessica Milicich GK
- 2 Emily Nicholson FP
- 3 Gabrielle Doyle FP
- 4 Libby Gault FP
- 5 Gabrielle Milicich FP
- 6 Darcy Spark FP
- 7 Emmerson Houghton FP
- 8 Millie Quin FP
- 9 Sophie Shorter-Robinson FP
- 10 Morgan McDowall FP
- 11 Kaitlin Howarth FP
- 12 Agatha Weston FP
- 13 Bridget Layburn GK
- 14 Holly Dunn FP

== See also ==
- New Zealand men's national water polo team
