= Gabby Stone =

American water polo player (born 1994)

Personal information
- Full name: Gabrielle Stone
- Nationality: American
- Born: March 7, 1994 (age 32) La Jolla, California
- Height: 6 ft 0 in (183 cm)

Sport
- Sport: Water polo
- Position: Goalkeeper
- College team: Stanford University

Senior clubs
- Years: Team
- –: CN Mataro, Spain
National team
- Years: Team
- 2017—: United States
Medal record
Women's water polo
Representing the United States
World Championships
Gold medal – first place	2017 Budapest	Team
Summer Universiade
Gold medal – first place	2017 Taipei	Team
World League
Gold medal – first place	2017 Shanghai
Gold medal – first place	2018 Kunshan
- Updated on August 8, 2023

Gabrielle Stone (born March 7, 1994) is a former American water polo goalkeeper who competed for Stanford University and was a member of the United States women's national water polo team. She served as a goalkeeper for the gold medal-winning American team at the 2017 World Aquatics Championships in Budapest.

Stone was born March 7, 1994 in La Jolla, California to Guy and Susan Stone. She played water polo for La Jolla's The Bishop's School, a private Episcopal college preparatory program, that in both 2011 and 2012 won CIF San Diego Section Division III titles. She was honored in her Senior year as a San Diego County Player of the Year, She received four letters in water polo at the Biship's School, serving as team Captain in her Senior year.

== Stanford University ==
Stone played water polo at Stanford University, where she helped the Cardinals win three NCAA Championships in 2014, 2015, and 2017, while managed and trained by Head women's Coach John Tanner. Graduating in 2018, she had the third most saves for any goalie in Stanford history. As a Sophomore at Stanford in 2014, she was credited with allowing only 5.99 goals per game. She postponed her senior season in order to train with the national team in preparation for the 2016 Summer Olympics, though she didn't make the final roster. At Stanford, she received a Bachelor's in American Studies and a Masters in Communication-Media Studies.

In her professional career, she competed for the CN Mataro in Spain, placing third in the Spanish League.

== International career ==
Stone made her Senior National Team debut under Coach Adam Krikorian in 2017, winning the FINA World League Super Final where as goalie she had a remarkable 37 saves.
