= Jamie Neushul =

American water polo player (born 1995)

Personal information
- Full name: Jamie Valeri Neushul
- Born: May 12, 1995 (age 31) Goleta, California, U.S.
- Occupations: Water Polo Coach; UC Irvine, Santa Barbara WP
- Height: 5 ft 6 in (168 cm)
- Weight: 130 lb (59 kg)

Sport
- Country: United States
- Sport: Water Polo
- Position: Driver (WP); Perimeter Player
- College team: Stanford University
- Club: Santa Barbara WP; Hungary UVSE (pro)
- Team: U.S. National Team
- Coached by: John Tanner (Stanford); Adam Krikorian ('20 Olympics)
Medal record
Olympic Games
Gold medal – first place	2020 Tokyo	Team
World Championships
Gold medal – first place	2017 Budapest	Team
Pan American Games
Gold medal – first place	2019 Lima	Team
Universiade
Gold medal – first place	2017 Taipei	Team

Jamie Valeri Neushul (born May 12, 1995) is an American water polo player who is a member of the United States women's national water polo team who competed for Stanford, and played with the U.S. team at the 2020 Summer Olympics in Tokyo where she won the team gold medal. She would later play professional water polo for Hungary UVSE, and coach collegiate and high school water polo.

Jamie Neushul was born May 12, 1995 in Goleta, California to Peter and Cathy Neushul. From a family that greatly valued the sport of water polo, father Peter and mother Cathy both played for the University of Santa Barbara, and mother Cathy worked as a coach. Greatly benefitting from her parent's participation in the sport, Jamie's mother Cathy Nueshal served as a youth coach for all three of her daughters. Jamie's sister Kiley Neushul played water polo for Stanford scoring 222 collegiate career goals, and was a 2016 Olympic gold medalist. Her sister Ryann Neushul also played water polo for Stanford, was a 2025 Peter J. Cutino Award winner, and played with the U.S. Olympic women's team at the 2024 Paris Olympics that finished fourth.

== Dos Pueblos High ==
Graduating in 2013, Jamie attended Goleta's Dos Pueblos High School, just Northwest of Santa Barbara, where she was a three-year swimmer, participated in water polo for four years, and was a member of the cross country team for a year. During her High School water polo career, playing for the California Interscholastic Federation (CIF), she helped lead Dos Pueblos to 2010 and 2011 Southern Section Division I titles. In the Southern Section title championship in 2010, she scored goals that both tied and won the game. In Club water polo from 2005-2013, she competed for the Santa Barbara Water Polo Club where she would later coach. For three consecutive years from 2011-2013, she made First Team for All-CIF Southern Section Division I.

== Stanford University ==
Neushul attended and played water polo for Stanford University where she was coached by John Tanner, who won ten NCAA titles coaching the women's team from 1998-2025. During her four collegiate years with Stanford, Jamie made All-American and Academic All-American four times, and played on Stanford teams that had the distinction of capturing NCAA national championships in 2014, 2015 and 2017. As a Senior in 2017, she had the third most goals with a total of 38, led team seasonal scoring total as a Junior with 49 goals in 2016, and was fourth on the team in total goals as a Sophomore with 28 in 2015. In 2014, she was seventh on the team as a Freshman in total season scoring with a total of 20. She played with the Stanford team at the World University games in Gwanju, South Korea, placing fifth, where she was the high point scorer for Stanford, with 18 goals, making her the fifth highest scorer in the tournament.

== 2020 Tokyo Olympic gold medal ==
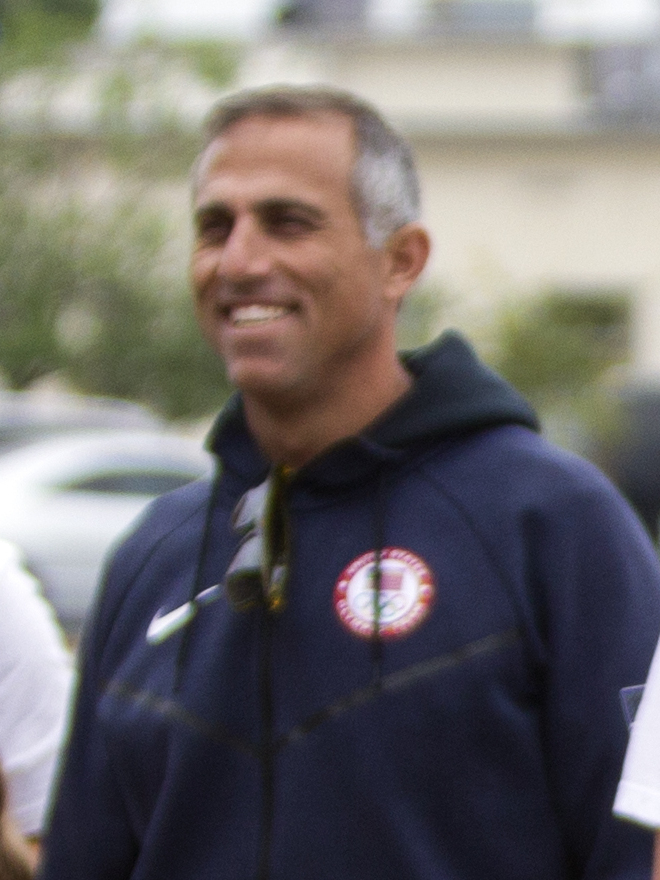
Coach Krikorian

Neushul competed with the U.S. women's water polo team at the 2020 Summer Olympics winning the gold medal in the women's water polo tournament under the U.S. women team's Olympic head coach Adam Krikorian. Krikorian had played water polo for UCLA, and had a positive win record coaching the UCLA women's team. In 2020, the United States was a distinct pre-Olympic favorite to win the gold medal, having captured the two previous Olympic medals in 2012 and 2016 under Krikorian, as well as having won the 2015, 2017, and 2019 World Championships.

In final competition, the U.S. women's team won the gold medal, defeating Spain 14-5 in the final round to determine the gold and silver medal winners. Strong in the late rounds, the U.S. Women had previously won both their quarter-final and semi-final rounds, while Spain beat the strong women's teams from China and Hungary to also move to the final round. In early rounds, in an unexpected outcome, the U.S. women had lost to Hungary, a country with a strong tradition in men's water polo.

== Professional pursuits ==
In 2018-19, she competed for Hungary's professional team UVSE in Hungary.

=== Coaching water polo ===
From 2017-2019, Jamie worked as a water polo coach for University of California Irvine, and has worked for the Santa Barbara Water Polo Club. She planned to begin as the coach for the San Marcos High School girl's water polo team for the 1925-6 season.

=== International competition highlights ===
From 2016-2021, Neushul competed for the U.S. National team, known as Team USA. During that period, she captured 14 gold medals in international competition. She became world champion at the 2017 World Aquatics Championships in Budapest and was a member of the team at the 2017 Summer Universiade, 2017 FINA Women's Water Polo World League, 2018 FINA Women's Water Polo World Cup, 2019 Pan American Games, and 2019 FINA Women's Water Polo World League. She was captain of the U.S. team that won the gold medal in Volos, Greece, in August 2015 at the FINA Junior World Championships.
