= Ericka Lorenz =

American water polo player (born 1981)

Personal information
- Full name: Ericka Denise Lorenz
- Born: February 18, 1981 (age 45) San Diego, California, U.S.
- Height: 180 cm (5 ft 11 in)
- Weight: 71 kg (157 lb)

Sport
- Sport: Water Polo
- College team: University of California Berkeley
- Club: Ortigia-Siracusa (Italy, pro team)
- Coached by: Peter Asch (Berkeley); Guy Baker (Olympics)
Medal record
Women's water polo
Representing the United States
Olympic Games
Silver medal – second place	2000 Sydney	Team competition
Bronze medal – third place	2004 Athens	Team competition
World Championships
Gold medal – first place	2003 Barcelona	Team competition
Gold medal – first place	2007 Melbourne	Team competition
Silver medal – second place	2005 Montréal	Team competition

Ericka Denise Lorenz (born February 18, 1981) was an American water polo player, who competed for the University of California Berkeley, and won a silver medal at the 2000 Summer Olympics in Sydney and a bronze medal at the 2004 Summer Olympics in Athens. Since retiring from competitive water polo in 2008, she has worked as lifeguard in Huntington Beach, CA, and a Los Angeles County Ocean Lifeguard Specialist.

== Early life ==
Lorenz was born in San Diego, California on February 18, 1981 to parents Duane and Denise Lorenz. Ericka attended San Diego's Patrick Henry High, where she received first team All-American honors in water polo in the years 1998, 1997, and 1999. Lorenz was an All-CIF Player of the year in water polo in her Sophomore year. A multi-sport athlete, she was a recipient of first team All-California Interscholastic Federation honors twice in volleyball and an offensive team MVP in four years in softball.

== University of California Berkeley ==
She attended UC Berkeley, where she competed in water polo for two years including the 2001 and 2002 seasons. In her first year playing water polo at Berkeley under Head women's coach Peter Asch, Lorenz led the California Golden Bears women's team in scoring with 44 goals and received All-American first team honors. As a Sophomore at Berkeley, she was second for the year in scoring with 37 goals. In her Berkeley career, she distinguished herself as a collegiate player, scoring 81 goals in two seasons.

== Olympics ==
=== 2000 Sydney Olympic silver ===
Around 1999, Lorenz was chosen for the American women's National Team, with U.C. Berkeley freshman teammate Heather Petri, where she was trained and mentored by Olympic women's Coach Guy Baker. The 2000 Olympics was the first to feature women in the water polo competition, and the U.S. women's team took home the silver medal. Lorenz scored a total of six goals in Olympic play. At 19, she was the youngest member of the American Olympic Team to participate in the 2000 Sydney Olympics.

In their first game against the Australian team, the U.S. women lost 7-6. Australia won four of their first five matches, and were seeded first advancing to the semi-finals. In the semi-finals, Australia and the U.S. team defeated Russia and the Netherlands, 7-6 and 6-5, respectively, removing them from medal contention. In the final match for the gold and silver medals, the US team were ahead 2–1 over Australia at halftime. With only 13 seconds remaining on the clock, the U.S. team scored bringing the game to a 3–3 tie, but with just 1.3 seconds left in the game, Australia scored on a penalty shot, winning the gold medal, by the close score of 4-3, with the U.S. taking the silver. Ericka scored one of her goals during the American team's final 4-3 loss to Australia. The women's team from Russia took the bronze medal.

=== 2004 Athens Olympic bronze ===
Competing again under Head Olympic Coach Guy Baker, Lorenz participated in the 2004 Summer Olympics in Athens where she won a bronze medal in the Women's water polo competition. Lorenz scored a goal in a preliminary match against Canada, though the U.S. Team lost 6-5. In the unusual loss, the U.S. women held a 4–1 lead into the fourth quarter, when Canada scored five goals in the games last six minutes of play. In one of the 2004 Olympic semi-finals, the Greek team beat Australia 6–2 to move on to the finals. Italy trailed the U.S. Women's water polo team for most of the other semi-final game, but eventually won 6-5 leaving the U.S. team with the bronze medal. Italy had defeated Greece, 7-2, in group play, but the final game for the gold and silver medal was quite close, and was tied 7–7 at the end of regular play. Greece took a 9–7 lead in overtime, but Italy tied the game, and then won the game by a score of 10–9 in a second overtime, capturing the gold medal, with Greece receiving the silver.

=== International competition highlights ===
In international competition, Lorenz won a gold medal in the 2003 World Championship in Barcelona, Spain, the first U.S. women's team to win a World Championship in water polo. She made a valuable contribution to the US team at the 2003 Barcelona World Championships by scoring 4 goals in the final game, distinguishing herself as an outstanding outside shooter. She later won a silver medal with the U.S. team at the 2005 World Championships in Montreal. She won a second gold with the U.S. team at the 2007 World Championships in Melbourne, Australia. In Pan American competition, she won a gold medal at the 2003 Pan American Games in Santo Domingo. In earlier competition, she won a gold medal at the 2001 World Junior Championships in Perth, Australia.

=== Careers ===
When not competing for Team USA, Lorenz played professional water polo player for the Italian team, Ortigia-Siracusa. She retired from elite water polo competition in 2008 due primarily to an injury to her knee and did not seek a place on the 2008 Olympic team. She served as a lifeguard in Huntington Beach, CA, and ascended to the position of Los Angeles County Ocean Lifeguard Specialist.

=== Honors ===
Lorenz was admitted to the USA Water Polo Hall of Fame in 2021, partly as a result of her pioneering efforts in achieving world prominence for the U.S. women in water polo.

== See also ==
- United States women's Olympic water polo team records and statistics
- List of Olympic medalists in water polo (women)
- List of world champions in women's water polo
- List of World Aquatics Championships medalists in water polo
