= Amanda Longan =

American water polo player (born 1997)

Personal information
- Born: January 16, 1997 (age 29) Moorpark, California, U.S.
- Occupation: Coaching (Early career)
- Height: 6 ft 1 in (185 cm)

Sport
- Sport: Water polo
- Position: Goalkeeper
- College team: Univ. Southern California (USC)
- Club: 805 Santa Barbara Water Polo
- Team: United States
- Coached by: L. Felix, J. Kocur (Oaks Christian); Jovan Vavic (USC); Adam Krikorian (Olympics)
Medal record
Woman's water polo
Representing the United States
Olympic Games
Gold medal – first place	2020 Tokyo	Team
World Championships
Gold medal – first place	2017 Budapest	Team
Gold medal – first place	2019 Gwangju	Team
Gold medal – first place	2022 Budapest	Team
Gold medal – first place	2024 Doha	Team
World Cup
Gold medal – first place	2023 Long Beach
Gold medal – first place	2026 Sydney
Pan American Games
Gold medal – first place	2023 Santiago	Team

Amanda Brooke Longan (/ˈlɒŋɡən/ LONG-gən; born January 16, 1997) is an American water polo goalkeeper who competed for the University of Southern California and won a gold medal at the 2020 Summer Olympics in Tokyo. She later participated in water polo at the 2024 Olympics in Paris where the women's team placed fourth overall.

== Early life ==
Amanda Longan was born January 16, 1997, in Moorpark, California, to Jon and Kim Longan, as one of three sisters. Graduating in 2015, she attended Oaks Christian School, where in her Junior year she was named a Player of the Year. She began playing the goaltender position in her Freshman year. In 2014, she helped lead Oaks Christian to their first League championship in the Tri-Valley League. She established an Oaks Christian school record for a goaltender with 31 saves in one game. As an student at Oaks Christian, Longan was coached by Larry Felix, who had formerly coached water polo with the strong program at the Harvard-Westlake. Erin Sheehy served as Felix's Assistant coach. In her Senior year at Oaks Christian, where she served as captain, and was coached by Jack Kocur, she was selected as a Most Valuable goaltender by the Ventura County Star. In Club water polo play, she competed for the strong 805 Santa Barbara water polo team.

== University of Southern California ==
Peter Cutino trophy

Longan attended and played water polo for the University of Southern California (USC), where she was coached by Jovan Vavic, and majored in psychology. At USC, she had the third highest total career saves for a goalie in school history with 580. In 2019, she made 260 saves which were the fourth most for any goalie from USC in one season. She received first team All-American honors by the Association of Collegiate Water Polo Coaches as a Senior, earned honors as a First Team selection from the All-Mountain Pacific Sports Federation League, and was selected to the NCAA All-Tournament Second Team.

In 2018, while at USC, she had the distinction of receiving the Peter J. Cutino Award as the top women's collegiate water polo athlete of the year and was named both a National Player of the Year, and a Mountain Pacific Sports Federation Player of the Year.

== 2020 Tokyo Olympics ==
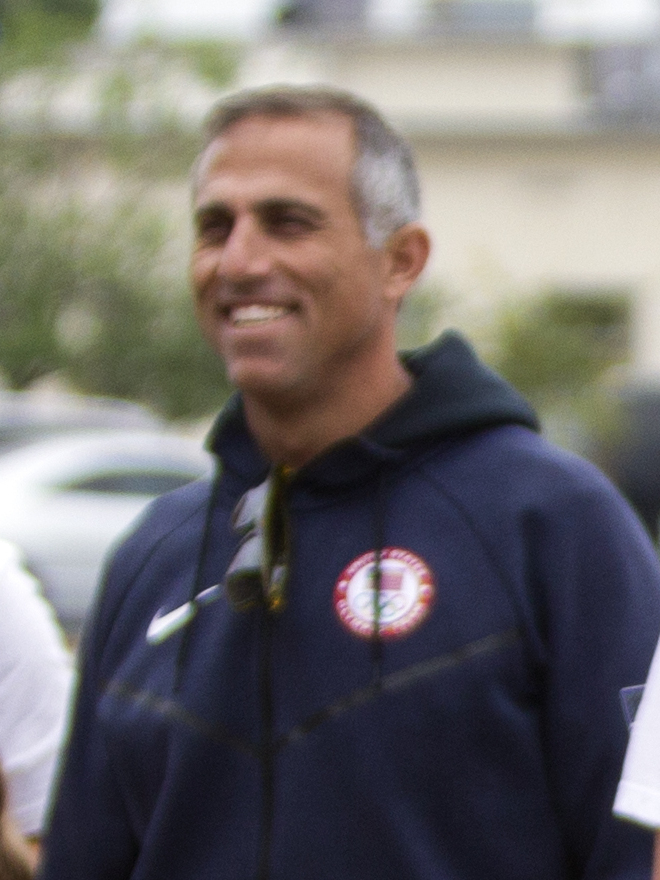
Coach Krikorian

She was part of the gold medal-winning US team in the women's water polo tournament at the 2020 Summer Olympics in Tokyo under Head Coach Adam Krikorian, who had formerly coached the women's team at UCLA.

In 2020, the U.S. women were a distinct pre-Olympic favorite to capture the gold medal, having won the two previous Olympic medals in 2012 and 2016 under Krikorian, as well as having won the 2015, 2017, and 2019 World Championships.

In final competition, the U.S. women's team won the gold medal, defeating Spain 15–6 in the final round to determine the gold and silver medal winners. Strong in the late rounds, the U.S. Women had previously won both their quarter-final and semi-final rounds, while Spain beat the strong women's teams from China and Hungary to also move to the final round. In early rounds, in an unexpected outcome, the U.S. women had lost to Hungary, a country with a strong tradition in men's water polo. As noted, the U.S. women took the gold medal, Spain took the silver, and Hungary took the bronze.

== 2024 Paris Olympics ==
Longan participated in the 2024 Paris Olympics, where the U.S. women's water polo team placed fourth overall in competition, again under Head Coach Adam Krikorian. It was the first Olympic water polo tournament since women were allowed to participate, that the women's U.S. women's team did not medal. Spain took the gold medal, Australia took the silver, and the team from the Netherlands took the bronze.

=== International competition ===
In international competition, Longan won a gold medal as part of the U.S. team at the 2017 Budapest, 2019 Gwanju, 2022 Budapest and 2024 Doha World Aquatics Championships. She also participated in the 2017 Summer Universiade, 2017 FINA Women's Water Polo World League, and the 2018 FINA Women's Water Polo World Cup. She won a gold medal with the U.S. team at the 2023 Pan American Games in Santiago, Chile.

== Life outside water polo ==
After graduating USC, in 2024 she studied clinical psychology, working towards a master's degree at Pepperdine University.

=== Coaching ===
Longan coached briefly at her alma mater USC in 2021, and in 2022, served as an Assistant coach for Women's water polo at the University of California Los Angeles.
