= Alena Serzhantova =

Russian water polo player

Personal information
- Full name: Alena Andrianovna Serzhantova
- Nationality: Russia
- Born: April 6, 1998 (age 28) Moscow, Russia
- Height: 1.74 m (5 ft 9 in)
- Weight: 74

Sport
- Sport: Water polo
- Position: Driver
- Current club: SKIF Moskomsport
Medal record
World Championships
| Bronze medal – third place | 2017 Budapest | Team |
European Championships
| Silver medal – second place | 2020 Budapest |
European Games
| Gold medal – first place | 2015 Baku | Team |

Alena Andrianovna Serzhantova (Russian: Алёна Андриановна Сержантова; 6 May 1998) is a Russian water polo player.

She competed for the Russian national team at the 2014 Women's European Water Polo Championship, and 2017 World Aquatics Championships

== See also ==
- List of World Aquatics Championships medalists in water polo
