= Stephania Haralabidis =

American water polo player

Personal information
- Nationality: American
- Born: May 19, 1995 (age 31) Athens, Greece
- Height: 5 ft 11 in (180 cm)

Sport
- Country: GRE; USA
- Sport: Water polo
- College team: USC Trojans
- Club: Ethnikos
Medal record
Women's water polo
Representing Greece
FINA World League
Bronze medal – third place	2012 Changshu
Representing United States
Olympic Games
Gold medal – first place	2020 Tokyo	Team
World Championships
Gold medal – first place	2019 Gwangju	Team
Gold medal – first place	2022 Budapest	Team
Pan American Games
Gold medal – first place	2019 Lima	Team
FINA World Cup
Gold medal – first place	2018 Surgut
FINA World League
Gold medal – first place	2018 Kunshan
Gold medal – first place	2019 Budapest
Gold medal – first place	2021 Athens

Stephania Haralabidis (Greek: Στεφανία Χαραλαμπίδη; born May 19, 1995) is a Greek American water polo player who played at USC and currently playing for Ethnikos and the U.S. national team. Haralabidis also has two sisters, her twin Ioanna and older sister Anastaia. Ioanna was also on the USC women's water polo team.

== College career ==
Haralabidis attended University of Southern California, playing on the women's water polo team from 2014 to 2017. She led the team to NCAA championship in 2016.

She won the Peter J. Cutino Award. Named National Player of the Year and MPSF Player of the Year. A First-Team All-American and named to the All-MPSF First Team. Named NCAA Tournament MVP after scoring five goals in the NCAA Championship game, including the game-winner from distance with just seconds remaining.

== International career ==
Haralabidis has competed on both the junior and senior national teams for Greece. Won a gold medal at 2011 European Junior Championship in Madrid, Spain. Won another gold at 2012 Youth World Championships in Perth, Australia. Won a gold at 2014 European U19 Championship in Ostia, Italy. She also won a bronze medal with the senior team at 2012 FINA World League in Changshu, China.

Since 2017 she is representing the U.S. national team winning a gold medal at 2018 FINA World League in Kunshan, China; and another gold at 2018 FINA World Cup in Surgut, Russia.

In 2020, Haralabidis and Team USA won an Olympic gold medal at the Tokyo Olympics.

== Club career ==
For the 2021–2022 season, Stephania plays, along with her sister Ioanna, for Greek club Ethnikos, based in Piraeus, Athens. Stephania played a vital role in order Ethnikos to win the 2021–22 Women's LEN Trophy, the club's second European club competition title.

== Personal life ==
Haralabidis has two sisters, her twin Ioanna and older sister Anastasia. Haralabidis attended Corona Del Mar High School.

== See also ==
- List of world champions in women's water polo
- List of World Aquatics Championships medalists in water polo
