= 1979 FINA Women's Water Polo World Cup =

Tournament details
- Host country: United States

Final positions
- Champions: United States (1st title)
- Runners-up: Netherlands
- Third place: Australia
- Fourth place: Canada

Official website
- FINA event site

The 1979 FINA Women's Water Polo World Cup was the first edition of the event, organised by the world's governing body in aquatics, the International Swimming Federation (FINA). The event took place in Merced, United States, from June 29 to July 1, 1979. The five participating teams played a round robin to decide the first ever winner of the event.

== Results Matrix ==
	USA	NED	AUS	CAN	NZL
United States		6 – 6	8 – 7	7 – 4	12 – 2
Netherlands	6 – 6		5 – 3	3 – 7	13 – 2
Australia	7 – 8	3 – 5		15 – 4	12 – 1
Canada	4 – 7	7 – 3	4 – 15		6 – 1
New Zealand	2 – 12	2 – 13	1 – 12	1 – 6	

== Final standings ==
	Team	Points	G	W	D	L	GF	GA	Diff
1.	United States	7	4	3	1	0	33	19	+14
2.	Netherlands	5	4	2	1	1	27	18	+9
3.	Australia	4	4	2	0	2	37	18	+19
4.	Canada	4	4	2	0	2	21	26	-5
5.	New Zealand	0	4	0	0	4	6	43	-37

== Final ranking ==
RANK	TEAM
	United States
	Netherlands
	Australia
4.	Canada
5.	New Zealand

1979 Women's FINA World Cup winners

United States
First title
