= Maureen O'Toole =

American water polo player

Maureen O'Toole -Mendoza -Purcell
Personal information
- Nickname: "Mo"
- Born: March 24, 1961 (age 65) Long Beach, California, U.S.
- Education: Azusa Pacific University MA Educ. (90); University of Hawaii BA (85)
- Occupations: Water Polo Coach; *U.C.Berkeley 95-98; *Rio Hondo College 91-95; Founder, Pursuit of Excellence Sports
- Height: 177 cm (5 ft 10 in)
- Weight: 64 kg (141 lb)
- Spouse: Jim Purcell (1995)
- Children: yes

Sport
- Sport: Swimming, Water Polo
- College team: Long Beach City College, Men's WP; University of Hawaii Swim Team
- Club: Olympic Club, San Francisco
- Coached by: Monte Nitzkowski (Long Beach State); Guy Baker (Olympics)
Medal record
Women's water polo
Representing United States
FINA World Cup
Gold medal – first place	1979 Merced	Team competition
World Games
Silver medal – second place	1981 Santa Clara	Team
Olympic Games
Silver medal – second place	2000 Sydney	Team

Maureen "Mo" O'Toole (born March 24, 1961), also known by married names Maureen Mendoza, and Maureen O'Toole Purcell is an American water polo player and coach who won a silver medal in the inaugural women's water polo championship at the 2000 Sydney Olympics. A pioneer in the early years of U.S. women's water polo, she trained in college with the men's team at Long Beach State, served as the inaugural women's water polo coach at U. Cal Berkeley, and became the first women's water polo coach to be selected as a finalist for the U.S. Olympic Committee Coach of the Year.

== Early life ==
Born in Long Beach, California on March 24, 1961, O'Toole, who swam competitively from an early age, began training and competing in water polo during the swimming off-season at age thirteen. At Wilson High School in Long Beach, California she joined the boys' water polo team because there was no team available to the girls. She played at Long Beach City College on the men's team for accomplished Water Polo Hall of Fame and U.S. National team coach Monte Nitzkowski. As there were no Water Polo athletic scholarships for women, she attended the University of Hawaiʻi on a swimming scholarship, graduating in 1985, with a 3.65 grade point average.

At age 17, O'Toole was invited to join the U.S. Women's National Water Polo Team. "Mo", as her teammates called her, was a constant figure on the team from 1978 to 1994, except in 1991 when she gave birth to her daughter Kelly. She participated in the 1979 FINA World Cup, winning a gold medal.

== 2000 Sydney Olympic silver medal ==
When women's water polo was added to the 2000 Summer Olympics, Maureen was recruited by former U.S. Women's National Team Coach and 1964 Olympic swimmer Sandy Nitta. At the 2000 Summer Olympics, O'Toole was coached by USA Water Polo Hall of Fame Coach Guy Baker, a former coach for the men's water polo team at UCLA where he had led the team to three successive national championships. O'Toole re-joined the US team out of retirement in 1997 and helped qualify the US women's team as one of the six teams eligible to participate in Sydney. At age 39, O'Toole was the oldest women water polo player at the Olympic Games, helping the US women win an Olympic silver medal at the 2000 Sydney Olympics.

=== Coaching ===
She coached water polo at Rio Hondo College in Whittier, California from 1991 to 1995, and at UC Berkeley from 1995 to 1997, and has a master's degree in education from Azuza Pacific University, received in 1990. After retiring from collegiate coaching, and her long career in competitive water polo, Maureen founded The Pursuit of Excellence Sports Academy, a non-profit foundation that teaches self-esteem and leadership training in a sports environment for girls 8–18 years of age. She also does motivational speaking for various companies about teamwork.

=== Honors ===
A twenty-two year member of the U.S. National Water Polo team, O'Tool was honored as an All American by United States Water Polo twenty-six times, and was an NCAA collegiate All-American three times. In 2003, she became a member of the USA Water Polo Hall of Fame, and in 2002 was an inductee of the California Community College Sports Hall of Fame. In April 2006, O'Toole was selected as a 2006 United States Olympic Committee Coach of the Year top five finalist, the first female water polo coach to receive this honor.

In April 2005, Maureen O'Toole married Jim Purcell, once a national and international championship water polo player and now coach of the Monte Vista High School women's water polo team.

== Achievements ==
- Most Valuable Player of the US Women's National Team 15 times
- U.S. Water Polo Female Athlete of the Year 5 times
- World Water Polo Female Athlete of the Year 6 times
- All American team for U.S. Water Polo a record 28 times
- 2000 Summer Olympics Silver Medalist
- Coached U14 girls 2014 Turbo Cup (Texas) winner

== See also ==
- List of Olympic medalists in water polo (women)
- List of World Aquatics Championships medalists in water polo
