= Maddie Musselman =

American water polo player (born 1998)

Personal information
- Full name: Madeline Musselman
- Born: June 16, 1998 (age 28) Newport Beach, California, U.S.
- Height: 5’ 11”
- Weight: 143 lb (65 kg)

Sport
- Sport: Water polo
- Position: Attacker
- College team: UCLA Bruins
National team
- Years: Team
Medal record
Women's water polo
Representing the United States
Olympic Games
Gold medal – first place	2016 Rio de Janeiro	Team
Gold medal – first place	2020 Tokyo	Team
World Championships
Gold medal – first place	2015 Kazan	Team
Gold medal – first place	2017 Budapest	Team
Gold medal – first place	2019 Gwangju	Team
Gold medal – first place	2022 Budapest	Team
Gold medal – first place	2024 Doha	Team
World Cup
Gold medal – first place	2023 Long Beach
World League
Gold medal – first place	2017 Shanghai
Gold medal – first place	2019 Budapest
Gold medal – first place	2021 Athens
Pan American Games
Gold medal – first place	2015 Toronto	Team
Gold medal – first place	2019 Lima	Team

Madeline Musselman (/ˈmʌsəlmən/ MUSS-əl-mən; born June 16, 1998) is an American water polo player and a 3 time Olympian (Paris, Tokyo and Rio). Maddie was named Woman's water polo MVP after her USA Team won gold in Tokyo at the 2020 Summer Olympics. She was one of the highest leading scorers with 18 goals. It is the fourth time in her career that she has been named the MVP of a major international tournament as she was named the MVP of the FINA World League Super Final in 2019 and again in 2021. She was also named the MVP of the FINA World Championships in 2017 where Team USA won gold; scored 16 goals in six games, including hat trick in 13–6 final-round win over Spain. At UCLA was a four-time First-Team All-American and four-time MPSF First-Team selection. In 2021 and 2022 was Women's Total Player of the Year by (Total Waterpolo).

Maddie was also part of the gold medal-winning American team at the 2016 Summer Olympics. She was the second-leading goal scorer of the US team in the event with 12 goals and named to the Olympic All-Star Team.

Musselman won gold with Team USA at the 2015 FINA World Championships in Kazan, Russia, and at the Pan American Games in Toronto.

Maddie finished her UCLA career with the most goals scored with 252. She was nominated for the Sullivan and Cutino award in 2022. She was named MPSF 2022 Player of the Year and 2017 Mountain Pacific Sports Federation Newcomer of the Year after she won a conference-record seven Newcomer of the Week awards.

== Personal life ==
Musselman is the daughter of former Major League Baseball pitcher Jeff Musselman.

In 2023, Musselman married UCLA Water Polo alumnus and open water swimmer, Patrick Woepse in a private ceremony in Newport Beach, California. Leading up to the Olympics, Woepse was diagnosed with a rare lung cancer which Musselman cited as a source for motivation to compete in the Paris Olympics.

== Awards ==
- Water polo at the 2017 FINA World Championships – Women's tournament: Tournament MVP
- Water polo at the 2022 FINA World Championships – Women's tournament: Most Valuable Player in Final

== See also ==
- United States women's Olympic water polo team records and statistics
- List of Olympic champions in women's water polo
- List of Olympic medalists in water polo (women)
- List of world champions in women's water polo
- List of World Aquatics Championships medalists in water polo
