= Paige Hauschild =

American water polo player (born 1999)

Personal information
- Nationality: American
- Born: August 17, 1999 (age 27) Santa Barbara, California
- Education: U. Southern Cal
- Height: 1.80 m (5 ft 11 in)
- Weight: 175 lb (79 kg)

Sport
- Country: United States
- Sport: Water Polo
- Position: Driver
- College team: U. Southern California (USC)
- Club: Santa Barbara 805
- Coached by: Cathy Neushul (Santa Barbara 805); Jovan Vavic, Marko Pintaric (USC); Adam Krikorian (Olympics)
Medal record
Representing United States
Olympic Games
Gold medal – first place	2020 Tokyo	Team
World Championships
Gold medal – first place	2017 Budapest	Team
Gold medal – first place	2019 Gwangju	Team
World Cup
Gold medal – first place	2026 Sydney

Paige Hauschild (born August 17, 1999) is an American water polo player, who competed for the University of Southern California and was a member of the United States women's national water polo team that won a gold medal at the 2020 Tokyo Summer Olympics. Showing consistent strength on the international stage, the 2020 gold medal was the U.S. Women's water polo team's third successive Olympic gold medal, having captured the gold in both 2012 and 2016.

== Early life ==
Hauschild was born August 17, 1999, in Santa Barbara, California, to Jenni and Dwayne Hauschild. From an athletic family, her father Dwayne played volleyball for Long Beach State, brother Shane competed for UC Santa Barbara's water polo team, and brother Ben competed in water polo for San José State. Paige attended San Marco High School, where she was a standout on their women's water polo team under Coach Brian Roth, becoming an All-CIF honoree on First team three-times during her high school career. She led San Marcos High to the 2017 Division I finals, and was voted the Female Athlete of the Year for her High School in three successive years. In addition to High School competition, Hauschild was active with the Santa Barbara Water Polo club coached by Cathy Neushul.

== University of Southern California ==
Hauschild attended the University of Southern California, where she majored in communication. She took off much of what would have been her Junior year in 2020 to train with the U.S. National team. At USC, she was coached by Jovan Vavic through 2019, and then by Marko Pintaric from 2020-2023. An accomplished coach, Pintaric was the 2021 National Women's Coach of the Year. An outstanding team contributor, in her Freshman and Sophomore years, she was a finalist for the Peter J. Cutino Award given to the nation's top water polo player. In a collegiate career highlight, Hauschild was instrumental in leading USC women's water polo to the 2018 NCAA Championship, and was a three time All-American. As a strong scorer for both USC and the U.S. National team, Hauschild played Driver, scoring well on outside shots, helping with assists, and playing well nearer the goal on both offense and defense.

== International competition ==
In international competition, Hauschild was part of the U.S. team that won a gold medal in the 2017 World Championship in Budapest, and another gold in the 2019 World Championship in Grangju, where Hauschild scored a total of seven goals.

== 2020 Tokyo Olympic gold medal ==
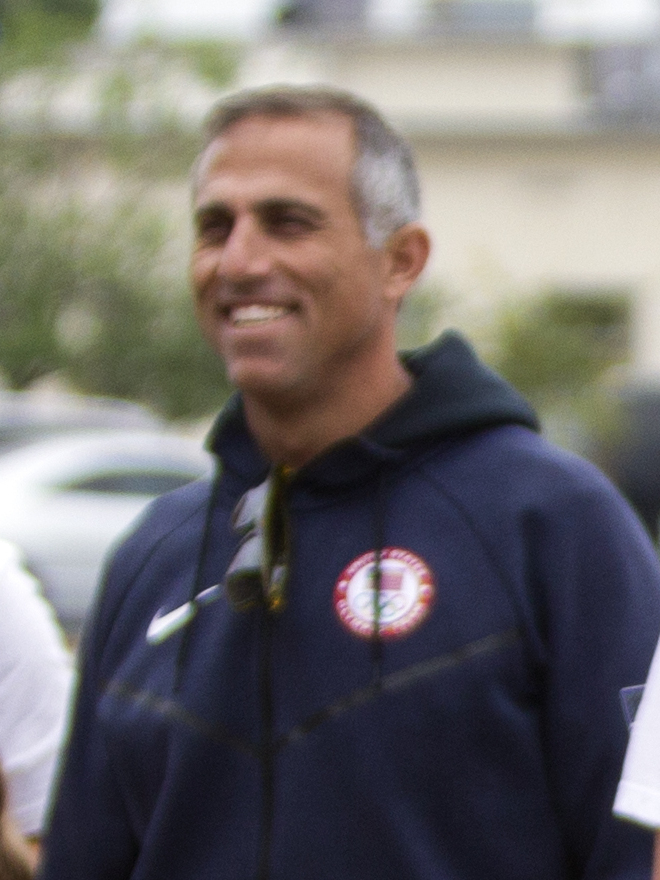
Coach Krikorian

Hauschild participated in the water polo team competition at the 2020 Tokyo Summer Olympics, under the U.S. women's water polo team's Olympic head coach Adam Krikorian. Krikorian had played for UCLA, and had established successful record coaching UCLA women's water polo. In 2020, the United States was a pre-Olympic favorite to win the gold medal, as they had won the two previous Olympic medals in 2012 and 2016 under Krikorian, as well as winning the 2015, 2017, and 2019 World Championships.

In final competition, the U.S. women's team won a gold medal, defeating Spain 14-5 in the gold medal round. An essential contributor to the U.S. team, Hauschild scored 6 goals at the 2020 Olympic Games. Strong in the late rounds, the U.S. Women had previously won both their quarter-final and semi-final rounds, while Spain beat the strong women's teams from China and Hungary to also move to the final round. In early rounds, in an upset, the U.S. women had lost to Hungary, a country with a strong tradition in men's water polo.

With gold medal wins in both 2012, and 2016, the U.S. team were strong pre-Olympic favorites to repeat as gold medal winners. As noted earlier, the women's team from Spain took the silver, and Hungary, a strong team, took the bronze, their first Olympic medal. Unlike the women's team, the Hungary's men's Olympic water polo team had won a record number of prior Olympic medals.
