= Olga Lupinogina =

Russian water polo player

Personal information
- Nationality: Russian
- Born: 27 August 1993 (age 32)
- Height: 1.69 m (5 ft 7 in)
- Weight: 60 kg (132 lb)

Sport
- Country: Russia
- Sport: Water polo
Medal record
Women's Water polo
Representing Russia
Olympic Games
Bronze medal – third place	2016 Rio de Janeiro	Team
World Championships
Bronze medal – third place	2017 Budapest	Team
European Championships
Silver medal – second place	2020 Budapest	Team
Universiade
Bronze medal – third place	2011 Shenzhen	Team

Olga Konstantinovna Lupinogina (Russian: Ольга Константиновна Лупиногина, née Belova, first marriage Gorbunova; born 27 August 1993) is a Russian water polo player. At the 2012 Summer Olympics, she competed for the Russia women's national water polo team in the women's event.

== See also ==
- List of Olympic medalists in water polo (women)
- List of World Aquatics Championships medalists in water polo
