= Kiley Neushul =

American water polo player (born 1993)

Personal information
- Full name: Kiley Susan Neushul
- Nationality: American
- Born: March 5, 1993 (age 33) Goleta, California, U.S.
- Height: 5 ft 8 in (1.73 m)

Sport
- Country: United States
- Sport: Water polo
Medal record
Olympic Games
Gold medal – first place	2016 Rio de Janeiro	Team
World Championships
Gold medal – first place	2015 Kazan	Team
Gold medal – first place	2017 Budapest	Team
Gold medal – first place	2019 Gwangju	Team
Pan American Games
Gold medal – first place	2015 Toronto	Team
Gold medal – first place	2019 Lima	Team
Universiade
Gold medal – first place	2017 Taipei	Team

Kiley Susan Neushul (born March 5, 1993) is an American water polo player and a graduate of Stanford University.

Neushul was selected as one of 13 players who represented the US and won a gold medal at the 2016 Summer Olympics. She was also a part of the gold medal-winning American team at the 2015 World Aquatics Championships, the 2017 World Aquatics Championships, and the 2019 World Aquatics Championships.

== Early life ==
Neushul grew up in Isla Vista, California, with her parents Peter and Cathy and two younger sisters Jamie and Ryann. All three sisters played water polo growing up, and her mother Cathy is now the technical director for Santa Barbara 805. Neushul played for Santa Barbara Aquatics from 1999 to 2011, helping her team to the Club Championships title in 2011 and was named an All-American for women's opens in 2011.

Neushul attended Dos Pueblos High School, graduating in 2011. She led the girls water polo team to four straight CIF Southern Section titles (Division II in 2008, Division I from 2009–11) and 67 straight wins. She was named the Southern Section Player of the Year all four years at Dos Pueblos.

== Collegiate career ==
Neushul continued on to play water polo at Stanford University from 2012-15 earning a degree in Communications. She played two of her four years with her younger sister, Jamie.

She won three National Championships for the Cardinal and was named the Peter J. Cutino award winner as a freshman in 2012 and as a senior in 2015. She was named the ACWPC Player of the Year and MPSF Newcomer of the Year at Stanford. Neushul was named a First-Team All-American three of her four years at Stanford and graduated finishing third in Stanford history with 220 career goals.

== Senior National Team ==
Neushul has been a part of the USA National Team pipeline since 2009 first playing with the Junior Team until 2014. She was named an alternate for the Senior Team at the 2010 FINA World Cup in Christchurch, New Zealand while on the Junior Team.

In 2013, Neushul moved up to the Senior Team with her first official competition at the FINA World Cup Qualifiers, the Holiday Cup, and FINA World Championships. She scored 7 goals in helping Team USA to bronze at 2013 FINA World League Super Final. In 2014, Neushul scored 9 goals helping Team USA to gold at 2014 FINA World Cup. She led team in scoring with 12 goals on way to gold at the FINA World League Super Final. In 2015, she recorded 8 goals during Team USA's win at 2015 FINA World Championship and posted 7 goals at Team USA's win for 2015 Pan American Games.

In 2016, Neushul trained and competed for Team USA. She led team with 12 goals twice in 2016 FINA World League Super Final, and the FINA Intercontinental Tournament (a gold medal finish). She tallied 18 goals en route to Team USA's qualification tournament for the 2016 Olympic Games. In July, Neushul was named to the final 13 team roster for the 2016 Summer Olympics; Team USA would win gold at the games with Neushul scoring 10 goals throughout the tournament.

In 2017, Neushul was named to the roster for Team USA for the FINA World Championships winning gold. Neushul was named the MVP of gold medal game, and finished third on team with 13 goals. She would be named to the FINA World League Super Final roster also winning gold, with a team leading 13 goals. In 2018, Neushul tallied 6 goals at 2018 FINA World Cup, and recorded 5 goals at 2018 FINA World League Super Final.

In 2019, Neushul tallied 9 goals at 2019 Pan American Games in Lima. She scored 10 goals at 2019 FINA World Championships in Gwangju, helping Team USA qualify for the Tokyo Olympic Games. She then recorded 6 goals at 2019 FINA World League Super Final and second on Team USA with 12 goals at 2019 FINA Intercontinental Tournament.

== Professional career ==
Neushul competed for C.N. Sabadell in Spain from 2016-2019. While competing for CN Sabadell, the team won League Champions while being named the European Final Four Champions in 2019.

== See also ==
- United States women's Olympic water polo team records and statistics
- List of Olympic champions in women's water polo
- List of Olympic medalists in water polo (women)
- List of world champions in women's water polo
- List of World Aquatics Championships medalists in water polo
