= Russia at the 2017 World Aquatics Championships =

- Flag of Russia
- World Aquatics code: RUS
- National federation: All Russian Swimming Federation
- Website: www.russwimming.ru

in Budapest, Hungary
- Competitors: 91 in 6 sports
- Medals Ranked 3rd: Gold 11 Silver 6 Bronze 8 Total 25

World Aquatics Championships appearances
- 1994; 1998; 2001; 2003; 2005; 2007; 2009; 2011; 2013; 2015; 2017; 2019; 2022–2025

Other related appearances
- Soviet Union (1973–1991)

Russia competed at the 2017 World Aquatics Championships in Budapest, Hungary from 14 July to 30 July.

== Medalists ==
Medal	Name	Sport	Event	Date
Gold	Svetlana Kolesnichenko	Synchronized swimming	Solo technical routine	July 15
Gold	Evgeny Kuznetsov; Ilya Zakharov	Diving	Men's 3 m synchronized springboard	July 15
Gold	Svetlana Kolesnichenko; Alexandra Patskevich	Synchronized swimming	Duet technical routine	July 16
Gold	Anastasia Arkhipovskaya; Anastasia Bayandina; Daria Bayandina; Vlada Chigireva; Maryna Goliadkina; Veronika Kalinina; Polina Komar; Maria Shurochkina; Varvara Subbotina; Darina Valitova	Synchronized swimming	Team technical routine	July 18
Gold	Svetlana Kolesnichenko	Synchronized swimming	Solo free routine	July 19
Gold	Svetlana Kolesnichenko; Alexandra Patskevich	Synchronized swimming	Duet free routine	July 20
Gold	Anastasiia Arkhipovskaia; Anastasia Bayandina; Daria Bayandina; Vlada Chigireva; Maryna Goliadkina; Veronika Kalinina; Polina Komar; Maria Shurochkina; Varvara Subbotina; Darina Valitova	Synchronized swimming	Team technical routine	July 21
Gold	Mikhaela Kalancha; Aleksandr Maltsev	Synchronized swimming	Mixed duet free routine	July 22
Gold	Evgeny Rylov	Swimming	Men's 200 m backstroke	July 28
Gold	Yuliya Yefimova	Swimming	Women's 200 m breaststroke	July 28
Gold	Anton Chupkov	Swimming	Men's 200 m breaststroke	July 28
Silver	Nadezhda Bazhina	Diving	Women's 1 m springboard	July 15
Silver	Mikhaela Kalancha; Aleksandr Maltsev	Synchronized swimming	Mixed duet technical routine	July 17
Silver	Aleksandr Bondar; Viktor Minibaev	Diving	Men's 10 m synchronized platform	July 17
Silver	Mikhail Dovgalyuk; Danila Izotov; Alexander Krasnykh; Nikita Lobintsev*; Mikhail Vekovishchev	Swimming	Men's 4 × 200 m freestyle relay	July 28
Silver	Yuliya Yefimova	Swimming	Women's 50 m breaststroke	July 30
Silver	Svetlana Chimrova; Natalia Ivaneeva*; Veronika Popova; Yuliya Yefimova; Anastasia Zuyeva	Swimming	Women's 4 × 100 m medley relay	July 30
Bronze	Nadezhda Bazhina; Kristina Ilinykh	Diving	Women's 3 m synchronized springboard	July 17
Bronze	Ilya Zakharov	Diving	Men's 3 metre springboard	July 20
Bronze	Evgeny Drattsev	Open water swimming	Men's 25 km	July 21
Bronze	Kirill Prigoda	Swimming	Men's 100 m breaststroke	July 24
Bronze	Yuliya Yefimova	Swimming	Women's 100 m breaststroke	July 25
Bronze	Alexander Krasnykh	Swimming	Men's 200 m freestyle	July 25
Bronze	Russia women's national water polo team: Anastasia Verkhoglyadova; Veronika Vakhitova; Ekaterina Prokofyeva; Elvina Karimova; Maria Borisova; Olga Gorbunova; Alena Serzhantova; Anastasia Simanovich; Anna Timofeeva; Tatiana Tolkunova; Evgeniya Ivanova; Daria Ryzhkova; Anna Karnaukh	Water polo	Women's tournament	July 28
Bronze	Anton Chupkov*; Danila Izotov*; Vladimir Morozov; Daniil Pakhomov*; Alexander Popkov; Kirill Prigoda; Evgeny Rylov; Grigory Tarasevich*	Swimming	Men's 4 × 100 m medley relay	July 30

== Diving ==
Russia has entered 12 divers (six male and six female).

Men

Athlete	Event	Preliminaries		Semifinals		Final	
Athlete	Event	Points	Rank	Points	Rank	Points	Rank
Ilya Molchanov	1 m springboard	373.70	7 Q	—N/a		122.10	11
Nikita Shleikher	1 m springboard	360.05	13	—N/a		Did not advance	
Evgeny Kuznetsov	3 m springboard	423.85	12 Q	464.75	7 Q	458.70	8
Ilya Zakharov	3 m springboard	502.30	2 Q	471.30	6 Q	505.90	3rd place, bronze medalist(s)
Aleksandr Bondar	10 m platform	436.30	10 Q	509.10	1 Q	484.80	4
Viktor Minibaev	10 m platform	466.30	5 Q	463.40	8 Q	463.60	8
Evgeny Kuznetsov; Ilya Zakharov	3 m synchronized springboard	436.86	2 Q	—N/a		450.30	1st place, gold medalist(s)
Aleksandr Bondar; Viktor Minibaev	10 m synchronized platform	415.02	4 Q	—N/a		458.85	2nd place, silver medalist(s)

Women

Athlete	Event	Preliminaries		Semifinals		Final	
Athlete	Event	Points	Rank	Points	Rank	Points	Rank
Nadezhda Bazhina	1 m springboard	254.10	10 Q	—N/a		304.70	2nd place, silver medalist(s)
Maria Polyakova	1 m springboard	260.80	6 Q	—N/a		289.05	5
Kristina Ilinykh	3 m springboard	317.85	4 Q	311.90	7 Q	319.40	7
Maria Polyakova	3 m springboard	288.75	11 Q	294.60	11 Q	299.20	9
Anna Chuinyshena	10 m platform	287.05	20	Did not advance			
Yulia Timoshinina	10 m platform	281.75	22	Did not advance			
Nadezhda Bazhina; Kristina Ilinykh	3 m synchronized springboard	304.80	3 Q	—N/a		312.60	3rd place, bronze medalist(s)
Valeria Belova; Yulia Timoshinina	10 m synchronized platform	290.04	7 Q	—N/a		291.96	8

Mixed

Athlete	Event	Final	
Athlete	Event	Points	Rank
Maria Polyakova; Ilya Molchanov	3 m synchronized springboard	270.63	9
Yulia Timoshinina; Viktor Minibaev	10 m synchronized platform	310.08	4
Yulia Timoshinina; Evgeny Kuznetsov	Team	335.60	11

== High diving ==
Russia qualified three male high divers.

Athlete	Event	Points	Rank
Nikita Fedotov	Men's high diving	231.25	13
Igor Semashko	Men's high diving	204.15	19
Artem Silchenko	Men's high diving	229.30	15

== Open water swimming ==
Russia has entered eight open water swimmers

Athlete	Event	Time	Rank
Kirill Abrosimov	Men's 5 km	54:45.9	4
Kirill Abrosimov	Men's 10 km	1:52:35.50	19
Kirill Belyaev	Men's 5 km	55:29.9	32
Kirill Abrosimov	Men's 25 km	1:52:35.5	19
Evgeny Drattsev	Men's 10 km	1:52:10.10	8
Evgeny Drattsev	Men's 25 km	5:02:49.80	3rd place, bronze medalist(s)
Valeriia Ermakova	Women's 5 km	1:00:51.9	14
Valeriia Ermakova	Women's 25 km	5:45:13.90	17
Mariya Novikova	Women's 5 km	1:02:03.1	35
Anastasiya Krapyvina	Women's 10 km	2:01:55.2	15
Anastasiya Krapyvina	Women's 25 km	5:24:03.70	6
Daria Kulik	Women's 10 km	2:07:18.0	33
Valeria Ermakova; Mariya Novikova; Kirill Abrosimov; Kirill Belyaev	Mixed team	55:55.1	10

== Swimming ==
Russian swimmers have achieved qualifying standards in the following events (up to a maximum of 2 swimmers in each event at the A-standard entry time, and 1 at the B-standard):

Men

Athlete	Event	Heat		Semifinal		Final	
Athlete	Event	Time	Rank	Time	Rank	Time	Rank
Anton Chupkov	200 m breaststroke	2:08.23	1 Q	2:07.14 CR	1 Q	2:06.96 CR	1st place, gold medalist(s)
Mikhail Dovgalyuk	200 m freestyle	1:46.47	3 Q	1:45.74	6 Q	1:46.02	7
Ilya Druzhinin	800 m freestyle	8:00.27	18	—N/a		Did not advance	
Ilya Druzhinin	1500 m freestyle	15:03.05	13	—N/a		Did not advance	
Danila Izotov	100 m freestyle	48.56	=9 Q	48.78	15	Did not advance	
Ilya Khomenko	200 m breaststroke	2:10.43	14 Q	2:08.58	6 Q	2:09.18	7
Kliment Kolesnikov	50 m backstroke	25.23	17	Did not advance			
Kliment Kolesnikov	100 m backstroke	54.51	16 Q	53.84	=9	Did not advance	
Kliment Kolesnikov	200 m backstroke	1:56.74	4 Q	1:55.15 WJ	4 Q	1:55.14 WJ	4
Oleg Kostin	50 m butterfly	23.68	17	Did not advance			
Alexander Krasnykh	200 m freestyle	1:46.51	5 Q	1:45.47	5 Q	1:45.23	3rd place, bronze medalist(s)
Alexander Krasnykh	400 m freestyle	3:47.35	13	—N/a		Did not advance	
Vladimir Morozov	50 m freestyle	21.72	4 Q	21.45	2 Q	21.46	4
Vladimir Morozov	100 m freestyle	48.99	24	Did not advance			
Daniil Pakhomov	100 m butterfly	52.47	23	Did not advance			
Daniil Pakhomov	200 m butterfly	1:56.07	9 Q	1:55.84	=10	Did not advance	
Alexander Popkov	100 m butterfly	51.84	14 Q	52.00	15	Did not advance	
Kirill Prigoda	50 m breaststroke	26.91	5 Q	26.85 NR	4 Q	27.01	7
Kirill Prigoda	100 m breaststroke	59.36 NR	6 Q	59.24 NR	8 Q	59.05 NR	3rd place, bronze medalist(s)
Kirill Prigoda	200 m individual medley	2:00.81	18	Did not advance			
Evgeny Rylov	200 m backstroke	1:57.28	7 Q	1:54.96	3 Q	1:53.61 EU	1st place, gold medalist(s)
Evgeny Sedov	50 m freestyle	22.20	17	Did not advance			
Evgeny Sedov	50 m butterfly	23.49	10 Q	23.72	16	Did not advance	
Grigory Tarasevich	50 m backstroke	24.88	8	Did not advance			
Grigory Tarasevich	100 m backstroke	53.18	3 Q	53.06	5 Q	53.12	5
Vsevolod Zanko	50 m breaststroke	27.39	16**	Did not advance			
Vsevolod Zanko	100 m breaststroke	59.56	8 Q	59.76	=13	Did not advance	
Nikita Korolev; Nikita Lobintsev; Vladimir Morozov; Alexander Popkov	4×100 m freestyle relay	3:13.84	6 Q	—N/a		3:12.58	4
Mikhail Dovgalyuk; Danila Izotov; Alexander Krasnykh; Nikita Lobintsev*; Mikhail Vekovishchev	4×200 m freestyle relay	7:07.21	3 Q	—N/a		7:02.68	2nd place, silver medalist(s)
Anton Chupkov*; Danila Izotov*; Vladimir Morozov; Daniil Pakhomov*; Alexander Popkov; Kirill Prigoda; Evgeny Rylov; Grigory Tarasevich*	4×100 m medley relay	3:32.12	3 Q	—N/a		3:29.76	3rd place, bronze medalist(s)

* Zanko tied for sixteenth place, but lost in a three-way swim-off to Slovenia's Peter John Stevens and did not advance.

Women

Athlete	Event	Heat		Semifinal		Final	
Athlete	Event	Time	Rank	Time	Rank	Time	Rank
Viktoriya Andreeva	200 m individual medley	2:13.16	17	Did not advance			
Svetlana Chimrova	50 m butterfly	26.49	18	Did not advance			
Svetlana Chimrova	100 m butterfly	57.85	8 Q	57.64	8 Q	57.24	7
Svetlana Chimrova	200 m butterfly	2:09.86	20	Did not advance			
Anastasia Guzhenkova	200 m freestyle	2:00.24	25	Did not advance			
Anastasia Guzhenkova	200 m butterfly	2:13.65	26	Did not advance			
Natalia Ivaneeva	50 m breaststroke	30.81	9 Q	30.82	11	Did not advance	
Natalia Ivaneeva	100 m breaststroke	1:07.97	21	Did not advance			
Rozaliya Nasretdinova	50 m freestyle	25.23	20	Did not advance			
Rozaliya Nasretdinova	100 m freestyle	56.34	32	Did not advance			
Arina Openysheva	400 m freestyle	4:15.45	19	—N/a		Did not advance	
Veronika Popova	200 m freestyle	1:57.06	8 Q	1:55.08 NR	3 Q	1:55.26	4
Veronika Popova	400 m freestyle	4:06.40	7 Q	—N/a		4:07.59	8
Daria Ustinova	50 m backstroke	28.73	30	Did not advance			
Daria Ustinova	100 m backstroke	59.90	10 Q	59.74	7 Q	59.50	6
Daria Ustinova	200 m backstroke	2:09.99	12 Q	2:07.08	4 Q	2:07.35	7
Yuliya Yefimova	50 m breaststroke	29.99	2 Q	29.73	2 Q	29.57	2nd place, silver medalist(s)
Yuliya Yefimova	100 m breaststroke	1:05.60	2 Q	1:04.36 NR	1 Q	1:05.05	3rd place, bronze medalist(s)
Yuliya Yefimova	200 m breaststroke	2:25.63	11 Q	2:21.49	1 Q	2:19.64	1st place, gold medalist(s)
Yuliya Yefimova	200 m individual medley	2:12.41	13 Q	2:12.88	14	Did not advance	
Anastasia Zuyeva	50 m backstroke	27.96	=10 Q	27.65	11	Did not advance	
Anastasia Zuyeva	100 m backstroke	59.58	4 Q	59.26	5 Q	58.83	5
Viktoriya Andreeva; Anastasia Guzhenkova*; Arina Openysheva; Veronika Popova; Daria Ustinova	4×200 m freestyle relay	7:55.67	6 Q	—N/a		7:48.59	4
Svetlana Chimrova; Natalia Ivaneeva*; Veronika Popova; Yuliya Yefimova; Anastasia Zuyeva	4×100 m medley relay	3:57.53	4 Q	—N/a		3:53.38	2nd place, silver medalist(s)

Mixed

Athlete	Event	Heat		Final	
Athlete	Event	Time	Rank	Time	Rank
Viktoriya Andreyeva; Danila Izotov; Nikita Korolev*; Aleksandr Popkov; Veronika Popova	4×100 m freestyle relay	3:26.94	7 Q	3:25.49 NR	7
Kliment Kolesnikov*; Kirill Prigoda; Grigory Tarasevich; Vsevolod Zanko*; Viktoriya Andreeva*; Svetlana Chimrova; Veronika Popova	4×100 m medley relay	3:46.09	5 Q	3:43.02	6

== Synchronized swimming ==
Russia's synchronized swimming team consisted of 14 athletes (1 male and 13 female).

Women

Athlete	Event	Preliminaries		Final	
Athlete	Event	Points	Rank	Points	Rank
Svetlana Kolesnichenko	Solo technical routine	94.0229	1 Q	95.2036	1st place, gold medalist(s)
Svetlana Kolesnichenko	Solo free routine	95.5000	1 Q	96.1333	1st place, gold medalist(s)
Svetlana Kolesnichenko; Alexandra Patskevich; Varvara Subbotina (R)	Duet technical routine	95.0062	1 Q	95.0515	1st place, gold medalist(s)
Svetlana Kolesnichenko; Alexandra Patskevich; Varvara Subbotina (R)	Duet free routine	96.6333	1 Q	97.0000	1st place, gold medalist(s)
Anastasia Arkhipovskaya (R); Anastasia Bayandina; Daria Bayandina; Vlada Chigireva; Maryna Goliadkina; Veronika Kalinina; Polina Komar; Maria Shurochkina; Varvara Subbotina (R); Darina Valitova	Team technical routine	95.0121	1 Q	96.0109	1st place, gold medalist(s)
Anastasia Arkhipovskaya (R); Anastasia Bayandina; Daria Bayandina; Vlada Chigireva; Maryna Goliadkina; Veronika Kalinina; Polina Komar; Maria Shurochkina; Varvara Subbotina (R); Darina Valitova	Team free routine	96.8000	1 Q	93.9333	1st place, gold medalist(s)

Mixed

Athlete	Event	Preliminaries		Final	
Athlete	Event	Points	Rank	Points	Rank
Mikhaela Kalancha; Aleksandr Maltsev	Duet technical routine	88.4847	1 Q	90.2639	2nd place, silver medalist(s)
Mikhaela Kalancha; Aleksandr Maltsev	Duet free routine	92.0000	1 Q	92.6000	1st place, gold medalist(s)

Legend: (R) = Reserve Athlete

== Water polo ==
=== Men's tournament ===
Team roster

- Vitaly Statsenko
- Nikolay Lazarev
- Egor Yasilyev
- Nikita Dereviankin
- Alexey Bugaychuk
- Artem Ashaev
- Daniil Merjulov
- Ivan Nagaev
- Ivan Suchkov
- Dmitrii Kholod
- Sergey Lisunov
- Roman Shepelev
- Victor Ivanov

Group play

Pos	Team	Pld	W	D	L	GF	GA	GD	Pts	Qualification
1	Croatia	3	3	0	0	38	21	+17	6	Quarterfinals
2	Russia	3	1	0	2	34	32	+2	2 (Note: Russia 2 Pts, +4 GD; Japan 2 Pts, +1 GD; United States 2 Pts, −5 GD)	Playoffs
3	Japan	3	1	0	2	29	38	−9	2	Playoffs
4	United States	3	1	0	2	28	38	−10	2	

Source: Sportresult
Rules for classification: 1) points; 2) head-to-head points; 3) head-to-head goal difference; 4) head-to-head number of goals scored; 5) better result against higher placed team.
Notes:

17 July 2017; 21:30	Report	Japan	8–15	Russia	Alfréd Hajós National Swimming Stadium, Budapest; Referees: Daniel Flahive (AUS), Stanko Ivanovski (MNE)
17 July 2017; 21:30	Report	Score by quarters: 1–5, 2–3, 2–3, 3–4			Alfréd Hajós National Swimming Stadium, Budapest; Referees: Daniel Flahive (AUS), Stanko Ivanovski (MNE)
17 July 2017; 21:30	Report	three players 2	Goals	four players 3	Alfréd Hajós National Swimming Stadium, Budapest; Referees: Daniel Flahive (AUS), Stanko Ivanovski (MNE)

19 July 2017; 13:30	Report	Russia	8–10	Croatia	Alfréd Hajós National Swimming Stadium, Budapest; Referees: Radoslaw Koryzna (POL), Frank Ohme (GER)
19 July 2017; 13:30	Report	Score by quarters: 3–1, 3–3, 1–4, 1–2			Alfréd Hajós National Swimming Stadium, Budapest; Referees: Radoslaw Koryzna (POL), Frank Ohme (GER)
19 July 2017; 13:30	Report	Lisunov 2	Goals	Joković 4	Alfréd Hajós National Swimming Stadium, Budapest; Referees: Radoslaw Koryzna (POL), Frank Ohme (GER)

21 July 2017; 12:10	Report	United States	14–11	Russia	Alfréd Hajós National Swimming Stadium, Budapest; Referees: Alessandro Severo (ITA), Matan Schwartz (ISR)
21 July 2017; 12:10	Report	Score by quarters: 6–1, 3–5, 3–1, 2–4			Alfréd Hajós National Swimming Stadium, Budapest; Referees: Alessandro Severo (ITA), Matan Schwartz (ISR)
21 July 2017; 12:10	Report	Bowen, Cupido 4	Goals	four players 2	Alfréd Hajós National Swimming Stadium, Budapest; Referees: Alessandro Severo (ITA), Matan Schwartz (ISR)

Playoffs

23 July 2017; 22:00	Report	Spain	10–11	Russia	Alfréd Hajós National Swimming Stadium, Budapest; Referees: Adrian Alexandrescu (ROU), Vojin Putniković (SRB)
23 July 2017; 22:00	Report	Score by quarters: 2–3, 2–4, 3–3, 3–1			Alfréd Hajós National Swimming Stadium, Budapest; Referees: Adrian Alexandrescu (ROU), Vojin Putniković (SRB)
23 July 2017; 22:00	Report	Tahull 4	Goals	Lisunov, Merkulov 3	Alfréd Hajós National Swimming Stadium, Budapest; Referees: Adrian Alexandrescu (ROU), Vojin Putniković (SRB)

Quarterfinals

25 July 2017; 20:30	Report	Hungary	14–5	Russia	Alfréd Hajós National Swimming Stadium, Budapest; Referees: Alessandro Severo (ITA), Francesc Buch (ESP)
25 July 2017; 20:30	Report	Score by quarters: 5–0, 3–1, 3–3, 3–1			Alfréd Hajós National Swimming Stadium, Budapest; Referees: Alessandro Severo (ITA), Francesc Buch (ESP)
25 July 2017; 20:30	Report	Hosnyánszky, Varga 4	Goals	Bugaychuk 2	Alfréd Hajós National Swimming Stadium, Budapest; Referees: Alessandro Severo (ITA), Francesc Buch (ESP)

5th–8th place semifinals

27 July 2017; 13:30	Report	Montenegro	9–8	Russia	Alfréd Hajós National Swimming Stadium, Budapest; Referees: Georgios Stavridis (GRE), Radosław Koryzna (POL)
27 July 2017; 13:30	Report	Score by quarters: 1–1, 4–2, 2–4, 2–1			Alfréd Hajós National Swimming Stadium, Budapest; Referees: Georgios Stavridis (GRE), Radosław Koryzna (POL)
27 July 2017; 13:30	Report	Dr. Brguljan 4	Goals	Lisunov, Merkulov 2	Alfréd Hajós National Swimming Stadium, Budapest; Referees: Georgios Stavridis (GRE), Radosław Koryzna (POL)

Seventh place game

29 July 2017; 12:00	Report	Russia	7–10	Australia	Alfréd Hajós National Swimming Stadium, Budapest; Referees: Stanko Ivanovski (MNE), Frank Ohme (GER)
29 July 2017; 12:00	Report	Score by quarters: 3–4, 2–2, 1–3, 1–1			Alfréd Hajós National Swimming Stadium, Budapest; Referees: Stanko Ivanovski (MNE), Frank Ohme (GER)
29 July 2017; 12:00	Report	Kholod 3	Goals	Younger 2	Alfréd Hajós National Swimming Stadium, Budapest; Referees: Stanko Ivanovski (MNE), Frank Ohme (GER)

=== Women's tournament ===
Team roster

- Anastasia Verkhoglyadova
- Veronika Vakhitova
- Ekaterina Prokofyeva
- Elvina Karimova
- Maria Borisova
- Olga Gorbunova
- Alena Serzhantova
- Anastasia Simanovich
- Anna Timofeeva
- Tatiana Tolkunova
- Evgeniya Ivanova
- Daria Ryzhkova
- Anna Karnaukh

Group play

Pos	Team	Pld	W	D	L	GF	GA	GD	Pts	Qualification
1	Greece	3	2	0	1	37	22	+15	4 (Note: Greece 2 Pts, +1 GD; Australia 2 Pts, 0 GD; Russia 2 Pts, −1 GD)	Quarterfinals
2	Australia	3	2	0	1	32	20	+12	4	Playoffs
3	Russia	3	2	0	1	29	21	+8	4	Playoffs
4	Kazakhstan	3	0	0	3	15	50	−35	0	

Source: Sportresult
Rules for classification: 1) points; 2) head-to-head points; 3) head-to-head goal difference; 4) head-to-head number of goals scored; 5) Goal difference.
Notes:

16 July 2017; 21:30	Report	Russia	9–7	Greece	Alfréd Hajós National Swimming Stadium, Budapest; Referees: Francesc Buch (ESP), Adrian Alexandrescu (ROU)
16 July 2017; 21:30	Report	Score by quarters: 2–1, 4–3, 2–3, 1–0			Alfréd Hajós National Swimming Stadium, Budapest; Referees: Francesc Buch (ESP), Adrian Alexandrescu (ROU)
16 July 2017; 21:30	Report	Karimova, Simanovich 3	Goals	three players 2	Alfréd Hajós National Swimming Stadium, Budapest; Referees: Francesc Buch (ESP), Adrian Alexandrescu (ROU)

18 July 2017; 17:30	Report	Australia	8–5	Russia	Alfréd Hajós National Swimming Stadium, Budapest; Referees: Alessandro Severo (ITA), Francesc Buch (ESP)
18 July 2017; 17:30	Report	Score by quarters: 1–2, 2–1, 3–1, 2–1			Alfréd Hajós National Swimming Stadium, Budapest; Referees: Alessandro Severo (ITA), Francesc Buch (ESP)
18 July 2017; 17:30	Report	three players 2	Goals	Borisova 2	Alfréd Hajós National Swimming Stadium, Budapest; Referees: Alessandro Severo (ITA), Francesc Buch (ESP)

20 July 2017; 12:10	Report	Russia	15–6	Kazakhstan	Alfréd Hajós National Swimming Stadium, Budapest; Referees: Natacha Florestano (BRA), Mikhail Dykman (CAN)
20 July 2017; 12:10	Report	Score by quarters: 5–1, 3–2, 4–2, 3–1			Alfréd Hajós National Swimming Stadium, Budapest; Referees: Natacha Florestano (BRA), Mikhail Dykman (CAN)
20 July 2017; 12:10	Report	Simanovich 3	Goals	Mirshina 3	Alfréd Hajós National Swimming Stadium, Budapest; Referees: Natacha Florestano (BRA), Mikhail Dykman (CAN)

Playoffs

22 July 2017; 20:30	Report	Netherlands	10–11	Russia	Alfréd Hajós National Swimming Stadium, Budapest; Referees: Georgios Stavridis (GRE), Daniel Flahive (AUS)
22 July 2017; 20:30	Report	Score by quarters: 2–4, 4–3, 2–3, 2–1			Alfréd Hajós National Swimming Stadium, Budapest; Referees: Georgios Stavridis (GRE), Daniel Flahive (AUS)
22 July 2017; 20:30	Report	Stomphorst 3	Goals	Prokofyeva 3	Alfréd Hajós National Swimming Stadium, Budapest; Referees: Georgios Stavridis (GRE), Daniel Flahive (AUS)

Quarterfinals

24 July 2017; 14:50	Report	Italy	8–9	Russia	Alfréd Hajós National Swimming Stadium, Budapest; Referees: Georgios Stavridis (GRE), Adrian Alexandrescu (ROU)
24 July 2017; 14:50	Report	Score by quarters: 0–3, 4–1, 3–3, 1–2			Alfréd Hajós National Swimming Stadium, Budapest; Referees: Georgios Stavridis (GRE), Adrian Alexandrescu (ROU)
24 July 2017; 14:50	Report	Emmolo 3	Goals	Ivanova 3	Alfréd Hajós National Swimming Stadium, Budapest; Referees: Georgios Stavridis (GRE), Adrian Alexandrescu (ROU)

Semifinals

26 July 2017; 20:30	Report	Russia	9–14	United States	Alfréd Hajós National Swimming Stadium, Budapest; Referees: Adrian Alexandrescu (ROU), Vojin Putniković (SRB)
26 July 2017; 20:30	Report	Score by quarters: 4–5, 1–6, 2–2, 2–1			Alfréd Hajós National Swimming Stadium, Budapest; Referees: Adrian Alexandrescu (ROU), Vojin Putniković (SRB)
26 July 2017; 20:30	Report	Prokofyeva 3	Goals	Fattal 5	Alfréd Hajós National Swimming Stadium, Budapest; Referees: Adrian Alexandrescu (ROU), Vojin Putniković (SRB)

Third place game

28 July 2017; 15:00	Report	Russia	11–9	Canada	Alfréd Hajós National Swimming Stadium, Budapest; Referees: Péter Molnár (HUN), Vojin Putniković (SRB)
28 July 2017; 15:00	Report	Score by quarters: 3–3, 4–2, 2–2, 2–2			Alfréd Hajós National Swimming Stadium, Budapest; Referees: Péter Molnár (HUN), Vojin Putniković (SRB)
28 July 2017; 15:00	Report	Ryzhkova 3	Goals	Eggens 4	Alfréd Hajós National Swimming Stadium, Budapest; Referees: Péter Molnár (HUN), Vojin Putniković (SRB)
