= Anastasia Simanovich =

Russian water polo player

Personal information
- Full name: Anastasia Dmitrievna Simanovich
- Nationality: Russia
- Born: 23 January 1995 (age 31) Kirishi, Russia
- Height: 1.74 m (5 ft 9 in)
- Weight: 69 kg (152 lb)

Sport
- Sport: Water polo
- Position: Centre back
- Current club: Kinef Kirishi
Medal record
Olympic Games
| Bronze medal – third place | 2016 Rio de Janeiro | Team |
World Championships
| Bronze medal – third place | 2017 Budapest | Team |
European Championships
| Silver medal – second place | 2020 Budapest |

Anastasia Dmitrievna Simanovich (Russian: Анастасия Дмитриевна Симанович; born 23 January 1995) is a Russian water polo player.

She was part of the Russian team at the 2015 World Aquatics Championships. She participated in the 2016 Summer Olympics.

== See also ==
- List of Olympic medalists in water polo (women)
- List of World Aquatics Championships medalists in water polo
