= Water polo at the 2017 World Aquatics Championships – Women's tournament =

Tournament details
- Country: Hungary
- City: Budapest
- Venue: Alfréd Hajós National Swimming Stadium
- Dates: 16 July 2017– 28 July 2017
- Teams: 16 (from 5 confederations)

Final positions
- Champions: USA (5th title)
- Runners-up: ESP
- Third place: RUS
- Fourth place: CAN

Tournament statistics
- Matches played: 48
- Goals scored: 929 (19.35 per match)
- Top scorer: (Italy) Roberta Bianconi (20 goals)

Awards
- Best player: (United States) Maddie Musselman

Official website
- fina-budapest2017.com

The women's water polo tournament at the 2017 World Aquatics Championships, organised by the FINA, was held in Budapest, Hungary from 16 to 28 July 2017.

The United States captured their fifth title by defeating Spain 13–6 in the final match. Bronze was secured by Russia who beat Canada 11–9.

== Participating teams ==
Africa

- South Africa

Americas

- Brazil
- Canada
- United States

Asia

- China
- Japan
- Kazakhstan

Europe

- France
- Greece
- Hungary
- Italy
- Netherlands
- Russia
- Spain

Oceania

- Australia
- New Zealand

=== Qualification ===
- Hungary qualified as host.
- United States and Spain qualified at the 2016 World League.
- Italy, Russia, Australia and China qualified at the 2016 Olympic tournament.
- France, Greece and the Netherlands qualified at the 2016 European Championship.
- Brazil and Canada qualified at the 2015 Pan American Games.
- Japan and Kazakhstan qualified at the Asian tournament.
- South Africa qualified at the African tournament.
- New Zealand qualified at the Oceanian tournament.

== Preliminary round ==
=== Group A ===
All times are CEST (UTC+2).

Pos	Team	Pld	W	D	L	GF	GA	GD	Pts	Qualification
1	Italy	3	3	0	0	43	16	+27	6	Quarterfinals
2	Canada	3	2	0	1	29	24	+5	4	Playoffs
3	China	3	1	0	2	27	28	−1	2	Playoffs
4	Brazil	3	0	0	3	14	45	−31	0	

Source: Sportresult
Rules for classification: 1) points; 2) head-to-head points; 3) head-to-head goal difference; 4) head-to-head number of goals scored; 5) Goal difference.

16 July 2017; 09:30	Report	Italy	10–4	Canada	Alfréd Hajós National Swimming Stadium, Budapest; Referees: Sergey Naumov (RUS), Benjamin Mercier (FRA)
16 July 2017; 09:30	Report	Score by quarters: 1–2, 2–0, 3–0, 4–2			Alfréd Hajós National Swimming Stadium, Budapest; Referees: Sergey Naumov (RUS), Benjamin Mercier (FRA)
16 July 2017; 09:30	Report	Bianconi 4	Goals	Eggens 2	Alfréd Hajós National Swimming Stadium, Budapest; Referees: Sergey Naumov (RUS), Benjamin Mercier (FRA)

16 July 2017; 10:50	Report	Brazil	4–11	China	Alfréd Hajós National Swimming Stadium, Budapest; Referees: Daniel Flahive (AUS), Frank Ohme (GER)
16 July 2017; 10:50	Report	Score by quarters: 2–4, 0–2, 2–1, 0–4			Alfréd Hajós National Swimming Stadium, Budapest; Referees: Daniel Flahive (AUS), Frank Ohme (GER)
16 July 2017; 10:50	Report	four players 1	Goals	Zhang C. 3	Alfréd Hajós National Swimming Stadium, Budapest; Referees: Daniel Flahive (AUS), Frank Ohme (GER)

18 July 2017; 18:50	Report	China	8–9	Canada	Alfréd Hajós National Swimming Stadium, Budapest; Referees: Adrian Alexandrescu (ROU), Vojin Putniković (SRB)
18 July 2017; 18:50	Report	Score by quarters: 1–1, 4–2, 0–5, 3–1			Alfréd Hajós National Swimming Stadium, Budapest; Referees: Adrian Alexandrescu (ROU), Vojin Putniković (SRB)
18 July 2017; 18:50	Report	Xiong, Zhang J. 2	Goals	four players 2	Alfréd Hajós National Swimming Stadium, Budapest; Referees: Adrian Alexandrescu (ROU), Vojin Putniković (SRB)

18 July 2017; 21:30	Report	Italy	18–4	Brazil	Alfréd Hajós National Swimming Stadium, Budapest; Referees: Matan Schwartz (ISR), Viktor Salnichenko (KAZ)
18 July 2017; 21:30	Report	Score by quarters: 5–1, 6–1, 4–1, 3–1			Alfréd Hajós National Swimming Stadium, Budapest; Referees: Matan Schwartz (ISR), Viktor Salnichenko (KAZ)
18 July 2017; 21:30	Report	Emmolo, Palmieri 4	Goals	Zablith 2	Alfréd Hajós National Swimming Stadium, Budapest; Referees: Matan Schwartz (ISR), Viktor Salnichenko (KAZ)

20 July 2017; 13:30	Report	Italy	15–8	China	Alfréd Hajós National Swimming Stadium, Budapest; Referees: Sergey Naumov (RUS), Georgios Stavridis (GRE)
20 July 2017; 13:30	Report	Score by quarters: 3–2, 4–2, 6–0, 2–4			Alfréd Hajós National Swimming Stadium, Budapest; Referees: Sergey Naumov (RUS), Georgios Stavridis (GRE)
20 July 2017; 13:30	Report	Aiello, Palmieri 3	Goals	Chen 3	Alfréd Hajós National Swimming Stadium, Budapest; Referees: Sergey Naumov (RUS), Georgios Stavridis (GRE)

20 July 2017; 17:30	Report	Brazil	6–16	Canada	Alfréd Hajós National Swimming Stadium, Budapest; Referees: Daniel Daners (URU), Benjamin Mercier (FRA)
20 July 2017; 17:30	Report	Score by quarters: 2–4, 1–4, 1–4, 1–4			Alfréd Hajós National Swimming Stadium, Budapest; Referees: Daniel Daners (URU), Benjamin Mercier (FRA)
20 July 2017; 17:30	Report	Ferreira 3	Goals	Christmas 5	Alfréd Hajós National Swimming Stadium, Budapest; Referees: Daniel Daners (URU), Benjamin Mercier (FRA)

=== Group B ===
All times are CEST (UTC+2).

Pos	Team	Pld	W	D	L	GF	GA	GD	Pts	Qualification
1	United States	3	3	0	0	58	17	+41	6	Quarterfinals
2	Spain	3	2	0	1	35	17	+18	4	Playoffs
3	New Zealand	3	1	0	2	17	38	−21	2	Playoffs
4	South Africa	3	0	0	3	11	49	−38	0	

Source: Sportresult
Rules for classification: 1) points; 2) head-to-head points; 3) head-to-head goal difference; 4) head-to-head number of goals scored; 5) Goal difference.

16 July 2017; 12:10	Report	New Zealand	2–10	Spain	Alfréd Hajós National Swimming Stadium, Budapest; Referees: Viktor Salnichenko (KAZ), Péter Molnár (HUN)
16 July 2017; 12:10	Report	Score by quarters: 0–3, 1–1, 0–2, 1–4			Alfréd Hajós National Swimming Stadium, Budapest; Referees: Viktor Salnichenko (KAZ), Péter Molnár (HUN)
16 July 2017; 12:10	Report	Lopes da Silva, Mason 1	Goals	Leitón 3	Alfréd Hajós National Swimming Stadium, Budapest; Referees: Viktor Salnichenko (KAZ), Péter Molnár (HUN)

16 July 2017; 13:30	Report	South Africa	2–24	United States	Alfréd Hajós National Swimming Stadium, Budapest; Referees: Diego Garibaldi (ARG), Daniel Daners (URU)
16 July 2017; 13:30	Report	Score by quarters: 0–6, 0–7, 2–5, 0–6			Alfréd Hajós National Swimming Stadium, Budapest; Referees: Diego Garibaldi (ARG), Daniel Daners (URU)
16 July 2017; 13:30	Report	Barrett, Penney 1	Goals	J. Neushul 6	Alfréd Hajós National Swimming Stadium, Budapest; Referees: Diego Garibaldi (ARG), Daniel Daners (URU)

18 July 2017; 09:30	Report	United States	12–8	Spain	Alfréd Hajós National Swimming Stadium, Budapest; Referees: Diana Dutilh-Dumas (NED), Sergey Naumov (RUS)
18 July 2017; 09:30	Report	Score by quarters: 6–1, 1–2, 2–2, 3–3			Alfréd Hajós National Swimming Stadium, Budapest; Referees: Diana Dutilh-Dumas (NED), Sergey Naumov (RUS)
18 July 2017; 09:30	Report	Musselman, J. Neushul 3	Goals	A. Espar 3	Alfréd Hajós National Swimming Stadium, Budapest; Referees: Diana Dutilh-Dumas (NED), Sergey Naumov (RUS)

18 July 2017; 10:50	Report	New Zealand	8–6	South Africa	Alfréd Hajós National Swimming Stadium, Budapest; Referees: Diego Garibaldi (ARG), Benjamin Mercier (FRA)
18 July 2017; 10:50	Report	Score by quarters: 2–1, 1–2, 1–1, 4–2			Alfréd Hajós National Swimming Stadium, Budapest; Referees: Diego Garibaldi (ARG), Benjamin Mercier (FRA)
18 July 2017; 10:50	Report	Hudson, Mason 3	Goals	Schooling 2	Alfréd Hajós National Swimming Stadium, Budapest; Referees: Diego Garibaldi (ARG), Benjamin Mercier (FRA)

20 July 2017; 18:50	Report	New Zealand	7–22	United States	Alfréd Hajós National Swimming Stadium, Budapest; Referees: Diego Garibaldi (ARG), Yosuke Kajiwarra (JPN)
20 July 2017; 18:50	Report	Score by quarters: 2–6, 1–6, 2–6, 2–4			Alfréd Hajós National Swimming Stadium, Budapest; Referees: Diego Garibaldi (ARG), Yosuke Kajiwarra (JPN)
20 July 2017; 18:50	Report	Pye, Stoneman 2	Goals	Steffens 5	Alfréd Hajós National Swimming Stadium, Budapest; Referees: Diego Garibaldi (ARG), Yosuke Kajiwarra (JPN)

20 July 2017; 21:30	Report	South Africa	3–17	Spain	Alfréd Hajós National Swimming Stadium, Budapest; Referees: Diana Dutilh-Dumas (NED), Viktor Salnichenko (KAZ)
20 July 2017; 21:30	Report	Score by quarters: 1–4, 0–6, 1–2, 1–5			Alfréd Hajós National Swimming Stadium, Budapest; Referees: Diana Dutilh-Dumas (NED), Viktor Salnichenko (KAZ)
20 July 2017; 21:30	Report	three players 1	Goals	Forca 5	Alfréd Hajós National Swimming Stadium, Budapest; Referees: Diana Dutilh-Dumas (NED), Viktor Salnichenko (KAZ)

=== Group C ===
All times are CEST (UTC+2).

Pos	Team	Pld	W	D	L	GF	GA	GD	Pts	Qualification
1	Hungary (H)	3	3	0	0	54	24	+30	6	Quarterfinals
2	Netherlands	3	2	0	1	45	20	+25	4	Playoffs
3	France	3	1	0	2	16	49	−33	2	Playoffs
4	Japan	3	0	0	3	27	49	−22	0	

Source: Sportresult
Rules for classification: 1) points; 2) head-to-head points; 3) head-to-head goal difference; 4) head-to-head number of goals scored; 5) Goal difference.
(H) Hosts

16 July 2017; 17:30	Report	Netherlands	17–2	France	Alfréd Hajós National Swimming Stadium, Budapest; Referees: Natacha Florestano (BRA), Ni Shiwei (CHN)
16 July 2017; 17:30	Report	Score by quarters: 7–0, 5–0, 3–1, 2–1			Alfréd Hajós National Swimming Stadium, Budapest; Referees: Natacha Florestano (BRA), Ni Shiwei (CHN)
16 July 2017; 17:30	Report	Klaassen 4	Goals	Mahieu, Millot 1	Alfréd Hajós National Swimming Stadium, Budapest; Referees: Natacha Florestano (BRA), Ni Shiwei (CHN)

16 July 2017; 20:10	Report	Japan	11–20	Hungary	Alfréd Hajós National Swimming Stadium, Budapest; Referees: Steven Rotsart (USA), Alessandro Severo (ITA)
16 July 2017; 20:10	Report	Score by quarters: 1–4, 3–8, 2–5, 5–3			Alfréd Hajós National Swimming Stadium, Budapest; Referees: Steven Rotsart (USA), Alessandro Severo (ITA)
16 July 2017; 20:10	Report	Arima, Yamamoto 4	Goals	Bujka 5	Alfréd Hajós National Swimming Stadium, Budapest; Referees: Steven Rotsart (USA), Alessandro Severo (ITA)

18 July 2017; 12:10	Report	Japan	8–20	Netherlands	Alfréd Hajós National Swimming Stadium, Budapest; Referees: Mikhail Dykman (CAN), Michael Brooks (NZL)
18 July 2017; 12:10	Report	Score by quarters: 0–7, 5–3, 2–5, 1–5			Alfréd Hajós National Swimming Stadium, Budapest; Referees: Mikhail Dykman (CAN), Michael Brooks (NZL)
18 July 2017; 12:10	Report	Arima 3	Goals	van der Sloot 6	Alfréd Hajós National Swimming Stadium, Budapest; Referees: Mikhail Dykman (CAN), Michael Brooks (NZL)

18 July 2017; 20:10	Report	France	5–24	Hungary	Alfréd Hajós National Swimming Stadium, Budapest; Referees: Natacha Florestano (BRA), Ni Shiwei (CHN)
18 July 2017; 20:10	Report	Score by quarters: 0–7, 2–7, 3–6, 0–4			Alfréd Hajós National Swimming Stadium, Budapest; Referees: Natacha Florestano (BRA), Ni Shiwei (CHN)
18 July 2017; 20:10	Report	Millot 2	Goals	three players 4	Alfréd Hajós National Swimming Stadium, Budapest; Referees: Natacha Florestano (BRA), Ni Shiwei (CHN)

20 July 2017; 09:30	Report	Japan	8–9	France	Alfréd Hajós National Swimming Stadium, Budapest; Referees: Radosław Koryzna (POL), Francesc Buch (ESP)
20 July 2017; 09:30	Report	Score by quarters: 3–3, 0–3, 3–1, 2–2			Alfréd Hajós National Swimming Stadium, Budapest; Referees: Radosław Koryzna (POL), Francesc Buch (ESP)
20 July 2017; 09:30	Report	Inaba 3	Goals	Millot 4	Alfréd Hajós National Swimming Stadium, Budapest; Referees: Radosław Koryzna (POL), Francesc Buch (ESP)

20 July 2017; 20:10	Report	Netherlands	8–10	Hungary	Alfréd Hajós National Swimming Stadium, Budapest; Referees: Alessandro Severo (ITA), Steven Rotsart (USA)
20 July 2017; 20:10	Report	Score by quarters: 2–2, 1–1, 2–4, 3–3			Alfréd Hajós National Swimming Stadium, Budapest; Referees: Alessandro Severo (ITA), Steven Rotsart (USA)
20 July 2017; 20:10	Report	Smit 4	Goals	three players 2	Alfréd Hajós National Swimming Stadium, Budapest; Referees: Alessandro Severo (ITA), Steven Rotsart (USA)

=== Group D ===
All times are CEST (UTC+2).

Pos	Team	Pld	W	D	L	GF	GA	GD	Pts	Qualification
1	Greece	3	2	0	1	37	22	+15	4 (Note: Greece 2 Pts, +1 GD; Australia 2 Pts, 0 GD; Russia 2 Pts, −1 GD)	Quarterfinals
2	Australia	3	2	0	1	32	20	+12	4	Playoffs
3	Russia	3	2	0	1	29	21	+8	4	Playoffs
4	Kazakhstan	3	0	0	3	15	50	−35	0	

Source: Sportresult
Rules for classification: 1) points; 2) head-to-head points; 3) head-to-head goal difference; 4) head-to-head number of goals scored; 5) Goal difference.
Notes:

16 July 2017; 18:50	Report	Australia	16–4	Kazakhstan	Alfréd Hajós National Swimming Stadium, Budapest; Referees: Mikhail Dykman (CAN), Dion Willis (RSA)
16 July 2017; 18:50	Report	Score by quarters: 4–1, 4–1, 4–2, 4–0			Alfréd Hajós National Swimming Stadium, Budapest; Referees: Mikhail Dykman (CAN), Dion Willis (RSA)
16 July 2017; 18:50	Report	Webster 5	Goals	Zakirova 2	Alfréd Hajós National Swimming Stadium, Budapest; Referees: Mikhail Dykman (CAN), Dion Willis (RSA)

16 July 2017; 21:30	Report	Russia	9–7	Greece	Alfréd Hajós National Swimming Stadium, Budapest; Referees: Francesc Buch (ESP), Adrian Alexandrescu (ROU)
16 July 2017; 21:30	Report	Score by quarters: 2–1, 4–3, 2–3, 1–0			Alfréd Hajós National Swimming Stadium, Budapest; Referees: Francesc Buch (ESP), Adrian Alexandrescu (ROU)
16 July 2017; 21:30	Report	Karimova, Simanovich 3	Goals	three players 2	Alfréd Hajós National Swimming Stadium, Budapest; Referees: Francesc Buch (ESP), Adrian Alexandrescu (ROU)

18 July 2017; 13:30	Report	Greece	19–5	Kazakhstan	Alfréd Hajós National Swimming Stadium, Budapest; Referees: Daniel Daners (URU), Stanko Ivanovski (MNE)
18 July 2017; 13:30	Report	Score by quarters: 5–0, 4–2, 4–1, 6–2			Alfréd Hajós National Swimming Stadium, Budapest; Referees: Daniel Daners (URU), Stanko Ivanovski (MNE)
18 July 2017; 13:30	Report	Asimaki 4	Goals	Akilbayeva 3	Alfréd Hajós National Swimming Stadium, Budapest; Referees: Daniel Daners (URU), Stanko Ivanovski (MNE)

18 July 2017; 17:30	Report	Australia	8–5	Russia	Alfréd Hajós National Swimming Stadium, Budapest; Referees: Alessandro Severo (ITA), Francesc Buch (ESP)
18 July 2017; 17:30	Report	Score by quarters: 1–2, 2–1, 3–1, 2–1			Alfréd Hajós National Swimming Stadium, Budapest; Referees: Alessandro Severo (ITA), Francesc Buch (ESP)
18 July 2017; 17:30	Report	three players 2	Goals	Borisova 2	Alfréd Hajós National Swimming Stadium, Budapest; Referees: Alessandro Severo (ITA), Francesc Buch (ESP)

20 July 2017; 10:50	Report	Australia	8–11	Greece	Alfréd Hajós National Swimming Stadium, Budapest; Referees: Adrian Alexandrescu (ROU), Vojin Putniković (SRB)
20 July 2017; 10:50	Report	Score by quarters: 2–2, 3–3, 2–3, 1–3			Alfréd Hajós National Swimming Stadium, Budapest; Referees: Adrian Alexandrescu (ROU), Vojin Putniković (SRB)
20 July 2017; 10:50	Report	Gofers 3	Goals	Asimaki, E. Plevritou 3	Alfréd Hajós National Swimming Stadium, Budapest; Referees: Adrian Alexandrescu (ROU), Vojin Putniković (SRB)

20 July 2017; 12:10	Report	Russia	15–6	Kazakhstan	Alfréd Hajós National Swimming Stadium, Budapest; Referees: Natacha Florestano (BRA), Mikhail Dykman (CAN)
20 July 2017; 12:10	Report	Score by quarters: 5–1, 3–2, 4–2, 3–1			Alfréd Hajós National Swimming Stadium, Budapest; Referees: Natacha Florestano (BRA), Mikhail Dykman (CAN)
20 July 2017; 12:10	Report	Simanovich 3	Goals	Mirshina 3	Alfréd Hajós National Swimming Stadium, Budapest; Referees: Natacha Florestano (BRA), Mikhail Dykman (CAN)

== Knockout stage ==
Championship bracket

Playoffs
22 July
Russia	11
Netherlands	10
22 July
France	2
Australia	16
22 July
Canada	16
New Zealand	3
22 July
China	5
Spain	13

Quarterfinals
24 July
Russia	9
Italy	8
24 July
Australia	5
United States	7
24 July
Canada	6
Hungary	4
24 July
Greece	12
Spain	14

Semifinals
26 July
Russia	9
United States	14
26 July
Canada	10
Spain	12

Gold medal match
28 July
United States	13
Spain	6
Bronze medal match
28 July
Russia	11
Canada	9

5th place bracket

5th–8th place classification
26 July
Italy	18
Australia	17
26 July
Greece	9
Hungary	10

5th place match
28 July
Italy	8
Hungary	10
7th place match
28 July
Australia	6
Greece	8

9th place bracket

9th–12th place classification
24 July
Netherlands	19
New Zealand	4
24 July
France	5
China	13

9th place match
26 July
Netherlands	14
China	7
11th place match
26 July
New Zealand	7
France	9

13th place bracket

13th–16th place classification
22 July
Brazil	10
South Africa	5
22 July
Kazakhstan	8
Japan	17

13th place match
24 July
Brazil	9
Japan	11
15th place match
24 July
South Africa	4
Kazakhstan	6

=== Playoffs ===
All times are CEST (UTC+2).

22 July 2017; 17:30	Report	Canada	16–3	New Zealand	Alfréd Hajós National Swimming Stadium, Budapest; Referees: Natacha Florestano (BRA), Viktor Salnichenko (KAZ)
22 July 2017; 17:30	Report	Score by quarters: 5–1, 4–1, 3–0, 4–1			Alfréd Hajós National Swimming Stadium, Budapest; Referees: Natacha Florestano (BRA), Viktor Salnichenko (KAZ)
22 July 2017; 17:30	Report	Békhazi 4	Goals	three players 1	Alfréd Hajós National Swimming Stadium, Budapest; Referees: Natacha Florestano (BRA), Viktor Salnichenko (KAZ)

22 July 2017; 19:00	Report	China	5–13	Spain	Alfréd Hajós National Swimming Stadium, Budapest; Referees: Diana Dutilh-Dumas (NED), Steven Rotsart (USA)
22 July 2017; 19:00	Report	Score by quarters: 2–1, 1–4, 1–5, 1–3			Alfréd Hajós National Swimming Stadium, Budapest; Referees: Diana Dutilh-Dumas (NED), Steven Rotsart (USA)
22 July 2017; 19:00	Report	Zhao 2	Goals	B. Ortiz 4	Alfréd Hajós National Swimming Stadium, Budapest; Referees: Diana Dutilh-Dumas (NED), Steven Rotsart (USA)

22 July 2017; 20:30	Report	Netherlands	10–11	Russia	Alfréd Hajós National Swimming Stadium, Budapest; Referees: Georgios Stavridis (GRE), Daniel Flahive (AUS)
22 July 2017; 20:30	Report	Score by quarters: 2–4, 4–3, 2–3, 2–1			Alfréd Hajós National Swimming Stadium, Budapest; Referees: Georgios Stavridis (GRE), Daniel Flahive (AUS)
22 July 2017; 20:30	Report	Stomphorst 3	Goals	Prokofyeva 3	Alfréd Hajós National Swimming Stadium, Budapest; Referees: Georgios Stavridis (GRE), Daniel Flahive (AUS)

22 July 2017; 22:00	Report	France	2–16	Australia	Alfréd Hajós National Swimming Stadium, Budapest; Referees: Dion Willis (RSA), Mikhail Dykman (CAN)
22 July 2017; 22:00	Report	Score by quarters: 0–5, 0–4, 1–1, 1–6			Alfréd Hajós National Swimming Stadium, Budapest; Referees: Dion Willis (RSA), Mikhail Dykman (CAN)
22 July 2017; 22:00	Report	Millot, Battu 1	Goals	Arancini 4	Alfréd Hajós National Swimming Stadium, Budapest; Referees: Dion Willis (RSA), Mikhail Dykman (CAN)

=== Quarterfinals ===
All times are CEST (UTC+2).

24 July 2017; 14:50	Report	Italy	8–9	Russia	Alfréd Hajós National Swimming Stadium, Budapest; Referees: Georgios Stavridis (GRE), Adrian Alexandrescu (ROU)
24 July 2017; 14:50	Report	Score by quarters: 0–3, 4–1, 3–3, 1–2			Alfréd Hajós National Swimming Stadium, Budapest; Referees: Georgios Stavridis (GRE), Adrian Alexandrescu (ROU)
24 July 2017; 14:50	Report	Emmolo 3	Goals	Ivanova 3	Alfréd Hajós National Swimming Stadium, Budapest; Referees: Georgios Stavridis (GRE), Adrian Alexandrescu (ROU)

24 July 2017; 16:10	Report	United States	7–5	Australia	Alfréd Hajós National Swimming Stadium, Budapest; Referees: Francesc Buch (ESP), Frank Ohme (GER)
24 July 2017; 16:10	Report	Score by quarters: 0–0, 3–0, 2–2, 2–3			Alfréd Hajós National Swimming Stadium, Budapest; Referees: Francesc Buch (ESP), Frank Ohme (GER)
24 July 2017; 16:10	Report	Musselman, Raney 2	Goals	Gofers 4	Alfréd Hajós National Swimming Stadium, Budapest; Referees: Francesc Buch (ESP), Frank Ohme (GER)

24 July 2017; 20:30	Report	Hungary	4–6	Canada	Alfréd Hajós National Swimming Stadium, Budapest; Referees: Alessandro Severo (ITA), Steven Rotsart (USA)
24 July 2017; 20:30	Report	Score by quarters: 0–1, 4–3, 0–1, 0–1			Alfréd Hajós National Swimming Stadium, Budapest; Referees: Alessandro Severo (ITA), Steven Rotsart (USA)
24 July 2017; 20:30	Report	four players 1	Goals	Eggens 5	Alfréd Hajós National Swimming Stadium, Budapest; Referees: Alessandro Severo (ITA), Steven Rotsart (USA)

24 July 2017; 22:00	Report	Greece	12–14 (PSO)	Spain	Alfréd Hajós National Swimming Stadium, Budapest; Referees: Sergey Naumov (RUS), Vojin Putniković (SRB)
24 July 2017; 22:00	Report	Score by quarters: 3–2, 2–2, 2–2, 3–4 PSO: 2–4			Alfréd Hajós National Swimming Stadium, Budapest; Referees: Sergey Naumov (RUS), Vojin Putniković (SRB)
24 July 2017; 22:00	Report	Kotsia 3	Goals	B. Ortiz 4	Alfréd Hajós National Swimming Stadium, Budapest; Referees: Sergey Naumov (RUS), Vojin Putniković (SRB)

=== 13th–16th place classification ===
All times are CEST (UTC+2).

22 July 2017; 10:30	Report	Brazil	10–5	South Africa	Alfréd Hajós National Swimming Stadium, Budapest; Referees: Ni Shiwei (CHN), Daniel Daners (URU)
22 July 2017; 10:30	Report	Score by quarters: 3–1, 2–1, 3–1, 2–2			Alfréd Hajós National Swimming Stadium, Budapest; Referees: Ni Shiwei (CHN), Daniel Daners (URU)
22 July 2017; 10:30	Report	Abla 5	Goals	Hallendorff 2	Alfréd Hajós National Swimming Stadium, Budapest; Referees: Ni Shiwei (CHN), Daniel Daners (URU)

22 July 2017; 12:00	Report	Japan	17–8	Kazakhstan	Alfréd Hajós National Swimming Stadium, Budapest; Referees: Diego Garibaldi (ARG), Michael Brooks (NZL)
22 July 2017; 12:00	Report	Score by quarters: 3–1, 2–1, 7–4, 5–2			Alfréd Hajós National Swimming Stadium, Budapest; Referees: Diego Garibaldi (ARG), Michael Brooks (NZL)
22 July 2017; 12:00	Report	Arima, Sakanoue 4	Goals	Mirshina 4	Alfréd Hajós National Swimming Stadium, Budapest; Referees: Diego Garibaldi (ARG), Michael Brooks (NZL)

=== 9th–12th place classification ===
All times are CEST (UTC+2).

24 July 2017; 12:10	Report	New Zealand	4–19	Netherlands	Alfréd Hajós National Swimming Stadium, Budapest; Referees: Diego Garibaldi (ARG), Yosuke Kajiwara (JPN)
24 July 2017; 12:10	Report	Score by quarters: 1–5, 1–6, 1–3, 1–5			Alfréd Hajós National Swimming Stadium, Budapest; Referees: Diego Garibaldi (ARG), Yosuke Kajiwara (JPN)
24 July 2017; 12:10	Report	four players 1	Goals	four players 3	Alfréd Hajós National Swimming Stadium, Budapest; Referees: Diego Garibaldi (ARG), Yosuke Kajiwara (JPN)

24 July 2017; 13:30	Report	China	13–5	France	Alfréd Hajós National Swimming Stadium, Budapest; Referees: Natacha Florestano (BRA), Nader Ghafouri (IRI)
24 July 2017; 13:30	Report	Score by quarters: 3–2, 3–2, 4–1, 3–0			Alfréd Hajós National Swimming Stadium, Budapest; Referees: Natacha Florestano (BRA), Nader Ghafouri (IRI)
24 July 2017; 13:30	Report	Niu 3	Goals	Sacre 2	Alfréd Hajós National Swimming Stadium, Budapest; Referees: Natacha Florestano (BRA), Nader Ghafouri (IRI)

=== 5th–8th place classification ===
All times are CEST (UTC+2).

26 July 2017; 13:30	Report	Italy	18–17 (PSO)	Australia	Alfréd Hajós National Swimming Stadium, Budapest; Referees: Sergey Naumov (RUS), Steven Rotsart (USA)
26 July 2017; 13:30	Report	Score by quarters: 5–3, 2–3, 1–3, 3–2 PSO: 7–6			Alfréd Hajós National Swimming Stadium, Budapest; Referees: Sergey Naumov (RUS), Steven Rotsart (USA)
26 July 2017; 13:30	Report	Bianconi 5	Goals	Webster 4	Alfréd Hajós National Swimming Stadium, Budapest; Referees: Sergey Naumov (RUS), Steven Rotsart (USA)

26 July 2017; 15:00	Report	Hungary	10–9	Greece	Alfréd Hajós National Swimming Stadium, Budapest; Referees: Andrej Franulović (CRO), Benjamin Mercier (FRA)
26 July 2017; 15:00	Report	Score by quarters: 2–4, 1–2, 5–0, 2–3			Alfréd Hajós National Swimming Stadium, Budapest; Referees: Andrej Franulović (CRO), Benjamin Mercier (FRA)
26 July 2017; 15:00	Report	Keszthelyi 3	Goals	Tsoukala 3	Alfréd Hajós National Swimming Stadium, Budapest; Referees: Andrej Franulović (CRO), Benjamin Mercier (FRA)

=== Semifinals ===
All times are CEST (UTC+2).

26 July 2017; 20:30	Report	Russia	9–14	United States	Alfréd Hajós National Swimming Stadium, Budapest; Referees: Adrian Alexandrescu (ROU), Vojin Putniković (SRB)
26 July 2017; 20:30	Report	Score by quarters: 4–5, 1–6, 2–2, 2–1			Alfréd Hajós National Swimming Stadium, Budapest; Referees: Adrian Alexandrescu (ROU), Vojin Putniković (SRB)
26 July 2017; 20:30	Report	Prokofyeva 3 Borisova, Simanovich 2 Ivanova, Ryzhkova 1	Goals	Fattal 5 Seidemann 4 Steffens 3 K. Neushul, Williams 1	Alfréd Hajós National Swimming Stadium, Budapest; Referees: Adrian Alexandrescu (ROU), Vojin Putniković (SRB)

26 July 2017; 22:00	Report	Canada	10–12	Spain	Alfréd Hajós National Swimming Stadium, Budapest; Referees: Georgios Stavridis (GRE), Alessandro Severo (ITA)
26 July 2017; 22:00	Report	Score by quarters: 2–4, 2–3, 2–2, 4–3			Alfréd Hajós National Swimming Stadium, Budapest; Referees: Georgios Stavridis (GRE), Alessandro Severo (ITA)
26 July 2017; 22:00	Report	Christmas, Fournier 3 Eggens 2 Wright, McKee 1	Goals	Gual 5 B. Ortiz 3 Bach, A. Espar, C. Espar, Leitón 1	Alfréd Hajós National Swimming Stadium, Budapest; Referees: Georgios Stavridis (GRE), Alessandro Severo (ITA)

=== 15th place match ===
All times are CEST (UTC+2).

24 July 2017; 09:30	Report	South Africa	4–6	Kazakhstan	Alfréd Hajós National Swimming Stadium, Budapest; Referees: Ni Shiwei (CHN), Benjamin Mercier (FRA)
24 July 2017; 09:30	Report	Score by quarters: 1–2, 2–2, 1–0, 0–2			Alfréd Hajós National Swimming Stadium, Budapest; Referees: Ni Shiwei (CHN), Benjamin Mercier (FRA)
24 July 2017; 09:30	Report	Smit 2	Goals	Akilbayeva 2	Alfréd Hajós National Swimming Stadium, Budapest; Referees: Ni Shiwei (CHN), Benjamin Mercier (FRA)

=== 13th place match ===
All times are CEST (UTC+2).

24 July 2017; 10:50	Report	Brazil	9–11	Japan	Alfréd Hajós National Swimming Stadium, Budapest; Referees: Daniel Daners (URU), Dion Willis (RSA)
24 July 2017; 10:50	Report	Score by quarters: 2–2, 2–6, 2–1, 3–2			Alfréd Hajós National Swimming Stadium, Budapest; Referees: Daniel Daners (URU), Dion Willis (RSA)
24 July 2017; 10:50	Report	Abla 4	Goals	Sakanoue 4	Alfréd Hajós National Swimming Stadium, Budapest; Referees: Daniel Daners (URU), Dion Willis (RSA)

=== 11th place match ===
All times are CEST (UTC+2).

26 July 2017; 10:30	Report	New Zealand	7–9	France	Alfréd Hajós National Swimming Stadium, Budapest; Referees: Diego Garibaldi (ARG), Yosuke Kajiwara (JPN)
26 July 2017; 10:30	Report	Score by quarters: 1–0, 2–2, 1–5, 3–2			Alfréd Hajós National Swimming Stadium, Budapest; Referees: Diego Garibaldi (ARG), Yosuke Kajiwara (JPN)
26 July 2017; 10:30	Report	Lopes da Silva, Mason 2	Goals	Daule, Guillet 2	Alfréd Hajós National Swimming Stadium, Budapest; Referees: Diego Garibaldi (ARG), Yosuke Kajiwara (JPN)

=== 9th place match ===
All times are CEST (UTC+2).

26 July 2017; 12:00	Report	Netherlands	14–7	China	Alfréd Hajós National Swimming Stadium, Budapest; Referees: Natacha Florestano (BRA), Dion Willis (RSA)
26 July 2017; 12:00	Report	Score by quarters: 2–2, 5–2, 2–1, 5–2			Alfréd Hajós National Swimming Stadium, Budapest; Referees: Natacha Florestano (BRA), Dion Willis (RSA)
26 July 2017; 12:00	Report	Nijhuis 4	Goals	three players 2	Alfréd Hajós National Swimming Stadium, Budapest; Referees: Natacha Florestano (BRA), Dion Willis (RSA)

=== 7th place match ===
All times are CEST (UTC+2).

28 July 2017; 12:00	Report	Australia	6–8	Greece	Alfréd Hajós National Swimming Stadium, Budapest; Referees: Natacha Florestano (BRA), Andrej Franulović (CRO)
28 July 2017; 12:00	Report	Score by quarters: 0–1, 1–4, 3–3, 2–0			Alfréd Hajós National Swimming Stadium, Budapest; Referees: Natacha Florestano (BRA), Andrej Franulović (CRO)
28 July 2017; 12:00	Report	six players 1	Goals	Tsoukala 3	Alfréd Hajós National Swimming Stadium, Budapest; Referees: Natacha Florestano (BRA), Andrej Franulović (CRO)

=== 5th place match ===
All times are CEST (UTC+2).

28 July 2017; 13:30	Report	Italy	8–10	Hungary	Alfréd Hajós National Swimming Stadium, Budapest; Referees: Steven Rotsart (USA), Francesc Buch (ESP)
28 July 2017; 13:30	Report	Score by quarters: 2–3, 2–3, 2–2, 2–2			Alfréd Hajós National Swimming Stadium, Budapest; Referees: Steven Rotsart (USA), Francesc Buch (ESP)
28 July 2017; 13:30	Report	Bianconi, Garibotti 4	Goals	Keszthelyi 3	Alfréd Hajós National Swimming Stadium, Budapest; Referees: Steven Rotsart (USA), Francesc Buch (ESP)

=== Bronze medal match ===
All times are CEST (UTC+2).

28 July 2017; 15:00	Report	Russia	11–9	Canada	Alfréd Hajós National Swimming Stadium, Budapest; Referees: Péter Molnár (HUN), Vojin Putniković (SRB)
28 July 2017; 15:00	Report	Score by quarters: 3–3, 4–2, 2–2, 2–2			Alfréd Hajós National Swimming Stadium, Budapest; Referees: Péter Molnár (HUN), Vojin Putniković (SRB)
28 July 2017; 15:00	Report	Ryzhkova 3 Prokofyeva, Borisova, Serzhantova 2 Karimova, Timofeeva 1	Goals	Eggens 4 Wright 3 Békhazi, McKelvey 1	Alfréd Hajós National Swimming Stadium, Budapest; Referees: Péter Molnár (HUN), Vojin Putniković (SRB)

=== Gold medal match ===
All times are CEST (UTC+2).

28 July 2017; 20:30	Report	United States	13–6	Spain	Alfréd Hajós National Swimming Stadium, Budapest; Referees: Diana Dutilh-Dumas (NED), Daniel Flahive (AUS)
28 July 2017; 20:30	Report	Score by quarters: 2–1, 3–2, 5–2, 3–1			Alfréd Hajós National Swimming Stadium, Budapest; Referees: Diana Dutilh-Dumas (NED), Daniel Flahive (AUS)
28 July 2017; 20:30	Report	K. Neushul 4 Musselman 3 Steffens 2 Seidemann, M. Fischer, Fattal, Raney 1	Goals	A. Espar 3 B. Ortiz 2 Leitón 1	Alfréd Hajós National Swimming Stadium, Budapest; Referees: Diana Dutilh-Dumas (NED), Daniel Flahive (AUS)

== Ranking and statistics ==
=== Final ranking ===
Rank	Team
1st place, gold medalist(s)	United States
2nd place, silver medalist(s)	Spain
3rd place, bronze medalist(s)	Russia
4	Canada
5	Hungary
6	Italy
7	Greece
8	Australia
9	Netherlands
10	China
11	France
12	New Zealand
13	Japan
14	Brazil
15	Kazakhstan
16	South Africa

2017 Women's Water Polo World champions

United States
Fifth title

Team Roster

Gabby Stone, Maddie Musselman, Melissa Seidemann, Rachel Fattal, Paige Hauschild, Maggie Steffens (C), Jordan Raney, Kiley Neushul, Aria Fischer, Jamie Neushul, Makenzie Fischer, Alys Williams, Amanda Longan. Head coach: Adam Krikorian.

=== Top goalscorers ===
Rank	Name	Goals	Shots	%
1	(Italy) Roberta Bianconi	20	47	43
2	(Canada) Monika Eggens	18	45	40
3	(Australia) Rowie Webster	17	42	41
4	(Hungary) Rita Keszthelyi	16	39	41
4	(Spain) Bea Ortiz	16	31	52
4	(United States) Maddie Musselman	16	48	33
7	(Japan) Yumi Arima	14	41	34
7	(United States) Rachel Fattal	14	23	61
7	(Australia) Keesja Gofers	14	28	50
7	(Netherlands) Sabrina van der Sloot	14	22	64

Source: SportResult

=== Awards ===
Most Valuable Player

- (United States) Maddie Musselman

Best Goalscorer

- (Italy) Roberta Bianconi – 20 goals

Media All-Star Team

- (Spain) Laura Ester – Goalkeeper
- (Spain) Paula Leitón – Centre forward
- (Italy) Roberta Bianconi
- (Canada) Monika Eggens
- (United States) Rachel Fattal
- (Hungary) Rita Keszthelyi
- (United States) Maddie Musselman
