= Veronika Vakhitova =

Russian water polo player

Personal information
- Full name: Veronika Valiullovna Vakhitova
- Nationality: Russia
- Born: 13 June 1998 (age 28) Moscow, Russia
- Height: 1.70 m (5 ft 7 in)

Sport
- Sport: Water polo
- Position: Centre back
- Current club: SKIF Moskomsport
Medal record
World Championships
Bronze medal – third place	2017 Budapest	Team
European Games
Gold medal – first place	2015 Baku	Team

Veronika Valiullovna Vakhitova (Russian: Вероника Валиулловна Вахитова; born 13 June 1998) is a Russian water polo player. She qualified for the 2020 Summer Olympics.

She was part of the Russian team at the 2017 World Aquatics Championships, 2018 FINA Women's Water Polo World League, and 2021 FINA Women's Water Polo World League
