= Maria Borisova (water polo) =

Russian water polo player

Personal information
- Nationality: Russian
- Born: 28 July 1997 (age 28)
- Height: 1.84 m (6 ft 0 in)
- Weight: 95 kg (209 lb)

Sport
- Country: Russia
- Sport: Water polo
Medal record
Olympic Games
Bronze medal – third place	2016 Rio de Janeiro	Team
World Championships
Bronze medal – third place	2017 Budapest	Team
European Championships
Silver medal – second place	2020 Budapest

Maria Olegovna Borisova (Russian: Мария Олеговна Борисова; born 28 July 1997) is a Russian female water polo player. She was part of the Russia women's national water polo team.

She competed at the 2014 Women's European Water Polo Championship, and the 2016 Summer Olympics.

She has played for traditional water polo club Ethnikos Piraeus in Greece. In 2023 she left Greece to play in italian championship for sicilian team Ekipe Orizzonte Catania

== See also ==
- List of Olympic medalists in water polo (women)
- List of World Aquatics Championships medalists in water polo
