= Rachel Fattal =

American water polo player (born 1993)

Personal information
- Full name: Rachel Ann Fattal
- Born: December 10, 1993 (age 32) Seal Beach, California, U.S.
- Height: 1.73 m (5 ft 8 in)

Sport
- Country: United States
- Sport: Water polo
- College team: University of California Los Angeles
- Coached by: Brandon Brooks
Medal record
Woman's water polo
Representing the United States
Olympic Games
Gold medal – first place	2016 Rio de Janeiro	Team
Gold medal – first place	2020 Tokyo	Team
World Championships
Gold medal – first place	2015 Kazan	Team
Gold medal – first place	2017 Budapest	Team
Gold medal – first place	2019 Gwangju	Team
Gold medal – first place	2022 Budapest	Team
Gold medal – first place	2024 Doha	Team
World Cup
Gold medal – first place	2023 Long Beach
Gold medal – first place	2026 Sydney

Rachel Ann Fattal (/fəˈtɑːl/ fə-TAHL; born December 10, 1993) is an American water polo player who competed for UCLA and won an Olympic gold medal in Water Polo at the 2016 Rio de Jainero and 2020 Tokyo Olympics.

Fattal was born December 10, 1993 in Seal Beach, California, and attended Los Alamitos High School, graduating in 2012. As a High School Senior at Alamitos in March, 2012, Fattal was named Player of the Year in her CIF Division.

== University of California Los Angeles ==
She then attended UCLA as a student athlete from 2013-15, and in 2017, taking time off to train for the Olympics. At UCLA, she majored in history and played water polo for Coach Brandon Brooks, while graduating in 2017. Brooks served as UCLA's Head Coach for Water Polo from 2007–2017, and had previously served as a goalkeeper for both UCLA and the U.S. Olympic team. A highly accomplished coach, Brooks had a record of 178-39 in his first seven seasons.

Recognized widely for her achievements in Water Polo during college, Fattal received first team All-American honors four times, and was an NCAA Finalist in 2017. In that year, she was a Cutino Award Finalist.

== Olympic gold medals ==
As previously noted, Fattal won an Olympic gold medal in Water Polo at both the 2016 Rio de Jainero Olympics and 2020 Tokyo Olympics. At the 2020 Paris Olympics, she competed with the Women's U.S. Water Polo team that placed fourth in competition.

=== International career ===
She was part of the American team that won the gold medal at the 2015 World Aquatics Championships, where she played in the driver position. She was also part of the gold medal-winning American team at the 2016 Summer Olympics. She was the top sprinter at the 2016 Olympics, with 17 sprints won.

== Awards ==
- Water polo at the 2015 FINA World Championships – Women's tournament: Most Valuable Player

== See also ==
- United States women's Olympic water polo team records and statistics
- List of Olympic champions in women's water polo
- List of Olympic medalists in water polo (women)
- List of world champions in women's water polo
- List of World Aquatics Championships medalists in water polo
