= Elvina Karimova =

Russian water polo player

Personal information
- Full name: Elvina Haydaryanovna Karimova
- Nationality: Russia
- Born: 25 March 1994 (age 32) Kusa, Chelyabinsk Oblast
- Height: 1.65 m (5 ft 5 in)
- Weight: 62 kg (137 lb)

Sport
- Sport: Water polo
- Position: Driver
- Current club: Uralochka Zlatoust
Medal record
Women's water polo
Representing Russia
Olympic Games
Bronze medal – third place	2016 Rio de Janeiro	Team
World Championships
Bronze medal – third place	2017 Budapest	Team
European Championships
Silver medal – second place	2020 Budapest
Universiade
Gold medal – first place	2013 Kazan	Team

Elvina Haydaryanovna Karimova (Russian: Эльвина Хайдарьяновна Каримова; born 25 March 1994) is a Russian water polo player of Tatar descent.

She was part of the Russian team at the 2015 World Aquatics Championships, and 2016 Summer Olympics.

== See also ==
- List of Olympic medalists in water polo (women)
- List of World Aquatics Championships medalists in water polo
