= Water polo at the 2015 World Aquatics Championships – Women's tournament =

2015 Women's Water Polo Tournament at World Aquatics Championship

Tournament details
- Venue: 1 (in 1 host city)
- Dates: 26 July – 7 August
- Teams: 16 (from 5 confederations)

Final positions
- Champions: United States (4th title)
- Runners-up: Netherlands
- Third place: Italy
- Fourth place: Australia

Tournament statistics
- Matches played: 48
- Goals scored: 883 (18.4 per match)
- Attendance: 45,888 (956 per match)
- Top scorer(s): (Hungary) Rita Keszthelyi (21 goals)

Awards
- Best player: (United States) Rachel Fattal

The women's water polo tournament at the 2015 World Aquatics Championships, organised by the FINA, was held in Kazan, Russia from 26 July to 7 August 2015.

== Participating teams ==
Africa

- South Africa

Americas

- Brazil
- Canada
- United States

Asia

- China
- Japan
- Kazakhstan

Europe

- France
- Greece
- Hungary
- Italy
- Netherlands
- Russia
- Spain

Oceania

- Australia
- New Zealand

== Format ==
The 16 teams were drawn into four groups of four teams and played a round-robin. The best placed team advances to the quarterfinal, while the second-and third best team advance to the playoffs. The last placed team will play in placement games for place 13–16. From the quarterfinals on, a knockout system will be used to determine the winner. The losers of the playoffs and quarterfinals will play in placement games to determine their final position.

== Preliminary round ==
=== Group A ===
All times are MSK (UTC+3).

Pos	Team	Pld	W	D	L	GF	GA	GD	Pts	Qualification
1	Spain	3	3	0	0	49	15	+34	6	Advanced to quarterfinals
2	Canada	3	2	0	1	38	22	+16	4	Advanced to playoffs
3	Kazakhstan	3	1	0	2	25	35	−10	2	Advanced to playoffs
4	New Zealand	3	0	0	3	12	52	−40	0	

Source: SportResult.com
Rules for classification: 1) points; 2) head-to-head points; 3) head-to-head goal difference; 4) head-to-head number of goals scored; 5) goal difference.

26 July 2015; 09:30	Report	Canada	15–6	New Zealand	Kazan; Attendance: 865; Referees: Fábio Toffoli (BRA), Tadao Tahara (JPN)
26 July 2015; 09:30	Report	Score by quarters: 5–1, 2–3, 4–2, 4–0			Kazan; Attendance: 865; Referees: Fábio Toffoli (BRA), Tadao Tahara (JPN)
26 July 2015; 09:30	Report	M. Eggens, Fournier 3	Goals	Myles 2	Kazan; Attendance: 865; Referees: Fábio Toffoli (BRA), Tadao Tahara (JPN)

26 July 2015; 10:50	Report	Kazakhstan	7–14	Spain	Kazan; Attendance: 993; Referees: Anne Grandin (FRA), Ni Shi Wei (CHN)
26 July 2015; 10:50	Report	Score by quarters: 0–4, 2–5, 1–1, 4–4			Kazan; Attendance: 993; Referees: Anne Grandin (FRA), Ni Shi Wei (CHN)
26 July 2015; 10:50	Report	Mirshina 3	Goals	Pareja 5	Kazan; Attendance: 993; Referees: Anne Grandin (FRA), Ni Shi Wei (CHN)

28 July 2015; 20:10	Report	Spain	23–2	New Zealand	Kazan; Attendance: 300; Referees: Ursula Wengenroth (SUI), Fábio Toffoli (BRA)
28 July 2015; 20:10	Report	Score by quarters: 3–0, 7–1, 5–1, 8–0			Kazan; Attendance: 300; Referees: Ursula Wengenroth (SUI), Fábio Toffoli (BRA)
28 July 2015; 20:10	Report	Tarragó 6	Goals	D. Lewis, Lopes Da Silva 1	Kazan; Attendance: 300; Referees: Ursula Wengenroth (SUI), Fábio Toffoli (BRA)

28 July 2015; 21:30	Report	Canada	17–4	Kazakhstan	Kazan; Attendance: 240; Referees: György Kun (HUN), Ni Shi Wei (CHN)
28 July 2015; 21:30	Report	Score by quarters: 4–1, 2–1, 3–2, 8–0			Kazan; Attendance: 240; Referees: György Kun (HUN), Ni Shi Wei (CHN)
28 July 2015; 21:30	Report	Eggens 5	Goals	Mirshina 2	Kazan; Attendance: 240; Referees: György Kun (HUN), Ni Shi Wei (CHN)

30 July 2015; 13:30	Report	Canada	6–12	Spain	Kazan; Attendance: 321; Referees: György Kun (HUN), Mark Koganov (AZE)
30 July 2015; 13:30	Report	Score by quarters: 1–5, 2–4, 2–2, 1–1			Kazan; Attendance: 321; Referees: György Kun (HUN), Mark Koganov (AZE)
30 July 2015; 13:30	Report	M. Eggens 2	Goals	Pareja 3	Kazan; Attendance: 321; Referees: György Kun (HUN), Mark Koganov (AZE)

30 July 2015; 17:30	Report	Kazakhstan	14–4	New Zealand	Kazan; Attendance: 985; Referees: Ursula Wengenroth (SUI), Tadao Tahara (JPN)
30 July 2015; 17:30	Report	Score by quarters: 3–0, 4–0, 4–1, 3–3			Kazan; Attendance: 985; Referees: Ursula Wengenroth (SUI), Tadao Tahara (JPN)
30 July 2015; 17:30	Report	Akilbayeva 6	Goals	D. Lewis 3	Kazan; Attendance: 985; Referees: Ursula Wengenroth (SUI), Tadao Tahara (JPN)

=== Group B ===
All times are MSK (UTC+3).

Pos	Team	Pld	W	D	L	GF	GA	GD	Pts	Qualification
1	Australia	3	3	0	0	35	14	+21	6	Advanced to quarterfinals
2	Netherlands	3	2	0	1	38	18	+20	4	Advanced to playoffs
3	Greece	3	1	0	2	36	22	+14	2	Advanced to playoffs
4	South Africa	3	0	0	3	6	61	−55	0	

Source: SportResult.com
Rules for classification: 1) points; 2) head-to-head points; 3) head-to-head goal difference; 4) head-to-head number of goals scored; 5) goal difference.

26 July 2015; 12:10	Report	Australia	8–7	Greece	Kazan; Attendance: 1,035; Referees: Massimiliano Caputi (ITA), Sergey Naumov (RUS)
26 July 2015; 12:10	Report	Score by quarters: 2–1, 1–3, 2–1, 3–2			Kazan; Attendance: 1,035; Referees: Massimiliano Caputi (ITA), Sergey Naumov (RUS)
26 July 2015; 12:10	Report	Zagame 2	Goals	Tsoukala 4	Kazan; Attendance: 1,035; Referees: Massimiliano Caputi (ITA), Sergey Naumov (RUS)

26 July 2015; 13:30	Report	South Africa	1–22	Netherlands	Kazan; Attendance: 1,049; Referees: German Moller (ARG), Ursula Wengenroth (SUI)
26 July 2015; 13:30	Report	Score by quarters: 1–6, 0–5, 0–3, 0–8			Kazan; Attendance: 1,049; Referees: German Moller (ARG), Ursula Wengenroth (SUI)
26 July 2015; 13:30	Report	Versfeld 1	Goals	Klaassen 6	Kazan; Attendance: 1,049; Referees: German Moller (ARG), Ursula Wengenroth (SUI)

28 July 2015; 09:30	Report	Netherlands	10–9	Greece	Kazan; Attendance: 280; Referees: Boris Margeta (SLO), Radosław Koryzna (POL)
28 July 2015; 09:30	Report	Score by quarters: 2–3, 2–2, 5–2, 1–2			Kazan; Attendance: 280; Referees: Boris Margeta (SLO), Radosław Koryzna (POL)
28 July 2015; 09:30	Report	Van der Sloot 4	Goals	Plevritou, Roumpesi 2	Kazan; Attendance: 280; Referees: Boris Margeta (SLO), Radosław Koryzna (POL)

28 July 2015; 10:50	Report	Australia	19–1	South Africa	Kazan; Attendance: 456; Referees: Anne Grandin (FRA), Tadao Tahara (JPN)
28 July 2015; 10:50	Report	Score by quarters: 6–0, 3–1, 7–0, 3–0			Kazan; Attendance: 456; Referees: Anne Grandin (FRA), Tadao Tahara (JPN)
28 July 2015; 10:50	Report	Southern 5	Goals	Versfeld 1	Kazan; Attendance: 456; Referees: Anne Grandin (FRA), Tadao Tahara (JPN)

30 July 2015; 20:10	Report	Australia	8–6	Netherlands	Kazan; Attendance: 230; Referees: Massimiliano Caputi (ITA), Boris Margeta (SLO)
30 July 2015; 20:10	Report	Score by quarters: 2–0, 2–2, 3–2, 1–2			Kazan; Attendance: 230; Referees: Massimiliano Caputi (ITA), Boris Margeta (SLO)
30 July 2015; 20:10	Report	Southern, Zagame 2	Goals	Sevenich 2	Kazan; Attendance: 230; Referees: Massimiliano Caputi (ITA), Boris Margeta (SLO)

30 July 2015; 21:30	Report	South Africa	4–20	Greece	Kazan; Attendance: 130; Referees: Anne Grandin (FRA), Ni Shi Wei (CHN)
30 July 2015; 21:30	Report	Score by quarters: 1–5, 1–6, 1–4, 1–5			Kazan; Attendance: 130; Referees: Anne Grandin (FRA), Ni Shi Wei (CHN)
30 July 2015; 21:30	Report	Versfeld, White 2	Goals	Asimaki 5	Kazan; Attendance: 130; Referees: Anne Grandin (FRA), Ni Shi Wei (CHN)

=== Group C ===
All times are MSK (UTC+3).

Pos	Team	Pld	W	D	L	GF	GA	GD	Pts	Qualification
1	Italy	3	3	0	0	40	18	+22	6	Advanced to quarterfinals
2	United States	3	2	0	1	39	14	+25	4	Advanced to playoffs
3	Brazil	3	1	0	2	19	36	−17	2	Advanced to playoffs
4	Japan	3	0	0	3	13	43	−30	0	

Source: SportResult.com
Rules for classification: 1) points; 2) head-to-head points; 3) head-to-head goal difference; 4) head-to-head number of goals scored; 5) goal difference.

26 July 2015; 17:30	Report	Brazil	2–13	United States	Kazan; Attendance: 1,880; Referees: Dion Willis (RSA), Viktor Salnichenko (KAZ)
26 July 2015; 17:30	Report	Score by quarters: 0–6, 0–3, 1–2, 1–2			Kazan; Attendance: 1,880; Referees: Dion Willis (RSA), Viktor Salnichenko (KAZ)
26 July 2015; 17:30	Report	Chiappini, Oliveira 1	Goals	Steffens 3	Kazan; Attendance: 1,880; Referees: Dion Willis (RSA), Viktor Salnichenko (KAZ)

26 July 2015; 20:10	Report	Japan	3–15	Italy	Kazan; Attendance: 2,286; Referees: Francesc Buch (ESP), Mark Koganov (AZE)
26 July 2015; 20:10	Report	Score by quarters: 0–5, 1–3, 2–2, 0–5			Kazan; Attendance: 2,286; Referees: Francesc Buch (ESP), Mark Koganov (AZE)
26 July 2015; 20:10	Report	three players 1	Goals	Garibotti, Tabani 3	Kazan; Attendance: 2,286; Referees: Francesc Buch (ESP), Mark Koganov (AZE)

28 July 2015; 12:10	Report	Italy	10–9	United States	Kazan; Attendance: 529; Referees: Georgios Stavridis (GRE), Cory Williams (NZL)
28 July 2015; 12:10	Report	Score by quarters: 4–2, 2–1, 2–4, 2–2			Kazan; Attendance: 529; Referees: Georgios Stavridis (GRE), Cory Williams (NZL)
28 July 2015; 12:10	Report	Bianconi 4	Goals	Fattal 5	Kazan; Attendance: 529; Referees: Georgios Stavridis (GRE), Cory Williams (NZL)

28 July 2015; 13:30	Report	Brazil	11–8	Japan	Kazan; Attendance: 543; Referees: Stephane Roy (CAN), Viktor Salnichenko (KAZ)
28 July 2015; 13:30	Report	Score by quarters: 4–2, 2–1, 4–3, 1–2			Kazan; Attendance: 543; Referees: Stephane Roy (CAN), Viktor Salnichenko (KAZ)
28 July 2015; 13:30	Report	Chiappini 5	Goals	Nakano 3	Kazan; Attendance: 543; Referees: Stephane Roy (CAN), Viktor Salnichenko (KAZ)

30 July 2015; 09:30	Report	Brazil	6–15	Italy	Kazan; Attendance: 617; Referees: Cory Williams (NZL), Viktor Salnichenko (KAZ)
30 July 2015; 09:30	Report	Score by quarters: 0–3, 1–5, 3–3, 2–4			Kazan; Attendance: 617; Referees: Cory Williams (NZL), Viktor Salnichenko (KAZ)
30 July 2015; 09:30	Report	Oliveira 4	Goals	Bianconi, Radicchi 3	Kazan; Attendance: 617; Referees: Cory Williams (NZL), Viktor Salnichenko (KAZ)

30 July 2015; 10:50	Report	Japan	2–17	United States	Kazan; Attendance: 729; Referees: Dion Willis (RSA), Vojin Putniković (SRB)
30 July 2015; 10:50	Report	Score by quarters: 0–4, 0–4, 1–6, 1–3			Kazan; Attendance: 729; Referees: Dion Willis (RSA), Vojin Putniković (SRB)
30 July 2015; 10:50	Report	Nakano 2	Goals	Steffens 4	Kazan; Attendance: 729; Referees: Dion Willis (RSA), Vojin Putniković (SRB)

=== Group D ===
All times are MSK (UTC+3).

Pos	Team	Pld	W	D	L	GF	GA	GD	Pts	Qualification
1	Russia	3	2	1	0	38	25	+13	5	Advanced to quarterfinals
2	China	3	2	1	0	31	21	+10	5	Advanced to playoffs
3	Hungary	3	1	0	2	37	25	+12	2	Advanced to playoffs
4	France	3	0	0	3	12	47	−35	0	

Source: SportResult.com
Rules for classification: 1) points; 2) head-to-head points; 3) head-to-head goal difference; 4) head-to-head number of goals scored; 5) goal difference.

26 July 2015; 18:50	Report	Russia	16–5	France	Kazan; Attendance: 2,164; Referees: Peter de Jong (NED), Stephane Roy (CAN)
26 July 2015; 18:50	Report	Score by quarters: 5–1, 3–2, 4–1, 4–1			Kazan; Attendance: 2,164; Referees: Peter de Jong (NED), Stephane Roy (CAN)
26 July 2015; 18:50	Report	Karimova, Prokofyeva 3	Goals	Guillet 3	Kazan; Attendance: 2,164; Referees: Peter de Jong (NED), Stephane Roy (CAN)

26 July 2015; 21:30	Report	Hungary	8–9	China	Kazan; Attendance: 200; Referees: Daniel Flahive (AUS), Nenad Peris (CRO)
26 July 2015; 21:30	Report	Score by quarters: 1–4, 4–1, 2–1, 1–3			Kazan; Attendance: 200; Referees: Daniel Flahive (AUS), Nenad Peris (CRO)
26 July 2015; 21:30	Report	Antal 2	Goals	Zhao Zihan 4	Kazan; Attendance: 200; Referees: Daniel Flahive (AUS), Nenad Peris (CRO)

28 July 2015; 17:30	Report	France	4–13	China	Kazan; Attendance: 1,700; Referees: Adrian Alexandrescu (ROU), Peter de Jong (NED)
28 July 2015; 17:30	Report	Score by quarters: 1–2, 1–0, 1–6, 1–5			Kazan; Attendance: 1,700; Referees: Adrian Alexandrescu (ROU), Peter de Jong (NED)
28 July 2015; 17:30	Report	Guillet 2	Goals	Niu Guannan 6	Kazan; Attendance: 1,700; Referees: Adrian Alexandrescu (ROU), Peter de Jong (NED)

28 July 2015; 18:50	Report	Hungary	11–13	Russia	Kazan; Attendance: 2,123; Referees: Nenad Peris (CRO), Joseph Peila (USA)
28 July 2015; 18:50	Report	Score by quarters: 3–1, 3–4, 4–3, 1–5			Kazan; Attendance: 2,123; Referees: Nenad Peris (CRO), Joseph Peila (USA)
28 July 2015; 18:50	Report	Keszthelyi 3	Goals	Lisunova 3	Kazan; Attendance: 2,123; Referees: Nenad Peris (CRO), Joseph Peila (USA)

30 July 2015; 12:10	Report	Hungary	18–3	France	Kazan; Attendance: 372; Referees: German Moller (ARG), Stanko Ivanovski (MNE)
30 July 2015; 12:10	Report	Score by quarters: 5–1, 1–1, 7–0, 5–1			Kazan; Attendance: 372; Referees: German Moller (ARG), Stanko Ivanovski (MNE)
30 July 2015; 12:10	Report	Bujka 6	Goals	Guillet 2	Kazan; Attendance: 372; Referees: German Moller (ARG), Stanko Ivanovski (MNE)

30 July 2015; 18:50	Report	Russia	9–9	China	Kazan; Attendance: 2,653; Referees: Georgios Stavridis (GRE), Joseph Peila (USA)
30 July 2015; 18:50	Report	Score by quarters: 3–2, 1–2, 3–2, 2–3			Kazan; Attendance: 2,653; Referees: Georgios Stavridis (GRE), Joseph Peila (USA)
30 July 2015; 18:50	Report	Karimova, Prokofyeva 3	Goals	Niu Guannan 4	Kazan; Attendance: 2,653; Referees: Georgios Stavridis (GRE), Joseph Peila (USA)

== Knockout stage ==
Championship bracket

Playoffs; 1 August
United States	12
Hungary	7
Brazil	8
China	10
Canada	5
Greece	8
Kazakhstan	1
Netherlands	21

Quarterfinals; 3 August
Spain	5
United States	8
Australia	12
China	10
Italy	9
Greece	6
Russia	9
Netherlands	10

Semifinals; 5 August
United States	8
Australia	6
Italy	9
Netherlands	10

Final; 7 August
United States	5
Netherlands	4
Third place
Australia	10
Italy	12

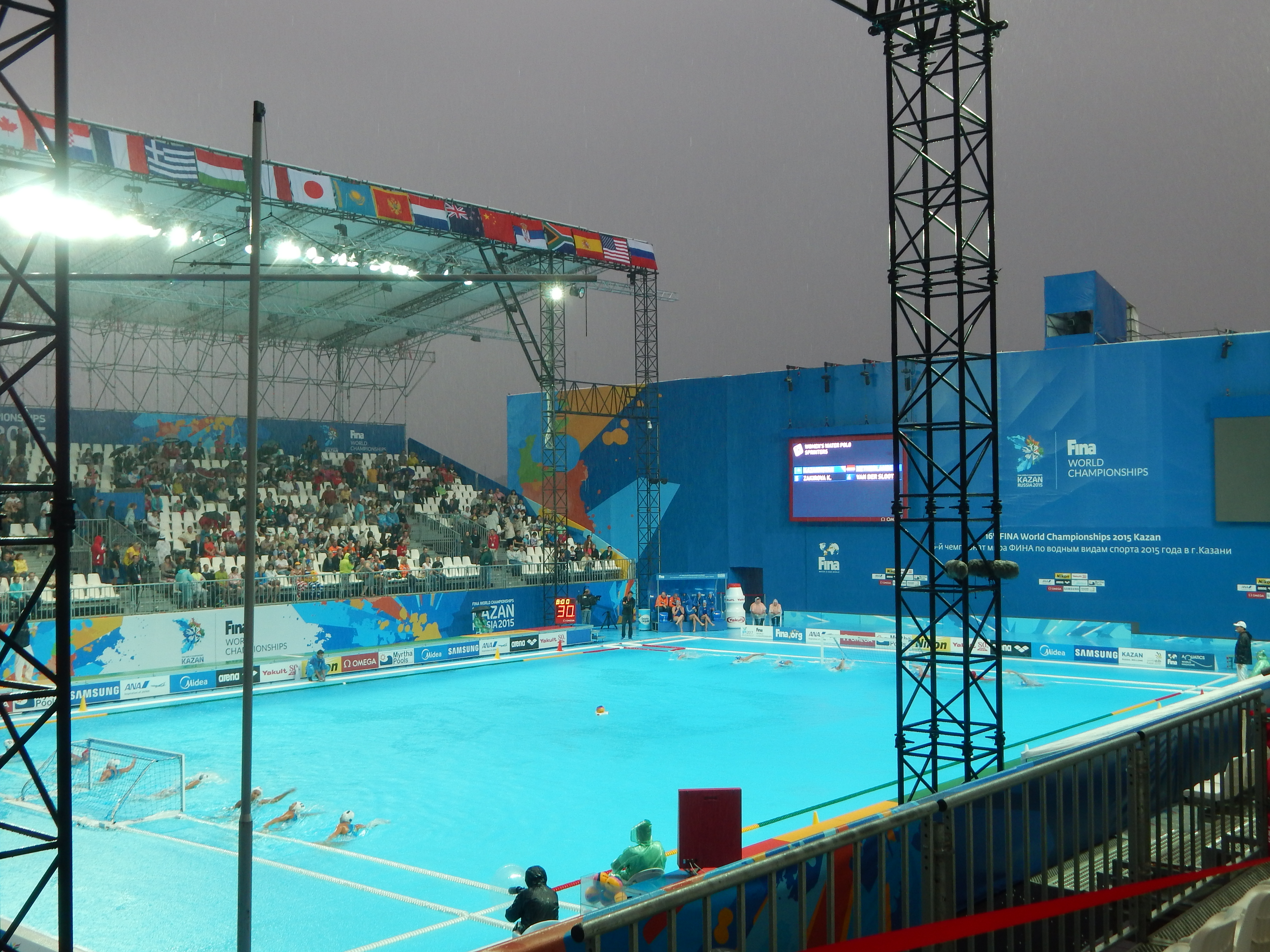
Playoff between the Netherlands and Kazakhstan was held during a rainstorm

5th place bracket

5th–8th place classification
5 August
Spain	9
China	10
5 August
Greece	16
Russia	15

5th place match
7 August
China	13
Greece	12
7th place match
7 August
Spain	15
Russia	10

9th place bracket

9th–12th place classification
3 August
Canada	7
Hungary	10
3 August
Kazakhstan	5
Brazil	10

9th place match
5 August
Hungary	22
Brazil	7
11th place match
5 August
Canada	20
Kazakhstan	4

13th place bracket

13th–16th place classification
1 August
New Zealand	11
South Africa	3
1 August
Japan	6
France	9

13th place match
3 August
New Zealand	7
France	6
15th place match
3 August
South Africa	7
Japan	15

=== Playoffs ===
All times are MSK (UTC+3).

1 August 2015; 13:30	Report	Canada	5–8	Greece	Kazan; Attendance: 2,055; Referees: German Moller (ARG), Vojin Putniković (SRB)
1 August 2015; 13:30	Report	Score by quarters: 3–3, 1–1, 0–2, 1–2			Kazan; Attendance: 2,055; Referees: German Moller (ARG), Vojin Putniković (SRB)
1 August 2015; 13:30	Report	Valin 2	Goals	Charalampidi 3	Kazan; Attendance: 2,055; Referees: German Moller (ARG), Vojin Putniković (SRB)

1 August 2015; 17:30	Report	Kazakhstan	1–21	Netherlands	Kazan; Attendance: 2,150; Referees: Joseph Peila (AUS), Cory Williams (NZL)
1 August 2015; 17:30	Report	Score by quarters: 0–4, 0–7, 0–6, 1–4			Kazan; Attendance: 2,150; Referees: Joseph Peila (AUS), Cory Williams (NZL)
1 August 2015; 17:30	Report	Mirshina 1	Goals	Smit 5	Kazan; Attendance: 2,150; Referees: Joseph Peila (AUS), Cory Williams (NZL)

1 August 2015; 18:50	Report	United States	12–7	Hungary	Kazan; Attendance: 780; Referees: Ursula Wengenroth (SUI), Daniel Flahive (AUS)
1 August 2015; 18:50	Report	Score by quarters: 3–1, 4–1, 4–1, 1–4			Kazan; Attendance: 780; Referees: Ursula Wengenroth (SUI), Daniel Flahive (AUS)
1 August 2015; 18:50	Report	Fattal 4	Goals	Keszthelyi 3	Kazan; Attendance: 780; Referees: Ursula Wengenroth (SUI), Daniel Flahive (AUS)

1 August 2015; 20:10	Report	Brazil	8–10	China	Kazan; Attendance: 350; Referees: Stephane Roy (CAN), Dion Willis (RSA)
1 August 2015; 20:10	Report	Score by quarters: 1–2, 1–3, 4–3, 2–2			Kazan; Attendance: 350; Referees: Stephane Roy (CAN), Dion Willis (RSA)
1 August 2015; 20:10	Report	Chiappini 5	Goals	three players 2	Kazan; Attendance: 350; Referees: Stephane Roy (CAN), Dion Willis (RSA)

=== Quarterfinals ===
All times are MSK (UTC+3).

3 August 2015; 17:30	Report	Spain	5–8	United States	Kazan; Attendance: 1,460; Referees: Massimiliano Caputi (ITA), Georgios Stavridis (GRE)
3 August 2015; 17:30	Report	Score by quarters: 0–2, 2–3, 2–1, 1–2			Kazan; Attendance: 1,460; Referees: Massimiliano Caputi (ITA), Georgios Stavridis (GRE)
3 August 2015; 17:30	Report	Espar 2	Goals	Fattal, Neushul 2	Kazan; Attendance: 1,460; Referees: Massimiliano Caputi (ITA), Georgios Stavridis (GRE)

3 August 2015; 18:50	Report	Russia	9–10	Netherlands	Kazan; Attendance: 2,319; Referees: Nenad Peris (CRO), Adrian Alexandrescu (ROU)
3 August 2015; 18:50	Report	Score by quarters: 1–4, 4–3, 2–1, 2–2			Kazan; Attendance: 2,319; Referees: Nenad Peris (CRO), Adrian Alexandrescu (ROU)
3 August 2015; 18:50	Report	Ivanova, Karimova 3	Goals	Megens, Klaassen 3	Kazan; Attendance: 2,319; Referees: Nenad Peris (CRO), Adrian Alexandrescu (ROU)

3 August 2015; 20:10	Report	Australia	12–10 (PSO)	China	Kazan; Attendance: 370; Referees: Francesc Buch (ESP), Vojin Putniković (SRB)
3 August 2015; 20:10	Report	Score by quarters: 2–3, 0–1, 4–2, 1–1 PSO: 5–3			Kazan; Attendance: 370; Referees: Francesc Buch (ESP), Vojin Putniković (SRB)
3 August 2015; 20:10	Report	seven players 1	Goals	Song Donglun, Zhao Zihan 2	Kazan; Attendance: 370; Referees: Francesc Buch (ESP), Vojin Putniković (SRB)

3 August 2015; 21:30	Report	Italy	9–6	Greece	Kazan; Referees: Mark Koganov (AZE), Radosław Koryzna (POL)
3 August 2015; 21:30	Report	Score by quarters: 1–0, 3–3, 3–2, 2–1			Kazan; Referees: Mark Koganov (AZE), Radosław Koryzna (POL)
3 August 2015; 21:30	Report	Di Mario 4	Goals	Charalampidi 3	Kazan; Referees: Mark Koganov (AZE), Radosław Koryzna (POL)

=== 13th–16th place classification ===
All times are MSK (UTC+3).

1 August 2015; 10:50	Report	New Zealand	11–3	South Africa	Kazan; Attendance: 1,357; Referees: Anne Grandin (FRA), Tadao Tahara (JPN)
1 August 2015; 10:50	Report	Score by quarters: 2–0, 2–0, 4–3, 3–0			Kazan; Attendance: 1,357; Referees: Anne Grandin (FRA), Tadao Tahara (JPN)
1 August 2015; 10:50	Report	Myles 3	Goals	three players 1	Kazan; Attendance: 1,357; Referees: Anne Grandin (FRA), Tadao Tahara (JPN)

1 August 2015; 12:10	Report	Japan	6–9	France	Kazan; Attendance: 1,969; Referees: Fábio Toffoli (BRA), Peter de Jong (NED)
1 August 2015; 12:10	Report	Score by quarters: 3–2, 1–4, 1–1, 1–2			Kazan; Attendance: 1,969; Referees: Fábio Toffoli (BRA), Peter de Jong (NED)
1 August 2015; 12:10	Report	Nakano 2	Goals	Guillet 5	Kazan; Attendance: 1,969; Referees: Fábio Toffoli (BRA), Peter de Jong (NED)

=== 9th–12th place classification ===
All times are MSK (UTC+3).

3 August 2015; 12:10	Report	Canada	7–10	Hungary	Kazan; Attendance: 274; Referees: Ursula Wengenroth (SUI), Cory Williams (NZL)
3 August 2015; 12:10	Report	Score by quarters: 1–2, 2–2, 3–2, 1–4			Kazan; Attendance: 274; Referees: Ursula Wengenroth (SUI), Cory Williams (NZL)
3 August 2015; 12:10	Report	Wright 2	Goals	Keszthelyi 4	Kazan; Attendance: 274; Referees: Ursula Wengenroth (SUI), Cory Williams (NZL)

3 August 2015; 13:30	Report	Kazakhstan	5–10	Brazil	Kazan; Attendance: 155; Referees: Anne Grandin (FRA), Ni Shi Wei (CHN)
3 August 2015; 13:30	Report	Score by quarters: 1–2, 0–4, 2–4, 2–0			Kazan; Attendance: 155; Referees: Anne Grandin (FRA), Ni Shi Wei (CHN)
3 August 2015; 13:30	Report	Mirshina 3	Goals	Chiappini 3	Kazan; Attendance: 155; Referees: Anne Grandin (FRA), Ni Shi Wei (CHN)

=== 5th–8th place classification ===
All times are MSK (UTC+3).

5 August 2015; 15:30	Report	Spain	9–10	China	Kazan; Attendance: 297; Referees: Joseph Peila (USA), Joseph Peila (AUS)
5 August 2015; 15:30	Report	Score by quarters: 3–3, 2–1, 2–4, 2–2			Kazan; Attendance: 297; Referees: Joseph Peila (USA), Joseph Peila (AUS)
5 August 2015; 15:30	Report	Forca 3	Goals	Song Donglun, Zhao Zihan 4	Kazan; Attendance: 297; Referees: Joseph Peila (USA), Joseph Peila (AUS)

5 August 2015; 17:00	Report	Greece	16–15 (PSO)	Russia	Kazan; Attendance: 690; Referees: Adrian Alexandrescu (ROU), György Kun (HUN)
5 August 2015; 17:00	Report	Score by quarters: 4–3, 1–4, 3–2, 4–3 PSO: 4–3			Kazan; Attendance: 690; Referees: Adrian Alexandrescu (ROU), György Kun (HUN)
5 August 2015; 17:00	Report	Roumpesi 3	Goals	Ivanova 4	Kazan; Attendance: 690; Referees: Adrian Alexandrescu (ROU), György Kun (HUN)

=== Semifinals ===
All times are MSK (UTC+3).

5 August 2015; 20:30	Report	United States	8–6	Australia	Kazan; Attendance: 1,007; Referees: Boris Margeta (SLO), Georgios Stavridis (GRE)
5 August 2015; 20:30	Report	Score by quarters: 2–2, 3–3, 1–0, 2–1			Kazan; Attendance: 1,007; Referees: Boris Margeta (SLO), Georgios Stavridis (GRE)
5 August 2015; 20:30	Report	Fattal, Steffens 2	Goals	six players 1	Kazan; Attendance: 1,007; Referees: Boris Margeta (SLO), Georgios Stavridis (GRE)

5 August 2015; 22:00	Report	Italy	9–10 (PSO)	Netherlands	Kazan; Attendance: 717; Referees: Sergey Naumov (RUS), Nenad Peris (CRO)
5 August 2015; 22:00	Report	Score by quarters: 0–2, 1–3, 1–0, 3–0 PSO: 4–5			Kazan; Attendance: 717; Referees: Sergey Naumov (RUS), Nenad Peris (CRO)
5 August 2015; 22:00	Report	Radicchi 2	Goals	Megens 4	Kazan; Attendance: 717; Referees: Sergey Naumov (RUS), Nenad Peris (CRO)

=== 15th place match ===
All times are MSK (UTC+3).

3 August 2015; 09:30	Report	South Africa	7–15	Japan	Kazan; Attendance: 329; Referees: Peter de Jong (NED), German Moller (ARG)
3 August 2015; 09:30	Report	Score by quarters: 0–2, 0–2, 3–8, 4–3			Kazan; Attendance: 329; Referees: Peter de Jong (NED), German Moller (ARG)
3 August 2015; 09:30	Report	White 2	Goals	Nakano 4	Kazan; Attendance: 329; Referees: Peter de Jong (NED), German Moller (ARG)

=== 13th place match ===
All times are MSK (UTC+3).

3 August 2015; 10:50	Report	New Zealand	7–6	France	Kazan; Attendance: 400; Referees: Dion Willis (RSA), Stephane Roy (CAN)
3 August 2015; 10:50	Report	Score by quarters: 1–2, 3–2, 1–2, 2–0			Kazan; Attendance: 400; Referees: Dion Willis (RSA), Stephane Roy (CAN)
3 August 2015; 10:50	Report	Myles 2	Goals	Millot, Tardy 2	Kazan; Attendance: 400; Referees: Dion Willis (RSA), Stephane Roy (CAN)

=== 11th place match ===
All times are MSK (UTC+3).

5 August 2015; 10:50	Report	Canada	20–4	Kazakhstan	Kazan; Attendance: 235; Referees: Anne Grandin (FRA), Cory Williams (NZL)
5 August 2015; 10:50	Report	Score by quarters: 4–1, 5–1, 5–2, 6–0			Kazan; Attendance: 235; Referees: Anne Grandin (FRA), Cory Williams (NZL)
5 August 2015; 10:50	Report	M. Eggens 5	Goals	Mirshina 2	Kazan; Attendance: 235; Referees: Anne Grandin (FRA), Cory Williams (NZL)

=== 9th place match ===
All times are MSK (UTC+3).

5 August 2015; 12:10	Report	Hungary	22–7	Brazil	Kazan; Attendance: 205; Referees: Ursula Wengenroth (SUI), Dion Willis (RSA)
5 August 2015; 12:10	Report	Score by quarters: 5–2, 6–2, 6–0, 5–3			Kazan; Attendance: 205; Referees: Ursula Wengenroth (SUI), Dion Willis (RSA)
5 August 2015; 12:10	Report	Keszthelyi 5	Goals	Chiappini, Zablith 2	Kazan; Attendance: 205; Referees: Ursula Wengenroth (SUI), Dion Willis (RSA)

=== 7th place match ===
All times are MSK (UTC+3).

7 August 2015; 14:00	Report	Spain	15–10	Russia	Kazan; Attendance: 1,336; Referees: Radoslaw Korzyna (POL), Nenad Peris (CRO)
7 August 2015; 14:00	Report	Score by quarters: 5–3, 3–4, 4–1, 3–2			Kazan; Attendance: 1,336; Referees: Radoslaw Korzyna (POL), Nenad Peris (CRO)
7 August 2015; 14:00	Report	Tarragó 4	Goals	Ivanova 3	Kazan; Attendance: 1,336; Referees: Radoslaw Korzyna (POL), Nenad Peris (CRO)

=== 5th place match ===
All times are MSK (UTC+3).

7 August 2015; 15:30	Report	China	13–12 (PSO)	Greece	Kazan; Attendance: 940; Referees: Mark Koganov (AZE), György Kun (HUN)
7 August 2015; 15:30	Report	Score by quarters: 4–2, 1–3, 2–1, 2–3 PSO: 4–3			Kazan; Attendance: 940; Referees: Mark Koganov (AZE), György Kun (HUN)
7 August 2015; 15:30	Report	Niu Guannan 5	Goals	Asimaki 4	Kazan; Attendance: 940; Referees: Mark Koganov (AZE), György Kun (HUN)

=== Bronze medal match ===
All times are MSK (UTC+3).

7 August 2015; 20:30	Report	Australia	10–12 (PSO)	Italy	Kazan; Attendance: 1,508; Referees: Francesc Buch (ESP), Vojin Putniković (SRB)
7 August 2015; 20:30	Report	Score by quarters: 2–3, 1–2, 2–0, 2–2 PSO: 3–5			Kazan; Attendance: 1,508; Referees: Francesc Buch (ESP), Vojin Putniković (SRB)
7 August 2015; 20:30	Report	Southern, Webster 2	Goals	Di Mario 3	Kazan; Attendance: 1,508; Referees: Francesc Buch (ESP), Vojin Putniković (SRB)

=== Gold medal match ===
All times are MSK (UTC+3).

7 August 2015; 22:00	Report	United States	5–4	Netherlands	Kazan; Attendance: 2,305; Referees: Sergey Naumov (RUS), Massimiliano Caputi (ITA)
7 August 2015; 22:00	Report	Score by quarters: 0–1, 2–1, 3–1, 0–1			Kazan; Attendance: 2,305; Referees: Sergey Naumov (RUS), Massimiliano Caputi (ITA)
7 August 2015; 22:00	Report	Fattal 2 Musselman, Neushul, Mathewson 1	Goals	Megens 2 Smit, Klaassen 1	Kazan; Attendance: 2,305; Referees: Sergey Naumov (RUS), Massimiliano Caputi (ITA)

== Ranking and statistics ==
=== Final ranking ===
Rank	Team
1st place, gold medalist(s)	United States
2nd place, silver medalist(s)	Netherlands
3rd place, bronze medalist(s)	Italy
4	Australia
5	China
6	Greece
7	Spain
8	Russia
9	Hungary
10	Brazil
11	Canada
12	Kazakhstan
13	New Zealand
14	France
15	Japan
16	South Africa

2015 Women's Water Polo World champions

United States
Fourth title

Team Roster

Sami Hill, Maddie Musselman, Melissa Seidemann, Rachel Fattal, Alys Williams, Maggie Steffens (C), Courtney Mathewson, Kiley Neushul, Ashley Grossman, Kaleigh Gilchrist, Makenzie Fischer, Kami Craig, Ashleigh Johnson. Head coach: Adam Krikorian.

=== Top goalscorers ===
Rank	Name	Goals	Shots	%
1	(Hungary) Rita Keszthelyi	21	35	60
2	(China) Zhao Zihan	19	43	44
3	(United States) Rachel Fattal	18	33	55
3	(China) Niu Guannan	18	44	41
5	(Brazil) Izabella Chiappini	17	41	41
6	(Canada) Monika Eggens	16	32	50
7	(Russia) Eugeniya Ivanova	15	37	40
8	(Hungary) Barbara Bujka	14	23	61
8	(Netherlands) Yasemin Smit	14	32	44
8	(Spain) Roser Tarragó	14	31	45

Source: SportResult

=== Awards ===
Most Valuable Player

- (United States) Rachel Fattal

Best Goalscorer

- (Hungary) Rita Keszthelyi – 21 goals

Media All-Star Team

- (United States) Ashleigh Johnson – Goalkeeper
- (United States) Kami Craig – Centre forward
- (Australia) Zoe Arancini
- (Italy) Roberta Bianconi
- (United States) Rachel Fattal
- (Hungary) Rita Keszthelyi
- (Netherlands) Maud Megens
