= Zhao Zihan =

Chinese water polo player (born 1993)

Personal information
- Born: 4 September 1993 (age 32)
- Height: 172 cm (5 ft 8 in)
- Weight: 61 kg (134 lb)

Sport
- Sport: water polo
Medal record
Representing China
Asian Games
Gold medal – first place	2014 Incheon	Team competition
- Updated on 19 August 2015

Zhao Zihan (born 4 September 1993) is a Chinese water polo player.

She was part of the Chinese team at the 2015 World Aquatics Championships, and the 2016 Summer Olympics.

== See also ==
- China at the 2015 World Aquatics Championships
