= 2020 Women's European Water Polo Championship =

Tournament details
- Host country: Hungary
- Venue: 1 (in 1 host city)
- Dates: 12–25 January
- Teams: 12 (from 1 confederation)

Final positions
- Champions: Spain (2nd title)
- Runners-up: Russia
- Third place: Hungary
- Fourth place: Netherlands

Tournament statistics
- Matches played: 44
- Goals scored: 929 (21.11 per match)
- Top scorers: (Hungary) Rita Keszthelyi (28 goals)

Awards
- Best player: (Spain) Beatriz Ortiz

The 2020 Women's European Water Polo Championship was the 18th edition of the major European water polo tournament for national teams. It was held at the Danube Arena in Budapest, Hungary, from 12 to 25 January 2020.

Spain defeated Russia 13–12 in the final to win their second title.

== Host ==
LEN announced the choice of Budapest as host for the competition on 9 July 2016. All the matches were played at the Danube Arena.

Budapest	2020 Women's European Water Polo Championship (Europe)
Danube Arena	2020 Women's European Water Polo Championship (Europe)
Capacity: 5,000	2020 Women's European Water Polo Championship (Europe)

== Qualification ==
Twelve teams were allowed to the tournament. The qualification was as follows:

- The host nation
- The best five teams from the 2018 European Championships
- Six teams from the qualifiers

Event	Date	Location	Vacancies	Qualified
Host nation	9 July 2016	–	1	Hungary
2018 European Championships	14–27 July 2018	(Spain) Barcelona	5	Netherlands; Greece; Spain; Russia; Italy
Qualifiers	25 April–26 October 2019	Various	6	France; Germany; Serbia; Israel; Croatia; Slovakia

== Format ==
The twelve teams were split in two groups with six teams each. The first four teams of each group played each other in the quarterfinals in cross group format, the remaining teams played for places nine to twelve.

== Draw ==
The draw of the preliminary round's pools took place in Budapest on 22 October 2019. The teams were drawn into two groups of six. The first batch included the best two teams of the previous edition; the teams ranked third and fourth were in the second batch, the fifth and the sixth in the third batch and the qualification winners in the fourth batch.

Pot 1	Pot 2	Pot 3	Pot 4
Netherlands; Greece	Spain; Hungary	Russia; Italy	Play-offs winners

With the play-offs winners determined on 26 October, the draw resulted in the following groups:

Group A	Group B
Croatia	France
Greece	Germany
Hungary	Israel
Russia	Italy
Serbia	Netherlands
Slovakia	Spain

== Preliminary round ==
All times are local (UTC+1).

=== Group A ===
Pos	Team	Pld	W	D	L	GF	GA	GD	Pts	Qualification
1	Hungary (H)	5	5	0	0	94	26	+68	15	Quarterfinals
2	Russia	5	4	0	1	112	21	+91	12	Quarterfinals
3	Greece	5	3	0	2	79	37	+42	9	Quarterfinals
4	Slovakia	5	2	0	3	21	78	−57	6	Quarterfinals
5	Croatia	5	1	0	4	26	94	−68	3	9th place match
6	Serbia	5	0	0	5	19	95	−76	0	11th place match

Source: WP2020Budapest
Rules for classification: 1) points; 2) head-to-head points; 3) head-to-head goal difference; 4) head-to-head number of goals scored; 5) goal difference.
(H) Hosts

12 January 2020; 11:30	Report	Slovakia	2–31	Russia	Danube Arena, Budapest; Referees: Diana Dutilh-Dumas (NED), Sébastien Dervieux (FRA)
12 January 2020; 11:30	Report	Score by quarters: 0–9, 0–5, 1–8, 1–9			Danube Arena, Budapest; Referees: Diana Dutilh-Dumas (NED), Sébastien Dervieux (FRA)
12 January 2020; 11:30	Report	Kolářová 2	Goals	Bersneva, Gorbunova 6	Danube Arena, Budapest; Referees: Diana Dutilh-Dumas (NED), Sébastien Dervieux (FRA)

12 January 2020; 13:00	Report	Greece	26–7	Serbia	Danube Arena, Budapest; Referees: Giuliana Nicolosi (ITA), Carlos Ortega (ESP)
12 January 2020; 13:00	Report	Score by quarters: 9–1, 5–3, 5–2, 7–1			Danube Arena, Budapest; Referees: Giuliana Nicolosi (ITA), Carlos Ortega (ESP)
12 January 2020; 13:00	Report	Myriokefalitaki 6	Goals	Vuković 3	Danube Arena, Budapest; Referees: Giuliana Nicolosi (ITA), Carlos Ortega (ESP)

12 January 2020; 19:00	Report	Hungary	25–6	Croatia	Danube Arena, Budapest; Referees: Erkan Turkkan (TUR), Marcela Mauss (GER)
12 January 2020; 19:00	Report	Score by quarters: 5–1, 7–2, 7–1, 6–2			Danube Arena, Budapest; Referees: Erkan Turkkan (TUR), Marcela Mauss (GER)
12 January 2020; 19:00	Report	Keszthelyi 5	Goals	D. Butić, Miljković 2	Danube Arena, Budapest; Referees: Erkan Turkkan (TUR), Marcela Mauss (GER)

13 January 2020; 13:00	Report	Croatia	3–18	Greece	Danube Arena, Budapest; Referees: Gernot Häntschel (GER), Luis Santos (POR)
13 January 2020; 13:00	Report	Score by quarters: 0–6, 2–4, 0–5, 1–3			Danube Arena, Budapest; Referees: Gernot Häntschel (GER), Luis Santos (POR)
13 January 2020; 13:00	Report	three players 1	Goals	three players 3	Danube Arena, Budapest; Referees: Gernot Häntschel (GER), Luis Santos (POR)

13 January 2020; 14:30	Report	Russia	27–2	Serbia	Danube Arena, Budapest; Referees: Michiel Zwart (NED), Aurely Blanchard (FRA)
13 January 2020; 14:30	Report	Score by quarters: 6–2, 8–0, 8–0, 5–0			Danube Arena, Budapest; Referees: Michiel Zwart (NED), Aurely Blanchard (FRA)
13 January 2020; 14:30	Report	Fedotova 7	Goals	Mandić, Vuković 1	Danube Arena, Budapest; Referees: Michiel Zwart (NED), Aurely Blanchard (FRA)

13 January 2020; 19:00	Report	Slovakia	2–20	Hungary	Danube Arena, Budapest; Referees: Radosław Koryzna (POL), Raffaele Colombo (ITA)
13 January 2020; 19:00	Report	Score by quarters: 1–5, 0–5, 1–4, 0–6			Danube Arena, Budapest; Referees: Radosław Koryzna (POL), Raffaele Colombo (ITA)
13 January 2020; 19:00	Report	Kátlovská, Stankovianska 1	Goals	Keszthelyi 6	Danube Arena, Budapest; Referees: Radosław Koryzna (POL), Raffaele Colombo (ITA)

15 January 2020; 14:30	Report	Greece	18–2	Slovakia	Danube Arena, Budapest; Referees: Aurely Blanchard (FRA), Marcela Mauss (GER)
15 January 2020; 14:30	Report	Score by quarters: 4–0, 4–2, 6–0, 4–0			Danube Arena, Budapest; Referees: Aurely Blanchard (FRA), Marcela Mauss (GER)
15 January 2020; 14:30	Report	M. Plevritou 5	Goals	Kolarova, Stankovianska 1	Danube Arena, Budapest; Referees: Aurely Blanchard (FRA), Marcela Mauss (GER)

15 January 2020; 16:00	Report	Serbia	8–9	Croatia	Danube Arena, Budapest; Referees: Diana Dutilh-Dumas (NED), Giuliana Nicolosi (ITA)
15 January 2020; 16:00	Report	Score by quarters: 1–2, 3–2, 3–3, 1–2			Danube Arena, Budapest; Referees: Diana Dutilh-Dumas (NED), Giuliana Nicolosi (ITA)
15 January 2020; 16:00	Report	Mandić, Milicević 2	Goals	Butić, Miljković 2	Danube Arena, Budapest; Referees: Diana Dutilh-Dumas (NED), Giuliana Nicolosi (ITA)

15 January 2020; 19:00	Report	Hungary	9–8	Russia	Danube Arena, Budapest; Referees: Sébastien Dervieux (FRA), Ursula Wengenroth (SUI)
15 January 2020; 19:00	Report	Score by quarters: 4–3, 2–0, 2–3, 1–2			Danube Arena, Budapest; Referees: Sébastien Dervieux (FRA), Ursula Wengenroth (SUI)
15 January 2020; 19:00	Report	Keszthelyi 8	Goals	Gorbunova 3	Danube Arena, Budapest; Referees: Sébastien Dervieux (FRA), Ursula Wengenroth (SUI)

17 January 2020; 14:30	Report	Russia	34–1	Croatia	Danube Arena, Budapest; Referees: Giuliana Nicolosi (ITA), Matan Schwartz (ISR)
17 January 2020; 14:30	Report	Score by quarters: 9–0, 8–1, 7–0, 10–0			Danube Arena, Budapest; Referees: Giuliana Nicolosi (ITA), Matan Schwartz (ISR)
17 January 2020; 14:30	Report	Karimova 6	Goals	Lordan 1	Danube Arena, Budapest; Referees: Giuliana Nicolosi (ITA), Matan Schwartz (ISR)

17 January 2020; 17:30	Report	Slovakia	6–2	Serbia	Danube Arena, Budapest; Referees: Aurely Blanchard (FRA), Marcela Mauss (GER)
17 January 2020; 17:30	Report	Score by quarters: 1–0, 2–1, 1–0, 2–1			Danube Arena, Budapest; Referees: Aurely Blanchard (FRA), Marcela Mauss (GER)
17 January 2020; 17:30	Report	Kováčiková 3	Goals	Ilić 2	Danube Arena, Budapest; Referees: Aurely Blanchard (FRA), Marcela Mauss (GER)

17 January 2020; 19:00	Report	Hungary	13–10	Greece	Danube Arena, Budapest; Referees: Boris Margeta (SLO), Michiel Zwart (NED)
17 January 2020; 19:00	Report	Score by quarters: 4–4, 4–2, 2–0, 3–4			Danube Arena, Budapest; Referees: Boris Margeta (SLO), Michiel Zwart (NED)
17 January 2020; 19:00	Report	Garda 4	Goals	three players 2	Danube Arena, Budapest; Referees: Boris Margeta (SLO), Michiel Zwart (NED)

19 January 2020; 13:00	Report	Slovakia	9–7	Croatia	Danube Arena, Budapest; Referees: Sébastien Dervieux (FRA), Marcela Mauss (GER)
19 January 2020; 13:00	Report	Score by quarters: 1–3, 3–1, 3–2, 2–1			Danube Arena, Budapest; Referees: Sébastien Dervieux (FRA), Marcela Mauss (GER)
19 January 2020; 13:00	Report	Kátlovská, Stankovianska 2	Goals	Carević 3	Danube Arena, Budapest; Referees: Sébastien Dervieux (FRA), Marcela Mauss (GER)

19 January 2020; 17:30	Report	Greece	7–12	Russia	Danube Arena, Budapest; Referees: Boris Margeta (SLO), Raffaele Colombo (ITA)
19 January 2020; 17:30	Report	Score by quarters: 3–1, 3–4, 0–3, 1–4			Danube Arena, Budapest; Referees: Boris Margeta (SLO), Raffaele Colombo (ITA)
19 January 2020; 17:30	Report	Tsoukala, Xenaki 2	Goals	Gorbunova, Prokofyeva 3	Danube Arena, Budapest; Referees: Boris Margeta (SLO), Raffaele Colombo (ITA)

19 January 2020; 19:00	Report	Serbia	0–27	Hungary	Danube Arena, Budapest; Referees: Aurely Blanchard (FRA), Giuliana Nicolosi (ITA)
19 January 2020; 19:00	Report	Score by quarters: 0–5, 0–5, 0–9, 0–8			Danube Arena, Budapest; Referees: Aurely Blanchard (FRA), Giuliana Nicolosi (ITA)
19 January 2020; 19:00	Report		Goals	Gurisatti 7	Danube Arena, Budapest; Referees: Aurely Blanchard (FRA), Giuliana Nicolosi (ITA)

=== Group B ===
Pos	Team	Pld	W	D	L	GF	GA	GD	Pts	Qualification
1	Netherlands	5	5	0	0	83	17	+66	15	Quarterfinals
2	Spain	5	4	0	1	74	32	+42	12	Quarterfinals
3	Italy	5	3	0	2	62	37	+25	9	Quarterfinals
4	France	5	2	0	3	40	62	−22	6	Quarterfinals
5	Israel	5	1	0	4	22	70	−48	3	9th place match
6	Germany	5	0	0	5	19	82	−63	0	11th place match

Source: WP2020Budapest
Rules for classification: 1) points; 2) head-to-head points; 3) head-to-head goal difference; 4) head-to-head number of goals scored; 5) goal difference.

12 January 2020; 14:30	Report	France	6–15	Spain	Danube Arena, Budapest; Referees: Ursula Wengenroth (SUI), Gabriella Várkonyi (HUN)
12 January 2020; 14:30	Report	Score by quarters: 1–3, 0–3, 1–4, 4–5			Danube Arena, Budapest; Referees: Ursula Wengenroth (SUI), Gabriella Várkonyi (HUN)
12 January 2020; 14:30	Report	Daule 3	Goals	A. Espar 4	Danube Arena, Budapest; Referees: Ursula Wengenroth (SUI), Gabriella Várkonyi (HUN)

12 January 2020; 16:00	Report	Germany	4–13	Italy	Danube Arena, Budapest; Referees: Luis Santos (POR), Svetlana Dreval (RUS)
12 January 2020; 16:00	Report	Score by quarters: 2–4, 2–5, 0–2, 0–2			Danube Arena, Budapest; Referees: Luis Santos (POR), Svetlana Dreval (RUS)
12 January 2020; 16:00	Report	Eggert 2	Goals	Garibotti 3	Danube Arena, Budapest; Referees: Luis Santos (POR), Svetlana Dreval (RUS)

12 January 2020; 17:30	Report	Netherlands	22–3	Israel	Danube Arena, Budapest; Referees: Peter Balzan (MLT), Levan Berishvili (GEO)
12 January 2020; 17:30	Report	Score by quarters: 4–0, 5–1, 7–1, 6–1			Danube Arena, Budapest; Referees: Peter Balzan (MLT), Levan Berishvili (GEO)
12 January 2020; 17:30	Report	Megens 5	Goals	Bogachenko 2	Danube Arena, Budapest; Referees: Peter Balzan (MLT), Levan Berishvili (GEO)

13 January 2020; 11:30	Report	Germany	3–23	Netherlands	Danube Arena, Budapest; Referees: Róbert Horváth (SVK), Veselin Mišković (MNE)
13 January 2020; 11:30	Report	Score by quarters: 1–6, 0–5, 0–5, 2–7			Danube Arena, Budapest; Referees: Róbert Horváth (SVK), Veselin Mišković (MNE)
13 January 2020; 11:30	Report	Pannasch 2	Goals	Van de Kraats, Sevenich 4	Danube Arena, Budapest; Referees: Róbert Horváth (SVK), Veselin Mišković (MNE)

13 January 2020; 16:00	Report	Israel	6–10	France	Danube Arena, Budapest; Referees: György Kun (HUN), Robert Tiozzo (CRO)
13 January 2020; 16:00	Report	Score by quarters: 2–3, 0–4, 1–1, 3–2			Danube Arena, Budapest; Referees: György Kun (HUN), Robert Tiozzo (CRO)
13 January 2020; 16:00	Report	Bogachenko 3	Goals	Millot 4	Danube Arena, Budapest; Referees: György Kun (HUN), Robert Tiozzo (CRO)

13 January 2020; 17:30	Report	Italy	10–16	Spain	Danube Arena, Budapest; Referees: Georgios Stavridis (GRE), Ivan Raković (SRB)
13 January 2020; 17:30	Report	Score by quarters: 2–5, 2–4, 3–3, 3–4			Danube Arena, Budapest; Referees: Georgios Stavridis (GRE), Ivan Raković (SRB)
13 January 2020; 17:30	Report	Bianconi, Garibotti 3	Goals	Tarragó 7	Danube Arena, Budapest; Referees: Georgios Stavridis (GRE), Ivan Raković (SRB)

15 January 2020; 11:30	Report	France	17–5	Germany	Danube Arena, Budapest; Referees: Peter Balzan (MLT), Erkan Turkkan (TUR)
15 January 2020; 11:30	Report	Score by quarters: 7–1, 3–1, 3–1, 4–2			Danube Arena, Budapest; Referees: Peter Balzan (MLT), Erkan Turkkan (TUR)
15 January 2020; 11:30	Report	three players 3	Goals	Deike 2	Danube Arena, Budapest; Referees: Peter Balzan (MLT), Erkan Turkkan (TUR)

15 January 2020; 13:00	Report	Spain	18–2	Israel	Danube Arena, Budapest; Referees: Gabriella Várkonyi (HUN), Svetlana Dreval (RUS)
15 January 2020; 13:00	Report	Score by quarters: 3–0, 4–1, 7–1, 4–0			Danube Arena, Budapest; Referees: Gabriella Várkonyi (HUN), Svetlana Dreval (RUS)
15 January 2020; 13:00	Report	Ortiz 5	Goals	Bogachenko 2	Danube Arena, Budapest; Referees: Gabriella Várkonyi (HUN), Svetlana Dreval (RUS)

15 January 2020; 17:30	Report	Netherlands	10–4	Italy	Danube Arena, Budapest; Referees: Radosław Koryzna (POL), Adrian Alexandrescu (ROU)
15 January 2020; 17:30	Report	Score by quarters: 2–2, 4–2, 3–0, 1–0			Danube Arena, Budapest; Referees: Radosław Koryzna (POL), Adrian Alexandrescu (ROU)
15 January 2020; 17:30	Report	Megens 5	Goals	Bianconi 3	Danube Arena, Budapest; Referees: Radosław Koryzna (POL), Adrian Alexandrescu (ROU)

17 January 2020; 11:30	Report	Germany	4–19	Spain	Danube Arena, Budapest; Referees: Sergey Naumov (RUS), György Kun (HUN)
17 January 2020; 11:30	Report	Score by quarters: 2–4, 0–5, 1–5, 1–5			Danube Arena, Budapest; Referees: Sergey Naumov (RUS), György Kun (HUN)
17 January 2020; 11:30	Report	four players 1	Goals	Crespí 4	Danube Arena, Budapest; Referees: Sergey Naumov (RUS), György Kun (HUN)

17 January 2020; 13:00	Report	Netherlands	18–1	France	Danube Arena, Budapest; Referees: Svetlana Dreval (RUS), Veselin Mišković (MNE)
17 January 2020; 13:00	Report	Score by quarters: 4–1, 6–0, 4–0, 4–0			Danube Arena, Budapest; Referees: Svetlana Dreval (RUS), Veselin Mišković (MNE)
17 January 2020; 13:00	Report	Keuning 4	Goals	Daule 1	Danube Arena, Budapest; Referees: Svetlana Dreval (RUS), Veselin Mišković (MNE)

17 January 2020; 16:00	Report	Italy	17–1	Israel	Danube Arena, Budapest; Referees: Róbert Horváth (SVK), Ursula Wengenroth (SUI)
17 January 2020; 16:00	Report	Score by quarters: 3–0, 5–0, 4–1, 5–0			Danube Arena, Budapest; Referees: Róbert Horváth (SVK), Ursula Wengenroth (SUI)
17 January 2020; 16:00	Report	Emmolo 4	Goals	Strugo 1	Danube Arena, Budapest; Referees: Róbert Horváth (SVK), Ursula Wengenroth (SUI)

19 January 2020; 11:30	Report	France	6–18	Italy	Danube Arena, Budapest; Referees: Erkan Turkkan (TUR), Ursula Wengenroth (SUI)
19 January 2020; 11:30	Report	Score by quarters: 2–3, 1–5, 2–6, 1–4			Danube Arena, Budapest; Referees: Erkan Turkkan (TUR), Ursula Wengenroth (SUI)
19 January 2020; 11:30	Report	six players 1	Goals	Bianconi 5	Danube Arena, Budapest; Referees: Erkan Turkkan (TUR), Ursula Wengenroth (SUI)

19 January 2020; 14:30	Report	Germany	3–10	Israel	Danube Arena, Budapest; Referees: Peter Balzan (MLT), Gabriella Várkonyi (HUN)
19 January 2020; 14:30	Report	Score by quarters: 1–3, 0–4, 0–3, 2–0			Danube Arena, Budapest; Referees: Peter Balzan (MLT), Gabriella Várkonyi (HUN)
19 January 2020; 14:30	Report	three players 1	Goals	Strugo 4	Danube Arena, Budapest; Referees: Peter Balzan (MLT), Gabriella Várkonyi (HUN)

19 January 2020; 16:00	Report	Spain	6–10	Netherlands	Danube Arena, Budapest; Referees: Georgios Stavridis (GRE), Sergey Naumov (RUS)
19 January 2020; 16:00	Report	Score by quarters: 0–2, 1–4, 2–2, 3–2			Danube Arena, Budapest; Referees: Georgios Stavridis (GRE), Sergey Naumov (RUS)
19 January 2020; 16:00	Report	García Godoy 2	Goals	Megens 3	Danube Arena, Budapest; Referees: Georgios Stavridis (GRE), Sergey Naumov (RUS)

== Knockout stage ==
=== Bracket ===
Quarterfinals
21 January
Hungary	16
France	3
21 January
Greece	9
Spain	12
21 January
Russia	13
Italy	7
21 January
Slovakia	2
Netherlands	22

Semifinals
23 January
Hungary	10
Spain	11
23 January
Russia (PSO)	11
Netherlands	10

Final
25 January
Spain	13
Russia	12
Third place
25 January
Hungary	10
Netherlands	8

5th place bracket

5–8th place semifinals
23 January
France	3
Greece	13
23 January
Italy	16
Slovakia	4

Fifth place
25 January
Greece	5
Italy	7
Seventh place
25 January
France	17
Slovakia	8

=== Quarterfinals ===
21 January 2020; 14:30	Report	Slovakia	2–22	Netherlands	Danube Arena, Budapest; Referees: Gabriella Várkonyi (HUN), Ivan Raković (SRB)
21 January 2020; 14:30	Report	Score by quarters: 0–6, 0–3, 1–7, 1–6			Danube Arena, Budapest; Referees: Gabriella Várkonyi (HUN), Ivan Raković (SRB)
21 January 2020; 14:30	Report	Junasová, Stankovianska 1	Goals	Megens 5	Danube Arena, Budapest; Referees: Gabriella Várkonyi (HUN), Ivan Raković (SRB)

21 January 2020; 16:00	Report	Russia	13–7	Italy	Danube Arena, Budapest; Referees: Adrian Alexandrescu (ROU), Radosław Koryzna (POL)
21 January 2020; 16:00	Report	Score by quarters: 3–2, 3–3, 4–1, 3–1			Danube Arena, Budapest; Referees: Adrian Alexandrescu (ROU), Radosław Koryzna (POL)
21 January 2020; 16:00	Report	three players 3	Goals	three players 2	Danube Arena, Budapest; Referees: Adrian Alexandrescu (ROU), Radosław Koryzna (POL)

21 January 2020; 17:30	Report	Greece	9–12	Spain	Danube Arena, Budapest; Referees: Boris Margeta (SLO), Matan Schwartz (ISR)
21 January 2020; 17:30	Report	Score by quarters: 3–4, 2–2, 1–3, 3–3			Danube Arena, Budapest; Referees: Boris Margeta (SLO), Matan Schwartz (ISR)
21 January 2020; 17:30	Report	M. Plevritou 4	Goals	Ortiz 4	Danube Arena, Budapest; Referees: Boris Margeta (SLO), Matan Schwartz (ISR)

21 January 2020; 19:00	Report	Hungary	16–3	France	Danube Arena, Budapest; Referees: Svetlana Dreval (RUS), Giuliana Nicolosi (ITA)
21 January 2020; 19:00	Report	Score by quarters: 5–2, 3–1, 5–0, 3–0			Danube Arena, Budapest; Referees: Svetlana Dreval (RUS), Giuliana Nicolosi (ITA)
21 January 2020; 19:00	Report	Keszthelyi 4	Goals	Guillet 2	Danube Arena, Budapest; Referees: Svetlana Dreval (RUS), Giuliana Nicolosi (ITA)

=== 5–8th place semifinals ===
23 January 2020; 14:30	Report	France	3–13	Greece	Danube Arena, Budapest; Referees: Marcela Mauss (GER), Diana Dutulh-Dumas (NED)
23 January 2020; 14:30	Report	Score by quarters: 1–2, 0–2, 1–6, 1–3			Danube Arena, Budapest; Referees: Marcela Mauss (GER), Diana Dutulh-Dumas (NED)
23 January 2020; 14:30	Report	Vernoux 2	Goals	E. Plevritou, Xenaki 3	Danube Arena, Budapest; Referees: Marcela Mauss (GER), Diana Dutulh-Dumas (NED)

23 January 2020; 16:00	Report	Italy	16–4	Slovakia	Danube Arena, Budapest; Referees: Gabriella Várkonyi (HUN), Ursula Wengenroth (SUI)
23 January 2020; 16:00	Report	Score by quarters: 2–1, 5–1, 6–0, 3–2			Danube Arena, Budapest; Referees: Gabriella Várkonyi (HUN), Ursula Wengenroth (SUI)
23 January 2020; 16:00	Report	three players 3	Goals	four players 1	Danube Arena, Budapest; Referees: Gabriella Várkonyi (HUN), Ursula Wengenroth (SUI)

=== Semifinals ===
23 January 2020; 17:30	Report	Russia	11–10 (PSO)	Netherlands	Danube Arena, Budapest; Referees: Adrian Alexandrescu (ROU), Giuliana Nicolosi (ITA)
23 January 2020; 17:30	Report	Score by quarters: 2–2, 2–2, 1–2, 2–1 PSO: 4–3			Danube Arena, Budapest; Referees: Adrian Alexandrescu (ROU), Giuliana Nicolosi (ITA)
23 January 2020; 17:30	Report	Gorbunova 4	Goals	Megens, Van der Sloot 2	Danube Arena, Budapest; Referees: Adrian Alexandrescu (ROU), Giuliana Nicolosi (ITA)

23 January 2020; 19:00	Report	Hungary	10–11	Spain	Danube Arena, Budapest; Referees: Sébastien Dervieux (FRA), Georgios Stavridis (GRE)
23 January 2020; 19:00	Report	Score by quarters: 3–3, 1–2, 3–2, 3–4			Danube Arena, Budapest; Referees: Sébastien Dervieux (FRA), Georgios Stavridis (GRE)
23 January 2020; 19:00	Report	Keszthelyi, Leimeter 3	Goals	A. Espar, Tarragó 3	Danube Arena, Budapest; Referees: Sébastien Dervieux (FRA), Georgios Stavridis (GRE)

=== Finals ===
==== Eleventh place game ====
21 January 2020; 11:30	Report	Serbia	13–15 (PSO)	Germany	Danube Arena, Budapest; Referees: György Kun (HUN), Aurely Blanchard (FRA)
21 January 2020; 11:30	Report	Score by quarters: 2–4, 2–1, 6–2, 1–4 PSO: 2–4			Danube Arena, Budapest; Referees: György Kun (HUN), Aurely Blanchard (FRA)
21 January 2020; 11:30	Report	Milicevic 3	Goals	Deike 3	Danube Arena, Budapest; Referees: György Kun (HUN), Aurely Blanchard (FRA)

==== Ninth place game ====
21 January 2020; 13:00	Report	Croatia	7–11	Israel	Danube Arena, Budapest; Referees: Diana Dutilh-Dumas (NED), Peter Balzan (MLT)
21 January 2020; 13:00	Report	Score by quarters: 1–1, 2–6, 2–2, 2–2			Danube Arena, Budapest; Referees: Diana Dutilh-Dumas (NED), Peter Balzan (MLT)
21 January 2020; 13:00	Report	Lordan 2	Goals	Bogachenko, Hochberg 3	Danube Arena, Budapest; Referees: Diana Dutilh-Dumas (NED), Peter Balzan (MLT)

==== Seventh place game ====
25 January 2020; 14:30	Report	France	17–8	Slovakia	Danube Arena, Budapest; Referees: Diana Dutilh-Dumas (NED), Ivan Raković (SRB)
25 January 2020; 14:30	Report	Score by quarters: 5–2, 4–2, 5–1, 3–3			Danube Arena, Budapest; Referees: Diana Dutilh-Dumas (NED), Ivan Raković (SRB)
25 January 2020; 14:30	Report	Bachelier 5	Goals	Junasová 2	Danube Arena, Budapest; Referees: Diana Dutilh-Dumas (NED), Ivan Raković (SRB)

==== Fifth place game ====
25 January 2020; 16:00	Report	Greece	5–7	Italy	Danube Arena, Budapest; Referees: Svetlana Dreval (RUS), Gernot Häntschel (GER)
25 January 2020; 16:00	Report	Score by quarters: 3–3, 1–2, 0–1, 1–1			Danube Arena, Budapest; Referees: Svetlana Dreval (RUS), Gernot Häntschel (GER)
25 January 2020; 16:00	Report	five players 1	Goals	Garibotti 2	Danube Arena, Budapest; Referees: Svetlana Dreval (RUS), Gernot Häntschel (GER)

==== Bronze medal game ====
25 January 2020; 17:30	Report	Hungary	10–8	Netherlands	Danube Arena, Budapest; Referees: Giuliana Nicolosi (ITA), Radosław Koryzna (POL)
25 January 2020; 17:30	Report	Score by quarters: 3–5, 2–2, 4–1, 1–0			Danube Arena, Budapest; Referees: Giuliana Nicolosi (ITA), Radosław Koryzna (POL)
25 January 2020; 17:30	Report	four players 2	Goals	Megens 2	Danube Arena, Budapest; Referees: Giuliana Nicolosi (ITA), Radosław Koryzna (POL)

==== Gold medal game ====
25 January 2020; 19:00	Report	Spain	13–12	Russia	Danube Arena, Budapest; Referees: Gabriella Várkonyi (HUN), Adrian Alexandrescu (ROU)
25 January 2020; 19:00	Report	Score by quarters: 3–4, 5–4, 2–2, 3–2			Danube Arena, Budapest; Referees: Gabriella Várkonyi (HUN), Adrian Alexandrescu (ROU)
25 January 2020; 19:00	Report	García Godoy 4	Goals	Prokofyeva 4	Danube Arena, Budapest; Referees: Gabriella Várkonyi (HUN), Adrian Alexandrescu (ROU)

== Final standing ==
Qualified for the 2020 Summer Olympics

Rank	Team
1st place, gold medalist(s)	Spain^{1}
2nd place, silver medalist(s)	Russia
3rd place, bronze medalist(s)	Hungary
4	Netherlands
5	Italy
6	Greece
7	France
8	Slovakia
9	Israel
10	Croatia
11	Germany
12	Serbia

^{1} Spain qualified for the Olympics by finishing second in the 2019 World Championships.

== Statistics and awards ==
=== Top goalscorers ===
Rank	Name	Team	Goals	Shots	%
1	Rita Keszthelyi	Hungary	28	48	58
2	Olga Gorbunova	Russia	27	49	55
3	Maud Megens	Netherlands	26	51	51
4	Elvina Karimova	Russia	20	33	61
4	Beatriz Ortiz	Spain	20	45	44
4	Alena Serzhantova	Russia	20	29	59
7	Eleni Xenaki	Greece	18	37	49
8	Roberta Bianconi	Italy	17	30	57
8	Arianna Garibotti	Italy	17	34	50
8	Eleftheria Plevritou	Greece	17	34	50

Source: wp2020budapest.microplustiming.com

=== Top goalkeepers ===
Rank	Name	Team	Saves	Shots	%
1	Kristina Horváthová	Slovakia	70	182	39
2	Debby Willemsz	Netherlands	59	88	67
3	Anna Karnaukh	Russia	57	101	56
4	Lorene Derenty	France	51	125	41
4	Giulia Gorlero	Italy	51	97	53
6	Ayelet Peres	Israel	43	94	46
7	Ioanna Stamatopoulou	Greece	39	48	81
7	Edina Gangl	Hungary	39	60	65
9	Felicitas Saurusajtis	Germany	37	104	36
10	Chrysi Diamantopoulou	Greece	31	77	40

Source: wp2020budapest.microplustiming.com

=== Awards ===
The awards were announced on 26 January 2020.

Award	Player
Most Valuable Player	(Spain) Beatriz Ortiz
Best Goalkeeper	(Russia) Anna Karnaukh
Topscorer	(Hungary) Rita Keszthelyi (28 goals)
