= Niu Guannan =

Chinese water polo player (born 1992)

Personal information
- Born: 10 May 1992 (age 34) Guangxi, China
- Height: 177 cm (5 ft 10 in)
- Weight: 69 kg (152 lb)

Sport
- Sport: water polo
Medal record
Representing China
Asian Games
Gold medal – first place	2018 Jakarta	Team competition
- Updated on 19 August 2015

Niu Guannan (牛冠男; born 10 May 1992) is a Chinese water polo player.

She was part of the Chinese team at the 2015 World Aquatics Championships.

== See also ==
- China women's Olympic water polo team records and statistics
