= Roberta Bianconi =

Italian water polo player (born 1989)

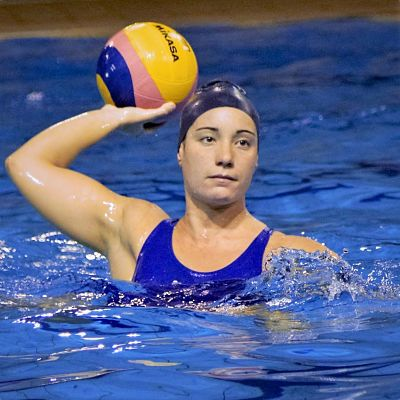

Personal information
- Nationality: Italian
- Born: 8 July 1989 (age 37) Rapallo, Liguria, Italy
- Height: 1.76 m (5 ft 9 in)
- Weight: 76 kg (168 lb)

Sport
- Country: Italy
- Sport: Water polo
- Club: Ekipe Orizzonte
Medal record
Olympic Games
Silver medal – second place	2016 Rio de Janeiro	Team
World Championships
Bronze medal – third place	2015 Kazan	Team
Bronze medal – third place	2023 Fukuoka	Team
European Championships
Gold medal – first place	2012 Eindhoven
Bronze medal – third place	2016 Belgrade
Bronze medal – third place	2022 Split
FINA World League
Silver medal – second place	2011 Tianjin
Silver medal – second place	2014 Kunshan
Silver medal – second place	2019 Budapest

Roberta Bianconi (born 8 July 1989) is an Italian water polo player. She was part of the Italian team that won the silver medal at the 2016 Olympics and the bronze medal at the 2015 World Championships.

Bianconi was named 2015 and 2016 LEN European Water Polo Player of the Year being the first female player to be awarded by LEN in multiple times.

== Club career ==
- 2007–2011 Rapallo
- 2011–2012 Pro Recco
- 2012–2013 RN Bogliasco
- 2013–2014 Rapallo
- 2014–2017 Olympiacos Piraeus
- 2017– Ekipe Orizzonte

== Club honours ==
Rapallo

- LEN Trophy
  - 2011
- Coppa Italia
  - 2014

Pro Recco

- LEN Euro League
  - 2012
- LEN Super Cup
  - 2011
- Serie A1
  - 2012

Olympiacos

- LEN Euro League
  - 2015
- LEN Super Cup
  - 2015
- Greek Championships
  - 2015, 2016 and 2017

Ekipe Orizzonte

- LEN Trophy
  - 2019
- Serie A1
  - 2019
- Coppa Italia
  - 2018

== See also ==
- List of Olympic medalists in water polo (women)
- List of World Aquatics Championships medalists in water polo

Awards
Preceded by (Spain) Maica García	LEN European Water Polo Player of the Year; 2015; 2016	Succeeded by (Spain) Laura Ester
