= 2009 FINA Women's Water Polo World League =

- League: FINA Water Polo World League
- Sport: Water Polo

Super Final
- Finals champions: United States (4th title)
- Runners-up: Canada

FINA Women's Water Polo World League seasons
- ← 2008 2010 →

The 2009 FINA Women's Water Polo World League was the 6th edition of the event, organised by the world's governing body in aquatics, the International Swimming Federation (FINA). After playing in groups within the same continent, eight teams qualified to play in a final tournament, called the Super Final in Kirishi, Russia from 9 to 14 June 2009.

== Super Final ==
- June 9–14, 2009, Kirishi, Russia

=== Seeding ===
Group A	Group B
United States; China; Russia; Italy	Canada; Australia; Spain; Greece

=== Knockout stage ===
5th–8th place bracket

5th–8th place classification
13 June
China	11
Italy	9
13 June
Russia	11
Greece	8

5th place match
14 June
Russia	9
China	10
7th place match
14 June
Greece	13
Italy	6

Championship bracket

Semifinals
13 June
Spain	7
Canada	10
13 June
Australia	8
United States	9

Gold medal match
14 June
Canada	6
United States	9
Bronze medal match
14 June
Spain	8
Australia	12

==== Semifinals ====
13 June 2009	Spain	7–10	Canada	Kirishi, Russia
13 June 2009	Score by quarters: 1–1, 3–2, 1–2, 2–5			Kirishi, Russia

13 June 2009	Australia	8–9	United States	Kirishi, Russia
13 June 2009	Score by quarters: 3–1, 1–2, 3–4, 1–2			Kirishi, Russia

==== Bronze medal match ====
14 June 2009	Spain	8–12	Australia	Kirishi, Russia
14 June 2009	Score by quarters: 4–4, 1–3, 2–2, 1–3			Kirishi, Russia

==== Gold medal match ====
14 June 2009	Canada	6–9	United States	Kirishi, Russia
14 June 2009	Score by quarters: 1–2, 2–2, 2–5, 1–0			Kirishi, Russia

=== Final ranking ===
Rank	Team
Gold medal	United States
Silver medal	Canada
Bronze medal	Australia
4	Spain
5	China
6	Russia
7	Greece
8	Italy

2009 Women's FINA Water Polo World League

United States
4th title

Team Roster

Betsey Armstrong, Heather Petri, Brittany Hayes, Brenda Villa (C), Lauren Wenger, Tanya Gandy, Kelly Rulon, Jessica Steffens, Elsie Windes, Alison Gregorka, Kami Craig, Annika Dries, Jaime Komer, Erika Figge, Lolo Silver. Head coach: Adam Krikorian.

== Individual awards ==
- Top Scorer
  - Blanca Gil (ESP) — 15 goals
