= List of world champions in women's water polo =

This is a list of world champions in women's water polo since the inaugural official edition in 1986.

== Abbreviations ==
#	Ordering by name or by tournament	Cap No.	Cap number	Rk	Rank
(C)	Captain	L/R	Handedness	Ref	Reference
Pos	Playing position	FP	Field player	GK	Goalkeeper
CB	Center back	CF	Center forward	D	Driver
ISHOF	International Swimming Hall of Fame	p.	page	pp.	pages

== History ==
The 1986 Women's World Water Polo Championship was the first edition of the women's water polo tournament at the World Aquatics Championships, organized by the world governing body in aquatics, the FINA.

As of 2025, women's water polo teams from seven countries won all 18 tournaments.

Greece is the current world champion. United States is the most successful country in women's water polo tournament at the World Aquatics Championships, with eight gold medals.

Legend

- D – Debut
- C – Champion
- C – Winning streak (winning three or more world championships in a row)
- – Hosts

Champion	1986	1991	1994	1998	2001	2003	2005	2007	2009	2011	2013	2015	2017	2019	2022	2023	2024	2025	Total
Australia	C																		1
Greece				D						C								C	2
Hungary	D		C				C												2
Italy			D	C	C														2
Netherlands	D	C														C			2
Spain				D							C								1
United States	D					C		C	C			C	C	C	C		C		8
Champion	1986	1991	1994	1998	2001	2003	2005	2007	2009	2011	2013	2015	2017	2019	2022	2023	2024	2025	Total

== Team statistics ==
=== Results ===
The following table shows results of world champions in women's water polo by tournament.

Legend

- 6 – Winning 6 matches during the tournament
- 4 – Drawing 4 matches during the tournament
- 2 – Losing 2 matches during the tournament
- 100.0% – Winning all matches during the tournament
- team – Winning streak (winning three or more world championships in a row)
- – Host team
- ^{†} – Defunct team

Abbreviation

- MP – Matches played
- W – Won
- D – Drawn
- L – Lost
- GF – Goals for
- GA – Goals against
- GD – Goals difference
- GF/MP – Goals for per match
- GA/MP – Goals against per match
- GD/MP – Goals difference per match

Results of champions by tournament
#	Women's tournament	Champion	MP	W	D	L	Win %	GF	GA	GD	GF/MP	GA/MP	GD/MP
1	Madrid 1986	Australia (1st title)	7	7	0	0	100.0%	83	36	47	11.857	5.143	6.714
2	Perth 1991	Netherlands (1st title)	6	6	0	0	100.0%	71	47	24	11.833	7.833	4.000
3	Rome 1994	Hungary (1st title)	7	6	0	1	85.7%	55	38	17	7.857	5.429	2.429
4	Perth 1998	Italy (1st title)	8	5	0	3	62.5%	77	57	20	9.625	7.125	2.500
5	Fukuoka 2001	Italy (2nd title)	8	6	1	1	75.0%	77	45	32	9.625	5.625	4.000
6	Barcelona 2003	United States (1st title)	6	6	0	0	100.0%	62	31	31	10.333	5.167	5.167
7	Montreal 2005	Hungary (2nd title)	6	6	0	0	100.0%	64	35	29	10.667	5.833	4.833
8	Melbourne 2007	United States (2nd title)	6	6	0	0	100.0%	56	38	18	9.333	6.333	3.000
9	Rome 2009	United States (3rd title)	7	6	0	1	85.7%	77	53	24	11.000	7.571	3.429
10	Shanghai 2011	Greece (1st title)	6	6	0	0	100.0%	62	51	11	10.333	8.500	1.833
11	Barcelona 2013	Spain (1st title)	6	5	0	1	83.3%	88	53	35	14.667	8.833	5.833
12	Kazan 2015	United States (4th title)	7	6	0	1	85.7%	72	36	36	10.286	5.143	5.143
13	Budapest 2017	United States (5th title)	6	6	0	0	100.0%	92	37	55	15.333	6.167	9.167
14	Gwangju 2019	United States (6th title)	6	6	0	0	100.0%	93	26	67	15.500	4.333	11.167
15	Budapest 2022	United States (7th title)	6	6	0	0	100.0%	94	33	61	15.667	5.500	10.167
16	Fukuoka 2023	Netherlands (2nd title)	6	6	0	0	100.0%	104	50	54	17.333	8.333	9.000
17	Doha 2024	United States (8th title)	6	6	0	0	100.0%	92	41	51	15.333	6.833	8.500
18	Singapore 2025	Greece (2nd title)	7	6	0	1	85.7%	122	67	55	17.429	9.571	7.857
#	Women's tournament	Total	117	107	1	9	91.5%	1441	774	667	12.316	6.615	5.701
#	Women's tournament	Champion	MP	W	D	L	Win %	GF	GA	GD	GF/MP	GA/MP	GD/MP

Sources:

- Official Reports (FINA) (PDF): "World Championship" (p. 57);
- Todor66: "Women's Water Polo World Championship".

The following table shows women's teams that won all matches during the tournament.

Winning all matches during the tournament
#	Year	Champion	MP	W	D	L	Win %
1	1986	Australia (1st title)	7	7	0	0	100.0%
2	1991	Netherlands (1st title)	6	6	0	0	100.0%
3	2003	United States (1st title)	6	6	0	0	100.0%
4	2005	Hungary (2nd title)	6	6	0	0	100.0%
5	2007	United States (2nd title)	6	6	0	0	100.0%
6	2011	Greece (1st title)	6	6	0	0	100.0%
7	2017	United States (5th title)	6	6	0	0	100.0%
8	2019	United States (6th title)	6	6	0	0	100.0%
9	2022	United States (7th title)	6	6	0	0	100.0%
10	2023	Netherlands (2nd title)	6	6	0	0	100.0%
11	2024	United States (8th title)	6	6	0	0	100.0%
#	Year	Champion	MP	W	D	L	Win %

The following tables show records of goals for per match.

Top 5 most goals for per match
Rk	Year	Champion	MP	GF	GF/MP
1	2025	Greece (2nd title)	7	122	17.429
2	2023	Netherlands (2nd title)	6	104	17.333
3	2022	United States (7th title)	6	94	15.667
4	2019	United States (6th title)	6	93	15.500
5	2017	United States (5th title)	6	92	15.333
5	2024	United States (8th title)	6	92	15.333

Top 5 fewest goals for per match
Rk	Year	Champion	MP	GF	GF/MP
1	1994	Hungary (1st title)	7	55	7.857
2	2007	United States (2nd title)	6	56	9.333
3	1998	Italy (1st title)	8	77	9.625
3	2001	Italy (2nd title)	8	77	9.625
5	2015	United States (4th title)	7	72	10.286

Historical progression of records – goals for per match
Goals for per match	Achievement	Year	Champion	Date of winning gold	Duration of record
11.857	Set record	1986	Australia (1st title)	22 August 1986	26 years, 345 days
14.667	Broke record	2013	Spain (1st title)	2 August 2013	3 years, 360 days
15.333	Broke record	2017	United States (5th title)	28 July 2017	1 year, 363 days
15.500	Broke record	2019	United States (6th title)	26 July 2019	2 years, 341 days
15.667	Broke record	2022	United States (7th title)	2 July 2022	1 year, 26 days
17.333	Broke record	2023	Netherlands (2nd title)	28 July 2023	1 year, 360 days
17.429	Broke record	2025	Greece (2nd title)	23 July 2025	220 days

The following tables show records of goals against per match.

Top 5 most goals against per match
Rk	Year	Champion	MP	GA	GA/MP
1	2025	Greece (2nd title)	7	67	9.571
2	2013	Spain (1st title)	6	53	8.833
3	2011	Greece (1st title)	6	51	8.500
4	2023	Netherlands (2nd title)	6	50	8.333
5	1991	Netherlands (1st title)	6	47	7.833

Top 5 fewest goals against per match
Rk	Year	Champion	MP	GA	GA/MP
1	2019	United States (6th title)	6	26	4.333
2	1986	Australia (1st title)	7	36	5.143
2	2015	United States (4th title)	7	36	5.143
4	2003	United States (1st title)	6	31	5.167
5	1994	Hungary (1st title)	7	38	5.429

The following tables show records of goals difference per match.

Top 5 most goals difference per match
Rk	Year	Champion	MP	GD	GD/MP
1	2019	United States (6th title)	6	67	11.167
2	2022	United States (7th title)	6	61	10.167
3	2017	United States (5th title)	6	55	9.167
4	2023	Netherlands (2nd title)	6	54	9.000
5	2024	United States (8th title)	6	51	8.500

Top 5 fewest goals difference per match
Rk	Year	Champion	MP	GD	GD/MP
1	2011	Greece (1st title)	6	11	1.833
2	1994	Hungary (1st title)	7	17	2.429
3	1998	Italy (1st title)	8	20	2.500
4	2007	United States (2nd title)	6	18	3.000
5	2009	United States (3rd title)	7	24	3.429

=== Olympic and world champions (teams) ===
The following table is pre-sorted by number of Olympic titles (in descending order), number of world titles (in descending order), name of the team (in ascending order), respectively. Last updated: 27 August2024.

As of 2024, there are five women's national water polo teams that won gold medals at the Summer Olympics and the World Aquatics Championships.

Legend

- Year^{*} – As host team

#	Champions	Olympic title	World title	Total	First	Last
1	United States	3 (2012–2016–2020)	8 (2003, 2007–2009, 2015–2017–2019–2022, 2024)	11	2003	2024
2	Italy	1 (2004)	2 (1998–2001)	3	1998	2004
2	Netherlands	1 (2008)	2 (1991, 2023)	3	1991	2023
5	Australia	1 (2000^{*})	1 (1986)	2	1986	2000
5	Spain	1 (2024)	1 (2013^{*})	2	2013	2024

== Player statistics ==
=== Age records ===
The following tables show the oldest and youngest female world champions in water polo.

Legend

- – Host team

Top 10 oldest female world champions in water polo
Rk	Player	Age of winning gold	Women's team	Pos	Date of birth	Date of winning gold
1	Antiopi Melidoni	33 years, 291 days	Greece	FP	11 October 1977	29 July 2011
2	Monica Vaillant	33 years, 223 days	Italy	FP	16 December 1967	27 July 2001
3	Sabrina van der Sloot	32 years, 134 days	Netherlands	FP	16 March 1991	28 July 2023
4	Kaleigh Gilchrist	31 years, 276 days	United States	FP	16 May 1992	16 February 2024
5	Kyriaki Liosi	31 years, 272 days	Greece	FP	30 October 1979	29 July 2011
6	Carmela Allucci	31 years, 186 days	Italy	FP	22 January 1970	27 July 2001
7	Krisztina Zantleitner	31 years, 82 days	Hungary	FP	8 May 1974	29 July 2005
8	Georgia Lara	31 years, 59 days	Greece	FP	31 May 1980	29 July 2011
9	Heather Petri	31 years, 48 days	United States	FP	13 June 1978	31 July 2009
10	Mercédesz Stieber	30 years, 328 days	Hungary	FP	4 September 1974	29 July 2005
Rk	Player	Age of winning gold	Women's team	Pos	Date of birth	Date of winning gold

Top 10 youngest female world champions in water polo
Rk	Player	Age of winning gold	Women's team	Pos	Date of birth	Date of winning gold
1	Maddie Musselman	17 years, 52 days	United States	FP	16 June 1998	7 August 2015
2	Nefeli Anna Krassa	17 years, 196 days	Greece	FP	8 January 2008	23 July 2025
3	Eszter Tomaskovics	17 years, 340 days	Hungary	FP	23 August 1987	29 July 2005
4	Paige Hauschild	17 years, 345 days	United States	FP	17 August 1999	28 July 2017
5	Emily Ausmus	18 years, 66 days	United States	FP	12 December 2005	16 February 2024
6	Noémi Tóth	18 years, 94 days	Hungary	FP	7 June 1976	9 September 1994
7	Makenzie Fischer	18 years, 131 days	United States	FP	29 March 1997	7 August 2015
8	Aria Fischer	18 years, 148 days	United States	FP	2 March 1999	28 July 2017
9	Gabrielle Domanic	18 years, 151 days	United States	FP	24 February 1985	25 July 2003
10	Karin Kuipers	18 years, 178 days	Netherlands	FP	18 July 1972	12 January 1991
Rk	Player	Age of winning gold	Women's team	Pos	Date of birth	Date of winning gold

=== Multiple gold medalists ===
The following tables are pre-sorted by date of receiving the last gold medal (in ascending order), date of receiving the first gold medal (in ascending order), name of the player (in ascending order), respectively.

There are three female athletes who won five gold medals in water polo at the World Aquatics Championships.

Legend

- ^{*} – Host team

Female athletes who won five gold medals in water polo at the World Aquatics Championships
Year	Player	Date of birth	Height	Women's team	Pos	World titles	Age of first/last
2024	Rachel Fattal	10 December 1993	1.73 m (5 ft 8 in)	United States	FP	2015–2017–2019–2022, 2024	21/30
2024	Maddie Musselman	16 June 1998	1.81 m (5 ft 11 in)	United States	FP	2015–2017–2019–2022, 2024	17/25
2024	Maggie Steffens	4 June 1993	1.73 m (5 ft 8 in)	United States	FP	2015–2017–2019–2022, 2024	22/30
Year	Player	Date of birth	Height	Women's team	Pos	World titles	Age of first/last

There are three female athletes who won four gold medals in water polo at the World Aquatics Championships.

Legend

- ^{*} – Host team

Female athletes who won four gold medals in water polo at the World Aquatics Championships
Year	Player	Date of birth	Height	Women's team	Pos	World titles	Age of first/last
2024	Kaleigh Gilchrist	16 May 1992	1.76 m (5 ft 9 in)	United States	FP	2015, 2019–2022, 2024	23/31
2024	Ashleigh Johnson	12 September 1994	1.86 m (6 ft 1 in)	United States	GK	2015, 2019–2022, 2024	20/29
2024	Amanda Longan	16 January 1997	1.85 m (6 ft 1 in)	United States	GK	2017–2019–2022, 2024	20/27
Year	Player	Date of birth	Height	Women's team	Pos	World titles	Age of first/last

There are eight female athletes who won three gold medals in water polo at the World Aquatics Championships.

Legend

- ^{*} – Host team

Female athletes who won three gold medals in water polo at the World Aquatics Championships
Year	Player	Date of birth	Height	Women's team	Pos	World titles	Age of first/last
2009	Heather Petri	13 June 1978	1.80 m (5 ft 11 in)	United States	FP	2003, 2007–2009	25/31
2009	Brenda Villa	18 April 1980	1.63 m (5 ft 4 in)	United States	FP	2003, 2007–2009	23/29
2015	Kami Craig	21 July 1987	1.84 m (6 ft 0 in)	United States	FP	2007–2009, 2015	19/28
2019	Makenzie Fischer	29 March 1997	1.86 m (6 ft 1 in)	United States	FP	2015–2017–2019	18/22
2019	Kiley Neushul	5 March 1993	1.73 m (5 ft 8 in)	United States	FP	2015–2017–2019	22/26
2019	Melissa Seidemann	26 June 1990	1.83 m (6 ft 0 in)	United States	FP	2015–2017–2019	25/29
2019	Alys Williams	28 May 1994	1.81 m (5 ft 11 in)	United States	FP	2015–2017–2019	21/25
2024	Jordan Raney	2 June 1996	1.78 m (5 ft 10 in)	United States	FP	2017, 2022, 2024	21/27
Year	Player	Date of birth	Height	Women's team	Pos	World titles	Age of first/last

There are twenty six female athletes who won two gold medals in water polo at the World Aquatics Championships.

Legend

- ^{*} – Host team

Female athletes who won two gold medals in water polo at the World Aquatics Championships
Year	Player	Date of birth	Height	Women's team	Pos	World titles	Age of first/last
2001	Carmela Allucci	22 January 1970	1.67 m (5 ft 6 in)	Italy	FP	1998–2001	27/31
2001	Alexandra Araújo	13 July 1972	1.67 m (5 ft 6 in)	Italy	FP	1998–2001	25/29
2001	Cristina Consoli			Italy	FP	1998–2001	
2001	Francesca Conti	21 May 1972	1.79 m (5 ft 10 in)	Italy	GK	1998–2001	25/29
2001	Melania Grego	19 June 1973	1.71 m (5 ft 7 in)	Italy	FP	1998–2001	24/28
2001	Giusi Malato	9 July 1971	1.70 m (5 ft 7 in)	Italy	FP	1998–2001	26/30
2001	Martina Miceli	22 October 1973	1.68 m (5 ft 6 in)	Italy	FP	1998–2001	24/27
2001	Maddalena Musumeci	26 March 1976	1.70 m (5 ft 7 in)	Italy	FP	1998–2001	21/25
2001	Monica Vaillant	16 December 1967	1.73 m (5 ft 8 in)	Italy	FP	1998–2001	30/33
2005	Mercédesz Stieber	4 September 1974	1.74 m (5 ft 9 in)	Hungary	FP	1994, 2005	20/30
2007	Natalie Golda	28 December 1981	1.80 m (5 ft 11 in)	United States	FP	2003, 2007	21/25
2007	Ericka Lorenz	18 February 1981	1.80 m (5 ft 11 in)	United States	FP	2003, 2007	22/26
2009	Elizabeth Armstrong	31 January 1983	1.88 m (6 ft 2 in)	United States	GK	2007–2009	24/26
2009	Alison Gregorka	29 June 1985	1.78 m (5 ft 10 in)	United States	FP	2007–2009	21/24
2009	Brittany Hayes	7 February 1985	1.70 m (5 ft 7 in)	United States	FP	2007–2009	22/24
2009	Jaime Komer (Hipp)	1 September 1981	1.83 m (6 ft 0 in)	United States	GK	2007–2009	25/27
2009	Moriah van Norman	30 May 1984	1.78 m (5 ft 10 in)	United States	FP	2007–2009	22/25
2009	Lauren Wenger	11 March 1984	1.91 m (6 ft 3 in)	United States	FP	2007–2009	23/25
2009	Elsie Windes	17 June 1985	1.78 m (5 ft 10 in)	United States	FP	2007–2009	21/24
2019	Aria Fischer	2 March 1999	1.83 m (6 ft 0 in)	United States	FP	2017–2019	18/20
2019	Paige Hauschild	17 August 1999	1.78 m (5 ft 10 in)	United States	FP	2017–2019	17/19
2022	Stephania Haralabidis	19 May 1995	1.80 m (5 ft 11 in)	United States	FP	2019–2022	24/27
2024	Denise Mammolito	12 September 1998	1.85 m (6 ft 1 in)	United States	FP	2022, 2024	23/25
2024	Ryann Neushul	30 December 1999	1.71 m (5 ft 7 in)	United States	FP	2022, 2024	22/24
2024	Tara Prentice	20 December 1997	1.83 m (6 ft 0 in)	United States	FP	2022, 2024	24/26
2024	Bayley Weber	27 June 2000	1.78 m (5 ft 10 in)	United States	FP	2022, 2024	22/23
Year	Player	Date of birth	Height	Women's team	Pos	World titles	Age of first/last

=== Olympic and world champions (players) ===
The following tables are pre-sorted by number of Olympic titles (in descending order), number of world titles (in descending order), year of receiving the last gold medal (in ascending order), year of receiving the first gold medal (in ascending order), name of the player (in ascending order), respectively. Last updated: 27 February 2024.

As of 2024, there are thirty five female athletes who won gold medals in water polo at the Summer Olympics and the World Aquatics Championships.

Legend

- Year^{*} – As host team

Female water polo players who won two or more Olympic titles and one or more world titles
#	Player	Birth	Height	Pos	Summer Olympics			World Aquatics Championships			Total titles	ISHOF member
#	Player	Birth	Height	Pos	Age	Women's team	Title	Age	Women's team	Title	Total titles	ISHOF member
1	Maggie Steffens	1993	1.73 m (5 ft 8 in)	FP	19–23–28	United States	2012–2016–2020	22–24–26–29, 30	United States	2015–2017–2019–2022, 2024	8	
2	Melissa Seidemann	1990	1.83 m (6 ft 0 in)	FP	22–26–31	United States	2012–2016–2020	25–27–29	United States	2015–2017–2019	6	
3	Rachel Fattal	1993	1.73 m (5 ft 8 in)	FP	22–27	United States	2016–2020	21–23–25–28, 30	United States	2015–2017–2019–2022, 2024	7	
3	Maddie Musselman	1998	1.81 m (5 ft 11 in)	FP	18–23	United States	2016–2020	17–19–21–24, 25	United States	2015–2017–2019–2022, 2024	7	
5	Kaleigh Gilchrist	1992	1.76 m (5 ft 9 in)	FP	24–29	United States	2016–2020	23, 27–30, 31	United States	2015, 2019–2022, 2024	6	
5	Ashleigh Johnson	1994	1.86 m (6 ft 1 in)	GK	21–26	United States	2016–2020	20, 24–27, 29	United States	2015, 2019–2022, 2024	6	
7	Kami Craig	1987	1.81 m (5 ft 11 in)	FP	25–29	United States	2012–2016	19–22, 28	United States	2007–2009, 2015	5	
8	Makenzie Fischer	1997	1.86 m (6 ft 1 in)	FP	19–24	United States	2016–2020	18–20–22	United States	2015–2017–2019	5	
9	Aria Fischer	1999	1.83 m (6 ft 0 in)	FP	17–22	United States	2016–2020	18–20	United States	2017–2019	4	
10	Courtney Mathewson	1986	1.71 m (5 ft 7 in)	FP	25–29	United States	2012–2016	28	United States	2015	3	

Female water polo players who won an Olympic title and two or more world titles
#	Player	Birth	Height	Pos	Summer Olympics			World Aquatics Championships			Total titles	ISHOF member
#	Player	Birth	Height	Pos	Age	Women's team	Title	Age	Women's team	Title	Total titles	ISHOF member
11	Amanda Longan	1997	1.85 m (6 ft 1 in)	GK	24	United States	2020	20–22–25, 27	United States	2017–2019–2022, 2024	5	
12	Heather Petri	1978	1.80 m (5 ft 11 in)	FP	34	United States	2012	25, 28–31	United States	2003, 2007–2009	4	2023
12	Brenda Villa	1980	1.63 m (5 ft 4 in)	FP	32	United States	2012	23, 26–29	United States	2003, 2007–2009	4	2018
14	Kiley Neushul	1993	1.73 m (5 ft 8 in)	FP	23	United States	2016	22–24–26	United States	2015–2017–2019	4	
15	Alys Williams	1994	1.81 m (5 ft 11 in)	FP	27	United States	2020	21–23–25	United States	2015–2017–2019	4	
16	Carmela Allucci	1970	1.67 m (5 ft 6 in)	FP	34	Italy	2004	27–31	Italy	1998–2001	3	
16	Alexandra Araújo	1972	1.67 m (5 ft 6 in)	FP	32	Italy	2004	25–29	Italy	1998–2001	3	
16	Francesca Conti	1972	1.79 m (5 ft 10 in)	GK	32	Italy	2004	25–29	Italy	1998–2001	3	
16	Melania Grego	1973	1.71 m (5 ft 7 in)	FP	31	Italy	2004	24–28	Italy	1998–2001	3	
16	Giusi Malato	1971	1.70 m (5 ft 7 in)	FP	33	Italy	2004	26–30	Italy	1998–2001	3	
16	Martina Miceli	1973	1.68 m (5 ft 6 in)	FP	30	Italy	2004	24–27	Italy	1998–2001	3	
16	Maddalena Musumeci	1976	1.70 m (5 ft 7 in)	FP	28	Italy	2004	21–25	Italy	1998–2001	3	
23	Elizabeth Armstrong	1983	1.88 m (6 ft 2 in)	GK	29	United States	2012	24–26	United States	2007–2009	3	
23	Lauren Wenger	1984	1.91 m (6 ft 3 in)	FP	28	United States	2012	23–25	United States	2007–2009	3	
23	Elsie Windes	1985	1.78 m (5 ft 10 in)	FP	27	United States	2012	21–24	United States	2007–2009	3	
26	Paige Hauschild	1999	1.78 m (5 ft 10 in)	FP	21	United States	2020	17–19	United States	2017–2019	3	
27	Stephania Haralabidis	1995	1.80 m (5 ft 11 in)	FP	26	United States	2020	24–27	United States	2019–2022	3	
#	Player	Birth	Height	Pos	Age	Women's team	Title	Age	Women's team	Title	Total titles	ISHOF member
#	Player	Birth	Height	Pos	Summer Olympics			World Aquatics Championships			Total titles	ISHOF member

Female water polo players who won an Olympic title and a world title
#	Player	Birth	Height	Pos	Summer Olympics			World Aquatics Championships			Total titles	ISHOF member
#	Player	Birth	Height	Pos	Age	Women's team	Title	Age	Women's team	Title	Total titles	ISHOF member
28	Debbie Watson	1965	1.78 m (5 ft 10 in)	FP	34	Australia	2000^{*}	20	Australia	1986	2	2008
29	Noémi Tóth	1976	1.80 m (5 ft 11 in)	FP	28	Italy	2004	18	Hungary	1994	2	
30	Silvia Bosurgi	1979	1.65 m (5 ft 5 in)	FP	25	Italy	2004	22	Italy	2001	2	
30	Tania Di Mario	1979	1.67 m (5 ft 6 in)	FP	25	Italy	2004	22	Italy	2001	2	
32	Kelly Rulon	1984	1.78 m (5 ft 10 in)	FP	27	United States	2012	24	United States	2009	2	
32	Jessica Steffens	1987	1.83 m (6 ft 0 in)	FP	25	United States	2012	22	United States	2009	2	
34	Samantha Hill	1992	1.83 m (6 ft 0 in)	GK	24	United States	2016	23	United States	2015	2	
35	Jamie Neushul	1995	1.68 m (5 ft 6 in)	FP	26	United States	2020	22	United States	2017	2	
#	Player	Birth	Height	Pos	Age	Women's team	Title	Age	Women's team	Title	Total titles	ISHOF member
#	Player	Birth	Height	Pos	Summer Olympics			World Aquatics Championships			Total titles	ISHOF member

=== World champion families ===
The following tables are pre-sorted by date of receiving the gold medal (in ascending order), name of the player (in ascending order), respectively.

Legend

- ^{*} – Host team

Relationship	Family	Player	Date of birth	Height	Women's team	Pos	World title	Age	Note	Ref
Three sisters	Neushul	Kiley Neushul	5 March 1993	1.73 m (5 ft 8 in)	United States	FP	2015–2017–2019	22–24–26		
Three sisters	Neushul	Jamie Neushul	12 May 1995	1.68 m (5 ft 6 in)	United States	FP	2017	22	Two sisters in a tournament	
Three sisters	Neushul	Ryann Neushul	30 December 1999	1.71 m (5 ft 7 in)	United States	FP	2022, 2024	22, 24		
Two sisters	Meloncelli	Megan Meloncelli			Australia		1986		Two sisters in a tournament	
Two sisters	Meloncelli	Wendy Meloncelli			Australia		1986		Two sisters in a tournament	
Two sisters	Steffens	Jessica Steffens	7 April 1987	1.83 m (6 ft 0 in)	United States	FP	2009	22		
Two sisters	Steffens	Maggie Steffens	4 June 1993	1.75 m (5 ft 9 in)	United States	FP	2015–2017–2019–2022, 2024	22–24–26–29, 30		
Two sisters	Fischer	Makenzie Fischer	29 March 1997	1.86 m (6 ft 1 in)	United States	FP	2015	18		
Two sisters	Fischer	Makenzie Fischer	29 March 1997	1.86 m (6 ft 1 in)	United States	FP	2017–2019	20–22	Two sisters in a tournament	
Two sisters	Fischer	Aria Fischer	2 March 1999	1.83 m (6 ft 0 in)	United States	FP	2017–2019	18–20	Two sisters in a tournament	
Two sisters	Rogge	Bente Rogge	2 October 1997	1.78 m (5 ft 10 in)	Netherlands	FP	2023	25	Two sisters in a tournament	
Two sisters	Rogge	Lieke Rogge	30 November 2000	1.76 m (5 ft 9 in)	Netherlands	FP	2023	22	Two sisters in a tournament	

== Coach statistics ==
=== Most successful coaches ===
The following table is pre-sorted by number of gold medals (in descending order), date of winning the last gold medal (in ascending order), name of the coach (in ascending order), respectively.

There are three coaches who led women's national water polo teams to win two or more gold medals at the World Aquatics Championships.

American Adam Krikorian led the United States women's national team to win six gold medals at the World Aquatics Championships. His compatriot Guy Baker guided the United States women's national team to two gold medals in 2003 and 2007.

Italian Pierluigi Formiconi coached the Italy women's national team to two consecutive gold medals at the World Aquatics Championships in 1998 and 2001.

Legend

- ^{*} – Host team

Head coaches who led women's national teams to win two or more gold medals at the World Aquatics Championships
Rk	Head coach	Nationality	Birth	Age	Women's team	World titles	Total	Ref
1	Adam Krikorian	United States	1974	35, 41–47, 49	United States	2009, 2015–2017–2019–2022, 2024	6	
2	Pierluigi Formiconi	Italy	1948	49–53	Italy	1998–2001	2	
2	Guy Baker	United States			United States	2003, 2007	2	

=== Champions as coach and player ===
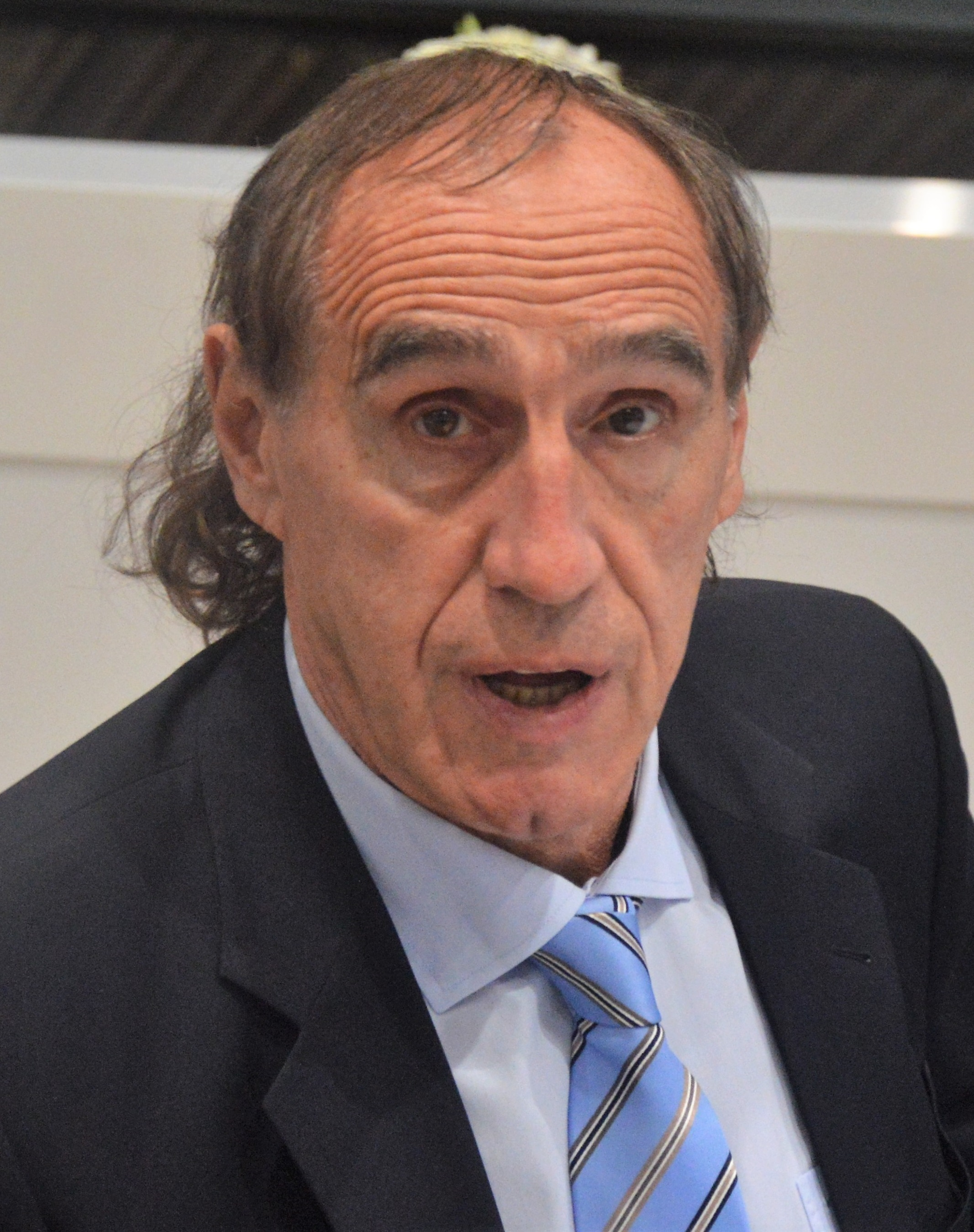
Tamás Faragó of Hungary is a dual world champion as coach and player.

The following table is pre-sorted by number of gold medals (in descending order), date of winning the last gold medal (in ascending order), name of the person (in ascending order), respectively.

Only one water polo player won a gold medal at the World Aquatics Championships and then guided a women's national water polo team to the world title as a head coach.

Tamás Faragó of Hungary won a gold medal at the 1973 World Aquatics Championships. Thirty-two years later, he coached the Hungary women's national team to the world title in 2005.

Legend

- ^{*} – Host team

Rk	Person	Birth	Height	Player				Head coach			Total titles	Ref
Rk	Person	Birth	Height	Age	Men's team	Pos	Title	Age	Women's team	Title	Total titles	Ref
1	Tamás Faragó	1952	1.94 m (6 ft 4 in)	21	Hungary	FP	1973	52	Hungary	2005	2	

=== Olympic and world champions (coaches) ===
The following table is pre-sorted by number of Olympic titles (in descending order), number of world titles (in descending order), year of winning the last gold medal (in ascending order), year of winning the first gold medal (in ascending order), name of the coach (in ascending order), respectively. Last updated: 27 February 2024.

As of 2024, there are two head coaches who led women's national teams to win gold medals in water polo at the Summer Olympics and the World Aquatics Championships.

Legend

- Year^{*} – As host team

Head coaches who led women's national teams to win gold medals in water polo at the Summer Olympics and the World Aquatics Championships
#	Coach	Nationality	Birth	Summer Olympics			World Aquatics Championships			Total titles	ISHOF member	Ref
#	Coach	Nationality	Birth	Age	Women's team	Title	Age	Women's team	Title	Total titles	ISHOF member	Ref
1	Adam Krikorian	United States	1974	38–47	United States	2012–2016–2020	35, 41–47, 49	United States	2009, 2015–2017–2019–2022, 2024	9		
2	Pierluigi Formiconi	Italy	1948	56	Italy	2004	49–53	Italy	1998–2001	3		

== Champions by tournament ==
=== 2019 (United States, 6th title) ===
- Edition of women's tournament: 14th
- Host city: Gwangju, South Korea
- Number of participating teams: 16
- Competition format: Round-robin pools advanced teams to classification matches
- Champion: United States (6th title; 1st place in preliminary A group)

Results
Match	Round	Date	Cap color	Opponent	Result	Goals for	Goals against	Goals diff.
Match 1/6	Preliminary round – Group A	14 July 2019	Blue	New Zealand	Won	22	3	19
Match 2/6	Preliminary round – Group A	16 July 2019	White	Netherlands	Won	12	9	3
Match 3/6	Preliminary round – Group A	18 July 2019	Blue	South Africa	Won	26	1	25
Match 4/6	Quarter-finals	22 July 2019	White	Greece	Won	15	5	10
Match 5/6	Semi-finals	24 July 2019	White	Australia	Won	7	2	5
Match 6/6	Gold medal match	26 July 2019	White	Spain	Won	11	6	5
Total	Matches played: 6 • Wins: 6 • Ties: 0 • Defeats: 0 • Win %: 100%					93	26	67

Source: Official Results Books (PDF): 2019 (Women's Competition Schedule, Women's Round Summary).

- Head coach: (United States) Adam Krikorian (4th title as head coach)
- Assistant coach: (United States) Daniel Klatt

Roster
Cap No.	Player	Pos	L/R	Height	Weight	Date of birth	Age of winning gold	ISHOF member
1	Amanda Longan	GK	R	1.85 m (6 ft 1 in)		16 January 1997	22 years, 191 days	
2	Maddie Musselman	D	R	1.83 m (6 ft 0 in)		16 June 1998	21 years, 40 days	
3	Melissa Seidemann	CB	R	1.83 m (6 ft 0 in)		26 June 1990	29 years, 30 days	
4	Rachel Fattal	D	R	1.69 m (5 ft 7 in)		10 December 1993	25 years, 228 days	
5	Paige Hauschild	D	R	1.78 m (5 ft 10 in)		17 August 1999	19 years, 343 days	
6	Maggie Steffens (C)	D	R	1.75 m (5 ft 9 in)		4 June 1993	26 years, 52 days	
7	Stephania Haralabidis	D	R	1.80 m (5 ft 11 in)		19 May 1995	24 years, 68 days	
8	Kiley Neushul	D	R	1.73 m (5 ft 8 in)		5 March 1993	26 years, 143 days	
9	Aria Fischer	CF	R	1.83 m (6 ft 0 in)		2 March 1999	20 years, 146 days	
10	Kaleigh Gilchrist	D	R	1.75 m (5 ft 9 in)		16 May 1992	27 years, 71 days	
11	Makenzie Fischer	CB	R	1.86 m (6 ft 1 in)		29 March 1997	22 years, 119 days	
12	Alys Williams	CB	R	1.81 m (5 ft 11 in)		28 May 1994	25 years, 59 days	
13	Ashleigh Johnson	GK	R	1.86 m (6 ft 1 in)		12 September 1994	24 years, 317 days	
Average				1.80 m (5 ft 11 in)		4 May 1995	24 years, 83 days	
Coach	Adam Krikorian					22 July 1974	45 years, 4 days	

Note: Aria Fischer and Makenzie Fischer are sisters.
Sources:

- Official Results Books (PDF): 2019 (Team Roster – United States);
- ISHOF.

Abbreviation

- MP – Matches played
- Min – Minutes
- G – Goals
- Sh – Shots
- TF – Turnover fouls
- ST – Steals
- RB – Rebounds
- BL – Blocked shots
- SP – Sprints
- 20S – 20 seconds exclusion
- DE – Double exclusion
- Pen – Penalty
- EX – Exclusion

Statistics
Cap No.	Player	Pos	MP	Minutes played		Goals/Shots			TF	ST	RB	BL	Sprints			Personal fouls			
Cap No.	Player	Pos	MP	Min	%	G	Sh	%	TF	ST	RB	BL	Won	SP	%	20S	DE	Pen	EX
1	Amanda Longan	GK	6	66	34.4%					1									
2	Maddie Musselman	D	6	92	47.9%	13	23	56.5%	1	3		1	0	1	0.0%	1			
3	Melissa Seidemann	CB	6	88	45.8%	6	11	54.5%	6	3	2					2			
4	Rachel Fattal	D	6	119	62.0%	6	16	37.5%	3	1	3	6	7	9	77.8%	3		1	
5	Paige Hauschild	D	6	85	44.3%	7	11	63.6%	4	3	1	1				7		1	1
6	Maggie Steffens (C)	D	6	139	72.4%	7	18	38.9%	6	11	4					3			
7	Stephania Haralabidis	D	6	87	45.3%	12	19	63.2%	2	7	3		7	8	87.5%	3			
8	Kiley Neushul	D	6	123	64.1%	10	18	55.6%	6	6	4	2	2	5	40.0%	3			
9	Aria Fischer	CF	6	95	49.5%	10	21	47.6%	11	3	3	2	0	1	0.0%	2			
10	Kaleigh Gilchrist	D	6	109	56.8%	8	16	50.0%	7	2		2				4			
11	Makenzie Fischer	CB	6	116	60.4%	10	22	45.5%	3	4	3					8			
12	Alys Williams	CB	6	99	51.6%	4	12	33.3%	3	2	2	3				6		1	
13	Ashleigh Johnson	GK	6	126	65.6%	0	2	0.0%	2	8									
Team									9										
Total			6	192	100%	93	189	49.2%	63	54	25	17	16	24	66.7%	42	0	3	1
Against						26	132	19.7%	109	34	17	17	8	24	33.3%	52	0	5	5

Cap No.	Player	Pos	Saves/Shots		
Cap No.	Player	Pos	Saves	Shots	%
1	Amanda Longan	GK	16	27	59.3%
13	Ashleigh Johnson	GK	43	58	74.1%
Total			59	85	69.4%

Source: Official Results Books (PDF): 2019 (Cumulative Statistics – United States, p. 3).

=== 2017 (United States, 5th title) ===
- Edition of women's tournament: 13th
- Host city: Budapest, Hungary
- Number of participating teams: 16
- Competition format: Round-robin pools advanced teams to classification matches
- Champion: United States (5th title; 1st place in preliminary B group)

Results
Match	Round	Date	Cap color	Opponent	Result	Goals for	Goals against	Goals diff.
Match 1/6	Preliminary round – Group B	16 July 2017	Blue	South Africa	Won	24	2	22
Match 2/6	Preliminary round – Group B	18 July 2017	White	Spain	Won	12	8	4
Match 3/6	Preliminary round – Group B	20 July 2017	Blue	New Zealand	Won	22	7	15
Match 4/6	Quarter-finals	24 July 2017	White	Australia	Won	7	5	2
Match 5/6	Semi-finals	26 July 2017	Blue	Russia	Won	14	9	5
Match 6/6	Gold medal match	28 July 2017	White	Spain	Won	13	6	7
Total	Matches played: 6 • Wins: 6 • Ties: 0 • Defeats: 0 • Win %: 100%					92	37	55

Source: Official Results Books (PDF): 2017 (Women's Competition Schedule, Women's Round Summary).

- Head coach: (United States) Adam Krikorian (3rd title as head coach)
- Assistant coaches: (United States) Chris Oeding, (United States) Ethan Damato

Roster
Cap No.	Player	Pos	L/R	Height	Weight	Date of birth	Age of winning gold	ISHOF member
1	Gabrielle Stone	GK	R	1.83 m (6 ft 0 in)		7 March 1994	23 years, 143 days	
2	Maddie Musselman	D	R	1.83 m (6 ft 0 in)		16 June 1998	19 years, 42 days	
3	Melissa Seidemann	CB	R	1.83 m (6 ft 0 in)		26 June 1990	27 years, 32 days	
4	Rachel Fattal	D	R	1.69 m (5 ft 7 in)		10 December 1993	23 years, 230 days	
5	Paige Hauschild	D	R	1.78 m (5 ft 10 in)		17 August 1999	17 years, 345 days	
6	Maggie Steffens (C)	D	R	1.75 m (5 ft 9 in)		4 June 1993	24 years, 54 days	
7	Jordan Raney	CB	R	1.67 m (5 ft 6 in)		2 June 1996	21 years, 56 days	
8	Kiley Neushul	D	R	1.73 m (5 ft 8 in)		5 March 1993	24 years, 145 days	
9	Aria Fischer	CF	R	1.83 m (6 ft 0 in)		2 March 1999	18 years, 148 days	
10	Jamie Neushul	D	R	1.78 m (5 ft 10 in)		12 May 1995	22 years, 77 days	
11	Makenzie Fischer	CB	R	1.86 m (6 ft 1 in)		29 March 1997	20 years, 121 days	
12	Alys Williams	CB	R	1.81 m (5 ft 11 in)		28 May 1994	23 years, 61 days	
13	Amanda Longan	GK	R	1.85 m (6 ft 1 in)		16 January 1997	20 years, 193 days	
Average				1.79 m (5 ft 10 in)		11 August 1995	21 years, 351 days	
Coach	Adam Krikorian					22 July 1974	43 years, 6 days	

Note: Aria Fischer and Makenzie Fischer are sisters.
Sources:

- Official Results Books (PDF): 2017 (Team Roster – United States);
- ISHOF.

Abbreviation

- MP – Matches played
- Min – Minutes
- G – Goals
- Sh – Shots
- AS – Assists
- TF – Turnover fouls
- ST – Steals
- BL – Blocked shots
- SP – Sprints
- 20S – 20 seconds exclusion
- DE – Double exclusion
- Pen – Penalty
- EX – Exclusion

Statistics
Cap No.	Player	Pos	MP	Minutes played		Goals/Shots			AS	TF	ST	BL	Sprints			Personal fouls			
Cap No.	Player	Pos	MP	Min	%	G	Sh	%	AS	TF	ST	BL	Won	SP	%	20S	DE	Pen	EX
1	Gabrielle Stone	GK	6	164	85.4%	0	1	0.0%		1	2							1	
2	Maddie Musselman	D	6	116	60.4%	16	31	51.6%	8	4	3	2				3			
3	Melissa Seidemann	CB	6	113	58.9%	7	15	46.7%	3	10	2	1	0	1	0.0%	5			
4	Rachel Fattal	D	6	159	82.8%	14	23	60.9%	10	3	5	2	13	20	65.0%	4		1	
5	Paige Hauschild	D	6	54	28.1%	3	7	42.9%	2	2	3		0	1	0.0%	1			
6	Maggie Steffens (C)	D	6	136	70.8%	11	16	68.8%	14	10	5	1				5			
7	Jordan Raney	CB	6	70	36.5%	5	8	62.5%	2	4	3	1				6			
8	Kiley Neushul	D	6	153	79.7%	13	19	68.4%	8	4	11	3	1	1	100%	5			
9	Aria Fischer	CF	6	88	45.8%	5	12	41.7%	2	6	2	1	1	1	100%	2			
10	Jamie Neushul	D	6	65	33.9%	9	11	81.8%	7	3	4	1				4		1	
11	Makenzie Fischer	CB	6	115	59.9%	5	20	25.0%	2	2	6	1				9			1
12	Alys Williams	CB	6	82	42.7%	4	12	33.3%	3	2	1					4		1	
13	Amanda Longan	GK	6	28	14.6%						2								
Team										8									
Total			6	192	100%	92	175	52.6%	61	59	49	13	15	24	62.5%	48	0	4	1
Against						37	126	29.4%	23	101	34	7	9	24	37.5%	48	0	1	2

Cap No.	Player	Pos	Saves/Shots		
Cap No.	Player	Pos	Saves	Shots	%
1	Gabrielle Stone	GK	38	69	55.1%
13	Amanda Longan	GK	7	13	53.8%
Total			45	82	54.9%

Source: Official Results Books (PDF): 2017 (Cumulative Statistics – United States, p. 3).

=== 2015 (United States, 4th title) ===
- Edition of women's tournament: 12th
- Host city: Kazan, Russia
- Number of participating teams: 16
- Competition format: Round-robin pools advanced teams to classification matches
- Champion: United States (4th title; 2nd place in preliminary C group)

Results
Match	Round	Date	Cap color	Opponent	Result	Goals for	Goals against	Goals diff.
Match 1/7	Preliminary round – Group C	26 July 2015	Blue	Brazil	Won	13	2	11
Match 2/7	Preliminary round – Group C	28 July 2015	Blue	Italy	Lost	9	10	-1
Match 3/7	Preliminary round – Group C	30 July 2015	Blue	Japan	Won	17	2	15
Match 4/7	Quarter-final qualification	1 August 2015	White	Hungary	Won	12	7	5
Match 5/7	Quarter-finals	3 August 2015	Blue	Spain	Won	8	5	3
Match 6/7	Semi-finals	5 August 2015	White	Australia	Won	8	6	2
Match 7/7	Gold medal match	7 August 2015	White	Netherlands	Won	5	4	1
Total	Matches played: 7 • Wins: 6 • Ties: 0 • Defeats: -1 • Win %: 85.7%					72	36	36

Source: Official Results Books (PDF): 2015 (Women's Competition Schedule, Women's Round Summary).

- Head coach: (United States) Adam Krikorian (4th title as head coach)
- Assistant coaches: (United States) Daniel Klatt, (United States) Chris Oeding

Roster
Cap No.	Player	Pos	L/R	Height	Weight	Date of birth	Age of winning gold	ISHOF member
1	Samantha Hill	GK	R	1.81 m (5 ft 11 in)		8 June 1992	23 years, 60 days	
2	Maddie Musselman	D	R	1.83 m (6 ft 0 in)		16 June 1998	17 years, 52 days	
3	Melissa Seidemann	CB	R	1.83 m (6 ft 0 in)		26 June 1990	25 years, 42 days	
4	Rachel Fattal	D	R	1.69 m (5 ft 7 in)		10 December 1993	21 years, 240 days	
5	Alys Williams	CB	R	1.81 m (5 ft 11 in)		28 May 1994	21 years, 71 days	
6	Maggie Steffens (C)	D	R	1.75 m (5 ft 9 in)		4 June 1993	22 years, 64 days	
7	Courtney Mathewson	D	R	1.70 m (5 ft 7 in)		14 September 1986	28 years, 327 days	
8	Kiley Neushul	D	R	1.73 m (5 ft 8 in)		5 March 1993	22 years, 155 days	
9	Ashley Grossman	CF	R	1.81 m (5 ft 11 in)		27 May 1993	22 years, 72 days	
10	Kaleigh Gilchrist	D	R	1.75 m (5 ft 9 in)		16 May 1992	23 years, 83 days	
11	Makenzie Fischer	CB	R	1.86 m (6 ft 1 in)		29 March 1997	18 years, 131 days	
12	Kami Craig	CF	R	1.84 m (6 ft 0 in)		21 July 1987	28 years, 17 days	
13	Ashleigh Johnson	GK	R	1.86 m (6 ft 1 in)		12 September 1994	20 years, 329 days	
Average				1.79 m (5 ft 10 in)		11 December 1992	22 years, 239 days	
Coach	Adam Krikorian					22 July 1974	41 years, 16 days	

Sources:

- Official Results Books (PDF): 2015 (Team Roster – United States);
- ISHOF.

Abbreviation

- MP – Matches played
- Min – Minutes
- G – Goals
- Sh – Shots
- AS – Assists
- TF – Turnover fouls
- ST – Steals
- RB – Rebounds
- BL – Blocked shots
- SP – Sprints
- 20S – 20 seconds exclusion
- DE – Double exclusion
- Pen – Penalty
- EX – Exclusion

Statistics
Cap No.	Player	Pos	MP	Minutes played		Goals/Shots			AS	TF	ST	BL	SP won	Personal fouls			
Cap No.	Player	Pos	MP	Min	%	G	Sh	%	AS	TF	ST	BL	SP won	20S	DE	Pen	EX
1	Samantha Hill	GK	7	14	6.3%					1							
2	Maddie Musselman	D	7	105	46.9%	5	13	38.5%	3	4	1			5		1	1
3	Melissa Seidemann	CB	7	116	51.8%	3	16	18.8%	3	8	6	3		7			
4	Rachel Fattal	D	7	165	73.7%	18	33	54.5%	3	6	5	2	5	5		1	
5	Alys Williams	CB	7	66	29.5%	0	3	0.0%		2	1	1		5			
6	Maggie Steffens (C)	D	7	186	83.0%	13	27	48.1%	8	20	6	4		2		1	
7	Courtney Mathewson	D	7	142	63.4%	7	23	30.4%	3	3				3			
8	Kiley Neushul	D	7	175	78.1%	8	27	29.6%	7	11	2	5	11	6			
9	Ashley Grossman	CF	7	57	25.4%	4	8	50.0%		5	2			2	1		
10	Kaleigh Gilchrist	D	7	88	39.3%	2	7	28.6%	2	5	3	2		1			
11	Makenzie Fischer	CB	7	114	50.9%	6	16	37.5%	3	7	1	3		9			
12	Kami Craig	CF	7	131	58.5%	6	10	60.0%	1	8	1	1					
13	Ashleigh Johnson	GK	7	209	93.3%					1	12					1	
Team										14							
Total			7	224	100%	72	183	39.3%	33	95	40	21	16	45	1	4	1
Against						36	156	23.1%	19	112	24	20	12	49	1	3	2

Cap No.	Player	Pos	Saves/Shots		
Cap No.	Player	Pos	Saves	Shots	%
1	Samantha Hill	GK	2	4	50.0%
13	Ashleigh Johnson	GK	66	100	66.0%
Total			70	106	66.0%

Source: Official Results Books (PDF): 2015 (Cumulative Statistics – United States, p. 2).

=== 2013 (Spain, 1st title) ===
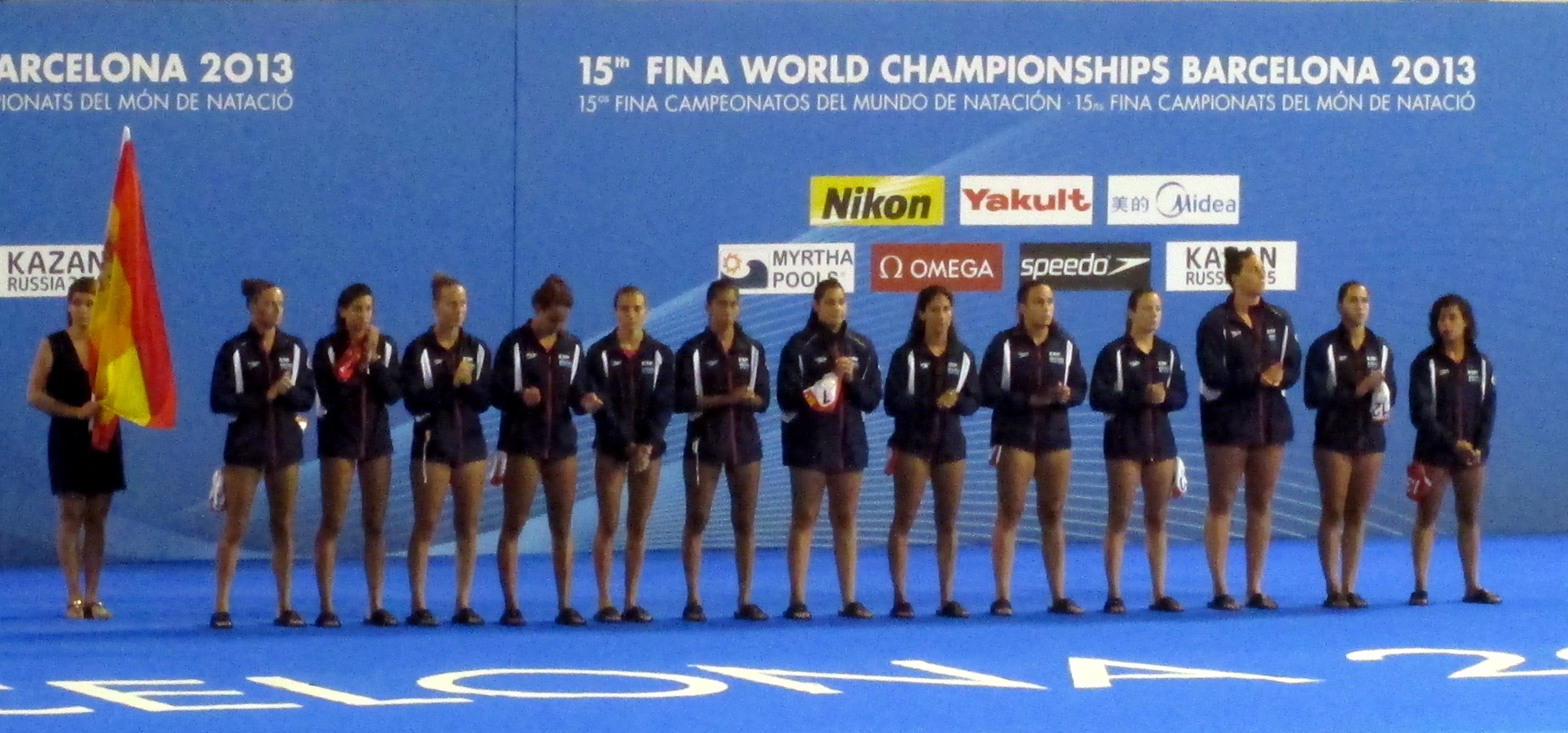
Line-up of the Spain women's national water polo team at the 2013 World Aquatics Championships. From left to right: Jennifer Pareja (captain), Laura Ester, Marta Bach, Anni Espar, Roser Tarragó, Matilde Ortiz, Lorena Miranda, María del Pilar Peña, Andrea Blas, Ona Meseguer, Maica García Godoy, Laura López, Patricia Herrera.

- Edition of women's tournament: 11th
- Host city: Barcelona, Spain
- Number of participating teams: 16
- Competition format: Round-robin pools advanced teams to classification matches
- Champion: Spain (1st title; 2nd place in preliminary A group)

Results
Match	Round	Date	Cap color	Opponent	Result	Goals for	Goals against	Goals diff.
Match 1/7	Preliminary round – Group A	21 July 2013	White	Netherlands	Won	14	12	2
Match 2/7	Preliminary round – Group A	23 July 2013	White	Russia	Lost	6	7	-1
Match 3/7	Preliminary round – Group A	25 July 2013	White	Uzbekistan	Won	20	4	16
Match 4/7	Quarter-final qualification	27 July 2013	White	New Zealand	Won	18	6	12
Match 5/7	Quarter-finals	29 July 2013	White	United States	Won	9	6	3
Match 6/7	Semi-finals	31 July 2013	White	Hungary	Won	13	12	1
Match 7/7	Gold medal match	2 August 2013	Blue	Australia	Won	8	6	2
Total	Matches played: 6 • Wins: 5 • Ties: 0 • Defeats: 1 • Win %: 83.3%					88	53	35

Source: Official Results Books (PDF): 2013 (Women's Competition Schedule, Women's Round Summary).

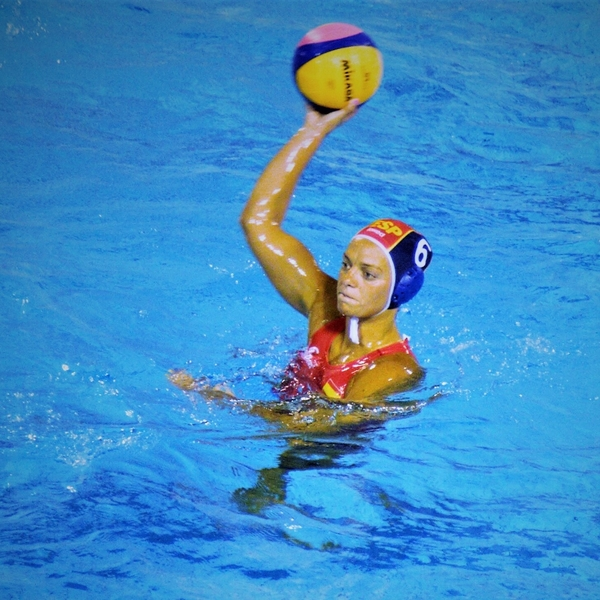
Jennifer Pareja, the captain of Spain, netted 16 goals at the 2013 World Aquatics Championships, becoming the team-leading scorer for the tournament.

- Head coach: (Spain) Miki Oca (1st title as head coach)
- Assistant coach: (Spain) Claudio Cardarona

Roster
Cap No.	Player	Pos	L/R	Height	Weight	Date of birth	Age of winning gold	ISHOF member
1	Laura Ester	GK	R	1.70 m (5 ft 7 in)	56 kg (123 lb)	22 January 1990	23 years, 192 days	
2	Marta Bach	CB	R	1.76 m (5 ft 9 in)	66 kg (146 lb)	17 February 1993	20 years, 166 days	
3	Anni Espar	D	R	1.80 m (5 ft 11 in)	66 kg (146 lb)	8 January 1993	20 years, 206 days	
4	Roser Tarragó	D	R	1.70 m (5 ft 7 in)	59 kg (130 lb)	25 March 1993	20 years, 130 days	
5	Matilde Ortiz	CB	R	1.74 m (5 ft 9 in)	64 kg (141 lb)	16 September 1990	22 years, 320 days	
6	Jennifer Pareja (C)	D	R	1.74 m (5 ft 9 in)	63 kg (139 lb)	8 May 1984	29 years, 86 days	
7	Lorena Miranda	CB	R	1.74 m (5 ft 9 in)	73 kg (161 lb)	7 April 1991	22 years, 117 days	
8	Pilar Peña	D	L	1.72 m (5 ft 8 in)	61 kg (134 lb)	4 April 1986	27 years, 120 days	
9	Andrea Blas	CF	R	1.73 m (5 ft 8 in)	81 kg (179 lb)	14 February 1992	21 years, 169 days	
10	Ona Meseguer	D	L	1.67 m (5 ft 6 in)	62 kg (137 lb)	20 February 1988	25 years, 163 days	
11	Maica García	CF	R	1.88 m (6 ft 2 in)	90 kg (198 lb)	17 October 1990	22 years, 289 days	
12	Laura López	D	R	1.70 m (5 ft 7 in)	63 kg (139 lb)	13 January 1988	25 years, 201 days	
13	Patricia Herrera	GK	R	1.63 m (5 ft 4 in)	59 kg (130 lb)	9 February 1993	20 years, 174 days	
Average				1.73 m (5 ft 8 in)	66 kg (146 lb)	29 April 1990	23 years, 95 days	
Coach	Miki Oca			1.87 m (6 ft 2 in)		15 April 1970	43 years, 109 days	

Sources:

- Official Results Books (PDF): 2013 (Team Roster – Spain);
- ISHOF: "Honorees by Country".

Abbreviation

- MP – Matches played
- Min – Minutes
- G – Goals
- Sh – Shots
- AS – Assists
- TF – Turnover fouls
- ST – Steals
- BL – Blocked shots
- SP – Sprints
- 20S – 20 seconds exclusion
- DE – Double exclusion
- Pen – Penalty
- EX – Exclusion

Statistics
Cap No.	Player	Pos	MP	Minutes played		Goals/Shots			AS	TF	ST	BL	Sprints			Personal fouls			
Cap No.	Player	Pos	MP	Min	%	G	Sh	%	AS	TF	ST	BL	Won	SP	%	20S	DE	Pen	EX
1	Laura Ester	GK	7	195	87.1%						2							1	
2	Marta Bach	CB	7	59	26.3%	1	5	20.0%		1	8					8			
3	Anni Espar	D	7	172	76.8%	9	23	39.1%	10	9	7	1				8	1	1	
4	Roser Tarragó	D	7	145	64.7%	11	29	37.9%	3	3	11	1	4	4	100%	5			
5	Matilde Ortiz	CB	7	102	45.5%	2	13	15.4%	2	5	3	1				11		2	3
6	Jennifer Pareja (C)	D	7	174	77.7%	16	36	44.4%	8	10	8	5	23	24	95.8%	7	1	1	1
7	Lorena Miranda	CB	7	75	33.5%	2	9	22.2%	2	2	4	2				11			1
8	Pilar Peña	D	7	162	72.3%	8	18	44.4%	5	8	10	1				1			
9	Andrea Blas	CF	7	96	42.9%	13	23	56.5%		12	4	3				3			
10	Ona Meseguer	D	7	63	28.1%	3	5	60.0%		1		1				2			
11	Maica García	CF	7	128	57.1%	9	18	50.0%		26	2	3				8	1		1
12	Laura López	D	7	168	75.0%	14	25	56.0%	4	5	7	4				9			
13	Patricia Herrera	GK	7	29	12.9%														
Team										3									
Total			7	224	100%	88	204	43.1%	34	85	66	22	27	28	96.4%	73	3	5	6
Against						53	163	32.5%	11	110	48	17	1	28	3.6%	76	3	12	13

Cap No.	Player	Pos	Saves/Shots		
Cap No.	Player	Pos	Saves	Shots	%
1	Laura Ester	GK	43	92	46.7%
13	Patricia Herrera	GK	7	11	63.6%
Total			50	103	48.5%

Source: Official Results Books (PDF): 2013 (Cumulative Statistics – Spain, p. 2).

=== 2011 (Greece, 1st title) ===
- Edition of women's tournament: 10th
- Host city: Shanghai, China
- Number of participating teams: 16
- Competition format: Round-robin pools advanced teams to classification matches
- Champion: Greece (1st title; place in preliminary C group)

Results
Match	Round	Date	Cap color	Opponent	Result	Goals for	Goals against	Goals diff.
Match 1/6	Preliminary round – Group C	17 July 2011	White	Spain	Won	10	9	1
Match 2/6	Preliminary round – Group C	19 July 2011	Blue	Brazil	Won	11	8	3
Match 3/6	Preliminary round – Group C	21 July 2011	White	Russia	Won	6	5	1
Match 4/6	Quarter-finals	25 July 2011	White	Netherlands	Won	12	10	2
Match 5/6	Semi-finals	27 July 2011	White	Italy	Won	14	11	3
Match 6/6	Gold medal match	29 July 2011	Blue	China	Won	9	8	1
Total	Matches played: 6 • Wins: 6 • Ties: 0 • Defeats: 0 • Win %: 100%					62	51	11

Source: Official Results Books (PDF): 2011 (Women's Competition Schedule, Women's Round Summary).

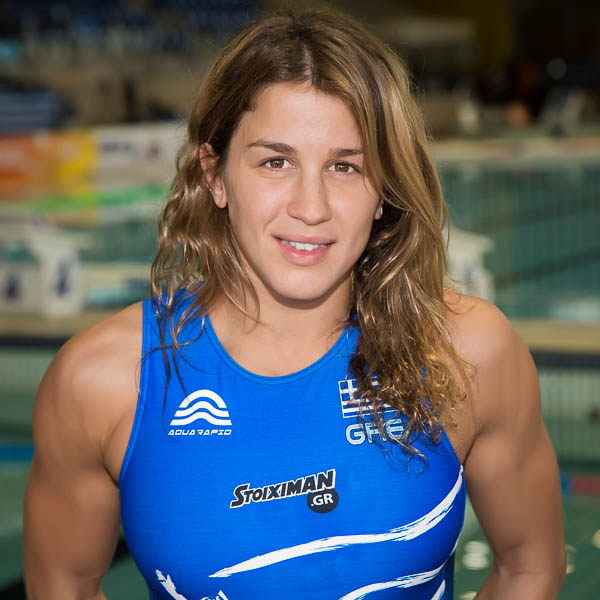
Alexandra Asimaki scored 11 goals at the 2011 World Aquatics Championships, helping Greece win gold.

- Head coach: (Greece) Giorgos Morfesis (1st title as head coach)

Roster
Cap No.	Player	Pos	L/R	Height	Weight	Date of birth	Age of winning gold	ISHOF member
1	Eleni Kouvdou	GK	R	1.75 m (5 ft 9 in)	67 kg (148 lb)	9 August 1989	21 years, 354 days	
2	Christina Tsoukala	CB	R	1.85 m (6 ft 1 in)	75 kg (165 lb)	8 July 1991	20 years, 21 days	
3	Antiopi Melidoni	CB	R	1.72 m (5 ft 8 in)	65 kg (143 lb)	11 October 1977	33 years, 291 days	
4	Ilektra Psouni	FP	R	1.70 m (5 ft 7 in)	60 kg (132 lb)	12 September 1985	25 years, 320 days	
5	Kyriaki Liosi (C)	D	R	1.70 m (5 ft 7 in)	63 kg (139 lb)	30 October 1979	31 years, 272 days	
6	Alkisti Avramidou	FP	R	1.70 m (5 ft 7 in)	62 kg (137 lb)	26 February 1988	23 years, 153 days	
7	Alexandra Asimaki	CF	R	1.70 m (5 ft 7 in)	64 kg (141 lb)	28 June 1988	23 years, 31 days	
8	Antigoni Roumpesi	D	L	1.77 m (5 ft 10 in)	85 kg (187 lb)	19 July 1983	28 years, 10 days	
9	Angeliki Gerolymou	D	R	1.68 m (5 ft 6 in)	71 kg (157 lb)	22 June 1982	29 years, 37 days	
10	Triantafyllia Manolioudaki	FP	R	1.70 m (5 ft 7 in)	62 kg (137 lb)	19 March 1986	25 years, 132 days	
11	Stavroula Antonakou	D	R	1.75 m (5 ft 9 in)	60 kg (132 lb)	2 May 1982	29 years, 88 days	
12	Georgia Lara	CF	R	1.75 m (5 ft 9 in)	65 kg (143 lb)	31 May 1980	31 years, 59 days	
13	Eleni Goula	GK	R	1.80 m (5 ft 11 in)	68 kg (150 lb)	18 August 1990	20 years, 345 days	
Average				1.74 m (5 ft 9 in)	67 kg (148 lb)	16 February 1985	26 years, 163 days	
Coach	Giorgos Morfesis					22 October 1969	41 years, 280 days	

Sources:

- Official Results Books (PDF): 2011 (Team Roster – Greece);
- ISHOF: "Honorees by Country".

Abbreviation

- MP – Matches played
- Min – Minutes
- G – Goals
- Sh – Shots
- AS – Assists
- TF – Turnover fouls
- ST – Steals
- BL – Blocked shots
- SP – Sprints
- 20S – 20 seconds exclusion
- Pen – Penalty
- EX – Exclusion

Statistics
Cap No.	Player	Pos	MP	Minutes played		Goals/Shots			AS	TF	ST	BL	Sprints			Personal fouls		
Cap No.	Player	Pos	MP	Min	%	G	Sh	%	AS	TF	ST	BL	Won	SP	%	20S	Pen	EX
1	Eleni Kouvdou	GK	6	192	100%	0	1	0.0%		1	5							
2	Christina Tsoukala	CB	6	93	48.4%	4	11	36.4%	3	3	2	1				11		2
3	Antiopi Melidoni	CB	6	71	37.0%	2	5	40.0%	1	2	3	1				9	1	
4	Ilektra Psouni	FP	6	67	34.9%	3	5	60.0%	2	4		3				14	1	4
5	Kyriaki Liosi (C)	D	6	156	81.3%	3	12	25.0%	5	5	4	2	8	20	40.0%	4	1	
6	Alkisti Avramidou	FP	6	57	29.7%	1	3	33.3%		3	1		0	1		1		
7	Alexandra Asimaki	CF	6	128	66.7%	11	30	36.7%	1	20	7					2		
8	Antigoni Roumpesi	D	6	169	88.0%	15	26	57.7%	1	9	7	1				3		
9	Angeliki Gerolymou	D	6	130	67.7%	9	17	52.9%	5	3	7					2		1
10	Triantafyllia Manolioudaki	FP	6	63	32.8%	5	9	55.6%	2	3	4	2	0	3	0.0%	7		1
11	Stavroula Antonakou	D	6	156	81.3%	9	29	31.0%	6	6	3	3				3		
12	Georgia Lara	CF	6	63	32.8%	0	6	0.0%		12	2	1				3		
13	Eleni Goula	GK	6	0	0.0%													
Team										2								
Total			6	192	100%	62	154	40.3%	26	73	45	14	8	24	33.3%	59	3	8
Against						51	156	32.7%	36	76	31	11	16	24	66.7%	43	5	2

Cap No.	Player	Pos	Saves/Shots		
Cap No.	Player	Pos	Saves	Shots	%
1	Eleni Kouvdou	GK	41	92	44.6%
13	Eleni Goula	GK			
Total			41	92	44.6%

Source: Official Results Books (PDF): 2011 (Cumulative Statistics – Greece, p. 3).

=== 2009 (United States, 3rd title) ===
- Edition of women's tournament: 9th
- Host city: Rome, Italy
- Number of participating teams: 16
- Competition format: Round-robin pools advanced teams to classification matches
- Champion: United States (3rd title; 2nd place in preliminary B group)

Results
Match	Round	Date	Cap color	Opponent	Result	Goals for	Goals against	Goals diff.
Match 1/7	Preliminary round – Group B	19 July 2009	White	Kazakhstan	Won	19	6	13
Match 2/7	Preliminary round – Group B	21 July 2009	Blue	Russia	Lost	10	11	-1
Match 3/7	Preliminary round – Group B	23 July 2009	White	Greece	Won	12	8	4
Match 4/7	Quarter-final qualification	25 July 2009	Blue	China	Won	12	9	3
Match 5/7	Quarter-finals	27 July 2009	Blue	Spain	Won	9	6	3
Match 6/7	Semi-finals	29 July 2009	Blue	Greece	Won	8	7	1
Match 7/7	Gold medal match	31 July 2009	Blue	Canada	Won	7	6	1
Total	Matches played: 7 • Wins: 6 • Ties: 0 • Defeats: 1 • Win %: 85.7%					77	53	24

Source: Official Results Books (PDF): 2009 (Women's Competition Schedule, Women's Round Summary).

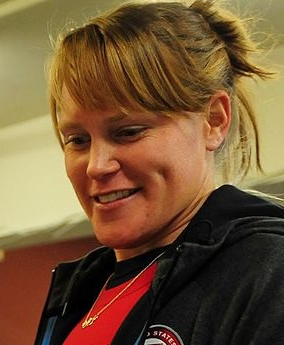
American Heather Petri won her third world title in 2009.

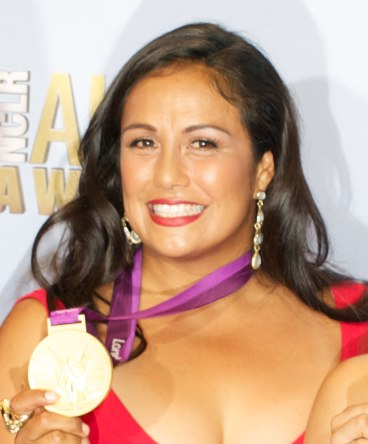
Brenda Villa, the captain of the United States, won her third world title in 2009.

- Head coach: (United States) Adam Krikorian (1st title as head coach)
- Assistant coach: (United States) Brandon Brooks

Roster
Cap No.	Player	Pos	L/R	Height	Weight	Date of birth	Age of winning gold	ISHOF member
1	Elizabeth Armstrong	GK	R	1.88 m (6 ft 2 in)		31 January 1983	26 years, 181 days	
2	Heather Petri	D	R	1.80 m (5 ft 11 in)		13 June 1978	31 years, 48 days	
3	Brittany Hayes	D	L	1.70 m (5 ft 7 in)		7 February 1985	24 years, 174 days	
4	Brenda Villa (C)	D	R	1.63 m (5 ft 4 in)		18 April 1980	29 years, 104 days	2018
5	Lauren Wenger	D	R	1.91 m (6 ft 3 in)		11 March 1984	25 years, 142 days	
6	Tanya Gandy	D	R	1.70 m (5 ft 7 in)		20 August 1987	21 years, 345 days	
7	Kelly Rulon	D	R	1.78 m (5 ft 10 in)		16 August 1984	24 years, 349 days	
8	Jessica Steffens	CB	R	1.83 m (6 ft 0 in)		7 April 1987	22 years, 115 days	
9	Elsie Windes	CB	R	1.78 m (5 ft 10 in)		17 June 1985	24 years, 44 days	
10	Alison Gregorka	CB	R	1.78 m (5 ft 10 in)		29 June 1985	24 years, 32 days	
11	Moriah van Norman	CF	R	1.78 m (5 ft 10 in)		30 May 1984	25 years, 62 days	
12	Kami Craig	CF	R	1.81 m (5 ft 11 in)		21 July 1987	22 years, 10 days	
13	Jaime Komer	GK	R	1.83 m (6 ft 0 in)		1 September 1981	27 years, 333 days	
Average				1.79 m (5 ft 10 in)		1 April 1984	25 years, 121 days	
Coach	Adam Krikorian					22 July 1974	35 years, 9 days	

Sources:

- Official Results Books (PDF): 2009 (Team Roster – United States);
- ISHOF: "Honorees by Country".

Abbreviation

- MP – Matches played
- Min – Minutes
- G – Goals
- Sh – Shots
- AS – Assists
- TF – Turnover fouls
- ST – Steals
- BL – Blocked shots
- SP – Sprints
- 20S – 20 seconds exclusion
- Pen – Penalty
- EX – Exclusion

Statistics
Cap No.	Player	Pos	MP	Minutes played		Goals/Shots			AS	TF	ST	BL	Sprints			Personal fouls		
Cap No.	Player	Pos	MP	Min	%	G	Sh	%	AS	TF	ST	BL	Won	SP	%	20S	Pen	EX
1	Elizabeth Armstrong	GK	7	216	96.4%						2							
2	Heather Petri	D	7	140	62.5%	7	20	35.0%	3	8	3	3	18	23	78.3%	9		
3	Brittany Hayes	D	7	90	40.2%	9	23	39.1%	7	6	3	1				3		
4	Brenda Villa (C)	D	7	175	78.1%	5	15	33.3%	6	13	4	5				8	1	1
5	Lauren Wenger	D	7	169	75.4%	8	28	28.6%	2	9	8	9	1	2	50.0%	7	2	1
6	Tanya Gandy	D	7	83	37.1%	3	9	33.3%		7	2	2	0	1	0.0%	2		
7	Kelly Rulon	D	7	159	71.0%	12	20	60.0%	3	4	2	1	0	1	0.0%	4	1	
8	Jessica Steffens	CB	7	109	48.7%	4	7	57.1%	2	5	4	2	0	1	0.0%	11	1	1
9	Elsie Windes	CB	7	110	49.1%	6	16	37.5%	2	4	3					4	4	1
10	Alison Gregorka	CB	7	115	51.3%	8	17	47.1%	1	1	4	3				13	2	2
11	Moriah van Norman	CF	7	74	33.0%	6	15	40.0%		20	2					3	1	
12	Kami Craig	CF	7	119	53.1%	9	16	56.3%		19	2	1				3		
13	Jaime Komer	GK	7	8	3.6%													
Team										2								
Total			7	224	100%	77	186	41.4%	26	98	39	27	19	28	67.9%	67	12	6
Against						53	200	26.5%	7	86	36	11	9	28	32.1%	61	9	9

Cap No.	Player	Pos	Saves/Shots		
Cap No.	Player	Pos	Saves	Shots	%
1	Elizabeth Armstrong	GK	67	119	56.3%
13	Jaime Komer	GK	2	3	66.7%
Total			69	122	56.6%

Source: Official Results Books (PDF): 2009 (Cumulative Statistics – United States, p. 2).

=== 2007 (United States, 2nd title) ===
- Edition of women's tournament: 8th
- Host city: Melbourne, Australia
- Number of participating teams: 16
- Competition format: Round-robin pools advanced teams to classification matches
- Champion: United States (2nd title; 1st place in preliminary C group)

Results
Match	Round	Date	Cap color	Opponent	Result	Goals for	Goals against	Goals diff.
Match 1/6	Preliminary round – Group C	19 March 2007	Blue	Netherlands	Won	9	7	2
Match 2/6	Preliminary round – Group C	21 March 2007	White	Kazakhstan	Won	13	5	8
Match 3/6	Preliminary round – Group C	23 March 2007	Blue	Greece	Won	8	6	2
Match 4/6	Quarter-finals	27 March 2007	White	Spain	Won	10	6	4
Match 5/6	Semi-finals	29 March 2007	White	Hungary	Won	10	9	1
Match 6/6	Gold medal match	31 March 2007	Blue	Australia	Won	6	5	1
Total	Matches played: 6 • Wins: 6 • Ties: 0 • Defeats: 0 • Win %: 100%					56	38	18

Source: Official Results Books (PDF): 2007 (Women's Round Summary).

- Head coach: (United States) Guy Baker (2nd title as head coach)
- Assistant coach: (United States) Heather Moody

Roster
Cap No.	Player	Pos	L/R	Height	Weight	Date of birth	Age of winning gold	ISHOF member
1	Elizabeth Armstrong	GK	R	1.88 m (6 ft 2 in)		31 January 1983	24 years, 59 days	
2	Heather Petri	D	R	1.80 m (5 ft 11 in)		13 June 1978	28 years, 291 days	
3	Ericka Lorenz	D	R	1.80 m (5 ft 11 in)		18 February 1981	26 years, 41 days	
4	Brenda Villa (C)	D	R	1.63 m (5 ft 4 in)		18 April 1980	26 years, 347 days	2018
5	Lauren Wenger	D	R	1.91 m (6 ft 3 in)		11 March 1984	23 years, 20 days	
6	Natalie Golda	CB	R	1.80 m (5 ft 11 in)		28 December 1981	25 years, 93 days	
7	Patty Cardenas	D	R	1.70 m (5 ft 7 in)		19 August 1984	22 years, 224 days	
8	Brittany Hayes	D	L	1.70 m (5 ft 7 in)		7 February 1985	22 years, 52 days	
9	Elsie Windes	CB	R	1.78 m (5 ft 10 in)		17 June 1985	21 years, 287 days	
10	Alison Gregorka	CB	R	1.78 m (5 ft 10 in)		29 June 1985	21 years, 275 days	
11	Moriah van Norman	CF	R	1.78 m (5 ft 10 in)		30 May 1984	22 years, 305 days	
12	Kami Craig	CF	R	1.81 m (5 ft 11 in)		21 July 1987	19 years, 253 days	
13	Jaime Hipp	GK	R	1.83 m (6 ft 0 in)		1 September 1981	25 years, 211 days	
Average				1.78 m (5 ft 10 in)		6 May 1983	23 years, 329 days	
Coach	Guy Baker							

Sources:

- Official Results Books (PDF): 2007 (Start Lists – United States: match 05, match 11, match 20, match 37, match 44, match 48);
- ISHOF: "Honorees by Country".

Abbreviation

- MP – Matches played
- Min – Minutes
- G – Goals
- Sh – Shots
- AS – Assists
- TF – Turnover fouls
- ST – Steals
- BL – Blocked shots
- SP – Sprints
- 20S – 20 seconds exclusion
- Pen – Penalty
- EX – Exclusion

Statistics
Cap No.	Player	Pos	MP	Minutes played		Goals/Shots			AS	TF	ST	BL	Sprints			Personal fouls		
Cap No.	Player	Pos	MP	Min	%	G	Sh	%	AS	TF	ST	BL	Won	SP	%	20S	Pen	EX
1	Elizabeth Armstrong	GK	6	198	100%				1		1							
2	Heather Petri	D	6	142	71.7%	5	18	27.8%	9	5	7	5	12	24	50.0%	6		
3	Ericka Lorenz	D	6	113	57.1%	6	17	35.3%	4	2	4	1	0	1	0.0%	2		
4	Brenda Villa (C)	D	6	179	90.4%	11	28	39.3%	7	6	7	4				6		
5	Lauren Wenger	D	6	164	82.8%	13	34	38.2%	4	6	5	1				1	1	
6	Natalie Golda	CB	6	110	55.6%	5	20	25.0%	6	7	2					6	1	
7	Patty Cardenas	D	6	80	40.4%	4	14	28.6%	1	1	3	1				4		
8	Brittany Hayes	D	6	35	17.7%	1	6	16.7%	1	1	4					1		
9	Elsie Windes	CB	6	98	49.5%	1	8	12.5%	4	2	3	1	0	1	0.0%	10		
10	Alison Gregorka	CB	6	90	45.5%	3	13	23.1%	6	5	3	1				9		2
11	Moriah van Norman	CF	6	90	45.5%	4	14	28.6%	2	17	2	1				3		
12	Kami Craig	CF	6	87	43.9%	3	7	42.9%		17	2	1				2		
13	Jaime Hipp	GK	6	0	0.0%													
Team										6								
Total			6	198	100%	56	179	31.3%	45	75	43	16	12	26	46.2%	50	2	2
Against						38	161	23.6%	29	98	39	17	14	26	53.8%	38	1	1

Cap No.	Player	Pos	Saves/Shots		
Cap No.	Player	Pos	Saves	Shots	%
1	Elizabeth Armstrong	GK	59	97	60.8%
13	Jaime Hipp	GK			
Total			59	97	60.8%

Source: Official Results Books (PDF): 2007 (Results – United States: match 05, match 11, match 20, match 37, match 44, match 48).

=== 2005 (Hungary, 2nd title) ===
- Edition of women's tournament: 7th
- Host city: Montreal, Canada
- Number of participating teams: 16
- Competition format: Round-robin pools advanced teams to classification matches
- Champion: Hungary (2nd title; 1st place in preliminary B group)

Results
Match	Round	Date	Opponent	Result	Goals for	Goals against	Goals diff.
Match 1/6	Preliminary round – Group B	17 July 2005	China	Won	18	4	14
Match 2/6	Preliminary round – Group B	19 July 2005	United States	Won	9	8	1
Match 3/6	Preliminary round – Group B	21 July 2005	Spain	Won	8	5	3
Match 4/6	Quarter-finals	25 July 2005	Germany	Won	10	4	6
Match 5/6	Semi-finals	27 July 2005	Canada	Won	9	7	2
Match 6/6	Gold medal match	29 July 2005	United States	Won	10	7	3
Total	Matches played: 6 • Wins: 6 • Ties: 0 • Defeats: 0 • Win %: 100%				64	35	29

Sources:

- Official Reports (FINA) (PDF): "World Championship" (p. 57);
- Todor66: "2005 World Championship (women's tournament)".
- Head coach: (Hungary) Tamás Faragó (1st title as head coach)
- Assistant coach: (Hungary) Mátyás Petrovics

Roster
Cap No.	Player	Pos	L/R	Height	Weight	Date of birth	Age of winning gold	ISHOF member
1	Patrícia Horváth	GK	R	1.83 m (6 ft 0 in)	73 kg (161 lb)	7 December 1977	27 years, 234 days	
2	Eszter Tomaskovics	FP	R			23 August 1987	17 years, 340 days	
3	Khrisctina Serfozo	FP						
4	Dóra Kisteleki	D	R	1.73 m (5 ft 8 in)	60 kg (132 lb)	11 May 1983	22 years, 79 days	
5	Mercédesz Stieber (C)	D	R	1.74 m (5 ft 9 in)	65 kg (143 lb)	4 September 1974	30 years, 328 days	
6	Andrea Tóth	GK	R	1.83 m (6 ft 0 in)	70 kg (154 lb)	7 August 1981	23 years, 356 days	
7	Rita Drávucz	D	R	1.80 m (5 ft 11 in)	69 kg (152 lb)	14 April 1980	25 years, 106 days	
8	Krisztina Zantleitner	CB	R	1.84 m (6 ft 0 in)	72 kg (159 lb)	8 May 1974	31 years, 82 days	
9	Orsolya Takács	D	R	1.90 m (6 ft 3 in)	85 kg (187 lb)	20 May 1985	20 years, 70 days	
10	Anikó Pelle	CF	R	1.85 m (6 ft 1 in)	72 kg (159 lb)	28 September 1978	26 years, 304 days	
11	Ágnes Valkai	D	R	1.68 m (5 ft 6 in)	64 kg (141 lb)	27 February 1981	24 years, 152 days	
12	Fruzsina Brávik	D	R	1.81 m (5 ft 11 in)	83 kg (183 lb)	6 October 1986	18 years, 296 days	
13	Timea Benko	FP						
Average				1.80 m (5 ft 11 in) (Note: Average height of 10 players.)	71 kg (157 lb) (Note: Average weight of 10 players.)	30 January 1981	24 years, 180 days (Note: Average age of 11 players.)	
Coach	Tamás Faragó			1.94 m (6 ft 4 in)		5 August 1952	52 years, 358 days	1993

Sources:

- Official Reports (FINA) (PDF): "World Champions–Team Line-up" (p. 57);
- Olympedia: "Olympians Who Won a Medal at the World Aquatics Championships";
- ISHOF: "Honorees by Country".

=== 2003 (United States, 1st title) ===
- Edition of women's tournament: 6th
- Host city: Barcelona, Spain
- Number of participating teams: 16
- Competition format: Round-robin pools advanced teams to classification matches
- Champion: United States (1st title; 1st place in preliminary C group)

Results
Match	Round	Date	Opponent	Result	Goals for	Goals against	Goals diff.
Match 1/6	Preliminary round – Group C	13 July 2003	Greece	Won	10	7	3
Match 2/6	Preliminary round – Group C	15 July 2003	France	Won	15	3	12
Match 3/6	Preliminary round – Group C	17 July 2003	Germany	Won	10	4	6
Match 4/6	Quarter-finals	21 July 2003	Australia	Won	8	4	4
Match 5/6	Semi-finals	23 July 2003	Russia	Won	11	7	4
Match 6/6	Gold medal match	25 July 2003	Italy	Won	8	6	2
Total	Matches played: 6 • Wins: 6 • Ties: 0 • Defeats: 0 • Win %: 100%				62	31	31

Sources:

- Official Reports (FINA) (PDF): "World Championship" (p. 57);
- Todor66: "2003 World Championship (women's tournament)".
- Head coach: (United States) Guy Baker (1st title as head coach)

Roster
Cap No.	Player	Pos	L/R	Height	Weight	Date of birth	Age of winning gold	ISHOF member
1	Jacqueline Frank	GK	R	1.80 m (5 ft 11 in)		1 May 1980	23 years, 85 days	
2	Heather Petri	D	R	1.80 m (5 ft 11 in)		13 June 1978	25 years, 42 days	
3	Ericka Lorenz	D	R	1.80 m (5 ft 11 in)		18 February 1981	22 years, 157 days	
4	Brenda Villa	D	R	1.63 m (5 ft 4 in)		18 April 1980	23 years, 98 days	2018
5	Ellen Estes	CF	R	1.82 m (6 ft 0 in)		13 October 1978	24 years, 285 days	
6	Natalie Golda	CB	R	1.80 m (5 ft 11 in)		28 December 1981	21 years, 209 days	
7	Margaret Dingeldein	D	R	1.67 m (5 ft 6 in)		30 May 1980	23 years, 56 days	
8	Gabrielle Domanic	FP				24 February 1985	18 years, 151 days	
9	Heather Moody (C)	CF	R	1.82 m (6 ft 0 in)		21 August 1973	29 years, 338 days	
10	Robin Beauregard	CB	R	1.75 m (5 ft 9 in)		23 February 1979	24 years, 152 days	
11	Amber Stachowski	CB	R	1.82 m (6 ft 0 in)		14 March 1983	20 years, 133 days	
12	Nicolle Payne	GK	R	1.75 m (5 ft 9 in)		15 July 1976	27 years, 10 days	
13	Thalia Munro	CB	R	1.77 m (5 ft 10 in)		8 March 1982	21 years, 139 days	
Average				1.77 m (5 ft 10 in) (Note: Average height of 12 players.)		5 February 1980	23 years, 170 days	
Coach	Guy Baker							

Sources:

- Official Reports (FINA) (PDF): "World Champions–Team Line-up" (p. 57);
- Olympedia: "Olympians Who Won a Medal at the World Aquatics Championships";
- ISHOF: "Honorees by Country".

=== 2001 (Italy, 2nd title) ===
- Edition of women's tournament: 5th
- Host city: Fukuoka, Japan
- Number of participating teams: 12
- Competition format: Round-robin pools advanced teams to classification matches
- Champion: Italy (2nd title; 3rd place in preliminary A group)

Results
Match	Round	Date	Opponent	Result	Goals for	Goals against	Goals diff.
Match 1/8	Preliminary round – Group A	18 July 2001	United States	Drawn	8	8	0
Match 2/8	Preliminary round – Group A	19 July 2001	New Zealand	Won	18	1	17
Match 3/8	Preliminary round – Group A	21 July 2001	Russia	Lost	6	13	-7
Match 4/8	Preliminary round – Group A	22 July 2001	Kazakhstan	Won	8	6	2
Match 5/8	Preliminary round – Group A	23 July 2001	Brazil	Won	18	7	11
Match 6/8	Quarter-finals	25 July 2001	Australia	Won	4	1	3
Match 7/8	Semi-finals	26 July 2001	United States	Won	8	6	2
Match 8/8	Gold medal match	27 July 2001	Hungary	Won	7	3	4
Total	Matches played: 8 • Wins: 6 • Ties: 1 • Defeats: 1 • Win %: 75.0%				77	45	32

Sources:

- Official Reports (FINA) (PDF): "World Championship" (p. 57);
- Todor66: "2001 World Championship (women's tournament)".
- Head coach: (Italy) Pierluigi Formiconi (2nd title as head coach)

Roster
#	Player	Pos	L/R	Height	Weight	Date of birth	Age of winning gold	ISHOF member
P1	Carmela Allucci (C)	D	R	1.67 m (5 ft 6 in)	60 kg (132 lb)	22 January 1970	31 years, 186 days	
P2	Alexandra Araújo	CF	R	1.67 m (5 ft 6 in)	67 kg (148 lb)	13 July 1972	29 years, 14 days	
P3	Silvia Bosurgi	D	R	1.65 m (5 ft 5 in)	61 kg (134 lb)	17 April 1979	22 years, 101 days	
P4	Cristina Consoli							
P5	Francesca Conti	GK	R	1.79 m (5 ft 10 in)	71 kg (157 lb)	21 May 1972	29 years, 67 days	
P6	Tania Di Mario	D	R	1.67 m (5 ft 6 in)	59 kg (130 lb)	4 May 1979	22 years, 84 days	
P7	Melania Grego	D	R	1.71 m (5 ft 7 in)	72 kg (159 lb)	19 June 1973	28 years, 38 days	
P8	Giusi Malato	CF	R	1.70 m (5 ft 7 in)	77 kg (170 lb)	9 July 1971	30 years, 18 days	
P9	Martina Miceli	D	R	1.68 m (5 ft 6 in)	65 kg (143 lb)	22 October 1973	27 years, 278 days	
P10	Maddalena Musumeci	CF	R	1.70 m (5 ft 7 in)	63 kg (139 lb)	26 March 1976	25 years, 123 days	
P11	Paola Sabbatini							
P12	Gabriella Sciolti							
P13	Monica Vaillant							
Average				1.69 m (5 ft 7 in) (Note: Average height of 9 players.)	66 kg (146 lb) (Note: Average weight of 9 players.)	17 April 1974	27 years, 101 days (Note: Average age of 9 players.)	
Coach	Pierluigi Formiconi							

Sources:

- Official Reports (FINA) (PDF): "World Champions–Team Line-up" (p. 57);
- Olympedia: "Olympians Who Won a Medal at the World Aquatics Championships";
- ISHOF: "Honorees by Country".

=== 1998 (Italy, 1st title) ===
- Edition of women's tournament: 4th
- Host city: Perth, Australia
- Number of participating teams: 12
- Competition format: Round-robin pools advanced teams to classification matches
- Champion: Italy (1st title; 4th place in preliminary B group)

Results
Match	Round	Date	Opponent	Result	Goals for	Goals against	Goals diff.
Match 1/8	Preliminary round – Group B	8 January 1998	Hungary	Lost	10	11	-1
Match 2/8	Preliminary round – Group B	9 January 1998	Greece	Lost	4	10	-6
Match 3/8	Preliminary round – Group B	10 January 1998	Netherlands	Lost	5	6	-1
Match 4/8	Preliminary round – Group B	11 January 1998	Spain	Won	10	3	7
Match 5/8	Preliminary round – Group B	12 January 1998	Kazakhstan	Won	19	3	16
Match 6/8	Quarter-finals	14 January 1998	Canada	Won	12	9	3
Match 7/8	Semi-finals	15 January 1998	Australia	Won	10	9	1
Match 8/8	Gold medal match	16 January 1998	Netherlands	Won	7	6	1
Total	Matches played: 8 • Wins: 5 • Ties: 0 • Defeats: 3 • Win %: 62.5%				77	57	20

Sources:

- Official Reports (FINA) (PDF): "World Championship" (p. 57);
- Todor66: "1998 World Championship (women's tournament)".
- Head coach: (Italy) Pierluigi Formiconi (1st title as head coach)

Roster
#	Player	Pos	L/R	Height	Weight	Date of birth	Age of winning gold	ISHOF member
P1	Carmela Allucci	D	R	1.67 m (5 ft 6 in)	60 kg (132 lb)	22 January 1970	27 years, 359 days	
P2	Alexandra Araújo	CF	R	1.67 m (5 ft 6 in)	67 kg (148 lb)	13 July 1972	25 years, 187 days	
P3	Cristina Consoli							
P4	Francesca Conti	GK	R	1.79 m (5 ft 10 in)	71 kg (157 lb)	21 May 1972	25 years, 240 days	
P5	Antonella Di Giacinto							
P6	Eleonora Gay							
P7	Melania Grego	D	R	1.71 m (5 ft 7 in)	72 kg (159 lb)	19 June 1973	24 years, 211 days	
P8	Stefania Larucci							
P9	Giusi Malato	CF	R	1.70 m (5 ft 7 in)	77 kg (170 lb)	9 July 1971	26 years, 191 days	
P10	Martina Miceli	D	R	1.68 m (5 ft 6 in)	65 kg (143 lb)	22 October 1973	24 years, 86 days	
P11	Maddalena Musumeci	CF	R	1.70 m (5 ft 7 in)	63 kg (139 lb)	26 March 1976	21 years, 296 days	
P12	Monica Vaillant							
P13	Milena Virzi							
Average				1.70 m (5 ft 7 in) (Note: Average height of 7 players.)	68 kg (150 lb) (Note: Average weight of 7 players.)	9 November 1972	25 years, 68 days (Note: Average age of 7 players.)	
Coach	Pierluigi Formiconi							

Sources:

- Official Reports (FINA) (PDF): "World Champions–Team Line-up" (p. 57);
- Olympedia: "Olympians Who Won a Medal at the World Aquatics Championships";
- ISHOF: "Honorees by Country".

=== 1994 (Hungary, 1st title) ===
- Edition of women's tournament: 3rd
- Host city: Rome, Italy
- Number of participating teams: 12
- Competition format: Round-robin pools advanced teams to classification matches
- Champion: Hungary (1st title; 2nd place in preliminary A group)

Results
Match	Round	Date	Opponent	Result	Goals for	Goals against	Goals diff.
Match 1/7	Preliminary round – Group A	1 September 1994	Canada	Won	13	7	6
Match 2/7	Preliminary round – Group A	2 September 1994	Russia	Won	6	4	2
Match 3/7	Preliminary round – Group A	3 September 1994	France	Won	7	4	3
Match 4/7	Preliminary round – Group A	5 September 1994	Brazil	Won	7	3	4
Match 5/7	Preliminary round – Group A	6 September 1994	Netherlands	Lost	8	10	-2
Match 6/7	Semi-finals	8 September 1994	Italy	Won	7	5	2
Match 7/7	Gold medal match	9 September 1994	Netherlands	Won	7	5	2
Total	Matches played: 7 • Wins: 6 • Ties: 0 • Defeats: 1 • Win %: 85.7%				55	38	17

Sources:

- Official Reports (FINA) (PDF): "World Championship" (p. 57);
- Todor66: "1994 World Championship (women's tournament)".

Head coach: (Hungary) Gyula Tóth (1st title as head coach)

Roster
#	Player	Pos	L/R	Height	Weight	Date of birth	Age of winning gold	ISHOF member
P1	Katalin Dancsa							
P2	Zsuzsa Dunkel							
P3	Andrea Eke							
P4	Zsuzsanna Hulf							
P5	Ildikó Kuna							
P6	Irén Rafael							
P7	Katalin Redei							
P8	Edit Sipos							
P9	Mercédesz Stieber	FP	R	1.74 m (5 ft 9 in)	65 kg (143 lb)	4 September 1974	20 years, 5 days	
P10	Orsolya Szalkay							
P11	Krisztina Szremkó	FP	R	1.80 m (5 ft 11 in)	84 kg (185 lb)	6 January 1972	22 years, 246 days	
P12	Gabriella Tóth							
P13	Noémi Tóth	FP	R	1.80 m (5 ft 11 in)	67 kg (148 lb)	7 June 1976	18 years, 94 days	
Average								
Coach	Gyula Tóth							

Sources:

- Official Reports (FINA) (PDF): "World Champions–Team Line-up" (p. 57);
- Olympedia: "Olympians Who Won a Medal at the World Aquatics Championships";
- ISHOF: "Honorees by Country".

=== 1991 (Netherlands, 1st title) ===
- Edition of women's tournament: 2nd
- Host city: Perth, Australia
- Number of participating teams: 9
- Competition format: Round-robin pools advanced teams to classification matches
- Champion: Netherlands (1st title; 1st place in preliminary A group)

Results
Match	Round	Date	Opponent	Result	Goals for	Goals against	Goals diff.
Match 1/6	Preliminary round – Group A	5 January 1991	Canada	Won	9	8	1
Match 2/6	Preliminary round – Group A	6 January 1991	France	Won	16	9	7
Match 3/6	Preliminary round – Group A	7 January 1991	New Zealand	Won	11	10	1
Match 4/6	Preliminary round – Group A	9 January 1991	Germany	Won	13	8	5
Match 5/6	Semi-finals	11 January 1991	United States	Won	9	6	3
Match 6/6	Gold medal match	12 January 1991	Canada	Won	13	6	7
Total	Matches played: 6 • Wins: 6 • Ties: 0 • Defeats: 0 • Win %: 100%				71	47	24

Sources:

- Official Reports (FINA) (PDF): "World Championship" (p. 57);
- Todor66: "1991 World Championship (women's tournament)".
- Head coach: (Netherlands) Peter van den Biggelaar (1st title as head coach)

Roster
#	Player	Pos	L/R	Height	Weight	Date of birth	Age of winning gold	ISHOF member
P1	Hellen Boering	GK		1.89 m (6 ft 2 in)	80 kg (176 lb)	27 July 1964	26 years, 169 days	
P2	Karla van der Boon	GK		1.81 m (5 ft 11 in)	72 kg (159 lb)	9 October 1968	22 years, 95 days	
P3	Irma Brander							
P4	Edmée Hiemstra	FP		1.72 m (5 ft 8 in)	69 kg (152 lb)	22 July 1970	20 years, 174 days	
P5	Monique Kranenburg							
P6	Karin Kuipers	FP		1.76 m (5 ft 9 in)	78 kg (172 lb)	18 July 1972	18 years, 178 days	2014
P7	Patricia Libregts	FP		1.78 m (5 ft 10 in)	82 kg (181 lb)	22 February 1966	24 years, 324 days	
P8	Alice Lindhout							
P9	Lilian Ossendrijver							
P10	Janny Spijker							
P11	Marjan op den Velde	FP		1.81 m (5 ft 11 in)	72 kg (159 lb)	9 January 1971	20 years, 3 days	
P12	Hedda Verdam							
P13	Esmeralda van den Water							
Average								
Coach	Peter van den Biggelaar							

Sources:

- Official Reports (FINA) (PDF): "World Champions–Team Line-up" (p. 57);
- Olympedia: "Olympians Who Won a Medal at the World Aquatics Championships";
- ISHOF: "Honorees by Country".

=== 1986 (Australia, 1st title) ===
- Edition of women's tournament: 1st
- Host city: Madrid, Spain
- Number of participating teams: 9
- Competition format: Round-robin pools advanced teams to the round-robin final pool
- Champion: Australia (1st title; 1st place in preliminary B group)

Results
Match	Round	Date	Opponent	Result	Goals for	Goals against	Goals diff.
Match 1/7	Preliminary round – Group B	14 August 1986	Great Britain	Won	12	4	8
Match 2/7	Preliminary round – Group B	15 August 1986	Belgium	Won	17	2	15
Match 3/7	Preliminary round – Group B	16 August 1986	Netherlands	Won	8	7	1
Match 4/7	Preliminary round – Group B	17 August 1986	West Germany	Won	16	6	10
Match 5/7	Final round – Group	20 August 1986	Canada	Won	9	6	3
Match 6/7	Final round – Group	21 August 1986	Hungary	Won	13	4	9
Match 7/7	Final round – Group	22 August 1986	United States	Won	8	7	1
Total	Matches played: 7 • Wins: 7 • Ties: 0 • Defeats: 0 • Win %: 100%				83	36	47

Sources:

- Official Reports (FINA) (PDF): "World Championship" (p. 57);
- Todor66: "1986 World Championship (women's tournament)".

Head coach: (Australia)

Roster
#	Player	Pos	L/R	Height	Weight	Date of birth	Age of winning gold	ISHOF member
P1	Judy Gair							
P2	Cummins Handley							
P3	Amanda Leeson							
P4	Katie McAdams							
P5	Megan Meloncelli							
P6	Sandy Mills-O'mellia							
P7	Lynne Morrison							
P8	Jackie Northam							
P9	Cathy Parkers							
P10	Janet Rayner							
P11	Julie Sheperd							
P12	Debbie Watson	FP	R	1.78 m (5 ft 10 in)	71 kg (157 lb)	28 September 1965	20 years, 328 days	2008
Average								

Sources:

- Official Reports (FINA) (PDF): "World Champions–Team Line-up" (p. 57);
- Olympedia: "Olympians Who Won a Medal at the World Aquatics Championships";
- ISHOF: "Honorees by Country".

== See also ==
- Water polo at the World Aquatics Championships
- List of world champions in men's water polo
- List of World Aquatics Championships women's water polo tournament records and statistics
- List of World Aquatics Championships men's water polo tournament records and statistics
- List of World Aquatics Championships medalists in water polo
- List of Olympic champions in women's water polo
- List of Olympic champions in men's water polo

== Sources ==
=== Official Reports (FINA) ===
PDF documents on the FINA website:

- HistoFINA – Water polo medalists and statistics (as of September 2019) (archive) (pp. 57–62)

=== Official Results Books (FINA) ===
PDF documents on the Omega Timing website:

- 12th World Championship (2007)
  - General information, Women's Round Summary.

PDF documents on the Sport Result website:

- 13th World Championship (2009)
  - Results, Participants, Statistics.
  - Women's Competition Schedule, Women's Round Summary.
- 14th World Championship (2011)
  - Results, Participants, Statistics.
  - Women's Competition Schedule, Women's Round Summary.
- 15th World Championship (2013)
  - Results, Participants, Statistics.
  - Women's Competition Schedule, Women's Round Summary.
- 16th World Championship (2015)
  - Results, Participants, Statistics.
  - Women's Competition Schedule, Women's Round Summary.
- 17th World Championship (2017)
  - Results, Participants, Statistics.
  - Women's Competition Schedule, Women's Round Summary.
- 18th World Championship (2019)
  - Results, Participants, Statistics.
  - Women's Competition Schedule, Women's Round Summary.
- 19th World Championship (2022)
  - Results, Participants, Statistics.
  - Women's Competition Schedule, Women's Round Summary.
- 20th World Championship (2023)
  - Results, Participants, Statistics.
  - Women's Competition Schedule, Women's Round Summary.
- 21st World Championship (2024)
  - Results, Participants, Statistics.
  - Women's Competition Schedule, Women's Round Summary.

=== Olympedia ===
Water polo on the Olympedia website:

- Olympians Who Won a Medal at the World Aquatics Championships

=== Todor66 ===
Water polo on the Todor66 website:

- Water Polo World Championship
- Women's Water Polo World Championship
- 1986 World Championship (women's tournament)
- 1991 World Championship (women's tournament)
- 1994 World Championship (women's tournament)
- 1998 World Championship (women's tournament)
- 2001 World Championship (women's tournament)
- 2003 World Championship (women's tournament)
- 2005 World Championship (women's tournament)
- 2007 World Championship (women's tournament)
- 2009 World Championship (women's tournament)
- 2011 World Championship (women's tournament)
- 2013 World Championship (women's tournament)
- 2015 World Championship (women's tournament)
- 2017 World Championship (women's tournament)
- 2019 World Championship (women's tournament)
- 2022 World Championship (women's tournament)
- 2023 World Championship (women's tournament)
- 2024 World Championship (women's tournament)
- 2025 World Championship (women's tournament)

=== ISHOF ===
International Swimming Hall of Fame (ISHOF) website:

- Honorees Listed by Category – Water Polo
- Honorees Listed by Category – Coaches
- Honorees Listed by Category – Contributors
- Honorees by Country
- Honorees By Last Name
