= Ashley Grossman =

American water polo player (born 1993)

Personal information
- National team: United States
- Born: May 27, 1993 (age 33) Santa Monica, California, U.S.
- Height: 5 ft 11 in (180 cm)
- Weight: 195 lb (88 kg)

Sport
- Sport: Swimming
- Strokes: water polo
- College team: Stanford Cardinal
Medal record
Representing United States
World Championships
Gold medal – first place	2015 Kazan	Team competition
Pan American Games
Gold medal – first place	2015 Toronto	Team competition

Ashley Grossman (born May 27, 1993) is a water polo player. She has competed as a member of the United States women's national water polo team, for both the U.S. Junior and Senior National Teams, including as Team USA won a gold medal in water polo at the 2015 Pan American Games.

== Early life ==
Grossman was born in Santa Monica, California, to Linda and Gerald (Gerry) Grossman. Her father played football for the Tufts Jumbos at Tufts University, and her mother ran track for the Milwaukee Panthers at the University of Wisconsin–Milwaukee.

== Water polo career ==
Grossman attended Harvard-Westlake High School (Class of 2011), earning four letters in water polo and captain of the water polo team her final two years. Her senior year she was named All-American, CIF Southern Section Division I Player of the Year, and Mission League MVP. She competed in the 2009 and 2011 Junior World Water Polo Championships, and was named MVP of the 2010 Junior Olympics. In 2011, she and high school baseball player Max Fried won the Southern California Jewish Sports Hall of Fame High School Award.

She then attended Stanford University (Class of 2014, majoring in Science, Technology and Society), and with the water polo team winning three NCAA championships. As a freshman in 2012, playing for the Stanford Cardinal water polo team at the 2-meter position, Grossman was Association of College Water Polo Coaches (ACWPC) All-America Honorable Mention, ACWPC All-Academic - Excellent, All-Mountain Pacific Sports Federation (MPSF) Honorable Mention, and named to the MPSF All-Newcomer Team. As a sophomore in 2013, she was ACWPC All-Academic - Superior, and MPSF All-Academic. As a junior in 2014, she was ACWPC All-America Honorable Mention, ACWPC All-Academic - Superior, All-MPSF Honorable Mention, and MPSF All-Academic. As a senior in 2015, she was ACWPC First Team All-American, ACWPC All-Academic - Superior, All-NCAA Tournament First Team, All-MPSF Second Team, and MPSF All-Academic. She finished her college career 10th in Stanford history, with 169 goals. She was the co-recipient of the Pam Strathairn Award at the Stanford Athletic Board Awards, for her competitive attitude. In 2016, she was awarded an NCAA postgraduate scholarship for her academic and athletic achievements.

In 2012, 2014, and 2015, Grossman won the NCAA Championship with Stanford University. In 2013 she won a gold medal at the FINA Junior Water Polo World Championships. In 2014, with Team USA she won a silver medal at the FINA Women's Water Polo Intercontinental Tournament.

Grossman competed as a member of the United States women's national water polo team, for both the U.S. Junior and Senior National Teams. She played for Team USA in the 2015 FINA Women's Water Polo World League as it won a gold medal in June 2015, and the 2015 Pan American Games against Argentina, Cuba, and Mexico as Team USA won a gold medal in water polo at the 2015 Pan American Games in July 2015.

== Halls of Fame ==
In 2016 Grossman was inducted into the Southern California Jewish Sports Hall of Fame and the Jewish Sports Hall of Fame Northern California. In 2017, she was inducted into the Harvard-Westlake Hall of Fame.

== See also ==
- List of world champions in women's water polo
- List of World Aquatics Championships medalists in water polo
