= Eleni Goula =

Greek water polo player

Personal information
- Nationality: Greek
- Born: 18 August 1990 (age 36)
- Height: 1.80 m (5 ft 11 in)
- Weight: 68 kg (150 lb)

Sport
- Sport: Water polo
- Handedness: right
- Position: goalkeeper
National team
- Years: Team
- ?: Greece
Medal record
Representing Greece
World Championships
Gold medal – first place	2011 Shanghai	Team competition

Eleni Goula (born 18 August 1990) is a Greek female former water polo player. She was part of the Greece women's national water polo team that won the gold medal at the 2011 World Aquatics Championships.

== See also ==
- List of world champions in women's water polo
- List of World Aquatics Championships medalists in water polo
