= Gabrielle Domanic =

American water polo player (born 1985)

Personal information
- Full name: Gabrielle Elise Domanic -Fernandez
- Nicknames: Gaby, Gabbie
- Born: February 24, 1985 (age 41) Orange, California, U.S.
- Occupation: Nurse Practitioner
- Height: 5 ft 6 in (168 cm)

Sport
- Sport: Water Polo; Swimming
- Position: Left-handed Field Player (W. Polo); Attacker (Strong on offense)
- College team: U. California Los Angeles
- Club: SoCal Club Team
- Coached by: D. Mikesell, D. Kaltt (Foothill High); Guy Baker (U.S. National Team); Adam Krikorian (UCLA)
Medal record
Women's water polo
Representing United States
World Championships
Gold medal – first place	2003 Barcelona	Team competition

Gabrielle "Gaby" Elise Domanic (born February 24, 1985), also known by her married name Gabrielle Domanic-Fernandez is a former American water polo player who was an All-American for the University of California Los Angeles, and won the gold medal with the USA Women's Team at the 2003 FINA Women's World Water Polo Championship in Barcelona, Spain. In the same year, she won another team gold medal in water polo at the Pan American championships in August, 2003. Having played with the U.S. national team since the age of 14, she was chosen as an alternate for the 2004 Athens Olympics. She later worked as a Nurse Practitioner in greater Orange County.

== Early life ==
Domanic was born February 24, 1985, one of four siblings to Eric and Jackie Domanic in Orange, California, about 30 miles South of Los Angeles. She grew up in Santa Ana, California, just four miles South of Orange, California. Gabrielle trained and competed for the strong program at Orange County's SoCal Club team and Foothill High School under water polo coaches Dave Mikesell and Dan Kaltt, and swimming Coach Jim Brumm. At only 14, she was one of the youngest water polo field position competitors to make the U.S. National Water Polo team. She was a team co-Captain her Senior year at Foothill High, and a Most Valuable Player at the Holiday Cup tournament as a member of the Senior National Team. Part of an outstanding High School team, she helped Foothill High place first in four successive California Interscholastic Federation Division I championships, and after graduating in 2003, was the top collegiate water polo recruit in the nation.

== International competition ==
As noted previously, at the July, 2003 World Aquatics Championships in Barcelona, Spain, Domanic received a gold medal in women's water polo team competition, obtaining a 6-0 record in matches with other teams. Italy took the bronze and Russia took the silver.

At the early August, 2003 Pan American Games, in Santo Domingo, Domanic won another gold team medal in Water Polo with the team securing a record of 5-1. Canada won the silver and Brazil won the bronze.

At the August, 2005 World Junior Women's Water Polo Championships, in Perth, Australia, Dominac won a team gold medal in women's water polo with Russia taking the silver and Australia taking the bronze.

== 2004 Olympics ==
In a distinguished honor, Domanic made the 2004 U.S. Olympic water polo team, and served as an alternate for the 2004 Athens Olympics in Athens, Greece though she did not participate. The 2004 Olympics were only the second Olympics in which women would participate in water polo, though they would win medals in both 2000 and 2004. Domanic was coached by former UCLA Coach Guy Baker while part of the U.S. National Water Polo team, particularly in preparation for the 2004 Olympics.

== University California Los Angeles ==
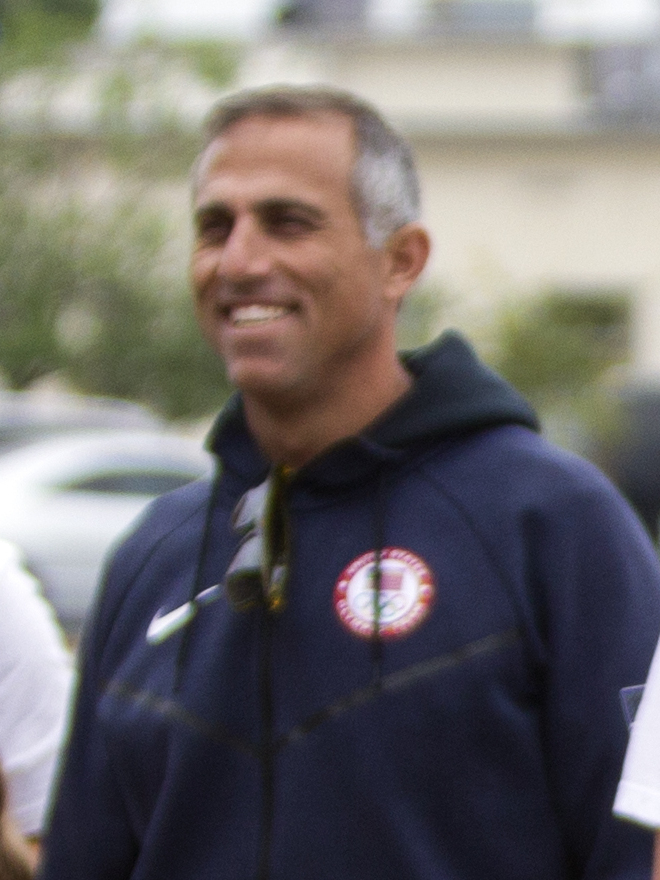
UCLA Coach Adam Krikorian

Domanic-Fernandez attended UCLA on a scholarship from 2004-2008, where she helped lead the women's water polo team to win NCAA Championships in four successive years under UCLA Hall of Fame Head Coach Adam Krikorian, a future Olympic coach. Krikorian began as a Co-Head Coach in 1999 for the UCLA women's water polo team, and was a Coach of the Year for National Women's Water Polo continuously from 2005-2008, during Domanic's tenure with the team.

An exceptional program, in both 2007 and 2008, in Domanic's Senior year, the Bruins women's water polo team was undefeated in regular season play. A high scoring left-handed shooter who excelled as an offensive player, Domanic often served as a utility player, switching perimeter positions to best take advantage of weaknesses in the defenses of opposing teams. As a Senior in 2008, Domanic attempted 92 goals, scoring on 34. As a Junior in 2007, she was credited with 32 of 76 attempted goals, and as a Sophomore in 2006, she had one of her highest shots on goal percentage, making 33 goals on 66 attempts for a 50% average. Her highest shooting percentage, was as a Freshman player with 74 attempts landing 38 goals. During her career with UCLA, she had 137 goals, 92 steals, and a total of 97 assists.

=== Careers ===
In 2009, Domanic-Fernandez played professional water polo for a year in Australia. In post-collegiate careers, Domanic-Fernandez received medical training at West Coast University and worked initially as a Nurse Practitioner in greater Orange County, California.

=== Honors ===
Though she received numerous other recognitions, in 2011, she became a member of the Jewish Sports Hall of Fame in Orange County.

== See also ==
- List of world champions in women's water polo
- List of World Aquatics Championships medalists in water polo
