= Alison Gregorka =

American water polo player (born 1985)

Personal information
- Born: June 29, 1985 (age 41) Ann Arbor, Michigan, U.S.

Sport
- Sport: Swimming, Water Polo
- Position: Likely Attacker/Driver
- College team: Stanford University
- Club: Ann Arbor Water Polo club
- Coached by: Eric Lancaster (Pioneer High); Will Hart (Pioneer High); John Tanner (Stanford); Guy Baker (08 Olympics)
Medal record
Women's water polo
Representing the United States
Olympic Games
Silver medal – second place	2008 Beijing	Team competition
World Championships
Gold medal – first place	2007 Melbourne	Team competition
Gold medal – first place	2009 Rome	Team competition

Alison Gregorka (born June 29, 1985) is an American water polo player who competed for Stanford University. She was a member of the US water polo team that won a silver medal in team competition at the 2008 Beijing Olympics.

== Early life and water polo ==
Gregorka was born June 29, 1985 in Ann Arbor, Michigan to Dave and Joan Gregorka and was one of four siblings that included Brad, Andrea, and Brian. She learned eye hand coordination and court awareness playing both soccer and basketball in her youth. Gregorka competed in swimming by the age of ten, entering freestyle and medley competitions, as she was competent in a variety of strokes, and performed in a few distance freestyle events in high school. She may have first taken to water polo as a sport in her early teens after attending one of her first games where her brother Brad was a player.

Alison attended and played high school water polo for Ann Arbor's Pioneer High, and played club water polo for Ann Arbor's Great Lakes Water Polo. In 2002, Alison helped lead Pioneer High School to the Michigan State team Championship, under first year women's Head Coach Will Hart. In 2001, she was coached at Pioneer by Eric Lancaster. Pioneer High held a 33-7 record that year, and had placed second in the Michigan State tournament in the prior year. During her high school water polo career, she was an MVP at the Tournament at Michigan State. Widely recognized in the sport, she was a Water Polo Player of the Year for Michigan in 2001. For all three years, 2001-3, she was named an All-American first team, and in 2000 was named a third team All-American. As a Senior, she served as a Captain of her swimming team, and earned letters each of her four high school years in both swimming and water polo. In 1999, she was an All-American honoree in swimming. Recognized as a scholar, in 2003, she was a swimming Academic All-American.

== Stanford University ==
Gregorka played NCAA women's water polo at Stanford University where she studied Urban Education and was coached in water polo by John Tanner. Leading a strong program, Tanner was credited with 10 NCAA championship team titles as Head Coach for Women's water polo at Stanford from 1998-2026. The Stanford women's water polo team placed placed first at the NCAA tournament in 2002, though Gregorka was not yet part of the team. Stanford women's water polo placed second or third at the NCAA national team Championships during each of Gregorka's years of tenure with the team. As a Senior at Stanford, she scored 22 season goals, and had a collegiate total of 65. She was part of the NCAA Championship's All-Tournament Second Team in 2007. Noted for her academics, she earned Mountain Pacific Sports Federation honors in 2007, with a grade point average of 3.32.

== 2008 Olympic silver medal ==
Gregorka was part of the 2008 Beijing women's team that won the silver medal at the 2008 women's water polo team competition. At the 2008 Olympics, the women's U.S. water polo team and the water polo team from Hungary won successive matches in the group competition, and proceeded to the semi-final heats, with the teams from Greece and Russia having been eliminated from contending for a medal. In the quarter-final heats, the women's teams from Australia and the Netherlands advanced to the semifinal heats, beating the teams from China and Italy, respectively. In the semi-final match, the U.S. women played against Australia in the semis, and beat them by a score of 9-8. The team from the Netherlands advanced from the semi-finals to the final round to determine the gold and silver medalists by beating the team from Hungary 8-7.

The U.S. team's final match for the gold and silver medals between the U.S. and the team from the Netherlands began with the Netherlands taking an early 4-0 lead, but by halftime the U.S. women rebounded and tied the score at halftime 5-5. The Netherlands's top scorer Daniëlle de Bruijn made the first two second half goals to give the Netherlands lead of 7-5, but the Americans rebounded once again with a critical goal by Gregorka that led to an 8-8 tie early in the fourth quarter. In a close and exciting game, the Netherlands' Daniëlle de Bruijn again scored with only 26 seconds left in the game, giving the Netherlands a team victory with a final 9-8 score, and the gold medal. In the last ten seconds of the game the Dutch women's goalie made two saves. The team from Australia took the bronze.

In June 2009, she was named to the USA water polo women's senior national team for the 2009 FINA World Championships.

In international competition, Alison won gold medals playing for the U.S. National team at the 2007 World Aquatics Championships in Melbourne, and the 2009 World Aquatic Championshiops in Rome. She won a gold in 2007 at the Pan American games in Rio de Janeiro.

== See also ==
- List of Olympic medalists in water polo (women)
- List of world champions in women's water polo
- List of World Aquatics Championships medalists in water polo
