= Brittany Hayes =

American water polo player (born 1985)

Personal information
- Born: February 7, 1985 (age 41) Orange County, California, U.S.
- Education: University of Southern California; Loyola Law School
- Occupation: Attorney
- Height: 170 cm (5 ft 7 in)
- Weight: 72 kg (159 lb)

Sport
- Sport: Water Polo
- Position: Utility Player (Foothill, USC)
- College team: University of Southern California
- Coached by: Dave Mikesell (Foothill High); Jovan Vavic (USC); Guy Baker ('08 Olympics)
Medal record
Women's water polo
Representing the United States
Olympic Games
Silver medal – second place	2008 Beijing	Team competition
World Championships
Gold medal – first place	2007 Melbourne	Team competition
Gold medal – first place	2009 Rome	Team competition

Brittany Hayes (born February 7, 1985) is an American water polo player who competed for the University of Southern California, and was a member of the US women's water polo team that won a silver medal at the 2008 Beijing Olympics.

== Early life, High School ==
Hayes was born in Orange County, California, on February 7, 1985, to David and Vicki Hayes and attended Foothill High School in Tustin, California, graduating around 2004. Hayes was influenced to try water polo as her brother Garrett played the sport for the University of Southern California. As an underclassman in 2001, and through her high school water polo career at Foothill, she was managed by Assistant Coach Dan Klatt and Head Coach Dave Mikesell, who led Foothill to six CIF championships during his reign before leaving as coach in 2010. In the 2001 season, the Foothill Water Polo team went 35-1 going into the Southern Section Division I Championship. She was a four-time CIF Champion while at Foothill High earning CIF Co-Player of the Year in her senior season. She was a Seaview League Most Valuable Player her Sophomore, Junior and Senior years in high school, and her team won the section title in the CIF in four successive years.During her high school years, from 1998-2001, she was a Junior Olympic All American.

=== Foothill Southern Section Championships ===
As a Junior at Foothill High in 2002, Brittany was named the Los Angeles Times Player of the Year, leading the team in season scoring with 92 goals, and playing outstanding defense against her opposing 2-meter Centers. During Dave Mikesell's tenure as coach and Hayes's tenure as a player with the Foothill Knights women's water polo, the team were CIF-Division I Southern Section Champions in four successive years from 2000-2003, and placed second in 2004.

== University of Southern California ==
Hayes attended the University of Southern California from around 2004-2008, graduating with a degree in International Relations. At USC, she was trained and mentored in water polo by Head Coach Jovan Vavic. In 2004, she was named the NCAA Tournament Most Valuable Player after the University of Southern California won the NCAA Championship. In a distinguished honor, she was a Peter J. Cutino Finalist in 2004 and 2005, an award given to that year's most outstanding Water Polo player. By the end of her Junior year at USC, she had scored 165 goals, ranking her as the 6th highest career scorers in USC history among women water polo players. In her Sophomore year in 2005, Hayes was USC's leading scorer with 51 goals. In her Freshman year in 2004, she led USC women in scoring with 59 goals, was a second team All-American, and All-Mountain Pacific Sports Federation Freshman League Honors.

Hayes later attended University of California, Irvine, for her graduate degree, then obtained a degree in Law from Loyola Law School in Los Angeles, California.

== 2008 Beijing Olympic silver ==
Hayes participated in the 2008 Beijing Olympics in the water polo team competition, where the U.S. team took a silver medal under the Olympic women's water polo Head Coach Guy Baker. The women's U.S. water polo team and the team from Hungary won successive matches in the group competition, and proceeded to the semi-final heats, with the teams from Greece and Russia having been eliminated from contending for a medal. In the quarter-final heats, the women's teams from Australia and the Netherlands advanced to the semifinal heats, beating the teams from China and Italy, respectively. In the semi-final match, the U.S. women played against Australia in the semis, and beat them by a score of 9-8. The team from the Netherlands advanced from the semi-finals to the final round by beating the team from Hungary 8-7. Hayes had two goals in the critical 9-8 semi-final victory against Australia which took the U.S. to the final gold and silver match against the Netherlands.

The final match for the gold and silver medals between the U.S. team and the team from the Netherlands began with the Netherlands taking an early 4-0 lead, but by halftime the U.S. women rebounded and tied the score at halftime 5-5. The Netherlands top scorer Daniëlle de Bruijn made the first two second half goals to give the Netherlands lead of 7-5, but the Americans rebounded once again tieing the game 8-8 early in the fourth quarter. In a close and exciting game, the Netherlands' Daniëlle de Bruijn again scored again with only 26 seconds left in the game, giving the Netherlands a team victory with a final 9-8 score, and the gold medal. In the last ten seconds of the game the Dutch women's goalie made two saves. The team from Australia took the bronze.

=== International competition ===
In June 2009, Hayes was named to the USA water polo women's senior national team for the 2009 FINA World Championships in Rome, Italy. She was a member of the 2007 USA water polo women's senior national team that captured a Gold medal at the 2007 FINA World Championships in Melbourne, Australia. In 2005, she was part of the U.S. team that too first place at the FINA Junior World Championships, in Perth, Australia. At the Holiday Cup in 2006 in Los Alamitos, California, her team took first place. At the 2007 Holiday Cup, she scored four goals, and her team won the gold medal. Her team won the gold at FINA Junior World Championship in 2005, and at the 2003 FINA Junior World Championship captured a silver medal.

After graduating law school, Hayes served as a workers compensation attorney in Orange County, California.

== See also ==
- List of Olympic medalists in water polo (women)
- List of world champions in women's water polo
- List of World Aquatics Championships medalists in water polo
