= Jaime Komer =

American water polo player (born 1981)

Personal information
- Full name: Jaime Elizabeth Komer
- Born: September 1, 1981 (age 45) Fresno, California, U.S.
- Occupations: Professional Water Polo; Sports, Nutrition Counselor
- Height: 183 cm (6 ft 0 in)
- Weight: 73 kg (161 lb)
- Spouse: Matt Komer (m. 2007)

Sport
- Sport: Water Polo
- Position: Goalkeeper
- College team: UCLA
- Club: Fresno Outlaws Club; Freemantle Mariners, Australia; Natación Alcorcón Arena, Spain (Pro)
- Coached by: Eric Sullivan (Edison High); Adam Krikorian (UCLA); Guy Baker (Olympics)
Medal record
Women's water polo
Representing the United States
Olympic Games
Silver medal – second place	2008 Beijing	Team competition
World Championships
Gold medal – first place	2007 Melbourne	Team competition
Gold medal – first place	2009 Rome	Team competition
Silver medal – second place	2005 Montreal	Team competition
FINA Water Polo World League
Gold medal – first place	2007 Montreal	Team competition
Pan American Games
Gold medal – first place	2007 Rio de Janeiro	Team competition

Jaime Elizabeth Komer ( née Hipp, born September 1, 1981) is a former female water polo goalkeeper from the United States, who competed for UCLA, and won a silver team medal at the 2008 Beijing Olympic Games. Prior to the 2008 Olympics, she played professionally in Australia and for the Spanish team Natación Alcorcón Arena, and later started the business AYT, a sports and lifestyle company with her husband Matt Komer.

Jaime was born September 1, 1981 in Fresno, California and attended Edison High School. A multi-sport athlete during her High School years, she competed in swimming, soccer and basketball, receiving three letters in both Water Polo and swimming where she excelled in both breaststroke and medley events. She was drawn to the sport of water polo, partly from following the career of her brother Dan who played water polo as a goalkeeper for the University of Irvine. While swimming for Edison High water polo Coach Eric Sullivan, she was voted All League First Team and twice voted a league Most Valuable Player. She captained her High School team in her Senior year, and was announced as an All-Valley first team honoree. In club play, Jaime was an All-American honoree as a member of the Fresno Outlaws Water Polo Club team, and competed for the Outlaws in the Junior Olympics in August, 1998.

== University of California Los Angeles ==
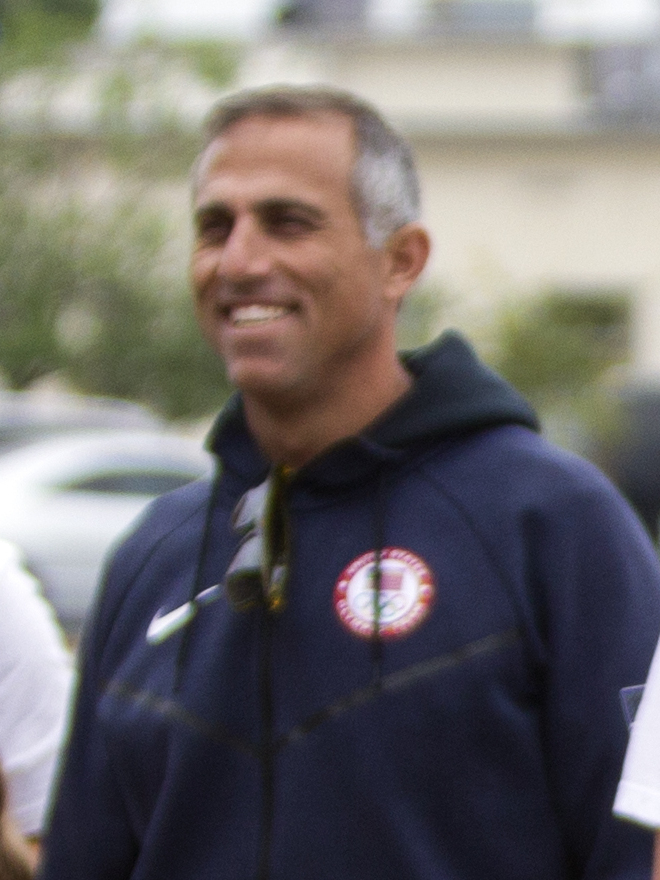
Coach Krikorian

As Jaime Hipp, she attended the University of California Los Angeles from around 1999-2003, where she was trained and mentored by Head women's coach Adam Krikorian, a former Water Polo athlete for UCLA, who would coach the U.S. Women's National Water Polo team beginning in 2009. Hipp Komer graduated with majors in psychology and French in 2003.

In 2001, the UCLA Women's Water Polo team won the NCAA National Championship at Stanford University, defeating Stanford 5-4. In her Junior collegiate year in 2002, she was named as an All-Mountain Pacific Sports Federation (MPSF) second-team honoree, and in 2002 was an NCAA and MPSF second team All-Tournament honoree. Playing as a college Senior in 2003, she helped take the UCLA women's water polo team to a second NCAA team Championship defeating Stanford 4-3 at U.C. San Diego, where she received the honor of being named to the NCAA All-Tournament Team. Throughout her college career, she served as a starting goal tender and was the recipient of All-American honors in all four years of her collegiate career.

== International highlights ==
Komer had numerous wins with the U.S. National team. She won a gold medal with the United States women's national water polo team at the 2007 World Championships in Melbourne, the 2009 World Championships in Rome, and the 2007 Pan American Games in Rio de Janeiro. Komer won another gold medal at the 2007 FINA Women's Water Polo World League in the team competition in Montreal.

== 2008 Beijing Olympic Silver ==
As Jaime Hipp Komer, she was part of the U.S. Women's Water polo team that won the silver medal at the Beijing Olympics, in the 2008 Olympic women's water polo competition where she was trained and managed by Olympic water polo Head Coach Guy Baker, a former coach of the water polo teams at Cal State Long Beach and UCLA. At the 2008 Olympics, the women's US team played the Australian team in the semifinals, beating them by a score of 9-8, but the Netherlands also made the final match by beating the team from Hungary by a score of 8-7. In the final game for the gold medal, the Netherlands went ahead by a score of 4-0, but the U.S. women were able to rebound, and tied the score 5-5, by the halftime break. The Netherlands soon scored in the second half taking a lead of 7-5 lead, but the American women came back, bringing the score to an 8-8 tie by the early fourth quarter. Daniëlle de Bruijn, the Netherland's top player, scored the winning goals with only 26 seconds remaining in the game, giving the Netherlands the gold medal and the American women the silver. The Netherlands goal tender had two saves in the games last ten seconds. Jaime did not play in the final game.

In June 2009, Komer was again named to the USA Water Polo Women's Senior National Team for the 2009 FINA World Championships, where the U.S. team won another Gold medal.

She and Matt Komer, a former professional volleyball player, were married August 5, 2007. They were both All-Americans and National Champions while at UCLA.

=== Professional pursuits ===
Prior to her time at the 2008 Olympics, in 2004-5, Jaime played club water polo in Australia for the Fremantle Mariners. While with the Mariners, she won two National League Championships. Later in 2005-6, she was part of Spanish Club team, C.N. Odarreta, Alcorcon.

Jaime and husband Matt Komer started their own business, AYT Lifestyle, a proactive lifestyle company that combines yoga, pilates, sport, nutrition, travel and philanthropy to initiate positive change. Their company is based in Orange County, California but serves customers worldwide.

== See also ==
- United States women's Olympic water polo team records and statistics
- List of Olympic medalists in water polo (women)
- List of women's Olympic water polo tournament goalkeepers
- List of world champions in women's water polo
- List of World Aquatics Championships medalists in water polo
