= Elsie Windes =

American water polo player (born 1985)

Personal information
- Full name: Elsie Ann Windes
- Born: June 17, 1985 (age 41) Portland, Oregon, U.S.
- Height: 5 ft 11 in (180 cm)

Sport
- Country: United States
- Sport: Water Polo
Medal record
Women's water polo
Representing the United States
Olympic Games
Gold medal – first place	2012 London	Team competition
Silver medal – second place	2008 Beijing	Team competition
World Championships
Gold medal – first place	2007 Melbourne	Team competition
Gold medal – first place	2009 Rome	Team competition
Pan American Games
Gold medal – first place	2011 Guadalajara	Team competition

Elsie Ann Windes (born June 17, 1985) is an American water polo player. After playing for the University of California, Berkeley, she joined the United States national team in 2006. She helped the U.S. win a silver medal at the 2008 Summer Olympics and a gold medal at the 2012 Summer Olympics.

== Career ==
=== High school ===
Windes played on the water polo team at Beaverton High School. She was the 2003 Oregon State MVP and led her team to the 2003 state championship. She also earned all-league honors three times.

=== College ===
Windes started her college career at the University of California, Berkeley in 2004. As a freshman, she scored 33 goals to rank second on the team. She led the Bears in scoring the following year, with 51 goals, and was a third team All-American. In 2006, Windes led the team again, with 40 goals. She was named to the All-American second team. She scored 23 goals as a senior in 2007. She has the eighth-most goals in school history.

=== International ===
Windes joined the U.S. senior national team in 2006. In 2007, she scored five goals in the FINA World League Super Final and four goals in the Pan American Games, helping the U.S. to first-place finishes in both tournaments. In 2008, Windes had five goals in the FINA World League Super Final, as the U.S. finished second. She won a silver medal with the U.S. at the 2008 Summer Olympics, scoring one goal.

At the 2009 FINA World Championships, Windes had six goals to help win the gold medal. She then scored five goals apiece during gold medal runs at the 2010 FINA World League Super Final and 2010 FINA World Cup. In 2011, Windes scored three goals in the FINA World League Super Final and four goals in the Pan American Games to help the U.S. earn a berth in the 2012 Summer Olympics. At the Olympics, she won a gold medal with the U.S.

== Awards ==
In 2020, Windes was inducted into the USA Water Polo Hall of Fame.

== Personal ==
Windes was born in Portland, Oregon. She resides in Huntington Beach, California. She is 5 feet 11 inches (1.80 m) tall. Her father and sister both played water polo.

== See also ==
- United States women's Olympic water polo team records and statistics
- List of Olympic champions in women's water polo
- List of Olympic medalists in water polo (women)
- List of world champions in women's water polo
- List of World Aquatics Championships medalists in water polo
