= Jessica Steffens =

American water polo player (born 1987)

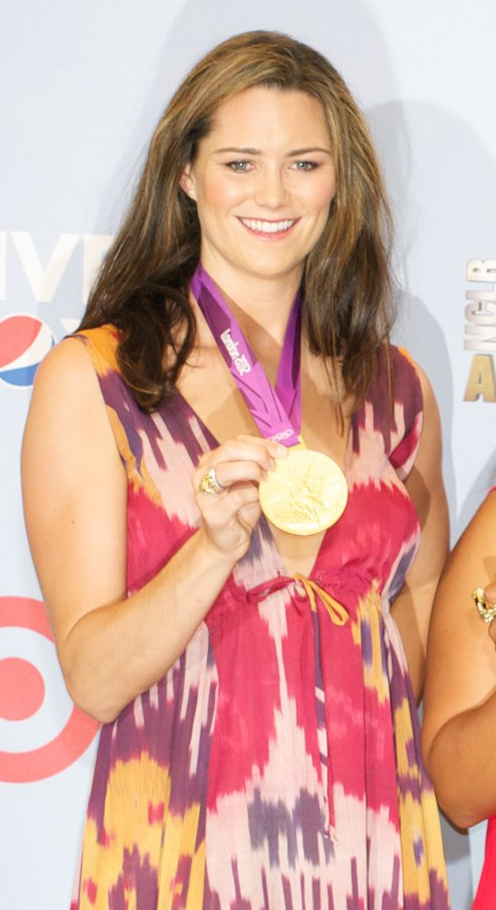
- Steffens at the 2012 ALMA Awards

Personal information
- Full name: Jessica Marie Steffens
- Born: April 7, 1987 (age 39) San Francisco, California, U.S.
- Height: 6 ft 0 in (183 cm)
Medal record
Women's water polo
Representing the United States
Olympic Games
Gold medal – first place	2012 London	Team competition
Silver medal – second place	2008 Beijing	Team competition
World Championships
Gold medal – first place	2009 Rome	Team competition
Pan American Games
Gold medal – first place	2007 Rio de Janeiro	Team competition
Gold medal – first place	2011 Guadalajara	Team competition

Jessica Marie Steffens (born April 7, 1987) is an American water polo player. She was a member of the United States national teams that won a silver medal at the 2008 Summer Olympics and a gold medal at the 2012 Summer Olympics. She also played at Stanford University.

== Personal life ==
Steffens was born in San Francisco, California to Peggy Schnugg and Carlos Steffens. Her father, a native of Puerto Rico, became interested in the sport of water polo after witnessing a match as a child in Puerto Rico. He played for Puerto Rico in three Pan American Games. Her father left the island and joined the water polo team of University of California, Berkeley, where he became a three-time All-American, leading the California Golden Bears to the 1977 NCAA championship. In 1979, he was the PAC-10 player of the year in water polo.

Steffens is 6 ft 0 in (183 cm) tall.

She has two sisters and one brother, who all played water polo. Her sister Maggie is also on the U.S. national team.

== Career ==
=== High school ===
Steffens, inspired by her father, played on the water polo team for four years at Monte Vista High School. She led the team to the NCS championship twice.

=== College ===
Steffens started her career at Stanford University as a freshman in 2006. She scored 15 goals that season, as the Cardinal finished third at the NCAA championships. The following year, she scored 35 goals, and Stanford finished second in the country.

Steffens redshirted the 2008 season to train with the U.S. national team while they prepared for the 2008 Olympics. She returned to Stanford in 2009, scored 12 goals, and was named to the All-MPSF first team and All-National Collegiate first team. In her senior year, she scored 17 goals, helping Stanford advance to the NCAA final.

=== International ===
Steffens scored five goals in the 2007 Pan American Games, as the U.S. finished first. At the 2008 Summer Olympics, she scored five goals, helping the U.S. win the silver medal, and was named to the Olympic Media All-Star team. At the 2009 FINA World Championships, she scored four times, and the U.S. won gold.

Steffens did not compete in 2010 following shoulder surgery. She returned in 2011 and helped the U.S. win the gold medal at the Pan American Games. She then won a gold medal with the U.S. at the 2012 Summer Olympics.

== Awards ==
In 2019, Steffens was inducted into the USA Water Polo Hall of Fame.

== See also ==
- United States women's Olympic water polo team records and statistics
- List of Olympic champions in women's water polo
- List of Olympic medalists in water polo (women)
- List of world champions in women's water polo
- List of World Aquatics Championships medalists in water polo
