= Tanya Gandy =

American water polo player (born 1987)

Personal information
- Born: August 20, 1987 (age 38) San Diego, California, United States

Sport
- Sport: Water polo
Medal record
Representing the United States
World Championships
Gold medal – first place	2009 Rome	Team competition

Tanya Gandy (born August 20, 1987) played water polo for UCLA on four of the five-consecutive NCAA National Champion Women's Water Polo teams and was named to the All-Tournament first team. She attended Rancho Bernardo High School.

In June 2009, Gandy was named to the USA Water Polo Women’s Senior National Team for the 2009 FINA World Championships.

== College career ==
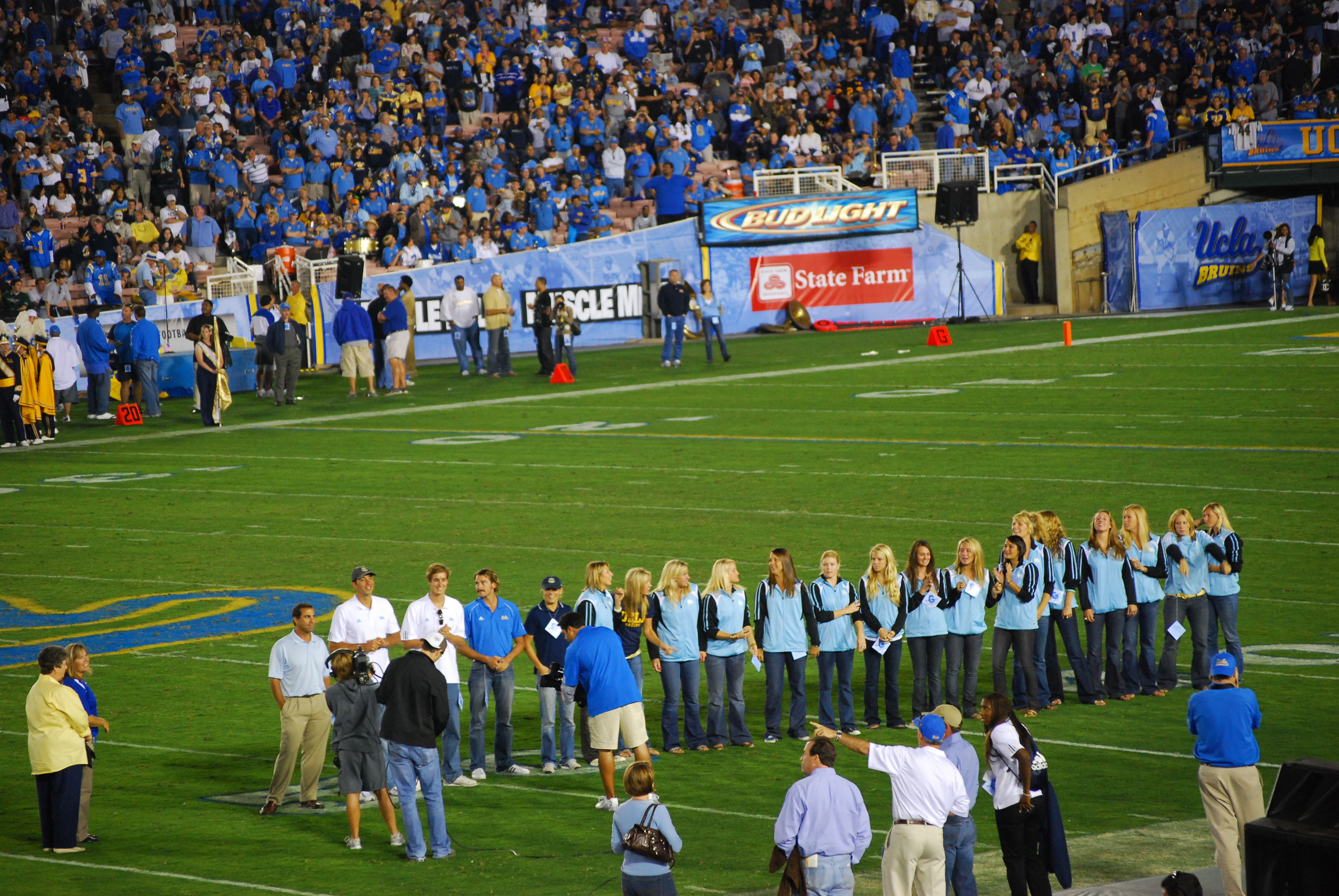
2007 Women's Water Polo team honored for winning UCLA's 100th NCAA Championship

Gandy, who wears #10 cap, is an attacker on the UCLA team. She and her senior teammates have never lost a championship tournament match. In her senior year, Gandy scored 79 goals, the highest single-season goal total in program history (eclipsing Coralie Simmons' 74-goal total from 1998). She scored 5 goals against San Jose State on March 14, 2009.

During the 2008 season, Gandy had 47 goals and 40 assists.

== Honors ==
Gandy earned NCAA Tournament most valuable player honor when she scored three goals in the 2009 tournament game against USC. She is one of three finalist for the female Peter J. Cutino Award, the highest honor for a college water polo player.

She was also named NCAA Division I Player of the Year and first-team All-America accolades by the Association of Collegiate Water Polo Coaches (ACWPC) in 2009.

In high school, she was All-CIF and All-League Player of the Year.

== See also ==
- List of world champions in women's water polo
- List of World Aquatics Championships medalists in water polo
