= Water polo at the 2019 World Aquatics Championships – Women's team rosters =

These are the rosters of all participating teams at the women's water polo tournament at the 2019 World Aquatics Championships.

Age as of the start of the tournament, 14 July 2019.

Abbreviations
Pos.	Position	No.	Cap number
FP	Field player	GK	Goalkeeper
CF	Centre forward	CB	Centre back
FW	Forward	D	Defender

== Group A ==
=== Netherlands ===
The following is the Dutch roster.

Head coach: Arno Havenga

№	Name	Pos.	Height	Weight	L/R	Date of birth	Club
1	Joanne Koenders	GK			R	February 28, 1997 (aged 22)	(Netherlands) Polar Bears
2	Maud Megens		1.84 m (6 ft 0 in)		R	February 6, 1996 (aged 23)	(United States) USC
3	Dagmar Genee (C)	CB	1.78 m (5 ft 10 in)		R	January 31, 1989 (aged 30)	(Netherlands) UZSC Utrecht
4	Sabrina van der Sloot		1.75 m (5 ft 9 in)		R	March 16, 1991 (aged 28)	(Italy) AS Orizzonte Catania
5	Iris Wolves	CF	1.80 m (5 ft 11 in)		R	May 9, 1994 (aged 25)	(Netherlands) Polar Bears
6	Nomi Stomphorst		1.73 m (5 ft 8 in)		R	August 23, 1992 (aged 26)	(Netherlands) GZC Donk
7	Bente Rogge		1.78 m (5 ft 10 in)		R	October 2, 1997 (aged 21)	(United States) Arizona State Sun Devils
8	Vivian Sevenich	CF	1.80 m (5 ft 11 in)		L	February 28, 1993 (aged 26)	(Hungary) UVSE
9	Maartje Keuning		1.78 m (5 ft 10 in)		R	February 26, 1998 (aged 21)	(Spain) CN Sant Andreu
10	Ilse Koolhaas		1.83 m (6 ft 0 in)		R	June 11, 1997 (aged 22)	(Italy) AS Orizzonte Catania
11	Simone van de Kraats				R	November 15, 2000 (aged 18)	(Netherlands) Polar Bears
12	Rozanne Voorvelt		1.77 m (5 ft 10 in)		R	April 25, 2001 (aged 18)	(Netherlands) ZVL-1886
13	Sarah Buis	GK	1.78 m (5 ft 10 in)		R	March 20, 2000 (aged 19)	(Netherlands) UZSC Utrecht

=== New Zealand ===
The following is the New Zealand roster.

Head coach: Angela Winstanley-Smith

No.	Name	Pos.	Height	Weight	L/R	Date of birth	Club
1	Jessica Milicich (C)	GK				13 September 1995 (aged 23)	
2	Emily Nicholson	FP				13 July 1998 (aged 21)	
3	Bernadette Doyle	FP				29 December 2000 (aged 18)	
4	Shinae Carrington	FP				18 October 2000 (aged 18)	
5	Elizabeth Alsemgeest	FP				9 January 2002 (aged 17)	
6	Morgan Mcdowall	FP				29 March 2002 (aged 17)	
7	Emmerson Houghton	FP				7 August 1999 (aged 19)	
8	Katie McKenty	FP				30 January 1996 (aged 23)	
9	Grace Tobin	FP				9 June 1997 (aged 22)	
10	Kaitlyn Howarth	FP				4 June 2000 (aged 19)	
11	Amanda Lemon	FP				16 July 1987 (aged 31)	
12	Kate Enoka	FP				5 April 1994 (aged 25)	
13	Bridget Layburn	GK				17 June 2001 (aged 18)	

=== South Africa ===
The following is the South African roster.

Head coach: Pierre le Roux

No.	Name	Pos.	Height	Weight	L/R	Date of birth	Club
1	Lauren Nixon	GK				22 January 1997 (aged 22)	
2	Yanah Gerber	FP				16 March 2001 (aged 18)	
3	Nthatisi Mota	FP				12 April 2000 (aged 19)	
4	Emma Joubert	FP				18 June 1998 (aged 21)	
5	Georgia Moir	FP				5 December 1997 (aged 21)	
6	Amica Hallendorff (C)	FP				26 October 1992 (aged 26)	
7	Emmerson Houghton	FP				17 January 2002 (aged 17)	
8	Lucy Miszewski	FP				16 February 2000 (aged 19)	
9	Kate Hinrichs	FP				30 December 2002 (aged 16)	
10	Jordan Wedderburn	FP				14 May 1997 (aged 22)	
11	Nicola Macleod	FP				16 February 1999 (aged 20)	
12	Christine Abrahamse	FP				18 January 1998 (aged 21)	
13	Zanne Smit	GK				3 March 2001 (aged 18)	

=== United States ===
The following is the American roster.

Head coach: Adam Krikorian

№	Name	Pos.	Height	Weight	L/R	Date of birth	Club
1	Amanda Longan	GK	6 ft 1 in (1.85 m)			January 16, 1997 (aged 22)	
2	Maddie Musselman		6 ft 0 in (1.83 m)			June 16, 1998 (aged 21)	
3	Melissa Seidemann		6 ft 0 in (1.83 m)			June 26, 1990 (aged 29)	
4	Rachel Fattal		5 ft 7 in (1.70 m)			December 10, 1993 (aged 25)	
5	Paige Hauschild		5 ft 10 in (1.78 m)			August 17, 1999 (aged 19)	
6	Margaret Steffens (C)		5 ft 9 in (1.75 m)			June 4, 1993 (aged 26)	
7	Stephania Haralabidis		5 ft 11 in (1.80 m)			May 19, 1995 (aged 24)	
8	Kiley Neushul		5 ft 8 in (1.73 m)			March 5, 1993 (aged 26)	
9	Aria Fischer		6 ft 0 in (1.83 m)			March 2, 1999 (aged 20)	
10	Kaleigh Gilchrist		5 ft 9 in (1.75 m)			May 16, 1992 (aged 27)	
11	Makenzie Fischer		6 ft 1 in (1.85 m)			March 29, 1997 (aged 22)	
12	Alys Williams		5 ft 11 in (1.80 m)			May 28, 1994 (aged 25)	
13	Ashleigh Johnson	GK	6 ft 1 in (1.85 m)			September 12, 1994 (aged 24)	

== Group B ==
=== Canada ===
The following is the Canadian roster.

Head coach: David Paradelo

No.	Name	Pos.	Height	Weight	L/R	Date of birth	Club
1	Jessica Gaudreault (C)	GK				18 July 1994 (aged 24)	
2	Krystina Alogbo	FP				20 January 1986 (aged 33)	
3	Axelle Crevier	FP				22 March 1997 (aged 22)	
4	Emma Wright	FP				16 November 1996 (aged 22)	
5	Monika Eggens	FP				25 December 1990 (aged 28)	
6	Kelly McKee	FP				16 June 1992 (aged 27)	
7	Joëlle Békhazi	FP				27 March 1987 (aged 32)	
8	Elyse Lemay-Lavoie	FP				12 November 1994 (aged 24)	
9	Hayley McKelvey	FP				11 March 1996 (aged 23)	
10	Kyra Christmas	FP				14 March 1997 (aged 22)	
11	Paul Kindred	FP				22 February 1996 (aged 23)	
12	Shae Fournier	FP				3 September 1992 (aged 26)	
13	Claire Wright	GK				2 February 1994 (aged 25)	

=== Hungary ===
The following is the Hungarian roster.

Head coach: Attila Bíró

No.	Name	Pos.	Height	Weight	L/R	Date of birth	Club
1	Edina Gangl	GK				25 June 1990 (aged 29)	
2	Dorottya Szilágyi	FP				10 November 1996 (aged 22)	
3	Rebecca Parkes	FP				16 August 1994 (aged 24)	
4	Gréta Gurisatti	FP				14 May 1996 (aged 23)	
5	Nataša Rybanská	FP				10 April 2000 (aged 19)	
6	Brigitta Horváth	FP				14 May 1996 (aged 23)	
7	Anna Illés	FP				21 February 1994 (aged 25)	
8	Rita Keszthelyi (C)	FP				10 December 1991 (aged 27)	
9	Dóra Leimeter	FP				8 May 1996 (aged 23)	
10	Anikó Gyöngyössy	FP				21 May 1990 (aged 29)	
11	Dóra Csabai	FP				20 April 1989 (aged 30)	
12	Vanda Vályi	FP				13 August 1999 (aged 19)	
13	Alda Magyari	GK				19 October 2000 (aged 18)	

=== Russia ===
The following is the Russian roster.

Head coach: Alexandr Gaidukov

No.	Name	Pos.	Height	Weight	L/R	Date of birth	Club
1	Evgeniia Golovina	GK				14 July 1999 (aged 20)	(Russia) Uralochka Zlatoust
2	Maria Bersneva	FP	1.87 m (6 ft 2 in)			17 December 1998 (aged 20)	(Russia) Uralochka Zlatoust
3	Ekaterina Prokofyeva (C)	FP	1.76 m (5 ft 9 in)			13 March 1991 (aged 28)	(Russia) Kinef Kirishi
4	Elvina Karimova	FP	1.66 m (5 ft 5 in)			25 March 1994 (aged 25)	(Russia) Uralochka Zlatoust
5	Tatiana Tolkunova	FP	1.74 m (5 ft 9 in)			15 May 1999 (aged 20)	(Russia) Spartak Volgograd
6	Olga Gorbunova	FP				27 August 1993 (aged 25)	(Russia) Spartak Volgograd
7	Alena Serzhantova	FP	1.87 m (6 ft 2 in)			6 May 1998 (aged 21)	(Russia) SKIF-CSP Krylatskoye
8	Anastasia Simanovich	FP	1.72 m (5 ft 8 in)			23 January 1995 (aged 24)	(Russia) Kinef Kirishi
9	Anna Timofeeva	FP	1.78 m (5 ft 10 in)			18 July 1987 (aged 31)	(Russia) Yugra
10	Evgenia Soboleva	FP				26 August 1988 (aged 30)	(Russia) Kinef Kirishi
11	Evgeniya Ivanova	FP	1.76 m (5 ft 9 in)			26 July 1987 (aged 31)	(Russia) Kinef Kirishi
12	Daria Ryzhkova	FP				8 February 1995 (aged 24)	(Russia) Kinef Kirishi
13	Anna Karnaukh	GK	1.73 m (5 ft 8 in)			31 August 1993 (aged 25)	(Russia) Kinef Kirishi

=== South Korea ===
The following is the Korean roster.

== Group C ==
=== Cuba ===
The following is the Cuban roster.

Head coach: Jorge del Valle

No.	Name	Pos.	Height	Weight	L/R	Date of birth	Club
1	Mairelis Zunzunegui (C)	GK				8 July 1986 (aged 33)	
2	Dalia Grau	FP				1 February 1995 (aged 24)	
3	Madonni Chávez	FP				3 November 1998 (aged 20)	
4	Thaimí González	FP				6 November 1995 (aged 23)	
5	Daniuska Carrasco	FP				7 August 1997 (aged 21)	
6	Mayelín Bernal	FP				12 October 1990 (aged 28)	
7	Jennifer Plasencia	FP				10 January 2000 (aged 19)	
8	Arisel González	FP				9 October 1998 (aged 20)	
9	Cecilia Díaz	FP				19 June 1996 (aged 23)	
10	Dianela Fría	FP				8 July 2000 (aged 19)	
11	Lisbeth Santana	FP				27 March 1991 (aged 28)	
12	Aliannis Ramírez	FP				23 September 1997 (aged 21)	
13	Arisney Ramos	GK				11 May 1989 (aged 30)	

=== Greece ===
The following is the Greek roster.

Head coach: Giorgos Morfesis

No.	Name	Pos.	Height	Weight	L/R	Date of birth	Club
1	Ioanna Stamatopoulou	GK				17 June 1998 (aged 21)	
2	Christina Tsoukala	FP				8 July 1991 (aged 28)	
3	Alkistis Benekou	FP				31 January 1994 (aged 25)	
4	Nikoleta Eleftheriadou	FP				17 January 1998 (aged 21)	
5	Maria Patra	FP				17 October 1998 (aged 20)	
6	Alkisti Avramidou	FP				26 February 1988 (aged 31)	
7	Alexandra Asimaki (C)	FP				28 June 1988 (aged 31)	
8	Ioanna Chydirioti	FP				15 March 1997 (aged 22)	
9	Christina Kotsia	FP				10 July 1994 (aged 25)	
10	Eirini Ninou	FP				20 September 2002 (aged 16)	
11	Eleftheria Plevritou	FP				23 March 1997 (aged 22)	
12	Eleni Xenaki	FP				5 July 1997 (aged 22)	
13	Marina Kotsioni	GK				25 March 1999 (aged 20)	

=== Kazakhstan ===
The following is the Kazakh roster.

Head coach: Marat Naurazbekov

No.	Name	Pos.	Height	Weight	L/R	Date of birth	Club
1	Alexandra Zharkimbayeva (C)	GK				31 July 1990 (aged 28)	
2	Tomiris Kenenbayeva	FP				20 July 1998 (aged 20)	
3	Aizhan Akilbayeva	FP				13 September 1991 (aged 27)	
4	Anna Turova	FP				31 July 1990 (aged 28)	
5	Kamila Zakirova	FP				25 December 1992 (aged 26)	
6	Darya Roga	FP				3 July 1995 (aged 24)	
7	Anna Novikova	FP				15 May 1999 (aged 20)	
8	Darya Muravyeva	FP				18 August 1998 (aged 20)	
9	Anastassiya Yeremina	FP				19 February 2000 (aged 19)	
10	Zamira Myrzabekova	FP				12 June 1991 (aged 28)	
11	Anastasiya Mirshina	FP				21 March 1996 (aged 23)	
12	Viktoriya Khritankova	FP				5 May 2001 (aged 18)	
13	Azhar Alibayeva	GK				18 February 2001 (aged 18)	

=== Spain ===
The following is the Spanish roster.

Head coach: Miki Oca

No.	Name	Pos.	Height	Weight	L/R	Date of birth	Club
1	Laura Ester	GK				22 January 1990 (aged 29)	
2	Marta Bach	FP				17 February 1993 (aged 26)	
3	Anni Espar	FP				8 January 1993 (aged 26)	
4	Beatriz Ortiz	FP				21 June 1995 (aged 24)	
5	Roser Tarragó	FP				25 March 1993 (aged 26)	
6	Irene González	FP				23 July 1996 (aged 22)	
7	Clara Espar	FP				29 September 1994 (aged 24)	
8	Pilar Peña (C)	FP				4 April 1986 (aged 33)	
9	Judith Forca	FP				7 June 1996 (aged 23)	
10	Paula Crespí	FP				7 April 1998 (aged 21)	
11	Maica García	FP				17 October 1990 (aged 28)	
12	Paula Leitón	FP				27 April 2000 (aged 19)	
13	Elena Sánchez	GK				22 October 1994 (aged 24)	

== Group D ==
=== Australia ===
The following is the Australian roster.

Head coach: Predrag Mihailović

No.	Name	Pos.	Height	Weight	L/R	Date of birth	Club
1	Gabriella Palm	GK				20 May 1998 (aged 21)	
2	Keesja Gofers	FP				16 March 1990 (aged 29)	
3	Hannah Buckling	FP				3 June 1992 (aged 27)	
4	Bronte Halligan	FP				12 August 1996 (aged 22)	
5	Isobel Bishop	FP				8 September 1991 (aged 27)	
6	Bronwen Knox	FP				16 April 1986 (aged 33)	
7	Rowena Webster (C)	FP				27 December 1987 (aged 31)	
8	Amy Ridge	FP				15 August 1996 (aged 22)	
9	Zoe Arancini	FP				14 July 1991 (aged 28)	
10	Lena Mihailović	FP				10 August 1996 (aged 22)	
11	Elle Armit	FP				20 August 1991 (aged 27)	
12	Madeleine Steere	FP				15 September 1996 (aged 22)	
13	Lea Yanitsas	GK				15 March 1989 (aged 30)	

=== China ===
The following is the Chinese roster.

Head coach: Gong Dali

No.	Name	Pos.	Height	Weight	L/R	Date of birth	Club
1	Peng Lin	GK				4 April 1995 (aged 24)	
2	Wang Xinyan (C)	FP				26 April 1991 (aged 28)	
3	Mei Xiaohan	FP				11 November 1996 (aged 22)	
4	Xiong Dunhan	FP				11 November 1998 (aged 20)	
5	Niu Guannan	FP				10 May 1992 (aged 27)	
6	Guo Ning	FP				23 January 1995 (aged 24)	
7	Wang Huan	FP				8 October 1997 (aged 21)	
8	Zhang Cong	FP				3 May 1990 (aged 29)	
9	Zhao Zihan	FP				4 September 1993 (aged 25)	
10	Zhang Danyi	FP				23 January 1995 (aged 24)	
11	Chen Xiao	FP				11 March 1999 (aged 20)	
12	Zhang Jing	FP				16 June 1996 (aged 23)	
13	Dong Wenxin	GK				12 March 2001 (aged 18)	

=== Italy ===
The following is the Italian roster.

Head coach: Fabio Conti

No.	Name	Pos.	Height	Weight	L/R	Date of birth	Club
1	Giulia Gorlero	GK				26 September 1990 (aged 28)	
2	Chiara Tabani	FP				27 August 1994 (aged 24)	
3	Arianna Garibotti	FP				9 December 1989 (aged 29)	
4	Silvia Avegno	FP				15 June 1997 (aged 22)	
5	Elisa Queirolo (C)	FP				6 March 1991 (aged 28)	
6	Rosaria Aiello	FP				12 May 1989 (aged 30)	
7	Domitilla Picozzi	FP				5 June 1998 (aged 21)	
8	Roberta Bianconi	FP				8 July 1989 (aged 30)	
9	Giulia Emmolo	FP				16 October 1991 (aged 27)	
10	Valeria Palmieri	FP				18 October 1993 (aged 25)	
11	Izabella Chiappini	FP				28 September 1995 (aged 23)	
12	Giulia Viacava	FP				1 September 1994 (aged 24)	
13	Federica Lavi	GK				22 February 1994 (aged 25)	

=== Japan ===
The following is the Japanese roster.

Head coach: Makihiro Motomiya

No.	Name	Pos.	Height	Weight	L/R	Date of birth	Club
1	Rikako Miura	GK				13 October 1989 (aged 29)	
2	Yumi Arima	FP				9 September 1997 (aged 21)	
3	Akari Inaba	FP				2 February 1998 (aged 21)	
4	Shino Magariyama	FP				20 September 1987 (aged 31)	
5	Chiaki Sakanoue	FP				5 June 1996 (aged 23)	
6	Miku Koide	FP				21 May 1992 (aged 27)	
7	Maiko Hashida	FP				23 December 2000 (aged 18)	
8	Yuki Niizawa	FP				12 February 1997 (aged 22)	
9	Minori Yamamoto	FP				14 October 1997 (aged 21)	
10	Misaki Noro	FP				12 April 1996 (aged 23)	
11	Marina Tokumoto	FP				2 February 1996 (aged 23)	
12	Kotori Suzuki (C)	FP				8 December 1996 (aged 22)	
13	Minami Shioya	GK				27 July 1997 (aged 21)	
