= Water polo at the 2015 World Aquatics Championships – Women's team rosters =

These are the rosters of all participating teams at the women's water polo tournament at the 2015 World Aquatics Championships in Kazan, Russia.

== Group A ==
=== Canada ===
- Jessica Gaudreault
- Krystina Alogbo
- Katrina Monton
- Emma Wright
- Monika Eggens
- Kelly McKee
- Joëlle Békhazi
- Shae Fournier
- Carmen Eggens
- Christine Robinson
- Stephanie Valin
- Dominique Perreault
- Nicola Colterjohn

=== Kazakhstan ===
- Alexandra Zharkimbayeva
- Aruzhan Yegemberdiyeva
- Aizhan Akilbayeva
- Anna Turova
- Kamila Zakirova
- Oxana Tikhonova
- Zamira Myrzabekova
- Oxana Saichuk
- Darya Muravyeva
- Darya Roga
- Anastassiya Mirshina
- Assem Mussarova
- Darya Ryzhinskaya

=== New Zealand ===
- Brooke Millar
- Nicole Lewis
- Sarah Pattison
- Danielle Lewis
- Simone Lewis
- Sarah Landry
- Miranda Chase
- Caitlin Lopes Da Silva
- Emma Stoneman
- Liana Dance
- Kirsten Hudson
- Jasmine Myles
- Katherine Curnow

=== Spain ===
- Laura Ester
- Marta Bach
- Anni Espar
- Paula Leitón
- Matilde Ortiz
- Jennifer Pareja
- Clara Espar
- Pilar Peña
- Judith Forca
- Roser Tarragó
- Maica García
- Laura López
- Patricia Herrera

== Group B ==
=== Australia ===
- Lea Yanitsas
- Gemma Beadsworth
- Hannah Buckling
- Holly Lincoln-Smith
- Keesja Gofers
- Bronwen Knox
- Rowie Webster
- Glennie McGhie
- Zoe Arancini
- Ash Southern
- Bronte Halligan
- Nicola Zagame
- Kelsey Wakefield

=== Greece ===
- Eleni Kouvdou
- Christina Tsoukala
- Stephania Haralabidis
- Christina Kotsia
- Margarita Plevritou
- Alkisti Avramidou
- Alexandra Asimaki
- Antigoni Roumpesi
- Ioanna Haralabidis
- Triantafyllia Manolioudaki
- Eleftheria Plevritou
- Eleni Xenaki
- Chrysoula Diamantopoulou

=== Netherlands ===
- Laura Aarts
- Yasemin Smit
- Dagmar Genee
- Sabrina van der Sloot
- Amarens Genee
- Nomi Stomphorst
- Marloes Nijhuis
- Vivian Sevenich
- Maud Megens
- Isabella van Toorn
- Lieke Klaassen
- Leonie van der Molen
- Debby Willemsz

=== South Africa ===
- Rebecca Thomas
- Megan Parkes
- Kieren Paley
- Ruby Versfeld
- Megan Schooling
- Amica Hallendorff
- Kimberly Kay
- Delaine Christien
- Lindsay Killeen
- Deborah O'Hanlon
- Kelsey White
- Alexandre Gaiscoigne

== Group C ==
=== Brazil ===
- Tess Oliveira
- Diana Abla
- Marina Zablith
- Mariana Duarte
- Lucianne Barroncas
- Izabella Chiappini
- Amanda Oliveira
- Luiza Carvalho
- Melani Dias
- Viviane Bahia
- Lorena Borges
- Gabriela Mantellato
- Victória Chamorro

=== Italy ===
- Giulia Gorlero
- Chiara Tabani
- Arianna Garibotti
- Elisa Queirolo
- Federica Radicchi
- Rosaria Aiello
- Tania Di Mario
- Roberta Bianconi
- Giulia Emmolo
- Francesca Pomeri
- Laura Barzon
- Teresa Frassinetti
- Laura Teani

=== Japan ===
Team roster

- Rikako Miura
- Chiaki Sakanoue
- Yuri Kazama
- Shino Magariyama
- Moe Nakata
- Ayaka Takahashi
- Yumi Nakano
- Mitsuki Hashiguchi
- Kana Hosoya
- Tsubasa Mori
- Marina Tokumoto
- Kotori Suzuki
- Yuko Umeda

=== United States ===
- Samantha Hill
- Madeline Musselmann
- Melissa Seidemann
- Rachel Fattal
- Alys Williams
- Margaret Steffens
- Courtney Mathewson
- Kiley Neushul
- Ashley Grossman
- Kaleigh Gilchrist
- Makenzie Fischer
- Kami Craig
- Ashleigh Johnson

== Group D ==
=== China ===
- Yang Jun
- Tian Jianing
- Mei Xiaohan
- Xiong Dunhan
- Niu Guannan
- Sun Yating
- Song Donglun
- Zhang Cong
- Zhao Zihan
- Zhang Weiwei
- Wang Xinyan
- Zhang Jing
- Peng Lin

=== France ===
- Lorène Derenty
- Estelle Millot
- Léa Bachelier
- Aurore Sacré
- Louise Guillet
- Géraldine Mahieu
- Marie Barbieux
- Marion Tardy
- Lucie Cesca
- Sonia Bouloukbachi
- Yaëlle Deschampt
- Michaela Jaskova
- Morgane Chabrier

=== Hungary ===
- Flóra Bolonyai
- Dóra Czigány
- Dóra Antal
- Dóra Kisteleki
- Gabriella Szűcs
- Orsolya Takács
- Anna Illés
- Rita Keszthelyi
- Ildikó Tóth
- Barbara Bujka
- Krisztina Garda
- Katalin Menczinger
- Edina Gangl

=== Russia ===
- Anastasia Verkhoglyadova
- Tatiana Zubkova
- Ekaterina Prokofyeva
- Elvina Karimova
- Ekaterina Zubacheva
- Anastasia Simanovich
- Ekaterina Lisunova
- Evgeniia Abdriziakova
- Anna Timofeeva
- Ekaterina Tankeeva
- Evgeniya Ivanova
- Nadezhda Iarondaikina
- Anna Karnaukh

== See also ==
- Water polo at the 2015 World Aquatics Championships – Men's team rosters
