= Water polo at the 2017 World Aquatics Championships – Women's team rosters =

These are the rosters of all participating teams at the women's water polo tournament at the 2017 World Aquatics Championships in Budapest, Hungary.

Abbreviations
Pos.	Position	№	Cap number
CF	Centre forward	CB	Centre back
D	Driver	GK	Goalkeeper

== Group A ==
=== Italy ===
The following is the Italian roster in the women's water polo tournament of the 2017 World Aquatics Championships.

Head coach: Fabio Conti

№	Name	Pos.	Height	Weight	L/R	Date of birth	2016/17 club
1	Giulia Gorlero	GK	1.79 m (5 ft 10 in)	70 kg (154 lb)	R	26 September 1990	(Italy) Cosenza Nuoto
2	Chiara Tabani	D	1.76 m (5 ft 9 in)	73 kg (161 lb)	R	27 August 1994	(Spain) Sabadell
3	Arianna Garibotti	D	1.69 m (5 ft 7 in)	71 kg (157 lb)	R	9 December 1989	(Italy) Orizzonte Catania
4	Elisa Queirolo (c)	D	1.68 m (5 ft 6 in)	63 kg (139 lb)	R	6 March 1991	(Italy) Plebiscito Padova
5	Federica Radicchi	D	1.69 m (5 ft 7 in)	64 kg (141 lb)	R	21 December 1988	(Italy) Waterpolo Messina
6	Rosaria Aiello	CF	1.74 m (5 ft 9 in)	74 kg (163 lb)	R	12 May 1989	(Italy) Waterpolo Messina
7	Domitilla Picozzi	D			R	5 June 1998	(Italy) SIS Roma
8	Roberta Bianconi	D	1.75 m (5 ft 9 in)	76 kg (168 lb)	R	8 July 1989	(Greece) Olympiacos
9	Giulia Emmolo	D	1.72 m (5 ft 8 in)	66 kg (146 lb)	L	16 October 1991	(Greece) Olympiacos
10	Valeria Palmieri	CF	1.76 m (5 ft 9 in)	102 kg (225 lb)	R	18 October 1993	(Italy) Orizzonte Catania
11	Aleksandra Cotti	D	1.66 m (5 ft 5 in)	64 kg (141 lb)	R	13 December 1988	(Italy) Rapallo
12	Sara Dario	D	1.77 m (5 ft 10 in)	63 kg (139 lb)	R	17 October 1994	(Italy) Plebiscito Padova
13	Federica Eugenia Lavi	GK			R	22 February 1994	(Italy) Rapallo

=== Brazil ===
The following is the Brazilian roster in the women's water polo tournament of the 2017 World Aquatics Championships.

Head coach: Eduardo Abla

№	Name	Pos.	Height	Weight	L/R	Date of birth	2016/17 club
1	Victória Chamorro	GK	1.74 m (5 ft 9 in)	78 kg (172 lb)	R	10 July 1996	
2	Diana Abla	D	1.75 m (5 ft 9 in)	75 kg (165 lb)	R	29 July 1995	
3	Marina Zablith (c)	CF	1.79 m (5 ft 10 in)	74 kg (163 lb)	R	4 March 1987	
4	Julia Souza	CB	1.72 m (5 ft 8 in)	78 kg (172 lb)	R	26 March 1999	
5	Ana Alice Amaral	D	1.63 m (5 ft 4 in)	57 kg (126 lb)	R	4 January 2000	
6	Kemily Leão	D	1.59 m (5 ft 3 in)	57 kg (126 lb)	R	22 March 2000	
7	Samantha Ferreira	D	1.70 m (5 ft 7 in)	57 kg (126 lb)	R	7 December 1997	
8	Mylla Bruzzo	CF	1.70 m (5 ft 7 in)	70 kg (154 lb)	R	20 April 1999	
9	Melani Dias	D	1.76 m (5 ft 9 in)	75 kg (165 lb)	R	14 November 1991	
10	Viviane Bahia	CB	1.76 m (5 ft 9 in)	67 kg (148 lb)	R	14 February 1994	
11	Mariana Duarte	D	1.70 m (5 ft 7 in)	72 kg (159 lb)	R	5 October 1996	
12	Letícia Belorio	D	1.71 m (5 ft 7 in)	62 kg (137 lb)	R	22 January 2001	
13	Raquel Sá	GK	1.79 m (5 ft 10 in)	75 kg (165 lb)	R	9 January 1998	

=== Canada ===
The following is the Canadian roster in the women's water polo tournament of the 2017 World Aquatics Championships.

Head coach: (Greece) Haris Pavlidis

№	Name	Pos.	Height	Weight	L/R	Date of birth	2016/17 club
1	Jessica Gaudreault	GK	1.71 m (5 ft 7 in)	61 kg (134 lb)	R	18 July 1994	(United States) Indiana Hoosiers
2	Krystina Alogbo (c)	CF	1.65 m (5 ft 5 in)	78 kg (172 lb)	R	20 January 1986	(Canada) CAMO
3	Axelle Crevier	CF			R	22 March 1997	(Canada) CAMO
4	Emma Wright	D	1.79 m (5 ft 10 in)	90 kg (198 lb)	L	16 November 1996	(United States) California Golden Bears
5	Monika Eggens	D	1.88 m (6 ft 2 in)	75 kg (165 lb)	R	25 December 1990	(Italy) Orizzonte Catania
6	Kyra Christmas	D			L	14 March 1997	(United States) Pacific Tigers
7	Joëlle Békhazi	D	1.70 m (5 ft 7 in)	66 kg (146 lb)	R	27 April 1987	(Canada) DDO Waterpolo
8	Elyse Lemay-Lavoie	CF			R	12 November 1994	(Canada) CAMO
9	Hayley McKelvey	D			R	11 March 1996	(United States) USC Trojans
10	Christine Robinson	CF	1.80 m (5 ft 11 in)	80 kg (176 lb)	R	17 May 1984	(Canada) DDO Waterpolo
11	Kelly McKee	CB	1.72 m (5 ft 8 in)	72 kg (159 lb)	R	16 June 1992	(France) Lille UC Métropole
12	Shae Fournier	D	1.70 m (5 ft 7 in)	65 kg (143 lb)	R	3 September 1992	(Canada) DDO Waterpolo
13	Ymane Hage	GK			R	18 June 1996	(United States) Hawaii Rainbow Wahine

=== China ===
The following is the Chinese roster in the women's water polo tournament of the 2017 World Aquatics Championships.

Head coach: Gong Dali

№	Name	Pos.	Height	Weight	L/R	Date of birth	2016/17 club
1	Peng Lin	GK	1.85 m (6 ft 1 in)	72 kg (159 lb)	R	4 April 1995	
2	Bi Yanan	CF			R	6 December 1998	
3	Mei Xiaohan	CB	1.80 m (5 ft 11 in)	97 kg (214 lb)	R	11 November 1996	
4	Xiong Dunhan	CF	1.81 m (5 ft 11 in)	77 kg (170 lb)	R	11 November 1998	
5	Niu Guannan	D	1.77 m (5 ft 10 in)	69 kg (152 lb)	R	10 May 1992	
6	Guo Ning	D			R	23 January 1995	
7	Nong Sanfeng	CB			R	11 February 1998	
8	Zhang Cong	D	1.76 m (5 ft 9 in)	65 kg (143 lb)	R	3 May 1990	
9	Zhao Zihan (c)	D	1.72 m (5 ft 8 in)	61 kg (134 lb)	L	4 September 1993	
10	Zhang Danyi	D	1.76 m (5 ft 9 in)	74 kg (163 lb)	R	23 January 1995	
11	Chen Xiao	CF			R	11 March 1999	
12	Zhang Jing	D	1.66 m (5 ft 5 in)	63 kg (139 lb)	L	16 June 1996	
13	Shen Yineng	GK	1.88 m (6 ft 2 in)	80 kg (176 lb)	R	18 January 1995	

== Group B ==
=== New Zealand ===
The following is the New Zealand roster in the women's water polo tournament of the 2017 World Aquatics Championships.

Head coach: Angela Winstanley-Smith

№	Name	Pos.	Height	Weight	L/R	Date of birth	2016/17 club
1	Jessica Milicich	GK			R	13 SEP 1995	
2	Nicole Lewis	CF	1.80 / 5'11"	80 / 176	R	26 JAN 1989	
3	Kelly Mason	CB	1.80 / 5'11"	85 / 187	R	16 JUN 1987	
4	Ricci Ferigo	D	1.68 / 5'6"	60 / 132	R	2 DEC 1995	
5	Alexandra Boyd (water polo) (C)	CB	1.75 / 5'9"	78 / 172	R	8 JUL 1991	
6	Bernadette Doyle	D	1.62 / 5'4"	58 / 128	L	29 DEC 2000	
7	Emmerson Houghton	D	1.75 / 5'9"	74 / 163	R	7 AUG 1999	
8	Caitlin Lopez da Silva	D	1.77 / 5'10"	68 / 150	R	20 JAN 1994	
9	Emma Stoneman	D	1.79 / 5'10"	75 / 165	R	10 NOV 1991	
10	Casie Bowry	CF	1.75 / 5'9"	90 / 198	R	10 APR 1991	
11	Kirsten Hudson	D	1.65 / 5'5"	70 / 154	L	2 FEB 1988	
12	Brydie Pye	D	1.77 / 5'10"	81 / 179	R	14 OCT 1993	
13	Antonia Young	GK	1.80 / 5'11"	74 / 163	R	18 JAN 1999	

=== South Africa ===
The following is the South Africa roster in the women's water polo tournament of the 2017 World Aquatics Championships.

Head coach: Samuel Gareth

№	Name	Pos.	Height	Weight	L/R	Date of birth	2016/17 club
1	Rebecca Thomas	GK	1.77 / 5'10"	74 / 163	R	17 SEP 1991	
2	Amber Penney	D			R	5 AUG 1997	
3	Kieren Paley	CF	1.63 / 5'4"	69 / 152	L	3 OCT 1990	
4	Shelley Kristy Faulmann	D			R	22 APR 1991	
5	Megan Schooling	CB	1.82 / 6'0"	82 / 181	R	1 MAY 1989	
6	Amica Hallendorff	D	1.64 / 5'5"	60 / 132	R	26 OCT 1992	
7	Carly Joy Wessels	D			R	13 OCT 1994	
8	Amy Keevy	D			R	13 JUL 1992	
9	Zandre Smit	CF			R	2 OCT 1998	
10	Marcelle Manson	CB	1.69 / 5'7"	60 / 132	R	25 OCT 1984	
11	Nicola Barrett	D			L	18 FEB 1993	
12	Kelsey White (C)	CB	1.76 / 5'9"	83 / 183	R	18 SEP 1990	
13	Lauren Nixon	GK			R	22 JAN 1997	

=== Spain ===
The following is the Spanish roster in the women's water polo tournament of the 2017 World Aquatics Championships.

Head coach: Miguel Oca Gaia

№	Name	Pos.	Height	Weight	L/R	Date of birth	2016/17 club
1	Laura Ester Ramos	GK	1.77 / 5'10"	58 / 128	R	22 JAN 1990	
2	Marta Bach Pascual	CB	1.76 / 5'9"	66 / 146	R	17 FEB 1993	
3	Anna Espar Llaquet	D	1.80 / 5'11"	67 / 148	R	8 JAN 1993	
4	Beatriz Ortiz Munoz	D			R	21 JUN 1995	
5	Matilde Ortiz Reyes	CB	1.74 / 5'9"	67 / 148	R	16 SEP 1990	
6	Helena Lloret Gomez	D			L	5 JUN 1992	
7	Clara Espar Llaquet	D	1.77 / 5'10"	70 / 154	R	29 SEP 1994	
8	María del Pilar Peña Carrasco (C)	D	1.74 / 5'9"	61 / 134	L	4 APR 1986	
9	Judith Forca Ariza	D	1.73 / 5'8"	66 / 146	L	7 JUN 1996	
10	Paula Crespí Barriga	CF			R	7 APR 1998	
11	Anna Gual Rovirosa	CF			R	30 MAY 1996	
12	Paula Leitón Arrones	CF	1.87 / 6'2"	96 / 212	R	27 APR 2000	
13	Sandra Domene Pérez	GK			R	4 APR 2000	

=== United States ===
The following is the United States roster in the women's water polo tournament of the 2017 World Aquatics Championships.

Head coach: Adam Krikorian

№	Name	Pos.	Height	Weight	L/R	Date of birth	2016/17 club
1	Gabrielle Stone	GK	1.83 / 6'0"		R	7 MAR 1994	
2	Madeline Musselman	D	1.83 / 6'0"		R	16 JUN 1998	
3	Melissa Seidemann	CB	1.83 / 6'0"		R	26 JUN 1990	
4	Rachel Fattal	D	1.69 / 5'7"		R	10 DEC 1993	
5	Paige Hauschild	D			R	17 AUG 1999	
6	Margaret Steffens (C)	D	1.75 / 5'9"		R	4 JUN 1993	
7	Jordan Raney	CB			R	2 JUN 1996	
8	Kiley Neushul	D	1.73 / 5'8"		R	5 MAR 1993	
9	Aria Fischer	CF	1.83 / 6'0"		R	2 MAR 1999	
10	Jamie Neushul	D			R	12 MAY 1995	
11	Makenzie Fischer	CB	1.86 / 6'1"		R	29 MAR 1997	
12	Alys Williams	CB	1.81 / 5'11"		R	28 MAY 1994	
13	Amanda Longan	GK			R	16 JAN 1997	

== Group C ==
=== Japan ===
The following is the Japanese roster in the women's water polo tournament of the 2017 World Aquatics Championships.

Head coach: Hideo Katho

№	Name	Pos.	Height	Weight	L/R	Date of birth	2016/17 club
1	Miyuu Aoki	GK			R	8 JUL 1993	
2	Yumi Arima	CB			R	9 SEP 1997	
3	Yuri Kazama	D	1.60 / 5'3"	59 / 130	R	3 OCT 1996	
4	Shino Magariyama	CB	1.66 / 5'5"	60 / 132	R	20 SEP 1987	
5	Chiaki Sakanoue	D	1.66 / 5'5"	57 / 126	R	5 JUN 1996	
6	Minori Yamamoto	CF			R	14 OCT 1997	
7	Akari Inaba	D			R	2 FEB 1998	
8	Yuki Niizawa	D			L	13 FEB 1997	
9	Kana Hosoya	D	1.60 / 5'3"	56 / 123	R	13 OCT 1994	
10	Misaki Noro	D			L	12 APR 1996	
11	Marina Tokumoto	CB	1.64 / 5'5"	56 / 123	R	2 FEB 1996	
12	Kotori Suzuki (C)	D	1.65 / 5'5"	52 / 115	R	8 DEC 1996	
13	Minami Shioya	GK			R	27 JUL 1997	

=== Netherlands ===
The following is the Dutch roster in the women's water polo tournament of the 2017 World Aquatics Championships.

Head coach: Arno Havenga

№	Name	Pos.	Height	Weight	L/R	Date of birth	2016/17 club
1	Laura Aarts	GK	1.75 / 5'9"	70 / 154	R	10 AUG 1996	
2	Yasemin Smit (C)	CB	1.80 / 5'11"	71 / 157	R	21 NOV 1984	
3	Dagmar Genee	CB	1.78 / 5'10"	68 / 150	R	31 JAN 1989	
4	Sabrina van der Sloot	D	1.75 / 5'9"	67 / 148	R	16 MAR 1991	
5	Amarens Genee	CF	1.74 / 5'9"	69 / 152	R	22 FEB 1991	
6	Nomi Stomphorst	D	1.73 / 5'8"	67 / 148	R	23 AUG 1992	
7	Marloes Nijhuis	CB	1.78 / 5'10"	70 / 154	R	14 MAR 1991	
8	Vivian Sevenich	CF	1.80 / 5'11"	74 / 163	L	28 FEB 1993	
9	Maud Megens	D	1.83 / 6'0"	68 / 150	R	6 FEB 1996	
10	Ilse Koolhaas	CB			R	11 JUN 1997	
11	Lieke Klaassen	CB	1.82 / 6'0"	78 / 172	R	23 APR 1991	
12	Kitty-Lynn Joustra	CF	1.77 / 5'10"	72 / 159	R	11 JAN 1998	
13	Debby Willemsz	GK	1.74 / 5'9"	73 / 161	R	10 MAY 1994	

=== Hungary ===
The following is the Japanese roster in the women's water polo tournament of the 2017 World Aquatics Championships.

Head coach: Attila Biro

№	Name	Pos.	Height	Weight	L/R	Date of birth	2016/17 club
1	Edina Gangl	GK	1.80 / 5'11"	70 / 154	R	25 JUN 1990	
2	Dora Czigany	D	1.73 / 5'8"	60 / 132	R	23 OCT 1992	
3	Dora Antal	D	1.68 / 5'6"	67 / 148	R	9 SEP 1993	
4	Greta Gurisatti	D	1.76 / 5'9"	70 / 154	R	14 MAY 1996	
5	Gabriella Szucs	CB	1.83 / 6'0"	74 / 163	R	7 MAR 1988	
6	Orsolya Takacs	CB	1.90 / 6'3"	83 / 183	R	20 MAY 1985	
7	Anna Illes	D	1.80 / 5'11"	73 / 161	R	21 FEB 1994	
8	Rita Keszthelyi (C)	D	1.78 / 5'10"	67 / 148	R	10 DEC 1991	
9	Ildiko Toth	CF	1.76 / 5'9"	70 / 154	R	23 APR 1987	
10	Barbara Bujka	CF	1.73 / 5'8"	77 / 170	L	5 SEP 1986	
11	Dora Csabai	CB	1.75 / 5'9"	63 / 139	R	20 APR 1989	
12	Dorottya Szilágyi	D			R	10 NOV 1996	
13	Orsolya Kaso	GK	1.87 / 6'2"	72 / 159	R	22 NOV 1988	

=== France ===
The following is the French roster in the women's water polo tournament of the 2017 World Aquatics Championships.

Head coach: Florian Bruzzo

№	Name	Pos.	Height	Weight	L/R	Date of birth	2016/17 club
1	Lou Louise Counil	GK	1.83 / 6'0"	72 / 159	R	7 NOV 1985	
2	Estelle Millot	D	1.64 / 5'5"	50 / 110	R	21 DEC 1993	
3	Lea Bachelier	D	1.78 / 5'10"	70 / 154	R	13 FEB 1993	
4	Aurore Sacre	D	1.72 / 5'8"	69 / 152	R	13 APR 1993	
5	Louise Guillet (C)	D	1.75 / 5'9"	70 / 154	R	31 JAN 1986	
6	Geraldine Mahieu	CF	1.86 / 6'1"	71 / 157	R	15 SEP 1993	
7	Clementine Valverde	D	1.65 / 5'5"	66 / 146	R	23 SEP 1992	
8	Aurelie Battu	CF	1.81 / 5'11"	78 / 172	R	18 SEP 1997	
9	Adeline Sacre	D	1.69 / 5'7"	61 / 134	R	12 MAR 1998	
10	Yaelle Deschampt	CB	1.71 / 5'7"	65 / 143	R	28 APR 1997	
11	Marie Barbieux	CB	1.78 / 5'10"	69 / 152	R	12 AUG 1991	
12	Audrey Daule	D	1.54 / 5'1"	52 / 115	R	6 MAY 1993	
13	Lorene Derenty	GK	1.69 / 5'7"	58 / 128	R	4 SEP 1994	

== Group D ==
=== Greece ===
The following is the Greece roster.

Head coach: Georgios Morfesis

№	Name	Pos.	Height	Weight	L/R	Date of birth	Club
1	Eleni Kouvdou	GK	1.75 m	64 kg	R	9 August 1989 (age 37)	
2	Christina Tsoukala	D	1.84	74	R	8 July 1991 (age 35)	
3	Vasiliki Diamantopoulou	CB	1.80 / 5'11"	74 / 163	R	12 March 1993 (age 33)	
4	Nikoleta Eleftheriadou	D	1.74 / 5'9"	64 / 141	R	17 January 1998 (age 28)	
5	Margarita Plevritou	CB	1.77 / 5'10"	70 / 154	R	17 November 1994 (age 31)	
6	Alkisti Avramidou	D	1.70 / 5'7"	58 / 128	R	26 February 1988 (age 38)	
7	Alexandra Asimaki (C)	CF	1.70 / 5'7"	65 / 143	R	28 June 1988 (age 38)	
8	Ioanna Chydirioti	D	1.74 / 5'9"	64 / 141	R	15 April 1997 (age 29)	
9	Christina Kotsia	CB	1.78 / 5'10"	77 / 170	R	10 July 1994 (age 32)	
10	Triantafyllia Manolioudaki	D	1.70 / 5'7"	62 / 137	R	19 March 1986 (age 40)	
11	Eleftheria Plevritou	D	1.77 / 5'10"	66 / 146	R	23 April 1997 (age 29)	
12	Eleni Xenaki	FP	1.77 / 5'10"	80 / 176	L	5 July 1997 (age 29)	
13	Chrysoula Diamantopoulou	GK	1.85 / 6'1"	72 / 159	L	22 September 1995 (age 30)	

=== Australia ===
The following is the Australia roster.

Head coach: Athansios Kechagias

№	Name	Pos.	Height	Weight	L/R	Date of birth	Club
1	Lea Yanitsas	GK	1.72 / 5'8"	78 / 172	R	15 March 1989 (age 37)	
2	Keesja Gofers	D	1.78 / 5'10"	70 / 154	R	16 March 1990 (age 36)	
3	Hannah Buckling	CB	1.77 / 5'10"	80 / 176	R	3 June 1992 (age 34)	
4	Bronte Halligan	D	1.80 / 5'11"	70 / 154	R	12 August 1996 (age 30)	
5	Isobel Bishop	D	1.80 / 5'11"	70 / 154	L	8 September 1991 (age 34)	
6	Amy Ridge	CB			R	15 August 1996 (age 30)	
7	Rowie Webster (C)	D	1.77 / 5'10"	81 / 179	R	27 December 1987 (age 38)	
8	Jessica Zimmerman	D			R	21 February 1995 (age 31)	
9	Zoe Arancini	D	1.70 / 5'7"	73 / 161	R	14 July 1991 (age 35)	
10	Lena Mihailovic	D			R	10 August 1996 (age 30)	
11	Morgan Baxter	D			L	24 June 1993 (age 33)	
12	Madeleine Steere	CB			R	15 September 1996 (age 29)	
13	Lilian Hedges	GK			R	3 January 1994 (age 32)	

=== Russia ===
The following is the Russia roster.

Head coach: Alexander Gaidukov

№	Name	Pos.	Height	Weight	L/R	Date of birth	Club
1	Anna Ustiukhina	GK	1.76 / 5'9"	70 / 154	R	18 March 1985 (age 41)	
2	Veronika Vakhitova	CB			R	13 June 1998 (age 28)	
3	Ekaterina Prokofyeva (C)	D	1.76 / 5'9"	70 / 154	R	13 March 1991 (age 35)	
4	Elvina Karimova	D	1.66 / 5'5"	63 / 139	R	25 March 1994 (age 32)	
5	Maria Borisova	CB	1.84 / 6'0"	92 / 203	R	28 July 1997 (age 29)	
6	Olga Gorbunova	D			R	27 August 1993 (age 33)	
7	Alena Serzhantova	D			R	6 May 1998 (age 28)	
8	Anastasia Simanovich	CF	1.72 / 5'8"	69 / 152	R	23 January 1995 (age 31)	
9	Anna Timofeeva	CF	1.78 / 5'10"	86 / 190	R	18 July 1987 (age 39)	
10	Tatiana Tolkunova	CB			R	15 May 1999 (age 27)	
11	Evgeniya Ivanova	D	1.76 / 5'9"	66 / 146	R	26 July 1987 (age 39)	
12	Daria Ryzhkova	D			R	8 February 1995 (age 31)	
13	Anna Karnaukh	GK	1.73 / 5'8"	60 / 132	R	31 August 1993 (age 33)	

=== Kazakhstan ===
The following is the Kazakhstan roster.

Head coach: Andrey Sazykin

№	Name	Pos.	Height	Weight	L/R	Date of birth	Club
1	Alexandra Zharkimbayeva	GK	1.70 / 5'7"	64 / 141	R	31 July 1990 (age 36)	
2	Sivilya Raiter	CF			R	25 May 2000 (age 26)	
3	Aizhan Akilbayeva	D	1.70 / 5'7"	70 / 154	R	13 September 1991 (age 34)	
4	Anna Turova	CB	1.71 / 5'7"	66 / 146	R	31 July 1990 (age 36)	
5	Kamila Zakirova	D	1.78 / 5'10"	65 / 143	R	25 December 1992 (age 33)	
6	Darya Roga	D	1.68 / 5'6"	59 / 130	L	3 July 1995 (age 31)	
7	Anna Novikova	D			L	15 April 1999 (age 27)	
8	Oxana Saichuk	CB	1.74 / 5'9"	62 / 137	R	9 December 1995 (age 30)	
9	Anastassiya Yeremina	CB	1.73 / 5'8"	57 / 126	R	19 February 2000 (age 26)	
10	Zamira Myrzabekova	CF	1.68 / 5'6"	68 / 150	R	12 June 1991 (age 35)	
11	Anastassiya Mirshina	D	1.75 / 5'9"	66 / 146	R	21 March 1996 (age 30)	
12	Assem Mussarova (C)	D	1.68 / 5'6"	59 / 130	R	13 August 1990 (age 36)	
13	Azhar Alibayeva	GK			R	18 February 2001 (age 25)	
