= Water polo at the 2017 Summer Universiade – Women's tournament =

Women's water polo at the XXIX Summer Universiade
- Venue: Taipei Songshan Sports Center Swimming Pool; National Taiwan Sport University Arena
- Dates: 18–29 August
- Teams: 12

Medalists
1st place, gold medalist(s)		United States
2nd place, silver medalist(s)		Hungary
3rd place, bronze medalist(s)		Japan

Women's water polo at the 2017 Summer Universiade was held in Taipei, Taiwan, from 18 to 29 August 2017.

== Results ==
All times are Taiwan Standard Time (UTC+08:00)

=== Preliminary round ===
Qualified for the Final eight
Qualified for the 9th-12th place classification playoffs

==== Group A ====
Team	Pld	W	D	L	GF	GA	GD	Pts
Russia	5	5	0	0	95	44	+51	10
Hungary	5	3	0	2	76	35	+41	6
Japan	5	3	0	2	64	60	+4	6
Canada	5	3	0	2	69	43	+26	6
Great Britain	5	0	1	4	26	104	−78	1
New Zealand	5	0	1	4	32	76	−44	1

18 August 2017; 09:00	Report	Canada	15–4	New Zealand	Taipei Songshan Sports Center Swimming Pool; Referees: Sebastien Dervieux (FRA); Erwin Schapers (NED)
18 August 2017; 09:00	Report	Score by quarters: 6–0, 2–0, 4–1, 3–3			Taipei Songshan Sports Center Swimming Pool; Referees: Sebastien Dervieux (FRA); Erwin Schapers (NED)
18 August 2017; 09:00	Report	Lemay Lavoie 4	Goals	four players 1	Taipei Songshan Sports Center Swimming Pool; Referees: Sebastien Dervieux (FRA); Erwin Schapers (NED)

18 August 2017; 10:20	Report	Hungary	17–6	Japan	Taipei Songshan Sports Center Swimming Pool; Referees: Igor Virigevic (SRB); Humberto Navarro (USA)
18 August 2017; 10:20	Report	Score by quarters: 5–2, 5–0, 3–1, 4–3			Taipei Songshan Sports Center Swimming Pool; Referees: Igor Virigevic (SRB); Humberto Navarro (USA)
18 August 2017; 10:20	Report	Szilágyi 5	Goals	Arima 4	Taipei Songshan Sports Center Swimming Pool; Referees: Igor Virigevic (SRB); Humberto Navarro (USA)

18 August 2017; 11:40	Report	Russia	25–5	Great Britain	Taipei Songshan Sports Center Swimming Pool; Referees: Ursula Wengenroth (SUI); Amber Drury (USA)
18 August 2017; 11:40	Report	Score by quarters: 6–0, 6–0, 5–2, 8–3			Taipei Songshan Sports Center Swimming Pool; Referees: Ursula Wengenroth (SUI); Amber Drury (USA)
18 August 2017; 11:40	Report	Zubkova, Gorbunova 5	Goals	Huck 2	Taipei Songshan Sports Center Swimming Pool; Referees: Ursula Wengenroth (SUI); Amber Drury (USA)

20 August 2017; 10:20	Report	New Zealand	10–14	Japan	Taipei Songshan Sports Center Swimming Pool; Referees: Humberto Navarro (USA); Michael Baty (RSA)
20 August 2017; 10:20	Report	Score by quarters: 3–4, 2–5, 3–3, 2–2			Taipei Songshan Sports Center Swimming Pool; Referees: Humberto Navarro (USA); Michael Baty (RSA)
20 August 2017; 10:20	Report	Lopes da Silva 5	Goals	Arima, Yamamoto 3	Taipei Songshan Sports Center Swimming Pool; Referees: Humberto Navarro (USA); Michael Baty (RSA)

20 August 2017; 11:40	Report	Great Britain	3–28	Hungary	Taipei Songshan Sports Center Swimming Pool; Referees: Sebastien Dervieux (FRA); Jang Shi-young (KOR)
20 August 2017; 11:40	Report	Score by quarters: 1–8, 1–6, 1–6, 0–8			Taipei Songshan Sports Center Swimming Pool; Referees: Sebastien Dervieux (FRA); Jang Shi-young (KOR)
20 August 2017; 11:40	Report	three players 1	Goals	Szilágyi 7	Taipei Songshan Sports Center Swimming Pool; Referees: Sebastien Dervieux (FRA); Jang Shi-young (KOR)

20 August 2017; 13:00	Report	Canada	11–17	Russia	Taipei Songshan Sports Center Swimming Pool; Referees: Andrew Carney (AUS); Leonadro Ceccarelli (ITA)
20 August 2017; 13:00	Report	Score by quarters: 2–4, 3–4, 1–4, 5–5			Taipei Songshan Sports Center Swimming Pool; Referees: Andrew Carney (AUS); Leonadro Ceccarelli (ITA)
20 August 2017; 13:00	Report	Lemay-Lavoie, Fournier 3	Goals	three players 3	Taipei Songshan Sports Center Swimming Pool; Referees: Andrew Carney (AUS); Leonadro Ceccarelli (ITA)

22 August 2017; 10:20	Report	Japan	18–4	Great Britain	Taipei Songshan Sports Center Swimming Pool; Referees: Sebastien Dervieux (FRA); Amber Drury (USA)
22 August 2017; 10:20	Report	Score by quarters: 4–1, 4–1, 3–1, 7–1			Taipei Songshan Sports Center Swimming Pool; Referees: Sebastien Dervieux (FRA); Amber Drury (USA)
22 August 2017; 10:20	Report	Arima, Niizawa 3	Goals	Hesketh 2	Taipei Songshan Sports Center Swimming Pool; Referees: Sebastien Dervieux (FRA); Amber Drury (USA)

22 August 2017; 11:40	Report	Russia	23–3	New Zealand	Taipei Songshan Sports Center Swimming Pool; Referees: Andrew Carney (AUS); Chang Wan Yu (TPE)
22 August 2017; 11:40	Report	Score by quarters: 4–0, 7–2, 7–0, 5–1			Taipei Songshan Sports Center Swimming Pool; Referees: Andrew Carney (AUS); Chang Wan Yu (TPE)
22 August 2017; 11:40	Report	Simanovich 5	Goals	Nicholson 2	Taipei Songshan Sports Center Swimming Pool; Referees: Andrew Carney (AUS); Chang Wan Yu (TPE)

22 August 2017; 13:00	Report	Hungary	5–8	Canada	Taipei Songshan Sports Center Swimming Pool; Referees: Andreas Moiralis (GRE); Radu-Sorin Matache (ROU)
22 August 2017; 13:00	Report	Score by quarters: 1–3, 2–1, 1–2, 1–2			Taipei Songshan Sports Center Swimming Pool; Referees: Andreas Moiralis (GRE); Radu-Sorin Matache (ROU)
22 August 2017; 13:00	Report	five players 1	Goals	Crevier 3	Taipei Songshan Sports Center Swimming Pool; Referees: Andreas Moiralis (GRE); Radu-Sorin Matache (ROU)

24 August 2017; 10:20	Report	New Zealand	9–9	Great Britain	Taipei Songshan Sports Center Swimming Pool; Referees: Adam Richardson (AUS); Amber Drury (USA)
24 August 2017; 10:20	Report	Score by quarters: 3–3, 0–3, 3–2, 3–1			Taipei Songshan Sports Center Swimming Pool; Referees: Adam Richardson (AUS); Amber Drury (USA)
24 August 2017; 10:20	Report	Lopes da Silva, Carevic 3	Goals	Hesketh 3	Taipei Songshan Sports Center Swimming Pool; Referees: Adam Richardson (AUS); Amber Drury (USA)

24 August 2017; 11:40	Report	Canada	11–12	Japan	Taipei Songshan Sports Center Swimming Pool; Referees: Stephen O'Brien (IRL); Erwin Schapers (NED)
24 August 2017; 11:40	Report	Score by quarters: 2–4, 3–2, 4–2, 2–4			Taipei Songshan Sports Center Swimming Pool; Referees: Stephen O'Brien (IRL); Erwin Schapers (NED)
24 August 2017; 11:40	Report	Lemay-Lavoie 5	Goals	Arima 5	Taipei Songshan Sports Center Swimming Pool; Referees: Stephen O'Brien (IRL); Erwin Schapers (NED)

24 August 2017; 13:00	Report	Russia	12–11	Hungary	Taipei Songshan Sports Center Swimming Pool; Referees: Marco Ercoli (ITA); Jaume Teixido (ESP)
24 August 2017; 13:00	Report	Score by quarters: 4–5, 4–1, 1–3, 3–2			Taipei Songshan Sports Center Swimming Pool; Referees: Marco Ercoli (ITA); Jaume Teixido (ESP)
24 August 2017; 13:00	Report	Simanovich 3	Goals	Szilágyi 4	Taipei Songshan Sports Center Swimming Pool; Referees: Marco Ercoli (ITA); Jaume Teixido (ESP)

25 August 2017; 10:20	Report	Hungary	15–6	New Zealand	Taipei Songshan Sports Center Swimming Pool; Referees: Stephen O'Brien (IRL); Erwin Schapers (NED)
25 August 2017; 10:20	Report	Score by quarters: 6–2, 2–0, 4–2, 3–2			Taipei Songshan Sports Center Swimming Pool; Referees: Stephen O'Brien (IRL); Erwin Schapers (NED)
25 August 2017; 10:20	Report	Szilágyi 6	Goals	Tobin 3	Taipei Songshan Sports Center Swimming Pool; Referees: Stephen O'Brien (IRL); Erwin Schapers (NED)

25 August 2017; 11:40	Report	Japan	14–18	Russia	Taipei Songshan Sports Center Swimming Pool; Referees: Pascal Bouchez (FRA); Amber Drury (USA)
25 August 2017; 11:40	Report	Score by quarters: 4–5, 3–5, 2–5, 5–3			Taipei Songshan Sports Center Swimming Pool; Referees: Pascal Bouchez (FRA); Amber Drury (USA)
25 August 2017; 11:40	Report	Arima 6	Goals	Trotskaya 5	Taipei Songshan Sports Center Swimming Pool; Referees: Pascal Bouchez (FRA); Amber Drury (USA)

25 August 2017; 13:00	Report	Canada	24–5	Great Britain	Taipei Songshan Sports Center Swimming Pool; Referees: Andrew Carney (AUS); Ursula Wengenroth (SUI)
25 August 2017; 13:00	Report	Score by quarters: 5–1, 4–3, 6–1, 9–0			Taipei Songshan Sports Center Swimming Pool; Referees: Andrew Carney (AUS); Ursula Wengenroth (SUI)
25 August 2017; 13:00	Report	Lemay-Lavoie 5	Goals	Hesketh 3	Taipei Songshan Sports Center Swimming Pool; Referees: Andrew Carney (AUS); Ursula Wengenroth (SUI)

==== Group B ====
Team	Pld	W	D	L	GF	GA	GD	Pts
United States	5	5	0	0	95	14	+81	10
Italy	5	4	0	1	53	34	+19	8
France	5	3	0	2	43	38	+5	6
Australia	5	2	0	3	47	37	+10	4
Greece	5	1	0	4	22	62	−40	2
Argentina	5	0	0	5	15	80	−65	0

19 August 2017; 09:00	Report	Australia	10–3	Greece	Taipei Songshan Sports Center Swimming Pool; Referees: Balazs Szekely (HUN); Irfan Sadekov (RUS)
19 August 2017; 09:00	Report	Score by quarters: 2–1, 3–0, 4–1, 1–1			Taipei Songshan Sports Center Swimming Pool; Referees: Balazs Szekely (HUN); Irfan Sadekov (RUS)
19 August 2017; 09:00	Report	Williams 4	Goals	Kontogianni 2	Taipei Songshan Sports Center Swimming Pool; Referees: Balazs Szekely (HUN); Irfan Sadekov (RUS)

19 August 2017; 10:20	Report	United States	15–4	France	Taipei Songshan Sports Center Swimming Pool; Referees: Maxim Gerasimov (GBR); Attila Marosvari (HUN)
19 August 2017; 10:20	Report	Score by quarters: 5–1, 2–1, 4–1, 4–1			Taipei Songshan Sports Center Swimming Pool; Referees: Maxim Gerasimov (GBR); Attila Marosvari (HUN)
19 August 2017; 10:20	Report	Berggren 4	Goals	four players 1	Taipei Songshan Sports Center Swimming Pool; Referees: Maxim Gerasimov (GBR); Attila Marosvari (HUN)

19 August 2017; 11:40	Report	Italy	20–4	Argentina	Taipei Songshan Sports Center Swimming Pool; Referees: Jean-Francois Morisseau (CAN); Chang Wan-yu (TPE)
19 August 2017; 11:40	Report	Score by quarters: 4–1, 5–0, 8–1, 3–2			Taipei Songshan Sports Center Swimming Pool; Referees: Jean-Francois Morisseau (CAN); Chang Wan-yu (TPE)
19 August 2017; 11:40	Report	Damico 4	Goals	four players 1	Taipei Songshan Sports Center Swimming Pool; Referees: Jean-Francois Morisseau (CAN); Chang Wan-yu (TPE)

20 August 2017; 14:20	Report	Greece	5–15	France	Taipei Songshan Sports Center Swimming Pool; Referees: Radu-Sorin Matache (ROU); Stephen O'Brien (IRL)
20 August 2017; 14:20	Report	Score by quarters: 0–4, 1–3, 3–3, 1–5			Taipei Songshan Sports Center Swimming Pool; Referees: Radu-Sorin Matache (ROU); Stephen O'Brien (IRL)
20 August 2017; 14:20	Report	Kontogianni 4	Goals	Daule 5	Taipei Songshan Sports Center Swimming Pool; Referees: Radu-Sorin Matache (ROU); Stephen O'Brien (IRL)

20 August 2017; 15:40	Report	Argentina	1–19	United States	Taipei Songshan Sports Center Swimming Pool; Referees: Irfan Sadekov (RUS); Marie Deslieres (CAN)
20 August 2017; 15:40	Report	Score by quarters: 0–7, 1–4, 0–1			Taipei Songshan Sports Center Swimming Pool; Referees: Irfan Sadekov (RUS); Marie Deslieres (CAN)
20 August 2017; 15:40	Report	Comba 1	Goals	Raney 4	Taipei Songshan Sports Center Swimming Pool; Referees: Irfan Sadekov (RUS); Marie Deslieres (CAN)

20 August 2017; 17:00	Report	Australia	6–8	Italy	Taipei Songshan Sports Center Swimming Pool; Referees: Ursula Wengenroth (SUI); Vladimir Gerzanich (RUS)
20 August 2017; 17:00	Report	Score by quarters: 2–3, 1–2, 3–1, 0–2			Taipei Songshan Sports Center Swimming Pool; Referees: Ursula Wengenroth (SUI); Vladimir Gerzanich (RUS)
20 August 2017; 17:00	Report	Carter 3	Goals	Morvillo 2	Taipei Songshan Sports Center Swimming Pool; Referees: Ursula Wengenroth (SUI); Vladimir Gerzanich (RUS)

22 August 2017; 14:20	Report	France	11–4	Argentina	Taipei Songshan Sports Center Swimming Pool; Referees: Vladimir Gerzanich (RUS); David Couper (NZL)
22 August 2017; 14:20	Report	Score by quarters: 2–0, 5–0, 2–2, 2–2			Taipei Songshan Sports Center Swimming Pool; Referees: Vladimir Gerzanich (RUS); David Couper (NZL)
22 August 2017; 14:20	Report	four players 2	Goals	Comba 3	Taipei Songshan Sports Center Swimming Pool; Referees: Vladimir Gerzanich (RUS); David Couper (NZL)

22 August 2017; 15:40	Report	Italy	14–3	Greece	Taipei Songshan Sports Center Swimming Pool; Referees: Erwin Schapers (NED); Igor Virijevic (SRB)
22 August 2017; 15:40	Report	Score by quarters: 6–2, 4–0, 2–1, 2–0			Taipei Songshan Sports Center Swimming Pool; Referees: Erwin Schapers (NED); Igor Virijevic (SRB)
22 August 2017; 15:40	Report	five players 2	Goals	Kontogianni 2	Taipei Songshan Sports Center Swimming Pool; Referees: Erwin Schapers (NED); Igor Virijevic (SRB)

22 August 2017; 17:00	Report	United States	17–3	Australia	Taipei Songshan Sports Center Swimming Pool; Referees: Irfan Sadekov (RUS); Damien Taylor (GBR)
22 August 2017; 17:00	Report	Score by quarters: 4–1, 5–1, 3–0, 5–1			Taipei Songshan Sports Center Swimming Pool; Referees: Irfan Sadekov (RUS); Damien Taylor (GBR)
22 August 2017; 17:00	Report	Klass 3	Goals	three players 1	Taipei Songshan Sports Center Swimming Pool; Referees: Irfan Sadekov (RUS); Damien Taylor (GBR)

24 August 2017; 14:20	Report	Greece	8–5	Argentina	Taipei Songshan Sports Center Swimming Pool; Referees: Damien Taylor (GBR); Vladimir Gerzanich (RUS)
24 August 2017; 14:20	Report	Score by quarters: 2–2, 2–0, 2–2, 2–1			Taipei Songshan Sports Center Swimming Pool; Referees: Damien Taylor (GBR); Vladimir Gerzanich (RUS)
24 August 2017; 14:20	Report	Mamoglou, Kontogianni 3	Goals	Comba 2	Taipei Songshan Sports Center Swimming Pool; Referees: Damien Taylor (GBR); Vladimir Gerzanich (RUS)

24 August 2017; 15:40	Report	Australia	6–8	France	Taipei Songshan Sports Center Swimming Pool; Referees: Marie Deslieres (CAN); Ursula Wengenroth (SUI)
24 August 2017; 15:40	Report	Score by quarters: 2–1, 0–2, 2–4, 2–1			Taipei Songshan Sports Center Swimming Pool; Referees: Marie Deslieres (CAN); Ursula Wengenroth (SUI)
24 August 2017; 15:40	Report	Casey 3	Goals	Millot 3	Taipei Songshan Sports Center Swimming Pool; Referees: Marie Deslieres (CAN); Ursula Wengenroth (SUI)

24 August 2017; 17:00	Report	Italy	3–16	United States	Taipei Songshan Sports Center Swimming Pool; Referees: Radu-Sorin Matache (ROU); Attila Marosvari (HUN)
24 August 2017; 17:00	Report	Score by quarters: 0–4, 0–3, 2–6, 1–3			Taipei Songshan Sports Center Swimming Pool; Referees: Radu-Sorin Matache (ROU); Attila Marosvari (HUN)
24 August 2017; 17:00	Report	three players 1	Goals	Neushul 4	Taipei Songshan Sports Center Swimming Pool; Referees: Radu-Sorin Matache (ROU); Attila Marosvari (HUN)

25 August 2017; 14:20	Report	United States	18–3	Greece	Taipei Songshan Sports Center Swimming Pool; Referees: Vladimir Gerzanich (RUS); Jang Shi-young (KOR)
25 August 2017; 14:20	Report	Score by quarters: 4–0, 5–0, 4–1, 5–2			Taipei Songshan Sports Center Swimming Pool; Referees: Vladimir Gerzanich (RUS); Jang Shi-young (KOR)
25 August 2017; 14:20	Report	three players 3	Goals	three players 1	Taipei Songshan Sports Center Swimming Pool; Referees: Vladimir Gerzanich (RUS); Jang Shi-young (KOR)

25 August 2017; 15:40	Report	France	5–8	Italy	Taipei Songshan Sports Center Swimming Pool; Referees: Marie Deslieres (CAN); Attila Marosvari (HUN)
25 August 2017; 15:40	Report	Score by quarters: 1–2, 1–1, 2–2, 1–3			Taipei Songshan Sports Center Swimming Pool; Referees: Marie Deslieres (CAN); Attila Marosvari (HUN)
25 August 2017; 15:40	Report	Millot, Valverde 2	Goals	Galardi 4	Taipei Songshan Sports Center Swimming Pool; Referees: Marie Deslieres (CAN); Attila Marosvari (HUN)

25 August 2017; 17:00	Report	Australia	22–1	Argentina	Taipei Songshan Sports Center Swimming Pool; Referees: Maxim Gerasimov (GBR); Balazs Szekely (HUN)
25 August 2017; 17:00	Report	Score by quarters: 5–0, 5–0, 8–0, 4–1			Taipei Songshan Sports Center Swimming Pool; Referees: Maxim Gerasimov (GBR); Balazs Szekely (HUN)
25 August 2017; 17:00	Report	Hille 5	Goals	Comba 1	Taipei Songshan Sports Center Swimming Pool; Referees: Maxim Gerasimov (GBR); Balazs Szekely (HUN)

== Final round ==
=== 9th-12th places ===
9th-12th semifinals
26 August 2017 10:30
New Zealand	6
Greece	7
26 August 2017 12:00
Great Britain	7
Argentina	4

9th place match
28 August 2017 12:00
Greece	11 (4)
Great Britain	10 (3)
11th place match
28 August 2017 10:30
New Zealand	17
Argentina	2

26 August 2017; 10:30	Report	New Zealand	6–7	Greece	Taipei Songshan Sports Center Swimming Pool; Referees: Pascal Bouchez (FRA); Maxim Gerasimov (GBR)
26 August 2017; 10:30	Report	Score by quarters: 2–0, 1–1, 1–3, 2–3			Taipei Songshan Sports Center Swimming Pool; Referees: Pascal Bouchez (FRA); Maxim Gerasimov (GBR)
26 August 2017; 10:30	Report	Ferigo, Lopes Da Silva 2	Goals	Kontogianni 3	Taipei Songshan Sports Center Swimming Pool; Referees: Pascal Bouchez (FRA); Maxim Gerasimov (GBR)

26 August 2017; 12:00	Report	Great Britain	7–4	Argentina	Taipei Songshan Sports Center Swimming Pool; Referees: Stephen O'Brien (IRL); Michael Baty (RSA)
26 August 2017; 12:00	Report	Score by quarters: 2–0, 3–2, 1–2, 1–1			Taipei Songshan Sports Center Swimming Pool; Referees: Stephen O'Brien (IRL); Michael Baty (RSA)
26 August 2017; 12:00	Report	Hesketh 3	Goals	Comba 2	Taipei Songshan Sports Center Swimming Pool; Referees: Stephen O'Brien (IRL); Michael Baty (RSA)

=== Final eight ===
Quarterfinals
26 August 2017 13:30
Russia	13
Australia	6
26 August 2017 15:00
Hungary	7
France	4
26 August 2017 16:30
Japan	17
Italy	15
26 August 2017 18:00
Canada	7
United States	13

Semifinals
27 August 2017 16:30
Russia	7
Hungary	11
27 August 2017 18:00
Japan	8
United States	13

Final
29 August 2017 19:30
Hungary	9
United States	16
3rd place match
29 August 2017 18:00
Russia	11
Japan	12

5th-8th semifinals
28 August 2017 13:30
Australia	6
France	5
28 August 2017 15:00
Italy	13
Canada	16

5th place match
29 August 2017 15:00
Australia	8
Canada	16
7th place match
29 August 2017 16:30
France	11
Italy	6

==== Quarterfinals ====
26 August 2017; 13:30	Report	Russia	13–6	Australia	Taipei Songshan Sports Center Swimming Pool; Referees: Attila Marosvari (HUN); Keiichi Orikasa (JPN)
26 August 2017; 13:30	Report	Score by quarters: 4–1, 3–2, 4–2, 2–1			Taipei Songshan Sports Center Swimming Pool; Referees: Attila Marosvari (HUN); Keiichi Orikasa (JPN)
26 August 2017; 13:30	Report	three players 3	Goals	Carter 3	Taipei Songshan Sports Center Swimming Pool; Referees: Attila Marosvari (HUN); Keiichi Orikasa (JPN)

26 August 2017; 15:00	Report	Hungary	7–4	France	Taipei Songshan Sports Center Swimming Pool; Referees: Erwin Schapers (NED); Humberto Navarro (USA)
26 August 2017; 15:00	Report	Score by quarters: 3–1, 0–2, 0–1, 4–0			Taipei Songshan Sports Center Swimming Pool; Referees: Erwin Schapers (NED); Humberto Navarro (USA)
26 August 2017; 15:00	Report	Szilágyi 3	Goals	four players 1	Taipei Songshan Sports Center Swimming Pool; Referees: Erwin Schapers (NED); Humberto Navarro (USA)

26 August 2017; 16:30	Report	Japan	17–15 (PSO)	Italy	Taipei Songshan Sports Center Swimming Pool; Referees: Andrew Carney(AUS); Marie Deslieres (CAN)
26 August 2017; 16:30	Report	Score by quarters: 4–2, 2–4, 3–4, 3–2 PSO: 5–3			Taipei Songshan Sports Center Swimming Pool; Referees: Andrew Carney(AUS); Marie Deslieres (CAN)
26 August 2017; 16:30	Report	Suzuki, Arima 3	Goals	Galardi 4	Taipei Songshan Sports Center Swimming Pool; Referees: Andrew Carney(AUS); Marie Deslieres (CAN)

26 August 2017; 18:00	Report	Canada	7–13	United States	Taipei Songshan Sports Center Swimming Pool; Referees: Jaume Teixido (ESP); Balazs Szekely (HUN)
26 August 2017; 18:00	Report	Score by quarters: 1–4, 1–3, 3–3, 2–3			Taipei Songshan Sports Center Swimming Pool; Referees: Jaume Teixido (ESP); Balazs Szekely (HUN)
26 August 2017; 18:00	Report	Lemay-Lavoie 3	Goals	six players 2	Taipei Songshan Sports Center Swimming Pool; Referees: Jaume Teixido (ESP); Balazs Szekely (HUN)

==== Semifinals ====
27 August 2017; 16:30	Report	Russia	7–11	Hungary	National Taiwan Sport University Arena; Referees: Marie Deslieres (CAN); Jaume Teixido (ESP)
27 August 2017; 16:30	Report	Score by quarters: 0–4, 3–3, 3–3, 1–1			National Taiwan Sport University Arena; Referees: Marie Deslieres (CAN); Jaume Teixido (ESP)
27 August 2017; 16:30	Report	Karimova, Gorbunova 2	Goals	Gurisatti, Szilágyi 3	National Taiwan Sport University Arena; Referees: Marie Deslieres (CAN); Jaume Teixido (ESP)

27 August 2017; 18:00	Report	Japan	8–13	United States	National Taiwan Sport University Arena; Referees: Pascal Bouchez (FRA); Ursula Wengenroth (SUI)
27 August 2017; 18:00	Report	Score by quarters: 2–4, 1–4, 2–2, 3–3			National Taiwan Sport University Arena; Referees: Pascal Bouchez (FRA); Ursula Wengenroth (SUI)
27 August 2017; 18:00	Report	Arima 3	Goals	Neushul 5	National Taiwan Sport University Arena; Referees: Pascal Bouchez (FRA); Ursula Wengenroth (SUI)

==== 5th-8th semifinals ====
28 August 2017; 13:30	Report	Australia	6–5	France	National Taiwan Sport University Arena; Referees: Stephen O'Brien (IRL); Leonadro Ceccarelli (ITA)
28 August 2017; 13:30	Report	Score by quarters: 0–4, 1–0, 2–1, 3–0			National Taiwan Sport University Arena; Referees: Stephen O'Brien (IRL); Leonadro Ceccarelli (ITA)
28 August 2017; 13:30	Report	Morrissey 5	Goals	five players 1	National Taiwan Sport University Arena; Referees: Stephen O'Brien (IRL); Leonadro Ceccarelli (ITA)

28 August 2017; 15:00	Report	Italy	13–16	Canada	National Taiwan Sport University Arena; Referees: Attila Marosvari (HUN); Amber Drury (USA)
28 August 2017; 15:00	Report	Score by quarters: 4–5, 2–5, 3–3, 4–3			National Taiwan Sport University Arena; Referees: Attila Marosvari (HUN); Amber Drury (USA)
28 August 2017; 15:00	Report	D'Amico, Millo 3	Goals	Lemay-Lavoie 5	National Taiwan Sport University Arena; Referees: Attila Marosvari (HUN); Amber Drury (USA)

== Ranking matches ==
=== 11th place match ===
28 August 2017; 10:30	Report	New Zealand	17–2	Argentina	National Taiwan Sport University Arena; Referees: Michael Baty (RSA); Damien Taylor (GBR)
28 August 2017; 10:30	Report	Score by quarters: 2–0, 5–0, 6–2, 4–0			National Taiwan Sport University Arena; Referees: Michael Baty (RSA); Damien Taylor (GBR)
28 August 2017; 10:30	Report	Tobin 3	Goals	Todoroff, Gerschcovsky 1	National Taiwan Sport University Arena; Referees: Michael Baty (RSA); Damien Taylor (GBR)

=== 9th place match ===
28 August 2017; 12:00	Report	Greece	11–10 (PSO)	Great Britain	National Taiwan Sport University Arena; Referees: Sebastien Dervieux (FRA); Irfan Sadekov (RUS)
28 August 2017; 12:00	Report	Score by quarters: 2–0, 3–4, 1–2, 1–1 PSO: 4–3			National Taiwan Sport University Arena; Referees: Sebastien Dervieux (FRA); Irfan Sadekov (RUS)
28 August 2017; 12:00	Report	three players 2	Goals	Bartlett 2	National Taiwan Sport University Arena; Referees: Sebastien Dervieux (FRA); Irfan Sadekov (RUS)

=== 7th place match ===
29 August 2017; 15:00	Report	France	11–6	Italy	National Taiwan Sport University Arena; Referees: Andrew Carney (AUS); Balázs Székely (HUN)
29 August 2017; 15:00	Report	Score by quarters: 3–0, 2–1, 4–2, 2–3			National Taiwan Sport University Arena; Referees: Andrew Carney (AUS); Balázs Székely (HUN)
29 August 2017; 15:00	Report	Daule 4	Goals	Viacava 2	National Taiwan Sport University Arena; Referees: Andrew Carney (AUS); Balázs Székely (HUN)

=== 5th place match ===
29 August 2017; 16:30	Report	Australia	8–16	Canada	National Taiwan Sport University Arena; Referees: Amber Drury (USA); Vladimir Gerzanich (RUS)
29 August 2017; 16:30	Report	Score by quarters: 1–5, 3–4, 1–4, 3–3			National Taiwan Sport University Arena; Referees: Amber Drury (USA); Vladimir Gerzanich (RUS)
29 August 2017; 16:30	Report	Morrissey 3	Goals	Lemay-Lavoie 3	National Taiwan Sport University Arena; Referees: Amber Drury (USA); Vladimir Gerzanich (RUS)

=== Bronze medal match ===
29 August 2017; 18:00	Report	Russia	11–12	Japan	National Taiwan Sport University Arena; Referees: Ursula Wengenroth (SUI); Erwin Schapers (NED)
29 August 2017; 18:00	Report	Score by quarters: 2–2, 2–5, 5–2, 2–4			National Taiwan Sport University Arena; Referees: Ursula Wengenroth (SUI); Erwin Schapers (NED)
29 August 2017; 18:00	Report	Gorbunova 4	Goals	Arima, Suzuki 3	National Taiwan Sport University Arena; Referees: Ursula Wengenroth (SUI); Erwin Schapers (NED)

=== Gold medal match ===
29 August 2017; 19:30	Report	Hungary	9–16	United States	National Taiwan Sport University Arena; Referees: Marie Deslieres (CAN); Andreas Moiralis (GRE)
29 August 2017; 19:30	Report	Score by quarters: 2–5, 1–5, 3–3, 3–3			National Taiwan Sport University Arena; Referees: Marie Deslieres (CAN); Andreas Moiralis (GRE)
29 August 2017; 19:30	Report	Parkes 3	Goals	K. Neushul, J. Neushul 4	National Taiwan Sport University Arena; Referees: Marie Deslieres (CAN); Andreas Moiralis (GRE)

== Final standing ==
Rank	Team
1st place, gold medalist(s)	United States
2nd place, silver medalist(s)	Hungary
3rd place, bronze medalist(s)	Japan
4	Russia
5	Canada
6	Australia
7	France
8	Italy
9	Greece
10	Great Britain
11	New Zealand
12	Argentina
