= Minori Yamamoto =

Minori Yamamoto may refer to:

- Minori Yamamoto (water polo)
- Minori Yamamoto (rugby union)
