= Brigitta Games =

American water polo player (born 1995)

Personal information
- Born: February 9, 1995 (age 31) Los Angeles, California, U.S.
- Height: 6 ft (1.8 m)
- Weight: 245 lb (111 kg)

Sport
- Sport: Water polo
- Position: Centre forward
- College team: Golden West College; University of Southern California
- Current club: CN Mataró
Medal record
Women's water polo
Representing the United States
Summer Universiade
Gold medal – first place	2017 Taipei	Team
FINA World League
Gold medal – first place	2017 Shanghai	Team
Gold medal – first place	2018 Kunshan	Team

Brigitta Games (born February 9, 1995) was an American water polo player who competed for the University of Southern California. As a USC Junior, Games helped lead the team to the NCAA Championship in water polo in 2015 defeating Stanford, and scoring a total of seven goals in the tournament.

== Early life ==
Games was born February 9, 1995 in Long Beach, California to Silvia and Gregory Games. By the age of five she swam and trained with the Brea Aquatics team, competing in the 25-meter butterfly finishing fourth, and the 25-meter freestyle finishing fifth at the Orange County Swimming Championships in August, 2000. She attended Chatfield High School in Littleton, Colorado, where she competed in swimming and threw the shotput and discus in track and field. She specialized in freestyle and individual medley in swimming often competing in the 200-yard freestyle event. During her High School years, she played water polo for the Rocky Mountain Neptunes, and the Colorado Water Polo Club teams. Strong in academics during her High School years, Games was twice an Academic All-American for USA Water Polo. As a swimmer, she received second team all conference honors in 2010 and on two occasions was the recipient of honorable mention all-conference honors. In high school track, in 2012, she also received honors as All-conference honorable mention.

== College career ==
Games swam and played water polo for one season at Golden West College where she was part of the team that won the 2013 State Water Polo Championship, and was voted a most Valuable Swimmer. She then transferred to University of Southern California, playing on the women's water polo team from 2015 to 2017 and winning the NCAA in 2016 after defeating Stanford.

In her first season with USC in 2015, she scored 27 goals including five goals at the NCAA championship. That year, she earned honorable mention All-American honors.

As a Junior player in the 2015-2016 season, she was the water polo teams' high scorer with 43 goals, scoring seven goals in the NCAA championship while helping lead the team to the national title. She received first team All-American honors, and was the recipient of the Mountain Pacific Sports Federation's Second team honors.

As a USC Senior in the 2017 NCAA water polo semi-final match against strong rival Stanford, in second quarter play, Games broke two ribs making her unable to assist the team in the remainder of the match. According to Games's coach Jovan Vavic, the incident intensified the existing rivalry between Stanford and USC.

== International career ==
Games competed on both the junior and senior national teams for the U.S. national team winning the gold medal at the 2017 and 2018 FINA World League championships.
