= 2018 FINA Women's Water Polo World League =

- League: FINA Water Polo World League
- Sport: Water Polo
- Duration: 21 November 2017 to 2 June 2018

Super Final
- Finals champions: United States (12th title)
- Runners-up: Netherlands
- Finals MVP: (Netherlands) Sabrina van der Sloot

FINA Women's Water Polo World League seasons
- ← 2017 2019 →

The 2018 FINA Women's Water Polo World League was the 15th edition of the annual women's international water polo tournament. It was played between November 2017 and June 2018 and open to all women's water polo national teams. After participating in a preliminary round, eight teams qualified to play in a final tournament, called the Super Final from 28 May to 2 June 2018.

In the world league, there are specific rules that do not allow matches to end in a draw. If teams are level at the end of the 4th quarter of any world league match, the match will be decided by a penalty shootout. Teams earn points in the standings in group matches as follows:

- Match won in normal time - 3 points
- Match won in shootout - 2 points
- Match lost in shootout - 1 point
- Match lost in normal time - 0 points

== Europe ==
- November 21, 2017 – May 1, 2018

Pos	Team	Pld	W	OTW	OTL	L	GF	GA	GD	Pts	Qualification	Spain	Russia	Netherlands	Hungary
1	Spain	6	3	1	0	2	60	56	+4	11	Super Final	—	9–8	10–11	12–12 (3–1)
2	Russia	6	3	0	0	3	59	59	0	9	Super Final	7–9	—	9–6	13–11
3	Netherlands	6	3	0	0	3	54	54	0	9	Super Final	8–11	12–13	—	7–6
4	Hungary	6	2	0	1	3	56	60	−4	7		10–9	12–9	5–10	—

Source: FINA
Rules for classification: Only goals scored in regular time are counted.

== Inter-Continental Cup ==
- April 3–8, 2018, Auckland, New Zealand

=== Group A ===
Pos	Team	Pld	W	OTW	OTL	L	GF	GA	GD	Pts	Qualification	Canada	People's Republic of China	Japan	New Zealand
1	Canada	3	3	0	0	0	41	28	+13	9	Super Final	—		15–13	
2	China	3	2	0	0	1	31	23	+8	6	Quarterfinals	10–11	—	11–7	10–5
3	Japan	3	1	0	0	2	29	33	−4	3	Quarterfinals			—	
4	New Zealand (H)	3	0	0	0	3	17	34	−17	0	Quarterfinals	5–15		7–9	—

Source: FINA
Rules for classification: Only goals scored in regular time are counted.
(H) Host

=== Group B ===
Pos	Team	Pld	W	OTW	OTL	L	GF	GA	GD	Pts	Qualification	Australia	United States	Kazakhstan	New Zealand
1	Australia	2	2	0	0	0	19	11	+8	6	Quarterfinals	—			
2	United States	2	1	0	0	1	21	15	+6	3	Quarterfinals	8–9	—	13–6	
3	Kazakhstan	2	0	0	0	2	9	23	−14	0	Quarterfinals	3–10		—	
4	New Zealand 2 (Note: New Zealand was represented by 2nd team)	0	0	0	0	0	0	0	0	0 (Note: Matches of New Zealand 2 are not counted in the competition)		2–20	2–24	5–19	—

Source: FINA
Rules for classification: Only goals scored in regular time are counted.
Notes:

5th–8th place bracket

5th–8th place classification
7 April
Kazakhstan (pen.)	14 (4)
New Zealand	14 (3)
7 April
Japan	(Note: Japan 24–3 New Zealand 2 (Match is not counted in the competition))
New Zealand 2

5th place match
8 April
Kazakhstan	9
Japan	11
7th place match
8 April
New Zealand	(Note: New Zealand 12–1 New Zealand 2 (Match is not counted in the competition))
New Zealand 2

Championship bracket

Quarterfinals
6 April
China	9
Kazakhstan	6
6 April
New Zealand	4
Australia	15
6 April
Japan	9
United States	16
6 April
Canada	(Note: Canada 18–4 New Zealand 2 (Match is not counted in the competition))
New Zealand 2

Semifinals
7 April
China	7
Australia	8
7 April
United States	16
Canada	11

Gold medal match
8 April
Australia	7
United States	10
Bronze medal match
8 April
China	8
Canada	9

=== Final ranking ===
Qualified to Super Final

Rank	Team
Gold medal	United States
Silver medal	Australia
Bronze medal	Canada
4	China
5	Japan
6	Kazakhstan
7	New Zealand

== Super Final ==
May 28 – June 2, 2018, Kunshan, China
In the Super Final the eight qualifying teams are split into two groups of four teams with all teams progressing to the knock-out stage.

=== Qualified teams ===
Africa	Americas	Asia	Europe	Oceania
—	Canada; United States	China (Host); Japan	Netherlands; Russia; Spain	Australia

=== Seeding ===
Group A	Group B
Australia (2nd ICC); Spain (1st Europe); China (4th ICC) (Host); Netherlands (3rd Europe)	United States (1st ICC); Russia (2nd Europe); Canada (3rd ICC); Japan (5th ICC)

=== Preliminary round ===
==== Group A ====
All times are CST (UTC+8)

Pos	Team	Pld	W	OTW	OTL	L	GF	GA	GD	Pts	Qualification
1	Netherlands	3	3	0	0	0	24	18	+6	9	Quarterfinals
2	Spain	3	2	0	0	1	29	22	+7	6	Quarterfinals
3	China (H)	3	1	0	0	2	21	29	−8	3	Quarterfinals
4	Australia	3	0	0	0	3	20	25	−5	0	Quarterfinals

Source: FINA
Rules for classification: Only goals scored in regular time are counted.
(H) Host

28 May 2018; 18:00	Australia	5–7	Netherlands	Kunshan, China
28 May 2018; 18:00	Score by quarters: 1–2, 1–1, 1–3, 2–1			Kunshan, China

28 May 2018; 20:00	Spain	13–6	China	Kunshan, China
28 May 2018; 20:00	Score by quarters: 2–2, 5–0, 4–1, 2–3			Kunshan, China

29 May 2018; 16:30	Spain	6–7	Netherlands	Kunshan, China
29 May 2018; 16:30	Score by quarters: 0–2, 2–1, 3–2, 1–2			Kunshan, China

29 May 2018; 19:30	Australia	6–8	China	Kunshan, China
29 May 2018; 19:30	Score by quarters: 2–3, 2–2, 1–1, 1–2			Kunshan, China

30 May 2018; 16:30	Spain	10–9	Australia	Kunshan, China
30 May 2018; 16:30	Score by quarters: 3–4, 2–3, 3–2, 2–0			Kunshan, China

30 May 2018; 19:30	China	7–10	Netherlands	Kunshan, China
30 May 2018; 19:30	Score by quarters: 2–2, 2–5, 2–2, 1–1			Kunshan, China

==== Group B ====
All times are CST (UTC+8)

Pos	Team	Pld	W	OTW	OTL	L	GF	GA	GD	Pts	Qualification
1	United States	3	3	0	0	0	36	16	+20	9	Quarterfinals
2	Canada	3	2	0	0	1	29	25	+4	6	Quarterfinals
3	Russia	3	1	0	0	2	38	31	+7	3	Quarterfinals
4	Japan	3	0	0	0	3	18	49	−31	0	Quarterfinals

Source: FINA
Rules for classification: Only goals scored in regular time are counted.

28 May 2018; 15:00	Russia	9–11	Canada	Kunshan, China
28 May 2018; 15:00	Score by quarters: 3–4, 3–1, 3–5, 1–1			Kunshan, China

28 May 2018; 16:30	United States	14–4	Japan	Kunshan, China
28 May 2018; 16:30	Score by quarters: 1–1, 5–1, 6–2, 2–0			Kunshan, China

29 May 2018; 15:00	Russia	22–10	Japan	Kunshan, China
29 May 2018; 15:00	Score by quarters: 6–3, 4–2, 9–4, 3–1			Kunshan, China

29 May 2018; 18:00	United States	12–5	Canada	Kunshan, China
29 May 2018; 18:00	Score by quarters: 3–1, 2–2, 5–0, 2–2			Kunshan, China

30 May 2018; 15:00	Russia	7–10	United States	Kunshan, China
30 May 2018; 15:00	Score by quarters: 2–2, 0–2, 3–4, 2–2			Kunshan, China

30 May 2018; 18:00	Canada	13–4	Japan	Kunshan, China
30 May 2018; 18:00	Score by quarters: 5–0, 4–1, 2–2, 2–1			Kunshan, China

=== Final round ===
5th–8th place bracket

5th–8th place classification
1 June
Spain	11
Australia	8
1 June
China	8
Japan	7

5th place match
2 June
Spain	10
China	5
7th place match
2 June
Australia	10
Japan	7

==== 5th–8th place classification ====
All times are CST (UTC+8)

1 June 2018; 15:00	Spain	11–8	Australia	Kunshan, China
1 June 2018; 15:00	Score by quarters: 2–2, 5–1, 3–1, 1–4			Kunshan, China

1 June 2018; 16:30	China	8–7	Japan	Kunshan, China
1 June 2018; 16:30	Score by quarters: 2–2, 0–2, 4–3, 2–0			Kunshan, China

==== 7th place match ====
All times are CST (UTC+8)

2 June 2018; 15:00	Australia	10–7	Japan	Kunshan, China
2 June 2018; 15:00	Score by quarters: 1–1, 2–2, 3–2, 4–2			Kunshan, China

==== 5th place match ====
All times are CST (UTC+8)

2 June 2018; 16:30	Spain	10–5	China	Kunshan, China
2 June 2018; 16:30	Score by quarters: 2–1, 4–1, 2–2, 2–1			Kunshan, China

Championship bracket

Quarterfinals
31 May
Spain	11
Russia	12
31 May
Australia	1
United States	12
31 May
China	2
Canada	5
31 May
Netherlands	18
Japan	7

Semifinals
1 June
Russia	3
United States	8
1 June
Canada	5
Netherlands	11

Gold medal match
2 June
United States	8
Netherlands	6
Bronze medal match
2 June
Russia	7
Canada	6

==== Quarterfinals ====
All times are CST (UTC+8)

31 May 2018; 15:00	Spain	11–12 (PSO)	Russia	Kunshan, China
31 May 2018; 15:00	Score by quarters: 1–2, 3–3, 3–0, 1–3 PSO: 3–4			Kunshan, China

31 May 2018; 16:30	Netherlands	18–7	Japan	Kunshan, China
31 May 2018; 16:30	Score by quarters: 2–1, 6–1, 4–3, 6–2			Kunshan, China

31 May 2018; 18:00	Australia	1–12	United States	Kunshan, China
31 May 2018; 18:00	Score by quarters: 0–1, 0–2, 1–5, 0–4			Kunshan, China

31 May 2018; 19:30	China	2–5	Canada	Kunshan, China
31 May 2018; 19:30	Score by quarters: 1–1, 1–1, 0–2, 0–1			Kunshan, China

==== Semifinals ====
All times are CST (UTC+8)

1 June 2018; 18:00	Russia	3–8	United States	Kunshan, China
1 June 2018; 18:00	Score by quarters: 1–3, 0–3, 1–2, 1–0			Kunshan, China

1 June 2018; 19:30	Canada	5–11	Netherlands	Kunshan, China
1 June 2018; 19:30	Score by quarters: 2–3, 1–2, 1–4, 1–2			Kunshan, China

==== Bronze medal match ====
All times are CST (UTC+8)

2 June 2018; 18:00	(bronze) Russia	7–6	Canada	Kunshan, China
2 June 2018; 18:00	Score by quarters: 2–2, 2–2, 1–1, 2–1			Kunshan, China
2 June 2018; 18:00	Prokofyeva 3 four players 1	Goals	Wright 3 three players 1	Kunshan, China

==== Gold medal match ====
All times are CST (UTC+8)

2 June 2018; 19:30	(gold) United States	8–6	Netherlands (silver)	Kunshan, China
2 June 2018; 19:30	Score by quarters: 1–2, 2–0, 3–2, 2–2			Kunshan, China
2 June 2018; 19:30	Fattal 3 Seidemann 2 Hauschild, Steffens, Williams 1	Goals	van der Sloot 3 Genee, Megens, Sleeking 1	Kunshan, China

=== Final ranking ===
Rank	Team
Gold medal	United States
Silver medal	Netherlands
Bronze medal	Russia
4	Canada
5	Spain
6	China
7	Australia
8	Japan

2018 FINA Women's Water Polo World League

United States
12th title

Team Roster

Ashleigh Johnson, Brigitta Games, Melissa Seidemann, Rachel Fattal, Paige Hauschild, Maggie Steffens (C), Kaleigh Gilchrist, Kiley Neushul, Aria Fischer, Jamie Neushul, Stephania Haralabidis, Alys Williams, Gabby Stone. Head coach: Adam Krikorian.

=== Individual awards ===
- Most Valuable Player
  - Sabrina van der Sloot (NED)
- Best Goalkeeper
  - Ashleigh Johnson (USA)
- Top Scorer
  - Maud Megens (NED) — 15 goals
