= Water polo at the 2017 Summer Universiade =

Water polo at the XXIX Summer Universiade
- Venue: various
- Dates: August 18, 2017 – August 31, 2018
- Teams: 16 (men); 12 (women)

Water polo was contested at the 2017 Summer Universiade from August 18 to 31 in Taipei, Taiwan.

== Medal summary ==
=== Medal table ===
Rank	Nation	Gold	Silver	Bronze	Total
1	Serbia (SRB)	1	0	0	1
1	United States (USA)	1	0	0	1
3	Hungary (HUN)	0	1	0	1
3	Russia (RUS)	0	1	0	1
5	Italy (ITA)	0	0	1	1
5	Japan (JPN)	0	0	1	1
Totals (6 entries)		2	2	2	6

=== Medal events ===
Event	Gold	Silver	Bronze
Men	Serbia (SRB); Strajo Rističević; Strahinja Rašović; Viktor Rašović; Sava Ranđelović; Gavril Subotić; Nemanja Vico; Radomir Drašović; Đorđe Lazić; Nikola Jakšić; Filip Radojević; Dušan Vasić; Ognjen Stojanović; Lazar Dobožanov	Russia (RUS); Kirill Korneev; Nikolay Lazarev; Ivan Koptsev; Nikita Dereviankin; Ivan Suchkov; Konstantin Kharkov; Daniil Merkulov; Ivan Nagaev; Konstantin Sheikin; Dmitrii Kholod; Andrei Balakirev; Roman Shepelev; Vitaly Statsenko	Italy (ITA); Gianmarco Nicosia; Antonio Maccioni; Giacomo Cannella; Vincenzo Dolce; Edoardo Di Somma; Jacopo Alesiani; Eduardo Campopiano; Lorenzo Bruni; Giacomo Casasola; Edoardo Manzi; Roberto Ravina; Umberto Esposito; Stefano Morretti
Women	United States (USA); Gabrielle Stone; Mary Brooks; Danijela Jackovich; Madison Berggren; Stephanie Mutafyan; Katherine Klass; Jordan Raney; Kiley Neushul; Aria Fischer; Jamie Neushul; Brigitta Games; Alys Williams; Mia Rycraw	Hungary (HUN); Flóra Bolonyai; Rebecca Parkes; Katalin Menczinger; Gréta Gurisatti; Brigitta Horváth; Vivien Koevesdi; Dóra Leimeter; Krisztina Garda; Diana Ziegler; Fanny Vályi; Dorottya Szilágyi; Zsuzsanna Máté; Alexandra Kiss	Japan (JPN); Miyuu Aoki; Yumi Arima; Yuri Kazama; Aoi Saito; Chiaki Sakanoue; Minori Yamamoto; Akari Inaba; Yuki Niizawa; Kana Hosoya; Misaki Noro; Marina Tokumoto; Kotori Suzuki; Minami Shioya

== Men ==
16 teams participated in the men's tournament.

=== Teams ===
Pool A

- Chinese Taipei
- South Korea
- France
- Great Britain

Pool B

- Netherlands
- Italy
- Australia
- Argentina

Pool C

- Hungary
- Canada
- South Africa
- Serbia

Pool D

- United States
- Japan
- Russia
- Romania

== Women ==
12 teams participated in the women's tournament.

=== Teams ===
Pool A

- Canada
- New Zealand
- Hungary
- Japan
- Russia
- Great Britain

Pool B

- Australia
- Greece
- United States
- France
- Italy
- Argentina
