= Water polo at the 2015 World Aquatics Championships – Men's team rosters =

These are the rosters of all participating teams at the men's water polo tournament at the 2015 World Aquatics Championships in Kazan, Russia.

== Group A ==
=== Brazil ===
- Vinicius Antonelli
- Jonas Crivella
- Guilherme Gomes
- Ives González
- Paulo Salemi
- Bernardo Gomes
- Adrián Delgado
- Felipe Costa e Silva
- Bernardo Rocha
- Felipe Perrone
- Gustavo Guimarães
- Josip Vrlić
- ~~Thyê Bezerra~~

=== Canada ===
- Robin Randall
- Con Kudaba
- Oliver Vikalo
- Nicolas Constantin-Bicari
- Justin Boyd
- David Lapins
- Alec Taschereau
- Kevin Graham
- Matt Halajian
- John Conway
- George Torakis
- Jerry McElroy
- Dusan Aleksic

=== China ===
- Wu Honghui
- Tan Feihu
- Hu Zhangxin
- Dong Tao
- Lu Wenhui
- Li Li
- Chen Zhongxian
- Li Lun
- Xie Zekai
- Chen Jinghao
- Zhang Chufeng
- Liang Nianxiang
- Liang Zhiwei

=== Croatia ===
- Josip Pavić
- Damir Burić
- Antonio Petković
- Luka Lončar
- Maro Joković
- Luka Bukić
- Petar Muslim
- Andro Bušlje
- Sandro Sukno
- Fran Paškvalin
- Anđelo Šetka
- Paulo Obradović
- Marko Bijač

== Group B ==
=== Greece ===
- Konstantinos Flegkas
- Emmanouil Mylonakis
- Georgios Dervisis
- Konstantinos Genidounias
- Ioannis Fountoulis
- Kyriakos Pontikeas
- Christos Afroudakis
- Evangelos Delakas
- Konstantinos Mourikis
- Christodoulos Kolomvos
- Alexandros Gounas
- Angelos Vlachopoulos
- Stefanos Galanopoulos

=== Italy ===
- Stefano Tempesti
- Francesco Di Fulvio
- Alessandro Velotto
- Pietro Figlioli
- Alex Giorgetti
- Andrea Fondelli
- Massimo Giacoppo
- Nicholas Presciutti
- Niccolò Gitto
- Stefano Luongo
- Matteo Aicardi
- Fabio Baraldi
- Marco Del Lungo

=== Russia ===
- Anton Antonov
- Alexey Bugaychuk
- Artem Odintsov
- Igor Bychkov
- Albert Zinnatullin
- Artem Ashaev
- Vladislav Timakov
- Ivan Nagaev
- Konstantin Stepaniuk
- Dmitrii Kholod
- Sergey Lisunov
- Lev Magomaev
- Victor Ivanov

=== United States ===
- Merrill Moses
- Nikola Vavić
- Alex Obert
- Jackson Kimbell
- Alex Roelse
- Luca Cupido
- Josh Samuels
- Tony Azevedo
- Alex Bowen
- Bret Bonanni
- Jesse Smith
- John Mann
- McQuin Baron

== Group C ==
=== Argentina ===
- Diego Malnero
- Ramiro Veich
- Tomás Galimberti
- Andrés Monutti
- Emanuel López
- Tomás Bulgheroni
- Juan Pablo Montané
- Esteban Corsi
- Iván Carabantes
- Julián Daszczyk
- Franco Demarchi
- Germán Yañez
- Franco Testa

=== Hungary ===
- Viktor Nagy
- Miklós Gór-Nagy
- Norbert Madaras
- Balázs Erdélyi
- Márton Vámos
- Norbert Hosnyánszky
- Dániel Angyal
- Márton Szívós
- Dániel Varga
- Dénes Varga
- Krisztián Bedő
- Balázs Hárai
- Attila Decker

=== Kazakhstan ===
- Aleksandr Fyodorov
- Sergey Gubarev
- Alexandr Axenov
- Roman Pilipenko
- Vladimir Ushakov
- Alexey Shmider
- Murat Shakenov
- Anton Koliadenko
- Rustam Ukumanov
- Yevgeniy Medvedev
- Ravil Manafov
- Branko Pekovich
- Valeriy Shlemov

=== South Africa ===
- Dwayne Flatscher
- Etienne Le Roux
- Devon Card
- Ignardus Badenhorst
- Nicholas Hock
- Joao Marco de Carvalho
- Dayne Jagga
- Jared Wingate-Pearse
- Dean Whyte
- Pierre Le Roux
- Nicholas Molyneux
- Wesley Bohata
- Julian Lewis

== Group D ==
=== Australia ===
- James Stanton-French
- Richard Campbell
- George Ford
- John Cotterill
- Nathan Power
- Jarrod Gilchrist
- Aiden Roach
- Aaron Younger
- Joel Swift
- Mitchell Emery
- Rhys Howden
- Tyler Martin
- Joel Dennerley

=== Japan ===
- Katsuyuki Tanamura
- Seiya Adachi
- Atsushi Arai
- Mitsuaki Shiga
- Akira Yanase
- Atsuto Iida
- Yusuke Shimizu
- Yuki Kadono
- Koji Takei
- Kenya Yasuda
- Keigo Okawa
- Shota Hazui
- Tomoyoshi Fukushima

=== Montenegro ===
- Dejan Lazović
- Draško Brguljan
- Vjekoslav Pasković
- Uroš Čučković
- Darko Brguljan
- Aleksandar Radović
- Mlađan Janović
- Aleksa Ukropina
- Aleksandar Ivović
- Nikola Murišić
- Filip Klikovac
- Predrag Jokić
- Miloš Šćepanović

=== Serbia ===
- Gojko Pijetlović
- Dušan Mandić
- Živko Gocić
- Radomir Drašović
- Miloš Ćuk
- Duško Pijetlović
- Slobodan Nikić
- Milan Aleksić
- Nikola Jakšić
- Filip Filipović
- Andrija Prlainović
- Stefan Mitrović
- Branislav Mitrović

== See also ==
- Water polo at the 2015 World Aquatics Championships – Women's team rosters
