= Water polo at the 2019 Pan American Games – Women's tournament =

Women's water polo tournament at the 2019 Pan American Games
- Venue: Villa María del Triunfo Aquatic Centre
- Dates: 4–10 August
- Competitors: 88 from 8 nations

Medalists
Gold medal	United States
Silver medal	Canada
Bronze medal	Brazil

The women's tournament of water polo at the 2019 Pan American Games in Lima, Peru took place between 4 and 10 August at the Villa María del Triunfo Aquatic Centre. The winner of the competition qualifies directly for the 2020 Summer Olympics in Tokyo, Japan.

== Qualification ==
A total of eight teams qualified to compete in the tournament. The numbers in parentheses represents the number of participants qualified.

- Brazil (11)
- Canada (11)
- Cuba (11)
- Mexico (11)
- Peru (11)
- Puerto Rico (11)
- United States (11)
- Venezuela (11)

== Format ==
Teams are split into 2 round-robin groups of 4 teams each, where the final positions in each group will determine seedings for the knockout stage. The losing teams from the quarterfinals stage will compete in a separate single elimination bracket to determine fifth through eighth places in the final rankings.

== Preliminary round ==
=== Group A ===
Pos	Team	Pld	W	D	L	GF	GA	GD	Pts	Qualification
1	United States	3	3	0	0	66	10	+56	6	Quarterfinals
2	Brazil	3	2	0	1	31	32	−1	4	Quarterfinals
3	Puerto Rico	3	1	0	2	20	40	−20	2	Quarterfinals
4	Venezuela	3	0	0	3	12	47	−35	0	Quarterfinals

Source: Lima 2019
Rules for classification: 1) points; 2) head-to-head points; 3) head-to-head goal difference; 4) head-to-head number of goals scored; 5) goal difference.

4 August 2019; 8:00	Report	Brazil	15–4	Venezuela	Villa María del Triunfo Aquatic Centre, Lima; Referees: Juan Menéndez (CUB); Gerardo Arellano (MEX)
4 August 2019; 8:00	Report	Score by quarters: 2-1, 4-2, 5-0, 4-1			Villa María del Triunfo Aquatic Centre, Lima; Referees: Juan Menéndez (CUB); Gerardo Arellano (MEX)
4 August 2019; 8:00	Report	Bahia 6	Goals	Torres 3	Villa María del Triunfo Aquatic Centre, Lima; Referees: Juan Menéndez (CUB); Gerardo Arellano (MEX)

4 August 2019; 11:00	Report	Puerto Rico	3–23	United States	Villa María del Triunfo Aquatic Centre, Lima; Referees: Doriel Terpenka (CAN); Fernando Varela (PER)
4 August 2019; 11:00	Report	Score by quarters: 0-5, 0-6, 2-5, 1-7			Villa María del Triunfo Aquatic Centre, Lima; Referees: Doriel Terpenka (CAN); Fernando Varela (PER)
4 August 2019; 11:00	Report	three players 1	Goals	Haralabidis 6	Villa María del Triunfo Aquatic Centre, Lima; Referees: Doriel Terpenka (CAN); Fernando Varela (PER)

5 August 2019; 8:00	Report	Puerto Rico	9–5	Venezuela	Villa María del Triunfo Aquatic Centre, Lima; Referees: Marie-Claude Deslieres (CAN); Yasmany Lima (CUB)
5 August 2019; 8:00	Report	Score by quarters: 2-1, 2-1, 4-2, 1-1			Villa María del Triunfo Aquatic Centre, Lima; Referees: Marie-Claude Deslieres (CAN); Yasmany Lima (CUB)
5 August 2019; 8:00	Report	Maldonado 3	Goals	Martínez 3	Villa María del Triunfo Aquatic Centre, Lima; Referees: Marie-Claude Deslieres (CAN); Yasmany Lima (CUB)

5 August 2019; 11:00	Report	Brazil	4–20	United States	Villa María del Triunfo Aquatic Centre, Lima; Referees: Nestor Torres (PER); Daniel Vázquez (MEX)
5 August 2019; 11:00	Report	Score by quarters: 1-3, 1–3, 2-7, 0-7			Villa María del Triunfo Aquatic Centre, Lima; Referees: Nestor Torres (PER); Daniel Vázquez (MEX)
5 August 2019; 11:00	Report	four players 1	Goals	Fischer 4	Villa María del Triunfo Aquatic Centre, Lima; Referees: Nestor Torres (PER); Daniel Vázquez (MEX)

6 August 2019; 8:00	Report	Brazil	12–8	Puerto Rico	Villa María del Triunfo Aquatic Centre, Lima; Referees: Fernando Varela (PER); Daniel Daners (URU)
6 August 2019; 8:00	Report	Score by quarters: 3-1, 4-3, 2-1, 3-3			Villa María del Triunfo Aquatic Centre, Lima; Referees: Fernando Varela (PER); Daniel Daners (URU)
6 August 2019; 8:00	Report	Coutinho 4	Goals	Montero 3	Villa María del Triunfo Aquatic Centre, Lima; Referees: Fernando Varela (PER); Daniel Daners (URU)

6 August 2019; 11:00	Report	Venezuela	3–23	United States	Villa María del Triunfo Aquatic Centre, Lima; Referees: Nestor Torres (PER); Doriel Terpenka (CAN)
6 August 2019; 11:00	Report	Score by quarters: 0-11, 0-5, 1-4, 2-3			Villa María del Triunfo Aquatic Centre, Lima; Referees: Nestor Torres (PER); Doriel Terpenka (CAN)
6 August 2019; 11:00	Report	Torres 2	Goals	four players 3	Villa María del Triunfo Aquatic Centre, Lima; Referees: Nestor Torres (PER); Doriel Terpenka (CAN)

=== Group B ===
Pos	Team	Pld	W	D	L	GF	GA	GD	Pts	Qualification
1	Canada	3	3	0	0	75	13	+62	6	Quarterfinals
2	Cuba	3	2	0	1	37	29	+8	4	Quarterfinals
3	Mexico	3	1	0	2	32	41	−9	2	Quarterfinals
4	Peru (H)	3	0	0	3	8	69	−61	0	Quarterfinals

Source: Lima 2019
Rules for classification: 1) points; 2) head-to-head points; 3) head-to-head goal difference; 4) head-to-head number of goals scored; 5) goal difference.
(H) Hosts

4 August 2019; 9:30	Report	Cuba	5–20	Canada	Villa María del Triunfo Aquatic Centre, Lima; Referees: Reynel Torres (PUR); Amber Drury (USA)
4 August 2019; 9:30	Report	Score by quarters: 1-4, 1-4, 0-7, 3-5			Villa María del Triunfo Aquatic Centre, Lima; Referees: Reynel Torres (PUR); Amber Drury (USA)
4 August 2019; 9:30	Report	Villa 3	Goals	Crevier, Fournier 4	Villa María del Triunfo Aquatic Centre, Lima; Referees: Reynel Torres (PUR); Amber Drury (USA)

4 August 2019; 12:30	Report	Peru	1–22	Mexico	Villa María del Triunfo Aquatic Centre, Lima; Referees: Daniel Daners (URU); Diego Garibaldi (ARG)
4 August 2019; 12:30	Report	Score by quarters: 0-8, 1-5, 0-6, 0-3			Villa María del Triunfo Aquatic Centre, Lima; Referees: Daniel Daners (URU); Diego Garibaldi (ARG)
4 August 2019; 12:30	Report	Asmat 1	Goals	Livas 5	Villa María del Triunfo Aquatic Centre, Lima; Referees: Daniel Daners (URU); Diego Garibaldi (ARG)

5 August 2019; 9:30	Report	Peru	2–28	Canada	Villa María del Triunfo Aquatic Centre, Lima; Referees: Marcus Gresele (BRA); Ángel Irizarry (PUR)
5 August 2019; 9:30	Report	Score by quarters: 0-9, 0-6, 1-7, 1-6			Villa María del Triunfo Aquatic Centre, Lima; Referees: Marcus Gresele (BRA); Ángel Irizarry (PUR)
5 August 2019; 9:30	Report	Deza, Urquiza 1	Goals	Crevier, Wright 5	Villa María del Triunfo Aquatic Centre, Lima; Referees: Marcus Gresele (BRA); Ángel Irizarry (PUR)

5 August 2019; 12:30	Report	Cuba	13–4	Mexico	Villa María del Triunfo Aquatic Centre, Lima; Referees: Leonardo González (VEN); Fabio Toffoli (BRA)
5 August 2019; 12:30	Report	Score by quarters: 3-1, 2-0, 3-2, 5-1			Villa María del Triunfo Aquatic Centre, Lima; Referees: Leonardo González (VEN); Fabio Toffoli (BRA)
5 August 2019; 12:30	Report	Leyva, Villa 4	Goals	four players 1	Villa María del Triunfo Aquatic Centre, Lima; Referees: Leonardo González (VEN); Fabio Toffoli (BRA)

6 August 2019; 9:30	Report	Cuba	19–5	Peru	Villa María del Triunfo Aquatic Centre, Lima; Referees: Reynel Torres (PUR); Amber Drury (USA)
6 August 2019; 9:30	Report	Score by quarters: 4-0, 6-0, 4-1, 5-4			Villa María del Triunfo Aquatic Centre, Lima; Referees: Reynel Torres (PUR); Amber Drury (USA)
6 August 2019; 9:30	Report	Villa 4	Goals	Deza 2	Villa María del Triunfo Aquatic Centre, Lima; Referees: Reynel Torres (PUR); Amber Drury (USA)

6 August 2019; 12:30	Report	Canada	27–6	Mexico	Villa María del Triunfo Aquatic Centre, Lima; Referees: Steven Rotsart (USA); Fabio Toffoli (BRA)
6 August 2019; 12:30	Report	Score by quarters: 6-3, 5-1, 9-1, 7-1			Villa María del Triunfo Aquatic Centre, Lima; Referees: Steven Rotsart (USA); Fabio Toffoli (BRA)
6 August 2019; 12:30	Report	Wright 5	Goals	Ramírez 2	Villa María del Triunfo Aquatic Centre, Lima; Referees: Steven Rotsart (USA); Fabio Toffoli (BRA)

== Final round ==
=== Bracket ===
Quarterfinals
8 August
Brazil	13
Mexico	3
8 August
Venezuela	3
Canada	22
8 August
Puerto Rico	5
Cuba	14
8 August
United States	21
Peru	3

Semifinals
9 August
Brazil	5
Canada	19
9 August
Cuba	7
United States	31

Gold medal match
10 August
Canada	4
United States	24
Bronze medal match
10 August
Brazil	8
Cuba	7

5–8th place semifinals
9 August
Mexico	13
Venezuela	6
9 August
Puerto Rico	15
Peru	4

Fifth place
10 August
Mexico	12
Puerto Rico (PSO)	13
Seventh place
10 August
Venezuela	14
Peru	7

All times are local (UTC−5).

=== Quarterfinals ===
8 August 2019; 08:00	Report	Brazil	13–3	Mexico	VMT Aquatic Centre, Lima; Referees: Arkadi Voevodin (RUS); Amber Marie Drury (USA)
8 August 2019; 08:00	Report	Score by quarters: 2–1, 2–1, 4–0, 5–1			VMT Aquatic Centre, Lima; Referees: Arkadi Voevodin (RUS); Amber Marie Drury (USA)

8 August 2019; 09:30	Report	Puerto Rico	5–14	Cuba	VMT Aquatic Centre, Lima; Referees: Marie-Claude Deslieres (CAN); Néstor Ricardo Guerra Torres (PER)
8 August 2019; 09:30	Report	Score by quarters: 1–4, 1–2, 1–4, 2–4			VMT Aquatic Centre, Lima; Referees: Marie-Claude Deslieres (CAN); Néstor Ricardo Guerra Torres (PER)

8 August 2019; 11:00	Report	United States	21–3	Peru	VMT Aquatic Centre, Lima; Referees: Marcus Paulo Gresele (BRA); Leonardo González Toledo (VEN)
8 August 2019; 11:00	Report	Score by quarters: 5–1, 6–1, 6–0, 4–1			VMT Aquatic Centre, Lima; Referees: Marcus Paulo Gresele (BRA); Leonardo González Toledo (VEN)

8 August 2019; 12:30	Report	Venezuela	3–22	Canada	VMT Aquatic Centre, Lima; Referees: Diego Hernán Garibaldi (ARG); José Angel Ortiz Irizarry (PUR)
8 August 2019; 12:30	Report	Score by quarters: 0–8, 2–4, 0–6, 1–4			VMT Aquatic Centre, Lima; Referees: Diego Hernán Garibaldi (ARG); José Angel Ortiz Irizarry (PUR)

=== 5–8th place semifinals ===
9 August 2019; 08:00	Report	Mexico	13–6	Venezuela	VMT Aquatic Centre, Lima; Referees: Diego Garibaldi (ARG); Juan Menéndez (CUB)
9 August 2019; 08:00	Report	Score by quarters: 5–1, 1–3, 4–0, 3–2			VMT Aquatic Centre, Lima; Referees: Diego Garibaldi (ARG); Juan Menéndez (CUB)

9 August 2019; 09:30	Report	Puerto Rico	15–4	Peru	VMT Aquatic Centre, Lima; Referees: Marie-Claude Deslières (CAN); Yasmany Lima (CUB)
9 August 2019; 09:30	Report	Score by quarters: 3–0, 4–1, 3–1, 5–2			VMT Aquatic Centre, Lima; Referees: Marie-Claude Deslières (CAN); Yasmany Lima (CUB)

=== Semifinals ===
9 August 2019; 11:00	Report	Brazil	5–19	Canada	VMT Aquatic Centre, Lima; Referees: Arkadi Voevodin (RUS); José Angel Ortiz Irizarry (PUR)
9 August 2019; 11:00	Report	Score by quarters: 1–4, 3–5, 1–5, 0–5			VMT Aquatic Centre, Lima; Referees: Arkadi Voevodin (RUS); José Angel Ortiz Irizarry (PUR)

9 August 2019; 12:30	Report	Cuba	7–31	United States	VMT Aquatic Centre, Lima; Referees: Daniel Federico Daners (URU); Néstor Ricardo Guerra Torres (PER)
9 August 2019; 12:30	Report	Score by quarters: 2–9, 3–5, 0–11, 2–6			VMT Aquatic Centre, Lima; Referees: Daniel Federico Daners (URU); Néstor Ricardo Guerra Torres (PER)

=== 7th Place match ===
10 August 2019; 08:00	Report	Venezuela	14–7	Peru	VMT Aquatic Centre, Lima; Referees: Gerardo de Jesús Arellano Báez (MEX); Marcus Paulo Gresele (BRA)
10 August 2019; 08:00	Report	Score by quarters: 3–3, 2–1, 5–1, 4–2			VMT Aquatic Centre, Lima; Referees: Gerardo de Jesús Arellano Báez (MEX); Marcus Paulo Gresele (BRA)

=== 5th Place match ===
10 August 2019; 09:30	Report	Mexico	12–13 (PSO)	Puerto Rico	VMT Aquatic Centre, Lima; Referees: Daniel Federico Daners (URU); Leonardo González Toledo (VEN)
10 August 2019; 09:30	Report	Score by quarters: 1–3, 3–2, 4–4, 2–1 PSO: 2–3			VMT Aquatic Centre, Lima; Referees: Daniel Federico Daners (URU); Leonardo González Toledo (VEN)

=== Bronze Medal match ===
10 August 2019; 11:00	Report	Brazil	8–7	Cuba	VMT Aquatic Centre, Lima; Referees: Marie-Claude Deslieres (CAN); Amber Marie Drury (USA)
10 August 2019; 11:00	Report	Score by quarters: 0–1, 5–3, 2–2, 1–1			VMT Aquatic Centre, Lima; Referees: Marie-Claude Deslieres (CAN); Amber Marie Drury (USA)
10 August 2019; 11:00	Report	three players 2	Goals	Carrasco 3	VMT Aquatic Centre, Lima; Referees: Marie-Claude Deslieres (CAN); Amber Marie Drury (USA)

=== Gold Medal match ===
10 August 2019; 12:30	Report	(silver) Canada	4–24	United States (gold)	VMT Aquatic Centre, Lima; Referees: Daniel Rodrigo Vázquez (MEX); Fernado Varela Llanos (PER)
10 August 2019; 12:30	Report	Score by quarters: 1–6, 2–7, 1–10, 0–1			VMT Aquatic Centre, Lima; Referees: Daniel Rodrigo Vázquez (MEX); Fernado Varela Llanos (PER)
10 August 2019; 12:30	Report	four players 1	Goals	M. Fischer 6	VMT Aquatic Centre, Lima; Referees: Daniel Rodrigo Vázquez (MEX); Fernado Varela Llanos (PER)

== Ranking and statistics ==
=== Final ranking ===
Rank	Team	Record	Olympic Qualification
1st place, gold medalist(s)	United States		Already qualified for 2020 Olympic Games
2nd place, silver medalist(s)	Canada		Qualifies directly for 2020 Olympic Games
3rd place, bronze medalist(s)	Brazil		
4	Cuba		
5	Puerto Rico		
6	Mexico		
7	Venezuela		
8	Peru		

=== Top goalscorers ===
- Report

Rank	Name	Goals	Shots	%
1	(United States) Stephania Haralabidis	22	27	81.5
2	(United States) Makenzie Fischer	21	26	80.8
3	(Cuba) Mayelin Bernal	18	34	52.9
3	(Canada) Axelle Crevier	18	26	69,2
5	(Canada) Shae Fournier	17	32	53.1
5	(Canada) Emma Wright	17	32	53.1
