= Marina Zablith =

Brazilian water polo player (born 1987)

Personal information
- Full name: Marina Aranha Zablith
- Born: 4 March 1987 (age 39) Brazil
- Height: 182 cm (6 ft 0 in)
- Weight: 77 kg (170 lb)

Sport
- Sport: water polo
Medal record
Representing Brazil
Pan American Games
Bronze medal – third place	2011 Guadalajara	Team
Bronze medal – third place	2015 Toronto	Team
- Updated on 19 August 2015

Marina Aranha Zablith (born 4 March 1987) is a female water polo player of Brazil.

She was part of the Brazilian team at the Water polo at the 2011 Pan American Games, and 2015 World Aquatics Championships, and 2017 World Aquatics Championships. She participated in the 2016 Summer Olympics.

== See also ==
- Brazil at the 2015 World Aquatics Championships
