= Angela Winstanley-Smith =

British water polo player, and coach (born 1985)

Personal information
- Nickname: Angie
- Born: 5 August 1985 (age 40) South Shields, England
- Height: 1.79 m (5 ft 10 in)
- Weight: 66 kg (146 lb)

Sport
- Country: Great Britain
- Sport: Water polo

Angela "Angie" Winstanley-Smith (born 5 August 1985) is a British water polo player, and coach.

She competed for Great Britain in the women's tournament in the 2012 Summer Olympics. This was the first ever Olympic GB women's water polo team. She competed at the 2013 World Aquatics Championships.

She was the head coach of the New Zealand Women's Water Polo team, at the 2017 World Aquatics Championships.

She was appointed after taking the Marist Magic to back to back New Zealand titles. This included an undefeated season in 2016.
