= Elyse Lemay-Lavoie =

Canadian water polo player (born 1994)

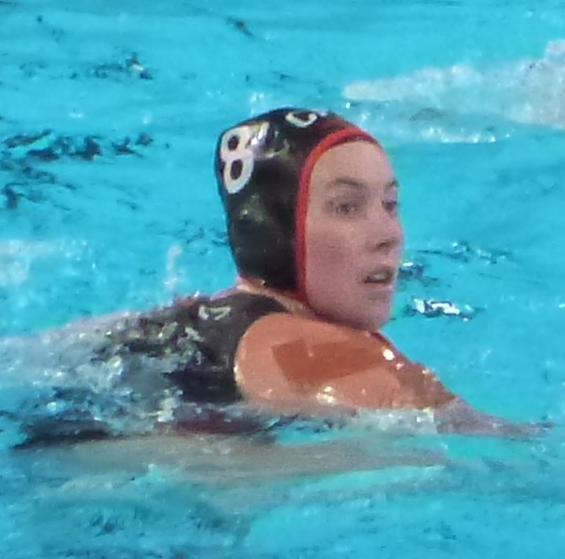

Personal information
- Born: 12 November 1994 (age 31) Montreal, Quebec, Canada
- Height: 174 cm (5 ft 9 in)

Sport
- Sport: Water polo
- Team: Canada women's national water polo team; Université de Montréal; University of Hawaii
Medal record
Representing Canada
Pan American Games
Silver medal – second place	2019 Lima	Team
Silver medal – second place	2023 Santiago	Team

Elyse Lemay-Lavoie (born 12 November 1994) is a Canadian water polo player who is a member of the Canada women's national water polo team. She was part of the team at the 2017 FINA World League, 2017 World Aquatics Championships, 2018 FINA World League, 2019 FINA World League, and 2019 Pan-American Games. She was part of the team in the women's water polo tournament at the 2020 Summer Olympics.

She played for the Université de Montréal's women's water polo team and University of Hawaii's women's water polo team.
