= Viviane Bahia =

Brazilian water polo player (born 1994)

Personal information
- Full name: Viviane Kretzmann Bahia
- Born: 14 February 1994 (age 32) Rio de Janeiro, Brazil
- Height: 176 cm (5 ft 9 in)
- Weight: 68 kg (150 lb)
Medal record
Women's water polo
Representing Brazil
Pan American Games
| Bronze medal – third place | 2015 Toronto | Team |
| Bronze medal – third place | 2019 Lima | Team |
- Updated on 19 August 2015

Viviane Kretzmann Bahia (born 14 February 1994) is a female water polo player of Brazil.

She was part of the Brazilian team at the 2015 World Aquatics Championships. She participated in the 2016 Summer Olympics.

== See also ==
- Brazil at the 2015 World Aquatics Championships
