= Peng Lin (water polo) =

Chinese water polo player (born 1995)

Personal information
- Born: 4 April 1995 (age 31) Yueyang, Hunan, China
- Height: 185 cm (6 ft 1 in)
- Weight: 72 kg (159 lb)

Sport
- Sport: water polo
Medal record
Representing China
Asian Games
Gold medal – first place	2014 Incheon	Team competition
Gold medal – first place	2018 Jakarta	Team competition
- Updated on 19 August 2015

Peng Lin (彭林; born 4 April 1995) is a water polo player for China.

She was part of the Chinese team at the 2015 World Aquatics Championships, the 2016 FINA Women's Water Polo World League, the 2016 Summer Olympics, and the 2017 World Aquatics Championships.

== See also ==
- China women's Olympic water polo team records and statistics
- List of women's Olympic water polo tournament goalkeepers
