= Rosaria Aiello =

Italian water polo player

Personal information
- Nationality: Italian
- Born: 12 May 1989 (age 37) Catania, Italy
- Height: 1.72 m (5 ft 8 in)
- Weight: 74 kg (163 lb)

Sport
- Country: Italy
- Sport: Water polo
Medal record
Olympic Games
Silver medal – second place	2016 Rio de Janeiro	Team
World Championships
Bronze medal – third place	2015 Kazan	Team
European Championships
Gold medal – first place	2012 Eindhoven
Bronze medal – third place	2016 Belgrade

Rosaria Aiello (born 12 May 1989) is an Italian water polo player.

She was part of the Italian team winning the bronze medal at the 2015 World Aquatics Championships, where she played in the centre forward position, and the 2017 World Aquatics Championships. She participated at the 2016 Summer Olympics.

== See also ==
- List of Olympic medalists in water polo (women)
- List of World Aquatics Championships medalists in water polo
