= Yuki Niizawa =

Japanese water polo player

Personal information
- Nationality: Japan
- Born: February 13, 1997 (age 29)

Sport
- Sport: Water polo
Medal record
Women's water polo
Representing Japan
Summer Universiade
Bronze medal – third place	2017 Taipei	Team
Asian Games
Bronze medal – third place	2018 Jakarta	Team

Yuki Niizawa (新澤由貴, Niizawa Yuki; born 13 February 1997) is a Japanese water polo player. She competed in the 2020 Summer Olympics.
