= Marina Tokumoto =

Japanese water polo player

Personal information
- Nationality: Japan
- Born: February 2, 1996 (age 30)

Sport
- Sport: Water polo
Medal record
Women's water polo
Representing Japan
Summer Universiade
Bronze medal – third place	2017 Taipei	Team
Asian Games
Bronze medal – third place	2018 Jakarta	Team

Marina Tokumoto (徳用万里奈, Mokumoto Marina; born 2 February 1996) is a Japanese water polo player. She competed in the 2020 Summer Olympics.
