= Minori Yamamoto (water polo) =

Japanese water polo player

Personal information
- Nationality: Japan
- Born: October 14, 1997 (age 28)

Sport
- Sport: Water polo
Medal record
Women's water polo
Representing Japan
Summer Universiade
Bronze medal – third place	2017 Taipei	Team
Asian Games
Bronze medal – third place	2018 Jakarta	Team

Minori Yamamoto (山本実乃里, Yamamoto Minori; born 14 October 1997) is a Japanese water polo player. She competed in the 2020 Summer Olympics.
