= Alys Williams (water polo) =

American water polo player (born 1994)

Personal information
- Full name: Alys Nicole Williams -Moore
- Born: May 28, 1994 (age 32) Fountain Valley, California, U.S.
- Education: UCLA (2017) Psychology
- Occupations: Water Polo Coach; *Asst. U. Cal. Irvine; *Olympic Youth Team 2026-
- Height: 5 ft 11 in (180 cm)
- Weight: 160 lb (73 kg)
- Spouse: Cody Moore (m. 2020)

Sport
- Country: United States
- Sport: Water Polo
- Position: Defender (Usually Driver or Wing)
- College team: University of California Los Angeles
- Club: Huntington Beach WP Federation
- Coached by: Diggy Riley (Edison High); Natalie Golda (Huntington Beach WP); Adam Krikorian (UCLA); Adam Krikorian ('20 Olympics)
Medal record
Women's water polo
Representing the United States
Olympic Games
Gold medal – first place	2020 Tokyo	Team
World Championships
Gold medal – first place	2015 Kazan	Team
Gold medal – first place	2017 Budapest	Team
Gold medal – first place	2019 Gwangju	Team
Summer Universiade
Gold medal – first place	2017 Taipei	Team

Alys Nicole Williams (born May 28, 1994), also known after 2020 by her married name Alys Nicole Williams Moore is an American water polo player who competed for the University of California Los Angeles. She has served as a member of the United States women's national water polo team, and participated in the 2020 Tokyo Summer Olympics, where she won a gold medal in the 2020 Women's water polo competition. Immediately following the 2020 Olympics, she served as an Assistant Coach for the women's team at the University of California Irvine, and was announced as the Head Coach for the Olympic Water Polo Development's Youth Team in February 2024.

== Early life ==
Williams was born one of three sisters in Fountain Valley, California, to Robert and Constance Williams. Both her sisters played water polo and her father Robert played water polo for Long Beach State, a strong team. Though not taking immediately to the sport, Alys began playing water polo at eight for the Newport Beach Club where she was coached by her father. Alys grew up in Huntington Beach and attended Edison High School, graduating in 2012. Lettering for four years in Varsity Water Polo at Edison, she dropped her participation in soccer and basketball and gained focus training and competing under Edison High Coach Diggy Riley. Recognized as exceptional among her fellow high school athletes, in 2012 she was an Athlete of the Year for Edison High. In Edison school honors, she held the all-time record for water polo total career goals with 353, as well as the record for assists with 214. An able student, she earned All-American honors in High School Academics in 2012.

In club competition, Williams began playing for the Huntington Beach Club in her first year of High School, where one of her primary coaches was 2004 and 2008 Olympic water polo medalist Natalie Golda, a former standout for UCLA. Representing Huntington Beach, Alys made All-American honors in 2009, 2010, and 2012 in Junior Olympic competition, and placed first with the Huntington Club water polo team in the Junior Olympics in 2011 and second in 2012.

== University of California Los Angeles ==
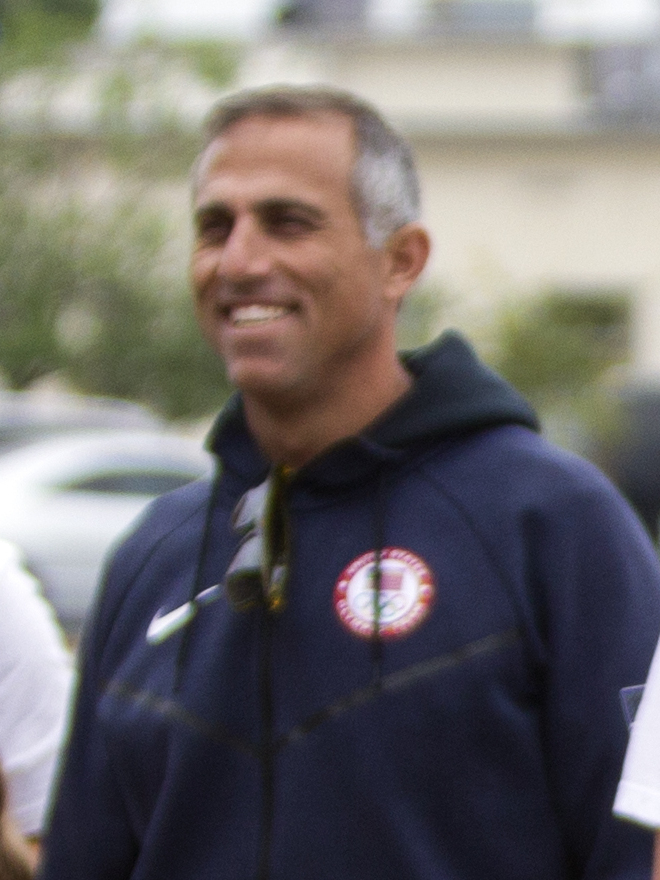
Krikorian in 2018

Williams attended University of California, Los Angeles, as a Psychology major, and graduated in 2017. She took off much of 2016 to train with the U.S. National team, but was unable to qualify for the 2016 Olympics. Playing water polo under Hall of Fame UCLA Coach, Adam Krikorian, she earned All-American honors in four years and was part of the nationally dominant UCLA women's teams that won the NCAA National Championship in 2014, 2015 and 2017.

== International competition highlights ==
Williams played on the U.S. national team that that won gold medals at the World Championships in 2015 in Kazan in Tartarstan, Russia, in 2017 in Budapest, Hungary and in 2019 in Gwanju, China where she scored four goals. She won another gold medal with the U.S. National team at the 2017 Summer Universiade in Taipei, where she competed in the 2017 Universiade Women's water polo competition.

=== Marriage ===
Around December 2020, prior to the 2020 Olympics, which were held in the summer of 2021 due to the global COVID epidemic, Williams married Cody James Moore of Woodland Hills, California. Cody had also played water polo at UCLA, where the couple likely met.

== 2020 Tokyo Olympic gold ==
Williams participated in the 2020 Summer Olympics in Tokyo, under Head Olympic Coach Adam Krikorian, where she won a team gold medal, and scored a total of eight goals in the Women's water polo team competition. In 2020, the United States was a distinct pre-Olympic favorite to win the gold medal, having captured the two previous Olympic medals in 2012 and 2016 under Krikorian, as well as having won the 2015, 2017, and 2019 World Championships.

In final competition, the U.S. women's team won the gold medal, defeating Spain 14–5 in the final round to determine the gold and silver medal winners. Among her eight total goals, Alys scored two in the final gold medal round against Spain. Strong in the late rounds, the U.S. Women had previously won both their quarter-final and semi-final rounds, while Spain beat the strong women's teams from China and Hungary to also move to the final round. In early rounds, in an unexpected outcome, the U.S. women had lost to Hungary, a country with a strong enduring tradition in men's water polo. As noted, the U.S. women took the gold medal, Spain took the silver, and Hungary took the bronze.

== Careers ==
Williams played water polo professionally for Spain's CN St. Andrew from 2017 to 2018 which reached the League Finals.

=== Coaching ===
Mentored by Head Coach Dan Klatt, Williams worked as an Assistant coach for the women's water polo team at the University of California Irvine beginning in October 2022 where she remained through 2026. She has had a role in leading the team to Big West Championships in both 2023 and 2022 and to an undefeated 2023 season in regular league games. She has also coached at the Newport Beach Water Polo Club beginning around 2018, where she was a former young age-group member. In a significant career assignment, in February 2024, she was announced as the Head Coach for the Olympic Water Polo Development's Youth Team with Assistant Coaches James Robinson and Doug Eichstaedt.

== See also ==
- UC Irvine Anteaters, Women's Water Polo Section

=== Honors ===
Williams became a member of the Edison High School Alumni Hall of Fame in 2023.
