= Shae La Roche =

Canadian water polo player (born 1992)

Personal information
- Born: September 3, 1992 (age 34) Calgary, Alberta, Canada
- Height: 1.70 m (5 ft 7 in)
- Weight: 65 kg (143 lb)

Sport
- Sport: Water polo
- Position: Attacker
- College team: Indiana Hoosiers
- Current club: (Italy) SIS Roma
Medal record
Women's water polo
Representing Canada
Pan American Games
Silver medal – second place	2015 Toronto	Team
Silver medal – second place	2019 Lima	Team
FINA World League
Silver medal – second place	2017 Shanghai

Shae La Roche (née Fournier; born September 3, 1992) is a Canadian water polo player. She won the silver medal with the Women's National Team at the 2015 Pan American Games and the 2019 Pan American Games. She competed at the 2020 Summer Olympics.

== College career ==
Fournier attended Indiana University playing on the water polo team from 2011 to 2018. In her senior year at Indiana University she became the school’s first water polo player to earn Academic All-American honours. She was also a second-team All-American and Collegiate Water Polo Association Player of the Year. She set a Hoosiers record with 302 career goals, making her one of only five players in NCAA history to score 300 or more goals.

== International career ==
Fournier made her senior debut in 2014, competing in the FINA Water Polo World League. In 2017 she won the silver medal at the 2017 FINA Women's Water Polo World League held in Shanghai, China. In June 2021, La Roche was named to Canada's 2020 Summer Olympics team.
