= Brazil men's national water polo team =

Men's national water polo team representing Brazil

Brazil
- FINA code: BRA
- Association: Brazilian Confederation of Aquatic Sports (CBDA)
- Confederation: UANA (Americas)
- Head coach: Thiago Nascimento
- Asst coach: George Chaia; Renan Rossin
- Captain: Gustavo Guimarães

FINA ranking (since 2008)
- Highest: 10 (2016, 2017)

Olympic Games (team statistics)
- Appearances: 8 (first in 1920)
- Best result: 6th place (1920)

World Championship
- Appearances: 12 (first in 1986)
- Best result: 10th place (2015)

World League
- Appearances: 11 (first in 2002)
- Best result: (bronze) 2015

Pan American Games
- Appearances: 18 (first in 1951)
- Best result: (gold) (1963)

UANA Cup (ASUA Cup)
- Best result: (gold) (2017, 2019, 2024)
Medal record
Men's water polo
World League
Bronze medal – third place	2015 Bergamo
Pan American Games
Gold medal – first place	1963 São Paulo	Team
Silver medal – second place	1951 Buenos Aires	Team
Silver medal – second place	1967 Winnipeg	Team
Silver medal – second place	1995 Mar del Plata	Team
Silver medal – second place	2003 Santo Domingo	Team
Silver medal – second place	2007 Rio de Janeiro	Team
Silver medal – second place	2015 Toronto	Team
Silver medal – second place	2023 Santiago	Team
Bronze medal – third place	1955 Mexico City	Team
Bronze medal – third place	1959 Chicago	Team
Bronze medal – third place	1987 Indianapolis	Team
Bronze medal – third place	1991 Havana	Team
Bronze medal – third place	2011 Guadalajara	Team
Bronze medal – third place	2019 Lima	Team
UANA Cup (ASUA Cup)
Gold medal – first place	2017 Trinidad
Gold medal – first place	2019 São Paulo
Silver medal – second place	2011 Victoria
Silver medal – second place	2015 Toronto
Bronze medal – third place	2013 Calgary
- Last updated: 1 May 2020

The Brazil men's national water polo team represents Brazil in international men's water polo competitions and friendly matches.

== Results ==
=== Olympic Games ===
- 1920 – 6th place
- 1932 – disqualified
- 1952 – 9th place
- 1960 – 12th place
- 1964 – 13th place
- 1968 – 13th place
- 1984 – 12th place
- 2016 – 8th place

=== World Championship ===
- 1986 – 12th place
- 1998 – 12th place
- 2001 – 13th place
- 2003 – 13th place
- 2009 – 13th place
- 2011 – 14th place
- 2015 – 10th place
- 2017 – 12th place
- 2019 – 13th place
- 2022 – 15th place
- 2023 – Withdrew
- 2024 – 14th place
- 2025 – 12th place

=== World League ===
- 2002 – 8th place
- 2003 – 8th place
- 2004 – 8th place
- 2005 – Preliminary round
- 2006 – 12th place
- 2010 – 16th place
- 2012 – 8th place
- 2013 – 8th place
- 2014 – 7th place
- 2015 – (bronze) Bronze medal
- 2016 – 7th place

=== Pan American Games ===
- 1951 – (silver) Silver medal
- 1955 – (bronze) Bronze medal
- 1959 – (bronze) Bronze medal
- 1963 – (gold) Gold medal
- 1967 – (silver) Silver medal
- 1971 – 4th place
- 1975 – Did not participate
- 1979 – 6th place
- 1983 – 4th place
- 1987 – (bronze) Bronze medal
- 1991 – (bronze) Bronze medal
- 1995 – (silver) Silver medal
- 1999 – 4th place
- 2003 – (silver) Silver medal
- 2007 – (silver) Silver medal
- 2011 – (bronze) Bronze medal
- 2015 – (silver) Silver medal
- 2019 – (bronze) Bronze medal
- 2023 – (silver) Silver medal

=== UANA Cup ===
- 2011 – (silver) Silver medal
- 2013 – (bronze) Bronze medal
- 2015 – (silver) Silver medal
- 2017 – (gold) Gold medal
- 2019 – (gold) Gold medal
- 2023 – (silver) Silver Medal

=== Summer Universiade ===
- 1963 – (bronze) Bronze medal

=== South American Swimming Championships ===
- 2006 – (gold) Gold medal
- 2008 – (gold) Gold medal
- 2012 – (silver) Silver medal
- 2014 – (gold) Gold medal

== Team ==
=== Current squad ===
Roster for the 2025 World Championships.

Head coach: Thiago Nascimento

- 1 João Gabriel Silveira GK
- 2 Logan Cabral FP
- 3 Gabriel da Silva FP
- 4 Gustavo Coutinho FP
- 5 André Luiz Freitas FP
- 6 Marcos Paulo Pedroso FP
- 7 Lucas Farias FP
- 8 Pedro Real FP
- 9 Paulo Ricardo Oliveira FP
- 10 Lucas Andrade FP
- 11 Gustavo Guimarães FP
- 12 Luis Ricardo Silva FP
- 13 João Pedro Fernandes GK
- 14 Joao Pedro Leme FP
- 15 Lucas Wulfhorst FP

=== Squads ===
- 1951 Pan American Games – Silver Medal
  - Alfonso Zaparoli, Armando João Caropresco, Claudino Caiado de Castro, Edson Perri, Guilherme Schall, Isaac dos Santos Moraes, João Havelange, Leo Rossi, Luiz Antonio dos Santos, Milton Busin, Nelson Brescia, Samuel Schemberg, and Saverio Gregorut.
- 1955 Pan American Games – Bronze Medal
  - Adhemar Grijó Filho, Amaury Fonseca, Denir Freitas Ribeiro, Edson Perri, Eduardo Antonio Alijó, Everaldo Luiz A. Cruz, Hilton de Almeida, Márvio Kelly dos Santos, Roberto Lara de Araújo, Rodney Stuart Bell, and Rolf Egon Kesterner.
- 1959 Pan American Games – Bronze Medal
  - Adhemar Grijó Filho, Everardo Luiz Cruz Filho, Flávio Ribeiro Ratto, Hilton de Almeida, João Gonçalves Filho, Luiz Daniel, Márvio Kelly dos Santos, Paulo Bruzzi Cochrane, Rodney Stuart Bell, and Sylvio Kelly dos Santos.
- 1963 Pan American Games – Gold Medal
  - Adhemar Grijó Filho, Aladar Szabo, Flávio Ribeiro Ratto, Ivo Kesselring Carotini, João Gonçalves Filho, Luiz Carlos A. Valim, Luiz Daniel, Luiz Euardo P. Lima, Marvio Kelly dos Santos, and Paulo Kesselring Carotini.
- 1967 Pan American Games – Silver Medal
  - João Gonçalves Filho, Ivo Kesselring Carotini, Henrique Fillelini, Luiz Eduardo P. Lima, Claudio Rinaldi C. Lima, Pedro Pinciroli Jr., Arnaldo Marsili, Marcos Vargas da Costa, Rodney Stuart Bell, and Paulo Kesselring Carotini.
- 1984 Olympic Games – 12th place
  - Roberto Borelli, Orlando Chaves, Paulo Abreu, Carlos Carvalho, Sílvio Manfredi, Solon Santos, Ricardo Tonieto, Eric Tebbe Borges, Mario Souto, Mario Sergio Lotufo, Fernando Carsalade, Hélio Silva, and André Campos. Head Coach: Edson Perri
- 1987 Pan American Games – Bronze Medal
  - Ayrton P. C. Silva, Eduardo R. V. Comini, Eric T. Borges, Fernando Rocha Filho, Fernando Carsalade, Francisco Chaves Neto, Gilberto Gargiulo, Gilberto Guimarães, Hélio F. Gomes Filho, João Meireles, Mario E. A. Souto, Sergio S. Figueiredo Jr., and Sílvio Manfredi.
- 1991 Pan American Games – Bronze Medal
  - Antonio Carlos Costa, Armando Gutfreund, Daniel Polidoro Mameri, Eduardo Vale Comini, Eric Tebbe Borges, Fernando Alberto Rocha Filho, Giuliano Bertolucci, Hélio Frederico Gomes Filho, João Antonio Meireles, Paulo Francisco J. Abreu, Paulo R. Vale Comini, Roberto Bruno S. Chiappini, and Rodney Andrew Bell.
- 1995 Pan American Games – Silver Medal
  - Adriano Marsili, Alexandre Miguel Lopes, Armando Gutfreund, Daniel Mameri, Diogo Freitas, Erik Seegerer, Guilherme Pinciroli, Michel Vieira, Paulo César Fernandes, Ricardo Perrone, Roberto Chiappini, Rodrigo Fernandes, and Yansel Galindo.
- 2003 World Championship – 13th place
  - Fábio Chiquidimo, André Cordeiro, Yansel Galindo, Vicente Henriques, Alexandre Lopez, Leandro Ruiz Machado, Daniel Mameri, Felipe Perrone, Gabriel Reis, Rodrigo dos Santos, Roberto Seabra, Erik Seegerer, and André Raposo. Head Coach: Carlos Carvalho.
- 2003 Pan American Games – Silver Medal
  - André Capiberibe, André Cordeiro, Yansel Galindo, André Raposo, Felipe Perrone, Daniel Mameri, Erik Seegerer, Fábio Chiquidimo, Gabriel Reis, Leandro Ruiz Machado, Roberto Seabra, Rodrigo dos Santos, and Vicente Henriques. Head Coach: Carlos Carvalho
- 2004 Olympic Qualifying Tournament – 7th place
  - Marcelo Chagas, André Cordeiro, Felipe Franco, Leandro Ruiz Machado, Daniel Mameri, Rafael Murad, Felipe Perrone, Gabriel Reis, João Santos, Rodrigo dos Santos, Roberto Seabra, Erik Seegerer, and Felipe Silva. Head Coach: Carlos Carvalho.
- 2007 Pan American Games – Silver Medal
  - André Cordeiro, André Raposo, Bruno Nolasco, Daniel Mameri, Erik Seegerer, Felipe Franco, Gabriel Reis, Leandro Ruiz Machado, Lucas Vita, Luís Santos, Roberto Seabra, Rodrigo dos Santos, and Vicente Henriques. Head Coach: Barbaro Diaz
- 2008 Olympic Qualifying Tournament – 9th place
  - Conrado Bertoluzzi, Mario Carotini, Rafael Farias, Marcelo Franco, Vicente Henriques, Bruno Nolasco, Gabriel Reis, Bernardo Rocca, Luís Santos, Erik Seegerer, Felipe Silva, Anderson Souza, and Lucas Vita. Head Coach: Barbaro Dias.
- 2011 Pan American Games – Bronze Medal
  - Henrique Carvalho, João Coelho, Danilo Correa, Jonas Crivella, Marcelo das Chagas, Felipe Silva (water polo), Luís dos Santos, Marcelo Franco, Ruda Franco, Gustavo Guimarães, Bernardo Rocha, Gabriel Rocha, and Emilio Vieira.
- 2015 FINA World League – Bronze Medal
  - Adrià Delgado, Bernardo Gomes, Bernardo Rocha, Felipe Perrone, Felipe Silva (water polo), Guilherme Gomes, Gustavo Guimarães, Ives Alonso, Jonas Crivella, Josip Vrlić, Paulo Salemi, Thyê Bezerra, and Vinicius Antonelli.
- 2015 Pan American Games – Silver Medal
  - Adrià Delgado, Bernardo Gomes, Bernardo Rocha, Felipe Perrone, Felipe Silva (water polo), Guilherme Gomes, Gustavo Guimarães, Ives Alonso, Jonas Crivella, Josip Vrlić, Paulo Salemi, Thyê Bezerra, and Vinicius Antonelli.

=== Notable players ===
- Adrià Delgado
- Felipe Perrone (later Spain)
- Ricardo Perrone (later Spain)

== See also ==
- Brazil men's Olympic water polo team records and statistics
- Brazil women's national water polo team
