= Water polo at the 2022 South American Games – Men's tournament =

2022 South American Games Men's Water polo tournament
Tournament details
- Country: Paraguay
- City: Asunción
- Venue: Centro Acuático Nacional
- Dates: 11–15 October 2022
- Teams: 6 (from 1 confederation)

Final positions
- Champions: BRA (1st title)
- Runners-up: ARG
- Third place: COL
- Fourth place: CHI

Tournament statistics
- Matches played: 20
- Goals scored: 422 (21.1 per match)
- Top scorer: (Argentina) Exequiel Camnasio (27 goals)

Official website
- Tournament website

The men's tournament of the water polo at the 2022 South American Games was held from 11 to 15 October 2022 at the Centro Acuático Nacional in Asunción, Paraguay. It was the third appearance of the water polo men's tournament since the first edition in Medellín 2010.

The tournament served as qualifier for the 2023 Pan American Games, with the top two teams qualifying to the men's water polo tournament.

Brazil won the gold medal and their first South American Games men's water polo title after beating the defending champions Argentina 13–12 (3–2 on penalties) in the final. Both teams, Brazil and Argentina, qualified for the 2023 Pan American Games as the CONSANAT representatives, besides Chile who qualified automatically as hosts.

Colombia beat Chile 18–6 to win the bronze medal.

== Schedule ==
The tournament was held over a 5-day period, from 11 to 15 October.

PR	Preliminary round	SF	Semi-finals	B	Bronze medal match	F	Gold medal match

Tue 11	Wed 12	Thu 13	Fri 14	Sat 15	
PR	PR	PR	SF	B	F
6 M	3 M	6 M	3 M	2 M	

== Teams ==
A total of six ODESUR NOCs entered teams for the men's tournament. Originally, the tournament was going to be contested by seven teams including Peru, however, the Peruvian team decided to withdraw due to logistical reasons.

Teams	App	Previous best performance
Argentina	3rd	Gold medal (2010, 2018)
Brazil	2nd	Bronze medal (2010)
Chile	1st	Debut
Colombia	3rd	Silver medal (2010, 2018)
Paraguay	1st	Debut
~~Peru~~	~~3rd~~	Fourth place (2018)
Uruguay	1st	Debut

=== Rosters ===
Each participating NOC had to enter a roster of 13 players, including at least 2 goalkeepers (Technical manual Article 10.2).

== Results ==
All match times are in PYST (UTC−3).

=== Preliminary round ===
The preliminary round consisted of a single group of 6 teams in which each team played once against the other 5 teams in the group on a round-robin format. The top four teams advanced to the semi-finals and the two bottom teams played for the fifth place.

Pos	Team	Pld	W	D	L	GF	GA	GD	Pts	Qualification
1	Argentina	5	5	0	0	87	18	+69	10	Semi-finals
2	Brazil	5	4	0	1	76	21	+55	8	Semi-finals
3	Colombia	5	3	0	2	66	34	+32	6	Semi-finals
4	Chile	5	2	0	3	34	50	−16	4	Semi-finals
5	Uruguay	5	1	0	4	43	61	−18	2	Fifth place match
6	Paraguay	5	0	0	5	5	127	−122	0	Fifth place match

Source: ASU2022
Rules for classification: 1) points; 2) head-to-head points; 3) head-to-head goal difference; 4) head-to-head number of goals scored; 5) goal difference.

11 October 2022; 9:00	Report	Uruguay	32–2	Paraguay	Centro Acuático Nacional; Referees: García, Carlos Paipilla (COL)
11 October 2022; 9:00	Report	Score by quarters: 10–0, 10–2, 5–0, 7–0			Centro Acuático Nacional; Referees: García, Carlos Paipilla (COL)
11 October 2022; 9:00	Report	Domínguez 8	Goals	Taboada, Cameron 1	Centro Acuático Nacional; Referees: García, Carlos Paipilla (COL)

11 October 2022; 10:20	Report	Brazil	15–0	Chile	Centro Acuático Nacional; Referees: Daners, Rincón
11 October 2022; 10:20	Report	Score by quarters: 4–0, 6–0, 2–0, 3–0			Centro Acuático Nacional; Referees: Daners, Rincón
11 October 2022; 10:20	Report	three players 3	Goals		Centro Acuático Nacional; Referees: Daners, Rincón

11 October 2022; 11:40	Report	Colombia	6–11	Argentina	Centro Acuático Nacional; Referees: Teixido, Fernandes
11 October 2022; 11:40	Report	Score by quarters: 1–3, 4–2, 1–3, 0–3			Centro Acuático Nacional; Referees: Teixido, Fernandes
11 October 2022; 11:40	Report	Muñoz 2	Goals	Camnasio, Veich 3	Centro Acuático Nacional; Referees: Teixido, Fernandes

11 October 2022; 18:00	Report	Colombia	12–1	Chile	Centro Acuático Nacional; Referees: Monteiro, Teixido
11 October 2022; 18:00	Report	Score by quarters: 4–1, 2–0, 1–0, 5–0			Centro Acuático Nacional; Referees: Monteiro, Teixido
11 October 2022; 18:00	Report	Lizarazo 4	Goals	Otayza 1	Centro Acuático Nacional; Referees: Monteiro, Teixido

11 October 2022; 19:20	Report	Uruguay	2–25	Brazil	Centro Acuático Nacional; Referees: Perré, Alejos
11 October 2022; 19:20	Report	Score by quarters: 0–8, 1–8, 0–4, 1–5			Centro Acuático Nacional; Referees: Perré, Alejos
11 October 2022; 19:20	Report	Martinez Bon 2	Goals	Freitas 5	Centro Acuático Nacional; Referees: Perré, Alejos

11 October 2022; 20:40	Report	Argentina	25–0	Paraguay	Centro Acuático Nacional; Referees: Alfaro, Rincón
11 October 2022; 20:40	Report	Score by quarters: 5–0, 6–0, 7–0, 7–0			Centro Acuático Nacional; Referees: Alfaro, Rincón
11 October 2022; 20:40	Report	Setti 6	Goals		Centro Acuático Nacional; Referees: Alfaro, Rincón

12 October 2022; 13:30	Report	Chile	3–2	Uruguay	Centro Acuático Nacional; Referees: Di Biasio, Teixido
12 October 2022; 13:30	Report	Score by quarters: 0–1, 2–1, 0–0, 1–0			Centro Acuático Nacional; Referees: Di Biasio, Teixido
12 October 2022; 13:30	Report	three players 1	Goals	Domínguez, Upery 2	Centro Acuático Nacional; Referees: Di Biasio, Teixido

12 October 2022; 14:50	Report	Paraguay	0–31	Colombia	Centro Acuático Nacional; Referees: Alejos, Queipo
12 October 2022; 14:50	Report	Score by quarters: 0–10, 0–9, 0–5, 0–7			Centro Acuático Nacional; Referees: Alejos, Queipo
12 October 2022; 14:50	Report		Goals	Guapacha 12	Centro Acuático Nacional; Referees: Alejos, Queipo

12 October 2022; 16:10	Report	Argentina	10–8	Brazil	Centro Acuático Nacional; Referees: Daners, Alfaro
12 October 2022; 16:10	Report	Score by quarters: 4–1, 3–3, 0–3, 3–1			Centro Acuático Nacional; Referees: Daners, Alfaro
12 October 2022; 16:10	Report	Camnasio 5	Goals	Freitas 3	Centro Acuático Nacional; Referees: Daners, Alfaro

13 October 2022; 9:00	Report	Chile	27–1	Paraguay	Centro Acuático Nacional; Referees: Perré, Queipo
13 October 2022; 9:00	Report	Score by quarters: 8–1, 4–0, 7–0, 8–0			Centro Acuático Nacional; Referees: Perré, Queipo
13 October 2022; 9:00	Report	four players 4	Goals	Pucciarelli 1	Centro Acuático Nacional; Referees: Perré, Queipo

13 October 2022; 10:20	Report	Argentina	21–1	Uruguay	Centro Acuático Nacional; Referees: Villanueva, Rincón
13 October 2022; 10:20	Report	Score by quarters: 2–0, 7–0, 7–1, 5–0			Centro Acuático Nacional; Referees: Villanueva, Rincón
13 October 2022; 10:20	Report	Camnasio 5	Goals	Rieppi 1	Centro Acuático Nacional; Referees: Villanueva, Rincón

13 October 2022; 11:40	Report	Brazil	16–7	Colombia	Centro Acuático Nacional; Referees: García, Di Biasio
13 October 2022; 11:40	Report	Score by quarters: 3–0, 3–3, 4–2, 6–2			Centro Acuático Nacional; Referees: García, Di Biasio
13 October 2022; 11:40	Report	Chiappini, Coutinho 4	Goals	Mora 2	Centro Acuático Nacional; Referees: García, Di Biasio

13 October 2022; 18:00	Report	Argentina	20–3	Chile	Centro Acuático Nacional; Referees: Queipo, Carlos Paipilla (COL)
13 October 2022; 18:00	Report	Score by quarters: 5–1, 5–1, 6–1, 4–0			Centro Acuático Nacional; Referees: Queipo, Carlos Paipilla (COL)
13 October 2022; 18:00	Report	Camnasio 5	Goals	Castro 2	Centro Acuático Nacional; Referees: Queipo, Carlos Paipilla (COL)

13 October 2022; 19:20	Report	Colombia	10–6	Uruguay	Centro Acuático Nacional; Referees: Fernandes, Villanueva
13 October 2022; 19:20	Report	Score by quarters: 5–2, 1–0, 1–3, 3–1			Centro Acuático Nacional; Referees: Fernandes, Villanueva
13 October 2022; 19:20	Report	Muñoz 3	Goals	Domínguez 3	Centro Acuático Nacional; Referees: Fernandes, Villanueva

13 October 2022; 20:40	Report	Brazil	12–2	Paraguay	Centro Acuático Nacional; Referees: Rincón, Perré
13 October 2022; 20:40	Report	Score by quarters: 8–0, 2–0, 2–1, 0–1			Centro Acuático Nacional; Referees: Rincón, Perré
13 October 2022; 20:40	Report	Pedroso, Vizacre 3	Goals	Taboada, Núñez 1	Centro Acuático Nacional; Referees: Rincón, Perré

=== Knockout stage ===
The knockout stage consisted of the fifth place match (between the fifth and sixth placed teams of the preliminary stage), the semi-finals and the bronze and gold medal matches. The semi-finals match-ups were:

- Semifinal 1: Preliminary stage 1st placed team v Preliminary stage 4th placed team
- Semifinal 2: Preliminary stage 2nd placed team v Preliminary stage 3rd placed team

Winners of semi-finals played the gold medal match, while losers played the bronze medal match.

Semi-finals
14 October
Argentina	20
Chile	2
14 October
Brazil	17
Colombia	6

Gold medal match
15 October
Argentina	10 (2)
Brazil (pso)	10 (3)
Bronze medal match
15 October
Chile	6
Colombia	18

Fifth place match
14 October
Uruguay	15
Paraguay	2

==== Semi-finals ====
14 October 2022; 14:50	Report	Argentina	20–2	Chile	Centro Acuático Nacional; Referees: Monteiro, Daners
14 October 2022; 14:50	Report	Score by quarters: 5–1, 5–0, 4–0, 5–1			Centro Acuático Nacional; Referees: Monteiro, Daners
14 October 2022; 14:50	Report	Camnasio 5	Goals	Vera, Joaquín Díaz 1	Centro Acuático Nacional; Referees: Monteiro, Daners

14 October 2022; 16:10	Report	Brazil	17–6	Colombia	Centro Acuático Nacional; Referees: Perré, Queipo
14 October 2022; 16:10	Report	Score by quarters: 5–3, 2–0, 4–1, 6–2			Centro Acuático Nacional; Referees: Perré, Queipo
14 October 2022; 16:10	Report	Guimarães 4	Goals	Lizarazo 4	Centro Acuático Nacional; Referees: Perré, Queipo

==== Fifth place match ====
14 October 2022; 13:30	Report	Uruguay	15–2	Paraguay	Centro Acuático Nacional; Referees: Carlos Paipilla (COL), Villanueva
14 October 2022; 13:30	Report	Score by quarters: 3–1, 5–1, 2–0, 5–0			Centro Acuático Nacional; Referees: Carlos Paipilla (COL), Villanueva
14 October 2022; 13:30	Report	Domínguez 6	Goals	Cameron, Adorno 1	Centro Acuático Nacional; Referees: Carlos Paipilla (COL), Villanueva

==== Bronze medal match ====
15 October 2022; 11:20	Report	Chile	6–18	Colombia	Centro Acuático Nacional; Referees: Perré, Monteiro
15 October 2022; 11:20	Report	Score by quarters: 3–3, 1–5, 0–4, 2–6			Centro Acuático Nacional; Referees: Perré, Monteiro
15 October 2022; 11:20	Report	Sarmiento, Castro 2	Goals	Saldarriaga 5	Centro Acuático Nacional; Referees: Perré, Monteiro

==== Gold medal match ====
15 October 2022; 12:40	Report	Argentina	12–13 (PSO)	Brazil	Centro Acuático Nacional; Referees: García, Teixido
15 October 2022; 12:40	Report	Score by quarters: 3–3, 2–3, 2–3, 3–1 PSO: 2–3			Centro Acuático Nacional; Referees: García, Teixido
15 October 2022; 12:40	Report	Camnasio 4	Goals	Guimarães 7	Centro Acuático Nacional; Referees: García, Teixido

== Final ranking ==
Rank	Team
1st place, gold medalist(s)	Brazil
2nd place, silver medalist(s)	Argentina
3rd place, bronze medalist(s)	Colombia
4	Chile
5	Uruguay
6	Paraguay

2022 Men's South American Water Polo Champions

Brazil
First title

Team roster: Guilherme Barella, Bruno Chiappini, Felipe Henrique Gomes, Gustavo Coutinho, Beto Freitas, Marcos Pedroso, Luiz Octavio Scarabelim, Eduardo Cintra, Bernardo Rocha, Italo Vizacre, Gustavo Guimarães, Luis Ricardo Silva, Alexandre Souza Mendes
Head coach: Bárbaro Díaz

== Medalists ==
Gold	Silver	Bronze
Brazil Guilherme Barella (GK); Bruno Chiappini; Felipe Henrique Gomes; Gustavo Coutinho; Beto Freitas; Marcos Pedroso; Luiz Octavio Scarabelim; Eduardo Cintra; Bernardo Rocha; Italo Vizacre; Gustavo Guimarães; Luis Ricardo Silva; Alexandre Souza Mendes (GK) Head coach: Bárbaro Díaz	Argentina Octavio Salas (GK); Ramiro Veich; Tomás Galimberti; Tomás Tilatti; Emanuel López; Tomás Echenique; Guido Martino; Eduardo Bonomo; Exequiel Camnasio; Esteban Corsi; Augusto Antunes; Ignacio Setti; Nicolás Fernández (GK) Head coach: Juan Pablo Giri	Colombia Camilo Camacho (GK); Nelson Bejarano; José Manuel Rengifo; Juan Pablo Guapacha; Santiago Cuervo; Sebastián Muñoz; Santiago Aramburo; Jairo Lizarazo; Alejandro Saldarriaga; Felipe Mora; Enzo Salinas; Juan Felipe Echeverry; Tomás Gil (GK) Head coach: Ricardo Canal

== Qualified teams for Pan American Games ==
The following three teams from CONSANAT qualified for the 2023 Pan American Games men's water polo tournament, including Chile which qualified as hosts.

Team	Qualified on	Previous appearances in Pan American Games^{1}
Chile	4 November 2017	1 (1951)
Argentina	14 October 2022	13 (**1951**, **1955**, 1959, 1963, 1971, 1991, 1995, 1999, 2003, 2007, 2011, 2015, 2019)
Brazil	14 October 2022	17 (1951, 1955, 1959, **1963**, 1967, 1971, 1979, 1983, 1987, 1991, 1995, 1999, 2003, 2007, 2011, 2015, 2019)

^{1} Bold indicates champions for that year. Italic indicates hosts for that year.
