= Water polo at the 2015 Pan American Games – Men's team rosters =

Water polo at the
2015 Pan American Games
Tournament
men women
Rosters
men women

This article shows the rosters of all participating teams at the men's water polo tournament at the 2015 Pan American Games in Toronto. Rosters can have a maximum of 13 athletes.

== Argentina ==
The following is the Argentinian men's water polo squad.

- Tomas Bulgheroni
- Carlos Camnsaio
- Ivan Carabantes
- Esteban Corsi
- Julian Daszczyk
- Franco Demarchi
- Emanuel Lopez
- Diego Malnero
- Hernan Mazzini
- Andres Monutii
- Juan Montane Tobares
- Ramiro Veich
- German Yanez

== Brazil ==
Brazil announced their squad on April 16, 2015.

- Adrián Delgado
- Bernardo Gomes
- Bernardo Rocha
- Felipe Perrone
- Felipe Costa e Silva
- Guilherme Gomes
- Gustavo Guimarães
- Ives Alonso
- Jonas Crivella
- Josip Vrlić
- Paulo Salemi
- Thyê Bezerra
- Vinicius Antonelli

== Canada ==
Canada announced their squad on June 23, 2015.

- Dusan Aleksic
- Justin Boyd
- Nicolas Constantin-Bicari
- John Conway
- Kevin Graham
- Constantine Kudaba
- Jared McElroy
- Dusan Radojcic
- Robin Randall
- Scott Robinson
- Alec Taschereau
- George Torakis
- Oliver Vikalo

== Cuba ==
Cuba's team roster:

- Gianny Lara
- Rudy Despaigne
- Ernesto Cisneros
- Edgar Lara
- Ivey Arroyo
- Giraldo Carales
- Albert Guerra
- Remy De Armas
- Jose Peralta
- Raydel Carales
- Yohandry Andrade
- Raydel Martinez

== Ecuador ==
The following is the Ecuadorian men's water polo squad.

- Garret Kaltenbach
- Kevin Mindiola Reyes
- Edwin Carrera Mantilla
- Jose Pazmiño Yepez
- Troy Kaltenbach
- Andres Benitez Pazmiño
- Jeffrey Wheeler
- Carlos Heredia Viteri
- David Valle Villamarin
- Chandler Kaltenbach
- Gabriel Moran Plua
- Astolfo Rodriguez Loaiza
- Jean Castro Gonzalez

== Mexico ==
Mexico's team roster:

- Orlando Ortega
- Diego Marcado
- Jose Avalos
- Edgar O'Brien Jr
- Manuel Paniagua
- Pablo Carballo
- Oliver Alvarez
- Jose Serrano
- Armando Garcia
- Perseo Ponce
- Ever Resendiz
- Rodolfo Cervantes
- Alfredo De La Mora

== United States ==
The following is the United States men's water polo squad.

- Merrill Moses
- Nikola Vavic
- Alex Obert
- Jackson Kimbell
- Alex Roelse
- Luca Cupido
- Josh Samuels
- Tony Azevedo
- Alex Bowen
- Bret Bonanni
- Jesse Smith
- John Mann
- McQuin Baron

== Venezuela ==
Venezuela's team roster:

- Carlos Linares Suarez
- Joaquin Lopez
- Jean Sanchez Rangel
- Douglas Espinoza Castro
- Pedro Mujica Cardenas
- Carlos Fernandez Ramos
- Angel Rojas Borge
- Hugo Velazquez Briceño
- Antonio Pirela Ortiz
- Jonder Perdomo Duarte
- Moises Perez Ribas
- Pedro Gutierrez Benedetto
- Adrian Torres Granda
