= Water polo at the 2011 Summer Universiade – Men's tournament =

Water polo at the XXVI Summer Universiade

Medalists
1st place, gold medalist(s)		Serbia
2nd place, silver medalist(s)		Russia
3rd place, bronze medalist(s)		North Macedonia

The men's tournament of water polo at the 2011 Summer Universiade at Shenzhen, China began on August 11 and ended on August 23.

== Teams ==
Americas	Asia	Europe	Oceania
Brazil; United States	China; Japan; Singapore	France; Hungary; Italy; North Macedonia; Russia; Serbia; Spain; Turkey	Australia

== Preliminary round ==
Qualified for the quarterfinals

=== Group A ===
Team	Pld	W	D	L	GF	GA	GD	Pts
Spain	3	3	0	0	35	17	+18	6
China	3	2	0	1	34	32	+2	4
North Macedonia	3	1	0	2	27	25	+2	2
Turkey	3	0	0	3	16	38	−22	0

August 11, 2011; 11:00	Report	Spain	8–5	North Macedonia	Natatorium of Bao An District; Referees: Brasiliano (ITA), Stampalija (CRO)
August 11, 2011; 11:00	Report	Score by quarters: 1–2, 1–0, 2–0, 4–3			Natatorium of Bao An District; Referees: Brasiliano (ITA), Stampalija (CRO)
August 11, 2011; 11:00	Report	Carrillo Gemar 3	Goals	Kalinić 3	Natatorium of Bao An District; Referees: Brasiliano (ITA), Stampalija (CRO)

August 11, 2011; 17:40	Report	China	14–7	Turkey	Natatorium of Bao An District; Referees: Littlejohn (GBR), Varivodskiy (RUS)
August 11, 2011; 17:40	Report	Score by quarters: 4–1, 3–3, 5–1, 2–2			Natatorium of Bao An District; Referees: Littlejohn (GBR), Varivodskiy (RUS)
August 11, 2011; 17:40	Report	Pan 7	Goals	Gunkut 4	Natatorium of Bao An District; Referees: Littlejohn (GBR), Varivodskiy (RUS)

August 13, 2011; 15:20	Report	North Macedonia	12–6	Turkey	Natatorium of Bao An District; Referees: Mackay (USA), Werner (BRA)
August 13, 2011; 15:20	Report	Score by quarters: 4–1, 3–0, 4–3, 1–2			Natatorium of Bao An District; Referees: Mackay (USA), Werner (BRA)
August 13, 2011; 15:20	Report	Petrovikj 3	Goals	Beşkardeşler 3	Natatorium of Bao An District; Referees: Mackay (USA), Werner (BRA)

August 13, 2011; 16:40	Report	China	9–15	Spain	Natatorium of Bao An District; Referees: Bonnay (FRA), Shiosaki (JPN)
August 13, 2011; 16:40	Report	Score by quarters: 2–3, 2–6, 4–3, 1–3			Natatorium of Bao An District; Referees: Bonnay (FRA), Shiosaki (JPN)
August 13, 2011; 16:40	Report	Zhang C, Pan 2	Goals	Carrillo Gemar, Mallarach Guell 4	Natatorium of Bao An District; Referees: Bonnay (FRA), Shiosaki (JPN)

August 15, 2011; 14:00	Report	Spain	12–3	Turkey	Natatorium of Bao An District; Referees: Collantoni (ITA), Tan (SIN)
August 15, 2011; 14:00	Report	Score by quarters: 2–1, 3–0, 1–1, 6–1			Natatorium of Bao An District; Referees: Collantoni (ITA), Tan (SIN)
August 15, 2011; 14:00	Report	Cabanas Pegado 3	Goals	Gunkut, Balta, Sonmez 1	Natatorium of Bao An District; Referees: Collantoni (ITA), Tan (SIN)

August 15, 2011; 16:40	Report	China	11–10	North Macedonia	Natatorium of Bao An District; Referees: Peila (USA), Stavropoulos (GRE)
August 15, 2011; 16:40	Report	Score by quarters: 3–2, 3–2, 1–2, 4–4			Natatorium of Bao An District; Referees: Peila (USA), Stavropoulos (GRE)
August 15, 2011; 16:40	Report	Pan 4	Goals	Petrovikj 3	Natatorium of Bao An District; Referees: Peila (USA), Stavropoulos (GRE)

=== Group B ===
Team	Pld	W	D	L	GF	GA	GD	Pts
Russia	2	2	0	0	22	12	+10	4
Australia	2	1	0	1	16	14	+2	2
Brazil	2	0	0	2	13	25	−12	0

August 11, 2011; 12:20	Report	Australia	11–6	Brazil	Natatorium of Bao An District; Referees: Delon (FRA), Vogel (HUN)
August 11, 2011; 12:20	Report	Score by quarters: 2–2, 0–2, 6–0, 3–2			Natatorium of Bao An District; Referees: Delon (FRA), Vogel (HUN)
August 11, 2011; 12:20	Report	Hollis, Beadsworth, Roach, Cotterill 2	Goals	Reis 3	Natatorium of Bao An District; Referees: Delon (FRA), Vogel (HUN)

August 13, 2011; 10:00	Report	Australia	5–8	Russia	Natatorium of Bao An District; Referees: Stajkovikj (MKD), Stankevitch (USA)
August 13, 2011; 10:00	Report	Score by quarters: 0–2, 2–4, 2–0, 1–2			Natatorium of Bao An District; Referees: Stajkovikj (MKD), Stankevitch (USA)
August 13, 2011; 10:00	Report	five players 1	Goals	Ryzhov Alenichev, Khalturin 2	Natatorium of Bao An District; Referees: Stajkovikj (MKD), Stankevitch (USA)

August 15, 2011; 15:20	Report	Russia	14–7	Brazil	Natatorium of Bao An District; Referees: Bonnay (FRA), Callejas Perez (MEX)
August 15, 2011; 15:20	Report	Score by quarters: 3–0, 4–2, 3–2, 4–3			Natatorium of Bao An District; Referees: Bonnay (FRA), Callejas Perez (MEX)
August 15, 2011; 15:20	Report	Vishniakov 3	Goals	Vieira 2	Natatorium of Bao An District; Referees: Bonnay (FRA), Callejas Perez (MEX)

=== Group C ===
Team	Pld	W	D	L	GF	GA	GD	Pts
Serbia	3	2	0	1	39	11	+28	4
United States	3	2	0	1	30	16	+14	4
France	3	2	0	1	39	23	+16	4
Singapore	3	0	0	3	8	66	−58	0

August 11, 2011; 13:40	Report	Serbia	6–7	France	Natatorium of Bao An District; Referees: Stankevitch (USA), Stavropoulos (GRE)
August 11, 2011; 13:40	Report	Score by quarters: 0–0, 3–1, 3–4, 0–2			Natatorium of Bao An District; Referees: Stankevitch (USA), Stavropoulos (GRE)
August 11, 2011; 13:40	Report	Rašović 2	Goals	Simon 2	Natatorium of Bao An District; Referees: Stankevitch (USA), Stavropoulos (GRE)

August 11, 2011; 15:00	Report	United States	17–0	Singapore	Natatorium of Bao An District; Referees: Shiosaki (JPN), Sungu (TUR)
August 11, 2011; 15:00	Report	Score by quarters: 4–0, 4–0, 5–0, 4–0			Natatorium of Bao An District; Referees: Shiosaki (JPN), Sungu (TUR)
August 11, 2011; 15:00	Report	Wigo, Macdonell, Wright 3	Goals		Natatorium of Bao An District; Referees: Shiosaki (JPN), Sungu (TUR)

August 13, 2011; 11:20	Report	Singapore	6– 24	France	Natatorium of Bao An District; Referees: Callejas Perez (MEX), Shi (CHN)
August 13, 2011; 11:20	Report	Score by quarters: 1–6, 3–6, 2–8, 0–4			Natatorium of Bao An District; Referees: Callejas Perez (MEX), Shi (CHN)
August 13, 2011; 11:20	Report	Goh 3	Goals	Crousillat 9	Natatorium of Bao An District; Referees: Callejas Perez (MEX), Shi (CHN)

August 13, 2011; 12:40	Report	Serbia	8–2	United States	Natatorium of Bao An District; Referees: Stampalija (CRO), Sungu (TUR)
August 13, 2011; 12:40	Report	Score by quarters: 0–0, 4–0, 3–0, 1–2			Natatorium of Bao An District; Referees: Stampalija (CRO), Sungu (TUR)
August 13, 2011; 12:40	Report	Šaponjić, Petković 2	Goals	Wigo, Wright 1	Natatorium of Bao An District; Referees: Stampalija (CRO), Sungu (TUR)

August 15, 2011; 10:00	Report	Serbia	25–2	Singapore	Natatorium of Bao An District; Referees: Cao (CHN), Werner (BRA)
August 15, 2011; 10:00	Report	Score by quarters: 6–1, 7–0, 7–0, 5–1			Natatorium of Bao An District; Referees: Cao (CHN), Werner (BRA)
August 15, 2011; 10:00	Report	Ubovic 6	Goals	Lin 2	Natatorium of Bao An District; Referees: Cao (CHN), Werner (BRA)

August 15, 2011; 11:20	Report	United States	11–8	France	Natatorium of Bao An District; Referees: Gerzanich (RUS), Mackay (CAN)
August 15, 2011; 11:20	Report	Score by quarters: 2–3, 4–4, 5–1, 0–0			Natatorium of Bao An District; Referees: Gerzanich (RUS), Mackay (CAN)
August 15, 2011; 11:20	Report	Macdonell 4	Goals	Izdinsky 2	Natatorium of Bao An District; Referees: Gerzanich (RUS), Mackay (CAN)

=== Group D ===
Team	Pld	W	D	L	GF	GA	GD	Pts
Japan	2	2	0	0	24	20	+4	4
Italy	2	1	0	1	18	15	+3	2
Hungary	2	0	0	2	14	21	−7	0

August 11, 2011; 16:20	Report	Hungary	10–13	Japan	Natatorium of Bao An District; Referees: Bartels (AUS), Stajkovski (MKD)
August 11, 2011; 16:20	Report	Score by quarters: 1–4, 3–5, 3–1, 3–3			Natatorium of Bao An District; Referees: Bartels (AUS), Stajkovski (MKD)
August 11, 2011; 16:20	Report	Batori 5	Goals	Kadono 3	Natatorium of Bao An District; Referees: Bartels (AUS), Stajkovski (MKD)

August 13, 2011; 14:00	Report	Hungary	4–8	Italy	Natatorium of Bao An District; Referees: Stavropoulos (GRE), Teixido Bermudez (ESP)
August 13, 2011; 14:00	Report	Score by quarters: 0–1, 2–2, 2–3, 0–2			Natatorium of Bao An District; Referees: Stavropoulos (GRE), Teixido Bermudez (ESP)
August 13, 2011; 14:00	Report	four players 1	Goals	Pagani 3	Natatorium of Bao An District; Referees: Stavropoulos (GRE), Teixido Bermudez (ESP)

August 15, 2011; 12:40	Report	Italy	10–11	Japan	Natatorium of Bao An District; Referees: Hodgers (AUS), Stampalija (CRO)
August 15, 2011; 12:40	Report	Score by quarters: 3–2, 2–2, 2–4, 3–3			Natatorium of Bao An District; Referees: Hodgers (AUS), Stampalija (CRO)
August 15, 2011; 12:40	Report	Rizzo 4	Goals	Takei 3	Natatorium of Bao An District; Referees: Hodgers (AUS), Stampalija (CRO)

== Eightfinals ==
August 17, 2011; 10:30	Report	North Macedonia	13–12 (OT, PSO)	Australia	Natatorium of Bao An District; Referees: Delon (FRA), Peila (USA)
August 17, 2011; 10:30	Report	Score by quarters: 3–4, 1–1, 1–1, 2–1 OT: 2–2 PSO: 4–3			Natatorium of Bao An District; Referees: Delon (FRA), Peila (USA)
August 17, 2011; 10:30	Report	Randjikj 5	Goals	Cotterill 4	Natatorium of Bao An District; Referees: Delon (FRA), Peila (USA)

August 17, 2011; 12:00	Report	Russia	12–4	Turkey	Natatorium of Bao An District; Referees: Vogel (HUN), Bartels (AUS),
August 17, 2011; 12:00	Report	Score by quarters: 3–1, 5–3, 2–0, 2–0			Natatorium of Bao An District; Referees: Vogel (HUN), Bartels (AUS),
August 17, 2011; 12:00	Report	Vishniakov 3	Goals	Çağatay 2	Natatorium of Bao An District; Referees: Vogel (HUN), Bartels (AUS),

August 17, 2011; 13:30	Report	United States	8–7	Hungary	Natatorium of Bao An District; Referees: Stavropoulos (GRE), Collantoni (ITA)
August 17, 2011; 13:30	Report	Score by quarters: 0–2, 2–0, 4–1, 2–4			Natatorium of Bao An District; Referees: Stavropoulos (GRE), Collantoni (ITA)
August 17, 2011; 13:30	Report	Wigo 3	Goals	Vamos 3	Natatorium of Bao An District; Referees: Stavropoulos (GRE), Collantoni (ITA)

August 17, 2011; 15:00	Report	France	7–12	Italy	Natatorium of Bao An District; Referees: Stampalija (CRO), Teixido Bermudez (ESP)
August 17, 2011; 15:00	Report	Score by quarters: 1–2, 3–3, 0–2, 3–5			Natatorium of Bao An District; Referees: Stampalija (CRO), Teixido Bermudez (ESP)
August 17, 2011; 15:00	Report	Saudadier, Camarasa 2	Goals	Pagani 4	Natatorium of Bao An District; Referees: Stampalija (CRO), Teixido Bermudez (ESP)

August 17, 2011; 16:30	Report	China	6–5	Brazil	Natatorium of Bao An District; Referees: Brasiliano (ITA), Gerzanich (RUS)
August 17, 2011; 16:30	Report	Score by quarters: 3–0, 0–3, 1–1, 2–1			Natatorium of Bao An District; Referees: Brasiliano (ITA), Gerzanich (RUS)
August 17, 2011; 16:30	Report	Xie 3	Goals	Reis 2	Natatorium of Bao An District; Referees: Brasiliano (ITA), Gerzanich (RUS)

August 17, 2011; 18:00	Report	Japan	23–4	Singapore	Natatorium of Bao An District; Referees: Stajkovic (MKD), Littlejohn (GBR)
August 17, 2011; 18:00	Report	Score by quarters: 7–1, 5–0, 7–1, 4–2			Natatorium of Bao An District; Referees: Stajkovic (MKD), Littlejohn (GBR)
August 17, 2011; 18:00	Report	Takei 5	Goals	Goh 3	Natatorium of Bao An District; Referees: Stajkovic (MKD), Littlejohn (GBR)

== Quarterfinal round ==
=== Classification 9–14 places ===
August 18, 2011; 16:30	Report	Brazil	6–11	Hungary	Natatorium of Bao An District; Referees: Varivodskiy (RUS), Tan (SIN)
August 18, 2011; 16:30	Report	Score by quarters: 2–4, 0–2, 3–3, 1–2			Natatorium of Bao An District; Referees: Varivodskiy (RUS), Tan (SIN)
August 18, 2011; 16:30	Report	Franco, Vieira 2	Goals	Batori, Jansik 3	Natatorium of Bao An District; Referees: Varivodskiy (RUS), Tan (SIN)

August 18, 2011; 18:00	Report	Australia	10–12	France	Natatorium of Bao An District; Referees: Sungu (TUR), Brasiliano (ITA)
August 18, 2011; 18:00	Report	Score by quarters: 3–4, 3–2, 2–3, 2–3			Natatorium of Bao An District; Referees: Sungu (TUR), Brasiliano (ITA)
August 18, 2011; 18:00	Report	Cotterill 3	Goals	Khasz 3	Natatorium of Bao An District; Referees: Sungu (TUR), Brasiliano (ITA)

August 18, 2011; 16:30	Report	Turkey	18–5	Singapore	Natatorium of Bao An District; Referees: Hodgers (AUS), Cao (CHN)
August 18, 2011; 16:30	Report	Score by quarters: 4–1, 4–3, 8–0, 2–1			Natatorium of Bao An District; Referees: Hodgers (AUS), Cao (CHN)
August 18, 2011; 16:30	Report	Çağatay 6	Goals	Loh 3	Natatorium of Bao An District; Referees: Hodgers (AUS), Cao (CHN)

=== Quarterfinals ===
August 19, 2011; 15:30	Report	China	3–14	Serbia	Natatorium of Bao An District; Referees: Vogel (HUN), Mackay (CAN)
August 19, 2011; 15:30	Report	Score by quarters: 1–3, 1–3, 1–3, 0–5			Natatorium of Bao An District; Referees: Vogel (HUN), Mackay (CAN)
August 19, 2011; 15:30	Report	Zhang, Pan, Chen 1	Goals	Ubović 3	Natatorium of Bao An District; Referees: Vogel (HUN), Mackay (CAN)

August 19, 2011; 17:00	Report	North Macedonia	10–8	Japan	Natatorium of Bao An District; Referees: Sungu (TUR), Werner (BRA)
August 19, 2011; 17:00	Report	Score by quarters: 5–2, 0–4, 3–1, 2–1			Natatorium of Bao An District; Referees: Sungu (TUR), Werner (BRA)
August 19, 2011; 17:00	Report	Mišić 6	Goals	Wakamatsu, Takei, Okawa 2	Natatorium of Bao An District; Referees: Sungu (TUR), Werner (BRA)

August 19, 2011; 18:30	Report	Russia	9–8 (OT)	Italy	Natatorium of Bao An District; Referees: Stavropoulos (GRE), Callejas Perez (MEX)
August 19, 2011; 18:30	Report	Score by quarters: 2–1, 2–1, 4–1, 0–5 OT: 1–0			Natatorium of Bao An District; Referees: Stavropoulos (GRE), Callejas Perez (MEX)
August 19, 2011; 18:30	Report	Ryzhov Alenichev, Khalturin, Vishniakov 2	Goals	Rizzo 3	Natatorium of Bao An District; Referees: Stavropoulos (GRE), Callejas Perez (MEX)

August 19, 2011; 20:00	Report	Spain	9–10 (OT)	United States	Natatorium of Bao An District; Referees: Stampalija (CRO), Cao (CHN)
August 19, 2011; 20:00	Report	Score by quarters: 2–2, 3–3, 1–1, 2–2 OT: 1–2			Natatorium of Bao An District; Referees: Stampalija (CRO), Cao (CHN)
August 19, 2011; 20:00	Report	Carrillo Gemar 5	Goals	Wigo 3	Natatorium of Bao An District; Referees: Stampalija (CRO), Cao (CHN)

== Semifinal round ==
=== Classification 5–8 places ===
August 21, 2011; 15:30	Report	China	10–11 (OT)	Japan	Natatorium of Bao An District; Referees: Vogel (HUN), Tan (SIN)
August 21, 2011; 15:30	Report	Score by quarters: 2–4, 3–3, 3–1, 1–1 OT: 1–2			Natatorium of Bao An District; Referees: Vogel (HUN), Tan (SIN)
August 21, 2011; 15:30	Report	Zhang, Pan 3	Goals	Okawa 3	Natatorium of Bao An District; Referees: Vogel (HUN), Tan (SIN)

August 21, 2011; 17:00	Report	Italy	5–8	Spain	Natatorium of Bao An District; Referees: Varivodskiy (RUS), Stavropoulos (GRE)
August 21, 2011; 17:00	Report	Score by quarters: 1–1, 0–3, 0–2, 4–2			Natatorium of Bao An District; Referees: Varivodskiy (RUS), Stavropoulos (GRE)
August 21, 2011; 17:00	Report	Nora 2	Goals	Mallarach Guell, Cabanas Pegado 3	Natatorium of Bao An District; Referees: Varivodskiy (RUS), Stavropoulos (GRE)

=== Semifinals ===
August 21, 2011; 18:30	Report	Serbia	12–5	North Macedonia	Natatorium of Bao An District; Referees: Collantoni (ITA), Sungu (TUR)
August 21, 2011; 18:30	Report	Score by quarters: 3–1, 2–1, 5–2, 2–1			Natatorium of Bao An District; Referees: Collantoni (ITA), Sungu (TUR)
August 21, 2011; 18:30	Report	Šaponjić 5	Goals	Kalinić 2	Natatorium of Bao An District; Referees: Collantoni (ITA), Sungu (TUR)

August 21, 2011; 20:00	Report	Russia	11–10	United States	Natatorium of Bao An District; Referees: Stampalija (CRO), Bartels (AUS)
August 21, 2011; 20:00	Report	Score by quarters: 1–1, 6–3, 3–3, 1–3			Natatorium of Bao An District; Referees: Stampalija (CRO), Bartels (AUS)
August 21, 2011; 20:00	Report	Ryzhov Alenichev, Lisunov 3	Goals	Wigo 4	Natatorium of Bao An District; Referees: Stampalija (CRO), Bartels (AUS)

== Final round ==
=== Classification 12–14 places ===
Team	Pld	W	D	L	GF	GA	GD	Pts
Australia	2	2	0	0	37	8	+29	4
Brazil	2	1	0	1	31	17	+14	2
Singapore	2	0	0	2	7	50	−43	0

August 20, 2011; 18:00	Report	Brazil	6–12	Australia	Natatorium of Bao An District; Referees: Bonnay (FRA), Tan (SIN)
August 20, 2011; 18:00	Report	Score by quarters: 1–3, 1–0, 2–3, 2–6			Natatorium of Bao An District; Referees: Bonnay (FRA), Tan (SIN)
August 20, 2011; 18:00	Report	Reis 3	Goals	four players 2	Natatorium of Bao An District; Referees: Bonnay (FRA), Tan (SIN)

August 21, 2011; 12:30	Report	Australia	25–2	Singapore	Natatorium of Bao An District; Referees: Callejas Perez (MEX), MacKay (CAN)
August 21, 2011; 12:30	Report	Score by quarters: 8–0, 5–0, 6–1, 6–1			Natatorium of Bao An District; Referees: Callejas Perez (MEX), MacKay (CAN)
August 21, 2011; 12:30	Report	Woods 4	Goals	Lin 2	Natatorium of Bao An District; Referees: Callejas Perez (MEX), MacKay (CAN)

August 22, 2011; 15:30	Report	Brazil	25–5	Singapore	Natatorium of Bao An District; Referees: Stajkovikj (MKD), Gerzanich (RUS)
August 22, 2011; 15:30	Report	Score by quarters: 7–1, 7–1, 5–0, 6–3			Natatorium of Bao An District; Referees: Stajkovikj (MKD), Gerzanich (RUS)
August 22, 2011; 15:30	Report	Franco 6	Goals	Goh 3	Natatorium of Bao An District; Referees: Stajkovikj (MKD), Gerzanich (RUS)

=== Classification 9–11 places ===
Team	Pld	W	D	L	GF	GA	GD	Pts
Hungary	2	2	0	0	24	16	+8	4
France	2	0	1	1	20	22	−2	1
Turkey	2	0	1	1	16	22	−6	1

August 20, 2011; 19:30	Report	Hungary	12–10	France	Natatorium of Bao An District; Referees: Peila (USA), Varivodskiy (RUS)
August 20, 2011; 19:30	Report	Score by quarters: 2–1, 4–4, 4–3, 2–2			Natatorium of Bao An District; Referees: Peila (USA), Varivodskiy (RUS)
August 20, 2011; 19:30	Report	Vamos, Batori 3	Goals	Crousillat 4	Natatorium of Bao An District; Referees: Peila (USA), Varivodskiy (RUS)

August 21, 2011; 14:00	Report	France	10–10	Turkey	Natatorium of Bao An District; Referees: Gerzanich (RUS), Cao (CHN)
August 21, 2011; 14:00	Report	Score by quarters: 3–2, 5–2, 1–3, 1–3			Natatorium of Bao An District; Referees: Gerzanich (RUS), Cao (CHN)
August 21, 2011; 14:00	Report	Crousillat 3	Goals	Günkut 4	Natatorium of Bao An District; Referees: Gerzanich (RUS), Cao (CHN)

August 22, 2011; 17:00	Report	Hungary	12–6	Turkey	Natatorium of Bao An District; Referees: Callejas Perez (MEX), Shi (CHN)
August 22, 2011; 17:00	Report	Score by quarters: 3–1, 5–2, 3–1, 1–2			Natatorium of Bao An District; Referees: Callejas Perez (MEX), Shi (CHN)
August 22, 2011; 17:00	Report	four players 2	Goals	Beşkardeşler 3	Natatorium of Bao An District; Referees: Callejas Perez (MEX), Shi (CHN)

=== Final 7–8 places ===
August 22, 2011; 18:30	Report	China	8–17	Italy	Natatorium of Bao An District; Referees: Werner (BRA), Bonnay (FRA)
August 22, 2011; 18:30	Report	Score by quarters: 2–4, 1–6, 4–5, 1–2			Natatorium of Bao An District; Referees: Werner (BRA), Bonnay (FRA)
August 22, 2011; 18:30	Report	Li 3	Goals	Rizzo 5	Natatorium of Bao An District; Referees: Werner (BRA), Bonnay (FRA)

=== Final 5–6 places ===
August 22, 2011; 20:00	Report	Japan	9–8	Spain	Natatorium of Bao An District; Referees: Peila (USA), Mackay (CAN)
August 22, 2011; 20:00	Report	Score by quarters: 2–2, 3–2, 2–2, 2–2			Natatorium of Bao An District; Referees: Peila (USA), Mackay (CAN)
August 22, 2011; 20:00	Report	Takei 3	Goals	Carrillo Gemar 4	Natatorium of Bao An District; Referees: Peila (USA), Mackay (CAN)

=== Bronze medal match ===
August 23, 2011; 11:00	Report	North Macedonia	10–7	United States	Natatorium of Bao An District; Referees: Stavropoulos (GRE), Sungu (TUR)
August 23, 2011; 11:00	Report	Score by quarters: 4–1, 3–2, 1–1, 2–3			Natatorium of Bao An District; Referees: Stavropoulos (GRE), Sungu (TUR)
August 23, 2011; 11:00	Report	Mišić, Kalinić 3	Goals	Wigo, Lerman, Macdonell 2	Natatorium of Bao An District; Referees: Stavropoulos (GRE), Sungu (TUR)

=== Gold medal match ===
August 23, 2011; 12:30	Report	Serbia	11–8	Russia	Natatorium of Bao An District; Referees: Stampalija (CRO), Peila (USA)
August 23, 2011; 12:30	Report	Score by quarters: 2–1, 2–3, 5–0, 2–4			Natatorium of Bao An District; Referees: Stampalija (CRO), Peila (USA)
August 23, 2011; 12:30	Report	Petković 5	Goals	Novoksenov 2	Natatorium of Bao An District; Referees: Stampalija (CRO), Peila (USA)

== Final standings ==
Place	Team	Score
1st place, gold medalist(s)	Serbia	5–0–1
2nd place, silver medalist(s)	Russia	5–0–1
3rd place, bronze medalist(s)	North Macedonia	4–0–3
4	United States	4–0–3
5	Japan	5–0–1
6	Spain	4–0–2
7	Italy	3–0–3
8	China	3–0–4
9	Hungary	3–0–3
10	France	3–1–3
11	Turkey	1–1–5
12	Australia	3–0–3
13	Brazil	1–0–5
14	Singapore	0–0–7
