= Water polo at the 2004 Summer Olympics – Men's qualification =

The 2004 Men's Olympic Water Polo Qualifying Tournament was a tournament to decide the remaining three competing teams at the 2004 Summer Olympics in Athens, Greece.

== Teams ==
GROUP A

- Canada
- Croatia
- Germany
- Romania
- Poland
- Puerto Rico

GROUP B

- Argentina
- Brazil
- Netherlands
- Russia
- Slovakia

== Preliminary round ==
=== GROUP A ===
	Team	Points	G	W	D	L	GF	GA	Diff
1.	Croatia	10	5	5	0	0	48	14	+34
2.	Germany	7	5	3	1	1	34	13	+21
3.	Romania	7	5	3	1	1	38	18	+20
4.	Canada	4	5	2	0	3	29	37	–8
5.	Poland	2	5	1	0	4	15	36	–21
6.	Puerto Rico	0	5	0	0	3	12	58	–46

- January 25, 2004

Croatia	7 – 5	Romania
Canada	8 – 4	Poland
Germany	13 – 3	Puerto Rico

- January 26, 2004

Romania	9 – 3	Poland
Croatia	3 – 2	Germany
Puerto Rico	5 – 9	Canada

- January 27, 2004

Germany	2 – 2	Romania
Canada	4 – 12	Croatia
Poland	4 – 2	Puerto Rico

- January 28, 2004

Germany	8 – 3	Canada
Croatia	8 – 2	Poland
Romania	14 – 1	Puerto Rico

- January 29, 2004

Canada	5 – 8	Romania
Poland	2 – 9	Germany
Croatia	18 – 1	Puerto Rico

=== GROUP B ===
	Team	Points	G	W	D	L	GF	GA	Diff
1.	Russia	8	4	4	0	0	45	17	+28
2.	Slovakia	6	4	3	0	1	37	19	+18
3.	Netherlands	4	4	2	0	2	33	25	+8
4.	Brazil	2	4	1	0	3	17	20	–3
5.	Argentina	0	4	0	0	4	10	61	–51

- January 25, 2004

Russia	11 – 7	Slovakia
Brazil	9 – 2	Argentina

- January 26, 2004

Argentina	2 – 20	Slovakia
Netherlands	4 – 10	Russia

- January 27, 2004

Slovakia	7 – 6	Netherlands
Russia	7 – 3	Brazil

- January 28, 2004

Argentina	3 – 15	Netherlands
Brazil	0 – 3	Slovakia

- January 29, 2004

Russia	17 – 3	Argentina
Brazil	5 – 8	Netherlands

== Second round ==
- January 30, 2004

Puerto Rico	5 – 4	Argentina
Romania	8 – 5	Slovakia
Germany	6 – 3	Netherlands

== Third round ==
- January 31, 2004

Canada	11 – 2	Puerto Rico
Brazil	7 – 5	Poland
Croatia	12 – 0	Romania
Russia	8 – 9	Germany

== Finals ==
- February 1, 2004 — Ninth place

Puerto Rico	3 – 8	Poland

- February 1, 2004 — Seventh place

Canada	6 – 7	Brazil

- February 1, 2004 — Fifth place

Netherlands	6 – 5	Slovakia

- February 1, 2004 — Third place

Romania	4 – 8	Russia

- February 1, 2004 — First place

Croatia	6 – 1	Germany

== Final ranking ==
Rank	Team
1.	Croatia
2.	Germany
3.	Russia
4.	Romania
5.	Netherlands
6.	Slovakia
7.	Brazil
8.	Canada
9.	Poland
10.	Puerto Rico
11.	Argentina

- Croatia, Germany and Russia qualified for the 2004 Summer Olympics in Athens, Greece

== Individual awards ==
- Most Valuable Player
  - Igor Hinić (CRO)
- Best Goalkeeper
  - André Cordeiro (BRA)
- Best Scorer
  - Cosmin Radu (ROM) — 13 goals

== See also ==
- 2004 Women's Water Polo Olympic Qualifier
