= André Cordeiro =

André Cordeiro may refer to:

- André Cordeiro (water polo) (born 1967), water polo goalkeeper from Brazil
- André Cordeiro (swimmer) (born 1974), retired freestyle swimmer from Brazil
