= Alex Obert =

American Olympic water polo player

Personal information
- Full name: Alexander Obert
- Nickname: "OB"
- Born: December 18, 1991 (age 34) Placentia, California, U.S.
- Height: 6 ft 6 in (1.98 m)
- Weight: 225 lb (102 kg)

Sport
- Country: United States
- Sport: Water Polo
- Position: Center
- College team: Sierra College (2010-2011) University of the Pacific (2011-2016)
- Club: VK Jug
Medal record
Men's water polo
Representing the United States
Olympic Games
| Bronze medal – third place | 2024 Paris | Team |
Pan American Games
| Gold medal – first place | 2015 Toronto | Team |
| Gold medal – first place | 2019 Lima | Team |

Alexander Obert (/ˈoʊbərt/ OH-bərt; born December 18, 1991) is an American water polo player from Loomis, California. He was a part of Team USA at the 2016 Summer Olympics, where the team finished in tenth place. Obert plays Center and was the captain of Team USA. In 2025, was announced as the General Manager for the men's water polo team at University of the Pacific.

== Early life ==
Alexander Obert was born in Placentia, California, on December 18, 1991. He is the son of David and Kristin Obert. Alex Obert grew up in Loomis, California and attended Del Oro High School, where he excelled in water polo, basketball, and swimming. In water polo, he joined the varsity team as a sophomore and was a prep All-American as well as All-CIF First Team in the fall of 2009. He was also an All-American swimmer in both the 200 and 400 yard freestyle relay.

== College career ==
Obert attended Sierra College in Rocklin, California for one year and grey-shirted. Obert attended university at University of the Pacific, where he walked on as a member of the water polo team and ended up being a three-time All-American, and the third Pacific Tiger to be named a finalist for the Peter J. Cutino Award. Obert finished his Pacific career tied for ninth on the all-time scoring list with 157 goals. He graduated from Pacific in 2016 with a degree in engineering. He was teammates with Balázs Erdélyi and Ben Stevenson.

=== 2011 Freshman ===
In his first season at Pacific, Obert flashed tremendous potential in his role as a two-meter defender. Obert scored in the first three matches to start the season and played in all twenty-six matches. He finished his freshman year with eight goals, nine steals, three assists, thirteen drawn ejections, and four field blocks. He scored twice in the Tigers’ sudden death loss to University of California, Irvine at the Mountain Pacific Sports Federation Tournament.

=== 2012 Sophomore ===
Obert moved to the center position in his sophomore year at Pacific with the ability to be one of the nations top two-meter players. His status was cemented as he earned Second Team All-America honors from the ACWC after racking up fifty-one goals on the season and averaging 2.32 scores per game, ranking ninth in the conference. Obert recorded fifteen multi-goal scoring games despite missing three matches due to injury. He scored a career-high five goals in the Tigers' overtime upset win over then-No. 4 University of California, Berkeley at the Southern California Tournament. On October 5 against University of California, Davis, he would tie his career-high. He led the Tigers in scoring with ten goals at the MPSF Tournament and was named All-MPSF Second Team.

=== 2013 Junior ===
Obert earned Second Team All-America honors from the AWPCA after scoring forty-four goals in twenty-eight games, which ranked seventeenth in the MPSF. With Tomasevic and Obert both primary centers, Obert shuffled between a variety of different roles to allow both players to coexist in the pool simultaneously. He finished third on the squad in scoring, with 1.57 goals per game and posted scored a goal in all but four games. He tallied eleven multi-goal scoring games, including a season-high four goals against UC Davis. He scored two goals in the NCAA Semifinal win over Stanford, including the game-winner. He also earned MPSF All-Academic honors.

=== 2014 Senior ===
Obert redshirted the 2014 campaign to be eligible for the 2015 season. From August 19–24, he participated with the US Men's National Team over the summer of 2014 at the FINA World Cup in Almaty, Kazakhstan, where he scored six goals, helping the US to a fourth-place finish. From June 16–21, he also scored three goals for the US at the FINA World League Super Final in Dubai, UAE. He scored four goals, helping Team USA to gold at the 2014 FINA Intercontinental Tournament.

=== 2015 Redshirt Senior ===
Named a Peter J. Cutino Award Finalist while earning ACWPC First Team All-American, First Team All-MPSF honors & MPSF All-Academic accolades. Obert set career-highs with fifty-four goals scored, forty-four drawn exclusions and thirty-one steals. He also added ten assists. He finished tenth in MPSF in scoring with 1.93 goals per game. Obert scored in 27 of 28 games with a career-high eighteen multi-goal scoring games. Scored a season-high four goals against Cal Baptist (Sept. 25) and added seven other hat tricks. Posted hat tricks against #2 California (Nov. 7), #7 UC Irvine in the MPSF Tournament (Nov. 20) and #3 California in the MPSF Tournament (Nov. 21). Earned MPSF All-Tournament Team honors with eight goals in three games.

=== Post-college career ===
Obert was a member of Team USA in 2016 for the Olympics in Rio, the 2020 Olympics in Tokyo, and the 2024 Olympics in Paris. Team USA earned a bronze medal at the Paris Olympics.

In 2025, Obert became the first-ever General Manager of a college water polo team when it was announced he would become the General Manager for the University of Pacific team.

== Personal life ==
Obert's sister Isabelle played collegiate volleyball and basketball at Butler University.

Obert married Michele Relton, who he met at Pacific while she was on the women's water polo team. The two were married on August 25, 2018, in Granite Bay, California.
