= Water polo at the 2023 Pan American Games – Men's tournament =

Men's water polo tournament at the 2023 Pan American Games
- Venue: Aquatic Center
- Dates: October 30 – November 4
- Competitors: 96 from 8 nations

Medalists
Gold medal	United States
Silver medal	Brazil
Bronze medal	Argentina

The men's tournament of water polo at the 2023 Pan American Games in Santiago, Chile took place between October 30 and November 4 at the Aquatic Center in Santiago. The winner of the competition, the United States, qualified directly for the 2024 Summer Olympics in Paris, France.

== Schedule ==
The schedule is as follows.

Legend
G	Group stage	¼	Quarter-finals	½	Semi-finals	B	Bronze medal match	F	Gold medal match

Mon 30	Tue 31	Wed 1	Thu 2	Fri 3	Sat 4	
G	G	G	¼	½	B	F

== Qualification ==
A total of eight men's teams qualified to compete at the games. The host nation (Chile) qualified automatically, along with seven other teams in each tournament according to various criteria. Canada and the United States automatically qualified in each tournament, along with the top three teams at the 2023 Central American and Caribbean Games and top two teams at the 2022 South American Games.

Event	Dates	Location	Quota(s)	Qualified team
Host nation	—		1	Chile
Zone 3 (automatic qualification)	—		1	United States
Zone 4 (automatic qualification)	—		1	Canada
2022 South American Games	October 11–15	(Paraguay) Asunción	2	Brazil; Argentina
2023 Central American and Caribbean Games	July 1–7	(El Salvador) San Salvador	3	Puerto Rico; Cuba; Mexico
Total			8	

== Format ==
Teams are split into 2 round-robin groups of 4 teams each, where the final positions in each group will determine seedings for the knockout stage. The losing teams from the quarterfinals stage will compete in a separate single elimination bracket to determine fifth through eighth places in the final rankings.

== Preliminary round ==
All times are local (UTC−3).

=== Group A ===
Pos	Team	Pld	W	PSW	PSL	L	GF	GA	GD	Pts	Qualification
1	United States	3	3	0	0	0	82	18	+64	9	Quarterfinals
2	Brazil	3	2	0	0	1	46	39	+7	6	Quarterfinals
3	Puerto Rico	3	1	0	0	2	29	58	−29	3	Quarterfinals
4	Mexico	3	0	0	0	3	24	66	−42	0	Quarterfinals

Source: Santiago 2023
Rules for classification: 1) points; 2) head-to-head points; 3) head-to-head goal difference; 4) head-to-head number of goals scored; 5) goal difference.

30 October 2023; 15:00	Report	Brazil	18–5	Puerto Rico	Aquatic Center, Santiago; Referees: Hinds (NED)
30 October 2023; 15:00	Report	Score by quarters: 5–2, 3–2, 5–1, 5–0			Aquatic Center, Santiago; Referees: Hinds (NED)
30 October 2023; 15:00	Report	Coutinho, P. Real 4	Goals	Loubriel 2	Aquatic Center, Santiago; Referees: Hinds (NED)

30 October 2023; 18:00	Report	United States	30–2	Mexico	Aquatic Center, Santiago; Referees: Xavier Villanueva (CHI); Daniel Federico Daners (URU)
30 October 2023; 18:00	Report	Score by quarters: 10–0, 7–1, 7–0, 6–1			Aquatic Center, Santiago; Referees: Xavier Villanueva (CHI); Daniel Federico Daners (URU)
30 October 2023; 18:00	Report	R. Dodd 6	Goals	Mercado, Tavera 1	Aquatic Center, Santiago; Referees: Xavier Villanueva (CHI); Daniel Federico Daners (URU)

31 October 2023; 15:00	Report	United States	28–9	Puerto Rico	Aquatic Center, Santiago; Referees: Ernesto Hernández Toledo (CUB); Daniel Federico Daners (URU)
31 October 2023; 15:00	Report	Score by quarters: 8–3, 6–1, 6–3, 8–2			Aquatic Center, Santiago; Referees: Ernesto Hernández Toledo (CUB); Daniel Federico Daners (URU)
31 October 2023; 15:00	Report	R. Dodd 7	Goals	Loubriel 3	Aquatic Center, Santiago; Referees: Ernesto Hernández Toledo (CUB); Daniel Federico Daners (URU)

31 October 2023; 18:00	Report	Brazil	21–10	Mexico	Aquatic Center, Santiago; Referees: Garcia Soto (VEN); Rincón Patiño (COL)
31 October 2023; 18:00	Report	Score by quarters: 5–2, 5–3, 6–3, 5–2			Aquatic Center, Santiago; Referees: Garcia Soto (VEN); Rincón Patiño (COL)
31 October 2023; 18:00	Report	Guimarães, P. Real 5	Goals	Estrada 4	Aquatic Center, Santiago; Referees: Garcia Soto (VEN); Rincón Patiño (COL)

1 November 2023; 15:00	Report	Brazil	7–24	United States	Aquatic Center, Santiago; Referees: Mikhail Dykman (CAN); Frank Ohme (GER)
1 November 2023; 15:00	Report	Score by quarters: 2–5, 0–8, 2–5, 3–6			Aquatic Center, Santiago; Referees: Mikhail Dykman (CAN); Frank Ohme (GER)
1 November 2023; 15:00	Report	P. Real, R. Real 2	Goals	Daube 5	Aquatic Center, Santiago; Referees: Mikhail Dykman (CAN); Frank Ohme (GER)

1 November 2023; 18:00	Report	Puerto Rico	15–12	Mexico	Aquatic Center, Santiago; Referees: Jose Garcia Soto (VEN); German Moller (ARG)
1 November 2023; 18:00	Report	Score by quarters: 5–4, 5–6, 2–1, 3–1			Aquatic Center, Santiago; Referees: Jose Garcia Soto (VEN); German Moller (ARG)
1 November 2023; 18:00	Report	D. Zayas 4	Goals	Estrada 4	Aquatic Center, Santiago; Referees: Jose Garcia Soto (VEN); German Moller (ARG)

=== Group B ===
Pos	Team	Pld	W	PSW	PSL	L	GF	GA	GD	Pts	Qualification
1	Canada	3	3	0	0	0	71	18	+53	9	Quarterfinals
2	Argentina	3	2	0	0	1	43	21	+22	6	Quarterfinals
3	Cuba	3	1	0	0	2	24	58	−34	3	Quarterfinals
4	Chile (H)	3	0	0	0	3	16	57	−41	0	Quarterfinals

Source: Santiago 2023
Rules for classification: 1) points; 2) head-to-head points; 3) head-to-head goal difference; 4) head-to-head number of goals scored; 5) goal difference.
(H) Host

30 October 2023; 16:30	Report	Argentina	20–4	Cuba	Aquatic Center, Santiago; Referees: Gomez Portodomingo (ESP); Spiritosanto (USA)
30 October 2023; 16:30	Report	Score by quarters: 2–1, 6–2, 6–0, 6–1			Aquatic Center, Santiago; Referees: Gomez Portodomingo (ESP); Spiritosanto (USA)
30 October 2023; 16:30	Report	Corsi 6	Goals	Ponsa 4	Aquatic Center, Santiago; Referees: Gomez Portodomingo (ESP); Spiritosanto (USA)

30 October 2023; 19:30	Report	Canada	28–4	Chile	Aquatic Center, Santiago; Referees: Teodoro de Brito (BRA); Arellano Jr (MEX)
30 October 2023; 19:30	Report	Score by quarters: 7–0, 7–2, 9–0, 5–2			Aquatic Center, Santiago; Referees: Teodoro de Brito (BRA); Arellano Jr (MEX)
30 October 2023; 19:30	Report	Halajian 5	Goals	four players 1	Aquatic Center, Santiago; Referees: Teodoro de Brito (BRA); Arellano Jr (MEX)

31 October 2023; 16:30	Report	Canada	29–7	Cuba	Aquatic Center, Santiago; Referees: Ohme (GER); Moller (ARG)
31 October 2023; 16:30	Report	Score by quarters: 5–1, 8–3, 8–3, 8-0			Aquatic Center, Santiago; Referees: Ohme (GER); Moller (ARG)
31 October 2023; 16:30	Report	Constantin-Bicari, Côté 6	Goals	Ponsa 4	Aquatic Center, Santiago; Referees: Ohme (GER); Moller (ARG)

31 October 2023; 19:30	Report	Argentina	16–3	Chile	Aquatic Center, Santiago; Referees: Dabbaghian (USA); Castillo Torres (PUR)
31 October 2023; 19:30	Report	Score by quarters: 3–0, 4–1, 5–0, 4–2			Aquatic Center, Santiago; Referees: Dabbaghian (USA); Castillo Torres (PUR)
31 October 2023; 19:30	Report	Tilatti 4	Goals	three players 1	Aquatic Center, Santiago; Referees: Dabbaghian (USA); Castillo Torres (PUR)

1 November 2023; 16:30	Report	Argentina	7–14	Canada	Aquatic Center, Santiago; Referees: Harvey Hinds (CUW); David Gomez Pordomingo (ESP)
1 November 2023; 16:30	Report	Score by quarters: 3–4, 1–4, 1–3, 2–3			Aquatic Center, Santiago; Referees: Harvey Hinds (CUW); David Gomez Pordomingo (ESP)
1 November 2023; 16:30	Report	Veich 3	Goals	Constantin-Bicari 5	Aquatic Center, Santiago; Referees: Harvey Hinds (CUW); David Gomez Pordomingo (ESP)

1 November 2023; 19:30	Report	Cuba	13–9	Chile	Aquatic Center, Santiago; Referees: Jorge Rincon Patiño (COL); Yuri Machado (BRA)
1 November 2023; 19:30	Report	Score by quarters: 2–2, 3–4, 4–1, 4–1			Aquatic Center, Santiago; Referees: Jorge Rincon Patiño (COL); Yuri Machado (BRA)
1 November 2023; 19:30	Report	Ponsa 5	Goals	Cárcamo 4	Aquatic Center, Santiago; Referees: Jorge Rincon Patiño (COL); Yuri Machado (BRA)

== Final stage ==
=== Bracket ===
Quarterfinals
2 November
Brazil	16
Cuba	6
2 November
Mexico	5
Canada	20
2 November
Puerto Rico	9
Argentina	20
2 November
United States	28
Chile	2

Semifinals
3 November
Brazil	13
Canada	12
3 November
Argentina	7
United States	22

Gold medal match
4 November
Brazil	7
United States	17
Bronze medal match
4 November
Canada	10
Argentina	12

5–8th place semifinals
3 November
Cuba	11
Mexico	16
3 November
Puerto Rico	16
Chile	6

Fifth place
4 November
Mexico	9
Puerto Rico	13
Seventh place
4 November
Cuba (PSO)	7 (5)
Chile	7 (4)

=== Quarterfinals ===
2 November 2023; 15:00	Report	Brazil	16–6	Cuba	Aquatic Center, Santiago; Referees: David Gomez Pordomingo (ESP); Darren Brown Spritosanto (USA)
2 November 2023; 15:00	Report	Score by quarters: 3–1, 5–1, 4–3, 4–1			Aquatic Center, Santiago; Referees: David Gomez Pordomingo (ESP); Darren Brown Spritosanto (USA)
2 November 2023; 15:00	Report	P. Real 4	Goals	De Armas 3	Aquatic Center, Santiago; Referees: David Gomez Pordomingo (ESP); Darren Brown Spritosanto (USA)

2 November 2023; 16:30	Report	Puerto Rico	9–20	Argentina	Aquatic Center, Santiago; Referees: Mikhail Dykman (CAN); Frank Ohme (GER)
2 November 2023; 16:30	Report	Score by quarters: 2–4, 1–3, 3–7, 3–6			Aquatic Center, Santiago; Referees: Mikhail Dykman (CAN); Frank Ohme (GER)
2 November 2023; 16:30	Report	Bayo, F. Zayas 2	Goals	Camnasio 6	Aquatic Center, Santiago; Referees: Mikhail Dykman (CAN); Frank Ohme (GER)

2 November 2023; 18:00	Report	United States	28–2	Chile	Aquatic Center, Santiago; Referees: Agustin Pinski (ARG); Teodoro de Brito (BRA)
2 November 2023; 18:00	Report	Score by quarters: 4–0, 9–0, 4–1, 11–1			Aquatic Center, Santiago; Referees: Agustin Pinski (ARG); Teodoro de Brito (BRA)
2 November 2023; 18:00	Report	R. Dodd 8	Goals	Illino, Reginato 1	Aquatic Center, Santiago; Referees: Agustin Pinski (ARG); Teodoro de Brito (BRA)

2 November 2023; 19:30	Report	Mexico	5–20	Canada	Aquatic Center, Santiago; Referees: Germán Moller (ARG); Reynel Castillo (PUR)
2 November 2023; 19:30	Report	Score by quarters: 0–4, 3–7, 1–4, 1–5			Aquatic Center, Santiago; Referees: Germán Moller (ARG); Reynel Castillo (PUR)
2 November 2023; 19:30	Report	Estrada 3	Goals	Constantin-Bicari 5	Aquatic Center, Santiago; Referees: Germán Moller (ARG); Reynel Castillo (PUR)

=== 5–8th place semifinals ===
3 November 2023; 15:00	Report	Cuba	11–16	Mexico	Aquatic Center, Santiago; Referees: Jorge Agustin Pinski (ARG); Darren Brown Spiritosanto (USA)
3 November 2023; 15:00	Report	Score by quarters: 3–5, 3–4, 3–2, 2–5			Aquatic Center, Santiago; Referees: Jorge Agustin Pinski (ARG); Darren Brown Spiritosanto (USA)

3 November 2023; 16:30	Report	Puerto Rico	16–6	Chile	Aquatic Center, Santiago; Referees: Jose Garcia Soto (VEN); Fernando de Brito (BRA)
3 November 2023; 16:30	Report	Score by quarters: 6–1, 6–2, 3–0, 1–3			Aquatic Center, Santiago; Referees: Jose Garcia Soto (VEN); Fernando de Brito (BRA)

=== Semifinals ===
3 November 2023; 18:00	Report	Brazil	13–12	Canada	Aquatic Center, Santiago; Referees: Harvey Hinds (CUW); David Gomez Pordomingo (ESP)
3 November 2023; 18:00	Report	Score by quarters: 3–3, 2–3, 3–3, 5–3			Aquatic Center, Santiago; Referees: Harvey Hinds (CUW); David Gomez Pordomingo (ESP)
3 November 2023; 18:00	Report	Guimarães, P. Real 3	Goals	Constantin-Bicari, Patterson 3	Aquatic Center, Santiago; Referees: Harvey Hinds (CUW); David Gomez Pordomingo (ESP)

3 November 2023; 19:30	Report	Argentina	7–22	United States	Aquatic Center, Santiago; Referees: Gerardo Arellano Jr (MEX); Frank Ohme (GER)
3 November 2023; 19:30	Report	Score by quarters: 1–6, 0–4, 4–6, 6–6			Aquatic Center, Santiago; Referees: Gerardo Arellano Jr (MEX); Frank Ohme (GER)
3 November 2023; 19:30	Report	Galimberti 2	Goals	Irving 6	Aquatic Center, Santiago; Referees: Gerardo Arellano Jr (MEX); Frank Ohme (GER)

=== Seventh place game ===
4 November 2023; 16:00	Report	Cuba	12–11 (PSO)	Chile	Aquatic Center, Santiago; Referees: Yuri Machado (BRA); Reynel Castillo Torres (PUR)
4 November 2023; 16:00	Report	Score by quarters: 1–2, 0–2, 3–2, 3–1 PSO: 5–4			Aquatic Center, Santiago; Referees: Yuri Machado (BRA); Reynel Castillo Torres (PUR)

=== Fifth place game ===
4 November 2023; 17:30	Report	Mexico	9–13	Puerto Rico	Aquatic Center, Santiago; Referees: Danielle Dabbaghian (USA); Harvey Hinds (CUW)
4 November 2023; 17:30	Report	Score by quarters: 2–5, 4–2, 2–4, 1–2			Aquatic Center, Santiago; Referees: Danielle Dabbaghian (USA); Harvey Hinds (CUW)

=== Third place game ===
4 November 2023; 19:00	Report	Canada	10–12	Argentina	Aquatic Center, Santiago; Referees: David Gomez Pordomingo (ESP); Darren Spirtosanto (USA)
4 November 2023; 19:00	Report	Score by quarters: 2–3, 1–3, 3–2, 4–4			Aquatic Center, Santiago; Referees: David Gomez Pordomingo (ESP); Darren Spirtosanto (USA)
4 November 2023; 19:00	Report	four players 2	Goals	Camnasio 3	Aquatic Center, Santiago; Referees: David Gomez Pordomingo (ESP); Darren Spirtosanto (USA)

=== Final ===
4 November 2023; 20:30	Report	Brazil	7–17	United States	Aquatic Center, Santiago; Referees: Mikhail Dykman (CAN); Frank Ohme (GER)
4 November 2023; 20:30	Report	Score by quarters: 1–2, 2–6, 2–5, 2–4			Aquatic Center, Santiago; Referees: Mikhail Dykman (CAN); Frank Ohme (GER)
4 November 2023; 20:30	Report	three players 2	Goals	Bowen, Daube 5	Aquatic Center, Santiago; Referees: Mikhail Dykman (CAN); Frank Ohme (GER)

== Final standings ==
Rank	Team
1st place, gold medalist(s)	United States
2nd place, silver medalist(s)	Brazil
3rd place, bronze medalist(s)	Argentina
4	Canada
5	Puerto Rico
6	Mexico
7	Cuba
8	Chile

Qualified for the 2024 Summer Olympics
Qualified for the 2024 World Aquatics Championships
