= Bruno Nolasco =

Brazilian water polo player

Personal information
- Full name: Bruno Gonçalves Nolasco
- Born: May 4, 1986 (age 40) Rio de Janeiro, Brazil
Medal record
Men's water polo
Representing Brazil
Pan American Games SulAmérica games Six medals. 5x gold medals 1x bronze medal
Silver medal – second place	2007 Rio de Janeiro	Team

Bruno Gonçalves Nolasco (born May 4, 1986 in Rio de Janeiro) is a water polo player from Brazil. He began in 1997, defending the colors of Botafogo in football and regattas. He competed for his native country at the 2007 Pan American Games, where he claimed the silver medal with the Brazil men's national water polo team. He also won six South American senior championship medals, five golds and one bronze. two medals South American gold medalist in the junior team. He is a youth world champion, two-time youth games champion, multi national champion, and a multi regional champion.He was a member of the Brazilian national team for fifteen years, including the junior and youth teams. Coming from a poor family, he had many personal achievements, traveled the world serving his brand, had multiple exchange opportunities, with invitations from four of the great American universities where he was unable to join due to his financial condition at the time. Along with his brothers, he is the first generation in the family to have an academic training.
