= Luís Santos (water polo) =

Brazilian water polo player

Personal information
- Born: August 7, 1980 (age 45)
Medal record
Men's water polo
Representing Brazil
Pan American Games
| Silver medal – second place | 2007 Rio de Janeiro | Team |
| Bronze medal – third place | 2011 Guadalajara | Team |

Luis Maurício Capelache dos Santos (born August 7, 1980 in Santos) is a male water polo player from Brazil, who plays as a goalkeeper. He competed for his native country at the 2007 Pan American Games, where he claimed the silver medal with the Brazil men's national water polo team.
