= Daniel Mameri =

Brazilian water polo player (born 1972)

Personal information
- Full name: Daniel Polidoro Mameri
- Born: April 4, 1972 (age 54) São Paulo

Sport
- Club: Esporte Clube Pinheiros
Medal record
Men's water polo
Representing Brazil
Pan American Games
Silver medal – second place	2007 Rio de Janeiro	Team
Silver medal – second place	2003 Santo Domingo	Team
Silver medal – second place	1995 Mar Del Plata	Team
Bronze medal – third place	1991 Havana	Team
South American Championship
Gold medal – first place	2006 Medellín	Team
Gold medal – first place	2004 Mar del Plata	Team
Gold medal – first place	2002 Belém	Team

Daniel Polidoro Mameri (born April 4, 1972 in São Paulo) is a Pan American Games water polo player from Brazil.
