= Rodrigo dos Santos =

Brazilian water polo player

Personal information
- Born: September 18, 1981 (age 44)
Medal record
Men's water polo
Representing Brazil
Pan American Games
| Silver medal – second place | 2003 Santo Domingo | Team |
| Silver medal – second place | 2007 Rio de Janeiro | Team |

Rodrigo Prujanski dos Santos (born September 18, 1981 in Rio de Janeiro) is a water polo player from Brazil. Nicknamed Shalom he competed in two consecutive Pan American Games for his native country, starting in 2003. Dos Santos won two silver medals at this event with the Brazil men's national water polo team.
