= Water polo at the 2015 Pan American Games – Women's team rosters =

Water polo at the
2015 Pan American Games
Tournament
men women
Rosters
men women

This article shows the rosters of all participating teams at the women's water polo tournament at the 2015 Pan American Games in Toronto. Rosters can have a maximum of 13 athletes.

== Argentina ==
Argentina's team roster:

- Camila Bertaina
- Tatiana Canton
- Carla Comba
- Mariela de Virgilio
- Rocio de Virgilio
- Rocio Fesembeck
- Laura Font
- Dana Lea Gerschcovsky
- Federica Gomez de la Canal
- Ashley Hatcher
- Florencia Magraht
- Maria Olivieri
- Manuela Tamagnone Werbach

== Brazil ==
Brazil announced their squad on April 16, 2015.

- Catherine Oliveira
- Diana Abla
- Gabriela Dias
- Izabella Chiappini
- Lucianne Maia
- Luiza Carvalho
- Marina Zablith
- Marina Canetti
- Melani Dias
- Mirella Coutinho
- Tess Oliveira
- Victória Chamorro
- Viviane Bahia

== Canada ==
Canada announced their squad on May 28, 2015.

- Krystina Alogbo
- Joëlle Békhazi
- Carmen Eggens
- Monika Eggens
- Shae Fournier
- Jessica Gaudreault
- Jakie Kohli
- Katrina Monton
- Dominique Perreault
- Christine Robinson
- Stephanie Valin
- Claire Wright
- Emma Wright

== Cuba ==
Cuba's team roster:

- Mairelis Zunzunegui
- Dalia Grau
- Yeliana Bravo
- Thaimi Gonzalez
- Adriana Garlobo
- Mayelin Bernal
- Yanet Lopez
- Maviel Mendiola
- Dayana Morales
- Yordanka Pujol
- Cecilia Diaz
- Gertrudis Ortiz
- Arisney Ramos

== Mexico ==
Mexico's team roster:

- Adelina Alanis
- Alicione Murrieta
- Regina Ponce
- Edith Flores
- Marcela Rios
- Maria Torres
- Lorena Sanchez
- Diana Carballo
- Guadalupe Perez
- Ivana Castro
- Nydia Morales
- Carina Carballo
- Martha Espadas

== Puerto Rico ==
The following was the Puerto Rico women's water polo team for the 2015 Pan American Games.

- Angelik Alicea
- Nichole Colon
- Guarina Garcia
- Maria Gutierrez
- Carolin Matos
- Paola Medina
- Alejandra Ortiz
- Amanda Ortiz
- Cristina Ortiz
- Osmarie Quinones
- Anaid Ralat
- Perla Del Mar Roman
- Mairim Rosario

== United States ==
United States' team roster:

- Samantha Hill
- Madeline Musselman
- Melissa Seidemann
- Rachel Fattal
- Caroline Clark
- Margaret Steffens
- Courtney Mathewson
- Kiley Neushul
- Ashley Grossman
- Kaleigh Gilchrist
- Makenzie Fischer
- Kameryn Craig
- Ashleigh Johnson

== Venezuela ==
Venezuela's team roster:

- Lorena Godoy Nadales
- Nibley Piña Tovar
- Dulce Hernandez Cabrera
- Samantha Torres Granda
- Ana Balsero Riveros
- Marian Blanco Zambrano
- Rocio Galue Bolivar
- Franyelis Escalona Herrera
- Yineldy Araujo Marin
- Beatriz Escobar Abreu
- Orian Rolfo Coronel
- Jeisnaimil Agelvis
- Angela Calvo Marcano
