= Vicente Henriques =

Brazilian water polo player

Personal information
- Born: September 5, 1978 (age 47)
Medal record
Men's water polo
Representing Brazil
Pan American Games
Silver medal – second place	2003 Santo Domingo	Team
Silver medal – second place	2007 Rio de Janeiro	Team

Vicente Guida Berlanga Henriques (born September 5, 1978 in São Paulo) is a water polo player from Brazil. He competed in three consecutive Pan American Games for his native country, starting in 1999. Henriques won two silver medals at this event with the Brazil men's national water polo team.
