= André Raposo =

Brazilian water polo player

Personal information
- Nickname: Quito
- Born: February 10, 1978 (age 48) Rio de Janeiro, Brazil
Medal record
Men's water polo
Representing Brazil
Pan American Games
Silver medal – second place	2003 Santo Domingo	Team
Silver medal – second place	2007 Rio de Janeiro	Team

André Raposo (born February 10, 1978) is a water polo player from Brazil. Nicknamed Quito he competed in two consecutive Pan American Games for his native country, starting in 2003. Cordeiro won two silver medals at this event with the Brazil men's national water polo team.
