= Roberto Seabra =

Brazilian water polo player (born 1976)

Personal information
- Born: July 15, 1976 (age 49)
Medal record
Men's water polo
Representing Brazil
Pan American Games
Silver medal – second place	2003 Santo Domingo	Team
Silver medal – second place	2007 Rio de Janeiro	Team
South American Championships
Gold medal – first place	2004 Mar del Plata	Team

Roberto ("Beto") Suarez Seabra (born July 15, 1976 in Rio de Janeiro) is a water polo player from Brazil. He competed in three consecutive Pan American Games for his native country, starting in 1999. Seabra won two silver medals at this event with the Brazil men's national water polo team.
