= Lucas Vita =

Brazilian water polo player

Personal information
- Born: March 1, 1985 (age 41)
Medal record
Men's water polo
Representing Brazil
Pan American Games
Silver medal – second place	2007 Rio de Janeiro	Team

Lucas Pereira Vita (born March 1, 1985, in São Paulo) is a male water polo player from Brazil. He competed for his native country at the 2007 Pan American Games, where he claimed the silver medal with the Brazil men's national water polo team.
