= Leandro Ruiz Machado =

Brazilian water polo player

Personal information
- Born: February 22, 1977 (age 49)
Medal record
Men's water polo
Representing Brazil
Pan American Games
Silver medal – second place	2003 Santo Domingo	Team
Silver medal – second place	2007 Rio de Janeiro	Team

Leandro Ruiz Machado (born February 22, 1977, in São Paulo) is a water polo player from Brazil. Nicknamed Flipper he competed in three consecutive Pan American Games for his native country, starting in 1999. Machado won two silver medals at this event with the Brazil men's national water polo team. He participated in 4 world championships, 1998 (Perth-Australia), 2001 (Fukuoka-Japan), 2003 (Barcelona-Spain) and 2009 (Rome-Italy). In 2001 he participated in the University of Beijing-China. He was a 6-time South American champion (1998-2000-2002-2004-2006-2008).
