= Erik Seegerer =

Brazilian water polo player

Personal information
- Born: January 21, 1976 (age 50)

Sport
- Club: Esporte Clube Pinheiros
Medal record
Men's water polo
Representing Brazil
Pan American Games
Silver medal – second place	1995 Mar del Plata	Team
Silver medal – second place	2003 Santo Domingo	Team
Silver medal – second place	2007 Rio de Janeiro	Team
South American Championship
Gold medal – first place	2004 Mar del Plata	Team
Gold medal – first place	2006 Medellín	Team
Gold medal – first place	2008 São Paulo	Team

Erik Michael Seegerer (born January 21, 1976, in São Paulo) is a water polo player from Brazil. He competed in four consecutive Pan American Games for his native country, starting in 1995. Seegerer won three silver medals at this event with the Brazil men's national water polo team.
