= Water polo at the 1991 Pan American Games =

The Water Polo Tournament at the 1991 Pan American Games only had a men's competition in Havana, Cuba. The tournament was held from August 6 to August 13.

== Men's competition ==
=== Teams ===
GROUP A

- Argentina
- Canada
- Cuba
- Puerto Rico

GROUP B

- Brazil
- Jamaica
- Mexico
- United States

=== Preliminary round ===
==== GROUP A ====
| | Team | Points | G | W | D | L | GF | GA | Diff |
|---|---|---|---|---|---|---|---|---|---|
| 1. | United States | 6 | 3 | 3 | 0 | 0 | 35 | 12 | +23 |
| 2. | Brazil | 4 | 3 | 2 | 0 | 1 | 39 | 11 | +28 |
| 3. | Mexico | 2 | 3 | 1 | 0 | 2 | 35 | 17 | +18 |
| 4. | Jamaica | 0 | 3 | 0 | 0 | 3 | 5 | 74 | –69 |

- 1991-08-06

| Mexico | 29 – 1 | Jamaica |

- 1991-08-07

| United States | 10 – 3 | Brazil |

- 1991-08-08

| United States | 16 – 6 | Mexico |
| Jamaica | 1 – 36 | Brazil |

- 1991-08-10

| Jamaica | 3 – 9 | United States |
| Brazil | 13 – 9 | Mexico |

==== GROUP B ====
| | Team | Points | G | W | D | L | GF | GA | Diff |
|---|---|---|---|---|---|---|---|---|---|
| 1. | Cuba | 6 | 3 | 3 | 0 | 0 | 13 | 4 | +9 |
| 2. | Canada | 4 | 3 | 2 | 0 | 1 | 21 | 15 | +6 |
| 3. | Puerto Rico | 2 | 3 | 1 | 0 | 2 | 13 | 8 | +5 |
| 4. | Argentina | 0 | 3 | 0 | 0 | 3 | 12 | 30 | –18 |

- 1991-08-06

| Puerto Rico | 13 – 8 | Argentina |

- 1991-08-07

| Cuba | 13 – 4 | Canada |

- 1991-08-08

| Cuba | 13 – 4 | Argentina |
| Canada | 16 – 9 | Puerto Rico |

- 1991-08-10

| Cuba | 23 – 3 | Puerto Rico |
| Canada | 17 – 4 | Argentina |

=== Semi Final Round ===
- 1991-08-12 — 5th/8th place

| Mexico | 15 – 12 | Argentina |
| Puerto Rico | 24 – 4 | Jamaica |

- 1991-08-12 — 1st/4th place

| Brazil | 5 – 11 | Cuba |
| United States | 15 – 1 | Canada |

=== Final round ===
- 1991-08-13 — 7th place

| Argentina | 13 – 2 | Jamaica |

- 1991-08-13 — 5th place

| Mexico | 16 – 12 | Puerto Rico |

- 1991-08-13 — Bronze-medal match

| Brazil | 7 – 6 | Canada |

- 1991-08-13 — Gold-medal match

| Cuba | 8 – 5 | United States |

=== Final ranking ===
| RANK | TEAM |
|---|---|
| | Cuba |
| | United States |
| | Brazil |
| 4. | Canada |
| 5. | Mexico |
| 6. | Puerto Rico |
| 7. | Argentina |
| 8. | Jamaica |

1991 Men's Pan American champions

Cuba
First title
