= Water polo at the 1963 Pan American Games =

The Water polo tournament was contested for men only at the 1963 Pan American Games in São Paulo, Brazil. The top three teams from the event qualified through to the 1964 Summer Olympics in Tokyo, Japan.

== Competing teams ==
Five teams contested the event.

- Argentina
- Brazil
- Canada
- Mexico
- United States

== Format ==
Teams play in a round-robin format with the teams taking on each other twice. The team with the most points after eight matches would take the gold medal.

== Medalists ==
Event	Gold	Silver	Bronze
Men's water polo	Brazil (BRA); Adhemar Grijó Filho; Aladar Szabo; Flávio Ratto; Ivo Carotini; João Gonçalves Filho; Luiz Valim; Luiz Daniel; Luiz Eduardo Lima; Márvio dos Santos; Paulo Carotini	United States (USA); Charles Bittick; Gordon Hall; Kenneth Bathgate; Kent Taylor; Leslie Willeford; Martin Hull; Ned Melroy; Ronald Severa; Ronald Crawford; Ronald Volmer	Argentina (ARG)

== Results ==
=== Standings ===
Pos	Team	Pld	W	D	L	GF	GA	GD	Pts
1	Brazil	8	7	1	0	54	17	+37	15
2	United States	8	5	1	2	48	19	+29	11
3	Argentina	8	4	0	4	36	27	+9	8
4	Canada	8	2	0	6	22	53	−31	4
5	Mexico	8	1	0	7	16	60	−44	2

Source: Pan America Book, p.230-233

=== Matches ===
24 April 1963	Brazil	7–1	Mexico	São Paulo
24 April 1963	Score by quarters: 4–0, 1–0, 2–0, 0–1			São Paulo
24 April 1963	Filho 3	Goals		São Paulo

25 April 1963	Canada	5–4	Argentina	São Paulo

25 April 1963	United States	7–1	Mexico	São Paulo

25 April 1963	Brazil	8–1	Canada	São Paulo
25 April 1963	Filho 3	Goals		São Paulo

26 April 1963	United States	4–3	Argentina	São Paulo

26 April 1963	Mexico	6–3	Canada	São Paulo
26 April 1963	Score by quarters: 2–1, 1–1, 2–1, 1–1			São Paulo

27 April 1963	Brazil	8–0	Argentina	São Paulo
27 April 1963	Filho, Szabo 3	Goals		São Paulo

27 April 1963	United States	9–0	Canada	São Paulo

28 April 1963	Argentina	9–2	Mexico	São Paulo
28 April 1963	Score by quarters: 2–1, 3–0, 4–0, 0–1			São Paulo

28 April 1963	Brazil	6–4	United States	São Paulo
28 April 1963	Score by quarters: 1–1, 2–0, 2–0, 1–3			São Paulo
28 April 1963	Filho, Szabo 2	Goals		São Paulo

30 April 1963	Brazil	10–2	Mexico	São Paulo
30 April 1963	Szabo 7	Goals		São Paulo

30 April 1963	Argentina	10–2	Canada	São Paulo

1 May 1963	United States	14–1	Mexico	São Paulo

1 May 1963	Brazil	7–2	Canada	São Paulo

2 May 1963	Argentina	1–0	United States	São Paulo

2 May 1963	Canada	5–2	Mexico	São Paulo

3 May 1963	Brazil	5–4	Argentina	São Paulo
3 May 1963	Szabo 3	Goals		São Paulo

3 May 1963	United States	7–4	Canada	São Paulo

4 May 1963	Argentina	5–1	Mexico	São Paulo

4 May 1963	Brazil	3–3	United States	São Paulo
4 May 1963	Szabo 2	Goals	Willefor, Martin, Ronald	São Paulo
