= Water polo at the 1955 Pan American Games =

Water polo was contested for men only at the 1955 Pan American Games in Mexico City, Mexico.

== Competing teams ==
Five teams contested the event.

- Argentina
- Brazil
- Mexico
- Netherlands Antilles
- United States

== Medalists ==
Event	Gold	Silver	Bronze
Men's water polo	Argentina (ARG)	United States (USA)	Brazil (BRA); Adhemar Grijó Filho; Amaury Fonseca; Denir Ribeiro; Edson Perri; Eduardo Alijó; Everaldo Cruz; Hilton de Almeida; Márvio dos Santos; Roberto de Araújo; Rodney Bell; Rolf Kestener
