= Water polo at the 2019 Pan American Games – Men's tournament =

Men's water polo tournament at the 2019 Pan American Games
- Venue: Villa María del Triunfo cluster
- Dates: 4–10 August
- Competitors: 104 from 8 nations

The men's tournament of water polo at the 2019 Pan American Games in Lima, Peru took place between 4 and 10 August at the Villa María del Triunfo cluster. The winner of the competition qualifies directly for the 2020 Summer Olympics in Tokyo, Japan, while the second through fourth-place finishing teams qualified for the 2020 Men's Water Polo Olympic Qualification Tournament.

== Qualification ==
A total of eight men's teams and eight women's teams will qualify to compete at the games in each tournament. The host nation (Peru) qualified in each tournament, along with seven other teams in each tournament according to various criteria. Canada and the United States automatically qualified in each tournament, along with the top three teams at the 2018 Central American and Caribbean Games and top two teams at the 2018 South American Championships.

Event	Dates	Location	Vacancies	Qualified
Host Nation	—N/a	—N/a	1	Peru
Automatic qualification	—N/a	—N/a	2	Canada; United States
2018 Central American and Caribbean Games (CCCAN)	26 July – 2 August	(Colombia) Barranquilla	3	Cuba; Puerto Rico; Mexico
2018 South American Championships (CONSANAT)	31 October – 4 November	(Peru) Lima	2	Brazil; Argentina
Total			8	

== Format ==
Teams are split into 2 round-robin groups of 4 teams each, where the final positions in each group will determine seedings for the knockout stage. The losing teams from the quarterfinals stage will compete in a separate single elimination bracket to determine fifth through eighth places in the final rankings.

== Preliminary round ==
All times are local (UTC−5).

=== Group A ===
Pos	Team	Pld	W	D	L	GF	GA	GD	Pts	Qualification
1	United States	3	3	0	0	58	18	+40	6	Quarterfinals
2	Canada	3	2	0	1	51	31	+20	4	Quarterfinals
3	Cuba	3	1	0	2	27	49	−22	2	Quarterfinals
4	Puerto Rico	3	0	0	3	16	54	−38	0	Quarterfinals

Source: Lima 2019
Rules for classification: 1) points; 2) head-to-head points; 3) head-to-head goal difference; 4) head-to-head number of goals scored; 5) goal difference.

4 August 2019; 15:00	Report	Cuba	6–21	United States	Villa María del Truinfo Aquatic Centre, Lima; Referees: Arkadii Voevodin (RUS); Fabio Toffoli (BRA)
4 August 2019; 15:00	Report	Score by quarters: 1–6, 0–5, 5–4, 0–6			Villa María del Truinfo Aquatic Centre, Lima; Referees: Arkadii Voevodin (RUS); Fabio Toffoli (BRA)
4 August 2019; 15:00	Report	Carales, Ponsa 2	Goals	Bowen 5	Villa María del Truinfo Aquatic Centre, Lima; Referees: Arkadii Voevodin (RUS); Fabio Toffoli (BRA)

4 August 2019; 18:00	Report	Canada	20–7	Puerto Rico	Villa María del Truinfo Aquatic Centre, Lima; Referees: Marcus Gresele (BRA); Daniel Vázquez (MEX)
4 August 2019; 18:00	Report	Score by quarters: 4–0, 5–1, 7–2, 4–4			Villa María del Truinfo Aquatic Centre, Lima; Referees: Marcus Gresele (BRA); Daniel Vázquez (MEX)
4 August 2019; 18:00	Report	Constantin-Bicari 5	Goals	Loubriel 3	Villa María del Truinfo Aquatic Centre, Lima; Referees: Marcus Gresele (BRA); Daniel Vázquez (MEX)

5 August 2019; 15:00	Report	Canada	11–13	United States	Villa María del Truinfo Aquatic Centre, Lima; Referees: Boris Margeta (SLO); Arkadii Voevodin (RUS)
5 August 2019; 15:00	Report	Score by quarters: 3–4, 1–1, 4–6, 3–2			Villa María del Truinfo Aquatic Centre, Lima; Referees: Boris Margeta (SLO); Arkadii Voevodin (RUS)
5 August 2019; 15:00	Report	Côté 3	Goals	Hooper 5	Villa María del Truinfo Aquatic Centre, Lima; Referees: Boris Margeta (SLO); Arkadii Voevodin (RUS)

5 August 2019; 18:00	Report	Cuba	10–8	Puerto Rico	Villa María del Truinfo Aquatic Centre, Lima; Referees: Daniel Daners (URU); Fernando Varela (PER)
5 August 2019; 18:00	Report	Score by quarters: 3–3, 1–3, 3–1, 3–1			Villa María del Truinfo Aquatic Centre, Lima; Referees: Daniel Daners (URU); Fernando Varela (PER)
5 August 2019; 18:00	Report	Carales 4	Goals	Loubriel 2	Villa María del Truinfo Aquatic Centre, Lima; Referees: Daniel Daners (URU); Fernando Varela (PER)

6 August 2019; 15:00	Report	Cuba	11–20	Canada	Villa María del Truinfo Aquatic Centre, Lima; Referees: Gerardo Arellano (MEX); Boris Margeta (SLO)
6 August 2019; 15:00	Report	Score by quarters: 2–6, 3–5, 2–4, 4–5			Villa María del Truinfo Aquatic Centre, Lima; Referees: Gerardo Arellano (MEX); Boris Margeta (SLO)
6 August 2019; 15:00	Report	Carales, Contreras 3	Goals	Constantin-Bicari 6	Villa María del Truinfo Aquatic Centre, Lima; Referees: Gerardo Arellano (MEX); Boris Margeta (SLO)

6 August 2019; 18:00	Report	United States	24–1	Puerto Rico	Villa María del Truinfo Aquatic Centre, Lima; Referees: Diego Garibaldi (ARG); Daniel Vázquez (MEX)
6 August 2019; 18:00	Report	Score by quarters: 5–0, 5–0, 7–0, 7–1			Villa María del Truinfo Aquatic Centre, Lima; Referees: Diego Garibaldi (ARG); Daniel Vázquez (MEX)
6 August 2019; 18:00	Report	Daube, Vavic 5	Goals	Andino 1	Villa María del Truinfo Aquatic Centre, Lima; Referees: Diego Garibaldi (ARG); Daniel Vázquez (MEX)

=== Group B ===
Pos	Team	Pld	W	D	L	GF	GA	GD	Pts	Qualification
1	Brazil	3	3	0	0	36	14	+22	6	Quarterfinals
2	Argentina	3	2	0	1	32	29	+3	4	Quarterfinals
3	Mexico	3	1	0	2	30	31	−1	2	Quarterfinals
4	Peru (H)	3	0	0	3	16	40	−24	0	Quarterfinals

Source: Lima 2019
Rules for classification: 1) points; 2) head-to-head points; 3) head-to-head goal difference; 4) head-to-head number of goals scored; 5) goal difference.
(H) Hosts

4 August 2019; 16:30	Report	Peru	2–14	Brazil	Villa María del Triunfo Aquatic Centre, Lima; Referees: José Ortiz (PUR); Steven Rotsart (USA)
4 August 2019; 16:30	Report	Score by quarters: 0–3, 0–3, 1–5, 1–3			Villa María del Triunfo Aquatic Centre, Lima; Referees: José Ortiz (PUR); Steven Rotsart (USA)
4 August 2019; 16:30	Report	Alzamora, Villar 1	Goals	three players 3	Villa María del Triunfo Aquatic Centre, Lima; Referees: José Ortiz (PUR); Steven Rotsart (USA)

4 August 2019; 19:30	Report	Mexico	11–13	Argentina	Villa María del Triunfo Aquatic Centre, Lima; Referees: Marie-Claude Deslières (CAN); Boris Margeta (SLO)
4 August 2019; 19:30	Report	Score by quarters: 0–3, 3–6, 5–3, 3–1			Villa María del Triunfo Aquatic Centre, Lima; Referees: Marie-Claude Deslières (CAN); Boris Margeta (SLO)
4 August 2019; 19:30	Report	Juárez 3	Goals	Camnasio 5	Villa María del Triunfo Aquatic Centre, Lima; Referees: Marie-Claude Deslières (CAN); Boris Margeta (SLO)

5 August 2019; 16:30	Report	Mexico	5–10	Brazil	Villa María del Triunfo Aquatic Centre, Lima; Referees: Amber Drury (USA); Doriel Terpenka (CAN)
5 August 2019; 16:30	Report	Score by quarters: 0–2, 0–1, 4–3, 1–4			Villa María del Triunfo Aquatic Centre, Lima; Referees: Amber Drury (USA); Doriel Terpenka (CAN)
5 August 2019; 16:30	Report	Álvarez, Mercado 2	Goals	Guimarães 3	Villa María del Triunfo Aquatic Centre, Lima; Referees: Amber Drury (USA); Doriel Terpenka (CAN)

5 August 2019; 19:30	Report	Peru	6–12	Argentina	Villa María del Triunfo Aquatic Centre, Lima; Referees: Reinel Castillo (PUR); Steven Rotsart (USA)
5 August 2019; 19:30	Report	Score by quarters: 1–3, 2–2, 1–5, 2–2			Villa María del Triunfo Aquatic Centre, Lima; Referees: Reinel Castillo (PUR); Steven Rotsart (USA)
5 August 2019; 19:30	Report	Rodríguez, Villar 2	Goals	Yáñez 4	Villa María del Triunfo Aquatic Centre, Lima; Referees: Reinel Castillo (PUR); Steven Rotsart (USA)

6 August 2019; 16:30	Report	Peru	8–14	Mexico	Villa María del Triunfo Aquatic Centre, Lima; Referees: Yasmany Lima (CUB); Leonardo González (VEN)
6 August 2019; 16:30	Report	Score by quarters: 1–4, 0–3, 4–3, 3–4			Villa María del Triunfo Aquatic Centre, Lima; Referees: Yasmany Lima (CUB); Leonardo González (VEN)
6 August 2019; 16:30	Report	Villar 3	Goals	Álvarez 4	Villa María del Triunfo Aquatic Centre, Lima; Referees: Yasmany Lima (CUB); Leonardo González (VEN)

6 August 2019; 19:30	Report	Brazil	12–7	Argentina	Villa María del Triunfo Aquatic Centre, Lima; Referees: Arkadii Voevodin (RUS); Juan Menéndez (CUB)
6 August 2019; 19:30	Report	Score by quarters: 6–0, 1–1, 3–2, 2–4			Villa María del Triunfo Aquatic Centre, Lima; Referees: Arkadii Voevodin (RUS); Juan Menéndez (CUB)
6 August 2019; 19:30	Report	Guimarães 4	Goals	Camnasio, Carabantes 2	Villa María del Triunfo Aquatic Centre, Lima; Referees: Arkadii Voevodin (RUS); Juan Menéndez (CUB)

== Final stage ==
=== Bracket ===
Quarterfinals
8 August
Canada	13
Mexico	11
8 August
Puerto Rico	4
Brazil	15
8 August
Cuba	7
Argentina	9
8 August
United States	24
Peru	2

Semifinals
9 August
Canada	8
Brazil	7
9 August
Argentina	1
United States	17

Gold medal match
10 August
Canada	6
United States	18
Bronze medal match
10 August
Brazil	9
Argentina	6

5–8th place semifinals
9 August
Mexico	14
Puerto Rico (PSO)	15
9 August
Cuba	17
Peru	5

Fifth place
10 August
Puerto Rico	7
Cuba	8
Seventh place
10 August
Mexico	16
Peru	5

=== Quarterfinals ===
8 August 2019; 15:00	Report	Canada	13–11	Mexico	Villa María del Triunfo Aquatic Centre, Lima; Referees: Steven Rotsart (USA); Juan Menéndez (CUB)
8 August 2019; 15:00	Report	Score by quarters: 4–4, 3–4, 3–2, 3–1			Villa María del Triunfo Aquatic Centre, Lima; Referees: Steven Rotsart (USA); Juan Menéndez (CUB)
8 August 2019; 15:00	Report	Constantin-Bicari, D'Souza 4	Goals	Álvarez 5	Villa María del Triunfo Aquatic Centre, Lima; Referees: Steven Rotsart (USA); Juan Menéndez (CUB)

8 August 2019; 16:30	Report	Cuba	7–9	Argentina	Villa María del Triunfo Aquatic Centre, Lima; Referees: Boris Margeta (SLO); Daniel Vázquez (MEX)
8 August 2019; 16:30	Report	Score by quarters: 1–2, 2–3, 2–2, 2–2			Villa María del Triunfo Aquatic Centre, Lima; Referees: Boris Margeta (SLO); Daniel Vázquez (MEX)
8 August 2019; 16:30	Report	Carales 5	Goals	four players 2	Villa María del Triunfo Aquatic Centre, Lima; Referees: Boris Margeta (SLO); Daniel Vázquez (MEX)

8 August 2019; 18:00	Report	United States	24–2	Peru	Villa María del Triunfo Aquatic Centre, Lima; Referees: Daniel Daners (URU); Gerardo Arellano (MEX)
8 August 2019; 18:00	Report	Score by quarters: 4–0, 8–2, 6–0, 6–0			Villa María del Triunfo Aquatic Centre, Lima; Referees: Daniel Daners (URU); Gerardo Arellano (MEX)
8 August 2019; 18:00	Report	Bowen, Hallock 4	Goals	Alzamora, Villar 1	Villa María del Triunfo Aquatic Centre, Lima; Referees: Daniel Daners (URU); Gerardo Arellano (MEX)

8 August 2019; 19:30	Report	Puerto Rico	4–15	Brazil	Villa María del Triunfo Aquatic Centre, Lima; Referees: Fernando Varela (PER); Yasmany Lima (CUB)
8 August 2019; 19:30	Report	Score by quarters: 1–5, 1–4, 1–4, 1–2			Villa María del Triunfo Aquatic Centre, Lima; Referees: Fernando Varela (PER); Yasmany Lima (CUB)
8 August 2019; 19:30	Report	Andino 2	Goals	Guimarães 4	Villa María del Triunfo Aquatic Centre, Lima; Referees: Fernando Varela (PER); Yasmany Lima (CUB)

=== 5–8th place semifinals ===
9 August 2019; 15:00	Report	Mexico	14–15 (PSO)	Puerto Rico	Villa María del Triunfo Aquatic Centre, Lima; Referees: Fabio Toffoli (BRA); Doriel Terpenka (CAN)
9 August 2019; 15:00	Report	Score by quarters: 4–5, 5–5, 1–2, 3–1 PSO: 1–2			Villa María del Triunfo Aquatic Centre, Lima; Referees: Fabio Toffoli (BRA); Doriel Terpenka (CAN)
9 August 2019; 15:00	Report	Velázquez 4	Goals	five players 2	Villa María del Triunfo Aquatic Centre, Lima; Referees: Fabio Toffoli (BRA); Doriel Terpenka (CAN)

9 August 2019; 16:30	Report	Cuba	17–5	Peru	Villa María del Triunfo Aquatic Centre, Lima; Referees: Steven Rotsart (USA); Marcus Gresele (BRA)
9 August 2019; 16:30	Report	Score by quarters: 5–1, 0–0, 5–1, 7–3			Villa María del Triunfo Aquatic Centre, Lima; Referees: Steven Rotsart (USA); Marcus Gresele (BRA)
9 August 2019; 16:30	Report	Carales 8	Goals	Otero, Villar 2	Villa María del Triunfo Aquatic Centre, Lima; Referees: Steven Rotsart (USA); Marcus Gresele (BRA)

=== Semifinals ===
9 August 2019; 18:00	Report	Canada	8–7	Brazil	Villa María del Triunfo Aquatic Centre, Lima; Referees: Boris Margeta (SLO); Reinel Castillo (PUR)
9 August 2019; 18:00	Report	Score by quarters: 3–1, 0–0, 1–3, 4–3			Villa María del Triunfo Aquatic Centre, Lima; Referees: Boris Margeta (SLO); Reinel Castillo (PUR)
9 August 2019; 18:00	Report	Constantin-Bicari, Côté 2	Goals	Coutinho, Guimarães 2	Villa María del Triunfo Aquatic Centre, Lima; Referees: Boris Margeta (SLO); Reinel Castillo (PUR)

9 August 2019; 19:30	Report	Argentina	1–17	United States	Villa María del Triunfo Aquatic Centre, Lima; Referees: Gerardo Arellano (MEX); Leonardo González (VEN)
9 August 2019; 19:30	Report	Score by quarters: 0–4, 0–4, 1–6, 0–3			Villa María del Triunfo Aquatic Centre, Lima; Referees: Gerardo Arellano (MEX); Leonardo González (VEN)
9 August 2019; 19:30	Report	Camnasio 1	Goals	Hooper 7	Villa María del Triunfo Aquatic Centre, Lima; Referees: Gerardo Arellano (MEX); Leonardo González (VEN)

=== Seventh place game ===
10 August 2019; 15:00	Report	Mexico	16–5	Peru	Villa María del Triunfo Aquatic Centre, Lima; Referees: Yasmany Lima (CUB); Reinel Castillo (PUR)
10 August 2019; 15:00	Report	Score by quarters: 4–0, 4–0, 5–3, 3–2			Villa María del Triunfo Aquatic Centre, Lima; Referees: Yasmany Lima (CUB); Reinel Castillo (PUR)
10 August 2019; 15:00	Report	Álvarez 8	Goals	five players 1	Villa María del Triunfo Aquatic Centre, Lima; Referees: Yasmany Lima (CUB); Reinel Castillo (PUR)

=== Fifth place game ===
10 August 2019; 16:30	Report	Puerto Rico	7–8	Cuba	Villa María del Triunfo Aquatic Centre, Lima; Referees: Doriel Terpenka (CAN); Diego Garibaldi (ARG)
10 August 2019; 16:30	Report	Score by quarters: 2–3, 2–3, 1–1, 2–1			Villa María del Triunfo Aquatic Centre, Lima; Referees: Doriel Terpenka (CAN); Diego Garibaldi (ARG)
10 August 2019; 16:30	Report	Loubriel 3	Goals	Carales 5	Villa María del Triunfo Aquatic Centre, Lima; Referees: Doriel Terpenka (CAN); Diego Garibaldi (ARG)

=== Third place game ===
10 August 2019; 18:00	Report	(bronze) Brazil	9–6	Argentina	Villa María del Triunfo Aquatic Centre, Lima; Referees: Steven Rotsart (USA); Juan Menéndez (CUB)
10 August 2019; 18:00	Report	Score by quarters: 2–1, 2–0, 2–2, 3–3			Villa María del Triunfo Aquatic Centre, Lima; Referees: Steven Rotsart (USA); Juan Menéndez (CUB)
10 August 2019; 18:00	Report	P. Real, R. Real 2	Goals	Echenique 2	Villa María del Triunfo Aquatic Centre, Lima; Referees: Steven Rotsart (USA); Juan Menéndez (CUB)

=== Final ===
10 August 2019; 19:30	Report	(silver) Canada	6–18	United States (gold)	Villa María del Triunfo Aquatic Centre, Lima; Referees: Boris Margeta (SLO); Arkadii Voevodin (RUS)
10 August 2019; 19:30	Report	Score by quarters: 1–4, 1–6, 1–2, 3–6			Villa María del Triunfo Aquatic Centre, Lima; Referees: Boris Margeta (SLO); Arkadii Voevodin (RUS)
10 August 2019; 19:30	Report	Gardijan 2	Goals	three players 5	Villa María del Triunfo Aquatic Centre, Lima; Referees: Boris Margeta (SLO); Arkadii Voevodin (RUS)

== Final standings ==
Rank	Team	Olympic Qualification
1st place, gold medalist(s)	United States	Qualifies directly for 2020 Olympic Games
2nd place, silver medalist(s)	Canada	
3rd place, bronze medalist(s)	Brazil	
4	Argentina	
5	Cuba	
6	Puerto Rico	
7	Mexico	
8	Peru	
