= Water polo at the 2015 Pan American Games – Men's tournament =

Men's water polo tournament at the 2015 Pan American Games
- Venue: Markham Pan Am Centre
- Dates: July 7–15
- Competitors: 104 from 8 nations

Medalists
Gold medal	United States
Silver medal	Brazil
Bronze medal	Canada

Water polo at the
2015 Pan American Games
Tournament
men women
Rosters
men women

The men's tournament of water polo at the 2015 Pan American Games in Toronto, Canada took place between the 7 and 15 of July at the Markham Pan Am Centre in Markham, Ontario. The winner of the competition qualified directly for the 2016 Summer Olympics in Rio de Janeiro, Brazil, while the second through fourth-place finishing teams qualified for the 2016 Men's Water Polo Olympic Games Qualification Tournament to be held in Florence, Italy.

== Qualification ==
A National Olympic Committee may enter one men's team for the water polo competition. Canada, the host nation along with seven other countries qualified through regional competitions.

Event	Date	Location	Vacancies	Qualified
Host Nation	—N/a	—N/a	1	Canada
Qualified automatically	—N/a	—N/a	1	United States
2014 South American Championship	October 7–11	(Argentina) Mar del Plata	3	Brazil; Argentina; Venezuela
2014 Central American and Caribbean Games	November 22–29	(Mexico) Veracruz	~~3~~ 2	Cuba; Mexico; ~~Puerto Rico~~
Reallocation	—N/a		1	Ecuador
TOTAL			8	

- For unknown reasons, Puerto Rico withdrew from the tournament and was replaced with Ecuador.

== Format ==
- Eight teams are split into two preliminary round groups of four teams each. The top two teams from each group qualify for the knockout stage.
- The third and fourth placed each group will crossover and play each other in the fifth to eighth place bracket.
- In the semifinals, the matchups are as follows: A1 vs. B2 and B1 vs. A2
- The winning teams from the semifinals play for the gold medal. The losing teams compete for the bronze medal.

== Preliminary round ==
All times are local Eastern Daylight Time (UTC−5)

=== Group A ===
Team	Pld	W	D	L	GF	GA	GD	Pts	Qualification
United States	3	3	0	0	62	7	+55	6	Qualified for the semifinals
Argentina	3	1	1	1	31	29	+2	3	Qualified for the semifinals
Cuba	3	1	1	1	21	31	−10	3	
Ecuador	3	0	0	3	11	58	−47	0	

7 July 2015; 20:08	Report	United States	27–0	Ecuador	Markham Pan Am Centre; Referees: William Mackay (CAN), Edmundo Rodriguez (BRA)
7 July 2015; 20:08	Report	Score by quarters: 5–0, 8–0, 5–0, 9–0			Markham Pan Am Centre; Referees: William Mackay (CAN), Edmundo Rodriguez (BRA)
7 July 2015; 20:08	Report	Bonanni 9	Goals		Markham Pan Am Centre; Referees: William Mackay (CAN), Edmundo Rodriguez (BRA)

8 July 2015; 16:08	Report	Ecuador	8–21	Argentina	Markham Pan Am Centre; Referees: Daniel Vazquez (MEX), Thomas Molnar (HUN)
8 July 2015; 16:08	Report	Score by quarters: 4–5, 1–6, 0–2, 3–8			Markham Pan Am Centre; Referees: Daniel Vazquez (MEX), Thomas Molnar (HUN)
8 July 2015; 16:08	Report	Kaltenbach, Kaltenbach 3	Goals	Veich 5, Yanez 4, Damarchi 3, Carabantes 3, Corsi 2, Lopez 2, Monutti 2	Markham Pan Am Centre; Referees: Daniel Vazquez (MEX), Thomas Molnar (HUN)

8 July 2015; 18:08	Report	United States	21–4	Cuba	Markham Pan Am Centre; Referees: Jaume Teixido (ESP), Stephane Roy (CAN)
8 July 2015; 18:08	Report	Score by quarters: 6–2, 3–0, 6–1, 6–1			Markham Pan Am Centre; Referees: Jaume Teixido (ESP), Stephane Roy (CAN)
8 July 2015; 18:08	Report	Samuels 4	Goals	4 players 1	Markham Pan Am Centre; Referees: Jaume Teixido (ESP), Stephane Roy (CAN)

9 July 2015; 20:08	Report	Cuba	7–7	Argentina	Markham Pan Am Centre; Referees: William Mackay (CAN), Hugo Paredes (VEN).
9 July 2015; 20:08	Report	Score by quarters: 0-3, 1-1, 4-2, 2-1			Markham Pan Am Centre; Referees: William Mackay (CAN), Hugo Paredes (VEN).
9 July 2015; 20:08	Report	2 players 1	Goals	Demarchi 3, Carabantes 2, Corsi 1, Yanez 1	Markham Pan Am Centre; Referees: William Mackay (CAN), Hugo Paredes (VEN).

11 July 2015; 16:08	Report	United States	14–3	Argentina	Markham Pan Am Centre; Referees: Arnoldo Zambrano (VEN), Stéphane Roy (CAN)
11 July 2015; 16:08	Report	Score by quarters: 3-1, 3-0, 4-1, 4-1			Markham Pan Am Centre; Referees: Arnoldo Zambrano (VEN), Stéphane Roy (CAN)
11 July 2015; 16:08	Report	Azevedo 4	Goals	Veich 2, Carabantes 1	Markham Pan Am Centre; Referees: Arnoldo Zambrano (VEN), Stéphane Roy (CAN)

11 July 2015; 20:08	Report	Ecuador	3–10	Cuba	Markham Pan Am Centre; Referees: Joao Cardenuto (BRA), Claudia Aguilar (MEX)
11 July 2015; 20:08	Report	Score by quarters: 1-3, 0-2, 0-2, 2-3			Markham Pan Am Centre; Referees: Joao Cardenuto (BRA), Claudia Aguilar (MEX)
11 July 2015; 20:08	Report	Kaltenbach 2	Goals	Carales 3	Markham Pan Am Centre; Referees: Joao Cardenuto (BRA), Claudia Aguilar (MEX)

=== Group B ===
Team	Pld	W	D	L	GF	GA	GD	Pts	Qualification
Brazil	3	3	0	0	55	20	+35	6	Qualified for the semifinals
Canada	3	2	0	1	44	22	+22	4	Qualified for the semifinals
Mexico	3	0	1	2	27	50	−23	1	
Venezuela	3	0	1	2	13	47	−34	1	

7 July 2015; 16:08	Report	Venezuela	9–9	Mexico	Markham Pan Am Centre; Referees: Mark Maretzki (USA), Reynel Castillo (PUR)
7 July 2015; 16:08	Report	Score by quarters: 3–1, 1–4, 3–2, 2–2			Markham Pan Am Centre; Referees: Mark Maretzki (USA), Reynel Castillo (PUR)
7 July 2015; 16:08	Report	Borges 3	Goals	Ponce 3	Markham Pan Am Centre; Referees: Mark Maretzki (USA), Reynel Castillo (PUR)

7 July 2015; 18:08	Report	Canada	9–11	Brazil	Markham Pan Am Centre; Referees: Thomas Molnae (HUN), Jaume Teixeira (ESP)
7 July 2015; 18:08	Report	Score by quarters: 2–4, 4–3, 1–4, 2–0			Markham Pan Am Centre; Referees: Thomas Molnae (HUN), Jaume Teixeira (ESP)
7 July 2015; 18:08	Report	Conway 3, Boyd 2	Goals	Perrone 3	Markham Pan Am Centre; Referees: Thomas Molnae (HUN), Jaume Teixeira (ESP)

8 July 2015; 20:08	Report	Venezuela	2–22	Brazil	Markham Pan Am Centre; Referees: Humberto Navarro (USA), Diego Garibaldi (ARG)
8 July 2015; 20:08	Report	Score by quarters: 0–6, 1–6, 0–3, 1–7			Markham Pan Am Centre; Referees: Humberto Navarro (USA), Diego Garibaldi (ARG)
8 July 2015; 20:08	Report	Cardenas, Ramos 1	Goals	Perrone 4	Markham Pan Am Centre; Referees: Humberto Navarro (USA), Diego Garibaldi (ARG)

9 July 2015; 16:08	Report	Brazil	22–9	Mexico	Markham Pan Am Centre; Referees: Mark Maretzki (USA), Guillermo Grgicevic (ARG)
9 July 2015; 16:08	Report	Score by quarters: 3–3, 7–1, 4–2, 8–3			Markham Pan Am Centre; Referees: Mark Maretzki (USA), Guillermo Grgicevic (ARG)
9 July 2015; 16:08	Report	Gomes 7	Goals	Ponce 3	Markham Pan Am Centre; Referees: Mark Maretzki (USA), Guillermo Grgicevic (ARG)

9 July 2015; 18:08	Report	Venezuela	2–16	Canada	Markham Pan Am Centre; Referees: Jaume Teixido (SPA), Reynel Castillo (PUR)
9 July 2015; 18:08	Report	Score by quarters: 0-5, 1-3, 1-5, 0-3			Markham Pan Am Centre; Referees: Jaume Teixido (SPA), Reynel Castillo (PUR)
9 July 2015; 18:08	Report	2 players 1	Goals	Boyd, Graham 5, Bicari, Kudaba 2	Markham Pan Am Centre; Referees: Jaume Teixido (SPA), Reynel Castillo (PUR)

11 July 2015; 18:08	Report	Mexico	9–19	Canada	Markham Pan Am Centre; Referees: Humberto Navarro (USA), Thomas Mulnar (HUN)
11 July 2015; 18:08	Report	Score by quarters: 0-2, 3-5, 3-5, 3-7			Markham Pan Am Centre; Referees: Humberto Navarro (USA), Thomas Mulnar (HUN)
11 July 2015; 18:08	Report	Alvarez 2	Goals	Boyd 5, Mcelroy Conway Bicari 3	Markham Pan Am Centre; Referees: Humberto Navarro (USA), Thomas Mulnar (HUN)

== Classification stage ==
=== Bracket ===
Semi-finals
July 13
Venezuela	9
Cuba	8
July 13
Mexico	17
Ecuador	7

Fifth place
July 15
Mexico	14
Venezuela	11
Seventh place
July 15
Cuba	13
Ecuador	6

=== Fifth to Eighth place ===
13 July 2015; 12:00	Report	Venezuela	9–8	Cuba	Markham Pan Am Centre; Referees: Reynel Castillo (PUR), Mark Maretzki (USA)
13 July 2015; 12:00	Report	Score by quarters: 1-3, 1-2, 2-1, 5-2			Markham Pan Am Centre; Referees: Reynel Castillo (PUR), Mark Maretzki (USA)
13 July 2015; 12:00	Report	Velazquez 2	Goals	Carales 4	Markham Pan Am Centre; Referees: Reynel Castillo (PUR), Mark Maretzki (USA)

13 July 2015; 14:00	Report	Mexico	17–7	Ecuador	Markham Pan Am Centre; Referees: Guillermo Grgicevic (ARG), William Mackay (CAN)
13 July 2015; 14:00	Report	Score by quarters: 3-3, 3-4, 6-0, 5-0			Markham Pan Am Centre; Referees: Guillermo Grgicevic (ARG), William Mackay (CAN)
13 July 2015; 14:00	Report	O'Brien Jr. 5	Goals	Kaltenbach 4	Markham Pan Am Centre; Referees: Guillermo Grgicevic (ARG), William Mackay (CAN)

=== Seventh place match ===
15 July 2015; 12:00	Report	Cuba	13–6	Ecuador	Markham Pan Am Centre; Referees: Claudia Aguilar (MEX), Hugo Paredes (VEN)
15 July 2015; 12:00	Report	Score by quarters: 2-1, 1-3, 5-2, 5-0			Markham Pan Am Centre; Referees: Claudia Aguilar (MEX), Hugo Paredes (VEN)
15 July 2015; 12:00	Report	Carales 5	Goals	Kaltenbach 3	Markham Pan Am Centre; Referees: Claudia Aguilar (MEX), Hugo Paredes (VEN)

=== Fifth place match ===
15 July 2015; 14:00	Report	Mexico	14–11	Venezuela	Markham Pan Am Centre; Referees: Reynel Castillo (PUR), Stéphane Roy (CAN)
15 July 2015; 14:00	Report	Score by quarters: 3-3, 4-2, 2-3, 5-3			Markham Pan Am Centre; Referees: Reynel Castillo (PUR), Stéphane Roy (CAN)
15 July 2015; 14:00	Report	Avalos 4	Goals	Perez Ribas 3	Markham Pan Am Centre; Referees: Reynel Castillo (PUR), Stéphane Roy (CAN)

== Medal round ==
=== Finals Bracket ===
Semi-finals
July 13
United States	9
Canada	8
July 13
Argentina	9
Brazil	15

Final
July 15
United States	11
Brazil	9
Third place
July 15
Canada	16
Argentina	8

=== Semifinals ===
13 July 2015; 18:00	Report	United States	9–8	Canada	Markham Pan Am Centre; Referees: Jaume Teixido (SPA), Thomas Mulnar (HUN)
13 July 2015; 18:00	Report	Score by quarters: 3-1, 1-2, 2-1, 3-4			Markham Pan Am Centre; Referees: Jaume Teixido (SPA), Thomas Mulnar (HUN)
13 July 2015; 18:00	Report	Cupido 3	Goals	Conway 3, Boyd 2, Vikalo 1, Graham 1, Taschereau 1	Markham Pan Am Centre; Referees: Jaume Teixido (SPA), Thomas Mulnar (HUN)

13 July 2015; 20:00	Report	Argentina	9–15	Brazil	Markham Pan Am Centre; Referees: Arnoldo Zambrano (VEN), Daniel Vasquez (MEX)
13 July 2015; 20:00	Report	Score by quarters: 1-3, 1-4, 4-2, 4-5			Markham Pan Am Centre; Referees: Arnoldo Zambrano (VEN), Daniel Vasquez (MEX)
13 July 2015; 20:00	Report	Carabantes 3, Yanez 2, Veich 1, Bulgheroni 1, Damarchi 1, Lopez 1	Goals	Perrone 3	Markham Pan Am Centre; Referees: Arnoldo Zambrano (VEN), Daniel Vasquez (MEX)

=== Bronze medal match ===
15 July 2015; 18:00	Report	(bronze) Canada	16–8	Argentina	Markham Pan Am Centre; Referees: Edmundo Rodrigues (ECU), Humberto Navarro (USA)
15 July 2015; 18:00	Report	Score by quarters: 3-2, 5-3, 4-2, 4-1			Markham Pan Am Centre; Referees: Edmundo Rodrigues (ECU), Humberto Navarro (USA)
15 July 2015; 18:00	Report	Conway 4, Taschereau 3, Mcelroy 2, Graham 2, Boyd 2, Vikalo 1, Kudaba 1.	Goals	Yanez 3, Veich 3, Bulgheroni 1, Corsi 1	Markham Pan Am Centre; Referees: Edmundo Rodrigues (ECU), Humberto Navarro (USA)

=== Gold medal match ===
15 July 2015; 20:00	Report	(gold) United States	11–9	Brazil (silver)	Markham Pan Am Centre; Referees: Thomas Molnar (HUN), Jaume Teixido (ESP)
15 July 2015; 20:00	Report	Score by quarters: 1-0, 6-5, 3-3, 1-1			Markham Pan Am Centre; Referees: Thomas Molnar (HUN), Jaume Teixido (ESP)
15 July 2015; 20:00	Report	2 Players 3	Goals	2 Players 3	Markham Pan Am Centre; Referees: Thomas Molnar (HUN), Jaume Teixido (ESP)

== Final standings ==
Rank	Team	Record	Olympic Qualification
1st place, gold medalist(s)	United States	5 – 0 – 0	Qualifies directly for 2016 Olympic Games
2nd place, silver medalist(s)	Brazil	4 – 0 – 1	Already qualified as a host
3rd place, bronze medalist(s)	Canada	3 – 0 – 2	2016 Men's Water Polo Olympic Games Qualification Tournament
4	Argentina	2 – 0 – 3	
5	Mexico	2 – 1 – 2	
6	Venezuela	1 – 1 – 3	
7	Cuba	2 – 1 – 2	
8	Ecuador	0 – 0 – 5	
