= Aladar Szabo =

Brazilian water polo player

Personal information
- Nationality: Brazilian
- Born: 15 March 1933 Eger, Hungary
- Died: 12 October 1982 (aged 49) São Paulo, Brazil

Sport
- Country: Brazil
- Sport: Water polo
Medal record
Men's water polo
Representing Brazil
Pan American Games
Gold medal – first place	1963 São Paulo	Team competition

Aladar Szabo (15 March 1933 – 12 October 1982) was a Hungarian-Brazilian water polo player. He competed in the men's tournament at the 1964 Summer Olympics.
