= Adhemar Grijó Filho =

Brazilian swimmer and water polo player 1931–2020

Personal information
- Nationality: Brazil
- Born: 18 October 1931 Florianópolis, Santa Catarina, Brazil
- Died: 23 August 2020 (aged 88) Angra dos Reis, Rio de Janeiro, Brazil
- Height: 1.74 m (5 ft 9 in)

Sport
- Sport: Swimming
- Strokes: Breaststroke
Medal record
Men's water polo
Representing Brazil
Pan American Games
Gold medal – first place	1963 São Paulo	Team competition
Bronze medal – third place	1955 Mexico City	Team competition
Bronze medal – third place	1959 Chicago	Team competition

Adhemar Grijó Filho (18 October 1931 – 23 August 2020) was a Brazilian athlete who competed in three Olympics. He represented Brazil in swimming at the 1952 Olympics and in water polo at the 1960 and 1964 Olympics.

== Career ==
At the inaugural Pan American Games in 1951, in Buenos Aires, Argentina, he finished 6th in the 200-metre breaststroke. At the 1952 Summer Olympics in Helsinki, he swam the 200-metre breaststroke, not reaching the finals. At the 1955 Pan American Games in Mexico City, he won the bronze medal in the Water Polo. At the 1959 Pan American Games in Chicago, he won the bronze medal in the Water Polo. At the 1963 Pan American Games in São Paulo, he won the gold medal in the Water Polo. At Rome 1960 and Tokyo 1964, he finished 13th with the Brazilian Water Polo team.
