= Gabriel Reis =

Brazilian water polo player

Personal information
- Born: March 12, 1984 (age 42)

Sport
- Club: Clube de Regatas Guanabara; CN Montjuïc; Botafogo de Futebol e Regatas
Medal record
Men's water polo
Representing Brazil
Pan American Games
Silver medal – second place	2003 Santo Domingo	Team
Silver medal – second place	2007 Rio de Janeiro	Team
Bronze medal – third place	2011 Guadalajara	Team
South American Championship
Gold medal – first place	2004 Mar del Plata	Team
Gold medal – first place	2006 Medellín	Team

Gabriel Reis Lopes Rocha (born March 12, 1984, in Rio de Janeiro) is a water polo player from Brazil. He competed in two consecutive Pan American Games for his native country, starting in 2003. Reis won two silver medals at this event with the Brazil men's national water polo team.
