= Carlos Carvalho =

Brazilian water polo player

Personal information
- Full name: Carlos Eduardo Carvalho
- Nickname: Carlinhos
- Born: 26 March 1957 (age 67); Rio de Janeiro, Brazil

Sport
- Sport: Water polo

Carlos Eduardo Carvalho (born 26 March 1957), commonly known as Carlinhos, is a Brazilian water polo player. He competed in the men's tournament at the 1984 Summer Olympics.
