= Jonas Crivella =

Brazilian water polo player

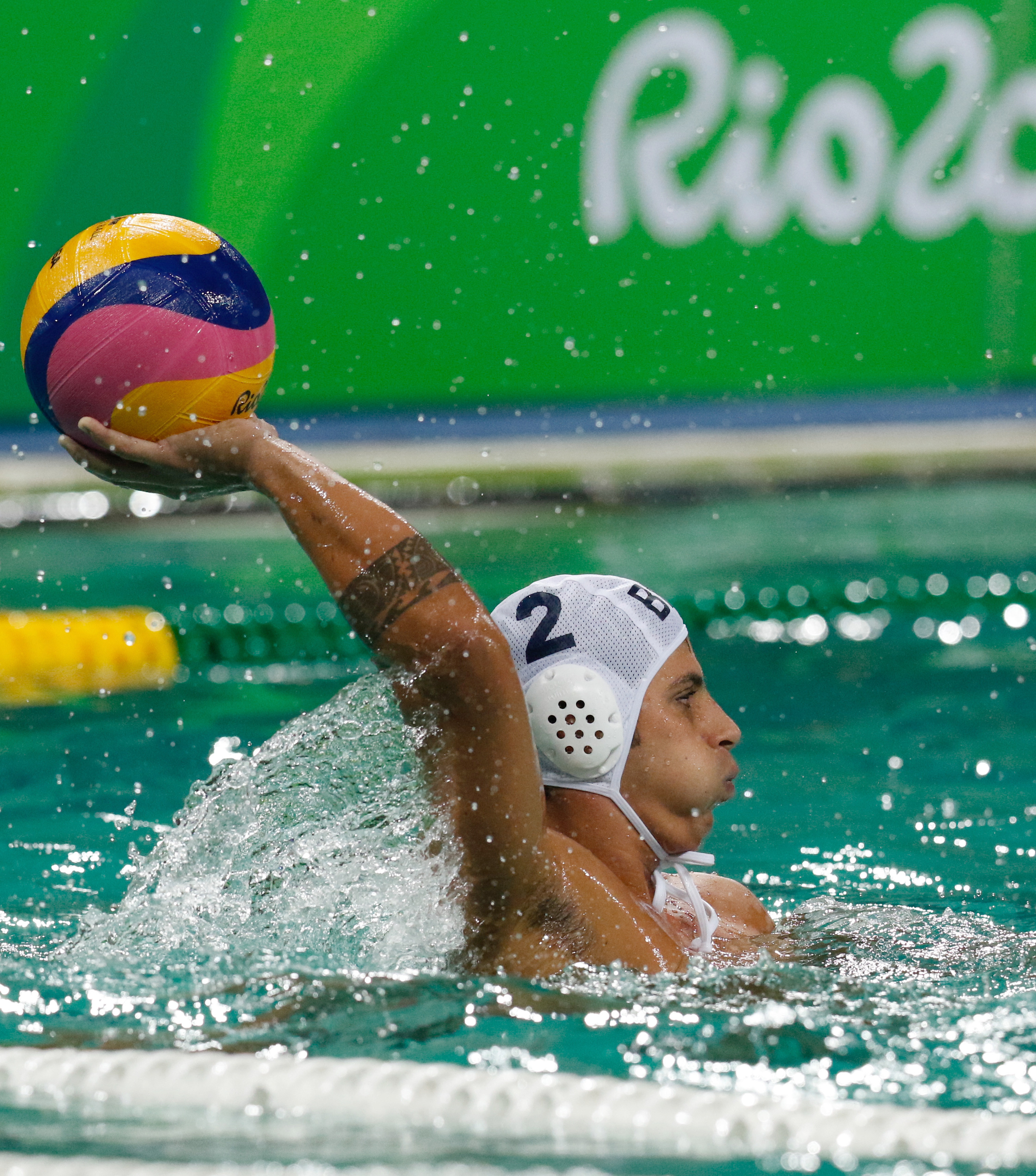
- Crivella at the 2016 Olympics

Personal information
- Born: 30 April 1988 (age 38) Rio de Janeiro, Brazil
- Height: 181 cm (5 ft 11 in)
- Weight: 82 kg (181 lb)

Sport
- Sport: Water Polo
- Club: Botafogo
- Coached by: Ratko Rudic
Medal record
Representing Brazil
World League
Bronze medal – third place	2015 Bergamo	Team
Pan American Games
Silver medal – second place	2015 Toronto	Team
Bronze medal – third place	2011 Guadalajara	Team
- Updated on 19 August 2015

Jonas Crivella (born 30 April 1988) is a water polo player from Brazil. He was part of the Brazilian team at the 2015 World Aquatics Championships. and 2016 Summer Olympics. He won two medals at the Pan American Games in 2011 and 2015.
