= Paulo Salemi =

Brazilian water polo player

Personal information
- Born: 8 August 1993 (age 32)
- Height: 191 cm (6 ft 3 in)
- Weight: 94 kg (207 lb)

Sport
- Sport: Water Polo
- Club: Botafogo
Medal record
Representing Brazil
Pan American Games
Silver medal – second place	2015 Toronto	Team

Paulo Salemi (born 8 August 1993) is a water polo player from Brazil. He was part of the Brazilian team at the 2016 Summer Olympics, where the team was eliminated in the quarterfinals.
