= André Cordeiro (water polo) =

Brazilian water polo player

Personal information
- Full name: André Luiz Pessanha Cordeiro
- Nickname: Pará
- Born: August 9, 1967 (age 58) Rio de Janeiro, Brazil
Medal record
Men's water polo
Representing Brazil
Pan American Games
Silver medal – second place	2003 Santo Domingo	Team
Silver medal – second place	2007 Rio de Janeiro	Team
South American Games
Gold medal – first place	1998 San Felipe	Team
Gold medal – first place	2000 Mar del Plata	Team
Gold medal – first place	2002 Belém	Team
Gold medal – first place	2004 Maldonado	Team
Gold medal – first place	2006 Medellín	Team

André Luiz Pessanha Cordeiro (born August 9, 1967) is a water polo goalkeeper from Brazil. Nicknamed Pará, he competed in three consecutive Pan American Games for his native country, starting in 1999. Cordeiro won two silver medals at this event with the Brazil men's national water polo team. In the South American Games, "Pará", won five consecutive gold medals with Brazil Squad in the years of 1998, 2000, 2002, 2004 and 2006.
