= Ives González =

Brazilian water polo player (born 1980)

Personal information
- Born: 12 October 1980 (age 45)
- Height: 191 cm (6 ft 3 in)
- Weight: 102 kg (225 lb)

Sport
- Sport: Water polo
- Club: Pinheiros
Medal record
Representing Brazil
Pan American Games
| Silver medal – second place | 2015 Toronto | Team |

Ives González Alonso (born 12 October 1980) is a water polo player from Brazil. He was part of the Brazilian team at the 2016 Summer Olympics, where the team was eliminated in the quarterfinals. He was also a member of the team that won silver at the 2015 Pan American Games.
