= Felipe Silva (water polo) =

Brazilian water polo player

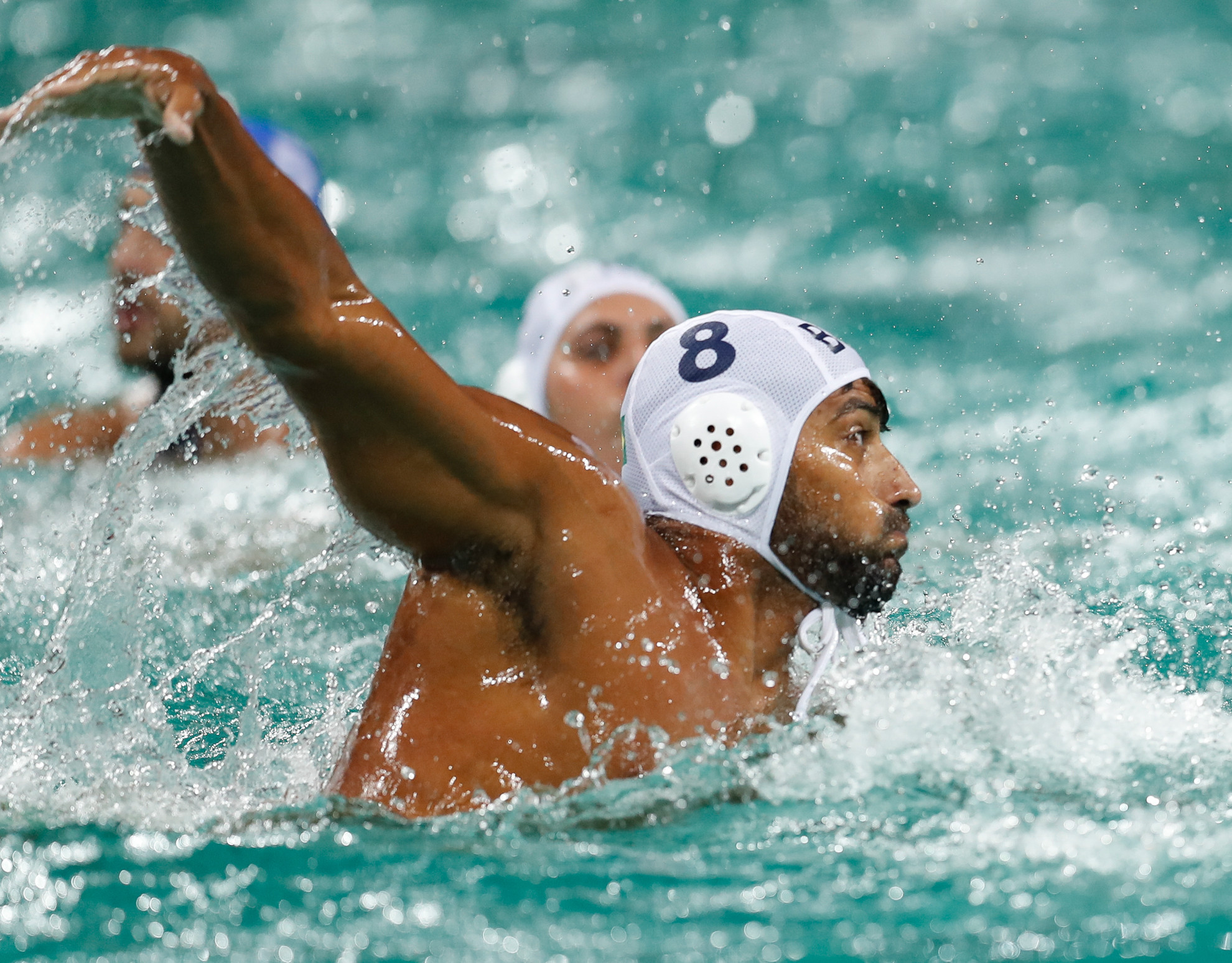

Personal information
- Born: 8 August 1984 (age 41)
- Height: 196 cm (6 ft 5 in)
- Weight: 98 kg (216 lb)

Sport
- Sport: Water polo
- Club: Pinheiros
Medal record
Representing Brazil
Pan American Games
Silver medal – second place	2015 Toronto	Team

Felipe Santos da Costa e Silva (born 8 August 1984) is a water polo player from Brazil. He was part of the Brazilian team at the 2016 Summer Olympics, where the team was eliminated in the quarterfinals.
