= Hilton de Almeida =

Brazilian water polo player (1933–1997)

Personal information
- Born: 5 May 1933; Guanabara, Brazil
- Died: 10 June 1997 (aged 64); Rio de Janeiro, Brazil

Sport
- Sport: Water polo

Hilton de Almeida (5 May 1933 – 10 June 1997) was a Brazilian water polo player. He competed in the men's tournament at the 1960 Summer Olympics.
