= Bernardo Rocha =

Brazilian water polo player

Personal information
- Born: 3 July 1989 (age 36)
- Height: 184 cm (6 ft 0 in)
- Weight: 96 kg (212 lb)

Sport
- Sport: Water polo
- Club: SESI São Paulo
Medal record
Representing Brazil
Pan American Games
Silver medal – second place	2015 Toronto	Team
Bronze medal – third place	2011 Guadalajara	Team
Bronze medal – third place	2019 Lima	Team

Bernardo Rocha (born 3 July 1989) is a water polo player from Brazil. He was part of the Brazilian team at the 2016 Summer Olympics, where the team was eliminated in the quarterfinals.
