= Puerto Rico men's national water polo team =

Puerto Rico
- FINA code: PUR
- Confederation: UANA (Americas)

World League
- Appearances: 1 (first in 2007)
- Best result: Preliminary round (2007)

The Puerto Rico men's national water polo team is the representative for Puerto Rico in international men's water polo.

== Results ==
=== FINA World League ===
- 2007 — Preliminary round
