= Water polo at the 2005 World Aquatics Championships =

The water polo events at the 2005 World Aquatics Championships were held from 17 to 30 July 2005, in Montréal, Canada.

== Medal summary ==
=== Medal table ===
Rank	Nation	Gold	Silver	Bronze	Total
1	Hungary (HUN)	1	1	0	2
2	Serbia and Montenegro (SCG)	1	0	0	1
3	United States (USA)	0	1	0	1
4	Canada (CAN)	0	0	1	1
4	Greece (GRE)	0	0	1	1
Totals (5 entries)		2	2	2	6

=== Medalists ===
Event	Gold	Silver	Bronze
Men	Serbia and Montenegro Denis Šefik; Petar Trbojević; Nikola Janović; Vanja Udovičić; Dejan Savić; Danilo Ikodinović; Slobodan Nikić; Vladimir Gojković; Boris Zloković; Aleksandar Šapić; Vladimir Vujasinović; Predrag Jokić; Zdravko Radić Head coach Petar Porobić	Hungary Zoltán Szécsi; Dániel Varga; Norbert Madaras; Ádám Steinmetz; Tamás Kásás; Attila Vári; Gergely Kiss; Csaba Kiss; Rajmund Fodor; Márton Szívós; István Gergely; Tamás Molnár; Péter Biros Head coach Dénes Kemény	Greece Georgios Reppas; Anastasios Schizas; Dimitrios Mazis; Emmanouil Mylonakis; Theodoros Chatzitheodorou; Argyris Theodoropoulos; Christos Afroudakis; Georgios Ntoskas; Georgios Afroudakis; Stefanos-Petros Santa; Antonios Vlontakis; Manthos Voulgarakis; Nikolaos Deligiannis Head coach Alessandro Campagna
Women	Hungary Patricia Horvath; Eszter Tomaskovics; Khrisctina Serfozo; Dora Kisteleki; Mercedes Stieber; Andrea Toth; Rita Dravucz; Krisztina Zantleitner; Orsolya Takacs; Aniko Pelle; Agnes Valkai; Fruzsina Bravik; Timea Benko Head coach Tamás Faragó	United States Emily Feher; Heather Petri; Ericka Lorenz; Brenda Villa; Lauren Wenger; Natalie Golda; Kristina Kunkel; Erika Figge; Jaime Hipp; Kelly Rulon; Moriah van Norman; Drue Wawrzynski; Thalia Munro Head coach Heather Moody	Canada Rachel Riddell; Krystina Alogbo; Whynter Lamarre; Susan Gardiner; Tara Campbell; Marie Luc Arpin; Cora Campbell; Dominique Perreault; Ann Dow; Jana Salat; Valérie Dionne; Christine Robinson; Johanne Bégin Head coach Patrick Oaten
