= 2007 Holiday Cup =

Water polo competition

Water polo at the 2007 Holiday Cup

Medalists
gold medal	Italy
silver medal	Netherlands
bronze medal	United States

The 2007 Holiday Cup was the ninth edition of the women's water polo competition, held in the Belmont Plaza Pool in Long Beach, California, United States. The tournament took place from December 5 to December 9, 2007. The tournament served as a preparation for the 2008 Summer Olympics qualifiers (with the exception of the United States and the Netherlands who had already qualified).

== Squads ==
=== Australia ===
- Victoria Brown
- Nikita Cuffe
- Katie Finucane
- Kate Gynther
- Fiona Hammond
- Bronwen Knox
- Alicia McCormack
- Sarah Mills
- Jane Moran
- Melissa Rippon
- Rebecca Rippon
- Jenna Santoromito
- Mia Santoromito
- Sophie Smith

Head coach: Greg McFadden

=== Canada ===
- Krystina Alogbo
- Johanne Begin
- Joëlle Békhazi
- Alison Braden
- Cora Campbell
- Tara Campbell
- Emily Csikos
- Whynter Lamarre
- Sandra Lizé
- Katrina Monton
- Dominique Perreault
- Rachel Riddell
- Christine Robinson
- Rosanna Tomiuk

Head coach: Patrick Oaten

=== Italy ===
- Annalisa Bosello
- Silvia Bosurgi
- Elisa Casanova
- Marta Colaiocco
- Teresa Frassinetti
- Eleonora Gay
- Elena Gigli
- Tania di Mario
- Martina Miceli
- Maddalena Musumeci
- Francesca Pavan
- Cinzia Ragusa
- Erzsebet Valkai
- Manuela Zanchi

Head coach: Mauro Maugeri

=== Netherlands ===
- Iefke van Belkum
- Gillian van den Berg
- Daniëlle de Bruijn
- Mieke Cabout
- Rianne Guichelaar
- Biurakn Hakhverdian
- Marieke van den Ham
- Noeki Klein
- Lana Mandjes
- Ilse van der Meijden
- Meike de Nooy
- Alette Sijbring
- Yasemin Smit
- Nienke Vermeer

Head coach: Robin van Galen

=== Russia ===
- Olla Belyaeva
- Olga Botynov
- Yulia Gaufler
- Evgenia Ivanova
- Sofia Konukh
- Ekaterina Kyznestova
- Ekaterina Pantyulina
- Ekaterina Prokofyna
- Evgeniya Protsenko
- Natalia Shepelina
- Elena Smurova
- Evgenia Soboleva
- Valentina Vorontsova
- Alena Vylegzhanina

Head coach: Aleksandr Kleymenov

=== United States ===
- Betsey Armstrong
- Patty Cardenas
- Kami Craig
- Erika Figge
- Molly Hayes
- Jamie Hipp
- Natalie Golda
- Alison Gregorka
- Heather Petri
- Jessica Steffens
- Moriah van Norman
- Brenda Villa
- Lauren Wenger
- Elsie Windes

Head coach: Guy Baker

== Preliminary round ==
- December 5, 2007

Italy	11–10	Russia
Australia	10–12	Netherlands
United States	10–7	Canada

- December 6, 2007

Russia	10–7	Australia
Italy	10–8	Canada
United States	5–8	Netherlands

- December 6, 2007

Canada	9–13	Australia
Russia	16–15	Netherlands
United States	12–8	Italy

- December 7, 2007

Russia	15–12	Canada
Netherlands	14–15	Italy
United States	5–6	Australia

- December 8, 2007

Canada	7–12	Netherlands
Australia	8–11	Italy
United States	12–13	Russia

=== Standings ===
	Team	Points	G	W	D	L	GF	GA
1.	Italy	11	5	4	0	1	55	52
2.	Netherlands	11	5	3	0	2	61	53
3.	Russia	10	5	4	0	1	64	57
4.	United States	7	5	2	0	3	44	42
5.	Australia	6	5	2	0	3	44	47
6.	Canada	0	5	0	0	5	43	57

== Final round ==
=== 5th/6th place match ===
- December 9, 2007

Australia	8–6	Canada

=== Bronze medal match ===
- December 9, 2007

United States	17–7	Russia

=== Gold medal match ===
- December 9, 2007

Italy	10–9	Netherlands

== Final ranking ==
RANK	TEAM
	Italy
	Netherlands
	United States
4.	Russia
5.	Australia
6.	Canada

2007 Women's Holiday Cup

Italy
First title

== Individual awards ==
- Most Valuable Player
  - Daniëlle de Bruijn (NED)
