= Canada women's national water polo team =

Women's national water polo team representing Canada

Canada
- FINA code: CAN
- Association: Water Polo Canada
- Confederation: UANA (Americas)
- Asst coach: Cora Campbell; Stefano Posterivo
- Captain: Emma Wright

FINA ranking (since 2008)
- Current: 6 (as of August 9, 2021)
- Highest: 6 (2019, 2021)

Olympic Games (team statistics)
- Appearances: 4 (first in 2000)
- Best result: 5th place (2000)

World Championship
- Appearances: 14 (first in 1986)
- Best result: (silver) (1991, 2009)

World Cup
- Appearances: 17 (first in 1979)
- Best result: (gold) (1981)

World League
- Appearances: 16 (first in 2004)
- Best result: (silver) (2009, 2017)

Pan American Games
- Appearances: 6 (first in 1999)
- Best result: (gold) (1999)

ASUA Cup (UANA Cup)
- Best result: (gold) (2011, 2013, 2015)

Commonwealth Championship
- Appearances: 3 (first in 2002)
- Best result: (silver) (2002, 2006, 2014)

Media
- Website: waterpolo.ca

The Canada women's national water polo team (French: Équipe féminine de water-polo du Canada) represents Canada in women's international water polo competitions and friendly matches. The team is overseen by Water Polo Canada, a member of the Fédération Internationale de Natation (FINA). In 1981 the team claimed its first international prize, winning the FINA Water Polo World Cup.

== Results ==
=== Olympic Games ===
- 2000 — 5th place
- 2004 — 7th place
- 2020 — 7th place
- 2024 — 8th place

=== World Championship ===
Year	Position
(Spain) 1986	4th
(Australia) 1991	Silver medal
(Italy) 1994	5th
(Australia) 1998	6th
(Japan) 2001	Bronze medal
(Spain) 2003	4th
(Canada) 2005	Bronze medal
(Australia) 2007	6th
(Italy) 2009	Silver medal
(China) 2011	8th
(Spain) 2013	8th
(Russia) 2015	11th
(Hungary) 2017	4th
(South Korea) 2019	9th
(Hungary) 2022	9th
(Japan) 2023	7th
(Qatar) 2024	8th
(Singapore) 2025	Did not qualify
Total	Qualified: 17/18

=== FINA World Cup ===
- 1979 — 4th place
- 1980 — (bronze)
- 1981 — (gold)
- 1983 — 4th place
- 1988 — (bronze)
- 1989 — 4th place
- 1991 — 4th place
- 1993 — 6th place
- 1997 — 5th place
- 1999 — 5th place
- 2002 — 3rd place
- 2006 — 7th place
- 2010 — 5th place
- 2018 — 6th place

=== FINA World League ===
- 2004 — 5th place
- 2005 — 6th place
- 2006 — 6th place
- 2007 — 4th place
- 2009 — (silver)
- 2010 — 4th place
- 2011 — 4th place
- 2012 — 5th place
- 2013 — (bronze)
- 2014 — 4th place
- 2015 — 4th place
- 2016 — 7th place
- 2017 — (silver)
- 2018 — 4th place
- 2020 — 4th place
- 2022 — 7th place

=== Pan American Games ===
- 1999 — (gold)
- 2003 — (silver)
- 2007 — (silver)
- 2011 — (silver)
- 2015 — (silver)
- 2019 — (silver)
- 2023 — (silver)

=== UANA Cup (ASUA Cup) ===
- 2013a – (gold)
- 2013b – (silver)
- 2015 – (gold)
- 2019 – (gold)
- 2023 – (gold)

=== Commonwealth Championship ===
- 2002 – (silver)
- 2006 – (silver)
- 2014 – (silver)

=== Holiday Cup ===
- 1998 — 3rd place
- 1999 — 2nd place
- 2000 — 2nd place
- 2001 — 2nd place
- 2002 — 2nd place
- 2003 — 3rd place
- 2006 — 4th place
- 2007 — 6th place
- 2009 — 3rd place
- 2012 — 2nd place

== Team ==
=== Current squad ===
Roster for the 2024 Summer Olympics.

Head coach: David Paradelo

- 1 Jessica Gaudreault GK
- 2 Rae Lekness CF
- 3 Axelle Crevier D
- 4 Emma Wright (c) D
- 5 Marilia Mimides D
- 6 Blaire McDowell D
- 7 Verica Bakoc D
- 8 Elyse Lemay-Lavoie CF
- 9 Hayley McKelvey D
- 10 Serena Browne CB
- 11 Kindred Paul CB
- 12 Shae La Roche D
- 13 Clara Vulpisi GK

=== Past squads ===
- 1981 FINA World Cup — Gold Medal
  - Sylvie Archambault, Tracy Crandall, Odile Delaserra, Isabel Deschamps, Michelle Despatis, Jocelyne Dumay, Diedre Fincham, Johanne Gervais, Janice Gilbey, Heather Gifford, Hilary Knowles, Denise Préfontaine, and Sylvie Thibault. Head Coach Dominique Dion
- 1983 FINA World Cup — 4th place
  - Odile Delaserra, Isabel Deschamps, Michelle Despatis, Diedre Fincham, Johanne Gervais, Heather Kaulbach, Hélène Miron, Denise Préfontaine, Josée Monast, Danielle Tétreault, Chantal Larocque, Marie-Claude Deslières, and Sylvie Thibault. Head Coach Dominique Dion, Assistant Coach Gaëtan Turcotte
- 1986 World Championship — 4th place
  - Johanne Gervais, Heather Kaulbach, Nathalie Auclair, Ghislaine Brunetta, Josée Monast, Pascale Deslières, Chantal Larocque, Marie-Claude Deslières, Vicki Nickless, Melanie Nickless, Nathalie Deschênes, Marilyn Thorington, and France Bastien. Head Coach Daniel Berthelette, Assistant Coach Sylvain Huet
- 1988 FINA World Cup — Bronze Medal
  - Roxane Lafrance, Heather Kaulbach, Josée Martin, Ghislaine Brunetta, Caroline Boisclair, Pascale Deslières, Kim Schweltzer, Marie-Claude Deslières, Isabelle Auger, Melanie Nickless, Nathalie Deschênes, Marilyn Thorington, and France Bastien. Head Coach Daniel Berthelette
- 1989 FINA World Cup — 4th place
  - Roxane Lafrance, Heather Kaulbach, Josée Martin, Sabine Difilippo, Caroline Boisclair, Pascale Deslières, Heather Smith, Marie-Claude Deslières, Isabelle Auger, Melanie Nickless, Nathalie Deschênes, Marilyn Thorington, and France Bastien. Head Coach Daniel Berthelette, Assistant Coach Dominique Dion
- 1991 World Championship — Silver Medal
  - Roxane Lafrance, Heather Kaulbach, Karen Morrisson, Sabine Difilippo, Caroline Boisclair, Pascale Deslières, Heather Smith, Marie-Claude Deslières, Isabelle Auger, Karen Gibson, Nathalie Deschênes, Marilyn Thorington, and Chantal Larocque. Head Coach Daniel Berthelette, Assistant Coach Dominique Dion
- 1994 World Championship — 5th place
  - Roxane Lafrance, Heather Kaulbach, Karen Morrisson, Sabine Difilippo, Melanie Nickless, Pascale Deslières, Andrea Hoffman, Marie-Claude Deslières, Isabelle Auger, Cora Campbell, Trina Campbell, Josée Marsolais, and Ann Dow. Head Coach Daniel Berthelette, Assistant Coach Dominique Dion
- 1999 Pan American Games — Gold Medal
  - Marie Luc Arpin, Johanne Bégin, Cora Campbell, Melissa Collins, Valérie Dionne, Ann Dow, Waneek Horn-Miller, Jana Salat and Kaliya Young. Marie-Claude Deslières, Sandra Lizé, Josée Marsolais, Lila Fraser, Head Coach Daniel Berthelete, Assistant Coach David Hart
- 2000 Olympic Games — 5th place
  - Marie-Luc Arpin, Isabelle Auger, Johanne Bégin, Cora Campbell, Melissa Collins, Marie-Claude Deslières, Valérie Dionne, Ann Dow, Susan Gardiner, Waneek Horn-Miller, Sandra Lizé, Josée Marsolais, and Jana Salat. Head Coach Daniel Berthelette, Assistant Coach David Hart, Assistant Coach Dominique Dion
- 2002 Holiday Cup — Silver Medal
  - Marie-Luc Arpin, Johanne Bégin, Cora Campbell, Shannon Carroll, Melissa Collins, Andrea Dewar, Valérie Dionne, Ann Dow, Nancy El-Sakkary, Nadine Gilbert (goal), Whynter Lamarre (goal), Waneek Horn-Miller, and Sandra Lizé. Head Coach: Wouly de Bie.
- 2002 FINA World Cup — Bronze Medal
  - Marie-Luc Arpin, Christi Bardecki, Melissa Collins, Andrea Dewar, Valérie Dionne, Ann Dow, Susan Gardiner, Sandra Lizé, Nadine Gilbert (goal), Marianne Illing, Whynter Lamarre (goal). Head Coach: Patrick Oaten.
- 2003 World Championship — 4th place
  - Marie Luc Arpin, Christi Bardecki, Johanne Bégin, Cora Campbell, Melissa Collins, Andrea Dewar, Valérie Dionne, Ann Dow, Susan Gardiner, Marianne Illing, Rachel Riddell, Whynter Lamarre (goal), and Jana Salat. Head Coach: Patrick Oaten.
- 2003 Pan American Games — Silver Medal
  - Marie Luc Arpin, Christi Bardecki, Johanne Bégin, Cora Campbell, Melissa Collins, Andrea Dewar, Valérie Dionne, Ann Dow, Susan Gardiner, Marianne Illing, Whynter Lamarre (goal), Rachel Riddell, and Jana Salat. Head Coach: Patrick Oaten.
- 2004 Olympic Games — 7th place
  - Marie Luc Arpin, Johanne Bégin, Cora Campbell, Melissa Collins, Andrea Dewar, Valerie Dionne, Ann Dow, Susan Gardiner, Marianne Illing, Whynter Lamarre, Rachel Riddell (goal), Christine Robinson, and Jana Salat. Head Coach: Patrick Oaten.
- 2005 FINA World League — 6th place
  - Krystina Alogbo, Alison Braden, Tara Campbell, Joëlle Békhazi, Nancy El-Sakkary, Susan Gardiner, Whynter Lamarre, Katrin Monton, Dominique Perreault, Marina Radu, Rachel Riddell, Christine Robinson, and Whitney Genoway. Head Coach: Patrick Oaten.
- 2005 World Championship — Bronze Medal
  - Krystina Alogbo, Marie-Luc Arpin, Johanne Bégin, Cora Campbell, Tara Campbell, Valerie Dionne, Ann Dow, Susan Gardiner, Whynter Lamarre, Dominique Perreault, Rachel Riddell (goal), Christine Robinson, and Jana Salat. Head Coach: Patrick Oaten.
- 2006 FINA World League — 6th place
  - Krystina Alogbo, Joëlle Békhazi, Alison Braden, Valerie Dionne, Susan Gardiner (captain), Whitney Genoway, Whynter Lamarre, Sandra Lizé, Dominique Perreault, Marina Radu, Rachel Riddell (goal), Christine Robinson, and Rosanna Tomiuk. Head Coach: Patrick Oaten.
- 2007 World Championship — 6th place
  - Krystina Alogbo, Joëlle Békhazi, Alison Braden, Cora Campbell, Tara Campbell, Emily Csikos, Whynter Lamarre, Sandra Lizé, Katrina Monton, Dominique Perreault, Marina Radu, Rachel Riddell, and Christine Robinson. Head Coach: Patrick Oaten.
- 2007 FINA World League — 4th place
  - Krystina Alogbo, Joëlle Békhazi, Alison Braden, Cora Campbell, Tara Campbell, Jenna Crook, Emily Csikos, Whynter Lamarre, Sandra Lizé, Dominique Perreault, Marina Radu, Rachel Riddell (goal), Christine Robinson, and Rosanna Tomiuk. Head Coach: Patrick Oaten.
- 2007 Holiday Cup — 6th place
  - Krystina Alogbo, Johanne Bégin, Joëlle Békhazi, Alison Braden, Cora Campbell, Tara Campbell, Emily Csikos, Whynter Lamarre, Sandra Lizé, Katrina Monton, Dominique Perreault, Rachel Riddell (goal), Christine Robinson, and Rosanna Tomiuk. Head Coach: Patrick Oaten.
- 2007 Pan American Games — Silver Medal
  - Krystina Alogbo, Joëlle Békhazi, Alison Braden, Cora Campbell, Tara Campbell, Emily Csikos, Whynter Lamarre, Sandra Lizé, Dominique Perreault, Marina Radu, Rachel Riddell, Christine Robinson, and Rosanna Tomiuk. Head Coach: Patrick Oaten.
- 2008 FINA Olympic Qualifying Tournament — 5th place
  - Rachel Riddell, Krystina Alogbo, Sandra Lizé, Emily Csikos, Johanne Bégin, Katrina Monton, Rosanna Tomiuk, Dominique Perreault, Alison Braden, Christine Robinson, Tara Campbell, Marina Radu, and Whynter Lamarre. Head Coach: Patrick Oaten.
- 2009 World Championship — Silver Medal
  - . Head Coach:.
- 2017 World Championship — 4th place
  - Jessica Gaudreault, Krystina Alogbo, Axelle Crevier, Emma Wright, Monika Eggens, Kyra Christmas, Joëlle Békhazi, Elyse Lemay-Lavoie, Hayley McKelvey, Christine Robinson, Kelly McKee, Shae Fournier, and Ymane Hage. Head Coach: Haris Pavlidis.

== Under-20 team ==
Canada's women won the title at the 2003 FINA Junior Water Polo World Championships.

== See also ==
- Canada women's Olympic water polo team records and statistics
- Canada men's national water polo team
