= Water polo at the 2009 World Aquatics Championships =

Water polo at the 2009 World Aquatics Championships were held from July 19 to August 1, 2009, in Rome, Italy.

== Medalists ==
=== Men ===
Gold	Silver	Bronze
Serbia Slobodan Soro; Marko Avramović; Živko Gocić; Vanja Udovičić (c); Slavko Gak; Duško Pijetlović; Slobodan Nikić; Milan Aleksić; Nikola Rađen; Filip Filipović; Andrija Prlainović; Stefan Mitrović; Gojko Pijetlović Head coach: Dejan Udovičić	Spain Inaki Aguilar; Mario José García; David Martín; Blai Mallarach; Guillermo Molina; Marc Minguell; Iván Gallego; Albert Español; Xavier Vallès; Felipe Perrone; Iván Pérez (c); Xavier García; Daniel López Head coach: Rafael Aguilar	Croatia Ivo Brzica; Damir Burić; Miho Bošković; Nikša Dobud; Ivan Buljubašić; Srdan Antonijević; Frano Karač; Andro Bušlje; Sandro Sukno; Samir Barač (c); Igor Hinić; Paulo Obradović; Josip Pavić Head coach: Ratko Rudić

=== Women ===
Gold	Silver	Bronze
United States; Elizabeth Armstrong; Heather Petri; Brittany Hayes; Brenda Villa; Lauren Wenger; Tanya Gandy; Kelly Rulon; Jessica Steffens; Elsie Windes; Alison Gregorka; Moriah van Norman; Kameryn Craig; Jaime Komer; Coach: Adam Krikorian	Canada; Rachel Riddell; Krystina Alogbo; Katrina Monton; Emily Csikos; Joëlle Békhazi; Whitney Genoway; Rosanna Tomiuk; Dominique Perreault; Carmen Eggens; Christine Robinson; Tara Campbell; Marina Radu; Marissa Janssens; Coach: Patrick Oaten	Russia; Evgeniya Protsenko; Nadezda Glyzina; Ekaterina Prokofyeva; Sofia Konukh; Alena Vylegzhanina; Natalya Ryzhova-Alenicheva; Ekaterina Pantyulina; Evgenia Soboleva; Anna Timofeeva; Olga Belyaeva; Evgenia Ivanova; Yulia Gaufler; Maria Kovtunovskaya; Coach: Aleksandr Kabanov
