= Water polo at the 2011 Pan American Games =

- Venue: Scotiabank Aquatics Center
- Dates: October 23 - October 29
- Competitors: 208 from 10 nations

Water polo at the 2011 Pan American Games was held from October 23 to October 29, 2011, at the Scotiabank Aquatics Center in Guadalajara, Mexico. Each men's and women's team consisted of 13 athletes. Therefore, a total of 208 athletes competed in water polo at these games. The winner of each tournament (the United States) qualified to compete at the 2012 Summer Olympics in London, Great Britain, while the second through fourth-place finishers in each tournament qualified for the last chance qualifying tournament.

== Medal summary ==
=== Medal table ===
Rank	Nation	Gold	Silver	Bronze	Total
1	United States	2	0	0	2
2	Canada	0	2	0	2
3	Brazil	0	0	2	2
Totals (3 entries)		2	2	2	6

=== Events ===
Event	Gold	Silver	Bronze
Men	United States; Merrill Moses; Peter Varellas; Peter Hudnut; Ryan Bailey; Tony Azevedo; Jeff Powers; Layne Beaubien; Adam Wright; Tim Hutten; Jesse Smith; Brian Alexander; J. W. Krumpholz; Chay Lapin	Canada; Dusan Aleksic; Nicholas Bicari; Justin Boyd; John Conway; Dusko Dakic; Devon Diggle; Aaron Feltham; Kevin Graham; Constantine Kudaba; Jared McElroy; Robin Randall; Scott Robinson; Oliver Vikalo	Brazil; Henrique Carvalho; João Coelho; Danilo Correa; Jonas Crivella; Marcelo Das Chagas; Felipe De Costa; Luís Santos (water polo); Marcelo Franco; Ruda Franco; Gustavo Guimăres; Bernardo Rocha; Gabriel Rocha; Emilio Vieira
Women	United States; Elizabeth Armstrong; Heather Petri; Melissa Seidemann; Brenda Villa; Lauren Wenger; Maggie Steffens; Courtney Mathewson; Jessica Steffens; Elsie Windes; Kelly Rulon; Annika Dries; Kami Craig; Tumuaialii Anae	Canada; Krystina Alogbo; Joëlle Békhazi; Tara Campbell; Emily Csikos; Monika Eggens; Whitney Genoway; Katrina Monton; Dominique Perreault; Marina Radu; Rachel Riddell; Christine Robinson; Rosanna Tomiuk; Anna Yelizarova	Brazil; Tess De Oliveira; Cecilia Canetti; Marina Zablith; Marina Canetti; Catherine De Oliveira; Izabella Chiappini; Cristina Beer; Luíza Carvalho; Fernanda Lissoni; Gabriela Gozani; Mirela Coutinho; Gabriela Dias; Manuela Canetti

== Men ==
The following nations qualified for the men's tournament:

North America	South America	Automatic qualifiers
Cuba; United States; Canada	Argentina; Brazil; Colombia; Venezuela	Mexico

== Women ==
The following nations qualified for the women's tournament:

North America	South America	Automatic qualifiers
Cuba; United States; Canada; Puerto Rico	Argentina; Brazil; Venezuela	Mexico

== Schedule ==
The competition will be spread out across seven days.

Preliminary round	Semifinals	M	Event finals

October	23rd Sun	24th Mon	25th Tue	26th Wed	27th Thu	28th Fri	29th Sat	Gold medals
Men							M	1
Women						M		1
