= Water polo at the 2015 Pan American Games =

- Water polo pictogram for the games
- Venues: Markham Pan Am Centre
- Dates: July 7–15
- No. of events: 2 (1 men, 1 women)
- Competitors: 208 from 9 nations

Water polo at the
2015 Pan American Games
Tournament
men women
Rosters
men women

Water polo competitions at the 2015 Pan American Games in Toronto was held from July 7 to 15 at the Markham Pan Am Centre in Markham. The water polo competitions was the first sporting event to be conducted at the games, beginning three days before the opening ceremony. This is because the Pan American Games were scheduled to be held roughly around the same time as the 2015 World Aquatics Championships scheduled for Kazan, Russia, thus the competition was moved forward to allow for a sufficient gap between the two events. A total of eight men's and women's teams competed in each respective tournament.

The winner of the men's tournament (the United States) qualified for the 2016 Summer Olympics in Rio de Janeiro, Brazil.

== Venue ==
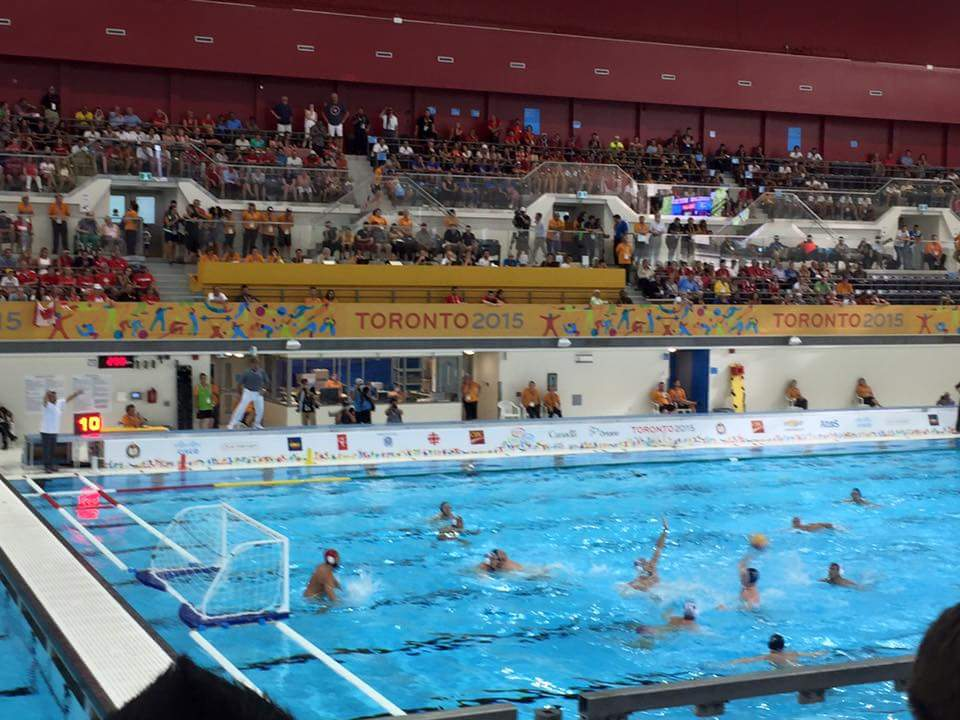
The Markham Pan Am Centre (Atos Markham Pan Am Centre), in Markham, was the venue for the water polo competitions

The competitions took place at the Atos Markham Pan Am Centre (Markham Pan Am Centre) located in the city of Markham, about 31 kilometers from the athletes village. The arena had a capacity of 2,000 people per session (1,000 permanent seating + 1,000 temporary seats). The venue was also host the badminton and table tennis competitions, but in the other side of the centre (a triple gymnasium).

== Competition schedule ==
The following is the competition schedule for the water polo competitions:

P	Preliminaries	½	Semifinals	B	3rd place play-off	F	Final

Event↓/Date →	Tue 7	Wed 8	Thu 9	Fri 10	Sat 11	Sun 12	Mon 13	Tue 14		Wed 15	
Men	P	P	P		P		½			B	F
Women	P	P	P		P	½		B	F		

== Medal table ==
* Host nation (Canada)

Rank	Nation	Gold	Silver	Bronze	Total
1	United States	2	0	0	2
2	Brazil	0	1	1	2
2	Canada*	0	1	1	2
Totals (3 entries)		2	2	2	6

== Medalists ==
Event	Gold	Silver	Bronze
Men's tournament	United States; Merrill Moses; Alex Obert; Luca Cupido; Josh Samuels; Tony Azevedo; Alex Bowen; Bret Bonanni; Nikola Vavic; Jackson Kimbell; Alex Roelse; Jesse Smith; John Mann; McQuin Baron	Brazil; Adrián Delgado; Bernardo Gomes; Bernardo Rocha; Felipe Perrone; Felipe Costa e Silva; Guilherme Gomes; Gustavo Guimarães; Ives Alonso; Jonas Crivella; Josip Vrlić; Paulo Salemi; Thyê Bezerra; Vinicius Antonelli	Canada; Constantine Kudaba; Nicolas Bicari; Justin Boyd; Kevin Graham; Josh Conway; Jared McElroy; Dusan Aleksic; Robin Randall; Oliver Vikalo; Scott Robinson; Alec Taschereau; Dusan Radojcic; George Torakis
Women's tournament	United States; Sami Hill; Maddie Musselman; Melissa Seidemann; Rachel Fattal; Caroline Clark; Maggie Steffens; Courtney Mathewson; Kiley Neushul; Ashley Grossman; Kaleigh Gilchrist; Makenzie Fischer; Kami Craig; Ashleigh Johnson	Canada; Jessica Gaudreault; Krystina Alogbo; Katrina Monton; Emma Wright; Monika Eggens; Jakie Kohli; Joelle Bekhazi; Shae Fournier; Carmen Eggens; Christine Robinson; Stephanie Valin; Dominique Perreault; Claire Wright	Brazil; Tess Oliveira; Marina Zablith; Izabella Chiappini; Catherine Oliveira; Luiza Carvalho; Mirella Coutinho; Gabriela Dias; Diana Abla; Marina Canetti; Lucianne Maia; Melani Dias; Viviane Bahia; Victoria Chamorro

== Qualification ==
A total of eight men's teams and eight women's qualified to compete at the games. The top three teams at the South American Championship and Central American and Caribbean Games qualified for each respective tournament. Venezuela and Colombia who compete in both events, were not eligible to qualify through the latter. The host nation (Canada) and the United States automatically qualified teams in both events. Each nation could enter one team in each tournament (13 athletes per team) for a maximum total of 26 athletes.

=== Men ===
Event	Date	Location	Vacancies	Qualified
Host Nation	—N/a		1	Canada
Qualified automatically	—N/a		1	United States
2014 South American Championship	October 7–11	(Argentina) Mar del Plata	3	Brazil; Argentina; Venezuela
2014 Central American and Caribbean Games	November 22–29	(Mexico) Veracruz	~~3~~ 2	Cuba; Mexico; ~~Puerto Rico~~
Reallocation	—N/a		1	Ecuador
TOTAL			8	

- For unknown reasons, Puerto Rico withdrew from the men's tournament and was replaced with Ecuador.

=== Women ===
Event	Date	Location	Vacancies	Qualified
Host Nation	—N/a		1	Canada
Qualified automatically	—N/a		1	United States
2014 South American Championship	October 7–11	(Argentina) Mar del Plata	3	Brazil; Venezuela; Argentina
2014 Central American and Caribbean Games	November 22–29	(Mexico) Veracruz	3	Puerto Rico; Cuba; Mexico
TOTAL			8	

== Participating nations ==
A total of nine countries qualified water polo teams. The numbers in parentheses represent the number of participants entered.

- Argentina (26)
- Brazil (26)
- Canada (26)
- Cuba (26)
- Ecuador (13)
- Mexico (26)
- Puerto Rico (13)
- United States (26)
- Venezuela (26)
