= Water polo at the 2019 Pan American Games =

- Water polo pictogram
- Venue: Water polo stadium
- Dates: August 4–10, 2019
- No. of events: 2 (1 men, 1 women)
- Competitors: 176 from 9 nations

Water polo competitions at the 2019 Pan American Games in Lima, Peru were held from July 28 to August 10. The venue for the competition was the water polo pool located at the Villa María del Triunfo cluster. A total of eight men's and eight women's teams (each consisting up to 11 athletes) competed in each tournament. This meant a total of 176 athletes were scheduled to compete.

Roster sizes were dropped from 13 to 11, in line with the decision made by FINA (International Swimming Federation) for the 2020 Summer Olympics.

The top team in each tournament not already qualified for the 2020 Summer Olympics will qualify for the said event.

== Medal summary ==
=== Medal table ===
Rank	Nation	Gold	Silver	Bronze	Total
1	United States	2	0	0	2
2	Canada	0	2	0	2
3	Brazil	0	0	2	2
Totals (3 entries)		2	2	2	6

=== Medalists ===
Event	Gold	Silver	Bronze
Men's tournament	United States; Alex Wolf; Johnny Hooper; Marko Vavic; Alex Obert; Ben Hallock; Luca Cupido; Hannes Daube; Max Irving; Alex Bowen; Chancellor Ramirez; Jesse Smith	Canada; Milan Radenovic; Gaelan Patterson; Jeremie Blanchard; Nicolas Constantin-Bicari; Matthew Halajian; Georgios Torakis; Jérémie Côté; Mark Spooner; Aleksa Gardijan; Aria Soleimanipak; Reuel D'Souza	Brazil; Slobodan Soro; Logan Cabral; Pedro Real; Gustavo Coutinho; Roberto Freitas; Guilherme Almeida; Rafael Real; Luis Silva; Bernardo Rocha; Rudá Franco; Gustavo Guimarães
Women's tournament	United States; Ashleigh Johnson; Madeline Musselman; Melissa Seidemann; Paige Hauschild; Stephania Haralabidis; Margaret Steffens; Jamie Neushul; Kiley Neushul; Aria Fischer; Alys Williams; Makenzie Fischer	Canada; Jessica Gaudreault; Krystina Alogbo; Axelle Crevier; Emma Wright; Monika Eggens; Kelly McKee; Joëlle Békhazi; Shae Fournier; Hayley McKelvey; Kyra Christmas; Kindred Paul	Brazil; Victória Chamorro; Diana Abla; Ana Alice Amaral; Gabriela Dias; Mariana Duarte; Ana Beatriz Dias; Samantha Ferreira; Ana Julia Amaral; Letícia Belorio; Viviane Bahia; Mirella Coutinho

== Qualification ==
A total of eight men's teams and eight women's team will qualify to compete at the games in each tournament. The host nation (Peru) qualified in each tournament, along with seven other teams in each tournament according to various criteria. Canada and the United States automatically qualified in each tournament, along with the top three teams at the 2018 Central American and Caribbean Games and top two teams at the 2018 South American Championships.

=== Men ===
Event	Dates	Location	Vacancies	Qualified
Host nation	—N/a	—N/a	1	Peru
Automatic qualification	—N/a	—N/a	2	Canada; United States
2018 Central American and Caribbean Games (CCCAN)	26 July–2 August	(Colombia) Barranquilla	3	Cuba; Puerto Rico; Mexico
2018 South American Championships (CONSANAT)	31 October–4 November	(Peru) Lima	2	Brazil; Argentina
Total			8	

=== Women ===
Event	Dates	Location	Vacancies	Qualified
Host nation	—N/a	—N/a	1	Peru
Automatic qualification	—N/a	—N/a	2	Canada; United States
2018 Central American and Caribbean Games (CCCAN)	26 July–2 August	(Colombia) Barranquilla	3	Cuba; Puerto Rico; Mexico
2018 South American Championships (CONSANAT)	31 October–4 November	(Peru) Lima	2	Brazil; Venezuela
Total			8	

== Participating nations ==
A total of 9 countries qualified water polo teams. Argentina qualified a men's team, Venezuela qualified a women's team, and the other nations qualified both.

- Argentina (11 athletes)
- Brazil (22)
- Canada (22)
- Cuba (22)
- Mexico (22)
- Peru (22)
- Puerto Rico (22)
- United States (22)
- Venezuela (11)
