= 2020 FINA Women's Water Polo World League =

- League: FINA Water Polo World League
- Sport: Water Polo
- Duration: 12 November 2019 to 19 June 2021

Super Final
- Finals champions: United States (14th title)
- Runners-up: Hungary
- Finals MVP: (United States) Maddie Musselman

FINA Women's Water Polo World League seasons
- ← 2019 2022 →

The 2020 FINA Women's Water Polo World League was the 17th edition of the annual women's international water polo tournament. It was played between October 2019 and June 2021 and opened to all women's water polo national teams. After participating in a preliminary round, eight teams qualified to play in a final tournament, called the Super Final, originally from 9–14 June 2020. The tournament was postponed due to the COVID-19 pandemic. In August 2020, it was announced that it would be played in from January to June 2021.

The United States won their seventh consecutive and 14th overall title, after defeating Hungary in the final.

In the world league, there are specific rules that do not allow matches to end in a draw. If teams are level at the end of the 4th quarter of any world league match, the match will be decided by a penalty shootout. The following points will be awarded per match to each team:

- Match won – 3 points
- Match won by penalty – 2 points
- Match lost by penalty – 1 point
- Match lost or forfeited – 0 points

== European qualification round ==
- 12 November 2019 – 27 March 2021

Pos	Team	Pld	W	OTW	OTL	L	GF	GA	GD	Pts	Qualification	Hungary	Spain	Russia	Greece	Netherlands	Italy	France
1	Hungary	6	5	0	1	0	53	32	+21	16	Super Final	—	—	—	—	12–7	5–0	5–0
2	Spain	6	4	1	0	1	78	44	+34	14	Super Final	8–8 (3–2)	—	—	16–12	—	—	18–1
3	Russia	6	3	0	0	3	67	71	−4	9 (Note: Russia 12–9 Greece)	Super Final	9–12	9–17	—	12–9	—	—	—
4	Greece	6	3	0	0	3	52	52	0	9		5–9	—	—	—	—	5–0	5–0
5	Netherlands	6	2	1	0	3	65	68	−3	8		—	12–11	10–15	15–16	—	—	—
6	Italy	6	2	0	1	3	41	48	−7	7		—	0–5	14–9	—	12–12 (2–4)	—	—
7	France	6	0	0	0	6	18	59	−41	0		—	—	9–13	—	0–5	8–13	—

Source: FINA
Rules for classification: 1) points; 2) head-to-head points; 3) head-to-head goal difference; 4) head-to-head number of goals scored; 5) goal difference.

== Inter-Continental Cup ==
- 24 – 30 May 2021, Indianapolis, United States — cancelled

== Super final ==
Super final
Tournament details
- Host country: Greece
- Venue: 1 (in 1 host city)
- Dates: 14–19 June 2021
- Teams: 8 (from 3 confederations)

Tournament statistics
- Matches played: 24
- Goals scored: 601 (25.04 per match)
- Top scorer(s): (Japan) Yumi Arima (23 goals)

Awards
- Best player: (United States) Maddie Musselman
- Best goalkeeper: (United States) Ashleigh Johnson

As host country

- Greece

Qualified teams

- Hungary
- Russia
- Spain

Invited teams

- Canada
- Japan
- Kazakhstan
- United States

=== Preliminary round ===
All times are local (UTC+3).

==== Group A ====
Pos	Team	Pld	W	OTW	OTL	L	GF	GA	GD	Pts
1	Canada	3	3	0	0	0	41	32	+9	9
2	Russia	3	2	0	0	1	45	38	+7	6
3	Hungary	3	1	0	0	2	51	37	+14	3
4	Japan	3	0	0	0	3	33	63	−30	0

Source: Microplustiming
Rules for classification: 1) points; 2) head-to-head points; 3) head-to-head goal difference; 4) head-to-head number of goals scored; 5) goal difference.

14 June 2021; 16:45	Report	Hungary	26–10	Japan	Athens Olympic Aquatic Centre, Athens; Referees: Jaume Teixidó (ESP), Viktor Salnichenko (KAZ)
14 June 2021; 16:45	Report	Score by quarters: 7–1, 5–4, 5–1, 9–4			Athens Olympic Aquatic Centre, Athens; Referees: Jaume Teixidó (ESP), Viktor Salnichenko (KAZ)
14 June 2021; 16:45	Report	Parkes 7	Goals	three players 2	Athens Olympic Aquatic Centre, Athens; Referees: Jaume Teixidó (ESP), Viktor Salnichenko (KAZ)

14 June 2021; 18:30	Report	Canada	12–10	Russia	Athens Olympic Aquatic Centre, Athens; Referees: Georgios Stavridis (GRE), Ursula Wengenroth (SUI)
14 June 2021; 18:30	Report	Score by quarters: 5–1, 2–3, 2–4, 3–2			Athens Olympic Aquatic Centre, Athens; Referees: Georgios Stavridis (GRE), Ursula Wengenroth (SUI)
14 June 2021; 18:30	Report	Sohi 3	Goals	Prokofyeva 4	Athens Olympic Aquatic Centre, Athens; Referees: Georgios Stavridis (GRE), Ursula Wengenroth (SUI)

15 June 2021; 15:00	Report	Canada	16–10	Japan	Athens Olympic Aquatic Centre, Athens; Referees: Frank Ohme (GER), Darren Spiritosanto (USA)
15 June 2021; 15:00	Report	Score by quarters: 4–3, 5–1, 3–3, 4–3			Athens Olympic Aquatic Centre, Athens; Referees: Frank Ohme (GER), Darren Spiritosanto (USA)
15 June 2021; 15:00	Report	Eggens 3	Goals	Arima 5	Athens Olympic Aquatic Centre, Athens; Referees: Frank Ohme (GER), Darren Spiritosanto (USA)

15 June 2021; 16:45	Report	Russia	14–13	Hungary	Athens Olympic Aquatic Centre, Athens; Referees: Michiel Zwart (NED), Jaume Teixidó (ESP)
15 June 2021; 16:45	Report	Score by quarters: 2–2, 4–6, 5–3, 3–2			Athens Olympic Aquatic Centre, Athens; Referees: Michiel Zwart (NED), Jaume Teixidó (ESP)
15 June 2021; 16:45	Report	Ivanova, Karimova 3	Goals	Keszthelyi, Leimeter 4	Athens Olympic Aquatic Centre, Athens; Referees: Michiel Zwart (NED), Jaume Teixidó (ESP)

16 June 2021; 15:00	Report	Hungary	12–13	Canada	Athens Olympic Aquatic Centre, Athens; Referees: Georgios Stavridis (GRE), Viktor Salnichenko (KAZ)
16 June 2021; 15:00	Report	Score by quarters: 2–4, 5–3, 1–3, 4–3			Athens Olympic Aquatic Centre, Athens; Referees: Georgios Stavridis (GRE), Viktor Salnichenko (KAZ)
16 June 2021; 15:00	Report	four players 2	Goals	Christmas 4	Athens Olympic Aquatic Centre, Athens; Referees: Georgios Stavridis (GRE), Viktor Salnichenko (KAZ)

16 June 2021; 18:30	Report	Japan	13–21	Russia	Athens Olympic Aquatic Centre, Athens; Referees: Frank Ohme (GER), Darren Spiritosanto (USA)
16 June 2021; 18:30	Report	Score by quarters: 2–3, 4–3, 2–5, 5–10			Athens Olympic Aquatic Centre, Athens; Referees: Frank Ohme (GER), Darren Spiritosanto (USA)
16 June 2021; 18:30	Report	Arima 8	Goals	Glyzina, Simanovich 5	Athens Olympic Aquatic Centre, Athens; Referees: Frank Ohme (GER), Darren Spiritosanto (USA)

==== Group B ====
Pos	Team	Pld	W	OTW	OTL	L	GF	GA	GD	Pts
1	United States	3	3	0	0	0	54	20	+34	9
2	Spain	3	2	0	0	1	43	37	+6	6
3	Greece (H)	3	1	0	0	2	42	41	+1	3
4	Kazakhstan	3	0	0	0	3	24	65	−41	0

Source: Microplustiming
Rules for classification: 1) points; 2) head-to-head points; 3) head-to-head goal difference; 4) head-to-head number of goals scored; 5) goal difference.
(H) Host

14 June 2021; 15:00	Report	Spain	20–11	Kazakhstan	Athens Olympic Aquatic Centre, Athens; Referees: Nenad Periš (CRO), Frank Ohme (GER)
14 June 2021; 15:00	Report	Score by quarters: 5–5, 7–1, 2–0, 6–5			Athens Olympic Aquatic Centre, Athens; Referees: Nenad Periš (CRO), Frank Ohme (GER)
14 June 2021; 15:00	Report	four players 3	Goals	Turova 4	Athens Olympic Aquatic Centre, Athens; Referees: Nenad Periš (CRO), Frank Ohme (GER)

14 June 2021; 20:15	Report	United States	16–9	Greece	Athens Olympic Aquatic Centre, Athens; Referees: Michiel Zwart (NED), Arkadiy Voevodin (RUS)
14 June 2021; 20:15	Report	Score by quarters: 4–3, 4–2, 4–2, 4–2			Athens Olympic Aquatic Centre, Athens; Referees: Michiel Zwart (NED), Arkadiy Voevodin (RUS)
14 June 2021; 20:15	Report	three players 3	Goals	M. Plevritou 3	Athens Olympic Aquatic Centre, Athens; Referees: Michiel Zwart (NED), Arkadiy Voevodin (RUS)

15 June 2021; 18:30	Report	United States	20–2	Kazakhstan	Athens Olympic Aquatic Centre, Athens; Referees: Ursula Wengenroth (SUI), Asumi Tsuzaki (JPN)
15 June 2021; 18:30	Report	Score by quarters: 9–0, 6–2, 1–0, 4–0			Athens Olympic Aquatic Centre, Athens; Referees: Ursula Wengenroth (SUI), Asumi Tsuzaki (JPN)
15 June 2021; 18:30	Report	Haralabidis 5	Goals	Muravyeva, Roga 1	Athens Olympic Aquatic Centre, Athens; Referees: Ursula Wengenroth (SUI), Asumi Tsuzaki (JPN)

15 June 2021; 20:15	Report	Greece	8–14	Spain	Athens Olympic Aquatic Centre, Athens; Referees: Marie-Claude Deslières (CAN), György Kun (HUN)
15 June 2021; 20:15	Report	Score by quarters: 2–5, 1–3, 3–2, 2–4			Athens Olympic Aquatic Centre, Athens; Referees: Marie-Claude Deslières (CAN), György Kun (HUN)
15 June 2021; 20:15	Report	Tsoukala 3	Goals	Ortiz 4	Athens Olympic Aquatic Centre, Athens; Referees: Marie-Claude Deslières (CAN), György Kun (HUN)

16 June 2021; 16:45	Report	Spain	9–18	United States	Athens Olympic Aquatic Centre, Athens; Referees: Nenad Periš (CRO), Arkadiy Voevodin (RUS)
16 June 2021; 16:45	Report	Score by quarters: 2–4, 3–6, 2–4, 2–4			Athens Olympic Aquatic Centre, Athens; Referees: Nenad Periš (CRO), Arkadiy Voevodin (RUS)
16 June 2021; 16:45	Report	Forca 5	Goals	Fattal 5	Athens Olympic Aquatic Centre, Athens; Referees: Nenad Periš (CRO), Arkadiy Voevodin (RUS)

16 June 2021; 20:15	Report	Kazakhstan	11–25	Greece	Athens Olympic Aquatic Centre, Athens; Referees: Ursula Wengenroth (SUI), Marie-Claude Deslières (CAN)
16 June 2021; 20:15	Report	Score by quarters: 2–8, 1–5, 3–7, 5–5			Athens Olympic Aquatic Centre, Athens; Referees: Ursula Wengenroth (SUI), Marie-Claude Deslières (CAN)
16 June 2021; 20:15	Report	Pochinok, Turova 3	Goals	Eleftheriadou, E. Plevritou 6	Athens Olympic Aquatic Centre, Athens; Referees: Ursula Wengenroth (SUI), Marie-Claude Deslières (CAN)

=== Knockout stage ===
==== Bracket ====
Quarter-finals
17 June
Russia (PSO)	12
Greece	10
17 June
Japan	6
United States	20
17 June
Hungary	10
Spain	8
17 June
Canada	11
Kazakhstan	3

Semi-finals
18 June
Russia	8
United States	17
18 June
Hungary	14
Canada	10

Final
19 June
United States	14
Hungary	8
Third place
19 June
Russia	10
Canada	8

5–8th place bracket

5th–8th place semifinals
18 June
Greece	17
Japan	5
18 June
Spain	20
Kazakhstan	8

Fifth place game
19 June
Greece	9
Spain	12
Seventh place game
19 June
Japan	18
Kazakhstan	10

==== Quarterfinals ====
17 June 2021; 15:00	Report	Hungary	10–8	Spain	Athens Olympic Aquatic Centre, Athens; Referees: Michiel Zwart (NED), Georgios Stavridis (GRE)
17 June 2021; 15:00	Report	Score by quarters: 3–3, 3–1, 2–2, 2–2			Athens Olympic Aquatic Centre, Athens; Referees: Michiel Zwart (NED), Georgios Stavridis (GRE)
17 June 2021; 15:00	Report	Keszthelyi 3	Goals	A. Espar, Tarragó 3	Athens Olympic Aquatic Centre, Athens; Referees: Michiel Zwart (NED), Georgios Stavridis (GRE)

17 June 2021; 16:45	Report	Canada	11–3	Kazakhstan	Athens Olympic Aquatic Centre, Athens; Referees: Asumi Tsuzaki (JPN), Jaume Teixidó (ESP)
17 June 2021; 16:45	Report	Score by quarters: 5–0, 1–1, 1–1, 4–1			Athens Olympic Aquatic Centre, Athens; Referees: Asumi Tsuzaki (JPN), Jaume Teixidó (ESP)
17 June 2021; 16:45	Report	Békhazi, McKelvey 3	Goals	Roga 2	Athens Olympic Aquatic Centre, Athens; Referees: Asumi Tsuzaki (JPN), Jaume Teixidó (ESP)

17 June 2021; 18:30	Report	Japan	6–20	United States	Athens Olympic Aquatic Centre, Athens; Referees: Frank Ohme (GER), Viktor Salnichenko (KAZ)
17 June 2021; 18:30	Report	Score by quarters: 1–4, 1–6, 1–6, 3–4			Athens Olympic Aquatic Centre, Athens; Referees: Frank Ohme (GER), Viktor Salnichenko (KAZ)
17 June 2021; 18:30	Report	Arima 2	Goals	Steffens 4	Athens Olympic Aquatic Centre, Athens; Referees: Frank Ohme (GER), Viktor Salnichenko (KAZ)

17 June 2021; 20:15	Report	Russia	12–10 (PSO)	Greece	Athens Olympic Aquatic Centre, Athens; Referees: György Kun (HUN), Nenad Periš (CRO)
17 June 2021; 20:15	Report	Score by quarters: 2–3, 4–3, 1–2, 1–0 PSO: 4–2			Athens Olympic Aquatic Centre, Athens; Referees: György Kun (HUN), Nenad Periš (CRO)
17 June 2021; 20:15	Report	Bersneva 2	Goals	Eleftheriadou, Tsoukala 3	Athens Olympic Aquatic Centre, Athens; Referees: György Kun (HUN), Nenad Periš (CRO)

==== 5–8th place semifinals ====
18 June 2021; 15:00	Report	Greece	17–5	Japan	Athens Olympic Aquatic Centre, Athens; Referees: Ursula Wengenroth (SUI), Marie-Claude Deslières (CAN)
18 June 2021; 15:00	Report	Score by quarters: 4–2, 5–0, 4–2, 4–1			Athens Olympic Aquatic Centre, Athens; Referees: Ursula Wengenroth (SUI), Marie-Claude Deslières (CAN)
18 June 2021; 15:00	Report	Xenaki 5	Goals	Arima 2	Athens Olympic Aquatic Centre, Athens; Referees: Ursula Wengenroth (SUI), Marie-Claude Deslières (CAN)

18 June 2021; 16:45	Report	Spain	20–8	Kazakhstan	Athens Olympic Aquatic Centre, Athens; Referees: Arkadiy Voevodin (RUS), Darren Spiritosanto (USA)
18 June 2021; 16:45	Report	Score by quarters: 6–3, 6–3, 4–2, 4–0			Athens Olympic Aquatic Centre, Athens; Referees: Arkadiy Voevodin (RUS), Darren Spiritosanto (USA)
18 June 2021; 16:45	Report	Ruiz 5	Goals	Turova, Yeremina 3	Athens Olympic Aquatic Centre, Athens; Referees: Arkadiy Voevodin (RUS), Darren Spiritosanto (USA)

==== Semifinals ====
18 June 2021; 18:30	Report	Russia	8–17	United States	Athens Olympic Aquatic Centre, Athens; Referees: Nenad Periš (CRO), Jaume Teixidó (ESP)
18 June 2021; 18:30	Report	Score by quarters: 3–5, 0–4, 1–4, 4–4			Athens Olympic Aquatic Centre, Athens; Referees: Nenad Periš (CRO), Jaume Teixidó (ESP)
18 June 2021; 18:30	Report	eight players 1	Goals	three players 3	Athens Olympic Aquatic Centre, Athens; Referees: Nenad Periš (CRO), Jaume Teixidó (ESP)

18 June 2021; 20:15	Report	Hungary	14–10	Canada	Athens Olympic Aquatic Centre, Athens; Referees: Frank Ohme (GER), Michiel Zwart (NED)
18 June 2021; 20:15	Report	Score by quarters: 4–3, 3–2, 6–4, 1–1			Athens Olympic Aquatic Centre, Athens; Referees: Frank Ohme (GER), Michiel Zwart (NED)
18 June 2021; 20:15	Report	Keszthelyi 4	Goals	Christmas 3	Athens Olympic Aquatic Centre, Athens; Referees: Frank Ohme (GER), Michiel Zwart (NED)

==== Seventh place game ====
19 June 2021; 15:00	Report	Japan	18–10	Kazakhstan	Athens Olympic Aquatic Centre, Athens; Referees: Michiel Zwart (NED), Darren Spiritosanto (USA)
19 June 2021; 15:00	Report	Score by quarters: 4–3, 4–1, 6–5, 4–1			Athens Olympic Aquatic Centre, Athens; Referees: Michiel Zwart (NED), Darren Spiritosanto (USA)
19 June 2021; 15:00	Report	Arima 5	Goals	Turova 4	Athens Olympic Aquatic Centre, Athens; Referees: Michiel Zwart (NED), Darren Spiritosanto (USA)

==== Fifth place game ====
19 June 2021; 16:45	Report	Greece	9–12	Spain	Athens Olympic Aquatic Centre, Athens; Referees: Asumi Tsuzaki (JPN), Nenad Periš (CRO)
19 June 2021; 16:45	Report	Score by quarters: 1–2, 3–2, 4–4, 1–4			Athens Olympic Aquatic Centre, Athens; Referees: Asumi Tsuzaki (JPN), Nenad Periš (CRO)
19 June 2021; 16:45	Report	Xenaki 3	Goals	García Godoy 4	Athens Olympic Aquatic Centre, Athens; Referees: Asumi Tsuzaki (JPN), Nenad Periš (CRO)

==== Third place game ====
19 June 2021; 18:30	Report	Russia	10–8	Canada	Athens Olympic Aquatic Centre, Athens; Referees: Jaume Teixidó (ESP), György Kun (HUN)
19 June 2021; 18:30	Report	Score by quarters: 4–4, 1–1, 4–0, 1–3			Athens Olympic Aquatic Centre, Athens; Referees: Jaume Teixidó (ESP), György Kun (HUN)
19 June 2021; 18:30	Report	Ivanova 3	Goals	Wright 3	Athens Olympic Aquatic Centre, Athens; Referees: Jaume Teixidó (ESP), György Kun (HUN)

==== Final ====
19 June 2021; 20:15	Report	United States	14–8	Hungary	Athens Olympic Aquatic Centre, Athens; Referees: Georgios Stavridis (GRE), Arkadiy Voevodin (RUS)
19 June 2021; 20:15	Report	Score by quarters: 4–2, 2–1, 3–4, 5–1			Athens Olympic Aquatic Centre, Athens; Referees: Georgios Stavridis (GRE), Arkadiy Voevodin (RUS)
19 June 2021; 20:15	Report	Steffens 4	Goals	three players 2	Athens Olympic Aquatic Centre, Athens; Referees: Georgios Stavridis (GRE), Arkadiy Voevodin (RUS)

=== Final ranking ===
Rank	Team
1	United States
2	Hungary
3	Russia
4	Canada
5	Spain
6	Greece
7	Japan
8	Kazakhstan

2020 FINA Women's Water Polo World League

United States
14th title

Team Roster

Ashleigh Johnson, Maddie Musselman, Melissa Seidemann, Rachel Fattal, Paige Hauschild, Maggie Steffens (C), Stephania Haralabidis, Jamie Neushul, Jordan Raney, Aria Fischer, Kaleigh Gilchrist, Makenzie Fischer, Alys Williams, Amanda Longan. Head coach: Adam Krikorian.

=== Awards ===
The awards were announced on 19 June 2021.

Award	Player
MVP	(United States) Maddie Musselman
Best goalkeeper	(United States) Ashleigh Johnson
Topscorer	(Japan) Yumi Arima
