= Marissa Janssens =

Canadian water polo player (born 1988)

Personal information
- Born: September 9, 1988 (age 37) Montreal, Canada

Sport
- Sport: Water polo
Medal record
Representing Canada
World Championships
Silver medal – second place	2009 Rome	Team
Pan American Games
Silver medal – second place	2015 Toronto	Team

Marissa Janssens (born 9 September 1988) is a water polo player from Canada.

She was a member of the Canada women's national water polo team at the 2009 World Aquatics Championships, and at the 2011 World Aquatics Championships.

She played for Concordia University.

== See also ==
- List of World Aquatics Championships medalists in water polo
