= Illing =

Illing is a surname. Notable people with the surname include:

- Marianne Illing (born 1974), Canadian water polo player
- Peter Illing (1899–1966), Austrian born British film and television actor
- Vivian Illing (1900–2009), at the time of her death in 2009, thought to be the oldest living survivor of the 1906 San Francisco earthquake
