= Axelle Crevier =

Canadian water polo player (born 1997)

Personal information
- National team: Canada women's waterpolo team
- Born: March 22, 1997 (age 29) Montreal, Quebec, Canada
- Height: 172 cm (5 ft 8 in)
Medal record
Representing Canada
Pan American Games
Silver medal – second place	2019 Lima	Team competition
Silver medal – second place	2023 Santiago	Team competition

Axelle Crevier (born March 22, 1997) is a Canadian water polo player. She plays for Canada's national women's water polo team.

== Career highlights ==
=== Youth competitor ===
As a youth competitor, Crevier helped her team win silver at the 2013 Pan American Youth Championships and at the 2014 FINA World Youth Championships the following year. In 2015, the team finished 4th place.

=== Senior competitor ===
Crevier has participated in multiple FINA Water Polo World League championships, helping her team finish 6th place in 2014 and 2015 and 7th place in 2016.

In 2017, she helped the team finish 4th at the FINA World Championships. The team would later go on to win silver in the FINA Water Polo World League.

In 2018, her team ranked 4th at the FINA Water Polo World League and 6th at the FINA World Cup.

Crevier was the youngest player of Canada's women’s water polo team to compete at the Lima 2019 Pan Am Games. Winning silver, the team secured their ticket to the 2020 Tokyo Summer Olympics. She also competed at the 2019 FINA World Championships, where the team finished in 9th place.

== 2020 Tokyo Summer Olympics ==
At the 2020 Summer Olympics in Tokyo, Crevier scored eight goals, with Team Canada finishing seventh after beating Team China 16-7.

== Personal life ==
Crevier's mother Marie-Claude Deslières was on the first Canadian women’s Olympic water polo team at the 2000 Sydney Summer Olympics, and at the 2012 London Summer Olympics was the first woman to referee an Olympic final. Deslières was also one of Canada's international officials at the 2020 Tokyo Olympics.

Crevier is the youngest of three children.
