= Gabriela Gozani =

Brazilian water polo player

Personal information
- Nationality: Brazilian
- Born: 5 August 1991 (age 35)
- Height: 1.68 m (5 ft 6 in)
- Weight: 70 kg (154 lb)

Sport
- Sport: Water polo
- Handedness: Left
- Number: 10
National team
- Years: Team
- 2011: Brazil
Medal record
Women's water polo
Representing Brazil
Pan American Games
Bronze medal – third place	2011 Guadalajara	Team

Gabriela Gozani (born 5 August 1991) was a Brazilian female water polo player. She was part of the Brazil women's national water polo team.

She competed at the 2011 World Aquatics Championships. and won a bronze medal at the 2011 Pan American Games.
