= Andrea Dewar =

Canadian water polo player (born 1979)

Personal information
- Born: July 9, 1979 (age 47) Pointe-Claire, Quebec, Canada
Medal record
Women's water polo
Representing Canada
World Championships
Bronze medal – third place	2001 Fukuoka	Team
Pan American Games
Silver medal – second place	2003 Santo Domingo	Team

Andrea Dewar (born July 9, 1979) is a Canadian water polo player.

She is a graduate of McGill University in physical therapy, 2001.

She was part of the bronze medal-winning women's water polo team at the 2001 world championships in Fukuoka, Japan, 2003 World Aquatics Championships, and 2003 Pan American Games.

== See also ==
- List of World Aquatics Championships medalists in water polo
