= Mirella Coutinho =

Brazilian water polo player

Personal information
- Born: October 5, 1994 (age 31)
- Height: 1.78 m (5 ft 10 in)
- Weight: 68 kg (150 lb)
Medal record
Women's water polo
Representing Brazil
Pan American Games
Bronze medal – third place	2015 Toronto	Team
Bronze medal – third place	2019 Lima	Team

Mirella Coutinho (born 5 October 1994) is a water polo player from Brazil.

She played with the Brazil women's national water polo team at the 2011 World Aquatics Championships.

She played for the University of Hawaii.
