= Rosanna Tomiuk =

Canadian water polo player (born 1984)

Personal information
- Born: October 1, 1984 (age 41) Pointe-Claire, Quebec, Canada
- Education: Loyola Marymount University, University of Southern California
- Occupation(s): Personal and Professional Coach, Corporate Trainer, Motivational Speaker
- Other interests: Singing, Songwriting, Writing
- Website: www.rosannatomiuk.com
Medal record
Women's water polo
Representing Canada
Pan American Games
Silver medal – second place	2007 Rio de Janeiro	Team
Silver medal – second place	2011 Guadalajara	Team
World Aquatics Championships
Silver medal – second place	2009 Roma	Team
Junior World Water Polo Championships
Gold medal – first place	2003 Calgary	Team

Rosanna Tomiuk (born October 1, 1984) is a Canadian water polo player from Quebec turned professional coach. She was a member of the Canada women's national water polo team that claimed the silver medal at the 2007 Pan American Games and the 2011 Pan American Games. They also claimed the silver medal at the 2009 World Aquatics Championships in Rome, Italy.

== Early life and education ==
Tomiuk, who was raised in Montreal, graduated from Loyola Marmount University with a degree in biology and a minor in Music in 2007.

== Career ==
=== Early career ===
Rosanna began swimming at age 10 with the Beaconsfield Bluefins. At 14, she began playing water polo with the Dollard Water Polo Club. By 15, she was playing with the Quebec Team and at 17 she became a member of the Junior Canadian Women's National Water Polo Team. At 18, she began her career with the Canadian Women's Water Polo Team, winning various international medals. She retired from her career as a professional athlete in 2012.

=== 2012–present ===
Rosanna is a certified coach (ACC) with the International Coach Federation. She is also certified in different psychometric assessments: Myers-Briggs Type Indicator, The Birkman Method, Strong Interest Inventory and StrengthsFinder. She works with individuals and teams using a strengths-based approach to create more teamwork and engagement. Rosanna works independently and with a U.S.-based firm, Trybal Performance.

== See also ==
- List of World Aquatics Championships medalists in water polo
