= Alison Braden =

Canadian water polo player (born 1982)

Personal information
- Born: November 26, 1982 (age 43) Calgary, Alberta, Canada
Medal record
Women's water polo
Representing Canada
Pan American Games
Silver medal – second place	2007 Rio de Janeiro	Team
Commonwealth Championships
Silver medal – second place	2006 Perth	Team

Alison Braden (born November 26, 1982, in Calgary) is a female water polo player from Canada. While attending California State University, Long Beach, she lettered on the women's water polo team from 2003–2005, having played 92 games and recorded 96 career assists. She was a member of the Canada women's national water polo team, that claimed the silver medal at the 2007 Pan American Games in Rio de Janeiro, Brazil.
