= Water polo at the 2015 Pan American Games – Women's tournament =

Women's water polo tournament at the 2015 Pan American Games
- Venue: Markham Pan Am Centre
- Dates: July 7 – 15
- Competitors: 104 from 8 nations

Medalists
Gold medal	United States
Silver medal	Canada
Bronze medal	Brazil

Water polo at the
2015 Pan American Games
Tournament
men women
Rosters
men women

The women's tournament of water polo at the 2015 Pan American Games in Toronto, Canada took place between the 7 and 15 of July at the Markham Pan Am Centre in Markham, Ontario. The first through fourth-place finishing teams qualified for the 2016 Women's Water Polo Olympic Games Qualification Tournament to be held in Gouda, Netherlands.

== Qualification ==
A National Olympic Committee may enter one women's team for the water polo competition. Canada, the host nation along with seven other countries qualified through regional competitions.

Event	Date	Location	Vacancies	Qualified
Host Nation	—	—	1	Canada
Qualified automatically	—	—	1	United States
2014 South American Championship	October 7–11	(Argentina) Mar del Plata	3	Brazil; Venezuela; Argentina
2014 Central American and Caribbean Games	November 22–29	(Mexico) Veracruz	3	Puerto Rico; Cuba; Mexico
TOTAL			8	

== Format ==
- Eight teams are split into 2 preliminary round groups of 4 teams each. The top 2 teams from each group qualify for the knockout stage.
- The third and fourth placed each group will crossover and play each other in the fifth to eighth place bracket.
- In the semifinals, the matchups are as follows: A1 vs. B2 and B1 vs. A2
- The winning teams from the semifinals play for the gold medal. The losing teams compete for the bronze medal.

== Preliminary round ==
All times are local Eastern Daylight Time (UTC−5)

=== Group A ===
Team	Pld	W	D	L	GF	GA	GD	Pts	Qualification
United States	3	3	0	0	73	9	+64	6	Qualified for the semifinals
Cuba	3	2	0	1	24	30	−6	4	Qualified for the semifinals
Argentina	3	1	0	2	16	48	−32	2	
Mexico	3	0	0	3	20	46	−26	0	

7 July 2015; 10:08	Report	Mexico	3–25	United States	Markham Pan Am Centre; Referees: Hugo Paredes (ECU), João Cardenuto (BRA)
7 July 2015; 10:08	Report	Score by quarters: 0–6, 1–10, 0–7, 2–2			Markham Pan Am Centre; Referees: Hugo Paredes (ECU), João Cardenuto (BRA)
7 July 2015; 10:08	Report	Rios 2	Goals	Steffens, Grossman 4	Markham Pan Am Centre; Referees: Hugo Paredes (ECU), João Cardenuto (BRA)

8 July 2015; 08:08	Report	Mexico	8–10	Argentina	Markham Pan Am Centre; Referees: João Cardenuto (BRA), Reynel Castillo (PUR)
8 July 2015; 08:08	Report	Score by quarters: 1–2, 1–2, 3–2, 3–4			Markham Pan Am Centre; Referees: João Cardenuto (BRA), Reynel Castillo (PUR)
8 July 2015; 08:08	Report	Castro, Morales 2	Goals	M De Virgilio 4, Bertaina 2, Font 2, Hatcher 1, R De Virgilio 1	Markham Pan Am Centre; Referees: João Cardenuto (BRA), Reynel Castillo (PUR)

8 July 2015; 10:08	Report	United States	18–3	Cuba	Markham Pan Am Centre; Referees: Edmundo Rodrigues (BRA), William Mackay (CAN)
8 July 2015; 10:08	Report	Score by quarters: 4–1, 4–0, 6–1, 4–1			Markham Pan Am Centre; Referees: Edmundo Rodrigues (BRA), William Mackay (CAN)
8 July 2015; 10:08	Report	Steffens, Fischer 3	Goals	3 players 1	Markham Pan Am Centre; Referees: Edmundo Rodrigues (BRA), William Mackay (CAN)

9 July 2015; 10:08	Report	Cuba	10–3	Argentina	Markham Pan Am Centre; Referees: Arnoldo Zambrano (VEN), Stephane Roy (CAN)
9 July 2015; 10:08	Report	Score by quarters: 1–0, 3–0, 3–1, 3–2			Markham Pan Am Centre; Referees: Arnoldo Zambrano (VEN), Stephane Roy (CAN)
9 July 2015; 10:08	Report	Bravo, Bernal 3	Goals	Hatcher 1, M De Virgilio 1, R De Virgilio 1	Markham Pan Am Centre; Referees: Arnoldo Zambrano (VEN), Stephane Roy (CAN)

11 July 2015; 08:08	Report	United States	30–3	Argentina	Markham Pan Am Centre; Referees: Hugo Parades (VEN), Edmundo Rodrigues (BRA)
11 July 2015; 08:08	Report	Score by quarters: 8-0, 6-1, 6-1, 10-1			Markham Pan Am Centre; Referees: Hugo Parades (VEN), Edmundo Rodrigues (BRA)
11 July 2015; 08:08	Report	Clark 7	Goals	Font 2, Hatcher 1	Markham Pan Am Centre; Referees: Hugo Parades (VEN), Edmundo Rodrigues (BRA)

11 July 2015; 10:08	Report	Mexico	9–11	Cuba	Markham Pan Am Centre; Referees: Reynel Castillo (PUR), William Mackay (CAN)
11 July 2015; 10:08	Report	Score by quarters: 4-4, 2-1, 2-3, 1-3			Markham Pan Am Centre; Referees: Reynel Castillo (PUR), William Mackay (CAN)
11 July 2015; 10:08	Report	Murrieta 3	Goals	Ortiz 2	Markham Pan Am Centre; Referees: Reynel Castillo (PUR), William Mackay (CAN)

=== Group B ===
Team	Pld	W	D	L	GF	GA	GD	Pts	Qualification
Canada	3	2	1	0	41	16	+25	5	Qualified for the semifinals
Brazil	3	2	1	0	42	18	+24	5	Qualified for the semifinals
Venezuela	3	0	1	2	16	44	−28	1	
Puerto Rico	3	0	1	2	26	47	−21	1	

7 July 2015; 08:08	Report	Venezuela	11–11	Puerto Rico	Markham Pan Am Centre; Referees: Humberto Navarro (USA), Guillermo Grgicevic (ARG)
7 July 2015; 08:08	Report	Score by quarters: 3–2, 5–3, 1–5, 2–1			Markham Pan Am Centre; Referees: Humberto Navarro (USA), Guillermo Grgicevic (ARG)
7 July 2015; 08:08	Report	Herrera 3	Goals	Montero 4	Markham Pan Am Centre; Referees: Humberto Navarro (USA), Guillermo Grgicevic (ARG)

7 July 2015; 12:08	Report	Canada	7–7	Brazil	Markham Pan Am Centre; Referees: Diego Garibaldi (ARG), Daniel Vazquez (MEX)
7 July 2015; 12:08	Report	Score by quarters: 1–2, 2–1, 2–3, 2–1			Markham Pan Am Centre; Referees: Diego Garibaldi (ARG), Daniel Vazquez (MEX)
7 July 2015; 12:08	Report	7 players 1	Goals	3 players 2	Markham Pan Am Centre; Referees: Diego Garibaldi (ARG), Daniel Vazquez (MEX)

8 July 2015; 12:08	Report	Venezuela	4–15	Canada	Markham Pan Am Centre; Referees: Claudia Aguilar (MEX), Mark Maretzki (USA).
8 July 2015; 12:08	Report	Score by quarters: 0–4, 1–3, 1–4, 2–4			Markham Pan Am Centre; Referees: Claudia Aguilar (MEX), Mark Maretzki (USA).
8 July 2015; 12:08	Report	4 players 1	Goals	Perreault, Robinson 3	Markham Pan Am Centre; Referees: Claudia Aguilar (MEX), Mark Maretzki (USA).

9 July 2015; 08:08	Report	Venezuela	1–18	Brazil	Markham Pan Am Centre; Referees: Thomas Molnar (HUN), Daniel Vazquez (MEX)
9 July 2015; 08:08	Report	Score by quarters: 0–4, 0–2, 1–7, 0–5			Markham Pan Am Centre; Referees: Thomas Molnar (HUN), Daniel Vazquez (MEX)
9 July 2015; 08:08	Report	Marin 1	Goals	Chiappini 7	Markham Pan Am Centre; Referees: Thomas Molnar (HUN), Daniel Vazquez (MEX)

9 July 2015; 12:08	Report	Canada	19–5	Puerto Rico	Markham Pan Am Centre; Referees: Diego Garibaldi (ARG), Claudia Aguilar (MEX)
9 July 2015; 12:08	Report	Score by quarters: 4–1, 4–2, 5–0, 6–2			Markham Pan Am Centre; Referees: Diego Garibaldi (ARG), Claudia Aguilar (MEX)
9 July 2015; 12:08	Report	Robinson 4	Goals	Delgado 2	Markham Pan Am Centre; Referees: Diego Garibaldi (ARG), Claudia Aguilar (MEX)

11 July 2015; 12:08	Report	Brazil	17–10	Puerto Rico	Markham Pan Am Centre; Referees: Jaume Teixido (SPA), Mark Maretzki (USA).
11 July 2015; 12:08	Report	Score by quarters: 4-2, 3-5, 5-1, 5-2			Markham Pan Am Centre; Referees: Jaume Teixido (SPA), Mark Maretzki (USA).
11 July 2015; 12:08	Report	Badocco 4	Goals	Montero 3	Markham Pan Am Centre; Referees: Jaume Teixido (SPA), Mark Maretzki (USA).

== Classification stage ==
=== Bracket ===
Semi-finals
July 12
Argentina	6
Puerto Rico	14
July 12
Mexico	10
Venezuela	8

Fifth place
July 14
Puerto Rico	12
Mexico	11
Seventh place
July 14
Argentina	8
Venezuela	9

=== Fifth to Eighth place ===
12 July 2015; 12:00	Report	Argentina	6–14	Puerto Rico	Markham Pan Am Centre; Referees: Joao Cardenuto (BRA), Humberto Navarro (USA)
12 July 2015; 12:00	Report	Score by quarters: 1-3, 2-4, 0-3, 3-4			Markham Pan Am Centre; Referees: Joao Cardenuto (BRA), Humberto Navarro (USA)
12 July 2015; 12:00	Report	Font 3, Comba 2, Hatcher 1	Goals	Medina 5	Markham Pan Am Centre; Referees: Joao Cardenuto (BRA), Humberto Navarro (USA)

12 July 2015; 14:00	Report	Mexico	10–8	Venezuela	Markham Pan Am Centre; Referees: Stéphane Roy (CAN), Edmundo Rodrigues (BRA)
12 July 2015; 14:00	Report	Score by quarters: 3-2, 3-2, 3-2, 2-1			Markham Pan Am Centre; Referees: Stéphane Roy (CAN), Edmundo Rodrigues (BRA)
12 July 2015; 14:00	Report	Castro 3	Goals	Hernandez Cabrera 3	Markham Pan Am Centre; Referees: Stéphane Roy (CAN), Edmundo Rodrigues (BRA)

=== Seventh place match ===
14 July 2015; 12:00	Report	Argentina	8–9	Venezuela	Markham Pan Am Centre; Referees: João Cardenuto (BRA), Constantino Castro (CUB)
14 July 2015; 12:00	Report	Score by quarters: 0-1, 1-2, 2-1, 2-1			Markham Pan Am Centre; Referees: João Cardenuto (BRA), Constantino Castro (CUB)
14 July 2015; 12:00	Report	R De Virgilio 2	Goals	Coronel 2	Markham Pan Am Centre; Referees: João Cardenuto (BRA), Constantino Castro (CUB)

=== Fifth place match ===
14 July 2015; 14:00	Report	Puerto Rico	12–11	Mexico	Markham Pan Am Centre; Referees: Juan Menendez (CUB), Diego Garibaldi (ARG)
14 July 2015; 14:00	Report	Score by quarters: 2–3, 4–3, 4–1, 2–4			Markham Pan Am Centre; Referees: Juan Menendez (CUB), Diego Garibaldi (ARG)
14 July 2015; 14:00	Report	Nazario 4	Goals	Castro 4	Markham Pan Am Centre; Referees: Juan Menendez (CUB), Diego Garibaldi (ARG)

== Medal round ==
=== Bracket ===
Semi-finals
July 12
United States	16
Brazil	3
July 12
Cuba	7
Canada	14

Final
July 14
United States	13
Canada	4
Third place
July 14
Brazil	9
Cuba	6

=== Semifinals ===
12 July 2015; 18:00	Report	Cuba	7–14	Canada	Markham Pan Am Centre; Referees: Reynel Castillo (PUR), Diego Garibaldi (ARG)
12 July 2015; 18:00	Report	Score by quarters: 1-3, 1-5, 3-2, 2-4			Markham Pan Am Centre; Referees: Reynel Castillo (PUR), Diego Garibaldi (ARG)
12 July 2015; 18:00	Report	Bernal 2	Goals	Eggens, Robinson 3	Markham Pan Am Centre; Referees: Reynel Castillo (PUR), Diego Garibaldi (ARG)

12 July 2015; 20:00	Report	United States	16–3	Brazil	Markham Pan Am Centre; Referees: Thomas Molnar (HUN), Jaume Teixido (SPA)
12 July 2015; 20:00	Report	Score by quarters: 3-1, 6-1, 5-0, 2-1			Markham Pan Am Centre; Referees: Thomas Molnar (HUN), Jaume Teixido (SPA)
12 July 2015; 20:00	Report	Steffens 3	Goals	Palaro 1	Markham Pan Am Centre; Referees: Thomas Molnar (HUN), Jaume Teixido (SPA)

=== Bronze medal match ===
14 July 2015; 18:00	Report	(bronze) Brazil	9–6	Cuba	Markham Pan Am Centre; Referees: Mark Maretzki (USA), William Mackay (CAN)
14 July 2015; 18:00	Report	Score by quarters: 2-0, 2-2, 2-2, 3-2			Markham Pan Am Centre; Referees: Mark Maretzki (USA), William Mackay (CAN)
14 July 2015; 18:00	Report	Chiappini 6	Goals	Ortiz 2	Markham Pan Am Centre; Referees: Mark Maretzki (USA), William Mackay (CAN)

=== Gold medal match ===
14 July 2015; 20:00	Report	(gold) United States	13–4	Canada (silver)	Markham Pan Am Centre; Referees: Thomas Molnar (HUN), Jaume Teixido (SPA)
14 July 2015; 20:00	Report	Score by quarters: 3-2, 3-1, 4-0, 3-1			Markham Pan Am Centre; Referees: Thomas Molnar (HUN), Jaume Teixido (SPA)
14 July 2015; 20:00	Report	2 players 4	Goals	Eggens 2	Markham Pan Am Centre; Referees: Thomas Molnar (HUN), Jaume Teixido (SPA)

== Final standings ==
Rank	Team	Record	Olympic Qualification
1st place, gold medalist(s)	United States	5 – 0 – 0	2016 Women's Water Polo Olympic Games Qualification Tournament
2nd place, silver medalist(s)	Canada	3 – 1 – 1	2016 Women's Water Polo Olympic Games Qualification Tournament
3rd place, bronze medalist(s)	Brazil	3 – 1 – 1	Already qualified as a host
4	Cuba	2 – 0 – 3	
5	Puerto Rico	2 – 1 – 2	
6	Mexico	1 – 0 – 3	
7	Venezuela	1 – 1 – 3	
8	Argentina	1 – 0 – 4	
