= Water polo at the 2011 Pan American Games – Women's tournament =

Women's water polo tournament at the 2011 Pan American Games
- Venue: Scotiabank Aquatics Center
- Dates: October 23 – October 28
- Competitors: 104 from 8 nations

Medalists
Gold medal	United States
Silver medal	Canada
Bronze medal	Brazil

The women's tournament of water polo at the 2011 Pan American Games in Guadalajara, Mexico took place from October 23 to October 28, when the United States defeated Canada 27–26 in a penalty shootout for the gold medal. All games were held at the Scotiabank Aquatics Center. The defending champions are the United States. The winner of the competition has qualified directly for the 2012 Summer Olympics in London, Great Britain, while the second through fourth-place finishing teams have qualified for the 2012 Women's Water Polo Olympic Games Qualification Tournament that was held in Trieste, Italy.

== Qualification ==
A National Olympic Committee may enter one women's team for the water polo competition. Mexico, the host nation along with seven other countries qualified through regional competitions.

Event	Date	Location	Vacancies	Qualified
Host Nation	–	–	1	Mexico
2010 South American Games	March 20–25, 2010	(Colombia) Medellín	3	Brazil; Venezuela; Argentina
2010 Central American and Caribbean Games	July 26–31, 2010	(Puerto Rico) Mayagüez	1	Puerto Rico
Qualified Automatically	–		1	Cuba ^{1}
Zone 3	–	–	1	United States
Zone 4	–	–	1	Canada
TOTAL			8	

^1 The top two teams from the Central American and Caribbean Games were to be qualified, but only 1 team (Puerto Rico) could qualify. Cuba did not compete in this tournament and has received a wildcard.

== Format ==
- Eight teams are split into 2 preliminary round groups of 4 teams each. The top 2 teams from each group qualify for the knockout stage.
- The third and fourth placed each group will crossover and play each other in the fifth to eighth place bracket.
- In the semifinals, the matchups are as follows: A1 vs. B2 and B1 vs. A2
- The winning teams from the semifinals play for the gold medal. The losing teams compete for the bronze medal.

== Preliminary round ==
All times are local Central Daylight Time (UTC−5)

Qualified for the semifinals

=== Group A ===
Team	GP	W	D	L	GF	GA	GD	Pts
Canada	3	3	0	0	54	15	+39	6
Brazil	3	2	0	1	22	21	+1	4
Mexico	3	1	0	2	31	33	-2	2
Venezuela	3	0	0	3	12	50	-38	0

October 23, 2011; 11:00	Report	Brazil	8–5	Mexico	Scotiabank Aquatics Center, Guadalajara; Referees: Redding (USA), Bohm (AHO)
October 23, 2011; 11:00	Report	Score by quarters: 2 – 2, 3– 2, 2 – 0, 1 – 1			Scotiabank Aquatics Center, Guadalajara; Referees: Redding (USA), Bohm (AHO)
October 23, 2011; 11:00	Report	Oliveira, Beer 2	Goals	Orozco 4	Scotiabank Aquatics Center, Guadalajara; Referees: Redding (USA), Bohm (AHO)

October 23, 2011; 12:15	Report	Venezuela	2–23	Canada	Scotiabank Aquatics Center, Guadalajara; Referees: Madera (CUB), Lopez (COL)
October 23, 2011; 12:15	Report	Score by quarters: 1 – 5, 0 – 6, 1 – 6, 0 – 6			Scotiabank Aquatics Center, Guadalajara; Referees: Madera (CUB), Lopez (COL)
October 23, 2011; 12:15	Report	Alas, Galue, 1	Goals	Alogbo, 5	Scotiabank Aquatics Center, Guadalajara; Referees: Madera (CUB), Lopez (COL)

October 24, 2011; 9:45	Report	Brazil	4–13	Canada	Scotiabank Aquatics Center, Guadalajara; Referees: Madera (CUB) Arnoldo (VEN)
October 24, 2011; 9:45	Report	Score by quarters: 0 – 2, 1 – 3, 0 – 5, 3 – 3			Scotiabank Aquatics Center, Guadalajara; Referees: Madera (CUB) Arnoldo (VEN)
October 24, 2011; 9:45	Report	4 players, 1	Goals	3 players, 2	Scotiabank Aquatics Center, Guadalajara; Referees: Madera (CUB) Arnoldo (VEN)

October 24, 2011; 11:00	Report	Venezuela	7–17	Mexico	Scotiabank Aquatics Center, Guadalajara; Referees: Valcarce (ARG), Maretzki (USA)
October 24, 2011; 11:00	Report	Score by quarters: 1 – 5, 3 – 5, 2 – 3, 1 – 4			Scotiabank Aquatics Center, Guadalajara; Referees: Valcarce (ARG), Maretzki (USA)
October 24, 2011; 11:00	Report	Alas 2	Goals	Orozco 5	Scotiabank Aquatics Center, Guadalajara; Referees: Valcarce (ARG), Maretzki (USA)

October 25, 2011; 9:45	Report	Brazil	10–3	Venezuela	Scotiabank Aquatics Center, Guadalajara; Referees: Bohm (AHO), Menendez (CUB)
October 25, 2011; 9:45	Report	Score by quarters: 4 – 0, 2 – 2, 2 – 0, 2 – 1			Scotiabank Aquatics Center, Guadalajara; Referees: Bohm (AHO), Menendez (CUB)
October 25, 2011; 9:45	Report	Oliveira, Beer 2	Goals	Alas 2	Scotiabank Aquatics Center, Guadalajara; Referees: Bohm (AHO), Menendez (CUB)

October 25, 2011; 11:00	Report	Mexico	9–18	Canada	Scotiabank Aquatics Center, Guadalajara; Referees: Redding (USA) Valcarce (ARG)
October 25, 2011; 11:00	Report	Score by quarters: 2 – 6, 3 – 6, 3 – 4, 1 – 2			Scotiabank Aquatics Center, Guadalajara; Referees: Redding (USA) Valcarce (ARG)
October 25, 2011; 11:00	Report	Carrillo 2	Goals	Alogbo, 6	Scotiabank Aquatics Center, Guadalajara; Referees: Redding (USA) Valcarce (ARG)

=== Group B ===
Team	GP	W	D	L	GF	GA	GD	Pts
United States	3	3	0	0	63	7	+56	6
Cuba	3	2	0	1	22	36	-12	4
Puerto Rico	3	1	0	2	28	43	-15	2
Argentina	3	0	0	3	11	38	-27	0

October 23, 2011; 8:30	Report	Argentina	0–20	United States	Scotiabank Aquatics Center, Guadalajara; Referees: Mejia (MEX), Dester (BRA)
October 23, 2011; 8:30	Report	Score by quarters: 0 – 4, 0 – 6, 0 – 3, 0 – 7			Scotiabank Aquatics Center, Guadalajara; Referees: Mejia (MEX), Dester (BRA)
October 23, 2011; 8:30	Report		Goals	Dries 4	Scotiabank Aquatics Center, Guadalajara; Referees: Mejia (MEX), Dester (BRA)

October 23, 2011; 9:45	Report	Puerto Rico	12–13	Cuba	Scotiabank Aquatics Center, Guadalajara; Referees: Burt (CAN), Arnoldo (VEN)
October 23, 2011; 9:45	Report	Score by quarters: 4 – 4, 2 – 3, 3 – 2, 3 – 4			Scotiabank Aquatics Center, Guadalajara; Referees: Burt (CAN), Arnoldo (VEN)
October 23, 2011; 9:45	Report	Medina 4	Goals	Hernandez, Gutierrez 3	Scotiabank Aquatics Center, Guadalajara; Referees: Burt (CAN), Arnoldo (VEN)

October 24, 2011; 8:30	Report	Argentina	5–6	Cuba	Scotiabank Aquatics Center, Guadalajara; Referees: Dykman (CAN), Callejas (MEX)
October 24, 2011; 8:30	Report	Score by quarters: 0 – 2, 2 – 1, 2 – 1, 1 – 2			Scotiabank Aquatics Center, Guadalajara; Referees: Dykman (CAN), Callejas (MEX)
October 24, 2011; 8:30	Report	Font 2	Goals	Bernal 2	Scotiabank Aquatics Center, Guadalajara; Referees: Dykman (CAN), Callejas (MEX)

October 24, 2011; 12:15	Report	Puerto Rico	4–24	United States	Scotiabank Aquatics Center, Guadalajara; Referees: Lopez (COL), Werner (BRA)
October 24, 2011; 12:15	Report	Score by quarters: 0 – 8, 2 – 7, 1 – 7, 1 – 2			Scotiabank Aquatics Center, Guadalajara; Referees: Lopez (COL), Werner (BRA)
October 24, 2011; 12:15	Report	García, Ralat 2	Goals	Craig 4	Scotiabank Aquatics Center, Guadalajara; Referees: Lopez (COL), Werner (BRA)

October 25, 2011; 8:30	Report	Argentina	6–12	Puerto Rico	Scotiabank Aquatics Center, Guadalajara; Referees: Mejia (MEX) Dykman (CAN)
October 25, 2011; 8:30	Report	Score by quarters: 3 – 1, 0 – 3, 3 – 4, 0 – 4			Scotiabank Aquatics Center, Guadalajara; Referees: Mejia (MEX) Dykman (CAN)
October 25, 2011; 8:30	Report	Ledoux 2	Goals	Ralat, Ortiz 3	Scotiabank Aquatics Center, Guadalajara; Referees: Mejia (MEX) Dykman (CAN)

October 25, 2011; 12:15	Report	United States	19–3	Cuba	Scotiabank Aquatics Center, Guadalajara; Referees: Lopez (COL), Paredes (VEN)
October 25, 2011; 12:15	Report	Score by quarters: 5 – 0, 4 – 1, 3 – 1, 7 – 1			Scotiabank Aquatics Center, Guadalajara; Referees: Lopez (COL), Paredes (VEN)
October 25, 2011; 12:15	Report	Seidemann 5	Goals	3 players, 1	Scotiabank Aquatics Center, Guadalajara; Referees: Lopez (COL), Paredes (VEN)

== Elimination stage ==
=== Crossover ===
October 26, 2011; 12:30	Report	Venezuela	6–11	Puerto Rico	Scotiabank Aquatics Center, Guadalajara; Referees: Dykman (CAN), Madera (CUB)
October 26, 2011; 12:30	Report	Score by quarters: 0 – 2, 2 – 3, 2 – 3, 2 – 3			Scotiabank Aquatics Center, Guadalajara; Referees: Dykman (CAN), Madera (CUB)
October 26, 2011; 12:30	Report	6 players, 1	Goals	Medina, Ortiz 3	Scotiabank Aquatics Center, Guadalajara; Referees: Dykman (CAN), Madera (CUB)

October 26, 2011; 14:00	Report	Argentina	9–11	Mexico	Scotiabank Aquatics Center, Guadalajara; Referees: Dester (BRA), Maretzki (USA)
October 26, 2011; 14:00	Report	Score by quarters: 3 – 3, 2 – 3, 2 – 5, 2 – 0			Scotiabank Aquatics Center, Guadalajara; Referees: Dester (BRA), Maretzki (USA)
October 26, 2011; 14:00	Report	Ledoux 3	Goals	Campos 3	Scotiabank Aquatics Center, Guadalajara; Referees: Dester (BRA), Maretzki (USA)

=== Seventh place match ===
October 28, 2011; 12:30	Report	Venezuela	6–8 (OT)	Argentina	Scotiabank Aquatics Center, Guadalajara; Referees: Maretzki (USA), Lopez (COL)
October 28, 2011; 12:30	Report	Score by quarters: 2 – 2, 1 – 2, 1 – 2, 2 – 0 OT: 0 – 2			Scotiabank Aquatics Center, Guadalajara; Referees: Maretzki (USA), Lopez (COL)
October 28, 2011; 12:30	Report	Carangelo 3	Goals	De Virgilio 3	Scotiabank Aquatics Center, Guadalajara; Referees: Maretzki (USA), Lopez (COL)

=== Fifth place match ===
October 28, 2011; 14:00	Report	Puerto Rico	15–13	Mexico	Scotiabank Aquatics Center, Guadalajara; Referees: Burt (CAN), Werner (BRA)
October 28, 2011; 14:00	Report	Score by quarters: 2 – 3, 5 – 3, 5 – 4, 3 – 3			Scotiabank Aquatics Center, Guadalajara; Referees: Burt (CAN), Werner (BRA)
October 28, 2011; 14:00	Report	Medina 5	Goals	Orozco 3	Scotiabank Aquatics Center, Guadalajara; Referees: Burt (CAN), Werner (BRA)

=== Bracket ===
Semi-finals
October 26
Brazil	1
United States	13
October 26
Cuba	9
Canada	15

Final
October 28
United States	27
Canada	26
Third place
October 28
Brazil	9
Cuba	8

=== Semifinals ===
October 26, 2011; 15:30	Report	Brazil	1–13	United States	Scotiabank Aquatics Center, Guadalajara; Referees: Parades (VEN), Stampalija (CRO)
October 26, 2011; 15:30	Report	Score by quarters: 0 – 3, 0 – 1, 0 – 3, 1 – 6			Scotiabank Aquatics Center, Guadalajara; Referees: Parades (VEN), Stampalija (CRO)
October 26, 2011; 15:30	Report	Canetti 1	Goals	Mathewson 5	Scotiabank Aquatics Center, Guadalajara; Referees: Parades (VEN), Stampalija (CRO)

October 26, 2011; 17:00	Report	Cuba	9–15	Canada	Scotiabank Aquatics Center, Guadalajara; Referees: Valcarce (ARG), Bohm (AHO)
October 26, 2011; 17:00	Report	Score by quarters: 2 – 4, 1 – 4, 3 – 2, 3 – 5			Scotiabank Aquatics Center, Guadalajara; Referees: Valcarce (ARG), Bohm (AHO)
October 26, 2011; 17:00	Report	Hernandez 6	Goals	Radu 4	Scotiabank Aquatics Center, Guadalajara; Referees: Valcarce (ARG), Bohm (AHO)

=== Bronze medal match ===
October 28, 2011; 15:30	Report	Brazil	9–8	Cuba	Scotiabank Aquatics Center, Guadalajara; Referees: Bohm (AHO), Moller (ARG)
October 28, 2011; 15:30	Report	Score by quarters: 2 – 1, 1 – 2, 4 – 3, 2 – 2			Scotiabank Aquatics Center, Guadalajara; Referees: Bohm (AHO), Moller (ARG)
October 28, 2011; 15:30	Report	Canetti, Oliveira 3	Goals	Gutierrez 3	Scotiabank Aquatics Center, Guadalajara; Referees: Bohm (AHO), Moller (ARG)

=== Gold medal match ===
October 28, 2011; 17:00	Report	United States	27–26 (OT)	Canada	Scotiabank Aquatics Center, Guadalajara; Referees: Stampalija (CRO), Menendez (CUB)
October 28, 2011; 17:00	Report	Score by quarters: 1 – 1, 1 – 4, 2 – 2, 4 – 1 OT: 0 – 0, PSO: 19 – 18			Scotiabank Aquatics Center, Guadalajara; Referees: Stampalija (CRO), Menendez (CUB)
October 28, 2011; 17:00	Report	Mathewson 4	Goals	Csikos 5	Scotiabank Aquatics Center, Guadalajara; Referees: Stampalija (CRO), Menendez (CUB)

2011 Pan American Games winners

United States
3rd title

== Final standings ==
Rank	Team	Record
Gold medal	United States	5 – 0 – 0
Silver medal	Canada	4 – 0 – 1
Bronze medal	Brazil	3 – 0 – 2
4	Cuba	2 – 0 – 3
5	Puerto Rico	3 – 0 – 2
6	Mexico	2 – 0 – 3
7	Argentina	1 – 0 – 4
8	Venezuela	0 – 0 – 5
