= Melissa Collins =

Canadian water polo player (born 1976)

Personal information
- Born: September 25, 1976 (age 49) Montreal, Quebec, Canada
Medal record
Women's water polo
Representing Canada
World Championships
| Bronze medal – third place | 2001 Fukuoka | Team |
Pan American Games
| Silver medal – second place | 2003 Santo Domingo | Team |

Melissa Collins (born September 25, 1976) is a Canadian water polo player. She was part of the fifth place women's water polo team at the 2000 Summer Olympics and was part of the bronze medal winning women's water polo team at the 2001 World Championships in Fukuoka, Japan.

Born in Montreal, Quebec, she is a student at McGill University as a dietetics and human nutrition graduate student and received her BSc(PT)'98.

In the 2003 World Aquatic Championships, she helped Canada reach the final eight in the tournament. She also was part of the 2004 Athens Summer Games.

== See also ==
- Canada women's Olympic water polo team records and statistics
- List of World Aquatics Championships medalists in water polo
