= Water polo at the 2005 World Aquatics Championships – Women's tournament =

2005 World Water Polo Championship
- 11th FINA World Aquatics Championships
- Location: Canada
- Date: 17–29 July
- Category: 2005 World Aquatics Championships

The 2005 Women's World Water Polo Championship was the seventh edition of the women's water polo tournament at the World Aquatics Championships, organised by the world governing body in aquatics, the FINA. The tournament was held at the Pavillon des Baigneurs on Île Sainte-Hélène from 17 to 29 July 2005, and was incorporated into the 2005 World Aquatics Championships in Montréal, Canada.

== Teams ==
Group A

- Canada
- Cuba
- Italy
- Venezuela

Group B

- China
- Hungary
- Spain
- United States

Group C

- Greece
- New Zealand
- Russia
- Uzbekistan

Group D

- Australia
- Brazil
- Germany
- Netherlands

== Preliminary round ==
=== Group A ===
Pos	Team	Pts	Pld	W	D	L	GF	GA	GD
1	Canada	6	3	3	0	0	30	14	+16
2	Italy	4	3	2	0	1	34	19	+15
3	Cuba	1	3	0	1	2	17	29	−12
4	Venezuela	1	3	0	1	2	13	32	−19

Venezuela	6 – 6	Cuba
Canada	8 – 7	Italy

Italy	13 – 6	Cuba
Venezuela	2 – 12	Canada

Venezuela	5 – 14	Italy
Canada	10 – 5	Cuba

=== Group B ===
Pos	Team	Pts	Pld	W	D	L	GF	GA	GD
1	Hungary	6	3	3	0	0	35	17	+18
2	United States	3	3	1	1	1	32	17	+15
3	Spain	3	3	1	1	1	26	17	+9
4	China	0	3	0	0	3	9	51	−42

China	4 – 18	Hungary
Spain	6 – 6	United States

Hungary	9 – 8	United States
Spain	15 – 3	China

China	2 – 18	United States
Spain	5 – 8	Hungary

=== Group C ===
Pos	Team	Pts	Pld	W	D	L	GF	GA	GD
1	Russia	5	3	2	1	0	35	5	+30
2	Greece	5	3	2	1	0	27	12	+15
3	New Zealand	2	3	1	0	2	14	26	−12
4	Uzbekistan	0	3	0	0	3	8	41	−33

Russia	18 – 0	Uzbekistan
Greece	9 – 4	New Zealand

New Zealand	9 – 4	Uzbekistan
Russia	4 – 4	Greece

Russia	13 – 1	New Zealand
Greece	14 – 4	Uzbekistan

=== Group D ===
Pos	Team	Pts	Pld	W	D	L	GF	GA	GD
1	Australia	6	3	3	0	0	35	8	+27
2	Germany	3	3	1	1	1	15	27	−12
3	Netherlands	2	3	1	0	2	15	22	−7
4	Brazil	1	3	0	1	2	16	24	−8

Australia	15 – 2	Germany
Brazil	6 – 7	Netherlands

Netherlands	6 – 7	Germany
Australia	11 – 4	Brazil

Australia	9 – 2	Netherlands
Brazil	6 – 6	Germany

== Second round ==
- Saturday July 23, 2005

Italy	9 – 6	Spain
Cuba	3 – 14	United States
Greece	7 – 4	Netherlands
New Zealand	1 – 2	Germany

== Classification round ==
- Saturday July 23, 2005 — 13th/16th place

Venezuela	8 – 7	China
Uzbekistan	1 – 11	Brazil

- Monday July 25, 2005 — 9th/12th place

Spain	3 – 4	Netherlands
Cuba	5 – 4	New Zealand

- Wednesday July 27, 2005 — 5th/8th place

Greece	9 – 4	Germany
Italy	9 – 10	Australia

== Quarter finals ==
- Monday July 25, 2005

Hungary	10 – 4	Germany
Russia	7 – 5	Italy
Canada	8 – 6	Greece
Australia	5 – 8	United States

== Semi finals ==
- Wednesday July 27, 2005

Russia	8 – 10	United States
Canada	7 – 9	Hungary

== Finals ==
- Monday July 25, 2005 — 15th place

China	4 – 5	Uzbekistan

- Monday July 25, 2005 — 13th place

Venezuela	2 – 11	Brazil

- Wednesday July 27, 2005 — 11th place

Spain	12 – 3	New Zealand

- Wednesday July 27, 2005 — 9th place

Netherlands	10 – 11	Cuba

- Friday July 29, 2005 — 7th place

Germany	8 – 12	Italy

- Friday July 29, 2005 — 5th place

Greece	10 – 8	Australia

- Friday July 29, 2005 — Bronze-medal match

Canada	8 – 3	Russia

- Friday July 29, 2005 — Gold-medal match

Hungary	10 – 7	United States

== Final ranking ==
Rank	Team
	Hungary
	United States
	Canada
4.	Russia
5.	Greece
6.	Australia
7.	Italy
8.	Germany
9.	Cuba
10.	Netherlands
11.	Spain
12.	New Zealand
13.	Brazil
14.	Venezuela
15.	Uzbekistan
16.	China

2005 FINA Women's World champions

Hungary
Second title

== Medalists ==
Gold	Silver	Bronze
Hungary Patricia Horvath; Eszter Tomaskovics; Khrisctina Serfozo; Dora Kisteleki; Mercedes Stieber; Andrea Toth; Rita Dravucz; Krisztina Zantleitner; Orsolya Takacs; Aniko Pelle; Agnes Valkai; Fruzsina Bravik; Timea Benko Head coach Tamás Faragó	United States Emily Feher; Heather Petri; Ericka Lorenz; Brenda Villa; Lauren Wenger; Natalie Golda; Kristina Kunkel; Erika Figge; Jaime Hipp; Kelly Rulon; Moriah van Norman; Drue Wawrzynski; Thalia Munro Head coach Heather Moody	Canada Rachel Riddell; Krystina Alogbo; Whynter Lamarre; Susan Gardiner; Tara Campbell; Marie Luc Arpin; Cora Campbell; Dominique Perreault; Ann Dow; Jana Salat; Valérie Dionne; Christine Robinson; Johanne Bégin Head coach Patrick Oaten

== Individual awards ==
- Most Valuable Player

- Ann Dow (CAN)

- Best Goalkeeper

- Patricia Horvath (HUN)

- Topscorer

- Tania di Mario (ITA) — 18 goals
