= Mariana Duarte =

Brazilian water polo player

Personal information
- Born: 5 October 1996 (age 29) Brazil
- Height: 169 cm (5 ft 7 in)
- Weight: 68 kg (150 lb)

Sport
- Sport: water polo
Medal record
Representing Brazil
Pan American Games
Bronze medal – third place	2019 Lima	Team
- Updated on 19 August 2015

Mariana Duarte (born 5 October 1996) is a Brazilian female water polo player.

She was part of the Brazilian team at the 2015 World Aquatics Championships. She participated at the 2016 Summer Olympics.

== See also ==
- Brazil at the 2015 World Aquatics Championships
- Brazil at the 2019 Panamerican Games
