= Jana Salat =

Canadian water polo player (born 1979)

Personal information
- Born: April 6, 1979 (age 47) Košice, Czechoslovakia

Sport
- Sport: Water polo
Medal record
Representing Canada
World Championships
Bronze medal – third place	2001 Fukuoka	Team
Bronze medal – third place	2005 Montréal	Team
Pan American Games
Silver medal – second place	2003 Santo Domingo	Team

Jana Salat (born April 6, 1979) is a Canadian water polo player, who was born in Slovakia. She was part of the 5th place women's water polo team at the 2000 Summer Olympics and a member of the bronze medal winning Canada women's national water polo team at the 2001 World Championships in Fukuoka, Japan.

== See also ==
- Canada women's Olympic water polo team records and statistics
- List of World Aquatics Championships medalists in water polo
