= Sandra Lizé =

Canadian water polo player (born 1977)

Personal information
- Born: July 8, 1977 (age 48) Quebec City, Quebec, Canada
Medal record
Women's water polo
Representing Canada
Pan American Games
| Silver medal – second place | 2007 Rio de Janeiro | Team |
Commonwealth Championships
| Silver medal – second place | 2006 Perth | Team |

Sandra Lizé (born July 8, 1977) is a Canadian female water polo player. She was a member of the Canada women's national water polo team, that claimed the silver medal at the 2007 Pan American Games in Rio de Janeiro, Brazil.

Born in Quebec City, Quebec, Lizé was a member of the 2000 Summer Olympics squad. Lizé resides in Montreal, Quebec.

== See also ==
- List of World Aquatics Championships medalists in water polo
