= Isabelle Auger =

Canadian water polo player (born 1969)

Personal information
- Born: 26 August 1969 (age 56) Saint-Hyacinthe, Quebec, Canada

Sport
- Sport: Water polo
Medal record
Representing Canada
World Championships
Silver medal – second place	1991 Perth	Team competition

Isabelle Auger (born 26 August 1969) is a Canadian water polo player. She competed in the women's tournament at the 2000 Summer Olympics.

== See also ==
- Canada women's Olympic water polo team records and statistics
- List of women's Olympic water polo tournament goalkeepers
- List of World Aquatics Championships medalists in water polo
