= Valérie Dionne =

Canadian water polo player (born 1980)

Personal information
- Born: July 29, 1980 (age 45) Sainte-Foy, Quebec, Canada

Sport
- Sport: Water polo
Medal record
Representing Canada
World Championships
Bronze medal – third place	2001 Fukuoka	Team competition
Bronze medal – third place	2005 Montréal	Team competition
Pan American Games
Silver medal – second place	2003 Santo Domingo	Team competition

Valérie Dionne (born July 29, 1980) is a Canadian water polo player. She is a member of the national women's water polo team and has competed in five juvenile, 15 provincial, and 11 national championships.

In 1999, the FINA Cup team on which she played qualified for the 2000 Summer Olympics, where the team placed fifth in the final results. She was also part of the bronze medal-winning women's water polo team at the 2001 world championships in Fukuoka, Japan.

== See also ==
- Canada women's Olympic water polo team records and statistics
- List of World Aquatics Championships medalists in water polo
