= Ann Dow =

Canadian water polo player (born 1971)

Personal information
- Born: May 1, 1971 (age 55) Montreal, Quebec, Canada

Sport
- Sport: Water polo
Medal record
Representing Canada
World Championships
Bronze medal – third place	2001 Fukuoka	Team competition
Bronze medal – third place	2005 Montréal	Team competition
Pan American Games
Silver medal – second place	2003 Santo Domingo	Team competition

Ann Dow (born May 1, 1971) is a Canadian water polo player. She was part of the fifth place women's water polo team at the 2000 Summer Olympics and was part of the bronze medal-winning women's water polo team at the 2001 World Championships in Fukuoka, Japan.

At club level, she played for Greek powerhouse Olympiacos in 2001–2002 season.

Dow was born in Montreal, Quebec. She is a graduate of the Université du Québec à Montréal.

== See also ==
- Canada women's Olympic water polo team records and statistics
- List of World Aquatics Championships medalists in water polo
