= Kristina Kunkel =

American water polo player (born 1984)

Personal information
- Full name: Kristina Marie Kunkel
- Born: March 27, 1984 (age 42) Rancho Santa Margarita, California
- Height: 5 ft 11 in (180 cm)

Sport
- Sport: Water Polo, Swimming
- Position: Utility (WP)
- College team: U. California Los Angeles (UCLA)
- Coached by: Adam Krikorian (UCLA)
Medal record
Women's water polo
Representing the United States
World Championship
Silver medal – second place	2005 Montréal	Team competition

Kristina Marie Kunkel (born March 27, 1984) is a water polo player from the United States. She was a member of the US Women's Water Polo Team that won the silver medal at the 2005 World Aquatics Championships in Montréal, Canada.

== Early life ==
Kristina Kunkel was born March 27, 1984 in Rancho Santa Margarita, California to George and Candis Keefe. She was one of three sisters, with siblings Kacy and Katie. Kunkel attended Santa Margarita Catholic High School where she earned letters in water polo in three years under Coach Scott Taylor. She earned varsity letters in two years for swimming under coaches Ronald and Richard Blanc. She was twice a Most Valuable Player for her High School league, twice an All-County First team honoree, and both an All American First Team and Academic All-American honoree.

In 2000, while a Junior at Santa Margarita, she was part of the US Youth team that attended the NorAm tournament in Montreal in late December.

== 2005 FINA World Championship silver medal ==
On July 29, 2005, she played on the US National water polo team that placed second, winning the silver medal, in Montreal, Canada, at the 11th FINA World Championships winning their silver medal match with a score of 10-7.

=== University of California Los Angeles ===
Kunkel attended the University of California Los Angeles from around 2003-2007, where she played water polo for Coach Adam Krikorian. During her tenure at UCLA, the women's water polo team won the NCAA championship in 2003, 2005, 2006, and 2007. In 2005, the women's water polo team went undefeated with a record of 33-0, and Kunkel had 24 season goals, steals of 24, and around 13 assists. While at UCLA, Kristina played the Utility position in water polo, which gave her coach the option of placing her in all the water polo position with the exclusion of goal tender.

== See also ==
- List of World Aquatics Championships medalists in water polo
