= Marianne Illing =

Canadian water polo player (born 1974)

Personal information
- Born: December 2, 1974 (age 51) Ottawa, Ontario, Canada
Medal record
Women's water polo
Representing Canada
Pan American Games
Silver medal – second place	2003 Santo Domingo	Team

Marianne Illing (born December 2, 1974) is a Canadian water polo player.

Illing is a graduate of Carleton University. She was a member of the Canadian women's Olympic water polo team in Athens, 2004. She was part of the 4th place women's water polo team at the 2003 World Championships in Barcelona, Spain.
