= Susan Gardiner =

Canadian water polo player (born 1980)

Personal information
- Born: April 13, 1980 (age 46) North Vancouver, British Columbia, Canada

Sport
- Sport: Water polo
Medal record
Representing Canada
World Championships
Bronze medal – third place	2001 Fukuoka	Team
Bronze medal – third place	2005 Montréal	Team
Pan American Games
Silver medal – second place	2003 Santo Domingo	Team

Susan Gardiner (born April 13, 1980) is a Canadian water polo player.

Gardiner is a former student at the University of British Columbia. She was a member of the Canadian team at the 2000 Summer Olympics, the 2004 Summer Olympics, and the bronze medal-winning team at 2001 World Aquatics Championships in Fukuoka, Japan.

Gardiner is an alumnus and past coach of the Vancouver-based Pacific Storm Water Polo Club.

== See also ==
- Canada women's Olympic water polo team records and statistics
- List of World Aquatics Championships medalists in water polo
