= Marie Luc Arpin =

Canadian water polo player (born 1978)

Personal information
- Born: July 4, 1978 (age 47) Saint-Hyacinthe, Quebec, Canada

Sport
- Sport: Water polo
Medal record
Representing Canada
World Championships
Bronze medal – third place	2001 Fukuoka	Team competition
Bronze medal – third place	2005 Montréal	Team competition
Pan American Games
Silver medal – second place	2003 Santo Domingo	Team competition

Marie Luc Arpin (born July 4, 1978) is a Canadian water polo player. She was born in Saint-Hyacinthe, Quebec and her home town is Saint-Lambert. and played water polo in Saint-Lambert from 1989 until 2005. She is a graduate of McGill University. She was part of the 5th place women's water polo team at the 2000 Summer Olympics, the 7th place women's water polo team at the 2004 Summer Olympics and the bronze medal winning women's water polo team at the 2001 world championships in Fukuoka, Japan.

== See also ==
- Canada women's Olympic water polo team records and statistics
- List of World Aquatics Championships medalists in water polo
