= Cora Campbell =

Canadian water polo player (born 1974)

Personal information
- Born: May 28, 1974 (age 52) Montreal, Quebec, Canada

Sport
- Sport: Water polo
Medal record
Representing Canada
World Championships
Bronze medal – third place	2001 Fukuoka	Team competition
Bronze medal – third place	2005 Montréal	Team competition
Pan American Games
Silver medal – second place	2003 Santo Domingo	Team competition
Silver medal – second place	2007 Rio de Janeiro	Team competition

Cora Campbell (born May 28, 1974) is a Canadian water polo player. She is a graduate of the University of Calgary. She was part of the 5th place women's water polo team at the 2000 Summer Olympics and was part of the bronze medal winning women's water polo team at the 2001 world championships in Fukuoka, Japan. She was a member of the 7th place Canadian women's water polo team at the 2004 Summer Olympics. She graduated from Riverdale High School. Her coach Pat Oaten is also a coach at the Dollard-des-Ormeaux Civic Center.

== See also ==
- Canada women's Olympic water polo team records and statistics
- List of World Aquatics Championships medalists in water polo
