= Josée Marsolais =

Canadian water polo player (born 1973)

Personal information
- Born: 20 December 1973 (age 52) Laval, Quebec, Canada

Sport
- Sport: Water polo
Medal record
Representing Canada
World Championships
Bronze medal – third place	2001 Fukuoka	Team competition

Josée Marsolais (born 20 December 1973) is a Canadian water polo player. She competed in the women's tournament at the 2000 Summer Olympics.

== See also ==
- Canada women's Olympic water polo team records and statistics
- List of women's Olympic water polo tournament goalkeepers
- List of World Aquatics Championships medalists in water polo
