= Marina Radu =

Canadian water polo player (born 1984)

Personal information
- Born: September 5, 1984 (age 42) Montreal, Quebec
- Height: 180 cm (5 ft 11 in)
- Weight: 65 kg (143 lb)

Sport
- Sport: Water polo
Medal record
Women's water polo
Representing Canada
World Championships
Silver medal – second place	2009 Rome	Team
Pan American Games
Silver medal – second place	2007 Rio de Janeiro	Team
Silver medal – second place	2011 Guadalajara	Team
Commonwealth Championships
Silver medal – second place	2006 Perth	Team

Marina Radu (born September 5, 1984 in Montreal, Quebec) is a water polo player from Canada. She was a member of the Canada women's national water polo team which claimed the silver medal at the 2007 Pan American Games in Rio de Janeiro, Brazil.

== See also ==
- List of World Aquatics Championships medalists in water polo
