= Katrina Monton =

Canadian water polo player (born 1987)

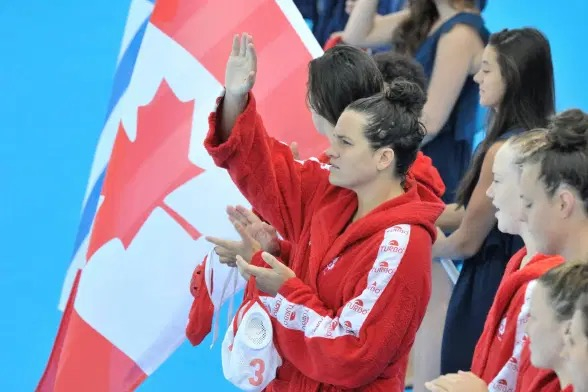
- FINA Aquatic World Championships, Barcelona, 2013

Personal information
- Born: Montreal, Quebec

Sport
- Country: Canada
- Sport: Water polo
Medal record
Women's water polo
Representing Canada
World Championships
Silver medal – second place	2009 Rome	Team
World League Superfinal
Silver medal – second place	2009 Russia	Team
Pan American Games
Silver medal – second place	2011 Guadalajara	Team
Silver medal – second place	2015 Toronto	Team
Junior Pan American Games
Silver medal – second place	2004 El Salvador	Team
Silver medal – second place	2006 Canada	Team
Commonwealth Games
Silver medal – second place	2006 Australia	Team
- Updated on 19 August 2015

Katrina Monton is a organizational psychologist, academic, and former international water polo player. She is an Assistant Teaching Professor in the Organizational Psychology program at Rutgers University and serves as Director of Experiential Learning. Her research focuses on organizational culture, leadership, sustainable high performance, gender and masculinity contest cultures, and the dynamics of high-performance systems.

Before entering academia, Monton represented Canada in water polo for more than a decade. She competed at five World Aquatics Championships and two Pan American Games and helped Canada reach the podium at six major international competitions, including winning silver at the 2009 World Aquatics Championships.

== Early life and education ==
Monton grew up in Dorval, Quebec, Canada. She began playing water polo at age 13 after previously competing as a swimmer.

She earned a bachelor's degree in sociology and psychology from Concordia University, graduating with distinction. In 2011, she attended the University of California, Berkeley on a full athletic scholarship and competed for the California Golden Bears women's water polo team.

Following her retirement from international sport, Monton earned an MA in Counselling Psychology from McGill University. She subsequently earned an MA in Social-Organizational Psychology from Teachers College, Columbia University and a PhD in Social-Organizational Psychology from Columbia University. Her doctoral research examined masculinity contest culture in medicine and its relationship with physician and organizational outcomes.

== Water Polo Career ==
Monton represented Canada internationally from 2004 to 2016, first as a member of the Canadian junior national team and later with the senior women's national team. She served as captain of the junior national team from 2005 to 2007.

As a center forward with Canada's senior national team, Monton competed at five World Aquatics Championships: Melbourne in 2007, Rome in 2009, Shanghai in 2011, Barcelona in 2013, and Kazan in 2015.

At the 2009 World Aquatics Championships in Rome, Monton helped Canada win the silver medal. Canada also won silver at the 2009 FINA World League Super Final and at the 2011 and 2015 Pan American Games.

Monton competed collegiately for the University of California, Berkeley in 2011. The Golden Bears reached the NCAA Division I championship game and finished as national runners-up, then the highest NCAA championship finish in the history of the women's water polo program.

During her career, Monton won eleven Canadian national championships, including nine consecutive championships between 2004 and 2013.

== Academic & Professional Career ==
After retiring from elite sport, Monton worked as a clinical counsellor before pursuing a career in organizational psychology.

In 2026, she joined the Graduate School of Applied and Professional Psychology at Rutgers University as an Assistant Teaching Professor of Organizational Psychology and Director of Experiential Learning. Her teaching and applied work emphasize experiential learning, organizational culture, group dynamics, leadership, and organizational change.

Monton's research examines the relationship between organizational culture, high performance, and well-being, particularly in high-stakes environments. Her work has examined elite sport, medicine, and other performance-oriented organizations, with particular attention to masculinity contest cultures, gender and power, systems psychodynamics, and the organizational conditions that can normalize harm.

Her research on high-performance cultures has appeared in journals including the Journal of Applied Behavioral Science, Career Development International, Annals of Surgery, and Frontiers . Her work has examined masculinity contest culture in elite sport, organizational culture in surgical training, athlete well-being, and approaches to creating high-performance environments that support both people and performance.

Monton has presented and spoken about organizational culture and athlete well-being internationally. Her work has been presented to the U.S. Department of Justice's Office on Violence Against Women and at the Sporting Chance Forum hosted by the United Nations and the Centre for Sport and Human Rights in Geneva.

She has also served in advisory roles related to athlete safety and sport reform, including with the U.S. Center for SafeSport and the Global Observatory for Gender Equality & Sport.

== Public Scholarship ==
Monton writes and speaks for public audiences about organizational psychology, leadership, sport, and high-performance cultures. She is a contributing writer for Psychology Today, where she writes the recurring column Humanizing High Performance.

She has provided expert commentary on organizational psychology to The New York Times. Her writing has also appeared in The Globe and Mail and the Montreal Gazette, including commentary on Olympic sport, organizational culture, and high-performance environments.

== Awards & Honors ==
Monton received the Sovereign's Medal for Volunteers from the Governor General of Canada in 2019 in recognition of her community service.

In 2022, she was named a Top 30 global finalist for a Pierre Elliott Trudeau Foundation doctoral scholarship. In 2023, Concordia University awarded her the John F. Lemieux Young Alumni Medal.

In 2026, Monton received the Loren Frankel Student Research Award from the Society for the Psychological Study of Men and Masculinities, Division 51 of the American Psychological Association, for her doctoral research.

== Selected Publications ==
- Monton, K., Gulati, T., & Hernandez Leiva, E. A. (2026). “Rethinking Elite Sport as High-Stakes Work: An Organizational Perspective on Well-Being and Sustainable Performance.” Frontiers in Sports and Active Living.
- Monton, K., Muhlstein, H., & Noumair, D. (2026). “Undoing Masculinity Contest Culture: Lessons from Practice.” Journal of Applied Behavioral Science.
- Monton, K., & Noumair, D. (2026). “Beneath the Surface: What Sport Reveals about High-Performance Systems.” Journal of Applied Behavioral Science.
- Monton, K., Venier, N., & Brazaitis, S. (2026). “Organizational Practices that Champion People and Performance: A Case Study of Speed Skating Canada.” Frontiers in Organizational Psychology.
- Monton, K., & Block, C. (2026). “No Pain, No Gain? Masculinity Contest Culture in Elite Sport Contexts.” Career Development International.
- Monton, K., Monton, O., Ervin, A. M., Frank, A. L., Seal, S. M., Block, C. J., & Johnston, F. M. (2025). “An Exploration of Culture in General Surgery Training Programs: A Scoping Review.” Annals of Surgery.

== Selected Athletic Achievements ==
- World Aquatics Championships: silver medal, 2009
- Pan American Games: silver medal, 2011 and 2015
- FINA World League Super Final: silver medal, 2009
- NCAA Division I Championship: runner-up, University of California, Berkeley, 2011
- Commonwealth Water Polo Championships: silver medal, 2006
- Canadian national championships: eleven career championships, including nine consecutive titles
