= Johanne Bégin =

Canadian water polo player (born 1971)

Personal information
- Born: October 21, 1971 (age 54) Vanier, Quebec, Canada

Sport
- Sport: Water polo
Medal record
Representing Canada
World Championships
Bronze medal – third place	2001 Fukuoka	Team competition
Bronze medal – third place	2005 Montréal	Team competition
Pan American Games
Silver medal – second place	2003 Santo Domingo	Team competition

Johanne Bégin (born October 21, 1971) is a Canadian water polo player.

Bégin was a member of the fifth-placed women's water polo team at the 2000 Summer Olympics, and of the bronze medal-winning team at the 2001 world championships in Fukuoka, Japan.

== See also ==
- Canada women's Olympic water polo team records and statistics
- List of World Aquatics Championships medalists in water polo
