= Tara Campbell =

Canadian water polo player (born 1983)

Personal information
- Born: July 21, 1983 (age 42) Montreal, Quebec
Medal record
Women's water polo
Representing Canada
World Championships
| Bronze medal – third place | 2005 Montréal | Team |
| Silver medal – second place | 2009 Rome | Team |
Pan American Games
| Silver medal – second place | 2007 Rio de Janeiro | Team |
| Silver medal – second place | 2011 Guadalajara | Team |

Tara Campbell (born July 21, 1983) is a Canadian water polo player. She is a member of the Women's National Team that claimed the bronze medal at the 2005 World Aquatics Championships in Montreal, Quebec, and the silver medal at the 2009 World Aquatics Championships in Rome, Italy. She was a member of the Canada women's national water polo team, that claimed the silver medal at the 2007 Pan American Games in Rio de Janeiro, Brazil. Tara was also a member of the Canadian Junior National team that won the gold medal at 2003 World Junior Championships in Calgary, Alberta, Canada.

Campbell studied at California State University, Long Beach. There she graduated in 2006 with a Bachelor of Business Administration degree, with a major in Finance.

== See also ==
- List of World Aquatics Championships medalists in water polo
