= Emily Csikos =

Canadian water polo player (born 1988)

Personal information
- Born: July 29, 1988 (age 37) Calgary, Alberta, Canada
Medal record
Women's water polo
Representing Canada
World Championships
Silver medal – second place	2009 Rome	Team
Pan American Games
Silver medal – second place	2007 Rio de Janeiro	Team
Silver medal – second place	2011 Guadalajara	Team

Emily Jean Csikos (born July 29, 1988, in Calgary, Alberta) is a female water polo player from Canada. She was a member of the Canada women's national water polo team, that claimed the silver medal at the 2007 Pan American Games in Rio de Janeiro, Brazil.

She recently graduated from the University of California at Berkeley majoring in Interdisciplinary Field Studies as well as playing on women's water polo team. She currently holds the record for all-time highest goals, along with earning All American honorable mention in 2009 and 1st team All American in 2010,11 and 2013.

== See also ==
- List of World Aquatics Championships medalists in water polo
