= Puerto Rico women's national water polo team =

Puerto Rico
- FINA code: PUR
- Confederation: UANA (Americas)

World Championship
- Appearances: 1 (first in 2007)
- Best result: 16th place (2007)

The Puerto Rico women's national water polo team is the representative for Puerto Rico in international women's water polo.

== History ==
=== Recent History ===
Puerto Rico qualified for the 2019 Pan American Games on the back of a second place finish at the 2018 Central American and Caribbean Games which was held in Barranquilla, Colombia. After losing their opening game of the tournament against the United States, they recorded a win over Venezuela 9-5.

== Results ==
=== World Championship ===
- 2007 — 16th place

=== Pan American Games ===
- 1999 — 5th place
- 2003 — 5th place
- 2007 — 5th place
- 2011 — 5th place
- 2015 — 5th place
- 2019 — 5th place
