= Whynter Lamarre =

Canadian water polo player (born 1979)

Personal information
- Born: January 14, 1979 (age 47) Lachine, Quebec, Canada

Sport
- Sport: Water polo
Medal record
Representing Canada
World Championships
Bronze medal – third place	2001 Fukuoka	Team competition
Bronze medal – third place	2005 Montréal	Team competition
Pan American Games
Silver medal – second place	2007 Rio de Janeiro	Team competition

Whynter Lamarre (born January 14, 1979) is a retired Canadian water polo goaltender. She began playing water polo at age 14, and graduated from McGill University. She was part of the bronze medal winning women's water polo team at the 2001 World Championships in Fukuoka, Japan.

== See also ==
- Canada women's Olympic water polo team records and statistics
- List of women's Olympic water polo tournament goalkeepers
- List of World Aquatics Championships medalists in water polo
