= Rachel Riddell =

Canadian water polo player (born 1984)

Personal information
- Born: September 5, 1984 (age 42) Winnipeg, Manitoba, Canada

Sport
- Sport: Water polo
Medal record
Representing Canada
World Championships
Silver medal – second place	2009 Rome	Team competition
Bronze medal – third place	2005 Montréal	Team competition
Pan American Games
Silver medal – second place	2003 Santo Domingo	Team competition
Silver medal – second place	2007 Rio de Janeiro	Team competition
Silver medal – second place	2011 Guadalajara	Team competition

Rachel Riddell (born September 5, 1984) is a Canadian water polo goaltender. She participated at the 2004 Summer Olympics.

== Life ==
Riddell was a student at Loyola Marymount University, and Concordia University.

She was part of the 4th place women's water polo team at the 2003 world championships in Barcelona, Spain. She was awarded best goalkeeper at the 2003 World Junior Championships in Calgary, Alberta, Canada, when the Canadian team won the gold medal.

Since 2003 Rachel Riddell has been a member of Canada's senior women's water polo team. At the 2005 Fina aquatic games, in Montreal, Canada, she won acclaim for her play in the bronze medal-winning game for Canada. In 2006, she helped Canada win silver at the Commonwealth games in Melbourne, Australia.

Riddell was awarded best goalkeeper of the 2009 World Championships in Rome, Italy, when Canada won the silver medal.

== See also ==
- Canada women's Olympic water polo team records and statistics
- List of women's Olympic water polo tournament goalkeepers
- List of World Aquatics Championships medalists in water polo
