= Monika Eggens =

Canadian water polo player (born 1990)

Personal information
- Full name: Monika Catharina Eggens
- Born: December 25, 1990 (age 35) Maple Ridge, British Columbia, Canada
- Height: 188 cm (6 ft 2 in)
- Weight: 77 kg (170 lb)

Sport
- Country: Canada
- Sport: Water polo
- Club: Olympiacos Piraeus
Medal record
Women's water polo
Representing Canada
Pan American Games
Silver medal – second place	2019 Lima	Team
Silver medal – second place	2015 Toronto	Team
Silver medal – second place	2011 Guadalajara	Team

Monika Catharina Eggens (born December 25, 1990) is a Canadian water polo player. She is a former student at the University of Hawaii. She currently plays for Olympiacos Piraeus and the Canada women's national water polo team.

In June 2021, Eggens was named to Canada's 2020 Summer Olympics team.
