= Joëlle Békhazi =

Canadian water polo player (born 1987)

Personal information
- Born: Joëlle Stephanie Békhazi; April 27, 1987 (age 39) Hamilton, Ontario
- Height: 1.70 m (5 ft 7 in)
- Weight: 66 kg (146 lb)

Sport
- Country: Canada
- Sport: Water polo
- Club: DDO Water Polo Club
Medal record
Women's water polo
Representing Canada
World Championships
Silver medal – second place	2009 Rome	Team
Pan American Games
Silver medal – second place	2007 Rio de Janeiro	Team
Silver medal – second place	2011 Guadalajara	Team
Silver medal – second place	2015 Toronto	Team
Silver medal – second place	2019 Lima	Team

Joëlle Stephanie Békhazi (born April 27, 1987) is a female water polo player from Canada. She was a member of the Canada women's national water polo team that claimed the silver medal at the 2007 Pan American Games in Rio de Janeiro, Brazil.

In June 2021, Bekhazi was named to Canada's 2020 Summer Olympics team.

== See also ==
- List of World Aquatics Championships medalists in water polo
