= Marie-Claude Deslières =

Canadian water polo player (born 1966)

Personal information
- Born: 1 April 1966 (age 60) Montreal, Quebec, Canada

Sport
- Sport: Water polo
Medal record
Representing Canada
World Championships
Silver medal – second place	1991 Perth	Team competition

Marie-Claude Deslières (born 1 April 1966) is a Canadian water polo player. She competed in the women's tournament at the 2000 Summer Olympics.

== See also ==
- List of World Aquatics Championships medalists in water polo
