= Dominique Perreault =

Canadian water polo player (born 1984)

Personal information
- Born: October 26, 1984 (age 41) Montreal, Quebec
- Height: 1.78 m (5 ft 10 in)
- Weight: 61 kg (134 lb)

Sport
- Country: Canada
- Sport: Water polo
- Club: CAMO
Medal record
Women's water polo
Representing Canada
World Championships
Silver medal – second place	2009 Rome	Team
Bronze medal – third place	2005 Montréal	Team
Pan American Games
Silver medal – second place	2007 Rio de Janeiro	Team
Silver medal – second place	2011 Guadalajara	Team
Silver medal – second place	2015 Toronto	Team

Dominique Perreault (born October 26, 1984) is a Canadian water polo player. She is a member of the Canada women's national water polo team that claimed the bronze medal at the 2005 World Aquatics Championships.

== See also ==
- List of World Aquatics Championships medalists in water polo
