= Christine Robinson =

Canadian water polo player (born 1984)

Personal information
- Born: May 17, 1984 (age 42) Pointe-Claire, Quebec
- Height: 1.80 m (5 ft 11 in)
- Weight: 80 kg (176 lb)

Sport
- Country: Canada
- Sport: Water polo
- Club: DDO Water Polo Club
Medal record
Women's water polo
Representing Canada
World Championships
Silver medal – second place	2009 Rome	Team
Bronze medal – third place	2005 Montreal	Team
Pan American Games
Silver medal – second place	2007 Rio de Janeiro	Team
Silver medal – second place	2011 Guadalajara	Team
Silver medal – second place	2015 Toronto	Team

Christine Robinson (born May 17, 1984) is a Canadian water polo player. She is a student at McGill University. She was part of the 7th place women's water polo team at the 2004 Summer Olympics. She won a gold medal at the 2003 FINA Junior Water Polo World Championships in Calgary.

== See also ==
- List of World Aquatics Championships medalists in water polo
