= Krystina Alogbo =

Canadian water polo player (born 1986)

Personal information
- Born: January 20, 1986 (age 40) Montreal, Quebec
- Height: 1.65 m (5 ft 5 in)
- Weight: 78 kg (172 lb)

Sport
- Country: Canada
- Sport: Water polo
- Club: CAMO
Medal record
Women's water polo
Representing Canada
World Championships
Silver medal – second place	2009 Rome	Team
Bronze medal – third place	2005 Montreal	Team
Pan American Games
Silver medal – second place	2007 Rio de Janeiro	Team
Silver medal – second place	2011 Guadalajara	Team
Silver medal – second place	2015 Toronto	Team
Silver medal – second place	2019 Lima	Team

Krystina Alogbo (born January 20, 1986) is a Canadian water polo player. She was a member of the Women's Nation Team, which claimed the bronze medal at the 2005 World Aquatics Championships in Montreal, Quebec.

== See also ==
- List of World Aquatics Championships medalists in water polo
