= Patrick Oaten =

Canadian water polo player and coach

Sport
- Sport: Water polo

Patrick Oaten is a Canadian water polo coach. He was the head coach of the Brazil women's national water polo team at the 2016 Summer Olympics.
