= Cuba women's national water polo team =

Cuba national team

Cuba
- FINA code: CUB
- Confederation: UANA (Americas)

FINA ranking (since 2008)
- Highest: 13 (2011)

World Championship
- Appearances: 1 (first in 2019)
- Best result: 15th place (2019)

The Cuba women's national water polo team represents Cuba in international women's water polo competitions.

== Results ==
=== World Championship ===
- 2005 — 9th place
- 2007 — 15th place
- 2011 — 10th place
- 2019 — 15th place

== See also ==
- Cuba men's national water polo team
