= Water polo at the 2003 Pan American Games =

The Water Polo Tournament at the 2003 Pan American Games had a men's and a women's competition. The women were competing for the second time at the Pan American Games. The event was held in Santo Domingo, Dominican Republic.

== Men's competition ==
=== Preliminary round ===
	Team	Points	G	W	D	L	GF	GA	Diff
1.	United States	14	7	7	0	0	115	19	+96
2.	Brazil	12	7	6	0	1	85	47	+38
3.	Canada	10	7	5	0	2	73	40	+33
4.	Puerto Rico	9	7	4	1	2	47	74	–27
5.	Mexico	6	7	2	2	3	36	58	–22
6.	Argentina	3	7	1	1	5	33	61	–28
7.	Colombia	3	7	1	1	5	44	72	–28
8.	Dominican Republic	1	7	0	1	6	35	95	–60

- August 2, 2003

Mexico	6 – 6	Colombia
Canada	11 – 2	Argentina
United States	24 – 0	Dominican Republic
Brazil	15 – 6	Puerto Rico

- August 3, 2003

Argentina	6 – 5	Colombia
United States	17 – 5	Brazil
Mexico	5 – 5	Puerto Rico
Canada	14 – 2	Dominican Republic

- August 4, 2003

Colombia	12 – 8	Dominican Republic
Brazil	9 – 8	Canada
Mexico	6 – 5	Argentina
United States	14 – 2	Puerto Rico

- August 5, 2003

Argentina	8 – 8	Dominican Republic
United States	18 – 1	Mexico
Brazil	16 – 5	Colombia
Canada	17 – 6	Puerto Rico

- August 6, 2003

Mexico	8 – 5	Dominican Republic
Brazil	11 – 4	Argentina
United States	11 – 5	Canada
Puerto Rico	10 – 9	Colombia

- August 7, 2003

Brazil	19 – 4	Dominican Republic
United States	18 – 4	Colombia
Argentina	6 – 7	Puerto Rico
Canada	10 – 6	Mexico

- August 8, 2003

United States	13 – 2	Argentina
Canada	8 – 3	Colombia
Dominican Republic	8 – 11	Puerto Rico
Brazil	9 – 4	Mexico

=== Semi Final Round ===
- August 9, 2003

Brazil	4 – 2	Canada
United States	16 – 7	Puerto Rico

Argentina	8 – 6	Colombia
Mexico	13 – 4	Dominican Republic

=== Final round ===
- August 10, 2003 — 7th place

Colombia	10 – 6	Dominican Republic

- August 10, 2003 — 5th place

Mexico	6 – 5	Argentina

- August 10, 2003 — Bronze-medal match

Canada	15 – 4	Puerto Rico

- August 10, 2003 — Gold-medal match

United States	13 – 7	Brazil

=== Final ranking ===
RANK	TEAM
	United States
	Brazil
	Canada
4.	Puerto Rico
5.	Mexico
6.	Argentina
7.	Colombia
8.	Dominican Republic

2003 Men's Pan American champions

United States
Tenth title

== Women's competition ==
=== Preliminary round ===
	Team	Points	G	W	D	L	GF	GA	Diff
1.	Canada	7	4	3	1	0	53	14	+39
2.	United States	7	4	3	1	0	49	13	+36
3.	Brazil	3	4	1	1	2	19	32	–13
4.	Cuba	3	4	1	1	2	16	41	–25
5.	Puerto Rico	0	4	0	0	4	10	47	–37

- August 3, 2003

Cuba	6 – 3	Puerto Rico
Canada	12 – 4	Brazil

- August 4, 2003

United States	20 – 2	Puerto Rico
Brazil	6 – 6	Cuba

- August 5, 2003

Canada	19 – 3	Cuba
United States	9 – 4	Brazil

- August 6, 2003

Canada	15 – 0	Puerto Rico
United States	13 – 1	Cuba

- August 7, 2003

Brazil	6 – 5	Puerto Rico
United States	7 – 7	Canada

=== Semi finals ===
- August 9, 2003

Canada	16 – 2	Cuba
United States	7 – 3	Brazil

=== Bronze Medal ===
- August 10, 2003

Brazil	6 – 5	Cuba

=== Gold Medal ===
- August 10, 2003

United States	7 – 3	Canada

=== Final ranking ===
RANK	TEAM
	United States
	Canada
	Brazil
4.	Cuba
5.	Puerto Rico

2003 Women's Pan American champions

United States
First title
