= Water polo at the 2007 Pan American Games =

The Water Polo Tournament at the 2007 Pan American Games was held in Rio de Janeiro, from July 13–29, 2007.

Both the men's and women's teams from the United States won gold.

== Men's competition ==
=== Group A ===
| | Team | Points | G | W | D | L | GF | GA | Diff |
|---|---|---|---|---|---|---|---|---|---|
| 1. | United States | 6 | 3 | 3 | 0 | 0 | 51 | 12 | +39 |
| 2. | Brazil | 4 | 3 | 2 | 0 | 1 | 35 | 24 | +11 |
| 3. | Mexico | 2 | 3 | 1 | 0 | 2 | 17 | 33 | -16 |
| 4. | Puerto Rico | 0 | 3 | 0 | 0 | 3 | 10 | 44 | -34 |

| July 21, 2007; 16:30 | Mexico | 6–3 | Puerto Rico |

| July 21, 2007; 19:30 | Brazil | 6–12 | United States |

| July 22, 2007; 16:30 | Mexico | 3–18 | United States |

| July 22, 2007; 19:30 | Brazil | 17–4 | Puerto Rico |

| July 23, 2007; 16:30 | United States | 21–3 | Puerto Rico |

| July 23, 2007; 19:30 | Brazil | 12–8 | Mexico |

=== Group B ===
| | Team | Points | G | W | D | L | GF | GA | Diff |
|---|---|---|---|---|---|---|---|---|---|
| 1. | Canada | 6 | 3 | 3 | 0 | 0 | 46 | 21 | +25 |
| 2. | Cuba | 4 | 3 | 2 | 0 | 1 | 40 | 27 | +13 |
| 3. | Colombia | 2 | 3 | 1 | 0 | 2 | 15 | 33 | -18 |
| 4. | Argentina | 0 | 3 | 0 | 0 | 3 | 21 | 41 | -20 |

| July 21, 2007; 15:00 | Canada | 15–12 | Cuba |

| July 21, 2007; 18:00 | Argentina | 7–8 | Colombia |

| July 22, 2007; 15:00 | Canada | 12–1 | Colombia |

| July 22, 2007; 18:00 | Argentina | 6–14 | Cuba |

| July 23, 2007; 15:00 | Cuba | 14–6 | Colombia |

| July 23, 2007; 16:30 | Canada | 19–8 | Argentina |

=== Semifinals ===
| July 25, 2007; 18:00 | United States | 15–4 | Cuba |

| July 25, 2007; 19:30 | Canada | 6–10 | Brazil |

=== Classification 5-8 ===
| July 25, 2007; 15:00 | Mexico | 8–9 | Argentina |

| July 25, 2007; 16:30 | Puerto Rico | 9–10 | Colombia |

=== Finals ===
==== Classification 7-8 ====
| July 26, 2007; 15:00 | Puerto Rico | 5–10 | Mexico |

==== Classification 5-6 ====
| July 26, 2007; 16:30 | Colombia | 10–7 | Argentina |

==== Bronze medal match ====
| July 26, 2007; 18:00 | Cuba | 5–9 | Canada |

==== Gold Medal match ====
| July 26, 2007; 19:30 | United States | 9–2 | Brazil |

=== Final classification ===
| RANK | TEAM |
|---|---|
| | United States |
| | Brazil |
| | Canada |
| 4. | Cuba |
| 5. | Colombia |
| 6. | Argentina |
| 7. | Mexico |
| 8. | Puerto Rico |

2007 Men's Pan American champions

United States
Tenth title

== Women's competition ==
=== Preliminary round ===
| | Team | Points | G | W | D | L | GF | GA | Diff |
|---|---|---|---|---|---|---|---|---|---|
| 1. | United States | 10 | 5 | 5 | 0 | 0 | 68 | 22 | +46 |
| 2. | Canada | 7 | 5 | 3 | 1 | 1 | 59 | 27 | +32 |
| 3. | Brazil | 6 | 5 | 3 | 0 | 2 | 42 | 30 | +12 |
| 4. | Cuba | 3 | 5 | 1 | 1 | 3 | 39 | 52 | -13 |
| 5. | Puerto Rico | 2 | 5 | 1 | 0 | 4 | 36 | 57 | -21 |
| 6. | Venezuela | 2 | 5 | 1 | 0 | 4 | 29 | 85 | -56 |

| July 14, 2007; 15:00 | Cuba | 13–12 | Puerto Rico |

| July 14, 2007; 16:30 | United States | 21–3 | Venezuela |

| July 14, 2007; 18:00 | Canada | 5–2 | Brazil |

| July 15, 2007; 15:00 | Puerto Rico | 5–14 | Canada |

| July 15, 2007; 16:30 | United States | 14–6 | Cuba |

| July 15, 2007; 18:00 | Venezuela | 4–20 | Brazil |

| July 16, 2007; 15:00 | Cuba | 8–9 | Venezuela |

| July 16, 2007; 16:30 | Canada | 8–10 | United States |

| July 16, 2007; 18:00 | Brazil | 7–6 | Puerto Rico |

| July 17, 2007; 15:00 | Venezuela | 10–11 | Puerto Rico |

| July 17, 2007; 16:30 | Cuba | 7–7 | Canada |

| July 17, 2007; 18:00 | United States | 10–3 | Brazil |

| July 18, 2007; 15:00 | United States | 13–2 | Puerto Rico |

| July 18, 2007; 16:30 | Canada | 25–3 | Venezuela |

| July 18, 2007; 18:00 | Brazil | 10–5 | Cuba |

=== Semifinals ===
| July 19, 2007; 16:30 | United States | 16–3 | Cuba |

| July 19, 2007; 18:00 | Canada | 6–5 | Brazil |

=== Finals ===
==== Classification 5-6 ====
| July 19, 2007; 15:00 | Puerto Rico | 13–7 | Venezuela |

==== Bronze medal match ====
| July 20, 2007; 16:30 | Cuba | 6–5 | Brazil |

==== Gold Medal match ====
| July 20, 2007; 18:00 | United States | 6–4 | Canada |

=== Final classification ===
| RANK | TEAM |
|---|---|
| | United States |
| | Canada |
| | Cuba |
| 4. | Brazil |
| 5. | Puerto Rico |
| 6. | Venezuela |

2007 Women's Pan American champions

United States
Second title
