= Water polo at the 2014 Central American and Caribbean Games =

- Venue: Leyes de Reforma Aquatics Centre
- Location: Veracruz, Mexico
- Dates: 22-29 November

Medalists
gold medal	Mexico - men's
gold medal	Venezuela - women's
silver medal	Venezuela
silver medal	Puerto Rico
bronze medal	Cuba
bronze medal	Cuba

The water polo Competitions at the 2014 Central American and Caribbean Games took place at the Leyes de Reforma Aquatics Centre in Veracruz, Mexico from November 22 to 29. There were two competitions, one each for men and women, seven national teams competed in the men's tournament, while five contested the women's event. The top 3 teams (affiliated to the Central American and Caribbean Swimming Federation) in each tournament qualifies to compete at the 2015 Pan American Games in Toronto, Canada.

== Medal summary ==
Event	Gold	Silver	Bronze
Men	Mexico (MEX); Orlando Ortega; Jorge Perez; Hermes Ponce; Andres Oneto; Antonio Avalos; Fausto Vazquez; Oliver Alvarez; Armando Gibert; Armando Garcia; Perseo Ponce; Maximiliano Aguilar; Israel Perez; Alfredo de la Mora	Venezuela (VEN); Carlos Linares; Joaquin Lopez; Jean Sanchez; Douglas Espinoza; Pedro Mujica; Carlos Fernandez; Angel Rojas; Hugo Velazquez; Antonio Pirela; Oliver Lopez; Moises Perez; Jimmy Ferraz; Adrian Torres	Cuba (CUB); Gianny Lara; Rudy Despaigne; Ernesto Cisneros; Edgar Lara; Rasiel Gullo; Giraldo Carales; Raydel Carales; Ivey Arroyo; Jose Peralta; Rigel Jimenez; Yohandri Andrade; Raydel Martinez; Emilio Oms
Women	Venezuela (VEN); Manuela Aquino; Ana Balsero; Dulce Hernandez; Marian Blanco; Genesis Perez; Soleilyn Martinez; Rocio Galue; Franyelis Escalona; Yineldy Araujo; Beatriz Escobar; Oriana Rolfo; Jeisnaimil Agelvis; Angela Calvo	Puerto Rico (PUR); Nichole Colon; Paola Medina; Osmarie Quinones; Amanda Ortiz; Angelik Velazquez; Nicole Schmidt; Nathalia Melendez; Alejandra Ortiz; Guarina Garcia; Claudia Ramos; Cristina Ortiz; Caroline Matos; Cristina Lugo	Cuba (CUB); Mairelis Zunzunegui; Dalia Grau; Yeliana Bravo; Thaimi Gonzalez; Danay Gutierrez; Mayelin Bernal; Adriana Garlobo; Maviel Mendiola; Cecilia Diaz; Yordanka Pujols; Lisbeth Santana; Gertrudis Ortiz; Arisney Ramos

== Medal table ==
Rank	Nation	Gold	Silver	Bronze	Total
1	Venezuela	1	1	0	2
2	Mexico	1	0	0	1
3	Puerto Rico	0	1	0	1
4	Cuba	0	0	2	2
Totals (4 entries)		2	2	2	6

== Men's tournament ==
=== Preliminary round ===
Pos	Team	Pld	W	D	L	GF	GA	GD	Pts	Final Result
1	Venezuela	6	5	0	1	58	36	+22	10	Final round
2	Mexico (H)	6	5	0	1	93	45	+48	10	Final round
3	Cuba	6	4	1	1	90	44	+46	9	Final round
4	Colombia	6	3	1	2	73	41	+32	7	Final round
5	Puerto Rico	6	2	0	4	58	61	−3	4	Play-offs
6	Trinidad and Tobago	6	1	0	5	51	81	−30	2	Play-offs
7	Guatemala	6	0	0	6	12	127	−115	0	

Source: Veracruz 2014
(H) Hosts

November 22, 2014; 14:30	Report	Venezuela	6–5	Colombia

November 22, 2014; 16:00	Report	Puerto Rico	16–9	Trinidad and Tobago

November 22, 2014; 17:30	Report	Guatemala	3–29	Mexico

November 23, 2014; 14:30	Report	Venezuela	10–8	Puerto Rico

November 23, 2014; 16:00	Report	Colombia	16–4	Trinidad and Tobago

November 23, 2014; 17:30	Report	Guatemala	0–29	Cuba

November 24, 2014; 14:30	Report	Venezuela	11–5	Trinidad and Tobago

November 24, 2014; 16:00	Report	Puerto Rico	8–13	Colombia

November 24, 2014; 17:30	Report	Cuba	11–15	Mexico

November 25, 2014; 14:30	Report	Venezuela	18–3	Guatemala

November 25, 2014; 16:00	Report	Colombia	11–12	Mexico

November 25, 2014; 17:30	Report	Puerto Rico	8–14	Cuba

November 26, 2014; 14:30	Report	Venezuela	6–5	Mexico

November 26, 2014; 16:00	Report	Colombia	18–1	Guatemala

November 26, 2014; 17:30	Report	Trinidad and Tobago	4–16	Cuba

November 27, 2014; 14:30	Report	Venezuela	7–10	Cuba

November 27, 2014; 16:00	Report	Puerto Rico	14–2	Guatemala

November 27, 2014; 17:30	Report	Trinidad and Tobago	10–19	Mexico

November 28, 2014; 14:30	Report	Colombia	10–10	Cuba

November 28, 2014; 16:00	Report	Trinidad and Tobago	19–3	Guatemala

November 28, 2014; 17:30	Report	Puerto Rico	4–13	Mexico

==== Fifth place match ====
November 29, 2014; 17:00	Report	Puerto Rico	13–12	Trinidad and Tobago

=== Final round ===
==== Bronze medal match ====
November 29, 2014; 19:00	Report	Cuba	12–10	Colombia

==== Gold medal match ====
November 29, 2014; 21:00	Report	Venezuela	6–7	Mexico

== Women's tournament ==
=== Preliminary round ===
Pos	Team	Pld	W	D	L	GF	GA	GD	Pts	Final Result
1	Venezuela	4	3	0	1	51	18	+33	6	Avances to Semifinals
2	Puerto Rico	4	3	0	1	50	24	+26	6	Avances to Semifinals
3	Mexico (H)	4	3	0	1	53	23	+30	6	Avances to Semifinals
4	Cuba	4	1	0	3	61	36	+25	2	Avances to Semifinals
5	Guatemala	4	0	0	4	4	118	−114	0	

Source: Veracruz 2014
(H) Hosts

November 22, 2014; 9:30	Report	Mexico	8–9	Puerto Rico

November 22, 2014; 11:00	Report	Guatemala	0–25	Venezuela

November 23, 2014; 9:30	Report	Cuba	39–1	Guatemala

November 23, 2014; 11:00	Report	Venezuela	7–8	Mexico

November 24, 2014; 9:30	Report	Mexico	9–7	Cuba

November 24, 2014; 11:00	Report	Puerto Rico	10–11	Venezuela

November 25, 2014; 9:30	Report	Guatemala	0–28	Mexico

November 25, 2014; 11:00	Report	Cuba	8–12	Puerto Rico

November 26, 2014; 9:30	Report	Puerto Rico	26–3	Guatemala

November 26, 2014; 11:00	Report	Cuba	7–14	Venezuela

=== Final round ===
==== Semifinals ====
November 28, 2014; 9:30	Report	Puerto Rico	8–7	Cuba

November 28, 2014; 11:00	Report	Mexico	4–5	Venezuela

==== Bronze medal match ====
November 29, 2014; 13:00	Report	Cuba	14–13	Mexico

==== Gold medal match ====
November 29, 2014; 15:00	Report	Puerto Rico	6–11	Venezuela
