= Water polo at the 2006 Central American and Caribbean Games =

- Venue: Complejo Acuatico U. D. Pedro de Heredia
- Location: Cartagena de Indias, Colombia
- Dates: 23-29 July

Medalists
| gold medal | Cuba - men's |
| gold medal | Cuba - women's |
| silver medal | Colombia |
| silver medal | Puerto Rico |
| bronze medal | Mexico |
| bronze medal | Venezuela |

At the 2006 Central American and Caribbean Games the game of water polo was played by men and women. They both competed at the Complejo Acuatico U. D. Pedro de Heredia in Cartagena de Indias, Colombia from July 23 to July 29, 2006. The women participated for the first time at the Central American and Caribbean Games.

== Medal summary ==
| Event | Gold | Silver | Bronze |
|---|---|---|---|
| Men's team | Cuba; Carlos Ortega; Edgar Lara; Emiio Orns; Ernesto Cisneros; Ernesto Diaz; Gianny Lara; Ives Gonzalez; Nieter Sanchez; Rigel Jimenez; Yarbul Gonzalez; Yohandri Andrades; Richard Cabrera; Jose Gonzalez | Colombia; Elkin Buitrago; Nelson Bejarano; Joaquin Ortiz; Jorge Soto; Jorge Montoya; Jairo Lizarazo; Alejandro Idarraga; Danilo Orozco; Andres Madrid; Juan Giraldo; Andres Hernandez; Juan Echeverry; Carlos Marin | Mexico; Ornar Montiel; Cutberto Hernandez; Hermes Ponce; Rainier Schmidt; Fausto Vazquez; Jorge Lopez; Oliver Alvarez; Richard Schmidt; Diego Castaneda; Romel Palacios; Maximiliano Aguilar Jr. Armando Garcia; Carlos Villegas |
| Women's team | Cuba; Sheila Gomez; Leyanis Gutierrez; Hirovis Hernandez; Dayana Morales; Danay Gutierrez; Olga Soler; Yanelis Andreus; Lisandra Frometa; Neldys Truffin; Mairelis Zunzunequi; Yamira Caballero; Helen Reyes | Puerto Rico; Estefania Laboy; Paola Medina; Angelica Ortiz; Amanda Ortiz; Carla Martinez; Carla Batiz; Angelica Garcia; Alejandra Ortiz; Mairim Rosado; Anaid Ralat; Cristina Ortiz; Nicoll Medina; Mirelis Arocho | Venezuela; Xomar Vilar; Yaurimar Gutierrez; Selene Rego; Yessenia Bastardo; Thais Suarez; Rocio Garue; Jesvia Alvarado; Carol Caliz; Fabiola Godoy; Gregory Aguilar; Andrea Victoria; Alejandra Florez |

== Men's competition ==
=== Preliminary round ===
| | Team | Points | G | W | D | L | GF | GA | Diff |
|---|---|---|---|---|---|---|---|---|---|
| 1. | Cuba | 10 | 5 | 5 | 0 | 0 | 101 | 34 | +67 |
| 2. | Venezuela | 6 | 5 | 3 | 0 | 2 | 39 | 46 | –7 |
| 3. | Colombia | 5 | 5 | 2 | 1 | 2 | 56 | 39 | +17 |
| 4. | Mexico | 5 | 5 | 2 | 1 | 2 | 60 | 49 | +11 |
| 5. | Puerto Rico | 4 | 5 | 2 | 0 | 3 | 57 | 53 | +3 |
| 6. | Trinidad and Tobago | 0 | 5 | 0 | 0 | 5 | 18 | 109 | –91 |

- July 23, 2006

| Venezuela | 9 – 8 | Puerto Rico |
| Trinidad and Tobago | 3 – 21 | Mexico |
| Cuba | 11 – 7 | Colombia |

- July 24, 2006

| Venezuela | 6 – 12 | Mexico |
| Cuba | 32 – 4 | Trinidad and Tobago |
| Puerto Rico | 8 – 12 | Colombia |

- July 25, 2006

| Mexico | 9 – 19 | Cuba |
| Puerto Rico | 22 – 3 | Trinidad and Tobago |
| Venezuela | 6 – 5 | Colombia |

- July 26, 2006

| Cuba | 18 – 7 | Venezuela |
| Puerto Rico | 12 – 9 | Mexico |
| Colombia | 23 – 5 | Trinidad and Tobago |

- July 27, 2006

| Trinidad and Tobago | 3 – 11 | Venezuela |
| Puerto Rico | 7 – 21 | Cuba |
| Mexico | 9 – 9 | Colombia |

=== Semi finals ===
- July 28, 2006

| Mexico | 5 – 9 | Cuba |
| Colombia | 13 – 6 | Venezuela |

=== Finals ===
- Fifth Place Match — July 28, 2006

| Trinidad and Tobago | 5 – 16 | Puerto Rico |

- Bronze Medal Match — July 29, 2006

| Venezuela | 7 – 11 | Mexico |

- Gold Medal Match — July 29, 2006

| Colombia | 7 – 12 | Cuba |

=== Final ranking ===
| RANK | TEAM |
|---|---|
| 1. | Cuba |
| 2. | Colombia |
| 3. | Mexico |
| 4. | Venezuela |
| 5. | Puerto Rico |
| 5. | Trinidad and Tobago |

=== Topscorers ===
| RANK | PLAYER'S NAME | GOALS |
|---|---|---|
| 1. | Rigel Jimenez (CUB) | 30 |
| 2. | Ernesto Cisnero (CUB) | 24 |
| 3. | Gilberto Rosa (PUR) | 16 |
| 4. | Christopher George (TRI) | 15 |
| 5. | Cutberto Hernandez (MEX) | 13 |
| 6. | Carlos Ortega Castillo (CUB) | 12 |
| 6. | Oliver Alvarez (MEX) | 12 |
| 6. | Iosse Gonzalez (CUB) | 12 |

== Women's competition ==
=== Preliminary round ===
| | Team | Points | G | W | D | L | GF | GA | Diff |
|---|---|---|---|---|---|---|---|---|---|
| 1. | Cuba | 8 | 4 | 4 | 0 | 0 | 63 | 20 | +43 |
| 2. | Puerto Rico | 6 | 4 | 3 | 0 | 1 | 43 | 33 | +10 |
| 3. | Venezuela | 4 | 4 | 2 | 0 | 2 | 36 | 42 | –6 |
| 4. | Mexico | 1 | 4 | 0 | 1 | 3 | 23 | 42 | –19 |
| 5. | Colombia | 1 | 4 | 0 | 1 | 3 | 21 | 49 | –28 |

- July 23, 2006

| Venezuela | 10 – 9 | Mexico |
| Cuba | 19 – 3 | Colombia |

- July 24, 2006

| Puerto Rico | 8 – 16 | Cuba |
| Venezuela | 12 – 8 | Colombia |

- July 25, 2006

| Venezuela | 9 – 10 | Puerto Rico |
| Mexico | 6 – 6 | Colombia |

- July 26, 2006

| Puerto Rico | 13 – 4 | Mexico |
| Cuba | 15 – 5 | Venezuela |

- July 27, 2006

| Mexico | 4 – 13 | Cuba |
| Puerto Rico | 12 – 4 | Colombia |

=== Semi finals ===
- July 28, 2006

| Cuba | 12 – 4 | Mexico |
| Puerto Rico | 10 – 8 | Venezuela |

=== Finals ===
- Bronze Medal Match — July 29, 2006

| Venezuela | 10 – 6 | Mexico |

- Gold Medal Match — July 29, 2006

| Puerto Rico | 7 – 15 | Cuba |

=== Final ranking ===
| RANK | TEAM |
|---|---|
| 1. | Cuba |
| 2. | Puerto Rico |
| 3. | Venezuela |
| 4. | Mexico |
| 5. | Colombia |

=== Topscorers ===
| RANK | PLAYER'S NAME | GOALS |
|---|---|---|
| 1. | Hirovis Hernandez (CUB) | 23 |
| 1. | Amanda Ortíz (PUR) | 23 |
| 3. | Danay Gutierrez (CUB) | 15 |
| 4. | Yamira Caballero (CUB) | 12 |
| 4. | Leyanis Gutierrez (CUB) | 12 |
| 4. | Angelica García (PUR) | 12 |
| 4. | Olga Soler (CUB) | 12 |
| 4. | Gregory Aguilar (VEN) | 12 |
| 9. | Jesvia Alvarado (VEN) | 11 |
| 10. | Paola Medina (PUR) | 10 |
