= Water polo at the 2018 Central American and Caribbean Games =

- Venue: Complejo Acuático
- Location: (Colombia) Barranquilla
- Dates: 26 July – 2 August
- Nations: 8
- Teams: 8 (men); 6 (women)

Champions
- Men: Colombia
- Women: Cuba

The water polo competition at the 2018 Central American and Caribbean Games was held in Barranquilla, Colombia from 26 July to 2 August at the Complejo Acuático.

== Medal summary ==
Event	Gold	Silver	Bronze
Men’s tournament	Colombia	Cuba	Puerto Rico
Women’s tournament	Cuba	Puerto Rico	Mexico

== Medal table ==
* Host nation (Colombia)

Rank	Nation	Gold	Silver	Bronze	Total
1	Cuba (CUB)	1	1	0	2
2	Colombia (COL)*	1	0	0	1
3	Puerto Rico (PUR)	0	1	1	2
4	Mexico (MEX)	0	0	1	1
Totals (4 entries)		2	2	2	6

== Qualification ==
=== Men's qualification ===
Means of qualification	Date	Venue	Vacancies	Qualifier
Host country	11 June 2014	(Mexico) Veracruz	1	Colombia
CCCAN 2017	22–28 June 2017	(Trinidad and Tobago) Couva	7	Cuba; Venezuela; Puerto Rico; Trinidad and Tobago; Jamaica; Costa Rica
Total			8	

=== Women's qualification ===
Means of qualification	Date	Venue	Vacancies	Qualifier
Host country	11 June 2014	(Mexico) Veracruz	1	Colombia
CCCAN 2017	22–28 June 2017	(Trinidad and Tobago) Couva	5	Cuba; Mexico; Venezuela; Puerto Rico; Trinidad and Tobago
Total			6	

== Men's tournament ==
All times are local (UTC−5).

=== Group stage ===
==== Group A ====
Pos	Team	Pld	W	D	L	GF	GA	GD	Pts
1	Cuba	3	3	0	0	70	13	+57	6
2	Venezuela	3	2	0	1	42	20	+22	4
3	Trinidad and Tobago	3	1	0	2	28	51	−23	2
4	Costa Rica	3	0	0	3	12	68	−56	0

Source: Barranquilla 2018
Rules for classification: 1) points; 2) head-to-head points; 3) head-to-head goal difference; 4) head-to-head number of goals scored; 5) goal difference.

26 July 2018; 17:15	Report	Costa Rica	2–19	Venezuela
26 July 2018; 17:15	Report	Score by quarters: 0–6, 0–4, 2–4, 0–5
26 July 2018; 17:15	Report	Á. Aguilar, K. Aguilar 1	Goals	Velásquez 7

26 July 2018; 18:35	Report	Trinidad and Tobago	2–29	Cuba
26 July 2018; 18:35	Report	Score by quarters: 1–9, 1–4, 0–7, 0–9
26 July 2018; 18:35	Report	George, Sharpe 1	Goals	four players 5

27 July 2018; 17:15	Report	Cuba	31–4	Costa Rica
27 July 2018; 17:15	Report	Score by quarters: 4–2, 9–0, 10–0, 8–2
27 July 2018; 17:15	Report	Jiménez 6	Goals	K. Aguilar 2

27 July 2018; 18:35	Report	Venezuela	16–8	Trinidad and Tobago
27 July 2018; 18:35	Report	Score by quarters: 2–1, 8–1, 4–5, 2–1
27 July 2018; 18:35	Report	Schmidt 4	Goals	Daniel 3

28 July 2018; 17:15	Report	Costa Rica	6–18	Trinidad and Tobago
28 July 2018; 17:15	Report	Score by quarters: 3–1, 1–6, 1–6, 1–5
28 July 2018; 17:15	Report	J. García 3	Goals	Des Vignes, Ferreira 4

28 July 2018; 18:35	Report	Cuba	10–7	Venezuela
28 July 2018; 18:35	Report	Score by quarters: 1–2, 3–2, 2–2, 4–1
28 July 2018; 18:35	Report	Peralta 3	Goals	Schmidt 3

==== Group B ====
Pos	Team	Pld	W	D	L	GF	GA	GD	Pts
1	Colombia (H)	3	2	1	0	40	27	+13	5
2	Mexico	4	2	1	1	37	25	+12	5
3	Puerto Rico	3	1	0	2	34	24	+10	2
4	Jamaica	3	0	0	3	13	48	−35	0

Source: Barranquilla 2018
Rules for classification: 1) points; 2) head-to-head points; 3) head-to-head goal difference; 4) head-to-head number of goals scored; 5) goal difference.
(H) Hosts

26 July 2018; 19:55	Report	Jamaica	6–16	Mexico
26 July 2018; 19:55	Report	Score by quarters: 2–7, 3–3, 0–4, 1–2
26 July 2018; 19:55	Report	Jones, Williams 3	Goals	Ponce 5

26 July 2018; 21:15	Report	Puerto Rico	10–13	Colombia
26 July 2018; 21:15	Report	Score by quarters: 3–3, 1–1, 4–5, 2–4
26 July 2018; 21:15	Report	F. Zayas 4	Goals	A. Hernández 4

27 July 2018; 19:55	Report	Colombia	17–7	Jamaica
27 July 2018; 19:55	Report	Score by quarters: 5–1, 5–1, 2–4, 5–1
27 July 2018; 19:55	Report	A. Hernández, Guarnizo 4	Goals	Garrick 2

27 July 2018; 21:15	Report	Mexico	11–9	Puerto Rico
27 July 2018; 21:15	Report	Score by quarters: 3–1, 2–3, 3–1, 3–3
27 July 2018; 21:15	Report	Ávalos 3	Goals	F. Zayas 3

28 July 2018; 19:55	Report	Jamaica	0–15	Puerto Rico
28 July 2018; 19:55	Report	Score by quarters: 0–4, 0–3, 0–3, 0–5
28 July 2018; 19:55	Report		Goals	Castillo 4

28 July 2018; 21:15	Report	Colombia	10–10	Mexico
28 July 2018; 21:15	Report	Score by quarters: 2–3, 4–2, 3–3, 1–2
28 July 2018; 21:15	Report	Cuervo 3	Goals	Velázquez 3

=== Knockout stage ===
==== Bracket ====
Fifth place
A3	Trinidad and Tobago	8
A2	Venezuela	16
Seventh place
B4	Jamaica	9
A4	Costa Rica	6

5–8th place semifinals
B4	Jamaica	6
A3	Trinidad and Tobago	8
A4	Costa Rica	4
A2	Venezuela	20

Quarterfinals
A1	Cuba	21
B4	Jamaica	4
B2	Mexico	17
A3	Trinidad and Tobago	6
B1	Colombia	22
A4	Costa Rica	4
A2	Venezuela	6
B3	Puerto Rico	8

Semifinals
A1	Cuba	12
B2	Mexico	8
B1	Colombia	8
B3	Puerto Rico	6

Final
A1	Cuba	10
B1	Colombia	12
Third place
B2	Mexico	10
B3	Puerto Rico	11

==== Quarterfinals ====
29 July 2018; 17:15	Report	Cuba	21–4	Jamaica
29 July 2018; 17:15	Report	Score by quarters: 6–0, 5–0, 4–1, 6–3
29 July 2018; 17:15	Report	Peralta 5	Goals	Taylor 2

29 July 2018; 18:35	Report	Colombia	22–4	Costa Rica
29 July 2018; 18:35	Report	Score by quarters: 4–1, 6–2, 5–1, 7–0
29 July 2018; 18:35	Report	A. Hernández 8	Goals	four players 1

29 July 2018; 19:55	Report	Venezuela	6–8	Puerto Rico
29 July 2018; 19:55	Report	Score by quarters: 0–3, 4–1, 1–2, 1–2
29 July 2018; 19:55	Report	Schmidt, Velásquez 2	Goals	Bayo, F. Zayas 2

29 July 2018; 21:15	Report	Mexico	17–6	Trinidad and Tobago
29 July 2018; 21:15	Report	Score by quarters: 4–3, 5–2, 4–0, 4–1
29 July 2018; 21:15	Report	Ponce 6	Goals	Alvarez, Ferreira 2

==== 5–8th place semifinals ====
30 July 2018; 17:15	Report	Jamaica	6–8	Trinidad and Tobago
30 July 2018; 17:15	Report	Score by quarters: 1–1, 2–4, 2–2, 1–1
30 July 2018; 17:15	Report	Jones 3	Goals	Alvarez 4

30 July 2018; 18:45	Report	Costa Rica	4–20	Venezuela
30 July 2018; 18:45	Report	Score by quarters: 0–4, 1–5, 2–4, 1–7
30 July 2018; 18:45	Report	Quesada 2	Goals	Schmidt 5

==== Semifinals ====
31 July 2018; 16:00	Report	Cuba	12–8	Mexico
31 July 2018; 16:00	Report	Score by quarters: 3–1, 4–0, 3–3, 2–4
31 July 2018; 16:00	Report	Peralta 3	Goals	Velázquez 4

31 July 2018; 17:30	Report	Colombia	8–6	Puerto Rico
31 July 2018; 17:30	Report	Score by quarters: 3–1, 2–2, 2–2, 1–1
31 July 2018; 17:30	Report	Idarraga 3	Goals	Loubriel, F. Zayas 3

==== Seventh place game ====
1 August 2018; 17:15	Report	Jamaica	9–6	Costa Rica
1 August 2018; 17:15	Report	Score by quarters: 2–1, 2–1, 2–0, 3–4
1 August 2018; 17:15	Report	Jones 3	Goals	J. García 2

==== Fifth place game ====
1 August 2018; 18:45	Report	Trinidad and Tobago	8–16	Venezuela
1 August 2018; 18:45	Report	Score by quarters: 2–5, 1–5, 3–2, 2–4
1 August 2018; 18:45	Report	Alvarez 2	Goals	Velásquez 5

==== Third place game ====
2 August 2018; 16:00	Report	Mexico	10–11	Puerto Rico
2 August 2018; 16:00	Report	Score by quarters: 1–2, 4–4, 1–4, 4–1
2 August 2018; 16:00	Report	Ponce 5	Goals	F. Zayas 4

==== Final ====
2 August 2018; 17:30	Report	Cuba	10–12	Colombia
2 August 2018; 17:30	Report	Score by quarters: 2–2, 2–3, 3–5, 3–2
2 August 2018; 17:30	Report	Carales 7	Goals	Idarraga 4

=== Final ranking ===
Rank	Team
1st place, gold medalist(s)	Colombia
2nd place, silver medalist(s)	Cuba
3rd place, bronze medalist(s)	Puerto Rico
4	Mexico
5	Venezuela
6	Trinidad and Tobago
7	Jamaica
8	Costa Rica

Team qualified to the 2019 Pan American Games

== Women's tournament ==
=== Group stage ===
All times are local (UTC−5).

Pos	Team	Pld	W	D	L	GF	GA	GD	Pts	Qualification
1	Puerto Rico	5	5	0	0	92	41	+51	10	Semifinals
2	Cuba	5	4	0	1	82	32	+50	8	Semifinals
3	Mexico	5	3	0	2	63	45	+18	6	Quarterfinals
4	Venezuela	5	2	0	3	50	49	+1	4	Quarterfinals
5	Colombia (H)	5	1	0	4	48	72	−24	2	Quarterfinals
6	Trinidad and Tobago	5	0	0	5	19	115	−96	0	Quarterfinals

Source: Barranquilla 2018
Rules for classification: 1) points; 2) head-to-head points; 3) head-to-head goal difference; 4) head-to-head number of goals scored; 5) goal difference.
(H) Hosts

26 July 2018; 13:00	Report	Trinidad and Tobago	3–22	Venezuela
26 July 2018; 13:00	Report	Score by quarters: 2–6, 0–6, 0–5, 1–5
26 July 2018; 13:00	Report	three players 1	Goals	Martínez, S. Torres 5

26 July 2018; 14:20	Report	Mexico	18–10	Colombia
26 July 2018; 14:20	Report	Score by quarters: 4–1, 5–3, 4–4, 5–2
26 July 2018; 14:20	Report	Flores 7	Goals	Marín, Restrepo 3

26 July 2018; 15:40	Report	Cuba	12–13	Puerto Rico
26 July 2018; 15:40	Report	Score by quarters: 5–3, 3–3, 3–5, 1–2
26 July 2018; 15:40	Report	Carrasco, A. González 3	Goals	Am. Ortiz 5

27 July 2018; 13:00	Report	Mexico	22–5	Trinidad and Tobago
27 July 2018; 13:00	Report	Score by quarters: 6–1, 6–1, 4–1, 6–2
27 July 2018; 13:00	Report	Díaz 5	Goals	Ross 3

27 July 2018; 14:20	Report	Venezuela	9–16	Cuba
27 July 2018; 14:20	Report	Score by quarters: 2–2, 2–7, 1–5, 4–2
27 July 2018; 14:20	Report	Araujo 3	Goals	Carrasco 4

27 July 2018; 15:40	Report	Puerto Rico	20–6	Colombia
27 July 2018; 15:40	Report	Score by quarters: 5–1, 6–1, 6–2, 3–2
27 July 2018; 15:40	Report	García, Medina 4	Goals	six players 1

28 July 2018; 13:00	Report	Venezuela	6–16	Puerto Rico
28 July 2018; 13:00	Report	Score by quarters: 3–4, 3–6, 0–4, 0–2
28 July 2018; 13:00	Report	Agelvis, S. Torres 2	Goals	García 5

28 July 2018; 14:20	Report	Cuba	11–4	Mexico
28 July 2018; 14:20	Report	Score by quarters: 3–1, 1–1, 4–2, 3–0
28 July 2018; 14:20	Report	three players 3	Goals	Ramos 2

28 July 2018; 15:40	Report	Trinidad and Tobago	5–20	Colombia
28 July 2018; 15:40	Report	Score by quarters: 0–6, 4–3, 0–4, 1–7
28 July 2018; 15:40	Report	Van Reeken 2	Goals	Marín 7

29 July 2018; 13:00	Report	Mexico	7–5	Venezuela
29 July 2018; 13:00	Report	Score by quarters: 2–3, 3–1, 0–0, 2–1
29 July 2018; 13:00	Report	Díaz 2	Goals	Martínez 2

29 July 2018; 14:20	Report	Colombia	5–21	Cuba
29 July 2018; 14:20	Report	Score by quarters: 0–6, 1–5, 0–6, 4–4
29 July 2018; 14:20	Report	Marín 3	Goals	Chávez 7

29 July 2018; 15:40	Report	Puerto Rico	29–5	Trinidad and Tobago
29 July 2018; 15:40	Report	Score by quarters: 8–2, 6–1, 10–0, 5–2
29 July 2018; 15:40	Report	three players 5	Goals	Ross 2

30 July 2018; 13:00	Report	Cuba	22–1	Trinidad and Tobago
30 July 2018; 13:00	Report	Score by quarters: 8–1, 2–0, 8–0, 4–0
30 July 2018; 13:00	Report	Ramírez 6	Goals	Ross 1

30 July 2018; 14:20	Report	Puerto Rico	14–12	Mexico
30 July 2018; 14:20	Report	Score by quarters: 2–2, 4–3, 3–3, 5–4
30 July 2018; 14:20	Report	Medina 7	Goals	Vizcarra 5

30 July 2018; 15:40	Report	Colombia	7–8	Venezuela
30 July 2018; 15:40	Report	Score by quarters: 1–2, 1–2, 2–1, 3–3
30 July 2018; 15:40	Report	Hernández 3	Goals	Martínez 5

=== Knockout stage ===
==== Bracket ====
Quarterfinals
3	Mexico	13
6	Trinidad and Tobago	3
4	Venezuela (PSO)	17
5	Colombia	16

Semifinals
2	Cuba	14
3	Mexico	6
1	Puerto Rico	16
4	Venezuela	6

Final
2	Cuba	12
1	Puerto Rico	5
Third place
3	Mexico	12
4	Venezuela	11

5th place
6	Trinidad and Tobago	7
5	Colombia	14

==== Quarterfinals ====
31 July 2018; 13:00	Report	Mexico	13–3	Trinidad and Tobago
31 July 2018; 13:00	Report	Score by quarters: 2–0, 6–1, 1–0, 4–2
31 July 2018; 13:00	Report	Carrillo, Murrieta 3	Goals	three players 1

31 July 2018; 14:20	Report	Venezuela	17–16 (PSO)	Colombia
31 July 2018; 14:20	Report	Score by quarters: 2–3, 2–2, 5–3, 1–2 PSO: 7–6
31 July 2018; 14:20	Report	S. Torres 4	Goals	Samboní 3

==== Fifth place game ====
1 August 2018; 13:00	Report	Trinidad and Tobago	7–14	Colombia
1 August 2018; 13:00	Report	Score by quarters: 1–6, 2–3, 3–1, 1–4
1 August 2018; 13:00	Report	Van Reeken 3	Goals	Cortínez 4

==== Semifinals ====
1 August 2018; 14:20	Report	Cuba	14–6	Mexico
1 August 2018; 14:20	Report	Score by quarters: 3–0, 5–2, 1–2, 5–2
1 August 2018; 14:20	Report	Carrasco 4	Goals	Carballo 3

1 August 2018; 14:20	Report	Puerto Rico	16–6	Venezuela
1 August 2018; 14:20	Report	Score by quarters: 4–0, 6–3, 4–1, 2–2
1 August 2018; 14:20	Report	García 3	Goals	Martínez, S. Torres 2

==== Third place game ====
2 August 2018; 13:00	Report	Mexico	12–11	Venezuela
2 August 2018; 13:00	Report	Score by quarters: 3–3, 5–2, 4–3, 0–3
2 August 2018; 13:00	Report	Carballo 4	Goals	S. Torres 4

==== Final ====
2 August 2018; 14:20	Report	Cuba	12–5	Puerto Rico
2 August 2018; 14:20	Report	Score by quarters: 2–2, 5–1, 4–1, 1–1
2 August 2018; 14:20	Report	three players 3	Goals	Medina 2

=== Final ranking ===
Rank	Team
1st place, gold medalist(s)	Cuba
2nd place, silver medalist(s)	Puerto Rico
3rd place, bronze medalist(s)	Mexico
4	Venezuela
5	Colombia
6	Trinidad and Tobago

Team qualified to the 2019 Pan American Games
