= Water polo at the 2011 Pan American Games – Men's tournament =

Men's water polo tournament at the 2011 Pan American Games
- Venue: Scotiabank Aquatics Center
- Dates: October 23 – October 29
- Competitors: 104 from 8 nations

Medalists
Gold medal	United States
Silver medal	Canada
Bronze medal	Brazil

The men's tournament of water polo at the 2011 Pan American Games in Guadalajara, Mexico took place from October 23 to October 29, when the United States defeated Canada 7–3 for the gold medal. All games were held at the Scotiabank Aquatics Center. The defending champions are the United States. The winner of the competition has qualified directly for the 2012 Summer Olympics in London, Great Britain, while the second through fourth-place finishing teams have qualified for the 2012 Men's Water Polo Olympic Games Qualification Tournament that was held in Edmonton, Canada.

== Qualification ==
A National Olympic Committee may enter one men's team for the water polo competition. Mexico, the host nation along with seven other countries qualified through regional competitions.

Event	Date	Location	Vacancies	Qualified
Host Nation	–	–	1	Mexico
2010 South American Games*	March 20–25, 2010	(Colombia) Medellín	3	Argentina; Colombia; Brazil
2010 Central American and Caribbean Games ^{1}	July 26–31, 2010	(Puerto Rico) Mayagüez	1	Venezuela
Replaced Puerto Rico ^{2}	–	–	1	Cuba
Zone 3	–	–	1	United States
Zone 4	–	–	1	Canada
TOTAL			8	

^1 At the Central American and Caribbean Games, Venezuela competed, and finished higher than Trinidad and Tobago, but this qualifying round is open to nations from CCCAN only.
^2 Puerto Rico withdrew and were replaced by Cuba.

== Format ==
- Eight teams are split into 2 preliminary round groups of 4 teams each. The top 2 teams from each group qualify for the knockout stage.
- The third and fourth placed each group will crossover and play each other in the fifth to eighth place bracket.
- In the semifinals, the matchups are as follows: A1 vs. B2 and B1 vs. A2
- The winning teams from the semifinals play for the gold medal. The losing teams compete for the bronze medal.

== Preliminary round ==
All times are local Central Daylight Time (UTC−5)

Qualified for the semifinals

=== Group A ===
Team	GP	W	D	L	GF	GA	GD	Pts
Canada	3	3	0	0	46	21	+25	6
Cuba	3	2	0	1	30	33	-3	4
Mexico	3	1	0	2	24	35	-11	2
Colombia	3	0	0	3	29	40	-11	0

October 23, 2011; 17:00	Report	Colombia	11–12	Cuba	Scotiabank Aquatics Center, Guadalajara; Referees: Valcarce (ARG), Werner (BRA)
October 23, 2011; 17:00	Report	Score by quarters: 2 – 2, 3 – 3, 4 – 5, 2 – 2			Scotiabank Aquatics Center, Guadalajara; Referees: Valcarce (ARG), Werner (BRA)
October 23, 2011; 17:00	Report	Idarraga 3	Goals	Cisneros 5	Scotiabank Aquatics Center, Guadalajara; Referees: Valcarce (ARG), Werner (BRA)

October 23, 2011; 18:15	Report	Canada	16–4	Mexico	Scotiabank Aquatics Center, Guadalajara; Referees: Moller (ARG), Wittstock (USA)
October 23, 2011; 18:15	Report	Score by quarters: 0 – 3, 0 – 6, 1 – 3, 3 – 4			Scotiabank Aquatics Center, Guadalajara; Referees: Moller (ARG), Wittstock (USA)
October 23, 2011; 18:15	Report	Graham 4	Goals	Perez, Garcia 2	Scotiabank Aquatics Center, Guadalajara; Referees: Moller (ARG), Wittstock (USA)

October 24, 2011; 15:46	Report	Canada	15–10	Cuba	Scotiabank Aquatics Center, Guadalajara; Referees: Parades (COL), Stampalija (CRO)
October 24, 2011; 15:46	Report	Score by quarters: 4 – 3, 4 – 4, 3 – 1, 4 – 2			Scotiabank Aquatics Center, Guadalajara; Referees: Parades (COL), Stampalija (CRO)
October 24, 2011; 15:46	Report	Graham, Constantin 4	Goals	3 players 2	Scotiabank Aquatics Center, Guadalajara; Referees: Parades (COL), Stampalija (CRO)

October 24, 2011; 18:15	Report	Colombia	11–13	Mexico	Scotiabank Aquatics Center, Guadalajara; Referees: Dester (BRA), Redding (USA)
October 24, 2011; 18:15	Report	Score by quarters: 2 – 3, 4 – 2, 1 – 4, 4 – 4			Scotiabank Aquatics Center, Guadalajara; Referees: Dester (BRA), Redding (USA)
October 24, 2011; 18:15	Report	Idarraga 3	Goals	Garcia 4	Scotiabank Aquatics Center, Guadalajara; Referees: Dester (BRA), Redding (USA)

October 25, 2011; 15:45	Report	Canada	15–7	Colombia	Scotiabank Aquatics Center, Guadalajara; Referees: Moller (ARG), Maretzki (USA)
October 25, 2011; 15:45	Report	Score by quarters: 4 – 2, 2 – 1, 6 – 1, 3 – 3			Scotiabank Aquatics Center, Guadalajara; Referees: Moller (ARG), Maretzki (USA)
October 25, 2011; 15:45	Report	Constantin 3	Goals	Bejarano, Montoya 2	Scotiabank Aquatics Center, Guadalajara; Referees: Moller (ARG), Maretzki (USA)

October 25, 2011; 18:15	Report	Mexico	7–8	Cuba	Scotiabank Aquatics Center, Guadalajara; Attendance: Werner (BRA), Arnoldo (VEN)
October 25, 2011; 18:15	Report	Score by quarters: 2 – 3, 2 – 1, 1 – 1, 2 – 3			Scotiabank Aquatics Center, Guadalajara; Attendance: Werner (BRA), Arnoldo (VEN)
October 25, 2011; 18:15	Report	O'Brien Jr. 3	Goals	Jimenez, Cisneros 2	Scotiabank Aquatics Center, Guadalajara; Attendance: Werner (BRA), Arnoldo (VEN)

=== Group B ===
Team	GP	W	D	L	GF	GA	GD	Pts
United States	3	3	0	0	37	15	+22	6
Brazil	3	2	0	1	34	26	+8	4
Argentina	3	1	0	2	23	30	-7	2
Venezuela	3	0	0	3	20	43	-23	0

October 23, 2011; 14:30	Report	United States	16–3	Venezuela	Scotiabank Aquatics Center, Guadalajara; Referees: Dykman (CAN) and Callejas (MEX)
October 23, 2011; 14:30	Report	Score by quarters: 7 – 0, 5 – 2, 3 – 1, 1 – 0			Scotiabank Aquatics Center, Guadalajara; Referees: Dykman (CAN) and Callejas (MEX)
October 23, 2011; 14:30	Report	Hutten 4	Goals	3 players, 1	Scotiabank Aquatics Center, Guadalajara; Referees: Dykman (CAN) and Callejas (MEX)

October 23, 2011; 15:45	Report	Argentina	8–10	Brazil	Scotiabank Aquatics Center, Guadalajara; Referees: Menendez (CUB), Stampalija (CRO)
October 23, 2011; 15:45	Report	Score by quarters: 2 – 3, 1 – 1, 3 – 3, 2 – 2			Scotiabank Aquatics Center, Guadalajara; Referees: Menendez (CUB), Stampalija (CRO)
October 23, 2011; 15:45	Report	Echenique 3	Goals	4 players 2	Scotiabank Aquatics Center, Guadalajara; Referees: Menendez (CUB), Stampalija (CRO)

October 24, 2011; 14:30	Report	United States	8–5	Brazil	Scotiabank Aquatics Center, Guadalajara; Referees: Menendez (CUB), Bohm (AHO)
October 24, 2011; 14:30	Report	Score by quarters: 2 - 0, 2 - 2, 1 - 2, 3 - 1			Scotiabank Aquatics Center, Guadalajara; Referees: Menendez (CUB), Bohm (AHO)
October 24, 2011; 14:30	Report	Bailey, Hutten 3	Goals	5 players, 1	Scotiabank Aquatics Center, Guadalajara; Referees: Menendez (CUB), Bohm (AHO)

October 24, 2011; 17:00	Report	Argentina	8–7	Venezuela	Scotiabank Aquatics Center, Guadalajara; Referees: Mejia (MEX), Burt (CAN)
October 24, 2011; 17:00	Report	Score by quarters: 2 - 1, 4 - 0, 1 - 2, 1 - 4			Scotiabank Aquatics Center, Guadalajara; Referees: Mejia (MEX), Burt (CAN)
October 24, 2011; 17:00	Report	Yañez 3	Goals	Fernandez 3	Scotiabank Aquatics Center, Guadalajara; Referees: Mejia (MEX), Burt (CAN)

October 25, 2011; 14:30	Report	United States	15–7	Argentina	Scotiabank Aquatics Center, Guadalajara; Referees: Del Valle (PUR), Madera (CUB)
October 25, 2011; 14:30	Report	Score by quarters: 3 - 2, 3 - 2, 4 - 2, 3 - 1			Scotiabank Aquatics Center, Guadalajara; Referees: Del Valle (PUR), Madera (CUB)
October 25, 2011; 14:30	Report	Powers 3	Goals	Echenique 2	Scotiabank Aquatics Center, Guadalajara; Referees: Del Valle (PUR), Madera (CUB)

October 25, 2011; 17:00	Report	Venezuela	10–19	Brazil	Scotiabank Aquatics Center, Guadalajara; Referees: Stampalija (CRO), Callejas (MEX)
October 25, 2011; 17:00	Report	Score by quarters: 1 - 2, 4 - 5, 5 - 6, 0 - 6			Scotiabank Aquatics Center, Guadalajara; Referees: Stampalija (CRO), Callejas (MEX)
October 25, 2011; 17:00	Report	3 players, 2	Goals	Emilio Vieira 4	Scotiabank Aquatics Center, Guadalajara; Referees: Stampalija (CRO), Callejas (MEX)

== Elimination stage ==
=== Crossover ===
October 27, 2011; 12:30	Report	Colombia	9–10	Argentina	Scotiabank Aquatics Center, Guadalajara
October 27, 2011; 12:30	Report	Score by quarters: 3–4, 4–3, 1–3, 1–1			Scotiabank Aquatics Center, Guadalajara

October 27, 2011; 14:00	Report	Venezuela	5–7	Mexico	Scotiabank Aquatics Center, Guadalajara
October 27, 2011; 14:00	Report	Score by quarters: 2–1, 2–3, 1–1, 0–2			Scotiabank Aquatics Center, Guadalajara

=== Seventh place match ===
October 29, 2011; 12:30	Report	Colombia	11–9	Venezuela	Scotiabank Aquatics Center, Guadalajara
October 29, 2011; 12:30	Report	Score by quarters: 2–0, 3–5, 1–1, 5–3			Scotiabank Aquatics Center, Guadalajara
October 29, 2011; 12:30	Report	Bejarano 3	Goals	Fernandez 3	Scotiabank Aquatics Center, Guadalajara

=== Fifth place match ===
October 29, 2011; 14:00	Report	Argentina	12–10	Mexico	Scotiabank Aquatics Center, Guadalajara
October 29, 2011; 14:00	Report	Score by quarters: 4–2, 1–1, 5–2, 2–5			Scotiabank Aquatics Center, Guadalajara
October 29, 2011; 14:00	Report	Enchenique 5	Goals	Pulido 6	Scotiabank Aquatics Center, Guadalajara

=== Finals Bracket ===
Semi-finals
October 27
Cuba	2
United States	12
October 27
Brazil	6
Canada	8

Final
October 29
United States	7
Canada	3
Third place
October 29
Cuba	7
Brazil	14

=== Semifinals ===
October 27, 2011; 15:30	Report	Cuba	2–12	United States	Scotiabank Aquatics Center, Guadalajara; Referees: Bohm (AHO), Stampalija (CRO)
October 27, 2011; 15:30	Report	Score by quarters: 0 – 4, 0 – 2, 2 – 2, 0 – 4			Scotiabank Aquatics Center, Guadalajara; Referees: Bohm (AHO), Stampalija (CRO)
October 27, 2011; 15:30	Report	Jimenez 2	Goals	Powers 3	Scotiabank Aquatics Center, Guadalajara; Referees: Bohm (AHO), Stampalija (CRO)

October 27, 2011; 17:00	Report	Brazil	6–8	Canada	Scotiabank Aquatics Center, Guadalajara
October 27, 2011; 17:00	Report	Score by quarters: 4 – 1, 0 – 1, 1 – 3, 1 – 3			Scotiabank Aquatics Center, Guadalajara
October 27, 2011; 17:00	Report	Crivella 2	Goals	Graham 3	Scotiabank Aquatics Center, Guadalajara

=== Bronze medal match ===
October 29, 2011; 15:30	Report	Brazil	14–7	Cuba	Scotiabank Aquatics Center, Guadalajara; Referees: Bohm (AHO), Valcarce (ARG)
October 29, 2011; 15:30	Report	Score by quarters: 4 – 4, 3 – 0, 2 – 3, 5 – 0			Scotiabank Aquatics Center, Guadalajara; Referees: Bohm (AHO), Valcarce (ARG)
October 29, 2011; 15:30	Report	Rocha 3	Goals	Rivas 4	Scotiabank Aquatics Center, Guadalajara; Referees: Bohm (AHO), Valcarce (ARG)

=== Gold medal match ===
October 29, 2011; 17:00	Report	United States	7–3	Canada	Scotiabank Aquatics Center, Guadalajara; Referees: Stampalija (CRO), Werner (BRA)
October 29, 2011; 17:00	Report	Score by quarters: 2–1, 2–1, 1–0, 2–1			Scotiabank Aquatics Center, Guadalajara; Referees: Stampalija (CRO), Werner (BRA)
October 29, 2011; 17:00	Report	Azevedo 3	Goals	Graham 2	Scotiabank Aquatics Center, Guadalajara; Referees: Stampalija (CRO), Werner (BRA)

2011 Pan American Games winners

United States
11th title

== Final standings ==
Rank	Team	Record	Olympic Qualification
1st place, gold medalist(s)	United States	5 – 0 – 0	Qualifies directly for 2012 Olympic Games
2nd place, silver medalist(s)	Canada	4 – 0 – 1	2012 Men's Water Polo Olympic Games Qualification Tournament
3rd place, bronze medalist(s)	Brazil	3 – 0 – 2	2012 Men's Water Polo Olympic Games Qualification Tournament
4	Cuba	2 – 0 – 3	Declined invitation to 2012 Men's Water Polo Olympic Games Qualification Tournament
5	Argentina	3 – 0 – 2	2012 Men's Water Polo Olympic Games Qualification Tournament
6	Mexico	2 – 0 – 3	Declined invitation to 2012 Men's Water Polo Olympic Games Qualification Tournament
7	Colombia	1 – 0 – 4	Declined invitation to 2012 Men's Water Polo Olympic Games Qualification Tournament
8	Venezuela	0 – 0 – 5	2012 Men's Water Polo Olympic Games Qualification Tournament
