= Water polo at the 2010 Central American and Caribbean Games =

- Venue: Natatorio RUM
- Location: Mayagüez
- Dates: 26-31 July

Medalists
gold medal	Colombia - men's
gold medal	Puerto Rico - women's
silver medal	Venezuela
silver medal	Venezuela
bronze medal	Mexico
bronze medal	Mexico

The Water polo competition at the 2010 Central American and Caribbean Games was held in Mayagüez, Puerto Rico.

The tournaments was scheduled to be held from 26–31 July at the Natatorio RUM in Mayagüez.

== Men's tournament ==
Team	Pld	W	D	L	GF	GA	GD	Pts
Colombia	6	6	0	0	105	30	+75	12
Venezuela	6	4	0	2	97	42	+55	8
Mexico	6	4	0	2	94	49	+45	8
Puerto Rico	6	4	0	2	79	44	+35	8
Trinidad and Tobago	6	2	0	4	67	84	−17	4
Netherlands Antilles	6	1	0	5	32	111	−79	2
Guatemala	6	0	0	6	18	132	−114	0

26 July 2010	Venezuela	21–8	Trinidad and Tobago	Natatorio RUM
26 July 2010	Score by quarters: 5–3, 2–2, 8–2, 6–1			Natatorio RUM

26 July 2010	Puerto Rico	21–1	Netherlands Antilles	Natatorio RUM
26 July 2010	Score by quarters: 9–0, 5–0, 4–1, 3–0			Natatorio RUM

26 July 2010	Mexico	8–14	Colombia	Natatorio RUM
26 July 2010	Score by quarters: 1–3, 2–2, 3–4, 2–5			Natatorio RUM

26 July 2010	Trinidad and Tobago	17–10	Netherlands Antilles	Natatorio RUM
26 July 2010	Score by quarters: 5–2, 3–1, 3–4, 6–3			Natatorio RUM

26 July 2010	Venezuela	6–12	Colombia	Natatorio RUM
26 July 2010	Score by quarters: 1–3, 2–4, 1–4, 2–1			Natatorio RUM

26 July 2010	Puerto Rico	19–6	Guatemala	Natatorio RUM
26 July 2010	Score by quarters: 3–0, 6–0, 6–3, 4–3			Natatorio RUM

27 July 2010	Netherlands Antilles	2–23	Colombia	Natatorio RUM
27 July 2010	Score by quarters: 0–4, 1–4, 0–9, 1–6			Natatorio RUM

27 July 2010	Trinidad and Tobago	18–0	Guatemala	Natatorio RUM
27 July 2010	Score by quarters: 4–0, 5–0, 2–0, 7–0			Natatorio RUM

27 July 2010	Venezuela	14–8	Mexico	Natatorio RUM
27 July 2010	Score by quarters: 5–3, 5–1, 2–4, 2–0			Natatorio RUM

27 July 2010	Colombia	27–4	Guatemala	Natatorio RUM
27 July 2010	Score by quarters: 7–1, 8–1, 4–2, 8–0			Natatorio RUM

27 July 2010	Netherlands Antilles	3–25	Mexico	Natatorio RUM
27 July 2010	Score by quarters: 0–4, 0–5, 0–8, 3–8			Natatorio RUM

27 July 2010	Trinidad and Tobago	10–16	Puerto Rico	Natatorio RUM
27 July 2010	Score by quarters: 2–4, 2–4, 3–4, 3–4			Natatorio RUM

28 July 2010	Guatemala	1–26	Mexico	Natatorio RUM
28 July 2010	Score by quarters: 1–6, 0–6, 0–6, 0–8			Natatorio RUM

28 July 2010	Colombia	11–6	Puerto Rico	Natatorio RUM
28 July 2010	Score by quarters: 2–2, 3–2, 3–2, 3–0			Natatorio RUM

28 July 2010	Netherlands Antilles	1–21	Venezuela	Natatorio RUM
28 July 2010	Score by quarters: 0–8, 0–5, 0–4, 1–4			Natatorio RUM

28 July 2010	Mexico	8–7	Puerto Rico	Natatorio RUM
28 July 2010	Score by quarters: 2–5, 3–1, 2–0, 1–1			Natatorio RUM

28 July 2010	Guatemala	3–27	Venezuela	Natatorio RUM
28 July 2010	Score by quarters: 1–5, 0–7, 1–8, 1–7			Natatorio RUM

28 July 2010	Colombia	18–4	Trinidad and Tobago	Natatorio RUM
28 July 2010	Score by quarters: 3–2, 5–1, 4–1, 6–0			Natatorio RUM

29 July 2010	Puerto Rico	10–8	Venezuela	Natatorio RUM
29 July 2010	Score by quarters: 3–2, 4–2, 3–3, 0–1			Natatorio RUM

29 July 2010	Mexico	19–10	Trinidad and Tobago	Natatorio RUM
29 July 2010	Score by quarters: 1–3, 7–3, 5–1, 6–3			Natatorio RUM

29 July 2010	Guatemala	4–15	Netherlands Antilles	Natatorio RUM
29 July 2010	Score by quarters: 1–2, 0–4, 1–3, 2–6			Natatorio RUM

=== Medal round ===
Semi-finals
July 30 – Natatorio RUM
Colombia	8
Puerto Rico	7
July 30 – Natatorio RUM
Venezuela	13
Mexico	6

Final
July 31 – Natatorio RUM
Colombia	6
Venezuela	4
Bronze-final
July 31 – Natatorio RUM
Puerto Rico	7
Mexico	9

=== Classification round ===
Semi-finals
July 30 – Natatorio RUM
Guatemala	5
Netherlands Antilles	9
July 30 – Natatorio RUM
Trinidad and Tobago
Bye

5th place
July 31 – Natatorio RUM
Trinidad and Tobago	11
Netherlands Antilles	9
7th place
July 31 – Natatorio RUM
Guatemala
Bye

== Women's tournament ==
Team	Pld	W	D	L	GF	GA	GD	Pts
Puerto Rico	4	4	0	0	56	28	+30	8
Venezuela	4	2	0	2	37	42	–5	6
Mexico	4	0	0	4	29	52	−23	4

26 July 2010	Venezuela	7–11	Puerto Rico	Natatorio RUM
26 July 2010	Score by quarters: 2–4, 0–3, 3–3, 2–1			Natatorio RUM

27 July 2010	Puerto Rico	19–3	Mexico	Natatorio RUM
27 July 2010	Score by quarters: 6–1, 5–0, 6–2, 2–0			Natatorio RUM

28 July 2010	Mexico	9–13	Venezuela	Natatorio RUM
28 July 2010	Score by quarters: 2–3, 0–1, 2–6, 5–3			Natatorio RUM

29 July 2010	Puerto Rico	15–8	Venezuela	Natatorio RUM
29 July 2010	Score by quarters: 4–3, 5–2, 3–1, 3–2			Natatorio RUM

29 July 2010	Mexico	10–11	Puerto Rico	Natatorio RUM
29 July 2010	Score by quarters: 2–3, 3–3, 3–3, 2–2			Natatorio RUM

30 July 2010	Venezuela	9–7	Mexico	Natatorio RUM
30 July 2010	Score by quarters: 1–1, 4–2, 2–2, 2–2			Natatorio RUM

=== Final ===
31 July 2010	Puerto Rico	12–6	Venezuela	Natatorio RUM
31 July 2010	Score by quarters: 2–1, 2–4, 1–1, 7–0			Natatorio RUM
