= Water polo at the 2012 Summer Olympics – Men's qualification =

The 2012 Men's Water Polo Olympic Qualification Tournament was held at the Kinsman Sports Centre in Edmonton, Alberta, Canada, from 1 to 8 April 2012.

== Participants ==
There were 12 places originally allocated to continental associations in the tournament not already directly qualified to the Olympics – 5 from Europe, 3 from the Americas, 2 from Asia, 1 from Africa, and 1 from Oceania.

Montenegro, Germany, Greece, Spain and Romania qualified from the 2012 European Water Polo Championships and confirmed their attendance at the tournament. Canada qualified from the Americas as host country. Brazil and Cuba qualified from the 2011 Pan American Games, Brazil confirmed their attendance, but Cuba declined and was replaced by Argentina, the next ranked team in the 2011 Pan American Games.

No teams from Asia, Africa and Oceania applied to participate in the qualification tournament. There was an article written by a FINA press correspondent in Japan showing confusion around the qualification procedure from the 2012 Asian Water Polo Championship, as the article states that the winners of the Asian Championship had advanced to this qualification tournament (in fact, they qualified directly for the Olympics) and that Japan could no longer get to the Olympics (in fact, according to FINA By-Laws, they were eligible for this tournament, and they did not apply). The next highest placed teams from the other continents were invited to take these four available places, in the following rotation:

- Host continent (Americas)
- Americas
- Asia
- Europe
- Oceania
- Africa

In the first rotation, the next-placed teams in the 2011 Pan American Games, Mexico and Colombia, declined to participate, but Venezuela, the last-placed team, did decide to sign-up for the tournament using the host continent place. As there were no remaining American, Asian, Oceanian, nor African teams making themselves available for selection, the next three places went to the three participants in the 2012 European Water Polo Championships that were not already either qualified for the Olympics or already in this tournament - the Netherlands, Macedonia and Turkey.

Europe	How qualified
Montenegro	2nd, 2012 European Water Polo Championships
Germany	5th, 2012 European Water Polo Championships
Greece	6th, 2012 European Water Polo Championships
Spain	7th, 2012 European Water Polo Championships
Romania	8th, 2012 European Water Polo Championships
Netherlands	10th, 2012 European Water Polo Championships
North Macedonia	11th, 2012 European Water Polo Championships
Turkey	12th, 2012 European Water Polo Championships
Americas	
Canada	Host country
Brazil	3rd, 2011 Pan American Games
Argentina	5th, 2011 Pan American Games
~~Venezuela~~
Asia	
	no entries
Africa	
	no entries
Oceania	
	no entries

== Draw ==
The draw took place on 19 February 2012 at 12:00 at the Crowne Plaza, London Docklands. There are six teams in each preliminary round group. Each team was drawn from a draw line of two teams based on their results, first in the last World Championships, then by their last continental championships.

Draw line	Country	Status	Drawn into group	Country	Status	Drawn into group
Line 1	Spain	5th, 2011 World Championships	B	Montenegro	7th, 2011 World Championships	A
Line 2	Germany	8th, 2011 World Championships	A	Canada	10th, 2011 World Championships	B
Line 3	Romania	12th, 2011 World Championships	A	Brazil	14th, 2011 World Championships	B
Line 4	Greece	6th, 2012 European Water Polo Championships	A	Argentina	5th, 2011 Pan American Games	B
Line 5	Netherlands	10th, 2012 European Water Polo Championships	A	~~Venezuela~~		~~B~~
Line 6	North Macedonia	11th, 2012 European Water Polo Championships	A	Turkey	12th, 2012 European Water Polo Championships	B

- Venezuela withdrew.

After being drawn into Group A and B, the teams drew numbers from 1 to 6 to determine the order of matches.

	Group A		Group B
1	Montenegro	1	Venezuela
2	Germany	2	Turkey
3	Greece	3	Spain
4	North Macedonia	4	Brazil
5	Romania	5	Argentina
6	Netherlands	6	Canada

== Preliminary round ==
All times are local (UTC−6)

=== Group A ===
	Team	G	W	D	L	GF	GA	Diff	Points
1.	Montenegro	5	5	0	0	59	34	+25	10
2.	Romania	5	3	0	2	43	44	−1	6
3.	Greece	5	3	0	2	53	34	+19	6
4.	North Macedonia	5	2	0	3	29	45	−16	4
5.	Germany	5	2	0	3	41	43	−2	4
6.	Netherlands	5	0	0	5	28	53	−25	0

1 April 2012; 13:50	Report	Montenegro	12–6	Netherlands	Kinsman Sports Centre, Edmonton; Referees: Borrell, Terpenka
1 April 2012; 13:50	Report	Score by quarters: 2–1, 4–2, 4–1, 2–2			Kinsman Sports Centre, Edmonton; Referees: Borrell, Terpenka
1 April 2012; 13:50	Report	Petrović 3	Goals	Kramer 2	Kinsman Sports Centre, Edmonton; Referees: Borrell, Terpenka

1 April 2012; 15:10	Report	Greece	12–2	North Macedonia	Kinsman Sports Centre, Edmonton; Referees: Gomez, Rotstart
1 April 2012; 15:10	Report	Score by quarters: 1–0, 3–2, 3–0, 5–0			Kinsman Sports Centre, Edmonton; Referees: Gomez, Rotstart
1 April 2012; 15:10	Report	Fountoulis 5	Goals	Čuk 2	Kinsman Sports Centre, Edmonton; Referees: Gomez, Rotstart

1 April 2012; 16:30	Report	Germany	10–9	Romania	Kinsman Sports Centre, Edmonton; Referees: Peris, Flahive
1 April 2012; 16:30	Report	Score by quarters: 3–2, 4–4, 0–1, 3–2			Kinsman Sports Centre, Edmonton; Referees: Peris, Flahive
1 April 2012; 16:30	Report	Politze 3	Goals	Radu 4	Kinsman Sports Centre, Edmonton; Referees: Peris, Flahive

2 April 2012; 15:40	Report	Netherlands	6–9	North Macedonia	Kinsman Sports Centre, Edmonton; Referees: Filiksac, Werner
2 April 2012; 15:40	Report	Score by quarters: 1–1, 0–3, 3–3, 2–2			Kinsman Sports Centre, Edmonton; Referees: Filiksac, Werner
2 April 2012; 15:40	Report	Kramer, Lindhout 2	Goals	Aksentijević 3	Kinsman Sports Centre, Edmonton; Referees: Filiksac, Werner

2 April 2012; 17:00	Report	Romania	10–9	Greece	Kinsman Sports Centre, Edmonton; Referees: Peris, Terpenka
2 April 2012; 17:00	Report	Score by quarters: 2–3, 3–2, 2–2, 3–2			Kinsman Sports Centre, Edmonton; Referees: Peris, Terpenka
2 April 2012; 17:00	Report	Radu 4	Goals	three players 2	Kinsman Sports Centre, Edmonton; Referees: Peris, Terpenka

2 April 2012; 18:20	Report	Montenegro	11–7	Germany	Kinsman Sports Centre, Edmonton; Referees: Gomez, Borrell
2 April 2012; 18:20	Report	Score by quarters: 4–0, 3–2, 3–4, 1–1			Kinsman Sports Centre, Edmonton; Referees: Gomez, Borrell
2 April 2012; 18:20	Report	Ivović, Janović 3	Goals	Oeler, Stamm 2	Kinsman Sports Centre, Edmonton; Referees: Gomez, Borrell

3 April 2012; 14:20	Report	North Macedonia	6–9	Romania	Kinsman Sports Centre, Edmonton; Referees: Peris, Filiksac
3 April 2012; 14:20	Report	Score by quarters: 2–1, 1–2, 2–4, 1–2			Kinsman Sports Centre, Edmonton; Referees: Peris, Filiksac
3 April 2012; 14:20	Report	Aksentijević 3	Goals	three players 2	Kinsman Sports Centre, Edmonton; Referees: Peris, Filiksac

3 April 2012; 15:40	Report	Germany	11–6	Netherlands	Kinsman Sports Centre, Edmonton; Referees: Borrell, Werner
3 April 2012; 15:40	Report	Score by quarters: 5–3, 3–1, 1–1, 2–1			Kinsman Sports Centre, Edmonton; Referees: Borrell, Werner
3 April 2012; 15:40	Report	three players 2	Goals	Gielen, Lindhout 2	Kinsman Sports Centre, Edmonton; Referees: Borrell, Werner

3 April 2012; 17:00	Report	Greece	7–8	Montenegro	Kinsman Sports Centre, Edmonton; Referees: Flahive, Rotstart
3 April 2012; 17:00	Report	Score by quarters: 1–2, 1–2, 2–2, 3–2			Kinsman Sports Centre, Edmonton; Referees: Flahive, Rotstart
3 April 2012; 17:00	Report	C.Afroudakis 3	Goals	Janović 3	Kinsman Sports Centre, Edmonton; Referees: Flahive, Rotstart

4 April 2012; 15:40	Report	Netherlands	5–7	Romania	Kinsman Sports Centre, Edmonton; Referees: Terpenka, Filiksac
4 April 2012; 15:40	Report	Score by quarters: 1–1, 3–3, 0–2, 1–1			Kinsman Sports Centre, Edmonton; Referees: Terpenka, Filiksac
4 April 2012; 15:40	Report	five players 1	Goals	Radu 2	Kinsman Sports Centre, Edmonton; Referees: Terpenka, Filiksac

4 April 2012; 17:00	Report	Montenegro	14–6	North Macedonia	Kinsman Sports Centre, Edmonton; Referees: Rotstart, Werner
4 April 2012; 17:00	Report	Score by quarters: 3–0, 4–1, 4–2, 3–3			Kinsman Sports Centre, Edmonton; Referees: Rotstart, Werner
4 April 2012; 17:00	Report	Radović 3	Goals	Dimovski 2	Kinsman Sports Centre, Edmonton; Referees: Rotstart, Werner

4 April 2012; 18:20	Report	Germany	9–11	Greece	Kinsman Sports Centre, Edmonton; Referees: Gomez, Peris
4 April 2012; 18:20	Report	Score by quarters: 2–4, 2–2, 2–3, 3–2			Kinsman Sports Centre, Edmonton; Referees: Gomez, Peris
4 April 2012; 18:20	Report	Oeler, Schueler 3	Goals	five players 2	Kinsman Sports Centre, Edmonton; Referees: Gomez, Peris

5 April 2012; 14:20	Report	Greece	14–5	Netherlands	Kinsman Sports Centre, Edmonton; Referees: Terpenka, Peris
5 April 2012; 14:20	Report	Score by quarters: 2–1, 3–0, 4–1, 5–3			Kinsman Sports Centre, Edmonton; Referees: Terpenka, Peris
5 April 2012; 14:20	Report	C.Afroudakis 4, Fountoulis 3	Goals	Lindhout 2	Kinsman Sports Centre, Edmonton; Referees: Terpenka, Peris

5 April 2012; 15:40	Report	North Macedonia	6–4	Germany	Kinsman Sports Centre, Edmonton; Referees: Werner, Smit
5 April 2012; 15:40	Report	Score by quarters: 0–2, 2–1, 4–1, 0–0			Kinsman Sports Centre, Edmonton; Referees: Werner, Smit
5 April 2012; 15:40	Report	Ranđić 3	Goals	four players 1	Kinsman Sports Centre, Edmonton; Referees: Werner, Smit

5 April 2012; 17:00	Report	Montenegro	14–8	Romania	Kinsman Sports Centre, Edmonton; Referees: Rotstart, Flahive
5 April 2012; 17:00	Report	Score by quarters: 3–2, 5–2, 3–3, 3–1			Kinsman Sports Centre, Edmonton; Referees: Rotstart, Flahive
5 April 2012; 17:00	Report	Ivović, Zloković 3	Goals	Matei Guiman, Georgescu 2	Kinsman Sports Centre, Edmonton; Referees: Rotstart, Flahive

=== Group B ===
	Team	G	W	D	L	GF	GA	Diff	Points
1.	Spain	4	4	0	0	61	21	+40	8
2.	Canada	4	3	0	1	45	28	+17	6
3.	Brazil	4	1	1	2	43	47	−4	3
4.	Turkey	4	0	2	2	27	55	−28	2
5.	Argentina	4	0	1	3	27	52	−25	1

1 April 2012; 17:50	Report	Spain	17–7	Brazil	Kinsman Sports Centre, Edmonton; Referees: Alexandresa, Bender
1 April 2012; 17:50	Report	Score by quarters: 3–2, 4–3, 6–1, 4–1			Kinsman Sports Centre, Edmonton; Referees: Alexandresa, Bender
1 April 2012; 17:50	Report	Perrone 4	Goals	Miranda, Rocha 3	Kinsman Sports Centre, Edmonton; Referees: Alexandresa, Bender

1 April 2012; 20:00	Report	Turkey	9–9	Argentina	Kinsman Sports Centre, Edmonton; Referees: Smit, Ađić
1 April 2012; 20:00	Report	Score by quarters: 2–3, 2–2, 2–2, 3–2			Kinsman Sports Centre, Edmonton; Referees: Smit, Ađić
1 April 2012; 20:00	Report	Okman 3	Goals	Caranantes 4	Kinsman Sports Centre, Edmonton; Referees: Smit, Ađić

2 April 2012; 14:20	Report	Argentina	6–14	Spain	Kinsman Sports Centre, Edmonton; Referees: Vasileiou, Damčevski
2 April 2012; 14:20	Report	Score by quarters: 1–5, 1–2, 3–2, 1–5			Kinsman Sports Centre, Edmonton; Referees: Vasileiou, Damčevski
2 April 2012; 14:20	Report	Echenique, Yanez 2	Goals	García 3	Kinsman Sports Centre, Edmonton; Referees: Vasileiou, Damčevski

2 April 2012; 19:40	Report	Canada	12–9	Brazil	Kinsman Sports Centre, Edmonton; Referees: Flahive, Bender
2 April 2012; 19:40	Report	Score by quarters: 2–1, 1–2, 6–2, 3–4			Kinsman Sports Centre, Edmonton; Referees: Flahive, Bender
2 April 2012; 19:40	Report	Graham 3	Goals	Silva 4	Kinsman Sports Centre, Edmonton; Referees: Flahive, Bender

3 April 2012; 18:20	Report	Brazil	16–7	Argentina	Kinsman Sports Centre, Edmonton; Referees: Alexandrescu, Damčevski
3 April 2012; 18:20	Report	Score by quarters: 4–1, 6–2, 3–1, 3–3			Kinsman Sports Centre, Edmonton; Referees: Alexandrescu, Damčevski
3 April 2012; 18:20	Report	Guimaraes, Rocha 5	Goals	Arregui 3	Kinsman Sports Centre, Edmonton; Referees: Alexandrescu, Damčevski

3 April 2012; 19:40	Report	Turkey	5–14	Canada	Kinsman Sports Centre, Edmonton; Referees: Vasileiou, Smit
3 April 2012; 19:40	Report	Score by quarters: 2–4, 1–3, 0–3, 2–4			Kinsman Sports Centre, Edmonton; Referees: Vasileiou, Smit
3 April 2012; 19:40	Report	Beskardesler, Okman 2	Goals	Graham 4	Kinsman Sports Centre, Edmonton; Referees: Vasileiou, Smit

4 April 2012; 14:20	Report	Turkey	2–21	Spain	Kinsman Sports Centre, Edmonton; Referees: Bender, Damčevski
4 April 2012; 14:20	Report	Score by quarters: 0–5, 0–6, 2–4, 0–6			Kinsman Sports Centre, Edmonton; Referees: Bender, Damčevski
4 April 2012; 14:20	Report	Gagatay 2	Goals	Espanol 5	Kinsman Sports Centre, Edmonton; Referees: Bender, Damčevski

4 April 2012; 19:40	Report	Canada	13–5	Argentina	Kinsman Sports Centre, Edmonton; Referees: Vasileiou, Ađić
4 April 2012; 19:40	Report	Score by quarters: 5–1, 3–1, 3–2, 2–1			Kinsman Sports Centre, Edmonton; Referees: Vasileiou, Ađić
4 April 2012; 19:40	Report	Vikalo 3	Goals	Echenique 2	Kinsman Sports Centre, Edmonton; Referees: Vasileiou, Ađić

5 April 2012; 18:20	Report	Brazil	11–11	Turkey	Kinsman Sports Centre, Edmonton; Referees: Bender, Ađić
5 April 2012; 18:20	Report	Score by quarters: 5–2, 3–5, 1–2, 2–2			Kinsman Sports Centre, Edmonton; Referees: Bender, Ađić
5 April 2012; 18:20	Report	Crivella 3	Goals	Cagatay 3	Kinsman Sports Centre, Edmonton; Referees: Bender, Ađić

5 April 2012; 19:40	Report	Spain	9–6	Canada	Kinsman Sports Centre, Edmonton; Referees: Gomez, Alexandrescu
5 April 2012; 19:40	Report	Score by quarters: 2–2, 1–2, 3–0, 3–2			Kinsman Sports Centre, Edmonton; Referees: Gomez, Alexandrescu
5 April 2012; 19:40	Report	Molina 3	Goals	Constantin-Bicari, Conway 2	Kinsman Sports Centre, Edmonton; Referees: Gomez, Alexandrescu

== Knockout stage ==
All times are local (UTC−6)

Bracket

Quarterfinals
A1	Montenegro	19
B4	Turkey	6
A3	Greece	10
B2	Canada	6
A2	Romania	19
B3	Brazil	8
A4	North Macedonia	7
B1	Spain	11

Semifinals
A1	Montenegro	13
A3	Greece	12
A2	Romania	6
B1	Spain	11

Gold medal game
A1	Montenegro	12
B1	Spain	9
Bronze medal game
A3	Greece	14
A2	Romania	10

5th-8th place bracket

5th-8th semifinals
B4	Turkey	7
B2	Canada	12
B3	Brazil	12
A4	North Macedonia	15

5th place
B2	Canada	11
A4	North Macedonia	10
7th place
B4	Turkey	16
B3	Brazil	12

=== Quarterfinal round ===
The winners in the quarterfinal round qualify for the 2012 Olympic Games water polo tournament.

6 April 2012; 14:00	Report	Montenegro	19–6	Turkey	Kinsman Sports Centre, Edmonton; Referees: Terpenka, Alexandrescu
6 April 2012; 14:00	Report	Score by quarters: 4–1, 4–1, 7–3, 4–1			Kinsman Sports Centre, Edmonton; Referees: Terpenka, Alexandrescu
6 April 2012; 14:00	Report	Ivović 5	Goals	Cagatay, Beskardesler 2	Kinsman Sports Centre, Edmonton; Referees: Terpenka, Alexandrescu

6 April 2012; 15:30	Report	Romania	19–8	Brazil	Kinsman Sports Centre, Edmonton; Referees: Peris, Vasilieou
6 April 2012; 15:30	Report	Score by quarters: 4–0, 5–2, 6–1, 4–5			Kinsman Sports Centre, Edmonton; Referees: Peris, Vasilieou
6 April 2012; 15:30	Report	Negrean, Georgescu 4	Goals	Silva, Miranda 2	Kinsman Sports Centre, Edmonton; Referees: Peris, Vasilieou

6 April 2012; 17:00	Report	North Macedonia	7–11	Spain	Kinsman Sports Centre, Edmonton; Referees: Rotstart, Gomez
6 April 2012; 17:00	Report	Score by quarters: 3–2, 0–3, 1–3, 3–3			Kinsman Sports Centre, Edmonton; Referees: Rotstart, Gomez
6 April 2012; 17:00	Report	7 different scorers	Goals	Molina 5	Kinsman Sports Centre, Edmonton; Referees: Rotstart, Gomez

6 April 2012; 18:30	Report	Greece	10–6	Canada	Kinsman Sports Centre, Edmonton; Referees: Flahive, Borrell
6 April 2012; 18:30	Report	Score by quarters: 2–1, 2–1, 4–3, 0–0			Kinsman Sports Centre, Edmonton; Referees: Flahive, Borrell
6 April 2012; 18:30	Report	Theodoropoulos, Afroudakis 4	Goals	Constantin-Bicari, Graham 2	Kinsman Sports Centre, Edmonton; Referees: Flahive, Borrell

=== Semifinal round ===
==== 5th-8th classification semifinals ====
7 April 2012; 13:00	Report	Turkey	7–12	Canada	Kinsman Sports Centre, Edmonton; Referees: Damcevski, Smit
7 April 2012; 13:00	Report	Score by quarters: 3–4, 1–3, 2–1, 1–4			Kinsman Sports Centre, Edmonton; Referees: Damcevski, Smit
7 April 2012; 13:00	Report	Okman 2	Goals	Constantin-Bicari 2	Kinsman Sports Centre, Edmonton; Referees: Damcevski, Smit

7 April 2012; 14:20	Report	Brazil	12–15	North Macedonia	Kinsman Sports Centre, Edmonton; Referees: Filiksac, Adzic
7 April 2012; 14:20	Report	Score by quarters: 2–3, 2–4, 4–3, 4–5			Kinsman Sports Centre, Edmonton; Referees: Filiksac, Adzic
7 April 2012; 14:20	Report	Silva 4	Goals	six players 2	Kinsman Sports Centre, Edmonton; Referees: Filiksac, Adzic

==== 1st-4th classification semifinals ====
7 April 2012; 15:40	Report	Montenegro	13–12 (OT)	Greece	Kinsman Sports Centre, Edmonton; Referees: Terpenka, Gómez
7 April 2012; 15:40	Report	Score by quarters: 0–2, 5–5, 3–1, 2–2 OT: 3–2			Kinsman Sports Centre, Edmonton; Referees: Terpenka, Gómez
7 April 2012; 15:40	Report	Janović 5	Goals	Fountoulis 4	Kinsman Sports Centre, Edmonton; Referees: Terpenka, Gómez

7 April 2012; 17:00	Report	Romania	6–11	Spain	Kinsman Sports Centre, Edmonton; Referees: Bender, Rotstart
7 April 2012; 17:00	Report	Score by quarters: 1–3, 1–4, 3–3, 1–1			Kinsman Sports Centre, Edmonton; Referees: Bender, Rotstart
7 April 2012; 17:00	Report	Negrean 3	Goals	Perrone 3	Kinsman Sports Centre, Edmonton; Referees: Bender, Rotstart

=== Final round ===
==== 7th place match ====
8 April 2012; 13:00	Report	Turkey	16–12	Brazil	Kinsman Sports Centre, Edmonton; Referees: Vasileiou, Damčevski
8 April 2012; 13:00	Report	Score by quarters: 5–2, 3–4, 3–2, 5–4			Kinsman Sports Centre, Edmonton; Referees: Vasileiou, Damčevski
8 April 2012; 13:00	Report	three players 3	Goals	Rocha 3	Kinsman Sports Centre, Edmonton; Referees: Vasileiou, Damčevski

==== 5th place match ====
8 April 2012; 14:20	Report	Canada	11–10	North Macedonia	Kinsman Sports Centre, Edmonton; Referees: Alexandrescu, Werner
8 April 2012; 14:20	Report	Score by quarters: 4–0, 2–3, 2–3, 3–4			Kinsman Sports Centre, Edmonton; Referees: Alexandrescu, Werner
8 April 2012; 14:20	Report	four players 2	Goals	Randjikj 4	Kinsman Sports Centre, Edmonton; Referees: Alexandrescu, Werner

==== Bronze medal match ====
8 April 2012; 15:40	Report	Greece	14–10	Romania	Kinsman Sports Centre, Edmonton; Referees: Peris, Rotstart
8 April 2012; 15:40	Report	Score by quarters: 4–3, 6–3, 1–2, 3–2			Kinsman Sports Centre, Edmonton; Referees: Peris, Rotstart
8 April 2012; 15:40	Report	Miralis, Delakas 3	Goals	Radu 5	Kinsman Sports Centre, Edmonton; Referees: Peris, Rotstart

==== Final ====
8 April 2012; 17:00	Report	Montenegro	12–9	Spain	Kinsman Sports Centre, Edmonton; Referees: Flahive, Gomez
8 April 2012; 17:00	Report	Score by quarters: 3–2, 2–2, 4–2, 3–3			Kinsman Sports Centre, Edmonton; Referees: Flahive, Gomez
8 April 2012; 17:00	Report	Pasković, Janović 3	Goals	Perrone, García 3	Kinsman Sports Centre, Edmonton; Referees: Flahive, Gomez

== Final ranking ==
Rank	Team
1.	Montenegro
2.	Spain
3.	Greece
4.	Romania
5.	Canada
6.	North Macedonia
7.	Turkey
8.	Brazil
9.	Germany
10.	Argentina
11.	Netherlands

== See also ==
2012 Women's Water Polo Olympic Games Qualification Tournament
