= 2024 Pan American Water Polo Championship – Women's tournament =

Tournament details
- Host country: Colombia
- Venue: 1 (in 1 host city)
- Dates: 20–25 November
- Teams: 6

Final positions
- Champions: United States (2nd title)
- Runners-up: Argentina
- Third place: Brazil
- Fourth place: Colombia

Tournament statistics
- Matches played: 15
- Goals scored: 426 (28.4 per match)
- Top scorers: (Brazil) Letícia Belório (Argentina) Julieta Auliel (19 goals)

The 2024 Pan American Water Polo Championship – Women's tournament was the 9th edition of the continental championship, organised by the PanAm Aquatics. The event was held in Ibagué, Colombia. The top two in the championship qualified for the 2025 World Aquatics Championships. Canada are the defending champions, but didn't enter this time round.

United States won the championship after winning all their games.

== Teams ==
The following teams participated:

Teams
Argentina
Brazil
Colombia
Mexico
Venezuela
United States

== Venue ==
The venue is the Parque Deportivo in Ibagué, Colombia.

== Group standings ==
Pos	Team	Pld	W	PSW	PSL	L	GF	GA	GD	Pts	Qualification
1	United States	5	5	0	0	0	112	19	+93	15	Qualified for Final and 2025 World Aquatics Championships
2	Argentina	5	4	0	0	1	94	56	+38	12	Qualified for Final and 2025 World Aquatics Championships
3	Brazil	5	3	0	0	2	93	44	+49	9	Qualified for Third place match
4	Colombia	5	2	0	0	3	66	77	−11	6	Qualified for Third place match
5	Mexico	5	1	0	0	4	45	110	−65	3	Qualified for Fifth place match
6	Venezuela	5	0	0	0	5	16	120	−104	0	Qualified for Fifth place match

Source: Pan American Water Polo Championship

20 November 2024; 09:00	Report	Brazil	33–1	Venezuela	Parque Deportivo, Ibagué
20 November 2024; 09:00	Report	Score by quarters: 10–1, 7–0, 11–0, 5–0			Parque Deportivo, Ibagué
20 November 2024; 09:00	Report	Belório 6	Goals	Castillo 1	Parque Deportivo, Ibagué

20 November 2024; 10:30	Report	Argentina	9–20	United States	Parque Deportivo, Ibagué
20 November 2024; 10:30	Report	Score by quarters: 3–7, 3–5, 2–4, 1–4			Parque Deportivo, Ibagué
20 November 2024; 10:30	Report	Mastronardi 3	Goals	four players 3	Parque Deportivo, Ibagué

20 November 2024; 12:00	Report	Colombia	17–11	Mexico	Parque Deportivo, Ibagué
20 November 2024; 12:00	Report	Score by quarters: 4–5, 2–1, 4–2, 7–3			Parque Deportivo, Ibagué
20 November 2024; 12:00	Report	Maldonado 4	Goals	Restrepo 4	Parque Deportivo, Ibagué

21 November 2024; 13:00	Report	Argentina	14–12	Brazil	Parque Deportivo, Ibagué
21 November 2024; 13:00	Report	Score by quarters: 1–4, 4–4, 4–3, 5–1			Parque Deportivo, Ibagué
21 November 2024; 13:00	Report	Auliel 4	Goals	Belório 4	Parque Deportivo, Ibagué

21 November 2024; 14:30	Report	Mexico	3–27	United States	Parque Deportivo, Ibagué
21 November 2024; 14:30	Report	Score by quarters: 1–7, 1–9, 1–7, 0–4			Parque Deportivo, Ibagué
21 November 2024; 14:30	Report	three players 1	Goals	Ausmus 5	Parque Deportivo, Ibagué

21 November 2024; 16:00	Report	Colombia	26–5	Venezuela	Parque Deportivo, Ibagué
21 November 2024; 16:00	Report	Score by quarters: 9–2, 8–1, 5–2, 4–0			Parque Deportivo, Ibagué
21 November 2024; 16:00	Report	five players 3	Goals	Escobar 2	Parque Deportivo, Ibagué

22 November 2024; 09:00	Report	Venezuela	2–20	Argentina	Parque Deportivo, Ibagué
22 November 2024; 09:00	Report	Score by quarters: 1–2, 0–8, 0–5, 1–5			Parque Deportivo, Ibagué
22 November 2024; 09:00	Report	Hernandez, Gil 1	Goals	Canda 4	Parque Deportivo, Ibagué

22 November 2024; 10:30	Report	Brazil	25–4	Mexico	Parque Deportivo, Ibagué
22 November 2024; 10:30	Report	Score by quarters: 8–1, 6–1, 6–1, 5–1			Parque Deportivo, Ibagué
22 November 2024; 10:30	Report	Belório 4	Goals	Gonzalez 2	Parque Deportivo, Ibagué

22 November 2024; 12:00	Report	United States	24–3	Colombia	Parque Deportivo, Ibagué
22 November 2024; 12:00	Report	Score by quarters: 7–0, 7–1, 5–1, 5–1			Parque Deportivo, Ibagué
22 November 2024; 12:00	Report	Bonaguidi, Prentice 4	Goals	Vanegas 3	Parque Deportivo, Ibagué

23 November 2024; 09:00	Report	United States	18–3	Brazil	Parque Deportivo, Ibagué
23 November 2024; 09:00	Report	Score by quarters: 3–0, 6–0, 5–1, 4–2			Parque Deportivo, Ibagué
23 November 2024; 09:00	Report	Gazzaniga, Lineback 3	Goals	Alba 2	Parque Deportivo, Ibagué

23 November 2024; 10:30	Report	Venezuela	7–18	Mexico	Parque Deportivo, Ibagué
23 November 2024; 10:30	Report	Score by quarters: 0–5, 2–4, 2–3, 3–6			Parque Deportivo, Ibagué
23 November 2024; 10:30	Report	Hernandez 3	Goals	Godinez 6	Parque Deportivo, Ibagué

23 November 2024; 12:00	Report	Argentina	17–13	Colombia	Parque Deportivo, Ibagué
23 November 2024; 12:00	Report	Score by quarters: 5–3, 5–4, 4–3, 3–3			Parque Deportivo, Ibagué
23 November 2024; 12:00	Report	Bacigalupo 5	Goals	Serna Quiroz 7	Parque Deportivo, Ibagué

24 November 2024; 09:00	Report	United States	23–1	Venezuela	Parque Deportivo, Ibagué
24 November 2024; 09:00	Report	Score by quarters: 8–0, 5–0, 4–1, 6–0			Parque Deportivo, Ibagué
24 November 2024; 09:00	Report	Pearson 4	Goals	Hernandez 1	Parque Deportivo, Ibagué

24 November 2024; 10:30	Report	Mexico	9–34	Argentina	Parque Deportivo, Ibagué
24 November 2024; 10:30	Report	Score by quarters: 3–7, 2–8, 3–7, 1–12			Parque Deportivo, Ibagué
24 November 2024; 10:30	Report	three players 2	Goals	Perasso 9	Parque Deportivo, Ibagué

24 November 2024; 12:00	Report	Colombia	7–20	Brazil	Parque Deportivo, Ibagué
24 November 2024; 12:00	Report	Score by quarters: 1–4, 2–4, 1–7, 3–5			Parque Deportivo, Ibagué
24 November 2024; 12:00	Report	Ciro 2	Goals	three players 4	Parque Deportivo, Ibagué

== Knockout stage ==
=== Fifth place match ===
Fifth place match
Mexico	10
Venezuela	12

24 November 2024; 20:30	Report	Mexico	10–12	Venezuela	Parque Deportivo, Ibagué
24 November 2024; 20:30	Report	Score by quarters: 3–1, 4–3, 2–4, 1–4			Parque Deportivo, Ibagué
24 November 2024; 20:30	Report	Fanay, Ruvalcaba 4	Goals	Hernandez 8	Parque Deportivo, Ibagué

=== Third place match ===
Third place match
Brazil	11
Colombia	7

25 November 2024; 10:30	Report	Colombia	7–11	Brazil	Parque Deportivo, Ibagué
25 November 2024; 10:30	Report	Score by quarters: 1–2, 1–4, 3–3, 2–2			Parque Deportivo, Ibagué
25 November 2024; 10:30	Report	Serna Quiroz 5	Goals	Leão 3	Parque Deportivo, Ibagué

=== Final ===
Final
United States	18
Argentina	5

25 November 2024; 12:00	Report	Argentina	5–18	United States	Parque Deportivo, Ibagué
25 November 2024; 12:00	Report	Score by quarters: 1–6, 1–7, 2–2, 1–3			Parque Deportivo, Ibagué
25 November 2024; 12:00	Report	Auliel 3	Goals	three players 3	Parque Deportivo, Ibagué

== Final rankings ==
Rank	Team
Gold medal	United States
Silver medal	Argentina
Bronze medal	Brazil
4	Colombia
5	Venezuela
6	Mexico

Team Qualified for the Water polo at the 2025 World Aquatics Championships – Women's tournament
