= Mexico men's national water polo team =

Men's national water polo team representing Mexico

Mexico
- FINA code: MEX
- Confederation: UANA (Americas)
- Head coach: Ares Ponce

Olympic Games
- Appearances: 4 (first in 1952)
- Best result: 10th place (1976)

World Championship
- Appearances: 3 (first in 1973)
- Best result: 9th place (1973, 1975)

World League
- Appearances: 1 (first in 2007)
- Best result: Preliminary round (2007)

The Mexico men's national water polo team represents Mexico in international men's water polo competitions and friendly matches.

== Results ==
=== Olympic Games ===
- 1952 — 18th place
- 1968 — 11th place
- 1972 — 13th place
- 1976 — 10th place

=== World Championship ===
- 1973 — 9th place
- 1975 — 9th place
- 1978 — 15th place

=== FINA World Cup ===
- No participation

=== FINA World League ===
- 2007 — Preliminary round

=== Pan American Games ===
- 1951 — unknown
- 1955 — unknown
- 1959 — unknown
- 1963 — 5th place
- 1967 — 3rd place
- 1971 — 3rd place
- 1975 — 1st place
- 1979 — 4th place
- 1983 — unknown
- 1987 — unknown
- 1991 — unknown
- 1995 — unknown
- 1999 — 8th place
- 2003 — 5th place
- 2007 — 7th place
- 2011 — 6th place
- 2015 — 5th place
- 2019 — 7th place
- 2023 — 6th place

=== Central American and Caribbean Games ===
- 1946 — 3rd place
- 1950 — 1st place
- 1954 — 1st place
- 1959 — 1st place
- 1962 — 1st place
- 1966 — 2nd place
- 1970 — 2nd place
- 1974 — 2nd place
- 1978 — 2nd place
- 1982 — 2nd place
- 1986 — 2nd place
- 1990 — 2nd place
- 1993 — 2nd place
- 1998 — 3rd place
- 2002 — 1st place
- 2006 — 3rd place
- 2010 — 3rd place
- 2014 — 1st place
- 2018 — 4th place
- 2023 — 3rd place

== Squads ==
- 2006 Central American and Caribbean Games — Bronze Medal

- Maximiliano Aguilar, Oliver Alvarez, Diego Castañeda, Armando García, Omar Gutierrez (c), Cutberto Hernandez, Hermes Ponce, Rainer Schmidt, Richard Schmidt, Jorge Lopez Chavez, Romel Palacios, Carlos Villegas, and Fausto Vazquez. Head Coach: Raúl de la Peña.

- 2007 Pan American Games — 7th place

- Omar Gutierrez (c), Jorge Perez Romero, Cutberto Hernandez, Rainer Schmidt, Erik Palácios, Jorge Lopez Chavez, Oliver Alvarez, Richard Schmidt, Diego Castañeda, Armando García, Fausto Vazquez, Julian Gonzalez, and Orlando Ortega. Head Coach: Raúl de la Peña.

- 2008 Olympic Qualifying Tournament — 11th place

- Orlando Ortega, Diego Castañeda, Rainer Schmidt, Jorge Lopez Chavez, Daniel Vazquez, Maximiliano Aguilar, Oliver Alvarez, Fausto Vazquez, Armando García, Richard Schmidt, Gonzalo Mejia, Jorge Perez Romero, and Andres Oñeto. Head Coach: Raúl de la Peña.

- 1962 Central American and Caribbean Games — Gold Medal

- Oscar Familiar, Luis Guzman, Alfonso Barra Y Rivera "Fraile", Manuel Quejeiro, Head Coach: Ramón G. Velazquez.

== Notable players ==
- Armando Fernández, 223 caps for Mexico (1971-1978)

== See also ==
- Mexico women's national water polo team
