= RUM Natatorium =

Swimming complex on the University of Puerto Rico Mayagüez Campus

Natatorio Carlos Berrocal
- Piscina Alumni; Natatorio Centroamericano; Piscina del Colegio
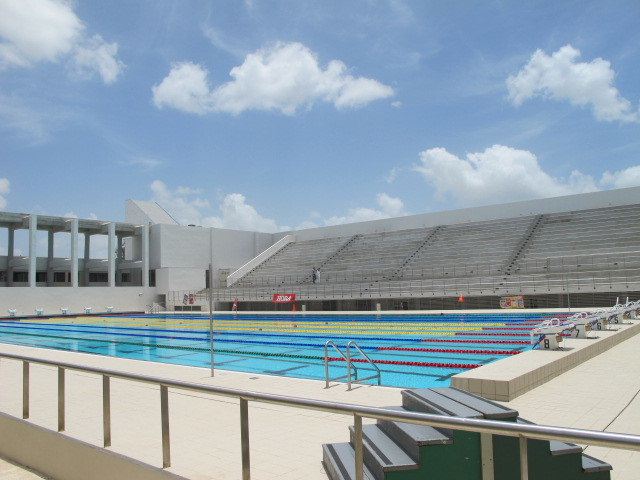
- Main Pool
- Interactive map of Natatorio Carlos Berrocal
- Full name: Recinto Universitario de Mayagüez Natatorium
- Address: Miradero, Mayagüez, PR
- Coordinates: 18°12′59.01″N 67°08′36.76″W
- Capacity: 3,240

Construction
- Built: 2010
- Opened: 2010

Tenants
- Tarzanes; Janes

The RUM Natatorium or Natatorio is a swimming complex on the University of Puerto Rico, Mayagüez Campus. The facility has three pools, the first is a 50-meter "Olympic" pool, a 25x25 meter warm up pool, and a diving pool which measures 25x35 meters that has dive platforms structures.

== History ==
The original Colegio pool Piscina Alumni (the "Alumni Pool") was located in the same site; it was demolished to make way for the new one. It was named for CAAM Alumni who provided funding for its construction. The Piscina Alumni was designed by Henry Klumb and it was inaugurated in 1966.

The new complex was designed by the local firm, Fuster + Partners – Architects. The new natatorium cost $34 million, which was paid by the "Autoridad para el Financiamiento de Infraestructura (AFI)". The pool was used for swimming, diving, synchronized swimming, and water polo at the 2010 Central American and Caribbean Games, and have passed on to the University. This pool served as the main venue for the 2011 CCCAN. In 2019 a gymnasium was inaugurated inside the complex.

After an earthquake in early 2020 the building suffered damage to one of the walls near the swimming pools resulting in the area being sealed off.

== Gallery ==
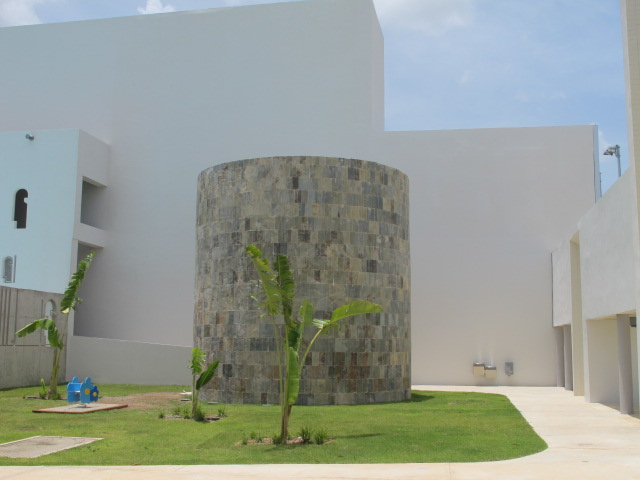
A view of the jacuzzi

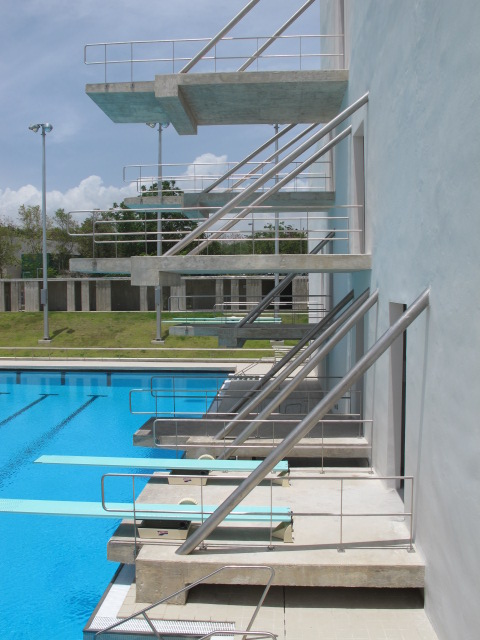
View of the diving platforms.

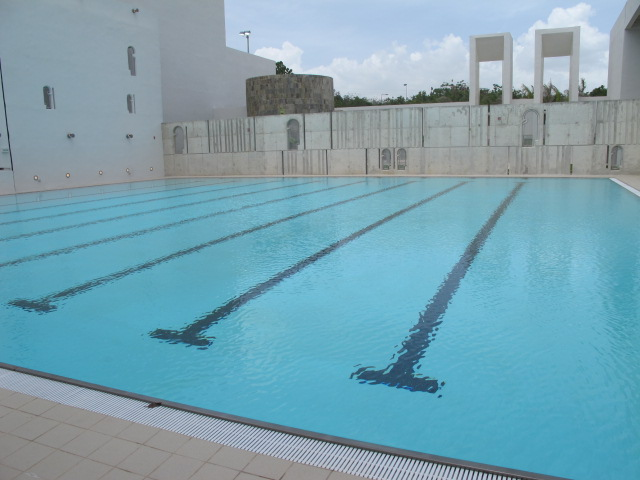
Warmup Pool

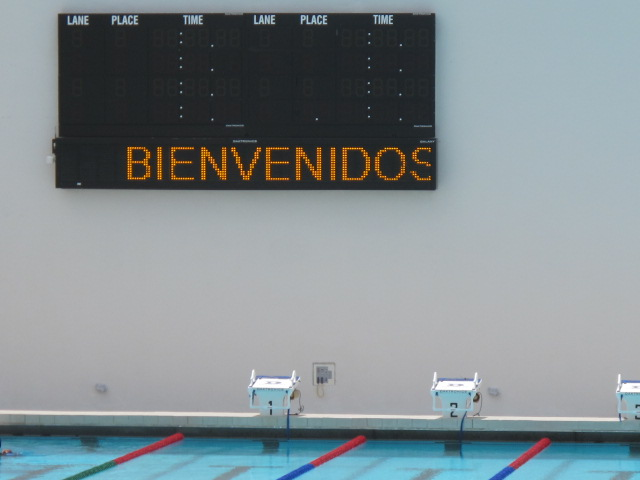
Scoreboard
