= Water polo at the 2025 World Aquatics Championships – Women's tournament =

Tournament details
- Host country: Singapore
- Venue: 1 (in 1 host city)
- Dates: 11–23 July
- Teams: 16 (from 5 confederations)

Final positions
- Champions: Greece (2nd title)
- Runners-up: Hungary
- Third place: Spain
- Fourth place: United States

Tournament statistics
- Matches played: 48
- Goals scored: 1,286 (26.79 per match)
- Top scorers: (Greece) Foteini Tricha (25 goals)

Awards
- Best player: (Hungary) Rita Keszthelyi
- Best goalkeeper: (Greece) Ioanna Stamatopoulou

The women's water polo tournament at the 2025 World Aquatics Championships was held from 11 to 23 July 2025. This was the 18th time that the women's water polo tournament has been played since the first edition in 1986. United States are the defending champions, having beaten Hungary in Doha 2024.

Greece won their second title by defeating Hungary in the final.

== Qualification ==
Map of qualifiers for the 2025 World Aquatics Championships: Team qualified for 2025 World Aquatics Championships Team failed to qualify Team banned from competition Did not enter

Qualification took place between January 2024 and April 2025, with a mix of international competitions organised by World Aquatics and continental championships held by the regional bodies acting as qualification. Overall, 35 countries took part in qualification. The slot allocation was as follows:

- Host nation: 1 slot
- 2024 Summer Olympics: 3 slots
- 2025 World Cup: 3 slots
- 2025 Asian Championship: 3 slots
- 2024 Pan American Championship: 2 slots
- 2024 European Championship: 3 slots
- African selection: 1 slot
- Oceanian selection: 1 slot

Of the 16 countries that qualified, 13 took part in 2024. Croatia will make their debut at the championship, while Argentina and Japan returns after a one edition absence. Regarding the non qualifiers, Kazakhstan failed to qualify, marking Kazakhstan's first non-qualification since 2005. Having taken part in 2024, Brazil failed to qualify. Surprisingly, 2024 Olympics participants, Canada, didn't enter the 2024 Pan American Championship and thus failed to qualify for the first time ever.

The highest ranked team that failed to qualify was Canada, ranked 8th, while hosts Singapore are the lowest ranked team participating, ranked 22nd.

Event	Dates	Hosts	Quota	Qualifier(s)
Host nation	—N/a	—N/a	1	Singapore
2024 Summer Olympics	27 July – 10 August 2024	(France) Paris	3	Spain; Australia; Netherlands
2025 World Cup	14 December 2024 – 20 April 2025	(China) Chengdu	3	Greece; Hungary; Italy
2025 Asian Championship	25 February – 2 March 2025	(China) Zhaoqing	2	China; Japan
2024 Pan American Championship	20–25 November 2024	(Colombia) Ibagué	2	Argentina; United States
2024 European Championship	5–13 January 2024	(Netherlands) Eindhoven	3	Croatia; France; Great Britain
African selection	—N/a	—N/a	1	South Africa
Oceanian selection	—N/a	—N/a	1	New Zealand
Total			16	

=== Summary of qualified teams ===
Team	Qualification method	Date of qualification	Appearance(s)				Previous best performance (Note: Bold text indicates they hosted that edition.)	WR
Team	Qualification method	Date of qualification	Total	First	Last	Streak	Previous best performance	WR
Singapore	Host nation	9 February 2023	2nd	2024		2	Sixteenth place (2024)	22
Australia	2024 Summer Olympics	8 August 2024	18th	1986	2024	18	Champions (1986)	6
Spain	2024 Summer Olympics	8 August 2024	14th	1998	2024	13	Champions (2013)	1
Netherlands	2024 Summer Olympics	10 August 2024	18th	1986	2024	18	Champions (1991, 2023)	2
Argentina	2024 Pan American Championship	23 November 2024	3rd	2022	2023	1	Twelfth place (2022)	21
United States	2024 Pan American Championship	23 November 2024	18th	1986	2024	18	Champions (Eight times) (Note: United States have won in 2003, 2007, 2009, 2015, 2017, 2019, 2022 and 2024.)	3
China	2025 Asian Championship	1 March 2025	11th	2005	2024	3	Runners-up (2011)	9
Japan	2025 Asian Championship	1 March 2025	7th	2001	2023	1	Eleventh place (2001, 2003)	14
Greece	2025 World Cup	18 April 2025	15th	1998	2024	15	Champions (2011)	5
Hungary	2025 World Cup	18 April 2025	18th	1986	2024	18	Champions (1994, 2005)	4
Italy	2025 World Cup	18 April 2025	16th	1994	2024	16	Champions (1998, 2001)	7
Croatia	2024 European Championship (Note: Due to time constraints, no European qualification took place so the results from the 2024 European Championship were used to decide the three teams who qualified from Europe.)	18 April 2025	1st	Debut				16
France	2024 European Championship	18 April 2025	9th	1991	2024	4	Eighth place (2022)	10
Great Britain	2024 European Championship	18 April 2025	5th	1986	2024	2	Ninth place (1986)	11
New Zealand	Oceanian Selection	6 May 2025	16th	1991	2024	12	Seventh place (1991)	15
South Africa	African selection	6 May 2025	10th	2009	2024	10	Twelfth place (2023)	19

== Final draw ==
The Final draw was held at 17:00 CET on 7 May 2025 at the World Aquatics' interim headquarters in Budapest, Hungary. The draw was hosted by sports presenter Edit Szalay. Water polo players, Laura Ester and Filip Filipović, alongside World Aquatics President Husain Al-Musallam and Singaporean Olympian Mark Chay, were the guests who assisted with the draw. The draw started with, in order, pots 4, 3, 2 and 1 being drawn, with each team selected then allocated into the first available group alphabetically. The position for the team within the group would then be drawn (for the purpose of the schedule). There were no draw restrictions.

=== Seeding ===
The seeding was announced on 6 May 2025, a day before the draw.

Pot 1	Pot 2	Pot 3	Pot 4
Spain; Australia; Netherlands; Greece	Hungary; Italy; France; United States	Great Britain; Croatia; New Zealand; Argentina	Japan; China; South Africa; Singapore

=== Draw ===
Group A
Pos	Team
A1	Australia
A2	Italy
A3	Singapore
A4	New Zealand

Group B
Pos	Team
B1	China
B2	Argentina
B3	United States
B4	Netherlands

Group C
Pos	Team
C1	Croatia
C2	Greece
C3	Japan
C4	Hungary

Group D
Pos	Team
D1	Great Britain
D2	South Africa
D3	France
D4	Spain

== Referees ==
On 26 April 2025, the following referees were announced as officiating the championship.

Region	Country	Referees
Africa	Egypt	Yasser Mehalhel
Africa	South Africa	Dasch Barber
Americas	Argentina	Germán Moller
Americas	Brazil	Marcella Braga
Americas	Canada	Evan Andrews
Americas	United States	Jennifer McCall
Americas	United States	Scott Voltz
Asia	China	Zhang Liang
Asia	Japan	Chisato Kurosaki

Region	Country	Referees
Asia	Singapore	Wu Zhekang
Europe	Croatia	Andrej Franulović
Europe	France	Aurély Blanchard
Europe	Germany	Frank Ohme
Europe	Great Britain	Maxim Gerasimov
Europe	Greece	Georgios Stavridis
Europe	Hungary	Tamás Kovács-Csatlós
Europe	Italy	Alessia Ferrari
Europe	Montenegro	Stanko Ivanovski

Region	Country	Referees
Europe	Netherlands	Michiel Zwart
Europe	Romania	Mihai Balanescu
Europe	Serbia	Ivan Raković
Europe	Slovenia	Boris Margeta
Europe	Spain	David Gómez
Europe	Spain	Marta Cabanas
Oceania	Australia	Fiona Haigh
Oceania	Australia	Nicholas Hodgers
Oceania	New Zealand	Megan Perry

== Preliminary round ==
The schedule was announced on 26 May 2025.

All times are local (UTC+8).

=== Group A ===
Pos	Team	Pld	W	PSW	PSL	L	GF	GA	GD	Pts	Qualification
1	Australia	3	3	0	0	0	68	23	+45	9	Quarterfinals
2	Italy	3	2	0	0	1	61	33	+28	6	Playoffs
3	New Zealand	3	1	0	0	2	37	36	+1	3	Playoffs
4	Singapore (H)	3	0	0	0	3	14	88	−74	0	13–16th place semifinals

Source: Omegatiming
Rules for classification: 1) points; 2) head-to-head points; 3) head-to-head goal difference; 4) head-to-head number of goals scored; 5) Goal difference.
(H) Host

11 July 2025; 17:35	Report	Italy	14–9	New Zealand	OCBC Aquatic Centre, Singapore; Referees: Aurély Blanchard (FRA), Tamás Kovács-Csatlós (HUN)
11 July 2025; 17:35	Report	Score by quarters: 1–2, 3–4, 5–2, 5–1			OCBC Aquatic Centre, Singapore; Referees: Aurély Blanchard (FRA), Tamás Kovács-Csatlós (HUN)
11 July 2025; 17:35	Report	three players 3	Goals	Weston 2	OCBC Aquatic Centre, Singapore; Referees: Aurély Blanchard (FRA), Tamás Kovács-Csatlós (HUN)

11 July 2025; 19:10	Report	Singapore	2–34	Australia	OCBC Aquatic Centre, Singapore; Referees: Marcella Braga (BRA), Boris Margeta (SLO)
11 July 2025; 19:10	Report	Score by quarters: 0–7, 1–8, 1–10, 0–9			OCBC Aquatic Centre, Singapore; Referees: Marcella Braga (BRA), Boris Margeta (SLO)
11 July 2025; 19:10	Report	Lee, Ong C. 1	Goals	Williams 5	OCBC Aquatic Centre, Singapore; Referees: Marcella Braga (BRA), Boris Margeta (SLO)

13 July 2025; 17:35	Report	Australia	19–15	Italy	OCBC Aquatic Centre, Singapore; Referees: David Gómez (ESP), Frank Ohme (GER)
13 July 2025; 17:35	Report	Score by quarters: 4–3, 4–2, 6–4, 5–6			OCBC Aquatic Centre, Singapore; Referees: David Gómez (ESP), Frank Ohme (GER)
13 July 2025; 17:35	Report	A. Andrews 5	Goals	Ranalli 6	OCBC Aquatic Centre, Singapore; Referees: David Gómez (ESP), Frank Ohme (GER)

13 July 2025; 19:10	Report	New Zealand	22–7	Singapore	OCBC Aquatic Centre, Singapore; Referees: Maxim Gerasimov (GBR), Evan Andrews (CAN)
13 July 2025; 19:10	Report	Score by quarters: 8–2, 5–1, 3–2, 6–2			OCBC Aquatic Centre, Singapore; Referees: Maxim Gerasimov (GBR), Evan Andrews (CAN)
13 July 2025; 19:10	Report	McDowall 8	Goals	Tio 4	OCBC Aquatic Centre, Singapore; Referees: Maxim Gerasimov (GBR), Evan Andrews (CAN)

15 July 2025; 17:35	Report	Australia	15–6	New Zealand	OCBC Aquatic Centre, Singapore; Referees: Tamás Kovács-Csatlós (HUN), Marta Cabanas (ESP)
15 July 2025; 17:35	Report	Score by quarters: 4–0, 3–2, 5–1, 3–3			OCBC Aquatic Centre, Singapore; Referees: Tamás Kovács-Csatlós (HUN), Marta Cabanas (ESP)
15 July 2025; 17:35	Report	three players 3	Goals	Houghton 3	OCBC Aquatic Centre, Singapore; Referees: Tamás Kovács-Csatlós (HUN), Marta Cabanas (ESP)

15 July 2025; 19:10	Report	Italy	32–5	Singapore	OCBC Aquatic Centre, Singapore; Referees: Chisato Kurosaki (JPN), Maxim Gerasimov (GBR)
15 July 2025; 19:10	Report	Score by quarters: 8–0, 8–1, 6–1, 10–3			OCBC Aquatic Centre, Singapore; Referees: Chisato Kurosaki (JPN), Maxim Gerasimov (GBR)
15 July 2025; 19:10	Report	Cocchiere 6	Goals	Lee 2	OCBC Aquatic Centre, Singapore; Referees: Chisato Kurosaki (JPN), Maxim Gerasimov (GBR)

=== Group B ===
Pos	Team	Pld	W	PSW	PSL	L	GF	GA	GD	Pts	Qualification
1	United States	3	3	0	0	0	52	19	+33	9	Quarterfinals
2	Netherlands	3	2	0	0	1	47	24	+23	6	Playoffs
3	China	3	1	0	0	2	43	37	+6	3	Playoffs
4	Argentina	3	0	0	0	3	18	80	−62	0	13–16th place semifinals

Source: Omegatiming
Rules for classification: 1) points; 2) head-to-head points; 3) head-to-head goal difference; 4) head-to-head number of goals scored; 5) Goal difference.

11 July 2025; 10:35	Report	Argentina	6–25	Netherlands	OCBC Aquatic Centre, Singapore; Referees: Maxim Gerasimov (GBR), Georgios Stavridis (GRE)
11 July 2025; 10:35	Report	Score by quarters: 1–6, 2–6, 2–7, 1–6			OCBC Aquatic Centre, Singapore; Referees: Maxim Gerasimov (GBR), Georgios Stavridis (GRE)
11 July 2025; 10:35	Report	Canda, Mastronardi 2	Goals	four players 3	OCBC Aquatic Centre, Singapore; Referees: Maxim Gerasimov (GBR), Georgios Stavridis (GRE)

11 July 2025; 12:10	Report	United States	15–7	China	OCBC Aquatic Centre, Singapore; Referees: Marta Cabanas (ESP), Chisato Kurosaki (JPN)
11 July 2025; 12:10	Report	Score by quarters: 3–1, 4–3, 6–1, 2–2			OCBC Aquatic Centre, Singapore; Referees: Marta Cabanas (ESP), Chisato Kurosaki (JPN)
11 July 2025; 12:10	Report	Ausmus, Lineback 3	Goals	Wang H. 2	OCBC Aquatic Centre, Singapore; Referees: Marta Cabanas (ESP), Chisato Kurosaki (JPN)

13 July 2025; 09:00	Report	China	29–9	Argentina	OCBC Aquatic Centre, Singapore; Referees: Marcella Braga (BRA), Andrej Franulović (CRO)
13 July 2025; 09:00	Report	Score by quarters: 9–4, 6–1, 6–1, 8–3			OCBC Aquatic Centre, Singapore; Referees: Marcella Braga (BRA), Andrej Franulović (CRO)
13 July 2025; 09:00	Report	three players 4	Goals	three players 2	OCBC Aquatic Centre, Singapore; Referees: Marcella Braga (BRA), Andrej Franulović (CRO)

13 July 2025; 20:45	Report	Netherlands	9–11	United States	OCBC Aquatic Centre, Singapore; Referees: Aurély Blanchard (FRA), Boris Margeta (SLO)
13 July 2025; 20:45	Report	Score by quarters: 2–3, 3–4, 1–2, 3–2			OCBC Aquatic Centre, Singapore; Referees: Aurély Blanchard (FRA), Boris Margeta (SLO)
13 July 2025; 20:45	Report	L. Rogge 3	Goals	Ausmus 3	OCBC Aquatic Centre, Singapore; Referees: Aurély Blanchard (FRA), Boris Margeta (SLO)

15 July 2025; 09:00	Report	Argentina	3–26	United States	OCBC Aquatic Centre, Singapore; Referees: Dasch Barber (RSA), Stanko Ivanovski (MNE)
15 July 2025; 09:00	Report	Score by quarters: 1–6, 1–7, 1–8, 0–5			OCBC Aquatic Centre, Singapore; Referees: Dasch Barber (RSA), Stanko Ivanovski (MNE)
15 July 2025; 09:00	Report	three players 1	Goals	Stryker 6	OCBC Aquatic Centre, Singapore; Referees: Dasch Barber (RSA), Stanko Ivanovski (MNE)

15 July 2025; 16:00	Report	China	7–13	Netherlands	OCBC Aquatic Centre, Singapore; Referees: Andrej Franulović (CRO), Yasser Mehalhel (EGY)
15 July 2025; 16:00	Report	Score by quarters: 2–3, 1–2, 2–4, 2–4			OCBC Aquatic Centre, Singapore; Referees: Andrej Franulović (CRO), Yasser Mehalhel (EGY)
15 July 2025; 16:00	Report	Yan S. 3	Goals	Van der Sloot 4	OCBC Aquatic Centre, Singapore; Referees: Andrej Franulović (CRO), Yasser Mehalhel (EGY)

=== Group C ===
Pos	Team	Pld	W	PSW	PSL	L	GF	GA	GD	Pts	Qualification
1	Hungary	3	3	0	0	0	65	28	+37	9	Quarterfinals
2	Greece	3	2	0	0	1	65	32	+33	6	Playoffs
3	Japan	3	1	0	0	2	53	70	−17	3	Playoffs
4	Croatia	3	0	0	0	3	25	78	−53	0	13–16th place semifinals

Source: Omegatiming
Rules for classification: 1) points; 2) head-to-head points; 3) head-to-head goal difference; 4) head-to-head number of goals scored; 5) Goal difference.

11 July 2025; 16:00	Report	Japan	25–12	Croatia	OCBC Aquatic Centre, Singapore; Referees: Fiona Haigh (AUS), Zhang Liang (CHN)
11 July 2025; 16:00	Report	Score by quarters: 7–3, 4–3, 11–5, 3–1			OCBC Aquatic Centre, Singapore; Referees: Fiona Haigh (AUS), Zhang Liang (CHN)
11 July 2025; 16:00	Report	Arima 7	Goals	Rožić 4	OCBC Aquatic Centre, Singapore; Referees: Fiona Haigh (AUS), Zhang Liang (CHN)

11 July 2025; 20:45	Report	Greece	9–10	Hungary	OCBC Aquatic Centre, Singapore; Referees: Jennifer McCall (USA), Frank Ohme (GER)
11 July 2025; 20:45	Report	Score by quarters: 2–1, 3–3, 0–4, 4–2			OCBC Aquatic Centre, Singapore; Referees: Jennifer McCall (USA), Frank Ohme (GER)
11 July 2025; 20:45	Report	Tricha 6	Goals	Rybanska 3	OCBC Aquatic Centre, Singapore; Referees: Jennifer McCall (USA), Frank Ohme (GER)

13 July 2025; 10:35	Report	Hungary	33–13	Japan	OCBC Aquatic Centre, Singapore; Referees: Germán Moller (ARG), Megan Perry (NZL)
13 July 2025; 10:35	Report	Score by quarters: 8–3, 8–2, 9–3, 8–5			OCBC Aquatic Centre, Singapore; Referees: Germán Moller (ARG), Megan Perry (NZL)
13 July 2025; 10:35	Report	Rybanska, Vályi 6	Goals	Arima 4	OCBC Aquatic Centre, Singapore; Referees: Germán Moller (ARG), Megan Perry (NZL)

13 July 2025; 13:45	Report	Croatia	7–31	Greece	OCBC Aquatic Centre, Singapore; Referees: Alessia Ferrari (ITA), Ivan Raković (SRB)
13 July 2025; 13:45	Report	Score by quarters: 1–9, 4–7, 1–7, 1–8			OCBC Aquatic Centre, Singapore; Referees: Alessia Ferrari (ITA), Ivan Raković (SRB)
13 July 2025; 13:45	Report	Srhoj 3	Goals	Tricha 5	OCBC Aquatic Centre, Singapore; Referees: Alessia Ferrari (ITA), Ivan Raković (SRB)

15 July 2025; 10:35	Report	Greece	25–15	Japan	OCBC Aquatic Centre, Singapore; Referees: Wu Zhekang (SGP), Scott Voltz (USA)
15 July 2025; 10:35	Report	Score by quarters: 6–3, 6–3, 6–4, 7–5			OCBC Aquatic Centre, Singapore; Referees: Wu Zhekang (SGP), Scott Voltz (USA)
15 July 2025; 10:35	Report	Myriokefalitaki 7	Goals	Kawaguchi 5	OCBC Aquatic Centre, Singapore; Referees: Wu Zhekang (SGP), Scott Voltz (USA)

15 July 2025; 20:45	Report	Croatia	6–22	Hungary	OCBC Aquatic Centre, Singapore; Referees: Fiona Haigh (AUS), Frank Ohme (GER)
15 July 2025; 20:45	Report	Score by quarters: 2–9, 2–5, 1–5, 1–3			OCBC Aquatic Centre, Singapore; Referees: Fiona Haigh (AUS), Frank Ohme (GER)
15 July 2025; 20:45	Report	Rožić 4	Goals	Garda, Keszthelyi 4	OCBC Aquatic Centre, Singapore; Referees: Fiona Haigh (AUS), Frank Ohme (GER)

=== Group D ===
Pos	Team	Pld	W	PSW	PSL	L	GF	GA	GD	Pts	Qualification
1	Spain	3	3	0	0	0	62	17	+45	9	Quarterfinals
2	Great Britain	3	2	0	0	1	31	28	+3	6	Playoffs
3	France	3	1	0	0	2	28	41	−13	3	Playoffs
4	South Africa	3	0	0	0	3	13	48	−35	0	13–16th place semifinals

Source: Omegatiming
Rules for classification: 1) points; 2) head-to-head points; 3) head-to-head goal difference; 4) head-to-head number of goals scored; 5) Goal difference.

11 July 2025; 09:00	Report	South Africa	4–23	Spain	OCBC Aquatic Centre, Singapore; Referees: Wu Zhekang (SGP), Michiel Zwart (NED)
11 July 2025; 09:00	Report	Score by quarters: 1–9, 0–5, 2–4, 1–5			OCBC Aquatic Centre, Singapore; Referees: Wu Zhekang (SGP), Michiel Zwart (NED)
11 July 2025; 09:00	Report	four players 1	Goals	González 5	OCBC Aquatic Centre, Singapore; Referees: Wu Zhekang (SGP), Michiel Zwart (NED)

11 July 2025; 13:45	Report	France	9–12	Great Britain	OCBC Aquatic Centre, Singapore; Referees: Alessia Ferrari (ITA), Megan Rose Perry (NZL)
11 July 2025; 13:45	Report	Score by quarters: 4–3, 0–3, 2–5, 3–1			OCBC Aquatic Centre, Singapore; Referees: Alessia Ferrari (ITA), Megan Rose Perry (NZL)
11 July 2025; 13:45	Report	Vernoux 4	Goals	Brown, Turner 3	OCBC Aquatic Centre, Singapore; Referees: Alessia Ferrari (ITA), Megan Rose Perry (NZL)

13 July 2025; 12:10	Report	Great Britain	12–3	South Africa	OCBC Aquatic Centre, Singapore; Referees: Zhang Liang (CHN), Wu Zhekang (SGP)
13 July 2025; 12:10	Report	Score by quarters: 5–0, 2–2, 4–1, 1–0			OCBC Aquatic Centre, Singapore; Referees: Zhang Liang (CHN), Wu Zhekang (SGP)
13 July 2025; 12:10	Report	Turner 4	Goals	three players 1	OCBC Aquatic Centre, Singapore; Referees: Zhang Liang (CHN), Wu Zhekang (SGP)

13 July 2025; 16:00	Report	Spain	23–6	France	OCBC Aquatic Centre, Singapore; Referees: Jennifer McCall (USA), Fiona Haigh (AUS)
13 July 2025; 16:00	Report	Score by quarters: 6–3, 5–2, 6–0, 6–1			OCBC Aquatic Centre, Singapore; Referees: Jennifer McCall (USA), Fiona Haigh (AUS)
13 July 2025; 16:00	Report	Ruiz 4	Goals	Vernoux 2	OCBC Aquatic Centre, Singapore; Referees: Jennifer McCall (USA), Fiona Haigh (AUS)

15 July 2025; 12:10	Report	South Africa	6–13	France	OCBC Aquatic Centre, Singapore; Referees: Megan Perry (NZL), Mihai Balanescu (ROU)
15 July 2025; 12:10	Report	Score by quarters: 1–4, 2–3, 3–3, 0–3			OCBC Aquatic Centre, Singapore; Referees: Megan Perry (NZL), Mihai Balanescu (ROU)
15 July 2025; 12:10	Report	Banks 2	Goals	Hardy, Heurtaux 3	OCBC Aquatic Centre, Singapore; Referees: Megan Perry (NZL), Mihai Balanescu (ROU)

15 July 2025; 13:45	Report	Great Britain	7–16	Spain	OCBC Aquatic Centre, Singapore; Referees: Marcella Braga (BRA), Alessia Ferrari (ITA)
15 July 2025; 13:45	Report	Score by quarters: 0–4, 1–3, 5–3, 1–6			OCBC Aquatic Centre, Singapore; Referees: Marcella Braga (BRA), Alessia Ferrari (ITA)
15 July 2025; 13:45	Report	three players 3	Goals	Ruiz 3	OCBC Aquatic Centre, Singapore; Referees: Marcella Braga (BRA), Alessia Ferrari (ITA)

== Knockout stage ==
=== Bracket ===
Championship bracket

Playoffs
17 July
Greece	23
France	9
17 July
Japan	23
Great Britain	10
17 July
Italy	13
China	11
17 July
New Zealand	9
Netherlands	14

Quarter-finals
19 July
Australia	7
Greece	8
19 July
United States	26
Japan	8
19 July
Hungary	12
Italy	9
19 July
Spain (PSO)	11 (4)
Netherlands	11 (2)

Semi-finals
21 July
Greece	14
United States	10
21 July
Hungary	15
Spain	9

Final
23 July
Greece	12
Hungary	9
Third place
23 July
United States	12
Spain	13

5th place bracket

5th–8th place semifinals
21 July
Australia	21
Japan	17
21 July
Italy	13
Netherlands	16

Fifth place game
23 July
Australia	11
Netherlands	13
Seventh place game
23 July
Japan	15
Italy	20

9th place bracket

9th–12th place semifinals
19 July
China	18
France	6
19 July
New Zealand	20
Great Britain	12

Ninth place game
21 July
China	10
New Zealand	6
Eleventh place game
21 July
France	9
Great Britain	14

13th place bracket

13th–16th place semifinals
17 July
Singapore	9
Argentina	18
17 July
Croatia	16
South Africa	6

13th place game
19 July
Argentina	12 (2)
Croatia (PSO)	12 (4)
15th place game
19 July
Singapore	4
South Africa	8

=== Playoffs ===
17 July 2025; 16:00	Report	Italy	13–11	China	OCBC Aquatic Centre, Singapore; Referees: Jennifer McCall (USA), Marta Cabanas (ESP)
17 July 2025; 16:00	Report	Score by quarters: 2–0, 4–5, 5–4, 2–2			OCBC Aquatic Centre, Singapore; Referees: Jennifer McCall (USA), Marta Cabanas (ESP)
17 July 2025; 16:00	Report	Bettini, Bianconi 3	Goals	Wang S., Yan S. 2	OCBC Aquatic Centre, Singapore; Referees: Jennifer McCall (USA), Marta Cabanas (ESP)

17 July 2025; 17:35	Report	New Zealand	9–14	Netherlands	OCBC Aquatic Centre, Singapore; Referees: Wu Zhekang (SGP), Germán Moller (ARG)
17 July 2025; 17:35	Report	Score by quarters: 1–3, 2–5, 4–5, 2–1			OCBC Aquatic Centre, Singapore; Referees: Wu Zhekang (SGP), Germán Moller (ARG)
17 July 2025; 17:35	Report	Quin 3	Goals	Van de Kraats 5	OCBC Aquatic Centre, Singapore; Referees: Wu Zhekang (SGP), Germán Moller (ARG)

17 July 2025; 19:10	Report	Greece	23–9	France	OCBC Aquatic Centre, Singapore; Referees: Dasch Barber (RSA), Marcella Braga (BRA)
17 July 2025; 19:10	Report	Score by quarters: 4–4, 4–3, 8–0, 7–2			OCBC Aquatic Centre, Singapore; Referees: Dasch Barber (RSA), Marcella Braga (BRA)
17 July 2025; 19:10	Report	Tricha 5	Goals	Heurtaux 4	OCBC Aquatic Centre, Singapore; Referees: Dasch Barber (RSA), Marcella Braga (BRA)

17 July 2025; 20:45	Report	Japan	23–10	Great Britain	OCBC Aquatic Centre, Singapore; Referees: Aurély Blanchard (FRA), Fiona Haigh (AUS)
17 July 2025; 20:45	Report	Score by quarters: 6–2, 5–2, 5–1, 7–5			OCBC Aquatic Centre, Singapore; Referees: Aurély Blanchard (FRA), Fiona Haigh (AUS)
17 July 2025; 20:45	Report	Ura 4	Goals	five players 2	OCBC Aquatic Centre, Singapore; Referees: Aurély Blanchard (FRA), Fiona Haigh (AUS)

=== Quarterfinals ===
19 July 2025; 16:00	Report	Australia	7–8	Greece	OCBC Aquatic Centre, Singapore; Referees: Zhang Liang (CHN), Michiel Zwart (NED)
19 July 2025; 16:00	Report	Score by quarters: 1–1, 2–4, 2–1, 2–2			OCBC Aquatic Centre, Singapore; Referees: Zhang Liang (CHN), Michiel Zwart (NED)
19 July 2025; 16:00	Report	A. Andrews, C. Andrews 2	Goals	Plevritou, Santa 2	OCBC Aquatic Centre, Singapore; Referees: Zhang Liang (CHN), Michiel Zwart (NED)

19 July 2025; 17:35	Report	United States	26–8	Japan	OCBC Aquatic Centre, Singapore; Referees: Alessia Ferrari (ITA), Marta Cabanas (ESP)
19 July 2025; 17:35	Report	Score by quarters: 10–2, 6–1, 5–2, 5–3			OCBC Aquatic Centre, Singapore; Referees: Alessia Ferrari (ITA), Marta Cabanas (ESP)
19 July 2025; 17:35	Report	Pearson 5	Goals	Sunabe, Ura 2	OCBC Aquatic Centre, Singapore; Referees: Alessia Ferrari (ITA), Marta Cabanas (ESP)

19 July 2025; 19:10	Report	Hungary	12–9	Italy	OCBC Aquatic Centre, Singapore; Referees: Jennifer McCall (USA), Boris Margeta (SLO)
19 July 2025; 19:10	Report	Score by quarters: 3–3, 3–2, 4–2, 2–2			OCBC Aquatic Centre, Singapore; Referees: Jennifer McCall (USA), Boris Margeta (SLO)
19 July 2025; 19:10	Report	Keszthelyi 4	Goals	Ranalli 4	OCBC Aquatic Centre, Singapore; Referees: Jennifer McCall (USA), Boris Margeta (SLO)

19 July 2025; 20:45	Report	Spain	15–13 (PSO)	Netherlands	OCBC Aquatic Centre, Singapore; Referees: Frank Ohme (GER), Georgios Stavridis (GRE)
19 July 2025; 20:45	Report	Score by quarters: 3–1, 4–2, 3–5, 1–3 PSO: 4–2			OCBC Aquatic Centre, Singapore; Referees: Frank Ohme (GER), Georgios Stavridis (GRE)
19 July 2025; 20:45	Report	Ortiz 3	Goals	L. Rogge 6	OCBC Aquatic Centre, Singapore; Referees: Frank Ohme (GER), Georgios Stavridis (GRE)

=== 13–16th place semifinals ===
17 July 2025; 09:00	Report	Singapore	9–18	Argentina	OCBC Aquatic Centre, Singapore; Referees: Megan Perry (NZL), Michiel Zwart (NED)
17 July 2025; 09:00	Report	Score by quarters: 2–4, 1–6, 3–4, 3–4			OCBC Aquatic Centre, Singapore; Referees: Megan Perry (NZL), Michiel Zwart (NED)
17 July 2025; 09:00	Report	Koh 3	Goals	Canda 5	OCBC Aquatic Centre, Singapore; Referees: Megan Perry (NZL), Michiel Zwart (NED)

17 July 2025; 10:35	Report	Croatia	16–6	South Africa	OCBC Aquatic Centre, Singapore; Referees: Alessia Ferrari (ITA), Maxim Gerasimov (GBR)
17 July 2025; 10:35	Report	Score by quarters: 7–2, 2–3, 2–0, 5–1			OCBC Aquatic Centre, Singapore; Referees: Alessia Ferrari (ITA), Maxim Gerasimov (GBR)
17 July 2025; 10:35	Report	Janković 4	Goals	Meecham 2	OCBC Aquatic Centre, Singapore; Referees: Alessia Ferrari (ITA), Maxim Gerasimov (GBR)

=== 9–12th place semifinals ===
19 July 2025; 12:10	Report	China	18–6	France	OCBC Aquatic Centre, Singapore; Referees: Fiona Haigh (AUS), Germán Moller (ARG)
19 July 2025; 12:10	Report	Score by quarters: 2–2, 4–0, 7–2, 5–2			OCBC Aquatic Centre, Singapore; Referees: Fiona Haigh (AUS), Germán Moller (ARG)
19 July 2025; 12:10	Report	Yan S. 4	Goals	Vernoux 3	OCBC Aquatic Centre, Singapore; Referees: Fiona Haigh (AUS), Germán Moller (ARG)

19 July 2025; 13:45	Report	New Zealand	20–12	Great Britain	OCBC Aquatic Centre, Singapore; Referees: Tamás Kovács-Csatlós (HUN), Marcella Braga (BRA)
19 July 2025; 13:45	Report	Score by quarters: 5–3, 7–3, 5–1, 3–5			OCBC Aquatic Centre, Singapore; Referees: Tamás Kovács-Csatlós (HUN), Marcella Braga (BRA)
19 July 2025; 13:45	Report	Quin 5	Goals	Turner 4	OCBC Aquatic Centre, Singapore; Referees: Tamás Kovács-Csatlós (HUN), Marcella Braga (BRA)

=== 5–8th place semifinals ===
21 July 2025; 16:00	Report	Australia	21–17	Japan	OCBC Aquatic Centre, Singapore; Referees: Jennifer McCall (USA), Germán Moller (ARG)
21 July 2025; 16:00	Report	Score by quarters: 7–6, 6–4, 2–3, 6–4			OCBC Aquatic Centre, Singapore; Referees: Jennifer McCall (USA), Germán Moller (ARG)
21 July 2025; 16:00	Report	Jackovich 5	Goals	Arima 5	OCBC Aquatic Centre, Singapore; Referees: Jennifer McCall (USA), Germán Moller (ARG)

21 July 2025; 20:00	Report	Italy	13–16	Netherlands	OCBC Aquatic Centre, Singapore; Referees: Tamás Kovács-Csatlós (HUN), Marta Cabanas (ESP)
21 July 2025; 20:00	Report	Score by quarters: 2–6, 4–2, 3–5, 4–3			OCBC Aquatic Centre, Singapore; Referees: Tamás Kovács-Csatlós (HUN), Marta Cabanas (ESP)
21 July 2025; 20:00	Report	Cocchiere 3	Goals	Keuning, L. Rogge 3	OCBC Aquatic Centre, Singapore; Referees: Tamás Kovács-Csatlós (HUN), Marta Cabanas (ESP)

=== Semifinals ===
21 July 2025; 17:35	Report	Greece	14–10	United States	OCBC Aquatic Centre, Singapore; Referees: Boris Margeta (SLO), Frank Ohme (GER)
21 July 2025; 17:35	Report	Score by quarters: 2–2, 4–3, 3–3, 5–2			OCBC Aquatic Centre, Singapore; Referees: Boris Margeta (SLO), Frank Ohme (GER)
21 July 2025; 17:35	Report	V. Plevritou 4	Goals	four players 2	OCBC Aquatic Centre, Singapore; Referees: Boris Margeta (SLO), Frank Ohme (GER)

21 July 2025; 21:35	Report	Hungary	15–9	Spain	OCBC Aquatic Centre, Singapore; Referees: Alessia Ferrari (ITA), Andrej Franulović (CRO)
21 July 2025; 21:35	Report	Score by quarters: 6–2, 5–2, 3–2, 1–3			OCBC Aquatic Centre, Singapore; Referees: Alessia Ferrari (ITA), Andrej Franulović (CRO)
21 July 2025; 21:35	Report	Keszthelyi, Szilágyi 3	Goals	Ruiz 3	OCBC Aquatic Centre, Singapore; Referees: Alessia Ferrari (ITA), Andrej Franulović (CRO)

=== 15th place game ===
19 July 2025; 09:00	Report	Singapore	4–8	South Africa	OCBC Aquatic Centre, Singapore; Referees: Aurély Blanchard (FRA), Andrej Franulović (CRO)
19 July 2025; 09:00	Report	Score by quarters: 0–3, 3–2, 1–2, 0–1			OCBC Aquatic Centre, Singapore; Referees: Aurély Blanchard (FRA), Andrej Franulović (CRO)
19 July 2025; 09:00	Report	four players 1	Goals	Williams 2	OCBC Aquatic Centre, Singapore; Referees: Aurély Blanchard (FRA), Andrej Franulović (CRO)

=== 13th place game ===
19 July 2025; 10:35	Report	Argentina	14–16 (PSO)	Croatia	OCBC Aquatic Centre, Singapore; Referees: Dasch Barber (RSA), Ivan Raković (SRB)
19 July 2025; 10:35	Report	Score by quarters: 2–3, 2–2, 4–5, 4–2 PSO: 2–4			OCBC Aquatic Centre, Singapore; Referees: Dasch Barber (RSA), Ivan Raković (SRB)
19 July 2025; 10:35	Report	Bacigalupo 4	Goals	Rožić 3	OCBC Aquatic Centre, Singapore; Referees: Dasch Barber (RSA), Ivan Raković (SRB)

=== Eleventh place game ===
21 July 2025; 09:00	Report	France	9–14	Great Britain	OCBC Aquatic Centre, Singapore; Referees: Stanko Ivanovski (MNE), Fiona Haigh (AUS)
21 July 2025; 09:00	Report	Score by quarters: 1–2, 3–4, 2–4, 3–4			OCBC Aquatic Centre, Singapore; Referees: Stanko Ivanovski (MNE), Fiona Haigh (AUS)
21 July 2025; 09:00	Report	Vernoux 3	Goals	Rogers, Turner 3	OCBC Aquatic Centre, Singapore; Referees: Stanko Ivanovski (MNE), Fiona Haigh (AUS)

=== Ninth place game ===
21 July 2025; 10:35	Report	China	10–6	New Zealand	OCBC Aquatic Centre, Singapore; Referees: Aurély Blanchard (FRA), Maxim Gerasimov (GBR)
21 July 2025; 10:35	Report	Score by quarters: 4–2, 2–1, 0–1, 4–2			OCBC Aquatic Centre, Singapore; Referees: Aurély Blanchard (FRA), Maxim Gerasimov (GBR)
21 July 2025; 10:35	Report	four players 2	Goals	McDowall 5	OCBC Aquatic Centre, Singapore; Referees: Aurély Blanchard (FRA), Maxim Gerasimov (GBR)

=== Seventh place game ===
23 July 2025; 16:00	Report	Japan	15–20	Italy	OCBC Aquatic Centre, Singapore; Referees: Aurély Blanchard (FRA), Nicholas Hodgers (AUS)
23 July 2025; 16:00	Report	Score by quarters: 5–5, 2–5, 2–6, 6–4			OCBC Aquatic Centre, Singapore; Referees: Aurély Blanchard (FRA), Nicholas Hodgers (AUS)
23 July 2025; 16:00	Report	Fukuda 3	Goals	Cergol, Gagliardi 5	OCBC Aquatic Centre, Singapore; Referees: Aurély Blanchard (FRA), Nicholas Hodgers (AUS)

=== Fifth place game ===
23 July 2025; 17:35	Report	Australia	11–13	Netherlands	OCBC Aquatic Centre, Singapore; Referees: Ivan Raković (SRB), Jennifer McCall (USA)
23 July 2025; 17:35	Report	Score by quarters: 2–2, 2–3, 4–4, 3–4			OCBC Aquatic Centre, Singapore; Referees: Ivan Raković (SRB), Jennifer McCall (USA)
23 July 2025; 17:35	Report	Williams 3	Goals	Bosveld 3	OCBC Aquatic Centre, Singapore; Referees: Ivan Raković (SRB), Jennifer McCall (USA)

=== Third place game ===
23 July 2025; 20:00	Report	United States	12–13	Spain	OCBC Aquatic Centre, Singapore; Referees: Andrej Franulović (CRO), Michiel Zwart (NED)
23 July 2025; 20:00	Report	Score by quarters: 2–4, 2–3, 5–4, 3–2			OCBC Aquatic Centre, Singapore; Referees: Andrej Franulović (CRO), Michiel Zwart (NED)
23 July 2025; 20:00	Report	Lineback 5	Goals	Espar 4	OCBC Aquatic Centre, Singapore; Referees: Andrej Franulović (CRO), Michiel Zwart (NED)

=== Final ===
23 July 2025; 21:35	Report	Greece	12–9	Hungary	OCBC Aquatic Centre, Singapore; Referees: Alessia Ferrari (ITA), Marta Cabanas (ESP)
23 July 2025; 21:35	Report	Score by quarters: 3–1, 5–3, 2–2, 2–3			OCBC Aquatic Centre, Singapore; Referees: Alessia Ferrari (ITA), Marta Cabanas (ESP)
23 July 2025; 21:35	Report	Tricha, Xenaki 3	Goals	Tiba, Hajdú 2	OCBC Aquatic Centre, Singapore; Referees: Alessia Ferrari (ITA), Marta Cabanas (ESP)

== Final ranking ==
Rank	Team
1st place, gold medalist(s)	Greece
2nd place, silver medalist(s)	Hungary
3rd place, bronze medalist(s)	Spain
4	United States
5	Netherlands
6	Australia
7	Italy
8	Japan
9	China
10	New Zealand
11	Great Britain
12	France
13	Croatia
14	Argentina
15	South Africa
16	Singapore

2025 Women's Water Polo World Champions

Greece
Second title

== Statistics and awards ==
=== Top goalscorers ===
Rank	Name	Goals	Shots	%
1	(Greece) Foteini Tricha	25	38	66
2	(Japan) Yumi Arima	23	52	44
3	(Italy) Chiara Ranalli	21	29	72
4	(Italy) Agnese Cocchiere	20	38	53
5	(Hungary) Rita Keszthelyi	19	32	59
5	(New Zealand) Morgan McDowall	19	31	61
7	(Italy) Roberta Bianconi	18	47	38
7	(Netherlands) Lieke Rogge	18	36	50
7	(United Kingdom) Lily Turner	18	40	45
7	(Australia) Alice Williams	18	34	53

=== Awards ===
The awards were announced on 23 July 2025.

All-star team
Goalkeeper	(Greece) Ioanna Stamatopoulou
Field player	(Japan) Yumi Arima
Field player	(United States) Emily Ausmus
Field player	(Italy) Agnese Cocchiere
Field player	(Hungary) Rita Keszthelyi
Field player	(Greece) Foteini Tricha
Field player	(New Zealand) Morgan McDowall
Other awards
Most Valuable Player	(Hungary) Rita Keszthelyi
Best Goalkeeper	(Greece) Ioanna Stamatopoulou
