= Synchronized swimming at the 2010 Central American and Caribbean Games =

Event held in Mayagüez, Puerto Rico

Synchronized Swimming at the 2010 Central American and Caribbean Games
- Venue: Natatorio RUM
- Location: (Puerto Rico) Mayagüez
- Dates: 25–31 July

The Synchronized swimming competition at the 2010 Central American and Caribbean Games was held in Mayagüez, Puerto Rico.

The tournament was scheduled to be held from 25 to 31 July at the Natatorio RUM in Mayagüez.

== Medal summary ==
=== Women's events ===
Event	Gold	Silver	Bronze
Solo Technical Routine	Nuria Diosdado (MEX)	Asly Alegria (COL)	Greisi Gomez (VEN)
Duet Technical Routine	Mexico	Colombia	Venezuela
Team Technical Routine	Mexico	Colombia	Venezuela
Solo Free Routine	Mexico	Venezuela	Colombia
Duet Free Routine	Mexico	Venezuela	Colombia
Team Free Routine	Mexico	Colombia	Venezuela
Combination	Colombia	Venezuela	Puerto Rico
