= Foteini Tricha =

Greek water polo player

Personal information
- Native name: Φωτεινή Τριχά
- National team: Greece
- Born: 26 April 2005 (age 21) Athens
- Height: 174 cm (5 ft 9 in)
- Weight: 70 kg (154 lb; 11 st 0 lb)

Sport
- Position: Wing
- Club: Olympiacos SFP
Medal record
Women's water polo
Representing Greece
World Championship
Gold medal – first place	2025 Singapore	Team
European Championship
Silver medal – second place	2022 Split
Bronze medal – third place	2026 Funchal

Foteini Tricha (Greek: Φωτεινή Τριχά; born 26 April 2005 in Athens) is a Greek water polo player who plays as a wing for Olympiacos SFP and the Greece women's national team.

In December 2025, she was named the world's top female water polo player for year 2025 winning the Total Player Award by World Aquatics, thus becoming the youngest ever recipient of this honour.

== Career ==
Tricha started playing water polo at age six in Marousi and later joined Nireas Chalandriou, where she won multiple youth championships. In 2020, she signed with Olympiacos and became part of their senior team in the Greek A1 Women's League. In 2023, she renewed her contract for four more years.

Internationally, Tricha was part of the Greece U17 team that won bronze at the 2019 European Championships and silver at the 2022 FINA Junior World Championships, where she was named MVP.

She made her senior debut in 2023 with the Greek national team, and played well at the 2025 World Aquatic Championships in Singapore, being the first scorer of the whole tournament with 25 goals scored, and led the Greek national team to the gold medal.
