= Kinsmen Sports Centre =

Sports venue in Edmonton, Alberta

Coordinates: 53°31′34″N 113°30′24″W

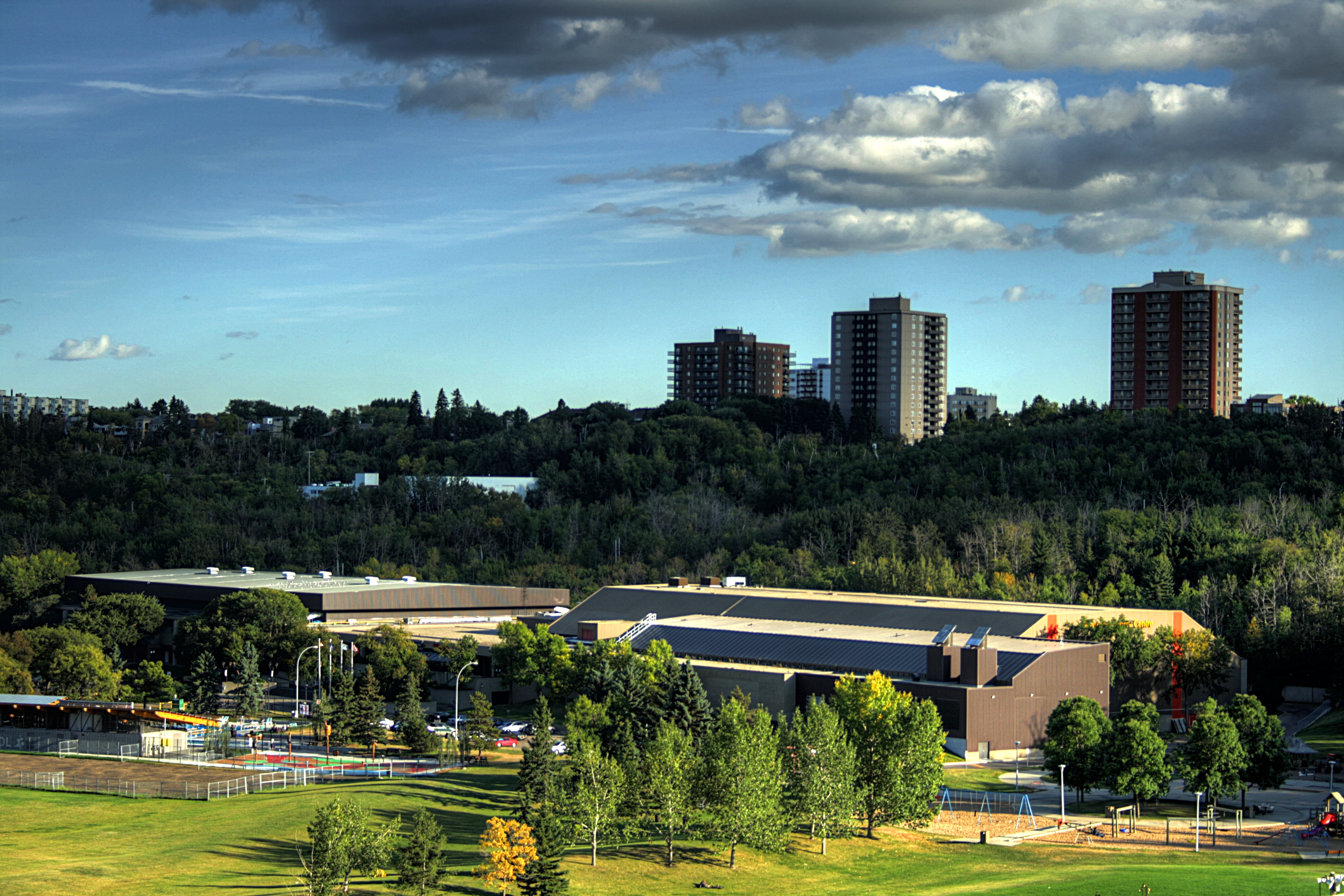
The Kinsmen Sports Centre in Edmonton's river valley.

The Kinsmen Sports Centre is a multi-purpose sport and recreation facility located in Edmonton, Alberta, Canada. The land surrounding the facility is called Kinsmen Park, part of Edmonton's city-long North Saskatchewan River valley parks system. Its namesake is the Kinsmen, a service organization. The Kinsmen Sports Centre is owned by the City of Edmonton and operated by the Community Services Department. It was the competition site for the 2005 World Masters Games diving, swimming, synchronized swimming and table tennis.

== Kinsmen Field House ==
The field house was opened January 3, 1968, and was intended to be the first phase of a multifaceted Kinsmen Village that would eventually include an Olympic-size swimming pool and an indoor/outdoor performing arts theatre. At the time of its creation, it was unique among such facilities in Canada and remains the only such facility in North America which is open to general use.

Kinsmen Field House once hosted concerts by many famous artists, including Led Zeppelin & Vanilla Fudge (1969), Frank Zappa (1971), Manfred Mann & Kiss (1974), Kansas (1975), Queen (1975), Wishbone Ash (1975), Max Webster (1977), Rush (1975, 1976 & 1977), The Lillo's (1978), Bob Marley (1979), Gary Numan (1980), Motorhead (1981), Ozzy Osbourne (1981), Girlschool, Iron Maiden and The Scorpions (1982), The Clash (1982), Billy Idol w/Platinum Blonde (1984), Kiss (1985) and Uriah Heep (1986).

== Kinsmen Aquatic Centre ==
In 1976, the Kinsmen Aquatic Centre was added to the facility to serve the 1978 Commonwealth Games. Also added in 1992 was the Keltie Byrne Fitness Centre.

== Rehabilitation ==
The facility is undergoing a multi-phase rehabilitation project to upgrade and replace aging infrastructure, particularly within its aquatic centre. The work includes improvements to pool basins, as well as mechanical and electrical systems, and upgrades to amenities such as flooring, showers, and lighting.

The rehabilitation, which began in the early 2020s, is being carried out in phases to allow the facility to remain operational during construction. The project prioritizes health and safety upgrades, including work on the Don Smith Memorial Pool and the aquatic centre’s deep tank, bringing these facilities up to current standards while extending the lifespan of the centre.
