= Maximiliano Aguilar =

Mexican swimmer (born 1950)

Personal information
- Born: 25 May 1950 (age 76) Mexico City, Mexico

Sport
- Sport: Water polo
Medal record
Representing Mexico
Pan American Games
Gold medal – first place	1975 Mexico City	Men's tournament
Bronze medal – third place	1971 Cali	Men's tournament

Maximiliano Aguilar (born 25 May 1950) is a Mexican former swimmer. He competed in the men's 100 metre butterfly at the 1968 Summer Olympics and in the water polo at the 1972 Summer Olympics and the 1976 Summer Olympics.
