= Trinidad and Tobago men's national water polo team =

Trinidad and Tobago
- FINA code: TTO
- Confederation: UANA (Americas)

The Trinidad and Tibago men's national water polo team is the representative for Trinidad and Tobago in international men's water polo. The team competed at the 2015 Pan American Games in Toronto, Canada.
