= Venezuela women's national water polo team =

Venezuela
- FINA code: VEN
- Association: Venezuela Aquatic Federation
- Confederation: UANA (Americas)

The Venezuela women's national water polo team is the representative for Venezuela in international women's water polo.

== Results ==
=== World Championship ===
- 2003 — 14th place
- 2005 — 14th place

== See also ==
- Venezuela men's national water polo team
