= Mexico women's national water polo team =

Mexican national sports team

Mexico
- FINA code: MEX
- Confederation: UANA (Americas)

The Mexico women's national water polo team is the representative for Mexico in international women's water polo.
