= Venezuela men's national water polo team =

Venezuela
- FINA code: VEN
- Association: Venezuela Aquatic Federation
- Confederation: UANA (Americas)

The Venezuela men's national water polo team is the representative for Venezuela in international men's water polo.

The team won the bronze medal at the 2018 South American Games.
