= Water polo at the 2009 World Aquatics Championships – Women's team rosters =

These are the rosters of all participating teams at the women's water polo tournament at the 2009 World Aquatics Championships held between July 19–31 in Rome, Italy.

== United States ==
No.	Name	Date of birth	L/R	Position	Height	Weight
1	Elizabeth Armstrong	31 January 1983	R	GK		
2	Heather Petri	13 June 1978	R	FP		
3	Brittany Hayes	7 February 1985	L	FP		
4	Brenda Villa	18 April 1980	R	FP		
5	Lauren Wenger	11 March 1984	R	FP		
6	Tanya Gandy	20 August 1987	R	FP		
7	Kelly Rulon	16 August 1984	R	FP		
8	Jessica Steffens	7 April 1987	R	FP		
9	Elsie Windes	17 June 1985	R	FP		
10	Alison Gregorka	29 June 1985	R	FP		
11	Moriah Van Norman	30 May 1984	R	FP		
12	Kameryn Craig	21 July 1987	R	FP		
13	Jaime Komer	1 September 1981	R	GK		

== Spain ==
No.	Name	Date of birth	L/R	Position	Height	Weight
1	Patricia del Soto	16 December 1980	R	GK		
2	Blanca Gil Sorli	19 September 1983	R	CF		
3	Olga Domenech	1 January 1988		FP		
4	Irene Hagen	8 January 1981	R	CB		
5	Miriam Lopez-Escribano	14 March 1985	R	D		
6	Jennifer Pareja	8 May 1984	R	D		
7	Cristina Lopez	20 October 1982	R	D		
8	Pilar Pena	4 April 1986	L	D		
9	Clara Aller	11 April 1987	R	CF		
10	Ona Meseguer	20 February 1988	L	D		
11	Maica Garcia	17 October 1990	R	CF		
12	Laura López	13 January 1988	R	CB	1.70 m (5 ft 7 in)	
13	Laura Ester	22 January 1990	R	GK	1.70 m (5 ft 7 in)	

== South Africa ==
No.	Name	Date of birth	L/R	Position	Height	Weight
1	Hayley Duncan	20 May 1981	L	GK	1.69 m (5 ft 7 in)	
2	Delaine Christian	26 May 1993		FP	1.69 m (5 ft 7 in)	
3	Megan Schooling	1 May 1989	R	CB	1.82 m (6 ft 0 in)	
4	Laura Barrett	19 June 1986	R	FP	1.68 m (5 ft 6 in)	
5	Tammy Heydenrych	29 October 1980	L	CF	1.69 m (5 ft 7 in)	
6	Sarah Harris	11 November 1987	R	FP	1.85 m (6 ft 1 in)	
7	Christine Barretto	23 August 1980	R	FP	1.70 m (5 ft 7 in)	
8	Lee-Anne Keet	12 October 1982	R	FP	1.54 m (5 ft 1 in)	
9	Samantha Keet	15 July 1988	R	CB	1.69 m (5 ft 7 in)	
10	Marcelle Keet	25 October 1984	R	FP	1.69 m (5 ft 7 in)	
11	Nicolette Poulos	4 January 1977	R	FP	1.70 m (5 ft 7 in)	
12	Naydene Smith	27 August 1987	R	FP	1.77 m (5 ft 10 in)	
13	Mbali Mpofu	23 May 1990	R	FP	1.63 m (5 ft 4 in)	

== Russia ==
No.	Name	Date of birth	L/R	Position	Height	Weight
1	Evgeniya Protsenko	25 November 1983	R	GK		
2	Nadezda Glyzina	20 May 1988	R	D	1.79 m (5 ft 10 in)	
3	Ekaterina Prokofyeva	13 March 1991	R	D		
4	Sofia Konukh	9 March 1980	R	CB	1.82 m (6 ft 0 in)	
5	Alena Vylegzhanina	14 August 1987		FP		
6	Natalia Ryzhova-Alenicheva	3 August 1987	R			
7	Ekaterina Pantyulina	6 October 1989	R	D		
8	Evgenia Soboleva	26 August 1988	R	CB		
9	Anna Timofeeva	18 July 1987	R	CF		
10	Olga Belyaeva	18 March 1985	R	CF		
11	Evgenia Ivanova	26 July 1987	R	D		
12	Yulia Gaufler	18 August 1986	R	CB		
13	Maria Kovtunovskaya	19 December 1988	R	GK		

== New Zealand ==
No.	Name	Date of birth	L/R	Position	Height	Weight
1	Carina Harache		R	GK		
2	Emily Cox		R	CF		
3	Kelly Mason		R	D		
4	Rebecca Mc Guinness		R	D		
5	Amy Logan		R	CB		
6	Lynlee Smith		L	D		
7	Ashley Smallfield		R	CB		
8	Lauren Sieprath		R	D		
9	Anna Sieprath		L	D		
10	Casie Bowry		R	CF		
11	Kristen Hudson		L	D		
12	Alexandra Myles		R	D		
13	Dana Harvey		R	GK		

== Netherlands ==
No.	Name	Date of birth	L/R	Position	Height	Weight
1	Ilse van der Meijden	22 October 1988	R	GK		
2	Miloushka Smit	21 November 1984	R	FP		
3	Mieke Cabout	30 March 1986	R	FP	1.82 m (6 ft 0 in)	
4	Biurakn Hakhverdian	4 October 1985	R	FP	1.72 m (5 ft 8 in)	
5	Sabrina van der Sloot	16 March 1991	R	FP	1.75 m (5 ft 9 in)	
6	Nomi Stomphorst	23 August 1992	R	FP	1.72 m (5 ft 8 in)	
7	Iefke van Belkum	22 July 1986	R	FP	1.85 m (6 ft 1 in)	
8	Noeki Klein	28 April 1983	R	FP		
9	Jantien Cabout	10 January 1988	L	FP		
10	Nienke Vermeer	18 July 1989	R	FP		
11	Rianne Guichelaar	16 August 1983	L	FP		
12	Mieke van der Sloot	23 April 1981	R	FP		
13	Anne Heinis	20 May 1987	R	GK		

== Kazakhstan ==
No.	Name	Date of birth	L/R	Position	Height	Weight
1	Galina Rytova	10 September 1975		GK		
2	Natalya Kutuzova	18 March 1975		FP		
3	Aizhan Akilbayeva	13 September 1991		FP		
4	Anna Turova	31 July 1990		FP		
5	Natalya Rybachek	13 May 1988		FP		
6	Anna Zubkova	3 February 1980		FP		
7	Zamira Myrzabekova	12 June 1991		FP		
8	Yekatarina Gariyeva	11 June 1981		FP		
9	Agata Tnasheva	6 February 1989		FP		
10	Marina Gritsenko	17 August 1980		FP		
11	Alexandra Rozhentseva	8 January 1985		FP		
12	Assem Mussarova	13 August 1990		FP		
13	Alexandra Turova	31 July 1990		GK		

== Italy ==
No.	Name	Date of birth	L/R	Position	Height	Weight
1	Elena Gigli	9 July 1985	R	GK	1.90 m (6 ft 3 in)	
2	Simona Abbate	22 August 1983	R	FP	1.74 m (5 ft 9 in)	
3	Elisa Casanova	26 November 1973	L	CF		
4	Silvia Bosurgi	17 April 1979	R	FP	1.65 m (5 ft 5 in)	
5	Daniela Lavorini	15 August 1976	R	D	1.63 m (5 ft 4 in)	
6	Arianna Garibotti	9 December 1989	R	FP		
7	Tania Di Mario	4 May 1979	R	D	1.67 m (5 ft 6 in)	
8	Roberta Bianconi	8 July 1989	R	FP		
9	Giulia Emmolo	16 October 1991	L	D	1.72 m (5 ft 8 in)	
10	Federica Rocco	25 November 1984	R	CB	1.76 m (5 ft 9 in)	
11	Annalisa Bosello	19 March 1988	R	CF	1.78 m (5 ft 10 in)	
12	Teresa Frassinetti	24 December 1985	R	CF	1.78 m (5 ft 10 in)	
13	Eleonora Gay	16 June 1979	R	GK	1.72 m (5 ft 8 in)	

== Hungary ==
No.	Name	Date of birth	L/R	Position	Height	Weight
1	Patricia Horvath	7 December 1977	R	GK		
2	Eszter Tomaskovics	23 August 1987	R	FP		
3	Ildiko Toth	23 April 1987	R	FP		
4	Dora Kisteleki	11 May 1983	R	FP		
5	Gabriella Szucs	7 March 1988	R	FP		
6	Orsolya Takacs	20 May 1985	R	FP		
7	Rita Dravucz	14 April 1980	R	FP		
8	Rita Keszthelyi	10 December 1991	R	FP		
9	Fruzsina Brávik	6 October 1986	R	FP	1.81 m (5 ft 11 in)	
10	Aniko Pelle	28 September 1978	R	FP		
11	Agnes Valkai	27 February 1981	R	FP		
12	Rita Poszkoli	20 July 1987	R	FP		
13	Aniko Gyongyossy	21 May 1990	R	GK		

== Greece ==
No.	Name	Date of birth	L/R	Position	Height	Weight
1	Maria Tsouri	25 May 1986	R	GK	1.67 m (5 ft 6 in)	
2	Christina Tsoukala	8 July 1991	R	CB	1.85 m (6 ft 1 in)	
3	Konstantina Kouteli	10 April 1981	R	D	1.75 m (5 ft 9 in)	
4	Ilektra Psouni	12 September 1985	R	CB	1.70 m (5 ft 7 in)	
5	Kyriaki Liosi	30 October 1979	R	D	1.70 m (5 ft 7 in)	
6	Alkisti Avramidou	26 February 1988	R	CB	1.70 m (5 ft 7 in)	
7	Alexandra Asimaki	28 June 1988	R	CF	1.70 m (5 ft 7 in)	
8	Antigoni Roumpesi	19 July 1983	R	D	1.78 m (5 ft 10 in)	
9	Angeliki Gerolimou	22 June 1982	R	D	1.69 m (5 ft 7 in)	
10	Triantafyllia Manolioudaki	19 March 1986	R	D	1.70 m (5 ft 7 in)	
11	Stavroula Antonakou	2 May 1982	R	D	1.70 m (5 ft 7 in)	
12	Georgia Lara	31 May 1980	R	CF	1.75 m (5 ft 9 in)	
13	Eleni Kouvdou	9 August 1989	R	GK	1.75 m (5 ft 9 in)	

== Germany ==
No.	Name	Date of birth	L/R	Position	Height	Weight
1	Simone Budde	2 January 1979	R	GK	1.83 m (6 ft 0 in)	
2	Sandra Schilling	26 June 1989	R	D	1.62 m (5 ft 4 in)	
3	Linda Gerritsen	12 March 1983	R	D	1.69 m (5 ft 7 in)	
4	Claudia Kern	28 January 1990	R	CF	1.75 m (5 ft 9 in)	
5	Katrin Dierolf	6 February 1979	R	D	1.75 m (5 ft 9 in)	
6	Claudia Blomenkamp	30 December 1986	R	CB	1.78 m (5 ft 10 in)	
7	Alexandra Schilling	9 November 1981	R	CB	1.78 m (5 ft 10 in)	
8	Mariam Salloum	23 August 1989	R	D	1.68 m (5 ft 6 in)	
9	Theresa Klein	10 August 1984	R	D	1.66 m (5 ft 5 in)	
10	Nina Wengst	20 March 1979	R	CF	1.75 m (5 ft 9 in)	
11	Carmen Gelse	22 September 1987	R	CB	1.75 m (5 ft 9 in)	
12	Mandy Zollner	17 April 1985	R	CF	1.70 m (5 ft 7 in)	
13	Hanna Hanholz	17 January 1987	R	GK	1.82 m (6 ft 0 in)	

== China ==
No.	Name	Date of birth	L/R	Position	Height	Weight
1	Yang Jun	28 April 1988	R	GK		
2	Teng Fei	23 January 1988	R	D		
3	Liu Ping	1 May 1987	R	CB		
4	Sun Yu Jun	30 January 1987	R	D		
5	He Jin	3 May 1987	R	CF		
6	Sun Yating	24 February 1988	R	CF		
7	Zhang Lei	9 May 1982	R	D		
8	Gao Ao	26 July 1990	R	D		
9	Wang Yi	29 July 1987	R	D		
10	Ma Huanhuan	13 January 1990	R	D		
11	Sun Hui Zi	11 June 1990	R	CB		
12	Qiao Lei Ying	24 August 1989	L	D		
13	Wang Ying	7 August 1988	R	GK		

== Canada ==
No.	Name	Date of birth	L/R	Position	Height	Weight
1	Rachel Riddell	5 September 1984	R	GK		
2	Krystina Alogbo	20 January 1986	R	CF		
3	Katrina Monton	23 September 1987	R	CF		
4	Emily Csikos	29 July 1988	R	D		
5	Joelle Bekhazi	27 April 1987	R	D		
6	Whitney Genoway	13 March 1986	R	D		
7	Rosanna Tomiuk	1 October 1984	R	D		
8	Dominique Perreault	26 October 1984	L	D		
9	Carmen Eggens	13 February 1988	R	CB		
10	Christine Robinson	17 May 1984	R	CF		
11	Tara Campbell	21 January 1983	R	CB		
12	Marina Radu	5 September 1984	R	CB		
13	Marissa Janssens	9 September 1988	R	GK		

== Brazil ==
No.	Name	Date of birth	L/R	Position	Height	Weight
1	Tess Oliveira	6 January 1987	R	GK	1.65 m (5 ft 5 in)	
2	Cecilia Canetti	16 January 1987	R	CB	1.77 m (5 ft 10 in)	
3	Flavia Fernandes	13 February 1981	R	D	1.56 m (5 ft 1 in)	
4	Marina Canetti	24 January 1983	R	CF	1.70 m (5 ft 7 in)	
5	Marina Zablith	4 March 1987	R	CB	1.80 m (5 ft 11 in)	
6	Gabriela Mantellati	28 October 1991	R	CF	1.75 m (5 ft 9 in)	
7	Cristina Beer	22 November 1980	R	D	1.69 m (5 ft 7 in)	
8	Luisa Carvalho	2 June 1983	R	CF	1.78 m (5 ft 10 in)	
9	Fernanda Lissoni	31 August 1980	R	D	1.68 m (5 ft 6 in)	
10	Camila Pedrosa	12 March 1975	R	D	1.72 m (5 ft 8 in)	
11	Flavia Vigna	7 December 1990	R	D	1.69 m (5 ft 7 in)	
12	Melina Teno	19 August 1984	R	D	1.78 m (5 ft 10 in)	
13	Manuela Canetti	26 December 1988	R	GK	1.76 m (5 ft 9 in)	

== Australia ==
No.	Name	Date of birth	L/R	Position	Height	Weight
1	Alicia Mc Cormack	7 June 1983	R	GK	1.68 m (5 ft 6 in)	
2	Holly Lincoln-Smith	1 January 1989	R	CF	1.79 m (5 ft 10 in)	
3	Sophie Smith	26 February 1986	R	D	1.81 m (5 ft 11 in)	
4	Rebecca Rippon	26 December 1978	R	D	1.67 m (5 ft 6 in)	
5	Jane Moran	6 June 1985	R	D	1.67 m (5 ft 6 in)	
6	Bronwen Knox	16 April 1986	R	CB	1.82 m (6 ft 0 in)	
7	Rowena Webster	27 December 1987	R	D	1.77 m (5 ft 10 in)	
8	Kate Gynther	5 July 1982	R	D	1.74 m (5 ft 9 in)	
9	Glencora Ralph	8 August 1988	R	D	1.78 m (5 ft 10 in)	
10	Jemma Dessauvagie	20 August 1986	R	CF	1.79 m (5 ft 10 in)	
11	Melissa Rippon	20 January 1981	R	D	1.69 m (5 ft 7 in)	
12	Nicola Zagame	11 August 1990	R	CB	1.60 m (5 ft 3 in)	
13	Victoria Brown	27 July 1985	R	GK	1.83 m (6 ft 0 in)	

== Uzbekistan ==
No.	Name	Date of birth	L/R	Position	Height	Weight
1	Natalya Murashkina	6 March 1988	R	GK	1.68 m (5 ft 6 in)	
2	Diana Dadabaeva	29 July 1991	R	FP	1.67 m (5 ft 6 in)	
3	Anna Plyusova	10 October 1992	R	CB	1.72 m (5 ft 8 in)	
4	Viktoriya Gorodchanina	9 November 1987	R	FP	1.72 m (5 ft 8 in)	
5	Evgeniya Ivanova	13 June 1991	R	FP	1.64 m (5 ft 5 in)	
6	Eseniya Piftor	31 January 1995	R	FP	1.73 m (5 ft 8 in)	
7	Natalya Plyusova	22 August 1988	R	D	1.72 m (5 ft 8 in)	
8	Anna Sheglova	1 December 1987	R	CF	1.83 m (6 ft 0 in)	
9	Ramilyn Halikova	26 August 1986	R	D	1.70 m (5 ft 7 in)	
10	Viktoriya Salikhova	6 March 1988	R	FP	1.70 m (5 ft 7 in)	
11	Olga Mayorova	4 August 1980	R	CB	1.76 m (5 ft 9 in)	
12	Lyutsia Gibazova	10 June 1985	R	FP	1.66 m (5 ft 5 in)	
13	Elena Dukhanova	10 September 1994	R	GK	1.65 m (5 ft 5 in)	

== See also ==
- Water polo at the 2009 World Aquatics Championships – Men's team rosters
