= Water polo at the 2003 World Aquatics Championships – Women's team rosters =

This article shows all participating team squads at the 2003 FINA Women's World Water Polo Championship, held in Barcelona, Catalonia, Spain from July 13 to July 25, 2003.

== Australia ==
- Jemma Brownlow
- Melissa Byram
- Nikita Cuffe
- Naomi Castle
- Joanne Fox
- Kate Gynther
- Emma Knox
- Elise Norwood
- Melissa Rippon
- Rebecca Rippon
- Jodie Stuhmcke
- Bronwyn Smith
- Taryn Woods

Head coach:

- István Gorgenyi

== Brazil ==
- Marina Canetti
- Viviane Costa
- Flávia Fernandes
- Cláudia Graner
- Andréa Henriques
- Mayla Siracusa
- Maria Marques
- Tess Oliveira
- Rubi Palmieri
- Camila Pedrosa
- Mariana Resstom
- Mariana Roriz
- Melina Teno

Head coach:

- David Hart

== Canada ==
- Marie Luc Arpin
- Christi Bardecki
- Johanne Bégin
- Cora Campbell
- Melissa Collins
- Andrea Dewar
- Valérie Dionne
- Ann Dow
- Susan Gardiner
- Marianne Illing
- Rachel Kiddell
- Whynter Lamarre
- Jana Salat

Head coach:

- Patrick Oaten

== France ==
- Myriam Argaud
- Cécile Busteau
- Gaelle De Rycke
- Isabelle Fack
- Laure Gauthreau
- Alice Goulut
- Louise Guillet
- Vanessa Hernandez
- Perrine Metay
- Virginie Mozdzierz
- Aurelia Picot
- Jenny Ritz
- Caroline Ruder

Head coach:

- Jean-Luc Doucereux

== Germany ==
- Simone Budde
- Barbara Bujka
- Viktoria Bujka
- Katrin Dierolf
- Linda Gerrifsen
- Laura Gruber
- Theresa Klein
- Sabine Kottig
- Monika Kruszona
- Imke Odenthal
- Lina Rohe
- Ariane Rump
- Stefanie Schindelbauer

Head coach:

- Marcel ter Bals

== Great Britain ==
- Bernice Cowton
- Helen Dacre
- Larissa Davies
- Laura Evans
- Karin Hales
- Ruth Hawney
- Frances Leighton
- Kate Lewis
- Carol Mohan
- Tara Smith
- Hannah Wild
- Angela Winstanley
- Siobhan Winter

Head coach:

- Nick Hume

== Greece ==
- Stavroula Antonakou
- Dimitra Asilian
- Georgia Ellinaki
- Maria Kanellopoulou
- Stavroula Kozompoli
- Georgia Lara
- Kyriaki Liosi
- Evangelia Moraitidou
- Anthoula Mylonaki
- Aikaterini Oikonomopoulou
- Amalia Paterou
- Sofia Petsali
- Antigoni Roumpesi

Head coach:

- Kyriakos Iosifidis

== Hungary ==
- Anett Gyore
- Rita Dravucz
- Patricia Horvath
- Dora Kisteleki
- Aniko Pelle
- Ágnes Primász
- Kata Redei
- Mercedes Stieber
- Krisztina Szremko
- Zsuzsanna Tiba
- Agnes Valkay
- Erzebet Valkay
- Ildiko Zirighne

Head coach:

- Tamás Faragó

== Italy ==
- Carmela Allucci
- Alexandra Araujo
- Silvia Bosurgi
- Francesca Conti
- Melania Greco
- Erika Lava
- Giusi Malato
- Tania di Mario
- Martina Miceli
- Maddalena Musumeci
- Cinzia Ragusa
- Noémi Tóth
- Manuela Zanchi

Head coach:

- Pierluigi Formiconi

== Japan ==
- Momoko Arai
- Tomoka Gyoten
- Akiko Inagaki
- Aya Kakoshi
- Mari Kawasaki
- Naoko Koiso
- Mayu Mimaki
- Miki Numazaki
- Makoto Tanaka
- Mika Yahagi
- Akane Yamazaki
- Mari Yasumi
- Machi Yoshioka

Head coach:

- Fumiaki Kimura

== Kazakhstan ==
- Natalya Galkina
- Marina Gritsenko
- Tatyana Gubina
- Natalya Ignatyeva
- Assel Jakayeva
- Alyona Klimenko
- Svetlana Koroleva
- Natalya Krassilinikova
- Natalya Kutuzova
- Galina Rytova
- Irina Tolkunova
- Alexandra Zarkova
- Anna Zubkova

Head coach:

- Andrey Sazykin

== Netherlands ==
- Marleen Ars
- Gillian van den Berg
- Daniëlle de Bruin
- Rianne Guichelaar
- Hanneke Kappen
- Simone Koot
- Karin Kuipers
- Meike de Nooy
- Jorieke Oostendorp
- Heleen Peerenboom
- Tjarda Rodenhuis
- Carla Quint
- Mieke van der Sloot

Head coach:

- Peter Paul Metz

== Russia ==
- Svetlana Bogdanova
- Maria Yaina
- Sofia Konoukh
- Veronika Linkova
- Tatiana Petrova
- Ekaterina Salimova
- Natalia Shepelina
- Ekaterina Shishova
- Elena Smurova
- Olga Turova
- Valentina Vorontsova
- Galina Zlotnikova
- Anastasia Zubkova

Head coach:

- Yury Mitianin

== Spain ==
- Elisabeth Fuentes
- Blanca Gil
- Sara Dominguez
- Cristina López
- Anna Pardo
- Jennifer Pareja
- Anna Ramirez
- Mariona Ribera
- Belen Sanchez
- Patricia del Soto
- Cristina Ungo de Velasco
- Merce Valles
- Mireia Ventura

Head coach:

- Gaspar Ventura

== United States ==
- Robin Beauregard
- Margaret Dingeldein
- Gabrielle Domanic
- Ellen Estes
- Jacqueline Frank
- Natalie Golda
- Ericka Lorenz
- Heather Moody
- Thalia Munro
- Nicolle Payne
- Heather Petri
- Amber Stachowski
- Brenda Villa

Head coach:

- Guy Baker

== Venezuela ==
- Almedia Aldana
- Yesvia Alvarado
- Gregory Aguilar
- Yessenia Bastardo
- Carol Caliz
- Andreina Diaz
- Rocio Galue
- Fabiola Godoy
- Serginel Maza
- Selene Rego
- Stephany Rivero
- Thais Suarez
- Xomar Vilar

Head coach:

- Carlos Fernandez
