= Water polo at the 2007 World Aquatics Championships – Women's team rosters =

These are the rosters of all participating teams at the women's water polo tournament at the 2007 World Aquatics Championships held between 18 March to 1 April in Melbourne, Australia.

== Hungary ==
No.	Name	Date of birth	L/R	Position	Height	Weight	Caps
1	Patricia Horvath	7 December 1977	R	goalkeeper			
2	Eszter Tomaskovics	23 August 1987	R				
3	Barbara Bujka	5 September 1986	R				
4	Timea Benko	24 April 1978	R				
5	Mercedes Stieber	4 September 1974	R				
6	Orsolya Takacs	20 May 1985	R				
7	Anett Timea Gyore	10 December 1981	R				
8	Krisztina Zantleitner	8 May 1974	R				
9	Fruzsina Bravik	6 October 1986	R				
10	Aniko Pelle	28 September 1978	R				
11	Ágnes Valkai	27 February 1981	R				
12	Agnes Primasz	5 March 1980	R				
13	Henrietta Bravik	14 November 1984	R	goalkeeper			

== Greece ==
No.	Name	Date of birth	L/R	Position	Height	Weight	Caps
1	Maria Tsouri	25 May 1986	R	goalkeeper	1.66 m (5 ft 5 in)	60 kg (130 lb)	
2	Kelina Kantzou	13 June 1985	L				100
3	Angeliki Gerolymou	22 June 1982	R	driver	1.68 m (5 ft 6 in)	70 kg (150 lb)	18
4	Sofia Iosifidou	13 January 1981	R	centre back	1.73 m (5 ft 8 in)	61 kg (134 lb)	
5	Kyriaki Liosi	30 October 1979	R	driver	1.70 m (5 ft 7 in)	63 kg (139 lb)	
6	Stavroula Kozompoli	14 January 1974	R	centre forward	1.80 m (5 ft 11 in)	73 kg (161 lb)	350
7	Aikaterini Oikonomopoulou	16 February 1978	R	centre back	1.80 m (5 ft 11 in)	60 kg (130 lb)	
8	Antigoni Roupesi	19 July 1983	R	driver	1.77 m (5 ft 10 in)	80 kg (180 lb)	
9	Evangelia Moraitidou	26 March 1975	R	centre back	1.84 m (6 ft 0 in)	74 kg (163 lb)	310
10	Alkisti Avramidou	26 February 1988	R	driver	1.70 m (5 ft 7 in)	60 kg (130 lb)	
11	Stavroula Antonakou	2 May 1982	R	driver	1.70 m (5 ft 7 in)	57 kg (126 lb)	
12	Georgia Lara	31 May 1980	R	centre forward	1.75 m (5 ft 9 in)	78 kg (172 lb)	240
13	Eleni Kouvdou	9 August 1989	R	goalkeeper	1.75 m (5 ft 9 in)	72 kg (159 lb)	

== Germany ==
No.	Name	Date of birth	L/R	Position	Height	Weight	Caps
1	Simone Budde	2 January 1972		goalkeeper			
2	Lina Rohe	18 May 1984			1.79 m (5 ft 10 in)	67 kg (148 lb)	
3	Linda Gerritsen	12 March 1983			1.70 m (5 ft 7 in)	62 kg (137 lb)	
4	Ariane Rump	25 January 1981			1.74 m (5 ft 9 in)		
5	Katrin Dierolf	16 February 1979			1.75 m (5 ft 9 in)	75 kg (165 lb)	
6	Claudia Blomenkamp	30 December 1986					
7	Monika Kruszona	4 August 1985			1.80 m (5 ft 11 in)	73 kg (161 lb)	
8	Nadine Kunz	11 November 1983			1.77 m (5 ft 10 in)	69 kg (152 lb)	
9	Theresa Klein	10 August 1984			1.65 m (5 ft 5 in)	55 kg (121 lb)	
10	Nina Wengst	20 March 1979			1.75 m (5 ft 9 in)	75 kg (165 lb)	
11	Carmen Gelse	22 September 1987			1.75 m (5 ft 9 in)	62 kg (137 lb)	
12	Mandy Zoellner	17 April 1985			1.70 m (5 ft 7 in)	69 kg (152 lb)	
13	Claudia Schonitz	3 December 1981		goalkeeper	1.81 m (5 ft 11 in)	70 kg (150 lb)	

== Cuba ==
No.	Name	Date of birth	L/R	Position	Height	Weight	Caps
1	Mairelis Zunzunequi	8 July 1986	R	goalkeeper	1.66 m (5 ft 5 in)	70 kg (150 lb)	25
2	Yunieska Diago	9 September 1980	L	driver	1.74 m (5 ft 9 in)	76 kg (168 lb)	30
3	Yeliana Bravo	8 September 1986	R	centre forward	1.75 m (5 ft 9 in)	79 kg (174 lb)	10
4	Hirovis Hernandez	23 August 1979	R		1.66 m (5 ft 5 in)	63 kg (139 lb)	45
5	Danay Gutierrez	12 April 1982	R	driver	1.73 m (5 ft 8 in)	70 kg (150 lb)	55
6	Yamira Caballero				1.80 m (5 ft 11 in)	74 kg (163 lb)	45
7	Adriana Garlobo	28 October 1988	R	centre back	1.85 m (6 ft 1 in)	80 kg (180 lb)	10
8	Olga Soler	24 June 1976	R	centre forward	1.79 m (5 ft 10 in)	78 kg (172 lb)	55
9	Yanelis Andrew	11 October 1976	R	centre back	1.79 m (5 ft 10 in)	75 kg (165 lb)	55
10	Lisandra Frometa	4 June 1978	R	centre back	1.75 m (5 ft 9 in)	77 kg (170 lb)	40
11	Leyanis Gutierrez	21 December 1987	R	driver	1.75 m (5 ft 9 in)	79 kg (174 lb)	30
12	Neldys Truffin	24 December 1980	R	centre back	1.80 m (5 ft 11 in)	73 kg (161 lb)	50
13	Cheila Gomez	26 June 1973	R	goalkeeper	1.77 m (5 ft 10 in)	69 kg (152 lb)	70

== China ==
No.	Name	Date of birth	L/R	Position	Height	Weight	Caps
1	Yang Jun	28 April 1983	R	goalkeeper	1.81 m (5 ft 11 in)	70 kg (150 lb)	26
2	Teng Fei	23 January 1983	R	driver	1.70 m (5 ft 7 in)	64 kg (141 lb)	19
3	Qiao Leiying	24 August 1989	L		1.76 m (5 ft 9 in)	68 kg (150 lb)	14
4	Sun Yujun	30 January 1987	R		1.68 m (5 ft 6 in)	63 kg (139 lb)	26
5	He Jin	3 May 1987	R	centre forward	1.78 m (5 ft 10 in)	91 kg (201 lb)	26
6	Sun Yating	24 February 1983	R	centre forward	1.80 m (5 ft 11 in)	75 kg (165 lb)	16
7	Mo Fengmin	27 April 1986	R		1.69 m (5 ft 7 in)	55 kg (121 lb)	26
8	Gao Ao	26 July 1990	R		1.70 m (5 ft 7 in)	70 kg (150 lb)	21
9	Wang Yi	29 July 1987	R		1.79 m (5 ft 10 in)	69 kg (152 lb)	16
10	Ma Huanhuan	13 January 1990	R	centre forward	1.79 m (5 ft 10 in)	70 kg (150 lb)	16
11	Sun Huizi	11 June 1990	R	centre forward	1.81 m (5 ft 11 in)	70 kg (150 lb)	16
12	Zheng Xu	19 September 1983	R		1.76 m (5 ft 9 in)	65 kg (143 lb)	17
13	Tan Ying	30 June 1987	R	goalkeeper	1.84 m (6 ft 0 in)	72 kg (159 lb)	14

== Canada ==
No.	Name	Date of birth	L/R	Position	Height	Weight	Caps
1	Rachel Riddell	5 September 1984	R	goalkeeper			
2	Krystina Alogbo	20 January 1986	R	centre forward			
3	Sandra Lize	8 July 1977	R	driver			
4	Emily Csikos	29 July 1988	R	driver			
5	Joelle Bekhazi	27 April 1987	R	driver			
6	Katrina Monton	23 September 1987	R	driver			
7	Cora Campbell	28 May 1974	L	centre back			
8	Dominique Perreault	26 October 1984	L	driver			
9	Alison Braden	26 November 1982	L	centre back			
10	Christine Robinson	17 May 1984	R	centre forward			
11	Tara Campbell	21 July 1983	R	centre back			
12	Marina Radu	5 September 1984	R	centre back			
13	Whynter Lamarre	14 January 1979	R	goalkeeper			100

== Brazil ==
No.	Name	Date of birth	L/R	Position	Height	Weight	Caps
1	Tess Oliveira	6 January 1987	R	goalkeeper	1.65 m (5 ft 5 in)	59 kg (130 lb)	
2	Ana Carolina Vasconcelos	7 November 1981	R	centre back	1.81 m (5 ft 11 in)	76 kg (168 lb)	
3	Flavia Fernandes	13 February 1981	R	driver	1.56 m (5 ft 1 in)	50 kg (110 lb)	
4	Marina Canetti	24 January 1983	R	centre forward	1.69 m (5 ft 7 in)	62 kg (137 lb)	
5	Andrea Henriques	5 January 1980	R		1.80 m (5 ft 11 in)	67 kg (148 lb)	
6	Cecilia Canetti	16 January 1987	R	centre back	1.76 m (5 ft 9 in)	65 kg (143 lb)	
7	Amanda Oliveira						
8	Luiza Carvalho	21 July 1983	R	centre forward	1.78 m (5 ft 10 in)	80 kg (180 lb)	
9	Fernanda Lissoni	31 August 1980	R	driver	1.68 m (5 ft 6 in)	65 kg (143 lb)	
10	Camila Pedrosa-Freire	12 March 1975	R	driver	1.72 m (5 ft 8 in)	62 kg (137 lb)	
11	Viviane Costa	13 June 1980	R	centre back	1.67 m (5 ft 6 in)	56 kg (123 lb)	
12	Melina Teno	19 July 1984	R		1.77 m (5 ft 10 in)	63 kg (139 lb)	
13	Manuela Canetti	26 December 1988	R	goalkeeper	1.75 m (5 ft 9 in)	65 kg (143 lb)	

== Australia ==
No.	Name	Date of birth	L/R	Position	Height	Weight	Caps
1	Emma Knox	2 March 1978	R	goalkeeper	1.73 m (5 ft 8 in)	71 kg (157 lb)	100
2	Gemma Beadsworth	17 July 1987	R	centre forward	1.80 m (5 ft 11 in)	83 kg (183 lb)	
3	Nikita Cuffe	26 September 1979	R	centre forward	1.78 m (5 ft 10 in)	74 kg (163 lb)	118
4	Rebecca Rippon	26 December 1978	R	driver	1.67 m (5 ft 6 in)	71 kg (157 lb)	
5	Suzannah Fraser	27 September 1983	L	driver	1.75 m (5 ft 9 in)	63 kg (139 lb)	
6	Gemma Hadley						
7	Taniele Gofers	12 June 1985	R	centre forward	1.83 m (6 ft 0 in)	80 kg (180 lb)	
8	Kate Gynther	5 July 1987	R	driver	1.74 m (5 ft 9 in)	73 kg (161 lb)	
9	Bronwen Knox	16 April 1986	R	centre back	1.82 m (6 ft 0 in)		
10	Mia Santoromito	29 March 1985	R	centre back	1.69 m (5 ft 7 in)	80 kg (180 lb)	
11	Melissa Rippon	20 January 1981	R	driver	1.69 m (5 ft 7 in)	72 kg (159 lb)	
12	Amy Hetzel	27 April 1983	R	driver	1.78 m (5 ft 10 in)	70 kg (150 lb)	
13	Alicia Mccormack	7 June 1983	R	goalkeeper	1.68 m (5 ft 6 in)	78 kg (172 lb)	

== United States ==
No.	Name	Date of birth	L/R	Position	Height	Weight	Caps
1	Elizabeth Armstrong	31 January 1983	R	goalkeeper	1.85 m (6 ft 1 in)		
2	Heather Petri	13 June 1978	R	driver	1.80 m (5 ft 11 in)		
3	Ericka Lorenz	18 February 1981	R	driver	1.80 m (5 ft 11 in)		
4	Brenda Villa	18 April 1980	R	driver	1.63 m (5 ft 4 in)		
5	Lauren Wenger	11 March 1984	R	centre back	1.88 m (6 ft 2 in)		
6	Natalie Golda	28 December 1981	R	centre back	1.80 m (5 ft 11 in)		
7	Patricia Cardenas	19 August 1984	R	driver	1.68 m (5 ft 6 in)		
8	Brittany Hayes	2 February 1985	L	driver	1.70 m (5 ft 7 in)		
9	Elsie Windes	17 June 1985	R	centre back	1.78 m (5 ft 10 in)		
10	Alison Gregorka	29 June 1985	R	centre back	1.78 m (5 ft 10 in)		
11	Moriah Van Norman	30 May 1984	R	centre forward	1.78 m (5 ft 10 in)		
12	Kameryn Craig	21 July 1987	R	centre forward	1.80 m (5 ft 11 in)		
13	Jaime Hipp	1 September 1981	R	goalkeeper	1.83 m (6 ft 0 in)		

== Spain ==
No.	Name	Date of birth	L/R	Position	Height	Weight	Caps
1	Patricia Del Soto Traver	16 December 1980	L	goalkeeper			
2	Blanca Gil Sorli	19 September 1983	L				
3	Cristina Pardo Perarnau	17 June 1986	L				
4	Irene Hagen Del Poyo	8 January 1981	L	centre back			
5	Miriam Lopez-Escribano Jara	14 March 1985	L	centre forward			
6	Jennifer Pareja Lisalde	8 May 1984	L	driver			
7	Cristina Lopez Aliaga	20 October 1982	L	driver			
8	Anna Pardo Perarnau	18 November 1983	L	centre back			
9	Pilar Pena Carrasco	4 April 1986	R	centre forward			
10	Ona Meseguer Flaque	20 February 1988	R				
11	Maria Del Carmen Garcia Godoy	17 October 1990	L	centre forward			
12	Laura Lopez Ventosa						
13	Elisabeth Gazulla Blanco						

== Russia ==
No.	Name	Date of birth	L/R	Position	Height	Weight	Caps
1	Valentina Vorontsova	26 July 1982	R	goalkeeper			
2	Natalia Shepelina	24 February 1981	R				
3	Ekaterina Zubacheva	2 April 1982	R				
4	Sofya Konukh	9 March 1980	R				
5	Alena Vylegzhanina	14 August 1987	R				
6	Nadezda Glyzina	20 May 1988	R				
7	Ekaterina Pantyulina	6 October 1989	R				
8	Evgenia Soboleva	26 August 1988	R				
9	Natalia Ryzhova-Alenicheva	3 August 1987	R				
10	Olga Fomicheva	18 March 1985	R				
11	Elena Smurova	18 January 1974	R				
12	Anastasia Zubkova	3 February 1980	R				
13	Maria Kovtunovskaya	19 December 1988	R	goalkeeper			

== Puerto Rico ==
No.	Name	Date of birth	L/R	Position	Height	Weight	Caps
1	Estefania Laboy	11 August 1987	R	goalkeeper	1.63 m (5 ft 4 in)	57 kg (126 lb)	
2	Paola Medina Montero	1 December 1985	R	driver	1.68 m (5 ft 6 in)	59 kg (130 lb)	
3	Angelica J. Ortiz Irizarry	25 January 1988	R	centre back	1.80 m (5 ft 11 in)	83 kg (183 lb)	
4	Amanda J. Ortiz Irizarry	16 September 1986	R	centre forward	1.85 m (6 ft 1 in)	68 kg (150 lb)	
5	Carla M. Martinez Colomer	1 October 1986	R	driver	1.70 m (5 ft 7 in)	57 kg (126 lb)	
6	Adlin Belen Ojeda	11 June 1986	R	driver	1.65 m (5 ft 5 in)	61 kg (134 lb)	
7	Angelica Marie Garcia	10 April 1982	R	driver	1.65 m (5 ft 5 in)	63 kg (139 lb)	
8	Alejandra J. Ortiz Irizarry	29 July 1985	R	centre back	1.80 m (5 ft 11 in)	72 kg (159 lb)	
9	Mairim Rosario Lebron	15 January 1986	R	centre back	1.73 m (5 ft 8 in)	84 kg (185 lb)	
10	Anaid Ralat Nazario	8 January 1986	R	driver	1.70 m (5 ft 7 in)	61 kg (134 lb)	
11	Cristina J. Ortiz Irizarry	29 July 1985	R	centre forward	1.83 m (6 ft 0 in)	66 kg (146 lb)	
12	Francheska Beatriz Salib Lopez	18 December 1980	R	driver	1.83 m (6 ft 0 in)	66 kg (146 lb)	
13	Mirelis Arocho Salgado	7 May 1980	R	goalkeeper	1.68 m (5 ft 6 in)	88 kg (194 lb)	

== New Zealand ==
No.	Name	Date of birth	L/R	Position	Height	Weight	Caps
1	Carina Harache		R	goalkeeper			
2	Emily Cox		R	centre forward			46
3	Roberta Stewart		R	centre forward			
4	Rebecca Donoghue		R	driver			47
5	Amy Logan		R	centre back			51
6	Francesca Snell		R	centre back			29
7	Mandy Roberts		R	centre back			10
8	Rebecca McGuinness		R				45
9	Anna Sieprath		L				52
10	Kelly Mason		R				13
11	Kirsten Hudson		R				31
12	Kimberley Sumich		R	driver			
13	Olivia Colebourne		R	goalkeeper			

== Netherlands ==
No.	Name	Date of birth	L/R	Position	Height	Weight	Caps
1	Meike de Nooy	2 May 1983	R	goalkeeper	1.85 m (6 ft 1 in)	75 kg (165 lb)	
2	Yasemin Smit	21 November 1984	R	centre back	1.80 m (5 ft 11 in)	71 kg (157 lb)	
3	Meike Cabout	30 March 1986	R	driver	1.82 m (6 ft 0 in)	66 kg (146 lb)	58
4	Biurakn Hakhverdian	4 October 1985	R		1.72 m (5 ft 8 in)	68 kg (150 lb)	64
5	Jorieke Oostendorp	21 October 1981	R	centre back	1.80 m (5 ft 11 in)	75 kg (165 lb)	150
6	Danielle de Bruijn	13 February 1978	L		1.72 m (5 ft 8 in)	68 kg (150 lb)	150
7	Iefke van Belkum	22 July 1986	R	centre forward	1.85 m (6 ft 1 in)	74 kg (163 lb)	65
8	Noeki Klein	28 April 1983	R	centre forward	1.79 m (5 ft 10 in)	78 kg (172 lb)	70
9	Gillian van der Berg	8 September 1971	R	driver	1.74 m (5 ft 9 in)	65 kg (143 lb)	200
10	Alette Sijbring	20 March 1982	R	centre back	1.74 m (5 ft 9 in)	67 kg (148 lb)	100
11	Rianne Guichelaar	16 August 1983	L		1.74 m (5 ft 9 in)	63 kg (139 lb)	150
12	Simone Koot	12 November 1980	R	driver	1.73 m (5 ft 8 in)	65 kg (143 lb)	
13	Ilse van der Meijden	22 October 1988	R	goalkeeper	1.86 m (6 ft 1 in)	71 kg (157 lb)	35

== Kazakhstan ==
No.	Name	Date of birth	L/R	Position	Height	Weight	Caps
1	Alexandra Zharkova	14 June 1982	R	goalkeeper	1.70 m (5 ft 7 in)	65 kg (143 lb)	42
2	Tatyana Ponomaryova	23 February 1988	R	driver	1.77 m (5 ft 10 in)	63 kg (139 lb)	21
3	Oxana Makeyeva	5 September 1984	R		1.65 m (5 ft 5 in)	53 kg (117 lb)	36
4	Yuliya Znamenskaya	1 January 1984	R	driver	1.63 m (5 ft 4 in)	52 kg (115 lb)	36
5	Natalya Krassilnikova	2 January 1982	R	centre back	1.74 m (5 ft 9 in)	65 kg (143 lb)	46
6	Anna Zubkova	3 February 1980	R	driver	1.72 m (5 ft 8 in)	64 kg (141 lb)	62
7	Tatyana Gubina	15 December 1977	R	centre back	1.76 m (5 ft 9 in)	67 kg (148 lb)	48
8	Yekaterina Gariyeva	11 June 1981	R	centre forward	1.74 m (5 ft 9 in)	70 kg (150 lb)	39
9	Assel Jakayeva	14 March 1980	R	centre forward	1.70 m (5 ft 7 in)	65 kg (143 lb)	69
10	Marina Gritsenko	17 August 1980	R	driver	1.64 m (5 ft 5 in)	58 kg (128 lb)	45
11	Yekaterina Shishova	13 September 1978	R	centre back	1.68 m (5 ft 6 in)	56 kg (123 lb)	62
12	Irina Tolkunova	2 June 1971	R		1.74 m (5 ft 9 in)	68 kg (150 lb)	46
13	Galina Rytova	10 September 1975	R	goalkeeper	1.75 m (5 ft 9 in)	67 kg (148 lb)	68

== Italy ==
No.	Name	Date of birth	L/R	Position	Height	Weight	Caps
1	Elena Gigli	9 July 1985	R	goalkeeper	1.90 m (6 ft 3 in)	76 kg (168 lb)	
2	Martina Miceli	22 October 1973	R	centre back	1.68 m (5 ft 6 in)	65 kg (143 lb)	
3	Elisa Casanova	26 November 1973	L	centre forward	1.86 m (6 ft 1 in)	100 kg (220 lb)	
4	Silvia Bosurgi	17 April 1979	R		1.65 m (5 ft 5 in)	62 kg (137 lb)	
5	Erzsebet Valkai	6 March 1979	R	centre forward	1.76 m (5 ft 9 in)	74 kg (163 lb)	
6	Francesca Biancardi	7 June 1978	R	driver	1.77 m (5 ft 10 in)	58 kg (128 lb)	
7	Tania Di Mario	4 May 1979	R		1.67 m (5 ft 6 in)	55 kg (121 lb)	
8	Cinzia Ragusa	24 May 1977	R	centre back	1.74 m (5 ft 9 in)	72 kg (159 lb)	
9	Giulia Enrica Emmolo	16 October 1991	L		1.70 m (5 ft 7 in)	60 kg (130 lb)	
10	Martina Schiavon	20 November 1979	R	centre back	1.76 m (5 ft 9 in)	75 kg (165 lb)	
11	Maddalena Musumeci	26 March 1976	R	centre back	1.70 m (5 ft 7 in)	68 kg (150 lb)	
12	Teresa Frassinetti	24 December 1985	R	centre forward	1.76 m (5 ft 9 in)	75 kg (165 lb)	
13	Chiara Brancati	20 July 1981	R	goalkeeper	1.78 m (5 ft 10 in)	68 kg (150 lb)	

== See also ==
- Water polo at the 2007 World Aquatics Championships – Men's team rosters
