= Canetti =

Canetti is a surname. Notable people with the surname include:

- Cecilia Canetti (born 1987), Brazilian female former water polo player
- Ciça Canetti (born 1987), Brazilian female former water polo player
- Elias Canetti (1905–1994), German language author
- Jacques Canetti (1909–1997), French music executive and a talent agent
- Jean-Charles Canetti (1945–2025), Italian footballer
- Manuela Canetti (born 1988), Brazilian female water polo goalkeeper
- Marina Canetti (born 1983), Brazilian female former water polo player
- Robert Canetti (born 1948), Israeli conductor, violinist, and professor
- Veza Canetti (1897–1963), Austrian poet, playwright, and short story writer
- Yanitzia Canetti (born 1967), Cuban author, translator, and editor

== See also ==
- Canetti Peak, a 400 m peak in the Friesland Ridge, Tangra Mountains, eastern Livingston Island in the South Shetland
- Mycobacterium canettii, a novel pathogenic taxon of the Mycobacterium tuberculosis complex (MTBC)
