= Triathlon at the 2010 South American Games – Women's olympic distance =

The Women's Olympic Distance event at the 2010 South American Games was held at 12:00 on March 26.

== Individual ==
=== Medalists ===
Gold	Silver	Bronze
Barbara Catalina Diaz; Chile	Maria Carmenza Rendon; Colombia	Carolina Grimaldo Jimenez; Colombia

=== Results ===
Rank	Rider	Time
1st place, gold medalist(s)	Barbara Catalina Diaz (CHI)	2:10:46.9
2nd place, silver medalist(s)	Maria Carmenza Rendon (COL)	2:15:19.6
3rd place, bronze medalist(s)	Carolina Grimaldo Jimenez (COL)	2:16:58.5
4	Elizabeth Maria Iniguez (ECU)	2:16:58.5
5	Vanessa Gianinni (BRA)	2:18:20.4
6	Flavia Fernandes (BRA)	2:20:43.1
7	Diana MAria Montes (ECU)	2:21:09.6
8	Mayra Alejandro Vallejo (COL)	2:21:20.0
9	Andrea Nicole Contreras (CHI)	2:23:46.7
10	Romina Balena (ARG)	2:24:49.6
11	Karina Gabriela Duenas (ECU)	2:25:17.5
12	Ana Paula Aguirre (ARG)	2:25:24.8
13	Favia Alejandra Fuentes (CHI)	2:28:28.1
14	Romina Biagioli (ARG)	2:30:01.7
15	Virginia Lopez (URU)	2:30:11.8
16	Paola Marcela Lopez (COL)	2:31:15.4
17	Gisela Cocha (ARG)	2:31:18.2
18	Fernanda Bau (BRA)	2:32:49.9
	Carolina Pereira (BRA)	DNF
	Pamela Veronica de Lecco (CHI)	DNS
	Sandra Verenisse Alegre (PER)	DNS

== Team ==
=== Medalists ===
Gold	Silver	Bronze
Maria Carmenza Rendon; Carolina Grimaldo Jimenez; Mayra Alejandra Vallejo; Colombia	Barbara Catalina Diaz; Andrea Nicole Contreras; Favia Alejandra Fuentes; Chile	Elizabeth Maria Iniguez; Diana Maria Montes; Karina Gabriela Duenas; Ecuador

=== Results ===
Rank	Rider	Time
1st place, gold medalist(s)	Colombia	6:53:37
1st place, gold medalist(s)	Maria Carmenza Rendon (COL)	2:15:19
1st place, gold medalist(s)	Carolina Grimaldo Jimenez (COL)	2:16:58
1st place, gold medalist(s)	Mayra Alejandra Vallejo (COL)	2:21:20
2nd place, silver medalist(s)	Chile	7:03:00
2nd place, silver medalist(s)	Barbara Catalina Diaz (CHI)	2:10:46
2nd place, silver medalist(s)	Andrea Nicole Contreras (CHI)	2:23:46
2nd place, silver medalist(s)	Flavia Alejandra Fuentes (CHI)	2:28:28
3rd place, bronze medalist(s)	Ecuador	7:03:24
3rd place, bronze medalist(s)	Elizabeth Maria Iniguez (ECU)	2:16:58
3rd place, bronze medalist(s)	Diana Maria Montes (ECU)	2:21:09
3rd place, bronze medalist(s)	Karina Gabriel Duenas (ECU)	2:25:17
4	Brazil	7:11:52
4	Vanessa Gianinni (BRA)	2:18:20
4	Flavia Fernandes (BRA)	2:20:43
4	Fernanda Bau (BRA)	2:32:49
5	Argentina	7:20:14
5	Romina Balena (ARG)	2:24:49
5	Ana Paula Aguirre (ARG)	2:25:24
5	Romina Biagioli (ARG)	2:30:01
