= Triathlon at the 2010 South American Games – Women's sprint =

The Women's Sprint event at the 2010 South American Games was held at 9:00 on March 24.

== Individual ==
=== Medalists ===
Gold	Silver	Bronze
Barbara Catalina Diaz; Chile	Maria Carmenza Rendon; Colombia	Elizabeth Maria Iniguez; Ecuador

=== Results ===
Rank	Rider	Time
1st place, gold medalist(s)	Barbara Catalina Diaz (CHI)	1:07:11.0
2nd place, silver medalist(s)	Maria Carmenza Rendon (COL)	1:09:51.4
3rd place, bronze medalist(s)	Elizabeth Maria Iniguez (ECU)	1:10:31.6
4	Carolina Grimaldo Jimenez (COL)	1:10:46.2
5	Flavia Fernandes (BRA)	1:10:49.7
6	Mayra Alejandra Vallejo (COL)	1:10:56.7
7	Vanessa Gianinni (BRA)	1:11:20.7
8	Diana Maria Montes (ECU)	1:11:43.4
9	Flavia Alejandra Fuentes (CHI)	1:12:55.8
10	Karina Gabriel Duenas (ECU)	1:13:51.7
11	Romina Balena (ARG)	1:14:03.9
12	Carolina Pereira (BRA)	1:14:08.3
13	Paola Marcela Lopez (COL)	1:14:10.1
14	Romina Biagioli (ARG)	1:15:48.5
15	Pamela Veronica de Lecco (CHI)	1:16:01.6
16	Gisela Cocha (ARG)	1:17:25.3
17	Andrea Nicole Contreras (CHI)	1:17:43.5
18	Virginia Lopez (URU)	1:21:06.8
19	Ana Paula Aguirre (ARG)	1:23:45.5
20	Fernanda Bau (BRA)	1:31:23.0
	Sandra Verenisse Alegre (PER)	DNF

== Team ==
=== Medalists ===
Gold	Silver	Bronze
Maria Carmenza Rendon; Carolina Grimaldo Jimenez; Mayra Alejandra Vallejo; Colombia	Elizabeth Maria Iniguez; Diana Maria Montes; Karina Gabriela Duenas; Ecuador	Barbara Catalina Diaz; Favia Alejandra Fuentes; Pamela Veron de Lecco; Chile

=== Results ===
Rank	Rider	Time
1st place, gold medalist(s)	Colombia	3:31:18
1st place, gold medalist(s)	Maria Carmenza Rendon (COL)	1:09:51
1st place, gold medalist(s)	Carolina Grimaldo Jimenez (COL)	1:10:46
1st place, gold medalist(s)	Mayra Alejandra Vallejo (COL)	1:10:56
2nd place, silver medalist(s)	Ecuador	3:36:05
2nd place, silver medalist(s)	Elizabeth Maria Iniguez (ECU)	1:10:31
2nd place, silver medalist(s)	Diana Maria Montes (ECU)	1:11:43
2nd place, silver medalist(s)	Karina Gabriel Duenas (ECU)	1:13:51
3rd place, bronze medalist(s)	Chile	3:36:07
3rd place, bronze medalist(s)	Barbara Catalina Diaz (CHI)	1:07:11
3rd place, bronze medalist(s)	Flavia Alejandra Fuentes (CHI)	1:12:55
3rd place, bronze medalist(s)	Pamela Veronica de Lecco (CHI)	1:16:01
4	Brazil	3:36:17
4	Flavia Fernandes (BRA)	1:10:49
4	Vanessa Gianinni (BRA)	1:11:20
4	Carolina Pereira (BRA)	1:14:08
5	Argentina	3:47:16
5	Romina Balena (ARG)	1:14:03
5	Romina Biagioli (ARG)	1:15:48
5	Gisela Cocha (ARG)	1:17:25
