= Lissoni =

Lissoni is a surname. Notable people with the surname include:

- Fernanda Lissoni (born 1980), Brazilian water polo player
- Piero Lissoni (born 1956), Italian architect and designer
