= Kaneti =

Kaneti is both a surname and a given name. Notable people with the name include:

- Eli Kaneti (fl. 1993–2011), Israeli basketball coach
- Kaneti Mohan Rao (c. 1917–2014), Indian politician and activist

== See also ==
- Canetti
