= Mantellato =

Mantellato is a surname. Notable people with the surname include:

- Gabriela Mantellato (born 1991), Brazilian water polo player
- Josh Mantellato (born 1987), Italian rugby league player
