= 2014 FINA Women's Water Polo World League =

- League: FINA Water Polo World League
- Sport: Water Polo
- Duration: November 2013-June 2014

Super Final
- Finals champions: United States
- Runners-up: Italy

FINA Women's Water Polo World League seasons
- ← 2013 2015 →

The 2014 FINA Women's Water Polo World League is played between November 2013 and June 2014 and open to all women's water polo national teams. After participating in a preliminary round, eight teams qualify to play in a final tournament, called the Super Final in Kunshan, China from 10–15 June 2014.

In the World League, there are specific rules that do not allow matches to end in a draw. If teams are level at the end of the 4th quarter of any world league match, the match will be decided by a penalty shootout. Teams earn points in the standings in group matches as follows:

- Match won in normal time - 3 points
- Match won in shootout - 2 points
- Match lost in shootout - 1 point
- Match lost in normal time - 0 points

== Preliminary round ==
=== Europe ===
The European preliminary round consisted of two group of three teams. The winner of each group after the home and away series of games and the best 2nd placed team qualified for the Super Final. The games were played between 19 November 2013 and 22 April 2014.

==== Group A ====
Team	GP	W	L	GF	GA	GD	Pts
Spain	4	3	1	46	36	+10	9
Russia	4	2	2	54	47	+7	6
Great Britain	4	1	3	36	52	-16	3

19 November 2013	Russia	11–13	Spain	Chelyabinsk, Russia

17 December 2013	Great Britain	9–12	Russia	Manchester, Great Britain

21 January 2014	Spain	13–5	Great Britain	Barcelona, Spain

18 February 2014	Spain	13–11	Russia	Madrid, Spain

18 March 2014	Russia	20–13	Great Britain	Chelyabinsk, Russia

22 April 2014	Great Britain	9–7	Spain	Manchester, Great Britain

==== Group B ====
Team	GP	W	L	GF	GA	GD	Pts
Italy	4	3	1	43	40	+3	9
Greece	4	2	2	42	41	+1	6
Hungary	4	1	3	41	45	-4	3

19 November 2013	Greece	9–12	Italy	Athens, Greece

17 December 2013	Italy	9–7	Hungary	Catania, Italy

21 January 2014	Greece	14–11	Hungary	Athens, Greece

18 February 2014	Italy	10–9	Greece	Imperia, Italy

18 March 2014	Hungary	15–12	Italy	Budapest, Hungary

22 April 2014	Hungary	8–10	Greece	Székesfehérvár, Hungary

=== Intercontinental ===
The intercontinental tournament will feature teams from Africa, the Americas, Asia and Oceania. The teams are split into two groups, one with four teams and another group with five teams. The top four teams from this tournament will qualify for the Super Final, along with the Super Final hosts China. The games were played between 20 and 25 May in Riverside, California, United States.

==== Group A ====
Team	GP	W	L	GF	GA	GD	Pts
United States	3	3	0	42	21	+21	8
Canada	3	2	1	47	25	+22	7
Japan	3	1	2	22	39	-17	2
Kazakhstan	3	0	3	22	48	-26	1

20 May 2014	Canada	21–7	Kazakhstan	Riverside, California, United States

20 May 2014	United States	14–5	Japan	Riverside, California, United States

21 May 2014	Canada	15–6	Japan	Riverside, California, United States

21 May 2014	United States	16–5	Kazakhstan	Riverside, California, United States

22 May 2014	Kazakhstan	10–11	Japan	Riverside, California, United States

22 May 2014	Canada	11–12	United States	Riverside, California, United States

==== Group B ====
Team	GP	W	L	GF	GA	GD	Pts
Australia	3	3	0	39	16	+23	9
China	3	2	1	42	25	+17	6
Brazil	3	1	2	24	19	+5	3
Venezuela	3	0	3	8	53	-45	0

20 May 2014	Venezuela	2–12	Brazil	Riverside, California, United States

20 May 2014	Australia	13–10	China	Riverside, California, United States

21 May 2014	Venezuela	6–24	China	Riverside, California, United States

21 May 2014	Australia	9–6	Brazil	Riverside, California, United States

22 May 2014	Venezuela	0–17	Australia	Riverside, California, United States

22 May 2014	Brazil	6–8	China	Riverside, California, United States

=== Knockout stage ===
Quarterfinal
A1	United States	17
B4	Venezuela	1
A3	Japan	8
B2	China	9
A2	Canada	10
B3	Brazil	6
A4	Kazakhstan	6
B1	Australia	12

Semifinal
A1	United States	14
B2	China	10
A2	Canada	11
B1	Australia	12

Final
A1	United States	5
B1	Australia	7
Third place
B2	China	10
A2	Canada	8

==== Quarterfinals ====
23 May 2014	Canada	10–6	Brazil	Riverside, California, United States

23 May 2014	Japan	8–9	China	Riverside, California, United States

23 May 2014	United States	17–1	Venezuela	Riverside, California, United States

23 May 2014	Kazakhstan	6–12	Australia	Riverside, California, United States

==== Semifinals ====
24 May 2014	Brazil	12–11	Kazakhstan	Riverside, California, United States

24 May 2014	Japan	18–5	Venezuela	Riverside, California, United States

24 May 2014	Australia	12–11	Canada	Riverside, California, United States

24 May 2014	United States	14–10	China	Riverside, California, United States

==== 7th-place play-off ====
25 May 2014	Kazakhstan	17–9	Venezuela	Riverside, California, United States

==== 5th-place play-off ====
25 May 2014	Brazil	11–10	Japan	Riverside, California, United States

==== 3rd-place play-off ====
25 May 2014	Canada	8–10	China	Riverside, California, United States

==== Final ====
25 May 2014	Australia	7–5	United States	Riverside, California, United States

== Super Final ==
In the Super Final the eight qualifying teams are split into two groups of four teams with all teams progressing to the knock-out stage.

=== Group A ===
Team	GP	W	L	GF	GA	GD	Pts
United States	3	3	0	35	20	+15	8
Spain	3	1	2	26	29	-3	4
Canada	3	1	2	24	34	-10	3
Russia	3	1	2	38	40	-2	3

10 June 2014	Canada	5–6	Spain	Kunshan, China

10 June 2014	United States	11–10	Russia	Kunshan, China

11 June 2014	United States	16–5	Canada	Kunshan, China

11 June 2014	Spain	15–16	Russia	Kunshan, China

12 June 2014	Spain	5–8	United States	Kunshan, China

12 June 2014	Canada	14–12	Russia	Kunshan, China

=== Group B ===
Team	GP	W	L	GF	GA	GD	Pts
Italy	3	2	1	36	24	+12	9
Australia	3	2	1	36	24	+12	6
China	3	1	2	26	32	-6	3
Brazil	3	0	3	16	34	-18	0

10 June 2014	Australia	12–5	Brazil	Kunshan, China

10 June 2014	Italy	12–9	China	Kunshan, China

11 June 2014	Brazil	5–13	Italy	Kunshan, China

11 June 2014	Australia	14–8	China	Kunshan, China

12 June 2014	Italy	11–10	Australia	Kunshan, China

12 June 2014	China	9–6	Brazil	Kunshan, China

=== Knockout stage ===
Quarterfinal
A1	United States	11
B4	Brazil	1
A3	Canada	7
B2	Australia	8
A2	Spain	8
B3	China	9
A4	Russia	5
B1	Italy	6

Semifinal
A1	United States	13
B2	Australia	4
B3	China	8
B1	Italy	9

Final
A1	United States	10
B1	Italy	8
Third place
B2	Australia	7
B3	China	2

==== Quarterfinals ====
13 June 2014	Game 13	Spain	8–9	China	Kunshan, China

13 June 2014	Game 14	Canada	7–8	Australia	Kunshan, China

13 June 2014	Game 15	United States	11–1	Brazil	Kunshan, China

13 June 2014	Game 16	Russia	5–6	Italy	Kunshan, China

==== Semifinals ====
14 June 2014	Game 17	Spain	19–6	Russia	Kunshan, China

14 June 2014	Game 18	Canada	8–5	Brazil	Kunshan, China

14 June 2014	Game 19	China	8–9	Italy	Kunshan, China

14 June 2014	Game 20	Australia	4–13	United States	Kunshan, China

==== 7th-place play-off ====
15 June 2014	Game 21	Russia	8–7	Brazil	Kunshan, China

==== 5th-place play-off ====
15 June 2014	Game 22	Spain	8–7	Canada	Kunshan, China

==== 3rd-place play-off ====
15 June 2014	Game 23	China	2–7	Australia	Kunshan, China

==== Final ====
15 June 2014	Game 24	Italy	8–10	United States	Kunshan, China

=== Final ranking ===
Rank	Team
Gold medal	United States
Silver medal	Italy
Bronze medal	Australia
4	China
5	Spain
6	Canada
7	Russia
8	Brazil

2014 FINA Women's Water Polo World League

United States
Eighth title

Team Roster

Sami Hill, Alys Williams, Melissa Seidemann, Rachel Fattal, Caroline Clark, Maggie Steffens (C), Makenzie Fischer, Kiley Neushul, Jillian Kraus, Kaleigh Gilchrist, Annika Dries, Kami Craig, Elizabeth Keeve. Head coach: Adam Krikorian.
