= Miriam Lopez-Escribano =

Spanish water polo player (born 1988)

Personal information
- Born: 13 January 1988 (age 38) Madrid, Spain
Medal record
Women's Water polo
Representing Spain
European Championships
Silver medal – second place	2008 Malaga	Team

Miriam Lopez-Escribano (born January 13, 1988) is a Spanish water polo player. She played for the Spain women's national water polo team.

She participated at the 2007 World Aquatics Championships, 2008 Women's European Water Polo Championship, 2009 World Aquatics Championships.
