= Joop Cabout =

Dutch water polo player (1927–2013)

Personal information
- Full name: Johannes Cabout
- Nationality: Netherlands
- Born: 28 October 1927 Gouda, the Netherlands
- Died: 10 October 2013 (aged 85)

Sport
- Sport: Water polo

Senior clubs
- Years: Team
- –: GZC
- –: Gouda
National team
- Years: Team
- ?-?: Netherlands

Johannes "Joop" Cabout (28 October 1927 – 10 October 2013) was a Dutch male water polo player. He was a member of the Netherlands men's national water polo team. He was part of the 1948 Olympic team, that won the bronze medal, as a reserve. He competed for the team at the 1949 Trofeo Italia and 1950 European Championships where the team won the gold medal. He competed with the team at the 1952 Summer Olympics. The Dutch team was heavily favored for a medal, but were eliminated after a controversial match against Yugoslavia. During his whole career he played for the water polo club GZC in Gouda. Cabout won the Dutch title in 1954 and 1957 with the team.

He passed on his love for water polo to his son, Martin Cabout, and his grandchildren. Four granddaughters played at a national level, and Mieke Cabout, Jantien Cabout and Harriët Cabout made it into the Dutch national team. At the 2008 Summer Olympics, Mieke Cabout won a gold medal.
