= Willem Bokhoven =

Dutch water polo player (1901–1982)

Personal information
- Full name: Willem Cornelis Bokhoven
- Nationality: Netherlands
- Born: 4 February 1901 Gouda, the Netherlands
- Died: 19 May 1982 (aged 81) Huizen, the Netherlands

Sport
- Sport: Water polo

Senior clubs
- Years: Team
- –: GZC, Gouda
National team
- Years: Team
- ?-?: Netherlands

Willem Cornelis Bokhoven (4 February 1901 – 19 May 1982) was a Dutch water polo player. He was a member of the Netherlands men's national water polo team. He competed with the team at the 1924 Summer Olympics.
