= Oxana Makeyeva =

Personal information
- Born: September 5, 1984 (age 40)

Sport
- Sport: Water polo

Oxana Makeyeva (born 5 September 1984) is a Kazakhstani water polo player. She was a member of the Kazakhstan women's national water polo team.

Makeyeva competed at the 2007 World Aquatics Championships.
