= Tatyana Ponomaryova =

Personal information
- Born: February 23, 1988 (age 37)

Sport
- Sport: Water polo

Tatyana Ponomaryova (born 23 February 1988) is a Kazakhstani female water polo player. She was a member of the Kazakhstan women's national water polo team.

She was a part of the team at the World Championships, most recently at the 2007 World Aquatics Championships.
