= Helen Dacre =

British scientist and athlete

Medal record

Women's water polo

Representing United Kingdom

World Championships

Helen Dacre is a British scientist and athlete. She is currently professor of dynamical meteorology at the University of Reading. Her work on modelling and predicting the path of the Eyjafjallajökull volcanic ash plume was pivotal in the reopening of European airspace in a timely manner. She has previously represented Great Britain in water polo at the European, Commonwealth and World Championships.

== Sporting career ==
Dacre represented Great Britain at a number of international water polo competitions. At the 2003 World Aquatics Championships in Barcelona, Dacre was a regular fixture in the GB line up.

== Research career ==
Dacre's research focuses on the development of extratropical cyclones, pollution transport through the atmosphere and volcanic ash dispersion. Her cyclone tracking algorithms are in widespread operational use.

Dacre's volcanic ash dispersion model is central to the Met Office aviation safety forecasts. Following the 2010 eruption of Iceland's Eyjafjallajökull volcano, European airspace was closed with a cost to the global airline industry an estimated $200 million per day Dacre's assessment of the accuracy of ash models is credited with reducing airspace closure times, in particular reducing the economic impact of the 2011 Grímsvötn eruption.
