= Yuliya Znamenskaya =

Kazakhstani water polo player

Personal information
- Born: January 1, 1984 (age 41)

Sport
- Sport: Water polo

Yuliya Znamenskaya (born 1 January 1984) is a Kazakhstani female water polo player. She was a member of the Kazakhstan women's national water polo team, playing as a driver.

She competed at the 2007 World Aquatics Championships.
