= Rubi Palmieri =

Brazilian water polo player

Personal information
- Born: October 6, 1983 (age 42)
Medal record
Women's water polo
Representing Brazil
Pan American Games
Bronze medal – third place	2003 Santo Domingo	Team

Rubi Lira Miranda Palmieri (born October 6, 1983 in São Paulo) is a female water polo player from Brazil, who won the bronze medal with the Brazil women's national water polo team at the 2003 Pan American Games. She played in an attacking position in the national squad.
