= Anna Pardo =

Spanish water polo player (born 1983)

Personal information
- Nationality: Spanish
- Born: Anna Pardo Perarnau; 18 November 1983 (age 42) Barcelona, Spain
- Height: 5 ft 11 in (180 cm)

Sport
- Country: Spain
- Sport: Water polo
- College team: USC Trojans
- Club: CN Mediterrani
Medal record
European Championships
Silver medal – second place	2008 Malaga

Anna Pardo Perarnau (born 18 November 1983) is a former Spanish water polo player who won the silver medal at the 2008 European Championship held in Málaga, Spain. She competed at the 2003 World Aquatics Championships, 2005 World Aquatics Championships, and 2007 World Aquatics Championships.

== College career ==
Pardo attended University of Southern California, playing on the women's water polo team from 2003 to 2005. As a freshman, she scored a team-high three goals in an 8–7 overtime win against Stanford in the MPSF Championship match. In May 2004 she won the NCAA by defeating Loyola Marymount 10–8.
