= Ciça Canetti =

Brazilian water polo player

Personal information
- Born: January 16, 1987 (age 38); Rio de Janeiro, Brazil

Sport
- Sport: Water polo

Cecília ("Ciça") Canetti (born January 16, 1987) is a female water polo player from Brazil, who finished in fourth place with the Brazil women's national water polo team at the 2007 Pan American Games. She also competed at the 2007 World Aquatics Championships, finishing in tenth place.
