= Cristina Beer =

Brazilian water polo player (born 1980)

Personal information
- Born: 22 November 1980 (age 45) São Paulo, Brazil
- Height: 1.65 m (5 ft 5 in)
- Weight: 58 kg (128 lb)
Medal record
Women's water polo
Representing Brazil
Pan American Games
Bronze medal – third place	1999 Winnipeg	Team
Bronze medal – third place	2011 Guadalajara	Team

Cristina Beer (born 22 November 1980) is a Brazilian water polo player.

She played with the Brazil women's national water polo team at the 2011 World Aquatics Championships.
