= Mariana Roriz =

Brazilian water polo player

Personal information
- Born: October 3, 1980 (age 45)
Medal record
Women's water polo
Representing Brazil
Pan American Games
Bronze medal – third place	1999 Winnipeg	Team
Bronze medal – third place	2003 Santo Domingo	Team

Mariana Tonetti Roriz (born October 3, 1980 in São Paulo) is a female water polo player from Brazil, who twice won the bronze medal with the Brazil women's national water polo team at the Pan American Games: 1999 and 2003.
