= Eszter Tomaskovics =

Hungarian water polo player (born 1987)

Personal information
- Full name: Eszter Anita Tomaskovics
- Nationality: Hungarian
- Born: 23 August 1987 (age 39)

Sport
- Sport: Water polo
- Handedness: right

Senior clubs
- Years: Team
- ?–2005 2005–2008 2008–2010: Vasas; Honvéd; Olympiacos
National team
- Years: Team
- ?-?: Hungary
Medal record
Women's water polo
Representing Hungary
World Championships
Gold medal – first place	2005 Montréal	Team
European Championships
Bronze medal – third place	2006 Belgrade	Team

Eszter Anita Tomaskovics (born 23 August 1987) is a Hungarian water polo player. She was a member of the Hungary women's national team. She was a part of the Hungarian team that claimed the gold medal at the 2005 FINA World Championship in Montreal, Quebec, Canada. She also competed in the 2007 and 2009 FINA World Championships. At club level, she has played most notably for Vasas, Honvéd (2005–2008) and Olympiacos (2008–2010), winning numerous titles.

== See also ==
- List of world champions in women's water polo
- List of World Aquatics Championships medalists in water polo
