= Ana Vasconcelos =

Brazilian water polo player

Personal information
- Full name: Ana Carolina Vasconcelos
- Born: November 7, 1981 (age 44) Brasília, DF, Brazil
Medal record
Women's water polo
Representing Brazil
Pan American Games
Bronze medal – third place	2003 Santo Domingo	Team

Ana Carolina Vasconcelos (born November 7, 1981) is a female water polo player from Brazil, who won the bronze medal with the Brazil women's national water polo team at the 2003 Pan American Games. She also competed at the 2007 Pan American Games, finishing in fourth place.
