= Amanda Oliveira =

Brazilian water polo player

Personal information
- Born: 6 January 1987 (age 39) Paris, France

Sport
- Sport: Water polo
Medal record
Representing Brazil
Pan American Games
Bronze medal – third place	2011 Guadalajara	Team
Bronze medal – third place	2015 Toronto	Team

Catherine Amanda Badocco Helene de Oliveira (born 6 January 1987) is a female water polo player from Brazil, who finished in fourth place with the Brazil women's national water polo team at the 2007 Pan American Games in Rio de Janeiro, Brazil.

Oliveira also competed at the 2007 World Aquatics Championships, finishing in tenth place. Her twin sister and goalkeeper Tess played in the same team.
