= Maria Cecília Marques =

Brazilian water polo player

Personal information
- Born: May 5, 1976 (age 50)
Medal record
Women's water polo
Representing Brazil
Pan American Games
Bronze medal – third place	2003 Santo Domingo	Team

Maria Cecília Marques (born May 5, 1976 in Rio de Janeiro) is a female water polo player from Brazil, who won the bronze medal with the Brazil women's national water polo team at the 2003 Pan American Games. She played in a defending role in the national squad.
