= Cláudia Graner =

Brazilian water polo player

Personal information
- Born: January 14, 1974 (age 52)
- Height: 1.71 m (5 ft 7 in)
- Weight: 64 kg (141 lb)
Medal record
Women's water polo
Representing Brazil
Pan American Games
Bronze medal – third place	1999 Winnipeg	Team
Bronze medal – third place	2003 Santo Domingo	Team

Cláudia Graner (born January 14, 1974, in São Paulo) is a female water polo goalkeeper from Brazil, who won the bronze medal with the Brazil women's national water polo team at the 1999 Pan American Games, and 2003 Pan American Games.

She also competed at the 2003 World Aquatics Championships,
