= 2015 FINA Women's Water Polo World League =

The 2015 FINA Women's Water Polo World League is played between November 2014 and June 2015 and open to all women's water polo national teams. After participating in a preliminary round, eight teams qualify to play in a final tournament, called the Super Final in Shanghai, China from 09–14 June 2015.

In the world league, there are specific rules that do not allow matches to end in a draw. If teams are level at the end of the 4th quarter of any world league match, the match will be decided by a penalty shootout. Teams earn points in the standings in group matches as follows:

- Match won in normal time - 3 points
- Match won in shootout - 2 points
- Match lost in shootout - 1 point
- Match lost in normal time - 0 points

== Europe ==
=== Preliminary round ===
The European preliminary round consisted of two group of four teams. The winner of each group after the home and away series of games qualified for the Super Final.

==== Group A ====
Team	GP	W	L	GF	GA	GD	Pts
Italy	6	5	1	68	44	+24	15
Russia	6	4	2	76	51	+25	11
Hungary	6	3	3	70	57	+13	10
France	6	0	6	25	87	-62	0

25 Nov 2014; 18:30	Game 1	Russia	13 (4)–11 (5) (OT)	Hungary	Zlatoust, Russia
25 Nov 2014; 18:30	Game 1	Score by quarters: 3–3, 1–2, 2–1, 3–3 OT: 4–2			Zlatoust, Russia

25 Nov 2014; 20:30	Game 2	Italy	12 (5)–5 (1)	France	Frosinone, Italy
25 Nov 2014; 20:30	Game 2	Score by quarters: 2–1, 3–0, 2–2, 5–2			Frosinone, Italy

16 Dec 2014; 18:00	Game 3	Hungary	9 (6)–11 (5)	Italy	Szentes, Hungary
16 Dec 2014; 18:00	Game 3	Score by quarters: 5–2, 1–3, 1–3, 2–3			Szentes, Hungary

16 Dec 2014; 20:30	Game 4	France	4 (2)–15 (6)	Russia	Montreuil, France
16 Dec 2014; 20:30	Game 4	Score by quarters: 1–5, 1–1, 1–4, 1–5			Montreuil, France

27 Jan 2015; 18:00	Game 5	Russia	11 (7)–8 (6)	Italy	Kirishi, Russia
27 Jan 2015; 18:00	Game 5	Score by quarters: 3–1, 4–5, 3–1, 1–1			Kirishi, Russia

27 Jan 2015; 18:30	Game 6	Hungary	14 (5)–5 (2)	France	Győr, Hungary
27 Jan 2015; 18:30	Game 6	Score by quarters: 3–2, 2–0, 4–2, 5–1			Győr, Hungary

24 Feb 2015; 18:30	Game 7	Hungary	13 (7)–12 (8)	Russia	Kecskemét, Hungary
24 Feb 2015; 18:30	Game 7	Score by quarters: 4–3, 3–5, 5–2, 1–2			Kecskemét, Hungary

24 Feb 2015; 20:30	Game 8	France	3 (0)–14 (8)	Italy	Lille, France
24 Feb 2015; 20:30	Game 8	Score by quarters: 0–3, 0–5, 2–4, 1–2			Lille, France

24 Mar 2015; 18:30	Game 9	Russia	18 (10)–4 (3)	France	Astrakhan, Russia
24 Mar 2015; 18:30	Game 9	Score by quarters: 5–2, 5–1, 4–0, 4–1			Astrakhan, Russia

24 Mar 2015; 20:00	Game 10	Italy	12 (5)–9 (2)	Hungary	Imperia, Italy
24 Mar 2015; 20:00	Game 10	Score by quarters: 2–1, 3–1, 4–3, 3–4			Imperia, Italy

21 Apr 2015; 19:00	Game 11	France	4 (2)–14 (7)	Hungary	Nice, France
21 Apr 2015; 19:00	Game 11	Score by quarters: 0–3, 2–4, 1–3, 1–4			Nice, France

21 Apr 2015; 20:00	Game 12	Italy	11 (5)–7 (4)	Russia	Avezzano, Italy
21 Apr 2015; 20:00	Game 12	Score by quarters: 3–3, 2–1, 2–1, 4–2			Avezzano, Italy

==== Group B ====
Team	GP	W	L	GF	GA	GD	Pts
Netherlands	6	5	1	98	45	+53	15
Spain	6	4	2	76	46	+30	12
Greece	6	3	3	76	56	+20	9
Germany	6	0	6	33	136	-103	0

25 Nov 2014; 18:00	Game 1	Greece	11 (5)–12 (6)	Netherlands	Athens, Greece
25 Nov 2014; 18:00	Game 1	Score by quarters: 3–2, 2–4, 5–3, 1–3			Athens, Greece

25 Nov 2014; 20:45	Game 2	Spain	18 (8)–6 (2)	Germany	Barcelona, Spain
25 Nov 2014; 20:45	Game 2	Score by quarters: 4–2, 4–0, 7–3, 3–1			Barcelona, Spain

16 Dec 2014; 19:30	Game 3	Germany	7 (6)–20 (12)	Greece	Krefeld, Germany
16 Dec 2014; 19:30	Game 3	Score by quarters: 3–6, 3–6, 1–3, 0–5			Krefeld, Germany

16 Dec 2014; 20:30	Game 4	Netherlands	10 (6)–6 (3)	Spain	Utrecht, Netherlands
16 Dec 2014; 20:30	Game 4	Score by quarters: 2–2, 4–1, 2–2, 2–1			Utrecht, Netherlands

27 Jan 2015; 19:00	Game 5	Greece	10 (4)–7 (4)	Spain	Athens, Greece
27 Jan 2015; 19:00	Game 5	Score by quarters: 1–0, 3–4, 3–1, 3–2			Athens, Greece

27 Jan 2015; 19:30	Game 6	Netherlands	30 (16)–4 (1)	Germany	Drachten, Netherlands
27 Jan 2015; 19:30	Game 6	Score by quarters: 8–1, 8–0, 7–2, 7–1			Drachten, Netherlands

24 Feb 2015; 19:00	Game 7	Germany	3 (2)–22 (12)	Spain	Chemnitz, Germany
24 Feb 2015; 19:00	Game 7	Score by quarters: 0–5, 2–7, 0–6, 1–4			Chemnitz, Germany

24 Feb 2015; 19:30	Game 8	Netherlands	13 (8)–5 (1)	Greece	Gouda, Netherlands
24 Feb 2015; 19:30	Game 8	Score by quarters: 4–0, 4–1, 2–1, 3–3			Gouda, Netherlands

24 Mar 2015; 19:00	Game 9	Greece	21 (10)–5 (2)	Germany	Athens, Greece
24 Mar 2015; 19:00	Game 9	Score by quarters: 6–1, 4–1, 5–3, 6–0			Athens, Greece

24 Mar 2015; 19:00	Game 10	Spain	11 (6)–8 (3)	Netherlands	Madrid, Spain
24 Mar 2015; 19:00	Game 10	Score by quarters: 4–1, 2–2, 4–3, 1–2			Madrid, Spain

21 Apr 2015; 19:30	Game 11	Germany	8 (4)–25 (12)	Netherlands	Hamburg, Germany
21 Apr 2015; 19:30	Game 11	Score by quarters: 3–7, 1–5, 1–7, 3–6			Hamburg, Germany

28 Apr 2015; 20:00	Game 12	Spain	12 (6)–9 (6)	Greece	Barcelona, Spain
28 Apr 2015; 20:00	Game 12	Score by quarters: 3–2, 3–4, 2–0, 4–3			Barcelona, Spain

== Intercontinental Qualification Tournament ==
=== Preliminary round ===
==== Group A ====
Team	GP	W	L	GF	GA	GD	Pts
United States	3	3	0	32	12	+20	9
China	3	2	1	30	28	+2	5
Kazakhstan	3	1	2	24	39	-15	2
Brazil	3	0	3	29	36	-7	2

28 Apr 2015; 16:30	Game 1	Brazil	4 (3)–9 (3)	United States	Auckland, New Zealand
28 Apr 2015; 16:30	Game 1	Score by quarters: 1–1, 2–2, 0–5, 1–1			Auckland, New Zealand

28 Apr 2015; 18:00	Game 2	China	13 (7)–6 (3)	Kazakhstan	Auckland, New Zealand
28 Apr 2015; 18:00	Game 2	Score by quarters: 5–2, 2–1, 2–1, 4–2			Auckland, New Zealand

29 Apr 2015; 15:00	Game 3	China	2 (2)–8 (2)	United States	Auckland, New Zealand
29 Apr 2015; 15:00	Game 3	Score by quarters: 1–2, 1–0, 0–0, 0–6			Auckland, New Zealand

29 Apr 2015; 18:00	Game 4	Brazil	11 (4)–12 (4) (OT)	Kazakhstan	Auckland, New Zealand
29 Apr 2015; 18:00	Game 4	Score by quarters: 2–3, 2–1, 2–3, 2–1 OT: 3–4			Auckland, New Zealand

30 Apr 2015; 15:00	Game 5	Brazil	14 (4)–15 (7) (OT)	China	Auckland, New Zealand
30 Apr 2015; 15:00	Game 5	Score by quarters: 2–4, 2–3, 4–1, 1–1 OT: 5–6			Auckland, New Zealand

30 Apr 2015; 18:00	Game 6	United States	15 (8)–6 (3)	Kazakhstan	Auckland, New Zealand
30 Apr 2015; 18:00	Game 6	Score by quarters: 3–1, 5–2, 2–1, 5–2			Auckland, New Zealand

==== Group B ====
Team	GP	W	L	GF	GA	GD	Pts
Australia	3	3	0	32	12	+20	9
Canada	3	2	1	34	25	+9	6
New Zealand	3	1	2	17	29	-12	3
Japan	3	0	3	23	40	-17	0

28 Apr 2015; 15:00	Game 1	Japan	6 (3)–17 (8)	Australia	Auckland, New Zealand
28 Apr 2015; 15:00	Game 1	Score by quarters: 1–3, 2–5, 2–4, 1–5			Auckland, New Zealand

28 Apr 2015; 19:30	Game 2	New Zealand	7 (1)–15 (7)	Canada	Auckland, New Zealand
28 Apr 2015; 19:30	Game 2	Score by quarters: 1–2, 0–5, 3–4, 3–4			Auckland, New Zealand

29 Apr 2015; 16:30	Game 3	Japan	13 (6)–15 (9)	Canada	Auckland, New Zealand
29 Apr 2015; 16:30	Game 3	Score by quarters: 3–6, 3–3, 4–5, 3–1			Auckland, New Zealand

29 Apr 2015; 19:30	Game 4	New Zealand	2 (3)–10 (8)	Australia	Auckland, New Zealand
29 Apr 2015; 19:30	Game 4	Score by quarters: 2–3, 0–5, 0–1, 0–1			Auckland, New Zealand

30 Apr 2015; 16:30	Game 5	Australia	5 (4)–4 (2)	Canada	Auckland, New Zealand
30 Apr 2015; 16:30	Game 5	Score by quarters: 3–1, 1–1, 0–2, 1–0			Auckland, New Zealand

30 Apr 2015; 19:30	Game 6	Japan	4 (1)–8 (3)	New Zealand	Auckland, New Zealand
30 Apr 2015; 19:30	Game 6	Score by quarters: 0–1, 1–2, 1–1, 2–4			Auckland, New Zealand

=== Knockout stage ===
Quarterfinals
A2	China	14
B3	New Zealand	6
A4	Brazil	4
B1	Australia	17
A3	Kazakhstan	3
B2	Canada	11
A1	United States	17
B4	Japan	0

Semifinals
A2	China	6
B1	Australia	13
B2	Canada	9
A1	United States	11

Final
B1	Australia	10
A1	United States*	12
Third place
A2	China	7
B2	Canada	9

==== Quarterfinals ====
1 May 2015; 15:00	Game 1	Kazakhstan	3 (0)–11 (6)	Canada	Auckland, New Zealand
1 May 2015; 15:00	Game 1	Score by quarters: 0–2, 0–4, 2–2, 1–3			Auckland, New Zealand

1 May 2015; 16:30	Game 2	United States	17 (12)–0 (0)	Japan	Auckland, New Zealand
1 May 2015; 16:30	Game 2	Score by quarters: 4–0, 8–0, 2–0, 3–0			Auckland, New Zealand

1 May 2015; 18:00	Game 3	Brazil	4 (3)–17 (10)	Australia	Auckland, New Zealand
1 May 2015; 18:00	Game 3	Score by quarters: 1–4, 2–6, 1–2, 0–5			Auckland, New Zealand

1 May 2015; 19:30	Game 4	China	14 (5)–6 (3)	New Zealand	Auckland, New Zealand
1 May 2015; 19:30	Game 4	Score by quarters: 2–3, 3–0, 5–2, 4–1			Auckland, New Zealand

==== Semifinals ====
2 May 2015; 18:00	Game 1	China	6 (3)–13 (8)	Australia	Auckland, New Zealand
2 May 2015; 18:00	Game 1	Score by quarters: 2–5, 1–3, 1–2, 2–3			Auckland, New Zealand

2 May 2015; 19:30	Game 2	Canada	9 (4)–11 (7)	United States	Auckland, New Zealand
2 May 2015; 19:30	Game 2	Score by quarters: 3–4, 1–3, 0–1, 5–3			Auckland, New Zealand

==== 3rd Place ====
3 May 2015; 18:00	Game 1	China	7 (3)–9 (2)	Canada	Auckland, New Zealand
3 May 2015; 18:00	Game 1	Score by quarters: 2–0, 1–2, 1–4, 3–3			Auckland, New Zealand

==== Final ====
3 May 2015; 19:30	Game 1	Australia	10 (5)–12 (5) (OT)	United States	Auckland, New Zealand
3 May 2015; 19:30	Game 1	Score by quarters: 3–3, 2–2, 2–3, 1–0 OT: 2–4			Auckland, New Zealand

=== 5th-8th Places ===
5th–8th Places Semifinals
New Zealand	10
Brazil*	12
Kazakhstan	8
Japan	7

5th Place
Brazil	7
Kazakhstan	4
7th Place
New Zealand	13
Japan	10

==== 5th-8th Places Semifinals ====
2 May 2015; 15:00	Game 1	New Zealand	10 (3)–12 (6) (OT)	Brazil	Auckland, New Zealand
2 May 2015; 15:00	Game 1	Score by quarters: 1–2, 2–4, 1–1, 5–2 OT: 1–3			Auckland, New Zealand

2 May 2015; 16:30	Game 2	Kazakhstan	8 (2)–7 (3)	Japan	Auckland, New Zealand
2 May 2015; 16:30	Game 2	Score by quarters: 1–2, 1–1, 4–2, 2–2			Auckland, New Zealand

==== 7th Place ====
3 May 2015; 15:00	Game 1	New Zealand	13 (6)–10 (6)	Japan	Auckland, New Zealand
3 May 2015; 15:00	Game 1	Score by quarters: 3–1, 3–5, 5–3, 2–1			Auckland, New Zealand

==== 5th Place ====
3 May 2015; 16:30	Game 1	Brazil	7 (2)–4 (2)	Kazakhstan	Auckland, New Zealand
3 May 2015; 16:30	Game 1	Score by quarters: 1–2, 1–0, 2–1, 3–1			Auckland, New Zealand

== Super Final ==
In the Super Final the eight qualifying teams are split into two groups of four teams with all teams progressing to the knock-out stage. The games were played in Shanghai, China from 9 to 14 June 2015.

=== Preliminary round ===
==== Group A ====
Team	GP	W	L	GF	GA	GD	Pts
Australia	3	3	0	27	16	+11	9
Italy	3	2	1	32	26	+6	6
China	3	1	2	20	29	-9	3
Russia	3	0	3	23	31	-8	0

9 June 2015; 17:40	Game 1	Australia	8 (5)–4 (3)	Russia	Shanghai, China
9 June 2015; 17:40	Game 1	Score by quarters: 3–3, 2–0, 1–0, 2–1			Shanghai, China

9 June 2015; 19:30	Game 2	Italy	11 (4)–6 (3)	China	Shanghai, China
9 June 2015; 19:30	Game 2	Score by quarters: 2–2, 2–1, 5–2, 2–1			Shanghai, China

10 June 2015; 16:20	Game 3	Italy	14 (10)–12 (8)	Russia	Shanghai, China
10 June 2015; 16:20	Game 3	Score by quarters: 5–3, 5–5, 4–1, 0–3			Shanghai, China

10 June 2015; 19:00	Game 4	Australia	11 (6)–5 (3)	China	Shanghai, China
10 June 2015; 19:00	Game 4	Score by quarters: 4–1, 2–2, 4–0, 1–2			Shanghai, China

11 June 2015; 16:20	Game 5	Italy	7 (4)–8 (4)	Australia	Shanghai, China
11 June 2015; 16:20	Game 5	Score by quarters: 3–2, 1–2, 2–2, 1–2			Shanghai, China

11 June 2015; 19:00	Game 6	China	9 (4)–7 (3)	Russia	Shanghai, China
11 June 2015; 19:00	Game 6	Score by quarters: 3–1, 1–2, 3–3, 2–1			Shanghai, China

==== Group B ====
Team	GP	W	L	GF	GA	GD	Pts
United States	3	3	0	33	9	+24	9
Canada	3	2	1	29	31	-2	5
Netherlands	3	1	2	30	28	+2	4
Brazil	3	0	3	16	40	-24	0

9 June 2015; 15:00	Game 1	Netherlands	14 (4)–15 (3) (OT)	Canada	Shanghai, China
9 June 2015; 15:00	Game 1	Score by quarters: 3–0, 1–3, 2–3, 3–3 OT: 5–6 (penalties)			Shanghai, China

9 June 2015; 16:20	Game 2	United States	16 (9)–3 (1)	Brazil	Shanghai, China
9 June 2015; 16:20	Game 2	Score by quarters: 4–1, 5–0, 4–0, 3–2			Shanghai, China

10 June 2015; 15:00	Game 3	Netherlands	13 (5)–5 (2)	Brazil	Shanghai, China
10 June 2015; 15:00	Game 3	Score by quarters: 1–2, 4–0, 4–2, 4–1			Shanghai, China

10 June 2015; 17:40	Game 4	United States	9 (4)–3 (2)	Canada	Shanghai, China
10 June 2015; 17:40	Game 4	Score by quarters: 2–1, 2–1, 3–1, 2–0			Shanghai, China

11 June 2015; 15:00	Game 5	Netherlands	3 (1)–8 (3)	United States	Shanghai, China
11 June 2015; 15:00	Game 5	Score by quarters: 1–2, 0–1, 1–2, 1–3			Shanghai, China

11 June 2015; 17:40	Game 6	Canada	11 (9)–8 (4)	Brazil	Shanghai, China
11 June 2015; 17:40	Game 6	Score by quarters: 5–1, 4–3, 2–2, 0–2			Shanghai, China

=== Knockout stage ===
Quarterfinals
A2	Italy	7
B3	Netherlands	8
A4	Russia	6
B1	United States	17
A3	China	6
B2	Canada	5
A1	Australia	17
B4	Brazil	8

Semifinals
B3	Netherlands	5
B1	United States	8
A3	China	3
A1	Australia	5

Final
B1	United States	8
A1	Australia	7
Third place
B3	Netherlands	10
A3	China	5

==== Quarterfinals ====
12 June 2015; 15:00	Game 1	Italy	7 (4)–8 (6)	Netherlands	Shanghai, China
12 June 2015; 15:00	Game 1	Score by quarters: 2–3, 2–3, 1–1, 2–1			Shanghai, China

12 June 2015; 16:20	Game 2	Australia	17 (8)–8 (3)	Brazil	Shanghai, China
12 June 2015; 16:20	Game 2	Score by quarters: 4–1, 4–2, 6–4, 3–1			Shanghai, China

12 June 2015; 17:40	Game 3	Russia	6 (0)–17 (8)	United States	Shanghai, China
12 June 2015; 17:40	Game 3	Score by quarters: 0–4, 0–4, 3–5, 3–4			Shanghai, China

12 June 2015; 19:00	Game 4	China	6 (3)–5 (2)	Canada	Shanghai, China
12 June 2015; 19:00	Game 4	Score by quarters: 2–0, 1–2, 2–2, 1–1			Shanghai, China

=== 5th-8th Places ===
5th–8th Places Semifinals
Italy	11
Russia	13
Canada	8
Brazil	6

5th Place
Russia	16
Canada	8
7th Place
Italy	11
Brazil	2

==== 5th-8th Places Semifinals ====
13 June 2015; 15:00	Game 1	Italy	11 (2)–13 (4) (OT)	Russia	Shanghai, China
13 June 2015; 15:00	Game 1	Score by quarters: 1–2, 1–2, 4–1, 3–4 OT: 2–4 (penalties)			Shanghai, China

13 June 2015; 16:20	Game 2	Canada	8 (4)–6 (4)	Brazil	Shanghai, China
13 June 2015; 16:20	Game 2	Score by quarters: 3–1, 1–3, 4–1, 0–1			Shanghai, China

==== 7th Place ====
14 June 2015; 14:30	Game 1	Italy	11 (3)–2 (0)	Brazil	Shanghai, China
14 June 2015; 14:30	Game 1	Score by quarters: 0–0, 3–0, 2–1, 6–1			Shanghai, China

==== 5th Place ====
14 June 2015; 16:00	Game 1	Russia	16 (6)–8 (5)	Canada	Shanghai, China
14 June 2015; 16:00	Game 1	Score by quarters: 2–1, 4–4, 7–1, 3–2			Shanghai, China

=== Finals ===
Semifinals
Netherlands	5
United States	8
China	3
Australia	5

Final
United States	8
Australia	7
3rd Place
Netherlands	10
China	5

==== Semifinals ====
13 June 2015; 17:40	Game 1	Netherlands	5 (2)–8 (5)	United States	Shanghai, China
13 June 2015; 17:40	Game 1	Score by quarters: 1–2, 1–3, 0–3, 3–0			Shanghai, China

13 June 2015; 19:00	Game 2	China	3 (1)–5 (4)	Australia	Shanghai, China
13 June 2015; 19:00	Game 2	Score by quarters: 1–3, 0–1, 1–1, 1–0			Shanghai, China

==== 3rd Place ====
14 June 2015; 17:30	Game 1	Netherlands	10 (4)–5 (4)	China	Shanghai, China
14 June 2015; 17:30	Game 1	Score by quarters: 1–1, 3–3, 3–0, 3–1			Shanghai, China

==== Final ====
14 June 2015; 19:00	Game 1	United States	8 (7)–7 (5)	Australia	Shanghai, China
14 June 2015; 19:00	Game 1	Score by quarters: 6–2, 1–3, 0–0, 1–2			Shanghai, China

=== Final ranking ===
Rank	Team
Gold medal	United States
Silver medal	Australia
Bronze medal	Netherlands
4	China
5	Russia
6	Canada
7	Italy
8	Brazil

2015 FINA Women's Water Polo World League

United States
Ninth title

Team Roster

Sami Hill, Maddie Musselman, Melissa Seidemann, Rachel Fattal, Caroline Clark, Maggie Steffens (C), Courtney Mathewson, Kiley Neushul, Ashley Grossman, Kaleigh Gilchrist, Makenzie Fischer, Kami Craig, Ashleigh Johnson. Head coach: Adam Krikorian.
