= Mayla Siracusa =

Brazilian water polo player

Personal information
- Born: May 21, 1980 (age 46)
Medal record
Women's water polo
Representing Brazil
Pan American Games
| Bronze medal – third place | 2003 Santo Domingo | Team |

Mayla Siracusa (born May 21, 1980, in São Paulo) is a female water polo player from Brazil, who won the bronze medal with the Brazil women's national water polo team at the 2003 Pan American Games. She played in an attacking role in the national squad.
