= Jantien Cabout =

Dutch water polo player (born 1988)

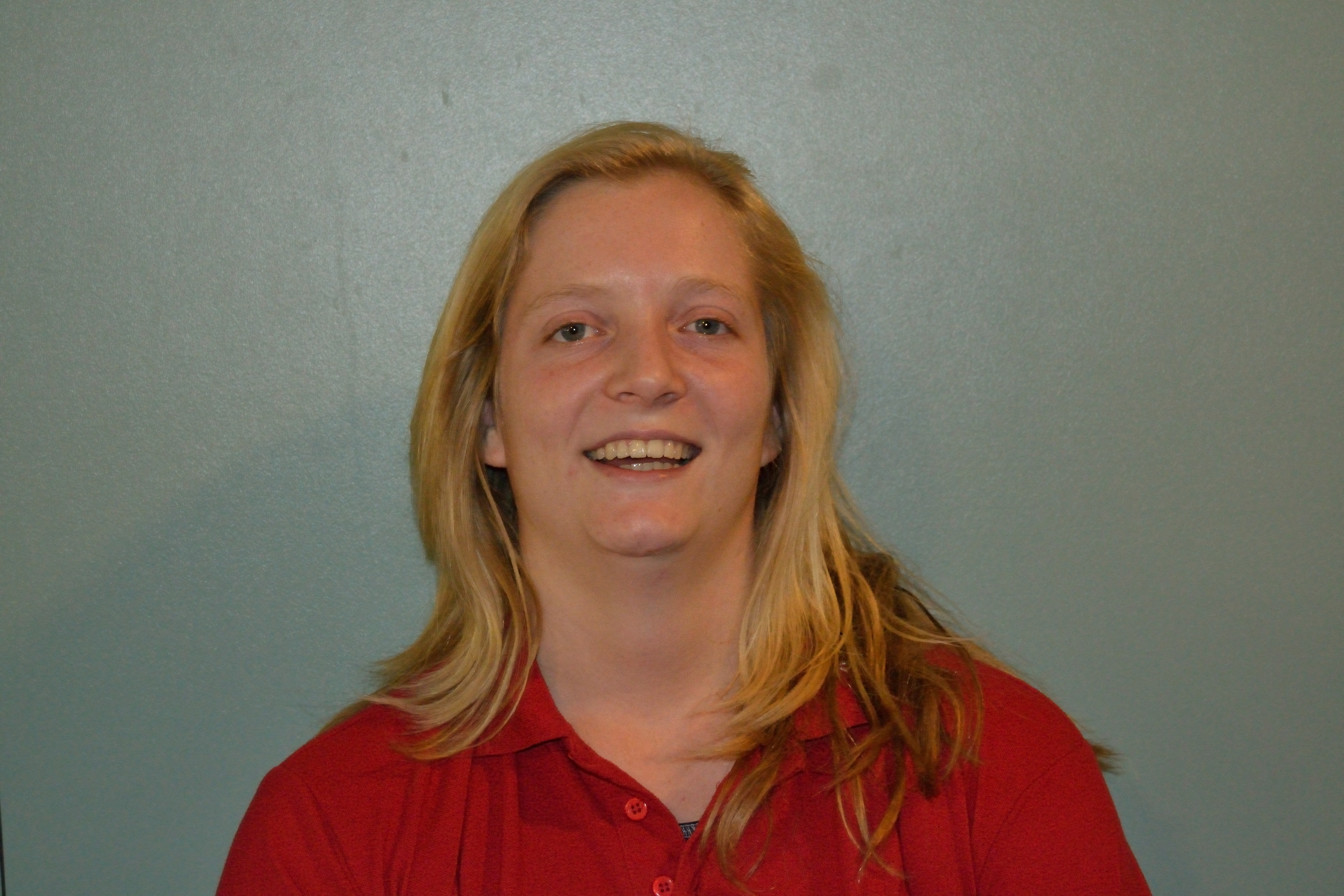

Personal information
- Nationality: Dutch
- Born: January 10, 1988 (age 38)
- Height: 172 cm (68 in)
- Weight: 69 kg (152 lb)

Sport
- Sport: Water polo
National team
- Years: Team
- 2011: Netherlands

Jantien Cabout (born 10 January 1988) is a Dutch water polo player.

She was part of the Dutch team at the 2011 World Aquatics Championships,

Her sisters Mieke Cabout and Harriët Cabout and her grandfather Joop Cabout also played water polo for the national team.

== See also ==
- Netherlands at the 2011 World Aquatics Championships
