= Fruzsina Brávik =

Hungarian water polo player (born 1986)

Personal information
- Nationality: Hungarian
- Born: 6 October 1986 (age 40) Dunaújváros, Hungary
- Height: 1.81 m (5 ft 11 in)
- Weight: 83 kg (183 lb)

Sport
- Sport: Water polo
- Position: Driver

Senior clubs
- Years: Team
- ?-?: Dove Dunaújváros
National team
- Years: Team
- ?-?: Hungary
Medal record
Representing Hungary
World Championships
Gold medal – first place	2005 Montreal	Team competition

Fruzsina Brávik (born 6 October 1986) is a Hungarian water polo player. She was a member of the Hungary women's national water polo team, playing as a driver. She was a part of the team at the 2008 Summer Olympics. On club level she played for Dove Dunaújváros in Hungary.

== See also ==
- List of world champions in women's water polo
- List of World Aquatics Championships medalists in water polo
