= Brazil women's national water polo team =

Brazil
- FINA code: BRA
- Association: Brazilian Confederation of Aquatic Sports (CBDA)
- Confederation: UANA (Americas)
- Head coach: Paulo Rocha
- Asst coach: Janaína Grossi; Rafael Hall

FINA ranking (since 2008)
- Highest: 8 (2016)

Olympic Games
- Appearances: 1 (first in 2016)
- Best result: 8th (2016)

World Championship
- Appearances: 14 (first in 1991)
- Best result: 8th place (1991)

World Cup
- Appearances: 1 (first in 1991)
- Best result: 8th place (1991)

World League
- Appearances: 8 (first in 2005)
- Best result: 8th place (2014, 2015, 2016)

Pan American Games
- Appearances: 7 (first in 1999)
- Best result: (bronze) (1999, 2003, 2011, 2015, 2019, 2023)

UANA Cup (ASUA Cup)
- Best result: (silver) (2011, 2013, 2015)
Medal record
Pan American Games
Bronze medal – third place	1999 Winnipeg	Team
Bronze medal – third place	2003 Santo Domingo	Team
Bronze medal – third place	2011 Guadalajara	Team
Bronze medal – third place	2015 Toronto	Team
Bronze medal – third place	2019 Lima	Team
Bronze medal – third place	2023 Santiago	Team

The Brazil women's national water polo team represents Brazil in international women's water polo competitions and friendly matches.

== Results ==
=== Olympic Games ===
Games	Round	Position	Pld	W	D	L	GF	GA	GD
(Australia) 2000 Sydney	did not qualify								
(Greece) 2004 Athens	did not qualify								
(China) 2008 Beijing	did not qualify								
(United Kingdom) 2012 London	did not qualify								
(Brazil) 2016 Rio de Janeiro	Quarter-finals	8th of 8	4	0	0	4	16	46	-30
(Japan) 2020 Tokyo	did not qualify								
(France) 2024 Paris	did not qualify								
Total	1/7		4	0	0	4	16	46	-30

=== World Championship ===
Year	Round	Position	Pld	W	D	L	GF	GA	GD
(Spain) 1986	did not enter								
(Australia) 1991	Classification 5th-8th	8th of 8	4	0	0	4	16	46	-30
(Italy) 1994	Classification 9th-12th	9th of 12	7	2	0	5	48	69	-21
(Australia) 1998	Classification 9th-12th	10th of 12	8	2	2	4	49	66	-17
(Japan) 2001	Classification 9th-12th	10th of 12	8	2	1	5	42	63	-21
(Spain) 2003	Classification 9th-12th	12th of 16	6	1	0	5	23	48	-25
(Canada) 2005	Classification 13th-16th	13th of 16	5	2	1	2	38	27	+11
(Australia) 2007	Classification 9th-12th	10th of 16	6	2	0	4	44	50	-6
(Italy) 2009	Classification 13th-16th	13th of 16	5	1	2	2	48	44	-6
(China) 2011	Classification 13th-16th	14th of 16	5	1	0	4	31	56	-25
(Spain) 2013	Round of 16	14th of 16	4	0	0	4	19	56	-37
(Russia) 2015	Classification 9th-12th	10th of 16	6	2	0	4	44	73	-29
(Hungary) 2017	Classification 13th-16th	14th of 16	5	1	0	4	33	61	-28
(South Korea) 2019	did not enter								
(Hungary) 2022	Classification 13th-16th	14th of 16	5	1	0	4	38	56	-18
(Japan) 2023	did not enter								
(Qatar) 2024	Classification 13th-16th	15th of 16	5	1	1	3	46	77	-31
Total	14/17		79	18	7	54	519	792	-273

=== World Cup ===
Year	Round	Position	Pld	W	D	L	GF	GA	GD
1979	did not enter								
1980	did not enter								
1981	did not enter								
1983	did not enter								
1984	did not enter								
1988	did not enter								
1989	did not enter								
1991	Classification 5th-8th	8th	5	0	0	5	24	89	-65
1993	did not enter								
1995	did not enter								
1997	did not enter								
1999	did not enter								
2002	did not enter								
2006	did not enter								
2010	did not enter								
2014	did not enter								
2018	did not enter								
2023	did not enter								
Total	1/18		5	0	0	5	24	89	-65

=== World League ===
Year	Round	Position	Pld	W	D	L	GF	GA	GD
2004	did not enter								
2005	Preliminary Round	10th	10	1	0	9	34	86	-52
2006	Semi Final	8th	7	2	0	5	46	83	-37
2007	did not enter								
2008	did not enter								
2009	did not enter								
2010	Preliminary Round	16th	6	0	0	6	39	64	-25
2011	did not enter								
2012	Preliminary Round	14th	4	0	0	4	11	65	-54
2013	Preliminary Round	-	4	0	0	4	8	47	-39
2014	Super Final	8th	12	3	0	9	82	111	-29
2015	Super Final	8th	12	2	0	10	84	143	-59
2016	Super Final	8th	12	2	0	10	63	148	-85
2017	did not enter								
2018	did not enter								
2019	did not enter								
2020	did not enter								
2022	Intercontinental Cup	-	6	3	0	3	54	65	-11
Total	8/18		73	13	0	60	421	812	-391

=== Pan American Games ===
Games	Round	Position	Pld	W	D	L	GF	GA	GD
(Canada) 1999 Winnipeg	Bronze medal match	3rd place, bronze medalist(s)	6	4	0	2	55	33	+22
(Dominican Republic) 2003 Santo Domingo	Bronze medal match	3rd place, bronze medalist(s)	6	2	1	3	28	44	-16
(Brazil) 2007 Rio de Janeiro	Bronze medal match	4th	7	3	0	4	52	42	+10
(Mexico) 2011 Guadalajara	Bronze medal match	3rd place, bronze medalist(s)	5	3	0	2	32	42	-10
(Canada) 2015 Toronto	Bronze medal match	3rd place, bronze medalist(s)	5	3	1	1	54	40	+14
(Peru) 2019 Lima	Bronze medal match	3rd place, bronze medalist(s)	6	4	0	2	57	61	-4
(Chile) 2023 Santiago	Bronze medal match	3rd place, bronze medalist(s)	6	4	0	2	79	74	+5
Total	7/7		41	23	2	16	357	336	+21

=== UANA Cup (ASUA Cup) ===
- 2011 – (silver) Silver medal
- 2013 – (silver) Silver medal
- 2015 – (silver) Silver medal
- 2019 – (bronze) Bronze medal
- 2023 – (silver) Silver medal

=== Olympic Year Tournament ===
- 1996 – 12th place

== Team ==
=== Current squad ===
Squad for the 2024 World Championships.

Head coach: Paulo Rocha

- 1 Isabela Souza GK
- 2 Yandra Ramos FP
- 3 Luana Bonetti FP
- 4 Karen Silva FP
- 5 Stefany Azevedo FP
- 6 Jennifer Cavalcante FP
- 7 Samantha Ferreira FP
- 8 Debora Silva FP
- 9 Letícia Belorio FP
- 10 Rebecca Moreir FP
- 11 Mirella Coutinho FP
- 12 Maiah Nascimento FP
- 13 Hemanuelle Scalabrin GK
- 14 Ana Vasconcelos FP

=== Former squads ===
- 1999 Pan American Games – Bronze Medal
  - Ana Monteiro, Antonella Bertolucci, Camila Pedrosa, Cláudia Graner, Cristiana Pinciroli, Cristina Beer, Mariana Fleury, Mariana Secches, Mariana Roriz, Mariangela Corrêa, and Raquel Maizza.
- 2003 World Championship – 12th place
  - Marina Canetti, Viviane Costa, Flávia Fernandes, Cláudia Graner, Andréa Henriques, Mayla Siracusa, Maria Marques, Tess Oliveira, Rubi Palmieri, Camila Pedrosa, Mariana Resstom, Mariana Roriz, and Melina Teno. Head Coach: David Hart.
- 2003 Pan American Games – Bronze Medal
  - Viviane Costa, Andréa Henriques, Camila Pedrosa, Cláudia Graner, Flávia Fernandes, Mariana Roriz, Maria Marques, Marina Canetti, Mayla Siracusa, Melina Teno, Tess Oliveira, Rubi Palmieri, and Ana Vasconcelos.
- 2005 World Championship – 10th place
  - Ciça Canetti, Manuela Canetti, Marina Canetti, Luiza Carvalho, Viviane Costa, Flávia Fernandes, Andréa Henriques, Fernanda Lissoni, Amanda Oliveira, Tess Oliveira, Camila Pedrosa, Melina Teno, and Ana Vasconcelos.
- 2007 World Championship – 10th place
  - Ciça Canetti, Manuela Canetti, Marina Canetti, Luiza Carvalho, Viviane Costa, Flávia Fernandes, Andréa Henriques, Fernanda Lissoni, Amanda Oliveira, Tess Oliveira, Camila Pedrosa, Melina Teno, and Ana Vasconcelos. Head Coach: Roberto Ghiappini.
- 2007 Pan American Games – 4th place
  - Amanda Oliveira, Maria Bárbara Amaro, Ana Vasconcelos, Andréa Henriques, Camila Pedrosa, Ciça Canetti, Fernanda Lissoni, Flávia Fernandes, Luiza Carvalho, Manuela Canetti, Marina Canetti, Melina Teno, and Tess Oliveira.
- 2008 FINA Olympic Qualifying Tournament – 11th place
  - Tess Oliveira, Luiza Jordi, Flávia Fernandes, Marina Canetti, Marina Zablith, Carolina Melo, Amanda Oliveira, Luiza Carvalho, Fernanda Lissoni, Flavia Vinha, Maria Bárbara Amaro, Gabriela Mantelato, and Cláudia Graner. Head Coach: Roberto Chiappini.
- 2011 Pan American Games – Bronze Medal
  - Tess Oliveira, Ciça Canetti, Marina Zablith, Marina Canetti, Catherine de Oliveira, Izabella Chiappini, Cristina Beer, Luiza Carvalho, Fernanda Lissoni, Gabriela Gozani, Mirela Coutinho, Gabriela Dias, and Manuela Canetti.
- 2015 Pan American Games – Bronze Medal
  - Tess Oliveira, Marina Zablith, Izabella Chiappini, Catherine Oliveira, Luiza Carvalho, Mirella Coutinho, Gabriela Dias, Diana Abla, Marina Canetti, Lucianne Maia, Melani Dias, Viviane Bahia, and Victoria Chamorro. Head Coach: Patrick Oaten

== Under-20 team ==
Brazil lastly competed at the 2021 FINA Junior Water Polo World Championships.

== See also ==
- Brazil men's national water polo team
