= Mieke Cabout =

Dutch water polo player (born 1986)

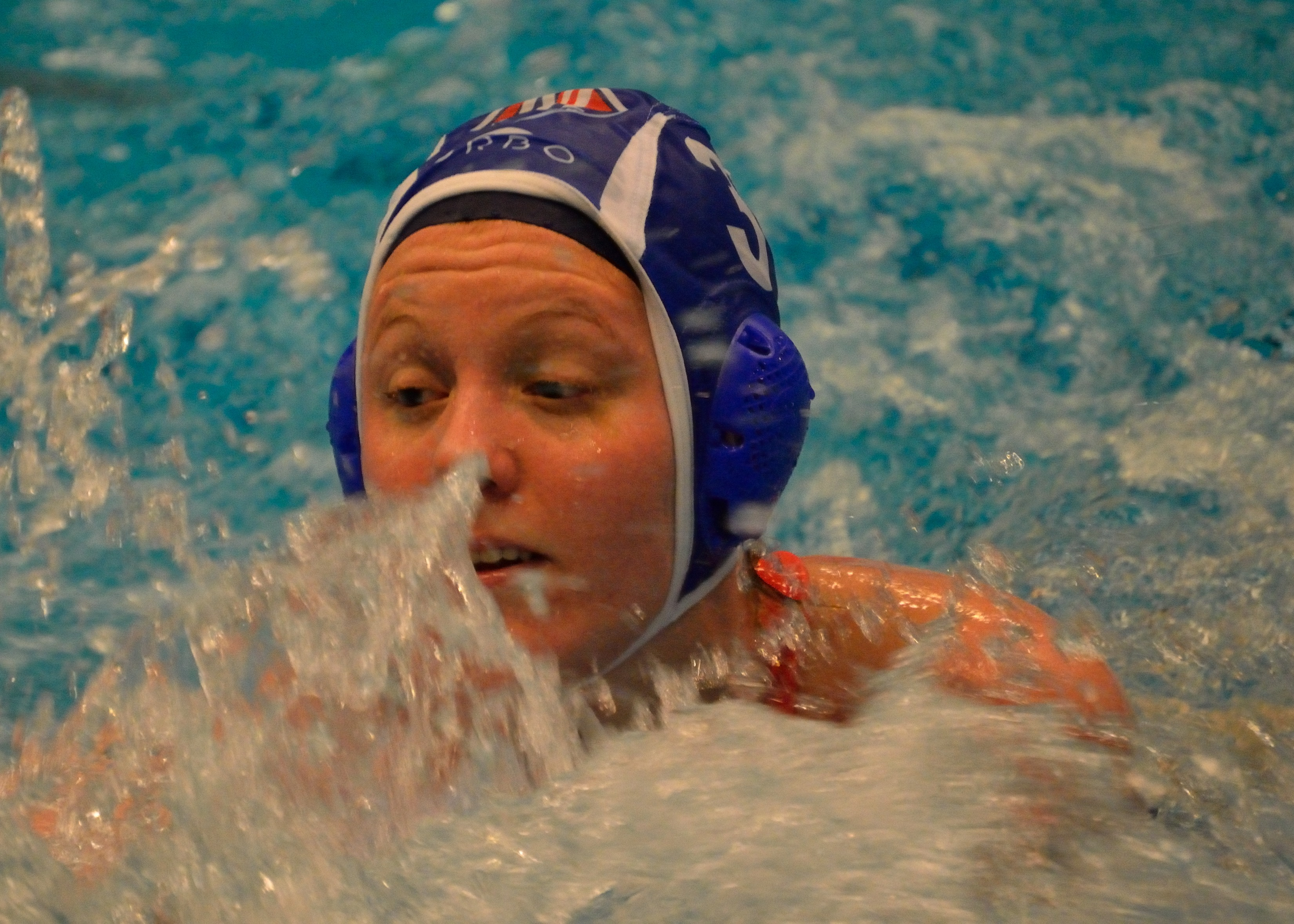
- Cabout in 2012

Personal information
- Full name: Frederike Jacobie Cabout
- Born: 30 March 1986 (age 40) Gouda, Netherlands
- Height: 182 cm (6 ft 0 in)
- Weight: 70 kg (154 lb)
Medal record
Women's water polo
Representing the Netherlands
Olympic Games
Gold medal – first place	2008 Beijing	Team competition
European Championships
Bronze medal – third place	2010 Zagreb	Team competition

Frederike Jacobie "Mieke" Cabout (born 30 March 1986) is a water polo player of the Netherlands who represents the Dutch national team in international competitions.

Cabout was part of the team that finished 10th at the 2005 World Aquatics Championships in Montreal, Quebec, Canada. At the 2006 FINA Women's Water Polo World League in Cosenza and the 2006 Women's European Water Polo Championship in Belgrade they finished in fifth place, followed by the 9th spot at the 2007 World Aquatics Championships in Melbourne. They started a new campaign with a mix of experienced and talented players to work towards a new top team for the 2012 Summer Olympics in London. The Dutch team finished in fifth place at the 2008 Women's European Water Polo Championship in Málaga and they qualified for the 2008 Summer Olympics in Beijing. There they ended up winning the gold medal on 21 August, beating the United States 9–8 in the final.

Her sisters Harriët Cabout and Jantien Cabout and her grandfather Joop Cabout also played water polo for the national team.

== See also ==
- Netherlands women's Olympic water polo team records and statistics
- List of Olympic champions in women's water polo
- List of Olympic medalists in water polo (women)
