= Carolina Pereira =

Portuguese documentary filmmaker, writer, podcast host and public commentator

Carolina Salgueiro Pereira
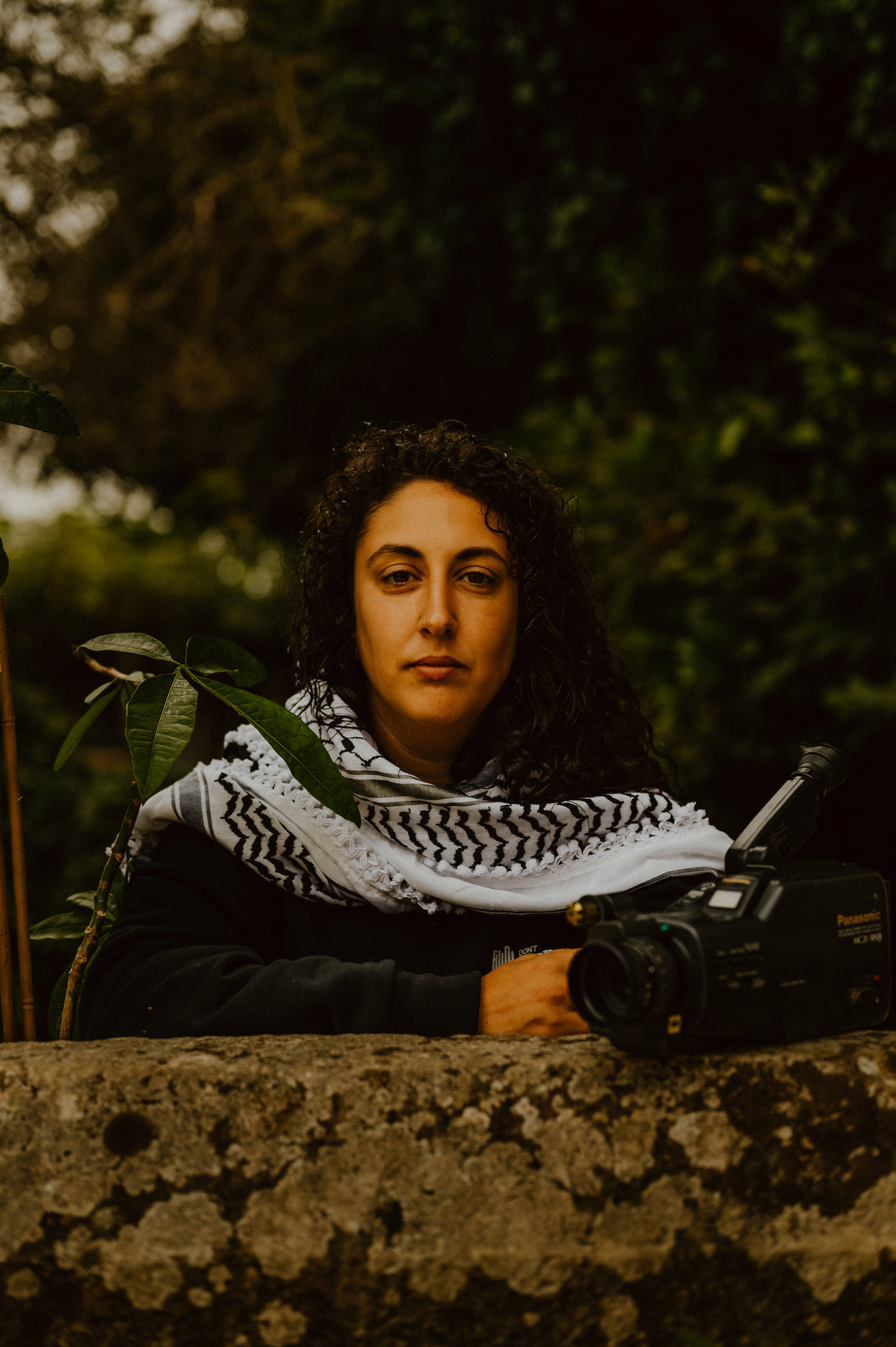
- Occupation: Documentarian

Carolina Pereira (also known as Carolina Salgueiro Pereira) is a Portuguese documentary filmmaker, writer, podcast host, and public commentator whose work focuses on ethical storytelling, political analysis, and human rights. Her practice addresses themes such as Palestine, displacement, migration, humanitarian ethics, and gender equality. She is the founder and creative director of Don’t Skip Humanity, an independent media and storytelling platform.

== Career ==
She is also the founder and creative director of Don’t Skip Humanity, an organisation dedicated to ethical storytelling, human rights advocacy, and documentary production.

Pereira is a published cronista (columnist) in Portuguese media. Her opinion pieces and essays have appeared in Público, Gerador, and Comunidade Cultura e Arte, where she writes on political resistance, colonial legacies, humanitarian practices, gender equality, and international solidarity. Pereira has appeared as a commentator and interviewee on Portuguese national television, including CNN Portugal.

== Documentary Film ==
=== Free Fish ===
Pereira is the co-director and producer of Free Fish, a Portuguese–Palestinian short documentary co-directed with Palestinian filmmaker Bisan Owda.The film focuses on everyday life in Gaza and seeks to humanise statistical narratives of war through personal stories.

=== What We Carried ===
Pereira filmed What We Carried entirely with a mobile phone, which focuses on displacement, memory, and women’s lived experiences.
