= Cecilia Canetti =

Brazilian water polo player

Personal information
- Nationality: Brazilian
- Born: 16 January 1987 (age 39)
- Height: 1.76 m (5 ft 9 in)
- Weight: 63 kg (139 lb)

Sport
- Sport: Water polo
- Handedness: right
- Number: 2
National team
- Years: Team
- 2011: Brazil
Medal record
Representing Brazil
Pan American Games
Bronze medal – third place	2011 Guadalajara	Team competition

Cecilia Canetti (born 16 January 1987) is a Brazilian former water polo player. She was part of the Brazil women's national water polo team.

She competed at the 2011 World Aquatics Championships. She won a bronze medal at the 2011 Pan American Games. She played for Long Beach State University.
