= GZC =

GZC may refer to:

- GZC, Pinyin code for Guangzhou Higher Education Mega Center railway station, China
- GZC, station code for Zichem railway station, a railway station in Belgium
- GZC, abbreviation for Goudsche Zwemclub, predecessor to Dutch water polo club GZC Donk
