= David Hart (water polo) =

Canadian water polo player (born 1951)

Personal information
- Born: December 6, 1951 (age 73); Hamilton, Ontario, Canada

Sport
- Sport: Water polo

David Hart (born December 6, 1951) is a 4-time Olympian in the sport of water polo who is still active as a mentor and coach. He competed as an athlete for the Canadian men's national water polo team at the 1972 Summer Olympics, 1976 Summer Olympics, and as an assistant coach at the 1984 Summer Olympics, placing 16th, 9th, and 10th, respectively. He also served as assistant coach for the Canadian women's national water polo team placing 5th at the 2000 Summer Olympics. An inductee in the McMaster University Hall of Fame, Ontario Aquatic Hall of Fame, Hamilton Sports Hall of Fame, he has also received life-time achievement recognition from the Coaching Association of Canada, Ottawa Sports Awards, Hamilton Sport Banner Series, Hamilton People of Significance Award and Aquatics Canada.

David was the first ever Canadian water polo personality to coach a foreign team as head coach of the Brazilian Women's Team 2002-2003. He won 8 international medals as a coach, competing in 5 World Championships and 6 Pan American Games. Numerous innovative programs were created by David during a career spanning 1965 to 2022 including: Canadian Water Polo League/Canadian Water Polo Dream Team/I Love Water Polo program. He launched his own David Hart Performance Water Polo business in June 2018. He currently lives in Griffith, Ontario, Canada.
