= Viviane Costa =

Brazilian water polo player

Viviane
Personal information
- Full name: Viviane Filellini Costa Feital
- Born: June 13, 1980 (age 46) Brazil
Medal record
Women's water polo
Representing Brazil
Pan American Games
Bronze medal – third place	2003 Santo Domingo	Team

Viviane Filellini Costa (born June 13, 1980 in São Paulo) is a female water polo player from Brazil, who won the bronze medal with the Brazil women's national water polo team at the 2003 Pan American Games. She played in an attacking position in the national squad.
