= Gabriela Mantellato Dias =

Brazilian water polo player

Personal information
- Nickname: Gabi
- Born: 28 October 1991 (age 34) São Paulo, Brazil
- Height: 1.75 m (5 ft 9 in)
- Weight: 84 kg (185 lb)

Sport
- Sport: Water polo
- Handedness: right
- Number: 12
National team
- Years: Team
- 2011: Brazil
Medal record
Women's water polo
Representing Brazil
Pan American Games
Bronze medal – third place	2011 Guadalajara	Team
Bronze medal – third place	2015 Toronto	Team
Bronze medal – third place	2019 Lima	Team

Gabriela Mantellato Dias (born 28 October 1991) is a water polo player of Brazil. She competed at the 2011 World Aquatics Championships, 2015 Pan American Games, and won a bronze medal at the 2011 Pan American Games.

She was part of the Brazilian team at the 2015 World Aquatics Championships. She won bronze medals at the 2011 and 2015 Pan American Games. She participated at the 2016 Summer Olympics.

== See also ==
- Brazil at the 2015 World Aquatics Championships
