= Anna Zubkova =

Kazakhstani water polo player

Personal information
- Native name: Анна Викторовна Зубкова
- Full name: Anna Viktorovna Zubkova
- Born: 3 February 1980 (age 46) Chelyabinsk, Soviet Union

Sport
- Sport: Water polo
Medal record
Representing Kazakhstan
Asian Games
Silver medal – second place	2010 Guangzhou	Team competition
- Updated on 19 August 2015

Anna Viktorovna Zubkova (Анна Викторовна зубкова; born 3 February 1980) is a former water polo player of Kazakhstan. She was a part of the national team at the 2004 Summer Olympics. She was part of the Kazakhstani team at the 2013 World Aquatics Championships in Barcelona, Spain.

She is the twin sister of water polo player Anastasia Zubkova, who competed for the Russian national team at the 2004 Olympics.

== See also ==
- Kazakhstan at the 2013 World Aquatics Championships
