= Tess Oliveira =

Brazilian water polo player

Personal information
- Born: January 6, 1987 (age 39) Paris, France
Medal record
Women's water polo
Representing Brazil
Pan American Games
Bronze medal – third place	2003 Santo Domingo	Team
Bronze medal – third place	2011 Guadalajara	Team
Bronze medal – third place	2015 Toronto	Team

Tess Flore Badocco Helene de Oliveira (born January 6, 1987, in Paris) is a female water polo goalkeeper from Brazil, who won the bronze medal with the Brazil women's national water polo team at the 2003 Pan American Games.

Oliveira also competed at the 2007 Pan American Games, finishing in fourth place. Her twin sister Amanda played in the same team.

== See also ==
- List of women's Olympic water polo tournament goalkeepers
