= Fernanda Lissoni =

Brazilian water polo player

Personal information
- Born: August 31, 1980 (age 45) São Paulo, Brazil

Sport
- Sport: Water polo
Medal record
Representing Brazil
Pan American Games
Bronze medal – third place	2011 Guadalajara	Team competition

Fernanda Palma Lissoni (born August 31, 1980) is a female water polo player from Brazil, who finished in fourth place with the Brazil women's national water polo team at the 2007 Pan American Games in Rio de Janeiro, Brazil. She also competed at the 2007 World Aquatics Championships, finishing in tenth place.
