= Luíza Carvalho =

Brazilian water polo player

Luiza Carvalho
Personal information
- Full name: Luíza Ávila Carvalho
- Born: 2 July 1983 (age 42) Brazil
- Height: 183 cm (6 ft 0 in)
- Weight: 77 kg (170 lb)

Sport
- Sport: water polo
Medal record
Representing Brazil
Pan American Games
| Bronze medal – third place | 2011 Guadalajara | Team competition |
| Bronze medal – third place | 2015 Toronto | Team competition |
- Updated on 19 August 2015

Luíza Ávila Carvalho also written as Luisa Carvalho (born 2 July 1983) is a female water polo player of Brazil.

She was part of the Brazilian team at World Championships, most recently at the 2015 World Aquatics Championships. She won a bronze medal at the 2011 Pan American Games.

== See also ==
- Brazil at the 2015 World Aquatics Championships
