= Camila Pedrosa =

Brazilian water polo player

Personal information
- Born: 12 March 1975 (age 51)
Medal record
Women's water polo
Representing Brazil
Pan American Games
Bronze medal – third place	1999 Winnipeg	Team
Bronze medal – third place	2003 Santo Domingo	Team

Camila Hermeto Pedrosa-Freire (born March 12, 1975, in São Paulo) is a female water polo player from Brazil, who twice won a bronze medal with the Brazil women's national water polo team at the Pan American Games: 1999 and 2003. She also competed at the 2007 Pan American Games, finishing in fourth place.

At club level, Pedrosa played in Greece most notably for ANO Glyfada and Olympiacos. She won the 1999–00 LEN Champions Cup with Glyfada. In 2004–05 season, she played for Olympiacos in the Greek League and the LEN Trophy.
