= Marina Canetti =

Brazilian water polo player

Personal information
- Born: January 24, 1983 (age 43) Rio de Janeiro, Brazil
Medal record
Women's water polo
Representing Brazil
Pan American Games
Bronze medal – third place	2003 Santo Domingo	Team
Bronze medal – third place	2011 Guadalajara	Team
Bronze medal – third place	2015 Toronto	Team

Marina Canetti (born January 24, 1983, in Rio de Janeiro) is a female water polo player from Brazil, who won the bronze medal with the Brazil women's national water polo team at the 2003 Pan American Games. She also competed at the 2007 Pan American Games, finishing in fourth place, and the 2011 World Aquatics Championships.
