= Flávia Fernandes =

Brazilian water polo player

Personal information
- Born: February 13, 1981 (age 45)
Medal record
Women's water polo
Representing Brazil
Pan American Games
Bronze medal – third place	2003 Santo Domingo	Team

Flávia Alvarenga Fernandes (born February 13, 1981, in Goiânia) is a female water polo player from Brazil, who won the bronze medal with the Brazil women's national water polo team at the 2003 Pan American Games. She also competed at the 2007 Pan American Games, finishing in fourth place.
