= 2010 Women's European Water Polo Championship squads =

This article shows all participating team squads at the 2010 Women's European Water Polo Championship, held in Croatia from 31 August to 10 September 2010.

== Croatia ==
No.	Name	Date of birth	Position	L/R	Height	Weight	2010 club
1	Natasa Andelic	13 February 1988		R	1.81 m (5 ft 11 in)	70 kg (150 lb)	ZVK Mladost Zagreb
2	Emmi Miljkovic	2 September 1988		R	1.74 m (5 ft 9 in)	66 kg (146 lb)	Primorje Rijeka
3	Aida Sehic	30 August 1987		R	1.70 m (5 ft 7 in)	75 kg (165 lb)	ZVK Mladost Zagreb
4	Blaise Stanicic	21 March 1987		R	1.69 m (5 ft 7 in)	68 kg (150 lb)	ZVK Mladost Zagreb
5	Josipa Supraha	9 June 1991		R	1.72 m (5 ft 8 in)	65 kg (143 lb)	Bura
6	Mia Simunic	28 September 1983		R	1.73 m (5 ft 8 in)	58 kg (128 lb)	ZVK Mladost Zagreb
7	Anamarija Reic-Kranjac	3 July 1987		R	1.78 m (5 ft 10 in)	71 kg (157 lb)	ZVK Mladost Zagreb
8	Karmela Tvrdic	16 July 1992		R	1.72 m (5 ft 8 in)	64 kg (141 lb)	Bura
9	Maja Kalauz	10 May 1992		R	1.78 m (5 ft 10 in)	63 kg (139 lb)	Primorje Rijeka
10	Lucija Drobac	19 December 1985		R	1.69 m (5 ft 7 in)	63 kg (139 lb)	ZVK Mladost Zagreb
11	Majda Zekan	30 August 1988		R	1.73 m (5 ft 8 in)	59 kg (130 lb)	Primorje Rijeka
12	Ana Gavran	4 June 1984		R	1.80 m (5 ft 11 in)	69 kg (152 lb)	ZVK Mladost Zagreb
13	Andrea Artukovich	17 March 1990		R		66 kg (146 lb)	ZVK Mladost Zagreb

== Germany ==
No.	Name	Date of birth	Position	L/R	Height	Weight	2010 club
1	Hanna Hanholz	17 November 1987		R	1.82 m (6 ft 0 in)	66 kg (146 lb)	SV Blau-Weiß Bochum
2	Lina Rohe	18 May 1984		R	1.80 m (5 ft 11 in)	70 kg (150 lb)	SV Blau-Weiß Bochum
3	Tatjana Steinhauer	23 April 1991		L	1.81 m (5 ft 11 in)	79 kg (174 lb)	Hannoverscher SV 1892
4	Mariam Salloum	23 August 1989		R	1.65 m (5 ft 5 in)	72 kg (159 lb)	SG Neukoelln Berlin
5	Katrin Dierolf	6 February 1979		R	1.75 m (5 ft 9 in)	73 kg (161 lb)	SV Blau-Weiß Bochum
6	Claudia Blomenkamp	30 December 1986		R	1.80 m (5 ft 11 in)	84 kg (185 lb)	SV Bayer Uerdingen 08
7	Monika Kruszona	4 August 1985		L	1.80 m (5 ft 11 in)	75 kg (165 lb)	SV Blau-Weiß Bochum
8	Claudia Kern	28 January 1990		R	1.74 m (5 ft 9 in)	68 kg (150 lb)	SV Bayer Uerdingen
9	Theresa Klein	10 August 1984		R	1.66 m (5 ft 5 in)	58 kg (128 lb)	SG Neukoelln Berlin
10	Anja Seyfert	9 April 1990		R	1.66 m (5 ft 5 in)	63 kg (139 lb)	SV Bayer Uerdingen
11	Carmen Gelse	22 September 1987		R	1.76 m (5 ft 9 in)	71 kg (157 lb)	Hannoverscher SV 1892
12	Mandy Zollner	17 April 1985		R	1.70 m (5 ft 7 in)	62 kg (137 lb)	Hannoverscher SV 1892
13	Svea Jagersberg	9 September 1981		R	1.89 m (6 ft 2 in)	95 kg (209 lb)	SV Blau-Weiß Bochum

== Greece ==
No.	Name	Date of birth	Position	L/R	Height	Weight	2010 club
1	Maria Tsouri	25 May 1986		R	1.68 m (5 ft 6 in)	60 kg (130 lb)	
2	Christina Tsoukala	8 July 1991		R	1.85 m (6 ft 1 in)	75 kg (165 lb)	N.C. Vouliagmeni
3	Antiopi Melidoni	11 October 1977		R	1.71 m (5 ft 7 in)	65 kg (143 lb)	N.C. Vouliagmeni
4	Ilektra Psouni	12 September 1985		R	1.70 m (5 ft 7 in)	63 kg (139 lb)	Olympiacos Piraeus
5	Kyriaki Liosi	30 October 1979		R	1.70 m (5 ft 7 in)	63 kg (139 lb)	N.C. Vouliagmeni
6	Alkisti Avramidou	26 February 1988		R	1.70 m (5 ft 7 in)	59 kg (130 lb)	Olympiacos Piraeus
7	Alexandra Asimaki	28 June 1988		R	1.70 m (5 ft 7 in)	66 kg (146 lb)	N.C. Vouliagmeni
8	Antigoni Roumpesi	19 July 1983		R	1.78 m (5 ft 10 in)		N.C. Vouliagmeni
9	Angeliki Gerolymou	22 June 1982		R	1.68 m (5 ft 6 in)	72 kg (159 lb)	N.C. Vouliagmeni
10	Triantafyllia Manolioudaki	19 March 1986		R	1.70 m (5 ft 7 in)	61 kg (134 lb)	Olympiacos Piraeus
11	Stavroula Antonakou	2 May 1982		L	1.70 m (5 ft 7 in)	58 kg (128 lb)	Olympiacos Piraeus
12	Georgia Lara	31 May 1980		R	1.75 m (5 ft 9 in)	78 kg (172 lb)	N.C. Vouliagmeni
13	Eleni Kouvdou	9 August 1989		R	1.75 m (5 ft 9 in)	67 kg (148 lb)	N.C. Vouliagmeni

== Hungary ==
No.	Name	Date of birth	Position	L/R	Height	Weight	2010 club
1	Orsolya Kaso	22 November 1988		R	1.86 m (6 ft 1 in)	73 kg (161 lb)	Dunaujvarosi Foeiskola
2	Hanna Kisteleki	10 March 1991		R	1.74 m (5 ft 9 in)	66 kg (146 lb)	UVSG
3	Rita Poszkoli	20 July 1987		R	1.78 m (5 ft 10 in)	72 kg (159 lb)	Dunaujvarosi Foeiskola
4	Dora Kisteleki	11 May 1983		R	1.73 m (5 ft 8 in)	63 kg (139 lb)	Sportiva Nervi
5	Gabriella Szucs	7 March 1988		R	1.83 m (6 ft 0 in)	72 kg (159 lb)	Dunaujvarosi Foeiskola
6	Orsolya Takacs	20 May 1985		R	1.90 m (6 ft 3 in)	83 kg (183 lb)	Szentes
7	Rita Dravucz	14 April 1980		R	1.80 m (5 ft 11 in)	66 kg (146 lb)	Taylor & Nash Szeged
8	Rita Keszthelyi	10 December 1991		R	1.77 m (5 ft 10 in)	65 kg (143 lb)	Dunaujvarosi Foeiskola
9	Ildiko Toth	23 April 1987		R	1.75 m (5 ft 9 in)	70 kg (150 lb)	Taylor & Nash Szeged
10	Barbara Bujka	5 September 1986		L	1.73 m (5 ft 8 in)	80 kg (180 lb)	AS Palermo 90
11	Ágnes Valkai	27 February 1981		R	1.68 m (5 ft 6 in)	64 kg (141 lb)	Ortigia Siracusa
12	Kata Menczinger	17 January 1989		R	1.79 m (5 ft 10 in)	67 kg (148 lb)	Dunaujvarosi Foeiskola
13	Aniko Gyongyossy	21 May 1990		R	1.85 m (6 ft 1 in)	83 kg (183 lb)	Szentes

== Italy ==
No.	Name	Date of birth	Position	L/R	Height	Weight	2010 club
1	Elena Gigli	9 July 1985		R	1.90 m (6 ft 3 in)	74 kg (163 lb)	Fiorentina Waterpolo
2	Simona Abbate	22 August 1983		R	1.74 m (5 ft 9 in)	65 kg (143 lb)	Fiorentina Waterpolo
3	Elisa Casanova	26 November 1973		L	1.86 m (6 ft 1 in)	98 kg (216 lb)	Fiorentina Waterpolo
4	Federica Radicchi	21 December 1988		R	1.69 m (5 ft 7 in)	64 kg (141 lb)	Geymonat Orizzonte Catania
5	Silvia Motta	31 January 1988		R	1.69 m (5 ft 7 in)	66 kg (146 lb)	Yamamay Varese
6	Arianna Garibotti	9 December 1989		R	1.69 m (5 ft 7 in)	71 kg (157 lb)	Geymonat Orizzonte Catania
7	Rosaria Aiello	12 May 1989		R	1.74 m (5 ft 9 in)	74 kg (163 lb)	C.C. Ortigia
8	Roberta Bianconi	8 July 1989		R	1.75 m (5 ft 9 in)	76 kg (168 lb)	Rapallo
9	Giulia Emmolo	16 October 1991		L	1.72 m (5 ft 8 in)	67 kg (148 lb)	R.N. Imperia 57
10	Federica Rocco	25 November 1984		R	1.76 m (5 ft 9 in)	72 kg (159 lb)	Plebiscito Padova
11	Aleksandra Cotti	13 November 1988		R	1.66 m (5 ft 5 in)	64 kg (141 lb)	Fiorentina Waterpolo
12	Teresa Frassinetti	24 December 1985		R	1.78 m (5 ft 10 in)	70 kg (150 lb)	Fiorentina Waterpolo
13	Giulia Gorlero	26 September 1990		R	1.79 m (5 ft 10 in)	67 kg (148 lb)	R.N. Imperia 57

== Netherlands ==
No.	Name	Date of birth	Position	L/R	Height	Weight	2010 club
1	Ilse van der Meijden	22 October 1988		R	1.86 m (6 ft 1 in)	71 kg (157 lb)	BZC Brandenburg
2	Yasemin Smit	21 November 1984		R	1.79 m (5 ft 10 in)		ZPC Het Ravijn
3	Mieke Cabout	30 March 1986		R	1.82 m (6 ft 0 in)	70 kg (150 lb)	ZVL Leiden
4	Biurakn Hakhverdian	4 October 1985		R	1.72 m (5 ft 8 in)	66 kg (146 lb)	Polar Bears
5	Sabrina van der Sloot	16 March 1991		R	1.74 m (5 ft 9 in)	61 kg (134 lb)	GZC Donk
6	Nomi Stomphorst	23 August 1992		R	1.72 m (5 ft 8 in)	65 kg (143 lb)	GZC Donk
7	Iefke van Belkum	22 July 1986		R	1.86 m (6 ft 1 in)	75 kg (165 lb)	Olympiacos Piraeus
8	Noeki Klein	28 April 1983		R	1.78 m (5 ft 10 in)	76 kg (168 lb)	ZVL Leiden
9	Jantien Cabout	10 January 1988		L	1.72 m (5 ft 8 in)		ZVL Leiden
10	Nienke Vermeer	18 July 1989		R	1.86 m (6 ft 1 in)		Polar Bears
11	Marloes Nijhuis	14 March 1991		R	1.78 m (5 ft 10 in)	69 kg (152 lb)	Polar Bears
12	Simone Koot	12 November 1980		R	1.73 m (5 ft 8 in)		GZC Donk
13	Anne Heinis	20 May 1987		R	1.76 m (5 ft 9 in)		ZVL Leiden

== Russia ==
No.	Name	Date of birth	Position	L/R	Height	Weight	2010 club
1	Evgeniya Protsenko	25 November 1983		R	1.74 m (5 ft 9 in)	61 kg (134 lb)	WC Yugra
2	Nadezda Glyzina	18 August 1988		R	1.75 m (5 ft 9 in)	63 kg (139 lb)	Kinef
3	Ekaterina Prokofyeva	13 March 1991		R	1.76 m (5 ft 9 in)	65 kg (143 lb)	Kinef
4	Sofya Konukh	9 March 1980		R	1.80 m (5 ft 11 in)	71 kg (157 lb)	
5	Evgenia Pustynnikova	17 January 1984		R	1.72 m (5 ft 8 in)	65 kg (143 lb)	Olymp
6	Natalia Ryzhova-Alenicheva	3 August 1987		R	1.75 m (5 ft 9 in)	68 kg (150 lb)	Shturm 2002
7	Ekaterina Tankeeva	28 June 1989		R	1.74 m (5 ft 9 in)	75 kg (165 lb)	Shturm 2002
8	Evgenia Soboleva	26 August 1988		R	1.80 m (5 ft 11 in)	70 kg (150 lb)	Kinef
9	Alexandra Antonova	22 December 1991		L	1.75 m (5 ft 9 in)	66 kg (146 lb)	Skif Moscow
10	Olga Belyaeva	18 March 1985		R	1.76 m (5 ft 9 in)	72 kg (159 lb)	Kinef
11	Evgenia Ivanova	26 July 1987		R	1.76 m (5 ft 9 in)	64 kg (141 lb)	Shturm 2002
12	Yulia Gaufler	18 August 1986		R	1.74 m (5 ft 9 in)	63 kg (139 lb)	Shturm 2002
13	Maria Kovtunovskaya	19 December 1988		R	1.78 m (5 ft 10 in)	68 kg (150 lb)	Kinef

== Spain ==
No.	Name	Date of birth	Position	L/R	Height	Weight	2010 club
1	Laura Ester	22 January 1990		R	1.71 m (5 ft 7 in)	56 kg (123 lb)	CE Mediterrani
2	Blanca Gil Sorli	19 September 1983		R	1.80 m (5 ft 11 in)	70 kg (150 lb)	GS Orizzonte Catania
3	Anna Espar	8 January 1993		R	1.80 m (5 ft 11 in)	67 kg (148 lb)	CN Sabadell
4	Roser Tarrago	25 May 1993		R	1.71 m (5 ft 7 in)	58 kg (128 lb)	CN Mataro
5	Matilde Ortiz	16 September 1990		R	1.75 m (5 ft 9 in)	65 kg (143 lb)	CN Sabadell
6	Helena Lloret Gomez	5 June 1992		L	1.68 m (5 ft 6 in)	60 kg (130 lb)	CN Sabadell
7	Lorena Miranda	7 April 1991		R	1.78 m (5 ft 10 in)	77 kg (170 lb)	CN Alcorcon
8	Pilar Pena	4 April 1986		L	1.73 m (5 ft 8 in)	60 kg (130 lb)	CN Sabadell
9	Andrea Blas	14 February 1992		R	1.76 m (5 ft 9 in)	75 kg (165 lb)	Escuela WP Saragossa
10	Ona Meseguer	20 February 1988		L	1.68 m (5 ft 6 in)	64 kg (141 lb)	CE Mediterrani
11	Maica García Godoy	17 October 1990		R	1.87 m (6 ft 2 in)	80 kg (180 lb)	CN Sabadell
12	Teresa Gorria	17 February 1992		R	1.72 m (5 ft 8 in)	67 kg (148 lb)	CN Sant Andreu
13	Paula Bugallo	16 September 1989		R	1.78 m (5 ft 10 in)	79 kg (174 lb)	Escuela WP Saragossa
