= Water polo at the 2008 Summer Olympics =

Water polo at the Games of the XXIX Olympiad

Tournament details
- Host country: China
- City: Beijing
- Venue(s): Ying Tung Natatorium
- Dates: 10–24 August 2008
- Events: 2 (men's, women's)
- Teams: 12 (men's), 8 (women's) (from 4 confederations)
- Competitors: 153 men, 103 women

Final positions
- Champions: Hungary (men); Netherlands (women)
- Runners-up: United States (men); United States (women)
- Third place: Serbia (men); Australia (women)
- Fourth place: Montenegro (men); Hungary (women)

Tournament statistics (men, women)
- Matches: 64
- Multiple appearances: 5-time Olympian(s): 1; 4-time Olympian(s): 10
- Multiple medalists: 3-time medalist(s): 12

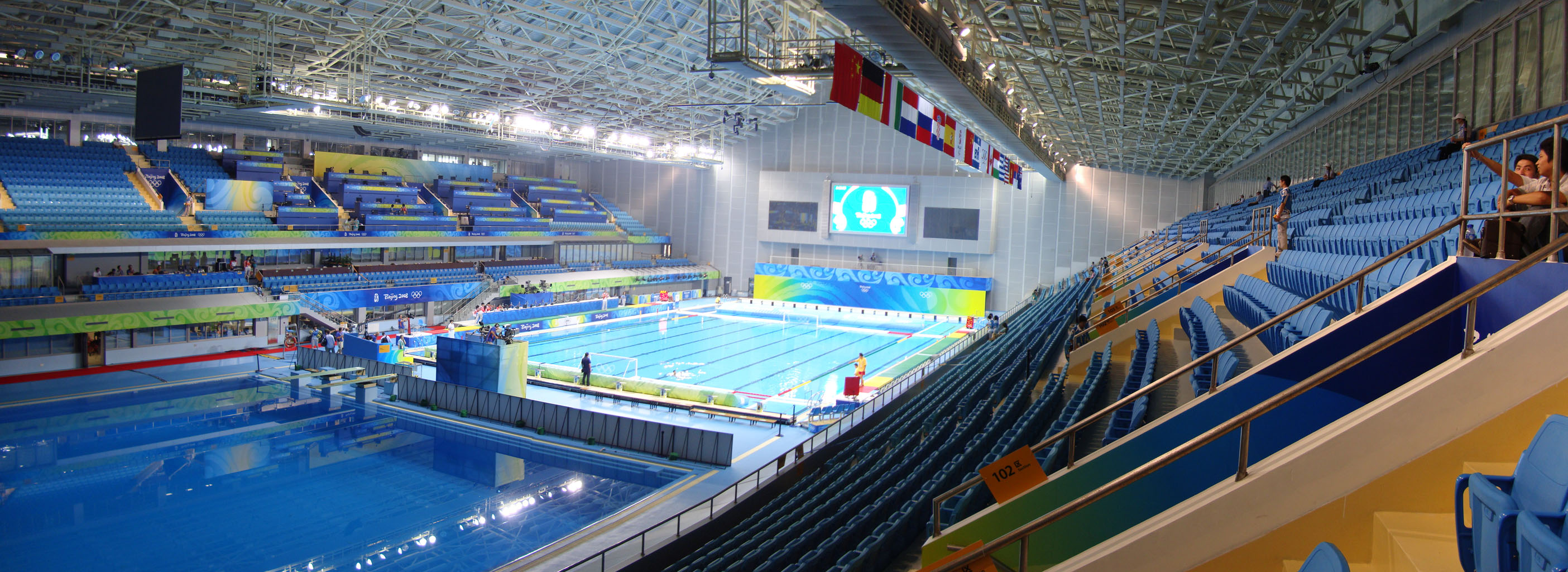
The Ying Tung Natatorium after the Olympic Games.

Water polo at the 2008 Summer Olympics was held from 10 August to 24 August 2008 at the Ying Tung Natatorium in Beijing, People's Republic of China.

== Medalists ==
=== Men's medalists ===
Gold	Silver	Bronze
Hungary Zoltán Szécsi; Tamás Varga; Norbert Madaras; Dénes Varga; Tamás Kásás; Norbert Hosnyánszky; Gergely Kiss; Tibor Benedek; Dániel Varga; Péter Biros; Gábor Kis; Tamás Molnár; István Gergely	United States Merrill Moses; Peter Varellas; Peter Hudnut; Jeff Powers; Adam Wright; Rick Merlo; Layne Beaubien; Tony Azevedo; Ryan Bailey; Tim Hutten; Jesse Smith; J. W. Krumpholz; Brandon Brooks	Serbia Denis Šefik; Živko Gocić; Andrija Prlainović; Vanja Udovičić; Dejan Savić; Duško Pijetlović; Nikola Rađen; Filip Filipović; Aleksandar Ćirić; Aleksandar Šapić; Vladimir Vujasinović; Branko Peković; Slobodan Soro

=== Women's medalists ===
Gold	Silver	Bronze
Netherlands Ilse van der Meijden; Yasemin Smit; Mieke Cabout; Biurakn Hakhverdian; Marieke van den Ham; Daniëlle de Bruijn; Iefke van Belkum; Noeki Klein; Gillian van den Berg; Alette Sijbring; Rianne Guichelaar; Simone Koot; Meike de Nooy Head coach: Robin van Galen	United States Elizabeth Armstrong; Heather Petri; Brittany Hayes; Brenda Villa; Lauren Wenger; Natalie Golda; Patty Cardenas; Jessica Steffens; Elsie Windes; Alison Gregorka; Moriah van Norman; Kami Craig; Jaime Hipp Head coach: Guy Baker	Australia Emma Knox; Gemma Beadsworth; Nikita Cuffe; Rebecca Rippon; Suzie Fraser; Bronwen Knox; Taniele Gofers; Kate Gynther; Jenna Santoromito; Mia Santoromito; Melissa Rippon; Amy Hetzel; Alicia McCormack Head coach: Greg McFadden

== Qualification ==
=== Men ===
Africa	Americas	Asia	Europe	Oceania
	Canada; United States	China	Croatia; Germany; Greece; Hungary; Italy; Montenegro; Serbia; Spain	Australia

=== Women ===
Africa	Americas	Asia	Europe	Oceania
	United States	China	Greece; Hungary; Italy; Netherlands; Russia	Australia

== Sources ==
- PDF documents in the LA84 Foundation Digital Library:
  - Official Results Book – 2008 Olympic Games – Water Polo (download, archive)
- Water polo on the Olympedia website
  - Water polo at the 2008 Summer Olympics (men's tournament, women's tournament)
- Water polo on the Sports Reference website
  - Water polo at the 2008 Summer Games (men's tournament, women's tournament) (archived)
