= Netherlands at the 2011 World Aquatics Championships =

- Flag of the Netherlands
- FINA code: NED
- National federation: Koninklijke Nederlandse Zwembond
- Website: www.knzb.nl

in Shanghai, China
- Medals Ranked 9th: Gold 2 Silver 1 Bronze 3 Total 6

World Aquatics Championships appearances
- 1973; 1975; 1978; 1982; 1986; 1991; 1994; 1998; 2001; 2003; 2005; 2007; 2009; 2011; 2013; 2015; 2017; 2019; 2022; 2023; 2024

Netherlands competed at the 2011 World Aquatics Championships in Shanghai, China between July 16 and 31, 2011.

== Medalists ==
Medal	Name	Sport	Event	Date
Gold	Inge Dekker; Ranomi Kromowidjojo; Marleen Veldhuis; Femke Heemskerk; Maud van der Meer	Swimming	Women's 4x100m Freestyle Relay	24 July
Gold	Inge Dekker	Swimming	Women's 50m Butterfly	30 July
Silver	Ranomi Kromowidjojo	Swimming	Women's 50m Freestyle	31 July
Bronze	Ranomi Kromowidjojo	Swimming	Women's 100m Freestyle	29 July
Bronze	Sharon van Rouwendaal	Swimming	Women's 200m Backstroke	30 July
Bronze	Marleen Veldhuis	Swimming	Women's 50m Freestyle	31 July

== Diving ==
Netherlands has qualified 3 athletes in diving.

Men

Athlete	Event	Preliminary		Semifinals		Final	
Athlete	Event	Points	Rank	Points	Rank	Points	Rank
Yorick de Bruijn	Men's 1m Springboard	288.20	29			did not advance	
Yorick de Bruijn	Men's 3m Springboard	355.25	37	did not advance			
Ramon de Meijer	Men's 3m Springboard	335.55	41	did not advance			
Yorick de Bruijn; Ramon de Meijer	Men's 3m Synchro Springboard	350.10	13			did not advance	

Women

Athlete	Event	Preliminary		Semifinals		Final	
Athlete	Event	Points	Rank	Points	Rank	Points	Rank
Inge Jansen	Women's 1m Springboard	241.95	18			did not advance	
Inge Jansen	Women's 3m Springboard	273.30	20	did not advance			

== Open water swimming ==
Women

Athlete	Event	Final	
Athlete	Event	Time	Position
Linsy Heister	Women's 10km	2:02:33.6	20
Linsy Heister	Women's 25km	DNS	

== Swimming ==
Netherlands qualified 15 swimmers.

Men

Athlete	Event	Heats		Semifinals		Final	
Athlete	Event	Time	Rank	Time	Rank	Time	Rank
Sebastiaan Verschuren	Men's 100m Freestyle	48.60	7 Q	48.41	6 Q	48.27	8
Sebastiaan Verschuren	Men's 200m Freestyle	1:46.53	2 Q	1:47.52	9	did not advance	
Joost Reijns	Men's 200m Freestyle	1:49.56	30	did not advance			
Job Kienhuis	Men's 800m Freestyle	7:52.63	10			did not advance	
Job Kienhuis	Men's 1500m Freestyle	15:05.27	10			did not advance	
Bastiaan Lijesen	Men's 50m Backstroke	25.33	14 Q	25.51	15	did not advance	
Bastiaan Lijesen	Men's 100m Backstroke	55.09	29	did not advance			
Nick Driebergen	Men's 100m Backstroke	54.30	14 Q	53.98	11	did not advance	
Nick Driebergen	Men's 200m Backstroke	1:58.10	9 Q	1:58.08	9	did not advance	
Lennart Stekelenburg	Men's 50m Breaststroke	27.95	15 Q	27.51	5 Q	27.65	7
Lennart Stekelenburg	Men's 100m Breaststroke	1:00.86	16 Q	1:00.50	11	did not advance	
Lennart Stekelenburg	Men's 200m Breaststroke	2:12.69	13 Q	2:11.72	11	did not advance	
Joeri Verlinden	Men's 50m Butterfly	23.96	16 Q	23.73	14	did not advance	
Joeri Verlinden	Men's 100m Butterfly	52.27	9 Q	51.97	8 Q	52.21	7
Nick Driebergen; Lennart Stekelenburg; Joeri Verlinden; Sebastiaan Verschuren	Men's 4 x 100m Medley Relay	3:34.59	3 Q			3:34.11	5

Women

Athlete	Event	Heats		Semifinals		Final	
Athlete	Event	Time	Rank	Time	Rank	Time	Rank
Ranomi Kromowidjojo	Women's 50m Freestyle	25.03	6 Q	24.56	1 Q	24.27	Silver medal
Ranomi Kromowidjojo	Women's 100m Freestyle	54.10	3 Q	53.94	5 Q	53.66	Bronze medal
Marleen Veldhuis	Women's 50m Freestyle	25.01	5 Q	24.88	6 Q	24.49	Bronze medal
Marleen Veldhuis	Women's 50m Butterfly	26.50	12 Q	26.61	14	did not advance	
Femke Heemskerk	Women's 100m Freestyle	53.75	1 Q	53.67	2 Q	53.72	4
Femke Heemskerk	Women's 200m Freestyle	1:57.43	6 Q	1:55.54	1 Q	1:57.63	7
Sharon van Rouwendaal	Women's 100m Backstroke	1:00.61	9 Q	1:00.14	11	did not advance	
Sharon van Rouwendaal	Women's 200m Backstroke	2:09.65	9 Q	2:08.42	6 Q	2:07.78	Bronze medal
Moniek Nijhuis	Women's 50m Breaststroke	31.40	10 Q	31.40	7 Q	31.33	7
Moniek Nijhuis	Women's 100m Breaststroke	1:08.16	12 Q	1:07.60	8 Q	1:07.97	8
Tessa Brouwer	Women's 200m Breaststroke	2:34.93	29	did not advance			
Inge Dekker	Women's 50m Butterfly	26.32	7 Q	25.78	2 Q	25.71	Gold medal
Inge Dekker	Women's 100m Butterfly	58.53	11 Q	58.70	13	did not advance	
Inge Dekker; Ranomi Kromowidjojo; Marleen Veldhuis; Femke Heemskerk; Maud van der Meer*	Women's 4 x 100m Freestyle Relay	3:35.76	2 Q			3:33.96	Gold medal
Femke Heemskerk; Moniek Nijhuis; Inge Dekker; Maud van der Meer	Women's 4 x 100m Medley Relay	4:03.20	11			did not advance	

- * raced in heats only

== Synchronised swimming ==
Netherlands has qualified 11 athletes in synchronised swimming.

Women

Athlete	Event	Preliminary		Final	
Athlete	Event	Points	Rank	Points	Rank
Elisabeth Sneeuw; Nicolien Wellen	Duet Technical Routine	83.700	18	did not advance	
Elisabeth Sneeuw; Nicolien Wellen	Duet Free Routine	85.570	16	did not advance	
Vreni de Fluiter; Christel de Kock; Tina Dermois; Stephanie Gillisse; Rynske Keur; Elisabeth Sneeuw; Nadine Struijk; Nicolien Wellen	Team Technical Routine	83.900	13	did not advance	
Vreni de Fluiter; Christel de Kock; Stephanie Gillisse; Anouk Horrevorts; Rynske Keur; Elisabeth Sneeuw; Nadine Struijk; Nicolien Wellen	Team Free Routine	85.070	13	did not advance	
Vreni de Fluiter; Margot de Graaf; Christel de Kock; Tina Dermois; Stephanie Gillisse; Anouk Horrevorts; Rynske Keur; Elisabeth Sneeuw; Nadine Struijk; Nicolien Wellen	Free Routine Combination	84.430	8 Q	85.440	9

Reserves

- Christina Maat

== Water polo ==
=== Women ===
Team Roster

- Ilse van der Meijden
- Yasemin Smit – Captain
- Mieke Cabout
- Biurakn Hakhverdian
- Sabrina van der Sloot
- Nomi Stomphorst
- Iefke van Belkum
- Robbin Remers
- Jantien Cabout
- Nienke Vermeer
- Lieke Klaassen
- Simone Koot
- Anne Heinis

==== Group A ====
Team	Pld	W	D	L	GF	GA	GD	Pts
United States	3	2	1	0	37	18	+19	5
Netherlands	3	1	2	0	29	19	+10	4
Hungary	3	1	1	1	37	31	+6	3
Kazakhstan	3	0	0	3	13	48	−35	0

July 17, 2011; 09:30	Report	Netherlands	7–7	United States	Shanghai Oriental Sports Center, Shanghai; Attendance: 700; Referees: Caputi (ITA); Margets (SLO)
July 17, 2011; 09:30	Report	Score by quarters: 1–1, 2–2, 3–2, 1–2			Shanghai Oriental Sports Center, Shanghai; Attendance: 700; Referees: Caputi (ITA); Margets (SLO)
July 17, 2011; 09:30	Report	Vermeer 3	Goals	Wenger 3	Shanghai Oriental Sports Center, Shanghai; Attendance: 700; Referees: Caputi (ITA); Margets (SLO)

July 19, 2011; 19:40	Report	Netherlands	13–3	Kazakhstan	Shanghai Oriental Sports Center, Shanghai; Attendance: 500; Referees: Cabral (BRA), Wengenroth (SUO)
July 19, 2011; 19:40	Report	Score by quarters: 4–1, 3–1, 3–0, 3–1			Shanghai Oriental Sports Center, Shanghai; Attendance: 500; Referees: Cabral (BRA), Wengenroth (SUO)
July 19, 2011; 19:40	Report	Vermeer 4	Goals	Gritsenko 2	Shanghai Oriental Sports Center, Shanghai; Attendance: 500; Referees: Cabral (BRA), Wengenroth (SUO)

July 21, 2011; 13:30	Report	Netherlands	9–9	Hungary	Shanghai Oriental Sports Center, Shanghai; Attendance: 300; Referees: Caputi (ITA), Williams (NZL)
July 21, 2011; 13:30	Report	Score by quarters: 3–1, 0–0, 3–3, 3–5			Shanghai Oriental Sports Center, Shanghai; Attendance: 300; Referees: Caputi (ITA), Williams (NZL)
July 21, 2011; 13:30	Report	M. Cabout, van Belkum 4	Goals	Bujka 3	Shanghai Oriental Sports Center, Shanghai; Attendance: 300; Referees: Caputi (ITA), Williams (NZL)

==== Playoff round ====
July 23, 2011; 12:10	Report	Netherlands	14–6	New Zealand	Shanghai Oriental Sports Center, Shanghai; Attendance: 350; Referees: Balfanbayev (KAZ), Cabral (BRA)
July 23, 2011; 12:10	Report	Score by quarters: 6–2, 2–0, 3–3, 3–1			Shanghai Oriental Sports Center, Shanghai; Attendance: 350; Referees: Balfanbayev (KAZ), Cabral (BRA)
July 23, 2011; 12:10	Report	M. Cabout, van Belkum 3	Goals	Mason, Shieprath 2	Shanghai Oriental Sports Center, Shanghai; Attendance: 350; Referees: Balfanbayev (KAZ), Cabral (BRA)

==== Quarterfinals ====
July 25, 2011; 15:20	Report	Greece	12–10	Netherlands	Shanghai Oriental Sports Center, Shanghai; Attendance: 350; Referees: Brgulian (MNE), Balfanbayev (KAZ)
July 25, 2011; 15:20	Report	Score by quarters: 3–4, 5–1, 2–3, 2–2			Shanghai Oriental Sports Center, Shanghai; Attendance: 350; Referees: Brgulian (MNE), Balfanbayev (KAZ)
July 25, 2011; 15:20	Report	Roumpesi 3	Goals	van Belkum 3	Shanghai Oriental Sports Center, Shanghai; Attendance: 350; Referees: Brgulian (MNE), Balfanbayev (KAZ)

==== Classification 5–8 ====
July 27, 2011; 15:30	Report	Netherlands	7–12	Australia	Shanghai Oriental Sports Center, Shanghai; Attendance: 900; Referees: Juhaz (HUN), Balfanbayev (KAZ)
July 27, 2011; 15:30	Report	Score by quarters: 1–4, 2–4, 3–3, 1–1			Shanghai Oriental Sports Center, Shanghai; Attendance: 900; Referees: Juhaz (HUN), Balfanbayev (KAZ)
July 27, 2011; 15:30	Report	van Belkum 3	Goals	Knox 4	Shanghai Oriental Sports Center, Shanghai; Attendance: 900; Referees: Juhaz (HUN), Balfanbayev (KAZ)

==== Seventh place game ====
July 29, 2011; 09:30	Report	Canada	7–8	Netherlands	Shanghai Oriental Sports Center, Shanghai; Attendance: 200; Referees: Koryzna (POL), Pinker (RSA)
July 29, 2011; 09:30	Report	Score by quarters: 2–0, 1–3, 3–4, 1–1			Shanghai Oriental Sports Center, Shanghai; Attendance: 200; Referees: Koryzna (POL), Pinker (RSA)
July 29, 2011; 09:30	Report	Csikos 3	Goals	three players 2	Shanghai Oriental Sports Center, Shanghai; Attendance: 200; Referees: Koryzna (POL), Pinker (RSA)
