= Water polo at the 2008 Summer Olympics – Women's tournament =

Women's water polo at the Games of the XXIX Olympiad

Tournament details
- Host country: China
- City: Beijing
- Venue(s): Ying Tung Natatorium
- Dates: 11–21 August 2008
- Teams: 8 (from 4 confederations)
- Competitors: 103

Final positions
- Champions: Netherlands (1st title)
- Runners-up: United States
- Third place: Australia
- Fourth place: Hungary

Tournament statistics
- Matches: 20
- Goals scored: 370 (18.5 per match)
- Multiple appearances: 3-time Olympian(s): 4
- Multiple medalists: 3-time medalist(s): 2
- Top scorer(s): (Netherlands) Daniëlle de Bruijn (17 goals in 6 matches)
- Most saves: (United States) Elizabeth Armstrong (49 saves in 5 matches)
- Top sprinter(s): (China) Wang Yi (18 sprints won in 5 matches)

The women's water polo tournament at the 2008 Summer Olympics in Beijing was held from 11 August to 21 August at the Ying Tung Natatorium.

Teams from eight nations competed, seeded into two groups for the preliminary round. 20 games were played, 12 of them in the preliminary round (each team played the other teams in the group). Eight games were played in the final round.

== Format ==
The tournament featured eight teams, separated into two groups of four teams. Each team played the other three teams in its pool once in a round-robin format. The first-place team in each pool qualified directly for the semifinal, the second- and third-place teams moved on to the quarterfinal round, and the fourth-place teams played each other in a seventh place game.

The winners of the quarterfinal games moved on to the semifinals to face the top teams from each pool, while the quarterfinal losers played a fifth place classification game. The semifinal winners played in the gold medal game, while the losers played each other for the bronze.

== Preliminary round ==
All times are CST (UTC+8).

=== Group A ===
| Team | Pld | W | D | L | GF | GA | GD | Pts | Qualification |
|---|---|---|---|---|---|---|---|---|---|
| United States | 3 | 2 | 1 | 0 | 33 | 27 | +6 | 5 | Qualified for semifinals |
| Italy | 3 | 2 | 1 | 0 | 28 | 26 | +2 | 5 | Qualified for quarterfinals |
| China | 3 | 1 | 0 | 2 | 33 | 33 | 0 | 2 | Qualified for quarterfinals |
| Russia | 3 | 0 | 0 | 3 | 26 | 34 | −8 | 0 | Will play for places 7th–8th |

| 11 August 2008; 14:20 | Report | Russia | 8–9 | Italy | Ying Tung Natatorium, Beijing; Referees: Gaetan Turcotte (CAN), Nikolaos Argyros (GRE) |
| 11 August 2008; 14:20 | Report | Score by quarters: 3–3, 2–1, 2–3, 1–2 | | | Ying Tung Natatorium, Beijing; Referees: Gaetan Turcotte (CAN), Nikolaos Argyros (GRE) |
| 11 August 2008; 14:20 | Report | Smurova 2 | Goals | Miceli 2, di Mario 2 | Ying Tung Natatorium, Beijing; Referees: Gaetan Turcotte (CAN), Nikolaos Argyros (GRE) |

| 11 August 2008; 17:00 | Report | United States | 12–11 | China | Ying Tung Natatorium, Beijing; Referees: Gabor Kiszelly (HUN), Ahmet Erhan Tulga (TUR) |
| 11 August 2008; 17:00 | Report | Score by quarters: 3–3, 5–4, 2–2, 2–2 | | | Ying Tung Natatorium, Beijing; Referees: Gabor Kiszelly (HUN), Ahmet Erhan Tulga (TUR) |
| 11 August 2008; 17:00 | Report | Golda 4, Craig 3, Hayes 2 | Goals | Gao 3, Teng 2, Sun Yu. 2, Sun H. 2 | Ying Tung Natatorium, Beijing; Referees: Gabor Kiszelly (HUN), Ahmet Erhan Tulga (TUR) |

| 13 August 2008; 15:40 | Report | United States | 9–9 | Italy | Ying Tung Natatorium, Beijing; Referees: Alan Balfanbayev (KAZ), Gabor Kiszelly (HUN) |
| 13 August 2008; 15:40 | Report | Score by quarters: 0–2, 4–2, 2–2, 3–3 | | | Ying Tung Natatorium, Beijing; Referees: Alan Balfanbayev (KAZ), Gabor Kiszelly (HUN) |
| 13 August 2008; 15:40 | Report | Hayes 2, Villa 2 | Goals | Miceli 2, di Mario 2 | Ying Tung Natatorium, Beijing; Referees: Alan Balfanbayev (KAZ), Gabor Kiszelly (HUN) |

| 13 August 2008; 17:00 | Report | Russia | 11–13 | China | Ying Tung Natatorium, Beijing; Referees: Gaetan Turcotte (CAN), Torsten Bock (GER) |
| 13 August 2008; 17:00 | Report | Score by quarters: 2–3, 5–4, 3–1, 1–5 | | | Ying Tung Natatorium, Beijing; Referees: Gaetan Turcotte (CAN), Torsten Bock (GER) |
| 13 August 2008; 17:00 | Report | Pantyulina 3, Vylegzhanina 2 | Goals | Sun Yu. 4, Gao 2, Sun H. 2 | Ying Tung Natatorium, Beijing; Referees: Gaetan Turcotte (CAN), Torsten Bock (GER) |

| 15 August 2008; 14:20 | Report | Russia | 7–12 | United States | Ying Tung Natatorium, Beijing; Referees: Jaime Moliner Molins (ESP), Ahmet Erhan Tulga (TUR) |
| 15 August 2008; 14:20 | Report | Score by quarters: 0–5, 3–2, 2–4, 2–1 | | | Ying Tung Natatorium, Beijing; Referees: Jaime Moliner Molins (ESP), Ahmet Erhan Tulga (TUR) |
| 15 August 2008; 14:20 | Report | Konukh 2, Turova 2 | Goals | Golda 3, Villa 2, Gregorka 2 | Ying Tung Natatorium, Beijing; Referees: Jaime Moliner Molins (ESP), Ahmet Erhan Tulga (TUR) |

| 15 August 2008; 17:00 | Report | Italy | 10–9 | China | Ying Tung Natatorium, Beijing; Referees: Gabor Kiszelly (HUN), Boris Margeta (SLO) |
| 15 August 2008; 17:00 | Report | Score by quarters: 2–2, 4–2, 2–4, 2–1 | | | Ying Tung Natatorium, Beijing; Referees: Gabor Kiszelly (HUN), Boris Margeta (SLO) |
| 15 August 2008; 17:00 | Report | Casanova 4, di Mario 3 | Goals | Sun Ya. 3, Wang Yi 2, Qiao 2 | Ying Tung Natatorium, Beijing; Referees: Gabor Kiszelly (HUN), Boris Margeta (SLO) |

=== Group B ===
| Team | Pld | W | D | L | GF | GA | GD | Pts | Qualification |
|---|---|---|---|---|---|---|---|---|---|
| Hungary | 3 | 2 | 1 | 0 | 28 | 20 | +8 | 5 | Qualified for semifinals |
| Australia | 3 | 2 | 1 | 0 | 25 | 22 | +3 | 5 | Qualified for quarterfinals |
| Netherlands | 3 | 1 | 0 | 2 | 27 | 27 | 0 | 2 | Qualified for quarterfinals |
| Greece | 3 | 0 | 0 | 3 | 16 | 27 | −11 | 0 | Will play for places 7th–8th |

| 11 August 2008; 13:00 | Report | Hungary | 11–9 | Netherlands | Ying Tung Natatorium, Beijing; Referees: Massimiliano Caputi (ITA), Radoslaw Piotr Koryzna (POL) |
| 11 August 2008; 13:00 | Report | Score by quarters: 3–3, 3–2, 4–3, 1–1 | | | Ying Tung Natatorium, Beijing; Referees: Massimiliano Caputi (ITA), Radoslaw Piotr Koryzna (POL) |
| 11 August 2008; 13:00 | Report | Pelle 4, Kisteleki 2, Stieber 2, Valkai 2 | Goals | de Bruijn 4, van den Berg 3 | Ying Tung Natatorium, Beijing; Referees: Massimiliano Caputi (ITA), Radoslaw Piotr Koryzna (POL) |

| 11 August 2008; 15:40 | Report | Greece | 6–8 | Australia | Ying Tung Natatorium, Beijing; Referees: Decio Jr Patelli (BRA), Boris Margeta (SLO) |
| 11 August 2008; 15:40 | Report | Score by quarters: 2–5, 2–2, 1–1, 1–0 | | | Ying Tung Natatorium, Beijing; Referees: Decio Jr Patelli (BRA), Boris Margeta (SLO) |
| 11 August 2008; 15:40 | Report | Roumpesi 3, Liosi 2 | Goals | Beadsworth 4, Gofers 2 | Ying Tung Natatorium, Beijing; Referees: Decio Jr Patelli (BRA), Boris Margeta (SLO) |

| 13 August 2008; 13:00 | Report | Hungary | 7–7 | Australia | Ying Tung Natatorium, Beijing; Referees: Mario Brguljan (MNE), Ahmet Erhan Tulga (TUR) |
| 13 August 2008; 13:00 | Report | Score by quarters: 1–1, 1–1, 1–2, 4–3 | | | Ying Tung Natatorium, Beijing; Referees: Mario Brguljan (MNE), Ahmet Erhan Tulga (TUR) |
| 13 August 2008; 13:00 | Report | Drávucz 3, Pelle 2, Valkai 2 | Goals | R. Rippon 2, B. Knox 2, M. Rippon 2 | Ying Tung Natatorium, Beijing; Referees: Mario Brguljan (MNE), Ahmet Erhan Tulga (TUR) |

| 13 August 2008; 14:20 | Report | Greece | 6–9 | Netherlands | Ying Tung Natatorium, Beijing; Referees: Shiwei Ni (CHN), Decio Jr Patelli (BRA) |
| 13 August 2008; 14:20 | Report | Score by quarters: 3–3, 2–2, 1–3, 0–1 | | | Ying Tung Natatorium, Beijing; Referees: Shiwei Ni (CHN), Decio Jr Patelli (BRA) |
| 13 August 2008; 14:20 | Report | Liosi 2 | Goals | Cabout 4, de Bruijn 2, van Belkum 2 | Ying Tung Natatorium, Beijing; Referees: Shiwei Ni (CHN), Decio Jr Patelli (BRA) |

| 15 August 2008; 13:00 | Report | Netherlands | 9–10 | Australia | Ying Tung Natatorium, Beijing; Referees: Massimiliano Caputi (ITA), Gaetan Turcotte (CAN) |
| 15 August 2008; 13:00 | Report | Score by quarters: 1–2, 2–2, 1–2, 5–4 | | | Ying Tung Natatorium, Beijing; Referees: Massimiliano Caputi (ITA), Gaetan Turcotte (CAN) |
| 15 August 2008; 13:00 | Report | van den Ham 3, van Belkum 2, Sijbring 2 | Goals | B. Knox 4, Beadsworth 2, Gynther 2 | Ying Tung Natatorium, Beijing; Referees: Massimiliano Caputi (ITA), Gaetan Turcotte (CAN) |

| 15 August 2008; 15:40 | Report | Hungary | 10–4 | Greece | Ying Tung Natatorium, Beijing; Referees: Alan Balfanbayev (KAZ), Decio Jr Patelli (BRA) |
| 15 August 2008; 15:40 | Report | Score by quarters: 1–1, 3–1, 3–0, 3–2 | | | Ying Tung Natatorium, Beijing; Referees: Alan Balfanbayev (KAZ), Decio Jr Patelli (BRA) |
| 15 August 2008; 15:40 | Report | Kisteleki 2, Stieber 2, Drávucz 2, Pelle 2 | Goals | Gerolymou 1, Liosi 1, Roumpesi 1, Asimaki 1 | Ying Tung Natatorium, Beijing; Referees: Alan Balfanbayev (KAZ), Decio Jr Patelli (BRA) |

== Final rounds ==
Bracket

Quarterfinals
A3 | China | 11
B2 | Australia | 12
A2 | Italy | 11
B3 | Netherlands | 13

Semifinals
A1 | United States | 9
B2 | Australia | 8
B1 | Hungary | 7
B3 | Netherlands | 8
5th–6th
5 | China | 10
6 | Italy | 7

Gold medal match
United States | 8
Netherlands | 9
Bronze medal match
Australia | 12
4 | Hungary | 11

=== 7th place match ===
All times are CST (UTC+8).

| 17 August 2008; 13:00 | Report | Russia | 12–6 | Greece | Ying Tung Natatorium, Beijing; Referees: Stephen Knights (NZL), Guy Pinker (RSA) |
| 17 August 2008; 13:00 | Report | Score by quarters: 3–2, 4–1, 3–1, 2–2 | | | Ying Tung Natatorium, Beijing; Referees: Stephen Knights (NZL), Guy Pinker (RSA) |
| 17 August 2008; 13:00 | Report | Shepelina 3, Konukh 3, Pantyulina 2, Belyaeva 2 | Goals | Roumpesi 4 | Ying Tung Natatorium, Beijing; Referees: Stephen Knights (NZL), Guy Pinker (RSA) |

=== Quarterfinals ===
All times are CST (UTC+8).

| 17 August 2008; 14:20 | Report | China | 11–12 | Australia | Ying Tung Natatorium, Beijing; Referees: Decio Jr Patelli (BRA), Jaime Moliner Molins (ESP) |
| 17 August 2008; 14:20 | Report | Score by quarters: 4–4, 2–2, 2–4, 3–2 | | | Ying Tung Natatorium, Beijing; Referees: Decio Jr Patelli (BRA), Jaime Moliner Molins (ESP) |
| 17 August 2008; 14:20 | Report | Ma 3, Sun H. 2 | Goals | Gynther 5, Cuffe 2, M. Rippon 2 | Ying Tung Natatorium, Beijing; Referees: Decio Jr Patelli (BRA), Jaime Moliner Molins (ESP) |

| 17 August 2008; 15:40 | Report | Italy | 11–13 (OT, PSO) | Netherlands | Ying Tung Natatorium, Beijing; Referees: Torsten Bock (GER), Nikolaos Argyros (GRE) |
| 17 August 2008; 15:40 | Report | Score by quarters: 2–2, 1–3, 3–2, 2–1 OT: 0–0, 0–0 PSO: 3–5 | | | Ying Tung Natatorium, Beijing; Referees: Torsten Bock (GER), Nikolaos Argyros (GRE) |
| 17 August 2008; 15:40 | Report | Zanchi 4, Miceli 2, Bosurgi 2 | Goals | Cabout 4, de Bruijn 3, Smit 2, van Belkum 2 | Ying Tung Natatorium, Beijing; Referees: Torsten Bock (GER), Nikolaos Argyros (GRE) |

=== 5th place match ===
All times are CST (UTC+8).

| 19 August 2008; 13:00 | Report | China | 10–7 | Italy | Ying Tung Natatorium, Beijing; Referees: Ahmet Erhan Tulga (TUR), Gaetan Turcotte (CAN) |
| 19 August 2008; 13:00 | Report | Score by quarters: 3–1, 2–3, 1–3, 4–0 | | | Ying Tung Natatorium, Beijing; Referees: Ahmet Erhan Tulga (TUR), Gaetan Turcotte (CAN) |
| 19 August 2008; 13:00 | Report | Gao 4, Sun H. 2 | Goals | di Mario 3, Zanchi 2 | Ying Tung Natatorium, Beijing; Referees: Ahmet Erhan Tulga (TUR), Gaetan Turcotte (CAN) |

=== Semifinals ===
All times are CST (UTC+8).

| 19 August 2008; 14:20 | Report | United States | 9–8 | Australia | Ying Tung Natatorium, Beijing; Referees: Boris Margeta (SLO), Massimiliano Caputi (ITA) |
| 19 August 2008; 14:20 | Report | Score by quarters: 2–2, 2–2, 4–1, 1–3 | | | Ying Tung Natatorium, Beijing; Referees: Boris Margeta (SLO), Massimiliano Caputi (ITA) |
| 19 August 2008; 14:20 | Report | Villa 3 Hayes 2 Golda, Steffens, Gregorka, Craig 1 | Goals | Gynther 3 R. Rippon 2 Beadsworth, Knox, M. Rippon 1 | Ying Tung Natatorium, Beijing; Referees: Boris Margeta (SLO), Massimiliano Caputi (ITA) |

| 19 August 2008; 15:40 | Report | Hungary | 7–8 | Netherlands | Ying Tung Natatorium, Beijing; Referees: Mario Brguljan (MNE), Sergey Antsiferov (RUS) |
| 19 August 2008; 15:40 | Report | Score by quarters: 2–1, 1–3, 3–3, 1–1 | | | Ying Tung Natatorium, Beijing; Referees: Mario Brguljan (MNE), Sergey Antsiferov (RUS) |
| 19 August 2008; 15:40 | Report | Pelle 3 Drávucz, Primász 2 | Goals | van den Ham, van Belkum 3 Cabout, Sijbring 1 | Ying Tung Natatorium, Beijing; Referees: Mario Brguljan (MNE), Sergey Antsiferov (RUS) |

=== Bronze medal match ===
All times are CST (UTC+8).

| 21 August 2008; 17:00 | Report | (bronze) Australia | 12–11 (OT, PSO) | Hungary | Ying Tung Natatorium, Beijing; Referees: Sergey Antsiferov (RUS), Mladen Rak (CRO) |
| 21 August 2008; 17:00 | Report | Score by quarters: 2–2, 1–3, 3–1, 1–1 OT: 2–1, 0–1 PSO: 3–2 | | | Ying Tung Natatorium, Beijing; Referees: Sergey Antsiferov (RUS), Mladen Rak (CRO) |
| 21 August 2008; 17:00 | Report | Knox, Gynther 3 Fraser 2 Beadsworth, R. Rippon, Santoromito, M. Rippon 1 | Goals | Kisteleki 4 Valkai 3 Drávucz 2 Zantleitner, Pelle 1 | Ying Tung Natatorium, Beijing; Referees: Sergey Antsiferov (RUS), Mladen Rak (CRO) |

=== Gold medal match ===
All times are CST (UTC+8).

| 21 August 2008; 18:20 | Report | (silver) United States | 8–9 | Netherlands (gold) | Ying Tung Natatorium, Beijing; Referees: Gabor Kiszelly (HUN), Massimiliano Caputi (ITA) |
| 21 August 2008; 18:20 | Report | Score by quarters: 2–4, 3–1, 1–2, 2–2 | | | Ying Tung Natatorium, Beijing; Referees: Gabor Kiszelly (HUN), Massimiliano Caputi (ITA) |
| 21 August 2008; 18:20 | Report | Steffens 2 Hayes, Villa, Golda, Gregorka, van Norman, Craig 1 | Goals | de Bruijn 7 van Belkum, van den Ham 1 | Ying Tung Natatorium, Beijing; Referees: Gabor Kiszelly (HUN), Massimiliano Caputi (ITA) |

== Ranking and statistics ==
=== Final ranking ===
| Rank | Team |
|---|---|
| 1 | Netherlands |
| 2 | United States |
| 3 | Australia |
| 4 | Hungary |
| 5 | China |
| 6 | Italy |
| 7 | Russia |
| 8 | Greece |

2008 Women's Olympic champions

Netherlands
First title

=== Multi-time Olympians ===
Three-time Olympian(s): 4 players

- Russia: Sofia Konukh, Elena Smurova
- United States: Heather Petri, Brenda Villa

=== Multiple medalists ===
Three-time Olympic medalist(s): 2 players

- United States: Heather Petri, Brenda Villa

=== Top goalscorers ===
| Rank | Player | GP | G |
|---|---|---|---|
| 1 | Daniëlle de Bruijn (NED) | 6 | 17 |
| 2 | Kate Gynther (AUS) | 6 | 13 |
| 3 | Bronwen Knox (AUS) | 6 | 12 |
| 3 | Anikó Pelle (HUN) | 5 | 12 |
| 5 | Ao Gao (CHN) | 5 | 11 |
| 6 | Iefke van Belkum (NED) | 6 | 10 |
| 6 | Mieke Cabout (NED) | 6 | 10 |
| 6 | Rita Drávucz (HUN) | 5 | 10 |
| 6 | Tania di Mario (ITA) | 5 | 10 |
| 10 | Gemma Beadsworth (AUS) | 6 | 9 |
| 10 | Natalie Golda (USA) | 5 | 9 |
| 10 | Marieke van den Ham (NED) | 6 | 9 |
| 10 | Antigoni Roumpesi (GRE) | 4 | 9 |
| 10 | Brenda Villa (USA) | 5 | 9 |

== Medallists ==
| Gold | Silver | Bronze |
| Netherlands Ilse van der Meijden; Yasemin Smit; Mieke Cabout; Biurakn Hakhverdian; Marieke van den Ham; Daniëlle de Bruijn; Iefke van Belkum; Noeki Klein; Gillian van den Berg; Alette Sijbring; Rianne Guichelaar; Simone Koot; Meike de Nooy Head coach: Robin van Galen | United States Elizabeth Armstrong; Heather Petri; Brittany Hayes; Brenda Villa; Lauren Wenger; Natalie Golda; Patty Cardenas; Jessica Steffens; Elsie Windes; Alison Gregorka; Moriah van Norman; Kami Craig; Jaime Hipp Head coach: Guy Baker | Australia Emma Knox; Gemma Beadsworth; Nikita Cuffe; Rebecca Rippon; Suzie Fraser; Bronwen Knox; Taniele Gofers; Kate Gynther; Jenna Santoromito; Mia Santoromito; Melissa Rippon; Amy Hetzel; Alicia McCormack Head coach: Greg McFadden |

== Awards ==
Media All-Star Team

- Goalkeeper
  - (Hungary) Patrícia Horváth (43 saves)
- Field players
  - (Netherlands) Daniëlle de Bruijn (left-handed, 17 goals, 15 sprints won)
  - (Italy) Elisa Casanova (left-handed, 7 goals)
  - (China) Gao Ao (11 goals)
  - (Australia) Bronwen Knox (12 goals)
  - (United States) Jessica Steffens (5 goals)
  - (Hungary) Ágnes Valkai (7 goals, 10 sprints won)

== See also ==
- Water polo at the 2008 Summer Olympics – Men's tournament

== Sources ==
- PDF documents in the LA84 Foundation Digital Library:
  - Official Results Book – 2008 Olympic Games – Water Polo (download, archive)
- Water polo on the Olympedia website
  - Water polo at the 2008 Summer Olympics (women's tournament)
- Water polo on the Sports Reference website
  - Water polo at the 2008 Summer Games (women's tournament) (archived)
