= Netherlands women's Olympic water polo team records and statistics =

This article lists various water polo records and statistics in relation to the Netherlands women's national water polo team at the Summer Olympics.

The Netherlands women's national water polo team has participated in 2 of 5 official women's water polo tournaments.

== Abbreviations ==
Apps	Appearances	Rk	Rank	Ref	Reference	Cap No.	Water polo cap number
Pos	Playing position	FP	Field player	GK	Goalkeeper	ISHOF	International Swimming Hall of Fame
L/R	Handedness	L	Left-handed	R	Right-handed	Oly debut	Olympic debut in water polo
(C)	Captain	p.	page	pp.	pages		

== Team statistics ==
=== Comprehensive results by tournament ===
Note: Results of Olympic qualification tournaments are not included. Last updated: 5 May 2021.

Legend

- 1st – Champions
- 2nd – Runners-up
- 3rd – Third place
- 4th – Fourth place
- Q – Qualified for forthcoming tournament

Women's team	2000	2004	2008	2012	2016	2020	Years
Netherlands	4th		1st			6th	3
Total teams	6	8	8	8	8	10	

=== Number of appearances ===
Last updated: 5 May 2021.

Women's team	Apps	Record streak	Active streak	Debut	Most recent	Best finish	Confederation
Netherlands	2	1	0	2000	2020	Champions	Europe – LEN

=== Best finishes ===
Last updated: 5 May 2021.

Women's team	Best finish	Apps	Confederation
Netherlands	Champions (2008)	2	Europe – LEN

=== Finishes in the top four ===
Last updated: 5 May 2021.

Women's team	Total	Champions	Runners-up	Third place	Fourth place	First	Last
Netherlands	2	1 (2008)			1 (2000)	2000	2008

=== Medal table ===
Last updated: 5 May 2021.

Women's team	Gold	Silver	Bronze	Total
Netherlands (NED)	1	0	0	1

== Player statistics ==
=== Multiple appearances ===
The following table is pre-sorted by number of Olympic appearances (in descending order), year of the last Olympic appearance (in ascending order), year of the first Olympic appearance (in ascending order), date of birth (in ascending order), name of the player (in ascending order), respectively.

- Number of three-time Olympians: 0
- Number of two-time Olympians: 2
- Last updated: 26 July 2021.

Female athletes who competed in water polo at two or more Olympics
Apps	Player	Birth	Pos	Water polo tournaments					Age of first/last	ISHOF member	Note	Ref
Apps	Player	Birth	Pos	1	2	3	4	5	Age of first/last	ISHOF member	Note	Ref
2	Gillian van den Berg	1971	FP	2000		2008			29/36			
2	Daniëlle de Bruijn	1978	FP	2000		2008			22/30			

=== Multiple medalists ===
The following table is pre-sorted by total number of Olympic medals (in descending order), number of Olympic gold medals (in descending order), number of Olympic silver medals (in descending order), year of receiving the last Olympic medal (in ascending order), year of receiving the first Olympic medal (in ascending order), name of the player (in ascending order), respectively.

- Number of three-time Olympic medalists: 0
- Number of two-time Olympic medalists: 0
- Last updated: 1 May 2021.

=== Top goalscorers ===
The following table is pre-sorted by number of total goals (in descending order), year of the last Olympic appearance (in ascending order), year of the first Olympic appearance (in ascending order), name of the player (in ascending order), respectively.

- Number of goalscorers (40+ goals): 0
- Number of goalscorers (30–39 goals): 0
- Number of goalscorers (20–29 goals): 1
- Last updated: 1 April 2021.

Female players with 20 or more goals at the Olympics
Rk	Player	Birth	L/R	Total goals	Water polo tournaments (goals)					Age of first/last	ISHOF member	Note	Ref
Rk	Player	Birth	L/R	Total goals	1	2	3	4	5	Age of first/last	ISHOF member	Note	Ref
1	Daniëlle de Bruijn	1978	Left	28	2000 (11)		2008 (17)			22/30			

- Official Results Books (PDF): 2000 (p. 99), 2008 (pp. 71–72).

=== Goalkeepers ===
The following table is pre-sorted by edition of the Olympics (in ascending order), cap number or name of the goalkeeper (in ascending order), respectively.

Last updated: 1 April 2021.

Abbreviation

- Eff % – Save efficiency (Saves / Shots)

Year	Cap No.	Goalkeeper	Birth	Age	Saves	Shots	Eff %	ISHOF member	Note	Ref
2000	1	Karla Plugge	1968	31	45	81	55.6%		Starting goalkeeper	
2000	6	Hellen Boering	1964	36	0	0	—			
2008 (gold)	1	Ilse van der Meijden	1988	19	45	98	45.9%		Starting goalkeeper	
2008 (gold)	13	Meike de Nooy	1983	25	0	0	—			
Year	Cap No.	Goalkeeper	Birth	Age	Saves	Shots	Eff %	ISHOF member	Note	Ref

- Official Results Books (PDF): 2000 (p. 99), 2008 (pp. 71–72).

=== Top sprinters ===
The following table is pre-sorted by number of total sprints won (in descending order), year of the last Olympic appearance (in ascending order), year of the first Olympic appearance (in ascending order), name of the sprinter (in ascending order), respectively.

* Number of sprinters (30+ sprints won): 0

- Number of sprinters (20–29 sprints won): 1
- Number of sprinters (10–19 sprints won): 0
- Number of sprinters (5–9 sprints won): 0
- Last updated: 15 May 2021.

Abbreviation

- Eff % – Efficiency (Sprints won / Sprints contested)

Female players with 5 or more sprints won at the Olympics
Rk	Sprinter	Birth	Total sprints won	Total sprints contested	Eff %	Water polo tournaments (sprints won / contested)					Age of first/last	ISHOF member	Note	Ref
Rk	Sprinter	Birth	Total sprints won	Total sprints contested	Eff %	1	2	3	4	5	Age of first/last	ISHOF member	Note	Ref
1	Daniëlle de Bruijn	1978	24	45	53.3%	2000 (9/23)		2008 (15/22)			22/30			

- Official Results Books (PDF): 2000 (p. 99), 2008 (pp. 71–72).

== Olympic champions ==
=== 2008 Summer Olympics ===
- Edition of women's tournament: 3rd
- Host city: Beijing, China
- Number of participating teams: 8
- Competition format: Round-robin pools advanced teams to classification matches
- Champion: Netherlands (1st title; 3rd place in preliminary B group)

Match	Round	Date	Cap color	Opponent	Result	Goals for	Goals against	Goals diff.
Match 1/6	Preliminary round – Group B	11 August 2008	Blue	Hungary	Lost	9	11	-2
Match 2/6	Preliminary round – Group B	13 August 2008	Blue	Greece	Won	9	6	3
Match 3/6	Preliminary round – Group B	15 August 2008	White	Australia	Lost	9	10	-1
Match 4/6	Quarter-finals	17 August 2008	Blue	Italy	Won	13	11	2
Match 5/6	Semi-finals	19 August 2008	Blue	Hungary	Won	8	7	1
Match 6/6	Gold medal match	21 August 2008	Blue	United States	Won	9	8	1
Total	Matches played: 6 • Wins: 4 • Ties: 0 • Defeats: 2 • Win %: 66.7%					57	53	4

Source: Official Results Books (PDF): 2008 (pp. 17, 23, 25, 33, 37, 43).

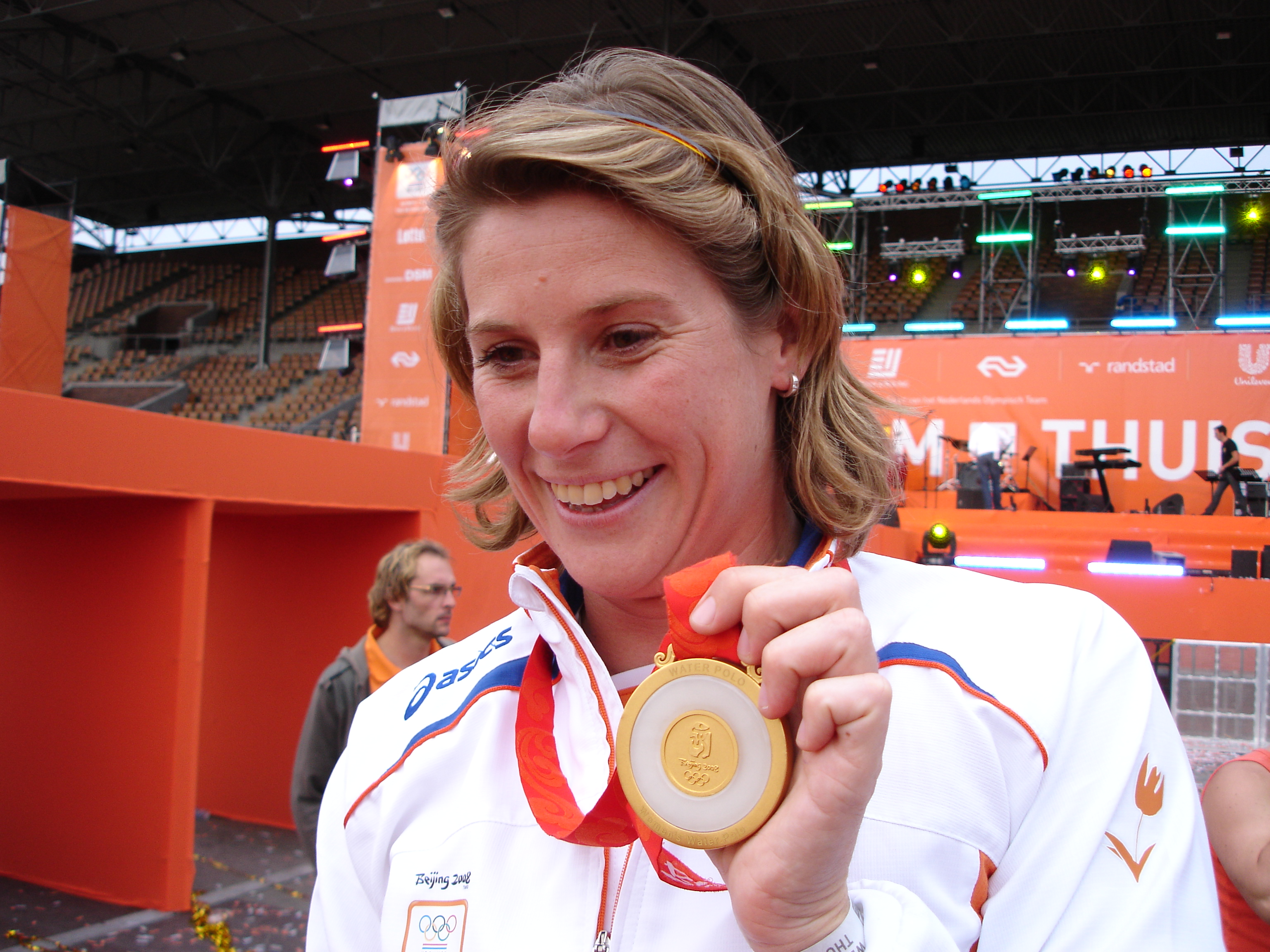
Daniëlle de Bruijn scored 17 goals at the 2008 Olympics, including seven goals in the gold medal match, helping the Netherlands win gold.

- Head coach: (Netherlands) Robin van Galen (1st title as head coach)
- Assistant coach: (Netherlands) Ilse Sindorf

Roster
Cap No.	Player	Pos	L/R	Height	Weight	Date of birth	Age of winning gold	Oly debut	ISHOF member
1	Ilse van der Meijden	GK	R	1.85 m (6 ft 1 in)	71 kg (157 lb)	22 October 1988	19 years, 304 days	Yes	
2	Yasemin Smit (C)	FP	R	1.78 m (5 ft 10 in)	70 kg (154 lb)	21 November 1984	23 years, 274 days	Yes	
3	Mieke Cabout	FP	R	1.82 m (6 ft 0 in)	70 kg (154 lb)	30 March 1986	22 years, 144 days	Yes	
4	Biurakn Hakhverdian	FP	R	1.72 m (5 ft 8 in)	65 kg (143 lb)	4 October 1985	22 years, 322 days	Yes	
5	Marieke van den Ham	FP	L	1.69 m (5 ft 7 in)	80 kg (176 lb)	21 January 1983	25 years, 213 days	Yes	
6	Daniëlle de Bruijn	FP	L	1.72 m (5 ft 8 in)	68 kg (150 lb)	13 February 1978	30 years, 190 days	No	
7	Iefke van Belkum	FP	R	1.85 m (6 ft 1 in)	75 kg (165 lb)	22 July 1986	22 years, 30 days	Yes	
8	Noeki Klein	FP	R	1.79 m (5 ft 10 in)	80 kg (176 lb)	28 April 1983	25 years, 115 days	Yes	
9	Gillian van den Berg	FP	R	1.73 m (5 ft 8 in)	66 kg (146 lb)	8 September 1971	36 years, 348 days	No	
10	Alette Sijbring	FP	R	1.74 m (5 ft 9 in)	68 kg (150 lb)	20 March 1982	26 years, 154 days	Yes	
11	Rianne Guichelaar	FP	L	1.74 m (5 ft 9 in)	63 kg (139 lb)	16 August 1983	25 years, 5 days	Yes	
12	Simone Koot	FP	R	1.73 m (5 ft 8 in)	65 kg (143 lb)	12 November 1980	27 years, 283 days	Yes	
13	Meike de Nooy	GK	R	1.85 m (6 ft 1 in)	73 kg (161 lb)	2 May 1983	25 years, 111 days	Yes	
Average				1.77 m (5 ft 10 in)	70 kg (154 lb)	17 December 1982	25 years, 248 days		
Coach	Robin van Galen								

Sources:

- Official Results Books (PDF): 2008 (p. 72);
- ISHOF.

Abbreviation

- MP – Matches played
- Min – Minutes
- G – Goals
- Sh – Shots
- AS – Assists
- TF – Turnover fouls
- ST – Steals
- BL – Blocked shots
- SP – Sprints
- 20S – 20 seconds exclusion
- Pen – Penalty
- EX – Exclusion

Statistics
Cap No.	Player	Pos	MP	Minutes played		Goals/Shots			AS	TF	ST	BL	Sprints			Personal fouls		
Cap No.	Player	Pos	MP	Min	%	G	Sh	%	AS	TF	ST	BL	Won	SP	%	20S	Pen	EX
1	Ilse van der Meijden	GK	6	198	100%	0	1	0.0%		1	3						1	
2	Yasemin Smit (C)	FP	6	131	66.2%	2	12	16.7%	4	14	5	3				10		1
3	Mieke Cabout	FP	6	178	89.9%	10	44	22.7%	1	10	9	3	0	2	0.0%	5	2	
4	Biurakn Hakhverdian	FP	6	30	15.2%	0	1	0.0%		5	2					1		
5	Marieke van den Ham	FP	6	106	53.5%	9	20	45.0%	1	4	4					5		
6	Daniëlle de Bruijn	FP	6	177	89.4%	17	33	51.5%	2	5	4	3	15	22	68.2%	9		1
7	Iefke van Belkum	FP	6	189	95.5%	10	36	27.8%		18	7	7				7		
8	Noeki Klein	FP	6	12	6.1%					3								
9	Gillian van den Berg	FP	6	125	63.1%	4	9	44.4%		5	3					1		
10	Alette Sijbring	FP	6	92	46.5%	4	18	22.2%	1	4	1	2				7	2	1
11	Rianne Guichelaar	FP	6	97	49.0%	1	13	7.7%	1	4	3					3		
12	Simone Koot	FP	6	51	25.8%	0	1	0.0%		2	3		0	2	0.0%			
13	Meike de Nooy	GK	6	0	0.0%													
Team										12								
Total			6	198	100%	57	188	30.3%	10	87	44	18	15	26	57.7%	48	5	3
Against						53	159	33.3%	16	95	41	26	11	26	42.3%	53	3	5

Cap No.	Player	Pos	Saves/Shots		
Cap No.	Player	Pos	Saves	Shots	%
1	Ilse van der Meijden	GK	45	98	45.9%
13	Meike de Nooy	GK			
Total			45	98	45.9%

Source: Official Results Books (PDF): 2008 (p. 71).

== See also ==
- Netherlands men's Olympic water polo team records and statistics
- List of women's Olympic water polo tournament records and statistics
- Lists of Olympic water polo records and statistics
- Netherlands at the Olympics

== Sources ==
=== Official Results Books (IOC) ===
PDF documents in the LA84 Foundation Digital Library:

- Official Results Book – 2000 Olympic Games – Water Polo (download, archive)
- Official Results Book – 2004 Olympic Games – Water Polo (download, archive)
- Official Results Book – 2008 Olympic Games – Water Polo (download, archive)

PDF documents on the FINA website:

- Official Results Book – 2012 Olympic Games – Diving, Swimming, Synchronised Swimming, Water Polo (archive) (pp. 284–507)

PDF documents in the Olympic World Library:

- Official Results Book – 2016 Olympic Games – Water Polo (archive)

PDF documents on the International Olympic Committee website:

- Official Results Book – 2020 Olympic Games – Water Polo (archive)
- Official Results Book – 2024 Olympic Games – Water Polo

=== Official Reports (FINA) ===
PDF documents on the FINA website:

- HistoFINA – Water polo medalists and statistics (as of September 2019) (archive) (p. 56)
- 1870–2020 | 150 years of Water Polo – Evolution of its rules (archive)

=== Official website (IOC) ===
Water polo on the International Olympic Committee website:

- Water polo
- Women's water polo

=== Olympedia ===
Water polo on the Olympedia website:

- Water polo
- Women's water polo
- Athlete count for water polo
- Water polo venues
- Water polo at the 2000 Summer Olympics (women's tournament)
- Water polo at the 2004 Summer Olympics (women's tournament)
- Water polo at the 2008 Summer Olympics (women's tournament)
- Water polo at the 2012 Summer Olympics (women's tournament)
- Water polo at the 2016 Summer Olympics (women's tournament)
- Water polo at the 2020 Summer Olympics (women's tournament)

=== Sports Reference ===
Water polo on the Sports Reference website:

- Country Medal Leaders & Athlete Medal Leaders (1900–2016) (archived)
- Women's water polo (2000–2016) (archived)
- Water polo at the 2000 Summer Games (women's tournament) (archived)
- Water polo at the 2004 Summer Games (women's tournament) (archived)
- Water polo at the 2008 Summer Games (women's tournament) (archived)
- Water polo at the 2012 Summer Games (women's tournament) (archived)
- Water polo at the 2016 Summer Games (women's tournament) (archived)

=== Todor66 ===
Water polo on the Todor66 website:

- Water polo at the Summer Games
- Water polo at the 2000 Summer Olympics (women's tournament, women's qualification)
- Water polo at the 2004 Summer Olympics (women's tournament, women's qualification)
- Water polo at the 2008 Summer Olympics (women's tournament, women's qualification)
- Water polo at the 2012 Summer Olympics (women's tournament, women's qualification)
- Water polo at the 2016 Summer Olympics (women's tournament, women's qualification)
- Water polo at the 2020 Summer Olympics (women's tournament, women's qualification)

=== ISHOF ===
International Swimming Hall of Fame (ISHOF) website:

- Honorees Listed by Category – Water Polo
- Honorees Listed by Category – Coaches
- Honorees Listed by Category – Contributors
- Honorees by Country
- Honorees By Last Name
