= List of Olympic medalists in water polo (women) =

Women's water polo became an Olympic sport at the 2000 Olympics. Since then, the United States women's team has won six consecutive medals.

There are thirty-five female athletes who have won two or more Olympic medals in water polo. Heather Petri and Brenda Villa of the United States are the only two female athletes to win four Olympic medals in water polo.

== Abbreviations ==
Rk	Rank	Ref	Reference	LH	Left-handed
Pos	Playing position	FP	Field player	GK	Goalkeeper
(C)	Captain	p.	page	pp.	pages

== Medalists by tournament ==
Games	Gold	Silver	Bronze
2000 Sydney	Australia; Liz Weekes (GK); Yvette Higgins; Gail Miller; Naomi Castle; Bronwyn Mayer; Simone Hankin; Danielle Woodhouse (GK); Kate Hooper; Debbie Watson; Taryn Woods; Bridgette Gusterson; Joanne Fox (LH); Melissa Mills	United States; Bernice Orwig (GK); Heather Petri; Ericka Lorenz; Brenda Villa; Ellen Estes; Coralie Simmons; Maureen O'Toole; Julie Ertel (C); Heather Moody; Robin Beauregard; Nicolle Payne (GK); Kathy Sheehy; Courtney Johnson	Russia; Marina Akobiya (GK); Galina Rytova (GK); Irina Tolkunova; Ekaterina Anikeeva; Svetlana Kuzina; Elena Tokun; Maria Koroleva; Elena Smurova; Tatiana Petrova; Yuliya Petrova; Sofia Konukh; Ekaterina Vassilieva; Natalia Kutuzova
2004 Athens	Italy; Francesca Conti (GK); Martina Miceli; Carmela Allucci (C); Silvia Bosurgi; Elena Gigli (GK); Emanuela Zanchi; Tania Di Mario; Cinzia Ragusa; Giusi Malato; Alexandra Araújo; Maddalena Musumeci; Melania Grego; Noémi Tóth	Greece; Georgia Ellinaki (GK); Dimitra Asilian (C); Antiopi Melidoni; Angeliki Karapataki; Kyriaki Liosi; Stavroula Kozompoli; Aikaterini Oikonomopoulou; Antigoni Roumpesi; Evangelia Moraitidou; Eftychia Karagianni; Georgia Lara; Antonia Moraiti; Anthoula Mylonaki (GK)	United States; Jacqueline Frank (GK); Heather Petri; Ericka Lorenz; Brenda Villa; Ellen Estes; Natalie Golda; Margaret Dingeldein; Kelly Rulon; Heather Moody (C); Robin Beauregard; Amber Stachowski; Nicolle Payne (GK); Thalia Munro
2008 Beijing	Netherlands; Ilse van der Meijden (GK); Yasemin Smit (C); Mieke Cabout; Biurakn Hakhverdian; Marieke van den Ham (LH); Daniëlle de Bruijn (LH); Iefke van Belkum; Noeki Klein; Gillian van den Berg; Alette Sijbring; Rianne Guichelaar (LH); Simone Koot; Meike de Nooy (GK)	United States; Elizabeth Armstrong (GK); Heather Petri; Brittany Hayes (LH); Brenda Villa (C); Lauren Wenger; Natalie Golda; Patty Cardenas; Jessica Steffens; Elsie Windes; Alison Gregorka; Moriah van Norman; Kami Craig; Jaime Komer (GK)	Australia; Emma Knox (GK); Gemma Beadsworth; Nikita Cuffe; Rebecca Rippon; Suzie Fraser (LH); Bronwen Knox; Taniele Gofers; Kate Gynther; Jenna Santoromito; Mia Santoromito; Melissa Rippon (C); Amy Hetzel; Alicia McCormack (GK)
2012 London	United States; Elizabeth Armstrong (GK); Heather Petri; Melissa Seidemann; Brenda Villa (C); Lauren Wenger; Maggie Steffens; Courtney Mathewson; Jessica Steffens; Elsie Windes; Kelly Rulon; Annika Dries; Kami Craig; Tumua Anae (GK)	Spain; Laura Ester (GK); Marta Bach; Anni Espar; Roser Tarragó; Matilde Ortiz; Jennifer Pareja (C); Lorena Miranda; Pili Peña (LH); Andrea Blas; Ona Meseguer (LH); Maica García; Laura López; Ana Copado (GK)	Australia; Victoria Brown (GK); Gemma Beadsworth; Sophie Smith; Holly Lincoln-Smith; Jane Moran; Bronwen Knox; Rowena Webster; Kate Gynther (C); Glencora Ralph; Ashleigh Southern; Melissa Rippon; Nicola Zagame; Alicia McCormack (GK)
2016 Rio de Janeiro	United States; Samantha Hill (GK); Maddie Musselman; Melissa Seidemann; Rachel Fattal; Caroline Clark; Maggie Steffens (C); Courtney Mathewson; Kiley Neushul; Aria Fischer; Kaleigh Gilchrist; Makenzie Fischer; Kami Craig; Ashleigh Johnson (GK)	Italy; Giulia Gorlero (GK); Chiara Tabani; Arianna Garibotti; Elisa Queirolo; Federica Radicchi; Rosaria Aiello; Tania Di Mario (C); Roberta Bianconi; Giulia Emmolo (LH); Francesca Pomeri; Aleksandra Cotti; Teresa Frassinetti; Laura Teani (GK)	Russia; Anna Ustyukhina (GK); Nadezhda Glyzina; Ekaterina Prokofyeva (C); Elvina Karimova; Maria Borisova; Olga Gorbunova; Ekaterina Lisunova; Anastasia Simanovich; Anna Timofeeva; Evgenia Soboleva; Evgeniya Ivanova; Anna Grineva; Anna Karnaukh (GK)
2020 Tokyo	United States; Ashleigh Johnson (GK); Maddie Musselman; Melissa Seidemann; Rachel Fattal; Paige Hauschild; Maggie Steffens (C); Stephania Haralabidis (LH); Jamie Neushul; Aria Fischer; Kaleigh Gilchrist; Makenzie Fischer; Alys Williams; Amanda Longan (GK)	Spain; Laura Ester (GK); Marta Bach; Anni Espar; Beatriz Ortiz; Elena Ruiz; Irene González; Clara Espar; Pili Peña (C, LH); Judith Forca (LH); Roser Tarragó; Maica García; Paula Leitón; Elena Sánchez (GK)	Hungary; Edina Gangl (GK); Dorottya Szilágyi; Vanda Vályi; Gréta Gurisatti; Gabriella Szűcs; Rebecca Parkes; Anna Illés; Rita Keszthelyi (C); Dóra Leimeter (LH); Anikó Gyöngyössy; Nataša Rybanská; Krisztina Garda; Alda Magyari (GK)
2024 Paris	Spain; Paula Camus; Paula Crespí; Anni Espar; Laura Ester; Judith Forca; Maica García Godoy; Paula Leitón; Beatriz Ortiz; Pili Peña; Nona Pérez; Isabel Piralkova; Elena Ruiz; Martina Terré	Australia; Abby Andrews; Charlize Andrews; Zoe Arancini; Elle Armit; Keesja Gofers; Sienna Green; Bronte Halligan; Sienna Hearn; Danijela Jackovich; Matilda Kearns; Genevieve Longman; Gabriella Palm; Alice Williams	Netherlands; Laura Aarts; Iris Wolves; Brigitte Sleeking; Sabrina van der Sloot; Maartje Keuning; Simone van de Kraats; Bente Rogge; Vivian Sevenich; Kitty-Lynn Joustra; Lieke Rogge; Lola Moolhuijzen; Nina ten Broek; Sarah Buis
2028 Los Angeles			

== Overall multiple medalists ==
As of the 2020 Summer Olympics, 35 female athletes have won three or more Olympic medals in water polo.

=== By tournament ===
The following table is pre-sorted by edition of the Olympics (in ascending order), name of the team (in ascending order), name of the player (in ascending order), respectively. Last updated: 10 August 2021.

Legend

- Team^{*} – Host team

Year	Total	Four-time Olympic medalist		Three-time Olympic medalist		Two-time Olympic medalist	
2000	0	—	0	—	0	—	0
2004	7	—	0	—	0	United States: Robin Beauregard, Ellen Estes, Ericka Lorenz, Heather Moody, Nicolle Payne (GK), Heather Petri, Brenda Villa	7
2008	3	—	0	United States: Heather Petri, Brenda Villa	2	United States: Natalie Golda	1
2012	13	United States: Heather Petri, Brenda Villa	2	—	0	Australia: Gemma Beadsworth, Kate Gynther, Bronwen Knox, Alicia McCormack (GK), Melissa Rippon; United States: Elizabeth Armstrong (GK), Kami Craig, Jessica Steffens, Kelly Rulon, Lauren Wenger, Elsie Windes	11
2016	5	—	0	United States: Kami Craig	1	Italy: Tania Di Mario; United States: Courtney Mathewson, Melissa Seidemann, Maggie Steffens	4
2020	14	—	0	United States: Melissa Seidemann, Maggie Steffens	2	Spain: Marta Bach, Anni Espar, Laura Ester (GK), Maica García, Pili Peña, Roser Tarragó; United States: Rachel Fattal, Aria Fischer, Makenzie Fischer, Kaleigh Gilchrist, Ashleigh Johnson (GK), Maddie Musselman	12
Year	Total	Four-time Olympic medalist		Three-time Olympic medalist		Two-time Olympic medalist	

Sources:

- Official Results Books (PDF): 2000 (p. 28), 2004 (p. 2), 2008 (p. 2), 2012 (p. 285), 2016 (p. 135), 2020 (p. 156).

=== By confederation ===
Last updated: 11 August 2021.

Confederation	Number of multi-time Olympic medalists			
Confederation	Four-time	Three-time	Two-time	Total
Africa – CANA	0	0	0	0
Americas – UANA	2	3	18	23
Asia – AASF	0	0	0	0
Europe – LEN	0	0	7	7
Oceania – OSA	0	0	5	5
Total	2	3	30	35

=== By team ===
Last updated: 11 August 2021.

Women's team	Number of multi-time Olympians				Confederation
Women's team	Four-time	Three-time	Two-time	Total	Confederation
Australia	0	0	5	5	Oceania – OSA
Italy	0	0	1	1	Europe – LEN
Spain	0	0	6	6	Europe – LEN
United States	2	3	18	23	Americas – UANA
Total	2	3	30	35	

=== By position ===
Last updated: 11 August 2021.

Position	Number of multi-time Olympians			
Position	Four-time	Three-time	Two-time	Total
Field player	2	3	25	30
Goalkeeper	0	0	5	5
Total	2	3	30	35

=== Four or more Olympic medals ===
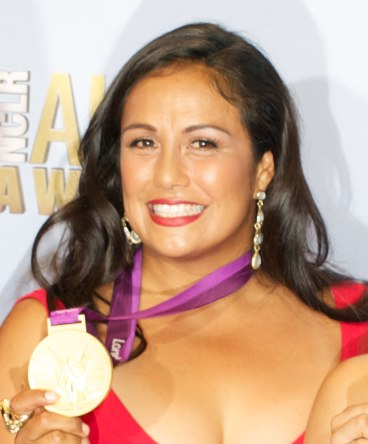
Brenda Villa of the United States won four Olympic medals in water polo between 2000 and 2012.

The following table is pre-sorted by total number of Olympic medals (in descending order), number of Olympic gold medals (in descending order), number of Olympic silver medals (in descending order), year of receiving the last Olympic medal (in ascending order), year of receiving the first Olympic medal (in ascending order), name of the player (in ascending order), respectively. Last updated: 7 August 2021.

Heather Petri and Brenda Villa, both representing the United States, are the only two female athletes to win four Olympic medals in water polo.

Legend

- – Hosts

Female athletes who won four or more Olympic medals in water polo
Rk	Player	Birth	Height	Women's team	Pos	Water polo tournaments					Period (age of first/last)	Medals				Ref
Rk	Player	Birth	Height	Women's team	Pos	1	2	3	4	5	Period (age of first/last)	G	S	B	T	Ref
1	Heather Petri	1978	1.80 m (5 ft 11 in)	United States	FP	2000	2004	2008	2012		12 years (22/34)	1	2	1	4	
1	Brenda Villa	1980	1.63 m (5 ft 4 in)	United States	FP	2000	2004	2008	2012		12 years (20/32)	1	2	1	4	

Sources:

- Sports Reference: Athlete Medal Leaders (1900–2016);
- Official Results Books (PDF): 2000 (p. 28), 2004 (p. 2), 2008 (p. 2), 2012 (p. 285), 2016 (p. 135), 2020 (p. 156).

=== Three Olympic medals ===
The following table is pre-sorted by number of Olympic gold medals (in descending order), number of Olympic silver medals (in descending order), year of receiving the last Olympic medal (in ascending order), year of receiving the first Olympic medal (in ascending order), name of the player (in ascending order), respectively. Last updated: 10 August 2021.

Three female athletes won three Olympic medals in water polo.

Legend

- – Hosts

Female athletes who won three Olympic medals in water polo
Rk	Player	Birth	Height	Women's team	Pos	Water polo tournaments					Period (age of first/last)	Medals				Ref
Rk	Player	Birth	Height	Women's team	Pos	1	2	3	4	5	Period (age of first/last)	G	S	B	T	Ref
3	Melissa Seidemann	1990	1.83 m (6 ft 0 in)	United States	FP	2012	2016	2020			9 years (22/31)	3	0	0	3	
3	Maggie Steffens	1993	1.73 m (5 ft 8 in)	United States	FP	2012	2016	2020			9 years (19/28)	3	0	0	3	
5	Kami Craig	1987	1.81 m (5 ft 11 in)	United States	FP	2008	2012	2016			8 years (21/29)	2	1	0	3	

- Official Results Books (PDF): 2000 (p. 28), 2004 (p. 2), 2008 (p. 2), 2012 (p. 285), 2016 (p. 135), 2020 (p. 156).

=== Two Olympic medals ===
The following table is pre-sorted by number of Olympic gold medals (in descending order), number of Olympic silver medals (in descending order), year of receiving the last Olympic medal (in ascending order), year of receiving the first Olympic medal (in ascending order), name of the player (in ascending order), respectively. Last updated: 11 August 2021.

Thirty female athletes won two Olympic medals in water polo.

Legend

- – Hosts

Female athletes who won two Olympic medals in water polo
Rk	Player	Birth	Height	Women's team	Pos	Water polo tournaments					Period (age of first/last)	Medals				Ref
Rk	Player	Birth	Height	Women's team	Pos	1	2	3	4	5	Period (age of first/last)	G	S	B	T	Ref
6	Courtney Mathewson	1986	1.71 m (5 ft 7 in)	United States	FP	2012	2016				4 years (25/29)	2	0	0	2	
6	Rachel Fattal	1993	1.73 m (5 ft 8 in)	United States	FP	2016	2020				5 years (22/27)	2	0	0	2	
6	Aria Fischer	1999	1.83 m (6 ft 0 in)	United States	FP	2016	2020				5 years (17/22)	2	0	0	2	
6	Makenzie Fischer	1997	1.85 m (6 ft 1 in)	United States	FP	2016	2020				5 years (19/24)	2	0	0	2	
6	Kaleigh Gilchrist	1992	1.75 m (5 ft 9 in)	United States	FP	2016	2020				5 years (24/29)	2	0	0	2	
6	Ashleigh Johnson	1994	1.85 m (6 ft 1 in)	United States	GK	2016	2020				5 years (21/26)	2	0	0	2	
6	Maddie Musselman	1998	1.80 m (5 ft 11 in)	United States	FP	2016	2020				5 years (18/23)	2	0	0	2	
13	Elizabeth Armstrong	1983	1.88 m (6 ft 2 in)	United States	GK	2008	2012				4 years (25/29)	1	1	0	2	
13	Jessica Steffens	1987	1.83 m (6 ft 0 in)	United States	FP	2008	2012				4 years (21/25)	1	1	0	2	
13	Lauren Wenger	1984	1.91 m (6 ft 3 in)	United States	FP	2008	2012				4 years (24/28)	1	1	0	2	
13	Elsie Windes	1985	1.78 m (5 ft 10 in)	United States	FP	2008	2012				4 years (23/27)	1	1	0	2	
13	Tania Di Mario	1979	1.68 m (5 ft 6 in)	Italy	FP	2004	2008	2012	2016		12 years (25/37)	1	1	0	2	
18	Kelly Rulon	1984	1.78 m (5 ft 10 in)	United States	FP	2004		2012			8 years (20/27)	1	0	1	2	
19	Marta Bach	1993	1.76 m (5 ft 9 in)	Spain	FP	2012	2016	2020			9 years (19/28)	0	2	0	2	
19	Anni Espar	1993	1.80 m (5 ft 11 in)	Spain	FP	2012	2016	2020			9 years (19/28)	0	2	0	2	
19	Laura Ester	1990	1.72 m (5 ft 8 in)	Spain	GK	2012	2016	2020			9 years (22/31)	0	2	0	2	
19	Maica García	1990	1.88 m (6 ft 2 in)	Spain	FP	2012	2016	2020			9 years (21/30)	0	2	0	2	
19	Pili Peña	1986	1.75 m (5 ft 9 in)	Spain	FP	2012	2016	2020			9 years (26/35)	0	2	0	2	
19	Roser Tarragó	1993	1.71 m (5 ft 7 in)	Spain	FP	2012	2016	2020			9 years (19/28)	0	2	0	2	
25	Robin Beauregard	1979	1.75 m (5 ft 9 in)	United States	FP	2000	2004				4 years (21/25)	0	1	1	2	
25	Ellen Estes	1978	1.82 m (6 ft 0 in)	United States	FP	2000	2004				4 years (21/25)	0	1	1	2	
25	Ericka Lorenz	1981	1.80 m (5 ft 11 in)	United States	FP	2000	2004				4 years (19/23)	0	1	1	2	
25	Heather Moody	1973	1.82 m (6 ft 0 in)	United States	FP	2000	2004				4 years (27/31)	0	1	1	2	
25	Nicolle Payne	1976	1.75 m (5 ft 9 in)	United States	GK	2000	2004				4 years (24/28)	0	1	1	2	
25	Natalie Golda	1981	1.80 m (5 ft 11 in)	United States	FP	2004	2008				4 years (22/26)	0	1	1	2	
31	Gemma Beadsworth	1987	1.80 m (5 ft 11 in)	Australia	FP	2008	2012	2016			8 years (21/29)	0	0	2	2	
31	Kate Gynther	1982	1.75 m (5 ft 9 in)	Australia	FP	2004	2008	2012			8 years (22/30)	0	0	2	2	
31	Bronwen Knox	1986	1.82 m (6 ft 0 in)	Australia	FP	2008	2012	2016	2020		13 years (22/35)	0	0	2	2	
31	Alicia McCormack	1983	1.68 m (5 ft 6 in)	Australia	GK	2008	2012				4 years (25/29)	0	0	2	2	
31	Melissa Rippon	1981	1.69 m (5 ft 7 in)	Australia	FP	2004	2008	2012			8 years (23/31)	0	0	2	2	
Rk	Player	Birth	Height	Women's team	Pos	1	2	3	4	5	Period (age of first/last)	G	S	B	T	Ref
Rk	Player	Birth	Height	Women's team	Pos	Water polo tournaments					Period (age of first/last)	Medals				Ref

- Official Results Books (PDF): 2000 (p. 28), 2004 (p. 2), 2008 (p. 2), 2012 (p. 285), 2016 (p. 135), 2020 (p. 156).

=== Multiple medalists by team ===
The following tables are pre-sorted by total number of Olympic medals (in descending order), number of Olympic gold medals (in descending order), number of Olympic silver medals (in descending order), year of receiving the last Olympic medal (in ascending order), year of receiving the first Olympic medal (in ascending order), name of the player (in ascending order), respectively.

Legend

- Year^{*} – As host team

==== Australia ====
- Women's national team: Australia
- Team appearances: 6 (2000^{*}–2020)
- As host team: 2000^{*}

* Number of three-time Olympic medalists: 0

- Number of two-time Olympic medalists: 5
- Last updated: 11 August 2021.

Legend

- – Hosts

Female athletes who won two or more Olympic medals in water polo
Rk	Player	Birth	Height	Pos	Water polo tournaments					Period (age of first/last)	Medals				Ref
Rk	Player	Birth	Height	Pos	1	2	3	4	5	Period (age of first/last)	G	S	B	T	Ref
1	Gemma Beadsworth	1987	1.80 m (5 ft 11 in)	FP	2008	2012	2016			8 years (21/29)	0	0	2	2	
1	Kate Gynther	1982	1.75 m (5 ft 9 in)	FP	2004	2008	2012			8 years (22/30)	0	0	2	2	
1	Bronwen Knox	1986	1.82 m (6 ft 0 in)	FP	2008	2012	2016	2020		13 years (22/35)	0	0	2	2	
1	Alicia McCormack	1983	1.68 m (5 ft 6 in)	GK	2008	2012				4 years (25/29)	0	0	2	2	
1	Melissa Rippon	1981	1.69 m (5 ft 7 in)	FP	2004	2008	2012			8 years (23/31)	0	0	2	2	

==== Greece ====
- Women's national team: Greece
- Team appearances: 2 (2004^{*}–2008)
- As host team: 2004^{*}

* Number of three-time Olympic medalists: 0

- Number of two-time Olympic medalists: 0
- Last updated: 1 May 2021.

==== Hungary ====
- Women's national team: Hungary
- Team appearances: 5 (2004–2020)
- As host team: —

* Number of three-time Olympic medalists: 0

- Number of two-time Olympic medalists: 0
- Last updated: 7 August 2021.

==== Italy ====
- Women's national team: Italy
- Team appearances: 4 (2004–2016)
- As host team: —

* Number of three-time Olympic medalists: 0

- Number of two-time Olympic medalists: 1
- Last updated: 1 May 2021.

Female athletes who won two or more Olympic medals in water polo
Rk	Player	Birth	Height	Pos	Water polo tournaments					Period (age of first/last)	Medals				Ref
Rk	Player	Birth	Height	Pos	1	2	3	4	5	Period (age of first/last)	G	S	B	T	Ref
1	Tania Di Mario	1979	1.68 m (5 ft 6 in)	FP	2004	2008	2012	2016		12 years (25/37)	1	1	0	2	

==== Netherlands ====
- Women's national team: Netherlands
- Team appearances: 3 (2000, 2008, 2020)
- As host team: —

* Number of three-time Olympic medalists: 0

- Number of two-time Olympic medalists: 0
- Last updated: 1 May 2021.

==== Russia ====
- Women's national team: Russia
- Team appearances: 6 (2000–2020)
- As host team: —

* Number of three-time Olympic medalists: 0

- Number of two-time Olympic medalists: 0
- Last updated: 1 May 2021.

==== Spain ====
- Women's national team: Spain
- Team appearances: 3 (2012–2020)
- As host team: —

* Number of three-time Olympic medalists: 0

- Number of two-time Olympic medalists: 6
- Last updated: 10 August 2021.

Legend

- – Hosts

Female athletes who won two or more Olympic medals in water polo
Rk	Player	Birth	Height	Pos	Water polo tournaments					Period (age of first/last)	Medals				Ref
Rk	Player	Birth	Height	Pos	1	2	3	4	5	Period (age of first/last)	G	S	B	T	Ref
1	Marta Bach	1993	1.76 m (5 ft 9 in)	FP	2012	2016	2020			9 years (19/28)	0	2	0	2	
1	Anni Espar	1993	1.80 m (5 ft 11 in)	FP	2012	2016	2020			9 years (19/28)	0	2	0	2	
1	Laura Ester	1990	1.72 m (5 ft 8 in)	GK	2012	2016	2020			9 years (22/31)	0	2	0	2	
1	Maica García	1990	1.88 m (6 ft 2 in)	FP	2012	2016	2020			9 years (21/30)	0	2	0	2	
1	Pili Peña	1986	1.75 m (5 ft 9 in)	FP	2012	2016	2020			9 years (26/35)	0	2	0	2	
1	Roser Tarragó	1993	1.71 m (5 ft 7 in)	FP	2012	2016	2020			9 years (19/28)	0	2	0	2	

==== United States ====
- Women's national team: United States
- Team appearances: 6 (2000–2020)
- As host team: —

* Number of four-time Olympic medalists: 2

- Number of three-time Olympic medalists: 3
- Number of two-time Olympic medalists: 18
- Last updated: 10 August 2021.

Legend

- – Hosts

Female athletes who won two or more Olympic medals in water polo
Rk	Player	Birth	Height	Pos	Water polo tournaments					Period (age of first/last)	Medals				Ref
Rk	Player	Birth	Height	Pos	1	2	3	4	5	Period (age of first/last)	G	S	B	T	Ref
1	Heather Petri	1978	1.80 m (5 ft 11 in)	FP	2000	2004	2008	2012		12 years (22/34)	1	2	1	4	
1	Brenda Villa	1980	1.63 m (5 ft 4 in)	FP	2000	2004	2008	2012		12 years (20/32)	1	2	1	4	
3	Melissa Seidemann	1990	1.83 m (6 ft 0 in)	FP	2012	2016	2020			9 years (22/31)	3	0	0	3	
3	Maggie Steffens	1993	1.73 m (5 ft 8 in)	FP	2012	2016	2020			9 years (19/28)	3	0	0	3	
5	Kami Craig	1987	1.81 m (5 ft 11 in)	FP	2008	2012	2016			8 years (21/29)	2	1	0	3	
6	Courtney Mathewson	1986	1.71 m (5 ft 7 in)	FP	2012	2016				4 years (25/29)	2	0	0	2	
6	Rachel Fattal	1993	1.73 m (5 ft 8 in)	FP	2016	2020				5 years (22/27)	2	0	0	2	
6	Aria Fischer	1999	1.83 m (6 ft 0 in)	FP	2016	2020				5 years (17/22)	2	0	0	2	
6	Makenzie Fischer	1997	1.85 m (6 ft 1 in)	FP	2016	2020				5 years (19/24)	2	0	0	2	
6	Kaleigh Gilchrist	1992	1.75 m (5 ft 9 in)	FP	2016	2020				5 years (24/29)	2	0	0	2	
6	Ashleigh Johnson	1994	1.85 m (6 ft 1 in)	GK	2016	2020				5 years (21/26)	2	0	0	2	
6	Maddie Musselman	1998	1.80 m (5 ft 11 in)	FP	2016	2020				5 years (18/23)	2	0	0	2	
13	Elizabeth Armstrong	1983	1.88 m (6 ft 2 in)	GK	2008	2012				4 years (25/29)	1	1	0	2	
13	Jessica Steffens	1987	1.83 m (6 ft 0 in)	FP	2008	2012				4 years (21/25)	1	1	0	2	
13	Lauren Wenger	1984	1.91 m (6 ft 3 in)	FP	2008	2012				4 years (24/28)	1	1	0	2	
13	Elsie Windes	1985	1.78 m (5 ft 10 in)	FP	2008	2012				4 years (23/27)	1	1	0	2	
17	Kelly Rulon	1984	1.78 m (5 ft 10 in)	FP	2004		2012			8 years (20/27)	1	0	1	2	
18	Robin Beauregard	1979	1.75 m (5 ft 9 in)	FP	2000	2004				4 years (21/25)	0	1	1	2	
18	Ellen Estes	1978	1.82 m (6 ft 0 in)	FP	2000	2004				4 years (21/25)	0	1	1	2	
18	Ericka Lorenz	1981	1.80 m (5 ft 11 in)	FP	2000	2004				4 years (19/23)	0	1	1	2	
18	Heather Moody	1973	1.82 m (6 ft 0 in)	FP	2000	2004				4 years (27/31)	0	1	1	2	
18	Nicolle Payne	1976	1.75 m (5 ft 9 in)	GK	2000	2004				4 years (24/28)	0	1	1	2	
18	Natalie Golda	1981	1.80 m (5 ft 11 in)	FP	2004	2008				4 years (22/26)	0	1	1	2	
Rk	Player	Birth	Height	Pos	1	2	3	4	5	Period (age of first/last)	G	S	B	T	Ref
Rk	Player	Birth	Height	Pos	Water polo tournaments					Period (age of first/last)	Medals				Ref

== See also ==
- Water polo at the Summer Olympics
- Lists of Olympic water polo records and statistics
  - List of men's Olympic water polo tournament records and statistics
  - List of women's Olympic water polo tournament records and statistics
  - List of Olympic champions in men's water polo
  - List of Olympic champions in women's water polo
  - National team appearances in the men's Olympic water polo tournament
  - National team appearances in the women's Olympic water polo tournament
  - List of players who have appeared in multiple men's Olympic water polo tournaments
  - List of players who have appeared in multiple women's Olympic water polo tournaments
  - List of Olympic medalists in water polo (men)
  - List of men's Olympic water polo tournament top goalscorers
  - List of women's Olympic water polo tournament top goalscorers
  - List of men's Olympic water polo tournament goalkeepers
  - List of women's Olympic water polo tournament goalkeepers
  - List of Olympic venues in water polo
- List of World Aquatics Championships medalists in water polo

== Sources ==
=== Official Results Books (IOC) ===
PDF documents in the LA84 Foundation Digital Library:

- Official Results Book – 2000 Olympic Games – Water Polo (download, archive)
- Official Results Book – 2004 Olympic Games – Water Polo (download, archive)
- Official Results Book – 2008 Olympic Games – Water Polo (download, archive)

PDF documents on the FINA website:

- Official Results Book – 2012 Olympic Games – Diving, Swimming, Synchronised Swimming, Water Polo (archive) (pp. 284–507)

PDF documents in the Olympic World Library:

- Official Results Book – 2016 Olympic Games – Water Polo (archive)

PDF documents on the International Olympic Committee website:

- Official Results Book – 2020 Olympic Games – Water Polo (archive)
- Official Results Book – 2024 Olympic Games – Water Polo

=== Official Reports (FINA) ===
PDF documents on the FINA website:

- HistoFINA – Water polo medalists and statistics (as of September 2019) (archive) (p. 56)
- 1870–2020 | 150 years of Water Polo – Evolution of its rules (archive)

=== Official website (IOC) ===
Water polo on the International Olympic Committee website:

- Water polo
- Women's water polo

=== Olympedia ===
Water polo on the Olympedia website:

- Water polo
- Women's water polo
- Athlete count for water polo
- Water polo venues
- Water polo at the 2000 Summer Olympics (women's tournament)
- Water polo at the 2004 Summer Olympics (women's tournament)
- Water polo at the 2008 Summer Olympics (women's tournament)
- Water polo at the 2012 Summer Olympics (women's tournament)
- Water polo at the 2016 Summer Olympics (women's tournament)
- Water polo at the 2020 Summer Olympics (women's tournament)

=== Sports Reference ===
Water polo on the Sports Reference website:

- Country Medal Leaders & Athlete Medal Leaders (1900–2016) (archived)
- Women's water polo (2000–2016) (archived)
- Water polo at the 2000 Summer Games (women's tournament) (archived)
- Water polo at the 2004 Summer Games (women's tournament) (archived)
- Water polo at the 2008 Summer Games (women's tournament) (archived)
- Water polo at the 2012 Summer Games (women's tournament) (archived)
- Water polo at the 2016 Summer Games (women's tournament) (archived)

=== Todor66 ===
Water polo on the Todor66 website:

- Water polo at the Summer Games
- Water polo at the 2000 Summer Olympics (women's tournament, women's qualification)
- Water polo at the 2004 Summer Olympics (women's tournament, women's qualification)
- Water polo at the 2008 Summer Olympics (women's tournament, women's qualification)
- Water polo at the 2012 Summer Olympics (women's tournament, women's qualification)
- Water polo at the 2016 Summer Olympics (women's tournament, women's qualification)
- Water polo at the 2020 Summer Olympics (women's tournament, women's qualification)
