= Rianne Guichelaar =

Dutch water polo player (born 1983)

Personal information
- Born: 16 August 1983 (age 43) Enschede, Netherlands

Sport
- Sport: Water polo
Medal record
Representing the Netherlands
Olympic Games
Gold medal – first place	2008 Beijing	Team competition
European Championships
Bronze medal – third place	2010 Zagreb	Team competition

Rianne Guichelaar (born 16 August 1983) is a water polo player of the Netherlands who represents the Dutch national team in international competitions.

Guichelaar was part of the team that became fifth at the 2001 Women's European Water Polo Championship in Budapest. They became 9th at the 2001 FINA Women's World Water Polo Championship in Fukuoka and sixth at the 2003 World Aquatics Championships in Barcelona. The Dutch team failed to qualify for the 2004 Summer Olympics and finished 10th at the 2005 World Aquatics Championships in Montreal. At the 2006 FINA Women's Water Polo World League in Cosenza and the 2006 Women's European Water Polo Championship in Belgrade they finished in fifth place, followed by the 9th spot at the 2007 World Aquatics Championships in Melbourne. The Dutch team finished in fifth place at the 2008 Women's European Water Polo Championship in Málaga and they qualified for the 2008 Summer Olympics in Beijing. There they ended up winning the gold medal on 21 August, beating the United States 9–8 in the final.

== See also ==
- Netherlands women's Olympic water polo team records and statistics
- List of Olympic champions in women's water polo
- List of Olympic medalists in water polo (women)
