= Amy Hetzel =

Australian water polo player

Amy Jones (nee Hetzel)
Personal information
- Born: 27 April 1983 (age 43) Rockhampton, Queensland, Australia

Sport
- Sport: Water polo
Medal record
Representing Australia
Olympic Games
Bronze medal – third place	2008 Beijing	Team competition
World Championships
Silver medal – second place	2007 Melbourne	Team competition

Amy Hetzel (born 27 April 1983) is an Australian former water polo player and television sports presenter. She was a member of the Australia women's national water polo team that won a bronze medal at the 2008 Beijing Olympics, and silver at the 2007 World Championships in Melbourne.

== Early life ==
Hetzel was born on 27 April 1983 in Rockhampton, Queensland. She completed secondary school education at Brisbane State High School.

== Career ==
She has previously worked as a sports reporter and producer on Sports Tonight for Network Ten and ONE HD. She currently works as a sports presenter and producer for the Australian Broadcasting Corporation (ABC) News24.

Hetzel is a member of the board of directors for the NSW Institute of Sport (NSWIS). She was also appointed by the Australian Olympic Committee (AOC) as deputy Chef de Mission to lead Australia's Solomon Islands 2023 Pacific Games team.

== See also ==
- List of Olympic medalists in water polo (women)
- List of World Aquatics Championships medalists in water polo
