= Meike de Nooy =

Dutch water polo player (born 1983)

Personal information
- Born: 2 May 1983 (age 43) Eindhoven, Netherlands

Sport
- Sport: Water polo
Medal record
Representing the Netherlands
Olympic Games
Gold medal – first place	2008 Beijing	Team competition

Meike de Nooy (born 2 May 1983) is a water polo player of the Netherlands who represents the Dutch national team in international competitions.

De Nooy was part of the team that became sixth at the 2003 World Aquatics Championships in Barcelona. She also was in the team that became tenth at the 2005 World Aquatics Championships in Montreal and at the 2007 World Aquatics Championships in Melbourne where they finished in 9th position. They started a new campaign with a mix of experienced and talented players to work towards a new top team for the 2012 Summer Olympics in London. The Dutch team finished in fifth place at the 2008 Women's European Water Polo Championship in Málaga and they qualified for the 2008 Summer Olympics in Beijing. There they ended up winning the gold medal on 21 August, beating the United States 9–8 in the final.

== See also ==
- Netherlands women's Olympic water polo team records and statistics
- List of Olympic champions in women's water polo
- List of Olympic medalists in water polo (women)
- List of women's Olympic water polo tournament goalkeepers
- List of World Aquatics Championships medalists in water polo
