= Jenna Santoromito =

Australian water polo player

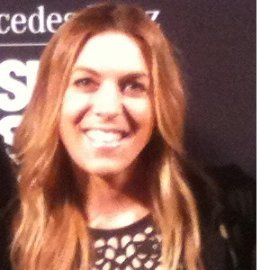

Personal information
- Born: 21 January 1987 (age 39) Sydney, Australia

Sport
- Sport: Water polo
Medal record
Women's water polo
Representing Australia
Olympic Games
Bronze medal – third place	2008 Beijing	Team competition

Jenna Santoromito (born 21 January 1987) is an Australian former water polo player. She was a member of the Australia women's national water polo team that won a bronze medal at the 2008 Beijing Olympics.

== See also ==
- List of Olympic medalists in water polo (women)
