= Ekaterina Tankeeva =

Russian water polo player

Personal information
- Nationality: Russian
- Born: April 28, 1988 (age 38) Moscow, Soviet Union

Sport
- Country: Russia
- Sport: Water polo
Medal record
Women's water polo
Representing Russia
World Championships
Bronze medal – third place	2011 Shanghai	Team competition
European Championships
Gold medal – first place	2010 Zagreb	Team competition
Universiade
Bronze medal – third place	2009 Belgrade	Team

Ekaterina Tankeeva (Russian: Екатерина Ивановна Танкеева; born 28 June 1989, Moscow) is a Russian water polo player. At the 2012 Summer Olympics, she competed for the Russia women's national water polo team in the women's event. She is 1.68 m (5 ft 6 in) tall.

== See also ==
- List of World Aquatics Championships medalists in water polo
