= Noeki Klein =

Dutch water polo player (born 1983)

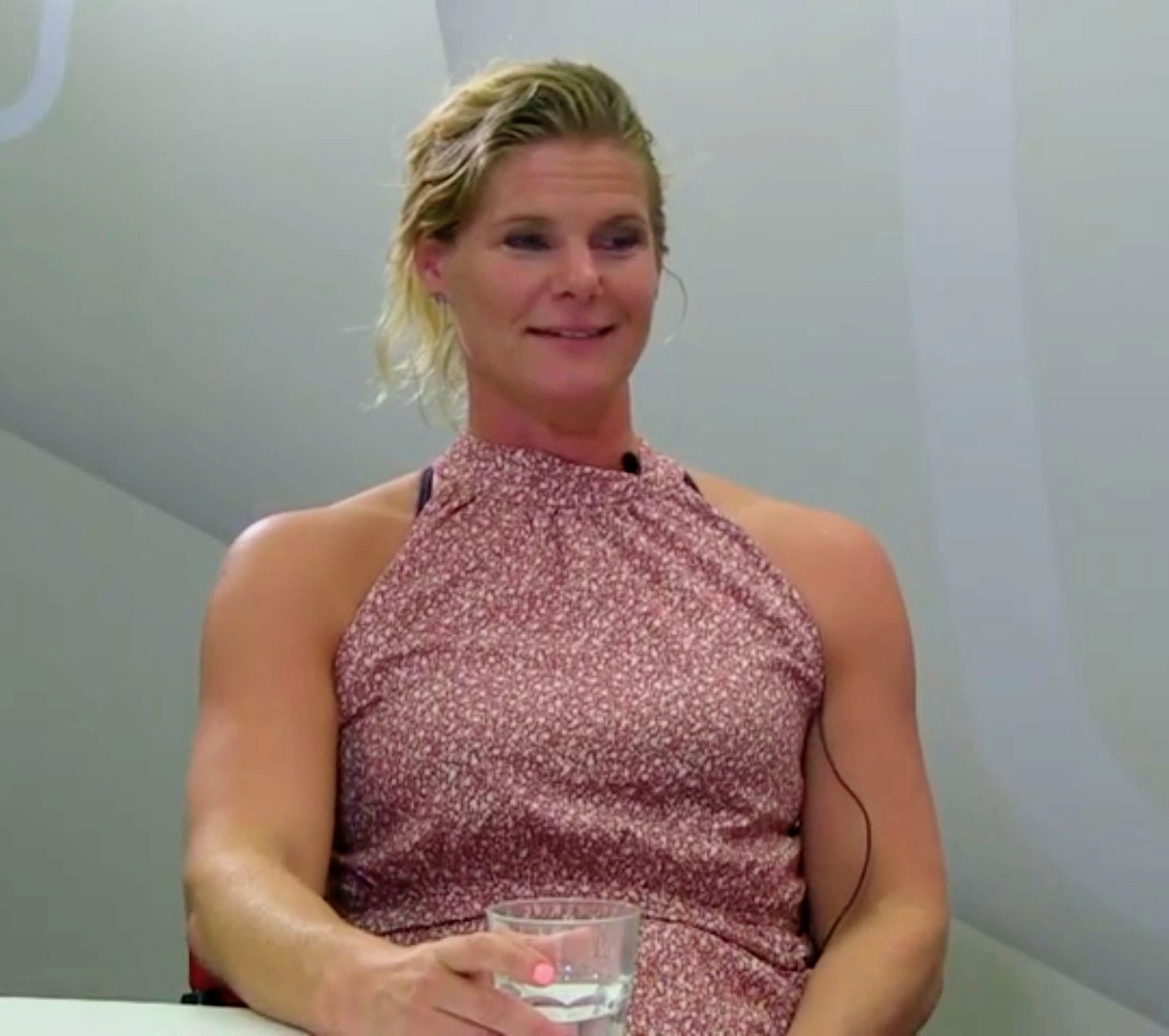
- Klein in 2021

Personal information
- Born: 28 April 1983 (age 43) Leiderdorp, Netherlands

Sport
- Sport: Water polo
Medal record
Representing the Netherlands
Olympic Games
Gold medal – first place	2008 Beijing	Team competition
European Championships
Bronze medal – third place	2010 Zagreb	Team competition

Noeki Klein (born 28 April 1983) is a water polo player of the Netherlands who represents the Dutch national team in international competitions.

Klein was part of the team that became 10th at the 2005 World Aquatics Championships in Montreal. At the 2006 FINA Women's Water Polo World League in Cosenza and the 2006 Women's European Water Polo Championship in Belgrade they finished in fifth place, followed by the 9th spot at the 2007 World Aquatics Championships in Melbourne. The Dutch team finished in fifth place at the 2008 Women's European Water Polo Championship in Málaga and they qualified for the 2008 Summer Olympics in Beijing. There they ended up winning the gold medal on 21 August, beating the United States 9–8 in the final.

From 2008 to 2010 Klein played two seasons for Spanish record champion CN Sabadell. She retired as Dutch international in 2011.

== See also ==
- Netherlands women's Olympic water polo team records and statistics
- List of Olympic champions in women's water polo
- List of Olympic medalists in water polo (women)
