= Mia Santoromito =

Australian water polo player

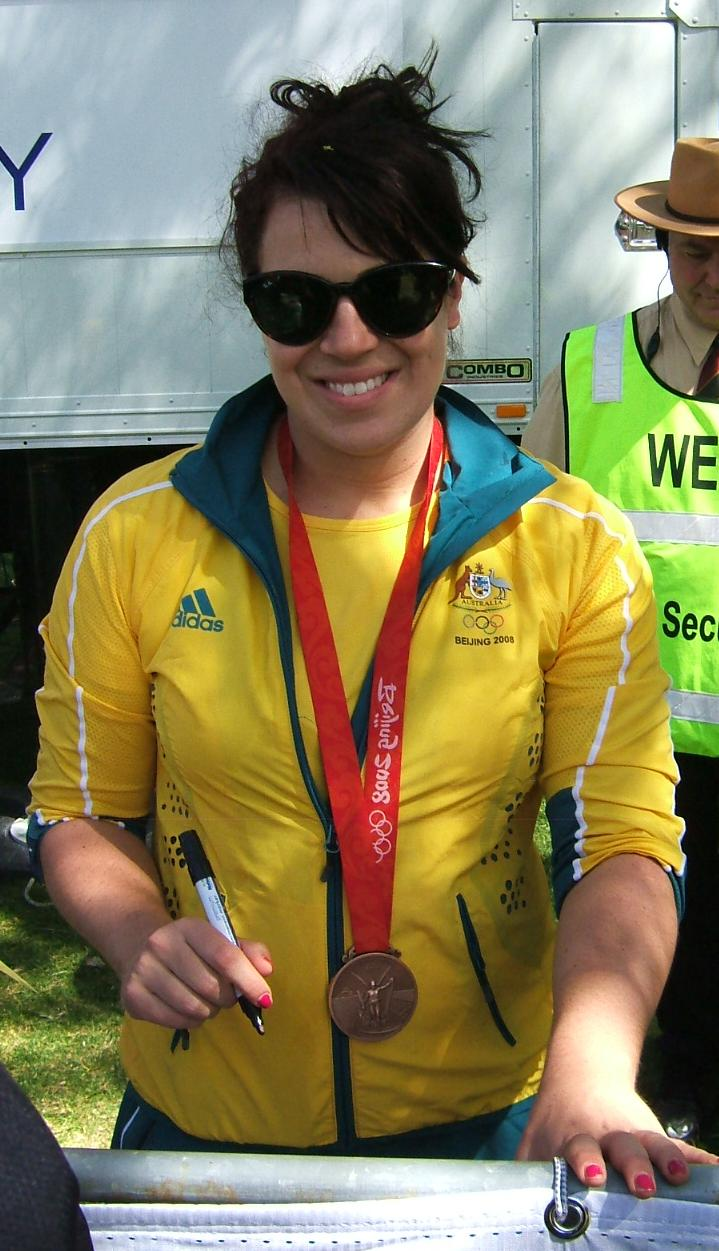

Personal information
- Born: 29 March 1985 (age 41) Sydney, Australia

Sport
- Sport: Water polo
Medal record
Women's water polo
Representing Australia
Olympic Games
Bronze medal – third place	2008 Beijing	Team competition
World Championships
Silver medal – second place	2007 Melbourne	Team competition

Mia Santoromito (born 29 March 1985) is an Australian water polo player. She was a member of the Australia women's national water polo team that won a bronze medal at the 2008 Beijing Olympics.

== See also ==
- List of Olympic medalists in water polo (women)
- List of World Aquatics Championships medalists in water polo
