= Ilse van der Meijden =

Dutch water polo player (born 1988)

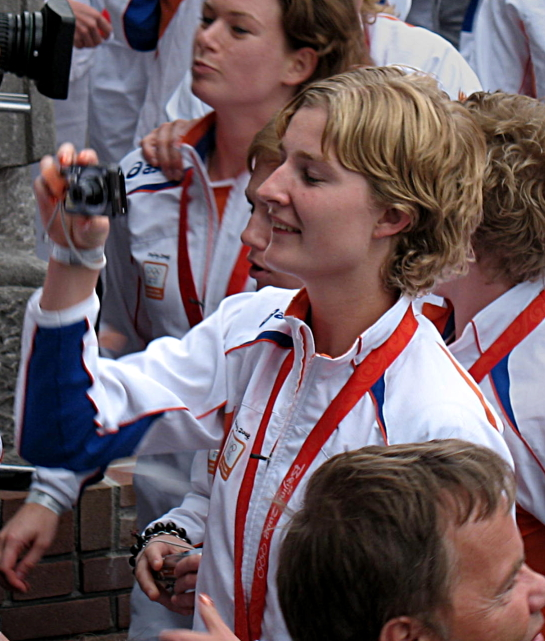

Personal information
- Full name: Ilse Suzanne van der Meijden
- Born: 22 October 1988 (age 37) Baarn, Netherlands
- Height: 1.85 m (6 ft 1 in)
- Weight: 71 kg (157 lb; 11 st 3 lb)
Medal record
Women's water polo
Representing the Netherlands
Olympic Games
Gold medal – first place	2008 Beijing	Team competition
European Championships
Bronze medal – third place	2010 Zagreb	Team competition

Ilse Suzanne van der Meijden (born 22 October 1988) is a water polo player of the Netherlands who represents the Dutch national team in international competitions.

Van der Meijden was part of the team that became fifth at the 2006 FINA Women's Water Polo World League in Cosenza. With her in the team they also became fifth at the 2006 Women's European Water Polo Championship in Belgrade, followed by the 9th spot at the 2007 World Aquatics Championships in Melbourne. The Dutch team finished in fifth place at the 2008 Women's European Water Polo Championship in Málaga and they qualified for the 2008 Summer Olympics in Beijing. There they ended up winning the gold medal on 21 August, beating the United States 9–8 in the final.

Due to her injuries, only a few weeks before 2012 Women's European Water Polo Championship had Van der Meijden back in training. During the Championship in Eindhoven, the team came no further than sixth place.

After the 2013–2014 season, Van der Meijden became a coach of HZC De Robben and BZC Brandenburg.

== See also ==
- Netherlands women's Olympic water polo team records and statistics
- List of Olympic champions in women's water polo
- List of Olympic medalists in water polo (women)
- List of women's Olympic water polo tournament goalkeepers
- List of World Aquatics Championships medalists in water polo
