= Biurakn Hakhverdian =

Dutch water polo player (born 1985)

Personal information
- Born: 4 October 1985 (age 40) Leiden, Netherlands

Sport
- Sport: Water polo
Medal record
Representing the Netherlands
Olympic Games
Gold medal – first place	2008 Beijing	Team competition
European Championships
Bronze medal – third place	2010 Zagreb	Team competition

Biurakn Hakhverdian (Armenian: Բյուրակն Հախվերդյան; born 4 October 1985) is a Dutch water polo player who represents the Dutch national team in international competitions. She is of Iranian Armenian descent.

== Life ==
Hakhverdian was born in Leiden, where she began her water polo career playing for ZVL Leiden. In 2000, she rose to national level as she was selected for the national Dutch junior women's team. Two years later, she became the captain of the Dutch national junior women's team.

Since 2004, she has been playing for the Dutch national senior women's team. In 2005, Hakhverdian stopped playing for ZVL and signed a contract with Ethnikos Piraeus (Athens, Greece), but returned within three months after internal mismanagement. Upon her return to the Netherlands, Hakhverdian signed a contract with Polar Bears. In 2012, she returned to ZVL and she finished her waterpolo career in 2013 after the World Championship in Barcelona.

Hakhverdian was part of the Dutch team that finished 10th at the 2005 World Aquatics Championships in Montreal. At the 2006 FINA Women's Water Polo World League in Cosenza and the 2006 Women's European Water Polo Championship in Belgrade they finished in 5th place, followed by the 9th spot at the 2007 World Aquatics Championships in Melbourne, and 5th at the 2009 World Aquatics Championships. The Dutch team finished in fifth place at the 2008 Women's European Water Polo Championship in Málaga and they qualified for the 2008 Summer Olympics in Beijing. There they won the gold medal on 21 August, beating the United States 9–8 in the final. In Barcelona at the 2013 World Aquatics Championships the team lost in the quarter-finals.

== See also ==
- Netherlands women's Olympic water polo team records and statistics
- List of Olympic champions in women's water polo
- List of Olympic medalists in water polo (women)
