= Simone Koot =

Dutch water polo player (born 1980)

Personal information
- Born: 12 November 1980 (age 45) Utrecht, Netherlands

Sport
- Sport: Water polo
Medal record
Representing the Netherlands
Olympic Games
Gold medal – first place	2008 Beijing	Team competition
European Championships
Bronze medal – third place	2010 Zagreb	Team competition

Simone Margareta Koot (born 12 November 1980) is a water polo player of the Netherlands who represents the Dutch national team in international competitions.

Koot was part of the team that became 6th at the 2003 World Aquatics Championships in Barcelona. At the 2006 Women's European Water Polo Championship in Belgrade they finished in fifth place, followed by the 9th spot at the 2007 World Aquatics Championships in Melbourne. The Dutch team finished in fifth place at the 2008 Women's European Water Polo Championship in Málaga and they qualified for the 2008 Summer Olympics in Beijing. There they ended up winning the gold medal on 21 August, beating the United States 9–8 in the final.

== See also ==
- Netherlands women's Olympic water polo team records and statistics
- List of Olympic champions in women's water polo
- List of Olympic medalists in water polo (women)
