= Monika Kruszona =

German water polo player (born 1985)

Kruszona, Monika
Personal information
- Nationality: German
- Born: August 4, 1985 (age 40) Krefeld, West Germany

Sport
- Sport: Swimming
- Club: SV Blau-Weiss Bochum

Monika Kruszona (born August 4, 1985 in Krefeld) is a German water polo player. She plays for SV Blau-Weiss Bochum in the Deutsche Wasserball-Liga, the highest water polo competition in Germany.

== Career ==
Monika Kruszona began playing for SV Blau-Weiss Bochum in 2003. With her club she won eight consecutive national championships (2003 to 2010) and also seven times the national cup competition (only in 2007 SV Bayer Uerdingen 08 one).

For the German national team she participated in the world youth championships 2001 in Perth and 2003 in Calgary. With 23 goals she was the best goalscorer during the Calgary tournament (together with her teammate Barbara Bujka) For the senior squad she played at the world championships 2003 in Barcelona, 2005 in Montréal and 2007 in Melbourne. Furthermore, she was a member of the German team that participated in the European championships 2001 in Budapest, 2003 in Ljubljana, 2006 in Belgrade and 2008 in Málaga.

== Web ==
- Profile for the 2007 World Championship (German)
