= Yasemin Smit =

Dutch water polo player (born 1984)

Personal information
- Born: 21 November 1984 (age 41) Amsterdam, Netherlands
- Height: 180 cm (5 ft 11 in)
- Weight: 71 kg (157 lb)
Medal record
Women's water polo
Representing the Netherlands
Olympic Games
Gold medal – first place	2008 Beijing	Team competition
World Championships
Silver medal – second place	2015 Kazan	Team competition
European Championships
Silver medal – second place	2014 Budapest	Team competition
Silver medal – second place	2016 Belgrade	Team competition
Bronze medal – third place	2010 Zagreb	Team competition
FINA World League
Bronze medal – third place	2015 Shanghai	Team competition

Miloushka Yasemin Smit (born 21 November 1984) is a water polo player of the Netherlands who represented the Dutch national team in international competitions.

Smit was part of the team that became 10th at the 2005 World Aquatics Championships in Montreal. At the 2006 FINA Women's Water Polo World League in Cosenza and the 2006 Women's European Water Polo Championship in Belgrade they finished in fifth place, followed by the 9th spot at the 2007 World Aquatics Championships in Melbourne. The Dutch team finished in fifth place at the 2008 Women's European Water Polo Championship in Málaga. In Kirishi they qualified for the 2008 Summer Olympics in Beijing. There they ended up winning the gold medal on 21 August, beating the United States 9–8 in the final.

She has played for the Greek giants Olympiacos, winning the Greek Championship in 2009. In 2017, she plays again for this team.

She was the captain of the Dutch team winning the 2008 Summer Olympics, the silver medal at the 2015 World Aquatics Championships, 2014 European Championship and 2016 European Championship and de bronze medal at the 2010 European Championship.

== See also ==
- Netherlands women's Olympic water polo team records and statistics
- List of Olympic champions in women's water polo
- List of Olympic medalists in water polo (women)
- List of World Aquatics Championships medalists in water polo
