= 2006 FINA Women's Water Polo World League =

- League: FINA Water Polo World League
- Sport: Water Polo

FINA Women's Water Polo World League seasons
- ← 2005 2007 →

The 2006 FINA Women's Water Polo World League was the third edition of the annual event, organised by the world's governing body in aquatics, the FINA. Four qualification tournaments were held, before the Super Final took off in Cosenza, Italy from July 26 to July 30, 2006.

== Preliminary round ==
=== GROUP A ===
- Held from July 3 to July 8, 2006 in Yongzhou, PR China

	Team	Points	G	W	D	L	GF	GA	Diff
1.	Australia	18	6	6	0	0	79	35	+44
2.	New Zealand	12	6	4	0	2	56	46	+10
3.	China	6	6	2	0	4	53	58	–5
4.	China II	0	6	0	0	6	30	79	–49

=== GROUP B ===
- Held from July 7 to July 9, 2006 in Quebec, Canada

	Team	Points	G	W	D	L	GF	GA	Diff
1.	Canada	6	2	2	0	0	25	17	+8
2.	United States	3	2	1	0	1	19	19	0
3.	Brazil	0	2	0	0	2	16	24	–8

=== GROUP C ===
- Held from June 30 to July 8, 2006 in Barcelona, Spain and Bochum, Germany

	Team	Points	G	W	D	L	GF	GA	Diff
1.	Spain	18	6	6	0	0	76	50	+26
2.	Germany	9	6	3	0	3	67	71	–4
3.	Netherlands	6	6	2	0	4	56	65	–9
4.	Greece	3	6	1	0	5	62	75	–13

=== GROUP D ===
- Held from June 30 to July 8, 2006 in Nancy, France and Siracusa, Italy

	Team	Points	G	W	D	L	GF	GA	Diff
1.	Russia	12	4	4	0	0	61	25	+36
2.	Italy	6	4	2	0	2	46	31	+15
3.	France	0	4	0	0	4	15	66	–51

== Semi finals ==
=== GROUP E ===
- Held from July 12 to July 16, 2006 in Los Alamitos, United States

	Team	Points	G	W	D	L	GF	GA	Diff
1.	United States	15	5	5	0	0	69	33	+36
2.	Canada	11	5	4	0	1	62	38	+26
3.	Australia	10	5	3	0	2	68	41	+23
4.	Brazil	6	5	2	0	3	30	59	–29
5.	New Zealand	3	5	1	0	4	43	67	–24
6.	China	0	5	0	0	5	28	62	–32

=== GROUP F ===
- Held from July 13 to July 17, 2006 in Kirishi, Russia

	Team	Points	G	W	D	L	GF	GA	Diff
1.	Italy	14	5	5	0	0	64	46	+18
2.	Russia	12	5	4	0	1	66	45	+21
3.	Netherlands	9	5	3	0	2	50	40	+10
4.	Spain	7	5	2	0	3	57	51	+6
5.	Germany	3	5	1	0	4	37	65	–28
6.	France	0	5	0	0	5	34	61	–27

- July 13, 2006

Italy	10 – 8	Netherlands
Spain	11 – 8	France
Germany	4 – 19	Russia

- July 14, 2006

France	6 – 13	Italy
Germany	7 – 14	Spain
Russia	12 – 10	Netherlands

- July 15, 2006

Netherlands	14 – 5	France
Italy	16 – 10	Germany
Spain	12 – 13	Russia

- July 16, 2006

Germany	5 – 9	Netherlands
Spain	9 – 9	Italy
Russia	12 – 8	France

- July 17, 2006

France	7 – 11	Germany
Netherlands	9 – 8	Spain
Italy	10 – 11	Russia

== Super Final ==
	Team	Points	G	W	D	L	GF	GA	Diff
1.	United States	12	5	4	0	1	48	40	+8
2.	Italy	10	5	3	0	2	46	43	+3
3.	Russia	9	5	3	0	2	56	50	+6
4.	Australia	9	5	3	0	2	63	63	0
5.	Canada	5	5	2	0	3	41	45	–4
6.	Netherlands	0	5	0	0	5	44	57	–13

- July 26, 2006

United States	14 – 7	Netherlands
Canada	8 – 12	Russia
Australia	14 – 13	Italy

- July 27, 2006

Canada	9 – 8	Netherlands
Australia	14 – 12	Russia
United States	8 – 6	Italy

- July 28, 2006

United States	7 – 10	Russia
Australia	12 – 11	Netherlands
Canada	3 – 6	Italy

- July 29, 2006

Australia	6 – 5	Canada
Russia	9 – 8	Netherlands
United States	??–??	Italy

=== Play-offs ===
- Sunday July 30, 2006

Canada	7 – 9	Netherlands
Australia	7 – 12	Russia
United States	9 – 6	Italy

== Final ranking ==
=== Final ranking ===
Rank	Team
Gold medal	United States
Silver medal	Italy
Bronze medal	Russia
4	Australia
5	Netherlands
6	Canada

2006 FINA Women's Water Polo World League

United States
Second title

== Individual awards ==
- Most Valuable Player
  - ???
- Best Goalkeeper
  - ???

RANK	TOPSCORERS	GOALS
1.	Blanca Gil (ESP)	40
2.	Tania di Mario (ITA)	36
3.	Ekaterina Pantyulina (RUS)	32
4.	Kate Gynther (AUS)	31
5.	Bronwyn Knox (AUS)	29
6.	Rebecca Rippon (AUS)	26
7.	Natalia Shepelina (RUS)	23
7.	Alena Vylegzhanina (RUS)	23
9.	Manuela Zanchi (ITA)	22
9.	Iefke van Belkum (NED)	22
9.	Rianne Guichelaar (NED)	22
12.	Silvia Bosurgi (ITA)	21
12.	Alette Sijbring (NED)	21
14.	Katrin Dierolf (GER)	20
14.	Monika Kruszona (GER)	20
14.	Cristina López (ESP)	20
14.	Angeliki Gerolimou (GRE)	20
14.	Sofia Konukh (RUS)	20

== Statistics ==
- Total goals: 1523
- Total matches: 77
- Goals per match: 19.8
- Total of scorers: 172
