= Iefke van Belkum =

Dutch water polo player (born 1986)

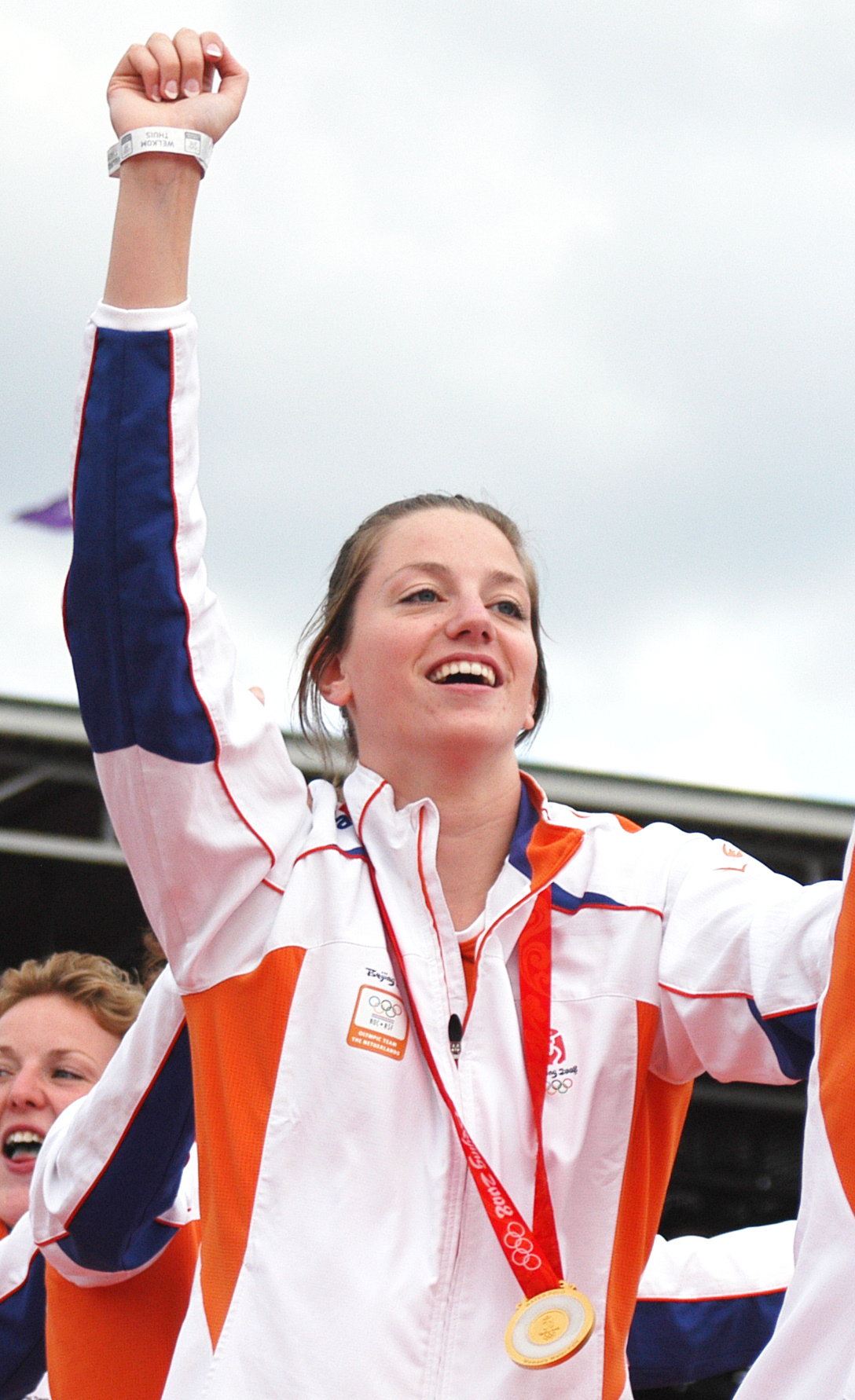
- Van Belkum in 2008

Personal information
- Born: 22 July 1986 (age 39) Leiden, Netherlands

Sport
- Sport: Water polo
Medal record
Representing the Netherlands
Olympic Games
Gold medal – first place	2008 Beijing	Team competition
European Championships
Bronze medal – third place	2010 Zagreb	Team competition

Iefke van Belkum (born 22 July 1986) is a Dutch water polo player who represents the Netherlands national team in international competitions.

Van Belkum was part of the team that became 10th at the 2005 World Aquatics Championships in Montreal. At the 2006 FINA Women's Water Polo World League in Cosenza and the 2006 Women's European Water Polo Championship in Belgrade they finished in fifth place, followed by the 9th spot at the 2007 World Aquatics Championships in Melbourne. The Dutch team finished in fifth place at the 2008 Women's European Water Polo Championship in Málaga and they qualified for the 2008 Summer Olympics in Beijing. There they ended up winning the gold medal on 21 August, beating the United States 9–8 in the final.

She has played for the Greek clubs Ethnikos Piraeus, where she won the LEN Trophy in 2010, and Olympiacos, where she won the Greek Championship in 2011, scoring five goals in the final game of the best-of-five final series.

== See also ==
- Netherlands women's Olympic water polo team records and statistics
- List of Olympic champions in women's water polo
- List of Olympic medalists in water polo (women)

Awards
Preceded by (Netherlands) Daniëlle de Bruijn	LEN European Water Polo Player of the Year; 2009	Succeeded by (Russia) Sofia Konukh
