= 2010 Women's European Water Polo Championship =

Tournament details
- Host country: Croatia
- Venue(s): 1 (in 1 host city)
- Dates: 31 August–10 September
- Teams: 8 (from 1 confederation)

Final positions
- Champions: Russia (3rd title)
- Runner-up: Greece
- Third place: Netherlands
- Fourth place: Italy

The 2010 Women's European Water Polo Championship was the 13th edition of the bi-annual event, organised by the Europe's governing body in aquatics, the Ligue Européenne de Natation. The event took place at the Arena Zagreb in Zagreb, Croatia from August 31 to September 10, 2010.

== Teams ==
Group A

- Russia
- Croatia
- Italy
- Greece

Group B

- Spain
- Hungary
- Netherlands
- Germany

== Preliminary round ==
Team advances to Semifinals
Team advances to Quarterfinals
Team competes in 7th–8th place match

=== Group A ===
	Team	Points	G	W	D	L	GF	GA	Diff
1.	Greece	7	3	2	1	0	43	16	+27
2.	Russia	5	3	1	2	0	47	22	+25
3.	Italy	4	3	1	1	1	39	22	+17
4.	Croatia	0	3	0	0	3	10	79	−69

31 August 2010; 18:00	Report	Croatia	3–28	Russia	Referees: Levin (ISR), Wengenroth (SUI)
31 August 2010; 18:00	Report	Score by quarters: 0–8, 0–4, 1–11, 2–5			Referees: Levin (ISR), Wengenroth (SUI)
31 August 2010; 18:00	Report	Sehic, Supraha, Kalauz 1	Goals	Konukh 7	Referees: Levin (ISR), Wengenroth (SUI)

31 August 2010; 19:30	Report	Greece	7–5	Italy	Referees: Ciric (SRB), Bender (GER)
31 August 2010; 19:30	Report	Score by quarters: 2–1, 0–3, 2–0, 3–1			Referees: Ciric (SRB), Bender (GER)
31 August 2010; 19:30	Report	Roumpesi, Gerolymou 2	Goals	Rocco 2	Referees: Ciric (SRB), Bender (GER)

2 September 2010; 16:30	Report	Greece	7–7	Russia	Referees: Borrell (ESP), Ciric (SRB)
2 September 2010; 16:30	Report	Score by quarters: 1–2, 3–4, 2–0, 1–1			Referees: Borrell (ESP), Ciric (SRB)
2 September 2010; 16:30	Report	Roumpesi, Gerolymou 3	Goals	Belyaeva 2	Referees: Borrell (ESP), Ciric (SRB)

2 September 2010; 18:00	Report	Croatia	3–22	Italy	Referees: Stajkovic (MKD), Hausche (GER)
2 September 2010; 18:00	Report	Score by quarters: 0–6, 1–5, 0–7, 2–4			Referees: Stajkovic (MKD), Hausche (GER)
2 September 2010; 18:00	Report	Miljkovic, Reic-Kranjac, Artukovich 1	Goals	Garibotti, Bianconi 4	Referees: Stajkovic (MKD), Hausche (GER)

4 September 2010; 18:00	Report	Croatia	4–29	Greece	Referees: Bervoets (NED), Stajkovic (MKD)
4 September 2010; 18:00	Report	Score by quarters: 2–7, 0–7, 1–7, 1–8			Referees: Bervoets (NED), Stajkovic (MKD)
4 September 2010; 18:00	Report	Stanicic 4	Goals	Liosi, Gerolymou 6	Referees: Bervoets (NED), Stajkovic (MKD)

4 September 2010; 19:30	Repert	Russia	12–12	Italy	Referees: Bender (GER), Juhasz (HUN)
4 September 2010; 19:30	Repert	Score by quarters: 1–5, 5–0, 2–1, 4–6			Referees: Bender (GER), Juhasz (HUN)
4 September 2010; 19:30	Repert	Ivanova 3	Goals	Emmolo 3	Referees: Bender (GER), Juhasz (HUN)

=== Group B ===
	Team	Points	G	W	D	L	GF	GA	Diff
1.	Netherlands	6	3	2	0	1	33	26	+7
2.	Spain	6	3	2	0	1	32	28	+4
3.	Hungary	4	3	1	1	1	29	31	−2
4.	Germany	1	3	0	1	2	30	39	−9

31 August 2010; 15:00	Report	Spain	12–10	Germany	Referees: Bonnay (FRA), Brguljan (MNE)
31 August 2010; 15:00	Report	Score by quarters: 3–2, 5–2, 3–4, 1–2			Referees: Bonnay (FRA), Brguljan (MNE)
31 August 2010; 15:00	Report	Gil 4	Goals	Blomenkamp 3	Referees: Bonnay (FRA), Brguljan (MNE)

31 August 2010; 16:30	Report	Netherlands	8–9	Hungary	Referees: Dreval (RUS), Buch (ESP)
31 August 2010; 16:30	Report	Score by quarters: 2–3, 0–1, 1–3, 5–2			Referees: Dreval (RUS), Buch (ESP)
31 August 2010; 16:30	Report	van Belkum, J. Cabout 2	Goals	Szűcs 4	Referees: Dreval (RUS), Buch (ESP)

2 September 2010; 15:00	Report	Netherlands	17–10	Germany	Referees: Stavropoulos (GRE), Dreval (RUS)
2 September 2010; 15:00	Report	Score by quarters: 5–1, 6–6, 2–2, 4–1			Referees: Stavropoulos (GRE), Dreval (RUS)
2 September 2010; 15:00	Report	Klein, Vermeer 4	Goals	Klein 3	Referees: Stavropoulos (GRE), Dreval (RUS)

2 September 2010; 19:30	Report	Spain	13–10	Hungary	Referees: Wengenroth (SUI), Simion (ROU)
2 September 2010; 19:30	Report	Score by quarters: 3–3, 3–2, 5–2, 2–3			Referees: Wengenroth (SUI), Simion (ROU)
2 September 2010; 19:30	Report	Tarragó 4	Goals	Kisteleki, Drávucz 3	Referees: Wengenroth (SUI), Simion (ROU)

4 September 2010; 15:00	Report	Germany	10–10	Hungary	Referees: Stravridis (GRE), Vlasic (CRO)
4 September 2010; 15:00	Report	Score by quarters: 4–3, 3–2, 1–1, 2–4			Referees: Stravridis (GRE), Vlasic (CRO)
4 September 2010; 15:00	Report	Bloemenkamp 3	Goals	Kisteleki 5	Referees: Stravridis (GRE), Vlasic (CRO)

4 September 2010; 16:30	Report	Spain	7–8	Netherlands	Referees: Simion (ROU), Riccitelli (ITA)
4 September 2010; 16:30	Report	Score by quarters: 2–4, 1–3, 1–0, 3–1			Referees: Simion (ROU), Riccitelli (ITA)
4 September 2010; 16:30	Report	Tarragó, García 2	Goals	M. Cabout 2	Referees: Simion (ROU), Riccitelli (ITA)

== Quarterfinals ==
6 September 2010; 17:30	Report	Russia	12–9	Hungary	Referees: Bonnay (FRA), Ciric (SRB)
6 September 2010; 17:30	Report	Score by quarters: 3–2, 4–3, 4–2, 1–2			Referees: Bonnay (FRA), Ciric (SRB)
6 September 2010; 17:30	Report	Ivanova 3	Goals	Dravucz 4	Referees: Bonnay (FRA), Ciric (SRB)

6 September 2010; 19:30	Report	Spain	9–10	Italy	Referees: Brguljan (MNE), Vlasic (CRO)
6 September 2010; 19:30	Report	Score by quarters: 2–3, 2–3, 4–3, 1–1			Referees: Brguljan (MNE), Vlasic (CRO)
6 September 2010; 19:30	Report	Gil 5	Goals	Bianconi, Cotti 3	Referees: Brguljan (MNE), Vlasic (CRO)

== Semifinals ==
8 September 2010; 17:30	Report	Italy	5–10	Greece	Referees: Kun (HUN), Simion (ROU)
8 September 2010; 17:30	Report	Score by quarters: 0–3, 2–4, 2–1, 1–2			Referees: Kun (HUN), Simion (ROU)
8 September 2010; 17:30	Report	Garibotti 2	Goals	Gerolymou 4	Referees: Kun (HUN), Simion (ROU)

8 September 2010; 19:30	Report	Russia	10–7	Netherlands	Referees: Franulovic (CRO), Wengenroth (SUI)
8 September 2010; 19:30	Report	Score by quarters: 3–1, 3–3, 2–1, 2–2			Referees: Franulovic (CRO), Wengenroth (SUI)
8 September 2010; 19:30	Report	Prokofyeva 3	Goals	van Belkum 3	Referees: Franulovic (CRO), Wengenroth (SUI)

== Finals ==
=== 7th place playoff ===
6 September 2010; 15:30	Report	Croatia	7–23	Germany	Referees: Wengenroth (SUI), Dreval(RUS)
6 September 2010; 15:30	Report	Score by quarters: 2–7, 1–6, 3–4, 1–6			Referees: Wengenroth (SUI), Dreval(RUS)
6 September 2010; 15:30	Report	Reic-Kranjac 3	Goals	Kruszona 5	Referees: Wengenroth (SUI), Dreval(RUS)

=== 5th place playoff ===
8 September 2010; 15:30	Report	Hungary	10–7	Spain	Referees: Bender (GER), Riccitelli (ITA)
8 September 2010; 15:30	Report	Score by quarters: 3–0, 2–4, 3–2, 2–1			Referees: Bender (GER), Riccitelli (ITA)
8 September 2010; 15:30	Report	Valkai 3	Goals	Meseguer 3	Referees: Bender (GER), Riccitelli (ITA)

=== Bronze medal match ===
All times are CEST (UTC+2).

10 September 2010; 17:30	Report	Italy	12–14	Netherlands	Zagreb, Croatia; Referees: Ursula Wengenroth (SUI), Gyorgy Juhasz (HUN)
10 September 2010; 17:30	Report	Score by quarters: 1–5, 4–3, 3–3, 4–3			Zagreb, Croatia; Referees: Ursula Wengenroth (SUI), Gyorgy Juhasz (HUN)
10 September 2010; 17:30	Report	Bianconi 3 Aiello, Cotti 2 Radicchi, Garibotti, Emmolo, Rocco, Frassinetti 1	Goals	van Belkum, J. Cabout 4 M. Cabout, Hakhverdian 2 Smit, Vermeer 1	Zagreb, Croatia; Referees: Ursula Wengenroth (SUI), Gyorgy Juhasz (HUN)

=== Gold medal match ===
All times are CEST (UTC+2).

10 September 2010; 20:00	Report	Greece	6–11	Russia	Zagreb, Croatia; Referees: Boris Margeta (SLO), Sergio Borrell (ESP)
10 September 2010; 20:00	Report	Score by quarters: 1–3, 3–3, 1–2, 1–3			Zagreb, Croatia; Referees: Boris Margeta (SLO), Sergio Borrell (ESP)
10 September 2010; 20:00	Report	Asimaki 4 Gerolymou 2	Goals	Glyzina, Konukh, Soboleva, Ivanova 2 Tankeeva, Antonova, Beliaeva 1	Zagreb, Croatia; Referees: Boris Margeta (SLO), Sergio Borrell (ESP)

== Final ranking ==
RANK	TEAM
	Russia
	Greece
	Netherlands
4.	Italy
5.	Hungary
6.	Spain
7.	Germany
8.	Croatia

2010 Women's European Water Polo champion

Russia
Third title

Team Roster

Evgeniya Protsenko, Nadezda Glyzina, Ekaterina Prokofyeva, Sofia Konukh, Evgenia Pustynnikova, Natalia Ryzhova-Alenicheva, Ekaterina Tankeeva, Evgenia Soboleva, Alexandra Antonova, Olga Belyaeva, Evgeniya Ivanova, Yulia Gaufler, Maria Kovtunovskaya.

== Individual awards ==
- Most Valuable Player
- Best Goalkeeper
- Topscorer
