= Greg McFadden =

Australian water polo player

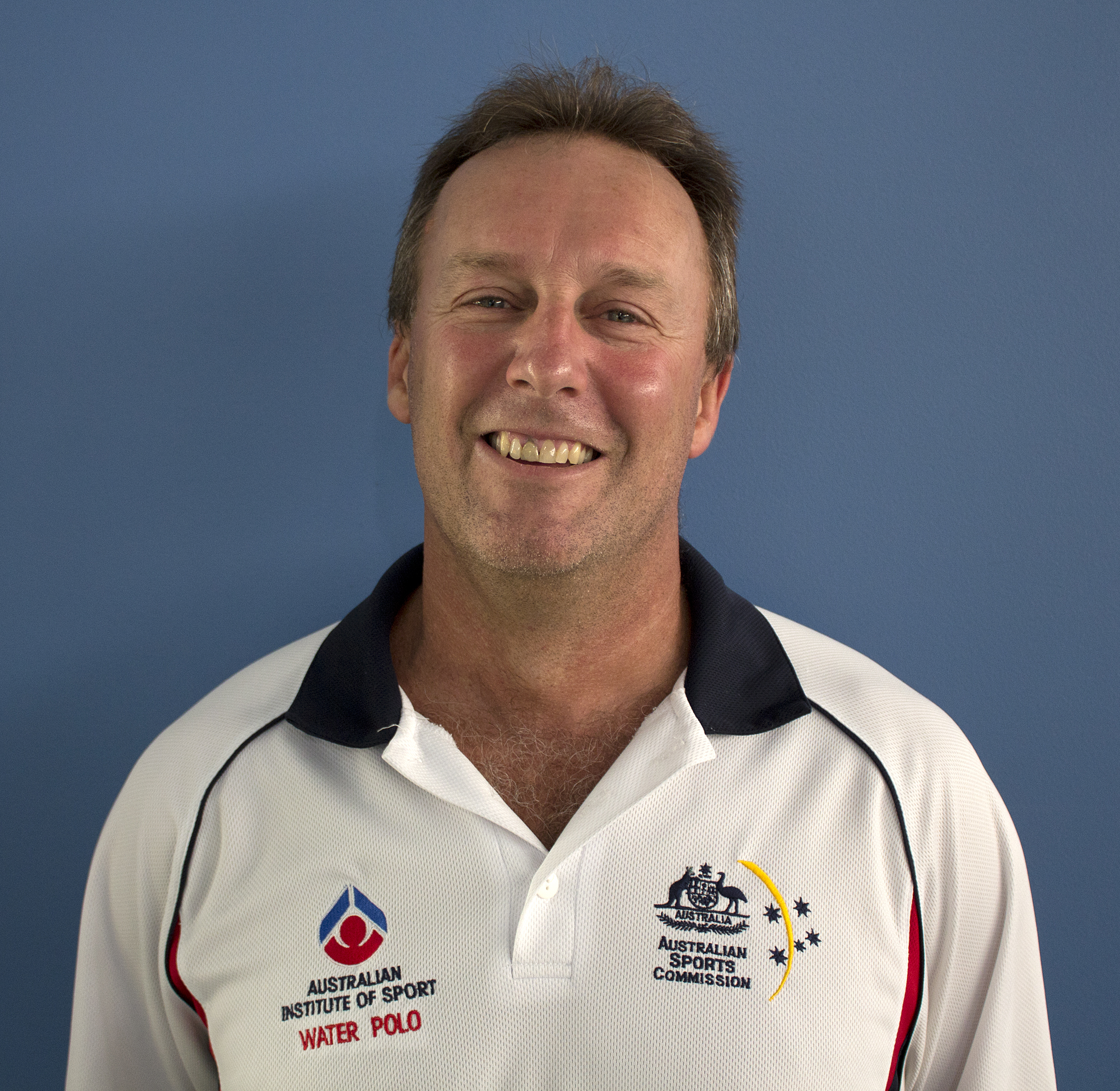
- McFadden in 2012

Personal information
- Full name: Gregory James McFadden
- Nickname: Dumper
- Born: 26 August 1964 (age 62) Sydney, Australia

Sport
- Sport: Water polo
- Event: Men's team
- Club: Cronulla Sharks Water Polo Club
- Now coaching: AIS water polo team (assistant coach); Australia women's national water polo team (head coach, 2005–2016)

Achievements and titles
- Olympic finals: 1992 (player); 2004 (assistant coach); 2008 (head coach); 2012 (head coach); 2016 (head coach)
Medal record
Coach for women's water polo
Australia
Olympic Games
Bronze medal – third place	2008 Beijing	Team competition
Bronze medal – third place	2012 London	Team competition
FINA World Championships
Silver medal – second place	2007 Melbourne	Team competition
Silver medal – second place	2013 Barcelona	Team competition
FINA World Cup
Gold medal – first place	2006 Tianjin	Team competition
Silver medal – second place	2010 Christchurch	Team competition
Silver medal – second place	2014Khanty-Mansiysk	Team competition

Gregory James McFadden (born 28 August 1964) is an Australian water polo coach and former player. He represented Australia as a member of the 1992 Summer Olympics Australia men's national water polo team. He was head coach of the Australia women's national water polo team from 2005 to 2016.

== Personal ==
McFadden was born on 28 August 1964 in Sydney. He is nicknamed Dumper.

== Player ==
McFadden played club water polo for the Cronulla Sutherland Water Polo Club. He later was a coach for the several different grades in the club.

McFadden had a water polo scholarship at the Australian Institute of Sport (AIS) for two years where he was coached by Charles Turner. He was a member of the Australia men's national water polo team and represented the country at the 1992 Summer Olympics. His team finished fifth.

== Coaching ==
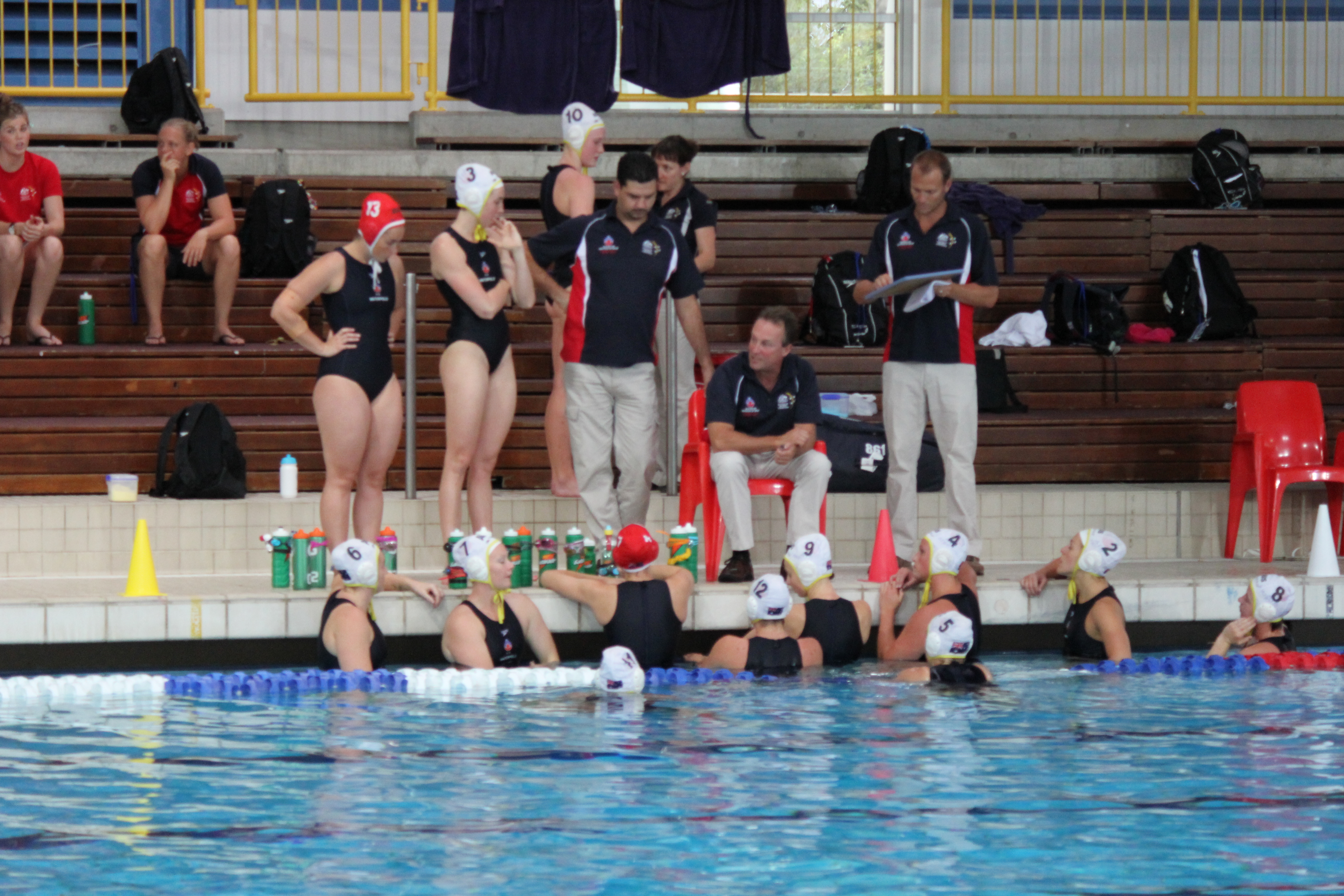
McFadden (sitting in chair) talking to players during the third of a five-game test series against the Great Britain women's national water polo team on 25 February 2012. Australia won 15–6.

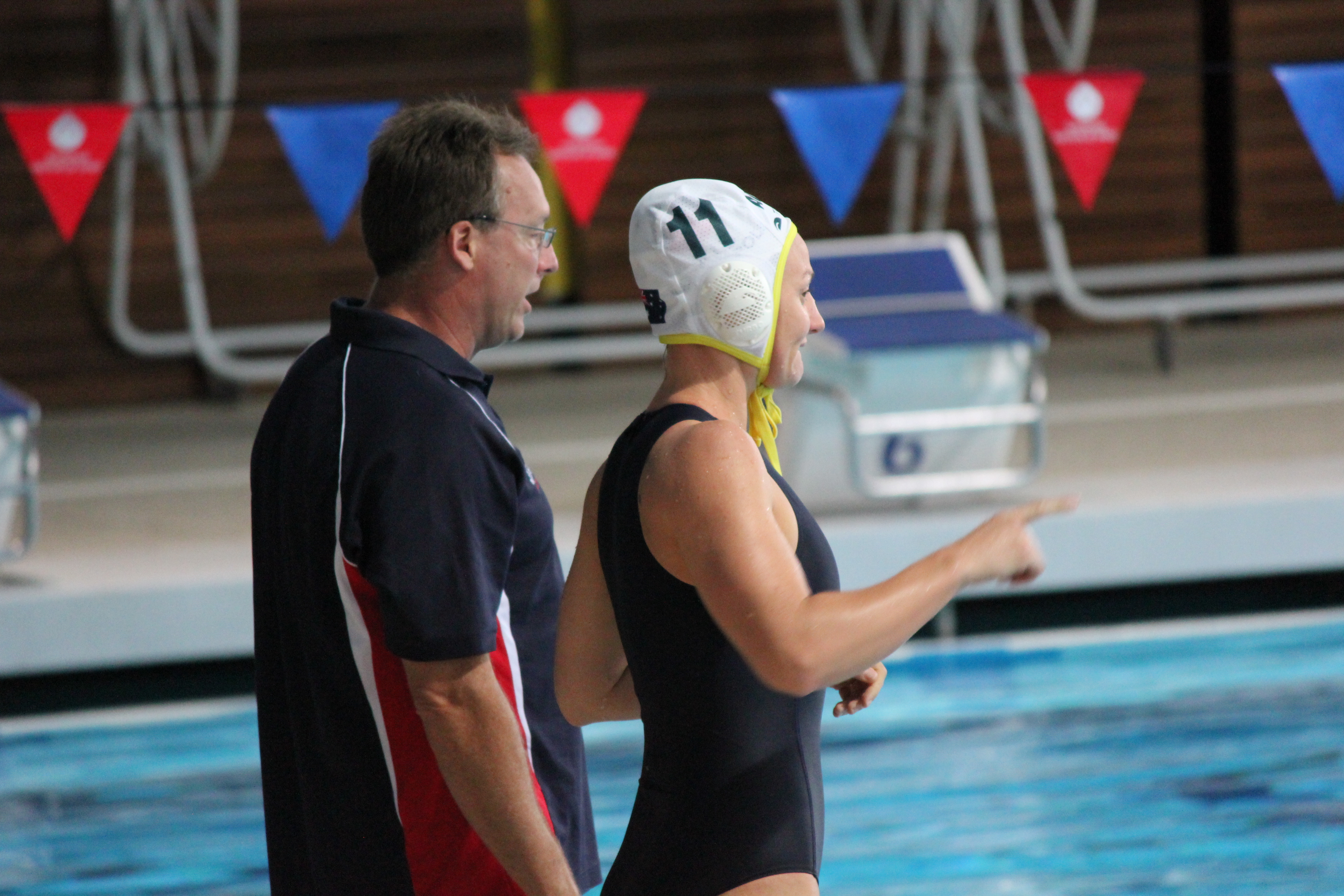
McFadden and Melissa Rippon during Australia's fifth test match against Great Britain.

McFadden has coached for the Australian Institute of Sport. After completing two years on scholarship at the AIS, he was appointed as a scholarship coach in 1990. He was an assistant coach to the AIS men's water polo team from 1992 to 1996. In 1996, he moved to Sydney to become the New South Wales Institute of Sport's Head Water Polo Coach, coaching both men's and women's squads. In 2001, McFadden moved back to Canberra to become AIS Men's Water Polo Head Coach. He held this position until 2004 when he was appointed assistant national women's coach. In 2005, he was appointed national women's coach taking over from Istvan Gorgenyi.

He was the head coach of the AIS's women's water polo team from 2005 to 2016.

McFadden was the head coach of the Australia women's national water polo team from 2005 to 2016. As head coach, he has helped make Australia one of the top three ranked teams in the world. He helped guide the 2006 national team to a first-place finish at the FINA World Cup. He helped the 2007 squad secure a silver medal finish at the World Championships in Melbourne. He impressed Steve Waugh with his requirements that national team players eat dinner at the table and eat everything on their plate.

On 13 August 2008, after his team drew 7–7 in a match against Hungary, he had a melt down at the media conference regarding the match officiating that saw Melissa Rippon removed from the game when Australia was ahead by a goal only for Hungary to tie things up by a goal in the remaining 16 seconds. McFadden called the referee an arsehole and went on to say: "How's that a kick-out [exclusion] at the end of the game? We're up by a goal, we don't want to give away an exclusion, we foul the girl, we're trying to cut back. The Hungarian player has hold of us and we get excluded. That's just total bullshit as far as I'm concerned. I'd like to kill the bastard."

He was the coach when Australia's women won a bronze medal at the 2008 Summer Olympics. In 2012, he coached the team that competed at the Pan Pacific tournament. He coached the team to an 8–7 win over the United States at the tournament. At the 2012 Summer Olympics he coached the team to the bronze medal.

=== Major competitions ===
Results of the Australian women's team coached by McFadden at major competitions:

==== Olympic Games ====
- 2008 — 3rd place
- 2012 — 3rd place
- 2016 — 6th place

==== FINA World Championship ====
- 2005 — 6th place
- 2007 — 2nd place
- 2009 — 6th place
- 2011 — 5th place
- 2013 — 2nd place
- 2015 — 4th place

==== FINA World League ====
- 2005 — 3rd place
- 2006 — 4th place
- 2007 — 2nd place
- 2008 — 3rd place
- 2009 — 3rd place
- 2010 — 2nd place
- 2011 — 3rd place
- 2012 — 2nd place
- 2014 — 3rd place
- 2015 — 2nd place
- 2016 — 3rd place

==== FINA World Cup ====
- 2006 — 1st place
- 2010 — 2nd place
- 2014 — 2nd place

== See also ==
- Australia women's Olympic water polo team records and statistics
