= 2006 FINA Women's Water Polo World Cup =

- Website: FINA event site

The 2006 FINA Women's Water Polo World Cup was the fourteenth edition of the event, organised by the world's governing body in aquatics, the International Swimming Federation (FINA). The event took place in Tianjin, PR China from August 8 to August 13, 2006. Participating teams were the eight best teams from the last World Championships in Montreal, Quebec, Canada (2005). The top-five qualified for the 2007 World Aquatics Championships in Melbourne, Australia.

== Teams ==
GROUP A

- China
- Greece
- Russia
- United States

GROUP B

- Australia
- Canada
- Hungary
- Italy

== Squads ==
=== Australia ===
- Gemma Beadsworth
- Nicole Dyson
- Suzie Fraser
- Taniele Gofers
- Kate Gynther
- Fiona Hammond
- Bronwen Knox
- Emma Knox
- Alicia McCormack
- Patrice O'Neill
- Melissa Rippon
- Rebecca Rippon
- Mia Santoromito

Head coach:

- Greg McFadden

=== China ===
- Gao Ao
- He Jin
- Li Shuwei
- Liu Ping
- Ma Huanhuan
- Mo Fengmin
- Qiao Leiying
- Sun Huizi
- Sun Yating
- Sun Yujun
- Wang Yi
- Yang Jun
- Xu Zheng

Head coach:

- Pan Shengwa

=== Greece ===
- Alexandra Asimaki
- Alkisti Avramidou
- Christina Dimitrokali
- Angeliki Gerolymou
- Sofia Iosifidou
- Kelina Kantzou
- Konstantina Kouteli
- Stavroula Kozompoli
- Georgia Lara
- Vasileia Mavrelou
- Triantafyllia Manolioudaki
- Stella Mitsani
- Maria Tsouri

Head coach:

- Kyriakos Iosifidis

=== Hungary ===
- Timea Benkő
- Fruzsina Brávik
- Barbara Bujka
- Rita Drávucz
- Patricia Horváth
- Anikó Pelle
- Ágnes Primász
- Mercédesz Stieber
- Orsolya Takacs
- Eszter Tomaskovics
- Andrea Tóth
- Ágnes Valkai
- Krisztina Zantleitner

Head coach:

- Péter Szilágyi

=== Italy ===
- Silvia Bosurgi
- Teresa Frassinetti
- Eleonora Gay
- Elena Gigli
- Tania di Mario
- Martina Miceli
- Maddelena Musumeci
- Francesca Pavan
- Cinzia Ragusa
- Federica Rocco
- Daria Starace
- Erzsébet Valkai
- Manuela Zanchi

Head coach:

- Mauro Maugeri

=== Russia ===
- Olga Fomicheva
- Yulia Gaufler
- Nadezda Glyzina
- Sofia Konukh
- Marina Mazepova
- Ekaterina Pantyulina
- Evgeniya Protsenko
- Natalia Ryzhova-Alenicheva
- Natalya Shepelina
- Elena Smurova
- Evgenia Soboleva
- Alena Vylegzhanina
- Anastasia Zubkova

Head coach:

- Alexander Kleymenov

=== United States ===
- Elizabeth Armstrong
- Patricia Cardenas
- Kameryn Craig
- Emily Feher
- Erika Figge
- Natalie Golda
- Alison Gregorka
- Ericka Lorenz
- Moriah van Norman
- Heather Petri
- Brenda Villa
- Lauren Wenger
- Elsie Windes

Head coach:

- Guy Baker

== Preliminary round ==
=== GROUP A ===
	Team	Points	G	W	D	L	GF	GA	Diff
1.	United States	6	3	3	0	0	42	24	+18
2.	Russia	4	3	2	0	1	42	26	+16
3.	Greece	2	3	1	0	2	25	38	–13
4.	China	0	3	0	0	3	21	42	–21

- August 8, 2006

United States	11 – 10	Russia
China	7 – 10	Greece

- August 9, 2006

United States	17 – 7	Greece
China	7 – 18	Russia

- August 10, 2006

Russia	14 – 8	Greece
United States	14 – 7	China

=== GROUP B ===
	Team	Points	G	W	D	L	GF	GA	Diff
1.	Australia	6	3	3	0	0	28	19	+9
2.	Italy	4	3	2	0	1	24	23	+1
3.	Hungary	2	3	1	0	2	23	26	–3
4.	Canada	0	3	0	0	3	26	33	–7

- August 8, 2006

Hungary	7 – 8	Italy
Australia	12 – 8	Canada

- August 9, 2006

Hungary	10 – 9	Canada
Australia	7 – 5	Italy

- August 10, 2006

Italy	11 – 9	Canada
Hungary	6 – 9	Australia

== Quarterfinals ==
- August 11, 2006

Greece	7 – 11	Italy
Russia	7 – 5	Hungary

== Semifinals ==
- August 12, 2006

United States	7 [4] – 7 [5]	Italy
Australia	10 – 9	Russia

== Finals ==
- August 11, 2006 — Seventh place

China	7 – 11	Canada

- August 12, 2006 — Fifth place

Greece	7 – 16	Hungary

- August 13, 2006 — Bronze Medal

United States	8 – 9	Russia

- August 13, 2006 — Gold Medal

Australia	10 – 7	Italy

== Final ranking ==
RANK	TEAM
	Australia
	Italy
	Russia
4.	United States
5.	Hungary
6.	Greece
7.	Canada
8.	China

2006 Women's FINA World Cup winners

Australia
Third title

The top-five qualified for the 2007 World Water Polo Championship in Melbourne, Australia.

== Individual awards ==
Most Valuable Player

- ???

Best Goalkeeper

- ???

Top Scorer Tania di Mario
