= Jane Moran =

Australian water polo player

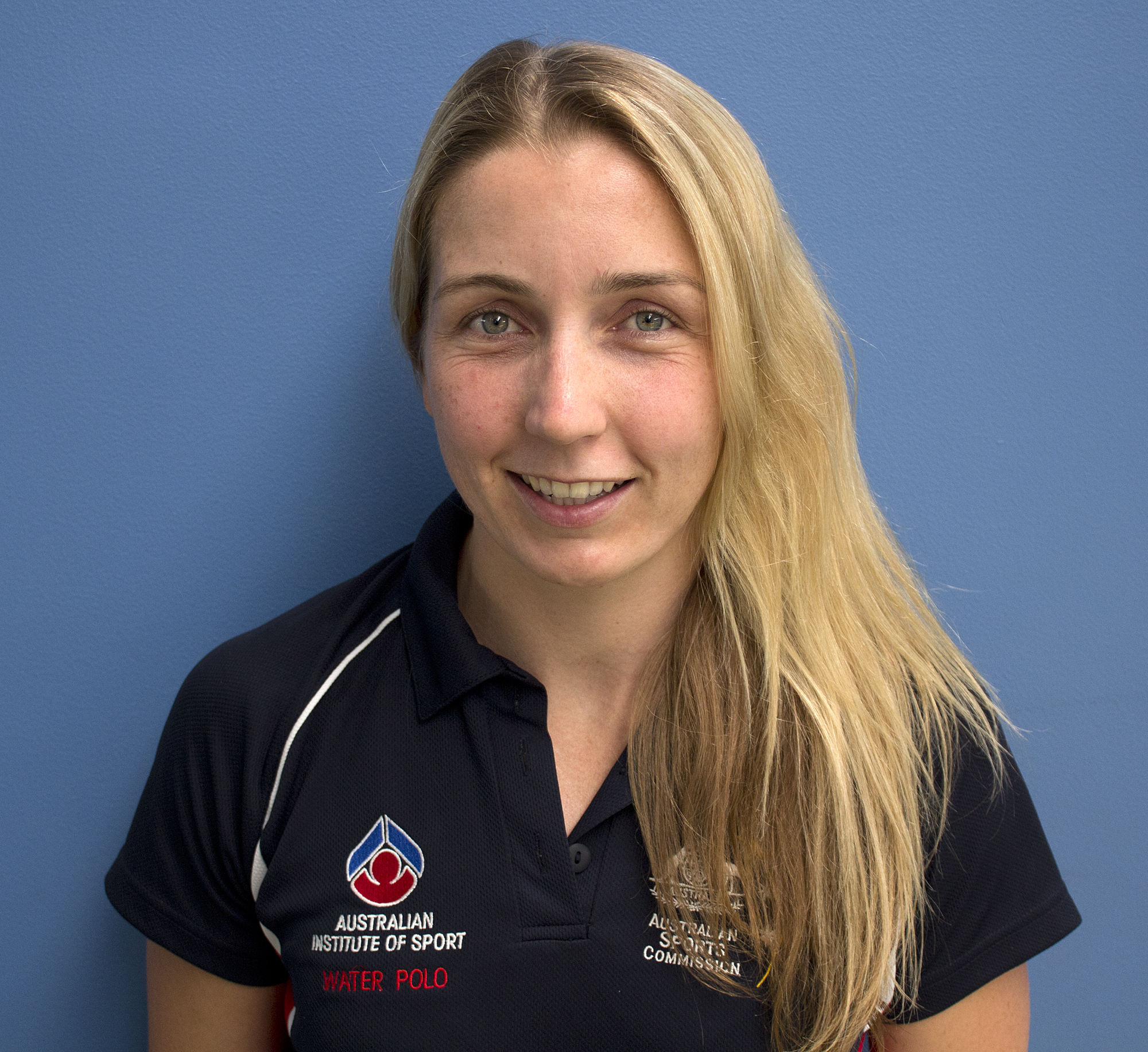

Personal information
- Born: 6 June 1985 (age 41) New South Wales
- Height: 167 cm (5 ft 6 in) (2012)
- Weight: 70 kg (154 lb) (2012)

Sport
- Country: Australia
- Sport: Water polo
Medal record
Women's water polo
Representing Australia
Olympic Games
Bronze medal – third place	2012 London	Team competition
Canada Cup
Gold medal – first place	2011 Canada Cup	Team competition
FINA World Cup
Silver medal – second place	2010 Christchurch	Team competition

Jane Moran (born 6 June 1985) is an Australian former water polo player. She won a gold medal at the 2011 Canada Cup and a silver medal at the 2010 FINA World Cup. She was part of the Australian junior national team that competed at the 2005 World Junior Championships held in Perth, Western Australia. She received her first call up to Australia's senior team in order to compete at the 2005 World Championships held in Canada. She was chosen to represent Australia at the 2012 Summer Olympics, and was a member of Australia's national team that won the bronze medal.

== Personal life ==
Moran was born in 1985 in Murwillumbah, New South Wales, but grew up in Ashgrove, Queensland (a suburb of Brisbane). In 2005, she was living in Brisbane, Queensland. In 2007, her father died right before she was supposed to leave to attend the national team's training camp for the 2008 Summer Olympics. She is an alumna of the University of Queensland, and received her bachelor's degree in civil engineering there from 2003 to 2006.

== Water polo ==
=== Club team ===
Moran is introduced along with other players on the national team before the first game in the Australia versus Great Britain test.

Moran played club water polo for the Brisbane Barracudas who compete in the National Water Polo League. She was with the team for the 2008, 2011 and 2012 seasons. During the 2009 and 2010 club seasons, she took time off to focus on preparing for the Olympics, and on her job as a civil engineer for Aurecon. In February 2012, she played her 200th game in the league, becoming her team's first female player and the league's second female player to reach this milestone when she played against the University of Western Australia (UWA) Torpedoes at home.

=== Junior national team ===
Moran was a member of Australia's junior national team. In 2002, she was a member of the national youth girls team that toured the United States in June and competed in an international series in Sydney in August. In 2004, she was a member of the team that toured Europe in July and August. She was part of the Australian junior national team that competed at the 2005 World Junior Championships held in Perth, Western Australia. The team beat Greece 10–4 for the bronze medal game. The team's only loss in the tournament was a 4–5 loss to the United States. She received her first call up to Australia's senior team in order to compete at the 2005 World Championships held in Canada.

=== Senior national team ===
Moran is a member of the Australian national team. She was invited to participate in a 2007 training camp for players who might be selected for the 2008 Summer Olympics. She was considered for that team but did not make it. In May 2010, she was a member of the team that competed at the FINA World League Asia-Oceania zone held in Osaka, Japan, and Tianjin, China. In 2010, she was a member of the Stingers squad that competed at the FINA World Cup in Christchurch, New Zealand. At the 2011 Canada Cup, she scored a goal in the first period in the gold medal match against China that the Australian team ended up winning. She competed in a warm-up match for the 2011 FINA World League against Italy in Ostia, Italy, in July that Australia won 12–11. In 2011, she was one of five Queensland women to compete for the Australian Stingers in the FINA World League competition held in Auckland, New Zealand. In July 2011, she was a member of the Australian Stingers that competed in the 2011 FINA World Championships in Shanghai as a field player. In preparation for this tournament, she attended a team training camp in Perth, Western Australia. She competed in the Pan Pacific Championships in January 2012 for the Australian Barbarians. She was part of the Stingers squad that competed in a five-game test against Great Britain at the AIS in late February 2012, the matches were the team's first matches against Great Britain's national team in six years. She won a bronze medal as part of the Australian team for the 2012 Summer Olympics.

Moran announced her retirement from international competition in 2014. Since her retirement from international competition, Moran continued to work as a civil engineer for Aurecon. In 2020 she was playing for the Hunter Hurricans in the Australian Waterpolo League.

== See also ==
- List of Olympic medalists in water polo (women)
