= Water polo at the 2007 World Aquatics Championships – Women's tournament =

The women's water polo tournament at the 2007 World Aquatics Championships, organised by the FINA, was held in Melbourne, Australia from 19 March to 1 April 2007.

The women's tournament was won by the United States, who beat Australia 6–5 in the final game.

== Preliminary round ==
=== Group A ===
Team	Pld	W	D	L	GF	GA	GDIF	Points
(Russia) Russian Federation	3	3	0	0	46	26	20	6
Spain	3	2	0	1	37	25	12	4
Germany	3	1	0	2	28	37	−9	2
People's Republic of China	3	0	0	3	19	42	−23	0

19 March 2007
China	–	Spain	7–15 (3–6, 1–5, 3–2, 0–2)
Russia	–	Germany	18–11 (4–0, 7–3, 2–3, 5–5)
21 March 2007
China	–	Russia	8–16 (1–1, 1–6, 5–5, 1–4)
Germany	–	Spain	6–15 (3–4, 1–5, 1–5, 1–1)
23 March 2007
China	–	Germany	4–11 (0–4, 0–2, 0–2, 4–3)
Russia	–	Spain	12–7 (2–1, 4–1, 2–1, 4–4)

=== Group B ===
Team	Pld	W	D	L	GF	GA	GDIF	Points
Australia	3	3	0	0	42	8	34	6
Canada	3	2	0	1	23	12	11	4
Brazil	3	1	0	2	19	19	0	2
Puerto Rico	3	0	0	3	7	52	−45	0

19 March 2007
Brazil	–	Puerto Rico	13–2 (3–1, 2–1, 3–0, 5–0)
Canada	–	Australia	4–5 (1–0, 1–2, 2–2, 0–1)
21 March 2007
Canada	–	Brazil	6–3 (2–0, 1–1, 1–1, 2–1)
Puerto Rico	–	Australia	1–26 (0–6, 1–5, 0–7, 0–8)
23 March 2007
Canada	–	Puerto Rico	13–4 (3–0, 2–1, 5–2, 3–1)
Brazil	–	Australia	3–11 (2–6, 0–1, 1–2, 1–2)

=== Group C ===
Team	Pld	W	D	L	GF	GA	GDIF	Points
United States of America	3	3	0	0	30	18	12	6
Greece	3	2	0	1	31	19	12	4
Netherlands	3	1	0	2	27	30	−3	2
Kazakhstan	3	0	0	3	17	38	−21	0

19 March 2007
Greece	–	Kazakhstan	11–5 (3–1, 3–1, 4–2, 1–1)
Netherlands	–	USA	7–9 (1–1, 2–2, 2–4, 2–2)
21 March 2007
USA	–	Kazakhstan	13–5 (2–2, 2–1, 5–1, 4–1)
Greece	–	Netherlands	14–7 (3–2, 3–0, 5–2, 3–3)
23 March 2007
Greece	–	USA	6–8 (3–2, 1–3, 0–2, 2–1)
Netherlands	–	Kazakhstan	14–7 (5–2, 3–2, 6–1, 0–2)

=== Group D ===
Team	Pld	W	D	L	GF	GA	GDIF	Points
Hungary	3	2	1	0	44	19	25	5
Italy	3	2	1	0	46	22	24	5
New Zealand	3	0	1	2	23	45	−22	1
Cuba	3	0	1	2	16	43	−27	1

19 March 2007
Cuba	–	New Zealand	7–7 (3–3, 0–1, 2–1, 2–2)
Italy	–	Hungary	8–8 (3–2, 2–3, 3–2, 0–1)
21 March 2007
Hungary	–	New Zealand	17–7 (2–1, 5–0, 4–4, 6–2)
Cuba	–	Italy	5–17 (1–5, 1–5, 1–3, 2–4)
23 March 2007
Cuba	–	Hungary	4–19 (1–3, 1–4, 1–3, 1–9)
Italy	–	New Zealand	21–9 (3–3, 8–2, 4–1, 6–3)

== Final round ==
=== Finals ===
Play-off; 25 March 2007
Greece	9
New Zealand	5
Netherlands	6
Italy	7
Spain	13
Brazil	9
Germany	10
Canada	14

Quarterfinals; 27 March 2007
(Russia) Russian Fed.	10
Greece	9
Australia	12
Italy	8
(United States) USA	10
Spain	6
Hungary	11
Canada	9

Semifinals; 29 March 2007
(Russia) Russian Fed.	9
Australia	12
(United States) USA	10
Hungary	9

Final; 31 March 200
Australia	5
(United States) USA	6
Third place
(Russia) Russian Fed.	9
Hungary	8

=== 5th–8th place ===
5th–8th place
29 March 2007 – 11:40 AEST
Greece	9
Italy	10
29 March 2007 – 16:00 AEST
Spain	6
Canada	9

5th/6th place
31 March 2007 – 10:20 AEST
Italy	7
Canada	3
7th/8th place
31 March 2007 – 09:00 AEST
Greece	9
Spain	11

=== 9th–12th place ===
9th–12th place
27 March 2007 – 11:40 AEST
Brazil	14
New Zealand	7
27 March 2007 – 13:00 AEST
Germany	6
Netherlands	8

9th/10th place
29 March 2007 – 10:20 AEST
Brazil	2
Netherlands	11
11th/12th place
29 March 2007 – 09:00 AEST
New Zealand	9
Germany	11

=== 13th–16th place ===
13th–16th place
25 March 2007 – 09:00 AEST
People's Republic of China	12
Puerto Rico	4
25 March 2007 – 10:20 AEST
Kazakhstan	10
Cuba	7

13th/14th place
27 March 2007 – 10:20 AEST
People's Republic of China	9
Kazakhstan	12
15th/16th place
27 March 2007 – 09:00 AEST
Puerto Rico	9
Cuba	11

== Medallists ==
Gold	Silver	Bronze
United States Elizabeth Armstrong; Patricia Cardenas; Kameryn Craig; Natalie Golda; Alison Gregorka; Brittany Hayes; Jaime Hipp; Ericka Lorenz; Heather Petri; Moriah van Norman; Brenda Villa; Lauren Wenger; Elsie Windes Head coach Guy Baker	Australia Gemma Beadsworth; Nikita Cuffe; Suzie Fraser; Taniele Gofers; Kate Gynther; Gemma Hadley; Amy Hetzel; Bronwen Knox; Emma Knox; Alicia McCormack; Melissa Rippon; Rebecca Rippon; Mia Santoromito Head coach Greg McFadden	Russia Valentina Vorontsova; Natalya Shepelina; Ekaterina Zubacheva; Sofya Konukh; Alena Vylegzhanina; Nadezda Glyzina; Ekaterina Pantyulina; Evgenia Soboleva; Natalya Ryzhova-Alenicheva; Olga Fomicheva; Elena Smurova; Anastasia Zubkova; Maria Kovtunovskaya Head coach Alexander Kleymenov

== Individual awards ==
- Most Valuable Player

- Lauren Wenger (USA)

- Best Goalkeeper

- Elizabeth Armstrong (USA)

- Top Scorer

- Blanca Gil (ESP) — 20 goals
