= Bronwen Knox =

Australian water polo player

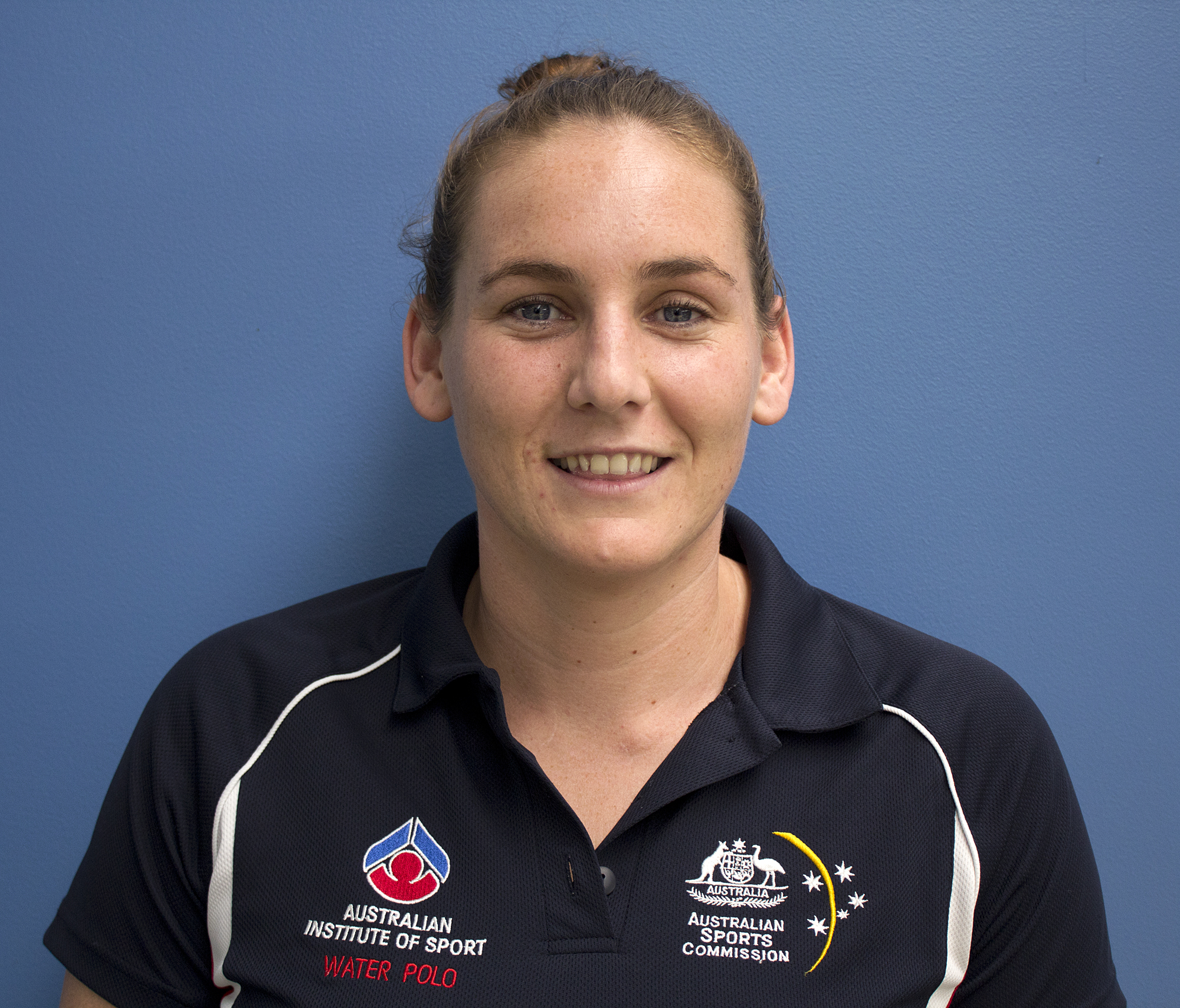

Personal information
- Nicknames: Bron, Bronnie
- Nationality: Australian
- Born: 16 April 1986 (age 40) Brisbane, Queensland
- Height: 182 cm (6 ft 0 in)
- Weight: 88 kg (194 lb)

Sport
- Country: Australia
- Sport: Water polo
- College team: Hartwick College
Medal record
Olympic Games
Bronze medal – third place	2008 Beijing	Team competition
Bronze medal – third place	2012 London	Team competition
World Aquatics Championship
Silver medal – second place	2007 Melbourne	Team competition
Silver medal – second place	2013 Barcelona	Team competition
Bronze medal – third place	2019 Gwangju	Team competition
FINA World Cup
Gold medal – first place	2006 Tianjin	Team competition
Silver medal – second place	2010 Christchurch	Team competition
FINA World League Super Finals
Silver medal – second place	2010 La Jolla	Team competition
Bronze medal – third place	2008 Tenerife	Team competition

Bronwen Knox (born 16 April 1986) is an Australian former water polo centre back/centre forward. She played for the National Water Polo League's Queensland Breakers before switching to the Victorian Tigers for the 2012 season. In 2013–14 season, she played for the Greek powerhouse Olympiacos in the European competitions, winning the LEN Trophy.

Knox has represented Australia as a member of Australia women's national water polo team at both the junior and senior levels. She won a gold medal at the 2006 FINA World Cup, the silver medal at the 2007 World Championship, the 2010 FINA World Cup and the 2010 FINA World League, and the bronze medal at the 2008 Summer Olympics and the 2008 FINA World League. She was a member of the Australia women's Olympic team that won a bronze medal in the 2012 Summer Olympics in London. She represented Australia at four Olympic Games the last one being the 2020 Summer Olympics. She was Australia's Deputy Chef de Mission at the 2024 Paris Olympics.

== Personal life ==
Knox was born on 16 April 1986 in Brisbane, Queensland. Her grandfather was William Knox, a prominent Queensland politician. Her parents are Andrew and Helen, and she has four siblings named Kirsty, Tom, Hamish and Meredith. Her parents and siblings were in Beijing to watch her win a bronze medal at the 2008 Summer Olympics. She is 182 cm (6 ft 0 in) tall, weighs 85 kilograms (13 st 5 lb), is right-handed and has a tattoo featuring the Olympic rings. She lives in Brisbane, Queensland, and has resided in Windsor, Queensland.

Knox attended Hartwick College in New York on a water polo scholarship, and Griffith University, where she earned a Bachelor of Biomedical Science. As of 2012, she worked as a laboratory assistant.

== Water polo ==
Knox plays centre back/centre forward and prefers to wear cap number six. She started playing water polo as a fourteen-year-old for a local Brisbane side. She has served as a member of the Australian Water Polo Athlete's Commission.

=== Club team ===
Knox played club water polo for the Queensland Breakers in the Australian National Water Polo League. She was with the team in 2007, 2008 and 2009. The annual match between the KFC Breakers and the Barracudas is considered by The Courier-Mail as a grudge match. She participated in the 2008 game with her team. In 2010, they played in the finals tournament, and she was named to the league finals' All Star team. As of 2012, she plays for the Victorian Tigers in the same league.

In the 2013–14 season, Knox played for the Greek powerhouse Olympiacos in the European competitions, winning the LEN Trophy. Knox was the hero of the final against Firenze (10–9), scoring Olympiacos' winning goal with a spectacular shot with only 23 seconds to go.

=== Junior national team ===
Knox has represented Australia at the junior national level. In 2002, she was a member of the national youth girls team that toured the United States in June, and competed in an international series in Sydney in August. In 2004, she was a member of the team that toured Europe in July and August. She was a member of Australia's junior national team in 2005, and she was on the junior side that competed in the VI FINA World Junior Championships in Perth in January of that year. The team defeated Greece 10–4 for the bronze medal, with its only loss a 4–5 loss to the United States.

=== Senior national team ===
Knox is a member of the Australia women's national water polo team, nicknamed the Stingers. She received her first call up to Australia's senior team to compete at the 2005 World Championships in Canada, where she scored her first international goal in her first game, which was against Germany. In 2006, she was part of the gold medal-winning side at the FINA World Cup in Tianjin, China, and the silver medal-winning team at the World Championships in Melbourne in 2007.

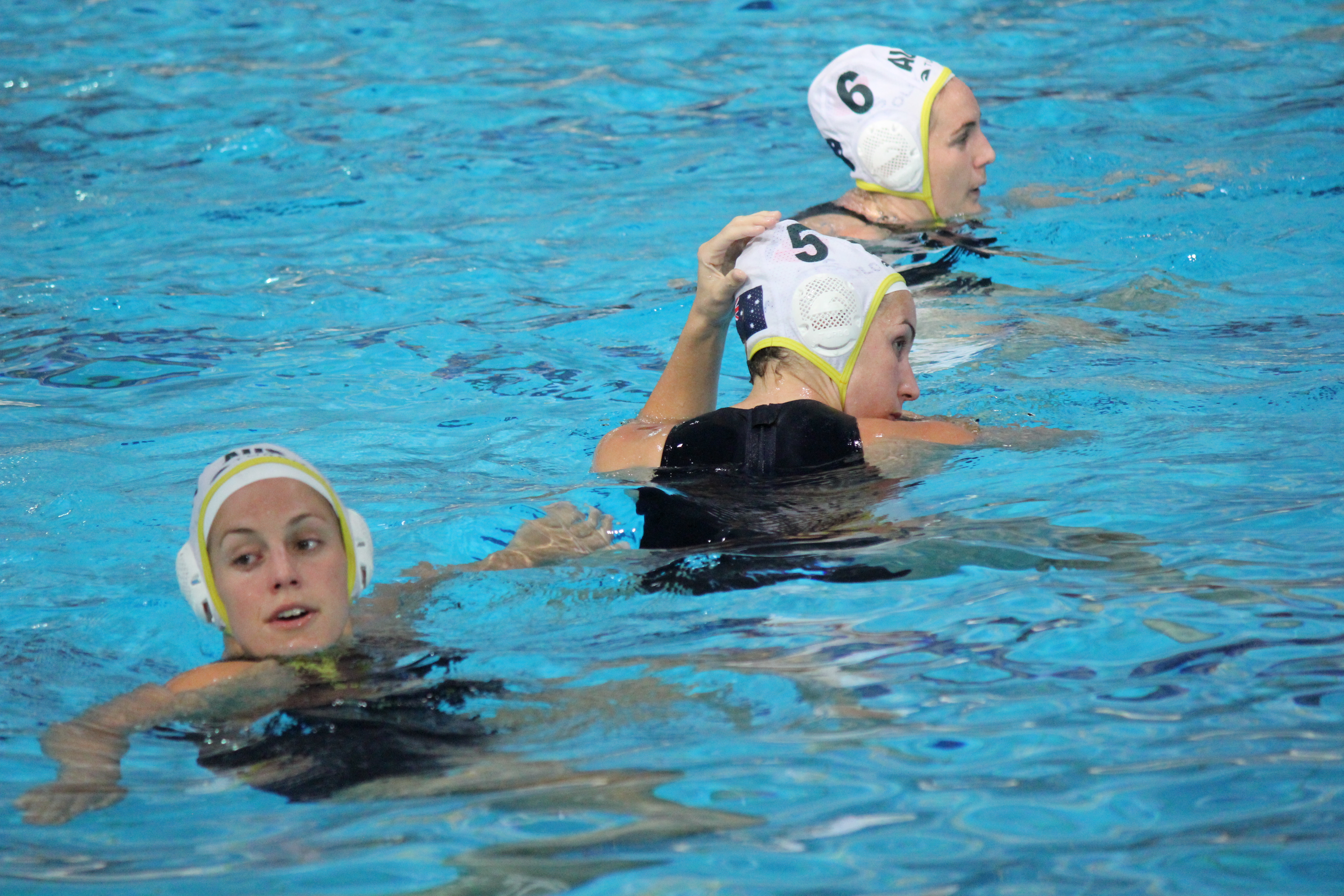
Knox (bottom left) in the third of a five-game test series against the British women's team on 25 February 2012. Australia won 15–6

Knox was part of Australia's Oceania Olympic qualification campaign in 2008. In an 18–1 victory over New Zealand during the qualifiers, she scored three goals. In 2008, Knox was named to the team that competed at the FINA world league preliminary round in Tianjin, China, and competed in the Women's International Series. In a 2008 Asia-Oceania qualifier against China for the World League Super Finals, she played in the 11–9 win that went to a penalty shoot out, scoring three of the goals for Australia. The World League Finals were held in Spain, and Australia ultimately took home a bronze medal.

Knox was the captain of the team that won a bronze medal at the 2008 Summer Olympics in Beijing. Her team ended up in the bronze medal match after losing 8–9 to the United States in the semi-finals and playing against Hungary for the bronze. Earlier in the Olympics, her team had tied with the Hungarians.

In 2009, Knox was a member of a team that competed at the FINA World Championships. She played in the semi-finals game against New Zealand that Australia won 14–4, scoring four goals. Knox was the captain of the national team in December 2010 and May 2011. In February 2010, she attended a national team training camp in the Gold Coast in preparation for the team's appearance at the April Commonwealth Championships. In May 2010, she was a member of the team that competed at the FINA World League Asia-Oceania zone held in Osaka, Japan, and Tianjin, China. She went on to compete in the FINA World League Finals in La Jolla, California, and Australia took home a silver medal.

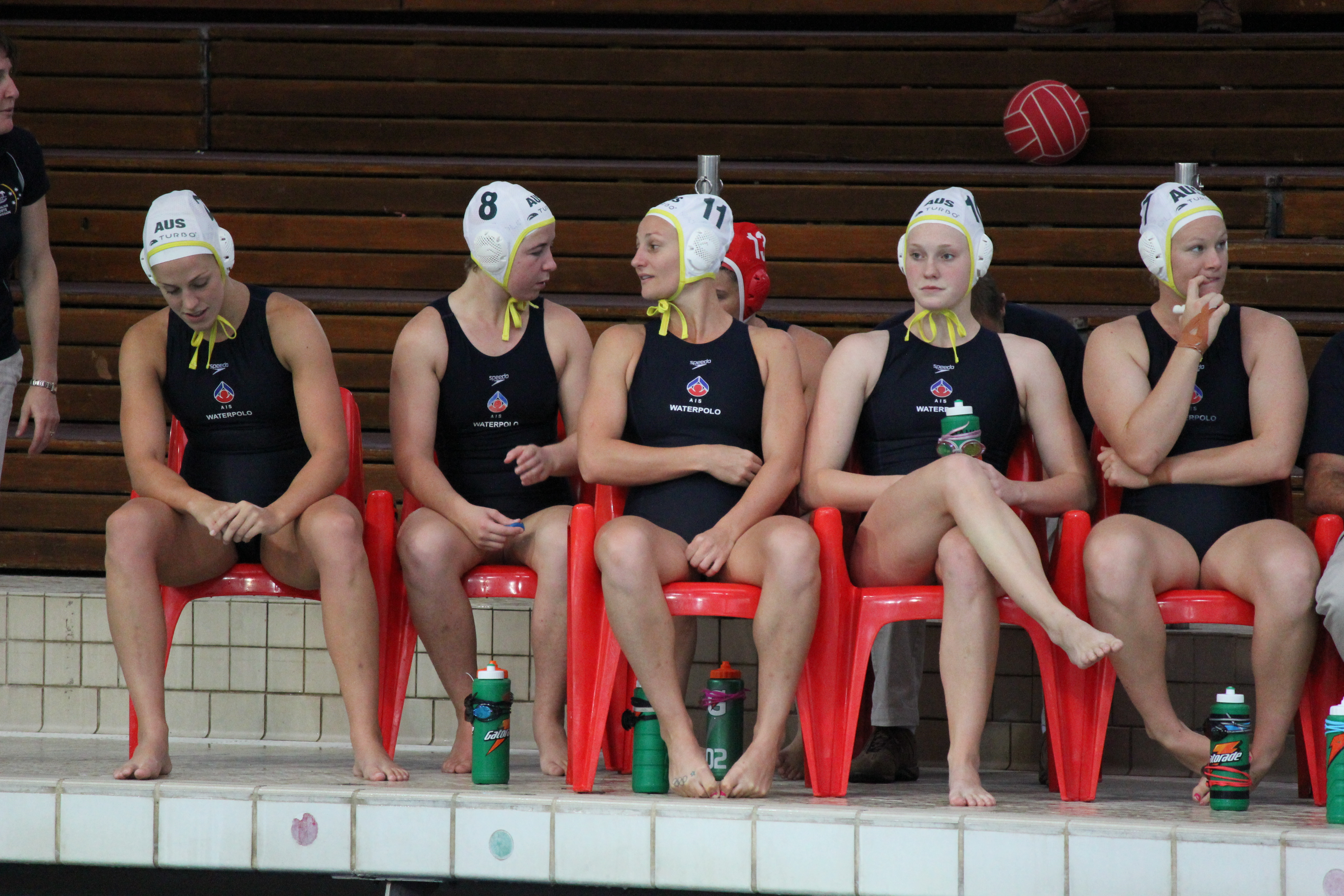
The third of a five-game test series against the Great Britain women's national water polo team on 25 February 2012. Australia won 15–6. On the far left is Knox, then Zoe Arancini, Melissa Rippon, Rowena Webster and Hannah Buckling.

In August 2010, Knox was a member of the Australian national side at a training camp at the Australian Institute of Sport. During the camp, she participated in a series of scrimmages against the United States. That month, she also represented Australia at the Six Nations Cup that was held in Sydney. She was a member of the Stingers squad that competed in the 2010 FINA World Cup. She was again the captain during this tournament, and on the second day of the competition, helped lead her team to a 7–5 victory of the United States. She competed Australia's 10–8 defeat of Russia. Her coach was quoted in The Age about her performance in the match, saying "Bronwen Knox was excellent at centre back and the pressure allowed us to get steals and counter-attacks." In the team's 10–8 final victory over the United States, she scored two goals. In April 2011, she attended a training camp at the Australian Institute of Sport where the coach was "selecting a team for the major championships over winter." In 2011, she was one of five Queensland women to compete for the Australian Stingers in the FINA World League competition held in Auckland, New Zealand. In a May 2011 match against China, she scored three goals in a 9–7 game that saw Australia score six goals in the second period.

In July 2011, Knox was a member of the Australian Stingers that competed in the 2011 FINA World Championships in Shanghai as a field player. In preparation for this tournament, she attended a team training camp in Perth, Western Australia. She competed in the Pan Pacific Championships in January 2012 for the Australian Stingers. In February 2012, she was named as a member of the 2012 Summer Olympics training squad. She was part of the Stingers squad that competed in a five-game test against Great Britain at the AIS in late February 2012. This was the team's first matches against Great Britain's national team in six years. In the first game of the test series on 21 February 2012 that Australia won 13–5, she scored three goals.

Knox was a member of the Australian Stingrays squad that competed at the Tokyo 2020 Olympics. By finishing second in their pool, the Aussie Stingers went through to the quarterfinals. They were beaten 8-9 by Russia and therefore did not compete for an Olympic medal.

== Post playing ==
Knox was the Deputy Chef de Mission to help manage the Australian team on the ground at the 2024 Paris Olympics.

== See also ==
- Australia women's Olympic water polo team records and statistics
- List of Olympic medalists in water polo (women)
- List of players who have appeared in multiple women's Olympic water polo tournaments
- List of women's Olympic water polo tournament top goalscorers
- List of World Aquatics Championships medalists in water polo
