= Sophie Smith =

Australian water polo player (born 1986)

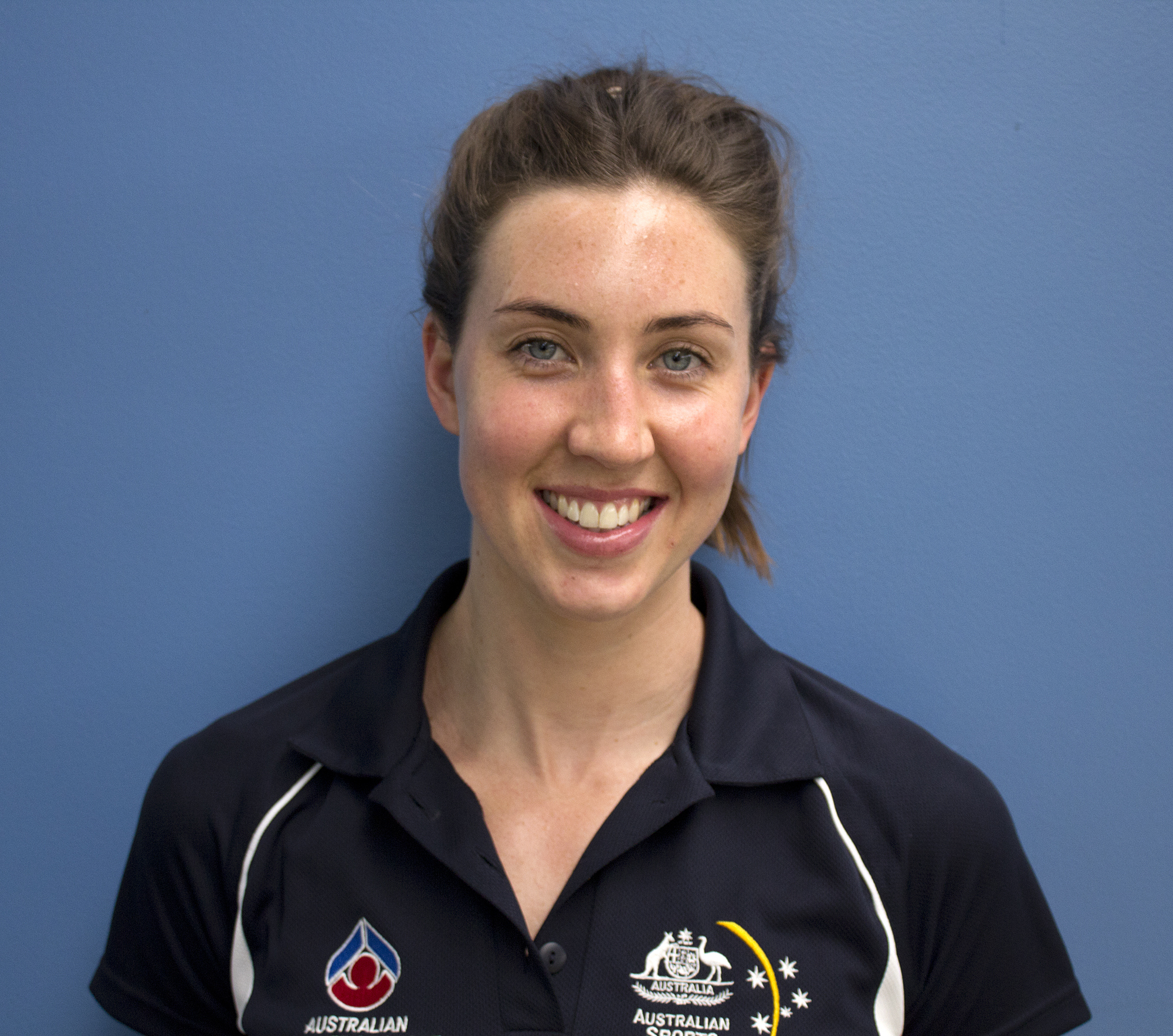

Personal information
- Born: 26 February 1986 (age 40) Brisbane, Queensland
- Height: 181 cm (5 ft 11 in) (2011)
- Weight: 67 kg (148 lb) (2011)

Sport
- Country: Australia
- Sport: Water polo
- Event: Women's team
- College team: Hartwick College
- Club: Queensland Breakers
Medal record
Women's water polo
Representing Australia
Olympic Games
Bronze medal – third place	2012 London	Team competition
FINA Junior World Championships
Bronze medal – third place	2005 Championships	Team competition
FINA Women's Water Polo World Cup
Silver medal – second place	2010 World Cup	Team competition

Sophie Smith (born 26 February 1986) is an Australian water polo player. Her position of choice is centre back/drive. She has played for the Victorian Tigers and the Queensland Breakers in the National Water Polo League. She has represented Australia in water polo on the junior and senior level, winning a bronze medal at the 2012 Summer Olympics, 2005 FINA Junior World Championships and at the 2010 FINA Women's Water Polo World Cup.

== Early life and education ==
Smith was born on 26 February 1986 in Brisbane. She attended the Brisbane Girls Grammar School. In 2005, she was living in Brisbane, Queensland. She attended Hartwick College in New York on a water polo scholarship. Smith is a student at the Queensland University of Technology, where she is completing a degree part-time in Bachelor of Creative Industries with a focus on fashion design. She has a job working for Kim Ring, a Brisbane stylist, and does work as a styling assistant and make up artist.

== Water polo ==
She is introduced along with other players on the national team before the first game in the Australia versus Great Britain test.

Smith is a centre back/driver and prefers to wear cap number 3. She started playing water polo as a thirteen-year-old while at the Brisbane Grammar School.

=== Club water polo ===
Smith currently plays club water polo for the Queensland Breakers in the National Water Polo League, and was with the team for their 2009 season. She has also played for the Brisbane Barracudas, and was on the 2008 squad. The annual match between KFC Breakers and Barracudas is one the Courier Mail considers a grudge match. She participated in the 2008 edition with her team. In 2012, she played for the Victorian Tigers. She has also played club polo in the United States and Italy. She played water polo on the university level for Hartwick College. In 2008, Smith played for an Australian Institute of Sport team.

=== Junior national team ===
Smith has represented Australia on the junior national level. In 2004, she was a member of the team that toured Europe in July and August. She was part of the Australian junior national team that competed at the 2005 World Junior Championships held in Perth, Western Australia. The team beat Greece 10-4 for the bronze medal game. The team's only loss in the tournament was a 4–5 loss to the United States.

=== Senior national team ===
Smith is a member of the Australian Stingers, having always wanted to get on the team. Her first major international competition was the 2009 FINA World Championships held in Rome.

Smith was a member of the Stingers squad that competed at the 2010 FINA World Cup in Christchurch, New Zealand. In Australia's semi-final victory over Russia, she fouled out. In May 2010, she was a member of the team that competed at the FINA World League Asia-Oceania zone held in Osaka, Japan and Tianjin, China. In 2011, she was one of five Queensland women to compete for the Australians Stingers at the FINA World League competition held in Auckland, New Zealand. In July the same year, she was a member of the Australian Stingers that competed in the 2011 FINA World Championships in Shanghai. In preparation for this tournament, she attended a team training camp in Perth, Western Australia. She competed in the Pan Pacific Championships in January 2012 for the Australian Barbarians. In February 2012, she was named to the final training squad for the 2012 Summer Olympics, and as such, will attend a training camp starting on 20 February 2012 at the Australian Institute of Sport. She was selected to compete at the 2012 Olympics. She was part of the Stingers squad that competed in a five-game test against Great Britain at the AIS in late February 2012. This was the team's first matches against Great Britain's national team in six years.

== See also ==
- List of Olympic medalists in water polo (women)
