= 2011 FINA Women's Water Polo World League =

- League: FINA Water Polo World League
- Sport: Water Polo
- Duration: 2011

Super Final

FINA Women's Water Polo World League seasons
- ← 2010 2012 →

The 2011 FINA Women's Water Polo World League was the eighth edition of the event, organised by the world's governing body in aquatics, the FINA. After playing in groups within the same continent, eight teams qualify to play in a final tournament, called the Super Final in Tianjin, China from June 14 to June 19, 2011.

== Super Final ==
- June, 14 – June 19, 2011, Tianjin, China

=== Seeding ===
Group A	Group B
United States; China; Greece; Italy	Russia; Australia; Spain; Canada

=== Knockout stage ===
Quarterfinals
17 June 2011
China	14
Spain	12
17 June 2011
Italy	21
Russia	20
17 June 2011
Greece	8
Australia	10
17 June 2011
United States	8
Canada	6

Semifinals
18 June 2011
China	5
Italy	7
18 June 2011
Australia	5
United States	11

Final
19 June 2011
Italy	7
United States	9
Third place game
19 June 2011
Australia	7
China	5

==== Semifinals ====
All times are CST (UTC+8)

18 June 2011; 17:30	Australia	7–8	United States	Tianjin, China
18 June 2011; 17:30	Score by quarters: 4-2, 2-3, 0-2, 1-1			Tianjin, China

18 June 2011; 19:00	China	5–7	Italy	Tianjin, China
18 June 2011; 19:00	Score by quarters: 1-2, 2-1, 2-4, 0-0			Tianjin, China

==== Bronze medal match ====
All times are CST (UTC+8)

19 June 2011; 17:30	Australia	7–5	China	Tianjin, China
19 June 2011; 17:30	Score by quarters: 1-2, 2-2, 2-1, 2-0			Tianjin, China

==== Final ====
All times are CST (UTC+8)

19 June 2011; 19:00	Italy	7–9	United States	Tianjin, China
19 June 2011; 19:00	Score by quarters: 1-2, 3-1, 1-3, 2-3			Tianjin, China

5th–8th Places

Semifinals
18 June 2011
Spain	12
Russia	14
18 June 2011
Greece	9
Canada	13

Fifth place
19 June 2011
Russia	14
Canada	9
Seventh place
19 June 2011
Spain	8
Greece	14

=== Final ranking ===
Rank	Team
Gold medal	United States
Silver medal	Italy
Bronze medal	Australia
4	China
5	Russia
6	Canada
7	Greece
8	Spain

2011 Women's FINA Water Polo World League

United States
Sixth title

Team Roster

Betsey Armstrong, Heather Petri, Melissa Seidemann, Brenda Villa(C), Lauren Wenger, Courtney Mathewson, Jessica Steffens, Lolo Silver, Elsie Windes, Kelly Rulon, Annika Dries, Kami Craig, Tumua Anae, Maggie Steffens, Anne Belden. Head coach: Adam Krikorian.

== Individual awards ==
- Top Scorer
  - Sofya Konukh (RUS) — 14 goals
- Media All Star Team
  - Elizabeth Armstrong (USA) — Goalkeaper
  - Olga Beliaeva (RUS) — Center Forward
  - Brenda Villa (USA)
  - Giulia Emmolo (ITA)
  - Sofya Konukh (RUS)
  - Kate Gynther (AUS)
  - Ma Huanhuan (CHN)
