= 2007 FINA Women's Water Polo World League =

Water polo league

- League: FINA Water Polo World League
- Sport: Water Polo

FINA Women's Water Polo World League seasons
- ← 2006 2008 →

The 2007 FINA Women's Water Polo World League was the fourth edition of the event, organised by the world's governing body in aquatics, the FINA. Three qualification tournaments were held, before the final round took off in the Parc Jean Drapeau Aquatic Centre in Montreal, Quebec, Canada, from July 4 to July 8, 2007.

== Preliminary round ==
=== Americas ===
Held from June 1 to June 3, 2007, in Los Alamitos, United States

- June 1, 2007

Puerto Rico	4–19	Canada

- June 2, 2007

United States	20–3	Puerto Rico

- June 3, 2007

United States	12–5	Canada

	Team	Points	G	W	D	L	GF	GA
1.	United States	6	2	2	0	0	32	8
2.	Canada	3	2	1	0	1	24	16
3.	Puerto Rico	0	2	0	0	2	7	39

=== Asia and Oceania ===
Held from May 29 to June 3, 2007, in Tianjin, PR China

- May 29, 2007

Australia	14–6	New Zealand
China	8–6	Japan

- May 30, 2007

Japan	13–9	New Zealand
China	6–11	Australia

- May 31, 2007

Japan	2–19	Australia
China	9–8	New Zealand

- June 1, 2007

Australia	16–8	New Zealand
China	12–11	Japan

- June 2, 2007

Japan	11–10	New Zealand
China	5–9	Australia

- June 3, 2007

Japan	1–13	Australia
China	13–7	New Zealand

	Team	Points	G	W	D	L	GF	GA
1.	Australia	18	6	6	0	0	82	28
2.	China	11	6	4	0	2	53	52
3.	Japan	7	6	2	0	4	44	71
4.	New Zealand	0	6	0	0	6	48	76

=== Europe ===
Held from June 13 to June 17, 2007, in Kirishi, Russia

- June 13, 2007

Hungary	9–12	Netherlands
Greece	13–11	Spain
Russia	22–9	Germany

- June 14, 2007

Germany	3–11	Netherlands
Spain	9–4	Hungary
Russia	9–10	Greece

- June 15, 2007

Netherlands	10–11	Spain
Greece	12–10	Germany
Hungary	6–16	Russia

- June 16, 2007

Germany	7–9	Spain
Greece	9–8	Hungary
Russia	10–11	Netherlands

- June 17, 2007

Netherlands	10–9	Greece
Germany	11–14	Hungary
Spain	17–11	Russia

	Team	Points	G	W	D	L	GF	GA
1.	Greece	12	5	4	0	1	53	48
2.	Spain	12	5	4	0	1	57	45
3.	Netherlands	12	5	4	0	1	54	42
4.	Russia	6	5	2	0	3	68	53
5.	Hungary	3	5	1	0	4	41	57
6.	Germany	0	5	0	0	5	40	68

== Final round ==
- Wednesday July 4, 2007

Greece	8–9	Australia
Spain	3–12	United States
China	5–13	Canada

- Thursday July 5, 2007

United States	9–8	Australia
Greece	12–7	China
Spain	8–9	Canada

- Friday July 6, 2007

Spain	12–11	Australia
China	2–9	United States
Greece	11–12	Canada

- Saturday July 7, 2007

Spain	14–7	China
Greece	4–5	United States
Australia	11–8	Canada

=== Standings ===
	Team	Points	G	W	D	L	GF	GA
1.	United States	15	5	5	0	0	35	17
2.	Australia	9	5	3	0	2	39	37
3.	Canada	8	5	3	0	2	42	35
4.	Greece	7	5	2	0	3	35	33
5.	Spain	6	5	2	0	3	37	39
6.	China	0	5	0	0	5	21	48

=== Play-offs ===
- Sunday July 8, 2007

Spain	19–8	China
Canada	4–6	Greece
United States	8–4	Australia

=== Final ranking ===
Rank	Team
Gold medal	United States
Silver medal	Australia
Bronze medal	Greece
4	Canada
5	Spain
6	China

2007 FINA Women's Water Polo World League

United States
Third title

== Individual awards ==
- Most Valuable Player
  - Kate Gynther (AUS)
- Best Goalkeeper
  - Victoria Brown (AUS)

RANK	TOPSCORERS	GOALS
1.	Blanca Gil (ESP)	36
2.	Kate Gynther (AUS)	25
3.	Antigoni Roumpesi (GRE)	21
3.	Angeliki Gerolymou (GRE)	21
5.	Evangelia Moraitidou (GRE)	18
5.	Jennifer Pareja (ESP)	18
7.	Suzie Fraser (AUS)	17
8.	Nikita Cuffe (AUS)	16
9.	Ekaterina Pantyulina (RUS)	15
9.	Ágnes Primász (HUN)	15
9.	Krystina Alogbo (CAN)	15
12.	Daniëlle de Bruijn (NED)	14
12.	María Carmen García (ESP)	14
14.	Iefke van Belkum (NED)	13
14.	Yumi Nakano (JPN)	13

== Statistics ==
- Total goals: 600
- Total matches: 30
- Goals per match: 20
- Total of scorers: 119
