= 2012 FINA Women's Water Polo World League =

- League: FINA Water Polo World League
- Sport: Water Polo
- Duration: 2012

Super Final

FINA Women's Water Polo World League seasons
- ← 2011 2013 →

The 2012 FINA Women's Water Polo World League is played between February and June 2012 and open to all women's water polo national teams. After playing in groups within the same continent, eight teams qualify to play in a final tournament, called the Super Final in Changshu, China from 29 May - 3 June 2012. The two teams that reach the final of the Super Final will be the first teams to quality for the water polo tournament of the 2013 World Aquatics Championships in Barcelona.

In the world league, there are specific rules that do not allow matches to end in a draw. If teams are level at the end of the 4th quarter of any world league match, the match will be decided by a penalty shootout. Teams earn points in the standings in group matches as follows:

- Match won in normal time - 3 points
- Match won in shootout - 2 points
- Match lost in shootout - 1 point
- Match lost in normal time - 0 points

== Draw ==
=== Americas ===
As there were only 3 entries, all teams in this region played in a single group.

=== Asia/Oceania ===
As there were only 4 entries, all teams in this region will play in a single group.

=== Europe ===
There were 8 entries into the league from Europe, and these were drawn into two groups of four teams. The teams were placed into groups based on their performance in the 2011 FINA Women's Water Polo World League.

Line	Country	2011 FINA Women's Water Polo World League result	Drawn into Group
1	Italy	2nd, Super Final	A
1	Russia	5th, Super Final	B
2	Greece	7th, Super Final	B
2	Spain	8th, Super Final	A
3	Hungary	3rd, Europe Group 1 (8 pts)	A
3	Great Britain	4th, Europe Group 1 (3 pts)	B
4	Germany	3rd, Europe Group 2 (0 pts)	A
4	Netherlands	Did not participate	B

== Americas League ==
All teams played the other teams twice. All matches were held in various locations in Orange County, California, United States from 20–22 February 2012. The top two teams advanced to the Super Final.

Team advances to Super Final

	Team	G	W	SOW	SOL	L	GF	GA	Diff	Points
1.	United States	4	4	0	0	0	60	20	+40	12
2.	Canada	4	2	0	0	2	47	33	+14	6
3.	Brazil	4	0	0	0	4	11	65	-54	0

20 February 2012; 10:30 PST (UTC-8)	Scoresheet	United States	19–1	Brazil	Los Alamitos Joint Forces Training Base, Los Alamitos, California, United States

20 February 2012; 19:00 PST (UTC-8)	Scoresheet	United States	13–11	Canada	Commerce Aquatorium, Commerce, California, United States

21 February 2012; 10:30 PST (UTC-8)	Scoresheet	Canada	16–1	Brazil	Los Alamitos Joint Forces Training Base, Los Alamitos, California, United States

21 February 2012; 19:00 PST (UTC-8)	Scoresheet	United States	17–1	Brazil	Arnold O. Beckman High School, Irvine, California, United States

22 February 2012; 10:30 PST (UTC-8)	Scoresheet	Canada	13–8	Brazil	Los Alamitos Joint Forces Training Base, Los Alamitos, California, United States

22 February 2012; 19:00 PST (UTC-8)	Scoresheet	United States	11–7	Canada	Woollett Aquatics Center, Irvine, California, United States

== Asia/Oceania League ==
All teams will play the other teams twice. The first round-robin will be held at the Shanghai Oriental Sports Center in Shanghai and the second round-robin will be held from 8–12 May 2012 at the Chiba International Swimming Complex in Narashino, Chiba, Japan. The winner will advance to the Super Final. As China has already qualified as the hosts, if they win the Asia/Oceania League, the second-placed team will advance.

Team advances to Super Final

	Team	G	W	SOW	SOL	L	GF	GA	Diff	Points
1.	China	4	3	0	0	1	53	28	+25	9
2.	Australia	4	3	0	0	1	45	32	+13	9
3.	Japan	4	0	0	0	4	21	59	-38	0

== Europe League ==
All teams will play the other teams in their group twice. All games in Group A will be played from 10–13 May 2012 in Syracuse, Sicily, Italy, and all games in Group B will be played from 10–13 May 2012 in Volos, Greece. The top two teams in each group will advance to the Super Final.

Team advances to Super Final

=== Group A ===
	Team	G	W	SOW	SOL	L	GF	GA	Diff	Points
1.	Germany	6	3	1	0	2	55	55	0	11
2.	Italy	6	3	0	1	2	55	43	+12	10
3.	Hungary	6	3	0	1	2	63	60	+3	0
4.	Spain	6	1	1	0	4	47	62	-15	5

=== Group B ===
	Team	G	W	SOW	SOL	L	GF	GA	Diff	Points
1.	Greece	6	6	0	0	0	55	38	+17	18
2.	Russia	6	4	0	0	2	57	51	+6	12
3.	Netherlands	6	2	0	0	4	41	49	-8	6
4.	Great Britain	6	0	0	0	6	39	54	-15	0

10 May 2012; 18:30 EEST (UTC+3)	Russia	9–8	Great Britain	Vasilis Polymeros Pool, Nea Ionia, Volos

10 May 2012; 20:15 EEST (UTC+3)	Greece	7–4	Netherlands	Vasilis Polymeros Pool, Nea Ionia, Volos

11 May 2012; 10:30 EEST (UTC+3)	Russia	13–9	Netherlands	Vasilis Polymeros Pool, Nea Ionia, Volos

11 May 2012; 12:15 EEST (UTC+3)	Greece	8–7	Great Britain	Vasilis Polymeros Pool, Nea Ionia, Volos

11 May 2012; 18:30 EEST (UTC+3)	Netherlands	8–7	Great Britain	Vasilis Polymeros Pool, Nea Ionia, Volos

11 May 2012; 20:15 EEST (UTC+3)	Greece	7–6	Russia	Vasilis Polymeros Pool, Nea Ionia, Volos

12 May 2012; 10:30 EEST (UTC+3)	Russia	11–7	Great Britain	Vasilis Polymeros Pool, Nea Ionia, Volos

12 May 2012; 12:15 EEST (UTC+3)	Greece	10–5	Netherlands	Vasilis Polymeros Pool, Nea Ionia, Volos

12 May 2012; 18:30 EEST (UTC+3)	Russia	8–7	Netherlands	Vasilis Polymeros Pool, Nea Ionia, Volos

12 May 2012; 20:15 EEST (UTC+3)	Greece	10–6	Great Britain	Vasilis Polymeros Pool, Nea Ionia, Volos

13 May 2012; 10:30 EEST (UTC+3)	Netherlands	8–4	Great Britain	Vasilis Polymeros Pool, Nea Ionia, Volos

13 May 2012; 12:15 EEST (UTC+3)	Greece	13–10	Russia	Vasilis Polymeros Pool, Nea Ionia, Volos

== Super Final ==
- May, 29 - June, 3, 2012, Changshu, China.

=== Preliminary round: Group A ===
	Team	G	W	SOW	SOL	L	GF	GA	Diff	Points
1.	United States	3	3	0	0	0	35	13	+22	9
2.	China	3	2	0	0	1	33	23	+10	6
3.	Greece	3	1	0	0	2	29	31	-2	3
4.	Germany	3	0	0	0	3	18	48	-30	0

=== Preliminary round: Group B ===
	Team	G	W	SOW	SOL	L	GF	GA	Diff	Points
1.	Australia	3	2	1	0	0	38	12	+26	8
2.	Russia	3	2	0	1	0	32	16	+16	7
3.	Canada	3	1	0	0	2	20	34	+14	3
4.	Italy	3	0	0	0	3	9	37	-28	0

=== Final round ===
Quarterfinal
A1	United States	11
B4	Italy	2
A3	Greece	11
B2	Russia	9
A2	China	13
B3	Canada	7
A4	Germany	0
B1	Australia	18

Semifinal
A1	United States	7
A3	Greece	6
A2	China	7
B1	Australia	8

Final
A1	United States	6
B1	Australia	4
Third place
A3	Greece	8
A2	China	7

==== Bronze-medal match ====
3 June 2012	China	7–8	Greece	Changshu, China
3 June 2012	Score by quarters: 1-2, 4-2, 1-2, 1-2			Changshu, China

==== Final ====
3 June 2012	Australia	4–6	United States	Changshu, China
3 June 2012	Score by quarters: 1-2, 3-1, 0-1, 0-2			Changshu, China

=== Final ranking ===
Rank	Team
Gold medal	United States
Silver medal	Australia
Bronze medal	Greece
4	China
5	Russia
6	Germany
7	Canada
8	Italy

2012 FINA Women's Water Polo World League

United States
Seventh title

Team Roster

Betsey Armstrong, Heather Petri, Melissa Seidemann, Brenda Villa (C), Lauren Wenger, Maggie Steffens, Courtney Mathewson, Jessica Steffens, Elsie Windes, Kelly Rulon, Annika Dries, Kami Craig, Tumua Anae. Head coach: Adam Krikorian.
