= 2010 FINA Women's Water Polo World League =

- League: FINA Water Polo World League
- Sport: Water Polo
- Duration: 2010

Super Final

FINA Women's Water Polo World League seasons
- ← 2009 2011 →

The 2010 FINA Women's Water Polo World League was the seventh edition of the event, organised by the world's governing body in aquatics, the FINA. After playing in groups within the same continent, eight teams qualify to play in a final tournament, called the Super Final in La Jolla, San Diego, California from June 28 to July 3, 2010.

== Super Final ==
- June, 28 – July 3, 2010, La Jolla, San Diego, California

=== Seeding ===
| Group A | Group B |
|---|---|
| China; Hungary; Netherlands; Canada | United States; Australia; Greece; Russia |

=== Knockout stage ===
Quarterfinals
1 July 2010
Hungary | 13
Greece | 14
1 July 2010
Canada | 4
United States | 7
1 July 2010
Netherlands | 7
Australia | 10
1 July 2010
China | 6
Russia | 10

Semifinals
2 July 2010
Greece | 7
United States | 9
2 July 2010
Australia | 8
Russia | 7

Final
3 July 2010
Australia | 11
United States | 12
Third place game
3 July 2010
Russia | 7
Greece | 8

==== Semifinals ====
All times are PST (UTC-8)

| 3 July 2010; 17:30 | Australia | 8–7 | Russia | La Jolla, San Diego, California |
| 3 July 2010; 17:30 | Score by quarters: 1-2, 1-2, 3-0, 3-3 | | | La Jolla, San Diego, California |

| 3 July 2010; 19:00 | Greece | 7–9 | United States | La Jolla, San Diego, California |
| 3 July 2010; 19:00 | Score by quarters: 1-2, 0-3, 2-2, 4-2 | | | La Jolla, San Diego, California |

==== Bronze medal match ====
All times are PST (UTC-8)

| 3 July 2010; 15:00 | Russia | 7–8 (PSO) | Greece | La Jolla, San Diego, California |
| 3 July 2010; 15:00 | Score by quarters: 1-2, 1-0, 1-1, 2-2 PSO: 2-3 | | | La Jolla, San Diego, California |

==== Final ====
All times are PST (UTC-8)

| 3 July 2010; 16:30 | Australia | 11–12 (PSO) | United States | La Jolla, San Diego, California |
| 3 July 2010; 16:30 | Score by quarters: 1-2, 1-2, 2-1, 3-2 PSO: 4-5 | | | La Jolla, San Diego, California |

5th–8th Places

Semifinals
2 July 2010
Hungary | 11
Canada | 9
2 July 2010
Netherlands | 10
China | 13

Fifth place
3 July 2010
Hungary | 6
China | 8
Seventh place
3 July 2010
Canada | 6
Netherlands | 8

=== Final ranking ===
| Rank | Team |
|---|---|
| Gold medal | United States |
| Silver medal | Australia |
| Bronze medal | Greece |
| 4 | Russia |
| 5 | China |
| 6 | Hungary |
| 7 | Netherlands |
| 8 | Canada |

2010 Women's FINA Water Polo World League

United States
Fifth title

Team Roster

Betsey Armstrong, Heather Petri, Erika Figge, Brenda Villa (C), Lauren Wenger, Courtney Mathewson, Jessica Steffens, Lolo Silver, Elsie Windes, Kelly Rulon, Annika Dries, Kami Craig, Emily Feher, Melissa Seidemann, Maggie Steffens. Head coach: Adam Krikorian.

== Individual awards ==
- Most Valuable Player
  - Brenda Villa (USA)
- Top Scorer
  - Dóra Kisteleki (HUN) — 15 goals
- Media All Star Team
  - Elizabeth Armstrong (USA) — Goalkeaper
  - Kami Craig (USA) — Center Forward
  - Brenda Villa (USA)
  - Iefke Van Belkum (NED)
  - Gabriella Szűcs (HUN)
  - Sofya Konukh (RUS)
  - Bronwen Knox (AUS)
  - Gemma Beadsworth (AUS)
