= Elise Norwood =

Australian water polo player

Personal information
- Full name: Elise Simone Ashton
- Born: Elise Simone Norwood; 18 June 1981 (age 45) Sydney, Australia
- Spouse: Chris Ashton (m. 2005)
Medal record
Women's water polo
Representing Australia
Commonwealth Championships
Gold medal – first place	2002 Manchester	Team competition

Elise Simone Ashton (née Norwood, born 18 June 1981) is an Australian former water polo player. She was captain of the Australia women's national water polo team. She is a right-handed utility and played her 100th international game on 20 August 2005 against the Netherlands during the FINA World League Final series in Kirishi, Russia.

Elise Ashton played for Sydney University teams beginning at age 13 years ol.d She was a member of national and New South Wales junior teams before being selected for the senior team in 2001. Her achievements include a gold medal at the 2002 Commonwealth Championships, Manchester, England and 4th place at the 2004 Olympic Games, Athens, Greece.

== Personal life ==
Elise is the fifth of the six daughters of Pam and Russell Norwood. Her other sisters are all accomplished in their own fields, including veterinary practices, school teaching, medical practices, and community service.

In 2005, she married Chris Ashton. The couple have two children.
