= Melissa Seidemann =

American water polo player (born 1990)

Personal information
- Full name: Melissa Jon Seidemann
- Nationality: American
- Born: June 26, 1990 (age 36) Hoffman Estates, Illinois, U.S.
- Height: 1.83 m (6 ft 0 in)
- Weight: 104 kg (229 lb)

Sport
- Country: United States
- Sport: Water polo
- College team: Stanford University
Medal record
Olympic Games
Gold medal – first place	2012 London	Team
Gold medal – first place	2016 Rio de Janeiro	Team
Gold medal – first place	2020 Tokyo	Team
World Championships
Gold medal – first place	2015 Kazan	Team
Gold medal – first place	2017 Budapest	Team
Gold medal – first place	2019 Gwangju	Team
Pan American Games
Gold medal – first place	2011 Guadalajara	Team
Gold medal – first place	2019 Lima	Team
FINA World Cup
Gold medal – first place	2010 New Zealand
FINA World League
Gold medal – first place	2010 La Jolla
Gold medal – first place	2011 Tianjin
Gold medal – first place	2012 Changshu
Bronze medal – third place	2013 Beijing

Melissa Jon Seidemann (born June 26, 1990) is an American water polo player. She won the National Championship with Stanford University in 2011. She also won the gold medal with the United States national team in the 2012 Summer Olympics and 2016 Summer Olympics.

== Career ==
=== High school ===
A 2008 graduate of College Park High School in Pleasant Hill, California, Seidemann competed on their water polo team all four years of high school, and competed for three years on the swim team. She also played soccer as a preparation. Seidemann captained the water polo team in 2007 and 2008, and helped lead her team to a DFAL title as a senior, then being named a NISCA All-American, and Team MVP in 2007. She then went on to be a member of the U.S. Youth National Team in 2006, which won the gold medal at the Pan-American Junior Games, being the leading scorer in the tournament with 20 goals. Seidemann was also a member of the Youth National Team, going undefeated in Sydney, Australia the summer of 2007. She was also on the team that competed in the 2008 Global Championships. Seidemann earned All-America honors at the U.S. Water Polo 20/U Nationals.

=== College ===
Seidemann joined the Stanford University women's water polo team in 2009. As a freshman, she led the team with 59 goals, scoring at least four goals in a game on five occasions. She led Stanford in scoring again the following year, and was nominated to the ACWPC All-America First Team in 2010. In 2011, Seidemann had her third-straight 50-goal season, finishing second on Stanford with 51 goals. She also scored what proved to be the winning goal in the NCAA Championship title game.

Seidemann took a leave of absence from Stanford in 2012 so she could train with the U.S. national water polo team, but graduated in 2013 with a degree in psychology. In 2023, Seidemann was inducted into the Stanford Athletics Hall of Fame.

=== International ===
Seidemann first started playing for the U.S. national team in 2010. She scored three goals in that year's FINA World League Super Final and two goals in the FINA World Cup, helping the U.S. win both events.

The following year, the U.S. won the FINA World League Super Final again, with Seidemann scoring twice. She scored 11 goals in the Pan American Games, ranking third on the team, and the U.S. won the gold medal and qualified for the 2012 Summer Olympics. The U.S. went on to win gold at the Olympics as well. She was also part of the 2016 US olympic team, winning her second Olympic gold medal that year.

== Personal ==
Seidemann has one older sister, Lauren, and a younger sister, Natalie. Lauren is the women's water polo head coach at College Park High School in Pleasant Hill, California, and Natalie is currently a center on the UC Irvine women's water polo team.

== See also ==
- United States women's Olympic water polo team records and statistics
- List of Olympic champions in women's water polo
- List of Olympic medalists in water polo (women)
- List of world champions in women's water polo
- List of World Aquatics Championships medalists in water polo
