= Australia women's national water polo team =

Australia
- FINA code: AUS
- Nickname(s): Stingers
- Association: Water Polo Australia
- Confederation: OSA (Oceania)
- Head coach: Rebecca Rippon
- Asst coach: Eddie Denis; Taryn Woods
- Captain: Bronte Halligan

FINA ranking (since 2008)
- Current: 7 (as of 9 August 2021)
- Highest: 2 (2010)
- Lowest: 7 (2016, 2017, 2018, 2021)

Olympic Games (team statistics)
- Appearances: 7 (first in 2000)
- Best result: (gold) (2000)

World Championship
- Appearances: 18 (first in 1986)
- Best result: (gold) (1986)

World Cup
- Appearances: 19 (first in 1979)
- Best result: (gold) (1984, 1995, 2006)

World League
- Appearances: 16 (first in 2004)
- Best result: (silver) (2007, 2010, 2012, 2015)

Commonwealth Championship
- Appearances: 2 (first in 2002)
- Best result: (gold) (2002, 2006)

Media
- Website: waterpoloaustralia.com.au
Medal record
Women's water polo
Olympic Games
Gold medal – first place	2000 Sydney	Team
Silver medal – second place	2024 Paris	Team
Bronze medal – third place	2008 Beijing	Team
Bronze medal – third place	2012 London	Team
World Championship
Gold medal – first place	1986 Madrid	Team
Silver medal – second place	2007 Melbourne	Team
Silver medal – second place	2013 Barcelona	Team
Bronze medal – third place	1998 Perth	Team
Bronze medal – third place	2019 Gwangju	Team
World Cup
Gold medal – first place	1984 Irvine
Gold medal – first place	1995 Sydney
Gold medal – first place	2006 Tianjin
Silver medal – second place	1991 Long Beach
Silver medal – second place	1999 Winnipeg
Silver medal – second place	2010 Christchurch
Silver medal – second place	2014 Khanty-Mansiysk
Bronze medal – third place	1979 Merced
Bronze medal – third place	1981 Brisbane
Bronze medal – third place	1983 Sainte-Foy
Bronze medal – third place	1997 Nancy
Bronze medal – third place	2018 Surgut
Bronze medal – third place	2026 Sydney
World League
Silver medal – second place	2007 Montreal
Silver medal – second place	2010 La Jolla
Silver medal – second place	2012 Changshu
Silver medal – second place	2015 Shanghai
Bronze medal – third place	2005 Kirishi
Bronze medal – third place	2008 Santa Cruz
Bronze medal – third place	2009 Kirishi
Bronze medal – third place	2011 Tianjin
Bronze medal – third place	2014 Kunshan
Bronze medal – third place	2016 Shanghai
Commonwealth Championships
Gold medal – first place	2002 Manchester
Gold medal – first place	2006 Perth

The Australia national women's water polo team represents Australia in women's international water polo competitions and is controlled by Water Polo Australia. It was one of the most successful women's water polo teams in the world. It is currently organised into the Asia/Oceania regional group.

== History ==
The Australia women's water polo team played their first international in 1975. Later, they received 6th place at the 1994 World Aquatics Championships in Rome, Italy. The next year, they won the women's Water polo World Cup at home in Sydney, Australia, in 1995. In 1996, the women won the silver medal in the Olympic Year Tournament behind the Netherlands, then finished with bronze in the following year's World Cup in Nancy, France. Australia continued their mid-1990s run by winning the bronze medal at the 1998 World Aquatics Championships in Perth. They continued with four international tournaments wins and other close finished in the Netherlands, Italy, the United States and Hungary throught 1998 and 1999.

After an 14 month winning streak, they only managed the silver at the 1999 world cup in Winnipeg, Canada.

Another success came in 1997 when it was announced that women's Water polo would be included in the Olympic Games for the first time at their home Olympics in 2000 Summer Olympics.

Having had an build up to the Sydney 2000, the team went into the first Olympic tournament at home. They lost one match to the Dutch side in that historic campaign, on the way to winning their inaugural women's Olympic gold medal in front of their home crowd.

In the Olympic final, the US and Australia sides were tied 3–3 with 1.3 seconds remaining on the clock, when Yvette Higgins completed a nine-metre shot from a free throw. The ball crossed the goal-line 0.2s from the final hooter to give Australia a 4–3 win, and the gold medal.

The Australia gold team medalists were: Naomi Castle, Jo Fox, Bridgette Gusterson (C), Simone Hankin, Kate Hooper, Yvette Higgins, Bronwyn Mayer, Gail Miller, Melissa Mills, Debbie Watson, Liz Weekes, Danielle Woodhouse, and Taryn Woods.

The team then had little Olympic success in 2001, only managing 5th in the World Championships of that year. This dip in form was short lived, however, as they won the inaugural Commonwealth Water Polo Championships title in Manchester, England in 2002, beating world No 3 Canada 6–5 in the final.

Australia then suffered another patch, finishing 7th at the 2003 World Aquatics Championships in Barcelona, Spain, 4th at the 2004 Summer Olympics in Athens, and 6th at the 2005 World Aquatics Championships in Montreal, Quebec, Canada.

The team then took the bronze award at the 2005 FINA Water Polo World League event in Kirishi, Russia, and at the 2007 Water polo world championship in Melbourne, Australia by taking the silver medal, after losing 5–6 to the US team.

At the 2008 Summer Olympics, the team took the bronze medal after beating Hungary for 3rd place in a penalty shootout.

== Olympic record ==
Year	Games	Position
2000	2000 Summer Olympics, Sydney, New South Wales, Australia	Gold medal (won 6–3 v Russia, lost 4–5 v Netherlands, won 7–6 v USA, won 9–4 v Canada, won 7–6 v Russia, won 4–3 v USA (gold medal match))
2004	2004 Summer Olympics, Athens, Greece	4th (won 6–5 v Italy, lost 4–9 v Kazakhstan, tie 7–7 v Greece, lost 2–6 v Greece, lost 5–6 v USA (bronze medal match)).
2008	2008 Summer Olympics, Beijing, China	Bronze medal (won 8–6 v Greece, tie 7–7 v Hungary, won 10–9 v Netherlands, won 12–11 v China, lost 9–8 v USA, won 8–8 with penalty shootout 4–3 v Hungary (bronze medal match)).
2012	2012 Summer Olympics, London, Great Britain	Bronze medal (won 10–8 v Italy, won 16–3 v Great Britain, won 11–8 v Russia, won 16–16 with penalty shootout 4–2 v China, lost 9–11 v USA, won 13–11 after overtime v Hungary (bronze medal match)).
2016	2016 Summer Olympics, Rio de Janeiro, Brazil	6th (won 14–4 Russia, lost 7–8 Italy, won 11–3 v Brazil, lost 8–8 Hungary on penalty shootout, won 11–4 Brazil, lost 10–12 Spain (5th–6th playoff)
2024	2024 Summer Olympics, Paris, France	Silver medal (won 7–4 China, won 15–14 Netherlands on penalty shootout, won 10–7 Canada, won 14–12 Hungary on penalty shootout, won 9–6 Greece, won 14–13 United on penalty shootout (semi-final), lost 9–11 Spain (final)

== Honours ==
- Water polo at the Summer Olympics:
  - Gold medal 2000 Sydney Olympics
  - Silver medal 2024 Paris Olympics
  - Bronze medal 2008 Beijing Olympics
  - Bronze medal 2012 London Olympics
- World Championships:
  - Gold medal 1986 Madrid
  - Silver medal 2007 Melbourne
  - Silver medal 2013 Barcelona
  - Bronze medal 1998 Perth
  - Bronze medal 2019 Gwangju
- FINA World Cup:
  - Gold medal 1984 Los Angeles
  - Gold medal 1995 Sydney
  - Gold medal 2006 Tianjin
  - Silver medal 1991 Long Beach
  - Silver medal 1999 Winnipeg
  - Silver medal 2010 Christchurch
  - Silver medal 2014 Khanty-Mansiysk
  - Bronze medal 1979 Merced, California
  - Bronze medal 1981 Brisbane
  - Bronze medal 1983 Quebec City
  - Bronze medal 1997 Nancy
  - Bronze medal 2026 Sydney
- Commonwealth Water Polo Championships:
  - Gold medal Manchester 2002
  - Gold medal Perth 2006

== Results ==
=== Olympic Games ===
- 2000 – 1st place
- 2004 – 4th place
- 2008 – 3rd place
- 2012 – 3rd place
- 2016 – 6th place
- 2020 – 5th place
- 2024 – 2nd place

=== Olympic Year Tournament ===
- 1996 – 2nd place

=== World Championship ===
- 1986 – 1st place
- 1991 – 5th place
- 1994 – 6th place
- 1998 – 3rd place
- 2001 – 5th place
- 2003 – 7th place
- 2005 – 6th place
- 2007 – 2nd place
- 2009 – 6th place
- 2011 – 5th place
- 2013 – 2nd place
- 2015 – 4th place
- 2017 – 8th place
- 2019 – 3rd place
- 2022 – 6th place
- 2023 – 4th place
- 2024 – 6th place
- 2025 – 6th place

=== World Cup ===
- 1979 – 3rd place
- 1980 – 4th place
- 1981 – 3rd place
- 1983 – 3rd place
- 1984 – 1st place
- 1988 – 5th place
- 1989 – 5th place
- 1991 – 2nd place
- 1993 – 4th place
- 1995 – 1st place
- 1997 – 3rd place
- 1999 – 2nd place
- 2002 – 6th place
- 2006 – 1st place
- 2010 – 2nd place
- 2014 – 2nd place
- 2018 – 3rd place
- 2025 – 5th place
- 2026 – 3rd place

=== World League ===
- 2004 – 7th place
- 2005 – 3rd place
- 2006 – 4th place
- 2007 – 2nd place
- 2008 – 3rd place
- 2009 – 3rd place
- 2010 – 2nd place
- 2011 – 3rd place
- 2012 – 2nd place
- 2013 – 7th place
- 2014 – 3rd place
- 2015 – 2nd place
- 2016 – 3rd place
- 2017 – 7th place
- 2018 – 7th place
- 2019 – 5th place
- 2022 – 6th place

=== Commonwealth Championship ===
- 2002 – (gold) Gold medal
- 2006 – (gold) Gold medal

=== Holiday Cup ===
- 1998 – 1st place
- 1999 – 1st place
- 2000 – 3rd place
- 2003 – 4th place
- 2006 – 3rd place
- 2007 – 5th place

== Team ==
=== Current squad ===
Roster for the 2025 World Championships.

Head coach: Rebecca Rippon

- 1 Gabriella Palm GK
- 2 Hayley Ballesty FP
- 3 Tenealle Fasala FP
- 4 Bronte Halligan FP
- 5 Sienna Green FP
- 6 Abby Andrews FP
- 7 Charlize Andrews FP
- 8 Sienna Hearn FP
- 9 Pippa Pedley FP
- 10 Alice Williams FP
- 11 Matilda Kearns FP
- 12 Danijela Jackvoch FP
- 13 Genevieve Longman GK
- 14 Alexie Lambert FP
- 15 Olivia Mitchell FP

=== Former squads ===
- 1984 FINA World Cup – Gold medal
  - Kerri Cain, Lisa Copeland, Debbie Handley, Amanda Leeson, Jackie Northam, Katie McAdams, Wendy Meloncelli, Kerry Mills, Sandy Mills, Cathy Parkers, Janet Rayner, Julie Sheperd, and Debbie Watson.
- 1986 World Championship – Gold medal
  - Judy Gair, Debbie Handley, Amanda Leeson, Katie McAdams, Megan Meloncelli, Wendy Meloncelli, Lynne Morrison, Sandy Mills, Jackie Northam, Cathy Parkers, Janet Rayner, Julie Sheperd, and Debbie Watson.
- 1995 FINA World Cup – Gold medal
  - Naomi Castle, Loris Darvill, Kylie English, Claire Finucane, Bridgette Gusterson, Yvette Higgins, Bronwyn Mayer, Stephanie Neesham, Debbie Watson, Liz Weekes, Sharan Wheelock, Danielle Woodhouse, and Taryn Woods.
- 1998 World Championship – Bronze medal
  - Naomi Castle, Simone Dixon, Kylie English, Bridgette Gusterson, Yvette Higgins, Bronwyn Mayer, Melissa Mills, Stephanie Neesham, Marian Taylor, Liz Weekes, Sharan Wheelock, Danielle Woodhouse, and Taryn Woods.
- 2000 Summer Olympics – Gold medal
  - Naomi Castle, Joanne Fox, Bridgette Gusterson, Simone Hankin, Yvette Higgins, Kate Hooper, Bronwyn Mayer, Gail Miller, Melissa Mills, Debbie Watson, Liz Weekes, Danielle Woodhouse, and Taryn Woods. Head Coach: István Görgényi.
- 2003 World Championship – 7th place
  - Emma Knox, Rebecca Rippon, Nikita Cuffe, Naomi Castle, Bronwyn Smith, Jemma Brownlow, Jodie Stuhmcke, Kate Gynther, Elise Norwood, Taryn Woods, Melissa Rippon, Joanne Fox, and Melissa Byram. Head Coach: István Görgényi.
- 2004 Summer Olympics – 4th place
  - Belinda Brooks, Jemma Brownlow, Naomi Castle, Nikita Cuffe, Joanne Fox, Kate Gynther, Kelly Heuchan, Emma Knox, Elise Norwood, Melissa Rippon, Rebecca Rippon, Bronwyn Smith, and Jodie Stuhmcke.
- 2005 FINA World League – Bronze medal
  - Victoria Brown, Nikita Cuffe, Erin Douglass, Taniele Gofers, Kate Gynther, Fiona Hammond, Alicia McCormack (goal), Kelly Miller, Elise Norwood, Patrice O'Neill, Melissa Rippon (goal), Rebecca Rippon, and Mia Santoromito.
- 2006 FINA World League – 4th place
  - Gemma Beadsworth, Nicole Dyson, Suzie Fraser, Kate Gynther, Fiona Hammond, Bronwen Knox, Alicia McCormack (goal), Jane Moran, Patrice O'Neill, Melissa Rippon (goal), Rebecca Rippon, Mia Santoromito, and Sophie Smith. Head Coach: Greg McFadden.
- 2007 World Championship Silver medal
  - Gemma Beadsworth, Nikita Cuffe, Hadley Gemma, Taniele Gofers, Kate Gynther, Amy Hetzel, Bronwen Knox, Emma Knox, Alicia McCormack, Melissa Rippon, Rebecca Rippon, and Mia Santoromito. Head Coach: Greg McFadden.
- 2007 FINA World League – Silver medal
  - Lea Barta, Victoria Brown, Jemma Dessauvagie, Erin Douglas, Katie Finucane, Suzie Fraser, Kate Gynther, Gemma Hadley, Fiona Hammond, Jane Moran, Melissa Rippon, Mia Santoromito, and Larissa Webster. Head Coach: Greg McFadden.
- 2007 Holiday Cup – 5th place
  - Victoria Brown, Nikita Cuffe, Katie Finucane, Kate Gynther, Fiona Hammond, Bronwen Knox, Alicia McCormack, Sarah Mills, Jane Moran, Melissa Rippon, Rebecca Rippon, Jenna Santoromito, Mia Santoromito, and Sophie Smith. Head Coach: Greg McFadden.
- 2008 Summer Olympics – Bronze medal
  - Gemma Beadsworth, Nikita Cuffe, Suzie Fraser, Taniele Gofers, Kate Gynther, Amy Hetzel, Bronwen Knox, Emma Knox, Alicia McCormack, Melissa Rippon, Rebecca Rippon, Jenna Santoromito, and Mia Santoromito. Head Coach: Greg McFadden.

== Under-20 team ==
Australia's women have won two titles at the FINA Junior Water Polo World Championships.

== See also ==
- Australia women's Olympic water polo team records and statistics
- Australia men's national water polo team
- List of Olympic champions in women's water polo
- List of women's Olympic water polo tournament records and statistics
- List of world champions in women's water polo
