= Fiona Hammond =

Australian water polo player

Personal information
- Born: 10 May 1983 (age 43)
Medal record
Women's water polo
Representing Australia
FINA World Cup
Gold medal – first place	2006 Tianjin	Team competition

Fiona ("Fi") Hammond (born 10 May 1983 in Sydney) is an Australian water polo player, who joined the Women's National Team in 2006. She was a member of the side that won the gold medal at the 2006 FINA Women's Water Polo World Cup.
