= Jodie Stuhmcke =

Australian water polo player

Personal information
- Nationality: Australia
- Born: 21 November 1980 (age 45) Brisbane, Australia
- Height: 1.80 m (5 ft 11 in)
- Weight: 75 kg (165 lb)

Sport
- Sport: Water polo
- Position: centre forward

Senior clubs
- Years: Team
- ?-?: KFC Queensland Breakers
National team
- Years: Team
- ?-?: Australia

Jodie Stuhmcke (born 21 November 1980) is an Australian former water polo player. She was a member of the Australia women's national water polo team, playing as a centre forward.

She was a part of the team at the 2004 Summer Olympics. On club level she played for KFC Queensland Breakers in Australia.
