= Patrice O'Neill =

Australian water polo player

Medal record
Women's water polo
Representing Australia
FINA World Cup
Gold medal – first place	2006 Tianjin	Team competition

Patrice O'Neill is an Australian water polo player. She was a member of the side that won the gold medal at the 2006 FINA Women's Water Polo World Cup.
