= China women's national water polo team =

Women's national water polo team representing China

China
- FINA code: CHN
- Association: Chinese Swimming Association
- Confederation: AASF (Asia)
- Head coach: Miki Oca
- Captain: Shen Yineng

FINA ranking (since 2008)
- Current: 10 (as of 9 August 2021)
- Highest: 2 (2010, 2011, 2012, 2013, 2014, 2015)
- Lowest: 10 (2021)

Olympic Games (team statistics)
- Appearances: 5 (first in 2008)
- Best result: 5th (2008)

World Championship
- Appearances: 11 (first in 2005)
- Best result: (silver) (2011)

World Cup
- Appearances: 6 (first in 2006)
- Best result: (bronze) (2010)

World League
- Appearances: 12 (first in 2007)
- Best result: (gold) (2013)

Asian Games
- Appearances: 4 (first in 2010)
- Best result: (gold) (2010, 2014, 2018, 2023)

Asian Swimming Championships
- Best result: (gold) (2012, 2016)

Asian Water Polo Championship
- Best result: (gold) (2009, 2012, 2015, 2022, 2025)

Asian Cup
- Appearances: 1 (first in 2013)
- Best result: (gold) (2013)

The China women's national water polo team represents China in international women's water polo competitions and friendly matches. It is one of the leading teams in Asia.

== Results ==
=== Olympic Games ===
- 2008 – 5th place
- 2012 – 5th place
- 2016 – 7th place
- 2020 – 8th place
- 2024 – 10th place

=== World Championship ===
- 2005 – 16th place
- 2007 – 14th place
- 2009 – 11th place
- 2011 – (silver) Silver medal
- 2013 – 9th place
- 2015 – 5th place
- 2017 – 10th place
- 2019 – 11th place
- 2022 – Withdrawn
- 2023 – 13th place
- 2024 – 10th place
- 2025 – 9th place

=== World Cup ===
- 2006 – 8th place
- 2010 – (bronze) Bronze medal
- 2014 – 4th place
- 2018 – 5th place
- 2025 – 8th place
- 2026 – 8th place

=== World League ===
- 2007 – 6th place
- 2008 – 5th place
- 2009 – 5th place
- 2010 – 5th place
- 2011 – 4th place
- 2012 – 4th place
- 2013 – (gold) Gold medal
- 2014 – 4th place
- 2015 – 4th place
- 2016 – 4th place
- 2017 – 6th place
- 2018 – 6th place

=== Asian Games ===
- 2010 – Gold medal
- 2014 – Gold medal
- 2018 – Gold medal
- 2023 – Gold medal

=== Asian Swimming Championships ===
- 2012 – (gold) Gold medal
- 2016 – (gold) Gold medal

=== Asian Water Polo Championship ===
- 2009 – (gold) Gold medal
- 2012 – (gold) Gold medal
- 2015 – (gold) Gold medal
- 2022 – (gold) Gold medal
- 2025 – (gold) Gold medal

=== Asian Cup ===
- 2013 – (gold) Gold medal

== Current squad ==
Roster for the 2025 World Championships.

Head coach: Miki Oca

- 1 Du Xinyue GK
- 2 Zhang Yumian FP
- 3 Yan Jing FP
- 4 Zhou Shang FP
- 5 Zou Yuhe FP
- 6 Wang Shiyun FP
- 7 Shao Yixin FP
- 8 Wang Huan FP
- 9 Yan Siya FP
- 10 Nong Sanfeng FP
- 11 Zhang Qishuo FP
- 12 Wang Xuan FP
- 13 Shen Yineng GK
- 14 Ma Li FP
- 15 Zhang Jingwen FP

== Under-20 team ==
China's women finished as runner-up at the 2007 FINA Junior Water Polo World Championships.

== See also ==
- China women's Olympic water polo team records and statistics
- China men's national water polo team
