= Lauren Silver (water polo) =

American water polo player (born 1987)

Personal information
- Nickname: Lolo
- Born: January 28, 1987 (age 39) Long Beach, California, U.S.
- Height: 5 ft 9 in (175 cm)

Sport
- Sport: Swimming, Water Polo
- Position: Driver (WP)
- College team: Stanford University
- Coached by: John Tanner (Stanford)
Medal record
Women's water polo
Representing the United States
FINA World League
Gold medal – first place	2009 Kirishi	Team competition

Lauren "Lolo" Silver (born January 28, 1987) is an American water polo player who competed for Stanford University and won a gold medal 2009 FINA World League in Kirishi.

== Early life ==
Lauren Silver was born January 28, 1987 in Laguna Beach, California, to father Greg Silver and mother Kathy Drum. From an athletic family, her mother Kathy was part of the US Olympic women's swimming team in Montreal in 1976, and held an American record. Lauren attended Long Beach Wilson High School where she was a Moore League Conference Player of the year in three of her High School years, and made first team All-California Interscholastic Federation in three consecutive years. She competed in High School in both swimming and water polo and earned letters in all four years. She earned All-American honors in four instances, and was the second highest all-time career scorer for her High School.

== Stanford University ==
Silver attended Stanford University, competing and training with their strong women's water polo team from 2006 to 2009 under Head Coach John Tanner. Tanner, since taking over the women's team in 1998, coached them team to a top three finish at the NCAA championships every year from 2001-2026. As a freshman she was named Mountain Pacific Sports Federation Newcomer of the Year. Playing water polo for Stanford in her Senior year, she scored 52 goals, the second highest total on the women's team, despite being out ill for eight games. She was named All-Mountain Pacific Sports Federation (MPSF) for the second year as a Senior, and was voted to the All-MPSF tournament team. She scored several goals in NCAA championship play, though the team placed third.

In her Junior year in 2008, she led the women's team with 71 seasonal goals, earned honors as a first team American Collegiate Water Polo Coaches's All American, and was a Peter J. Cutino Award finalist. The Peter J. Cutino Award is given to the top collegiate water polo player of the year. As a Junior, she earned a place on the All-Tournament National Collegiate Championship Second team, and the All-tournament team for Mountain Pacific Sports.

In her Sophomore year in 2007, she was credited with 65 seasonal goals to lead the women's team. Silver was an All-American third team honoree, and an honorable mention All-Mountain Pacific Sports Federation (MPSF) honoree. The Stanford women's water polo team was a national NCAA runner up, with UCLA placing first at the championship at Long Beach State in Los Alamitos, California.

In her Freshman year in 2006, she led Stanford in scoring with a total of 52 season goals, and helped lead the team to a Mountain Pacific Sports Federation Championship where she scored seven goals. She helped bring the team to an NCAA championship third place finish where she scored five goals.

== International career ==
Silver made her senior debut with the United States women's national water polo team in 2009 winning a gold medal at 2009 FINA World League in Kirishi, Russia.
