= 2012 Pan Pacific Water Polo Championships =

The 2012 Pan Pacific Water Polo Championships, also known as the Pan Pacs, was the inaugural tournament featuring senior teams from nations along the Pacific Rim. The tournament took its inspiration from the Pan Pacific Swimming Championships as an additional major championship for nations without strong continental championships. This tournament was held at the Melbourne Sports and Aquatic Centre in Melbourne, Australia from 8–14 January 2012. USA and Australia won the men's and women's tournaments respectively.

The Pan Pacs was held in two rounds: A preliminary round where each team played all the other teams once, and a final round where the 1st and 2nd placed teams in the preliminary round play for the gold medal, 3rd and 4th for the bronze medal, and 5th and 6th for 5th place. Australia also entered a B team, named the Australia Barbarians, into both tournaments. The men's Barbarians team was not eligible to play in the final round. The women's Barbarians team could only play in the 5th-place game in the final round.

== Men's tournament ==
All times are local, AEDT (UTC+11)

=== Preliminary round ===
| | Team | G | W | D | L | GF | GA | Diff | Points |
|---|---|---|---|---|---|---|---|---|---|
| 1. | Australia | 6 | 5 | 1 | 0 | 78 | 26 | +52 | 17 |
| 2. | United States | 6 | 4 | 2 | 0 | 77 | 33 | +44 | 16 |
| | Australia Barbarians | 6 | 3 | 1 | 2 | 62 | 45 | +17 | 13 |
| 3. | China | 6 | 3 | 0 | 3 | 43 | 59 | -16 | 12 |
| 4. | Brazil | 6 | 2 | 1 | 3 | 61 | 72 | -11 | 11 |
| 5. | Japan | 6 | 1 | 1 | 4 | 50 | 61 | −11 | 9 |
| 6. | New Zealand | 6 | 0 | 0 | 6 | 23 | 98 | −75 | 6 |

points: win = 3; draw = 2; loss = 1

=== Final round ===
5th-place game

| 14 January 2012; 09:30 | Japan | 19–4 | New Zealand |

Bronze-medal game

| 14 January 2012; 11:00 | China | 11–7 | Brazil |

Gold-medal game

| 14 January 2012; 15:45 | Australia | 10–11 (ET) | United States |

=== Final ranking ===
| RANK | TEAM |
|---|---|
| | United States |
| | Australia |
| | China |
| 4. | Brazil |
| 5. | Japan |
| 6. | New Zealand |

== Women's tournament ==
All times are local, AEDT (UTC+11)

=== Preliminary round ===
| | Team | G | W | D | L | GF | GA | Diff | Points |
|---|---|---|---|---|---|---|---|---|---|
| 1. | Australia | 5 | 5 | 0 | 0 | 51 | 26 | +25 | 15 |
| 2. | United States | 5 | 4 | 0 | 1 | 55 | 26 | +29 | 13 |
| 3. | China | 5 | 2 | 1 | 2 | 45 | 34 | +11 | 10 |
| 4. | Canada | 5 | 2 | 1 | 2 | 48 | 32 | +16 | 12 |
| | Australia Barbarians | 5 | 1 | 0 | 4 | 27 | 41 | -14 | 7 |
| 5. | Brazil | 5 | 0 | 0 | 5 | 16 | 83 | −67 | 5 |

points: win = 3; draw = 2; loss = 1

=== Final round ===
5th-place game

| 14 January 2012; 08:00 | Australia Barbarians | 13–8 | Brazil |

Bronze-medal game

| 14 January 2012; 12:45 | China | 6–10 | Canada |

Gold-medal game

| 14 January 2012; 14:15 | Australia | 7–4 | United States |

=== Final ranking ===
| RANK | TEAM |
|---|---|
| | Australia |
| | United States |
| | Canada |
| 4. | China |
| 5. | Brazil |
