= 2008 FINA Women's Water Polo World League =

- League: FINA Water Polo World League
- Sport: Water Polo

FINA Women's Water Polo World League seasons
- ← 2007 2009 →

The 2008 FINA Women's Water Polo World League was the fifth edition of the event, organised by the world's governing body in aquatics, the FINA. After three preliminary rounds, the Super Final was held in Santa Cruz del Tenerife, Spain from June 10 to June 15, 2008.

== Preliminary round ==
=== Americas ===
Canada and United States qualified without qualification tournament.

=== Asia/Oceania ===
- Held in Tianjin, China

	Team	Pts	G	W	L
1	Australia	10	4	4	0
2	China	8	4	2	2
3	Japan	0	4	0	4

May 20

China	23 – 5	Japan

May 21

China	9 – 11 (p)	Australia

May 22

Japan	4 – 17	Australia

May 23

China	21 – 4	Japan

May 24

China	10 – 11 (p)	Australia

May 25

Japan	3 – 19	Australia

=== Europe ===
- Held in Siracusa, Italy and Athens, Greece.

	Team	Pts	G	W	L
1	Russia	18	6	6	0
2	Greece	12	6	4	2
3	Spain	4	6	1	5
4	Italy	2	6	1	5

- Spain qualified as the hosting nation of the Super Final

May 23

Russia	8 – 7	Greece
Italy	15 – 13 (p)	Spain

May 24

Spain	8 – 11	Russia
Greece	9 – 8	Italy

May 25

Greece	11 – 6	Spain
Italy	6 – 13	Russia

May 30

Italy	7 – 10	Spain
Greece	6 – 14	Russia

May 31

Greece	10 – 8	Italy
Russia	19 – 10	Spain

June 1

Italy	8 – 16	Russia
Greece	13 – 8	Spain

== Super Final ==
- Held in Santa Cruz de Tenerife, Spain

=== Preliminary ===
	Team	Pts	G	W	L
1	United States	15	5	5	0
2	Russia	10	5	3	2
3	Australia	8	5	3	2
4	Canada	6	5	2	3
5	Spain	5	5	2	3
6	China	1	5	0	5

June 10

Australia	9 – 10	United States
Canada	7 – 15	Russia
Spain	10 – 9 (p)	China

June 11

United States	10 – 6	Russia
Australia	10 – 8	China
Spain	12 – 10	Canada

June 12

Canada	7 – 6	Australia
China	8 – 12	United States
Spain	9 – 15	Russia

June 13

Canada	5 – 6	United States
China	8 – 10	Russia
Spain	7 – 11	Australia

June 14

China	5 – 8	Canada
Russia	13 – 14 (p)	Australia
Spain	9 – 11	United States

=== 5th place match ===
June 15

Spain	5 – 7	China

=== Bronze medal match ===
June 15

Australia	7 – 6	Canada

=== Gold medal match ===
June 15

United States	7 – 8	Russia

=== Final ranking ===
Rank	Team
Gold medal	Russia
Silver medal	United States
Bronze medal	Australia
4	Canada
5	China
6	Spain

2008 FINA Women's Water Polo World League

Russia
First title
