= Taniele Gofers =

Australian water polo player

Personal information
- Born: 12 June 1985 (age 41) Sydney, Australia

Sport
- Sport: Water polo
- Club: Sydney Uni Water Polo Club
Medal record
Representing Australia
Olympic Games
Bronze medal – third place	2008 Beijing	Team competition
World Championships
Silver medal – second place	2007 Melbourne	Team competition

Taniele Gofers (born 12 June 1985) is an Australian water polo player. She was a member of the Australia women's national water polo team that won a bronze medal at the 2008 Beijing Olympics.

Prior to winning bronze at the 2008 Beijing Olympics, she won a gold medal at the FINA Women's Water Polo World Cup in 2006 as well as a silver medal at the FINA World Aquatics Championships in 2007.

Gofers was ranked 57th in the 2013 book "Greatest Water Polo Players to Ever Play the Game: Top 100" by Alex Trost & Vadim Kravetsky.

Gofers has an accomplished second career as a key member of the United Nations Office for Project Services (UNOPS) in Myanmar where she manages the Fund Directors Office and Communications playing a key role for the Access to Health Fund. Previously, she also worked as the communications officer at the Three Millennium Development Goal Fund.

== Personal life ==
Taniele Gofers is the sister of Australian water polo player Keesja Gofers and Australian handball player Allira Hudson-Gofers.

== See also ==
- List of Olympic medalists in water polo (women)
- List of World Aquatics Championships medalists in water polo
