= Nikita Cuffe =

Australian water polo player

Personal information
- Born: 26 September 1979 (age 46) Brisbane, Australia

Sport
- Sport: Water polo
- Club: Queensland Thunder
Medal record
Representing Australia
Olympic Games
Bronze medal – third place	2008 Beijing	Team competition
World Championships
Silver medal – second place	2007 Melbourne	Team competition

Nikita Cuffe (born 26 September 1979) is an Australian water polo player. She was a member of the Australia women's national water polo team that won a bronze medal at the 2008 Summer Olympics.

== See also ==
- List of Olympic medalists in water polo (women)
- List of World Aquatics Championships medalists in water polo
