= Melissa Rippon =

Australian water polo player

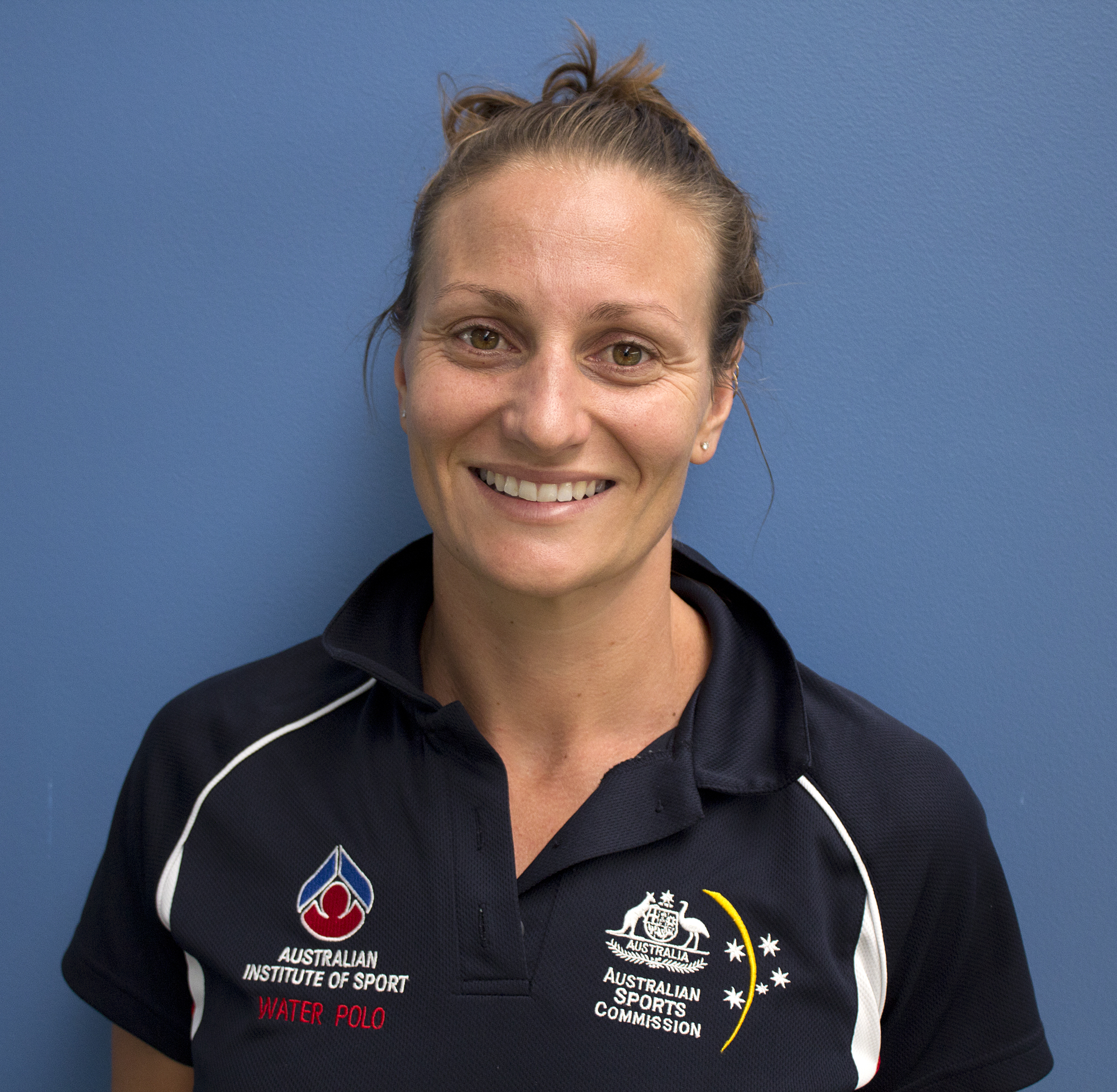

Personal information
- Full name: Melissa Alison Rippon
- Nationality: Australian
- Born: 20 January 1981 (age 45)
- Height: 169 cm (5 ft 7 in) (2008)
- Weight: 70 kg (154 lb) (2008)

Sport
- Country: Australia
- Sport: Water polo
- Event: Women's team
Medal record
Women's water polo
Representing Australia
Olympic Games
Bronze medal – third place	2008 Beijing	Team competition
Bronze medal – third place	2012 London	Team competition
FINA Women's Water Polo World Cup
Silver medal – second place	2010 Christchurch	Team competition

Melissa Alison Rippon (born 20 January 1981) is an Australian former water polo player. She played for the Brisbane Barracudas who compete in the National Water Polo League. She represented Australia in water polo at the 2004 Summer Olympics, 2008 Summer Olympics and at the 2012 Summer Olympics winning bronze medals at both of the latter two. She has earned a bronze medal at the 2010 FINA Women's Water Polo World Cup.

== Personal life ==
Rippon was born on 20 January 1981 in Sydney, New South Wales, Australia. She is 169 cm (5 ft 7 in) and weighs 70 kilograms (150 lb). She has a sister, Rebecca Rippon, and a step-sister, Kate Gynther, who also represented Australia in water polo. Her mother died in 2000 as a result of breast cancer. She was able to spend additional time with her mother because she did not compete at the 2000 Summer Olympics as a result of an injury. Her father remarried in 2002, which is when Gynther became her step-sister. She and Gynther became inseparable and have remained that way since their parents became married. As a member of the junior national team, she sat in the front row with her father and watched Australia win the first women's gold medal in water polo at the 2000 Summer Olympics. In 2002, she moved to Brisbane. Her father moved to the area in 2003 and she and Gynther lived with their parents in Oxley, Queensland.

== Water polo ==
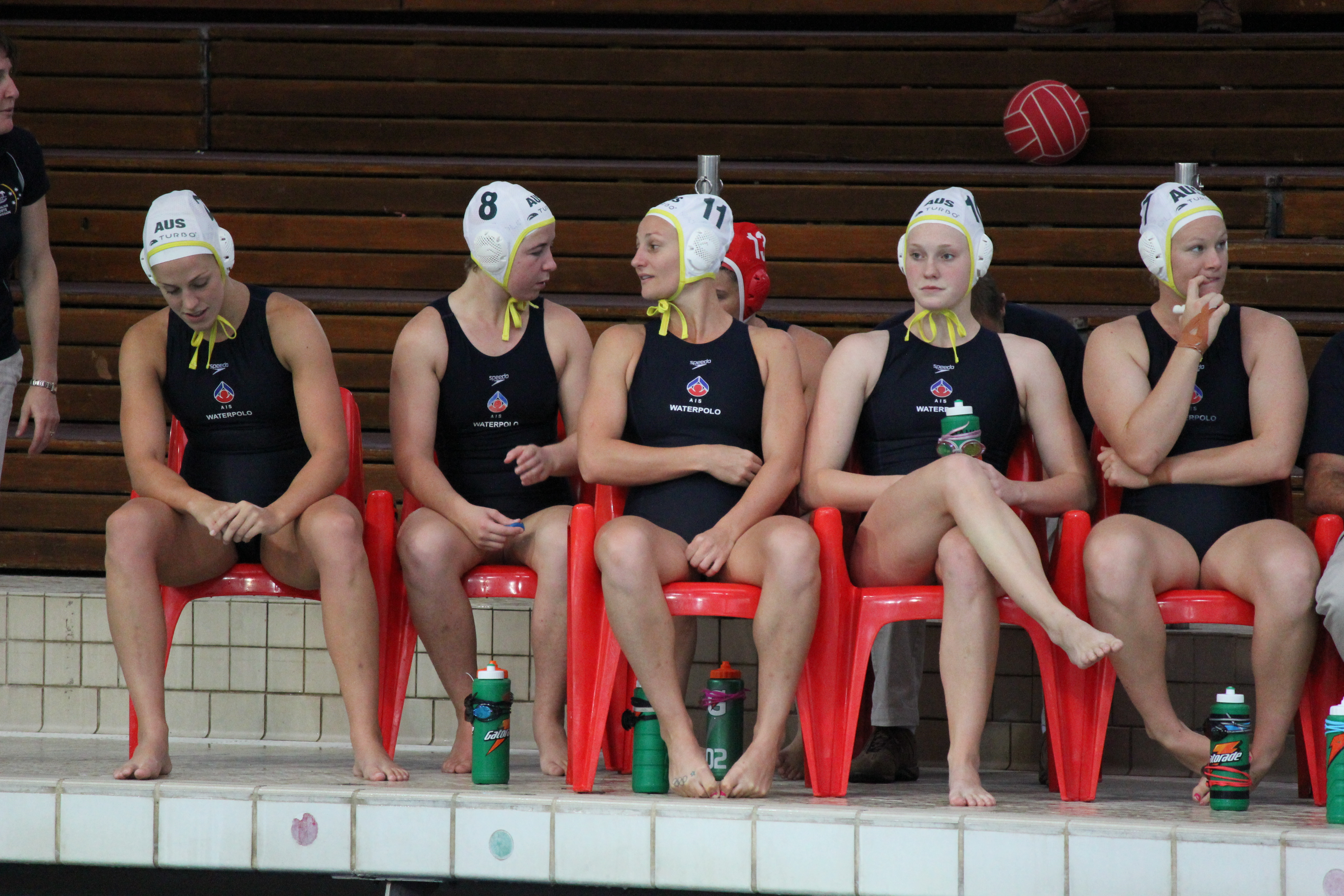
The third of a five-game test series against the Great Britain women's national water polo team on 25 February 2012. Australia won 15–6. On the far left is Bronwen Knox, then Zoe Arancini, Melissa Rippon, Rowena Webster, Hannah Buckling.

Rippon started playing water polo because her sister played the sport, and had a scholarship with the Queensland Academy of Sport in 2002. In 2006, she had an injury that mean she was unable to compete internationally for a while. In 2017 Melissa was awarded the inaugural Inclusive Coach Award from ACON Pride in Sport / Pride in Diversity Australia for her involvement with the Brisbane Tritons, Queensland's first LGBTIQ and Inclusive Water Polo club. This award was shared with fellow coach and Brisbane Barracudas senior player Damien Hicks

=== Club water polo ===
Rippon plays club water polo for the Brisbane Barracudas who compete in the National Water Polo League. She was with the team in 2008 and 2011. The annual match between Breakers and Barracudas is one the Courier Mail considers a grudge match. She participated in the 2008 edition with her team. She was with the team for the 2012 season. In 2000, she injured her wrist and this injury made it impossible for her to make the national squad that competed at the 2000 Summer Olympics, In 2008, she competed in the Women's International Series. though she was a member of the training squad.

=== Olympics ===
Rippon was a member of the Australia women's national water polo team that finished fourth at the 2004 Summer Olympics. She was a member of the Australia women's national water polo team that won a bronze medal at the 2008 Beijing Olympics. Her team ended up in the bronze medal match after losing 8–9 to the United States in the semi-finals and playing against Hungary for the bronze. Earlier in the Olympics, her team had tied the Hungarians. She survived the first cut for the national team that would compete at the 2012 Summer Olympics, and was chosen as a member of the Olympic training team. The team of seventeen players will be cut to thirteen before the team departs for the Olympic games, with the announcement being made on 13 June. Prior to Rebecca Rippon being cut from the 2012 Olympic squad, sisters Kate Gynther, Melissa Rippon and Rebecca Rippon had hoped to become the first set of Australian siblings to all compete at three consecutive Olympic Games.

=== Other national team appearances ===
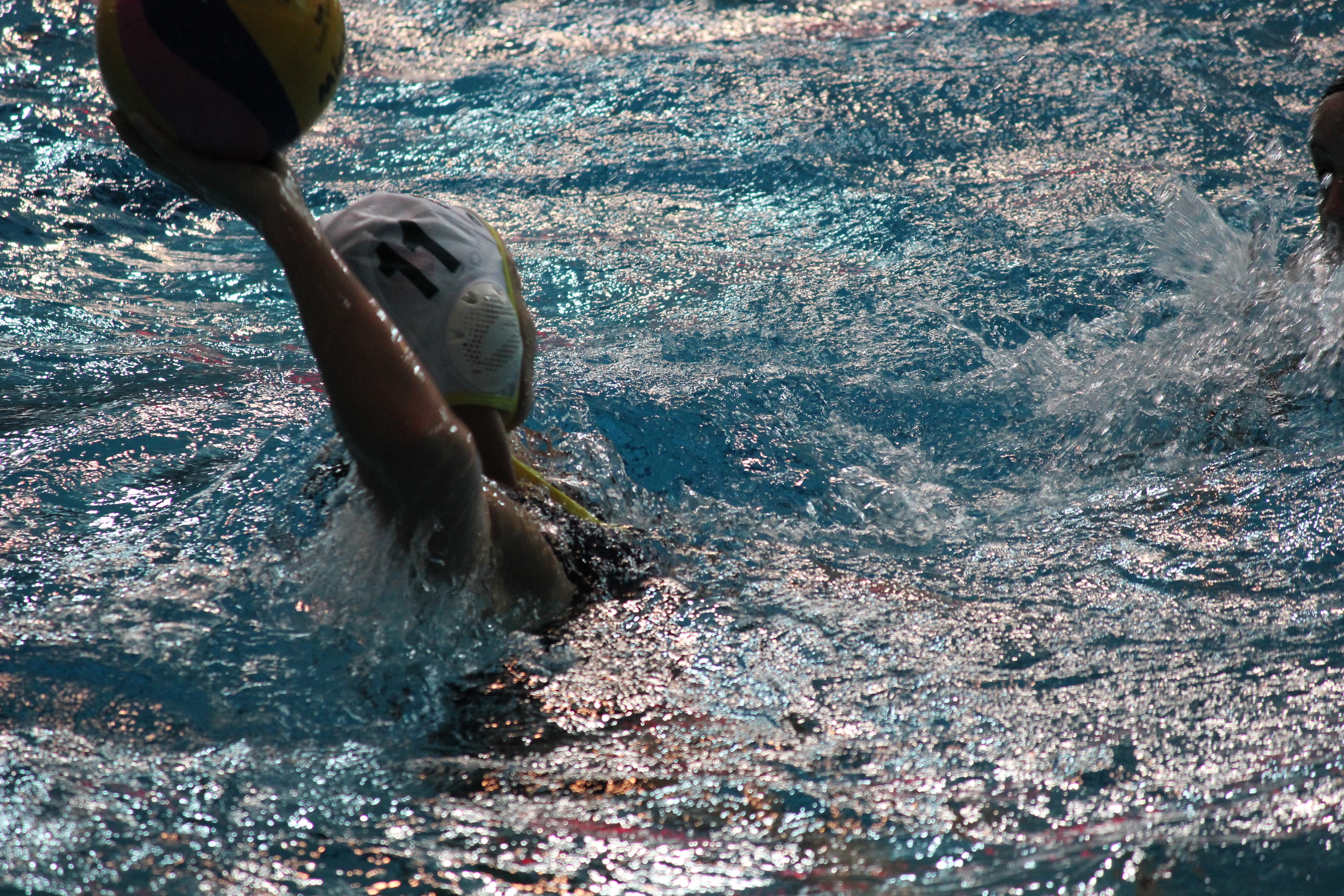
Rippon passes the ball during the fifth and final test match against Great Britain

Rippon represented Australia at the 2005 World Championships held in Canada. She scored a goal in Australia's 9–2 semi-final win over the Netherlands. In 2005, she was part of the side that won a bronze medal at the FINA World League Super Finals in Kirishi, Russia. She was a member of the Australian side that finished first at the 2006 FINA Water Polo World Cup. That year, she also won a gold medal at the 2006 Commonwealth Games. In 2007, she was the team captain going into an Olympic year. In 2007, she was a member of the Australian side that finished second at the FINA Water Polo World Championships where she was the team's captain. She played in the December 2007 series against New Zealand where Australian won the first two tests 18–1 and 17–1. In the second match in series, she was kicked by an opposing player and sat out the third game of the series. She was part of Australia's Oceania Olympic qualification campaign in 2008. In an 18–1 victory over New Zealand during the qualifiers, she scored a goal. She competed in a 13 August 2008 7–7 draw against Hungary. With sixteen seconds left in the game, she was excluded from further participation. At the time she left, Australia was ahead but Hungary went on to tie the match. She was named to the team that competed in 2008 at the FINA world league preliminary round in Tianjin, China. In a 2008 Asia-Oceania qualifier against China for the World League Super Finals, she played in the 11–9 win that went to a penalty shoot out. In the match, she scored a goal for Australia. In 2009, she was the team captain. In August 2010, Rippon competed for the national team at the 10th Anniversary Tournament at Sydney Olympic Park. In the preliminaries, she competed in the team's 10–8 win over the United States. She scored the go-ahead goal. The game was her 212th for the senior squad. In 2010, she was a member of the Stingers squad that competed at the FINA World Cup in Christchurch, New Zealand. In the team's finals 10–8 victory over the United States, she scored a goal. In April 2011, she attended a training camp at the Australian Institute of Sport where the coach was "selecting a team for the major championships over winter." In 2011, she was one of five Queensland women to compete for the Australian Stingers in the FINA World League competition held in Auckland, New Zealand. In July 2011, she was a member of the Australian Stingers that competed in the 2011 FINA World Championships in Shanghai as a field player. In preparation for this tournament, she attended a team training camp in Perth, Western Australia. She competed in the Pan Pacific Championships in January 2012 for the Australian Stingers. She was part of the Stingers squad that competed in a five-game test against Great Britain at the AIS in late February 2012. This was the team's first matches against Great Britain's national team in six years. In the first game of the test series on 21 February 2012 that Australia won 13 – 5, she scored one goal. She represented Australia at the 2012 Olympics winning a bronze medal.

== See also ==
- Australia women's Olympic water polo team records and statistics
- List of Olympic medalists in water polo (women)
- List of players who have appeared in multiple women's Olympic water polo tournaments
- List of World Aquatics Championships medalists in water polo
