= Kate Gynther =

Australian water polo player

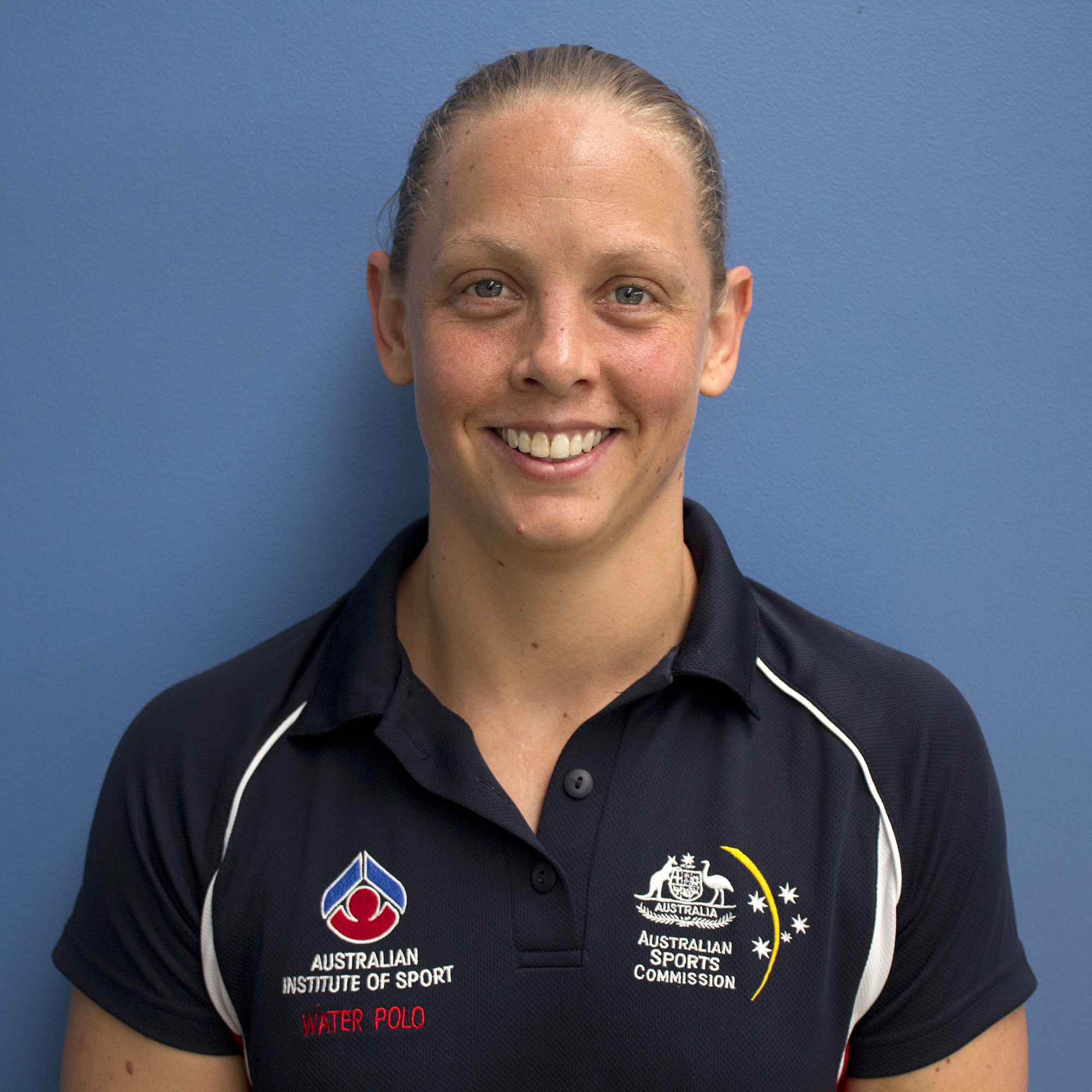

Personal information
- Full name: Kate Maree Gynther
- Born: 5 July 1982 (age 44)
- Height: 1.75 m (5 ft 9 in) (2012)
- Weight: 73 kg (2012)

Sport
- Sport: Water polo
- Event: Women's team
- Club: Brisbane Barracudas
Medal record
Women's water polo
Representing Australia
Olympic Games
Bronze medal – third place	2008 Beijing	Team competition
Bronze medal – third place	2012 London	Team competition
FINA World League Super Finals
Bronze medal – third place	2005 Kirishi	Team competition

Kate Maree Gynther (born 5 July 1982) is an Australian former water polo player. She played for the Brisbane Barracudas in the National Water Polo League. She represented Australia as a member of the women's senior national team at the 2004 Summer Olympics, the 2008 Summer Olympics and the 2012 Summer Olympics, winning a bronze medal at the 2008 and 2012 Games. She is a leading goalscorer in Olympic water polo history, with 30 goals. She was the joint top sprinter at the 2012 Olympics with 21 sprints won; and a leading sprinter in Olympic water polo history, with 39 sprints won. She has also won a bronze medal at the 2005 Super League Finals.

== Personal life ==
Gynther was born in July 1982 in Brisbane, Queensland. Her step-sisters are Rebecca Rippon and Melissa Rippon, both of whom have played for the Australian women's national water polo team. Her mother married in 2002, which is when the Rippon sisters became her step-sisters. Melissa and Gynther became inseparable and have remained that way since their parents became married.

She is also a Detective Sergeant with the Queensland Police Service.

== Water polo ==
Gynther has a water polo scholarship from the Australian Institute of Sport.

=== Club team ===
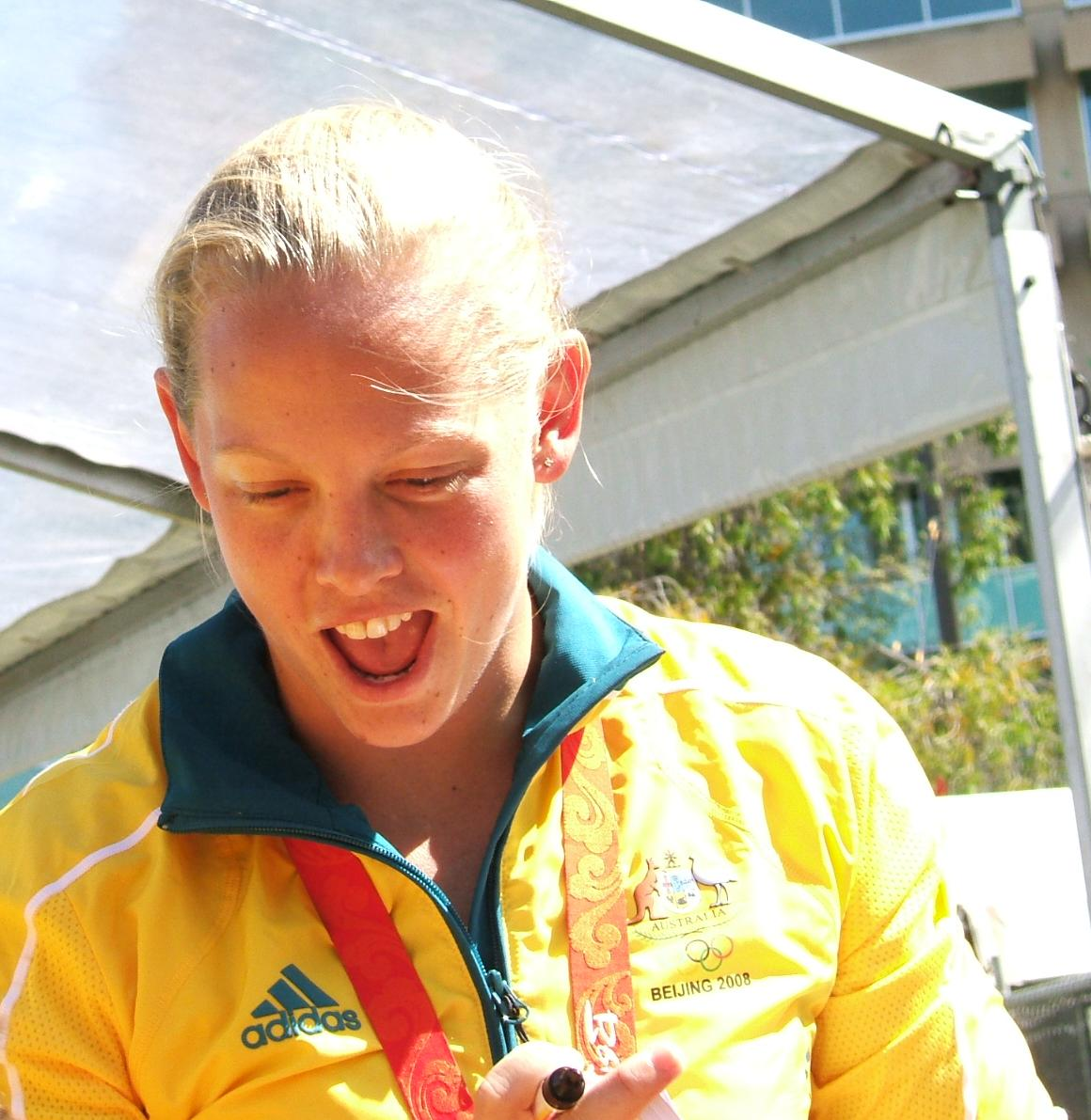
Kate Gynther

Gynther played club water polo for the Brisbane Barracudas who compete in the National Water Polo League. She was with the team in 2008. The annual match between Breakers and Barracudas is considered is one the Courier Mail considers a grudge match. She participated in the 2008 edition with her team. She was with the team for the 2011 and 2012 seasons. She was a member of the team in 2011 when they won the league championship for the third year in a row. She played for the championship match with the score 4–4 at the end of regular time, 1–1 at the end of over time and finally going to a shootout. She was named the "female player of the finals series".

=== National team ===
She is introduced along with other players on the national team before the first game in the Australia versus Great Britain test.

Gynther competed at the 2004 Summer Olympics and the 2008 Summer Olympics. She represented Australia at the 2005 World Championships held in Canada. She scored a goal in Australia's 9-2 semi-final win over the Netherlands. In 2005, she was part of the side that won a bronze medal at the FINA World League Super Finals in Kirishi, Russia. She was part of Australia's Oceania Olympic qualification campaign in 2008. In an 18–1 victory over New Zealand during the qualifiers, she scored a goal. She was named to the team that competed in 2008 at the FINA world league preliminary round in Tianjin, China. In a 2008 Asia-Oceania qualifier against China for the World League Super Finals, she played in the 11–9 win that went to a penalty shoot out. In the match, she scored a pair of goals for Australia. She was a member of the Australia women's national water polo team that won a bronze medal at the 2008 Beijing Olympics. Her team ended up in the bronze medal match after losing 8–9 to the United States in the semi-finals and playing against Hungary for the bronze. Earlier in the Olympics, her team had tied the Hungarians. In April 2011, she attended a training camp at the Australian Institute of Sport where the coach was "selecting a team for the major championships over winter." In 2011, she was one of five Queensland women to compete for the Australian Stingers in the FINA World League competition held in Auckland, New Zealand. In July 2011, she was a member of the Australian Stingers that competed in the 2011 FINA World Championships in Shanghai as a field player. In preparation for this tournament, she attended a team training camp in Perth, Western Australia. She competed in the Pan Pacific Championships in January 2012 for the Australian Stingers. She scored a goal in a Stingers 8–7 win over the United States. In February 2012, she was named to the final training squad for the 2012 Summer Olympics. She attended training camp that started on 20 February 2012 at the Australian Institute of Sport. The team of seventeen players will be cut to thirteen before the team departs for the Olympic games, with the announcement being made on 13 June. She was part of the Stingers squad that competed in a five-game test against Great Britain at the AIS in late February 2012. This was the team's first matches against Great Britain's national team in six years.

Prior to Rebecca Rippon being cut from the 2012 Olympic squad, sisters Kate Gynther, Melissa Rippon and Rebecca Rippon had hoped to become the first set of Australian siblings to all compete at three consecutive Olympic Games.

== See also ==
- Australia women's Olympic water polo team records and statistics
- List of Olympic medalists in water polo (women)
- List of players who have appeared in multiple women's Olympic water polo tournaments
- List of women's Olympic water polo tournament top goalscorers
- List of World Aquatics Championships medalists in water polo
