= Elizabeth Armstrong (water polo) =

American water polo player (born 1983)

Personal information
- Full name: Elizabeth Anne Armstrong
- Nickname: Betsey
- Born: January 31, 1983 (age 43) Ann Arbor, Michigan, U.S.
- Height: 6 ft 2 in (1.87 m)
- Weight: 170 lb (77 kg)

Sport
- Sport: Water polo
- Handedness: right
- Position: goalkeeper
- College team: University of Michigan
- Number: 1
National team
- Years: Team
- 2011: United States
Medal record
Women's water polo
Representing the United States
Olympic Games
Gold medal – first place	2012 London	Team competition
Silver medal – second place	2008 Beijing	Team competition
World Championships
Gold medal – first place	2007 Melbourne	Team competition
Gold medal – first place	2009 Rome	Team competition
FINA Water Polo World League
Gold medal – first place	2006 Cosenza	Team competition
Gold medal – first place	2007 Montreal	Team competition
Pan American Games
Gold medal – first place	2007 Rio de Janeiro	Team competition
Gold medal – first place	2011 Guadalajara	Team competition

Elizabeth Anne "Betsey" Armstrong (born January 31, 1983) is an American water polo goalkeeper, who won gold medals with the United States women's national water polo team at the 2012 Summer Olympics, 2007 and 2011 Pan American Games, and 2007 and 2009 world championships. She is a leading goalkeeper in Olympic water polo history, with 102 saves. Armstrong attended Huron High School in Ann Arbor and was a three-year letterwinner on her water polo team. She then went on to graduate from the University of Michigan in 2005, where she was the goalkeeper for the women's water polo team. Betsey graduated with a bachelor's degree in English language and Literature. She is currently the record holder at University of Michigan with 350 saves.

Armstrong made her debut for the national team in 2006. At the Beijing 2008 Summer Olympics, they lost 8–9 in the championship game to the Netherlands and took home the silver medal. She was the top goalkeeper at the 2008 Olympics, with 49 saves.

In June 2009, Armstrong was named to the USA water polo women's senior national team for the 2009 FINA World Championships. She was named the best female water polo player for 2010 by FINA Aquatics World Magazine.

Starting in 2012, Betsey was hired as the assistant coach of the University of Michigan Women's Water Polo Team. She works alongside head coach Matt Anderson in coaching the players.

In 2019, she was inducted into the USA Water Polo Hall of Fame.

== International competitions ==
- 2000 — Junior Pan American Games, Barquisimeto, Venezuela, 1st place
- 2006 — FINA World League, Cosenza, Italy, 1st place
- 2006 — FINA World Cup, Tianjin, China, 4th place
- 2006 — Holiday Cup, Los Alamitos, United States, 1st place
- 2007 — FINA World Championships, Melbourne, Australia, 1st place
- 2007 — FINA World League, Montréal, Canada, 1st place
- 2007 — Pan American Games, Rio de Janeiro, Brazil, 1st place
- 2008 — Summer Olympic Games, Beijing, China, silver medal
- 2011 — Pan American Games, gold medal
- 2012 — Summer Olympic Games, London, gold medal

== See also ==
- United States women's Olympic water polo team records and statistics
- List of Olympic champions in women's water polo
- List of Olympic medalists in water polo (women)
- List of women's Olympic water polo tournament goalkeepers
- List of world champions in women's water polo
- List of World Aquatics Championships medalists in water polo

Awards
Preceded by First award	FINA Water Polo Player of the Year	Succeeded by (Greece) Alexandra Asimaki
