= Water polo at the 2007 World Aquatics Championships =

The water polo events at the 2007 World Aquatics Championships were held from 19 March to 1 April 2007, in Melbourne, Australia.

== Medal summary ==
=== Medal table ===
Rank	Nation	Gold	Silver	Bronze	Total
1	Croatia (CRO)	1	0	0	1
1	United States (USA)	1	0	0	1
3	Australia (AUS)	0	1	0	1
3	Hungary (HUN)	0	1	0	1
5	Russia (RUS)	0	0	1	1
5	Spain (ESP)	0	0	1	1
Totals (6 entries)		2	2	2	6

=== Medalists ===
Event	Gold	Silver	Bronze
Men	Croatia Samir Barač; Miho Bošković; Damir Burić; Andro Bušlje; Teo Đogaš; Igor Hinić; Maro Joković; Aljoša Kunac; Pavo Marković; Josip Pavić; Mile Smodlaka; Frano Vićan; Zdeslav Vrdoljak Head coach Ratko Rudić	Hungary Tibor Benedek; Péter Biros; Rajmund Fodor; Tamás Kásás; Gábor Kis; Gergely Kiss; Norbert Madaras; Tamás Molnár; Viktor Nagy; Zoltán Szécsi; Márton Szivós; Dániel Varga; Dénes Varga Head coach Dénes Kemény	Spain Iñaki Aguilar; Ángel Andreo; Iván Gallego; Mario García; Xavier García; David Martín; Marc Minguell; Guillermo Molina; Iván Pérez; Felipe Perrone; Ricardo Perrone; Svilen Piralkov; Xavier Vallès Head coach Rafael Aguilar
Women	United States Elizabeth Armstrong; Patricia Cardenas; Kameryn Craig; Natalie Golda; Alison Gregorka; Brittany Hayes; Jaime Hipp; Ericka Lorenz; Heather Petri; Moriah van Norman; Brenda Villa; Lauren Wenger; Elsie Windes Head coach Guy Baker	Australia Gemma Beadsworth; Nikita Cuffe; Suzie Fraser; Taniele Gofers; Kate Gynther; Gemma Hadley; Amy Hetzel; Bronwen Knox; Emma Knox; Alicia McCormack; Melissa Rippon; Rebecca Rippon; Mia Santoromito Head coach Greg McFadden	Russia Valentina Vorontsova; Natalya Shepelina; Ekaterina Zubacheva; Sofya Konukh; Alena Vylegzhanina; Nadezda Glyzina; Ekaterina Pantyulina; Evgenia Soboleva; Natalya Ryzhova-Alenicheva; Olga Fomicheva; Elena Smurova; Anastasia Zubkova; Maria Kovtunovskaya Head coach Alexander Kleymenov
