= 2008 Women's European Water Polo Championship =

Tournament details
- Host country: Spain
- Venue: 1 (in 1 host city)
- Dates: 5 – 12 July
- Teams: 8 (from 1 confederation)

Final positions
- Champions: Russia (2nd title)
- Runners-up: Spain
- Third place: Hungary
- Fourth place: Netherlands

Tournament statistics
- Top scorer: Ekaterina Pantyulina (RUS) (16)

Awards
- Best player: Blanca Gil (ESP)

The 2008 Women's European Water Polo Championship was the twelfth edition of the bi-annual event, organised by the Europe's governing body in aquatics, the Ligue Européenne de Natation. The event took place in the Aquatic Centre Málaga in Málaga, Spain from July 5 to July 12, 2008.

== Teams ==
Group A

- Netherlands
- Spain
- Russia
- Germany

Group B

- Italy
- Greece
- France
- Hungary

== Preliminary round ==
=== Group A ===
	Team	Points	G	W	D	L	GF	GA	Diff
1.	Spain	7	3	2	1	0	33	26	+7
2.	Russia	6	3	2	0	1	33	26	+7
3.	Netherlands	4	3	1	1	1	26	24	+2
4.	Germany	0	3	0	0	3	22	38	−16

July 5, 2008

13:30	Spain	10 – 9	Russia	(2–3, 4–1, 1–3, 3–2)
15:00	Netherlands	9 – 6	Germany	(3–0, 2–3, 2–2, 2–1)

July 6, 2008

13:30	Netherlands	10–10	Spain	(5–3, 1–3, 2–3, 2–1)
15:00	Germany	9 – 16	Russia	(0–3, 4–6, 4–2, 1–5)

July 7, 2008

12:00	Netherlands	7 – 8	Russia	(2–3, 2–1, 2–2, 1–2)
13:30	Spain	13 – 7	Germany	(2–4, 4–1, 3–0, 4–2)

=== Group B ===
	Team	Points	G	W	D	L	GF	GA	Diff
1.	Italy	7	3	2	1	0	32	16	+16
2.	Hungary	5	3	1	2	0	21	16	+5
3.	Greece	4	3	1	1	1	31	19	+12
4.	France	0	3	0	0	3	10	43	−33

July 5, 2008

12:00	Italy	4–4	Hungary	(0–2, 1–1, 1–1, 2–0)
16:30	Greece	15 – 2	France	(2–0, 5–0, 3–1, 5–1)

July 6, 2008

12:00	Italy	10 – 9	Greece	(3–4, 1–1, 4–1, 2–3)
16:30	Hungary	10 – 5	France	(3–1, 3–1, 2–3, 2–0)

July 7, 2008

15:00	France	3 – 18	Italy	(0–6, 0–6, 2–4, 1–2)
16:30	Greece	7–7	Hungary	(2–0, 1–1, 3–4, 1–2)

== Quarterfinals ==
July 8, 2008

13:30	Russia	9 – 7	Greece	(2–1, 1–2, 3–1, 3–3)
15:00	Netherlands	7 – 9	Hungary	(1–1, 2–4, 2–3, 2–1)

== Semifinals ==
July 10, 2008

19:30	Hungary	7 – 8	Spain	(2–0, 2–2, 2–2, 1–4)
21:00	Russia	8 – 5	Italy	(2–0, 0–0, 4–3, 2–2)

== Finals ==
=== 7 / 8 places ===
July 8, 2008

12:00	Germany	8 – 6	France	(2–2, 5–0, 1–3, 0–1)

=== 5 / 6 places ===
July 10, 2008

18:00	Greece	10 – 11	Netherlands	(3–3, 4–2, 1–3, 2–3)

=== Bronze Medal ===
July 12, 2008

19:30	Hungary	9 – 6	Italy	(1–2, 2–2, 2–1, 4–1)

=== Gold Medal ===
July 12, 2008

21:00	Spain	8 – 9	Russia	(2–3, 1–3, 3–2, 2–1)

== Final ranking ==
RANK	TEAM
	Russia
	Spain
	Hungary
4.	Italy
5.	Netherlands
6.	Greece
7.	Germany
8.	France

2008 Women's European champion

Russia
Second title

Valentina Vorontsova, Natalia Shepelina, Ekaterina Prokofyeva, Sofia Konoukh, Alena Vylegzhanina, Nadezda Glyzina, Ekaterina Pantyulina, Evgenia Soboleva, Oleksandra Karpovich, Olga Belyaeva, Elena Smurova, Olga Turova, Evgeniya Protsenko
Head coach: Alexander Kleymenov.

== Individual awards ==
- Most Valuable Player
  - Blanca Gil (ESP)
- Best Goalkeeper
- Topscorer
  - Ekaterina Pantyulina (RUS) (16)
