= Russia women's national water polo team =

Women's national water polo team representing Russia

Russia
- FINA code: RUS
- Association: Russian Water Polo Federation
- Confederation: LEN (Europe)
- Head coach: Alexander Gaidukov
- Asst coach: Andrey Belofastov
- Captain: Ekaterina Prokofyeva

FINA ranking (since 2008)
- Current: 4 (as of 9 August 2021)
- Highest: 2 (2017, 2018, 2019)
- Lowest: 7 (2008)

Olympic Games (team statistics)
- Appearances: 5 (first in 2000)
- Best result: (bronze) (2000, 2016)

World Championship
- Appearances: 12 (first in 1994)
- Best result: (bronze) (2003, 2007, 2009, 2011, 2017)

World Cup
- Appearances: 9 (first in 1995)
- Best result: (silver) (1997)

World League
- Appearances: 15 (first in 2004)
- Best result: (gold) (2008)

European Championship
- Appearances: 14 (first in 1993)
- Best result: (gold) (2006, 2008, 2010)

Media
- Website: waterpolo.ru

Russia women's national water polo team
Medal record

Representing Russia

Summer Universiade
Gold medal – first place	2013 Kazan	
Bronze medal – third place	2009 Belgrade	
Bronze medal – third place	2011 Shenzhen	
Bronze medal – third place	2015 Gwangju	
Bronze medal – third place	2019 Naples	

European Games
Gold medal – first place	2015 Baku	Team

The Russia women's national water polo team represents Russia in international women's water polo competitions and friendly matches.

== History ==
=== In the Russian Empire ===
Water polo in Russia dates back to 1910, when the sport was included into the national water sports programme. The Shuvalov school was opened back then, featuring rules that differed from the international rules. In 1913, the first water polo tournament was played between the Shuvalov school and Moscow, with the first winning 3–2. The new sport progressed in Russia, as all swimming organizations included this sport into their programme. P. Erofeev and A. Shemansky further populized water polo by publishing brochures with rules and hints.

=== In the Soviet Union ===
As previously, water polo was predominant in Moscow and Leningrad (formerly known as St. Petersburg). However, this changed when the water polo teams of the Black Sea Fleet, Baltic Fleet and Caspian Flotilla further spread water polo in Russia. In the early history, water polo was popular especially among sailors. The strongest teams were Delfin of Leningrad and the Moscow Life Saving Society and the Yacht-Club. Following the resolution by the organizing bureau of the Central Committee of the Communist Party of the Soviet Union in 1925, physical culture has been greatly propagated in Russia, stimulating water polo as well.

The first championship took place in 1925. Apart from the teams of Leningrad, Moscow and Kyiv, the tournament featured teams from the Caucasus, Crimea, Ural, as well as the aforementioned fleet teams. Three years later, water polo was included in the All-Union Spartakiade (sports festival). The team of Leningrad dominated in Russian water polo until 1933, as the city had winter water pools and so had more training opportunities. In 1946, the USSR Water Polo Cup was introduced. One year later, the Soviet Union was selected into the FINA. The national water polo then debuted at the 1952 Winter Olympics in Helsinki.

== Results ==
=== Olympic Games ===
Year	Position
(Australia) 2000	Bronze medal
(Greece) 2004	5th
(China) 2008	7th
(United Kingdom) 2012	6th
(Brazil) 2016	Bronze medal
(Japan) 2020	4th

=== World Championship ===
Year	Position
(Italy) 1994	7th
(Australia) 1998	4th
(Japan) 2001	6th
(Spain) 2003	Bronze medal
(Canada) 2005	4th
(Australia) 2007	Bronze medal
(Italy) 2009	Bronze medal
(China) 2011	Bronze medal
(Spain) 2013	4th
(Russia) 2015	8th
(Hungary) 2017	Bronze medal
(South Korea) 2019	5th
(Hungary) 2022	Disqualified

=== FINA World Cup ===
- 1995 – 4th place
- 1997 – (silver) Silver medal
- 1999 – 7th place
- 2002 – 4th place
- 2006 – (bronze) Bronze medal
- 2010 – 4th place
- 2014 – 6th place
- 2018 – (silver) Silver medal
- 2026 – 4th place

=== FINA World League ===
- 2004 – 4th place
- 2005 – (silver) Silver medal
- 2006 – (bronze) Bronze medal
- 2007 – eliminated
- 2008 – (gold) Gold medal
- 2009 – 6th place
- 2010 – 4th place
- 2011 – 5th place
- 2012 – 5th place
- 2013 – (silver) Silver medal
- 2014 – 7th place
- 2015 – 5th place
- 2016 – 6th place
- 2017 – (bronze) Bronze medal
- 2018 – (bronze) Bronze medal
- 2020 – (bronze) Bronze medal

=== European Championship ===
Year	Position
(United Kingdom) 1993	Silver medal
(Austria) 1995	6th
(Spain) 1997	Silver medal
(Italy) 1999	Bronze medal
(Hungary) 2001	Bronze medal
(Slovenia) 2003	Bronze medal
(Serbia) 2006	Gold medal
(Spain) 2008	Gold medal
(Croatia) 2010	Gold medal
(Netherlands) 2012	4th
(Hungary) 2014	5th
(Serbia) 2016	6th
(Spain) 2018	5th
(Hungary) 2020	Silver medal
(Croatia) 2022	Disqualified

=== LEN Europa Cup ===
Year	Position
(Spain) 2018	2nd place, silver medalist(s)

== Team ==
=== Current squad ===
Roster for the 2020 Summer Olympics.

Head coach: Alexandr Gaidukov

No.	Player	Pos.	L/R	Height	Weight	Date of birth (age)	Apps	OG/ Goals	Club	Ref
1	Evgeniia Golovina	GK	R	1.73 m (5 ft 8 in)	68 kg (150 lb)	14 July 1999 (aged 22)	2	0/0	(Russia) Dinamo-Uralochka Zlatoust	
2	Maria Bersneva	D	R	1.68 m (5 ft 6 in)	61 kg (134 lb)	17 December 1998 (aged 22)	20	0/0	(Russia) Dinamo-Uralochka Zlatoust	
3	Ekaterina Prokofyeva (C)	CF	R	1.76 m (5 ft 9 in)	70 kg (154 lb)	13 March 1991 (aged 30)	150	3/20	(Russia) Kinef-Surgutneftegaz	
4	Elvina Karimova	D	R	1.66 m (5 ft 5 in)	62 kg (137 lb)	25 March 1994 (aged 27)	50	1/5	(Russia) Dinamo-Uralochka Zlatoust	
5	Veronika Vakhitova	CB	R	1.78 m (5 ft 10 in)	71 kg (157 lb)	13 June 1998 (aged 23)	60	0/0	(Russia) SKIF-CSP Moskomsporta	
6	Anastasia Fedotova	D	R	1.68 m (5 ft 6 in)	61 kg (134 lb)	30 November 1998 (aged 22)	27	0/0	(Russia) Spartak Volgograd	
7	Alena Serzhantova	D	R	1.73 m (5 ft 8 in)	72 kg (159 lb)	6 May 1998 (aged 23)	25	0/0	(Russia) SKIF-CSP Moskomsporta	
8	Anastasia Simanovich	CB	R	1.74 m (5 ft 9 in)	70 kg (154 lb)	23 January 1995 (aged 26)	100	1/10	(Russia) Kinef-Surgutneftegaz	
9	Anna Timofeeva	CB	R	1.78 m (5 ft 10 in)	87 kg (192 lb)	18 July 1987 (aged 34)	45	1/3	(Russia) Yugra	
10	Evgeniya Soboleva	CB	R	1.80 m (5 ft 11 in)	75 kg (165 lb)	26 August 1988 (aged 32)	120	3/6	(Russia) Kinef-Surgutneftegaz	
11	Evgeniya Ivanova	D	R	1.76 m (5 ft 9 in)	70 kg (154 lb)	26 July 1987 (aged 33)	80	2/16	(Russia) Kinef-Surgutneftegaz	
12	Nadezhda Glyzina	D	R	1.75 m (5 ft 9 in)	68 kg (150 lb)	20 May 1988 (aged 33)	167	3/18	(Russia) Kinef-Surgutneftegaz	
13	Anna Karnaukh	GK	R	1.73 m (5 ft 8 in)	61 kg (134 lb)	31 August 1993 (aged 27)	101	2/0	(Russia) Kinef-Surgutneftegaz	
Average				1.74 m (5 ft 9 in)	69 kg (152 lb)	27 years, 246 days	73			

Note: Age as of 23 July 2021
Source: ROC Women | Tokyo 2020 Olympics Archived 2021-07-22 at the Wayback Machine

=== Past squads ===
- 1999 European Championship – (bronze) Bronze medal

- Marina Akobia, Natalia Koutouzova, Sofia Konukh, Maria Koroleva, Svetlana Kouzina, Yuliya Petrova, Tatiana Petrova, Galina Rytova, Elena Smurova, Elena Tokoun, Irina Tolkounova and Ekaterina Vassilieva. Head Coach: Sergei Frolov.

- 2000 Olympic Games – (bronze) Bronze medal

- Marina Akobia, Ekaterina Anikeeva, Natalia Koutouzova, Sofia Konukh, Maria Koroleva, Svetlana Kouzina, Yuliya Petrova, Tatiana Petrova, Galina Rytova, Elena Smurova, Elena Tokoun, Irina Tolkounova and Ekaterina Vassilieva. Head Coach: Sergei Frolov.

- 2001 European Championship – (bronze) Bronze medal

- Marina Akobia, Galina Ritova, Valentina Voroncova, Svetlana Kouzina, Veronika Linkova, Olga Kallkova, Maria Yaina, Yekatyerina Szolotko, Anna Klocskova, Irina Tolkunova, Yekaterina Salimova, Anastassia Zoubkova, Tatiana Petrova, Natalia Shepelina and Natalya Kutuzova. Head Coach: Sergei Frolov.

- 2003 World Championship – (bronze) Bronze medal

- Svetlana Bogdanova, Sofia Konukh, Veronika Linkova, Tatiana Petrova, Yekaterina Salimova, Natalya Shepelina, Ekaterina Shishova, Elena Smurova, Olga Turova, Valentina Voronisova, Maria Yaina, Galina Zlotnikova and Anastassia Zoubkova. Head Coach: Yury Mitianin.

- 2006 European Championship – (gold) Gold medal

- Olga Fomicheva, Yulia Gaufler, Nadezda Glyzina, Evgeniya Ivanova, Sofia Konukh, Ekaterina Kuzbetsova, Ekaterina Pantyulina, Evgeniya Protsenko, Natalya Ryzhova-Alenicheva, Natalya Shepelina, Elena Smurova, Ekaterina Tankeyeva, Aleksandra Vorobeva, Alena Vylegzhanina and Anastasia Zubkova. Head Coach: Alexander Kleymenov.

- 2007 World Championship – (bronze) Bronze medal

- Olga Fomicheva, Nadezda Glyzina, Sofia Konukh, Maria Kovtunovskaya, Ekaterina Pantyulina, Natalya Ryzhova-Alenicheva, Natalya Shepelina, Elena Smurova, Evgenia Soboleva, Valentina Vorontsova, Alena Vylegzhanina, Ekaterina Zubacheva and Anastasia Zubkova. Head Coach: Alexander Kleymenov.

- 2008 FINA Olympic Qualifying Tournament – (silver) Silver medal

- Olga Belyaeva, Nadezda Glyzina, Sofia Konukh, Ekaterina Pantyulina, Natalya Shepelina, Ekaterina Prokofyeva, Evgeniya Protsenko, Evgenia Soboleva, Elena Smurova, Anna Timofeeva, Valentina Vorontsova, Alena Vylegzhanina and Anastasia Zubkova. Head Coach: Alexander Kleymenov.

- 2008 European Championship – (gold) Gold medal

- Valentina Vorontsova, Natalia Shepelina, Ekaterina Prokofyeva, Sofia Konukh, Alena Vylegzhanina, Nadezda Glyzina, Ekaterina Pantyulina, Evgenia Soboleva, Oleksandra Karpovich, Olga Belyaeva, Elena Smurova, Olga Turova and Evgeniya Protsenko. Head Coach: Alexander Kleymenov.

- 2015 European Games – (gold) Gold medal

- Maria Bersneva, Anastasia Fedotova, Daria Gerzanich, Evgenia Golovina, Anna Isakova, Polina Kempf, Bella Khamzaeva (c), Elena Kotanchyan, Alena Serzhantova, Svetlana Stepakhina, Veronika Vakhitova, Elizaveta Zaplatina, Aleksandra Zelenkovskaya. Coaches: Andrei Belofastov, Alexander Fedoseev.

== Under-20 team ==
Russia's women have won three titles at the FINA Junior Water Polo World Championships, including back-to-back titles at the 2017 and 2019 events. Its first crown came in 2009 at home in Khanty-Mansiysk, beating the Dutch in the final.

At the most recent 2021 event, Russia headlined Group D, which also featured Hungary, Brazil and Uzbekistan.

== See also ==
- Russia women's Olympic water polo team records and statistics
- Russia men's national water polo team
- The Soviet Union women's national water polo team was only formed in 1990 and disbanded a year later with the end of the USSR
