= List of women's Olympic water polo tournament top goalscorers =

This is a list of top goalscorers in the women's Olympic water polo tournament since the inaugural official edition in 2000.

== Abbreviations ==
| Rk | Rank | Ref | Reference | | | ISHOF | International Swimming Hall of Fame |
| L/R | Handedness | L | Left-handed | R | Right-handed | | |
| (C) | Captain | p. | page | pp. | pages | | |

== Overall top goalscorers ==
As of 2016, eighteen female players have scored 20 or more goals at the Summer Olympics.

=== By confederation ===
Last updated: 1 April 2021.

| Confederation | Number of top goalscorers | | | |
| Confederation | Total goals: 40+ | Total goals: 30–39 | Total goals: 20–29 | Total |
|---|---|---|---|---|
| Africa – CANA | 0 | 0 | 0 | 0 |
| Americas – UANA | 0 | 2 | 0 | 2 |
| Asia – AASF | 0 | 1 | 0 | 1 |
| Europe – LEN | 1 | 1 | 8 | 10 |
| Oceania – OSA | 0 | 1 | 4 | 5 |
| Total | 1 | 5 | 12 | 18 |

=== By team ===
Last updated: 1 April 2021.

| Women's team | Number of top goalscorers | | | | Confederation |
| Women's team | Total goals: 40+ | Total goals: 30–39 | Total goals: 20–29 | Total | Confederation |
|---|---|---|---|---|---|
| Australia | 0 | 1 | 4 | 5 | Oceania – OSA |
| China | 0 | 1 | 0 | 1 | Asia – AASF |
| Hungary | 0 | 0 | 3 | 3 | Europe – LEN |
| Italy | 1 | 0 | 0 | 1 | Europe – LEN |
| Netherlands | 0 | 0 | 1 | 1 | Europe – LEN |
| Russia | 0 | 1 | 2 | 3 | Europe – LEN |
| Spain | 0 | 0 | 2 | 2 | Europe – LEN |
| United States | 0 | 2 | 0 | 2 | Americas – UANA |
| Total | 1 | 5 | 12 | 18 | |

== Most goals scored ==
=== One match ===
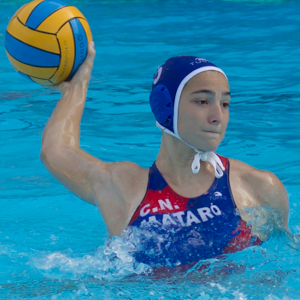
Roser Tarragó of Spain is one of three female players to score seven goals in an Olympic match.

The following table is pre-sorted by date of the match (in ascending order), name of the player (in ascending order), respectively. Last updated: 1 April 2021.

Three female water polo players have each scored seven goals in an Olympic match.

The first woman to do so was Daniëlle de Bruijn, with the Netherlands women's national team in Beijing on 21 August 2008. She netted seven goals in the gold medal match, helping the Dutch team win the Olympics.

The most recent female player to do so was Roser Tarragó, with Spain women's national team in Rio de Janeiro on 19 August 2016.

Legend and abbreviation

- – Player's team drew the match
- – Player's team lost the match
- Team – Host team
- Player^{‡} – Player who won the tournament with her team
- G – Goals
- aet – After extra time
- pso – Penalty shootout

Female players with seven or more goals in an Olympic match
| # | G | Player | Birth | Age | Height | L/R | For | Result | Against | Tournament | Round | Date | Ref |
|---|---|---|---|---|---|---|---|---|---|---|---|---|---|
| 1 | 7 | Daniëlle de Bruijn^{‡} | 1978 | 30 | 1.72 m (5 ft 8 in) | Left | Netherlands | 9–8 | United States | Beijing 2008 | Gold medal match | 21 Aug 2008 | |
| 2 | 7 | Maggie Steffens^{‡} | 1993 | 19 | 1.73 m (5 ft 8 in) | Right | United States | 14–13 | Hungary | London 2012 | Preliminary round Group A | 30 Jul 2012 | |
| 3 | 7 | Roser Tarragó | 1993 | 23 | 1.71 m (5 ft 7 in) | Right | Spain | 12–10 | Australia | Rio 2016 | 5th–6th place match | 19 Aug 2016 | |

The following table shows the historical progression of the record of goals scored by a female water polo player in a single Olympic match. Last updated: 1 April 2021.

Legend

- Team – Host team
- Player^{‡} – Player who won the tournament with his team

Historical progression of records: Most goals scored by a female player, one match
| Goals | Achievement | Year | Player | Age | Height | L/R | Women's team | Date | Duration of record | Ref |
|---|---|---|---|---|---|---|---|---|---|---|
| 5 | Set record | 2004 | Kyriaki Liosi | 24 | 1.70 m (5 ft 7 in) | Right | Greece | 26 August 2004 | 3 years, 361 days | |
| 5 | Tied record | 2008 | Kate Gynther | 26 | 1.75 m (5 ft 9 in) | Right | Australia | 17 August 2008 | 3 years, 361 days | |
| 7 | Broke record | 2008 | Daniëlle de Bruijn^{‡} | 30 | 1.72 m (5 ft 8 in) | Left | Netherlands | 21 August 2008 | 17 years, 191 days | |
| 7 | Tied record | 2012 | Maggie Steffens^{‡} | 19 | 1.73 m (5 ft 8 in) | Right | United States | 30 July 2012 | 17 years, 191 days | |
| 7 | Tied record | 2016 | Roser Tarragó | 23 | 1.71 m (5 ft 7 in) | Right | Spain | 19 August 2016 | 17 years, 191 days | |

=== One tournament ===
The following table is pre-sorted by number of goals (in descending order), edition of the Olympics (in ascending order), number of matches played (in ascending order), name of the player (in ascending order), respectively. Last updated: 12 August 2021.

Seven female players have scored 18 or more goals in an Olympic water polo tournament.

At the 2020 Summer Olympics, Dutch left-hander Simone van de Kraats scored 28 goals, setting the record for the most goals scored by a female water polo player in a single Olympic tournament.

Maggie Steffens of the United States is the first and only female water polo player to achieve this feat twice. At the 2012 Summer Olympics, Steffens netted 21 goals. Nine years later, she scored 18 goals in Tokyo.

Legend

- Team – Host team
- Player^{‡} – Player who won the tournament with her team

Female players with 18 or more goals in an Olympic tournament
| Rk | Year | Player | Birth | Age | Height | L/R | Goals | Matches played | Goals per match | Women's team | Finish | Ref |
|---|---|---|---|---|---|---|---|---|---|---|---|---|
| 1 | 2020 | Simone van de Kraats | 2000 | 20 | 1.80 m (5 ft 11 in) | Left | 28 | 7 | 4.000 | Netherlands | 6th of 10 teams | |
| 2 | 2012 | Maggie Steffens^{‡} | 1993 | 19 | 1.73 m (5 ft 8 in) | Right | 21 | 6 | 3.500 | United States | 1st of 8 teams | |
| 3 | 2012 | Ma Huanhuan | 1990 | 22 | 1.78 m (5 ft 10 in) | Right | 19 | 6 | 3.167 | China | 5th of 8 teams | |
| 4 | 2012 | Tania Di Mario | 1979 | 33 | 1.68 m (5 ft 6 in) | Right | 18 | 6 | 3.000 | Italy | 7th of 8 teams | |
| 4 | 2020 | Maddie Musselman^{‡} | 1998 | 23 | 1.80 m (5 ft 11 in) | Right | 18 | 7 | 2.571 | United States | 1st of 10 teams | |
| 4 | 2020 | Beatriz Ortiz | 1995 | 26 | 1.76 m (5 ft 9 in) | Right | 18 | 7 | 2.571 | Spain | 2nd of 10 teams | |
| 4 | 2020 | Maggie Steffens^{‡} (2) | 1993 | 28 | 1.73 m (5 ft 8 in) | Right | 18 | 7 | 2.571 | United States | 1st of 10 teams | |
| Rk | Year | Player | Birth | Age | Height | L/R | Goals | Matches played | Goals per match | Women's team | Finish | Ref |

- Official Results Books (PDF): 2000 (pp. 96–101), 2004 (p. 53), 2008 (p. 54), 2012 (p. 345), 2016 (p. 193), 2020 (p. 234).

The following table is pre-sorted by edition of the Olympics (in ascending order), name of the team (in ascending order), number of goals (in descending order), name of the player (in ascending order), respectively. Last updated: 12 August 2021.

Legend

- Team^{*} – Host team

Female players with 15 or more goals in an Olympic tournament (ordered chronologically)
| Year | Total | 21+ goals | | 18–20 goals | | 15–17 goals | |
|---|---|---|---|---|---|---|---|
| 2000 | 0 | — | 0 | — | 0 | — | 0 |
| 2004 | 0 | — | 0 | — | 0 | — | 0 |
| 2008 | 1 | — | 0 | — | 0 | Netherlands: Daniëlle de Bruijn (17) | 1 |
| 2012 | 4 | United States: Maggie Steffens (21) | 1 | China: Ma Huanhuan (19); Italy: Tania Di Mario (18) | 2 | Spain: Anni Espar (15) | 1 |
| 2016 | 3 | — | 0 | — | 0 | Hungary: Barbara Bujka (15); Spain: Roser Tarragó (15); United States: Maggie Steffens (17) | 3 |
| 2020 | 9 | Netherlands: Simone van de Kraats (28) | 1 | Spain: Beatriz Ortiz (18); United States: Maddie Musselman (18), Maggie Steffens (18) | 3 | Canada: Kyra Christmas (15); China: Zhang Jing (16); Netherlands: Maud Megens (17); ROC: Ekaterina Prokofyeva (15); Spain: Anni Espar (15) | 5 |
| Year | Total | 21+ goals | | 18–20 goals | | 15–17 goals | |

- Official Results Books (PDF): 2000 (pp. 96–101), 2004 (p. 53), 2008 (p. 54), 2012 (p. 345), 2016 (p. 193), 2020 (p. 234).

==== Top goalscorers in each tournament ====
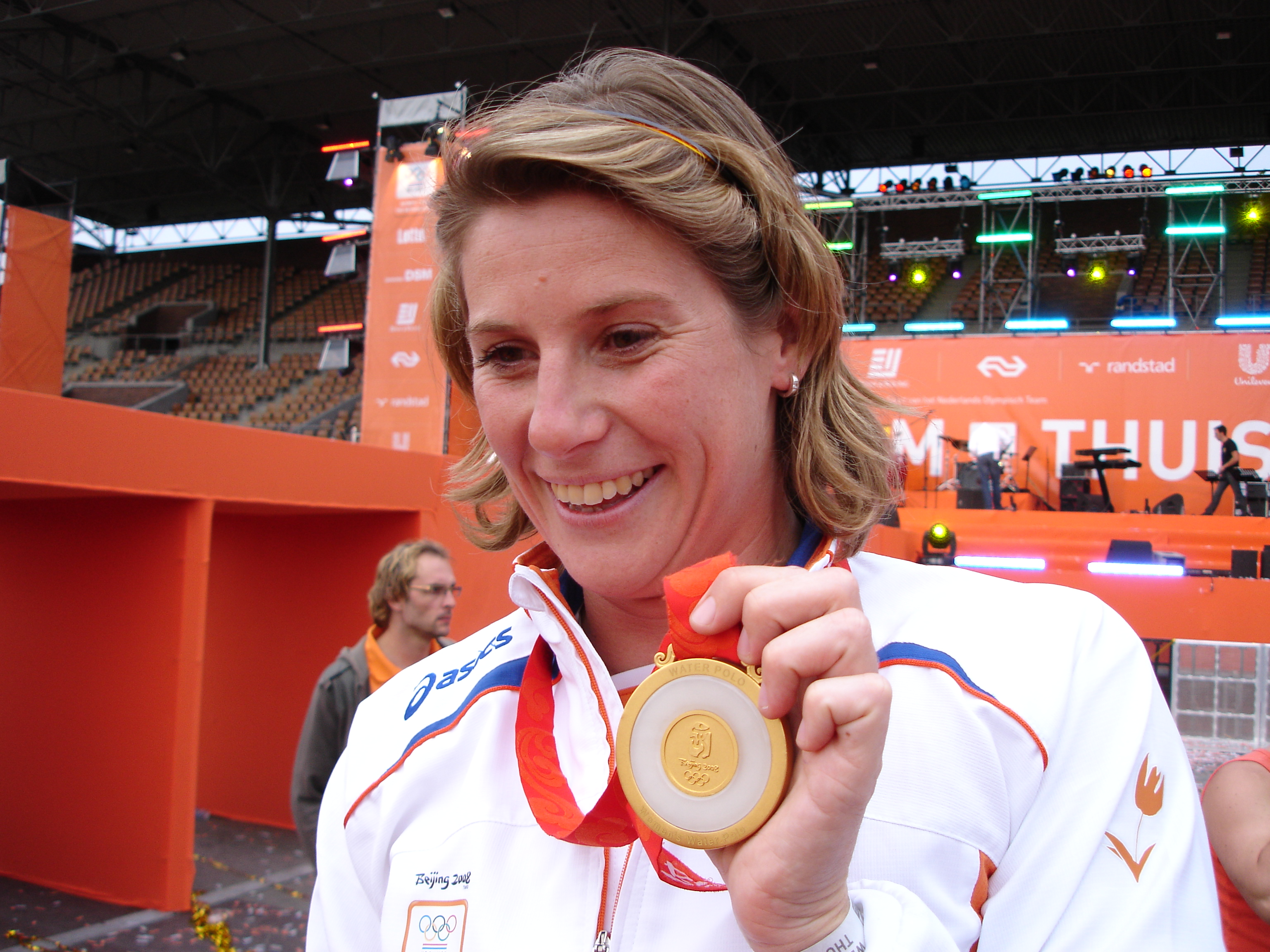
Daniëlle de Bruijn of the Netherlands scored 11 and 17 goals at the 2000 and 2008 Olympics, respectively.

The following table is pre-sorted by edition of the Olympics (in ascending order), number of matches played (in ascending order), name of the player (in ascending order), respectively. Last updated: 12 August 2021.

At 19 years old, Maggie Steffens of the United States made her Olympic debut at the 2012 London Olympics, where she was the youngest-ever female top goalscorer with 21 goals. She was also the top goalscorer at the 2016 Rio Olympics, with 17 goals.

Dutch left-handed player Daniëlle de Bruijn was the joint top goalscorer at the 2000 Olympics, with 11 goals. Eight years later she netted 17 goals, including seven goals in the gold medal match, becoming the top goalscorer at the 2008 Olympics.

Legend

- Team – Host team
- Player^{‡} – Player who won the tournament with her team

Female players with the most goals in each Olympic tournament
| Year | Player | Birth | Age | Height | L/R | Goals | Matches played | Goals per match | Women's team | Finish | Ref |
|---|---|---|---|---|---|---|---|---|---|---|---|
| 2000 | Daniëlle de Bruijn | 1978 | 22 | 1.72 m (5 ft 8 in) | Left | 11 | 7 | 1.571 | Netherlands | 4th of 6 teams | |
| 2000 | Bridgette Gusterson^{‡} | 1973 | 27 | 1.80 m (5 ft 11 in) | Right | 11 | 7 | 1.571 | Australia | 1st of 6 teams | |
| 2000 | Sofia Konukh | 1980 | 20 | 1.73 m (5 ft 8 in) | Right | 11 | 7 | 1.571 | Russia | 3rd of 6 teams | |
| 2004 | Tania Di Mario^{‡} | 1979 | 25 | 1.68 m (5 ft 6 in) | Right | 14 | 6 | 2.333 | Italy | 1st of 8 teams | |
| 2008 | Daniëlle de Bruijn^{‡} (2) | 1978 | 30 | 1.72 m (5 ft 8 in) | Left | 17 | 6 | 2.833 | Netherlands | 1st of 8 teams | |
| 2012 | Maggie Steffens^{‡} | 1993 | 19 | 1.73 m (5 ft 8 in) | Right | 21 | 6 | 3.500 | United States | 1st of 8 teams | |
| 2016 | Maggie Steffens^{‡} (2) | 1993 | 23 | 1.73 m (5 ft 8 in) | Right | 17 | 6 | 2.833 | United States | 1st of 8 teams | |
| 2020 | Simone van de Kraats | 2000 | 20 | 1.80 m (5 ft 11 in) | Left | 28 | 7 | 4.000 | Netherlands | 6th of 10 teams | |

- Official Results Books (PDF): 2000 (pp. 96–101), 2004 (p. 53), 2008 (p. 54), 2012 (p. 345), 2016 (p. 193), 2020 (p. 234).

The following table shows the historical progression of the record of goals scored by a female water polo player in a single Olympic tournament. Last updated: 12 August 2021.

Legend

- Team – Host team
- Player^{‡} – Player who won the tournament with her team

Historical progression of records: Most goals scored by a female player, one tournament
| Goals | Achievement | Year | Player | Age | Height | L/R | Women's team | Date | Duration of record | Ref |
|---|---|---|---|---|---|---|---|---|---|---|
| 11 | Set record | 2000 | Daniëlle de Bruijn | 22 | 1.72 m (5 ft 8 in) | Left | Netherlands | 23 September 2000 | 3 years, 338 days | |
| 11 | Set record | 2000 | Bridgette Gusterson^{‡} | 27 | 1.80 m (5 ft 11 in) | Right | Australia | 23 September 2000 | 3 years, 338 days | |
| 11 | Set record | 2000 | Sofia Konukh | 20 | 1.73 m (5 ft 8 in) | Right | Russia | 23 September 2000 | 3 years, 338 days | |
| 14 | Broke record | 2004 | Tania Di Mario^{‡} | 25 | 1.68 m (5 ft 6 in) | Right | Italy | 26 August 2004 | 3 years, 361 days | |
| 17 | Broke record | 2008 | Daniëlle de Bruijn^{‡} (2) | 30 | 1.72 m (5 ft 8 in) | Left | Netherlands | 21 August 2008 | 3 years, 354 days | |
| 21 | Broke record | 2012 | Maggie Steffens^{‡} | 19 | 1.73 m (5 ft 8 in) | Right | United States | 9 August 2012 | 8 years, 363 days | |
| 28 | Broke record | 2020 | Simone van de Kraats | 20 | 1.80 m (5 ft 11 in) | Left | Netherlands | 7 August 2021 | 4 years, 205 days | |

=== All-time ===
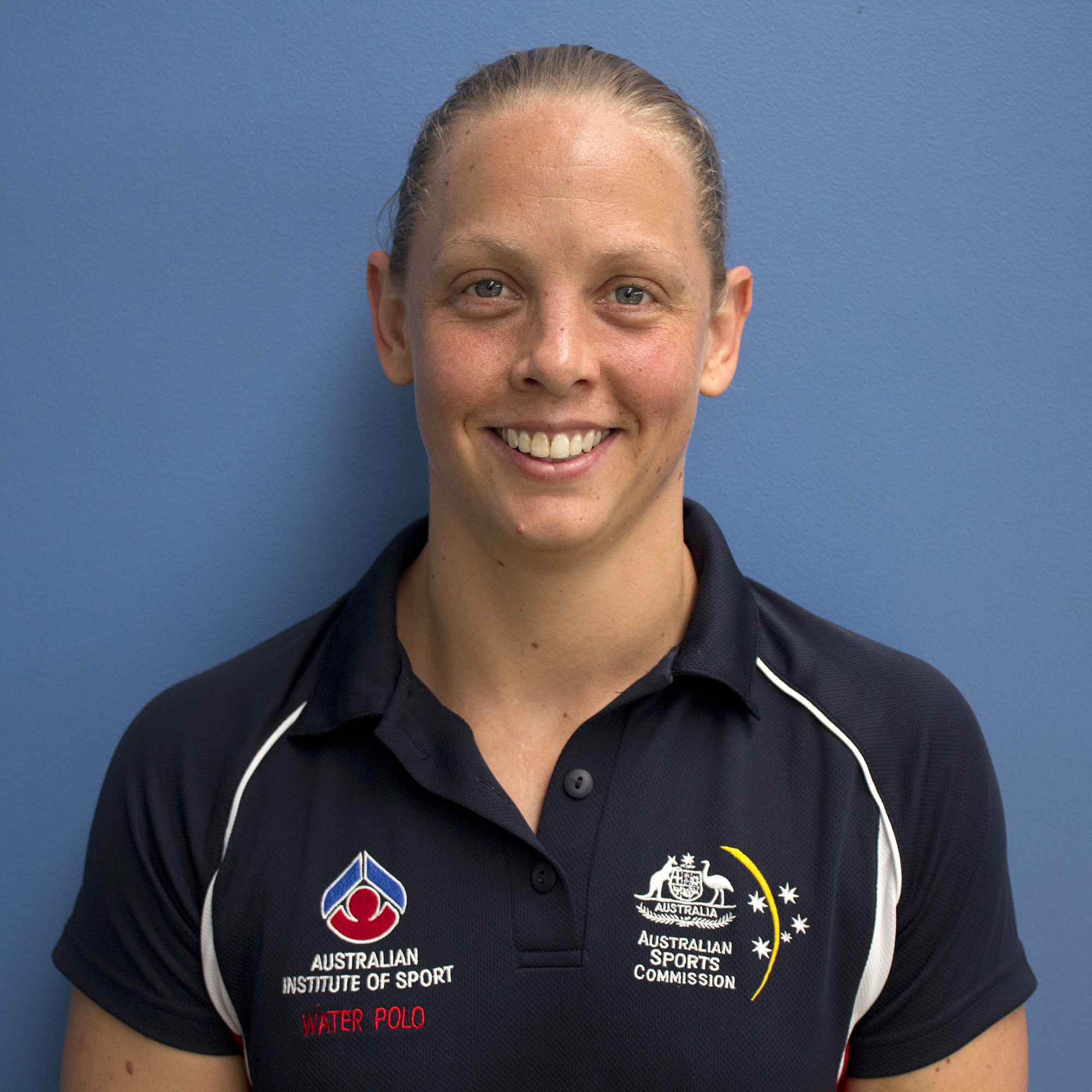
Kate Gynther of Australia scored 30 goals at three Olympics (2004–2012).

The following table is pre-sorted by number of total goals (in descending order), number of total Olympic matches played (in ascending order), date of the last Olympic match played (in ascending order), date of the first Olympic match played (in ascending order), name of the player (in ascending order), respectively. Last updated: 7 August 2021.

Three-time Olympian Maggie Steffens of the United States holds the record for the most goals scored by a female water polo player in Olympic history, with 56 goals.

Italian Tania Di Mario netted 47 goals at four Olympics (2004–2016).

Ma Huanhuan, representing China, holds the record for the most goals scored by an Asian female water polo player in Olympic history, with 37 goals at three Olympics (2008–2016).

Kate Gynther of Australia netted 30 goals in 32 matches between 2004 and 2012.

Legend

- – Hosts

All-time female players with 30 or more goals at the Olympics
| Rk | Player | Birth | Height | L/R | Women's team | Total goals | Total matches played | Goals per match | Tournaments (goals) | | | | Period (age of first/last) | Medals | | | | Ref |
| Rk | Player | Birth | Height | L/R | Women's team | Total goals | Total matches played | Goals per match | 1 | 2 | 3 | 4 | Period (age of first/last) | G | S | B | T | Ref |
|---|---|---|---|---|---|---|---|---|---|---|---|---|---|---|---|---|---|---|
| 1 | Maggie Steffens | 1993 | 1.73 m (5 ft 8 in) | Right | United States | 56 | 19 | 2.947 | 2012 (21) | 2016 (17) | 2020 (18) | | 9 years (19/28) | 3 | 0 | 0 | 3 | |
| 2 | Tania Di Mario | 1979 | 1.68 m (5 ft 6 in) | Right | Italy | 47 | 23 | 2.043 | 2004 (14) | 2008 (10) | 2012 (18) | 2016 (5) | 12 years (25/37) | 1 | 1 | 0 | 2 | |
| 3 | Ma Huanhuan | 1990 | 1.78 m (5 ft 10 in) | Right | China | 37 | 17 | 2.176 | 2008 (7) | 2012 (19) | 2016 (11) | | 8 years (18/26) | 0 | 0 | 0 | 0 | |
| 4 | Sofia Konukh | 1980 | 1.73 m (5 ft 8 in) | Right | Russia | 31 | 22 | 1.409 | 2000 (11) | 2004 (9) | 2008 (7) | 2012 (4) | 12 years (20/32) | 0 | 0 | 1 | 1 | |
| 5 | Brenda Villa | 1980 | 1.63 m (5 ft 4 in) | Right | United States | 31 | 23 | 1.348 | 2000 (9) | 2004 (7) | 2008 (9) | 2012 (6) | 12 years (20/32) | 1 | 2 | 1 | 4 | |
| 6 | Kate Gynther | 1982 | 1.75 m (5 ft 9 in) | Right | Australia | 30 | 17 | 1.765 | 2004 (7) | 2008 (13) | 2012 (10) | | 8 years (22/30) | 0 | 0 | 2 | 2 | |

- Official Results Books (PDF): 2000 (pp. 96–101), 2004 (p. 53), 2008 (p. 54), 2012 (p. 345), 2016 (p. 193).

The following table is pre-sorted by edition of the Olympics (in ascending order), name of the team (in ascending order), number of total goals (in descending order), name of the player (in ascending order), respectively. Last updated: 1 April 2021.

Legend

- Team^{*} – Host team

All-time female players with 20 or more goals at the Olympics (ordered chronologically)
| Year | Total | Total goals: 40+ | | Total goals: 30–39 | | Total goals: 20–29 | |
|---|---|---|---|---|---|---|---|
| 2000 | 0 | — | 0 | — | 0 | — | 0 |
| 2004 | 1 | — | 0 | — | 0 | Russia: Sofia Konukh (20) | 1 |
| 2008 | 5 | — | 0 | — | 0 | Australia: Kate Gynther (20); Italy: Tania Di Mario (24); Netherlands: Daniëlle de Bruijn (28); Russia: Sofia Konukh (27); United States: Brenda Villa (25) | 5 |
| 2012 | 7 | Italy: Tania Di Mario (42) | 1 | Australia: Kate Gynther (30); Russia: Sofia Konukh (31); United States: Brenda Villa (31) | 3 | China: Ma Huanhuan (26); Hungary: Rita Drávucz (23); United States: Maggie Steffens (21) | 3 |
| 2016 | 13 | Italy: Tania Di Mario (47) | 1 | China: Ma Huanhuan (37); United States: Maggie Steffens (38) | 2 | Australia: Ashleigh Southern (26), Rowena Webster (23), Gemma Beadsworth (20), Bronwen Knox (20); Hungary: Barbara Bujka (27), Rita Keszthelyi (24); Russia: Ekaterina Prokofyeva (22), Nadezhda Glyzina (21); Spain: Anni Espar (22), Roser Tarragó (20) | 10 |
| 2020 | | | | | | | |
| Year | Total | Total goals: 40+ | | Total goals: 30–39 | | Total goals: 20–29 | |

- Official Results Books (PDF): 2000 (pp. 96–101), 2004 (p. 53), 2008 (p. 54), 2012 (p. 345), 2016 (p. 193).

The following table shows the historical progression of the record of total goals scored by a female water polo player at the Summer Olympics. Last updated: 7 August 2021.

Legend

- Team – Host team
- Player^{‡} – Player who won the tournament with her team

Historical progression of records: Most goals scored by a female player, all-time
| Total goals | Achievement | Year | Player | Age | Height | L/R | Women's team | Date | Duration of record | Ref |
|---|---|---|---|---|---|---|---|---|---|---|
| 20 | Set record | 2004 | Sofia Konukh | 24 | 1.73 m (5 ft 8 in) | Right | Russia | 26 August 2004 | 3 years, 361 days | |
| 28 | Broke record | 2008 | Daniëlle de Bruijn | 30 | 1.72 m (5 ft 8 in) | Left | Netherlands | 21 August 2008 | 3 years, 354 days | |
| 42 | Broke record | 2012 | Tania Di Mario | 33 | 1.68 m (5 ft 6 in) | Right | Italy | 9 August 2012 | 4 years, 10 days | |
| 47 | Broke record | 2016 | Tania Di Mario (2) | 37 | 1.68 m (5 ft 6 in) | Right | Italy | 19 August 2016 | 4 years, 353 days | |
| 56 | Broke record | 2020 | Maggie Steffens | 28 | 1.73 m (5 ft 8 in) | Right | United States | 7 August 2021 | 4 years, 205 days | |

== Top goalscorers by team ==
The following tables are pre-sorted by number of total goals (in descending order), year of the last Olympic appearance (in ascending order), year of the first Olympic appearance (in ascending order), name of the player (in ascending order), respectively.

Legend

- Year^{*} – As host team

=== Australia ===
- Women's national team: Australia
- Team appearances: 6 (2000^{*}–2020)
- As host team: 2000^{*}

* Number of goalscorers (40+ goals): 0

- Number of goalscorers (30–39 goals): 1
- Number of goalscorers (20–29 goals): 4
- Last updated: 1 April 2021.

Legend

- – Hosts

Female players with 20 or more goals at the Olympics
| Rk | Player | Birth | L/R | Total goals | Water polo tournaments (goals) | | | | | Age of first/last | ISHOF member | Note | Ref |
| Rk | Player | Birth | L/R | Total goals | 1 | 2 | 3 | 4 | 5 | Age of first/last | ISHOF member | Note | Ref |
|---|---|---|---|---|---|---|---|---|---|---|---|---|---|
| 1 | Kate Gynther | 1982 | Right | 30 | 2004 (7) | 2008 (13) | 2012 (10) | | | 22/30 | | | |
| 2 | Ashleigh Southern | 1992 | Right | 26 | 2012 (12) | 2016 (14) | | | | 19/23 | | | |
| 3 | Rowena Webster | 1987 | Right | 23 | 2012 (12) | 2016 (11) | | | | 24/28 | | | |
| 4 | Gemma Beadsworth | 1987 | Right | 20 | 2008 (9) | 2012 (10) | 2016 (1) | | | 21/29 | | | |
| 4 | Bronwen Knox | 1986 | Right | 20 | 2008 (12) | 2012 (4) | 2016 (4) | | | 22/30 | | | |

- Official Results Books (PDF): 2000 (p. 96), 2004 (pp. 56–57), 2008 (pp. 56–57), 2012 (pp. 347–348), 2016 (pp. 197–198).

=== Brazil ===
- Women's national team: Brazil
- Team appearances: 1 (2016^{*})
- As host team: 2016^{*}
- Number of goalscorers (40+ goals): 0
- Number of goalscorers (30–39 goals): 0
- Number of goalscorers (20–29 goals): 0
- Last updated: 1 April 2021.

=== Canada ===
- Women's national team: Canada
- Team appearances: 3 (2000–2004, 2020)
- As host team: —

* Number of goalscorers (40+ goals): 0

- Number of goalscorers (30–39 goals): 0
- Number of goalscorers (20–29 goals): 0
- Last updated: 1 April 2021.

=== China ===
- Women's national team: China
- Team appearances: 4 (2008^{*}–2020)
- As host team: 2008^{*}

* Number of goalscorers (40+ goals): 0

- Number of goalscorers (30–39 goals): 1
- Number of goalscorers (20–29 goals): 0
- Last updated: 1 April 2021.

Legend

- – Hosts

Female players with 20 or more goals at the Olympics
| Rk | Player | Birth | L/R | Total goals | Water polo tournaments (goals) | | | | | Age of first/last | ISHOF member | Note | Ref |
| Rk | Player | Birth | L/R | Total goals | 1 | 2 | 3 | 4 | 5 | Age of first/last | ISHOF member | Note | Ref |
|---|---|---|---|---|---|---|---|---|---|---|---|---|---|
| 1 | Ma Huanhuan | 1990 | Right | 37 | 2008 (7) | 2012 (19) | 2016 (11) | | | 18/26 | | | |

- Official Results Books (PDF): 2008 (pp. 59–60), 2012 (pp. 350–351), 2016 (pp. 203–204).

=== Great Britain ===
- Women's national team: Great Britain
- Team appearances: 1 (2012^{*})
- As host team: 2012^{*}
- Number of goalscorers (40+ goals): 0
- Number of goalscorers (30–39 goals): 0
- Number of goalscorers (20–29 goals): 0
- Last updated: 1 April 2021.

=== Greece ===
- Women's national team: Greece
- Team appearances: 2 (2004^{*}–2008)
- As host team: 2004^{*}

* Number of goalscorers (40+ goals): 0

- Number of goalscorers (30–39 goals): 0
- Number of goalscorers (20–29 goals): 0
- Last updated: 1 April 2021.

=== Hungary ===
- Women's national team: Hungary
- Team appearances: 5 (2004–2020)
- As host team: —

* Number of goalscorers (40+ goals): 0

- Number of goalscorers (30–39 goals): 0
- Number of goalscorers (20–29 goals): 3
- Last updated: 1 April 2021.

Female players with 20 or more goals at the Olympics
| Rk | Player | Birth | L/R | Total goals | Water polo tournaments (goals) | | | | | Age of first/last | ISHOF member | Note | Ref |
| Rk | Player | Birth | L/R | Total goals | 1 | 2 | 3 | 4 | 5 | Age of first/last | ISHOF member | Note | Ref |
|---|---|---|---|---|---|---|---|---|---|---|---|---|---|
| 1 | Barbara Bujka | 1986 | Left | 27 | 2012 (12) | 2016 (15) | | | | 25/29 | | | |
| 2 | Rita Keszthelyi | 1991 | Right | 24 | 2012 (10) | 2016 (14) | | | | 20/24 | | | |
| 3 | Rita Drávucz | 1980 | Right | 23 | 2004 (7) | 2008 (10) | 2012 (6) | | | 24/32 | | | |

- Official Results Books (PDF): 2004 (pp. 68–69), 2008 (pp. 65–66), 2012 (pp. 359–360), 2016 (pp. 209–210).

=== Italy ===
- Women's national team: Italy
- Team appearances: 4 (2004–2016)
- As host team: —

* Number of goalscorers (40+ goals): 1

- Number of goalscorers (30–39 goals): 0
- Number of goalscorers (20–29 goals): 0
- Last updated: 1 April 2021.

Female players with 20 or more goals at the Olympics
| Rk | Player | Birth | L/R | Total goals | Water polo tournaments (goals) | | | | | Age of first/last | ISHOF member | Note | Ref |
| Rk | Player | Birth | L/R | Total goals | 1 | 2 | 3 | 4 | 5 | Age of first/last | ISHOF member | Note | Ref |
|---|---|---|---|---|---|---|---|---|---|---|---|---|---|
| 1 | Tania Di Mario | 1979 | Right | 47 | 2004 (14) | 2008 (10) | 2012 (18) | 2016 (5) | | 25/37 | | | |

- Official Results Books (PDF): 2004 (pp. 72–73), 2008 (pp. 68–69), 2012 (pp. 362–363), 2016 (pp. 212–213).

=== Japan ===
- Women's national team: Japan
- Team appearances: 1 (2020^{*})
- As host team: 2020^{*}
- Number of goalscorers (40+ goals): 0
- Number of goalscorers (30–39 goals): 0
- Number of goalscorers (20–29 goals): 0
- Last updated: 26 July 2021.

=== Kazakhstan ===
- Women's national team: Kazakhstan
- Team appearances: 2 (2000–2004)
- As host team: —
- Number of goalscorers (40+ goals): 0
- Number of goalscorers (30–39 goals): 0
- Number of goalscorers (20–29 goals): 0
- Last updated: 1 April 2021.

=== Netherlands ===
- Women's national team: Netherlands
- Team appearances: 3 (2000, 2008, 2020)
- As host team: —

* Number of goalscorers (40+ goals): 0

- Number of goalscorers (30–39 goals): 0
- Number of goalscorers (20–29 goals): 1
- Last updated: 1 April 2021.

Female players with 20 or more goals at the Olympics
| Rk | Player | Birth | L/R | Total goals | Water polo tournaments (goals) | | | | | Age of first/last | ISHOF member | Note | Ref |
| Rk | Player | Birth | L/R | Total goals | 1 | 2 | 3 | 4 | 5 | Age of first/last | ISHOF member | Note | Ref |
|---|---|---|---|---|---|---|---|---|---|---|---|---|---|
| 1 | Daniëlle de Bruijn | 1978 | Left | 28 | 2000 (11) | | 2008 (17) | | | 22/30 | | | |

- Official Results Books (PDF): 2000 (p. 99), 2008 (pp. 71–72).

=== ROC ===
- Women's national team: ROC
- Team appearances: 1 (2020)
- As host team: —
- Related team: Russia
- Number of goalscorers (40+ goals): 0
- Number of goalscorers (30–39 goals): 1
- Number of goalscorers (20–29 goals): 2
- Last updated: 12 August 2021.

Female players with 20 or more goals at the Olympics
| Rk | Player | Birth | L/R | Total goals | Water polo tournaments (goals) | | | | | Age of first/last | ISHOF member | Note | Ref |
| Rk | Player | Birth | L/R | Total goals | 1 | 2 | 3 | 4 | 5 | Age of first/last | ISHOF member | Note | Ref |
|---|---|---|---|---|---|---|---|---|---|---|---|---|---|
| 1 | Ekaterina Prokofyeva | 1991 | Right | 37 | 2008 (4) | 2012 (9) | 2016 (9) | 2020 (15) | | 17/30 | | | |
| 2 | Nadezhda Glyzina | 1988 | Right | 28 | 2008 (1) | 2012 (7) | 2016 (13) | 2020 (7) | | 20/33 | | | |
| 3 | Evgeniya Ivanova | 1987 | Right | 26 | 2012 (9) | 2016 (7) | 2020 (10) | | | 25/34 | | | |

- Official Results Books (PDF): 2008 (pp. 74–75), 2012 (pp. 365–366), 2016 (pp. 215–216), 2020 (pp. 266–267).

=== Russia ===
- Women's national team: Russia
- Team appearances: 5 (2000–2016)
- As host team: —
- Related team: ROC
- Number of goalscorers (40+ goals): 0
- Number of goalscorers (30–39 goals): 1
- Number of goalscorers (20–29 goals): 0
- Last updated: 12 August 2021.

Female players with 20 or more goals at the Olympics
| Rk | Player | Birth | L/R | Total goals | Water polo tournaments (goals) | | | | | Age of first/last | ISHOF member | Note | Ref |
| Rk | Player | Birth | L/R | Total goals | 1 | 2 | 3 | 4 | 5 | Age of first/last | ISHOF member | Note | Ref |
|---|---|---|---|---|---|---|---|---|---|---|---|---|---|
| 1 | Sofia Konukh | 1980 | Right | 31 | 2000 (11) | 2004 (9) | 2008 (7) | 2012 (4) | | 20/32 | | | |

- Official Results Books (PDF): 2000 (p. 100), 2004 (pp. 80–81), 2008 (pp. 74–75), 2012 (pp. 365–366), 2016 (pp. 215–216).

Notes:

- Nadezhda Glyzina is listed in section ROC.
- Evgeniya Ivanova is listed in section ROC.
- Ekaterina Prokofyeva is listed in section ROC.

=== South Africa ===
- Women's national team: South Africa
- Team appearances: 1 (2020)
- As host team: —
- Number of goalscorers (40+ goals): 0
- Number of goalscorers (30–39 goals): 0
- Number of goalscorers (20–29 goals): 0
- Last updated: 12 August 2021.

=== Spain ===
- Women's national team: Spain
- Team appearances: 3 (2012–2020)
- As host team: —

* Number of goalscorers (40+ goals): 0

- Number of goalscorers (30–39 goals): 1
- Number of goalscorers (20–29 goals): 4
- Last updated: 12 August 2021.

Female players with 20 or more goals at the Olympics
| Rk | Player | Birth | L/R | Total goals | Water polo tournaments (goals) | | | | | Age of first/last | ISHOF member | Note | Ref |
| Rk | Player | Birth | L/R | Total goals | 1 | 2 | 3 | 4 | 5 | Age of first/last | ISHOF member | Note | Ref |
|---|---|---|---|---|---|---|---|---|---|---|---|---|---|
| 1 | Anni Espar | 1993 | Right | 37 | 2012 (15) | 2016 (7) | 2020 (15) | | | 19/28 | | | |
| 2 | Roser Tarragó | 1993 | Right | 29 | 2012 (5) | 2016 (15) | 2020 (9) | | | 19/28 | | | |
| 3 | Maica García | 1990 | Right | 27 | 2012 (7) | 2016 (11) | 2020 (9) | | | 21/30 | | | |
| 4 | Beatriz Ortiz | 1995 | Right | 23 | 2016 (5) | 2020 (18) | | | | 21/26 | | | |
| 5 | Judith Forca | 1996 | Left | 21 | 2016 (7) | 2020 (14) | | | | 20/25 | | | |

- Official Results Books (PDF): 2012 (pp. 353–354), 2016 (pp. 206–207), 2020 (pp. 251–252).

=== United States ===
- Women's national team: United States
- Team appearances: 6 (2000–2020)
- As host team: —

* Number of goalscorers (40+ goals): 1

- Number of goalscorers (30–39 goals): 2
- Number of goalscorers (20–29 goals): 1
- Last updated: 12 August 2021.

Legend

- – Hosts

Female players with 20 or more goals at the Olympics
| Rk | Player | Birth | L/R | Total goals | Water polo tournaments (goals) | | | | | Age of first/last | ISHOF member | Note | Ref |
| Rk | Player | Birth | L/R | Total goals | 1 | 2 | 3 | 4 | 5 | Age of first/last | ISHOF member | Note | Ref |
|---|---|---|---|---|---|---|---|---|---|---|---|---|---|
| 1 | Maggie Steffens | 1993 | Right | 56 | 2012 (21) | 2016 (17) | 2020 (18) | | | 19/28 | | | |
| 2 | Brenda Villa | 1980 | Right | 31 | 2000 (9) | 2004 (7) | 2008 (9) | 2012 (6) | | 20/32 | 2018 | | |
| 3 | Maddie Musselman | 1998 | Right | 30 | 2016 (12) | 2020 (18) | | | | 18/23 | | | |
| 4 | Makenzie Fischer | 1997 | Right | 21 | 2016 (7) | 2020 (14) | | | | 19/24 | | | |

- Official Results Books (PDF): 2000 (p. 101), 2004 (pp. 84–85), 2008 (pp. 77–78), 2012 (pp. 368–369), 2016 (pp. 218–219), 2020 (pp. 273–274).

== See also ==
- Water polo at the Summer Olympics
- Lists of Olympic water polo records and statistics
  - List of men's Olympic water polo tournament records and statistics
  - List of women's Olympic water polo tournament records and statistics
  - List of Olympic champions in men's water polo
  - List of Olympic champions in women's water polo
  - National team appearances in the men's Olympic water polo tournament
  - National team appearances in the women's Olympic water polo tournament
  - List of players who have appeared in multiple men's Olympic water polo tournaments
  - List of players who have appeared in multiple women's Olympic water polo tournaments
  - List of Olympic medalists in water polo (men)
  - List of Olympic medalists in water polo (women)
  - List of men's Olympic water polo tournament top goalscorers
  - List of men's Olympic water polo tournament goalkeepers
  - List of women's Olympic water polo tournament goalkeepers
  - List of Olympic venues in water polo

== Sources ==
=== Official Results Books (IOC) ===
PDF documents in the LA84 Foundation Digital Library:

- Official Results Book – 2000 Olympic Games – Water Polo (download, archive)
- Official Results Book – 2004 Olympic Games – Water Polo (download, archive)
- Official Results Book – 2008 Olympic Games – Water Polo (download, archive)

PDF documents on the FINA website:

- Official Results Book – 2012 Olympic Games – Diving, Swimming, Synchronised Swimming, Water Polo (archive) (pp. 284–507)

PDF documents in the Olympic World Library:

- Official Results Book – 2016 Olympic Games – Water Polo (archive)

PDF documents on the International Olympic Committee website:

- Official Results Book – 2020 Olympic Games – Water Polo (archive)
- Official Results Book – 2024 Olympic Games – Water Polo

=== Official Reports (FINA) ===
PDF documents on the FINA website:

- HistoFINA – Water polo medalists and statistics (as of September 2019) (archive) (p. 56)
- 1870–2020 | 150 years of Water Polo – Evolution of its rules (archive)

=== Official website (IOC) ===
Water polo on the International Olympic Committee website:

- Water polo
- Women's water polo

=== Olympedia ===
Water polo on the Olympedia website:

- Water polo
- Women's water polo
- Athlete count for water polo
- Water polo venues
- Water polo at the 2000 Summer Olympics (women's tournament)
- Water polo at the 2004 Summer Olympics (women's tournament)
- Water polo at the 2008 Summer Olympics (women's tournament)
- Water polo at the 2012 Summer Olympics (women's tournament)
- Water polo at the 2016 Summer Olympics (women's tournament)
- Water polo at the 2020 Summer Olympics (women's tournament)

=== Sports Reference ===
Water polo on the Sports Reference website:

- Country Medal Leaders & Athlete Medal Leaders (1900–2016) (archived)
- Women's water polo (2000–2016) (archived)
- Water polo at the 2000 Summer Games (women's tournament) (archived)
- Water polo at the 2004 Summer Games (women's tournament) (archived)
- Water polo at the 2008 Summer Games (women's tournament) (archived)
- Water polo at the 2012 Summer Games (women's tournament) (archived)
- Water polo at the 2016 Summer Games (women's tournament) (archived)

=== Todor66 ===
Water polo on the Todor66 website:

- Water polo at the Summer Games
- Water polo at the 2000 Summer Olympics (women's tournament, women's qualification)
- Water polo at the 2004 Summer Olympics (women's tournament, women's qualification)
- Water polo at the 2008 Summer Olympics (women's tournament, women's qualification)
- Water polo at the 2012 Summer Olympics (women's tournament, women's qualification)
- Water polo at the 2016 Summer Olympics (women's tournament, women's qualification)
- Water polo at the 2020 Summer Olympics (women's tournament, women's qualification)

=== ISHOF ===
International Swimming Hall of Fame (ISHOF) website:

- Honorees Listed by Category – Water Polo
- Honorees Listed by Category – Coaches
- Honorees Listed by Category – Contributors
- Honorees by Country
- Honorees By Last Name
