= Water polo at the 2009 World Aquatics Championships – Women's tournament =

The women's water polo tournament at the 2009 World Aquatics Championships, organised by the FINA, was held in Rome, Italy from 19 to 31 July 2009.

== Teams ==
Africa	Americas	Asia	Europe	Oceania
South Africa	Brazil; Canada; United States	China; Kazakhstan; Uzbekistan	Germany; Greece; Hungary; Italy; Netherlands; Russia; Spain	Australia; New Zealand

== Preliminary round ==
All times are Central European Summer Time (UTC+2)

Qualified for the quarterfinals
Qualified for the eightfinals
Will play for places 13-16

=== Tie-breaking criteria ===
If two teams shall have equal points, further classification shall be established as follows:

1. The team winning the game between them shall be placed higher.
2. If the game between them was tied, then the results against the highest placed team(s) in the group shall be considered.
3. The first comparison shall be based on goal difference, and if still tied, then based on goals scored.
4. The comparison shall be made first compared to the highest placed team (or teams, if tied) in the group.
5. If still tied, the results against the next highest placed team (or teams, if tied) shall be used in succession until all results have been considered.
6. If still tied, the teams shall shoot penalty shots to determine which team shall be placed higher. Each team shall nominate five players and a goalkeeper who will participate in the penalty shoot out. The team shall shoot five penalty shots at the goal of the other team, alternating shots. If a tie exists after each team has taken five shots, then teams shall take sets of alternate shots until one team scores and the other does not. The procedure shall be conducted following the final game of the round or at the first practical opportunity.

If there is more than one tie in a group, the highest placed tie shall be determined first.

If three or more teams shall have equal points, further classification shall be established as follows:

1. The results among the tied teams shall determine which team is placed highest.
2. If, at any time during the application of the procedure set out in this paragraph, the highest placed team is determined and the number of tied teams is reduced to two, then the above paragraph shall be used to determine which of the two remaining teams is placed higher.
3. The comparison shall be made first, upon the points of the games among the tied teams, second, the goal difference, and third, based upon goals scored.
4. If still tied, the games played against the highest placed team (or teams, if tied) shall be considered.
5. The first comparison shall be based on goal difference, and if still tied, then based on goals scored.
6. If still tied, the results against the next highest placed team (or teams, if tied) shall be used in succession until all results have been considered.
7. If still tied, the teams shall shoot penalty shots to determine which team shall be placed highest. Each team shall nominate five players and a goalkeeper who will participate in the penalty shoot out. Each team shall shoot five penalty shots at its opponent’s goal in alternate succession. The first team shall take its first penalty shot and then each other team shall take its first penalty shot, etc. If a tie shall exist after that procedure, the teams shall then take sets of alternate shots until one team misses and the other(s) score. The procedure shall be conducted following the final game of the round or at the first practical opportunity.

If there is more than one tie in a group, the highest placed tie shall be determined first.

Source: "CODE OF CONDUCT – BL 9.6.3 Tie Breaking". FINA.

=== Group A ===
Pos	Team	Pld	W	D	L	GF	GA	GD	Pts
1	Hungary	3	3	0	0	36	17	+19	6
2	Italy	3	2	0	1	36	21	+15	4
3	China	3	1	0	2	45	27	+18	2
4	Uzbekistan	3	0	0	3	14	66	−52	0

July 19, 2009; 09:30	Match 1	China	7–10	Hungary	Attendance: 300; Referees: Reemnet (NED), Stavropoulos (GRE)
July 19, 2009; 09:30	Match 1	Score by quarters: 2-2, 2-5, 1-3, 2-0			Attendance: 300; Referees: Reemnet (NED), Stavropoulos (GRE)
July 19, 2009; 09:30	Match 1	Sun YJ, Wang Yi, Ma 2	Goals	Drávucz 3	Attendance: 300; Referees: Reemnet (NED), Stavropoulos (GRE)

July 19, 2009; 19:00	Match 8	Uzbekistan	3–20	Italy	Attendance: 1,300; Referees: Ciric (SRB), Spiegel (GER)
July 19, 2009; 19:00	Match 8	Score by quarters: 1-2, 0-6, 0-8, 2-4			Attendance: 1,300; Referees: Ciric (SRB), Spiegel (GER)
July 19, 2009; 19:00	Match 8	Plyusova 2	Goals	di Mario 4	Attendance: 1,300; Referees: Ciric (SRB), Spiegel (GER)

July 21, 2009; 19:40	Match 15	Uzbekistan	6–28	China	Attendance: 800; Referees: Sadekov (RUS), Moner (EGY)
July 21, 2009; 19:40	Match 15	Score by quarters: 1-7, 4-7, 0-10, 1-4			Attendance: 800; Referees: Sadekov (RUS), Moner (EGY)
July 21, 2009; 19:40	Match 15	Plyusova 3	Goals	Sun YJ, Sun Y 5	Attendance: 800; Referees: Sadekov (RUS), Moner (EGY)

July 21, 2009; 21:00	Match 16	Hungary	8–5	Italy	Attendance: 2,800; Referees: Turcotte (CAN), Matache (ROU)
July 21, 2009; 21:00	Match 16	Score by quarters: 1-2, 2-2', 2-1, 3-0			Attendance: 2,800; Referees: Turcotte (CAN), Matache (ROU)
July 21, 2009; 21:00	Match 16	Pelle 2	Goals	Bianconi 2	Attendance: 2,800; Referees: Turcotte (CAN), Matache (ROU)

July 23, 2009; 17:00	Match 21	Uzbekistan	5–18	Hungary	Attendance: 300; Referees: Knights (NZL), Moner (EGY)
July 23, 2009; 17:00	Match 21	Score by quarters: 2-4, 0-3, 0-4, 3-7			Attendance: 300; Referees: Knights (NZL), Moner (EGY)
July 23, 2009; 17:00	Match 21	Gorodchanina, Plyusova 2	Goals	Brávik 4	Attendance: 300; Referees: Knights (NZL), Moner (EGY)

July 23, 2009; 21:00	Match 24	China	10–11	Italy	Attendance: 3,700; Referees: Margeta (SLO), Wengenroth (SUI)
July 23, 2009; 21:00	Match 24	Score by quarters: 3-4, 3-3, 4-3, 0-1			Attendance: 3,700; Referees: Margeta (SLO), Wengenroth (SUI)
July 23, 2009; 21:00	Match 24	Sun Y 3	Goals	Casanova 3	Attendance: 3,700; Referees: Margeta (SLO), Wengenroth (SUI)

=== Group B ===
Pos	Team	Pld	W	D	L	GF	GA	GD	Pts
1	Russia	3	3	0	0	48	23	+25	6
2	United States	3	2	0	1	41	25	+16	4
3	Greece	3	1	0	2	29	32	−3	2
4	Kazakhstan	3	0	0	3	16	54	−38	0

July 19, 2009; 10:50	Match 2	Russia	14–9	Greece	Referees: Gomez (ITA), Wengenroth (SUI)
July 19, 2009; 10:50	Match 2	Score by quarters: 3-1, 4-1, 4-5, 3-2			Referees: Gomez (ITA), Wengenroth (SUI)
July 19, 2009; 10:50	Match 2	Pantyulina 4	Goals	Liosi 4	Referees: Gomez (ITA), Wengenroth (SUI)

July 19, 2009; 12:10	Match 3	United States	19–6	Kazakhstan	Referees: Flahive (AUS), Shiwei (CHN)
July 19, 2009; 12:10	Match 3	Score by quarters: 3-4, 6-1, 6-0, 4-1			Referees: Flahive (AUS), Shiwei (CHN)
July 19, 2009; 12:10	Match 3	Craig 4	Goals	six players 1	Referees: Flahive (AUS), Shiwei (CHN)

July 21, 2009; 09:30	Match 9	Kazakhstan	6–12	Greece	Attendance: 150; Referees: Reemnet (NED), Ghafouri (IRI)
July 21, 2009; 09:30	Match 9	Score by quarters: 4-4, 0-3, 1-2, 1-3			Attendance: 150; Referees: Reemnet (NED), Ghafouri (IRI)
July 21, 2009; 09:30	Match 9	Gritsenko 2	Goals	Roumpesi, Gerolimou 3	Attendance: 150; Referees: Reemnet (NED), Ghafouri (IRI)

July 21, 2009; 10:50	Match 10	Russia	11–10	United States	Attendance: 300; Referees: Margeta (SLO), Patelli (BRA)
July 21, 2009; 10:50	Match 10	Score by quarters: 4-4, 1-3, 4-3, 2-0			Attendance: 300; Referees: Margeta (SLO), Patelli (BRA)
July 21, 2009; 10:50	Match 10	Vylegzhanina, Pantyulina 4	Goals	van Norman, Craig 2	Attendance: 300; Referees: Margeta (SLO), Patelli (BRA)

July 23, 2009; 18:20	Match 22	Russia	23–4	Kazakhstan	Attendance: 400; Referees: Stavropoulos (GRE), Ghafouri (IRI)
July 23, 2009; 18:20	Match 22	Score by quarters: 4-1, 6-1, 6-1, 7-1			Attendance: 400; Referees: Stavropoulos (GRE), Ghafouri (IRI)
July 23, 2009; 18:20	Match 22	Konukh, Belyaeva 4	Goals	Gritsenko 2	Attendance: 400; Referees: Stavropoulos (GRE), Ghafouri (IRI)

July 23, 2009; 19:40	Match 23	United States	12–8	Greece	Attendance: 700; Referees: Gomez (ITA), Matache (ROU)
July 23, 2009; 19:40	Match 23	Score by quarters: 1-1, 3-0, 4-3, 4-4			Attendance: 700; Referees: Gomez (ITA), Matache (ROU)
July 23, 2009; 19:40	Match 23	Rulon, Gregorka 3	Goals	Asimaki, Gerolimou 2	Attendance: 700; Referees: Gomez (ITA), Matache (ROU)

=== Group C ===
Pos	Team	Pld	W	D	L	GF	GA	GD	Pts
1	Australia	3	2	1	0	43	12	+31	5
2	Canada	3	2	1	0	38	17	+21	5
3	New Zealand	3	1	0	2	22	31	−9	2
4	South Africa	3	0	0	3	12	55	−43	0

July 19, 2009; 13:30	Match 4	New Zealand	12–5	South Africa	Referees: Patelli (BRA), Rotsart (USA)
July 19, 2009; 13:30	Match 4	Score by quarters: 1-2, 5-0, 3-0, 3-3			Referees: Patelli (BRA), Rotsart (USA)
July 19, 2009; 13:30	Match 4	Mason 3	Goals	Harris 3	Referees: Patelli (BRA), Rotsart (USA)

July 19, 2009; 15:00	Match 5	Canada	6–6	Australia	Attendance: 200; Referees: Borrell (ESP), Sadekov (RUS)
July 19, 2009; 15:00	Match 5	Score by quarters: 0-1, 2-3, 3-1, 1-1			Attendance: 200; Referees: Borrell (ESP), Sadekov (RUS)
July 19, 2009; 15:00	Match 5	Perreault 2	Goals	Webster 2	Attendance: 200; Referees: Borrell (ESP), Sadekov (RUS)

July 21, 2009; 12:10	Match 11	Australia	23–2	South Africa	Attendance: 300; Referees: Koganov (AZE), Mernenko (UZB)
July 21, 2009; 12:10	Match 11	Score by quarters: 4-1, 8-1, 6-0, 5-0			Attendance: 300; Referees: Koganov (AZE), Mernenko (UZB)
July 21, 2009; 12:10	Match 11	Knox, Zagame 5	Goals	Harris 2	Attendance: 300; Referees: Koganov (AZE), Mernenko (UZB)

July 21, 2009; 13:30	Match 12	New Zealand	6–12	Canada	Attendance: 200; Referees: Spiegel (GER), Shiwei (CHN)
July 21, 2009; 13:30	Match 12	Score by quarters: 1-2, 1-1, 3-4, 1-5			Attendance: 200; Referees: Spiegel (GER), Shiwei (CHN)
July 21, 2009; 13:30	Match 12	Mason 3	Goals	Tomiuk, Perreault 3	Attendance: 200; Referees: Spiegel (GER), Shiwei (CHN)

July 23, 2009; 09:30	Match 17	New Zealand	4–14	Australia	Attendance: 200; Referees: Ciric (SRB), Patelli (BRA)
July 23, 2009; 09:30	Match 17	Score by quarters: 2-3, 2-4, 0-2, 0-5			Attendance: 200; Referees: Ciric (SRB), Patelli (BRA)
July 23, 2009; 09:30	Match 17	Hudson 3	Goals	Rippon, Knox, Webster 3	Attendance: 200; Referees: Ciric (SRB), Patelli (BRA)

July 23, 2009; 10:50	Match 18	Canada	20–5	South Africa	Attendance: 200; Referees: Reemnet (NED), Spiegel (GER)
July 23, 2009; 10:50	Match 18	Score by quarters: 3-3, 6-1, 6-0, 5-1			Attendance: 200; Referees: Reemnet (NED), Spiegel (GER)
July 23, 2009; 10:50	Match 18	Genoway 6	Goals	Heydenrych 2	Attendance: 200; Referees: Reemnet (NED), Spiegel (GER)

=== Group D ===
Pos	Team	Pld	W	D	L	GF	GA	GD	Pts
1	Spain	3	2	1	0	44	33	+11	5
2	Netherlands	3	2	1	0	34	28	+6	5
3	Germany	3	0	1	2	30	37	−7	1
4	Brazil	3	0	1	2	25	35	−10	1

July 19, 2009; 16:20	Match 6	Germany	12–17	Spain	Attendance: 700; Referees: Tulga (TUR), Pinker (RSA)
July 19, 2009; 16:20	Match 6	Score by quarters: 3-4, 3-1, 3-6, 3-6			Attendance: 700; Referees: Tulga (TUR), Pinker (RSA)
July 19, 2009; 16:20	Match 6	Dierolf 6	Goals	Gil 7	Attendance: 700; Referees: Tulga (TUR), Pinker (RSA)

July 19, 2009; 17:40	Match 7	Brazil	7–11	Netherlands	Attendance: 1,000; Referees: Turcotte (CAN), Matache (ROU)
July 19, 2009; 17:40	Match 7	Score by quarters: 3-3, 1-3, 2-5, 1-0			Attendance: 1,000; Referees: Turcotte (CAN), Matache (ROU)
July 19, 2009; 17:40	Match 7	Pedrosa 5	Goals	van Belkum 4	Attendance: 1,000; Referees: Turcotte (CAN), Matache (ROU)

July 21, 2009; 17:00	Match 13	Netherlands	15–15	Spain	Attendance: 500; Referees: Wengenroth (SUI), Rotsart (USA)
July 21, 2009; 17:00	Match 13	Score by quarters: 4-6, 3-2, 3-4, 5-3			Attendance: 500; Referees: Wengenroth (SUI), Rotsart (USA)
July 21, 2009; 17:00	Match 13	van Belkum 7	Goals	Pareja 4	Attendance: 500; Referees: Wengenroth (SUI), Rotsart (USA)

July 21, 2009; 18:20	Match 14	Germany	12–12	Brazil	Attendance: 600; Referees: Balfanbayev (KAZ), Flahive (AUS)
July 21, 2009; 18:20	Match 14	Score by quarters: 2-5, 4-2, 4-2, 2-3			Attendance: 600; Referees: Balfanbayev (KAZ), Flahive (AUS)
July 21, 2009; 18:20	Match 14	Blomenkamp, Zöllner 3	Goals	Pedrosa, Teno 3	Attendance: 600; Referees: Balfanbayev (KAZ), Flahive (AUS)

July 23, 2009; 12:10	Match 19	Germany	6–8	Netherlands	Attendance: 200; Referees: Sadekov (RUS), Peris (CRO)
July 23, 2009; 12:10	Match 19	Score by quarters: 0-4, 1-0, 3-3, 2-1			Attendance: 200; Referees: Sadekov (RUS), Peris (CRO)
July 23, 2009; 12:10	Match 19	Kern, Zöllner 2	Goals	van Belkum 4	Attendance: 200; Referees: Sadekov (RUS), Peris (CRO)

July 23, 2009; 13:30	Match 20	Brazil	6–12	Spain	Attendance: 200; Referees: Shiwei (CHN), Pinker (RSA)
July 23, 2009; 13:30	Match 20	Score by quarters: 2-5, 1-2, 1-3, 2-2			Attendance: 200; Referees: Shiwei (CHN), Pinker (RSA)
July 23, 2009; 13:30	Match 20	Teno 3	Goals	Gil, Pareja 3	Attendance: 200; Referees: Shiwei (CHN), Pinker (RSA)

== Final round ==
=== Brackets ===
Play-off; July 25, 2009
Canada	13
Germany	7
New Zealand	7
Netherlands	9
Italy	9
Greece	10
China	9
United States	12

Quarterfinals; July 27, 2009
Hungary	7
Canada	9
Russia	9
Netherlands	7
Australia	3
Greece	4
Spain	6
United States	9

Semifinals; July 29, 2009
Canada	8
Russia	7
Greece	7
United States	8

Final; July 31, 2009
Canada	6
United States	7
Third place
Russia	10
Greece	9

5th-8th Place

5th-8th Place
July 29, 2009 – 11:40
Hungary	9
Netherlands	10
July 29, 2009 – 15:30
Australia	7
Spain	6

5th/6th Place
July 31, 2009 – 10:40
Netherlands	12
Australia	11
7th/8th Place
July 31, 2009 – 09:00
Hungary	11
Spain	6

9th-12th Place

9th-12th Place
July 27, 2009 – 11:20
Italy	9
China	5
July 27, 2009 – 12:40
Germany	8
New Zealand	7

9th/10th Place
July 29, 2009 – 10:20
Italy	12
Germany	3
11th/12th Place
July 29, 2009 – 09:00
China	16
New Zealand	9

13th-16th Place

13th-16th Place
July 25, 2009 – 09:00
Uzbekistan	4
Kazakhstan	16
July 25, 2009 – 10:20
South Africa	2
Brazil	16

13th/14th Place
July 27, 2009 – 10:00
Kazakhstan	8
Brazil (PSO)	11
15th/16th Place
July 27, 2009 – 08:40
Uzbekistan	16
South Africa	9

=== Semifinals 13-16 places ===
July 25, 2009; 09:00	Match 25	Uzbekistan	4–16	Kazakhstan	Attendance: 150; Referees: Moner (EGY), Damcevski (MKD)
July 25, 2009; 09:00	Match 25	Score by quarters: 0-5, 1-4, 1-3, 2-4			Attendance: 150; Referees: Moner (EGY), Damcevski (MKD)
July 25, 2009; 09:00	Match 25	Gorodchanina 2	Goals	Akilbayeva 5	Attendance: 150; Referees: Moner (EGY), Damcevski (MKD)

July 25, 2009; 10:20	Match 26	South Africa	2–16	Brazil	Attendance: 250; Referees: Gafouri (IRI), Knights (NZL)
July 25, 2009; 10:20	Match 26	Score by quarters: 1-7, 0-2, 1-3, 0-4			Attendance: 250; Referees: Gafouri (IRI), Knights (NZL)
July 25, 2009; 10:20	Match 26	Harris 2	Goals	Pedrosa 6	Attendance: 250; Referees: Gafouri (IRI), Knights (NZL)

=== Eightfinals ===
July 25, 2009; 11:40	Match 28	China	9–12	United States	Attendance: 350; Referees: Gomez (ESP), Kiszelly (HUN)
July 25, 2009; 11:40	Match 28	Score by quarters: 2-4, 3-3, 2-3, 2-2			Attendance: 350; Referees: Gomez (ESP), Kiszelly (HUN)
July 25, 2009; 11:40	Match 28	Gao 5	Goals	Petri, Rulon 3	Attendance: 350; Referees: Gomez (ESP), Kiszelly (HUN)

July 25, 2009; 15:30	Match 29	Canada	13–7	Germany	Attendance: 500; Referees: Flahive (AUS), Balfanbayev (KAZ)
July 25, 2009; 15:30	Match 29	Score by quarters: 4-1, 4-2, 3-2, 2-2			Attendance: 500; Referees: Flahive (AUS), Balfanbayev (KAZ)
July 25, 2009; 15:30	Match 29	Perreault 4	Goals	Dierolf, Wengst 2	Attendance: 500; Referees: Flahive (AUS), Balfanbayev (KAZ)

July 25, 2009; 16:50	Match 30	New Zealand	7–9	Netherlands	Attendance: 500; Referees: Brguljan (MNE), Pinker (RSA)
July 25, 2009; 16:50	Match 30	Score by quarters: 2-1, 0-2, 4-2, 1-4			Attendance: 500; Referees: Brguljan (MNE), Pinker (RSA)
July 25, 2009; 16:50	Match 30	Mason, Smith 2	Goals	Cabout 3	Attendance: 500; Referees: Brguljan (MNE), Pinker (RSA)

July 25, 2009; 21:00	Match 27	Italy	9–10	Greece	Attendance: 3,000; Referees: Koganov (KAZ), Borrell (ESP)
July 25, 2009; 21:00	Match 27	Score by quarters: 4-4, 2-1, 3-4, 0-1			Attendance: 3,000; Referees: Koganov (KAZ), Borrell (ESP)
July 25, 2009; 21:00	Match 27	four players 2	Goals	Antonakou 3	Attendance: 3,000; Referees: Koganov (KAZ), Borrell (ESP)

=== 15th Place ===
July 27, 2009; 08:40	Match 31	Uzbekistan	16–9	South Africa	Attendance: 50; Referees: Reemnet (NDL), Knights (NZL)
July 27, 2009; 08:40	Match 31	Score by quarters: 4-4, 5-1, 2-2, 5-2			Attendance: 50; Referees: Reemnet (NDL), Knights (NZL)
July 27, 2009; 08:40	Match 31	Halikova 5	Goals	three players 2	Attendance: 50; Referees: Reemnet (NDL), Knights (NZL)

=== 13th Place ===
July 27, 2009; 10:00	Match 32	Kazakhstan	8–11 (OT)	Brazil	Attendance: 200; Referees: Damcevski (MKD), Shiw (CHN)
July 27, 2009; 10:00	Match 32	Score by quarters: 2-1, 0-2, 3-2, 1-1 OT: 0-0, 1-1, PSO: 1-4			Attendance: 200; Referees: Damcevski (MKD), Shiw (CHN)
July 27, 2009; 10:00	Match 32	Rybachek 2	Goals	Fernandes, Mar. Canetti 3	Attendance: 200; Referees: Damcevski (MKD), Shiw (CHN)

=== Semifinals 9-12 places ===
July 27, 2009; 11:20	Match 34	Germany	8–7	New Zealand	Attendance: 500; Referees: Sadekov (RUS), Ghafouri (IRI)
July 27, 2009; 11:20	Match 34	Score by quarters: 2-3, 1-2, 1-0, 4-2			Attendance: 500; Referees: Sadekov (RUS), Ghafouri (IRI)
July 27, 2009; 11:20	Match 34	Zöllner 3	Goals	Hudson 3	Attendance: 500; Referees: Sadekov (RUS), Ghafouri (IRI)

July 27, 2009; 12:40	Match 33	Italy	9–5	China	Attendance: 500; Referees: Turcotte (CAN), Rotsart (USA)
July 27, 2009; 12:40	Match 33	Score by quarters: 1-2, 4-1, 0-0, 4-2			Attendance: 500; Referees: Turcotte (CAN), Rotsart (USA)
July 27, 2009; 12:40	Match 33	di Mario 4	Goals	Ma 2	Attendance: 500; Referees: Turcotte (CAN), Rotsart (USA)

=== Quarterfinals ===
July 27, 2009; 14:00	Match 35	Hungary	7–9	Canada	Attendance: 500; Referees: Margeta (SLO), Patelli (BRA)
July 27, 2009; 14:00	Match 35	Score by quarters: 2-2, 2-2, 1-3, 2-2			Attendance: 500; Referees: Margeta (SLO), Patelli (BRA)
July 27, 2009; 14:00	Match 35	Szűcs, Drávucz 2	Goals	Perreault 3	Attendance: 500; Referees: Margeta (SLO), Patelli (BRA)

July 27, 2009; 15:20	Match 36	Russia	9–7	Netherlands	Attendance: 600; Referees: Koganov (KAZ), Wengenroht (SUI)
July 27, 2009; 15:20	Match 36	Score by quarters: 2-1, 2-2, 3-1, 2-3			Attendance: 600; Referees: Koganov (KAZ), Wengenroht (SUI)
July 27, 2009; 15:20	Match 36	three players 2	Goals	van Belkum 3	Attendance: 600; Referees: Koganov (KAZ), Wengenroht (SUI)

July 27, 2009; 16:40	Match 37	Australia	3–4	Greece	Attendance: 500; Referees: Peris (CRO), Matache (ROU)
July 27, 2009; 16:40	Match 37	Score by quarters: 1-2, 0-1, 1-0, 1-1			Attendance: 500; Referees: Peris (CRO), Matache (ROU)
July 27, 2009; 16:40	Match 37	Gynther 3	Goals	Gerolimou 4	Attendance: 500; Referees: Peris (CRO), Matache (ROU)

July 27, 2009; 21:00	Match 38	Spain	6–9	United States	Attendance: 1.000; Referees: Balfanbayev (KAZ), Brguljan (MNE)
July 27, 2009; 21:00	Match 38	Score by quarters: 3-2, 0-3, 1-2, 2-2			Attendance: 1.000; Referees: Balfanbayev (KAZ), Brguljan (MNE)
July 27, 2009; 21:00	Match 38	Gil, Garcia 2	Goals	Hayes 3	Attendance: 1.000; Referees: Balfanbayev (KAZ), Brguljan (MNE)

=== 11th Place ===
July 29, 2009; 09:00	Match 39	China	16–9	New Zealand	Attendance: 100; Referees: Pinker (RSA), Mernenko (UZB)
July 29, 2009; 09:00	Match 39	Score by quarters: 4-2, 5-2, 2-2, 5-3			Attendance: 100; Referees: Pinker (RSA), Mernenko (UZB)
July 29, 2009; 09:00	Match 39	Sun Y. 5	Goals	Hudson 3	Attendance: 100; Referees: Pinker (RSA), Mernenko (UZB)

=== 9th Place ===
July 29, 2009; 10:20	Match 40	Italy	12–3	Germany	Attendance: 400; Referees: Reemnet (NED), Damcevski (MKD)
July 29, 2009; 10:20	Match 40	Score by quarters: 3-1, 2-1, 3-1, 4-0			Attendance: 400; Referees: Reemnet (NED), Damcevski (MKD)
July 29, 2009; 10:20	Match 40	Bianconi 4	Goals	three players 1	Attendance: 400; Referees: Reemnet (NED), Damcevski (MKD)

=== Semifinals 5-8 places ===
July 29, 2009; 11:40	Match 41	Hungary	9–10	Netherlands	Attendance: 300; Referees: Rotsart (USA), Stavropoulos (GRE)
July 29, 2009; 11:40	Match 41	Score by quarters: 1-3, 1-2, 5-1, 2-4			Attendance: 300; Referees: Rotsart (USA), Stavropoulos (GRE)
July 29, 2009; 11:40	Match 41	three players 2	Goals	Cabout 3	Attendance: 300; Referees: Rotsart (USA), Stavropoulos (GRE)

July 29, 2009; 15:30	Match 42	Australia	7–6	Spain	Attendance: 700; Referees: Spiegel (GER), Balfanbayev (KAZ)
July 29, 2009; 15:30	Match 42	Score by quarters: 3-0, 2-2, 1-2, 1-2			Attendance: 700; Referees: Spiegel (GER), Balfanbayev (KAZ)
July 29, 2009; 15:30	Match 42	Moran 2	Goals	Lopez-Escribano, López 2	Attendance: 700; Referees: Spiegel (GER), Balfanbayev (KAZ)

=== Semifinals ===
July 29, 2009; 16:50	Match 43	Canada	8–7	Russia	Attendance: 600; Referees: Kiszelly (HUN), Tulga (TUR)
July 29, 2009; 16:50	Match 43	Score by quarters: 3-1, 1-1, 1-3, 3-2			Attendance: 600; Referees: Kiszelly (HUN), Tulga (TUR)
July 29, 2009; 16:50	Match 43	Csikos 3	Goals	Ivanova 2	Attendance: 600; Referees: Kiszelly (HUN), Tulga (TUR)

July 29, 2009; 21:00	Match 44	Greece	7–8	United States	Attendance: 1,900; Referees: Patelli (BRA), Borrell (ESP)
July 29, 2009; 21:00	Match 44	Score by quarters: 2-3, 1-2, 2-1, 2-2			Attendance: 1,900; Referees: Patelli (BRA), Borrell (ESP)
July 29, 2009; 21:00	Match 44	Asimaki 3	Goals	Windes 5	Attendance: 1,900; Referees: Patelli (BRA), Borrell (ESP)

=== 7th Place ===
July 31, 2009; 09:00	Match 45	Hungary	11–6	Spain	Attendance: 250; Referees: Flahive (AUS), Shiwei (CHN)
July 31, 2009; 09:00	Match 45	Score by quarters: 4-3, 3-1, 3-1, 1-1			Attendance: 250; Referees: Flahive (AUS), Shiwei (CHN)
July 31, 2009; 09:00	Match 45	Drávucz 4	Goals	Pareja 2	Attendance: 250; Referees: Flahive (AUS), Shiwei (CHN)

=== 5th Place ===
July 31, 2009; 10:40	Match 46	Netherlands	12–11	Australia	Attendance: 400; Referees: Spiegel (GER), Ciric (SRB)
July 31, 2009; 10:40	Match 46	Score by quarters: 3-3, 3-3, 2-3, 4-2			Attendance: 400; Referees: Spiegel (GER), Ciric (SRB)
July 31, 2009; 10:40	Match 46	Cabout 4	Goals	Knox 4	Attendance: 400; Referees: Spiegel (GER), Ciric (SRB)

=== Bronze medal match ===
July 31, 2009; 16:00	Match 47	Russia	10–9	Greece	Attendance: 800; Referees: Wengenroth (SUI), Rotsart (USA)
July 31, 2009; 16:00	Match 47	Score by quarters: 3-2, 2-2, 2-4, 3-1			Attendance: 800; Referees: Wengenroth (SUI), Rotsart (USA)
July 31, 2009; 16:00	Match 47	Prokofyeva 3	Goals	Asimaki, Gerolimou 3	Attendance: 800; Referees: Wengenroth (SUI), Rotsart (USA)

=== Gold Medal match ===
July 31, 2009; 21:00	Match 48	Canada	6–7	United States	Attendance: 3,000; Referees: Balfanbayev (KAZ), Tulga (TUR)
July 31, 2009; 21:00	Match 48	Score by quarters: 2-1, 2-4, 1-0, 1-2			Attendance: 3,000; Referees: Balfanbayev (KAZ), Tulga (TUR)
July 31, 2009; 21:00	Match 48	Csikos 4	Goals	Rulon 2	Attendance: 3,000; Referees: Balfanbayev (KAZ), Tulga (TUR)

Canada disputed the result, however fina rejected the proposal.

== Final ranking ==
RANK	TEAM
1st place, gold medalist(s)	United States
2nd place, silver medalist(s)	Canada
3rd place, bronze medalist(s)	Russia
4.	Greece
5.	Netherlands
6.	Australia
7.	Hungary
8.	Spain
9.	Italy
10.	Germany
11.	China
12.	New Zealand
13.	Brazil
14.	Kazakhstan
15.	Uzbekistan
16.	South Africa

2009 FINA Women's World champions

United States

== Medalists ==
Gold	Silver	Bronze
United States Elizabeth Armstrong; Heather Petri; Brittany Hayes; Brenda Villa; Lauren Wenger; Tanya Gandy; Kelly Rulon; Jessica Steffens; Elsie Windes; Alison Gregorka; Moriah van Norman; Kameryn Craig; Jaime Komer Head coach: Adam Krikorian	Canada Rachel Riddell; Krystina Alogbo; Katrina Monton; Emily Csikos; Joëlle Békhazi; Whitney Genoway; Rosanna Tomiuk; Dominique Perreault; Carmen Eggens; Christine Robinson; Tara Campbell; Marina Radu; Marissa Janssens Head coach: Patrick Oaten	Russia Evgeniya Protsenko; Nadezda Glyzina; Ekaterina Prokofyeva; Sofia Konukh; Alena Vylegzhanina; Natalya Ryzhova-Alenicheva; Ekaterina Pantyulina; Evgenia Soboleva; Anna Timofeeva; Olga Belyaeva; Evgenia Ivanova; Yulia Gaufler; Maria Kovtunovskaya Head coach: Aleksandr Kabanov
