= List of players who have appeared in multiple women's Olympic water polo tournaments =

This is a list of female players who have been named in the national water polo team squad in at least two or three Olympic tournaments since the inaugural official edition in 2000.

== Abbreviations ==
Apps	Appearances	Rk	Rank	Ref	Reference	ISHOF	International Swimming Hall of Fame
Pos	Playing position	FP	Field player	GK	Goalkeeper		
(C)	Captain	p.	page	pp.	pages		

== Overall multi-time Olympians ==
As of 2016, 22 female players have been named in the national water polo team squad in three or more women's Olympic tournaments.

=== By tournament ===
The following table is pre-sorted by edition of the Olympics (in ascending order), name of the team (in ascending order), name of the player (in ascending order), respectively. Last updated: 6 February 2021.

Legend and abbreviation

- Team^{*} – Host team

Year	Total	Five-time Olympian		Four-time Olympian		Three-time Olympian	
2000	0	—	0	—	0	—	0
2004	0	—	0	—	0	—	0
2008	4	—	0	—	0	Russia: Sofia Konukh, Elena Smurova; United States: Heather Petri, Brenda Villa	4
2012	9	—	0	Russia: Sofia Konukh; United States: Heather Petri, Brenda Villa	3	Australia: Kate Gynther, Melissa Rippon; Hungary: Rita Drávucz; Italy: Tania Di Mario, Elena Gigli (GK), Anikó Pelle	6
2016	13	—	0	Italy: Tania Di Mario	1	Australia: Gemma Beadsworth, Bronwen Knox; China: Ma Huanhuan, Sun Yating, Yang Jun (GK); Hungary: Orsolya Takács; Italy: Teresa Frassinetti; Russia: Nadezhda Glyzina, Ekaterina Lisunova, Ekaterina Prokofyeva, Evgenia Soboleva; United States: Kami Craig	12
2020							
Year	Total	Five-time Olympian		Four-time Olympian		Three-time Olympian	

=== By confederation ===
Last updated: 24 January 2021.

Confederation	Number of multi-time Olympians			
Confederation	Five-time	Four-time	Three-time	Total
Africa – CANA	0	0	0	0
Americas – UANA	0	2	1	3
Asia – AASF	0	0	3	3
Europe – LEN	0	2	10	12
Oceania – OSA	0	0	4	4
Total	0	4	18	22

=== By team ===
Last updated: 24 January 2021.

Women's team	Number of multi-time Olympians				Confederation
Women's team	Five-time	Four-time	Three-time	Total	Confederation
Australia	0	0	4	4	Oceania – OSA
China	0	0	3	3	Asia – AASF
Hungary	0	0	2	2	Europe – LEN
Italy	0	1	3	4	Europe – LEN
Russia	0	1	5	6	Europe – LEN
United States	0	2	1	3	Americas – UANA
Total	0	4	18	22	

=== By position ===
Last updated: 24 January 2021.

Position	Number of multi-time Olympians			
Position	Five-time	Four-time	Three-time	Total
Field player	0	4	16	20
Goalkeeper	0	0	2	2
Total	0	4	18	22

=== Four-time Olympians ===
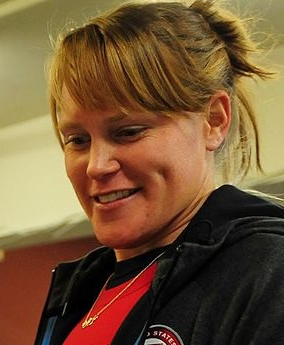
American water polo player Heather Petri competed at four Olympics (2000–2012).

The following table is pre-sorted by number of Olympic appearances (in descending order), year of the last Olympic appearance (in ascending order), year of the first Olympic appearance (in ascending order), date of birth (in ascending order), name of the player (in ascending order), respectively. Last updated: 7 August 2021.

Eight female athletes competed in water polo at four or more Olympic Games between 2000 and 2020 inclusive.

Legend

- – Hosts
- Apps – Appearances

Female athletes who competed in water polo at four or more Olympics
Apps	Player	Birth	Height	Women's team	Pos	Water polo tournaments					Period (age of first/last)	Medals				Ref
Apps	Player	Birth	Height	Women's team	Pos	1	2	3	4	5	Period (age of first/last)	G	S	B	T	Ref
4	Heather Petri	1978	1.80 m (5 ft 11 in)	United States	FP	2000	2004	2008	2012		12 years (22/34)	1	2	1	4	
4	Sofia Konukh	1980	1.73 m (5 ft 8 in)	Russia	FP	2000	2004	2008	2012		12 years (20/32)	0	0	1	1	
4	Brenda Villa	1980	1.63 m (5 ft 4 in)	United States	FP	2000	2004	2008	2012		12 years (20/32)	1	2	1	4	
4	Tania Di Mario	1979	1.68 m (5 ft 6 in)	Italy	FP	2004	2008	2012	2016		12 years (25/37)	1	1	0	2	
4	Bronwen Knox	1986	1.82 m (6 ft 0 in)	Australia	FP	2008	2012	2016	2020		13 years (22/35)	0	0	2	2	
4	Nadezhda Glyzina	1988	1.75 m (5 ft 9 in)	Russia	FP	2008	2012	2016			13 years (20/33)	0	0	1	1	
4	Nadezhda Glyzina	1988	1.75 m (5 ft 9 in)	ROC	FP				2020		13 years (20/33)	0	0	1	1	
4	Evgenia Soboleva	1988	1.80 m (5 ft 11 in)	Russia	FP	2008	2012	2016			13 years (19/32)	0	0	1	1	
4	Evgenia Soboleva	1988	1.80 m (5 ft 11 in)	ROC	FP				2020		13 years (19/32)	0	0	1	1	
4	Ekaterina Prokofyeva	1991	1.76 m (5 ft 9 in)	Russia	FP	2008	2012	2016			13 years (17/30)	0	0	1	1	
4	Ekaterina Prokofyeva	1991	1.76 m (5 ft 9 in)	ROC	FP				2020		13 years (17/30)	0	0	1	1	
Apps	Player	Birth	Height	Women's team	Pos	1	2	3	4	5	Period (age of first/last)	G	S	B	T	Ref
Apps	Player	Birth	Height	Women's team	Pos	Water polo tournaments					Period (age of first/last)	Medals				Ref

== Multi-time Olympians by team ==
The following tables are pre-sorted by number of Olympic appearances (in descending order), year of the last Olympic appearance (in ascending order), year of the first Olympic appearance (in ascending order), date of birth (in ascending order), name of the player (in ascending order), respectively.

Legend

- Year^{*} – As host team

=== Australia ===
- Women's national team: Australia
- Team appearances: 6 (2000^{*}–2020)
- As host team: 2000^{*}

* Number of four-time Olympians: 0

- Number of three-time Olympians: 4
- Last updated: 26 July 2021.

Legend

- – Hosts

Female athletes who competed in water polo at three or more Olympics
Apps	Player	Birth	Pos	Water polo tournaments					Age of first/last	ISHOF member	Note	Ref
Apps	Player	Birth	Pos	1	2	3	4	5	Age of first/last	ISHOF member	Note	Ref
3	Melissa Rippon	1981	FP	2004	2008	2012			23/31			
3	Kate Gynther	1982	FP	2004	2008	2012			22/30			
3	Bronwen Knox	1986	FP	2008	2012	2016			22/30			
3	Gemma Beadsworth	1987	FP	2008	2012	2016			21/29			

=== Brazil ===
- Women's national team: Brazil
- Team appearances: 1 (2016^{*})
- As host team: 2016^{*}
- Number of three-time Olympians: 0
- Number of two-time Olympians: 0
- Last updated: 24 January 2021.

=== Canada ===
- Women's national team: Canada
- Team appearances: 3 (2000–2004, 2020)
- As host team: —

* Number of three-time Olympians: 0

- Number of two-time Olympians: 8
- Last updated: 26 July 2021.

Female athletes who competed in water polo at two or more Olympics
Apps	Player	Birth	Pos	Water polo tournaments					Age of first/last	ISHOF member	Note	Ref
Apps	Player	Birth	Pos	1	2	3	4	5	Age of first/last	ISHOF member	Note	Ref
2	Ann Dow	1971	FP	2000	2004				29/33			
2	Johanne Bégin	1971	FP	2000	2004				28/32			
2	Cora Campbell	1974	FP	2000	2004				26/30			
2	Melissa Collins	1976	FP	2000	2004				23/27			
2	Marie Luc Arpin	1978	FP	2000	2004				22/26			
2	Jana Salat	1979	FP	2000	2004				21/25			
2	Susan Gardiner	1980	FP	2000	2004				20/24			
2	Valérie Dionne	1980	FP	2000	2004				20/24			

=== China ===
- Women's national team: China
- Team appearances: 4 (2008^{*}–2020)
- As host team: 2008^{*}

* Number of four-time Olympians: 0

- Number of three-time Olympians: 3
- Last updated: 26 July 2021.

Legend

- – Hosts

Female athletes who competed in water polo at three or more Olympics
Apps	Player	Birth	Pos	Water polo tournaments					Age of first/last	ISHOF member	Note	Ref
Apps	Player	Birth	Pos	1	2	3	4	5	Age of first/last	ISHOF member	Note	Ref
3	Sun Yating	1988	FP	2008	2012	2016			20/28			
3	Yang Jun	1988	GK	2008	2012	2016			20/28			
3	Ma Huanhuan	1990	FP	2008	2012	2016			18/26			

=== Great Britain ===
- Women's national team: Great Britain
- Team appearances: 1 (2012^{*})
- As host team: 2012^{*}
- Number of three-time Olympians: 0
- Number of two-time Olympians: 0
- Last updated: 24 January 2021.

=== Greece ===
- Women's national team: Greece
- Team appearances: 2 (2004^{*}–2008)
- As host team: 2004^{*}

* Number of three-time Olympians: 0

- Number of two-time Olympians: 7
- Last updated: 5 May 2021.

Legend

- – Hosts

Female athletes who competed in water polo at two or more Olympics
Apps	Player	Birth	Pos	Water polo tournaments					Age of first/last	ISHOF member	Note	Ref
Apps	Player	Birth	Pos	1	2	3	4	5	Age of first/last	ISHOF member	Note	Ref
2	Stavroula Kozompoli	1974	FP	2004	2008				30/34			
2	Georgia Ellinaki	1974	GK	2004	2008				30/34			
2	Evangelia Moraitidou	1975	FP	2004	2008				29/33			
2	Aikaterini Oikonomopoulou	1978	FP	2004	2008				26/30			
2	Kyriaki Liosi	1979	FP	2004	2008				24/28			
2	Georgia Lara	1980	FP	2004	2008				24/28			
2	Antigoni Roumpesi	1983	FP	2004	2008				21/25			

=== Hungary ===
- Women's national team: Hungary
- Team appearances: 5 (2004–2020)
- As host team: —

* Number of four-time Olympians: 0

- Number of three-time Olympians: 2
- Last updated: 26 July 2021.

Female athletes who competed in water polo at three or more Olympics
Apps	Player	Birth	Pos	Water polo tournaments					Age of first/last	ISHOF member	Note	Ref
Apps	Player	Birth	Pos	1	2	3	4	5	Age of first/last	ISHOF member	Note	Ref
3	Rita Drávucz	1980	FP	2004	2008	2012			24/32			
3	Orsolya Takács	1985	FP	2008	2012	2016			23/31			

Note:

- Three-time Olympian Anikó Pelle is listed in section Italy.

=== Italy ===
- Women's national team: Italy
- Team appearances: 4 (2004–2016)
- As host team: —

* Number of five-time Olympians: 0

- Number of four-time Olympians: 1
- Number of three-time Olympians: 3
- Last updated: 24 January 2021.

Abbreviation

- HUN – Hungary
- ITA – Italy

Female athletes who competed in water polo at three or more Olympics
Apps	Player	Birth	Pos	Water polo tournaments					Age of first/last	ISHOF member	Note	Ref
Apps	Player	Birth	Pos	1	2	3	4	5	Age of first/last	ISHOF member	Note	Ref
4	Tania Di Mario	1979	FP	2004	2008	2012	2016		25/37			
3	Anikó Pelle	1978	FP	2004; HUN	2008; HUN	2012; ITA			25/33			
3	Elena Gigli	1985	GK	2004	2008	2012			19/27			
3	Teresa Frassinetti	1985	FP	2008	2012	2016			22/30			

=== Japan ===
- Women's national team: Japan
- Team appearances: 1 (2020^{*})
- As host team: 2020^{*}
- Number of three-time Olympians: 0
- Number of two-time Olympians: 0
- Last updated: 26 July 2021.

=== Kazakhstan ===
- Women's national team: Kazakhstan
- Team appearances: 2 (2000–2004)
- As host team: —
- Number of four-time Olympians: 0
- Number of three-time Olympians: 0
- Last updated: 24 January 2021.

=== Netherlands ===
- Women's national team: Netherlands
- Team appearances: 3 (2000, 2008, 2020)
- As host team: —

* Number of three-time Olympians: 0

- Number of two-time Olympians: 2
- Last updated: 26 July 2021.

Female athletes who competed in water polo at two or more Olympics
Apps	Player	Birth	Pos	Water polo tournaments					Age of first/last	ISHOF member	Note	Ref
Apps	Player	Birth	Pos	1	2	3	4	5	Age of first/last	ISHOF member	Note	Ref
2	Gillian van den Berg	1971	FP	2000		2008			29/36			
2	Daniëlle de Bruijn	1978	FP	2000		2008			22/30			

=== Russia ===
- Women's national team: Russia
- Team appearances: 6 (2000–2020)
- As host team: —

* Number of five-time Olympians: 0

- Number of four-time Olympians: 1
- Number of three-time Olympians: 5
- Last updated: 26 July 2021.

Female athletes who competed in water polo at three or more Olympics
Apps	Player	Birth	Pos	Water polo tournaments					Age of first/last	ISHOF member	Note	Ref
Apps	Player	Birth	Pos	1	2	3	4	5	Age of first/last	ISHOF member	Note	Ref
4	Sofia Konukh	1980	FP	2000	2004	2008	2012		20/32			
3	Elena Smurova	1974	FP	2000	2004	2008			26/34			
3	Nadezhda Glyzina	1988	FP	2008	2012	2016			20/28			
3	Evgenia Soboleva	1988	FP	2008	2012	2016			19/27			
3	Ekaterina Lisunova	1989	FP	2008	2012	2016			18/26			
3	Ekaterina Prokofyeva	1991	FP	2008	2012	2016			17/25			

=== South Africa ===
- Women's national team: Japan
- Team appearances: 1 (2020^{*})
- As host team: 2020^{*}
- Number of four-time Olympians: 0
- Number of three-time Olympians: 0
- Last updated: 26 July 2021.

=== Spain ===
- Women's national team: Spain
- Team appearances: 3 (2012–2020)
- As host team: —

* Number of four-time Olympians: 0

- Number of three-time Olympians: 0
- Last updated: 26 July 2021.

=== United States ===
- Women's national team: United States
- Team appearances: 6 (2000–2020)
- As host team: —

* Number of five-time Olympians: 0

- Number of four-time Olympians: 2
- Number of three-time Olympians: 1
- Last updated: 26 July 2021.

Legend

- – Hosts

Female athletes who competed in water polo at three or more Olympics
Apps	Player	Birth	Pos	Water polo tournaments					Age of first/last	ISHOF member	Note	Ref
Apps	Player	Birth	Pos	1	2	3	4	5	Age of first/last	ISHOF member	Note	Ref
4	Heather Petri	1978	FP	2000	2004	2008	2012		22/34			
4	Brenda Villa	1980	FP	2000	2004	2008	2012		20/32	2018		
3	Kami Craig	1987	FP	2008	2012	2016			21/29			

== See also ==
- Water polo at the Summer Olympics
- Lists of Olympic water polo records and statistics
  - List of men's Olympic water polo tournament records and statistics
  - List of women's Olympic water polo tournament records and statistics
  - List of Olympic champions in men's water polo
  - List of Olympic champions in women's water polo
  - National team appearances in the men's Olympic water polo tournament
  - National team appearances in the women's Olympic water polo tournament
  - List of players who have appeared in multiple men's Olympic water polo tournaments
  - List of Olympic medalists in water polo (men)
  - List of Olympic medalists in water polo (women)
  - List of men's Olympic water polo tournament top goalscorers
  - List of women's Olympic water polo tournament top goalscorers
  - List of men's Olympic water polo tournament goalkeepers
  - List of women's Olympic water polo tournament goalkeepers
  - List of Olympic venues in water polo

== Sources ==
=== Official Results Books (IOC) ===
PDF documents in the LA84 Foundation Digital Library:

- Official Results Book – 2000 Olympic Games – Water Polo (download, archive)
- Official Results Book – 2004 Olympic Games – Water Polo (download, archive)
- Official Results Book – 2008 Olympic Games – Water Polo (download, archive)

PDF documents on the FINA website:

- Official Results Book – 2012 Olympic Games – Diving, Swimming, Synchronised Swimming, Water Polo (archive) (pp. 284–507)

PDF documents in the Olympic World Library:

- Official Results Book – 2016 Olympic Games – Water Polo (archive)

PDF documents on the International Olympic Committee website:

- Official Results Book – 2020 Olympic Games – Water Polo (archive)
- Official Results Book – 2024 Olympic Games – Water Polo

=== Official Reports (FINA) ===
PDF documents on the FINA website:

- HistoFINA – Water polo medalists and statistics (as of September 2019) (archive) (p. 56)
- 1870–2020 | 150 years of Water Polo – Evolution of its rules (archive)

=== Official website (IOC) ===
Water polo on the International Olympic Committee website:

- Water polo
- Women's water polo

=== Olympedia ===
Water polo on the Olympedia website:

- Water polo
- Women's water polo
- Athlete count for water polo
- Water polo venues
- Water polo at the 2000 Summer Olympics (women's tournament)
- Water polo at the 2004 Summer Olympics (women's tournament)
- Water polo at the 2008 Summer Olympics (women's tournament)
- Water polo at the 2012 Summer Olympics (women's tournament)
- Water polo at the 2016 Summer Olympics (women's tournament)
- Water polo at the 2020 Summer Olympics (women's tournament)

=== Sports Reference ===
Water polo on the Sports Reference website:

- Country Medal Leaders & Athlete Medal Leaders (1900–2016) (archived)
- Women's water polo (2000–2016) (archived)
- Water polo at the 2000 Summer Games (women's tournament) (archived)
- Water polo at the 2004 Summer Games (women's tournament) (archived)
- Water polo at the 2008 Summer Games (women's tournament) (archived)
- Water polo at the 2012 Summer Games (women's tournament) (archived)
- Water polo at the 2016 Summer Games (women's tournament) (archived)

=== Todor66 ===
Water polo on the Todor66 website:

- Water polo at the Summer Games
- Water polo at the 2000 Summer Olympics (women's tournament, women's qualification)
- Water polo at the 2004 Summer Olympics (women's tournament, women's qualification)
- Water polo at the 2008 Summer Olympics (women's tournament, women's qualification)
- Water polo at the 2012 Summer Olympics (women's tournament, women's qualification)
- Water polo at the 2016 Summer Olympics (women's tournament, women's qualification)
- Water polo at the 2020 Summer Olympics (women's tournament, women's qualification)

=== ISHOF ===
International Swimming Hall of Fame (ISHOF) website:

- Honorees Listed by Category – Water Polo
- Honorees Listed by Category – Coaches
- Honorees Listed by Category – Contributors
- Honorees by Country
- Honorees By Last Name
