= Russia women's Olympic water polo team records and statistics =

This article lists various water polo records and statistics in relation to the Russia women's national water polo team at the Summer Olympics.

The Russia women's national water polo team has participated in 6 of 6 official women's water polo tournaments.

== Abbreviations ==
Apps	Appearances	Rk	Rank	Ref	Reference	Cap No.	Water polo cap number
Pos	Playing position	FP	Field player	GK	Goalkeeper	ISHOF	International Swimming Hall of Fame
L/R	Handedness	L	Left-handed	R	Right-handed	Oly debut	Olympic debut in water polo
(C)	Captain	p.	page	pp.	pages		

== Team statistics ==
=== Comprehensive results by tournament ===
Note: Results of Olympic qualification tournaments are not included. Last updated: 5 May 2021.

Legend

- 1st – Champions
- 2nd – Runners-up
- 3rd – Third place
- 4th – Fourth place
- Q – Qualified for forthcoming tournament

Women's team	2000	2004	2008	2012	2016	2020	Years
Russia	3rd	5th	7th	6th	3rd	Q	6
Total teams	6	8	8	8	8	10	

=== Number of appearances ===
Last updated: 5 May 2021.

Women's team	Apps	Record streak	Active streak	Debut	Most recent	Best finish	Confederation
Russia	5	5	5	2000	2016	Third place	Europe – LEN

=== Best finishes ===
Last updated: 5 May 2021.

Women's team	Best finish	Apps	Confederation
Russia	Third place (2000, 2016)	5	Europe – LEN

=== Finishes in the top four ===
Last updated: 5 May 2021.

Women's team	Total	Champions	Runners-up	Third place	Fourth place	First	Last
Russia	2			2 (2000, 2016)		2000	2016

=== Medal table ===
Last updated: 5 May 2021.

Women's team	Gold	Silver	Bronze	Total
Russia (RUS)	0	0	2	2

== Player statistics ==
=== Multiple appearances ===
The following table is pre-sorted by number of Olympic appearances (in descending order), year of the last Olympic appearance (in ascending order), year of the first Olympic appearance (in ascending order), date of birth (in ascending order), name of the player (in ascending order), respectively.

- Number of five-time Olympians: 0
- Number of four-time Olympians: 1
- Number of three-time Olympians: 5
- Last updated: 26 July 2021.

Female athletes who competed in water polo at three or more Olympics
Apps	Player	Birth	Pos	Water polo tournaments					Age of first/last	ISHOF member	Note	Ref
Apps	Player	Birth	Pos	1	2	3	4	5	Age of first/last	ISHOF member	Note	Ref
4	Sofia Konukh	1980	FP	2000	2004	2008	2012		20/32			
3	Elena Smurova	1974	FP	2000	2004	2008			26/34			
3	Nadezhda Glyzina	1988	FP	2008	2012	2016			20/28			
3	Evgenia Soboleva	1988	FP	2008	2012	2016			19/27			
3	Ekaterina Lisunova	1989	FP	2008	2012	2016			18/26			
3	Ekaterina Prokofyeva	1991	FP	2008	2012	2016			17/25			

=== Multiple medalists ===
The following table is pre-sorted by total number of Olympic medals (in descending order), number of Olympic gold medals (in descending order), number of Olympic silver medals (in descending order), year of receiving the last Olympic medal (in ascending order), year of receiving the first Olympic medal (in ascending order), name of the player (in ascending order), respectively.

- Number of three-time Olympic medalists: 0
- Number of two-time Olympic medalists: 0
- Last updated: 1 May 2021.

=== Top goalscorers ===
The following table is pre-sorted by number of total goals (in descending order), year of the last Olympic appearance (in ascending order), year of the first Olympic appearance (in ascending order), name of the player (in ascending order), respectively.

- Number of goalscorers (40+ goals): 0
- Number of goalscorers (30–39 goals): 2
- Number of goalscorers (20–29 goals): 2
- Last updated: 12 August 2021.

Female players with 20 or more goals at the Olympics
Rk	Player	Birth	L/R	Total goals	Water polo tournaments (goals)					Age of first/last	ISHOF member	Note	Ref
Rk	Player	Birth	L/R	Total goals	1	2	3	4	5	Age of first/last	ISHOF member	Note	Ref
1	Ekaterina Prokofyeva	1991	Right	37	2008 (4)	2012 (9)	2016 (9)	2020 (15)		17/30			
2	Sofia Konukh	1980	Right	31	2000 (11)	2004 (9)	2008 (7)	2012 (4)		20/32			
3	Nadezhda Glyzina	1988	Right	28	2008 (1)	2012 (7)	2016 (13)	2020 (7)		20/33			
4	Evgeniya Ivanova	1987	Right	26	2012 (9)	2016 (7)	2020 (10)			25/34			

- Official Results Books (PDF): 2000 (p. 100), 2004 (pp. 80–81), 2008 (pp. 74–75), 2012 (pp. 365–366), 2016 (pp. 215–216), 2020 (pp. 266–267).

=== Goalkeepers ===
The following table is pre-sorted by edition of the Olympics (in ascending order), cap number or name of the goalkeeper (in ascending order), respectively.

Last updated: 1 April 2021.

Abbreviation

- Eff % – Save efficiency (Saves / Shots)

Year	Cap No.	Goalkeeper	Birth	Age	Saves	Shots	Eff %	ISHOF member	Note	Ref
2000 (bronze)	1	Marina Akobiya	1975	25	43	76	56.6%		Starting goalkeeper	
2000 (bronze)	2	Galina Rytova	1975	25	5	11	45.5%			
2004	1	Valentina Vorontsova	1982	22	23	60	38.3%		Starting goalkeeper	
2004	6	Galina Zlotnikova	1984	20	3	6	50.0%			
2008	1	Valentina Vorontsova (2)	1982	26	13	37	35.1%			
2008	13	Yevgeniya Protsenko	1983	24	13	29	44.8%			
2012	1	Maria Kovtunovskaya	1988	23	29	55	52.7%			
2012	13	Anna Karnaukh	1993	18	22	53	41.5%			
2016 (bronze)	1	Anna Ustyukhina	1989	27	10	35	28.6%			
2016 (bronze)	13	Anna Karnaukh (2)	1993	22	27	67	40.3%			
Year	Cap No.	Goalkeeper	Birth	Age	Saves	Shots	Eff %	ISHOF member	Note	Ref

- Official Results Books (PDF): 2000 (p. 100), 2004 (pp. 80–81), 2008 (pp. 74–75), 2012 (pp. 365–366), 2016 (pp. 215–216).

=== Top sprinters ===
The following table is pre-sorted by number of total sprints won (in descending order), year of the last Olympic appearance (in ascending order), year of the first Olympic appearance (in ascending order), name of the sprinter (in ascending order), respectively.

* Number of sprinters (30+ sprints won): 0

- Number of sprinters (20–29 sprints won): 0
- Number of sprinters (10–19 sprints won): 2
- Number of sprinters (5–9 sprints won): 1
- Last updated: 15 May 2021.

Abbreviation

- Eff % – Efficiency (Sprints won / Sprints contested)

Female players with 5 or more sprints won at the Olympics
Rk	Sprinter	Birth	Total sprints won	Total sprints contested	Eff %	Water polo tournaments (sprints won / contested)					Age of first/last	ISHOF member	Note	Ref
Rk	Sprinter	Birth	Total sprints won	Total sprints contested	Eff %	1	2	3	4	5	Age of first/last	ISHOF member	Note	Ref
1	Tatiana Petrova	1973	19	35	54.3%	2000 (16/22)	2004 (3/13)				27/31			
2	Ekaterina Lisunova	1989	13	20	65.0%	2008 (6/11)	2012 (1/1)	2016 (6/8)			18/26			
3	Ekaterina Prokofyeva	1991	8	27	29.6%	2008 (2/4)	2012 (5/13)	2016 (1/10)			17/25			

- Official Results Books (PDF): 2000 (p. 100), 2004 (pp. 80–81), 2008 (pp. 74–75), 2012 (pp. 365–366), 2016 (pp. 215–216).

== See also ==
- Russia men's Olympic water polo team records and statistics
- List of women's Olympic water polo tournament records and statistics
- Lists of Olympic water polo records and statistics
- Russia at the Olympics

== Sources ==
=== Official Results Books (IOC) ===
PDF documents in the LA84 Foundation Digital Library:

- Official Results Book – 2000 Olympic Games – Water Polo (download, archive)
- Official Results Book – 2004 Olympic Games – Water Polo (download, archive)
- Official Results Book – 2008 Olympic Games – Water Polo (download, archive)

PDF documents on the FINA website:

- Official Results Book – 2012 Olympic Games – Diving, Swimming, Synchronised Swimming, Water Polo (archive) (pp. 284–507)

PDF documents in the Olympic World Library:

- Official Results Book – 2016 Olympic Games – Water Polo (archive)

PDF documents on the International Olympic Committee website:

- Official Results Book – 2020 Olympic Games – Water Polo (archive)
- Official Results Book – 2024 Olympic Games – Water Polo

=== Official Reports (FINA) ===
PDF documents on the FINA website:

- HistoFINA – Water polo medalists and statistics (as of September 2019) (archive) (p. 56)
- 1870–2020 | 150 years of Water Polo – Evolution of its rules (archive)

=== Official website (IOC) ===
Water polo on the International Olympic Committee website:

- Water polo
- Women's water polo

=== Olympedia ===
Water polo on the Olympedia website:

- Water polo
- Women's water polo
- Athlete count for water polo
- Water polo venues
- Water polo at the 2000 Summer Olympics (women's tournament)
- Water polo at the 2004 Summer Olympics (women's tournament)
- Water polo at the 2008 Summer Olympics (women's tournament)
- Water polo at the 2012 Summer Olympics (women's tournament)
- Water polo at the 2016 Summer Olympics (women's tournament)
- Water polo at the 2020 Summer Olympics (women's tournament)

=== Sports Reference ===
Water polo on the Sports Reference website:

- Country Medal Leaders & Athlete Medal Leaders (1900–2016) (archived)
- Women's water polo (2000–2016) (archived)
- Water polo at the 2000 Summer Games (women's tournament) (archived)
- Water polo at the 2004 Summer Games (women's tournament) (archived)
- Water polo at the 2008 Summer Games (women's tournament) (archived)
- Water polo at the 2012 Summer Games (women's tournament) (archived)
- Water polo at the 2016 Summer Games (women's tournament) (archived)

=== Todor66 ===
Water polo on the Todor66 website:

- Water polo at the Summer Games
- Water polo at the 2000 Summer Olympics (women's tournament, women's qualification)
- Water polo at the 2004 Summer Olympics (women's tournament, women's qualification)
- Water polo at the 2008 Summer Olympics (women's tournament, women's qualification)
- Water polo at the 2012 Summer Olympics (women's tournament, women's qualification)
- Water polo at the 2016 Summer Olympics (women's tournament, women's qualification)
- Water polo at the 2020 Summer Olympics (women's tournament, women's qualification)

=== ISHOF ===
International Swimming Hall of Fame (ISHOF) website:

- Honorees Listed by Category – Water Polo
- Honorees Listed by Category – Coaches
- Honorees Listed by Category – Contributors
- Honorees by Country
- Honorees By Last Name
