= Natalia Kutuzova =

Russian water polo player

Personal information
- Full name: Natalia Anatolyevna Kutuzova
- Born: March 18, 1975 (age 51) Moscow, Russian SFSR, Soviet Union
Medal record
Women's water polo
Representing Russia
Olympic Games
Bronze medal – third place	2000 Sydney	Team
European Championship
Bronze medal – third place	1999 Prato	Team competition

Natalia Anatolyevna Kutuzova (Russian: Наталья Анатольевна Кутузова, born March 18, 1975) is a Russian water polo player, who won the bronze medal at the 2000 Summer Olympics. She was a part of the team at the World Championships, most recently at the 2009 World Aquatics Championships.

== See also ==
- List of Olympic medalists in water polo (women)
