= Anna Karnaukh =

Russian water polo player

Personal information
- Full name: Anna Olegovna Karnaukh
- Nationality: Russia
- Born: 31 August 1993 (age 33) Kirishi, Leningrad Oblast, Russia
- Height: 1.73 m (5 ft 8 in)
- Weight: 61 kg (134 lb)

Sport
- Sport: Water polo
- Position: Goalkeeper
- Current club: Kinef Kirishi
Medal record
Women's water polo
Representing Russia
Olympic Games
| Bronze medal – third place | 2016 Rio de Janeiro | Team |
World Championships
| Bronze medal – third place | 2011 Shanghai | Team |
| Bronze medal – third place | 2017 Budapest | Team |
European Championships
| Silver medal – second place | 2020 Budapest |
Universiade
| Gold medal – first place | 2013 Kazan | Team |

Anna Olegovna Karnaukh (Russian: Анна Олеговна Карнаух; born 31 August 1993) is a Russian water polo player. At the 2012 Summer Olympics, she competed for the Russia women's national water polo team in the women's event.

== See also ==
- Russia women's Olympic water polo team records and statistics
- List of Olympic medalists in water polo (women)
- List of women's Olympic water polo tournament goalkeepers
- List of World Aquatics Championships medalists in water polo
