= Moriah van Norman =

American water polo player (born 1984)

Personal information
- Born: May 30, 1984 (age 42) San Diego, California, U.S.
Medal record
Women's water polo
Representing the United States
Olympic Games
Silver medal – second place	2008 Beijing	Team competition
World Championships
Gold medal – first place	2007 Melbourne	Team competition
Gold medal – first place	2009 Rome	Team competition
Silver medal – second place	2005 Montreal	Team competition

Moriah van Norman (born May 30, 1984) is an American water polo player who has played for the University of Southern California and the National team, who won the Peter J. Cutino Award in 2004, recognized as the best female collegiate player in the nation. Her position is two-meter offense (center forward).

== High school and USC ==
Van Norman was born in San Diego, California. She earned four-time high school All-American honors at University of San Diego High School in San Diego. She was named California Interscholastic Federation player of the year and league most valuable player in her senior season.

Van Norman earned All-America honors in her 2003 freshman season after leading her USC Trojans team in scoring with 65 goals. She scored three or more goals in five matches including five against UC Berkeley and three against UCLA. As a 2004 sophomore, van Norman finished second on the team in scoring with 58 goals, leading her team to win the NCAA Women's Water Polo Championship. She became the third player in USC women's water polo history to win the Peter J. Cutino Award as the nation's top collegiate women's player and the last person to receive the award from legendary former Cal coach Pete Cutino, who died in September 2004. In 2005, van Norman was third on the team in scoring with 40 goals in her junior season. In her final season, USC, with a season record of 27–3, was top-seeded at the NCAA championships, but van Norman's six goals in the 3 tournament matches were not enough. She picked up her third ejection with 5:15 left in the final game, and sat out the remainder of the game on the bench as UCLA won, 9–8. Van Norman racked up 215 goals in her four years with USC, third all-time in Trojan history.

== Career ==
Van Norman was a member of the U.S. Junior National Team, won gold at the 2005 FINA Junior World Championships and silver at the 2003 FINA Junior World Championships. She also played with the 2002 Pan-American Games championship team. van Norman is a member of the U.S. national team, which won silver at the 2005 FINA World Water Polo Championships.

At the 2008 China Summer Olympic games, she and the American team lost 8–9 in the Championship game to the Netherlands and took home the silver medal.

In June 2009, van Norman was named to the USA water polo women's senior national team for the 2009 FINA World Championships.

== See also ==
- List of Olympic medalists in water polo (women)
- List of world champions in women's water polo
- List of World Aquatics Championships medalists in water polo
