= Evgenia Soboleva =

Russian water polo player

Personal information
- Full name: Evgenia Viktorovna Soboleva
- Nationality: Russian
- Born: 26 August 1988 (age 38) Kirishi, Soviet Union
- Height: 1.80 m (5 ft 11 in)
- Weight: 75 kg (165 lb)

Sport
- Sport: Water polo
- Position: Centre back
- Current club: Kinef Kirishi
National team
- Years: Team
- 2006–: Russia
Medal record
Olympic Games
Bronze medal – third place	2016 Rio de Janeiro	Team
World Championships
Bronze medal – third place	2007 Melbourne	Team
Bronze medal – third place	2009 Rome	Team
Bronze medal – third place	2011 Shanghai	Team
European Championships
Gold medal – first place	2008 Malaga
Gold medal – first place	2010 Zagreb
Silver medal – second place	2020 Budapest

Evgenia Viktorovna Soboleva (Russian: Евгения Викторовна Соболева; born 26 August 1988) is a Russian water polo player. At the 2008 Summer Olympics and 2012 Summer Olympics, she competed for the Russia women's national water polo team in the women's event. She also competed at 2016 Women's European Water Polo Championship

== See also ==
- Russia women's Olympic water polo team records and statistics
- List of Olympic medalists in water polo (women)
- List of players who have appeared in multiple women's Olympic water polo tournaments
- List of World Aquatics Championships medalists in water polo
