= Maria Kovtunovskaya =

Russian water polo player

Personal information
- Born: 19 December 1988 (age 37) Gorky, Soviet Union (now Nizhny Novgorod, Russia)

Sport
- Sport: Water polo
Medal record
Representing Russia
World Championships
| Bronze medal – third place | 2007 Melbourne | Team competition |
| Bronze medal – third place | 2009 Rome | Team competition |
| Bronze medal – third place | 2011 Shanghai | Team competition |
European Championships
| Gold medal – first place | 2010 Zagreb | Team competition |

Mariia Kovtunovskaia (born 19 December 1988) is a Russian water polo player. At the 2012 Summer Olympics, she competed for the Russia women's national water polo team in the women's event. She is 1.65 m (5 ft 5 in) tall.

== See also ==
- Russia women's Olympic water polo team records and statistics
- List of women's Olympic water polo tournament goalkeepers
- List of World Aquatics Championships medalists in water polo
