= Tatiana Petrova =

Russian water polo player

Personal information
- Born: 22 May 1973 (age 53) Chelyabinsk, Soviet Union

Sport
- Sport: Water polo
Medal record
Representing Russia
Olympic Games
Bronze medal – third place	2000 Sydney	Team
World Championships
Bronze medal – third place	2003 Barcelona	Team
European Championship
Bronze medal – third place	1999 Prato	Team competition
Bronze medal – third place	2001 Budapest	Team competition

Tatiana Vladimirovna Petrova (Russian: Татьяна Владимировна Петрова, born 22 May 1973) is a Russian water polo player who competed in the 2000 Summer Olympics and in the 2004 Summer Olympics.

In 2000, she won the bronze medal with the Russian team. She was the top sprinter at the 2000 Olympics, with 16 sprints won.

Four years later she was part of the Russian team which finished fifth.

== See also ==
- Russia women's Olympic water polo team records and statistics
- List of Olympic medalists in water polo (women)
- List of World Aquatics Championships medalists in water polo
