= Natalia Shepelina =

Russian water polo player (born 1981)

Personal information
- Full name: Nataliya Vladimirovna Shepelina
- Born: 24 February 1981 (age 45) Chelyabinsk, Soviet Union
- Height: 1.67 m (5 ft 6 in)
- Weight: 63 kg (139 lb)

Sport
- Sport: Water polo
- Position: driver

Senior clubs
- Years: Team
- ?-?: Uralochka Zlatoust
National team
- Years: Team
- ?-?: Russia
Medal record
Representing Russia
World Championships
Bronze medal – third place	2007 Melbourne	Team competition
Representing Kazakhstan
Asian Games
Silver medal – second place	2010 Guangzhou	Team competition
Bronze medal – third place	2014 Incheon	Team competition

Nataliya Vladimirovna Shepelina (Наталья Владимировна Шепелина, born 24 February 1981) was a Russian female water polo player. She was a member of the Russia women's national water polo team, playing as driver.

She was a part of the team at the 2004 Summer Olympics, 2008 Summer Olympics, and 2007 World Aquatics Championships.

On club level she played for Uralochka Zlatoust in Russia.

== See also ==
- List of World Aquatics Championships medalists in water polo
