= Marina Akobiya =

Russian water polo player (born 1975)

Personal information
- Born: January 12, 1975 (age 51) Volgograd
Medal record
Women's water polo
Representing Russia
Olympic Games
Bronze medal – third place	2000 Sydney	Team competition
European Championship
Bronze medal – third place	1999 Prato	Team competition
Bronze medal – third place	2001 Budapest	Team competition

Marina Dazmirovna Akobiya (Russian: Марина Дазмировна Акобия, born January 12, 1975) is a Russian water polo player, who won the bronze medal at the 2000 Summer Olympics.

== See also ==
- Russia women's Olympic water polo team records and statistics
- List of Olympic medalists in water polo (women)
- List of women's Olympic water polo tournament goalkeepers
