= Anastasia Zubkova =

Russian water polo player

Personal information
- Full name: Anastasiya Viktorovna Zubkova
- Nationality: Russia
- Born: 3 February 1980 (age 46) Chelyabinsk, Soviet Union
- Height: 1.73 m (5 ft 8 in)
- Weight: 66 kg (146 lb)

Sport
- Sport: Water polo

Senior clubs
- Years: Team
- ?-?: Uralochka Zlatoust
National team
- Years: Team
- ?-?: Russia
Medal record
Representing Russia
World Championships
Bronze medal – third place	2003 Barcelona	Team competition
Bronze medal – third place	2007 Melbourne	Team competition

Anastasiya Viktorovna Zubkova (Анастасия Викторовна Зубкова, born 3 February 1980) is a Russian female water polo player. She was a member of the Russia women's national water polo team. She was a part of the team at the 2004 Summer Olympics. On the club level, she played for Uralochka Zlatoust in Russia.

She is the twin sister of water polo player Anna Zubkova, who competed for the Kazakhstan national team at the 2004 Olympics.

== See also ==
- List of World Aquatics Championships medalists in water polo
