= Sofia Konukh =

Russian water polo player

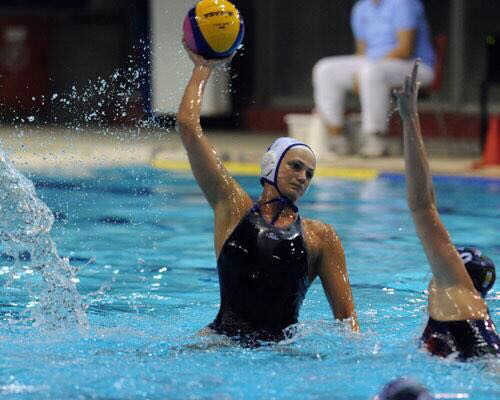
- A Russian water polo player

Personal information
- Full name: Sofia Evgenevna Konukh
- Born: 9 March 1980 (age 46) Chelyabinsk, Soviet Union
Medal record
Women's water polo
Representing Russia
Olympic Games
Bronze medal – third place	2000 Sydney	Team competition
World Championships
Bronze medal – third place	2003 Barcelona	Team competition
Bronze medal – third place	2007 Melbourne	Team competition
Bronze medal – third place	2009 Rome	Team competition
Bronze medal – third place	2011 Shanghai	Team competition
European Championships
Gold medal – first place	2006 Belgrade	Team competition
Gold medal – first place	2008 Malaga	Team competition
Gold medal – first place	2010 Zagreb	Team competition
Silver medal – second place	1997 Seville	Team competition
Bronze medal – third place	1999 Prato	Team competition
Bronze medal – third place	2001 Budapest	Team competition
Bronze medal – third place	2003 Ljubljana	Team competition

Sofia Evgenevna Konukh (Russian: Софья Евгеньевна Конух, born 9 March 1980) is a Russian water polo player, who won the bronze medal at the 2000 Summer Olympics, the first Olympic women's tournament in history. She is one of four female players who competed in water polo at four Olympics. She is also a leading goalscorer in Olympic water polo history, with 31 goals.

She finished first with the Russia team at the 2006 European Championships in Belgrade, Serbia.

She participated at the 2003 World Aquatics Championships, 2007 World Aquatics Championships, 2009 World Aquatics Championships, and 2011 World Aquatics Championships,

== See also ==
- Russia women's Olympic water polo team records and statistics
- List of Olympic medalists in water polo (women)
- List of players who have appeared in multiple women's Olympic water polo tournaments
- List of women's Olympic water polo tournament top goalscorers
- List of World Aquatics Championships medalists in water polo

Awards
Preceded by (Netherlands) Iefke van Belkum	LEN European Water Polo Player of the Year; 2010	Succeeded by (Greece) Alexandra Asimaki
