= Olga Beliaeva =

Russian water polo player

Personal information
- Born: 18 March 1985 (age 41) Union of Soviet Socialist Republics
- Height: 5 ft 8 in (1.73 m)
Medal record
Women's water polo
Representing Russia
World Championships
Bronze medal – third place	2009 Rome	Team competition
Bronze medal – third place	2011 Shanghai	Team competition
European Championships
Gold medal – first place	2008 Malaga	Team competition
Gold medal – first place	2010 Zagreb	Team competition
Universiade
Gold medal – first place	2013 Kazan	Team competition

Olga Beliaeva or Olga Fomicheva (born 18 March 1985) is a Russian water polo player. At the 2008 and 2012 Summer Olympics, she competed for the Russia women's national water polo team in the women's event. She is 1.73 m (5 ft 8 in) tall. She won the gold medal at the 2006 European Championship in Belgrade, Serbia. She holds the title of Honoured Master of Sport in the Russian Federation.

== Personal ==
She is married with Dmitry. She graduated from St. Petersburg State University of Economics where she studied economics and management in petrol, gas and chemical complexes. In October 2013 she took part in the Olympic torch relay for the 2014 Winter Olympics in Sochi.

== See also ==
- List of World Aquatics Championships medalists in water polo
