= Elena Smurova =

Russian water polo player

Personal information
- Full name: Elena Yurievna Smurova
- Born: 18 January 1974 (age 52) Leningrad, Soviet Union
Medal record
Women's water polo
Representing Russia
Olympic Games
Bronze medal – third place	2000 Sydney	Team competition
World Championships
Bronze medal – third place	2003 Barcelona	Team competition
Bronze medal – third place	2007 Melbourne	Team competition
European Championships
Gold medal – first place	2006 Belgrade	Team competition
Gold medal – first place	2008 Malaga	Team competition
Bronze medal – third place	1999 Prato	Team competition
World Cup
Bronze medal – third place	2006 Tianjin	Team competition

Elena Yurievna Smurova (Russian: Елена Юрьевна Смурова, born 18 January 1974) is a Russian water polo player, who won the bronze medal at the 2000 Summer Olympics. She was the top scorer of the 2005 FINA Women's Water Polo World League, scoring a total number of 31 goals.

== See also ==
- Russia women's Olympic water polo team records and statistics
- List of Olympic medalists in water polo (women)
- List of players who have appeared in multiple women's Olympic water polo tournaments
- List of World Aquatics Championships medalists in water polo
