= Valentina Vorontsova =

Russian water polo player

Personal information
- Full name: Valentina Grigoryevna Vorontsova
- Born: 26 July 1982 (age 44) Kabardinka, Krasnodar Krai, Soviet Union
- Height: 1.70 m (5 ft 7 in)
- Weight: 65 kg (143 lb)

Sport
- Sport: Water polo
- Position: goalkeeper

Senior clubs
- Years: Team
- ?-? ?-?: SKIF MFP Izmaylovo; Kinef Kirishi
National team
- Years: Team
- ?-?: Russia
Medal record
Representing Russia
World Championships
| Bronze medal – third place | 2003 Barcelona | Team competition |
| Bronze medal – third place | 2007 Melbourne | Team competition |

Valentina Grigoryevna Vorontsova (Валентина Григорьевна Воронцова, born 26 July 1982) is a Russian female water polo player. She was a member of the Russia women's national water polo team, playing as goalkeeper.

She was a part of the team at the 2004 Summer Olympics and 2008 Summer Olympics. On club level she played for Kinef Kirishi in Russia.

== See also ==
- Russia women's Olympic water polo team records and statistics
- List of women's Olympic water polo tournament goalkeepers
- List of World Aquatics Championships medalists in water polo
