= Evgeniya Ivanova =

Russian water polo player

Personal information
- Full name: Evgeniya Andreyevna Ivanova
- Nationality: Russia
- Born: 26 July 1987 (age 39) Gorky, Soviet Union (now Nizhny Novgorod, Russia)
- Height: 1.76 m (5 ft 9 in)
- Weight: 67 kg (148 lb)

Sport
- Sport: Water polo
- Position: Driver
- Current club: Kinef Kirishi
Medal record
Women's water polo
Representing Russia
Olympic Games
Bronze medal – third place	2016 Rio de Janeiro	Team
World Championships
Bronze medal – third place	2009 Rome	Team
Bronze medal – third place	2011 Shanghai	Team
Bronze medal – third place	2017 Budapest	Team
European Championships
Gold medal – first place	2006 Belgrade
Gold medal – first place	2010 Zagreb
Silver medal – second place	2020 Budapest
Universiade
Gold medal – first place	2013 Kazan	Team

Evgeniya Andreyevna Ivanova (Russian: Евгения Андреева Иванова; born 26 July 1987) is a Russian water polo player. At the 2012 Summer Olympics, she competed for the Russian team in the women's event.

== Career ==
She originally began to play water polo in 2000 in Nizhny Novgorod, following the example of her father and grandfather. She made her international debut at the 2006 European Championship, which Russia won. At her first World Championships, the 2009 Worlds, she scored the winning goal in Russia's bronze medal match. In 2010, she scored Russia's winning goal at the 2010 European Championships. She participated at the 2011 World Aquatics Championships, and 2017 World Aquatics Championships.

She was part of the Russian team which won bronze at the 2016 Summer Olympics.

== See also ==
- List of Olympic medalists in water polo (women)
- List of World Aquatics Championships medalists in water polo
