= Ekaterina Lisunova =

Russian water polo player (born 1989)

Personal information
- Nationality: Russian
- Born: 6 October 1989 (age 36) Lviv, Ukrainian SSR, Soviet Union
- Height: 1.75 m (5 ft 9 in)
- Weight: 64 kg (141 lb)

Sport
- Country: Russia
- Sport: Water polo
- Club: Kinef-Surgutneftegaz, Kirishi
Medal record
Women's water polo
Representing Russia
Olympic Games
Bronze medal – third place	2016 Rio de Janeiro	Team
World Championships
Bronze medal – third place	2007 Melbourne	Team
Bronze medal – third place	2009 Rome	Team
Bronze medal – third place	2011 Shanghai	Team
European Championships
Gold medal – first place	2006 Belgrade
Gold medal – first place	2008 Malaga
Universiade
Gold medal – first place	2013 Kazan	Team

Ekaterina Andreyevna Lisunova (Russian: Екатерина Андреевна Лисунова; née Pantyulina on 6 October 1989) is a Russian water polo player. She competed at the 2008 and 2012 Summer Olympics and finished in seventh and sixth place, respectively, and was part of the Russian 2016 Summer Olympic team that won the bronze medal.

She is married to the water polo player Sergey Lisunov, they have a son.

== See also ==
- Russia women's Olympic water polo team records and statistics
- List of Olympic medalists in water polo (women)
- List of players who have appeared in multiple women's Olympic water polo tournaments
- List of World Aquatics Championships medalists in water polo
