= Alena Vylegzhanina =

Russian water polo player

Personal information
- Full name: Alyona Viktorovna Vylegzhanina
- Born: 14 August 1987 (age 39) Zlatoust, Soviet Union
- Height: 1.75 m (5 ft 9 in)
- Weight: 70 kg (154 lb)

Sport
- Sport: Water polo
- Position: centre back

Senior clubs
- Years: Team
- –: Uralochka Zlatoust
National team
- Years: Team
- –: Russia
Medal record
Representing Russia
World Championships
Bronze medal – third place	2007 Melbourne	Team competition
Bronze medal – third place	2009 Rome	Team competition
Summer Universiade
Bronze medal – third place	2011 Shenzhen	Team competition
- Updated on 11 May 2024

Alyona Viktorovna Vylegzhanina (Алёна Викторовна Вылегжанина, born 14 August 1987) is a Russian water polo player. She was a member of the Russia women's national water polo team, playing as a centre back. She was a part of the team at the 2008 Summer Olympics. On club level, she played for Uralochka Zlatoust in Russia.

== See also ==
- List of World Aquatics Championships medalists in water polo
