= Nadezhda Glyzina =

Russian water polo player

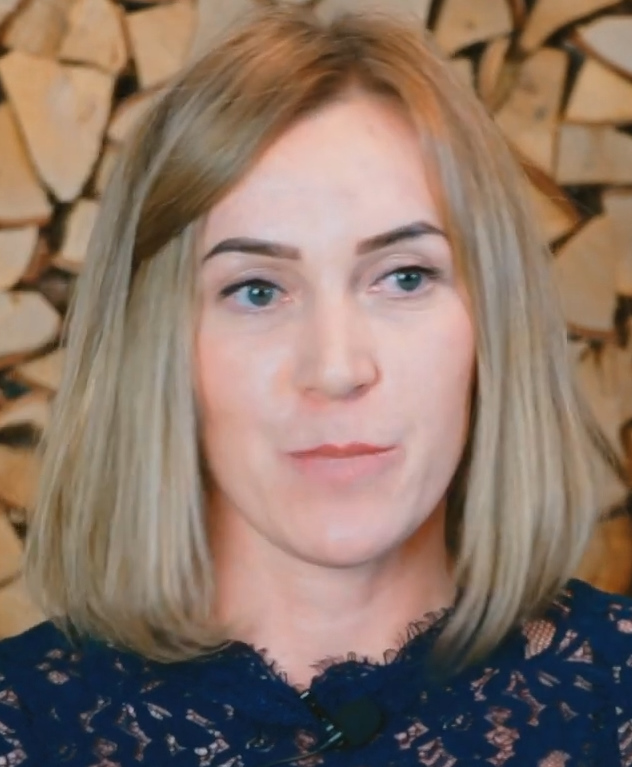
- Glyzina in 2020

Personal information
- Full name: Nadezhda Sergeyevna Glyzina
- Nationality: Russia
- Born: 20 May 1988 (age 38) Kirishi, Leningrad Oblast, Soviet Union
- Height: 1.70 m (5 ft 7 in)
- Weight: 65 kg (143 lb)

Sport
- Sport: Water polo
- Position: Driver
- Current club: Kinef Kirishi
Medal record
Olympic Games
Bronze medal – third place	2016 Rio de Janeiro	Team
World Championships
Bronze medal – third place	2011 Shanghai	Team

Nadezhda Sergeyevna Glyzina (Russian: Надежда Сергеевна Глызина, née Fedotova; born 20 May 1988) is a Russian female water polo player. She was a member of the Russia women's national water polo team, playing as a driver. She was a part of the team at the 2008 Summer Olympics, 2012 Summer Olympics and 2016 Summer Olympics. On club level she played for Kinef Kirishi in Russia.

== See also ==
- Russia women's Olympic water polo team records and statistics
- List of Olympic medalists in water polo (women)
- List of players who have appeared in multiple women's Olympic water polo tournaments
- List of women's Olympic water polo tournament top goalscorers
- List of World Aquatics Championships medalists in water polo
