= Yevgeniya Protsenko =

Russian water polo player

Personal information
- Nationality: Russian
- Born: 25 November 1983 (age 42) Chelyabinsk, Soviet Union

Sport
- Sport: Water polo
Medal record
Representing Russia
World Championships
Bronze medal – third place	2009 Rome	Team competition

Yevgeniya Protsenko (born 25 November 1983) is a Russian water polo player. She competed in the women's tournament at the 2008 Summer Olympics.

== See also ==
- Russia women's Olympic water polo team records and statistics
- List of women's Olympic water polo tournament goalkeepers
- List of World Aquatics Championships medalists in water polo
