= Australia at the 2008 Summer Olympics =

- IOC code: AUS
- NOC: Australian Olympic Committee
- Website: www.olympics.com.au

in Beijing
- Competitors: 433 in 26 sports
- Flag bearers: James Tomkins (opening); Stephanie Rice (closing)
- Medals Ranked 6th: Gold 14 Silver 15 Bronze 17 Total 46

Summer Olympics appearances (overview)
- 1896; 1900; 1904; 1908; 1912; 1920; 1924; 1928; 1932; 1936; 1948; 1952; 1956; 1960; 1964; 1968; 1972; 1976; 1980; 1984; 1988; 1992; 1996; 2000; 2004; 2008; 2012; 2016; 2020; 2024; 2028

Other related appearances
- 1906 Intercalated Games –––– Australasia (1908–1912)

A total of 433 competitors competed for Australia at the 2008 Summer Olympics in Beijing. This was Australia's second largest Olympic contingent after the 2004 Summer Olympics in Athens, which included 482 competitors. Australian athletes have competed in every Summer Olympic Games of the modern era.

In addition to competitors, 418 officials and 38 medical personnel were part of the Australian team. Australia competed in 26 of the 28 Olympic program sports; they failed to qualify in baseball and team handball. Australia also sent a men's but not a women's football (soccer) squad, and had two beach volleyball but no indoor volleyball teams competing.

== Medalists ==
Medal	Name	Sport	Event
Gold	Stephanie Rice	Swimming	Women's 400 m individual medley
Gold	Lisbeth Trickett	Swimming	Women's 100 m butterfly
Gold	Leisel Jones	Swimming	Women's 100 m breaststroke
Gold	Stephanie Rice	Swimming	Women's 200 m individual medley
Gold	Stephanie Rice; Bronte Barratt; Kylie Palmer; Linda Mackenzie; Felicity Galvez*; Angie Bainbridge*; Melanie Schlanger*; Lara Davenport*	Swimming	Women's 4 × 200 m freestyle relay
Gold	Drew Ginn; Duncan Free	Rowing	Men's coxless pair
Gold	Scott Brennan; David Crawshay	Rowing	Men's double sculls
Gold	Emily Seebohm; Leisel Jones; Jessicah Schipper; Libby Trickett; Tarnee White * Felicity Galvez*; Shayne Reese*	Swimming	Women's 4 × 100 m medley relay
Gold	Emma Snowsill	Triathlon	Women's triathlon
Gold	Nathan Wilmot; Malcolm Page	Sailing	Men's 470 class
Gold	Tessa Parkinson; Elise Rechichi	Sailing	Women's 470 class
Gold	Steven Hooker	Athletics	Men's pole vault
Gold	Ken Wallace	Canoeing	Men's K-1 500 m
Gold	Matthew Mitcham	Diving	Men's 10 m platform
Silver	Briony Cole; Melissa Wu	Diving	Women's 10 m synchronised platform
Silver	Clayton Fredericks; Lucinda Fredericks; Sonja Johnson; Megan Jones; Shane Rose	Equestrian	Team eventing
Silver	Eamon Sullivan	Swimming	Men's 100 m freestyle
Silver	Brenton Rickard	Swimming	Men's 200 m breaststroke
Silver	Leisel Jones	Swimming	Women's 200 m breaststroke
Silver	Libby Trickett	Swimming	Women's 100 m freestyle
Silver	Jacqueline Lawrence	Canoeing	Women's slalom K-1
Silver	Matt Ryan; James Marburg; Cameron McKenzie-McHarg; Francis Hegerty	Rowing	Men's coxless four
Silver	Grant Hackett	Swimming	Men's 1500 m freestyle
Silver	Hayden Stoeckel; Brenton Rickard; Andrew Lauterstein; Eamon Sullivan; Ashley Delaney * Christian Sprenger*; Adam Pine*; Matt Targett*	Swimming	Men's 4 × 100 m medley relay
Silver	Anna Meares	Cycling	Women's sprint
Silver	Sally McLellan	Athletics	Women's 100 m hurdles
Silver	Darren Bundock; Glenn Ashby	Sailing	Tornado class
Silver	Jared Tallent	Athletics	50 km walk
Silver	Australia women's national basketball team: Suzy Batkovic; Tully Bevilaqua; Rohanee Cox; Hollie Grima; Kristi Harrower; Lauren Jackson; Erin Phillips; Emma Randall; Jenni Screen; Belinda Snell; Laura Summerton; Penny Taylor	Basketball	Women's tournament
Bronze	Cate Campbell; Alice Mills; Melanie Schlanger; Libby Trickett; Shayne Reese*	Swimming	Women's 4 × 100 m freestyle relay
Bronze	Jessicah Schipper	Swimming	Women's 100 m butterfly
Bronze	Eamon Sullivan; Andrew Lauterstein; Ashley Callus; Matt Targett; Leith Brodie*; Patrick Murphy*	Swimming	Men's 4 × 100 m freestyle relay
Bronze	Hayden Stoeckel	Swimming	Men's 100 m backstroke
Bronze	Robin Bell	Canoeing	Men's slalom C-1
Bronze	Patrick Murphy; Grant Hackett; Grant Brits; Nick Ffrost; Leith Brodie*; Kirk Palmer *	Swimming	Men's 4 × 200 m freestyle relay
Bronze	Jessicah Schipper	Swimming	Women's 200 m butterfly
Bronze	Warren Potent	Shooting	Men's 50 m rifle prone
Bronze	Andrew Lauterstein	Swimming	Men's 100 m butterfly
Bronze	Jared Tallent	Athletics	20 km walk
Bronze	Cate Campbell	Swimming	Women's 50 m freestyle
Bronze	Emma Moffatt	Triathlon	Women's triathlon
Bronze	Australia women's national softball team: Jodie Bowering; Kylie Cronk; Kelly Hardie; Tanya Harding; Sandy Lewis; Simmone Morrow; Tracey Mosley; Stacey Porter; Melanie Roche; Justine Smethurst; Danielle Stewart; Natalie Titcume; Natalie Ward; Belinda Wright; Kerry Wyborn	Softball	Women's tournament
Bronze	Australia women's national water polo team: Gemma Beadsworth; Nikita Cuffe; Suzie Fraser; Taniele Gofers; Kate Gynther; Amy Hetzel; Bronwen Knox; Emma Knox; Alicia McCormack; Melissa Rippon; Rebecca Rippon; Mia Santoromito; Jenna Santoromito	Water polo	Women's tournament
Bronze	Ken Wallace	Canoeing	Men's K-1 1000 m
Bronze	Lisa Oldenhof; Hannah Davis; Chantal Meek; Lyndsie Fogarty	Canoeing	Women's K-4 500 m
Bronze	Australia national field hockey team: Des Abbott; Travis Brooks; Kiel Brown; Liam De Young; Luke Doerner; Jamie Dwyer; Bevan George; David Guest; Rob Hammond; Fergus Kavanagh; Mark Knowles; Stephen Lambert; Eli Matheson; Eddie Ockenden; Grant Schubert; Matt Wells	Field hockey	Men's tournament

== Archery ==
Australia had two archers earn qualification spots at the 2007 World Outdoor Target Championships and three earn spots at the Oceania continental championship. David Barnes and Sky Kim earned the men two spots at the World tournament, with Michael Naray earning a third spot, and the team qualification at the Oceania competition. Jade Lindsey and Jane Waller were the qualifying women at the Oceania tournament.

In making its final selections, Australia selected Kim and Naray along with Matthew Gray for the men's team, and Waller and Lexie Feeney for the women's team.

Men

Athlete	Event	Ranking round		Round of 64	Round of 32	Round of 16	Quarterfinals	Semifinals	Final / BM	
Athlete	Event	Score	Seed	Opposition Score	Opposition Score	Opposition Score	Opposition Score	Opposition Score	Opposition Score	Rank
Matthew Gray	Individual	654	39	Cheng C S (MAS) (26); L 101–109	Did not advance					
Sky Kim	Individual	665	14	Girouille (FRA) (51); W 112–110	Proć (POL) (19); L 110–111	Did not advance				
Michael Naray	Individual	658	30	Valladont (FRA) (35); W 108–106	Ruban (UKR) (3); L 105–115	Did not advance				
Matthew Gray; Sky Kim; Michael Naray	Team	1977	9	—N/a		Poland (8); L 218–223	Did not advance			

Women

Athlete	Event	Ranking round		Round of 64	Round of 32	Round of 16	Quarterfinals	Semifinals	Final / BM	
Athlete	Event	Score	Seed	Opposition Score	Opposition Score	Opposition Score	Opposition Score	Opposition Score	Opposition Score	Rank
Alexandra Feeney	Individual	580	59	Yuan S-C (TPE) (6); L 101–104	Did not advance					
Jane Waller	Individual	634	28	Vardineni (IND) (37); L 100–106	Did not advance					

== Athletics ==
Australia sent 40 representatives to compete in athletics events. 22 of these men competed in track events, ten in field events, seven in race walking, four in the marathons and one in combined events. The athletics did not start until the 15th of August, day seven of competition.

On day one of athletics, two finals were held but no Australians qualified to compete in either. On the second day of athletics, Australia won their first Olympic Medal for athletics in 2008. This person was Jared Tallent, an Olympic debutant, who competed in the men's 20 kilometre race walk. Tallent came third, only 15 second in front of fellow countryman Luke Adams who finished 6th. On the third day of competition, four Australians competed, three in medal events.

Key

- Note–Ranks given for track events are within the athlete's heat only
- Q = Qualified for the next round
- q = Qualified for the next round as a fastest loser or, in field events, by position without achieving the qualifying target
- NR = National record
- N/A = Round not applicable for the event
- Bye = Athlete not required to compete in round

Men
Track & road events

Athlete	Event	Heat		Semifinal		Final	
Athlete	Event	Result	Rank	Result	Rank	Result	Rank
Youcef Abdi	3000 m steeplechase	8:17.97	6 q	—N/a		8:16.36	6
Luke Adams	20 km walk	—N/a				1:19:57	6
Luke Adams	50 km walk	—N/a				3:47:45	10
Collis Birmingham	5000 m	13:44.90	10	—N/a		Did not advance	
Chris Erickson	20 km walk	—N/a				DSQ	
Mitchell Kealey	1500 m	3:46.31	11	Did not advance			
Joel Milburn	400 m	44.80	2 Q	45.06	3	Did not advance	
Craig Mottram	5000 m	13:44.59	5	—N/a		Did not advance	
Lachlan Renshaw	800 m	1:49.19	6	Did not advance			
Jeff Riseley	1500 m	3:53.95	12	Did not advance			
Adam Rutter	50 km walk	—N/a				DNF	
Jared Tallent	20 km walk	—N/a				1:19:42	3rd place, bronze medalist(s)
Jared Tallent	50 km walk	—N/a				3:39:27	2nd place, silver medalist(s)
Lee Troop	Marathon	—N/a				2:27:17	60
Sean Wroe	400 m	45.17	2 Q	45.56	7	Did not advance	
Clinton Hill; Joel Milburn; Mark Ormrod*; John Steffensen; Sean Wroe	4 × 400 m relay	3:00.68	4 q	—N/a		3:00.02	6

Field events

Athlete	Event	Qualification		Final	
Athlete	Event	Distance	Position	Distance	Position
Justin Anlezark	Shot put	19.91	16	Did not advance	
Jarrod Bannister	Javelin throw	79.79	11 q	83.45	6
Paul Burgess	Pole vault	5.55	=16	Did not advance	
Benn Harradine	Discus throw	58.55	31	Did not advance	
Steven Hooker	Pole vault	5.65	12 q	5.96 OR	1st place, gold medalist(s)
Fabrice Lapierre	Long jump	7.90	16	Did not advance	
Scott Martin	Shot put	19.75	21	Did not advance	

Women
Track & road events

Athlete	Event	Heat		Semifinal		Final	
Athlete	Event	Result	Rank	Result	Rank	Result	Rank
Lisa Corrigan	1500 m	4:16.32	9	—N/a		Did not advance	
Sarah Jamieson	1500 m	4:06.64	5	—N/a		Did not advance	
Benita Johnson	Marathon	—N/a				2:32:06	21
Tamsyn Lewis	400 m	52.38	4	Did not advance			
Tamsyn Lewis	800 m	1:59.67	4 q	2:01.41	8	Did not advance	
Donna MacFarlane	3000 m steeplechase	9:32.05	9	—N/a		Did not advance	
Sally McLellan	100 m hurdles	12.83	2 Q	12.70	4 Q	12.64	2nd place, silver medalist(s)
Victoria Mitchell	3000 m steeplechase	9:47.88	13	—N/a		Did not advance	
Madeleine Pape	800 m	2:03.09	6	Did not advance			
Jane Saville	20 km walk	—N/a				1:31:17	20
Kate Smyth	Marathon	—N/a				2:36:10	44
Kellie Wapshott	20 km walk	—N/a				1:37:59	40
Lisa Weightman	Marathon	—N/a				2:34:16	33
Claire Woods	20 km walk	—N/a				1:33:02	28

Field events

Athlete	Event	Qualification		Final	
Athlete	Event	Distance	Position	Distance	Position
Alana Boyd	Pole vault	4.30	=16	Did not advance	
Dani Samuels	Discus throw	61.72	7 Q	60.15	9
Bronwyn Thompson	Long jump	6.53	17	Did not advance	

Combined events – Heptathlon

Athlete	Event	100H	HJ	SP	200 m	LJ	JT	800 m	Final	Rank
Kylie Wheeler	Result	13.68	1.89	13.06	24.28	6.11	43.81	2:11.49	6369	10 (Note: The athlete who finished in second place, Lyudmila Blonska of Ukraine, tested positive for a banned substance. Both the A and the B tests were positive, therefore Blonska was stripped of her silver medal, and Wheeler moved up a position.)
Kylie Wheeler	Points	1024	1093	731	954	883	741	943	6369	10

== Badminton ==
Australia sent a team of six to Beijing. Stuart Gomez competed in the men's singles, while Erin Carroll competed in women's singles. Ross Smith and Glenn Warfe competed in the men's doubles and Tania Luiz and Eugenia Tanaka competed in the women's doubles.

Athlete	Event	Round of 64	Round of 32	Round of 16	Quarterfinal	Semifinal	Final / BM	
Athlete	Event	Opposition Score	Opposition Score	Opposition Score	Opposition Score	Opposition Score	Opposition Score	Rank
Stuart Gomez	Men's singles	Kehlhoffner (FRA); L 21–19, 20–22, 15–21	Did not advance					
Ross Smith; Glenn Warfe	Men's doubles	—N/a		Łogosz / Mateusiak (POL); L 13–21, 16–21	Did not advance			
Erin Carroll	Women's singles	Martínez (ESP); L 9–21, 16–21	Did not advance					
Tania Luiz; Eugenia Tanaka	Women's doubles	—N/a		Maeda / Suetsuna (JPN); L 4–21, 8–21	Did not advance			

== Basketball ==
Australia's men's basketball team qualified for the Olympics by defeating New Zealand in a best-of-three series to win the FIBA Oceania Championship 2007. The women's team automatically qualified as the reigning world champions after winning the 2006 FIBA World Championship for Women.

=== Men's tournament ===
Roster

The following is the Australia roster in the men's basketball tournament of the 2008 Summer Olympics.

Australia men's national basketball team – 2008 Summer Olympics roster
Players
Coaches

Pos.	No.	Name	Age – Date of birth	Height	Club	Ctr.
C	4	Chris Anstey	33 – January 1, 1975	7 ft 0 in (2.13 m)	Melbourne Tigers	(Australia)
PG	5	Patrick Mills	19 – August 11, 1988	6 ft 0 in (1.83 m)	Saint Mary's Gaels	(United States)
C	6	Andrew Bogut	23 – November 28, 1984	7 ft 0 in (2.13 m)	Milwaukee Bucks	(United States)
G/F	7	Joe Ingles	20 – October 2, 1987	6 ft 8 in (2.03 m)	South Dragons	(Australia)
G/F	8	Brad Newley	23 – February 18, 1985	6 ft 7 in (2.01 m)	Panellinios	(Greece)
G	9	C. J. Bruton	32 – December 13, 1975	6 ft 2 in (1.88 m)	New Zealand Breakers	(New Zealand)
F	10	David Barlow	24 – October 22, 1983	6 ft 9 in (2.06 m)	Melbourne Tigers	(Australia)
SF	11	Mark Worthington	25 – June 8, 1983	6 ft 7 in (2.01 m)	South Dragons	(Australia)
G/F	12	Glen Saville	32 – January 17, 1976	6 ft 6 in (1.98 m)	Wollongong Hawks	(Australia)
F/C	13	David Andersen	28 – June 23, 1980	6 ft 11 in (2.11 m)	FC Barcelona	(Spain)
F/C	14	Matthew Nielsen (C)	30 – February 3, 1978	6 ft 10 in (2.08 m)	BC Lietuvos rytas	(Lithuania)
F	15	Shawn Redhage	27 – January 21, 1981	6 ft 8 in (2.03 m)	Perth Wildcats	(Australia)

Head coach

- (Australia) Brian Goorjian

Assistant coach(es)

- (Australia) Brendan Joyce
- (Australia) Gordon McLeod

Legend

- (C) Team captain
- Club – describes last
  club before the tournament
- Age – describes age
  on August 9, 2008

Group play

Pos	Team	Pld	W	L	PF	PA	PD	Pts	Qualification
1	Lithuania	5	4	1	425	400	+25	9 (Note: Head-to-head record: Lithuania 1–0 Argentina)	Quarterfinals
2	Argentina	5	4	1	425	361	+64	9	Quarterfinals
3	Croatia	5	3	2	399	380	+19	8 (Note: Head-to-head record: Croatia 1–0 Australia)	Quarterfinals
4	Australia	5	3	2	457	405	+52	8	Quarterfinals
5	Russia	5	1	4	387	406	−19	6	
6	Iran	5	0	5	323	464	−141	5	

Source: FIBA archive
Rules for classification: 1) points; 2) head-to-head points; 3) head-to-head goal average; 4) head-to-head number of points scored.
Notes:

10 August 2008
20:00

Report

Australia	82–97	Croatia
Scoring by quarter: 14–21, 17–26, 22–26, 29–24
Pts: Nielsen 13; Rebs: Anstey 7 Asts: Barlow 3		Pts: Prkačin, Banić 16; Rebs: Lončar 10; Asts: Popović 5

Wukesong Indoor Stadium, Beijing
Attendance: 11,083
Referees: Eddie Rush (USA)

12 August 2008
22:15

Report

Argentina	85–68	Australia
Scoring by quarter: 23–11, 16–18, 24–17, 22–22
Pts: Ginobili 21; Rebs: Nocioni 8 Asts: Ginobili 7		Pts: Mills 22; Rebs: Andersen 6 Asts: Bogut, Bruton 2

Wukesong Indoor Stadium, Beijing
Attendance: 11,083
Referees: Nikolaos Pitsilkas (GRE)

14 August 2008
11:15

Report

Australia	106–68	Iran
Scoring by quarter: 28–15, 25–14, 22–19, 31–20
Pts: Newley 24; Rebs: Bogut 7 Asts: Mills, Worthington, Bruton 5		Pts: Nikkhah 23; Rebs: Haddadi 8 Asts: Davari 4

Wukesong Indoor Stadium, Beijing
Attendance: 11,083
Referees: Nikolaos Zavlanos (GRE)

16 August 2008
11:15

Report

Russia	80–95	Australia
Scoring by quarter: 16–27, 17–22, 22–20, 25–26
Pts: Khriapa 21; Rebs: Khriapa 9 Asts: Holden 6		Pts: Bogut, Bruton 22; Rebs: Bogut 8 Asts: Bruton 6

Wukesong Indoor Stadium, Beijing
Attendance: 11,083
Referees: Carl Jungebrand (FIN)

18 August 2008
11:15

Report

Australia	106–75	Lithuania
Scoring by quarter: 28–14, 27–15, 20–22, 31–24
Pts: Bogut 23; Rebs: Mills 4 Asts: Anstey 4		Pts: K. Lavrinovič 14; Rebs: K. Lavrinovič 8 Asts: Jasikevičius 5

Wukesong Indoor Stadium, Beijing
Attendance: 11,083
Referees: Nikolaos Pitsilkas (GRE)

Quarterfinals

20 August 2008
20:00

Report

United States	116–85	Australia
Scoring by quarter: 25–24, 30–19, 34–18, 27–24
Scoring by half: 55–43, 61–42
Pts: Bryant 25; Rebs: James 9 Asts: James, Paul, Wade, Williams 3		Pts: Mills 20; Rebs: Worthington 6 Asts: Newley 3

Wukesong Indoor Stadium, Beijing
Attendance: 11,083
Referees: Juan Carlos Arteaga (ESP)

=== Women's tournament ===
Roster

The following is the Australia roster in the women's basketball tournament of the 2008 Summer Olympics.

Australia women's national basketball team – 2008 Summer Olympics roster
Players
Coaches

Pos.	No.	Name	Age – Date of birth	Height	Club	Ctr.
G	4	Erin Phillips	23 – July 19, 1985	5 ft 8 in (1.73 m)	Connecticut Sun	(United States)
G	5	Tully Bevilaqua	36 – May 19, 1972	5 ft 5 in (1.65 m)	Indiana Fever	(United States)
G	6	Jennifer Screen	26 – February 19, 1982	5 ft 11 in (1.8 m)	Lavezzini Basket Parma	(Italy)
F	7	Penny Taylor	27 – May 24, 1981	6 ft 0 in (1.83 m)	Phoenix Mercury	(United States)
F/C	8	Suzy Batkovic	27 – May 24, 1981	6 ft 5 in (1.96 m)	UMMC Ekaterinburg	(Russia)
C	9	Hollie Grima	24 – December 16, 1983	6 ft 2 in (1.88 m)	Italmoka Pozzuoli	(Italy)
PG	10	Kristi Harrower	33 – March 4, 1975	5 ft 4 in (1.63 m)	UMMC Ekaterinburg	(Russia)
F	11	Laura Summerton	24 – December 13, 1983	6 ft 2 in (1.88 m)	Levoni Taranto	(Italy)
F	12	Belinda Snell	27 – January 10, 1981	6 ft 0 in (1.83 m)	CJM Bourges Basket	(France)
C	13	Emma Randall	23 – May 6, 1985	6 ft 2 in (1.88 m)	Bulleen Boomers	(Australia)
F	14	Rohanee Cox	28 – April 23, 1980	6 ft 6 in (1.98 m)	Townsville Fire	(Australia)
PF	15	Lauren Jackson (C)	27 – May 11, 1981	6 ft 5 in (1.96 m)	Seattle Storm	(United States)

Head coach

- (Australia) Jan Stirling

Legend

- (C) Team captain
- Club – describes last
  club before the tournament
- Age – describes age
  on August 9, 2008

Group play

Pos	Team	Pld	W	L	PF	PA	PD	Pts	Qualification
1	Australia	5	5	0	424	319	+105	10	Quarterfinals
2	Russia	5	4	1	339	333	+6	9	Quarterfinals
3	Belarus	5	2	3	324	332	−8	7 (Note: Head-to-head record: Belarus 1–0 South Korea)	Quarterfinals
4	South Korea	5	2	3	327	360	−33	7	Quarterfinals
5	Latvia	5	1	4	334	387	−53	6 (Note: Head-to-head record: Latvia 1–0 Brazil)	
6	Brazil	5	1	4	337	354	−17	6	

Source: FIBA archive
Rules for classification: 1) points; 2) head-to-head points; 3) head-to-head goal average; 4) head-to-head number of points scored.
Notes:

9 August 2008
09:00

Report

Belarus	64–83	Australia
Scoring by quarter: 12–19, 16–25 , 22–21, 14–18
Pts: Leuchanka 13, Troina 13; Rebs: Leuchanka 10; Asts: Marchanka 2		Pts: Jackson 18; Rebs: Batkovic 12; Asts: Harrower 5

Wukesong Indoor Stadium, Beijing
Attendance: 11,083
Referees: Nikolaos Zavlanos (GRE)

11 August 2008
22:15

Report

Australia	80–65	Brazil
Scoring by quarter: 29–14, 21–15, 11–20, 19–16
Pts: Summerton 18; Rebs: Taylor 8 Asts: Harrower 5		Pts: Santos 21; Rebs: Santos 10; Asts: Santos 3

Wukesong Indoor Stadium, Beijing
Attendance: 11,083
Referees: Nikolaos Pitsilkas (GRE)

13 August 2008
20:00

Report

Australia	90–62	South Korea
Scoring by quarter: 23–14, 24–19, 26–17, 17–12
Pts: Taylor, Batkovic 18; Rebs: Batkovic 10; Asts: Harrower 5		Pts: Beon 20; Rebs: seven players 2 Asts: Lee 5

Wukesong Indoor Stadium, Beijing
Attendance: 11,083
Referees: Romualdas Brazauskas (LTU)

15 August 2008
11:15

Report

Latvia	73–96	Australia
Scoring by quarter: 18–19, 20–22, 18–35, 17–20
Pts: Tāre 14; Rebs: Brumermane, Jansone 5 Asts: Tāre 4		Pts: Jackson 30; Rebs: Taylor 11; Asts: Harrower, Taylor 4

Wukesong Indoor Stadium, Beijing
Attendance: 11,083
Referees: Pablo Estevez (ARG)

17 August 2008
11:15

Report

Australia	75–55	Russia
Scoring by quarter: 15–19, 10–18, 30–10, 20–8
Pts: Snell, Jackson 16; Rebs: Jackson 14; Asts: Harrower 7		Pts: Hammon 20; Rebs: Abrosimova, Osipova 9 Asts: Karpunina 2

Wukesong Indoor Stadium, Beijing
Attendance: 11,083
Referees: Pablo Estevez (ARG)

Quarterfinals

19 August 2008
16:45

Report

Australia	79–46	Czech Republic
Scoring by quarter: 23–10, 15–7, 23–10, 17–19
Pts: Jackson 17; Rebs: Jackson 12; Asts: Harrower 4		Pts: Vecerova, Machova 8 Rebs: Kulichova 5 Asts: Machova 4

Wukesong Indoor Stadium, Beijing
Attendance: 11,083
Referees: Romualdas Brazauskas (LTU)

Semifinals

21 August 2008
22:15

Report

China	56–90	Australia
Scoring by quarter: 11–13, 7–21, 21–23, 17–33
Pts: Bian 20; Rebs: Liu, Sui 7 Asts: Bian 2		Pts: Snell 16; Rebs: Batkovic 13; Asts: Harrower, Snell 4

Wukesong Indoor Stadium, Beijing
Attendance: 11,083
Referees: Chantal Julien (FRA)

Gold medal match

23 August 2008
22:00

Report

(gold) United States	92–65	Australia (silver)
Scoring by quarter: 22–15, 25–15, 22–24, 23–11
Pts: Lawson 15; Rebs: Leslie 7 Asts: Thompson 4		Pts: Jackson 20; Rebs: Jackson 10; Asts: Grima 2

Wukesong Indoor Stadium, Beijing
Attendance: 11,083
Referees: Nikolaos Zavlanos (GRE)

== Boxing ==
Australia had nine boxers qualify for the Olympics. All qualified at the Oceanian qualifying tournament.

Athlete	Event	Round of 32	Round of 16	Quarterfinals	Semifinals	Final	
Athlete	Event	Opposition Result	Opposition Result	Opposition Result	Opposition Result	Opposition Result	Rank
Stephen Sutherland	Flyweight	Cherif (CHI); L 2–14	Did not advance				
Luke Boyd	Bantamweight	Ikgopoleng (BOT); L 8–18	Did not advance				
Paul Fleming	Featherweight	Djelkhir (FRA); L 9–13	Did not advance				
Anthony Little	Lightweight	Indongo (NAM); W 14–2	Tishchenko (RUS); L 3–11	Did not advance			
Todd Kidd	Light welterweight	Moussaid (MAR); L 2–23	Did not advance				
Gerard O'Mahony	Welterweight	Gruşac (MDA); L 2–7	Did not advance				
Jarrod Fletcher	Middleweight	Correa (CUB); L 4–17	Did not advance				
Bradley Pitt	Heavyweight	—N/a	Arjaoui (MAR); L 6–11	Did not advance			
Daniel Beahan	Super heavyweight	—N/a	Myrsatayev (KAZ); L RSC	Did not advance			

== Canoeing ==
=== Slalom ===
Athlete	Event	Preliminary						Semifinal		Final			
Athlete	Event	Run 1	Rank	Run 2	Rank	Total	Rank	Time	Rank	Time	Rank	Total	Rank
Robin Bell	Men's C-1	88.86	6	87.59	9	176.45	7 Q	91.16	5 Q	89.43	3	180.59	3rd place, bronze medalist(s)
Warwick Draper	Men's K-1	86.28	13	86.30	9	172.58	10 Q	86.09	2 Q	91.76	8	177.85	5
Mark Bellofiore; Lachie Milne	Men's C-2	104.61	11	98.21	7	202.82	9 Q	104.17	7	Did not advance			
Jacqueline Lawrence	Women's K-1	103.18	10	96.95	6	200.13	7 Q	103.40	4	103.54	2	206.94	2nd place, silver medalist(s)

=== Sprint ===
Men

Athlete	Event	Heats		Semifinals		Final	
Athlete	Event	Time	Rank	Time	Rank	Time	Rank
Torsten Lachmann	C-1 500 m	2:00.594	7 QS	1:59.119	7	Did not advance	
Torsten Lachmann	C-1 1000 m	4:15.188	5 QS	4:09.792	6	Did not advance	
Ken Wallace	K-1 500 m	1:36.208	2 QS	1:43.340	3 Q	1:37.252	1st place, gold medalist(s)
Ken Wallace	K-1 1000 m	3:30.306	2 QS	3:33.255	1 Q	3:27.485	3rd place, bronze medalist(s)
Jacob Clear; Clint Robinson	K-2 500 m	1:31.712	6 QS	1:33.839	7	Did not advance	
Clint Robinson; Tony Schumacher; Dave Smith; Tate Smith	K-4 1000 m	3:00.920	5 QS	3:02.743	4	Did not advance	

Women

Athlete	Event	Heats		Semifinals		Final	
Athlete	Event	Time	Rank	Time	Rank	Time	Rank
Chantal Meek	K-1 500 m	1:53.374	5 QS	1:54.876	7	Did not advance	
Hannah Davis; Lyndsie Fogarty	K-2 500 m	1:45.124	3 QF	Bye		1:43.969	6
Hannah Davis; Lyndsie Fogarty; Chantal Meek; Lisa Oldenhof	K-4 500 m	1:36.516	3 QF	Bye		1:34.704	3rd place, bronze medalist(s)

Qualification Legend: QS = Qualify to semi-final; QF = Qualify directly to final

== Cycling ==
Australia selected competitors in all four cycling disciplines – BMX, mountain biking, road racing and track racing. Mountain biker Chris Jongewaard lost his legal appeal to be included in the team after being excluded because of a car accident, involving another cyclist for which he was due to face court in late 2008.

=== Road ===
Men

Athlete	Event	Time	Rank
Cadel Evans	Road race	6:24:11	15
Cadel Evans	Time trial	1:03:34	5
Simon Gerrans	Road race	6:26:17	37
Matthew Lloyd	Road race	6:26:17	31
Stuart O'Grady	Road race	Did not finish	
Michael Rogers	Road race	6:23:49	6
Michael Rogers	Time trial	1:04:46	8

Women

Athlete	Event	Time	Rank
Katherine Bates	Road race	Did not finish	
Sara Carrigan	Road race	3:33:25	38
Oenone Wood	Road race	3:33:17	29
Oenone Wood	Time trial	38:53.45	22

=== Track ===
Sprint

Athlete	Event	Qualification		Round 1	Repechage 1	Round 2	Repechage 2	Quarterfinals	Semifinals	Final	
Athlete	Event	Time Speed (km/h)	Rank	Opposition Time Speed (km/h)	Opposition Time Speed (km/h)	Opposition Time Speed (km/h)	Opposition Time Speed (km/h)	Opposition Time Speed (km/h)	Opposition Time Speed (km/h)	Opposition Time Speed (km/h)	Rank
Ryan Bayley	Men's sprint	10.362; 69.484	12 Q	Awang (MAS); W 10.762; 66.902	Bye	Levy (GER); L	Sireau (FRA); Watanabe (JPN); L	Did not advance		9th place final Nimke (GER); Chiappa (ITA); Watanabe (JPN); L	11
Mark French	Men's sprint	10.337; 69.652	10 Q	Bos (NED); L	Mulder (NED); Dmitriev (RUS); L	Did not advance					
Anna Meares	Women's sprint	11.140; 64.631	3	Hijgenaar (NED); W 11.663; 61.733	Bye	—N/a		Sanchez (FRA); W 11.716, W 12.108	Guo (CHN); L, W 11.578, W 11.617	Pendleton (GBR); L, L	2nd place, silver medalist(s)
Ryan Bayley; Dan Ellis; Mark French; Shane Kelly*	Men's team sprint	44.335; 60.899	5 Q	Netherlands; W 44.090; 61.238	—N/a					Germany; L 44.022; 61.332	4

* Qualified only in the first round

Pursuit

Athlete	Event	Qualification		Semifinals		Final	
Athlete	Event	Time	Rank	Opponent Results	Rank	Opponent Results	Rank
Bradley McGee	Men's individual pursuit	4:26.084	9	Did not advance			
Brett Lancaster	Men's individual pursuit	4:26.139	12	Did not advance			
Katie Mactier	Women's individual pursuit	3:38.178	7 Q	Romero (GBR); 3:37.296	7	Did not advance	
Jack Bobridge; Graeme Brown; Mark Jamieson; Brett Lancaster; Bradley McGee; Luke Roberts	Men's team pursuit	4:02.041	3 Q	Netherlands; 3:58.633	4 Q	New Zealand; 3:59.006	4

Keirin

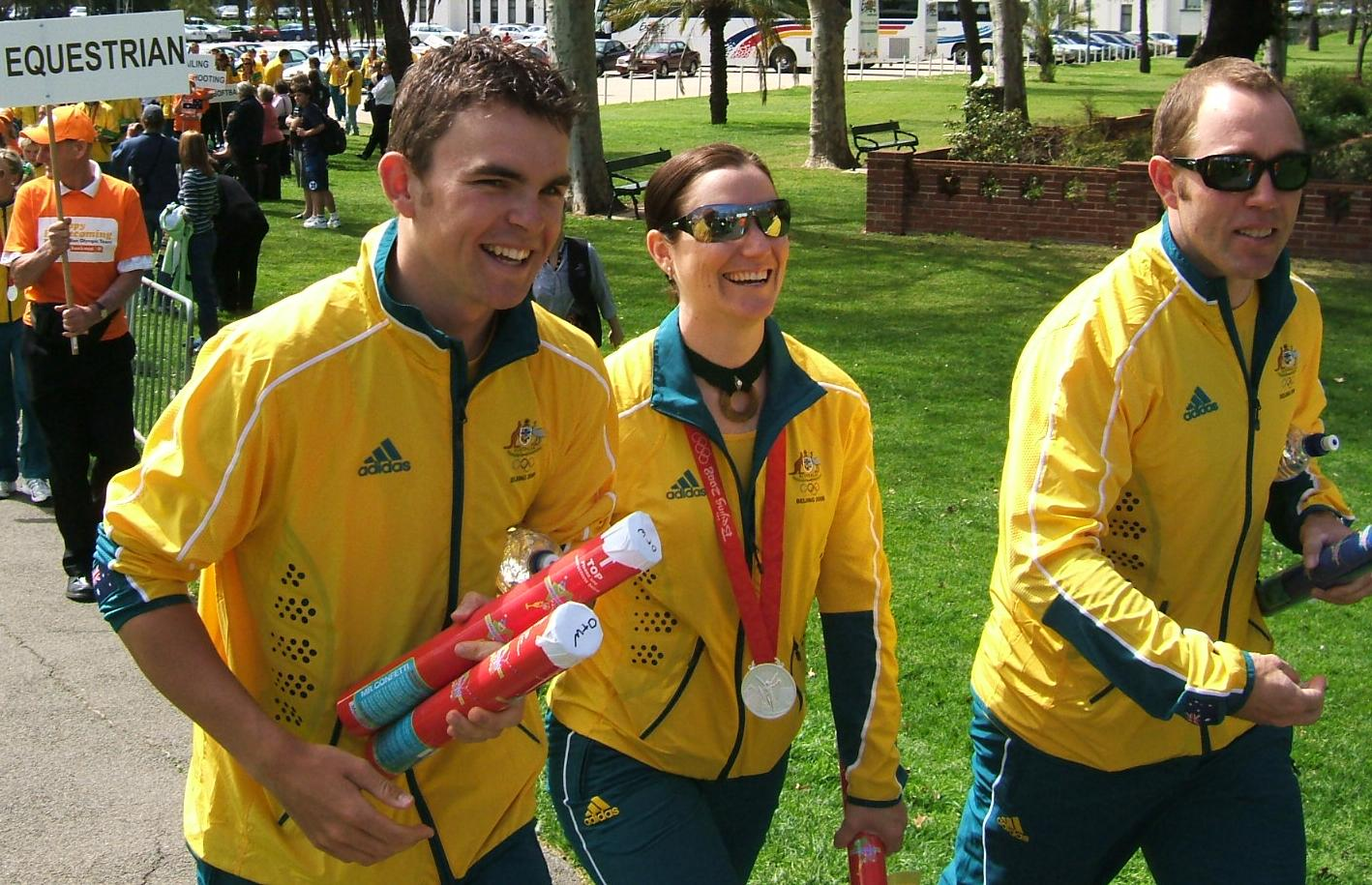
Australian track cyclists Jack Bobridge, Anna Meares and Shane Kelly.

Athlete	Event	1st round	Repechage	2nd round	Final
Athlete	Event	Rank	Rank	Rank	Rank
Ryan Bayley	Men's keirin	1 Q	Bye	6	8
Shane Kelly	Men's keirin	2 Q	Bye	2 Q	4

Omnium

Athlete	Event	Points	Laps	Rank
Cameron Meyer	Men's points race	36	1	4
Katherine Bates	Women's points race	10	0	6

=== Mountain biking ===
Athlete	Event	Time	Rank
Daniel McConnell	Men's cross-country	LAP (2 laps)	39
Dellys Starr	Women's cross-country	LAP (2 laps)	26

=== BMX ===
Athlete	Event	Seeding		Quarterfinals		Semifinals		Final	
Athlete	Event	Result	Rank	Points	Rank	Points	Rank	Result	Rank
Jared Graves	Men's BMX	36.372	11	4	1 Q	10	3 Q	2:19.233	6
Kamakazi	Men's BMX	36.492	15	13	4 Q	18	6	Did not advance	
Luke Madill	Men's BMX	36.795	22	18	7	Did not advance			
Tanya Bailey	Women's BMX	38.285	10	—N/a		22	8	Did not advance	
Nicole Callisto	Women's BMX	36.717	6	—N/a		12	4 Q	1:19.609	6

== Diving ==
Australia selected a team of nine divers to compete at the 2008 Olympics:

Men

Athlete	Events	Preliminaries		Semifinals		Final	
Athlete	Events	Points	Rank	Points	Rank	Points	Rank
Matthew Mitcham	3 m springboard	439.85	15 Q	427.45	16	Did not advance	
Robert Newbery	3 m springboard	465.15	6 Q	460.35	11 Q	461.05	9
Mathew Helm	10 m platform	484.40	5 Q	485.20	6 Q	467.70	6
Matthew Mitcham	10 m platform	509.60	2 Q	532.20	2 Q	537.00	1st place, gold medalist(s)
Robert Newbery; Scott Robertson	3 m synchronised springboard	—N/a				393.60	8
Mathew Helm; Robert Newbery	10 m synchronised platform	—N/a				444.84	4

Women

Athlete	Events	Preliminaries		Semifinals		Final	
Athlete	Events	Points	Rank	Points	Rank	Points	Rank
Chantelle Newbery	3 m springboard	284.85	15 Q	294.45	14	Did not advance	
Sharleen Stratton	3 m springboard	288.00	13 Q	325.90	8 Q	331.00	7
Alex Croak	10 m platform	383.75	4 Q	250.30	18	Did not advance	
Melissa Wu	10 m platform	340.35	8 Q	331.35	8 Q	338.15	6
Briony Cole; Sharleen Stratton	3 m synchronised springboard	—N/a				311.34	5
Briony Cole; Melissa Wu	10 m synchronised platform	—N/a				335.16	2nd place, silver medalist(s)

== Equestrian ==
Australia selected a team of twelve equestrians to compete at the 2008 Olympics. Hayley Beresford, Kristy Oatley and Heath Ryan competed in dressage. Edwina Alexander, Laurie Lever, Peter McMahon and Matt Williams were selected for the jumping competition. Clayton Fredericks, Lucinda Fredericks, Sonja Johnson, Megan Jones and Shane Rose were selected for the three-day event.

=== Dressage ===
Athlete	Horse	Event	Grand Prix		Grand Prix Special		Grand Prix Freestyle		Overall	
Athlete	Horse	Event	Score	Rank	Score	Rank	Score	Rank	Score	Rank
Hayley Beresford	Remlampago	Individual	65.583	26 Q	66.320	19	Did not advance			
Kristy Oatley	Quando Quando	Individual	65.750	25 Q	66.080	20	Did not advance			
Heath Ryan	Greenoaks Dundee	Individual	62.541	35	Did not advance					
Hayley Beresford; Kristy Oatley; Heath Ryan	See above	Team	64.625	8	—N/a				64.625	7

=== Eventing ===
Athlete	Horse	Event	Dressage		Cross-country			Jumping						Total	
Athlete	Horse	Event	Dressage		Cross-country			Qualifier			Final			Total	
Athlete	Horse	Event	Penalties	Rank	Penalties	Total	Rank	Penalties	Total	Rank	Penalties	Total	Rank	Penalties	Rank
Clayton Fredericks	Ben Along Time	Individual	37.00	6	16.40	53.40	4	4.00	57.40	=6 Q	4.00	61.40	7	61.40	7
Lucinda Fredericks	Headley Britannia	Individual	30.40	1	27.20	57.60	11	2.00	59.60 #	10*	Did not advance			59.60	26
Sonja Johnson	Ringwould Jaguar	Individual	45.20 #	23	13.60	58.80 #	13	0.00	58.80	9 Q	8.00	66.80	10	66.80	10
Megan Jones	Irish Jester	Individual	35.40	4	15.60	51.00	9	4.00	55.00	3	4.00	59.00	4 Q	59.00	4
Shane Rose	All Luck	Individual	53.30 #	46	9.20	62.50 #	16	8.00	70.50 #	17*	Did not advance			70.50	27
Clayton Fredericks; Lucinda Fredericks; Sonja Johnson; Megan Jones; Shane Rose	See above	Team	102.80	1	59.20	162.00	2	9.20	171.20	2	—N/a			171.20	2nd place, silver medalist(s)

# - Indicates that points do not count in team total
* Only three riders are eligible to qualify for the jumping final.

=== Show jumping ===
Athlete	Horse	Event	Qualification								Final					Total	
Athlete	Horse	Event	Round 1		Round 2			Round 3			Round A		Round B			Total	
Athlete	Horse	Event	Penalties	Rank	Penalties	Total	Rank	Penalties	Total	Rank	Penalties	Rank	Penalties	Total	Rank	Penalties	Rank
Edwina Alexander	Itot Du Chateau	Individual	4	=30	0	4	=8 Q	0	4	=2 Q	4	=11 Q	4	8	=10	8	=10
Laurie Lever	Dan Drossel	Individual	1	=14	16	17	=37 Q	4	21	=29 Q	8	=23	Did not advance			8	=23
Peter McMahon	Genoa	Individual	4	=30	16	20	=47 Q	Did not start									
Matt Williams	Leconte	Individual	4	=30	4	8	=16 Q	17	25	36 Q	4	=11 Q	20	24	21	24	21
Edwina Alexander; Laurie Lever; Peter McMahon; Matt Williams	See above	Team	—N/a								20	=8 Q	21	41	9	41	8

== Fencing ==
Two fencers will represent Australia in Beijing. Jo Halls will contest the women's individual foil while Amber Parkinson will contest the women's individual épée.

Women

Athlete	Event	Round of 64	Round of 32	Round of 16	Quarterfinal	Semifinal	Final / BM	
Athlete	Event	Opposition Score	Opposition Score	Opposition Score	Opposition Score	Opposition Score	Opposition Score	Rank
Amber Parkinson	Individual épée	—N/a	Harada (JPN); L 9–15	Did not advance				
Joanna Halls	Individual foil	Compañy (CUB); L 13–15	Did not advance					

== Field hockey ==
The Australian men's and women's field hockey teams both qualified for Beijing. The men's team won the bronze medal, while the women's team finished in 5th place for the tournament.

=== Men's tournament ===
Roster

The following is the Australian roster in the men's field hockey tournament of the 2008 Summer Olympics.

Head Coach: Barry Dancer

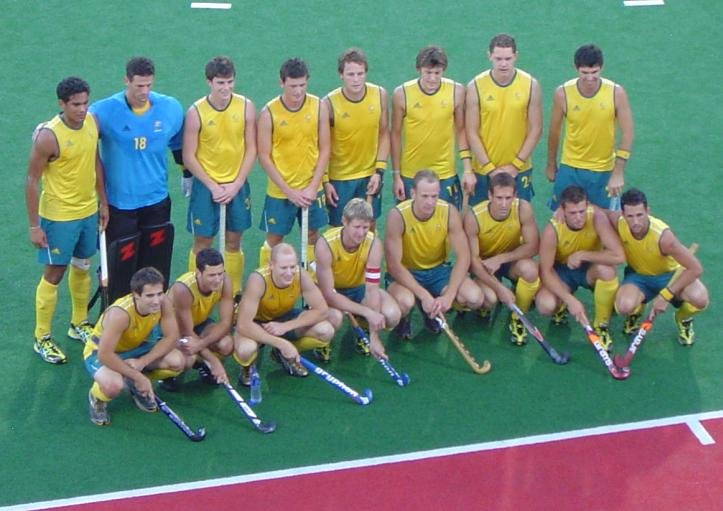
Australia's team just before the group stage match against Pakistan. Standing from the left: Abbott, Lambert, Kavanagh, Matheson, Guest, Ockenden, Brooks, Wells. Front row from the left: Brown, Dwyer, Hammond, George, Doerner, de Young, Schubert, Knowles.

1. Jamie Dwyer
2. Liam de Young
6. Robert Hammond
9. Mark Knowles
11. Eddie Ockenden
12. David Guest
13. Luke Doerner
14. Grant Schubert
15. Bevan George (c)
18. Stephen Lambert (GK)
19. Eli Matheson
23. Matthew Wells
24. Travis Brooks
28. Kiel Brown
31. Fergus Kavanagh
32. Des Abbott

Reserve:

17. Andrew Smith
30. Stephen Mowlam (GK)

Group play

The top two teams from each group advanced to the semifinals.

Pos	Team	Pld	W	D	L	GF	GA	GD	Pts	Qualification
1	Netherlands	5	4	1	0	16	6	+10	13	Semi-finals
2	Australia	5	3	2	0	24	7	+17	11	Semi-finals
3	Great Britain	5	2	2	1	10	7	+3	8	Fifth place game
4	Pakistan	5	2	0	3	11	13	−2	6	Seventh place game
5	Canada	5	1	1	3	10	17	−7	4	Ninth place game
6	South Africa	5	0	0	5	4	25	−21	0	Eleventh place game

11 August 2008
18:30

Australia	6–1	Canada
Abbott 15', 16', 54'; Kavanagh 22'; Ockenden 48'; Schubert 57'	Report	P. Short 38'

Umpires:
Christian Blasch (GER)
Chen Dekang (CHN)

13 August 2008
08:30

South Africa	0–10	Australia
	Report	Dwyer 2', 42'; Matheson 14', 29', 57'; Schubert 27'; Guest 35+', 38'; Kavanagh 47'; Abbott 67'

Umpires:
Andy Mair (GBR)
Roel van Eert (NED)

15 August 2008
18:30

Pakistan	1–3	Australia
Abbasi 16'	Report	Schubert 20'; Dwyer 41'; Brooks 59'

Umpires:
Henrik Ehlers (DEN)
Gary Simmonds (RSA)

17 August 2008
20:30

Australia	2–2	Netherlands
Ockenden 58'; Doerner 61'	Report	Taekema 55', 70'

Umpires:
Henrik Ehlers (DEN)
Christian Blasch (GER)

19 August 2008
20:30

Australia	3–3	Great Britain
George 40'; Dwyer 45'; Ockenden 68'	Report	Middleton 34'; R. Mantell 47'; Moore 55'

Umpires:
Christian Blasch (GER)
Xavier Adell (ESP)

Semifinal

21 August 2008
20:30

Spain	3−2	Australia
Tubau 39', 44'; Freixa 68'	Report	Abbott 1'; Ockenden 37'

Umpires:
Henrik Ehlers (DEN)
Christian Blasch (GER)

Bronze medal match

23 August 2008
18:00

Netherlands	2–6	Australia (bronze)
Taekema 12'; De Nooijer 27'	Report	Ockenden 5', 6'; Abbott 9'; Matheson 28'; Hammond 42'; Doerner 62'

Umpires:
Andy Mair (GBR)
Christian Blasch (GER)

=== Women's tournament ===
Roster

The following is the Australian roster in the women's field hockey tournament of the 2008 Summer Olympics.

Head Coach: Frank Murray

4. Casey Eastham
6. Megan Rivers
7. Kim Walker
10. Kate Hollywood
11. Emily Halliday
12. Madonna Blyth
14. Nicole Arrold
15. Kobie McGurk
16. Fiona Johnson
17. Rachel Imison (GK)
24. Angie Skirving
25. Melanie Twitt (c) (Note: Melanie Wells and Nikki Hudson were co-captains of the Australian team.)
28. Hope Munro
29. Teneal Attard
30. Sarah Taylor
32. Nikki Hudson (c)

Reserve:

1. Toni Cronk (GK)
13. Shelly Liddelow

Notes

Group play

The top two teams from each group advanced to the semifinals. Australia were eliminated on goal difference with China and entered the playoff for 5th/6th place.

Team	Pld	W	D	L	GF	GA	GD	Pts	Qualification
Netherlands	5	5	0	0	14	3	+11	15	Advanced to semifinals
China	5	3	1	1	14	4	+10	10	Advanced to semifinals
Australia	5	3	1	1	17	9	+8	10	
Spain	5	2	0	3	4	12	−8	6	
South Korea	5	1	0	4	13	18	−5	3	
South Africa	5	0	0	5	2	18	−16	0	

10 August 2008
18:00

Australia	5–4	South Korea
Liddelow 25', 50'; Hudson 47'; Young 56'; Eastham 65'	Report	Kim Mi-sun 18'; Kim Da-rae 27'; Gim Sung-hee 32'; Park Mi-hyun 34'

Umpires:
Soledad Iparruguirre (ARG)
Stella Bartlema (NED)

12 August 2008
10:30

Australia	6–1	Spain
Lambert 27', 60'; Hudson 47'; Eastham 54'; Halliday 66'; Rivers 70'	Report	Muñoz 6'

Umpires:
Chieko Soma (JPN)
Miao Lin (CHN)

14 August 2008
20:30

South Africa	0–3	Australia
	Report	Hudson 10'; Lambert 44'; Eastham 62'

Umpires:
Carol Metchette (IRL)
Ute Conen (GER)

16 August 2008
10:30

Australia	1–2	Netherlands
Young 17'	Report	Paumen 20', 46'

Umpires:
Sarah Garnett (NZL)
Marelize de Klerk (RSA)

18 August 2008
21:00

China	2–2	Australia
Li Hongxia 30', 38'	Report	Eastham 51'; Young 62'

Umpires:
Chieko Soma (JPN)
Carolina de la Fuente (ARG)

Classification match for 5th/6th place

22 August 2008
11:00

Australia	2–0	Great Britain
Blyth 29'; Munro 68'	Report

Umpires:
Sarah Garnett (NZL)
Miao Lin (CHN)

== Football (soccer) ==
=== Men's tournament ===
Australia's under-23 football team, commonly referred to as the 'Olyroos', qualified for the 2008 Summer Olympics.

Roster

The following is the Australia squad in the men's football tournament of the 2008 Summer Olympics.

Head coach: Graham Arnold

No.	Pos.	Player	Date of birth (age)	Caps	Goals	Club
1	GK	Adam Federici	31 January 1985 (aged 23)	0	0	(The Football Association) Reading
2	DF	Jade North*	7 January 1982 (aged 26)	0	0	(Football Australia) Newcastle Jets
3	DF	Adrian Leijer	25 March 1986 (aged 22)	20	1	(The Football Association) Fulham
4	DF	Mark Milligan (c)	4 August 1985 (aged 23)	18	5	(Football Australia) Newcastle Jets
5	DF	Matthew Špiranović	27 June 1988 (aged 20)	1	0	(German Football Association) FC Nurnberg
6	DF	Nikolai Topor-Stanley	11 March 1985 (aged 23)	21	4	(Football Australia) Perth Glory
7	MF	Neil Kilkenny	19 December 1985 (aged 22)	6	0	(The Football Association) Leeds United
8	MF	Stuart Musialik	29 March 1985 (aged 23)	12	0	(Football Australia) Sydney FC
9	FW	Mark Bridge	7 November 1985 (aged 22)	17	3	(Football Australia) Sydney FC
10	FW	Archie Thompson*	23 October 1978 (aged 29)	0	0	(Football Australia) Melbourne Victory
11	MF	David Carney*	30 November 1983 (aged 24)	0	0	(The Football Association) Sheffield United
12	DF	Trent McClenahan	4 February 1985 (aged 23)	12	0	(The Football Association) Hereford United
13	MF	Ruben Zadkovich	23 May 1986 (aged 22)	19	1	(The Football Association) Derby County
14	MF	James Troisi	3 July 1988 (aged 20)	7	2	(Turkish Football Federation) Gençlerbirliği
15	MF	Kristian Sarkies	25 October 1986 (aged 21)	16	7	(Football Australia) Adelaide United
16	MF	Billy Celeski	14 July 1985 (aged 23)	6	0	(Football Australia) Melbourne Victory
17	FW	Nikita Rukavytsya	22 June 1987 (aged 21)	6	1	(Football Australia) Perth Glory
18	GK	Tando Velaphi	17 April 1987 (aged 21)	6	0	(Football Australia) Perth Glory
21	FW	Matt Simon (Note: Replaces Archie Thompson who was injured during the competition)	22 January 1986 (aged 22)	0	0	(Football Australia) Central Coast Mariners

* Over-aged player.

Notes

Group play

Pos	Team	Pld	W	D	L	GF	GA	GD	Pts	Qualification
1	Argentina	3	3	0	0	5	1	+4	9	Qualified for the quarterfinals
2	Ivory Coast	3	2	0	1	6	4	+2	6	Qualified for the quarterfinals
3	Australia	3	0	1	2	1	3	−2	1	
4	Serbia	3	0	1	2	3	7	−4	1	

7 August 2008
17:00

Australia	1–1	Serbia
Zadkovich 69'	Report	Rajković 78'

Shanghai Stadium, Shanghai
Attendance: 36,184
Referee: Jerome Damon (South Africa)
10 August 2008
17:00

Argentina	1–0	Australia
Lavezzi 76'	Report

Shanghai Stadium, Shanghai
Attendance: 38,182
Referee: Viktor Kassai (Hungary)
13 August 2008
19:45

Ivory Coast	1–0	Australia
Kalou 81'	Report

Tianjin Olympic Center Stadium, Tianjin
Attendance: 50,437
Referee: Jair Marrufo (United States)

== Gymnastics ==
Australian gymnasts qualified for Beijing in all three categories: artistic, rhythmic and trampoline. Naazmi Johnston was the only rhythmic gymnast to qualify. Ben Wilden was the only trampolinist selected in the squad and Samuel Simpson was the only male artistic gymnast but a full women's artistic gymnastic team of six qualified:

=== Artistic ===
Men

Athlete	Event	Qualification								Final							
Athlete	Event	Apparatus						Total	Rank	Apparatus						Total	Rank
Athlete	Event	F	PH	R	V	PB	HB	Total	Rank	F	PH	R	V	PB	HB	Total	Rank
Samuel Simpson	All-around	14.550	14.000	13.800	15.600	14.200	13.475	85.625	39	Did not advance							

Women

Athlete	Event	Qualification						Final					
Athlete	Event	Apparatus				Total	Rank	Apparatus				Total	Rank
Athlete	Event	F	V	UB	BB	Total	Rank	F	V	UB	BB	Total	Rank
Georgia Bonora	Team	14.525	14.850	14.500	15.025	58.900	18 Q	14.450	14.625	—N/a			
Ashleigh Brennan	Team	14.625	14.775	13.700	14.150	57.250	30	14.650	—N/a		15.125	—N/a	
Daria Joura	Team	13.450	15.100	15.125	12.475	56.150	44	—N/a		14.675	—N/a		
Lauren Mitchell	Team	14.650	14.725	—N/a	14.100	—N/a		13.675	14.700	—N/a	15.550	—N/a	
Shona Morgan	Team	14.525	14.700	14.500	15.350	59.075	15 Q	—N/a	14.825	13.800	15.225	—N/a	
Olivia Vivian	Team	—N/a		14.925	—N/a			—N/a		15.100	—N/a		
Total	Team	58.625	59.450	58.325	59.050	235.450	5 Q	42.775	44.150	43.575	45.900	176.400	6

Individual finals

Athlete	Event	Apparatus				Total	Rank
Athlete	Event	F	V	UB	BB	Total	Rank
Georgia Bonora	All-around	14.375	14.850	14.625	15.100	58.950	13
Shona Morgan	All-around	14.425	14.650	14.625	15.100	58.800	15

=== Rhythmic ===
Athlete	Event	Qualification						Final					
Athlete	Event	Rope	Hoop	Clubs	Ribbon	Total	Rank	Rope	Hoop	Clubs	Ribbon	Total	Rank
Naazmi Johnston	Individual	15.300	14.075	14.825	14.800	59.000	22	Did not advance					

=== Trampoline ===
Athlete	Event	Qualification		Final	
Athlete	Event	Score	Rank	Score	Rank
Ben Wilden	Men's	67.10	13	Did not advance	

== Judo ==
Australia has selected a team of 13 for the 2008 Games:

Men

Athlete	Event	Preliminary	Round of 32	Round of 16	Quarterfinals	Semifinals	Repechage 1	Repechage 2	Repechage 3	Final / BM	
Athlete	Event	Opposition Result	Opposition Result	Opposition Result	Opposition Result	Opposition Result	Opposition Result	Opposition Result	Opposition Result	Opposition Result	Rank
Matthew D'Aquino	−60 kg	Bye	Alexanidis (GRE); L 0000–1000	Did not advance							
Steven Brown	−66 kg	Bye	Benamadi (ALG); L 0000–1010	Did not advance							
Dennis Iverson	−73 kg	—N/a	Huysuz (TUR); L 0000–1000	Did not advance							
Mark Anthony	−81 kg	Bye	Valles (COL); L 0000–1010	Did not advance							
Daniel Kelly	−90 kg	—N/a	Izumi (JPN); L 0000–0010	Did not advance							
Matt Celotti	−100 kg	—N/a	Despaigne (CUB); L 0000–0010	Did not advance							
Semir Pepic	+100 kg	Bye	Ikhsangaliyev (KAZ); L 0000–0020	Did not advance							

Women

Athlete	Event	Round of 32	Round of 16	Quarterfinals	Semifinals	Repechage 1	Repechage 2	Repechage 3	Final / BM	
Athlete	Event	Opposition Result	Opposition Result	Opposition Result	Opposition Result	Opposition Result	Opposition Result	Opposition Result	Opposition Result	Rank
Tiffany Day	−48 kg	Bye	Pareto (ARG); L 0000–1000	Did not advance						
Kristie-Anne Ryder	−52 kg	Bye	Heylen (BEL); L 0000–1000	Did not advance						
Maria Pekli	−57 kg	Bye	Baczkó (HUN); W 0101–0100	Jelassi (TUN); W 1011–0000	Quintavalle (ITA); L 0002–0010	Bye			Quadros (BRA); L 0000–1000	5
Catherine Arlove	−63 kg	Krukower (ARG); L 0000–1000	Did not advance							
Stephanie Grant	−78 kg	Bye	Levesque (CAN); L 0000–1000	Did not advance						
Janelle Shepherd	+78 kg	Torrenti (ITA); W 0001–0000	Köppen (GER); W 0110–0000	Ortiz (CUB); L 0000–1000	Did not advance	Bye	Ramadan (EGY); L 0000–1000	Did not advance		

== Modern pentathlon ==
Alexander Parygin, who won Olympic gold in Atlanta while competing for Kazakhstan, was initially due to be Australia's only male competitor in the modern pentathlon. His qualification was overturned "on technical grounds" by the Court of Arbitration for Sport, when the Modern Pentathlon Association of Great Britain argued that he had failed to meet "eligibility criteria of 5,100 points at the relevant international competition, during the Olympic qualification period". Specifically, Parygin qualified for Beijing during a competition which lacked the equestrian event. There being no avenue of appeal, Parygin will not compete in Beijing.

Angie Darby made her Olympic debut as the only Australian female in the competition. Darby, having qualified in the same conditions as Parygin, had her participation in the Games open to question, but she eventually competed.

Athlete	Event	Shooting (10 m air pistol)			Fencing (épée one touch)			Swimming (200 m freestyle)			Riding (show jumping)			Running (3000 m)			Total points	Final rank
Athlete	Event	Points	Rank	MP Points	Results	Rank	MP points	Time	Rank	MP points	Penalties	Rank	MP points	Time	Rank	MP Points	Total points	Final rank
Angie Darby	Women's	164	36	904	12–23	=31	688	2:35.59	35	1056	28	7	1172	11:21.96	31	996	4816	35

== Rowing ==
For the first time, Australia qualified for every rowing event at an Olympics.

Men

Athlete	Event	Heats		Repechage		Quarterfinals		Semifinals		Final	
Athlete	Event	Time	Rank	Time	Rank	Time	Rank	Time	Rank	Time	Rank
Peter Hardcastle	Single sculls	7:17.74	2 QF	—N/a		7:00.09	3 SA/B	7:32.79	6 FB	7:27.34	12
Duncan Free; Drew Ginn	Pair	6:41.15	1 SA/B	Bye		—N/a		6:34.29	1 FA	6:37.44	1st place, gold medalist(s)
Scott Brennan; David Crawshay	Double sculls	6:21.39	1 SA/B	Bye		—N/a		6:21.50	1 FA	6:27.77	1st place, gold medalist(s)
Samuel Beltz; Tom Gibson	Lightweight double sculls	6:19.15	3 R	6:42.42	2 SA/B	—N/a		6:32.32	5 FB	6:30.11	10
Francis Hegerty; James Marburg; Cameron McKenzie-McHarg; Matt Ryan	Four	6:00.40	1 SA/B	Bye		—N/a		5:56.20	2 FA	6:07.85	2nd place, silver medalist(s)
Brendan Long; James McRae; Chris Morgan; Daniel Noonan	Quadruple sculls	5:36.20	1 SA/B	Bye		—N/a		5:52.93	2 FA	5:44.68	4
Rod Chisholm; Ben Cureton; Anthony Edwards; Todd Skipworth	Lightweight four	5:55.18	3 SA/B	Bye		—N/a		6:12.38	4 FB	6:05.26	9
James Chapman; Sam Conrad; David Dennis; Tom Laurich; Samuel Loch; Marty Rabjohns (cox); Jeremy Stevenson; Stephen Stewart; James Tomkins	Eight	6:55.59	4 R	5:40.31	2 FA	—N/a				6:35.10	6

Women

Athlete	Event	Heats		Repechage		Quarterfinals		Semifinals		Final	
Athlete	Event	Time	Rank	Time	Rank	Time	Rank	Time	Rank	Time	Rank
Pippa Savage	Single sculls	7:57.95	2 QF	—N/a		7:34.03	3 SA/B	7:43.98	5 FB	7:53.43	10
Sarah Cook; Kim Crow	Pair	7:44.04	4 R	7:38.48	3 FB	—N/a				7:40.93	10
Sonia Mills; Catriona Sens	Double sculls	7:13.25	4 R	7:04.30	3 FB	—N/a				7:19.73	8
Amber Halliday; Marguerite Houston	Lightweight double sculls	6:53.23	2 SA/B	Bye		—N/a		7:13.80	5 FB	7:07.17	8
Amber Bradley; Kerry Hore; Amy Ives; Zoe Uphill	Quadruple sculls	6:20.95	4 R	6:41.39	3 FA	—N/a				6:30.05	6
Natalie Bale; Pauline Frasca; Sarah Heard; Kate Hornsey; Sally Kehoe; Elizabeth Kell; Elizabeth Patrick (cox); Brooke Pratley; Sarah Tait	Eight	6:07.93	3 R	6:14.45	4 FA	—N/a				6:14.22	6

Qualification Legend: FA=Final A (medal); FB=Final B (non-medal); FC=Final C (non-medal); FD=Final D (non-medal); FE=Final E (non-medal); FF=Final F (non-medal); SA/B=Semifinals A/B; SC/D=Semifinals C/D; SE/F=Semifinals E/F; QF=Quarterfinals; R=Repechage

== Sailing ==
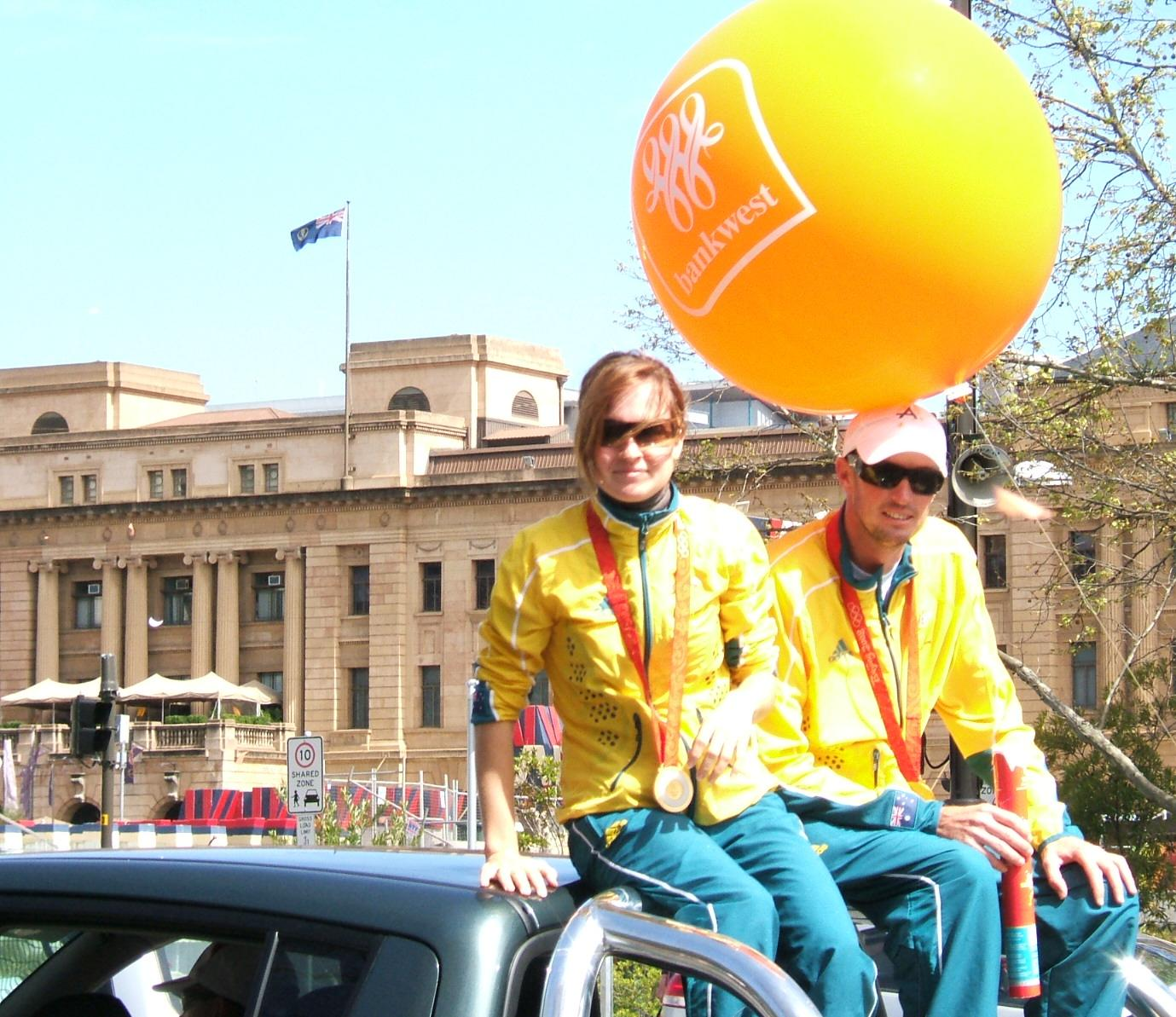
Australia won the 470 class in both men's and women's competition. Pictured here are Elise Rechichi and Nathan Wilmot, the respective skippers.

Australia competed in ten of the eleven sailing events.

Men

Athlete	Event	Race											Net points	Final rank
Athlete	Event	1	2	3	4	5	6	7	8	9	10	M*	Net points	Final rank
Tom Slingsby	Laser	21	22	21	22	35	20	12	11	~~40~~	CAN	EL	164	22
Malcolm Page; Nathan Wilmot	470	4	7	3	3	3	4	5	~~16~~	3	10	2	44	1st place, gold medalist(s)
Iain Murray; Andrew Palfrey	Star	11	~~15~~	13	15	2	11	10	14	14	8	EL	98	14

Women

Athlete	Event	Race											Net points	Final rank
Athlete	Event	1	2	3	4	5	6	7	8	9	10	M*	Net points	Final rank
Jessica Crisp	RS:X	2	4	3	8	1	8	9	~~14~~	6	5	20	66	5
Sarah Blanck	Laser Radial	6	11	7	~~19~~	4	12	8	1	5	CAN	4	58	4
Tessa Parkinson; Elise Rechichi	470	2	2	4	1	9	4	2	5	3	2	~~18~~	34	1st place, gold medalist(s)
Angela Farrell; Karyn Gojnich; Krystal Weir	Yngling	1	11	6	~~12~~	7	7	9	8	CAN	CAN	DSQ	71	10

Open

Athlete	Event	Race																Net points	Final rank
Athlete	Event	1	2	3	4	5	6	7	8	9	10	11	12	13	14	15	M*	Net points	Final rank
Anthony Nossiter	Finn	11	~~22~~	8	17	13	21	11	20	CAN	CAN	—N/a					EL	101	16
Ben Austin; Nathan Outteridge	49er	~~20~~	1	7	3	1	1	6	4	6	12	2	18	CAN	CAN	CAN	12	73	5
Glenn Ashby; Darren Bundock	Tornado	5	4	3	1	5	~~9~~	2	8	7	4	—N/a					10	49	2nd place, silver medalist(s)

M = Medal race; EL = Eliminated – did not advance into the medal race; CAN = Race cancelled; OCS = On the course side of the starting line; BFD – Black flag disqualification; DNF – Did not finish

== Shooting ==
Australia has selected a squad of seventeen sport shooters to contest the 2008 Olympic competition:

Men

Athlete	Event	Qualification		Final	
Athlete	Event	Points	Rank	Points	Rank
George Barton	Skeet	116	17	Did not advance	
Benjamin Burge	10 m air rifle	576	49	Did not advance	
Benjamin Burge	50 m rifle prone	588	40	Did not advance	
Benjamin Burge	50 m rifle 3 positions	1152	40	Did not advance	
Michael Diamond	Trap	119	5 Q	142 S/O 2	4
Craig Henwood	Trap	109	31	Did not advance	
Matthew Inabinet	10 m air rifle	579	47	Did not advance	
Matthew Inabinet	50 m rifle 3 positions	1141	45	Did not advance	
Russell Mark	Double trap	136	6 Q	181	5
David Moore	10 m air pistol	571	36	Did not advance	
David Moore	50 m pistol	546	35	Did not advance	
Warren Potent	50 m rifle prone	595	4 Q	700.5	3rd place, bronze medalist(s)
Bruce Quick	25 m rapid fire pistol	560	17	Did not advance	
Paul Rahman	Skeet	110	30	Did not advance	
Daniel Repacholi	10 m air pistol	573	32	Did not advance	
Daniel Repacholi	50 m pistol	540	41	Did not advance	

Women

Athlete	Event	Qualification		Final	
Athlete	Event	Points	Rank	Points	Rank
Dina Aspandiyarova	10 m air pistol	375	36	Did not advance	
Dina Aspandiyarova	25 m pistol	571	33	Did not advance	
Sue McCready	10 m air rifle	386	42	Did not advance	
Sue McCready	50 m rifle 3 positions	550	43	Did not advance	
Natalia Rahman	Skeet	66	11	Did not advance	
Stacy Roiall	Trap	62	14	Did not advance	
Robyn van Nus	10 m air rifle	384	44	Did not advance	
Robyn van Nus	50 m rifle 3 positions	566	40	Did not advance	
Lalita Yauhleuskaya	10 m air pistol	381	18	Did not advance	
Lalita Yauhleuskaya	25 m pistol	581	14	Did not advance	

== Softball ==
The Australian softball team has qualified for the 2008 Summer Olympics. The team selected to compete in the games is:

- Jodie Bowering
- Kylie Cronk
- Kelly Hardie
- Tanya Harding
- Sandy Lewis
- Simmone Morrow
- Tracey Mosley
- Stacey Porter
- Melanie Roche
- Justine Smethurst
- Danielle Stewart
- Natalie Titcume
- Natalie Ward
- Belinda Wright
- Kerry Wyborn

Group stage

Qualified for the semifinals
Eliminated

The top four teams will advance to the semifinal round.

Team	Pts	Pld	W	L	RS	RA	WIN%	GB
United States	14	7	7	0	53	1	1.000	-
Japan	12	7	6	1	23	13	.857	1
Australia	10	7	5	2	30	11	.714	2
Canada	6	7	3	4	17	23	.429	4
China	4	7	2	5	19	21	.286	5
Chinese Taipei	4	7	2	5	10	23	.286	5
Venezuela	4	7	2	5	15	35	.286	5
Netherlands	2	7	1	6	8	48	.143	6

2008-08-12
Japan	4–3	Australia
2008-08-13
United States	3–0	Australia
2008-08-14
Australia	3–1	China
2008-08-15
Australia	3–1	Chinese Taipei
2008-08-16
Australia	8–0	Netherlands
2008-08-17
Australia	4–0	Canada
2008-08-18
Australia	9–2	Venezuela

Semifinal

2008-08-20
Australia	5–3	Canada

Preliminary final

2008-08-20
Japan	4–3	Australia

== Swimming ==
Australia sent 43 swimmers to Beijing. The men's team won 3 silver and 3 bronze medals, while the women's team won 6 gold, 2 silver and 4 bronze medals and set 4 world records. The members of the swim team and their results were:

Men

Athlete	Event	Heat		Semifinal		Final	
Athlete	Event	Time	Rank	Time	Rank	Time	Rank
Leith Brodie	200 m individual medley	1:59.96	15 Q	2:00.57	14	Did not advance	
Ashley Callus	50 m freestyle	22.11	13 Q	21.68	3 Q	21.62	4
Ashley Delaney	100 m backstroke	54.08	9 Q	53.76	8 Q	53.31	5
Ashley Delaney	200 m backstroke	1:57.87	9 Q	1:57.73	10	Did not advance	
Grant Hackett	400 m freestyle	3:44.03	5 Q	—N/a		3:43.84	6
Grant Hackett	1500 m freestyle	14:38.92	1 Q	—N/a		14:41.53	2nd place, silver medalist(s)
Ky Hurst	10 km open water	—N/a				1:52:13.7	11
Andrew Lauterstein	100 m butterfly	51.37	6 Q	51.27	3 Q	51.12	3rd place, bronze medalist(s)
Kenrick Monk	200 m freestyle	1:48.17	22	Did not advance			
Travis Nederpelt	200 m butterfly	1:56.64	18	Did not advance			
Travis Nederpelt	400 m individual medley	4:15.37	14	—N/a		Did not advance	
Adam Pine	100 m butterfly	52.07	17	Did not advance			
Brenton Rickard	100 m breaststroke	59.89	4 Q	59.65	3 Q	59.74	5
Brenton Rickard	200 m breaststroke	2:11.00	13 Q	2:09.72	4 Q	2:08.88	2nd place, silver medalist(s)
Christian Sprenger	100 m breaststroke	1:00.36	10 Q	1:00.76	14	Did not advance	
Christian Sprenger	200 m breaststroke	2:12.56	26	Did not advance			
Nicholas Sprenger	200 m freestyle	1:47.64	12 Q	1:47.80	12	Did not advance	
Craig Stevens	400 m freestyle	3:50.22	25	—N/a		Did not advance	
Craig Stevens	1500 m freestyle	15:04.82	15	—N/a		Did not advance	
Hayden Stoeckel	100 m backstroke	53.93	7 Q	52.97	1 Q	53.18	3rd place, bronze medalist(s)
Hayden Stoeckel	200 m backstroke	1:57.15	6 Q	1:56.73	7 Q	1:56.39	6
Eamon Sullivan	50 m freestyle	21.79	7 Q	21.75	6 Q	21.65	6
Eamon Sullivan	100 m freestyle	47.80	1 Q	47.05 WR	1 Q	47.32	2nd place, silver medalist(s)
Matt Targett	100 m freestyle	48.40	11 Q	47.88	4 Q	48.20	7
Leith Brodie*; Ashley Callus; Andrew Lauterstein; Patrick Murphy*; Eamon Sullivan; Matt Targett	4 × 100 m freestyle relay	3:12.41	3 Q	—N/a		3:09.91	3rd place, bronze medalist(s)
Grant Brits; Leith Brodie*; Nick Ffrost; Grant Hackett; Patrick Murphy; Kirk Palmer*	4 × 200 m freestyle relay	7:08.41	6 Q	—N/a		7:04.98	3rd place, bronze medalist(s)
Ashley Delaney*; Andrew Lauterstein; Adam Pine*; Brenton Rickard; Christian Sprenger*; Hayden Stoeckel; Eamon Sullivan; Matt Targett*	4 × 100 m medley relay	3:32.76	2 Q	—N/a		3:30.04	2nd place, silver medalist(s)

* Competed in the heats only

Women

Athlete	Event	Heat		Semifinal		Final	
Athlete	Event	Time	Rank	Time	Rank	Time	Rank
Bronte Barratt	200 m freestyle	1:57.75	10 Q	1:57.55	5 Q	1:57.83	7
Bronte Barratt	400 m freestyle	4:04.16	5 Q	—N/a		4:05.05	7
Cate Campbell	50 m freestyle	24.20	1 Q	24.42	2 Q	24.17	3rd place, bronze medalist(s)
Cate Campbell	100 m freestyle	54.55	13 Q	54.54	10	Did not advance	
Alicia Coutts	200 m individual medley	2:11.55	1 Q	2:12.03	5 Q	2:11.43	5
Sophie Edington	100 m backstroke	1:00.65	14 Q	1:01.05	13	Did not advance	
Sally Foster	200 m breaststroke	2:25.54	10 Q	2:26.33	9	Did not advance	
Melissa Gorman	800 m freestyle	8:32.34	17	—N/a		Did not advance	
Melissa Gorman	10 km open water	—N/a				2:00:33.6	15
Samantha Hamill	200 m butterfly	2:08.83	13 Q	2:09.58	12	Did not advance	
Samantha Hamill	400 m individual medley	4:41.89	22	—N/a		Did not advance	
Belinda Hocking	200 m backstroke	2:09.54	11 Q	2:08.80	6 Q	2:10.12	8
Leisel Jones	100 m breaststroke	1:05.64	1 Q	1:05.80	1 Q	1:05.17	1st place, gold medalist(s)
Leisel Jones	200 m breaststroke	2:23.81	2 Q	2:23.04	2 Q	2:22.05	2nd place, silver medalist(s)
Linda Mackenzie	200 m freestyle	1:57.96	12 Q	1:58.19	12	Did not advance	
Linda Mackenzie	400 m freestyle	4:05.91	10	—N/a		Did not advance	
Meagen Nay	200 m backstroke	2:08.79	3 Q	2:08.09	3 Q	2:08.84	7
Kylie Palmer	800 m freestyle	8:22.81	5 Q	—N/a		8:26.39	6
Stephanie Rice	200 m individual medley	2:12.07	6 Q	2:10.58	2 Q	2:08.45 WR	1st place, gold medalist(s)
Stephanie Rice	400 m individual medley	4:35.11	3 Q	—N/a		4:29.45 WR	1st place, gold medalist(s)
Emily Seebohm	100 m backstroke	1:00.27	9 Q	1:00.31	9	Did not advance	
Jessicah Schipper	100 m butterfly	57.58	1 Q	57.43	3 Q	57.25	3rd place, bronze medalist(s)
Jessicah Schipper	200 m butterfly	2:08.11	11 Q	2:06.34	2 Q	2:06.26	3rd place, bronze medalist(s)
Libby Trickett	50 m freestyle	24.67	4 Q	24.47	5 Q	24.25	4
Libby Trickett	100 m freestyle	53.99	6 Q	54.10	8 Q	53.16	2nd place, silver medalist(s)
Libby Trickett	100 m butterfly	58.37	12 Q	57.05	1 Q	56.73	1st place, gold medalist(s)
Tarnee White	100 m breaststroke	1:07.83	7 Q	1:07.48	4 Q	1:07.63	6
Cate Campbell; Alice Mills; Shayne Reese*; Melanie Schlanger; Libby Trickett	4 × 100 m freestyle relay	3:37.81	6 Q	—N/a		3:35.05	3rd place, bronze medalist(s)
Angie Bainbridge*; Bronte Barratt; Lara Davenport*; Felicity Galvez*; Linda Mackenzie; Kylie Palmer; Stephanie Rice; Melanie Schlanger*	4 × 200 m freestyle relay	7:55.10	6 Q	—N/a		7:44.31 WR	1st place, gold medalist(s)
Felicity Galvez*; Leisel Jones; Shayne Reese*; Jessicah Schipper; Emily Seebohm; Libby Trickett; Tarnee White*	4 × 100 m medley relay	3:57.94	1 Q	—N/a		3.52.69 WR	1st place, gold medalist(s)

* Competed in the heats only

== Synchronised swimming ==
Australia has qualified both a duet and a group entry in synchronised swimming.

Athlete	Event	Technical routine		Free routine (preliminary)			Free routine (final)		
Athlete	Event	Points	Rank	Points	Total (technical + free)	Rank	Points	Total (technical + free)	Rank
Myriam Glez; Erika Leal-Ramirez	Duet	41.250	21	41.584	82.834	21	Did not advance		
Eloise Amberger; Coral Bentley; Sarah Bombell; Tamika Domrow; Myriam Glez; Erika Leal-Ramirez; Tarren Otte; Samantha Reid; Bethany Walsh	Team	40.417	7	—N/a			41.750	82.167	7

== Table tennis ==
Australia has qualified both men's and women's table tennis teams for Beijing. Each team includes three competitors. The men's team is Kyle Davis, William Henzell and David Zalcberg. The women's team is Lay Jian Fang, Miao Miao and Stephanie Sang Xu.

Men's singles

Athlete	Event	Preliminary round	Round 1	Round 2	Round 3	Round 4	Quarterfinals	Semifinals	Final / BM	
Athlete	Event	Opposition Result	Opposition Result	Opposition Result	Opposition Result	Opposition Result	Opposition Result	Opposition Result	Opposition Result	Rank
Kyle Davis	Singles	Saleh (EGY); L 1–4	Did not advance							
William Henzell	Singles	Khourta (ALG); W 4–1	Lundqvist (SWE); W 4–2	Yoon J-Y (KOR); L 3–4	Did not advance					
David Zalcberg	Singles	Doan (VIE); L 0–4	Did not advance							

Women's singles

Athlete	Event	Preliminary round	Round 1	Round 2	Round 3	Round 4	Quarterfinals	Semifinals	Final / BM	
Athlete	Event	Opposition Result	Opposition Result	Opposition Result	Opposition Result	Opposition Result	Opposition Result	Opposition Result	Opposition Result	Rank
Jian Fang Lay	Singles	Aggarwal (IND); W 4–1	Paovic (CRO); L 3–4	Did not advance						
Miao Miao	Singles	Offiong (NGR); W 4–0	Kotikhina (RUS); W 4–3	Dang Y-S (KOR); L 1–4	Did not advance					
Stephanie Sang Xu	Singles	Kaffo (NGR); W 4–1	Ganina (RUS); W WO	Wu X (DOM); L 0–4	Did not advance					

Team

Athlete	Event	Group round		Semifinals	Bronze playoff 1	Bronze playoff 2	Bronze medal	Final	
Athlete	Event	Opposition Result	Rank	Opposition Result	Opposition Result	Opposition Result	Opposition Result	Opposition Result	Rank
Kyle Davis; William Henzell; David Zalcberg	Men's team	Group A China; L 0 – 3 Austria; L 0 – 3 Greece; L 0 – 3	4	Did not advance					
Jian Fang Lay; Miao Miao; Stephanie Sang Xu	Women's team	Group D South Korea; L 0 – 3 Japan; L 0 – 3 Spain; L 0 – 3	4	Did not advance					

== Taekwondo ==
Four Australians have qualified for the Beijing Olympics. Ryan Carneli will compete in the men's under 58 kg division and Burak Hasan in the men's 58–68 kg division. Carmen Marton will compete in the women's over 67 kg division and Tina Morgan in the women's 57–67 kg division.

Athlete	Event	Round of 16	Quarterfinals	Semifinals	Repechage	Bronze Medal	Final	
Athlete	Event	Opposition Result	Opposition Result	Opposition Result	Opposition Result	Opposition Result	Opposition Result	Rank
Ryan Carneli	Men's −58 kg	Go (PHI); W 1–0	Khawlaor (THA); L 0–2	Did not advance				
Burak Hasan	Men's −68 kg	López (PER); L 1–3	Did not advance					
Tina Morgan	Women's −67 kg	Sergerie (CAN); L 0–0 SUP	Did not advance		Sánchez (ARG); W 9–2	Épangue (FRA); L 1–4	Did not advance	5
Carmen Marton	Women's +67 kg	Benítes (ECU); W 2–0	Falavigna (BRA); L 2–5	Did not advance				

== Tennis ==
Australia has qualified two men and three women for the singles competition in Beijing while two doubles pairs have qualified in each of the men's and women's draws. The team is:

Men

Athlete	Event	Round of 64	Round of 32	Round of 16	Quarterfinals	Semifinals	Final / BM	
Athlete	Event	Opposition Score	Opposition Score	Opposition Score	Opposition Score	Opposition Score	Opposition Score	Rank
Chris Guccione	Singles	Blake (USA); L 3–6, 6–7^{(3–7)}	Did not advance					
Lleyton Hewitt	Singles	Björkman (SWE); W 7–5, 7–6^{(7–2)}	Nadal (ESP); L 1–6, 2–6	Did not advance				
Chris Guccione; Lleyton Hewitt	Doubles	—N/a	Calleri / Mónaco (ARG); W 4–6, 7–6^{(7–4)}, 18–16	Nadal / Robredo (ESP); W 6–2, 7–6^{(7–5)}	B Bryan / M Bryan (USA); L 4–6, 3–6	Did not advance		
Paul Hanley; Jordan Kerr	Doubles	—N/a	Aspelin / Johansson (SWE); L 6–7^{(7–9)}, 3–6	Did not advance				

Women

Athlete	Event	Round of 64	Round of 32	Round of 16	Quarterfinals	Semifinals	Final / BM	
Athlete	Event	Opposition Score	Opposition Score	Opposition Score	Opposition Score	Opposition Score	Opposition Score	Rank
Casey Dellacqua	Singles	Dulko (ARG); W 6–3, 6–4	Azarenka (BLR); L 2–6, 2–6	Did not advance				
Alicia Molik	Singles	Martínez Sánchez (ESP); L 1–6, 1–6	Did not advance					
Samantha Stosur	Singles	Errani (ITA); W 6–3, 6–2	S Williams (USA); L 2–6, 0–6	Did not advance				
Casey Dellacqua; Alicia Molik	Doubles	—N/a	Pennetta / Schiavone (ITA); L 4–6, 4–6	Did not advance				
Samantha Stosur; Rennae Stubbs	Doubles	—N/a	Kvitová / Šafářová (CZE); W 6–1, 6–0	Medina Garrigues / Ruano Pascual (ESP); L 6–4, 4–6, 4–6	Did not advance			

== Triathlon ==
Five Australians were selected to compete in the triathlon at the 2008 Olympics. Courtney Atkinson and Brad Kahlefeldt will contest the men's competition while Erin Densham, Emma Moffatt and Emma Snowsill will battle it out for the women's title.

Athlete	Event	Swim (1.5 km)	Trans 1	Bike (40 km)	Trans 2	Run (10 km)	Total Time	Rank
Courtney Atkinson	Men's	18:06	0:27	59:08	0:29	32:00	1:50:10.02	11
Brad Kahlefeldt	Men's	18:17	0:29	58:56	0:28	32:26	1:50:36.00	16
Erin Densham	Women's	20:54	0:30	1:05:27	0:31	35:46	2:03:08.76	22
Emma Moffatt	Women's	19:55	0:31	1:04:12	0:31	34:46	1:59:55.84	3rd place, bronze medalist(s)
Emma Snowsill	Women's	19:51	0:28	1:04:20	0:31	33:17	1:58:27.66	1st place, gold medalist(s)

== Volleyball ==
=== Beach ===
Two teams qualified for the Olympics: the women's team Barnett-Cook (Tamsin Barnett and Natalie Cook), and the men's team Schacht-Slack (Andrew Schacht and Joshua Slack).

Athlete	Event	Preliminary round	Standing	Round of 16	Quarterfinals	Semifinals	Final / BM	
Athlete	Event	Opposition Score	Standing	Opposition Score	Opposition Score	Opposition Score	Opposition Score	Rank
Andrew Schacht; Joshua Slack	Men's	Pool C Geor – Gia (GEO); W 2 – 0 (21–17, 21–19); Fernandes – Morais (ANG); W 2 – 0 (21–15, 21–9); Ricardo – Emanuel (BRA); L 0 – 2 (14–21, 17–21)	2 Q	Nummerdor – Schuil (NED); L 0 – 2 (16–21, 14–21)	Did not advance			
Tamsin Barnett; Natalie Cook	Women's	Pool C Shiryaeva – Uryadova (RUS); W 2 – 1 (21–8, 19–21, 15–12); Saka – Rtvelo (GEO); W 2 – 0 (21–18, 21–12); Larissa – Ana Paula (BRA); W 2 – 0 (23–21, 23–21)	1 Q	Koutroumanidou – Tsiartsiani (GRE); W 2 – 1 (22–20, 19–21, 15–12)	Talita – Renata (BRA); L 0 – 2 (22–24, 14–21)	Did not advance		

== Water polo ==
Australia participated in both the men's and the women's tournaments. The men's team finished in 8th place, while the women's team won the bronze medal. Australia's squads included three sets of siblings: Jamie and Gemma Beadsworth, the Santoromito sisters and the Rippon sisters. Kate Gynther is also a stepsister of the Rippons. (Bronwen and Emma Knox are unrelated.)

=== Men's tournament ===
Roster

The following is the Australian roster in the men's water polo tournament of the 2008 Summer Olympics.

№	Name	Pos.	Height	Weight	Date of birth	Club
1	James Stanton	GK	1.98 m (6 ft 6 in)	93 kg (205 lb)	21 July 1983	(Spain) CN Novarra Barcelona
2	Richie Campbell	CB	1.93 m (6 ft 4 in)	92 kg (203 lb)	18 September 1987	(Spain) CN Barcelona
3	Trent Franklin	D	1.84 m (6 ft 0 in)	83 kg (183 lb)	12 February 1979	(Australia) Sydney ONI
4	Pietro Figlioli	D	1.90 m (6 ft 3 in)	94 kg (207 lb)	29 May 1984	(Italy) Chiavari Nouk
5	Robert Maitland	CB	1.90 m (6 ft 3 in)	95 kg (209 lb)	4 September 1983	(Spain) CN Mediferrow Barcelona
6	Anthony Martin	D	1.92 m (6 ft 4 in)	94 kg (207 lb)	22 March 1985	(Australia) KFC Breakers Brisbane
7	Tim Neesham	D	1.84 m (6 ft 0 in)	86 kg (190 lb)	20 October 1979	(Australia) Fremantle Perth
8	Sam McGregor	CB	1.92 m (6 ft 4 in)	95 kg (209 lb)	12 August 1984	(Spain) CN Alcorcon Madrid
9	Thomas Whalan	D	1.94 m (6 ft 4 in)	89 kg (196 lb)	13 October 1980	(Italy) Savona
10	Gavin Woods	CF	1.99 m (6 ft 6 in)	95 kg (209 lb)	1 March 1978	(Australia) Balmain Tigers Sydney
11	Rhys Howden	D	1.88 m (6 ft 2 in)	78 kg (172 lb)	2 April 1987	(Australia) Brisbane Barracudas
12	Jamie Beadsworth	CF	1.93 m (6 ft 4 in)	110 kg (240 lb)	11 June 1985	(Australia) Fremantle Perth
13	Rafael Sterk	GK	1.85 m (6 ft 1 in)	85 kg (187 lb)	27 January 1978	(Australia) KFC Breakers Brisbane

Head coach: John Fox

Group play

Team	Pld	W	D	L	GF	GA	GD	Pts	Qualification
Hungary	5	4	1	0	60	36	+24	9	Qualified for the semifinals
Spain	5	4	0	1	52	34	+18	8	Qualified for the quarterfinals
Montenegro	5	2	2	1	43	33	+10	6	Qualified for the quarterfinals
Australia	5	2	1	2	45	40	+5	5	Will play for places 7–10
Greece	5	1	0	4	39	56	−17	2	Will play for places 7–12
Canada	5	0	0	5	21	61	−40	0	Will play for places 7–12

All times are China Standard Time (UTC+8).

10 August 2008; 14:00	Report	Australia	12–8	Greece	Ying Tung Natatorium, Beijing; Referees: Bock (GER), Chaney (USA)
10 August 2008; 14:00	Report	Score by quarters: 5–5, 4–3, 2–0, 1–0			Ying Tung Natatorium, Beijing; Referees: Bock (GER), Chaney (USA)
10 August 2008; 14:00	Report	Figlioli 4, McGregor 3	Goals	Ntoskas 3	Ying Tung Natatorium, Beijing; Referees: Bock (GER), Chaney (USA)

12 August 2008; 10:50	Report	Spain	9–8	Australia	Ying Tung Natatorium, Beijing; Referees: Margeta (SLO), Caputi (ITA)
12 August 2008; 10:50	Report	Score by quarters: 4–0, 2–4, 2–2, 1–2			Ying Tung Natatorium, Beijing; Referees: Margeta (SLO), Caputi (ITA)
12 August 2008; 10:50	Report	X. García 3	Goals	Whalan 2, Woods 2	Ying Tung Natatorium, Beijing; Referees: Margeta (SLO), Caputi (ITA)

14 August 2008; 15:20	Report	Australia	8–5	Canada	Ying Tung Natatorium, Beijing; Referees: Bock (GER), Klopper (NED)
14 August 2008; 15:20	Report	Score by quarters: 2–3, 2–1, 3–1, 1–0			Ying Tung Natatorium, Beijing; Referees: Bock (GER), Klopper (NED)
14 August 2008; 15:20	Report	Figlioli 3, Franklin 2	Goals	Feltham 2	Ying Tung Natatorium, Beijing; Referees: Bock (GER), Klopper (NED)

16 August 2008; 15:20	Report	Australia	12–13	Hungary	Ying Tung Natatorium, Beijing; Referees: Klopper (NED), Rak (CRO)
16 August 2008; 15:20	Report	Score by quarters: 4–4, 1–5, 4–2, 3–2			Ying Tung Natatorium, Beijing; Referees: Klopper (NED), Rak (CRO)
16 August 2008; 15:20	Report	Figlioli 3, Whalan 2	Goals	Molnár 3, Kiss 2, Biros 2, Kis 2	Ying Tung Natatorium, Beijing; Referees: Klopper (NED), Rak (CRO)

18 August 2008; 12:10	Report	Montenegro	5–5	Australia	Ying Tung Natatorium, Beijing; Referees: Chaney (USA), Caputi (ITA)
18 August 2008; 12:10	Report	Score by quarters: 2–1, 1–2, 0–1, 2–1			Ying Tung Natatorium, Beijing; Referees: Chaney (USA), Caputi (ITA)
18 August 2008; 12:10	Report	Vukčević 1, M. Janović 1, Ivović 1, Zloković 1, Gojković 1	Goals	Campbell 1, Martin 1, McGregor 1, Woods 1, Beadsworth 1	Ying Tung Natatorium, Beijing; Referees: Chaney (USA), Caputi (ITA)

Classification round
Classification semi-final

22 August 2008; 10:50	Report	Australia	17–16 (OT)	Italy	Ying Tung Natatorium, Beijing; Referees: Moliner Molins (ESP), Chaney (USA)
22 August 2008; 10:50	Report	Score by quarters: 4–2, 1–5, 4–0, 1–3 OT: 0–1, 3–2, 4–3 (PS)			Ying Tung Natatorium, Beijing; Referees: Moliner Molins (ESP), Chaney (USA)
22 August 2008; 10:50	Report	McGregor 3, Franklin 2, Figlioli 2, Maitland 2, Martin 2, Whalan 2	Goals	Calcaterra 6, Gallo 2, Felugo 2, Angelini 2, Sottani 2	Ying Tung Natatorium, Beijing; Referees: Moliner Molins (ESP), Chaney (USA)

Classification 7th–8th

24 August 2008; 10:50	Report	Australia	8–9	Greece	Ying Tung Natatorium, Beijing; Referees: Simion (ROU), Pinker (RSA)
24 August 2008; 10:50	Report	Score by quarters: 2–3, 2–2, 3–1, 1–3			Ying Tung Natatorium, Beijing; Referees: Simion (ROU), Pinker (RSA)
24 August 2008; 10:50	Report	Figlioli 3, Campbell 2, Martin 2	Goals	Schizas 2, C. Afroudakis 2	Ying Tung Natatorium, Beijing; Referees: Simion (ROU), Pinker (RSA)

=== Women's tournament ===
Roster

The following is the Australian roster in the women's water polo tournament of the 2008 Summer Olympics.

№	Name	Pos.	Height	Weight	Date of birth	Club
1	Emma Knox	GK	1.73 m (5 ft 8 in)	70 kg (150 lb)	2 March 1978	(Australia) Fremantle Perth
2	Gemma Beadsworth	CF	1.80 m (5 ft 11 in)	83 kg (183 lb)	17 July 1987	(Australia) Fremantle Perth
3	Nikita Cuffe	CF	1.79 m (5 ft 10 in)	73 kg (161 lb)	26 September 1979	(Australia) Sydney Uni
4	Rebecca Rippon	D	1.67 m (5 ft 6 in)	72 kg (159 lb)	26 December 1978	(Australia) Balmain Tigers
5	Suzie Fraser	D	1.75 m (5 ft 9 in)	63 kg (139 lb)	27 August 1983	(Australia) KFC Breakers Brisbane
6	Bronwen Knox	CF	1.82 m (6 ft 0 in)	88 kg (194 lb)	16 April 1986	(Australia) KFC Breakers Brisbane
7	Taniele Gofers	CF	1.83 m (6 ft 0 in)	80 kg (180 lb)	12 June 1985	(Australia) Sydney Uni
8	Kate Gynther	D	1.75 m (5 ft 9 in)	73 kg (161 lb)	5 July 1982	(Australia) Brisbane Barras
9	Jenna Santoromito	D	1.69 m (5 ft 7 in)	65 kg (143 lb)	21 January 1987	(Australia) Cronulla Sharks
10	Mia Santoromito	CB	1.69 m (5 ft 7 in)	80 kg (180 lb)	29 March 1985	(Australia) Cronulla Sharks
11	Melissa Rippon	D	1.69 m (5 ft 7 in)	70 kg (150 lb)	20 January 1981	(Australia) Brisbane Barras
12	Amy Hetzel	D	1.78 m (5 ft 10 in)	65 kg (143 lb)	27 April 1983	(Australia) KFC Breakers Brisbane
13	Alicia McCormack	GK	1.67 m (5 ft 6 in)	76 kg (168 lb)	7 June 1983	(Australia) Cronulla Sharks

Head coach: Greg McFadden

Group play

Team	Pld	W	D	L	GF	GA	GD	Pts	Qualification
Hungary	3	2	1	0	28	20	+8	5	Qualified for semifinals
Australia	3	2	1	0	25	22	+3	5	Qualified for quarterfinals
Netherlands	3	1	0	2	27	27	0	2	Qualified for quarterfinals
Greece	3	0	0	3	16	27	−11	0	Will play for places 7th–8th

All times are China Standard Time (UTC+8).

11 August 2008; 15:40	Report	Greece	6–8	Australia	Ying Tung Natatorium, Beijing; Referees: Decio Jr Patelli (BRA), Boris Margeta (SLO)
11 August 2008; 15:40	Report	Score by quarters: 2–5, 2–2, 1–1, 1–0			Ying Tung Natatorium, Beijing; Referees: Decio Jr Patelli (BRA), Boris Margeta (SLO)
11 August 2008; 15:40	Report	Roumpesi 3, Liosi 2	Goals	Beadsworth 4, Gofers 2	Ying Tung Natatorium, Beijing; Referees: Decio Jr Patelli (BRA), Boris Margeta (SLO)

13 August 2008; 13:00	Report	Hungary	7–7	Australia	Ying Tung Natatorium, Beijing; Referees: Mario Brguljan (MNE), Ahmet Erhan Tulga (TUR)
13 August 2008; 13:00	Report	Score by quarters: 1–1, 1–1, 1–2, 4–3			Ying Tung Natatorium, Beijing; Referees: Mario Brguljan (MNE), Ahmet Erhan Tulga (TUR)
13 August 2008; 13:00	Report	Drávucz 3, Pelle 2, Valkai 2	Goals	R. Rippon 2, B. Knox 2, M. Rippon 2	Ying Tung Natatorium, Beijing; Referees: Mario Brguljan (MNE), Ahmet Erhan Tulga (TUR)

15 August 2008; 13:00	Report	Netherlands	9–10	Australia	Ying Tung Natatorium, Beijing; Referees: Massimiliano Caputi (ITA), Gaetan Turcotte (CAN)
15 August 2008; 13:00	Report	Score by quarters: 1–2, 2–2, 1–2, 5–4			Ying Tung Natatorium, Beijing; Referees: Massimiliano Caputi (ITA), Gaetan Turcotte (CAN)
15 August 2008; 13:00	Report	van den Ham 3, van Belkum 2, Sijbring 2	Goals	B. Knox 4, Beadsworth 2, Gynther 2	Ying Tung Natatorium, Beijing; Referees: Massimiliano Caputi (ITA), Gaetan Turcotte (CAN)

Semifinal

19 August 2008; 14:20	Report	United States	9–8	Australia	Ying Tung Natatorium, Beijing; Referees: Boris Margeta (SLO), Massimiliano Caputi (ITA)
19 August 2008; 14:20	Report	Score by quarters: 2–2, 2–2, 4–1, 1–3			Ying Tung Natatorium, Beijing; Referees: Boris Margeta (SLO), Massimiliano Caputi (ITA)
19 August 2008; 14:20	Report	Villa 3 Hayes 2 Golda, Steffens, Gregorka, Craig 1	Goals	Gynther 3 R. Rippon 2 Beadsworth, Knox, M. Rippon 1	Ying Tung Natatorium, Beijing; Referees: Boris Margeta (SLO), Massimiliano Caputi (ITA)

Bronze medal game

21 August 2008; 17:00	Report	(bronze) Australia	12–11 (OT, PSO)	Hungary	Ying Tung Natatorium, Beijing; Referees: Sergey Antsiferov (RUS), Mladen Rak (CRO)
21 August 2008; 17:00	Report	Score by quarters: 2–2, 1–3, 3–1, 1–1 OT: 2–1, 0–1 PSO: 3–2			Ying Tung Natatorium, Beijing; Referees: Sergey Antsiferov (RUS), Mladen Rak (CRO)
21 August 2008; 17:00	Report	Knox, Gynther 3 Fraser 2 Beadsworth, R. Rippon, Santoromito, M. Rippon 1	Goals	Kisteleki 4 Valkai 3 Drávucz 2 Zantleitner, Pelle 1	Ying Tung Natatorium, Beijing; Referees: Sergey Antsiferov (RUS), Mladen Rak (CRO)

== Weightlifting ==
Two Australians will compete in the weightlifting at Beijing. Damon Kelly will lift in the men's over 105 kg class and Deborah Lovely in women's over 75 kg class.

Athlete	Event	Snatch		Clean & Jerk		Total	Rank
Athlete	Event	Result	Rank	Result	Rank	Total	Rank
Damon Kelly	Men's +105 kg	165	11	221	9	386	9
Deborah Lovely	Women's +75 kg	113	8	135	8	248	8

== Wrestling ==
Four wrestlers represented Australia at the 2008 Games:. None of them made it past the qualification round.

Key:

- VT - Victory by Fall.
- PP - Decision by Points - the loser with technical points.
- PO - Decision by Points - the loser without technical points.

Men's freestyle

Athlete	Event	Qualification	Round of 16	Quarterfinal	Semifinal	Repechage 1	Repechage 2	Final / BM	
Athlete	Event	Opposition Result	Opposition Result	Opposition Result	Opposition Result	Opposition Result	Opposition Result	Opposition Result	Rank
Ali Abdo	−74 kg	Gülhan (TUR); L 0–3 ^{PO}	Did not advance						21
Sandeep Kumar	−84 kg	Bye	Abdusalomov (TJK); L 0–3 ^{PO}	Did not advance		Bye	Danko (UKR); L 0–3 ^{PO}	Did not advance	20

Men's Greco-Roman

Athlete	Event	Qualification	Round of 16	Quarterfinal	Semifinal	Repechage 1	Repechage 2	Final / BM	
Athlete	Event	Opposition Result	Opposition Result	Opposition Result	Opposition Result	Opposition Result	Opposition Result	Opposition Result	Rank
Hassan Shahsavan	−74 kg	Bye	Melyoshin (KAZ); L 1–3 ^{PP}	Did not advance					18

Women's freestyle

Athlete	Event	Qualification	Round of 16	Quarterfinal	Semifinal	Repechage 1	Repechage 2	Final / BM	
Athlete	Event	Opposition Result	Opposition Result	Opposition Result	Opposition Result	Opposition Result	Opposition Result	Opposition Result	Rank
Kyla Bremner	−48 kg	Bye	Kim H-J (KOR); L 0–3 ^{PO}	Did not advance					17

== Media coverage ==
In Australia, both the Seven Network and SBS TV provided television coverage of the games. Live web video streaming of selected events was provided by Yahoo!7. Radio station 2GB held the exclusive Sydney radio rights through the Seven Network, while in other capital cities commercial partners were joined by ABC Local Radio in providing radio coverage. Additionally, Telstra broadcast Seven's coverage and that of selected events to 3G mobile phones via the Next G network.

An estimated eight million viewers in Australia watched the televised broadcast of the Opening Ceremony, the largest number ever, surpassing that of the 2000 Sydney Olympics opening ceremony. Seven was the only network to televise the Opening Ceremony in Australia.

Seven has been criticised for broadcasting Australian Football League games in lieu of Olympic events with Australian athletes in contention for medals, as well as for the quality of their coverage in general. The network cited existing contractual obligations for their AFL scheduling. In response, the AFL made concessions to Seven that allowed more Olympics coverage to be broadcast in certain markets.

During the closing days of the games, Seven and the rival Nine Network engaged in a "bidding war" to secure athletes, particularly gold medalists, for exclusive contracts to appear on their respective programs. Stephanie Rice signed a $800,000 two-year contract with Seven, and as a result withdrew (along with several other athletes) from being filmed for Nine's 60 Minutes hours before the show. Both networks are fighting for the lead in the Australian television ratings and, whilst Seven has broadcast the last several Olympics, Nine will be co-broadcasting with Foxtel the 2012 Summer Olympics in London.

The International Olympic Committee later awarded Seven its Golden Rings Award for "Best Olympic Programme". The award is given for the best overall Olympic coverage.

== See also ==
- Australia at the 2006 Commonwealth Games
- Australia at the 2008 Summer Paralympics
- Australia at the 2010 Commonwealth Games
