= Beadsworth =

Beadsworth is an English surname. Notable people with this name include:

- Andy Beadsworth (born 1967), sailor from Great Britain
- Arthur Beadsworth (1876–1917), English football forward
- Gemma Beadsworth (born 1987), Australian water polo centre forward
- Jamie Beadsworth (born 1985), Australian water polo player
