= Wapshott =

Wapshott is a surname. Notable people with the surname include:

- Kellie Wapshott (born 1981), Australian race walker
- Nicholas Wapshott (born 1952), British journalist, broadcaster, and writer
