= Hayley Beresford =

Australian equestrian

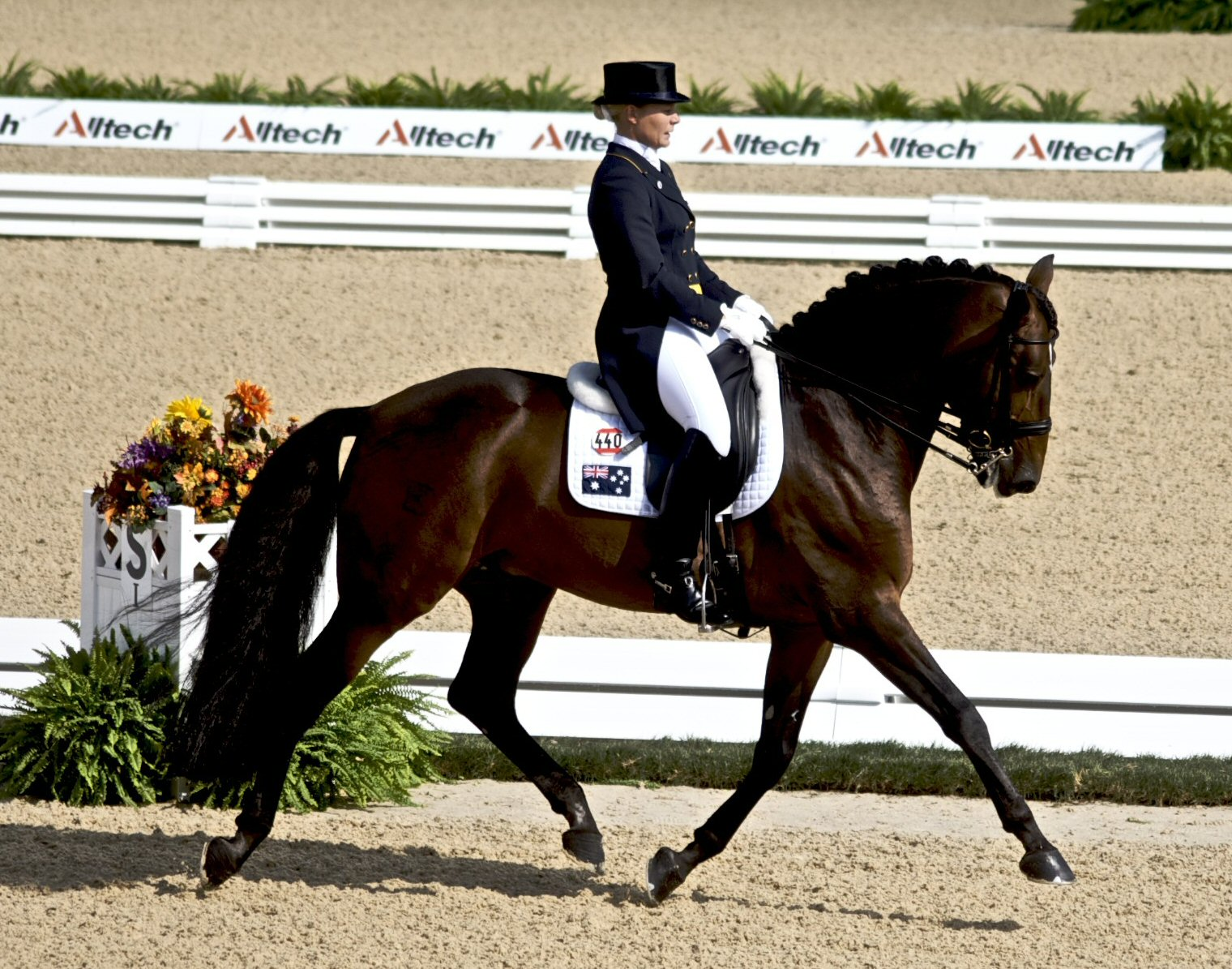
- Hayley Beresford & Relampago do Retiro competing at the 2010 World Equestrian Games

Personal information
- Born: 26 June 1978 (age 48) Kellerberrin, Western Australia, Australia

Sport
- Country: Australia
- Sport: Equestrian
- Event: Dressage

Hayley Beresford (born 26 June 1978 in Kellerberrin, Western Australia) is an Australian equestrian.

She competed at the Beijing 2008 Olympics in the individual and the team dressage events. Riding Relampago do Retiro, she finished in 19th place in the individual event, while the Australian team of Kristy Oatley, Heath Ryan and Beresford finished 7th in the team event.
