= Suzie Fraser =

Australian water polo player

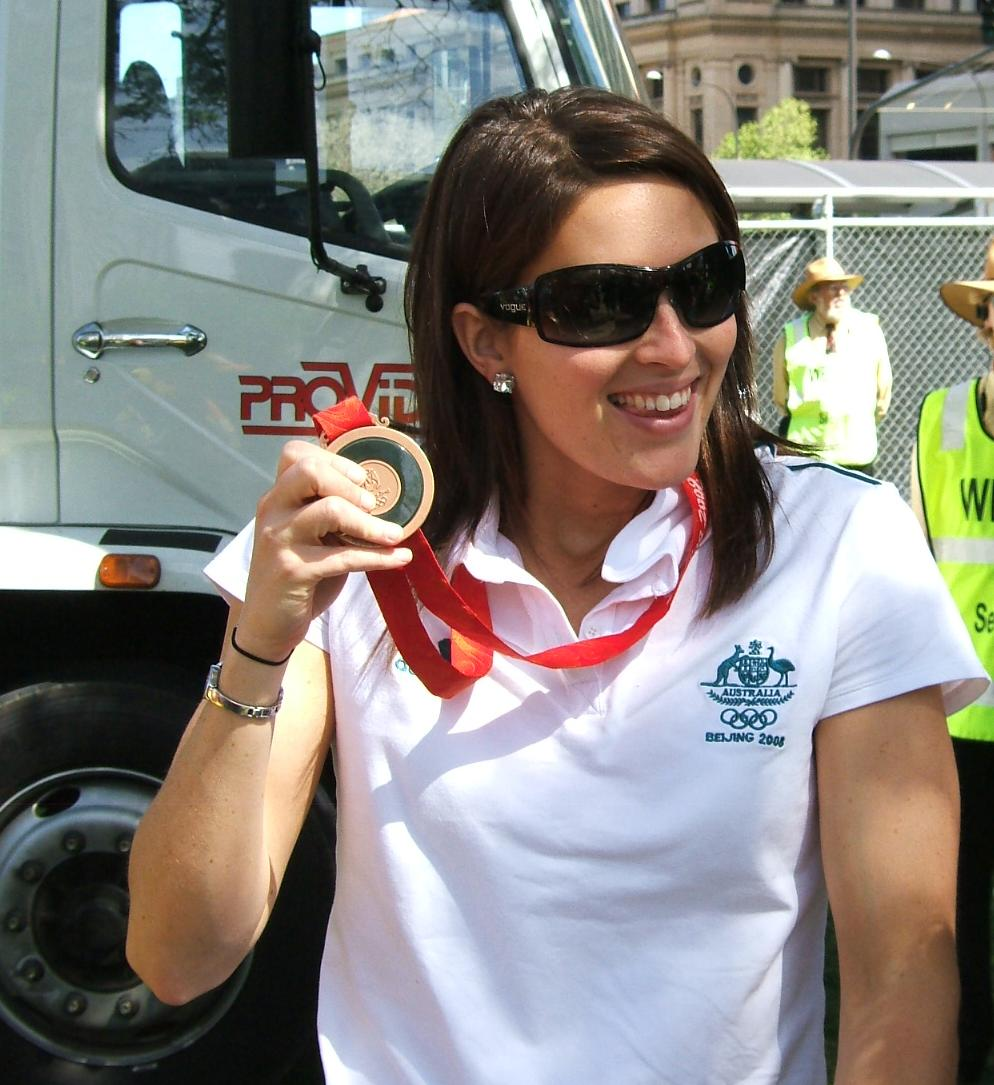

Personal information
- Born: 27 August 1983 (age 42) Brisbane, Australia

Sport
- Sport: Water polo
- Club: Queensland Thunder
Medal record
Representing Australia
Olympic Games
Bronze medal – third place	2008 Beijing	Team competition
World Championship
Silver medal – second place	2007 Melbourne	Team competition
FINA World Cup
Gold medal – first place	2006 Tianjin	Team competition

Suzannah "Suzie" Fraser (born 27 August 1983) is former Australian water polo player, who joined the women's national team in 2005. She was a member of the side that won the silver medal at the 2007 World Aquatics Championships in Melbourne, Australia, after having claimed the title at the 2006 FINA Women's Water Polo World Cup the previous year. Fraser had attended Brisbane Girls Grammar School and the University of Queensland, graduating with a combined Bachelor of Science/Law degree.

She represented Australia at the 2008 Summer Olympics in the bronze medal-winning team.

== See also ==
- List of Olympic medalists in water polo (women)
- List of World Aquatics Championships medalists in water polo
