= Angie Darby =

Australian modern pentathlete

Personal information
- Nationality: Australia
- Born: 2 May 1987 (age 39) Melbourne, Victoria, Australia
- Height: 1.76 m (5 ft 9 1/2 in)
- Weight: 63 kg (139 lb)

Sport
- Sport: Modern pentathlon
- Club: Victorian Amateur Modern; Pentathlon Association
- Coached by: Gerard Adams

Angie Darby (born 2 May 1987) is an Australian modern pentathlete. As of August 2011, Darby was ranked no. 141 in the world by the Union Internationale de Pentathlon Moderne (UIPM).

Darby qualified as a lone competitor for the women's modern pentathlon at the 2008 Summer Olympics in Beijing, after the Court of Arbitration for Sport threw out an appeal that questioned her Olympic eligibility. The Greek federation argued that Darby was ineligible because she failed to meet the full requirements of the five-event discipline, when she qualified for the games by winning the Asian & Oceanian Championships in Tokyo, Japan (four of the five disciplines were contested except for equestrian show jumping, because of an outbreak of equine influenza).

In the early rounds of the competition, Darby displayed a poor performance by finishing last out of thirty-six athletes in the air pistol shooting event (AP40), with a score of 184 points. Darby eventually placed thirty-first in one-touch épée fencing, but dropped to thirty-fifth position, when she stopped for up to 10 seconds halfway through the 200 m freestyle swimming race, halted by a pair of malfunctioned googles. Darby quickly moved to the top of the rankings, when she finished seventh in the show jumping segment, knocking off a total of 28 obstacle and time penalties. In the end, Darby finished the event with cross-country running in thirty-fifth place, for a total score of 4,816 points.
