= Jamie Beadsworth =

Australian water polo player

Personal information
- Born: 11 June 1985 (age 41) Perth, Western Australia, Australia

Sport
- Sport: Water polo

Jamie Beadsworth (born 11 June 1985) is an Australian water polo player who competed in the 2008 and 2012 Summer Olympics.

Beadsworth had a stroke on 1 April 2011 after being kicked in the neck accidentally at a National Water Polo League game. Beadsworth claimed to feel a little uneasy and assumed he was concussed so his partner Leah drove him straight from the game to hospital where neurosurgeons determined he had in fact suffered a stroke. With no preexisting conditions or family history of heart failure/issues, the stroke was dubbed a freak accident, Beadsworth stating, "I was more concerned that my health was 100 per cent rather than (about) my water polo future".

His sister is national water polo player, Gemma Beadsworth.
