= Gemma Beadsworth =

Australian water polo centre forward

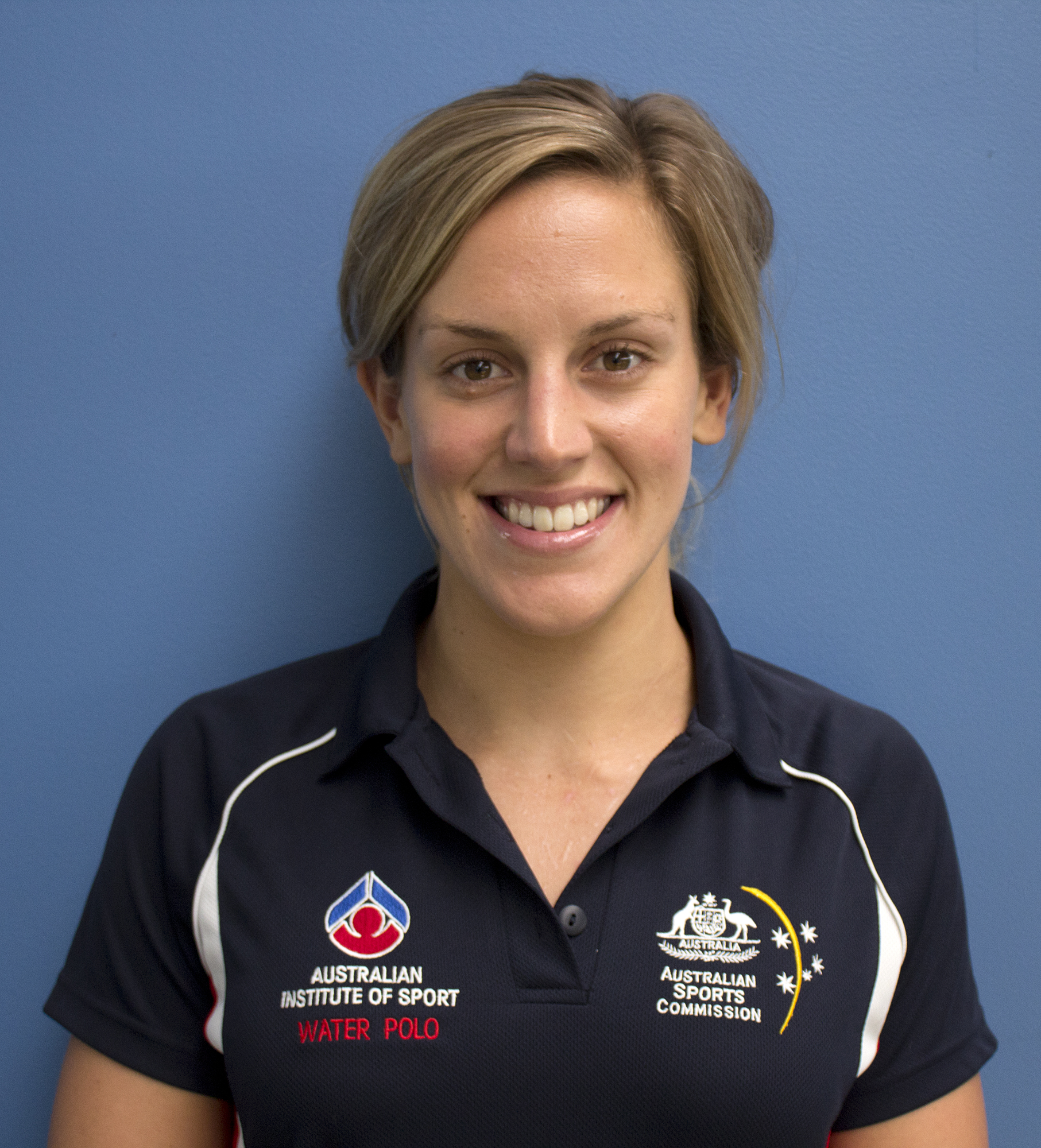
- Beadsworth in 2012

Personal information
- Full name: Gemma Jane Beadsworth
- Nationality: Australian
- Born: 17 July 1987 (age 38) Perth, Western Australia
- Height: 1.80 m (5 ft 11 in) (2012)
- Weight: 79 kg (2012)

Sport
- Sport: Water polo
- Event: Women's team
- Club: Fremantle Marlins
Medal record
Women's water polo
Representing Australia
Olympic Games
| Bronze medal – third place | 2008 Beijing | Team competition |
| Bronze medal – third place | 2012 London | Team competition |
World Aquatics Championship
| Silver medal – second place | 2007 Melbourne | Team competition |
FINA World Cup
| Gold medal – first place | 2006 Tianjin | Team competition |
| Silver medal – second place | 2010 Christchurch | Team competition |

Gemma Jane Beadsworth (born 17 July 1987) is an Australian water polo centre forward. She plays for the Fremantle Marlins in the National Water Polo League. She has represented Australia at three Olympic Games and won bronze medals at the 2008 and 2012 Summer Olympics. She has also won a silver medal at the 2007 World Championship, a gold medal at the 2006 World Cup and a silver medal at the 2010 World Cup.

== Personal life ==
Gemma Beadsworth was born on 17 July 1987 in Perth, Western Australia. She attended St Hilda's Anglican School for Girls, and helped officially open an Olympic size pool at the school in August 2011. She has a brother, Jamie Beadsworth, who also represented Australia in water polo at the 2008 Summer Olympics as centre forward.

== Water polo ==
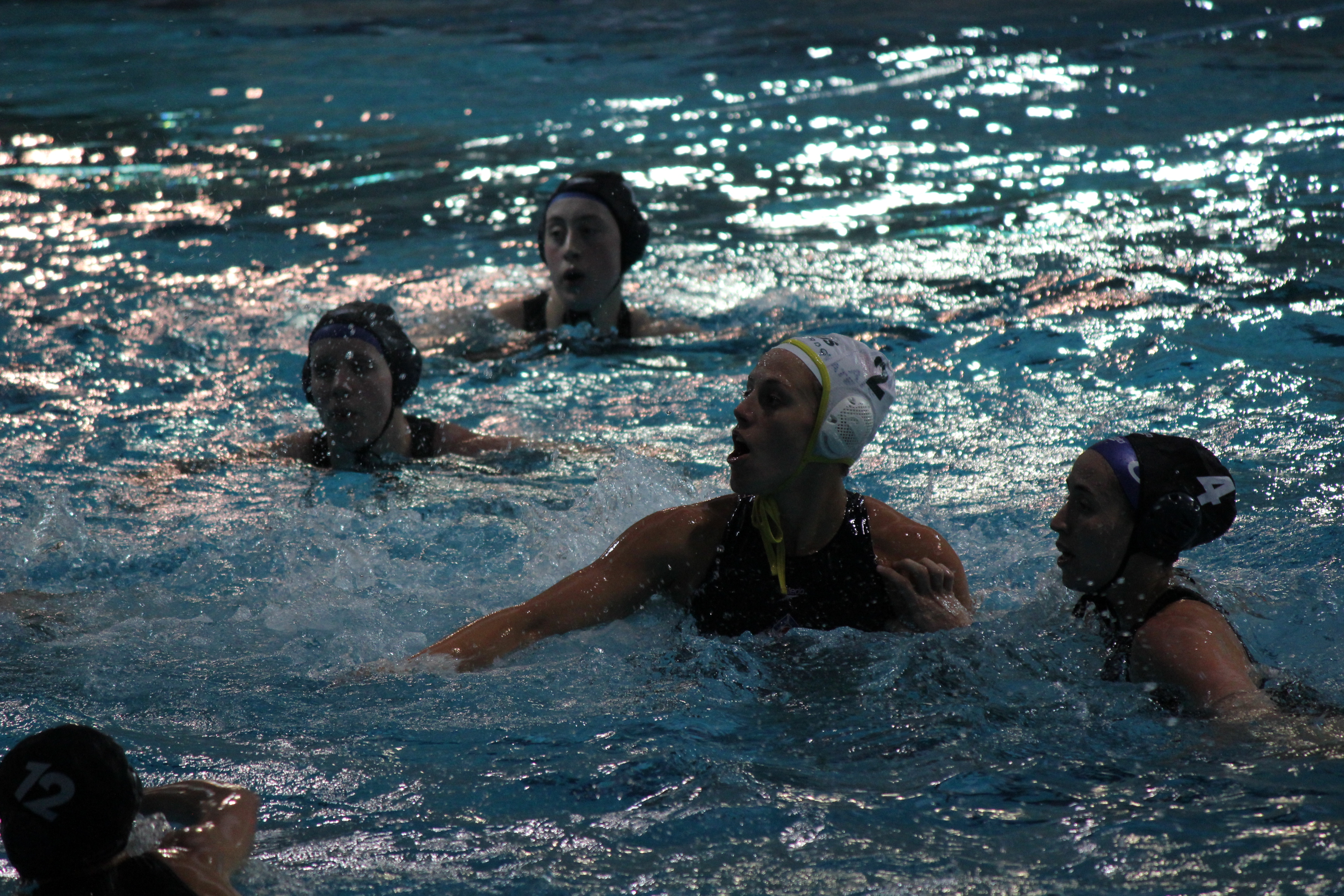
Gemma Beadsworth, in a white cap with number 2, during the fourth test match between Great Britain and Australia in Canberra in February 2012

Beadsworth plays water polo and is centre forward. As of 2012, she is a member of the Australia women's national water polo team, of which she was the team captain in 2011. She has had a water polo scholarship from the Western Australian Institute of Sport. She currently holds a water polo scholarship at the Australian Institute of Sport.

=== Club water polo ===
In 2007, 2008, 2010 and 2012, she played for the Fremantle Marlins in the National Water Polo League. During 2010, she was coached by Wendy Arancini, the mother of fellow senior national team member Zoe Arancini. In March 2012, she became the third woman in the National Water Polo League to play two hundred games in the league when her team played the Sydney University side.

=== Junior national team ===
Beadsworth has represented Australia on the junior national level. In 2004, she was a member of the team that toured Europe in July and August. In 2005, she was on the junior side that competed in the VI FINA World Junior Championships in Perth, in January. She was a member of the junior national side at the 2007 FINA U20 World Championships in Porto, Portugal, one of only two Western Australians on the team and the team captain. Australia won the Championship.

=== Olympics ===
As a 20-year-old, Beadsworth was one of four women from Western Australia who were members of the 2008 Summer Olympics squad. In the opening game of pool play, in which Australia beat Greece 8–6, she scored four goals. Her team ended up in the bronze medal match after losing 8–9 to the United States in the semi-finals and playing against Hungary for the bronze.

At the 2016 Rio de Janeiro Olympics, she made her third Olympic appearance. Although Australia did not reach the podium, the team finished sixth.

=== Other national team appearances ===
Beadsworth represented Australia at the 2005 World Championships held in Canada. She scored a goal in Australia 9–2 semi-final win over the Netherlands. She competed for Australia in the 2007 FINA World League Asia-Oceania qualifiers. In Australia's 16–8 defeat of New Zealand, she scored four goals. She was named to the team that competed in 2008 at the FINA world league preliminary round in Tianjin, China. In a 2008 Asia-Oceania qualifier against China for the World League Super Finals, she played in the 11–9 win that went to a penalty shoot out. In the match, she scored three goals for Australia. In 2008, prior to the Olympics, she competed in the World League Finals, and was named the player of the tournament for Australia. In February 2010, she attended a national team training camp in the Gold Coast in preparation for the team's appearance at the April Commonwealth Championships. In May 2010, she was a member of the team that competed at the FINA World League Asia-Oceania zone held in Osaka, Japan and Tianjin, China. She was a member of the Stingers squad that competed in the 2010 FINA World Cup, and competed in the Kirishi Cup in Russia in June 2011. In the first round, the team played the United States to a 7–7 draw. In that game, she scored two unanswered goals in the final ninety seconds of the match. In April 2011, she attended a training camp at the Australian Institute of Sport where the coach was "selecting a team for the major championships over winter." In July 2011, she was a member of the Australian Stingers that competed in the 2011 FINA World Championships in Shanghai. In preparation for this tournament, she attended a team training camp in Perth, Western Australia. She competed in the pool play match against Uzbekistan, which Australia won 27–2. In that match, she again scored four goals.

Beadsworth competed in the Pan Pacific Swimming Championships in January 2012 for the Australian Stingers. She played in the round robin match against the Australian Barbarians and was an important factor for the team during the second and third periods, helping the team to be 6–1 at the end of the third period. She played in the game where the Stingers beat Brazil 20–2, and scored three goals in the Stingers' 8–7 win over the United States. She was part of the Stingers squad that competed in a five-game test against Great Britain at the Australian Institute of Sport aquatic centre in Canberra in late February 2012. These were the team's first matches against Great Britain's national team in six years. In the first game of the test series on 21 February 2012 she scored one of the goals in Australia's 13–5 victory. The Australian team went on to win all five of the matches in the test.

== See also ==
- Australia women's Olympic water polo team records and statistics
- List of Olympic medalists in water polo (women)
- List of players who have appeared in multiple women's Olympic water polo tournaments
- List of women's Olympic water polo tournament top goalscorers
- List of World Aquatics Championships medalists in water polo
