= Heath Ryan =

Australian equestrian (born 1958)

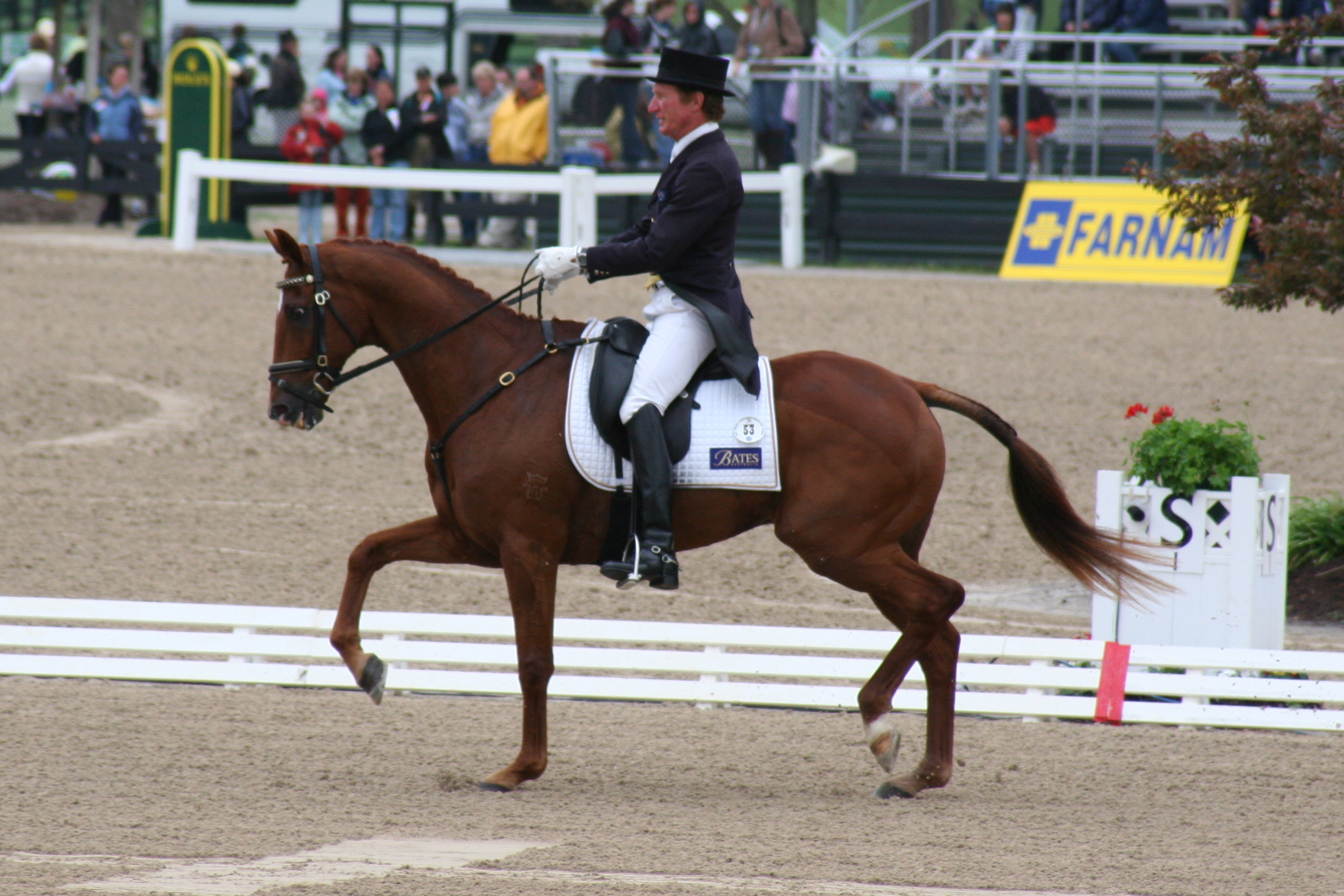
- Heath Ryan riding Flame (2007)

Personal information
- Nationality: Australian
- Born: 2 July 1958 (age 68) Sydney
- Height: 182 cm (6 ft 0 in)
- Weight: 74 kg (163 lb)

Sport
- Country: Australia
- Sport: Equestrian
- Events: Dressage and Eventing
- Club: Equestrian Federation of Australia
- Coached by: Harry Boldt (2002–2008); Wayne Roycroft (1990–2008)

Heath Ryan (born 2 July 1958) is an Australian equestrian who represented Australia at the 2008 Summer Olympics in Beijing as part of the dressage team.

Born in Sydney, Ryan was Australia's three-day event champion three times, and won every International Grand Prix competition in Australia in 2007.

After videos appeared to show Ryan repeatedly striking a horse, Ryan was provisionally suspended from all competitions and events by Equestrian Australia, the national governing body for equestrian sports in that country, in June 2025.

== Record ==
- 1990 Melbourne 3 day event: 1st
- 2002 World Equestrian Games: Team-12th
- 2005 Del Mar CDI3* Grand Prix: 5th
- 2008 Beijing Olympics: Team-8th
- 2008 Werribee CDI-W Grand Prix Kur: 1st
- 2008 Sydney CCI3*: 1st
- 2009 Sydney CDI-W Grand Prix: 2nd
- 2009 Sydney CCI3*: 3rd
- 2009 Del Mar CDI3* Grand Prix Kur: 2nd
