= Kellie Wapshott =

Australian racewalker

Personal information
- Nationality: Australia
- Born: 23 March 1981 (age 45) Melbourne, Victoria, Australia
- Height: 1.70 m (5 ft 7 in)
- Weight: 55 kg (121 lb)

Sport
- Sport: Athletics
- Event: Race walking
- Club: Knox Athletics Club
- Coached by: Brent Vallance

Achievements and titles
- Personal best: 20 km walk: 1:32:57 (2008)

Kellie Wapshott (born 23 March 1981 in Melbourne, Victoria) is an Australian race walker. She set her personal best time of 1:32:57, by finishing second in the women's 20 km at the 2008 Australian Race Walking Championships, coincidentally in her home city Melbourne.

Wapshott represented Australia at the 2008 Summer Olympics in Beijing, where she competed in the women's 20 km race walk, along with her teammates Jane Saville and Claire Woods. She successfully finished the race in fortieth place by fifty-six seconds behind Hungary's Edina Füsti, with a time of 1:37:59. Wapshott was elevated to a higher position, when Greek race walker and former Olympic champion Athanasía Tsoumeléka had been disqualified from the competition, after she was tested positive for CERA, an advanced version of the blood-booster erythropoietin (EPO).
