= 2001 Women's European Water Polo Championship squads =

This article shows all participating team squads at the 2001 Women's European Water Polo Championship.

== Hungary ==
No.	Name
1	Ildikó Sós
2	Zsuzsanna Tiba
3	Edit Sipos
4	Katalin Dancsa
5	Mercédesz Stieber
6	Kata Rédei
7	Rita Drávucz
8	Erzsébet Valkai
9	Krisztina Szremkó
10	Anikó Pelle
11	Ágnes Valkai
12	Ágnes Primász
13	Andrea Tóth
14	Brigitta Szép
15	Anett Györe

== Italy ==
No.	Name
1	Francesca Conti
2	Martina Micelli
3	Carmela Allucci
4	Manuella Janchi
5	Silvia Mosurgi
6	Gabriella Sciolti
7	Tania Di Mario
8	Cristina Lensoli
9	Giusy Malato
10	Alexandra Arauso
11	Maddazena Musumeli
12	Melania Greco
13	Linzia Ragusa
14	Simona Abbate
15	Paolia Sabbatini

== Russia ==
No.	Name
1	Marina Akobja
2	Galina Ritova
3	Valentina Voroncova
4	Szvetlana Kuzina
5	Veronika Linkova
6	Olga Kallkova
7	Maria Jajna
8	Jekatyerina Szolotko
9	Anna Klocskova
10	Irina Tolkunova
11	Jekatyerina Salimova
12	Anasztaszja Zupkova
13	Tatjana Petrova
14	Natalja Csepelina
15	Natalja Kutuzova

== Greece ==
No.	Name
1	Dimitra Asilian
2	Antiopi Melidoni
3	Paraskevi Kozomboli
4	Evangelia Moraitidou
5	Georgia Ellinaki
6	Maria Mastori
7	Angeliki Karapataki
8	Antonia Moraiti
9	Aikaterini Oikonomopoulou
10	Amalia Paterou
11	Sophia Petsali
12	Krystalia Diamantidi
13	Georgia Lara
14	Maria Kanellopoulou
15	Stravroula Antonakou

== Netherlands ==
No.	Name
1	Mascha Geurts
2	Marleen Ars
3	Gillian van den Berg
4	Danielle de Bruijn
5	Jorieke Oostendorp
6	Heleen Peerenboom
7	Marlies Wekdam
8	Tjarda Roodenhuis
9	Hanneke Kappen
10	Alette Sijbring
11	Mieke van der Sloot
12	Marieke van den Ham
13	Rianne Guichelaar
14	Wilma Verburg
15	Petra Pleunnis

== Spain ==
No.	Name
1	Cristina Ungo De Valesco
2	Mireia Ventura
3	Sara Dominguez
4	Mariona Ribera
5	Mercedes Valles
6	Belen Sanchez
7	Sol De Haro
8	Jennifer Pareia
9	Ana Ramirez
10	Elisabeth Fuentes
11	Blanca Yubero
12	Cristina Lopez
13	Mar Parera
14	Laura Vizcaino
15	Patricia Del Soto

== Germany ==
No.	Name
1	Simone Budde
2	Annette Cohrs
3	Nadja Dreskes
4	Stefanie Schindelbauer
5	Katrin Dideolf
6	Andrea Bohnenberger
7	Adriane Rump
8	Sabine Kottig
9	Nicole Lohmann
10	Monika Kruszova
11	Alekszandra Schilling
12	Christine Hoffmann
13	Daniela Ewert
14	Nadine Kunz
15	Carola Hartwig

== France ==
No.	Name
1	Caroline Ruyer
2	Anne Gäelle Miry
3	Gäelle De Rycke
4	Laure Gauthreau
5	Jenny Ritz
6	Virgine Mozglier
7	Agathe Fremaux
8	Celine Sonnes
9	Sandrine Lormeaux
10	Isabelle Fack
11	Alice Goulut
12	Myriam Argaut
13	Vanessa Hernandez
