= 2008 Women's European Water Polo Championship squads =

This article shows all participating team squads at the 2008 Women's European Water Polo Championship.

== France ==
No.	Name	Date of birth	Position
1	Celine Cherrier		
2	Vanessa Popieul		
3	Jenny Ritz		
4	Vanessa Hernandez		
5	Louise Guillet		
6	Lea Beauchiere		
7	Eugenie Pirat		
8	Kim Medjani		
9	Elise Lefert		
10	Marie-Charlotte Grand		
11	Clemence Clerc		
12	Gwendaelle Acosta		
13	Charlene Piquard		

== Germany ==
No.	Name	Date of birth	Position
1	Simone Budde	2 January 1979	
2	Lina Rohe	18 May 1984	
3	Linda Gerritsen	12 March 1983	
4	Ariane Rump	25 January 1981	
5	Katrin Dierolf	16 February 1979	
6	Claudia Blomenkamp	30 December 1986	
7	Monika Kruszona	4 August 1985	
8	Claudia Kern	28 January 1990	
9	Theresa Klein	10 August 1984	
10	Nina Wengst	20 March 1979	
11	Carmen Gelse	22 September 1987	
12	Mandy Zollner	17 April 1985	
13	Hanna Hanholz	17 November 1987	

== Greece ==
No.	Name	Date of birth	Position
1	Maria Tsouri	25 May 1986	goalkeeper
2	Triantafyllia Manolioudaki	19 March 1986	driver
3	Angeliki Gerolymou	22 June 1982	driver
4	Sofia Iosifidou	13 November 1981	centre back
5	Kyriaki Liosi	30 October 1979	driver
6	Stavroula Kozompoli	14 November 1974	centre forward
7	Aikaterini Oikonomopoulou	16 February 1978	centre back
8	Antigoni Roubesi	19 July 1983	driver
9	Evangelia Moraitidou	26 March 1975	centre back
10	Alkisti Avramidou	26 February 1988	driver
11	Stravroula Antonakou	2 May 1982	driver
12	Georgia Lara	31 May 1980	centre forward
13	Georgia Ellinaki	28 February 1974	goalkeeper

== Hungary ==
No.	Name	Date of birth	Position
1	Patricia Horvath	7 December 1977	
2	Krisztina Szremko	6 January 1972	
3	Barbara Bujka	5 September 1986	
4	Dora Kisteleki	11 May 1983	
5	Mercedesz Stieber	4 September 1974	
6	Orsolya Takacs	20 May 1985	
7	Rita Dravucz	14 April 1980	
8	Krisztina Zantleitner	8 May 1974	
9	Anett Gyore	10 December 1981	
10	Aniko Pelle	5 September 1986	
11	Agnes Valkai	27 February 1981	
12	Agnes Primasz	5 March 1980	
13	Ildiko Sos	27 December 1976	

== Italy ==
No.	Name	Date of birth	Position
1	Elena Gigli	9 July 1985	
2	Martina Miceli	22 October 1973	
3	Elisa Casanova	26 November 1973	
4	Silvia Bosurgi	17 April 1979	
5	Erzsebet Valkai		
6	Manuela Zanchi		
7	Tania Di Mario	5 April 1979	
8	Cinzia Ragusa	24 May 1977	
9	Francesca Pavan	24 April 1979	
10	Federica Rocco		
11	Maddalena Musumeci	26 March 1976	
12	Teresa Frassinetti	24 December 1985	
13	Chiara Brancati	20 July 1981	

== Netherlands ==
No.	Name	Date of birth	Position
1	Ilse Van Der Meijden	22 October 1988	
2	Yasemin Smit	21 November 1984	
3	Mieke Cabout	30 March 1986	
4	Biurakn Hakhverdian	4 October 1985	
5	Marieke Van Den Ham	21 January 1983	
6	Danielle De Bruijn	13 February 1978	
7	Iefke Van Belkum	22 July 1986	
8	Noeki Klein	28 April 1983	
9	Gillian Van Den Berg	8 September 1971	
10	Alette Sijbring	20 March 1982	
11	Rianne Guichelaar	16 August 1983	
12	Simone Koot	12 November 1980	
13	Meike De Nooy	2 May 1983	

== Russia ==
No.	Name	Date of birth	Position
1	Valentina Vorontsova	26 July 1982	
2	Natalia Shepelina	24 February 1981	
3	Ekaterina Prokofyeva	13 March 1991	
4	Sofya Konukh	9 March 1980	
5	Alena Vylegzhanina	14 August 1987	
6	Nadezda Glyzina	20 May 1988	
7	Ekaterina Pantyulina	6 October 1989	
8	Evgenia Soboleva	26 August 1988	
9	Oleksandra Karpovich	6 June 1986	
10	Olga Belyaeva	18 March 1985	
11	Elena Smurova	18 January 1974	
12	Olga Turova	13 March 1983	
13	Evgeniya Protsenko	25 November 1983	

== Spain ==
No.	Name	Date of birth	Position
1	Patricia Del Soto	16 December 1980	goalkeeper
2	Blanca Gil	19 September 1983	centre forward
3	Cristina Pardo Perarnau	17 June 1986	driver
4	Irene Hagen	8 January 1981	centre back
5	Miriam Lopez-Escribano	14 March 1985	driver
6	Jennifer Pareja	8 May 1984	driver
7	Christina Lopez	20 October 1982	driver
8	Anna Pardo	18 November 1983	centre back
9	Pilar Pena	4 April 1986	centre forward
10	Ona Meseguer	20 February 1988	driver
11	Maica García Godoy	17 October 1990	centre forward
12	Laura López	13 January 1988	driver
13	Laura Ester	22 January 1990	goalkeeper
