= Water polo at the 2013 World Aquatics Championships =

Water polo in the 2013 World Aquatics Championships was held between 21 July – 3 August at Piscines Bernat Picornell in Barcelona, Spain.

== Medal summary ==
=== Medal table ===
Rank	Nation	Gold	Silver	Bronze	Total
1	Hungary	1	0	1	2
2	Spain	1	0	0	1
3	Australia	0	1	0	1
3	Montenegro	0	1	0	1
5	Croatia	0	0	1	1
Totals (5 entries)		2	2	2	6

=== Men ===
Gold	Silver	Bronze
Hungary Viktor Nagy; Miklós Gór-Nagy; Norbert Madaras; Bence Bátori; Márton Vámos; Norbert Hosnyánszky; Ádám Decker; Márton Szivós; Dániel Varga (c); Dénes Varga; Krisztián Bedő; Balázs Hárai; Attila Decker Head coach: Tibor Benedek	Montenegro Zdravko Radić; Draško Brguljan; Vjekoslav Paskovic; Antonio Petrović; Darko Brguljan; Ugo Crousillat; Mlađan Janović; Nikola Janović (c); Aleksandar Ivović; Saša Mišić; Filip Klikovać; Predrag Jokić; Miloš Šćepanović Head coach: Vido Lompar	Croatia Josip Pavić (c); Luka Lončar; Ivan Milaković; Fran Paškvalin; Maro Joković; Luka Bukić; Petar Muslim; Andro Bušlje; Sandro Sukno; Nikša Dobud; Anđelo Šetka; Paulo Obradović; Marko Bijač Head coach: Ivica Tucak

=== Women ===
Gold	Silver	Bronze
Spain; Marta Bach; Andrea Blas; Anna Espar; Laura Ester; Maica García Godoy; Patricia Herrera; Laura López; Ona Meseguer; Lorena Miranda; Matilde Ortiz; Jennifer Pareja; María del Pilar Peña; Roser Tarragó	Australia; Lea Barta; Jayde Appel; Hannah Buckling; Holly Lincoln-Smith; Isobel Bishop; Bronwen Knox; Rowena Webster; Glencora Ralph; Zoe Arancini; Ashleigh Southern; Keesja Gofers; Nicola Zagame; Kelsey Wakefield	Hungary; Flóra Bolonyai; Orsolya Kasó; Dóra Antal; Barbara Bujka; Krisztina Garda; Anna Illés; Rita Keszthelyi; Dóra Kisteleki; Katalin Menczinger; Ibolya Kitti Miskolczi; Gabriella Szűcs; Orsolya Takács; Ildikó Tóth
