= 2026 Women's European Water Polo Championship squads =

This article shows all participating team squads at the 2026 Women's European Water Polo Championship held from 26 January to 5 February in Funchal, Portugal.

Age and club as of the first day of the tournament, 25 January 2026.

== Group A ==
=== Greece ===
Head coach: Theocharis Pavlidis

| Name | Date of birth | Pos. |
|---|---|---|
| Ioanna Stamatopoulou | 4 March 2001 (aged 24) | GK |
| Eleftheria Plevritou (C) | 23 April 1997 (aged 28) | CF |
| Foteini Tricha | 26 April 2005 (aged 20) | CF |
| Eleni Grigoropoulou | 21 May 1999 (aged 26) | W |
| Eleftheria Foundotou | 10 June 2002 (aged 23) | CF |
| Eleni Xenaki | 5 July 1997 (aged 28) | W |
| Eirini Ninou | 20 September 2002 (aged 23) | CF |
| Maria Patra | 17 October 1998 (aged 27) | DF |
| Christina Siouti | 1 September 2004 (aged 21) | DF |
| Vasiliki Plevritou | 8 June 1998 (aged 27) | CF |
| Sofia Tornarou | 23 July 2004 (aged 21) | DF |
| Maria Myriokefalitaki | 8 January 2001 (aged 25) | W |
| Evangelia Karytsa | 5 December 2002 (aged 23) | GK |
| Afroditi Bitsakou | 24 January 2011 (aged 15) | CF |
| Androniki Karagianni | 3 February 2009 (aged 16) | CF |

=== France ===
Head coach: Lorene Derenty

| Name | Date of birth | Pos. |
|---|---|---|
| Eszter Lefebvre | 3 January 2003 (aged 23) | GK |
| Lara Andres | 4 July 2006 (aged 19) | DF |
| Jade Boughrara | 14 October 2005 (aged 20) | W |
| Camelia Bouloukbachi | 9 September 2003 (aged 22) | DF |
| Arianna Banchi | 18 July 2006 (aged 19) | W |
| Kahena Benlekbir | 5 April 2002 (aged 23) | W |
| Lana Di-Fraja | 26 July 2006 (aged 19) | DF |
| Valentine Heurtaux (C) | 4 January 2005 (aged 21) | W |
| Ema Vernoux | 25 March 2004 (aged 21) | W |
| Elhyne Kilic-Pegourie | 13 March 2007 (aged 18) | CF |
| Tiziana Raspo | 3 October 2005 (aged 20) | DF |
| Emma Duflos | 23 July 2007 (aged 18) | W |
| Romane Secheresse | 24 June 2009 (aged 16) | GK |
| Leopoldine Burle | 20 September 2009 (aged 16) | W |
| Ona Pourtau Sire | 25 May 2009 (aged 16) | CF |

=== Slovakia ===
Head coach: (Italy) Cinzia Nunzia Ragusa

| Name | Date of birth | Pos. |
|---|---|---|
| Kristina Matouskova | 10 May 1998 (aged 27) | GK |
| Lenka Garancovska | 3 February 2003 (aged 22) | W |
| Anita Vitaliano | 12 June 2001 (aged 24) | DF |
| Barbora Baranovicova | 7 March 2000 (aged 25) | DF |
| Lea Drzikova | 14 August 2006 (aged 19) | W |
| Monika Sedlakova (C) | 6 December 2002 (aged 23) | DF |
| Karin Kackova | 2 June 2000 (aged 25) | W |
| Martina Kiernoszova | 25 November 2003 (aged 22) | W |
| Miroslava Stankovianska | 10 October 2000 (aged 25) | W |
| Dina Telypko | 13 June 1997 (aged 28) | DF |
| Sandra Holicova | 3 December 2007 (aged 18) | W |
| Eliška Turiaková | 15 June 2008 (aged 17) | W |
| Ella Pechova | 2 December 2007 (aged 18) | GK |
| Livia Vargová | 16 December 2009 (aged 16) | W |

=== Germany ===
Head coach: Karsten Seehafer

| Name | Date of birth | Pos. |
|---|---|---|
| Darja Heinbichner | 22 August 2004 (aged 21) | GK |
| Belen Muriel Vosseberg | 15 December 1997 (aged 28) | W |
| Emma Katharina Seehafer | 2 June 2003 (aged 22) | DF |
| Sinia Plotz | 3 May 2004 (aged 21) | DF |
| Ira Deike | 30 April 1998 (aged 27) | W |
| Gesa Deike (C) | 26 June 1995 (aged 30) | W |
| Anne Rieck | 1 March 2004 (aged 21) | DF |
| Aylin Fry | 1 December 1999 (aged 26) | W |
| Elena Katharina Ludwig | 2 February 2005 (aged 20) | W |
| Barbara Bujka | 5 September 1986 (aged 39) | CF |
| Jana Christina Stuewe | 23 June 2003 (aged 22) | CF |
| Georgia Sopiadou | 4 June 2005 (aged 20) | DF |
| Maria Sekulic | 9 August 2009 (aged 16) | GK |
| Emiliia Khmil | 19 November 2006 (aged 19) | W |
| Nele Moana Politze | 23 September 2008 (aged 17) | DF |

== Group B ==
=== Hungary ===
Head coach: Sándor Cseh

| Name | Date of birth | Pos. |
|---|---|---|
| Boglárka Neszmély | 27 August 2003 (aged 22) | GK |
| Dorottya Szilágyi | 10 November 1996 (aged 29) | W |
| Vanda Vályi | 13 August 1999 (aged 26) | W |
| Eszter Varró | 20 February 2006 (aged 19) | CF |
| Dalma Dömsödi | 26 January 2003 (aged 22) | CF |
| Nóra Sümegi | 2 July 2003 (aged 22) | W |
| Tekla Aubéli | 18 March 2004 (aged 21) | CF |
| Rita Keszthelyi (C) | 10 December 1991 (aged 34) | W |
| Dóra Leimeter | 8 May 1996 (aged 29) | W |
| Nataša Rybanská | 10 April 2000 (aged 25) | CF |
| Kamilla Faragó | 22 November 2000 (aged 25) | W |
| Krisztina Garda | 16 July 1994 (aged 31) | W |
| Szonja Golopencza | 29 November 2005 (aged 20) | GK |
| Panna Tiba | 22 May 2007 (aged 18) | W |
| Kata Hajdú | 27 March 2006 (aged 19) | W |

=== Romania ===
Head coach: Edward Andrei

| Name | Date of birth | Pos. |
|---|---|---|
| Mariia Dvorzhetska | 19 January 1998 (aged 28) | GK |
| Amalia-Cosmina Novăcean | 18 July 2007 (aged 18) | W |
| Krisztina-Emese Szeghalmi (C) | 10 August 1999 (aged 26) | W |
| Laboncz Nikolette | 12 October 1999 (aged 26) | CF |
| Sara-Maria Pascu | 16 September 2010 (aged 15) | W |
| Briana Mihăilă | 6 August 2001 (aged 24) | W |
| Alexia Maria Matei Guiman | 14 May 2004 (aged 21) | W |
| Sandu Andra-Ana-Maria | 18 March 2003 (aged 22) | CF |
| Andreea Bobeanu | 3 March 2005 (aged 20) | W |
| Ana-Maria Serbanescu | 4 December 2001 (aged 24) | W |
| Debora-Julia Nagy | 13 January 2005 (aged 21) | DF |
| Anastasiia Melnychuk | 3 November 1996 (aged 29) | W |
| Maria Lorena Oprisa | 18 July 2007 (aged 18) | GK |
| Alisia Cristiana Pleșca | 2 January 2008 (aged 18) | W |

=== Spain ===
Head coach: Jordi Valls Nart

| Name | Date of birth | Pos. |
|---|---|---|
| Mariona Terre | 12 October 2004 (aged 21) | GK |
| Ariadna Ruiz | 5 July 2002 (aged 23) | W |
| Queralt Bertrán | 10 November 2004 (aged 21) | W |
| Beatriz Ortiz (C) | 21 June 1995 (aged 30) | W |
| Nona Pérez | 10 April 2003 (aged 22) | W |
| Paula Crespí | 7 April 1998 (aged 27) | DF |
| Elena Ruiz | 29 October 2004 (aged 21) | W |
| Paula Prats | 6 September 2003 (aged 22) | W |
| Mireia Guiral | 30 March 2000 (aged 25) | DF |
| Paula Camús | 12 February 2002 (aged 23) | CF |
| Carlota Peñalver | 30 June 2006 (aged 19) | W |
| Paula Leitón | 27 April 2000 (aged 25) | CF |
| Martina Terré | 28 August 2002 (aged 23) | GK |
| Irene González | 23 July 1996 (aged 29) | W |
| Queralt Anton | 22 January 2008 (aged 18) | DF |

=== Portugal ===
Head coach: (Spain) Ferran Pascual

| Name | Date of birth | Pos. |
|---|---|---|
| Maria Sampaio | 14 May 2001 (aged 24) | GK |
| Alice Rodrigues | 23 June 2003 (aged 22) | CF |
| Carolina Fernandes | 4 April 2003 (aged 22) | W |
| Iara Santos | 24 September 2003 (aged 22) | W |
| Ines Nunes (C) | 14 August 1987 (aged 38) | CF |
| Jardim Beatriz | 6 May 2000 (aged 25) | DF |
| Carlota Milheiro | 14 January 2002 (aged 24) | DF |
| Madalena Lousa | 8 April 2003 (aged 22) | W |
| Maria Machado | 7 October 2004 (aged 21) | W |
| Beatriz Pereira | 8 February 2000 (aged 25) | W |
| Beatriz Carmo | 24 April 1999 (aged 26) | DF |
| Beatriz Sousa | 31 July 2006 (aged 19) | W |
| Mariana Carvalho | 16 October 2007 (aged 18) | GK |
| Joana Arromba | 7 November 2006 (aged 19) | W |
| Ana Reis | 20 February 2002 (aged 23) | CF |

== Group C ==
=== Italy ===
Head coach: Carlo Silipo

| Name | Date of birth | Pos. |
|---|---|---|
| Aurora Condorelli | 30 March 2001 (aged 24) | GK |
| Chiara Tabani | 27 August 1994 (aged 31) | CF |
| Morena Leone | 11 October 2004 (aged 21) | W |
| Emma Bacelle | 6 March 2007 (aged 18) | W |
| Veronica Gant | 14 April 2002 (aged 23) | CF |
| Lucrezia Cergol | 15 March 2001 (aged 24) | W |
| Sofia Giustini | 28 February 2003 (aged 22) | W |
| Roberta Bianconi (C) | 8 July 1989 (aged 36) | W |
| Claudia Roberta Marletta | 23 November 1995 (aged 30) | W |
| Chiara Ranalli | 6 May 1997 (aged 28) | W |
| Agnese Cocchiere | 4 June 1999 (aged 26) | CF |
| Dafne Bettini | 17 March 2003 (aged 22) | W |
| Helga Santapaola | 1 September 2004 (aged 21) | GK |
| Lavinia Papi | 11 February 2005 (aged 20) | CF |
| Carlotta Meggiato | 23 September 2000 (aged 25) | CF |

=== Croatia ===
Head coach: Mia Šimunić

| Name | Date of birth | Pos. |
|---|---|---|
| Natasha Trojan | 4 March 2001 (aged 24) | GK |
| Aurora Stipanov | 6 January 2006 (aged 20) | W |
| Roza Pešić | 24 October 2007 (aged 18) | W |
| Jelena Butić (C) | 28 May 2007 (aged 18) | W |
| Magdalena Butić | 18 February 2005 (aged 20) | CF |
| Ria Glas | 15 January 2006 (aged 20) | W |
| Nina Medić | 30 April 2005 (aged 20) | W |
| Tonka Rogulj | 27 May 2009 (aged 16) | W |
| Neli Janković | 12 August 2009 (aged 16) | W |
| Iva Rožić | 22 May 2005 (aged 20) | DF |
| Bruna Barišić | 26 March 1998 (aged 27) | W |
| Dora Kangler | 11 January 2005 (aged 21) | CF |
| Sara Frketić | 26 March 2007 (aged 18) | GK |
| Alka Lulić | 28 January 2007 (aged 18) | W |
| Nina Eterović | 3 August 2004 (aged 21) | W |

=== Serbia ===
Head coach: Miloš Bradić

| Name | Date of birth | Pos. |
|---|---|---|
| Nikolina Travar | 2 January 2001 (aged 25) | GK |
| Anja Švec | 22 March 2000 (aged 25) | CF |
| Milica Zelić | 23 July 2005 (aged 20) | CF |
| Ana Milićević | 13 September 2003 (aged 22) | W |
| Jelena Šarac | 21 July 2003 (aged 22) | W |
| Jovana Radonjić | 10 January 2007 (aged 19) | DF |
| Hristina Ilić | 30 January 2002 (aged 23) | W |
| Nada Mandić | 19 September 1997 (aged 28) | CF |
| Sesilija Diaz Mesa | 19 June 1996 (aged 29) | CF |
| Jelena Vuković (C) | 8 February 1994 (aged 31) | CF |
| Elena Ćuk | 11 August 2008 (aged 17) | CF |
| Tijana Lukić | 18 April 2005 (aged 20) | CF |
| Maja Lizy Dulić | 22 April 2004 (aged 21) | GK |
| Maša Ćuk | 20 January 2010 (aged 16) | DF |
| Nika Ratković | 3 July 2008 (aged 17) | W |

=== Turkey ===
Head Coach: (Italy) Piotr Marcoci

| Name | Date of birth | Pos. |
|---|---|---|
| Elif Dilara Aydınlık | 19 July 1999 (aged 26) | GK |
| Emma Celine Gurcan | 16 July 2002 (aged 23) | W |
| Dilara Buralı (C) | 27 March 2000 (aged 25) | CF |
| Elvira Yermakova | 22 March 2001 (aged 24) | W |
| Yelizaveta Ivanova | 25 December 2000 (aged 25) | W |
| Ecehan Gökçe Temel | 12 April 2000 (aged 25) | W |
| Hanzade Dabbağ | 22 January 2007 (aged 19) | W |
| Naz Ozdemir | 27 March 2008 (aged 17) | W |
| Duru Kaleağasi | 6 June 2005 (aged 20) | DF |
| Kübra Kuş | 9 November 1994 (aged 31) | W |
| Milana Molnar | 4 July 2003 (aged 22) | DF |
| Eda Moroglu | 8 May 2010 (aged 15) | DF |
| Darya Boykova | 30 May 2005 (aged 20) | GK |
| Defne Keremoglu | 24 August 2010 (aged 15) | |
| Hamiyet Süzmeçelik | 15 January 2006 (aged 20) | DF |

== Group D ==
=== Netherlands ===
The squad was announced on 10 January.

Head Coach: (Greece) Evangelos Doudesis

| Name | Date of birth | Pos. |
|---|---|---|
| Laura Aarts | 10 August 1996 (aged 29) | GK |
| Christina Hicks | 3 February 2002 (aged 23) | CF |
| Simone van de Kraats | 15 November 2000 (aged 25) | W |
| Maxine Schaap | 1 November 2000 (aged 25) | W |
| Maartje Keuning (C) | 26 April 1998 (aged 27) | W |
| Fleurien Bosveld | 19 February 1998 (aged 27) | W |
| Bente Rogge | 2 October 1997 (aged 28) | DF |
| Noa de Vries | 5 January 2004 (aged 22) | CF |
| Kitty-Lynn Joustra | 11 January 1998 (aged 28) | CF |
| Lieke Rogge | 30 November 2000 (aged 25) | W |
| Lola Moolhuijzen | 17 August 2004 (aged 21) | W |
| Nina ten Broek | 4 July 2001 (aged 24) | DF |
| Britt van den Dobbelsteen | 6 September 2002 (aged 23) | GK |
| Pien Gorter | 25 June 2006 (aged 19) | W |
| Linde Haksteen | 4 December 2006 (aged 19) | W |

=== Switzerland ===
Head coach: (Serbia) Vladimir Bajkovic

| Name | Date of birth | Pos. |
|---|---|---|
| Leah Friedman | 24 March 2001 (aged 24) | GK |
| Samira Schwab | 14 April 2006 (aged 19) | W |
| Lotti Verhagen | 13 April 2002 (aged 23) | W |
| Lena Oberli | 15 August 2003 (aged 22) | DF |
| Paola De Feo (C) | 13 January 1989 (aged 37) | W |
| Nina Mikulić | 5 July 2007 (aged 18) | CF |
| Jacqueline Kohli | 12 May 1990 (aged 35) | DF |
| Amy Nussbaumer | 25 July 2006 (aged 19) | W |
| Julia Mattoscio | 11 December 2000 (aged 25) | DF |
| Eliane De Bue | 27 August 2000 (aged 25) | W |
| Melanie Adler | 22 May 1993 (aged 32) | W |
| Alina Morgenegg | 29 August 1997 (aged 28) | CF |
| Meret Schmist | 1 August 2003 (aged 22) | GK |
| Lena Rohde | 26 January 2005 (aged 20) | DF |
| Anouk Soder | 6 January 2007 (aged 19) | DF |

=== Great Britain ===
Head Coach: (Greece) Theodoros Nousios

| Name | Date of birth | Pos. |
|---|---|---|
| Sophie Jackson | 21 March 2000 (aged 25) | GK |
| Isobel Howe | 11 February 1997 (aged 28) | W |
| Amelia Peters | 28 November 2001 (aged 24) | W |
| Cecily Turner | 14 May 2001 (aged 24) | W |
| Toula Falvey | 16 February 2000 (aged 25) | CF |
| Katie Brown | 18 May 1994 (aged 31) | W |
| Katy Cutler | 3 May 2001 (aged 24) | W |
| Brooke Tafazolli | 16 September 1995 (aged 30) | DF |
| Georgina Rogers (C) | 25 December 1998 (aged 27) | DF |
| Harriet Dickens | 20 September 2005 (aged 20) | W |
| Lucy Blenkinship | 26 March 2008 (aged 17) | CF |
| Amelie Cornell | 14 October 2005 (aged 20) | W |
| Cassidy Ball | 3 December 1998 (aged 27) | GK |
| Elizabeth Ross | 10 January 2007 (aged 19) | DF |

=== Israel ===
Head coach: (Greece) Orestis Anastasios Salahas

| Name | Date of birth | Pos. |
|---|---|---|
| Roni Kakuzin | 23 October 2006 (aged 19) | GK |
| Tahel Levi | 19 July 2004 (aged 21) | W |
| Carmel-Rivka Rahoum | 24 January 2006 (aged 20) | CF |
| Maria Mia Bogachenko | 29 July 2002 (aged 23) | W |
| Shiri Wissmann | 11 June 2008 (aged 17) | DF |
| Alma Yaacobi (C) | 3 August 2004 (aged 21) | CF |
| Shunit Strugo | 7 January 1987 (aged 39) | W |
| Noga Levinshtein | 12 April 2005 (aged 20) | W |
| Miya Tirosh | 15 January 2006 (aged 20) | DF |
| Noa Sasover | 8 March 2003 (aged 22) | CF |
| Noa Markovsky | 19 September 2004 (aged 21) | DF |
| Ronny Gazit | 31 December 2004 (aged 21) | W |
| Inbar Geva | 19 March 1998 (aged 27) | GK |
| Gili Borenstein | 31 July 2008 (aged 17) | W |
| Maya Rivka Katzir | 8 March 2006 (aged 19) | W |

=== Notable players ===
| Oldest player | Age |
|---|---|
| (Germany) Barbara Bujka | 5 September 1986 (aged 39) |
| Youngest player | Age |
| (Romania) Sara-Maria Pascu | 16 September 2010 (aged 15) |
