= 2022 Women's European Water Polo Championship squads =

This article shows all participating team squads at the 2022 Women's European Water Polo Championship.

== Group A ==
=== Croatia ===
The following is Croatia's roster at the 2022 Women's European Water Polo Championship.

Head coach: Aljoša Kunac

- Bruna Barišić W
- Kiara Brnetić DF
- Domina Butić W
- Ivana Butić D
- Jelena Butić W
- Magdalena Butić CB
- Ana Desnica DF
- Nina Eterović DF
- Dora Kangler CB
- Dina Lordan W
- Andrea Marić GK
- Emmi Miljković D
- Alexandra Ratković GK
- Iva Rožić D
- Matea Skelin DF

=== Germany ===
The following is Germana's roster at the 2022 Women's European Water Polo Championship.

Head coach: Sven Schulz

- Gesa Deike W
- Ira Deike W
- Aylin Fry W
- Felicitas Guse GK
- Darja Heinbichner GK
- Marijke Elisabeth Kijlstra DF
- Lynn Krukenberg CF
- Franka Lipinski
- Elena Ludwig
- Ioanna Petiki DF
- Sinia Plotz CB
- Anne Rieck DF
- Jana Stüwe
- Greta Isabella Tadday
- Belen Muriel Vosseberg W

=== Greece ===
The following is Greece's roster at the 2022 Women's European Water Polo Championship.

Head coach: Alexia Kammenou

- Ioanna Chydirioti
- Eleni Elliniadi
- Athina Dimitra Giannopoulou
- Maria Myriokefalitaki
- Eirini Ninou
- Maria Patra DF
- Eleftheria Plevritou W
- Margarita Plevritou DF
- Vasiliki Plevritou W
- Stefania Santa
- Christina Siouti CB
- Eleni Sotireli GK
- Ioanna Stamatopoulou GK
- Foteini Tricha W
- Eleni Xenaki CF

=== Hungary ===
The following is Hungary's roster at the 2022 Women's European Water Polo Championship.

Head coach: Attila Bíró

- Dalma Domsodi
- Kamilla Faragó W
- Tamara Farkas W
- Krisztina Garda AR
- Gréta Gurisatti W
- Brigitta Horváth
- Alexandra Kiss GK
- Dóra Leimeter W
- Alda Magyari GK
- Géraldine Mahieu
- Zsuzsanna Máté DF
- Rebecca Parkes CF
- Kinga Peresztegi-Nagy CB
- Dorottya Szilágyi W
- Vanda Vályi

=== Netherlands ===
The following is Netherlands's roster at the 2022 Women's European Water Polo Championship.

Head coach: Evangelos Doudesis

- Laura Aarts GK
- Fleurien Bosveld
- Kitty-Lynn Joustra CF
- Maartje Keuning W
- Ilse Koolhaas CB
- Lola Moolhuijzen
- Bente Rogge DF
- Vivian Sevenich W
- Brigitte Sleeking W
- Nina ten Broek
- Simone van de Kraats W
- Sabrina van der Sloot W
- Britt van den Dobbelsteen GK
- Rozanne Voorvelt CB
- Iris Wolves CF

=== Romania ===
The following is Romania's roster at the 2022 Women's European Water Polo Championship.

Head coach: Berttini Nenciu

- Xenia-Bianca Bonca DF
- Andra Bunea
- Demi Carpatorea
- Bianca Dumitru
- Mariia Dvorzhetska GK
- Chelsea Gandrabura DF
- Nikolette Laboncz
- Alexia Maria Matei Guiman
- Anastasiia Melnychuk
- Debora-Julia Nagy
- Alina-Ioana Olteanu
- Krisztina-Emese Szeghalmi
- Szabina Szilagyi
- Diana Togănel GK
- Anita-Johanna Toth

== Group B ==
=== France ===
The following is France's roster at the 2022 Women's European Water Polo Championship.

Head coach: Émilien Bugeaud

- Aurelie Battu
- Camelia Bouloukbachi DF
- Anne Collas GK
- Audrey Daule AR
- Juliette Dhalluin AR
- Lucie Fanara
- Gabrielle Fitaire DF
- Louise Guillet AR
- Valentine Heurtaux
- Viviane Kretzmann-Bahia AR
- Morgane Le Roux
- Estelle Millot AR
- Tiziana Raspo
- Ema Vernoux W
- Chloé Vidal GK

=== Israel ===
The following is Israel's roster at the 2022 Women's European Water Polo Championship.

Head coach: Dimitrios Mavrotas

- Lior Ben David W
- Maria Bogachenko W
- Yahav Farkash DF
- Hila Futorian DF
- Inbar Geva GK
- Nofar Hochberg AR
- Veronika Kordonskaia
- Tahel Levi W
- Moran Lindhout AR
- Dar Menakerman
- Kerem Noy CF
- Ayelet Peres GK
- Noa Sasover FP
- Shunit Strugo AR
- Alma Yaacobi CF

=== Italy ===
The following is Italy's roster at the 2022 Women's European Water Polo Championship.

Head coach: Carlo Silipo

- Silvia Avegno W
- Caterina Banchelli GK
- Dafne Bettini
- Roberta Bianconi W
- Lucrezia Lys Cergol
- Agnese Cocchiere
- Giuseppina Condorelli
- Luna Di Claudio
- Giuditta Galardi
- Sofia Giustini
- Claudia Marletta CF
- Valeria Palmieri CF
- Domitilla Picozzi
- Chiara Tabani DF
- Giulia Viacava

=== Serbia ===
The following is Serbia's roster at the 2022 Women's European Water Polo Championship.

Head coach: Dragana Ivković

- Lolita Avdić AR
- Hristina Ilić W
- Janja Kaplarević CF
- Vanja Lazić GK
- Iva Lujić AR
- Jana Lujić AR
- Nada Mandić AR
- Kristina Miladinović W
- Ana Milićević W
- Anja Mišković W
- Nadja Novaković W
- Milana Popov W
- Anja Švec AR
- Nikolina Travar GK
- Jelena Vuković AR

=== Slovakia ===
The following is Slovakia's roster at the 2022 Women's European Water Polo Championship.

Head coach: Szabolcs Eschwig-Hajts

- Tamara Dubná AR
- Emma Dvoranová GK
- Lenka Garančovská W
- Julia Janov D
- Karin Kačková W
- Martina Kiernoszová AR
- Beáta Kováčiková AR
- Janka Kurucová AR
- Nikita Petty D
- Monika Sedláková AR
- Bronislava Šepeľová FP
- Kristina Stehlíková GK

=== Spain ===
The following is Spain's roster at the 2022 Women's European Water Polo Championship.

Head coach: Miki Oca

- Paula Camus DF
- Anni Espar AR
- Laura Ester GK
- Judith Forca D
- Maica García Godoy CF
- Irene González W
- Paula Leitón CF
- Cristina Nogue Frigola DF
- Beatriz Ortiz D
- Pili Peña W
- Nona Perez Vivas W
- Paula Prats Rodriguez DF
- Elena Ruiz AR
- Martina Terre GK
