= 2026 Women's European Water Polo Championship final =

International water-polo match

- The Olympic Swimming Pool Complex hosted the final.
- Event: 2026 Women's European Water Polo Championship
Hungary	Netherlands
10	10
- Netherlands won 5–3 on penalties
- Date: 5 February 2026
- Venue: Olympic Swimming Pool Complex, Funchal
- Player of the Match: (Netherlands) Simone van de Kraats
- Referee: Aurely Bouchez (FRA); Hendrik Schopp (GER)

The 2026 Women's European Water Polo Championship final was the final match of the 2026 Women's European Water Polo Championship, the 21st edition of the biannual continental tournament in women's national water polo teams, organised by Europe's governing aquatics body, European Aquatics. The match was played at Olympic Swimming Pool Complex in Funchal, Madeira, Portugal, on 5 February 2026, and was contested by Hungary and defending champions Netherlands.

The tournament comprised hosts Portugal and 15 other teams. The 16 teams competed in a group stage, from which 8 teams qualified for the main round and 4 later advanced to the semifinals.

For Hungary, it is their eleventh final and it is also the twelfth final for the Dutch. This is the sixth time they have met each other in a European Championship final after 1985, 1987, 1989, 1991 and 2016, with Hungary winning three times and the other two being won by the Netherlands. Both sides had already met each other earlier in the tournament, with the Dutch winning 5–4. Their last appearances for Hungary and Netherlands in the final were in 2016 and 2024 respectively.

Netherlands defended their title with a 15–13 penalty shootout win over Hungary.

== Background ==
The 2026 Women's European Water Polo Championship is the 21st edition of the biannual continental tournament in women's national water polo teams, organised by Europe's governing aquatics body, European Aquatics. The tournament takes place from 26 January to 5 February 2026. This edition is the first one ever to have a 25 meter swimming pool, down from 30 meters.

The competition was held in Madeira's capital, Funchal, for the first time. This was the second edition to have different hosts for both genders after European Aquatics made the change permanent in March 2025. This edition will also witness a new format, introducing a second group stage.

== Route to the final ==
Note: In all results below, the score of the finalist is given first.

Hungary
Round
Netherlands
Opponent
Result
Preliminary round
Opponent
Result
Spain
9–7
Match 1
Great Britain
14–4
Romania
28–3
Match 2
Switzerland
28–2
Portugal
28–4
Match 3
Israel
23–6
Group B placement

Pos	Team	Pld	Pts
1	Hungary	3	9
2	Spain	3	6
3	Portugal (H)	3	3
4	Romania	3	0

Source: European Aquatics
(H) Host
Final standings
Group D placement

Pos	Team	Pld	Pts
1	Netherlands	3	9
2	Israel	3	6
3	Great Britain	3	3
4	Switzerland	3	0

Source: European Aquatics
Opponent
Result
Main round
Opponent
Result
Netherlands
4–5
Match 4
Hungary
5–4
Israel
22–6
Match 5
Spain
13–16 PSO
Group F placement

Pos	Team	Pld	Pts
1	Netherlands	3	7
2	Hungary	3	6
3	Spain	3	5
4	Israel	3	0

Source: European Aquatics
Final standings
Group F placement

Pos	Team	Pld	Pts
1	Netherlands	3	7
2	Hungary	3	6
3	Spain	3	5
4	Israel	3	0

Source: European Aquatics
Opponent
Result
Knockout stage
Opponent
Result
Greece
12–11 PSO
Semifinals
Italy
8–4

== Venue ==
The Olympic Swimming Pool Complex hosted the final. This will be the first time they host the final.

2026 Women's European Water Polo Championship final is located in Madeira	Funchal
2026 Women's European Water Polo Championship final is located in Madeira	Olympic Swimming Pool Complex
2026 Women's European Water Polo Championship final is located in Madeira	Capacity: 850

== Match ==
5 February 2026; 19:15	Report	Hungary	10–10; PSO: 3–5	Netherlands	Olympic Pools Complex, Funchal; Referees: Aurely Bouchez (FRA), Hendrik Schopp (GER)
5 February 2026; 19:15	Report	Score by quarters: 3–1, 1–4, 2–2, 4–3			Olympic Pools Complex, Funchal; Referees: Aurely Bouchez (FRA), Hendrik Schopp (GER)
5 February 2026; 19:15	Report	five players 2	Goals	Van de Kraats 3	Olympic Pools Complex, Funchal; Referees: Aurely Bouchez (FRA), Hendrik Schopp (GER)

Hungary
Pos	Num	Player	Goals	Min	Ast	Spr
W	2	Dorottya Szilágyi	0/1	23:08	0	
W	3	Vanda Vályi	2/3	23:12	3	3/4
CF	4	Eszter Varró	2/5	12:48	0	
CF	5	Dalma Dömsödi	0/1	14:09	0	
W	6	Nóra Sümegi	0/1	7:41	0	
CF	7	Tekla Aubéli	0	6:01	0	
W	8	Rita Keszthelyi	2/5	26:09	2	
W	9	Dóra Leimeter	0/1	9:53	0	
CF	10	Nataša Rybanská	0/2	10:31	0	
W	11	Kamilla Faragó	0/2	25:20	0	
W	12	Krisztina Garda	2/5	16:09	0	
W	14	Panna Tiba	2/4	14:02	0	
W	15	Kata Hajdú	DNP			
Goalkeepers
Num	Player		Save		Min	Goals
1	Boglárka Neszmély		6/16 (37.5%)		32:00	0
13	Szonja Golopencza		DNP			
Head coach
Cseh Sándor

Hungary	Statistics	Netherlands
10/34	Goals	10/35
5	Assists	3
3/4	Sprints	1/4

Hungary	Penalties	Netherlands
Garda (penalty scored)	1–1	(penalty scored) L. Rogge
Keszthelyi (penalty missed)	1–2	(penalty scored) Keuning
Leimeter (penalty scored)	2–3	(penalty scored) Van de Kraats
Szilágyi (penalty scored)	3–4	(penalty scored) Schaap
	3–5	(penalty scored) Moolhuijzen

Timeouts
Team	Q1	Q2	Q3	Q4
Hungary	0	1	0	1
Netherlands	0	0	0	2

Netherlands
Pos	Num	Player	Goals	Min	Ast	Spr
CF	2	Christina Hicks	0	10:43	0	
W	3	Simone van de Kraats	3/9	25:27	1	1/1
W	4	Maxine Schaap	0/2	11:24	0	0/2
W	5	Maartje Keuning	2/6	25:07	0	
W	6	Fleurien Bosveld	2/2	10:16	0	0/1
DF	7	Bente Rogge	0	21:52	1	
CF	8	Noa de Vries	0/1	8:31	0	
CF	9	Kitty-Lynn Joustra	1/1	13:18	0	
W	10	Lieke Rogge	1/5	22:22	1	
W	11	Lola Moolhuijzen	1/4	17:36	0	
DF	12	Nina ten Broek	0	16:54	0	
W	14	Pien Gorter	0	5:28	0	
W	15	Linde Haksteen	DNP			
Goalkeepers
Num	Player		Save		Min	Goals
1	Laura Aarts		10/20 (50%)		32:00	0
13	Britt van den Dobbelsteen		DNP			
Head coach
(Greece) Evangelos Doudesis

Assistant referees:
(Portugal) Joao Pinheiro
(Portugal) Maria Barbosa
Video assistant referee:
(Croatia) Lea Saftic
Timekeepers:
Soraia Crespo
Bruno Martins
TWPC Delegates:
(Spain) Angel Moliner
(Turkey) Aysem Ozalp

Match rules

- Four quarters of eight minutes (32 minutes in total).
- Penalty shoot-out if scores still level.

== Squads ==
Hungary
Name	Date of birth	Pos.
Boglárka Neszmély	27 August 2003 (aged 22)	GK
Dorottya Szilágyi	10 November 1996 (aged 29)	W
Vanda Vályi	13 August 1999 (aged 26)	W
Eszter Varró	20 February 2006 (aged 19)	CF
Dalma Dömsödi	26 January 2003 (aged 22)	CF
Nóra Sümegi	2 July 2003 (aged 22)	W
Tekla Aubéli	18 March 2004 (aged 21)	CF
Rita Keszthelyi (C)	10 December 1991 (aged 34)	W
Dóra Leimeter	8 May 1996 (aged 29)	W
Nataša Rybanská	10 April 2000 (aged 25)	CF
Kamilla Faragó	22 November 2000 (aged 25)	W
Krisztina Garda	16 July 1994 (aged 31)	W
Szonja Golopencza	29 November 2005 (aged 20)	GK
Panna Tiba	22 May 2007 (aged 18)	W
Kata Hajdú	27 March 2006 (aged 19)	W

Netherlands
Name	Date of birth	Pos.
Laura Aarts	10 August 1996 (aged 29)	GK
Christina Hicks	3 February 2002 (aged 23)	CF
Simone van de Kraats	15 November 2000 (aged 25)	W
Maxine Schaap	1 November 2000 (aged 25)	W
Maartje Keuning (C)	26 April 1998 (aged 27)	W
Fleurien Bosveld	19 February 1998 (aged 27)	W
Bente Rogge	2 October 1997 (aged 28)	DF
Noa de Vries	5 January 2004 (aged 22)	CF
Kitty-Lynn Joustra	11 January 1998 (aged 28)	CF
Lieke Rogge	30 November 2000 (aged 25)	W
Lola Moolhuijzen	17 August 2004 (aged 21)	W
Nina ten Broek	4 July 2001 (aged 24)	DF
Britt van den Dobbelsteen	6 September 2002 (aged 23)	GK
Pien Gorter	25 June 2006 (aged 19)	W
Linde Haksteen	4 December 2006 (aged 19)	W
