= Aleksandra Antonova (water polo) =

Russian water polo player

Personal information
- Born: 22 December 1991 (age 34) Namangan, Uzbek SSR, Soviet Union
- Height: 5 ft 7 in (1.70 m)
Medal record
Women's water polo
Representing Russia
World Championships
Bronze medal – third place	2011 Shanghai	Team competition
European Championships
Gold medal – first place	2010 Zagreb	Team competition
Universiade
Gold medal – first place	2013 Kazan	Team
Bronze medal – third place	2009 Belgrade	Team

Alexandra Antonova (born 1991) is a Russian water polo player. She is 1.70 m (5 ft 7 in) tall.

At the 2012 Summer Olympics, she competed for the Russia women's national water polo team in the women's event. She participated at the 2011 World Aquatics Championships, where Russia won bronze, the 2012 Olympics, and 2015 World Aquatics Championships.

== See also ==
- List of World Aquatics Championships medalists in water polo
