= Anna Grineva =

Russian water polo player

Personal information
- Born: 31 January 1988 (age 38)
- Height: 185 cm (6 ft 1 in)
- Weight: 87 kg (192 lb)

Sport
- Sport: Water polo
- Club: Spartak Volgograd
Medal record
Women's water polo
Representing Russia
Olympic Games
Bronze medal – third place	2016 Rio de Janeiro	team
Universiade
Gold medal – first place	2013 Kazan	Team
Bronze medal – third place	2009 Belgrade	Team

Anna Grineva (born 31 January 1988) is a water polo player from Russia. She was part of the Russian team at the 2016 Summer Olympics, where the team won the bronze medal.

== See also ==
- List of Olympic medalists in water polo (women)
