= Rita Drávucz =

Hungarian water polo player

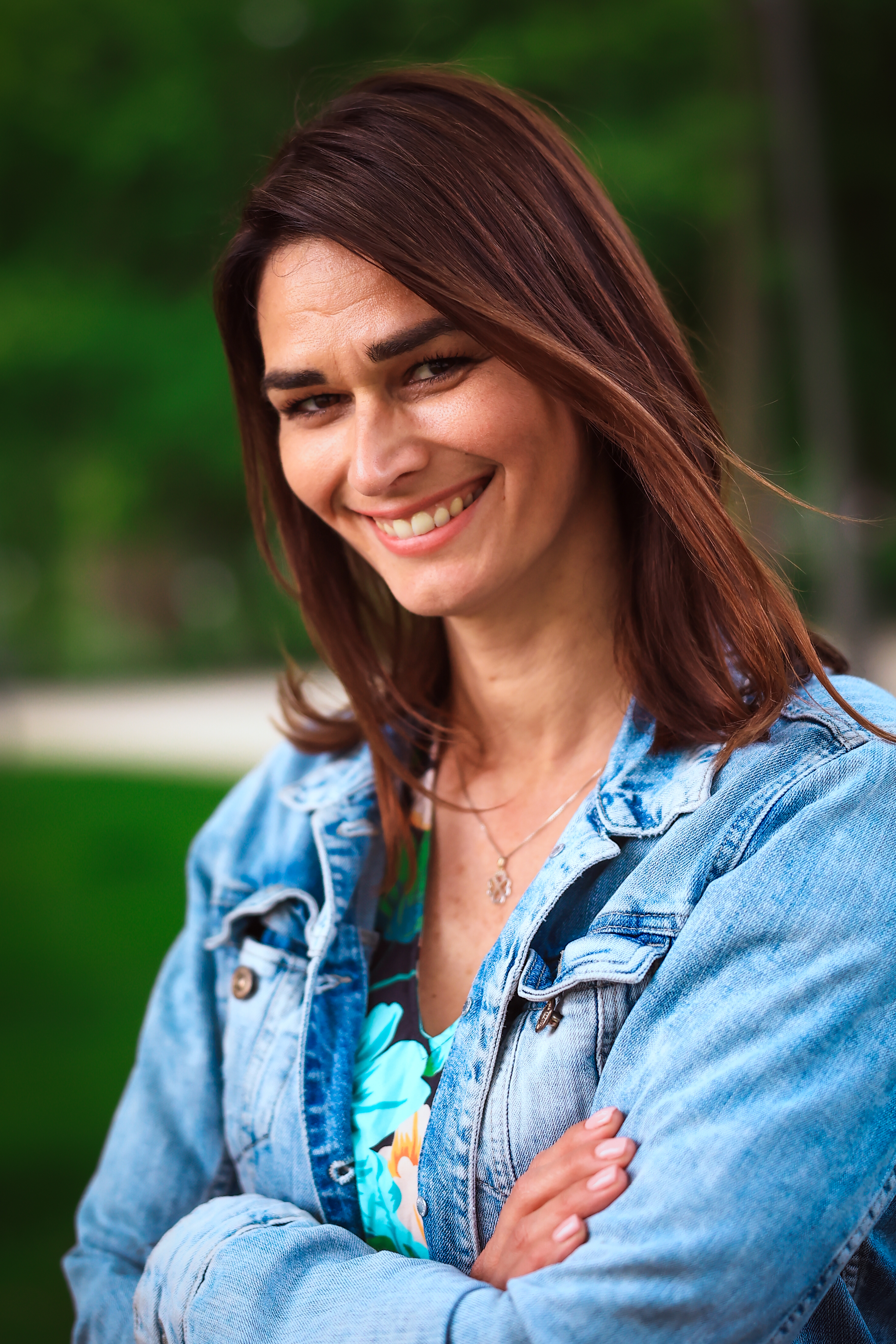

Personal information
- Nationality: Hungarian
- Born: 14 April 1980 (age 46) Szolnok, Hungary
- Height: 1.80 m (5 ft 11 in)
- Weight: 66 kg (146 lb)

Sport
- Country: Hungary
- Sport: Water polo
- Club: Pro Recco
Medal record
Women's water polo
Representing Hungary
World Championship
| Gold medal – first place | 2005 Montréal | Team competition |
| Silver medal – second place | 2001 Fukuoka | Team competition |
European Championship
| Gold medal – first place | 2001 Budapest | Team competition |
| Silver medal – second place | 1995 Vienna | Team competition |
| Silver medal – second place | 2003 Ljubljana | Team competition |
| Bronze medal – third place | 2006 Belgrade | Team competition |
| Bronze medal – third place | 2008 Malaga | Team competition |
| Bronze medal – third place | 2012 Eindhoven | Team competition |
FINA World Cup
| Gold medal – first place | 2002 Perth | Team competition |

Rita Drávucz (born 14 April 1980) is a water polo player from Hungary, who competed for her native country at the 2004 Summer Olympics in Athens, Greece, the 2008 Summer Olympics in Beijing, China and the 2012 Summer Olympics in the London, Great Britain.

Drávucz was a member of the Hungary women's national team that claimed the title at the 2001 Women's European Water Polo Championship in Budapest, Hungary, and 2002 FINA Women's Water Polo World Cup

Since 2011 she plays for Italian top division side Pro Recco.

== See also ==
- Hungary women's Olympic water polo team records and statistics
- List of players who have appeared in multiple women's Olympic water polo tournaments
- List of women's Olympic water polo tournament top goalscorers
- List of world champions in women's water polo
- List of World Aquatics Championships medalists in water polo
