= Hungary women's Olympic water polo team records and statistics =

This article lists various water polo records and statistics in relation to the Hungary women's national water polo team at the Summer Olympics.

The Hungary women's national water polo team has participated in 5 of 6 official women's water polo tournaments.

== Abbreviations ==
Apps	Appearances	Rk	Rank	Ref	Reference	Cap No.	Water polo cap number
Pos	Playing position	FP	Field player	GK	Goalkeeper	ISHOF	International Swimming Hall of Fame
L/R	Handedness	L	Left-handed	R	Right-handed	Oly debut	Olympic debut in water polo
(C)	Captain	p.	page	pp.	pages		

== Team statistics ==
=== Comprehensive results by tournament ===
Note: Results of Olympic qualification tournaments are not included.

Legend

- 1st – Champions
- 2nd – Runners-up
- 3rd – Third place
- 4th – Fourth place
- Q – Qualified for forthcoming tournament

Women's team	2000	2004	2008	2012	2016	2020	Years
Hungary		6th	4th	4th	4th	3rd	5
Total teams	6	8	8	8	8	10	

=== Number of appearances ===
Women's team	Apps	Record streak	Active streak	Debut	Most recent	Best finish	Confederation
Hungary	5	5	5	2004	2020	Third place	Europe – LEN

=== Best finishes ===
Women's team	Best finish	Apps	Confederation
Hungary	Third place (2020)	5	Europe – LEN

=== Finishes in the top four ===
Women's team	Total	Champions	Runners-up	Third place	Fourth place	First	Last
Hungary	4			1 (2020)	3 (2008, 2012, 2016)	2008	2020

=== Medal table ===
Women's team	Gold	Silver	Bronze	Total
Hungary (HUN)	0	0	1	1

== Player statistics ==
=== Multiple appearances ===
The following table is pre-sorted by number of Olympic appearances (in descending order), year of the last Olympic appearance (in ascending order), year of the first Olympic appearance (in ascending order), date of birth (in ascending order), name of the player (in ascending order), respectively.

- Number of four-time Olympians: 0
- Number of three-time Olympians: 2
- Last updated: 26 July 2021.

Female athletes who competed in water polo at three or more Olympics
Apps	Player	Birth	Pos	Water polo tournaments					Age of first/last	ISHOF member	Note	Ref
Apps	Player	Birth	Pos	1	2	3	4	5	Age of first/last	ISHOF member	Note	Ref
3	Rita Drávucz	1980	FP	2004	2008	2012			24/32			
3	Orsolya Takács	1985	FP	2008	2012	2016			23/31			

Note:

- Anikó Pelle is listed in Italy women's Olympic water polo team records and statistics.

=== Top goalscorers ===
The following table is pre-sorted by number of total goals (in descending order), year of the last Olympic appearance (in ascending order), year of the first Olympic appearance (in ascending order), name of the player (in ascending order), respectively.

- Number of goalscorers (40+ goals): 0
- Number of goalscorers (30–39 goals): 0
- Number of goalscorers (20–29 goals): 3
- Last updated: 1 April 2021.

Female players with 20 or more goals at the Olympics
Rk	Player	Birth	L/R	Total goals	Water polo tournaments (goals)					Age of first/last	ISHOF member	Note	Ref
Rk	Player	Birth	L/R	Total goals	1	2	3	4	5	Age of first/last	ISHOF member	Note	Ref
1	Barbara Bujka	1986	Left	27	2012 (12)	2016 (15)				25/29			
2	Rita Keszthelyi	1991	Right	24	2012 (10)	2016 (14)				20/24			
3	Rita Drávucz	1980	Right	23	2004 (7)	2008 (10)	2012 (6)			24/32			

- Official Results Books (PDF): 2004 (pp. 68–69), 2008 (pp. 65–66), 2012 (pp. 359–360), 2016 (pp. 209–210).

=== Goalkeepers ===
The following table is pre-sorted by edition of the Olympics (in ascending order), cap number or name of the goalkeeper (in ascending order), respectively.

Last updated: 1 April 2021.

Abbreviation

- Eff % – Save efficiency (Saves / Shots)

Year	Cap No.	Goalkeeper	Birth	Age	Saves	Shots	Eff %	ISHOF member	Note	Ref
2004	1	Ildikó Sós	1976	27	25	56	44.6%		Starting goalkeeper	
2004	13	Andrea Tóth	1981	23	10	19	52.6%			
2008	1	Patrícia Horváth	1977	30	43	77	55.8%		Starting goalkeeper	
2008	13	Ildikó Sós (2)	1976	31	12	18	66.7%			
2012	1	Flóra Bolonyai	1991	21	17	65	26.2%			
2012	13	Edina Gangl	1990	22	25	47	53.2%			
2016	1	Edina Gangl (2)	1990	26	15	45	33.3%			
2016	13	Orsolya Kasó	1988	27	27	64	42.2%			
Year	Cap No.	Goalkeeper	Birth	Age	Saves	Shots	Eff %	ISHOF member	Note	Ref

- Official Results Books (PDF): 2004 (pp. 68–69), 2008 (pp. 65–66), 2012 (pp. 359–360), 2016 (pp. 209–210).

=== Top sprinters ===
The following table is pre-sorted by number of total sprints won (in descending order), year of the last Olympic appearance (in ascending order), year of the first Olympic appearance (in ascending order), name of the sprinter (in ascending order), respectively.

* Number of sprinters (30+ sprints won): 0

- Number of sprinters (20–29 sprints won): 0
- Number of sprinters (10–19 sprints won): 2
- Number of sprinters (5–9 sprints won): 1
- Last updated: 15 May 2021.

Abbreviation

- Eff % – Efficiency (Sprints won / Sprints contested)

Female players with 5 or more sprints won at the Olympics
Rk	Sprinter	Birth	Total sprints won	Total sprints contested	Eff %	Water polo tournaments (sprints won / contested)					Age of first/last	ISHOF member	Note	Ref
Rk	Sprinter	Birth	Total sprints won	Total sprints contested	Eff %	1	2	3	4	5	Age of first/last	ISHOF member	Note	Ref
1	Ágnes Valkai	1981	14	24	58.3%	2004 (4/5)	2008 (10/19)				23/27			
2	Rita Keszthelyi	1991	11	25	44.0%	2012 (1/5)	2016 (10/20)				20/24			
3	Rita Drávucz	1980	9	27	33.3%	2004 (6/8)	2008 (0/0)	2012 (3/19)			24/32			

- Official Results Books (PDF): 2004 (pp. 68–69), 2008 (pp. 65–66), 2012 (pp. 359–360), 2016 (pp. 209–210).

Note:

- Anikó Pelle is listed in Italy women's Olympic water polo team records and statistics.

== See also ==
- Hungary men's Olympic water polo team records and statistics
- List of women's Olympic water polo tournament records and statistics
- Lists of Olympic water polo records and statistics
- Hungary at the Olympics

== Sources ==
=== Official Results Books (IOC) ===
PDF documents in the LA84 Foundation Digital Library:

- Official Results Book – 2000 Olympic Games – Water Polo (download, archive)
- Official Results Book – 2004 Olympic Games – Water Polo (download, archive)
- Official Results Book – 2008 Olympic Games – Water Polo (download, archive)

PDF documents on the FINA website:

- Official Results Book – 2012 Olympic Games – Diving, Swimming, Synchronised Swimming, Water Polo (archive) (pp. 284–507)

PDF documents in the Olympic World Library:

- Official Results Book – 2016 Olympic Games – Water Polo (archive)

PDF documents on the International Olympic Committee website:

- Official Results Book – 2020 Olympic Games – Water Polo (archive)
- Official Results Book – 2024 Olympic Games – Water Polo

=== Official Reports (FINA) ===
PDF documents on the FINA website:

- HistoFINA – Water polo medalists and statistics (as of September 2019) (archive) (p. 56)
- 1870–2020 | 150 years of Water Polo – Evolution of its rules (archive)

=== Official website (IOC) ===
Water polo on the International Olympic Committee website:

- Water polo
- Women's water polo

=== Olympedia ===
Water polo on the Olympedia website:

- Water polo
- Women's water polo
- Athlete count for water polo
- Water polo venues
- Water polo at the 2000 Summer Olympics (women's tournament)
- Water polo at the 2004 Summer Olympics (women's tournament)
- Water polo at the 2008 Summer Olympics (women's tournament)
- Water polo at the 2012 Summer Olympics (women's tournament)
- Water polo at the 2016 Summer Olympics (women's tournament)
- Water polo at the 2020 Summer Olympics (women's tournament)

=== Sports Reference ===
Water polo on the Sports Reference website:

- Country Medal Leaders & Athlete Medal Leaders (1900–2016) (archived)
- Women's water polo (2000–2016) (archived)
- Water polo at the 2000 Summer Games (women's tournament) (archived)
- Water polo at the 2004 Summer Games (women's tournament) (archived)
- Water polo at the 2008 Summer Games (women's tournament) (archived)
- Water polo at the 2012 Summer Games (women's tournament) (archived)
- Water polo at the 2016 Summer Games (women's tournament) (archived)

=== Todor66 ===
Water polo on the Todor66 website:

- Water polo at the Summer Games
- Water polo at the 2000 Summer Olympics (women's tournament, women's qualification)
- Water polo at the 2004 Summer Olympics (women's tournament, women's qualification)
- Water polo at the 2008 Summer Olympics (women's tournament, women's qualification)
- Water polo at the 2012 Summer Olympics (women's tournament, women's qualification)
- Water polo at the 2016 Summer Olympics (women's tournament, women's qualification)
- Water polo at the 2020 Summer Olympics (women's tournament, women's qualification)

=== ISHOF ===
International Swimming Hall of Fame (ISHOF) website:

- Honorees Listed by Category – Water Polo
- Honorees Listed by Category – Coaches
- Honorees Listed by Category – Contributors
- Honorees by Country
- Honorees By Last Name
