= Dóra Csabai =

Hungarian water polo player

Personal information
- Born: 20 April 1989 (age 37) Budapest, Hungary
- Height: 5 ft 9 in (1.75 m)
Medal record
Women's water polo
Representing Hungary
European Championships
Gold medal – first place	2016 Belgrade	Team
Bronze medal – third place	2012 Eindhoven	Team
Bronze medal – third place	2014 Budapest	Team
Universiade
Silver medal – second place	2013 Kazan	Team
Silver medal – second place	2009 Belgrade	Team

Dóra Csabai (born 20 April 1989 in Budapest) is a Hungarian female water polo player. At the 2012 Summer Olympics, she competed for the Hungary women's national water polo team in the women's event. She competed again for Hungary at the 2016 Olympics. On both occasions, the Hungarian team finished in 4th place. She is 5 feet 9 inches (1.75 m) tall.
