= Anett Györe =

Hungarian water polo player (born 1981)

Personal information
- Full name: Anett Tímea Györe
- Born: 10 December 1981 (age 44) Budapest, Hungary
Medal record
Women's water polo
Representing Hungary
European Championship
Silver medal – second place	2003 Ljubljana	Team competition
FINA World Cup
Gold medal – first place	2002 Perth	Team competition
Universiade
Silver medal – second place	2009 Belgrade	Team

Anett Tímea Györe (born 10 December 1981) is a Hungarian water polo player who competed at the 2004 Summer Olympics in Athens, Greece, where she finished in sixth place with the Hungary women's national team. A year earlier she was on the side that claimed the silver medal at the European Championship in Ljubljana, Slovenia.
