= Edina Gangl =

Hungarian water polo player (born 1990)

Personal information
- Nationality: Hungarian
- Born: 25 June 1990 (age 36) Mosonmagyaróvár, Hungary
- Height: 1.81 m (5 ft 11 in)
- Weight: 64 kg (141 lb)

Sport
- Sport: Water polo
- Position: Goalkeeper
- Current club: PAOK
Medal record
Women's water polo
Representing Hungary
Olympic Games
Bronze medal – third place	2020 Tokyo	Team
World Championships
Silver medal – second place	2022 Budapest	Team
European Championships
Gold medal – first place	2016 Belgrade
Bronze medal – third place	2012 Eindhoven
Bronze medal – third place	2014 Budapest
Bronze medal – third place	2020 Budapest
Universiade
Silver medal – second place	2013 Kazan	Team
- Updated on 8 August 2023

Edina Gangl (born 25 June 1990) is a Hungarian water polo goalkeeper. At the 2012, 2016 and 2020 Summer Olympics, she competed for the Hungary women's national water polo team in the women's tournament.

== See also ==
- Hungary women's Olympic water polo team records and statistics
- List of women's Olympic water polo tournament goalkeepers
