= Hanna Kisteleki =

Hungarian water polo player

Personal information
- Full name: Hanna Anna Kisteleki
- Born: 10 March 1991 (age 35) Budapest, Hungary
- Height: 173 cm (5 ft 8 in) (2012)
- Weight: 67 kg (148 lb) (2012)
Medal record
Women's water polo
Representing Hungary
European Championships
Gold medal – first place	2016 Belgrade	Team
Bronze medal – third place	2012 Eindhoven	Team
Bronze medal – third place	2014 Budapest	Team
Universiade
Silver medal – second place	2013 Kazan	Team

Hanna Anna Kisteleki (born 10 March 1991 in Budapest) is a Hungarian water polo player. At the 2012 Summer Olympics and 2016 Summer Olympics, she competed for the Hungary women's national water polo team in the women's event. She is 5 ft 8 inches tall. Her sister Dóra is also a water polo player, her mother Ágnes Fajt was a member of the Hungarian national team in rhythmic gymnastics.
