= Qiao Leiying =

Chinese water polo player (born 1989)

Personal information
- Nationality: Chinese
- Born: 24 August 1989 (age 36) Liaoning, China
Medal record
Representing China
Summer Universiade
Gold medal – first place	2009 Belgrade	Team

Qiao Leiying (born 24 August 1989) is a female Chinese water polo player who was part of the silver medal-winning team at the 2007 World Junior Championship. As an 18-year-old, she competed at the 2008 Summer Olympics where the Chinese team placed 5th. She graduated from Chengdu Sport Institute, and worked as an exterior line on the court.
