= Water polo at the 2009 Summer Universiade =

Water polo at the XXV Summer Universiade

The water polo competition in the 2009 Summer Universiade was held at different venues in Serbia between 1–12 July 2009.

== Women ==
Event	Gold	Silver	Bronze
Women's water polo	China (CHN); Yang Jun; Teng Fei; Liu Ping; Sun Yujun; He Jin; Sun Yating; Zhu Jia Yi; Gao Ao; Wang Yi; Ma Huanhuan; Sun Huizi; Qiao Leiying; Wang Ying	Hungary (HUN); Eszter Jankovics; Eszter Győri; Dóra Csabai; Zsuzsanna Huszka; Barbara Bujka; Orsolya Kisteleki; Anett Györe; Kata Menczinger; Patricia Jancso; Eszter Peteri; Szandra Kling; Alexandra Kiss; Orsolya Kasó	Russia (RUS); Ludmila Berdnikova; Lubov Isakova; Maria Akhtyrchenko; Alexandra Antonova; Yulia Buravkova; Anna Grineva; Nelly Bakhrameeva; Natalia Alexandrova; Olexandra Karpovich; Marina Kalyagina; Ekaterina Tankeeva; Ekaterina Zelentsova; Anna Ustyukhina
