= András Merész =

Hungarian water polo player and coach (born 1963)

Personal information
- Born: April 11, 1963 (age 62) Budapest, Hungary

Sport
- Sport: Water polo

András Merész (born 11 April 1963) is a Hungarian water polo coach. He was the head coach of the Hungary women's national water polo team at the 2012 Summer Olympics.
