= Hungary women's national water polo team =

Women's national water polo team representing Hungary

Hungary
- FINA code: HUN
- Association: Hungarian Water Polo Federation
- Confederation: LEN (Europe)
- Head coach: Sándor Cseh; Zoltan David
- Captain: Rita Keszthelyi

FINA ranking (since 2008)
- Current: 4 (as of 1 August 2023)
- Highest: 1 (2021)
- Lowest: 9 (2011)

Olympic Games (team statistics)
- Appearances: 6 (first in 2004)
- Best result: (bronze) (2020)

World Championship
- Appearances: 18 (first in 1986)
- Best result: (gold) (1994, 2005)

World Cup
- Appearances: 12 (first in 1988)
- Best result: (gold) (2002)

World League
- Appearances: 7 (first in 2004)
- Best result: (silver) (2004, 2020, 2022)

European Championship
- Appearances: 21 (first in 1985)
- Best result: (gold) (1991, 2001, 2016)

Media
- Website: waterpolo.hu

The Hungary women's national water polo team represents Hungary in international women's water polo competitions and friendly matches. The team is one of the leading teams in Europe since the early 1990s, claiming the world title at the 1994 World Aquatics Championships in Rome, Italy and at the 2005 World Aquatics Championships in Montreal, Canada.

== Results ==
=== Olympic Games ===
Year	Position
(Greece) 2004	6th place
(China) 2008	4th place
(United Kingdom) 2012	4th place
(Brazil) 2016	4th place
(Japan) 2020	3rd place, bronze medalist(s)
(France) 2024	5th place

=== World Championship ===
Year	Position
(Spain) 1986	5th place
(Australia) 1991	4th place
(Italy) 1994	1st place, gold medalist(s)
(Australia) 1998	7th place
(Japan) 2001	2nd place, silver medalist(s)
(Spain) 2003	5th place
(Canada) 2005	1st place, gold medalist(s)
(Australia) 2007	4th place
(Italy) 2009	7th place
(China) 2011	9th place
(Spain) 2013	3rd place, bronze medalist(s)
(Russia) 2015	9th place
(Hungary) 2017	5th place
(South Korea) 2019	4th place
(Hungary) 2022	2nd place, silver medalist(s)
(Japan) 2023	6th place
(Qatar) 2024	2nd place, silver medalist(s)
(Singapore) 2025	2nd place, silver medalist(s)

=== World Cup ===
Year	Position
(New Zealand) 1988	2nd place, silver medalist(s)
(Netherlands) 1989	3rd place, bronze medalist(s)
(Italy) 1993	3rd place, bronze medalist(s)
(Australia) 1995	3rd place, bronze medalist(s)
(Canada) 1999	4th place
(Australia) 2002	1st place, gold medalist(s)
(China) 2006	5th place
(New Zealand) 2010	6th place
(Russia) 2014	5th place
(United States) 2023	4th place
(China) 2025	2nd place, silver medalist(s)
(Australia) 2026	7th place

=== World League ===
Year	Position
(United States) 2004	2nd place, silver medalist(s)
(Russia) 2005	4th place
(United States) 2010	6th place
(China) 2013	4th place
(China) 2017	4th place
(Hungary) 2019	6th place
(Greece) 2020	2nd place, silver medalist(s)
(Spain) 2022	2nd place, silver medalist(s)

=== European Championship ===
Year	Position
(Norway) 1985	2nd place, silver medalist(s)
(France) 1987	2nd place, silver medalist(s)
(West Germany) 1989	2nd place, silver medalist(s)
(Greece) 1991	1st place, gold medalist(s)
(United Kingdom) 1993	3rd place, bronze medalist(s)
(Austria) 1995	2nd place, silver medalist(s)
(Spain) 1997	5th place
(Italy) 1999	4th place
(Hungary) 2001	1st place, gold medalist(s)
(Slovenia) 2003	2nd place, silver medalist(s)
(Serbia) 2006	3rd place, bronze medalist(s)
(Spain) 2008	3rd place, bronze medalist(s)
(Croatia) 2010	5th place
(Netherlands) 2012	3rd place, bronze medalist(s)
(Hungary) 2014	3rd place, bronze medalist(s)
(Serbia) 2016	1st place, gold medalist(s)
(Spain) 2018	4th place
(Hungary) 2020	3rd place, bronze medalist(s)
(Croatia) 2022	5th place
(Netherlands) 2024	5th place
(Portugal) 2026	2nd place, silver medalist(s)

=== LEN Europa Cup ===
Year	Position
(Spain) 2018	6th place
(Italy) 2019	3rd place, bronze medalist(s)

== Team ==
=== Current squad ===
Roster for the 2026 Women's European Water Polo Championship.

Head coach: Sándor Cseh / Zoltan David

- 1 Boglárka Neszmély GK
- 2 Dorottya Szilágyi
- 3 Vanda Vályi
- 4 Eszter Varró
- 5 Dalma Dömsödi
- 6 Nóra Sümegi
- 7 Tekla Aubéli
- 8 Rita Keszthelyi (C)
- 9 Dóra Leimeter
- 10 Natasa Rybanska
- 11 Kamilla Faragó
- 12 Krisztina Garda
- 13 Golopencza Szonja GK
- 14 Panna Tiba

=== Former squads ===
==== Olympic Games ====
- 2012 – 4th place

- Flóra Bolonyai (GK), Dóra Czigány, Dóra Antal, Hanna Kisteleki, Gabriella Szűcs, Orsolya Takács, Rita Drávucz (C), Rita Keszthelyi, Ildikó Tóth, Barbara Bujka, Dóra Csabai, Katalin Menczinger and Edina Gangl (GK). Head coach: András Merész.

- 2016 – 4th place

- Edina Gangl (GK), Dóra Czigány, Dóra Antal, Hanna Kisteleki, Gabriella Szűcs, Orsolya Takács, Anna Illés, Rita Keszthelyi (C), Ildikó Tóth, Barbara Bujka, Dóra Csabai, Krisztina Garda and Orsolya Kasó (GK). Head coach: Attila Bíró.

- 2020 – (bronze) 3rd place

- Edina Gangl (GK), Dorottya Szilágyi, Vanda Vályi, Gréta Gurisatti, Gabriella Szűcs, Rebecca Parkes, Anna Illés, Rita Keszthelyi (C), Dóra Leimeter, Anikó Gyöngyössy, Natasa Rybanska, Krisztina Garda and Alda Magyari (GK). Head coach: Attila Bíró.

- 2024 – 5th place

- Alda Magyari (GK), Dorottya Szilágyi, Vanda Vályi, Gréta Gurisatti, Geraldine Mahieu, Rebecca Parkes, Brigitta Horváth, Rita Keszthelyi (C), Dóra Leimeter, Natasa Rybanska, Kamilla Faragó, Krisztina Garda and Boglárka Neszmély (GK). Head coach: Attila Mihók.

==== World Championships ====
- 1994 – (gold) Gold Medal

- Katalin Dancsa, Andrea Eke, Zsuzsanna Huff, Zsuzsa Kertész, Ildikó Kuna, Irén Rafael, Katalin Rédei, Edit Sipos, Mercédesz Stieber, Orsolya Szalkay, Krisztina Szremkó, Gabriella Tóth and Noémi Tóth. Head coach: Gyula Tóth.

- 2001 – (silver) Silver Medal

- Katalin Dancsa, Rita Drávucz, Anikó Pelle, Ágnes Primász, Katalin Rédei, Edit Sipos, Ildikó Sós, Mercédesz Stieber, Brigitta Szép, Krisztina Szremkó, Zsuzsanna Tiba, Ágnes Valkai and Erzsébet Valkai. Head coach: Tamás Faragó.

- 2005 – (gold) Gold Medal

- Patrícia Horváth, Eszter Tomaskovics, Khrisctina Serfozo, Dóra Kisteleki, Mercédesz Stieber, Andrea Tóth, Rita Drávucz, Krisztina Zantleitner, Orsolya Takács, Anikó Pelle, Ágnes Valkai, Fruzsina Brávik and Tímea Benkő. Head coach: Tamás Faragó.

- 2013 – (bronze) Bronze Medal

- Flóra Bolonyai, Anna Illés, Dóra Antal, Dóra Kisteleki, Gabriella Szűcs, Orsolya Takács, Ibolya Kitti Miskolczi, Rita Keszthelyi (C), Ildikó Tóth, Barbara Bujka, Krisztina Garda, Katalin Menczinger and Orsolya Kasó. Head coach: András Merész.

- 2022 – (silver) Silver Medal

- Kamilla Faragó, Edina Gangl, Krisztina Garda, Gréta Gurisatti, Rita Keszthelyi (C), Dóra Leimeter, Alda Magyari, Geraldine Mahieu, Zsuzsanna Máté, Rebecca Parkes, Natasa Rybanska, Dorottya Szilágyi, Vanda Vályi. Head coach: Attila Bíró.

- 2025 – (silver) Silver Medal

- Boglárka Neszmély, Dorottya Szilágyi, Vanda Vályi, Eszter Varró, Kinga Peresztegi-Nagy, Nóra Sümegi, Dalma Dömsödi, Rita Keszthelyi (C), Dóra Leimeter, Natasa Rybanska, Kamilla Faragó, Krisztina Garda, Luca Torma, Panna Tiba, Kata Hajdú. Head coach: Sándor Cseh.

==== European Championships ====
- 1993 – (bronze) Bronze Medal

- Katalin Dancsa, Andrea Eke, Alíz Kertész, Mária Konrád, Katalin Nagy, Irén Rafael, Ildikó Rónaszéki, Mercédesz Stieber, Orsolya Szalkai, Brigitta Szép, Ildikó Takács, Gabriella Tóth, Noémi Tóth, and Edit Vincze. Head Coach: Gyula Tóth.

- 1995 – (silver) Silver Medal

- Krisztina Kardos, Gabriella Tóth, Edit Sipos, Andrea Eke, Mercédesz Stieber, Edit Vincze, Katalin Rédei, Irén Rafael, Krisztina Szremkó, Ágnes Primász, Anikó Pelle, Krisztina Zantleitner, Noémi Tóth, Brigitta Szép, and Márta Pápai. Head Coach: Gyula Tóth.

- 2001 – (gold) Gold Medal

- Katalin Dancsa, Rita Drávucz, Anett Györe, Anikó Pelle, Ágnes Primász, Katalin Rédei, Edit Sipos, Ildikó Sós, Mercédesz Stieber, Brigitta Szép, Krisztina Szremkó, Zsuzsanna Tiba, Andrea Tóth, Ágnes Valkai, and Erzsébet Valkai. Head Coach: Tamás Faragó.

- 2003 – (silver) Silver Medal

- Rita Drávucz, Ildikó Sós, Andrea Tóth, Krisztina Szremkó, Ágnes Valkai, Anikó Pelle, Ágnes Primász, Mercédesz Stieber, Anett Györe, Erzsébet Valkai, Zsuzsanna Tiba, Dóra Kisteleki, Tímea Benkő, Edit Sipos, and Krisztina Zantleitner. Head Coach: Tamás Faragó.

- 2012 – (bronze) Bronze Medal

- Flóra Bolonyai, Dóra Csabai, Dóra Antal, Hanna Kisteleki, Gabriella Szűcs, Orsolya Takács, Rita Drávucz (C), Rita Keszthelyi, Ildikó Tóth, Barbara Bujka, Anna Illés, Katalin Menczinger and Edina Gangl. Head Coach: András Merész.

- 2014 – (bronze) Bronze Medal

- Flóra Bolonyai, Dóra Csabai, Dóra Antal, Dóra Kisteleki, Gabriella Szűcs, Orsolya Takács, Hanna Kisteleki, Rita Keszthelyi (C), Ildikó Tóth, Barbara Bujka, Dóra Csabai, Anna Illés and Edina Gangl. Head Coach: András Merész.

- 2016 – (gold) Gold Medal

- Edina Gangl, Dóra Czigány, Dóra Antal, Hanna Kisteleki, Gabriella Szűcs, Orsolya Takács, Anna Illés, Rita Keszthelyi (C), Barbara Bujka, Dóra Csabai, Krisztina Garda, Orsolya Kasó. Head coach: Attila Bíró.

- 2020 – (bronze) Bronze Medal

- Edina Gangl, Dorottya Szilágyi, Zsuzsanna Máté, Gréta Gurisatti, Vanda Vályi, Rebecca Parkes, Anna Illés, Rita Keszthelyi (C), Dóra Leimeter, Anikó Gyöngyössy, Natasa Rybanska, Krisztina Garda and Orsolya Kasó. Head coach: Attila Bíró.

==== Other Tournaments ====
- 2002 FINA World Cup – (gold) Gold Medal

- Tímea Benkő, Rita Drávucz, Anett Györe, Patrícia Horváth, Anikó Pelle, Ágnes Primász, Ildikó Sós, Mercédesz Stieber, Krisztina Szremkó, Zsuzsanna Tiba, Ágnes Valkai, Erzsébet Valkai, and Krisztina Zantleitner. Head Coach: Tamás Faragó.

- 2020 FINA World League – (silver) Silver Medal

- Alda Magyari, Dorottya Szilágyi, Dóra Antal, Gréta Gurisatti, Gabriella Szűcs, Rebecca Parkes, Anna Illés, Rita Keszthelyi (C), Dóra Leimeter, Anikó Gyöngyössy, Vanda Vályi, Natasa Rybanska, Krisztina Garda, Zsuzsanna Máté and Orsolya Kasó Head coach: Attila Bíró.

== Under-20 team ==
Hungary lastly competed at the 2021 FINA Junior Water Polo World Championships where they won the bronze medal.

== See also ==
- Hungary women's Olympic water polo team records and statistics
- Hungary men's national water polo team
- List of world champions in women's water polo
