= Katalin Menczinger =

Hungarian water polo player

Personal information
- Full name: Katalin Mária Menczinger
- Nationality: Hungarian
- Born: 17 January 1989 (age 37) Budapest, Hungary
- Height: 1.79 m (5 ft 10 in)
- Weight: 67 kg (148 lb)

Sport
- Sport: Water polo
- Handedness: Right
- Number: 12
National team
- Years: Team
- 2011: Hungary
Medal record
Women's water polo
Representing Hungary
World Championships
Bronze medal – third place	2013 Barcelona	Team competition
European Championships
Bronze medal – third place	2012 Eindhoven	Team competition
Summer Universiade
Silver medal – second place	2009 Belgrade	Team
Silver medal – second place	2017 Taipei	Team
- Updated on 10 August 2023

Katalin "Kata" Mária Menczinger (born 17 January 1989) is a Hungarian former water polo player. At the 2012 Summer Olympics, she competed for the Hungary women's national water polo team in the women's event. She is 5 ft 10 inches tall. She also competed at the 2011 World Aquatics Championships.

== See also ==
- List of World Aquatics Championships medalists in water polo
