= Heleen Peerenboom =

Dutch water polo player (born 1980)

Personal information
- Full name: Anna Hélène Wilhelmina Peerenboom
- Nationality: Netherlands
- Born: 4 February 1980 (age 46) Haarlem, the Netherlands
- Height: 1.66 m (5 ft 5 in)
- Weight: 61 kg (134 lb)

Sport
- Sport: Water polo

Senior clubs
- Years: Team
- –: Rapido '82, (Haarlem)
National team
- Years: Team
- ?-?: Netherlands

Anna Hélène Wilhelmina "Heleen" Peerenboom (born 4 February 1980) is a Dutch female former water polo player. She was a member of the Netherlands women's national water polo team.

She competed with the team at the 2000 Summer Olympics. She was also part of the national team at the 2001 Women's European Water Polo Championship and 2003 World Aquatics Championships.
