= Ágnes Primász =

Hungarian water polo player

Personal information
- Born: March 5, 1980 (age 46) Dunaújváros, Hungary

Sport
- Sport: Water polo
Medal record
Representing Hungary
World Championship
Silver medal – second place	2001 Fukuoka	Team competition
European Championship
Gold medal – first place	2001 Budapest	Team competition
Silver medal – second place	1995 Vienna	Team competition
Silver medal – second place	2003 Ljubljana	Team competition
FINA World Cup
Gold medal – first place	2002 Perth	Team competition

Ágnes Primász (born 5 March 1980) is a female water polo player from Hungary, who competed for her native country at the 2004 Summer Olympics in Athens, Greece.

Primász became top scorer with fourteen goals at the 2001 Women's European Water Polo Championship in Budapest, Hungary, where she claimed the title with the Hungary women's national team.

== See also ==
- List of World Aquatics Championships medalists in water polo
