= Oleksandra Karpovich =

Russian water polo player

Personal information
- Full name: Oleksandra Andreyevna Karpovich
- Born: 6 June 1986 (age 40) Moscow, Russian SSR, Soviet Union
- Height: 1.60 m (5 ft 3 in)
- Weight: 55 kg (121 lb)

Sport
- Sport: Water polo
- Position: centre forward

Senior clubs
- Years: Team
- ?-?: SKIF Moscow
National team
- Years: Team
- ?-?: Russia
Medal record
Women's Water polo
Representing Russia
Universiade
Bronze medal – third place	2009 Belgrade	Team
Bronze medal – third place	2011 Shenzhen	Team
- Updated on 10 August 2023

Oleksandra Andreyevna Karpovich (Олександра Андреевна Карпович, born 6 June 1986) is a Russian retired water polo player. She was a member of the Russia women's national water polo team, playing as a centre forward.

She represented Russia at the 2008 Summer Olympics. On club level she played for SKIF Moscow in Russia.
