= Anna Illés =

Hungarian water polo player (born 1994)

Personal information
- Full name: Anna Krisztina Illés
- Nationality: Hungarian
- Born: 21 February 1994 (age 32) Budapest, Hungary
- Height: 1.80 m (5 ft 11 in)
- Weight: 70 kg (154 lb)

Sport
- Sport: Water polo
- Position: Driver
- Current club: Ferencváros
Medal record
Women's water polo
Representing Hungary
Olympic Games
| Bronze medal – third place | 2020 Tokyo | Team |
World Championships
| Bronze medal – third place | 2013 Barcelona | Team |
European Championships
| Gold medal – first place | 2016 Belgrade |
| Bronze medal – third place | 2012 Eindhoven |
| Bronze medal – third place | 2014 Budapest |
| Bronze medal – third place | 2020 Budapest |
World League
| Silver medal – second place | 2021 Athens |
- Updated on 7 August 2021

Anna Krisztina Illés (born 21 February 1994) is a Hungarian water polo player. At the 2016 and the 2020 Summer Olympics she competed for the Hungary national team in the women's tournament.

== See also ==
- List of World Aquatics Championships medalists in water polo
