= Gabriella Szűcs (water polo) =

Hungarian water polo player (born 1988)

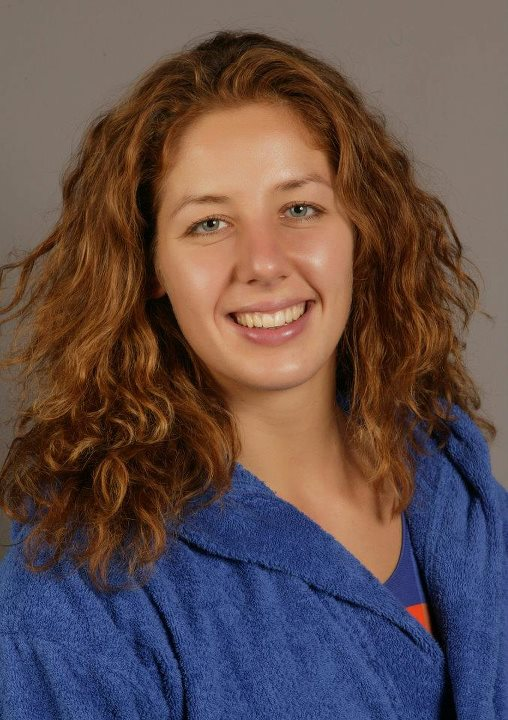
- Szűcs in 2012

Personal information
- Nationality: Hungarian
- Born: 7 March 1988 (age 38) Székesfehérvár, Hungary
- Height: 1.83 m (6 ft 0 in)
- Weight: 74 kg (163 lb)

Sport
- Sport: Water polo
- Position: Centre-back
- Current club: UVSE
Medal record
Women's water polo
Representing Hungary
Olympic Games
Bronze medal – third place	2020 Tokyo	Team
World Championships
Bronze medal – third place	2013 Barcelona	Team
European Championships
Gold medal – first place	2016 Belgrade	Team
Bronze medal – third place	2012 Eindhoven	Team
Bronze medal – third place	2014 Budapest	Team
World League
Silver medal – second place	2021 Athens
- Updated on 7 August 2021

Gabriella Szűcs (born 7 March 1988) is a Hungarian water polo player. At the 2012, 2016 and 2020 Summer Olympics, she competed for the Hungary national team in the women's tournament.

== See also ==
- List of World Aquatics Championships medalists in water polo
