= Zsuzsanna Tiba =

Hungarian water polo player (born 1976)

Personal information
- Nationality: Hungarian
- Born: 31 March 1976 (age 50) Budapest, Hungary
- Height: 1.75 m (5 ft 9 in)
- Weight: 80 kg (180 lb)

Sport
- Sport: Water polo

Senior clubs
- Years: Team
- ?-?: Dunaújvárosi FVE
National team
- Years: Team
- ?-?: Hungary
Medal record
Representing Hungary
World Championships
Silver medal – second place	2001 Fukuoka	Team competition

Zsuzsanna Tiba (born 31 March 1976) is a Hungarian water polo player. She was a member of the Hungary women's national water polo team. She was a part of the team at the 2004 Summer Olympics. On club level she played for Dunaújvárosi FVE in Hungary.

== See also ==
- List of World Aquatics Championships medalists in water polo
