= Krisztina Zantleitner =

Hungarian water polo player (born 1974)

Personal information
- Nationality: Hungarian
- Born: 8 May 1974 (age 52) Tatabánya, Hungary
- Height: 1.84 m (6 ft 0 in)
- Weight: 72 kg (159 lb)

Sport
- Sport: Water polo
- Position: Centre back

Senior clubs
- Years: Team
- ?-? ?-?: Dunaújvárosi FVE; OSC Budapest
National team
- Years: Team
- ?-?: Hungary
Medal record
Representing Hungary
World Championships
Gold medal – first place	2005 Montreal	Team competition

Krisztina Zantleitner (born 8 May 1974) is a Hungarian water polo player. She was a member of the Hungary women's national water polo team, playing as a centre back.

She was a part of the team at the 2004 Summer Olympics and 2008 Summer Olympics. On club level she played for OSC Budapest in Hungary.

== See also ==
- List of world champions in women's water polo
- List of World Aquatics Championships medalists in water polo
