= Krisztina Szremkó =

Hungarian water polo player

Personal information
- Born: January 6, 1972 (age 54) Dunaújváros, Hungary
Medal record
Women's water polo
Representing Hungary
World Championship
Gold medal – first place	1994 Rome	Team competition
Silver medal – second place	2001 Fukuoka	Team competition
European Championship
Gold medal – first place	2001 Budapest	Team competition
Silver medal – second place	1995 Vienna	Team competition

Krisztina Szremkó (born 6 January 1972) is a female water polo player from Hungary, who competed for her native country at the 2004 Summer Olympics in Athens, Greece.

She played professional water polo for Dunaújváros, Eger, BVSC, Szentes, and Mediterrane. Szremkó's biggest success was winning the world title with the Hungary women's national team in 1994.

== See also ==
- List of world champions in women's water polo
- List of World Aquatics Championships medalists in water polo
