= Dóra Antal =

Hungarian water polo player

Personal information
- Born: 9 September 1993 (age 32) Eger, Hungary
- Height: 5 ft 6 in (1.68 m)
Medal record
Women's water polo
Representing Hungary
World Championships
Bronze medal – third place	2013 Barcelona	Team
European Championships
Gold medal – first place	2016 Belgrade	Team
Bronze medal – third place	2012 Eindhoven	Team
Bronze medal – third place	2014 Budapest	Team

Dóra Antal (born 9 September 1993) is a Hungarian female water polo player. At the 2012 Summer Olympics, she competed for the Hungary women's national water polo team in the women's event. She is 5 feet 6 inches (1.68 m) tall, and a student at the University of California, Berkeley.

== See also ==
- List of World Aquatics Championships medalists in water polo
