= Attila Bíró =

Hungarian water polo player and coach

Personal information
- Nationality: Hungarian
- Born: 9 May 1966 (age 60) Eger, Hungary

Sport
- Sport: Water polo

Attila Bíró (born 9 May 1966) is a former Hungarian water polo player. In 2015 he was named Head Coach of Hungary women's national water polo team winning the gold medal at the 2016 Women's European Water Polo Championship in Belgrade, Serbia.
