= Alda Magyari =

Hungarian water polo player

Personal information
- Nationality: Hungarian
- Born: 19 October 2000 (age 26) Budapest, Hungary

Sport
- Sport: Water polo
- Position: Goalkeeper
- Current club: Dunaújváros
Medal record
Women's water polo
Representing Hungary
Olympic Games
Bronze medal – third place	2020 Tokyo	Team
World Championships
Silver medal – second place	2022 Budapest	Team
Silver medal – second place	2024 Doha	Team
World League
Silver medal – second place	2021 Athens

Alda Magyari (born 19 October 2000) is a Hungarian water polo goalkeeper.

At the 2020 Summer Olympics she competed for the Hungary women's national water polo team in the women's tournament.

She participated at the 2016 World Women's Youth Water Polo Championships, 2018 World Women's Youth Water Polo Championships, 2019 Water Polo World League, 2019 World Women's Junior Waterpolo Championships, 2019 World Aquatics Championships, 2020 Women's Water Polo World League.
