= Ildikó Tóth (water polo) =

Hungarian water polo player

Personal information
- Born: 23 April 1987 (age 39) Budapest, Hungary

Sport
- Sport: Water polo
Medal record
Representing Hungary
World Championships
Bronze medal – third place	2013 Barcelona	Team
European Championships
Gold medal – first place	2016 Belgrade	Team
Bronze medal – third place	2012 Eindhoven	Team
Bronze medal – third place	2014 Budapest	Team

Ildikó Tóth (born 23 April 1987) is a Hungarian female water polo player. At the 2012 Summer Olympics, she competed for the Hungary women's national water polo team in the women's event. She is 5 ft 9 in (175 cm) tall.

== See also ==
- List of World Aquatics Championships medalists in water polo
