= Flóra Bolonyai =

Hungarian water polo player

Personal information
- Born: 5 April 1991 (age 35) Budapest, Hungary
- Height: 5 ft 10 in (1.78 m)

Sport
- Club: Szentesi VK
Medal record
Women's water polo
Representing Hungary
World Championships
Bronze medal – third place	2013 Barcelona	Team
European Championships
Bronze medal – third place	2012 Eindhoven	Team
Bronze medal – third place	2014 Budapest	Team
Summer Universiade
Silver medal – second place	2017 Taipei	Team

Flóra Bolonyai (born 5 April 1991 in Budapest) is a Hungarian water polo goalkeeper. At the 2012 Summer Olympics, she competed for the Hungary women's national water polo team in the women's event. She is 5 feet 10 inches (1.78 metres) tall.

In 2013, she won the NCAA Women's Water Polo Championship with USC Trojans.

== See also ==
- Hungary women's Olympic water polo team records and statistics
- List of women's Olympic water polo tournament goalkeepers
- List of World Aquatics Championships medalists in water polo
