= Orsolya Kasó =

Hungarian water polo player (born 1988)

Personal information
- Full name: Orsolya Csehó-Kovácsné Kasó
- Born: 22 November 1988 (age 37) Budapest, Hungary

Sport
- Country: Hungary
- Sport: water polo
Medal record
World Championships
Bronze medal – third place	2013 Barcelona	Team competition
European Championships
Gold medal – first place	2016 Belgrade	Team
Universiade
Silver medal – second place	2009 Belgrade	Team
- Updated on 10 August 2023

Orsolya Csehó-Kovácsné Kasó (born 22 November 1988) is a Hungarian water polo goalkeeper.

She was part of the Hungarian team winning the bronze medal at the 2013 World Aquatics Championships in Barcelona, Spain.

== See also ==
- Hungary women's Olympic water polo team records and statistics
- List of women's Olympic water polo tournament goalkeepers
- List of World Aquatics Championships medalists in water polo
