= Mascha Geurts =

Dutch water polo player (born 1973)

Personal information
- Born: December 9, 1973; Nijmegen, Netherlands

Sport
- Sport: Water polo

Mascha Geurts (born December 9, 1973) is a retired water polo goalkeeper from the Netherlands. She made her debut for the Women's National Team in 2001, and was on the squad that won the competed at the 2001 World Championship in Fukuoka, Japan.

Geurts competed for her native country at the 2001 European Championship in Budapest, Hungary, finishing in fifth place. Her biggest success came in 2002, when the Dutch were finalist in the six-nations tournament in Monte-Rotondo, Italy. She currently plays with Thetis Gendt. They play in the Dutch 1st class (minor league).
