= Brigitta Horváth =

Hungarian water polo player

Personal information
- Nationality: Hungarian
- Born: 14 May 1996 (age 29)
- Height: 174 cm (5 ft 9 in)

Brigitta Horváth (born 14 May 1996) is a Hungarian water polo player. She represented Hungary at the 2024 Summer Olympics.
