= Ildikó Sós =

Hungarian water polo player (born 1976)

Personal information
- Full name: Ildikó Zirighné Sós
- Nationality: Hungarian
- Born: 27 December 1976 (age 49) Tatabánya, Hungary
- Height: 1.76 m (5 ft 9 in)
- Weight: 67 kg (148 lb)

Sport
- Sport: Water polo
- Position: goalkeeper

Senior clubs
- Years: Team
- ?-? ?-?: Dunaújvárosi Főiskola VE; OSC Budapest
National team
- Years: Team
- ?-?: Hungary
Medal record
Representing Hungary
World Championships
Silver medal – second place	2001 Fukuoka	Team competition

Ildikó Zirighné Sós (born 27 December 1976) is a Hungarian water polo player. She was a member of the Hungary women's national water polo team, playing as a goalkeeper.

She was a part of the team at the 2004 Summer Olympics and 2008 Summer Olympics. On club level she played for OSC Budapest in Hungary.

== See also ==
- Hungary women's Olympic water polo team records and statistics
- List of women's Olympic water polo tournament goalkeepers
- List of World Aquatics Championships medalists in water polo
