= Ágnes Valkai =

Hungarian water polo player (born 1981)

Personal information
- Nationality: Hungarian
- Born: 27 February 1981 (age 45) Lajosmizse, Hungary
- Height: 1.68 m (5 ft 6 in)
- Weight: 64 kg (141 lb)

Sport
- Sport: Water polo
- Position: Driver

Senior clubs
- Years: Team
- ?-? ?-?: Roma; Olympiacos
National team
- Years: Team
- ?-?: Hungary
Medal record
Women's water polo
Representing Hungary
World Championships
Gold medal – first place	2005 Montréal	Team
European Championships
Bronze medal – third place	2006 Belgrade	Team

Ágnes Valkai (born 27 February 1981) is a Hungarian water polo player. She was a member of the Hungary women's national water polo team, playing as a driver. She was a part of the Hungary team that claimed the gold medal at the 2005 FINA World Championship in Montreal, Quebec, Canada. She was also a part of the team at the 2004 Summer Olympics and 2008 Summer Olympics. On the club level, she played for Olympiacos in Greece and for Roma in Italy.

She is the younger sister of water polo player Erzsébet Valkai.

== See also ==
- Hungary women's Olympic water polo team records and statistics
- List of world champions in women's water polo
- List of World Aquatics Championships medalists in water polo
