= Water polo at the 2013 Summer Universiade – Women's tournament =

Women's water polo at the XXVII Summer Universiade
- Venue: various
- Dates: July 5, 2013 – July 17, 2013

Medalists
1st place, gold medalist(s)		Russia (RUS)
2nd place, silver medalist(s)		Hungary (HUN)
3rd place, bronze medalist(s)		Italy (ITA)

The women's tournament of water polo at the 2013 Summer Universiade was held from July 5 to 17 in Kazan, Russia.

== Preliminary round ==
=== Group A ===
Team	GP	W	D	L	GF	GA	GD	Pts
Russia	3	3	0	0	67	20	+47	6
Canada	3	2	0	1	28	41	–13	4
Italy	3	1	0	2	35	36	–1	2
Japan	3	0	0	3	18	51	–33	0

6 July 2013; 13:00	Report	Russia	24–5	Japan	Olymp Swimming Pool; Referees: Boros-Djevi (AUS), Rodrigues (BRA)
6 July 2013; 13:00	Report	Score by quarters: 5–1, 6–0, 8–2, 5–2			Olymp Swimming Pool; Referees: Boros-Djevi (AUS), Rodrigues (BRA)
6 July 2013; 13:00	Report	Beliaeva 7	Goals	Kakiichi 2	Olymp Swimming Pool; Referees: Boros-Djevi (AUS), Rodrigues (BRA)

6 July 2013; 13:00	Report	Italy	10–11	Canada	Burevestnik Swimming Pool; Referees: Birri (HUN), Matijasevic (MNE)
6 July 2013; 13:00	Report	Score by quarters: 2–1, 1–3, 3–3, 4–4			Burevestnik Swimming Pool; Referees: Birri (HUN), Matijasevic (MNE)
6 July 2013; 13:00	Report	Savioli 3	Goals	Fournier 6	Burevestnik Swimming Pool; Referees: Birri (HUN), Matijasevic (MNE)

8 July 2013; 17:00	Report	Italy	14–6	Japan	Olymp Swimming Pool; Referees: Dhossche (BEL), Rakovic-Krstonovic (SRB)
8 July 2013; 17:00	Report	Score by quarters: 3–0, 3–3, 4–0, 4–3			Olymp Swimming Pool; Referees: Dhossche (BEL), Rakovic-Krstonovic (SRB)
8 July 2013; 17:00	Report	Motta, Barzon 4	Goals	Kakiichi, Mori 2	Olymp Swimming Pool; Referees: Dhossche (BEL), Rakovic-Krstonovic (SRB)

8 July 2013; 20:00	Report	Russia	24–4	Canada	Olymp Swimming Pool; Referees: Carney (AUS), Birri (HUN)
8 July 2013; 20:00	Report	Score by quarters: 6–2, 7–0, 4–0, 7–2			Olymp Swimming Pool; Referees: Carney (AUS), Birri (HUN)
8 July 2013; 20:00	Report	Beliaeva 6	Goals	four players 1	Olymp Swimming Pool; Referees: Carney (AUS), Birri (HUN)

10 July 2013; 15:30	Report	Canada	13–7	Japan	Olymp Swimming Pool; Referees: Rodrigues (BRA), Rakovic-Krstonovic (SRB)
10 July 2013; 15:30	Report	Score by quarters: 4–2, 3–2, 4–1, 2–2			Olymp Swimming Pool; Referees: Rodrigues (BRA), Rakovic-Krstonovic (SRB)
10 July 2013; 15:30	Report	three players 3	Goals	three players 2	Olymp Swimming Pool; Referees: Rodrigues (BRA), Rakovic-Krstonovic (SRB)

10 July 2013; 20:00	Report	Italy	11–19	Russia	Olymp Swimming Pool; Referees: Birri (HUN), Peila (USA)
10 July 2013; 20:00	Report	Score by quarters: 3–4, 1–2, 3–6, 4–7			Olymp Swimming Pool; Referees: Birri (HUN), Peila (USA)
10 July 2013; 20:00	Report	Motta, Verde 3	Goals	Lisunova 6	Olymp Swimming Pool; Referees: Birri (HUN), Peila (USA)

=== Group B ===
Team	GP	W	D	L	GF	GA	GD	Pts
Hungary	3	2	1	0	30	19	+11	5
Australia	3	1	1	1	23	25	–2	3
France	3	1	1	1	24	24	0	3
United States	3	0	1	2	16	25	–9	1

6 July 2013; 11:30	Report	United States	5–12	Hungary	Olymp Swimming Pool; Referees: Deslieres (CAN), Vasenin (RUS)
6 July 2013; 11:30	Report	Score by quarters: 1–4, 1–4, 3–2, 0–2			Olymp Swimming Pool; Referees: Deslieres (CAN), Vasenin (RUS)
6 July 2013; 11:30	Report	Mutafyan 2	Goals	Somhegyi 3	Olymp Swimming Pool; Referees: Deslieres (CAN), Vasenin (RUS)

6 July 2013; 11:30	Report	Australia	11–9	France	Burevestnik Swimming Pool; Referees: Shimizu (JPN), Mebuke (GEO)
6 July 2013; 11:30	Report	Score by quarters: 4–1, 2–2, 3–3, 2–3			Burevestnik Swimming Pool; Referees: Shimizu (JPN), Mebuke (GEO)
6 July 2013; 11:30	Report	King 3	Goals	Guillet 5	Burevestnik Swimming Pool; Referees: Shimizu (JPN), Mebuke (GEO)

8 July 2013; 15:30	Report	Australia	6–10	Hungary	Olymp Swimming Pool; Referees: Riccitelli (ITA), Vasenin (RUS)
8 July 2013; 15:30	Report	Score by quarters: 2–5, 0–1, 3–1, 1–3			Olymp Swimming Pool; Referees: Riccitelli (ITA), Vasenin (RUS)
8 July 2013; 15:30	Report	Armit 2	Goals	three players 2	Olymp Swimming Pool; Referees: Riccitelli (ITA), Vasenin (RUS)

8 July 2013; 18:30	Report	United States	5–7	France	Olymp Swimming Pool; Referees: Murray (CAN), Tahara (JPN)
8 July 2013; 18:30	Report	Score by quarters: 1–2, 1–2, 2–2, 1–1			Olymp Swimming Pool; Referees: Murray (CAN), Tahara (JPN)
8 July 2013; 18:30	Report	five players 1	Goals	Clomes, Tardy 2	Olymp Swimming Pool; Referees: Murray (CAN), Tahara (JPN)

10 July 2013; 17:00	Report	France	8–8	Hungary	Olymp Swimming Pool; Referees: Shimizu (JPN), Gerzanich (RUS)
10 July 2013; 17:00	Report	Score by quarters: 4–1, 1–2, 1–2, 2–3			Olymp Swimming Pool; Referees: Shimizu (JPN), Gerzanich (RUS)
10 July 2013; 17:00	Report	Guillet, Clomes 3	Goals	Somhegyi 3	Olymp Swimming Pool; Referees: Shimizu (JPN), Gerzanich (RUS)

10 July 2013; 18:30	Report	Australia	6–6	United States	Olymp Swimming Pool; Referees: Mebuke (GEO), Riccitelli (ITA)
10 July 2013; 18:30	Report	Score by quarters: 1–1, 1–0, 2–2, 2–3			Olymp Swimming Pool; Referees: Mebuke (GEO), Riccitelli (ITA)
10 July 2013; 18:30	Report	six players 1	Goals	Young 3	Olymp Swimming Pool; Referees: Mebuke (GEO), Riccitelli (ITA)

== Classification rounds ==
=== 5th–8th place ===
14 July 2013; 15:30	Report	United States	5–9	Australia	Burevestnik Swimming Pool; Referees: Gerzanich (RUS), Rakovic-Krstonosic (SRB)
14 July 2013; 15:30	Report	Score by quarters: 0–4, 2–1, 2–2, 1–2			Burevestnik Swimming Pool; Referees: Gerzanich (RUS), Rakovic-Krstonosic (SRB)
14 July 2013; 15:30	Report	Young 2	Goals	Symons 3	Burevestnik Swimming Pool; Referees: Gerzanich (RUS), Rakovic-Krstonosic (SRB)

14 July 2013; 17:00	Report	France	4–10	Japan	Burevestnik Swimming Pool; Referees: Carney (AUS), Birri (HUN)
14 July 2013; 17:00	Report	Score by quarters: 0–5, 2–1, 2–3, 0–1			Burevestnik Swimming Pool; Referees: Carney (AUS), Birri (HUN)
14 July 2013; 17:00	Report	Guillet 3	Goals	three players 2	Burevestnik Swimming Pool; Referees: Carney (AUS), Birri (HUN)

=== 7th-place game ===
16 July 2013; 15:00	Report	United States	8–9 (OT)	France	Burevestnik Swimming Pool; Referees: Rodrigues (BRA), Shimizu (JPN)
16 July 2013; 15:00	Report	Score by quarters: 2–2, 3–3, 2–2, 1–1 OT: 0–1			Burevestnik Swimming Pool; Referees: Rodrigues (BRA), Shimizu (JPN)
16 July 2013; 15:00	Report	Schroeder 3	Goals	Tardy 3	Burevestnik Swimming Pool; Referees: Rodrigues (BRA), Shimizu (JPN)

=== 5th-place game ===
16 July 2013; 16:30	Report	Australia	12–6	Japan	Burevestnik Swimming Pool; Referees: Murray (CAN), Vasenin (RUS)
16 July 2013; 16:30	Report	Score by quarters: 0–1, 5–3, 4–2, 3–0			Burevestnik Swimming Pool; Referees: Murray (CAN), Vasenin (RUS)
16 July 2013; 16:30	Report	King 4	Goals	Sugiyama 3	Burevestnik Swimming Pool; Referees: Murray (CAN), Vasenin (RUS)

== Final round ==
Quarterfinals
A1	Russia	20
B4	United States	7
A3	Italy	13
B2	Australia	7
A2	Canada	9
B3	France	8
A4	Japan	5
B1	Hungary	16

Semifinals
A1	Russia	14
A3	Italy	7
A2	Canada	6
B1	Hungary	7

Gold-medal game
A1	Russia	18
B1	Hungary	11
Bronze-medal game
A3	Italy	6
A2	Canada	5

=== Quarterfinals ===
12 July 2013; 15:30	Report	Canada	9–8	France	Burevestnik Swimming Pool; Referees: Stavropoulos (GRE), Carney (AUS)
12 July 2013; 15:30	Report	Score by quarters: 3–1, 3–3, 2–1, 1–3			Burevestnik Swimming Pool; Referees: Stavropoulos (GRE), Carney (AUS)
12 July 2013; 15:30	Report	Lekness, Fournier 3	Goals	Guillet, Tardy 2	Burevestnik Swimming Pool; Referees: Stavropoulos (GRE), Carney (AUS)

12 July 2013; 17:00	Report	Italy	13–7	Australia	Burevestnik Swimming Pool; Referees: Deslieres (CAN), Vasenin (RUS)
12 July 2013; 17:00	Report	Score by quarters: 2–0, 4–2, 4–3, 3–2			Burevestnik Swimming Pool; Referees: Deslieres (CAN), Vasenin (RUS)
12 July 2013; 17:00	Report	Bartolini, Barzon 3	Goals	Colenso 3	Burevestnik Swimming Pool; Referees: Deslieres (CAN), Vasenin (RUS)

12 July 2013; 18:30	Report	Japan	5–16	Hungary	Burevestnik Swimming Pool; Referees: Rodrigues (BRA), Bianco (ITA)
12 July 2013; 18:30	Report	Score by quarters: 1–4, 1–7, 1–3, 2–2			Burevestnik Swimming Pool; Referees: Rodrigues (BRA), Bianco (ITA)
12 July 2013; 18:30	Report	Nakata 2	Goals	Somhegyi 5	Burevestnik Swimming Pool; Referees: Rodrigues (BRA), Bianco (ITA)

12 July 2013; 20:00	Report	Russia	20–7	United States	Burevestnik Swimming Pool; Referees: Dhossche (BEL), Murray (CAN)
12 July 2013; 20:00	Report	Score by quarters: 4–2, 6–2, 6–2, 4–1			Burevestnik Swimming Pool; Referees: Dhossche (BEL), Murray (CAN)
12 July 2013; 20:00	Report	Lisunova 8	Goals	Hale, Young 2	Burevestnik Swimming Pool; Referees: Dhossche (BEL), Murray (CAN)

=== Semifinals ===
14 July 2013; 18:30	Report	Russia	14–7	Italy	Burevestnik Swimming Pool; Referees: David (FRA), Peila (USA)
14 July 2013; 18:30	Report	Score by quarters: 6–1, 2–1, 4–2, 2–3			Burevestnik Swimming Pool; Referees: David (FRA), Peila (USA)
14 July 2013; 18:30	Report	Prokofyeva 5	Goals	Savioli 3	Burevestnik Swimming Pool; Referees: David (FRA), Peila (USA)

14 July 2013; 20:00	Report	Canada	6–7	Hungary	Burevestnik Swimming Pool; Referees: Dhossche (BEL), Matijasevic (MNE)
14 July 2013; 20:00	Report	Score by quarters: 0–4, 2–2, 3–1, 1–0			Burevestnik Swimming Pool; Referees: Dhossche (BEL), Matijasevic (MNE)
14 July 2013; 20:00	Report	McKee 2	Goals	Csabai 3	Burevestnik Swimming Pool; Referees: Dhossche (BEL), Matijasevic (MNE)

=== Bronze-medal match ===
16 July 2013; 18:00	Report	Italy	6–5	Canada	Burevestnik Swimming Pool; Referees: Birri (HUN), Rakovic-Krstonosic (SRB)
16 July 2013; 18:00	Report	Score by quarters: 1–2, 2–1, 2–1, 1–1			Burevestnik Swimming Pool; Referees: Birri (HUN), Rakovic-Krstonosic (SRB)
16 July 2013; 18:00	Report	six players 1	Goals	Fournier 3	Burevestnik Swimming Pool; Referees: Birri (HUN), Rakovic-Krstonosic (SRB)

=== Gold-medal match ===
16 July 2013; 19:45	Report	Russia	18–11	Hungary	Burevestnik Swimming Pool; Referees: Mebuke (GEO), Deslieres (CAN)
16 July 2013; 19:45	Report	Score by quarters: 6–4, 6–2, 1–1, 5–4			Burevestnik Swimming Pool; Referees: Mebuke (GEO), Deslieres (CAN)
16 July 2013; 19:45	Report	Lisunova 6	Goals	Kisteleki 4	Burevestnik Swimming Pool; Referees: Mebuke (GEO), Deslieres (CAN)

== Final standings ==
Place	Team	Score
1st place, gold medalist(s)	Russia	6–0–0
2nd place, silver medalist(s)	Hungary	4–1–1
3rd place, bronze medalist(s)	Italy	3–0–3
4	Canada	3–0–3
5	Australia	3–1–2
6	Japan	1–0–5
7	France	2–1–3
8	United States	0–1–5
