= Mercédesz Stieber =

Hungarian water polo player

Personal information
- Born: 4 September 1974 (age 51) Budapest, Hungary
Medal record
Women's water polo
Representing Hungary
World Championship
Gold medal – first place	1994 Rome	Team competition
Gold medal – first place	2005 Montréal	Team competition
Silver medal – second place	2001 Fukuoka	Team competition
European Championship
Gold medal – first place	1991 Athens	Team competition
Gold medal – first place	2001 Budapest	Team competition
Silver medal – second place	1989 Bonn	Team competition
Silver medal – second place	1995 Vienna	Team competition
Silver medal – second place	2003 Ljubljana	Team competition
Bronze medal – third place	1993 Leeds	Team competition
Bronze medal – third place	2006 Belgrade	Team competition

Mercédesz Stieber (born 4 September 1974) is a water polo player from Hungary, who competed for her native country at the 2004 Summer Olympics in Athens, Greece and Beijing 2008. She won the 1994 and 2005 World Championships and the 1991 and 2001 European Championships.

At club level she has played in Hungary and Italy for Budapest Honvéd, Orvosegyetem SC, Szentesi VK (1992–96), Gifa Palermo (1996–01), Orizzonte Catania (2001–03), Pescara (2003–04), Fiorentina (2004–09) and RN Imperia, where she currently serves as a player-coach. She has won three European Cups with Szentesi, Catania and Fiorentina; two LEN Trophies with Palermo and Imperia; three Hungarian championships; and three Italian championships.

== See also ==
- List of world champions in women's water polo
- List of World Aquatics Championships medalists in water polo
