= Orsolya Takács =

Hungarian water polo player

Personal information
- Nationality: Hungarian
- Born: 20 May 1985 (age 41) Budapest, Hungary
- Height: 1.90 m (6 ft 3 in)
- Weight: 85 kg (187 lb)

Sport
- Country: Hungary
- Sport: Water polo
- Club: Bologna
Medal record
World Championship
Gold medal – first place	2005 Montréal	Team
Bronze medal – third place	2013 Barcelona	Team
European Championship
Gold medal – first place	2016 Belgrade	Team
Bronze medal – third place	2006 Belgrade	Team
Bronze medal – third place	2008 Malaga	Team
Bronze medal – third place	2012 Eindhoven	Team
Bronze medal – third place	2014 Budapest	Team

Orsolya Takács (born 20 May 1985) is a Hungarian female water polo player. She plays for Bologna in the Italian Championship and is also member of the Hungarian national team.

Among her successes on club level are two Hungarian Championship (2007, 2008) and three Hungarian Cup titles (2007, 2009, 2010). Takács also had successful spells with the Hungarian national team since her debut in 2004, having won a number of medals, including the World Championship gold in 2005 and three European Championship bronze in 2006, 2008 and 2012.

== Clubs ==
- BVSC (2002–2006)
- Budapesti Honvéd SE (2006–2009)
- Szentesi VK (2009–2012)
- Bologna (2012–present)

== See also ==
- Hungary women's Olympic water polo team records and statistics
- List of players who have appeared in multiple women's Olympic water polo tournaments
- List of world champions in women's water polo
- List of World Aquatics Championships medalists in water polo
