= Andrea Tóth =

Hungarian water polo player

Personal information
- Born: 7 August 1981 (age 44) Kecskemét, Hungary

Sport
- Sport: Water polo
Medal record
Representing Hungary
World Championship
Gold medal – first place	2005 Montreal	Team competition
European Championship
Bronze medal – third place	2006 Belgrade	Team competition

Andrea Tóth (born 7 August 1981) is a female water polo player from Hungary, who competed for her native country at the 2004 Summer Olympics in Athens, Greece.

Tóth played for VF Kecskemét, BVSC, Dunaujváros, Volturno Italy and Szentes.

== See also ==
- Hungary women's Olympic water polo team records and statistics
- List of women's Olympic water polo tournament goalkeepers
- List of world champions in women's water polo
- List of World Aquatics Championships medalists in water polo
