= Barbara Bujka =

Hungarian water polo player

Personal information
- Born: 5 September 1986 (age 39) Budapest, Hungary

Sport
- Club: Ferencváros
Medal record
Women's water polo
Representing Hungary
World Championships
Bronze medal – third place	2013 Barcelona	Team
European Championships
Gold medal – first place	2016 Belgrade	Team
Bronze medal – third place	2006 Belgrade	Team competition
Bronze medal – third place	2008 Malaga	Team competition
Bronze medal – third place	2012 Eindhoven	Team
Bronze medal – third place	2014 Budapest	Team
Universiade
Silver medal – second place	2009 Belgrade	Team

Barbara Bujka (born 5 September 1986, Budapest) is a Hungarian female water polo player. At the 2012 Summer Olympics, she competed for the Hungary women's national water polo team in the women's event. She is 5 ft 8.5 inches tall. In 2013–14 season she played for Olympiacos in Greece, winning both the LEN Trophy and the Greek Championship.

She was part of the German women's national water polo team at the 2003 World Aquatics Championships.

Currently she is a trainer of the DSC .

== See also ==
- Hungary women's Olympic water polo team records and statistics
- List of women's Olympic water polo tournament top goalscorers
- List of World Aquatics Championships medalists in water polo
