= Natasa Rybanska =

Hungarian water polo player

Personal information
- Nationality: Hungarian
- Born: 10 April 2000 (age 26) Piešťany, Slovakia
- Height: 1.90 m (6 ft 3 in)
- Weight: 86 kg (190 lb)

Sport
- Sport: Water polo
- Position: Centre-back
- Current club: UVSE
Medal record
Women's water polo
Representing Hungary
Olympic Games
Bronze medal – third place	2020 Tokyo	Team
World Championships
Silver medal – second place	2022 Budapest	Team
Silver medal – second place	2024 Doha	Team
Silver medal – second place	2025 Singapore	Team
European Championships
Silver medal – second place	2026 Funchal
Bronze medal – third place	2020 Budapest
World League
Silver medal – second place	2021 Athens

Natasa Rybanska (Slovak: Nataša Rybanská; born 10 April 2000) is a Slovak-born Hungarian water polo player. At the 2020 Summer Olympics she competed for the Hungary women's national water polo team in the women's tournament.

She participated at the 2019 World Women's Junior Water Polo, 2019 FINA World Championships, 2019 FINA Women's Water Polo World League, 2020 FINA Women's Water Polo World League.
