= Dóra Kisteleki =

Hungarian water polo player (born 1983)

Personal information
- Full name: Dóra Ágnes Kisteleki
- Born: 11 May 1983 (age 43) Budapest, Hungary
Medal record
Women's water polo
Representing Hungary
World Championships
Gold medal – first place	2005 Montréal	Team
Bronze medal – third place	2013 Barcelona	Team
European Championships
Bronze medal – third place	2008 Malaga	Team
Bronze medal – third place	2014 Budapest	Team

Dóra Ágnes Kisteleki (born 11 May 1983) is a Hungarian water polo player who competed at the 2004 Summer Olympics in Athens, Greece, and finished in sixth place with the Hungary women's national team. A year later she was on the side that claimed the world title in Montréal, Quebec, Canada.

== See also ==
- List of world champions in women's water polo
- List of World Aquatics Championships medalists in water polo
