= Dóra Leimeter =

Hungarian water polo player

Personal information
- Nationality: Hungarian
- Born: 8 May 1996 (age 30) Budapest, Hungary
- Height: 1.75 m (5 ft 9 in)
- Weight: 78 kg (172 lb)

Sport
- Sport: Water polo
- Position: Driver
- Current club: BVSC
Medal record
Women's water polo
Representing Hungary
Olympic Games
| Bronze medal – third place | 2020 Tokyo | Team |
World Championships
| Silver medal – second place | 2022 Budapest | Team |
| Silver medal – second place | 2024 Doha | Team |
| Silver medal – second place | 2025 Singapore | Team |
European Championships
| Silver medal – second place | 2026 Funchal |
| Bronze medal – third place | 2020 Budapest |
Summer Universiade
| Silver medal – second place | 2017 Taipei | Team |
World League
| Silver medal – second place | 2021 Athens |

Dóra Leimeter (born 8 May 1996) is a Hungarian water polo player. At the 2020 Summer Olympics she competed for the Hungary women's national water polo team in the women's tournament.
