= 2002 FINA Women's Water Polo World Cup =

Water polo World Cup

Tournament details
- Host country: Australia

Final positions
- Champions: Hungary (1st title)
- Runners-up: United States
- Third place: Canada
- Fourth place: Russia

Official website
- FINA event site

The 2002 FINA Women's Water Polo World Cup was the thirteenth edition of the event, organised by the world's governing body in aquatics, the International Swimming Federation (FINA). The event took place in Perth, Western Australia from 10 to 15 December 2002. Participating teams were the eight best teams from the last World Championships in Fukuoka, Japan (2001). The top-five qualified for the 2003 World Aquatics Championships in Barcelona, Spain.

== Teams ==
GROUP A

- Canada
- Italy
- Greece
- Russia

GROUP B

- Australia
- Hungary
- Kazakhstan
- United States

== Preliminary round ==
=== GROUP A ===
	Team	Points	G	W	D	L	GF	GA	Diff
1.	Russia	4	3	2	0	1	24	22	+2
2.	Canada	4	3	2	0	1	21	20	+1
3.	Italy	3	3	1	1	1	25	24	+1
4.	Greece	1	3	0	1	2	17	21	–4

- 10 December 2002

Russia	9 – 7	Canada
Italy	8 – 8	Greece

- 11 December 2002

Canada	6 – 4	Greece
Italy	10 – 8	Russia

- 12 December 2002

Russia	7 – 5	Greece
Canada	8 – 7	Italy

=== GROUP B ===
	Team	Points	G	W	D	L	GF	GA	Diff
1.	United States	5	3	2	1	0	24	9	+15
2.	Hungary	5	3	2	1	0	20	12	+8
3.	Australia	2	3	1	0	2	15	21	–6
4.	Kazakhstan	0	3	0	0	3	11	28	–17

- 10 December 2002

Hungary	5 – 5	United States
Australia	9 – 6	Kazakhstan

- 11 December 2002

Australia	3 – 7	Hungary
United States	11 – 1	Kazakhstan

- 12 December 2002

Hungary	8 – 4	Kazakhstan
Australia	3 – 8	United States

== Quarterfinals ==
- 13 December 2002

Canada	9 – 3	Australia
Hungary	7 – 6	Italy

== Semifinals ==
- 14 December 2002

Russia	6 – 8	Hungary
United States	6 – 4	Canada

== Finals ==
- 13 December 2002 – Seventh place

Greece	7 – 1	Kazakhstan

- 14 December 2002 – Fifth place

Australia	9 – 10	Italy

- 15 December 2002 – Bronze Medal

Canada	6 – 5	Russia

- 15 December 2002 – Gold Medal

Hungary	8 – 7	United States

== Final ranking ==
RANK	TEAM
	Hungary
	United States
	Canada
4.	Russia
5.	Italy
6.	Australia
7.	Greece
8.	Kazakhstan

2002 Women's FINA World Cup winners

Hungary
First title

The top-five qualified for the 2003 World Water Polo Championship in Barcelona, Spain.

== Individual awards ==
- Most Valuable Player
  - ???
- Best Goalkeeper
  - ???
- Top Scorer
  - ???
