= Maartje Keuning =

Dutch water polo player (born 1998)

Personal information
- Nationality: Dutch
- Born: 26 April 1998 (age 28)

Sport
- Sport: Water polo
Medal record
Olympic Games
Bronze medal – third place	2024 Paris	Team
World Championships
Gold medal – first place	2023 Fukuoka	Team
European Championship
Gold medal – first place	2024 Eindhoven
Gold medal – first place	2026 Funchal
World Cup
Silver medal – second place	2023 Long Beach

Maartje Keuning (born 26 April 1998) is a Dutch water polo player. She competed in the 2020 Summer Olympics.
