= Rita Keszthelyi =

Hungarian water polo player (born 1991)

Personal information
- Nationality: Hungarian
- Born: December 10, 1991 (age 34) Budapest, Hungary
- Height: 1.78 m (5 ft 10 in)
- Weight: 67 kg (148 lb)

Sport
- Sport: Water polo
- Position: Driver
- Current club: CN Mataró
Medal record
Women's water polo
Representing Hungary
Olympic Games
| Bronze medal – third place | 2020 Tokyo | Team |
World Championships
| Silver medal – second place | 2022 Budapest | Team |
| Silver medal – second place | 2024 Doha | Team |
| Silver medal – second place | 2025 Singapore | Team |
| Bronze medal – third place | 2013 Barcelona | Team |
European Championships
| Gold medal – first place | 2016 Belgrade |
| Silver medal – second place | 2026 Funchal |
| Bronze medal – third place | 2012 Eindhoven |
| Bronze medal – third place | 2014 Budapest |
| Bronze medal – third place | 2020 Budapest |
World League
| Silver medal – second place | 2021 Athens |

Rita Keszthelyi (born 10 December 1991) is a Hungarian water polo player. At the 2012, 2016 and 2020 Summer Olympics, she competed for the Hungary women's national water polo team in the women's tournament.

She scored two of the goals that helped Hungary win the bronze medal match at the 2020 Olympics. She has played more than 300 water polo matches for Hungary.

== See also ==
- Hungary women's Olympic water polo team records and statistics
- List of women's Olympic water polo tournament top goalscorers
- List of World Aquatics Championships medalists in water polo
