= Anikó Pelle =

Hungarian-Italian water polo player (born 1978)

Personal information
- Born: 28 September 1978 (age 48) Budapest, Hungary
Medal record
Women's water polo
Representing Hungary
World Championship
Gold medal – first place	2005 Montréal	Team competition
European Championships
Bronze medal – third place	2006 Belgrade	Team competition

Anikó Pelle (born 28 September 1978) is a Hungarian and Italian water polo player who played for the University of Southern California from 1999 to 2002, and the Hungary women's national team in the 2004 Summer Olympics in Athens, Greece. In 2000, Pelle received the Peter J. Cutino Award as the nation's top women's collegiate water polo player.

Anikó Pelle was USC's top offensive threat as a 1999 freshman, scoring a team-high 52 goals, leading to All-America honors. With a 3.44 GPA, Pelle made the 1999 American Water Polo Coaches Association All-Academic team. After recording a team-leading 64 goals as a sophomore in 2000, she earned the Peter J. Cutino Award as the nation's top female water polo player. In her 2001 junior season, she was second on the team with 81 goals and again earned All-America honors. Pelle set a school record at USC as a 2002 senior with 254 career goals. Pelle graduated from USC with a degree in business.

Pelle has played with the Hungary national team since 1995, with various club teams in Europe, and participated in several FINA World and European Championships. She has placed second twice and third three times at the Hungarian championships, and was the top scorer in 1998. Pelle's 13 tournament goals, 3 in the final game, led her national team to the gold medal at the women's 2005 World Water Polo Championship in Montreal, Quebec, Canada.

Pelle was among the first of an increasing number of international players competing in U.S. collegiate women's water polo. Because of water polo's increased popularity globally, the influence of international coaches like USC's Jovan Vavic (of the former Yugoslavia) and Canadian Michel Roy at Hawaii, and the perks of attending an American college, international players are attracted to the premier U.S. colleges. She is friends with former U.S. Olympic team member and silver medalist, Bernice Orwig.

She switched to representing Italy and competed for them at the 2012 Summer Olympics, finishing in 7th place.

== See also ==
- Italy women's Olympic water polo team records and statistics
- List of players who have appeared in multiple women's Olympic water polo tournaments
- List of world champions in women's water polo
- List of World Aquatics Championships medalists in water polo
