= Vanda Vályi =

Hungarian water polo player

Personal information
- Nationality: Hungarian
- Born: 13 August 1999 (age 27) Eger, Hungary
- Height: 1.81 m (5 ft 11 in)
- Weight: 64 kg (141 lb)

Sport
- Sport: Water polo
- Position: Driver
- Current club: Ferencváros
Medal record
Women's water polo
Representing Hungary
Olympic Games
Bronze medal – third place	2020 Tokyo	Team
World Championships
Silver medal – second place	2022 Budapest	Team
Silver medal – second place	2024 Doha	Team
Silver medal – second place	2025 Singapore	Team
European Championships
Silver medal – second place	2026 Funchal
Bronze medal – third place	2020 Budapest
World League
Silver medal – second place	2021 Athens

Vanda Vályi (born 13 August 1999) is a Hungarian water polo player. At the 2020 Summer Olympics she competed for the Hungary women's national water polo team in the women's tournament.

She won the Women's LEN Trophy in 2018 playing for Dunaújváros
