= Boglárka Neszmély =

Hungarian water polo player

Personal information
- Nationality: Hungarian
- Born: 27 August 2003 (age 22)
- Height: 174 cm (5 ft 9 in)
Medal record
World Championship
Silver medal – second place	2025 Singapore	Team
European Championship
Silver medal – second place	2026 Funchal

Boglárka Neszmély (born 27 August 2003) is a Hungarian water polo goalkeeper. She represented Hungary at the 2024 Summer Olympics.
