= Krisztina Garda =

Hungarian water polo player

Personal information
- Born: 16 July 1994 (age 32) Budapest, Hungary
- Height: 1.70 m (5 ft 7 in)
- Weight: 84 kg (185 lb)

Sport
- Sport: Water polo
- Position: Driver
- Current club: Dunaújváros
Medal record
Women's water polo
Representing Hungary
Olympic Games
Bronze medal – third place	2020 Tokyo	Team
World Championships
Silver medal – second place	2022 Budapest	Team
Silver medal – second place	2024 Doha	Team
Silver medal – second place	2025 Singapore	Team
Bronze medal – third place	2013 Barcelona	Team
European Championships
Gold medal – first place	2016 Belgrade
Silver medal – second place	2026 Funchal
Bronze medal – third place	2020 Budapest
World League
Silver medal – second place	2021 Athens
Summer Universiade
Gold medal – first place	2019 Naples	Team
Silver medal – second place	2017 Taipei	Team

Krisztina Garda (born 16 July 1994) is a Hungarian water polo player. At the 2016 and the 2020 Summer Olympics she competed for the Hungary women's national water polo team in the women's tournament.

She won the Women's LEN Trophy in 2018 playing for Dunaújváros.

== See also ==
- List of World Aquatics Championships medalists in water polo
