= 2003 Women's European Water Polo Championship =

Tournament details
- Host country: Slovenia
- Venue(s): 1 (in 1 host city)
- Dates: 7 – 14 June
- Teams: 8 (from 1 confederation)

Final positions
- Champions: Italy (4th title)
- Runner-up: Hungary
- Third place: Russia
- Fourth place: Netherlands

Tournament statistics
- Top scorer(s): Daniëlle de Bruijn (NED) (15)

The 2003 Women's European Water Polo Championship was the tenth edition of the bi-annual event, organised by the Europe's governing body in aquatics, the Ligue Européenne de Natation. The event took place in Ljubljana, Slovenia from June 7 to June 14, 2003.

There were two qualification tournaments ahead of the event, held from April 11 to April 13, 2003 in Hamburg, Germany (with Greece, Germany, France, and Ukraine competing) and Eindhoven, Netherlands (Netherlands, Spain, Czech Republic and Great Britain).

== Teams ==
Group A

- Greece
- Germany
- Italy
- Russia

Group B

- Hungary
- Netherlands
- Slovenia
- Spain

== Preliminary round ==
=== Group A ===
	Team	Points	G	W	D	L	GF	GA	Diff
1.	Italy	6	3	3	0	0	33	24	+9
2.	Russia	4	3	2	0	1	30	27	+3
3.	Greece	2	3	1	0	2	16	20	−4
4.	Germany	0	3	0	0	3	22	30	−8

=== Group B ===
	Team	Points	G	W	D	L	GF	GA	Diff
1.	Hungary	6	3	3	0	0	45	14	+31
2.	Netherlands	4	3	2	0	1	43	17	+26
3.	Spain	2	3	1	0	2	32	19	+13
4.	Slovenia	0	3	0	0	3	3	73	−70

== Quarterfinals ==
Netherlands	6–5	Greece
Russia	12–10	Spain

== Semifinals ==
Hungary	7–6	Russia
Italy	7–5	Netherlands

== Finals ==
- June 14, 2003 — Bronze Medal

Netherlands	6–7	Russia

- June 14, 2003 — Gold Medal

Italy	6–5	Hungary

== Final ranking ==
RANK	TEAM
	Italy
	Hungary
	Russia
4.	Netherlands
5.	Greece
6.	Spain
7.	Germany
8.	Slovenia

2003 Women's European champion

Italy
Fourth title

== Individual awards ==
- Most Valuable Player
  - ???
- Best Goalkeeper
  - ???
- Best Scorer
  - Daniëlle de Bruijn (NED) 15 goals
