= 2001 Women's European Water Polo Championship =

Season of the European Water Polo Championship

Tournament details
- Host country: Hungary
- Venue: 1 (in 1 host city)
- Dates: 16 – 23 June
- Teams: 8 (from 1 confederation)

Final positions
- Champions: Hungary (2nd title)
- Runners-up: Italy
- Third place: Russia
- Fourth place: Netherlands

Tournament statistics
- Top scorer: Daniëlle de Bruijn (NED) (15)

The 2001 Women's European Water Polo Championship was the ninth edition of the bi-annual event, organised by the Europe's governing body in aquatics, the Ligue Européenne de Natation. The event took place in Budapest, Hungary from June 16 to June 23, 2001.

== Teams ==
Group A

- Germany
- Greece
- Italy
- Russia

Group B

- France
- Hungary
- Netherlands
- Spain

== Preliminary round ==
=== Group A ===
	Team	Points	G	W	D	L	GF	GA	Diff
1.	Italy	6	3	3	0	0	21	16	+5
2.	Russia	4	3	2	0	1	27	18	+9
3.	Greece	2	3	1	0	2	17	19	−2
4.	Germany	0	3	0	0	3	19	31	−12

- June 16, 2001

Russia	7–6	Greece
Germany	7–9	Italy

- June 17, 2001

Greece	3–5	Italy
Russia	14–5	Germany

- June 18, 2001

Greece	8–7	Germany
Italy	7–6	Russia

=== Group B ===
	Team	Points	G	W	D	L	GF	GA	Diff
1.	Hungary	5	3	2	1	0	38	19	+19
2.	Netherlands	5	3	2	1	0	29	20	+9
3.	Spain	2	3	1	0	2	19	26	−7
4.	France	0	3	0	0	3	10	31	−21

- June 16, 2001

Netherlands	10–2	France
Spain	4–14	Hungary

- June 17, 2001

Netherlands	12–12	Hungary
Spain	9–5	France

- June 18, 2001

Spain	6–7	Netherlands
Hungary	12–3	France

== Quarterfinals ==
- June 19, 2001

Greece	7–5	Netherlands
Russia	11–5	Spain

== Semifinals ==
- June 21, 2001

Hungary	7–6	Russia
Italy	7–1	Greece

== Finals ==
- June 19, 2001 — Seventh place

Germany	7–6	France

- June 21, 2001 — Fifth place

Spain	9–10	Netherlands

- June 23, 2001 — Bronze Medal

Greece	5–8	Russia

- June 23, 2001 — Gold Medal

Hungary	10–8	Italy

== Final ranking ==
RANK	TEAM
	Hungary
	Italy
	Russia
4.	Greece
5.	Netherlands
6.	Spain
7.	Germany
8.	France

2001 Women's European champion

Hungary
Second title

== Individual awards ==
- Most Valuable Player
  - Mercédesz Stieber (HUN)
- Best Goalkeeper
  - Francesca Conti (ITA)
- Best Scorer
  - Ágnes Primász (HUN) — 14 goals
