= Kamilla Faragó =

Hungarian water polo player

Personal information
- Nationality: Hungarian
- Born: 22 November 2000 (age 25)
- Height: 169 cm (5 ft 7 in)
Medal record
World Championship
Silver medal – second place	2025 Singapore	Team
European Championships
Silver medal – second place	2026 Funchal

Kamilla Faragó (born 22 November 2000) is a Hungarian water polo player. She represented Hungary at the 2024 Summer Olympics.
