= Water polo at the 2009 Summer Universiade – Women's tournament =

Water polo at the XXV Summer Universiade

Medalists
| 1st place, gold medalist(s) | | China |
| 2nd place, silver medalist(s) | | Hungary |
| 3rd place, bronze medalist(s) | | Russia |

The women's tournament of water polo at the 2009 Summer Universiade at Belgrade, Serbia began on July 1 and ended on July 11.

== Teams ==
| Africa | Americas | Asia | Europe | Oceania | Automatic qualifiers |
|---|---|---|---|---|---|
| | Canada | China; Japan | Hungary; Italy; Russia | Australia | Serbia – Universiade hosts |

== Preliminary round ==
| Qualified for the semifinals |
| Qualified for the quarterfinals |
| Will play for places 7-8 |

=== Group A ===
| Team | Pld | W | D | L | GF | GA | GD | Pts |
|---|---|---|---|---|---|---|---|---|
| Russia | 3 | 3 | 0 | 0 | 43 | 14 | +29 | 6 |
| Canada | 3 | 2 | 0 | 1 | 26 | 21 | +5 | 4 |
| Serbia | 3 | 1 | 0 | 2 | 15 | 34 | -19 | 2 |
| Japan | 3 | 0 | 0 | 3 | 15 | 30 | -15 | 0 |

| July 1, 2009; 11:20 | Game 2 | Japan | 3–12 | Russia | SRC Banjica; Referees: Taccini (ITA), Redding (USA) |
| July 1, 2009; 11:20 | Game 2 | Score by quarters: 0-4, 0-3, 2-3, 1-2 | | | SRC Banjica; Referees: Taccini (ITA), Redding (USA) |
| July 1, 2009; 11:20 | Game 2 | Magariyama 2 | Goals | Antonova, Karpovich, Tankeeva, Zelentsova 2 | SRC Banjica; Referees: Taccini (ITA), Redding (USA) |

| July 1, 2009; 14:00 | Game 4 | Serbia | 3–9 | Canada | SRC Banjica; Referees: Johnson (AUS), He (CHN) |
| July 1, 2009; 14:00 | Game 4 | Score by quarters: 0-1, 0-3, 1-2, 2-3 | | | SRC Banjica; Referees: Johnson (AUS), He (CHN) |
| July 1, 2009; 14:00 | Game 4 | Knezevic, Vezilic, Masic 1 | Goals | Eggens 3 | SRC Banjica; Referees: Johnson (AUS), He (CHN) |

| July 3, 2009; 11:20 | Game 6 | Japan | 5–10 | Canada | SRC Banjica; Referees: Petik (HUN), Hart (AUS) |
| July 3, 2009; 11:20 | Game 6 | Score by quarters: 2-3, 1-1, 0-4, 2-2 | | | SRC Banjica; Referees: Petik (HUN), Hart (AUS) |
| July 3, 2009; 11:20 | Game 6 | Tsumori 2 | Goals | Eggens 3 | SRC Banjica; Referees: Petik (HUN), Hart (AUS) |

| July 3, 2009; 16:20 | Game 8 | Serbia | 4–18 | Russia | SRC Banjica; Referees: Riccitelli (ITA), Fekete (HUN) |
| July 3, 2009; 16:20 | Game 8 | Score by quarters: 0-6, 1-6, 1-2, 2-4 | | | SRC Banjica; Referees: Riccitelli (ITA), Fekete (HUN) |
| July 3, 2009; 16:20 | Game 8 | Corovic 3 | Goals | Antonova, Buravkova 3 | SRC Banjica; Referees: Riccitelli (ITA), Fekete (HUN) |

| July 5, 2009; 10:20 | Game 9 | Russia | 13–7 | Canada | SRC Banjica; Referees: Taccini (ITA), Petik (HUN) |
| July 5, 2009; 10:20 | Game 9 | Score by quarters: 2-0, 4-3, 4-1, 3-3 | | | SRC Banjica; Referees: Taccini (ITA), Petik (HUN) |
| July 5, 2009; 10:20 | Game 9 | Zelentsova 3 | Goals | Majuri, Kaukinen 2 | SRC Banjica; Referees: Taccini (ITA), Petik (HUN) |

| July 5, 2009; 15:00 | Game 11 | Japan | 7–8 | Serbia | SRC Banjica; Referees: He (CHN), Riccitelli (ITA) |
| July 5, 2009; 15:00 | Game 11 | Score by quarters: 2-4, 3-4, 1-0, 1-0 | | | SRC Banjica; Referees: He (CHN), Riccitelli (ITA) |
| July 5, 2009; 15:00 | Game 11 | Magariyama 3 | Goals | Corovic, Vezilic, Ivkovic 2 | SRC Banjica; Referees: He (CHN), Riccitelli (ITA) |

=== Group B ===
| Team | Pld | W | D | L | GF | GA | GD | Pts |
|---|---|---|---|---|---|---|---|---|
| China | 3 | 3 | 0 | 0 | 39 | 18 | +21 | 6 |
| Hungary | 3 | 2 | 0 | 1 | 31 | 29 | +2 | 4 |
| Australia | 3 | 1 | 0 | 2 | 27 | 28 | -1 | 2 |
| Italy | 3 | 0 | 0 | 3 | 21 | 43 | -22 | 0 |

| July 1, 2009; 10:00 | Game 1 | China | 11–8 | Hungary | SRC Banjica; Referees: Rakovič (SRB), Orikasa (JPN) |
| July 1, 2009; 10:00 | Game 1 | Score by quarters: 3-2, 2-1, 3-2, 3-3 | | | SRC Banjica; Referees: Rakovič (SRB), Orikasa (JPN) |
| July 1, 2009; 10:00 | Game 1 | Sun Y-J, Sun Y-T 3 | Goals | Bujka 3 | SRC Banjica; Referees: Rakovič (SRB), Orikasa (JPN) |

| July 1, 2009; 12:40 | Game 3 | Australia | 11–9 | Italy | SRC Banjica; Referees: Deslières (CAN), Voevodin (RUS) |
| July 1, 2009; 12:40 | Game 3 | Score by quarters: 2-2, 2-3, 2-1, 5-3 | | | SRC Banjica; Referees: Deslières (CAN), Voevodin (RUS) |
| July 1, 2009; 12:40 | Game 3 | Webster 5 | Goals | Motta 4 | SRC Banjica; Referees: Deslières (CAN), Voevodin (RUS) |

| July 3, 2009; 10:00 | Game 5 | China | 20–4 | Italy | SRC Banjica; Referees: Michalak (POL), Mackay (CAN) |
| July 3, 2009; 10:00 | Game 5 | Score by quarters: 6-1, 5-1, 5-1, 4-1 | | | SRC Banjica; Referees: Michalak (POL), Mackay (CAN) |
| July 3, 2009; 10:00 | Game 5 | Sun Y-J 5 | Goals | Motta 2 | SRC Banjica; Referees: Michalak (POL), Mackay (CAN) |

| July 3, 2009; 15:00 | Game 7 | Australia | 10–11 | Hungary | SRC Banjica; Referees: Makihashi (JPN), Mejia (MEX) |
| July 3, 2009; 15:00 | Game 7 | Score by quarters: 2-3, 1-5, 4-1, 3-2 | | | SRC Banjica; Referees: Makihashi (JPN), Mejia (MEX) |
| July 3, 2009; 15:00 | Game 7 | Webster 5 | Goals | Gyore 3 | SRC Banjica; Referees: Makihashi (JPN), Mejia (MEX) |

| July 5, 2009; 11:20 | Game 10 | Hungary | 12–8 | Italy | SRC Banjica; Referees: Stefanović (SRB), Orikasa (JPN) |
| July 5, 2009; 11:20 | Game 10 | Score by quarters: 3-4, 3-1, 5-0, 1-3 | | | SRC Banjica; Referees: Stefanović (SRB), Orikasa (JPN) |
| July 5, 2009; 11:20 | Game 10 | Bujka 4 | Goals | Motta, Lapi, Dalorto 2 | SRC Banjica; Referees: Stefanović (SRB), Orikasa (JPN) |

| July 5, 2009; 16:20 | Game 12 | China | 8–6 | Australia | SRC Banjica; Referees: Krapivin (RUS), Brala (CRO) |
| July 5, 2009; 16:20 | Game 12 | Score by quarters: 2-1, 1-2, 3-2, 2-1 | | | SRC Banjica; Referees: Krapivin (RUS), Brala (CRO) |
| July 5, 2009; 16:20 | Game 12 | Gao, Sun 2 | Goals | Gofers 3 | SRC Banjica; Referees: Krapivin (RUS), Brala (CRO) |

== Quarterfinals ==
| July 7, 2009; 15:00 | Game 14 | Serbia | 5–13 | Hungary | SRC Banjica; Referees: Deslières (CAN), Johnson (AUS) |
| July 7, 2009; 15:00 | Game 14 | Score by quarters: 2-5, 2-4, 0-1, 1-3 | | | SRC Banjica; Referees: Deslières (CAN), Johnson (AUS) |
| July 7, 2009; 15:00 | Game 14 | Ivkovic 2 | Goals | Bujka 4 | SRC Banjica; Referees: Deslières (CAN), Johnson (AUS) |

| July 7, 2009; 16:20 | Game 15 | Canada | 10–8 | Australia | SRC Banjica; Referees: Rakovič (SRB), Taccini (ITA) |
| July 7, 2009; 16:20 | Game 15 | Score by quarters: 4-4, 2-1, 2-2, 2-1 | | | SRC Banjica; Referees: Rakovič (SRB), Taccini (ITA) |
| July 7, 2009; 16:20 | Game 15 | Majuri, Eggens 3 | Goals | Webster 6 | SRC Banjica; Referees: Rakovič (SRB), Taccini (ITA) |

== Semifinals ==
| July 9, 2009; 17:00 | Report | Russia | 9–11 | Hungary | SRC Banjica; Referees: Taccini (ITA), Kouretas (GRE) |
| July 9, 2009; 17:00 | Report | Score by quarters: 2-2, 4-3, 1-4, 2-2 | | | SRC Banjica; Referees: Taccini (ITA), Kouretas (GRE) |
| July 9, 2009; 17:00 | Report | Antonova, Alexandrova, Kalyagina 2 | Goals | Bujka 5 | SRC Banjica; Referees: Taccini (ITA), Kouretas (GRE) |

| July 9, 2009; 18:20 | Report | China | 16–7 | Canada | SRC Banjica; Referees: Rakovič (SRB), Redding (USA) |
| July 9, 2009; 18:20 | Report | Score by quarters: 6-1, 6-1, 2-2, 2-3 | | | SRC Banjica; Referees: Rakovič (SRB), Redding (USA) |
| July 9, 2009; 18:20 | Report | Gao 5 | Goals | Majuri, Valin, Kaukinen 2 | SRC Banjica; Referees: Rakovič (SRB), Redding (USA) |

== Finals ==
=== Final 7-8 places ===
| July 7, 2009; 10:00 | Game 13 | Japan | 10–11 | Italy | SRC Banjica; Referees: He (CHN), Michalak (POL) |
| July 7, 2009; 10:00 | Game 13 | Score by quarters: 3-3, 1-3, 4-1, 2-4 | | | SRC Banjica; Referees: He (CHN), Michalak (POL) |
| July 7, 2009; 10:00 | Game 13 | Konaka 4 | Goals | Motta 5 | SRC Banjica; Referees: He (CHN), Michalak (POL) |

=== Final 5-6 places ===
| July 9, 2009; 10:00 | Game 16 | Serbia | 7–13 | Australia | SRC Banjica; Referees: Deslières (CAN), Petik (HUN) |
| July 9, 2009; 10:00 | Game 16 | Score by quarters: 0-3, 3-2, 3-4, 1-4 | | | SRC Banjica; Referees: Deslières (CAN), Petik (HUN) |
| July 9, 2009; 10:00 | Game 16 | Ivkovic 2 | Goals | Whitehorne, Gofers 3 | SRC Banjica; Referees: Deslières (CAN), Petik (HUN) |

== Bronze medal match ==
| July 11, 2009; 16:30 | Game 19 | Russia | 10–8 | Canada | SRC Banjica; Referees: Rakovič (SRB), Johnson (AUS) |
| July 11, 2009; 16:30 | Game 19 | Score by quarters: 2-1, 5-1, 1-4, 2-2 | | | SRC Banjica; Referees: Rakovič (SRB), Johnson (AUS) |
| July 11, 2009; 16:30 | Game 19 | Karpovich 3 | Goals | Valin 3 | SRC Banjica; Referees: Rakovič (SRB), Johnson (AUS) |

== Final ==
| July 11, 2009; 18:30 | Game 20 | Hungary | 8–12 | China | SRC Banjica; Referees: Deslières (CAN), Taccini (ITA) |
| July 11, 2009; 18:30 | Game 20 | Score by quarters: 1-2, 1-5, 4-2, 2-3 | | | SRC Banjica; Referees: Deslières (CAN), Taccini (ITA) |
| July 11, 2009; 18:30 | Game 20 | Bujka, Kiss 2 | Goals | Gao 4 | SRC Banjica; Referees: Deslières (CAN), Taccini (ITA) |

== Final standings ==
| Place | Team |
|---|---|
| 1st place, gold medalist(s) | China |
| 2nd place, silver medalist(s) | Hungary |
| 3rd place, bronze medalist(s) | Russia |
| 4 | Canada |
| 5 | Australia |
| 6 | Serbia |
| 7 | Italy |
| 8 | Japan |
