= Water polo at the 2016 Summer Olympics =

Water polo at the Games of the XXXI Olympiad

Tournament details
- Host country: Brazil
- City: Rio de Janeiro
- Venue(s): Maria Lenk Aquatics Centre, Olympic Aquatics Stadium
- Dates: 6–20 August 2016
- Events: 2 (men's, women's)
- Teams: 12 (men's), 8 (women's) (from 4 confederations)
- Competitors: 154 men, 104 women

Final positions
- Champions: Serbia (men); United States (women)
- Runners-up: Croatia (men); Italy (women)
- Third place: Italy (men); Russia (women)
- Fourth place: Montenegro (men); Hungary (women)

Tournament statistics (men, women)
- Matches: 66
- Goals scored: 1,139 (17.26 per match)
- Multiple appearances: 5-time Olympian(s): 2 players 4-time Olympian(s): 8 players
- Multiple medalists: 3-time medalist(s): 6 players
- MVPs: (Serbia) Filip Filipović (men's) (United States) Maggie Steffens (women's)

The water polo tournaments at the 2016 Summer Olympics in Rio de Janeiro took place from 6 to 20 August at the Maria Lenk Aquatics Centre in Barra da Tijuca. Twenty teams (twelve for men and eight for women) competed in the tournament. Games that ended in ties in elimination rounds were decided by shootouts, as overtime has been abolished since 2013.

== Qualification ==
=== Men's qualification ===
Qualification	Date	Host	Berths	Qualified
Host nation	2 October 2009	(Denmark) Copenhagen	1	Brazil
2015 FINA World League	23–28 June 2015	(Italy) Bergamo	1	Serbia
2015 Pan American Games	7–15 July 2015	(Canada) Toronto	1	United States
2015 FINA World Championships	27 July – 8 August 2015	(Russia) Kazan	2	Croatia
2015 FINA World Championships	27 July – 8 August 2015	(Russia) Kazan	2	Greece
Oceanian Continental Selection	19 October 2015	(Australia) Perth	1	Australia
2015 Asian Championship	16–20 December 2015	(China) Foshan	1	Japan
2016 European Championships	10–23 January 2016	(Serbia) Belgrade	1	Montenegro
World Qualification Tournament	3–10 April 2016	(Italy) Trieste	4	Hungary
World Qualification Tournament	3–10 April 2016	(Italy) Trieste	4	Italy
World Qualification Tournament	3–10 April 2016	(Italy) Trieste	4	Spain
World Qualification Tournament	3–10 April 2016	(Italy) Trieste	4	France
Total			12	

=== Women's qualification ===
Qualification	Date	Host	Berths	Qualified
Host nation	2 October 2009	(Denmark) Copenhagen	1	Brazil
Oceanian Continental Selection	19 October 2015	(Australia) Perth	1	Australia
2015 Asian Championship	16–17 December 2015	(China) Foshan	1	China
2016 European Championships	10–22 January 2016	(Serbia) Belgrade	1	Hungary
World Qualification Tournament	21–28 March 2016	(Netherlands) Gouda	4	United States
World Qualification Tournament	21–28 March 2016	(Netherlands) Gouda	4	Italy
World Qualification Tournament	21–28 March 2016	(Netherlands) Gouda	4	Russia
World Qualification Tournament	21–28 March 2016	(Netherlands) Gouda	4	Spain
Total			8	

== Competition schedule ==
G	Group stage	QF	Quarter-finals	SF	Semi-finals	B	Bronze medal match	F	Final

Date Event	Sat 6	Sun 7	Mon 8	Tue 9	Wed 10	Thu 11	Fri 12	Sat 13	Sun 14	Mon 15	Tue 16	Wed 17	Thu 18	Fri 19		Sat 20	
Men	G		G		G		G		G		QF		SF			B	F
Women				G		G		G		QF		SF		B	F		

== Men's competition ==
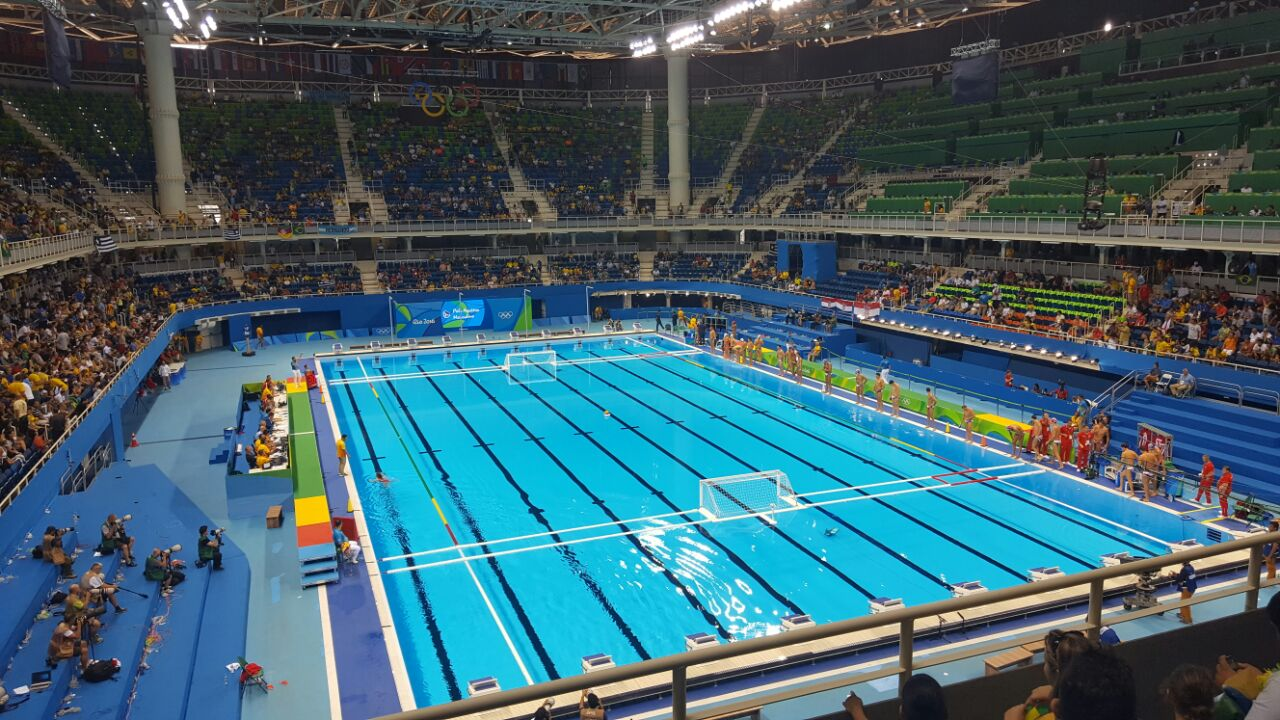
Inside 2016 Olympics Water polo arena

The competition consisted of two stages; a group stage followed by a knockout stage.

=== Group stage ===
The teams were divided into two groups of six countries, playing every team in their group once. Two points were awarded for a victory, one point for a draw. The top four teams per group qualified for the quarterfinals.

==== Group A ====
Pos	Team	Pld	W	D	L	GF	GA	GD	Pts	Qualification
1	Hungary	5	2	3	0	57	43	+14	7	Quarter-finals
2	Greece	5	2	2	1	41	40	+1	6	Quarter-finals
3	Brazil (H)	5	3	0	2	40	39	+1	6	Quarter-finals
4	Serbia	5	2	2	1	49	44	+5	6	Quarter-finals
5	Australia	5	2	1	2	44	40	+4	5	
6	Japan	5	0	0	5	36	61	−25	0	

Source: Rio2016
Rules for classification: 1) Points; 2) Head-to-head points; 3) Head-to-head goal difference; 4) Head-to-head goals scored; 5) Goal difference.
(H) Hosts

==== Group B ====
Pos	Team	Pld	W	D	L	GF	GA	GD	Pts	Qualification
1	Spain	5	3	1	1	46	35	+11	7	Quarter-finals
2	Croatia	5	3	0	2	37	37	0	6	Quarter-finals
3	Italy	5	3	0	2	40	41	−1	6	Quarter-finals
4	Montenegro	5	2	1	2	36	32	+4	5	Quarter-finals
5	United States	5	2	0	3	35	35	0	4	
6	France	5	1	0	4	28	42	−14	2	

Source: Rio2016
Rules for classification: 1) Points; 2) Head-to-head points; 3) Head-to-head goal difference; 4) Head-to-head goals scored; 5) Goal difference.

=== Knockout stage ===
Quarter-finals
16 August
Hungary	9 (2)
Montenegro (pen.)	9 (4)
16 August
Brazil	6
Croatia	10
16 August
Greece	5
Italy	9
16 August
Serbia	10
Spain	7

Semi-finals
18 August
Montenegro	8
Croatia	12
18 August
Italy	8
Serbia	10

Gold medal
20 August
Croatia	7
Serbia	11
Bronze medal
20 August
Montenegro	10
Italy	12

== Women's competition ==
The competition consisted of two stages; a group stage followed by a knockout stage.

=== Group stage ===
The teams were divided into two groups of four countries, playing every team in their group once. Two points were awarded for a victory, one for a draw. All teams qualified for the quarterfinals.

==== Group A ====
Pos	Team	Pld	W	D	L	GF	GA	GD	Pts	Qualification
1	Italy	3	3	0	0	27	15	+12	6	Quarter-finals
2	Australia	3	2	0	1	31	15	+16	4	Quarter-finals
3	Russia	3	1	0	2	23	31	−8	2	Quarter-finals
4	Brazil (H)	3	0	0	3	13	33	−20	0	Quarter-finals

Source: Rio2016
Rules for classification: 1) Points; 2) Head-to-head points; 3) Head-to-head goal difference; 4) Head-to-head goals scored; 5) Goal difference.
(H) Hosts

==== Group B ====
Pos	Team	Pld	W	D	L	GF	GA	GD	Pts	Qualification
1	United States	3	3	0	0	34	14	+20	6	Quarter-finals
2	Spain	3	2	0	1	27	29	−2	4	Quarter-finals
3	Hungary	3	1	0	2	29	33	−4	2	Quarter-finals
4	China	3	0	0	3	23	37	−14	0	Quarter-finals

Source: Rio2016
Rules for classification: 1) Points; 2) Head-to-head points; 3) Head-to-head goal difference; 4) Head-to-head goals scored; 5) Goal difference.

=== Knockout stage ===
Quarterfinals
A1	Italy	12
B4	China	7
A3	Russia	12
B2	Spain	10
A2	Australia	11
B3	Hungary (PSO)	13
A4	Brazil	3
B1	United States	13

Semifinals
A3	Russia	9
A1	Italy	12
B3	Hungary	10
B1	United States	14

Gold medal match
United States	12
Italy	5
Bronze medal match
4	Hungary	18
Russia (PSO)	19

== Medal summary ==
=== Medal table ===
Rank	Nation	Gold	Silver	Bronze	Total
1	Serbia	1	0	0	1
1	United States	1	0	0	1
3	Italy	0	1	1	2
4	Croatia	0	1	0	1
5	Russia	0	0	1	1
Totals (5 entries)		2	2	2	6

=== Medalists ===
Event	Gold	Silver	Bronze
Men	Serbia; Gojko Pijetlović; Dušan Mandić; Živko Gocić; Sava Ranđelović; Miloš Ćuk; Duško Pijetlović; Slobodan Nikić; Milan Aleksić; Nikola Jakšić; Filip Filipović; Andrija Prlainović; Stefan Mitrović; Branislav Mitrović	Croatia; Josip Pavić; Damir Burić; Antonio Petković; Luka Lončar; Maro Joković; Luka Bukić; Xavier García; Andro Bušlje; Sandro Sukno; Ivan Krapić; Anđelo Šetka; Marko Macan; Marko Bijač	Italy; Stefano Tempesti; Francesco Di Fulvio; Niccolò Gitto; Pietro Figlioli; Alessandro Velotto; Michaël Bodegas; Andrea Fondelli; Valentino Gallo; Christian Presciutti; Nicholas Presciutti; Matteo Aicardi; Alessandro Nora; Marco Del Lungo
Women	United States; Samantha Hill; Madeline Musselmann; Melissa Seidemann; Rachel Fattal; Aria Fischer; Maggie Steffens; Courtney Mathewson; Kiley Neushul; Caroline Clark; Kaleigh Gilchrist; Makenzie Fischer; Kami Craig; Ashleigh Johnson	Italy; Giulia Gorlero; Chiara Tabani; Arianna Garibotti; Elisa Queirolo; Federica Radicchi; Rosaria Aiello; Tania Di Mario; Roberta Bianconi; Giulia Enrica Emmolo; Francesca Pomeri; Aleksandra Cotti; Teresa Frassinetti; Laura Teani	Russia; Anna Ustyukhina; Maria Borisova; Ekaterina Prokofyeva; Elvina Karimova; Nadezhda Fedotova; Olga Belova; Ekaterina Lisunova; Anastasia Simanovich; Anna Timofeeva; Evgenia Soboleva; Evgeniya Ivanova; Anna Grineva; Anna Karnaukh

== See also ==
- Water polo at the 2014 Asian Games
- Water polo at the 2015 European Games
- Water polo at the 2015 Pan American Games

== Sources ==
- PDF documents in the Olympic World Library:
  - Official Results Book – 2016 Olympic Games – Water Polo (archive)
- Water polo on the Olympedia website
  - Water polo at the 2016 Summer Olympics (men's tournament, women's tournament)
- Water polo on the Sports Reference website
  - Water polo at the 2016 Summer Games (men's tournament, women's tournament) (archived)
