= Water polo at the 2016 Summer Olympics – Women's qualification =

2016 Women's Water Polo Olympic Games Qualification Tournament

Tournament details
- Host country: Netherlands
- Venue(s): 1 (in 1 host city)
- Dates: 21–28 March
- Teams: 12 (from 5 confederations)

Final positions
- Champions: United States
- Runners-up: Italy
- Third place: Russia
- Fourth place: Spain

Tournament statistics
- Matches played: 42
- Goals scored: 762 (18.14 per match)

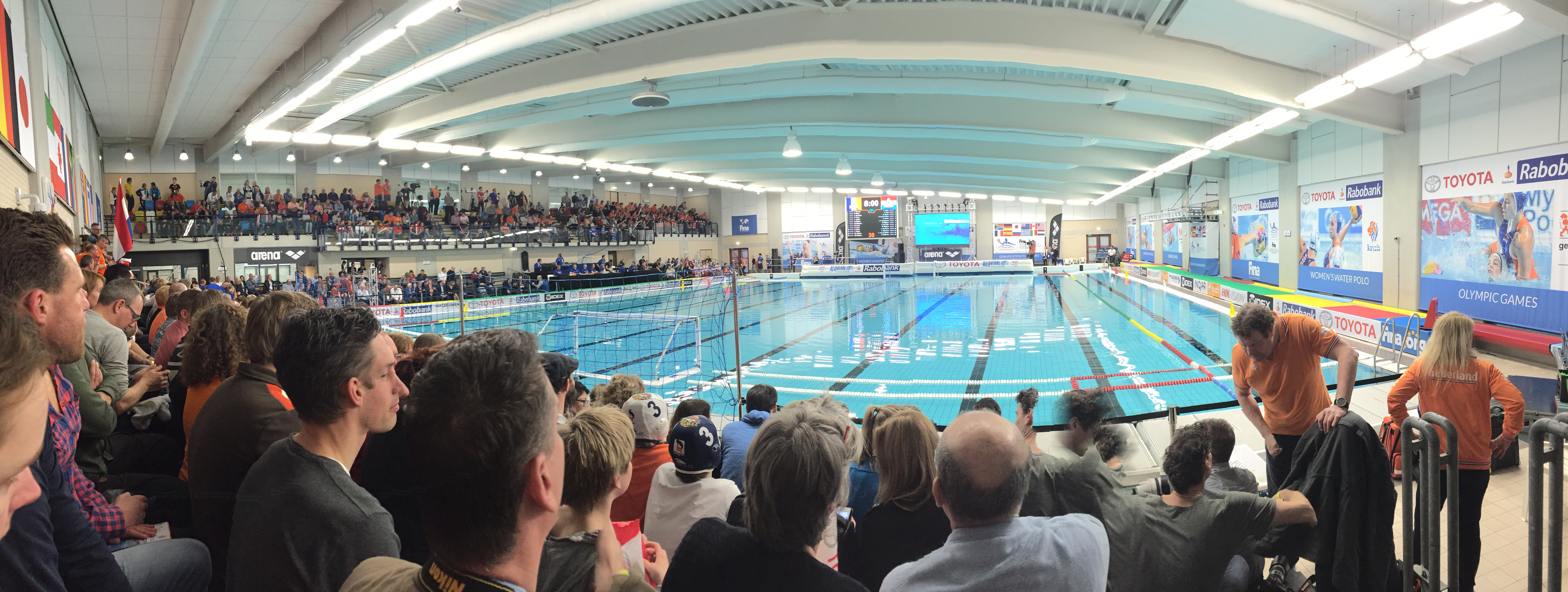
Panoramic view of the Groenhovenbad

The 2016 Women's Water Polo Olympic Qualification Tournament was held at the Groenhovenbad in Gouda, Netherlands, from 21 to 28 March 2016. The top four teams advanced to the Olympics. The mascot of the event was an orange lion in blue clothes called Swimba.

== Participants ==
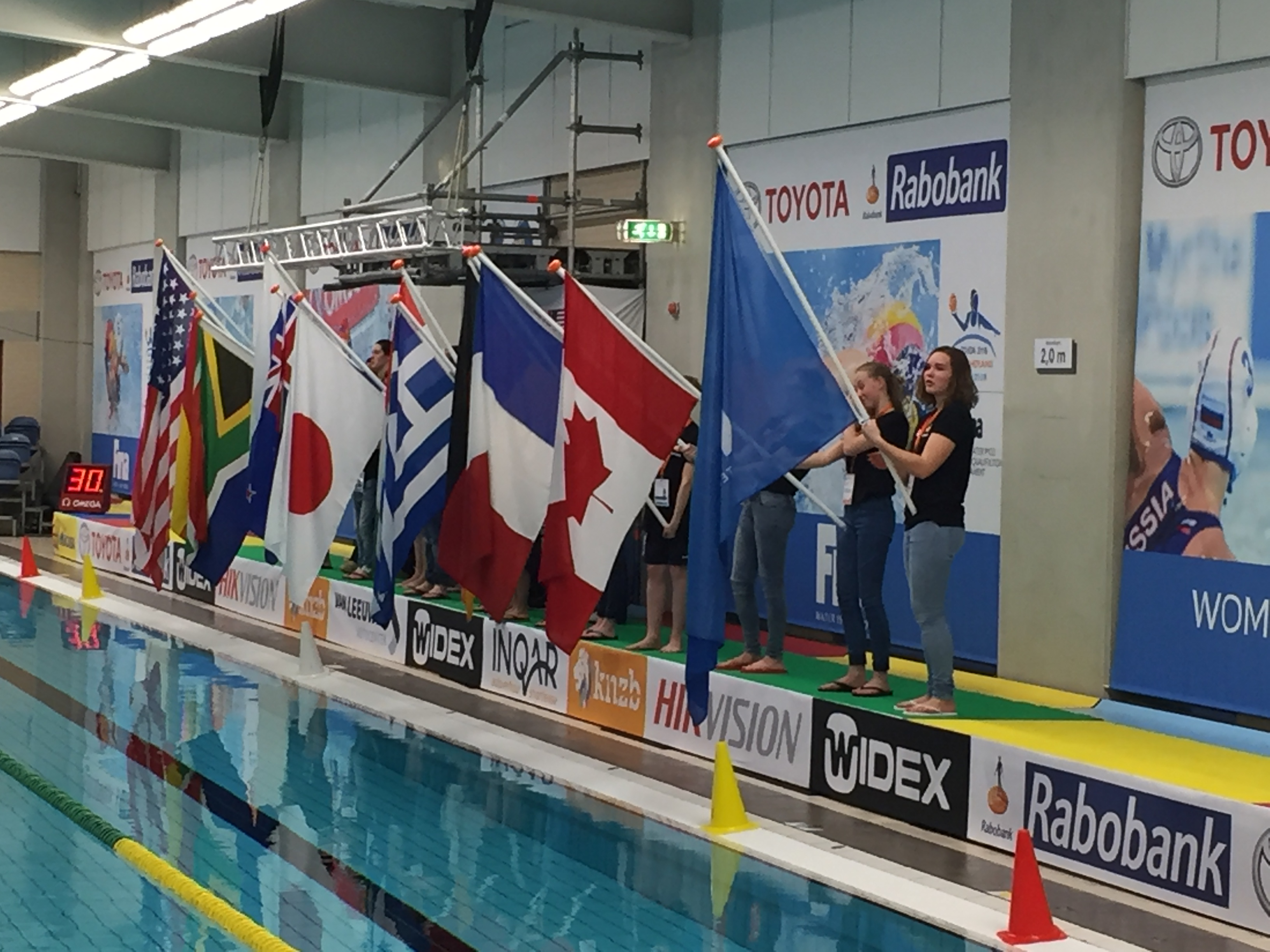
Flags of participating nation during the opening ceremony

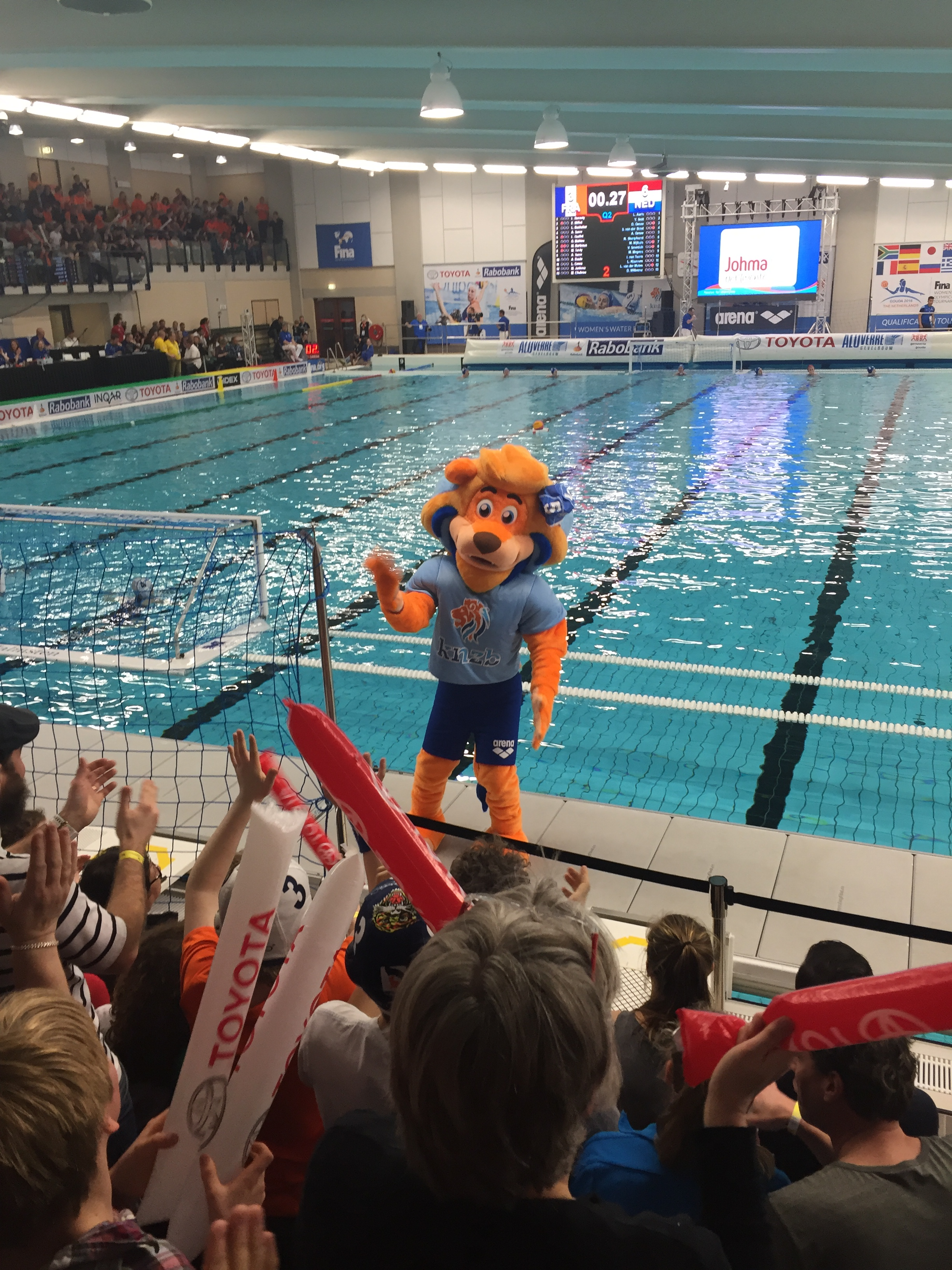
Swimba, the mascot of the event

There were 12 places originally allocated to continental associations in the tournament not already directly qualified to the Olympics – 7 from Europe, 2 from the Americas, 1 from Asia, 1 from Africa, and 1 from Oceania.

Continent	How qualified
Europe	
Netherlands	Host country
Italy	2016 European Championship bronze medalists
Spain	2016 European Championship 4th place
Greece	2016 European Championship 5th place
Russia	2016 European Championship 6th place
France	2016 European Championship 7th place
Germany	2016 European Championship 8th place
Americas	
United States	2015 Pan American Games gold medalists
Canada	2015 Pan American Games silver medalists
Asia	
Japan	2015 Asian Championship silver medalists
Africa	
South Africa	African Continental Selection
Oceania	
New Zealand	

== Squads ==
Canada	France	Germany	Greece
1: Jessica Gaudreault; 2: Krystina Alogbo; 3: Katrina Monton; 4: Emma Wright; 5: Monika Eggens; 6: Kelly McKee; 7: Joëlle Békhazi; 8: Axelle Crevier; 9: Carmen Eggens; 10: Christine Robinson; 11: Anna Yelizarova; 12: Dominique Perreault; 13: Nicola Colterjohn; Coach: Justin Oliveira	1: Lorene Derenty; 2: Estelle Millot; 3: Lea Bachelier; 4: Aurore Sacre; 5: Louise Guillet; 6: Geraldine Mahieu; 7: Marie Barbieux; 8: Marion Tardy; 9: Adeline Sacre; 10: Audrey Daule; 11: Lucie Cesca; 12: Michaela Jašková; 13: Morgane Chabrier; Coach: Filippos Sakellis	1: Felicitas Saurusajtis; 2: Belen Vosseberg; 3: Nadja Kreis; 4: Bianca Seyfert; 5: Claudia Blomenkamp; 6: Sina van der Bosch; 7: Anja Seyfert; 8: Jamie Verebelyi; 9: Jenny Stiefel; 10: Nadine Hartwig; 11: Carmen Gelse; 12: Anika Ebell; 13: Lotte Hurrelmann; Coach: Milos Sekulic	1: Eleni Kouvdou; 2: Christina Tsoukala; 3: Nikoleta Eleftheriadou; 4: Vasiliki Diamantopoulou; 5: Margarita Plevritou; 6: Alkisti Avramidou; 7: Alexandra Asimaki; 8: Antigoni Roumpesi; 9: Christina Kotsia; 10: Triantafyllia Manolioudaki; 11: Eleftheria Plevritou; 12: Eleni Xenaki; 13: Chrysoula Diamantopoulou; Coach: Athanasios Kechagias
Italy	Japan	Netherlands	New Zealand
1 Giulia Gorlero; 2 Chiara Tabani; 3 Arianna Garibotti; 4 Elisa Queirolo; 5 Federica Radicchi; 6 Rosaria Aiello; 7 Tania di Mario; 8 Roberta Bianconi; 9 Giulia Emmolo; 10 Francesca Pomeri; 11 Aleksandra Cotti; 12 Teresa Frassinetti; 13 Laura Teani; Coach Fabio Conti	1: Rikako Miura; 2: Chiaki Sakanoue; 3: Akari Inaba; 4: Shino Magariyama; 5: Moe Nakata; 6: Ayaka Takahashi; 7: Yumi Nakano; 8: Mitsuki Hashiguchi; 9: Kana Hosoya; 10: Tsubasa Mori; 11: Marina Tokumoto; 12: Kotori Suzuki; 13: Miyuu Aoki; Coach: Hideo Katoh	1: Laura Aarts; 2: Yasemin Smit; 3: Dagmar Genee; 4: Sabrina van der Sloot; 5: Amarens Genee; 6: Nomi Stomphorst; 7: Marloes Nijhuis; 8: Vivian Sevenich; 9: Maud Megens; 10: Isabella van Toorn; 11: Lieke Klaassen; 12: Leonie van der Molen; 13: Debby Willemsz; Coach: Arno Havenga	1: Jessica Milicich; 2: Nicole Lewis; 3: Kelly Mason; 4: Ricci Ferigo; 5: Simone Lewis; 6: Annabel Harman; 7: Alexandra Boyd; 8: Caitlin Lopes Da Silva; 9: Emma Stoneman; 10: Ema Carevic; 11: Casie Bowry; 12: Liana Dance; 13: Antonia Young; Coach: Angela Winstanley-Smith
Spain	South Africa	Russia	United States
1: Laura Ester; 2: Marta Bach; 3: Anni Espar; 4: Beatriz Ortiz; 5: Matilde Ortiz; 6: Jennifer Pareja; 7: Paula Leitón; 8: María del Pilar Peña; 9: Judith Forca; 10: Roser Tarragó; 11: Maica García Godoy; 12: Laura López; 13: Patricia Herrera; Coach: Miguel Angel Oca	1 Rebecca Thomas; 2 Amber Penny; 3 Kieran Paley; 4 Emma Hardham; 5 Carly Wessels; 6 Christine Abrahams; 7 Amy Keevy; 8 Alex van der Walt; 9 Cara Stubbs; 10 Megan Parkes; 11 Amica Hallendorff; 12 Kelsey White; 13 Lauren Nixon; Coach Gareth Samuel	1: Anna Ustyukhina; 2: Ekaterina Lisunova; 3: Ekaterina Prokofyeva; 4: Elvina Karimova; 5: Evgeniia Soboleva; 6: Ekaterina Tankeeva; 7: Evgeniya Ivanova; 8: Anastasia Simanovich; 9: Anna Timofeeva; 10: Diana Antonova; 11: Anna Timofeeva; 12: Ksenia Ivanchishiha; 13: Anastasia Verkhoglyadova; Coach: Alexander Gaidukov	1: Samantha Hill; 2: Madeline Musselman; 3: Melissa Seidemann; 4: Rachel Fattal; 5: Caroline Clark; 6: Maggie Steffens; 7: Courtney Mathewson; 8: Kiley Neushul; 9: Aria Fischer; 10: Kaleigh Gilchrist; 11: Makenzie Fischer; 12: Kami Craig; 13: Ashleigh Johnson; Coach: Adam Krikorian

== Draw ==
The draw took place on 23 January 2016 in Belgrade, after the final of the 2016 European Championship.

== Preliminary round ==
All times are local (UTC+1).

=== Group A ===
Pos	Team	Pld	W	D	L	GF	GA	GD	Pts	Qualification
1	United States	5	5	0	0	80	22	+58	10	Advance to quarterfinals
2	Greece	5	4	0	1	60	40	+20	8	Advance to quarterfinals
3	Spain	5	3	0	2	72	36	+36	6	Advance to quarterfinals
4	Canada	5	2	0	3	49	44	+5	4	Advance to quarterfinals
5	Japan	5	1	0	4	37	74	−37	2	Eliminated
6	South Africa	5	0	0	5	13	95	−82	0	Eliminated

Source: FINA
Rules for classification: 1) points; 2) head-to-head points; 3) head-to-head goal difference; 4) head-to-head number of goals scored; 5) goal difference.

21 March 2016; 12:40	Report	Japan	1–18	United States	Groenhovenbad, Gouda; Referees: Natacha Florestano (BRA), Svetlana Dreval (RUS)
21 March 2016; 12:40	Report	Score by quarters: 0–6, 1–5, 0–2, 0–5			Groenhovenbad, Gouda; Referees: Natacha Florestano (BRA), Svetlana Dreval (RUS)
21 March 2016; 12:40	Report	Hashiguchi 1	Goals	Neushul 4	Groenhovenbad, Gouda; Referees: Natacha Florestano (BRA), Svetlana Dreval (RUS)

21 March 2016; 14:00	Report	South Africa	2–17	Canada	Groenhovenbad, Gouda; Referees: Marcela Mauss (GER), Erwin Schapers (NED)
21 March 2016; 14:00	Report	Score by quarters: 0–3, 1–6, 1–4, 0–4			Groenhovenbad, Gouda; Referees: Marcela Mauss (GER), Erwin Schapers (NED)
21 March 2016; 14:00	Report	Penney, Wessels 1	Goals	three players 4	Groenhovenbad, Gouda; Referees: Marcela Mauss (GER), Erwin Schapers (NED)

21 March 2016; 15:20	Report	Spain	11–14	Greece	Groenhovenbad, Gouda; Referees: Gabriella Várkonyi (HUN), Daniel Flahive (AUS)
21 March 2016; 15:20	Report	Score by quarters: 2–3, 2–4, 3–3, 4–4			Groenhovenbad, Gouda; Referees: Gabriella Várkonyi (HUN), Daniel Flahive (AUS)
21 March 2016; 15:20	Report	Forca 4	Goals	three players 3	Groenhovenbad, Gouda; Referees: Gabriella Várkonyi (HUN), Daniel Flahive (AUS)

22 March 2016; 15:20	Report	United States	14–7	Canada	Groenhovenbad, Gouda; Referees: Adrian Alexandrescu (ROU), Jaume Teixido (ESP)
22 March 2016; 15:20	Report	Score by quarters: 5–2, 2–1, 3–2, 4–2			Groenhovenbad, Gouda; Referees: Adrian Alexandrescu (ROU), Jaume Teixido (ESP)
22 March 2016; 15:20	Report	Musselman 3	Goals	Eggens 2	Groenhovenbad, Gouda; Referees: Adrian Alexandrescu (ROU), Jaume Teixido (ESP)

22 March 2016; 16:40	Report	Greece	16–2	South Africa	Groenhovenbad, Gouda; Referees: Benjamin Mercier (FRA), Erwin Schapers (NED)
22 March 2016; 16:40	Report	Score by quarters: 2–0, 5–2, 3–0, 5–0			Groenhovenbad, Gouda; Referees: Benjamin Mercier (FRA), Erwin Schapers (NED)
22 March 2016; 16:40	Report	Asimaki, Tsoukala 3	Goals	Keevy, Penney 1	Groenhovenbad, Gouda; Referees: Benjamin Mercier (FRA), Erwin Schapers (NED)

22 March 2016; 20:00	Report	Japan	6–23	Spain	Groenhovenbad, Gouda; Referees: Marcela Mauss (GER), John Waldow (NZL)
22 March 2016; 20:00	Report	Score by quarters: 1–6, 1–4, 2–6, 2–7			Groenhovenbad, Gouda; Referees: Marcela Mauss (GER), John Waldow (NZL)
22 March 2016; 20:00	Report	Magariyama, Yumi 2	Goals	Leitón 6	Groenhovenbad, Gouda; Referees: Marcela Mauss (GER), John Waldow (NZL)

23 March 2016; 12:40	Report	Canada	4–11	Greece	Groenhovenbad, Gouda; Referees: Adrian Alexandrescu (ROU), Daniel Flahive (AUS)
23 March 2016; 12:40	Report	Score by quarters: 0–4, 0–2, 2–1, 2–4			Groenhovenbad, Gouda; Referees: Adrian Alexandrescu (ROU), Daniel Flahive (AUS)
23 March 2016; 12:40	Report	four players 1	Goals	Roumpesi 5	Groenhovenbad, Gouda; Referees: Adrian Alexandrescu (ROU), Daniel Flahive (AUS)

23 March 2016; 14:00	Report	Spain	6–8	United States	Groenhovenbad, Gouda; Referees: Alessandro Severo (ITA), Svetlana Dreval (RUS)
23 March 2016; 14:00	Report	Score by quarters: 2–2, 1–2, 1–2, 2–2			Groenhovenbad, Gouda; Referees: Alessandro Severo (ITA), Svetlana Dreval (RUS)
23 March 2016; 14:00	Report	B. Ortiz 2	Goals	M. Fischer 4	Groenhovenbad, Gouda; Referees: Alessandro Severo (ITA), Svetlana Dreval (RUS)

23 March 2016; 15:20	Report	South Africa	6–15	Japan	Groenhovenbad, Gouda; Referees: John Waldow (NZL), Benjamin Mercier (FRA)
23 March 2016; 15:20	Report	Score by quarters: 3–4, 1–4, 1–5, 1–2			Groenhovenbad, Gouda; Referees: John Waldow (NZL), Benjamin Mercier (FRA)
23 March 2016; 15:20	Report	White 3	Goals	Yumi 4	Groenhovenbad, Gouda; Referees: John Waldow (NZL), Benjamin Mercier (FRA)

24 March 2016; 15:20	Report	United States	15–7	Greece	Groenhovenbad, Gouda; Referees: Adrian Alexandrescu (ROU), Alessandro Severo (ITA)
24 March 2016; 15:20	Report	Score by quarters: 6–2, 4–2, 1–1, 4–2			Groenhovenbad, Gouda; Referees: Adrian Alexandrescu (ROU), Alessandro Severo (ITA)
24 March 2016; 15:20	Report	Neushul 5	Goals	Manolioudaki 2	Groenhovenbad, Gouda; Referees: Adrian Alexandrescu (ROU), Alessandro Severo (ITA)

24 March 2016; 16:40	Report	Japan	7–15	Canada	Groenhovenbad, Gouda; Referees: Benjamin Mercier (FRA), John Waldow (NZL)
24 March 2016; 16:40	Report	Score by quarters: 2–1, 3–5, 0–5, 2–4			Groenhovenbad, Gouda; Referees: Benjamin Mercier (FRA), John Waldow (NZL)
24 March 2016; 16:40	Report	Akari, Hashiguchi 2	Goals	Eggens 5	Groenhovenbad, Gouda; Referees: Benjamin Mercier (FRA), John Waldow (NZL)

24 March 2016; 20:00	Report	Spain	22–2	South Africa	Groenhovenbad, Gouda; Referees: Svetlana Dreval (RUS), Yosuke Kajiwara (JPN)
24 March 2016; 20:00	Report	Score by quarters: 5–0, 6–0, 4–1, 7–1			Groenhovenbad, Gouda; Referees: Svetlana Dreval (RUS), Yosuke Kajiwara (JPN)
24 March 2016; 20:00	Report	Espar, Forca 5	Goals	White 2	Groenhovenbad, Gouda; Referees: Svetlana Dreval (RUS), Yosuke Kajiwara (JPN)

25 March 2016; 12:40	Report	South Africa	1–25	United States	Groenhovenbad, Gouda; Referees: Svetlana Dreval (RUS), John Waldow (NZL)
25 March 2016; 12:40	Report	Score by quarters: 0–7, 0–6, 0–5, 1–7			Groenhovenbad, Gouda; Referees: Svetlana Dreval (RUS), John Waldow (NZL)
25 March 2016; 12:40	Report	Hardham 1	Goals	three players 4	Groenhovenbad, Gouda; Referees: Svetlana Dreval (RUS), John Waldow (NZL)

25 March 2016; 14:00	Report	Canada	6–10	Spain	Groenhovenbad, Gouda; Referees: Daniel Flahive (AUS), Benjamin Mercier (FRA)
25 March 2016; 14:00	Report	Score by quarters: 3–2, 2–1, 0–4, 1–3			Groenhovenbad, Gouda; Referees: Daniel Flahive (AUS), Benjamin Mercier (FRA)
25 March 2016; 14:00	Report	Eggens 3	Goals	Espar, Forca 3	Groenhovenbad, Gouda; Referees: Daniel Flahive (AUS), Benjamin Mercier (FRA)

25 March 2016; 15:20	Report	Japan	8–12	Greece	Groenhovenbad, Gouda; Referees: Marcela Mauss (GER), Erwin Schapers (NED)
25 March 2016; 15:20	Report	Score by quarters: 2–3, 1–4, 2–3, 3–2			Groenhovenbad, Gouda; Referees: Marcela Mauss (GER), Erwin Schapers (NED)
25 March 2016; 15:20	Report	Yumi 4	Goals	Asimaki 5	Groenhovenbad, Gouda; Referees: Marcela Mauss (GER), Erwin Schapers (NED)

=== Group B ===
Pos	Team	Pld	W	D	L	GF	GA	GD	Pts	Qualification
1	Italy	5	4	1	0	56	18	+38	9	Advance to quarterfinals
2	Netherlands (H)	5	3	2	0	55	30	+25	8	Advance to quarterfinals
3	Russia	5	3	1	1	53	22	+31	7	Advance to quarterfinals
4	France	5	2	0	3	29	52	−23	4	Advance to quarterfinals
5	Germany	5	1	0	4	23	64	−41	2	Eliminated
6	New Zealand	5	0	0	5	25	55	−30	0	Eliminated

Source: FINA
Rules for classification: 1) points; 2) head-to-head points; 3) head-to-head goal difference; 4) head-to-head number of goals scored; 5) goal difference.
(H) Hosts

21 March 2016; 16:40	Report	New Zealand	2–15	Russia	Groenhovenbad, Gouda; Referees: Nikolaos Boudramis (GRE), Michael Baty (RSA)
21 March 2016; 16:40	Report	Score by quarters: 0–3, 1–5, 1–3, 0–4			Groenhovenbad, Gouda; Referees: Nikolaos Boudramis (GRE), Michael Baty (RSA)
21 March 2016; 16:40	Report	Lewis, Mason 1	Goals	Zubkova 3	Groenhovenbad, Gouda; Referees: Nikolaos Boudramis (GRE), Michael Baty (RSA)

21 March 2016; 18:30	Report	France	5–14	Netherlands	Groenhovenbad, Gouda; Referees: Adrian Alexandrescu (ROU), Steve Rotsart (USA)
21 March 2016; 18:30	Report	Score by quarters: 1–2, 2–4, 1–4, 1–4			Groenhovenbad, Gouda; Referees: Adrian Alexandrescu (ROU), Steve Rotsart (USA)
21 March 2016; 18:30	Report	Tardy 2	Goals	Van der Sloot 4	Groenhovenbad, Gouda; Referees: Adrian Alexandrescu (ROU), Steve Rotsart (USA)

21 March 2016; 20:00	Report	Italy	16–3	Germany	Groenhovenbad, Gouda; Referees: Jaume Teixido (ESP), Yosuke Kajiwara (JPN)
21 March 2016; 20:00	Report	Score by quarters: 4–0, 5–0, 4–2, 3–1			Groenhovenbad, Gouda; Referees: Jaume Teixido (ESP), Yosuke Kajiwara (JPN)
21 March 2016; 20:00	Report	Garibotti 3	Goals	three players 1	Groenhovenbad, Gouda; Referees: Jaume Teixido (ESP), Yosuke Kajiwara (JPN)

22 March 2016; 12:40	Report	Germany	8–5	New Zealand	Groenhovenbad, Gouda; Referees: Gabriella Várkonyi (HUN), Nikolaos Boudramis (GRE
22 March 2016; 12:40	Report	Score by quarters: 3–2, 2–1, 2–1, 1–1			Groenhovenbad, Gouda; Referees: Gabriella Várkonyi (HUN), Nikolaos Boudramis (GRE
22 March 2016; 12:40	Report	Blomenkamp, Seyfert 3	Goals	Lopes Da Silva 3	Groenhovenbad, Gouda; Referees: Gabriella Várkonyi (HUN), Nikolaos Boudramis (GRE

22 March 2016; 14:00	Report	France	2–14	Italy	Groenhovenbad, Gouda; Referees: Natacha Florestano (BRA), Daniel Flahive (AUS)
22 March 2016; 14:00	Report	Score by quarters: 1–4, 0–3, 1–4, 0–3			Groenhovenbad, Gouda; Referees: Natacha Florestano (BRA), Daniel Flahive (AUS)
22 March 2016; 14:00	Report	Bachelier, Jašková 1	Goals	Bianconi 3	Groenhovenbad, Gouda; Referees: Natacha Florestano (BRA), Daniel Flahive (AUS)

22 March 2016; 18:30	Report	Netherlands	8–8	Russia	Groenhovenbad, Gouda; Referees: Marie-Claude Deslières (CAN), Jaume Teixido (ESP)
22 March 2016; 18:30	Report	Score by quarters: 1–3, 3–1, 4–0, 0–4			Groenhovenbad, Gouda; Referees: Marie-Claude Deslières (CAN), Jaume Teixido (ESP)
22 March 2016; 18:30	Report	Megens, Nijhuis 2	Goals	Karimova 2	Groenhovenbad, Gouda; Referees: Marie-Claude Deslières (CAN), Jaume Teixido (ESP)

23 March 2016; 16:40	Report	Russia	18–4	Germany	Groenhovenbad, Gouda; Referees: Michael Baty (RSA), Yosuke Kajiwara (JPN)
23 March 2016; 16:40	Report	Score by quarters: 8–1, 2–0, 4–0, 4–3			Groenhovenbad, Gouda; Referees: Michael Baty (RSA), Yosuke Kajiwara (JPN)
23 March 2016; 16:40	Report	Ivanova 4	Goals	Blomenkamp 2	Groenhovenbad, Gouda; Referees: Michael Baty (RSA), Yosuke Kajiwara (JPN)

23 March 2016; 18:30	Report	Italy	8–8	Netherlands	Groenhovenbad, Gouda; Referees: Nikolaos Boudramis (GRE), Gabriella Várkonyi (HUN)
23 March 2016; 18:30	Report	Score by quarters: 1–3, 3–2, 2–1, 2–2			Groenhovenbad, Gouda; Referees: Nikolaos Boudramis (GRE), Gabriella Várkonyi (HUN)
23 March 2016; 18:30	Report	Di Mario, Queirolo 3	Goals	Van der Sloot 3	Groenhovenbad, Gouda; Referees: Nikolaos Boudramis (GRE), Gabriella Várkonyi (HUN)

23 March 2016; 20:00	Report	New Zealand	9–11	France	Groenhovenbad, Gouda; Referees: Natacha Florestano (BRA), Marie-Claude Deslières (CAN)
23 March 2016; 20:00	Report	Score by quarters: 1–4, 2–4, 4–2, 2–1			Groenhovenbad, Gouda; Referees: Natacha Florestano (BRA), Marie-Claude Deslières (CAN)
23 March 2016; 20:00	Report	four players 2	Goals	Bachelier 4	Groenhovenbad, Gouda; Referees: Natacha Florestano (BRA), Marie-Claude Deslières (CAN)

24 March 2016; 12:40	Report	France	2–10	Russia	Groenhovenbad, Gouda; Referees: Steve Rotsart (USA), Nikolaos Boudramis (GRE)
24 March 2016; 12:40	Report	Score by quarters: 2–3, 0–0, 0–5, 0–2			Groenhovenbad, Gouda; Referees: Steve Rotsart (USA), Nikolaos Boudramis (GRE)
24 March 2016; 12:40	Report	Bachelier, Guillet 1	Goals	four players 2	Groenhovenbad, Gouda; Referees: Steve Rotsart (USA), Nikolaos Boudramis (GRE)

24 March 2016; 14:00	Report	Italy	12–3	New Zealand	Groenhovenbad, Gouda; Referees: Michael Baty (RSA), Jaume Teixido (ESP)
24 March 2016; 14:00	Report	Score by quarters: 5–0, 4–2, 1–1, 2–0			Groenhovenbad, Gouda; Referees: Michael Baty (RSA), Jaume Teixido (ESP)
24 March 2016; 14:00	Report	Emmolo, Frassinetti 3	Goals	Harman 2	Groenhovenbad, Gouda; Referees: Michael Baty (RSA), Jaume Teixido (ESP)

24 March 2016; 18:30	Report	Netherlands	16–3	Germany	Groenhovenbad, Gouda; Referees: Natacha Florestano (BRA), Marie-Claude Deslières (CAN)
24 March 2016; 18:30	Report	Score by quarters: 3–0, 5–1, 4–2, 4–0			Groenhovenbad, Gouda; Referees: Natacha Florestano (BRA), Marie-Claude Deslières (CAN)
24 March 2016; 18:30	Report	three players 3	Goals	Blomenkamp 2	Groenhovenbad, Gouda; Referees: Natacha Florestano (BRA), Marie-Claude Deslières (CAN)

25 March 2016; 16:40	Report	Russia	2–6	Italy	Groenhovenbad, Gouda; Referees: Adrian Alexandrescu (ROU), Jaume Teixido (ESP)
25 March 2016; 16:40	Report	Score by quarters: 0–2, 1–2, 0–2, 1–0			Groenhovenbad, Gouda; Referees: Adrian Alexandrescu (ROU), Jaume Teixido (ESP)
25 March 2016; 16:40	Report	Ivanova, Karimova 1	Goals	Di Mario 2	Groenhovenbad, Gouda; Referees: Adrian Alexandrescu (ROU), Jaume Teixido (ESP)

25 March 2016; 18:30	Report	New Zealand	6–9	Netherlands	Groenhovenbad, Gouda; Referees: Gabriella Várkonyi (HUN), Yosuke Kajiwara (JPN)
25 March 2016; 18:30	Report	Score by quarters: 3–3, 1–1, 1–2, 1–3			Groenhovenbad, Gouda; Referees: Gabriella Várkonyi (HUN), Yosuke Kajiwara (JPN)
25 March 2016; 18:30	Report	Harman, Lopes Da Silva 2	Goals	Klaassen 2	Groenhovenbad, Gouda; Referees: Gabriella Várkonyi (HUN), Yosuke Kajiwara (JPN)

25 March 2016; 20:00	Report	France	9–5	Germany	Groenhovenbad, Gouda; Referees: Natacha Florestano (BRA), Steve Rotsart (USA)
25 March 2016; 20:00	Report	Score by quarters: 2–0, 2–1, 1–2, 4–2			Groenhovenbad, Gouda; Referees: Natacha Florestano (BRA), Steve Rotsart (USA)
25 March 2016; 20:00	Report	Jašková 3	Goals	five players 1	Groenhovenbad, Gouda; Referees: Natacha Florestano (BRA), Steve Rotsart (USA)

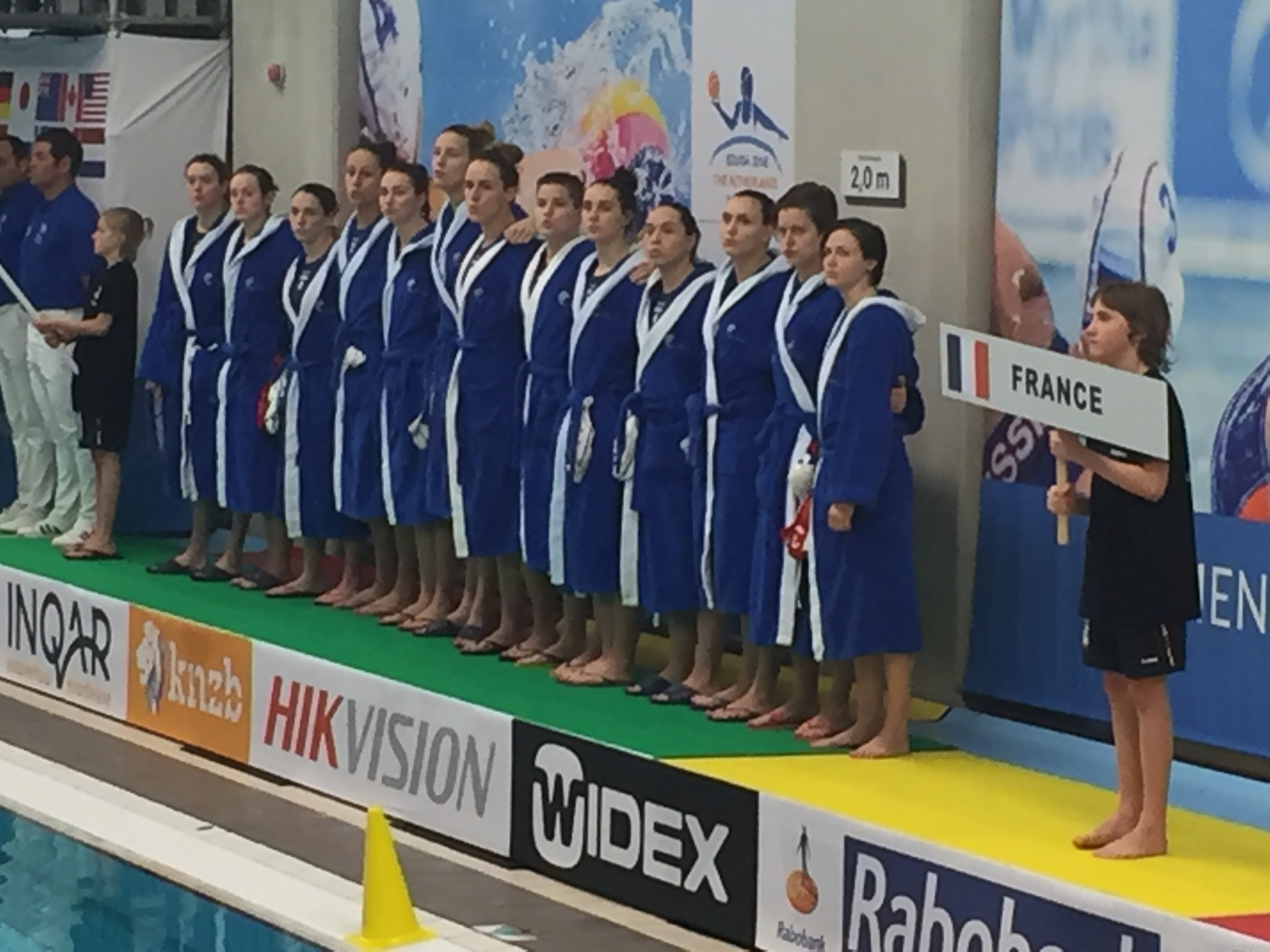
French team

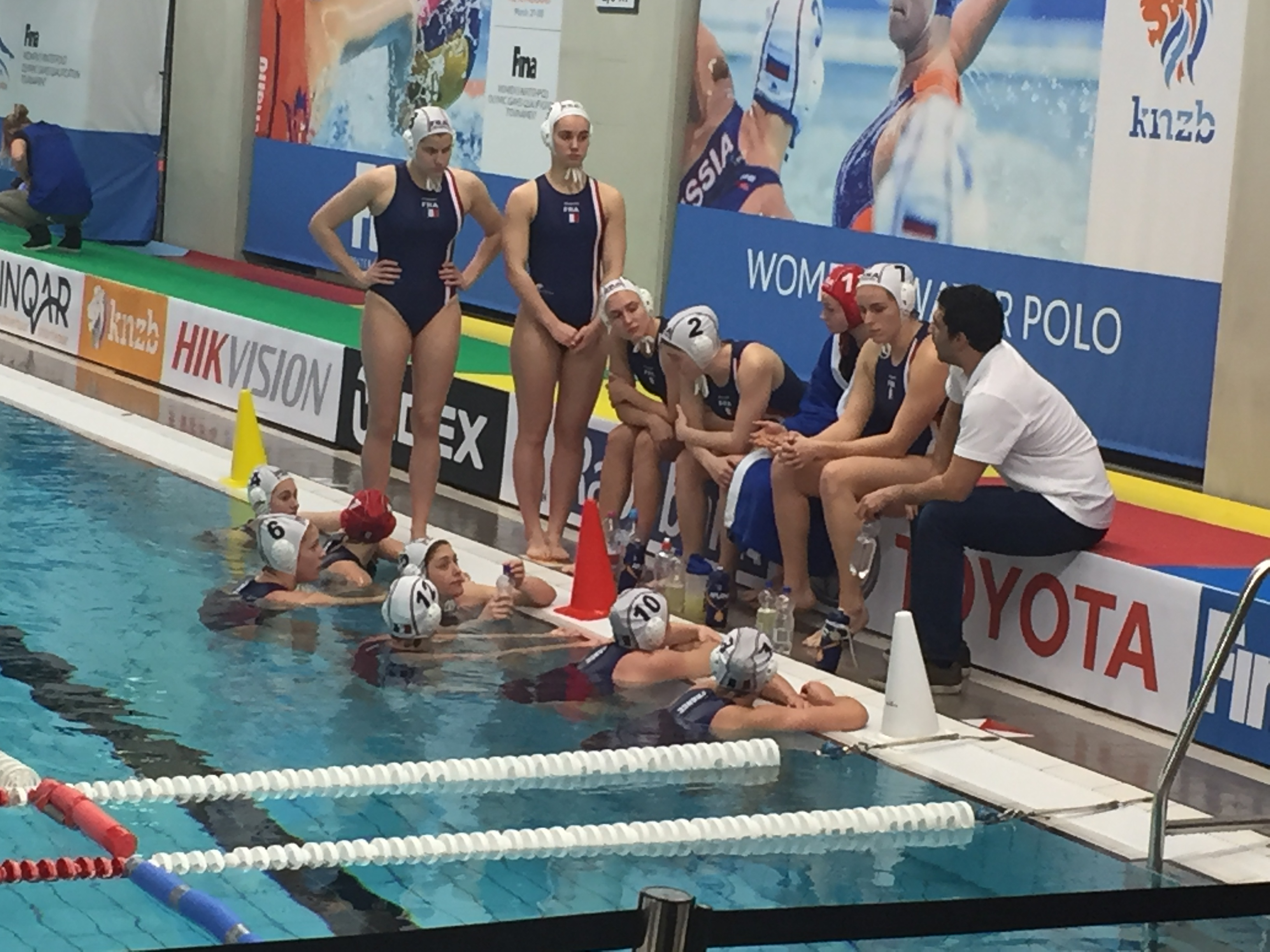
French team

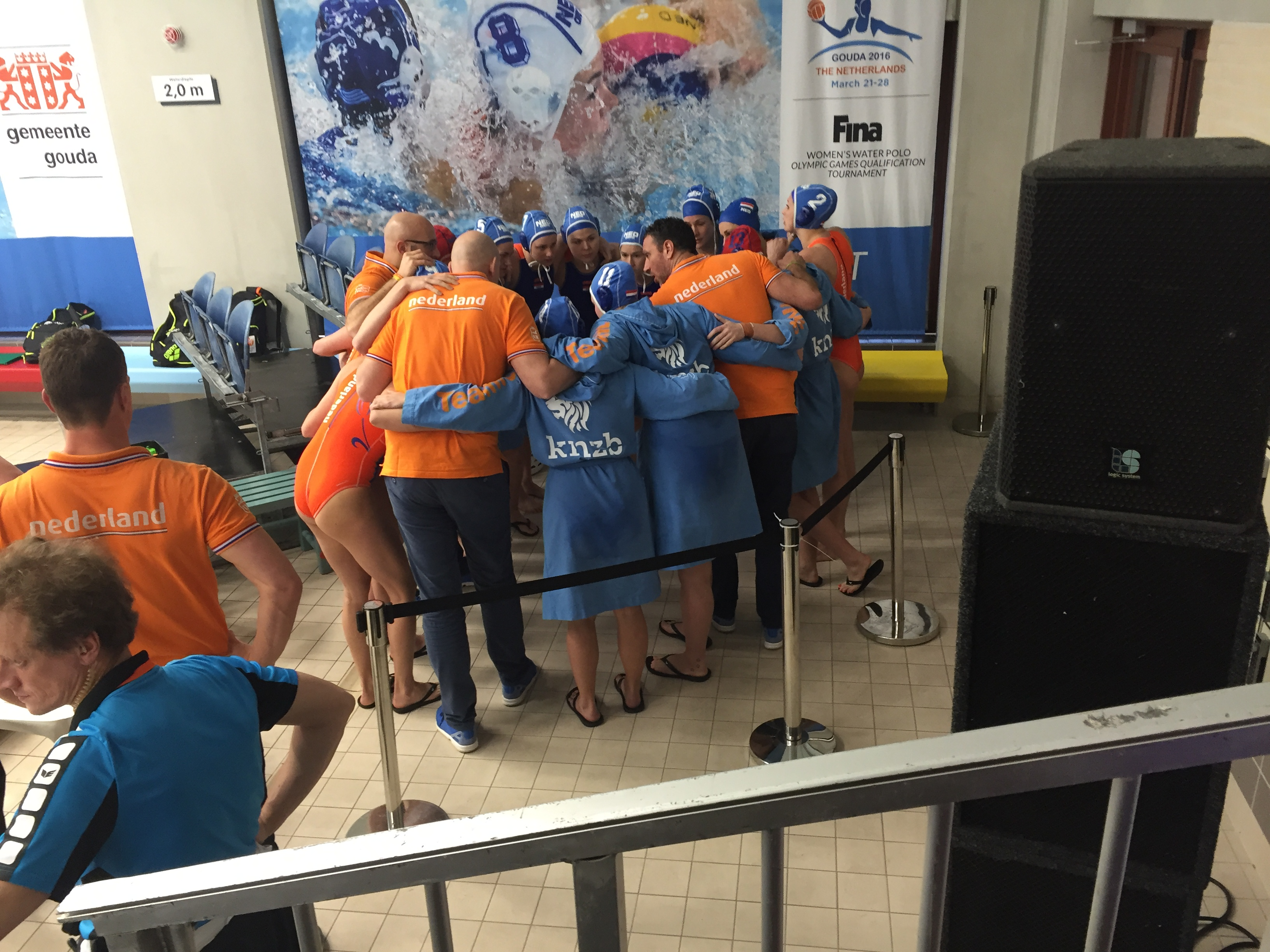
Dutch team

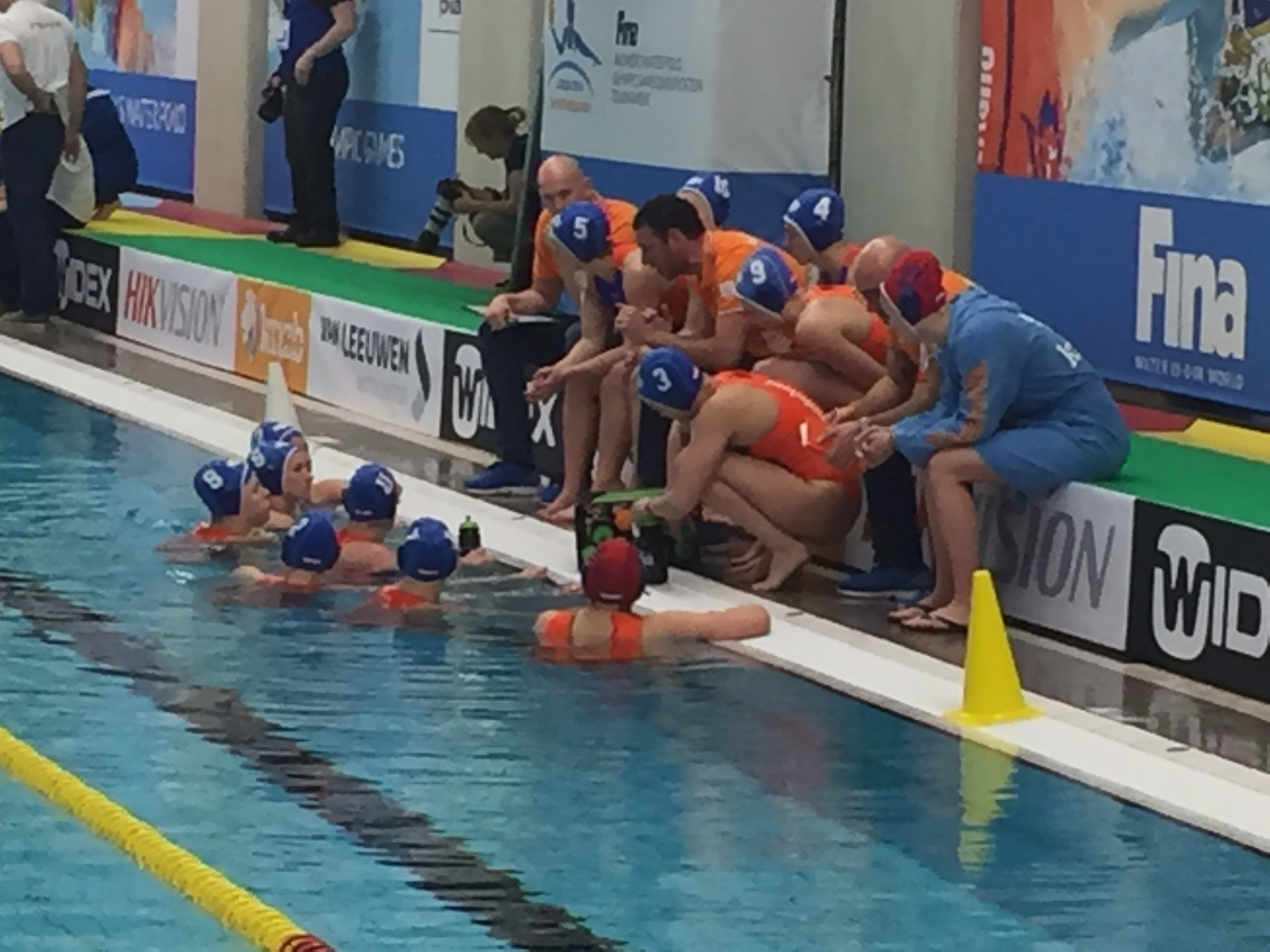
Dutch team

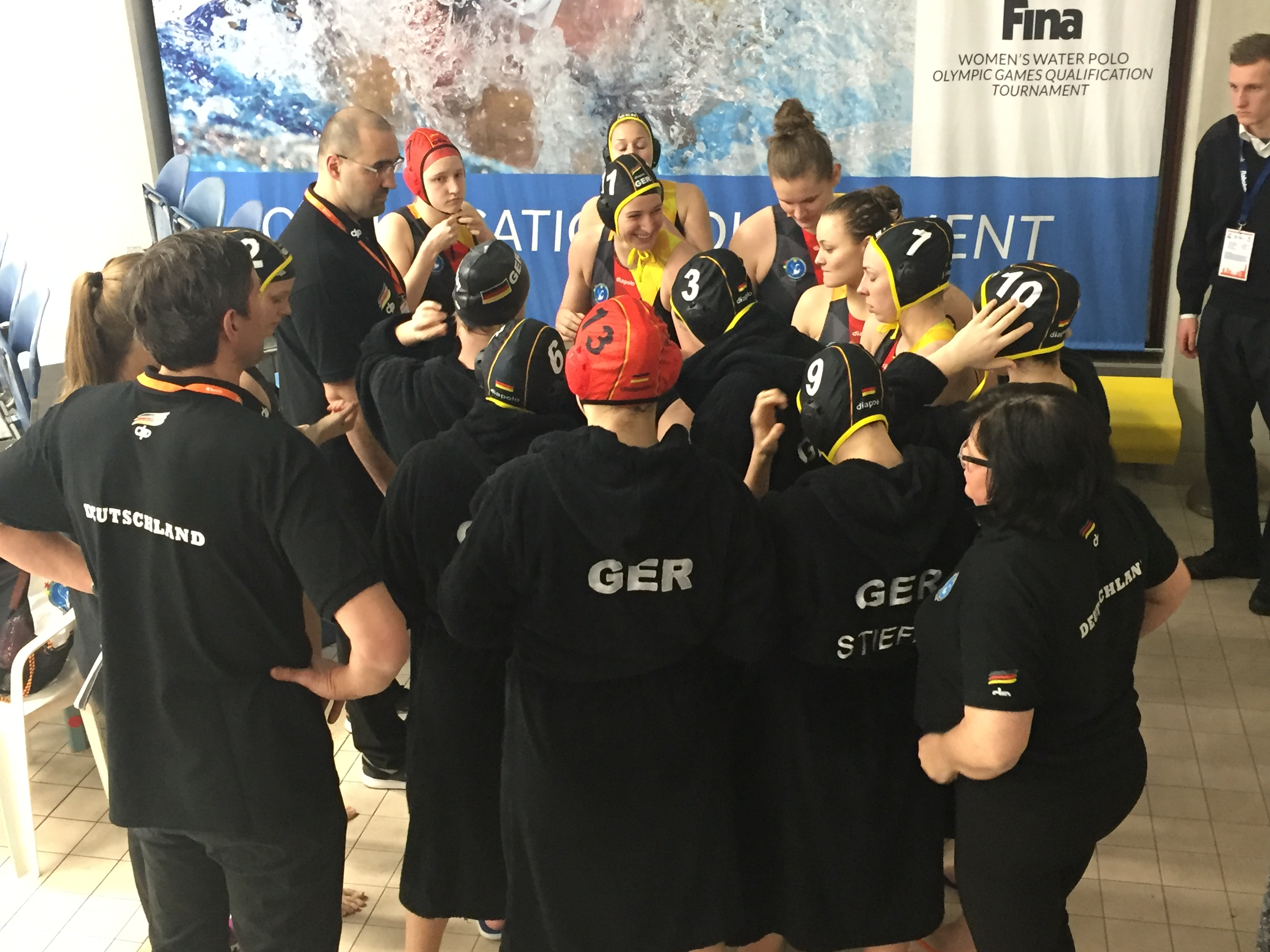
German team

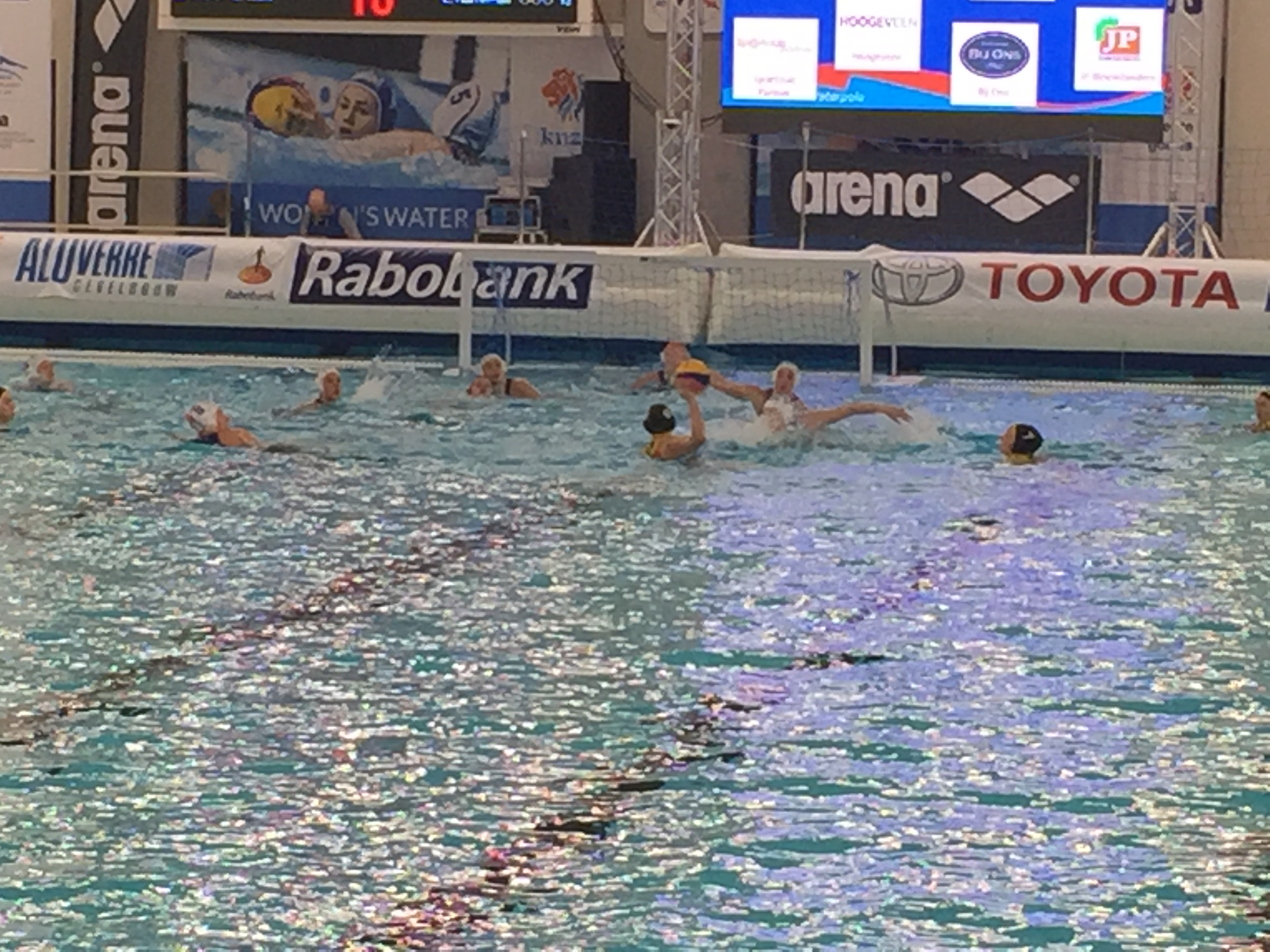
Italy vs. Germany

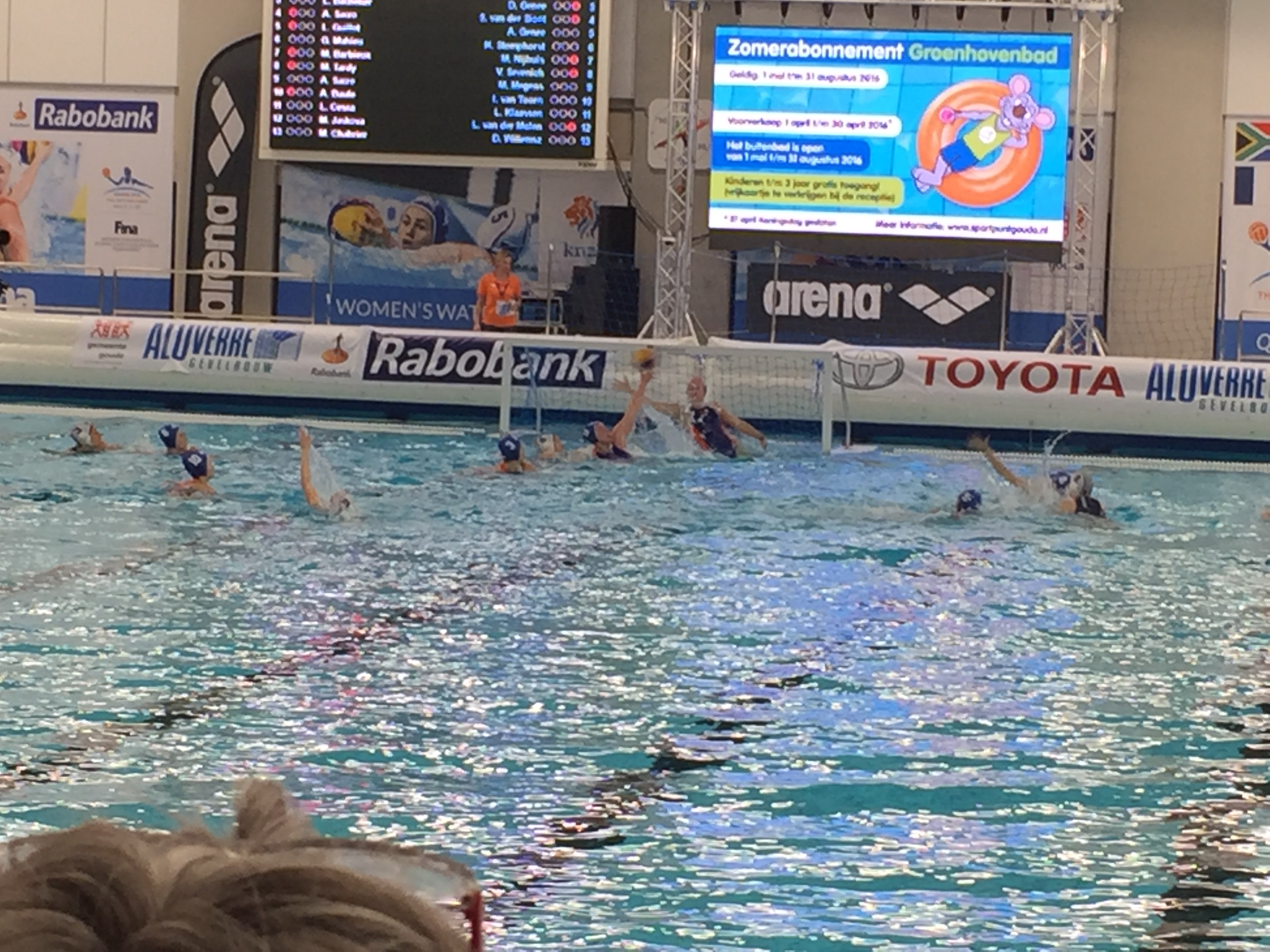
Netherlands vs. France

== Knockout stage ==
Times are local (UTC+1) for matches on 26 March, and (UTC+2) for matches on 27 and 28 March 2016.

=== Bracket ===
Quarterfinals
United States	19
France	0
Spain	10
Netherlands	7
Greece	12
Russia	13
Canada	7
Italy	8

Semifinals
United States	13
Spain	7
Russia	7
Italy	9

Final
United States	11
Italy	6
Third place
Spain	4
Russia	10

5th place bracket

Semifinals
France	1
Netherlands	16
Greece	12
Canada	10

Fifth place
Netherlands	9
Greece	7
Seventh place
France	6
Canada	11

=== Quarterfinals ===
The winners qualify for the 2016 Olympics.

26 March 2016; 12:00	Report	United States	19–0	France	Groenhovenbad, Gouda; Referees: Svetlana Dreval (RUS), Marie-Claude Deslières (CAN)
26 March 2016; 12:00	Report	Score by quarters: 5–0, 7–0, 3–0, 4–0			Groenhovenbad, Gouda; Referees: Svetlana Dreval (RUS), Marie-Claude Deslières (CAN)
26 March 2016; 12:00	Report	M. Fischer 6	Goals		Groenhovenbad, Gouda; Referees: Svetlana Dreval (RUS), Marie-Claude Deslières (CAN)

26 March 2016; 13:45	Report	Greece	12–13	Russia	Groenhovenbad, Gouda; Referees: Gabriella Várkonyi (HUN), Jaume Teixido (ESP)
26 March 2016; 13:45	Report	Score by quarters: 5–3, 1–2, 1–2, 3–3 PSO: 2–3			Groenhovenbad, Gouda; Referees: Gabriella Várkonyi (HUN), Jaume Teixido (ESP)
26 March 2016; 13:45	Report	Roumpesi 5	Goals	Ivanova, Simanovich 3	Groenhovenbad, Gouda; Referees: Gabriella Várkonyi (HUN), Jaume Teixido (ESP)

26 March 2016; 16:00	Report	Spain	10–7	Netherlands	Groenhovenbad, Gouda; Referees: Daniel Flahive (AUS), Alessandro Severo (ITA)
26 March 2016; 16:00	Report	Score by quarters: 4–1, 2–2, 2–2, 2–2			Groenhovenbad, Gouda; Referees: Daniel Flahive (AUS), Alessandro Severo (ITA)
26 March 2016; 16:00	Report	Forca 3	Goals	Smit, Van der Sloot 2	Groenhovenbad, Gouda; Referees: Daniel Flahive (AUS), Alessandro Severo (ITA)

26 March 2016; 17:45	Report	Canada	7–8	Italy	Groenhovenbad, Gouda; Referees: Natacha Florestano (BRA), Adrian Alexandrescu (ROU)
26 March 2016; 17:45	Report	Score by quarters: 2–4, 2–2, 1–2, 2–0			Groenhovenbad, Gouda; Referees: Natacha Florestano (BRA), Adrian Alexandrescu (ROU)
26 March 2016; 17:45	Report	three players 2	Goals	Garibotti 3	Groenhovenbad, Gouda; Referees: Natacha Florestano (BRA), Adrian Alexandrescu (ROU)

=== 5–8th place semifinals ===
27 March 2016; 12:00	Report	Greece	12–10	Canada	Groenhovenbad, Gouda; Referees: Svetlana Dreval (RUS), John Waldow (NZL)
27 March 2016; 12:00	Report	Score by quarters: 3–2, 4–3, 4–3, 1–2			Groenhovenbad, Gouda; Referees: Svetlana Dreval (RUS), John Waldow (NZL)
27 March 2016; 12:00	Report	Asimaki, Eleftheriadou 2	Goals	Crevier 3	Groenhovenbad, Gouda; Referees: Svetlana Dreval (RUS), John Waldow (NZL)

27 March 2016; 13:45	Report	France	1–16	Netherlands	Groenhovenbad, Gouda; Referees: Marcela Mauss (GER), Michael Baty (RSA)
27 March 2016; 13:45	Report	Score by quarters: 0–2, 0–2, 0–4, 1–8			Groenhovenbad, Gouda; Referees: Marcela Mauss (GER), Michael Baty (RSA)
27 March 2016; 13:45	Report	Guillet 1	Goals	Van der Sloot 4	Groenhovenbad, Gouda; Referees: Marcela Mauss (GER), Michael Baty (RSA)

=== Semifinals ===
27 March 2016; 16:00	Report	United States	13–7	Spain	Groenhovenbad, Gouda; Referees: Nikolaos Boudramis (GRE), Erwin Schapers (NED)
27 March 2016; 16:00	Report	Score by quarters: 5–3, 2–1, 2–1, 4–2			Groenhovenbad, Gouda; Referees: Nikolaos Boudramis (GRE), Erwin Schapers (NED)
27 March 2016; 16:00	Report	three players 3	Goals	García Godoy, Tarragó 3	Groenhovenbad, Gouda; Referees: Nikolaos Boudramis (GRE), Erwin Schapers (NED)

27 March 2016; 17:45	Report	Russia	7–9	Italy	Groenhovenbad, Gouda; Referees: Steve Rotsart (USA), Benjamin Mercier (FRA)
27 March 2016; 17:45	Report	Score by quarters: 1–2, 3–3, 0–3, 3–1			Groenhovenbad, Gouda; Referees: Steve Rotsart (USA), Benjamin Mercier (FRA)
27 March 2016; 17:45	Report	Karimova 2	Goals	Bianconi 2	Groenhovenbad, Gouda; Referees: Steve Rotsart (USA), Benjamin Mercier (FRA)

=== 7th place match ===
28 March 2016; 12:00	Report	France	6–11	Canada	Groenhovenbad, Gouda; Referees: Marcela Mauss (GER), Jaume Teixido (ESP)
28 March 2016; 12:00	Report	Score by quarters: 1–3, 1–2, 3–4, 1–2			Groenhovenbad, Gouda; Referees: Marcela Mauss (GER), Jaume Teixido (ESP)
28 March 2016; 12:00	Report	Guillet, Jašková 2	Goals	Robinson 3	Groenhovenbad, Gouda; Referees: Marcela Mauss (GER), Jaume Teixido (ESP)

=== 5th place match ===
28 March 2016; 13:45	Report	Netherlands	9–7	Greece	Groenhovenbad, Gouda; Referees: Marie-Claude Deslières (CAN), Steve Rotsart (USA)
28 March 2016; 13:45	Report	Score by quarters: 2–3, 3–2, 4–2, 0–0			Groenhovenbad, Gouda; Referees: Marie-Claude Deslières (CAN), Steve Rotsart (USA)
28 March 2016; 13:45	Report	Smit 3	Goals	three players 2	Groenhovenbad, Gouda; Referees: Marie-Claude Deslières (CAN), Steve Rotsart (USA)

=== 3rd place match ===
28 March 2016; 16:00	Report	Spain	4–10	Russia	Groenhovenbad, Gouda; Referees: Adrian Alexandrescu (ROU), Alessandro Severo (ITA)
28 March 2016; 16:00	Report	Score by quarters: 1–5, 2–2, 0–0, 1–3			Groenhovenbad, Gouda; Referees: Adrian Alexandrescu (ROU), Alessandro Severo (ITA)
28 March 2016; 16:00	Report	Forca 3	Goals	Ivanova 3	Groenhovenbad, Gouda; Referees: Adrian Alexandrescu (ROU), Alessandro Severo (ITA)

=== Final ===
28 March 2016; 17:45	Report	United States	11–6	Italy	Groenhovenbad, Gouda; Referees: Daniel Flahive (AUS), Erwin Schapers (NED)
28 March 2016; 17:45	Report	Score by quarters: 3–4, 2–1, 3–0, 3–1			Groenhovenbad, Gouda; Referees: Daniel Flahive (AUS), Erwin Schapers (NED)
28 March 2016; 17:45	Report	M. Fischer 3	Goals	Di Mario 2	Groenhovenbad, Gouda; Referees: Daniel Flahive (AUS), Erwin Schapers (NED)

== Final ranking ==
Qualified for the Summer Olympics

Rank	Team
Gold medal	United States
Silver medal	Italy
Bronze medal	Russia
4	Spain
5	Netherlands
6	Greece
7	Canada
8	France
9	Japan
10	Germany
11	New Zealand
12	South Africa

== See also ==
- 2016 Men's Water Polo Olympic Games Qualification Tournament
