= Water polo at the 2016 Summer Olympics – Women's tournament =

Women's water polo at the Games of the XXXI Olympiad

Tournament details
- Host country: Brazil
- City: Rio de Janeiro
- Venue(s): Maria Lenk Aquatics Centre, Olympic Aquatics Stadium
- Dates: 9–19 August 2016
- Teams: 8 (from 4 confederations)
- Competitors: 104

Final positions
- Champions: United States (2nd title)
- Runners-up: Italy
- Third place: Russia
- Fourth place: Hungary

Tournament statistics
- Matches: 24
- Goals scored: 435 (18.13 per match)
- Multiple appearances: 4-time Olympian(s): 1; 3-time Olympian(s): 12
- Multiple medalists: 3-time medalist(s): 1
- Top scorer(s): (United States) Maggie Steffens (17 goals in 6 matches)
- Most saves: (Italy) Giulia Gorlero (65 saves in 6 matches)
- Top sprinter(s): (United States) Rachel Fattal (17 sprints won in 6 matches)
- MVP: (United States) Maggie Steffens

The women's tournament of Water polo at the 2016 Summer Olympics at Rio de Janeiro, Brazil, began on 9 August and ended on 19 August 2016. Games were held at the Maria Lenk Aquatics Centre and the Olympic Aquatics Stadium.

The United States won the gold medal by defeating Italy 12–5 in the final. Russia captured bronze, beating Hungary 19–18.

== Competition schedule ==
G	Group stage	QF	Quarter-finals	SF	Semi-finals	B	Bronze medal match	F	Final

Tue 9	Wed 10	Thu 11	Fri 12	Sat 13	Sun 14	Mon 15	Tue 16	Wed 17	Thu 18	Fri 19	
G		G		G		QF		SF		B	F

== Qualification ==
Qualification	Date	Host	Berths	Qualified
Host nation	2 October 2009	(Denmark) Copenhagen	1	Brazil
Oceanian Continental Selection	19 October 2015	(Australia) Perth	1	Australia
2015 Asian Championship	16–17 December 2015	(China) Foshan	1	China
2016 European Championships	10–22 January 2016	(Serbia) Belgrade	1	Hungary
World Qualification Tournament	21–28 March 2016	(Netherlands) Gouda	4	United States
World Qualification Tournament	21–28 March 2016	(Netherlands) Gouda	4	Italy
World Qualification Tournament	21–28 March 2016	(Netherlands) Gouda	4	Russia
World Qualification Tournament	21–28 March 2016	(Netherlands) Gouda	4	Spain
Total			8	

== Draw ==
The draw was held on 10 April 2016.

Teams from eight nations compete in the tournament and were seeded into two groups for the preliminary round.

=== Seeding ===
The seeding was announced on 10 April 2016.

Pot 1	Pot 2	Pot 3	Pot 4
Hungary; Australia	United States; Italy	Russia; China	Spain; Brazil

== Referees ==
The following referees were selected for the tournament.

- (Argentina) German Moller
- (Australia) Daniel Flahive
- (Azerbaijan) Mark Koganov
- (Brazil) Fabio Toffoli
- (Canada) Marie-Claude Deslières
- (China) Ni Shi Wei
- (Croatia) Nenad Peris
- (Egypt) Hatem Gaber
- (France) Benjamin Mercier
- (Greece) Georgios Stavridis
- (Hungary) Péter Molnár
- (Iran) Masoud Rezvani
- (Italy) Fillippo Gomez
- (Japan) Tadao Tahara
- (Montenegro) Stanko Ivanovski
- (Netherlands) Diana Dutilh-Dumas
- (Poland) Radosław Koryzna
- (Romania) Adrian Alexandrescu
- (Russia) Sergey Naumov
- (Serbia) Vojin Putniković
- (Slovenia) Boris Margeta
- (South Africa) Dion Willis
- (Spain) Francesc Buch
- (United States) Joseph Peila

== Preliminary round ==
=== Group A ===
All times are BRT (UTC-3).

Pos	Team	Pld	W	D	L	GF	GA	GD	Pts	Qualification
1	Italy	3	3	0	0	27	15	+12	6	Quarter-finals
2	Australia	3	2	0	1	31	15	+16	4	Quarter-finals
3	Russia	3	1	0	2	23	31	−8	2	Quarter-finals
4	Brazil (H)	3	0	0	3	13	33	−20	0	Quarter-finals

Source: Rio2016
Rules for classification: 1) Points; 2) Head-to-head points; 3) Head-to-head goal difference; 4) Head-to-head goals scored; 5) Goal difference.
(H) Hosts

9 August 2016; 10:20	Report	Italy	9–3	Brazil	Maria Lenk Aquatic Center, Rio de Janeiro; Referees: Diana Dutilh-Dumas (NED), Dion Willis (RSA)
9 August 2016; 10:20	Report	Score by quarters: 1–1, 2–0, 3–0, 3–2			Maria Lenk Aquatic Center, Rio de Janeiro; Referees: Diana Dutilh-Dumas (NED), Dion Willis (RSA)
9 August 2016; 10:20	Report	Bianconi 3	Goals	three players 1	Maria Lenk Aquatic Center, Rio de Janeiro; Referees: Diana Dutilh-Dumas (NED), Dion Willis (RSA)

9 August 2016; 13:00	Report	Russia	4–14	Australia	Maria Lenk Aquatic Center, Rio de Janeiro; Referees: Marie-Claude Deslières (CAN), Adrian Alexandrescu (ROU)
9 August 2016; 13:00	Report	Score by quarters: 0–3, 1–5, 3–2, 0–4			Maria Lenk Aquatic Center, Rio de Janeiro; Referees: Marie-Claude Deslières (CAN), Adrian Alexandrescu (ROU)
9 August 2016; 13:00	Report	Prokofyeva 2	Goals	Southern 4	Maria Lenk Aquatic Center, Rio de Janeiro; Referees: Marie-Claude Deslières (CAN), Adrian Alexandrescu (ROU)

11 August 2016; 09:00	Report	Russia	14–7	Brazil	Maria Lenk Aquatic Center, Rio de Janeiro; Referees: Diana Dutilh-Dumas (NED), Tadao Tahara (JPN)
11 August 2016; 09:00	Report	Score by quarters: 2–4, 2–0, 4–2, 6–1			Maria Lenk Aquatic Center, Rio de Janeiro; Referees: Diana Dutilh-Dumas (NED), Tadao Tahara (JPN)
11 August 2016; 09:00	Report	Ivanova, Prokofyeva 3	Goals	Chiappini 4	Maria Lenk Aquatic Center, Rio de Janeiro; Referees: Diana Dutilh-Dumas (NED), Tadao Tahara (JPN)

11 August 2016; 10:20	Report	Italy	8–7	Australia	Maria Lenk Aquatic Center, Rio de Janeiro; Referees: Péter Molnár (HUN), Boris Margeta (SLO)
11 August 2016; 10:20	Report	Score by quarters: 4–2, 0–1, 2–3, 2–1			Maria Lenk Aquatic Center, Rio de Janeiro; Referees: Péter Molnár (HUN), Boris Margeta (SLO)
11 August 2016; 10:20	Report	Garibotti 3	Goals	Southern, Webster 2	Maria Lenk Aquatic Center, Rio de Janeiro; Referees: Péter Molnár (HUN), Boris Margeta (SLO)

13 August 2016; 10:20	Report	Russia	5–10	Italy	Maria Lenk Aquatic Center, Rio de Janeiro; Referees: Joseph Peila (USA), Adrian Alexandrescu (ROU)
13 August 2016; 10:20	Report	Score by quarters: 2–3, 1–2, 1–3, 1–2			Maria Lenk Aquatic Center, Rio de Janeiro; Referees: Joseph Peila (USA), Adrian Alexandrescu (ROU)
13 August 2016; 10:20	Report	Grineva 2	Goals	Bianconi 3	Maria Lenk Aquatic Center, Rio de Janeiro; Referees: Joseph Peila (USA), Adrian Alexandrescu (ROU)

13 August 2016; 11:40	Report	Australia	10–3	Brazil	Maria Lenk Aquatic Center, Rio de Janeiro; Referees: Dion Willis (RSA), Benjamin Mercier (FRA)
13 August 2016; 11:40	Report	Score by quarters: 1–1, 4–1, 2–0, 3–1			Maria Lenk Aquatic Center, Rio de Janeiro; Referees: Dion Willis (RSA), Benjamin Mercier (FRA)
13 August 2016; 11:40	Report	Gofers, Webster 2	Goals	three players 3	Maria Lenk Aquatic Center, Rio de Janeiro; Referees: Dion Willis (RSA), Benjamin Mercier (FRA)

=== Group B ===
All times are BRT (UTC-3).

Pos	Team	Pld	W	D	L	GF	GA	GD	Pts	Qualification
1	United States	3	3	0	0	34	14	+20	6	Quarter-finals
2	Spain	3	2	0	1	27	29	−2	4	Quarter-finals
3	Hungary	3	1	0	2	29	33	−4	2	Quarter-finals
4	China	3	0	0	3	23	37	−14	0	Quarter-finals

Source: Rio2016
Rules for classification: 1) Points; 2) Head-to-head points; 3) Head-to-head goal difference; 4) Head-to-head goals scored; 5) Goal difference.

9 August 2016; 09:00	Report	China	11–13	Hungary	Maria Lenk Aquatic Center, Rio de Janeiro; Referees: Nenad Peris (CRO), Georgios Stavridis (GRE)
9 August 2016; 09:00	Report	Score by quarters: 2–2, 4–4, 3–6, 2–1			Maria Lenk Aquatic Center, Rio de Janeiro; Referees: Nenad Peris (CRO), Georgios Stavridis (GRE)
9 August 2016; 09:00	Report	Ma Huanhuan, Niu Guannan 3	Goals	Czigány 4	Maria Lenk Aquatic Center, Rio de Janeiro; Referees: Nenad Peris (CRO), Georgios Stavridis (GRE)

9 August 2016; 11:40	Report	Spain	4–11	United States	Maria Lenk Aquatic Center, Rio de Janeiro; Referees: Daniel Flahive (AUS), Filippo Gomez (ITA)
9 August 2016; 11:40	Report	Score by quarters: 1–4, 1–3, 2–2, 0–2			Maria Lenk Aquatic Center, Rio de Janeiro; Referees: Daniel Flahive (AUS), Filippo Gomez (ITA)
9 August 2016; 11:40	Report	García 2	Goals	three players 2	Maria Lenk Aquatic Center, Rio de Janeiro; Referees: Daniel Flahive (AUS), Filippo Gomez (ITA)

11 August 2016; 11:40	Report	China	4–12	United States	Maria Lenk Aquatic Center, Rio de Janeiro; Referees: Radosław Koryzna (POL), Filippo Gomez (ITA)
11 August 2016; 11:40	Report	Score by quarters: 1–4, 0–3, 2–3, 1–2			Maria Lenk Aquatic Center, Rio de Janeiro; Referees: Radosław Koryzna (POL), Filippo Gomez (ITA)
11 August 2016; 11:40	Report	four players 1	Goals	Musselman, Steffens 4	Maria Lenk Aquatic Center, Rio de Janeiro; Referees: Radosław Koryzna (POL), Filippo Gomez (ITA)

11 August 2016; 13:00	Report	Spain	11–10	Hungary	Maria Lenk Aquatic Center, Rio de Janeiro; Referees: Marie-Claude Deslières (CAN), Vojin Putniković (SRB)
11 August 2016; 13:00	Report	Score by quarters: 2–2, 4–4, 4–1, 1–3			Maria Lenk Aquatic Center, Rio de Janeiro; Referees: Marie-Claude Deslières (CAN), Vojin Putniković (SRB)
11 August 2016; 13:00	Report	five players 2	Goals	Bujka 5	Maria Lenk Aquatic Center, Rio de Janeiro; Referees: Marie-Claude Deslières (CAN), Vojin Putniković (SRB)

13 August 2016; 09:00	Report	China	8–12	Spain	Maria Lenk Aquatic Center, Rio de Janeiro; Referees: Boris Margeta (SLO), German Moller (ARG)
13 August 2016; 09:00	Report	Score by quarters: 2–3, 4–4, 1–2, 1–3			Maria Lenk Aquatic Center, Rio de Janeiro; Referees: Boris Margeta (SLO), German Moller (ARG)
13 August 2016; 09:00	Report	Zhang Cong 3	Goals	López 4	Maria Lenk Aquatic Center, Rio de Janeiro; Referees: Boris Margeta (SLO), German Moller (ARG)

13 August 2016; 13:00	Report	Hungary	6–11	United States	Maria Lenk Aquatic Center, Rio de Janeiro; Referees: Marie-Claude Deslières (CAN), Diana Dutilh-Dumas (NED)
13 August 2016; 13:00	Report	Score by quarters: 2–2, 1–5, 1–1, 2–3			Maria Lenk Aquatic Center, Rio de Janeiro; Referees: Marie-Claude Deslières (CAN), Diana Dutilh-Dumas (NED)
13 August 2016; 13:00	Report	Szűcs 2	Goals	Steffens 4	Maria Lenk Aquatic Center, Rio de Janeiro; Referees: Marie-Claude Deslières (CAN), Diana Dutilh-Dumas (NED)

== Final round ==
Final Bracket

Quarterfinals
A1	Italy	12
B4	China	7
A3	Russia	12
B2	Spain	10
A2	Australia	11
B3	Hungary (PSO)	13
A4	Brazil	3
B1	United States	13

Semifinals
A3	Russia	9
A1	Italy	12
B3	Hungary	10
B1	United States	14

Gold medal match
United States	12
Italy	5
Bronze medal match
4	Hungary	18
Russia (PSO)	19

5th place bracket

5th–8th place classification
Australia	11
Brazil	4
Spain	11
China	6

5th place match
Australia	10
Spain	12
7th place match
Brazil	5
China	10

=== Quarterfinals ===
All times are BRT (UTC-3).

15 August 2016; 14:10	Report	Brazil	3–13	United States	Olympic Aquatics Stadium, Rio de Janeiro; Referees: Diana Dutilh-Dumas (NED), Tadao Tahara (JPN)
15 August 2016; 14:10	Report	Score by quarters: 0–5, 0–3, 0–5, 3–0			Olympic Aquatics Stadium, Rio de Janeiro; Referees: Diana Dutilh-Dumas (NED), Tadao Tahara (JPN)
15 August 2016; 14:10	Report	three players 1	Goals	four players 2	Olympic Aquatics Stadium, Rio de Janeiro; Referees: Diana Dutilh-Dumas (NED), Tadao Tahara (JPN)

15 August 2016; 15:30	Report	Australia	11–13 (PSO)	Hungary	Olympic Aquatics Stadium, Rio de Janeiro; Referees: Francesc Buch (ESP), Vojin Putniković (SRB)
15 August 2016; 15:30	Report	Score by quarters: 1–3, 2–2, 3–2, 2–1 PSO: 3–5			Olympic Aquatics Stadium, Rio de Janeiro; Referees: Francesc Buch (ESP), Vojin Putniković (SRB)
15 August 2016; 15:30	Report	Southern 3	Goals	Bujka, Keszthelyi 2	Olympic Aquatics Stadium, Rio de Janeiro; Referees: Francesc Buch (ESP), Vojin Putniković (SRB)

15 August 2016; 18:20	Report	Russia	12–10	Spain	Olympic Aquatics Stadium, Rio de Janeiro; Referees: Marie-Claude Deslières (CAN), Nenad Peris (CRO)
15 August 2016; 18:20	Report	Score by quarters: 2–3, 3–2, 5–3, 2–2			Olympic Aquatics Stadium, Rio de Janeiro; Referees: Marie-Claude Deslières (CAN), Nenad Peris (CRO)
15 August 2016; 18:20	Report	Fedotova 4	Goals	López, Tarragó 3	Olympic Aquatics Stadium, Rio de Janeiro; Referees: Marie-Claude Deslières (CAN), Nenad Peris (CRO)

15 August 2016; 19:40	Report	Italy	12–7	China	Olympic Aquatics Stadium, Rio de Janeiro; Referees: Georgios Stavridis (GRE), Adrian Alexandrescu (ROU)
15 August 2016; 19:40	Report	Score by quarters: 1–1, 3–1, 4–2, 4–3			Olympic Aquatics Stadium, Rio de Janeiro; Referees: Georgios Stavridis (GRE), Adrian Alexandrescu (ROU)
15 August 2016; 19:40	Report	Bianconi 3	Goals	Zhang Cong 3	Olympic Aquatics Stadium, Rio de Janeiro; Referees: Georgios Stavridis (GRE), Adrian Alexandrescu (ROU)

=== 5th–8th place classification ===
All times are BRT (UTC-3).

17 August 2016; 11:00	Report	Australia	11–4	Brazil	Olympic Aquatics Stadium, Rio de Janeiro; Referees: Ni Shi Wei (CHN), Marie Deslières (CAN)
17 August 2016; 11:00	Report	Score by quarters: 2–1, 3–1, 4–1, 2–1			Olympic Aquatics Stadium, Rio de Janeiro; Referees: Ni Shi Wei (CHN), Marie Deslières (CAN)
17 August 2016; 11:00	Report	Arancini, Southern 3	Goals	Chiappini 2	Olympic Aquatics Stadium, Rio de Janeiro; Referees: Ni Shi Wei (CHN), Marie Deslières (CAN)

17 August 2016; 15:10	Report	Spain	11–6	China	Olympic Aquatics Stadium, Rio de Janeiro; Referees: Radosław Koryzna (POL), Fabio Toffoli (ITA)
17 August 2016; 15:10	Report	Score by quarters: 2–2, 2–0, 4–2, 3–2			Olympic Aquatics Stadium, Rio de Janeiro; Referees: Radosław Koryzna (POL), Fabio Toffoli (ITA)
17 August 2016; 15:10	Report	five players 2	Goals	Ma Huanhuan 2	Olympic Aquatics Stadium, Rio de Janeiro; Referees: Radosław Koryzna (POL), Fabio Toffoli (ITA)

=== Semifinals ===
All times are BRT (UTC-3).

17 August 2016; 12:20	Report	Russia	9–12	Italy	Olympic Aquatics Stadium, Rio de Janeiro; Referees: Mark Koganov (AZE), Francesc Buch (ESP)
17 August 2016; 12:20	Report	Score by quarters: 2–2, 2–4, 0–2, 5–4			Olympic Aquatics Stadium, Rio de Janeiro; Referees: Mark Koganov (AZE), Francesc Buch (ESP)
17 August 2016; 12:20	Report	Ivanova, Lisunova 2	Goals	Garibotti 5	Olympic Aquatics Stadium, Rio de Janeiro; Referees: Mark Koganov (AZE), Francesc Buch (ESP)

17 August 2016; 16:30	Report	Hungary	10–14	United States	Olympic Aquatics Stadium, Rio de Janeiro; Referees: Daniel Flahive (AUS), Georgios Stavridis (GRE)
17 August 2016; 16:30	Report	Score by quarters: 2–3, 3–5, 3–4, 2–2			Olympic Aquatics Stadium, Rio de Janeiro; Referees: Daniel Flahive (AUS), Georgios Stavridis (GRE)
17 August 2016; 16:30	Report	Keszthelyi 4	Goals	Steffens 4	Olympic Aquatics Stadium, Rio de Janeiro; Referees: Daniel Flahive (AUS), Georgios Stavridis (GRE)

=== 7th place match ===
All times are BRT (UTC-3).

19 August 2016; 10:00	Report	Brazil	5–10	China	Olympic Aquatics Stadium, Rio de Janeiro; Referees: Daniel Flahive (AUS), Nenad Peris (CRO)
19 August 2016; 10:00	Report	Score by quarters: 2–2, 0–2, 0–2, 3–4			Olympic Aquatics Stadium, Rio de Janeiro; Referees: Daniel Flahive (AUS), Nenad Peris (CRO)
19 August 2016; 10:00	Report	Chiappini 3	Goals	three players 2	Olympic Aquatics Stadium, Rio de Janeiro; Referees: Daniel Flahive (AUS), Nenad Peris (CRO)

=== 5th place match ===
All times are BRT (UTC-3).

19 August 2016; 14:10	Report	Australia	10–12	Spain	Olympic Aquatics Stadium, Rio de Janeiro; Referees: Marie-Claude Deslières (CAN), Sergey Naumov (RUS)
19 August 2016; 14:10	Report	Score by quarters: 5–4, 2–3, 1–3, 2–2			Olympic Aquatics Stadium, Rio de Janeiro; Referees: Marie-Claude Deslières (CAN), Sergey Naumov (RUS)
19 August 2016; 14:10	Report	Buckling 3	Goals	Tarragó 7	Olympic Aquatics Stadium, Rio de Janeiro; Referees: Marie-Claude Deslières (CAN), Sergey Naumov (RUS)

=== Bronze medal match ===
All times are BRT (UTC-3).

19 August 2016; 11:20	Report	Hungary	18–19 (PSO)	Russia	Olympic Aquatics Stadium, Rio de Janeiro; Referees: Diana Dutilh-Dumas (NED), Fillippo Gomez (ITA)
19 August 2016; 11:20	Report	Score by quarters: 3–3, 3–4, 3–1, 3–4 PSO: 6–7			Olympic Aquatics Stadium, Rio de Janeiro; Referees: Diana Dutilh-Dumas (NED), Fillippo Gomez (ITA)
19 August 2016; 11:20	Report	Bujka 3	Goals	Fedotova 5	Olympic Aquatics Stadium, Rio de Janeiro; Referees: Diana Dutilh-Dumas (NED), Fillippo Gomez (ITA)

=== Gold medal match ===
All times are BRT (UTC-3).

19 August 2016; 15:30	Report	United States	12–5	Italy	Olympic Aquatics Stadium, Rio de Janeiro; Referees: Adrian Alexandrescu (ROU), Francesc Buch (ESP)
19 August 2016; 15:30	Report	Score by quarters: 4–1, 1–2, 4–1, 3–1			Olympic Aquatics Stadium, Rio de Janeiro; Referees: Adrian Alexandrescu (ROU), Francesc Buch (ESP)
19 August 2016; 15:30	Report	Neushul 3	Goals	Radicchi 2	Olympic Aquatics Stadium, Rio de Janeiro; Referees: Adrian Alexandrescu (ROU), Francesc Buch (ESP)

== Ranking and statistics ==
=== Final ranking ===
Rank	Team
Gold medal	United States
Silver medal	Italy
Bronze medal	Russia
4	Hungary
5	Spain
6	Australia
7	China
8	Brazil

2016 Women's Olympic champions

United States
Second title

=== Multi-time Olympians ===
Four-time Olympian(s): 1 player

- Italy: Tania Di Mario

Three-time Olympian(s): 12 players

- Australia: Gemma Beadsworth, Bronwen Knox
- China: Ma Huanhuan, Sun Yating, Yang Jun (GK)
- Hungary: Orsolya Takács
- Italy: Teresa Frassinetti
- Russia: Nadezhda Glyzina-Fedotova, Ekaterina Lisunova, Ekaterina Prokofyeva, Evgenia Soboleva
- United States: Kami Craig

=== Multiple medalists ===
Three-time Olympic medalist(s): 1 player

- United States: Kami Craig

=== Top goalscorers ===
Rank	Name	Goals	Shots	%
1	(United States) Maggie Steffens	17	24	71
2	(Hungary) Barbara Bujka	15	23	65
2	(Spain) Roser Tarragó	15	35	43
4	(Australia) Ashleigh Southern	14	36	39
4	(Hungary) Rita Keszthelyi	14	36	39
6	(Italy) Roberta Bianconi	13	33	39
6	(Russia) Nadezhda Fedotova	13	27	48
8	(Brazil) Izabella Chiappini	12	49	25
8	(Italy) Arianna Garibotti	12	28	43
8	(United States) Madeline Musselmann	12	25	48

Source: Rio2016

=== Top goalkeepers ===
Rank	Name	%	Saves	Shots
1	(United States) Ashleigh Johnson	65	51	79
2	(Italy) Giulia Gorlero	61	65	106
3	(United States) Samantha Hill	60	6	10
4	(Australia) Lea Yanitsas	59	27	46
5	(Brazil) Tess Oliveira	49	34	69
6	(Australia) Kelsey Wakefield	47	18	38
7	(China) Yang Jun	47	55	118
8	(Spain) Laura Ester	44	41	94
9	(Hungary) Orsolya Kasó	42	27	64
10	(Brazil) Victória Chamorro	42	23	55

Source: Rio2016

== Medalists ==
Gold	Silver	Bronze
United States Samantha Hill; Maddie Musselman; Melissa Seidemann; Rachel Fattal; Caroline Clark; Maggie Steffens; Courtney Mathewson; Kiley Neushul; Aria Fischer; Kaleigh Gilchrist; Makenzie Fischer; Kami Craig; Ashleigh Johnson Head coach: Adam Krikorian	Italy Giulia Gorlero; Chiara Tabani; Arianna Garibotti; Elisa Queirolo; Federica Radicchi; Rosaria Aiello; Tania Di Mario; Roberta Bianconi; Giulia Enrica Emmolo; Francesca Pomeri; Aleksandra Cotti; Teresa Frassinetti; Laura Teani Head coach: Fabio Conti	Russia Anna Ustyukhina; Maria Borisova; Ekaterina Prokofyeva; Elvina Karimova; Nadezhda Fedotova; Olga Belova; Ekaterina Lisunova; Anastasia Simanovich; Anna Timofeeva; Evgenia Soboleva; Evgeniya Ivanova; Anna Grineva; Anna Karnaukh Head coach: Alexandr Gaidukov

== Awards ==
The women's all-star team was announced on 19 August 2016.

Most Valuable Player

- (United States) Maggie Steffens (17 goals, 1 sprints won)

Media All-Star Team

- Goalkeeper
  - (United States) Ashleigh Johnson (51 saves)
- Field players
  - (Hungary) Barbara Bujka (centre forward, left-handed, 15 goals)
  - (Italy) Arianna Garibotti (12 goals)
  - (Hungary) Rita Keszthelyi (14 goals, 10 sprints won)
  - (United States) Maddie Musselman (12 goals)
  - (Australia) Ashleigh Southern (14 goals)
  - (United States) Maggie Steffens (17 goals, 1 sprints won)

== See also ==
- Water polo at the 2016 Summer Olympics – Men's tournament

== Sources ==
- PDF documents in the Olympic World Library:
  - Official Results Book – 2016 Olympic Games – Water Polo (archive)
- Water polo on the Olympedia website
  - Water polo at the 2016 Summer Olympics (women's tournament)
- Water polo on the Sports Reference website
  - Water polo at the 2016 Summer Games (women's tournament) (archived)
