= Francesca Pomeri =

Italian water polo player (born 1993)

Personal information
- Born: 18 February 1993 (age 33)
- Height: 174 cm (5 ft 9 in)
- Weight: 76 kg (168 lb)

Sport
- Sport: Water polo
- Club: Città di Cosenza
Medal record
Representing Italy
Olympic Games
Silver medal – second place	2016 Rio de Janeiro	team
World Championships
Bronze medal – third place	2015 Kazan	team
European Championship
Bronze medal – third place	2016 Belgrade	team

Francesca Pomeri (born 18 February 1993) is a water polo player from Italy. She was part of the Italian team at the 2016 Summer Olympics, where the team won the silver medal.

== See also ==
- List of Olympic medalists in water polo (women)
- List of World Aquatics Championships medalists in water polo
