= Laura Teani =

Italian water polo player

Personal information
- Nationality: Italian
- Born: 13 March 1991 (age 35) Bergamo, Italy
- Height: 1.75 m (5 ft 9 in)
- Weight: 75 kg (165 lb)

Sport
- Country: Italy
- Sport: Water polo
Medal record
Women's water polo
Representing Italy
Olympic Games
Silver medal – second place	2016 Rio de Janeiro	Team
World Championships
Bronze medal – third place	2015 Kazan	Team
European Championships
Bronze medal – third place	2016 Belgrade
Universiade
Bronze medal – third place	2013 Kazan	Team

Laura Teani (born 13 March 1991) is an Italian water polo player of Italy.

She was part of the Italian team winning the bronze medal at the 2015 World Aquatics Championships, where she played as goalkeeper. She participated in the 2016 Summer Olympics.

== See also ==
- Italy women's Olympic water polo team records and statistics
- List of Olympic medalists in water polo (women)
- List of women's Olympic water polo tournament goalkeepers
- List of World Aquatics Championships medalists in water polo
