= 2016 Women's European Water Polo Championship =

Tournament details
- Host country: Serbia
- Venue: 1 (in 1 host city)
- Dates: 10–22 January
- Teams: 12 (from 1 confederation)

Final positions
- Champions: Hungary (3rd title)
- Runners-up: Netherlands
- Third place: Italy
- Fourth place: Spain

Tournament statistics
- Matches played: 44
- Goals scored: 963 (21.89 per match)
- Top scorers: (Hungary) Rita Keszthelyi (23 goals)

Awards
- Best player: (Netherlands) Yasemin Smit

The 2016 Women's European Water Polo Championship was held from 10 to 22 January 2016 in Belgrade, Serbia.

Hungary won their third title by defeating the Netherlands 9–7 in the final. Italy captured the bronze medal after a 10–9 win over Spain.

== Format ==
The twelve teams were split into two groups of six teams. The first four placed teams advance to the knockout stage, from which on a knockout-system will be used to determine the final positions.

== Draw ==
The draw was held on 4 October 2015.

Pot 1	Pot 2	Pot 3	Pot 4	Pot 5	Pot 6
Spain; Netherlands	Hungary; Serbia	Russia; Italy	Germany; Greece	Portugal; France	Turkey; Croatia

== Preliminary round ==
=== Group A ===
All times are CET (UTC+1).

Pos	Team	Pld	W	D	L	GF	GA	GD	Pts	Qualification
1	Netherlands	5	5	0	0	92	29	+63	15	Advanced to quarterfinals
2	Hungary	5	4	0	1	82	31	+51	12	Advanced to quarterfinals
3	Russia	5	3	0	2	83	36	+47	9	Advanced to quarterfinals
4	Greece	5	2	0	3	77	42	+35	6	Advanced to quarterfinals
5	Portugal	5	1	0	4	21	111	−90	3	Advanced to 9th place match
6	Turkey	5	0	0	5	14	120	−106	0	Advanced to 11th place match

Source: wpbelgrade2016.com
Rules for classification: 1) points; 2) head-to-head points; 3) head-to-head goal difference; 4) head-to-head number of goals scored; 5) goal difference.

10 January 2016; 11:00	Report	Portugal	3–27	Greece	Kombank Arena, Belgrade; Referees: Martina Kuníková (SVK), Stanko Ivanovski (MNE)
10 January 2016; 11:00	Report	Score by quarters: 1–7, 1–7, 0–5, 1–8			Kombank Arena, Belgrade; Referees: Martina Kuníková (SVK), Stanko Ivanovski (MNE)
10 January 2016; 11:00	Report	three players 1	Goals	Asimaki, Tsoukala 5	Kombank Arena, Belgrade; Referees: Martina Kuníková (SVK), Stanko Ivanovski (MNE)

10 January 2016; 12:30	Report	Russia	29–0	Turkey	Kombank Arena, Belgrade; Referees: Ursula Wengenroth (SUI), Vojin Putniković (SRB)
10 January 2016; 12:30	Report	Score by quarters: 8–0, 5–0, 8–0, 8–0			Kombank Arena, Belgrade; Referees: Ursula Wengenroth (SUI), Vojin Putniković (SRB)
10 January 2016; 12:30	Report	Simanovich 5	Goals		Kombank Arena, Belgrade; Referees: Ursula Wengenroth (SUI), Vojin Putniković (SRB)

10 January 2016; 15:15	Report	Netherlands	14–10	Hungary	Kombank Arena, Belgrade; Referees: Xavier Buch (ESP), Radosław Koryzna (POL)
10 January 2016; 15:15	Report	Score by quarters: 4–1, 4–2, 4–3, 2–4			Kombank Arena, Belgrade; Referees: Xavier Buch (ESP), Radosław Koryzna (POL)
10 January 2016; 15:15	Report	Smit 6	Goals	Antal, Bujka 3	Kombank Arena, Belgrade; Referees: Xavier Buch (ESP), Radosław Koryzna (POL)

12 January 2016; 11:00	Report	Portugal	5–21	Russia	Kombank Arena, Belgrade; Referees: Mario Dalli (MLT), Stanko Ivanovski (MNE)
12 January 2016; 11:00	Report	Score by quarters: 0–6, 1–5, 1–4, 3–6			Kombank Arena, Belgrade; Referees: Mario Dalli (MLT), Stanko Ivanovski (MNE)
12 January 2016; 11:00	Report	Braga 2	Goals	Prokofyeva 6	Kombank Arena, Belgrade; Referees: Mario Dalli (MLT), Stanko Ivanovski (MNE)

12 January 2016; 12:30	Report	Turkey	0–25	Netherlands	Kombank Arena, Belgrade; Referees: Dragan Štampalija (CRO), Martina Kuníková (SVK)
12 January 2016; 12:30	Report	Score by quarters: 0–8, 0–6, 0–7, 0–4			Kombank Arena, Belgrade; Referees: Dragan Štampalija (CRO), Martina Kuníková (SVK)
12 January 2016; 12:30	Report		Goals	Sevenich 6	Kombank Arena, Belgrade; Referees: Dragan Štampalija (CRO), Martina Kuníková (SVK)

12 January 2016; 15:45	Report	Greece	6–9	Hungary	Kombank Arena, Belgrade; Referees: Vojin Putniković (SRB), Alessandro Severo (ITA)
12 January 2016; 15:45	Report	Score by quarters: 2–3, 1–2, 2–2, 1–2			Kombank Arena, Belgrade; Referees: Vojin Putniković (SRB), Alessandro Severo (ITA)
12 January 2016; 15:45	Report	Asimaki 2	Goals	Illés 2	Kombank Arena, Belgrade; Referees: Vojin Putniković (SRB), Alessandro Severo (ITA)

14 January 2016; 11:00	Report	Netherlands	28–2	Portugal	Kombank Arena, Belgrade; Referees: Benjamin Mercier (FRA), Vojin Putniković (SRB)
14 January 2016; 11:00	Report	Score by quarters: 6–0, 7–2, 9–0, 6–0			Kombank Arena, Belgrade; Referees: Benjamin Mercier (FRA), Vojin Putniković (SRB)
14 January 2016; 11:00	Report	Klaassen 5	Goals	Airosa 2	Kombank Arena, Belgrade; Referees: Benjamin Mercier (FRA), Vojin Putniković (SRB)

14 January 2016; 12:30	Report	Hungary	27–1	Turkey	Kombank Arena, Belgrade; Referees: Ursula Wengenroth (SUI), Irakli Kikalishvili (GEO)
14 January 2016; 12:30	Report	Score by quarters: 7–0, 6–1, 9–0, 5–0			Kombank Arena, Belgrade; Referees: Ursula Wengenroth (SUI), Irakli Kikalishvili (GEO)
14 January 2016; 12:30	Report	Keszthelyi, Kisteleki 6	Goals	Cavlak 1	Kombank Arena, Belgrade; Referees: Ursula Wengenroth (SUI), Irakli Kikalishvili (GEO)

14 January 2016; 15:45	Report	Russia	16–6	Greece	Kombank Arena, Belgrade; Referees: Matan Schwartz (ISR), Adrian Alexandrescu (ROU)
14 January 2016; 15:45	Report	Score by quarters: 3–2, 5–1, 1–1, 7–2			Kombank Arena, Belgrade; Referees: Matan Schwartz (ISR), Adrian Alexandrescu (ROU)
14 January 2016; 15:45	Report	Simanovich, Tankeeva 3	Goals	Manolioudaki, Tsoukala 2	Kombank Arena, Belgrade; Referees: Matan Schwartz (ISR), Adrian Alexandrescu (ROU)

16 January 2016; 11:00	Report	Portugal	0–25	Hungary	Kombank Arena, Belgrade; Referees: Ursula Wengenroth (SUI), Mario Dalli (MLT)
16 January 2016; 11:00	Report	Score by quarters: 0–9, 0–6, 0–4, 0–6			Kombank Arena, Belgrade; Referees: Ursula Wengenroth (SUI), Mario Dalli (MLT)
16 January 2016; 11:00	Report		Goals	Bujka, Kisteleki 4	Kombank Arena, Belgrade; Referees: Ursula Wengenroth (SUI), Mario Dalli (MLT)

16 January 2016; 12:30	Report	Greece	28–3	Turkey	Kombank Arena, Belgrade; Referees: Xavier Buch (ESP), Martina Kuníková (SVK)
16 January 2016; 12:30	Report	Score by quarters: 6–0, 7–1, 7–1, 8–1			Kombank Arena, Belgrade; Referees: Xavier Buch (ESP), Martina Kuníková (SVK)
16 January 2016; 12:30	Report	Asimaki 6	Goals	Kus 2	Kombank Arena, Belgrade; Referees: Xavier Buch (ESP), Martina Kuníková (SVK)

16 January 2016; 15:45	Report	Russia	7–14	Netherlands	Kombank Arena, Belgrade; Referees: Alessandro Severo (ITA), Frank Ohme (GER)
16 January 2016; 15:45	Report	Score by quarters: 2–5, 2–3, 1–3, 2–3			Kombank Arena, Belgrade; Referees: Alessandro Severo (ITA), Frank Ohme (GER)
16 January 2016; 15:45	Report	Soboleva 2	Goals	Klaassen 5	Kombank Arena, Belgrade; Referees: Alessandro Severo (ITA), Frank Ohme (GER)

18 January 2016; 12:30	Report	Portugal	11–10	Turkey	Kombank Arena, Belgrade; Referees: Mark Koganov (AZE), Frank Ohme (GER)
18 January 2016; 12:30	Report	Score by quarters: 2–2, 3–3, 4–1, 2–4			Kombank Arena, Belgrade; Referees: Mark Koganov (AZE), Frank Ohme (GER)
18 January 2016; 12:30	Report	Matos, Sarmento 3	Goals	Kus 7	Kombank Arena, Belgrade; Referees: Mark Koganov (AZE), Frank Ohme (GER)

18 January 2016; 15:45	Report	Netherlands	11–10	Greece	Kombank Arena, Belgrade; Referees: Stanko Ivanovski (MNE), Radosław Koryzna (POL)
18 January 2016; 15:45	Report	Score by quarters: 1–3, 3–3, 3–4, 4–0			Kombank Arena, Belgrade; Referees: Stanko Ivanovski (MNE), Radosław Koryzna (POL)
18 January 2016; 15:45	Report	Van der Sloot 3	Goals	Avramidou 3	Kombank Arena, Belgrade; Referees: Stanko Ivanovski (MNE), Radosław Koryzna (POL)

18 January 2016; 17:15	Report	Hungary	11–10	Russia	Kombank Arena, Belgrade; Referees: Adrian Alexandrescu (ROU), Vojin Putniković (SRB)
18 January 2016; 17:15	Report	Score by quarters: 2–1, 4–1, 3–3, 2–5			Kombank Arena, Belgrade; Referees: Adrian Alexandrescu (ROU), Vojin Putniković (SRB)
18 January 2016; 17:15	Report	Keszthelyi 6	Goals	Lisunova 3	Kombank Arena, Belgrade; Referees: Adrian Alexandrescu (ROU), Vojin Putniković (SRB)

=== Group B ===
All times are CET (UTC+1).

Pos	Team	Pld	W	D	L	GF	GA	GD	Pts	Qualification
1	Italy	5	5	0	0	91	19	+72	15	Advanced to quarterfinals
2	Spain	5	4	0	1	105	23	+82	12	Advanced to quarterfinals
3	France	5	3	0	2	38	43	−5	9	Advanced to quarterfinals
4	Germany	5	2	0	3	43	82	−39	6	Advanced to quarterfinals
5	Serbia	5	1	0	4	36	65	−29	3	Advanced to 9th place match
6	Croatia	5	0	0	5	21	102	−81	0	Advanced to 11th place match

Source: wpbelgrade2016.com
Rules for classification: 1) points; 2) head-to-head points; 3) head-to-head goal difference; 4) head-to-head number of goals scored; 5) goal difference.

11 January 2016; 11:00	Report	Croatia	3–29	Spain	Kombank Arena, Belgrade; Referees: Diana Dutilh-Dumas (NED), Ursula Wengenroth (SUI)
11 January 2016; 11:00	Report	Score by quarters: 0–8, 2–8, 0–5, 1–8			Kombank Arena, Belgrade; Referees: Diana Dutilh-Dumas (NED), Ursula Wengenroth (SUI)
11 January 2016; 11:00	Report	three players 1	Goals	C. Espar, Pareja 5	Kombank Arena, Belgrade; Referees: Diana Dutilh-Dumas (NED), Ursula Wengenroth (SUI)

11 January 2016; 12:30	Report	Italy	10–3	France	Kombank Arena, Belgrade; Referees: Haldun Toygarlı (TUR), Matan Schwartz (ISR)
11 January 2016; 12:30	Report	Score by quarters: 2–2, 4–1, 1–0, 3–0			Kombank Arena, Belgrade; Referees: Haldun Toygarlı (TUR), Matan Schwartz (ISR)
11 January 2016; 12:30	Report	Bianconi 3	Goals	Jašková 2	Kombank Arena, Belgrade; Referees: Haldun Toygarlı (TUR), Matan Schwartz (ISR)

11 January 2016; 17:15	Report	Serbia	13–14	Germany	Kombank Arena, Belgrade; Referees: Luís Santos (POR), Irakli Kikalishvili (GEO)
11 January 2016; 17:15	Report	Score by quarters: 5–3, 1–3, 4–4, 3–4			Kombank Arena, Belgrade; Referees: Luís Santos (POR), Irakli Kikalishvili (GEO)
11 January 2016; 17:15	Report	Vuković 4	Goals	Blomenkamp 4	Kombank Arena, Belgrade; Referees: Luís Santos (POR), Irakli Kikalishvili (GEO)

13 January 2016; 11:00	Report	Spain	21–2	France	Kombank Arena, Belgrade; Referees: Martina Kuníková (SVK), Adrian Alexandrescu (ROU)
13 January 2016; 11:00	Report	Score by quarters: 5–1, 6–0, 4–0, 6–1			Kombank Arena, Belgrade; Referees: Martina Kuníková (SVK), Adrian Alexandrescu (ROU)
13 January 2016; 11:00	Report	García 4	Goals	Clerc, Daule 2	Kombank Arena, Belgrade; Referees: Martina Kuníková (SVK), Adrian Alexandrescu (ROU)

13 January 2016; 12:30	Report	Germany	3–22	Italy	Kombank Arena, Belgrade; Referees: Ursula Wengenroth (SUI), Diana Dutilh-Dumas (NED)
13 January 2016; 12:30	Report	Score by quarters: 0–5, 1–5, 1–6, 1–6			Kombank Arena, Belgrade; Referees: Ursula Wengenroth (SUI), Diana Dutilh-Dumas (NED)
13 January 2016; 12:30	Report	three players 1	Goals	five players 3	Kombank Arena, Belgrade; Referees: Ursula Wengenroth (SUI), Diana Dutilh-Dumas (NED)

13 January 2016; 17:15	Report	Croatia	4–8	Serbia	Kombank Arena, Belgrade; Referees: Sergey Naumov (RUS), György Kun (HUN)
13 January 2016; 17:15	Report	Score by quarters: 3–1, 0–2, 1–3, 0–2			Kombank Arena, Belgrade; Referees: Sergey Naumov (RUS), György Kun (HUN)
13 January 2016; 17:15	Report	Miljkovic 2	Goals	Vuković 4	Kombank Arena, Belgrade; Referees: Sergey Naumov (RUS), György Kun (HUN)

15 January 2016; 11:00	Report	Italy	31–2	Croatia	Kombank Arena, Belgrade; Referees: Martina Kuníková (SVK), Haldun Toygarlı (TUR)
15 January 2016; 11:00	Report	Score by quarters: 8–0, 7–0, 8–1, 8–1			Kombank Arena, Belgrade; Referees: Martina Kuníková (SVK), Haldun Toygarlı (TUR)
15 January 2016; 11:00	Report	Bianconi 6	Goals	Butic, Lordan 1	Kombank Arena, Belgrade; Referees: Martina Kuníková (SVK), Haldun Toygarlı (TUR)

15 January 2016; 12:30	Report	France	12–3	Germany	Kombank Arena, Belgrade; Referees: György Kun (HUN), Georgios Stavridis (GRE)
15 January 2016; 12:30	Report	Score by quarters: 2–0, 3–2, 4–0, 3–1			Kombank Arena, Belgrade; Referees: György Kun (HUN), Georgios Stavridis (GRE)
15 January 2016; 12:30	Report	Millot 3	Goals	three players 1	Kombank Arena, Belgrade; Referees: György Kun (HUN), Georgios Stavridis (GRE)

15 January 2016; 15:45	Report	Serbia	6–21	Spain	Kombank Arena, Belgrade; Referees: Diana Dutilh-Dumas (NED), Mario Dalli (MLT)
15 January 2016; 15:45	Report	Score by quarters: 0–6, 4–5, 1–4, 1–6			Kombank Arena, Belgrade; Referees: Diana Dutilh-Dumas (NED), Mario Dalli (MLT)
15 January 2016; 15:45	Report	Rudic, Vuković 2	Goals	García 4	Kombank Arena, Belgrade; Referees: Diana Dutilh-Dumas (NED), Mario Dalli (MLT)

17 January 2016; 11:00	Report	Croatia	3–14	France	Kombank Arena, Belgrade; Referees: Diana Dutilh-Dumas (NED), Sergey Naumov (RUS)
17 January 2016; 11:00	Report	Score by quarters: 1–5, 1–3, 0–3, 1–3			Kombank Arena, Belgrade; Referees: Diana Dutilh-Dumas (NED), Sergey Naumov (RUS)
17 January 2016; 11:00	Report	Brnas 2	Goals	Bachelier 4	Kombank Arena, Belgrade; Referees: Diana Dutilh-Dumas (NED), Sergey Naumov (RUS)

17 January 2016; 12:30	Report	Spain	26–3	Germany	Kombank Arena, Belgrade; Referees: Haldun Toygarlı (TUR), Ursula Wengenroth (SUI)
17 January 2016; 12:30	Report	Score by quarters: 5–0, 6–1, 8–2, 7–0			Kombank Arena, Belgrade; Referees: Haldun Toygarlı (TUR), Ursula Wengenroth (SUI)
17 January 2016; 12:30	Report	A. Espar 5	Goals	three players 1	Kombank Arena, Belgrade; Referees: Haldun Toygarlı (TUR), Ursula Wengenroth (SUI)

17 January 2016; 15:45	Report	Serbia	3–19	Italy	Kombank Arena, Belgrade; Referees: Martina Kuníková (SVK), Irakli Kikalishvili (GEO)
17 January 2016; 15:45	Report	Score by quarters: 1–6, 1–4, 1–7, 0–2			Kombank Arena, Belgrade; Referees: Martina Kuníková (SVK), Irakli Kikalishvili (GEO)
17 January 2016; 15:45	Report	three players 1	Goals	Emmolo 4	Kombank Arena, Belgrade; Referees: Martina Kuníková (SVK), Irakli Kikalishvili (GEO)

19 January 2016; 12:30	Report	Croatia	9–20	Germany	Kombank Arena, Belgrade; Referees: Martina Kuníková (SVK), Mario Dalli (MLT)
19 January 2016; 12:30	Report	Score by quarters: 0–6, 5–3, 3–6, 1–5			Kombank Arena, Belgrade; Referees: Martina Kuníková (SVK), Mario Dalli (MLT)
19 January 2016; 12:30	Report	Lordan, Miljkovic 2	Goals	Blomenkamp 8	Kombank Arena, Belgrade; Referees: Martina Kuníková (SVK), Mario Dalli (MLT)

19 January 2016; 15:45	Report	Italy	9–8	Spain	Kombank Arena, Belgrade; Referees: Stanko Ivanovski (MNE), Mark Koganov (AZE)
19 January 2016; 15:45	Report	Score by quarters: 4–3, 2–2, 2–1, 1–2			Kombank Arena, Belgrade; Referees: Stanko Ivanovski (MNE), Mark Koganov (AZE)
19 January 2016; 15:45	Report	Di Mario, Emmolo 3	Goals	López 3	Kombank Arena, Belgrade; Referees: Stanko Ivanovski (MNE), Mark Koganov (AZE)

19 January 2016; 17:15	Report	France	7–6	Serbia	Kombank Arena, Belgrade; Referees: Georgios Stavridis (GRE), Ursula Wengenroth (SUI)
19 January 2016; 17:15	Report	Score by quarters: 2–3, 0–0, 3–1, 2–2			Kombank Arena, Belgrade; Referees: Georgios Stavridis (GRE), Ursula Wengenroth (SUI)
19 January 2016; 17:15	Report	Sacré 2	Goals	Luka 3	Kombank Arena, Belgrade; Referees: Georgios Stavridis (GRE), Ursula Wengenroth (SUI)

== Final round ==
Championship bracket

Quarterfinals
Netherlands	19
Germany	2
Russia	8
Spain	12
Hungary	18
France	6
Greece	4
Italy	10

Semifinals
Netherlands	15
Spain	14
Hungary	10
Italy	5

Gold medal match
Netherlands	7
Hungary	9
Bronze medal match
Spain	9
Italy	10

5th place bracket

5th–8th place classification
Germany	2
Russia	22
France	6
Greece	12

5th place match
Russia	12
Greece	13
7th place match
Germany	9
France	13

=== Quarterfinals ===
All times are CET (UTC+1).

20 January 2016; 12:00	Report	Greece	4–10	Italy	Kombank Arena, Belgrade; Referees: Mario Dalli (MLT), Xavier Buch (ESP)
20 January 2016; 12:00	Report	Score by quarters: 0–1, 0–3, 2–2, 2–4			Kombank Arena, Belgrade; Referees: Mario Dalli (MLT), Xavier Buch (ESP)
20 January 2016; 12:00	Report	Roumpesi 3	Goals	Di Mario, Radicchi 3	Kombank Arena, Belgrade; Referees: Mario Dalli (MLT), Xavier Buch (ESP)

20 January 2016; 13:30	Report	Netherlands	19–2	Germany	Kombank Arena, Belgrade; Referees: Alessandro Severo (ITA), Haldun Toygarlı (TUR)
20 January 2016; 13:30	Report	Score by quarters: 8–0, 3–1, 5–0, 3–1			Kombank Arena, Belgrade; Referees: Alessandro Severo (ITA), Haldun Toygarlı (TUR)
20 January 2016; 13:30	Report	Stomphorst 5	Goals	Blomenkamp 2	Kombank Arena, Belgrade; Referees: Alessandro Severo (ITA), Haldun Toygarlı (TUR)

20 January 2016; 15:45	Report	Hungary	18–6	France	Kombank Arena, Belgrade; Referees: Diana Dutilh-Dumas (NED), Martina Kuníková (SVK)
20 January 2016; 15:45	Report	Score by quarters: 6–1, 5–3, 2–2, 5–0			Kombank Arena, Belgrade; Referees: Diana Dutilh-Dumas (NED), Martina Kuníková (SVK)
20 January 2016; 15:45	Report	three players 3	Goals	six players 1	Kombank Arena, Belgrade; Referees: Diana Dutilh-Dumas (NED), Martina Kuníková (SVK)

20 January 2016; 17:15	Report	Russia	8–12	Spain	Kombank Arena, Belgrade; Referees: György Kun (HUN), Matan Schwartz (ISR)
20 January 2016; 17:15	Report	Score by quarters: 2–2, 0–5, 2–1, 4–4			Kombank Arena, Belgrade; Referees: György Kun (HUN), Matan Schwartz (ISR)
20 January 2016; 17:15	Report	Lisunova 3	Goals	A. Espar 3	Kombank Arena, Belgrade; Referees: György Kun (HUN), Matan Schwartz (ISR)

=== 5th–8th place classification ===
All times are CET (UTC+1).

21 January 2016; 12:00	Report	France	6–12	Greece	Kombank Arena, Belgrade; Referees: Vojin Putniković (SRB), Luís Santos (POR)
21 January 2016; 12:00	Report	Score by quarters: 1–2, 1–5, 3–2, 1–3			Kombank Arena, Belgrade; Referees: Vojin Putniković (SRB), Luís Santos (POR)
21 January 2016; 12:00	Report	Tardy 3	Goals	Avramidou 3	Kombank Arena, Belgrade; Referees: Vojin Putniković (SRB), Luís Santos (POR)

21 January 2016; 13:30	Report	Germany	2–22	Russia	Kombank Arena, Belgrade; Referees: Diana Dutilh-Dumas (NED), Ursula Wengenroth (SUI)
21 January 2016; 13:30	Report	Score by quarters: 0–7, 1–5, 1–6, 0–4			Kombank Arena, Belgrade; Referees: Diana Dutilh-Dumas (NED), Ursula Wengenroth (SUI)
21 January 2016; 13:30	Report	Kern, Seyfert 1	Goals	Simanovich 6	Kombank Arena, Belgrade; Referees: Diana Dutilh-Dumas (NED), Ursula Wengenroth (SUI)

=== Semifinals ===
All times are CET (UTC+1).

21 January 2016; 15:45	Report	Netherlands	15–14 (PSO)	Spain	Kombank Arena, Belgrade; Referees: Mario Dalli (MLT), Dragan Štampalija (CRO)
21 January 2016; 15:45	Report	Score by quarters: 4–3, 2–3, 2–1, 1–2 PSO: 6–5			Kombank Arena, Belgrade; Referees: Mario Dalli (MLT), Dragan Štampalija (CRO)
21 January 2016; 15:45	Report	Smit, Van der Sloot 2	Goals	Tarragó 3	Kombank Arena, Belgrade; Referees: Mario Dalli (MLT), Dragan Štampalija (CRO)

21 January 2016; 17:15	Report	Hungary	10–5	Italy	Kombank Arena, Belgrade; Referees: Adrian Alexandrescu (ROU), Mark Koganov (AZE)
21 January 2016; 17:15	Report	Score by quarters: 2–1, 3–2, 3–0, 2–2			Kombank Arena, Belgrade; Referees: Adrian Alexandrescu (ROU), Mark Koganov (AZE)
21 January 2016; 17:15	Report	Illés 3	Goals	Garibotti 2	Kombank Arena, Belgrade; Referees: Adrian Alexandrescu (ROU), Mark Koganov (AZE)

=== 11th place match ===
All times are CET (UTC+1).

22 January 2016; 12:00	Report	Turkey	4–12	Croatia	Kombank Arena, Belgrade; Referees: Irakli Kikalishvili (GEO), Luís Santos (POR)
22 January 2016; 12:00	Report	Score by quarters: 1–1, 0–4, 1–2, 2–5			Kombank Arena, Belgrade; Referees: Irakli Kikalishvili (GEO), Luís Santos (POR)
22 January 2016; 12:00	Report	Kus 2	Goals	Bukic 3	Kombank Arena, Belgrade; Referees: Irakli Kikalishvili (GEO), Luís Santos (POR)

=== 9th place match ===
All times are CET (UTC+1).

22 January 2016; 13:30	Report	Portugal	6–9	Serbia	Kombank Arena, Belgrade; Referees: Ursula Wengenroth (SUI), Xavier Buch (ESP)
22 January 2016; 13:30	Report	Score by quarters: 1–3, 3–3, 0–2, 2–1			Kombank Arena, Belgrade; Referees: Ursula Wengenroth (SUI), Xavier Buch (ESP)
22 January 2016; 13:30	Report	Nunes, Sarmento 2	Goals	three players 2	Kombank Arena, Belgrade; Referees: Ursula Wengenroth (SUI), Xavier Buch (ESP)

=== 7th place match ===
All times are CET (UTC+1).

22 January 2016; 15:45	Report	Germany	9–13	France	Kombank Arena, Belgrade; Referees: Diana Dutilh-Dumas (NED), Matan Schwartz (ISR)
22 January 2016; 15:45	Report	Score by quarters: 4–2, 2–6, 3–3, 0–2			Kombank Arena, Belgrade; Referees: Diana Dutilh-Dumas (NED), Matan Schwartz (ISR)
22 January 2016; 15:45	Report	Gelse, Vosseberg 3	Goals	Bachelier, Guillet 3	Kombank Arena, Belgrade; Referees: Diana Dutilh-Dumas (NED), Matan Schwartz (ISR)

=== 5th place match ===
All times are CET (UTC+1).

22 January 2016; 17:15	Report	Russia	12–13 (PSO)	Greece	Kombank Arena, Belgrade; Referees: Adrian Alexandrescu (ROU), Radosław Koryzna (POL)
22 January 2016; 17:15	Report	Score by quarters: 3–2, 4–3, 2–2, 0–2 PSO: 3–4			Kombank Arena, Belgrade; Referees: Adrian Alexandrescu (ROU), Radosław Koryzna (POL)
22 January 2016; 17:15	Report	Lisunova 4	Goals	E. Plevritou 3	Kombank Arena, Belgrade; Referees: Adrian Alexandrescu (ROU), Radosław Koryzna (POL)

=== Bronze medal match ===
All times are CET (UTC+1).

22 January 2016; 18:45	Report	Spain	9–10	Italy	Kombank Arena, Belgrade; Referees: György Kun (HUN), Georgios Stavridis (GRE)
22 January 2016; 18:45	Report	Score by quarters: 3–2, 2–2, 2–4, 2–2			Kombank Arena, Belgrade; Referees: György Kun (HUN), Georgios Stavridis (GRE)
22 January 2016; 18:45	Report	Tarragó 3 B. Ortiz, Peña 2 Pareja, García 1	Goals	Bianconi 3 Tabani, Queirolo, Di Mario, Emmolo, Frassinetti, Pomeri, Cotti 1	Kombank Arena, Belgrade; Referees: György Kun (HUN), Georgios Stavridis (GRE)

=== Gold medal match ===
All times are CET (UTC+1).

22 January 2016; 20:15	Report	Netherlands	7–9	Hungary	Kombank Arena, Belgrade; Referees: Sergey Naumov (RUS), Vojin Putniković (SRB)
22 January 2016; 20:15	Report	Score by quarters: 3–3, 2–1, 2–3, 0–2			Kombank Arena, Belgrade; Referees: Sergey Naumov (RUS), Vojin Putniković (SRB)
22 January 2016; 20:15	Report	D. Genee 3 Smit 2 Van der Sloot, Megens 1	Goals	Kistekeki, Tóth, Bujka 2 Antal, Takacs, Illés 1	Kombank Arena, Belgrade; Referees: Sergey Naumov (RUS), Vojin Putniković (SRB)

== Final ranking ==
Rank	Team
1st place, gold medalist(s)	Hungary
2nd place, silver medalist(s)	Netherlands
3rd place, bronze medalist(s)	Italy
4	Spain
5	Greece
6	Russia
7	France
8	Germany
9	Serbia
10	Portugal
11	Croatia
12	Turkey

Qualified for the Summer Olympics
Qualified for the Summer Olympics qualification tournament

2016 Women's European Water Polo champion

Hungary
Third title

Team Roster

Edina Gangl, Dóra Czigány, Dóra Antal, Hanna Kisteleki, Gabriella Szűcs, Orsolya Takács, Anna Illés, Rita Keszthelyi (C), Ildikó Tóth, Barbara Bujka, Dóra Csabai, Krisztina Garda, Orsolya Kasó. Head coach: Attila Bíró

== Awards and statistics ==
=== Top goalscorers ===
Rank	Name	Goals	Shots	%
1	(Hungary) Rita Keszthelyi	23	39	59
2	(Italy) Roberta Bianconi	21	43	49
3	(Netherlands) Yasemin Smit	20	37	54
3	(Russia) Ekaterina Lisunova	20	36	57
5	(Greece) Alexandra Asimaki	19	43	44
5	(Hungary) Barbara Bujka	19	35	54
5	(Russia) Anastasia Simanovich	19	34	56
8	(Germany) Claudia Blomenkamp	18	41	44
8	(Hungary) Hanna Kisteleki	18	27	67
8	(Netherlands) Vivian Sevenich	18	34	53
8	(Spain) Roser Tarragó	18	38	47

Source: wpbelgrade2016.microplustiming.com

== Individual awards ==
- Most Valuable Player
  - Yasemin Smit (NED)
- Best Goalkeeper
  - Edina Gangl (HUN)
- Top Scorer
  - Rita Keszthelyi (HUN) — 23 goals
