= Chiara Tabani =

Italian water polo player (born 1994)

Personal information
- Nationality: Italian
- Born: 27 August 1994 (age 31) Prato, Italy
- Height: 1.75 m (5 ft 9 in)
- Weight: 75 kg (165 lb)

Sport
- Country: Italy
- Sport: Water polo
Medal record
Olympic Games
Silver medal – second place	2016 Rio de Janeiro	Team
World Championships
Bronze medal – third place	2015 Kazan	Team
Bronze medal – third place	2023 Fukuoka	Team
European Championships
Bronze medal – third place	2016 Belgrade
Bronze medal – third place	2022 Split

Chiara Tabani (born 27 August 1994) is an Italian water polo player. She qualified for the 2024 Summer Olympics.

She was part of the Italian team winning the bronze medal at the 2015 World Aquatics Championships, where she played in the centre back position. She won a silver medal at the 2016 Summer Olympics.

== See also ==
- List of Olympic medalists in water polo (women)
- List of World Aquatics Championships medalists in water polo
