= Arianna Garibotti =

Italian water polo player

Personal information
- Nationality: Italian
- Born: 9 December 1989 (age 36) Genoa, Italy
- Height: 1.69 m (5 ft 7 in)
- Weight: 64 kg (141 lb)

Sport
- Country: Italy
- Sport: Water polo
Medal record
Olympic Games
Silver medal – second place	2016 Rio de Janeiro	Team
World Championships
Bronze medal – third place	2015 Kazan	Team
European Championships
Silver medal – second place	2006 Belgrade
Bronze medal – third place	2016 Belgrade

Arianna Garibotti (born 9 December 1989) is an Italian water polo player. She was part of the Italian team winning the bronze medal at the 2015 World Aquatics Championships, where she played in the centre back position.

== See also ==
- List of Olympic medalists in water polo (women)
- List of World Aquatics Championships medalists in water polo
