= Federica Radicchi =

Italian water polo player

Personal information
- Nationality: Italian
- Born: 21 December 1988 (age 37) Rome, Italy
- Height: 1.70 m (5 ft 7 in)
- Weight: 70 kg (154 lb)

Sport
- Country: Italy
- Sport: Water polo
Medal record
Olympic Games
Silver medal – second place	2016 Rio de Janeiro	Team
World Championships
Bronze medal – third place	2015 Kazan	Team
European Championships
Silver medal – second place	2006 Belgrade
Bronze medal – third place	2016 Belgrade

Federica Radicchi (born 21 December 1988) is an Italian water polo player.

== Career ==
She competed at the 2012 Summer Olympics and the 2016 Summer Olympics. She was part of the Italian team winning the bronze medal at the 2015 World Aquatics Championships, where she played in the centre forward position.

== See also ==
- List of Olympic medalists in water polo (women)
- List of World Aquatics Championships medalists in water polo
