= Samantha Hill (water polo) =

American water polo player (born 1992)

Samantha Nan Sieni Hill
Personal information
- Born: June 8, 1992 (age 34) Honolulu, Hawaii, United States
- Height: 183 cm (6 ft 0 in)
- Weight: 89 kg (196 lb)

Sport
- Country: United States
- Sport: Water polo
- Position: goalkeeper
- College team: University of California Los Angeles
- Club: Santa Barbara Water Polo Foundation
- Coached by: Adam Krikorian (UCLA, '16 Olympics)
Medal record
Olympic Games
Gold medal – first place	2016 Rio de Janeiro	Team
World Championships
Gold medal – first place	2015 Kazan	Team
Pan American Games
Gold medal – first place	2015 Toronto	Team

Samantha "Sami" Nan Sieni Hill (born June 8, 1992) is an American water polo player who represented the United States winning the gold medal at the 2016 Summer Olympics in the Women's Olympic water polo competition in Rio de Janeiro, where she played in the goalkeeper position.

== Early life ==
Hill was born June 8, 1992, in Honolulu, Hawaii to Cynthia and William Hill, the oldest of four siblings with two younger sisters Kodi and Abbie and a younger brother. She attended Dos Pueblos High School in Goleta, part of greater Newport Beach, California, where she graduated in 2011. Playing for Dos Pueblos High in February 2009, Hill made 17 saves as goalie against Corona del Mar for a victory of 3–2, winning the CIF Southern Section Championship. As a starting goalie, Hill again led Dos Pueblos High to the CIF section title in 2010. In summary, Hill played as a member of the varsity water polo team which won a total of three CIF titles, two which were Division 1, and one which was at the level of Division 2. When she was a High School Senior Sos Pueblos had a record of 31-0 and as previously noted, captured first place at the Division 1 CIF championship.

== University of California Los Angeles ==
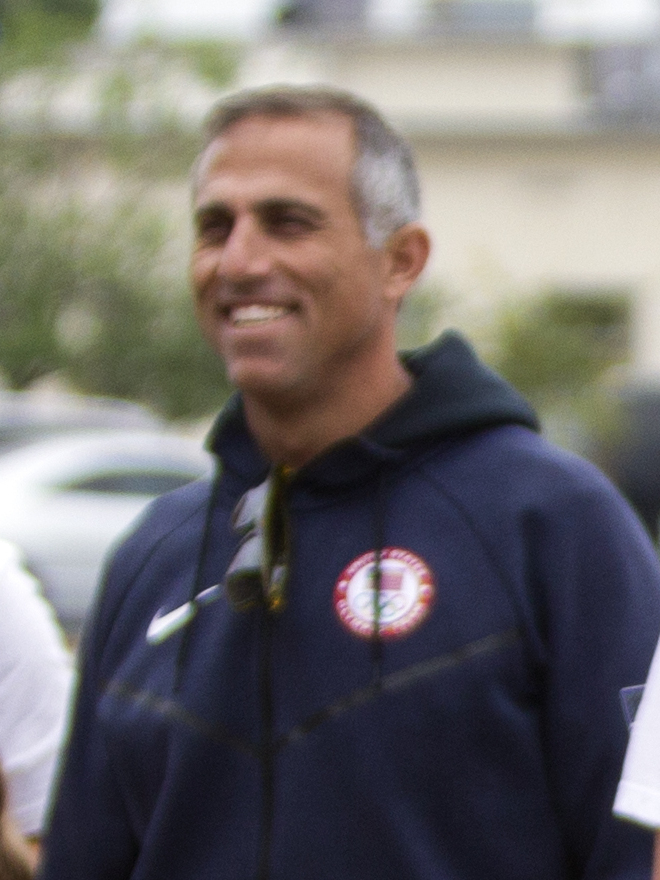
UCLA Coach A. Krikorian, 2018

Hill attended the University of California, Los Angeles, from around 2011-2015 where she played Water Polo for Hall of Fame Coach Adam Krikorian, making All-American as a goalkeeper. Having an immediate impact as a UCLA Freshman, Hill received All-MPSF Newcomer honors in her first full year of play. In 2013, she helped guide UCLA to a third place NCAA Tournament finish, making 314 saves that season. In both 2014 and 2015, she guided the Bruins to the NCAA Championship match, where the team finished as runner-ups both years. She did not compete for UCLA as a sophomore, taking off time to train with the U.S. National Team. Samantha graduated UCLA in 2015, with a major in history.

Her younger sister Kodi would also play water polo for Dos Pueblos High, UCLA and TeamUSA.

In international competition, Hill was part of the U.S. Women's national team coached by Krikorian, that won a gold medal at the 2015 World Aquatics Championships in Kazan, where she played in the goalkeeper position. She was also part of the gold medal-winning American teams at the 2015 Pan American Games held in Toronto, Canada.

== 2016 Rio Olympic gold medal ==
At the 2016 Olympics in Rio de Janeiro, Hill was part of the U.S. team that won the gold medal at the Women's Olympic Water polo competition under the management of U.S. Olympic Women's Water Polo Head Coach Adam Krikorian. The American women's team, defending their 2012 gold medal, captured the gold for a second consecutive Olympics with a strong 12–5 victory over Italy, who had performed well in the preliminary rounds. The U.S. women's team became the only competitor that had received a medal in all five Olympic women's water polo tournaments. Russia took home the bronze medal by defeating Hungary, a dominant international team.

== See also ==
- United States women's Olympic water polo team records and statistics
- List of Olympic champions in women's water polo
- List of Olympic medalists in water polo (women)
- List of women's Olympic water polo tournament goalkeepers
- List of world champions in women's water polo
- List of World Aquatics Championships medalists in water polo
