= Aleksandra Cotti =

Italian water polo player

Personal information
- Nationality: Italian
- Born: 13 December 1988 (age 37) San Giovanni in Persiceto, Bologna
- Height: 1.67 m (5 ft 6 in)
- Weight: 65 kg (143 lb)

Sport
- Country: Italy
- Sport: Water polo
Medal record
Olympic Games
| Silver medal – second place | 2016 Rio de Janeiro | Team |

Aleksandra Cotti (born 13 December 1988 in San Giovanni in Persiceto, Bologna) is an Italian water polo player. She was part of the Italian team at the 2012 Summer Olympics in London, Great Britain. The team won the silver medal at the 2016 Summer Olympics. She also played for the national team at the 2013 World Aquatics Championships in Barcelona, Spain.

== See also ==
- List of Olympic medalists in water polo (women)
