= Water polo at the 2013 World Aquatics Championships – Women's team rosters =

These are the rosters of all participating teams at the women's water polo tournament at the 2013 World Aquatics Championships in Piscines Bernat Picornell, Barcelona, Spain from 21 July–2 August.

== Group A ==
=== Netherlands ===
- Ilse van der Meijden
- Yasemin Smit
- Marloes Nijhuis
- Biurakn Hakhverdian
- Sabrina van der Sloot
- Nomi Stomphorst
- Iefke van Belkum
- Vivian Sevenich
- Carolina Slagter
- Dagmar Genee
- Lieke Klaassen
- Leonie van der Molen
- Anne Heinis

=== Russia ===
- Anna Ustyukhina
- Diana Antonova
- Ekaterina Prokofyeva
- Elvina Karimova
- Alexandra Antonova
- Olga Belova
- Ekaterina Tankeeva
- Anna Grineva
- Anna Timofeeva
- Olga Beliaeva
- Evgeniya Ivanova
- Ekaterina Zelentsova
- Anna Karnaukh

=== Spain ===
- Marta Bach
- Andrea Blas
- Anna Espar
- Laura Ester
- Maica García Godoy
- Patricia Herrera
- Laura López
- Ona Meseguer
- Lorena Miranda
- Matilde Ortiz
- Jennifer Pareja
- Pilar Peña Carrasco
- Roser Tarragó

=== Uzbekistan ===
- Elena Dukhanova
- Diana Dadabaeva
- Aleksandra Sarancha
- Angelina Djumalieva
- Evgeniya Ivanova
- Ekaterina Morozova
- Natalya Plyusova
- Anna Shcheglova
- Ramilya Halikova
- Adelina Zinurova
- Guzelya Hamitova
- Anna Plyusova
- Natalya Shlyonskaya

== Group B ==
=== Australia ===
- Lea Barta
- Jayde Appel
- Hannah Buckling
- Holly Lincoln-Smith
- Isobel Bishop
- Bronwen Knox
- Rowena Webster
- Glencora Ralph
- Zoe Arancini
- Ashleigh Southern
- Keesja Gofers
- Nicola Zagame
- Kelsey Wakefield

=== China ===
- Yang Jun
- Teng Fei
- Liu Ping
- Sun Yujun
- He Jin
- Sun Yating
- Song Donglun
- Xu Lu
- Mei Xiaohan
- Ma Huanhuan
- Zhang Cong
- Xia Qun
- Wang Ying

=== New Zealand ===
- Brooke Millar
- Emily Cox
- Kelly Mason
- Nicole Lewis
- Alexandra Boyd
- Lynlee Smith
- Sarah Landry
- Danielle Lewis
- Lauren Sieprath
- Casie Bowry
- Kirsten Hudson
- Alexandra Myles
- Ianeta Hutchinson

=== South Africa ===
- Anke Jacobs
- Kimberly Schmidt
- Kieran Paley
- Christy Rawstron
- Megan Schooling
- Tarryn Schooling
- Kimberly Kay
- Lee-Anne Keet
- Delaine Christian
- Marcelle Keet
- Lindsay Killeen
- Kelsey White
- Thembelihle Mkize

== Group C ==
=== Canada ===
- Krystina Alogbo
- Sophie Baron La Salle
- Joelle Bekhazi
- Nicola Colterjohn
- Carmen Eggens
- Monika Eggens
- Katrina Monton
- Dominique Perreault
- Marina Radu
- Michele Relton
- Christine Robinson
- Stephanie Valin
- Emma Wright

=== Greece ===
- Eleni Kouvdou
- Christina Tsoukala
- Vasiliki Diamantopoulou
- Ilektra Psouni
- Margarita Plevritou
- Alkisti Avramidou
- Alexandra Asimaki
- Antigoni Roumpesi
- Christina Kotsia
- Triantafyllia Manolioudaki
- Eleftheria Plevritou
- Alkistis Benekou
- Chrysoula Diamantopoulou

=== Great Britain ===
Team roster

- Rosemary Morris
- Chloe Wilcox
- Fiona McCann
- Ciara Gibson-Byrne
- Aine Hoy
- Claire Nixon
- Lisa Gibson
- Hazel Musgrove
- Peggy Etiebet
- Angela Winstanley-Smith
- Francesca Clayton
- Kathryn Fowler
- Jade Smith

=== United States ===
- Elizabeth Armstrong
- Lauren Silver
- Melissa Seidemann
- Rachel Fattal
- Caroline Clark
- Maggie Steffens
- Courtney Mathewson
- Kiley Neushul
- Jillian Kraus
- Kelly Rulon
- Annika Dries
- Kami Craig
- Tumua Anae

== Group D ==
=== Brazil ===
- Manuela Canetti
- Diana Abla
- Marina Zablith
- Marina Canetti
- Luciane Maia
- Adhara Santoro
- Melani Dias
- Izabela Chiappini
- Victoria Muratore
- Flávia Vigna
- Mirella Coutinho
- Viviane Bahia
- Victoria Chamorro

=== Hungary ===
- Flóra Bolonyai
- Orsolya Kasó
- Dóra Antal
- Barbara Bujka
- Krisztina Garda
- Anna Illés
- Rita Keszthelyi
- Dóra Kisteleki
- Katalin Menczinger
- Ibolya Kitti Miskolczi
- Gabriella Szűcs
- Orsolya Takács
- Ildikó Tóth

Coach: András Merész

=== Italy ===
- Elena Gigli
- Francesca Pomeri
- Arianna Garibotti
- Federica Radicchi
- Elisa Queirolo
- Rosaria Aiello
- Tania Di Mario
- Roberta Bianconi
- Giulia Enrica Emmolo
- Valeria Palmieri
- Aleksandra Cotti
- Teresa Frassinetti
- Loredana Sparano

=== Kazakhstan ===
- Alexandra Zharkova
- Natalya Shepelina
- Aizhan Akilbayeva
- Anna Turova
- Anastassiya Mirshina
- Anna Zubkova
- Natalya Alexandrova
- Yekaterina Glushkova
- Assel Jakayeva
- Marina Gritsenko
- Alexandra Rozhentseva
- Assem Mussarova
- Kristina Krassikova

== See also ==
- Water polo at the 2013 World Aquatics Championships – Men's team rosters
