= Water polo at the 2011 World Aquatics Championships – Women's team rosters =

These are the rosters of all participating teams at the women's water polo tournament at the 2011 World Aquatics Championships held between July 17–30 at the Shanghai Oriental Sports Center in Shanghai, China.

== Australia ==
No.	Name	Date of birth	L/R	Position	Height	Weight
1	Alicia McCormack	7 June 1983	R	goalkeeper	1.68 m (5 ft 6 in)	77 kg (170 lb)
2	Gemma Jane Beadsworth	17 July 1987	R	field player	1.80 m (5 ft 11 in)	80 kg (180 lb)
3	Sophie Elizabeth Smith	26 February 1986	R	field player	1.81 m (5 ft 11 in)	70 kg (150 lb)
4	Rebecca Marie Rippon	26 December 1978	R	field player	1.67 m (5 ft 6 in)	72 kg (159 lb)
5	Jane Moran	6 June 1985	R	field player	1.67 m (5 ft 6 in)	68 kg (150 lb)
6	Bronwen Knox	16 April 1986	R	field player	1.82 m (6 ft 0 in)	90 kg (200 lb)
7	Rowena Evelyn Webster	27 December 1987	R	field player	1.77 m (5 ft 10 in)	79 kg (174 lb)
8	Kate Maree Gynther	5 July 1982	R	field player	1.74 m (5 ft 9 in)	73 kg (161 lb)
9	Glencora Ralph	8 August 1988	R	field player	1.78 m (5 ft 10 in)	68 kg (150 lb)
10	Holly Jane Lincoln Smith	26 March 1988	R	field player	1.83 m (6 ft 0 in)	85 kg (187 lb)
11	Melissa Alison Rippon	20 January 1981	R	field player	1.69 m (5 ft 7 in)	71 kg (157 lb)
12	Nicola Maree Zagame	11 August 1990	R	field player	1.74 m (5 ft 9 in)	75 kg (165 lb)
13	Victoria Jayne Brown	27 July 1985	R	goalkeeper	1.83 m (6 ft 0 in)	77 kg (170 lb)

== Brazil ==
No.	Name	Date of birth	L/R	Position	Height	Weight
1	Tess Oliveira	6 January 1987	R	goalkeeper	1.65 m (5 ft 5 in)	60 kg (130 lb)
2	Cecilia Canetti	16 January 1987	R	field player	1.76 m (5 ft 9 in)	63 kg (139 lb)
3	Marina Zablith	4 March 1987	R	field player	1.79 m (5 ft 10 in)	76 kg (168 lb)
4	Marina Canetti	24 January 1983	R	field player	1.70 m (5 ft 7 in)	66 kg (146 lb)
5	Mirella Coutinho	5 October 1994	R	field player	1.73 m (5 ft 8 in)	68 kg (150 lb)
6	Izabella Chiappini	28 September 1995	R	field player	1.66 m (5 ft 5 in)	51 kg (112 lb)
7	Cristina Beer	22 November 1980	R	field player	1.65 m (5 ft 5 in)	58 kg (128 lb)
8	Luiza Carvalho	2 July 1983	R	field player	1.78 m (5 ft 10 in)	79 kg (174 lb)
9	Fernanda Lissoni	31 August 1980	R	field player	1.68 m (5 ft 6 in)	65 kg (143 lb)
10	Gabriela Gozani	5 August 1991	L	field player	1.68 m (5 ft 6 in)	70 kg (150 lb)
11	Maria Barbara Amaro	7 February 1986	R	field player	1.78 m (5 ft 10 in)	75 kg (165 lb)
12	Gabriela Dias	28 October 1991	R	field player	1.75 m (5 ft 9 in)	84 kg (185 lb)
13	Manuela Canetti	26 December 1988	R	goalkeeper	1.77 m (5 ft 10 in)	66 kg (146 lb)

== Canada ==
No.	Name	Date of birth	L/R	Position	Height	Weight
1	Rachel Riddell	5 September 1984	R	goalkeeper	1.78 m (5 ft 10 in)	68 kg (150 lb)
2	Krystina Alogbo	20 January 1986	R	field player	1.65 m (5 ft 5 in)	78 kg (172 lb)
3	Katrina Monton	23 September 1987	R	field player	1.73 m (5 ft 8 in)	78 kg (172 lb)
4	Emily Jean Csikos	29 July 1988	R	field player	1.75 m (5 ft 9 in)	69 kg (152 lb)
5	Joelle Bekhazi	27 April 1987	R	field player	1.70 m (5 ft 7 in)	66 kg (146 lb)
6	Whitney Rae Genoway	13 March 1986	L	field player	1.70 m (5 ft 7 in)	71 kg (157 lb)
7	Stephanie Valin	6 July 1987	R	field player	1.73 m (5 ft 8 in)	76 kg (168 lb)
8	Dominique Perreault	26 October 1984	L	field player	1.78 m (5 ft 10 in)	64 kg (141 lb)
9	Monika Eggens		R	field player		
10	Christine Robinson	17 May 1984	R	field player	1.83 m (6 ft 0 in)	84 kg (185 lb)
11	Tara Campbell	21 July 1983	R	field player	1.83 m (6 ft 0 in)	77 kg (170 lb)
12	Marina Radu	5 September 1984	L	field player	1.80 m (5 ft 11 in)	73 kg (161 lb)
13	Marissa Janssens	9 September 1988	R	goalkeeper	1.75 m (5 ft 9 in)	66 kg (146 lb)

== China ==
No.	Name	Date of birth	L/R	Position	Height	Weight
1	Yang Jun	28 April 1988	L	goalkeeper	1.78 m (5 ft 10 in)	71 kg (157 lb)
2	Teng Fei	23 January 1988	R	field player	1.69 m (5 ft 7 in)	66 kg (146 lb)
3	Liu Ping	1 May 1987	R	field player	1.75 m (5 ft 9 in)	66 kg (146 lb)
4	Sun Yujun	30 January 1987	R	field player	1.68 m (5 ft 6 in)	66 kg (146 lb)
5	He Jin	3 May 1987	R	field player	1.79 m (5 ft 10 in)	100 kg (220 lb)
6	Sun Yating	24 February 1988	R	field player	1.81 m (5 ft 11 in)	81 kg (179 lb)
7	Song Donglun	28 April 1991	R	field player	1.77 m (5 ft 10 in)	78 kg (172 lb)
8	Chen Yuan	7 September 1989	R	field player	1.80 m (5 ft 11 in)	75 kg (165 lb)
9	Wang Yi	29 July 1987	L	field player	1.76 m (5 ft 9 in)	65 kg (143 lb)
10	Ma Huanhuan	13 January 1990	R	field player	1.77 m (5 ft 10 in)	65 kg (143 lb)
11	Sun Huizi	11 June 1990	R	field player	1.81 m (5 ft 11 in)	67 kg (148 lb)
12	Zhang Lei	9 May 1988	R	field player	1.70 m (5 ft 7 in)	65 kg (143 lb)
13	Wang Ying	17 August 1988	L	goalkeeper	1.82 m (6 ft 0 in)	77 kg (170 lb)

== Cuba ==
No.	Name	Date of birth	L/R	Position	Height	Weight
1	Mairelis Lisandra Zunzunegui Morgan	8 July 1986	R	goalkeeper	1.69 m (5 ft 7 in)	73 kg (161 lb)
2	Daniela Escalona Santos	4 July 1991	L	fieldplayer	1.67 m (5 ft 6 in)	71 kg (157 lb)
3	Yeliana Caridad Bravo Curro	8 September 1986	R	fieldplayer	1.78 m (5 ft 10 in)	86 kg (190 lb)
4	Hirovis Hernandez Consuegra	23 August 1979	R	fieldplayer	1.55 m (5 ft 1 in)	54 kg (119 lb)
5	Danay Gutierrez More	12 April 1982	R	fieldplayer	1.73 m (5 ft 8 in)	70 kg (150 lb)
6	Mayelin Bernal Villa	23 September 1989	R	fieldplayer	1.90 m (6 ft 3 in)	85 kg (187 lb)
7	Yanet Lopez Hernandez	12 September 1988	R	fieldplayer	1.71 m (5 ft 7 in)	74 kg (163 lb)
8	Yadira Oms Barroso	18 August 1984	R	fieldplayer	1.67 m (5 ft 6 in)	68 kg (150 lb)
9	Dayana Morales Marrero	15 March 1987	R	fieldplayer	1.77 m (5 ft 10 in)	83 kg (183 lb)
10	Yordanka Pujol Palacio	11 March 1990	R	fieldplayer	1.76 m (5 ft 9 in)	76 kg (168 lb)
11	Lisbeth Santana Sosa	21 December 1990	L	fieldplayer	1.81 m (5 ft 11 in)	78 kg (172 lb)
12	Neldys Truffin Abreu	24 December 1980	R	fieldplayer	1.76 m (5 ft 9 in)	75 kg (165 lb)
13	Arisney Ramos Betancourt	11 May 1989	R	goalkeeper	1.85 m (6 ft 1 in)	82 kg (181 lb)

== Greece ==
No.	Name	Date of birth	L/R	Position	Height	Weight
1	Eleni Kouvdou	9 August 1989	R	goalkeeper	1.75 m (5 ft 9 in)	67 kg (148 lb)
2	Christina Tsoukala	8 July 1991	R	field player	1.85 m (6 ft 1 in)	75 kg (165 lb)
3	Antiopi Melidoni	11 October 1977	R	field player	1.72 m (5 ft 8 in)	65 kg (143 lb)
4	Ilektra Psouni	12 September 1985	R	field player	1.70 m (5 ft 7 in)	60 kg (130 lb)
5	Kyriaki Liosi	30 October 1979	R	field player	1.70 m (5 ft 7 in)	63 kg (139 lb)
6	Alkisti Avramidou	26 February 1988	R	field player	1.70 m (5 ft 7 in)	62 kg (137 lb)
7	Alexandra Asimaki	28 June 1988	R	field player	1.70 m (5 ft 7 in)	64 kg (141 lb)
8	Antigoni Roumpesi	19 July 1983	L	field player	1.77 m (5 ft 10 in)	85 kg (187 lb)
9	Angeliki Gerolymou	22 June 1982	R	field player	1.68 m (5 ft 6 in)	71 kg (157 lb)
10	Triantafyllia Manolioudaki	19 March 1986	R	field player	1.70 m (5 ft 7 in)	62 kg (137 lb)
11	Stavroula Antonakou	2 May 1982	R	field player	1.75 m (5 ft 9 in)	60 kg (130 lb)
12	Georgia Lara	31 May 1980	R	field player	1.75 m (5 ft 9 in)	65 kg (143 lb)
13	Eleni Goula	18 August 1990	R	goalkeeper	1.80 m (5 ft 11 in)	68 kg (150 lb)

== Hungary ==
No.	Name	Date of birth	L/R	Position	Height	Weight
1	Orsolya Kaso	22 November 1988	R	goalkeeper	1.85 m (6 ft 1 in)	71 kg (157 lb)
2	Dora Czigany	23 October 1992	R	field player	1.70 m (5 ft 7 in)	61 kg (134 lb)
3	Dora Antal	9 September 1993	R	field player	1.68 m (5 ft 6 in)	60 kg (130 lb)
4	Anna Krisztina Illes	21 February 1994	R	field player	1.80 m (5 ft 11 in)	73 kg (161 lb)
5	Gabriella Szucs	7 March 1988	R	field player	1.83 m (6 ft 0 in)	74 kg (163 lb)
6	Orsolya Takacs	20 May 1985	R	field player	1.90 m (6 ft 3 in)	83 kg (183 lb)
7	Rita Dravucz	14 April 1980	R	field player	1.80 m (5 ft 11 in)	67 kg (148 lb)
8	Rita Keszthelyi	10 December 1991	R	field player	1.77 m (5 ft 10 in)	67 kg (148 lb)
9	Ildiko Toth	23 April 1987	R	field player	1.75 m (5 ft 9 in)	70 kg (150 lb)
10	Barbara Bujka	5 September 1986	L	field player	1.74 m (5 ft 9 in)	84 kg (185 lb)
11	Rita Poszkoli	20 July 1987	R	field player	1.76 m (5 ft 9 in)	72 kg (159 lb)
12	Kata Maria Menczinger	17 January 1989	R	field player	1.79 m (5 ft 10 in)	67 kg (148 lb)
13	Edina Gangl	25 June 1990	R	goalkeeper	1.83 m (6 ft 0 in)	68 kg (150 lb)

== Italy ==
No.	Name	Date of birth	L/R	Position	Height	Weight
1	Giulia Gorlero	26 September 1990	R	goalkeeper	1.79 m (5 ft 10 in)	70 kg (150 lb)
2	Simona Abbate	22 August 1983	R	field player	1.74 m (5 ft 9 in)	65 kg (143 lb)
3	Elisa Casanova	26 November 1973	R	field player	1.86 m (6 ft 1 in)	105 kg (231 lb)
4	Francesca Pomeri	18 February 1993	R	field player	1.73 m (5 ft 8 in)	73 kg (161 lb)
5	Martina Savioli	6 September 1990	R	field player	1.60 m (5 ft 3 in)	52 kg (115 lb)
6	Allegra Lapi	8 September 1985	R	field player	1.65 m (5 ft 5 in)	54 kg (119 lb)
7	Marta Colaiocco	22 February 1984	R	field player	1.73 m (5 ft 8 in)	67 kg (148 lb)
8	Roberta Bianconi	8 July 1989	R	field player	1.75 m (5 ft 9 in)	76 kg (168 lb)
9	Giulia Enrica Emmolo	16 October 1991	L	field player	1.72 m (5 ft 8 in)	66 kg (146 lb)
10	Giulia Rambaldi Guidasci	11 November 1986	R	field player	1.78 m (5 ft 10 in)	67 kg (148 lb)
11	Aleksandra Cotti	13 December 1988	R	field player	1.66 m (5 ft 5 in)	65 kg (143 lb)
12	Teresa Frassinetti	24 December 1985	R	field player	1.78 m (5 ft 10 in)	70 kg (150 lb)
13	Elena Gigli	9 July 1985	R	goalkeeper	1.90 m (6 ft 3 in)	74 kg (163 lb)

== Kazakhstan ==
No.	Name	Date of birth	L/R	Position	Height	Weight
1	Galina Rytova	10 September 1975	R	goalkeeper	1.73 m (5 ft 8 in)	68 kg (150 lb)
2	Lyudmila Chegodayeva	20 April 1992	R	field player	1.75 m (5 ft 9 in)	79 kg (174 lb)
3	Aizhan Akilbayeva	13 September 1991	R	field player	1.71 m (5 ft 7 in)	69 kg (152 lb)
4	Anna Turova	31 July 1990	R	field player	1.73 m (5 ft 8 in)	70 kg (150 lb)
5	Kamila Zakirova	25 December 1992	R	field player	1.78 m (5 ft 10 in)	63 kg (139 lb)
6	Kamila Marina	3 August 1992	R	field player	1.68 m (5 ft 6 in)	65 kg (143 lb)
7	Natalya Alexandrova	27 May 1987	R	field player	1.70 m (5 ft 7 in)	59 kg (130 lb)
8	Darya Vassilyeva	14 October 1988	R	field player	1.74 m (5 ft 9 in)	71 kg (157 lb)
9	Agata Tnasheva	6 February 1989	L	field player	1.70 m (5 ft 7 in)	72 kg (159 lb)
10	Marina Gritsenko	17 August 1980	R	field player	1.70 m (5 ft 7 in)	61 kg (134 lb)
11	Yelena Chebotova	6 December 1988	R	field player	1.72 m (5 ft 8 in)	62 kg (137 lb)
12	Assem Mussarova	13 August 1990	R	field player	1.67 m (5 ft 6 in)	58 kg (128 lb)
13	Yelena Starodubtseva	26 February 1989	R	goalkeeper	1.68 m (5 ft 6 in)	60 kg (130 lb)

== Netherlands ==
No.	Name	Date of birth	L/R	L/R	Position	Weight
1	Ilse van der Meijden	22 October 1988	R	GK	1.86 m (6 ft 1 in)	74 kg (163 lb)
2	Yasemin Smit	21 November 1984	R	FP	1.79 m (5 ft 10 in)	73 kg (161 lb)
3	Mieke Cabout	30 March 1986	R	FP	1.82 m (6 ft 0 in)	70 kg (150 lb)
4	Biurakn Hakhverdian	4 October 1985	R	FP	1.72 m (5 ft 8 in)	66 kg (146 lb)
5	Sabrina van der Sloot	16 March 1991	R	FP	1.74 m (5 ft 9 in)	60 kg (130 lb)
6	Nomi Stomphorst	23 August 1992	R	FP	1.72 m (5 ft 8 in)	66 kg (146 lb)
7	Iefke van Belkum	22 July 1986	R	FP	1.85 m (6 ft 1 in)	78 kg (172 lb)
8	Robbin Remers	20 August 1991	R	FP	1.79 m (5 ft 10 in)	69 kg (152 lb)
9	Jantien Cabout	10 January 1988	L	FP	1.72 m (5 ft 8 in)	69 kg (152 lb)
10	Nienke Vermeer	8 July 1989	L	FP	1.85 m (6 ft 1 in)	75 kg (165 lb)
11	Lieke Klaassen	23 April 1991	R	FP	1.82 m (6 ft 0 in)	96 kg (212 lb)
12	Simone Koot	12 November 1980	R	FP	1.73 m (5 ft 8 in)	65 kg (143 lb)
13	Anne Heinis	20 May 1987	R	GK	1.75 m (5 ft 9 in)	75 kg (165 lb)

== New Zealand ==
No.	Name	Date of birth	L/R	Position	Height	Weight
1	Carina Harache	6 February 1984	R	goalkeeper	1.74 m (5 ft 9 in)	66 kg (146 lb)
2	Emily Laura Cox	14 April 1984	R	field player	1.83 m (6 ft 0 in)	88 kg (194 lb)
3	Kelly Fiona Mason	16 June 1987	R	field player	1.79 m (5 ft 10 in)	80 kg (180 lb)
4	Danielle Marie Lewis	17 August 1992	R	field player	1.85 m (6 ft 1 in)	64 kg (141 lb)
5	Amy Bettina Logan	5 January 1985	R	field player	1.82 m (6 ft 0 in)	68 kg (150 lb)
6	Alexandra Rose Boyd	8 July 1991	R	field player	1.72 m (5 ft 8 in)	71 kg (157 lb)
7	Ashley Elizabeth Smallfield	21 December 1989	R	field player	1.82 m (6 ft 0 in)	66 kg (146 lb)
8	Lauren Jane Sieprath	23 October 1989	R	field player	1.76 m (5 ft 9 in)	73 kg (161 lb)
9	Johanna Helena Theelen	10 February 1992	R	field player	1.77 m (5 ft 10 in)	75 kg (165 lb)
10	Casie Lauren Bowry	10 April 1991	R	field player	1.79 m (5 ft 10 in)	81 kg (179 lb)
11	Kirsten Patricia Hudson	2 February 1988	L	field player	1.72 m (5 ft 8 in)	67 kg (148 lb)
12	Alexandra Jasmine Myles	17 October 1980	R	field player	1.73 m (5 ft 8 in)	69 kg (152 lb)
13	Brooke Ali Millar	14 October 1990	R	goalkeeper	1.80 m (5 ft 11 in)	68 kg (150 lb)

== Russia ==
No.	Name	Date of birth	L/R	Position	Height	Weight
1	Maria Kovtunovskaya	19 December 1988	R	goalkeeper	1.78 m (5 ft 10 in)	65 kg (143 lb)
2	Nadezhda Fedotova	20 May 1988	R	field player	1.75 m (5 ft 9 in)	65 kg (143 lb)
3	Ekaterina Prokofyeva	13 March 1991	R	field player	1.76 m (5 ft 9 in)	65 kg (143 lb)
4	Sofia Konukh	9 March 1980	R	field player	1.80 m (5 ft 11 in)	68 kg (150 lb)
5	Alexandra Antonova	22 December 1991	L	field player	1.75 m (5 ft 9 in)	68 kg (150 lb)
6	Natalia Ryzhova-Alenicheva	3 August 1987	R	field player	1.75 m (5 ft 9 in)	66 kg (146 lb)
7	Ekaterina Lisunova	6 October 1989	R	field player	1.76 m (5 ft 9 in)	65 kg (143 lb)
8	Evgenia Soboleva	26 August 1988	R	field player	1.80 m (5 ft 11 in)	72 kg (159 lb)
9	Ekaterina Tankeeva	28 June 1989	R	field player	1.74 m (5 ft 9 in)	77 kg (170 lb)
10	Olga Belyaeva	18 March 1985	R	field player	1.76 m (5 ft 9 in)	72 kg (159 lb)
11	Evgenia Ivanova	26 July 1987	R	field player	1.76 m (5 ft 9 in)	66 kg (146 lb)
12	Yulia Gaufler	18 August 1986	R	field player	1.74 m (5 ft 9 in)	63 kg (139 lb)
13	Anna Karnaukh	31 August 1993	R	goalkeeper	1.70 m (5 ft 7 in)	64 kg (141 lb)

== South Africa ==
No.	Name	Date of birth	L/R	Position	Height	Weight
1	Leigh Maarschalk	11 December 1985	R	goalkeeper	1.73 m (5 ft 8 in)	75 kg (165 lb)
2	Kimberly Patricia Schmidt	22 September 1983	R	field player	1.71 m (5 ft 7 in)	62 kg (137 lb)
3	Kimberly Kay	20 September 1989	R	field player	1.78 m (5 ft 10 in)	75 kg (165 lb)
4	Shelley Kirsty Faulmann	22 April 1991	R	field player	1.56 m (5 ft 1 in)	53 kg (117 lb)
5	Megan Catherine Schooling	1 May 1989	R	field player	1.82 m (6 ft 0 in)	75 kg (165 lb)
6	Laura Marie Barrett	19 June 1986	R	field player	1.68 m (5 ft 6 in)	65 kg (143 lb)
7	Christine Joan Barretto	23 August 1980	R	field player	1.70 m (5 ft 7 in)	75 kg (165 lb)
8	Lee Anne Keet	12 October 1982	R	field player	1.54 m (5 ft 1 in)	60 kg (130 lb)
9	Delaine Monique Christian	26 May 1993	R	field player	1.67 m (5 ft 6 in)	72 kg (159 lb)
10	Sarah Lee Harris	11 November 1987	R	field player	1.85 m (6 ft 1 in)	64 kg (141 lb)
11	Nicolette Poulos	4 January 1977	R	field player	1.69 m (5 ft 7 in)	66 kg (146 lb)
12	Kelsey White	18 September 1990	R	field player	1.72 m (5 ft 8 in)	75 kg (165 lb)
13	Jemma Dendy Young	19 March 1991	R	field player	1.80 m (5 ft 11 in)	65 kg (143 lb)

== Spain ==
No.	Name	Date of birth	L/R	Position	Height	Weight
1	Ana Maria Copado Amoros	31 March 1980	L	goalkeeper	1.79 m (5 ft 10 in)	70 kg (150 lb)
2	Blanca Gil Sorli	19 September 1983	L	field player	1.79 m (5 ft 10 in)	69 kg (152 lb)
3	Anna Espar I Llaquet	8 January 1993	L	field player	1.78 m (5 ft 10 in)	65 kg (143 lb)
4	Helena Lloret Gomez	5 June 1995	L	field player	1.68 m (5 ft 6 in)	61 kg (134 lb)
5	Matilde Ortiz Reyes	16 September 1990	L	field player	1.74 m (5 ft 9 in)	66 kg (146 lb)
6	Paula Chillida I Esforzado	19 August 1994	L	field player	1.75 m (5 ft 9 in)	67 kg (148 lb)
7	Lorena Miranda Dorado	7 April 1991	L	field player	1.74 m (5 ft 9 in)	77 kg (170 lb)
8	Maria Del Pilar Pena Carrasco	4 April 1986	L	field player	1.73 m (5 ft 8 in)	60 kg (130 lb)
9	Andrea Blas Martinez	14 February 1992	L	field player	1.73 m (5 ft 8 in)	77 kg (170 lb)
10	Ona Meseguer Flaque	20 February 1988	L	field player	1.67 m (5 ft 6 in)	63 kg (139 lb)
11	Maria Del Carmen Garcia Godoy	17 October 1990	L	field player	1.87 m (6 ft 2 in)	88 kg (194 lb)
12	Marta Bach Pascual	17 February 1993	L	field player	1.76 m (5 ft 9 in)	66 kg (146 lb)
13	Laura Ester Ramos	22 January 1990	L	goalkeeper	1.71 m (5 ft 7 in)	57 kg (126 lb)

== United States ==
No.	Name	Date of birth	L/R	Position	Height	Weight
1	Elizabeth Anne Armstrong	31 January 1983	R	goalkeeper	1.88 m (6 ft 2 in)	
2	Heather Danielle Petri	13 June 1978	R	field player	1.80 m (5 ft 11 in)	
3	Melissa Jon Seidemann	26 June 1990	R	field player	1.79 m (5 ft 10 in)	
4	Brenda Villa	18 April 1980	R	field player	1.63 m (5 ft 4 in)	
5	Lauren Ashley Wenger	1 March 1984	R	field player	1.88 m (6 ft 2 in)	
6	Margaret Ann Steffens	4 June 1993	R	field player	1.75 m (5 ft 9 in)	
7	Courtney Mathewson	14 September 1986	R	field player	1.70 m (5 ft 7 in)	
8	Jessica Marie Steffens	7 April 1987	R	field player	1.83 m (6 ft 0 in)	
9	Elsie Ann Windes	17 June 1985	R	field player	1.78 m (5 ft 10 in)	
10	Kelly Kristen Rulon	16 August 1984	R	field player	1.75 m (5 ft 9 in)	
11	Annika Madsen Dries	10 February 1992	R	field player	1.83 m (6 ft 0 in)	
12	Kameryn Louise Craig	21 July 1987	R	field player	1.83 m (6 ft 0 in)	
13	Tumuaialii Anae	16 October 1988	R	goalkeeper	1.80 m (5 ft 11 in)	

== Uzbekistan ==
No.	Name	Date of birth	L/R	Position	Height	Weight
1	Elena Dukhanova	10 September 1994	R	goalkeeper	1.73 m (5 ft 8 in)	78 kg (172 lb)
2	Daiana Dadabaeva	29 July 1991	R	field player	1.70 m (5 ft 7 in)	56 kg (123 lb)
3	Aleksandra Sarancha	13 January 1992	R	field player	1.72 m (5 ft 8 in)	65 kg (143 lb)
4	Eseniya Piftor	31 January 1995	R	field player	1.85 m (6 ft 1 in)	57 kg (126 lb)
5	Evgeniya Ivanova	13 July 1991	L	field player	1.68 m (5 ft 6 in)	54 kg (119 lb)
6	Liliya Umarova	23 April 1996	R	field player	1.65 m (5 ft 5 in)	50 kg (110 lb)
7	Natalya Plyusova	22 August 1988	R	field player	1.73 m (5 ft 8 in)	65 kg (143 lb)
8	Anna Sheglova	12 January 1987	R	field player	1.87 m (6 ft 2 in)	80 kg (180 lb)
9	Ramilya Halikova	26 August 1986	R	field player	1.70 m (5 ft 7 in)	52 kg (115 lb)
10	Ekaterina Morozova	16 February 1994	R	field player	1.68 m (5 ft 6 in)	50 kg (110 lb)
11	Anastasiya Osipenko	5 January 1994	R	field player	1.74 m (5 ft 9 in)	56 kg (123 lb)
12	Anna Plyusova	10 September 1992	L	field player	1.73 m (5 ft 8 in)	62 kg (137 lb)
13	Guzelya Hamitova	29 December 1991	R	field player	1.70 m (5 ft 7 in)	57 kg (126 lb)

== See also ==
- Water polo at the 2011 World Aquatics Championships – Men's team rosters
