= Water polo at the 2011 World Aquatics Championships =

The water polo portion of the 2011 World Aquatics Championships was held between July 17–30 at the Shanghai Oriental Sports Center in Shanghai, China.

== Medalists ==
=== Medal table ===
Rank	Nation	Gold	Silver	Bronze	Total
1	Greece	1	0	0	1
1	Italy	1	0	0	1
3	China	0	1	0	1
3	Serbia	0	1	0	1
5	Croatia	0	0	1	1
5	Russia	0	0	1	1
Totals (6 entries)		2	2	2	6

=== Men ===
Gold	Silver	Bronze
Italy Stefano Tempesti (c); Amaurys Perez; Niccolo Gitto; Pietro Figlioli; Alex Giorgetti; Maurizio Felugo; Niccolo Figari; Valentino Gallo; Christian Presciutti; Deni Fiorentini; Matteo Aicardi; Arnaldo Deserti; Giacomo Pastorino Head coach: Sandro Campagna	Serbia Slobodan Soro; Marko Avramović; Živko Gocić; Vanja Udovičić (c); Miloš Ćuk; Duško Pijetlović; Slobodan Nikić; Milan Aleksić; Nikola Rađen; Filip Filipović; Andrija Prlainović; Stefan Mitrović; Gojko Pijetlović Head coach: Dejan Udovičić	Croatia Josip Pavić; Damir Burić; Miho Bošković; Nikša Dobud; Maro Joković; Petar Muslim; Frano Karač; Andro Bušlje; Sandro Sukno; Samir Barač (c); Fran Paskvalin; Paulo Obradović; Ivan Buljubašić Head coach: Ratko Rudić

=== Women ===
Gold	Silver	Bronze
Greece; Eleni Kouvdou; Christina Tsoukala; Antiopi Melidoni; Ilektra Psouni; Kyriaki Liosi; Alkisti Avramidou; Alexandra Asimaki; Antigoni Roumpesi; Angeliki Gerolymou; Triantafyllia Manolioudaki; Stavroula Antonakou; Georgia Lara; Eleni Goula	China; Yang Jun; Teng Fei; Liu Ping; Sun Yujun; He Jin; Sun Yating; Song Donglun; Chen Yuan; Wang Yi; Ma Huanhuan; Sun Huizi; Zhang Lei; Wang Ying	Russia; Maria Kovtunovskaya; Nadezhda Fedotova; Ekaterina Prokofyeva; Sofia Konukh; Alexandra Antonova; Natalia Ryzhova-Alenicheva; Ekaterina Lisunova; Evgenia Soboleva; Ekaterina Tankeeva; Olga Belyaeva; Evgenia Ivanova; Yulia Gaufler; Anna Karnaukh
