= 2013 FINA Women's Water Polo World League =

- League: FINA Water Polo World League
- Sport: Water Polo
- Duration: June 2013

Super Final

FINA Women's Water Polo World League seasons
- ← 2012 2014 →

The 2011 FINA Women's Water Polo World League was the 10th edition of the event, organised by the world's governing body in aquatics, the FINA. After playing in groups within the same continent, eight teams qualify to play in a final tournament, called the Super Final in Beijing, China from June 1 to June 6, 2013.

== Super Final ==
- June, 1 – June 6, 2013, Beijing, China

=== Seeding ===
Group A	Group B
United States; Hungary; China; Russia	Spain; Italy; Australia; Canada

=== Knockout stage ===
Quarterfinals
4 June 2013
Hungary	17
Australia	16
4 June 2013
Russia	11
Spain	9
4 June 2013
China	11
Italy	8
4 June 2013
United States	6
Canada	5

Semifinals
5 June 2013
Hungary	9
Russia	12
5 June 2013
China	9
United States	7

Final
6 June 2013
Russia	7
China	8
Third place game
6 June 2013
Hungary	9
United States	10

==== Semifinals ====
All times are CST (UTC+8)

5 June 2013; 16:00	China	9–7	United States	Beijing, China
5 June 2013; 16:00	Score by quarters: 1-0, 3-2, 3-2, 2-3			Beijing, China

5 June 2013; 18:30	Hungary	9–12	Russia	Beijing, China
5 June 2013; 18:30	Score by quarters: 2-3, 0-1, 3-5, 4-3			Beijing, China

==== Bronze medal match ====
All times are CST (UTC+8)

6 June 2013; 14:30	Hungary	9–10	United States	Beijing, China
6 June 2013; 14:30	Score by quarters: 4-1, 1-2, 1-5, 3-2			Beijing, China

==== Final ====
All times are CST (UTC+8)

6 June 2013; 16:00	Russia	7–8	China	Beijing, China
6 June 2013; 16:00	Score by quarters: 1-3, 2-1, 2-3, 2-1			Beijing, China

5th–8th Places

Semifinals
5 June 2013
Australia	13
Spain	14
65June 2013
Italy	13
Canada	9

Fifth place
6 June 2013
Spain	10
Italy	8
Seventh place
6 June 2013
Australia	9
Canada	8

=== Final ranking ===
Rank	Team
Gold medal	China
Silver medal	Russia
Bronze medal	United States
4	Hungary
5	Spain
6	Italy
7	Australia
8	Canada

2013 FINA Women's Water Polo World League

China
First title

Team roster

Yang Jun, Teng Fei, Liu Ping, Sun Yujun, He Jin, Sun Yating, Song Donglun, Zhu Yajing, Mei Xiaohan, Ma Huanhuan, Zhang Cong, Zhang Lei, Wang Yi. Head coach: Alexander Kleymenov.
