= Slagter =

Slagter is a Dutch surname literally meaning butcher. Notable people with the surname include:

- Carolina Slagter (born 1994), Dutch water polo player
- Tom-Jelte Slagter (born 1989), Dutch cyclist
