= Zhang Lei (water polo) =

Chinese water polo player (born 1988)

Personal information
- Nationality: Chinese
- Born: May 9, 1988 (age 38) Anshan, China

Sport
- Country: China
- Sport: Water polo
Medal record
Women's Water polo
Representing China
World Championships
Silver medal – second place	2011 Shanghai	Team
World Cup
Bronze medal – third place	2010 Christchurch	Team
Universiade
Gold medal – first place	2011 Shenzhen	Team

Zhang Lei (born May 9, 1988, Anshan) is a Chinese female water polo player. She was part of the Chinese team that won silver at the 2011 World Championships. At the 2012 Summer Olympics, she competed for the China women's national water polo team in the women's event. She is 5 ft 7 inches tall.

== See also ==
- List of World Aquatics Championships medalists in water polo
