= Maria Barbara Amaro =

Brazilian water polo player

Personal information
- Born: February 7, 1986 (age 40)
- Height: 1.78 m (5 ft 10 in)
- Weight: 75 kg (165 lb)
Medal record
Women's water polo
Representing Brazil
Pan American Games

Maria Barbara Amaro (born 7 February 1986) is a water polo player from Brazil.

She played with the Brazil women's national water polo team at the 2011 World Aquatics Championships.

She played for the University of Hawaii.
