= Robbin Remers =

Dutch water polo player (born 1991)

Personal information
- Nationality: Dutch
- Born: August 20, 1991 (age 35)

Sport
- Sport: Water polo

Robbin Remers (born 20 August 1991) is a Dutch water polo player.

She was part of the Dutch team at the 2011 World Aquatics Championships,

== See also ==
- Netherlands at the 2011 World Aquatics Championships
