= Gao Ao =

Chinese water polo player (born 1990)

Personal information
- Nationality: Chinese
- Born: July 26, 1990 (age 35) Beijing, China

Sport
- Country: China
- Sport: Water polo
Medal record
Women's Water polo
Representing China
World Cup
Bronze medal – third place	2010 Christchurch	Team
Universiade
Gold medal – first place	2009 Belgrade	Team

Ao Gao (born 26 July 1990 in Beijing) is a female Chinese water polo player who was part of the silver medal winning team at the 2007 World Junior Championship. She competed at the 2008 Summer Olympics and the 2012 Summer Olympics. She has also played water polo at Arizona State University.

== See also ==
- China at the 2012 Summer Olympics
- Water polo at the 2012 Summer Olympics – Women's tournament
