= Emily Feher =

American water polo player (born 1985)

Personal information
- Born: March 29, 1985 (age 41) Orange, California, U.S.
Medal record
Women's water polo
Representing the United States
FINA World Cup
Gold medal – first place	2010 New Zealand	Team competition
World Championships
Silver medal – second place	2005 Montréal	Team competition

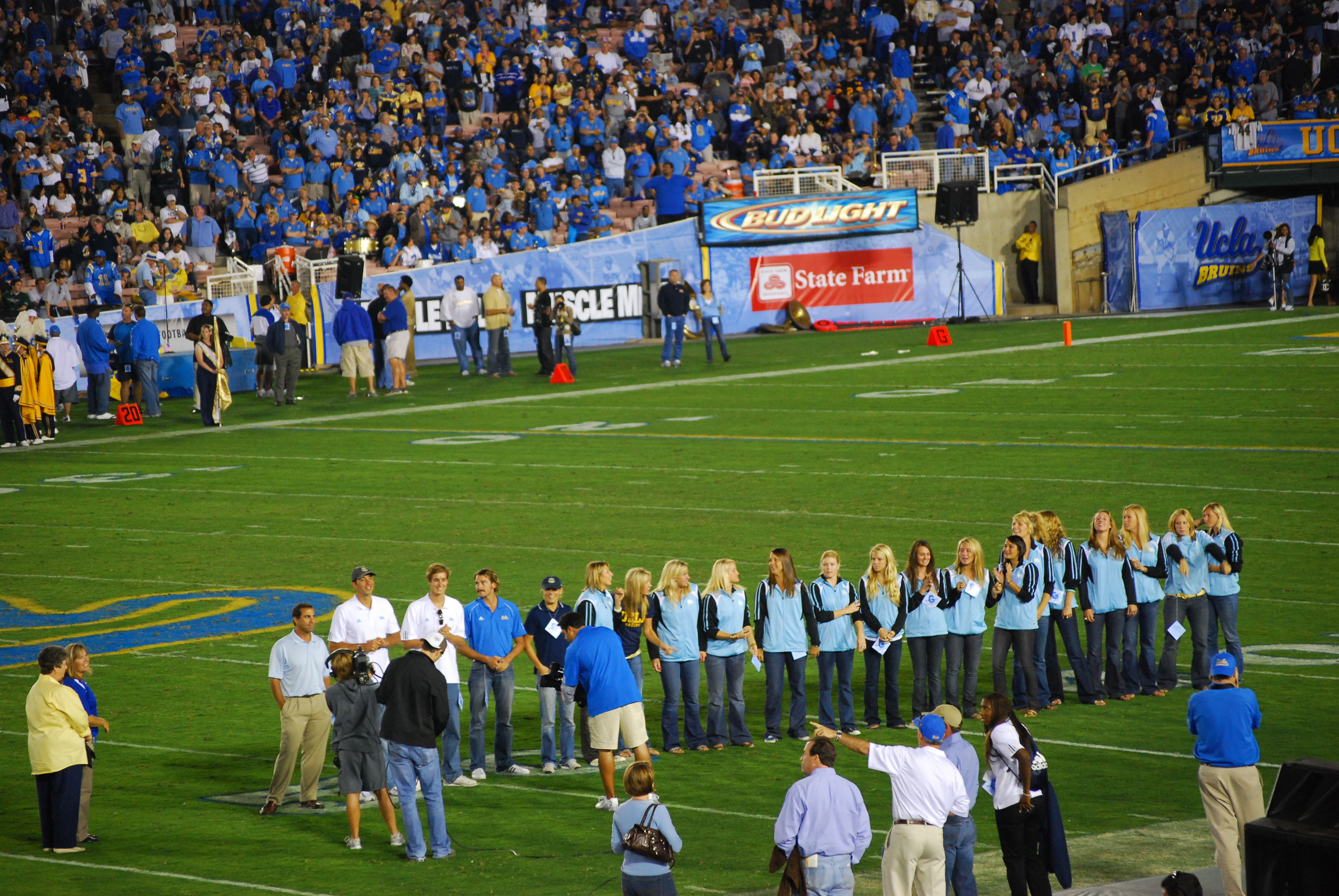

Emily Jane Feher (born March 29, 1985) is a water polo goalkeeper from the United States. She was a member of the US Women's Water Polo Team that won the silver medal at the 2005 World Aquatics Championships in Montréal, Canada.

Feher went to Foothill High School in Santa Ana, California, and UCLA. At UCLA, she helped the Bruins win three NCAA National Water Polo Championships.

Playing for head coach Adam Krikorian, she became the only goalkeeper who had won three national titles.

Following her athletic career, Emily soon after pursued her philanthropic interests by joining the Peace Corps in Cameroon. She is currently serving as a Public Health Coordinator in Northern Cameroon.

== International Competitions ==
- 2001 – FINA Junior World Championships, Perth, Australia (1st place)
- 2002 – Junior Pan American Games, Boca Raton, US (1st place)
- 2003 – FINA Junior World Championships, Calgary, Canada (2nd place)
- 2004 – Junior Pan American Championships, San Salvador, El Salvador (1st place)
- 2005 – FINA Junior World Championships, Perth, Australia (1st place)
- 2005 – FINA World League, Kirishi, Russia (5th place)
- 2005 – World Championships, Montréal, Canada (2nd place)
- 2006 – 2006 FINA World Cup, Tianjin, China (4th place)
- 2010 – 2010 FINA World Cup, Christchurch, New Zealand (1st place)

== See also ==
- List of World Aquatics Championships medalists in water polo
