= Caroline Clark =

American water polo player (born 1990)

Personal information
- Full name: Caroline Archer Clark
- Nickname: KK
- National team: USA
- Born: June 28, 1990 (age 36) Palo Alto, California, U.S.
- Height: 6 ft 2 in (188 cm)
- Weight: 72 kg (159 lb)

Sport
- Country: United States
- Sport: Water polo
- Position: Utility (multiple positions)
- College team: University of California Los Angeles
- Club: Norcal Water Polo Club; New York Athletic Club (2016)
- Coached by: E. Samuels, J. Burke (Sacred Heart); Brandon Brooks (UCLA); Adam Krikorian (Nat. Team, Olympics)
Medal record
Women's water polo
Representing United States
Olympic Games
Gold medal – first place	2016 Rio de Janeiro	Team
Universiade
Silver medal – second place	2011 Shenzhen	Team
Pan American Games
Gold medal – first place	2015 Toronto	Team

Caroline Archer "KK" Clark (born June 28, 1990) was an American female swimmer and water polo player who competed for the University of California Los Angeles and participated with the U.S. Women's Water Polo team at the 2016 Summer Olympics in Rio de Janeiro Brazil, where she won a team gold medal.

== Early life ==
Clark was born in Palo Alto, California on June 28, 1990 to Peter and Jane Dorst Clark, the youngest of three daughters. From a family of aquatic athletes, two of her sisters played collegiate Water Polo for U.C. Santa Barbara, and her Aunt Marybeth Dorst was a member of the U.S. 1980 Olympic Women's Swimming team. Her Uncle Chris Dorst was part of the 1980 U.S. Olympic team, and competed in swimming at the 1984 Los Angeles Olympics. As a High School upperclassman around 2006-2007, Caroline attended and played Water Polo for Sacred Heart Girls Preparatory School, a private co-education Roman Catholic School in Atherton, California under Head Coaches Ed Samuels and Jon Burke. A former player and Assistant Water Polo Coach for U.C. Davis, from 2006-2018 Coach Burke would lead Sacred Heart to ten consecutive section championships. Burke was named the California High School Water Polo Coach of the Year in 2017, and during Clark's tenure with Sacred Heart was named the 2006 USA Water Polo Central Zone Development Coach of the Year.

== High School Water Polo ==
In her Senior High School year at Sacred Heart, Caroline earned first-team All-America honors and was twice honored on the first team as an All-CIF Central Coast inductee. In her Senior year at Sacred Heart, her team was ranked first in California's Central College Section, and had won three straight WCAL titles. That year, Sacred Heart won the St. Francis Tournament Championship, and the North Coast Section Championship. Scoring two goals, Clark helped lead Sacred Heart to the 2007 CIF Central Coast Section Division II Championship for the first time in the school's history, defeating St. Francis 6-1. When not engaged in seasonal play that year, Clark had visited Australia as part of the U.S. Youth National Water Polo Team, where she both competed and learned elite level skills. She had earned honors as an All American in swimming as part of the National Interscholastic Coaches Swimming Association.(NICSA). In addition to High School competition, she competed for the Norcal Water Polo Club. In addition to her All American honors in Water Polo, she earned All America honors as a swimming, competing with Sacred Heart's 200 and 400-meter freestyle relay teams.

Competing with the Women's USA National Water Polo team, she was coached by Adam Krikorian.

== University of California Los Angeles ==
Clark attended and competed in Water Polo for the University of California Los Angeles under Head Women's Coach Brandon Brooks from around 2009-2012, graduating in 2012 with a major in History. Due to her versatile skills, and value to the team, she played as a utility player, playing different positions during games. By her Junior year at UCLA, she had earned All-Mountain Pacific Sports Federation (MPSF) Team and ALL-MPSF Academic Honors for two successive years, and was an honorable mention Association of Collegiate Water Polo Coaches (ACWPC) All-American. An exceptional contributor to team scoring, entering her Senior year, she had scored 111 goals in 94 matches.

== International competition highlights ==
In 2011, she captured a silver medal at the 2011 World University Games in Shenzhen, China. In 2013, she competed with the American team at the 2013 World Aquatics Championships in Barcelona, Spain earning a bronze medal. In 2015, she won a gold medal at the 2015 Summer Pan American Games in Toronto, Canada, and a gold medal at the 2014 FINA World Cup.

== 2016 Rio Olympic Gold ==
She competed with the Women's U.S. Water Polo team at the 2016 Summer Olympics in Rio de Janeiro, where she won a team gold medal. The USA Women's Water Polo Team had been the 2012 Olympic champion, and again won the 2016 Rio Olympics with a decisive 12-5 victory against the women's team from Italy, who took the silver medal. Showing consistency and dominance in the Olympic sport of Water Polo, the U.S. Women became the first Water Polo team to earn medals in all of the five Olympic women’s water polo tournaments. Italy, the 2004 Athens Olympic champion, took the silver medal, and Russia took the bronze medal in a long game against Hungary, where they won by a score of 7-6.

== See also ==
- United States women's Olympic water polo team records and statistics
- List of Olympic champions in women's water polo
- List of Olympic medalists in water polo (women)
