= Diana Antonova =

Russian water polo player

Personal information
- Born: 17 January 1993 (age 33) Russia
- Height: 5 ft 6 in (1.68 m)
Medal record
Women's water polo
Representing Russia
Universiade
Gold medal – first place	2013 Kazan	Team
Bronze medal – third place	2011 Shenzhen	Team

Diana Antonova (born January 17, 1993) is a Russian water polo player. At the 2012 Summer Olympics, she competed for the Russia women's national water polo team in the women's event. She is 1.68 m (5 ft 6 in) tall.
