= Anna Ustyukhina =

Russian water polo player

Personal information
- Born: 18 March 1989 (age 37)
- Height: 177 cm (5 ft 10 in)
- Weight: 70 kg (154 lb)

Sport
- Sport: Water polo
- Club: SKIF-CSP Izmailovo
Medal record
Representing Russia
Olympic Games
Bronze medal – third place	2016 Rio de Janeiro	team
Universiade
Bronze medal – third place	2009 Belgrade	Team
Bronze medal – third place	2011 Shenzhen	Team

Anna Ustyukhina (born 18 March 1989) is a water polo athlete from Russia. She was part of the Russian team at the 2016 Summer Olympics, who won the bronze medal.

== See also ==
- Russia women's Olympic water polo team records and statistics
- List of Olympic medalists in water polo (women)
- List of women's Olympic water polo tournament goalkeepers
- List of World Aquatics Championships medalists in water polo
