= Anna Timofeeva =

Russian water polo player

Personal information
- Full name: Anna Viktorovna Timofeeva
- Nationality: Russia
- Born: 18 July 1987 (age 39) Gorky, Soviet Union (now Nizhny Novgorod, Russia)
- Height: 1.78 m (5 ft 10 in)
- Weight: 86 kg (190 lb)

Sport
- Sport: Water polo
- Position: Centre back
- Current club: Yugra Khanty-Mansiysk
Medal record
Olympic Games
Bronze medal – third place	2016 Rio de Janeiro	Team
World Championships
Bronze medal – third place	2009 Rome	Team
Bronze medal – third place	2017 Budapest	Team
European Championships
Silver medal – second place	2020 Budapest
Universiade
Bronze medal – third place	2011 Shenzhen	Team

Anna Viktorovna Timofeeva (Russian: Анна Викторовна Тимофеева; born 18 July 1987) is a Russian water polo player. She was part of the Russian team at the 2015 World Aquatics Championships. She participated in the 2016 Summer Olympics.

== See also ==
- List of Olympic medalists in water polo (women)
- List of World Aquatics Championships medalists in water polo
