= Stephanie Valin =

Canadian water polo player (born 1987)

Personal information
- Born: July 6, 1987 (age 38) Montreal, Canada

Sport
- Sport: Water polo
Medal record
Representing Canada
Pan American Games
| Silver medal – second place | 2015 Toronto | Team |

Stephanie Valin (born July 6, 1987) is a water polo player from Canada.

She was a member of the Canada women's national water polo team at the 2011 World Aquatics Championships, 2013 World Aquatics Championships, and at the 2015 Pan American Games.
