= Anne Heinis =

Dutch water polo player (born 1987)

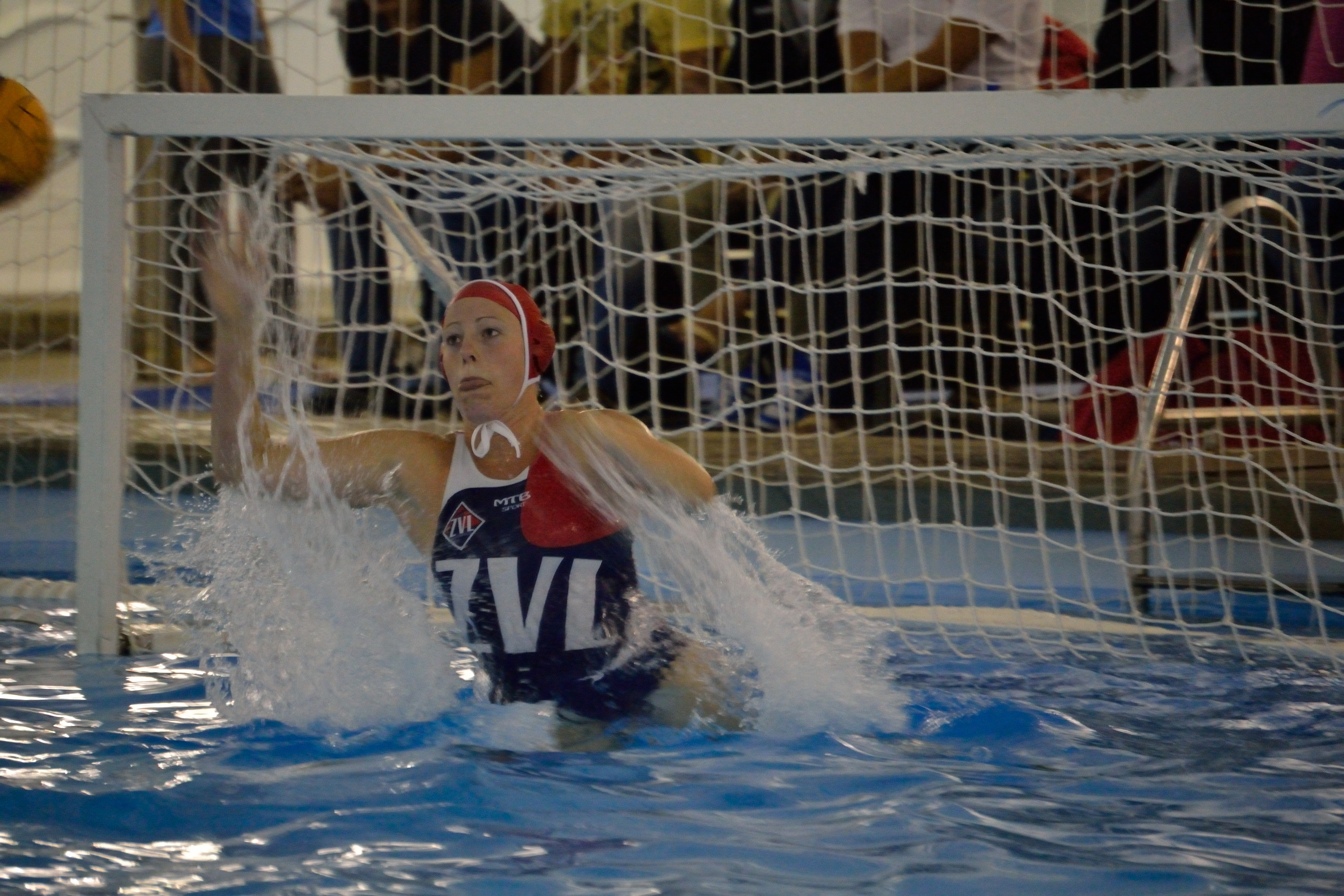

Personal information
- Nationality: Dutch
- Born: May 20, 1987 (age 39) Zaandam, Netherlands

Sport
- Sport: Water polo
- Position: Goalie

Anne Heinis (born May 20, 1987) is a Dutch water polo player.

She was part of the Dutch team at the 2009 World Aquatics Championships, 2011 World Aquatics Championships, and 2013 World Aquatics Championships.
