= Water polo at the 2011 Summer Universiade =

Water polo contest

Water polo at the XXVI Summer Universiade

Water polo was contested at the 2011 Summer Universiade from August 11 to August 23 at the Bao'an Natatorium in Shenzhen, China.

== Medal summary ==
=== Medal table ===
Rank	Nation	Gold	Silver	Bronze	Total
1	China (CHN)	1	0	0	1
1	Serbia (SRB)	1	0	0	1
3	Russia (RUS)	0	1	1	2
4	United States (USA)	0	1	0	1
5	Macedonia (MKD)	0	0	1	1
Totals (5 entries)		2	2	2	6

=== Events ===
Event	Gold	Silver	Bronze
Men	Serbia (SRB); Branislav Mitrović; Luka Šaponjić; Marko Matović; Srđan Vuksanović; Miloš Miličić; Boris Vapenski; Strahinja Rašović; Nikola Dedović; Nemanja Ubović; Marko Petković; Petar Filipović; Aleksa Šaponjić; Stefan Živojinović	Russia (RUS); Victor Ivanov; Nikita Yankov; Artem Odintsov; Alexey Ryzhov Alenichev; Yury Cheshev; Dmitry Antipov; Pavel Khalturin; Artur Fatakhutdinov; Kirill Novoksenov; Victor Vishniakov; Sergey Lisunov; Nikolay Lazarev; Egor Rastorguev	Macedonia (MKD); Miloš Marinković; Kristijan Manaskov; Saša Mišić; Dimitar Dimovski; Uroš Kalinić; Igor Milanović; Milan Petrović; Martin Pulejkovski; Miroslav Randjić; Vedran Circović; Boris Letica; Mario Sinadinovski; Bojan Janevski
Women	China (CHN); Yang Jun; Teng Fei; Liu Ping; Sun Yujun; He Jin; Sun Yating; Song Donglun; Chen Yuan; Wang Yi; Ma Huanhuan; Wang Zhujia; Zhang Lei; Wang Ying	United States (USA); Amber Oland; Grace Reynolds; Pallavi Menon; Alyssa Lo; Forel Davies; Leah Robertson; Nadia Dan; Julie Oreglia; Stephanie Schnugg; Adriana Vogt; Caroline Clark; Kimberly Benedetti; Cassandra Wyckoff	Russia (RUS); Anna Ustyukhina; Diana Antonova; Elena Garipova; Victoria Kurochkina; Alena Vylegzhanina; Natalia Okuneva; Anna Bogdanova; Olga Belova; Oleksandra Karpovich; Marina Kalyagina; Anna Timofeeva; Maria Akhtyrchenko; Olesya Abaimova

== Men ==
The men's tournament was held from August 11 to August 23. A maximum of sixteen teams would compete.

=== Teams ===
Pool A

- China
- Spain
- Turkey
- North Macedonia

Pool B

- Australia
- Russia
- Brazil

Pool C

- Serbia
- United States
- France
- Singapore

Pool D

- Hungary
- Italy
- Japan

== Women ==
The women's tournament was held from August 12 to August 22. A maximum of ten teams would compete.

=== Teams ===
Pool A

- China
- Canada
- Great Britain
- Italy

Pool B

- Russia
- Australia
- France
- Mexico
- United States
