= Carolina Slagter =

Dutch water polo player (born 1994)

Personal information
- Nationality: Dutch
- Born: 30 April 1994 (age 32)

Sport
- Sport: Water polo
- Handedness: Left
- Position: Centre forward
- Current club: ZVL-1886
- Number: 6

Senior clubs
- Years: Team
- –: AZC Alphen ZVL-1886 DFVE Dunaújváros
National team
- Years: Team
- Netherlands

Carolina Slagter (30 April 1994) is a Dutch water polo player.

She was part of the Dutch team at the 2013 World Aquatics Championships.
