= Wang Ying (water polo) =

Chinese water polo player (born 1988)

Personal information
- Nationality: Chinese
- Born: August 7, 1988 (age 37) Guangxi, China

Sport
- Country: China
- Sport: Water polo
Medal record
Women's Water polo
Representing China
World Championships
Silver medal – second place	2011 Shanghai	Team
Universiade
Gold medal – first place	2009 Belgrade	Team
Gold medal – first place	2011 Shenzhen	Team

Wang Ying (born 7 August 1988 in Guangxi) is a female Chinese water polo player who was part of the gold medal-winning team at the 2007 National Championship Tournament. She competed at the 2008 and 2012 Summer Olympics.

== See also ==
- China women's Olympic water polo team records and statistics
- List of women's Olympic water polo tournament goalkeepers
- List of World Aquatics Championships medalists in water polo
