= Wang Yi (water polo) =

Chinese water polo player (born 1987)

Personal information
- Nationality: Chinese
- Born: July 29, 1987 (age 38) Shandong, China

Sport
- Country: China
- Sport: Water polo
Medal record
Women's water polo
Representing China
World Championships
Silver medal – second place	2011 Shanghai	Team
World Cup
Bronze medal – third place	2010 Christchurch	Team
Universiade
Gold medal – first place	2009 Belgrade	Team
Gold medal – first place	2011 Shenzhen	Team

Wang Yi (Chinese: 王毅; pinyin: Wáng Yì; born July 29, 1987, in Shandong) is a Chinese water polo player who was part of the silver medal-winning team at the 2007 World Junior Championship. She also competed at the 2008 and 2012 Summer Olympics. She was the top sprinter at the 2008 Olympics, with 18 sprints won.

== See also ==
- China women's Olympic water polo team records and statistics
- List of World Aquatics Championships medalists in water polo
