= Sun Yating =

Chinese water polo player (born 1988)

Personal information
- Born: 24 February 1988 (age 38) Tianjin, China
- Height: 180 cm (5 ft 11 in)
- Weight: 76 kg (168 lb)

Sport
- Country: China
- Sport: Water polo
Medal record
Women's water polo
Representing China
World Championships
Silver medal – second place	2011 Shanghai	Team
World Cup
Bronze medal – third place	2010 Christchurch	Team
Universiade
Gold medal – first place	2009 Belgrade	Team
Gold medal – first place	2011 Shenzhen	Team
Asian Games
Gold medal – first place	2010 Guangzhou	Team
Gold medal – first place	2014 Incheon	Team
Asian Aquatics Championships
Gold medal – first place	2012 Dubai	Team
Gold medal – first place	2016 Tokyo	Team
Gold medal – first place	2025 Ahmedabad	Team

Sun Yating (Chinese: 孙雅婷, born 24 February 1988 in Tianjin) is a female Chinese professional water polo player, who was part of the silver medal winning team at the 2007 World Junior Championship. She has competed at the 2008, 2012 and 2016 Summer Olympics. She has played for Olympiacos in Greece, where she won the Greek Championship.

== See also ==
- China women's Olympic water polo team records and statistics
- List of players who have appeared in multiple women's Olympic water polo tournaments
- List of World Aquatics Championships medalists in water polo
