= Teng Fei =

Chinese water polo player (born 1988)

Personal information
- Nationality: Chinese
- Born: January 23, 1988 (age 38) Beijing, China

Sport
- Country: China
- Sport: Water polo
Medal record
Women's Water polo
Representing China
World Championships
Silver medal – second place	2011 Shanghai	Team
World Cup
Bronze medal – third place	2010 Christchurch	Team
Universiade
Gold medal – first place	2009 Belgrade	Team
Gold medal – first place	2011 Shenzhen	Team

Teng Fei (born January 23, 1988, in Beijing) is a female Chinese water polo player who was part of the silver medal winning team at the 2007 World Junior Championship. She competed at the 2008 and 2012 Summer Olympics.

== See also ==
- List of World Aquatics Championships medalists in water polo
