= Song Donglun =

Chinese water polo player (born 1991)

Song Dolglun
Personal information
- Nationality: Chinese
- Born: April 26, 1991 (age 35) Beijing, China

Sport
- Country: China
- Sport: Water polo
Medal record
Women's Water polo
Representing China
World Championships
Silver medal – second place	2011 Shanghai	Team
World Cup
Bronze medal – third place	2010 Christchurch	Team
Universiade
Gold medal – first place	2011 Shenzhen	Team

Song Donglun (born 26 April 1991, Beijing) is a Chinese water polo player. She competed in women's national water polo team on behalf of the People's Republic of China during the London 2012 and Rio de Janeiro 2016 Summer Olympics. She and China's women's national water polo team ranked in 5th place at the 2012 Summer Olympics and 7th at the 2016 games. She is 5 ft 10 inches tall.

== See also ==
- List of World Aquatics Championships medalists in water polo
- Chinese Athletic Association
