= Water polo at the 2011 World Aquatics Championships – Women's tournament =

Women's water polo 2011 World Aquatics Championships
Tournament details
- Venue(s): 1 (in 1 host city)
- Dates: 17–29 July
- Teams: 16 (from 5 confederations)

Final positions
- Champions: Greece (1st title)
- Runner-up: China
- Third place: Russia
- Fourth place: Italy

Tournament statistics
- Matches played: 48
- Goals scored: 949 (19.77 per match)
- Top scorer(s): (Spain) Blanca Gil (25 goals)

Awards
- Best player: (China) Ma Huanhuan

The women's water polo tournament at the 2011 World Aquatics Championships, organised by the FINA, was held in Shanghai, China from 17 to 29 July 2011.

== Qualification ==
| Event | Date | Location | Vacancies | Qualified |
|---|---|---|---|---|
| Host Nation | – | – | 1 | China |
| 2010 FINA Women's Water Polo World Cup | August 17–22, 2010 | (New Zealand) Christchurch | 4 | United States; Australia; Russia; Greece^{†} |
| 2010 FINA Women's Water Polo World League | | Various locations | 2 | Canada; Hungary |
| Europe | – | – | 3 | Netherlands; Italy; Spain |
| Americas Qualification tournament | February 21–27, 2011 | (Brazil) São Paulo | 2 | Cuba; Brazil |
| Asian Games | November 15–17, 2010 | (China) Guangzhou | 2 | Kazakhstan; Uzbekistan |
| Africa | – | – | 1 | South Africa |
| Oceania | – | – | 1 | New Zealand |
| TOTAL | | | 16 | |

^{†} Greece did not qualify through the World League or the World Cup, but was allowed to qualify for the tournament because China (the third team to qualify through the World Cup) had already qualified through the host nation slot, and Greece was the highest non-qualifying finisher in the World Cup.

== Preliminary round ==
| Qualified for QF |
| Will play QF qualification |
| Advanced to placement matches |

The draw for the competition was held on April 15, 2011.

=== Group A ===
All times are CST (UTC+8)

| Team | Pld | W | D | L | GF | GA | GD | Pts |
|---|---|---|---|---|---|---|---|---|
| United States | 3 | 2 | 1 | 0 | 37 | 18 | +19 | 5 |
| Netherlands | 3 | 1 | 2 | 0 | 29 | 19 | +10 | 4 |
| Hungary | 3 | 1 | 1 | 1 | 37 | 31 | +6 | 3 |
| Kazakhstan | 3 | 0 | 0 | 3 | 13 | 48 | −35 | 0 |

| July 17, 2011; 09:30 | Match 1 | Netherlands | 7–7 | United States | Shanghai Oriental Sports Center, Shanghai; Attendance: 700; Referees: Caputi (ITA), Margets (SLO) |
| July 17, 2011; 09:30 | Match 1 | Score by quarters: 1–1, 2–2, 3–2, 1–2 | | | Shanghai Oriental Sports Center, Shanghai; Attendance: 700; Referees: Caputi (ITA), Margets (SLO) |
| July 17, 2011; 09:30 | Match 1 | Vermeer 3 | Goals | Wenger 3 | Shanghai Oriental Sports Center, Shanghai; Attendance: 700; Referees: Caputi (ITA), Margets (SLO) |

| July 17, 2011; 10:50 | Match 2 | Kazakhstan | 6–21 | Hungary | Shanghai Oriental Sports Center, Shanghai; Attendance: 700; Referees: Ni (CHN), Tulga (TUR) |
| July 17, 2011; 10:50 | Match 2 | Score by quarters: 3–5, 0–6, 3–6, 0–4 | | | Shanghai Oriental Sports Center, Shanghai; Attendance: 700; Referees: Ni (CHN), Tulga (TUR) |
| July 17, 2011; 10:50 | Match 2 | Vassilyeva, Gritsenko 2 | Goals | Keszthelyi 5 | Shanghai Oriental Sports Center, Shanghai; Attendance: 700; Referees: Ni (CHN), Tulga (TUR) |

| July 19, 2011; 18:20 | Match 14 | Hungary | 7–16 | United States | Shanghai Oriental Sports Center, Shanghai; Attendance: 650; Referees: Bock (GER), Naumov (RUS) |
| July 19, 2011; 18:20 | Match 14 | Score by quarters: 2–3, 2–4, 3–5, 0–4 | | | Shanghai Oriental Sports Center, Shanghai; Attendance: 650; Referees: Bock (GER), Naumov (RUS) |
| July 19, 2011; 18:20 | Match 14 | Szűcs 3 | Goals | Mathewson 3 | Shanghai Oriental Sports Center, Shanghai; Attendance: 650; Referees: Bock (GER), Naumov (RUS) |

| July 19, 2011; 19:40 | Match 15 | Netherlands | 13–3 | Kazakhstan | Shanghai Oriental Sports Center, Shanghai; Attendance: 500; Referees: Cabral (BRA), Wengenroth (SUO) |
| July 19, 2011; 19:40 | Match 15 | Score by quarters: 4–1, 3–1, 3–0, 3–1 | | | Shanghai Oriental Sports Center, Shanghai; Attendance: 500; Referees: Cabral (BRA), Wengenroth (SUO) |
| July 19, 2011; 19:40 | Match 15 | Vermeer 4 | Goals | Gritsenko 2 | Shanghai Oriental Sports Center, Shanghai; Attendance: 500; Referees: Cabral (BRA), Wengenroth (SUO) |

| July 21, 2011; 13:30 | Match 20 | Netherlands | 9–9 | Hungary | Shanghai Oriental Sports Center, Shanghai; Attendance: 300; Referees: Caputi (ITA), Williams (NZL) |
| July 21, 2011; 13:30 | Match 20 | Score by quarters: 3–1, 0–0, 3–3, 3–5 | | | Shanghai Oriental Sports Center, Shanghai; Attendance: 300; Referees: Caputi (ITA), Williams (NZL) |
| July 21, 2011; 13:30 | Match 20 | Cabout, van Belkum 4 | Goals | Bujka 3 | Shanghai Oriental Sports Center, Shanghai; Attendance: 300; Referees: Caputi (ITA), Williams (NZL) |

| July 21, 2011; 17:00 | Match 21 | Kazakhstan | 4–14 | United States | Shanghai Oriental Sports Center, Shanghai; Attendance: 600; Referees: Ciric (SRB), Menendez (CUB) |
| July 21, 2011; 17:00 | Match 21 | Score by quarters: 3–4, 0–4, 0–4, 1–2 | | | Shanghai Oriental Sports Center, Shanghai; Attendance: 600; Referees: Ciric (SRB), Menendez (CUB) |
| July 21, 2011; 17:00 | Match 21 | Chebotova 2 | Goals | Dries, Craig 3 | Shanghai Oriental Sports Center, Shanghai; Attendance: 600; Referees: Ciric (SRB), Menendez (CUB) |

=== Group B ===
All times are CST (UTC+8)

| Team | Pld | W | D | L | GF | GA | GD | Pts |
|---|---|---|---|---|---|---|---|---|
| Canada | 3 | 3 | 0 | 0 | 43 | 17 | +26 | 6 |
| Australia | 3 | 2 | 0 | 1 | 46 | 16 | +30 | 4 |
| New Zealand | 3 | 1 | 0 | 2 | 27 | 29 | −2 | 2 |
| Uzbekistan | 3 | 0 | 0 | 3 | 14 | 68 | −54 | 0 |

| July 17, 2011; 12:10 | Match 3 | Australia | 7–10 | Canada | Shanghai Oriental Sports Center, Shanghai; Attendance: 500; Referees: Stavridis (GRE), Bock (GER) |
| July 17, 2011; 12:10 | Match 3 | Score by quarters: 0–2, 2–3, 2–3, 3–2 | | | Shanghai Oriental Sports Center, Shanghai; Attendance: 500; Referees: Stavridis (GRE), Bock (GER) |
| July 17, 2011; 12:10 | Match 3 | Webster 2 | Goals | five players 2 | Shanghai Oriental Sports Center, Shanghai; Attendance: 500; Referees: Stavridis (GRE), Bock (GER) |

| July 17, 2011; 13:30 | Match 4 | New Zealand | 19–6 | Uzbekistan | Shanghai Oriental Sports Center, Shanghai; Attendance: 450; Referees: Pinker (RSA), Borrell (ESP) |
| July 17, 2011; 13:30 | Match 4 | Score by quarters: 4–2, 5–1, 6–1, 4–2 | | | Shanghai Oriental Sports Center, Shanghai; Attendance: 450; Referees: Pinker (RSA), Borrell (ESP) |
| July 17, 2011; 13:30 | Match 4 | Hudson 6 | Goals | Halikova 3 | Shanghai Oriental Sports Center, Shanghai; Attendance: 450; Referees: Pinker (RSA), Borrell (ESP) |

| July 19, 2011; 09:30 | Match 9 | Uzbekistan | 6–22 | Canada | Shanghai Oriental Sports Center, Shanghai; Attendance: 450; Referees: Menendez (CUB), Makita (JPN) |
| July 19, 2011; 09:30 | Match 9 | Score by quarters: 2–6, 1–6, 1–7, 2–3 | | | Shanghai Oriental Sports Center, Shanghai; Attendance: 450; Referees: Menendez (CUB), Makita (JPN) |
| July 19, 2011; 09:30 | Match 9 | Sarancha 2 | Goals | Alogbo 5 | Shanghai Oriental Sports Center, Shanghai; Attendance: 450; Referees: Menendez (CUB), Makita (JPN) |

| July 19, 2011; 10:50 | Match 10 | Australia | 12–4 | New Zealand | Shanghai Oriental Sports Center, Shanghai; Attendance: 450; Referees: Ni (CHN), Pinker (RSA) |
| July 19, 2011; 10:50 | Match 10 | Score by quarters: 3–0, 2–0, 4–2, 3–2 | | | Shanghai Oriental Sports Center, Shanghai; Attendance: 450; Referees: Ni (CHN), Pinker (RSA) |
| July 19, 2011; 10:50 | Match 10 | Ralph 3 | Goals | Mason 2 | Shanghai Oriental Sports Center, Shanghai; Attendance: 450; Referees: Ni (CHN), Pinker (RSA) |

| July 21, 2011; 18:20 | Match 22 | Australia | 27–2 | Uzbekistan | Shanghai Oriental Sports Center, Shanghai; Attendance: 400; Referees: Wengenroth (SUI), Gonzalez (PUR) |
| July 21, 2011; 18:20 | Match 22 | Score by quarters: 3–1, 9–0, 6–1, 9–0 | | | Shanghai Oriental Sports Center, Shanghai; Attendance: 400; Referees: Wengenroth (SUI), Gonzalez (PUR) |
| July 21, 2011; 18:20 | Match 22 | three players 4 | Goals | Sarancha, Plyusova 1 | Shanghai Oriental Sports Center, Shanghai; Attendance: 400; Referees: Wengenroth (SUI), Gonzalez (PUR) |

| July 21, 2011; 19:40 | Match 23 | New Zealand | 4–11 | Canada | Shanghai Oriental Sports Center, Shanghai; Attendance: 500; Referees: Naumov (RUS), Alexandrescu (ROU) |
| July 21, 2011; 19:40 | Match 23 | Score by quarters: 2–3, 1–4, 1–2, 0–2 | | | Shanghai Oriental Sports Center, Shanghai; Attendance: 500; Referees: Naumov (RUS), Alexandrescu (ROU) |
| July 21, 2011; 19:40 | Match 23 | four players 1 | Goals | Csikos 4 | Shanghai Oriental Sports Center, Shanghai; Attendance: 500; Referees: Naumov (RUS), Alexandrescu (ROU) |

=== Group C ===
All times are CST (UTC+8)

| Team | Pld | W | D | L | GF | GA | GD | Pts |
|---|---|---|---|---|---|---|---|---|
| Greece | 3 | 3 | 0 | 0 | 27 | 22 | +5 | 6 |
| Russia | 3 | 2 | 0 | 1 | 38 | 18 | +20 | 4 |
| Spain | 3 | 1 | 0 | 2 | 29 | 32 | –3 | 2 |
| Brazil | 3 | 0 | 0 | 3 | 16 | 38 | –22 | 0 |

| July 17, 2011; 15:00 | Match 5 | Brazil | 4–15 | Russia | Shanghai Oriental Sports Center, Shanghai; Attendance: 600; Referees: Flahive (AUS), Koryzna (POL) |
| July 17, 2011; 15:00 | Match 5 | Score by quarters: 1–6, 1–2, 2–2, 0–5 | | | Shanghai Oriental Sports Center, Shanghai; Attendance: 600; Referees: Flahive (AUS), Koryzna (POL) |
| July 17, 2011; 15:00 | Match 5 | four players 1 | Goals | Belyaeva 4 | Shanghai Oriental Sports Center, Shanghai; Attendance: 600; Referees: Flahive (AUS), Koryzna (POL) |

| July 17, 2011; 16:20 | Match 6 | Greece | 10–9 | Spain | Shanghai Oriental Sports Center, Shanghai; Attendance: 450; Referees: Remnet (NED), Koganov (AZE) |
| July 17, 2011; 16:20 | Match 6 | Score by quarters: 2–3, 3–1, 3–2, 2–3 | | | Shanghai Oriental Sports Center, Shanghai; Attendance: 450; Referees: Remnet (NED), Koganov (AZE) |
| July 17, 2011; 16:20 | Match 6 | Asimaki, Gerolymou 3 | Goals | Gil Sorli 3 | Shanghai Oriental Sports Center, Shanghai; Attendance: 450; Referees: Remnet (NED), Koganov (AZE) |

| July 19, 2011; 12:10 | Match 11 | Spain | 8–18 | Russia | Shanghai Oriental Sports Center, Shanghai; Attendance: 250; Referees: Flahive (AUS), Deslieres (CAN) |
| July 19, 2011; 12:10 | Match 11 | Score by quarters: 1–4, 3–4, 3–6, 1–4 | | | Shanghai Oriental Sports Center, Shanghai; Attendance: 250; Referees: Flahive (AUS), Deslieres (CAN) |
| July 19, 2011; 12:10 | Match 11 | three players 2 | Goals | Prokofyeva 5 | Shanghai Oriental Sports Center, Shanghai; Attendance: 250; Referees: Flahive (AUS), Deslieres (CAN) |

| July 19, 2011; 13:30 | Match 12 | Brazil | 8–11 | Greece | Shanghai Oriental Sports Center, Shanghai; Attendance: 200; Referees: Juhász (HUN), Rotsart (USA) |
| July 19, 2011; 13:30 | Match 12 | Score by quarters: 2–3, 3–2, 1–3, 2–3 | | | Shanghai Oriental Sports Center, Shanghai; Attendance: 200; Referees: Juhász (HUN), Rotsart (USA) |
| July 19, 2011; 13:30 | Match 12 | eight players 1 | Goals | four players 2 | Shanghai Oriental Sports Center, Shanghai; Attendance: 200; Referees: Juhász (HUN), Rotsart (USA) |

| July 21, 2011; 09:30 | Match 17 | Brazil | 4–12 | Spain | Shanghai Oriental Sports Center, Shanghai; Attendance: 450; Referees: Rustamova (UZB), Margeta Boris (SLO) |
| July 21, 2011; 09:30 | Match 17 | Score by quarters: 0–3, 2–4, 0–3, 2–2 | | | Shanghai Oriental Sports Center, Shanghai; Attendance: 450; Referees: Rustamova (UZB), Margeta Boris (SLO) |
| July 21, 2011; 09:30 | Match 17 | Carvalho 2 | Goals | Gil Sorli 5 | Shanghai Oriental Sports Center, Shanghai; Attendance: 450; Referees: Rustamova (UZB), Margeta Boris (SLO) |

| July 21, 2011; 10:50 | Match 18 | Greece | 6–5 | Russia | Shanghai Oriental Sports Center, Shanghai; Attendance: 350; Referees: Borrell (ESP), Juhász (HUN) |
| July 21, 2011; 10:50 | Match 18 | Score by quarters: 2–2, 1–1, 1–1, 2–1 | | | Shanghai Oriental Sports Center, Shanghai; Attendance: 350; Referees: Borrell (ESP), Juhász (HUN) |
| July 21, 2011; 10:50 | Match 18 | Roumpesi, Antonakou 2 | Goals | Soboleva 2 | Shanghai Oriental Sports Center, Shanghai; Attendance: 350; Referees: Borrell (ESP), Juhász (HUN) |

=== Group D ===
All times are CST (UTC+8)

| Team | Pld | W | D | L | GF | GA | GD | Pts |
|---|---|---|---|---|---|---|---|---|
| Italy | 3 | 3 | 0 | 0 | 40 | 15 | +25 | 6 |
| China | 3 | 2 | 0 | 1 | 50 | 21 | +29 | 4 |
| Cuba | 3 | 0 | 1 | 2 | 19 | 40 | −21 | 1 |
| South Africa | 3 | 0 | 1 | 2 | 16 | 49 | −33 | 1 |

| July 17, 2011; 17:40 | Match 7 | Italy | 12–4 | Cuba | Shanghai Oriental Sports Center, Shanghai; Attendance: 300; Referees: Juhász (HUN), Wengenroth (SUI) |
| July 17, 2011; 17:40 | Match 7 | Score by quarters: 4–1, 2–1, 3–0, 3–2 | | | Shanghai Oriental Sports Center, Shanghai; Attendance: 300; Referees: Juhász (HUN), Wengenroth (SUI) |
| July 17, 2011; 17:40 | Match 7 | three players 3 | Goals | Hernendez Consuegra, Gutierrez More 2 | Shanghai Oriental Sports Center, Shanghai; Attendance: 300; Referees: Juhász (HUN), Wengenroth (SUI) |

| July 17, 2011; 19:00 | Match 8 | South Africa | 5–22 | China | Shanghai Oriental Sports Center, Shanghai; Attendance: 450; Referees: Deslieres (CAN), Makita (JPN) |
| July 17, 2011; 19:00 | Match 8 | Score by quarters: 1–5, 0–6, 2–5, 2–6 | | | Shanghai Oriental Sports Center, Shanghai; Attendance: 450; Referees: Deslieres (CAN), Makita (JPN) |
| July 17, 2011; 19:00 | Match 8 | White, Dendy Young 2 | Goals | Ma Huanhuan 6 | Shanghai Oriental Sports Center, Shanghai; Attendance: 450; Referees: Deslieres (CAN), Makita (JPN) |

| July 19, 2011; 17:00 | Match 13 | Italy | 18–2 | South Africa | Shanghai Oriental Sports Center, Shanghai; Attendance: 400; Referees: Peris (CRO), Rustamova (UZB) |
| July 19, 2011; 17:00 | Match 13 | Score by quarters: 4–2, 5–0, 5–0, 4–0 | | | Shanghai Oriental Sports Center, Shanghai; Attendance: 400; Referees: Peris (CRO), Rustamova (UZB) |
| July 19, 2011; 17:00 | Match 13 | Casanova 4 | Goals | Schooling, Harris 1 | Shanghai Oriental Sports Center, Shanghai; Attendance: 400; Referees: Peris (CRO), Rustamova (UZB) |

| July 19, 2011; 21:00 | Match 16 | China | 19–6 | Cuba | Shanghai Oriental Sports Center, Shanghai; Attendance: 700; Referees: Balfanbayev (KAZ), Gonzalez (PUR) |
| July 19, 2011; 21:00 | Match 16 | Score by quarters: 6–2, 4–0, 5–2, 4–2 | | | Shanghai Oriental Sports Center, Shanghai; Attendance: 700; Referees: Balfanbayev (KAZ), Gonzalez (PUR) |
| July 19, 2011; 21:00 | Match 16 | Wang Yi 4 | Goals | Hernendez Consuegra, Gutierrez More 2 | Shanghai Oriental Sports Center, Shanghai; Attendance: 700; Referees: Balfanbayev (KAZ), Gonzalez (PUR) |

| July 21, 2011; 12:10 | Match 19 | South Africa | 9–9 | Cuba | Shanghai Oriental Sports Center, Shanghai; Attendance: 250; Referees: Reemnet (NED), Makita (JPN) |
| July 21, 2011; 12:10 | Match 19 | Score by quarters: 3–3, 1–1, 1–1, 4–4 | | | Shanghai Oriental Sports Center, Shanghai; Attendance: 250; Referees: Reemnet (NED), Makita (JPN) |
| July 21, 2011; 12:10 | Match 19 | Harris 5 | Goals | Bravo Curro, Hernandez Consuegra 3 | Shanghai Oriental Sports Center, Shanghai; Attendance: 250; Referees: Reemnet (NED), Makita (JPN) |

| July 21, 2011; 21:00 | Match 24 | Italy | 10–9 | China | Shanghai Oriental Sports Center, Shanghai; Attendance: 700; Referees: Koganov (AZE), Flahive (AUS) |
| July 21, 2011; 21:00 | Match 24 | Score by quarters: 4–2, 2–1, 3–3, 1–3 | | | Shanghai Oriental Sports Center, Shanghai; Attendance: 700; Referees: Koganov (AZE), Flahive (AUS) |
| July 21, 2011; 21:00 | Match 24 | Bianconi 3 | Goals | Wang Yi 3 | Shanghai Oriental Sports Center, Shanghai; Attendance: 700; Referees: Koganov (AZE), Flahive (AUS) |

== Final rounds ==
=== Quarterfinals qualification ===
All times are CST (UTC+8)

| July 23, 2011; 12:10 | Match 27 | Netherlands | 14–6 | New Zealand | Shanghai Oriental Sports Center, Shanghai; Attendance: 350; Referees: Balfanbayev (KAZ), Cabral (BRA) |
| July 23, 2011; 12:10 | Match 27 | Score by quarters: 6–2, 2–0, 3–3, 3–1 | | | Shanghai Oriental Sports Center, Shanghai; Attendance: 350; Referees: Balfanbayev (KAZ), Cabral (BRA) |
| July 23, 2011; 12:10 | Match 27 | Cabout, van Belkum 3 | Goals | Mason, Shieprath 2 | Shanghai Oriental Sports Center, Shanghai; Attendance: 350; Referees: Balfanbayev (KAZ), Cabral (BRA) |

| July 23, 2011; 15:30 | Match 28 | Hungary | 9–10 | Australia | Shanghai Oriental Sports Center, Shanghai; Attendance: 900; Referees: Margeta (SLO), Borrell (ESP) |
| July 23, 2011; 15:30 | Match 28 | Score by quarters: 2–3, 2–2, 1–3, 4–2 | | | Shanghai Oriental Sports Center, Shanghai; Attendance: 900; Referees: Margeta (SLO), Borrell (ESP) |
| July 23, 2011; 15:30 | Match 28 | four players 2 | Goals | Webster 4 | Shanghai Oriental Sports Center, Shanghai; Attendance: 900; Referees: Margeta (SLO), Borrell (ESP) |

| July 23, 2011; 16:50 | Match 29 | Russia | 26–4 | Cuba | Shanghai Oriental Sports Center, Shanghai; Attendance: 750; Referees: Pinker (RSA), Makita (JPN) |
| July 23, 2011; 16:50 | Match 29 | Score by quarters: 5–1, 8–0, 6–1, 7–2 | | | Shanghai Oriental Sports Center, Shanghai; Attendance: 750; Referees: Pinker (RSA), Makita (JPN) |
| July 23, 2011; 16:50 | Match 29 | Lisunova 5 | Goals | Hernendez Consuegra 2 | Shanghai Oriental Sports Center, Shanghai; Attendance: 750; Referees: Pinker (RSA), Makita (JPN) |

| July 23, 2011; 21:00 | Match 30 | Spain | 6–15 | China | Shanghai Oriental Sports Center, Shanghai; Referees: Stavridis (GRE), Naumov (RUS) |
| July 23, 2011; 21:00 | Match 30 | Score by quarters: 2–7, 1–2, 2–3, 1–3 | | | Shanghai Oriental Sports Center, Shanghai; Referees: Stavridis (GRE), Naumov (RUS) |
| July 23, 2011; 21:00 | Match 30 | Gil Sorli 3 | Goals | Ma Huanhuan 5 | Shanghai Oriental Sports Center, Shanghai; Referees: Stavridis (GRE), Naumov (RUS) |

Championship bracket

Quarter-finals
July 25
United States | 7
Russia | 9
July 25
Canada | 7
China | 9
July 25
Greece | 12
Netherlands | 10
July 25
Italy | 14
Australia | 12

Semi-finals
July 27
Russia | 12
China | 13
July 27
Greece | 14
Italy | 11

Final
July 29
China | 8
Greece | 9
Third place
July 29
Russia | 8
Italy | 7

5th place bracket

Semi-finals
July 27
United States | 8
Canada | 4
July 27
Netherlands | 7
Australia | 12

5th place match
July 29
United States | 5
Australia | 10
7th match
July 29
Canada | 7
Netherlands | 8

9th place bracket

Semi-finals
July 25
New Zealand | 10
Cuba | 11
July 25
Hungary | 17
Spain | 13

9th place match
July 27
Cuba | 7
Hungary | 12
11th place match
July 27
New Zealand | 7
Spain | 15

13th place bracket

Semi-finals
July 23
Kazakhstan | 14
Uzbekistan | 13
July 23
Brazil | 10
South Africa | 9

13th place match
July 25
Kazakhstan | 9
Brazil | 5
15th place match
July 25
Uzbekistan | 5
South Africa | 6

=== 13th-16th place classification ===
All times are CST (UTC+8)

| July 23, 2011; 09:30 | Match 25 | Kazakhstan | 14–13 | Uzbekistan | Shanghai Oriental Sports Center, Shanghai; Attendance: 450; Referees: Gonzalez (PUR), Juhaz (HUN) |
| July 23, 2011; 09:30 | Match 25 | Score by quarters: 4–2, 2–4, 4–2, 4–5 | | | Shanghai Oriental Sports Center, Shanghai; Attendance: 450; Referees: Gonzalez (PUR), Juhaz (HUN) |
| July 23, 2011; 09:30 | Match 25 | Vassilyeva 4 | Goals | Halikova 8 | Shanghai Oriental Sports Center, Shanghai; Attendance: 450; Referees: Gonzalez (PUR), Juhaz (HUN) |

| July 23, 2011; 10:50 | Match 26 | Brazil | 10–9 | South Africa | Shanghai Oriental Sports Center, Shanghai; Attendance: 550; Referees: Alexandrescu (ROU), Wengenroth (SUI) |
| July 23, 2011; 10:50 | Match 26 | Score by quarters: 3–2, 3–1, 2–2, 2–4 | | | Shanghai Oriental Sports Center, Shanghai; Attendance: 550; Referees: Alexandrescu (ROU), Wengenroth (SUI) |
| July 23, 2011; 10:50 | Match 26 | Canetti, Carvalho 2 | Goals | Harris 4 | Shanghai Oriental Sports Center, Shanghai; Attendance: 550; Referees: Alexandrescu (ROU), Wengenroth (SUI) |

=== Quarterfinals ===
All times are CST (UTC+8)

| July 25, 2011; 14:00 | Match 35 | United States | 7–9 | Russia | Shanghai Oriental Sports Center, Shanghai; Attendance: 450; Referees: Tulga (TUR), Bock (GER) |
| July 25, 2011; 14:00 | Match 35 | Score by quarters: 2–0, 3–2, 1–5, 1–2 | | | Shanghai Oriental Sports Center, Shanghai; Attendance: 450; Referees: Tulga (TUR), Bock (GER) |
| July 25, 2011; 14:00 | Match 35 | Seidemann, Wenger 2 | Goals | Prokofyeva 5 | Shanghai Oriental Sports Center, Shanghai; Attendance: 450; Referees: Tulga (TUR), Bock (GER) |

| July 25, 2011; 15:20 | Match 37 | Greece | 12–10 | Netherlands | Shanghai Oriental Sports Center, Shanghai; Attendance: 350; Referees: Brgulian (MNE), Balfanbayev (KAZ) |
| July 25, 2011; 15:20 | Match 37 | Score by quarters: 3–4, 5–1, 2–3, 2–2 | | | Shanghai Oriental Sports Center, Shanghai; Attendance: 350; Referees: Brgulian (MNE), Balfanbayev (KAZ) |
| July 25, 2011; 15:20 | Match 37 | Roumpesi 3 | Goals | van Belkum 3 | Shanghai Oriental Sports Center, Shanghai; Attendance: 350; Referees: Brgulian (MNE), Balfanbayev (KAZ) |

| July 25, 2011; 16:40 | Match 38 | Italy | 14–12 | Australia | Shanghai Oriental Sports Center, Shanghai; Attendance: 550; Referees: Juhaz (HUN), Borrell (ESP) |
| July 25, 2011; 16:40 | Match 38 | Score by quarters: 0–1, 4–0, 4–6, 0–1 OT: 1–1 PSO: 5–3 | | | Shanghai Oriental Sports Center, Shanghai; Attendance: 550; Referees: Juhaz (HUN), Borrell (ESP) |
| July 25, 2011; 16:40 | Match 38 | Bianconi 4 | Goals | four players 2 | Shanghai Oriental Sports Center, Shanghai; Attendance: 550; Referees: Juhaz (HUN), Borrell (ESP) |

| July 25, 2011; 21:00 | Match 36 | Canada | 7–9 | China | Shanghai Oriental Sports Center, Shanghai; Attendance: 850; Referees: Stavridis (GRE), Caputi (ITA) |
| July 25, 2011; 21:00 | Match 36 | Score by quarters: 2–3, 2–2, 3–3, 0–1 | | | Shanghai Oriental Sports Center, Shanghai; Attendance: 850; Referees: Stavridis (GRE), Caputi (ITA) |
| July 25, 2011; 21:00 | Match 36 | Csikos 3 | Goals | Sun Yating 3 | Shanghai Oriental Sports Center, Shanghai; Attendance: 850; Referees: Stavridis (GRE), Caputi (ITA) |

=== 9th-12th place classification ===
All times are CST (UTC+8)

| July 25, 2011; 11:20 | Match 33 | New Zealand | 10–11 | Cuba | Shanghai Oriental Sports Center, Shanghai; Attendance: 300; Referees: Ni (CHN), Pinker (RSA) |
| July 25, 2011; 11:20 | Match 33 | Score by quarters: 2–3, 4–3, 3–2, 1–3 | | | Shanghai Oriental Sports Center, Shanghai; Attendance: 300; Referees: Ni (CHN), Pinker (RSA) |
| July 25, 2011; 11:20 | Match 33 | Bowry 3 | Goals | Gutierrez More 5 | Shanghai Oriental Sports Center, Shanghai; Attendance: 300; Referees: Ni (CHN), Pinker (RSA) |

| July 25, 2011; 12:40 | Match 34 | Hungary | 17–13 | Spain | Shanghai Oriental Sports Center, Shanghai; Attendance: 450; Referees: Deslieres (CAN), Wengenroth (SUI) |
| July 25, 2011; 12:40 | Match 34 | Score by quarters: 5–3, 5–3, 4–3, 3–4 | | | Shanghai Oriental Sports Center, Shanghai; Attendance: 450; Referees: Deslieres (CAN), Wengenroth (SUI) |
| July 25, 2011; 12:40 | Match 34 | Bujka 5 | Goals | Gil Sorli 5 | Shanghai Oriental Sports Center, Shanghai; Attendance: 450; Referees: Deslieres (CAN), Wengenroth (SUI) |

=== 15th place match ===
All times are CST (UTC+8)

| July 25, 2011; 8:40 | Match 31 | Uzbekistan | 5–6 | South Africa | Shanghai Oriental Sports Center, Shanghai; Attendance: 200; Referees: Gonzalez (PUR), Menendez (CUB) |
| July 25, 2011; 8:40 | Match 31 | Score by quarters: 0–1, 2–2, 2–1, 1–2 | | | Shanghai Oriental Sports Center, Shanghai; Attendance: 200; Referees: Gonzalez (PUR), Menendez (CUB) |
| July 25, 2011; 8:40 | Match 31 | five players 1 | Goals | Kay, Harris 2 | Shanghai Oriental Sports Center, Shanghai; Attendance: 200; Referees: Gonzalez (PUR), Menendez (CUB) |

=== 13th place match ===
All times are CST (UTC+8)

| July 25, 2011; 10:00 | Match 32 | Kazakhstan | 9–5 | Brazil | Shanghai Oriental Sports Center, Shanghai; Attendance: 250; Referees: Flahive (AUS), Reemnet (NED) |
| July 25, 2011; 10:00 | Match 32 | Score by quarters: 2–1, 2–2, 2–0, 3–2 | | | Shanghai Oriental Sports Center, Shanghai; Attendance: 250; Referees: Flahive (AUS), Reemnet (NED) |
| July 25, 2011; 10:00 | Match 32 | Vassilyeva, Chebotova 3 | Goals | Zablith, Coutinho 2 | Shanghai Oriental Sports Center, Shanghai; Attendance: 250; Referees: Flahive (AUS), Reemnet (NED) |

=== 5th-8th place classification ===
All times are CST (UTC+8)

| July 27, 2011; 12:10 | Match 41 | United States | 8–4 | Canada | Shanghai Oriental Sports Center, Shanghai; Attendance: 250; Referees: Naumov (RUS), Menendez (CUB) |
| July 27, 2011; 12:10 | Match 41 | Score by quarters: 2–2, 2–0, 2–1, 2–1 | | | Shanghai Oriental Sports Center, Shanghai; Attendance: 250; Referees: Naumov (RUS), Menendez (CUB) |
| July 27, 2011; 12:10 | Match 41 | Petri 2 | Goals | Csikos 2 | Shanghai Oriental Sports Center, Shanghai; Attendance: 250; Referees: Naumov (RUS), Menendez (CUB) |

| July 27, 2011; 15:30 | Match 42 | Netherlands | 7–12 | Australia | Shanghai Oriental Sports Center, Shanghai; Attendance: 900; Referees: Juhaz (HUN), Balfanbayev (KAZ) |
| July 27, 2011; 15:30 | Match 42 | Score by quarters: 1–4, 2–4, 3–3, 1–1 | | | Shanghai Oriental Sports Center, Shanghai; Attendance: 900; Referees: Juhaz (HUN), Balfanbayev (KAZ) |
| July 27, 2011; 15:30 | Match 42 | van Belkum 3 | Goals | Knox 4 | Shanghai Oriental Sports Center, Shanghai; Attendance: 900; Referees: Juhaz (HUN), Balfanbayev (KAZ) |

=== Semifinals ===
All times are CST (UTC+8)

| July 27, 2011; 16:50 | Match 44 | Greece | 14–11 | Italy | Shanghai Oriental Sports Center, Shanghai; Attendance: 950; Referees: Tulga (TUR), Borrell (ESP) |
| July 27, 2011; 16:50 | Match 44 | Score by quarters: 3–2, 5–3, 3–3, 3–3 | | | Shanghai Oriental Sports Center, Shanghai; Attendance: 950; Referees: Tulga (TUR), Borrell (ESP) |
| July 27, 2011; 16:50 | Match 44 | three players 3 | Goals | Bianconi, Rambaldi Guidasci 3 | Shanghai Oriental Sports Center, Shanghai; Attendance: 950; Referees: Tulga (TUR), Borrell (ESP) |

| July 27, 2011; 21:00 | Match 43 | Russia | 12–13 | China | Shanghai Oriental Sports Center, Shanghai; Attendance: 1,400; Referees: Margeta (SLO), Flahive (AUS) |
| July 27, 2011; 21:00 | Match 43 | Score by quarters: 3–4, 3–3, 3–2, 3–4 | | | Shanghai Oriental Sports Center, Shanghai; Attendance: 1,400; Referees: Margeta (SLO), Flahive (AUS) |
| July 27, 2011; 21:00 | Match 43 | Fedotova, Tankeeva 3 | Goals | Sun Yating, Wang Yi 4 | Shanghai Oriental Sports Center, Shanghai; Attendance: 1,400; Referees: Margeta (SLO), Flahive (AUS) |

=== 11th place match ===
All times are CST (UTC+8)

| July 27, 2011; 09:30 | Match 39 | New Zealand | 7–15 | Spain | Shanghai Oriental Sports Center, Shanghai; Attendance: 250; Referees: Deslieres (CAN), Cabral (BRA) |
| July 27, 2011; 09:30 | Match 39 | Score by quarters: 2–3, 1–6, 2–4, 2–2 | | | Shanghai Oriental Sports Center, Shanghai; Attendance: 250; Referees: Deslieres (CAN), Cabral (BRA) |
| July 27, 2011; 09:30 | Match 39 | Mason, Sieprath 2 | Goals | Gil Sorli 7 | Shanghai Oriental Sports Center, Shanghai; Attendance: 250; Referees: Deslieres (CAN), Cabral (BRA) |

=== 9th place match ===
All times are CST (UTC+8)

| July 27, 2011; 10:50 | Match 40 | Cuba | 7–12 | Hungary | Shanghai Oriental Sports Center, Shanghai; Attendance: 250; Referees: Wengenroth (SUI), Rotsart (USA) |
| July 27, 2011; 10:50 | Match 40 | Score by quarters: 2–4, 3–2, 0–5, 2–1 | | | Shanghai Oriental Sports Center, Shanghai; Attendance: 250; Referees: Wengenroth (SUI), Rotsart (USA) |
| July 27, 2011; 10:50 | Match 40 | Hernandez Consuegra, Gutierrez More 3 | Goals | Czigány 3 | Shanghai Oriental Sports Center, Shanghai; Attendance: 250; Referees: Wengenroth (SUI), Rotsart (USA) |

=== 7th place match ===
All times are CST (UTC+8)

| July 29, 2011; 09:30 | Match 45 | Canada | 7–8 | Netherlands | Shanghai Oriental Sports Center, Shanghai; Attendance: 200; Referees: Koryzna (POL), Pinker (RSA) |
| July 29, 2011; 09:30 | Match 45 | Score by quarters: 2–0, 1–3, 3–4, 1–1 | | | Shanghai Oriental Sports Center, Shanghai; Attendance: 200; Referees: Koryzna (POL), Pinker (RSA) |
| July 29, 2011; 09:30 | Match 45 | Csikos 3 | Goals | three players 2 | Shanghai Oriental Sports Center, Shanghai; Attendance: 200; Referees: Koryzna (POL), Pinker (RSA) |

=== 5th place match ===
All times are CST (UTC+8)

| July 29, 2011; 10:50 | Match 46 | United States | 5–10 | Australia | Shanghai Oriental Sports Center, Shanghai; Attendance: 250; Referees: Deslieres (CAN), Peris (CRO) |
| July 29, 2011; 10:50 | Match 46 | Score by quarters: 2–1, 0–4, 2–4, 1–1 | | | Shanghai Oriental Sports Center, Shanghai; Attendance: 250; Referees: Deslieres (CAN), Peris (CRO) |
| July 29, 2011; 10:50 | Match 46 | Villa, Dries 2 | Goals | Knox 4 | Shanghai Oriental Sports Center, Shanghai; Attendance: 250; Referees: Deslieres (CAN), Peris (CRO) |

=== Bronze medal match ===
All times are CST (UTC+8)

| July 29, 2011; 16:00 | Match 47 | Russia | 8–7 | Italy | Shanghai Oriental Sports Center, Shanghai; Attendance: 1,000; Referees: Gyorgy Juhaz (HUN), Steven Rotsart (USA) |
| July 29, 2011; 16:00 | Match 47 | Score by quarters: 4–0, 2–1, 2–6, 0–0 | | | Shanghai Oriental Sports Center, Shanghai; Attendance: 1,000; Referees: Gyorgy Juhaz (HUN), Steven Rotsart (USA) |
| July 29, 2011; 16:00 | Match 47 | Belyaeva 3 Prokofyeva, Konukh 2 Ryzhova-Alenicheva 1 | Goals | Casanova, Bianconi 2 Abbate, Savioli, Frassinetti 1 | Shanghai Oriental Sports Center, Shanghai; Attendance: 1,000; Referees: Gyorgy Juhaz (HUN), Steven Rotsart (USA) |

=== Gold medal match ===
All times are CST (UTC+8)

| July 29, 2011; 21:00 | Match 48 | China | 8–9 | Greece | Shanghai Oriental Sports Center, Shanghai; Attendance: 1,600; Referees: Massimiliano Caputi (ITA), Mario Brgulian (MNE) |
| July 29, 2011; 21:00 | Match 48 | Score by quarters: 2–2, 0–2, 4–4, 2–1 | | | Shanghai Oriental Sports Center, Shanghai; Attendance: 1,600; Referees: Massimiliano Caputi (ITA), Mario Brgulian (MNE) |
| July 29, 2011; 21:00 | Match 48 | Liu Ping, Wang Yi 2 Teng Fei, Sun Yujun, He Jin, Song Donglun 1 | Goals | Asimaki, Roumpesi 3 Melidoni, Liosi, Manolioudaki 1 | Shanghai Oriental Sports Center, Shanghai; Attendance: 1,600; Referees: Massimiliano Caputi (ITA), Mario Brgulian (MNE) |

== Ranking and statistics ==
=== Final ranking ===
| Rank | Team |
|---|---|
| 1st place, gold medalist(s) | Greece |
| 2nd place, silver medalist(s) | China |
| 3rd place, bronze medalist(s) | Russia |
| 4 | Italy |
| 5 | Australia |
| 6 | United States |
| 7 | Netherlands |
| 8 | Canada |
| 9 | Hungary |
| 10 | Cuba |
| 11 | Spain |
| 12 | New Zealand |
| 13 | Kazakhstan |
| 14 | Brazil |
| 15 | South Africa |
| 16 | Uzbekistan |

2011 Women's Water Polo World champions

Greece
First title

Team Roster

Eleni Kouvdou, Christina Tsoukala, Antiopi Melidoni, Ilektra Psouni, Kyriaki Liosi (C), Alkisti Avramidou, Alexandra Asimaki, Antigoni Roumpesi, Angeliki Gerolymou, Triantafyllia Manolioudaki, Stavroula Antonakou, Georgia Lara, Eleni Goula. Head Coach: Giorgos Morfesis

=== Awards ===
Most Valuable Player

- (China) Ma Huanhuan

Best Goalscorer

- (Spain) Blanca Gil – 25 goals

Media All-Star Team

- (Greece) Eleni Kouvdou – Goalkeeper
- (China) Sun Yating – Centre forward
- (China) Ma Huanhuan
- (Spain) Blanca Gil
- (Greece) Antigoni Roumpesi
- (Russia) Ekaterina Prokofyeva
- (Italy) Roberta Bianconi
