= Liu Ping (water polo) =

Chinese water polo player (born 1987)

Personal information
- Nationality: Chinese
- Born: May 1, 1987 (age 39) Beijing, China

Sport
- Country: China
- Sport: Water polo
Medal record
Women's water polo
Representing China
World Championships
Silver medal – second place	2011 Shanghai	Team
World Cup
Bronze medal – third place	2010 Christchurch	Team
Universiade
Gold medal – first place	2009 Belgrade	Team
Gold medal – first place	2011 Shenzhen	Team

Liu Ping (born 1 May 1987 in Beijing) is a Chinese water polo player. She was part of the silver medal-winning team at the 2007 World Junior Championship. She also competed at the 2008 and 2012 Summer Olympics.

== See also ==
- List of World Aquatics Championships medalists in water polo
