= Eleni Kouvdou =

Greek water polo player

Personal information
- Born: 9 August 1989 (age 36) Greece
- Height: 175 cm (5 ft 9 in)
- Weight: 64 kg (141 lb)

Sport
- Sport: water polo
- Club: NC Vouliagmeni
Medal record
Women's water polo
Representing Greece
World Championship
Gold medal – first place	2011 Shanghai	Team competition
- Updated on 19 August 2015

Eleni Kouvdou (born 9 August 1989) is a Greek water polo player. She was part of the Greek team that won the gold medal at the 2011 World Aquatics Championships.

== See also ==
- List of world champions in women's water polo
- List of World Aquatics Championships medalists in water polo
