= Ma Huanhuan =

Chinese water polo player (born 1990)

Personal information
- Nationality: Chinese
- Born: January 13, 1990 (age 36) Guangxi, China

Sport
- Country: China
- Sport: Water polo
Medal record
Women's Water polo
Representing China
World Championships
| Silver medal – second place | 2011 Shanghai | Team |
World Cup
| Bronze medal – third place | 2010 Christchurch | Team |
Universiade
| Gold medal – first place | 2009 Belgrade | Team |
| Gold medal – first place | 2011 Shenzhen | Team |

Ma Huanhuan (born 13 January 1990 in Guangxi) is a female Chinese professional water polo player who was part of the silver medal winning team at the 2007 World Junior Championship. She has competed at the 2008, 2012 and 2016 Summer Olympics. She is a leading goalscorer in Olympic water polo history, with 37 goals.

== See also ==
- China women's Olympic water polo team records and statistics
- List of players who have appeared in multiple women's Olympic water polo tournaments
- List of women's Olympic water polo tournament top goalscorers
- List of World Aquatics Championships medalists in water polo
