= Antigoni Roumpesi =

Greek water polo player

Personal information
- Born: 19 July 1983 (age 42) Athens, Greece
- Height: 177 cm (5 ft 10 in)
- Weight: 80 kg (176 lb)

Sport
- Club: NC Vouliagmeni
Medal record
Women's water polo
Representing Greece
Olympic Games
Silver medal – second place	2004 Athens	Team
World Championship
Gold medal – first place	2011 Shanghai	Team
FINA Water Polo World League
Gold medal – first place	2005 Kirishi	Team
European Water Polo Championship
Silver medal – second place	2010 Zagreb	Team
Silver medal – second place	2012 Eindhoven	Team

Antigoni Roumpesi or Antigoni Roumbesi (Greek: Αντιγόνη Ρουμπέση, born 19 July 1983) is a Greek water polo player, World Aquatics gold champion and Olympic silver medalist with the Greece women's national water polo team.

She received a silver medal at the 2004 Summer Olympics in Athens.

She received a gold medal with the Greece women's national water polo team at the 2005 FINA Women's Water Polo World League in Kirishi, where she also was top scorer with 31 goals.

At the 2007 FINA Women's Water Polo World League Roumpesi scored 21 goals and was ranked number 3 on the top scoring list, while the Greek team finished 4th in the competition.

At the 2010 Women's European Water Polo Championship in Zagreb Croatia, she scored 9 goals with the Greek team that won the silver medal.

At the water polo championship at the 2011 World Aquatics championships in Shanghai, China, Roumpesi scored 15 goals with the Greek team that won the gold medal.

At the 2012 Women's European Water Polo Championship in Eindhoven Netherlands, she won the silver medal with the Greek team.

== See also ==
- Greece women's Olympic water polo team records and statistics
- List of Olympic medalists in water polo (women)
- List of world champions in women's water polo
- List of World Aquatics Championships medalists in water polo
