= 2010 FINA Women's Water Polo World Cup =

Tournament details
- Host country: New Zealand
- Venue: 1 (in 1 host city)
- Dates: 17–22 August 2010
- Teams: 8 (from 4 confederations)

Final positions
- Champions: United States (2nd title)
- Runners-up: Australia
- Third place: China
- Fourth place: Russia

Tournament statistics
- Matches played: 24
- Goals scored: 475 (19.79 per match)
- Top scorers: (China) Gao Ao (16 goals)

Awards
- Best player: (Australia) Gemma Beadsworth

The 2010 FINA Women's Water Polo World Cup was the 15th edition of the event, organised by the world's governing body in aquatics, the International Swimming Federation (FINA). The event took place in Christchurch, New Zealand from 17 to 22 August 2010.

The United States won the gold medal, after defeating Australia 6–3 in the final. China captured bronze, beating Russia 11–9.

== Format ==
8 teams qualified for the 2010 FINA World Cup. They are split into two groups of 4 teams. After playing a Round-robin every team advanced to the quarterfinals. The best ranked team of Group A played against the fourth ranked team of Group B, the second ranked team of Group A against the third ranked team of Group B the third ranked team of Group A against the second ranked team of Group B and the fourth ranked team of Group A against the best ranked team of Group B. The winners of those quarterfinals advanced to the Semis and played out the champion while the losers of the quarterfinals competed in placement matches.

== Groups ==
Group A	Group B
Hungary; Greece; China; Canada	New Zealand; United States; Russia; Australia

== Preliminary round ==
=== Group A ===
All times are NZST (UTC+12)

	Team	G	W	D	L	GF	GA	Diff	Points
1.	China	3	3	0	0	31	22	+9	6
2.	Canada	3	2	0	1	32	22	+10	4
3.	Hungary	3	1	0	2	31	36	−5	2
4.	Greece	3	0	0	3	21	35	−14	0

17 August 2010; 16:30	Report	Greece	7–11	China	Christchurch, New Zealand; Referees: Drury (USA), Krapivin (RUS)
17 August 2010; 16:30	Report	Score by quarters: 2–1, 3–3, 1–4, 1–3			Christchurch, New Zealand; Referees: Drury (USA), Krapivin (RUS)
17 August 2010; 16:30	Report	Roumpesi 3	Goals	Liu, Gao, Ma 3	Christchurch, New Zealand; Referees: Drury (USA), Krapivin (RUS)

17 August 2010; 18:00	Report	Hungary	10–14	Canada	Christchurch, New Zealand; Referees: Hart (AUS), Matache (ROU)
17 August 2010; 18:00	Report	Score by quarters: 3–4, 3–3, 4–4, 0–3			Christchurch, New Zealand; Referees: Hart (AUS), Matache (ROU)
17 August 2010; 18:00	Report	Valkai 3	Goals	Bekhazi, Perrault, Robinson, Campbell, Radu 2	Christchurch, New Zealand; Referees: Hart (AUS), Matache (ROU)

18 August 2010; 15:00	Report	Hungary	8–11	China	Christchurch, New Zealand; Referees: Waldo (NZL), Matache (ROU)
18 August 2010; 15:00	Report	Score by quarters: 1–4, 4–2, 1–2, 2–3			Christchurch, New Zealand; Referees: Waldo (NZL), Matache (ROU)
18 August 2010; 15:00	Report	Valkai 3	Goals	Sun 3	Christchurch, New Zealand; Referees: Waldo (NZL), Matache (ROU)

18 August 2010; 18:00	Report	Greece	3–11	Canada	Christchurch, New Zealand; Referees: Krapivin (RUS), Makita (JPN)
18 August 2010; 18:00	Report	Score by quarters: 1–5, 0–2, 1–2, 1–2			Christchurch, New Zealand; Referees: Krapivin (RUS), Makita (JPN)
18 August 2010; 18:00	Report	Asimaki 2	Goals	Eggens 5	Christchurch, New Zealand; Referees: Krapivin (RUS), Makita (JPN)

19 August 2010; 15:00	Report	Greece	11–13	Hungary	Christchurch, New Zealand; Referees: Drury (USA), Waldow (NZL)
19 August 2010; 15:00	Report	Score by quarters: 4–2, 2–4, 1–4, 4–3			Christchurch, New Zealand; Referees: Drury (USA), Waldow (NZL)
19 August 2010; 15:00	Report	Tsoukala, Asimaki 3	Goals	Bujka 4	Christchurch, New Zealand; Referees: Drury (USA), Waldow (NZL)

19 August 2010; 18:00	Report	China	9–7	Canada	Christchurch, New Zealand; Referees: Matache (ROU), Hart (AUS)
19 August 2010; 18:00	Report	Score by quarters: 2–3, 4–2, 3–2, 0–0			Christchurch, New Zealand; Referees: Matache (ROU), Hart (AUS)
19 August 2010; 18:00	Report	Sun 3	Goals	Csikos 5	Christchurch, New Zealand; Referees: Matache (ROU), Hart (AUS)

=== Group B ===
All times are NZST (UTC+12)

	Team	G	W	D	L	GF	GA	Diff	Points
1.	Australia	3	3	0	0	34	17	+17	6
2.	United States	3	2	0	1	37	25	+12	4
3.	Russia	3	1	0	2	31	33	−2	2
4.	New Zealand	3	0	0	3	21	48	−27	0

17 August 2010; 15:00	Report	United States	14–10	Russia	Christchurch, New Zealand; Referees: Fekete (HUN), Roy (CAN)
17 August 2010; 15:00	Report	Score by quarters: 3–1, 4–2, 4–5, 3–2			Christchurch, New Zealand; Referees: Fekete (HUN), Roy (CAN)
17 August 2010; 15:00	Report	Silver, Rolun, Craig 3	Goals	Konukh 4	Christchurch, New Zealand; Referees: Fekete (HUN), Roy (CAN)

17 August 2010; 19:30	Report	New Zealand	4–17	Australia	Christchurch, New Zealand; Referees: Makita (JPN), Tan (SIN)
17 August 2010; 19:30	Report	Score by quarters: 2–4, 1–3, 0–5, 1–5			Christchurch, New Zealand; Referees: Makita (JPN), Tan (SIN)
17 August 2010; 19:30	Report	Smith 2	Goals	Southern 4	Christchurch, New Zealand; Referees: Makita (JPN), Tan (SIN)

18 August 2010; 16:30	Report	United States	5–7	Australia	Christchurch, New Zealand; Referees: Vasileiou (GRE), Fekete (HUN)
18 August 2010; 16:30	Report	Score by quarters: 1–1, 0–3, 3–1, 1–2			Christchurch, New Zealand; Referees: Vasileiou (GRE), Fekete (HUN)

18 August 2010; 19:30	Report	New Zealand	9–13	Russia	Christchurch, New Zealand; Referees: Wei (CHN), Tan (SIN)
18 August 2010; 19:30	Report	Score by quarters: 0–2, 3–4, 2–3, 4–4			Christchurch, New Zealand; Referees: Wei (CHN), Tan (SIN)
18 August 2010; 19:30	Report	Smith, Sieprath, Hudson 2	Goals	Soboleva 3	Christchurch, New Zealand; Referees: Wei (CHN), Tan (SIN)

19 August 2010; 16:30	Report	Russia	8–10	Australia	Christchurch, New Zealand; Referees: Fekete (HUN), Vasileiou (GRE)
19 August 2010; 16:30	Report	Score by quarters: 3–0, 2–4, 2–5, 1–1			Christchurch, New Zealand; Referees: Fekete (HUN), Vasileiou (GRE)
19 August 2010; 16:30	Report	Ryzhova-Alenicheva, Soboleva, Ivanova 2	Goals	Webster, Ralph, Zagame 2	Christchurch, New Zealand; Referees: Fekete (HUN), Vasileiou (GRE)

19 August 2010; 19:30	Report	United States	17–8	New Zealand	Christchurch, New Zealand; Referees: Roy (CAN), Ni (CHN)
19 August 2010; 19:30	Report	Score by quarters: 3–2, 3–0, 6–1, 5–5			Christchurch, New Zealand; Referees: Roy (CAN), Ni (CHN)
19 August 2010; 19:30	Report	Dries 3	Goals	Cox, Sieprath, Bowry 2	Christchurch, New Zealand; Referees: Roy (CAN), Ni (CHN)

== Final round ==
5th–8th place bracket

5th-8th place classification
21 August
Canada	13
Greece	12
21 August
Hungary	11
New Zealand	4

5th place match
22 August
Canada	18
Hungary	16
7th place match
22 August
Greece	16
New Zealand	6

=== 5th–8th place classification ===
All times are NZST (UTC+12)

21 August 2010; 15:00	Canada	13–12	Greece	Christchurch, New Zealand; Referees: Ni (CHN), Drury (USA)
21 August 2010; 15:00	Score by quarters: 4–5, 2–2, 2–3, 5–2			Christchurch, New Zealand; Referees: Ni (CHN), Drury (USA)
21 August 2010; 15:00	Csikos, Békhazi, Perreault 3	Goals	Asimaki, Roumpesi 3	Christchurch, New Zealand; Referees: Ni (CHN), Drury (USA)

21 August 2010; 14:30	Hungary	11–4	New Zealand	Christchurch, New Zealand; Referees: Krapivin (RUS), Makita (JPN)
21 August 2010; 14:30	Score by quarters: 3–0, 2–1, 4–1, 2–2			Christchurch, New Zealand; Referees: Krapivin (RUS), Makita (JPN)
21 August 2010; 14:30	Keszthelyi 3	Goals	Bowry 2	Christchurch, New Zealand; Referees: Krapivin (RUS), Makita (JPN)

=== 7th place match ===
All times are NZST (UTC+12)

22 August 2010; 09:00	Greece	16–8	New Zealand	Christchurch, New Zealand; Referees: Hart (AUS), Roy (CAN)
22 August 2010; 09:00	Score by quarters: 4–4, 5–1, 4–0, 3–3			Christchurch, New Zealand; Referees: Hart (AUS), Roy (CAN)
22 August 2010; 09:00	Tsoukala, Avramidou, Antonakou 3	Goals	Lewis 2	Christchurch, New Zealand; Referees: Hart (AUS), Roy (CAN)

=== 5th place match ===
All times are NZST (UTC+12)

22 August 2010; 10:30	Canada	18–16 (OT, PSO)	Hungary	Christchurch, New Zealand; Referees: Krapivin (RUS), Ni (CHN)
22 August 2010; 10:30	Score by quarters: 5–3, 1–2, 2–2, 2–3 OT: 3–3 PSO: 5-3			Christchurch, New Zealand; Referees: Krapivin (RUS), Ni (CHN)
22 August 2010; 10:30	Alogbo, Békhazi 4	Goals	Szűcs, Keszthelyi 4	Christchurch, New Zealand; Referees: Krapivin (RUS), Ni (CHN)

Championship bracket

Quarter-finals
20 August
China	11
New Zealand	3
20 August
United States	10
Hungary	5
20 August
Canada	11
Russia	12
20 August
Australia	11
Greece	7

Semi-finals
21 August
China	9
United States	10
21 August
Russia	10
Australia	11

Final
22 August
United States	6
Australia	3
Third place
22 August
China	11
Russia	9

=== Quarterfinals ===
All times are NZST (UTC+12)

20 August 2010; 15:00	Canada	11–12	Russia	Christchurch, New Zealand; Referees: Matache (ROU), Vasileiou (GRE)
20 August 2010; 15:00	Score by quarters: 5–4, 2–3, 2–2, 2–3			Christchurch, New Zealand; Referees: Matache (ROU), Vasileiou (GRE)
20 August 2010; 15:00	Csikos 4	Goals	Ivanova 4	Christchurch, New Zealand; Referees: Matache (ROU), Vasileiou (GRE)

20 August 2010; 16:30	Hungary	5–10	United States	Christchurch, New Zealand; Referees: Hart (AUS), Krapivin (RUS)
20 August 2010; 16:30	Score by quarters: 0–2, 2–1, 2–4, 1–3			Christchurch, New Zealand; Referees: Hart (AUS), Krapivin (RUS)
20 August 2010; 16:30	five players 1	Goals	four players 2	Christchurch, New Zealand; Referees: Hart (AUS), Krapivin (RUS)

20 August 2010; 18:00	Greece	7–11	Australia	Christchurch, New Zealand; Referees: Hart (NZL), Makita (JPN)
20 August 2010; 18:00	Score by quarters: 2–2, 1–2, 2–4, 2–3			Christchurch, New Zealand; Referees: Hart (NZL), Makita (JPN)
20 August 2010; 18:00	Gerolymou 2	Goals	Beadsworth 3	Christchurch, New Zealand; Referees: Hart (NZL), Makita (JPN)

20 August 2010; 19:30	China	11–3	New Zealand	Christchurch, New Zealand; Referees: Drury (USA), Hong (SIN)
20 August 2010; 19:30	Score by quarters: 3–0, 3–0, 2–1, 3–2			Christchurch, New Zealand; Referees: Drury (USA), Hong (SIN)
20 August 2010; 19:30	Gao Ao 5	Goals	three players 1	Christchurch, New Zealand; Referees: Drury (USA), Hong (SIN)

=== Semifinals ===
All times are NZST (UTC+12)

21 August 2010; 18:00	Russia	10–11	Australia	Christchurch, New Zealand; Referees: Vasileiou (GRE), Roy (CAN)
21 August 2010; 18:00	Score by quarters: 2–2, 3–4, 3–3, 2–2			Christchurch, New Zealand; Referees: Vasileiou (GRE), Roy (CAN)
21 August 2010; 18:00	Ryzhova 3	Goals	Zagame 3	Christchurch, New Zealand; Referees: Vasileiou (GRE), Roy (CAN)

21 August 2010; 19:30	United States	10–9	China	Christchurch, New Zealand; Referees: Matache (ROU), Fekete (HUN)
21 August 2010; 19:30	Score by quarters: 3–1, 3–3, 2–2, 2–3			Christchurch, New Zealand; Referees: Matache (ROU), Fekete (HUN)
21 August 2010; 19:30	Mathewson 3	Goals	Gao Ao 5	Christchurch, New Zealand; Referees: Matache (ROU), Fekete (HUN)

=== Bronze medal match ===
All times are NZST (UTC+12)

22 August 2010; 12:00	China	11–9	Russia	Christchurch, New Zealand; Referees: Waldow (NZL), Matache (ROU)
22 August 2010; 12:00	Score by quarters: 3–1, 3–2, 5–3, 0–3			Christchurch, New Zealand; Referees: Waldow (NZL), Matache (ROU)
22 August 2010; 12:00	three players 2	Goals	Glyzina 5	Christchurch, New Zealand; Referees: Waldow (NZL), Matache (ROU)

=== Gold medal match ===
All times are NZST (UTC+12)

22 August 2010; 14:00	United States	6–3	Australia	Christchurch, New Zealand; Referees: Vasileiou (GRE), Fekete (HUN)
22 August 2010; 14:00	Score by quarters: 3–0, 3–0, 0–2, 0–1			Christchurch, New Zealand; Referees: Vasileiou (GRE), Fekete (HUN)
22 August 2010; 14:00	Steffens, Mathewson, Silver, Windes, Rulon, Dries 1	Goals	Beadsworth, Knox, Zagame 1	Christchurch, New Zealand; Referees: Vasileiou (GRE), Fekete (HUN)

== Final standings ==
RANK	TEAM
	United States
	Australia
	China
4.	Russia
5.	Canada
6.	Hungary
7.	Greece
8.	New Zealand

2010 Women's FINA Water Polo World Cup

United States
Second title

Team Roster

Betsey Armstrong, Anne Belden, Brenda Villa, Maggie Steffens, Juliet Moss, Courtney Mathewson, Lolo Silver, Elsie Windes, Kelly Rulon, Annika Dries, Kami Craig, Melissa Seidemann, Emily Feher. Head coach: Adam Krikorian.

== Individual awards ==
- Most Valuable Player
  - Gemma Beadsworth (AUS)
- Best Goalkeeper
  - Yang Jun (CHN)
- Best Scorer
  - Gao Ao (CHN) – 16 goals
- Tournament team
  - Yang Jun (CHN) – Goalkeeper
  - Kami Craig (USA) – Centre forward
  - Gemma Beadsworth (AUS)
  - Gao Ao (CHN)
  - Joelle Bekhazi (CAN)
  - Ágnes Valkai (HUN)
  - Sofia Konukh (RUS)
