= Water polo at the 2011 Summer Universiade – Women's tournament =

Water polo at the XXVI Summer Universiade

Medalists
1st place, gold medalist(s)		China
2nd place, silver medalist(s)		United States
3rd place, bronze medalist(s)		Russia

The women's tournament of water polo at the 2011 Summer Universiade at Shenzhen, China began on August 12 and ended on August 22.

== Teams ==
Americas	Asia	Europe	Oceania
Canada; Mexico; United States	China	France; Great Britain; Italy; Russia	Australia

== Preliminary round ==
Will play for places 7–9

=== Group A ===
Team	Pld	W	D	L	GF	GA	GD	Pts
China	3	3	0	0	43	23	+20	6
Italy	3	2	0	1	21	28	−7	4
Canada	3	0	1	2	26	31	−5	1
Great Britain	3	0	1	2	25	33	−8	1

August 12, 2011; 11:20	Report	Canada	8–8	Great Britain	Natatorium of Bao An District; Referees: Collantoni (ITA), Werner (BRA)
August 12, 2011; 11:20	Report	Score by quarters: 1–1, 2–3, 3–2, 2–2			Natatorium of Bao An District; Referees: Collantoni (ITA), Werner (BRA)
August 12, 2011; 11:20	Report	Baron La Salle 4	Goals	Gibson Byrne, Winstanley Smith 2	Natatorium of Bao An District; Referees: Collantoni (ITA), Werner (BRA)

August 12, 2011; 14:00	Report	China	13–3	Italy	Natatorium of Bao An District; Referees: Gerzanich (RUS), Peila (USA)
August 12, 2011; 14:00	Report	Score by quarters: 4–0, 3–0, 2–1, 4–2			Natatorium of Bao An District; Referees: Gerzanich (RUS), Peila (USA)
August 12, 2011; 14:00	Report	Ma 4	Goals	Motta 2	Natatorium of Bao An District; Referees: Gerzanich (RUS), Peila (USA)

August 14, 2011; 16:20	Report	Canada	6–8	Italy	Natatorium of Bao An District; Referees: Delon (FRA), Varivodskiy (RUS)
August 14, 2011; 16:20	Report	Score by quarters: 0–4, 3–1, 1–2, 2–1			Natatorium of Bao An District; Referees: Delon (FRA), Varivodskiy (RUS)
August 14, 2011; 16:20	Report	M. Eggens 5	Goals	Radicchi, Dufour 2	Natatorium of Bao An District; Referees: Delon (FRA), Varivodskiy (RUS)

August 14, 2011; 19:00	Report	China	15–8	Great Britain	Natatorium of Bao An District; Referees: Bartels (AUS), Peila (USA)
August 14, 2011; 19:00	Report	Score by quarters: 2–3, 7–2, 4–1, 2–2			Natatorium of Bao An District; Referees: Bartels (AUS), Peila (USA)
August 14, 2011; 19:00	Report	Ma 6	Goals	Snell, Gibson Byrne, Clayton 2	Natatorium of Bao An District; Referees: Bartels (AUS), Peila (USA)

August 16, 2011; 17:40	Report	Great Britain	9–10	Italy	Natatorium of Bao An District; Referees: Varivodskiy (RUS), Bonnay (FRA)
August 16, 2011; 17:40	Report	Score by quarters: 5–3, 2–3, 1–1, 1–3			Natatorium of Bao An District; Referees: Varivodskiy (RUS), Bonnay (FRA)
August 16, 2011; 17:40	Report	Snell 4	Goals	Radicchi 4	Natatorium of Bao An District; Referees: Varivodskiy (RUS), Bonnay (FRA)

August 16, 2011; 19:00	Report	Canada	12–15	China	Natatorium of Bao An District; Referees: Hodgers (AUS), Callejas Perez (MEX)
August 16, 2011; 19:00	Report	Score by quarters: 3–5, 1–4, 4–4, 4–2			Natatorium of Bao An District; Referees: Hodgers (AUS), Callejas Perez (MEX)
August 16, 2011; 19:00	Report	M. Eggens 6	Goals	Wang Yi 4	Natatorium of Bao An District; Referees: Hodgers (AUS), Callejas Perez (MEX)

=== Group B ===
Team	Pld	W	D	L	GF	GA	GD	Pts
United States	4	4	0	0	42	30	+12	8
Russia	4	3	0	1	54	37	+17	6
Australia	4	1	1	2	34	32	+2	3
Mexico	4	1	1	2	37	48	−11	3
France	4	0	0	4	28	48	−20	0

August 12, 2011; 10:00	Report	France	7–8	Mexico	Natatorium of Bao An District; Referees: Cao (CHN), Hodgers (AUS)
August 12, 2011; 10:00	Report	Score by quarters: 1–3, 1–1, 3–2, 2–2			Natatorium of Bao An District; Referees: Cao (CHN), Hodgers (AUS)
August 12, 2011; 10:00	Report	Clerc 3	Goals	Carrillo 4	Natatorium of Bao An District; Referees: Cao (CHN), Hodgers (AUS)

August 12, 2011; 12:40	Report	Australia	6–8	United States	Natatorium of Bao An District; Referees: Mackay (CAN), Teixido Bermudez (ESP)
August 12, 2011; 12:40	Report	Score by quarters: 1–3, 2–3, 2–2, 1–0			Natatorium of Bao An District; Referees: Mackay (CAN), Teixido Bermudez (ESP)
August 12, 2011; 12:40	Report	Brightwell 4	Goals	Lo 3	Natatorium of Bao An District; Referees: Mackay (CAN), Teixido Bermudez (ESP)

August 13, 2011; 18:30	Report	United States	10–6	France	Natatorium of Bao An District; Referees: Tan (SIN), Vogel (HUN)
August 13, 2011; 18:30	Report	Score by quarters: 3–2, 1–0, 3–1, 3–3			Natatorium of Bao An District; Referees: Tan (SIN), Vogel (HUN)
August 13, 2011; 18:30	Report	Reynolds, Dan, Menon 2	Goals	Guillet 3	Natatorium of Bao An District; Referees: Tan (SIN), Vogel (HUN)

August 13, 2011; 19:50	Report	Russia	9–4	Australia	Natatorium of Bao An District; Referees: Brasiliano (ITA), Littlejohn (GBR)
August 13, 2011; 19:50	Report	Score by quarters: 2–0, 3–2, 2–1, 2–1			Natatorium of Bao An District; Referees: Brasiliano (ITA), Littlejohn (GBR)
August 13, 2011; 19:50	Report	Antonova 3	Goals	Wikman 3	Natatorium of Bao An District; Referees: Brasiliano (ITA), Littlejohn (GBR)

August 14, 2011; 15:00	Report	Mexico	8–12	United States	Natatorium of Bao An District; Referees: Cao (CHN), Collantoni (ITA)
August 14, 2011; 15:00	Report	Score by quarters: 4–5, 0–3, 2–3, 2–1			Natatorium of Bao An District; Referees: Cao (CHN), Collantoni (ITA)
August 14, 2011; 15:00	Report	P. Orozco 3	Goals	Dan 3	Natatorium of Bao An District; Referees: Cao (CHN), Collantoni (ITA)

August 14, 2011; 17:40	Report	France	9–15	Russia	Natatorium of Bao An District; Referees: Shi (CHN), Tan (SIN)
August 14, 2011; 17:40	Report	Score by quarters: 3–4, 1–4, 2–4, 3–3			Natatorium of Bao An District; Referees: Shi (CHN), Tan (SIN)
August 14, 2011; 17:40	Report	Hernandez, Guillet 4	Goals	Belova, Karpovich 4	Natatorium of Bao An District; Referees: Shi (CHN), Tan (SIN)

August 15, 2011; 18:30	Report	Russia	20–12	Mexico	Natatorium of Bao An District; Referees: Stajkovic (MKD), Sungu (TUR)
August 15, 2011; 18:30	Report	Score by quarters: 3–4, 5–2, 5–3, 7–3			Natatorium of Bao An District; Referees: Stajkovic (MKD), Sungu (TUR)
August 15, 2011; 18:30	Report	Karpovich 8	Goals	S. Orozco, P. Orozco 3	Natatorium of Bao An District; Referees: Stajkovic (MKD), Sungu (TUR)

August 15, 2011; 19:50	Report	Australia	15–6	France	Natatorium of Bao An District; Referees: Stankevitch (USA), Shiosaki (JPN)
August 15, 2011; 19:50	Report	Score by quarters: 0–2, 6–2, 7–0, 2–2			Natatorium of Bao An District; Referees: Stankevitch (USA), Shiosaki (JPN)
August 15, 2011; 19:50	Report	Brightwell 5	Goals	Guillet, Sacre 2	Natatorium of Bao An District; Referees: Stankevitch (USA), Shiosaki (JPN)

August 16, 2011; 15:00	Report	Mexico	9–9	Australia	Natatorium of Bao An District; Referees: Vogel (HUN), Shi (CHN)
August 16, 2011; 15:00	Report	Score by quarters: 2–2, 1–1, 2–1, 4–5			Natatorium of Bao An District; Referees: Vogel (HUN), Shi (CHN)
August 16, 2011; 15:00	Report	P. Orozco 5	Goals	Wikman 3	Natatorium of Bao An District; Referees: Vogel (HUN), Shi (CHN)

August 16, 2011; 16:20	Report	Russia	10–12	United States	Natatorium of Bao An District; Referees: Littlejohn (GBR), Teixido Bermudez (ESP)
August 16, 2011; 16:20	Report	Score by quarters: 4–4, 1–1, 4–2, 1–5			Natatorium of Bao An District; Referees: Littlejohn (GBR), Teixido Bermudez (ESP)
August 16, 2011; 16:20	Report	Antonova, Vylegzhanina 3	Goals	Dan 4	Natatorium of Bao An District; Referees: Littlejohn (GBR), Teixido Bermudez (ESP)

== Quarterfinals ==
August 18, 2011; 10:00	Report	Italy	4–3	Australia	Natatorium of Bao An District; Referees: Gerzanich (RUS), Werner (BRA)
August 18, 2011; 10:00	Report	Score by quarters: 1–1, 1–0, 1–0, 1–2			Natatorium of Bao An District; Referees: Gerzanich (RUS), Werner (BRA)
August 18, 2011; 10:00	Report	four players 1	Goals	Gofers 2	Natatorium of Bao An District; Referees: Gerzanich (RUS), Werner (BRA)

August 18, 2011; 11:30	Report	Canada	7–9	Russia	Natatorium of Bao An District; Referees: Bonnay (FRA), Shiosaki (JPN)
August 18, 2011; 11:30	Report	Score by quarters: 1–2, 3–1, 1–3, 2–3			Natatorium of Bao An District; Referees: Bonnay (FRA), Shiosaki (JPN)
August 18, 2011; 11:30	Report	Morisseau 3	Goals	Vylegzhanina 3	Natatorium of Bao An District; Referees: Bonnay (FRA), Shiosaki (JPN)

August 18, 2011; 13:00	Report	China	16–8	Mexico	Natatorium of Bao An District; Referees: Stankevitch (USA), Bartels (AUS)
August 18, 2011; 13:00	Report	Score by quarters: 1–2, 4–1, 6–2, 5–3			Natatorium of Bao An District; Referees: Stankevitch (USA), Bartels (AUS)
August 18, 2011; 13:00	Report	Sun 5	Goals	Campos 3	Natatorium of Bao An District; Referees: Stankevitch (USA), Bartels (AUS)

August 18, 2011; 14:30	Report	Great Britain	8–11	United States	Natatorium of Bao An District; Referees: Delon (FRA), Callejas Perez (MEX)
August 18, 2011; 14:30	Report	Score by quarters: 4–2, 0–2, 2–4, 2–3			Natatorium of Bao An District; Referees: Delon (FRA), Callejas Perez (MEX)
August 18, 2011; 14:30	Report	Wilcox 3	Goals	four players 2	Natatorium of Bao An District; Referees: Delon (FRA), Callejas Perez (MEX)

== Semifinal round ==
=== Classification 5–9 places ===
August 19, 2011; 12:00	Report	Australia	11–6	Great Britain	Natatorium of Bao An District; Referees: Brasiliano (ITA), Shi (CHN)
August 19, 2011; 12:00	Report	Score by quarters: 3–2, 3–0, 2–3, 3–1			Natatorium of Bao An District; Referees: Brasiliano (ITA), Shi (CHN)
August 19, 2011; 12:00	Report	Gofers 4	Goals	Gibson Byrne 3	Natatorium of Bao An District; Referees: Brasiliano (ITA), Shi (CHN)

August 19, 2011; 13:30	Report	Canada	12–10	Mexico	Natatorium of Bao An District; Referees: Littlejohn (GBR), Stajkovic (MKD)
August 19, 2011; 13:30	Report	Score by quarters: 4–2, 5–2, 2–2, 1–4			Natatorium of Bao An District; Referees: Littlejohn (GBR), Stajkovic (MKD)
August 19, 2011; 13:30	Report	Morisseau, M.Eggens, C.Eggens 3	Goals	Orozco 3	Natatorium of Bao An District; Referees: Littlejohn (GBR), Stajkovic (MKD)

=== Semifinals ===
August 20, 2011; 14:30	Report	Italy	8–9	United States	Natatorium of Bao An District; Referees: Delon (FRA), Bartels (AUS)
August 20, 2011; 14:30	Report	Score by quarters: 2–2, 0–2, 2–3, 4–2			Natatorium of Bao An District; Referees: Delon (FRA), Bartels (AUS)
August 20, 2011; 14:30	Report	Garibotti 4	Goals	Robertson 3	Natatorium of Bao An District; Referees: Delon (FRA), Bartels (AUS)

August 20, 2011; 16:00	Report	Russia	6–12	China	Natatorium of Bao An District; Referees: Teixido Bermudez (ESP), Shiosaki (JPN)
August 20, 2011; 16:00	Report	Score by quarters: 1–3, 2–2, 2–4, 1–3			Natatorium of Bao An District; Referees: Teixido Bermudez (ESP), Shiosaki (JPN)
August 20, 2011; 16:00	Report	Antonova 3	Goals	Sun, Ma 3	Natatorium of Bao An District; Referees: Teixido Bermudez (ESP), Shiosaki (JPN)

== Final round ==
=== Classification 7–9 places ===
Team	Pld	W	D	L	GF	GA	GD	Pts
Great Britain	2	2	0	0	23	7	+16	4
Mexico	2	1	0	1	12	23	−11	2
France	2	0	0	2	12	17	−5	0

August 20, 2011; 11:30	Report	Great Britain	8–4	France	Natatorium of Bao An District; Referees: Gerzanich (RUS), Hodgers (AUS)
August 20, 2011; 11:30	Report	Score by quarters: 3–2, 2–1, 1–1, 2–0			Natatorium of Bao An District; Referees: Gerzanich (RUS), Hodgers (AUS)
August 20, 2011; 11:30	Report	Snell, Winstanley Smith 2	Goals	Guillet 2	Natatorium of Bao An District; Referees: Gerzanich (RUS), Hodgers (AUS)

August 21, 2011; 10:30	Report	Mexico	9–8	France	Natatorium of Bao An District; Referees: Shi (CHN), Shiosaki (JPN)
August 21, 2011; 10:30	Report	Score by quarters: 2–1, 2–3, 1–1, 4–3			Natatorium of Bao An District; Referees: Shi (CHN), Shiosaki (JPN)
August 21, 2011; 10:30	Report	S. Orozco, Naranjo 3	Goals	Hernandez 3	Natatorium of Bao An District; Referees: Shi (CHN), Shiosaki (JPN)

August 22, 2011; 10:30	Report	Great Britain	15–3	Mexico	Natatorium of Bao An District; Referees: Stankevitch (USA), Hodgers (AUS)
August 22, 2011; 10:30	Report	Score by quarters: 7–2, 3–0, 3–1, 2–0			Natatorium of Bao An District; Referees: Stankevitch (USA), Hodgers (AUS)
August 22, 2011; 10:30	Report	Wilcox 4	Goals	S. Orozco, P. Orozco, Naranjo 1	Natatorium of Bao An District; Referees: Stankevitch (USA), Hodgers (AUS)

=== Final 5–6 places ===
August 20, 2011; 13:00	Report	Australia	11–6	Canada	Natatorium of Bao An District; Referees: Collantoni (ITA), Stankevitch (USA)
August 20, 2011; 13:00	Report	Score by quarters: 3–0, 2–3, 4–2, 2–1			Natatorium of Bao An District; Referees: Collantoni (ITA), Stankevitch (USA)
August 20, 2011; 13:00	Report	Whitehorn 3	Goals	M. Eggens 4	Natatorium of Bao An District; Referees: Collantoni (ITA), Stankevitch (USA)

=== Bronze medal match ===
August 22, 2011; 12:00	Report	Italy	9–18	Russia	Natatorium of Bao An District; Referees: Teixido Bermudez (ESP), Littlejohn (GBR)
August 22, 2011; 12:00	Report	Score by quarters: 2–4, 3–4, 3–4, 1–6			Natatorium of Bao An District; Referees: Teixido Bermudez (ESP), Littlejohn (GBR)
August 22, 2011; 12:00	Report	Garibotti 3	Goals	Belova 4	Natatorium of Bao An District; Referees: Teixido Bermudez (ESP), Littlejohn (GBR)

=== Gold medal match ===
August 22, 2011; 13:30	Report	United States	4–14	China	Natatorium of Bao An District; Referees: Brasiliano (ITA), Delon (FRA)
August 22, 2011; 13:30	Report	Score by quarters: 0–3, 0–6, 2–3, 2–2			Natatorium of Bao An District; Referees: Brasiliano (ITA), Delon (FRA)
August 22, 2011; 13:30	Report	Robertson, Dan 2	Goals	Ma 4	Natatorium of Bao An District; Referees: Brasiliano (ITA), Delon (FRA)

== Final standings ==
Place	Team	Score
1st place, gold medalist(s)	China	6–0–0
2nd place, silver medalist(s)	United States	6–0–1
3rd place, bronze medalist(s)	Russia	5–0–2
4	Italy	3–0–3
5	Australia	3–1–3
6	Canada	1–1–4
7	Great Britain	2–1–4
8	Mexico	2–1–5
9	France	0–0–6
