= 2018 Women's LEN Super Cup =

Water polo match

| Kinef Kirishi | Dunaújváros |
| (Russia) | (Hungary) |
| 11 | 11 |
- Dunaújváros won 15–13 on penalties
- Date: 10 November 2018
- Venue: Neftyanik Sports Complex, Kirishi

The 2018 Women's LEN Super Cup was the 13th edition of the annual trophy organised by LEN and contested by the reigning champions of the two European competitions for women's water polo clubs. The match was played between Kinef Kirishi (2017–18 Euro League champions) and Dunaújvárosi FVE (winners of the 2017–18 LEN Trophy) at the Neftyanik Sports Complex in Kirishi, Russia, on 10 November 2018.

Hungary's Dunaújváros, at their debut in the competition, won the trophy recovering from a 4-goal gap during the last quarter and defeating after the shootouts the European champions and Super Cup title holders of Kinef at their home pool in Kirishi.

== Teams ==
| Team | Qualification | Previous participation (bold indicates winners) |
|---|---|---|
| (Russia) Kinef Kirishi | Winners of the 2017–18 LEN Euro League Women | **2017** |
| (Hungary) Dunaújváros | Winners of the 2017–18 Women's LEN Trophy | Debut |

=== Squads ===
Kinef Kirishi
| **No.** | **Nat.** | **Player** | **Birth Date** | **Position** |
| 1 | (Russia) | Anna Karnaukh | 31 August 1993 | Goalkeeper |
| 2 | (Russia) | Tatiana Zubkova | 7 June 1995 | Field Player |
| 3 | (Russia) | Ekaterina Prokofyeva | 13 March 1991 | Field Player |
| 4 | (Russia) | Anastasia Simanovich | 23 January 1995 | Field Player |
| 5 | (Russia) | Anastasiia Diachenko | 15 March 1999 | Field Player |
| 6 | (Russia) | Kseniia Krimer | 19 July 1992 | Field Player |
| 7 | (Russia) | Bella Khamzaeva | 15 May 1998 | Field Player |
| 8 | (Russia) | Ekaterina Kirilcheva | 17 May 1992 | Field Player |
| 9 | (Russia) | Ekaterina Iakusheva | 26 March 1997 | Field Player |
| 10 | (Russia) | Evgeniia Soboleva (c) | 26 August 1988 | Field Player |
| 11 | (Russia) | Evgeniya Ivanova | 26 July 1987 | Field Player |
| 12 | (Russia) | Daria Ryzhkova | 8 February 1995 | Field Player |
| 13 | (Russia) | Anastasiia Smykova | 17 February 2000 | Goalkeeper |

Head coach: Aleksandr Kabanov

Dunaújváros
| **No.** | **Nat.** | **Player** | **Birth Date** | **Position** |
| 1 | (Hungary) | Alexandra Kiss | 18 August 1996 | Goalkeeper |
| 2 | (Hungary) | Gerda Brezovszki | 8 August 1998 | Field Player |
| 3 | (Hungary) | Kata Menczinger | 17 January 1989 | Field Player |
| 4 | (Hungary) | Gréta Gurisatti | 14 May 1996 | Field Player |
| 5 | (Hungary) | Brigitta Horváth | 14 May 1996 | Field Player |
| 6 | (France) | Géraldine Mahieu | 15 September 1993 | Field Player |
| 7 | (Serbia) | Lara Luka | 25 November 2000 | Field Player |
| 8 | (Hungary) | Krisztina Garda (c) | 16 July 1994 | Field Player |
| 9 | (Hungary) | Diána Ziegler | 4 May 1994 | Field Player |
| 10 | (Hungary) | Vanda Vályi | 13 August 1993 | Field Player |
| 11 | (Hungary) | Vanda Huszti | 12 July 2000 | Field Player |
| 12 | (Hungary) | Csenge Szellák | 23 November 2000 | Field Player |
| 13 | (Netherlands) | Laura Aarts | 10 August 1996 | Goalkeeper |

Head coach: Attila Mihók

== Match ==
| 10 November 2018; 13:00 (UTC+03:00) | Report | (Russia) Kinef Kirishi | 11–11^{(13–15 PSO)} (PSO) | Dunaújváros (Hungary) | Neftyanik Sports Complex, Kirishi; Referees: Margeta (SLO), Colombo (ITA) |
| 10 November 2018; 13:00 (UTC+03:00) | Report | Score by quarters: 2–2, 3–1, 5–4, 1–4 PSO: 2–4 | | | Neftyanik Sports Complex, Kirishi; Referees: Margeta (SLO), Colombo (ITA) |
| 10 November 2018; 13:00 (UTC+03:00) | Report | 2: Zubkova, Prokofyeva, Simanovich, Ryzhkova; 1: Kirilcheva, Soboleva, Ivanova; Penalties: Zubkova; Khamzaeva; Diachenko; Ryzhkova | Goals | 3: Gurisatti; 2: Menczinger, Garda, Vályi; 1: Mahieu, Ziegler; Penalties: Vályi; Garda; Menczinger; Horváth | Neftyanik Sports Complex, Kirishi; Referees: Margeta (SLO), Colombo (ITA) |

== See also ==
- 2018 LEN Super Cup
