= 2025–26 Országos Bajnokság I (women's water polo) =

Hungarian water polo league season

Tournament details
- Country: Hungary
- Teams: 10

Tournament statistics
- Matches played: 90

Official website
- Official website

The 2024–25 Országos Bajnokság I is the 43rd season of the top division women's water polo league in Hungary since its establishment in 1984. It starts in September 2025 with the first round of the regular season and ends in May 2026. The league is organised by the Hungarian Swimming Association.

FTC Telekom are the defending champions.

== Format ==
Each team plays each other twice. The top six teams qualify for the play offs. The quarterfinals and semifinals are played as a best of three series while the final is played as a best of five series.

== Teams ==
Ten clubs compete in the OB I during the 2025–26 season. TVSE are replaced by Uni-Győr Gyvse, who won the second division.

Location of teams in 2025–26 Országos Bajnokság I

OB I
Team	City	Position
BVSC Manna ABC	Budapest (Zugló)	5th
DFVE	Dunaújváros	4th
ONE Eger	Eger	3rd
FTC Telekom	Budapest (Ferencváros)	1st
III Kerületi Torna és Vívó Egylet	Budapest (Óbuda)	6th
KSI SE	Budapest	9th
Valdor Szentes	Szentes	7th
SZVE Goodwill Pharma Fortacell	Szeged	8th
Uni-Győr Gyvse	Győr	1st (OB I/B)
UVSE Helia-D	Budapest (Újpest)	2nd

== Regular season ==
Pos	Team	Pld	W	PSW	PSL	L	GF	GA	GD	Pts	Qualification
1	FTC Telekom	0	0	0	0	0	0	0	0	0	Semifinals
2	UVSE Helia-D	0	0	0	0	0	0	0	0	0	Semifinals
3	ONE Eger	0	0	0	0	0	0	0	0	0	Quarterfinals
4	DFVE	0	0	0	0	0	0	0	0	0	Quarterfinals
5	BVSC Manna ABC	0	0	0	0	0	0	0	0	0	Quarterfinals
6	III Kerületi Torna és Vívó Egylet	0	0	0	0	0	0	0	0	0	Quarterfinals
7	KSI SE	0	0	0	0	0	0	0	0	0	Play Outs
8	Valdor Szentes	0	0	0	0	0	0	0	0	0	Play Outs
9	SZVE Goodwill Pharma Fortacell	0	0	0	0	0	0	0	0	0	Play Outs
10	Uni-Győr Gyvse	0	0	0	0	0	0	0	0	0	Play Outs

Source: Országos Bajnokság I
Rules for classification: 1) Points; 2) Points difference; 3) Points scored.

== Results ==
Home \ Away	BVSC	DFVE	EGER	FTC	KER	KSI	SZE	SZEG	GYO	UVSE
BVSC Manna ABC	—	–	–	–	–	–	–	–	–	–
DFVE	–	—	–	–	–	–	–	–	–	–
ONE Eger	–	–	—	–	–	–	–	–	–	–
FTC Telekom	–	–	–	—	–	–	–	–	–	–
III Kerületi Torna és Vívó Egylet	–	–	–	–	—	–	–	–	–	–
KSI SE	–	–	–	–	–	—	–	–	–	–
Valdor Szentes	–	–	–	–	–	–	—	–	–	–
SZVE Goodwill Pharma Fortacell	–	–	–	–	–	–	–	—	–	–
Uni-Győr Gyvse	–	–	–	–	–	–	–	–	—	–
UVSE Helia-D	–	–	–	–	–	–	–	–	–	—

Updated to match(es) played on unknown. Source: Országos Bajnokság I
Legend: Blue = home team win; Red = away team win.

== Play offs ==
Quarterfinals

Semifinals

Final
Third place

Champions of Hungary

Team
TBD title

== Final standings ==
Pos	Team	Pld	W	L	Qualification or relegation
1	Team	0	0	0	Qualification to Champions League group stage
2	Team	0	0	0	Qualification to Champions League group stage
3	Team	0	0	0	Qualification to Champions League qualification round
4	Team	0	0	0	Qualification to Champions League qualification round
5	Team	0	0	0	Qualification to Euro Cup group stage
6	Team	0	0	0	Qualification to Euro Cup qualification round
7	Team	0	0	0	Qualification to Conference Cup qualification round
8	Team	0	0	0	Qualification to Conference Cup qualification round
9	Team	0	0	0	Advance to Play Outs
10	Team	0	0	0	Advance to Play Outs

Updated to match(es) played on unknown. Source: Országos Bajnokság I
