= 2017–18 LEN Euro League Women =

European water polo tournament

- League: LEN Euro League Women
- Sport: Water Polo
- Duration: 1 December 2017 – 21 April 2018
- Number of games: 60
- Number of teams: 20 (from 8 countries)
- Season champions: (Russia) Kinef Kirishi (2nd title)
- Runners-up: (Spain) CN Sabadell

Euro League Women seasons
- ← 2016–17 2018−19 →

The 2017–18 LEN Euro League Women was the 31st edition of the top tier European tournament for women's water polo clubs. It ran from 1 December 2017 to 21 April 2018.

Defending champions Kinef Kirishi hosted the final 4 on 20 and 21 April 2018 at their home pool. The russian team won the trophy for the second year in a row, defeating in the final game Spain's CN Sabadell.

== Overview ==
=== Calendar ===
The calendar of the competition was released by LEN on 7 June 2017.

| Phase | Round | First leg | Second leg |
|---|---|---|---|
| Group stage | Qualification Round | 1–3 December 2017 | |
| Group stage | Preliminary round | 19–21 January 2018 | |
| Knockout stage | Quarterfinals | 24 February 2018 | 17 March 2018 |
| Knockout stage | Final 4 | 20–21 April 2018 | |

=== Participating teams ===
Qualification round
| (France) Lille UC | (Hungary) BVSC | (Italy) Plebiscito Padova | (Netherlands) ZVL Leiden |
| (Germany) SV Nikar Heidelberg | (Hungary) Dunaújváros | (Italy) WP Messina | (Russia) Dynamo Uralochka |
| (Greece) ANO Glyfada | (Hungary) UVSE | (Netherlands) GZC Donk | (Russia) Ugra Khanty-Mansiysk |
| (Greece) NC Vouliagmeni | (Italy) Orizzonte Catania | (Netherlands) UZSC Utrecht | (Spain) CN Sant Andreu |
Preliminary round
| (Greece) Olympiacos | (Russia) Kinef Kirishi | (Spain) CN Mataró | (Spain) CN Sabadell |

== Qualification round ==
The draw was held by LEN on 19 August 2017.

=== Pools composition ===
| Group A | Group B | Group C | Group D |
|---|---|---|---|
| (Spain) CN Sant Andreu | (Greece) ANO Glyfada | (Russia) Dynamo Uralochka | (Hungary) BVSC |
| (Germany) SV Nikar Heidelberg | (Hungary) Dunaújváros (H) | (Netherlands) GZC Donk | (Italy) Orizzonte Catania |
| (Russia) Ugra Khanty-Mansiysk | (France) Lille UC | (Hungary) UVSE | (Italy) Plebiscito Padova (H) |
| (Italy) WP Messina (H) | (Greece) NC Vouliagmeni | (Netherlands) UZSC Utrecht (H) | (Netherlands) ZVL Leiden |

=== Group A ===
Venue: Piscina Cappuccini, Messina, Italy.

| Pos | Team | Pld | W | D | L | GF | GA | GD | Pts | Qualification |
|---|---|---|---|---|---|---|---|---|---|---|
| 1 | (Russia) Ugra Khanty-Mansiysk | 3 | 3 | 0 | 0 | 33 | 24 | +9 | 9 | Preliminary; Round |
| 2 | (Spain) CN Sant Andreu | 3 | 2 | 0 | 1 | 37 | 27 | +10 | 6 | Preliminary; Round |
| 3 | (Italy) WP Messina | 3 | 1 | 0 | 2 | 34 | 34 | 0 | 3 | Preliminary; Round |
| 4 | (Germany) SV Nikar Heidelberg | 3 | 0 | 0 | 3 | 30 | 49 | −19 | 0 | |

Source: LEN

| Date | Time^{‡} | | Score | | |
| 1 Dec | 18:00 | Messina | 17–11 | Nikar | Report |
| 1 Dec | 20:00 | Sant Andreu | 7–8 | Ugra KM | Report |
| 2 Dec | 18:00 | Messina | 10–13 | Sant Andreu | Report |
| 2 Dec | 20:00 | Ugra KM | 15–10 | Nikar | Report |
| 3 Dec | 09:30 | Sant Andreu | 17–9 | Nikar | Report |
| 3 Dec | 11:00 | Ugra KM | 10–7 | Messina | Report |

=== Group B ===
Venue: Fabó Éva Sportuszoda, Dunaújváros, Hungary.

| Pos | Team | Pld | W | D | L | GF | GA | GD | Pts | Qualification |
|---|---|---|---|---|---|---|---|---|---|---|
| 1 | (Hungary) Dunaújváros | 3 | 3 | 0 | 0 | 44 | 19 | +25 | 9 | Preliminary; Round |
| 2 | (Greece) NC Vouliagmeni | 3 | 2 | 0 | 1 | 51 | 19 | +32 | 6 | Preliminary; Round |
| 3 | (France) Lille UC | 3 | 1 | 0 | 2 | 19 | 39 | −20 | 3 | Preliminary; Round |
| 4 | (Greece) ANO Glyfada | 3 | 0 | 0 | 3 | 14 | 51 | −37 | 0 | |

Source: LEN

| Date | Time^{‡} | | Score | | |
| 1 Dec | 18:45 | Vouliagmeni | 21–3 | Glyfada | Report |
| 1 Dec | 20:15 | Dunaújváros | 12–5 | Lille | Report |
| 2 Dec | 16:30 | Vouliagmeni | 20–2 | Lille | Report |
| 2 Dec | 18:00 | Dunaújváros | 18–4 | Glyfada | Report |
| 3 Dec | 11:00 | Glyfada | 7–12 | Lille | Report |
| 3 Dec | 12:30 | Dunaújváros | 14–10 | Vouliagmeni | Report |

=== Group C ===
Venue: Zwembad De Krommerijn, Utrecht, Netherlands.

| Pos | Team | Pld | W | D | L | GF | GA | GD | Pts | Qualification |
|---|---|---|---|---|---|---|---|---|---|---|
| 1 | (Hungary) UVSE | 6 | 3 | 0 | 3 | 39 | 19 | +20 | 9 | Preliminary; Round |
| 2 | (Russia) Dynamo Uralochka | 4 | 2 | 0 | 2 | 37 | 23 | +14 | 6 | Preliminary; Round |
| 3 | (Netherlands) UZSC Utrecht | 2 | 1 | 0 | 1 | 24 | 30 | −6 | 3 | Preliminary; Round |
| 4 | (Netherlands) GZC Donk | 0 | 0 | 0 | 0 | 16 | 45 | −29 | 0 | |

Source: LEN

| Date | Time^{‡} | | Score | | |
| 1 Dec | 19:00 | Utrecht | 12–4 | Donk | Report |
| 1 Dec | 20:30 | UVSE | 9–8 | Uralochka | Report |
| 2 Dec | 17:30 | UVSE | 16–4 | Donk | Report |
| 2 Dec | 19:00 | Utrecht | 6–12 | Uralochka | Report |
| 3 Dec | 12:30 | Donk | 8–17 | Uralochka | Report |
| 3 Dec | 14:00 | Utrecht | 7–14 | UVSE | Report |

=== Group D ===
Venue: Centro Sportivo del Plebiscito, Padua, Italy.

| Pos | Team | Pld | W | D | L | GF | GA | GD | Pts | Qualification |
|---|---|---|---|---|---|---|---|---|---|---|
| 1 | (Italy) Plebiscito Padova | 3 | 3 | 0 | 0 | 34 | 21 | +13 | 9 | Preliminary; Round |
| 2 | (Italy) Orizzonte Catania | 3 | 2 | 0 | 1 | 40 | 31 | +9 | 6 | Preliminary; Round |
| 3 | (Hungary) BVSC | 3 | 1 | 0 | 2 | 32 | 36 | −4 | 3 | Preliminary; Round |
| 4 | (Netherlands) ZVL Leiden | 3 | 0 | 0 | 3 | 22 | 40 | −18 | 0 | |

Source: LEN

| Date | Time^{‡} | | Score | | |
| 1 Dec | 18:00 | Orizzonte | 17–3 | BVSC | Report |
| 1 Dec | 20:00 | Leiden | 5–14 | Plebiscito | Report |
| 2 Dec | 17:00 | Orizzonte | 16–8 | Leiden | Report |
| 2 Dec | 19:00 | Plebiscito | 10–9 | BVSC | Report |
| 3 Dec | 10:00 | BVSC | 10–9 | Leiden | Report |
| 3 Dec | 12:00 | Plebiscito | 10–7 | Orizzonte | Report |

^{‡} All times are local

== Preliminary round ==
The draw of the pools for the preliminary round was held on 6 December 2017.

=== Pools composition ===
| Group E | Group F | Group G | Group H |
|---|---|---|---|
| (Russia) Dynamo Uralochka | (Spain) CN Mataró | (Hungary) BVSC | (Spain) CN Sabadell |
| (Greece) Olympiacos (H) | (France) Lille UC | (Russia) Kinef Kirishi | (Spain) CN Sant Andreu (H) |
| (Italy) Plebiscito Padova | (Italy) Orizzonte Catania (H) | (Greece) NC Vouliagmeni | (Hungary) Dunaújváros |
| (Italy) WP Messina | (Russia) Ugra Khanty-Mansiysk | (Hungary) UVSE (H) | (Netherlands) UZSC Utrecht |

=== Group E ===
Venue: Petros Kapagerov National Swimming Hall, Piraeus, Greece.

| Pos | Team | Pld | W | D | L | GF | GA | GD | Pts | Qualification |
|---|---|---|---|---|---|---|---|---|---|---|
| 1 | (Greece) Olympiacos | 3 | 3 | 0 | 0 | 45 | 13 | +32 | 9 | Quarterfinals |
| 2 | (Italy) Plebiscito Padova | 3 | 2 | 0 | 1 | 35 | 17 | +18 | 6 | Quarterfinals |
| 3 | (Russia) Dynamo Uralochka | 3 | 1 | 0 | 2 | 39 | 32 | +7 | 3 | |
| 4 | (Italy) WP Messina | 3 | 0 | 0 | 3 | 10 | 57 | −47 | 0 | |

Source: LEN

| Date | Time^{‡} | | Score | | |
| 19 Jan | 18:30 | Olympiacos | 10–7 | Plebiscito | Report |
| 19 Jan | 20:15 | Uralochka | 21–5 | Messina | Report |
| 20 Jan | 18:00 | Olympiacos | 18–13 | Uralochka | Report |
| 20 Jan | 19:45 | Messina | 2–19 | Plebiscito | Report |
| 21 Jan | 12:15 | Olympiacos | 17–3 | Messina | Report |
| 21 Jan | 12:30 | Plebiscito | 9–5 | Uralochka | Report |

=== Group F ===
Venue: Piscina Francesco Scuderi, Catania, Italy.

| Pos | Team | Pld | W | D | L | GF | GA | GD | Pts | Qualification |
|---|---|---|---|---|---|---|---|---|---|---|
| 1 | (Italy) Orizzonte Catania | 3 | 3 | 0 | 0 | 40 | 21 | +19 | 9 | Quarterfinals |
| 2 | (Spain) CN Mataró | 3 | 2 | 0 | 1 | 24 | 24 | 0 | 6 | Quarterfinals |
| 3 | (Russia) Ugra Khanty-Mansiysk | 3 | 1 | 0 | 2 | 28 | 34 | −6 | 3 | |
| 4 | (France) Lille UC | 3 | 0 | 0 | 3 | 20 | 38 | −18 | 0 | |

Source: LEN

| Date | Time^{‡} | | Score | | |
| 19 Jan | 18:30 | Orizzonte | 15–4 | Lille | Report |
| 19 Jan | 20:30 | Mataró | 10–7 | Ugra KM | Report |
| 20 Jan | 17:00 | Mataró | 3–8 | Orizzonte | Report |
| 20 Jan | 19:00 | Ugra KM | 12–7 | Lille | Report |
| 21 Jan | 10:00 | Lille | 9–11 | Mataró | Report |
| 21 Jan | 12:00 | Orizzonte | 17–9 | Ugra KM | Report |

=== Group G ===
Venue: Alfréd Hajós National Swimming Stadium, Budapest, Hungary.

| Pos | Team | Pld | W | D | L | GF | GA | GD | Pts | Qualification |
|---|---|---|---|---|---|---|---|---|---|---|
| 1 | (Hungary) UVSE | 3 | 3 | 0 | 0 | 33 | 21 | +12 | 9 | Quarterfinals |
| 2 | (Russia) Kinef Kirishi | 3 | 2 | 0 | 1 | 32 | 28 | +4 | 6 | Quarterfinals |
| 3 | (Greece) NC Vouliagmeni | 3 | 1 | 0 | 2 | 28 | 31 | −3 | 3 | |
| 4 | (Hungary) BVSC | 3 | 0 | 0 | 3 | 24 | 37 | −13 | 0 | |

Source: LEN

| Date | Time^{‡} | | Score | | |
| 19 Jan | 18:00 | UVSE | 12–8 | Vouliagmeni | Report |
| 19 Jan | 19:45 | Kinef | 16–8 | BVSC | Report |
| 20 Jan | 18:15 | UVSE | 11–5 | Kinef | Report |
| 20 Jan | 19:45 | Vouliagmeni | 11–8 | BVSC | Report |
| 21 Jan | 11:00 | Vouliagmeni | 9–11 | Kinef | Report |
| 21 Jan | 12:45 | UVSE | 10–8 | BVSC | Report |

=== Group H ===
Venue: Piscina Sant Jordi, Barcelona, Spain.

| Pos | Team | Pld | W | D | L | GF | GA | GD | Pts | Qualification |
|---|---|---|---|---|---|---|---|---|---|---|
| 1 | (Spain) CN Sabadell | 3 | 3 | 0 | 0 | 41 | 22 | +19 | 9 | Quarterfinals |
| 2 | (Hungary) Dunaújváros | 3 | 2 | 0 | 1 | 40 | 29 | +11 | 6 | Quarterfinals |
| 3 | (Spain) CN Sant Andreu | 3 | 1 | 0 | 2 | 28 | 33 | −5 | 3 | |
| 4 | (Netherlands) UZSC Utrecht | 3 | 0 | 0 | 3 | 20 | 45 | −25 | 0 | |

Source: LEN

| Date | Time^{‡} | | Score | | |
| 19 Jan | 18:30 | Sabadell | 13–8 | Dunaújváros | Report |
| 19 Jan | 20:30 | Sant Andreu | 13–5 | Utrecht | Report |
| 20 Jan | 18:30 | Sabadell | 15–7 | Utrecht | Report |
| 20 Jan | 20:30 | Sant Andreu | 8–15 | Dunaújváros | Report |
| 21 Jan | 11:30 | Dunaújváros | 17–8 | Utrecht | Report |
| 21 Jan | 13:30 | Sant Andreu | 7–13 | Sabadell | Report |

^{‡} All times are local

== Knockout stage ==
=== Quarterfinals ===
The draw of the Quarterfinals matches was held, alongside the draw for the 2019 Women's European U19 Championship, on 27 January 2018.

| Team 1 | Agg. | Team 2 | 1st leg | 2nd leg |
|---|---|---|---|---|
| UVSE (Hungary) | 15–13 | (Italy) Plebiscito Padova | 7–7 | 8–6 |
| CN Sabadell (Spain) | 23–9 | (Spain) CN Mataró | 12–3 | 11–6 |
| Dunaújváros (Hungary) | 28–29 | (Italy) Orizzonte Catania | 10–13 | 18–16 |
| Kinef Kirishi (Russia) | 21–20 | (Greece) Olympiacos | 10–10 | 11–10 |

==== First leg ====
| 24 Feb 2018; 13:15 (UTC+1) | Report | CN Sabadell (Spain) | 12–3 | (Spain) CN Mataró | Centre Can Llong (Sabadell); Referees: Navarra (ITA), Marjay (HUN) |
| 24 Feb 2018; 13:15 (UTC+1) | Report | Score by quarters: 3–2, 5–0, 1–0, 3–1 | | | Centre Can Llong (Sabadell); Referees: Navarra (ITA), Marjay (HUN) |
| 24 Feb 2018; 13:15 (UTC+1) | Report | 4: Ortiz, García; 1: four players | Goals | 2: Bach; 1: Lloret | Centre Can Llong (Sabadell); Referees: Navarra (ITA), Marjay (HUN) |

| 24 Feb 2018; 14:00 (UTC+3) | Report | Kinef Kirishi (Russia) | 10–10 | (Greece) Olympiacos | Neftyanik Sport Complex (Kirishi); Referees: Kuníková (SVK), Radičević (CRO) |
| 24 Feb 2018; 14:00 (UTC+3) | Report | Score by quarters: 2–0, 2–4, 3–5, 3–1 | | | Neftyanik Sport Complex (Kirishi); Referees: Kuníková (SVK), Radičević (CRO) |
| 24 Feb 2018; 14:00 (UTC+3) | Report | 3: Diatchenko; 2: Prokofyeva, Ryzhkova | Goals | 5: Asimaki; 2: Eggens | Neftyanik Sport Complex (Kirishi); Referees: Kuníková (SVK), Radičević (CRO) |

| 24 Feb 2018; 17:00 (UTC+1) | Report | Dunaújváros (Hungary) | 10–13 | (Italy) Orizzonte Catania | Fabó Éva Sportuszoda (Dunaújváros); Referees: Mauss (GER), Dreval (RUS) |
| 24 Feb 2018; 17:00 (UTC+1) | Report | Score by quarters: 2–3, 6–2, 1–4, 1–4 | | | Fabó Éva Sportuszoda (Dunaújváros); Referees: Mauss (GER), Dreval (RUS) |
| 24 Feb 2018; 17:00 (UTC+1) | Report | 4: Szilágyi; 3: Gurisatti | Goals | 4: Bianconi; 3: Aiello | Fabó Éva Sportuszoda (Dunaújváros); Referees: Mauss (GER), Dreval (RUS) |

| 24 Feb 2018; 19:00 (UTC+1) | Report | UVSE (Hungary) | 7–7 | (Italy) Plebiscito Padova | Alfréd Hajós National Swimming Stadium (Budapest); Referees: Markopoulou (GRE), Teixido (ESP) |
| 24 Feb 2018; 19:00 (UTC+1) | Report | Score by quarters: 1–1, 3–2, 2–2, 1–2 | | | Alfréd Hajós National Swimming Stadium (Budapest); Referees: Markopoulou (GRE), Teixido (ESP) |
| 24 Feb 2018; 19:00 (UTC+1) | Report | 2: Keszthelyi, Steffens; 1: three players | Goals | 4: Millo; 2: Barzon | Alfréd Hajós National Swimming Stadium (Budapest); Referees: Markopoulou (GRE), Teixido (ESP) |

==== Second leg ====
| 17 Mar 2018; 12:45 (UTC+1) | Report | CN Mataró (Spain) | 6–11 | (Spain) CN Sabadell | Complex Esportiu Joan Serra (Mataró); Referees: Fester (GER), Dervieux (FRA) |
| 17 Mar 2018; 12:45 (UTC+1) | Report | Score by quarters: 1–4, 0–3, 2–1, 3–3 | | | Complex Esportiu Joan Serra (Mataró); Referees: Fester (GER), Dervieux (FRA) |
| 17 Mar 2018; 12:45 (UTC+1) | Report | 2: Vicente; 1: four players | Goals | 5: Neushul; 2: Espar | Complex Esportiu Joan Serra (Mataró); Referees: Fester (GER), Dervieux (FRA) |

| 17 Mar 2018; 18:00 (UTC+1) | Report | Orizzonte Catania (Italy) | 10–13^{16–18 (PSO)} | (Hungary) Dunaújváros | Piscina Francesco Scuderi (Catania); Referees: Balanescu (ROU), Teixido (ESP) |
| 17 Mar 2018; 18:00 (UTC+1) | Report | Score by quarters: 2–3, 3–3, 1–5, 4–2 PSO: 6–5 | | | Piscina Francesco Scuderi (Catania); Referees: Balanescu (ROU), Teixido (ESP) |
| 17 Mar 2018; 18:00 (UTC+1) | Report | 4: Bianconi; 3: van der Sloot | Goals | 3: Szilágyi, Vályi; 2: Gurisatti, Hórvath, Garda | Piscina Francesco Scuderi (Catania); Referees: Balanescu (ROU), Teixido (ESP) |

| 17 Mar 2018; 19:00 (UTC+1) | Report | Plebiscito Padova (Italy) | 6–8 | (Hungary) UVSE | Centro Sportivo del Plebiscito (Padua); Referees: Dreval (RUS), Franulović (CRO) |
| 17 Mar 2018; 19:00 (UTC+1) | Report | Score by quarters: 2–4, 0–2, 2–1, 2–1 | | | Centro Sportivo del Plebiscito (Padua); Referees: Dreval (RUS), Franulović (CRO) |
| 17 Mar 2018; 19:00 (UTC+1) | Report | 3: Barzon; 1: three players | Goals | 2: Parkes, Keszthelyi, Steffens | Centro Sportivo del Plebiscito (Padua); Referees: Dreval (RUS), Franulović (CRO) |

| 17 Mar 2018; 19:15 (UTC+2) | Report | Olympiacos (Greece) | 10–11 | (Russia) Kinef Kirishi | Petros Kapagerov National Swimming Hall (Piraeus); Referees: Várkonyi (HUN), Buch (ESP) |
| 17 Mar 2018; 19:15 (UTC+2) | Report | Score by quarters: 2–2, 3–3, 2–2, 3–4 | | | Petros Kapagerov National Swimming Hall (Piraeus); Referees: Várkonyi (HUN), Buch (ESP) |
| 17 Mar 2018; 19:15 (UTC+2) | Report | 4: Eggens; 2: Emmolo | Goals | 3: Prokofyeva; 2: three players | Petros Kapagerov National Swimming Hall (Piraeus); Referees: Várkonyi (HUN), Buch (ESP) |

=== Final Four ===
LEN announced the choice of the defending champions Kinef Kirishi as host of the final Four on 20 March 2018. The draw was held in Pontevedra, Spain, during the last day of Europa Cup Super Final.

==== Semifinals ====
| 20 Apr 2018; 17:30 (UTC+3) | Report | CN Sabadell (Spain) | 17–8 | (Hungary) UVSE | Neftyanik Sport Complex (Kirishi); Referees: Mišković (MNE), Matache (ROU) |
| 20 Apr 2018; 17:30 (UTC+3) | Report | Score by quarters: 4–4, 5–2, 3–1, 5–1 | | | Neftyanik Sport Complex (Kirishi); Referees: Mišković (MNE), Matache (ROU) |
| 20 Apr 2018; 17:30 (UTC+3) | Report | 5: Ortiz, Forca; 2: Farre | Goals | 4: Steffens; 2: Keszthelyi | Neftyanik Sport Complex (Kirishi); Referees: Mišković (MNE), Matache (ROU) |

| 20 Apr 2018; 19:00 (UTC+3) | Report | Orizzonte Catania (Italy) | 13–14 | (Russia) Kinef Kirishi | Neftyanik Sport Complex (Kirishi); Referees: Markopoulou (GRE), Uhlig (GER) |
| 20 Apr 2018; 19:00 (UTC+3) | Report | Score by quarters: 3–3, 3–4, 3–5, 4–2 | | | Neftyanik Sport Complex (Kirishi); Referees: Markopoulou (GRE), Uhlig (GER) |
| 20 Apr 2018; 19:00 (UTC+3) | Report | 6: van der Sloot; 3: Bianconi | Goals | 5: Krimer; 4: Ryzhkova | Neftyanik Sport Complex (Kirishi); Referees: Markopoulou (GRE), Uhlig (GER) |

==== Finals ====
3rd place

| 21 Apr 2018; 12:30 (UTC+3) | Report | UVSE (Hungary) | 6–6^{10–11 (PSO)} | (Italy) Orizzonte Catania | Neftyanik Sport Complex (Kirishi); Referees: Uhlig (GER), Mišković (MNE) |
| 21 Apr 2018; 12:30 (UTC+3) | Report | Score by quarters: 0–3, 3–0, 1–2, 2–1 PSO: 4–5 | | | Neftyanik Sport Complex (Kirishi); Referees: Uhlig (GER), Mišković (MNE) |
| 21 Apr 2018; 12:30 (UTC+3) | Report | 2: Sevenich | Goals | 2: Garibotti | Neftyanik Sport Complex (Kirishi); Referees: Uhlig (GER), Mišković (MNE) |

1st place

| 21 Apr 2018; 14:00 (UTC+3) | Report | CN Sabadell (Spain) | 8–8^{12–13 (PSO)} | (Russia) Kinef Kirishi | Neftyanik Sport Complex (Kirishi); Referees: Markopoulou (GRE), Matache (ROU) |
| 21 Apr 2018; 14:00 (UTC+3) | Report | Score by quarters: 3–3, 0–2, 2–1, 3–2 PSO: 4–5 | | | Neftyanik Sport Complex (Kirishi); Referees: Markopoulou (GRE), Matache (ROU) |
| 21 Apr 2018; 14:00 (UTC+3) | Report | 3: Neushul; 2: Domenech | Goals | 3: Ryzhkova; 2: Krimer | Neftyanik Sport Complex (Kirishi); Referees: Markopoulou (GRE), Matache (ROU) |

2017–18 LEN Euro League Women
Champions

Kinef Kirishi
2nd title

Final standings

| | Team |
|---|---|
| Gold medal | (Russia) Kinef Kirishi |
| Silver medal | (Spain) CN Sabadell |
| Bronze medal | (Italy) Orizzonte Catania |
| 4 | (Hungary) UVSE |

== See also ==
- 2017–18 LEN Champions League
- 2017–18 Women's LEN Trophy
