= 2017–18 Országos Bajnokság I (women's water polo) =

Water polo season

Női OB I
- Season: 2017–18

The 2017–18 Országos Bajnokság I was the 35th season of the Országos Bajnokság I, Hungary's premier Water polo league.

== Team information ==
Location of teams in 2017-18 Országos Bajnokság I

The following 10 clubs compete in the OB I during the 2017–18 season:

OB I
| Team | City | Pool | Founded | Colours |
| BVSC | Budapest (XIV. ker) | Szőnyi úti uszoda | 1911 | |
| Dunaújvárosi Egyetem | Dunaújváros | Fabó Éva Sportuszoda | 1989 | |
| Eger | Eger | Bitskey Aladár uszoda | 1910 | |
| FTC | Budapest (IX. ker) | Népligeti uszoda | 1899 | |
| Honvéd | Budapest (XIX. ker) | Kőér utcai uszoda | 1950 | |
| Szeged | Szeged | Ligetfürdő | 1993 | |
| Szentes | Szentes | Dr. Rébeli Szabó József Sportuszoda | 1934 | |
| Tatabánya | Tatabánya | Tatabányai Sportuszoda | 1992 | |
| UVSE | Budapest (IV. ker) | Hajós Alfréd Sportuszoda | 2008 | |
| UVSE Margitsziget | Budapest | Hajós Alfréd Sportuszoda | | |

== Regular season ==
| Pos | Team | Pld | W | D | L | GF | GA | GD | Pts | Qualification |
|---|---|---|---|---|---|---|---|---|---|---|
| 1 | UVSE | 18 | 18 | 0 | 0 | 283 | 90 | +193 | 54 | Qualification to Championship playoff |
| 2 | Dunaújvárosi Egyetem - Maarsk Graphics | 18 | 15 | 1 | 2 | 277 | 121 | +156 | 46 | Qualification to Championship playoff |
| 3 | BVSC-Zugló Diapolo | 18 | 14 | 1 | 3 | 231 | 109 | +122 | 43 | Qualification to Championship playoff |
| 4 | Ferencvárosi TC | 18 | 12 | 0 | 6 | 243 | 134 | +109 | 36 | Qualification to Championship playoff |
| 5 | ZF-Eger | 18 | 10 | 0 | 8 | 174 | 191 | −17 | 30 | Qualification to Championship playoff |
| 6 | Hungerit Szentes | 18 | 8 | 0 | 10 | 172 | 147 | +25 | 24 | Qualification to Championship playoff |
| 7 | Szegedi Tudományegyetem T&N | 18 | 6 | 0 | 12 | 152 | 188 | −36 | 18 | Qualification to Relegation playout |
| 8 | UVSE Margitsziget | 18 | 3 | 0 | 15 | 119 | 266 | −147 | 9 (Note: UVSE - TVSE: 9–6; TVSE - UVSE: 5–4) | Qualification to Relegation playout |
| 9 | Tatabányai VSE | 18 | 3 | 0 | 15 | 91 | 255 | −164 | 9 | Qualification to Relegation playout |
| 10 | RacioNet Honvéd | 18 | 0 | 0 | 18 | 80 | 321 | −241 | 0 | Qualification to Relegation playout |

=== Schedule and results ===
In the table below the home teams are listed on the left and the away teams along the top.

| Home \ Away | BHSE | BVSC | DUE | EGER | FTC | SZEG | SZEN | UVSE | UVSEM | TVSE |
|---|---|---|---|---|---|---|---|---|---|---|
| Bp. Honvéd SE | | 3–24 | 3–26 | 4–11 | 4–23 | 4–11 | 6–21 | 4–18 | 6–13 | 7–9 |
| BVSC-Zugló | 25–7 | | 9–11 | 16–6 | 11–6 | 12–8 | 12–7 | 7–11 | 16–3 | 20–5 |
| Dunaújvárosi UE | 27–1 | 7–7 | | 21–8 | 8–6 | 19–5 | 10–7 | 6–8 | 14–5 | 22–4 |
| Egri VK | 10–1 | 4–8 | 9–17 | | 11–17 | 12–9 | 5–4 | 5–24 | 16–3 | 17–10 |
| Ferencvárosi TC | 31–4 | 6–8 | 11–12 | 13–7 | | 13–6 | 8–6 | 5–10 | 17–5 | 18–5 |
| Szegedi NVE | 18–6 | 7–9 | 7–17 | 8–10 | 4–11 | | 6–7 | 4–10 | 18–11 | 10–5 |
| Szentesi VK | 17–6 | 6–14 | 8–11 | 9–10 | 5–9 | 11–3 | | 5–6 | 14–10 | 13–8 |
| UVSE | 19–4 | 8–4 | 14–11 | 18–6 | 13–7 | 18–3 | 14–6 | | 22–4 | 24–1 |
| UVSE Margitsziget II. | 13–7 | 2–15 | 4–18 | 6–17 | 9–21 | 8–14 | 5–15 | 5–25 | | 9–6 |
| Tatabányai VSE | 5–3 | 2–14 | 5–20 | 3–10 | 6–21 | 5–11 | 4–11 | 3–21 | 5–4 | |

Legend: Blue = home team win; Yellow = draw; Red = away team win.

== Championship playoff ==
=== Quarterfinals ===
| Team 1 | Points | Team 2 | Games in the season | | Game 1 | Game 2 | Game 3 |
|---|---|---|---|---|---|---|---|
| BVSC-Zugló Diapolo (3) | 9–0 | Hungerit Szentes (6) | 12-7 | 14-6 | 13-9 | — | — |
| Ferencvárosi TC (4) | 9–0 | ZF-Eger (5) | 13-7 | 17-11 | 14-9 | — | — |

Game 1

| 7 March 2018; 20:15 (CET) | Report | BVSC-Zugló Diapolo | 13–9 | Hungerit Szentes | Szőnyi úti uszoda, Budapest; Referees: Kovács Cs., Birri |
| 7 March 2018; 20:15 (CET) | Report | Score by quarters: 4-3, 2-1, 4-3, 3-2 | | | Szőnyi úti uszoda, Budapest; Referees: Kovács Cs., Birri |
| 7 March 2018; 20:15 (CET) | Report | Leimeter 4 | Goals | Hevesi, Niu, Palaro 2 | Szőnyi úti uszoda, Budapest; Referees: Kovács Cs., Birri |

BVSC-Zugló Diapolo won the series 9–0 with points ratio, and advanced to the Semifinals.

| 7 March 2018; 18:45 (CET) | Report | Ferencvárosi TC | 14–9 | ZF-Eger | Népligeti uszoda, Budapest; Referees: Bereczki, Tordai |
| 7 March 2018; 18:45 (CET) | Report | Score by quarters: 4-3, 2-0, 5-4, 3-2 | | | Népligeti uszoda, Budapest; Referees: Bereczki, Tordai |
| 7 March 2018; 18:45 (CET) | Report | Bujka 6 | Goals | Somhegyi, Ráski, Games 2 | Népligeti uszoda, Budapest; Referees: Bereczki, Tordai |

Ferencvárosi TC won the series 9–0 with points ratio, and advanced to the Semifinals.

=== Semifinals ===
Higher ranked team hosted Game 1 plus Game 3 if necessary. The lower ranked hosted Game 2.

| Team 1 | Agg. | Team 2 | Game 1 | Game 2 | Game 3 |
|---|---|---|---|---|---|
| UVSE | – | Ferencvárosi TC | - | - | — |
| DUE-Maarsk Graphics | – | BVSC-Zugló Diapolo | - | - | — |

Game 1

| 4 April 2018; 18:45 (CEST) | Report | UVSE | – | Ferencvárosi TC | Hajós Alfréd Sportuszoda, Budapest |
| 4 April 2018; 18:45 (CEST) | Report | Score by quarters: -, -, -, - | | | Hajós Alfréd Sportuszoda, Budapest |

| 4 April 2018; 19:00 (CEST) | Report | DUE-Maarsk Graphics | – | BVSC-Zugló Diapolo | Fabó Éva Sportuszoda, Dunaújváros |
| 4 April 2018; 19:00 (CEST) | Report | Score by quarters: -, -, -, - | | | Fabó Éva Sportuszoda, Dunaújváros |

== See also ==
- 2017 Magyar Kupa (National Cup of Hungary)
