= Magyar Kupa (women's water polo) =

Annual Hungarian water polo tournament

- Founded: 1999-00
- Region: Hungary
- Teams: 8 (2016-17)
- Current champions: UVSE (5th title) [NEED UPDATE]
- Most championships: Dunaújváros (6 titles)
- Website: waterpolo.hu
- 2021

The Hungarian Cup (Hungarian: Magyar Kupa) is the Hungarian cup competition for water polo. It has been incepted by the Hungarian Water Polo Federation, the Magyar Vízilabda Szövetség in 1999.

Most successful participant in the Magya Kupa has been the Dunaújváros with 19 wins. The current holders are UVSE.

== Winners ==
Previous cup winners are:

- 1999/00: Szentes
- 2000/01: Dunaújváros
- 2001/02: Dunaújváros
- 2002/03: Dunaújváros
- 2003/04: Dunaújváros
- 2004/05: Bp. Honvéd
- 2006: Bp. Honvéd
- 2007: OSC
- 2008: Bp. Honvéd
- 2009: Dunaújváros
- 2010: Szentes
- 2011: BVSC
- 2012: Eger
- 2013: Dunaújváros
- 2014: UVSE
- 2015: UVSE
- 2016: UVSE
- 2017: UVSE
- 2018: UVSE
- 2019:
- 2020:
- 2021:

=== Finals ===
The following table contains all the finals from the sixty years long history of the Magyar Kupa. In some occasions, there was not held a final match but a final tournament. In these cases, the team with the most total points have been crowned as cup winners.

Key
(R)	Replay
aet	Match went to extra time
p	Match decided by a penalty shootout after extra time
‡	Winning team won the Double

Finals of Hungarian Cup
No.	Season	Winners	Score	Runners-up	Hall	Date of final(s)
1st	1999–00	Szentes	17–14; 9–6 / 8–8	Dunaújváros	Municipal Swimming Pool, Szentes; Fabó Éva Swimming Pool, Dunaújváros	20 May 2000; 21 May 2000
2nd	2000–01	Dunaújváros	9−6	Vasas	Bitskey Aladár Swimming Pool, Eger	18 March 2001
3rd	2001–02	Dunaújváros	9−6	BVSC	Császár-Komjádi Swimming Stadium, Budapest	8 March 2002
4th	2002–03	Dunaújváros	12−9	BVSC	Csitáry G. Emil Swimming Pool, Székesfehérvár	9 March 2003
5th	2003–04	Dunaújváros	16−5	Vasas	Municipal Swimming Pool, Hódmezővásárhely	7 February 2004
6th	2004–05	Bp. Honvéd	7−6	Dunaújváros	Municipal Swimming Pool, Kazincbarcika	2 February 2005
No Competitions Held
7th	2006	Bp. Honvéd	19−10	OSC	Debrecen Swimming Pool Complex, Debrecen	16 October 2006
8th	2007	OSC	8−6	Bp. Honvéd	Szőnyi str., Budapest	30 December 2007
9th	2008	Bp. Honvéd	9−7	Dunaújváros	Bitskey Aladár Swimming Pool, Eger	30 November 2008
10th	2009	Dunaújváros	11−8	BVSC	Szőnyi str., Budapest	22 November 2009
11th	2010	Szentes	6−5	Szeged	Szőnyi str., Budapest	30 November 2010
12th	2011	BVSC	9−8	Szentes	Szőnyi str., Budapest	13 November 2011
13th	2012	Eger	9−5	Szentes	Császár-Komjádi Swimming Stadium, Budapest	11 November 2012
14th	2013	Dunaújváros	10−9	Eger	Water Polo Arena (Tiszaliget), Szolnok	17 November 2013
15th	2014	UVSE	6−5	Dunaújváros	Municipal Swimming Pool, Szentes	7 December 2014
16th	2015	UVSE	6−5	BVSC	Alfréd Hajós National Swimming Stadium, Budapest	29 November 2015
17th	2016	UVSE	9−5	BVSC	Fabó Éva Swimming Pool, Dunaújváros	20 November 2016
18th	2017	UVSE	10−10 (4-2 p)	Dunaújváros	Császár-Komjádi Swimming Stadium, Budapest	10 December 2017

== Performances ==
=== By club ===
The performance of various clubs is shown in the following table:

Club	Titles	Runners-up	Winning years
Dunaújváros (Note: Includes Dunaújvárosi VSE, Dunaújvárosi Főiskola and Dunaújvárosi Egyetem-Maarsk Graphics.)	**6**	5	2000–01, 2001–02, 2002–03, 2003–04, 2009, 2013
UVSE	**5**	0	2014, 2015, 2016, 2017, 2018
Bp. Honvéd (Note: Includes Domino-Bp. Honvéd-Póló SC.)	**3**	1	2004–05, 2006, 2008
Szentes (Note: Includes Hungerit-Carnex- Hungerit-MetalCom- Hungerit-Uni-Épszer-Szentesi VK.)	**2**	2	1999–00, 2010
OSC (Note: Includes Újpest-OSC-Cemelog and OSC-Cemelog.)	**1**	1	2007
BVSC	**1**	5	2011
Eger (Note: Includes ZF-Eger.)	**1**	1	2012
Vasas	–	2	-
Szeged	–	1	-

=== By county ===
County	Titles	Winning clubs
Budapest	10	**UVSE** (5), **Honvéd** (3), OSC (1), **BVSC** (1),
Fejér	6	**Dunaújváros** (6)
Csongrád	2	**Szentes** (2)
Heves	1	**Eger** (1)

- The bolded teams are currently playing in the 2018-19 season of the Hungarian League.

== See also ==
- Országos Bajnokság I (National Championship of Hungary)
