= Water polo at the 2016 Summer Olympics – Women's team rosters =

These are the rosters of all participating teams at the women's water polo tournament at the 2016 Summer Olympics in Rio de Janeiro.

Abbreviations
Pos.	Position	№	Cap number
CF	Centre Forward	CB	Centre Back
D	Defense	GK	Goalkeeper

== Pool A ==
=== Australia ===
The following is the Australian roster in the women's water polo tournament of the 2016 Summer Olympics.

Head coach: Greg McFadden

№	Name	Pos.	Height	Weight	Date of birth	2016 club
1	Lea Yanitsas	GK	1.72 m (5 ft 8 in)	78 kg (172 lb)	15 March 1989	(Australia) Sydney Uni Water Polo Club
2	Gemma Beadsworth	CF	1.80 m (5 ft 11 in)	78 kg (172 lb)	17 July 1987	(Australia) Fremantle Marlins
3	Hannah Buckling	CB	1.77 m (5 ft 10 in)	75 kg (165 lb)	3 June 1992	(Australia) Sydney Uni Water Polo Club
4	Holly Lincoln-Smith	CF	1.83 m (6 ft 0 in)	82 kg (181 lb)	26 March 1988	(Australia) Cronulla Sharks
5	Keesja Gofers	D	1.76 m (5 ft 9 in)	64 kg (141 lb)	16 March 1990	(Australia) Sydney Uni Water Polo Club
6	Bronwen Knox (c)	CF	1.82 m (6 ft 0 in)	88 kg (194 lb)	16 April 1986	(Australia) Victorian Tigers
7	Rowena Webster	CB	1.78 m (5 ft 10 in)	64 kg (141 lb)	27 December 1987	(Australia) Victorian Tigers
8	Glencora Ralph	CB	1.78 m (5 ft 10 in)	68 kg (150 lb)	8 August 1988	(Australia) Fremantle Marlins
9	Zoe Arancini	D	1.70 m (5 ft 7 in)	70 kg (154 lb)	14 July 1991	(Australia) Fremantle Marlins
10	Ashleigh Southern	CF	1.88 m (6 ft 2 in)	82 kg (181 lb)	22 October 1992	(Australia) Brisbane Barracudas
11	Isobel Bishop	D	1.80 m (5 ft 11 in)	69 kg (152 lb)	8 September 1991	(Australia) Sydney Uni Water Polo Club
12	Nicola Zagame	D	1.74 m (5 ft 9 in)	72 kg (159 lb)	11 August 1990	(Australia) Cronulla Sharks
13	Kelsey Wakefield	GK	1.78 m (5 ft 10 in)	64 kg (141 lb)	1 June 1991	(Australia) Queensland Breakers

=== Brazil ===
The following is the Brazilian roster in the women's water polo tournament of the 2016 Summer Olympics.

Head coach: (Canada) Patrick Oaten

№	Name	Pos.	Height	Weight	Date of birth	2016 club
1	Tess Oliveira	GK	1.71 m (5 ft 7 in)	66 kg (146 lb)	6 January 1987	(Brazil) Pinheiros
2	Diana Abla	CF	1.75 m (5 ft 9 in)	70 kg (154 lb)	29 July 1995	(Brazil) Pinheiros
3	Marina Zablith (c)	CB	1.82 m (6 ft 0 in)	77 kg (170 lb)	4 March 1987	(Brazil) Pinheiros
4	Marina Canetti	CF	1.70 m (5 ft 7 in)	66 kg (146 lb)	24 January 1983	(Brazil) Flamengo
5	Lucianne Barroncas	D	1.74 m (5 ft 9 in)	68 kg (150 lb)	1 April 1988	(Brazil) Pinheiros
6	Izabella Chiappini	D	1.71 m (5 ft 7 in)	67 kg (148 lb)	28 September 1995	(Brazil) Pinheiros
7	Amanda Oliveira	D	1.71 m (5 ft 7 in)	66 kg (146 lb)	6 January 1987	(Brazil) Pinheiros
8	Luíza Carvalho	CF	1.83 m (6 ft 0 in)	77 kg (170 lb)	2 July 1983	(Brazil) Pinheiros
9	Camila Pedrosa	CF	1.72 m (5 ft 8 in)	60 kg (132 lb)	12 March 1975	(Brazil) Paulistano
10	Viviane Bahia	CB	1.76 m (5 ft 9 in)	68 kg (150 lb)	14 February 1994	(Brazil) Pinheiros
11	Mariana Duarte	W	1.65 m (5 ft 5 in)	66 kg (146 lb)	5 October 1986	(Brazil) Paineiras do Morumby
12	Gabriela Mantellato	D	1.75 m (5 ft 9 in)	72 kg (159 lb)	28 October 1991	(Brazil) Pinheiros
13	Victória Chamorro	GK	1.75 m (5 ft 9 in)	70 kg (154 lb)	10 July 1996	(Brazil) Paineiras do Morumby

=== Italy ===
The following is the Italian roster in the women's water polo tournament of the 2016 Summer Olympics.

Head coach: Fabio Conti

№	Name	Pos.	Height	Weight	Date of birth	2016 club
1	Giulia Gorlero	GK	1.80 m (5 ft 11 in)	73 kg (161 lb)	26 September 1990	(Italy) Despar Messina
2	Chiara Tabani	CB	1.76 m (5 ft 9 in)	72 kg (159 lb)	27 August 1994	(Italy) Mediostar Prato
3	Arianna Garibotti	D	1.69 m (5 ft 7 in)	64 kg (141 lb)	9 December 1989	(Italy) Despar Messina
4	Elisa Queirolo	CB	1.68 m (5 ft 6 in)	61 kg (134 lb)	6 March 1991	(Italy) Plebiscito Padova
5	Federica Radicchi	CB	1.70 m (5 ft 7 in)	70 kg (154 lb)	21 December 1988	(Italy) Despar Messina
6	Rosaria Aiello	CF	1.72 m (5 ft 8 in)	74 kg (163 lb)	12 May 1989	(Italy) Despar Messina
7	Tania Di Mario (c)	D	1.68 m (5 ft 6 in)	62 kg (137 lb)	4 May 1979	(Italy) L'Ekipe Orizzonte
8	Roberta Bianconi	CB	1.76 m (5 ft 9 in)	76 kg (168 lb)	8 July 1989	(Greece) Olympiacos
9	Giulia Emmolo	D	1.71 m (5 ft 7 in)	67 kg (148 lb)	16 October 1991	(Greece) Olympiacos
10	Francesca Pomeri	CF	1.74 m (5 ft 9 in)	76 kg (168 lb)	18 February 1993	(Italy) Città di Cosenza
11	Aleksandra Cotti	CF	1.67 m (5 ft 6 in)	65 kg (143 lb)	13 December 1988	(Italy) Rapallo Pallanuoto
12	Teresa Frassinetti	CF	1.78 m (5 ft 10 in)	75 kg (165 lb)	24 December 1985	(Italy) Rari Nantes Bogliasco
13	Laura Teani	GK	1.75 m (5 ft 9 in)	75 kg (165 lb)	13 March 1991	(Italy) Plebiscito Padova

=== Russia ===
The following is the Russian roster in the women's water polo tournament of the 2016 Summer Olympics.

Head coach: Alexandr Gaidukov

№	Name	Pos.	Height	Weight	Date of birth	2016 club
1	Anna Ustyukhina	GK	1.77 m (5 ft 10 in)	70 kg (154 lb)	18 March 1989	(Russia) SKIF-CSP Izmailovo
2	Nadezhda Fedotova	D	1.75 m (5 ft 9 in)	68 kg (150 lb)	20 May 1988	(Russia) Kinef Kirishi
3	Ekaterina Prokofyeva (c)	D	1.76 m (5 ft 9 in)	70 kg (154 lb)	13 March 1991	(Russia) Kinef Kirishi
4	Elvina Karimova	D	1.66 m (5 ft 5 in)	62 kg (137 lb)	25 March 1994	(Russia) Uralochka Zlatoust
5	Maria Borisova	D	1.84 m (6 ft 0 in)	95 kg (209 lb)	28 July 1997	(Russia) SKIF-CSP Izmailovo
6	Olga Belova	CB	1.69 m (5 ft 7 in)	60 kg (132 lb)	27 August 1993	(Russia) Uralochka Zlatoust
7	Ekaterina Lisunova	D	1.75 m (5 ft 9 in)	64 kg (141 lb)	6 October 1989	(Russia) Ugra Khanty-Mansiysk
8	Anastasia Simanovich	CF	1.74 m (5 ft 9 in)	69 kg (152 lb)	23 January 1995	(Russia) Kinef Kirishi
9	Anna Timofeeva	CF	1.78 m (5 ft 10 in)	86 kg (190 lb)	18 July 1987	(Russia) Ugra Khanty-Mansiysk
10	Evgenia Soboleva	CB	1.80 m (5 ft 11 in)	75 kg (165 lb)	26 August 1988	(Russia) Kinef Kirishi
11	Evgeniya Ivanova	D	1.76 m (5 ft 9 in)	67 kg (148 lb)	26 July 1987	(Russia) Kinef Kirishi
12	Anna Grineva	CB	1.85 m (6 ft 1 in)	87 kg (192 lb)	31 January 1988	(Russia) Spartak Volgograd
13	Anna Karnaukh	GK	1.73 m (5 ft 8 in)	61 kg (134 lb)	31 August 1993	(Russia) Kinef Kirishi

== Pool B ==
=== China ===
The following is the Chinese roster in the women's water polo tournament of the 2016 Summer Olympics.

Head coach: (Brazil) Ricardo Azevedo

№	Name	Pos.	Height	Weight	Date of birth	2016 club
1	Yang Jun	GK	1.80 m (5 ft 11 in)	69 kg (152 lb)	28 April 1988	(China) Tianjin
2	Ma Huanhuan	D	1.78 m (5 ft 10 in)	66 kg (146 lb)	13 January 1990	(China) Guangxi
3	Mei Xiaohan	CB	1.80 m (5 ft 11 in)	100 kg (220 lb)	11 November 1996	(China) Tianjin
4	Xiong Dunhan	CF	1.81 m (5 ft 11 in)	83 kg (183 lb)	11 November 1998	(China) Hunan
5	Niu Guannan	D	1.77 m (5 ft 10 in)	68 kg (150 lb)	10 May 1992	(China) Guangxi
6	Sun Yating	CF	1.78 m (5 ft 10 in)	76 kg (168 lb)	24 February 1988	(China) Tianjin
7	Song Donglun	D	1.78 m (5 ft 10 in)	83 kg (183 lb)	28 April 1991	(China) Tianjin
8	Zhang Cong	D	1.76 m (5 ft 9 in)	62 kg (137 lb)	3 May 1990	(China) Tianjin
9	Zhao Zihan	D	1.72 m (5 ft 8 in)	62 kg (137 lb)	4 September 1993	(China) Shanghai
10	Zhang Weiwei	D	1.82 m (6 ft 0 in)	66 kg (146 lb)	7 October 1990	(China) Sichuan
11	Wang Xinyan	CB	1.81 m (5 ft 11 in)	73 kg (161 lb)	26 April 1991	(China) Shanghai
12	Zhang Jing	D	1.66 m (5 ft 5 in)	62 kg (137 lb)	16 June 1996	(China) Fujian
13	Peng Lin	GK	1.85 m (6 ft 1 in)	73 kg (161 lb)	4 April 1995	(China) Hunan

=== Hungary ===
The following is the Hungarian roster in the women's water polo tournament of the 2016 Summer Olympics.

Head coach: Attila Bíró

№	Name	Pos.	Height	Weight	Date of birth	2016 club
1	Edina Gangl	GK	1.81 m (5 ft 11 in)	64 kg (141 lb)	25 June 1990	(Hungary) UVSE
2	Dóra Czigány	D	1.73 m (5 ft 8 in)	60 kg (132 lb)	23 October 1992	(Hungary) Eger
3	Dóra Antal	D	1.69 m (5 ft 7 in)	62 kg (137 lb)	9 September 1993	(Hungary) UVSE
4	Hanna Kisteleki	CF	1.72 m (5 ft 8 in)	63 kg (139 lb)	10 March 1991	(Hungary) UVSE
5	Gabriella Szűcs	D	1.83 m (6 ft 0 in)	74 kg (163 lb)	7 March 1988	(Hungary) UVSE
6	Orsolya Takács	CB	1.90 m (6 ft 3 in)	83 kg (183 lb)	20 May 1985	(Hungary) BVSC
7	Anna Illés	CB	1.80 m (5 ft 11 in)	73 kg (161 lb)	21 February 1994	(United States) California Golden Bears
8	Rita Keszthelyi (c)	D	1.78 m (5 ft 10 in)	67 kg (148 lb)	10 December 1991	(Hungary) UVSE
9	Ildikó Tóth	CF	1.75 m (5 ft 9 in)	72 kg (159 lb)	23 April 1987	(Hungary) UVSE
10	Barbara Bujka	CF	1.72 m (5 ft 8 in)	82 kg (181 lb)	5 September 1986	(Hungary) Szeged
11	Dóra Csabai	CB	1.75 m (5 ft 9 in)	63 kg (139 lb)	20 April 1989	(Hungary) UVSE
12	Krisztina Garda	CB	1.70 m (5 ft 7 in)	76 kg (168 lb)	16 July 1994	(Hungary) Dunaújvárosi Főiskola
13	Orsolya Kasó	GK	1.87 m (6 ft 2 in)	72 kg (159 lb)	22 November 1988	(Hungary) Dunaújvárosi Főiskola

=== Spain ===
The following is the Spanish roster in the women's water polo tournament of the 2016 Summer Olympics.

Head coach: Miki Oca

№	Name	Pos.	Height	Weight	Date of birth	Club
1	Laura Ester	GK	1.70 m (5 ft 7 in)	56 kg (123 lb)	22 January 1990	(Spain) Sabadell
2	Marta Bach	CB	1.76 m (5 ft 9 in)	66 kg (146 lb)	17 February 1993	(Spain) Mataró
3	Anna Espar	D	1.80 m (5 ft 11 in)	66 kg (146 lb)	8 January 1993	(Spain) Sabadell
4	Beatriz Ortiz	D	1.76 m (5 ft 9 in)	65 kg (143 lb)	21 June 1995	(Spain) Rubí
5	Matilde Ortiz	CB	1.74 m (5 ft 9 in)	64 kg (141 lb)	16 September 1990	(Spain) Sabadell
6	Paula Leitón	CF	1.87 m (6 ft 2 in)	93 kg (205 lb)	27 April 2000	(Spain) Terrassa
7	Clara Espar	D	1.77 m (5 ft 10 in)	70 kg (154 lb)	29 September 1994	(Spain) Sabadell
8	Pilar Peña	D	1.72 m (5 ft 8 in)	61 kg (134 lb)	4 April 1986	(Spain) Sabadell
9	Judith Forca	D	1.73 m (5 ft 8 in)	66 kg (146 lb)	7 June 1996	(Spain) Sabadell
10	Roser Tarragó	D	1.71 m (5 ft 7 in)	61 kg (134 lb)	25 March 1993	(Spain) Mataró
11	Maica García	CF	1.88 m (6 ft 2 in)	90 kg (198 lb)	17 October 1990	(Spain) Sabadell
12	Laura López	D	1.70 m (5 ft 7 in)	63 kg (139 lb)	13 January 1988	(Spain) Mataró
13	Patricia Herrera	GK	1.63 m (5 ft 4 in)	59 kg (130 lb)	9 February 1993	(Spain) Madrid Moscardó

=== United States ===
The following is the American roster in the women's water polo tournament of the 2016 Summer Olympics.

Head coach: Adam Krikorian

№	Name	Pos.	Height	Weight	Date of birth	2016 club
1	Samantha Hill	GK	1.80 m (5 ft 11 in)	89 kg (196 lb)	8 June 1992	(United States) Santa Barbara WP Foundation
2	Madeline Musselmann	D	1.80 m (5 ft 11 in)	61 kg (134 lb)	16 June 1998	(United States) Corona del Mar Aquatics
3	Melissa Seidemann	CB	1.83 m (6 ft 0 in)	104 kg (229 lb)	26 June 1990	(United States) New York Athletic Club
4	Rachel Fattal	D	1.72 m (5 ft 8 in)	66 kg (146 lb)	10 December 1993	(United States) SoCal
5	Caroline Clark	CB	1.88 m (6 ft 2 in)	73 kg (161 lb)	28 June 1990	(United States) New York Athletic Club
6	Maggie Steffens (c)	CB	1.75 m (5 ft 9 in)	70 kg (154 lb)	4 June 1993	(United States) New York Athletic Club
7	Courtney Mathewson	D	1.70 m (5 ft 7 in)	71 kg (157 lb)	14 September 1986	(United States) New York Athletic Club
8	Kiley Neushul	D	1.72 m (5 ft 8 in)	66 kg (146 lb)	5 March 1993	(United States) Santa Barbara WP Foundation
9	Aria Fischer	CF	1.83 m (6 ft 0 in)	65 kg (143 lb)	2 March 1999	(United States) SET Water Polo
10	Kaleigh Gilchrist	D	1.75 m (5 ft 9 in)	77 kg (170 lb)	16 May 1992	(United States) New York Athletic Club
11	Makenzie Fischer	CB	1.85 m (6 ft 1 in)	75 kg (165 lb)	29 March 1997	(United States) SET Water Polo
12	Kami Craig	CF	1.80 m (5 ft 11 in)	88 kg (194 lb)	21 July 1987	(United States) New York Athletic Club
13	Ashleigh Johnson	GK	1.85 m (6 ft 1 in)	86 kg (190 lb)	12 September 1994	(United States) New York Athletic Club

== See also ==
- Water polo at the 2016 Summer Olympics – Men's team rosters
