= 2017 Magyar Kupa (women's water polo) =

Hungarian water polo tournament

Hungarian Cup

Tournament details
- Country: Hungary
- Date: 28 October – 10 December 2017
- Teams: 10

Final positions
- Champions: UVSE (4th title)
- Runners-up: DUE-Maarks Graphics

Tournament statistics
- Top goal scorer(s): (Hungary) Gréta Gurisatti (34 goals)

The 2017 Magyar Kupa was the 18th edition of the tournament.

== Schedule ==
The rounds of the 2017 competition are scheduled as follows:

Round	Matches
Preliminary round	28–29 October 2017
Quarter-finals	11–12 November 2017
Final four	9–10 December 2017

== Final four ==
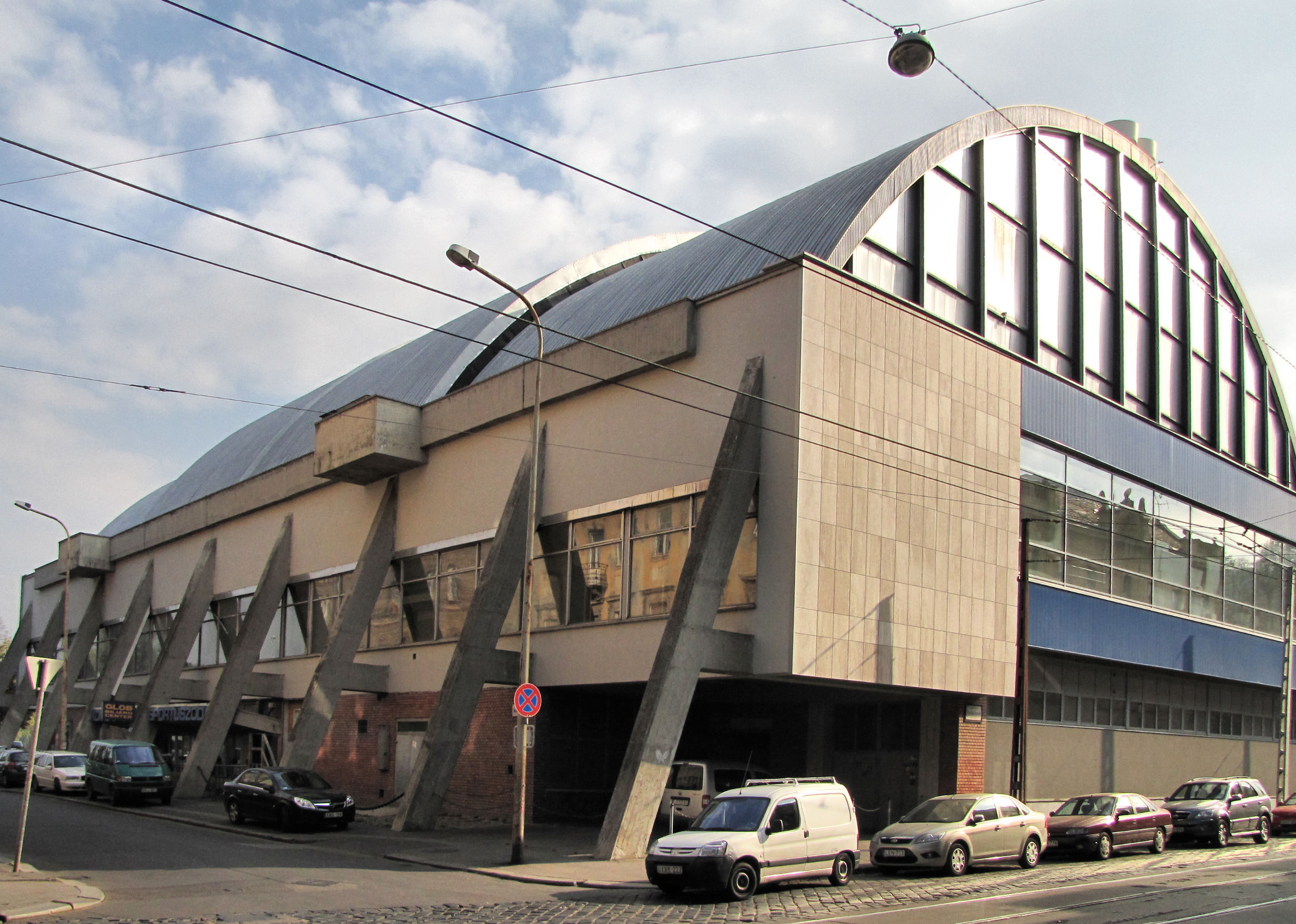
Császár-Komjádi Swimming Stadium, Budapest

The final four will be held on 9 and 10 December 2017 at the Császár-Komjádi Swimming Stadium in Budapest, II. ker.

Semi-finals
9 December, 14:00
FTC	7 (3)
UVSE (pen.)	7 (4)
9 December, 12:30
DUE-Maarks Graphics	10
BVSC-Zugló Diapolo	7

Final
10 December, 17:45
UVSE (pen.)	10 (4)
DUE-Maarks Graphics	10 (2)

=== Semi-finals ===
9 December 2017; 14:00 (CET)	Report	Ferencvárosi TC	7–7 ^{(3–4 PSO)} (PSO)	UVSE	Komjádi Béla Sportuszoda, Budapest; Attendance: 200; Referees: Csanádi, Marjay
9 December 2017; 14:00 (CET)	Report	Score by quarters: 3–2, 2–2, 0–1, 2–2 PSO: 3–4			Komjádi Béla Sportuszoda, Budapest; Attendance: 200; Referees: Csanádi, Marjay
9 December 2017; 14:00 (CET)	Report	Kisteleki, Kövesdi, Gémes 2	Goals	Tóth-Csabai, Sevenich 3	Komjádi Béla Sportuszoda, Budapest; Attendance: 200; Referees: Csanádi, Marjay

9 December 2017; 12:30 (CET)	Report	DUE-Maarks Graphics	10–7	BVSC-Zugló Diapolo	Komjádi Béla Sportuszoda, Budapest; Attendance: 150; Referees: Petik, Rubos
9 December 2017; 12:30 (CET)	Report	Score by quarters: 2–0, 2–1, 1–3, 5–3			Komjádi Béla Sportuszoda, Budapest; Attendance: 150; Referees: Petik, Rubos
9 December 2017; 12:30 (CET)	Report	Gurisatti 6	Goals	Hertzka 2	Komjádi Béla Sportuszoda, Budapest; Attendance: 150; Referees: Petik, Rubos

=== Final ===
10 December 2017; 17:45 (CET)	Report	UVSE	10–10 ^{(4–2 PSO)} (PSO)	DUE-Maarsk Graphics	Komjádi Béla Sportuszoda, Budapest; Attendance: 250; Referees: Berki, Fodor
10 December 2017; 17:45 (CET)	Report	Score by quarters: 3–1, 4–4, 3–3, 0–2 PSO: 4–2			Komjádi Béla Sportuszoda, Budapest; Attendance: 250; Referees: Berki, Fodor
10 December 2017; 17:45 (CET)	Report	Tóth-Csabai, Sevenich 2	Goals	Szilágyi 5	Komjádi Béla Sportuszoda, Budapest; Attendance: 250; Referees: Berki, Fodor

==== Final standings ====
	Team
	UVSE
Silver medal	DUE-Maarks Graphics
Bronze medal	Ferencvárosi TC
Bronze medal	BVSC-Zugló Diapolo

== See also ==
- 2017–18 Országos Bajnokság I (National Championship of Hungary)
