= 2018–19 Országos Bajnokság I (women's water polo) =

Hungarian water polo season

Női OB I
- Season: 2018–19
- Champions: UVSE-Hunguest Hotels (5th title)
- Top goalscorer: Rita Keszthelyi (69 goals)

The 2018–19 Országos Bajnokság I was the 36th season of the Országos Bajnokság I, Hungary's premier Water polo league.

== Team information ==
Location of teams in 2018-19 Országos Bajnokság I
Budapest OB I waterpolo teams

The following 9 clubs compete in the OB I during the 2018–19 season:

OB I
Team	City	Pool	Founded	Colours
BVSC	Budapest (XIV. ker)	Szőnyi úti uszoda	1911	
Dunaújváros	Dunaújváros	Fabó Éva Sportuszoda	1989	
Eger	Eger	Bitskey Aladár uszoda	1910	
FTC	Budapest (IX. ker)	Népligeti uszoda	1899	
Honvéd	Budapest (XIX. ker)	Kőér utcai uszoda	1950	
Szeged	Szeged	Ligetfürdő	1993	
Szentes	Szentes	Dr. Rébeli Szabó József Sportuszoda	1934	
Tatabánya	Tatabánya	Tatabányai Sportuszoda	1992	
UVSE	Budapest (IV. ker)	Hajós Alfréd Sportuszoda	2008	

=== Head coaches ===
Team	Head coach
BVSC	(Hungary) Mátyás Petrovics
Dunaújváros	(Hungary) Attila Mihók
Eger	(Hungary) Péter Biros
FTC	(Hungary) Gergely Béres
Honvéd	(Hungary) Szabolcs Dodog
Szeged	(Hungary) Tamás Varga
Szentes	(Hungary) László Vidumansky
Tatabánya	(Hungary) Krisztina Zantleitner
UVSE	(Hungary) Márton Benczur

== Regular season ==
Pos	Team	Pld	W	D	L	GF	GA	GD	Pts	Qualification
1	UVSE-Hunguest Hotels	16	16	0	0	243	100	+143	48	Qualification to the Semifinals
2	Dunaújvárosi Egyetem-Maarsk Graphics	16	13	0	3	223	108	+115	39	Qualification to the Semifinals
3	BVSC-Zugló Diapolo	16	11	1	4	217	100	+117	34 (Note: BVSC - FTC: 12–9; FTC - BVSC: 8–8)	Qualification to the Quarterfinals
4	FTC-Telekom	16	11	1	4	182	130	+52	34	Qualification to the Quarterfinals
5	ZF-Eger	16	8	0	8	159	149	+10	24	Qualification to the Quarterfinals
6	Hungerit Szentes	16	6	0	10	143	179	−36	18	Qualification to the Quarterfinals
7	Szeged SZTE	16	3	1	12	134	232	−98	10	
8	RB Tatabánya	16	2	1	13	73	188	−115	7	Qualification to Relegation playout
9	Budapesti Honvéd SE	16	0	0	16	91	279	−188	0	Qualification to Relegation playout

=== Schedule and results ===
In the table below the home teams are listed on the left and the away teams along the top.

Home \ Away	BHSE	BVSC	DFVE	EGER	FTC	SZEG	SZEN	UVSE	TVSE
Bp. Honvéd SE		2–20	4–27	6–19	9–16	7–14	9–11	5–26	5–9
BVSC-Zugló	24–8		7–8	14–8	12–9	20–8	18–6	8–9	17–1
Dunaújvárosi FVE	25–4	8–7		13–10	8–10	14–3	14–5	8–11	14–4
Egri VK	12–4	1–5	9–16		5–6	17–7	12–7	7–11	8–4
Ferencvárosi TC	21–4	8–8	8–14	14–10		17–10	13–7	9–12	10–0
Szegedi NVE	14–11	4–18	6–18	12–15	8–14		11–12	3–20	12–8
Szentesi VK	17–1	5–15	5–14	9–10	7–8	16–11		5–21	13–6
UVSE	19–8	13–9	11–8	14–4	9–7	19–5	12–8		19–3
Tatabányai VSE	5–4	2–15	4–14	7–12	7–12	6–6	4–10	3–17	

Legend: Blue = home team win; Yellow = draw; Red = away team win.

== Final round ==
=== Championship playoff ===
Teams in bold won the playoff series. Numbers to the left of each team indicate the team's original playoff seeding. Numbers to the right indicate the score of each playoff game.

Quarter-finals
4	**FTC-Telekom**	**9p**
5	ZF-Eger	0p
3	**BVSC-Zugló Diapolo**	**9p**
6	Hungerit Szentes	0p

Semi-finals
1	**UVSE-Hunguest Hotels**	**2**
4	FTC-Telekom	0
2	**DUE-Maarsk Graphics**	**2**
3	BVSC-Zugló Diapolo	1

**Finals**
1	**UVSE-Hunguest Hotels**	**3**
2	DUE-Maarsk Graphics	0
Third place
3	**BVSC-Zugló Diapolo**	**2**
4	FTC-Telekom	1

==== Quarter-finals ====
Team 1	Points	Team 2	Games in the season		Game 1	Game 2	Game 3
**BVSC-Zugló Diapolo** (3)	9–0	(6) Hungerit Szentes	18-6	15-5	14-4	／	／
**FTC-Telekom** (4)	9–0	(5) ZF-Eger	14-10	6-5	15-8	／	／

Game 1

17 March 2019; 18:30 (CET)	Report	**BVSC-Zugló Diapolo**	**14**–4	Hungerit Szentes	Szőnyi úti uszoda, Budapest; Referees: Marjay, Várkonyi
17 March 2019; 18:30 (CET)	Report	Score by quarters: **5**-0, **3**-2, **2**-1, **4**-1			Szőnyi úti uszoda, Budapest; Referees: Marjay, Várkonyi
17 March 2019; 18:30 (CET)	Report	Kuna 4	**Goals**	Mihály 2	Szőnyi úti uszoda, Budapest; Referees: Marjay, Várkonyi

BVSC-Zugló Diapolo won the series 9–0 with points ratio, and advanced to the Semifinals.

16 March 2019; 14:30 (CET)	Report	**FTC-Telekom**	**15**–8	ZF-Eger	Népligeti uszoda, Budapest; Referees: Bereczki, Berki
16 March 2019; 14:30 (CET)	Report	Score by quarters: **5**-2, **4**-3, **3**-1, **3**-2			Népligeti uszoda, Budapest; Referees: Bereczki, Berki
16 March 2019; 14:30 (CET)	Report	Bujka 4	**Goals**	Ráski 3	Népligeti uszoda, Budapest; Referees: Bereczki, Berki

FTC-Telekom Waterpolo won the series 9–0 with points ratio, and advanced to the Semifinals.

==== Semi-finals ====
Higher ranked team hosted Game 1 plus Game 3 if necessary. The lower ranked hosted Game 2.

Team 1	Agg.	Team 2	Game 1	Game 2	Game 3
**UVSE-Hunguest Hotels**	2–0	FTC-Telekom	17-8	11-8	／
**DUE-Maarsk Graphics**	2–1	BVSC-Zugló Diapolo	11-10	7-10	11-10 (p)

Game 1

6 April 2019; 19:00 (CEST)	Report	**UVSE-Hunguest Hotels**	**17**–8	FTC-Telekom Waterpolo	Hajós Alfréd Sportuszoda, Budapest; Referees: Fodor, Csanádi
6 April 2019; 19:00 (CEST)	Report	Score by quarters: **2**-1, **4**-1, **7**-3, **4**-3			Hajós Alfréd Sportuszoda, Budapest; Referees: Fodor, Csanádi
6 April 2019; 19:00 (CEST)	Report	Keszthelyi 4	**Goals**	Tóth-Csabai, Bujka 2	Hajós Alfréd Sportuszoda, Budapest; Referees: Fodor, Csanádi

6 April 2019; 17:00 (CEST)	Report	**Dunaújvárosi Egyetem-Maarsk Graphics**	**11**–10	BVSC-Zugló Diapolo	Szőnyi úti uszoda, Budapest; Referees: Várkonyi, Marjay
6 April 2019; 17:00 (CEST)	Report	Score by quarters: 2-**3**, 3-3, **4**-1, 2-**3**			Szőnyi úti uszoda, Budapest; Referees: Várkonyi, Marjay
6 April 2019; 17:00 (CEST)	Report	Vályi 4	**Goals**	Illés 3	Szőnyi úti uszoda, Budapest; Referees: Várkonyi, Marjay

Game 2

17 April 2019; 20:15 (CEST)	Report	FTC-Telekom Waterpolo	8–**11**	**UVSE-Hunguest Hotels**	Népligeti uszoda, Budapest; Referees: Debreceni, Tóth
17 April 2019; 20:15 (CEST)	Report	Score by quarters: 3-3, 1-**3**, 3-3, 1-**2**			Népligeti uszoda, Budapest; Referees: Debreceni, Tóth
17 April 2019; 20:15 (CEST)	Report	Mihailović 3	**Goals**	Neushul 3	Népligeti uszoda, Budapest; Referees: Debreceni, Tóth

UVSE-Hunguest Hotels won the series 2–0, and advanced to the Finals.

9 April 2019; 18:30 (CEST)	Report	**BVSC-Zugló Diapolo**	**10**–7	Dunaújvárosi Egyetem-Maarsk Graphics	Szőnyi úti uszoda, Budapest; Referees: Rubos, Kovács Cs.
9 April 2019; 18:30 (CEST)	Report	Score by quarters: 2-2, 1-**2**, **5**-1, 2-2			Szőnyi úti uszoda, Budapest; Referees: Rubos, Kovács Cs.
9 April 2019; 18:30 (CEST)	Report	Gyöngyösi, Farkas, Kuna 2	**Goals**	Garda, Menczinger 2	Szőnyi úti uszoda, Budapest; Referees: Rubos, Kovács Cs.

Game 3

13 April 2019; 15:00 (CEST)	Report	**Dunaújvárosi Egyetem-Maarsk Graphics**	8–8 ^{(3–2 PSO)} (PSO)	BVSC-Zugló Diapolo	Komjádi Béla Sportuszoda, Budapest; Referees: Homonnai, Debreceni
13 April 2019; 15:00 (CEST)	Report	Score by quarters: **4**-3, **2**-1, 1-**3**, 1-1 PSO: **3**–2			Komjádi Béla Sportuszoda, Budapest; Referees: Homonnai, Debreceni
13 April 2019; 15:00 (CEST)	Report	four players 2	**Goals**	Gyöngyösi 4	Komjádi Béla Sportuszoda, Budapest; Referees: Homonnai, Debreceni

Dunaújvárosi Egyetem-Maarsk Graphics won the series 2–1, and advanced to the Finals.

==== Finals ====
Higher ranked team hosted Game 1 and Game 3 plus Game 5 if necessary. The lower ranked hosted Game 2 plus Game 4 if necessary.

Team 1	Agg.	Team 2	Game 1	Game 2	Game 3	Game 4	Game 5
**UVSE-Hunguest Hotels**	3–0	DUE-Maarsk Graphics	13-9	9-5	11-7	／	／

26 April 2019; 18:45 (CEST)	Report	**UVSE-Hunguest Hotels**	**13**–9	Dunaújvárosi Egyetem-Maarsk Graphics	Hajós Alfréd Sportuszoda, Budapest; Referees: Füzesi, Fodor
26 April 2019; 18:45 (CEST)	Report	Score by quarters: **2**-0, **5**-3, 2-2, 4-4			Hajós Alfréd Sportuszoda, Budapest; Referees: Füzesi, Fodor
26 April 2019; 18:45 (CEST)	Report	Keszthelyi 4	**Goals**	Garda 2	Hajós Alfréd Sportuszoda, Budapest; Referees: Füzesi, Fodor

30 April 2019; 18:45 (CEST)	Report	Dunaújvárosi Egyetem-Maarsk Graphics	5–**9**	**UVSE-Hunguest Hotels**	Hajós Alfréd Sportuszoda, Budapest; Referees: Homonnai, Rubos
30 April 2019; 18:45 (CEST)	Report	Score by quarters: 1-1, 2-**3**, 1-**4**, 1-1			Hajós Alfréd Sportuszoda, Budapest; Referees: Homonnai, Rubos
30 April 2019; 18:45 (CEST)	Report	Garda 2	**Goals**	Keszthelyi 3	Hajós Alfréd Sportuszoda, Budapest; Referees: Homonnai, Rubos

4 May 2019; 15:00 (CEST)	Report	**UVSE-Hunguest Hotels**	**11**–7	Dunaújvárosi Egyetem-Maarsk Graphics	Hajós Alfréd Sportuszoda, Budapest; Referees: Várkonyi, Tóth
4 May 2019; 15:00 (CEST)	Report	Score by quarters: **2**-0, **5**-4, **2**-0, 2-**3**			Hajós Alfréd Sportuszoda, Budapest; Referees: Várkonyi, Tóth
4 May 2019; 15:00 (CEST)	Report	Keszthelyi, Faragó, Neushul 3	**Goals**	Menczinger, Mahieu 2	Hajós Alfréd Sportuszoda, Budapest; Referees: Várkonyi, Tóth

UVSE-Hunguest Hotels won the Final series 3–0.

==== Third place ====
Higher ranked team hosted Game 1 plus Game 3 if necessary. The lower ranked hosted Game 2.

Team 1	Agg.	Team 2	Game 1	Game 2	Game 3
**BVSC-Zugló Diapolo**	2–1	FTC-Telekom	11-13	11-6	9-7

27 April 2019; 17:00 (CEST)	Report	BVSC-Zugló Diapolo	11–**13**	**FTC-Telekom Waterpolo**	Szőnyi úti uszoda, Budapest; Referees: Debreceni, Marjay
27 April 2019; 17:00 (CEST)	Report	Score by quarters: **3**-2, 4-**5**, 3-**5**, 1-1			Szőnyi úti uszoda, Budapest; Referees: Debreceni, Marjay
27 April 2019; 17:00 (CEST)	Report	Illés 3	**Goals**	Tóth-Csabai 5	Szőnyi úti uszoda, Budapest; Referees: Debreceni, Marjay

1 May 2019; 18:30 (CEST)	Report	FTC-Telekom Waterpolo	6–**11**	**BVSC-Zugló Diapolo**	Komjádi Béla Sportuszoda, Budapest; Referees: Fodor, Marnitz
1 May 2019; 18:30 (CEST)	Report	Score by quarters: 0-**4**, 2-2, 2-**3**, 2-2			Komjádi Béla Sportuszoda, Budapest; Referees: Fodor, Marnitz
1 May 2019; 18:30 (CEST)	Report	Muzsnay 3	**Goals**	Leimeter 3	Komjádi Béla Sportuszoda, Budapest; Referees: Fodor, Marnitz

4 May 2019; 18:00 (CEST)	Report	**BVSC-Zugló Diapolo**	**9**–7	FTC-Telekom Waterpolo	Szőnyi úti uszoda, Budapest; Referees: Rubos, Kovács Cs.
4 May 2019; 18:00 (CEST)	Report	Score by quarters: 2-**3**, **5**-1, **2**-1, 0-**2**			Szőnyi úti uszoda, Budapest; Referees: Rubos, Kovács Cs.
4 May 2019; 18:00 (CEST)	Report	Leimeter 3	**Goals**	Bujka 2	Szőnyi úti uszoda, Budapest; Referees: Rubos, Kovács Cs.

BVSC-Zugló Diapolo won the Third place.

=== 5th – 8th Placement matches ===
Relegation playout
8	**RB Tatabánya**	**9p**
9	Budapesti Honvéd SE	6p

5th–8th placement matches
6	Hungerit Szentes
8	RB Tatabánya
5	ZF-Eger
7	Szeged SZTE

5th place match
6	Hungerit Szentes
5	ZF-Eger
7th place match
7	Szeged SZTE
8	RB Tatabánya

==== Relegation playout ====
Higher ranked team hosted Game 1 plus Game 3 if necessary. The lower ranked hosted Game 2.

Team 1	Points	Team 2	Games in the season		Game 1	Game 2	Game 3
**RB Tatabánya** (8)	9–6	(9) Budapesti Honvéd SE	5-4	9-5	4-5	7-8	7-5

==== 5th – 8th Placement matches ====
Higher ranked team hosted Game 1 plus Game 3 if necessary. The lower ranked hosted Game 2.

Team 1	Agg.	Team 2	Game 1	Game 2	Game 3
**Hungerit Szentes** (6)	2–0	(8) RB Tatabánya	10-4	15-7	／
**ZF-Eger** (5)	2–1	(7) Szeged SZTE	9-7	13-14 (p)	16-10

Fifth place game

Team 1	Agg.	Team 2	Game 1	Game 2	Game 3
ZF-Eger	2–0	Hungerit Szentes	8-5	10-5	／

Seventh place game

Team 1	Agg.	Team 2	Game 1	Game 2	Game 3
**Szeged SZTE**	2–1	RB Tatabánya	15-7	5-6	4-3

== Season statistics ==
=== Top goalscorers ===
As of 6 May 2019.

Rank	Player	Team	Goals
1	(Hungary) Rita Keszthelyi	UVSE	69
2	(Hungary) Dorottya Szilágyi	Eger	56
3	(Hungary) Gréta Gurisatti	Dunaújváros	53
4	(Hungary) Barbara Bujka	FTC	52
5	(Hungary) Dominika Lengyel	Szeged	50
6	(Hungary) Szonja Kuna	BVSC	47
6	(Hungary) Dóra Tóth-Csabai	FTC	47
8	(Hungary) Krisztina Garda	Dunaújváros	46
9	(Hungary) Vanda Vályi	Dunaújváros	45
10	(Hungary) Dóra Leimeter	BVSC	43

=== Points classification ===
As of 27 May 2018.

Rank	Player	Team	Rating
1	(Hungary) Rita Keszthelyi	UVSE	83.1
2	(Hungary) Szonja Kuna	BVSC	62.7
3	(Hungary) Gréta Gurisatti	Dunaújváros	60.2
4	(Hungary) Barbara Bujka	FTC	56.4
5	(Hungary) Dorottya Szilágyi	Eger	54.5
6	(Hungary) Anikó Gyöngyössy	BVSC	50.6
7	(Hungary) Vanda Vályi	Dunaújváros	48.9
8	(Hungary) Kamilla Faragó	UVSE	46.7
9	(Hungary) Dóra Tóth-Csabai	FTC	43.7
10	(Hungary) Lilla Ráski	Eger	40.9

=== Number of teams by counties ===
Pos.	County (megye)	No. of teams	Teams
1	Budapest (capital)	4	BVSC, FTC, Honvéd and UVSE
2	Csongrád	2	Szegedi NVE and Szentesi VK
3	Fejér	1	Dunaújvárosi FVE
3	Heves	1	Egri VK
3	Komárom-Esztergom	1	Tatabányai VSE

== See also ==
- 2018 Magyar Kupa (National Cup of Hungary)
- 2018 Szuperkupa (Super Cup of Hungary)
