= 2018 Magyar Kupa (women's water polo) =

Water polo tournament

Hungarian Cup

Tournament details
- Country: Hungary
- Date: 27 October – 16 December 2018
- Teams: 11

Final positions
- Champions: UVSE (5th title)
- Runners-up: BVSC

Tournament statistics
- Top goal scorer: (Hungary) Barbara Bujka (17 goals)

The 2018 Magyar Kupa was the 19th edition of the tournament.

== Schedule ==
The rounds of the 2018 competition are scheduled as follows:

Round	Matches
Preliminary round	27–28 October 2018
Quarter-finals	17–18 November 2018
Final four	14–16 December 2018

== Preliminary round ==
The preliminary round ties were scheduled for 27–28 October 2018.

=== Group A ===
Tournament was played at Bitskey Aladár uszoda, Eger.

Team	Pld	W	D	L	GF	GA	GD	Pts
FTC-Telekom	3	3	0	0	42	23	+19	9
ZF-Eger	3	2	0	1	45	22	+23	6
RB Tatabánya	3	1	0	2	16	38	−22	3
III. Kerületi TVE	3	0	0	3	23	43	−20	0

=== Group B ===
Tournament was played at Kőér utcai uszoda, Budapest.

Team	Pld	W	D	L	GF	GA	GD	Pts
Hungerit Szentes	2	2	0	0	27	7	+20	6
Szeged SZTE	2	1	0	1	18	22	−4	3
Budapesti Honvéd SE	2	0	0	3	13	29	−16	0

== Quarter-finals ==
The quarter-final matches were played on 17 and 18 November 2018.

Team 1	Agg.	Team 2	1st leg	2nd leg
ZF-Eger (I)	24–25	FTC-Telekom (I)	12–11	12–14
DUE-Maarks Graphics (I)	35–6	Szeged SZTE (I)	16–4	19–2
UVSE-Hunguest Hotels (I)	27–11	RB Tatabánya (I)	21–3	6–8
BVSC-Zugló Diapolo (I)	33–14	Hungerit Szentes (I)	15–8	18–6

== Final four ==
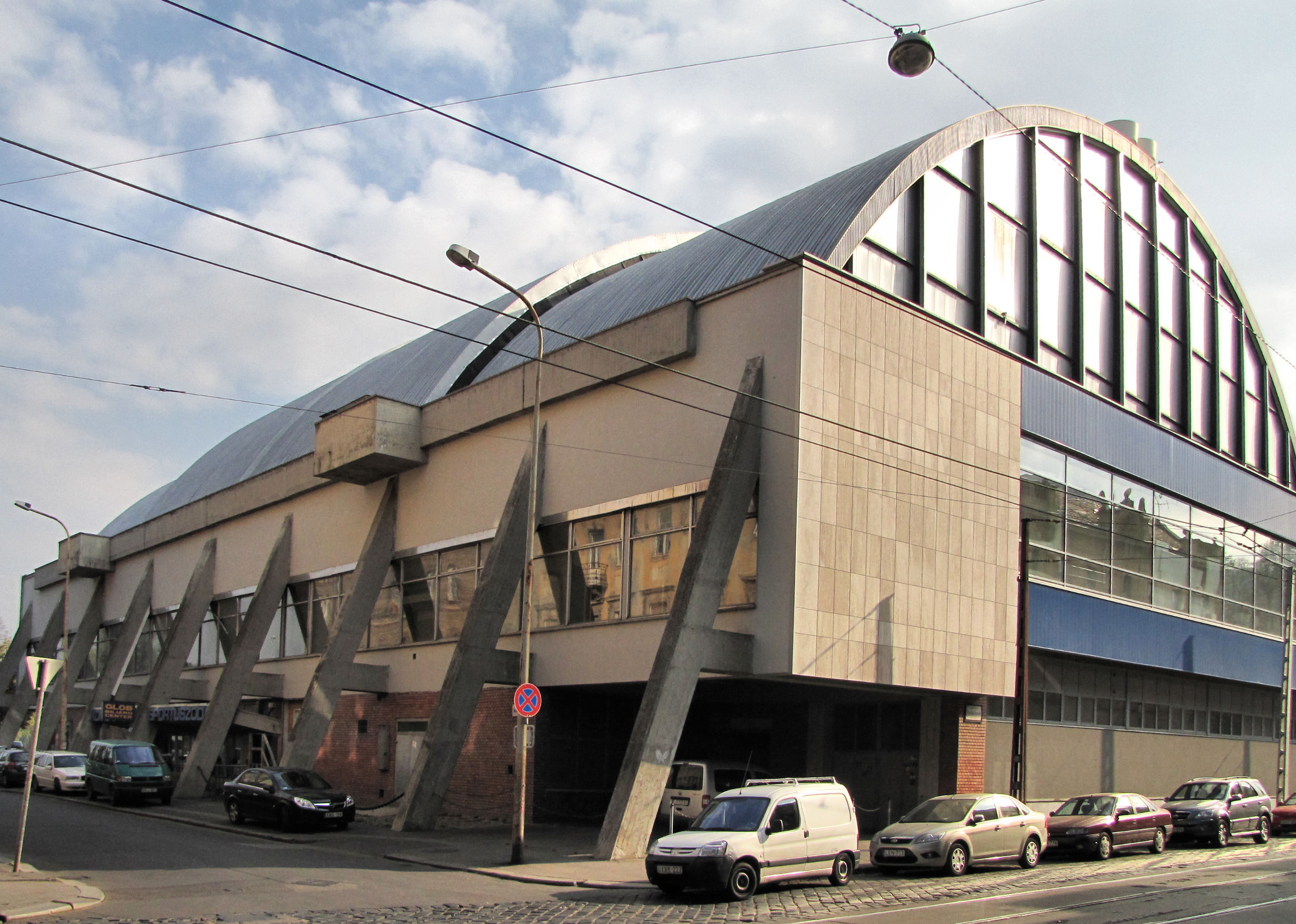
Császár-Komjádi Swimming Stadium, Budapest

The semi-finals were held on 14 at the Tüskecsarnok Uszoda in Budapest, XI. ker. The final was held on 16 December 2018 at the Császár-Komjádi Swimming Stadium in Budapest, II. ker.

Semi-finals
14 December, 16:00
UVSE-Hunguest Hotels	11
FTC-Telekom	9
14 December, 17:30
DUE-Maarks Graphics	11
BVSC-Zugló Diapolo	12

Final
16 December, 14:00
UVSE-Hunguest Hotels	10
BVSC-Zugló Diapolo	5

=== Semi-finals ===
14 December 2018; 16:00 (CET)	Report	UVSE-Hunguest Hotels	11–9	FTC-Telekom	Tüskecsarnok Uszoda, Budapest; Attendance: 400; Referees: Füzesi, Kenéz
14 December 2018; 16:00 (CET)	Report	Score by quarters: 4–1, 2–2, 2–2, 3–4			Tüskecsarnok Uszoda, Budapest; Attendance: 400; Referees: Füzesi, Kenéz
14 December 2018; 16:00 (CET)	Report	Szűcs 3	Goals	Bujka 3	Tüskecsarnok Uszoda, Budapest; Attendance: 400; Referees: Füzesi, Kenéz

14 December 2018; 15:30 (CET)	Report	Dunaújvárosi Egyetem-Maarks Graphics	11–12	BVSC-Zugló Diapolo	Tüskecsarnok Uszoda, Budapest; Attendance: 400; Referees: Várkonyi, Homonnai
14 December 2018; 15:30 (CET)	Report	Score by quarters: 0–2, 3–2, 3–2, 5–6			Tüskecsarnok Uszoda, Budapest; Attendance: 400; Referees: Várkonyi, Homonnai
14 December 2018; 15:30 (CET)	Report	Garda 4	Goals	Illés 3	Tüskecsarnok Uszoda, Budapest; Attendance: 400; Referees: Várkonyi, Homonnai

=== Final ===
16 December 2018; 14:00 (CET)	Report	UVSE-Hunguest Hotels	10–5	BVSC-Zugló Diapolo	Komjádi Béla Sportuszoda, Budapest; Attendance: 600; Referees: Berki, Rubos
16 December 2018; 14:00 (CET)	Report	Score by quarters: 3–0, 1–0, 2–1, 4–4			Komjádi Béla Sportuszoda, Budapest; Attendance: 600; Referees: Berki, Rubos
16 December 2018; 14:00 (CET)	Report	Szűcs 3	Goals	five players 1	Komjádi Béla Sportuszoda, Budapest; Attendance: 600; Referees: Berki, Rubos

==== Final standings ====
	Team
	UVSE-Hunguest Hotels
Silver medal	BVSC-Zugló Diapolo
Bronze medal	FTC-Telekom Waterpolo
Bronze medal	Dunaújvárosi Egyetem-Maarks Graphics

2018 Magyar Kupa
Winner
UVSE
5th title

Gangl – K. Faragó, E. Kiss, Rybanská, Sevenich, Keszthelyi (c), G. Szűcs
Reserves: Antal, V. Baksa, Peresztegi-Nagy, D. Telek, Mucsy, Lantos, Maczkó (goalkeeper)
Head coach: Márton Benczur

== See also ==
- 2018–19 Országos Bajnokság I (National Championship of Hungary)
- 2018 Szuperkupa (Super Cup of Hungary)
