= 2017–18 Women's LEN Trophy =

Water polo tournament

- League: Women's LEN Trophy
- Sport: Water Polo
- Duration: 13–14 April 2018
- Number of teams: 4 (from 4 countries)
- Finals champions: (Hungary) Dunaújváros (1st title)
- Runners-up: (Greece) Olympiacos

Women's LEN Trophy seasons
- ← 2016–17 2018−19 →

The 2017–18 Women's LEN Trophy was the 19th edition of the European second-tier tournament for women's water polo clubs. It was contested in Mataró, Spain, on 13 and 14 April 2018.

Dunaújváros achieved the first continental trophy of its history. The Hungarian team won the semifinal against host CN Mataró and the final match against Greece's Olympiacos.

== Teams ==
The tournament was contested by the four teams eliminated from the Euro League's quarterfinals.

Team 1	Agg.	Team 2	1st leg	2nd leg
UVSE (Hungary)	15–13	(Italy) Plebiscito Padova	7–7	8–6
CN Sabadell (Spain)	23–9	(Spain) CN Mataró	12–3	11–6
Dunaújváros (Hungary)	28–29	(Italy) Orizzonte Catania	10–13	18–16
Kinef Kirishi (Russia)	21–20	(Greece) Olympiacos	10–10	11–10

Final 4
(Greece) Olympiacos
(Hungary) Dunaújváros
(Italy) Plebiscito Padova
(Spain) CN Mataró

== Final Four ==
Mataró was chosen by LEN as host of tournament on 20 March, while the draw was held during Europa Cup's Superfinal, in Pontevedra, on 24 March 2018.

=== Semifinals ===
13 Apr 2018; 15:00 (UTC+2)	Report	Plebiscito Padova (Italy)	4–10	(Greece) Olympiacos	Piscina Joan Serra (Mataró); Referees: de Jong (NED), Mustata (ROU)
13 Apr 2018; 15:00 (UTC+2)	Report	Score by quarters: 2–1, 0–1, 1–6, 1–2			Piscina Joan Serra (Mataró); Referees: de Jong (NED), Mustata (ROU)
13 Apr 2018; 15:00 (UTC+2)	Report	2: Tielmann; 1: Barzon, Sohi	Goals	3: Emmolo; 2: Avramidou, Tsoukala	Piscina Joan Serra (Mataró); Referees: de Jong (NED), Mustata (ROU)

13 Apr 2018; 17:00 (UTC+2)	Report	CN Mataró (Spain)	7–11	(Hungary) Dunaújváros	Piscina Joan Serra (Mataró); Referees: Mauss (GER), Sadekov (RUS)
13 Apr 2018; 17:00 (UTC+2)	Report	Score by quarters: 0–4, 0–2, 3–3, 4–2			Piscina Joan Serra (Mataró); Referees: Mauss (GER), Sadekov (RUS)
13 Apr 2018; 17:00 (UTC+2)	Report	3: Gibson-Byrne; 1: four players	Goals	3: Szilágyi, Mahieu; 2: Ziegler	Piscina Joan Serra (Mataró); Referees: Mauss (GER), Sadekov (RUS)

=== Finals ===
==== 3rd place ====
14 Apr 2018; 11:30 (UTC+2)	Report	Plebiscito Padova (Italy)	8–11	(Spain) CN Mataró	Piscina Joan Serra (Mataró); Referees: Sadekov (RUS), Mustata (ROU)
14 Apr 2018; 11:30 (UTC+2)	Report	Score by quarters: 3–4, 1–3, 2–2, 2–2			Piscina Joan Serra (Mataró); Referees: Sadekov (RUS), Mustata (ROU)
14 Apr 2018; 11:30 (UTC+2)	Report	2: Queirolo, Tielmann; 1: four players	Goals	2: Vicente, Lloret, Cambray, Gibson-Byrne, Dance	Piscina Joan Serra (Mataró); Referees: Sadekov (RUS), Mustata (ROU)

==== 1st place ====
14 Apr 2018; 14:00 (UTC+2)	Report	Olympiacos (Greece)	11–13	(Hungary) Dunaújváros	Piscina Joan Serra (Mataró); Referees: Mauss (GER), de Jong (NED)
14 Apr 2018; 14:00 (UTC+2)	Report	Score by quarters: 4–4, 1–3, 4–3, 2–3			Piscina Joan Serra (Mataró); Referees: Mauss (GER), de Jong (NED)
14 Apr 2018; 14:00 (UTC+2)	Report	4: Avramidou; 3: Eggens	Goals	4: Garda; 3: Szilágyi	Piscina Joan Serra (Mataró); Referees: Mauss (GER), de Jong (NED)

2017–18 Women's LEN Trophy
Champions

Dunaújváros
1st title

== See also ==
- 2017–18 LEN Euro League Women
- 2017–18 LEN Euro Cup
