= Water polo at the 2016 Summer Olympics – Men's team rosters =

These are the rosters of all participating teams at the men's water polo tournament at the 2016 Summer Olympics in Rio de Janeiro.

Abbreviations
Pos.	Position	№	Cap number
CF	Centre Forward	CB	Centre Back
D	Defense	GK	Goalkeeper

== Pool A ==
=== Australia ===
The following is the Australian roster in the men's water polo tournament of the 2016 Summer Olympics. Nathan Power was originally named, but was replaced by Tyler Martin after injuring his hand during a pre-games training camp in Croatia.

Head coach: (Croatia) Elvis Fatović

№	Name	Pos.	Height	Weight	Date of birth	2016 club
1	Joel Dennerley	GK	1.95 m (6 ft 5 in)	91 kg (201 lb)	25 June 1987	(Australia) UNSW Wests Magpies
2	Richie Campbell	CB	1.93 m (6 ft 4 in)	99 kg (218 lb)	28 September 1987	(Australia) UNSW Wests Magpies
3	George Ford	CB	1.92 m (6 ft 4 in)	95 kg (209 lb)	24 February 1993	(Australia) UWA Torpedoes
4	Johnno Cotterill	D	1.93 m (6 ft 4 in)	88 kg (194 lb)	27 October 1987	(Australia) Sydney University Lions
5	Tyler Martin	CF	2.00 m (6 ft 7 in)	108 kg (238 lb)	13 February 1993	(Australia) UNSW Wests Magpies
6	Jarrod Gilchrist	D	1.89 m (6 ft 2 in)	90 kg (198 lb)	13 June 1990	(Australia) UNSW Wests Magpies
7	Aidan Roach	D	1.87 m (6 ft 2 in)	88 kg (194 lb)	7 September 1990	(Australia) Drummoyne Devils
8	Aaron Younger	D	1.93 m (6 ft 4 in)	100 kg (220 lb)	25 September 1991	(Hungary) Szolnoki Dózsa
9	Joel Swift	D	1.90 m (6 ft 3 in)	103 kg (227 lb)	14 June 1990	(Australia) Fremantle Mariners
10	Joe Kayes	CF	1.98 m (6 ft 6 in)	125 kg (276 lb)	3 January 1991	(Australia) Cronulla Sharks
11	Rhys Howden	D	1.89 m (6 ft 2 in)	84 kg (185 lb)	2 April 1987	(Australia) Brisbane Barracudas
12	Mitchell Emery	D	1.85 m (6 ft 1 in)	89 kg (196 lb)	27 September 1990	(Australia) Drummoyne Devils
13	James Stanton	GK	2.00 m (6 ft 7 in)	93 kg (205 lb)	21 July 1983	(Australia) Victorian Seals

=== Brazil ===
The following is the Brazilian roster in the men's water polo tournament of the 2016 Summer Olympics.

Head coach: (Croatia) Ratko Rudić

№	Name	Pos.	Height	Weight	Date of birth	2016 club
1	Slobodan Soro	GK	1.96 m (6 ft 5 in)	100 kg (220 lb)	23 December 1978	(Brazil) Botafogo
2	Jonas Crivella	D	1.86 m (6 ft 1 in)	79 kg (174 lb)	30 April 1988	(Brazil) Botafogo
3	Rudá Franco	D	1.85 m (6 ft 1 in)	90 kg (198 lb)	25 July 1986	(Brazil) SESI São Paulo
4	Ives González	CF	1.91 m (6 ft 3 in)	102 kg (225 lb)	12 October 1980	(Brazil) Pinheiros
5	Paulo Salemi	CB	1.91 m (6 ft 3 in)	94 kg (207 lb)	8 August 1993	(Brazil) Botafogo
6	Bernardo Gomes	D	1.91 m (6 ft 3 in)	98 kg (216 lb)	12 November 1993	(Brazil) Botafogo
7	Adrià Delgado	D	1.88 m (6 ft 2 in)	88 kg (194 lb)	7 April 1990	(Brazil) Pinheiros
8	Felipe Silva	CB	1.92 m (6 ft 4 in)	94 kg (207 lb)	8 August 1984	(Brazil) Pinheiros
9	Bernardo Rocha	CB	1.84 m (6 ft 0 in)	96 kg (212 lb)	3 July 1989	(Brazil) SESI São Paulo
10	Felipe Perrone (c)	D	1.83 m (6 ft 0 in)	94 kg (207 lb)	27 February 1986	(Brazil) Botafogo
11	Gustavo Guimarães	D	1.86 m (6 ft 1 in)	89 kg (196 lb)	24 January 1994	(Brazil) Pinheiros
12	Josip Vrlić	CF	1.96 m (6 ft 5 in)	120 kg (265 lb)	25 April 1986	(Brazil) Botafogo
13	Vinicius Antonelli	GK	1.82 m (6 ft 0 in)	88 kg (194 lb)	1 May 1990	(Brazil) Pinheiros

=== Greece ===
The following is the Greek roster in the men's water polo tournament of the 2016 Summer Olympics.

Head coach: Thodoris Vlachos

№	Name	Pos.	Height	Weight	Date of birth	2016 club
1	Konstantinos Flegkas	GK	1.92 m (6 ft 4 in)	88 kg (194 lb)	17 July 1988	(Greece) Ydraikos
2	Emmanouil Mylonakis	D	1.85 m (6 ft 1 in)	75 kg (165 lb)	9 April 1985	(Greece) Olympiacos
3	Georgios Dervisis	CB	1.95 m (6 ft 5 in)	92 kg (203 lb)	30 October 1994	(Greece) Olympiacos
4	Konstantinos Genidounias	D	1.83 m (6 ft 0 in)	87 kg (192 lb)	3 May 1993	(Greece) Olympiacos
5	Ioannis Fountoulis	D	1.86 m (6 ft 1 in)	90 kg (198 lb)	28 May 1988	(Greece) Olympiacos
6	Kyriakos Pontikeas	CB	1.92 m (6 ft 4 in)	84 kg (185 lb)	9 May 1991	(Greece) Olympiacos
7	Christos Afroudakis (c)	D	1.88 m (6 ft 2 in)	88 kg (194 lb)	23 May 1984	(Greece) Vouliagmeni
8	Evangelos Delakas	CB	1.89 m (6 ft 2 in)	90 kg (198 lb)	8 February 1985	(Greece) Olympiacos
9	Konstantinos Mourikis	CF	1.97 m (6 ft 6 in)	109 kg (240 lb)	11 July 1988	(Greece) Olympiacos
10	Christodoulos Kolomvos	CF	1.86 m (6 ft 1 in)	103 kg (227 lb)	26 October 1988	(Greece) Olympiacos
11	Alexandros Gounas	D	1.79 m (5 ft 10 in)	73 kg (161 lb)	3 October 1989	(Greece) Olympiacos
12	Angelos Vlachopoulos	D	1.79 m (5 ft 10 in)	75 kg (165 lb)	28 September 1991	(Italy) Posillipo
13	Stefanos Galanopoulos	GK	1.97 m (6 ft 6 in)	89 kg (196 lb)	22 February 1993	(Greece) Olympiacos

=== Hungary ===
The following is the Hungarian roster in the men's water polo tournament of the 2016 Summer Olympics.

Head coach: Tibor Benedek

№	Name	Pos.	Height	Weight	Date of birth	2016 club
1	Viktor Nagy	GK	1.98 m (6 ft 6 in)	100 kg (220 lb)	24 July 1984	(Hungary) Szolnoki Dózsa
2	Gergő Zalánki	CB	1.92 m (6 ft 4 in)	85 kg (187 lb)	26 February 1995	(Hungary) Orvosegyetem
3	Krisztián Manhercz	D	1.85 m (6 ft 1 in)	84 kg (185 lb)	6 February 1997	(Hungary) Szeged
4	Balázs Erdélyi	D	1.96 m (6 ft 5 in)	94 kg (207 lb)	16 February 1990	(Hungary) Eger
5	Márton Vámos	D	1.99 m (6 ft 6 in)	105 kg (231 lb)	24 June 1992	(Hungary) Szolnoki Dózsa
6	Norbert Hosnyánszky	D	1.96 m (6 ft 5 in)	101 kg (223 lb)	4 March 1984	(Hungary) Eger
7	Ádám Decker	D	2.03 m (6 ft 8 in)	110 kg (243 lb)	29 February 1984	(Hungary) Eger
8	Márton Szívós	CB	1.92 m (6 ft 4 in)	95 kg (209 lb)	19 August 1981	(Hungary) Bp. Honvéd
9	Dániel Varga	D	2.01 m (6 ft 7 in)	96 kg (212 lb)	24 September 1983	(Hungary) Ferencváros
10	Dénes Varga (c)	D	1.93 m (6 ft 4 in)	97 kg (214 lb)	29 March 1987	(Hungary) Szolnoki Dózsa
11	Gábor Kis	CF	1.94 m (6 ft 4 in)	110 kg (243 lb)	27 September 1982	(Hungary) Szolnoki Dózsa
12	Balázs Hárai	CF	2.02 m (6 ft 8 in)	110 kg (243 lb)	5 April 1987	(Hungary) Eger
13	Attila Decker	GK	1.97 m (6 ft 6 in)	78 kg (172 lb)	25 August 1987	(Hungary) Bp. Honvéd

=== Japan ===
The following is the Japanese roster in the men's water polo tournament of the 2016 Summer Olympics.

Head coach: Yoji Omoto

№	Name	Pos.	Height	Weight	Date of birth	2016 club
1	Katsuyuki Tanamura	GK	1.84 m (6 ft 0 in)	84 kg (185 lb)	3 August 1989	(Japan) Bourbon WP Club
2	Seiya Adachi	D	1.72 m (5 ft 8 in)	67 kg (148 lb)	24 June 1995	(Japan) Nippon Sport
3	Atsushi Arai	D	1.68 m (5 ft 6 in)	62 kg (137 lb)	3 February 1994	(Japan) Nippon Sport
4	Mitsuaki Shiga	D	1.77 m (5 ft 10 in)	75 kg (165 lb)	16 September 1991	(Japan) All-Nittaidai
5	Akira Yanase	CF	1.90 m (6 ft 3 in)	95 kg (209 lb)	11 August 1988	(Japan) All-Nittaidai
6	Atsuto Iida	CB	1.81 m (5 ft 11 in)	82 kg (181 lb)	24 December 1993	(Japan) Nippon Sport
7	Yusuke Shimizu (c)	CF	1.81 m (5 ft 11 in)	85 kg (187 lb)	7 September 1988	(Japan) Bourbon WP Club
8	Yuki Kadono	D	1.77 m (5 ft 10 in)	72 kg (159 lb)	14 September 1990	(Japan) All-Nittaidai
9	Koji Takei	D	1.76 m (5 ft 9 in)	78 kg (172 lb)	30 July 1990	(Japan) All-Nittaidai
10	Kenya Yasuda	CB	1.82 m (6 ft 0 in)	77 kg (170 lb)	29 March 1989	(Japan) Bourbon WP Club
11	Keigo Okawa	CB	1.83 m (6 ft 0 in)	96 kg (212 lb)	11 March 1990	(Japan) All-Nittaidai
12	Shota Hazui	D	1.77 m (5 ft 10 in)	77 kg (170 lb)	30 September 1986	(Japan) Bourbon WP Club
13	Tomoyoshi Fukushima	GK	1.77 m (5 ft 10 in)	75 kg (165 lb)	3 June 1993	(Japan) Nippon Sport

=== Serbia ===
The following is the Serbian roster in the men's water polo tournament of the 2016 Summer Olympics.

Head coach: Dejan Savić

SRB – Serbia (as of 5 August 2016)
No.	Player	Pos.	L/R	Height	Weight	Date of birth (age)	Apps	Club
1	Gojko Pijetlović	GK	B	1.94 m (6 ft 4 in)	92 kg (203 lb)	7 August 1983 (aged 32)	198	(Romania) CSM Digi Oradea
2	Dušan Mandić	D	L	2.02 m (6 ft 8 in)	105 kg (231 lb)	16 June 1994 (aged 22)	111	(Italy) Pro Recco
3	Živko Gocić (C)	CB	R	1.93 m (6 ft 4 in)	93 kg (205 lb)	22 August 1982 (aged 33)	353	(Hungary) Szolnoki Vízilabda SC
4	Sava Ranđelović	CB	R	1.93 m (6 ft 4 in)	98 kg (216 lb)	17 July 1993 (aged 23)	82	(Italy) AN Brescia
5	Miloš Ćuk	D	R	1.91 m (6 ft 3 in)	91 kg (201 lb)	21 December 1990 (aged 25)	124	(Hungary) Egri VK
6	Duško Pijetlović	CF	R	1.97 m (6 ft 6 in)	97 kg (214 lb)	25 April 1985 (aged 31)	261	(Italy) Pro Recco
7	Slobodan Nikić	CF	R	1.97 m (6 ft 6 in)	106 kg (234 lb)	25 January 1983 (aged 33)	346	(Turkey) Galatasaray S.K.
8	Milan Aleksić	CB	R	1.93 m (6 ft 4 in)	96 kg (212 lb)	13 May 1986 (aged 30)	202	(Hungary) Szolnoki Vízilabda SC
9	Nikola Jakšić	CB	R	1.97 m (6 ft 6 in)	89 kg (196 lb)	17 January 1997 (aged 19)	48	(Serbia) VK Partizan
10	Filip Filipović	D	L	1.96 m (6 ft 5 in)	101 kg (223 lb)	2 May 1987 (aged 29)	297	(Italy) Pro Recco
11	Andrija Prlainović	D	R	1.87 m (6 ft 2 in)	93 kg (205 lb)	28 April 1987 (aged 29)	271	(Hungary) Szolnoki Vízilabda SC
12	Stefan Mitrović	D	R	1.95 m (6 ft 5 in)	91 kg (201 lb)	29 March 1988 (aged 28)	198	(Hungary) Szolnoki Vízilabda SC
13	Branislav Mitrović	GK	B	2.01 m (6 ft 7 in)	100 kg (220 lb)	30 January 1985 (aged 31)	119	(Hungary) Egri VK
Average				1.95 m (6 ft 5 in)	96 kg (212 lb)	28 years, 205 days	201	

== Pool B ==
=== Croatia ===
The following is the Croatian roster in the men's water polo tournament of the 2016 Summer Olympics.

Head coach: Ivica Tucak

№	Name	Pos.	Height	Weight	Date of birth	2016 club
1	Josip Pavić (c)	GK	1.95 m (6 ft 5 in)	90 kg (198 lb)	15 January 1982	(Greece) Olympiacos
2	Damir Burić	CB	2.05 m (6 ft 9 in)	115 kg (254 lb)	2 December 1980	(Croatia) Primorje Rijeka
3	Antonio Petković	D	1.90 m (6 ft 3 in)	90 kg (198 lb)	11 January 1986	(Italy) Sport Management
4	Luka Lončar	CF	1.95 m (6 ft 5 in)	106 kg (234 lb)	26 June 1987	(Croatia) HAVK Mladost
5	Maro Joković	D	2.03 m (6 ft 8 in)	95 kg (209 lb)	1 October 1987	(Croatia) Jug Dubrovnik
6	Luka Bukić	D	1.95 m (6 ft 5 in)	90 kg (198 lb)	30 April 1994	(Croatia) HAVK Mladost
7	Xavier García	CF	1.98 m (6 ft 6 in)	92 kg (203 lb)	5 January 1984	(Croatia) Primorje Rijeka
8	Andro Bušlje	CB	2.00 m (6 ft 7 in)	115 kg (254 lb)	4 January 1986	(Italy) Posillipo
9	Sandro Sukno	CF	2.00 m (6 ft 7 in)	93 kg (205 lb)	30 June 1990	(Italy) Pro Recco
10	Ivan Krapić	CF	1.94 m (6 ft 4 in)	103 kg (227 lb)	14 February 1989	(Croatia) Primorje Rijeka
11	Anđelo Šetka	D	1.86 m (6 ft 1 in)	87 kg (192 lb)	14 September 1985	(Croatia) Primorje Rijeka
12	Marko Macan	CB	1.96 m (6 ft 5 in)	109 kg (240 lb)	26 April 1993	(Croatia) Jug Dubrovnik
13	Marko Bijač	GK	2.01 m (6 ft 7 in)	85 kg (187 lb)	12 January 1991	(Croatia) Jug Dubrovnik

=== France ===
The following is the French roster in the men's water polo tournament of the 2016 Summer Olympics.

Head coach: Florian Bruzzo

№	Name	Pos.	Height	Weight	Date of birth	2016 club
1	Rémi Garsau	GK	1.90 m (6 ft 3 in)	82 kg (181 lb)	19 July 1984	(France) CN Marseille
2	Rémi Saudadier	CF	1.98 m (6 ft 6 in)	95 kg (209 lb)	20 March 1986	(Germany) Spandau 04
3	Igor Kovacevic	CB	1.90 m (6 ft 3 in)	88 kg (194 lb)	3 November 1988	(France) CN Marseille
4	Enzo Khasz	CF	2.03 m (6 ft 8 in)	105 kg (231 lb)	13 August 1993	(France) CN Marseille
5	Romain Blary	CF	1.95 m (6 ft 5 in)	103 kg (227 lb)	20 October 1985	(France) Team Strasbourg
6	Thibaut Simon	D	1.92 m (6 ft 4 in)	98 kg (216 lb)	18 December 1983	(France) CN Marseille
7	Ugo Crousillat	D	1.90 m (6 ft 3 in)	94 kg (207 lb)	27 October 1990	(Hungary) Szolnoki Dózsa
8	Michal Iždinský	D	1.78 m (5 ft 10 in)	75 kg (165 lb)	23 July 1992	(France) Olympic Nice
9	Mehdi Marzouki	D	1.92 m (6 ft 4 in)	103 kg (227 lb)	26 May 1987	(Germany) Spandau 04
10	Mathieu Peisson	CB	1.85 m (6 ft 1 in)	105 kg (231 lb)	29 September 1982	(France) Team Strasbourg
11	Petar Tomašević	D	1.92 m (6 ft 4 in)	102 kg (225 lb)	2 January 1989	(France) Olympic Nice
12	Alexandre Camarasa (c)	CF	1.93 m (6 ft 4 in)	104 kg (229 lb)	10 June 1987	(France) CN Marseille
13	Jonathan Moriamé	GK	2.03 m (6 ft 8 in)	104 kg (229 lb)	19 June 1984	(France) CN Noisy

=== Italy ===
The following is the Italian roster in the men's water polo tournament of the 2016 Summer Olympics.

Head coach: Alessandro Campagna

№	Name	Pos.	Height	Weight	Date of birth	2016 club
1	Stefano Tempesti (c)	GK	2.05 m (6 ft 9 in)	100 kg (220 lb)	9 June 1979	(Italy) Pro Recco
2	Francesco Di Fulvio	D	1.90 m (6 ft 3 in)	88 kg (194 lb)	15 August 1993	(Italy) Pro Recco
3	Niccolò Gitto	CB	1.90 m (6 ft 3 in)	90 kg (198 lb)	12 October 1986	(Italy) Pro Recco
4	Pietro Figlioli	D	1.91 m (6 ft 3 in)	98 kg (216 lb)	29 May 1984	(Italy) Pro Recco
5	Alessandro Velotto	CB	1.86 m (6 ft 1 in)	85 kg (187 lb)	21 February 1995	(Italy) Canottieri Napoli
6	Michaël Bodegas	CF	1.92 m (6 ft 4 in)	102 kg (225 lb)	3 May 1987	(Italy) Pro Recco
7	Andrea Fondelli	D	1.90 m (6 ft 3 in)	96 kg (212 lb)	27 February 1994	(Italy) Pro Recco
8	Valentino Gallo	D	1.92 m (6 ft 4 in)	95 kg (209 lb)	17 July 1985	(Italy) Posillipo
9	Christian Presciutti	D	1.84 m (6 ft 0 in)	87 kg (192 lb)	27 November 1982	(Italy) Pro Recco
10	Nicholas Presciutti	CB	1.89 m (6 ft 2 in)	93 kg (205 lb)	14 December 1993	(Italy) Pro Recco
11	Matteo Aicardi	CF	1.92 m (6 ft 4 in)	102 kg (225 lb)	19 April 1986	(Italy) Pro Recco
12	Alessandro Nora	D	1.91 m (6 ft 3 in)	85 kg (187 lb)	24 May 1987	(Italy) AN Brescia
13	Marco Del Lungo	GK	1.90 m (6 ft 3 in)	97 kg (214 lb)	1 March 1990	(Italy) AN Brescia

=== Montenegro ===
The following is the Montenegrin roster in the men's water polo tournament of the 2016 Summer Olympics.

Head coach: Vladimir Gojković

№	Name	Pos.	Height	Weight	Date of birth	2016 club
1	Zdravko Radić	GK	1.93 m (6 ft 4 in)	96 kg (212 lb)	24 June 1979	(Italy) Lazio
2	Draško Brguljan	D	1.94 m (6 ft 4 in)	92 kg (203 lb)	27 December 1984	(Hungary) Orvosegyetem
3	Vjekoslav Pasković	D	1.80 m (5 ft 11 in)	86 kg (190 lb)	23 March 1985	(Turkey) Galatasaray
4	Antonio Petrović	CF	1.93 m (6 ft 4 in)	98 kg (216 lb)	24 September 1982	(Croatia) Primorje Rijeka
5	Darko Brguljan	CB	1.80 m (5 ft 11 in)	97 kg (214 lb)	5 November 1990	(Italy) Canottieri Napoli
6	Aleksandar Radović	D	1.91 m (6 ft 3 in)	98 kg (216 lb)	24 February 1987	(Germany) Waspo Hannover
7	Mlađan Janović	D	1.80 m (5 ft 11 in)	97 kg (214 lb)	11 June 1984	(Turkey) Galatasaray
8	Uroš Čučković	D	1.99 m (6 ft 6 in)	101 kg (223 lb)	25 April 1990	(Hungary) Eger
9	Aleksandar Ivović	CB	1.97 m (6 ft 6 in)	107 kg (236 lb)	24 February 1986	(Italy) Pro Recco
10	Saša Mišić	CF	1.98 m (6 ft 6 in)	109 kg (240 lb)	27 March 1987	(Russia) Kinef Kirishi
11	Filip Klikovac	CF	1.90 m (6 ft 3 in)	118 kg (260 lb)	7 February 1989	(Italy) Posillipo
12	Predrag Jokić (c)	CB	1.88 m (6 ft 2 in)	102 kg (225 lb)	3 February 1983	(Germany) Waspo Hannover
13	Miloš Šćepanović	GK	1.85 m (6 ft 1 in)	86 kg (190 lb)	9 October 1982	(Turkey) Galatasaray

=== Spain ===
The following is the Spanish roster in the men's water polo tournament of the 2016 Summer Olympics.

Head coach: Gabriel Hernández

№	Name	Pos.	Height	Weight	Date of birth	2016 club
1	Iñaki Aguilar	GK	1.89 m (6 ft 2 in)	82 kg (181 lb)	9 September 1983	(Spain) Terrassa
2	Alberto Munarriz	CF	1.97 m (6 ft 6 in)	105 kg (231 lb)	19 May 1994	(Spain) Barceloneta
3	Marc Roca	CF	1.88 m (6 ft 2 in)	94 kg (207 lb)	21 January 1988	(Spain) Barceloneta
4	Ricard Alarcón	D	1.86 m (6 ft 1 in)	90 kg (198 lb)	18 August 1991	(Spain) Terrassa
5	Guillermo Molina (c)	D	1.94 m (6 ft 4 in)	105 kg (231 lb)	16 March 1984	(Italy) AN Brescia
6	Marc Minguell	D	1.86 m (6 ft 1 in)	93 kg (205 lb)	14 January 1985	(Spain) Barceloneta
7	Balázs Szirányi	CF	1.96 m (6 ft 5 in)	108 kg (238 lb)	10 January 1983	(Spain) Barceloneta
8	Albert Español	CF	1.89 m (6 ft 2 in)	86 kg (190 lb)	29 October 1985	(Spain) Barceloneta
9	Roger Tahull	CF	1.95 m (6 ft 5 in)	104 kg (229 lb)	11 May 1997	(Spain) Barceloneta
10	Francisco Fernández	CB	1.85 m (6 ft 1 in)	84 kg (185 lb)	21 June 1986	(Spain) Barceloneta
11	Blai Mallarach	CB	1.87 m (6 ft 2 in)	87 kg (192 lb)	21 August 1987	(Greece) Olympiacos
12	Gonzalo Echenique	CB	1.94 m (6 ft 4 in)	96 kg (212 lb)	27 April 1990	(Croatia) Primorje Rijeka
13	Daniel López	GK	1.91 m (6 ft 3 in)	91 kg (201 lb)	16 July 1980	(Spain) Barceloneta

=== United States ===
The following is the American roster in the men's water polo tournament of the 2016 Summer Olympics.

Head coach: (Serbia) Dejan Udovičić

№	Name	Pos.	Height	Weight	Date of birth	2016 club
1	Merrill Moses	GK	1.91 m (6 ft 3 in)	93 kg (205 lb)	13 August 1977	(United States) New York Athletic Club
2	Thomas Dunstan	D	1.92 m (6 ft 4 in)	91 kg (201 lb)	29 September 1997	(United States) Regency WP Club
3	Ben Hallock	CF	1.96 m (6 ft 5 in)	95 kg (209 lb)	22 November 1997	(United States) Los Angeles WP Club
4	Alex Obert	CB	1.98 m (6 ft 6 in)	102 kg (225 lb)	18 December 1991	(United States) New York Athletic Club
5	Alex Roelse	CB	2.00 m (6 ft 7 in)	104 kg (229 lb)	10 January 1995	(United States) UCLA Bruins
6	Luca Cupido	D	1.93 m (6 ft 4 in)	95 kg (209 lb)	9 November 1995	(United States) Newport WP Foundation
7	Josh Samuels	D	1.93 m (6 ft 4 in)	93 kg (205 lb)	8 July 1991	(United States) New York Athletic Club
8	Tony Azevedo (c)	D	1.85 m (6 ft 1 in)	89 kg (196 lb)	21 November 1981	(United States) New York Athletic Club
9	Alex Bowen	D	1.96 m (6 ft 5 in)	100 kg (220 lb)	14 September 1993	(United States) New York Athletic Club
10	Bret Bonanni	D	1.93 m (6 ft 4 in)	93 kg (205 lb)	20 January 1994	(United States) New York Athletic Club
11	Jesse Smith	CB	1.93 m (6 ft 4 in)	109 kg (240 lb)	27 April 1983	(United States) New York Athletic Club
12	John Mann	CF	1.98 m (6 ft 6 in)	113 kg (249 lb)	27 June 1985	(United States) New York Athletic Club
13	McQuin Baron	GK	2.03 m (6 ft 8 in)	104 kg (229 lb)	27 October 1995	(United States) Regency WP Club

== Statistics ==
=== Player representation by club ===
Clubs with 6 or more players represented are listed.

Club	Players
(Italy) Pro Recco	14
(Greece) Olympiacos	13
(Spain) Barceloneta	8
(United States) New York Athletic Club	8
(Hungary) Szolnoki Dózsa	8
(Hungary) Eger	7
(Brazil) Botafogo	6
(Croatia) Primorje Rijeka	6

=== Player representation by league ===
The Brazilian, Greek, Japanese, Italian, Hungarian and American squads were made up entirely of players from the respective countries' domestic leagues. The Montenegrin squad was made up entirely of players employed by abroad country clubs.

Country	Players	Percentage	Outside national squad
Total	156		
Italy	25	16%	12
Hungary	23	15%	10
Greece	15	10%	2
Brazil	13	8%	0
Japan	13	8%	0
United States	13	8%	0
Australia	12	8%	0
Croatia	11	7%	0
France	11	7%	0
Spain	10	6%	0
Others	10	6%	

=== Coaches representation by country ===
Coaches in bold represent their own country.

Nº	Country	Coaches
3	Croatia	Elvis Fatović (Australia), Ratko Rudić (Brazil), **Ivica Tucak**
2	Serbia	**Dejan Savić**, Dejan Udovičić (United States)
1	France	**Florian Bruzzo**
1	Greece	**Thodoris Vlachos**
1	Hungary	**Tibor Benedek**
1	Italy	**Alessandro Campagna**
1	Japan	**Yoji Omoto**
1	Montenegro	**Vladimir Gojković**
1	Spain	**Gabriel Hernández**

== See also ==
- Water polo at the 2016 Summer Olympics – Women's team rosters
