= Kseniia Krimer =

Russian water polo player

Personal information
- Nationality: Russian
- Born: 19 July 1992 (age 34)
- Height: 187 cm (74 in)
- Weight: 89 kg (196 lb)

Sport
- Sport: Water polo
- Number: 6
National team
- Years: Team
- 2016: Russia

Ksenia Krimer (born 19 July 1992) is a Russian female water polo player. She is part of the Russia women's national water polo team. She has competed in a number of international tournaments, including the 2016 Women's European Water Polo Championship.
