= Daria Ryzhkova =

Russian water polo player

Personal information
- Nationality: Russia
- Born: February 8, 1995 (age 31)

Sport
- Country: Russia
- Sport: Water polo
Medal record
World Championships
Bronze medal – third place	2017 Budapest	Team

Daria Ryzhkova (8 February 1995) is a Russian water polo player.

She competed for the Russian national team at the 2014 Women's European Water Polo Championship, and 2017 World Aquatics Championships

== See also ==
- List of World Aquatics Championships medalists in water polo
