= Országos Bajnokság I (women's water polo) =

Women's water polo championship in Hungary

- Founded: 1984
- Country: Hungary
- Confederation: MUSz
- Number of clubs: 10
- Domestic cup(s): Hungarian Cup
- International cup(s): LEN Champions Cup
- Current champions: UVSE (2018-19)
- Most championships: Szentesi (11)

The Women's Water Polo First League (Női Országos Bajnokság I) is the premier Hungarian championship for women's water polo clubs. First held in 1984, it is currently contested by ten teams. The champion takes part in the Champions' Cup.

== 2017-18 teams ==
- BVSC Budapest
- Dunaújvárosi Egyetem
- Eger
- Ferencváros
- Honvéd
- Szeged
- Szentes
- Tatabánya
- UVSE
- UVSE Margitsziget

== Previous winners ==
- 1984 : Vasas
- 1985 : Vasas (2)
- 1985/86 : BVSC
- 1986/87 : Szentes
- 1987/88 : BVSC (2)
- 1988/89 : BVSC (3)
- 1989/90 : Szentes (2)
- 1990/91 : BVSC (4)
- 1991/92 : Szentes (3)
- 1992/93 : BVSC (5)
- 1993/94 : Szentes (4)
- 1994/95 : Szentes (5)
- 1995/96 : Szentes (6)
- 1996/97 : Szentes (7)
- 1997/98 : Szentes (8)
- 1998/99 : Szentes (9)
- 1999/00 : Szentes (10)
- 2000/01 : Dunaújváros
- 2001/02 : Dunaújváros (2)
- 2002/03 : Dunaújváros (3)
- 2003/04 : Dunaújváros (4)
- 2004/05 : Dunaújváros (5)
- 2005/06 : Honvéd
- 2006/07 : Honvéd (2)
- 2007/08 : Honvéd (3)
- 2008/09 : Dunaújváros (6)
- 2009/10 : Dunaújváros (7)
- 2010/11 : Dunaújváros (8)
- 2011/12 : Eger
- 2012/13 : Eger (2)
- 2013/14 : Szentes (11)
- 2014/15 : UVSE
- 2015/16 : UVSE (2)
- 2016/17 : UVSE (3)
- 2017/18 : UVSE (4)
- 2018/19 : UVSE (5)
- 2018/20 :
- 2018/21 :

== Performances ==
=== Performance by club ===
The teams in Bold play in the 2018-19 season of OB I.

Club	Winners	Runners-up	Third place	Winning years
**Szentesi VK**	**11**	10	7	1987, 1990, 1992, 1994, 1995, 1996, 1997, 1998, 1999, 2000, 2014
**Dunaújvárosi Főikola VE**	**8**	5	5	2001, 2002, 2003, 2004, 2005, 2009, 2010, 2011
**Budapesti VSC**	**5**	12	7	1986, 1988, 1989, 1991, 1993
**UVSE**	**5**	-	-	2015, 2016, 2017, 2018, 2019
**Budapesti Honvéd SE**	**3**	1	1	2006, 2007, 2008
Vasas SC	**2**	3	7	1984, 1985
**Egri VK**	**2**	-	4	2012, 2013
Orvosegyetem SC	-	2	3	-
Budapesti EAC	-	2	1	-

=== Performance by counties ===
The following table lists the Hungarian water polo champions by counties of Hungary.

County (megye)	Titles	Winning clubs
Budapest	15	**BVSC** (5); Budapesti Honvéd SE (3); **UVSE** (5); Vasas (2)
Csongrád	11	**Szentes** (11)
Fejér	8	**Dunaújváros** (8)
Heves	2	**Eger** (2)

- The bolded teams are currently playing in the 2017-18 season of the Hungarian League.
