= UVSE =

- Founded: 2008
- League: OB I (M) / OB I (W)
- Based in: Budapest, Hungary
- Arena: Alfréd Hajós National Swimming Stadium
- Colors
- President: Lovas Péter
- Website: uvse.hu

UVSE (full name UVSE Water Polo Sports Association) is a professional water polo club from Budapest, Hungary, founded in 2008. It was split off from Újpesti TE, which afterwards folded. They have teams in the men's and women's Hungarian First Division. The women have won the 2014–15 and the 2015–16 competition.

UVSE's request to use the name "Ujpesti Vizilabda (water polo)" to Ujpesti TE sports society was denied.

== Honours (women's team) ==
- Euroleague
  - Runner up (1): 2016
- LEN Trophy
  - Champion (2): 2017, 2023
  - Runner up (1): 2019
- Hungarian Nationwide Championship (5)
  - 2015, 2016, 2017, 2018, 2019
- Hungarian Cup (5)
  - 2014, 2015, 2016, 2017, 2018
