= Dunaújvárosi FVE =

Hungarian water polo

- Founded: 1989
- League: (Hungary) Női OB I
- Based in: Dunaújváros
- Colors
- Championships: 8 Hungarian leagues 4 Hungarian cups
- Website: http://portal.duf.hu/main.php?folderID=1425

Dunaújvárosi Főiskola Vizílabda Egyesület is a Hungarian water polo club from Dunaújváros founded in 1989 in the Dunaújváros College. It is best known for its women's team, which has won eight national championships since 2001. It reached the final of the 2001 Cup Winners' Cup, the 2003 Champions Cup and the 2009 LEN Trophy, but it lost them to SKIF Moscow, Glyfada NSC and Shturm Chekhov respectively. In 2018 Dunaújváros reached the final of the LEN Trophy and finally won their first international title.

== Titles ==
- Hungarian Nationwide Championship (8)
  - 2001, 2002, 2003, 2004, 2005, 2009, 2010, 2011
- Hungarian Cup (4)
  - 2001, 2002, 2003, 2004
- LEN Trophy (1)
  - 2018
- Danube League (1)
  - 2021
