= Water polo at the 2012 Summer Olympics – Women's team rosters =

These are the rosters of all participating teams at the women's water polo tournament at the 2012 Summer Olympics in London.

Abbreviations
Pos.	Position	№	Cap number
CF	Centre forward	CB	Centre back
D	Defense	GK	Goalkeeper

== Pool A ==
=== China ===
The following is the Chinese roster in the women's water polo tournament of the 2012 Summer Olympics.

№	Name	Pos.	Height	Weight	Date of birth	2012 club
1	Yang Jun	GK	1.80 m (5 ft 11 in)	69 kg (152 lb)	28 April 1988	
2	Teng Fei	D	1.69 m (5 ft 7 in)	65 kg (143 lb)	23 January 1988	
3	Liu Ping	CB	1.73 m (5 ft 8 in)	67 kg (148 lb)	1 May 1987	
4	Sun Yujun	D	1.68 m (5 ft 6 in)	65 kg (143 lb)	30 January 1987	
5	He Jin	CF	1.78 m (5 ft 10 in)	100 kg (220 lb)	3 May 1987	
6	Sun Yating	CF	1.80 m (5 ft 11 in)	80 kg (176 lb)	24 February 1988	
7	Song Donglun	D	1.78 m (5 ft 10 in)	82 kg (181 lb)	28 April 1991	
8	Gao Ao	D	1.73 m (5 ft 8 in)	75 kg (165 lb)	26 July 1990	
9	Wang Yi	D	1.78 m (5 ft 10 in)	69 kg (152 lb)	29 July 1987	
10	Ma Huanhuan	D	1.77 m (5 ft 10 in)	69 kg (152 lb)	13 January 1990	
11	Sun Huizi	D	1.82 m (6 ft 0 in)	69 kg (152 lb)	11 June 1990	
12	Zhang Lei	D	1.71 m (5 ft 7 in)	65 kg (143 lb)	9 May 1988	
13	Wang Ying	GK	1.85 m (6 ft 1 in)	76 kg (168 lb)	7 August 1988	

Head coach: Juan Jané

=== Hungary ===
The following is the Hungarian roster in the women's water polo tournament of the 2012 Summer Olympics.

№	Name	Pos.	Height	Weight	Date of birth	2012 club
1	Flóra Bolonyai	GK	1.79 m (5 ft 10 in)	69 kg (152 lb)	5 April 1991	(United States) USC Trojans
2	Dóra Czigány	CF	1.70 m (5 ft 7 in)	62 kg (137 lb)	23 October 1992	(Hungary) ZF-Eger
3	Dóra Antal	CF	1.68 m (5 ft 6 in)	60 kg (132 lb)	9 September 1993	(Hungary) ZF-Eger
4	Hanna Kisteleki	CF	1.73 m (5 ft 8 in)	67 kg (148 lb)	10 March 1991	(Hungary) BVSC ‐ Zugló
5	Gabriella Szűcs	CF	1.83 m (6 ft 0 in)	74 kg (163 lb)	7 March 1988	(Hungary) Dunaújvárosi Főiskola VE
6	Orsolya Takács	CB	1.90 m (6 ft 3 in)	83 kg (183 lb)	20 May 1985	(Hungary) Szentesi Vizilabda Klub
7	Rita Drávucz	D	1.80 m (5 ft 11 in)	68 kg (150 lb)	14 April 1980	(Italy) Pro Recco
8	Rita Keszthelyi	D	1.77 m (5 ft 10 in)	67 kg (148 lb)	10 December 1991	(Hungary) Szentesi Vizilabda Klub
9	Ildikó Tóth	CB	1.75 m (5 ft 9 in)	70 kg (154 lb)	23 April 1987	(Hungary) BVSC ‐ Zugló
10	Barbara Bujka	CB	1.74 m (5 ft 9 in)	84 kg (185 lb)	5 September 1986	(Italy) Waterpolo Fontalba Messina
11	Dóra Csabai	CB	1.75 m (5 ft 9 in)	62 kg (137 lb)	20 April 1989	(Hungary) BVSC ‐ Zugló
12	Katalin Menczinger	CB	1.78 m (5 ft 10 in)	69 kg (152 lb)	17 January 1989	(Hungary) Dunaújvárosi Főiskola VE
13	Edina Gangl	GK	1.81 m (5 ft 11 in)	67 kg (148 lb)	25 June 1990	(Hungary) ZF-Eger

Head coach: András Merész

=== Spain ===
The following is the Spanish roster in the women's water polo tournament of the 2012 Summer Olympics.

№	Name	Pos.	Height	Weight	Date of birth	2012 club
1	Laura Ester	GK	1.70 m (5 ft 7 in)	56 kg (123 lb)	22 January 1990	(Spain) CN Sabadell
2	Marta Bach	CB	1.76 m (5 ft 9 in)	66 kg (146 lb)	17 February 1993	(Spain) CN Mataro
3	Anna Espar	D	1.80 m (5 ft 11 in)	66 kg (146 lb)	8 January 1993	(Spain) CN Sabadell
4	Roser Tarragó	D	1.70 m (5 ft 7 in)	59 kg (130 lb)	25 March 1993	(Spain) CN Mataro
5	Matilde Ortiz	CB	1.74 m (5 ft 9 in)	64 kg (141 lb)	16 September 1990	(Spain) CN Sabadell
6	Jennifer Pareja	D	1.74 m (5 ft 9 in)	63 kg (139 lb)	8 May 1984	(Spain) CN Sabadell
7	Lorena Miranda	CB	1.74 m (5 ft 9 in)	73 kg (161 lb)	7 April 1991	(Spain) CW Dos Hermanas
8	Pilar Peña Carrasco	D	1.72 m (5 ft 8 in)	61 kg (134 lb)	4 April 1986	(Spain) CN Sabadell
9	Andrea Blas	CF	1.73 m (5 ft 8 in)	81 kg (179 lb)	14 February 1992	(Spain) EW Zaragoza
10	Ona Meseguer	D	1.67 m (5 ft 6 in)	62 kg (137 lb)	1 March 1978	(Spain) CN Sant Andreu
11	Maica García Godoy	CF	1.88 m (6 ft 2 in)	90 kg (198 lb)	17 October 1990	(Spain) CN Sabadell
12	Laura López	D	1.70 m (5 ft 7 in)	63 kg (139 lb)	13 January 1988	(Spain) CN Madrid Moscardo
13	Ana Copado	GK	1.80 m (5 ft 11 in)	70 kg (154 lb)	31 March 1980	(Spain) CN Sant Andreu

Head coach: Miki Oca

=== United States ===
The following is the American roster in the women's water polo tournament of the 2012 Summer Olympics.

№	Name	Pos.	Height	Weight	Date of birth	2012 club
1	Elizabeth Armstrong	GK	1.88 m (6 ft 2 in)	77 kg (170 lb)	31 January 1983	(United States) Great Lakes WP Club
2	Heather Petri	D	1.80 m (5 ft 11 in)	73 kg (161 lb)	13 June 1978	(United States) New York Athletic Club
3	Melissa Seidemann	CB	1.83 m (6 ft 0 in)	104 kg (229 lb)	26 June 1990	(United States) Stanford University
4	Brenda Villa	D	1.63 m (5 ft 4 in)	79 kg (174 lb)	18 April 1980	(Italy) Orizzonte Catania
5	Lauren Wenger	D	1.91 m (6 ft 3 in)	77 kg (170 lb)	11 March 1984	(United States) New York Athletic Club
6	Maggie Steffens	CB	1.75 m (5 ft 9 in)	70 kg (154 lb)	4 June 1993	(United States) Diablo Water Polo
7	Courtney Mathewson	D	1.70 m (5 ft 7 in)	71 kg (157 lb)	14 September 1986	(United States) New York Athletic Club
8	Jessica Steffens	CB	1.83 m (6 ft 0 in)	75 kg (165 lb)	7 April 1987	(United States) New York Athletic Club
9	Elsie Windes	CB	1.78 m (5 ft 10 in)	70 kg (154 lb)	17 June 1985	(United States) Tualatin Hills WPC
10	Kelly Rulon	D	1.78 m (5 ft 10 in)	61 kg (134 lb)	16 August 1984	(Italy) ASD Roma
11	Annika Dries	CF	1.85 m (6 ft 1 in)	88 kg (194 lb)	10 April 1992	(United States) Stanford University
12	Kami Craig	CF	1.80 m (5 ft 11 in)	88 kg (194 lb)	21 July 1987	(United States) Santa Barbara WP Foundation
13	Tumua Anae	GK	1.80 m (5 ft 11 in)	70 kg (154 lb)	16 October 1988	(United States) SoCal

Head coach: Adam Krikorian

== Pool B ==
=== Australia ===
On 12 June 2012, the Australian roster for the women's water polo tournament was announced.

№	Name	Pos.	Height	Weight	Date of birth	2012 club
1	Victoria Brown	GK	1.83 m (6 ft 0 in)	76 kg (168 lb)	27 July 1985	(Australia) Victorian Tigers
2	Gemma Beadsworth	CF	1.80 m (5 ft 11 in)	79 kg (174 lb)	17 July 1987	(Australia) Fremantle Marlins
3	Sophie Smith	CB	1.81 m (5 ft 11 in)	68 kg (150 lb)	26 February 1986	(Australia) Queensland Breakers
4	Holly Lincoln-Smith	CF	1.83 m (6 ft 0 in)	82 kg (181 lb)	26 March 1988	(Australia) Cronulla Sharks
5	Jane Moran	D	1.67 m (5 ft 6 in)	70 kg (154 lb)	6 June 1985	(Australia) Brisbane Barracudas
6	Bronwen Knox	CF	1.82 m (6 ft 0 in)	88 kg (194 lb)	16 April 1986	(Australia) Victorian Tigers
7	Rowena Webster	CB	1.78 m (5 ft 10 in)	80 kg (176 lb)	27 December 1987	(Australia) Victorian Tigers
8	Kate Gynther	D	1.75 m (5 ft 9 in)	73 kg (161 lb)	5 July 1982	(Australia) Brisbane Barracudas
9	Glencora Ralph	CB	1.78 m (5 ft 10 in)	67 kg (148 lb)	8 August 1988	(Australia) Fremantle Marlins
10	Ashleigh Southern	CF	1.88 m (6 ft 2 in)	94 kg (207 lb)	22 October 1992	(Australia) Brisbane Barracudas
11	Melissa Rippon	D	1.69 m (5 ft 7 in)	70 kg (154 lb)	20 January 1981	(Australia) Brisbane Barracudas
12	Nicola Zagame	D	1.74 m (5 ft 9 in)	72 kg (159 lb)	11 August 1990	(Australia) Cronulla Sharks
13	Alicia McCormack	GK	1.68 m (5 ft 6 in)	72 kg (159 lb)	7 June 1983	(Australia) Cronulla Sharks

Head coach: Greg McFadden

=== Great Britain ===
The following is the British roster in the women's water polo tournament of the 2012 Summer Olympics..

№	Name	Pos.	Height	Weight	Date of birth	2012 club
1	Robyn Nicholls	GK	1.78 m (5 ft 10 in)	65 kg (143 lb)	8 May 1990	(United Kingdom) City of Manchester
2	Chloe Wilcox	D	1.72 m (5 ft 8 in)	62 kg (137 lb)	20 December 1986	(United Kingdom) City of Manchester
3	Fiona McCann	CB	1.72 m (5 ft 8 in)	70 kg (154 lb)	13 May 1987	(United Kingdom) City of Liverpool
4	Francesca Snell	CB	1.75 m (5 ft 9 in)	63 kg (139 lb)	28 March 1987	(United Kingdom) West London Penguin
5	Alexandra Rutlidge	CB	1.70 m (5 ft 7 in)	62 kg (137 lb)	12 November 1988	(United Kingdom) City of Manchester
6	Frances Leighton	CF	1.82 m (6 ft 0 in)	72 kg (159 lb)	30 March 1982	(United Kingdom) City of Sheffield
7	Lisa Gibson	CF	1.77 m (5 ft 10 in)	75 kg (165 lb)	12 August 1989	(United Kingdom) City of Manchester
8	Hazel Musgrove	CB	1.70 m (5 ft 7 in)	65 kg (143 lb)	6 February 1989	(United Kingdom) City of Liverpool
9	Ciara Gibson-Byrne	D	1.67 m (5 ft 6 in)	59 kg (130 lb)	3 December 1992	(United Kingdom) City of Manchester
10	Angela Winstanley-Smith	CF	1.79 m (5 ft 10 in)	66 kg (146 lb)	5 August 1985	(United Kingdom) City of Manchester
11	Francesca Clayton	D	1.70 m (5 ft 7 in)	69 kg (152 lb)	7 January 1990	(United Kingdom) City of Liverpool
12	Rebecca Kershaw	D	1.75 m (5 ft 9 in)	59 kg (130 lb)	11 August 1990	(United Kingdom) City of Manchester
13	Rosemary Morris	GK	1.80 m (5 ft 11 in)	69 kg (152 lb)	31 January 1986	(United Kingdom) City of Liverpool

Head coach: Szilveszter Fekete

=== Italy ===
The following is the Italian roster in the women's water polo tournament of the 2012 Summer Olympics.

№	Name	Pos.	Height	Weight	Date of birth	2012 club
1	Elena Gigli	GK	1.90 m (6 ft 3 in)	76 kg (168 lb)	9 July 1985	
2	Simona Abbate	CB	1.71 m (5 ft 7 in)	64 kg (141 lb)	22 August 1983	
3	Elisa Casanova	CF	1.85 m (6 ft 1 in)	100 kg (220 lb)	26 November 1973	
6	Allegra Lapi	D	1.63 m (5 ft 4 in)	55 kg (121 lb)	8 September 1985	
7	Tania Di Mario	D	1.68 m (5 ft 6 in)	59 kg (130 lb)	4 May 1979	
8	Roberta Bianconi	D	1.75 m (5 ft 9 in)	74 kg (163 lb)	8 July 1989	
9	Giulia Enrica Emmolo	D	1.71 m (5 ft 7 in)	66 kg (146 lb)	16 October 1991	
10	Giulia Rambaldi Guidasci	DF	1.78 m (5 ft 10 in)	77 kg (170 lb)	11 November 1986	
11	Aleksandra Cotti	D	1.66 m (5 ft 5 in)	64 kg (141 lb)	13 December 1988	
12	Teresa Frassinetti	CF	1.78 m (5 ft 10 in)	72 kg (159 lb)	24 December 1985	
13	Giulia Gorlero	GK	1.78 m (5 ft 10 in)	69 kg (152 lb)	26 September 1990	
14	Anikó Pelle	CB			28 September 1978	
15	Federica Radicchi	CB			21 December 1988	

Head coach: Fabio Conti

=== Russia ===
The following is the Russian roster in the women's water polo tournament of the 2012 Summer Olympics.

№	Name	Pos.	Height	Weight	Date of birth	2012 club
1	Mariia Kovtunovskaia	GK	1.65 m (5 ft 5 in)	61 kg (134 lb)	19 December 1988	
2	Diana Antonova	D	1.68 m (5 ft 6 in)	50 kg (110 lb)	17 January 1993	
3	Alexandra Antonova	D	1.70 m (5 ft 7 in)	55 kg (121 lb)	22 December 1991	
4	Olga Belova	CB	1.67 m (5 ft 6 in)	50 kg (110 lb)	27 August 1993	
5	Evgeniya Ivanova	D	1.65 m (5 ft 5 in)	55 kg (121 lb)	26 July 1987	
6	Ekaterina Tankeeva	CF	1.68 m (5 ft 6 in)	65 kg (143 lb)	28 June 1989	
7	Ekaterina Lisunova	D	1.74 m (5 ft 9 in)	62 kg (137 lb)	6 October 1989	
8	Nadezhda Fedotova	D	1.70 m (5 ft 7 in)	65 kg (143 lb)	20 August 1988	
9	Ekaterina Prokofyeva	D	1.66 m (5 ft 5 in)	63 kg (139 lb)	13 March 1991	
10	Olga Beliaeva	CF	1.73 m (5 ft 8 in)	64 kg (141 lb)	18 March 1985	
11	Evgeniia Khokhriakova	CB	1.78 m (5 ft 10 in)	70 kg (154 lb)	26 August 1988	
12	Sofia Konukh	CF	1.73 m (5 ft 8 in)	61 kg (134 lb)	9 March 1980	
13	Anna Karnaukh	GK	1.70 m (5 ft 7 in)	55 kg (121 lb)	31 August 1993	

Head coach: Aleksandr Kabanov

== See also ==
- Water polo at the 2012 Summer Olympics – Men's team rosters
