= Daniel Marsden =

Australian water polo player

Personal information
- Born: 16 November 1970 (age 55) Sydney, Australia
- Height: 1.90 m (6 ft 3 in)
- Weight: 92 kg (203 lb)

Sport
- Sport: Water polo
- Club: Sydney Uni Water Polo Club; Balmain Water Polo Club; Queensland Breakers

Daniel Marsden (born 16 November 1970) is an Australian water polo player who competed in the 1992 and 2000 Summer Olympics. He had five goals in seven games in 1992 and eleven goals in eight games in 2000; his team finished in fifth and eights place, respectively.

He was part of the Queensland Breakers water polo team, as a player in 2007 and 2010 and as a coach in 2008–2009.

Daniel is the current men's coach of the Hunter Hurricanes in NSW.
