= Victoria Brown (water polo) =

Australian water polo goalkeeper

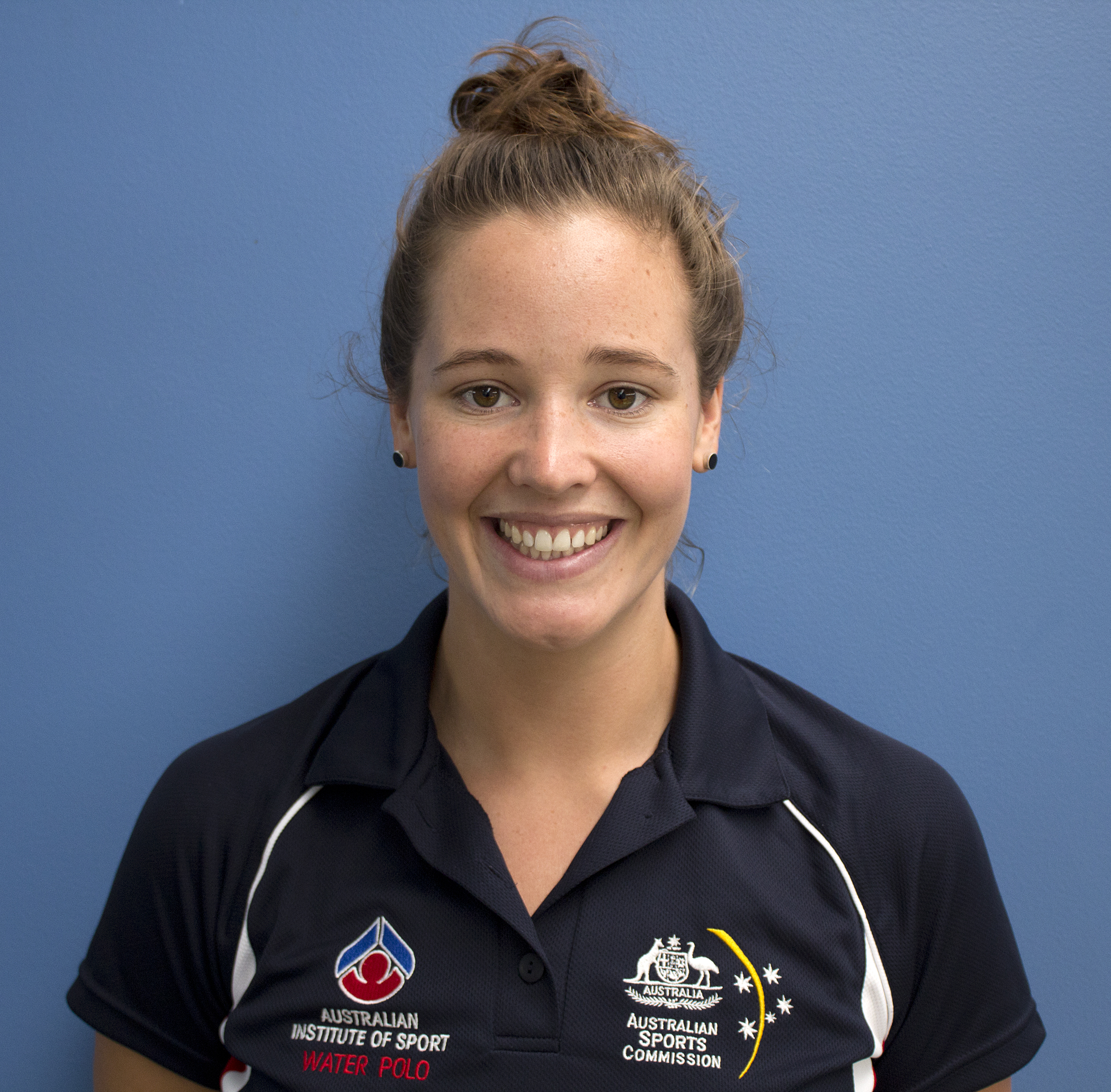

Personal information
- Full name: Victoria Jayne Brown
- Born: 27 July 1985 (age 40) Melbourne, Australia
- Height: 183 cm (6 ft 0 in) (2012)
- Weight: 76 kg (168 lb) (2012)

Sport
- Country: Australia
- Sport: Water polo
- Event: Women's team
Medal record
Women's water polo
Representing Australia
Olympic Games
Bronze medal – third place	2012 London	Team competition
FINA World Cup
Silver medal – second place	2010 Christchurch	Team competition
FINA World League Super Finals
Silver medal – second place	2012 Changshu	Team competition
Bronze medal – third place	2005 Kirishi	Team competition

Victoria Jayne Brown (born 27 July 1985) is an Australian water polo goalkeeper. She is currently a small business owner. She has represented Australia as a member of the Australia women's national water polo team on both the junior and senior level. She was a member of the Australian side that won a bronze medal at the 2005 FINA World League Super Finals and the 2010 FINA Women's Water Polo World Cup. She was part of the Australian team that won the bronze medal at the 2012 Summer Olympics. She has earned several honours including being named the 2010 Australian Water Polo Female Player of the Year.

== Personal life ==
The 183 cm (6 ft 0 in) tall 76 kilograms (168 lb) Brown, born on 27 July 1985 in Melbourne, Victoria, currently resides in Melbourne. One of her parents won a bronze medal for Australia at the Commonwealth Games. Her mother was the captain of Great Britain's fencing team and her father was the captain of Australia's fencing team. Her parents believed that she would win an Olympic gold medal in an equestrian event, as she competed in the sport until she was sixteen years old. At that age, she then switched sports to water polo. On 31 December 2010, she broke her leg in a New Year's Eve accident. During her recovery, she had to deal with a post-surgery infection.

She lived in the United States from 2006 to 2008, with the goal of improving the quality of her water polo play so she could qualify for the Olympics. In late 2010, she injured her arm and it took time to recover.

Brown attended the University of Melbourne, where she earned a bachelor's in property and construction. She worked as a business owner and consultant. In 2011, she co-founded the firm Elite Mentors, which provides guidance to elite athletes.

== Water polo ==
My main concern is getting balls thrown at my face, but you get used to that after a while ... you actually train yourself to throw your head towards the ball. ... You do get nervous, but I quite like nerves. They keep you on edge.

— Victoria Brown

Brown is a goalkeeper. She took up the sport in high school, while in Year 7, with the first team she competed for being the U17 Kawana Waters side. In 2010, she had a water polo scholarship from the Victoria Institute of Sport. She has a water polo scholarship from the Australian Institute of Sport. When actively training, she will have ten to twelve training sessions, including gym work, a week. Her home training pool is the Melbourne Sports and Aquatic Centre.

=== Club team ===
Brown is a member of the Monash water polo club and currently plays her water polo for the Victorian Tigers in the National Water Polo League. In 2005, she played for the Lauriston club in Armadale. She played for the Brisbane Barracudas in 2008. The annual match between Breakers and Barracudas is considered is one the Courier Mail considers a grudge match. She participated in the 2008 edition with her team. She played for the Victorian Tigers in 2007 and 2009. She was with the Tigers in 2010, when Cronulla played in the finals tournament; in the tournament, she was named in the league final's All Star team. She was with the Tigers again for their 2011 campaign. She briefly played with the Tigers in 2012 before taking a break following their 18 February 2012 game against the Cronulla to attend the national team training camp.

=== Junior national team ===
Brown has represented Australia on the junior national level. In 2002, her first year as a junior national team member, she competed with the national youth girls team that toured the United States in June and competed in an international series in Sydney in August. In 2004, she was a member of the team that toured Europe in July and August, and was the only Victorian woman on the team. In January 2005, she was on the junior side that competed in the VI FINA World Junior Championships in Perth.

=== Senior national team ===
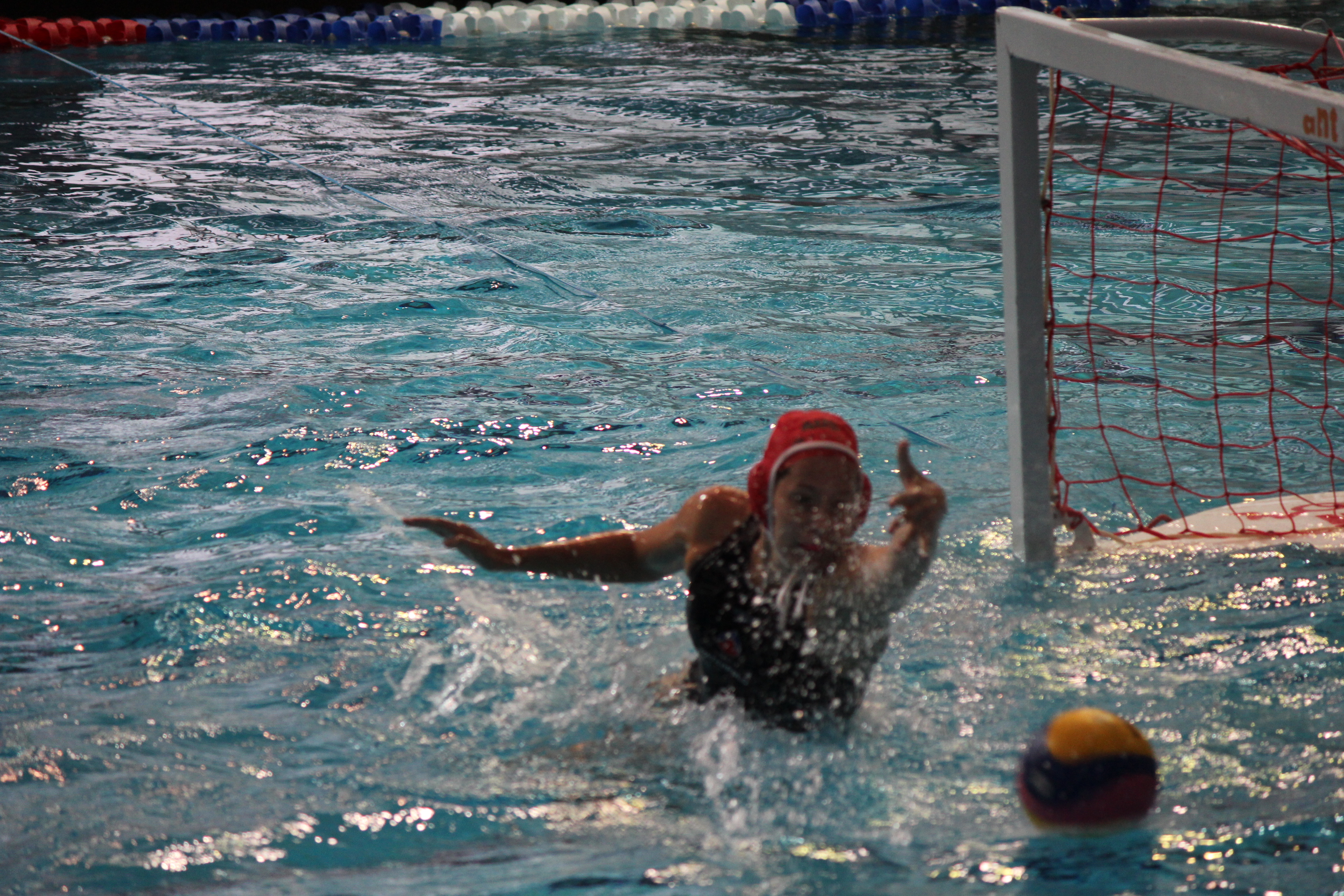
Brown during the fourth test match between Great Britain and Australia on 27 February 2012 as the AIS Aquatic Centre. Australia won 14–8.

Brown is a member of the Australia women's national water polo team. She made her national debut in Montreal at the 2005 FINA World Championships in Australia's 15–2 victory over Germany. In 2005, she was a member of the team that competed in the international series with New Zealand held in Canberra in July, the FINA World League Finals in the United States in July, the XIFINA World Championships in Montreal in July, and the II FINA World League Super Finals in Russia in August. In 2005, she was part of the side that won a bronze medal at the FINA World League Super Finals in Kirishi, Russia.

In the 2007 FINA Water Polo World League Asia-Oceania qualifiers, in Australia's 16–8 defeat of New Zealand, she made eight saves. She was named in the team that competed in the preliminary round at the 2008 FINA World League in Tianjin, China. In preparation for the Games, her coach Greg McFadden, instructed Brown and every player on the team to sit down for dinner and eat everything on their plate. She was the last player cut before the 2008 Summer Olympics squad was finalised, right before the team left for Beijing, China. She used this to motivate herself to become one of the best goalkeepers in Australia. In May 2010, she was a member of the team that competed at the FINA World League Asia-Oceania zone held in Osaka, Japan and Tianjin, China. She represented Australia at the 2010 FINA Women's Water Polo World Cup in Christchurch, New Zealand, and was a member of the Australian team that competed at the Pan Pacific Championships in 2010, the year she was named the Australian Stinger's Player of the Year. She also secured her position as the team's number one goalkeeper.

Brown is introduced before the first test series match against Great Britain

In 2011, Brown missed most of the national team season because of a broken leg and an injured arm. Nevertheless, in April 2011, she attended a training camp at the Australian Institute of Sport (AIS) where the coach was "selecting a team for the major championships over winter".

Brown was part of the Stingers squad that competed in a five-game test against Great Britain at the AIS in late February 2012. This was the team's first matches against Great Britain's national team in six years. She was part of the Stingers team that competed at the 2012 London Olympics, winning bronze, and the team that won silver at the 2012 FINA Women's Water Polo World League championships in Changshu, China.

== Recognition ==
In June 2004, Brown was named the Stonnington Leader Senior Sports Star of the Week. In 2006 and 2010, she was named to the National Water Polo League All Star Team. In 2007, she was named the Goalkeeper of the Tournament at the World League Finals. In 2009, she was named the Goalkeeper of the Tournament at the Holiday Cup held in Los Angeles, California. In 2010, she was named the Australian team Most Valuable Player. That year, Australian Water Polo named her the Female Player of the Year.

== See also ==
- Australia women's Olympic water polo team records and statistics
- List of Olympic medalists in water polo (women)
- List of women's Olympic water polo tournament goalkeepers
