= Ross Sinclair (water polo) =

American water polo player

Personal information
- Full name: Robert Sinclair III
- Nationality: American
- Born: April 12, 1985 (age 41) Laguna Beach, California; United States
- Education: UC Santa Barbara
- Height: 5 ft 10 in (178 cm)
- Weight: 175 lb (79 kg)

Sport
- Country: United States
- Sport: Men's water polo
- Position: Field
- University team: UC Santa Barbara men's water polo
- Club: Santa Barbara Water Polo Foundation; Hunter Hurricanes; Tourcoing; Victorian Tigers; Hunter Hurricanes; Drummoyne Devils; Hunter Hurricanes
- Coached by: Wolf Wigo
- Updated on 04:38, 22 September 2014 (UTC)

Ross Sinclair (born April 12, 1985) is a former professional American water polo player and current water polo head coach.

== Early life and education ==
Sinclair was born in Laguna Beach, California and played water polo at Newport Harbor High School. At Newport Harbor, he won the CIF Championship in 2000 and was twice named Sea View League Most Valuable Player in 2002 and 2003. He was also named Second Team All-CIF Southern Section in 2002 and 2003. Following graduation, he enrolled at the University of California, Santa Barbara.

While in Santa Barbara, he played for the UCSB men's water polo team from 2003 to 2007. He was named a Third Team All American his final two seasons in 2006 and 2007, which made him the 45th UCSB men's water polo player to earn All American status and the first under Wolf Wigo.

== Playing career ==
His play impressed various pro teams and once he completed college he turned pro. He signed with Hunter Hurricanes of the Australian National Water Polo League and played in his first match on January 24, 2008. He ended the season with 63 goals, good for second highest in the league.

In the off-season, Sinclair joined Enfants de Neptune de Tourcoing based in Tourcoing, France. The stay was short-lived however as a string of poor results and an uncertain future led to Sinclair leaving the club.

Sinclair rejoined the Australian NWPL and signed with Victorian Tigers. His output dropped to 29 goals for the 2009 season.

Sinclair skipped the 2010 NWPL season but rejoined Hunter Hurricanes for 2011, where he scored 46 goals.

For the 2012 season, Sinclair turned out for Drummoyne Devils, where he appeared in 17 games and scored 20 goals. He rejoined Hunter Hurricanes for his third tour of duty in 2013, where he netted a further 23 goals.

== Coaching career ==
Sinclair was named head girls' water polo coach of Corona del Mar High School in May 2013.

Sinclair was named head boys water polo coach of Newport Harbor High School in 2015

Sinclair was named head girls water polo coach of Newport High School in 2018 after Brian Melstrom's announced retirement shortly after winning Division II against Santa Barbara.
