= Isobel Bishop =

Australian water polo player

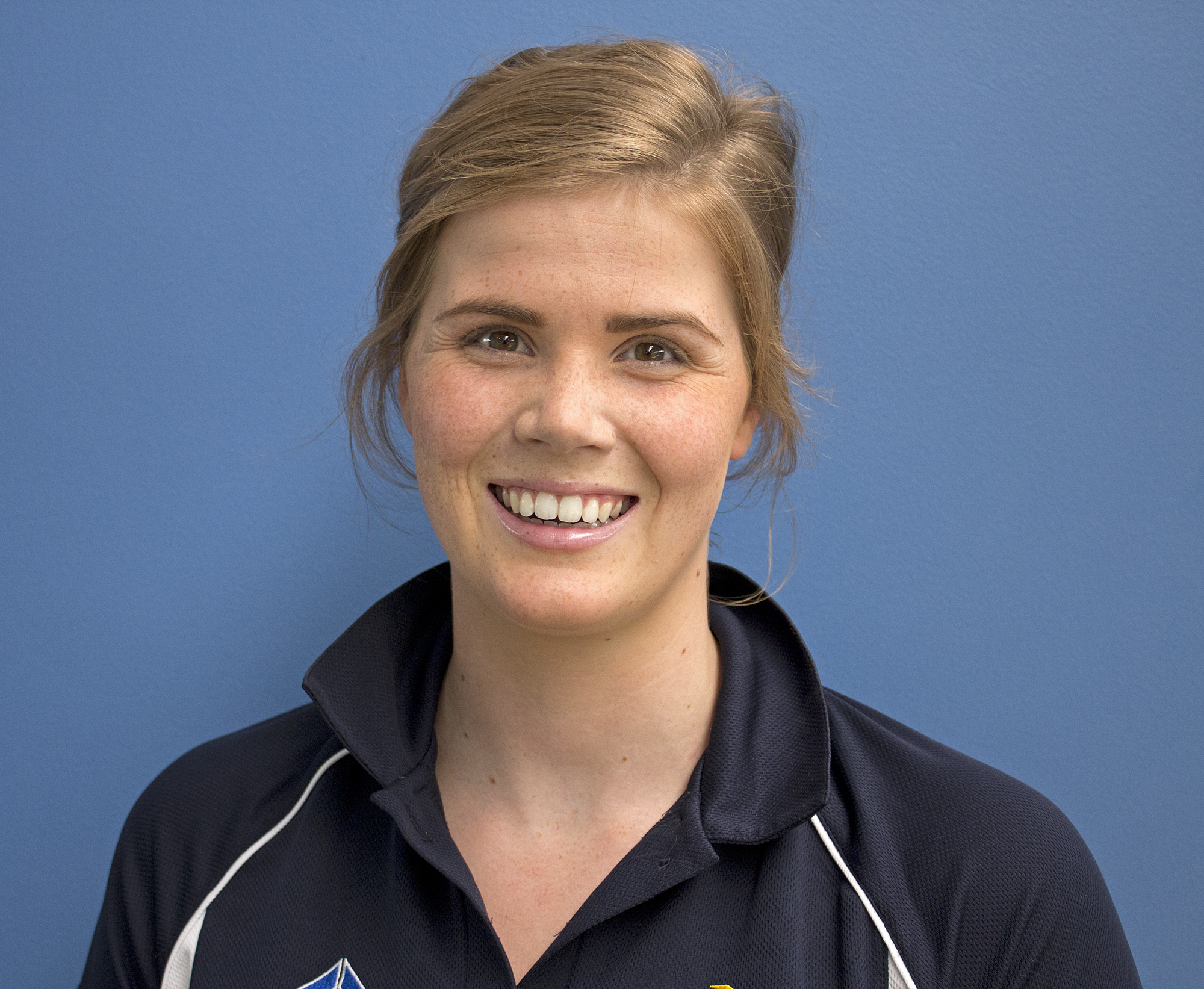

Personal information
- Nationality: Australian
- Born: 8 September 1991 (age 35) Toorak Gardens, South Australia

Sport
- Country: Australia
- Sport: Water polo
- Event: Women's team
- Club: Adelaide Jets
Medal record
World Championships
Silver medal – second place	2013 Barcelona	Team competition
Canada Cup
Gold medal – first place	2011 Canada Cup	Team competition
FINA Junior World Championships
Bronze medal – third place	2011 Junior Worlds	Team competition

Isobel Bishop (born September 8, 1991) is an Australian former water polo player. She played for the Adelaide Jets in the National Water Polo League. She was a member of the Australia women's national water polo team, and won a gold medal at the 2011 Canada Cup and another gold at the 2011 FINA Junior World Championships. She represented Australia at the 2016 Olympics.

== Personal life ==
Bishop was born on 8 September 1991 in Toorak Gardens, South Australia. Bishop attended Wilderness School in Adelaide, South Australia and completed her high school education in 2009. In 2016, Bishop was studying for a Bachelors degree in Visual Communications at the University of Technology Sydney.

== Water polo ==
Bishop played water polo left-handed. She first played the sport as a thirteen-year-old because her sister played the sport and it was offered at her school. She held a water polo scholarship from the South Australia Institute of Sport and the Australian Institute of Sport. In 2008, she trained five mornings and four evenings a week while going to high school.

=== Club water polo ===
Bishop started playing water polo for the South Australian Wilderness team based at the Adelaide Aquatic Centre. She spoke out to the press in protest of plans to make a pool at the centre shallower. Changing the depth would have made it impossible to play water polo in it, and would cause many junior area players to drive to another venue.

Bishop made her senior National Water Polo League debut in 2007 when she played for Adelaide Jets and was with the team for the 2011 season. She also played water polo for the Adelaide Tritons. In 2012, she played for the Victorian Tigers in the National Water Polo League.

=== Junior national team ===
Bishop has represented Australia on the junior national level. In January 2009, she was a member of the national team that competed at the Australian Youth Olympic Festival held in Sydney. She competed in the preliminary match against China where Australia won 17–10. She scored two goals in the match. In July 2011, she attended a training camp with the junior national team in Perth, Western Australia. She participated in the preliminary round loss to Hungary 19–17. In the match, she scored two goals. She was a member of the Australian side that finished third at the 2011 FINA Junior World Championships.

=== Senior national team ===
Bishop was a member of the Australia women's national water polo team. She had her first call up to the senior national team in December 2009. In 2010, she was a member of the national team that competed in the preliminary rounds of the FINA World League in Japan from 21 to 23 May and in China from 26 to 28 May. In 2011, she was training to make the 2012 Olympic squad. At the 2011 Canada Cup, she scored a goal in the third period in the gold medal match against China that the Australian team won.

She competed in the Pan Pacific Championships in January 2012 for the Australian Stingers. She was part of the Stingers squad that competed in a five-game test against Great Britain at the AIS in late February 2012. This was the team's first matches against Great Britain's national team in six years. She competed in the 2016 Olympics as part of the Australian team that placed sixth.

== See also ==
- List of World Aquatics Championships medalists in water polo
