= Hannah Buckling =

Australian water polo centre back

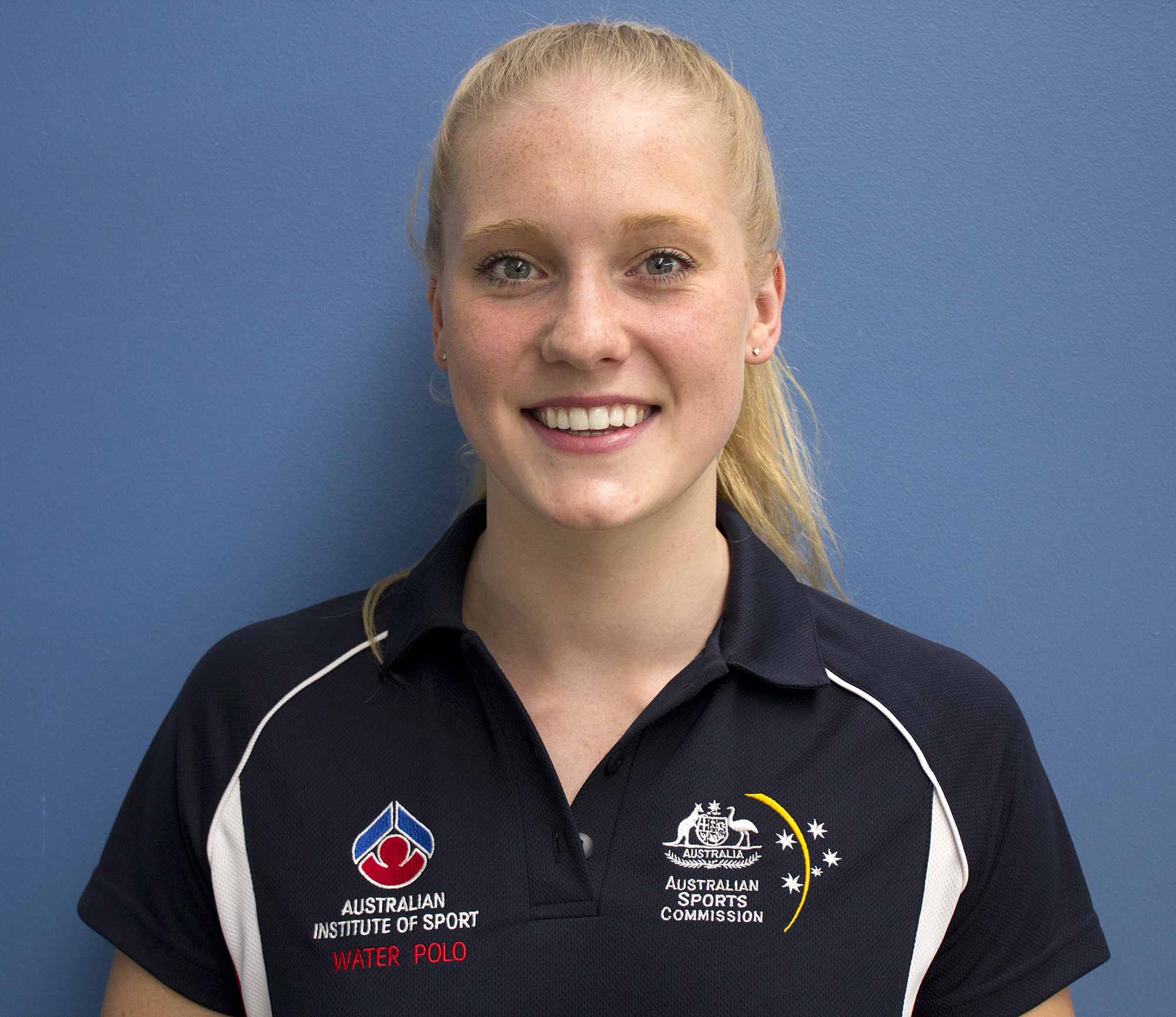

Personal information
- Nationality: Australian
- Born: 3 June 1992 (age 34) Sydney, Australia
- Height: 177 cm (5 ft 10 in)
- Weight: 75 kg (165 lb)

Sport
- Country: Australia
- Sport: Water Polo
- Event: Women's team
- Club: Sydney Northern Beaches Breakers
- Team: Sydney Uni Water Polo Club
Medal record
World Championships
Silver medal – second place	2013 Barcelona	Team competition
Bronze medal – third place	2019 Gwangju	Team competition
Canada Cup
Gold medal – first place	2011 Canada Cup	Team competition
FINA Junior World Championships
Bronze medal – third place	2011 Junior Worlds	Team competition

Hannah Buckling (born 3 June 1992) is an Australian water polo centre back. As a representative of Australia on the junior and senior level, she had her first international cap during the 2008 Australian Junior Tour at the Pythia Cup. She was a member of the Australian side that finished third at the 2011 FINA Junior World Championships. As a member of the senior team, she competed at the 2011 Canada Cup and helped the team take home gold. She competed in the 2016 and 2020 Olympic Games

== Personal life ==
Buckling was born on 3 June 1992 in Sydney, but calls Mosman, New South Wales her hometown. Her grandfather represented Wales as a member of the Wales School Boy team in rugby union. She attended Wenona Girls School located in North Sydney, New South Wales. She received her Bachelor of Science at the University of Sydney in 2014. Due to the COVID-19 pandemic and the postponement of the 2020 Tokyo Olympics, she was able to return to her studies at the Sydney Medical Program to continue her post-graduate medical degree. She is 177 cm (5 ft 10 in) tall, weights 75 kilograms (165 lb) and is right handed.

== Water polo ==
Buckling prefers to wear cap number six and plays in the centre back position. She started playing water polo as a twelve-year-old in Year 7 at Wenona Girls School. In 2011, she was named a Sydney Uni Sport & Fitness/St Andrew's College Foundation Awards winner because of her water polo. She has a water polo scholarship from the New South Wales Institute of Sport.

=== Club and state representative teams ===
When she was Buckling, she joined the Sydney Northern Beaches Breakers water polo team who continue to be her water polo club. One of her club teammates was another future national team member, Emily Scott. Buckling gave Scott advice related to future planning for water polo playing. While playing the sport casually on school and club level, she got a new coach at the Breakers, Jamie Ryan. Jamie Ryan helped elevate Buckling's intensity at practice and become a more serious player. In 2007, she was a member of the New South Wales development squad and competed on the 2007 16 & Under National Championships Girls where she scored 15 goals in the competition. In 2008, she again represented New South Wales at the 2008 16 & Under National Championships Girls where she scored 13 goals. At the 18 & Under National Championships Girls in 2008, she scored only 8 goals. In 2009, at the 18 & Under Girls National Championship and as a member of the New South Wales side, she scored 8 goals. That same year, as a member of the New South Wales team at the 20 & Under National Championships Junior Women, she scored 8 goals. In 2010, she scored 18 goals in the 18 & Under Girls National Championship and 6 goals in the 20 & Under National Championships Junior Women. In 2011, she scored 8 goals in the 20 & Under Junior Women National Championships. That year, her team finished second at the Perth, Western Australia held event. In 2011, her training consisted of going to the pool every morning, and doing training at the gym three times a week. During the summer, she would compete in up to three games a week. During the winter, she would compete in an average of one game a week.

=== National Water Polo League ===
Buckling plays for the Sydney Uni Lions of the National Water Polo League. In 2011, her first year in the league, she wore cap number 14 and fifteen total goals for the season. Her largest single goal came was on 15 March against the Fyfe Adelaide Jets. During the 2012 season, she wore cap number four. As of 3 March, she had scored sixteen goals in the season.

=== Junior national team ===
Within 20 months of having Jamie Ryan being her coach on her local club side and as a fifteen-year-old, she made the Australian u-17 team with her first international appearance for Australia occurring at the 2008 Australian Junior Tour at the Pythia Cup in Greece where her team was runners-up. The tour also included stops in Italy and Hungary. In 2010, she was a member of the under-19 women's national water polo team that did a European tour. In 2010, as a member of the junior national team, she was a member of the team that toured California and part of the squad that competed in international friendlies against the United States, New Zealand and Canada. She was part of the junior national team again in 2011 and in July, she was invited to be part of the training squad for the junior national squad that was training in Perth in preparation for the Junior World Championships. She was a member of the Australian side that finished third at the 2011 FINA Junior World Championships.

=== Senior national team ===
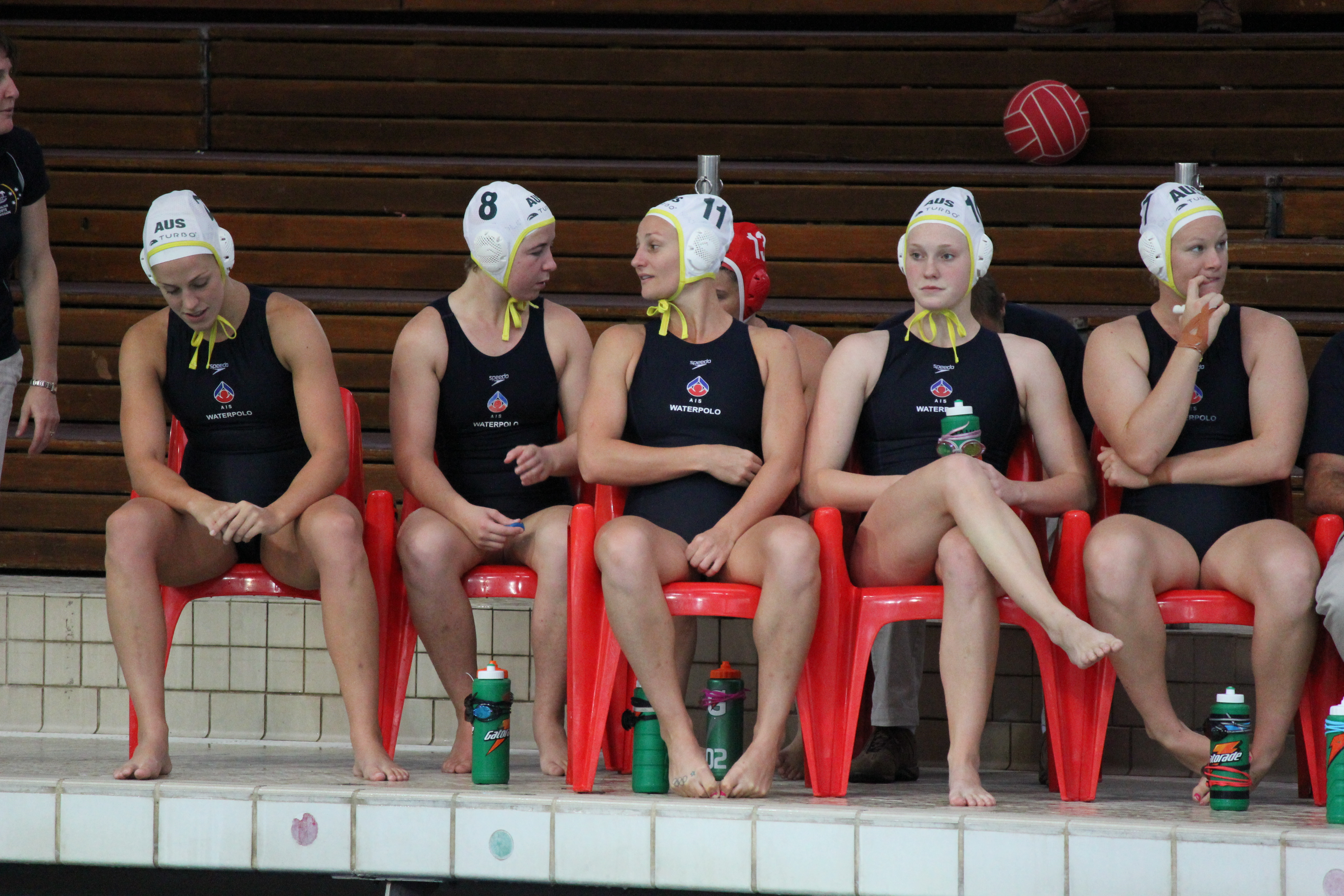
The third of a five-game test series against the Great Britain women's national water polo team on 25 February 2012. Australia won 15–6. On the far left is Bronwen Knox, then Zoe Arancini, Melissa Rippon, Rowena Webster, Hannah Buckling.

Buckling is a member of the Australia women's national water polo team. At the 2011 Canada Cup, she scored a goal in the first period in the gold medal match against China that the Australian team ended up winning. She competed in the Pan Pacific Championships in January 2012 for the Australian Stingers. She scored a goal in a Stingers 8–7 win over the United States. In 2011, her goal was to make the national team and compete at the 2016 Summer Olympics. She was part of the Stingers squad that competed in a five-game test against Great Britain at the AIS in late February 2012. This was the team's first matches against Great Britain's national team in six years.

Buckling was a member of the Australian Stingers squad that competed at the Tokyo 2020 Olympics. By finishing second in their pool, the Aussie Stingers went through to the quarterfinals. They were beaten 8-9 by Russia and therefore did not compete for an Olympic medal.

== See also ==
- List of World Aquatics Championships medalists in water polo
