= Ashleigh Southern =

Australian water polo player (born 1992)

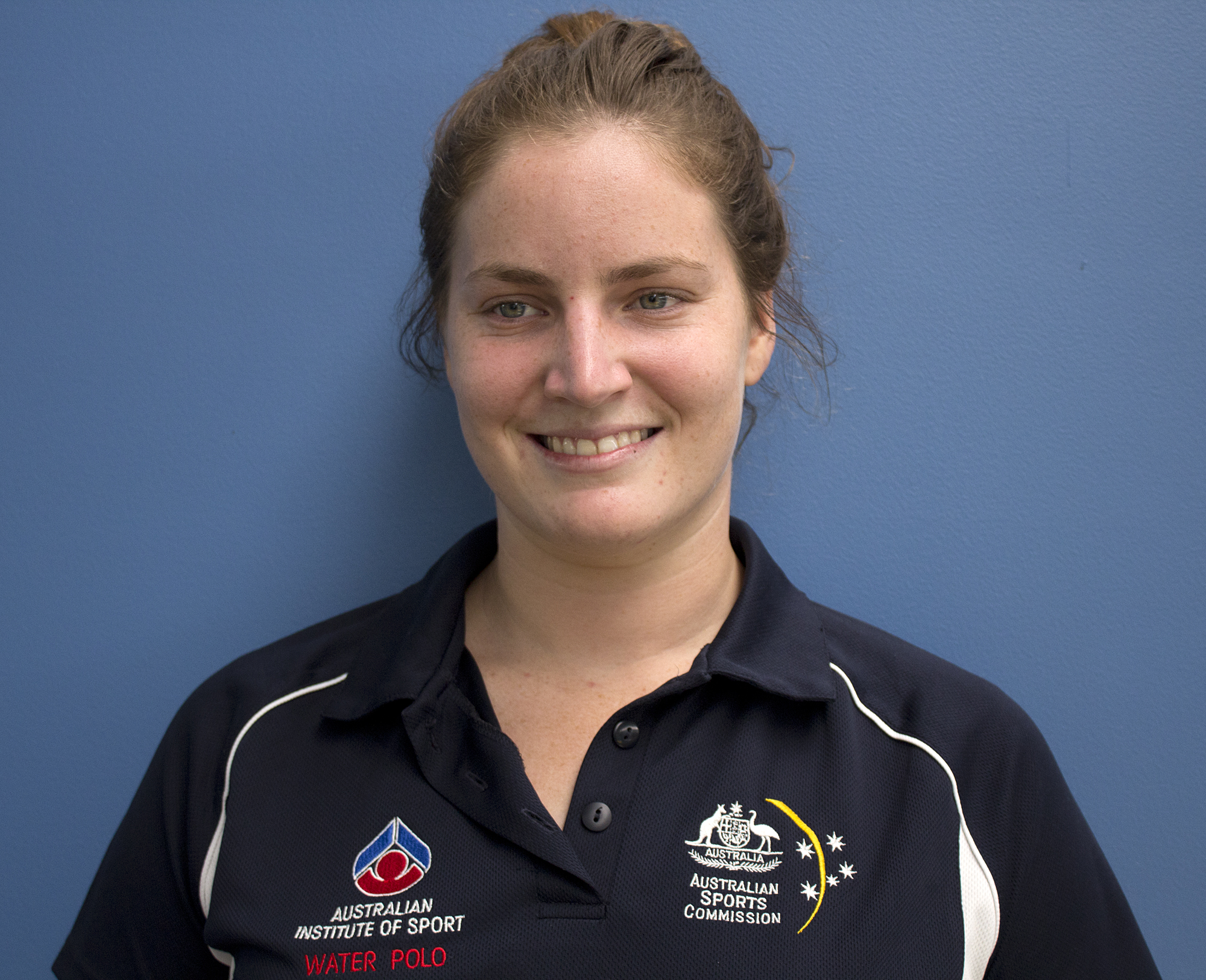

Personal information
- Nationality: Australian
- Born: 22 October 1992 (age 34) Ingham, Queensland, Australia
- Height: 188 cm (6 ft 2 in)
- Weight: 78 kg (172 lb)

Sport
- Sport: Water polo
- Event: Women's team
- Team: Brisbane Barracudas
Medal record
Olympic Games
Bronze medal – third place	2012 London	Team competition
World Championships
Silver medal – second place	2013 Barcelona	Team competition
Youth Olympic Festival
Gold medal – first place	2009 Australia	Team competition
FINA Women's Water Polo World Cup
Silver medal – second place	2010 New Zealand	Team competition
FINA World League
Bronze medal – third place	2011 World League	Team competition
FINA Junior World Championships
Bronze medal – third place	2011 Junior Worlds	Team competition

Ashleigh Southern (born 22 October 1992) is an Australian water polo player. She is a centre forward or outside shooter who has represented Australia on the junior and senior national teams. She won a gold medal at the 2009 Youth Olympic Festival, a silver medal at the 2010 FINA Women's Water Polo World Cup, a bronze medal at the 2011 FINE World League and a bronze medal at the 2011 FINA Junior World Championships. She plays club water polo for the Brisbane Barracudas, where she won a league championship in 2010. In 2014–15 season, she played for the Greek powerhouse Olympiacos where she won the LEN Euroleague, scoring 4 goals in the 10–9 win of Olympiacos against Sabadell in the final of the competition. She represented Australia at the 2012 and 2016 Olympics.

== Personal life ==
Southern was born on 22 October 1992 in Ingham, Queensland. She is 188 cm (6 ft 2 in) tall, and is right handed. Southern has attended Cardwell State School and Gilroy Santa Maria College. She lives in Cardwell, Queensland and attends the Brisbane North Institute of TAFE, where she is studying for a Diploma of Justice. Southern has a brother who has represented Australia on the junior national team. In late 2011, she had an elbow injury.

== Water polo ==
Southern plays in the centre forward or outside shooter position, She has worn number 4, but prefers to wear the number 10 cap. Southern first represented Queensland on a state level in water polo as a ten-year-old on the state's U14 team. Southern started playing water polo in Townsville when she was eleven years old. As a young player, she traveled between Cardwell and Townsville in order to play. While competing for a school team, she was selected to participate in a development camp. She won a water polo scholarship from the Queensland Academy of Sport in 2010, and currently holds a water polo scholarship at the Australian Institute of Sport. In 2008, Southern competed in the Women's International Series. Her arm has been described as lethal, and better than most women players by Greg McFadden, the coach of the national team. She is characterised by the Brisbane Courier Mail as being the "Happy Gilmore" of the national team.

=== Club team ===
Southern plays club water polo for the Brisbane Barracudas in the National Water Polo League, where she wears cap number 10. Southern was with the team for the 2010, 2011 and 2012 seasons. Her 2010 team won the league championship. Prior to that, she played for the New South Wales based Drummoyne Devils in 2009.

In 2014–15 season, she played for the Greek champions Olympiacos in the European competitions, winning the LEN Euroleague. She was instrumental in Olympiacos' triumph, scoring 4 crucial goals in the 10–9 win against Sabadell in the Euroleague final.

=== Junior national team ===
In January 2009, Southern was a member of the national team that competed at the Australian Youth Olympic Festival held in Sydney, and competed in the preliminary match against China that Australia won 17–10, scoring three goals. She participated in the preliminary round loss to Hungary 19–17, scoring four goals. At the same tournament, Southern scored one goal in the gold medal finals match where her team took silver following a 10–9 loss to Hungary. In July 2010, she was a member of the Born '91 junior national team that toured New Zealand and the United States. She was a member of the Australian side that finished third at the 2011 FINA Junior World Championships.

=== National team ===
Southern has competed for the Australian Stingers, having made her debut in 2010 at the Longmont Tournament, which is also known as the Sydney Anniversary Tournament. At that tournament she scored eight goals in a 10–8 finals win over the United States. In two other games in the tournament, Southern scored three goals in each. She was a member of the Stingers squad that competed at the FINA World Cup in Christchurch, New Zealand in 2010 that finished second.

In February 2011, Southern was a member of the team that competed against Italy in the International Series in Perth, Western Australia. In the second and third matches against Italy, she scored one goal and netted another two goals in the fourth match. Southern was a member of the team that toured Europe in June 2011. At the Kirishi Cup, in Kirishi, Russia in June 2011, she scored three goals in the match against Greece, three in the match against Hungary and five in the match against Kazakhstan. She also scored a goal in a friendly against Italy. That year, Southern was a member of the team that finished third at the FINA World League Finals.

Southern competed in the Pan Pacific Championships in January 2012 for the Stingers, scoring a goal in a Stingers 8–7 win over the United States. She also scored one goal in the game against Brazil and two goals in the game against China. Southern was part of the team that competed at the International Series in Melbourne, Victoria, scoring two goals in the second match against Canada. She was a member of the squad that competed in a January 2012 three game test series against the United States women's national water polo team. The team won two of the three matches, with scores of 12–13 in an opening series loss, winning 11–6 in the second match and winning the third match 12–7 clash at Sutherland Leisure Centre. Southern scored three goals in the first half of the final match in the series.

In late February 2012, Southern was part of the Stingers squad that competed in a five-game test against Great Britain at the Australian Institute of Sport, the team's first matches against Great Britain's national team in six years. In the first game of the test series on 21 February 2012, which Australia won 13–5, she scored four goals. Southern did not compete in the second or third games, but in Australia's fourth game victory of 14–8, she scored two goals.

=== Olympics ===
Southern represented Australia at the 2012 and 2016 Olympics.

== Recognition ==
In 2010, Southern was named the Junior Runner Up at the Business Technology Centre North Queensland Sportstar Awards, which included a A$1,000 prize that her mother picked up as Southern was unable to attend the award ceremony. In 2011, she was named the Senior Runner Up at the Business Technology Centre North Queensland Sportstar Awards, which came with a A$500 prize, and won the Cassowary Coast Regional Councils Senior Sports Award.

== See also ==
- Australia women's Olympic water polo team records and statistics
- List of Olympic medalists in water polo (women)
- List of women's Olympic water polo tournament top goalscorers
- List of World Aquatics Championships medalists in water polo
