= Tom Hoad =

Australian water polo player

Tom Hoad AM
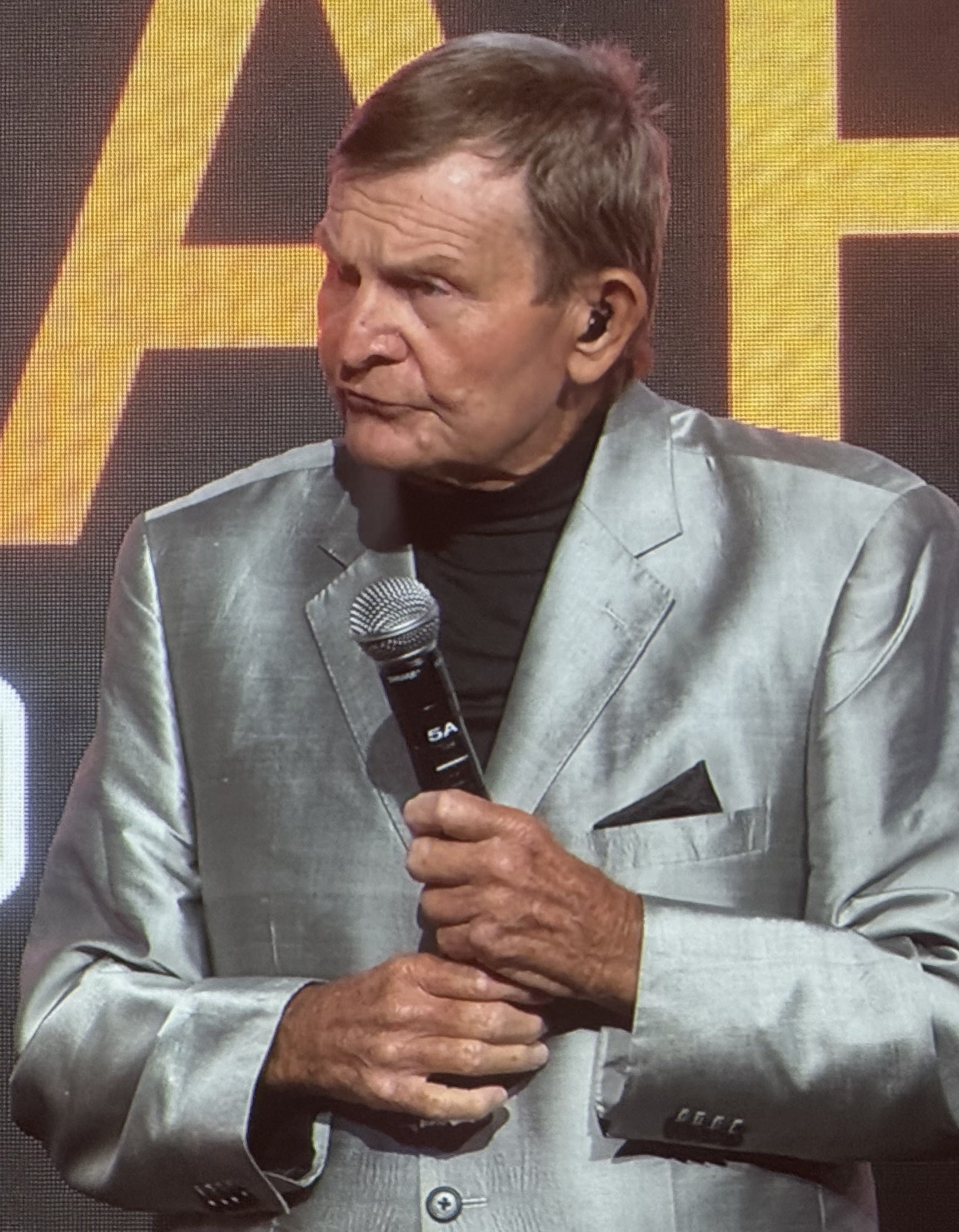
- Hoad in 2026
- Born: 22 March 1940 (age 85); Perth, Western Australia
- Education: Aquinas College, Perth
- Occupation: Water polo player/coach
- Title: Left Handed Lightning

Thomas Hoad AM (born 22 March 1940) is an Australian water polo coach and former player. In 1968, he was appointed to International Swimming Federation (FINA), the world governing body for swimming and was chairman of the 1998 World Swimming Championships held in Perth, Western Australia. He is currently a director of the national controlling body Australian Water Polo. He currently coaches juniors at Melville and at a state level in WA.

Hoad represented Australia in water polo at the Olympic Games four times, in 1960, 1964, 1968 and 1972, as well as being captain from 1964 to 1972. He was the Australian water polo coach at the 1976, 1980, 1984 and 1988 games.

Hoad coached the 'Fremantle Mariners' to three Australian National League titles out of an unprecedented nine consecutive grand final appearances.

He was a University of Western Australia sports star in 1964. He was made a Member of the Order of Australia (AM) in the 1994 Australia Day Honours for "service to sport, particularly water polo".

The Tom Hoad Cup is an international water polo cup named in his honour. First held in 2003, it is played annually in Perth.

In 2009, Hoad was inducted into the Water Polo Australia Hall of Fame. In 2011, he was inducted into the International Swimming Hall of Fame. In 2021, he was inducted into the Sport Australia Hall of Fame as general member.

In February 2026, Hoad was honoured as a May Campbell Medallist at the 2025 WA Sports Awards for his distinguished service to sport.

== See also ==
- List of members of the International Swimming Hall of Fame
