= Rowena Webster =

Australian water polo player

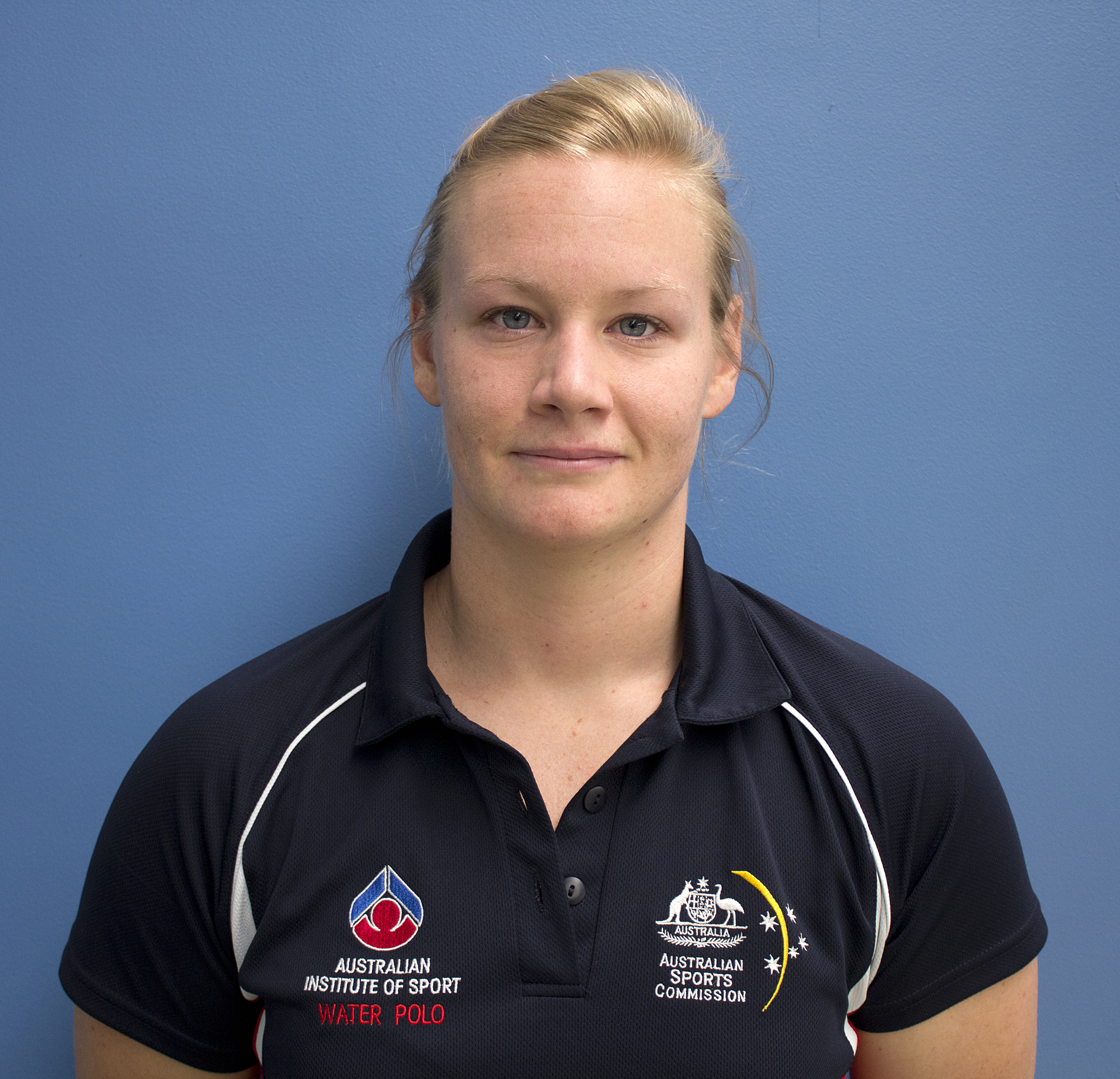
- Webster in 2012

Personal information
- Full name: Rowena Evelyn Webster
- Nickname: Rowie
- Nationality: Australian
- Born: 27 December 1987 (age 38) Melbourne, Victoria
- Height: 177 cm (5 ft 10 in)
- Weight: 81 kg (179 lb)

Sport
- Country: Australia
- Sport: Water polo
- Event: Women's team
- College team: Arizona State University
- Club: Richmond Tigers
- Team: Balmain Water Polo Club
- Turned pro: 2008

Achievements and titles
- Olympic finals: London 2012, Rio 2016
Medal record
Olympic Games
Bronze medal – third place	2012 London	Team competition
World Championships
Silver medal – second place	2013 Barcelona	Team competition
Bronze medal – third place	2019 Gwangju	Team competition
Canada Cup
Gold medal – first place	2011 Canada Cup	Team competition
FINA Junior World Championships
Gold medal – first place	2007 Porto, Portugal	Team competition
FINA Women's Water Polo World Cup
Bronze medal – third place	2010 World Cup	Team competition
FINA World League Super Finals
Silver medal – second place	2010 La Jolla, USA	Team competition
Bronze medal – third place	2009 Kirishi, Russia	Team competition

Rowena Evelyn Webster (born 27 December 1987), known as Rowie Webster, is an Australian water polo centre back and a three-time Olympian. She is one of three Australian players to play more than 300 international games for Australia. She has represented Australia as a member of Australia women's national water polo team on both the junior and senior level. Webster is a London Olympic bronze medalist, Junior World Champion, and was rated in the top 3 players in the world two years in a row (2013, 2014). Webster was the Australian Women's Water Polo Captain at the 2020 Olympics.

== Personal life ==
Webster was born on 27 December 1987 in Melbourne, Victoria. Her grandfather was Warwick Wathen, who competed in the Davis Cup as a junior. Her mother is a physiotherapist, her father a builder. Webster is the youngest of four children and her oldest sister Larissa Webster also played water polo for Australia.

Webster is 177 cm (5 ft 10 in) tall, weighs 81 kilograms (179 lb) and is right handed. She has five tattoos and loves how she can express herself through body image and art.

Webster attended Korowa Anglican Girls' School and used to play Australian rules football as a youngster. She has always been extremely competitive in basketball and surf life saving, and iub 2012 was the vice-captain of the National women's water polo team. She took up surf lifesaving as a seven-year-old at the Anglesea Surf life saving club. She studied for her Victorian Certificate of Education in 2005. She spent a year studying at Arizona State University on scholarship where she studied physical education secondary teaching and completed her degree in Melbourne at Deakin University. She is currently on scholarship at the Victorian Institute of Sport. She completed a Bachelor of physical education in secondary teaching, and is living in Balwyn North, Victoria.

Her Stingers teammates say she is a fierce competitor and loves to win. She has a Nike shoe collection and adds to it on every international tour. She is openly lesbian.

== Water polo ==
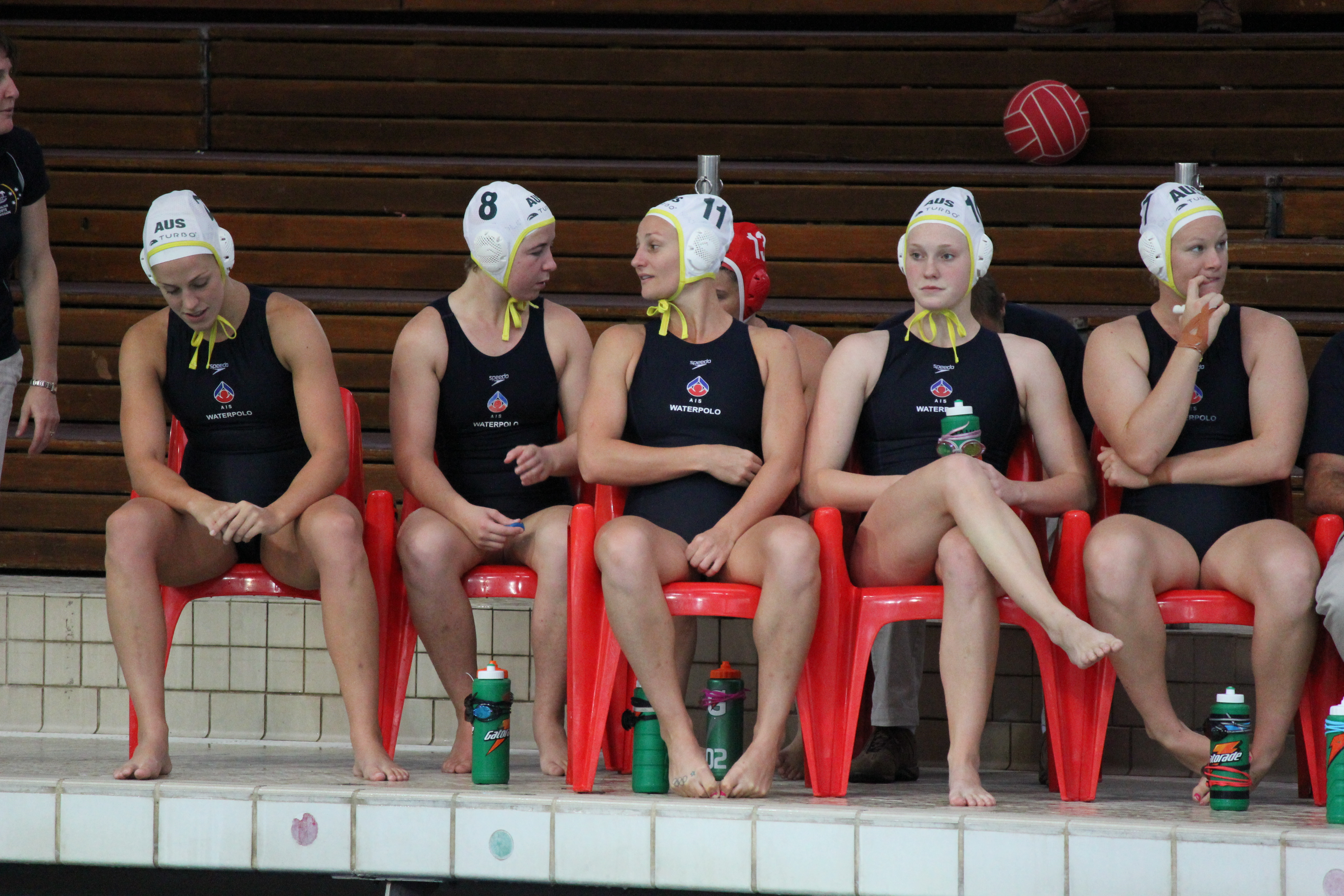
The third of a five-game test series against the Great Britain women's national water polo team on 25 February 2012. Australia won 15–6. On the far left is Bronwen Knox, then Zoe Arancini, Melissa Rippon, Hannah Buckling, Rowena Webster.

Webster started playing water polo as a ten-year-old, and more seriously as a twelve-year-old in Melbourne, Australia acting as a fill-in for her older sister's team at that age. In 2010 and 2011, she had a water polo scholarship from the Victorian Institute of Sport. She prefers to wear cap number seven and is a utility player who can be found in the centre back position. She has scars on her back from opposition players biting her there during games. She feels a need to wear a mouth guard during every game she plays. Her water polo club is the Richmond Tigers. In 2003, she played for the club at State League Level 1, the highest ability league open to players of all ages. She first represented the state of Victoria in 2000. In 2003, she was Victorian team captain. In 2003, she woke up at "4.40 am twice a week for training and swimming three afternoons a week". In 2005, she was putting in "three gym sessions, three swimming drills, [and] six rounds of water polo practice" a week. That year, she represented the state of Victoria at the Australian Water Polo Championships. She also represented the state in 2005 at the National Schoolgirls Water Polo Competition held Noosa, Queensland.

=== Club water polo ===
Webster currently plays for the Balmain Water Polo Club National Team and captains the side. She played for the Victorian Tigers of the National Water Polo League in 2004 during the team's first year of existence. She also played for the team in 2005, 2007, 2009, 2010, 2011 and 2012.

=== University water polo ===
Webster attended Arizona State in Tempe, Arizona on a water polo scholarship when she was an eighteen-year-old but only spent a year with the team.

=== Professional water polo ===
As a nineteen-year-old, Webster played for a professional team in Greece for five months in 2008. While playing in Greece, she had to deal with a culture of water polo that tolerated biting of other players during games. She left Greece to concentrate on making Australia's national team for the Olympics.

=== Senior national team ===
Webster is the captain and a member of the Australia women's national water polo team and has played over 300 games for Australia. She was a member of the London Olympic Team that won bronze in 2012 and has been an integral part of the 2013 World Championships team that won silver and the 2014 World Cup team that also won silver. Webster was the highest goal scorer for Team Australia at the 2012 London Olympics. Webster holds the Australian record for most goals in a National League Season (99 goals). She has also played over 250 games in the league.

Webster was the captain of the Australian Stingrays squad that competed at the Tokyo 2020 Olympics. By finishing second in their pool, the Aussie Stingers went through to the quarterfinals. They were beaten 8-9 by Russia and therefore did not compete for an Olympic medal.

== See also ==
- Australia women's Olympic water polo team records and statistics
- List of Olympic medalists in water polo (women)
- List of women's Olympic water polo tournament top goalscorers
- List of World Aquatics Championships medalists in water polo
