= Lambton, New South Wales =

Lambton
- Suburb
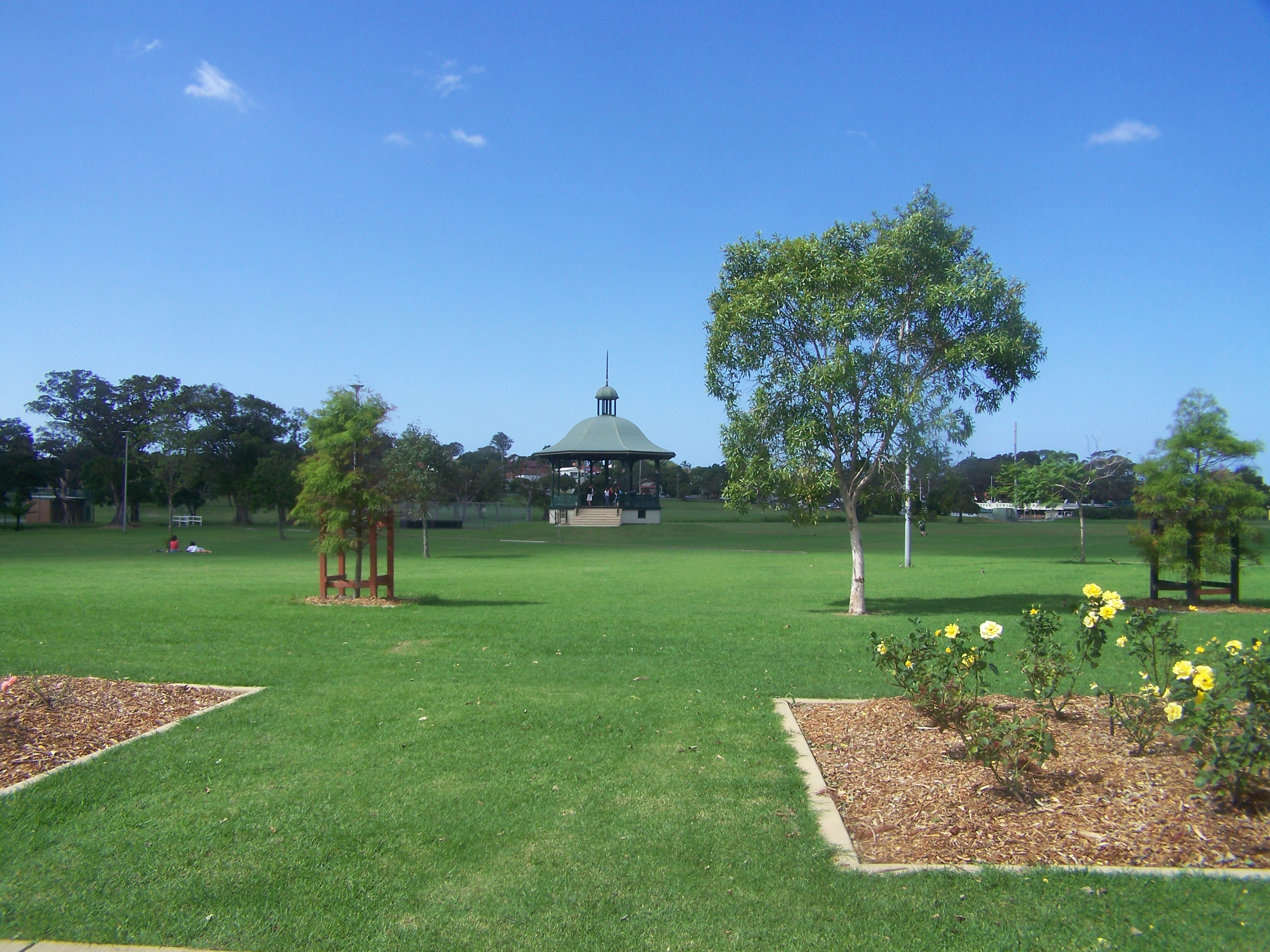
- Lambton Park

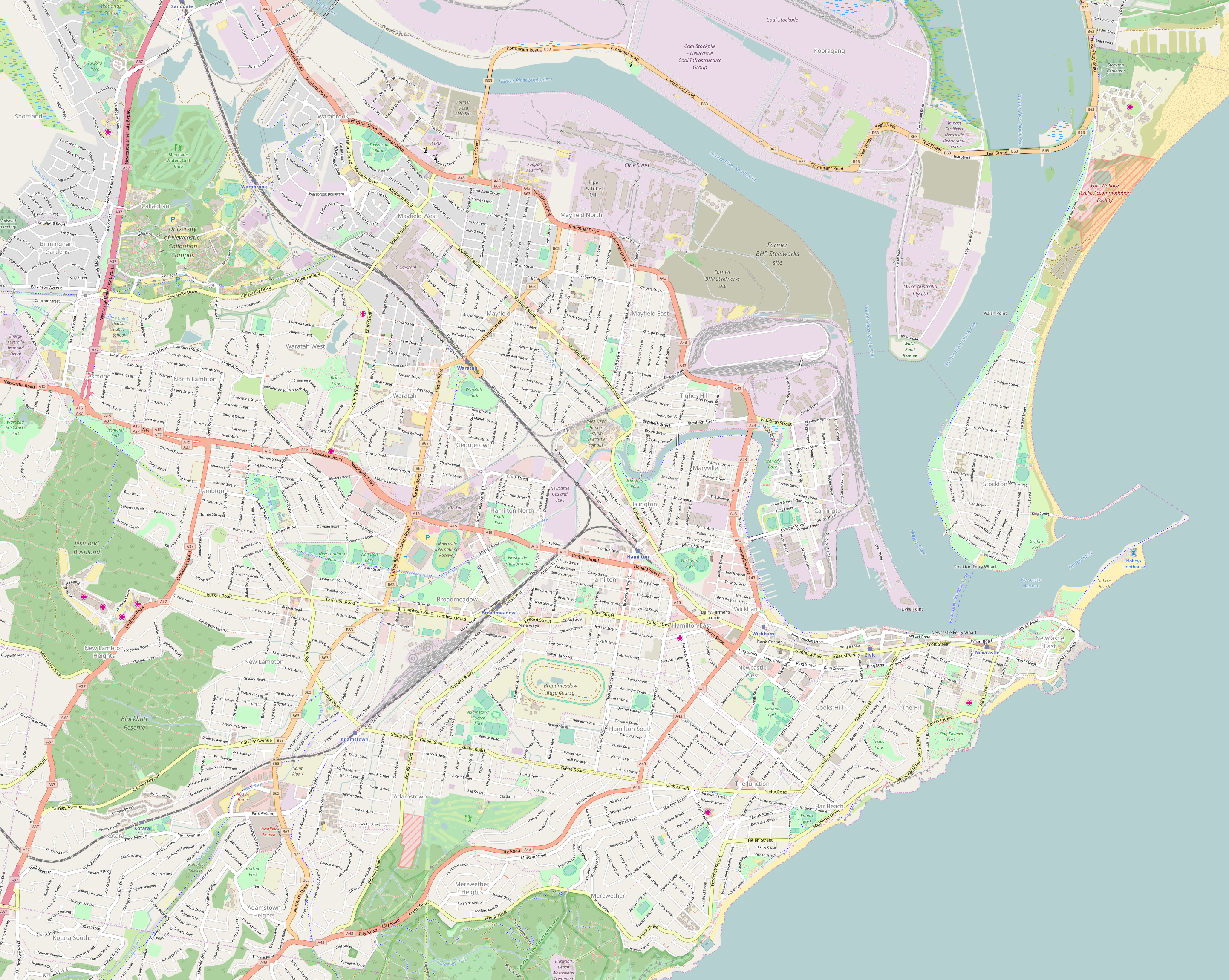
- Interactive map of Lambton
- Coordinates: 32°54′48″S 151°42′34″E
- Country: Australia
- State: New South Wales
- Region: Hunter
- City: Newcastle
- LGA: City of Newcastle
- Location: 8 km (5.0 mi) W of Newcastle; 30 km (19 mi) SE of Maitland; 151 km (94 mi) NNE of Sydney
- Established: 1871

Government
  - State electorates: Wallsend; Newcastle
  - Federal division: Newcastle

Area
  - Total: 3 km^{2} (1.2 sq mi)
- Elevation: 27 m (89 ft)

Population
  - Total: 5,214 (SAL 2021)
- Postcode: 2299
- Parish: Newcastle
Suburbs around Lambton
Jesmond	North Lambton	Waratah
Wallsend	Lambton	Broadmeadow
New Lambton Heights	New Lambton	Broadmeadow

Lambton is a suburb of Newcastle, New South Wales, Australia, 8 kilometres (5.0 mi) from Newcastle's central business district.

== History ==
The first people of this land were the Awabakal whose territory included Lambton. The Awabakal tribe were hunters and gatherers who would keep moving in order to prevent exhausting their supplies, camping at various sites for days and sometimes weeks.

Lambton's history is defined by the Lambton Colliery, named after the mine's manager Thomas Croudace's family friend, Lord Lambton, Earl of Durham that opened in 1863, which spurred the development of the township taking on the mines name.

=== Colliery ===
The largest and principal industry was the Scottish-Australian Mining Company's Lambton Colliery, which was formally opened with a celebratory dinner in December 1863. The colliery was initially managed by Thomas Croudace, and then from July 1892 by his son Frank Croudace. The mine closed in 1936, although the railway line which connected it with Newcastle Harbour remained operational until 1963, providing coal transport for other nearby mines. Today the area of the main pit entrance of Lambton colliery is occupied by Lewis Oval and surrounding houses.

=== Municipality ===
Lambton was proclaimed as a Municipality on 24 June 1871 and operated until 1938, when it joined with ten other local councils to create the City of Greater Newcastle Council. Over its 67-year history, Lambton Council counted 97 aldermen among its membership, including 28 who served as mayor.

Mayors	Periods of Office
Uriah Broom	1871–1872
William Lightfoot	1873
Thomas Abel	1874–1876
Dr. J.J. Hill	1877–1878, 1882
William Thomas Dent	1879–1880, 1890–1891
Thomas Croudace	1883–1884, 1893
Thomas Grierson	1886–1887
A.L. Payne	1888, 1907, 1910–1911
Matthew Thornton	1889, 1899–1903
Joseph Palmer	1892
William Conn	1894–1895
George E. Hardy	1896, 1918, 1920
James Young	1897
Henry Burg	1898–1899
Edward Charlton	1903–1904, 1916–1917, 1919, 1929
George Noble	1905
John R. Bell	1906
William M^{c}Ewan	1909–1909
J.T. Johnson	1912–1913, 1923–1925, 1930, 1932, 1937–1938
L.E. Polak	1914–1915, 1921
George E. Hardy	1918, 1920
J.C. Lightfoot	1922
George Alfred Bell	1926
J.W. White	1927
Ralph W. Notley	1928, 1935–1936
John A. Doyle	1931
Edward Box	1933

The longest serving Mayor was John Thomas Johnson, who served a total of 8 years as Mayor during the period 1912 to 1938, on five separate occasions. The four longest serving Mayors have streets in Lambton/North Lambton named after them – Johnson, Charlton, Dent, and Croudace.

=== Other ===
In the early years the miners of the township used to entertain themselves gambling on dog races, known as the "Dog & Rat" because they would release a rat (wallaby) on flat open area then let their dogs chase it down. The dog that caught the rat won (the rat won if it made it to the scrub).

In 1868 the first church was built in Lambton for the Welsh Baptist Church. Their first service was conducted entirely in Welsh.

Lambton was the first Municipality in Newcastle to adopt and be lit by electric lights. The Mayor’s wife, Isabella Dent, switched on the lights at a ceremony on 9 September 1890. A song called "The Lambton Lights" by Newcastle musician Bob Corbett was written in 2008 about the electrification of the town.

The 1891 Census gave the population as 3,434.

In 1901 there were 14 churches, a Music Hall, Assembly Rooms, a Temperance Hall, a Mechanics' Institute, Miners' Institute, a Post office, Telegraph and Money Order Office, a Savings Bank, Court House, Fire Brigade, Council Chambers, and a public school.

Matthew Charlton was an Australian politician who served as leader of the Australian Labor Party (ALP) and Leader of the Federal Opposition. Charlton's father moved with his family to Lambton, when he was 5 years old where he attended Lambton Public School. On 5 December 1903 Charlton became the second member for the state electoral district of Waratah in the New South Wales Legislative Assembly. He resigned from state politics and in 1910 Charlton wrested the federal Division of Hunter. He was leader of the Labor Party from 16 May 1922 – 29 March 1928.

== Lambton Park ==
Lambton Park is the green jewel of the suburb, an approximately 14 hectare site in the middle of Lambton. The park has a natural water course, Lambton Ker-rai Creek, intersecting its full length with the western end naturalised and contains a playground, picnic areas, playing fields (Harry Edwards Oval and Lambton Oval) and tennis courts with a shared path circumnavigating its entire boundary. It is also home to the Lambton Park War Memorial Swimming Centre, Lambton library (originally the Lambton Council Chambers; a branch of Newcastle Libraries), a Baby Health Centre built in the 1940’s now a café and a historic rotunda.

Lambton Park is host to many community events including the annual Lambton Park Carols.

=== Beginnings ===
As early as 1871, Lambton Council asked the Minister for Lands to turn part of the Commonage east of Morehead Street into a public park, but the legal uncertainties meant that nothing happened for years.

In 1876, the area that is now Lambton Park started being used as a recreation ground. However, since it wasn’t officially declared a park, the council and locals didn’t want to spend much time or money improving it and in 1878 Council intended to fence the new recreation ground bounded by Morehead Street, Elder Street and Howe Street, to prevent people building houses on it.

By June 1883, frustration had built up. At a public meeting, Mayor Thomas Croudace stepped in to solve the problem, as many people had built homes on the land meant for the park, on behalf of Lambton Colliery. He offered them £100 towards compensation, subdividing the land between Pearson and Kendall streets and selling the allotments for £10 - approximately one third their true value and arranged to move their houses. The offer worked and just two weeks later, the local newspaper reported that houses were being moved with 43 houses relocated.

The land at Lambton was dedicated for the purposes of public recreation on 21 May 1887, to be a public park within the meaning of the Public Parks Act of 1884 and was to be known by the name of Lambton Park.

Thomas Croudace’s key role is remembered with an inscription on the park gates, which were put up in 1918 on Morehead Street.

=== Lambton Rotunda ===
In December 1889, Alderman W.T. Dent proposed building a rotunda in Lambton Park. It was originally planned for the corner of Morehead and Howe streets, but noise from trams on Howe Street made that spot unsuitable. Instead, it was built further into the park, in line with Pearson Street.

The rotunda was completed in September 1890 by contractor Timothy Boyle, costing £361. Its official opening was delayed due to a miner’s strike and finally took place on Saturday, 29 November 1890. The event featured a brass band and Northumbrian sword dancing. In the latticework above the Corinthian columns adjoining the entrance steps the words “W.T. Dent, Mayor, Erected 1890”, were placed and remain there today.

By 1925, the rotunda had deteriorated, mostly due to rough use. Newcastle Council later restored it to its original design, including the iron railings, wooden floor, dome, and spire.

At the base of the rotunda is a plaque marking the ‘Birth of Soccer Football in Newcastle’. It refers to an 1885 match between two teams representing south of Lambton (Hamilton area) and north of Lambton (Minmi area). However, newer research shows the first official game in the region was actually between the Lambton Thistles and the Caledonians from Sydney, played at the same location.

=== Lambton Park Memorial Gates ===
On the western side of Lambton Park, opposite Peason Street a four pillared stone ceremonial gate is located.

In September 1915, with the Great War underway, Henry Burg and Thomas Pease convened a public meeting to form a committee dedicated to farewelling departing soldiers and welcoming home the wounded.

In January 1917, Mayor Edward Charlton announced plans to build memorial gates in Lambton Park as a Roll of Honour. Architect Eric G Yeomans volunteered his services, and on 19 October 1918, a foundation stone was laid before a large crowd. MP J Estell placed a bottle into the cement containing committee names, a 1914 newspaper, and old coins, then received a gilt trowel from the Mayor. The war ended three weeks later, allowing the gates to bear the final year and the names of 140 local soldiers, with fallen soldiers marked by an asterisk.

In 2017, two bronze kangaroos which were originally on the gates were restored and dedicated on ANZAC Day 2017.

On 20 October 2018 the Lambton Time Capsule Ceremony was held by the City of Newcastle to commemorate the rediscovery of an original 1918 time capsule under the Lambton Park Memorial Gates, and to reinter a new 2018 time capsule for the next one hundred years to be opened in 2118.

=== Lambton Park War Memorial Swimming Centre ===
On 26 January in 1963 that Lambton Park War Memorial Swimming Centre officially opened. The centre was opened in a formal ceremony performed by Lord Mayor of Newcastle Alderman F. J. Purdue. The facilities were developed and financed by Newcastle City Council with assistance from Newcastle War Memorial Olympic Pool Committee and the Joint Coal Board.

It was the Newcastle’s first inland swimming pool, built in memory of all of those who have served in all conflicts. A metal dedication plaque with gold incised lettering is situated on the outside of the building.

The centre is located on Durham Road between Hobart Road and Karoola Road, Lambton. An average of 184,000 people visit the popular facility annually. The pool consists of a heated 50-metre pool, learners and toddlers pool, diving pool with a diving tower, water slide, splash park, spectator grandstand and grassed areas. On 17 December 2023 a new $2.2 million grandstand was opened capable of hosting 800 people.

== Places of Interest ==
=== Council Chambers / Library ===
In 1872, Lambton Council applied to the Minister for Lands for a parcel of land at the end of Dickson Street to build council chambers. The request was granted and the Council estimated the probable cost of the chambers to be £200. Limited finances however meant that construction did not proceed. In 1884, the government took back the land to use for police barracks and a lockup.

The push for new council chambers was renewed in 1887, when Alderman Kerr moved “That plan and specification be prepared for a wooden building suitable for council-chambers, cost not to exceed £200.” A weatherboard building was quickly built in Lambton Park, costing £270. It officially opened on 21 July 1887. The last Lambton Council meeting was held there on 29 March 1938, when Greater Newcastle Council was formed.

In 1942, the building was turned into a recreation hall for soldiers and named “The Lambton Citizens All Services Recreation Hall.”

The building became the Lambton branch library in February 1950, and in 2022 the front of the building was restored to its original heritage look.

=== Mechanics Institute ===
First opened in Howe Street in 1867 by Thomas Croudace. In 1885 a second weatherboard hall was built with a reading and billiards room. In 1894 a stone and brick building built and institute moved to Elder street at a cost of £573 with a library and games room on the ground floor with a bigger reading room on the upper floor. The committee rented the Howe street space to various organisations until August 1903. In 1950 Newcastle opened a library across the road from the institute which lost them huge membership numbers. The building is now the home to the Newcastle Family History Society and MG Car Club. In 2018, New South Wales State Government gave a grant of $45,000 to re paint the exterior.

=== Lambton Post and Telegraph Office ===
The Lambton Post and Telegraph Office was a postal facility located at the corner of Dickson and Morehead Streets in Lambton. Constructed over an eighteen-month period, the building officially opened in 1884. The structure was designed in the Victorian Italianate architectural style, characteristic of many public buildings erected in the late 19th century.

Postal services in Lambton had commenced prior to 1871, with Daniel Jones serving as the town’s first postmaster. Telegraphic services were introduced in 1875, and by 1884, both postal and telegraphic operations were consolidated within the newly completed Post and Telegraph Office.

In 1997, the Lambton postal business was relocated to Elder Street, and the original building was subsequently sold. The Lambton Post Office ceased operations entirely in 2024.

=== Skyline drive-in theatre ===
The Skyline drive-in theatre was in an area between Croudace Street and Newcastle Road, accessed from Barellan Road. The land was formerly owned by the Scottish and Australian Mining Company who established Lambton colliery in 1863.

In 1955, Provincial Gardens Pty Ltd, a company controlled by Hoyts and Union Theatres, purchased the land and applied to open the first drive-in theatre in NSW. Constructed in 1956 at a cost of £200,000, the theatre’s 15 acres catered for 720 cars.

The Skyline opened on 17 October 1956 with a screening of Three Coins in the Fountain and, on 26 June 1985, it closed with a screening of Porky’s Revenge! and Night Patrol.

The site remained vacant, derelict and vandalised for several years, and a fire destroyed the main building. In the 1990s the area was redeveloped for housing with the site now home to residents of Drysdale Drive, Rees Way, Robinson Avenue, and Nolan Place.

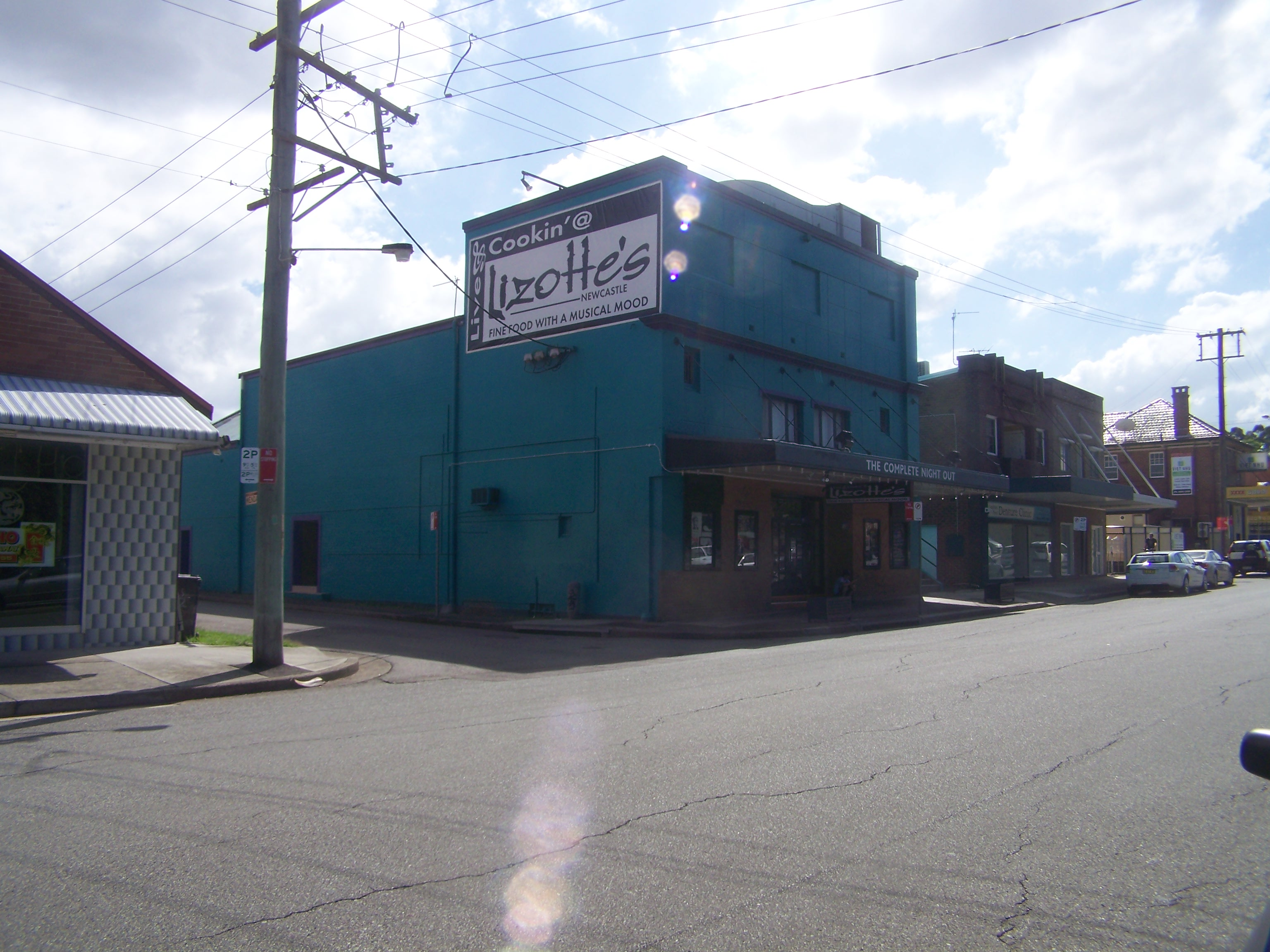
Coronation Hall, now called Flamingos Live.

=== Coronation Hall ===
In May 1911, the proprietor of the Northumberland Hotel, George Smith, invited tenders for “the erection and completion of large brick hall in Morehead St.” His building opened in December 1911 as the Coronation Hall, in honour of the coronation that year of Britain’s King George V. In 1968, the then owner, Warren Murnane, changed the name to Kings Theatre. In 2009 Brian and Jo Lizotte, renamed the venue Lizotte’s with a unique concept of live music and dinner, where it hosted numerous Australian and international artists like Mick Fleetwood, Jimmy Barnes and Kasey Chambers with Brian's brother Mark Lizotte (Diesel) frequently performing there. Listed for sale in 2022 Wayne Rogers and James Hingston, officially took over in November 2023 renaming it Flamingos Live in 2024.

== Education ==
- Lambton High School is a co-ed government high school established in 1974, located on Young Road.
- Lambton Public School is a co-ed government primary school established in 1865, located on Croudace Street.
- St John's Primary School is a co-ed catholic primary school established in 1883, located on Dickinson Street.

== Sports ==
Lambton has played an important part in the sporting history of the Hunter Region.

=== Soccer ===
The Lambton Thistles holds the distinction of being the first football club in Northern New South Wales, having been established in 1885. According to a report in the Maitland Mercury and Hunter River General Advertiser dated Saturday, 13 June 1885, a club operating under British Association rules began at Lambton. On the same day, the club played its inaugural match against the Caledonians from Sydney on Lambton Reserve.

Despite this promising start, the Lambton Thistles were short lived. Their existence spanned only the year 1885, during which they played just two games.

Football activity in Lambton saw a revival in 1924, when the newly established Lambton Soccer Club fielded a C Grade team. The growth continued with the formation of the East Lambton Rangers Soccer Football Club in 1933. This club played its matches at Johnson Park, located on Wyong Road, and was active during the 1933 and 1934 seasons.

After a brief hiatus, the East Lambton Rangers were revived in 1940, but their renewed efforts lasted only until the conclusion of the 1941 season. Notably, the club’s colours were blue and gold, distinguishing them from other teams in the region.

In 1957 Lambton Soccer Club, was established and officially became known as the Jaffas in 1978 to differentiate it from the new All Age senior teams, though the name also referred to the junior club.

Since 2013 the Lambton Jaffas seniors club has played in NNSW NPL the highest level of football in NNSW.

=== Rugby League ===
Newcastle rugby league football club "Western Suburbs Rosella's" foundation meeting was at Smith's Pub (later known as "The Snake Gully" and "Bar 121") when players from Lambton Rugby Union Club (the Maroons), and New Lambton Rugby Union Club (the Greens) merged.

=== Cricket ===
Lambton Cricket club existed until the amalgamation of Lambton and New Lambton Cricket Clubs, becoming Lambton-New Lambton District Cricket Club in 1926–27. In 2004–05 the membership voted to change the club’s name to Western Suburbs District Cricket Club.

=== Australian Rules ===
Lambton also had an Australian Rules club from 1883–1887 which competed with other Newcastle Clubs and those at Maitland. They played on what was then the Lambton Recreation Reserve.

=== Water Polo ===
The Hunter Hurricanes Water Polo Club uses Lambton pool as its home and competes in the Australian Water Polo League (AWL), Australia’s premier domestic water polo competition.

== Hotels and Clubs ==
The area of Lambton Municipal Council (1871–1938), which included parts of North Lambton and Jesmond has been home to numerous hotels with a peak of 16 hotels in 1881.

Lambton Arms Hotel	Gold Miners’ Arms Hotel	Northumberland Hotel
Rose and Crown Inn	Prince of Wales Hotel	Red Lion Inn
Marquis of Lorne Hotel	Pine Apple Hotel	Jesmond Hotel
Coal Miners’ Home Hotel	Miners’ Arms Hotel	Royal Oak Hotel
Northern Star Hotel	Commercial Hotel (1)	Exchange Hotel
Reservoir Hotel	The Rose, Thistle & Shamrock Inn	Lancashire Arms Hotel
Race Horse Inn	Marquis of Midlothian	Royal Hotel
Commercial Hotel (2)	Welcome Home Inn	

Currently there are three hotels still in operation:

Northumberland Hotel (1866–present)

Lambton Park Hotel (1986–present)

- Exchange Hotel (1881–1986)
- Miners Arms Hotel (1877–1881)

The Mark (2008–present)

- Marquis of Lorne (1874–2008)

Lambton Bowling Club was first established as an organization in the year of 1912. In 1913 it became of the first bowling associations in Australia to introduce a women’s only team, to launch into district games. Lambton Bowling Club merged with Club Charlestown in April 2021 to form a new entity and was renamed Club Lambton.

Lambton–New Lambton RSL sub-Branch have been based here since the RSL club closed in 2013.

== Demographics ==
Census year		2001	2006	2011	2016	2021
Population		4,540	4681	5003	4909	5214
Median Age		-	37	37	39	40
Aboriginal or Torres Strait Islander		1.5%	1.8%	2.8%	2.6%	3.6%
Country of Birth	Australia	83.0%	83.1%	82.9%	84.3%	83%
	England	1.9%	1.6%	1.8%	2.1%	1.80%
	North Macedonia	1.4%	1.2%	1%	1.2%	1%
Religious affiliation	No Religion	12.4%	14.1%	20.5%	29.2%	41.7%
	Catholic	27.6%	28.1%	27.4%	24.9%	20.9%
	Anglican	26.5%	25.3%	23.2%	18.8%	14.2%
Median monthly mortgage repayments		-	$1,400	$1,929	$1,509	$1,733
Median weekly rent		-	$200	$260	$305	$360
