= Thomas Whalan =

Australian water polo player

Personal information
- Born: 13 October 1980 (age 45) Sydney, Australia

Sport
- Sport: Water polo
Medal record
Representing Australia
Summer Universiade
Bronze medal – third place	2003 Daegu	Team competition

Thomas Whalan (born 13 October 1980) is an Australian water polo player who competed in the 2000 Summer Olympics, in the 2004 Summer Olympics (Vice-Captain), in the 2008 Summer Olympics (Captain) and in the 2012 Summer Olympics representing Australia in over 350 internationals.

Thomas captained the Aussie Sharks to successive World League Bronze Medals in 2007 & 2008 and was voted by World Water Polo Magazine as one of the world's top defenders.

He competed for the Sydney Uni Water Polo Club in the Australia National Water Polo League winning three titles and for Club Natacio Barcelona in the Spanish League where he was equal highest goalscorer and won the Copa Del Rey in 2003. Thomas competed for Club Atletic Barceloneta where he won the Copa Del Rey 2004, 2010 and League Title in 2010. He played in the Italian League 2005–2009 with SS Nervi (2005-6) and Rari Nantes Savona (2006-2009).

Thomas Whalan served as a director of Water Polo Australia (WPA) 2012-2019 and on 25 November 2017.

== See also ==
- Australia men's Olympic water polo team records and statistics
- List of players who have appeared in multiple men's Olympic water polo tournaments
- List of men's Olympic water polo tournament top goalscorers
