= Tom Hoad Cup =

Former annual international water polo event in Perth, Western Australia

The Tom Hoad Cup was an annual four-day international water polo event, staged in Perth, Western Australia from 2003 to 2012. The event is named for Tom Hoad, a former coach and long-time player for the Australia national water polo team and senior administrator in the international governing body (FINA).

The event is hosted by the Melville Water Polo Club and the competition is played at Bicton Pool.

== Results ==
2011.

- Gold : Partizan Belgrade, Serbia
- Silver : Fremantle Mariners, Australia
- Bronze : Barbarians, Australia
- 4th Place : Japan
- 5th Place : China

2010.

- Gold : Szeged VE, Hungary
- Silver : Fremantle Mariners, Australia
- Bronze : Guangdong, China
- 4th Place : Japan
- 5th Place : Barbarians, Australia

2009.

- Gold : Fremantle Mariners, Australia
- Silver : Barbarians, Australia
- Bronze : Vasas Sport Club, Hungary
- 4th Place : China
- 5th Place : Japan

2008.

- Gold : Barbarians, Australia
- Silver : Fremantle Mariners, Australia
- Bronze : Guangdong, China
- 4th Place : China
- 5th Place : Galatasaray, Turkey
- 6th Place : Tsukuby University, Japan

2007.

- Gold : Australian All Stars
- Silver : Fremantle Mariners, Australia
- Bronze : Partizan Belgrade, Serbia
- 4th Place : Romania
- 5th Place : China

2006.

- Gold : Partizan Belgrade, Serbia
- Silver : Fremantle Mariners, Australia
- Bronze : Brescia, Italy
- 4th Place : China
- 5th Place : South Africa
- 6th Place : NCS Universities, Japan

2005.

- Gold : Fremantle Mariners, Australia
- Silver : BVSC, Hungary
- Bronze : Guangdong, China
- 4th Place : South Africa

2004.

- Gold : Fremantle Mariners, Australia
- Silver : Rari Nantes Florentia, Italy
- Bronze : Guangdong, China
- 4th Place : Croatian Junior National Team

2003.

- Gold : Rari Nantes Florentia, Italy
- Silver : Fremantle Mariners, Australia
- Bronze : Medvescak, Croatia
- 4th Place : Athens Combined Team, Greece
