= Sydney Uni Water Polo Club =

Australian water polo team

Sydney Uni Lions
- League: National Water Polo League
- Based in: Sydney
- Colors
- Head coach: Women: Ian Trent
- Manager: Women: Leanne McKee

Sydney Uni Lions is an Australian club water polo team that competes in the National Water Polo League. They have a men's team and a women's team and are based in Sydney.

== General information ==
The club's colours are blue and gold, and their major sponsor is Sydney University Sports Union. The team's home pool is the Peter Montgomery Pool at the Sydney University Sports Centre.

== Men's team ==
As of 2012, the men's team was coached by Damian Fanning and included Australia men's national water polo team member Thomas Whalan.

== Women's team ==
As of 2012, the team was coached by Ian Trent while Leanne McKee served as the club's manager. Members of the 2011 club who had experience as a members of the Australia women's national water polo team included Elysha O'Neill, Hannah Buckling, Joanne Whitehorn, Keesja Gofers and Alicia Brightwell. The women's team joined the National Water Polo League in 2004. They were semi-finals in the league championships in 2006 and 2007. They were elimination finalists in 2011. In 2011, the team was coached by David Hudson and managed by Bruce Hammond.

The team has a crosstown rival, Cronulla Sharks.

== Notable members ==
- Sienna Green (born 2004), water polo Olympian
