= Nicola Zagame =

Australian water polo player

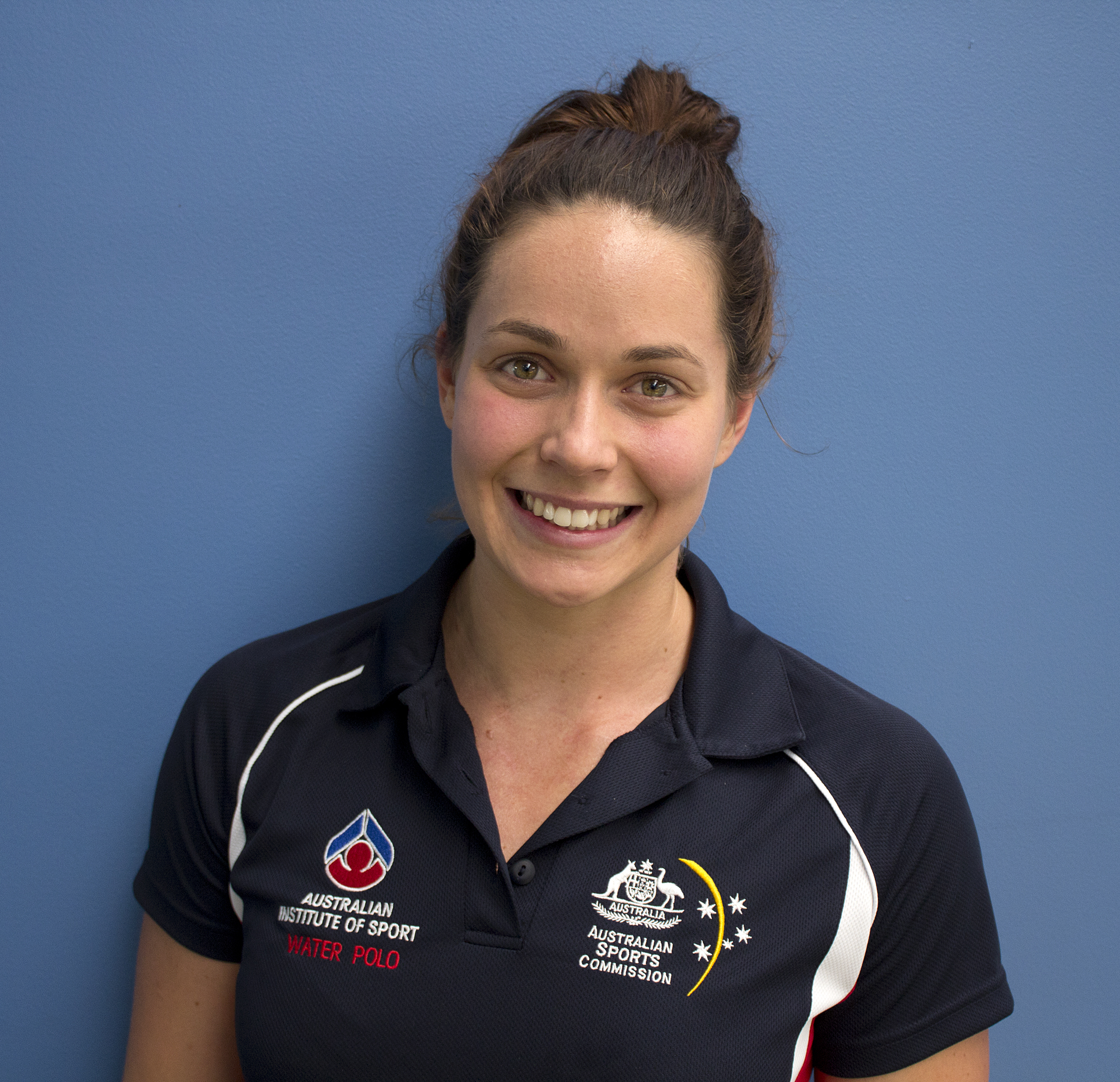

Personal information
- Full name: Nicola Maree Zagame
- Nickname: Ziggy
- Nationality: Australian
- Born: 11 August 1990 (age 36) Sydney, New South Wales
- Height: 174 cm (5 ft 9 in)
- Weight: 73 kg (161 lb)

Sport
- Country: Australia
- Sport: Water polo
- Event: Women's team
- Club: Cronulla Water Polo Club
- Team: Cronulla Sharks
Medal record
Olympic Games
Bronze medal – third place	2012 London	Team competition
World Championships
Silver medal – second place	2013 Barcelona	Team competition
FINA Women's Water Polo World Cup
Silver medal – second place	2010 World Cup	Team competition

Nicola Maree Zagame (born 11 August 1990), nicknamed Ziggy and Nicky, is an Australian water polo centre back/driver. She has represented her country as a member of Australia women's national water polo team on both the junior and senior levels, and was part of the silver winning team at the 2010 FINA Women's Water Polo World Cup. She represented Australia at the 2012 and 2016 Summer Olympics, winning a bronze medal at the 2012 Olympics.

== Personal life ==
Zagame was born on 11 August 1990 in Sydney and grew up attending Kirrawee High School. Currently residing in Gymea Bay, New South Wales, the 174 cm (5 ft 9 in) tall 73 kilograms (161 lb) right handed

Zagame is a water polo coach. In 2017, she flew to Samoa to compete as one of the 24 contestants on Australian Survivor. She came in 6th place.

== Water polo ==
Zagame plays as a centre back/driver and prefers to wear cap number eleven. She keeps a rock that she considers lucky in her pool bag. She started playing water polo as a thirteen-year-old in Sutherland, New South Wales having been recruited from Cronulla SLSC where was involved with surf lifesaving. At the time of her transition to water polo, she was a better surf swimmer than a stillwater swimmer. She has held a scholarship for water polo at the New South Wales Institute of Sport. In 2008, she competed in the Women's International Series.

=== Club team ===
Zagame is a member of and plays club water polo for the Cronulla Sharks Water Polo Club in the National Water Polo League. During the 2009 season, she scored 76 goals. She played for the team in 2010, including the finals tournament, during which she was named in the league final's All Star team. She has twice set season goal-scoring records while playing in the league, with the second time coming in a 2010 game when her team beat Adelaide at home in the Sutherland Leisure Centre. She challenges opposition players in such a way that it frequently results in her fouling out of games. She was the captain of the team during the 2011 season. In 2012, she played briefly with the club before taking a break from the team following their 18 February 2012 game to attend the national team training camp. Her last game before the break was against the Balmain Tigers. As a member of the team, she helped win the first two games of the season 8–4 and 7–4.

=== Junior national team ===
Zagame has represented Australia on the junior national level. In July 2006, she was a member of the Youth Girls squad that competed in an international series in Auckland, New Zealand.

=== Senior national team ===
Zagame is a member of the Australia women's national water polo team, nicknamed the Stingers. She made her senior team debut in May 2009. In 2009, she was part of the Australian side that finished third at the FINA World League Super Finals in Kirishi, Russia. This was her first major international tournament as a member of the senior squad. In 2009, she was part of the team that finished sixth at the FINA World Championships in Rome, Italy in 2009. She was also part of the Australian side that won the 2009 Holiday Cup in the United States.

Zagame was a member of the 2010 Stingers squad that competed at the FINA World Cup in Christchurch, New Zealand where Australia finished second. In the team's quarter finals 10–8 victory over the United States women's national water polo team, she scored three goals. In May 2010, she was a member of the team that competed at the FINA World League Asia-Oceania zone held in Osaka, Japan and Tianjin, China.

Zagame was part of the Australian side that won a silver medal at the 2011 Kirishi Cup in June. In the game for the medal, they played Kazakhstan women's national water polo team. In that match, she scored two goals. In July 2011, she was a member of the Australian Stingers that competed in the 2011 FINA World Championships in Shanghai. In preparation for this tournament, she attended a team training camp in Perth, Western Australia.

In January 2012, Zagame competed in the Pan Pacific Championships for the Stingers, and was a member of the squad that competed in the three-game test series against the United States. The Australian team won two of the three matches, with scores of 12–13 in an opening series loss, winning 11–6 in the second match and winning the third match 12–7 clash at Sutherland Leisure Centre. Zagame scored a goal in the second half of the final match in the series. This test series was the first time she had played an international match in her home swimming pool, Sutherland Leisure Centre.

She was part of the Stingers squad that competed in a five-game test against Great Britain at the AIS in late February 2012. This was the team's first matches against Great Britain's national team in six years. At the 2012 Olympics, Zagame was part of the Australian team that won the bronze medal.

Zagame stayed in the sport and qualified for the 2016 Summer Olympics.

== See also ==
- Australia women's Olympic water polo team records and statistics
- List of Olympic medalists in water polo (women)
- List of World Aquatics Championships medalists in water polo
