= Lambton High School =

School in Newcastle, NSW, Australia

Location
- Lambton, New South Wales; Australia; 32°55′9″S 151°43′14″E

Information
- Type: Government-funded
- Motto: Light The Way
- Established: 1974; 52 years ago
- Educational authority: New South Wales Department of Education
- Principal: Mr James Ostermann
- Years: 7–12
- Enrolment: 1,159 (2024)
- Colours: Royal blue; Orange; Medium Blue
- Website: lambton-h.schools.nsw.gov.au

Lambton High School is a government-funded co-educational comprehensive secondary school, located in the suburb of Lambton in Newcastle, New South Wales, Australia, operated by the New South Wales Department of Education.

The school intake catchment is provided by Lambton Public, New Lambton Public and Wallsend South Public schools. In 2024 the enrolment was 1,159 students.

The school badge features the school colours, alternating blue and orange stripes which fill the shield. The ribbon below the shield states the school motto "Light The Way".

== History ==
Initially the Lambton High School site was earmarked to be the location of East Lambton Public School, however with increased demand for secondary schools in the area the Department of Education decided to change its proposed use. On 26 May 1972 approval was granted for the establishment of a high school at Young and Womboin Roads, Lambton to be known as Lambton High School, the land was then changed in name from East Lambton Public School to Lambton High School. Lambton High opened its doors in 1974 and was a merge of Newcastle Hill Boys High School and Hamilton Girls High School.

== Sport ==
The names of the four sporting houses are

- Bradman, represented by the colour green.
- Freeman, represented by the colour yellow.
- O'Neill, represented by the colour blue.
- Rafter, represented by the colour red.

The school holds positions in events such as basketball, netball and waterpolo.

== Notable events ==
=== Green Day ===
In 1995, the school introduced an annual event called “Green Day,” focused on environmental themes. Students and staff typically wear green clothing, and the day includes activities such as a concert, student and staff performances, competitions, and a costume contest.

=== Community Cabinet ===
On 29 September 2008, the Federal Cabinet (including Prime Minister Kevin Rudd) attended Lambton High School as part of the Australian Government Community Cabinet Program.

=== Medal of the Order of Australia ===
In 2013, Ms Kim Sutherland, former head teacher creative and performing arts and founding musical director of Hunter Singers received the Medal of the Order of Australia (OAM) in recognition of her service and achievement in education.

=== Minister’s Award for Excellence ===
- 2024: Elana Zhang
- 2023: Jovana Markelic, Ryan Robinson
- 2022: Mhairi Hammond, Thomas Muggleton-Ryan
- 2021: Jovana Markelic, Ryan Robinson, Chloe Smith, Alexa Stuart
- 2020: Jacob Carson, Swathy Raveendran
- 2019: Kate Lintott, Dewmi Kavya De Silva Paththini Kankanamge
- 2018: Jacob Carson, Swathy Raveendran
- 2017: Clare Corliss, Monique Rosser
- 2016: Ellie Bright, Andrew Gay
- 2015: Memphis Bourne Blue, Thomas Ellis
- 2013: Caitlin Rosser
- 2012: Ben Brown
- 2011: Jessica Provost, Ashleigh Coburn
- 2010: Alexandra Bradney, Declan Clausen
- 2009: Caitlyn Read, Leah Serafim, Annabel Fleming
- 2008: Courtney Coburn

== Notable alumni ==
- Cheryl Salisbury, former captain of the Australian female national football team, the Matildas
- Sharon Claydon, federal member for Newcastle
- Ben Kantarovski, footballer, Newcastle Jets, A-League
- Michelle Bridges, TV personality, personal trainer and author
- Leah Poulton, cricketer, Australian women's cricket team
- Jessica Malone, Olympian, represented Australia at the 2004 Athens Olympic Games in judo

== See also ==
- List of government schools in New South Wales
- Education in Australia
