= Rebecca Kershaw =

British water polo player

Personal information
- Born: 11 August 1990 (age 35); Lancaster, Great Britain

Sport
- Sport: Water polo

Rebecca Kershaw (born 11 August 1990) is a British water polo player. She competed for Great Britain in the women's tournament at the 2012 Summer Olympics. This was the first ever Olympic GB women's water polo team.
