= Victorian Phoenix Water Polo Club =

Australian water polo club

- Founded: (2021; 5 years ago)
- League: Australian National Water Polo League
- Based in: Melbourne
- Arena: Melbourne Sports and Aquatic Centre
- Website: https://vicphoenixwaterpolo.com/

The Victorian Phoenix Water Polo Club is a Melbourne based Australian water polo club that competed in the Australian National Water Polo League. Established in 2021, the club had a men's team and a women's team.

== History ==
The Victorian Tigers (formerly known as the Richmond Tigers and the Hawthorn Tigers) were a water polo team competing in the Australian National Water Polo League established in 1990. Their success came mostly in the early years of the National League, which they dominated, winning the first four championships. They won the competition in 2010 with a victory over the Drummoyne Devils, 10–8.

They played most of their games at the Melbourne Sports and Aquatic Centre, with a few games at the Hawthorn Aquatic and Leisure centre. The club left the league at the conclusion of the 2013 season.

Then Victorian Seals was a Melbourne based club that competed in the National Water Polo League established in 2014, the club had a men's team and a women's team.

In their first year, both teams qualified for the 2014 NWPL Finals which were held at The Valley Pool in Brisbane. The men's team played in the Grand Final against UNSW Wests Magpies and finished with a silver medal. The women's team finished 5th.

In November 2014, the club received the Club of the Year award at the Water Polo Australia awards dinner.

In their second year, the men's team qualified for the 2015 NWPL Finals which were held at Sydney Olympic Park Aquatic Centre and finished 5th.

In their third year, both teams qualified for the 2016 NWPL Finals which were held at MSAC in Melbourne. The men's team played in their second Grand Final against UWA Torpedoes and finished with a silver medal. The women's team finished 5th.

The club withdrew from the National Water Polo League prior to the start of the 2017 season.

== Honours ==
Honours for Victorian clubs:

=== Victorian Tigers ===
- NWPL Champions 1990, 1991, 1992, 1993, 2010, 2013
- NWPL Bronze Medallist 1995, 2001, 2006
- NWPL Semi-Finalist 1994, 1998,
- NWPL Elimination Finalist 1999, 2000

The women's team finished 4th in the 2009 Finals series, losing the bronze medal match to the Fremantle Marlins by one goal.

== See also ==
- Phoenix (sports team), a list of sports teams named after the mythological phoenix or Phoenix, Arizona
