= UNSW Wests Magpies =

Australian water polo club

University of New South Wales Wests Water Polo Club
- League: National Water Polo League
- Arena: Ashfield Pool and UNSW Pool Randwick
- Colors

The University of New South Wales Wests Water Polo Club is an Australian club water polo team that competes in the National Water Polo League. There is a men's team based at Ashfield and a women's team based at the University of New South Wales. Their men's team is known as the 'Magpies' and their women's team is known as the 'Killer Whales'. This was as a result of merger between the more women's based UNSW Killer Whales club and the more men's based Wests Magpies club. The merger started in 2009 and was officially completed (as we see it today) in 2013.

The Wests Magpies men's national league team were formally known as the West Sydney Sea Hawks from 1997-2001, before adopting the name 'Magpies'.

The club won the women's national league in 2018. The men have been more successful in the national league, taking out premierships in 2008 (before the merger), 2014, 2015, 2017, and 2019.

The also field teams in all junior age groups in the Water Polo NSW Sydney Metropolitan competition.
