= Adelaide Jets =

Australian water polo team

Adelaide Jets Water Polo Club
- League: National Water Polo League (AWL)
- Based in: Adelaide
- Arena: South Australia Aquatic and Leisure Centre

The Adelaide Jets Water Polo Club is an Australian club water polo team that competes in the National Water Polo League. They have a men's team and a women's team and are based in Adelaide.

== Players ==
Men's 2013

NUMBER	NAME	AGE	HEIGHT	WEIGHT	HIGHEST REPRESENTATIVE LEVEL
1	Marshall Morley	28	196	102	AUS
2	Nicholas Martin	20	189	102	AUS
4	Tom Dayman	23	185	103	AUS 20 & Under
5	Scott Carpenter	26	195	92	NWPL
7	George Brettig-Norris	22	196	102	NWPL
8	Dan Hall	18	178	78	AUS Youth
9	Alex Murphy	25	189	96	GBR
10	Tim Martin	29	185	93	NWPL
11	Josh Frost	23	185	87	NWPL
12	Chris Martin	31	185	82	NWPL
13	Jason Wedding	26	185	82	NWPL
14	Henrik Palm	20	188	82	SWE
15	Spencer White	25	197	100	USA Youth
16	Nick Jordan	19	185	72	SA Youth
17	Sam McGregor	29	192	95	AUS
18	Sam Jackson	16	200	110	SA Youth
19	William Dayman	19	194	99	AUS Youth
21	John Thompson	32	200	110	ESP
22	Matt Martin	31	196	120	AUS
