= UWA Torpedoes =

University of Western Australia Torpedoes Water Polo Club
- Founded: 1990
- League: National Water Polo League
- Based in: Perth
- Arena: UWA Aquatic Centre
- Website: Official website

The University of Western Australia Torpedoes Water Polo Club is an Australian club water polo team that competes in the National Water Polo League. They have a men's team and a women's team and are based at University of Western Australia. The UWA torpedoes won their first ever NWPL grand final in 2016.
