= Balmain Water Polo Club =

Australian water polo club

UTS Balmain Tigers Water Polo Club
- Founded: 1884
- League: National Water Polo League
- Based in: Balmain, New South Wales
- Arena: Ryde Aquatic Leisure Centre
- Colours: Orange, Black & White
- Website: http://balmainwaterpolo.com.au/

UTS Balmain Tigers Water Polo Club is an Australian club water polo team that competes in the National Water Polo League. They have a men's team and a women's team and are based in Balmain, New South Wales.

The club have been sponsored by the University of Technology Sydney since 2009.

== See also ==
- Water polo in Australia
- UTS Sport
