= Fremantle Mariners =

Water polo team

Fremantle Mariners Water Polo Club
- League: National Water Polo League
- Based in: Fremantle, Western Australia
- Arena: Melville Water Polo Club
- Head coach: Peter Arancini
- Manager: Wendy Arancini

The Fremantle Mariners is an Australian club water polo team that competes in the Australian National Water Polo League. They are a men's team and are based in Fremantle.
