= Cronulla Sharks Water Polo Club =

Cronulla Sutherland Water Polo Club
- Founded: 1963
- League: Australian Water Polo League
- Based in: Cronulla in Sydney, New South Wales, Australia
- Arena: Sutherland Leisure Centre, Gunnamatta Bay
- Colours: Blue, White, Black
- Head coach: Men: Vedran Cirkovic; Women: Dusan Krstic
- Championships: Men: 5 Women: 3
- Website: https://www.cronullawaterpolo.com.au/

The Cronulla Sutherland Water Polo Club is an Australian club water polo team that competes in the Australian Water Polo League. They have senior men's and women's teams as well as multiple junior teams and are based in the Sydney suburb of Cronulla, New South Wales, Australia.

== Men's Honours ==
=== National titles ===
Australian Water Polo League

- Champions (5): 1994, 1995, 1996, 1997, 1999
- Runners up (5): 1991, 1992, 1993, 2000, 2026
- Bronze Medallist (4): 1998, 2017, 2018, 2023
- Semi-Finalist (1): 2002
- Elimination Finalist (7): 2001, 2003, 2004, 2005, 2016, 2022, 2024

== Women's Honours ==
=== National titles ===
Australian Water Polo League

- Champions (3): 2006, 2012, 2026
- Runners up (2): 2011, 2022
- Bronze Medallist (1): 2016
- Semi-Finalist (1): 2015
- Elimination Finalist (9): 2004, 2005, 2009, 2010, 2017, 2018, 2019, 2023, 2025

== 2026 AWL Squads ==
	Men's AWL Squad	Women's AWL Squad
1	(Australia) Hayden Molla (GK)	(Australia) Claire Durston (GK)
2	(Australia) Ethan Payne	(Hungary) Dora Alaksza
3	(Australia) Jimmy Dickson	(Australia) Nell Payne
4	(Australia) Rory McKell	(Australia) / (United States) Danijela Jackovich
5	(Australia) Sam Rose	(Australia) Allie Davis
6	(Australia) Daniel Kerr	(Australia) Sophie Hankin
7	(Australia) Koby Gilchrist	(Australia) Tayte Headley
8	(Australia) Rhys Holden	(Australia) Ella Fraser
9	(Australia) Maxwell Churchyard	(Australia) Ashlee Rider
10	(Australia) Harrison Teague	(Australia) Emma Putt
11	(Australia) Chaz Poot	(Australia) Jade Vinson
12	(Australia) Rex Palazzi	(Australia) Abbey Simshauser
13	(Australia) Hugo Payne	(United States) Madison Berggren
14	(Australia) Oscar Douglas	(Australia) Grace Welsh
15	(Serbia) Rade Joksimovic	
16	(Serbia) Stefan Brankovic	
17	(United States) Tyler Padua	
18	(Australia) Jax Martin (GK)	(Australia) Kimberly Keane (GK)
19	(Australia) Stefan Despotovic	(Australia) Sabine Moller (GK)
20	(New Zealand) Cole Phillips	
	Coach: (Serbia) / (Australia) Vedran Cirkovic	Coach: (Serbia) / (Australia) Dusan Krstic

== Notable players ==
- Rebecca Rippon
- Nicola Zagame
- Joe Kayes
- Greg McFadden
- Danijela Jackovich
