= Drummoyne Devils =

- Founded: 1904
- League: National Water Polo League
- Based in: Drummoyne, New South Wales
- Arena: Drummoyne Swim Centre
- Colors
- Website: http://www.drummoynewaterpolo.com.au/

The Drummoyne Devils is an Australian club water polo team that competes in the National Water Polo League. They have a men's team and a women's team and are based in Drummoyne, New South Wales.
