= Queensland Thunder =

- Founded: 1963
- League: National Water Polo League
- Based in: Brisbane
- Arena: The Valley Pool
- Colors
- Website: https://www.revolutionise.com.au/qldthunder

The Queensland Thunder is an Australian club water polo team that competes in the National Water Polo League. They have a men's team and a women's team and are based in Brisbane.

The Queensland Thunder was formed in 2018 after a Water Polo Australia review required the two Brisbane based teams – the Queensland Breakers and the Brisbane Barracudas – to form a single entity.

== History ==
=== Brisbane Barracudas ===
Brisbane Barracudas Water Polo club formerly Tugun Water Polo club was Founded in 1963 and played home games at Musgrave Park Swimming Centre.

=== Queensland Breakers ===
Queensland Breakers was Founded in 2003 and played home games at The Valley Pool in Fortitude Valley and won the men's Australian Water Polo League in 2007.

== See also ==
- Water polo in Australia
