= Hunter Hurricanes =

Hunter Hurricanes Water Polo Club
- Founded: 2006
- League: National Water Polo League
- Head coach: Daniel Marsden
- Manager: Mark Robinson
- Website: http://www.hunterhurricanes.com.au/

The Hunter Hurricanes Water Polo Club is an Australian club water polo team that competes in the National Water Polo League. They have a men's team and a women's team and are based in the Hunter Region.
