= Water Polo Australia =

Water polo governing body in Australia

- Sport: Water Polo
- Jurisdiction: Australia
- Abbreviation: WPA
- Founded: 1982
- Affiliation: World Aquatics
- Regional affiliation: Oceania Swimming Association
- Headquarters: Sydney, New South Wales, Australia
- President: Trent Birkett
- Men's coach: Tim Hamill
- Women's coach: Rebecca Rippon

Official website
- www.waterpoloaustralia.com.au
- (Australia)

Water Polo Australia (WPA) is the national governing body for Water Polo in Australia, headquartered in Sydney. WPA in its current form was formed in 1982, when it broke away from the Amateur Swimming Union of Australia (now Swimming Australia) to become the Australian Amateur Water Polo Association (AAWPA). Prior to that time, water polo was administered by a sub-committee of the ASUA. In January 1990 the AAWPA changed its name to 'Water Polo Australia Incorporated'.

Water Polo Australia oversees the men's, women's, and youth national teams in Australia, the national coaching programs, and the seven state governing bodies of the sport. It also conducts the Australian Water Polo League, the country's premier national Water Polo competition, and holds annual national junior club and interstate representative championships.

WPA is governed by a national conference of representatives from all states and territories, which elect six Directors to the WPA Board. Water polo is one of a small number of truly national sports in Australia, with the game being played by both men and women across every state.

== History ==
Behind Great Britain, Australia was the second nation in the world to play the game of water polo. The first known Australian match occurred at St. Kilda Baths, Melbourne on 3 March 1879 and was demonstrated by Professor Fred Cavill, who had only just emigrated from England. Australian men's teams have competed at every Olympic Games Water Polo Tournament since 1948, excepting 1968 (controversially not nominated by the AOC) and 1996 (did not qualify). Australia's women's team, the Aussie Stingers, were the inaugural Olympic gold medallists at the first Women's Olympic Games Water Polo Tournament in Sydney (2000), and have since won two Olympic bronze medals at Beijing (2008) and London (2012).

The first history of the sport in Australia was launched in February 2009, under the title 'Water Warriors: Chronicle of Australian Water Polo', by Dr. Tracy Rockwell. The 592-page publication features over 1,300 images and is an in-depth reference on water polo in Australia from its first match in 1879 to the 2008 Beijing Olympic Games. An updated edition is being planned.

== Administration ==
Water Polo in Australia uses a federated model of national, states and territory governing bodies. A number of local associations and regional zones exist within the states and territories to support the sport's growth and development throughout Australia. Alongside WPA, seven state and territory bodies oversee the conduct of their relevant local and state level competition. They are:

- Water Polo New South Wales
- Water Polo Queensland
- Water Polo Victoria
- Water Polo ACT
- Water Polo South Australia
- Water Polo Western Australia
- Water Polo Tasmania.

== Competitions ==
Water Polo Australia organises and oversees a number of competitions, with state-based competitions organised by the respective state governing authorities.

- Australian Water Polo League
- Australian Youth Water Polo Championships
- National State Championships
- WPA Country Championships
- U13 National Development Carnival

== See also ==
- Australia men's national water polo team
- Australia women's national water polo team
- Australian National Water Polo League
- Water Polo Australia Hall of Fame
