= Australian Water Polo League =

Premier Australian domestic water polo competition

- Formerly: Australian National Water Polo League
- Sport: Water Polo
- First season: 1990
- Organising body: Water Polo Australia
- No. of teams: 10
- Country: Australia
- Most recent champions: Men: UNSW Wests Magpies (9th title); Women: Cronulla Sharks (3rd title) (2026)
- Most titles: Men: UNSW Wests Magpies (9 titles); Women: Fremantle Marlins & Brisbane Barracudas (5 titles)
- Website: https://www.waterpoloaustralia.com.au/wpal-events/ovo-awl

The Australian Water Polo League (formerly known as the Australian National Water Polo League) is the premier Australian domestic water polo competition. The men's league was established in 1990 with the women's league following in 2004. The league is administered by Water Polo Australia, and is contested by 10 clubs, each fielding a women's and a men's team. As of 2026 five clubs are based in Sydney and one each in Melbourne, Brisbane, Fremantle, Newcastle and Perth.

Seasons of the AWL run from January to March and include an 18-round regular season, followed by a finals series playoff involving the six highest-placed teams, which culminates in a grand final match.

== Competition format ==
=== Regular season ===
The regular season runs during the Australian summer, from January to March of each year. The competition consists of 18 rounds, with each team playing every other team twice. Each match sees the teams awarded points based on the following scale:

- Win in Normal Time: four points
- Win in Penalty Shootout: three points
- No result (game cannot be conducted due to uncontrollable factors): two points each
- Loss in Penalty Shootout: one point
- Loss in Normal Time: zero points
- Disqualification/Forfeit: zero points

All games require a result, and as such it is impossible for a game to result in a draw.

At the conclusion of the regular season, the top six placed teams from each of the men's and women's divisions will progress to the finals series, with the position of each team determined by the highest number of points accumulated during the regular season. The remaining four teams are awarded final placings based on the number of points accumulated over the course of the regular season. If two or more teams are level on points, the team which won the game between those two teams will be determined as being higher ranked. If three or more teams are level on points, the following criteria are applied in order until one of the teams can be determined as the higher ranked:

1. The points of the games among the tied teams;
2. The goal difference (excluding goals from a penalty shootout) among the tied teams;
3. Total goals scored among tied teams;
4. The games played between the tied teams;
5. The results against the highest placed team;
6. Toss of a coin.

=== Finals series ===
The top six clubs at the conclusion of the regular season progress to the finals series. The finals series culminates to the Australian Water Polo League grand final, where the winner is crowned AWL champion. The club that wins each grand final is presented with the AWL Champions Trophy.

== Competition venues ==
AWL games are played across a total of 27 approved venues throughout the season. The following venues were accredited for use for the 2026 season.

Pool	Club	Location	Pool Type
New South Wales
Dawn Fraser Baths	UTS Balmain Tigers	Balmain, NSW	Tidal Baths
St Joseph's College	UTS Balmain Tigers	Hunters Hill, NSW	Outdoor
Sutherland Leisure Centre	Cronulla Sharks	Sutherland, NSW	Outdoor
Gunnamatta Bay ^{i}	Cronulla Sharks	Cronulla, NSW	Tidal Baths
Drummoyne Swimming Centre	Drummoyne Devils	Drummoyne, NSW	Outdoor
Lambton Pool	Hunter Hurricanes	Lambton, NSW	Outdoor
Queens Wharf ^{i}	Hunter Hurricanes	Newcastle, NSW	Tidal Baths
Peter Montgomery Pool	Sydney University Lions	Darlington, NSW	Indoor
Shore School	Sydney University Lions	North Sydney, NSW	Indoor
Ashfield Aquatic Centre	UNSW Wests Magpies (M) / Killer Whales (W)	Ashfield, NSW	Outdoor
Sydney Olympic Park Aquatic Centre	Neutral	Sydney Olympic Park, NSW	Indoor
Pymble Ladies' College	Neutral	Pymble, NSW	Indoor
Ryde Aquatic Leisure Centre	Neutral	Ryde, NSW	Indoor
Auburn Ruth Everuss Aquatic Centre	Neutral	Auburn, NSW	Outdoor
Oasis Aquatic Centre	Neutral	Wagga Wagga, NSW	Outdoor
Queensland
Valley Pool	Queensland Thunder	Fortitude Valley, QLD	Outdoor
All Hallows' School	Queensland Thunder	Brisbane, QLD	Outdoor
Stuartholme School	Queensland Thunder	Toowong, QLD	Outdoor
Musgrave Park Swim Centre	Queensland Thunder	South Brisbane, QLD	Outdoor
Kawana Aquatic Centre	Neutral	Bokarina, QLD	Outdoor
Gold Coast Aquatic Centre	Neutral	Southport, QLD	Outdoor
Western Australia
Bicton Baths	Fremantle Mariners (M) / Marlins (W)	Bicton, WA	Outdoor
Perth HPC	UWA Torpedoes	Mount Claremont, WA	Outdoor
University of Western Australia	UWA Torpedoes	Crawley WA	Outdoor
Victoria
Melbourne Sports and Aquatic Centre	Victorian Phoenix	Albert Park, VIC	Indoor/Outdoor
Caulfield Grammar School	Victorian Phoenix	Caulfield, VIC	Indoor
South Australia
Adelaide Aquatic Centre	Neutral	North Adelaide, SA	Indoor

Notes
^{i} Special Event Venue only.

== Current Teams ==
The Australian Water Polo League is contested by 10 clubs from across Australia.

Club	Est.	AWL debut	State/Territory	Location(s)	Championships (Men)		Championships (Women)	
Club	Est.	AWL debut	State/Territory	Location(s)	Total	Last	Total	Last
Cronulla Sharks	1963	1990	New South Wales	(New South Wales) Sydney (Cronulla)	5	1999	3	2026
Drummoyne Devils	1904	2008	New South Wales	(New South Wales) Sydney (Drummoyne)	1	2024	0	—
Fremantle Mariners (M) / Marlins (W)	1946^{1}	1992	Western Australia	(Western Australia) Fremantle	7	2012	5	2014
Hunter Hurricanes	2006	2006	New South Wales	(New South Wales) Newcastle	0	—	0	—
Queensland Thunder	2018	2019	Queensland	(Queensland) Brisbane	0	—	3	2024
Sydney University Lions	1892	1990	New South Wales	(New South Wales) Sydney	4	2018	3	2023
UNSW Wests Magpies (M) / Killer Whales (W)	1965^{2}	1990	New South Wales	(New South Wales) Sydney (Ashfield & Kensington)	9	2026	1	2018
UTS Balmain Tigers	1884	1996	New South Wales	(New South Wales) Sydney (Balmain)	0	—	0	—
UWA Torpedoes	1979^{3}	1990	Western Australia	(Western Australia) Perth	1	2016	0	—
Victorian Phoenix	2021	2022	Victoria	(Victoria (state)) Melbourne	0	—	0	—

Notes
^{1} In 2009, Wests Magpies and UNSW Killer Whales merged to become UNSW Wests Water Polo Club.
^{2} Establishment date of Melville Water Polo Club.
^{3} Establishment date of City Beach Water Polo Club.

=== Former Teams ===
Club	State/Territory	Location(s)	First season	Final season	Also Known As
Adelaide Jets	South Australia	(South Australia) Adelaide	1991	2025	Adelaide/Canberra Jets (2000)
Brisbane Barracudas	Queensland	(Queensland) Brisbane	1990	2018	Brisbane Tugun (2000)
Brisbane Barracudas	Queensland	(Queensland) Brisbane	1990	2018	Brisbane Redbacks (1997 - 1998)
Brisbane Barracudas	Queensland	(Queensland) Brisbane	1990	2018	Brisbane Barracudas (1999 - 2018)
Queensland Breakers	Queensland	(Queensland) North Brisbane	2003	2018	KFC Breakers
Victoria Tigers	Victoria	(Victoria (state)) Richmond, Victoria	1990	2016	Richmond Tigers (1990 - 1995)
Victoria Tigers	Victoria	(Victoria (state)) Richmond, Victoria	1990	2016	VIS Tigers (1996)
Victoria Tigers	Victoria	(Victoria (state)) Richmond, Victoria	1990	2016	Hawthorn Tigers (1997 - 1999)
Victoria Tigers	Victoria	(Victoria (state)) Richmond, Victoria	1990	2016	Victoria Tigers (2000 - 2013)
Victoria Tigers	Victoria	(Victoria (state)) Richmond, Victoria	1990	2016	Victorian Seals (2014 - 2016)
Hobart Hammerheads	Tasmania	(Tasmania) Hobart	2004	2009	
AIS Finns	Australian Capital Territory	(Australian Capital Territory) Canberra	2004	2009	
Canberra Dolphins	Australian Capital Territory	(Australian Capital Territory) Canberra	1990	2006	
Kiwi Stingrays	New Zealand	New Zealand	1999	2003	New Zealand Stingrays (2001-2003)
Singapore	Singapore	Singapore	2002	2002	
Canadian Canucks	Canada	Canada	1999	1999	
Brisbane QWPI	Queensland	(Queensland) Brisbane	1995	1996	
Melbourne Barbarians	Victoria	(Victoria (state)) Melbourne	1990	1992	
Hobart Institute of Sport (TIS)	Tasmania	(Tasmania) Hobart	1990	1990	Hobart Tigers (1990)

== Men's champions ==
As of the conclusion of the 2026 season, nine clubs have won the championship trophy. UNSW Wests Magpies are the most successful men’s AWL club, having won nine championships.

Team	Championships	Year(s) won
UNSW Wests Magpies	9	2008^{a}, 2014, 2015, 2017, 2019, 2022, 2023, 2025, 2026
Fremantle Mariners	7	1998, 2000, 2001, 2006, 2009, 2011, 2012
Victoria Tigers	6	1990^{b}, 1991^{b}, 1992^{c}, 1993^{b}, 2010, 2013
Cronulla Sharks	5	1994, 1995, 1996, 1997, 1999
Sydney University Lions	4	2002, 2003, 2005, 2018
Drummoyne Devils	1	2024
UWA Torpedoes	1	2016
Queensland Breakers	1	2007
Brisbane Barracudas	1	2004
Victorian Phoenix	0	–
Queensland Thunder	0	–
Hunter Hurricanes	0	–
UTS Balmain Tigers	0	–

Notes
^{a} Championship won pre-merger as Wests Magpies.
^{b} Championships won as Richmond Tigers.
^{c} Championship won as VIS Tigers.

== Women's champions ==
As of the conclusion of the 2026 season, six clubs have won the championship trophy. Brisbane Barracudas & Fremantle Marlins are the most successful women's AWL clubs, having won five championships each.

Team	Championships	Year(s) won
Brisbane Barracudas	5	2009, 2010, 2011, 2013, 2015
Fremantle Marlins	5	2004, 2005, 2007, 2008, 2014
Queensland Thunder	4	2019, 2022, 2024, 2025
Cronulla Sharks	3	2006, 2012, 2026
Sydney University Lions	3	2016, 2017, 2023
UNSW Wests Killer Whales	1	2018
UWA Torpedoes	0	–
Victorian Phoenix	0	–
Hunter Hurricanes	0	–
Drummoyne Devils	0	–
UTS Balmain Tigers	0	–

== See also ==
- Water polo in Australia
