= Australia at the 2012 Summer Olympics =

- IOC code: AUS
- NOC: Australian Olympic Committee
- Website: www.olympics.com.au

in London
- Competitors: 410 in 23 sports
- Flag bearers: Lauren Jackson (opening); Malcolm Page (closing)
- Medals Ranked 8th: Gold 8 Silver 15 Bronze 12 Total 35

Summer Olympics appearances (overview)
- 1896; 1900; 1904; 1908; 1912; 1920; 1924; 1928; 1932; 1936; 1948; 1952; 1956; 1960; 1964; 1968; 1972; 1976; 1980; 1984; 1988; 1992; 1996; 2000; 2004; 2008; 2012; 2016; 2020; 2024; 2028

Other related appearances
- 1906 Intercalated Games –––– Australasia (1908–1912)

Australia competed at the 2012 Summer Olympics in London, from 27 July to 12 August 2012. Australian athletes have competed in every Summer Olympic Games of the modern era. The Australian Olympic Committee sent a total of 410 athletes to the Games to compete in 23 sports.

Australia left London with a total of 35 medals (7 gold, 16 silver, and 12 bronze), the lowest in Summer Olympics since 1992. Ten of these medals were awarded to the athletes in swimming, including the gold from the women's freestyle relay team; six in cycling, five in rowing, and four in sailing. Nine Australian athletes won more than a single Olympic medal in London, while 11 of them managed to claim their Olympic titles for the first time. From the twenty-three sports played by the athletes, fourteen of them contained at least a single Olympic medal. With the absence of baseball and softball at the Olympics, Australia's team-based athletes proved successful in London, as the field hockey teams and the women's basketball team each won bronze medals. For the first time since 2000, Australia did not win an Olympic gold medal in rowing.

Among the nation's medalists were sailor Malcolm Page, who successfully defended his Olympic title in the men's 470 class, and hurdler Sally Pearson, who became the first Australian female athlete to win gold in athletics after 12 years. Anna Meares, who won gold and bronze in London, became one of the most successful track cyclists in history, with a total of five Olympic medals. Meanwhile, Leisel Jones, who competed at her fourth Olympics, emerged as the greatest Australian female swimmer in history, with a total of nine Olympic medals, including one from London.

On 17 June 2016, the eighth gold medal was awarded to Jared Tallent in the 50 kilometres walk, after the disqualification of Russian Sergey Kirdyapkin due to doping.

== Medalists ==
Medal	Name	Sport	Event	Date
Gold	Cate Campbell; Alicia Coutts; Brittany Elmslie; Yolane Kukla^{*} Melanie Schlanger; Emily Seebohm*; Lisbeth Trickett*	Swimming	Women's 4 × 100 m freestyle relay	28 July
Gold	Tom Slingsby	Sailing	Laser class	6 August
Gold	Anna Meares	Cycling	Women's sprint	7 August
Gold	Sally Pearson	Athletics	Women's 100 m hurdles	7 August
Gold	Iain Jensen; Nathan Outteridge	Sailing	49er class	8 August
Gold	Jacob Clear; David Smith; Tate Smith; Murray Stewart	Canoeing	Men's K-4 1000 m	9 August
Gold	Malcolm Page; Mathew Belcher	Sailing	Men's 470 class	10 August
Gold	Jared Tallent	Athletics	Men's 50 km walk	11 August
Silver	Christian Sprenger	Swimming	Men's 100 m breaststroke	29 July
Silver	Emily Seebohm	Swimming	Women's 100 m backstroke	30 July
Silver	Alicia Coutts	Swimming	Women's 200 m individual medley	31 July
Silver	Kate Hornsey; Sarah Tait	Rowing	Women's coxless pair	1 August
Silver	James Magnussen	Swimming	Men's 100 m freestyle	1 August
Silver	Angie Bainbridge*; Bronte Barratt; Alicia Coutts; Brittany Elmslie*; Blair Evans*; Jade Neilsen*; Kylie Palmer; Melanie Schlanger	Swimming	Women's 4 × 200 m freestyle relay	1 August
Silver	Jessica Fox	Canoeing	Women's slalom K-1	2 August
Silver	Kim Crow; Brooke Pratley	Rowing	Women's double sculls	3 August
Silver	Jack Bobridge; Rohan Dennis; Michael Hepburn; Glenn O'Shea	Cycling	Men's team pursuit	3 August
Silver	James Chapman; Drew Ginn; Josh Dunkley-Smith; Will Lockwood	Rowing	Men's coxless four	4 August
Silver	Alicia Coutts; Brittany Elmslie*; Leisel Jones; Melanie Schlanger; Emily Seebohm	Swimming	Women's 4 × 100 m medley relay	4 August
Silver	Mitchell Watt	Athletics	Men's long jump	4 August
Silver	Brittany Broben	Diving	Women's 10 m platform	9 August
Silver	Sam Willoughby	Cycling	Men's BMX	10 August
Silver	Olivia Price; Nina Curtis; Lucinda Whitty	Sailing	Elliott 6m	11 August
Bronze	Alicia Coutts	Swimming	Women's 100 m butterfly	29 July
Bronze	Bronte Barratt	Swimming	Women's 200 m freestyle	31 July
Bronze	Kaarle McCulloch; Anna Meares	Cycling	Women's team sprint	2 August
Bronze	Karsten Forsterling; James McRae; Chris Morgan; Daniel Noonan	Rowing	Men's quadruple sculls	3 August
Bronze	Erin Densham	Triathlon	Women's triathlon	4 August
Bronze	Kim Crow	Rowing	Women's single sculls	4 August
Bronze	Tommaso D'Orsogna*; James Magnussen; Brenton Rickard*; Christian Sprenger; Hayden Stoeckel; Matt Targett	Swimming	Men's 4 × 100 m medley relay	4 August
Bronze	Shane Perkins	Cycling	Men's sprint	6 August
Bronze	Annette Edmondson	Cycling	Women's omnium	7 August
Bronze	Australia women's national water polo team: Victoria Brown; Gemma Beadsworth; Sophie Smith; Holly Lincoln-Smith; Jane Moran; Bronwen Knox; Rowena Webster; Kate Gynther; Glencora Ralph; Ashleigh Southern; Melissa Rippon; Nicola Zagame; Alicia McCormack	Water polo	Women's tournament	9 August
Bronze	Australia men's national field hockey team: Mark Knowles (C); Jamie Dwyer (VC); Liam de Young (VC); Simon Orchard; Glenn Turner; Chris Ciriello; Matthew Butturini; Russell Ford; Eddie Ockenden; Joel Carroll; Matthew Gohdes; Tim Deavin; Matthew Swann; Nathan Burgers; Kieran Govers; Fergus Kavanagh	Field hockey	Men's tournament	11 August
Bronze	Australia women's national basketball team: Lauren Jackson (C); Jenna O'Hea; Samantha Richards; Jennifer Screen; Abby Bishop; Suzy Batkovic; Kathleen MacLeod; Kristi Harrower; Laura Summerton; Belinda Snell; Rachel Jarry; Liz Cambage	Basketball	Women's tournament	11 August

Medals by sport
Sport	1st place, gold medalist(s)	2nd place, silver medalist(s)	3rd place, bronze medalist(s)	Total
Sailing	3	1	0	4
Athletics	2	1	0	3
Swimming	1	6	3	10
Cycling	1	2	3	6
Canoeing	1	1	0	2
Rowing	0	3	2	5
Diving	0	1	0	1
Triathlon	0	0	1	1
Water polo	0	0	1	1
Field hockey	0	0	1	1
Basketball	0	0	1	1
Total	8	15	12	35

Medals by gender
Gender	1st place, gold medalist(s)	2nd place, silver medalist(s)	3rd place, bronze medalist(s)	Total
Female	3	9	8	20
Male	5	6	4	15
Mixed	0	0	0	0
Total	8	15	12	35

Medals by date
Date	1st place, gold medalist(s)	2nd place, silver medalist(s)	3rd place, bronze medalist(s)	Total
28 July	1	0	0	1
29 July	0	1	1	2
30 July	0	1	0	1
31 July	0	1	1	2
1 August	0	3	0	3
2 August	0	1	1	2
3 August	0	2	1	3
4 August	0	3	3	6
5 August	0	0	0	0
6 August	1	0	1	2
7 August	2	0	1	3
8 August	1	0	0	1
9 August	1	1	1	3
August 10	1	1	0	2
August 11	1	1	2	4
August 12	0	0	0	0
Total	8	15	12	35

^{*} – Indicates the athlete competed in preliminaries but not the final relay.

== Delegation ==
The Australian Olympic Committee selected a team of 410 athletes, 224 men and 186 women, to compete in 23 sports; it was the nation's fifth largest team sent to the Olympics, but the smallest since the 1992 Summer Olympics in Barcelona. 227 Australian athletes had competed at their first Games, including freestyle swimmer and pre-Olympic favorite James Magnussen, and slalom kayaker Jessica Fox.

The Australian team featured twelve defending Olympic champions, including swimmer Stephanie Rice, who won a total of three Olympic gold medals, pole vaulter Steve Hooker, who broke an Olympic record in Beijing, and diver Matthew Mitcham, who won a gold medal for the first time in men's platform. Equestrian eventing rider Andrew Hoy became the first Australian athlete in history to participate in seven Olympic Games. Three athletes made their sixth Olympic appearance: road cyclist Stuart O'Grady, and trap shooters Michael Diamond and Russell Mark. Beach volleyballer and two-time Olympic medalist Natalie Cook became the first Australian female athlete to compete at five Olympic Games. Dressage rider Mary Hanna, at age 57, was the oldest athlete of the team, while diver Brittany Broben was the youngest at age 16.

Former Olympic rowing champion Nick Green served as Australia's chef de mission. Basketball player Lauren Jackson, who led her team by winning the silver medal in her three consecutive Olympics, became Australia's first female flag bearer at the opening ceremony since 1992.

Australia did not qualify teams in football, women's indoor volleyball, handball and fencing. There was only a single competitor in men's artistic gymnastics, rhythmic and trampoline gymnastics, and wrestling. Athletics was the nation's largest team by sport, with a total of 52 competitors.

The following is the list of number of competitors participating in the Games. Note that reserves in fencing, field hockey, football, and handball are not counted as athletes:

Sport	Men	Women	Total
Archery	1	1	2
Athletics	34	18	52
Badminton	2	3	5
Basketball	12	12	24
Boxing	10	1	11
Canoeing	13	7	20
Cycling	17	12	29
Diving	3	7	10
Equestrian	6	6	12
Field hockey	16	16	32
Gymnastics	2	6	8
Judo	5	1	6
Modern pentathlon	1	1	2
Rowing	27	19	46
Sailing	6	7	13
Shooting	10	7	17
Swimming	23	24	47
Synchronized swimming	0	9	9
Table tennis	3	3	6
Taekwondo	1	1	2
Tennis	2	4	6
Triathlon	3	3	6
Volleyball	12	4	16
Water polo	13	13	26
Weightlifting	1	1	2
Wrestling	1	0	1
Total	224	186	410

== Archery ==
Australia qualified two archers.

Athlete	Event	Ranking round		Round of 64	Round of 32	Round of 16	Quarterfinals	Semifinals	Final / BM	
Athlete	Event	Score	Seed	Opposition Score	Opposition Score	Opposition Score	Opposition Score	Opposition Score	Opposition Score	Rank
Taylor Worth	Men's individual	668	23	Wills (GBR) (42); W 6–5	Ellison (USA); W 7–1	Dai Xx (CHN); L 5–6	Did not advance			
Elisa Barnard	Women's individual	601	58	Christiansen (DEN) (7); L 3–7	Did not advance					

== Athletics ==
Australia sent its second largest team from the track and field to the Olympics outside the host nation. A total of 52 track and field athletes were selected to the team, after having achieved the required qualifying standards in their respective events (up to a maximum of three athletes in each event at the "A" standard, and one at the "B" standard). Pole vaulter, defending Olympic champion, and current Olympic record holder Steve Hooker was appointed as the team captain; however, he missed out of the medal standings and lost his Olympic record to France's Renaud Lavillenie, after failing to clear the height in the finals.

Australia left London with a total of three track and field medals at the Olympics. Sprint hurdler and pre-Olympic favorite Sally Pearson became the first woman to win the nation's gold medal in the track and field since Cathy Freeman in 2000. Long jumper Mitchell Watt, competing at his first Olympics, became the fourth man to claim the silver medal in that event. Jared Tallent was initially presented with the silver medal for the men's 50 km race walk, matching the silver medal he won four years earlier in Beijing, but he was subsequently awarded the gold medal for the London event after Russia's Sergey Kirdyapkin was stripped of his first-place finish after being found guilty of doping. Tallent was presented with his gold medal for the London 50 km (31 mi) race at a ceremony held in Melbourne on 17 June 2016.

Key

- Note–Ranks given for track events are within the athlete's heat only
- Q = Qualified for the next round
- q = Qualified for the next round as a fastest loser or, in field events, by position without achieving the qualifying target
- NR = National record
- N/A = Round not applicable for the event
- Bye = Athlete not required to compete in round

Men
Track & road events

Athlete	Event	Heat		Semifinal		Final	
Athlete	Event	Result	Rank	Result	Rank	Result	Rank
Youcef Abdi	3000 m steeplechase	8:29.81	6	—N/a		Did not advance	
Luke Adams	50 km walk	—N/a				3:53:41	26
Collis Birmingham	5000 m	13:50.39	16	—N/a		Did not advance	
Brendan Cole	400 m hurdles	49.24	2 Q	49.55	5	Did not advance	
Nathan Deakes	50 km walk	—N/a				3:48:45	22
Martin Dent	Marathon	—N/a				2:14:10	28
Chris Erickson	20 km walk	—N/a				1:24:19	38
Ryan Gregson	1500 m	3:38.54	9 q	3:51.86	12	Did not advance	
Jeffrey Hunt	Marathon	—N/a				2:22:59	63
David McNeill	5000 m	13:45.88	12	—N/a		Did not advance	
Craig Mottram	5000 m	13:40.24	16	—N/a		Did not advance	
Jeff Riseley	800 m	1:46.99	5	Did not advance			
Adam Rutter	20 km walk	—N/a				DNF	
Michael Shelley	Marathon	—N/a				2:14:10	16
Steven Solomon	400 m	45.18	1 Q	44.97	3 q	45.14	8
Ben St. Lawrence	10000 m	—N/a				28:32.67	20
Jared Tallent	20 km walk	—N/a				1:20:02	7
Jared Tallent	50 km walk	—N/a				3:36:53	1st place, gold medalist(s)
Tristan Thomas	400 m hurdles	49.13	4 q	50.55	7	Did not advance	
Anthony Alozie; Andrew McCabe; Isaac Ntiamoah; Josh Ross	4 × 100 m relay	38.17	5 q	—N/a		38.43	7
Brendan Cole; Ben Offereins; Steven Solomon; John Steffensen	4 × 400 m relay	3:03.17	5	—N/a		Did not advance	

- Note: Tim Leathart was selected in the team for the men's 4 × 100 metres relay, but did not compete.

Field events

Athlete	Event	Qualification		Final	
Athlete	Event	Distance	Position	Distance	Position
Jarrod Bannister	Javelin throw	77.38	13	Did not advance	
Henry Frayne	Long jump	7.95	11 Q	7.85	9
Henry Frayne	Triple jump	16.40	17	Did not advance	
Benn Harradine	Discus throw	64.00	9 q	63.59	9
Steve Hooker	Pole vault	5.50	=9 q	NM	—
Scott Martin	Discus throw	62.14	19	Did not advance	
Dale Stevenson	Shot put	19.17	26	Did not advance	
Mitchell Watt	Long jump	7.99	9 Q	8.16	2nd place, silver medalist(s)
Julian Wruck	Discus throw	60.08	28	Did not advance	

Women
Track & road events

Athlete	Event	Heat		Quarterfinal		Semifinal		Final	
Athlete	Event	Result	Rank	Result	Rank	Result	Rank	Result	Rank
Lauren Boden	400 m hurdles	56.27	5 q	—N/a		56.66	8	Did not advance	
Melissa Breen	100 m	Bye		11.34	6	Did not advance			
Zoe Buckman	1500 m	4:07.83	8 q	—N/a		4:05.03	10	Did not advance	
Genevieve LaCaze	3000 m steeplechase	9:37.90	9	—N/a				Did not advance	
Regan Lamble	20 km walk	—N/a						1:30:08	17
Beki Lee	20 km walk	—N/a						1:32:14	28
Kaila McKnight	1500 m	4:13.80	5 Q	—N/a		4:08.44	12	Did not advance	
Sally Pearson	100 m hurdles	12.57	1 Q	—N/a		12.39	1 Q	12.35 OR	1st place, gold medalist(s)
Claire Tallent	20 km walk	—N/a						DSQ	
Jessica Trengove	Marathon	—N/a						2:31:17	39
Lisa Weightman	Marathon	—N/a						2:27:32	17
Eloise Wellings	10000 m	—N/a						32:25.43	21
Benita Willis	Marathon	—N/a						2:49:38	100

Field events

Athlete	Event	Qualification		Final	
Athlete	Event	Distance	Position	Distance	Position
Alana Boyd	Pole vault	4.55	11 Q	4.30	11
Kim Mickle	Javelin throw	59.23	17	Did not advance	
Kathryn Mitchell	Javelin throw	60.11	12 q	59.46	9
Liz Parnov	Pole vault	NM	—	Did not advance	
Dani Samuels	Discus throw	63.97	7 Q	60.40	12

== Badminton ==
Athlete	Event	Group Stage				Elimination	Quarterfinal	Semifinal	Final / BM	
Athlete	Event	Opposition Score	Opposition Score	Opposition Score	Rank	Opposition Score	Opposition Score	Opposition Score	Opposition Score	Rank
Ross Smith; Glenn Warfe	Men's doubles	Cai Y / Fu Hf (CHN); L 11–21, 17–21	Fang C-m / Lee S-m (TPE); L 14–21, 13–21	Kindervater / Schöttler (GER); L 13–21, 14–21	4	—N/a	Did not advance			
Victoria Na	Women's singles	Gu (SIN); L 10–21, 7–21	Fašungová (SVK); W 21–12, 21–18	—N/a	2	Did not advance				
Leanne Choo; Renuga Veeran	Women's doubles	Jauhari / Polii (INA); L 11–21, 22–20, 7–21	Edwards / Viljoen (RSA); W 21–9, 21–7	Ha J-e / Kim M-j (KOR); L 21–7, 21–19	3 Q*	—N/a	Bruce / Li (CAN); L 9–21, 21–18, 18–21	Did not advance		

* Meiliana Jauhari and Greysia Polii initially qualified in the quarterfinal round, but they were disqualified after being found guilty of "not using best efforts" and "conducting oneself in a manner that is clearly abusive or detrimental to the sport" by playing to lose matches in order to manipulate the draw for the knockout stage.

== Basketball ==
Australia qualified a men's and a women's team.

- Men's team event – one team of 12 players
- Women's team event – one team of 12 players

=== Men's tournament ===
Roster

The following is the Australia roster in the men's basketball tournament of the 2012 Summer Olympics.

Australia men's national basketball team – 2012 Summer Olympics roster
Players
Coaches

Pos.	No.	Name	Age – Date of birth	Height	Club
SG	4	Peter Crawford	32 – 6 November 1979	1.93 m (6 ft 4 in)	Townsville Crocodiles
PG	5	Patty Mills	23 – 11 August 1988	1.83 m (6 ft 0 in)	San Antonio Spurs
PG	6	Adam Gibson	25 – 30 October 1986	1.88 m (6 ft 2 in)	Adelaide 36ers
SF	7	Joe Ingles	24 – 2 October 1987	2.03 m (6 ft 8 in)	FC Barcelona Bàsquet
G/F	8	Brad Newley	27 – 18 February 1985	1.99 m (6 ft 6 in)	CB Gran Canaria
SG	9	Matthew Dellavedova	21 – 8 September 1990	1.93 m (6 ft 4 in)	Saint Mary's Gaels
SF	10	David Barlow	28 – 22 October 1983	2.05 m (6 ft 9 in)	CB Murcia
PF	11	Mark Worthington	29 – 8 June 1983	2.02 m (6 ft 8 in)	Radnički Kragujevac
F/C	12	Aron Baynes	25 – 9 December 1986	2.08 m (6 ft 10 in)	Ikaros Kallitheas B.C.
C	13	David Andersen	32 – 23 June 1980	2.12 m (6 ft 11 in)	Fenerbahçe Ülker
PF	14	Matthew Nielsen (C)	34 – 3 February 1978	2.08 m (6 ft 10 in)	BC Khimki
C	15	Aleks Marić	27 – 22 October 1984	2.11 m (6 ft 11 in)	PBC Lokomotiv-Kuban

Head coach

- Brett Brown

Assistant coach(es)

- Andrej Lemanis
- Marty Clarke

Legend

- Club – describes last
  club before the tournament
- Age – describes age
  on 29 July 2012

Group play

Pos	Team	Pld	W	L	PF	PA	PD	Pts	Qualification
1	Russia	5	4	1	400	359	+41	9 (Note: Head-to-head record: Russia 1–0 Brazil)	Quarterfinals
2	Brazil	5	4	1	402	349	+53	9	Quarterfinals
3	Spain	5	3	2	414	394	+20	8 (Note: Head-to-head record: Spain 1–0 Australia)	Quarterfinals
4	Australia	5	3	2	410	373	+37	8	Quarterfinals
5	Great Britain (H)	5	1	4	380	405	−25	6	
6	China	5	0	5	313	439	−126	5	

Source: FIBA archive
Rules for classification: 1) points; 2) head-to-head points; 3) head-to-head goal average; 4) head-to-head number of points scored.
(H) Hosts
Notes:

29 July 2012
11:15

Report

Brazil	75–71	Australia
Scoring by quarter: 19–20, 17–15, 20–14, 19–22
Pts: Barbosa 16; Rebs: three players 7 Asts: Huertas 10		Pts: Mills 20; Rebs: Andersen 8 Asts: Mills, Nielsen 4

Basketball Arena, London
Referees: Guerrino Cerebuch (ITA), Bill Kennedy (USA), Christos Christodoulou (GRE)

31 July 2012
11:15

Report

Australia	70–82	Spain
Scoring by quarter: 19–14, 13–23, 10–26, 28–19
Pts: Ingles 12; Rebs: Andersen 7 Asts: Dellavedova 4		Pts: P. Gasol 20; Rebs: Reyes 12; Asts: three players 3

Basketball Arena, London
Referees: Carl Jungebrand (FIN), Borys Ryschyk (UKR), José Carrion (PUR)

2 August 2012
11:15

Report

Australia	81–61	China
Scoring by quarter: 21–22, 28–11, 12–19, 20–9
Pts: Mills 20; Rebs: Worthington 8 Asts: Ingles 7		Pts: Wang Shipeng 21; Rebs: Yi Jianlian, Wang Zhizhi 12; Asts: Wang Shipeng 3

Basketball Arena, London
Referees: Recep Ankaralı (TUR), Pablo Estévez (ARG), Stephen Seibel (CAN)

4 August 2012
20:00

Report

Great Britain	75–106	Australia
Scoring by quarter: 25–18, 21–18, 14–30, 15–40
Pts: Freeland 16; Rebs: Freeland 7 Asts: Archibald 4		Pts: Mills 39; Rebs: Newley 8 Asts: Ingles, Newley 4

Basketball Arena, London
Referees: Juan Arteaga (ESP), José Carrion (PUR), Robert Lottermoser (GER)

6 August 2012
09:00

Report

Australia	82–80	Russia
Scoring by quarter: 29–20, 17–25, 23–19, 13–16
Pts: Ingles 20; Rebs: Dellavedova 6 Asts: Dellavedova 7		Pts: Kaun 18; Rebs: three players 6 Asts: Khryapa 8

Basketball Arena, London
Referees: Carl Jungebrand (FIN), Luigi Lamonica (ITA), Samir Abaakil (MAR)

Quarter-final

8 August 2012
22:15

Report

United States	119–86	Australia
Scoring by quarter: 28–21, 28–21, 28–28, 35–16
Pts: Bryant 20; Rebs: James 14; Asts: James 11		Pts: Mills 26; Rebs: Ingles 8 Asts: Ingles 6

North Greenwich Arena, London
Referees: Luigi Lamonica (ITA), Fernando Sampietro (ARG), Samir Abaakil (MAR)

=== Women's tournament ===
Roster

The following was the Australia roster in the women's basketball tournament of the 2012 Summer Olympics.

Australia women's national basketball team – 2012 Summer Olympics roster
Players
Coaches

Pos.	No.	Name	Age – Date of birth	Height	Club	Ctr.
F	4	Jenna O'Hea	25 – 6 June 1987	1.85 m (6 ft 1 in)	Dandenong Rangers	(Australia)
G	5	Samantha Richards	29 – 24 February 1983	1.68 m (5 ft 6 in)	Bulleen Boomers	(Australia)
G	6	Jennifer Screen	30 – 19 February 1982	1.80 m (5 ft 11 in)	Adelaide Lightning	(Australia)
C	7	Abby Bishop	23 – 29 November 1988	1.89 m (6 ft 2 in)	Perpignan Basket	(France)
C	8	Suzy Batkovic	31 – 17 December 1980	1.95 m (6 ft 5 in)	Adelaide Lightning	(Australia)
G	9	Kathleen MacLeod	25 – 23 October 1986	1.68 m (5 ft 6 in)	Dandenong Rangers	(Australia)
PG	10	Kristi Harrower	37 – 4 March 1975	1.66 m (5 ft 5 in)	Bendigo Spirit	(Australia)
C	11	Laura Summerton	28 – 13 December 1983	1.91 m (6 ft 3 in)	Geas Basket	(Italy)
F	12	Belinda Snell	31 – 10 January 1981	1.82 m (6 ft 0 in)	CCC Polkowice	(Poland)
F	13	Rachel Jarry	20 – 6 December 1991	1.85 m (6 ft 1 in)	Bulleen Boomers	(Australia)
C	14	Liz Cambage	20 – 18 August 1991	2.03 m (6 ft 8 in)	Tulsa Shock	(United States)
PF	15	Lauren Jackson	31 – 11 May 1981	1.95 m (6 ft 5 in)	Seattle Storm	(United States)

Head coach

- (Australia) Carrie Graf

Assistant coach(es)

- (Australia) Phil Brown
- (Australia) Michele Timms
- (Australia) Peter Buckle

Legend

- Club – describes last
  club before the tournament
- Age – describes age
  on 29 July 2012

Group play

Pos	Team	Pld	W	L	PF	PA	PD	Pts	Qualification
1	France	5	5	0	356	319	+37	10	Quarterfinals
2	Australia	5	4	1	353	322	+31	9	Quarterfinals
3	Russia	5	3	2	314	308	+6	8	Quarterfinals
4	Canada	5	2	3	328	332	−4	7	Quarterfinals
5	Brazil	5	1	4	329	354	−25	6	
6	Great Britain (H)	5	0	5	327	372	−45	5	

Source: [ FIBA archive]
Rules for classification: 1) points; 2) head-to-head points; 3) head-to-head goal average; 4) head-to-head number of points scored.
(H) Hosts

28 July 2012
22:15

Report

Australia	74–58	Great Britain
Scoring by quarter: 16–11, 23–15, 18–16, 17–16
Pts: Jackson 18; Rebs: Batkovic 7 Asts: Richards 4		Pts: Vanderwal, Leedham 11; Rebs: Page 7 Asts: Stafford, Leedham 3

Basketball Arena, London
Referees: Jorge Carrion (PUR), Shoko Sugruro (JPN), Borys Ryschyk (UKR)

30 July 2012
14:30

Report

France	74–70 (OT)	Australia
Scoring by quarter: 11–14, 17–13, 24–24, 13–14, Overtime: 9–5
Pts: Gomis 22; Rebs: Yacoubou 7 Asts: Beikes, Dumerc 2		Pts: Batkovic 17; Rebs: Batkovic 10; Asts: O'Hea 5

Basketball Arena, London
Referees: William Kennedy (USA), Christos Christodoulou (GRE), Peng Ling (CHN)

1 August 2012
14:30

Report

Australia	67–61	Brazil
Scoring by quarter: 15–10, 16–8, 20–22, 16–21
Pts: Jackson 18; Rebs: Cambage 10; Asts: Harrower 5		Pts: Costa 22; Rebs: Dantas 10; Asts: Costa 3

Basketball Arena, London
Referees: Recep Ankarali (TUR), Carl Jungebrand (FIN), Vitalis Gode (KEN)

3 August 2012
11:15

Report

Russia	66–70	Australia
Scoring by quarter: 15–21, 15–11, 18–22, 18–16
Pts: Osipova 15; Rebs: Osipova 9 Asts: Danilochkina 4		Pts: Cambage 17; Rebs: Cambage 10; Asts: O'Hea, Harrower 5

Basketball Arena, London
Referees: Cristiano Maranho (BRA), Fernando Sampietro (ARG), Robert Lottermoser (GER)

5 August 2012
14:30

Report

Canada	63–72	Australia
Scoring by quarter: 10–24, 12–11, 20–12, 21–25
Pts: Smith 17; Rebs: Murphy 5 Asts: Thorburn 5		Pts: Snell 12; Rebs: Jackson 9 Asts: Screen, Harrower 4

Basketball Arena, London
Referees: Felicia Grinter (USA), Oļegs Latiševs (LAT), Snehal Bendke (IND)

Quarter-final

7 August 2012
16:15

Report

Australia	75–60	China
Scoring by quarter: 22–16, 13–20, 20–16, 20–8
Pts: Cambage 17; Rebs: Batkovic 9 Asts: Richards 7		Pts: Ma Zengyu 15; Rebs: Chen Nan 7 Asts: Gao Song 3

Basketball Arena, London
Referees: Oļegs Latiševs (LAT), Elena Chernova (RUS), Carole Delauné (FRA)

Semi-final

9 August 2012
17:00

Report

Australia	73–86	United States
Scoring by quarter: 22–20, 25–23, 12–22, 14–21
Pts: Cambage 19; Rebs: Jackson 17; Asts: Jarry 5		Pts: Taurasi, Charles 14; Rebs: Charles 10; Asts: Charles 4

North Greenwich Arena, London
Referees: Ilija Belošević (SRB), Borys Ryschyk (UKR), Snehal Bendke (IND)

Bronze medal

11 August 2012
17:00

Report

(bronze) Australia	83–74	Russia
Scoring by quarter: 17–16, 21–14, 19–13, 26–31
Pts: Jackson 25; Rebs: Jackson 11; Asts: O'Hea 5		Pts: Hammon 19; Rebs: Vodopyanova 8 Asts: Hammon 4

North Greenwich Arena, London
Referees: Jorge Vázquez (PUR), Felicia Grinter (USA), Shoko Sugruro (JPN)

== Boxing ==
Australia qualified boxers for all of the weight categories in the men's event and one in the women's event.

Men

Athlete	Event	Round of 32	Round of 16	Quarterfinals	Semifinals	Final	
Athlete	Event	Opposition Result	Opposition Result	Opposition Result	Opposition Result	Opposition Result	Rank
Billy Ward	Light flyweight	Veitia (CUB); L 4–26	Did not advance				
Jackson Woods	Flyweight	Brahimi (ALG); L 12–14	Did not advance				
Ibrahim Balla	Bantamweight	Lbida (MAR); W 16^{+}–16 DC	Dalakliev (BUL); L 10–14	Did not advance			
Luke Jackson	Lightweight	Liu Q (CHN); L 7–20	Did not advance				
Jeff Horn	Light welterweight	Choombe (ZAM); W 19–5	Houya (TUN); W 17–11	Berinchyk (UKR); L 13–21	Did not advance		
Cameron Hammond	Welterweight	Hima (NIG); W 13–6	Clayton (CAN); L 11–14	Did not advance			
Jesse Ross	Middleweight	Rahou (ALG); L 11–13	Did not advance				
Damien Hooper	Light heavyweight	Browne (USA); W 13–11	Mekhontsev (RUS); L 11–19	Did not advance			
Jai Opetaia	Heavyweight	—N/a	Mammadov (AZE); L 11–12	Did not advance			
Johan Linde	Super heavyweight	—N/a	Zhang Zl (CHN); L RSC	Did not advance			

Women

Athlete	Event	Round of 16	Quarterfinals	Semifinals	Final	
Athlete	Event	Opposition Result	Opposition Result	Opposition Result	Opposition Result	Rank
Naomi Fischer-Rasmussen	Middleweight	Laurell (SWE); L 17–24	Did not advance			

== Canoeing ==
=== Slalom ===
Australia qualified boats for the following events.

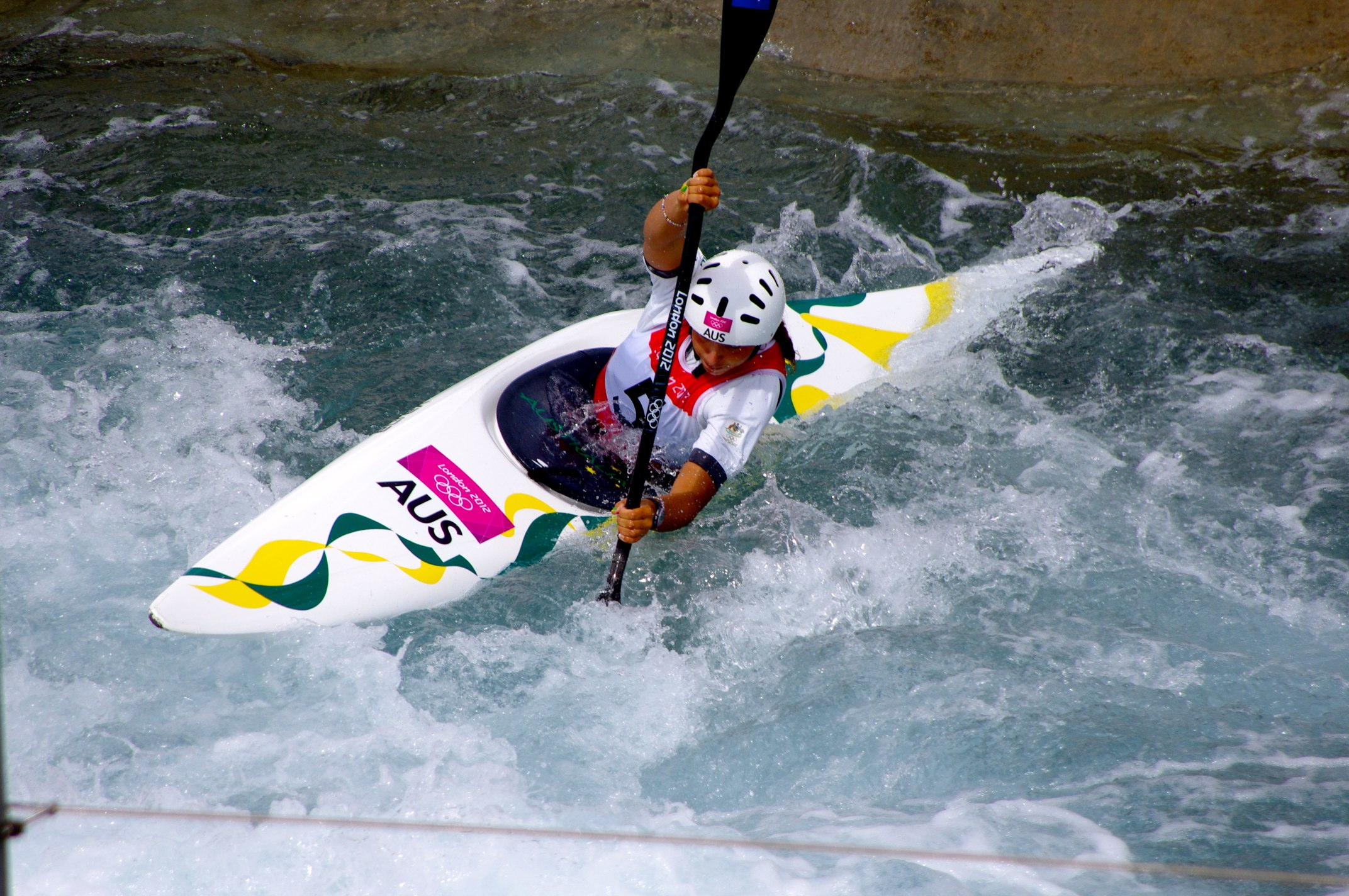
Silver medalist Jessica Fox competing in the Women's K-1 canoe slalom semi-final.

Athlete	Event	Preliminary						Semifinal		Final	
Athlete	Event	Run 1	Rank	Run 2	Rank	Best	Rank	Time	Rank	Time	Rank
Warwick Draper	Men's K-1	95.20	16	95.08	16	95.08	18	Did not advance			
Kynan Maley	Men's C-1	96.07	6	96.68	9	96.07	12 Q	105.49	8 Q	107.08	6
Kynan Maley; Robin Jeffery	Men's C-2	113.96	13	107.47	7	107.47	10 Q	162.14	10	Did not advance	
Jessica Fox	Women's K-1	165.36	18	100.33	2	100.33	4 Q	112.63	8 Q	106.51	2nd place, silver medalist(s)

=== Sprint ===
Australia qualified boats for the following events.

Men

Athlete	Event	Heats		Semifinals		Final	
Athlete	Event	Time	Rank	Time	Rank	Time	Rank
Jake Donaghey	C-1 1000 m	4:21.928	4 Q	4:26.202	6 FB	4:22.005	12
Sebastian Marczak	C-1 200 m	42.845	5 Q	43.441	6	Did not advance	
Murray Stewart	K-1 200 m	37.202	6	Did not advance			
Murray Stewart	K-1 1000 m	3:32.768	6 Q	3:32.975	6 FB	3:40.834	16
Jake Donaghey; Alex Haas	C-2 1000 m	3:52.589	6 Q	3:52.018	5 FB	3:50.782	11
Stephen Bird; Jesse Phillips	K-2 200 m	34.120	4 Q	34.071	4 FA	35.315	6
David Smith; Ken Wallace	K-2 1000 m	3:19.073	2 Q	3:13.239	2 FA	3:11.456	4
Jacob Clear; David Smith; Tate Smith; Murray Stewart	K-4 1000 m	2:59.789	3 Q	2:52.505	1 FA	2:55.085	1st place, gold medalist(s)

Women

Athlete	Event	Heats		Semifinals		Final	
Athlete	Event	Time	Rank	Time	Rank	Time	Rank
Alana Nicholls	K-1 200 m	42.453	2 Q	41.595	4 FB	45.819	16
Alana Nicholls	K-1 500 m	1:53.823	2 Q	1:52.224	5 FB	1:59.033	16
Naomi Flood; Lyndsie Fogarty	K-2 500 m	1:46.554	4 Q	1:45.372	7 FB	1:47.650	12
Jo Brigden-Jones; Hannah Davis; Lyndsie Fogarty; Rachel Lovell	K-4 500 m	1:41.794	6 Q	1:33.671	6	Did not advance	

Qualification Legend: FA = Qualify to final (medal); FB = Qualify to final B (non-medal)

== Cycling ==
Australia qualified cyclists for the following events

=== Road ===
The Australian men's road cycling team consisted of Stuart O'Grady, Cadel Evans, Michael Rogers, Simon Gerrans and Matthew Goss while the women's team was Shara Gillow, Chloe Hosking and Amanda Spratt.

Men

Athlete	Event	Time	Rank
Cadel Evans	Road race	5:46:37	80
Cadel Evans	Time trial	Withdrew	
Matthew Goss	Road race	5:46:37	85
Simon Gerrans	Road race	5:46:37	83
Stuart O'Grady	Road race	5:46:05	6
Michael Rogers	Road race	5:46:37	91
Michael Rogers	Time trial	52:51.39	6

Women

Athlete	Event	Time	Rank
Shara Gillow	Road race	3:37:22	39
Shara Gillow	Time trial	40:25.03	13
Chloe Hosking	Road race	OTL	
Amanda Spratt	Road race	OTL	

=== Track ===
Sprint

Athlete	Event	Qualification		Round 1	Repechage 1	Round 2	Repechage 2	Quarterfinals	Semifinals	Final	
Athlete	Event	Time Speed (km/h)	Rank	Opposition Time Speed (km/h)	Opposition Time Speed (km/h)	Opposition Time Speed (km/h)	Opposition Time Speed (km/h)	Opposition Time Speed (km/h)	Opposition Time Speed (km/h)	Opposition Time Speed (km/h)	Rank
Shane Perkins	Men's sprint	9.987; 72.093	3	Mazquiarán (ESP); W 10.722; 67.151	Bye	Canelón (VEN); W 10.978; 65.585	Bye	Watkins (USA); W 10.520, W 10.263	Baugé (FRA); L, L	Phillip (TRI); W 10.489, W 10.297	3rd place, bronze medalist(s)
Anna Meares	Women's sprint	10.805; 66.635	2	Maeda (JPN); W 11.800; 61.016	Bye	Sullivan (CAN); W 11.566; 62.251	Bye	Shulika (UKR); W 11.465, W 11.573	Guo S (CHN); W 11.683, W 11.284	Pendleton (GBR); W 11.218, W 11.348	1st place, gold medalist(s)

Team sprint

Athlete	Event	Qualification		Semifinals		Final	
Athlete	Event	Time Speed (km/h)	Rank	Opposition Time Speed (km/h)	Rank	Opposition Time Speed (km/h)	Rank
Matthew Glaetzer; Shane Perkins; Scott Sunderland	Men's team sprint	43.377; 62.244	3 Q	China; W 43.261; 62.411	4 Q	Germany; L 43.355; 62.276	4
Anna Meares; Kaarle McCulloch	Women's team sprint	32.825; 54.836	4 Q	Netherlands; W 32.806; 54.868	3 Q	Ukraine; W 32.727; 55.000	3rd place, bronze medalist(s)

Pursuit

Athlete	Event	Qualification		Semifinals		Final	
Athlete	Event	Time	Rank	Opponent Results	Rank	Opponent Results	Rank
Jack Bobridge; Rohan Dennis; Michael Hepburn; Glenn O'Shea	Men's team pursuit	3:55.694	2 Q	New Zealand; 3:54.317	2	Great Britain; 3:54.581	2nd place, silver medalist(s)
Amy Cure; Annette Edmondson; Melissa Hoskins; Josie Tomic	Women's team pursuit	3:19.719	3 Q	United States; 3:16.935	3	Canada; 3:18.096	4

- Note: Alex Edmondson was named on the men's team pursuit squad but did not compete.

Keirin

Athlete	Event	1st Round	Repechage	2nd Round	Final
Athlete	Event	Rank	Rank	Rank	Rank
Shane Perkins	Men's keirin	5 R	3 Q	3 Q	5
Anna Meares	Women's keirin	2 Q	Bye	1 Q	5

Omnium

Athlete	Event	Flying lap		Points race		Elimination race	Individual pursuit		Scratch race	Time trial		Total points	Rank
Athlete	Event	Time	Rank	Points	Rank	Rank	Time	Rank	Rank	Time	Rank	Total points	Rank
Glenn O'Shea	Men's omnium	13.22	3	25	8	3	4:24.811	3	14	1:02.513	3	34	5
Annette Edmondson	Women's omnium	14.261	3	10	11	3	3:35.958	4	1	35.140	2	24	3rd place, bronze medalist(s)

=== Mountain biking ===
Athlete	Event	Time	Rank
Daniel McConnell	Men's cross-country	1:33:22	21
Rebecca Henderson	Women's cross-country	1:41:35	25

=== BMX ===
Athlete	Event	Seeding		Quarterfinal		Semifinal		Final	
Athlete	Event	Result	Rank	Points	Rank	Points	Rank	Result	Rank
Brian Kirkham	Men's BMX	39.610	22	25	7	Did not advance			
Sam Willoughby	Men's BMX	38.496	6	16	3 q	5	1 Q	37.929	2nd place, silver medalist(s)
Khalen Young	Men's BMX	39.304	17	19	4 q	25	8	Did not advance	
Caroline Buchanan	Women's BMX	38.434	1	—N/a		4	1 Q	38.903	5
Lauren Reynolds	Women's BMX	40.045	9	—N/a		19	8	Did not advance	

== Diving ==
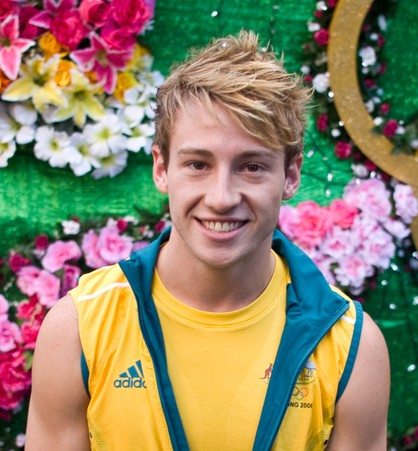
Matthew Mitcham failed to defend his 2008 gold medal in the men's 10 metre platform event.

Men

Athlete	Event	Preliminaries		Semifinals		Final	
Athlete	Event	Points	Rank	Points	Rank	Points	Rank
Ethan Warren	3 m springboard	441.5	15 Q	456.85	11 Q	488.95	7
James Connor	10 m platform	427.45	20	Did not advance			
Matthew Mitcham	10 m platform	457.20	9 Q	482.40	13	Did not advance	

Women

Athlete	Event	Preliminaries		Semifinals		Final	
Athlete	Event	Points	Rank	Points	Rank	Points	Rank
Jaele Patrick	3 m springboard	289.65	18 Q	315.60	11 Q	309.40	11
Sharleen Stratton	3 m springboard	342.70	5 Q	327.60	9 Q	345.65	5
Brittany Broben	10 m platform	339.80	4 Q	359.55	3 Q	366.50	2nd place, silver medalist(s)
Melissa Wu	10 m platform	337.90	5 Q	355.60	4 Q	358.10	4
Anabelle Smith; Sharleen Stratton	3 m synchronised springboard	—N/a				304.95	5
Rachel Bugg; Loudy Wiggins	10 m synchronised platform	—N/a				323.55	4

== Equestrian ==
Australia qualified a team for the show jumping event based on their performance at the 2010 World Equestrian Games. Australia also qualified a team in dressage and eventing.

=== Dressage ===
Athlete	Horse	Event	Grand Prix		Grand Prix Special		Grand Prix Freestyle		Overall	
Athlete	Horse	Event	Score	Rank	Score	Rank	Technical	Artistic	Score	Rank
Mary Hanna	Sancette	Individual	67.964	43	Did not advance					
Kristy Oatley	Clive	Individual	68.222	42	Did not advance					
Lyndal Oatley	Sandro Boy	Individual	69.377	37	Did not advance					
Mary Hanna; Kristy Oatley; Lyndal Oatley	See above	Team	68.521	9	Did not advance		—N/a		68.521	9

=== Eventing ===
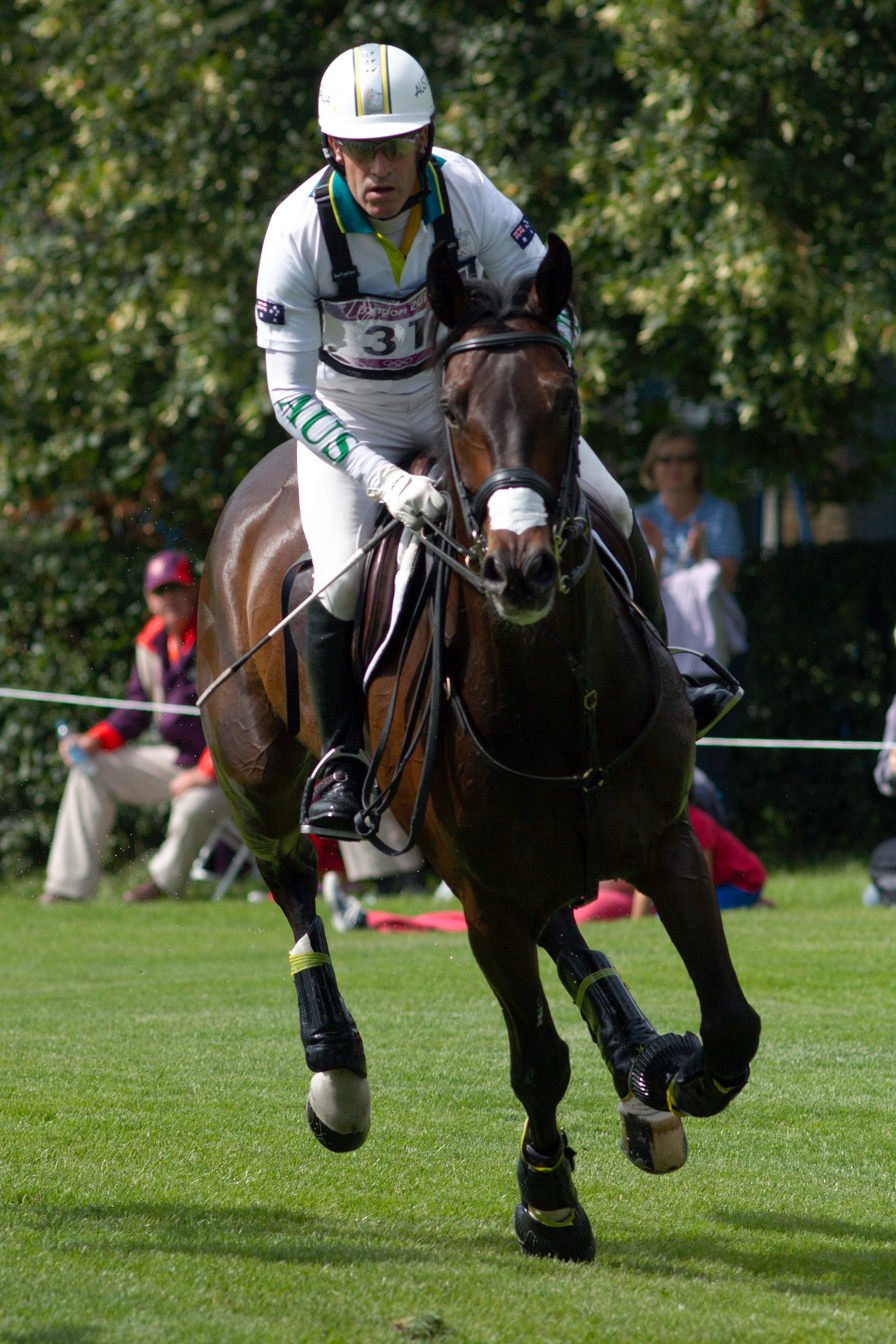
Andrew Hoy, in his seventh Olympic Games, and Rutherglen competing in the cross-country discipline of the eventing.

Athlete	Horse	Event	Dressage		Cross-country			Jumping						Total	
Athlete	Horse	Event	Dressage		Cross-country			Qualifier			Final			Total	
Athlete	Horse	Event	Penalties	Rank	Penalties	Total	Rank	Penalties	Total	Rank	Penalties	Total	Rank	Penalties	Rank
Chris Burton	HP Leilani	Individual	46.10	24	0.00	46.10	1	4.00	50.10	17 Q	12.0	62.10	22	62.10	16
Clayton Fredericks	Bendigo	Individual	40.40	10	Eliminated			Did not advance							
Lucinda Fredericks	Flying Finish	Individual	40.00	7	38.00	78.00	49	1.00	79.00	12	Did not advance			79.00	35
Sam Griffiths	Happy Times	Individual	45.40	23	Eliminated			Did not advance							
Andrew Hoy	Rutherglen	Individual	41.70	13	7.60	49.30	28	8.00	57.30	31 Q	0.00	57.30	1	57.30	13
Chris Burton; Clayton Fredericks; Lucinda Fredericks; Sam Griffiths; Andrew Hoy	See above	Team	122.10	2	51.30	173.40	9	13.0	186.40	7	—N/a			186.40	6

=== Show jumping ===
Athlete	Horse	Event	Qualification								Final					Total	
Athlete	Horse	Event	Round 1		Round 2			Round 3			Round A		Round B			Total	
Athlete	Horse	Event	Penalties	Rank	Penalties	Total	Rank	Penalties	Total	Rank	Penalties	Rank	Penalties	Total	Rank	Penalties	Rank
Julia Hargreaves	Vedor	Individual	0	=1 Q	8	8	31 Q	5	13	31 Q	17	35	Did not advance				
James Paterson-Robinson	Lanosso	Individual	4	=42 Q	4	8	31 Q	13	21	41	Did not advance						
Edwina Tops-Alexander	Itot du Chateau	Individual	0	=1 Q	0	0	=1Q	4	4	4 Q	4	11 Q	9	13	17	13	20
Matt Williams	Watch Me	Individual	42	72	Did not advance												
Julia Hargreaves; James Paterson-Robinson; Edwina Tops-Alexander; Matt Williams	See above	Team	—N/a								4	10	8	12	10	12	10

== Field hockey ==
Australia qualified a men's and a women's team. Each team had 16 athletes with two reserves.

=== Men's tournament ===
Roster

The following is the Australian roster in the men's field hockey tournament of the 2012 Summer Olympics.

Head Coach: Ric Charlesworth

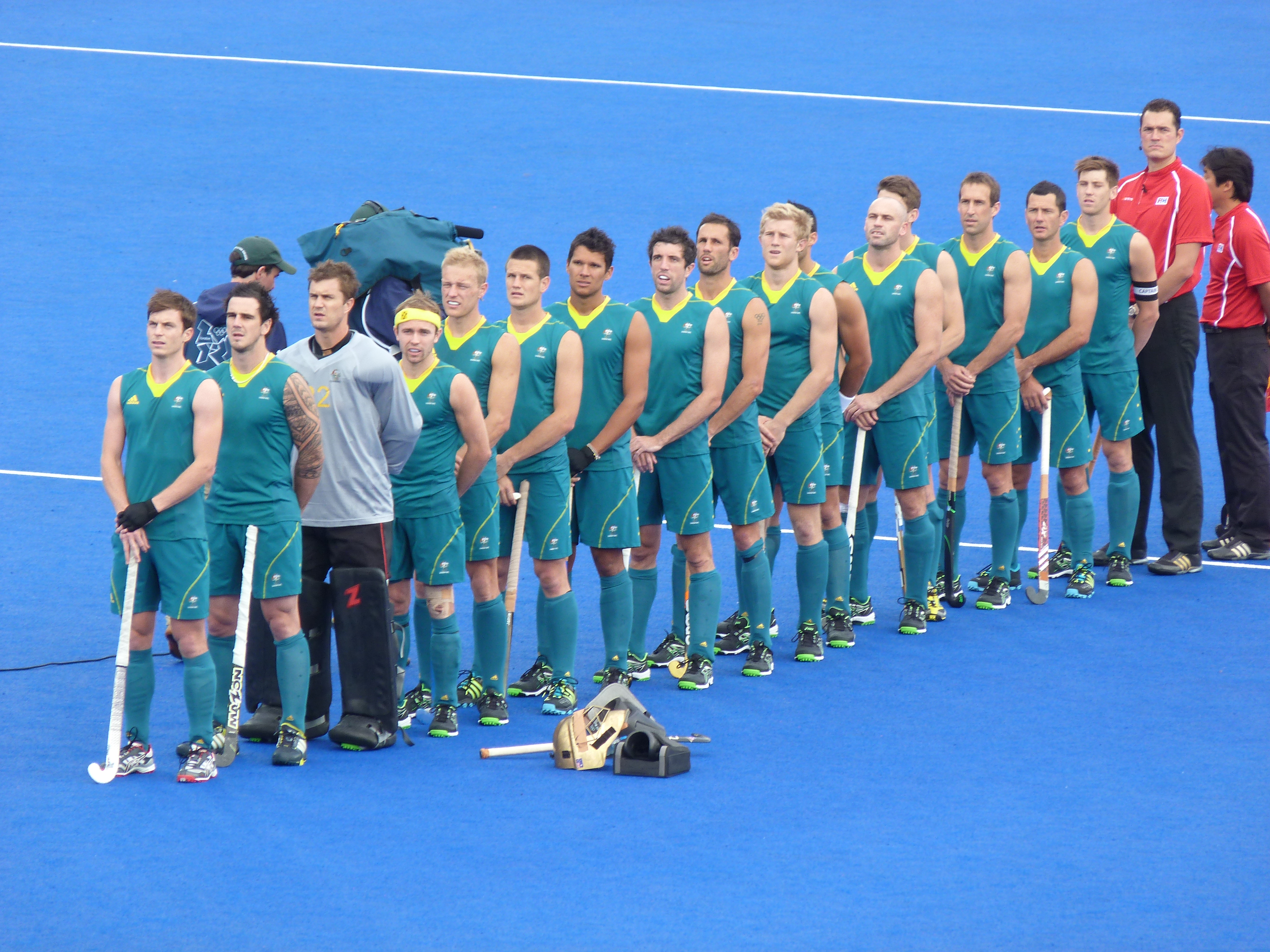
Australia national field hockey team before their game with Spain in the 2012 Olympics.

1. Jamie Dwyer (Vice-captain)
2. Liam de Young (Vice-captain)
3. Simon Orchard
4. Glenn Turner
5. Chris Ciriello
8. Matthew Butturini
9. Mark Knowles (C)
10. Russell Ford *
11. Eddie Ockenden
15. Joel Carroll
16. Matthew Gohdes
19. Tim Deavin
20. Matthew Swann
22. Nathan Burgers (GK)
27. Kieran Govers
31. Fergus Kavanagh

Reserves:

- Kiel Brown
- Andrew Charter (GK)

Group play

Australia was in Pool A of the men's tournament.

Pos	Team	Pld	W	D	L	GF	GA	GD	Pts	Qualification
1	Australia	5	3	2	0	23	5	+18	11	Semi-finals
2	Great Britain (H)	5	2	3	0	14	8	+6	9	Semi-finals
3	Spain	5	2	2	1	8	10	−2	8	Fifth place game
4	Pakistan	5	2	1	2	9	16	−7	7	Seventh place game
5	Argentina	5	1	1	3	10	14	−4	4	Ninth place game
6	South Africa	5	0	1	4	11	22	−11	1	Eleventh place game

Source: FIH
(H) Hosts

30 July 2012
10:45

Australia	6–0	South Africa
Dywer 16', 48', 58'; Butturini 33'; Ciriello 46'; Turner 62'	Report

Umpires:
Roel van Eert (NED)
Marcin Grochal (POL)

1 August 2012
08:30

Spain	0–5	Australia
	Report	Ford 9'; Butturini 14'; Orchard 29'; Turner 40'; Ockenden 69'

Umpires:
Kim Hong-lae (KOR)
Christian Blasch (GER)

3 August 2012
08:30

Australia	2–2	Argentina
Butturini 12'; Dwyer 35'	Report	M. Vila 37'; Peillat 68'

Umpires:
Raghu Prasad (IND)
John Wright (RSA)

5 August 2012
19:00

Great Britain	3–3	Australia
Clarke 47'; Middleton 53'; Tindall 66'	Report	Ford 7', 11'; Knowles 41'

Umpires:
Christian Blasch (GER)
John Wright (RSA)

7 August 2012
10:45

Australia	7–0	Pakistan
de Young 5'; Knowles 6'; Ciriello 29', 34'; Ford 42'; Dwyer 48'; Turner 70'	Report

Umpires:
Gary Simmonds (RSA)
Christian Blasch (GER)

Semi-final

9 August 2012
15:30

Australia	2–4	Germany
Govers 22'; Turner 42'	Report	Fürste 27'; Witthaus 54'; Weß 59'; Fuchs 63'

Umpires:
Gary Simmonds (RSA)
Hamish Jamson (GBR)

Bronze medal

11 August 2012
15:30

(bronze) Australia	3–1	Great Britain
Orchard 17'; Dwyer 48'; Govers 57'	Report	Lewers 29'

Umpires:
Christian Blach (GER)
Gary Simmonds (RSA)

=== Women's tournament ===
Roster

The following is the Australian roster in the women's field hockey tournament of the 2012 Summer Olympics.

Head Coach: Adam Commens

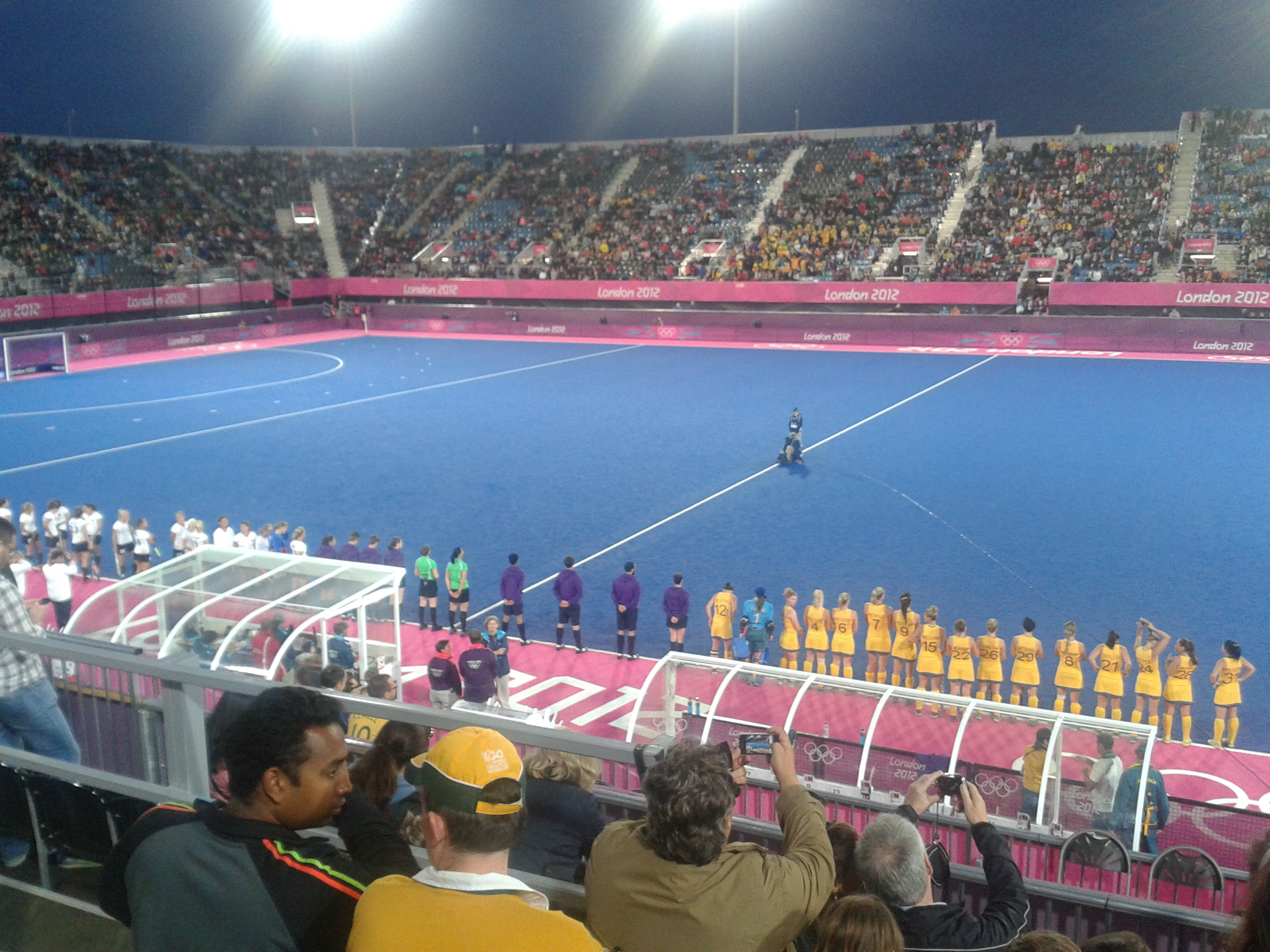
Australian team (in yellow) before the match versus Germany

1. Toni Cronk (GK)
2. Georgia Nanscawen
4. Casey Eastham
6. Megan Rivers
7. Jodie Schulz
8. Ashleigh Nelson
9. Anna Flanagan
12. Madonna Blyth (C)
15. Kobie McGurk
21. Jayde Taylor
22. Kate Jenner
24. Fiona Boyce
26. Emily Smith
28. Hope Munro
29. Teneal Attard
31. Jade Close

Reserves:

- Emily Hurtz
- Ashlee Wells (GK)

Group play

Australia was in Pool B of the women's competition.

Pos	Team	Pld	W	D	L	GF	GA	GD	Pts	Qualification
1	Argentina	5	3	1	1	12	4	+8	10	Semi-finals
2	New Zealand	5	3	1	1	9	5	+4	10	Semi-finals
3	Australia	5	3	1	1	5	2	+3	10	
4	Germany	5	2	1	2	6	7	−1	7	
5	South Africa	5	1	0	4	9	14	−5	3	
6	United States	5	1	0	4	4	13	−9	3	

Source: FIH
Rules for classification: 1) Points; 2) Matches won; 3) Goal difference; 4) Goals for; 5) Head-to-head result.

29 July 2012
08:30

New Zealand	1–0	Australia
Finlayson 3'	Report

Umpires:
Elena Eskina (RUS)
Carolina de la Fuente (ARG)

31 July 2012
21:15

Germany	1–3	Australia
Otte 9'	Report	Munro 20'; Flanagan 46'; Boyce 53'

Umpires:
Frances Block (GBR)
Michelle Joubert (RSA)

2 August 2012
10:45

Australia	1–0	United States
Flanagan 33'	Report

Umpires:
Stella Bartlema (NED)
Soledad Iparraguirre (ARG)

4 August 2012
08:30

Australia	1–0	South Africa
Close 8'	Report

Umpires:
Miao Lin (CHN)
Amy Hassick (USA)

6 August 2012
21:15

Argentina	0–0	Australia
	Report

Umpires:
Kang Hyun-young (KOR)
Michelle Joubert (RSA)

5th/6th place

10 August 2012
11:30

China	0–2	Australia
	Report	Schulz 41'; Close 60'

Umpires:
Frances Block (GBR)
Michelle Joubert (RSA)

== Gymnastics ==
=== Artistic ===
Australia qualified a women's team and an individual man.

Men

Athlete	Event	Qualification								Final							
Athlete	Event	Apparatus						Total	Rank	Apparatus						Total	Rank
Athlete	Event	F	PH	R	V	PB	HB	Total	Rank	F	PH	R	V	PB	HB	Total	Rank
Joshua Jefferis	All-around	13.800	13.433	14.533	15.500	14.566	13.766	85.598	27 Q	14.066	13.533	14.800	15.433	14.900	14.133	86.865	19

Women
Team

Athlete	Event	Qualification						Final					
Athlete	Event	Apparatus				Total	Rank	Apparatus				Total	Rank
Athlete	Event	F	V	UB	BB	Total	Rank	F	V	UB	BB	Total	Rank
Georgia Bonora	Team	—N/a	13.800	13.100	13.066	—N/a		Did not advance					
Ashleigh Brennan	Team	14.200	13.700	13.266	13.066	54.232	28 Q	Did not advance					
Emily Little	Team	12.666	14.766	13.433	13.633	54.498	24 Q	Did not advance					
Larrissa Miller	Team	13.466	—N/a	14.025	—N/a			Did not advance					
Lauren Mitchell	Team	14.833 Q	13.933	—N/a	14.300	—N/a		Did not advance					
Total	Team	42.999	42.099	40.724	40.999	166.721	10	Did not advance					

Individual finals

Athlete	Event	Apparatus				Total	Rank
Athlete	Event	F	V	UB	BB	Total	Rank
Ashleigh Brennan	All-around	13.233	13.533	14.400	14.166	55.332	20
Emily Little	All-around	14.866	13.933	13.666	13.300	55.765	15
Lauren Mitchell	Floor	14.833	—N/a			14.833	5

=== Rhythmic ===
Australia qualified one woman.

Athlete	Event	Qualification						Final					
Athlete	Event	Ball	Hoop	Clubs	Ribbon	Total	Rank	Ball	Hoop	Clubs	Ribbon	Total	Rank
Janine Murray	Individual	23.100	24.350	23.875	25.000	96.325	22	Did not advance					

=== Trampoline ===
Australia qualified one male athlete.

Athlete	Event	Qualification		Final	
Athlete	Event	Score	Rank	Score	Rank
Blake Gaudry	Men's	84.255	13	Did not advance	

== Judo ==
Australia qualified six judokas, five men and one woman.

Men

Athlete	Event	Round of 64	Round of 32	Round of 16	Quarterfinals	Semifinals	Repechage	Final / BM	
Athlete	Event	Opposition Result	Opposition Result	Opposition Result	Opposition Result	Opposition Result	Opposition Result	Opposition Result	Rank
Arnie Dickens	−60 kg	Shukvani (GEO); L 0000–0103	Did not advance						
Ivo Dos Santos	−66 kg	Bye	Oates (GBR); L 0002–0002 YUS	Did not advance					
Mark Anthony	−90 kg	—N/a	Bye	Liparteliani (GEO); W 0101–0020	González (CUB); L 0002–0010	Did not advance	Iliadis (GRE); L 0000–1000	Did not advance	7
Daniel Kelly	−100 kg	—N/a	Bloshenko (UKR); L 0003–0100	Did not advance					
Jake Andrewartha	+100 kg	—N/a	Sherrington (GBR); L 0000–0100	Did not advance					

Women

Athlete	Event	Round of 32	Round of 16	Quarterfinals	Semifinals	Repechage	Bronze Medal	Final
Athlete	Event	Opposition Result	Opposition Result	Opposition Result	Opposition Result	Opposition Result	Opposition Result	Rank
Carli Renzi	−57 kg	Bye	Pavia (FRA); L 0003–0151	Did not advance				

== Modern pentathlon ==
Based on their results at the 2011 Asian/Oceania Championships Edward Fernon and Chloe Esposito have qualified for modern pentathlon events in London.

Athlete	Event	Fencing (épée one touch)			Swimming (200 m freestyle)			Riding (show jumping)			Combined: shooting/running (10 m air pistol)/(3000 m)			Total points	Final rank
Athlete	Event	Results	Rank	MP points	Time	Rank	MP points	Penalties	Rank	MP points	Time	Rank	MP Points	Total points	Final rank
Edward Fernon	Men's	14–21	=29	736	2:13.10	33	1204	68	17	1132	10:48.19	14	2408	5480	27
Chloe Esposito	Women's	14–21	=28	736	2:12.28	5	1216	44	8	1156	11:55.40	5	2140	5248	7

== Rowing ==
Australia qualified 13 boats and 46 athletes.

Men

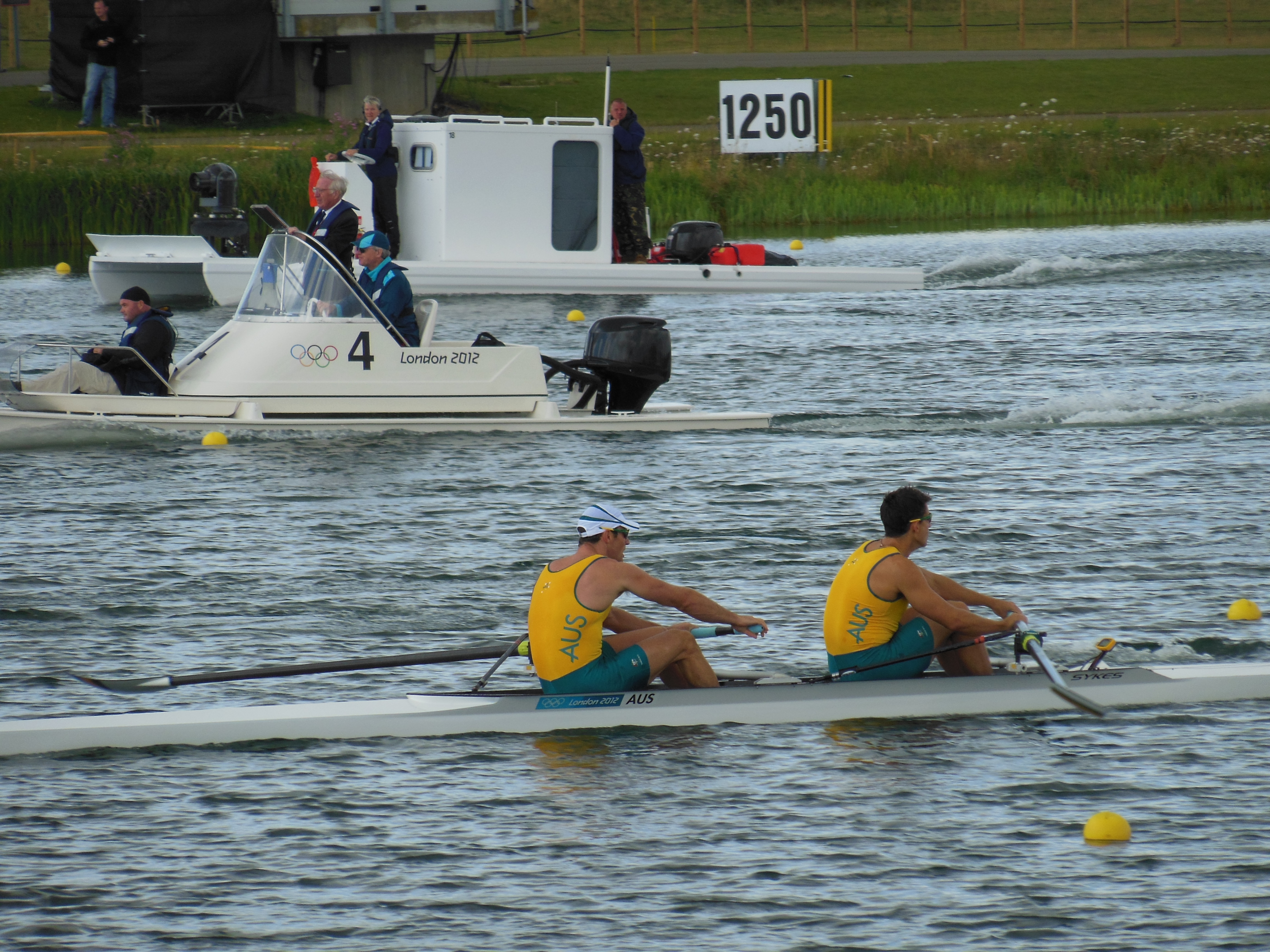
Australia during the final of the men's coxless pair.

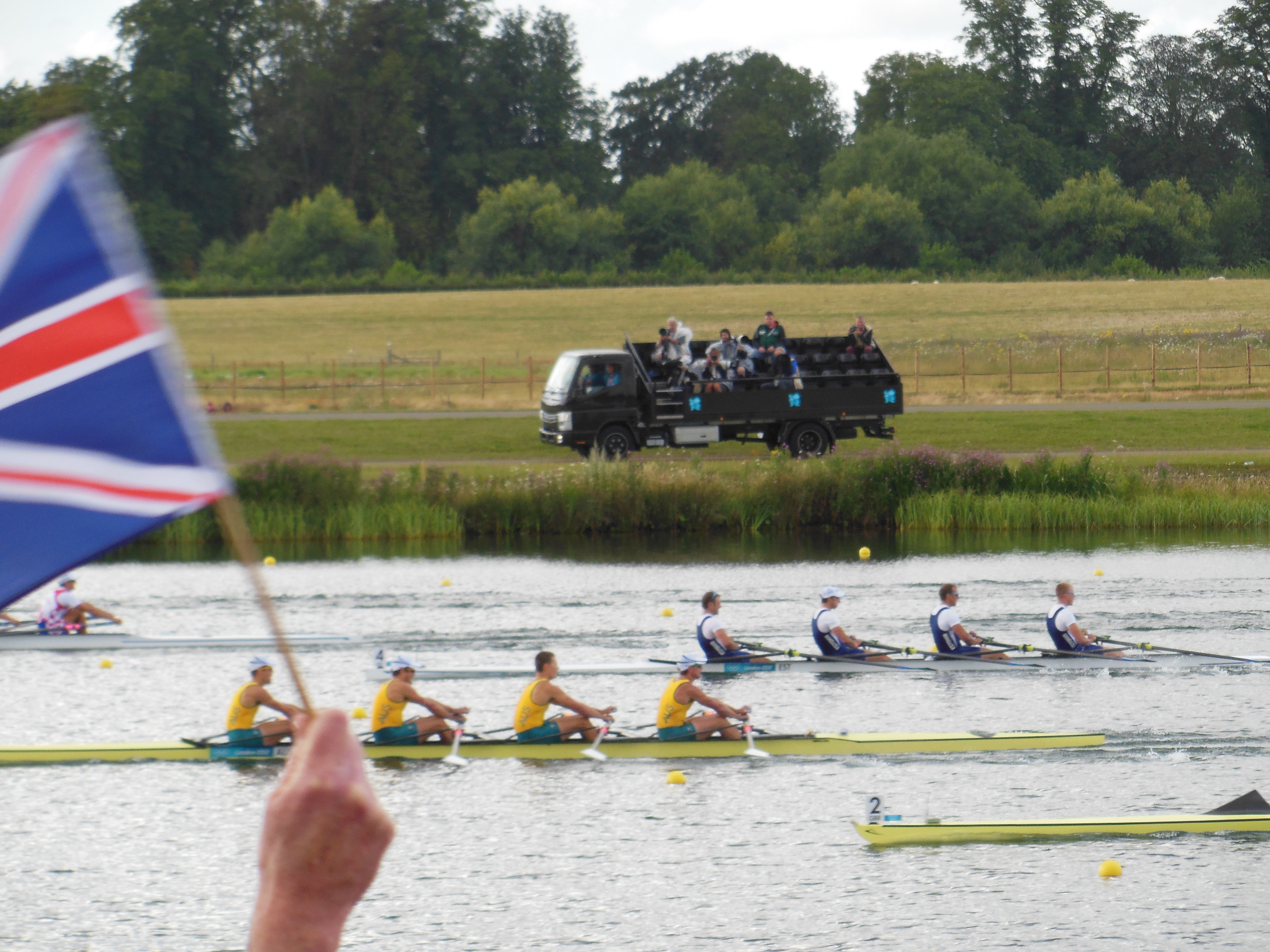
Australia (left boat) during the final of the men's quadruple sculls rowing to bronze.

Athlete	Event	Heats		Repechage		Semifinals		Final	
Athlete	Event	Time	Rank	Time	Rank	Time	Rank	Time	Rank
Brodie Buckland; James Marburg	Pair	6:24.83	2 SA/B	Bye		7.02.12	3 FA	7:02.12	5
Scott Brennan; David Crawshay	Double sculls	6:21.25	4 R	6:25.36	1 SA/B	6:23.47	5 FB	6:22.19	8
Rod Chisholm; Tom Gibson	Lightweight double sculls	6:47.33	3 R	6:34.29	3 SC/D	7:06.24	1 FC	6:44.40	13
James Chapman; Josh Dunkley-Smith; Drew Ginn; Will Lockwood	Four	5:47.06 OR	1 SA/B	Bye		5:59.23	2 FA	6:05.19	2nd place, silver medalist(s)
Karsten Forsterling; James McRae; Chris Morgan; Daniel Noonan	Quadruple sculls	5:41.56	3 SA/B	Bye		6:05.45	2 FA	5:45.22	3rd place, bronze medalist(s)
Samuel Beltz; Ben Cureton; Anthony Edwards; Todd Skipworth	Lightweight four	5:55.18	2 SA/B	Bye		6:05.31	3 FA	6:04.05	4
Josh Booth; Bryn Coudraye; Francis Hegerty; Tobias Lister; Samuel Loch; Cameron McKenzie-McHarg; Nick Purnell; Matt Ryan; Tom Swann	Eight	5:32.43	2 R	5:28.67	4 FA	—N/a		5:51.87	6

Women

Athlete	Event	Heats		Repechage		Quarterfinals		Semifinals		Final	
Athlete	Event	Time	Rank	Time	Rank	Time	Rank	Time	Rank	Time	Rank
Kim Crow	Single sculls	7:41.18	1 QF	Bye		7:34.29	1 SA/B	7:44.69	2 FA	7:58.04	3rd place, bronze medalist(s)
Kate Hornsey; Sarah Tait	Pair	7:01.60	1 FA	Bye		—N/a				7:29.86	2nd place, silver medalist(s)
Kim Crow; Brooke Pratley	Double sculls	6:48.80	1 FA	Bye		—N/a				6:58.55	2nd place, silver medalist(s)
Hannah Every-Hall; Bronwen Watson	Lightweight double sculls	7:05.30	2 SA/B	Bye		—N/a		7:12.35	3 FA	7:20.68	5
Amy Clay; Dana Faletic; Pauline Frasca; Kerry Hore	Quadruple sculls	6:17.52	2 R	6:18.80	1 FA	—N/a				6:41.67	4
Renee Chatterton; Sarah Cook; Tess Gerrand; Alexandra Hagan; Sally Kehoe; Elizabeth Patrick; Robyn Selby Smith; Phoebe Stanley; Hannah Vermeersch	Eight	6:20.89	2 R	6:18.63	3 FA	—N/a				6:18.86	6

Qualification Legend: FA=Final A (medal); FB=Final B (non-medal); FC=Final C (non-medal); FD=Final D (non-medal); FE=Final E (non-medal); FF=Final F (non-medal); SA/B=Semifinals A/B; SC/D=Semifinals C/D; SE/F=Semifinals E/F; QF=Quarterfinals; R=Repechage

== Sailing ==
Australia qualified 1 boat for each of the following events

Men

Athlete	Event	Race																Net points	Final rank
Athlete	Event	1	2	3	4	5	6	7	8	9	10	11	12	13	14	15	M*	Net points	Final rank
Tom Slingsby	Laser	2	1	2	6	9	2	~~15~~	1	1	1	—N/a					9	43	1st place, gold medalist(s)
Brendan Casey	Finn	~~25~~	7	9	16	10	17	19	9	9	5	—N/a					EL	106	13
Mathew Belcher; Malcolm Page	470	3	~~9~~	2	1	1	1	3	5	1	1	—N/a					4	22	1st place, gold medalist(s)
Nathan Outteridge; Iain Jensen	49er	8	1	2	4	2	1	~~10~~	6	9	5	4	1	1	1	3	4	56	1st place, gold medalist(s)

Women
Fleet racing

Athlete	Event	Race											Net points	Final rank
Athlete	Event	1	2	3	4	5	6	7	8	9	10	M*	Net points	Final rank
Jessica Crisp	RS:X	11	10	~~17~~	17	7	12	5	8	13	13	EL	96	11
Krystal Weir	Laser Radial	18	18	10	23	7	~~35~~	7	12	4	22	EL	121	12
Elise Rechichi; Belinda Stowell	470	14	7	3	~~21~~; ~~BFD~~	9	7	9	13	4	1	16	83	7

Match racing

Athlete	Event	Round Robin											Rank	Knockouts			Rank
Athlete	Event	FIN	FRA	USA	GBR	NZL	RUS	SWE	NED	ESP	DEN	POR	Rank	Q-final	S-final	Final	Rank
Nina Curtis; Olivia Price; Lucinda Whitty	Elliott 6m	W	W	W	W	W	W	W	W	W	W	W	1 Q	NED; W (3–1)	FIN; W (2–1)	ESP; L (2–3)	2nd place, silver medalist(s)

M = Medal race; EL = Eliminated – did not advance into the medal race

== Shooting ==
Australia qualified the following shooters.

Men

Athlete	Event	Qualification		Final	
Athlete	Event	Points	Rank	Points	Rank
Clive Barton	Skeet	109	33	Did not advance	
David Chapman	25 m rapid fire pistol	559	18	Did not advance	
Michael Diamond	Trap	125 OR	1 Q	145	4
Keith Ferguson	Skeet	116	20	Did not advance	
Will Godward	10 m air rifle	588	40	Did not advance	
Russell Mark	Double trap	128	20	Did not advance	
Warren Potent	50 m rifle prone	591	32	Did not advance	
Daniel Repacholi	10 m air pistol	575	28	Did not advance	
Daniel Repacholi	50 m pistol	557	19	Did not advance	
Dane Sampson	10 m air rifle	587	42	Did not advance	
Dane Sampson	50 m rifle 3 positions	1151	37	Did not advance	
Dane Sampson	50 m rifle prone	583	48	Did not advance	
Adam Vella	Trap	119	15	Did not advance	

Women

Athlete	Event	Qualification		Final	
Athlete	Event	Points	Rank	Points	Rank
Dina Aspandiyarova	10 m air pistol	382	14	Did not advance	
Suzanne Balogh	Trap	72	3 Q	87	6
Hayley Chapman	25 m pistol	278	39	Did not advance	
Lauryn Mark	Skeet	59	15	Did not advance	
Alethea Sedgman	10 m air rifle	387	52	Did not advance	
Alethea Sedgman	50 m rifle 3 positions	DNS		Did not advance	
Robyn van Nus	10 m air rifle	391	45	Did not advance	
Robyn van Nus	50 m rifle 3 positions	570	41	Did not advance	
Lalita Yauhleuskaya	10 m air pistol	371	40	Did not advance	
Lalita Yauhleuskaya	25 m pistol	288	23	Did not advance	

== Swimming ==
Australia entered swimmers in most events, after having achieved the qualifying standards (up to a maximum of two swimmers in each event at the Olympic Qualifying Time (OQT), and one at the Olympic Selection Time (OST)). 47 swimmers were selected to the team after the 2012 Australian Swimming Championships, held in Adelaide from 15 to 22 March 2012.

The Australian swimmers included the pre-Olympic favorite James Magnussen, competing in four of his individual and relay events, defending champion Stephanie Rice in the individual medley events, and breaststroker and former world-record holder Leisel Jones, who was at her fourth Olympics.

Australia left London with 10 swimming medals, one gold, six silver, and three bronze. The only gold medal was awarded to the women's 4 × 100 metres freestyle relay team. Swimmer Alicia Coutts became the nation's only female athlete to win five Olympic medals, including two from her individual events. Backstroker Emily Seebohm, on the other hand, broke a new Olympic record during the heats in the women's 100 m backstroke event, but managed to settle for silver in the finals. Jones and Rice qualified successfully for the final rounds of their respective individual events, but missed out of the medal standings. Magnussen, however, made a disappointing finish in all of his events, after winning only the silver medal in men's 100 m freestyle, behind U.S. swimmer Nathan Adrian, and the bronze in the men's 4 × 100 metres medley relay event.

Men

Athlete	Event	Heat		Semifinal		Final	
Athlete	Event	Time	Rank	Time	Rank	Time	Rank
Daniel Arnamnart	100 m backstroke	54.28	15 Q	54.48	16	Did not advance	
Nick D'Arcy	200 m butterfly	1:56.25	12 Q	1:56.07	13	Did not advance	
Thomas Fraser-Holmes	200 m freestyle	1:47.50	13 Q	1:46.80	8 Q	1:46.93	7
Thomas Fraser-Holmes	400 m individual medley	4:12.66	5 Q	—N/a		4:13.49	7
Jayden Hadler	100 m butterfly	52.52	22	Did not advance			
Jayden Hadler	200 m individual medley	2:01.54	31	Did not advance			
Ky Hurst	10 km open water	—N/a				1:51:41.3	20
Mitch Larkin	200 m backstroke	1:57.53	10 Q	1:56.82	7 Q	1:58.02	8
Matson Lawson	200 m backstroke	1:58.92	21	Did not advance			
James Magnussen	50 m freestyle	22.11	10 Q	22.00	11	Did not advance	
James Magnussen	100 m freestyle	48.38	4 Q	47.63	1 Q	47.53	2nd place, silver medalist(s)
David McKeon	400 m freestyle	3:48.57	13	—N/a		Did not advance	
Kenrick Monk	200 m freestyle	1:46.94	7 Q	1:47.38	13	Did not advance	
Ryan Napoleon	400 m freestyle	3:47.01	6 Q	—N/a		3:49.25	8
Jarrod Poort	1500 m freestyle	15:20.82	18	—N/a		Did not advance	
Brenton Rickard	100 m breaststroke	1:00.07	14 Q	59.50	3 Q	59.87	6
Brenton Rickard	200 m breaststroke	2:11.41	15 Q	2:09.31	5 Q	2:09.28	7
James Roberts	100 m freestyle	48.93	13 Q	48.57	=12	Did not advance	
Christian Sprenger	100 m breaststroke	59.62	1 Q	59.61	4 Q	58.93	2nd place, silver medalist(s)
Hayden Stoeckel	100 m backstroke	53.88	9 Q	53.72	8 Q	53.55	7
Eamon Sullivan	50 m freestyle	22.27	16 Q	21.88	=7 Q	21.98	8
Daniel Tranter	200 m individual medley	1:59.70	13 Q	2:00.46	13	Did not advance	
Daniel Tranter	400 m individual medley	4:25.76	32	—N/a		Did not advance	
Chris Wright	100 m butterfly	52.11	10 Q	52.11	11	Did not advance	
Chris Wright	200 m butterfly	1:56.69	14 Q	1:58.56	16	Did not advance	
Tommaso D'Orsogna*; James Magnussen; Cameron McEvoy*; James Roberts; Eamon Sullivan; Matt Targett	4 × 100 m freestyle relay	3:12.29	1 Q	—N/a		3:11.63	4
Thomas Fraser-Holmes; Cameron McEvoy*; Ned McKendry; David McKeon*; Kenrick Monk; Ryan Napoleon	4 × 200 m freestyle relay	7:10.50	4 Q	—N/a		7.07.00	5
Tommaso D'Orsogna*; James Magnussen; Brenton Rickard*; Christian Sprenger; Hayden Stoeckel; Matt Targett	4 × 100 m medley relay	3:33.73	4 Q	—N/a		3:31.58	3rd place, bronze medalist(s)

Women

Athlete	Event	Heat		Semifinal		Final	
Athlete	Event	Time	Rank	Time	Rank	Time	Rank
Jessica Ashwood	800 m freestyle	8:37.21	20	—N/a		Did not advance	
Bronte Barratt	200 m freestyle	1:58.12	10 Q	1:56.08	1 Q	1:55.81	3rd place, bronze medalist(s)
Bronte Barratt	400 m freestyle	4:07.99	12	—N/a		Did not advance	
Bronte Campbell	50 m freestyle	24.87	9 Q	24.94	=10	Did not advance	
Cate Campbell	50 m freestyle	24.94	=10 Q	25.01	13	Did not advance	
Cate Campbell	100 m freestyle	DNS		Did not advance			
Alicia Coutts	100 m butterfly	57.36	3 Q	56.85	2 Q	56.94	3rd place, bronze medalist(s)
Alicia Coutts	200 m individual medley	2:10.74	5 Q	2:09.83	2 Q	2:08.15	2nd place, silver medalist(s)
Blair Evans	400 m individual medley	4:40.32	14	—N/a		Did not advance	
Sally Foster	200 m breaststroke	2:26.04	10 Q	2:24.48	8 Q	2:26.00	8
Melissa Gorman	10 km open water	—N/a				1:58:53.1	11
Samantha Hamill	200 m butterfly	2:11.07	20	Did not advance			
Belinda Hocking	100 m backstroke	59.61	3 Q	59.79	4 Q	59.29	7
Belinda Hocking	200 m backstroke	2:08.75	5 Q	2:09.35	10	Did not advance	
Leisel Jones	100 m breaststroke	1:06.98	5 Q	1:06.81	5 Q	1:06.95	5
Meagen Nay	200 m backstroke	2:08.40	4 Q	2:07.42	3 Q	2:07.43	5
Kylie Palmer	200 m freestyle	1:58.16	11 Q	1:57.44	7 Q	1:57.68	8
Kylie Palmer	400 m freestyle	4:07.27	11	—N/a		Did not advance	
Kylie Palmer	800 m freestyle	8:35.75	18	—N/a		Did not advance	
Leiston Pickett	100 m breaststroke	1:07.41	11 Q	1:07.74	13	Did not advance	
Stephanie Rice	200 m individual medley	2:12.23	3 Q	2:10.80	5 Q	2:09.15	4
Stephanie Rice	400 m individual medley	4:35.76	7 Q	—N/a		4:35.49	6
Jessicah Schipper	100 m butterfly	59.17	24	Did not advance			
Jessicah Schipper	200 m butterfly	2:08.74	12 Q	2:08.21	13	Did not advance	
Melanie Schlanger	100 m freestyle	53.50	2 Q	53.38	2 Q	53.47	4
Emily Seebohm	100 m backstroke	58.23 OR	1 Q	58.39	1 Q	58.68	2nd place, silver medalist(s)
Tessa Wallace	200 m breaststroke	2:26.94	16 Q	2:27.38	15	Did not advance	
Cate Campbell; Alicia Coutts; Brittany Elmslie; Yolane Kukla*; Melanie Schlanger; Emily Seebohm*; Lisbeth Trickett*	4 × 100 m freestyle relay	3:36.34	1 Q	—N/a		3:33.15 OR	1st place, gold medalist(s)
Angie Bainbridge*; Bronte Barratt; Alicia Coutts; Brittany Elmslie*; Blair Evans*; Jade Neilsen*; Kylie Palmer; Melanie Schlanger	4 × 200 m freestyle relay	7:49.44	1 Q	—N/a		7:44.41	2nd place, silver medalist(s)
Alicia Coutts; Brittany Elmslie*; Leisel Jones; Melanie Schlanger; Emily Seebohm	4 × 100 m medley relay	3:55.42	1 Q	—N/a		3:54.02	2nd place, silver medalist(s)

== Synchronised swimming ==
Australia qualified a duet and a team, for a total of nine athletes.

Athlete	Event	Technical routine		Free routine (preliminary)			Free routine (final)		
Athlete	Event	Points	Rank	Points	Total (technical + free)	Rank	Points	Total (technical + free)	Rank
Eloise Amberger; Sarah Bombell	Duet	77.400	23	77.480	154.880	23	Did not advance		
Eloise Amberger; Jenny-Lyn Anderson; Sarah Bombell; Olga Burtaev; Tamika Domrow; Bianca Hammett; Tarren Otte; Frankie Owen; Samantha Reid	Team	77.500	8	—N/a			77.430	154.930	8

== Table tennis ==
Australia qualified four athletes for the singles competitions, and one team of three in both team competitions.

Men

Athlete	Event	Preliminary round	Round 1	Round 2	Round 3	Round of 16	Quarterfinals	Semifinals	Final / BM	
Athlete	Event	Opposition Result	Opposition Result	Opposition Result	Opposition Result	Opposition Result	Opposition Result	Opposition Result	Opposition Result	Rank
Justin Han	Singles	Agbetoglo (TOG); W 4–2	Alamian (IRI); L 0–4	Did not advance						
William Henzell	Singles	Bye	Pattantyús (HUN); W 4–1	Monteiro (POR); W 4–2	Samsonov (BLR); L 3–4	Did not advance				
Robert Frank; Justin Han; William Henzell	Team	—N/a				Singapore; L 0–3	Did not advance			

Women

Athlete	Event	Preliminary round	Round 1	Round 2	Round 3	Round of 16	Quarterfinals	Semifinals	Final / BM	
Athlete	Event	Opposition Result	Opposition Result	Opposition Result	Opposition Result	Opposition Result	Opposition Result	Opposition Result	Opposition Result	Rank
Jian Fang Lay	Singles	Bye	Silva (BRA); W 4–1	Li X (FRA); L 3–4	Did not advance					
Miao Miao	Singles	Bye	Hadačová (CZE); W 4–2	Huang Y-h (TPE); L 0–4	Did not advance					
Jian Fang Lay; Miao Miao; Vivian Tan	Team	—N/a				Germany; L 0–3	Did not advance			

== Taekwondo ==
Australia qualified two athletes.

Athlete	Event	Round of 16	Quarterfinals	Semifinals	Repechage	Bronze Medal	Final	
Athlete	Event	Opposition Result	Opposition Result	Opposition Result	Opposition Result	Opposition Result	Opposition Result	Rank
Safwan Khalil	Men's −58 kg	García (MEX); W 9–4	González (ESP); L 3–5	Did not advance	Sanli (SWE); W 4–1	Denisenko (RUS); L 1–3	Did not advance	5
Carmen Marton	Women's −67 kg	Hajipourgoli (IRI); W 5–4 SDP	Johansson (SWE); W 6–3	Tatar (TUR); L 0–6	Bye	Fromm (GER); L 2–8	Did not advance	5

== Tennis ==
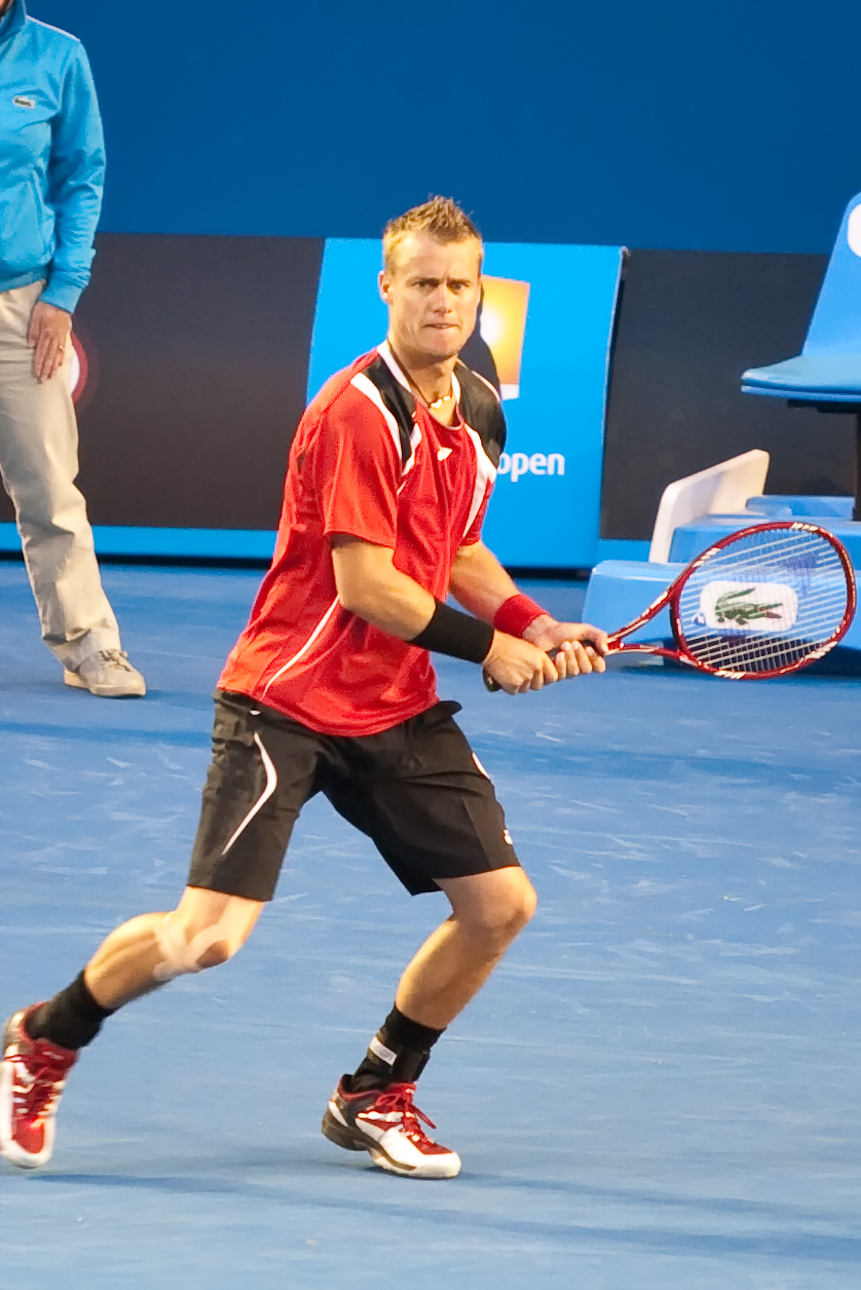
Lleyton Hewitt competed in both the Men's singles and the Mixed doubles competitions, partnering Samantha Stosur in the latter.

Men

Athlete	Event	Round of 64	Round of 32	Round of 16	Quarterfinals	Semifinals	Final / BM	
Athlete	Event	Opposition Score	Opposition Score	Opposition Score	Opposition Score	Opposition Score	Opposition Score	Rank
Bernard Tomic	Singles	Nishikori (JPN); L 6–7^{(4–7)}, 6–7^{(4–7)}	Did not advance					
Lleyton Hewitt	Singles	Stakhovsky (UKR); W 6–3, 4–6, 6–3	Čilić (CRO); W 6–4, 7–5	Djokovic (SRB); L 6–4, 5–7, 1–6	Did not advance			

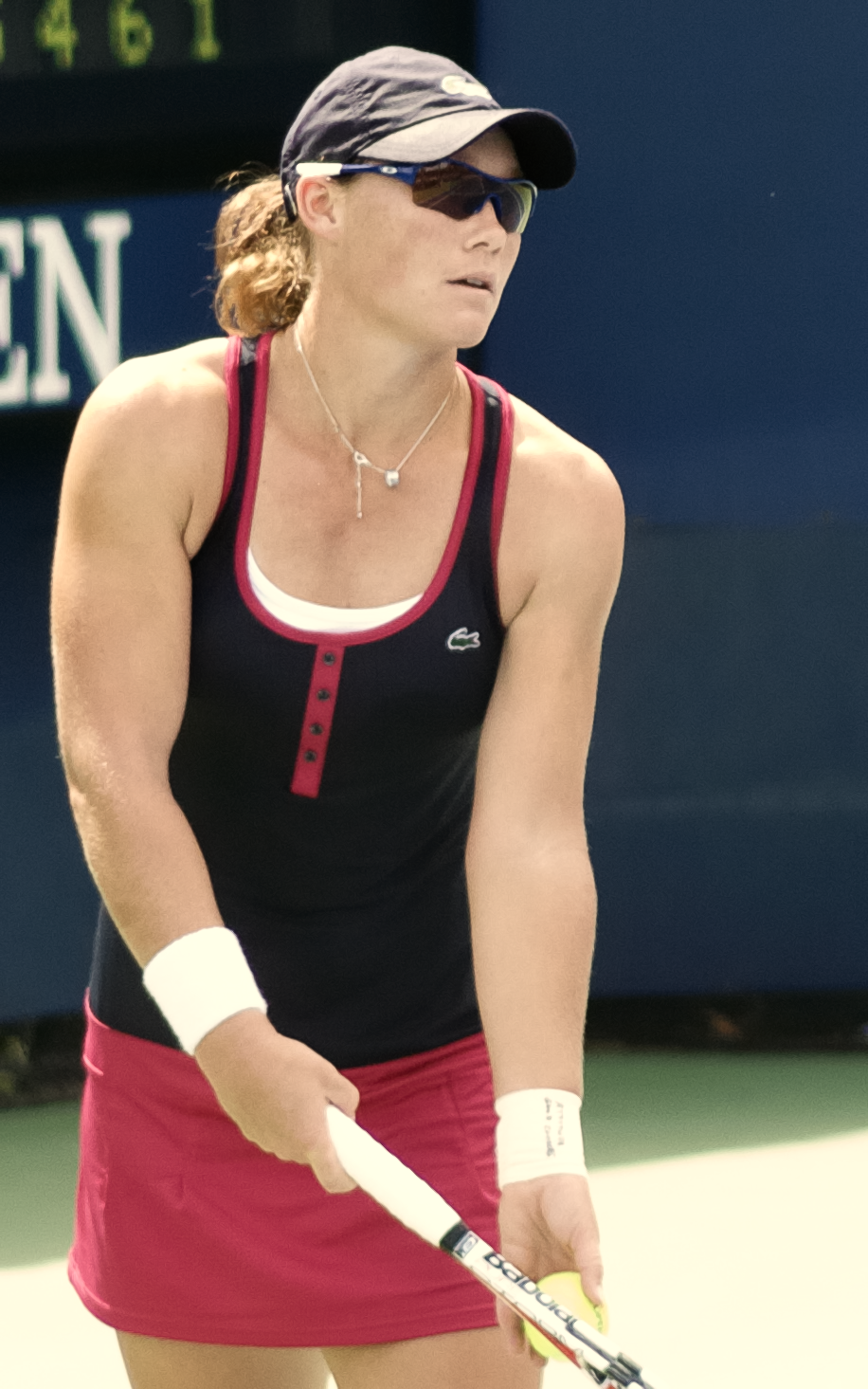
Samantha Stosur competed in both the Women's singles and the Mixed doubles competitions, partnering Lleyton Hewitt in the latter.

Women

Athlete	Event	Round of 64	Round of 32	Round of 16	Quarterfinals	Semifinals	Final / BM	
Athlete	Event	Opposition Score	Opposition Score	Opposition Score	Opposition Score	Opposition Score	Opposition Score	Rank
Samantha Stosur	Singles	Suárez Navarro (ESP); L 6–3, 5–7, 8–10	Did not advance					
Jarmila Gajdošová; Anastasia Rodionova	Doubles	—N/a	Makarova / Vesnina (RUS); L 1–6, 4–6	Did not advance				
Casey Dellacqua; Samantha Stosur	Doubles	—N/a	Llagostera Vives / Martínez Sánchez (ESP); L 1–6, 1–6	Did not advance				

Mixed

Athlete	Event	Round of 16	Quarterfinals	Semifinals	Final / BM	
Athlete	Event	Opposition Score	Opposition Score	Opposition Score	Opposition Score	Rank
Samantha Stosur; Lleyton Hewitt	Doubles	Radwańska / Matkowski (POL); W 6–3, 6–3	Robson / Murray (GBR); L 3–6, 6–3, [8–10]	Did not advance		

== Triathlon ==
Australia qualified six athletes.

Athlete	Event	Swim (1.5 km)	Trans 1	Bike (40 km)	Trans 2	Run (10 km)	Total Time	Rank
Courtney Atkinson	Men's	17:26	0:39	1:16:53	0:28	31:58	1:49:19	18
Brad Kahlefeldt	Men's	18:06	0:39	1:18:25	0:29	31:29	1:50:23	32
Brendan Sexton	Men's	18:53	0:42	1:18:26	0:29	31:41	1:50:36	35
Erin Densham	Women's	19:25	0:40	1:05:33	0:30	33.42	1:59.50	3rd place, bronze medalist(s)
Emma Jackson	Women's	19:25	0:42	1:05:32	0:30	35:07	2:01:16	8
Emma Moffatt	Women's	19:23	0:43	did not finish				

== Volleyball ==
=== Beach ===
Australia qualified two women teams, one via the Olympic ranking and other after winning the AVC Continental Beach Volleyball Cup.

Athlete	Event	Preliminary round	Standing	Round of 16	Quarterfinals	Semifinals	Final / BM	
Athlete	Event	Opposition Score	Standing	Opposition Score	Opposition Score	Opposition Score	Opposition Score	Rank
Louise Bawden; Becchara Palmer	Women's	Pool E Goller – Ludwig (GER); L 1 – 2 (18–21, 21–19, 8–15); Meppelink – van Gestel (NED); L 0 – 2 (19–21, 15–21); Antonelli – Antunes (BRA); L 1 – 2 (21–18, 16–21, 9–15)	4	Did not advance				19
Natalie Cook; Tamsin Hinchley	Women's	Pool C May-Treanor – Walsh Jennings (USA); L 0 – 2 (18–21, 19–21); D Schwaiger – S Schwaiger (AUT); L 1 – 2 (21–18, 20–22, 10–15); Kolocová – Sluková (CZE); L 1 – 2 (16–21, 21–18, 11–15)	4	Did not advance				19

=== Indoor ===
==== Men's tournament ====
Australian men's team qualified after finishing 2nd FIVB in the men's Olympic Qualification Tournament in Tokyo.

Roster

The following is the Australian roster in the men's volleyball tournament of the 2012 Summer Olympics.

Head coach: (Argentina) Jon Uriarte

№	Name	Date of birth	Height	Weight	Spike	Block	2012 club
1	Aidan Zingel	19 November 1990	2.07 m (6 ft 9 in)	100 kg (220 lb)	361 cm (142 in)	346 cm (136 in)	(Italy) Blu Volley Verona
3	Nathan Roberts	17 February 1986	1.99 m (6 ft 6 in)	90 kg (200 lb)	342 cm (135 in)	328 cm (129 in)	(Italy) CMC Ravenna
5	Travis Passier	26 April 1989	2.05 m (6 ft 9 in)	99 kg (218 lb)	351 cm (138 in)	340 cm (130 in)	(Italy) M. Roma Volley
6	Igor Yudin (c)	17 June 1987	2.00 m (6 ft 7 in)	85 kg (187 lb)	362 cm (143 in)	352 cm (139 in)	(Russia) Yaroslavich Yaroslavl
7	Harrison Peacock	31 January 1991	1.92 m (6 ft 4 in)	87 kg (192 lb)	337 cm (133 in)	353 cm (139 in)	(Sweden) Linköpings VC
8	Andrew Grant	22 April 1985	2.06 m (6 ft 9 in)	93 kg (205 lb)	345 cm (136 in)	328 cm (129 in)	(Australia) Australian Institute of Sport
9	Adam White	8 November 1989	2.03 m (6 ft 8 in)	89 kg (196 lb)	351 cm (138 in)	336 cm (132 in)	(Netherlands) Langhenkel Volley
12	Aden Tutton (L)	6 February 1984	1.82 m (6 ft 0 in)	81 kg (179 lb)	333 cm (131 in)	315 cm (124 in)	(Netherlands) Langhenkel Volley
14	Greg Sukochev	18 February 1988	1.96 m (6 ft 5 in)	86 kg (190 lb)	337 cm (133 in)	324 cm (128 in)	(Slovakia) VK Chemes Humenné
16	Luke Smith	30 August 1990	2.04 m (6 ft 8 in)	95 kg (209 lb)	360 cm (140 in)	342 cm (135 in)	(Sweden) Linköpings VC
18	Lincoln Williams	6 October 1993	2.00 m (6 ft 7 in)	104 kg (229 lb)	353 cm (139 in)	330 cm (130 in)	(Australia) Australian Institute of Sport
19	Thomas Edgar	21 June 1989	2.12 m (6 ft 11 in)	106 kg (234 lb)	357 cm (141 in)	341 cm (134 in)	(Italy) Caffe Aiello Corigliano

Group play

Pos	Team	Pld	W	L	Pts	SW	SL	SR	SPW	SPL	SPR
1	Bulgaria	5	4	1	12	13	4	3.250	407	390	1.044
2	Poland	5	3	2	9	11	7	1.571	433	374	1.158
3	Argentina	5	3	2	9	10	7	1.429	382	367	1.041
4	Italy	5	3	2	8	10	9	1.111	426	413	1.031
5	Australia	5	2	3	7	8	10	0.800	395	397	0.995
6	Great Britain	5	0	5	0	0	15	0.000	274	376	0.729

29 July 2012; 14:45	Australia	0–3	Argentina	Earls Court Exhibition Centre, London; Attendance: 11,500; Referees: Nasr Shaaban (EGY), Susana Rodriguez (ESP)
29 July 2012; 14:45	(21–25, 22–25, 20–25); Results Statistics			Earls Court Exhibition Centre, London; Attendance: 11,500; Referees: Nasr Shaaban (EGY), Susana Rodriguez (ESP)

31 July 2012; 20:00	Great Britain	0–3	Australia	Earls Court Exhibition Centre, London; Attendance: 14,000; Referees: Georgios Karampetsos (GRE), Rogerio Espicalsky (BRA)
31 July 2012; 20:00	(15–25, 18–25, 20–25); Results Statistics			Earls Court Exhibition Centre, London; Attendance: 14,000; Referees: Georgios Karampetsos (GRE), Rogerio Espicalsky (BRA)

2 August 2012; 12:20	Australia	0–3	Bulgaria	Earls Court Exhibition Centre, London; Attendance: 12,000; Referees: Wang Ning (CHN), Andrey Zenovich (RUS)
2 August 2012; 12:20	(23–25, 21–25, 22–25); Results Statistics			Earls Court Exhibition Centre, London; Attendance: 12,000; Referees: Wang Ning (CHN), Andrey Zenovich (RUS)

4 August 2012; 14:45	Australia	2–3	Italy	Earls Court Exhibition Centre, London; Attendance: 11,500; Referees: Andrey Zenovich (RUS), Rogerio Espicalsky (BRA)
4 August 2012; 14:45	(25–21, 25–18, 21–25, 14–25, 13–15); Results Statistics			Earls Court Exhibition Centre, London; Attendance: 11,500; Referees: Andrey Zenovich (RUS), Rogerio Espicalsky (BRA)

6 August 2012; 09:30	Australia	3–1	Poland	Earls Court Exhibition Centre, London; Attendance: 12,000; Referees: Rogerio Espicalsky (BRA), Andrey Zenovich (RUS)
6 August 2012; 09:30	(25–21, 25–22, 18–25, 25–22); Results Statistics			Earls Court Exhibition Centre, London; Attendance: 12,000; Referees: Rogerio Espicalsky (BRA), Andrey Zenovich (RUS)

== Water polo ==
Australia qualified a men's and a women's team. Each team was made up of 13 athletes.

=== Men's tournament ===
Roster

The following is the Australian roster in the men's water polo tournament of the 2012 Summer Olympics.

№	Name	Pos.	Height	Weight	Date of birth	2012 club
1	Joel Dennerley	GK	194 cm (6 ft 4 in)	94 kg (207 lb)	25 June 1987	(Australia) UNSW Wests Magpies
2	Richie Campbell	CB	193 cm (6 ft 4 in)	99 kg (218 lb)	18 September 1987	(Australia) UNSW Wests Magpies
3	Tim Cleland	CB	195 cm (6 ft 5 in)	115 kg (254 lb)	15 December 1984	(Australia) Fremantle Mariners
4	Johnno Cotterill	D	193 cm (6 ft 4 in)	88 kg (194 lb)	27 October 1987	(Greece) Panionios Water Polo Club
5	Aaron Younger	D	193 cm (6 ft 4 in)	100 kg (220 lb)	25 September 1991	(Hungary) Szeged Beton
6	Jamie Beadsworth	CF	193 cm (6 ft 4 in)	114 kg (251 lb)	11 June 1985	(Australia) Fremantle Mariners
7	Aiden Roach	D	186 cm (6 ft 1 in)	88 kg (194 lb)	7 September 1990	(Australia) Drummoyne Devils
8	Sam McGregor	D	192 cm (6 ft 4 in)	95 kg (209 lb)	12 August 1984	(Australia) Victorian Tigers
9	Thomas Whalan	D	194 cm (6 ft 4 in)	90 kg (198 lb)	13 October 1980	(Australia) Sydney Uni Water Polo Club
10	Gavin Woods	CF	199 cm (6 ft 6 in)	95 kg (209 lb)	1 March 1978	(Australia) Balmain Tigers
11	Rhys Howden	D	188 cm (6 ft 2 in)	82 kg (181 lb)	2 April 1987	(Australia) Brisbane Barracudas
12	Billy Miller	D	188 cm (6 ft 2 in)	89 kg (196 lb)	21 February 1988	(Australia) Queensland Breakers
13	James Clark	GK	195 cm (6 ft 5 in)	95 kg (209 lb)	22 March 1991	(Australia) Balmain Water Polo Club

Head coach: John Fox

Group play

Team	Pld	W	D	L	GF	GA	GD	Pts	Qualification
Croatia	5	5	0	0	50	29	+21	10	Quarterfinals
Italy	5	3	1	1	40	36	+4	7	Quarterfinals
Spain	5	3	0	2	52	42	+10	6	Quarterfinals
Australia	5	2	0	3	40	44	−4	4	Quarterfinals
Greece	5	1	1	3	41	43	−2	3	
Kazakhstan	5	0	0	5	24	53	−29	0	

29 July 2012; 14:10	Report	Italy	8–5	Australia	Water Polo Arena, London; Referees: Boris Margeta (SLO), Radoslaw Koryzna (POL)
29 July 2012; 14:10	Report	Score by quarters: 3–0, 2–2, 0–1, 3–2			Water Polo Arena, London; Referees: Boris Margeta (SLO), Radoslaw Koryzna (POL)
29 July 2012; 14:10	Report	Felugo, Giorgetti 2	Goals	five players 1	Water Polo Arena, London; Referees: Boris Margeta (SLO), Radoslaw Koryzna (POL)

31 July 2012; 14:10	Report	Australia	7–4	Kazakhstan	Water Polo Arena, London; Referees: Adrian Alexandrescu (ROU), Ulrich Spiegel (GER)
31 July 2012; 14:10	Report	Score by quarters: 2–1, 2–0, 2–2, 1–1			Water Polo Arena, London; Referees: Adrian Alexandrescu (ROU), Ulrich Spiegel (GER)
31 July 2012; 14:10	Report	Howden 2	Goals	four players 1	Water Polo Arena, London; Referees: Adrian Alexandrescu (ROU), Ulrich Spiegel (GER)

2 August 2012; 10:00	Report	Spain	13–9	Australia	Water Polo Arena, London; Referees: Mihajlo Ćirić (SRB), Steven Rotsart (USA)
2 August 2012; 10:00	Report	Score by quarters: 2–1, 3–3, 4–1, 4–4			Water Polo Arena, London; Referees: Mihajlo Ćirić (SRB), Steven Rotsart (USA)
2 August 2012; 10:00	Report	three players 2	Goals	Miller 5	Water Polo Arena, London; Referees: Mihajlo Ćirić (SRB), Steven Rotsart (USA)

4 August 2012; 11:20	Report	Croatia	11–6	Australia	Water Polo Arena, London; Referees: Ulrich Spiegel (GER), Gyorgy Juhasz (HUN)
4 August 2012; 11:20	Report	Score by quarters: 2–1, 3–1, 3–2, 3–2			Water Polo Arena, London; Referees: Ulrich Spiegel (GER), Gyorgy Juhasz (HUN)
4 August 2012; 11:20	Report	Joković 3	Goals	Whalan 3	Water Polo Arena, London; Referees: Ulrich Spiegel (GER), Gyorgy Juhasz (HUN)

6 August 2012; 11:20	Report	Greece	8–13	Australia	Water Polo Arena, London; Referees: Mihajlo Ćirić (SRB), Sergi Sanchez (ESP)
6 August 2012; 11:20	Report	Score by quarters: 2–3, 3–5, 1–3, 2–2			Water Polo Arena, London; Referees: Mihajlo Ćirić (SRB), Sergi Sanchez (ESP)
6 August 2012; 11:20	Report	Chatzitheodorou 3	Goals	Howden 3	Water Polo Arena, London; Referees: Mihajlo Ćirić (SRB), Sergi Sanchez (ESP)

Quarter-final

8 August 2012; 15:50	Report	Australia	8–11	Serbia	Water Polo Arena, London; Referees: Sergi Sanchez (ESP), Steven Rotsart (USA)
8 August 2012; 15:50	Report	Score by quarters: 3–2, 4–2, 1–2, 0–5			Water Polo Arena, London; Referees: Sergi Sanchez (ESP), Steven Rotsart (USA)
8 August 2012; 15:50	Report	Campbell, Beadsworth 2	Goals	Filipović 3	Water Polo Arena, London; Referees: Sergi Sanchez (ESP), Steven Rotsart (USA)

Fifth-sixth place game

10 August 2012; 18:30	Report	Hungary	10–9	Australia	Water Polo Arena, London; Referees: Mihajlo Ćirić (SRB), German Moller (ARG)
10 August 2012; 18:30	Report	Score by quarters: 4–2, 2–4, 1–0, 3–3			Water Polo Arena, London; Referees: Mihajlo Ćirić (SRB), German Moller (ARG)
10 August 2012; 18:30	Report	Madaras, Biros 3	Goals	three players 2	Water Polo Arena, London; Referees: Mihajlo Ćirić (SRB), German Moller (ARG)

Seventh-eight place game

12 August 2012; 10:20	Report	United States	9–10	Australia	Water Polo Arena, London; Referees: Dragan Stampalija (CRO), Ulrich Spiegel (GER)
12 August 2012; 10:20	Report	Score by quarters: 1–3, 2–2, 1–3, 5–2			Water Polo Arena, London; Referees: Dragan Stampalija (CRO), Ulrich Spiegel (GER)
12 August 2012; 10:20	Report	four players 2	Goals	Miller, Campbell 3	Water Polo Arena, London; Referees: Dragan Stampalija (CRO), Ulrich Spiegel (GER)

=== Women's tournament ===
Roster

On 12 June 2012, the Australian roster for the women's water polo tournament was announced.

№	Name	Pos.	Height	Weight	Date of birth	2012 club
1	Victoria Brown	GK	1.83 m (6 ft 0 in)	76 kg (168 lb)	27 July 1985	(Australia) Victorian Tigers
2	Gemma Beadsworth	CF	1.80 m (5 ft 11 in)	79 kg (174 lb)	17 July 1987	(Australia) Fremantle Marlins
3	Sophie Smith	CB	1.81 m (5 ft 11 in)	68 kg (150 lb)	26 February 1986	(Australia) Queensland Breakers
4	Holly Lincoln-Smith	CF	1.83 m (6 ft 0 in)	82 kg (181 lb)	26 March 1988	(Australia) Cronulla Sharks
5	Jane Moran	D	1.67 m (5 ft 6 in)	70 kg (154 lb)	6 June 1985	(Australia) Brisbane Barracudas
6	Bronwen Knox	CF	1.82 m (6 ft 0 in)	88 kg (194 lb)	16 April 1986	(Australia) Victorian Tigers
7	Rowena Webster	CB	1.78 m (5 ft 10 in)	80 kg (176 lb)	27 December 1987	(Australia) Victorian Tigers
8	Kate Gynther	D	1.75 m (5 ft 9 in)	73 kg (161 lb)	5 July 1982	(Australia) Brisbane Barracudas
9	Glencora Ralph	CB	1.78 m (5 ft 10 in)	67 kg (148 lb)	8 August 1988	(Australia) Fremantle Marlins
10	Ashleigh Southern	CF	1.88 m (6 ft 2 in)	94 kg (207 lb)	22 October 1992	(Australia) Brisbane Barracudas
11	Melissa Rippon	D	1.69 m (5 ft 7 in)	70 kg (154 lb)	20 January 1981	(Australia) Brisbane Barracudas
12	Nicola Zagame	D	1.74 m (5 ft 9 in)	72 kg (159 lb)	11 August 1990	(Australia) Cronulla Sharks
13	Alicia McCormack	GK	1.68 m (5 ft 6 in)	72 kg (159 lb)	7 June 1983	(Australia) Cronulla Sharks

Head coach: Greg McFadden

Group play

Team	Pld	W	D	L	GF	GA	GD	Pts
Australia	3	3	0	0	37	19	+18	6
Russia	3	2	0	1	22	21	+1	4
Italy	3	1	0	2	22	22	0	2
Great Britain	3	0	0	3	14	33	−19	0

30 July 2012; 15:30	Report	Italy	8–10	Australia	Water Polo Arena, London; Referees: Steven Rotsart (USA), Gyorgy Juhasz (HUN)
30 July 2012; 15:30	Report	Score by quarters: 1–2, 3–2, 0–4, 4–2			Water Polo Arena, London; Referees: Steven Rotsart (USA), Gyorgy Juhasz (HUN)
30 July 2012; 15:30	Report	Di Mario, Radicchi 2	Goals	Gynther 3	Water Polo Arena, London; Referees: Steven Rotsart (USA), Gyorgy Juhasz (HUN)

1 August 2012; 19:40	Report	Great Britain	3–16	Australia	Water Polo Arena, London; Referees: Gus Pinker (RSA), Denis Danelon (BRA)
1 August 2012; 19:40	Report	Score by quarters: 1–3, 1–3, 1–5, 0–5			Water Polo Arena, London; Referees: Gus Pinker (RSA), Denis Danelon (BRA)
1 August 2012; 19:40	Report	Wilcox 2	Goals	Webster 5	Water Polo Arena, London; Referees: Gus Pinker (RSA), Denis Danelon (BRA)

3 August 2012; 15:30	Report	Russia	8–11	Australia	Water Polo Arena, London; Referees: Dragan Stampalja (CRO), Marie Deslieres (CAN)
3 August 2012; 15:30	Report	Score by quarters: 4–6, 1–2, 1–0, 2–3			Water Polo Arena, London; Referees: Dragan Stampalja (CRO), Marie Deslieres (CAN)
3 August 2012; 15:30	Report	Lisunova 3	Goals	Gynther 2	Water Polo Arena, London; Referees: Dragan Stampalja (CRO), Marie Deslieres (CAN)

Quarter-final

5 August 2012; 16:10	Report	China	18–20 (OT, PSO)	Australia	Water Polo Arena, London; Referees: Georgios Stavridis (GRE), Dragan Stampalija (CRO)
5 August 2012; 16:10	Report	Score by quarters: 5–5, 3–3, 4–2, 2–4 OT: 1–2, 1–0 PSO: 2–4			Water Polo Arena, London; Referees: Georgios Stavridis (GRE), Dragan Stampalija (CRO)
5 August 2012; 16:10	Report	Ma Huanhuan 4	Goals	Ralph, Zagame 3	Water Polo Arena, London; Referees: Georgios Stavridis (GRE), Dragan Stampalija (CRO)

Semi-final

7 August 2012; 15:30	Report	United States	11–9 (OT)	Australia	Water Polo Arena, London; Referees: Ulrich Spiegel (GER), Marie Deslieres (CAN)
7 August 2012; 15:30	Report	Score by quarters: 3–3, 3–2, 1–1, 2–3 OT: 2–0, 0–0			Water Polo Arena, London; Referees: Ulrich Spiegel (GER), Marie Deslieres (CAN)
7 August 2012; 15:30	Report	Steffens 4	Goals	Southern 4	Water Polo Arena, London; Referees: Ulrich Spiegel (GER), Marie Deslieres (CAN)

Bronze medal

9 August 2012; 18:40	Report	(bronze) Australia	13–11 (OT)	Hungary	Water Polo Arena, London; Referees: Adrian Alexandrescu (ROU), Dragan Stampalija (CRO)
9 August 2012; 18:40	Report	Score by quarters: 2–1, 5–3, 3–4, 1–3 OT: 1–0, 1–0			Water Polo Arena, London; Referees: Adrian Alexandrescu (ROU), Dragan Stampalija (CRO)
9 August 2012; 18:40	Report	Beadsworth 4	Goals	Keszthelyi 3	Water Polo Arena, London; Referees: Adrian Alexandrescu (ROU), Dragan Stampalija (CRO)

== Weightlifting ==
Australia won 2 quotas in weightlifting.

Athlete	Event	Snatch		Clean & Jerk		Total	Rank
Athlete	Event	Result	Rank	Result	Rank	Total	Rank
Damon Kelly	Men's +105 kg	165	16	216	13	381	16
Seen Lee	Women's −63 kg	83	7	103	7	186	7

== Wrestling ==
Australia qualified one quota place.

Key:

- VF – Victory by Fall.
- PP – Decision by Points – the loser with technical points.
- PO – Decision by Points – the loser without technical points.

Men's freestyle

Athlete	Event	Qualification	Round of 16	Quarterfinal	Semifinal	Repechage 1	Repechage 2	Final / BM	
Athlete	Event	Opposition Result	Opposition Result	Opposition Result	Opposition Result	Opposition Result	Opposition Result	Opposition Result	Rank
Farzad Tarash	−60 kg	Bye	Ri J-M (PRK); L 0–3 ^{PO}	Did not advance					19

== Media coverage ==
Nine Network and Foxtel won the television rights. Nine Network showed more than 300 hours of coverage over the 16 days. There was live coverage generally from 18:30 to 09:00 (Australian Eastern Standard Time) and a highlights package from 09:00 to 11:00 and 16:00 to 18:00 (AEST).

Foxtel had eight dedicated channels and showed 1,100 hours of live events, with a total coverage of 3,200 hours. Macquarie Radio Network and Australian Broadcasting Corporation Radio are the radio rights holders.
