= Jankovec (surname) =

Jankovec (feminine: Jankovcová) is a Czech and Slovak surname. Notable people with the surname include:

- Ludmila Jankovcová (1897–1990), née Stračovská, Czech politician
- Martin Jankovec (born 1987), Slovak canoeist
