= David Smith (canoeist) =

Australian sprint canoeist (born 1987)

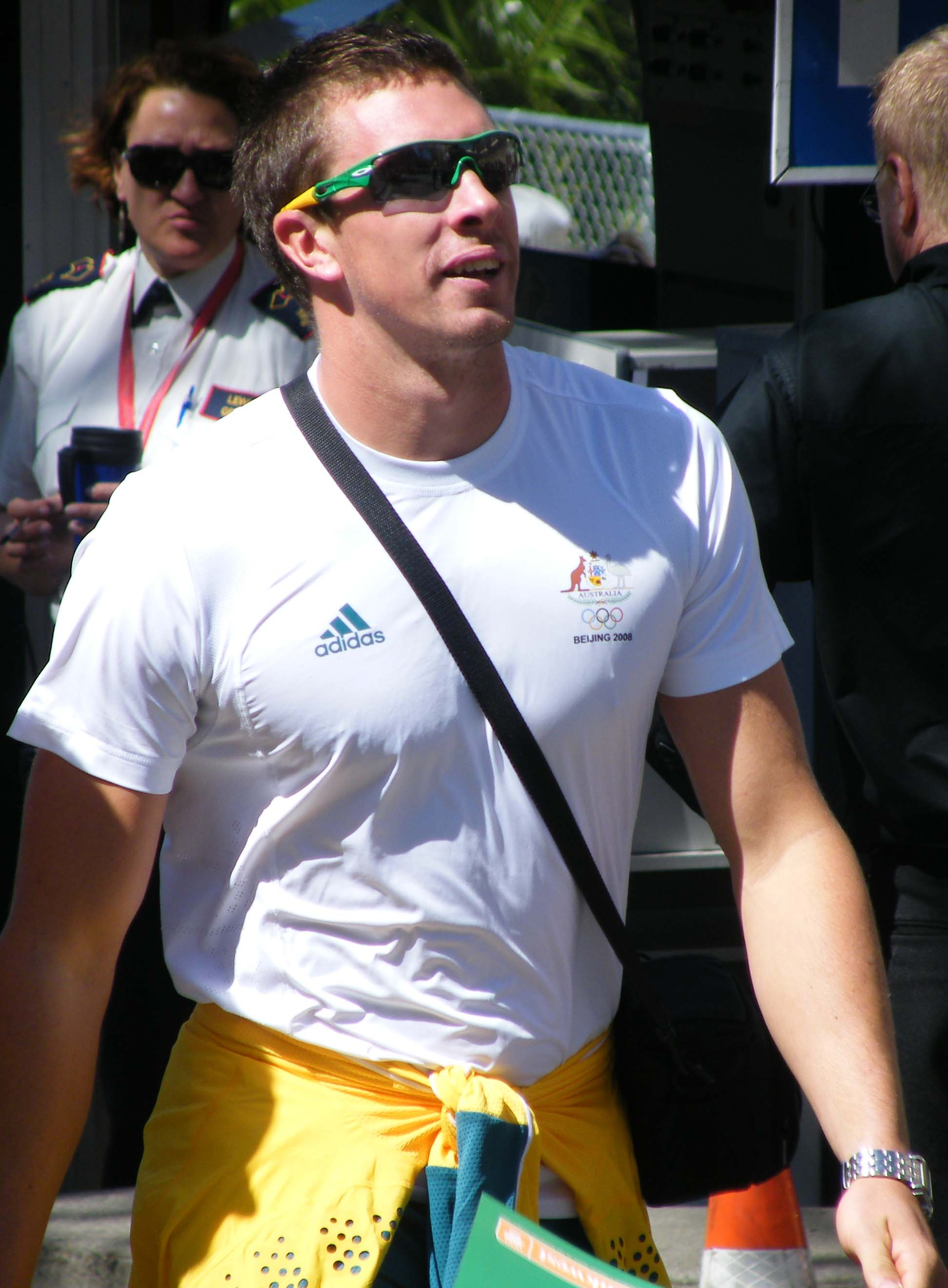
- Smith in 2008

Personal information
- Full name: David William Smith
- Born: 13 February 1987 (age 39) Shellharbour, New South Wales, Australia
Medal record
Men's canoe sprint
Representing Australia
Olympic Games
Gold medal – first place	2012 London	K-4 1000 m
World Championships
Silver medal – second place	2009 Dartmouth	K-2 1000 m
Silver medal – second place	2011 Szeged	K-4 1000m
Bronze medal – third place	2013 Duisburg	K–4 1000 m

David William Smith OAM (born 13 February 1987 in Shellharbour) is an Australian sprint canoeist who has competed since the late 2000s. He won a silver medal in the K-2 1000 m event at the 2009 ICF Canoe Sprint World Championships in Dartmouth. He also won a silver at the 2011 ICF World Championships in Szeged, Hungary in the K-4 1000m, and then a bronze in the same event in 2013.

Smith competed in the K-4 1000 m event at the 2008 Summer Olympics in Beijing, but was eliminated in the semifinals. He was the member of Champion Australia's Kayak Four (K4) 1000m team in the London Olympics 2012, with Tate Smith (no relation), Murray Stewart and Jacob Clear.
