= Canoeing at the 2012 Summer Olympics – Men's K-4 1000 metres =

Men's canoe sprint K-4 1,000 metres at the Games of the XXX Olympiad
- Venue: Eton Dorney
- Date: 7 to 9 August
- Competitors: 40 from 10 nations
- Winning time: 2:55.085

Medalists
1st place, gold medalist(s)		Tate Smith; Dave Smith; Murray Stewart; Jacob Clear	Australia
2nd place, silver medalist(s)		Zoltán Kammerer; Dávid Tóth; Tamás Kulifai; Dániel Pauman	Hungary
3rd place, bronze medalist(s)		Daniel Havel; Lukáš Trefil; Josef Dostál; Jan Štěrba	Czech Republic

The men's canoe sprint K-4 1,000 metres competition at the 2012 Olympic Games in London took place between 7 and 9 August at Eton Dorney.

The Australian team comprising Tate Smith, Dave Smith, Murray Stewart and Jacob Clear won the gold medal. Hungary won the silver medal and the Czech Republic took bronze.

== Competition format ==
The competition comprised heats, a semi-final, and a final. Heat winners advanced to the final, with all other boats getting a second chance in the semi-final. The top six from the semi-final also advanced to the final.

== Schedule ==
All times are British Summer Time (UTC+01:00)

Date	Time	Round
Tuesday 7 August 2012	09:30; 11:01	Heats; Semi-finals
Thursday 9 August 2012	09:48	Final

== Results ==
=== Heats ===
The fastest boat qualified for the final, remainder to a semi-final.

==== Heat 1 ====
Rank	Canoer	Country	Time	Notes
1	Peter Gelle; Martin Jankovec; Erik Vlček; Juraj Tarr	Slovakia	2:55.173	Q
2	Marcus Groß; Norman Bröckl; Tim Wieskötter; Max Hoff	Germany	2:56.987	
3	Kim Wraae Knudsen; René Holten Poulsen; Emil Stær; Kasper Bleibach	Denmark	3:05.134	
4	Traian Neagu; Toni Ioneticu; Ștefan Vasile; Ionel Gavrilă	Romania	3:12.371	
5	Milenko Zorić; Ervin Holpert; Aleksandar Aleksić; Dejan Terzić	Serbia	3:21.437	

==== Heat 2 ====
Rank	Canoer	Country	Time	Notes
1	Zoltán Kammerer; Dávid Tóth; Tamás Kulifai; Dániel Pauman	Hungary	2:54.153	Q
2	Daniel Havel; Lukáš Trefil; Josef Dostál; Jan Štěrba	Czech Republic	2:54.267	
3	Tate Smith; Dave Smith; Murray Stewart; Jacob Clear	Australia	2:59.789	
4	Ilya Medvedev; Anton Vasilev; Anton Ryakhov; Oleg Zhestkov	Russia	3:04.781	
5	Zhang Hongpeng; Zhou Peng; Shen Jie; Huang Zhipeng	China	3:14.234	

=== Semifinal ===
The fastest six boats qualified for the final.

Rank	Canoer	Country	Time	Notes
1	Tate Smith; Dave Smith; Murray Stewart; Jacob Clear	Australia	2:52.505	Q
2	Marcus Groß; Norman Bröckl; Tim Wieskötter; Max Hoff	Germany	2:53.575	Q
3	Daniel Havel; Lukáš Trefil; Josef Dostál; Jan Štěrba	Czech Republic	2:53.984	Q
4	Ilya Medvedev; Anton Vasilev; Anton Ryakhov; Oleg Zhestkov	Russia	2:54.303	Q
5	Traian Neagu; Toni Ioneticu; Ștefan Vasile; Ionel Gavrilă	Romania	2:55.027	Q
6	Kim Wraae Knudsen; René Holten Poulsen; Emil Stær; Kasper Bleibach	Denmark	2:56.003	Q
7	Milenko Zorić; Ervin Holpert; Aleksandar Aleksić; Dejan Terzić	Serbia	2:56.346	
8	Zhang Hongpeng; Zhou Peng; Shen Jie; Huang Zhipeng	China	3:00.315	

=== Final ===
Rank	Canoer	Country	Time	Notes
1st place, gold medalist(s)	Tate Smith; Dave Smith; Murray Stewart; Jacob Clear	Australia	2:55.085	
2nd place, silver medalist(s)	Zoltán Kammerer; Dávid Tóth; Tamás Kulifai; Dániel Pauman	Hungary	2:55.699	
3rd place, bronze medalist(s)	Daniel Havel; Lukáš Trefil; Josef Dostál; Jan Štěrba	Czech Republic	2:55.850	
4	Marcus Groß; Norman Bröckl; Tim Wieskötter; Max Hoff	Germany	2:56.172	
5	Kim Wraae Knudsen; René Holten Poulsen; Emil Stær; Kasper Bleibach	Denmark	2:56.542	
6	Peter Gelle; Martin Jankovec; Erik Vlček; Juraj Tarr	Slovakia	2:56.771	
7	Ilya Medvedev; Anton Vasilev; Anton Ryakhov; Oleg Zhestkov	Russia	2:57.375	
8	Traian Neagu; Toni Ioneticu; Ștefan Vasile; Ionel Gavrilă	Romania	2:58.223	
