= Martin Jankovec =

Slovak canoeist

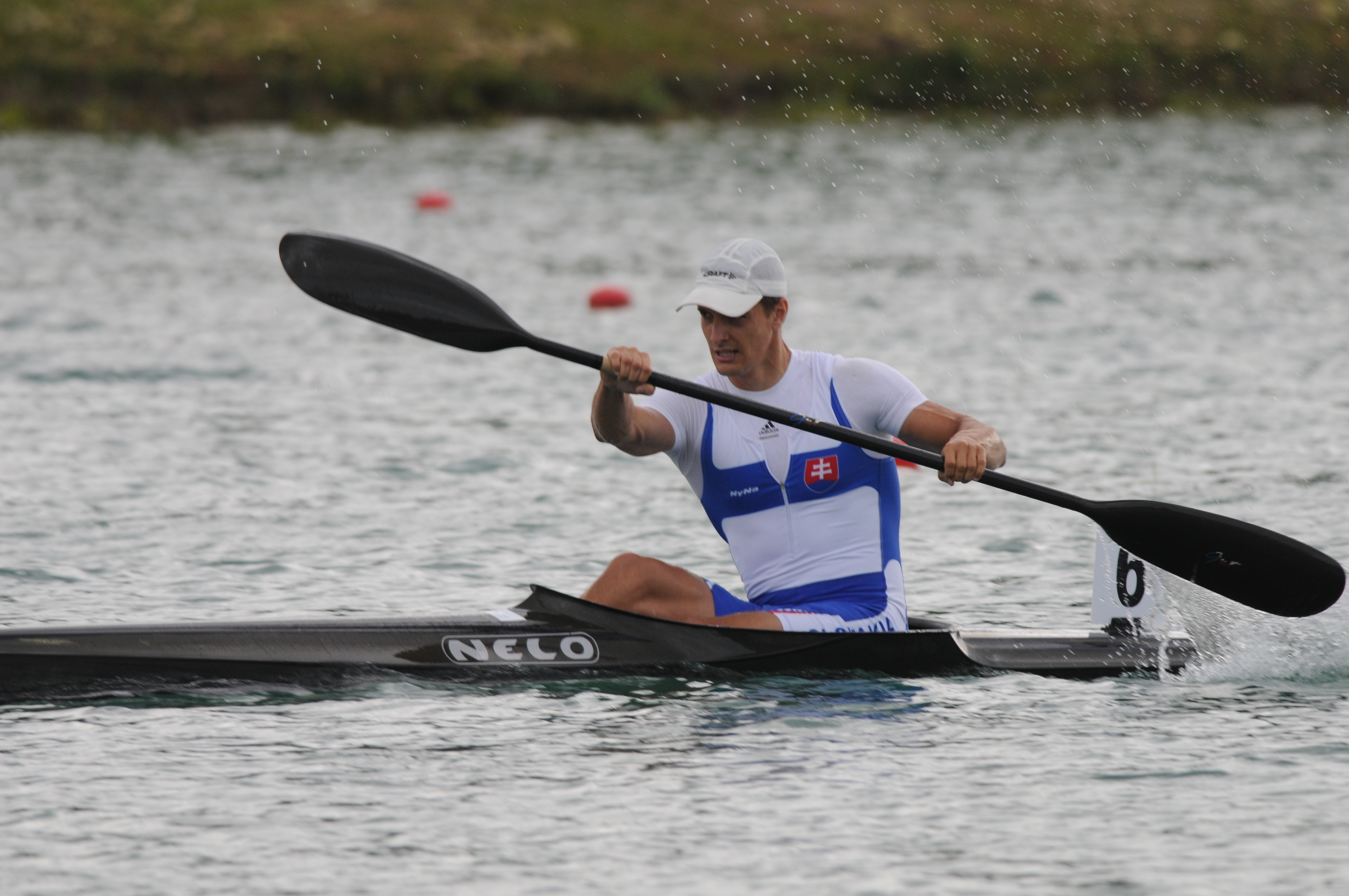
Photo of Martin Jankovec

Martin Jankovec (born 25 August 1987 in Trenčín) is a Slovak sprint canoeist. At the 2012 Summer Olympics, he competed in the Men's K-4 1000 metres, finishing in 6th place with the team in the final.
