= Aleksandar Aleksić =

Serbian canoeist

Aleksandar Aleksić Александар Алексић
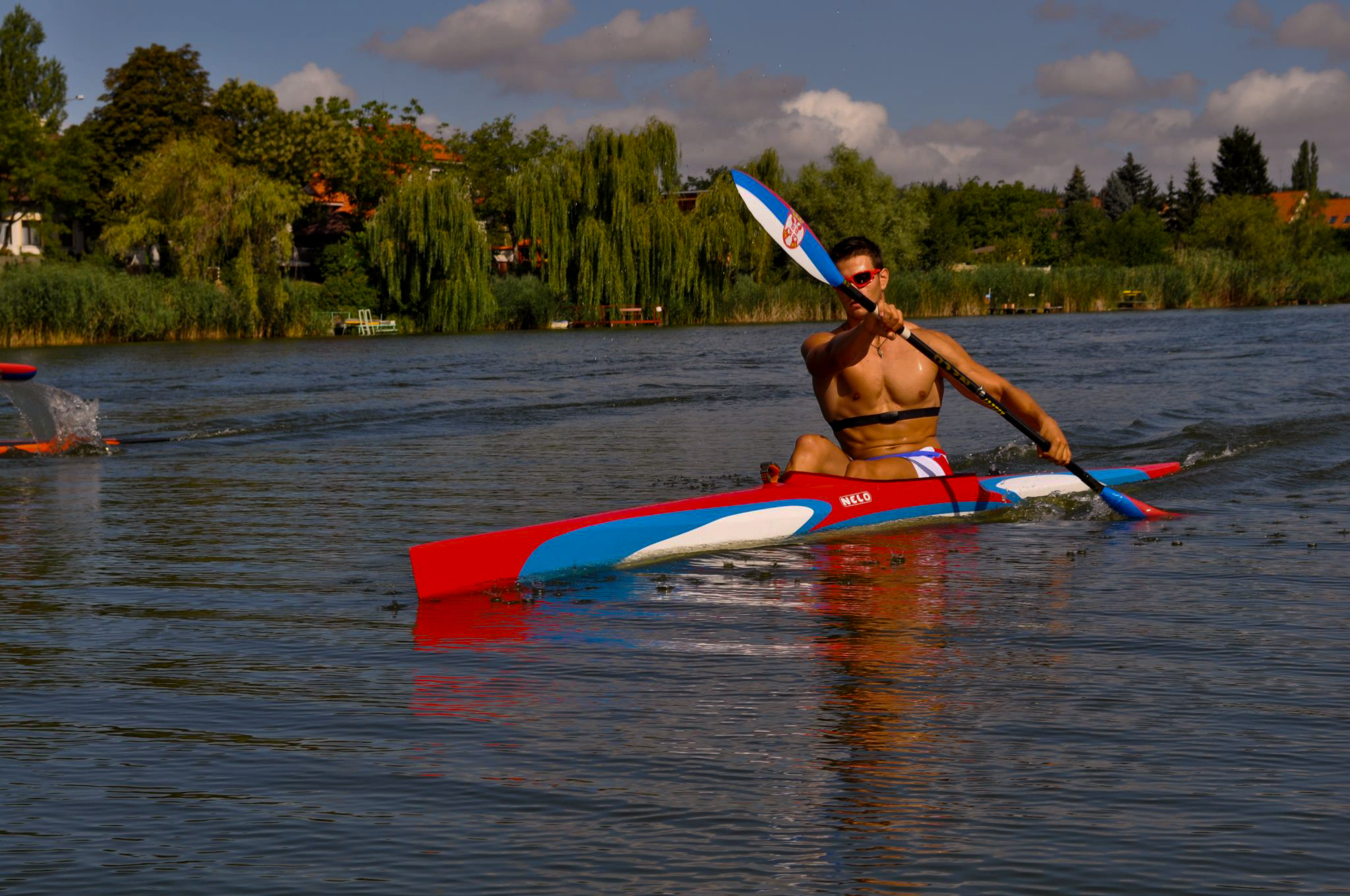
- Aleksic in Szolnok, 2012

Personal information
- Nationality: Serbian
- Born: 13 April 1992 (age 34) Šabac, Serbia
- Height: 1.89 m (6 ft 2 in)
- Weight: 89 kg (196 lb)

Sport
- Sport: Canoe racing
- Club: "Zorka" Šabac
Medal record
Men's canoe sprint
Representing Serbia
European Championships
Bronze medal – third place	2012 Zagreb	K4 1000 m

Aleksandar Aleksić (Serbian Cyrillic: Александар Алексић; born 13 April 1992) is a retired Serbian sprint canoer.

He won a bronze medal in the K4 1000 m event at the 2012 Canoe Sprint European Championships in Zagreb. For this result, he got a Serbian sports lifetime pension and an award for promoting Serbia internationally.

== Biography ==
Aleksandar was born in Šabac, Serbia on 13 April 1992. He began canoeing in 2004 when he was 12.

The best results of his career so far are a bronze medal at the 2012 European Championship and 9th place in the Olympic Games in 2012. He was also fifth in the World Championship and achieved one win on the first stage of the World Cup 2013 held in Szeged.

He was 6th in the K4 1000 m at the 2013 World Championship.

When he was in junior category, his best result was 4th place at European championships in 2009.

Aleksandar was a Red Bull sponsored athlete from 2013 to 2014.

He is retired from competition.
