= Tate Smith =

Australian canoeist

Personal information
- Born: 18 November 1981 (age 44) Sydney NSW
- Height: 186 cm (6 ft 1 in)
- Weight: 92 kg (203 lb)

Sport
- Country: Australia
- Sport: Kayaking
- Event: K-4 1000m - Men
Medal record
Men's canoe sprint
Olympic Games
Gold medal – first place	2012 London	K-4 1000 m
World Championships
Silver medal – second place	2011 Szeged	K-4 1000 m
Bronze medal – third place	2013 Duisburg	K–4 1000 m
- Updated on 9 February 2014

Tate Aaron Smith OAM (born 19 November 1981) is an Australian sprint canoeist who competed in the late 2000s. At the 2008 Summer Olympics in Beijing, he was eliminated in the semifinals of the K-4 1000 m event.

At the 2012 Summer Olympics, he was part of the Australian K-4 team that won the gold medal.

In July 2014 Smith tested positive for the banned substance Stanozolol, receiving a two-year ban.
