= Jacob Clear =

Australian sprint canoeist

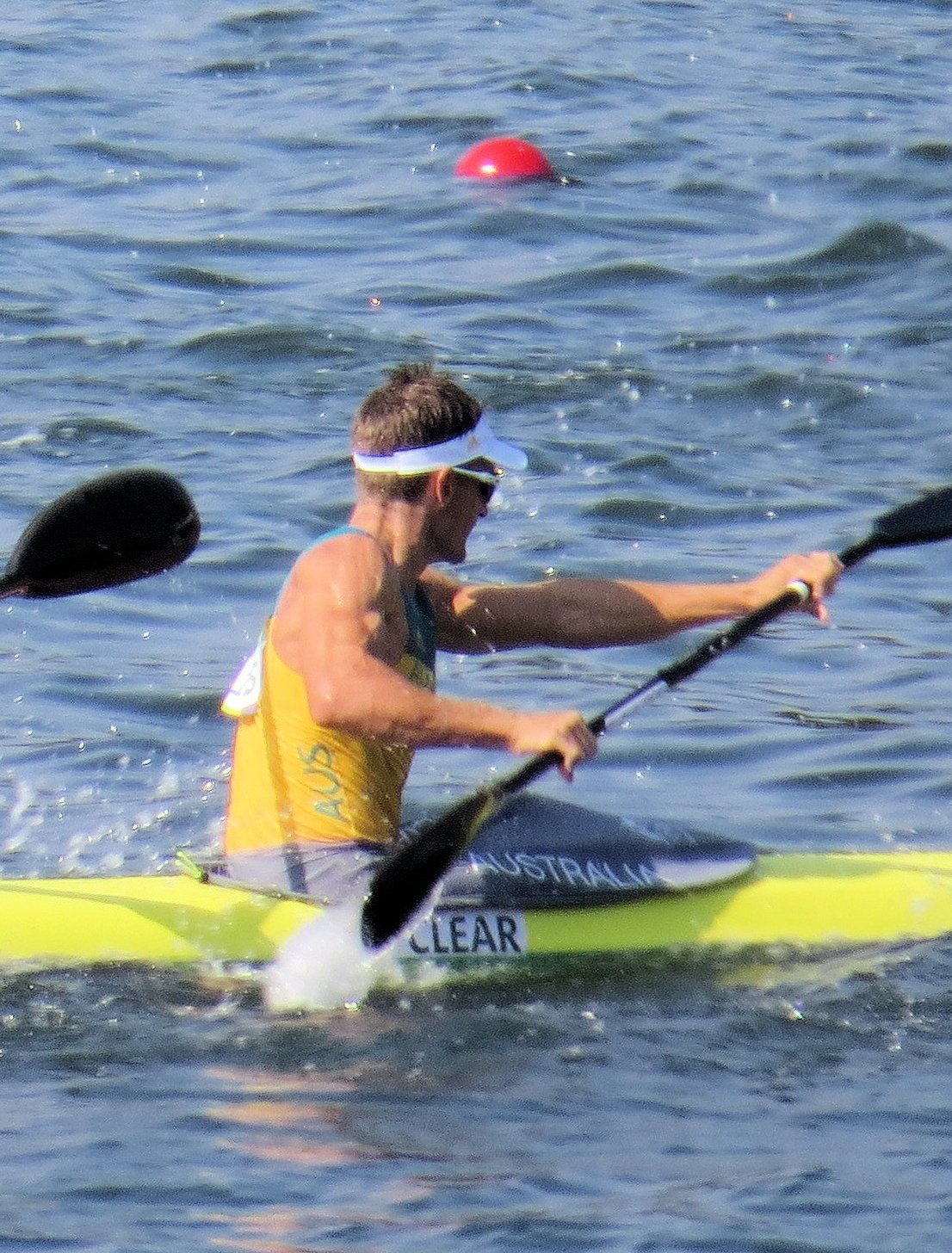

Personal information
- Born: 18 January 1985 (age 41) Sydney NSW
- Height: 185 cm (6 ft 1 in)
- Weight: 86 kg (190 lb)

Sport
- Country: Australia
- Sport: Kayaking
- Event: K-4 1000m - Men
Medal record
Men's canoe sprint
Olympic Games
Gold medal – first place	2012 London	K-4 1000 m
World Championships
Silver medal – second place	2011 Szeged	K–4 1000 m
Bronze medal – third place	2013 Duisburg	K–4 1000 m
- Updated on 9 February 2014

Jacob Peter Clear OAM (born 18 January 1985) is an Australian sprint canoeist who competed in the late 2000s. At the 2008 Summer Olympics in Beijing, he was eliminated in the semifinals of the K-2 500 m event. He was a member of the gold medal-winning Australian Kayak Four (K4) 1000m team in the London Olympics 2012.

Clear was a life-saving nipper from the age of 5 and began kayaking at the age of 21. His early achievements are documented on the Olympics website.
