= Canoeing at the 2012 Summer Olympics =

Coordinates: 51.6883°N 0.0156°W

Canoeing at the Games of the XXX Olympiad
- Pictograms for slalom (left) and sprint (right)
- Venue: Lee Valley White Water Centre (slalom); Eton Dorney (sprint)
- Dates: 29 July – 2 August 2012 (slalom); 6–11 August 2012 (sprint)
- Competitors: 330

Canoeing at the 2012 Summer Olympics in London were contested in two main disciplines: canoe slalom, from 29 July to 2 August, and canoe sprint, from 6 to 11 August. The slalom competition was held at the Lee Valley White Water Centre and the sprint events were staged at Eton College Rowing Centre, at Dorney Lake, known as Eton Dorney.

Around 330 athletes took part in 16 events. The men's 500m sprints were replaced by a 200m race; in addition, the men's C-2 500m was replaced by a women's K-1 200m sprint. This was confirmed at an International Canoe Federation board meeting at Windsor, Berkshire, on 5 December 2009. For the first time, women competed in two individual events in sprint canoeing. Because of the changes, the finals were spread over a three-day period instead of the traditional two days which had been in effect since the 1976 Games. The most successful nation in the slalom was France, with two gold medals in the four events, followed by Great Britain with one gold and one silver. In the sprint, Hungary was the most successful with three gold, two silver and one bronze medal, while Germany topped the medal table overall, with three gold, two silver and three bronze medals.

== Qualification ==
A new qualification system was created for both slalom and sprint canoeing at the 2012 Games. The quotas were set for each event by the International Canoe Federation in July 2010.

== Competition schedule ==
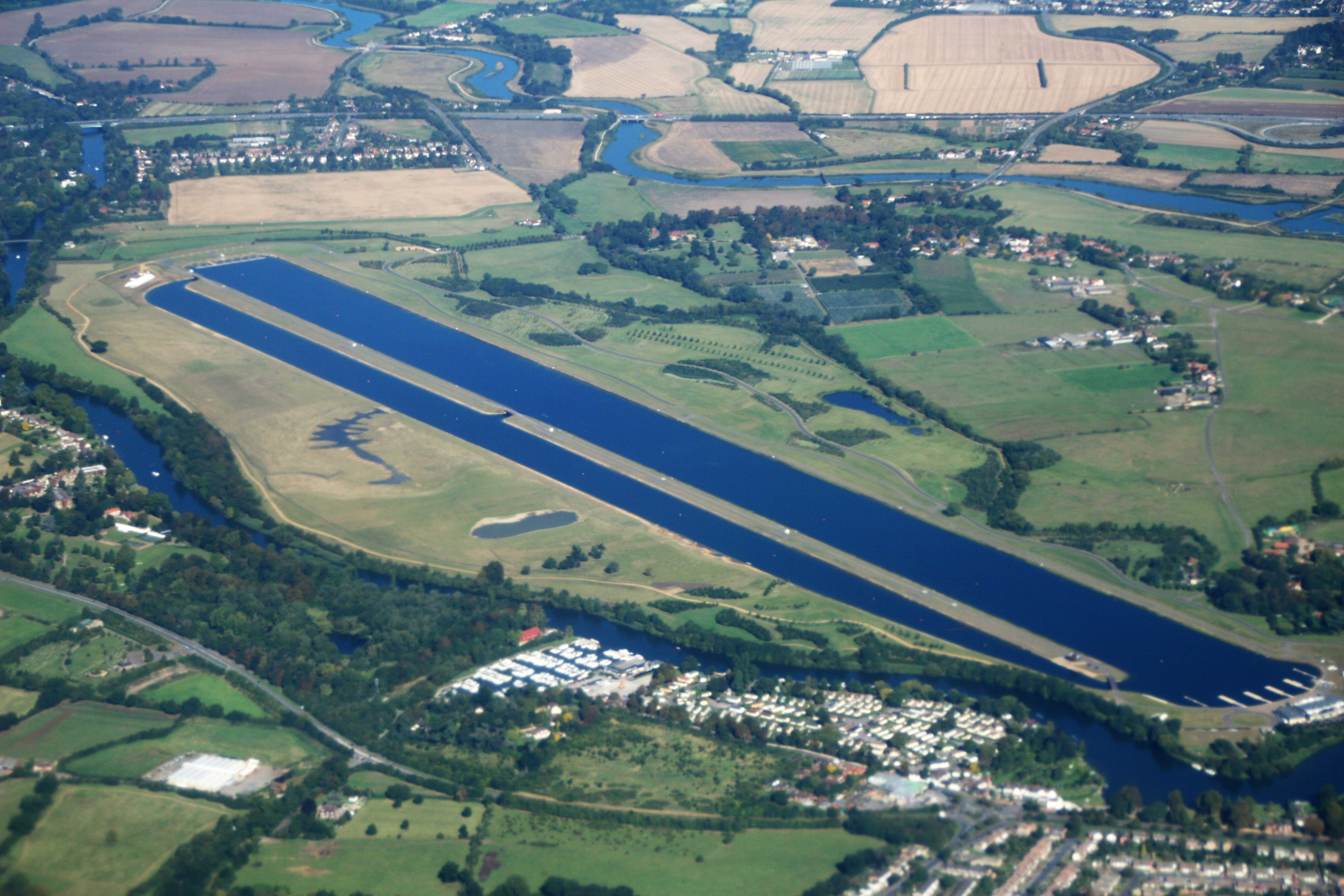
Eton Dorney, in Buckinghamshire, was the venue for the sprint discipline.

H	Heats	½	Semifinals	F	Final

Slalom
Event↓/Date →	Sun 29	Mon 30	Tue 31		Wed 1		Thu 2	
Men's C-1	H		½	F				
Men's C-2		H					½	F
Men's K-1	H				½	F		
Women's K-1		H					½	F

Sprint
Event↓/Date →	Mon 6		Tue 7		Wed 8	Thu 9	Fri 10		Sat 11
Men's C-1 200 m							H	½	F
Men's C-1 1000 m	H	½			F				
Men's C-2 1000 m			H	½		F			
Men's K-1 200 m							H	½	F
Men's K-1 1000 m	H	½			F				
Men's K-2 200 m							H	½	F
Men's K-2 1000 m	H	½			F				
Men's K-4 1000 m			H	½		F			
Women's K-1 200 m							H	½	F
Women's K-1 500 m			H	½		F			
Women's K-2 500 m			H	½		F			
Women's K-4 500 m	H	½			F				

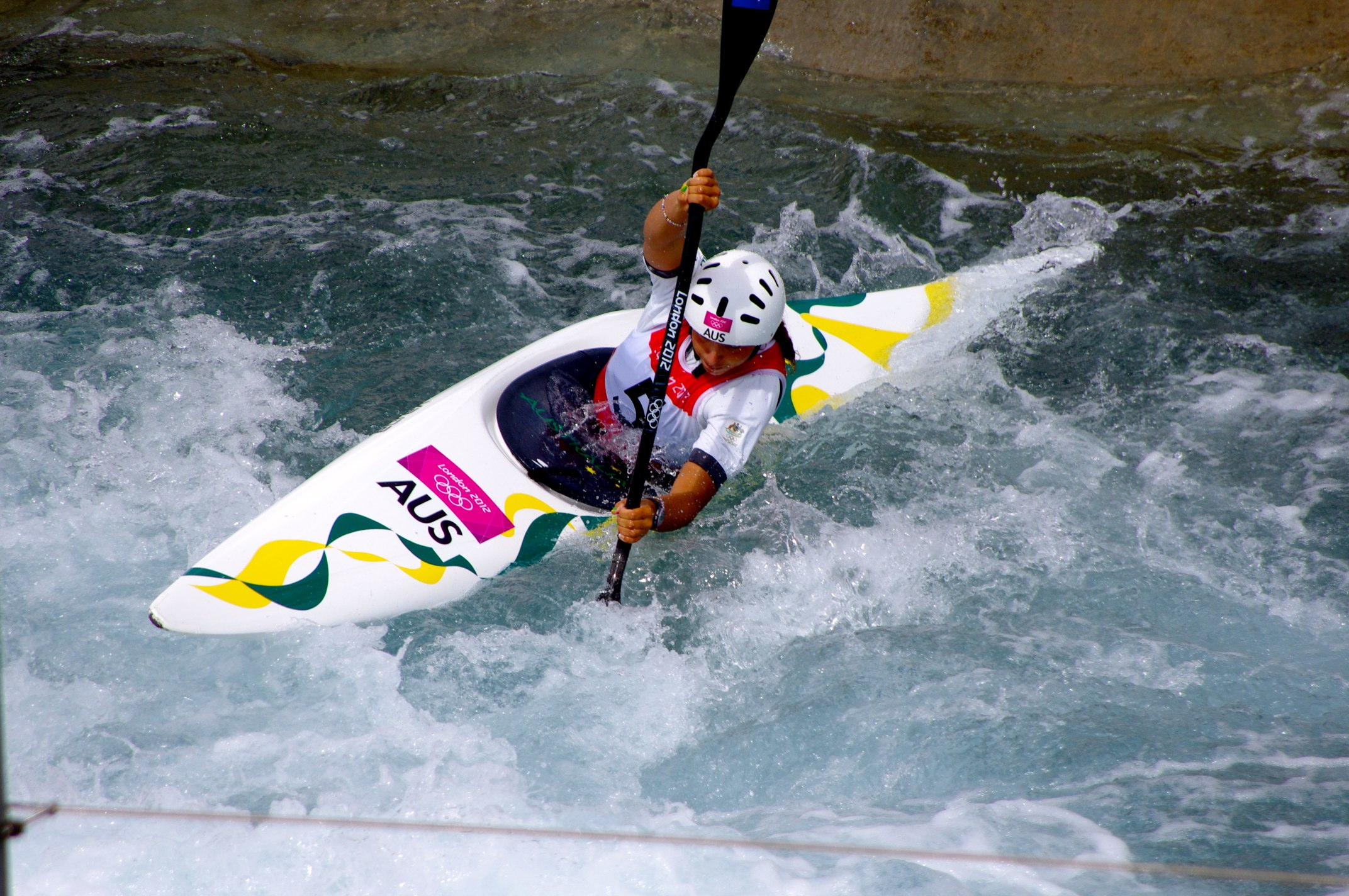
Jessica Fox competing at the 2012 Olympics in K1

== Medal summary ==
=== By event ===
==== Slalom ====
Games	Gold	Silver	Bronze
Men's C-1	Tony Estanguet; France	Sideris Tasiadis; Germany	Michal Martikán; Slovakia
Men's C-2	Timothy Baillie; Etienne Stott; Great Britain	David Florence; Richard Hounslow; Great Britain	Pavol Hochschorner; Peter Hochschorner; Slovakia
Men's K-1	Daniele Molmenti; Italy	Vavřinec Hradilek; Czech Republic	Hannes Aigner; Germany
Women's K-1	Émilie Fer; France	Jessica Fox; Australia	Maialen Chourraut; Spain

==== Sprint ====
Men

Games	Gold	Silver	Bronze
C-1 200 m	Yuriy Cheban; Ukraine	Ivan Shtyl; Russia ^{[a]}	Alfonso Benavides; Spain
C-1 1000 m	Sebastian Brendel; Germany	David Cal; Spain	Mark Oldershaw; Canada
C-2 1000 m	Peter Kretschmer and Kurt Kuschela; Germany	Aliaksandr Bahdanovich and Andrei Bahdanovich; Belarus	Alexey Korovashkov and Ilya Pervukhin; Russia
K-1 200 m	Ed McKeever; Great Britain	Saúl Craviotto; Spain	Mark de Jonge; Canada
K-1 1000 m	Eirik Verås Larsen; Norway	Adam van Koeverden; Canada	Max Hoff; Germany
K-2 200 m	Alexander Dyachenko and Yury Postrigay; Russia	Raman Piatrushenka and Vadzim Makhneu; Belarus	Liam Heath and Jon Schofield; Great Britain
K-2 1000 m	Rudolf Dombi and Roland Kökény; Hungary	Fernando Pimenta and Emanuel Silva; Portugal	Andreas Ihle and Martin Hollstein; Germany
K-4 1000 m	Australia; Tate Smith; Dave Smith; Murray Stewart; Jacob Clear	Hungary; Zoltán Kammerer; Dávid Tóth; Tamás Kulifai; Dániel Pauman	Czech Republic; Daniel Havel; Lukáš Trefil; Josef Dostál; Jan Štěrba

Women

Games	Gold	Silver	Bronze
K-1 200 m	Lisa Carrington; New Zealand	Inna Osypenko; Ukraine	Nataša Dušev-Janić; Hungary
K-1 500 m	Danuta Kozák; Hungary	Inna Osypenko; Ukraine	Bridgitte Hartley; South Africa
K-2 500 m	Franziska Weber and Tina Dietze; Germany	Katalin Kovács and Natasa Dusev-Janics; Hungary	Beata Mikołajczyk and Karolina Naja; Poland
K-4 500 m	Hungary; Gabriella Szabó; Danuta Kozák; Katalin Kovács; Krisztina Fazekas Zur	Germany; Carolin Leonhardt; Franziska Weber; Katrin Wagner-Augustin; Tina Dietze	Belarus; Iryna Pamialova; Nadzeya Papok; Volha Khudzenka; Maryna Pautaran

- ^{Sprint Men's C-1 200 m} On 12 June 2019, the IOC stripped Lithuanian canoeist Jevgenij Shuklin of his silver medal.

=== Gallery ===
Gallery of some of the gold medalists in the canoeing events:

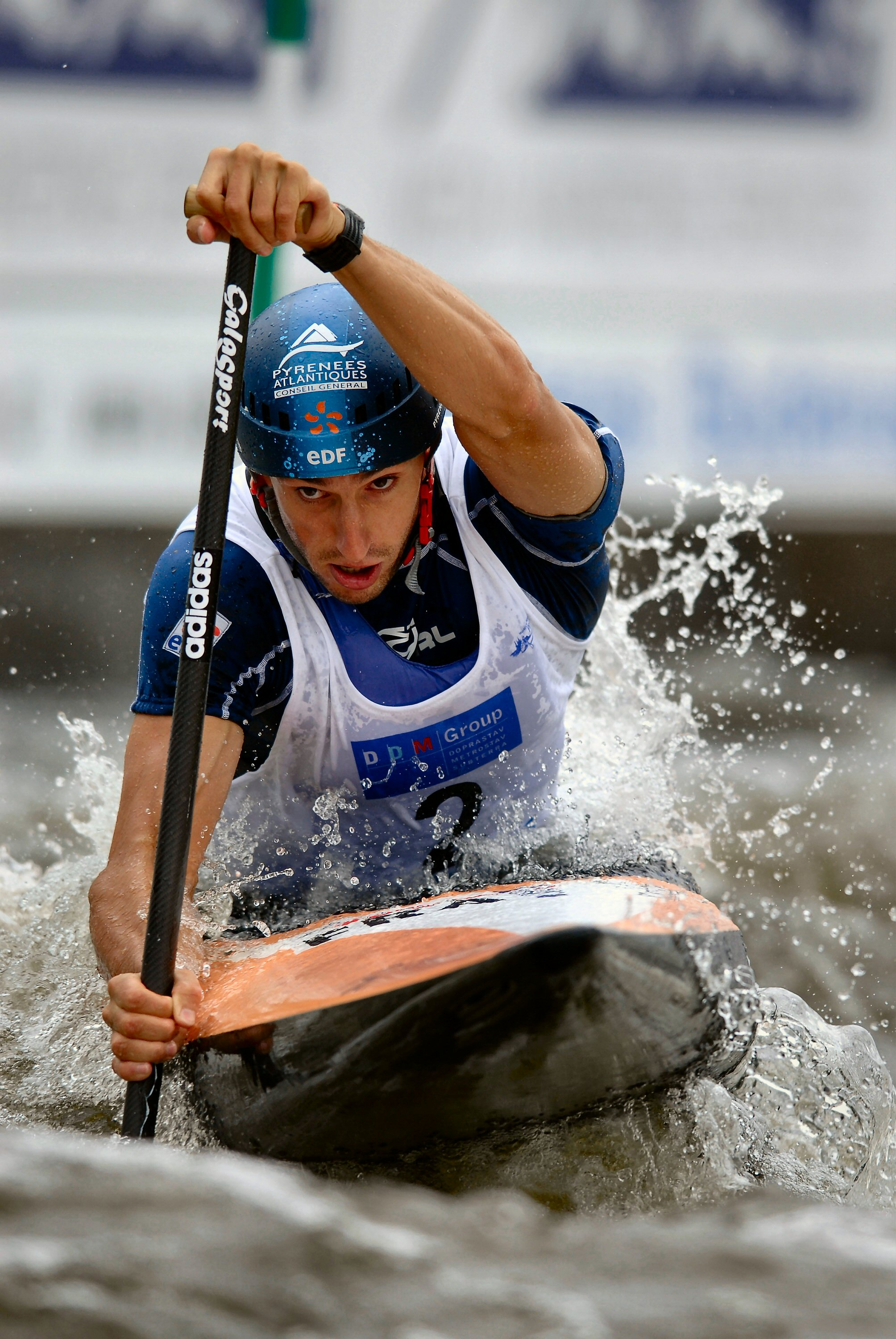
Tony Estanguet, pictured in 2006, won the men's C-1 slalom for France

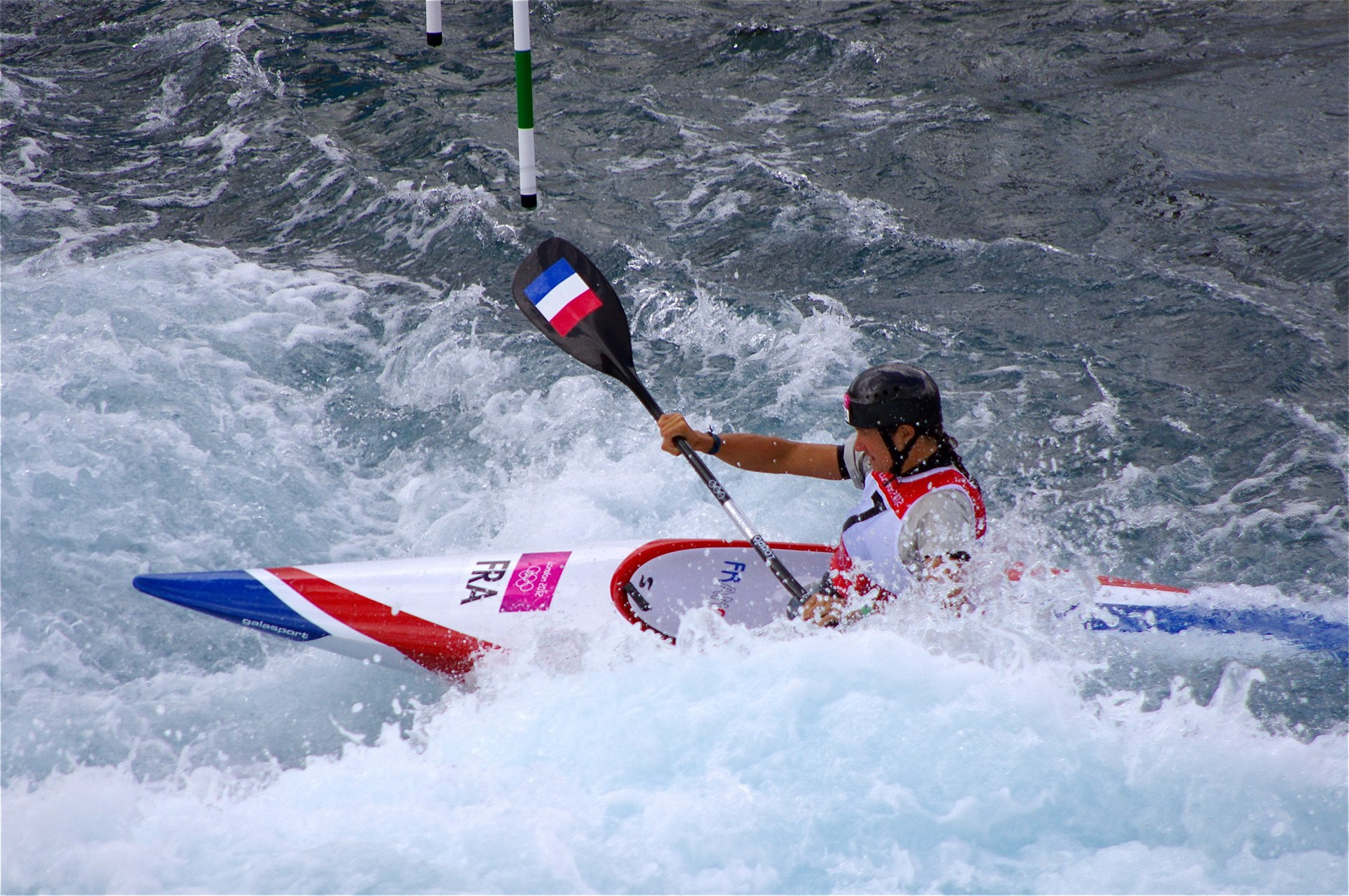
Émilie Fer, also from France, pictured winning the women's K-1 slalom

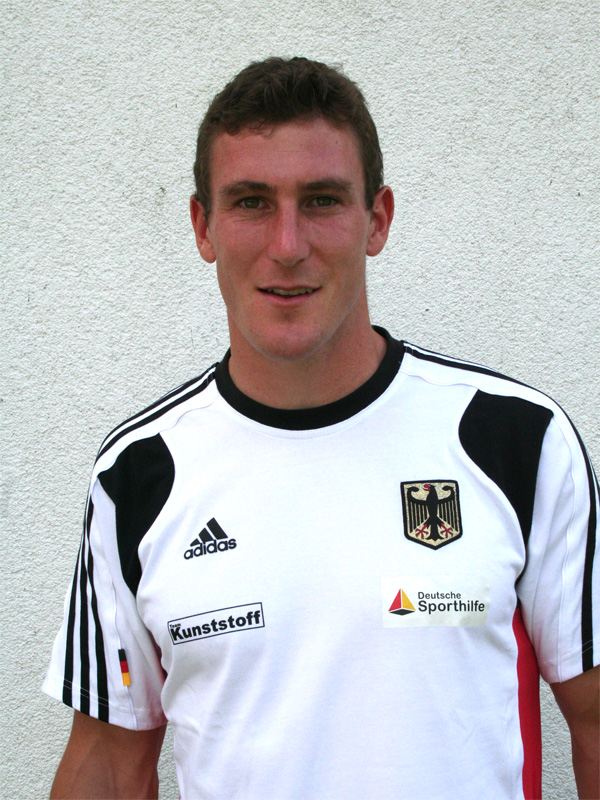
Sebastian Brendel, of Germany, won gold in the men's C-1 1,000m sprint

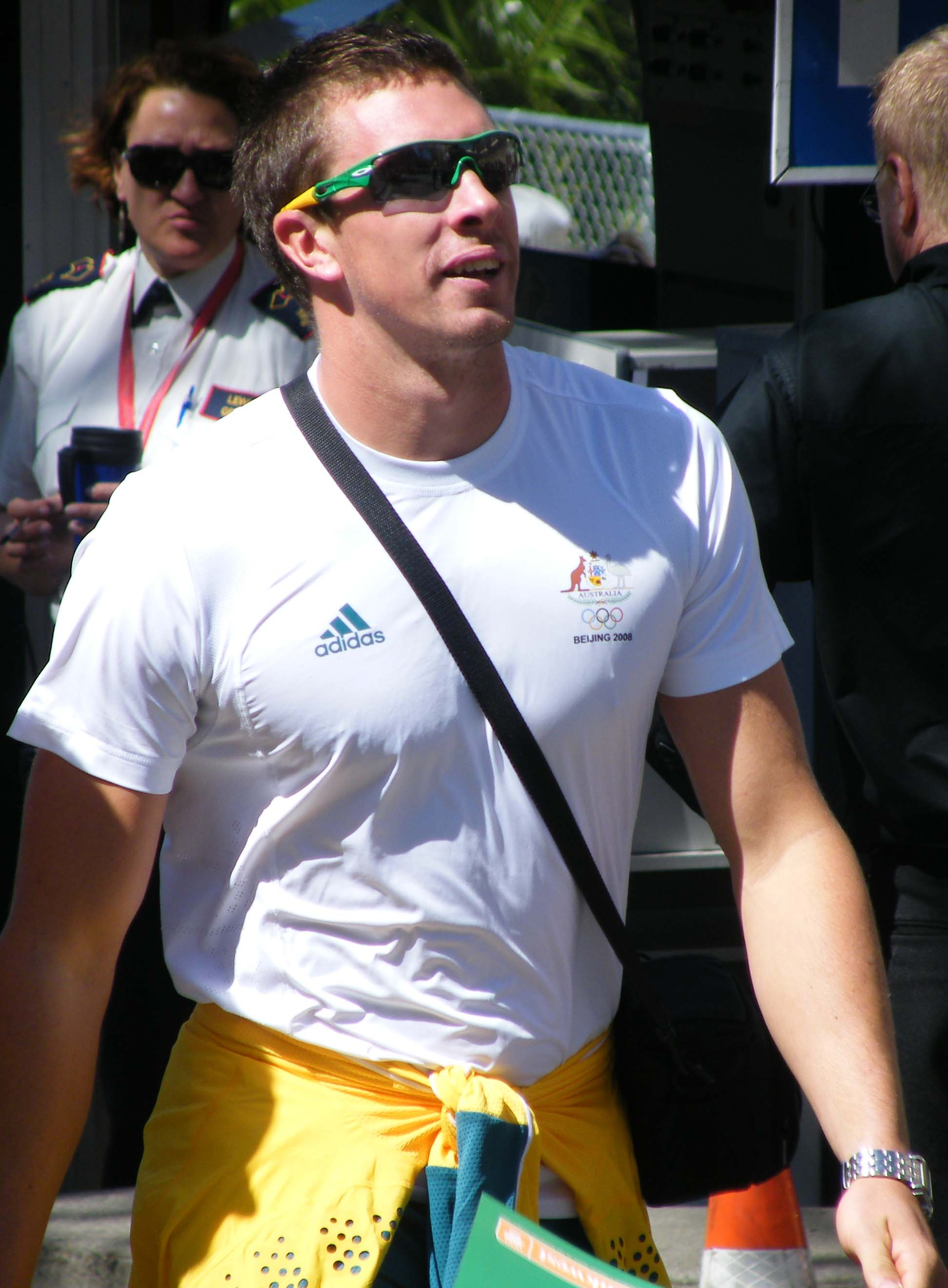
David Smith was part of the Australian team that won the men's K-4 1,000m sprint

=== By nation ===
Rank	Nation	Gold	Silver	Bronze	Total
1	Germany	3	2	3	8
2	Hungary	3	2	1	6
3	Great Britain	2	1	1	4
4	France	2	0	0	2
5	Ukraine	1	2	0	3
6	Russia	1	1	1	3
7	Australia	1	1	0	2
8	Italy	1	0	0	1
8	New Zealand	1	0	0	1
8	Norway	1	0	0	1
11	Spain	0	2	2	4
12	Belarus	0	2	1	3
13	Canada	0	1	2	3
14	Czech Republic	0	1	1	2
15	Portugal	0	1	0	1
16	Slovakia	0	0	2	2
17	Poland	0	0	1	1
17	South Africa	0	0	1	1
Totals (18 entries)		16	16	16	48
