= Canoeing at the 2012 Summer Olympics – Qualification =

Canoeing at the 2012 Summer Olympics, qualifying phase

This article details the Canoeing at the 2012 Summer Olympics qualifying phase. A new qualification system has been set up for both slalom and sprint canoeing at these games. The quotas were set for each event by the International Canoe Federation in July 2010.

== Qualification summary ==
NOC	Slalom				Sprint												Total	
NOC	K1 M	C1 M	C2 M	K1 W	Men								Women				Boats	Athletes
NOC	K1 M	C1 M	C2 M	K1 W	K1 200	K1 1000	K2 200	K2 1000	K4 1000	C1 200	C1 1000	C2 1000	K1 200	K1 500	K2 500	K4 500	Boats	Athletes
Angola												X					1	2
Argentina					X		X										2	2
Australia	X	X	X	X	X		X		X	X		X	X	X		X	12	21
Austria	X			X											X		3	4
Azerbaijan										X		X					2	3
Belarus						X	X			X	X	X				X	6	11
Belgium	X				X			X									3	4
Brazil				X								X					2	3
Bulgaria						X											1	1
Canada	X				X	X		X		X	X		X	X			8	8
China	X	X	X	X	X				X		X	X		X	X	X	11	19
Cook Islands				X													1	1
Croatia	X																1	1
Cuba						X						X	X		X		4	6
Czech Republic	X	X	X	X					X			X					6	11
Denmark					X				X					X			3	6
Ecuador					X												1	1
Finland													X	X			2	2
France	X	X	X	X	X	X	X				X					X	9	14
Germany	X	X	X	X	X	X	X	X	X		X	X	X	X	X	X	15	21
Great Britain	X	X	X	X	X	X	X				X		X	X		X	11	14
Greece		X															1	1
Hungary					X			X	X		X		X	X	X	X	8	14
Iran						X							X				2	2
Ireland	X			X						X							3	3
Italy	X	X	X	X		X							X	X			7	8
Japan	X	X		X			X						X	X	X		7	7
Kazakhstan		X						X		X				X			4	5
Latvia							X										1	2
Lithuania					X					X							2	2
Mexico											X						1	1
Morocco				X													1	1
New Zealand	X			X		X		X					X	X	X		7	9
Nigeria	X																1	1
Norway						X								X			2	2
Poland	X	X	X	X	X					X		X	X		X		9	12
Portugal						X		X					X	X	X	X	6	6
Romania							X		X		X	X			X		5	11
Russia			X	X	X		X	X	X	X	X	X	X	X	X	X	13	19
Serbia					X	X			X				X		X	X	6	12
Singapore														X			1	1
Slovakia		X	X	X				X	X	X					X		7	12
Slovenia	X	X	X	X									X				5	6
South Africa		X			X						X		X	X			5	5
Spain	X	X		X						X	X		X				6	6
Sweden						X		X					X		X		4	6
Switzerland	X			X													2	2
Thailand	X																1	1
Togo	X																1	1
Tunisia						X				X				X			3	3
Ukraine										X			X	X			3	3
United States	X	X	X	X	X									X			6	7
Uzbekistan											X			X	X		3	3
Total: 53 NOCs	22	16	12	21	16	15	10	10	10	13	13	12	18	20	14	10	234	325

== Slalom ==
For the slalom events, the men competed in C-1, C-2, and K-1. Women competed in K-1 only. Qualifications were allocated to NOCs, not to specific competitors.

=== Qualification timeline ===
Event	Date	Venue
2011 ICF Canoe Slalom World Championships	September 7–11, 2011	Bratislava, Slovakia
2011 Asian Canoe Slalom Championships	December 16–18, 2011	Miyi, China
2012 African Canoeing Championships	February 3–4, 2012	Bethlehem, South Africa
2012 Oceania Canoeing Championships	February 24–26, 2012	Penrith, Australia
2012 Canoe Slalom Pan American Championships	March 10–11, 2012	Foz do Iguassu, Brazil
2012 Canoe Slalom European Championships	May 9–13, 2012	Augsburg, Germany

=== Qualification table ===
Event	K1 Men	C1 Men	C2 Men	K1 Women
World Championships	France; Slovenia; Germany; Czech Republic; Italy; Poland; Belgium; Spain; Switzerland; United States; New Zealand; Austria; Japan; Great Britain; China	Czech Republic; Germany; Slovakia; Spain; France; Japan; China; Poland; Great Britain; Slovenia; Russia	France; Slovakia; Russia; Slovenia; Great Britain; Poland; Czech Republic; Germany	Spain; Austria; Czech Republic; Slovakia; Great Britain; Poland; Russia; Slovenia; Germany; France; Australia; Italy; China; New Zealand; United States
Asian Championships	Thailand	Kazakhstan	China	Japan
African Championships	Nigeria	~~South Africa~~	—	Morocco
Oceania Championships	Australia	Australia	Australia	Cook Islands
American Championships	Canada	United States	United States	Brazil
European Championships	Ireland; Croatia	Greece; Italy	Italy	Ireland; Switzerland
Tripartite Invite	Togo	Argentina	—	—
Additional	—	—	Great Britain; Czech Republic	—
Total	22	17	14	21

== Sprint ==
=== Qualification timeline ===
Event	Date	Venue
2011 ICF Canoe Sprint World Championships	August 17–21, 2011	Szeged, Hungary
2011 All-Africa Games	September 9–10, 2011	Maputo, Mozambique
2011 Asian Canoe Sprint Championships	October 13–16, 2011	Tehran, Iran
2011 Pan American Games	October 26–29, 2011	Guadalajara, Mexico
2012 Oceania Canoeing championships	February 24–26, 2012	Penrith, Australia
European Qualifier	May 16–17, 2012	Poznań, Poland

=== Qualification table ===
NOCs are limited to one boat per event, and in kayaking to 8 men and 6 women positions. Qualification enables an NOC to participate, not necessarily in the person of the paddler who gained the qualification. Quotas given are for boats.

Event	2011 World Championships	Continental qualification					Total
Men Kayak	2011 World Championships	Europe	Americas	Asia	Africa	Oceania	Total
K1 200m	Poland; Great Britain; Germany; France; Russia; Canada; Ecuador; Hungary; Denmark	Belgium; Lithuania	United States	China; Japan	~~South Africa~~; Egypt; Tunisia	Australia; Cook Islands	14 +2
K1 1000m	Canada; Sweden; Norway; Germany; Belarus; Serbia; Bulgaria; Great Britain; New Zealand	France; Italy	Cuba	Iran; China	Tunisia; Egypt	Cook Islands; Australia	14 +1
K2 200m	France; Great Britain; Belarus; Romania; Germany; Latvia	Russia	Argentina; Canada	Japan; Kazakhstan	—	Australia	10
K2 1000m	Slovakia; Sweden; Russia; Belgium; Germany; Hungary	Portugal	Canada	Kazakhstan	—	New Zealand; Australia	10
K4 1000m	Germany; Australia; Russia; Slovakia; Romania; Czech Republic; Hungary; Serbia; Denmark; China	—	—	—	—	—	10
Event	2011 World Championships	Continental qualification					Total
Men Canoe	2011 World Championships	Europe	Americas	Asia	Africa	Oceania	Total
C1 200m	Azerbaijan; Russia; Spain; Ukraine; Lithuania; Belarus; Poland	Slovakia; Ireland	Canada; Brazil; Mexico	Japan; China; Kazakhstan	Tunisia; Angola; Senegal	Australia; Samoa	13
C1 1000m	Hungary; Spain; Uzbekistan; Belarus; Canada; Russia; France^ Great Britain^{*}	Germany; Romania	Mexico	Kazakhstan	~~South Africa~~; Senegal; Angola	Samoa; Australia	13
C2 1000m	Germany; Azerbaijan; Romania; Czech Republic; Russia; Belarus; Cuba	Poland	Brazil	China	Angola	Australia	12
Event	2011 World Championships	Continental qualification					Total
Women	2011 World Championships	Europe	Americas	Asia	Africa	Oceania	Total
K1 200m	New Zealand; Poland; Japan; Portugal; Great Britain; Russia; Hungary; Spain; Germany; Finland; Slovenia; Sweden	Ukraine; Italy	Cuba; United States	Iran; China; Singapore; Uzbekistan	South Africa; Tunisia	Australia	14 +4
K1 500m	Germany; Hungary; Ukraine; Kazakhstan; Australia; Portugal; Italy; Denmark; Finland; South Africa; Great Britain	Russia; Norway	United States; Cuba	Singapore; Uzbekistan; China; Iran	Tunisia	New Zealand	14 +5
K2 500m	Austria; Germany; Poland; Hungary; China; Romania; Russia; Slovakia; New Zealand; Portugal^ Serbia^	Sweden	Cuba	Japan	—	Australia	10 +5
K4 500m	Hungary; Germany; Belarus; Great Britain; Australia; Russia; Portugal; France; Serbia; China	—	—	—	—	—	10

^* Host quota

- Italic: National federation has qualified a boat but the athlete that did this was already counted in another boat
- ^: ICF decided that two of the events in Oceania needed to be reattributed to the World Championships lists because the events seen as invalid due to lack of eligible competitors.
