= Darryl Fitzgerald (disambiguation) =

Darryl Fitzgerald (born 1990) is a New Zealand canoeist.

Darryl Fitzgerald may also refer to:

- Darryl Fitzgerald, character in Almost Summer
- Darryl Fitzgerald, character in Terri (film)
