= Hungary at the 2012 Summer Olympics =

- IOC code: HUN
- NOC: Hungarian Olympic Committee
- Website: www.olimpia.hu (in Hungarian and English)

in London
- Competitors: 159 in 18 sports
- Flag bearers: Péter Biros (opening); Krisztián Pars (closing)
- Medals Ranked 10th: Gold 8 Silver 4 Bronze 6 Total 18

Summer Olympics appearances (overview)
- 1896; 1900; 1904; 1908; 1912; 1920; 1924; 1928; 1932; 1936; 1948; 1952; 1956; 1960; 1964; 1968; 1972; 1976; 1980; 1984; 1988; 1992; 1996; 2000; 2004; 2008; 2012; 2016; 2020; 2024; 2028

Other related appearances
- 1906 Intercalated Games

Hungary competed at the 2012 Summer Olympics in London, from 27 July to 12 August 2012. Hungarian athletes have competed at every Summer Olympic Games in the modern era, except the 1920 Summer Olympics in Antwerp, and the 1984 Summer Olympics in Los Angeles because of the Soviet boycott. The Hungarian Olympic Committee (Hungarian: Magyar Olimpiai Bizottság, MOB) sent the nation's smallest delegation to the Games since 1956 to London. A total of 159 athletes, 97 men and 62 women, competed in 18 sports.

Hungary originally left London with a total of 17 medals (8 gold, 4 silver, and 5 bronze), finishing tenth in the overall medal standings. Almost a third of the medals were awarded to the team in sprint canoeing, along with three in swimming, and two each in judo and wrestling. Three Hungarian athletes, all from sprint canoeing, won more than a single Olympic medal in London. For the first time since 1996, Hungary did not win an Olympic medal in men's water polo.

Among the nation's medalists were gymnast Krisztián Berki, who became the fourth Hungarian to claim the title in men's pommel horse, 24 years after the last Hungarian winner, and hammer thrower Krisztián Pars, who narrowly missed out on a medal in Beijing. Katalin Kovács, who won gold and silver in London, emerged as the greatest Hungarian sprint kayaker in history, with a total of eight Olympic medals. Multiple-time European champion László Cseh, who won bronze in London, became one of the most successful Hungarian swimmers in history, with a total of five Olympic medals. Meanwhile, former Olympic silver medalist Dániel Gyurta set a world record to win the gold in men's breaststroke swimming. Éva Risztov, who retired from the pool after competing two events, became an Olympic champion in women's open water marathon.

On 7 November 2012, the International Olympic Committee stripped Uzbek wrestler Soslan Tigiev of his bronze medal after he tested positive for the prohibited substance methylhexaneamine. Gábor Hatos, who lost to Tigiev in the final repechage bout, was subsequently awarded the bronze medal.

== Medalists ==
Medal	Name	Sport	Event	Date
Gold	Áron Szilágyi	Fencing	Men's sabre	29 July
Gold	Dániel Gyurta	Swimming	Men's 200 m breaststroke	1 August
Gold	Krisztián Berki	Gymnastics	Men's pommel horse	5 August
Gold	Krisztián Pars	Athletics	Men's hammer throw	5 August
Gold	Rudolf Dombi; Roland Kökény	Canoeing	Men's K-2 1000 m	8 August
Gold	Gabriella Szabó; Danuta Kozák; Katalin Kovács; Krisztina Fazekas	Canoeing	Women's K-4 500 m	8 August
Gold	Danuta Kozák	Canoeing	Women's K-1 500 m	9 August
Gold	Éva Risztov	Swimming	Women's 10 km open water	9 August
Silver	Miklós Ungvári	Judo	Men's 66 kg	29 July
Silver	Tamás Lőrincz	Wrestling	Men's Greco-Roman 66 kg	7 August
Silver	Zoltán Kammerer; Dávid Tóth; Tamás Kulifai; Dániel Pauman	Canoeing	Men's K-4 1000 m	9 August
Silver	Katalin Kovács; Natasa Dusev-Janics	Canoeing	Women's K-2 500 m	9 August
Bronze	Éva Csernoviczki	Judo	Women's 48 kg	28 July
Bronze	László Cseh	Swimming	Men's 200 m individual medley	2 August
Bronze	Péter Módos	Wrestling	Men's Greco-Roman 55 kg	5 August
Bronze	Natasa Dusev-Janics	Canoeing	Women's K-1 200 m	11 August
Bronze	Ádám Marosi	Modern pentathlon	Men's event	11 August
Bronze	Gábor Hatos	Wrestling	Men's freestyle 74 kg	7 November

Medals by sport
Sport	1st place, gold medalist(s)	2nd place, silver medalist(s)	3rd place, bronze medalist(s)	Total
Canoeing	3	2	1	6
Swimming	2	0	1	3
Athletics	1	0	0	1
Fencing	1	0	0	1
Gymnastics	1	0	0	1
Wrestling	0	1	2	3
Judo	0	1	1	2
Modern pentathlon	0	0	1	1
Total	8	4	6	18

Multiple medalists
Name	Sport	1st place, gold medalist(s)	2nd place, silver medalist(s)	3rd place, bronze medalist(s)	Total
Danuta Kozák	Canoeing	2	0	0	2
Katalin Kovács	Canoeing	1	1	0	2
Natasa Dusev-Janics	Canoeing	0	1	1	2

== Delegation ==
Magyar Olimpiai Bizottság (MOB) selected a team of 159 athletes, 97 men and 62 women, to compete in 18 sports; it was the nation's smallest delegation since 1956. Water polo and men's handball were the only team sports in which Hungary was represented. There was only a single competitor in road cycling, triathlon, and weightlifting. Swimming had the largest team by sport, with a total of 31 competitors.

The Hungarian team featured past Olympic champions, three of them defending their titles from Beijing (sprint kayakers Katalin Kovács and Nataša Dušev-Janić, and the men's national water polo team). Dusev-Janics, who won a total of three gold medals for Hungary, previously competed for the former Federal Republic of Yugoslavia in 2000. Six Hungarian athletes made their fifth Olympic appearances: sprint canoer and multiple-time Olympic champion Zoltán Kammerer, water polo player Tamás Kásás, table tennis player Krisztina Tóth, fencers Géza Imre and Aida Mohamed, and windsurfer Áron Gádorfalvi. Double trap shooter Richárd Bognár, at age 45, was the oldest athlete in the team, while butterfly swimmer Liliána Szilágyi was the youngest at age 15. Péter Biros, who led his water polo team to the gold medal in three consecutive Olympic Games, was the nation's flag bearer at the opening ceremony.

Other notable Hungarian athletes included swimmer and triple Olympic silver medalist László Cseh, pommel horse gymnast and two-time defending world champion Krisztián Berki, hammer thrower and multiple-time World Challenge champion Krisztián Pars, and sabre fencer Áron Szilágyi.

The following is the list of number of competitors participating in the Games:

Sport	Men	Women	Total
Athletics	10	8	18
Boxing	3	0	3
Canoeing	8	5	13
Cycling	2	1	3
Diving	0	2	2
Fencing	2	2	4
Gymnastics	2	1	3
Handball	16	0	16
Judo	4	4	8
Modern pentathlon	2	2	4
Rowing	4	0	4
Sailing	2	1	3
Shooting	2	1	3
Swimming	17	14	31
Synchronized swimming	0	2	2
Table tennis	2	2	4
Tennis	0	2	2
Triathlon	0	1	1
Water polo	13	13	26
Weightlifting	1	0	1
Wrestling	6	1	7
Total	97	62	159

Medals by date
Day	Date	1st place, gold medalist(s)	2nd place, silver medalist(s)	3rd place, bronze medalist(s)	Total
Day 1	28 July	0	0	1	1
Day 2	29 July	1	1	0	2
Day 3	30 July	0	0	0	0
Day 4	31 July	0	0	0	0
Day 5	1 August	1	0	0	1
Day 6	2 August	0	0	1	1
Day 7	3 August	0	0	0	0
Day 8	4 August	0	0	0	0
Day 9	5 August	2	0	1	3
Day 10	6 August	0	0	0	0
Day 11	7 August	0	1	0	1
Day 12	8 August	2	0	0	2
Day 13	9 August	2	2	0	4
Day 14	10 August	0	0	0	0
Day 15	11 August	0	0	2	2
Day 16	12 August	0	0	0	0
–	7 November	0	0	1	1
Total		8	4	6	18

== Athletics ==
Hungarian athletes have so far achieved qualifying standards in the following athletics events (up to a maximum of 3 athletes in each event at the 'A' Standard, and 1 at the 'B' Standard):

Key
- Note–Ranks given for track events are within the athlete's heat only
- Q = Qualified for the next round
- q = Qualified for the next round as a fastest loser or, in field events, by position without achieving the qualifying target
- NR = National record
- =PB = Equal personal best
- SB = Seasonal best
- N/A = Round not applicable for the event
- Bye = Athlete not required to compete in round

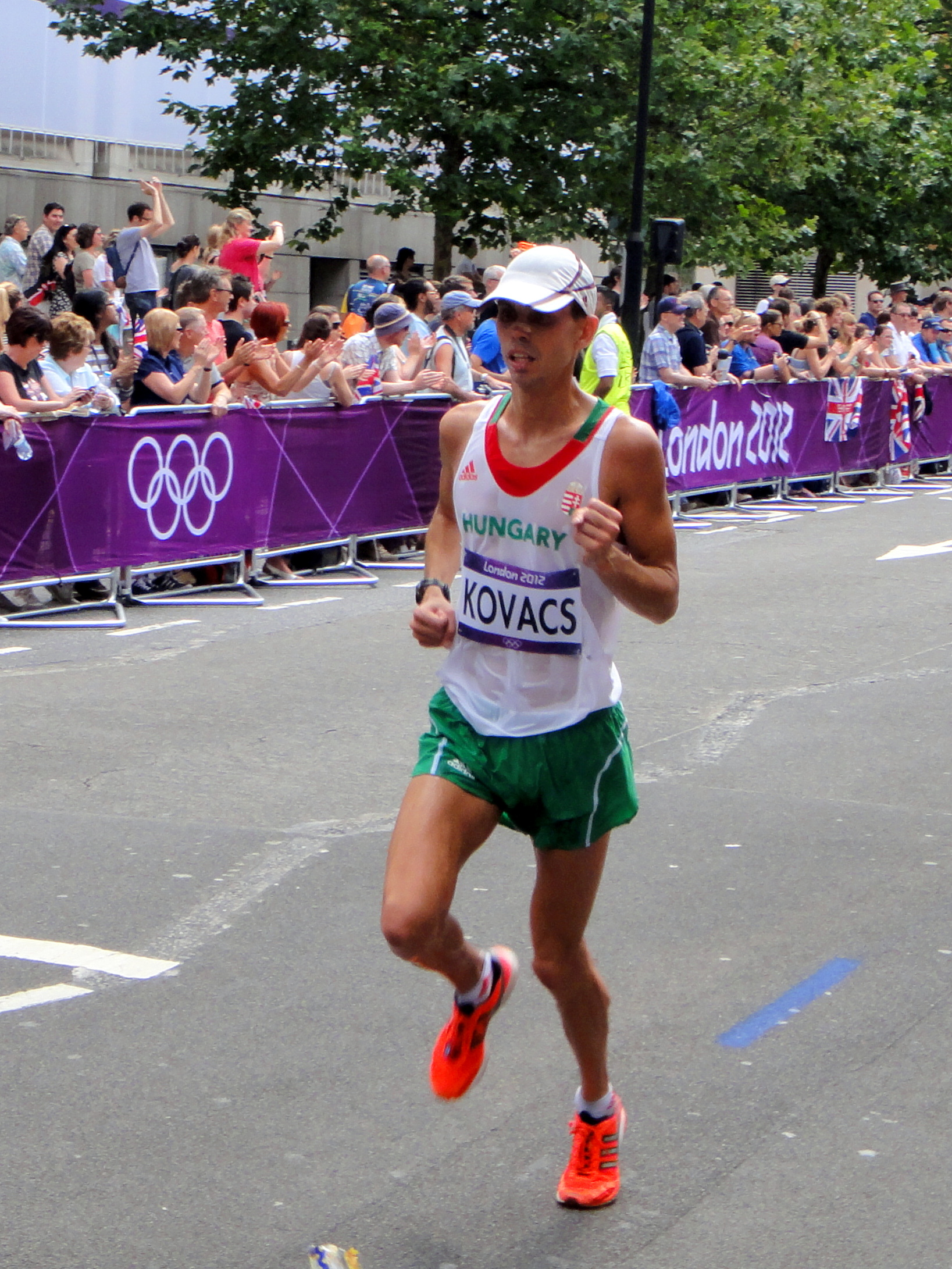
Tamás Kovács finished seventy-second in men's marathon.

Men
Track & road events

Athlete	Event	Heat		Semifinal		Final	
Athlete	Event	Result	Rank	Result	Rank	Result	Rank
Balázs Baji	110 m hurdles	13.76	5	Did not advance			
Marcell Deák-Nagy	400 m	46.17	4	Did not advance			
Máté Helebrandt	20 km walk	—N/a				1:23:32	32
Tamás Kazi	800 m	1:47.10 SB	6	Did not advance			
Dániel Kiss	110 m hurdles	13.62	6	Did not advance			
Tamás Kovács	Marathon	—N/a				2:27:48	72
Albert Minczér	3000 m steeplechase	8:40.74 SB	11	—N/a		Did not advance	

Field events

Athlete	Event	Qualification		Final	
Athlete	Event	Distance	Position	Distance	Position
Lajos Kürthy	Shot put	19.65	21	Did not advance	
Krisztián Pars	Hammer throw	79.37	1 Q	80.59	1st place, gold medalist(s)

Combined events – Decathlon

Athlete	Event	100 m	LJ	SP	HJ	400 m	110H	DT	PV	JT	1500 m	Final	Rank
Attila Szabó	Result	11.15	6.96	13.93	1.90	50.83	14.92	45.14	4.60 =PB	58.84	4:53.81	7581	24
Attila Szabó	Points	827	804	724	714	777	859	770	790	720	596	7581	24

Women
Track & road events

Athlete	Event	Final	
Athlete	Event	Result	Rank
Zsófia Erdélyi	Marathon	2:44:45	92
Anikó Kálovics	Marathon	2:45:55	95
Viktória Madarász	20 km walk	1:34:48	41
Beáta Rakonczai	Marathon	2:41:20	85

Field events

Athlete	Event	Qualification		Final	
Athlete	Event	Distance	Position	Distance	Position
Vanda Juhász	Javelin throw	50.01	36	Did not advance	
Anita Márton	Shot put	17.48	24	Did not advance	
Éva Orbán	Hammer throw	68.64	17	Did not advance	

Combined events – Heptathlon

Athlete	Event	100H	HJ	SP	200 m	LJ	JT	800 m	Final	Rank
Györgyi Farkas	Result	14.33	1.80	13.55	25.72	6.07	46.52	2:17.83	6013	22
Györgyi Farkas	Points	932	978	764	822	871	793	853	6013	22

== Boxing ==
Hungary has so far qualified boxers for the following events

Men

Athlete	Event	Round of 32	Round of 16	Quarterfinals	Semifinals	Final	
Athlete	Event	Opposition Result	Opposition Result	Opposition Result	Opposition Result	Opposition Result	Rank
Miklós Varga	Lightweight	Petrauskas (LTU); L 12–20	Did not advance				
Gyula Káté	Light welterweight	Mohamed (EGY); W 16–10	Mangiacapre (ITA); L 14–20	Did not advance			
Zoltán Harcsa	Middleweight	Espinoza (VEN); W 16–13	Kasuto (NAM); W 16–7	E Falcão (BRA); L 10–14	Did not advance		

== Canoeing ==
=== Sprint ===
Hungary has qualified boats for the following events

Men

Athlete	Event	Heats		Semifinals		Final	
Athlete	Event	Time	Rank	Time	Rank	Time	Rank
Miklós Dudás	K-1 200 m	35.323	3 Q	35.993	3 FA	36.830	6
Attila Vajda	C-1 200 m	44.761	5 Q	42.970	FB	44.466	11
Attila Vajda	C-1 1000 m	3:59.853	2 Q	3:52.365	2 FA	3:50.926	6
Rudolf Dombi; Roland Kökény	K-2 1000 m	3:11.393	1 FA	Bye		3:09.646	1st place, gold medalist(s)
Zoltán Kammerer; Tamás Kulifai; Dániel Pauman; Dávid Tóth	K-4 1000 m	2:54.153	1 FA	Bye		2:55.699	2nd place, silver medalist(s)

Women

Athlete	Event	Heats		Semifinals		Final	
Athlete	Event	Time	Rank	Time	Rank	Time	Rank
Nataša Dušev-Janić	K-1 200 m	41.221 OB	1 Q	40.570	1 FA	45.128	3rd place, bronze medalist(s)
Danuta Kozák	K-1 500 m	1:52.828	1 Q	1:50.469	1 FA	1:51.456	1st place, gold medalist(s)
Nataša Dušev-Janić; Katalin Kovács	K-2 500 m	1:43.984	1 Q	1:41.613	2 FA	1:43.278	2nd place, silver medalist(s)
Krisztina Fazekas; Katalin Kovács; Danuta Kozák; Gabriella Szabó	K-4 500 m	1:35.769	1 FA	Bye		1:30.827	1st place, gold medalist(s)

Legend: FA = Qualify to final (medal); FB = Qualify to final B (non-medal); OB = Olympic Best

== Cycling ==
=== Road ===
Athlete	Event	Time	Rank
Krisztián Lovassy	Men's road race	Did not finish	

=== Mountain biking ===
Athlete	Event	Time	Rank
András Parti	Men's cross-country	Did not finish	
Barbara Benkó	Women's cross-country	1:43:24	27

== Diving ==
Women

Athlete	Event	Preliminaries		Semifinals		Final	
Athlete	Event	Points	Rank	Points	Rank	Points	Rank
Nóra Barta	3 m springboard	257.70	25	Did not advance			
Flóra Gondos	3 m springboard	266.45	22	Did not advance			

== Fencing ==
Hungary has qualified 4 fencers.

Men

Athlete	Event	Round of 64	Round of 32	Round of 16	Quarterfinal	Semifinal	Final / BM	
Athlete	Event	Opposition Score	Opposition Score	Opposition Score	Opposition Score	Opposition Score	Opposition Score	Rank
Géza Imre	Individual épée	—N/a	El Haouari (MAR); W 15–8	Piasecki (NOR); L 7–15	Did not advance			
Áron Szilágyi	Individual sabre	Bye	Yu P K (MAS); W 15–1	Zhong M (CHN); W 15–10	Hartung (GER); W 15–13	Kovalev (RUS); W 15–7	Occhiuzzi (ITA); W 15–8	1st place, gold medalist(s)

Women

Athlete	Event	Round of 64	Round of 32	Round of 16	Quarterfinal	Semifinal	Final / BM	
Athlete	Event	Opposition Score	Opposition Score	Opposition Score	Opposition Score	Opposition Score	Opposition Score	Rank
Emese Szász	Individual épée	Bye	Choi I-J (KOR); L 12–15	Did not advance				
Aida Mohamed	Individual foil	Bye	Prescod (USA); W 15–10	Nam H-H (KOR); L 7–8	Did not advance			

== Gymnastics ==
=== Artistic ===
Hungary has qualified three athletes.

Men

Athlete	Event	Qualification								Final							
Athlete	Event	Apparatus						Total	Rank	Apparatus						Total	Rank
Athlete	Event	F	PH	R	V	PB	HB	Total	Rank	F	PH	R	V	PB	HB	Total	Rank
Krisztián Berki	Pommel horse	—N/a	15.033	—N/a				15.033	5 Q	—N/a	16.066	—N/a				16.066	1st place, gold medalist(s)
Vid Hidvégi	Pommel horse	—N/a	15.100	—N/a				15.100	3 Q	—N/a	14.300	—N/a				14.300	8

Women

Athlete	Event	Qualification						Final					
Athlete	Event	Apparatus				Total	Rank	Apparatus				Total	Rank
Athlete	Event	F	V	UB	BB	Total	Rank	F	V	UB	BB	Total	Rank
Dorina Böczögő	All-around	13.200	11.600	13.166	12.633	50.599	49	Did not advance					

== Handball ==
=== Men's tournament ===
The following is the Hungary roster in the men's handball tournament of the 2012 Summer Olympics.

Head coaches: Lajos Mocsai

No.	Pos.	Name	Date of birth (age)	Height	App.	Goals	Club
3	LB	Ferenc Ilyés	20 December 1981 (aged 30)	1.98 m			(Hungary) MKB Veszprém
5	CB	Gábor Császár	16 June 1984 (aged 28)	1.98 m			(Hungary) MKB Veszprém
6	RB	Tamás Mocsai	9 December 1978 (aged 33)	1.96 m			(Germany) TSV Hannover-Burgdorf
8	LW	Gergő Iváncsik	30 November 1981 (aged 30)	1.90 m			(Hungary) MKB Veszprém
10	RW	Gergely Harsányi	3 May 1981 (aged 31)	1.91 m			(Hungary) Tatabánya
11	LB	Barna Putics	18 August 1984 (aged 27)	2.01 m			(Germany) Gummersbach
12	GK	Nándor Fazekas	16 October 1976 (aged 35)	1.92 m			(Hungary) MKB Veszprém
14	LB	Carlos Pérez	26 August 1971 (aged 40)	1.98 m			(Hungary) MKB Veszprém
16	GK	Roland Mikler	20 September 1984 (aged 27)	1.90 m			(Hungary) Pick Szeged
17	RB	Balázs Laluska	20 June 1981 (aged 31)	2.01 m			(Hungary) MKB Veszprém
19	RB	László Nagy	3 March 1981 (aged 31)	2.09 m			(Spain) FC Barcelona
20	RW	Péter Gulyás	4 March 1984 (aged 28)	2.00 m			(Hungary) MKB Veszprém
24	LW	Attila Vadkerti	22 February 1982 (aged 30)	1.82 m			(Hungary) Pick Szeged
25	P	Szabolcs Zubai	31 March 1984 (aged 28)	1.93 m			(Hungary) Pick Szeged
28	P	Timuzsin Schuch	5 June 1985 (aged 27)	1.97 m			(Hungary) MKB Veszprém
66	CB	Máté Lékai	16 June 1988 (aged 24)	1.90 m			(Slovenia) Celje Pivovarna Laško

Group play

Team	Pld	W	D	L	GF	GA	GD	Pts	Qualification
Croatia	5	5	0	0	150	109	+41	10	Quarter-finals
Denmark	5	4	0	1	124	129	−5	8	Quarter-finals
Spain	5	3	0	2	140	126	+14	6	Quarter-finals
Hungary	5	2	0	3	114	128	−14	4	Quarter-finals
Serbia	5	1	0	4	120	131	−11	2	
South Korea	5	0	0	5	115	140	−25	0	

29 July 2012; 21:15	Hungary	25 – 27	Denmark	Copper Box, London; Attendance: 5,000; Referees: Lazaar, Reveret (FRA)
29 July 2012; 21:15	Császár 8	(10–13)	Eggert 9	Copper Box, London; Attendance: 5,000; Referees: Lazaar, Reveret (FRA)
29 July 2012; 21:15	1× (yellow card) 7× (suspension)	Report	3× (yellow card) 5× (suspension)	Copper Box, London; Attendance: 5,000; Referees: Lazaar, Reveret (FRA)

31 July 2012; 11:15	South Korea	19 – 22	Hungary	Copper Box, London; Attendance: 4,262; Referees: Nachevski, Nikolov (MKD)
31 July 2012; 11:15	Jeong Yi-kyeong, Jeong Han 4	(9–7)	Lékai 5	Copper Box, London; Attendance: 4,262; Referees: Nachevski, Nikolov (MKD)
31 July 2012; 11:15	4× (yellow card) 3× (suspension)	Report	4× (yellow card) 4× (suspension)	Copper Box, London; Attendance: 4,262; Referees: Nachevski, Nikolov (MKD)

2 August 2012; 14:30	Croatia	26 – 19	Hungary	Copper Box, London; Attendance: 4,950; Referees: Abrahamsen, Kristiansen (NOR)
2 August 2012; 14:30	Čupić 7	(11–9)	Császár, Nagy 4	Copper Box, London; Attendance: 4,950; Referees: Abrahamsen, Kristiansen (NOR)
2 August 2012; 14:30	3× (yellow card) 6× (suspension)	Report	3× (yellow card) 2× (suspension)	Copper Box, London; Attendance: 4,950; Referees: Abrahamsen, Kristiansen (NOR)

4 August 2012; 21:15	Hungary	22 – 33	Spain	Copper Box, London; Attendance: 4,280; Referees: Horáček, Novotný (CZE)
4 August 2012; 21:15	Nagy 7	(13–16)	Aguinagalde 9	Copper Box, London; Attendance: 4,280; Referees: Horáček, Novotný (CZE)
4 August 2012; 21:15	4× (yellow card) 4× (suspension)	Report	3× (yellow card) 4× (suspension)	Copper Box, London; Attendance: 4,280; Referees: Horáček, Novotný (CZE)

6 August 2012; 09:30	Hungary	26 – 23	Serbia	Copper Box, London; Attendance: 4,159; Referees: Abrahamsen, Kristiansen (NOR)
6 August 2012; 09:30	Mocsai 9	(9–11)	Ilić, Prodanović 5	Copper Box, London; Attendance: 4,159; Referees: Abrahamsen, Kristiansen (NOR)
6 August 2012; 09:30	4× (yellow card) 3× (suspension)	Report	3× (yellow card) 4× (suspension)	Copper Box, London; Attendance: 4,159; Referees: Abrahamsen, Kristiansen (NOR)

Quarterfinals

8 August 2012
11:00
Iceland
33 – 34 (ET)
Hungary
Basketball Arena, London
Attendance: 9,063
Referees: Lazaar, Reveret (FRA)
Sigurðsson 8
(12–16)
Nagy 9
3× (yellow card) 2× (suspension)
Report
3× (yellow card) 4× (suspension)

FT: 27–27 ET: 3–3, 3–4

Semifinals

10 August 2012; 17:00	Hungary	26 – 27	Sweden	Basketball Arena, London; Attendance: 9,597; Referees: Geipel, Helbig (GER)
10 August 2012; 17:00	Császár 8	(12–15)	Ekberg 6	Basketball Arena, London; Attendance: 9,597; Referees: Geipel, Helbig (GER)
10 August 2012; 17:00	4× (yellow card) 3× (suspension)	Report	3× (yellow card) 5× (suspension)	Basketball Arena, London; Attendance: 9,597; Referees: Geipel, Helbig (GER)

Bronze medal game

12 August 2012; 11:00	Hungary	26 – 33	Croatia	Basketball Arena, London; Attendance: 9,263; Referees: Horáček, Novotný (CZE)
12 August 2012; 11:00	Harsányi 7	(14–19)	Čupić 8	Basketball Arena, London; Attendance: 9,263; Referees: Horáček, Novotný (CZE)
12 August 2012; 11:00	4× (yellow card) 4× (suspension)	Report	3× (yellow card) 3× (suspension)	Basketball Arena, London; Attendance: 9,263; Referees: Horáček, Novotný (CZE)

== Judo ==
Men

Athlete	Event	Round of 64	Round of 32	Round of 16	Quarterfinals	Semifinals	Repechage	Final / BM	
Athlete	Event	Opposition Result	Opposition Result	Opposition Result	Opposition Result	Opposition Result	Opposition Result	Opposition Result	Rank
Miklós Ungvári	−66 kg	Faizzada (AFG); W 1000–0000	Sanchez (BIZ); W 1000–0000	Drakšič (SLO); W 0011–0002	Zagrodnik (POL); W 0010–0002	Uriarte (ESP); W 0011–0000	Bye	Shavdatuashvili (GEO); L 0001–0010	2nd place, silver medalist(s)
László Csoknyai	−81 kg	Bye	Wiradamungga (INA); W 0200–0001	Kim J-B (KOR); L 0002–0010	Did not advance				
Tamás Madarász	−90 kg	—N/a	Bye	Choriev (UZB); L 0001–1001	Did not advance				
Barna Bor	+100 kg	—N/a	Verbij (NED); W 0002–0001	Malki (MAR); W 0100–0000	Tölzer (GER); L 0002–0011	Did not advance	Silva (BRA); L 0001–0001 YUS	Did not advance	7

Women

Athlete	Event	Round of 32	Round of 16	Quarterfinals	Semifinals	Repechage	Final / BM	
Athlete	Event	Opposition Result	Opposition Result	Opposition Result	Opposition Result	Opposition Result	Opposition Result	Rank
Éva Csernoviczki	−48 kg	Bye	Ente (NED); W 0010–0001	van Snick (BEL); L 0000–1001	Did not advance	Wu Sg (CHN); W 0210–0002	Fukumi (JPN); W 1001–0001	3rd place, bronze medalist(s)
Hedvig Karakas	−57 kg	Bellorin (ESP); W 1000–0011	Silva (BRA); W 000H–1001	Căprioriu (ROU); L 0000–0000 YUS	Did not advance	Zabludina (RUS); W 0011–0000	Pavia (FRA); L 0002–0011	5
Anett Mészáros	−70 kg	Bye	Thiele (GER); L 0001–0001 YUS	Did not advance				
Abigél Joó	−78 kg	Bye	Koumba (GAB); W 0100–0000	Harrison (USA); L 0010–0101	Did not advance	Pogorzelec (POL); W 1012–0022	Tcheuméo (FRA); L 0001–1000	5

== Modern pentathlon ==
Hungary has qualified two men and two women.

Athlete	Event	Fencing (épée one touch)			Swimming (200 m freestyle)			Riding (show jumping)			Combined: shooting/running (10 m air pistol)/(3000 m)			Total points	Final rank
Athlete	Event	Results	Rank	MP points	Time	Rank	MP points	Penalties	Rank	MP points	Time	Rank	MP Points	Total points	Final rank
Róbert Kasza	Men's	20–15	=6	880	2:01.59	7	1344	0	1	1200	11:27.85	32	2252	5676	12
Ádám Marosi	Men's	20–15	=6	880	2:02.08	8	1336	0	2	1200	10:45.72	12	2420	5836	3rd place, bronze medalist(s)
Sarolta Kovács	Women's	11–24	=32	664	2:08.11	1	1264	680*	34	520	12:43.69	26	1948	4396	33
Adrienn Tóth	Women's	24–11	2	976	2:17.32	12	1156	100	24	1100	13:07.33	31	1852	5084	24

* Did not finish

== Rowing ==
Hungary has qualified the following boats.

Men

Athlete	Event	Heats		Repechage		Semifinals		Final	
Athlete	Event	Time	Rank	Time	Rank	Time	Rank	Time	Rank
Béla Simon; Domonkos Széll	Pair	6:46.18	5 R	6:27.88	4	Did not advance			
Zsolt Hirling; Tamás Varga	Lightweight double sculls	6:39.80	4 R	6:32.31	2 SA/B	6:42.81	5 FB	6:39.98	11

Qualification Legend: FA=Final A (medal); FB=Final B (non-medal); FC=Final C (non-medal); FD=Final D (non-medal); FE=Final E (non-medal); FF=Final F (non-medal); SA/B=Semifinals A/B; SC/D=Semifinals C/D; SE/F=Semifinals E/F; QF=Quarterfinals; R=Repechage

== Sailing ==
Hungary has qualified 1 boat for each of the following events

Men

Athlete	Event	Race											Net points	Final rank
Athlete	Event	1	2	3	4	5	6	7	8	9	10	M*	Net points	Final rank
Áron Gádorfalvi	RS:X	34	33	~~DNF~~	22	7	21	18	24	3	25	EL	187	25
Zsombor Berecz	Laser	30	~~34~~	11	12	34	3	22	14	4	31	EL	159	21

Women

Athlete	Event	Race											Net points	Final rank
Athlete	Event	1	2	3	4	5	6	7	8	9	10	M*	Net points	Final rank
Diána Detre	RS:X	17	16	13	19	16	14	17	18	~~21~~	20	EL	150	18

Legend: M=Medal race; DNF=Did not finish; EL= Eliminated – did not advance into the medal race;

== Shooting ==
Men

Athlete	Event	Qualification		Final	
Athlete	Event	Points	Rank	Points	Rank
Richárd Bognár	Double trap	137	6 Q	182	6
Péter Sidi	50 m rifle prone	595	11	Did not advance	
Péter Sidi	50 m rifle 3 positions	1168	8 Q	1269.0	6
Péter Sidi	10 m air rifle	594	13	Did not advance	

Women

Athlete	Event	Qualification		Final	
Athlete	Event	Points	Rank	Points	Rank
Zsófia Csonka	25 m pistol	584	6 Q	784.0	6
Zsófia Csonka	10 m air pistol	381	16	Did not advance	

== Swimming ==
Swimmers have so far achieved qualifying standards in the following events (up to a maximum of 2 swimmers in each event at the Olympic Qualifying Time (OQT), and potentially 1 at the Olympic Selection Time (OST)):

Men

Athlete	Event	Heat		Semifinal		Final	
Athlete	Event	Time	Rank	Time	Rank	Time	Rank
Gábor Balog	200 m backstroke	1:56.98	5 Q	1:57.56	11	Did not advance	
Péter Bernek	200 m backstroke	1:57.52	9 Q	1:57.71	12	Did not advance	
Bence Biczó	200 m butterfly	1:56.51	13 Q	1:55.36	9	Did not advance	
Richárd Bohus	100 m backstroke	54.84	22	Did not advance			
László Cseh	200 m butterfly	1:55.86	9 Q	1:55.88	12	Did not advance	
László Cseh	200 m individual medley	1:57.20	1 Q	1:56.74	2 Q	1:56.22	3rd place, bronze medalist(s)
László Cseh	400 m individual medley	4:13.40	9	—N/a		Did not advance	
Csaba Gercsák	10 km open water	—N/a				1:51:30.9	18
Dániel Gyurta	100 m breaststroke	59.76	4 Q	59.74	5 Q	59.53	4
Dániel Gyurta	200 m breaststroke	2:08.71	1 Q	2:08.32	2 Q	2:07.28 WR	1st place, gold medalist(s)
Gergely Gyurta	1500 m freestyle	15:04.22	12	—N/a		Did not advance	
Gergő Kis	400 m freestyle	3:46.77	5 Q	—N/a		3:47.03	6
Gergő Kis	1500 m freestyle	15:21.74	19	—N/a		Did not advance	
Dominik Kozma	100 m freestyle	DNS		Did not advance			
Dominik Kozma	200 m freestyle	1.47:18	9 Q	1:46.93	10	Did not advance	
Ákos Molnár	200 m breaststroke	2:12.42	20	Did not advance			
Bence Pulai	100 m butterfly	52.19	12 Q	52.40	13	Did not advance	
Krisztián Takács	50 m freestyle	22.19	14 Q	22.01	12	Did not advance	
Dávid Verrasztó	200 m individual medley	2:04.53	35	Did not advance			
Dávid Verrasztó	400 m individual medley	4:18.31	22	—N/a		Did not advance	
Gábor Balog; Péter Bernek; Gergő Kis; Krisztián Takács	4 × 100 m freestyle relay	3:21.91	14	—N/a		Did not advance	
Péter Bernek; László Cseh; Gergő Kis; Dominik Kozma	4 × 200 m freestyle relay	7:11.64	8 Q	—N/a		7.13:66	8
László Cseh; Dániel Gyurta; Dominik Kozma; Bence Pulai	4 × 100 m medley relay	3:34.44	7 Q	—N/a		3:33.02	5

Women

Athlete	Event	Heat		Semifinal		Final	
Athlete	Event	Time	Rank	Time	Rank	Time	Rank
Eszter Dara	50 m freestyle	DNS		Did not advance			
Eszter Dara	100 m freestyle	55.37	23	Did not advance			
Katinka Hosszú	200 m butterfly	2:07.75	4 Q	2:07.69	9	Did not advance	
Katinka Hosszú	200 m individual medley	2:10.68	4 Q	2:10.74	5 Q	2:14.19	8
Katinka Hosszú	400 m individual medley	4:33.77	3 Q	—N/a		4:33.49	4
Zsuzsanna Jakabos	200 m butterfly	2:07.79	5 Q	2:06.82	5 Q	2:07.33	7
Zsuzsanna Jakabos	400 m individual medley	4:37.37	9	—N/a		Did not advance	
Boglárka Kapás	400 m freestyle	4:10.01	17	—N/a		Did not advance	
Boglárka Kapás	800 m freestyle	8:26.43	6 Q	—N/a		8:23.89	6
Ágnes Mutina	200 m freestyle	1:59.56	22	Did not advance			
Eszter Povázsay	100 m backstroke	1:03.55	37	Did not advance			
Éva Risztov	400 m freestyle	4:09.08	16	—N/a		Did not advance	
Éva Risztov	800 m freestyle	8:29.06	13	—N/a		Did not advance	
Éva Risztov	10 km open water	—N/a				1:57:38.2	1st place, gold medalist(s)
Dorina Szekeres	200 m backstroke	2:18.16	35	Did not advance			
Liliána Szilágyi	100 m butterfly	1:00.34	34	Did not advance			
Anna Sztankovics	100 m breaststroke	1:09.65	31	Did not advance			
Anna Sztankovics	200 m breaststroke	2:29.67	29	Did not advance			
Evelyn Verrasztó	200 m individual medley	2:12.17	8 Q	2:11.53	9	Did not advance	
Eszter Dara; Ágnes Mutina; Éva Risztov; Evelyn Verrasztó	4 × 100 m freestyle relay	3:44.79	15	—N/a		Did not advance	
Katinka Hosszú; Zsuzsanna Jakabos; Ágnes Mutina; Evelyn Verrasztó	4 × 200 m freestyle relay	7:54.58	9	—N/a		Did not advance	
Eszter Dara; Zsuzsanna Jakabos; Anna Sztankovics; Evelyn Verrasztó	4 × 100 m medley relay	DSQ		—N/a		Did not advance	

Gábor Financsek was designated to compete in 4 × 100 m medley relay, Orsolya Tompa and Brigitta Gregus were designated to compete in 4 × 100 m medley relay, Sára Joó and Vivien Kádas were designated to compete in 4 × 200 m freestyle relay, but they did not participate. They are official members of the Hungarian Olympic Team, but they did not compete in any event.

== Synchronized swimming ==
Hungary has qualified 2 quota places in synchronized swimming.

Athlete	Event	Technical routine		Free routine (preliminary)			Free routine (final)		
Athlete	Event	Points	Rank	Points	Total (technical + free)	Rank	Points	Total (technical + free)	Rank
Eszter Czékus; Szofi Kiss	Duet	79.400	21	79.080	158.480	21	Did not advance		

== Table tennis ==
Two Hungarian table tennis players have qualified for the Games. Based on their world ranking on 16 May 2011 Krisztina Tóth and Georgina Póta qualified for the women's singles.

Athlete	Event	Preliminary round	Round 1	Round 2	Round 3	Round 4	Quarterfinals	Semifinals	Final / BM	
Athlete	Event	Opposition Result	Opposition Result	Opposition Result	Opposition Result	Opposition Result	Opposition Result	Opposition Result	Opposition Result	Rank
Ádám Pattantyús	Men's singles	Bye	Henzell (AUS); L 1–4	Did not advance						
Dániel Zwickl	Men's singles	Bye	Bentsen (DEN); W 4–1	Karakašević (SRB); W 4–1	Chuang C-Y (TPE); L 0–4	Did not advance				
Georgina Póta	Women's singles	Bye		Tian Y (CRO); W 4–1	Park M-Y (KOR); L 1–4	Did not advance				
Krisztina Tóth	Women's singles	Bye	Ramos (VEN); W 4–3	Chen S-Y (TPE); L 3–4	Did not advance					

== Tennis ==
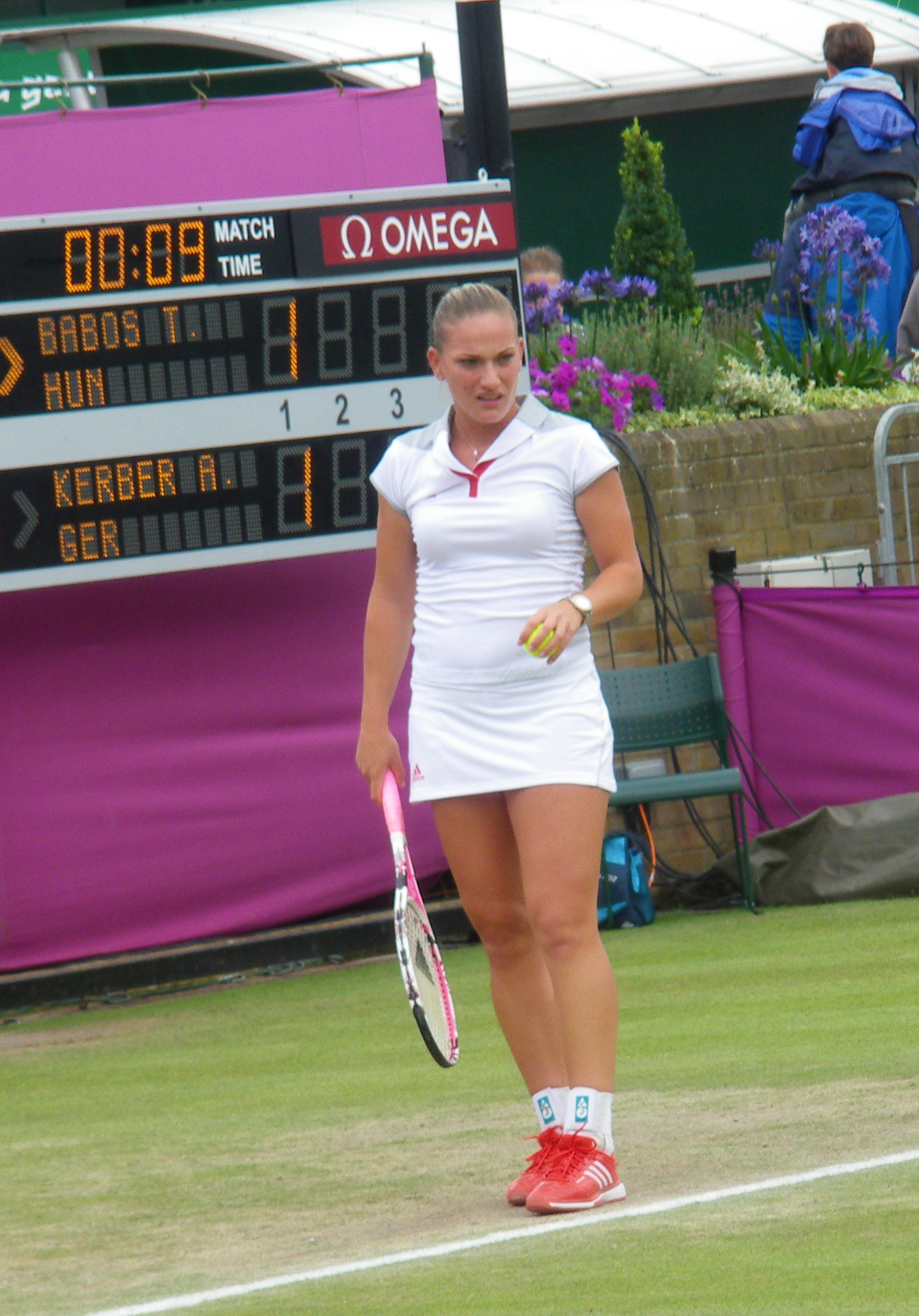
Tímea Babos in women's tennis singles.

Athlete	Event	Round of 64	Round of 32	Round of 16	Quarterfinals	Semifinals	Final / BM	
Athlete	Event	Opposition Score	Opposition Score	Opposition Score	Opposition Score	Opposition Score	Opposition Score	Rank
Tímea Babos	Women's singles	Voskoboeva (KAZ); W 6–4, 6–2	Kerber (GER); L 1–6, 1–6	Did not advance				
Ágnes Szávay	Women's singles	Baltacha (GBR); L 3–6, 3–6	Did not advance					
Tímea Babos; Ágnes Szávay	Women's doubles	—N/a	Hlaváčková / Hradecká (CZE); L 1–6, 7–6, 2–6	Did not advance				

== Triathlon ==
Hungary has qualified the following athletes.

Athlete	Event	Swim (1.5 km)	Trans 1	Bike (40 km)	Trans 2	Run (10 km)	Total Time	Rank
Zsófia Kovács	Women's	19:51	0:44	1:10:40	0:34	38:50	2:10:39	51

== Water polo ==
Hungary has qualified a men's and a women's team. The team will have 13 athletes.

=== Men's tournament ===
Team roster

The following is the Hungarian roster in the men's water polo tournament of the 2012 Summer Olympics.

№	Name	Pos.	Height	Weight	Date of birth	2012 club
1	Zoltán Szécsi	GK	1.98 m (6 ft 6 in)	96 kg (212 lb)	22 December 1977	(Hungary) ZF-Eger
2	Tamás Varga	CB	2.01 m (6 ft 7 in)	105 kg (231 lb)	14 July 1975	(Hungary) Debreceni VSE
3	Norbert Madaras	D	1.91 m (6 ft 3 in)	91 kg (201 lb)	1 December 1979	(Italy) Pro Recco
4	Dénes Varga	D	1.93 m (6 ft 4 in)	95 kg (209 lb)	29 March 1987	(Croatia) Primorje EB
5	Tamás Kásás	D	2.00 m (6 ft 7 in)	97 kg (214 lb)	20 July 1976	(Italy) Pro Recco
6	Norbert Hosnyánszky	D	1.96 m (6 ft 5 in)	102 kg (225 lb)	4 March 1984	(Hungary) ZF-Eger
7	Gergely Kiss	D	1.98 m (6 ft 6 in)	112 kg (247 lb)	27 September 1977	(Hungary) TEVA-Vasas-UNIQA
8	Márton Szivós	CB	1.93 m (6 ft 4 in)	91 kg (201 lb)	19 August 1981	(Hungary) Grupama Honvéd
9	Dániel Varga	CB	2.01 m (6 ft 7 in)	95 kg (209 lb)	25 September 1983	(Croatia) Primorje EB
10	Péter Biros	D	1.96 m (6 ft 5 in)	102 kg (225 lb)	5 April 1976	(Hungary) ZF-Eger
11	Ádám Steinmetz	CF	1.98 m (6 ft 6 in)	104 kg (229 lb)	11 August 1980	(Hungary) TEVA-Vasas-UNIQA
12	Balázs Hárai	CF	2.02 m (6 ft 8 in)	110 kg (243 lb)	5 April 1987	(Hungary) Grupama Honvéd
13	Viktor Nagy	GK	1.98 m (6 ft 6 in)	94 kg (207 lb)	24 July 1984	(Hungary) TEVA-Vasas-UNIQA

Head coach: Dénes Kemény

Group play

Team	Pld	W	D	L	GF	GA	GD	Pts	Qualification
Serbia	5	4	1	0	69	38	+31	9	Quarterfinals
Montenegro	5	3	1	1	54	41	+13	7	Quarterfinals
Hungary	5	3	0	2	65	52	+13	6	Quarterfinals
United States	5	3	0	2	43	44	−1	6	Quarterfinals
Romania	5	1	0	4	48	55	−7	2	
Great Britain	5	0	0	5	28	77	−49	0	

29 July 2012; 15:30	Report	Hungary	10–14	Serbia	Water Polo Arena, London; Referees: Sergi Sanchez (ESP), Massimiliano Caputi (ITA)
29 July 2012; 15:30	Report	Score by quarters: 2–2, 1–3, 3–5, 4–4			Water Polo Arena, London; Referees: Sergi Sanchez (ESP), Massimiliano Caputi (ITA)
29 July 2012; 15:30	Report	three players 2	Goals	Prlainović 5	Water Polo Arena, London; Referees: Sergi Sanchez (ESP), Massimiliano Caputi (ITA)

31 July 2012; 10:00	Report	Hungary	10–11	Montenegro	Water Polo Arena, London; Referees: Sergi Sanchez (ESP), Daniel Flahive (AUS)
31 July 2012; 10:00	Report	Score by quarters: 2–2, 3–4, 3–3, 2–2			Water Polo Arena, London; Referees: Sergi Sanchez (ESP), Daniel Flahive (AUS)
31 July 2012; 10:00	Report	Biros 3	Goals	Brguljan 3	Water Polo Arena, London; Referees: Sergi Sanchez (ESP), Daniel Flahive (AUS)

2 August 2012; 15:30	Report	Romania	15–17	Hungary	Water Polo Arena, London; Referees: Massimiliano Balfanbayev (KAZ), Sergi Sanchez (ESP)
2 August 2012; 15:30	Report	Score by quarters: 4–5, 5–4, 2-5, 4-3			Water Polo Arena, London; Referees: Massimiliano Balfanbayev (KAZ), Sergi Sanchez (ESP)
2 August 2012; 15:30	Report	Bușilă, Ghiban 3	Goals	Madaras 5	Water Polo Arena, London; Referees: Massimiliano Balfanbayev (KAZ), Sergi Sanchez (ESP)

4 August 2012; 18:20	Report	Hungary	17–6	Great Britain	Water Polo Arena, London; Referees: German Moller (ARG), Denis Danelon (BRA)
4 August 2012; 18:20	Report	Score by quarters: 6–1, 5–4, 4–0, 2–1			Water Polo Arena, London; Referees: German Moller (ARG), Denis Danelon (BRA)
4 August 2012; 18:20	Report	Kásás, Madaras 3	Goals	six players 1	Water Polo Arena, London; Referees: German Moller (ARG), Denis Danelon (BRA)

6 August 2012; 15:30	Report	Hungary	11–6	United States	Water Polo Arena, London; Referees: Daniel Flahive (AUS), Georgios Stavridis (GRE)
6 August 2012; 15:30	Report	Score by quarters: 1–0, 5–2, 4–1, 1–3			Water Polo Arena, London; Referees: Daniel Flahive (AUS), Georgios Stavridis (GRE)
6 August 2012; 15:30	Report	Hosnyánszky 3	Goals	six players 1	Water Polo Arena, London; Referees: Daniel Flahive (AUS), Georgios Stavridis (GRE)

Quarterfinals

8 August 2012; 18:40	Report	Italy	11–9	Hungary	Water Polo Arena, London; Referees: Georgios Stavridis (GRE), Alan Balfanbayev (KAZ)
8 August 2012; 18:40	Report	Score by quarters: 2–2, 3–2, 3–1, 3–4			Water Polo Arena, London; Referees: Georgios Stavridis (GRE), Alan Balfanbayev (KAZ)
8 August 2012; 18:40	Report	three players 3	Goals	Madaras 3	Water Polo Arena, London; Referees: Georgios Stavridis (GRE), Alan Balfanbayev (KAZ)

Semifinals 5–8

10 August 2012; 18:30	Report	Hungary	10–9	Australia	Water Polo Arena, London; Referees: Mihajlo Ćirić (SRB), German Moller (ARG)
10 August 2012; 18:30	Report	Score by quarters: 4–2, 2–4, 1–0, 3–3			Water Polo Arena, London; Referees: Mihajlo Ćirić (SRB), German Moller (ARG)
10 August 2012; 18:30	Report	Madaras, Biros 3	Goals	three players 2	Water Polo Arena, London; Referees: Mihajlo Ćirić (SRB), German Moller (ARG)

Fifth place game

12 August 2012; 11:40	Report	Spain	8–14	Hungary	Water Polo Arena, London; Referees: Marijo Brguljan (MNE), Alan Balfanbayev (KAZ)
12 August 2012; 11:40	Report	Score by quarters: 1–4, 2–3, 1–5, 4–2			Water Polo Arena, London; Referees: Marijo Brguljan (MNE), Alan Balfanbayev (KAZ)
12 August 2012; 11:40	Report	Minguell 3	Goals	six players 2	Water Polo Arena, London; Referees: Marijo Brguljan (MNE), Alan Balfanbayev (KAZ)

=== Women's tournament ===
Team roster

The following is the Hungarian roster in the women's water polo tournament of the 2012 Summer Olympics.

№	Name	Pos.	Height	Weight	Date of birth	2012 club
1	Flóra Bolonyai	GK	1.79 m (5 ft 10 in)	69 kg (152 lb)	5 April 1991	(United States) USC Trojans
2	Dóra Czigány	CF	1.70 m (5 ft 7 in)	62 kg (137 lb)	23 October 1992	(Hungary) ZF-Eger
3	Dóra Antal	CF	1.68 m (5 ft 6 in)	60 kg (132 lb)	9 September 1993	(Hungary) ZF-Eger
4	Hanna Kisteleki	CF	1.73 m (5 ft 8 in)	67 kg (148 lb)	10 March 1991	(Hungary) BVSC ‐ Zugló
5	Gabriella Szűcs	CF	1.83 m (6 ft 0 in)	74 kg (163 lb)	7 March 1988	(Hungary) Dunaújvárosi Főiskola VE
6	Orsolya Takács	CB	1.90 m (6 ft 3 in)	83 kg (183 lb)	20 May 1985	(Hungary) Szentesi Vizilabda Klub
7	Rita Drávucz	D	1.80 m (5 ft 11 in)	68 kg (150 lb)	14 April 1980	(Italy) Pro Recco
8	Rita Keszthelyi	D	1.77 m (5 ft 10 in)	67 kg (148 lb)	10 December 1991	(Hungary) Szentesi Vizilabda Klub
9	Ildikó Tóth	CB	1.75 m (5 ft 9 in)	70 kg (154 lb)	23 April 1987	(Hungary) BVSC ‐ Zugló
10	Barbara Bujka	CB	1.74 m (5 ft 9 in)	84 kg (185 lb)	5 September 1986	(Italy) Waterpolo Fontalba Messina
11	Dóra Csabai	CB	1.75 m (5 ft 9 in)	62 kg (137 lb)	20 April 1989	(Hungary) BVSC ‐ Zugló
12	Katalin Menczinger	CB	1.78 m (5 ft 10 in)	69 kg (152 lb)	17 January 1989	(Hungary) Dunaújvárosi Főiskola VE
13	Edina Gangl	GK	1.81 m (5 ft 11 in)	67 kg (148 lb)	25 June 1990	(Hungary) ZF-Eger

Head coach: András Merész

Group play

Team	Pld	W	D	L	GF	GA	GD	Pts
Spain	3	2	1	0	33	26	+7	5
United States	3	2	1	0	30	28	+2	5
Hungary	3	1	0	2	35	37	−2	2
China	3	0	0	3	22	29	−7	0

30 July 2012; 19:40	Report	Hungary	13–14	United States	Water Polo Arena, London; Referees: Brian Littlejohn (GBR), Denis Danelon (BRA)
30 July 2012; 19:40	Report	Score by quarters: 3–4, 4–4, 2–3, 4–3			Water Polo Arena, London; Referees: Brian Littlejohn (GBR), Denis Danelon (BRA)
30 July 2012; 19:40	Report	Bujka 4	Goals	Steffens 7	Water Polo Arena, London; Referees: Brian Littlejohn (GBR), Denis Danelon (BRA)

1 August 2012; 14:10	Report	Hungary	11–10	China	Water Polo Arena, London; Referees: Georgios Stavridis (GRE), Svetlana Dreval (RUS)
1 August 2012; 14:10	Report	Score by quarters: 1–3, 4–4, 4–3, 2–0			Water Polo Arena, London; Referees: Georgios Stavridis (GRE), Svetlana Dreval (RUS)
1 August 2012; 14:10	Report	Szűcs 4	Goals	four players 2	Water Polo Arena, London; Referees: Georgios Stavridis (GRE), Svetlana Dreval (RUS)

3 August 2012; 14:10	Report	Spain	13–11	Hungary	Water Polo Arena, London; Referees: Massimiliano Caputi (ITA), Svetlana Dreval (RUS)
3 August 2012; 14:10	Report	Score by quarters: 4–3, 3–2, 3–2, 3–4			Water Polo Arena, London; Referees: Massimiliano Caputi (ITA), Svetlana Dreval (RUS)
3 August 2012; 14:10	Report	Espar 3	Goals	Antal 4	Water Polo Arena, London; Referees: Massimiliano Caputi (ITA), Svetlana Dreval (RUS)

Quarterfinals

5 August 2012; 14:50	Report	Hungary	11–10	Russia	Water Polo Arena, London; Referees: Massimiliano Caputi (ITA), Marijo Mrguljan (MNE)
5 August 2012; 14:50	Report	Score by quarters: 3–3, 4–2, 1–3, 3–2			Water Polo Arena, London; Referees: Massimiliano Caputi (ITA), Marijo Mrguljan (MNE)
5 August 2012; 14:50	Report	four players 2	Goals	Ivanova 4	Water Polo Arena, London; Referees: Massimiliano Caputi (ITA), Marijo Mrguljan (MNE)

Semifinals

7 August 2012; 19:40	Report	Hungary	9–10	Spain	Water Polo Arena, London; Referees: Dragan Stampalija (CRO), Massimiliano Caputi (ITA)
7 August 2012; 19:40	Report	Score by quarters: 1–2, 4–5, 2–2, 2–1			Water Polo Arena, London; Referees: Dragan Stampalija (CRO), Massimiliano Caputi (ITA)
7 August 2012; 19:40	Report	three players 2	Goals	Espar 4	Water Polo Arena, London; Referees: Dragan Stampalija (CRO), Massimiliano Caputi (ITA)

Bronze medal game

9 August 2012; 18:40	Report	(bronze) Australia	13–11 (OT)	Hungary	Water Polo Arena, London; Referees: Adrian Alexandrescu (ROU), Dragan Stampalija (CRO)
9 August 2012; 18:40	Report	Score by quarters: 2–1, 5–3, 3–4, 1–3 OT: 1–0, 1–0			Water Polo Arena, London; Referees: Adrian Alexandrescu (ROU), Dragan Stampalija (CRO)
9 August 2012; 18:40	Report	Beadsworth 4	Goals	Keszthelyi 3	Water Polo Arena, London; Referees: Adrian Alexandrescu (ROU), Dragan Stampalija (CRO)

== Weightlifting ==
Hungary has qualified the following quota places.

Athlete	Event	Snatch		Clean & Jerk		Total	Rank
Athlete	Event	Result	Rank	Result	Rank	Total	Rank
Péter Nagy	Men's +105 kg	191	9	225	11	416	11

== Wrestling ==
Hungary has qualified the following quota place.

Key:
- VT – Victory by Fall.
- PP – Decision by Points – the loser with technical points.
- PO – Decision by Points – the loser without technical points.

Men's freestyle

Athlete	Event	Qualification	Round of 16	Quarterfinal	Semifinal	Repechage 1	Repechage 2	Final / BM	
Athlete	Event	Opposition Result	Opposition Result	Opposition Result	Opposition Result	Opposition Result	Opposition Result	Opposition Result	Rank
Gábor Hatos	−74 kg	Bye	Zhang C (CHN); W 3–0 ^{PO}	Shapiyev (KAZ); W 3–0 ^{PO}	Goudarzi (IRI); L 0–3 ^{PO}	Bye		Tigiev (UZB); L 0–3 ^{PO}	(bronze)
Dániel Ligeti	−120 kg	Bye	Shemarov (BLR); L 1–3^{PP}	Did not advance					12

Men's Greco-Roman

Athlete	Event	Qualification	Round of 16	Quarterfinal	Semifinal	Repechage 1	Repechage 2	Final / BM	
Athlete	Event	Opposition Result	Opposition Result	Opposition Result	Opposition Result	Opposition Result	Opposition Result	Opposition Result	Rank
Péter Módos	−55 kg	Bye	Tasmuradov (UZB); W 3–0 ^{PO}	Sourian (IRI); L 0–3 ^{PO}	Did not advance	Bye	Eraliev (KGZ); W 3–0 ^{PO}	Nyblom (DEN); W 3–1 ^{PP}	3rd place, bronze medalist(s)
Tamás Lőrincz	−66 kg	Bye	Stäbler (GER); W 3–1 ^{PP}	Lester (USA); W 3–1 ^{PP}	Tskhadaia (GEO); W 3–0 ^{PO}	Bye		Kim H-W (KOR); L 0–3 ^{PO}	2nd place, silver medalist(s)
Péter Bácsi	−74 kg	Bye	Kazakevič (LTU); L 0–5 ^{VB}	Did not advance					14
Mihály Deák-Bárdos	−120 kg	Liu D (CHN); W 3–1 ^{PP}	Eurén (SWE); L 0–3 ^{PO}	Did not advance					11

Women's freestyle

Athlete	Event	Qualification	Round of 16	Quarterfinal	Semifinal	Repechage 1	Repechage 2	Final / BM	
Athlete	Event	Opposition Result	Opposition Result	Opposition Result	Opposition Result	Opposition Result	Opposition Result	Opposition Result	Rank
Marianna Sastin	−63 kg	Mendonca (GBS); W 3–0 ^{PO}	Ostapchuk (UKR); L 0–3 ^{PO}	Did not advance					11
