= Darryl Fitzgerald =

New Zealand sprint canoeist (born 1990)

Personal information
- Full name: Darryl Stewart Fitzgerald
- Nickname: Fitzy
- Nationality: New Zealand
- Born: 9 August 1990 (age 36) Gisborne, New Zealand
- Height: 1.86 m (6 ft 1 in)
- Weight: 85 kg (187 lb)

Sport
- Sport: Canoeing
- Event: Sprint canoe
- Club: Poverty Bay Kayak Club
- Coached by: Ian Ferguson

Darryl Stewart Fitzgerald (born 9 August 1990 in Gisborne) is a New Zealand sprint canoeist. Fitzgerald is a member of Poverty Bay Kayak Club, and is coached and trained by four-time Olympic kayaking champion Ian Ferguson (1984 and 1988).

Fitzgerald qualified for the men's K-2 1000 metres at the 2012 Summer Olympics in London, by placing first from the 2012 ICF Oceania Qualification Tournament in Penrith, New South Wales, Australia. Fitzgerald, along with his partner and four-time Olympian Steven Ferguson, finished seventh in the final, seven hundredths of a second (0.07) behind the Russian pair Ilya Medvedev and Anton Ryakhov, posting their best Olympic time of 3:12.117.
