= Emil Stær =

Danish canoeist

Emil Stær (27 February 1989, Aarhus) is a Danish sprint canoeist. At the 2012 Summer Olympics, he competed in the Men's K-2 1000 metres finishing ninth place, and Men's K-4 1000 metres, finishing in fifth place.
