= Steven Ferguson =

Sportsman

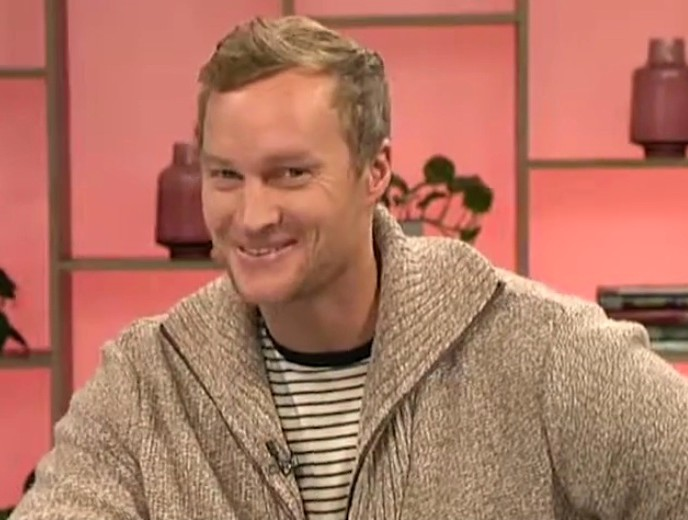
Ferguson in 2016

Steven Sean Ferguson (born 8 May 1980) is a sprint canoeist, surf lifesaver and former swimmer from Auckland, New Zealand.

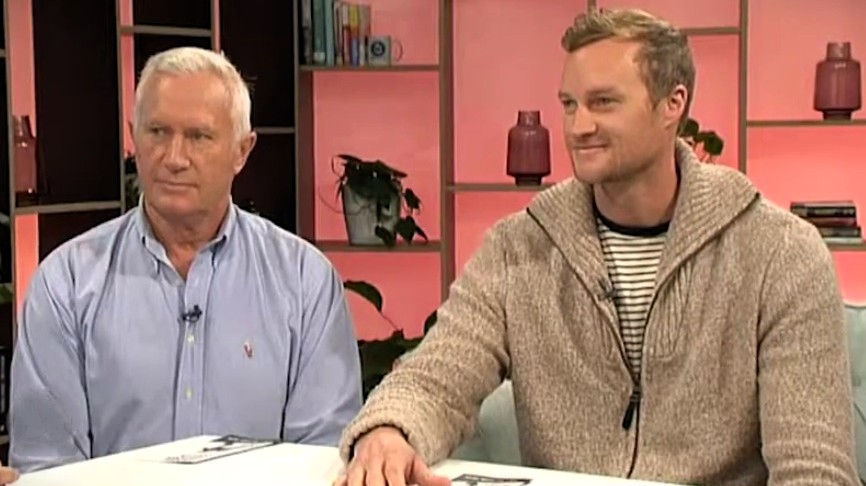
Left to right: Ian Ferguson, Steven Ferguson in 2016

Ferguson is the son of four-time Olympic gold medal-winning canoeist Ian Ferguson.

Steven Ferguson competed in the 100 m and 200 m breaststroke at the 2000 Summer Olympics in Sydney, but did not pass the qualifying heats. He also competed in swimming at the 1998 Commonwealth Games.

He represented New Zealand in canoeing at the 2004 Summer Olympics in Athens. He finished eighth in the K-2 1000 m event, but was eliminated in the heats of the K-1 500 m event. He competed again in the K-2 1000 m at the 2008 Summer Olympics in Beijing with Mike Walker, finishing fifth. He also competed in the K-1 500 m final, finishing eighth. At the 2012 Summer Olympics, he teamed with Darryl Fitzgerald to compete in the K-2 1000 m. They reached the final and finished 7th.

He is also involved in surf lifesaving and belongs to the New Zealand National Team which competed at World Lifesaving Championships 2004 in Viareggio, Italy, and 2006 in Melbourne, Australia. At these events he won medals in the pool swimming and surf ski paddle events.
