= Martin Hollstein =

German sprint canoer (born 1987)

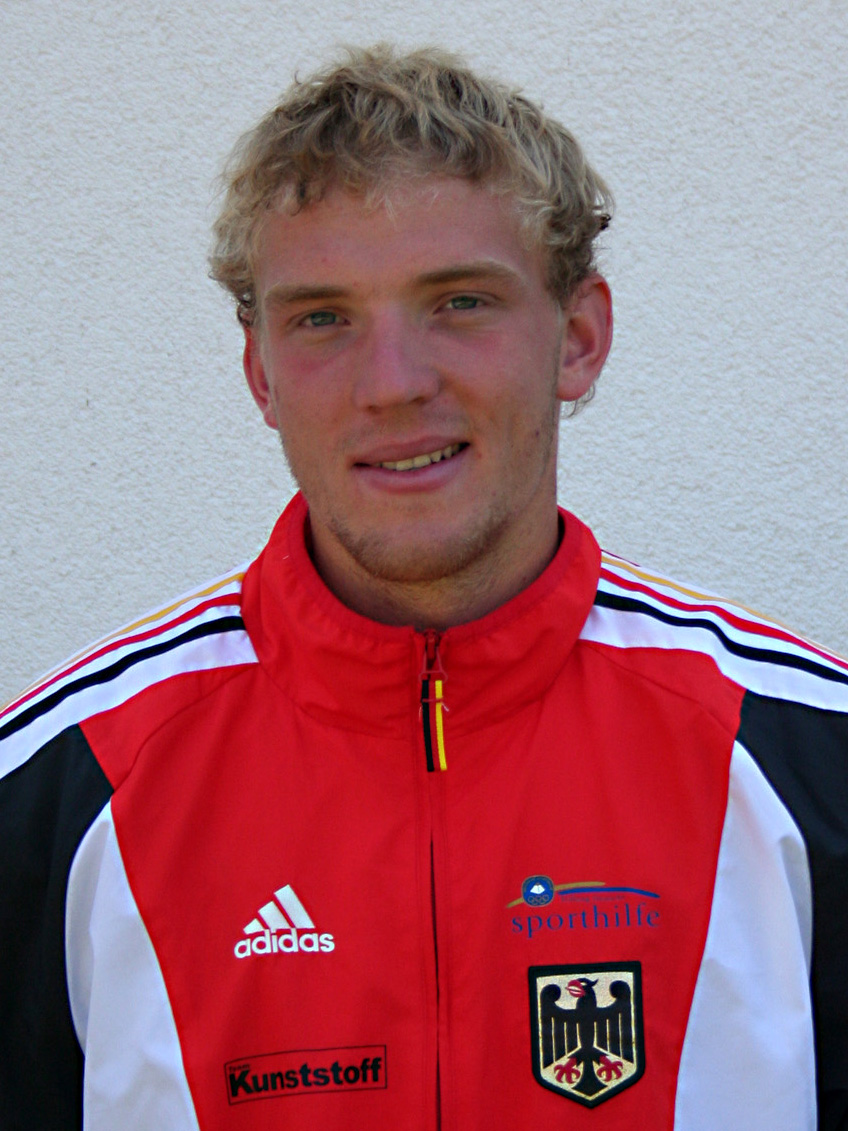

Personal information
- Nationality: German
- Born: 2 April 1987 (age 39) Neubrandenburg, East Germany
- Height: 192 cm (6 ft 4 in)
- Weight: 90 kg (198 lb)

Sport
- Country: Germany
- Sport: Canoe sprint
- Club: SC Neubrandenburg
Medal record
Men's canoe sprint
Representing Germany
Event	1st	2nd	3rd
Olympic Games	1	0	1
World Championships	1	0	0
European Championships	2	1	0
World Cup	1	0	1
Total	5	1	2
Olympic Games
Gold medal – first place	2008 Beijing	K-2 1000 m
Bronze medal – third place	2012 London	K-2 1000 m
World Championships
Gold medal – first place	2010 Poznań	K-2 1000 m
European Championships
Gold medal – first place	2010 Trasona	K-2 1000 m
Gold medal – first place	2011 Belgrade	K-2 1000 m
Silver medal – second place	2012 Zagreb	K-2 1000 m
World Cup
Bronze medal – third place	2013 Račice	K-4 1000 m
Gold medal – first place	2016 Račice	K-2 1000 m

Martin Hollstein (born 2 April 1987 in Neubrandenburg) is a German sprint canoer and Olympic champion. He has been competing since the late 2000s, mostly in kayak single, double or four.

At the 2008 Summer Olympics in Beijing Hollstein won the gold in the K-2 1000 m event with partner Andreas Ihle. At the 2012 Summer Olympics, he and Ihle won the Olympic bronze medal.

Hollstein also won a gold medal in the K-2 1000 m event at the 2010 ICF Canoe Sprint World Championships in Poznań and several European Championships.

== Early life ==
Hollstein, short "Holly", grew up in the German State of Mecklenburg-Vorpommern in the city of Neubrandenburg. There he joined the sports club SC Neubrandenburg in which he remains as a member to this day. His original trainer is Jürgen Lickfett. His first medal won Hollstein at the canoe state championships in Schwerin in the year 1998.

Hollstein startet in September 2005 an education as a mechanic at the Webasto AG company in his hometown Neubrandenburg. There he worked for three years but concentrated mainly on his career as a competitive athlete.

== Professional career ==
=== 2008 Summer Olympics ===
In the national qualification for Olympic Games in 2008 Hollstein he paddled his way to fifth place and was called up to the national team.

At the decisive World Cup in Szeged, he finished fourth in the 500m double with Rupert Wagner, but that fell short of the norm as Olympic champions Ronald Rauhe and Tim Wieskötter won the race.

Shortly before the 2008 Summer Olympics, he surprisingly moved to the side of Andreas Ihle in the kayak double over 1000 meters for the ill Rupert Wagner. In a run-off, they were able to defeat Norman Zahm and Marcus Groß and thus secure participation in the Olympics. On the Olympic canoe course, the duo won the final and with that the Olympic gold medal.

For this success, Hollstein received the Silver Laurel Leaf award in November 2008, the highest state award for top performance in German sport, awarded by the then Federal President Horst Köhler.

==== World and European championships ====
In 2010, Hollstein competed again with his double partner Andreas Ihle and won the gold medal at the 2010 European Canoe Racing Championships in Trasona. In the same year, the team also won the gold medal at the 2010 World Championships in Poznań.

A year later, Hollstein won gold again at the 2011 European Canoe Racing Championships in Belgrade. At the European Championships the following year in Zagreb, the canoeist took 2nd place.

==== 2012 Summer Olympics ====
At the 2012 Summer Olympics in London, he won the bronze medal in kayak double over 1000 m with Andreas Ihle.

Hollstein again received the Silver Laurel Leaf for this Olympic medal success. It was awarded by the Federal President Joachim Gauck at a ceremony in Bellevue Palace.

==== Injury ====
In September 2013, Hollstein had to take an injury-related break due to a broken hand. Despite his lack of training, the canoeist received a promise from the sports association that he would continue to receive maximum support, even if he missed out on the 2014 World Cup team due to injury.

After missing the finals at the European Championship 2014 in Brandenburg, intense training weeks followed for the four-man team around Hollstein with his partners Marius Radow, Martin Schubert and Kai Spenner.

In 2015 Hollstein had to undergo a surgery on his shoulder and had to take an injury-related break again.

==== End of active career ====
The last major competition for Hollstein were the 2016 European Championships in Moscow. There he competed under national coach Reiner Kießler. In the kayak double over 500 meters, the team took 4th place.

== Federal Police and personal life ==
In September 2009 he began training as a police officer at the German Federal Police. During his active career the police officer trainee was a member of the Kienbaum National Training Centre, the Federal Police's top sports promotion facility for summer and year-round sports.

He is currently working for the Federal Police at Berlin-Brandenburg Airport. Hollstein currently resides in Berlin and continues to compete privately in various competitions throughout Germany and internationally.

== Awards ==
- Awarded the Silver Laurel Leaf by Federal President Horst Köhler in 2008
- "Champion of the Year" 2008 Award at the Robinson Club in September 2008 in Agadir, Morocco
- Awarded the Silver Laurel Leaf by Federal President Joachim Gauck in November 2012 in Bellevue Palace
- Bronze star at the Walk of Sport in January 2022 in Neubrandenburg

== Greatest competitions ==
Competition	Place	Discipline	Location
2008 Summer Olympics	1st	kayak double 1000-m	Beijing
2009 European Championships	5th	kayak double 200-m	Brandenburg
2010 European Championships	1st	kayak double 1000-m	Trasona
2010 European Championships	6th	kayak double 500-m	Trasona
2010 World Championships	1st	kayak double 1000-m	Posen
2010 World Championships	4th	kayak double 500-m	Posen
2011 European Championships	1st	kayak double 1000-m	Belgrade
2011 European Championships	7th	kayak double 500-m	Belgrade
2011 World Championships	5th	kayak double 1000-m	Szeged
2012 European Championships	2nd	kayak double 1000-m	Zagreb
2012 Summer Olympics	3rd	kayak double 1000-m	London
2013 European Championships	5th	kayak four 1000-m	Montemor
2013 World Championships	9th	kayak double 1000-m	Duisburg
2016 European Championships	4th	kayak double 500-m	Moscow
