= Portugal at the 2012 Summer Olympics =

- IOC code: POR
- NOC: Olympic Committee of Portugal
- Website: www.comiteolimpicoportugal.pt (in Portuguese)

in London
- Competitors: 77 in 13 sports
- Flag bearers: Telma Monteiro (opening); Fernando Pimenta (closing)
- Medals Ranked 69th: Gold 0 Silver 1 Bronze 0 Total 1

Summer Olympics appearances (overview)
- 1912; 1920; 1924; 1928; 1932; 1936; 1948; 1952; 1956; 1960; 1964; 1968; 1972; 1976; 1980; 1984; 1988; 1992; 1996; 2000; 2004; 2008; 2012; 2016; 2020; 2024; 2028

Portugal competed at the 2012 Summer Olympics, held in London, from 27 July to 12 August 2012. The nation celebrated its centennial anniversary participating in the Olympics, having participated at every Summer edition since 1912. The Olympic Committee of Portugal sent a total of 77 athletes to the Games, 45 men and 32 women, to compete in 13 sports. Despite having the same number of athletes as in Beijing, Portugal did not qualify any athletes in archery, fencing and taekwondo.

Thirty-eight of the Portuguese athletes had competed in Beijing, including sailor Gustavo Lima, who had finished fourth in men's Laser class, and race walker Ana Cabecinha, who had set a national record for her sporting event. Windsurfer and multiple-time European champion João Rodrigues became the first Portuguese athlete to compete in six Olympic Games. Meanwhile, former middle-distance runner Luís Feiteira made his Olympic comeback in London to compete in the men's marathon after a sixteen-year absence. Pistol shooter João Costa, at age 47, was the oldest athlete on the team, while breaststroke swimmer Ana Rodrigues was the youngest at age 18. Judoka Telma Monteiro, who claimed two titles each in World Cup, and in the European championships, became Portugal's first female flag bearer at the opening ceremony since 1996.

Portugal left London with only a silver medal, won by sprint kayak pair Emanuel Silva and Fernando Pimenta. This was considered the nation's worst Olympic Games since 1992, following poor performances by the athletes, and the absence of former Olympic medalists from the team due to injuries. Notable absences included the defending champion Nelson Évora in the men's triple jump, triathlete Vanessa Fernandes, former medalists Francis Obikwelu and Rui Silva, and long jumper Naide Gomes.

== Medalists ==
Medal	Name	Sport	Event	Date
Silver	Fernando Pimenta; Emanuel Silva	Canoeing	Men's K-2 1000 m	8 August

== Athletics ==
The following athletes have achieved qualifying standards in athletics events (up to a maximum of three athletes per event with the 'A' Standard, and one athlete per event with the 'B' Standard):

Key

- Note – Ranks given for track events are within the athlete's heat only
- Q = Qualified for the next round
- q = Qualified for the next round as a fastest loser or, in field events, by position without achieving the qualifying target
- NR = National record
- N/A = Round not applicable for the event
- Bye = Athlete not required to compete in round

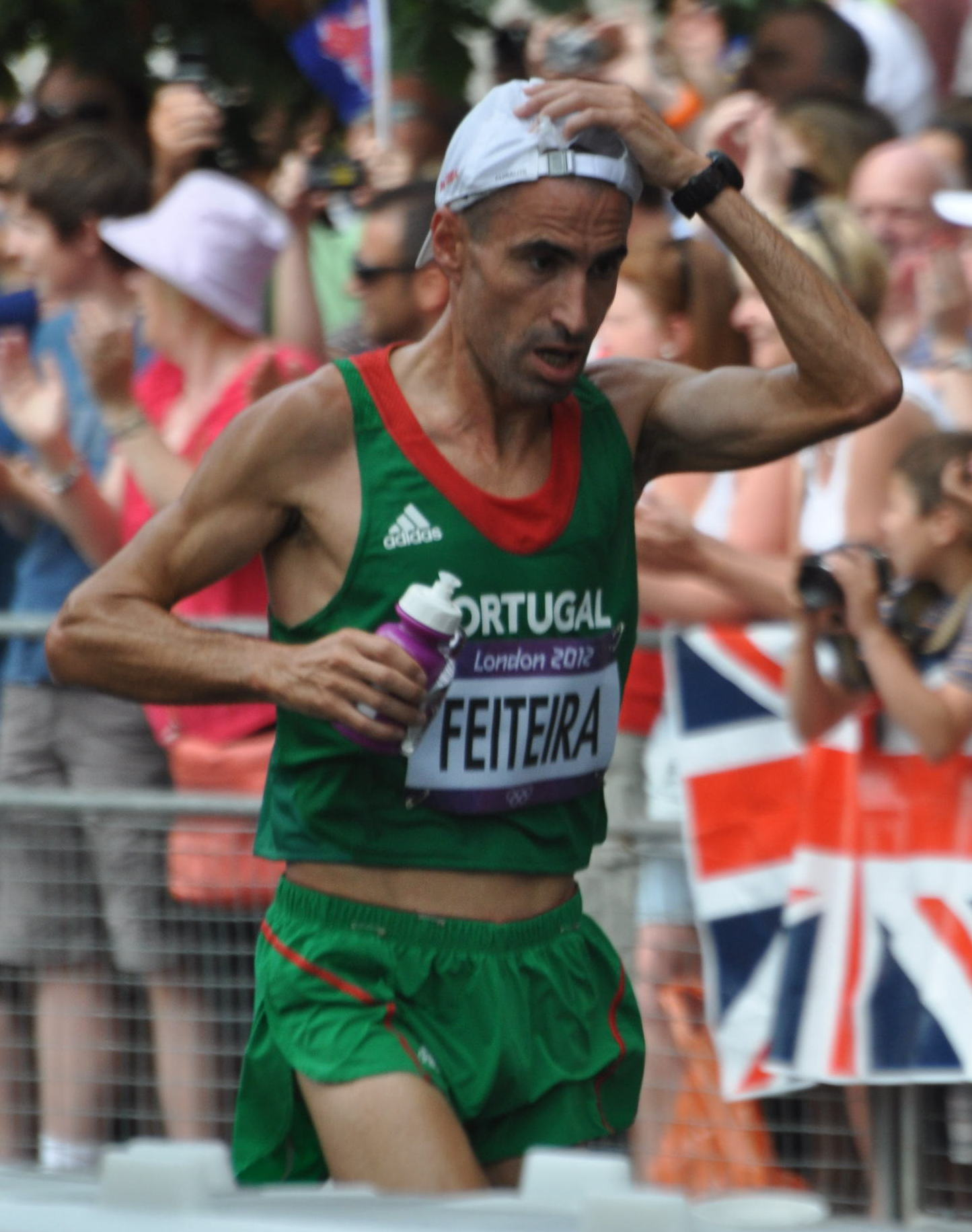
Luis Feiteira finished forty-eighth in men's marathon.

Men
Track & road events

Athlete	Event	Heat		Semifinal		Final	
Athlete	Event	Result	Rank	Result	Rank	Result	Rank
Arnaldo Abrantes	200 m	20.88	5	Did not advance			
João Almeida	110 m hurdles	13.69	6	Did not advance			
Luis Feiteira	Marathon	—N/a				2:19:40	48
Pedro Isidro	50 km walk	—N/a				3:58:59	40
Jorge Paula	400 m hurdles	51.40	8	Did not advance			
Alberto Paulo	3000 m steeplechase	8:40.74	12	—N/a		Did not advance	
Rui Pedro Silva	Marathon	—N/a				DNF	
João Vieira	20 km walk	—N/a				1:20:41	11
João Vieira	50 km walk	—N/a				DNF	

Field events

Athlete	Event	Qualification		Final	
Athlete	Event	Distance	Position	Distance	Position
Marcos Chuva	Long jump	7.55	28	Did not advance	
Marco Fortes	Shot put	20.07	15	Did not advance	
Edi Maia	Pole vault	5.20	24	Did not advance	

Women
Track & road events

Athlete	Event	Heat		Semifinal		Final	
Athlete	Event	Result	Rank	Result	Rank	Result	Rank
Jéssica Augusto	Marathon	—N/a				2:25:11	7
Vera Barbosa	400 m hurdles	55.22 NR	3 Q	56.27	7	Did not advance	
Marisa Barros	Marathon	—N/a				2:26:13	13
Ana Cabecinha	20 km walk	—N/a				1:28:03	9
Clarisse Cruz	3000 m steeplechase	9:30.06	5 q	—N/a		9:32.44	11
Ana Dulce Félix	10000 m	—N/a				DNS	
Ana Dulce Félix	Marathon	—N/a				2:28:12	21
Inês Henriques	20 km walk	—N/a				1:29:54	15
Sara Moreira	5000 m	DNS		—N/a		Did not advance	
Sara Moreira	10000 m	—N/a				31:16.44	14
Vera Santos	20 km walk	—N/a				1:35:51	49

Field events

Athlete	Event	Qualification		Final	
Athlete	Event	Distance	Position	Distance	Position
Patrícia Mamona	Triple jump	14.11	13	Did not advance	
Irina Rodrigues	Discus throw	57.23	32	Did not advance	
Vânia Silva	Hammer throw	62.81	35	Did not advance	
Maria Leonor Tavares	Pole vault	4.10	=31	Did not advance	

== Badminton ==
Athlete	Event	Group stage			Round of 16	Quarterfinal	Semifinal	Final / BM	
Athlete	Event	Opposition Score	Opposition Score	Rank	Opposition Score	Opposition Score	Opposition Score	Opposition Score	Rank
Pedro Martins	Men's singles	Gade (DEN); L 21–14, 21–8	—N/a	2	Did not advance				
Telma Santos	Women's singles	Jayasinghe (SRI); W 21–9, 21–11	Inthanon (THA); L 21–12, 21–6	2	Did not advance				

== Canoeing ==
Men

Athlete	Event	Heats		Semifinals		Final	
Athlete	Event	Time	Rank	Time	Rank	Time	Rank
Fernando Pimenta; Emanuel Silva	K-2 200 m	DNS		Did not advance			
Fernando Pimenta; Emanuel Silva	K-2 1000 m	3:13.710	2 Q	3:14.017	3 FA	3:09.699	2nd place, silver medalist(s)

Women

Athlete	Event	Heats		Semifinals		Final	
Athlete	Event	Time	Rank	Time	Rank	Time	Rank
Teresa Portela	K-1 200 m	42.673	3 Q	41.562	3 FA	46.549	8
Teresa Portela	K-1 500 m	1:51.887	2 Q	1:53.064	3 FB	1:53.597	11
Beatriz Gomes; Joana Vasconcelos	K-2 500 m	1:44.660	2 Q	1:43.305	3 FA	1:44.924	6
Beatriz Gomes; Teresa Portela; Helena Rodrigues; Joana Vasconcelos	K-4 500 m	1:32.785	2 FA	Bye		1:33.453	6

Qualification Legend: FA = Qualify to final (medal); FB = Qualify to final B (non-medal)

== Cycling ==
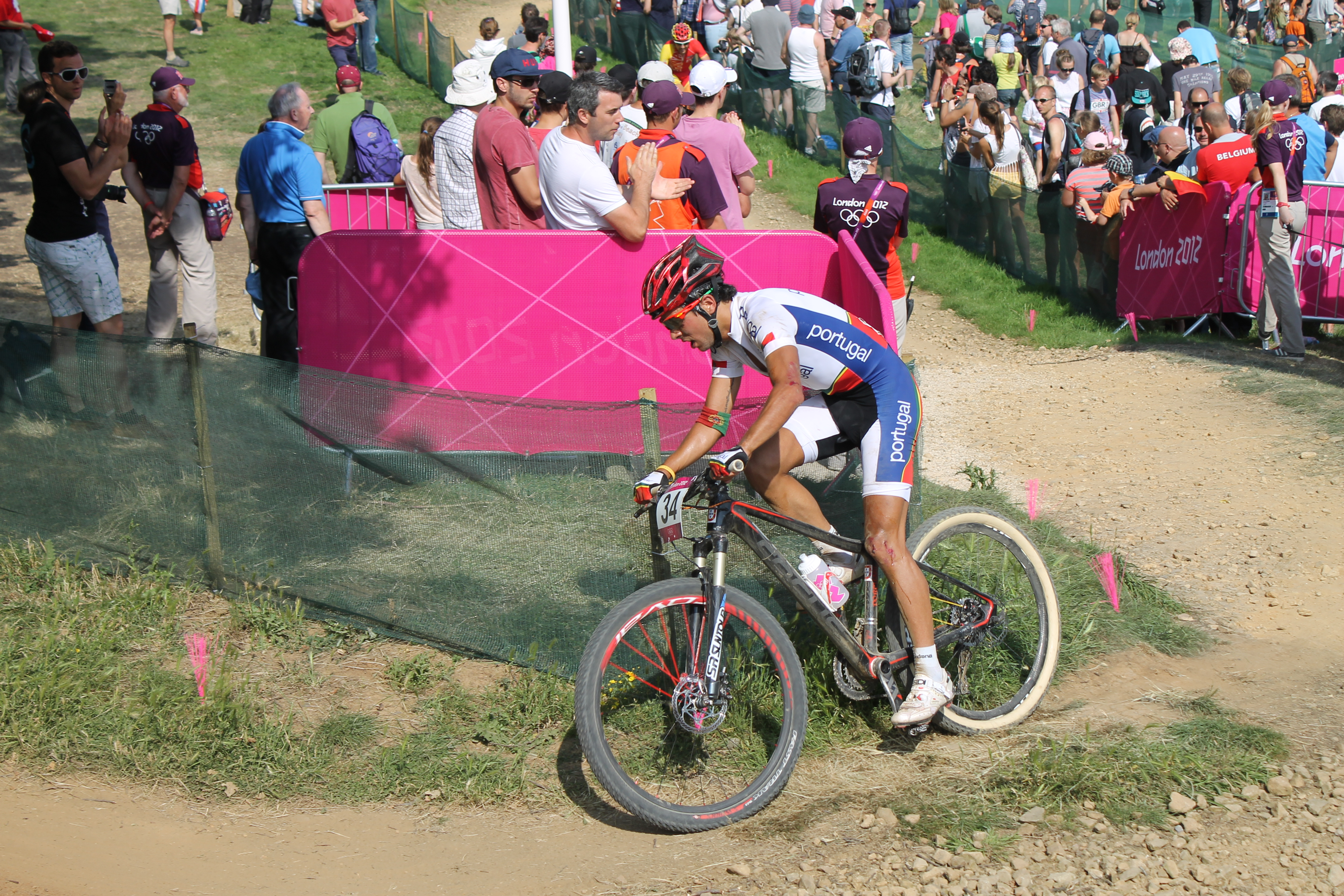
David Rosa in the men's cross-country race

=== Road ===
Athlete	Event	Time	Rank
Manuel Cardoso	Men's road race	5:46:37	49
Rui Costa	Men's road race	5:46:05	13
Nelson Oliveira	Men's road race	5:46:37	69
Nelson Oliveira	Men's time trial	54:41.57	18

=== Mountain biking ===
Athlete	Event	Time	Rank
David Rosa	Men's cross-country	1:33:50	23

== Equestrian ==
=== Dressage ===
Athlete	Horse	Event	Grand Prix		Grand Prix Special		Grand Prix Freestyle		Overall	
Athlete	Horse	Event	Score	Rank	Score	Rank	Technical	Artistic	Score	Rank
Gonçalo Carvalho	Rubi	Individual	71.520	22 Q	74.222	13 Q	74.643	80.571	77.607	16

=== Jumping ===
Athlete	Horse	Event	Qualification								Final				
Athlete	Horse	Event	Round 1		Round 2			Round 3			Round A		Round B		
Athlete	Horse	Event	Penalties	Rank	Penalties	Total	Rank	Penalties	Total	Rank	Penalties	Rank	Penalties	Total	Rank
Luciana Diniz	Lennox	Individual	8	=60 Q	0	8	=31 Q	4	12	=26 Q	1	=7 Q	9	10	=17

== Gymnastics ==
=== Artistic ===
Men

Athlete	Event	Qualification								Final							
Athlete	Event	Apparatus						Total	Rank	Apparatus						Total	Rank
Athlete	Event	F	PH	R	V	PB	HB	Total	Rank	F	PH	R	V	PB	HB	Total	Rank
Manuel Campos	All-around	14.166	12.500	14.433	14.200	14.400	13.200	82.899	35	did not advance							

Women

Athlete	Event	Qualification						Final					
Athlete	Event	Apparatus				Total	Rank	Apparatus				Total	Rank
Athlete	Event	F	V	UB	BB	Total	Rank	F	V	UB	BB	Total	Rank
Zoi Mafalda Marques de Lima	All-around	12.033	13.566	11.766	12.266	49.631	53	did not advance					

=== Trampoline ===
Athlete	Event	Qualification		Final	
Athlete	Event	Score	Rank	Score	Rank
Diogo Ganchinho	Men's	61.440	15	Did not advance	
Ana Rente	Women's	100.275	11	Did not advance	

== Judo ==
Athlete	Event	Round of 64	Round of 32	Round of 16	Quarterfinals	Semifinals	Repechage	Final / BM	
Athlete	Event	Opposition Result	Opposition Result	Opposition Result	Opposition Result	Opposition Result	Opposition Result	Opposition Result	Rank
João Pina	Men's −73 kg	Bye	Soroka (UKR); L 0011–0102	Did not advance					
Joana Ramos	Women's −52 kg	—N/a	Bye	Gneto (FRA); L 0000–1001	Did not advance				
Telma Monteiro	Women's −57 kg	—N/a	Malloy (USA); L 0000–0001	Did not advance					
Yahima Ramirez	Women's −78 kg	—N/a	Gibbons (GBR); L 0100–0000	Did not advance					

== Rowing ==
Men

Athlete	Event	Heats		Repechage		Semifinals		Final	
Athlete	Event	Time	Rank	Time	Rank	Time	Rank	Time	Rank
Pedro Fraga; Nuno Mendes	Lightweight double sculls	6:37.91	2 SA/B	Bye		6:37.99	3 FA	6:44.80	5

Qualification legend: FA=Final A (medal); FB=Final B (non-medal); FC=Final C (non-medal); FD=Final D (non-medal); FE=Final E (non-medal); FF=Final F (non-medal); SA/B=Semifinals A/B; SC/D=Semifinals C/D; SE/F=Semifinals E/F; QF=Quarterfinals; R=Repechage

== Sailing ==
Men

Athlete	Event	Race											Net points	Final rank
Athlete	Event	1	2	3	4	5	6	7	8	9	10	M*	Net points	Final rank
João Rodrigues	RS:X	20	16	9	11	23	7	~~25~~	22	20	3	EL	132	14
Gustavo Lima	Laser	21	24	27	~~35~~	13	18	3	20	34	13	EL	173	22
Álvaro Marinho; Miguel Nunes	470	12	2	16	5	11	7	17	3	10	~~28~~	10	93	8
Afonso Domingos; Frederico Melo	Star	14	15	15	~~16~~	9	10	7	14	10	14	EL	108	15

Women
Fleet racing

Athlete	Event	Race											Net points	Final rank
Athlete	Event	1	2	3	4	5	6	7	8	9	10	M*	Net points	Final rank
Carolina Mendelblatt	RS:X	Did not compete (Note: Mendelblatt did not show up for the first day of women's RS:X competition, justifying her absence to Mário Santos, the Portuguese chef de mission, due to "personal and medical reasons". Unable to be contacted for further enquiries and explanations, Santos cancelled Mendelblatt's accreditation.)												
Sara Carmo	Laser Radial	~~32~~	22	17	20	27	20	32	~~38~~	28	24	EL	222	28

Match racing

Athlete	Event	Round robin											Rank	Knockouts			Rank
Athlete	Event	FRA	FIN	USA	GBR	NZL	RUS	SWE	NED	ESP	DEN	AUS	Rank	Q-final	S-final	Final	Rank
Rita Gonçalves; Mariana Lobato; Diana Neves	Elliott 6m	L	L	L	L	L	L	W	L	L	L	L	11	Did not advance			

Open

Athlete	Event	Race																Net points	Final rank
Athlete	Event	1	2	3	4	5	6	7	8	9	10	11	12	13	14	15	M*	Net points	Final rank
Francisco Andrade; Bernardo Freitas	49er	7	2	10	9	10	6	~~13~~	5	8	12	9	10	5	14	15	14	134	8

M = Medal race; EL = Eliminated – did not advance into the medal race;

== Shooting ==
Men

Athlete	Event	Qualification		Final	
Athlete	Event	Points	Rank	Points	Rank
João Costa	10 m air pistol	583	8 Q	682.3	7
João Costa	50 m pistol	559	9	Did not advance	

Women

Athlete	Event	Qualification		Final	
Athlete	Event	Points	Rank	Points	Rank
Joana Castelão	10 m air pistol	381	15	Did not advance	
Joana Castelão	25 m pistol	571	33	Did not advance	

== Swimming ==
Portuguese swimmers have achieved qualifying standards in the swimming events (up to a maximum of two swimmers per event with the Olympic Qualifying Time (OQT), and potentially one with the Olympic Selection Time (OST)):

Men

Athlete	Event	Heat		Semifinal		Final	
Athlete	Event	Time	Rank	Time	Rank	Time	Rank
Carlos Almeida	100 m breaststroke	1:01.40	25	Did not advance			
Diogo Carvalho	200 m individual medley	2:00.40	18	Did not advance			
Diogo Carvalho	400 m individual medley	4:23.06	26	—N/a		Did not advance	
Arseniy Lavrentyev	10 km open water	—N/a				1:51:37.2	19
Simão Morgado	100 m butterfly	53.26	32	Did not advance			
Pedro Oliveira	200 m backstroke	1:58.83 NR	20	Did not advance			
Pedro Oliveira	200 m butterfly	1:58.45	22	Did not advance			
Tiago Venâncio	200 m freestyle	1:52.36	34	Did not advance			

Women

Athlete	Event	Heat		Semifinal		Final	
Athlete	Event	Time	Rank	Time	Rank	Time	Rank
Sara Oliveira	100 m butterfly	1:00.44	36	Did not advance			
Sara Oliveira	200 m butterfly	2:11.54	24	Did not advance			
Ana Rodrigues	100 m breaststroke	1:10.62	35	Did not advance			

== Table tennis ==
Athlete	Event	Preliminary round	Round 1	Round 2	Round 3	Round 4	Quarterfinals	Semifinals	Final / BM	
Athlete	Event	Opposition Result	Opposition Result	Opposition Result	Opposition Result	Opposition Result	Opposition Result	Opposition Result	Opposition Result	Rank
Marcos Freitas	Men's singles	Bye		Lin J (DOM); W 4–0	Oh S-E (KOR); L 0–4	Did not advance				
João Monteiro	Men's singles	Bye		Henzell (AUS); L 2–4	Did not advance					
Tiago Apolónia; Marcos Freitas; João Monteiro	Men's team	—N/a				Great Britain; W 3–0	South Korea; L 2–3	Did not advance		
Lei Huang Mendes	Women's singles	Bye	Komwong (THA); L 3–4	Did not advance						

== Triathlon ==
Portugal qualified two triathletes for the men's event.

Athlete	Event	Swim (1.5 km)	Trans 1	Bike (40 km)	Trans 2	Run (10 km)	Total Time	Rank
Bruno Pais	Men's	18:57	0:42	58:44	0:29	32:30	1:51:22	41
João Silva	Men's	17:22	0:36	58:54	0:26	30:33	1:47:51	9
