= Roland Kökény =

Hungarian canoeist (born 1975)

Medal record

Men's canoe sprint

Representing Hungary

Olympic Games
Gold medal – first place	2012 London	K-2 1000 m

World Championships
Gold medal – first place	2005 Zagreb	K-2 1000 m
Gold medal – first place	2006 Szeged	K-4 1000 m
Silver medal – second place	2001 Poznań	K-4 1000 m
Silver medal – second place	2003 Gainesville	K-4 1000 m
Bronze medal – third place	2013 Duisburg	K-2 1000 m

European Championships
Gold medal – first place	2012 Zagreb	K-2 1000 m
Bronze medal – third place	2011 Belgrade	K-2 1000 m

Roland Kökény (born 24 October 1975) is a Hungarian canoe sprinter who competed from the early 2000s in European and World Championships as well as the Olympic Games. A member of the Esztergom Kayak-Canoe club, he is 185 centimetres (6 ft 1 in) tall and weighs 82 kilograms (181 lb; 12.9 st).

== Biography ==
Born in Miskolc, Kökény won four medals at the ICF Canoe Sprint World Championships with two golds (K-2 1000 m: 2005, K-4 1000 m: 2006) and two silvers (K-4 1000 m: 2001, 2003).

Kökény also competed in three Summer Olympics, at the London Olympics of 2012, he won the gold medal together with Rudolf Dombi for his country in the Kayak Double (K2) 1000m. At the 2004 Summer Olympics in Athens he came sixth in the K-1 1000 m event.

== Awards ==
- Cross of Merit of the Republic of Hungary – Bronze Cross (2004)
- Hungarian kayaker of the Year (2): 2005, 2012
- Order of Merit of Hungary – Officer's Cross (2012)
- Honorary Citizen of Esztergom (2012)
- Perpetual champion of Hungarian Kayak-Canoe (2012)
- Member of the Hungarian team of year (Men's K-2 with Rudolf Dombi): 2012
- Honorary Citizen of Zugló (2012)
