= Canoeing at the 2012 Summer Olympics – Men's K-2 1000 metres =

Men's canoe sprint K-2 1,000 metres at the Games of the XXX Olympiad
- Venue: Eton Dorney
- Date: 6 to 8 August
- Competitors: 24 from 12 nations
- Winning time: 3:09.646

Medalists
1st place, gold medalist(s)		Rudolf Dombi; Roland Kökény	Hungary
2nd place, silver medalist(s)		Fernando Pimenta; Emanuel Silva	Portugal
3rd place, bronze medalist(s)		Martin Hollstein; Andreas Ihle	Germany

The men's canoe sprint K-2 1,000 metres competition at the 2012 Olympic Games in London took place between 6 and 8 August at Eton Dorney.

Rudolf Dombi and Roland Kökény from Hungary won the gold medal. Portugal's Fernando Pimenta and Emanuel Silva won silver — the country's only medal at the 2012 Games — and Martin Hollstein and Andreas Ihle from Germany took bronze.

== Competition format ==
The competition comprised heats, semifinals, and a final round. Heat winners advanced to the "A" final, with all other boats getting a second chance in the semifinals. The top three from each semifinal also advanced to the "A" final, and competed for medals. A placing "B" final was held for the other semifinalists.

== Schedule ==
All times are British Summer Time (UTC+01:00)

Date	Time	Round
Monday 6 August 2012	10:18; 11:30	Heats; Semifinals
Wednesday 8 August 2012	10:16	Finals

== Results ==
=== Heats ===
First boat qualified for the final, remainder go to semifinals.

==== Heat 1 ====
Rank	Canoer	Country	Time	Notes
1	Martin Hollstein; Andreas Ihle	Germany	3:15.263	Q
2	David Smith; Ken Wallace	Australia	3:19.073	
3	Peter Gelle; Erik Vlček	Slovakia	3:19.571	
4	Olivier Cauwenbergh; Laurens Pannecoucke	Belgium	3:24.304	
5	Alexey Dergunov; Yevgeniy Alexeyev	Kazakhstan	3:32.176	
6	Ryan Cochrane; Hugues Fournel	Canada	3:55.748	

==== Heat 2 ====
Rank	Canoer	Country	Time	Notes
1	Rudolf Dombi; Roland Kökény	Hungary	3:11.393	Q
2	Fernando Pimenta; Emanuel Silva	Portugal	3:13.710	
3	Markus Oscarsson; Henrik Nilsson	Sweden	3:16.590	
4	Darryl Fitzgerald; Steven Ferguson	New Zealand	3:16.608	
5	Kim Wraae; Emil Staer	Denmark	3:17.020	
6	Ilya Medvedev; Anton Ryakhov	Russia	3:21.086	

=== Semifinals ===
The fastest three canoeists in each semifinal qualify for the 'A' final. The slowest two canoeists in each semifinal qualify for the 'B' final.

==== Semifinal 1 ====
Rank	Canoer	Country	Time	Notes
1	Markus Oscarsson; Henrik Nilsson	Sweden	3:13.125	Q
2	David Smith; Ken Wallace	Australia	3:13.239	Q
3	Darryl Fitzgerald; Steven Ferguson	New Zealand	3:15.307	Q
4	Alexey Dergunov; Yevgeniy Alexeyev	Kazakhstan	3:17.788	
5	Ryan Cochrane; Hugues Fournel	Canada	3:29.819	

==== Semifinal 2 ====
Rank	Canoer	Country	Time	Notes
1	Peter Gelle; Erik Vlček	Slovakia	3:12.690	Q
2	Ilya Medvedev; Anton Ryakhov	Russia	3:12.901	Q
3	Fernando Pimenta; Emanuel Silva	Portugal	3:14.017	Q
4	Kim Wraae; Emil Staer	Denmark	3:15.580	
5	Olivier Cauwenbergh; Laurens Pannecoucke	Belgium	3:15.655	

=== Finals ===
==== Final B ====
Rank	Canoer	Country	Time
1	Kim Wraae; Emil Staer	Denmark	3:12.820
2	Olivier Cauwenbergh; Laurens Pannecoucke	Belgium	3:13.298
3	Alexey Dergunov; Yevgeniy Alexeyev	Kazakhstan	3:14.867
4	Ryan Cochrane; Hugues Fournel	Canada	3:18.550

==== Final A ====
Rank	Canoer	Country	Time
1st place, gold medalist(s)	Rudolf Dombi; Roland Kökény	Hungary	3:09.646
2nd place, silver medalist(s)	Fernando Pimenta; Emanuel Silva	Portugal	3:09.699
3rd place, bronze medalist(s)	Martin Hollstein; Andreas Ihle	Germany	3:10.117
4	David Smith; Ken Wallace	Australia	3:11.456
5	Markus Oscarsson; Henrik Nilsson	Sweden	3:11.803
6	Ilya Medvedev; Anton Ryakhov	Russia	3:12.047
7	Darryl Fitzgerald; Steven Ferguson	New Zealand	3:12.117
8	Peter Gelle; Erik Vlček	Slovakia	3:12.519
