= Ilya Medvedev =

Russian canoeist

Personal information
- Full name: Ilya Leonidovich Medvedev
- Born: 18 November 1983 (age 42) St. Petersburg
- Height: 194 cm (6 ft 4 in)
- Weight: 80 kg (176 lb)
Medal record
Men's canoe sprint
Representing Russia
World Championships
Bronze medal – third place	2010 Poznań	K-2 1000 m
Bronze medal – third place	2011 Szeged	K-4 1000 m
European Championships
Silver medal – second place	2013 Montemor-o-Velho	K-2 1000 m

Ilya Leonidovich Medvedev (Илья Леонидович Медведев, born 18 November 1983) is a Russian sprint canoer who competed since the late 2000s. He won two bronze medals in the K-2 1000 m event at the 2010 ICF Canoe Sprint World Championships in Poznań and in the K-4 1000 m event at the 2011 ICF Canoe Sprint World Championships in Szeged.

At the 2008 Summer Olympics in Beijing, Medvedev finished eighth the K-4 1000 m event. At the 2012 Summer Olympics, he finished sixth in the K-2 1000 m and seventh in the K-4 1000 m.
