= Rudolf Dombi =

Hungarian sprint canoer

Personal information
- Nationality: Hungarian
- Born: 9 November 1986 (age 39) Budapest, Hungary

Sport
- Sport: Canoe sprint
- Club: Újpesti TE (2015- ) Építők ( -2014)
- Coached by: Katalin Szilárdi
Medal record
Men's sprint canoeing
Representing Hungary
Olympic Games
| Gold medal – first place | 2012 London | K-2 1000 m |
World Championships
| Silver medal – second place | 2014 Moscow | K-2 500 m |
| Bronze medal – third place | 2013 Duisburg | K-2 1000 m |

Rudolf Dombi (born 9 November 1986) is a Hungarian sprint canoer. He and his partner Roland Kökény won the gold medal at the 2012 Summer Olympics in the K-2 1000 metres event.
