= Andreas Ihle =

German canoeist (born 1979)

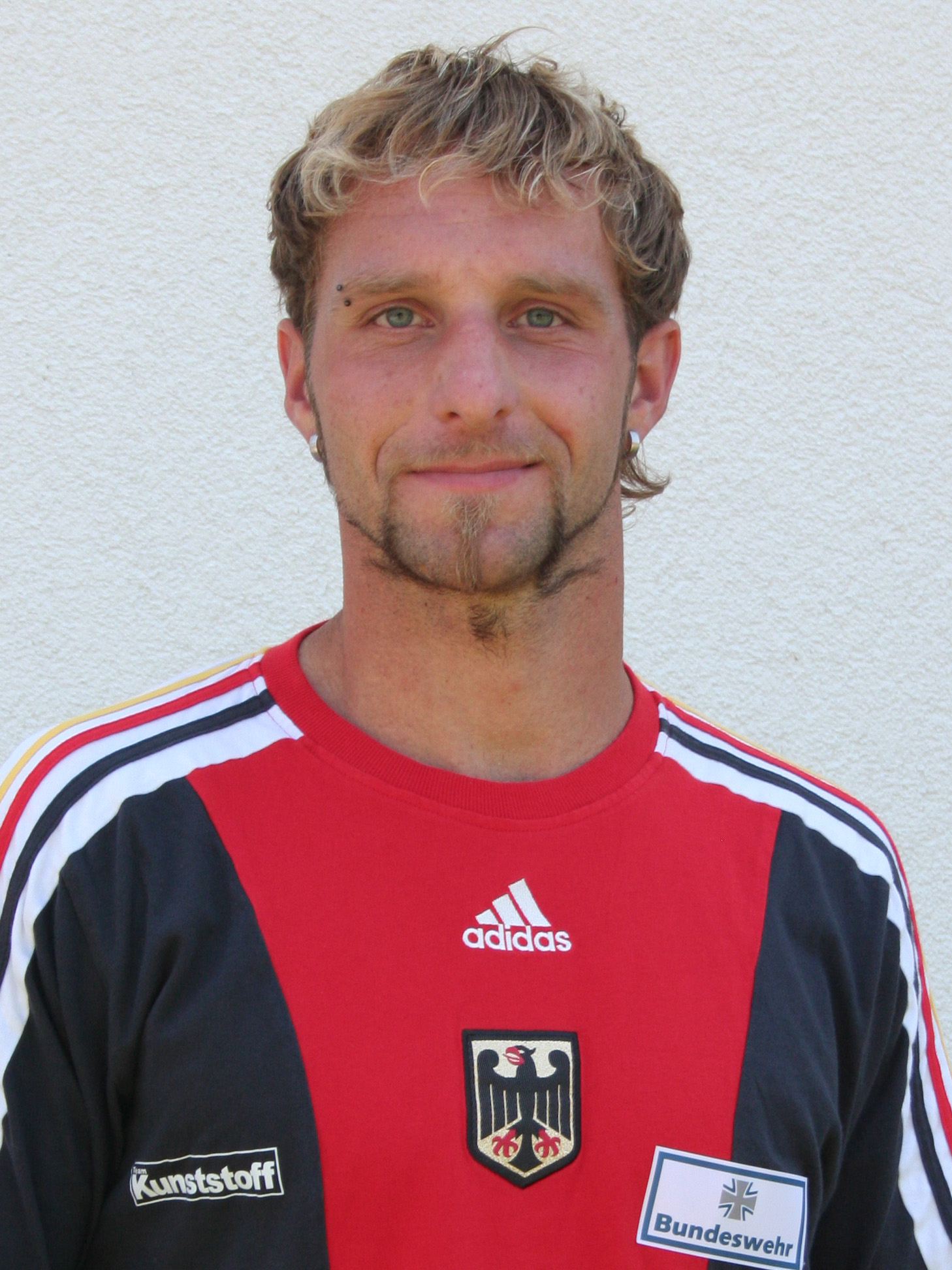

Medal record

Men's canoe sprint

Representing Germany

Olympic Games
Gold medal – first place	2008 Beijing	K-2 1000 m
Silver medal – second place	2004 Athens	K-4 1000 m
Bronze medal – third place	2012 London	K-2 1000 m

World Championships
Gold medal – first place	2001 Poznań	K-4 1000 m
Gold medal – first place	2010 Poznań	K-2 1000 m
Silver medal – second place	2002 Seville	K-4 1000 m
Silver medal – second place	2005 Zagreb	K-2 1000 m
Silver medal – second place	2006 Szeged	K-2 1000 m
Bronze medal – third place	2003 Gainesville	K-4 1000 m

European Championships
Gold medal – first place	2011 Belgrade	K-2 1000 m
Silver medal – second place	2012 Zagreb	K-2 1000 m

Andreas Ihle (born 2 June 1979 in Bad Dürrenberg, Saxony-Anhalt) is a German canoe sprinter who has competed since 1997. Competing in three Summer Olympics, he has won three medals with a gold (K-2 1000 m: 2008), a silver (K-4 1000 m: 2004) and a bronze (K-2 1000 m: 2012).

Ihle also won six medals at the ICF Canoe Sprint World Championships with two gold (K-2 1000 m: 2010, K-4 1000 m: 2001), three silvers (K-2 1000 m: 2005, 2006; K-4 1000 m: 2002), and a bronze (K-4 1000 m: 2003).

Ihle is a member of the Magdeburg club. Ihle measures at 1.84 m / 6'0 tall and weighs 78 kg / 172 lbs.
