= Australia at the 2004 Summer Olympics =

- IOC code: AUS
- NOC: Australian Olympic Committee
- Website: www.olympics.com.au

in Athens
- Competitors: 470 in 35 sports
- Flag bearers: Colin Beashel (opening); Petria Thomas (closing)
- Medals Ranked 4th: Gold 17 Silver 16 Bronze 17 Total 50

Summer Olympics appearances (overview)
- 1896; 1900; 1904; 1908; 1912; 1920; 1924; 1928; 1932; 1936; 1948; 1952; 1956; 1960; 1964; 1968; 1972; 1976; 1980; 1984; 1988; 1992; 1996; 2000; 2004; 2008; 2012; 2016; 2020; 2024; 2028

Other related appearances
- 1906 Intercalated Games –––– Australasia (1908–1912)

Australia, the previous host of the 2000 Olympics at Sydney, competed at the 2004 Summer Olympics in Athens, Greece from 13 to 29 August 2004. Australian athletes have competed in every Summer Olympic Games of the modern era. The Australian Olympic Committee sent a total of 470 athletes (268 men and 202 women) to the Games to compete in 29 sports.

Australia finished the Athens Games having won a total of 50 medals, including 17 gold, the most gold medals to date although this was equalled in Tokyo 2020 and surpassed its total in Paris 2024 with 18 gold medals. Its strongest sports were swimming, cycling, diving, and rowing.

== Medalists ==
Medals by sport
Sport	1st place, gold medalist(s)	2nd place, silver medalist(s)	3rd place, bronze medalist(s)	Total
Swimming	7	5	3	15
Cycling	6	2	3	11
Diving	1	1	4	6
Rowing	1	1	2	4
Shooting	1	0	1	2
Field hockey	1	0	0	1
Canoeing	0	2	0	2
Athletics	0	1	2	3
Baseball	0	1	0	1
Basketball	0	1	0	1
Triathlon	0	1	0	1
Softball	0	1	0	1
Archery	0	0	1	1
Tennis	0	0	1	1
Total	17	16	17	50

Medal	Name	Sport	Event	Date
Gold	Ian Thorpe	Swimming	Men's 400 m freestyle	August 14
Gold	Alice Tait; Jodie Henry; Lisbeth Lenton; Sarah Ryan; Petria Thomas	Swimming	Women's 4 × 100 m freestyle relay	August 14
Gold	Sara Carrigan	Cycling	Women's road race	August 15
Gold	Petria Thomas	Swimming	Women's 100 m butterfly	August 15
Gold	Suzanne Balogh	Shooting	Women's trap	August 16
Gold	Ian Thorpe	Swimming	Men's 200 m freestyle	August 16
Gold	Jodie Henry	Swimming	Women's 100 m freestyle	August 19
Gold	Anna Meares	Cycling	Women's track time trial	August 20
Gold	Drew Ginn; James Tomkins	Rowing	Men's pair	August 21
Gold	Grant Hackett	Swimming	Men's 1500 m freestyle	August 21
Gold	Jodie Henry; Brooke Hanson; Leisel Jones; Alice Tait; Giaan Rooney; Jessicah Schipper; Petria Thomas	Swimming	Women's 4 × 100 m medley relay	August 21
Gold	Chantelle Newbery	Diving	Women's 10 m platform	August 22
Gold	Graeme Brown; Peter Dawson; Brett Lancaster; Brad McGee; Luke Roberts; Stephen Wooldridge	Cycling	Men's team pursuit	August 23
Gold	Ryan Bayley	Cycling	Men's sprint	August 24
Gold	Ryan Bayley	Cycling	Men's keirin	August 25
Gold	Graeme Brown; Stuart O'Grady	Cycling	Men's madison	August 25
Gold	Australia men's national field hockey team: Michael Brennan; Travis Brooks; Dean Butler; Jamie Dwyer; Nathan Eglington; Troy Elder; Bevan George; Robert Hammond; Mark Hickman; Mark Knowles; Brent Livermore; Michael McCann; Stephen Mowlam; Grant Schubert; Matthew Wells	Field hockey	Men's tournament	August 28
Silver	Grant Hackett	Swimming	Men's 400 m freestyle	August 14
Silver	Brooke Hanson	Swimming	Women's 100 m breaststroke	August 16
Silver	Grant Hackett; Michael Klim; Antony Matkovich; Todd Pearson; Nicholas Sprenger; Craig Stevens; Ian Thorpe	Swimming	Men's 4 × 200 m freestyle relay	August 17
Silver	Petria Thomas	Swimming	Women's 200 m butterfly	August 18
Silver	Leisel Jones	Swimming	Women's 200 m breaststroke	August 19
Silver	Brad McGee	Cycling	Men's individual pursuit	August 21
Silver	Katie Mactier	Cycling	Women's individual pursuit	August 22
Silver	Ben Cureton; Simon Burgess; Anthony Edwards; Glen Loftus	Rowing	Men's lightweight four	August 22
Silver	Australia women's national softball team: Sandra Allen; Marissa Carpadios; Fiona Crawford; Amanda Doman; Peta Edebone; Tanya Harding; Natalie Hodgskin; Simmone Morrow; Tracey Mosley; Stacey Porter; Melanie Roche; Natalie Titcume; Natalie Ward; Brooke Wilkins; Kerry Wyborn	Softball	Women's tournament	August 23
Silver	Australia national baseball team: Craig Anderson; Tom Brice; Adrian Burnside; Gavin Fingleson; Paul Gonzalez; Nick Kimpton; Brendan Kingman; Craig Lewis; Graeme Lloyd; David Nilsson; Trent Oeltjen; Wayne Ough; Chris Oxspring; Brett Roneberg; Ryan Rowland-Smith; John Stephens; Phil Stockman; Brett Tamburrino; Rich Thompson; Andrew Utting; Rodney Van Buizen; Ben Wigmore; Glenn Williams; Jeff Williams	Baseball	Men's tournament	August 25
Silver	Loretta Harrop	Triathlon	Women's event	August 25
Silver	Patrick Dwyer; Clinton Hill; Mark Ormrod; John Steffensen	Athletics	Men's 4 × 400 m relay	August 28
Silver	Australia women's national basketball team: Suzy Batkovic; Sandy Brondello; Trisha Fallon; Kristi Harrower; Lauren Jackson; Natalie Porter; Alicia Poto; Belinda Snell; Rachael Sporn; Laura Summerton; Penny Taylor; Allison Tranquilli	Basketball	Women's tournament	August 28
Silver	Nathan Baggaley	Canoeing	Men's K-1 500 m	August 28
Silver	Nathan Baggaley; Clint Robinson	Canoeing	Men's K-2 500 m	August 28
Silver	Mathew Helm	Diving	Men's 10 m platform	August 28
Bronze	Irina Lashko; Chantelle Newbery	Diving	Women's synchronized 3 m springboard	August 14
Bronze	Mathew Helm; Robert Newbery	Diving	Men's synchronized 10 m platform	August 14
Bronze	Adam Vella	Shooting	Men's trap	August 15
Bronze	Steven Barnett; Robert Newbery	Diving	Men's synchronized 3 m springboard	August 16
Bronze	Loudy Tourky	Diving	Women's 10 m platform	August 16
Bronze	Leisel Jones	Swimming	Women's 100 m breaststroke	August 16
Bronze	Michael Rogers	Cycling	Men's road time trial	August 18
Bronze	Ian Thorpe	Swimming	Men's 100 m freestyle	August 18
Bronze	Tim Cuddihy	Archery	Men's individual	August 19
Bronze	Nathan Deakes	Athletics	Men's 20 km walk	August 21
Bronze	Lisbeth Lenton	Swimming	Women's 50 m freestyle	August 21
Bronze	Alicia Molik	Tennis	Women's singles	August 21
Bronze	Amber Bradley; Dana Faletic; Kerry Hore; Rebecca Sattin	Rowing	Women's quadruple sculls	August 22
Bronze	Boden Hanson; Mike McKay; Stuart Reside; Geoff Stewart; James Stewart; Stephen Stewart; Stefan Szczurowski; Michael Toon (cox); Stuart Welch	Rowing	Men's eight	August 22
Bronze	Jane Saville	Athletics	Women's 20 km walk	August 23
Bronze	Anna Meares	Cycling	Women's sprint	August 24
Bronze	Shane Kelly	Cycling	Men's keirin	August 25

== Archery ==
Men

Athlete	Event	Ranking round		Round of 64	Round of 32	Round of 16	Quarterfinals	Semifinals	Final / BM	
Athlete	Event	Score	Seed	Opposition Score	Opposition Score	Opposition Score	Opposition Score	Opposition Score	Opposition Score	Rank
David Barnes	Individual	649	31	Andersson (SWE); L 151–160	Did not advance					
Tim Cuddihy	Individual	663	12	Naglieri (FRA); W 148–127	Frankenberg (GER); W 164–163	Jang Y-H (KOR); W 166–165	Park K-M (KOR); W 112–111	Yamamoto (JPN); L 115 (9)–115 (10)	Godfrey (GBR); W 113–112	3rd place, bronze medalist(s)
Simon Fairweather	Individual	658	20	Prylepau (BLR); L 137–141	Did not advance					
David Barnes; Tim Cuddihy; Simon Fairweather	Team	1962	7	—N/a		India; W 248–236	Chinese Taipei; L 247–250	Did not advance		

Women

Athlete	Event	Ranking round		Round of 64	Round of 32	Round of 16	Quarterfinals	Semifinals	Final / BM	
Athlete	Event	Score	Seed	Opposition Score	Opposition Score	Opposition Score	Opposition Score	Opposition Score	Opposition Score	Rank
Deonne Bridger	Individual	620	39	Beloslydtseva (KAZ); L 145–150	Did not advance					
Jo-Ann Galbraith	Individual	596	57	Psarra (GRE); L 116–138	Did not advance					
Melissa Jennison	Individual	628	29	Arnold (USA); W 132–121	He Y (CHN); L 158 (8)–158 (9)	Did not advance				
Deonne Bridger; Jo-Ann Galbraith; Melissa Jennison	Team	1844	15	—N/a		China; L 233–248	Did not advance			

== Athletics ==
Key

- Note–Ranks given for track events are within the athlete's heat only
- Q = Qualified for the next round
- q = Qualified for the next round as a fastest loser or, in field events, by position without achieving the qualifying target
- NR = National record
- N/A = Round not applicable for the event
- Bye = Athlete not required to compete in round

Men
Track & road events

Athlete	Event	Heat		Quarterfinal		Semifinal		Final	
Athlete	Event	Result	Rank	Result	Rank	Result	Rank	Result	Rank
Luke Adams	20 km walk	—N/a						1:23:52	16
Sisay Bezabeh	Marathon	—N/a						2:25:26	60
Nathan Deakes	20 km walk	—N/a						1:20:02	3rd place, bronze medalist(s)
Nathan Deakes	50 km walk	—N/a						DSQ	
Nicholas Harrison	Marathon	—N/a						2:21:42	45
Clinton Hill	400 m	45.89	4	—N/a		Did not advance			
Adam Miller	200 m	21.31	8	Did not advance					
Craig Mottram	5000 m	13:21.88	4 Q	—N/a				13:25.70	8
Peter Nowill	3000 m steeplechase	8:29.14	7	—N/a				Did not advance	
Joshua Ross	100 m	10.24	3 Q	10.22	5	Did not advance			
Lee Troop	Marathon	—N/a						2:18:46	28
Casey Vincent	400 m	46.09	4	—N/a		Did not advance			
Adam Basil; Paul di Bella; Patrick Johnson; Joshua Ross	4 × 100 m relay	38.49	3 Q	—N/a				38.56	6
Patrick Dwyer; Clinton Hill; Mark Ormrod; John Steffensen	4 × 400 m relay	3:03.06	4 q	—N/a				3:00.60	2nd place, silver medalist(s)

Field events

Athlete	Event	Qualification		Final	
Athlete	Event	Distance	Position	Distance	Position
Justin Anlezark	Shot put	20.45	6 Q	20.31	6
Paul Burgess	Pole vault	5.70	=1 Q	5.55	=11
Oliver Dziubak	Javelin throw	78.53	19	Did not advance	
William Hamlyn-Harris	Javelin throw	77.43	21	Did not advance	
Steven Hooker	Pole vault	5.30	=29	Did not advance	
Dmitri Markov	Pole vault	5.50	=22	Did not advance	
Andrew Murphy	Triple jump	16.82	14	Did not advance	
Stuart Rendell	Hammer throw	72.61	25	Did not advance	

Women
Track & road events

Athlete	Event	Heat		Quarterfinal		Semifinal		Final	
Athlete	Event	Result	Rank	Result	Rank	Result	Rank	Result	Rank
Lauren Hewitt	200 m	22.87	4 Q	23.44	8	Did not advance			
Sarah Jamieson	1500 m	4:09.25	10	—N/a		Did not advance			
Tamsyn Lewis	800 m	2:02.67	5	—N/a		Did not advance			
Kerryn McCann	Marathon	—N/a						2:41:41	31
Haley McGregor	10000 m	—N/a						33:35.27	25
Jana Pittman	400 m hurdles	54.83	1 Q	—N/a		54.05	2 Q	53.92	5
Jane Saville	20 km walk	—N/a						1:29:25	3rd place, bronze medalist(s)
Natalie Saville	20 km walk	—N/a						1:36:54	36
Cheryl Webb	20 km walk	—N/a						1:37:40	38
Benita Willis	10000 m	—N/a						32:32.01	24

Field events

Athlete	Event	Qualification		Final	
Athlete	Event	Distance	Position	Distance	Position
Bronwyn Eagles	Hammer throw	64.09	32	Did not advance	
Kym Howe	Pole vault	4.30	16	Did not advance	
Brooke Krueger	Hammer throw	63.88	33	Did not advance	
Petrina Price	High jump	1.80	34	Did not advance	
Bronwyn Thompson	Long jump	6.80	2 Q	6.96	4

Combined events – Heptathlon

Athlete	Event	100H	HJ	SP	200 m	LJ	JT	800 m	Final	Rank
Kylie Wheeler	Result	13.88	1.79	13.18	24.35	6.36	37.77	2:17.65	6090	18
Kylie Wheeler	Points	995	966	739	947	962	625	856	6090	18

== Badminton ==
Australia sent a team of eight badminton players to Athens. None of them surpassed the first round of elimination.

Men

Athlete	Event	Round of 32	Round of 16	Quarterfinal	Semifinal	Final / BM	
Athlete	Event	Opposition Score	Opposition Score	Opposition Score	Opposition Score	Opposition Score	Rank
Stuart Brehaut	Singles	Lee H-I (KOR); L 3–15, 2–15	Did not advance				
Ashley Brehaut; Travis Denney	Doubles	Panvisvas / Teerawiwatana (THA); L 3–15, 9–15	Did not advance				

Women

Athlete	Event	Round of 32	Round of 16	Quarterfinal	Semifinal	Final / BM	
Athlete	Event	Opposition Score	Opposition Score	Opposition Score	Opposition Score	Opposition Score	Rank
Lenny Permana	Singles	Morgan (GBR); L 5–11, 3–11	Did not advance				
Jane Crabtree; Kate Wilson-Smith	Doubles	Harder / Schjoldager (DEN); L 2–15, 3–15	Did not advance				

Mixed

Athlete	Event	Round of 32	Round of 16	Quarterfinal	Semifinal	Final / BM	
Athlete	Event	Opposition Score	Opposition Score	Opposition Score	Opposition Score	Opposition Score	Rank
Travis Denney; Kate Wilson-Smith	Doubles	Pitro / Siegemund (GER); L 5–15, 15–8, 4–15	Did not advance				

== Baseball ==
Australia advanced into the final game after defeating a Japanese team made up of professional players in Semifinal 1–0. Lost to Cuba in Final 2–6.

Team Roster

Manager: 24 - Jon Deeble.

Coaches: 2 - Tony Harris, 33 - Paul Elliott, 34 - Philip Dale.

Pos.	No.	Player	Date of birth (age)	Bats	Throws	Club
P	3	Jeff Williams	6 June 1972			(Japan) Hanshin Tigers
IF	4	Gavin Fingleson	5 August 1976			(United States) New Haven County Cutters
OF	5	Brett Tamburrino	10 November 1981			(United States) Fort Myers Miracle
IF	6	Rodney van Buizen	25 September 1981			(United States) Vero Beach Dodgers
C	7	Andrew Utting	9 September 1977			(Australia) Surfers Paradise
OF	8	Trent Oeltjen	28 February 1983			(United States) Swing of the Quad Cities
OF	10	Nick Kimpton	27 October 1983			(United States) Rancho Cucamonga Quakes
P	11	Ryan Rowland-Smith	26 January 1983			(United States) Inland Empire 66ers
C	14	David Nilsson	14 December 1969			(Australia) Redcliffe Padres
C	16	Ben Wigmore	17 January 1982			(Australia) Kensington Cardinals
OF	17	Brett Roneberg	5 February 1979			(United States) Pawtucket Red Sox
IF	18	Glenn Williams	18 July 1977			(United States) Syracuse Sky Chiefs
P	19	Richard Thompson	1 July 1984			(United States) Rancho Cucamonga Quakes
P	20	Wayne Ough	27 November 1973			(United States) Binghamton Mets
IF	22	Brendan Kingman	22 May 1973			(United States) Brockton Rox
IF	23	Paul Gonzalez	22 April 1969			(Australia) Redcliffe Padres
OF	25	Thomas Brice	24 August 1981			(United States) Kannapolis Intimidators
OF	26	Craig Lewis	30 December 1976			(United States) Brockton Rox
P	27	Graeme Lloyd	9 April 1967			
P	28	John Stephens	15 November 1979			(United States) Pawtucket Red Sox
P	31	Craig Anderson	30 October 1980			(United States) Tacoma Rainiers
P	35	Chris Oxspring	13 May 1977			(United States) Portland Beavers
P	39	Phil Stockman	25 January 1980			(United States) Tucson Sidewinders
P	40	Adrian Burnside	15 March 1977			(United States) Toledo Mud Hens

Preliminary Round

Team	W	L	Tiebreaker
Japan	6	1	1-0
Cuba	6	1	0-1
Canada	5	2	-
Australia	4	3	-
Chinese Taipei	3	4	-
Netherlands	2	5	-
Greece	1	6	1-0
Italy	1	6	0-1

15 August

Team	1	2	3	4	5	6	7	8	9	R	H	E
Australia	0	0	0	0	0	0	0	0	1	1	5	3
Cuba	1	0	1	0	0	1	1	0	x	4	10	1
WP: Adiel Palma (1-0) LP: Craig Anderson (0-1) Sv: Jonder Martinez (1S); Home runs: AUS: None; CUB: M. Enriquez in 1st, 1 RBI; O.Urrutia in 6th, 1 RBI

August 16

Team	1	2	3	4	5	6	7	8	9	R	H	E
Chinese Taipei	0	0	2	0	0	0	0	1	0	3	8	2
Australia	0	0	0	0	0	0	0	0	0	0	5	1
WP: Wang Chien-Ming (1-0) LP: John Stephens (0-1) Sv: Tsao Chin-Hui (1S)

August 17

Team	1	2	3	4	5	6	7	8	9	R	H	E
Australia	0	0	0	0	0	0	2	4	0	6	12	0
Italy	0	0	0	0	0	0	0	0	0	0	1	1
WP: Chris Oxspring (1-0) LP: Michael Marchesano (0-1)

August 18

Team	1	2	3	4	5	6	7	8	9	R	H	E
Australia	0	0	0	3	0	0	3	3	0	9	15	1
Japan	0	0	0	1	3	0	0	0	0	4	9	1
WP: Ryan Rowland-Smith (1-0) LP: Daisuke Miura (0-1) Sv: Jeff Williams (1S); Home runs: AUS: D. Nilsson in 8th, 1 RBI; JPN: K. Fukudome in 5th, 3 RBIs

August 20

Team	1	2	3	4	5	6	7	8	9	R	H	E
Greece	3	1	0	0	0	1	0	1	0	6	14	0
Australia	0	0	3	0	0	2	5	1	x	11	10	0
WP: Ryan Rowland-Smith (2-0) LP: Sean Spencer (0-1); Home runs: GRE: P. Maestrales in 2nd, 1 RBI; J. Kavourias in 8th, 1 RBI; AUS: B. Roneberg in 3rd; P. Gonzalez in 3rd, 2 RBIs; G. Roneberg in 6th, 1 RBI; 1 RBI; B. Kingman in 7th, 3 RBIs

August 21

Team	1	2	3	4	5	6	7	R	H	E
Australia	9	5	5	1	0	2	0	22	17	2
Netherlands	0	1	0	0	1	0	0	2	4	1
WP: Craig Lewis (1-0) LP: Calvin Maduro (0-2); Home runs: AUS: B. Roneberg in 1st, 2 RBIs; R. van Buizen in 3rd, 4 RBIs; G. Fingleson in 2nd, 3 RBIs; G. Williams in 6th, 2 RBIs; NED: Y. de Caster in 2nd, 1 RBI; R. Millard in 5th, 1 RBI

August 22

Team	1	2	3	4	5	6	7	8	9	R	H	E
Canada	0	0	3	2	0	0	0	0	6	11	12	0
Australia	0	0	0	0	0	0	0	0	0	0	4	2
WP: Phil Devey (1-0) LP: Adrian Burnside (0-1); Home runs: CAN: J. Ware in 9th, 3 RBIs; R. Radmanovich in 4th, 2 RBIs; AUS: None

Semifinals

24 August

Team	1	2	3	4	5	6	7	8	9	R	H	E
Australia	0	0	0	0	0	1	0	0	0	1	5	2
Japan	0	0	0	0	0	0	0	0	0	0	5	0
WP: Chris Oxspring (2-0) LP: Daisuke Matsuzaka (1-1) Sv: Jeff Williams (2S)

Gold Medal Final

25 August

Team	1	2	3	4	5	6	7	8	9	R	H	E
Cuba	0	0	0	2	0	4	0	0	0	6	13	1
Australia	0	0	0	0	1	0	0	1	0	2	7	0
WP: Adiel Palma (3-0) LP: John Stephens (0-2) Sv: Danny Betancourt (1-0-2); Home runs: CUB: F. Cepeda in 4th, 2 RBIs; AUS: P. Gonzalez in 5th, 1 RBI

Won Silver Medal

== Basketball ==
Australia has qualified both men's and women's teams.

- Men's team event – 1 team of 12 players
- Women's team event – 1 team of 12 players

=== Men's tournament ===
Roster

The following is the Australia roster in the men's basketball tournament of the 2004 Summer Olympics.

Australia men's national basketball team – 2004 Summer Olympics roster
Players
Coaches

Pos.	No.	Name	Age – Date of birth	Height	Club	Ctr.
F	4	Tony Ronaldson	32 – 25 May 1972	2.03 m (6 ft 8 in)	Perth Wildcats	(Australia)
G	5	Brett Maher	31 – 17 April 1973	1.88 m (6 ft 2 in)	Adelaide 36ers	(Australia)
F	6	Andrew Bogut	19 – 28 November 1984	2.07 m (6 ft 9 in)	Utah Utes	(United States)
F	7	Martin Cattalini	30 – 4 October 1973	2.02 m (6 ft 8 in)	Adelaide 36ers	(Australia)
G	8	John Rillie	32 – 4 November 1971	1.95 m (6 ft 5 in)	West Sydney Razorbacks	(Australia)
G	9	C. J. Bruton	28 – 13 December 1975	1.88 m (6 ft 2 in)	Sydney Kings	(Australia)
G/F	10	Jason Smith	29 – 20 October 1974	1.94 m (6 ft 4 in)	Sydney Kings	(Australia)
G	11	Shane Heal (C)	33 – 6 September 1970	1.83 m (6 ft 0 in)	Sydney Kings	(Australia)
F	12	Glen Saville	28 – 17 January 1976	1.99 m (6 ft 6 in)	Wollongong Hawks	(Australia)
C	13	David Andersen	24 – 23 June 1980	2.12 m (6 ft 11 in)	Montepaschi Siena	(Italy)
F	14	Matthew Nielsen	26 – 3 February 1978	2.09 m (6 ft 10 in)	Sydney Kings	(Australia)
C	15	Paul Rogers	30 – 29 September 1973	2.08 m (6 ft 10 in)	Casademont Girona	(Spain)

Head coach

- (Australia) Brian Goorjian

Assistant coach(es)

- (Australia) Brendan Joyce
- (Canada) Ken Shields

Legend

- (C) Team captain
- nat field describes country
  of last club
  before the tournament
- Age as of August 13, 2004

Group play

Pos	Team	Pld	W	L	PF	PA	PD	Pts	Qualification
1	Lithuania	5	5	0	468	414	+54	10	Quarterfinals
2	Greece	5	3	2	389	343	+46	8 (Note: Head-to-head record: Greece 1–1 (1.10 GAvg), Puerto Rico 1–1 (0.99), United States 1–1 (0.92))	Quarterfinals
3	Puerto Rico	5	3	2	410	411	−1	8	Quarterfinals
4	United States	5	3	2	418	389	+29	8	Quarterfinals
5	Australia	5	1	4	383	411	−28	6	9th place playoff
6	Angola	5	0	5	321	421	−100	5	11th place playoff

Source: FIBA archive
Rules for classification: 1) points; 2) head-to-head points; 3) head-to-head goal average; 4) head-to-head number of points scored.
Notes:

15 August 2004
22:15

Greece	76–54	Australia
Scoring by quarter: 23–18, 12–15, 24–18, 17–3
Pts: Papadopoulos 21; Rebs: Papadopoulos 9 Asts: Papaloukas 4		Pts: Heal, Maher 12 each Rebs: Nielsen 6 Asts: Andersen, Heal 1 each

Helliniko Indoor Arena, Athens
Attendance: 11,500
Referees: Pablo Estevez (ARG), José Ronfini (MEX)

17 August 2004
11:15

Australia	83–59	Angola
Scoring by quarter: 21–13, 24–16, 27–15, 11–15
Pts: Heal 18; Rebs: Bogut 11; Asts: Smith 3		Pts: Monteiro 18; Rebs: Gomes 9 Asts: 4 players, 1 each

Helliniko Indoor Arena, Athens
Attendance: 2,400
Referees: Renato Santos (BRA), Vladimir Okhrimenko (RUS)

19 August 2004
14:30

United States	89–79	Australia
Scoring by quarter: 21–31, 26–20, 18–16, 24–12
Pts: Duncan 18; Rebs: Duncan 11; Asts: James, Marbury 5 each		Pts: Heal 17; Rebs: Andersen, Bogut 8 Asts: Heal 7

Helliniko Indoor Arena, Athens
Attendance: 12,000
Referees: José Ronfini (MEX), Giampaolo Cicoria (ITA)

21 August 2004
9:00

Australia	82–87	Puerto Rico
Scoring by quarter: 23–13, 28–28, 17–24, 14–22
Pts: Nielsen 20; Rebs: Bogut 11; Asts: Heal 6		Pts: Santiago 20; Rebs: Ortiz 6 Asts: Arroyo 7

Helliniko Indoor Arena, Athens
Attendance: 6,500
Referees: Vicente Bulto (ESP), Pablo Estevez (ARG)

23 August 2004
11:15

Lithuania	100–85	Australia
Scoring by quarter: 20–19, 32–9, 23–38, 25–19
Pts: Javtokas 23; Rebs: Javtokas 9 Asts: Jasikevičius 4		Pts: Bogut, Saville 21 each Rebs: Bogut 9 Asts: Heal 3

Helliniko Indoor Arena, Athens
Attendance: 7,650
Referees: Vicente Bulto (ESP), Alejandro Chiti (ARG)

Classification round (9th–10th place)

24 August 2004
16:45

9th place

New Zealand	80–98	Australia
Scoring by quarter: 15–28, 19–20, 18–26, 28–24
Pts: Jones 26; Rebs: Marks 6 Asts: Dickel 3		Pts: Heal 30; Rebs: Bogut 10; Asts: 3 players, 3 each

Helliniko Indoor Arena, Athens
Attendance: 4,250
Referees: Zoran Šutulović (SCG), Vladimir Okhrimenko (RUS)

=== Women's tournament ===
Roster

The following is the Australia roster in the women's basketball tournament of the 2004 Summer Olympics.

Australia women's national basketball team – 2004 Summer Olympics roster
Players
Coaches

Pos.	No.	Name	Age – Date of birth	Height	Club	Ctr.
G	4	Alicia Poto	26 – 28 March 1978	1.66 m (5 ft 5 in)	Aix-en-Provence	(France)
G	5	Allison Tranquilli	31 – 12 September 1972	1.78 m (5 ft 10 in)	PVSK Pecs	(Hungary)
G	6	Sandy Brondello	35 – 20 August 1968	1.70 m (5 ft 7 in)	Ros Casares Valencia	(Spain)
F	7	Penny Taylor	23 – 24 May 1981	1.83 m (6 ft 0 in)	Phoenix Mercury	(United States)
C	8	Suzy Batkovic	23 – 17 December 1980	1.95 m (6 ft 5 in)	US Valenciennes	(France)
F	9	Trisha Fallon (C)	32 – 23 July 1972	1.90 m (6 ft 3 in)	Ros Casares Valencia	(Spain)
G	10	Kristi Harrower	29 – 4 March 1975	1.62 m (5 ft 4 in)	Aix-en-Provence	(France)
F	11	Laura Summerton	20 – 13 December 1983	1.89 m (6 ft 2 in)	Adelaide Lightning	(Australia)
G	12	Belinda Snell	23 – 10 January 1981	1.82 m (6 ft 0 in)	Sydney Uni Flames	(Australia)
F	13	Natalie Porter	23 – 16 December 1980	1.85 m (6 ft 1 in)	Townsville Fire	(Australia)
F	14	Rachael Sporn	36 – 26 May 1968	1.87 m (6 ft 2 in)	Adelaide Lightning	(Australia)
F	15	Lauren Jackson	23 – 11 May 1981	1.95 m (6 ft 5 in)	Seattle Storm	(United States)

Head coach

- (Australia) Jan Stirling

Assistant coach(es)

- (Australia) Karen Dalton
- (Australia) Chris Lucas

Legend

- (C) Team captain
- nat field describes country
  of last club
  before the tournament
- Age as of August 13, 2004

Group play

Pos	Team	Pld	W	L	PF	PA	PD	Pts	Qualification
1	Australia	5	5	0	418	313	+105	10	Quarterfinals
2	Russia	5	4	1	389	333	+56	9	Quarterfinals
3	Brazil	5	3	2	430	361	+69	8	Quarterfinals
4	Greece (H)	5	2	3	353	392	−39	7	Quarterfinals
5	Japan	5	1	4	381	485	−104	6	
6	Nigeria	5	0	5	335	422	−87	5	

Source: FIBA archive
Rules for classification: 1) points; 2) head-to-head points; 3) head-to-head goal average; 4) head-to-head number of points scored.
(H) Hosts

14 August 2004
9:00

Australia	85–73	Nigeria
Scoring by quarter: 20–18, 26–14, 16–12, 23–29
Pts: Batkovic, Taylor 11; Rebs: Batkovic 7 Asts: Fallon, Harrower 4		Pts: Udoka 26; Rebs: Amachree, Sadiq 8 Asts: Umoh 2

Helliniko Indoor Arena, Athens
Attendance: 302
Referees:
Philippe Leemann (France)
Valdu Suurkask (Estonia)

16 August 2004
22:15

Russia	56–75	Australia
Scoring by quarter: 12–21, 21–15, 15–16, 8–23
Pts: Korstin 12; Rebs: Korstin 9 Asts: Osipova, Rakhmatulina 3		Pts: Taylor 26; Rebs: Jackson, Taylor 10; Asts: Harrower 4

Olympic Indoor Hall, Athens
Attendance: 2,430
Referees:
Reynaldo Mercedes Sanchez (Dom. Republic)
Nancy Ethier (Canada)

18 August 2004
11:15

Japan	78–97	Australia
Scoring by quarter: 20–26, 15–30, 10–26, 33–15
Pts: Oga 21; Rebs: Yano 4 Asts: Kawabata, Tachikawa 2		Pts: Jackson 31; Rebs: Jackson 9 Asts: Tranquilli 5

Helliniko Indoor Arena, Athens
Attendance: 500
Referees:
Alejandro Chiti (Argentina)
Song Yanping (China)

20 August 2004
20:00

Australia	77–40	Greece
Scoring by quarter: 18–13, 21–8, 20–9, 18–10
Pts: Jackson 20; Rebs: Jackson 12; Asts: Batkovic 2		Pts: Maltsi 9 Rebs: Maltsi 10; Asts: Saregkou 3

Helliniko Indoor Arena, Athens
Attendance: 4,000
Referees:
Virginijus Dovidavicius (Lithuania)
Giampaolo Cicoria (Italy)

22 August 2004
14:30

Brazil	66–84	Australia
Scoring by quarter: 21–20, 14–20, 18–22, 13–22
Pts: Luz 16; Rebs: Oliveira 11; Asts: Castro Marques, Arcain 3		Pts: Jackson 24; Rebs: Snell 8 Asts: Fallon, Snell 3

Helliniko Indoor Arena, Athens
Attendance: 3,450
Referees:
Corbin Sean (United States)
Giampaolo Cicoria (Italy)

Quarterfinal

25 August 2004
22:15

Australia	94–55	New Zealand
Scoring by quarter: 26–13, 19–18, 26–13, 23–11
Pts: Jackson 28; Rebs: Snell 10; Asts: Taylor 4		Pts: G. Farmer 15; Rebs: Loffhagen 11; Asts: Four players 2

Olympic Indoor Hall, Athens
Attendance: 8,100
Referees:
Ma Li Jun (China)
Tatiana Steigerwald (Brazil)

Semifinal

27 August 2004
16:45

Brazil	75–88	Australia
Scoring by quarter: 21–21, 15–21, 20–21, 19–25
Pts: Castro Marques 25; Rebs: Oliveira 8 Asts: Luz 2		Pts: Jackson 26; Rebs: Jackson 13; Asts: Harrower 4

Olympic Indoor Hall, Athens
Attendance: 4,150
Referees:
Jorge Vazquez (Puerto Rico)
Virginijus Dovidavicius (Lithuania)

Gold Medal Final

28 August 2004
16:15

United States	74–63	Australia
Scoring by quarter: 17–14, 12–12, 23–24, 22–13
Pts: Thompson 18; Rebs: Leslie 8 Asts: Thompson 3		Pts: Taylor 16; Rebs: Jackson 14; Asts: Fallon, Jackson 2

Olympic Indoor Hall, Athens
Attendance: 10,120
Referees:
Chantal Julien (France)
José Reyes Ronfini (Mexico)

Won Silver Medal

== Boxing ==
Australia has qualified nine boxers for the Olympics based on their performances from the Oceanian Qualification Tournament.

Athlete	Event	Round of 32	Round of 16	Quarterfinals	Semifinals	Final	
Athlete	Event	Opposition Result	Opposition Result	Opposition Result	Opposition Result	Opposition Result	Rank
Peter Wakefield	Light flyweight	Bye	Jermia (NAM); L 20–29	Did not advance			
Bradley Hore	Flyweight	Siler (USA); L 18–32	Did not advance				
Joel Brunker	Bantamweight	Mammadov (AZE); L RSC	Did not advance				
Ryan Langham	Featherweight	Simion (ROM); L RSC	Did not advance				
Anthony Little	Lightweight	Chobba (TUN); W 27–8	Khrachev (RUS); L RSC	Did not advance			
Anoushirvan Nourian	Light welterweight	Julie (SEY); W 51–22	di Rocco (ITA); L 25–33	Did not advance			
Gerard O'Mahony	Welterweight	Polyakov (UKR); L 27–54	Did not advance				
Jamie Pittman	Middleweight	Wilaschek (GER); L 23–24	Did not advance				
Adam Forsyth	Heavyweight	—N/a	Đipalo (CRO); W 32–22	Elsayed (EGY); L 12–27	Did not advance		

== Canoeing ==
=== Slalom ===
Athlete	Event	Preliminary						Semifinal		Final			
Athlete	Event	Run 1	Rank	Run 2	Rank	Total	Rank	Time	Rank	Time	Rank	Total	Rank
Robin Bell	Men's C-1	100.11	4	112.57	13	212.68	12 Q	97.48	4 Q	95.35	2	192.83	4
Warwick Draper	Men's K-1	99.69	16	101.41	20	201.10	18 Q	97.03	10 Q	100.40	7	197.43	9
Mark Bellofiore; Lachie Milne	Men's C-2	114.07	8	164.29	12	278.36	12	Did not advance					
Louise Natoli	Women's K-1	115.83	8	111.38	=7	227.21	8 Q	113.24	9 Q	113.20	6	227.44	7

=== Sprint ===
Men

Athlete	Event	Heats		Semifinals		Final	
Athlete	Event	Time	Rank	Time	Rank	Time	Rank
Martin Marinov	C-1 500 m	1:49.698	2 q	1:51.219	4	Did not advance	
Nathan Baggaley	K-1 500 m	1:37.997	2 q	1:39.031	2 Q	1:38.467	2nd place, silver medalist(s)
Nathan Baggaley	K-1 1000 m	3:29.414	2 q	3:28.417	1 Q	3:28.310	4
Nathan Baggaley; Clint Robinson	K-2 500 m	1:30.869	4 q	1:30.710	2 Q	1:27.920	2nd place, silver medalist(s)
Daniel Collins; David Rhodes	K-2 1000 m	3:11.272	3 Q	Bye		3:19.956	4

Women

Athlete	Event	Heats		Semifinals		Final	
Athlete	Event	Time	Rank	Time	Rank	Time	Rank
Amanda Rankin	K-1 500 m	1:56.678	7 q	1:56.198	8	Did not advance	
Paula Harvey; Susan Tegg	K-2 500 m	1:46.319	7 q	1:51.402	9	Did not advance	
Kate Barclay; Chantal Meek; Lisa Oldenhof; Amanda Rankin	K-4 500 m	1:35.078	4 q	1:33.977	1 Q	1:38.116	6

Qualification Legend: Q = Qualify to final; q = Qualify to semifinal

== Cycling ==
=== Road ===
Men

Athlete	Event	Time	Rank
Baden Cooke	Road race	Did not finish	
Robbie McEwen	Road race	5:41:56	11
Stuart O'Grady	Road race	5:41:56	33
Michael Rogers	Road race	Did not finish	
Michael Rogers	Time trial	58:01.67	3rd place, bronze medalist(s)
Matt White	Road race	Did not finish	

Women

Athlete	Event	Time	Rank
Sara Carrigan	Road race	3:24:24	1st place, gold medalist(s)
Olivia Gollan	Road race	3:25:42	12
Oenone Wood	Road race	3:25:03	4
Oenone Wood	Time trial	32:16.00	6

=== Track ===
Sprint

Athlete	Event	Qualification		Round 1	Repechage 1	Round 2	Repechage 2	Quarterfinals	Semifinals	Final	
Athlete	Event	Time Speed (km/h)	Rank	Opposition Time Speed (km/h)	Opposition Time Speed (km/h)	Opposition Time Speed (km/h)	Opposition Time Speed (km/h)	Opposition Time Speed (km/h)	Opposition Time Speed (km/h)	Opposition Time Speed (km/h)	Rank
Ryan Bayley	Men's sprint	10.177; 70.477	1	Nimke (GER); W 10.510; 68.506	Bye	Ng (MAS); W 10.520; 68.441	Bye	Forde (BAR); W 10.733, W 10.807	Gané (FRA); W 10.546, W 10.638	Bos (NED); L, W 10.661, W 10.743	1st place, gold medalist(s)
Sean Eadie	Men's sprint	10.454; 68.873	9	Kwiatkowski (POL); W 11.025; 65.306	Bye	Bourgain (FRA); L	Edgar (GBR); Ng (MAS); L	Did not advance		9th place final Villanueva (ESP); Mulder (NED); Ng (MAS); L	12
Anna Meares	Women's sprint	11.291; 63.737	1	Radanova (BUL); W 11.927; 60.367	Bye	—N/a		Meinke (GER); W 11.916, W 12.048	Muenzer (CAN); W 11.802, L, L	Grankovskaya (RUS); W 12.042, W 11.822	3rd place, bronze medalist(s)
Ryan Bayley; Sean Eadie; Shane Kelly	Men's team sprint	44.512; 60.657	5 Q	Spain; W 44.320; 60.920	—N/a					France; L 44.404; 60.805	4

Pursuit

Athlete	Event	Qualification		Semifinals		Final	
Athlete	Event	Time	Rank	Opponent Results	Rank	Opponent Results	Rank
Bradley McGee	Men's individual pursuit	4:17.510	3 Q	Bartko (GER); 4:17.978	2 Q	Wiggins (GBR); 4:20.436	2nd place, silver medalist(s)
Luke Roberts	Men's individual pursuit	4:19.353	7 Q	Escobar (ESP); 4:20.336	5	Did not advance	
Katherine Bates	Women's individual pursuit	3:31.236	4 Q	Chalykh (RUS); 3:34.743	4 Q	van Moorsel (NED); 3:31.715	4
Katie Mactier	Women's individual pursuit	3:29.945	2 Q	Davies (GBR); 3:28.095	2 Q	Ulmer (NZL); 3:27.650	2nd place, silver medalist(s)
Graeme Brown; Peter Dawson*; Brett Lancaster; Bradley McGee; Luke Roberts; Stephen Wooldridge*	Men's team pursuit	4:00.613	1 Q	Lithuania; 3:56.610	1 Q	Great Britain; 3:58.233	1st place, gold medalist(s)

Time trial

Athlete	Event	Time	Rank
Shane Kelly	Men's time trial	1:01.224	4
Anna Meares	Women's time trial	33.952 WR	1st place, gold medalist(s)

Keirin

Athlete	Event	1st round	Repechage	2nd round	Final
Athlete	Event	Rank	Rank	Rank	Rank
Ryan Bayley	Men's keirin	1 Q	Bye	1 Q	1st place, gold medalist(s)
Shane Kelly	Men's keirin	1 Q	Bye	1 Q	3rd place, bronze medalist(s)

Omnium

Athlete	Event	Points	Laps	Rank
Mark Renshaw	Men's points race	20	2	6
Katherine Bates	Women's points race	7	0	8
Graeme Brown; Stuart O'Grady	Men's madison	22	0	1st place, gold medalist(s)

=== Mountain biking ===
Athlete	Event	Time	Rank
Joshua Fleming	Men's cross-country	2:29:54	31
Sid Taberlay	Men's cross-country	2:26:16	23
Lisa Mathison	Women's cross-country	2:07:01	10

== Diving ==
Men

Athlete	Events	Preliminaries		Semifinals		Final	
Athlete	Events	Points	Rank	Points	Rank	Points	Rank
Steven Barnett	3 m springboard	397.71	17 Q	614.76	16	Did not advance	
Robert Newbery	3 m springboard	429.09	10 Q	657.69	10 Q	620.34	12
Mathew Helm	10 m platform	513.06	1 Q	722.40	1 Q	730.56	2nd place, silver medalist(s)
Robert Newbery	10 m platform	461.91	7 Q	655.89	5 Q	640.65	8
Steven Barnett; Robert Newbery	3 m synchronized springboard	—N/a				349.59	3rd place, bronze medalist(s)
Mathew Helm; Robert Newbery	10 m synchronized platform	—N/a				366.84	3rd place, bronze medalist(s)

Women

Athlete	Events	Preliminaries		Semifinals		Final	
Athlete	Events	Points	Rank	Points	Rank	Points	Rank
Irina Lashko	3 m springboard	303.66	8 Q	550.17	4 Q	551.97	7
Loudy Tourky	3 m springboard	310.65	5 Q	538.44	6 Q	566.94	6
Chantelle Newbery	10 m platform	346.95	6 Q	545.25	3 Q	590.31	1st place, gold medalist(s)
Loudy Tourky	10 m platform	367.23	2 Q	560.10	1 Q	561.66	3rd place, bronze medalist(s)
Irina Lashko; Chantelle Newbery	3 m synchronized springboard	—N/a				309.30	3rd place, bronze medalist(s)
Lynda Folauhola; Loudy Tourky	10 m synchronized platform	—N/a				313.92	4

== Equestrian ==
=== Dressage ===
Athlete	Horse	Event	Grand Prix		Grand Prix Special		Grand Prix Freestyle		Overall	
Athlete	Horse	Event	Score	Rank	Score	Rank	Score	Rank	Score	Rank
Mary Hanna	Limbo	Individual	65.500	39	Did not advance					
Ricky MacMillan	Crisp	Individual	65.917	37	Did not advance					

=== Eventing ===
Athlete	Horse	Event	Dressage		Cross-country			Jumping						Total	
Athlete	Horse	Event	Dressage		Cross-country			Qualifier			Final			Total	
Athlete	Horse	Event	Penalties	Rank	Penalties	Total	Rank	Penalties	Total	Rank	Penalties	Total	Rank	Penalties	Rank
Olivia Bunn	Top of the Line	Individual	45.20	=17	1.20	46.40	15	Retired			Did not advance				
Phillip Dutton	Nova Top	Individual	46.80 #	22	0.00	46.80	16	4.00	50.80	10 Q	12.00	62.80	13	62.80	13
Andrew Hoy	Mr Pracatan	Individual	43.60	=12	75.80 #	119.40 #	62	16.00	135.40 #	57	Did not advance			135.40	57
Rebel Morrow	Oaklea Groover	Individual	40.60	8	1.60 #	42.20	7	8.00	50.20	9 Q	10.00	60.20	11	60.20	11
Stuart Tinney	Jeepster	Individual	48.80 #	28	0.00	48.80 #	19	36.00 #	84.80	38	Did not advance			84.80	38
Olivia Bunn; Phillip Dutton; Andrew Hoy; Rebel Morrow; Stuart Tinney	See above	Team	129.40	5	1.20	135.40	=3	28.00	185.80	10	—N/a			185.80	6

"#" indicates that the score of this rider does not count in the team competition, since only the best three results of a team are counted.

=== Show jumping ===
Athlete	Horse	Event	Qualification								Final					Total	
Athlete	Horse	Event	Round 1		Round 2			Round 3			Round A		Round B			Total	
Athlete	Horse	Event	Penalties	Rank	Penalties	Total	Rank	Penalties	Total	Rank	Penalties	Rank	Penalties	Total	Rank	Penalties	Rank
Tim Amitrano	Mr Innocent	Individual	38	75	48	86	71	Retired			Did not advance						

== Fencing ==
Men

Athlete	Event	Round of 64	Round of 32	Round of 16	Quarterfinal	Semifinal	Final / BM	
Athlete	Event	Opposition Score	Opposition Score	Opposition Score	Opposition Score	Opposition Score	Opposition Score	Rank
Seamus Robinson	Individual épée	Bye	Kolobkov (RUS); L 5–15	Did not advance				
Frank Bartolillo	Individual foil	Bye	Wu Hx (CHN); L 8–15	Did not advance				

Women

Athlete	Event	Round of 64	Round of 32	Round of 16	Quarterfinal	Semifinal	Final / BM	
Athlete	Event	Opposition Score	Opposition Score	Opposition Score	Opposition Score	Opposition Score	Opposition Score	Rank
Evelyn Halls	Individual épée	Bye	Lee G-N (KOR); W 15–14	Nisima (FRA); L 10–15	Did not advance			

== Field hockey ==
Australia qualified a men's and a women's team. Each team had 16 athletes with two reserves.

=== Men's tournament ===
Roster

The following is the Australian roster in the men's field hockey tournament of the 2004 Summer Olympics.

Head coach: Barry Dancer

1. Jamie Dwyer
2. Liam de Young
4. Michael McCann
5. Troy Elder
6. Robert Hammond
7. Nathan Eglington
9. Mark Knowles
13. Michael Brennan
14. Grant Schubert
15. Bevan George
19. Mark Hickman (GK)
23. Matthew Wells
24. Travis Brooks
25. Brent Livermore
26. Dean Butler
30. Stephen Mowlam (GK)

Group play

Pos	Team	Pld	W	D	L	GF	GA	GD	Pts	Qualification
1	Netherlands	5	5	0	0	16	9	+7	15	Semi-finals
2	Australia	5	3	1	1	14	10	+4	10	Semi-finals
3	New Zealand	5	3	0	2	13	11	+2	9	5–8th place semi-finals
4	India	5	1	1	3	11	13	−2	4	5–8th place semi-finals
5	South Africa	5	1	0	4	9	15	−6	3	9–12th place semi-finals
6	Argentina	5	0	2	3	8	13	−5	2	9–12th place semi-finals

Source: FIH

15 August 2004
08:30

Australia	4 – 1	New Zealand
Elder 15'; Dwyer 24', 42', 60'	Report	Smith 58'

Umpires:
David Leiper (GBR)
Amarjit Singh (MAS)

17 August 2004
10:30

Argentina	2 – 2	Australia
Almada 2', 31'	Report	Dwyer 26', 66'

Umpires:
Christian Blasch (GER)
Jason McCracken (NZL)

19 August 2004
20:30

Australia	4 – 3	India
Elder 11'; Dwyer 38'; McCann 49'; Brennan 70'	Report	Thakur 6'; G. A. Singh 50'; Halappa 52'

Umpires:
Henrik Ehlers (DEN)
John Wright (RSA)

21 August 2004
18:00

South Africa	2 – 3	Australia
Nicol 4'; Smith 29'	Report	Brooks 17'; Eglington 19'; Brennan 47'

Umpires:
Henrik Ehlers (DEN)
Satinder Kumar (IND)

23 August 2004
20:30

Australia	1 – 2	Netherlands
Brooks 28'	Report	Taekema 10', 13'

Umpires:
Xavier Adell (ESP)
Amarjit Singh (MAS)

Semifinals

25 August 2004
21:00

Spain	3 – 6	Australia
Tubau 8'; Ribas 49', 67'	Report	Elder 3'; McCann 23', 44'; Wells 27'; Schubert 51', 53'

Umpires:
John Wright (RSA)
Henrik Ehlers (DEN)

Gold Medal Final

27 August 2004
20:30

Netherlands	1 – 2 (a.e.t.)	Australia
Brouwer 29'	Report	Brooks 37'; Dwyer 78'

Umpires:
Ray O'Connor (IRL)
John Wright (RSA)

Won Gold Medal

=== Women's tournament ===
Roster

The following is the Australian roster in the women's field hockey tournament of the 2004 Summer Olympics.

Head coach: David Bell

1. Toni Cronk (GK)
2. Louise Dobson
3. Karen Smith
7. Peta Gallagher
10. Bianca Netzler
11. Emily Halliday
14. Nicole Arrold
17. Rachel Imison (GK)
20. Carmel Bakurski
22. Katie Allen
24. Angie Skirving
25. Melanie Twitt
27. Suzie Faulkner
28. Julie Towers
31. Katrina Powell (C)
32. Nikki Hudson

Group play

Pos	Team	Pld	W	D	L	GF	GA	GD	Pts	Qualification
1	Netherlands	4	4	0	0	14	5	+9	12	Semi-finals
2	Germany	4	2	0	2	6	10	−4	6	Semi-finals
3	South Korea	4	1	1	2	9	8	+1	4	
4	Australia	4	1	1	2	6	5	+1	4	
5	South Africa	4	1	0	3	5	12	−7	3	

Source: FIH
Rules for classification: 1) Points; 2) Matches won; 3) Goal difference; 4) Goals for; 5) Head-to-head result.

14 August 2004
18:00

Australia	1 – 2	Germany
Towers 58'	Report	Ernsting-Krienke 21'; Müller 34'

Umpires:
Soledad Iparraguirre (ARG)
Chieko Akiyama (JPN)

16 August 2004
10:30

South Africa	0 – 3	Australia
	Report	Towers 28'; Faulkner 34'; Gallagher 59'

Umpires:
Sarah Garnett (NZL)
Ute Conen (GER)

20 August 2004
08:30

South Korea	2 – 2	Australia
Park Mi-Hyun 31'; Kim Seong-Eun 46'	Report	Dobson 6'; Powell 43'

Umpires:
Soledad Iparraguirre (ARG)
Marelize de Klerk (RSA)

22 August 2004
20:00

Australia	0 – 1	Netherlands
	Report	Donners 47'

Umpires:
Marelize de Klerk (RSA)
Gina Spitaleri (ITA)

Fifth-Eighth Place Semifinal

24 August 2004
11:00

Japan	1 – 3	Australia
Komori 15'	Report	Gallagher 27'; Faulkner 33'; Powell 37'

Umpires:
Sarah Garnett (NZL)
Carolina de la Fuente (ARG)

Fifth Place Final

27 August 2004
11:00

New Zealand	0 – 3	Australia
	Report	Towers 14'; Powell 42', 67'

Umpires:
Chieko Akiyama (JPN)
Gina Spitaleri (ITA)

== Football ==
=== Men's tournament ===
Roster

The following is the Australian squad in the men's football tournament of the 2004 Summer Olympics.

Head coach: Frank Farina

No.	Pos.	Player	Date of birth (age)	Caps	Goals	2004 club
1	GK	Brad Jones	19 March 1982 (aged 22)	4	0	(The Football Association) Middlesbrough
2	DF	Jade North	7 January 1982 (aged 22)	38	5	(Football Australia) Perth Glory
3	DF	Shane Cansdell-Sherriff	10 November 1982 (aged 21)	21	4	(Danish Football Association) Aarhus GF
4	DF	Craig Moore*	12 December 1975 (aged 28)	60	3	(Scottish Football Association) Rangers
5	MF	Jon McKain	21 September 1982 (aged 21)	16	2	(Romanian Football Federation) FC National Bucharest
6	DF	Adrian Madaschi	11 July 1982 (aged 22)	19	3	(Scottish Football Association) Partick Thistle
7	MF	Ahmad Elrich	30 May 1981 (aged 23)	35	7	(Football Australia) Parramatta Power
8	MF	Luke Wilkshire	2 October 1981 (aged 22)	22	5	(The Football Association) Bristol City
9	FW	John Aloisi*	5 February 1976 (aged 28)	38	18	(Royal Spanish Football Federation) Osasuna
10	MF	Tim Cahill*	6 December 1979 (aged 24)	4	6	(The Football Association) Millwall
11	FW	Alex Brosque	12 October 1983 (aged 20)	22	5	(Football Australia) Marconi Stallions
12	DF	David Tarka	11 February 1983 (aged 21)	19	1	(The Football Association) Nottingham Forest
13	MF	Carl Valeri	14 August 1984 (aged 19)	34	3	(Italian Football Federation) Inter Milan
14	FW	Brett Holman	27 March 1984 (aged 20)	18	7	(Royal Dutch Football Association) Excelsior Rotterdam
15	MF	Anthony Danze	15 March 1984 (aged 20)	21	8	(Football Australia) Perth Glory
16	MF	Spase Dilevski	13 May 1985 (aged 19)	25	2	(The Football Association) Tottenham Hotspur
17	MF	Ryan Griffiths	21 August 1981 (aged 22)	8	2	(Football Australia) Newcastle United Jets
18	GK	Eugene Galeković	12 June 1981 (aged 23)	6	0	(Football Australia) South Melbourne FC

* Over-aged player.

Group play

Pos	Team	Pld	W	D	L	GF	GA	GD	Pts	Qualification
1	Argentina	3	3	0	0	9	0	+9	9	Qualified for the quarterfinals
2	Australia	3	1	1	1	6	3	+3	4	Qualified for the quarterfinals
3	Tunisia	3	1	1	1	4	5	−1	4	
4	Serbia and Montenegro	3	0	0	3	3	14	−11	0	

11 August 2004
20:30

Tunisia	1 – 1	Australia
Zitouni 69'	Report	Aloisi 45'

Pankritio Stadium, Heraklion
Attendance: 15,757
Referee: Kyros Vassaras (Greece)

14 August 2004
20:30

Serbia and Montenegro	1 – 5	Australia
Radonjić 72'	Report	Cahill 11'; Aloisi 45+1', 57'; Elrich 60', 86'

Pankritio Stadium, Heraklion
Attendance: 8,857
Referee: Subkhiddin Mohd Salleh (Malaysia)

17 August 2004
20:30

Argentina	1 – 0	Australia
D'Alessandro 9'	Report

Karaiskakis Stadium, Piraeus
Attendance: 26,338
Referee: Essam Abd El Fatah (Egypt)

Quarterfinal

21 August 2004
18:00

Iraq	1 – 0	Australia
E. Mohammed 64'	Report

Pankritio Stadium, Heraklion
Attendance: 10,023
Referee: Carlos Batres (Guatemala)

=== Women's tournament ===
Roster

Head coach: Adrian Santrac

Australia named a squad of 18 players and 3 alternates for the tournament.

No.	Pos.	Player	Date of birth (age)	Caps	Goals	Club
1	GK	Cassandra Kell	20 January 1980 (aged 24)	19	0	(Football Australia) New South Wales Sapphires
2	DF	Rhian Davies	5 January 1981 (aged 23)	33	2	(Football Australia) Canberra Eclipse
3	DF	Sacha Wainwright	6 February 1972 (aged 32)	61	2	(Football Australia) Canberra Eclipse
4	DF	Dianne Alagich	12 May 1979 (aged 25)	50	3	(Football Australia) Adelaide Sensation
5	DF	Cheryl Salisbury (captain)	8 March 1974 (aged 30)	18	4	(United States Soccer Federation) New York Power
6	MF	Sally Shipard	20 October 1987 (aged 16)	1	0	(Football Australia) New South Wales Sapphires
7	FW	Sarah Walsh	11 January 1983 (aged 21)	7	4	(Football Australia) Queensland Sting
8	MF	Heather Garriock	21 December 1982 (aged 21)	49	8	(Football Australia) Queensland Sting
9	MF	Kylie Ledbrook	20 March 1986 (aged 18)	4	0	(Football Australia) New South Wales Sapphires
10	MF	Joanne Peters	11 March 1979 (aged 25)	64	15	(United States Soccer Federation) New York Power
11	FW	Lisa De Vanna	14 November 1984 (aged 19)	6	3	(Football Australia) Adelaide Sensation
12	DF	Karla Reuter	14 June 1984 (aged 20)	13	0	(Football Australia) Queensland Sting
13	DF	Thea Slatyer	2 February 1983 (aged 21)	15	1	(Football Australia) New South Wales Sapphires
14	MF	Gillian Foster	28 August 1976 (aged 27)	32	1	(Football Australia) Canberra Eclipse
15	MF	Tal Karp	30 December 1981 (aged 22)	27	2	(Football Australia) Canberra Eclipse
16	FW	Selin Kuralay	25 January 1985 (aged 19)	7	1	(Football Australia) Victoria Vision
17	MF	Danielle Small	7 February 1979 (aged 25)	28	6	(Football Australia) New South Wales Sapphires
18	GK	Melissa Barbieri	8 August 1980 (aged 24)	16	0	(Football Australia) Victoria Vision

Group play

Pos	Team	Pld	W	D	L	GF	GA	GD	Pts	Qualification
1	United States	3	2	1	0	6	1	+5	7	Qualified for the quarterfinals
2	Brazil	3	2	0	1	8	2	+6	6	Qualified for the quarterfinals
3	Australia	3	1	1	1	2	2	0	4	Qualified for the quarterfinals
4	Greece	3	0	0	3	0	11	−11	0	

11 August 2004
18:00

Brazil	1 – 0	Australia
Marta 36'	Report

Kaftanzoglio Stadium, Thessaloniki
Attendance: 25.152
Referee: Damková (Czech Republic)

14 August 2004
20:30

Greece	0 – 1	Australia
	Report	Garriock 27'

Pankritio Stadium, Heraklion
Attendance: 8.857
Referee: D'Coth (India)

17 August 2004
20:30

United States	1 – 1	Australia
Lilly 19'	Report	Peters 82'

Kaftanzoglio Stadium, Thessaloniki
Attendance: 3.320
Referee: Ionescu (Romania)

Quarterfinal

20 August 2004
21:00

Sweden	2 – 1	Australia
Ljungberg 25'; Larsson 30'	Report	De Vanna 48'

Panthessaliko Stadium, Volos
Attendance: 4.811
Referee: Damková (Czech Republic)

== Gymnastics ==
=== Artistic ===
Australia qualified a women's team and an individual man.

Men

Athlete	Event	Qualification								Final							
Athlete	Event	Apparatus						Total	Rank	Apparatus						Total	Rank
Athlete	Event	F	PH	R	V	PB	HB	Total	Rank	F	PH	R	V	PB	HB	Total	Rank
Philippe Rizzo	Pommel horse	—N/a	8.700	—N/a				8.700	70	Did not advance							
Philippe Rizzo	Parallel bars	—N/a				9.700	—N/a	9.700	12	Did not advance							
Philippe Rizzo	Parallel bars	—N/a					8.950	8.950	66	Did not advance							

Women
Team

Athlete	Event	Qualification						Final					
Athlete	Event	Apparatus				Total	Rank	Apparatus				Total	Rank
Athlete	Event	V	UB	BB	F	Total	Rank	V	UB	BB	F	Total	Rank
Stephanie Moorhouse	Team	8.875	9.337	9.162	8.850	36.224	30 q	—N/a		9.187	9.037	—N/a	
Melissa Munro	Team	9.225	—N/a	9.312	9.187	—N/a		9.162	—N/a	9.150	8.912	—N/a	
Karen Nguyen	Team	9.087	9.300	—N/a	8.725	—N/a		9.112	—N/a				
Monette Russo	Team	9.050	9.437	8.887	9.062	34.436	25 Q*	—N/a	8.125	—N/a			
Lisa Skinner	Team	—N/a	9.387	8.700	—N/a			—N/a	9.425	—N/a			
Allana Slater	Team	9.212	8.775	9.587 Q	9.337	37.011	17 Q	9.175	9.550	8.637	9.375	—N/a	
Total	Team	58.625	59.450	58.325	59.050	235.450	5 Q	27.449	27.100	26.974	27.324	108.847	8

* Monette Russo supposedly qualified for the all-around final, but later withdrew because of injury.

Individual finals

Athlete	Event	Apparatus				Total	Rank
Athlete	Event	V	UB	BB	F	Total	Rank
Stephanie Moorhouse	All-around	9.037	8.587	8.200	8.925	35.723	20
Allana Slater	All-around	9.175	9.362	9.212	9.350	37.099	10
Allana Slater	Balance beam	—N/a		8.750	—N/a	8.750	8

=== Rhythmic ===
Athlete	Event	Qualification						Final					
Athlete	Event	Rope	Hoop	Clubs	Ribbon	Total	Rank	Rope	Hoop	Clubs	Ribbon	Total	Rank
Penelope Blackmore	Individual	19.575	19.325	19.600	14.550	73.050	23	Did not advance					

=== Trampoline ===
Athlete	Event	Qualification		Final	
Athlete	Event	Score	Rank	Score	Rank
Lesley Daly	Women's	58.90	13	Did not advance	

== Judo ==
Australia has qualified a total of twelve judoka (seven men and five women) for the Games.

Men

Athlete	Event	Round of 32	Round of 16	Quarterfinals	Semifinals	Repechage 1	Repechage 2	Repechage 3	Final / BM	
Athlete	Event	Opposition Result	Opposition Result	Opposition Result	Opposition Result	Opposition Result	Opposition Result	Opposition Result	Opposition Result	Rank
Scott Fernandis	−60 kg	Fallon (GBR); L 0000–1000	Did not advance							
Heath Young	−66 kg	Paz (BOL); W 0103–0000	Arencibia (CUB); L 0001–1001	Did not advance		Ortíz (VEN); L 0000–1000	Did not advance			
Andrew Collett	−73 kg	Wiłkomirski (POL); L 0001–1001	Did not advance							
Morgan Endicott-Davies	−81 kg	Iliadis (GRE); L 0000–1002	Did not advance			Sganga (ARG); W 1000–0000	Kwon Y-W (KOR); L 0000–1001	Did not advance		
Daniel Kelly	−90 kg	Gordon (GBR); L 0000–1100	Did not advance			Geraldino (DOM); W 1010–0000	Honorato (BRA); W 0011–0010	Taov (RUS); L 0001–0100	Did not advance	
Martin Kelly	−100 kg	Jackman (BAR); W 1101–0010	Inoue (JPN); L 0000–1000	Did not advance						
Semir Pepic	+100 kg	Camacho (COL); W 1000–0000	Boonzaayer (USA); W 1010–0000	Miran (IRI); L 0100–0110	Did not advance	Bye	Tataroğlu (TUR); L 0010–0110	Did not advance		

Women

Athlete	Event	Round of 32	Round of 16	Quarterfinals	Semifinals	Repechage 1	Repechage 2	Repechage 3	Final / BM	
Athlete	Event	Opposition Result	Opposition Result	Opposition Result	Opposition Result	Opposition Result	Opposition Result	Opposition Result	Opposition Result	Rank
Sonya Chervonsky	−48 kg	Jossinet (FRA); L 0000–0200	Did not advance			Moskvina (BLR); L 0000–1000	Did not advance			
Maria Pekli	−57 kg	Göldi (SUI); L 0000–1000	Did not advance							
Carly Dixon	−63 kg	Bye	Décosse (FRA); L 0000–1010	Did not advance						
Catherine Arlove	−70 kg	Bye	Pažoutová (CZE); W 0100–0001	Kim R-M (PRK); W 0100–0010	Ueno (JPN); L 0010–0100	Bye			Qin Dy (CHN); L 0001–1010	5
Jessica Malone	+78 kg	Bye	Tsukada (JPN); L 0000–1000	Did not advance		Bye	Prokofyeva (UKR); L 0000–1000	Did not advance		

== Modern pentathlon ==
Based on the results from the 2003 Asian/Oceanian Championships, 1996 Olympic champion Alexander Parygin and Eszter Hortobagyi have qualified for modern pentathlon events in Athens. Parygin also previously competed for Kazakhstan.

Athlete	Event	Shooting (10 m air pistol)			Fencing (épée one touch)			Swimming (200 m freestyle)			Riding (show jumping)			Running (3000 m)			Total points	Final rank
Athlete	Event	Points	Rank	MP Points	Results	Rank	MP points	Time	Rank	MP points	Penalties	Rank	MP points	Time	Rank	MP Points	Total points	Final rank
Alexander Parygin	Men's	169	28	964	13–18	=23	748	2:14.14	28	1192	196	26	1004	10:01.57	17	996	4904	27
Eszter Hortobagyi	Women's	169	18	964	11–20	=29	692	2:29.42	26	1128	56	5	1144	11:11.44	11	1036	4964	20

== Rowing ==
Men

Athlete	Event	Heats		Repechage		Semifinals		Final	
Athlete	Event	Time	Rank	Time	Rank	Time	Rank	Time	Rank
Craig Jones	Single sculls	7:19.71	2 R	7:06.13	1 SA/B/C	7:05.66	4 FB	6:58.48	11
Drew Ginn; James Tomkins	Pair	6:55.04	1 SA/B	Bye		6:22.60	1 FA	6:30.76	1st place, gold medalist(s)
Peter Hardcastle; Brendan Long	Double sculls	6:52.34	3 SA/B	Bye		6:22.69	6 FB	6:22.57	12
George Jelbart; Cameron Wurf	Lightweight double sculls	6:28.94	4 R	6:26.10	3 SC/D	6:27.68	1 FC	6:51.32	16
David Dennis; Rob Jahrling; Tom Laurich; David McGowan	Four	6:21.97	1 SA/B	Bye		5:51.81	2 FA	6:13.06	4
Scott Brennan; David Crawshay; Shaun Coulton; Duncan Free	Quadruple sculls	5:46.32	3 SA/B	Bye		5:45.45	4 FB	6:02.31	7
Simon Burgess; Ben Cureton; Anthony Edwards; Glen Loftus	Lightweight four	5:50.24	1 SA/B	Bye		5:55.22	2 FA	5:57.43	2nd place, silver medalist(s)
Boden Hanson; Mike McKay; Stuart Reside; James Stewart; Geoff Stewart; Stephen Stewart; Stefan Szczurowski; Michael Toon (cox); Stuart Welch	Eight	5:23.23	1 FA	Bye		—N/a		5:45.38	3rd place, bronze medalist(s)

Women

Athlete	Event	Heats		Repechage		Semifinals		Final	
Athlete	Event	Time	Rank	Time	Rank	Time	Rank	Time	Rank
Donna Martin; Jane Robinson	Double sculls	7:41.20	4 R	7:04.69	3 FB	—N/a		6:55.17	9
Amber Halliday; Sally Newmarch	Lightweight double sculls	6:49.90 WR	1 SA/B	Bye		6:54.01	1 FA	6:59.91	4
Amber Bradley; Dana Faletic; Kerry Hore; Rebecca Sattin	Quadruple sculls	6:23.46	3 R	6:24.67	3 FA	—N/a		6:34.73	3rd place, bronze medalist(s)
Kyeema Doyle; Katie Foulkes (cox); Monique Heinke; Catriona Oliver; Sarah Outhwaite; Sally Robbins; Victoria Roberts; Jodi Winter; Julia Wilson	Eight	6:02.77	4 R	6:09.64	3 FA	—N/a		6:31.65	6

Qualification Legend: FA=Final A (medal); FB=Final B (non-medal); FC=Final C (non-medal); FD=Final D (non-medal); FE=Final E (non-medal); FF=Final F (non-medal); SA/B=Semifinals A/B; SC/D=Semifinals C/D; SE/F=Semifinals E/F; R=Repechage

== Sailing ==
Men

Athlete	Event	Race											Net points	Final rank
Athlete	Event	1	2	3	4	5	6	7	8	9	10	M*	Net points	Final rank
Lars Kleppich	Mistral	9	12	10	4	13	2	8	6	6	~~31~~	14	84	8
Anthony Nossiter	Finn	18	8	4	7	8	13	1	8	20	6	~~25~~	93	6
Malcolm Page; Nathan Wilmot	470	12	~~DSQ~~	3	3	19	3	4	18	3	26	OCS	119	12
Colin Beashel; David Giles	Star	9	7	~~OCS~~	5	4	13	11	16	14	6	13	98	15

Women

Athlete	Event	Race											Net points	Final rank
Athlete	Event	1	2	3	4	5	6	7	8	9	10	M*	Net points	Final rank
Jessica Crisp	Mistral	4	11	~~13~~	5	7	6	7	7	9	5	13	74	6
Sarah Blanck	Europe	3	7	2	11	9	2	13	8	12	8	~~24~~	75	4
Jenny Armstrong; Belinda Stowell	470	14	12	6	14	11	11	10	8	13	9	~~19~~	108	14
Nicky Bethwaite; Karyn Gojnich; Kristen Kosmala	Yngling	11	11	12	10	8	~~16~~	5	2	13	10	10	92	13

Open

Athlete	Event	Race																Net points	Final rank
Athlete	Event	1	2	3	4	5	6	7	8	9	10	11	12	13	14	15	M*	Net points	Final rank
Michael Blackburn	Laser	18	2	10	19	5	6	2	20	13	17	—N/a					~~32~~	112	9
Gary Boyd; Chris Nicholson	49er	13	6	15	1	17	~~18~~	10	1	7	3	1	17	2	1	~~20~~	11	105	7
Darren Bundock; John Forbes	Tornado	9	7	12	11	1	2	3	4	12	1	—N/a					~~14~~	62	6

M = Medal race; OCS = On course side of the starting line; DSQ = Disqualified; DNF = Did not finish; DNS= Did not start; RDG = Redress given

== Shooting ==
Men

Athlete	Event	Qualification		Final	
Athlete	Event	Points	Rank	Points	Rank
George Barton	Skeet	118	=29	Did not advance	
Michael Diamond	Trap	119	8	Did not advance	
Steve Haberman	Double trap	129	15	Did not advance	
Matthew Inabinet	10 m air rifle	584	=41	Did not advance	
Timothy Lowndes	10 m air rifle	587	=35	Did not advance	
Timothy Lowndes	50 m rifle prone	592	=16	Did not advance	
Timothy Lowndes	50 m rifle 3 positions	1161	=12	Did not advance	
David Moore	10 m air pistol	574	27	Did not advance	
David Moore	50 m pistol	550	=24	Did not advance	
Warren Potent	50 m rifle prone	586	=42	Did not advance	
Bruce Quick	25 m rapid fire pistol	571	17	Did not advance	
Paul Rahman	Skeet	120	=15	Did not advance	
Daniel Repacholi	10 m air pistol	571	=36	Did not advance	
Daniel Repacholi	50 m pistol	551	23	Did not advance	
Thomas Turner	Double trap	126	=19	Did not advance	
Adam Vella	Trap	121	5 Q	145	3rd place, bronze medalist(s)
Bryan Wilson	10 m running target	544	19	Did not advance	

Women

Athlete	Event	Qualification		Final	
Athlete	Event	Points	Rank	Points	Rank
Suzanne Balogh	Trap	66	1 Q	88	1st place, gold medalist(s)
Suzanne Balogh	Double trap	97	=13	Did not advance	
Kim Frazer	50 m rifle 3 positions	555	=32	Did not advance	
Lauryn Mark	Skeet	69	4 Q	92	4
Sue McCready	10 m air rifle	391	=27	Did not advance	
Sue McCready	50 m rifle 3 positions	567	=25	Did not advance	
Linda Ryan	10 m air pistol	376	=28	Did not advance	
Susan Trindall	Double trap	106	=7	Did not advance	
Annette Woodward	25 m pistol	576	18	Did not advance	
Lalita Yauhleuskaya	10 m air pistol	379	=21	Did not advance	
Lalita Yauhleuskaya	25 m pistol	578	=10	Did not advance	

== Softball ==
Team Roster

Position	No.	Player	Birth	Club in 2004
C	3	Marissa Carpadios	DEC/30/1977	Brisbane Panthers (East Brisbane, Queensland)
P	5	Melanie Roche	NOV/09/1970	Miki House (Yao, Osaka, JPN)
IF	6	Natalie Ward	DEC/24/1975
P	7	Tanya Harding	JAN/23/1972	Queensland Academy of Sport Heatwave (Brisbane, Queensland)
OF	8	Sandra Allen	OCT/11/1978
P	9	Tracey Mosley	SEP/25/1973	West Torrens (Adelaide, South Australia)
P	10	Brooke Wilkins	JUN/06/1974	Brisbane Panthers (East Brisbane, Queensland)
IF	11	Peta Edebone	FEB/09/1969	Rebels Softball Club
P	14	Kerry Wyborn	DEC/22/1977	Cumberland Nepean (Sydney, NSW)
IF	16	Stacey Porter	MAR/29/1982	University of Hawaii (Hawaii, USA)
IF	21	Natalie Titcume	DEC/06/1975	Hills Missiles (Sydney, NSW)
IF	25	Fiona Crawford	FEB/21/1977	Hills Missiles (Sydney, NSW)
OF	26	Simmone Morrow	OCT/31/1976	Bears (Brisbane, Queensland)
OF	27	Natalie Hodgskin	MAY/24/1976	Bears (Brisbane, Queensland)
IF	28	Amanda Doman	OCT/24/1977	Brisbane Panthers (East Brisbane, Queensland)
Bench Coaches
Team; Manager		Simon Roskvist	AUG/07/1958
Coach		Lloyd Howlett	JAN/17/1948
Coach		Kere Johanson	DEC/07/1964
Coach		Terry Downes	DEC/09/1972

Preliminary Round

Team	Pld	W	L	RF	RA	Pct
United States	7	7	0	41	0	1.000
Australia	7	6	1	22	14	0.857
Japan	7	4	3	17	8	0.571
China	7	3	4	15	20	0.429
Canada	7	3	4	6	14	0.429
Chinese Taipei	7	2	5	3	13	0.286
Greece	7	2	5	6	24	0.286
Italy	7	1	6	8	24	0.143

14 August

Team	1	2	3	4	5	6	7	R	H	E
Australia	0	1	0	2	1	0	0	4	7	0
Japan	2	0	0	8	0	0	0	2	0	2
W: Tanya Harding (1-0) L: Yukiko Ueno (0-1)
Home Run
AUS 1 : N.Titcume in 4th, 1 RBI

15 August

Team	1	2	3	4	5	R	H	E
Australia	0	0	0	0	0	0	1	0
United States	2	0	0	8	X	10	9	2
Game ended by Run Ahead Rule
W: Lisa Fernandez (1-0) L: Brooke Wilkins (0-1)
Home Run
USA 1 : S.Nuveman in 4th, 3 RBI

16 August

Team	1	2	3	4	5	6	7	R	H	E
Chinese Taipei	0	0	0	0	0	0	0	0	2	0
Australia	0	0	0	1	0	0	X	1	4	0
W: Wu Chia-Yen (0-2) L: Tanya Harding (2-0)
Home Run
none

17 August

Team	1	2	3	4	5	R	H	E
Australia	2	2	2	0	2	8	10	1
Italy	0	0	0	0	0	0	2	1
Game end by Run Ahead Rule
W: Melanie Roche (1-0) L: Jennifer Spediacci (0-1)
Home Run
AUS 2 : S.Porter in 1st, 2 RBI;N.Titcume in 5th, 2 RBI

18 August

Team	1	2	3	4	5	6	7	8	R	H	E
Australia	0	0	0	0	0	0	0	5	5	4	0
China	0	0	0	0	0	0	0	0	0	1	2
W: Melanie Roche (2-0) L: Lu Wei (1-1)
Home Run
none

19 August

Team	1	2	3	4	5	6	7	R	H	E
Australia	0	1	0	0	0	0	0	1	4	0
Canada	0	0	0	0	0	0	0	0	5	0
W: Melanie Roche (3-0) L: Lauren Bay (2-2)
Home Run
none

20 August

Team	1	2	3	4	5	6	7	R	H	E
Greece	2	0	0	0	0	0	0	2	4	2
Australia	0	0	1	2	0	0	X	3	7	1
W: Tanya Harding (3-0) L: Sarah Farnworth (2-4)
Home Run
AUS 2 : T.Mosley in 4th, 2 RBI;S.Porter in 3rd, 1 RBI

Semifinal, 22 August

Team	1	2	3	4	5	6	7	R	H	E
Australia	0	0	0	0	0	0	0	0	3	0
United States	0	0	0	1	3	1	x	5	8	0
W: Lisa Fernandez (3-0) L: Melanie Roche (3-1)
Home Run
USA: K. Kretschman in 6th, 1 RBI

Bronze Medal Game, 22 August

Team	1	2	3	4	5	6	7	R	H	E
Australia	0	0	0	0	3	0	0	3	4	0
Japan	0	0	0	0	0	0	0	0	3	1
W: Tanya Harding (4-0) L: Juri Takayama (1-2)
Home Run
none

Won Silver Medal

== Swimming ==
Australian swimmers earned qualifying standards in the following events (up to a maximum of 2 swimmers in each event at the A-standard time, and 1 at the B-standard time):

Men

Athlete	Event	Heat		Semifinal		Final	
Athlete	Event	Time	Rank	Time	Rank	Time	Rank
Ashley Callus	50 m freestyle	22.82	26	Did not advance			
Ashley Callus	100 m freestyle	50.56	31	Did not advance			
Grant Hackett	200 m freestyle	1:48.90	7 Q	1:47.61	5 Q	1:46.56	5
Grant Hackett	400 m freestyle	3:46.36	1 Q	—N/a		3:43.43	2nd place, silver medalist(s)
Grant Hackett	1500 m freestyle	15:01.89	3 Q	—N/a		14:43.40 OR	1st place, gold medalist(s)
Regan Harrison	200 m breaststroke	2:15.86	23	Did not advance			
Brett Hawke	50 m freestyle	22.42	10 Q	22.07	2 Q	22.18	6
Geoff Huegill	100 m butterfly	52.54	5 Q	52.64	6 Q	52.53	8
Adam Lucas	200 m individual medley	2:02.12	17	Did not advance			
Patrick Murphy	200 m backstroke	2:01.26	18	Did not advance			
Travis Nederpelt	200 m butterfly	1:58.93	17	Did not advance			
Travis Nederpelt	400 m individual medley	4:16.77	8 Q	—N/a		4:20.08	8
Justin Norris	200 m butterfly	1:58.05	6 Q	1:57.96	11	Did not advance	
Justin Norris	200 m individual medley	2:03.87	27	Did not advance			
Justin Norris	400 m individual medley	4:16.90	11	—N/a		Did not advance	
Adam Pine	100 m butterfly	53.45	20	Did not advance			
Jim Piper	100 m breaststroke	1:02.16	=19	Did not advance			
Jim Piper	200 m breaststroke	2:13.79	10 Q	2:12.22	8 Q	DSQ	
Craig Stevens	1500 m freestyle	15:09.54	8 Q	—N/a		15:13.66	8
Ian Thorpe	100 m freestyle	49.17	6 Q	49.21	8 Q	48.56	3rd place, bronze medalist(s)
Ian Thorpe	200 m freestyle	1:47.22	1 Q	1:46.65	2 Q	1:44.71 OR	1st place, gold medalist(s)
Ian Thorpe	400 m freestyle	3:46.55	2 Q	—N/a		3:43.10	1st place, gold medalist(s)
Josh Watson	100 m backstroke	55.18	=17	Did not advance			
Matt Welsh	100 m backstroke	55.35	9 Q	54.69	6 Q	54.52	5
Matt Welsh	200 m backstroke	2:01.73	19	Did not advance			
Ashley Callus*; Michael Klim; Todd Pearson; Eamon Sullivan; Ian Thorpe; Jono van Hazel*	4 × 100 m freestyle relay	3:17.64	6 Q	—N/a		3:15.77	6
Grant Hackett; Michael Klim; Antony Matkovich*; Todd Pearson*; Nicholas Sprenger; Craig Stevens*; Ian Thorpe	4 × 200 m freestyle relay	7:14.85	2 Q	—N/a		7:07.46	2nd place, silver medalist(s)
Michael Klim; Jim Piper; Adam Pine; Matt Welsh	4 × 100 m medley relay	3:39.14	9	—N/a		Did not advance	

* Swimmers who participated in the heats only and received medals.

Women

Athlete	Event	Heat		Semifinal		Final	
Athlete	Event	Time	Rank	Time	Rank	Time	Rank
Frances Adcock	200 m backstroke	2:14.85	15 Q	2:15.69	16	Did not advance	
Lara Carroll	200 m individual medley	2:16.17	11 Q	2:13.80	5 Q	2:13.74	6
Lara Carroll	400 m individual medley	4:46.32	12	—N/a		Did not advance	
Michelle Engelsman	50 m freestyle	25.28	5 Q	25.13	5 Q	25.06	6
Felicity Galvez	200 m butterfly	2:11.17	7 Q	2:09.54	5 Q	2:09.28	5
Elka Graham	200 m freestyle	2:00.13	7 Q	1:59.44	9	Did not advance	
Elka Graham	400 m freestyle	4:11.67	13	—N/a		Did not advance	
Marieke Guehrer	100 m backstroke	1:02.76	20	Did not advance			
Brooke Hanson	100 m breaststroke	1:07.35	1 Q	1:07.75	4 Q	1:07.15	2nd place, silver medalist(s)
Brooke Hanson	200 m breaststroke	2:27.38	6 Q	2:26.43	3 Q	2:26.39	8
Jodie Henry	100 m freestyle	55.13	7 Q	53.52 WR	1 Q	53.84	1st place, gold medalist(s)
Leisel Jones	100 m breaststroke	1:07.69	2 Q	1:06.78 OR	1 Q	1:07.16	3rd place, bronze medalist(s)
Leisel Jones	200 m breaststroke	2:26.02	1 Q	2:26.71	6 Q	2:23.60	2nd place, silver medalist(s)
Lisbeth Lenton	50 m freestyle	25.31	7 Q	24.90	2 Q	24.91	3rd place, bronze medalist(s)
Lisbeth Lenton	100 m freestyle	54.89	4 Q	55.17	9	Did not advance	
Linda Mackenzie	200 m freestyle	2:02.04	19	Did not advance			
Linda Mackenzie	400 m freestyle	4:08.46	7 Q	—N/a		4:10.92	7
Linda Mackenzie	800 m freestyle	8:35.90	10	—N/a		Did not advance	
Alice Mills	200 m individual medley	2:15.62	9 Q	2:14.95	10	Did not advance	
Melissa Morgan	200 m backstroke	2:14.06	11 Q	2:13.34	12	Did not advance	
Sarah Paton	800 m freestyle	8:35.81	9	—N/a		Did not advance	
Jennifer Reilly	400 m individual medley	4:49.04	19	—N/a		Did not advance	
Giaan Rooney	100 m backstroke	1:01.96	10 Q	1:01.41	9	Did not advance	
Jessicah Schipper	100 m butterfly	58.57	5 Q	58.63	4 Q	58.22	4
Petria Thomas	100 m butterfly	57.47	1 Q	57.93	2 Q	57.72	1st place, gold medalist(s)
Petria Thomas	200 m butterfly	2:10.87	5 Q	2:09.24	4 Q	2:06.36	2nd place, silver medalist(s)
Jodie Henry; Lisbeth Lenton; Alice Mills; Sarah Ryan*; Petria Thomas	4 × 100 m freestyle relay	3:38.26 NR	1 Q	—N/a		3:35.94 WR	1st place, gold medalist(s)
Elka Graham; Linda Mackenzie*; Giaan Rooney*; Alice Mills; Shayne Reese; Petria Thomas	4 × 200 m freestyle relay	8:01.85	3 Q	—N/a		7:57.40	4
Brooke Hanson*; Jodie Henry; Leisel Jones; Alice Mills*; Giaan Rooney; Jessicah Schipper*; Petria Thomas	4 × 100 m medley relay	4:01.17	1 Q	—N/a		3:57.21 WR	1st place, gold medalist(s)

* Swimmers who participated in the heats only and received medals.

== Synchronized swimming ==
Athlete	Event	Technical routine		Free routine (preliminary)			Free routine (final)		
Athlete	Event	Points	Rank	Points	Total (technical + free)	Rank	Points	Total (technical + free)	Rank
Amanda Laird; Leonie Nichols	Duet	38.917	24	38.834	77.751	24	Did not advance		

== Table tennis ==
Men

Athlete	Event	Round 1	Round 2	Round 3	Round 4	Quarterfinals	Semifinals	Final / BM	
Athlete	Event	Opposition Result	Opposition Result	Opposition Result	Opposition Result	Opposition Result	Opposition Result	Opposition Result	Rank
Trevor Brown	Singles	Matsushita (JPN); L 0–4	Did not advance						
William Henzell	Singles	Nguyen (USA); W 4–1	Chen Wx (AUT); L 0–4	Did not advance					
Russ Lavale	Singles	Miličević (BIH); L 2–4	Did not advance						
Trevor Brown; Russ Lavale	Doubles	—N/a	Huang / Kassam (CAN); L 0–4	Did not advance					
William Henzell; David Zalcberg	Doubles	—N/a	Mondello / Yang (ITA); W 4–1	Heister / Keen (NED); L 1–4	Did not advance				

Women

Athlete	Event	Round 1	Round 2	Round 3	Round 4	Quarterfinals	Semifinals	Final / BM	
Athlete	Event	Opposition Result	Opposition Result	Opposition Result	Opposition Result	Opposition Result	Opposition Result	Opposition Result	Rank
Lay Jian Fang	Singles	Vaida (CRO); W 4–0	Schall (GER); L 2–4	Did not advance					
Miao Miao	Singles	Espineira (PER); W 4–2	Fukuhara (JPN); L 3–4	Did not advance					
Lay Jian Fang; Miao Miao	Doubles	Bye	C Li / K Li (NZL); L 2–4	Did not advance					

== Taekwondo ==
Australia has qualified four taekwondo practitioners in their respective divisions.

Athlete	Event	Round of 16	Quarterfinals	Semifinals	Repechage 1	Repechage 2	Final / BM	
Athlete	Event	Opposition Result	Opposition Result	Opposition Result	Opposition Result	Opposition Result	Opposition Result	Rank
Carlo Massimino	Men's −68 kg	Omrani (TUN); W 7–2	Sagastume (GUA); L 4–5	Did not advance				
Daniel Trenton	Men's −80 kg	Brown (GBR); W 12–6	Karami (IRI); L 9–13	Did not advance				
Caroline Bartasek	Women's −67 kg	Juárez (GUA); L 0–7	Did not advance					
Tina Morgan	Women's +67 kg	Falavigna (BRA); L 2–7	Did not advance					

== Tennis ==
Men

Athlete	Event	Round of 64	Round of 32	Round of 16	Quarterfinals	Semifinals	Final / BM	
Athlete	Event	Opposition Score	Opposition Score	Opposition Score	Opposition Score	Opposition Score	Opposition Score	Rank
Wayne Arthurs	Singles	Hănescu (ROM); W 6–4, 7–6^{(7–4)}	Grosjean (FRA); L 6–7^{(2–7)}, 3–6	Did not advance				
Mark Philippoussis	Singles	Rochus (BEL); L 6–3, 0–6, 1–6	Did not advance					
Wayne Arthurs; Todd Woodbridge	Doubles	—N/a	Berdych / Novák (CZE); W 6–4, 6–3	Kiefer / Schüttler (GER); L 6–7^{(3–7)}, 3–6	Did not advance			

Women

Athlete	Event	Round of 64	Round of 32	Round of 16	Quarterfinals	Semifinals	Final / BM	
Athlete	Event	Opposition Score	Opposition Score	Opposition Score	Opposition Score	Opposition Score	Opposition Score	Rank
Alicia Molik	Singles	Dementieva (RUS); W 4–6, 6–0, 6–3	Srebotnik (SLO); W 7–5, 6–4	Raymond (USA); W 6–4, 6–4	Sugiyama (JPN); W 6–4, 6–3	Mauresmo (FRA); L 6–7^{(8–10)}, 3–6	Myskina (RUS); W 6–3, 6–4	3rd place, bronze medalist(s)
Nicole Pratt	Singles	Casanova (SUI); W 6–3, 7–5	Garbin (ITA); W 1–6, 7–6^{(7–5)}, 6–2	Henin-Hardenne (BEL); L 1–6, 0–6	Did not advance			
Samantha Stosur	Singles	Rubin (USA); L 2–6, 7–6^{(8–6)}, 0–6	Did not advance					
Alicia Molik; Rennae Stubbs	Doubles	—N/a	Ani / Kanepi (EST); W 6–4, 6–1	Castaño / Zuluaga (COL); W 6–4, 6–2	Li T / Sun Tt (CHN); L 3–6, 2–6	Did not advance		
Nicole Pratt; Samantha Stosur	Doubles	—N/a	Garbin / Vinci (ITA); L 0–6, 1–6	Did not advance				

== Triathlon ==
Athlete	Event	Swim (1.5 km)	Trans 1	Bike (40 km)	Trans 2	Run (10 km)	Total Time	Rank
Greg Bennett	Men's	18:19	0:16	1:01:29	0:19	31:53	1:51:41.58	4
Peter Robertson	Men's	18:16	0:16	1:01:33	0:17	35:55	1:55:44.36	24
Simon Thompson	Men's	18:19	0:17	1:02:34	0:16	31:54	1:52:47.18	10
Loretta Harrop	Women's	18:37	0:19	1:09:05	0:21	37:08	2:04:50.17	2nd place, silver medalist(s)
Rina Hill	Women's	18:41	0:21	1:15:32	0:24	37:45	2:11:58.86	33
Maxine Seear	Women's	19:39	0:19	Did not finish				

== Volleyball ==
=== Beach ===
Athlete	Event	Preliminary round	Standing	Round of 16	Quarterfinals	Semifinals	Final	
Athlete	Event	Opposition Score	Standing	Opposition Score	Opposition Score	Opposition Score	Opposition Score	Rank
Julien Prosser; Mark Williams	Men's	Pool E Blanton – Nygaard (USA); W 2 – 0 (21–16, 21–14); Heuscher – Kobel (SUI); L 1 – 2 (21–16, 20–22, 9–15); Child – Heese (CAN); W 2 – 1 (21–13, 15–21, 15–12)	2 Q	Pocock – Rorich (RSA); W 2 – 0 (21–14, 21–10)	Dieckmann – Scheuerpflug (GER); W 2 – 1 (16–21, 21–19, 15–10)	Bosma – Herrera (ESP); L 0 – 2 (18–21, 18–21)	Heuscher – Kobel (SUI); L 1 – 2 (21–19, 17–21, 13–15)	4
Andrew Schacht; Joshua Slack	Men's	Pool A Holdren – Metzger (USA); L 1 – 2 (24–22, 22–24, 13–15); Rego – Santos (BRA); L 2 – 0 (17–21, 17–21); Horrem – Maaseide (NOR); W 2 – 0 (21–18, 21–17)	3 Q	Dieckmann – Scheuerpflug (GER); L 0 – 2 (19–21, 12–21)	Did not advance			
Natalie Cook; Nicole Sanderson	Women's	Pool E P Yanchulova – T Yanchulova (BUL); W 2 – 0 (21–16, 21–12); Wang L – You Wh (CHN); W 2 – 1 (21–19, 17–21, 17–15); Pohl – Rau (GER); L 0 – 2 (10–21, 20–22)	2 Q	Lochowicz – Pottharst (AUS); W 2 – 0 (21–15, 21–16)	Gattelli – Perrotta (ITA); W 2 – 1 (21–16, 14–21, 15–12)	Bede – Behar (BRA); L 0 – 2 (17–21, 16–21)	McPeak – Youngs (USA); L 1 – 2 (18–21, 21–15, 9–15)	4
Summer Lochowicz; Kerri Pottharst	Women's	Pool F Tian J – Wang F (CHN); W 2 – 0 (21–18, 21–18); Karantasiou – Sfyri (GRE); W 2 – 1 (21–15, 15–21, 16–14); García – Gaxiola (MEX); W 2 – 0 (26–24, 22–20)	1 Q	Cook – Sanderson (AUS); L 0 – 2 (15–21, 16–21)	Did not advance			

=== Indoor ===
==== Men's tournament ====
Australian men's team qualified after finishing second at the FIVB World Olympic Qualification Tournament in Tokyo.

Roster

The following is the Australian roster in the men's volleyball tournament of the 2004 Summer Olympics.

Head coach: (Argentina) Jon Uriarte

№	Name	Date of birth	Height	Weight	Spike	Block	2004 club
1	Dan Howard (c)	13 December 1976	2.08 m (6 ft 10 in)	98 kg (216 lb)	375 cm (148 in)	340 cm (130 in)	(Italy) Marmi Lanza Verona
3	Grant Sorensen	27 March 1982	1.99 m (6 ft 6 in)	93 kg (205 lb)	337 cm (133 in)	328 cm (129 in)	(Australia) Australian Institute of Sport
4	Ben Hardy	21 September 1974	1.98 m (6 ft 6 in)	92 kg (203 lb)	335 cm (132 in)	320 cm (130 in)	(Italy) Brill Rover Bolzano
5	Luke Campbell	8 November 1979	2.02 m (6 ft 8 in)	98 kg (216 lb)	346 cm (136 in)	335 cm (132 in)	(Germany) SV Bayer Wuppertal
7	Matthew Young	17 July 1981	1.87 m (6 ft 2 in)	78 kg (172 lb)	335 cm (132 in)	323 cm (127 in)	(Spain) Jusam-Electronics
9	Andrew Earl	15 September 1982	1.96 m (6 ft 5 in)	85 kg (187 lb)	336 cm (132 in)	322 cm (127 in)	(Spain) Vigo
10	David Beard	23 October 1973	1.97 m (6 ft 6 in)	95 kg (209 lb)	342 cm (135 in)	325 cm (128 in)	(Australia) Australian Institute of Sport
12	Travis Moran (L)	16 August 1985	1.91 m (6 ft 3 in)	92 kg (203 lb)	336 cm (132 in)	320 cm (130 in)	(Australia) Australian Institute of Sport
13	David Ferguson	13 March 1982	2.05 m (6 ft 9 in)	92 kg (203 lb)	348 cm (137 in)	328 cm (129 in)	(Netherlands) Lycurgus
14	Zane Christensen	19 July 1985	2.09 m (6 ft 10 in)	103 kg (227 lb)	368 cm (145 in)	342 cm (135 in)	(Italy) Copra Asystel Piacenza
15	Hidde Van Beest	20 July 1979	2.07 m (6 ft 9 in)	106 kg (234 lb)	350 cm (140 in)	342 cm (135 in)	(Italy) 4Torri Ferrara Volley
16	Brett Alderman	27 February 1979	1.91 m (6 ft 3 in)	87 kg (192 lb)	343 cm (135 in)	328 cm (129 in)	(Germany) TSV Unterhaching

Group play

Pos	Team	Pld	W	L	Pts	SW	SL	SR	SPW	SPL	SPR	Qualification
1	Brazil	5	4	1	9	13	7	1.857	483	431	1.121	Quarterfinals
2	Italy	5	3	2	8	13	7	1.857	465	434	1.071	Quarterfinals
3	United States	5	3	2	8	11	8	1.375	437	423	1.033	Quarterfinals
4	Russia	5	3	2	8	11	9	1.222	452	430	1.051	Quarterfinals
5	Netherlands	5	2	3	7	7	11	0.636	391	419	0.933	
6	Australia	5	0	5	5	2	15	0.133	331	422	0.784	

Source: FIVB

15 August 2004; 16:00	Brazil	3–1	Australia	Peace and Friendship Stadium; Attendance: 1,853; Referees: Georgios Karampetsos (GRE), Ryszard Dietrich (POL)
15 August 2004; 16:00	(23–25, 25–19, 25–12, 25–21) result			Peace and Friendship Stadium; Attendance: 1,853; Referees: Georgios Karampetsos (GRE), Ryszard Dietrich (POL)

17 August 2004; 14:00	Australia	0–3	Russia	Peace and Friendship Stadium; Attendance: 2,815; Referees: Fernando Nava (MEX), Mahmoud Abdel Magid (EGY)
17 August 2004; 14:00	(17–25, 24–26, 23–25) result			Peace and Friendship Stadium; Attendance: 2,815; Referees: Fernando Nava (MEX), Mahmoud Abdel Magid (EGY)

19 August 2004; 09:00	Italy	3–0	Australia	Peace and Friendship Stadium; Attendance: 2,950; Referees: Ibrahim Al-Naama (QAT), Juan Pereyra (ARG)
19 August 2004; 09:00	(25–20, 25–18, 25–21) result			Peace and Friendship Stadium; Attendance: 2,950; Referees: Ibrahim Al-Naama (QAT), Juan Pereyra (ARG)

21 August 2004; 09:00	Australia	1–3	United States	Peace and Friendship Stadium; Attendance: 4,580; Referees: Fotios Lekkas (GRE), Ryszard Dietrich (POL)
21 August 2004; 09:00	(19–25, 25–23, 13–25, 19–25) result			Peace and Friendship Stadium; Attendance: 4,580; Referees: Fotios Lekkas (GRE), Ryszard Dietrich (POL)

23 August 2004; 14:00	Netherlands	3–0	Australia	Peace and Friendship Stadium; Attendance: 4,120; Referees: Mahmoud Abdel Magid (EGY), Juan Pereyra (ARG)
23 August 2004; 14:00	(25–22, 25–17, 25–16) result			Peace and Friendship Stadium; Attendance: 4,120; Referees: Mahmoud Abdel Magid (EGY), Juan Pereyra (ARG)

== Water polo ==
=== Men's tournament ===
Roster

The following is the Australian roster in the men's water polo tournament of the 2004 Summer Olympics.

Head coach: Erkin Shagaev

№	Name	Pos.	Height	Weight	Date of birth	2004 club
1	James Stanton	GK	1.98 m (6 ft 6 in)	93 kg (205 lb)	21 July 1983	(Australia) Fremantle Mariners
2	Dean Semmens	CB	1.88 m (6 ft 2 in)	89 kg (196 lb)	22 November 1979	(Spain) CN Sant Andreu
3	Trent Franklin	D	1.84 m (6 ft 0 in)	80 kg (180 lb)	12 February 1979	(Australia) Sydney University Lions
4	Pietro Figlioli	D	1.89 m (6 ft 2 in)	89 kg (196 lb)	29 May 1984	(Spain) CN Barcelona
5	Craig Miller	D	1.91 m (6 ft 3 in)	90 kg (200 lb)	23 November 1971	(Australia) Cronulla Sharks
6	Toby Jenkins	CF	1.93 m (6 ft 4 in)	95 kg (209 lb)	26 November 1979	(Australia) Brisbane Barracudas
7	Tim Neesham	D	1.84 m (6 ft 0 in)	86 kg (190 lb)	20 October 1979	(Italy) Firenze Pallanuoto
8	Sam McGregor	CB	1.92 m (6 ft 4 in)	95 kg (209 lb)	12 August 1984	(Spain) CN Terrassa
9	Thomas Whalan	CB	1.94 m (6 ft 4 in)	89 kg (196 lb)	13 October 1980	(Spain) CN Atlètic-Barceloneta
10	Gavin Woods	CF	1.99 m (6 ft 6 in)	95 kg (209 lb)	1 March 1978	(Australia) Balmain Tigers
11	Alex Osadchuk	D	1.80 m (5 ft 11 in)	86 kg (190 lb)	19 February 1972	(Australia) Brisbane Barracudas
12	Nathan Thomas (C)	D	1.93 m (6 ft 4 in)	98 kg (216 lb)	28 August 1972	(Spain) CN Barcelona
13	Rafael Sterk	GK	1.85 m (6 ft 1 in)	85 kg (187 lb)	27 January 1978	(Australia) Brisbane Barracudas

Group play

Pos	Team	Pld	W	D	L	GF	GA	GD	Pts	Qualification
1	Greece	5	4	0	1	43	27	+16	8	Qualified for the semifinals
2	Germany	5	3	1	1	40	28	+12	7	Qualified for the quarterfinals
3	Spain	5	3	0	2	35	31	+4	6	Qualified for the quarterfinals
4	Italy	5	3	0	2	39	24	+15	6	
5	Australia	5	1	1	3	37	35	+2	4	
6	Egypt	5	0	0	5	18	67	−49	0	

15 August 2004; 09:30	Egypt	3–14	Australia	Athens Olympic Aquatic Centre; Referees: Kiszelly (HUN), Valcarce (ARG)
15 August 2004; 09:30	Score by quarters: 1-3, 0-5, 1-4, 1-2			Athens Olympic Aquatic Centre; Referees: Kiszelly (HUN), Valcarce (ARG)
15 August 2004; 09:30	3 players with 1	Goals	Miller 3	Athens Olympic Aquatic Centre; Referees: Kiszelly (HUN), Valcarce (ARG)

17 August 2004; 09:30	Australia	4–8	Italy	Athens Olympic Aquatic Centre; Referees: Tomic (CRO), Chaney (USA)
17 August 2004; 09:30	Score by quarters: 1-1, 2-2, 0-3, 1-2			Athens Olympic Aquatic Centre; Referees: Tomic (CRO), Chaney (USA)
17 August 2004; 09:30	Whalan 2	Goals	Postiglione 3	Athens Olympic Aquatic Centre; Referees: Tomic (CRO), Chaney (USA)

19 August 2004; 16:30	Spain	8–4	Australia	Athens Olympic Aquatic Centre; Referees: Balfanbayev (KAZ), Tomic (CRO)
19 August 2004; 16:30	Score by quarters: 2-1, 3-1, 1-1, 2-1			Athens Olympic Aquatic Centre; Referees: Balfanbayev (KAZ), Tomic (CRO)
19 August 2004; 16:30	3 players with 2	Goals	4 players with 1	Athens Olympic Aquatic Centre; Referees: Balfanbayev (KAZ), Tomic (CRO)

21 August 2004; 17:45	Greece	10–9	Australia	Athens Olympic Aquatic Centre; Referees: Balfanbayev (KAZ), Kiszelly (HUN)
21 August 2004; 17:45	Score by quarters: 2-2, 3-2, 3-2, 2-3			Athens Olympic Aquatic Centre; Referees: Balfanbayev (KAZ), Kiszelly (HUN)
21 August 2004; 17:45	Chatzitheodorou 3	Goals	3 players with 2	Athens Olympic Aquatic Centre; Referees: Balfanbayev (KAZ), Kiszelly (HUN)

23 August 2004; 09:30	Germany	6–6	Australia	Athens Olympic Aquatic Centre; Referees: Kratochvil (SVK), Brguljan (SCG)
23 August 2004; 09:30	Score by quarters: 1-3, 2-1, 1-0, 2-2			Athens Olympic Aquatic Centre; Referees: Kratochvil (SVK), Brguljan (SCG)
23 August 2004; 09:30	Politze, Nossek 2	Goals	Woods 3	Athens Olympic Aquatic Centre; Referees: Kratochvil (SVK), Brguljan (SCG)

7th-12th Classification Quarterfinal

25 August 2004; 09:30	Kazakhstan	5–10	Australia	Athens Olympic Aquatic Centre; Referees: Matache (ROU), Patelli (BRA)
25 August 2004; 09:30	Score by quarters: 2-2, 1-4, 1-3, 1-1			Athens Olympic Aquatic Centre; Referees: Matache (ROU), Patelli (BRA)
25 August 2004; 09:30	Elke 2	Goals	Figlioli, Thomas 2	Athens Olympic Aquatic Centre; Referees: Matache (ROU), Patelli (BRA)

7th-10th Classification Semifinal

27 August 2004; 10:45	United States	6–5	Australia	Athens Olympic Aquatic Centre; Referees: Matache (ROU), Legare (CAN)
27 August 2004; 10:45	Score by quarters: 2-0, 1-1, 2-2, 1-2			Athens Olympic Aquatic Centre; Referees: Matache (ROU), Legare (CAN)
27 August 2004; 10:45	Azevedo 3	Goals	Figlioli 3	Athens Olympic Aquatic Centre; Referees: Matache (ROU), Legare (CAN)

9th-10th Classification Final

29 August 2004; 09:30	Australia	8–7	Croatia	Athens Olympic Aquatic Centre; Referees: Kiszelly (HUN), Sayed Mahmoud (EGY)
29 August 2004; 09:30	Score by quarters: 2-0, 3-4, 1-1, 2-2			Athens Olympic Aquatic Centre; Referees: Kiszelly (HUN), Sayed Mahmoud (EGY)
29 August 2004; 09:30	Whalan 5	Goals	Franković 3	Athens Olympic Aquatic Centre; Referees: Kiszelly (HUN), Sayed Mahmoud (EGY)

=== Women's tournament ===
Roster

The following is the Australian roster in the women's water polo tournament of the 2004 Summer Olympics.

Head coach: István Gorgenyi

№	Name	Pos.	Height	Weight	Date of birth	2004 club
1	Emma Knox	GK	1.73 m (5 ft 8 in)	72 kg (159 lb)	2 March 1978	(Australia) UWA Torpedoes
2	Rebecca Rippon	D	1.65 m (5 ft 5 in)	70 kg (150 lb)	26 December 1978	(Australia) Balmain Tigers
3	Nikita Cuffe	CF	1.79 m (5 ft 10 in)	73 kg (161 lb)	26 September 1979	(Australia) KFC Queensland Breakers
4	Naomi Castle (C)	CB	1.80 m (5 ft 11 in)	72 kg (159 lb)	29 May 1974	(Australia) KFC Queensland Breakers
5	Bronwyn Smith	D	1.76 m (5 ft 9 in)	65 kg (143 lb)	3 July 1974	(Australia) KFC Queensland Breakers
6	Belinda Brooks	CB	1.76 m (5 ft 9 in)	75 kg (165 lb)	3 February 1977	(Australia) Fremantle Marlins
7	Jodie Stuhmcke	CF	1.80 m (5 ft 11 in)	75 kg (165 lb)	21 November 1980	(Australia) KFC Queensland Breakers
8	Kate Gynther	D	1.75 m (5 ft 9 in)	71 kg (157 lb)	5 July 1982	(Australia) Brisbane Barracudas
9	Elise Norwood	D	1.72 m (5 ft 8 in)	65 kg (143 lb)	18 June 1981	(Australia) Sydney University Lions
10	Kelly Heuchan	D	1.75 m (5 ft 9 in)	67 kg (148 lb)	30 January 1980	(Australia) Fremantle Marlins
11	Jemma Brownlow	GK	1.68 m (5 ft 6 in)	62 kg (137 lb)	14 November 1979	(Australia) Balmain Tigers
12	Joanne Fox	CB	1.82 m (6 ft 0 in)	72 kg (159 lb)	12 June 1979	(Australia) Balmain Tigers
13	Melissa Rippon	D	1.69 m (5 ft 7 in)	70 kg (150 lb)	20 January 1981	(Australia) Brisbane Barracudas

Group play

Pos	Team	Pld	W	D	L	GF	GA	GD	Pts	Qualification
1	Australia	3	2	1	0	22	16	+6	5	Qualified for the Semifinals
2	Italy	3	2	0	1	20	14	+6	4	Qualified for the Quarterfinals
3	Greece	3	1	1	1	17	20	−3	3	Qualified for the Quarterfinals
4	Kazakhstan	3	0	0	3	16	25	−9	0	

16 August 2004; 10:45	Report	Australia	6–5	Italy	Athens Olympic Aquatic Centre; Referees: Peter Bookelman (NED); Sergio Borrell (ESP)
16 August 2004; 10:45	Report	Score by quarters: 3–1, 1–2, 1–1, 1–1			Athens Olympic Aquatic Centre; Referees: Peter Bookelman (NED); Sergio Borrell (ESP)
16 August 2004; 10:45	Report	Gynther 2 Heuchan 2 Norwood 1 Rippon 1	Goals	Allucci 1 di Mario 1 Miceli 1 Musumeci 1 Zanchi 1	Athens Olympic Aquatic Centre; Referees: Peter Bookelman (NED); Sergio Borrell (ESP)

18 August 2004; 09:30	Report	Australia	9–4	Kazakhstan	Athens Olympic Aquatic Centre; Referees: Boris Margeta (SLO); Hector Valcarce (ARG)
18 August 2004; 09:30	Report	Score by quarters: 3–2, 2–1, 2–0, 2–1			Athens Olympic Aquatic Centre; Referees: Boris Margeta (SLO); Hector Valcarce (ARG)
18 August 2004; 09:30	Report	Heuchan 3 Norwood 3 Castle 1 Gynther 1 Rippon 1	Goals	Ignatyeva 1 Jakayeva 1 Tolkunova 1 Zubkova 1	Athens Olympic Aquatic Centre; Referees: Boris Margeta (SLO); Hector Valcarce (ARG)

20 August 2004; 18:00	Report	Australia	7–7	Greece	Athens Olympic Aquatic Centre; Referees: Aaron Chaney (USA); Gábor Kiszelly (HUN)
20 August 2004; 18:00	Report	Score by quarters: 1–2, 3–5, 2–0, 1–0			Athens Olympic Aquatic Centre; Referees: Aaron Chaney (USA); Gábor Kiszelly (HUN)
20 August 2004; 18:00	Report	Castle 3 Gynther 3 Heuchan 1	Goals	Asilian 2 Lara 2 Karagianni 1 Moraiti 1 Moraitidou 1	Athens Olympic Aquatic Centre; Referees: Aaron Chaney (USA); Gábor Kiszelly (HUN)

Semifinal

24 August 2004; 18:15	Report	Australia	2–6	Greece	Athens Olympic Aquatic Centre; Referees: Pneter Bookelman (NED); Torsten Bock (GER)
24 August 2004; 18:15	Report	Score by quarters: 1–4, 0–1, 1–1, 0–0			Athens Olympic Aquatic Centre; Referees: Pneter Bookelman (NED); Torsten Bock (GER)
24 August 2004; 18:15	Report	Fox 1 Stuhmcke 1	Goals	Roumpesi 2 Karagianni 1 Kozompoli 1 Moraitidou 1 Oikonomopoulou 1	Athens Olympic Aquatic Centre; Referees: Pneter Bookelman (NED); Torsten Bock (GER)

Bronze Medal Match

26 August 2004; 17:00	Report	Australia	5–6	United States	Athens Olympic Aquatic Centre; Referees: Peter Bookelman (NED); Torsten Bock (GER)
26 August 2004; 17:00	Report	Score by quarters: 0–0, 0–4, 3–1, 2–1			Athens Olympic Aquatic Centre; Referees: Peter Bookelman (NED); Torsten Bock (GER)
26 August 2004; 17:00	Report	Brooks 2 Fox 1 Gynther 1 Norwood 1	Goals	Estes 3 Beauregard 1 Golda 1 Stachowski 1	Athens Olympic Aquatic Centre; Referees: Peter Bookelman (NED); Torsten Bock (GER)

== Weightlifting ==
Athlete	Event	Snatch		Clean & Jerk		Total	Rank
Athlete	Event	Result	Rank	Result	Rank	Total	Rank
Sergo Chakhoyan	Men's −85 kg	175	=3	~~205~~	DNF	175	DNF
Deborah Lovely	Women's −75 kg	92.5	14	115	13	207.5	13

== Wrestling ==
Key:

- VT - Victory by Fall.
- PP - Decision by Points - the loser with technical points.
- PO - Decision by Points - the loser without technical points.

Men's freestyle

Athlete	Event	Elimination Pool			Quarterfinal	Semifinal	Final / BM	
Athlete	Event	Opposition Result	Opposition Result	Rank	Opposition Result	Opposition Result	Opposition Result	Rank
Ali Abdo	−74 kg	Haidarau (BLR); L 0–4 ^{ST}	Rinella (ITA); L 0–4 ^{ST}	3	Did not advance			20

== See also ==
- Australia at the 2002 Commonwealth Games
- Australia at the 2004 Summer Paralympics
- Australia at the 2006 Commonwealth Games
