= Osadchuk =

Osadchuk (Ukrainian: Осадчук) is a Ukrainian surname. Notable people with the surname include:

- Alex Osadchuk (born 1972), Australian water polo player
- Bohdan Osadchuk (1920–2011), Ukrainian historian and journalist
- Sergei Osadchuk, Russian professional football manager

== See also ==
- Matías Osadczuk
