= Travis Moran =

Australian volleyball player (born 1985)

Personal information
- Nationality: Australian
- Born: 16 August 1985 (age 41)
- Height: 1.91 m (6 ft 3 in)
- Weight: 92 kg (203 lb)
- Spike: 336 cm (132 in)
- Block: 320 cm (130 in)

Volleyball information
- Number: 12

Career
- Years: Team
- 2004: (Australia) Australian Institute of Sport

National team
- Years: Team
- 2004: Australia

Travis Moran (born 16 August 1985) is a former Australian male volleyball player. He was part of the Australia men's national volleyball team. He competed with the national team at the 2004 Summer Olympics in Athens, Greece. He played with Australian Institute of Sport in 2004.

== Clubs ==
- (Australia) Australian Institute of Sport (2004)

== See also ==
- Australia at the 2004 Summer Olympics
