= Glencora Ralph =

Australian water polo player

Glencora McGhie
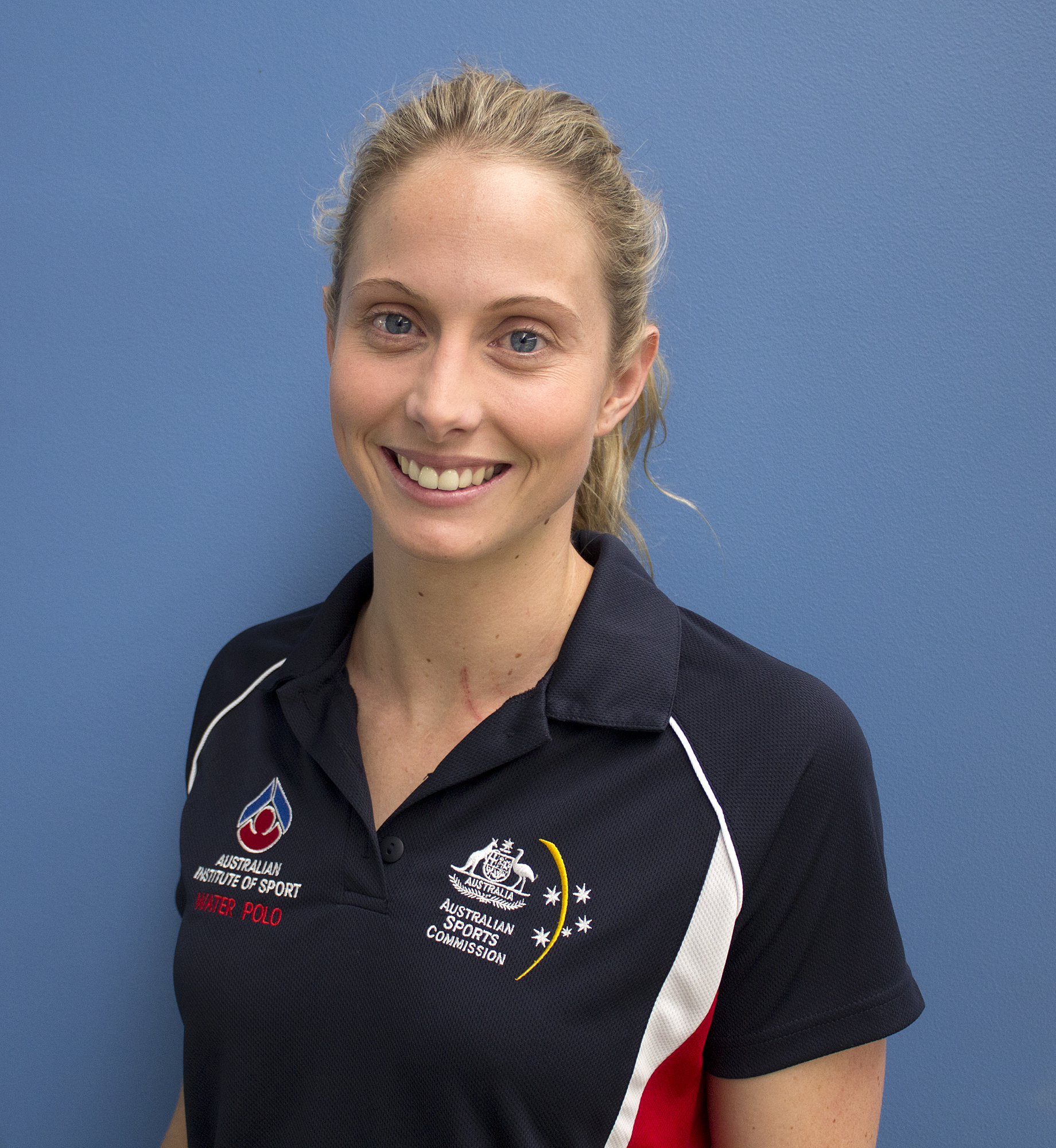

Personal information
- Nationality: Australian
- Born: Glencora Ralph; 8 August 1988 (age 38) Geraldton, Western Australia
- Height: 176 cm (5 ft 9 in)
- Weight: 67 kg (148 lb)

Sport
- Sport: Water polo
- Event: Women's team
- Club: Melville WPC
- Team: Fremantle Marlins
Medal record
Olympic Games
Bronze medal – third place	2012 London	Team competition
World Championships
Silver medal – second place	2013 Barcelona	Team competition
Canada Cup
Gold medal – first place	2011 Canada Cup	Team competition
FINA Junior World Championships
Gold medal – first place	2007 Porto, Portugal	Team competition
FINA World League Super Finals
Silver medal – second place	2010 La Jolla, USA	Team competition
Bronze medal – third place	2009 Kirishi, Russia	Team competition
FINA Women's Water Polo World Cup
Silver medal – second place	2010 World Cup	Team competition

Glencora McGhie (née Ralph; born 8 August 1988) is an Australian water polo centre back/driver. She attended the Curtin University of Technology and is a dental therapist. She competes for the Fremantle Marlins in the Australian National Water Polo League, and was on sides that won the league championship in 2003, 2004, 2006 and 2007. She has been a member of the Australia women's national water polo team on the junior and senior level. She has won gold medals at the 2011 Canada Cup and at the 2007 FINA Junior World Championships. She won silver medals at the 2010 FINA World League Super Finals and at the 2010 FINA Women's Water Polo World Cup. She won a bronze medal at the 2009 FINA World League Super Finals. She was part of the Australian water polo team that won bronze at the 2012 Summer Olympics and competed in the 2016 Summer Olympics.

== Personal life ==
Glencora Ralph was born on 8 August 1988 in Geraldton, Western Australia. She has three siblings, one of whom, Mercedes Ralph, has represented Australia on an international tour. She is 176 cm (5 ft 9 in) tall, weighs 67 kilograms (148 lb) and is right handed. In addition to water polo, she has also participated in competitive swimming but made the commitment to water polo because she found swimming boring. She has an associate degree in School Dental Therapy from the Curtin University of Technology and works as a dental therapist. She took time off from competing in water polo internationally in 2007 to complete her studies. She now goes by the name Glencora McGhie, and has three children.

== Water polo ==
Ralph took up water polo at the age of thirteen, with her first competition being the Melville Flippaball Competition. She has a water polo scholarship from the Western Australian Institute of Sport. She plays in the centre back/driver positions and prefers to wear cap number eight. As a young player, she would get up at 4 am to get to the pool to train.

=== Club water polo ===
Ralph's water polo club is Melville Water Polo Club and she plays water polo for the Longmont Fremantle Marlins in the National Water Polo League. Her team won the Australian Waterpolo League (AWL) championship in 2003, 2004, 2006, 2007, 2008 and 2014. She was with the team in 2007 as an eighteen-year-old. During 2010, she was coached by Wendy Arancini, the mother of fellow senior national team member Zoe Arancini. In 2010, in the finals tournament, she was named to the league final's All Star team. Her team finished third, beating the Cronulla team 11–9 in the bronze medal match.

In February 2023, she set an AWL record when she become the first woman to play 350 games. "Now that I have three kids," she said, "it's very much a hobby for me. But since I had the twins, water polo has become my “me” time, it’s something I’m able to do for myself which I saw as really important." As of 2024, she is still part of the Fremantle Marlins line up.

=== Junior national team ===
Ralph has represented Australia on the junior national level. She was a member of the junior national side at the 2007 FINA U20 World Championships in Porto, Portugal that won a gold medal. She was one of only two Western Australians on the team.

=== Senior national team ===
McGhie was a member of the Australia women's national water polo team. She made her senior side debut in China in 2006 during the preliminary rounds of the FINA World League. She competed in another tournament for the senior side in 2006 because Melissa Rippon and Taniele Gofers were injured. She was a member of the 2009 team that finished third at the FINA World League Super Finals in Kirishi, Russia and sixth at the FINA World Championships in Rome, Italy. In 2010, she was a member of the national team that competed in the preliminary rounds of the FINA World League in Japan from 21 to 23 May and in China from 26 to 28 May. Australia finished second in the tournament. In 2010, she was a member of the Stingers squad that competed at the FINA World Cup in Christchurch, New Zealand and earned a silver medal.

She played in the game where Australia beat Greece by a score of 11–7. She scored twice for the team during the third period. She competed Australia's 10–8 defeat of Russia. In the third quarter of the match, she scored two goals. At the 2011 Canada Cup, she scored s goal in the first period in the gold medal match against China that the Australian team ended up winning. She was named a member of the All Star team for the 2011 Canada Cup. In July 2011, she was a member of the Australian Stingers that competed in the 2011 FINA World Championships in Shanghai as a field player. In preparation for this tournament, she attended a team training camp in Perth, Western Australia. She competed in the Pan Pacific Championships in January 2012 for the Australian Stingers.

In 2012, she was part of the Stingers squad that competed in a five-game test against Great Britain at the AIS in late February 2012. This was the team's first matches against Great Britain's national team in six years. She was part of the Stingers team that competed at the 2012 London Olympics, winning bronze, and at the 2013 World Aquatics Championships in Barcelona, where the Stingers won silver after being defeated by the host nation in the final, and the 2015 World Aquatics Championships in Kazan, Russia, where the Stingers came fourth after losing to the United States in the semifinal. The following year she was part of the team at the 2016 Rio Olympics, where they came sixth.

== See also ==
- List of Olympic medalists in water polo (women)
- List of World Aquatics Championships medalists in water polo
