= Summer Lochowicz =

Australian beach volleyball player (born 1978)

Personal information
- Full name: Summer Louise Lochowicz
- Born: 30 March 1978 (age 47); Townsville, Queensland

Sport
- Country: Australia
- Sport: Beach volleyball

Summer Louise Lochowicz (born 30 March 1978 in Townsville, Queensland) is an Australian beach volleyball player and team partner of Kerri Pottharst in her Olympic debut at the 2004 Summer Olympics in Athens.

== Athens 2004 participation ==
Against	Match Score	Set 1	Set 2/Set 3 (if applicable)
SFYRI / KARADASSIOU (GRE)	2–1	21:15	15:21 / 16:14
TIAN JIA / WANG FEI (CHN)	2–0	21:18	21:18
GAXIOLA / GARCIA (MEX)	2–0	26:24	22:20
COOK / SANDERSON (AUS)	2–0	15:21	16:21
	F Pool		Round 16

== Participation in other events ==
- 2004 World Cup (Mallorca): 3rd
- 2004 World Cup (Berlin): 17th
- 2004 World (Gstaad): 5th
- 2004 World Cup (Osaka): 5th
- 2003 Indonesia Open (IND): 5th
- 2003 Stavanger Open (NOR): 5th
- 2003 Milan Open (ITA): 17th
- 2003 Gstaad Open (SUI): 17th
- 2003 Rhodes Open (GRE): 25th
- 2002 Mallorca Open (ESP): 9th
- 2002 Klagenfurt Grand Slam (AUT): 9th
- 2002 Marseille Grand Slam (FRA): 17th
