= Toby Jenkins =

Australian water polo player

- Born: Brisbane, Australia
- Education: University of Queensland
- Occupations: Athlete; businessman; author
- Employer: Bluewire Media
- Known for: 2004 Olympic Water Polo Player
- Board member of: Queensland Olympic Committee
- Website: www.tobyjenkins.com.au

Toby Jenkins is an Australian water polo player who competed in the 2004 Summer Olympics in Athens and collector of Toby jugs.

== Career ==
=== Water polo ===
Jenkins played in the Australia men's national water polo team and played Water polo at the 2004 Summer Olympics. Jenkins' water polo accolades also include being named in Queensland Water Polo's Players of the Decade 2000-2010, Queensland Water Polo's Male Player of the Year in 2001–2002, 2004–2005 and 2005–2006. He was Sportsman of the Year at University of Queensland in 2001. Jenkins won the Australian National Water Polo League Championship with the Brisbane Barracudas in 2004 and with the Queensland Breakers in 2007.

Jenkins serves as an Executive on the board of the Queensland Olympic Committee.

=== Business ===
Jenkins is also an entrepreneur, CEO, author, speaker and podcaster. He co-founded his company Bluewire Media with Adam C Franklin in 2005.

In 2009, he was featured on Australia's Hot 30 Under 30 List of Entrepreneurs. In 2010, he collaborated with David Meerman Scott on the Web Strategy Planning Template which they co-branded.

In 2014, Jenkins published the book Web Marketing That Works: Confessions from the Marketing Trenches (Wiley 2014) with his co-author Adam C Franklin. Jenkins co-hosts the podcast Web Marketing That Works.

In 2015, Toby was one of 13 Olympians interviewed for the book 15 Secrets Successful People Know About Time Management: The Productivity Habits of 7 Billionaires, 13 Olympic Athletes, 29 Straight-A Students, and 239 Entrepreneurs by Kevin Kruse.
