= Fremantle Marlins =

Australian club water polo team

Fremantle Marlins Water Polo Club
- League: National Water Polo League
- Based in: Fremantle
- Arena: Melville Water Polo Club

The Fremantle Marlins Water Polo Club is an Australian club water polo team that competes in the National Water Polo League. They are a women's team and are based in Fremantle.

== Notable team members ==
- Zoe Arancini
- Gemma Beadsworth
- Belinda Brooks
- Kelly Heuchan
- Glencora Ralph
