= Belinda Brooks =

Australian water polo player

Personal information
- Nationality: Australia
- Born: 3 February 1977 (age 49) Perth, Australia
- Height: 1.76 m (5 ft 9 in)
- Weight: 75 kg (165 lb)

Sport
- Sport: Water polo
- Position: centre back

Senior clubs
- Years: Team
- ?-?: Fremantle Marlins
National team
- Years: Team
- ?-?: Australia

Belinda Brooks (born 3 February 1977) is an Australian former water polo player. She was a member of the Australia women's national water polo team, playing as a centre back. She is also a triathlete.

She was a part of the team at the 2004 Summer Olympics. At club level, she played for Fremantle Marlins in Australia.
