= Rebel Morrow =

Australian equestrian

Personal information
- Born: 30 March 1977 (age 49) Kilcoy, Queensland, Australia

Rebel Morrow (born 30 March 1977 in Kilcoy, Queensland) is an Australian Olympic eventing rider. She competed at the 2004 Summer Olympics in Athens where she finished 11th in the individual and 6th in the team competition. The other team members were Phillip Dutton, Stuart Tinney, Andrew Hoy and Olivia Bunn. She is currently living in QLD, Australia and has not competed in any recent events. She now is a riding instructor and owns a riding school in South QLD.
