= Sid Taberlay =

Australian cyclist

Personal information
- Full name: Sid Taberlay
- Born: 1980 (age 45–46) Hobart, Tasmania, Australia
- Height: 5 ft 6 in (1.68 m)
- Weight: 136 lb (62 kg)

Cycling career
- Sport: Cycling
- Current team: Sho-Air
- Role: Rider

Professional teams
- 2001-2002: Avanti bikes
- 2003: Mapei
- 2004: Bassa
- 2005: Specialized factory racing
- 2006-2007: Team Dolphin
- 2008-2009: Team Shoair

Sid Taberlay is a professional mountain biker from Australia.

After training in 2000, he finished third in the U23 National Championships and was selected for the National Team for the U23 World Championships in Spain. Taberley finished in the top 10, qualifying him for a spot in the 2004 Olympics in Athens. Taberlay is also a five time National Champion and World Championship medalist.

== Statistics ==
Race Results

2001
1st U23 Aus National Series #2
3rd U23 Australian National Championships
World Championship Medalist
New Caledonia Tour Champion
U23 Australian National Champion
U23 Australian National Series Champion
1st Aus National Series #2
2002
Australian National Champion
U23 National Champion
MTBA National Champion
4th U23 World Cup Series
Wildside Tour Champion
1st Wildside Stages 1,2,3,4,5,6,7
2003
Wildside Tour Champion
1st Wildside Stages 1,2,3,5,6
2004
Athens Olympian
Australian National Champion
Oceania Champion
Wildside Tour Champion
1st Wildside Stages 1,5,6
Giants of Rio Champion
1st MTB Tour de France Stages 1,2,5
2005
World Cup Podium Finish (Santa Catarina, Brazil)
Wildside Tour Champion
1st Wildside Stages 2,3,6,7
1st National Series #1
1st Tour of Redlands, King of the Mountains
1st Tour Tasmania Stage 4
1st Tour of Tasmania, King of the Mountains
2006
Common Wealth Games Pro XC, 6th
Oceania MTB Championships Pro, 2nd
Australian National XC Championships Pro, 1st
2007
Mountain Bike Tour De France Pro, 1st Overall Team Classification
Australian National XC Series Pro, Overall Champion
Australian National XC Series-RD #4 Pro, st
2008
NMBS #3-Santa Ynez Pro, 1st
Sea Otter Classic Pro, 3rd
Australian National XC Championships Pro, 2nd
Pure Tasmania Wildside Stage Race Pro, Stage 7-st
Pure Tasmania Wildside Stage Race Pro, Stage 6-1st
Pure Tasmania Wildside Stage Race Pro, Stage 4-1st
Pure Tasmania Wildside Stage Race Pro, Stage 1-1st
2009
Downieville Classic Pro All Mountain, 3Rd Overall
Pro Xct # 4-Colorado Springs Pro Xc, 9Th
Pro Xct # 3-Bump N' Grind Pro Xc, 1St
Idyllwild Spring Challenge Pro Xc, 1St
Kenda Cup West #5-Santa Ynez Pro Xc, 1St
Pro Xct # 2-Sea Otter Classic Pro Xc, 2Nd
Kenda Cup West # 2-Sage Brush Ro Xc, 1St
Pro Xct #1-Fontana, Ca Pro Xc, 6Th
Kenda Cup West #1-Bonelli Park Pro Xc, 1St
2010
Pure Tasmania Wildside Stage Race Pro, Stage 1-1st
Pure Tasmania Wildside Stage Race Pro, Stage 2-1st
