= Olivia Bunn =

Australian equestrian

Personal information
- Born: 18 February 1979 (age 47) Hong Kong

Sport
- Country: Australia
- Sport: Equestrian
- Event: Eventing

Olivia Bunn (born 18 February 1979 in Hong Kong) is an Australian Olympic eventing rider. She was a reserve rider for the Sydney 2000 Olympics and then competed at the 2004 Summer Olympics in Athens in the individual and team competitions. Unfortunately her horse, twelve-year-old GV Top of the Line, nicknamed Carlo, was withdrawn before the second horse inspection. At the time Bunn with 46.4 penalties was the second best of the Australian team which finished 6th. The other team members were Rebel Morrow, Phillip Dutton, Stuart Tinney and Andrew Hoy.
