= Leonie Nichols =

Australian synchronized swimmer

Personal information
- Born: 19 March 1979 (age 47) Sydney, Australia

Sport
- Sport: Synchronised swimming

Leonie Nichols (born 19 March 1979) is an Australian synchronized swimmer who competed in the 2004 Summer Olympics.
