= Alex Osadchuk =

Australian water polo player (born 1972)

Personal information
- Born: 19 February 1972 (age 53); Lviv, Soviet Union

Sport
- Sport: Water polo

Oleksandr "Alex" Osadchuk (born 19 February 1972 in Lviv) is an Australian water polo player who competed in the 2004 Summer Olympics.
