= Michiel van Kampen =

Dutch baseball player and coach (born 1976)

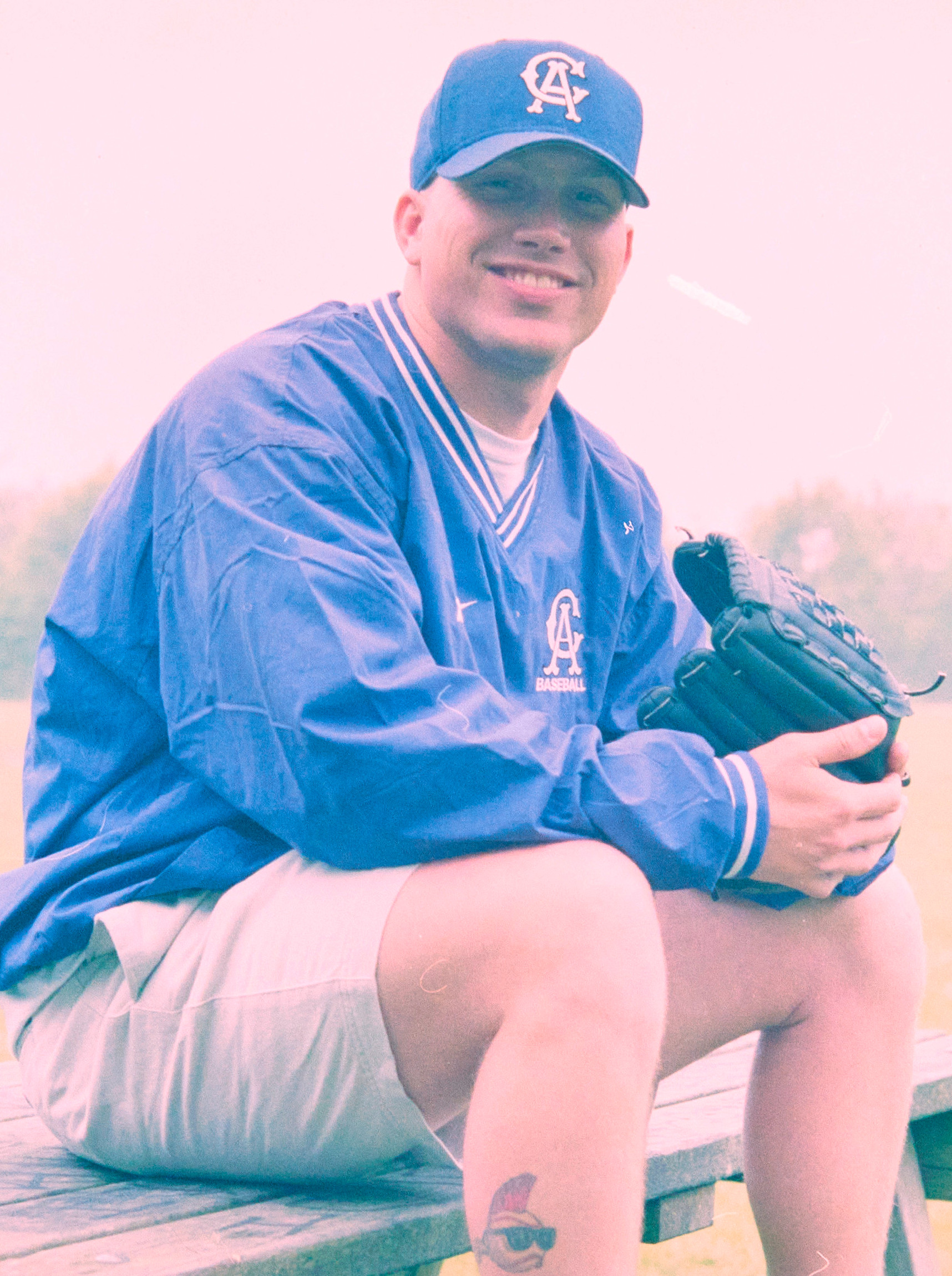
- van Kampen in 1999
- Pitcher
- Born: 23 January 1976 (age 50); Haarlem, Netherlands
- Bats: Right Throws: Right
- Stats at Baseball Reference
Medals
Men's baseball
Representing Netherlands
Intercontinental Cup
Silver medal – second place	2006 Taiwan	National team
European Baseball Championship
Gold medal – first place	1999 Italy	National team
Gold medal – first place	2001 Germany	National team
Gold medal – first place	2005 Czech Republic	National team
Gold medal – first place	2007 Spain	National team
Silver medal – second place	2010 Germany	National team

Michiel van Kampen (born 23 January 1976) is a Dutch former baseball player and current coach who pitched for the Netherlands national team in the 2008 Summer Olympics, 2006 and 2009 World Baseball Classics, and other international tournaments. He played college baseball in the United States for Treasure Valley Community College and Albertson College, graduating in 2000. He was a closer in the Honkbal Hoofdklaase, winning the most valuable player award of the 2007 Holland Series for Kinheim. He set single-season Hoofdklasse records with 33 games pitched in 2001 and 14 saves in 2004.

After his playing career, Van Kampen returned to the U.S. He worked as the bullpen coach for the Boise State Broncos in 2020 and the pitching and strength coach for the Boise Hawks, an independent minor league team, from 2021 to 2023.

== Playing career ==
=== 1997–2005 ===
van Kampen pitched at Treasure Valley Community College in 1997 and 1998. He was recruited by Gary Van Tol, who had played professionally in the Netherlands and would later coach with van Kampen. van Kampen then transferred to nearby Albertson College (now known as the College of Idaho), which finished second in the NAIA World Series in 1999, losing to in-state rival Lewis–Clark State College, and returned to the tournament in 2000. In 2000, he was 4–1 with two saves and a 2.96 earned run average (ERA) and was an honorable mention all-conference pitcher.

van Kampen made his Hoofdklasse debut in 1998 and joined the Netherlands national team for the first time in 1999. In the 1999 European Baseball Championship, he threw two scoreless innings, striking out five batters. He was the top pitcher for the Netherlands in the 2001 Baseball World Cup, allowing no runs in 5 1/3 innings, the only Dutch pitcher not to be scored upon. He had a 1.13 ERA in the 2001 World Port Tournament. That year, he appeared in 33 games for HCAW in the Hoofdklasse, setting a league record. In the 2001 European Championship, van Kampen retired all five batters he faced as the Netherlands won the tournament.

His 14 saves led the Hoofdklasse in 2002, doubling runner-up Richard Beljaards. He broke the league's single-season save record, which had been 12. In the Intercontinental Cup, van Kampen gave up one run in 2/3 of an inning against Venezuela then rebounded to pitch a scoreless inning against Japan.

van Kampen had four saves for HCAW in 2003. He had a 9.00 ERA and one save in the 2003 World Port Tournament, allowing five hits in two innings of work. He pitched once in the 2003 Baseball World Cup, tossing a scoreless inning and allowing one hit in a combined two-hit win over France. He was not on the Netherlands roster for the 2004 Summer Olympics. van Kampen saved 7 games for HCAW in 2004, third in the Hoofdklasse.

For the 2005 season, van Kampen moved to Almere'90 and was 1–2 with six saves and a 1.05 ERA. He was back with the Dutch team for the European championship, allowing one run in two innings as the Netherlands won. He had a 1.93 ERA in four appearances in the Baseball World Cup as the Dutch team finished fourth, their highest ever to that point.

=== 2006–2008 ===
van Kampen pitched in the 2006 World Baseball Classic (WBC) as the most successful Dutch pitcher in an 11–2 loss to Cuba. He relieved Calvin Maduro in the seventh inning with a 10–2 deficit. He struck out three batters in 1 1/3 innings, allowing no runs. He began by whiffing Yoandy Garlobo and Carlos Tabares. In the 8th, he retired Eduardo Paret on a grounder. He then plunked Michel Enriquez, and Yuli Gurriel reached on a fielder's choice. van Kampen fanned Joan Carlos Pedroso before giving way to Nick Stuifbergen.

van Kampen joined Kinheim for the 2006 Hoofdklasse season. He led the league with 11 saves and had a 2.30 ERA. He was 1–0 with a save and 0.00 ERA in three appearances in the first playoff round. He had a save and 1.42 ERA in the Holland Series, which Kinheim won. He committed an error on what would've been the final out of the series, attempting to run to make a force out at first base rather than throw to the first baseman but arrived later than the batter. In the Haarlem Baseball Week tournament, he was 1–0 with a 3.18 ERA for the champion Dutch squad. van Kampen threw nine scoreless innings in the 2006 Intercontinental Cup to help the Netherlands win the silver medal. He was 1–0 with a save in the competition. He threw 2 2/3 scoreless frames in a 4–3 win over former champion Australia, got the win after facing one batter in the 4–2, 10-inning victory over Chinese Taipei, and tossed the final three innings in a shutout over Japan in the semifinals for the save.

In 2007, he went 2–0 with 8 saves and a 1.05 ERA for Kinheim and only walked three batters in 25 2/3 IP. He tied Dave Draijer for the save lead in the circuit and tied Draijer for second in games pitched (23), one behind Stephen Spragg. In the Holland Series, he pitched 5 2/3 innings, allowing no runs. He saved two of the games in the three-game sweep by Kinheim and won the other contest and was named the most valuable player of the series. He had a save in the championship game of 2007 European Cup for Kinheim. It was the first European Cup title for Kinheim.

In the 2007 European championship, van Kampen threw 3 1/3 scoreless innings, saving one game as the Netherlands won the gold and qualified for the 2008 Summer Olympics. He saved two games and threw 3 1/3 scoreless innings in the 2007 World Port Tournament. van Kampen had a 1–1 record and 9.00 ERA in the 2007 Baseball World Cup. He blew a save in a 4–3 loss to Australia. Entering in the bottom of the 9th with a 3–2 lead, van Kampen walked Brad Harman. Gavin Fingleson reached on a Michael Duursma error, with Harman taking third. Luke Hughes hit a sacrifice fly to score Harman and Trent Oeltjen hit a game-winning double for Australia. In the quarterfinals, van Kampen did far better, getting the win over the host Chinese Taipei national team with a scoreless 10th. He allowed one run in the 11th after the Netherlands scored four in the top of the frame.

van Kampen struggled in the 2008 European Cup in Grosseto, Italy, for Kinheim, which won the title. He nearly blew a 4–0 lead against the Marlins Puerto Cruz in the opener, giving up three runs. Against Grosseto in the gold medal game, he stopped a scoring chance in the ninth inning but gave up a run in the 10th inning before Kinheim rallied to win. He pitched in the Summer Olympics in Beijing, where the Dutch team finished seventh. He threw 1 1/3 scoreless innings over three games. As Kinheim's closer, he had a league-leading 11 saves with a 0.90 ERA in 30 innings pitched over 23 games. He allowed the winning run of Game 1 of the Holland Series on a squeeze play and was the final pitcher of the blowout series-ending loss to Amsterdam Pirates.

=== 2009–2010 ===
van Kampen pitched in three games for the Netherlands in the 2009 WBC. He allowed a walk in a loss to Puerto Rico. He threw 2/3 of an inning, allowing another walk, in a loss to the United States.

In the Hoofdklasse, van Kampen had nine saves with a 4.12 ERA in 21 games for Kinheim. In his final season in the Dutch league, he had 11 saves and a 2.19 ERA in 22 games in 2010. In that year's European championship, he threw two scoreless innings against Greece, then one scoreless inning in the championship game loss to Italy. He retired from playing at the end of the season and moved to the U.S.

== Coaching career ==
van Kampen coached a youth baseball team in Boise, Idaho, in 2011, reuniting with his former college coach, Van Tol. He was named the bullpen and catching coach for the Boise State Broncos in August 2018, ahead of the team's first games in 2020. On 1 July, he was named the team's pitching coach, though the school cancelled its baseball program days later, after playing 14 games in its only season, which was shortened by the COVID-19 pandemic.

van Kampen was pitching and strength coach for the Boise Hawks, an independent minor league team, from 2021 to 2023, again working with Van Tol. van Kampen has also worked as the director of baseball operations for a youth baseball program in Boise.

== Personal life ==
van Kampen met his wife at Treasure Valley Community College, and they moved to Boise after his playing career ended. They have two daughters. He earned a bachelor's degree in international business and business administration 2000.

van Kampien's sister Judith van Kampen is a former softball pitcher for the Dutch women's national softball team and was the first Dutch woman to play NCAA Division I softball, for the Nevada Wolf Pack. They both played for the Netherlands in the 2008 Summer Olympics.
