= Michael Duursma =

Dutch baseball player (born 1978)

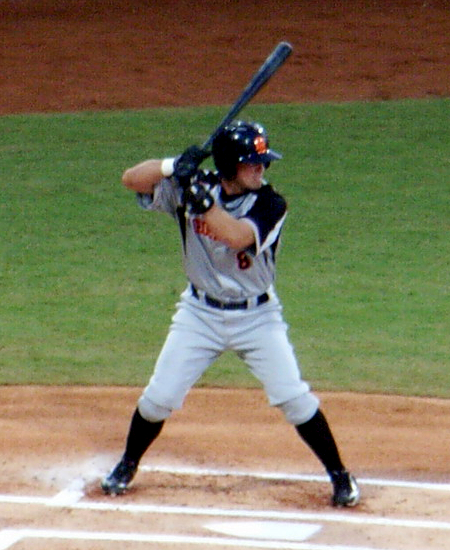
- Duursma in 2008
- Shortstop
- Born: 26 February 1978 (age 48); Heiloo, Netherlands
- Bats: Right Throws: Right
- Stats at Baseball Reference
Medals
Men's baseball
Representing Netherlands
Intercontinental Cup
Silver medal – second place	2006 Taichung	National team
European Baseball Championship
Gold medal – first place	2005 Prague	National team
Gold medal – first place	2007 Montjuïc	National team
Silver medal – second place	2010 Stuttgart	National team
Silver medal – second place	2012 Rotterdam	National team
Gold medal – first place	2014 Brno	National team
France International Baseball Tournament
Gold medal – first place	2014 Sénart	National team

Michael Steven Duursma (born 26 February 1978) is a Dutch baseball coach for the Netherlands national team in the 2026 World Baseball Classic (WBC). He is former shortstop who has played for the Dutch national team and in the Honkbal Hoofdklasse. He played in the 2008 Summer Olympics and 2006, 2009, and 2013 WBCs.

== Playing career ==
Duursma played college baseball at Cypress College in Cypress, California, in 1998 and 1999. He had a .343/.407/.414 slash line in 1999 as a sophomore. He also was with HCAW in the Hoofdklasse and was named the best defender at the European Champions Cup (A-Pool). He went 5-for-9 with two runs scored, two runs batted in (RBI), two doubles, and a stolen base as HCAW lost the 1999 Holland Series.

In 2000, he transferred to the Purdue Boilermakers. As a junior, he hit .267/.367/.331. He was hit by a pitch 13 times, which at the time ranked second in school history behind Sean Helsel. He played for the Dutch team in the preliminary games for the 2000 Summer Olympics but was not selected for the final squad that represented the nation in Sydney.

In his senior year at Purdue, he hit .267 and was named the first-team All-Big Ten Conference shortstop. He batted .298/.378/.416 and went 3-for-7 in the Big Ten Conference tournament. Overall, he had hit .283/.351/.374 with Purdue.

Duursma returned to the Netherlands with the Minolta Pioniers. He hit .340 in 2002 but did not qualify for the batting championship; he would have tied Percy Isenia for fourth in Hoofdklasse. Duursma tied for sixth with two triples. He replaced Ralph Milliard on the Dutch national team for the 2003 World Port Tournament but was a part-time player, going 0-for-2 with 3 runs in five games. He also was on the European Cup winners with Pioniers. He led the Hoofdklasse in runs (43, six more than runner-up Milliard) and tied for ninth with 10 steals.

Duursma hit .328 in 2004, fifth in Hoofdklasse. He again led in runs (39, four more than René Cremer) and tied Johnny Balentina for sixth in hits (45) and led in steals (20 in 21 tries, two more steals than Milliard). He also went 0-for-4 against Japan in the Haarlem Baseball Week. He failed to make the team for the 2004 Summer Olympics as the Dutch went with Evert-Jan 't Hoen, Milliard, and Raily Legito on the middle infield.

In 2005, Duursma batted .307/.439/.346 and fielded .964. He was tenth in Hoofdklasse in average, fifth with 47 hits (one behind brother Mark), sixth with 24 RBI and tied for seventh with 9 steals. He led the European Championship with 14 walks in 10 games; no one else had more than 9. He also played error-free ball at second base. In the Baseball World Cup, Duursma hit .302/.412/.395 with 12 runs in 11 games.

In the 2006 World Baseball Classic, Duursma played once, going 2-for-4 with two strikeouts in the Dutch win over Panama. He led off and played second base. He slipped a bit in the Hoofdklasse, hitting .274/.433/.306 with 12 steals in 13 tries and a .952 fielding percentage. He was again second in Hoofdklasse in runs, with 38, two behind leader Balentina. He was fourth inin stolen bases. He led the league with 11 times hit by pitch and his 33 walks tied his brother Mark for the lead. In the 2006 Holland Series, he hit .278/.409/.333 in a losing cause, leading the Series with two steals.

Also in 2006, he was 4-for-15 with 4 walks and 3 runs in the Haarlem Baseball Week as the Netherlands took the title. In the Intercontinental Cup, Duursma batted .323/.432/.323. In the gold medal game, with the Netherlands down 3–2 in the bottom of the 10th inning, Duursma singled off of Frank Montieth, then scored on a double by Dirk van 't Klooster. The Dutch team lost in the 11th inning, getting the silver medal.

Duursma batted .319/.440/.333 in the 2007 Hoofdklasse season, scoring 37 runs in 38 games. He tied for 10th in the league in OBP, was fourth in runs and tied for fifth with 25 walks. He hit .231/.286/.231 in the Holland Series; his 3 hits came in Game 1, in which he also had a crucial run-costing error. The Pioniers lost the Series to Kinheim. Duursma hit .143/.208/.286 and made two errors as the worst Dutch starting position player in the European Championship. The team still won the gold and qualified the 2008 Summer Olympics. He was 3-for-16 with 4 walks in the 2007 World Port Tournament. Duursma struggled again in the Baseball World Cup, going 1-for-7 with a run and an error in three games as Roel Koolen took over as the main second baseman.

Duursma played for Dutch national team at the 2008 Haarlem Baseball Week and batted .200 and led the team with 5 walks. He was selected by coach Robert Eenhoorn in the team that represents the Netherlands at the 2008 Summer Olympics in Beijing. During the 2008 season, he batted .279 in Hoofdklasse and scored 34 runs in 38 games for Pioniers.

In 2009, Duursma played for the Dutch national team, which upset the Dominican Republic at the 2009 World Baseball Classic. Duursma batted .260 in Hoofdklasse and scored 31 runs in 33 games while playing shortstop for Pioniers. At the World Port Tournament, he played shortstop and second base and led the tournament with 10 walks in 8 games.

Duursma struggled in 2010, when he batted .203/.309/.258 but had a .957 fielding percentage for Pioniers. Playing at the Haarlem Baseball Week he batted .294 as the Dutch team took the title. In Germany, at the European Baseball Championship he batted .273 with a home run while playing shortstop and second base. The Dutch lost the final against Italy.

In 2011, Duursma batted .301/.451/.368 in the Hoofdklasse. His .451 OBP was third in the league and his 32 walks was tied for third in the league. He ended up scoring 33 runs in 39 games for Pioniers. At shortstop, Duursma, had a .963 fielding percentage. Pioniers went on to win the play-offs as Duursma went 12-for-29 for a .414 average and had a .528 OBP before struggling in the Holland Series as Pioniers lost to Amsterdam. Duursma was selected by coach Brian Farley for the 2011 World Port Tournament and started at shortstop all 8 games while batting .261 for the Dutch. He was the final Durch position player cut before the World Cup.

In 2012, Duursma batted .333/.465/.389 in 2012 while playing for Pioniers in Hoofdklasse. His .333 average was tied for 9th in the league, while his .465 on-base percentage was 3rd highest. He scored 30 runs and had 28 runs batted in and had a .963 fielding percentage at shortstop. His 10 sac bunts led Hoofdklasse. During the 2012 Haarlem Baseball Week he started all 7 games at shortstop for the Dutch national team. He led the tournament with a .429 average, going 9-for-21 and a tournament high .600 OBP. At the 2012 European Baseball Championship, Duursma played third base as Italy went on to beat the Netherlands in the final.

Duursma ended his playing career after the 2016 Hoofdklasse season.

== Coaching career ==
During his playing career, Duursma knew he wanted to be a coach. He was a graduate assistant coach at Purdue in 2002. He coached a Dutch youth team at the 2017 Colt World Series in the U.S. That year, he won the country's Bill Arce Award, given to the most promising manager. He managed the Netherlands national under-15 team at the 2018 U-15 Baseball World Cup. He has also been an instructor at Rabbits Baseball.

Duursma became the manager of Amsterdam Pirates after the 2019 season. He won the Holland Series in 2021, then left the team.

Duursma became a coach the Netherlands national team at the 2022 Haarlem Baseball Week then the 2023 European Championship. He was part of the Dutch team that won the 2025 European title.

Duursma was a coach for the Netherlands in the 2026 World Baseball Classic.

== Personal life ==
Duursma's brother also played college baseball and for the Netherlands national team.
