= 2006 in baseball =

The following are the baseball events of the year 2006 throughout the world.

== Headline Event of the Year ==
- The 2006 World Baseball Classic final 4 teams are Japan, Cuba, Korea and the Dominican Republic, with the United States at 3–3 failing to qualify for the semi-finals. Under the leadership of manager Sadaharu Oh and veterans Ichiro Suzuki and Daisuke Matsuzaka, Japan (5–3) wins the Classic, defeating Cuba (5–3) in the single championship game. Korea at 6–1 has the best overall Classic record.

== Champions ==
=== Major League Baseball ===
- Regular Season Champions

League	Eastern Division Champion	Central Division Champion	Western Division Champion	Wild Card Qualifier
American League	New York Yankees	Minnesota Twins	Oakland Athletics	Detroit Tigers
National League	New York Mets	St. Louis Cardinals	San Diego Padres	Los Angeles Dodgers

- World Series Champion – St. Louis Cardinals
- Postseason – October 3 to October 27

Division Series; TV: ESPN/FOX
1	New York Yankees	1
4	Detroit Tigers	3
American League
2	Minnesota Twins	0
3	Oakland Athletics	3
1	New York Mets	3
4	Los Angeles Dodgers	0
National League
2	San Diego Padres	1
3	St. Louis Cardinals	3

League Championship Series; TV: FOX
4	Detroit Tigers	4
3	Oakland Athletics	0
1	New York Mets	3
3	St. Louis Cardinals	4

World Series; TV: FOX
AL4	Detroit Tigers	1
NL3	St. Louis Cardinals	4

Click on any series score to link to that series' page.
Higher seed had home field advantage during Division Series and League Championship Series.
The American League champion had home field advantage during the World Series as a result of the AL victory in the 2006 All-Star Game.

- Postseason MVPs
  - World Series MVP – David Eckstein
  - ALCS MVP – Plácido Polanco
  - NLCS MVP – Jeff Suppan
- All-Star Game, July 11 at PNC Park – American League, 3–2; Michael Young, MVP
  - Century 21 Home Run Derby, July 10 – Ryan Howard, Philadelphia Phillies

=== Other champions ===
- Minor League Baseball
  - Triple-A Championship: Tucson Sidewinders (Diamondbacks) def. Toledo Mud Hens (Tigers)
    - International League: Toledo Mud Hens (Tigers) def. Rochester Red Wings (Twins)
    - Pacific Coast League: Tucson Sidewinders (Diamondbacks) def. Round Rock Express (Astros)
    - Mexican League: Leones de Yucatán
  - AA
    - Eastern League: Portland Sea Dogs
    - Southern League: Montgomery Biscuits
    - Texas League: Corpus Christi Hooks
  - A-Advanced
    - California League: Inland Empire 66ers
    - Carolina League: Kinston Indians
    - Florida State League: St. Lucie Mets
  - Class A
    - Midwest League: West Michigan Whitecaps
    - South Atlantic League: Lakewood BlueClaws
  - Class A-Short Season
    - New York–Penn League: Staten Island Yankees
    - Northwest League: Salem-Keizer Volcanoes
  - Rookie
    - Appalachian League: Danville Braves
    - Gulf Coast League: GCL Red Sox
    - Pioneer League: Missoula Osprey
- Independent baseball leagues
  - Alaska Baseball League: Peninsula Oilers
  - American Association: Fort Worth Cats
  - Atlantic League: Lancaster Barnstormers
  - Canadian-American Association: Quebec Capitales
  - Frontier League: Evansville Otters
  - Golden Baseball League: Reno Silver Sox
  - Northern League: Fargo-Moorhead Redhawks
  - United League Baseball: Alexandria Aces
- Amateur
  - College World Series
    - Division I: Oregon State def. North Carolina
    - Division II: Tampa def. Cal State Chico
    - Division III: Marietta def. Wheaton (MA)
    - NAIA: Lewis-Clark State def. Cumberland
  - Youth
    - Big League World Series: District 13 (Thousand Oaks, California)
    - Junior League World Series: El Campo LL (El Campo, Texas)
    - Little League World Series: Northern Little League (Columbus, Georgia)
    - Senior League World Series: Paraguana LL (Punto Fijo, Venezuela)
  - Cape Cod Baseball League: Yarmouth-Dennis Red Sox def. Wareham Gatemen
  - Valley Baseball League: Luray Wranglers
- Outside of the United States
  - World Baseball Classic: Japan; Daisuke Matsuzaka, MVP
  - Intercontinental Cup: Cuba
  - Asian Games: Chinese Taipei
  - Caribbean World Series: Leones del Caracas (Venezuela)
  - European Cup: San Marino (San Marino/Italy)
  - Konami Cup Asia Series: Hokkaido Nippon Ham Fighters (Japan)
  - China Baseball League: Tianjin Lions
  - Cuban National Series: Industriales def. Santiago de Cuba
  - Dominican Winter League: Tigres del Licey def. Águilas Cibaeñas
  - Holland Series: Corendon Kinheim
  - Italian Serie A1 Scudetto: Telemarket Rimini
  - Japan Series: Hokkaido Nippon Ham Fighters
  - Korean Series: Samsung Lions
  - Mexican Pacific League: Venados de Mazatlán
  - Puerto Rican Professional Baseball League: Gigantes de Carolina
  - Taiwan Series: La New Bears over Uni-President Lions (4–0)
  - Venezuelan Professional Baseball League: Leones del Caracas

== Awards and honors ==
- Baseball Hall of Fame inductions
  - Bruce Sutter is selected by the BBWAA.
  - In a special election by the Committee on African-American Baseball, seventeen Negro league figures are elected (all posthumously): Ray Brown, Willard Brown, Andy Cooper, Frank Grant, Pete Hill, Biz Mackey, Effa Manley, José Méndez, Alex Pompez, Cum Posey, Louis Santop, Mule Suttles, Ben Taylor, Cristóbal Torriente, Sol White, J. L. Wilkinson, and Jud Wilson. Manley is the first woman ever elected to the Hall. Including Sutter, the 18 inductees are the largest class in the Hall's history.
  - Gene Elston is selected to receive the Ford C. Frick Award. During his 47 years in the broadcast booth, the former Astros announcer brought a no-nonsense approach to reporting the happenings on the diamond.
  - Tracy Ringolsby, longtime columnist for the Rocky Mountain News, is awarded the J. G. Taylor Spink Award.

Award	National League	American League
Most Valuable Player	Ryan Howard, PHI	Justin Morneau, MIN
Cy Young	Brandon Webb, AZ	Johan Santana, MIN
Manager of the Year	Joe Girardi, FLA	Jim Leyland, DET
Rookie of the Year	Hanley Ramírez, FLA	Justin Verlander, DET
Batting title	Freddy Sanchez, PIT	Joe Mauer, MIN

- Woman Executive of the Year (major or minor league): Ashley Forlini, Reading Phillies, Eastern League

== Events ==
=== January–March ===
- February 2 – Ramón Hernández hits for the cycle and drives in five runs, leading the Leones del Caracas of Venezuela to a 17–1 rout of Mexico's Venados de Mazatlán in the Caribbean Series opener. Alex Cabrera adds a home run with four RBI, and starting pitcher Geremi González strikes out seven in seven innings. In the other Series opener, Anderson Hernández hits a tiebreaking single in the 11th inning to help the Dominican Republic's Tigres del Licey beat the Gigantes de Carolina of Puerto Rico, 5–4. Miguel Tejada drives in two runs in the third inning, giving the Dominicans a 2–0 lead. According to baseball historians, Hernández's feat is the first in Caribbean Series play dating back to the 1949 Series.
- February 7 – Venezuela, represented by Leones del Caracas, wins its first Caribbean Series championship since 1989 by rallying for two runs in the bottom of the ninth inning to beat the Tigres del Licey of the Dominican Republic's team, 5–4. Álex González singles in the tying run off Jorge Sosa and scores the game-winning run on Henry Blanco's pop-fly double. Series MVP Ramón Hernández also hits a home run for Venezuela, which finishes 6–0 in the Series.
- March 3 – In the first World Baseball Classic game, Jae Weong Seo pitches two-hit ball and Chan Ho Park works three effective innings for a save to lead South Korea past Taiwan 2–0. The first game of the 16-nation tournament starts at 11:30 a.m. local time and is played before a sparse crowd of 5,193 at Tokyo Dome. In the second game, playing before a crowd of 15,869, Tsuyoshi Nishioka and Kosuke Fukudome hit back-to-back home runs in the fifth inning to lead Japan to an 18–2 rout of China.
- March 10 – In the World Baseball Classic, Giants minor leaguer Shairon Martis pitches a no-hitter for the Netherlands in a 10–0 victory over Panama that ends after seven innings because of the mercy rule.
- March 14 – In the World Baseball Classic, Hee-Seop Choi hits a 3-run pinch hit home run to help Team Korea stun the United States.
- March 19 – After 19 seasons, two-time NL All-Star pitcher Al Leiter retires after his first 2006 spring training appearance for the Yankees.
- March 20 – Japan defeats Cuba 10–6 in the championship game of the 2006 World Baseball Classic. After falling behind 6–1 early in the game, Cuba pulls back to within one run entering the ninth inning before Japan closes the door. The championship game of the first international baseball tournament open to players from Major League Baseball features teams that, combined, have only two players on a Major League roster.
- March 28 – Marquis Grissom announces his retirement after a 17-year career. The MVP of the 1997 ALCS, a four-time Gold Glove winner and two-time All-Star, Grissom retires as one of seven players with 2,000 hits, 200 home runs and 400 stolen bases.
- March 30 – Commissioner Bud Selig appoints Red Sox director and former U.S. Senate Majority Leader George J. Mitchell to head a probe into the use of steroids and other performance-enhancing drugs in the major leagues. The investigation is initially limited to events since September 2002, when such drugs were banned in the majors, but Mitchell has the authority to expand its scope.

=== April–June ===
- April 6:
  - In the Phillies' 4–2 loss to the Cardinals, Jimmy Rollins goes 0–4, ending his multi-season hitting streak at 38 games.
  - R. A. Dickey of the Rangers ties a post-1900 major league record by giving up six home runs in 3 1/3 innings in Texas' 10–6 loss to the Tigers. Dickey had converted to throwing knuckleballs the previous season, and after this game he was sent to the Rangers' AAA team to work on it. Chris Shelton led the charge with two home runs. Magglio Ordóñez also hit two home runs, but only one off Dickey.
- April 9 – Cory Sullivan of the Rockies becomes only the eleventh player in major league history to triple twice in the same inning. It is the first time the feat had been accomplished in over fifty years. The two triples came against Padres pitchers Jake Peavy and Chan Ho Park.
- April 10 – The Cardinals play their first official game at the New Busch Stadium, a 6–4 victory over the Brewers.
- April 11 – Japanese outfielder Tomoaki Kanemoto sets a new world record for playing every inning in the most consecutive games, 904, breaking Cal Ripken Jr.'s mark of 903.
- April 13 – The first sellout in Seattle Mariners history occurs when 54,597 fans attend the season opener at Safeco Field.
- April 17 – Pedro Martínez of the Mets becomes the 103rd major league pitcher in the modern era (and the 131st overall, including the pre-1900 era) to win 200 games in his career with a 4–3 victory over the Braves at Shea Stadium.
- April 18 – A sellout crowd of 42,191 watch the Chicago White Sox play their first game at new Comiskey Park and sees the home team get crushed by the Detroit Tigers, 16–0.
- April 22 – The Brewers hit a record-tying five home runs in the fourth inning, scoring seven runs, as they defeat the Reds 11–0. Bill Hall, Damian Miller, Brady Clark and J. J. Hardy all hit their home runs off of Brandon Claussen before the first out is recorded in the inning. Prince Fielder hits the fifth homer off of Chris Hammond with two out. Miller's and Clark's are two-run homers, while the rest are solo.
- April 26 – Mike Piazza hits 400th career home run.
- April 28:
  - In a 6–2 victory over the Brewers, Cubs pitcher Greg Maddux earns the victory with 6 strikeouts and 2 ER over 6.0 IP, earning the first 5–0 start of his career.
  - Two home run records are tied or broken: Kevin Mench of the Rangers becomes the first right-handed batter in major league history to hit home runs in seven consecutive games, and Albert Pujols of the Cardinals ties a record with his 13th home run in the month of April. Mench failed to homer in his next game, falling short of tying the all-time record of eight consecutive games with a homer. Pujols would go on to break the record with 14 homers in April.
- May 3–4 – The Washington Nationals are bought by Theodore N. Lerner, who has agreed to pay Major League Baseball's price of $450 million for the franchise; the following day, they break ground on their new ballpark.
- May 13 – Major League Baseball introduces a new Mothers' Day tradition around the league. All players and umpires wore bright pink wristbands, and several players used bright pink bats, which were auctioned off following the day's play. $350,000 was raised for the Susan G. Komen for the Cure breast cancer charity.
- May 15 – The annual Hall of Fame Game between the Reds and the Pirates is cancelled due to rain with the Reds leading 3–0 in the third inning; it is the fifth rainout in the game's history, and the first since 1993.
- May 20 – Barry Bonds ties Babe Ruth for second place on the career list, and first place among left-handed hitters, with his 714th home run during the Giants' road game against the Athletics.
- May 21 – The Minnesota Legislature, on the last full day of the 2006 session, approves a new ballpark for the Minnesota Twins, scheduled to open for the 2010 season. Under the bill, the Twins are prohibited from being folded by Major League Baseball or moved from the state of Minnesota for the 30-year duration of the initial lease. The bill was signed into law by Governor Tim Pawlenty at the Twins' May 23 home game vs. the Indians.
- May 24 – In the Cardinals' 10–4 victory at San Francisco, pitcher Adam Wainwright becomes the seventh pitcher in history (22nd player overall) to hit a home run on the first major league pitch he sees.
- May 27 – Curt Schilling of the Red Sox becomes the 104th major league pitcher in the modern era (and the 132nd overall, including the pre-1900 era) to win 200 games in his career with a 6–4 victory over the Devil Rays at Fenway Park.
- May 28 – Barry Bonds hits his 715th career home run off Rockies pitcher Byung-hyun Kim in a 6–3 loss at AT&T Park. With the home run, Bonds passes Babe Ruth for second place on the career list and sets a new record for home runs by a left-handed hitter.
- June 6 – It is reported that U.S. federal officials have raided Diamondbacks pitcher Jason Grimsley's home looking for evidence that he was a distributor of human growth hormone and other performance-enhancing drugs. They found he had received a package. A day later he quits the Diamondbacks, and it is announced that he has given authorities names of people he knew that took steroids and HGH.
- June 18 – Kenny Rogers of the Tigers becomes the 105th major league pitcher in the modern era (and the 133rd overall, including the pre-1900 era) to win 200 games in his career with a 12–3 victory over the Cubs at Wrigley Field.
- June 21:
  - Mets shortstop José Reyes becomes the ninth player in team history to hit for the cycle.
  - The Alaska Goldpanners of the Alaska Baseball League beat Omaha in Fairbanks in the 100th annual Midnight Sun Game.
- June 30 – Adam Dunn hits a walk-off grand slam with 2 outs in the ninth for a 9–8 Reds victory over the Indians, becoming only the 14th player ever to hit a walk-off grand slam for a 1-run win with two out in the ninth inning.
  - The Atlanta Braves finish the month of June with a 6–21 record, spelling the end of their division title streak at 14.

=== July ===
- July 1 – Baltimore's Miguel Tejada plays in his 1,000th consecutive game in a 7–4 win over the Braves.
- July 2:
  - Cubs outfielder Ángel Pagán becomes the first player in major league history to hit his first two career home runs on his birthday with a pair of homers in a game against the White Sox at Wrigley Field.
  - The Twins become the first team in baseball history to collect all three monthly player awards as Joe Mauer is named Player of Month, Johan Santana earns Pitcher of the Month and Francisco Liriano is selected as Rookie of the Month for June.
- July 4 – The Indians defeat the Yankees 19–1, the second time the Indians have routed the Yankees in significant fashion. The Indians hit 6 homers in the game and have a 9-run 5th inning. Jake Westbrook is the winner after also winning the first rout of the Yankees.
- July 5 – In an 11–3 win over the Indians, Yankees starting pitcher Mike Mussina becomes the first pitcher in AL history to win 10 or more games for 15 consecutive seasons.
- July 7 – Cleveland designated hitter Travis Hafner hits his fifth grand slam of the season in the Indians' 9–0 win over the Orioles. Hafner becomes the first player in major league history to hit five grand slams before the All-Star break.
- July 9 – The White Sox and the Red Sox play a 19-inning game spanning 6 hours and 19 minutes at U.S. Cellular Field in Chicago. The teams use a combined 16 pitchers, who throw a combined 570 pitches. The White Sox win 6–5.
- July 10 – Phillies first baseman Ryan Howard hits 23 home runs on his way to winning the Home Run Derby, beating Mets third baseman David Wright.
- July 11:
  - Major League Baseball announces that FOX Sports has signed on to a new seven-year contract to continue airing Major League Baseball on Fox, ensuring that the World Series will air on FOX through the 2013 season. They will also be airing their Saturday Game of the Week and alternating League Championship Series throughout the contract. TBS Sports also signs a contract that will give them 28 nationwide MLB games a year beginning in 2008, all Division Series and wild-card tiebreaker games beginning this year, and a reduction in their nationwide contract on Atlanta Braves games from 70 a year to 45 a year starting in 2008. The other LCS contract is still being negotiated at this date.
  - The American League wins the All-Star Game 3–2 when Michael Young hits a 2-RBI triple against Trevor Hoffman with two outs in the top of the ninth to secure the AL's ninth consecutive victory; Young also makes a fine catch of a short fly ball to end the game with the tying run on second base. Vladimir Guerrero and David Wright had exchanged home runs early in the game, with Carlos Beltrán later scoring for the NL on a wild pitch.
  - Jim Eriotes of the Sioux Falls Canaries becomes, at age 83, the oldest player ever to bat in a professional baseball game. A former minor league outfielder, he strikes out as the leadoff hitter, fouling off one pitch.
- July 13 – In the Cardinals' first game after the All-Star break, Albert Pujols hits a walk-off home run in the 14th inning to beat the Dodgers 3–2.
- July 15 – For the first time since 1978, all major league games in a single day finish without a single save being recorded.
- July 16:
  - Cliff Floyd and Carlos Beltrán of the Mets both hit grand slams during a club-record 11-run sixth inning in a 13–7 victory over the Cubs; eight of the 11 runs are unearned following a pair of errors by Todd Walker. It is also the first time the Mets have hit two grand slams in one inning, or even an entire game. It is the first time that two grand slams were hit in one inning by a team since Fernando Tatís hit two in one inning for the Cardinals on April 23, 1999.
  - With a two-run home run against the Padres at Petco Park, Chipper Jones of the Braves ties a major league record with an extra base hit in his 14th straight game. The record was set in 1927 by the Pirates' Paul Waner.
  - Mariano Rivera of the Yankees becomes the fourth pitcher ever to record 400 saves when he pitches two shutout innings. The Yankees beat the White Sox 6–4.
- July 18 – At the age of 94, former Negro leagues legend Buck O'Neil becomes the oldest player to play in a professional baseball game, leading off for both teams (by means of an unorthodox mid-game "trade") in the Northern League All-Star Game in Kansas City, Kansas. He is intentionally walked in both plate appearances.
- July 20 – The Brooklyn Cyclones and Oneonta Tigers play the longest game in the history of the New York–Penn League with a 26-inning match, beating the previous record set in 1981 when the Batavia Muckdogs and Auburn Doubledays played for 22 innings. The Tigers defeated the Cyclones, 6–1, thanks to scoring five runs in the top of the 26th inning off Brooklyn outfielder Mark Wright, who had entered the game to pitch despite having not pitched in any games during his college career. Oneonta center fielder and leadoff hitter Deik Scram was hitless in his first 11 at-bats, but his single in the 26th inning scored the go-ahead run for the Tigers. Brooklyn manager George Greer was ejected in the first inning for arguing a call and watched the rest of the game from the clubhouse. The two teams combined used 14 pitchers, struck out 38 batters, issued 14 walks, and got 34 hits.
- July 28 – Luke Scott becomes the first Houston rookie to hit for the cycle in the Astros' 11-inning 8–7 loss to the Diamondbacks.

=== August ===
- August 1:
  - Lee Seung-Yeop became the third player in baseball history to hit 400-career home runs before the age of 30. The others are Sadaharu Oh and Alex Rodriguez.
  - Tigers shortstop Carlos Guillén hits for the cycle against the Devil Rays at Tropicana Field, becoming the first Tigers player to do so since Damion Easley in 2001.
- August 3 – In his Dodgers debut, Greg Maddux pitches six hitless innings before departing due to a rain delay in a 3–0 win at Cincinnati.
- August 5:
  - The Baltimore Orioles downed the New York Yankees at Camden Yards, as rookie starter Adam Loewen allowed one hit in 6 1/3 innings, while relievers Todd Williams and LaTroy Hawkins combined for 2 2/3 innings of shutout ball in the 5–0 victory. Bobby Abreu's first inning single was the Yankees only safety.
  - The San Diego Padres defeated the Washington Nationals, 6–3. Closer Trevor Hoffman earned the save for San Diego, setting a Major League record with his career 11th 30-save season.
- August 13 – Indians designated hitter Travis Hafner hits his sixth grand slam of the season, tying Don Mattingly for the major league season record.
- August 14 – Yankees pitcher Randy Johnson tallies his 4,500th career strikeout, retiring Angels designated hitter Tim Salmon in the 4th inning.
- August 15 – Braves outfielder Matt Diaz tallies his tenth hit in ten plate appearances, tying the NL record for consecutive hits in consecutive appearances. A ninth inning ground out against Washington reliever Chris Schroder ends Diaz's streak two hits away from the major league record of twelve.
- August 18 to August 19 – The Yankees and Red Sox play two games lasting for a total of eight hours and 40 minutes and set the record for the longest major league game by time for a 9-inning game (4 hours and 45 minutes). The record for longest doubleheader consisting of two 9-inning games of 7 hours and thirty-nine minutes was not considered to be broken because separate admission was required to each of the day's two games.
- August 22 – Carlos Delgado of the Mets hits two home runs against the Cardinals. The second, a grand slam, is the 400th of his career. The Mets came back from 7–1 to win 8–7, thanks to a Carlos Beltrán walk-off home run.
- August 23 – The Kansas City Royals sprint out to a 10–1 lead in the first inning, but cannot hold the big lead and lose 15–13 to the Cleveland Indians in 10 innings.
- August 29 – Mariners relief pitcher Rafael Soriano receives a concussion after being struck by a line drive hit by Vladimir Guerrero of the Angels. There is no fracture, however, and the injury is not serious. The ball caroms off Soriano's head behind his left ear, and goes into the Mariners dugout. It is ruled a base hit because it touched a player before going foul. The Mariners win the game 6–4.
- August 30 – Curt Schilling of the Red Sox becomes the 14th pitcher to record 3000 strikeouts with a first-inning strikeout of Oakland's Nick Swisher. He is only the third pitcher to record his 3,000th strikeout with fewer than 1,000 walks.
- August 31 – Ryan Howard hits his 49th home run of the season in the Philadelphia Phillies' 6–5 10-inning loss at Washington, breaking Mike Schmidt's 1980 team record.

=== September ===
- September 2 – At Rangers Ballpark in Arlington, Kevin Kouzmanoff of the Cleveland Indians becomes the first player to hit a grand slam on the first pitch he sees. The shot comes off Edinson Vólquez of the Texas Rangers in the first inning of a 6–5 Indians victory.
- September 4 – Ramón Ortiz of the Nationals pitches 8 no-hit innings and hits his first career home run before an Aaron Miles hit breaks up the no-hit bid in the ninth inning. Washington tops St. Louis 4–1.
- September 6:
  - Rookie Aníbal Sánchez of the Marlins pitches the first no-hitter since May 18, 2004. He beats the Diamondbacks 2–0, ending one of the longest streaks without a no-hitter since the World War II era.
  - The Americas Olympic Qualifying tournament concludes. The USA and Cuba qualify for the baseball tournament at the Beijing 2008 Summer Olympics.
- September 12:
  - The Mets' 6–4 win over the Marlins mathematically eliminates the Atlanta Braves from winning the NL East, finally ending the Braves' record streak of consecutive division titles at 14.
  - At Yankee Stadium, Bobby Abreu bats in six runs in the first inning of the New York Yankees' 12–4 victory over the Tampa Bay Devil Rays. Johnny Damon leads off the bottom of the 9-run inning with a base hit, then steals second with Derek Jeter at bat; after Jeter eventually walks, Abreu follows with a three-run home run. Abreu concludes the scoring by clearing the bases with a double that scores Hideki Matsui, Melky Cabrera and Jeter. The six RBIs tie Gil McDougald's 55-year franchise record for most in one inning; McDougald had accomplished this mark as a rookie on May 6, 1951.
- September 18:
  - The New York Mets become the first team to clinch a playoff spot for the 2006 postseason by clinching the NL East with a 4–0 win over the Marlins.
  - Jeff Kent, J. D. Drew, Russell Martin, and Marlon Anderson of the Los Angeles Dodgers hit back-to-back-to-back-to-back home runs in the 9th inning to tie their game against the Padres (The last two were given up by closer Trevor Hoffman). It is only the fourth time in history that four players homer consecutively, and the first such occurrence in over forty years. (Nomar Garciaparra hit a walk-off home run in the 10th inning)
- September 20:
  - Dontrelle Willis of the Florida Marlins becomes the first pitcher in franchise history to hit a multiple-home run game in his 8 1/3-inning win over the New York Mets at Shea Stadium.
  - Despite a 3–2 loss in Toronto, the New York Yankees clinch their ninth straight AL East title when the Twins defeat the Red Sox 8–2.
- September 21 – David Ortiz hits his 51st home run, breaking the Red Sox single-season record set by Jimmie Foxx in 1938. Later in the game he hits his 52nd.
- September 22:
  - Alfonso Soriano hits his 40th double, and becomes the first person to reach 40 home runs, 40 stolen bases and 40 doubles all in one season. Six days earlier, he stole his 40th base, to become the fourth player to join the 40–40 Club joining José Canseco, Barry Bonds, and Alex Rodriguez.
  - At Petco Park, Chris Young has what would have been the first no-hitter in San Diego Padre history broken up in the ninth inning of a 6–2 Padre victory over the Pittsburgh Pirates. Joe Randa hits a two-run home run with one out in the ninth, the only hit Young will allow.
- September 23 – Barry Bonds hits his 734th home run, breaking the NL record set by Hank Aaron. He still trails Aaron in total career home runs.
- September 24:
  - The Detroit Tigers beat the Royals on the road by a score of 11–4 to clinch a spot in the postseason for the first time since 1987.
  - Padres closer Trevor Hoffman records his 479th career save, breaking the record held by Lee Smith since 1993.
- September 25 – The Minnesota Twins beat the Royals by a score of 8–1 to clinch a spot in the playoffs for the fourth time in five seasons. Incidentally, the Royals are witness to opposing teams' celebrations in consecutive games after watching the Tigers clinch against them the previous day.
- September 26 – A 12–3 victory by the Oakland Athletics in Seattle coupled with a loss by the Angels gives Oakland its first AL West title and playoff spot since 2003.
- September 27 – Aníbal Sánchez recorded his tenth win of the year for the Marlins, joining Josh Johnson, Scott Olsen, and Ricky Nolasco to give the Marlins four rookie pitchers with ten or more wins, the first such occurrence in major-league history. With Dontrelle Willis' win total, this also marked Florida's first set of five ten-game winners.
- September 30 – Both the Los Angeles Dodgers and San Diego Padres clinch playoff berths by winning their respective games.

=== October–December ===
- October 1:
  - A loss by the Astros on the season's final day allows the St. Louis Cardinals to clinch their third straight National League Central title, despite St. Louis losing nine of their last twelve games after leading the division by seven games.
  - The Detroit Tigers' fifth consecutive loss allows the Minnesota Twins to overtake them for the American League Central title. No other team has ever won the division on the season's last day without ever leading at any other point during the season. The Tigers earn the Wild Card berth instead.
  - Though both teams win their final games to finish with identical records, the San Diego Padres win the National League West by virtue of a tiebreaker, and the Los Angeles Dodgers become the Wild Card qualifier.
  - Joe Mauer of the Twins becomes the first catcher to win the AL batting championship, with a .347 average.
  - The Toronto Blue Jays defeat the New York Yankees 7–5 to finish with a final record of 87–75, good enough for second place in the American League East. Up until this point, the Yankees and Boston Red Sox had finished 1–2 in the AL East each year since 1998.
  - Corendon Kinheim claims the 2006 Holland Series title after winning the fifth and final match 13–5. Kinheim was trailing opponents Konica Minolta Pioniers 1–0 and 2–1 in the best-of-five series, but managed to come back twice and clinch the victory at home, ending a seven-year reign by Neptunus.
- October 3 – Frank Thomas, 38, becomes the oldest player to have a multi-homer game in the postseason, hitting two home runs to lead the Athletics past the Twins by a score of 3–2 in Game 1 of the AL Division Series. Additionally, he becomes the player to go the longest between postseason home runs, having spanned 13 years since his previous postseason home run with the White Sox in 1993.
- October 6 – The Oakland Athletics complete a three-game sweep of the Minnesota Twins in the ALDS, ending a run of six consecutive postseason series defeats.
- October 7:
  - The Detroit Tigers defeat the New York Yankees winning the ALDS three games to one. The Yankees have now lost three consecutive postseason series.
  - The New York Mets complete a three-game sweep of the Los Angeles Dodgers in the NLDS despite losing two of their top starting pitchers to injury less than a week before the start of the postseason.
- October 8 – The St. Louis Cardinals defeat the San Diego Padres, winning the NLDS three games to one and reaching the NLCS for the third consecutive season.
- October 11 – Days after his Yankees are eliminated from the baseball postseason, pitcher Cory Lidle is killed when the plane he is piloting crashes into a Manhattan apartment building.
- October 14 – The Detroit Tigers complete a 4-game sweep of the Oakland Athletics and head to the World Series for the first time since 1984. Detroit's Magglio Ordóñez hits a three-run walk-off home run in the bottom of the ninth of Game 4 for the win and the AL pennant.
- October 19 – The St. Louis Cardinals clinch the National League pennant, defeating the New York Mets four games to three. Yadier Molina's two-run home run in the top of ninth inning ends a heart-rending seven-game series. The Cardinals, returning to the World Series after last appearing in 2004, will face the Detroit Tigers in the World Series; a rematch of the 1934 and 1968 series.
- October 26 – The Hokkaido Nippon Ham Fighters win their fourth straight game over the Chunichi Dragons, winning the Japan Series 4–1.
- October 27 – The St. Louis Cardinals defeat the Detroit Tigers 4–2, winning the World Series 4–1 for their 10th championship and their first since 1982. Their 83 regular-season victories is a new record for the fewest by a Series champion in a full season.
- November 2 – The 2006 American Gold Glove Awards were announced: Pitcher Kenny Rogers of Detroit Tigers, Catcher Ivan Rodriguez of Detroit Tigers, first base Mark Teixeira of Texas Rangers, second base Mark Grudzielanek of Kansas City Royals, third base Eric Chavez of Oakland Athletics, shortstop Derek Jeter of New York Yankees, outfielders Vernon Wells of Toronto Blue Jays, Ichiro Suzuki of Seattle Mariners and Torii Hunter of Minnesota Twins.
- November 15 – The Boston Red Sox file the highest bid, US$51.1 million, in the posting system and win the rights to negotiate with Seibu Lions pitcher Daisuke Matsuzaka. Matsuzaka has a gyroball among his arsenal of pitches and, while playing for champions Japan, was MVP at the 2006 World Baseball Classic.
- November 19 – The Chicago Cubs reportedly sign free agent Outfielder/Second Baseman Alfonso Soriano to an 8-year, $136 million deal. The signing is the largest in Cubs' history.
- December 13 – The Boston Red Sox and Daisuke Matsuzaka agree to a six-year, US$51.11 million contract, just ahead of the one-month deadline following the Red Sox' winning bid for the Japanese pitcher in the international posting system.
- December 26 – The Israel Baseball League reveals the names of the six inaugural teams: Bet Shemesh Blue Sox, Haifa Stingrays, Jerusalem Lions, Netanya Tigers, Petach Tikva Pioneers, Tel Aviv Lightning
- December 29 – The San Francisco Giants announce the signing of much sought-after lefty Barry Zito. The seven-year, $126 million contract is the largest ever for a pitcher, and includes a club option for 2014.

== Movies ==
- The Benchwarmers
- Everyone's Hero

== Births ==
=== April ===
- April 24 – Konnor Griffin

=== June ===
- June 1 – Ethan Salas

== Deaths ==
=== January ===
- January 1 – Paul Lindblad, 64, relief pitcher for the Kansas City/Oakland Athletics and two other American League clubs (1965 to 1978) who retired with 655 pitching appearances for the seventh most among left-handers; two-time World Series champion.
- January 5 – Rod Dedeaux, 91, baseball coach at the University of Southern California from 1942 to 1986 who won a record 11 College World Series titles, twice as many as any other coach, and 1,332 games, a record until 1994; played major role in baseball's acceptance in the Olympics, and coached the U.S. team in 1964 and 1984.
- January 8 – Merv Connors, 91, corner infielder for the Chicago White Sox in 1937 and 1938; hit 3 home runs in one game September 19, 1938; hit more than 400 home runs while playing in more than 2,100 minor league games from 1934 to 1953.
- January 14 – Wycliffe "Bubba" Morton, 74, right fielder, mainly with the Tigers, Angels and Japanese Toei Flyers, who in 1972 became the first black head coach in any sport at the University of Washington.
- January 16 – Willie Smith, 66, converted left-handed pitcher who played primarily as a left fielder for the California Angels, Chicago Cubs and three other MLB clubs (1963 to 1971), then Japan's Nankai Hawks (1972–1973).
- January 16 – Bob Repass, 88, reserve infielder for the St. Louis Cardinals (1939) and Washington Senators (1942).
- January 17 – Seth Morehead, 71, relief pitcher for the Philadelphia Phillies, Chicago Cubs, and Milwaukee Braves between 1957 and 1961.
- January 24 – Carlos (Café) Martínez, 41, infielder for three AL teams who batted .300 for the 1989 White Sox.
- January 28 – Frank Campos, 81, Cuban-born outfielder for the Washington Senators from 1951 to 1953.

=== February ===
- February 1 – "Whistling" Jake Wade, 93, pitcher for six AL teams who had been the oldest living Chicago White Sox player; brother of Ben Wade.
- February 4 – Joe McGuff, 79, sportswriter and editor for The Kansas City Star from 1948 to 1992 who covered the Athletics and later the Royals, playing an instrumental role in the latter franchise being awarded in 1969 and retained in the 1990s.
- February 9 – Motoshi Fujita, 74, Hall of Fame NPB pitcher played for the Yomiuri Giants from 1957 to 1964, managed the Giants and Taiyo Whales from 1963 to 1976.
- February 11 – Robert W. Peterson, 80, author of the 1970 book Only the Ball Was White, which focused attention on the Negro leagues; member of the 2006 Hall of Fame committee responsible for electing Negro leaguers.
- February 17 – Gertrude Ganote, 86, All-American Girls Professional Baseball League player.
- February 19 – Bill Abernathie, 77, who appeared in a single MLB game, on September 19, 1952, as a relief pitcher and member of the Cleveland Indians.
- February 20 – Curt Gowdy, 86, broadcaster whose voice was the soundtrack of 13 World Series, 16 All-Star games, the Boston Red Sox from 1951 to 1965, then ten years as lead announcer on NBC Game of the Week; enshrined as a Ford C. Frick Award winner in the Baseball Hall of Fame.
- February 21 – Scott Breeden, 68, pitching coach of the 1986–1989 Cincinnati Reds; former minor-league hurler and longtime minor-league pitching instructor.
- February 21 – Mark Freeman, 75, pitcher for the New York Yankees, Kansas City Athletics and Chicago Cubs in 1959 and 1960.
- February 26 – Ace Adams, 95, All-Star pitcher (1943) who spent six seasons with the New York Giants (1941–1946); led the National League in saves in 1944 and 1945 and in games pitched for three straight years (1942–1944, inclusive).

=== March ===
- March 2 – Ernesto Aparicio, 95, Venezuelan professional manager, player and team's owner, who also trained dozens of teenage boys on an individual basis, including his nephew and Hall of Famer Luis Aparicio and player/manager Ozzie Guillén.
- March 6 – Kirby Puckett, 45, Hall of Fame center fielder for the Twins who batted .318 lifetime and won six Gold Gloves; 1989 batting champion; led AL in hits four times, total bases twice and RBI once; MVP of 1991 ALCS, his 11th-inning walk-off home run won Game 6 of the 1991 World Series.
- March 12 – William Metzig, 87, second baseman who appeared in five late-season games for the wartime 1944 Chicago White Sox.
- March 18 – Betty Jane Cornett, 73, infielder/pitcher who played from 1950 through 1952 in the All-American Girls Professional Baseball League.
- March 28 – Paul "Lefty" Minner, 82, pitcher for the Brooklyn Dodgers (1946, 1948, 1949) and Chicago Cubs (1950–1956); won 69 major league games; first player to pitch under artificial light in the World Series (1949)
- March 29 – Thornton Kipper, 77, a standout pitcher in college and an All-American in 1950, who also pitched for the Phillies from 1953 to 1955.

=== April ===
- April 1 – John Bissant, 92, outfielder in Negro league baseball from 1934 to 1947.
- April 3 – Royce Lint, 85, pitcher for the St. Louis Cardinals in 1954; won 154 games in 15 seasons in the minor leagues
- April 9 – Billy Hitchcock, 89, infielder who appeared in 703 for five AL teams between 1942 and 1953; managed Baltimore Orioles (1962–1963) and Atlanta Braves (1966–1967); later, a minor league executive.
- April 9 – Jimmy Outlaw, 93, outfielder and third baseman, primarily for the Detroit Tigers, who was the left fielder on the 1945 World Series champions.
- April 13 – Bill Baker, 95, backup catcher for three National League clubs who appeared in 263 games over seven seasons between 1940 and 1949; member of 1940 World Series champion Cincinnati Reds; later an MLB coach (1950) and NL umpire (1957).
- April 16 – Lorraine Borg, 82, catcher for the Minneapolis Millerettes of the All-American Girls Professional Baseball League.
- April 19 – Oscar Acosta, 49, Latin American coordinator for the Yankees and manager of their Gulf Coast League franchise; former pitching coach for the Cubs and Rangers.
- April 24 – Sebastian "Sibby" Sisti, 85, infielder who spent 13 seasons with the Boston and Milwaukee Braves (1939–1942 and 1946–1954), and also appeared in the film The Natural.
- April 26 – Billy Queen, 77, outfielder for the 1954 Milwaukee Braves.
- April 26 – Russ Swan, 42, relief pitcher from 1989 to 1994, primarily for the Seattle Mariners.
- April 28 – Steve Howe, 48, All-Star relief pitcher, mainly with the Dodgers and Yankees, who was the 1980 NL Rookie of the Year but was suspended from baseball seven times and eventually barred from the sport due to drug abuse.
- April 30 – Dave Bartosch, 89, outfielder for the Cardinals in 1945; long-time scout for the Cardinals and Padres.

=== May ===
- May 4 – Jim Delsing, 80, outfielder for five AL teams best remembered as the pinch runner for Eddie Gaedel.
- May 7 – Jeff "Jesse" James, 64, pitcher for the Phillies in 1968 and 1969.
- May 9 – Betty Wagoner, 75, All-Star outfielder and a member of two championship teams of the AAGPBL.
- May 14 – Jim Lemon, 78, outfielder for four MLB teams, principally the Washington Senators/Minnesota Twins, between 1950 and 1963; led American League in triples in 1956, had two seasons of 30 HR and 100 RBI, and selected a 1960 AL All-Star; manager of 1968 "expansion" Senators, and also a longtime coach and instructor for the Twins.

=== June ===
- June 4 – Bill Fleming, 92, pitcher in 123 games for the Boston Red Sox (1940–1941) and Chicago Cubs (1942–1944 and 1946); led 1940 Pacific Coast League in strikeouts with Hollywood.
- June 4 – Ron Jones, 41, outfielder for the Phillies from 1988 to 1991.
- June 5 – Eric Gregg, 55, NL umpire from 1975 to 1999 who worked in the 1989 World Series and four NLCS, noted for weight problems and a wide strike zone.
- June 10 – Moe Drabowsky, 70, Polish-American relief pitcher for several teams from 1955 to 1972 who won Game 1 of the 1966 World Series with the Orioles.
- June 10 – Charles Johnson, 96, pitcher and outfielder for the Negro league Chicago American Giants; worked to push Major League Baseball to offer former Negro league players pensions.
- June 20 – Billy "Bull" Johnson, 87, All-Star third baseman for the Yankees (1943, 1946–1951) and Cardinals (1951–1953); played on four World Series Championship teams with the Yankees (1943, 1947, 1949, 1950); finished fourth in league MVP balloting his rookie year (1943).
- June 22 – Paul Campbell, 88, first baseman 204 career games for the Boston Red Sox (1941–1942, 1946) and Detroit Tigers (1948–1950); and later a scout and traveling secretary of the Cincinnati Reds.
- June 23 – Leo Wells, 88, third baseman and shortstop for the White Sox in 1942 and 1946.
- June 24 – Albert Zachary, 92, pitched in four games for the Brooklyn Dodgers in 1944.
- June 26 – Jack Urban, 77, pitcher for the Athletics (1957–1958) and Cardinals (1959); traded to Kansas City by the Yankees in 1957 in the deal that brought Art Ditmar and Clete Boyer to New York
- June 27 – Margaret Russo, 74, All-Star shortstop in the All-American Girls Professional Baseball League.
- June 29 – Curly Clement, 86, longtime Cape Cod Baseball League umpire who officiated two games as a replacement arbiter in the American League for one game in 1978 and another in 1979.

=== July ===
- July 4 – Chet Hajduk, 87, pinch hitter for Chicago White Sox who grounded out in his only MLB at bat on April 16, 1941, against Cleveland's Al Milnar.
- July 4 – Marilyn Olinger, 78, slick-fielding shortstop who played from 1948 through 1953 in the All-American Girls Professional Baseball League.
- July 11 – Phyllis Baker, 69, All-American Girls Professional Baseball League pitcher.
- July 15 – Howdy Groskloss, 100, second baseman for the Pirates from 1930 through 1932, at the time of his death, the oldest living major league player.
- July 17 – Barbara Liebrich, 83, player/manager during seven seasons in the All-American Girls Professional Baseball League.
- July 31 – Emilio Cueche, 78, one of the most prolific pitchers in Venezuelan baseball history and member of one Hall of Fame, who also played in Minor league baseball and in the Dominican Republic and Mexico baseball circuits.

=== August ===
- August 4 – Elden Auker, 95, submarine pitcher who won 130 games, mainly with Tigers and Browns; led AL in winning percentage for 1935 Detroit champions.
- August 8 – Dino Restelli, 81, outfielder for the Pirates in 1949 and 1951.
- August 12 – Earl Wooten, 82, outfielder for the Senators in 1947 and 1948.
- August 24 – Gene Thompson, 89, pitcher for the Cincinnati Reds and New York Giants who later spent 40 years as a scout; was 13–5 as rookie for 1939 NL champion Reds.
- August 30 – Charlie Wagner, 93, pitcher who won 32 games for the Boston Red Sox from 1938 to 1946; later an executive, scout, MLB pitching coach and minor league instructor; spent 73 years in Red Sox organization.

=== September ===
- September 1 – Ted Davidson, 66, pitcher for the Reds (1965–1968) and Braves (1968).
- September 2 – Victor Bernal, 52, pitcher for the Padres in 1977.
- September 7 – Gordie Mueller, 83, pitcher for the 1950 Boston Red Sox.
- September 17 – Jack Banta, 81, pitcher for the Brooklyn Dodgers from 1947 to 1950 who won the 1949 pennant-clincher.
- September 18 – Syd Thrift, 77, general manager of the Pirates (1985–1988), Yankees (1989) and Orioles (1999–2002); also a longtime scout.
- September 27 – Geraldine Guest, 83, All-American Girls Professional Baseball League player.
- September 27 – Joe Koppe, 75, shortstop for the Milwaukee Braves (1958), Philadelphia Phillies (1959–1961) and Los Angeles Angels (1961–1965).
- September 27 – Craig Kusick, 57, first baseman for the Twins from 1973 to 1979; high school coach for 22 years.

=== October ===
- October 1 – Anna Kunkel, 74, All-American Girls Professional Baseball League player.
- October 2 – Clyde Vollmer, 85, outfielder for the Cincinnati Reds, Washington Senators and Boston Red Sox between 1942 and 1951.
- October 2 – Al Heist, 79, outfielder for the Chicago Cubs (1960–1961) and the Houston Colt 45s (1962); later a coach for Houston and San Diego.
- October 5 – Dick Wagner, 78, executive during Cincinnati's "Big Red Machine" dynasty of the early 1970s; general manager of Reds (1978–1983) and Houston Astros (1985–1987), where he helped build Houston's 1986 NL West champions.
- October 6 – Buck O'Neil, 94, first baseman and manager who won two Negro leagues batting titles and led the Kansas City Monarchs to two championships; became first black coach in the major leagues, and a goodwill ambassador for the sport in his later years.
- October 8 – Ivan Murrell, 63, Panamanian outfielder for the Houston Colt .45s/Astros, San Diego Padres and Atlanta Braves between 1963 and 1974.
- October 11 – Cory Lidle, 34, pitcher for the Yankees and six other major league teams since 1997, won 13 games for 2001 A's and 2005 Phillies.
- October 11 – Eddie Pellagrini, 88, infielder for five teams from 1946 to 1954; coached Boston College to three College World Series; homered in his first MLB at bat.
- October 12 – Johnny Callison, 67, All-Star outfielder (1962, 1964, 1965) for the Chicago White Sox, Philadelphia Phillies, Chicago Cubs and New York Yankees who won the 1964 All-Star Game for the National League with a three-run, walk-off home run; led NL in triples twice and assists four times.
- October 16 – Donna Cook, 78, pitcher and outfielder who played from 1946 through 1954 in the All-American Girls Professional Baseball League.
- October 16 – Tony Curry, 67, Bahamian outfielder for the Phillies and Indians who followed Andre Rodgers as the second native of his country to play in the major leagues.
- October 17 – Bob Adams, 95, pitcher for the Boston Red Sox in the 1925 season.
- October 25 – Edward F. Kenney, 85, who served as a Boston Red Sox farm system executive for over 40 years.
- October 26 – Fred Marsh, 82, infielder for four teams from 1951 to 1956.
- October 27 – Joe Niekro, 61, All-Star pitcher who won 221 games and was the Astros' all-time leader with 144 victories; brother of Phil Niekro and father of Lance Niekro.
- October 29 – Silas Simmons, 109 (or 111), Negro leagues player of the 1920s, believed to be the longest-lived professional baseball player in history.
- October 31 – Glenn "Rocky" Nelson, 81, first baseman for five teams between 1949 and 1961 who hit a home run for the Pirates in Game 7 of the 1960 World Series; legendary minor-league slugger.

=== November ===
- November 2 – Red Hayworth, 91, catcher for the 1944–1945 St. Louis Browns who played in every game of the 1944 World Series; later a coach and scout, spending 53 years in baseball; brother Ray was also a major league catcher
- November 4 – Helen Westerman, 80, Kenosha Comets catcher, one of the original members of the All-American Girls Professional Baseball League in its 1943 inaugural season
- November 7 – Buddy Kerr, 84, All-Star shortstop for the New York Giants and Boston Braves who played 68 consecutive errorless games over the 1946–47 seasons, then a major league record.
- November 7 – Johnny Sain, 89, All-Star pitcher who was the 1948 National League MVP runner-up for the pennant-winning Boston Braves; later a respected, outspoken pitching coach for six MLB clubs between 1959 and 1986 whose 1961–1962 Yankees' and 1968 Tigers' pitching staffs won World Series titles.
- November 9 – Garton del Savio, 92, shortstop who played four games for the 1943 Phillies.
- November 9 – Jimmie Armstead, 87, Negro leagues outfielder and pitcher from 1938 to 1949.
- November 14 – Pete Suder, 90, infielder who played 1,421 MLB games, all for the Philadelphia and Kansas City Athletics from 1941 to 1955; later worked as a scout and minor league manager.
- November 14 – Al Smith, 81, American League umpire from 1960 to 1964 who worked in 798 league games, the 1964 World Series, and All-Star games in 1961 and 1963.
- November 17 – Bo Schembechler, 77, Hall of Fame college football coach and president of the Detroit Tigers from 1990 to 1992, even though he was widely criticized for the firing of legendary Tigers radio announcer Ernie Harwell.
- November 19 – Willie Grace, 89, player on the Cleveland Buckeyes and Erie Sailors of the Negro leagues from 1942 to 1950.
- November 22 – Pat Dobson, 64, All-Star pitcher who won 20 games for the 1971 Orioles; later a scout and assistant to the general manager with the Giants.
- November 27 – Eddie Mayo, 96, second and third baseman, primarily for the Tigers, who finished second in the MVP vote to teammate Hal Newhouser on the 1945 World Series champions.
- November 28 – Sam Calderone, 80, reserve catcher for the New York Giants (1950 and 1953) and Milwaukee Braves (1954).
- November 29 – Pete Mikkelsen, 67, relief pitcher for five teams from 1964 to 1972 who had 7 wins and 12 saves as a rookie for pennant-winning Yankees.

=== December ===
- December 2 – Corinne Clark, 78, All-American Girls Professional Baseball League player.
- December 3 – Billy Klaus, 77, shortstop/third baseman for six teams, notably the Boston Red Sox, between 1952 and 1963.
- December 3 – Ernie Oravetz, 74, outfielder for the Washington Senators in 1955 and 1956.
- December 8 – José Uribe, 47, Dominican shortstop for the Giants who was a member of the 1987 division champions and 1989 NL pennant winners.
- December 9 – Mildred Warwick, 84, Canadian infielder and one of the original players to join the All-American Girls Professional Baseball League for its inaugural season in 1943.
- December 12 – Irv Hall, 88, middle infielder for the Philadelphia Athletics from 1943 to 1946; worked as a manager in the St. Louis Browns minor league system
- December 16 – Cecil Travis, 93, All-Star shortstop for the Washington Senators who batted .314 lifetime; led AL in hits in 1941 before missing four seasons in World War II.
- December 17 – Larry Sherry, 71, relief pitcher for the Dodgers, Tigers, Astros and Angels from 1958 to 1968; MVP of 1959 World Series, playing a key role bringing world title to his hometown Dodgers; later a pitching coach; brother of Norm Sherry.
- December 22 – Sam Chapman, 90, All-Star center fielder for the Philadelphia Athletics from 1938 to 1951; batted .322 in 1941, led AL in putouts four times.
- December 23 – Sol Carter, 98, pitcher for the 1931 Philadelphia Athletics who had been the fourth oldest living major league player.
- December 26 – Chris Brown, 45, All-Star third baseman who batted .317 for the 1986 Giants; also played for the Padres and Tigers during a 6-year career.
- December 31 – Marv Breeding, 72, second baseman for the Orioles, Senators and Dodgers between 1960 and 1963.
- December 31 – George Sisler Jr., 89, minor league player turned executive; briefly worked in Cardinals' front office in the late 1940s but notable for his lengthy tenure in the Triple-A International League; son of the Hall of Famer and brother of two big-leaguers.
