= Roel Koolen =

Dutch baseball player (born 1982)

- Second baseman
- Born: 20 April 1982 (age 44); Mierlo, Netherlands
- Bats: Right Throws: Right

Roel Koolen
Medal record

Men's baseball

Representing Netherlands

Intercontinental Cup
Silver medal – second place	2006 Taiwan	National team

Roel Christianus Godefridus Koolen (born April 20, 1982 in Mierlo, North Brabant, Netherlands) is a Dutch former baseball player who played for the Netherlands national team in the 2008 Summer Olympics and for several teams in the Honkbal Hoofdklasse from 1998 to 2008.

Koolen made his Hoofdklasse debut with Twins Oosterhout in 1998. He played for the Dutch junior national team in the 1999 and 2000 World Junior Championships. In 2000, Koolen moved to Neptunus and helped the Rotterdam team win the Holland Series in 2001, 2002, 2004, and 2005. (He was not on the team in 2003). In the 2004 playoffs, he was named the most valuable player.

In 2003 and 2004, Koolen played college baseball in the United States. He was 3-for-17 with 3 walks in 16 games for the 2003 VCU Rams. In 2004, he had a .210/.300/.290 slash line in 26 games.

Returning to the Netherlands exclusively in 2005, the 23-year-old hit .253/.345/.326 in 26 games for Neptunus and fielded .889. He was 6-for-16 with three doubles in the Holland Series as the team won the title. After his move to Kinheim for the 2006 season, Koolen hit .324/.435/.426 with 27 walks in 42 games. He was fifth in the league in on-base percentage (OBP) and tied for fifth in walks. He hit .190/.292/.190 in the Holland Series as Kinheim won the title, breaking a long title run by Koolen's old club, Neptunus.

Koolen debuted for the Dutch national team in an exhibition game against Chinese Taipei in 2000, then did not appear again for his country until 2006. He batted 4-for-9 in three games in the 2006 Haarlem Baseball Week. He was 1-for-2 with a run and RBI as Michael Duursma's backup at second base in the 2006 Intercontinental Cup.

In 2007, Koolen hit .386/.525/.534 with 22 walks and 21 runs in 26 games. He lost the batting title by six points to Danny Rombley, was second to Fausto Alvarez in slugging percentage and led the league in OBP. He tied for second in the league with three triples. He batted 2-for-12 with a double in the 2007 Holland Series as Kinheim repeated. In the 2007 European Cup, Koolen was 4-for-20 with a double and a triple as Kinheim won the European club championship for the first time. He was 6-for-23 for the national team in the 2007 World Port Tournament. For the 2007 Baseball World Cup, Koolen replaced Yurendell de Caster at second base for the national team. Koolen started ahead of Duursma and hit .267/.267/.267 in 8 games as the Netherlands finished fourth, tying their best finish ever to that point.

Koolen hit .294/.409/.471 in the 2008 European Cup in Grosseto, Italy, to help Kinheim win the cup. In the seventh inning of the championship game, he tripled off Lincoln Mikkelsen and scored on a René Cremer sacrifice fly to tie the game against Grosseto, with Kinheim winning in 10 innings.

Manager Robert Eenhoorn selected Koolen for the Netherlands team at the 2008 Summer Olympics in Beijing. He batted 2-for-14 with six strikeouts and one error in five games as the Dutch finished seventh at the Olympics.

Koolen ended his playing career in December 2008 at the age of 26 to focus on his education and other work.
