= Kenny Berkenbosch =

Dutch baseball player (born 1985)

- Infielder / Pitcher
- Born: March 17, 1985 (age 41); Amsterdam, Netherlands
- Bats: Right Throws: Right
- Stats at Baseball Reference

Kenneth Berkenbosch (born March 17, 1985) is a Dutch former professional baseball infielder and pitcher who played for the Netherlands national team in the 2006 World Baseball Classic. He played in Minor League Baseball from 2002 to 2005 then played in the Honkbal Hoofdklasse, primarily for the Amsterdam Pirates.

== Career ==
Berkenbosch was signed at age 17 by the Florida Marlins and pitched in their system for several years. In 2002, he hit .333/.455/.444 in four games for the rookie-level Gulf Coast League Marlins. The next season, Kenny batted .244/.326/.291 in 43 games for the same team, playing regularly in the outfield.

In his third season with the GCL Marlins, Berkenbosch was moved to the mound and went 1-0 with a 1.64 earned run average (ERA), but a 4.09 RA in seven relief stints. In 2005, he moved up to the Jamestown Jammers and won one game and saved one in 17 outings. He had a 4.81 ERA, his primary problem being a tendency to give up home runs (7 in 33 2/3 innings).

In 2006, he was let go by Florida and signed with HCAW. He hit .292/~.386/.444 for the club as a 1B/OF/DH and went 2-3 with a 4.58 ERA on the mound. He was on the Netherlands roster for the 2006 World Baseball Classic but did not play in that event. He pitched one scoreless inning in the 2006 Intercontinental Cup.

Berkenbosch was 6-4 with a save and a 2.11 ERA in 2007 for the Amsterdam Pirates while batting .254/.324/.322. He hit .385/.385/.769 in the playoffs and was 0-1 with a 3.29 ERA. He was 8th in the 2007 Hoofdklasse in ERA, tied for 7th in wins and was 10th with 55 strikeouts.

Berkenbosch was 1-0 in the 2007 European Baseball Championship, allowing no runs and four baserunners in 7 innings while striking out 8 to help the Dutch team qualify for the 2008 Olympics. In the 2007 World Port Tournament, Berkenbosch had a 10.13 ERA, allowing three hits, three walks, one hit batsman and one wild pitch in 2 2/3 innings.

Berkenbosch was the first pitcher to face the Thai national team in a Baseball World Cup. He held them to two hits in six innings in Thailand's first game of the 2007 Baseball World Cup. He threw 3 1/3 scoreless innings for the relief win over the Venezuelan national baseball team later in the Cup. Overall, he allowed no runs and 3 hits in 10 1/3 innings in the event, leading the 4th-place Dutch team in ERA and wins.

Berkenbosch hit .309/.367/.509 in the 2008 Hoofdklasse, and posted a 10-2 record with a 2.24 ERA. He tied Leon Boyd for 2nd in wins, one behind Patrick Beljaards, was 9th in innings (76 1/3), 10th in strikeouts (49), tied for third in complete games (3), tied for the shutout lead (1) and was 9th in ERA, between Mihai Burlea and Diegomar Markwell. He won his only playoff game, then won his lone start in the 2008 Holland Series; he was 4-for-9 with a double, run and RBI in the Series as well as Amsterdam upset Corendon Kinheim. He started the winning rally in game one with a single off Michiel van Kampen and would come around to score, then beat Patrick Beljaards in game two.

Berkenbosch was on the provisional Dutch roster for the 2009 World Baseball Classic but did not make the final cut.

In the Nettuno phase of the 2009 European Baseball Cup, Kenny hit .308/.438/.385 and tossed three innings of one-run ball. In the Cup's Final Four, he was 1-for-6 with a double and surrendered two runs in two innings, including allowing the game-losing homer to Danny Rombley in the third / fourth place contest.
