= Chicho Jesurun =

Curaçaoan baseball player, coach, manager, and scout

- Coach / Manager / Scout
- Born: Arthur Benjamin Jesurun; 10 July 1947; Willemstad, Curaçao
- Died: 16 December 2006 (aged 59); Almere, Netherlands

Arthur Benjamin "Chicho" Jesurun (10 July 1947 – 16 December 2006) was a Netherlands-Antillian baseball player, coach, manager, and scout.

== Biography ==
During his playing career, Jesurun played for several teams, including the Korporaal Cardinals, a Curaçaoan team. He was one of the founders and players of the Caribe from Groningen in the Netherlands. In that period he also started his coaching career as a coach at the Rayon Het Noorden team.

In the 1970s and 1980s, Jesurun was working as a baseball coach in his native Curaçao with the Wildcats Felipe II and the Curaçao national baseball team. With this team he reached the second spot in the national league, before winning the league in three consecutive years. Later he also became an umpire in the sport.

Jesurun also worked as a scout for several teams, including the Atlanta Braves and the Florida Marlins of Major League Baseball. During his time with the Braves, he brought fellow Antillean Andruw Jones to the team. Besides Jones for the Braves, Jesurun contracted players like Vince Rooi, Danny Rombley, Tim van Pareren, Roger Bernadina (for the Expos), Rick Van den Hurk, Kenny Berkenbosch and Jeffrey de Vrieze (for the Marlins).

Other teams he managed were the Amsterdam Pirates and Almere '90. Jesurun also worked in other functions at Dutch clubs Pioniers and SV ADO. He also worked for Venezuelan professional team Los Tiburones de la Guairia, where he become an assistant to the owner.

The period in Amsterdam came after he worked for the Montreal Expos. The two teams became partners and the Pirates temporarily changed their name to the Amsterdam Expos, and were managed by Jesurun for four years.

At the time of his death, he was a bench coach at HCAW, a Dutch baseball club from Bussum.

In 1977, Jesurun got his start in radio, as a baseball commentator. Later he worked as a Papiamento language newsreader for Radio Netherlands Worldwide (Dutch: Radio Nederland Wereldomroep). During the 2005 Baseball World Cup, which was held in the Netherlands, he was featured as a reporter on the Dutch sport broadcasting program Langs de Lijn (Along the Line).

Jesurun died in 2006 at the age of 59 due to a heart attack.
