= Dirk van 't Klooster =

Dutch baseball player (born 1976)

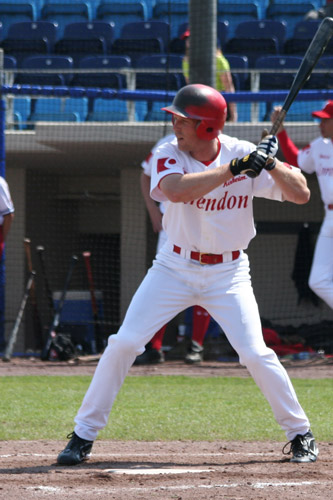
- van 't Klooster batting for Kinheim

Kinheim
- Outfielder / Coach
- Born: 23 April 1976 (age 50); Amsterdam, Netherlands
- Bats: Left Throws: Left
Medals
Men's baseball
Representing Netherlands
Intercontinental Cup
Silver medal – second place	2006 Taiwan	National team
European Baseball Championship
Gold medal – first place	1999 Italy	National team
Gold medal – first place	2001 Germany	National team
Gold medal – first place	2003 Netherlands	National team
Gold medal – first place	2007 Spain	National team
Silver medal – second place	2010 Germany	National team

Dirk Gijsbertus van 't Klooster (born 23 April 1976) is a Dutch baseball coach and former player. He is currently a coach for Kinheim in the Honkbal Hoofdklasse.

van 't Klooster played for the Netherlands national team at the 2000 Summer Olympics in Sydney where he and his team became fifth. Four years later at the 2004 Summer Olympics in Athens, they were sixth. At the 2008 Summer Olympics in Beijing, they were seventh.

van 't Klooster was also on the Dutch team for the 2006 and 2009 World Baseball Classic tournaments. He also competed in the Intercontinental Cup, Baseball World Cup, and European championships.

van 't Klooster debuted in the Hoofdklasse with Amsterdam Pirates, later playing for Quick Amersfoort, RCH-Pinguins, Neptunus, Kinheim, and Pioniers. He was named the best hitter in the league in 2002 and 2005. In 2011, he became the second player to have 1,000 hits in the Dutch league, joining Marcel Joost.

After ending his playing career in 2015, he became the hitting coach for DSS in the Hoofdklasse. He later coached Pioniers, playing briefly in 2022. He moved with manager Mervin Gario to coach Amsterdam in 2023 but left the team after the 2024 season. He joined Kinheim after the 2025 season.

== Personal life ==
van 't Klooster's father, Peter, and son, Koen, have also played baseball. Koen has pitched in college baseball and collegiate summer baseball.
