= 2021 Honkbal Hoofdklasse season =

- League: Honkbal Hoofdklasse
- Sport: Baseball
- Duration: April 29 – August 24

Regular season
- Season champions: Neptunus
- Season MVP: Denzel Richardson

League postseason

Holland Series
- Champions: L&D Amsterdam
- Runners-up: Neptunus

Seasons
- ← 2020 2022 →

The 2021 Honkbal Hoofdklasse season began on Thursday, April 29.

== Standings ==
Teams	W	L	T	Pct.	GB
Curacao Neptunus	34	8	0	.810	—
L&D Amsterdam	33	8	1	.798	½
HCAW	28	13	1	.679	5½
Twins Oosterhout	22	19	1	.536	11½
DSS/Kinheim	15	27	0	.357	19
Hoofddorp Pioniers	15	27	0	.357	19
Silicon Storks	12	29	1	.298	21½
Quick Amersfoort	7	35	0	.167	27
