= Patrick de Lange =

Dutch baseball player

- Pitcher
- Born: January 21, 1976 (age 50); Amsterdam, the Netherlands
- Bats: Right Throws: Right
Medals
Men's baseball
Representing Netherlands
European Baseball Championship
Silver medal – second place	1997 France	National team
Gold medal – first place	1999 Italy	National team
Gold medal – first place	2001 Germany	National team
Gold medal – first place	2003 Netherlands	National team

Patrick de Lange (born 21 January 1976) is a Dutch former baseball pitcher for the Netherlands national team in two Summer Olympics and in the Honkbal Hoofdklasse.

de Lange played for the Netherlands at the 2000 Summer Olympics in Sydney, where his team finished fifth. He started one game and appeared once in relief, with a 2.45 earned run average (ERA) in 7 1/3 innings. At the 2004 Summer Olympics in Athens, the Dutch were sixth. He had 1–1 record with a 3.24 ERA in 8 1/3 innings.

de Lange debuted with the national team at the 1997 European Baseball Championship, where the Dutch finished second. He was on the team for the next three continental championships, all of which were won by the Netherlands. He threw a shutout no-hitter against France in the Olympic qualifiers in 2003, allowing two walks and hitting a batter while another reached on an error by the catcher. de Lange struck out 11 Frenchmen, including the final three batters. He also pitched in the 1998 and 2003 Baseball World Cup, 2003 World Port Tournament, and 2004 Haarlem Baseball Week.

de Lange debuted in the top Dutch league, the Honkbal Hoofdklasse in 1997. He reportedly fielded contract offers from the New York Yankees and Montreal Expos, but turned them down to remain an amateur for the 2000 Olympics, which eventually allowed professional ballplayers to compete. He had the best winning percentage among Hoofdklasse pitchers in 1998. de Lange was the top pitcher in the Hoofdklasse in 2001 for HCAW, going 12–3 with a 0.96 ERA. He threw a no-hitter against Pioniers on June 3, striking out 8. However, following the season he suffered a shoulder injury. After attempting a comeback in 2002, he had an MRI that showed bone and cartilage damage. He began to rehab with national coach Charles Urbanus Jr.. de Lange moved to BSC Almere in 2004, returning to HCAW for one season in 2006 before finishing his Hoofdklasse career with Almere in 2007.
