= Judith van Kampen =

Dutch softball player (born 1978)

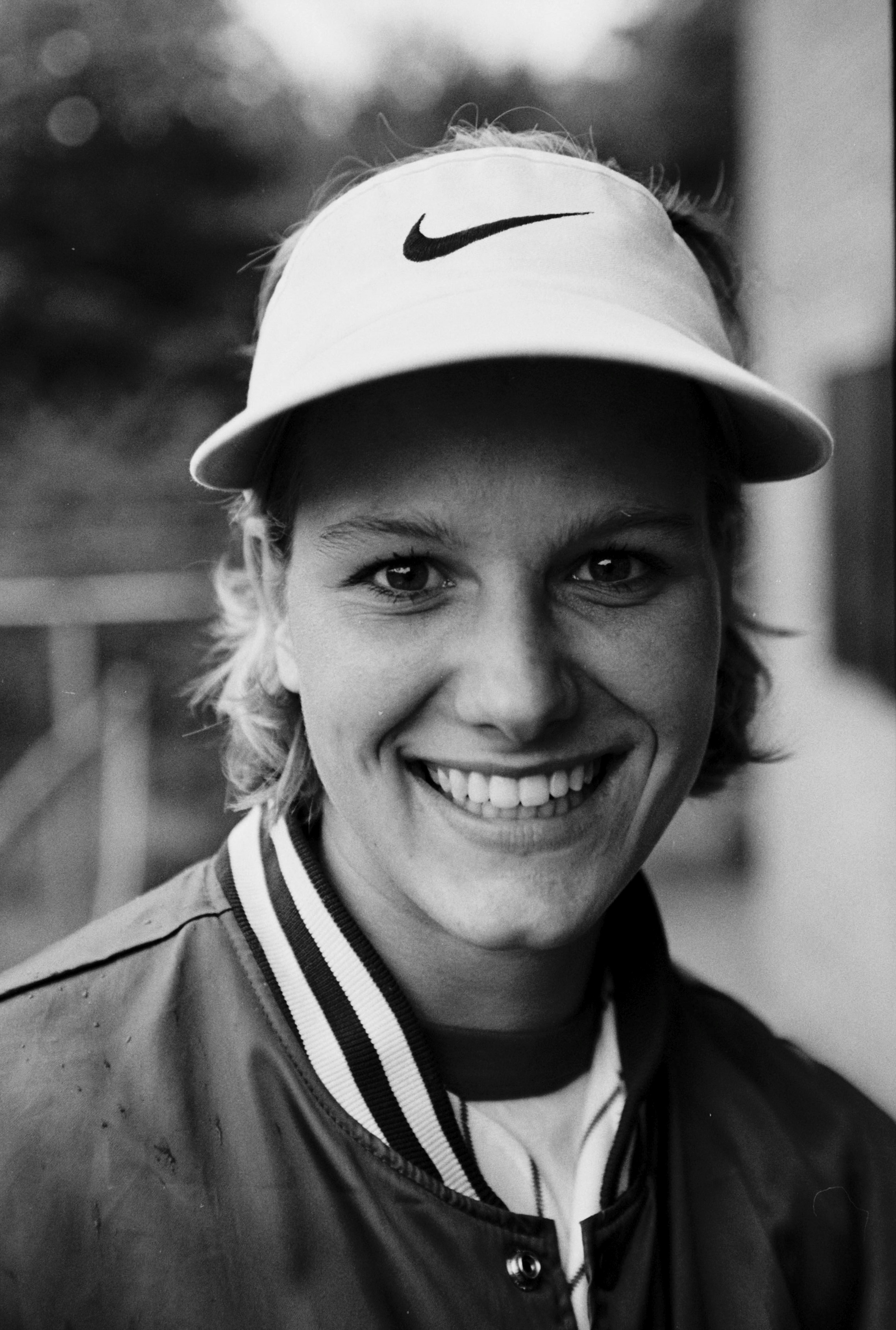
van Kampen (1997)

Judith van Kampen (born 21 December 1978 in Amsterdam) is a Dutch softball player, who represents the Dutch national team in international competitions.

Van Kampen played for Pioniers, HCAW, University of Nevada, Reno, Terrasvogels and since 2008 for Sparks Haarlem. She is a pitcher and throws right-handed. She competes for the Dutch national team since 2001. She is part of the Dutch team for the 2008 Summer Olympics in Beijing. Her brother Michiel van Kampen is a baseballer and also represented the Netherlands at the same Olympics.
