= DSS/Kinheim =

Dutch professional baseball team (2020–2024)

Information
- Location: Haarlem, the Netherlands
- Ballpark: Pim Mulier Stadium, 2,500 capacity
- Founded: 2020
- 2024: 15–33 (fourth place)
- Lost in playoff round to Neptunus
- Former league: Honkbal Hoofdklasse
- Manager: Etienne Meijer

DSS/Kinheim was a baseball team in Haarlem, the Netherlands that competed in the Honkbal Hoofdklasse. The team was a combination of two Haarlem sports clubs, DSS and Kinheim, which merged in 2020 after DSS had defeated Kinheim in a promotion/relegation playoff. DSS, however, faced financial difficulties staying in the top Dutch baseball league. Kinheim had won Dutch and European titles, but the club abruptly withdrew from the Hoofdklasse in 2016 and could not return to the top league via the promotion playoff.

The team played at Pim Mulier Stadium. DSS/Kinheim also fielded a combined second team that competes in the second-highest Dutch baseball league, the Eerste Klaase. Former Kinheim manager and Dutch national player Michael Crouwel was DSS/Kinheim's first manager. He was replaced by Etienne Meijer after the 2022 season.

The combined club played its first game on 23 July 20220, a 4–3 win over Hoofddorp Pioniers. The 2020 season was delayed and shortened due to the COVID-19 pandemic. The team scuffled in its first season, finishing in seventh place out of eight teams in the regular season. However, the team finished first in the "bottom four" pool.

In the 2021 season, DSS/Kinheim finished in fifth place and again won the "bottom four" pool. Outfielder Jason Jakobus tied for the league lead with four triples. The next season was a repeat, with the team again placing fifth in the regular season and winning the now-expanded "bottom five" pool in 2022. The team lost all five of its wildcard and placing round playoff games. Catcher Koen Halderman led the league with a .379 batting average and was in the top five in doubles, runs batted in, and on-base and slugging percentages. He won the league's Best Hitter award.

On 20 April 2023, three DSS/Kinheim pitchers combined for an eight-inning no-hitter in a 12–4 victory over RCH-Pinguins. The team finished the 2023 regular season in sixth place, followed by a second place finish in the "bottom five" pool and a 1–2 record in the bottom wildcard playoff. Catcher Sem Kuijper, who also played on the Netherlands' U23 baseball team, received the Guus van der Heijden Award as the best Dutch international player under the age of 23. Kuijper supplanted Halderman, who hit just .136 in the follow-up to his award-winning season and retired after the 2023 season.

In 2024, DSS/Kinheim advanced to the "top four" pool, finishing the first portion of the regular season in fourth place, three points clear of the lower pool. The club's first season in the "top four" pool went poorly, with 3 wins and 23 losses and a negative 113 run differential. In the wildcard playoff, the Haarlem team defeated the Oosterhout Twins, 2 games to 1, the combined franchise's first postseason series win. DSS/Kinheim had two extra-inning walk-off victories, with outfielder Colin Broers clinching the series with a single in the bottom of the 10th inning. DSS/Kinheim was swept in two games in the final four Playoff Round by Neptunus and failed to advance to the Holland Series. Ibrahin Redan, who pitched in the Cincinnati Reds minor league system a decade prior, led the team with a .322 average and .839 on-base plus slugging for the year. However, he and brother Irving Redan both ranked in the top three in the league in strikeouts.

In August 2024, DSS and Kinheim announced a change to their operating agreement beginning in 2025. Kinheim would field a team in the Hoofdklasse, and DSS would compete in the lower Eerste Klasse. The Royal Netherlands Baseball and Softball Federation (KNBSB), the national governing body for baseball, supported the change.
