= 2005 Holland Series =

The 2005 Holland Series was a series of baseball games held from September 24, 2005 to October 1, 2005 between the two Dutch play-off winners DOOR Neptunus and Mr. Cocker HCAW. The first team to have won three games in the best-of-five-games series became Dutch champions in this case, Door Neptunus with 3 shutout wins.

== Results ==
Game	Score	Date
1	DOOR Neptunus 0, @ Mr. Cocker HCAW 1	September 24
2	Mr. Cocker HCAW 0, @ DOOR Neptunus 7	September 25
3	DOOR Neptunus 5, @ Mr. Cocker HCAW 1	September 29
4	Mr. Cocker HCAW 0, @ DOOR Neptunus 3	October 1

Preceded by 2004 Holland Series	Holland Series	Succeeded by 2006 Holland Series
