= Rombley =

Rombley is a surname. Notable people with the surname include:

- Edsilia Rombley (born 1978), Dutch singer and television presenter
- Danny Rombley (born 1979), Dutch baseball player
