= Gary Van Tol =

American baseball coach and former player (born 1967)

Current position
- Title: Coach (assistant)
- Team: Arizona Complex League Reds

Biographical details
- Born: February 3, 1967 (age 59); Calgary, Alberta

Playing career
- 1986–1988: Treasure Valley Community College
- 1989–1990: Gonzaga

Coaching career (HC unless noted)
- 1991–1993: Gonzaga (assistant)
- 1994–1995: Centralia College
- 1996–1997: Treasure Valley Community College (assistant)
- 1997–2001: Treasure Valley Community College
- 2002–2005: Portland (assistant)
- 2006–2008: Gonzaga (assistant)
- 2009–2012: Boise Hawks (assistant)
- 2013–2014: Boise Hawks
- 2015: Eugene Emeralds
- 2016–2017: Eugene Emeralds (assistant)
- 2018–2020: Boise State
- 2021–2024: Boise Hawks
- 2025: Arizona Complex League Reds

Gary Van Tol (February 3, 1967) is an American baseball coach and former player who is a coach for the Arizona Complex League Reds. Van Tol played college baseball at Treasure Valley Community College from 1986 to 1988 before transferring to Gonzaga University where he played for coach Steve Hertz in 1989 and 1990. He served as the head coach at Centralia College from 1994 to 1995 and Treasure Valley Community College from 1997 to 2001. He was the coach of the minor league Boise Hawks in 2013 and 2014, the Eugene Emeralds in 2015, and became the head baseball coach at Boise State University in 2017, first helming a team in 2020. After that team disbanded that year, he returned to coach the Boise Hawks in 2021, now an independent team.

== Playing career ==
Van Tol enrolled at Treasure Valley Community College in Ontario, Oregon, and played baseball for the Chukars. After earning an associate degree from TVCC, he transferred to Gonzaga University in Spokane, Washington. As a senior in 1990, Van Tol was named first team All-Pac-10 Conference North Division.

Van Tol played for the Canadian national team from 1989 to 1991, playing at the 1990 Goodwill Games, 1990 Baseball World Cup, 1991 World Port Tournament, and 1991 Pan-Am Games, where the team failed to qualify for the 1992 Olympics.

After playing in the Dutch World Port Tournament, Van Tol was a player-coach for Neptunus in 1992 and 1993, winning the Holland Series in 1993.

== Coaching career ==
Van Tol was an assistant coach with Gonzaga from 1991 to 1993. He then coached at Centralia College before returning to Treasure Valley Community College, as an assistant in 1996 then as a head coach. In 1996, he was also an assistant for the Great Britain national team. He was an assistant coach for the Class A Short Season Boise Hawks in 2001 and 2002. He then became the pitching coach and recruiting coordinator for the University of Portland Pilots. On October 6, 2005, Van Tol returned to Gonzaga as an assistant coach. He returned to the Boise Hawks in 2008.

The Chicago Cubs named Van Tol the manager of the Hawks ahead of the 2013 season. He then became the manager of the Eugene Emeralds when the Cubs switched minor league affiliates in 2015, before being an assistant coach for the team in 2016 and 2017.

On November 27, 2017, Van Tol was named the head baseball coach at Boise State University. He was the first coach the Broncos have had since 1980, when the school disbanded the program. Van Tol had two years to prepare before the Broncos began play in 2020. However, the team played only 14 games, going 9–5, before the 2020 season ended early due to the COVID-19 pandemic. In July, the university eliminated its baseball program to reduce expenses.

In 2021, Van Tol became the coach of the Boise Hawks, which were now in the independent Pioneer League. The team declined to pick up his option after the 2024 season. He joined the Arizona Complex League Reds for the 2025 season.

== Head coaching record ==
Record table
Season	Team	Overall	Conference	Standing	Postseason
Boise State Broncos (Mountain West Conference) (2020)
2020	Boise State	9–5	0–0		Season canceled due to COVID-19
Boise State:		9–5	0–0		
Total:		9–5			
National champion Postseason invitational champion Conference regular season champion Conference regular season and conference tournament champion Division regular season champion Division regular season and conference tournament champion Conference tournament champion

== Personal life ==
Van Tol and his wife have four children. His wife worked in the Boise State athletics department. In 2015, his oldest son was a batboy for the Eugene Emeralds while his wife and other children lived in Boise.

As a child, Van Tol also played hockey. He was the Alberta Junior Hockey League Rookie of the Year in 1985.
