= Danny Rombley =

Dutch baseball player and coach (born 1979)

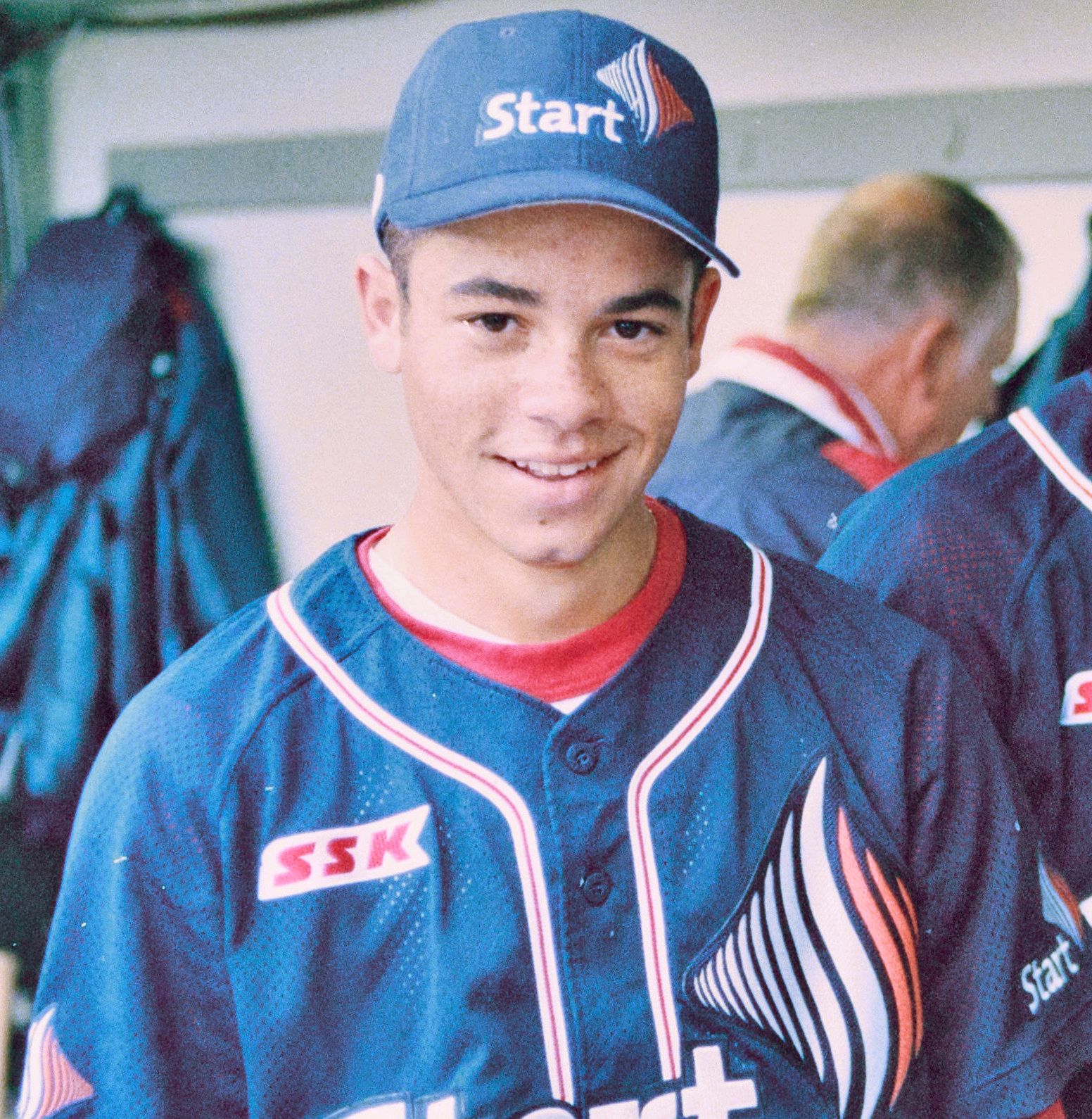
- Rombley in 1998
- Outfielder
- Born: 26 November 1979 (age 46); Amersfoort, Netherlands
- Bats: Right Throws: Right
- Stats at Baseball Reference
Medals
Men's baseball
Representing Netherlands
Baseball World Cup
Gold medal – first place	2011 Panama City	National team
Intercontinental Cup
Silver medal – second place	2006 Taichung	National team
Silver medal – second place	2010 Taichung	National team
European Baseball Championship
Gold medal – first place	2003 Netherlands	National team
Gold medal – first place	2005 Prague	National team
Gold medal – first place	2007 Montjuïc	National team
Silver medal – second place	2010 Stuttgart	National team
Gold medal – first place	2014 Brno	National team
France International Baseball Tournament
Gold medal – first place	2014 Sénart	National team

Danny Reginald Rombley (born 26 November 1979) is a Dutch former professional baseball player and manager. He played six years in Minor League Baseball and for the Netherlands national team in the 2006 and 2009 World Baseball Classic and 2008 Summer Olympics. He was also on the Dutch team that won the 2011 Baseball World Cup.

Rombley debuted with the national team in 1998. He was named the best left fielder of the 2005 European Baseball Championship and one of the best three outfielders of the 2005 Baseball World Cup. He was named the most valuable player of the 2010 Haarlem Baseball Week. He also played for the Dutch in the 2014 France International Baseball Tournament and 2014 European championship. He last played for the national team in the 2015 World Port Tournament.

After ending his American minor league career in 2004, he played in the Honkbal Hoofdklasse until 2017. He won the Holland Series in 2006 with Kinheim and led the league with a .320 batting average in 2007. He was the league MVP in his final season.

Rombley managed HCAW in the Hoofdklasse in 2022, when he won the Holland Series, and 2023.
