= 2006 Holland Series =

The 2006 Holland Series were held from 21 September to 1 October 2006 between the two Dutch play-off winners Corendon Kinheim and Konica Minolta Pioniers. The first team to win 3 games in the best-of-five-games series would become Dutch champions. Konica Minolta Pioniers took a 1-0 and 2–1 lead, but with only one more win needed they lost the remaining matches, resulting in a 3-2 Kinheim championship.

== The end of Neptunus hegemony ==
Rotterdam based defending champions DOOR Neptunus won the Holland Series for seven consecutive years, but found themselves beaten in 2006 during the play-offs by Konica Minolta Pioniers, third placed in the regular season. Since 2001 all Holland Series were decided in a clash between Neptunus and Bussum based Mr. Cocker HCAW. 2006 is the first season since 1992 that neither Neptunus or HCAW are in the Holland Series.

== Kinheim and Pioniers ==
Kinheim's most successful period was in the 90s when they reached the Holland Series five consecutive times (1992–1996). They lost four of their Holland Series entries, but managed to become Dutch champions in 1994 when beating Neptunus 3–2. In 2006 Kinheim won the regular league, the Honkbal Hoofdklasse and the KNBSB-Beker, which is the national cup trophy.

Pioniers' entrance in the 2006 Holland Series is only the second time in the team's history. In 1997 they also were able to beat Neptunus in the play-offs to beat HCAW 3–2 in the Holland Series and to claim their first title.

Before the Holland Series started Kinheim could be seen as the big favourite. During the regular season both teams met each other six times. Six out of six matches Kinheim left the pitch as winners, even claiming a 17–0 victory on 20 May. In total Kinheim scored 48 runs, while Pioniers were only able to hit 11 runs.

== Results ==
Game	Score	Date
1	Konica Minolta Pioniers 10, @ Corendon Kinheim 5	21 September
2	Corendon Kinheim 6, @ Konica Minolta Pioniers 1	23 September
3	Konica Minolta Pioniers 7, @ Corendon Kinheim 4	24 September
4	Corendon Kinheim 6, @ Konica Minolta Pioniers 5	30 September
5	Konica Minolta Pioniers 5, @ Corendon Kinheim 13	1 October

=== Match 1: Corendon Kinheim - Konica Minolta Pioniers 5-10 ===
As being the favourites Kinheim started the Holland Series strongly with full loaded bases in the 1st and 2nd innings. Pioniers avoided getting behind early in the game by two crucial doubleplays. In total Kinheim produced 14 hits, which was two hits more than Pioniers achieved. Still Pioniers managed to score 10 runs in the last six innings of the match to claim a 10–5 victory and a 1-0 Holland Series lead.

Teams	1	2	3	4	5	6	7	8	9	R	H	E
Konica Minolta Pioniers	0	0	0	1	2	1	3	1	2	10	12	1
Corendon Kinheim	0	0	1	1	0	0	0	0	3	5	14	3

=== Match 2: Konica Minolta Pioniers - Corendon Kinheim 1-6 ===
Where Kinheim was surprisingly beaten in the first match, they equaled the Holland Series in the second match. Kinheim succeeded mainly because of their strong attack during this match. After two innings without any runs they scored a total of five runs in the third inning. Pioniers was not able to react and close the gap. Only in the sixth inning, when Kinheim already scored their sixth run, Pioniers was able to hit a single run back, but could not do any more in the remaining innings.

Teams	1	2	3	4	5	6	7	8	9	R	H	E
Corendon Kinheim	0	0	5	0	0	1	0	0	0	6	13	1
Konica Minolta Pioniers	0	0	0	0	0	1	0	0	0	1	7	1

=== Match 3: Corendon Kinheim - Konica Minolta Pioniers 4-7 ===
The third match started off in the second inning when Pioniers scored an impressive five runs with Kinheim already in need to change their pitcher. Kinheim were able to hit one run back, but were chasing the visitors from the start. In the fourth inning the excitement returned when Kinheim scored three more runs, making the score 4–3 in Pioniers' advantage and fully loaded bases. The next hit however was caught and ending the inning. Pioniers then did not get into any more trouble and even managed to score two more runs themselves to win the match 7–4. Pioniers is excelling the series in defende, making eleven doubleplays and only making two errors in three matches.

Teams	1	2	3	4	5	6	7	8	9	R	H	E
Konica Minolta Pioniers	0	5	0	0	0	1	0	1	0	7	9	0
Corendon Kinheim	0	1	0	3	0	0	0	0	0	4	9	1

=== Match 4: Konica Minolta Pioniers - Corendon Kinheim 5-6 ===
In a close fourth match Kinheim managed themselves their second win, to claim a fifth match to decide the Holland Series. Kinheim balanced on the knock-out after being behind 5–2 in the fourth inning. Kinheim closed the gap in the sixth by a run, but were still trailing by two points until a three-run inning in the seventh, resulting in a 6–5 lead. Kinheim was able to keep the lead and win the match to get the series to 2–2.

Teams	1	2	3	4	5	6	7	8	9	R	H	E
Corendon Kinheim	0	2	0	0	0	1	3	0	0	6	15	3
Konica Minolta Pioniers	0	1	0	4	0	0	0	0	0	5	11	2

=== Match 5: Corendon Kinheim - Konica Minolta Pioniers 13-5 ===
Kinheim's win in the fourth match was good enough to claim a fifth and final match to decide which team could call themselves Dutch champions. Pioniers were slightly favourite, but only because all matches so far were won by the visiting team. It was no surprise the first run was scored by Pioniers taking a 1st inning lead. They expanded their lead in the second inning, but at the bottom of the 2nd Kinheim batted four runs in, resulting in a 4–2 lead. With Pioniers unable to score in the 3rd inning Kinheim had no problem scoring six runs, increasing their lead to 10–2. Pioniers fought back and hit an additional three runs in the 4th. At 10-5 the game was set on hold and no more runs were scored in the 5th, 6th and 7th inning. The match had to be suspended because of heavy rainfall for two hours. After the break Pioniers scored another three runs and then only had to struck out three more Pioniers batters to claim the title. With 2 men on the bases a fly-out in the 9th ended the match and the Series. Kinheim won their third Holland Series in the club's history.

Teams	1	2	3	4	5	6	7	8	9	R	H	E
Konica Minolta Pioniers	1	1	0	3	0	0	0	0	0	5	12	3
Corendon Kinheim	0	4	6	0	0	0	0	3	0	13	13	0

Preceded by 2005 Holland Series	Holland Series	Succeeded by 2007 Holland Series
