= 2008 Holland Series =

Professional baseball tournament in the Netherlands

Team (Wins)	Manager(s)	Season
Amsterdam Pirates (3)	Rikkert Faneyte	29–13, .690
Corendon Kinheim (0)	Ben Thijssen	32–10, .762
- Dates: 4–8 October
- Venue(s): Sportpark Ookmeer, Pim Mulier Stadium
- MVP: Ryan Murphy (Amsterdam)

The 2008 Holland Series involved the defending champions Corendon Kinheim being defeated by the Amsterdam Pirates in three straight games. The first two games were postponed due to heavy rainfall. It was the first championship for the Pirates since 1990, their second since the start of the Holland series, and their third title overall.

== Games ==
4 October 2008 – Kinheim at Amsterdam 3–4

7 October 2008 – Amsterdam at Haarlem 6–3

8 October 2008 – Amsterdam at Haarlem 12–0

Preceded by 2007 Holland Series	Holland Series	Succeeded by 2009 Holland Series
