= Honkbal Overgangsklasse =

Level of professional baseball in the Netherlands

- Sport: Baseball
- No. of teams: 12
- Country: Netherlands
- Most recent champion(s): UVV Utrecht
- Promotion to: Honkbal Hoofdklasse

The Honkbal Overgangsklasse (Dutch for Baseball Transition League) was the second highest level of professional baseball in the Netherlands. It was a twelve-team league that played a 22-game schedule followed by two separate 15-game schedules for the best six teams and the weakest six teams, and is overseen by the KNBSB. Games are played principally on weekends. The season ran from April to August and previously had a promotion and relegation system with the highest level of baseball in the Netherlands, the Honkbal Hoofdklasse, so that the composition of the top level may change from year to year.

== 2011 season ==
The 2011 Honkbal Overgangsklasse season began 8 April.

=== 22-game schedule ===
Teams	W	L	Pct.	GB
Euro Stars	19	3	.864	—
RCH-Pinguïns	17	5	.773	2
PSV Eindhoven	16	6	.727	3
DSS Haarlem	15	6	.705	3½
Tex Town Tigers	14	8	.636	5
Mampaey The Hawks	13	8	.614	5½
Sparks Haarlem	11	11	.500	8
Twins Oosterhout	7	15	.318	12
Double Stars	6	16	.273	13
Robur '58	5	17	.227	14
The Orioles	5	17	.227	14
Almere Magpies	3	19	.136	16

=== 15-game schedule ===
==== Top six teams ====
The 2011 Honkbal Overgangsklasse 1–6 (best teams) season began on 25 June and ended on 4 September.

Teams	W	L	Pct.	GB
Euro Stars	9	3	.750	—
PSV Eindhoven	8	4	.667	1
RCH-Pinguïns	6	6	.500	3
Tex Town Tigers	5	7	.417	4
DSS Haarlem	4	7	.375	4½
Mampaey The Hawks	3	8	.292	5½

==== Bottom six teams ====
The 2011 Honkbal Overgangsklasse 7–12 (weakest teams) season began on 25 June and ended on 4 September.

Teams	W	L	Pct.	GB
Sparks Haarlem	9	3	.750	—
Twins Oosterhout	8	4	.667	1
Double Stars	6	5	.542	2½
Robur '58	5	6	.458	3½
Almere Magpies	4	8	.333	5
The Orioles	3	9	.250	6

== See also ==
- Baseball in the Netherlands
- Baseball awards § Netherlands
- Baseball awards § Europe
