= Treasure Valley Community College =

Public college in Ontario, Oregon, US

- Type: Public community college
- Established: 1962; 64 years ago
- Affiliations: NWAACC
- President: Dana Young
- Location: Ontario, Oregon, U.S. 44.0185°N 116.9732°W
- Nickname: Chukars
- Mascot: Chukar partridge
- Website: treasurevalleycc.edu

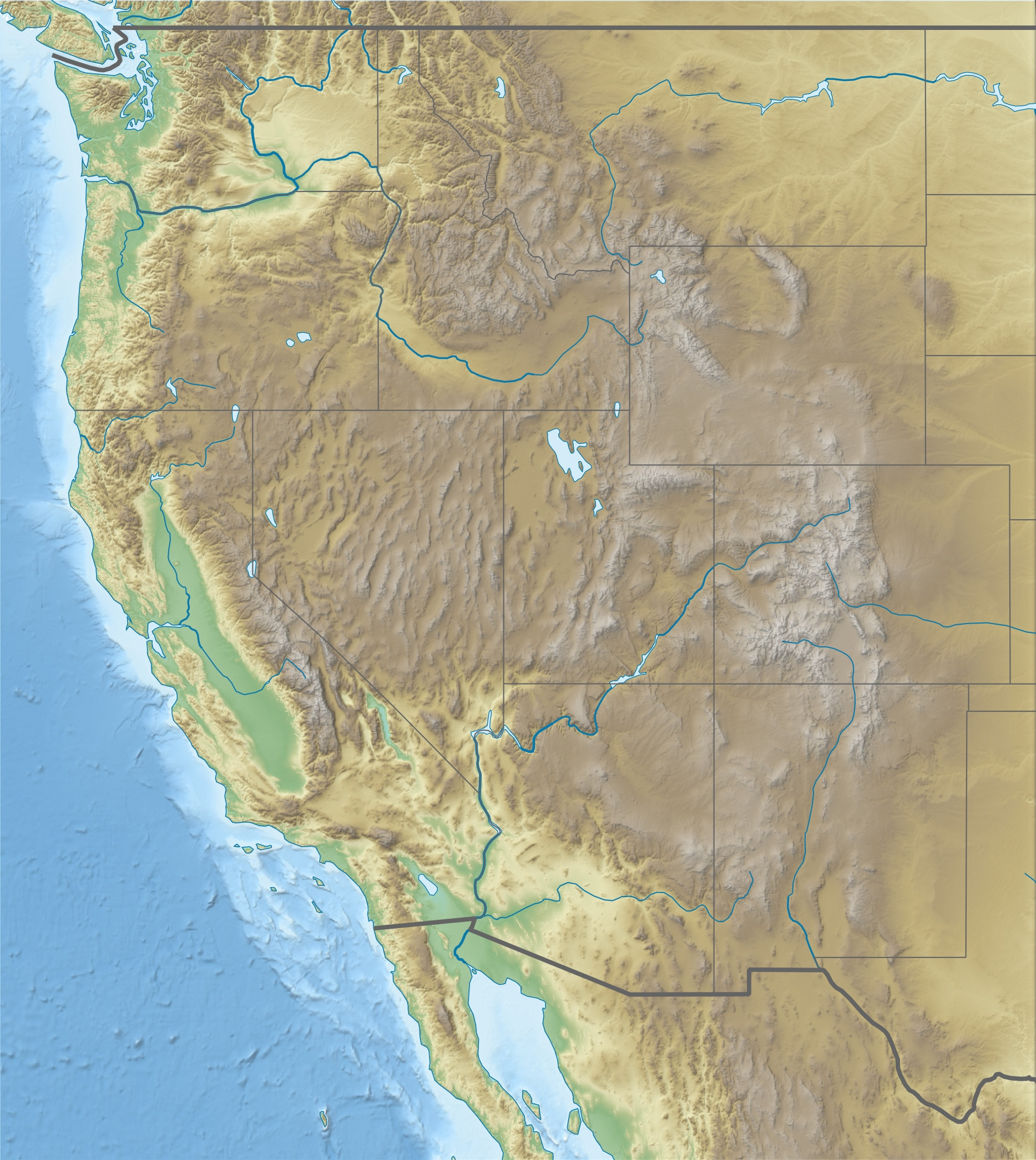
Location in the western United States
Location in Oregon

Treasure Valley Community College is a public community college in Ontario, Oregon, at the western edge of the Treasure Valley.

Its service area is sections of Malheur and Baker counties. Additionally Harney County and the city of Burns have "contract out of district"s (COD) with TVCC.

== History ==
Treasure Valley Community College opened 64 years ago in 1962 with afternoon and evening classes at Ontario High School. Since then, TVCC has grown to fourteen major buildings, including the Laura Moore Cunningham Science Center, which officially opened its doors in 2013 and the Florence Findley CTE building newly renovated in 2022.

== Campus ==
The rural campus in Ontario occupies 90 acres (36 ha) on the western edge of the Treasure Valley, which is primarily in southwestern Idaho. The nearby Four Rivers Cultural Center houses the Meyer-McLean theater used by the college to present plays and other purposes.

The Caldwell Center in Idaho is a satellite of TVCC and offers college preparation, college transfer, and professional-technical classes in a three-story building built in downtown Caldwell on the banks of Indian Creek. It offers a broad range of student services including advising, placement testing, registration, financial aid assistance, and career planning. Students also have access to tutorial support and student activities. Classes may be taken face-to-face, via interactive video conference with the Ontario campus, or on the web. Students may take classes at both the Caldwell Center and the Ontario campus.

== Organization and administration ==
TVCC leadership is composed of professionals in the western Treasure Valley. President Dana M. Young, the fifth president in college history, has led TVCC since July, 2010.

== Academics ==
The college serves approximately 6,000 students a year, 900 of them full-time. TVCC also provides outreach services in Harney County at the Burns Outreach Center, and Warner Creek Correctional Institution in Lakeview, as well as the Snake River Correctional Institution in Ontario.

== Student life ==
=== Chukar Entertainment ===
Chukar Entertainment is operated by the TVCC Student Activities team. Hosting a variety of events and activities throughout the academic school year, it puts on events such as "Star Wars Invades the Treasure Valley" and numerous musical guests and speakers such as Olympic boxer Marlen Esparza, Australian singer and actress Bonnie Piesse, and The Voice contestant Nelly's Echo.

=== Student government ===
The Associated Student Government (ASG) at TVCC is a diverse group of students who serve as a liaison between the administration and the student body.

=== Residence life ===
TVCC offers a residence hall for on-campus living in the Ontario campus. TVCC stated that it was uncommon for American community colleges to have residence halls.

== Athletics ==
TVCC is home to a competitive athletics program. The school mascot is the Chukar.

=== John J Easly Gymnasium ===
The John J. Easly Gymnasium beams with Chukar pride, and is home to the Treasure Valley CC Volleyball and Basketball teams. The building houses a full gym, locker rooms, cardio and weight rooms, an aerobic room, 2 full classrooms, athletic training room and offices for the athletic staff.

=== Elks Memorial Field ===
Elks Memorial Field is home to the Chukar Baseball team. The Elks Memorial Field is one of a number in the area.

=== Heinz/Ore-Ida Sports Complex ===
The Heinz/Ore-Ida Sports Complex is home to the Treasure Valley Community College Chukar Softball Team. With three full service softball fields the complex is a venue for local teams.

=== Tennis courts ===
The Treasure Valley Community College tennis teams have access to seven of their own tennis courts. The courts are used regularly by the community and local schools, and the men's tennis team won the NWAC regional championship in the 2013–14 season.

== Notable alumni ==
- Rick Bauer, professional baseball player
- Leon Boyd, player for the Netherlands National Baseball Team
- Jim Evenson, professional football player
- Lynn Findley, politician
- Jason Hammel, professional baseball player
- Lefty Hendrickson, professional football player
- Michiel van Kampen, player for the Netherlands National Baseball Team
- Jeff Lahti, professional baseball player (attended 1975–77)
- Wayne Nordhagen, professional baseball player
- Lenn Sakata, professional baseball player and manager

== See also ==
- KMBA-LP (television station owned by TVCC)
- List of Oregon community colleges
