= Curly Clement =

American baseball umpire (1919–2006)

- Born: July 19, 1919; Manchester, New Hampshire, U.S.
- Died: June 29, 2006 (aged 86); Hampton, New Hampshire, U.S.
- Occupation: Umpire
- Years active: 1978-1979
- Employer: American League

Robert F. "Curly" Clement (July 19, 1919 – June 29, 2006) was an American Major League Baseball umpire who worked briefly in the American League in 1978 and 1979. He was also a longtime NCAA and Cape Cod Baseball League umpire.

Clement worked two games as a replacement umpire in the American League. His first appearance was as third base umpire at Fenway Park for the game between the Boston Red Sox and California Angels on August 25, 1978, when major league umpires staged a one-day walk-out. His second and final appearance was as second base umpire at Fenway for the opening day game between the Red Sox and Cleveland Indians on April 5, 1979, during the 1979 Major League umpires strike. In the 1979 game, Clement called baseball Hall of Famer Carl Yastrzemski out on an attempted steal of second base.

Over his long NCAA career, Clement worked 12 ECAC baseball tournaments, 16 NCAA regional tournaments, and two College World Series. His career in the Cape Cod League began in the late 1960s, and lasted into the 2000s. A veteran of World War II, Clement was known for his charismatic and genial personality, and was often referred to as "the Candy Man" for his propensity to diffuse tense on-field situations by offering candy to players and coaches. Clement was inducted into the Cape Cod Baseball League Hall of Fame in 2002, and in 2004 the league established the Curly Clement Award to annually honor officiating excellence.
