= Charles Johnson (pitcher) =

American baseball player

- Pitcher
- Born: August 7, 1909; Pine Bluff, Arkansas, U.S.
- Died: June 17, 2006 (aged 96); Chicago, Illinois, U.S.

Teams
- Chicago American Giants

Charles Johnson (August 7, 1909 – June 17, 2006) was an American professional baseball player in the Negro leagues who later pushed Major League Baseball to offer pensions to former Negro league players.

Johnson also filed an anti-discrimination suit against Illinois Central Railroad in the mid-1960s after he was turned down for a special agent position. Johnson won the suit and became the first African American special agent.

Johnson was born in Pine Bluff, Arkansas. At 15 he and his mother moved to Chicago. His mother died shortly after the move, and Johnson—who was an only child—was left on his own.

Johnson had a friend, legendary Negro league player Ted "Double Duty" Radcliffe, who helped him get into the league. Johnny Washington, a former Negro league player and friend of Johnson, said: "Duty lived on the same block as Charlie and really took a liking to him."

Johnson spent his time in the Negro league barnstorming the United States and Canada. He went on a barnstorming tour of Canada with the Texas Giants in 1930 and 1931. Johnson returned to Chicago and served as pitcher and outfielder for the Chicago American Giants.

Johnson married in 1942 and, at his wife's insistence, quit baseball in 1944. Johnson worked at various jobs until he became a porter on the Illinois Central in 1951.

Johnson died of complications from prostate cancer. He is buried in Chicago's Oak Woods Cemetery.
