= John Bissant =

- Outfielder
- Born: February 19, 1914; New Orleans, Louisiana, U.S.
- Died: April 1, 2006 (aged 92); Houston, Texas, U.S.
- Batted: Right Threw: Right

Negro league baseball debut
- 1934, for the Chicago American Giants

Last appearance
- 1947, for the Chicago American Giants
- Stats at Baseball Reference

Teams
- Chicago American Giants (1934, 1939, 1942–1947); Shreveport Acme Giants (1935–1936); Cincinnati Tigers (1937); New Orleans Black Pelicans (1938); Birmingham Black Barons (1940); Chicago Brown Bombers (1942)

John Lawrence Bissant (February 19, 1914 – April 1, 2006) was an American professional baseball outfielder in the Negro leagues. He played from 1934 to 1947. Bissant played mostly for the Chicago American Giants, for whom he played for in 1934, 1939, and from 1942 to 1947.
