= 2007 European Cup (baseball) =

The 2007 European Cup was held in San Marino on June 12 to June 16. Kinheim Haarlem were the winners of the competition.

== Results ==
=== Group A ===
Team	W	L
Rimini (Italy)	3	0
Kinheim Haarlem (Netherlands)	2	1
Draci Brno (Czech Republic)	1	2
Solingen Alligators (Germany)	0	3

=== Group B ===
Team	W	L
San Marino (Italy)	2	1
Huskies de Rouen (France)	2	1
Grosseto (Italy)	2	1
Marlins Puerto Cruz (Spain)	0	3

== Finals ==
Semifinals:
Kinheim Haarlem (Netherlands) defeated San Marino (Italy) 7–0
Huskies de Rouen (France) defeated Rimini (Italy) 4–3

3rd Place:
Rimini (Italy) defeated San Marino (Italy) 1–9

Final:
Kinheim Haarlem (Netherlands) defeated Huskies de Rouen (France) 3–1
