= Quick Amersfoort =

Sports club

Quick Amersfoort or BSC Quick is a baseball and softball club based in Amersfoort, the Netherlands. Quick Amersfoort was established in 1961 by a group of football players looking for something to play in the summer months. The club has participated in the Honkbal Hoofdklasse since 2018. Quick Amersfoort currently numbers over 250 members and fields six youth baseball teams, three youth softball teams, three adult baseball teams, four adult men's softball teams, three adult women's softball teams, and one slow pitch team. The team plays its home games at XL Lease Park Dorrestein.
