= Holland Series =

Annual professional baseball championship in the Netherlands

Tournament information
- Sport: Baseball
- Month played: Late September–October
- Established: 1972
- Administrator: Honkbal Hoofdklasse
- Format: Best-of-seven series
- Teams: 2
- Defending champions: Neptunus (21st title)
- Most championships: Neptunus (21 titles)

The Holland Series is the annual championship series of the highest level of professional baseball in the Netherlands. It is the conclusion of the postseason of Honkbal Hoofdklasse, played between the two winners of the league's playoffs. The series was played for two years in the 1970s, then annually beginning in 1987.

The Holland Series championship is determined through a best-of-seven game playoff. Currently, six teams qualify for the playoffs, with the top two teams in the Hoofdklasse regular season earning a bye in the Wildcard round.

Neptunus in Rotterdam has won 21 Holland Series championships, more than any other Dutch club.

== Results ==
=== Champions ===
Year	Champions
2025	Neptunus Rotterdam
2024	Neptunus Rotterdam
2023	Amsterdam Pirates
2022	HCAW Bussum
2021	Amsterdam Pirates
2019	Amsterdam Pirates
2018	Neptunus Rotterdam
2017	Neptunus Rotterdam
2016	Neptunus Rotterdam
2015	Neptunus Rotterdam
2014	Neptunus Rotterdam
2013	Neptunus Rotterdam
2012	Kinheim Haarlem
2011	Amsterdam Pirates
2010	Neptunus Rotterdam
2009	Neptunus Rotterdam
2008	Amsterdam Pirates
2007	Kinheim Haarlem
2006	Kinheim Haarlem
2005	Neptunus Rotterdam
2004	Neptunus Rotterdam
2003	Neptunus Rotterdam
2002	Neptunus Rotterdam
2001	Neptunus Rotterdam
2000	Neptunus Rotterdam
1999	Neptunus Rotterdam
1998	Mr. Cocker HCAW
1997	Hoofddorp Pioniers
1996	Mr. Cocker HCAW
1995	Neptunus Rotterdam
1994	Kinheim Haarlem
1993	Neptunus Rotterdam
1992	ADO Den Haag
1991	Neptunus Rotterdam
1990	Amsterdam Pirates
1989	Haarlem Nicols
1988	Haarlem Nicols
1987	Amsterdam Pirates
1973	Sparta-Feyenoord
1972	Sparta-Feyenoord

=== Records ===
Holland Series Records
Rank	Team	Titles	First	Last
1st	Neptunus Rotterdam	22	1991	2026
2nd	Amsterdam Pirates	7	1987	2023
3rd	Kinheim Haarlem	4	1994	2012
4th	Mr. Cocker HCAW	3	1996	2022
5th	Haarlem Nicols	2	1988	1989
5th	Sparta-Feyenoord	2	1972	1973
6th	Hoofddorp Pioniers	1	1997	
7th	ADO Den Haag	1	1992	

== See also ==
- Baseball awards in the Netherlands
- Baseball awards in Europe
