= 2007 Holland Series =

The 2007 Holland Series involved the Corendon Kinheim, defeating the Konica Minolta Pioniers in 3 straight games.
