= Kinheim =

Baseball and softball club in Haarlem, the Netherlands (founded in 1935)

Information
- League: Honkbal Hoofdklasse
- Location: Haarlem
- Ballpark: Pim Mulier Stadium, 2,500 capacity
- Founded: August 20, 1935
- Holland Series championships: 1978, 1994, 2006, 2007, 2012
- European Cup championships: 2007
- League championships: 1994, 2006
- 2025: 20–32
- 0–2
- Former name: Corendon Kinheim, Wera Kinheim
- Retired numbers: 14, 16, 22, 26, 47
- Chairwoman: Yvonne Campfens
- Manager: Milan Lammerts
- Website: Kinheim.net

Current uniforms
Home	Away

Kinheim is a baseball and softball club based in Haarlem, the Netherlands. Kinheim's top baseball team plays in the Honkbal Hoofdklasse, the top level of professional baseball in the Netherlands. Kinheim plays at Pim Mulier Stadium, also the home field for Haarlem Baseball Week.

The club's most successful period was in the 1990s, when it reached the Holland Series in five consecutive seasons from 1992 to 1996. The team lost four of its national championships but became Dutch champions in 1994, beating Neptunus 3–2 in a five-game series.

In 2006, Kinheim won the Hoofdklasse and the national cup trophy, the KNBSB-Beker. After beating HCAW in the playoffs to qualify for the 2006 Holland Series, Kinheim won the series 3–2 against the Hoofddoorp Pioniers.

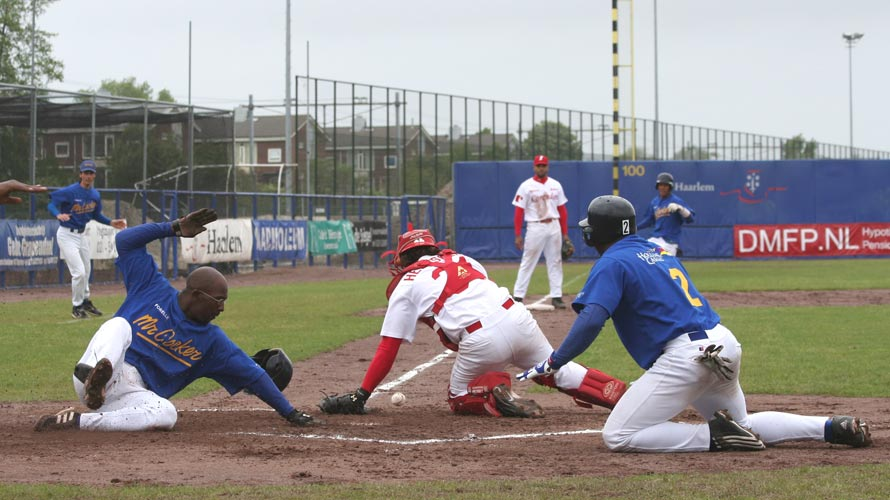
Kinheim (in red) playing HCAW in 2007

After its victorious 2006 season, Kinheim qualified for the 2007 European Cup in San Marino, which it also won. Kinheim finished third in the European Cup in 1995 and 2009, where it bested fellow Dutch team Amsterdam Pirates. Kinheim again won the Holland Series in 2007, defeating the Pioniers in a three-game sweep. Kinheim also won the 2012 Holland Series. Kinheim abruptly withdrew from the Hoofdklasse at the end of 2016, citing a lack of players for the top Dutch league. The club qualified for the promotion/relegation playoffs in 2018 and 2019 but lost both years and did not return to the Hoofdklasse.

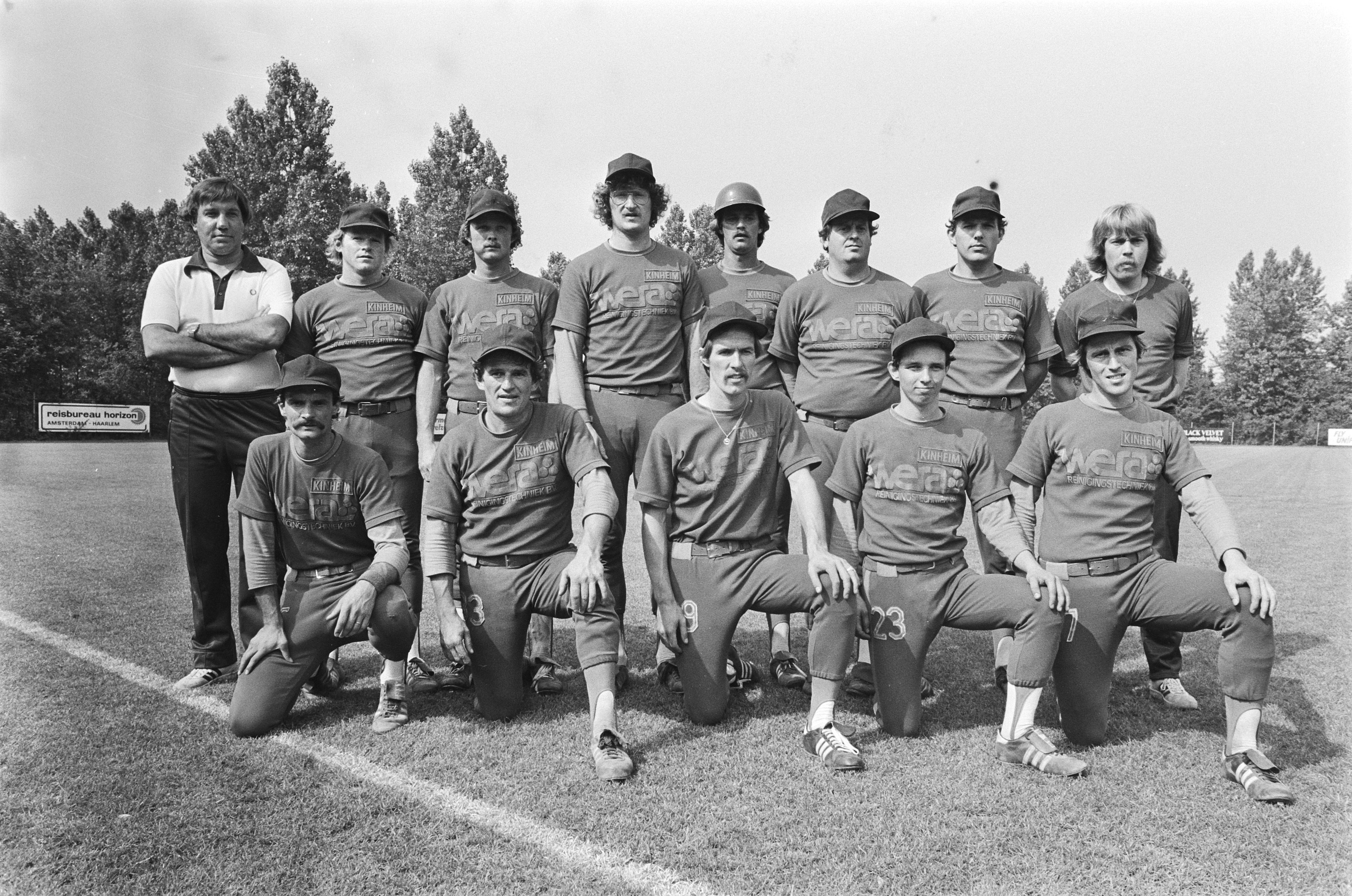
Wera Kinheim players in 1978

From 2020 to 2024, Kinheim fielded a combined team with fellow Haarlem club DSS called DSS/Kinheim. DSS defeated Kinheim in the 2019 relegation playoff, but DSS could not participate in the league due to financial difficulties. The partnership allowed the combined clubs to continue fielding a team from Haarlem in the Hoofdklasse. In August 2024, the two clubs announced their partnership would end, with Kinheim staying in the Hoofdklasse in 2025 and DSS competing in the lower Eerste Klasse.

On 16 October 2024, Kinheim announced Milan Lammerts would coach the team in 2025. He had played for DSS/Kinheim in 2021 and 2022. Kinheim lost in the wild card playoff in its first season back in the Hoofdklasse.

== Retired numbers ==
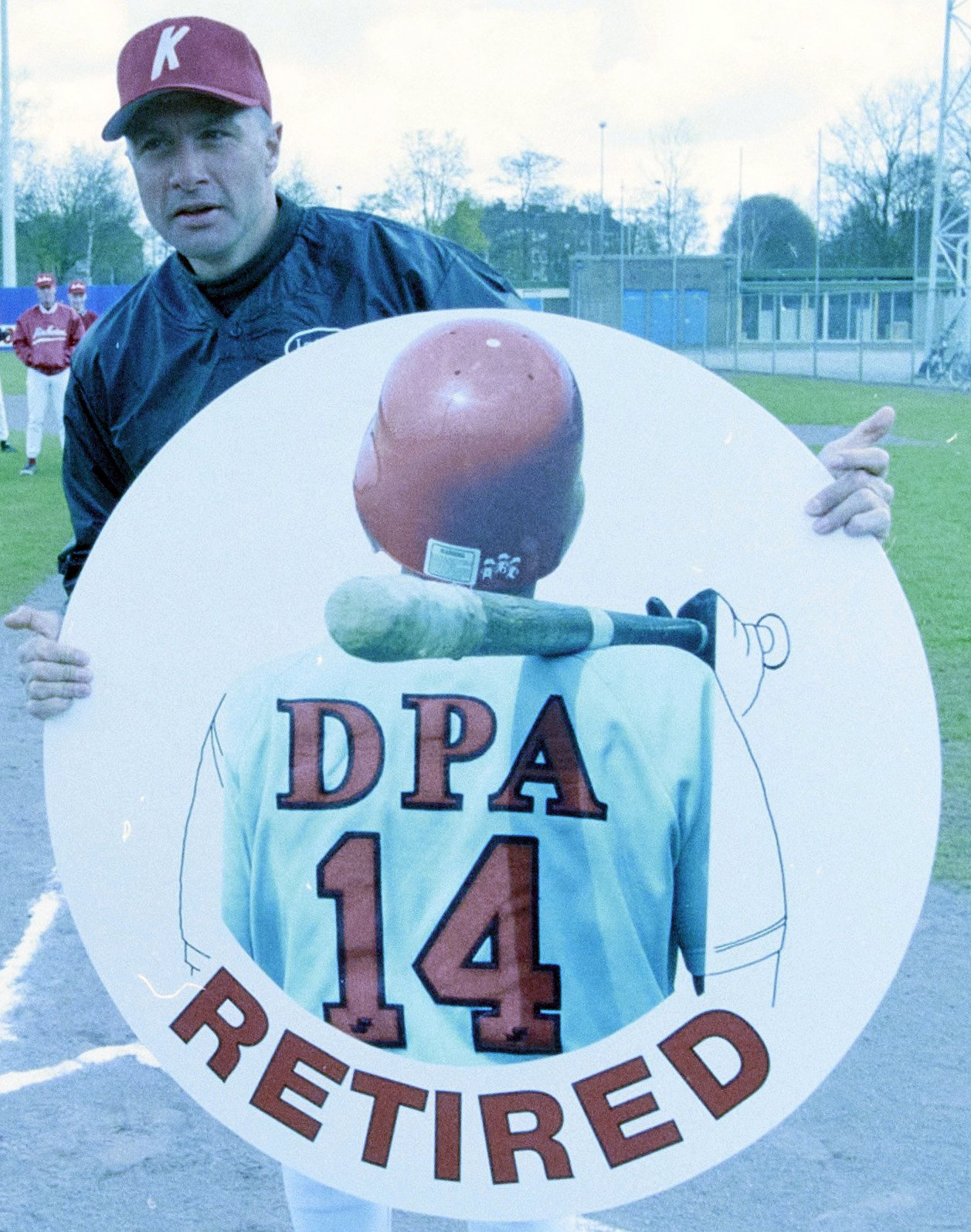
Marcel Joost holding his retired number in 2003

- #14 Marcel Joost, outfielder
- #16 Patrick Beljaards, pitcher
- #22 Hans van Driel Krol, second baseman
- #26 Greg Halman, outfielder
- #47 David Bergman, pitcher
