= Pioniers =

Worldwide Pharma Logistics Hoofddorp Pioniers

Information
- League: Honkbal Hoofdklasse
- Location: Hoofddorp
- Ballpark: Sportpark Pioniers, 1,000 capacity
- Founded: 1966
- Holland Series championships: 1997
- 2024: 13-33 (8th place)
- Former name(s): Vaessen Pioniers, Konica Minolta Pioniers
- Manager: Tom van Limburg
- Website: Official website

Current uniforms
Home	Away

Pioniers is a baseball and softball team based in Hoofddorp, the Netherlands. The club is currently sponsored by Worldwide Pharma Logistics, and the team is officially called Worldwide Pharma Logistics Hoofddorp Pioniers. Under previous sponsorships, the team had been called the Vaessen Pioniers and Konica Minolta Pioniers.

The team plays in the Honkbal Hoofdklasse, the top level of professional baseball in the Netherlands. The club's most successful season was 1997, when it reached the Holland Series for the first time by beating reigning champions DOOR Neptunus in the playoffs. In the Holland Series, it claimed victory over Mr. Cocker HCAW, 3 games to 2, winning the Dutch championship. In 2006, the Pioniers finished third in the Honkbal Hoofdklasse and, just like in 1997, upset Neptunus in the playoffs, advancing to the 2006 Holland Series. In that series they twice took the series lead, but ultimately lost to Kinheim 3 games to 2.

The team attempted to attract Major League Baseball regular season games for the opening of its new stadium, Sportpark Pioniers, in 2014. The stadium, located close to Schipol Airport, can temporarily expand to accommodate 30,000 fans.
