= HCAW =

Information
- League: Honkbal Hoofdklasse
- Location: Bussum
- Ballpark: Rob Hoffmann Vallei, 1,000 capacity
- Founded: 1957
- Holland Series championships: 1996, 1998, 2022
- 2025: 37–14, (2nd place)
- 5–4, lost in Holland Series
- Colors: Blue, yellow, white
- Ownership: Scott Prins
- Chairman: Arno Timmermans
- Manager: René Baltus
- Website: hcaw.nl

Current uniforms
Home	Away

Honkbalclub Allen Weerbaar is a Dutch professional baseball and softball club from Bussum. As of 2024, the club has about 400 members, including 270 players. The club baseball team plays in the Honkbal Hoofdklasse, and the softball team has played in the Softbal Hoofdklasse. The club was formerly known as Mr. Cocker HCAW due to a sponsored agreement.

== History ==
HCAW was established in 1957 as an independent baseball and softball club. Between 1949 and 1957 it operated as the baseball division of the Bussum sporting club Allen Weerbaar. The team played on a football field until 1958, when the city of Bussum agreed to build a baseball field for the club in Bussum Zuid. HCAW added a softball division in 1966.

The same year, HCAW was promoted to the Honkbal Hoofdklasse for the first time. In 1970, the club moved to its current field in the Bussumse Sportvallei. In 1988, HCAW was demoted to the Honkbal Overgangsklasse. Following the relegation, financial issues forced the club to combine with the Amstel Tijgers, an Amsterdam-based club. The fused team played in the Hoofdklasse under the name HCAW-Tijgers from 1989 to 1994. Since 1995, HCAW has played in the Hoofdklasse under its original name.

The baseball team was won thre Hoofdklasse championships, in 1996, 1998, and 2022.

The softball team won 9 Softbal Hoofdklasse championships between 1985 and 1997, but currently competes in a lower level.

== Retired numbers ==
- #1 Jeffrey Cranston
- #10 Clive Mendes
- #12 Jurjan Koenen
- #24 Roy Berrevoets

== Notable baseball players ==
- Chicho Jesurun, also a coach, manager, and scout
- Iván Granados
- Pavel Budský
- Sidney de Jong
- Patrick de Lange
- Nick Stuifbergen
- Calvin Maduro
- Ralph Milliard, also a coach
- Dave Draijer
- Kenny Berkenbosch
- Loek van Mil
- Lars Huijer
- Nelmerson Xavier Angela
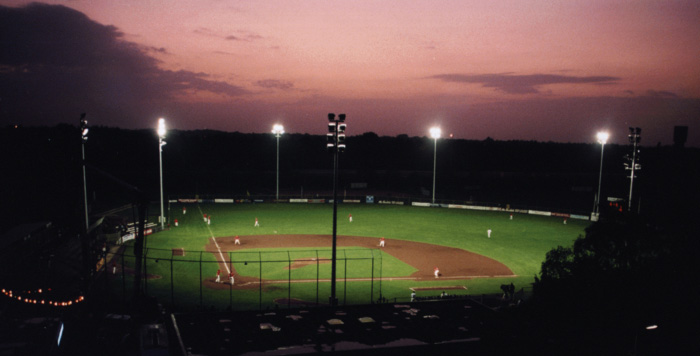
Nightview on the Rob Hoffmannvallei
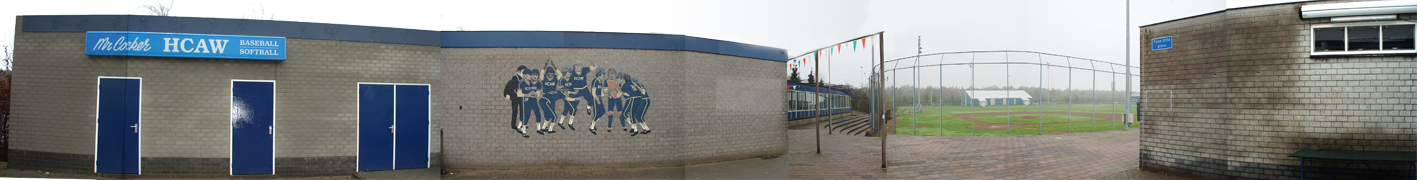
View of the outside of the field and clubhouse
