= Honkbal Hoofdklasse =

Dutch professional baseball league

- Current season, competition or edition: 2026 Honkbal Hoofdklasse season
- Formerly: Eerste Klasse
- Sport: Baseball
- Founded: 1922
- No. of teams: 7
- Country: Netherlands
- Confederation: KNBSB
- Most recent champion: Neptunus (2025)
- Most titles: Neptunus (21 titles)
- Sponsor: Lucky Day
- Level on pyramid: 1
- Related competitions: European Cup; Holland Series

The Honkbal Hoofdklasse (Dutch for Major League Baseball) is the highest level of professional baseball in the Netherlands. It is a seven-team league overseen by the Royal Netherlands Baseball and Softball Federation (KNBSB).

Games are played principally on weekends with one game during the week. The season runs from April to September and is followed by the playoffs among the four best teams, which culminates in the Holland Series. The league followed a promotion and relegation system with the Honkbal Overgangsklasse until 2022. Many of the official team nicknames have contained the name of the club's sponsor.

The top two teams each year participated in the European Cup until that tournament restructured in 2024. Two teams will compete in the Baseball Champions League Europe.

== History ==
The Honkbal Hoofdklasse has been the highest level of competitive baseball in the Netherlands since 1958, when it was elevated over the former Eerste Klasse by the Koninklijke Nederlandse Honkbal Bond, the forerunner of the KNBSB. The Eerste Klasse served as the top baseball competition in the Netherlands from its establishment in 1922 until 1957, excluding 1945 when play was suspended due to World War II. The Hoofdklasse has been organized by the KNBSB since 1971.

Until 1986, the winner of the season was also crowned the national champion, except for 1972 and 1973, when a best-of-five playoff Holland Series was held between the top two teams to determine the champion. The Holland Series returned in 1987 and has been held annually at the end of the season to determine the national champion. The championship series is currently held in a best-of-seven format. The top six teams qualify for the playoffs, with the top two teams earning a bye through the wild card round.

In 2021, the Eerste Klasse was reinstated as the second level of Dutch professional baseball and the league to which teams from the Hoofdklasse are relegated at the end of the season. It previously was the second league in the Dutch baseball pyramid from 1958 to 1986 and 2001 to 2009. In the intervening years, from 1987 to 2000 and 2010 to 2020, the Overgangsklasse operated as the secondary baseball league in the Netherlands.

Following the 2021 season, the KNBSB decided to end relegation and promotion and operate the Hoofdklasse with fixed teams. The reform was part of broader efforts to improve the league's quality of play and national visibility. The league expanded to nine teams for the 2022 season. The Silicon Storks, who were slated to be relegated, remained in the Hoofdklasse alongside RCH-Pinguins, who had defeated the Storks in a playoff to earn promotion to the top league. The Storks were replaced in 2023 by UVV, which had been in the Hoofdklasse until 2017. The league saw more changes after the 2024 season, with Kinheim replacing DSS/Kinheim in the top league and Quick Amersfoort voluntarily moving down to the Eerste Klasse, and the 2025 season, when RCH's members also voted to move down from the top level.

== Current clubs ==

Team	City	Stadium	Capacity
Neptunus	Rotterdam	Neptunus Familiestadion	2,760
Kinheim	Haarlem	Pim Mulier Stadium	2,500
Amsterdam Pirates	Amsterdam	Loek Loevendie Ballpark	2,000
HCAW	Bussum	Rob Hoffman Vallei	1,000
Hoofddorp Pioniers	Hoofddorp	Sportpark Pioniers	1,000
UVV	Utrecht	Sportpark de Paperclip	1,000
Twins Oosterhout	Oosterhout	Sportpark Slotbosse Toren	500

== 2025 final standings ==
The final 2025 Hoofdklasse standings:

Rank	Baseball club	W-L-T
1	Neptunus	44–7–0
2	HCAW	37–14–0
3	Twins Oosterhout	26–20–1
4	Amsterdam Pirates	24–23–0
5	Kinheim	20–32–0
6	Hoofddorp Pioniers	23–29–1
7	UVV	15–34–2
8	RCH-Pinguins	10–40–0

At the conclusion of the league's playoffs, Neptunus defeated HCAW to win their 21st Holland Series title.

== Results ==
Hoofdklasse championships
Rank	Team	Titles	First	Last
1st	Neptunus Rotterdam	22	1981	2026
2nd	Haarlem Nicols	12	1965	1989
3rd	Blauw-Wit Amsterdam	9	1923	1946
3rd	Sparta Rotterdam	9	1963	1974
5th	Amsterdam Pirates	7	1987	2023
6th	OVVO Amsterdam	6	1949	1955
7th	Kinheim	5	1978	2012
7th	SC Haarlem	5	1929	1941
7th	Schoten Haarlem	5	1947	1961
10th	Ajax Amsterdam	4	1924	1948
11th	Amstel Tijgers	3	1979	1986
11th	EHS Haarlem	3	1954	1962
11th	HCAW	3	1996	2022
11th	Quick Amsterdam	3	1922	1935
15th	AGHC Amsterdam	2	1926	1927
16th	ADO Den Haag	1	1992	
16th	EDO Haarlem	1	1958	
16th	HHC Haarlem	1	1936	
16th	Hoofddorp Pioniers	1	1997	
16th	Seagulls Amsterdam	1	1939	
16th	VVGA Amsterdam	1	1933	

== See also ==
- Baseball awards § Europe
- Baseball awards § Netherlands
- Baseball in the Netherlands
