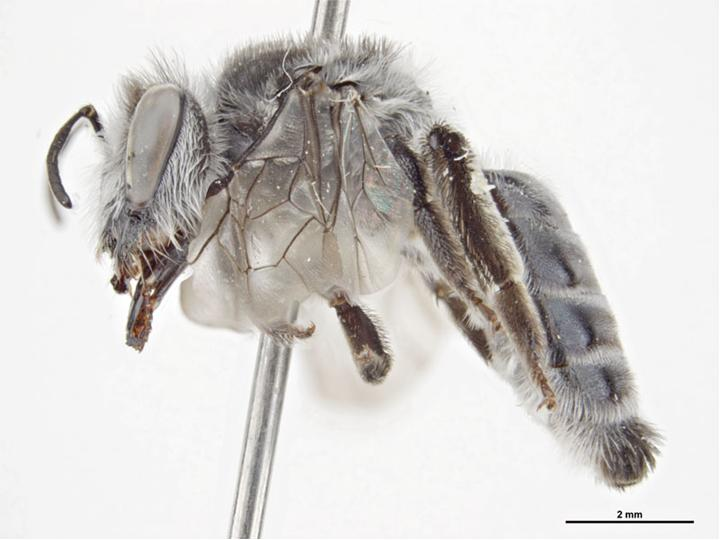
- Female

Scientific classification
- Kingdom: Animalia
- Phylum: Arthropoda
- Clade: Pancrustacea
- Class: Insecta
- Order: Hymenoptera
- Family: Colletidae
- Genus: Leioproctus
- Species: L. excubitor

Binomial name
- Leioproctus excubitor Houston, 1991

Synonyms
- Leioproctus (Leioproctus) excubitor Houston, 1991

= Leioproctus excubitor =

Species of bee

Leioproctus excubitor, or Leioproctus (Alokocolletes) excubitor, is a species of bee in the family Colletidae and subfamily Colletinae. It is endemic to Australia. It was described by Australian entomologist Terry Houston in 1991.

== Etymology ==
The specific epithet excubitor (Latin: "sentinel") alludes to the perching habits of the bees.

== Description ==
The male holotype body length is 12 mm, head width 4.0 mm; female paratype body length 10 mm, head width 3.45 mm. Integumental colouration is mainly black; the hair is mostly white.

== Distribution and habitat ==
The species occurs in arid and semiarid regions of western and central Australia. The type locality is East Yuna Reserve some 34 km west-north-west of Mullewa, Western Australia.

== Behaviour ==
The adults are flying mellivores. Flowering plants visited by the bees include Asphodelus fistulosus, Dampiera incana, Eucalyptus oldfieldii, Rhodanthe charsleyae, Schoenia cassiniana, Comesperma scoparium, Grevillea didymobotrya, Solanum coactiliferum and Melaleuca nematophylla, as well as Acacia, Senna and Ptilotus species.

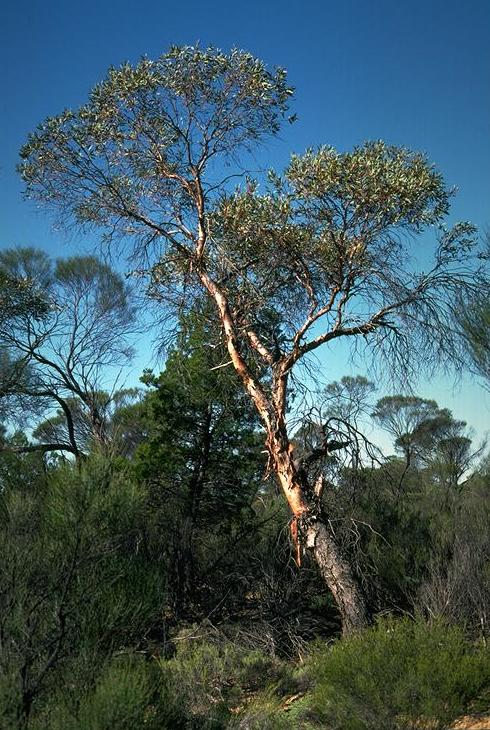
Eucalyptus oldfieldii (Oldfield's mallee), a forage plant of the bees

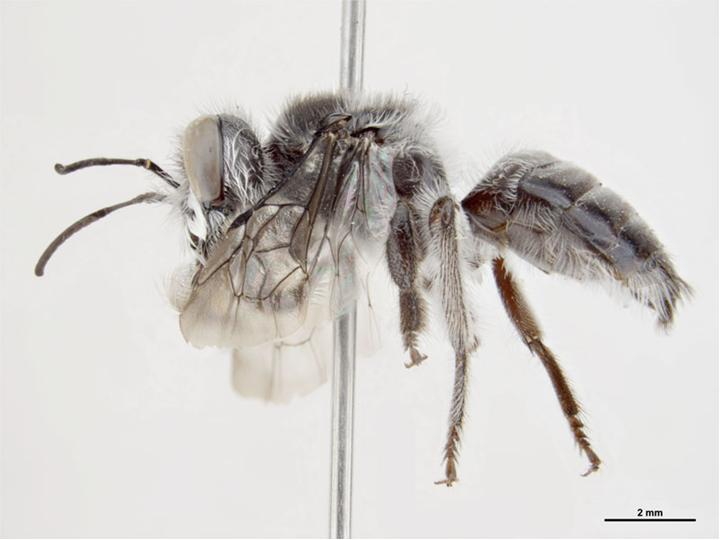
Male
