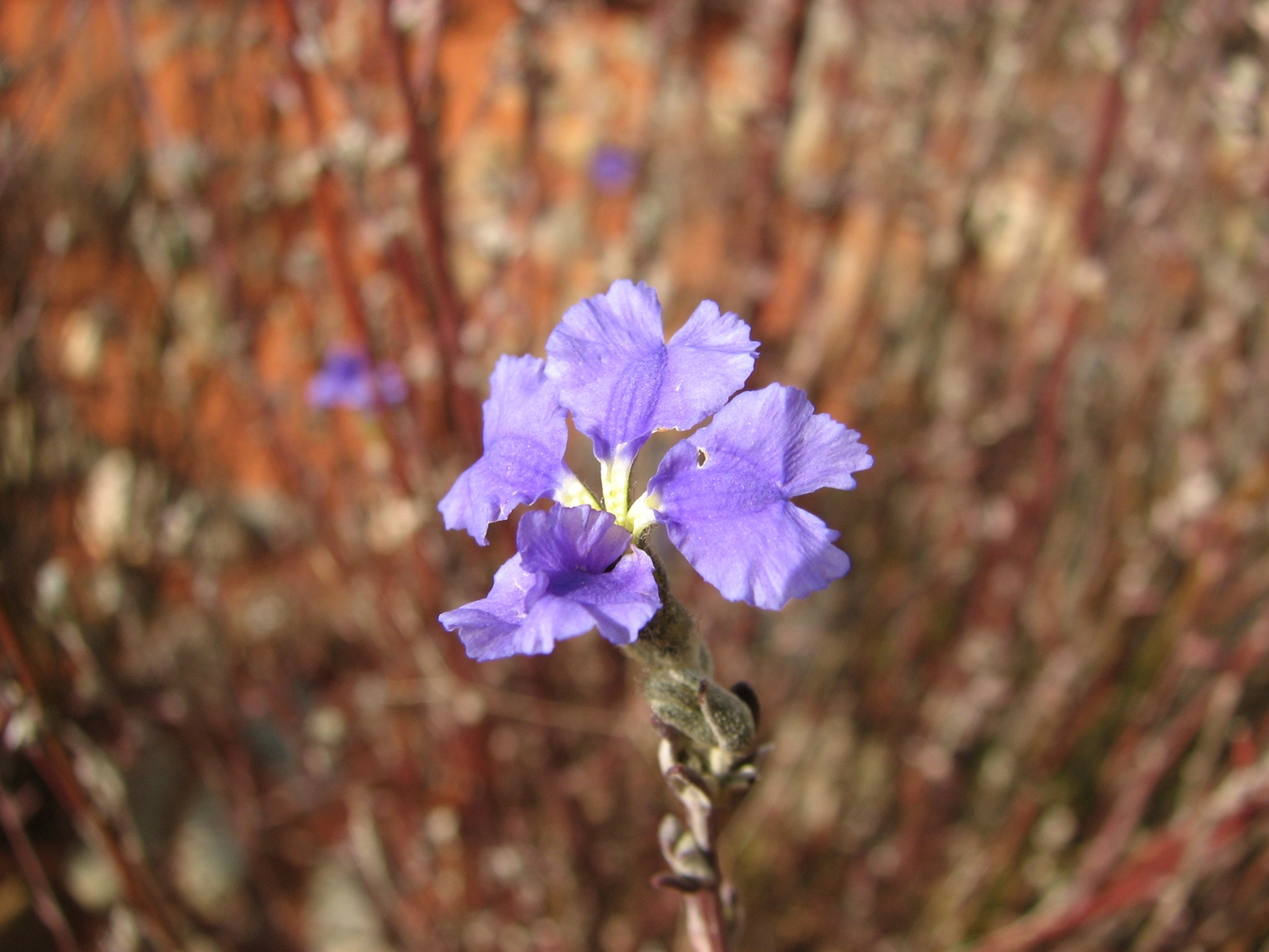

Scientific classification
- Kingdom: Plantae
- Clade: Tracheophytes
- Clade: Angiosperms
- Clade: Eudicots
- Clade: Asterids
- Order: Asterales
- Family: Goodeniaceae
- Genus: Dampiera
- Species: D. dysantha

Binomial name
- Dampiera dysantha (Benth.) Rajput & Carolin

Synonyms
- Dampiera rosmarinifolia var. dysantha Benth.

= Dampiera dysantha =

Species of plant

Dampiera dysantha, the shrubby dampiera, is an undershrub in the family Goodeniaceae. The species grows to 70 cm high The flowers are blue, or occasionally white to lilac and are covered on the outside with grey and rusty hairs. These generally appear between September and October in its native range.

The species was first formally described as a variety of Dampiera rosmarinifolia by English botanist George Bentham in Flora Australiensis in 1868.
