= D. juncea =

D. juncea may refer to:

- Dampiera juncea, a plant with yellow-centred flowers
- Daphnobela juncea, an extinct mollusc
- Dicerca juncea, a jewel beetle
- Diostea juncea, a dicotyledonous plant
