= Dampiera altissima =

Tall dampiera

Scientific classification
- Kingdom: Plantae
- Clade: Tracheophytes
- Clade: Angiosperms
- Clade: Eudicots
- Clade: Asterids
- Order: Asterales
- Family: Goodeniaceae
- Genus: Dampiera
- Species: D. altissima

Binomial name
- Dampiera altissima F.Muell. ex Benth.
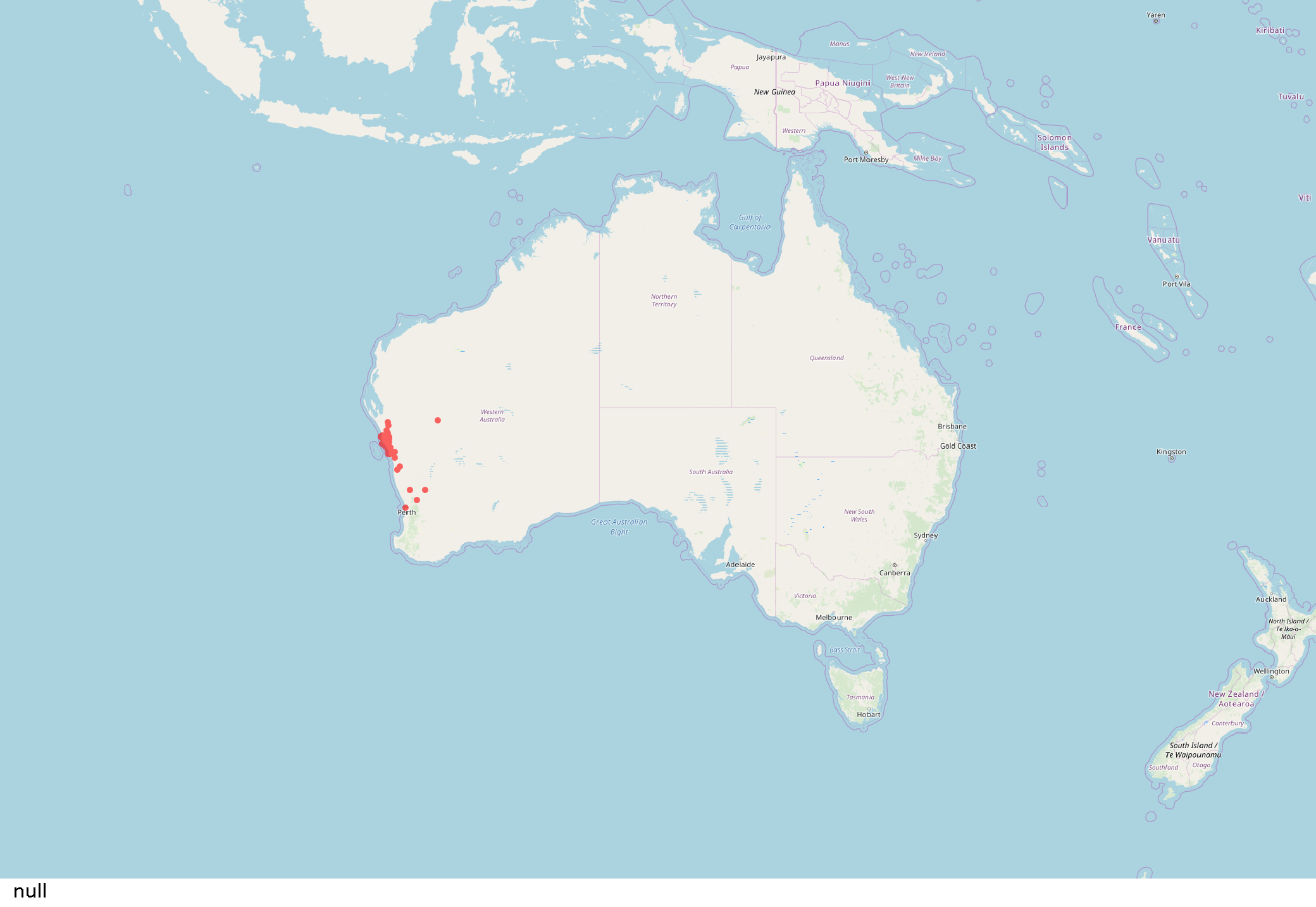
- Distribution data from Atlas of Living Australia

Species of plant

Habit

Dampiera altissima, commonly known as tall dampiera, is an erect perennial herb of the family Goodeniaceae and is native to Western Australia. It is a perennial herb that generally grows to a height of up to 0.5 m (1 ft 8 in) and has flat, green-grey leaves. The leaves are mostly round and are between 8–60 mm (0.3 to 2.4 in) long. Dampiera altissima flowers during the winter and spring, unveiling small blue-purple flowers. The herb is a ground cover plant found growing on the sandplains, laterite and sandstone of the southwestern region of Western Australia, most common in the Geraldton area north of Perth. The species is sometimes grown as an ornamental plant and is listed as “not threatened”.

== Description ==
Dampiera altissima typically grows between 0.1 and 0.5 m (3.9 and 19.7 in) high and is described as a ground cover plant. It features ribbed stems and decumbent leaves of generally 8 to 60 mm (0.3 to 2.4 in) in length and 3 to 18 mm (0.1 to 0.7 in) in width. The leaves are sessile or petiolate and are flat, with a narrowly obloid to lanceolate shape. The indumentum of the leaves is stellate, greyish, glabrescent on the top of the leaves and mostly tomentose on the bottom. The leaf margins vary between being smooth and round (entire) or toothed (serrate).

Floral buds grow during June and October. The petals (corolla) are blue or mauve and are usually 8 to 15 mm (0.3 to 0.6 in) in length. The petals are auriculate and do not have spurs. Both the inside and outside of the corolla are hairy; the outside hairs are particularly dense. The hairs of the corolla are pale grey. The flowers of D. altissima are notable by the cup at the tip of the style. Each style is 4 to 4.5 mm (0.15 to 0.18 in) long and is smooth. The anthers at the tips of filaments are connate. On the flowers of D. altissima, bracteoles are present and cover the outside of the bud in its early stages of flowering. The bracteoles are hairy, obloid and are 4.5 to 5.5 mm (0.18 to 0.22 in) in length. Dampiera altissima has epigynous flowers, with the ovary of each flower sitting below the petals. The plant has 1-2 ovules, which are upright. The calyx lobes, each 1 to 2 mm (0.04 to 0.08 in) in length, are equally winged and have high density of hairs. The outer lobes are each 5.5 to 12 mm (0.22 to 0.5 in) in length and are unequally winged. The wings are 1.2 mm (0.05 in) wide on the narrower side of the outer lobe and 3 to 3.2 mm (0.12 to 0.13 in) wide on the broader side. The pedicels are generally 3 mm (0.12 in) in length and are hairy. The inflorescence branches are usually 9 to 21 mm (0.35 to 0.83 in) in length). There is one flower per floral axis.

The fruit of D. altissima are oblong-shaped and slightly curved. They are usually around 4 mm (0.15 in) long and are glabrescent.

Dampiera altissima is similar in appearance to Dampiera salahae, which is ascending perennial. Instead of having grey tomentose on the bottom of its leaves, like D. altissima, D. salahae has white tomentose.

== Taxonomy ==
Dampiera altissima was first formally described in 1868 by George Bentham in Flora Australiensis from specimens collected by Augustus Oldfield near the Murchison River. During Mueller's appointment as the Government botanist of Victoria from 1853, he amassed a large collection of Australian flora, of which included D. altissima. Although Mueller was invited to Kew to pursue further education in taxonomy to begin work on Australian flora, he remained in Australia and the work on Australian flora was instead assigned to Bentham. Mueller's plant samples and notes were sent from Melbourne to Kew on loan for Bentham to write his Flora Australiensis. Due to Mueller's provision of Australian flora samples and his notes on the description of the name, the binomial name of D. altissima includes his botanical name, F.Muell., as well, as although Mueller was not the original publisher of the plant's classification, he made significant contributions.

== Etymology ==
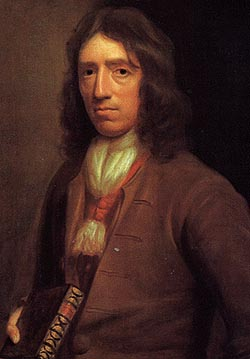
William Dampier

The genus name, Dampiera, is named after the British buccaneer turned naturalist, William Dampier (1651–1751). Dampier was one of the first Englishmen to have explored Australia and during his first expedition in 1688, he captured many of the first recorded descriptions and depictions of Australian flora and fauna. The genus, Dampiera, containing 90 shrubs and herbs, is native only to Australia and can be found in all Australian states. The specific epithet, altissima, derives from the feminine, superlative form of the Latin adjective, altus, meaning “tall”. This epithet refers to the fact that D. altissima is the tallest species of the Dampiera genus, although all species of the Dampiera genus are relatively short.

== Distribution and habitat ==
Dampiera altissima grows in the South-West Botanical Province of Western Australia, mainly on the coastline of the Irwin Botanical District, which is situated around Geraldton, north of Perth. However, it has been observed growing as far as the Avon Botanical District, east of Perth.

The South-West Botanical Province is described as a mostly flat area covering the southwestern region between Shark Bay and Israelite Bay. This floristic province has an elevation range of approximately 42 to 475 m (137.8 to 1558.4 ft). The South-West Botanical Province is described as having a mild Mediterranean climate. During the winter months, the climate is cool and wet, with rain approaching from the east-moving mid-latitude depressions. In the summer months, the climate is hot and dry, during which rain can be absent for five to six months at a time. The flora of this region is described to be highly adaptable to heavy rain, fire and drought conditions. There are approximately 8000 species of angiosperms within the South-West Botanical Province, 79% of which are native to the area; a percentage higher than other botanical provinces in Australia and comparable to the California Floristic Province.

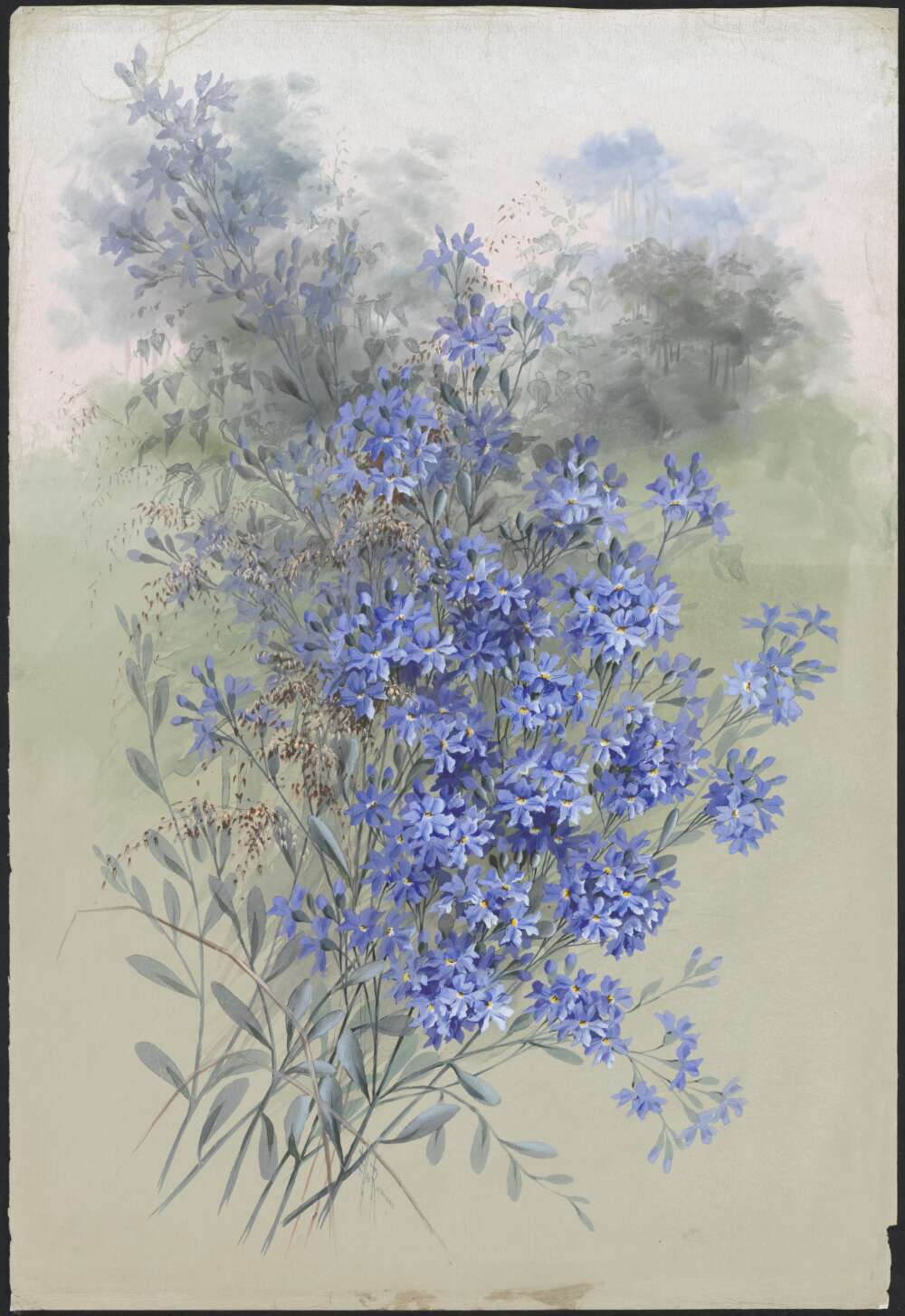
Ellis Rowan's watercolour painting of D. altissima

Within the South-West Botanical Province, there is a large soil variety, however, D. altissima grows mostly only on sandplains, sandstone or laterite stone. Although the herb has been observed growing within the Karri Forest, which consists mainly of loam soil. Within the Karri Forest, there is limited ground cover, except for species of Dampiera, which are common.

== Conservation ==
Much of the flora within the South-West Botanical Province is threatened due to urban planning, disease, increased salinisation of soil due to secondary salinity, abnormal growth in the kangaroo population, weed invasion and increased frequency of wildfires. Currently, D. altissima is classified as "not threatened". However, D. altissima has not yet been classified by the International Union for Conservation of Nature (IUCN) as many species endemic to the South-West Botanical Province, like D. altissima, are lesser known, hence their conservation statuses cannot be confirmed until further research is conducted.

== Uses ==
Although not commonly cultivated for any particular uses, D. altissima can be used as an ornamental plant, due to its blue and mauve flowers. When it is used as an ornamental plant, it is suitable for pots and hanging plant baskets. However, as D. altissima is a ground cover plant, it can also be suitable for planting on top of a retaining wall.

=== In horticulture ===
Dampiera altissima grows mostly during the winter and spring months of the Southern Hemisphere and usually flowers between June and October. The best cultivation conditions for the herb are in light clay to sandy soils or most well-drained soils with frequent exposure to sunlight, light to moderate watering and occasional summer watering during infrequent rainfall. Sand mulch, although not frequently used, is the most suitable mulch for D. altissima. However, D. altissima is highly adaptable and is able to tolerate changes in climate and to survive in flood, drought and fire conditions.
