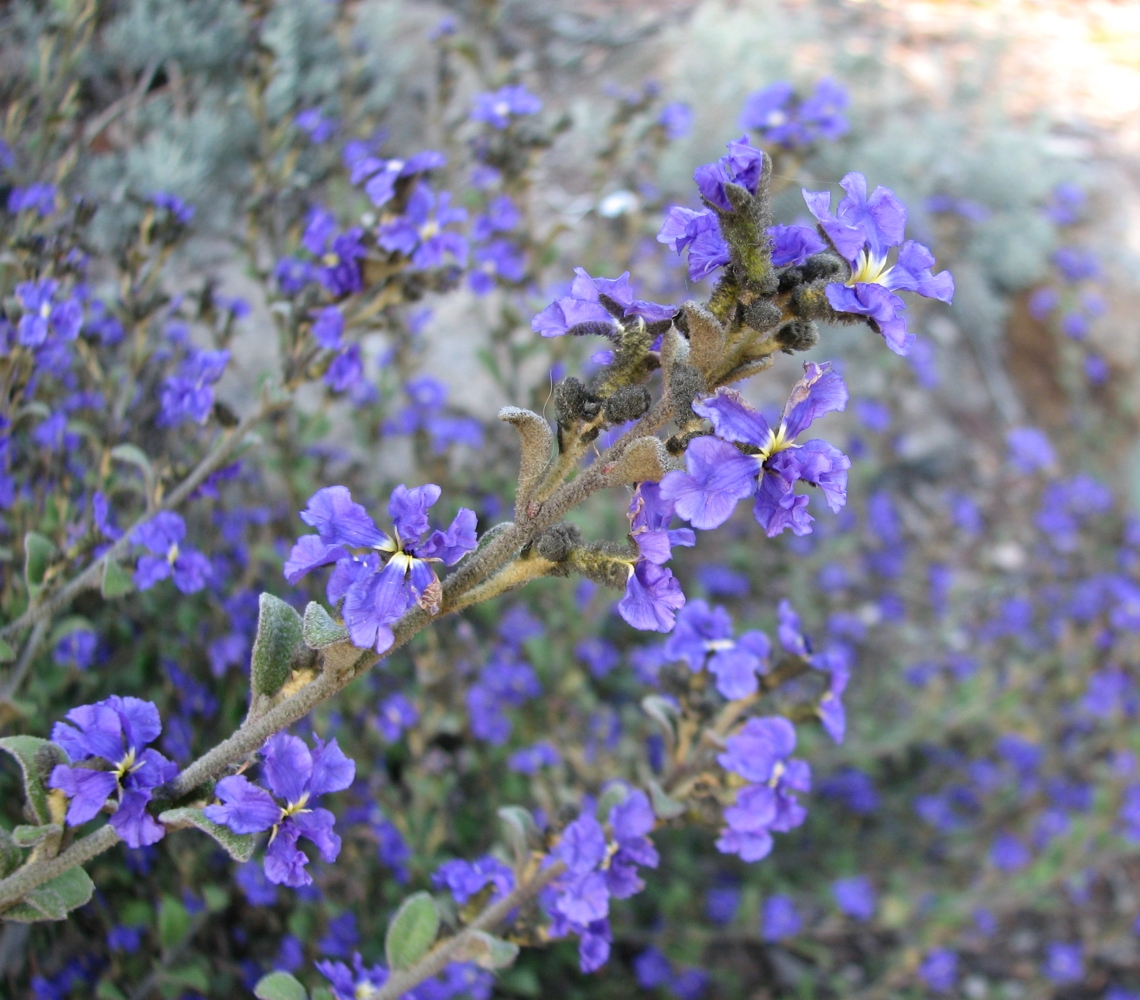

Scientific classification
- Kingdom: Plantae
- Clade: Tracheophytes
- Clade: Angiosperms
- Clade: Eudicots
- Clade: Asterids
- Order: Asterales
- Family: Goodeniaceae
- Genus: Dampiera
- Species: D. purpurea

Binomial name
- Dampiera purpurea R.Br.

Synonyms
- List: Dampiera bicolor de Vriese; Dampiera undulata R.Br.; Dampiera brownii F.Muell. nom. illeg.; Dampiera melanopogon de Vriese nom. illeg.; Dampiera brownii var. ovalifolia (R.Br.) Domin; Dampiera ovalifolia R.Br.; Dampiera omissa de Vriese; Dampiera rotundifolia R.Br.; Dampiera brownii var. rotundifolia (R.Br.) Domin; Dampiera nervosa de Vriese

= Dampiera purpurea =

Species of plant

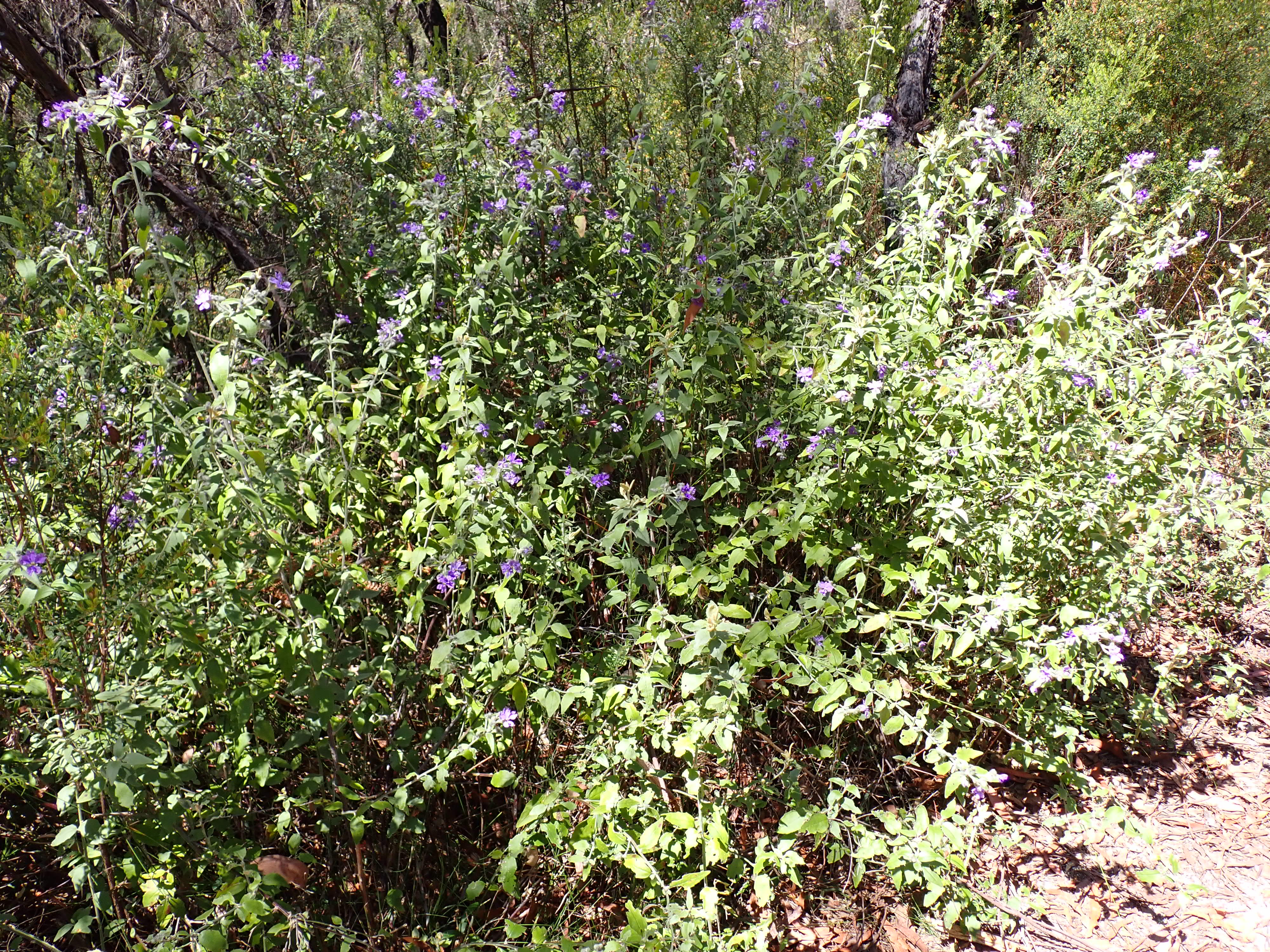
Habit in the Gibraltar Range National Park

Dampiera purpurea, commonly known as the mountain- or purple dampiera, is a subshrub in the family Goodeniaceae native to Victoria, New South Wales and Queensland in eastern Australia. Its blue-purple flowers appear in spring and early summer (September to December), and it is pollinated by insects such as butterflies and bees. Adapting readily to cultivation, Dampiera purpurea is grown as a garden plant in Australia.

== Taxonomy ==
The prolific botanist Robert Brown described Dampiera purpurea in his 1810 work Prodromus Florae Novae Hollandiae et Insulae Van Diemen. Its species name is the Latin adjective purpureus "purple".

== Description ==
Dampiera purpurea is an erect multi-stemmed plant to 1 m (3.3 ft) high with obovate to elliptic leaves which are 0.9 to 6 cm (0.35 to 2.36 in) long and 0.5 to 4.2 cm (0.20 to 1.65 in) wide. The stems and undersides of leaves are covered in fine hair and rough in texture, while the leaves are bare of hair when mature. The flowers are mainly produced between August and January in the species' native range. Three to five flowers arise each on groups of two to nine flower-bearing branches. Reaching 2.5 cm (1 in) in diameter, they are generally blue-purple in colour with yellow centres, though pink and white flowers have been recorded.

== Distribution and habitat ==
Dampiera purpurea occurs in sclerophyll forest and heath in Victoria, New South Wales and Queensland. In the Sydney region, it is found under such trees as smooth-barked apple (Angophora costata), yellow bloodwood (Corymbia eximia), red bloodwood (C. gummifera), blackbutt (Eucalyptus pilularis), monkey gum (E. cypellocarpa), silvertop ash (E. sieberi), Sydney peppermint (E. piperita), predominantly on sandstone-based soils but sometimes also clay soils, and generally in places with good drainage. the annual rainfall is 800 to 1600 mm.

== Ecology ==
Dampiera purpurea is killed by bushfire, with new shoots arising from ground level. These can then flower in ten months, peaking around two to three years after a fire. It also regenerates by seed from fire.

Butterflies of the families Lycaenidae and Hesperiidae and European honeybees forage at the flowers, and are likely pollinators.

== Cultivation ==
Dampiera purpurea can be grown in cool to subtropical climates. It is a variable species, reflected by the many forms in cultivation. Preferring a lightly shaded position, it also adapts to full sun and has some frost tolerance. It is adaptable to most reasonably drained soils but is more vigorous in heavier soils. Best results are obtained through a steady supply of moisture in spring and summer, though it will withstand dry periods once established. A light pruning after flowering keeps plants in shape. Plants can be propagated by cuttings or division.
