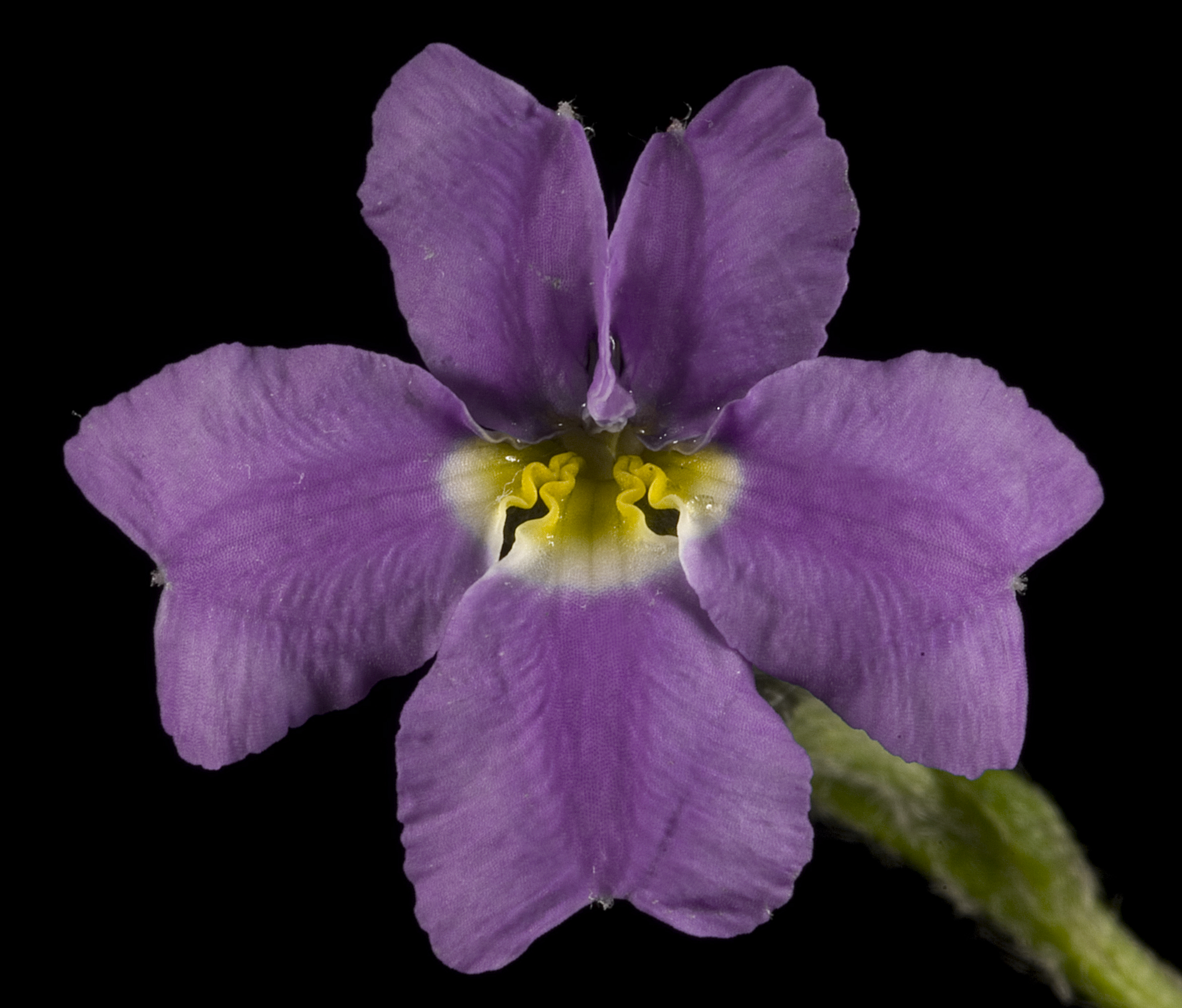

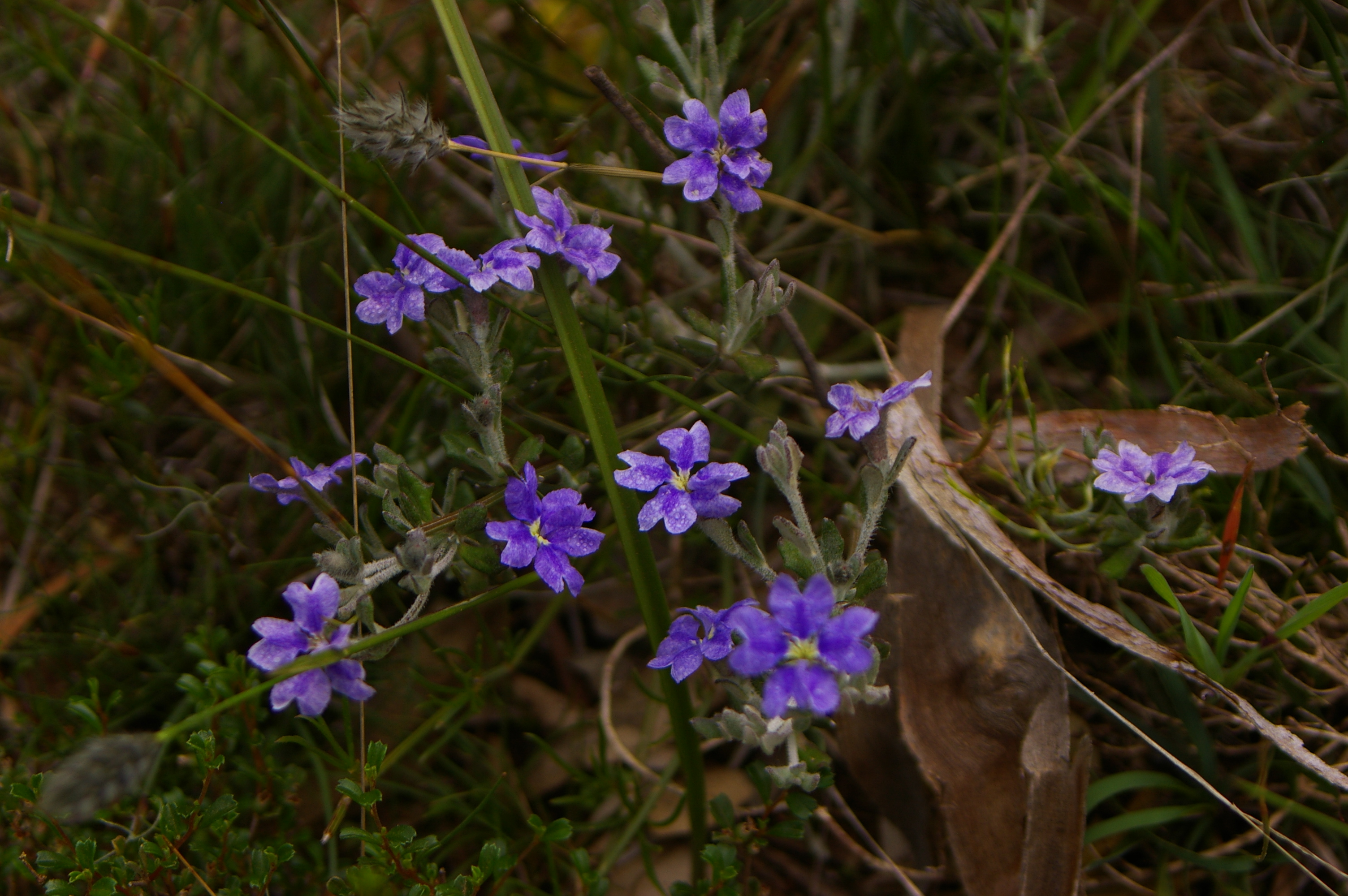

Scientific classification
- Kingdom: Plantae
- Clade: Tracheophytes
- Clade: Angiosperms
- Clade: Eudicots
- Clade: Asterids
- Order: Asterales
- Family: Goodeniaceae
- Genus: Dampiera
- Species: D. alata

Binomial name
- Dampiera alata Lindl.

Synonyms
- Dampiera epiphylloidea de Vriese

= Dampiera alata =

Species of flowering plant

Dampiera alata is a plant in the family Goodeniaceae, native to Western Australia.

== Description ==
Dampiera alata is a perennial herb growing up to 40 cm, with no surface covering except on the inflorescence. The stems are flat and winged, and 3 to 13 mm wide with distinct ribs on each wing's margin. The leaves are sessile (i.e., not on stalks) and the leaf blades are 18 to 49 mm by 3.5 to 16 mm. The flowers are in panicles, with the inflorescence branches usually being solitary. The bracteoles are covered with dense intertwined hairs and 2.5 to 4 mm long. The sepals are mostly hidden by hairs, are ovate to elliptic, and 1 to 1.5 mm long. The corolla is 12 to 16 mm long, with hairs on the outside. The ovary (2-2.5 mm long) is humped, swollen on one side, and sometimes covered in dense intertwined hairs. The fruit is 3-4 mm diam, and humped, (swollen on one side), wrinkled, and hairy. It flowers mainly from August to November.

== Distribution and habitat ==
It is found in south-west Western Australia, on sand plains.

== Taxonomy & etymology ==
It was first described by John Lindley in 1839. The specific epithet, alata, is a Latin adjective, alatus, -a, um, meaning "having wings", or "winged".
