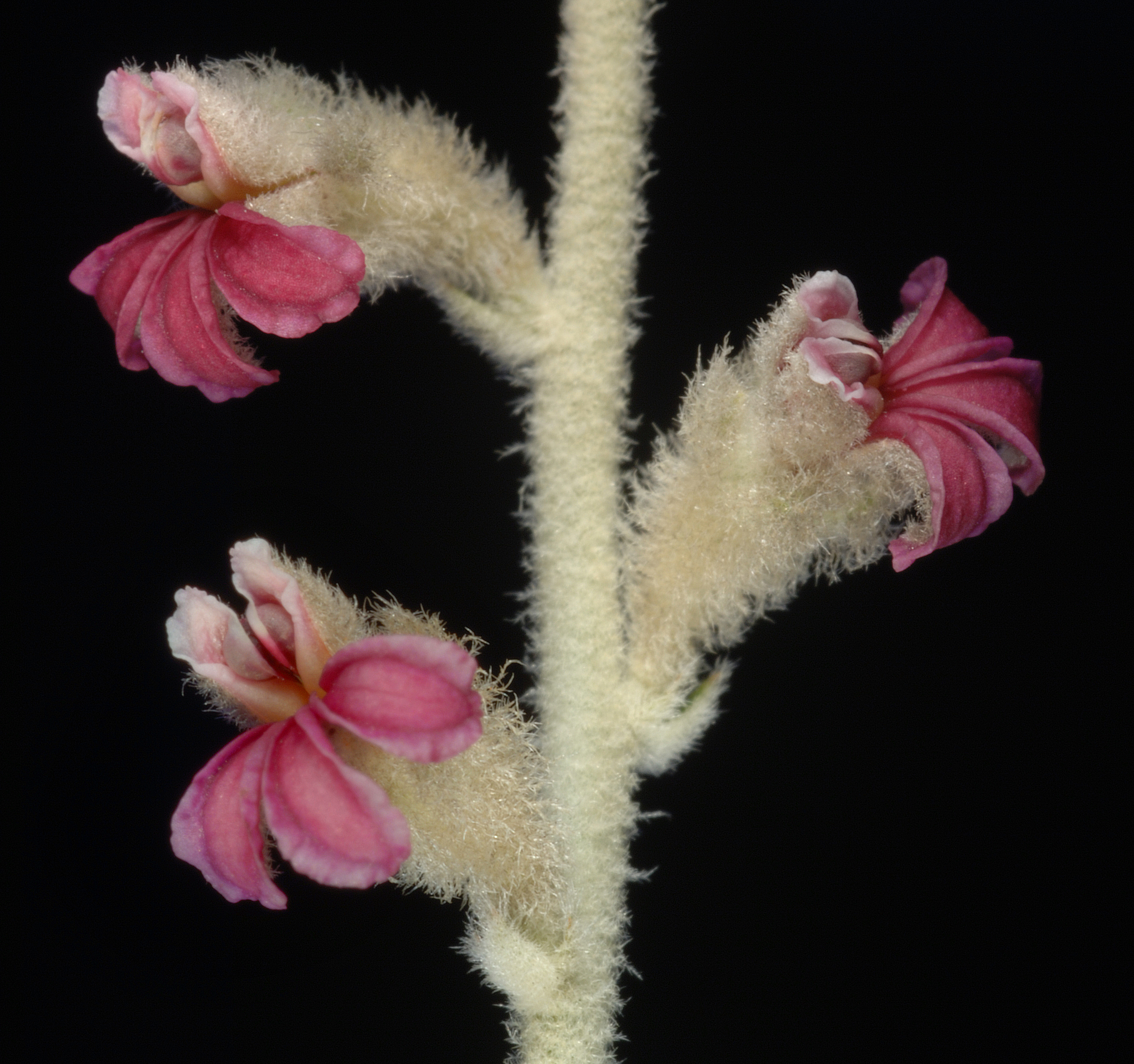

Scientific classification
- Kingdom: Plantae
- Clade: Tracheophytes
- Clade: Angiosperms
- Clade: Eudicots
- Clade: Asterids
- Order: Asterales
- Family: Goodeniaceae
- Genus: Dampiera
- Species: D. candicans

Binomial name
- Dampiera candicans F.Muell.

= Dampiera candicans =

Species of flowering plant

Dampiera candicans is a plant in the family Goodeniaceae, native to Western Australia and the Northern Territory.

== Description ==
Dampiera candicans is an erect shrub growing to a height of 70 cm tall, with stems covered in brownish or greyish dense intertwined hairs. The upper surface of the leaves usually lose their covering but may have a few large coarse hairs. The lower leaf surface is always has a covering of dense intertwined hairs. The leaf lamina is 3–35 mm by 6–19 mm wide on a stalk (petiole) which is 3–10 mm long. The flowers occur in spikes which are 13–28 cm long. The sepals are about 0.1 mm long and hidden beneath hairs. The fruit is ellipsoidal to obovoid and about 2 mm long. It flowers from April to August, and is distinguished from Dampiera cinerea by its dentate leaf margins and its longer flower spikes.

== Distribution & habitat ==
It is found in north-western Western Australia and the west of the Northern Territory, growing on sandy and lateritic soils.

== Taxonomy & etymology ==
It was first described by Ferdinand von Mueller in 1876. The specific epithet, candicans, is a Latin adjective, candicans, meaning "white", "whitish" or "having white woolly hairs".
