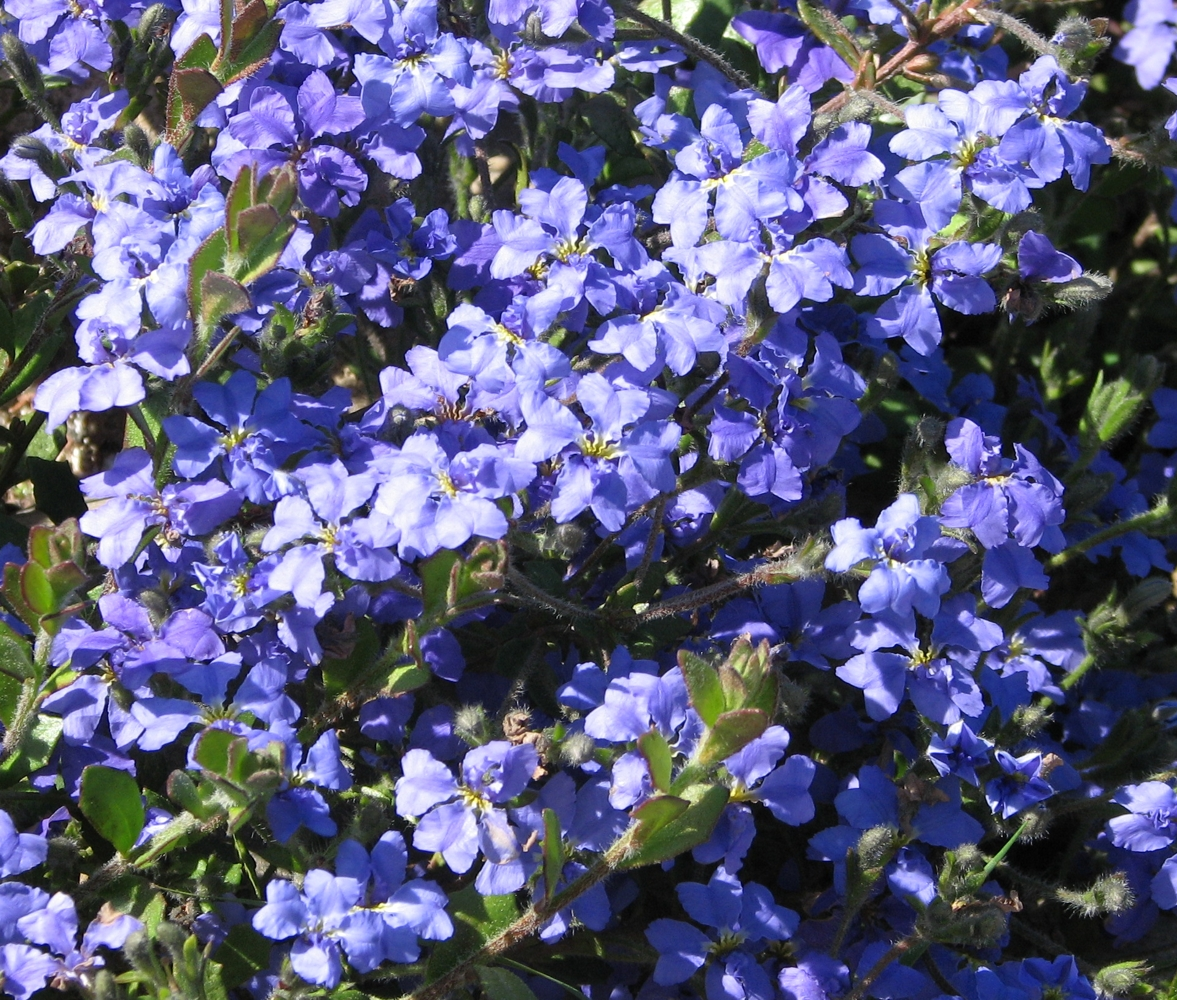

Scientific classification
- Kingdom: Plantae
- Clade: Embryophytes
- Clade: Tracheophytes
- Clade: Angiosperms
- Clade: Eudicots
- Clade: Asterids
- Order: Asterales
- Family: Goodeniaceae
- Genus: Dampiera
- Species: D. linearis

Binomial name
- Dampiera linearis R.Br.

Synonyms
- Dampiera cuneata R.Br., 1810; Dampiera eriophora de Vriese, 1845; Dampiera azurea de Vriese, 1845; Dampiera lanuginosa de Vriese, 1854

= Dampiera linearis =

Species of flowering plant

Dampiera linearis, commonly known as common dampiera or wedge-leaved dampiera, is an erect perennial herb in the family Goodeniaceae. The species, which is endemic to the south-west of Western Australia, grows to between 15 and 60 cm (6 in–2 ft) high, with its blue to purple flowers appearing between July and December. It adapts readily to cultivation, particularly containers such as hanging baskets.

== Taxonomy ==
The prolific botanist Robert Brown described Dampiera linearis in his 1810 work Prodromus Florae Novae Hollandiae et Insulae Van Diemen. Its species name is the Latin adjective linearis "linear". He described a D cuneata at the same time, which has been synonymised with D. linearis. Plants sold commercially were mislabeled as D. cuneata for many years. Dutch botanist Willem Hendrik de Vriese described two further plants—D. azurea and D. eriophora—from the Swan River and Perth environs in the 1845 work Plantae Preissianae, which are also now considered D. linearis.

== Description ==
An erect shrub, Dampiera linearis grows to between 15 and 60 cm (6 in–2 ft) in height, with a suckering habit. New growth is hairy and becomes smooth with maturity. The leaves are obovate to elliptical and can be entire or lobed, measuring 1–4 cm long by 1–10 mm wide. It produces flowers between July and December in its native range. These are 1.5–2 cm wide, and light blue to purple with a yellow or white centre. The outer- or undersurface of the flowers is covered with fine hair. The flowers arise in groups of 1 to 3 from a peduncle that is also covered in hair.

== Distribution and habitat ==
Dampiera linearis is found across the southwest corner of Western Australia from Geraldton in the north to Esperance in the south east. It grows on sand- or clay-based soils over laterite, on ridges, or flat areas.

== Ecology ==
Plants of Dampiera linearis can survive bushfire and resprout and put on new growth quickly.

Fieldwork on the Swan Coastal Plain indicated it was probably resistant to Phytophthora cinnamomi.

== Cultivation ==
Some forms of Dampiera linearis are cultivated and sold for their colourful flowers, while others have attractive grey foliage. In cultivation, the species prefers a well-drained situation in full sun or light shade. It tolerates some dryness and moderate frost. It does not tolerate waterlogged soils. It makes an attractive plant for hanging baskets.

Dampiera linearis is readily propagated by cuttings; trials at Kings Park indicate that semi-hardened material is best and the average time to strike is 48 days.
