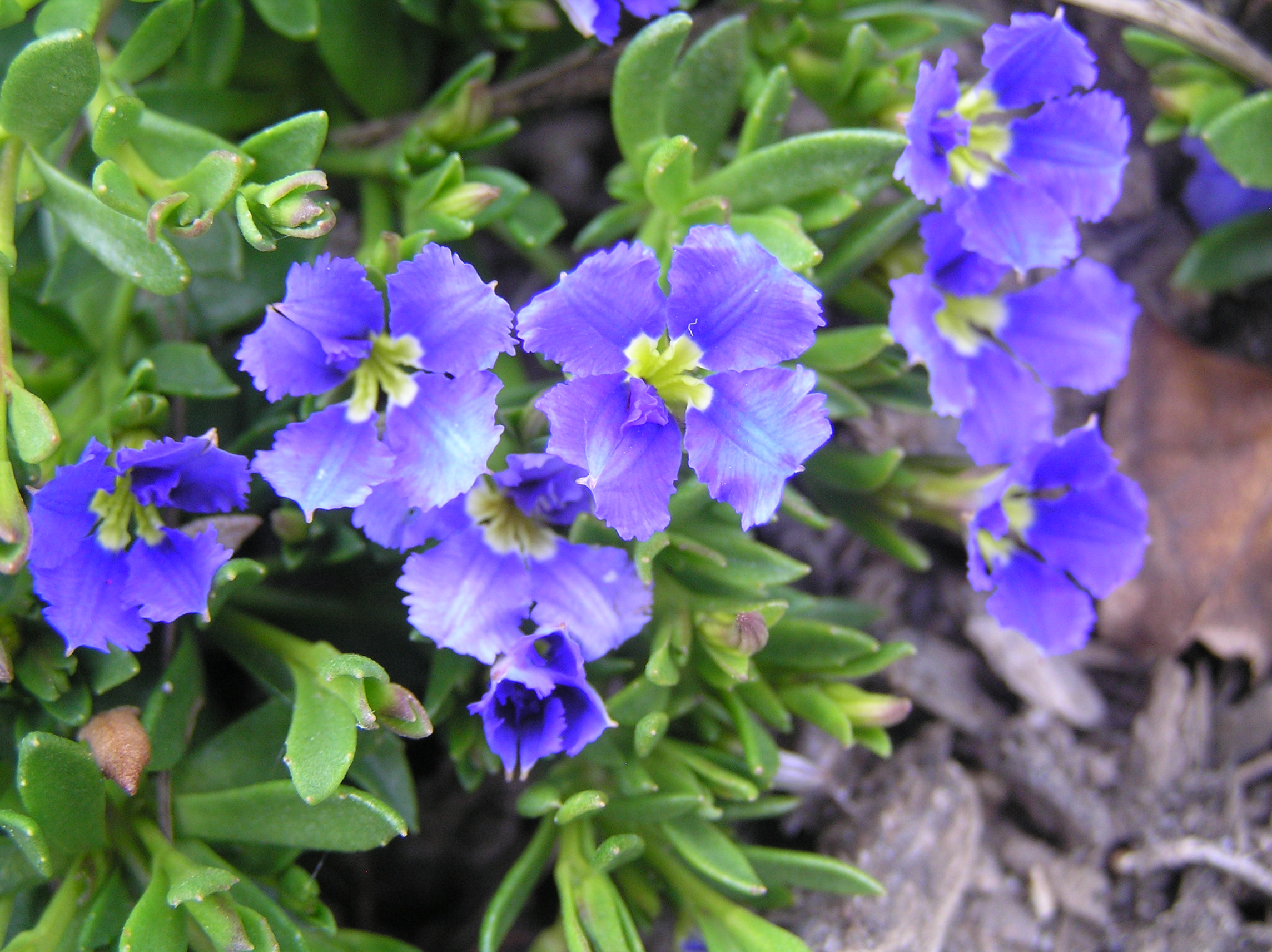

Scientific classification
- Kingdom: Plantae
- Clade: Tracheophytes
- Clade: Angiosperms
- Clade: Eudicots
- Clade: Asterids
- Order: Asterales
- Family: Goodeniaceae
- Genus: Dampiera
- Species: D. diversifolia

Binomial name
- Dampiera diversifolia de Vriese

= Dampiera diversifolia =

Species of flowering plant

Dampiera diversifolia is a subshrub in the family Goodeniaceae from the southwest of Western Australia.
