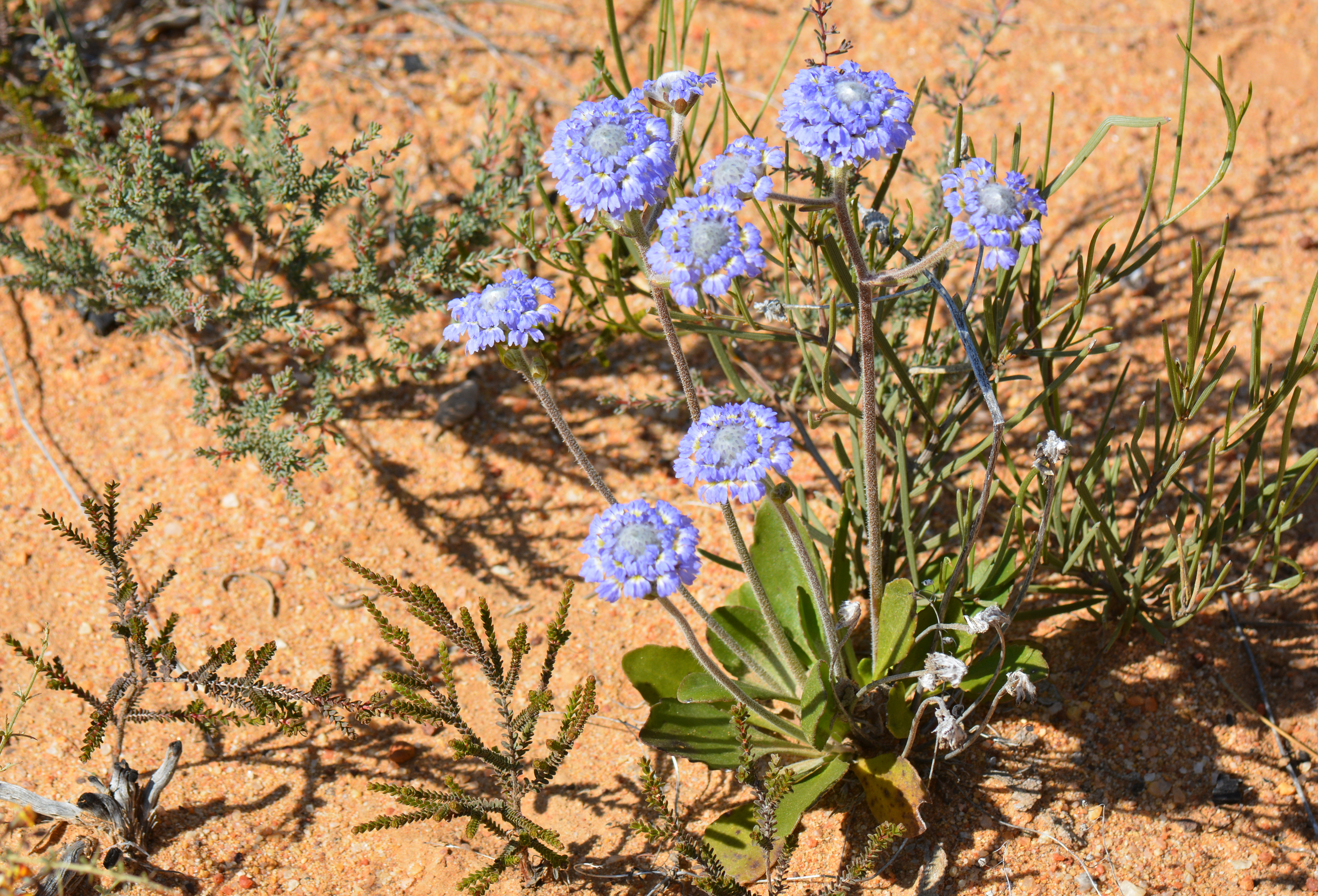

Scientific classification
- Kingdom: Plantae
- Clade: Tracheophytes
- Clade: Angiosperms
- Clade: Eudicots
- Clade: Asterids
- Order: Asterales
- Family: Goodeniaceae
- Genus: Dampiera
- Species: D. wellsiana

Binomial name
- Dampiera wellsiana F.Muell

= Dampiera wellsiana =

Species of flowering plant

Dampiera wellsiana is a herb in the family of Goodeniaceae and is one of approximately 70 species of Dampiera. Dampiera wellsiana is native to Western Australia. It is a non-threatened, stoloniferous plant and is often defined by its small blue petals and the arid climate it grows in. Botanist Ferdinand von Mueller first described the plant in 1876.

== Etymology ==
The genus name Dampiera was derived from William Dampier (1652-1715). Dampier was the first Englishman to explore Western Australia and collect native plants, including Dampiera wellsiana. It is commonly known as Well's Dampiera.

The species is dedicated to botanist Julia Wells (1842-1911), who is notable for having collected botanical specimens in the wheatbelt region of Western Australia.

== Description ==
Dampiera wellsiana is a floriferous, evergreen herb that ranges between 5 and 30 cm tall and is a perennial herb with a lifespan of over two years. Over time, the plant can grow to over 2 metres (7 ft) and its inflorescence is largely contained on the above-ground body of the plant. The leaves are flat and smooth, 2–7 cm long and 9-40mm wide. The leaf stem (petiole) is 6 cm long and unribbed with tufted hairs around its exterior and the leaves and stems are a dark green colour. The flowers gather in loose heads in thick inflorescences with thin pale to dark blue petals. These range from 2.5 to 5.8 mm long center petals to 4.5–6 mm long outer petals. The flowers have glandular, simple hairs on the exterior with dense tufts in the center. The petals serve as primary protection to the plant's androecium and gynoecium, the female and male reproductive organs.

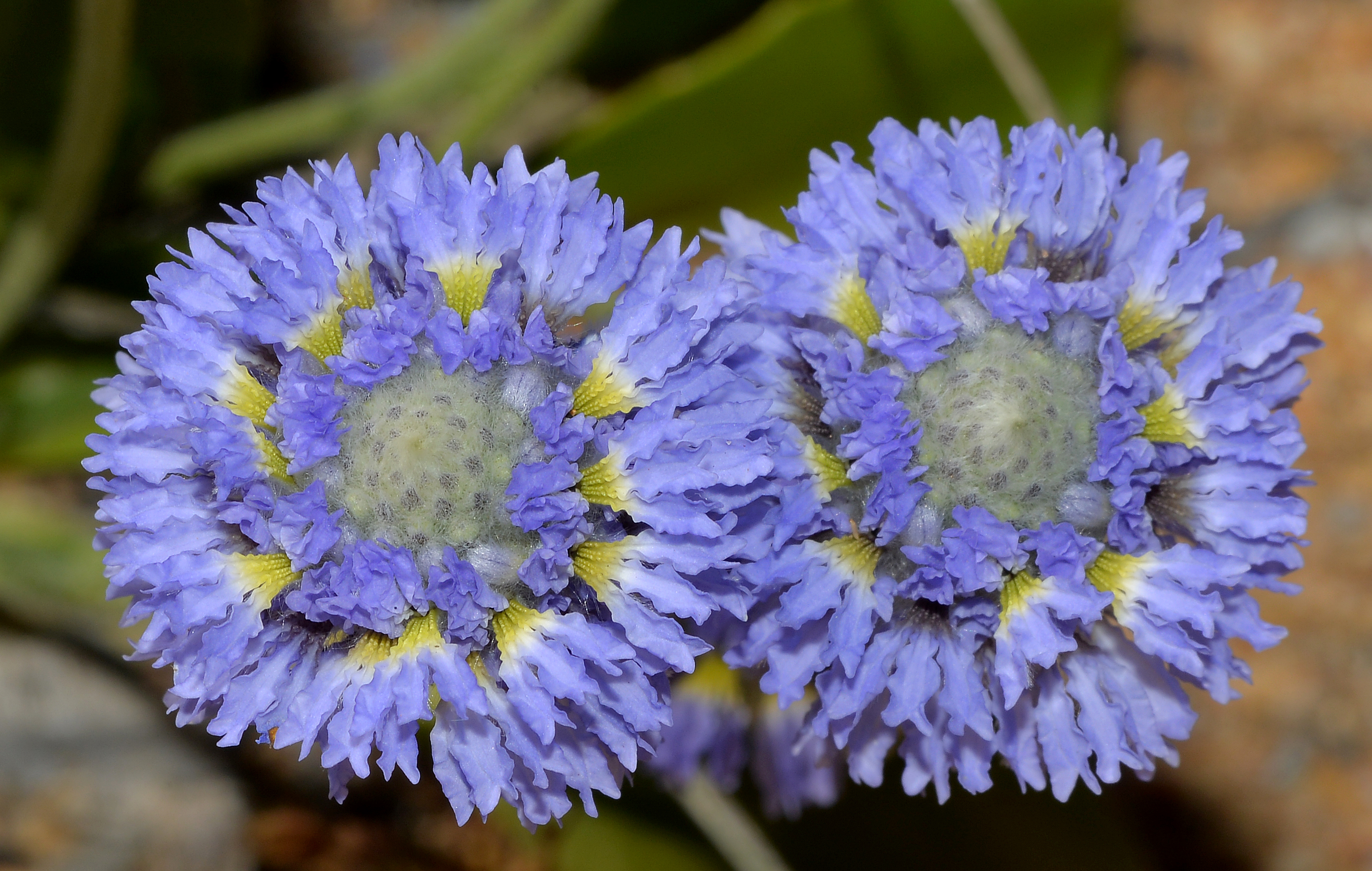
Dampiera wellsiana flower head

== Ecology ==
The flowers are morphologically designed to be pollinated by insects, including bees. When an insect probes to the bottom of the flower where the nectar is contained, the hairs around the indusium are agitated by the insect, thus releasing pollen onto the insect's body. The pollen is held on a thin membranous covering (indusium) when the flower opens, however, the pollen collection by the indusium is rather inefficient, and the pollen is often found around the outside of the indusium.

Dampiera wellsiana fruits are also indehiscent, meaning the pod or fruit does not split open to release its seed when it is ripe.

== Distribution and habitat ==
Dampiera wellsiana is endemic to South-western Australia. The herb can be found in the Beard's Provinces, IBRA Regions, IBRA Subregions and Local Government Areas such as Bruce Rock, Coolgardie, Coorow and Mount Marshall. Since 1848, Dampiera wellsiana has had a total of 268 occurrences with most through the months of September, October and November and the least in the winter months between March and June. This species of herb can only reproduce during a period of consistent humidity and within a temperature between 20 and 24 °C. It flowers in the spring and summer months of August, September, October, November and December.

Dampiera wellsiana requires a highly specific habitat to grow, requiring dry clay, stone and sandy soils in mostly flat shrublands with very low vegetation. Aboriginals traditionally call this specific type of land kwongan. Dampiera wellsiana also relies on a climate of hot, dry summers and mild winters with little rainfall. It is often found in frequently burnt or cleared areas, as they are dry areas with low vegetation. After a fire, fructification also usually increases in Dampiera wellsiana as a result of these arid conditions.

== Uses and cultivation ==
Dampiera wellsiana is an inflorescence and can be used for ornamental purposes, such as indoor decoration. The plant is not often cultivated, however it is proven suitable for rocky and desert gardens. Dampiera wellsiana is cultivated under full sunlight or under slight shade and gritty, sandy and acidic soils that provide a sufficient amount of water drainage. For ornamental and plant health purposes, the plant is lightly pruned. Several species within the Goodeniaceae family are used for medicinal and environmental purposes, however Dampiera wellsiana does not hold these properties.
