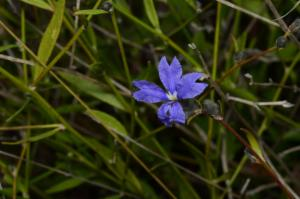

Scientific classification
- Kingdom: Plantae
- Clade: Tracheophytes
- Clade: Angiosperms
- Clade: Eudicots
- Clade: Asterids
- Order: Asterales
- Family: Goodeniaceae
- Genus: Dampiera
- Species: D. adpressa

Binomial name
- Dampiera adpressa (A.Cunn.) ex DC.

= Dampiera adpressa =

Purple beauty-bush

Species of flowering plant

Dampiera adpressa commonly known as purple beauty-bush, is a flowering plant in the family Goodeniaceae. It is a small, understory shrub with purple flowers and grows in Queensland and New South Wales.

== Description ==
Dampiera adpressa is an upright perennial understory shrub to 1 m (3 ft 3 in) high with ribbed, needle-shaped leaves. The leaves are occasionally grouped in leaf axils, mostly oval-elliptic to lance-shaped or sometimes narrowly oblong-shaped, 1.1–5.5 cm (0.43–2.17 in) long, 2–23 mm (0.079–0.906 in) wide, margins smooth or toothed and sessile. Flowering branches are in groups of 3-5, 3–12 mm (0.12–0.47 in) long, corolla 8–10 mm (0.31–0.39 in) long and covered with greyish long, soft, straight hairs. Flowering occurs in spring and summer and the fruit is smooth, 4–5 mm (0.16–0.20 in) long, more or less ribbed and wrinkly.

== Taxonomy and naming ==
Dampiera adpressa was first formally described in 1839 by Augustin Pyramus de Candolle from an unpublished description by Allan Cunningham and the description was published in Prodromus Systematis Naturalis Regni Vegetabilis. The specific epithet (adpressa) means "appressed".

== Distribution and habitat ==
Purple beauty-bush grows in forests and woodland from southern Queensland and New South Wales on the Great Dividing Range and western slopes and plains.
