= Dampiera teres =

Scientific classification
- Kingdom: Plantae
- Clade: Tracheophytes
- Clade: Angiosperms
- Clade: Eudicots
- Clade: Asterids
- Order: Asterales
- Family: Goodeniaceae
- Genus: Dampiera
- Species: D. teres

Binomial name
- Dampiera teres Lindl.

Species of flowering plant

Dampiera teres, commonly known as the terete-leaved dampiera, is an erect perennial herb in the family Goodeniaceae. The species, which is endemic to Western Australia north of Perth.
