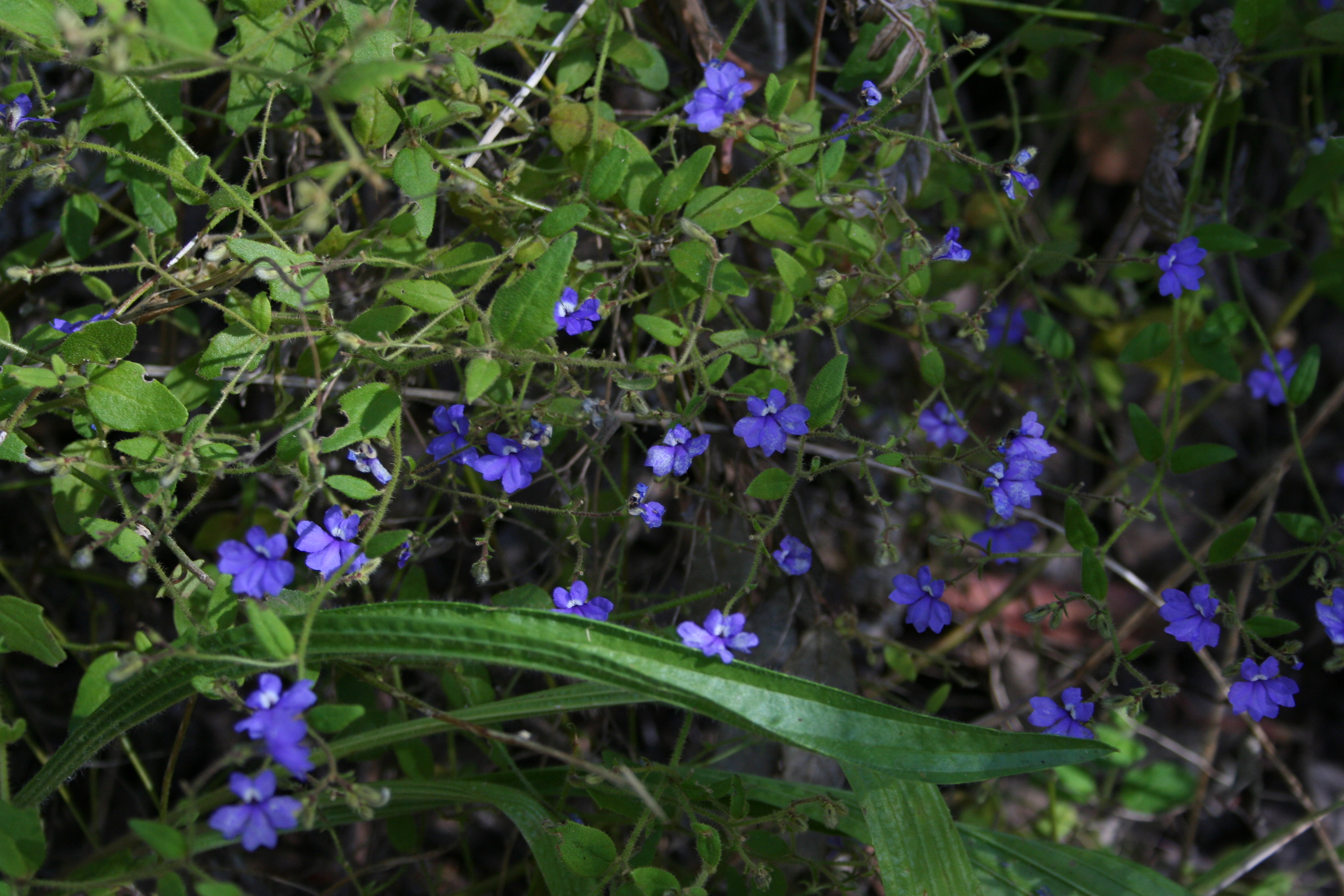

Scientific classification
- Kingdom: Plantae
- Clade: Tracheophytes
- Clade: Angiosperms
- Clade: Eudicots
- Clade: Asterids
- Order: Asterales
- Family: Goodeniaceae
- Genus: Dampiera
- Species: D. hederacea

Binomial name
- Dampiera hederacea R.Br.

= Dampiera hederacea =

Species of flowering plant

Dampiera hederacea, commonly known as the karri dampiera, is an erect perennial herb in the family Goodeniaceae. The species, which is endemic to the south-west of Western Australia, is a low spreading shrub which reaches 40 cm (16 in) across. It produces blue flowers between August and January in its native range.
