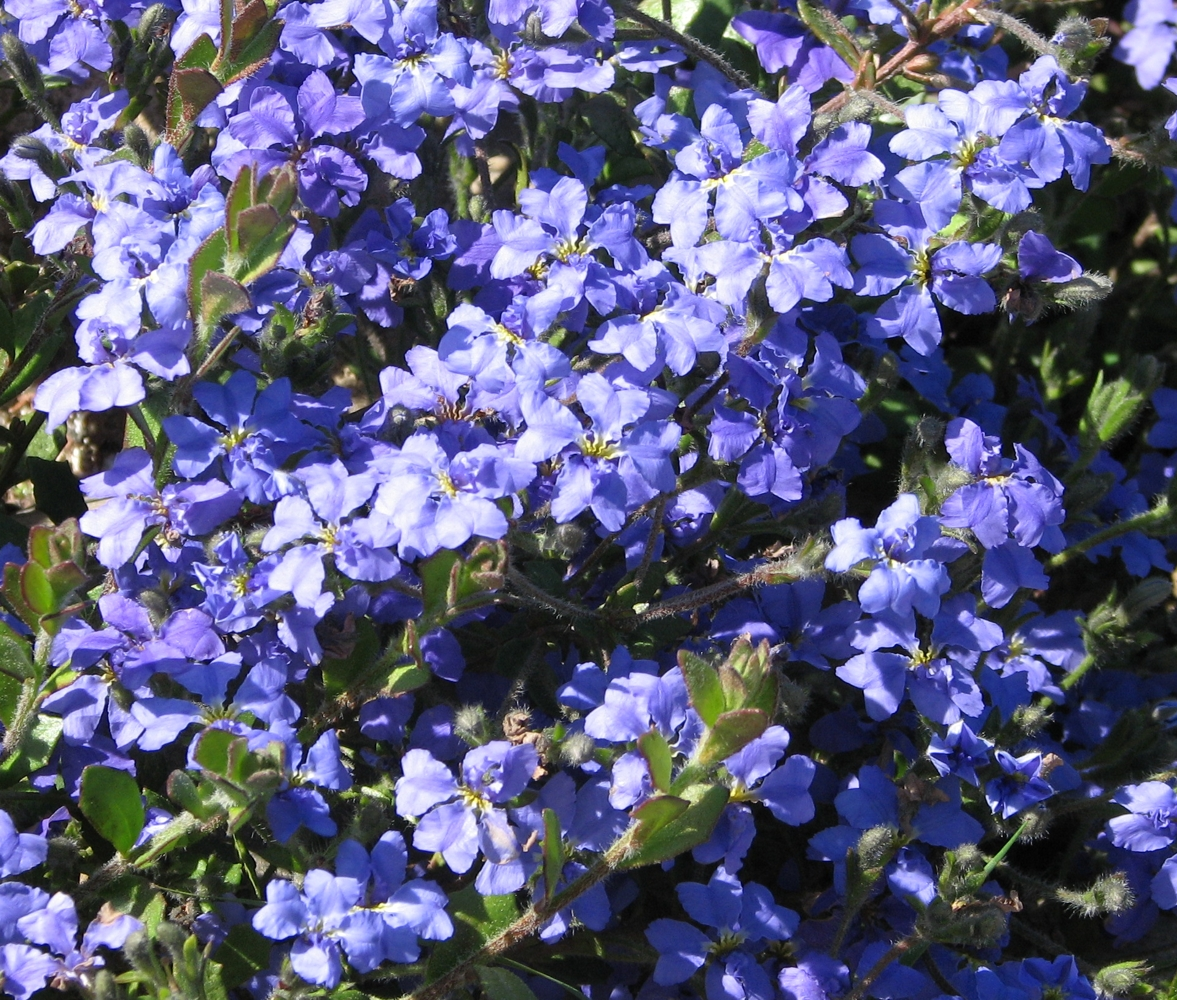
- Dampiera linearis

Scientific classification
- Kingdom: Plantae
- Clade: Tracheophytes
- Clade: Angiosperms
- Clade: Eudicots
- Clade: Asterids
- Order: Asterales
- Family: Goodeniaceae
- Genus: Dampiera; R.Br.

Species
- See text

= Dampiera =

Genus of flowering plants

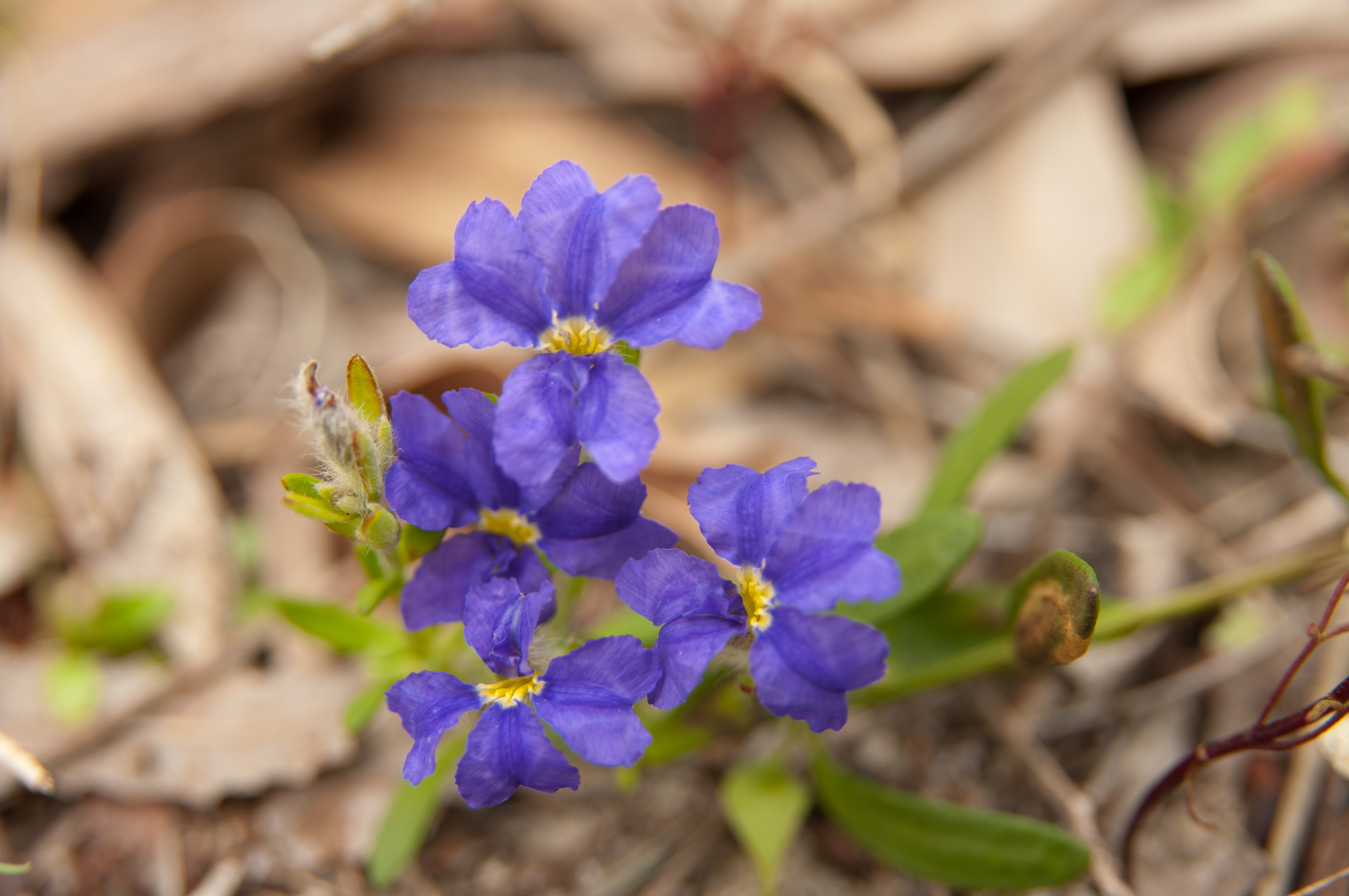
Dampiera triloba

Dampiera is a genus of about 70 species of flowering plants in the family Goodeniaceae, all of which are endemic to Australia. Plants in the genus Dampiera are subshrubs or herbs with sessile leaves, flowers with five small sepals and blue, violet or pink, rarely white, two-lipped flowers.

== Description ==
Plants in the genus Dampiera are multistemmed perennial subshrubs or herbs with a rosette of leaves, the leaves simple, sessile and sometimes with toothed edges. The flowers have five very small sepals and petals joined at the base with two "lips" with unequal lobes. The stamens form a tube around the style and are attached to the petal tube. The fruit is a nut often with parts of the flowers remaining attached, and contains a single seed.

== Taxonomy ==
The genus Dampiera was first formally described in 1810 by Robert Brown in his Prodromus Florae Novae Hollandiae et Insulae Van Diemen. The genus is named for William Dampier, an English sea captain who landed on the north-west coast of Western Australia in 1688 and 1699 and collected about twenty-five species of the first Australian plants to reach European herbaria.

== Species list ==
The following is a list of Dampiera species accepted by the Australian Plant Census as at May 2021:

- Dampiera adpressa A.Cunn. ex DC. - purple beauty-bush
- Dampiera alata Lindl. - winged-stem dampiera
- Dampiera altissima Benth. - tall dampiera
- Dampiera angulata Rajput & Carolin
- Dampiera anonyma Lepschi & Trudgen
- Dampiera atriplicina C.A.Gardner ex Rajput & Carolin
- Dampiera candicans F.Muell.
- Dampiera carinata Benth. - summer dampiera
- Dampiera cinerea Ewart & O.B.Davies
- Dampiera conospermoides W.Fitzg.
- Dampiera coronata Lindl. - wedge-leaved dampiera
- Dampiera decurrens Rajput & Carolin
- Dampiera deltoidea Rajput & Carolin
- Dampiera dentata Rajput
- Dampiera discolor (de Vriese) K.Krause
- Dampiera diversifolia de Vriese
- Dampiera dysantha (Benth.) Rajput & Carolin
- Dampiera eriantha K.Krause
- Dampiera eriocephala de Vriese - woolly-headed dampiera
- Dampiera fasciculata R.Br. - bundled-leaf dampiera
- Dampiera ferruginea R.Br.
- Dampiera fitzgeraldensis Rajput & Carolin
- Dampiera fusca Rajput & Carolin - Kydra dampiera
- Dampiera galbraithiana Rajput & Carolin
- Dampiera glabrescens Benth.
- Dampiera haematotricha de Vriese
- Dampiera hederacea R.Br. - Karri dampiera
- Dampiera heteroptera Rajput & Carolin
- Dampiera incana R.Br. - hoary dampiera
- Dampiera juncea Benth. - rush-like dampiera
- Dampiera krauseana Rajput & Carolin
- Dampiera lanceolata A.Cunn. ex DC. - grooved dampiera
- Dampiera latealata (E.Pritz.) Rajput & Carolin
- Dampiera lavandulacea Lindl.
- Dampiera leptoclada Benth. - slender-shooted dampiera
- Dampiera lindleyi de Vriese
- Dampiera linearis R.Br. - common dampiera
- Dampiera loranthifolia F.Muell. ex Benth.
- Dampiera luteiflora F.Muell. - yellow dampiera
- Dampiera marifolia Benth.
- Dampiera metallorum Lepschi & Trudgen
- Dampiera obliqua Rajput & Carolin
- Dampiera oligophylla Benth. - sparse-leaved dampiera
- Dampiera orchardii Rajput & Carolin
- Dampiera parvifolia R.Br. - many-bracted dampiera
- Dampiera pedunculata Rajput & Carolin
- Dampiera plumosa S.Moore
- Dampiera purpurea R.Br. - purple dampiera
- Dampiera ramosa Rajput & Carolin
- Dampiera rosmarinifolia Schltdl.
- Dampiera roycei Rajput
- Dampiera sacculata F.Muell. ex Benth. - pouched dampiera
- Dampiera salahae Rajput & Carolin
- Dampiera scaevolina C.A.Gardner ex Rajput & Carolin
- Dampiera scottiana F.Muell.
- Dampiera sericantha F.Muell. ex Benth.
- Dampiera spicigera Benth. - spiked dampiera
- Dampiera stenophylla K.Krause
- Dampiera stenostachya E.Pritz. - narrow-spiked dampiera
- Dampiera stricta (Sm.) R.Br. - blue dampiera
- Dampiera sylvestris Rajput & Carolin
- Dampiera tenuicaulis E.Pritz. - slender-stemmed dampiera
- Dampiera tephrea Rajput & Carolin
- Dampiera teres Lindl. - terete-leaved dampiera
- Dampiera tomentosa K.Krause - felted dampiera
- Dampiera trigona de Vriese - angled-stem dampiera
- Dampiera triloba Lindl.
- Dampiera wellsiana F.Muell. - Wells' dampiera

== Distribution ==
Species of Dampiera occur in all Australian States, the Northern Territory and the Australian Capital Territory.
