= Dampiera eriocephala =

Scientific classification
- Kingdom: Plantae
- Clade: Tracheophytes
- Clade: Angiosperms
- Clade: Eudicots
- Clade: Asterids
- Order: Asterales
- Family: Goodeniaceae
- Genus: Dampiera
- Species: D. eriocephala

Binomial name
- Dampiera eriocephala de Vriese

Species of flowering plant

Dampiera eriocephala, commonly known as the woolly-headed dampiera, is an erect perennial herb in the family Goodeniaceae. The species, which is endemic to Western Australia.
