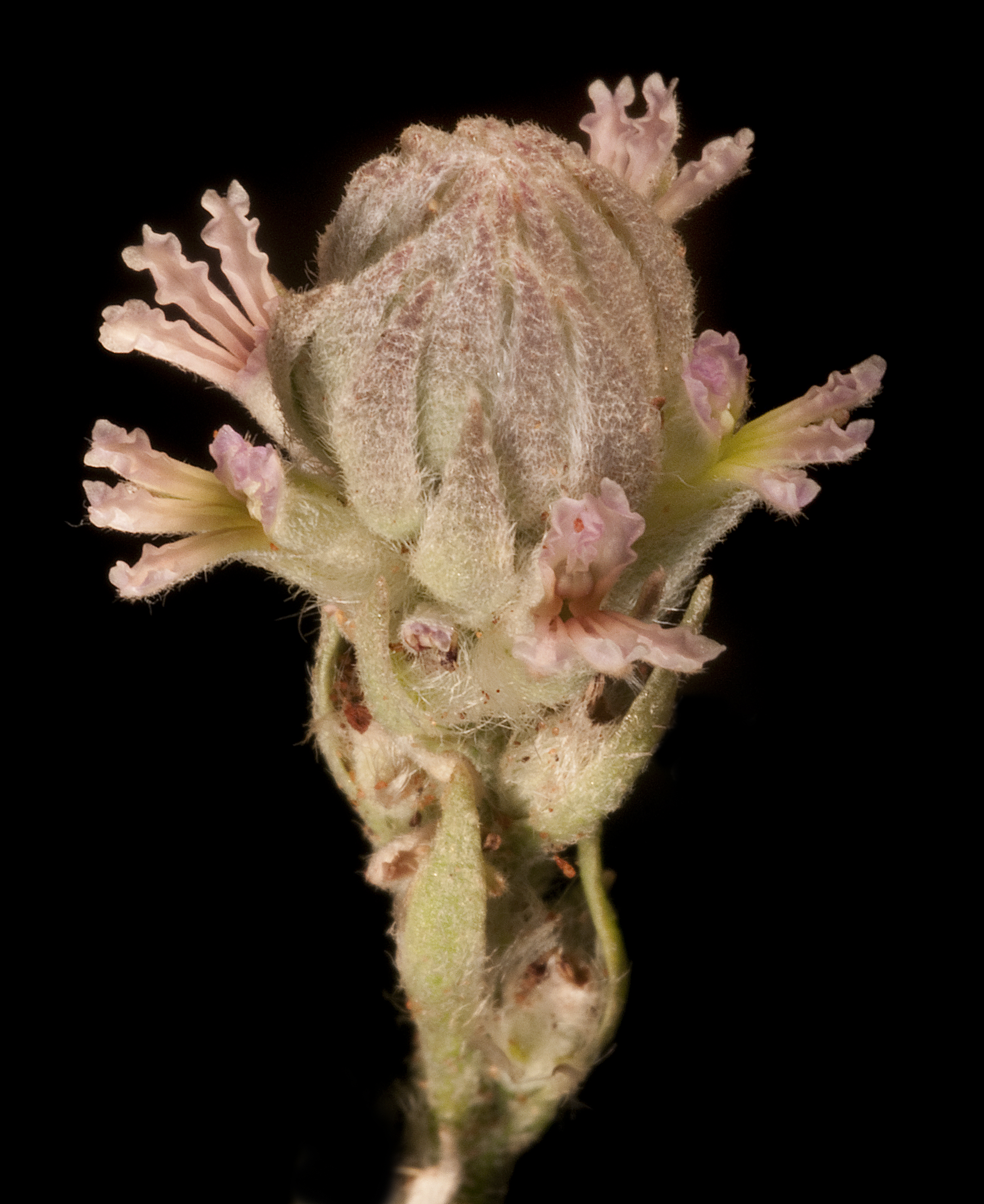

Conservation status
- Near Threatened (TPWCA)

Scientific classification
- Kingdom: Plantae
- Clade: Tracheophytes
- Clade: Angiosperms
- Clade: Eudicots
- Clade: Asterids
- Order: Asterales
- Family: Goodeniaceae
- Genus: Dampiera
- Species: D. dentata

Binomial name
- Dampiera dentata Rajput

= Dampiera dentata =

Species of flowering plant

Dampiera dentata is a plant in the family Goodeniaceae, native to Western Australia and the Northern Territory.

== Description ==
Dampiera dentata is a perennial herb growing up to 40 cm, with no surface covering except for the inflorescence. The basal leaves are stalkless (sessile) and conspicuously toothed. The leaf blade is 5-16 cm by 3-15 mm. The flowers are stalkless, and arranged in heads which lengthen into spikes which are up to 15 cm long when in fruit. The sepals are just tufts of silky hairs. The corolla is 5-6 mm long with silky hairs on the outside. The ovary is 2 to 2.5 mm long, and the fruit is ellipsoidal and about 2 mm in diameter. It mainly flowers from September to November.

== Distribution and habitat ==
It is found in central Western Australia and in the far south-west of the Northern Territory, on screes, and gravels and sandy soils.

== Conservation status ==
In the Northern Territory it has been classified as "Near threatened".

== Taxonomy & etymology ==
It was first described by Muhammad Tahir M. Rajput in 1980. The specific epithet, dentata, is a Latin adjective, dentatus, -a, um, meaning "having teeth", "toothed", or "dentate", which is derived from the Latin noun, dens ("tooth").
