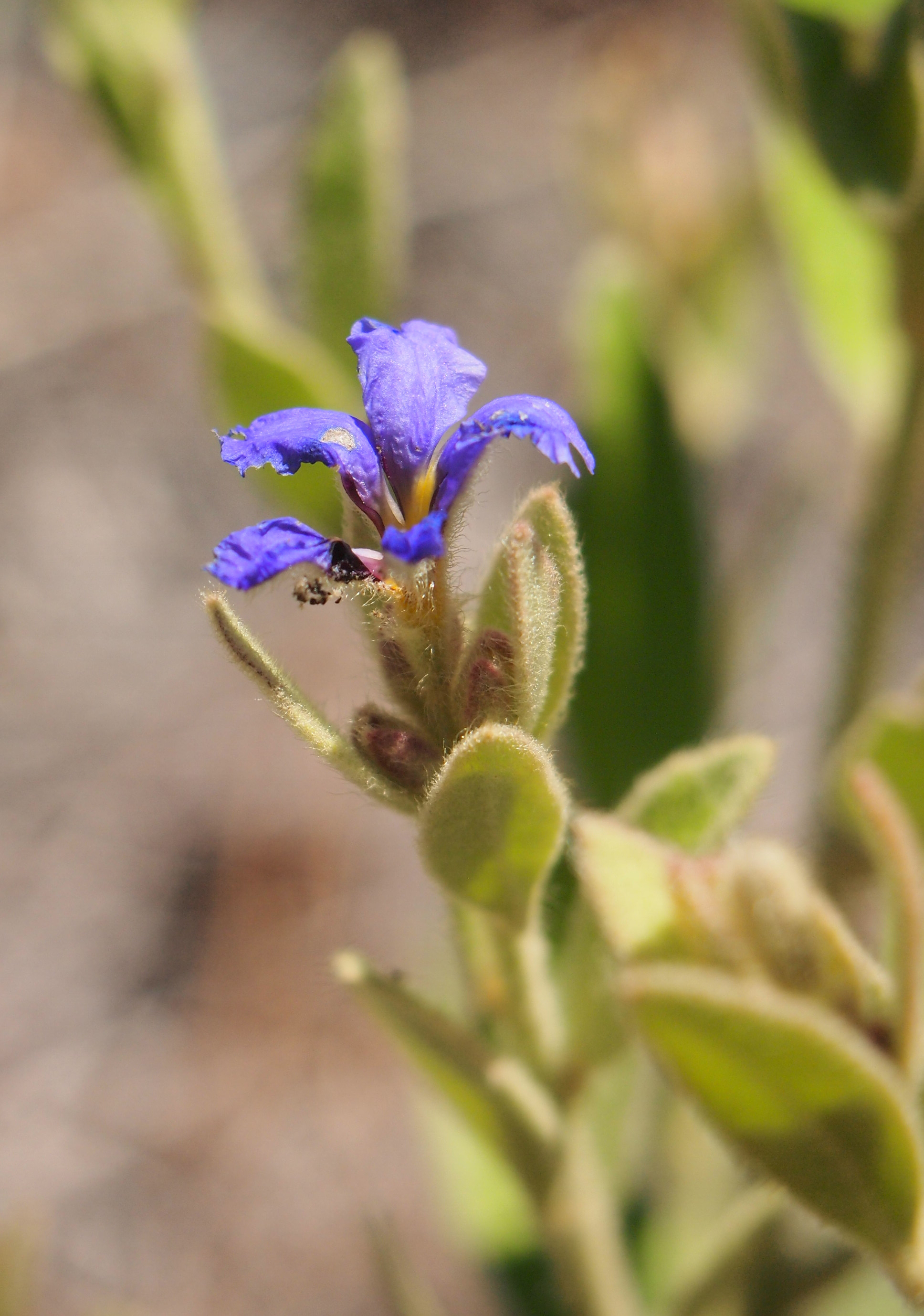

Scientific classification
- Kingdom: Plantae
- Clade: Tracheophytes
- Clade: Angiosperms
- Clade: Eudicots
- Clade: Asterids
- Order: Asterales
- Family: Goodeniaceae
- Genus: Dampiera
- Species: D. ferruginea

Binomial name
- Dampiera ferruginea R.Br.

= Dampiera ferruginea =

Velvet beauty-bush

Species of flowering plant

Dampiera ferruginea commonly known as velvet beauty-bush, is a flowering plant in the family Goodeniaceae and is endemic to Queensland. It is a small, upright shrub with blue flowers.

== Description ==
Dampiera ferruginea is an upright perennial to 1 m (3 ft 3 in) high and covered with dense, loose, matted brownish hairs. The leaves are sessile or with a short petiole, 11–46 mm (0.43–1.81 in) long, 6–25 mm (0.24–0.98 in) wide, oval to elliptic-shaped, margins entire or slightly scalloped and covered with short, matted, star-shaped hairs. The flowers are borne on a single branch in a cluster of 2-4 blue flowers, corolla 10–12 mm (0.39–0.47 in) long, outer surface densely covered with brownish hairs, bracteoles elliptic to oval-shaped, 7–10 mm (0.28–0.39 in) long and the pedicel 1–2 mm (0.039–0.079 in) long. Flowering may occur throughout the year.

== Taxonomy and naming ==
Dampiera ferruginea was first formally described in 1810 by Robert Brown and the description was published in Prodromus Florae Novae Hollandiae et Insulae Van Diemen. The specific epithet (ferruginea) means "rust-coloured".

== Distribution and habitat ==
Velvet beauty-bush grows in swamps and sclerophyll forest south of Cape York Peninsula to central Queensland and coastal locations and the Great Dividing Range.
