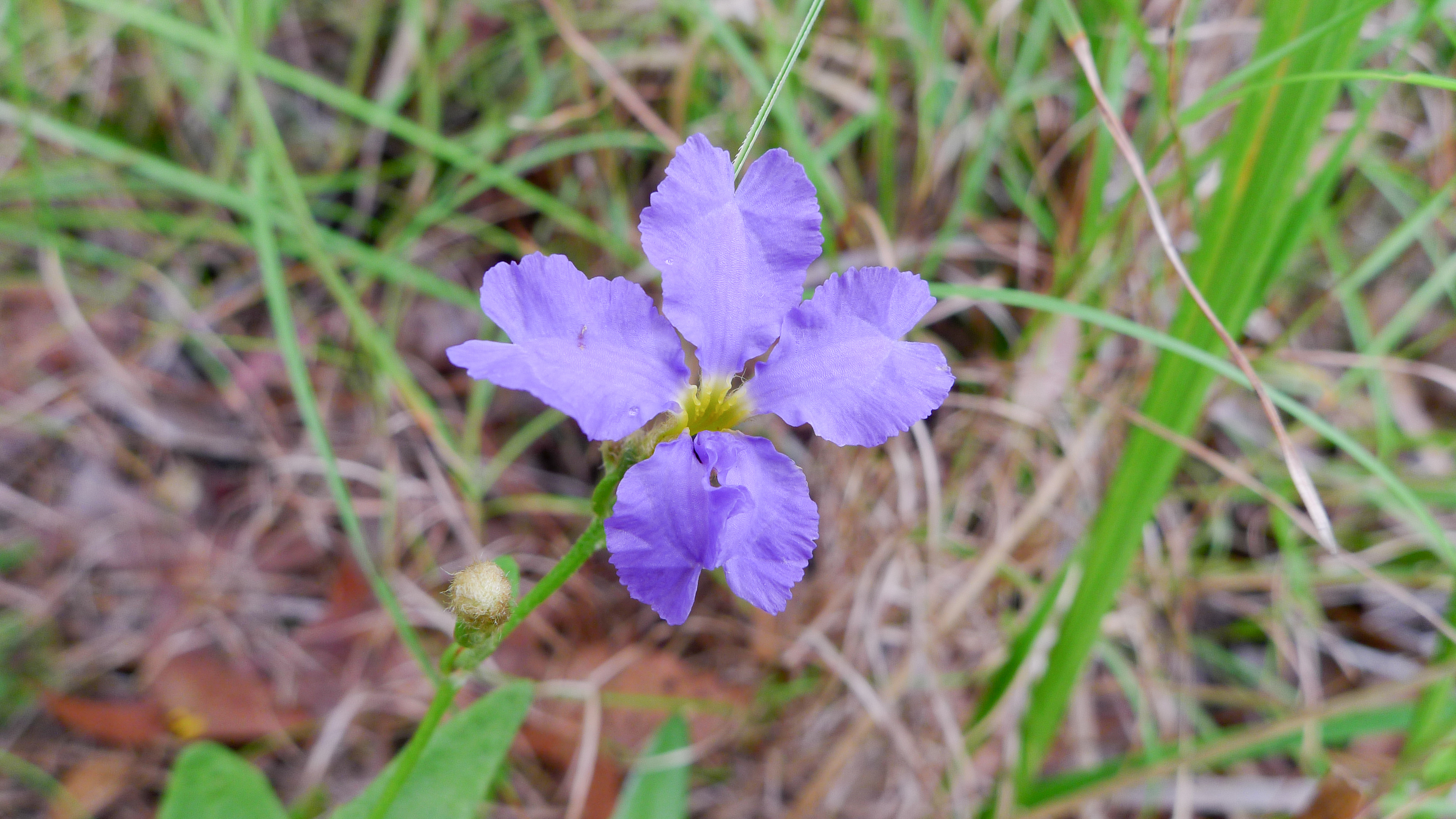

Scientific classification
- Kingdom: Plantae
- Clade: Tracheophytes
- Clade: Angiosperms
- Clade: Eudicots
- Clade: Asterids
- Order: Asterales
- Family: Goodeniaceae
- Genus: Dampiera
- Species: D. stricta

Binomial name
- Dampiera stricta R.Br.

Synonyms
- List: Dampiera oblongata R.Br. Dampiera stricta (Sm.) R.Br. var. stricta Dampiera stricta var. laxa Benth. Dampiera stricta var. oblongata (R.Br.) Benth. Goodenia stricta Sm.

= Dampiera stricta =

Blue dampiera

Species of flowering plant

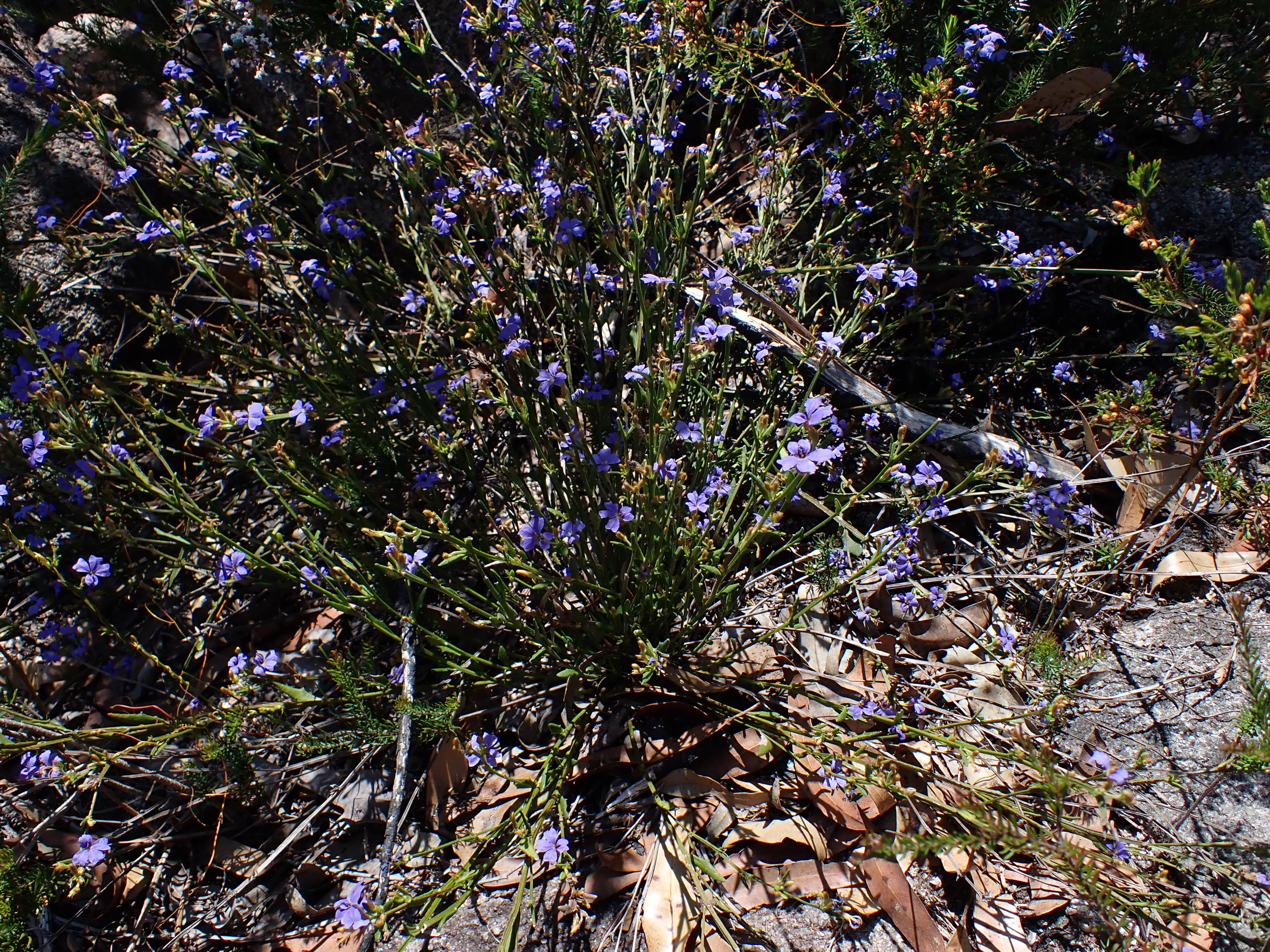
Habit in the Gibraltar Range National Park

Dampiera stricta commonly known as blue dampiera, is a flowering plant in the family Goodeniaceae. It is a small sub-shrub with variable leaves and mostly blue, mauve or purple flowers.

== Description ==
Dampiera stricta is an erect, slender, subshrub growing to about 90 cm (35 in) with ribbed, triangular, smooth or becoming smooth stems. The leaves are variable, mostly narrow-elliptic or lance-shaped, 16–50 mm (0.63–1.97 in) long, 2–20 mm (0.079–0.787 in) wide, margins smooth or toothed and sessile. The flowers are borne in leaf axils either singly or in pairs, up to 3 cm (1.2 in) long, pedicels 1–2 mm (0.039–0.079 in) long and the small linear bracts 2.5–3 mm (0.098–0.118 in) long. The corolla is 10–12 mm (0.39–0.47 in) long, blue to purple with a whitish centre, rusty coloured hairs on the outside, wings 2–2.7 mm (0.079–0.106 in) wide, upper petals smaller and the sepals 0.7–1.2 mm (0.028–0.047 in) long. Flowering occurs mainly from August to January and the fruit is a rounded oblong shape, 4–5 mm (0.16–0.20 in) long, ribbed and covered in rusty coloured hairs.

== Taxonomy and naming ==
Dampiera stricta was first formally described in 1810 by Robert Brown and the description was published in Prodromus Florae Novae Hollandiae et Insulae Van Diemen. The specific epithet (stricta) means "straight" or "erect".

== Distribution and habitat ==
Blue dampiera is a common species usually growing in open forest and heath on sandy, gravel or loamy soils in New South Wales, Queensland and Victoria on the Great Dividing Range and coastal locations.
