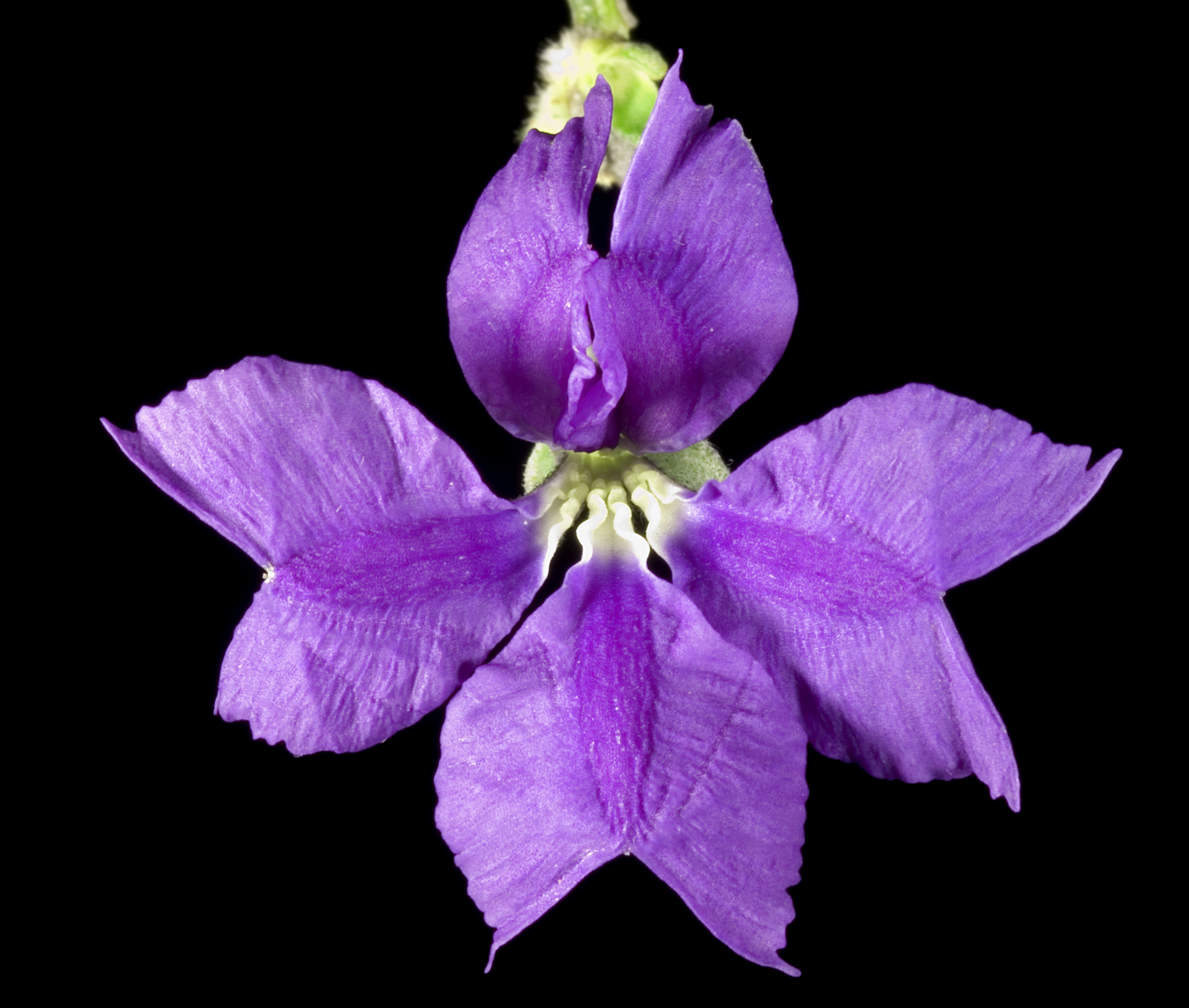

Scientific classification
- Kingdom: Plantae
- Clade: Tracheophytes
- Clade: Angiosperms
- Clade: Eudicots
- Clade: Asterids
- Order: Asterales
- Family: Goodeniaceae
- Genus: Dampiera
- Species: D. lavandulacea

Binomial name
- Dampiera lavandulacea Lindl.

= Dampiera lavandulacea =

Species of flowering plant

Dampiera lavandulacea is a flowering plant in the family Goodeniaceae and is endemic to Western Australia. It is a small, upright shrub with blue flowers.

== Description ==
Dampiera lavandulacea is an upright or ascending perennial to 70 cm (28 in) high with ribbed, smooth stems. The leaves are sessile, 9–21 mm (0.35–0.83 in) long, 2–11 mm (0.079–0.433 in) wide, oblong to elliptic shaped, rolled under, smooth on upper surface and densely covered with white, short, matted hairs on the lower surface, margins smooth or occasionally with a few teeth, 9–21 mm (0.35–0.83 in) long and 2–11 mm (0.079–0.433 in) wide. The flowers are borne singly in lower leaf axils or up 3 in a cluster in upper axils, pedicel 0.5–1 mm (0.020–0.039 in) long, bracts linear to oblong-shaped and 4–7 mm (0.16–0.28 in) long. The corolla is 10–15 mm (0.39–0.59 in) long, usually blue-lavender with a white centre and the wings 2.5–3 mm (0.098–0.118 in) wide. Flowering occurs in July or September to November and the fruit is egg-shaped up to 4 mm (0.16 in) long.

== Taxonomy and naming ==
Dampiera lavandulacea was first formally described in 1839 by John Lindley and the description was published in A Sketch of the Vegetation of the Swan River Colony. The specific epithet (lavandulacea) means "lavender".

== Distribution and habitat ==
This dampiera is a widespread species growing in south-western Western Australia from coastal areas and to the Eastern Goldfields on sand in heath and woodland.
