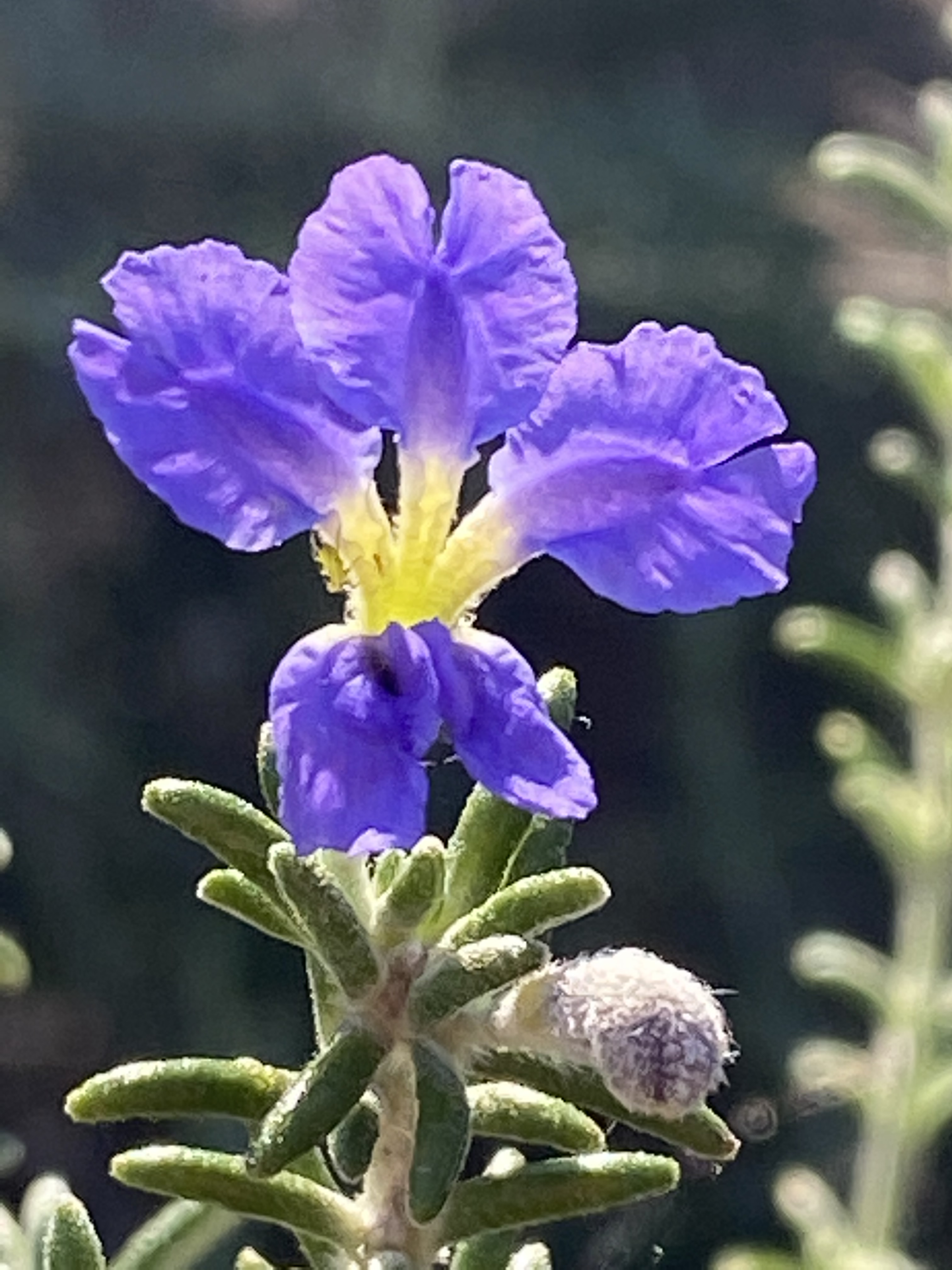

Scientific classification
- Kingdom: Plantae
- Clade: Tracheophytes
- Clade: Angiosperms
- Clade: Eudicots
- Clade: Asterids
- Order: Asterales
- Family: Goodeniaceae
- Genus: Dampiera
- Species: D. rosmarinifolia

Binomial name
- Dampiera rosmarinifolia Schltdl.

= Dampiera rosmarinifolia =

Rosemary dampiera

Species of plant

Dampiera rosmarinifolia, commonly known as rosemary dampiera, is a flowering plant in the family Goodeniaceae.It is a perennial subshrub with linear leaves, mauve or purple flowers borne in leaf axils.

== Description ==
Dampiera rosmarinifolia is an upright or prostrate perennial subshrub to 60 cm (24 in) high. It has ribbed, needle-shaped stems with whitish branched hairs, often becoming smooth with age. The leaves are linear to elliptic, 9–26 mm (0.35–1.02 in) long and 2–5 mm (0.079–0.197 in) wide, mostly sessile and crowded, often in clusters from the same leaf node, smooth and glossy on upper surface, underside with short, soft hairs and rolled margins. The inflorescence usually with a single flower, up to 3 flowers in upper leaf axils each on a pedicel 3–5 mm (0.12–0.20 in) long. The bracteoles narrowly elliptic, 1–2 mm (0.039–0.079 in) long, sepals 1–1.5 mm (0.039–0.059 in) long and short, matted hairs. The corolla is purple-blue or pink inside, tube about 1.6 mm (0.063 in) long and flattened grey to black hairs on the outside. The posterior lobes are narrowly curved to oblong, 4–5 mm (0.16–0.20 in) long, anterior lobes narrowly lance-shaped, 4–6 mm (0.16–0.24 in) long. Flowering occurs usually August to November and the fruit is egg-shaped, narrower end at the base, grey, hairy and 2–4 mm (0.079–0.157 in) long.

== Taxonomy and naming ==
Dampiera rosmarinifolia was first formally described in 1847 by Diederich Franz Leonhard von Schlechtendal and the description was published in Linnaea: ein Journal für die Botanik in ihrem ganzen Umfange, oder Beiträge zur Pflanzenkunde. The specific epithet (rosmarinifolia) means "rosemary leaved".

== Distribution and habitat ==
Rosemary dampiera grows usually in low-rainfall areas in mallee, scrub and sandy soils in north-western Victoria to the Eyre Peninsula in South Australia.
