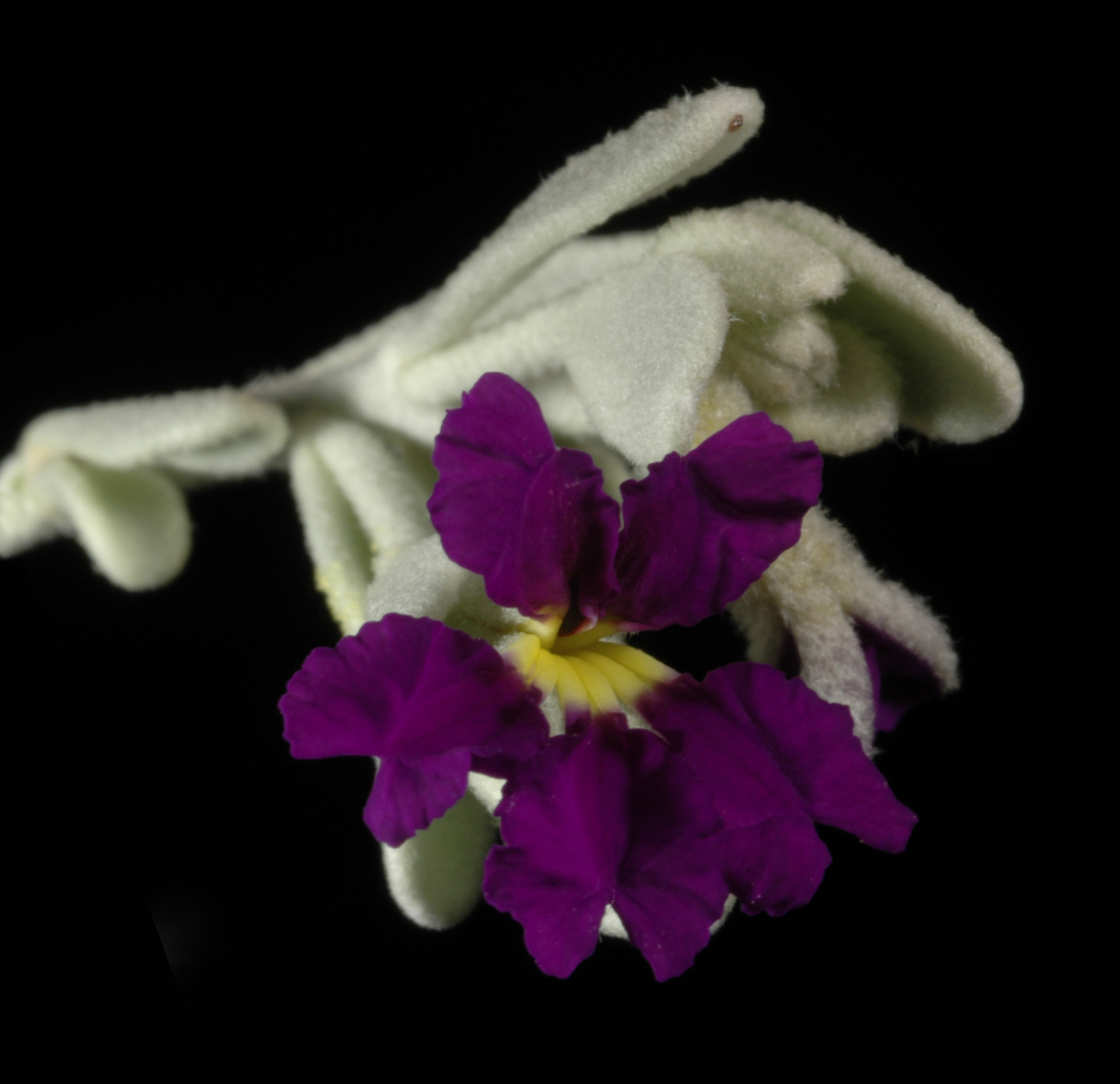

Scientific classification
- Kingdom: Plantae
- Clade: Tracheophytes
- Clade: Angiosperms
- Clade: Eudicots
- Clade: Asterids
- Order: Asterales
- Family: Goodeniaceae
- Genus: Dampiera
- Species: D. incana

Binomial name
- Dampiera incana R.Br.

Synonyms
- Dampiera incana var. incana (R.Br.)

= Dampiera incana =

Hoary dampiera

Species of plant

Dampiera incana, commonly known as the hoary dampiera, is a flowering plant in the family Goodeniaceae and is endemic to Western Australia. It is a perennial herb with grey foliage and blue-purple flowers.

== Description ==
Dampiera incana is an upright, many-branched perennial 3–45 cm (1.2–17.7 in) high with whitish to grey hairs. The leaves are oval to oblong-elliptic shaped, margins smooth or toothed, upper and lower surfaces densely covered in short matted hairs, 7–63 mm (0.28–2.48 in) long, 4–15 mm (0.16–0.59 in) wide and sessile. The mostly single inflorescence are borne in clusters in leaf axils on a branch 4.5 mm (0.18 in) long, individual flowers on a pedicel 0.5–1.5 mm (0.020–0.059 in) long, bracteoles 2.5–4 mm (0.098–0.157 in) long and oblong-elliptic shaped. The corolla is 6–9 mm (0.24–0.35 in) long, wings 2.7–3.5 mm (0.11–0.14 in) long. Flowering occurs in February, April to September or December and the fruit is egg-shaped, 2–3 mm (0.079–0.118 in) long and becoming smooth in patches.

== Taxonomy and naming ==
Dampiera incana was first formally described in 1810 by Robert Brown and the description was published in Prodromus florae Novae Hollandiae et insulae Van-Diemen, exhibens characteres plantarum quas annis 1802-1805. The specific epithet (incana) means "grey, hoary".

== Distribution and habitat ==
Hoary dampiera grows in a variety of situations including sand and limestone on sand dunes, flats and plains.
