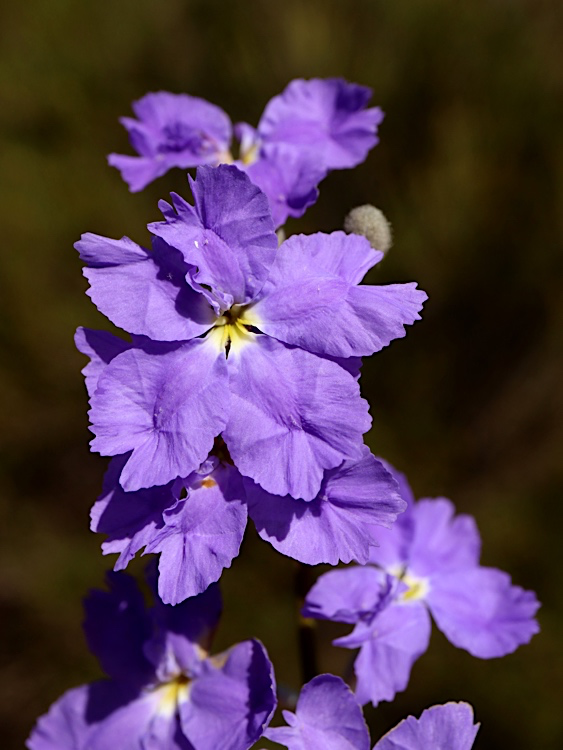

Scientific classification
- Kingdom: Plantae
- Clade: Tracheophytes
- Clade: Angiosperms
- Clade: Eudicots
- Clade: Asterids
- Order: Asterales
- Family: Goodeniaceae
- Genus: Dampiera
- Species: D. juncea

Binomial name
- Dampiera juncea Benth.

= Dampiera juncea =

Rush-like dampiera

Species of flowering plant

Dampiera juncea commonly known as rush-like dampiera, is a flowering plant in the family Goodeniaceae and is endemic to Western Australia. It is a small, upright perennial with blue-purple flowers.

== Description ==
Dampiera juncea is an upright perennial to 60 cm (24 in) high, becoming smooth except the flowers and the stems are slightly ribbed. The leaves are sessile, linear to needle-shaped to lance-shaped, dense, smooth or covered in occasional soft hairs, 3–50 mm (0.12–1.97 in) long and 1–20 mm (0.039–0.787 in) wide. The flowers are usually on solitary branches, up to 3 in a cluster, 12 mm (0.47 in) long, corolla blue-purple, pedicel up to 2 mm (0.079 in) long, bracteoles oblong-shaped and up to 3 mm (0.12 in) long. Flowering occurs mostly from August to November and the fruit is cylinder-shaped and up to 7 mm (0.28 in) long.

== Taxonomy and naming ==
Dampiera juncea was first formally described in 1868 by George Bentham and the description was published in Flora Australiensis. The specific epithet (juncea) means "rush-like".

== Distribution and habitat ==
Rush-like dampiera grows inland on sandy, clay or gravelly soils in south-western Western Australia.
