= 2017 Honkbal Hoofdklasse season =

- Association: KNBSB
- League: Honkbal Hoofdklasse
- Sport: Baseball
- Duration: April 13 – October 8
- Number of teams: 7

Regular season
- Season champions: L&D Amsterdam
- Season MVP: Danny Rombley

Holland Series
- Champions: Curaçao Neptunus
- Runners-up: L&D Amsterdam

Honkbal Hoofdklasse seasons
- ← 2016 2018 →

The 2017 Honkbal Hoofdklasse season is the 87th season of baseball in the Netherlands.

== Clubs ==

Team	City	Stadium	Ref
DSS	Haarlem	Pim Mulier Sportpark	
Curaçao Neptunus	Rotterdam	Neptunus Familiestadion	
L&D Amsterdam	Amsterdam	Sportpark Ookmeer	
De Glaskoning Twins	Oosterhout	Slotbosse toren Park	
HCAW	Bussum	Sportvallei	
UVV	Utrecht	Sportpark De Paperclip	
Vaessen Pioniers	Hoofddorp	Sportpark Pioniers	

Seven teams participated in the 2017 season.

== Regular season ==
Pos	Team	Pld	W	D	L	RF	RA	RD	Pts	Qualification or relegation
1	L&D Amsterdam	36	29	1	6	274	93	+181	59	Qualification for the Play-off
2	Curaçao Neptunus	36	26	1	9	279	140	+139	53	Qualification for the Play-off
3	Hoofddorp Pioniers	36	20	2	14	200	158	+42	42	Qualification for the Play-off
4	HCAW	36	20	2	14	168	146	+22	42	Qualification for the Play-off
5	DSS	36	13	0	23	153	287	−134	26	Qualification for the Relegation/promotion play-offs
6	Pickles UVV	36	7	3	26	140	243	−103	15	Qualification for the Relegation/promotion play-offs
7	De Glaskoning Twins	36	6	1	29	138	284	−146	13	Qualification for the Relegation/promotion play-offs

Source: https://www.honkbalsite.com/

== Play-off ==
Pos	Team	Pld	W	D	L	RF	RA	RD	Pts	Qualification or relegation
1	L&D Amsterdam	18	14	0	4	108	60	+48	28	Qualification for the Holland Series
2	Curaçao Neptunus	18	13	0	5	103	68	+35	26	Qualification for the Holland Series
3	Hoofddorp Pioniers	18	6	0	12	81	116	−35	12	
4	HCAW	18	3	0	15	81	129	−48	6	

Source: https://www.honkbalsite.com/

== Relegation/promotion play-offs ==
Pos	Team	Pld	W	D	L	RF	RA	RD	Pts	Qualification or relegation
1	De Glaskoning Twins	10	9	0	1	64	30	+34	18	Promotion to the Honkbal Hoofdklasse
2	DSS	10	8	0	2	89	38	+51	16	Promotion to the Honkbal Hoofdklasse
3	Silicon Storks	10	4	0	6	45	54	−9	8	Promotion to the Honkbal Hoofdklasse
4	Quick Amersfoort	10	4	0	6	57	78	−21	8	Promotion to the Honkbal Hoofdklasse
5	Pickles UVV	10	3	0	7	55	62	−7	4	Relegation to the Honkbal Overgangsklasse
6	Onze Gezellen	10	2	0	8	34	82	−48	4	Relegation to the Honkbal Overgangsklasse

Source: https://www.honkbalsite.com/
