= 2019 Honkbal Hoofdklasse season =

- League: Honkbal Hoofdklasse
- Sport: Baseball
- Duration: 4 April – 1 September

Regular season
- Season champions: Curaçao Neptunus
- Season MVP: Gilmer Lampe

League postseason

Holland Series
- Date: 22 August - 1 September
- Champions: L&D Amsterdam
- Runners-up: Curaçao Neptunus

Seasons
- ← 2018 2020 →

The 2019 Honkbal Hoofdklasse season began Thursday, April 4. Curaçao Neptunus was the regular season champion, but it lost in the Holland Series to L&D Amsterdam, four games to three.

== Standings ==
| Team | W | L | T | Pct. | GB |
|---|---|---|---|---|---|
| Curaçao Neptunus | 36 | 6 | 0 | .857 | — |
| L&D Amsterdam | 34 | 8 | 0 | .810 | 2 |
| HCAW | 22 | 18 | 2 | .550 | 13 |
| Hoofddorp Pioniers | 20 | 20 | 2 | .500 | 15 |
| Twins Oosterhout | 17 | 25 | 0 | .405 | 19 |
| Quick Amersfoort | 17 | 25 | 0 | .405 | 19 |
| DSS | 13 | 29 | 0 | .310 | 23 |
| Silicon Storks | 7 | 35 | 0 | .167 | 29 |

== Awards ==
On 23 October 2019, the KNBSB named Gilbert Lampe of L&D Amsterdam the most valuable player (MVP) and Lars Huijer of Hoofddorp Pioniers the best pitcher.
