= 2016 Honkbal Hoofdklasse season =

- League: Honkbal Hoofdklasse
- Sport: Baseball
- Duration: April 14 – August 7

Regular season
- Season champions: Curacao Neptunus
- Season MVP: Nick Urbanus

League postseason

Holland Series
- Champions: Curacao Neptunus
- Runners-up: L&D Amsterdam

Seasons
- ← 2015 2017 →

The 2016 Honkbal Hoofdklasse season began Thursday, April 14.

== Standings ==
Teams	W	L	T	Pct.	GB
Curacao Neptunus	34	7	1	.829	—
L&D Amsterdam Pirates	31	11	0	.738	3½
Vaessen Pioniers	27	15	0	.643	7½
HS Kinheim	24	17	1	.585	10
HCAW	19	23	0	.452	15½
De Glaskoning Twins	16	26	0	.405	18½
Pickles UVV	9	33	0	.214	25½
DSS	7	35	0	.167	27½
