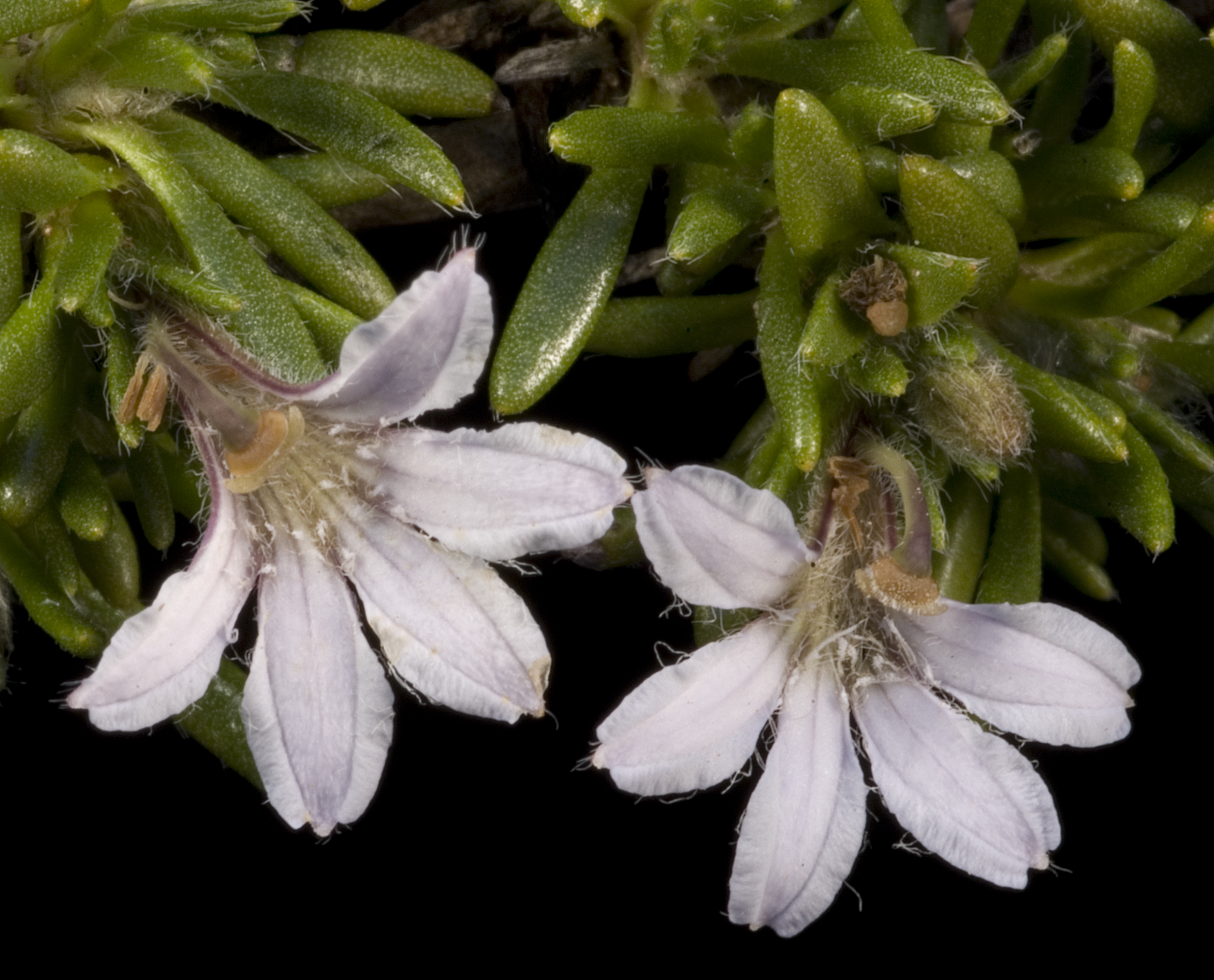

Scientific classification
- Kingdom: Plantae
- Clade: Embryophytes
- Clade: Tracheophytes
- Clade: Angiosperms
- Clade: Eudicots
- Clade: Asterids
- Order: Asterales
- Family: Goodeniaceae
- Genus: Scaevola
- Species: S. humifusa

Binomial name
- Scaevola humifusa de Vriese
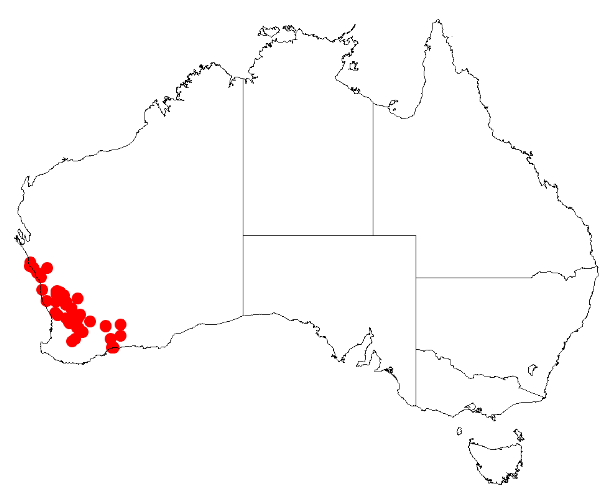
- Occurrence data from AVH

Synonyms
- List: Lobelia humifusa (de Vriese) Kuntze; Merkusia depressa (de Vriese) de Vriese; Merkusia humifusa (de Vriese) de Vriese; Merkusia molluginea de Vriese; Scaevola arenaria E.Pritz.; Scaevola depressa de Vriese; Scaevola humifusa de Vriese var. humifusa; Scaevola sp. Swallow Rock (K.R.Newbey 9677) WA Herbarium

= Scaevola humifusa =

Species of shrub

Scaevola humifusa, commonly known as procumbent scaevola, is a species of flowering plant in the family Goodeniaceae and is endemic to the south-west of Western Australia. It is a low-lying to prostrate shrub with sessile, narrowly lance-shaped leaves with the narrower end towards the base, white or cream-coloured flowers with greenish or brownish lines, and oval, ribbed fruit.

== Description ==
Scaevola humifusa is a low-lying or prostrate shrub covered with soft hairs and stems up to 400 mm (16 in) long. Its leaves are sessile, narrowly lance-shaped with the narrower end towards the base, 5–20 mm (0.20–0.79 in) long, 1–4 mm (0.039–0.157 in) wide and thick, with smooth edges. There are conspicuous, woolly hairs in the leaf axils. The flowers are borne in racemes up to 10 mm (0.39 in) long in leaf axils, with leafy bracts and lance-shaped bracteoles 4–6 mm (0.16–0.24 in), sometimes more or less obscured by the axillary hairs. The sepals are almost free and about 0.5 mm (0.020 in) long. The petals are white or cream-coloured with greenish or brownish lines, 7–11 mm (0.28–0.43 in) long, hairy on the outside, and densely hairy in the throat. Flowering occurs from August to November, and the fruit is oval, 2–4 mm (0.079–0.157 in) long, sometimes ribbed, almost glabrous with a single seed.

== Taxonomy ==
Scaevola humifusa was first formally described in 1845 by Willem Hendrik de Vriese in Lehmann's Plantae Preissianae from specimens collected near the Avon River 10 mi (16 km) from York by Ludwig Preiss in 1829. The specific epithet (humifusa) means 'procumbent'.

== Distribution and habitat ==
Procumbent scaevola grows sandy and clayey soils, on saline flats in the Avon Wheatbelt, Coolgardie, Esperance Plains, Geraldton Sandplains, Mallee and Swan Coastal Plain biogeographic regions of south-western Western Australia.

== Conservation status ==
Scaevola humifusa is listed as 'not threatened' by the Government of Western Australia Department of Parks and Wildlife.
