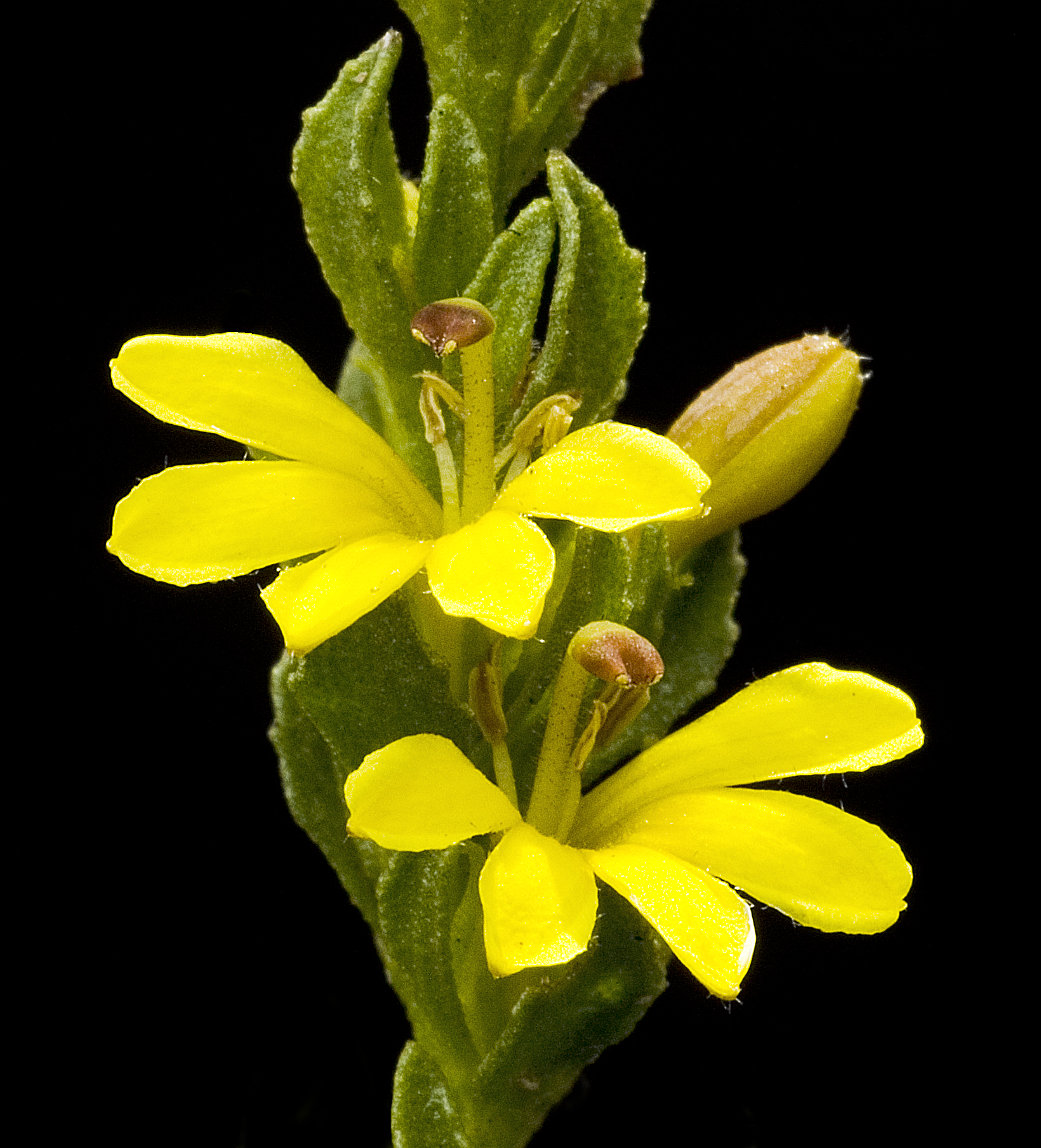

Scientific classification
- Kingdom: Plantae
- Clade: Tracheophytes
- Clade: Angiosperms
- Clade: Eudicots
- Clade: Asterids
- Order: Asterales
- Family: Goodeniaceae
- Genus: Goodenia
- Species: G. viscida

Binomial name
- Goodenia viscida R.Br.

Synonyms
- Goodenia spicata F.Muell.; Stekhovia viscida (R.Br.) de Vriese

= Goodenia viscida =

Viscid goodenia

Species of flowering plant

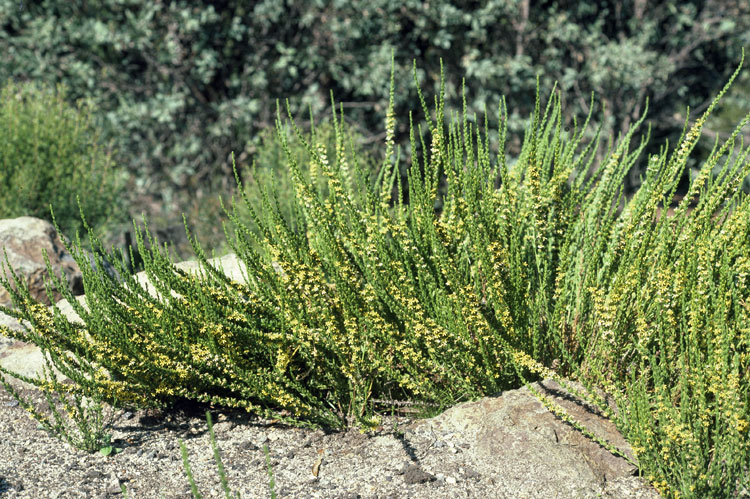
Habit in the ANBG

Goodenia viscida, commonly referred to as viscid goodenia, is a species of flowering plant in the family Goodeniaceae and is endemic to the south-west of Western Australia. It is an erect perennial herb or shrub with narrow oblong to egg-shaped leaves with toothed edges, and spikes of yellow flowers.

== Description ==
Goodenia viscida is an erect, perennial herb or shrub that typically grows to a height of 40 cm (16 in) and has sticky foliage. The leaves on the stems are oblong to egg-shaped with the narrower end towards the base, 5–20 mm (0.20–0.79 in) long and 2–5 mm (0.079–0.197 in) wide with toothed edges. The flowers are arranged in spikes up to 150 mm (5.9 in) long, with leaf-like bracts and narrow oblong bracteoles about 7 mm (0.28 in) long. The sepals are triangular, 6–7 mm (0.24–0.28 in) long and the petals are yellow, 6–7 mm (0.24–0.28 in) long. The lower lobes of the corolla are 3–4 mm (0.12–0.16 in) long with wings 0.3–0.4 mm (0.012–0.016 in) wide. Flowering mainly occurs from October to January and the fruit is a more or less spherical capsule about 3 mm (0.12 in) in diameter.

== Taxonomy and naming ==
Goodenia viscida was first formally described in 1810 by Robert Brown in his Prodromus Florae Novae Hollandiae et Insulae Van Diemen. The specific epithet (viscida) means "sticky", referring to the foliage.

== Distribution and habitat ==
Viscid goodenia grows in moist depressions and near lakes between Esperance and the Stirling Range in the Avon Wheatbelt, Coolgardie, Esperance Plains and Mallee biogeographic regions of south-western Western Australia.
