= 2018 Honkbal Hoofdklasse season =

- League: Honkbal Hoofdklasse
- Sport: Baseball
- Duration: April 26 – September 9

Regular season
- Season champions: Curacao Neptunus
- Season MVP: Dwayne Kemp

League postseason

Holland Series
- Champions: Curacao Neptunus
- Runners-up: L&D Amsterdam

Seasons
- ← 2017 2019 →

The 2018 Honkbal Hoofdklasse season began Thursday, April 26.

== Standings ==
Teams	W	L	T	Pct.	GB
Curacao Neptunus	37	5	0	.881	—
L&D Amsterdam	32	9	1	.762	4½
HCAW	21	18	3	.564	13½
Glaskoning Twins SC	18	21	3	.487	16½
DSS	17	20	5	.459	17½
Hoofddorp Pioniers	15	23	4	.368	21
Quick Amersfoort	14	25	3	.333	22½
Silicon Storks	4	37	1	.098	32½
