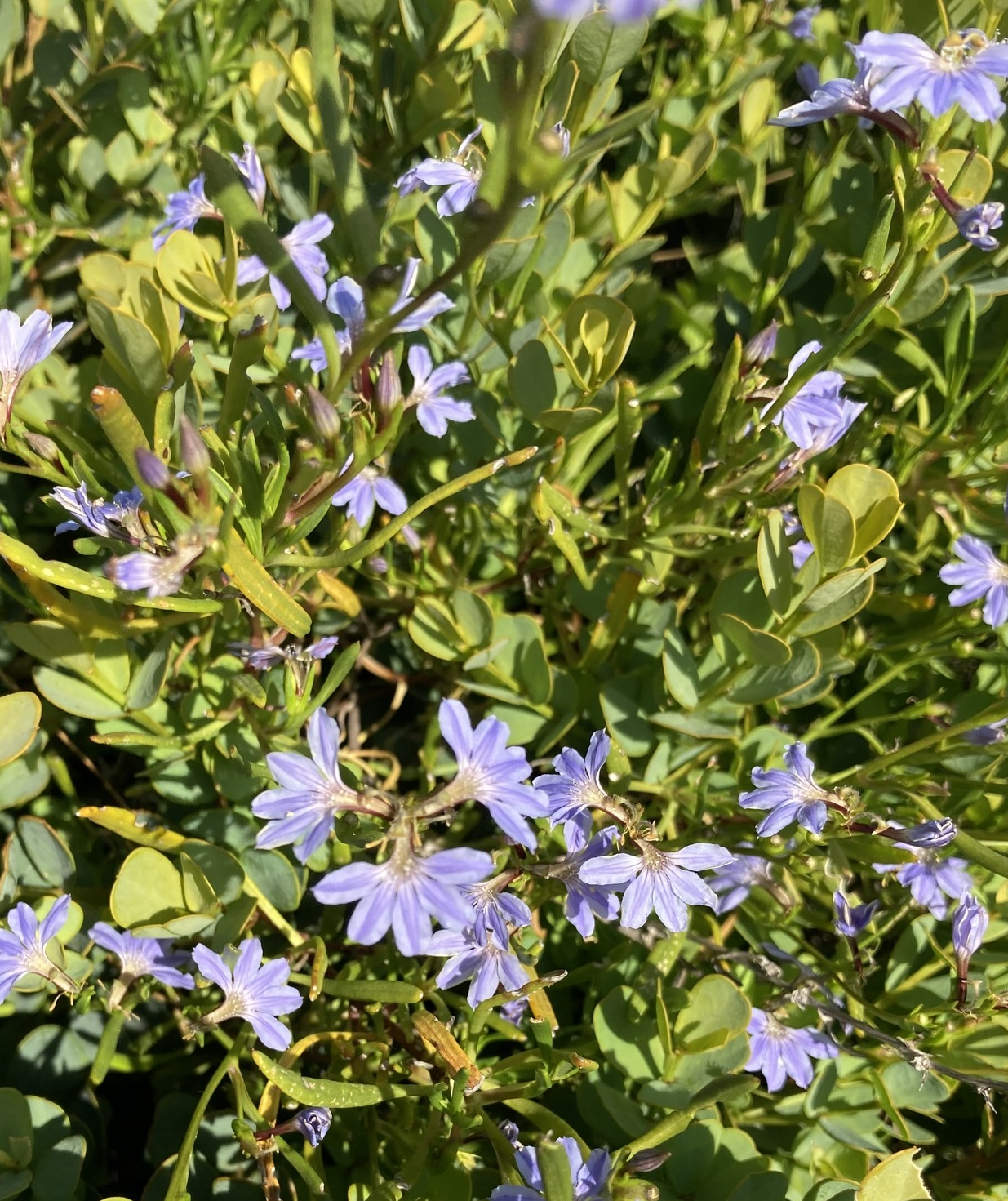

Scientific classification
- Kingdom: Plantae
- Clade: Embryophytes
- Clade: Tracheophytes
- Clade: Spermatophytes
- Clade: Angiosperms
- Clade: Eudicots
- Clade: Asterids
- Order: Asterales
- Family: Goodeniaceae
- Genus: Scaevola
- Species: S. globulifera

Binomial name
- Scaevola globulifera Labill.

Synonyms
- List: Lobelia globulifera (Labill.) Kuntze; Merkusia caespitosa (R.Br.) de Vriese; Merkusia globulifera (Labill.) de Vriese; Scaevola caespitosa R.Br.; Scaevola globulifera Labill. var. globulifera; Scaevola globulifera var. humilis Benth.; Scaevola globuliflora F.Muell. orth. var.; Scaevola revoluta var. strigosa de Vriese nom. superfl.; Scaevola revoluta auct. non R.Br.: Vriese, W.H. de in Lehmann, J.G.C. (ed.) (1845)

= Scaevola globulifera =

Species of flowering plant

Scaevola globulifera is a species of flowering plant in the family Goodeniaceae and is endemic to coastal areas of south-west of Western Australia. It is a spreading, low-lying to ascending shrub with sessile, linear to narrowly lance-shaped, sometimes toothed leaves, blue to white flowers and elliptic fruit.

== Description ==
Scaevola globulifera is a low-lying to ascending shrub, that typically grows to a height of up to 120 cm (47 in), and is usually glabrous, sometimes sticky when young. The leaves are sessile, sometimes toothed, linear to narrowly lance-shaped with the narrower end towards the base, 15–120 mm (0.59–4.72 in) long and 1–25 mm (0.039–0.984 in) wide. The flowers are borne in spikes up to 200 mm (7.9 in) long, with linear bracts 6–45 mm (0.24–1.77 in) long and narrowly lance-shaped bracteoles 3–7 mm (0.12–0.28 in) long. The sepals are egg-shaped, 1 mm (0.039 in) long and joined at the base and the petals are blue to white, 8–25 mm (0.31–0.98 in) long, more or less glabrous outside and bearded inside with wings about 1 mm (0.039 in) wide. Flowering mainly occurs from September to November, and the fruit is elliptic, up to 5 mm (0.20 in) in diameter.

== Taxonomy and naming ==
Scaevola globulifera was first formally described by Jacques Labillardière in 1805 in his Novae Hollandiae Plantarum Specimen. The specific epithet (globulifera) means 'bearing a little fruit'.

== Distribution and habitat ==
This species of Scaevola grows in coastal areas of the south-west Western Australia between Northampton and Israelite Bay in the Esperance Plains, Geraldton Sandplains, Jarrah Forest, Swan Coastal Plain and Warren bioregions, where it is found in sand on sandhills and limestone ridges.

== Conservation status ==
Scaevola globulifera is 'not threatened' by the Government of Western Australia Department of Parks and Wildlife.
