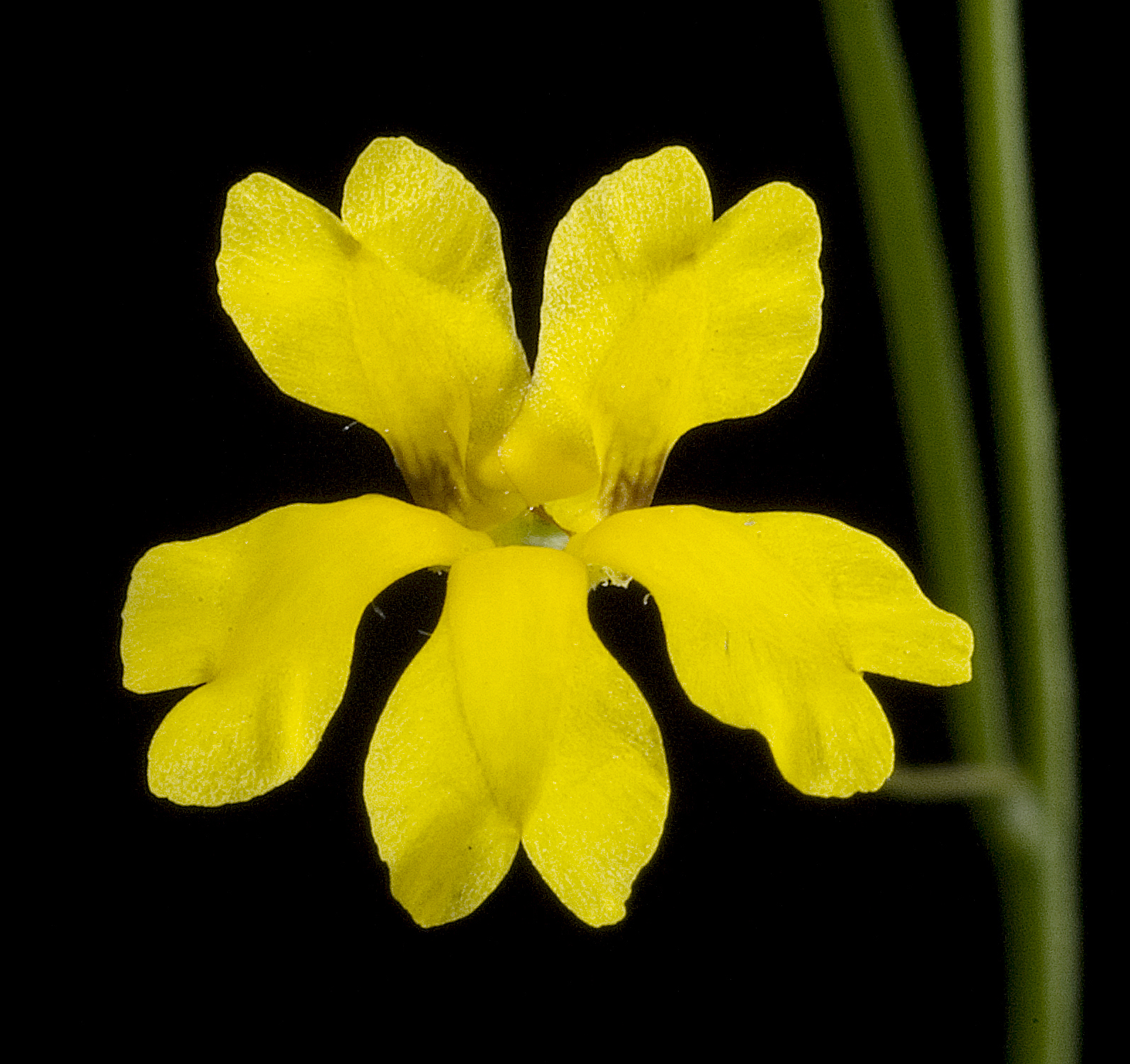

Scientific classification
- Kingdom: Plantae
- Clade: Embryophytes
- Clade: Tracheophytes
- Clade: Spermatophytes
- Clade: Angiosperms
- Clade: Eudicots
- Clade: Asterids
- Order: Asterales
- Family: Goodeniaceae
- Genus: Goodenia
- Species: G. pulchella

Binomial name
- Goodenia pulchella Benth.

Synonyms
- List: Aillya umbellata (de Vriese) de Vriese; Aillya umbellata var. denticulata (de Vriese) de Vriese; Aillya umbellata var. procumbens (de Vriese) de Vriese; Aillya umbellata var. spathulata (de Vriese) de Vriese; Aillya umbellata (de Vriese) de Vriese var. umbellata; Goodenia aillya F.Muell. nom. illeg.; Goodenia filiformis var. glaucoides E.Pritz.; Goodenia filiformis var. hirsuta K.Krause; Goodenia filiformis var. pulchella (Benth.) Benth.; Lobelia longiscapa de Vriese; Scaevola umbellata de Vriese; Scaevola umbellata var. denticulata de Vriese; Scaevola umbellata var. procumbens de Vriese; Scaevola umbellata var. spathulata de Vriese; Scaevola umbellata de Vriese var. umbellata; ? Velleia lanceolata Lindl.; ? Goodenia elongata auct. non Labill.: Vriese, W.H. de in Lehmann, J.G.C.

= Goodenia pulchella =

Species of plant

Goodenia pulchella is a species of flowering plant in the family Goodeniaceae and is endemic to the south-west of Western Australia. It is an erect to ascending herb with lance-shaped leaves mostly at the base of the plant, and racemes of yellow flowers.

== Description ==
Goodenia pulchella is an erect to ascending herb that typically grows to a height of 35 cm (14 in) and has foliage with stiff hairs. The leaves are lance-shaped, mostly arranged at the base of the plant, 40–80 mm (1.6–3.1 in) long and 1–11 mm (0.039–0.433 in) wide, sometimes with wavy or toothed edges. The flowers are arranged in racemes up to 150 mm (5.9 in) long with leaf-like bracts 1.5–2 mm (0.059–0.079 in) long, each flower on a pedicel 10–40 mm (0.39–1.57 in) long. The sepals are narrow oblong, 2–3 mm (0.079–0.118 in) long, the petals yellow, 8–14 mm (0.31–0.55 in) long. The lower lobes of the corolla are 2.5–4 mm (0.098–0.157 in) long with wings up to 1.5 mm (0.059 in) wide. Flowering occurs from September to January and the fruit is a more or less spherical capsule 2–3 mm (0.079–0.118 in) in diameter.

== Taxonomy and naming ==
Goodenia pulchella was first formally described in 1837 by George Bentham in Enumeratio plantarum quas in Novae Hollandiae ora austro-occidentali ad fluvium Cygnorum et in sinu Regis Georgii collegit Carolus Liber Baro de Hügel from specimens collected near the Swan River by Charles von Hügel. The specific epithet (pulchella) means "beautiful and small".

== Distribution and habitat ==
This goodenia grows in seasonally wet sites between Kalbarri and the Great Australian Bight in the south and south-west of Western Australia.

== Conservation status ==
Goodenia pulchella is classified as "not threatened" by the Government of Western Australia Department of Parks and Wildlife.
