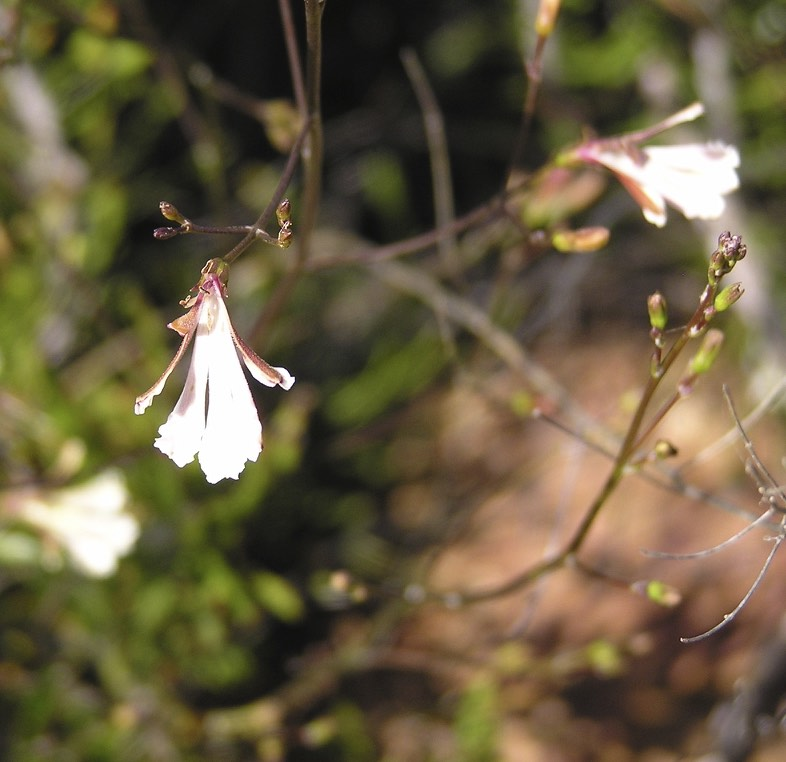
- Near Wongan Hills

Scientific classification
- Kingdom: Plantae
- Clade: Tracheophytes
- Clade: Angiosperms
- Clade: Eudicots
- Clade: Asterids
- Order: Asterales
- Family: Goodeniaceae
- Genus: Goodenia
- Species: G. pinifolia

Binomial name
- Goodenia pinifolia de Vriese

= Goodenia pinifolia =

Species of plant

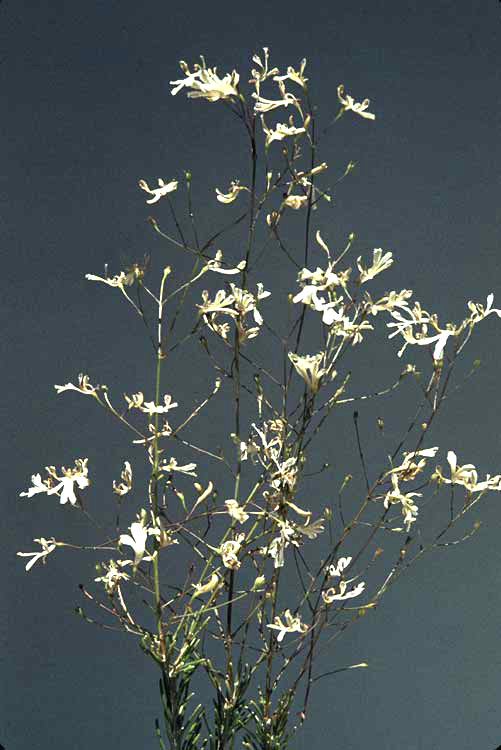
Habit near Wubin

Goodenia pinifolia, commonly known as pine-leaved goodenia, is a species of flowering plant in the family Goodeniaceae and is endemic to the southwest of Western Australia. It is an erect or spreading shrub with linear or tapering leaves on the stems, loose racemes of white or pale blue flowers, and more or less spherical fruit.

== Description ==
Goodenia pinifolia is an erect or spreading shrub that typically grows to a height of up to 0.3–1.5 m (1 ft 0 in – 4 ft 11 in). The leaves on the stems are linear to tapering, 20–60 mm (0.79–2.36 in) long and 1–3 mm (0.039–0.118 in) wide. The flowers are arranged in loose racemes up to 150 mm (5.9 in) long on a peduncle up to 60 mm (2.4 in) long with linear bracts up to 5 mm (0.20 in) long and linear bracteoles up to 2 mm (0.079 in) long. Each flower is on a pedicel up to 8 mm (0.31 in) long with linear sepals 2–6 mm (0.079–0.236 in) long and a white or pale blue corolla 9–15 mm (0.35–0.59 in) long. The lower lobes of the corolla are 6–7 mm (0.24–0.28 in) long with wings 0.5–1 mm (0.020–0.039 in) wide. Flowering mainly occurs from October to December and the fruit is a more or less spherical capsule 2–3 mm (0.079–0.118 in) in diameter.

== Taxonomy and naming ==
Goodenia pinifolia was first formally described in 1854 by Willem Hendrik de Vriese in the journal Natuurkundige Verhandelingen van de Hollandsche Maatschappij der Wetenschappen te Haarlem. The specific epithet (pinifolia) means "pine-leaved".

== Distribution and habitat ==
Pine-leaved goodenia grows on sandplains between Perenjori and Ravensthorpe in the south-west of Western Australia.

== Conservation status ==
This goodenia is classified as "not threatened" by the Department of Environment and Conservation (Western Australia).
