= Uezono =

Uezono is a surname. Notable people with the surname include:

- Rena Uezono (born 2010), Japanese figure skater
- Keiji Uezono (born 1984), Japanese baseball pitcher player
