= 2013 Honkbal Hoofdklasse season =

- League: Honkbal Hoofdklasse
- Sport: Baseball
- Duration: April 11 – August 18

Regular season
- Season champions: DOOR Neptunus
- Season MVP: Bas de Jong

League postseason

Holland Series
- Champions: DOOR Neptunus
- Runners-up: Vaessen Pioniers

Seasons
- ← 2012 2014 →

The 2013 Honkbal Hoofdklasse season began on Thursday, April 11. Mampaey The Hawks from Dordrecht competed in the Hoofdklasse for the first time. Sparta/Feyenoord was relegated at the end of the 2012 season but was declared bankrupt by a Rotterdam court on November 22, 2012 and did not compete in the Overgangsklasse.

== Standings ==
Teams	W	L	T	Pct.	GB
DOOR Neptunus	34	8	0	.810	—
Corendon Kinheim	31	11	0	.738	3
Vaessen Pioniers	29	12	1	.707	4½
L&D Amsterdam Pirates	28	13	1	.683	5½
UVV	17	25	0	.405	17
Mr. Cocker HCAW	14	27	1	.341	19½
Mampaey The Hawks	11	30	1	.268	22½
AdoLakers	2	40	0	.048	32
