= Baarschot, Oosterhout =

Baarschot Baorschot (Brabantian)
- Hamlet
- Location in the province of North Brabant in the Netherlands Location in the Netherlands
- Coordinates: 51°36′N 4°51′E
- Country: Netherlands
- Province: North Brabant
- Municipality: Oosterhout
- Village: Dorst
- Elevation: 5.7 m (19 ft)

Population (2020)
  - Total: c. 50
- Time zone: UTC+1 (CET)
  - Summer (DST): UTC+2 (CEST)
- Postcode: 4849
- Area code: 0161

Baarschot (Dutch pronunciation: [ˈbaːr.sxɔt]; Brabantian: Baorschot) is a hamlet in the municipality of Oosterhout in the province of North Brabant in the Netherlands. It is located in the south of the municipality between Breda and Dorst, the latter of which it is a part administratively. It has approximately 50 inhabitants.
