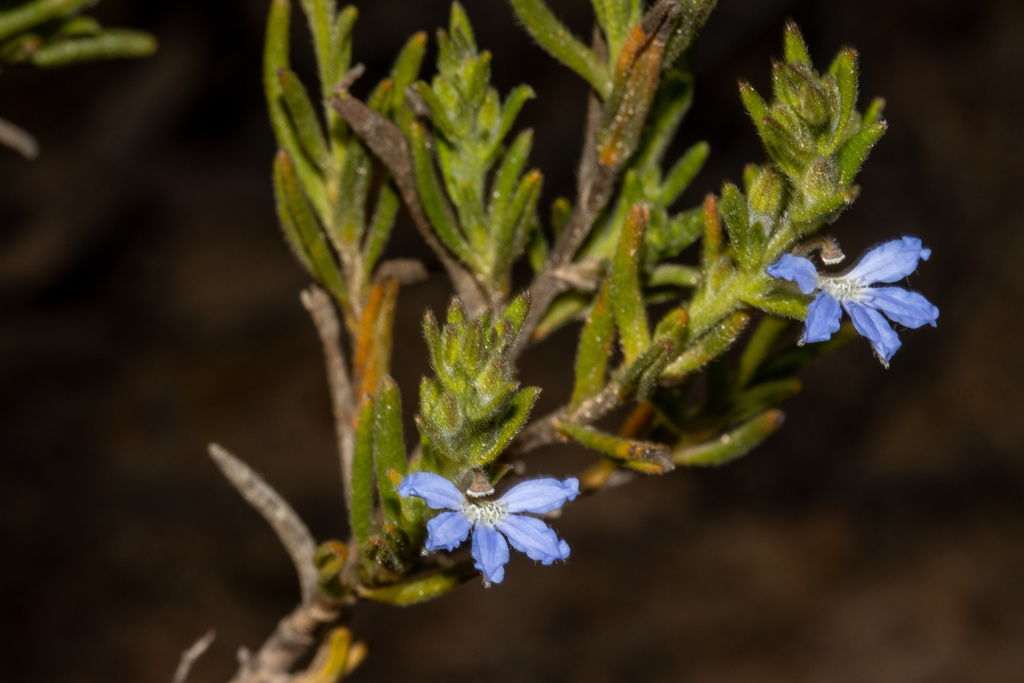

Scientific classification
- Kingdom: Plantae
- Clade: Embryophytes
- Clade: Tracheophytes
- Clade: Spermatophytes
- Clade: Angiosperms
- Clade: Eudicots
- Clade: Asterids
- Order: Asterales
- Family: Goodeniaceae
- Genus: Scaevola
- Species: S. linearis

Binomial name
- Scaevola linearis R.Br.
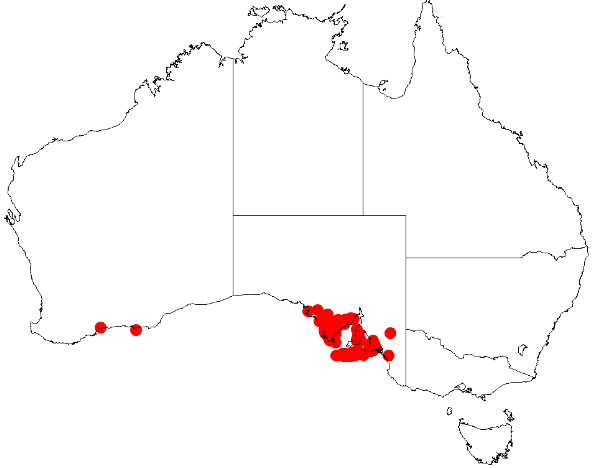
- Occurrence data from AVH

Synonyms
- Lobelia linearis (R.Br.) Kuntze nom. illeg.; Merkusia linearis (R.Br.) de Vriese

= Scaevola linearis =

Species of shrub

Scaevola linearis, commonly known as rough fanflower, is a species of flowering plant in the family Goodeniaceae and is endemic to South Australia. It is an erect to prostrate shrub with simple, and often glandular hairs, sessile, sometimes clustered, linear to narrowly elliptic leaves, blue flowers and elliptic to oval fruit.

== Description ==
Scaevola linearisis an erect to prostrate shrub that typically grows to a height of up to 60 cm (24 in) and has many woody stems with many branches covered with simple and glandular hairs. Its leaves are sometimes clustered, linear to narrowly elliptic, 2–85 mm (0.079–3.346 in) long and 1–7 mm (0.039–0.276 in) wide with the edges curved down or rolled under, sometimes with prominent silvery hairs in the leaf axils. The flowers are borne in leafy spikes up to 60 mm (2.4 in) long on the ends of branches or in leaf axils, with leafy bracts and elliptic bracteoles 4–9 mm (0.16–0.35 in) long and up to 1.5 mm (0.059 in) wide. The sepals are joined to form a tube with a wavy rim up to 1 mm (0.039 in) long, and the petals 12–20 mm (0.47–0.79 in) long and blue, hairy outside and bearded inside. The style is 6–9 mm (0.24–0.35 in) long and the ovary is elliptic and about 3 mm (0.12 in) long. The fruit is elliptic to oval, 4–6 mm (0.16–0.24 in) long with a single seed.

== Taxonomy ==
Scaevola linearis was first formally described in 1810 by Robert Brown in his Prodromus Florae Novae Hollandiae et Insulae Van Diemen. The specific epithet (linearis) means 'linear', usually referring to the leaves.

In 1990, Roger Carolin described two subspecies of S. linearis, and the names are accepted by the Australian Plant Census:

- Scaevola linearis subsp. confertifolia (J.M.Black) Carolin (previously known as Scaevola linearis var. confertifolia J.M.Black) has leaves 2–15 mm (0.079–0.591 in) long, 1–3 mm (0.039–0.118 in) wide and clustered on very short side branches, egg-shaped bracteoles, petals 7–10 mm (0.28–0.39 in) long and flowers mainly from August to January.
- Scaevola linearis R.Br. subsp. linearis has leaves 6–85 mm (0.24–3.35 in) long, 1–7 mm (0.039–0.276 in) wide and not clustered, elliptic bracteoles 4–9 mm (0.16–0.35 in) long petals 12–19 mm (0.47–0.75 in) long, and flowers mainly from August to December.

== Distribution ==
Subspecies confertifolia occurs on the Yorke Peninsula, on the Mount Lofty Ranges and on Kangaroo Island and subsp. linearis occurs on the Eyre Peninsula and in the Gawler Ranges of South Australia.
