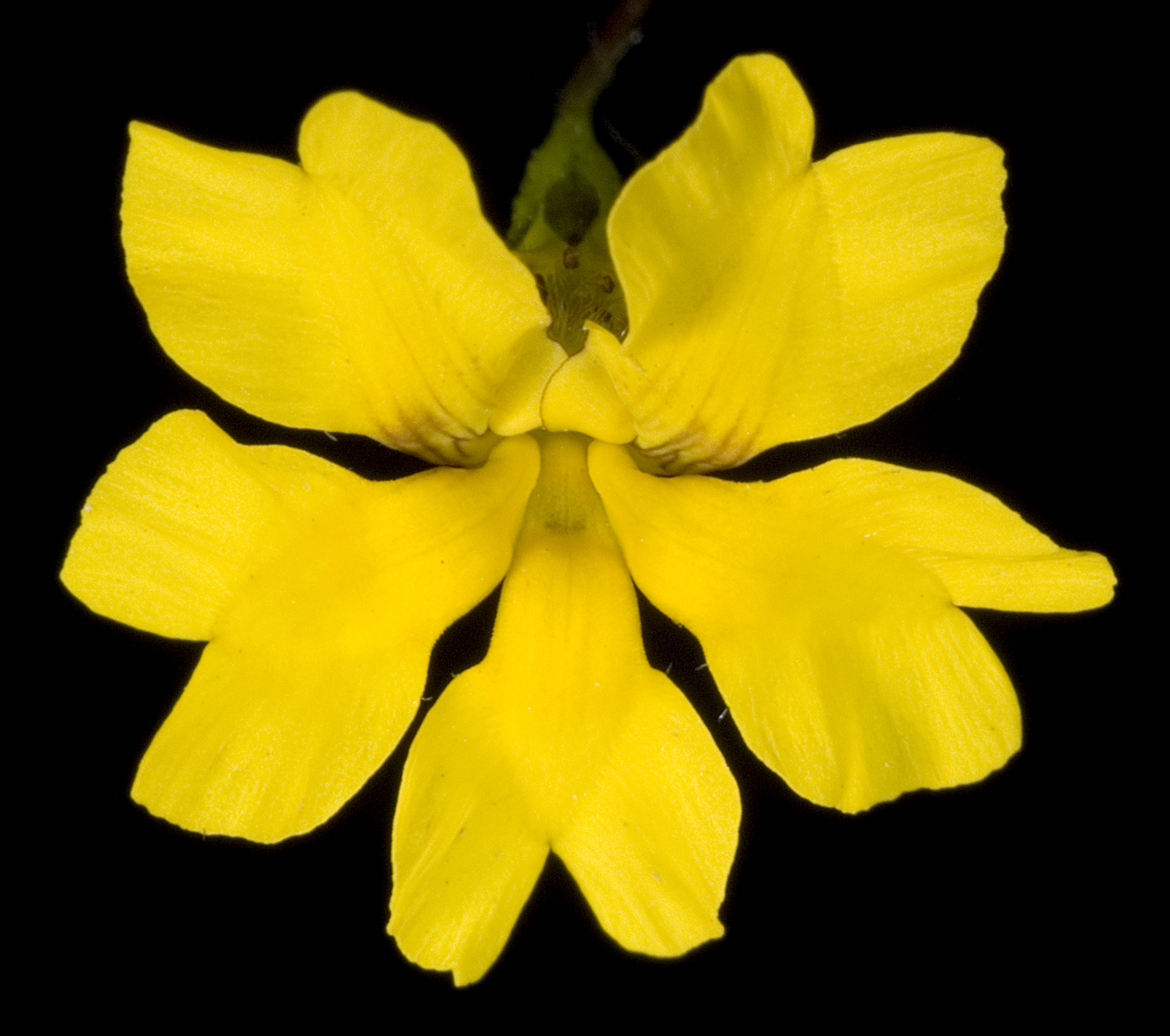

Scientific classification
- Kingdom: Plantae
- Clade: Embryophytes
- Clade: Tracheophytes
- Clade: Spermatophytes
- Clade: Angiosperms
- Clade: Eudicots
- Clade: Asterids
- Order: Asterales
- Family: Goodeniaceae
- Genus: Goodenia
- Species: G. pusilla

Binomial name
- Goodenia pusilla (de Vriese) de Vriese

Synonyms
- Goodenia tenella R.Br. nom. illeg.; Goodenia tenella var. major Benth.; Goodenia tenella Andrews var. tenella; Scaevola pusilla de Vriese

= Goodenia pusilla =

Species of plant

Goodenia pusilla is a species of flowering plant in the family Goodeniaceae and is endemic to the southwest of Western Australia. It is an ascending herb with lance-shaped to egg-shaped leaves at the base of the plant and single yellow flowers with brownish markings.

== Description ==
Goodenia pusilla is an ascending herb that typically grows to a height of up to 25 cm (9.8 in), sometimes forming stolons along the stems. The leaves at the base of the plant are lance-shaped to broadly egg-shaped with the narrower end towards the base, 20–50 mm (0.79–1.97 in) long and 4–14 mm (0.16–0.55 in) wide on a short petiole. The flowers are arranged singly in leaf axils on a pedicel about 2.5 mm (0.098 in) long. The sepals are lance-shaped, about 2 mm (0.079 in) long, the corolla yellow with brownish markings and 7–10 mm (0.28–0.39 in) long. The lower lobes of the corolla are about 3.5 mm (0.14 in) long with wings up to 2 mm (0.079 in) wide. Flowering mainly occurs from October to December and the fruit is an elliptical to oval capsule 3.5–4 mm (0.14–0.16 in) long.

== Taxonomy and naming ==
This species was first formally described in 1845 by Willem Hendrik de Vriese in Lehmann's Plantae Preissianae and was given the name Scaevola pusilla. In 1854, de Vriese changed the name to Goodenia pusilla. The specific epithet (pusilla) means "very small".

== Distribution and habitat ==
This goodenia grows in moist places in forest, woodland and swamp between Gingin and Albany in the south-west of Western Australia.

== Conservation status ==
Goodenia pusilla is classified as "not threatened" by the Department of Biodiversity, Conservation and Attractions.
