= 2015 Honkbal Hoofdklasse season =

- League: Honkbal Hoofdklasse
- Sport: Baseball
- Duration: April 16 – September 2015
- Number of teams: 8

Regular season
- Season champions: L&D Amsterdam

Playoffs

Holland Series
- Champions: Curaçao Neptunus
- Runners-up: Corendon Kinheim

Seasons
- ← 2014 2016 →

The 2015 Honkbal Hoofdklasse season started on Thursday, April 16 and will end with the Holland Series, taking place in September.

Eight teams will participate in the 2015 season. DSS was promoted from the Honkbal Overgangsklasse after defeating Mampaey The Hawks in the relegation series at the end of the 2014 season. Despite losing the relegation series, Mampaey The Hawks were reinstated into the league in February 2015 after AdoLakers withdrew and dissolved. DSS, UVV and Mampaey The Hawks are the only three current clubs to never have won a Holland Series.

| Team | City | Stadium | Ref |
|---|---|---|---|
| DSS | Haarlem | Pim Mulier Sportpark | |
| Corendon Kinheim | Haarlem | Pim Mulierstadion | |
| Curaçao Neptunus | Rotterdam | Neptunus Familiestadion | |
| L&D Amsterdam | Amsterdam | Sportpark Ookmeer | |
| Mampaey The Hawks | Dordrecht | Sportpark Krommedijk | |
| HCAW | Bussum | Sportvallei | |
| UVV | Utrecht | Sportpark De Paperclip | |
| Vaessen Pioniers | Hoofddorp | Sportpark Pioniers | |

== Regular season standings ==
| # | Teams | W | T | L | PTS | RS | RA |
|---|---|---|---|---|---|---|---|
| 1 | L&D Amsterdam | 34 | 0 | 8 | 68 | 273 | 97 |
| 2 | Curaçao Neptunus | 33 | 0 | 9 | 66 | 302 | 117 |
| 3 | Corendon Kinheim | 29 | 2 | 11 | 60 | 263 | 146 |
| 4 | Vaessen Pioniers | 25 | 0 | 17 | 50 | 206 | 194 |
| 5 | UVV | 16 | 0 | 26 | 32 | 161 | 192 |
| 6 | DSS | 12 | 0 | 30 | 24 | 117 | 204 |
| 7 | HCAW | 10 | 2 | 30 | 22 | 117 | 275 |
| 8 | Mampaey The Hawks | 7 | 0 | 35 | 14 | 122 | 336 |

== Record vs. opponents ==
2015 Honkbal Hoofdklasse Record vs. opponents
| Team | AMS | DSS | HAW | HCA | KIN | PIO | NPT | UVV |
|---|---|---|---|---|---|---|---|---|
| L&D Amsterdam | – | 3–0 | 3–0 | 3–0 | 2–1 | 1–2 | 0–0 | 2–1 |
| DSS | 0–3 | – | 3–0 | 0–0 | 0–3 | 0–3 | 1–2 | 1–2 |
| Mampaey The Hawks | 0–3 | 0–3 | – | 2–1 | 0–3 | 0–3 | 0–3 | 0–0 |
| HCAW | 0–3 | 0–0 | 1–2 | – | 0–2 | 0–3 | 1–2 | 1–2 |
| Corendon Kinheim | 1–2 | 3–0 | 3–0 | 2–0 | – | 0–0 | 1–2 | 2–1 |
| Vaessen Pioniers | 2–1 | 3–0 | 3–0 | 3–0 | 0–0 | – | 0–3 | 2–1 |
| Curaçao Neptunus | 0–0 | 2–1 | 3–0 | 2–1 | 2–1 | 3–0 | – | 3–0 |
| UVV | 1–2 | 2–1 | 0–0 | 2–1 | 1–2 | 1–2 | 0–3 | – |

Updated on: May 27, 2015

== Regular season schedule and results ==
=== April ===
| Date | Home | Result | Away |
|---|---|---|---|
| April 16, 2015 | DSS | 1 – 10 | Corendon Kinheim |
| | Curaçao Neptunus | 12 – 2 | HCAW |
| | L&D Amsterdam | 0 – 2 | UVV |
| | Vaessen Pioniers | 6 – 0 | Mampaey The Hawks |
| April 18, 2015 | DSS | 5 – 5 | Corendon Kinheim |
| | Curaçao Neptunus | 3 – 4 | HCAW |
| | L&D Amsterdam | 5 – 0 | UVV |
| | Vaessen Pioniers | 5 – 0 | Mampaey The Hawks |
| April 19, 2015 | Corendon Kinheim | 6 – 2 | DSS |
| | HCAW | 2 – 14 | Curaçao Neptunus |
| | UVV | 1 – 8 | L&D Amsterdam |
| | Mampaey The Hawks | 0 – 10 | Vaessen Pioniers |
| April 23, 2015 | Mampaey The Hawks | 5 – 17 | DSS |
| | HCAW | 1 – 7 | L&D Amsterdam |
| | UVV | 0 – 3 | Vaessen Pioniers |
| | Corendon Kinheim | 3 – 4 | Curaçao Neptunus |
| April 25, 2015 | Mampaey The Hawks | 1 – 2 | DSS |
| | HCAW | 0 – 10 | L&D Amsterdam |
| | UVV | 2 – 8 | Vaessen Pioniers |
| | Corendon Kinheim | 5 – 8 | Curaçao Neptunus |
| April 26, 2015 | DSS | 6 – 5 | Mampaey The Hawks |
| | L&D Amsterdam | 9 – 2 | HCAW |
| | Vaessen Pioniers | 3 – 8 | UVV |
| | Curaçao Neptunus | 4 – 5 | Corendon Kinheim |
| April 30, 2015 | HCAW | 2 – 11 | UVV |
| | DSS | 0 – 5 | Vaessen Pioniers |
| | Curaçao Neptunus | 5 – 1 | Mampaey The Hawks |
| | L&D Amsterdam | 2 – 0 | Corendon Kinheim |

=== May ===
| Date | Home | Result | Away |
|---|---|---|---|
| May 2, 2015 | HCAW | 3 – 1 | UVV |
| | DSS | 1 – 6 | Vaessen Pioniers |
| | Curaçao Neptunus | 10 – 0 | Mampaey The Hawks |
| | L&D Amsterdam | 3 – 1 | Corendon Kinheim |
| May 3, 2015 | UVV | 17 – 7 | HCAW |
| | Vaessen Pioniers | 7 – 0 | DSS |
| | Mampaey The Hawks | 2 – 5 | Curaçao Neptunus |
| | Corendon Kinheim | 7 – 3 | L&D Amsterdam |
| May 7, 2015 | Vaessen Pioniers | 3 – 8 | Curaçao Neptunus |
| | Corendon Kinheim | 5 – 5 | HCAW |
| | Mampaey The Hawks | 0 – 13 | L&D Amsterdam |
| | UVV | 4 – 2 | DSS |
| May 9, 2015 | Vaessen Pioniers | 2 – 15 | Curaçao Neptunus |
| | Corendon Kinheim | 9 – 2 | HCAW |
| | Mampaey The Hawks | 1 – 12 | L&D Amsterdam |
| | UVV | 1 – 2 | DSS |
| May 10, 2015 | Curaçao Neptunus | 5 – 2 | Vaessen Pioniers |
| | HCAW | 2 – 6 | Corendon Kinheim |
| | L&D Amsterdam | 13 – 3 | Mampaey The Hawks |
| | DSS | 1 – 8 | UVV |
| May 14, 2015 | L&D Amsterdam | 3 – 2 | Vaessen Pioniers |
| | HCAW | 2 – 3 | Mampaey The Hawks |
| | Corendon Kinheim | 1 – 4 | UVV |
| | Curaçao Neptunus | 6 – 3 | DSS |
| May 16, 2015 | L&D Amsterdam | 2 – 3 | Vaessen Pioniers |
| | HCAW | 0 – 1 | Mampaey The Hawks |
| | Corendon Kinheim | 6 – 4 | UVV |
| | Curaçao Neptunus | 4 – 1 | DSS |
| May 17, 2015 | Vaessen Pioniers | 7 – 5 | L&D Amsterdam |
| | Mampaey The Hawks | 9 – 13 | HCAW |
| | UVV | 1 – 5 | Corendon Kinheim |
| | DSS | 2 – 1 | Curaçao Neptunus |
| May 21, 2015 | DSS | 2 – 5 | L&D Amsterdam |
| | Vaessen Pioniers | 4 – 1 | HCAW |
| | Curaçao Neptunus | 11 – 2 | UVV |
| | Mampaey The Hawks | 3 – 8 | Corendon Kinheim |
| May 23, 2015 | DSS | 0 – 6 | L&D Amsterdam |
| | Vaessen Pioniers | 7 – 1 | HCAW |
| | Curaçao Neptunus | 10 – 0 | UVV |
| | Mampaey The Hawks | 0 – 9 | Corendon Kinheim |
| May 24, 2015 | L&D Amsterdam | 4 – 3 | DSS |
| | HCAW | 1 – 7 | Vaessen Pioniers |
| | UVV | 0 – 6 | Curaçao Neptunus |
| | Corendon Kinheim | 6 – 4 | Mampaey The Hawks |
| May 28, 2015 | L&D Amsterdam | | Curaçao Neptunus |
| | HCAW | | DSS |
| | Corendon Kinheim | | Vaessen Pioniers |
| | UVV | | Mampaey The Hawks |
| May 29, 2015 | L&D Amsterdam | | Curaçao Neptunus |
| May 30, 2015 | HCAW | | DSS |
| | Corendon Kinheim | | Vaessen Pioniers |
| | UVV | | Mampaey The Hawks |
| | Curaçao Neptunus | | L&D Amsterdam |
| May 31, 2015 | DSS | | HCAW |
| | Vaessen Pioniers | | Corendon Kinheim |
| | Mampaey The Hawks | | UVV |
