= 2014 Honkbal Hoofdklasse season =

- League: Honkbal Hoofdklasse
- Sport: Baseball
- Duration: April 17 – August 12

Regular season
- Season champions: DOOR Neptunus
- Season MVP: Bas de Jong

League postseason

Holland Series
- Champions: DOOR Neptunus
- Runners-up: L&D Amsterdam

Seasons
- ← 2013 2015 →

The 2014 Honkbal Hoofdklasse season began Thursday, April 17.

== Standings ==
Teams	W	L	T	Pct.	GB
DOOR Neptunus	34	7	1	.829	—
L&D Amsterdam	32	10	0	.762	2½
Corendon Kinheim	29	13	0	.690	5½
Vaessen Pioniers	27	14	1	.659	7
UVV	14	25	3	.359	19
Mr. Cocker HCAW	12	28	2	.300	21½
AdoLakers	9	32	1	.220	25
Mampaey The Hawks	6	34	2	.150	27½
