= Robb Paller =

American-Israeli baseball player (born 1993)

Twins Oosterhout – No. 6
- Outfielder
- Born: May 21, 1993 (age 33); Brooklyn, New York, U.S.
- Bats: Left Throws: Right
Medals
Men's baseball
Representing Israel
European Baseball Championship
Silver medal – second place	2021 Israel	Team

Robert Paller (Hebrew: רוב פולר; born May 21, 1993) is an American-Israeli professional baseball outfielder for the Twins Oosterhout of the Honkbal Hoofdklasse. He has played for the Israel national baseball team in the 2020 Summer Olympics and other international tournaments.

Paller played college baseball for the Columbia Lions baseball team, and was first team All-Ivy League in his senior year. He has also played professionally in the independent Frontier League, United Shore Professional Baseball League, Canadian-American Association, United Shore Professional Baseball League, Pecos League, Pioneer League

== Early life ==
Paller is from Brooklyn, New York. He attended the Berkeley Carroll School, graduating in 2011, where he was coached by his father Walter Paller. Playing center field and hitting leadoff, he batted .426 as a junior with 18 stolen bases in 19 attempts, and .531 as a senior with 52 runs, 20 runs batted in (RBI), and 32 stolen bases, and was named league MVP. He was named All-Brooklyn by the New York Post in his junior and senior seasons, and All-City by the New York Post and the New York Daily News as a senior.

== College baseball ==
Paller attended Columbia University, where he played college baseball for the Columbia Lions, primarily playing left field. In his sophomore year in 2014, he had a .296/.351/.419 slash line with 12 doubles (third in the Ivy League), 16 walks (9th), and 35 RBI (leading the league) in 186 at bats, and was named All-Ivy League second team, and Academic All-Ivy League. That summer, he played for the Thunder Bay Border Cats, a collegiate summer baseball league team. He batted .274/.391/.478 in 226 at bats with 17 doubles, nine home runs (both tied for fourth in the Northwoods League), 47 RBI, and 43 walks.

In his junior year in 2015, Paller batted .264/.392/.472 with 7 home runs, 35 RBI (both fourth in the Ivy), and 32 walks (leading the league) in 159 at bats. That summer, Paller played for the Green Bay Bullfrogs in the Northwoods League. He batted .345(7th in the league)/.433(8th)/.480 in 177 at bats. He also played in seven games for the Bourne Braves of the Cape Cod Baseball League, batting .095.

In 2016 he batted .302/.400/.503 (sixth in the league) with 26 runs (seventh), 13 doubles (third), 5 home runs (fourth), 32 RBI (second) and 24 walks (fifth) in 149 at bats, and was named first team All-Ivy League. Paller finished his Columbia tenure fourth in school history in doubles (43), fifth in walks (79), and 6th in RBI (111).

== Professional baseball ==
=== Lake Erie Crushers ===
In 2016, Paller played for the Lake Erie Crushers of the Frontier League and the Sussex County Miners of the Canadian-American Association. Paller batted a combined .215/.365/.341 in 135 at-bats.

=== Birmingham-Bloomfield Beavers ===
In 2017, Paller played for the Birmingham-Bloomfield Beavers of the United Shore Professional Baseball League. He batted .367/.557/.633 (leading the league in each category), with six home runs (7th) and 37 walks (leading the league) in 90 at-bats, and had 21 at bats for Lake Erie. In 2018 he played for Birmingham-Bloomfield, and batted .228/.354/.444 in 177 at-bats.

=== Colorado Springs Snow Sox ===
In 2021, Paller played for the Colorado Springs Snow Sox of the Pecos League. He batted .421/.574/.614 in 88 at-bats, playing primarily left field. In 2022, he again played for the Snow Sox, batting .271/.400/.271 in 59 at-bats, playing primarily right field.

=== Idaho Falls Chukars ===
On February 25, 2023, Paller signed with the Idaho Falls Chukars of the Pioneer League. On June 7, the team reinstated him to their active roster. He batted .293/.436/.495 in 99 at-bats. On August 2, Paller was released by the Chukars.

=== New Jersey Jackals ===
On June 20, 2024, Paller signed with the New Jersey Jackals of the Frontier League. In 43 appearances for the Jackals, Paller batted .201/.350/.313 with four one runs and 18 RBI.

On January 31, 2025, Paller signed with the Lexington Legends of the Atlantic League. Lexington released him on April 19, before he played in a game.

=== Twins Oosterhout ===
On April 5, 2026, Paller signed with the Twins Oosterhout of the Honkbal Hoofdklasse. He played in seven games in 2025, batting .409 with three home runs. Paller returned to Oosterhout in 2026 and was named the hottest player of the week for the Hoofdklasse's 12th week.

== International career ==
In 2019, Paller became an Israeli citizen so that he could compete for the Israel national team in the 2020 Summer Olympics.

Paller played for Israel in the outfield as the team played in the 2019 European Baseball Championship - B-Pool in early July 2019 in Blagoevgrad, Bulgaria, winning all of its games and advancing to the playoffs against Team Lithuania in the 2019 Playoff Series at the end of July 2019 for the last qualifying spot for the 2019 European Baseball Championship. He batted .273/.500(7th in the tournament)/.500 with two doubles (4th), one home run, and 10 walks (1st) in 22 at bats. He then played for Team Israel at the 2019 European Baseball Championship, batting .222/.417/.593 with one double, three home runs, and nine walks in 27 at bats.

He played left field and center field for Israel at the 2020 Summer Olympics in Tokyo in the summer of 2021.

In the 2021 European championship, Paller batted .150 with one double in six games. He played left field and batted .143/.417/.357 with 8 walks (tied for third in the championship) in 14 at bats for Israel in the 2023 European championship in September 2023 in the Czech Republic. In the 2025 European championship, Paller batted .300 with one home run in seven games.
