= Heikant, Oosterhout =

Hamlet in Oosterhout, the Netherlands

Coordinates: 51°38′12″N 4°53′10″E

Heikant is a hamlet in the municipality of Oosterhout, in the Dutch province of North Brabant. It is located about 3 km southeast of the centre of Oosterhout.
