= Wanny van Gils =

Dutch footballer and coach

Personal information
- Full name: Wanny van Gils
- Date of birth: 10 February 1959
- Place of birth: Oosterhout, Netherlands
- Date of death: 28 July 2018 (aged 59)
- Position: Forward

Senior career*
Years	Team	Apps	(Gls)
1978–1981	NAC	60	(14)
1981–1983	Beringen	47	(15)
1983–1988	Willem II	133	(34)
1988–1991	NAC	96	(19)
Total		336	(82)
- * Club domestic league appearances and goals

Wanny van Gils (February 10, 1959 – July 28, 2018) was a Dutch football player and coach.

== Club career ==
He was under contract with NAC, Beringen and Willem II. With Willem II he was relegated to the Eerste Divisie but won promotion back to the Eredivisie at the first attempt.

His wonderful solo-goal against Eindhoven in 1991 was long time dubbed as "the lost goal" since there seemed to be no footage of it.

== Personal life ==
After football, he became an insurance consultant and began his own business in financial services. He was also chairman of VV TSC, a Dutch football club and head coach at TSC, VV Oosterhout en DIA.
