= Kokolishi =

Dutch softball team

Kokolishi is a softball team based in The Hague, The Netherlands.

Kokolishi's team plays in the Softbal Heren Hoofdklasse, the top level of softball in the Netherlands. In 2006 Kokolishi reached the 2006 Holland Series by beating Centrals in the play-offs.

After losing the first match in the Holland Series Kokolishi took a 3-0 lead in the first inning of the second match. Jeanric Ursula hit a home run, Storks pitcher Ed Hoet then hit next batter Irvin Redan, resulting in commotion from the bench. A few minutes later Storks filed a protest stating it felt threatened before leaving the pitch. The match was halted and the status had to be determined. The Dutch softball association did not share Storks' opinion and awarded the match to Kokoloshi. Storks eventually won the third and fourth match to claim their third consecutive title.
