= De anoniemen =

Sculpture by Paul Elshout in Oosterhout, Netherlands

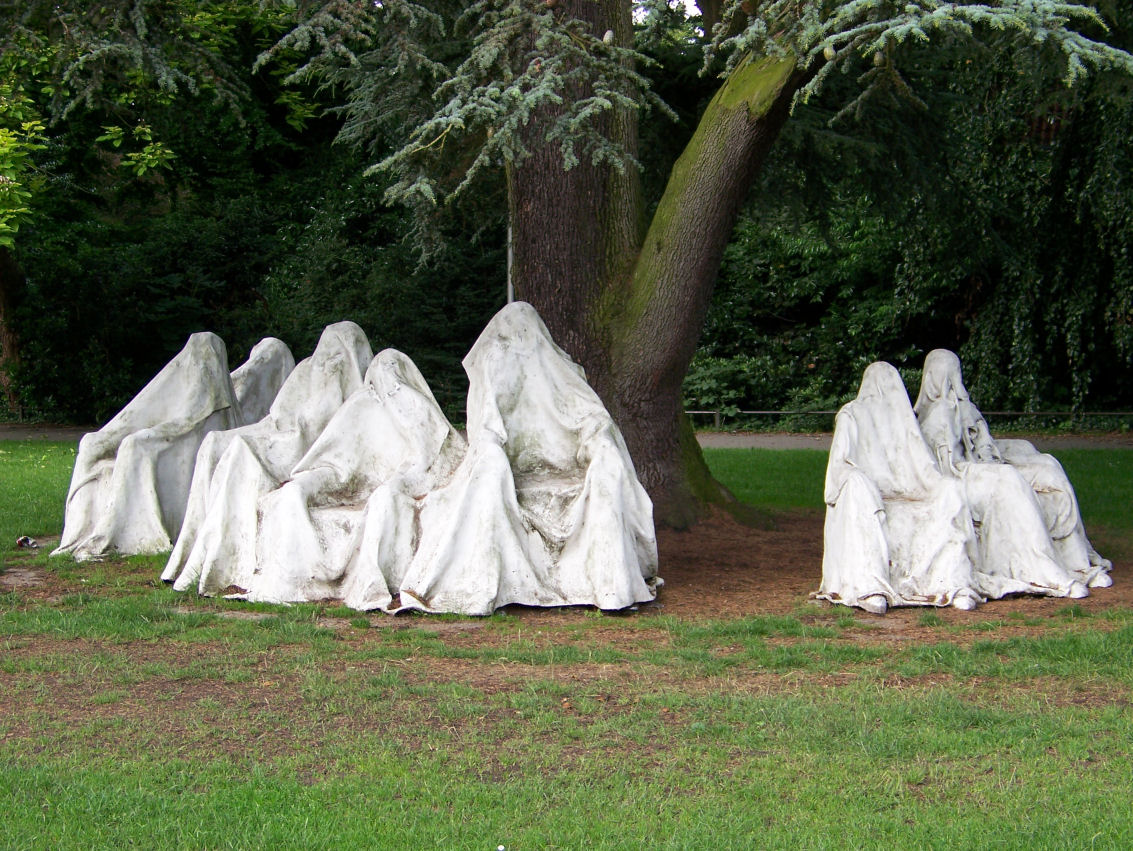
De Anoniemen

De Anoniemen is a group of statues in Oosterhout in the municipality of Oosterhout, North Brabant. The statues are located in the Slotpark, and were made by Paul Elshout, a Dutch artist. The polyester work of art depicts nine ghostly humanoid figures in white sheets, sitting around a cedar tree.

== History ==
In 1980, the statues were bought by the municipality of Ooshterhout for 45,000 guilders.

On December 3, 2016, the group of statues was set on fire. On December 7, 2016, the statue was set on fire for a second time. The statues were restored with help of the original artist.
