= 2006 Holland Series (men's softball) =

Dutch softball championship series

The 2006 Holland Series in men's softball, were held from September 16 to September 24, 2006, between the two Dutch play-off winners Kokolishi and Screenhouse Storks. The first team to win 3 games in the best-of-five-games series, became be Duch champions. Storks proved to be the better team by winning three out of four matches, resulting in a 3–1 series and winning their third consecutive title.

== Results ==
Game	Score	Date
1	Screenhouse Storks 6, @ Kokolishi 2	September 16
2	Screenhouse Storks 0, @ Kokolishi 3	September 16
3	Kokolishi 4, @ Screenhouse Storks 7	September 23
4	Kokolishi 1, @ Screenhouse Storks 11	September 23

== Matchday 1: Kokolishi - Screenhouse Storks 2-6, 3-0 ==
Defending champions Storks won the Holland Series opener beating Kokolishi 6–2. In the second match held on the same day Kokolishi took a 3–0 lead. This already happened in the very first inning, with Jeanric Ursula hitting a home run. Pitcher Ed Hoet then hit next batter Irvin Redan, resulting in commotion from the bench. A few minutes later Storks filed a protest stating it felt threatened before leaving the pitch.

The match was halted and the status had to be determined. The Dutch softball association did not share Storks' opinion and awarded the match to Kokoloshi.

== Matchday 2: Screenhouse Storks - Kokolishi 7-4, 11-1 ==
With Storks playing at home in the third and fourth match it became clear who were going to be Dutch Champions. In the opener of the day pitcher Ed Hoet struck out ten batters. Still Storks were 3-1 behind in the fourth inning, when Tim Verbrugge tripled and later scored later when Bob Bik singled. Bik also scored himself and both teams managed to score a run in the fifth. In the sixth inning Storks completed their comeback by scoring three more runs and winning the match 7–4.

Ed Hoet also pitched in the second match of the day giving away only two base hits. Storks themselves created eleven base hits. Storks took an early lead and scored four runs in the very first inning. They added another three runs in the second inning, securing their third consecutive title. The match eventually ended in an 11–1 win by Storks, taking only 4½ inning.

Preceded by 2005 Holland Series	Holland Series	Succeeded by 2007 Holland Series
