= VOKO =

Dutch volleyball club

- Founded: 6 June 1974
- Ground: VOKO-Home, Oosterhout, Netherlands
- League: Dutch Promotion Division (first teams)
- Website: Club home page

VOKO is a volleyball club from Oosterhout.

VOKO was founded in 1974 as an agreement between former Oosterhout volleyball clubs LEC and RELAX. Between 2009 and 2011 the club was sponsored by Greek restaurant Irodion and the teams played under the name VOKO/Irodion. The first teams, both men and women, play in the Dutch promotion division.
