= Keiji Uezono =

Japanese baseball player (born 1984)

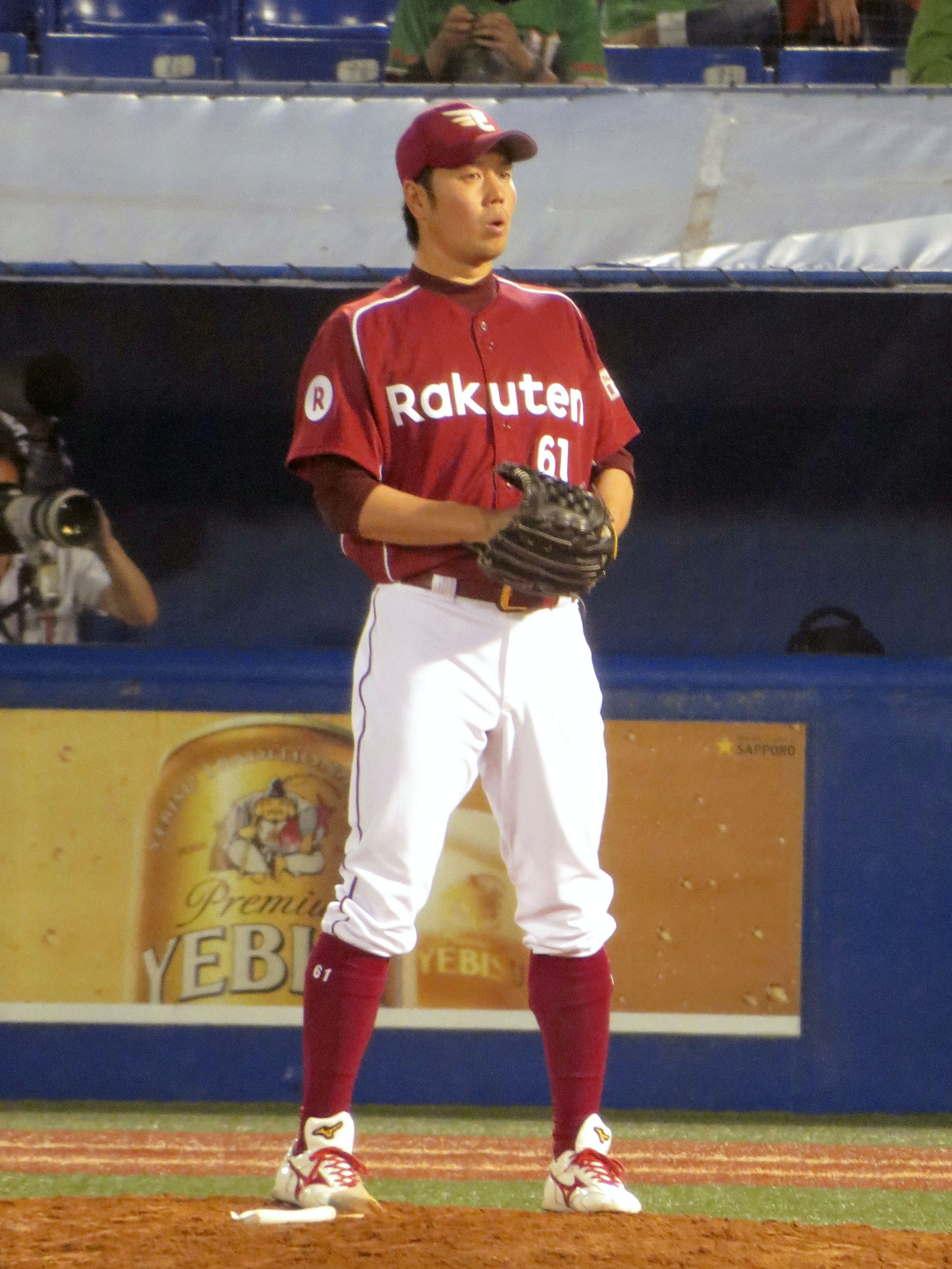
- Uezono with the Tohoku Rakuten Golden Eagles
- Pitcher
- Born: June 30, 1984 (age 42); Fukuoka, Fukuoka, Japan
- Batted: Right Threw: Right

NPB debut
- June 8, 2007, for the Hanshin Tigers

Last NPB appearance
- August 16, 2014, for the Tohoku Rakuten Golden Eagles

NPB statistics
- Win–loss record: 15–14
- Earned run average: 3.88
- Strikeouts: 189
- Stats at Baseball Reference

Teams
- Hanshin Tigers (2007–2011); Tohoku Rakuten Golden Eagles (2012–2015)

Career highlights and awards
- Central League Rookie of the Year (2007)

Keiji Uezono (上園 啓史, Uezono Keiji; born June 30, 1984) is a Japanese former professional baseball pitcher. He played in Nippon Professional Baseball (NPB) for the Hanshin Tigers and Tohoku Rakuten Golden Eagles from 2007 to 2015.

== Career ==
Uezono played for the Twins Oosterhout of the Dutch Honkbal Hoofdklasse in 2016. He made nine appearances (seven starts) for the team, compiling a 4–1 record and 1.68 ERA with 45 strikeouts over 59 innings pitched.
