= Mampaey The Hawks =

Dutch baseball club

The Hawks

Information
- League: Honkbal Hoofdklasse
- Location: Dordrecht
- Ballpark: Sportpark Krommedijk, 2,000 capacity

The Hawks is a Dutch baseball club based in Dordrecht. They play their home games at Sportpark Krommedijk. The club currently has roughly 170 members.

The club was founded in 1959 by Daam Hogendijk, a physical education teacher. The team moved to its current facility on the Krommedijk in 1977. The Hawks participated in the Honkbal Hoofdklasse, the top baseball league of the Netherlands, from 2013 to 2015.
