= Dorst =

- Village
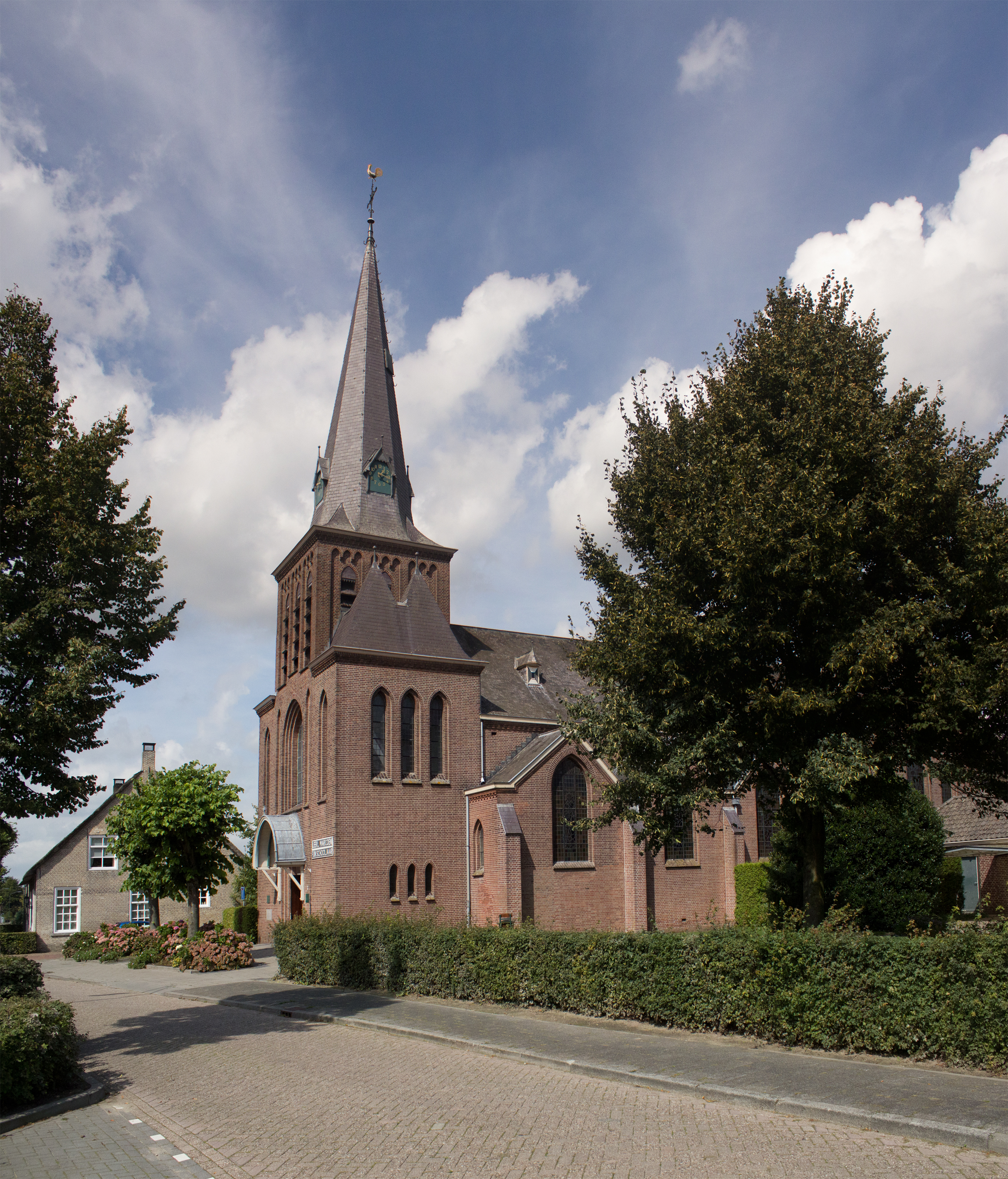
- St Marculphus Church

- Location in the province of North Brabant in the Netherlands Dorst (Netherlands)
- Coordinates: 51.5906°N 4.8578°E
- Country: Netherlands
- Province: North Brabant
- Municipality: Oosterhout

Area
  - Total: 17.68 km^{2} (6.83 sq mi)
- Elevation: 8 m (26 ft)

Population (2021)
  - Total: 3,310
  - Density: 187/km^{2} (485/sq mi)
- Time zone: UTC+1 (CET)
  - Summer (DST): UTC+2 (CEST)
- Postal code: 4849
- Dialing code: 0161

Dorst is a village in the municipality Oosterhout, in the Dutch province North Brabant. Dorst is located near Rijen and the nearest cities are Breda, Oosterhout and Tilburg.

== Toponymy ==
The name Dorst is supposed to have originated from Dornt, which would refer to meidoorn, that was used as plot separation.

Another explanation is a contraction of the words "De Horst".

== History ==
Dorst was first mentioned in 1290, then in 1323 and thereafter more regularly. Willem van Duivenvoorde was the lord of Kasteel Strijen in 1325 and thus also of Dorst.

In 1511 the chapel of Dorst was first mentioned. The chapel was devoted to the Holy Trinity. In 1648 the chapel had to be closed and it fell into disrepair. In 1675 the Catholics could use a barn church instead. In 1689 there was a Saint Marcouf relic donated, which made Dorst into a sanctuary. In 1835, a church was built across from the chapel. The chapel was demolished after that. In 1912 the church was also demolished and the current Sint-Marculphuskerk was built.

Dorst was poor: north of the town there was barren soil and south of the town there was a swampy area called 'het Goor'. To provide for the life maintenance the people devoted to goat breeding. Goats also produced milk, that milk was of great importance for the health of the people in the town.

In 1888 the Seterse Heide was designated as a catchment area and in 1894 the waterworks was built. The railway alongside Dorst was opened in 1867, but Dorst did not get a station. However, from 1908 to 1930 there was a stopping place for the trains. North of the railway, at De Vliert 20, there was a brickyard. This was established at 1899 by Frans Oomen. The factory possessed a Hoffmann kiln and produced 5 to 6 million stones a year. For some time there also functioned a roof tiles factory. The stone factory was demolished in 2010 after a time of vacancy.

In 1931 the Franciscans of Etten settled in Dorst. They provided the nursery school and the education for girls.

Already before World War II the tourism grew. Especially the in Boswachterij Dorst located Natuurbad Surae attracted people. There were also simple group accommodations created, named camping houses. Those houses have become out of use.

== Sightseeings ==
- The neogothic Sint-Marculphuskerk from 1912 designed by Joseph Cuypers.
- Several farms, like the long farmhouse at Baarschotseweg 77 from 1867, which core supposedly originates from the 18th century.
- Statue of a goatbreeder, from 1999 made by Pierre van Leest from Lage Zwaluwe, at de Spoorstraat.
- The Vredeskapel, from 1955. It is a square building with a tented roof, designed by Jac Kreijtkamp. It is devoted to Virgin Mary. The chapel became in disrepair, but was restored in 1978. After that a plaque was placed to remember the Polish Soldiers that died by the liberation of Dorst on 29 October 1944.

== Nature and landscape ==
North of Dorst there is the vast Boswachterij Dorst, a forest and nature area on the former Seterse Heide. South of Dorst there is a large-scale open agriculture area.

== Services ==
There is education on the elementary school Marcoen. Dorst is accessible via N282 and the A27. Bus transportation is done by Veolia Transport Nederland:

- Line 131 : Breda – Dorst – Rijen – Gilze – Tilburg
- Line 197 : Oosterhout – Dorst – Molenschot – Rijen

== Near cities ==
Teteringen, Breda, Oosterhout, Rijen, Molenschot, and Bavel.

== Gallery ==
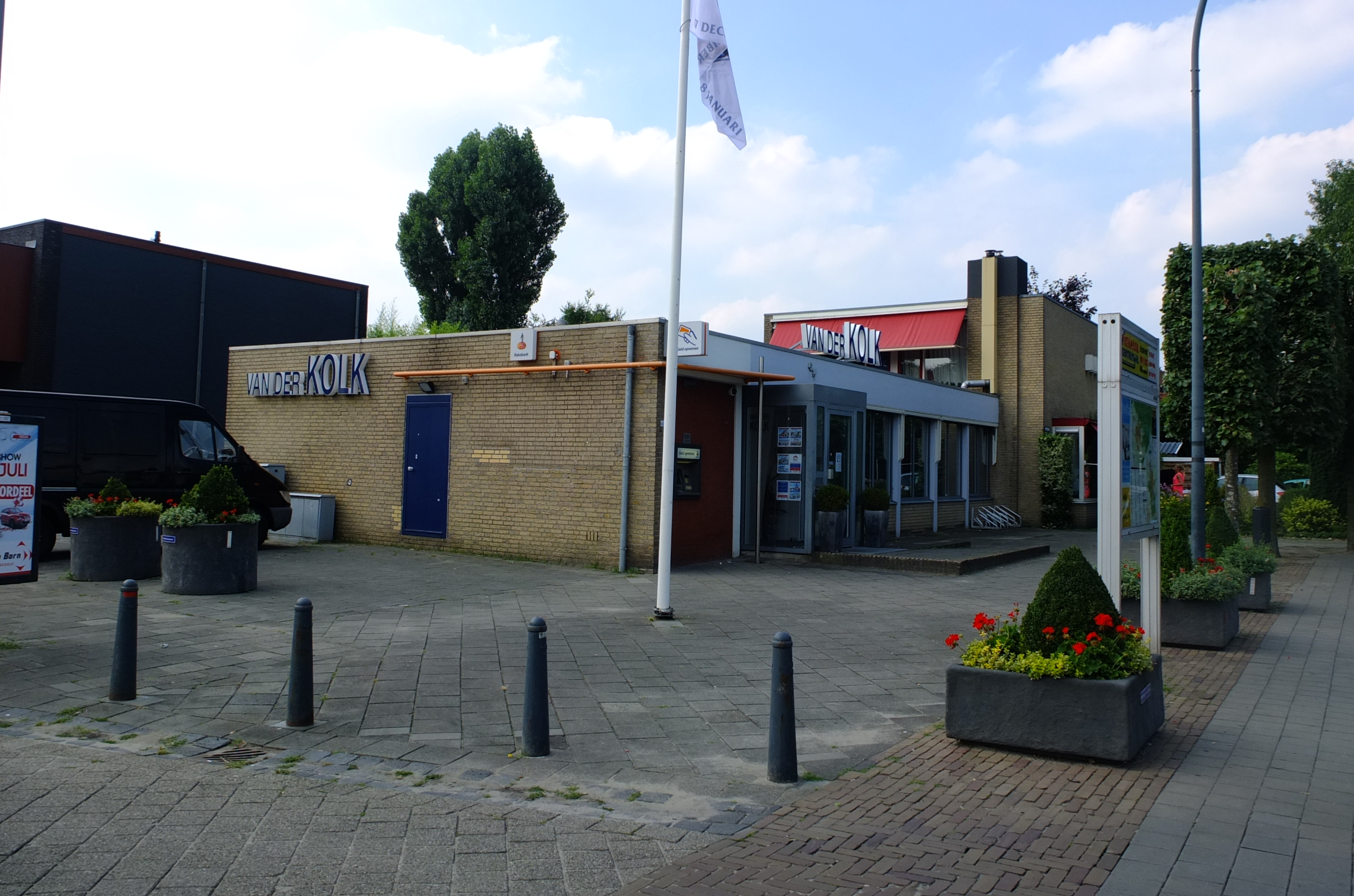
Real estate agent in Dorst

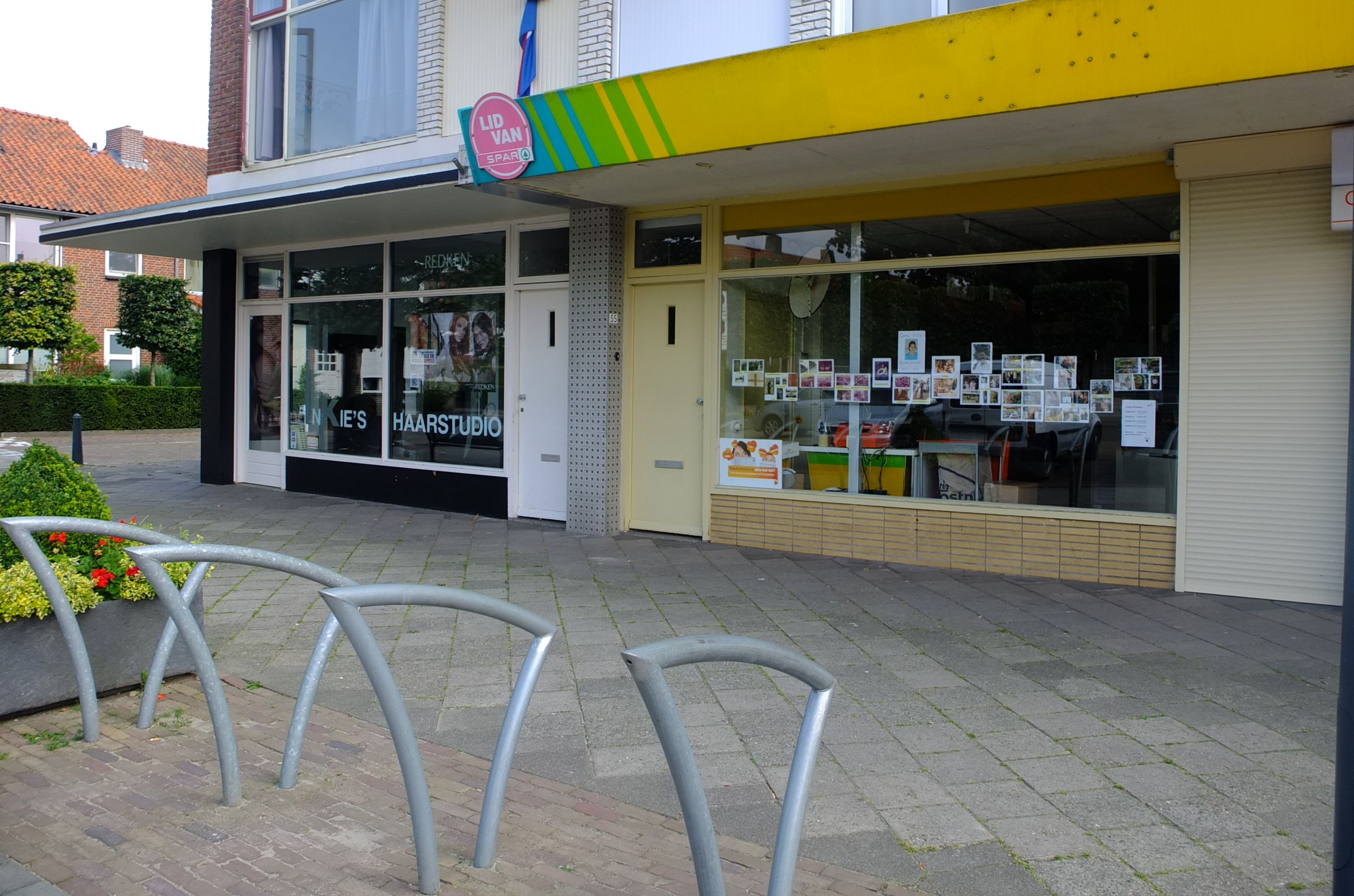
Supermarket

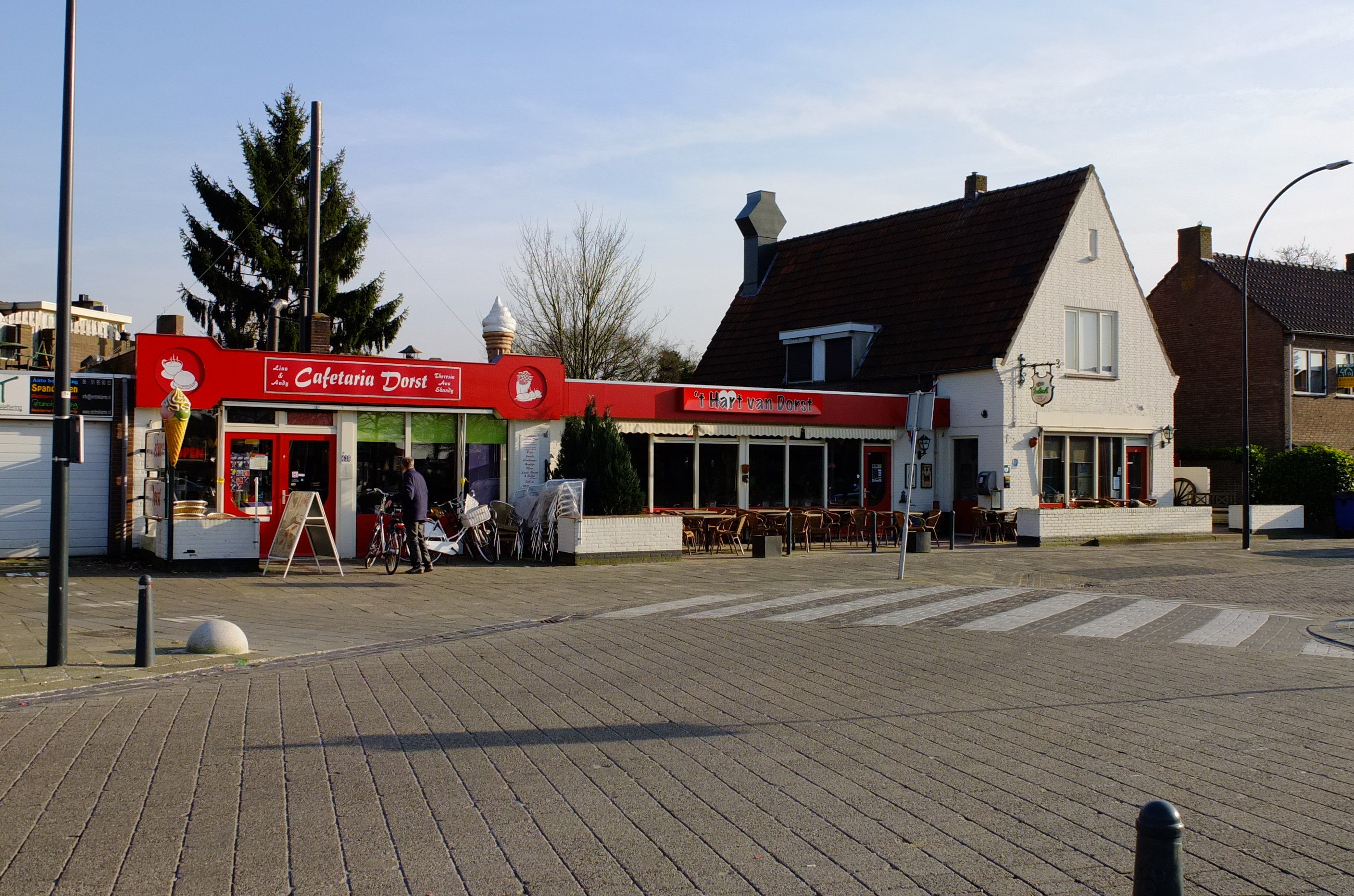
Snackbar

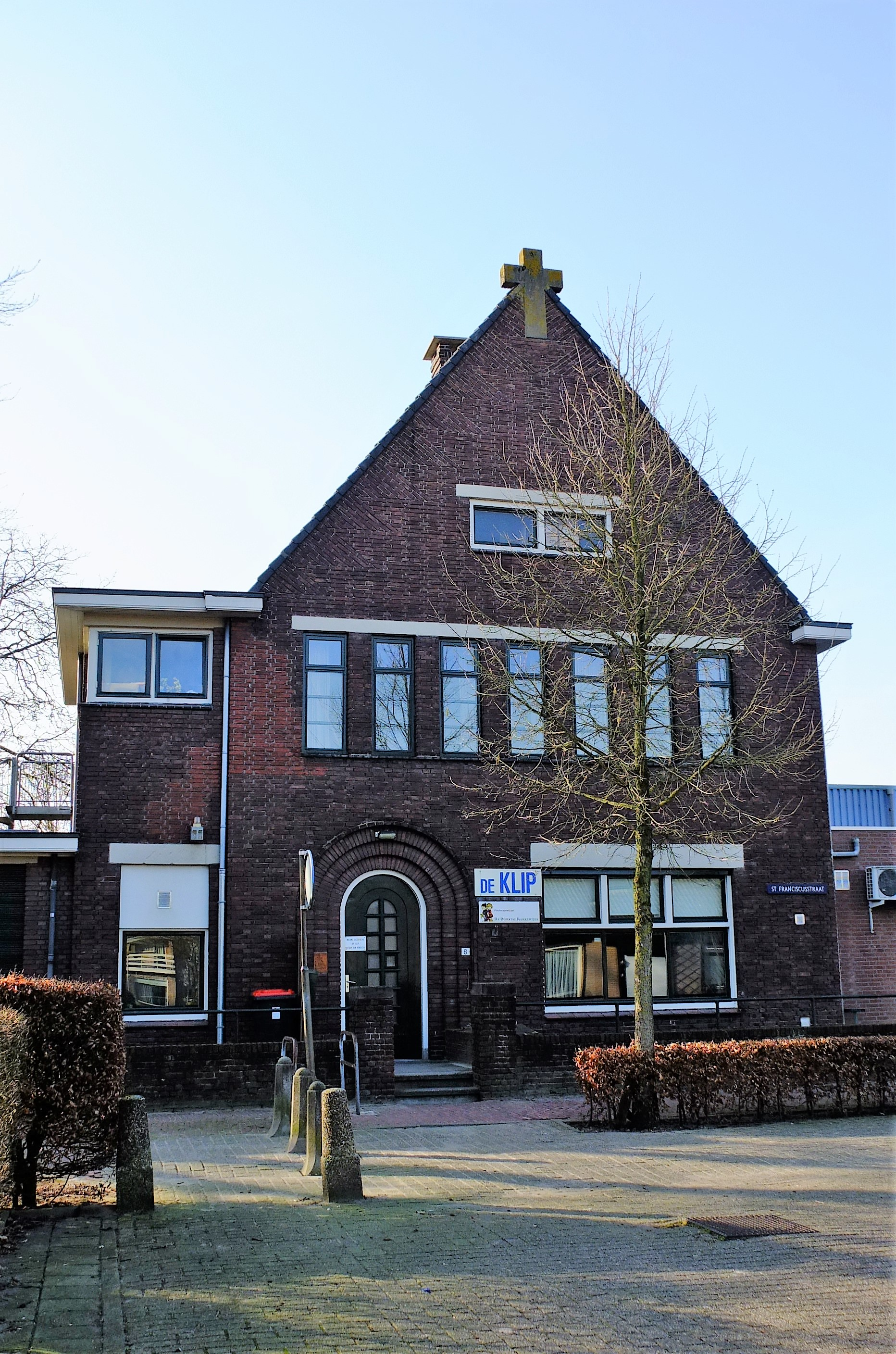
Community house De Klip
