= Oosterhout =

- Municipality
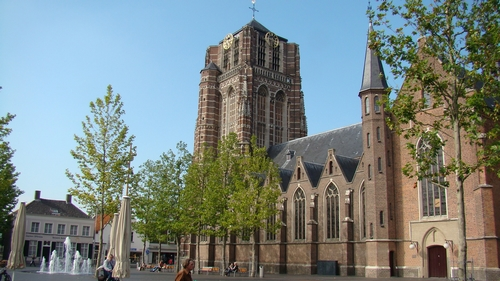
- Market square in Oosterhout

- Flag Coat of arms

- Location in North Brabant
- Coordinates: 51°38′N 4°52′E
- Country: Netherlands
- Province: North Brabant

Government
  - Body: Municipal council
  - Mayor: Marcel Fränzel (acting) (D66)

Area
  - Total: 73.09 km^{2} (28.22 sq mi)
  - Land: 71.47 km^{2} (27.59 sq mi)
  - Water: 1.62 km^{2} (0.63 sq mi)
- Elevation: 5 m (16 ft)

Population (2026)
  - Total: 58,739
  - Density: 786/km^{2} (2,040/sq mi)
  - Town/Settlement: 50,140
- Demonym: Oosterhouter
- Time zone: UTC+1 (CET)
  - Summer (DST): UTC+2 (CEST)
- Postcode: 4849, 4900–4911
- Area code: 0162
- Website: www.oosterhout.nl

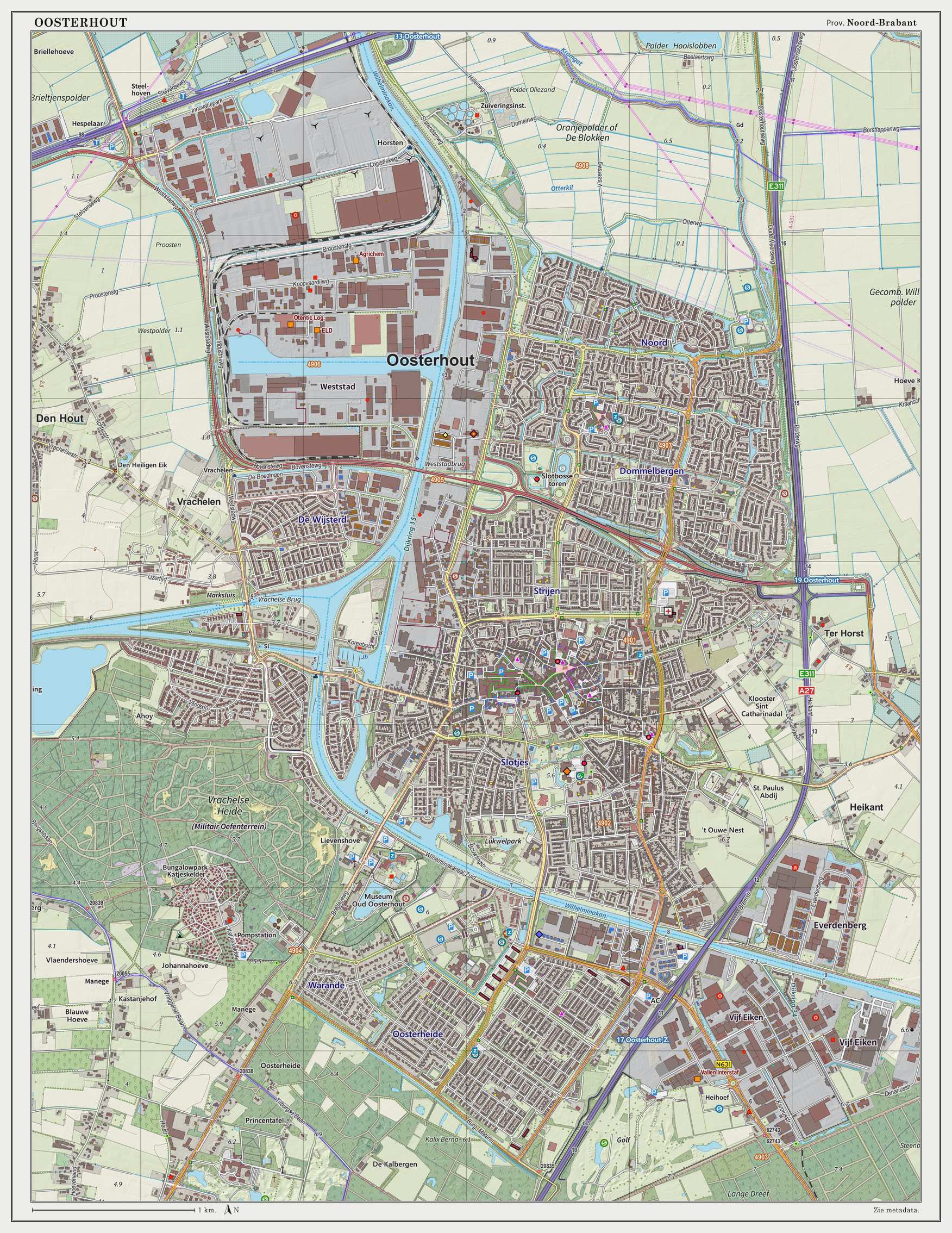
Dutch topographic map of Oosterhout, as per March 2014

Oosterhout (Dutch pronunciation: [ˈoːstərɦʌut]; from ooster, "eastern", and hout, "woods") is a municipality and a city in North Brabant in southern Netherlands. The municipality had a population of 56,206 in 2021.

== Population centers ==
The municipality of Oosterhout includes the following places:

- Baarschot
- Den Hout
- Dorst
- Eind van den Hout
- Groenendijk
- Heikant
- Heistraat
- Hespelaar
- Oosteind
- Oosterhout (city)
- Seters
- Steenoven
- Ter Aalst
- Vijfhuizen
- Vrachelen

== History ==
Oosterhout is mentioned for the first time in 1277, although archaeological excavations showed the existence of human settlements in the area in prehistoric times. The Knights Templar had a temple here dedicated to John the Baptist. It was home to a castle which later acquired control over the surrounding area, up to Breda and Bergen op Zoom. The castle was destroyed by Spanish troops during the Eighty Years War, in 1573; only a tower of it survives today.

The city became the seat of a flourishing ceramics industry, which lasted until the 19th century. In 1625 the city was besieged by Frederick Henry, Prince of Orange, and suffered heavy damage.

Despite the rise of Protestantism, it was home to several Catholic monasteries, including that of the Premonstratensians, which is still active. Oosterhout received city rights in 1809, by will of Louis Bonaparte.

== Main sights ==
- Slotjes (lit. 'Locks'), castles and mansions in the city
- Unfinished basilica of St. John. A Romanesque church existed in 1277, but from around 1473 it was rebuilt in the current Gothic style, being finished in 1493. The tower was constructed from 1519 to 1552. It has been restored several times in the following centuries.
- Monastery of St. Catherine, once a castle held by the Knights Hospitaller.
- Slotbossetoren, the remnant of a destroyed 13th century castle

== Culture ==
De anoniemen, a group of statues made by Paul Elshout ,located in Slotpark.

== Sport ==
Oosterhout is home to several sports clubs, including volleyball club VOKO, football clubs VV SCO, VV Oosterhout, baseball club Twins, and field hockey club De Warande. Twins

=== Sport clubs ===
- VV Oosterhout, football
- VV SCO, football
- Scorpio, athletics
- VV TSC, football
- Twins Oosterhout, baseball
- VOKO, volleyball
- De Voltreffers, korfball
- De Warande, hockey
- OZ&PC De Warande, swimming and water polo

== Notable people ==
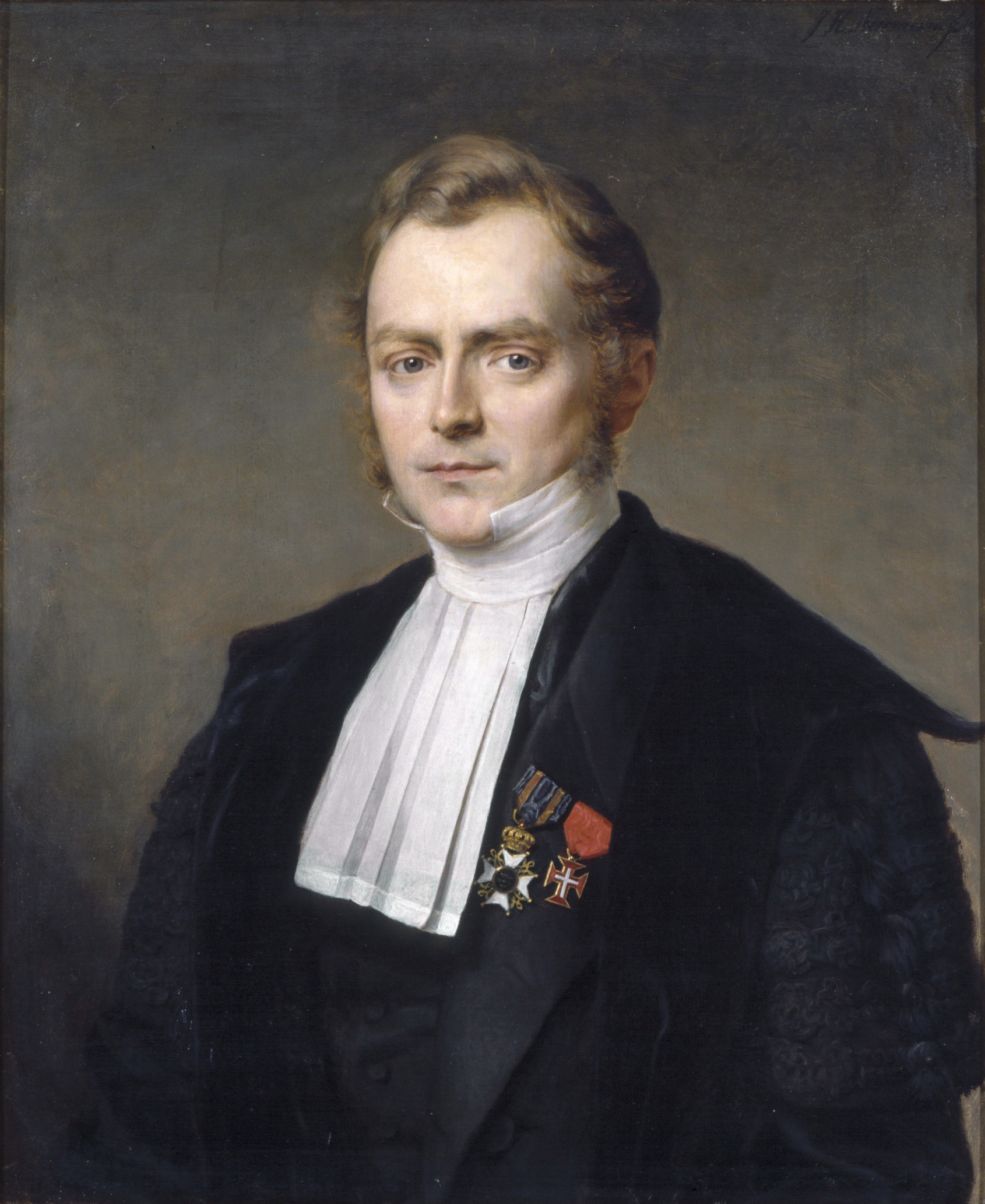
WH de Vriese, 1891

- Willem Hendrik de Vriese (1806–1862) a Dutch botanist and physician
- Christiaan Snouck Hurgronje (1857–1936) a Dutch scholar of Oriental cultures and advisor to the colonial government of the Netherlands East Indies
- Marinus De Jong (1891-1984) a Belgian composer and pianist of Dutch origin
- Gerrit Brokx (1933–2002) a Dutch politician
- Johannes Wilhelmus Maria Liesen (born 1960) a Dutch clergyman and bishop of the Roman Catholic Diocese of Breda
- Mirjam Mous (born 1963) a Dutch author of children's literature
- Marlies Dekkers (born 1965) a Dutch fashion designer
- Extince (born 1967) a Dutch rapper
- Sander P. Zwegers (born 1975) a Dutch mathematician and academic

=== Sport ===
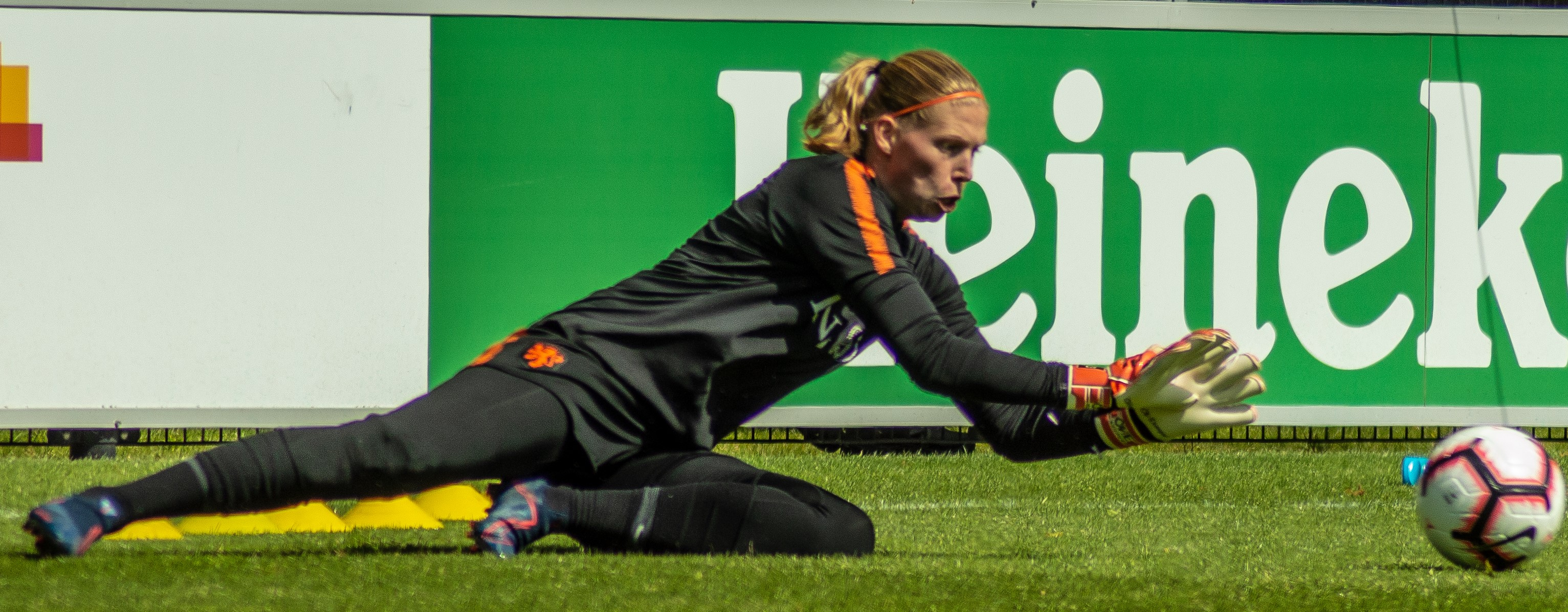
Jennifer Vreugdenhil, 2019

- Kees Pijl (1897–1976) a Dutch footballer who played in 203 games for Feyenoord, competed in the 1924 Summer Olympics
- Wanny van Gils (1959–2018) a Dutch football player with over 300 club games and coach
- Kelly van Zon (born 1987) a Dutch table tennis player who had medalled in five Summer Paralympic Games
- Wesley Vissers (born 1993) a Dutch professional bodybuilder
- Jennifer Vreugdenhil (born 1995) a Dutch footballer who played in one game for the Netherlands national team
- Niels Laros (born 2005) a Dutch middle- and long-distance runner

== Gallery ==
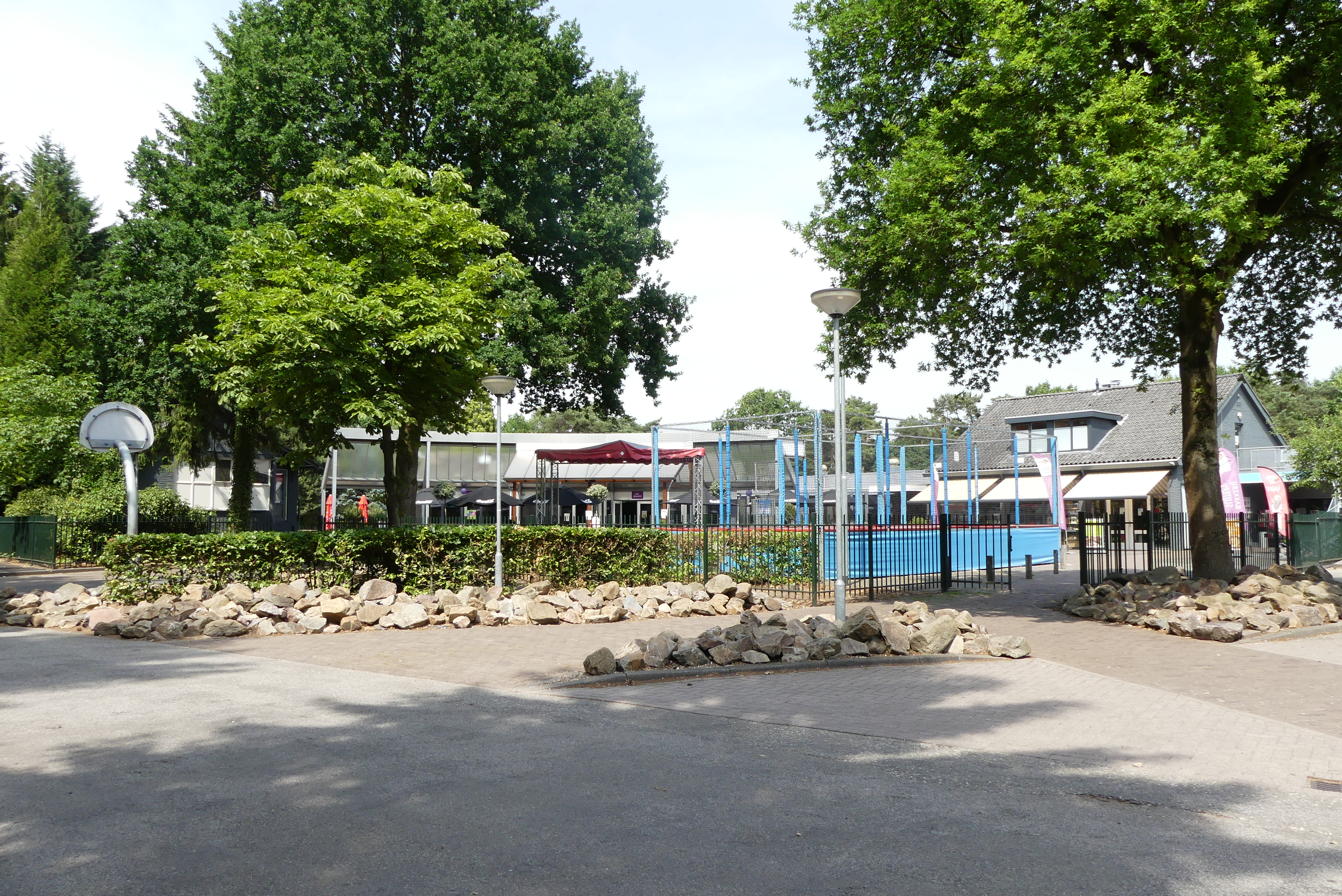
Katjeskelder Oosterhout

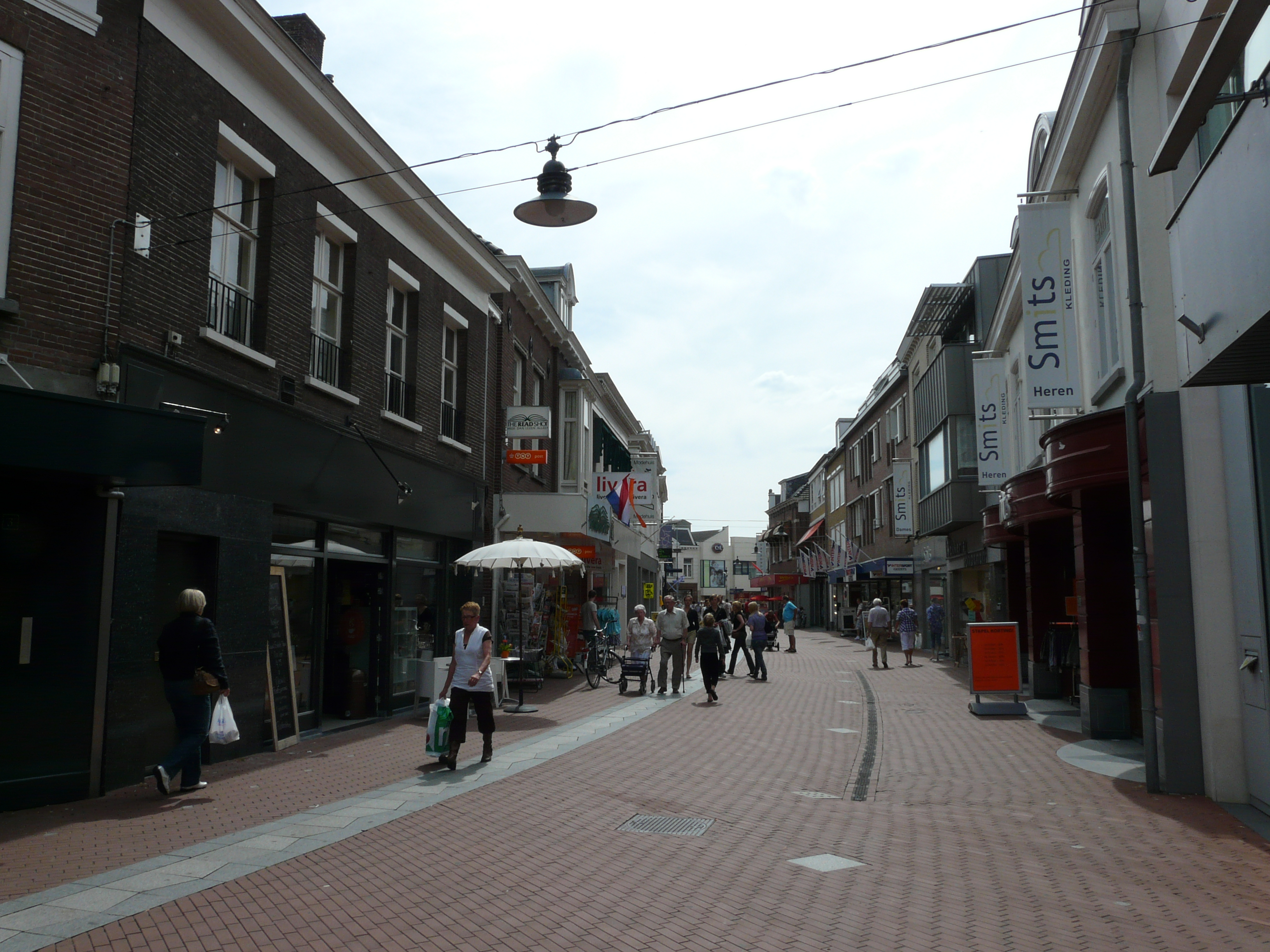
Oosterhout centrum

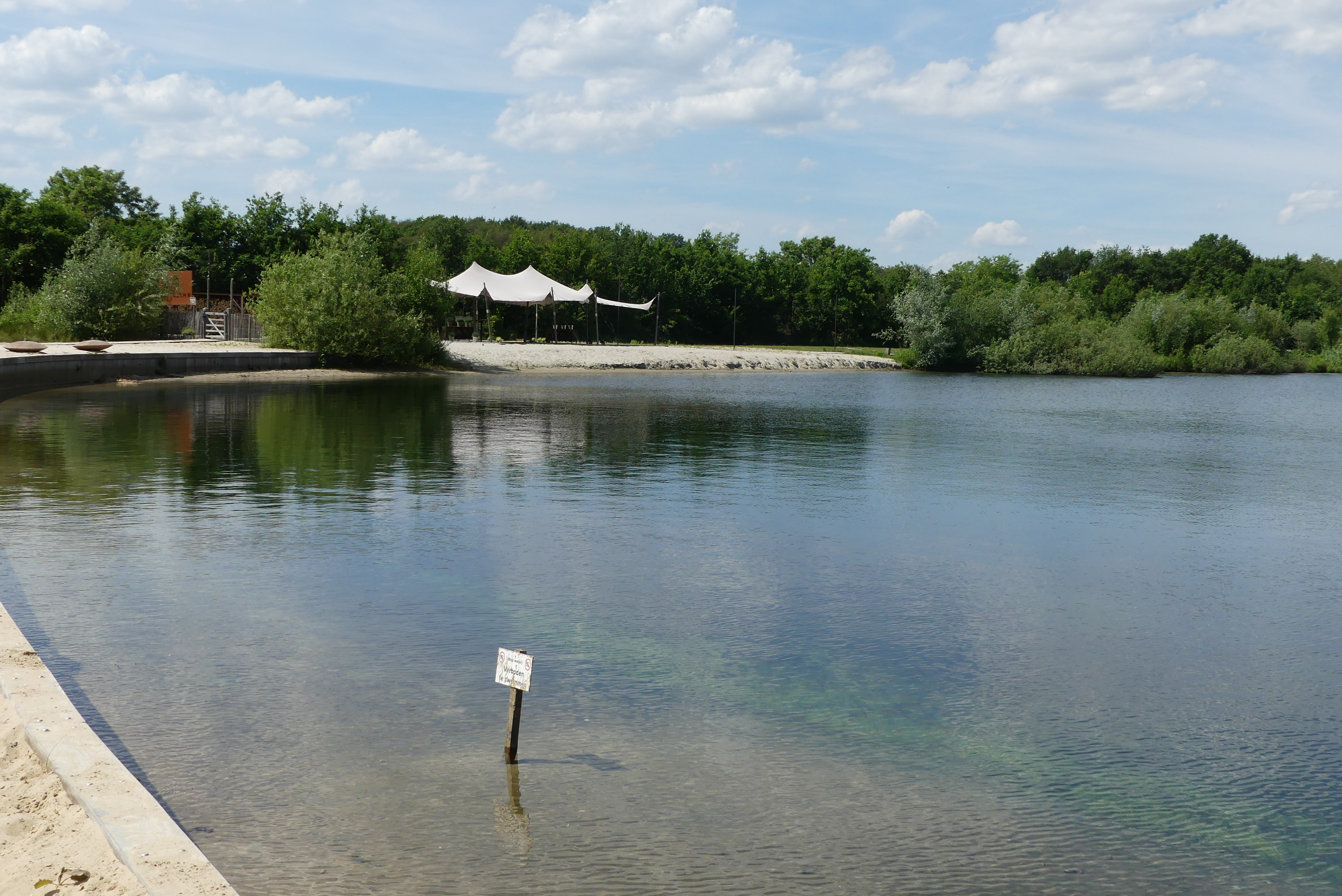
Put van Caron Oosterhout
