= Storks (sports club) =

Storks is a baseball and softball team based in The Hague, The Netherlands. Storks' baseball team plays in the Honkbal Hoofdklasse, the top level of baseball in the Netherlands. The club also won three consecutive Dutch softball titles, winning the 2004, 2005 and 2006 Holland Series.

== History ==
The club was founded with 12 members on one team in 1952. By 1956, the club was fielding three men's baseball teams and that year added its first women's softball team. Pitcher Win Remmerswaal played for the Storks in the early 1970s, before signing with the Boston Red Sox. In 1975, the team moved to its current field at the Kijkduincomplex. The Storks have played in the Hoofdklasse since 2018.
