= Twins Oosterhout =

Dutch baseball and softball club

Logo	Cap insignia

Information
- League: Honkbal Hoofdklasse
- Location: Oosterhout, Netherlands
- Ballpark: Sportpark de Slotbosse Toren
- Founded: 1969
- Colors: Dark blue, orange and white
- Manager: Rob Ushy
- Website: oosterhouttwins.nl

Twins Oosterhout is baseball and softball club based in Oosterhout, the Netherlands. The Twins have played in the Honkbal Hoofdklasse since 2016. The team plays its home games at Sportpark de Slotbosse Toren.

== History ==
The club was established in 1969 and has been known as "Twins" since 1976, following the merger of two clubs.

Former Rakuten Golden Eagles pitcher Keiji Uezono played for the Twins in 2016. He went 4–1 with a 1.68 ERA in 59 innings pitched.

In 2021, the Twins began an exchange program with the Ibaraki Astro Planets of the Baseball Challenge League. Under the program, two Japanese players from the Astro Planets roster are playing with the Twins for the 2021 season. In the future the Twins will also be able to send players and/or coaches to the Astro Planets to participate in a full Baseball Challenge League season.

In 2023, American politician J.D Scholten pitched for the Twins, going 2 –1 with a 4.50 ERA and 31 strikeouts in 26 innings pitched.

On 16 October 2024, Canadian Rob Ushy was announced as manager of the team ahead of the 2025 season.

== Current roster ==
Twins Oosterhout roster – 2026 Honkbal Hoofdklasse season
Active roster		Coaches
Pitchers: 27 (Curaçao) Nelmerson Angela; 10 (Netherlands) Lucas den Duijn; 17 (Germany) Simon Groß; 19 (Netherlands) Misja Harcksen; 34 (Belgium) Zane Hendrikx; 43 (Japan) Ayumu Ishikawa; 55 (Netherlands) Finn Kops; 37 (Netherlands) Mauro van Mook; 30 (Netherlands) Rens Römgens; 84 (Netherlands) Stijn van der Schaaf; 21 (Netherlands) Jurgen Zwitzer	Catchers: 18 (Netherlands) Ben van Dulken; 7 (Netherlands) Dion Frank; 28 (Belgium) Axel Poesmans; Infielders: 16 (Curaçao) Railison Bentura; 26 (Curaçao) Terrence Garcia; 23 (Netherlands) Jerzy van Gool; 3 (Netherlands) Onne van Gool; 9 (Netherlands) Nando Mostaert; 5 (Netherlands) Faas Sluijter; 22 (Netherlands) Daan Verpaalen; Outfielders: 13 (Netherlands) Luuk Bun; 6 (United States) Robb Paller; 2 (Netherlands) Thijmen Peters; 44 (Netherlands) Yves Poesmans; Utility players: 8 (Netherlands) Gijs van Zalingen	Manager: 4 (Canada) Rob Ushy; Coaches: 24 Jacinto de Gouveia (first base); 43 (Belgium) Sven Hendrickx (third base); Roster updated on 20 July 2026

== Baseball Champions League Europe record ==
Year	Venue	Finish	Wins	Losses	Win%	Manager
2026	(Germany) Regensburg	5th	1	2	.333	(Canada) Rob Ushy
Total			1	2	.333	
