= DSS Haarlem =

Dutch baseball and softball club (founded in 1950)

- Logo

Information
- League: Eerste Klasse
- Location: Haarlem, the Netherlands
- Ballpark: Pim Mulier Stadium
- Founded: 1950
- 2019: 13-29 (7th place out of 8 teams)
- Defeated Kinheim in promotion/relegation playoff
- Former league: Honkbal Hoofdklasse
- Colors: Red, black and white
- Chairman: Peter Vink
- Website: DSSHonkSoftbal.nl

DSS is a baseball and softball club based in Haarlem, the Netherlands that plays in the second-tier Eerste Klasse.

From 2020 to 2024, DSS has fielded a combined team with fellow Haarlem baseball club Kinheim in the Honkbal Hoofdklasse, the top Dutch baseball league. DSS was unable to participate in the Hoofdklasse due to financial difficulties, and Kinheim lost a relegation playoff to DSS in 2019, 3 games to 2. The partnership enabled the combined clubs to continue fielding a team from Haarlem in the Hoofdklasse. The two clubs had both played their home games at the complex that includes Pim Mulier Stadium.

On 14 August 2024, DSS and Kinheim jointly announced a change to their operating agreement beginning in 2025, with DSS competing in the lower Eerste Klasse while Kinheim continued to have a team in the Hoofdklasse. The clubs stated that the Royal Netherlands Baseball and Softball Federation (KNBSB), the national governing body for baseball, supported the change.

DSS won the Eerste Klasse title in 2025.

DSS's top women's softball team competes in the Dutch Derde Klasse. The softball team has won the Dutch national championship eight times.
