= Willem Hendrik de Vriese =

Dutch botanist and physician

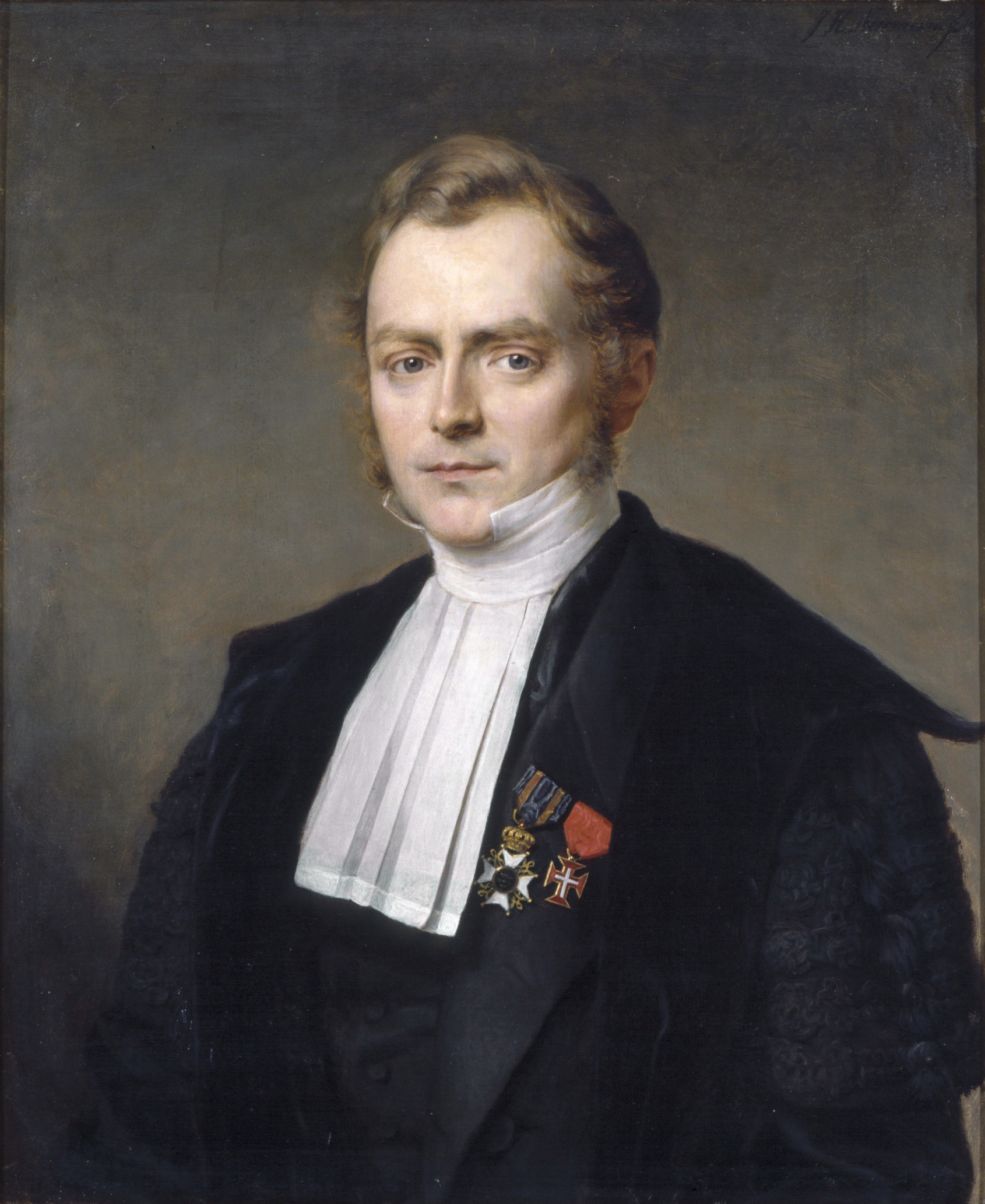
- Willem Hendrik de Vriese (painted by Jan Hendrik Neuman)
- Born: 11 August 1806; Oosterhout
- Died: 23 January 1862 (aged 55); Leiden
- Education: Leiden University
- Spouse: Charlotta Theodora Antonia Bosse (m. 1831)
- Scientific career
- Fields: Chemistry; Botany; Natural history
- Workplaces: Leiden University
- Thesis: Specimen academicum medicum quo praecipuae exponuntur methodi, quibus utitur therapeutice natiralis, ad sanandos corporis humani morbos chronicos (1830)
- Author abbrev. (botany): de Vriese

Willem Hendrik de Vriese (11 August 1806 – 23 January 1862) was a Dutch botanist and medical doctor born in Oosterhout, North Brabant.

== Education ==
Willem Hendrik de Vriese studied medicine at the University of Leiden, earning his doctorate in 1831.

== Career ==
He practiced medicine in Rotterdam, where he also gave classes in botany at the medical school. In 1834, he was appointed associate professor of botany at the Athenaeum Illustré in Amsterdam, and in 1841 was promoted to full professor. In 1845, he became a professor of botany at Leiden and successor to Caspar Georg Carl Reinwardt (1773–1854) at the Hortus Botanicus Leiden. He became a member of the Royal Dutch Institute of Sciences, Literature and Fine Arts in 1838.

In October 1857, he was commissioned to conduct botanical investigations in the Dutch East Indies, and consequently spent the following years performing research in Java, Borneo, Sumatra and the Moluccas. In March 1861, he returned to the Netherlands in a weakened state, and died in Leiden several months later.

== Published works ==
Among de Vriese's written works was the first part of "Hortus Spaarne-Bergensis" (1839), a catalogue of banker Adriaan van der Hoop's exotic plant collection. He was an editor of Caspar Reinwardt's scientific works, two years after Reinwardt's death, he published "Plantae Indiae Batavae Orientalis: quas, in itinere per insulas Archipelagi Indici Javam, Amboinam, Celebem, Ternatam, aliasque, annis 1815-1821 exploravit Casp. Georg. Carol. Reinwardt" (1856). He was the author of a memoir on Franz Julius Ferdinand Meyen as well as of noteworthy treatises on cinchona (1855), vanilla (1856) and camphor (1856). Also, he published monographs on the genus Rafflesia and of the botanical family Marattiaceae (with biologist Pieter Harting 1812-1885).

== Vriesea ==
The botanical genus Vriesea (family Bromeliaceae) was named in de Vriese's honor by British botanist John Lindley (1799–1865).

== See also ==
- Taxa named by Willem Hendrik de Vriese
