= Netherlands at the 2008 Summer Olympics =

- Flag of the Netherlands
- IOC code: NED
- NOC: Dutch Olympic Committee*; Dutch Sports Federation
- Website: www.nocnsf.nl (in Dutch)

in Beijing
- Competitors: 243 in 20 sports
- Flag bearers: Jeroen Delmee (opening); Maarten van der Weijden (closing)
- Medals Ranked 11th: Gold 7 Silver 5 Bronze 4 Total 16

Summer Olympics appearances (overview)
- 1900; 1904; 1908; 1912; 1920; 1924; 1928; 1932; 1936; 1948; 1952; 1956; 1960; 1964; 1968; 1972; 1976; 1980; 1984; 1988; 1992; 1996; 2000; 2004; 2008; 2012; 2016; 2020; 2024; 2028

Other related appearances
- 1906 Intercalated Games

The Netherlands competed at the 2008 Summer Olympics in Beijing, People's Republic of China. This was announced in an official statement on the NOC*NSF website. In the statement they named the Olympic Games and the Paralympic Games as a highlight in sports to which a lot of sportspeople, coaches and the Dutch sports fans would look forward. The Netherlands aimed for a top 10 nations ranking in the Olympics as well as a top 25 ranking in the Paralympics; they ended up ranking 12th at the Games.

Further in the statement they announced that they were aware of the political discussions about human rights and other issues in the People's Republic of China and that they encouraged these discussions, but that they would only participate in sports related discussions. They say individual sportspeople, coaches and managers might have their own opinions about the issues but these would always be conveyed as personal opinions deriving from their own social views. They believe sports activities do have the opportunity to positively influence the situation in the People's Republic of China when it comes to implementing the sports rules correctly as well as in situations improving the levels of respect, solidarity and fair play in sports.

There were 243 athletes representing the Netherlands. 15 in athletics, 24 in baseball, 2 in canoeing, 27 in cycling, 8 in equestrian, 2 in fencing, 32 in field hockey, 18 in football, 2 in gymnastics, 10 in judo, 30 in rowing, 12 in sailing, 15 in softball, 21 in swimming, 3 in table tennis, 1 in taekwondo, 2 in triathlon, 6 in volleyball and 13 in water polo. 61 different athletes won a medal, which is 25.10% of all athletes. With a gold and a silver medal Anky van Grunsven was the only multiple medalist. The athletes that qualified for the 2008 Summer Olympics are listed below.

== Medalists ==
Medal	Name	Sport	Event
Gold	Inge Dekker; Ranomi Kromowidjojo; Femke Heemskerk; Marleen Veldhuis; Hinkelien Schreuder*; Manon van Rooijen*	Swimming	Women's 4 × 100 m freestyle relay
Gold	Marit van Eupen; Kirsten van der Kolk	Rowing	Women's lightweight double sculls
Gold	Marianne Vos	Cycling	Women's points race
Gold	Anky van Grunsven	Equestrian	Individual dressage
Gold	Maarten van der Weijden	Swimming	Men's 10 km open water
Gold	Netherlands women's national water polo team: Iefke van Belkum; Gillian van den Berg; Daniëlle de Bruijn; Mieke Cabout; Rianne Guichelaar; Biurakn Hakhverdian; Marieke van den Ham; Noeki Klein; Simone Koot; Ilse van der Meijden; Meike de Nooy; Alette Sijbring; Yasemin Smit	Water polo	Women's tournament
Gold	Netherlands women's national field hockey team: Marilyn Agliotti; Naomi van As; Minke Booij; Wieke Dijkstra; Miek van Geenhuizen; Maartje Goderie; Eva de Goede; Ellen Hoog; Fatima Moreira de Melo; Eefke Mulder; Maartje Paumen; Sophie Polkamp; Lisanne de Roever; Janneke Schopman; Minke Smabers; Lidewij Welten	Field hockey	Women's tournament
Silver	Deborah Gravenstijn	Judo	Women's 57 kg
Silver	Anky van Grunsven; Hans Peter Minderhoud; Imke Schellekens-Bartels	Equestrian	Team dressage
Silver	Annemieke Bes; Mandy Mulder; Merel Witteveen	Sailing	Yngling class
Silver	Femke Dekker; Annemiek de Haan; Nienke Kingma; Roline Repelaer van Driel; Annemarieke van Rumpt; Sarah Siegelaar; Marlies Smulders; Helen Tanger; Ester Workel	Rowing	Women's eight
Silver	Lobke Berkhout; Marcelien de Koning	Sailing	Women's 470 class
Bronze	Ruben Houkes	Judo	Men's 60 kg
Bronze	Elisabeth Willeboordse	Judo	Women's 63 kg
Bronze	Edith Bosch	Judo	Women's 70 kg
Bronze	Henk Grol	Judo	Men's 100 kg

== Ambassadors ==
The NOC*NSF announced a total of eleven athletes as their official ambassadors in the period before, during and after the Olympics in 2008 until the end of that year. The ambassadors that were chosen were all athletes who had a good chance of qualifying for the Olympics or who had already achieved qualification individually or with their team. They were a mixture of men, women, individual athletes, team athletes, Olympians and Paralympians. Chefs de Mission were Charles van Commenée (Olympics) and Thea Limbach (Paralympics).

The eleven ambassadors were:

- Anky van Grunsven, Equestrian, 2 times gold and 4 times silver at previous Olympics, 2 times World and 4 times European champion.
- Edith Bosch, Judoka, 2004 Summer Olympics silver medallist, World champion and double European champion.
- Kees Luyckx, Footballer.
- Kenny van Weeghel, Wheeler, 2004 Summer Paralympics gold, silver and bronze medallist, 4 times World and 3 times European champion.
- Lobke Berkhout, Sailor, triple 470-class World champion together with De Koning.
- Marcelien de Koning, Sailor, triple 470-class World champion together with Berkhout.
- Marije Smits, Paralympic runner and long jumper, 2002 World champion in long jumping.
- Marleen Veldhuis, Swimmer, 2004 Summer Olympics bronze medallist, 2 times World and 11 times European champion.
- Minke Booij, Field hockey player, silver and bronze at previous Olympics, World champion and triple European champion.
- Rutger Smith, Discus thrower and shot putter, silver (shot put) and bronze (discus) medallist at World championships.
- Theo Bos, Track cyclist, 2004 Summer Olympics silver medallist, 5 times World and 3 times European champion.

== Athletics ==
Dutch athletes have so far achieved qualifying standards in the following athletics events (up to a maximum of 3 athletes in each event at the 'A' Standard, and 1 at the 'B' Standard). Simon Vroemen, who qualified for the steeplechase event, was tested positive for the banned anabolic steroid dianabol in July 2008.

Key

- Note–Ranks given for track events are within the athlete's heat only
- Q = Qualified for the next round
- q = Qualified for the next round as a fastest loser or, in field events, by position without achieving the qualifying target
- NR = National record
- N/A = Round not applicable for the event
- Bye = Athlete not required to compete in round

Men
Track & road events

Athlete	Event	Heat		Quarterfinal		Semifinal		Final	
Athlete	Event	Result	Rank	Result	Rank	Result	Rank	Result	Rank
Robert Lathouwers	800 m	1:46.94	3	—N/a		Did not advance			
Kamiel Maase	Marathon	—N/a						2:20:30	39
Gregory Sedoc	110 m hurdles	13.54	4 Q	13.43	3 Q	13.60	6	Did not advance	
Marcel van der Westen	110 m hurdles	13.50	2 Q	13.48	4 q	13.45	6	Did not advance	
Caimin Douglas; Maarten Heisen; Guus Hoogmoed; Gregory Sedoc; Virgil Spier; Patrick van Luijk	4 × 100 m relay	38.87	3 Q	—N/a				DSQ	

Field events

Athlete	Event	Qualification		Final	
Athlete	Event	Distance	Position	Distance	Position
Rutger Smith	Shot put	20.13	10 Q	20.41	8
Rutger Smith	Discus throw	65.65	3 Q	65.39	7

Combined events – Decathlon

Athlete	Event	100 m	LJ	SP	HJ	400 m	110H	DT	PV	JT	1500 m	Final	Rank
Eugène Martineau	Result	11.19	7.19	13.78	1.99	49.99	14.73	44.09	4.70	71.44	4:37.96	8055	13
Eugène Martineau	Points	819	859	715	794	815	882	748	819	911	693	8055	13

Women
Track & road events

Athlete	Event	Final	
Athlete	Event	Result	Rank
Hilda Kibet	10000 m	31:29.69	15
Lornah Kiplagat	10000 m	30:40.27	8

Combined events – Heptathlon

Athlete	Event	100H	HJ	SP	200 m	LJ	JT	800 m	Final	Rank
Laurien Hoos	Result	13.52	1.65	14.98	24.57	5.74	48.54	DNS	DNF	
Laurien Hoos	Points	1047	795	860	927	771	832	0	DNF	
Jolanda Keizer	Result	13.90	1.83	15.15	23.97	6.15	42.76	2:15.21	6370 PB	9*
Jolanda Keizer	Points	993	1016	871	984	896	720	890	6370 PB	9*

* The athlete who finished in second place, Lyudmila Blonska of Ukraine, tested positive for a banned substance. Both the A and the B tests were positive, therefore Blonska was stripped of her silver medal, and Keizer moved up a position.

== Baseball ==
The qualification criteria for baseball were the same as the international standards. For European countries the first ranked team at the 2007 European Championship would qualify directly, while the second and third ranked teams would qualify for an extra qualification round. The Dutch team became first in the European Championship, securing their spot in Beijing.

Roster

- Sharnol Adriana
- David Bergman
- Leon Boyd
- Yurendell de Caster
- Rob Cordemans
- Dave Draijer
- Michael Duursma
- Bryan Engelhardt
- Percy Isenia
- Sidney de Jong
- Michiel van Kampen
- Eugene Kingsale
- Dirk van 't Klooster
- Roel Koolen
- Reily Legito
- Diego Markwell
- Shairon Martis
- Martijn Meeuwis
- Danny Rombley
- Jeroen Sluijter
- Tjerk Smeets
- Alexander Smit
- Juan Carlos Sulbaran
- Pim Walsma

Loek van Mil was originally selected in the squad, but withdrew from the tournament before the games had been started. He was replaced by Draijer.

Results

Team	G	W	L	RS	RA	WIN%	GB	Tiebreaker
South Korea	7	7	0	41	22	1.000	-	-
Cuba	7	6	1	52	23	.857	1	-
United States	7	5	2	40	22	.714	2	-
Japan	7	4	3	30	14	.571	3	-
Chinese Taipei	7	2	5	29	33	.286	5	1–0
Canada	7	2	5	29	20	.286	5	0–1
Netherlands	7	1	6	9	50	.143	6	1–0
China	7	1	6	14	60	.143	6	0–1

Team	1	2	3	4	5	6	7	8	9	R	H	E
Netherlands	0	0	0	0	0	0	0	0	0	0	4	1
Chinese Taipei	0	1	0	3	0	1	0	0	X	5	7	0
WP: Wei-Yin Chen (1–0) LP: David Bergman (0–1)

Team	1	2	3	4	5	6	7	8	9	R	H	E
United States	0	1	0	4	0	0	1	1	-	7	10	0
Netherlands	0	0	0	0	0	0	0	0	-	0	1	0
WP: Stephen Strasburg (1–0) LP: Shairon Martis (0–1); Home runs: USA: Matt Brown (1), Matt Laporta (1); NED: None

Team	1	2	3	4	5	6	7	8	9	R	H	E
Netherlands	0	0	0	0	0	0	0	0	0	0	4	1
Japan	4	0	0	0	0	0	0	2	X	6	10	0
WP: Toshiya Sugiuchi (1–0) LP: Alexander Smit (0–1); Home runs: NED: None; JPN: Takahiko Sato (1)

Team	1	2	3	4	5	6	7	8	9	R	H	E
Netherlands	0	0	0	1	5	0	0	0	0	6	9	1
China	0	0	1	0	1	0	0	1	1	4	11	1
WP: Leon Boyd (1–0) LP: Kai Liu (0–1) Sv: David Bergman (1); Home runs: NED: Sharnol Adriana (1), Sidney de Jong (1), Bryan Engelhardt (1); CHN: None

Team	1	2	3	4	5	6	7	8	9	R	H	E
Cuba	1	0	0	0	5	4	0	4	-	14	16	0
Netherlands	0	1	1	0	0	0	1	0	-	3	10	2
WP: Jonder Martínez (1–0) LP: Juan Carlos Sulbaran (0–1); Home runs: CUB: None; NED: Bryan Engelhardt (2), Percy Isenia (1)

Team	1	2	3	4	5	6	7	8	9	R	H	E
Canada	0	0	1	2	0	0	0	1	0	4	7	1
Netherlands	0	0	0	0	0	0	0	0	0	0	2	0
WP: Brooks McNiven (1–0) LP: Shairon Martis (0–2)

Team	1	2	3	4	5	6	7	8	9	R	H	E
South Korea	2	0	0	0	4	2	0	2	-	10	16	1
Netherlands	0	0	0	0	0	0	0	0	-	0	4	1
WP: Won-Sam Jang (1–0) LP: Alexander Smit (0–2); Home runs: KOR: Dae-Ho Lee (3), Taek-Keun Lee (1); NED: None

== Canoeing ==
=== Slalom ===
Athlete	Event	Preliminary						Semifinal		Final			
Athlete	Event	Run 1	Rank	Run 2	Rank	Total	Rank	Time	Rank	Time	Rank	Total	Rank
Robert Bouten	Men's K-1	86.26	11	88.90	16	175.16	14 Q	88.40	5 Q	139.59	9	227.99	9
Ariane Herde	Women's K-1	102.30	12	117.98	20	222.28	13 Q	117.60	10 Q	114.39	6	231.99	6

== Cycling ==
=== Road ===
Men

Athlete	Event	Time	Rank
Stef Clement	Road race	Did not finish	
Stef Clement	Time trial	1:04:59	9
Laurens ten Dam	Road race	6:34:26	65
Robert Gesink	Road race	6:24:07	10
Robert Gesink	Time trial	1:05:02	10
Karsten Kroon	Road race	Did not finish	
Niki Terpstra	Road race	Did not finish	

Women

Athlete	Event	Time	Rank
Chantal Beltman	Road race	3:37:02	47
Mirjam Melchers	Road race	3:33:17	36
Mirjam Melchers	Time trial	37:51.59	18
Marianne Vos	Road race	3:32:45	6
Marianne Vos	Time trial	36:58.67	14

=== Track ===
Sprint

Athlete	Event	Qualification		Round 1	Repechage 1	Round 2	Quarterfinals	Semifinals	Final	
Athlete	Event	Time Speed (km/h)	Rank	Opposition Time Speed (km/h)	Opposition Time Speed (km/h)	Opposition Time Speed (km/h)	Opposition Time Speed (km/h)	Opposition Time Speed (km/h)	Opposition Time Speed (km/h)	Rank
Theo Bos	Men's sprint	10.318; 69.780	9 Q	French (AUS); W 10.959; 65.699	Bye	Sireau (FRA); W 10.777; 66.808	Bourgain (FRA); L, L	Did not advance	5th place final Sireau (FRA); Mulder (NED); Awang (MAS); L	7
Teun Mulder	Men's sprint	10.373; 69.410	13 Q	Levy (GER); L	French (AUS); Dmitriev (RUS); W 10.889; 66.121	Nimke (GER); W 10.888; 66.127	Levy (GER); L, L	Did not advance	5th place final Sireau (FRA); Bos (NED); Awang (MAS); L	6
Theo Bos; Teun Mulder; Tim Veldt	Men's team sprint	44.213; 61.068	4 Q	Australia; L 44.212; 61.069	—N/a				Did not advance	5
Yvonne Hijgenaar	Women's sprint	11.533; 62.429	10	Meares (AUS); L	Krupeckaitė (LTU); Grankovskaya (RUS); L	—N/a	Did not advance		9th place final Grankovskaya (RUS); Guerra (CUB); Tsukuda (JPN); L	11
Willy Kanis	Women's sprint	11.167; 64.475	4	Guerra (CUB); W 12.155; 59.234	Bye	—N/a	Reed (USA); W 11.944, W 11.767	Pendleton (GBR); L, L	Guo S (CHN); L, L	4

Pursuit

Athlete	Event	Qualification		Semifinals		Finals	
Athlete	Event	Time	Rank	Opponent Results	Rank	Opponent Results	Rank
Jens Mouris	Men's individual pursuit	4:27.445	13	Did not advance			
Jenning Huizenga	Men's individual pursuit	4:37:097	18	Did not advance			
Levi Heimans; Pim Ligthart; Jens Mouris; Robert Slippens; Wim Stroetinga	Men's team pursuit	4:04.806	6 Q	Australia; LAP	—	Did not advance	

Keirin

Athlete	Event	1st round	Repechage	2nd round	Finals
Athlete	Event	Rank	Rank	Rank	Rank
Theo Bos	Men's keirin	2 Q	Bye	5	12
Teun Mulder	Men's keirin	3 R	4	Did not advance	

Omnium

Athlete	Event	Points	Laps	Rank
Peter Schep	Men's points race	0	0	20
Marianne Vos	Women's points race	30	1	1st place, gold medalist(s)
Jens Mouris; Peter Schep	Men's madison	6	−1	8

=== Mountain biking ===
Athlete	Event	Time	Rank
Bart Brentjens	Men's cross-country	LAP (2 laps)	37
Rudi van Houts	Men's cross-country	LAP (2 laps)	34
Elsbeth van Rooy-Vink	Women's cross-country	1:53:30	14

=== BMX ===
Athlete	Event	Seeding		Quarterfinals		Semifinals		Final	
Athlete	Event	Result	Rank	Points	Rank	Points	Rank	Result	Rank
Robert de Wilde	Men's BMX	36.803	23	18	7	Did not advance			
Raymon van der Biezen	Men's BMX	36.112	5	10	3 Q	14	5	Did not advance	
Rob van den Wildenberg	Men's BMX	36.522	18	8	2 Q	9	2 Q	39.772	5
Lieke Klaus	Women's BMX	38.709	11	—N/a		13	5	Did not advance	

== Equestrian ==
=== Dressage ===
Athlete	Horse	Event	Grand Prix		Grand Prix Special		Grand Prix Freestyle		Overall	
Athlete	Horse	Event	Score	Rank	Score	Rank	Score	Rank	Score	Rank
Hans Peter Minderhoud	Exquis Nadine	Individual	69.625	11 Q	70.920	7 Q	75.150	5	73.035	5
Imke Schellekens-Bartels	Sunrise	Individual	70.875	5 Q	Withdrew					
Anky van Grunsven	Salinero	Individual	74.750	2 Q	74.960	2 Q	82.400	1	78.680	1st place, gold medalist(s)
Hans Peter Minderhoud; Imke Schellekens-Bartels; Anky van Grunsven	See above	Team	71.750	4	—N/a				71.750	2nd place, silver medalist(s)

=== Eventing ===
Athlete	Horse	Event	Dressage		Cross-country			Jumping						Total	
Athlete	Horse	Event	Dressage		Cross-country			Qualifier			Final			Total	
Athlete	Horse	Event	Penalties	Rank	Penalties	Total	Rank	Penalties	Total	Rank	Penalties	Total	Rank	Penalties	Rank
Tim Lips	Oncarlos	Individual	52.60	41	22.40	75.00	28	0.00	75.00	21 Q	0.00	75.00	15	75.00	15

=== Show jumping ===
Athlete	Horse	Event	Qualification								Final					Total	
Athlete	Horse	Event	Round 1		Round 2			Round 3			Round A		Round B			Total	
Athlete	Horse	Event	Penalties	Rank	Penalties	Total	Rank	Penalties	Total	Rank	Penalties	Rank	Penalties	Total	Rank	Penalties	Rank
Angelique Hoorn	Blauwendraad's O'Brien	Individual	4	30	4	8	16 Q	8	16	18 Q	0	=1 Q	4	4	=3 JO	8	9
Marc Houtzager	Opium VS	Individual	2	28	1	3	7 Q	5	8	8 Q	0	=1 Q	4	4	=3 JO	8	8
Gerco Schröder	Monaco	Individual	5	39	12	17	37 Q	4	21	29 Q	4	11 Q	12	16	=15	12	16
Vincent Voorn	Alpapillon-Armanie	Individual	0	=1	16	16	35 Q	27	43	44	Did not advance					43	44
Angelique Hoorn; Marc Houtzager; Gerco Schröder; Vincent Voorn	See above	Team	—N/a								17	6	17	34	=4	34	=4

== Fencing ==
Men

Athlete	Event	Round of 64	Round of 32	Round of 16	Quarterfinal	Semifinal	Final / BM	
Athlete	Event	Opposition Score	Opposition Score	Opposition Score	Opposition Score	Opposition Score	Opposition Score	Rank
Bas Verwijlen	Individual épée	Bye	Wang L (CHN); W 15–10	Kauter (SUI); W 15–13	Tagliariol (ITA); L 11–15	Did not advance		

Women

Athlete	Event	Round of 64	Round of 32	Round of 16	Quarterfinal	Semifinal	Final / BM	
Athlete	Event	Opposition Score	Opposition Score	Opposition Score	Opposition Score	Opposition Score	Opposition Score	Rank
Indra Angad-Gaur	Individual foil	El Gammal (EGY); W 13–4	Granbassi (ITA); L 6–11	Did not advance				

== Field hockey ==
The qualification criteria for field hockey were the same as the international standards. For European countries the first three ranked teams at the 2007 European Championships would qualify directly, while the fourth through eighth ranked teams would qualify for an extra qualification round, of which only the winners of three qualification tournaments would qualify. The Dutch men's team was first in the European Championship, while the women's team was second in their Championship, each team securing their spot in Beijing.

=== Men's tournament ===
Roster

The following is the Dutch roster in the men's field hockey tournament of the 2008 Summer Olympics.

Head Coach: Roelant Oltmans

1. Guus Vogels (GK)
3. Geert-Jan Derikx
5. Rob Derikx
6. Thomas Boerma
7. Sander van der Weide
8. Ronald Brouwer
9. Roderick Weusthof
10. Taeke Taekema
11. Laurence Docherty
12. Jeroen Delmee (c)
14. Teun de Nooijer
18. Rob Reckers
19. Matthijs Brouwer
20. Jeroen Hertzberger
23. Timme Hoyng
24. Robert van der Horst

Reserve:

26. Jaap Stockmann (GK)
27. Rogier Hofman

Group play

Pos	Team	Pld	W	D	L	GF	GA	GD	Pts	Qualification
1	Netherlands	5	4	1	0	16	6	+10	13	Semi-finals
2	Australia	5	3	2	0	24	7	+17	11	Semi-finals
3	Great Britain	5	2	2	1	10	7	+3	8	Fifth place game
4	Pakistan	5	2	0	3	11	13	−2	6	Seventh place game
5	Canada	5	1	1	3	10	17	−7	4	Ninth place game
6	South Africa	5	0	0	5	4	25	−21	0	Eleventh place game

11 August 2008
21:00

Netherlands	5–0	South Africa
Taekema 4', 35'; Docherty 44'; Hertzberger 47'; M. Brouwer 66'	Report

Umpires:
Henrik Ehlers (DEN)
Xavier Adell (ESP)

13 August 2008
21:00

Netherlands	1–0	Great Britain
Taekema 63'	Report

Umpires:
Murray Grime (AUS)
Gary Simmonds (RSA)

15 August 2008
10:30

Netherlands	4–2	Canada
Taekema 4', 8', 33'; Weusthof 49'	Report	Deol 12'; Kahlon 64'

Umpires:
Murray Grime (AUS)
Chen Dekang (CHN)

17 August 2008
20:30

Australia	2–2	Netherlands
Ockenden 58'; Doerner 61'	Report	Taekema 55', 70'

Umpires:
Henrik Ehlers (DEN)
Christian Blasch (GER)

19 August 2008
08:30

Netherlands	4–2	Pakistan
Brouwer 41'; Taekema 46', 58'; Hertzberger 69'	Report	Imran 28'; Maqsood 65'

Umpires:
David Leiper (GBR)
Kim Hong-lae (KOR)

Semifinal

21 August 2008
18:00

Netherlands	1–1 (a.e.t.)	Germany
Hoyng 66'	Report	P. Zeller 68'
Penalties
Taekema (penalty shoot-out scored); R. Brouwer (penalty shoot-out scored); Reckers (penalty shoot-out missed); Weusthof (penalty shoot-out missed); De Nooijer (penalty shoot-out scored) --- Taekema (penalty shoot-out missed)	3–4	(penalty shoot-out scored) C. Zeller; (penalty shoot-out missed) Keller; (penalty shoot-out scored) Meinert; (penalty shoot-out missed) P. Zeller; (penalty shoot-out scored) Weißenborn --- (penalty shoot-out scored) C. Zeller

Umpires:
David Gentles (AUS)
John Wright (RSA)

Bronze medal match

23 August 2008
18:00

Netherlands	2–6	Australia (bronze)
Taekema 12'; De Nooijer 27'	Report	Ockenden 5', 6'; Abbott 9'; Matheson 28'; Hammond 42'; Doerner 62'

Umpires:
Andy Mair (GBR)
Christian Blasch (GER)

=== Women's tournament ===
Roster

The following is the Dutch roster in the women's field hockey tournament of the 2008 Summer Olympics.

Head Coach: Marc Lammers

1. Lisanne de Roever (GK)
3. Eefke Mulder
4. Fatima Moreira de Melo
7. Miek van Geenhuizen
9. Wieke Dijkstra
11. Maartje Goderie
12. Lidewij Welten
13. Minke Smabers
14. Minke Booij (c)
15. Janneke Schopman
17. Maartje Paumen
18. Naomi van As
19. Ellen Hoog
21. Sophie Polkamp
24. Eva de Goede
27. Marilyn Agliotti

Reserve:

10. Kelly Jonker
22. Floortje Engels (GK)

Group play

Team	Pld	W	D	L	GF	GA	GD	Pts	Qualification
Netherlands	5	5	0	0	14	3	+11	15	Advanced to semifinals
China	5	3	1	1	14	4	+10	10	Advanced to semifinals
Australia	5	3	1	1	17	9	+8	10	
Spain	5	2	0	3	4	12	−8	6	
South Korea	5	1	0	4	13	18	−5	3	
South Africa	5	0	0	5	2	18	−16	0	

10 August 2008
20:30

Netherlands	6–0	South Africa
Mulder 5'; Agliotti 27'; Paumen 46', 58'; Booij 56'; Dijkstra 66'	Report

Umpires:
Lisa Roach (AUS)
Carolina de la Fuente (ARG)

12 August 2008
20:30

Netherlands	3–2	South Korea
Paumen 3', 55'; Schopman 7'	Report	Lee Seon-ok 4', 39'

Umpires:
Julie Ashton-Lucy (AUS)
Ute Conen (GER)

14 August 2008
08:30

China	0–1	Netherlands
	Report	Paumen 21'

Umpires:
Chieko Soma (JPN)
Soledad Iparruguirre (ARG)

16 August 2008
10:30

Australia	1–2	Netherlands
Young 17'	Report	Paumen 20', 46'

Umpires:
Sarah Garnett (NZL)
Marelize de Klerk (RSA)

18 August 2008
18:30

Netherlands	2–0	Spain
Paumen 22'; Hoog 69'	Report

Umpires:
Soledad Iparraguirre (ARG)
Minka Woolley (AUS)

Semifinal

20 August 2008
20:30

Netherlands	5–2	Argentina
Paumen 9', 25', 47'; Agliotti 31'; Hoog 68'	Report	Russo 59'; Gulla 69'

Umpires:
Marelize de Klerk (RSA)
Sarah Garnett (NZL)

Gold medal match

22 August 2008
20:30

(silver) China	0–2	Netherlands (gold)
	Report	Van As 51'; Goderie 62'

Umpires:
Soledad Iparraguirre (ARG)
Carolina de la Fuente (ARG)

== Football ==
The qualification criteria for football were the same as the international standards. For male European countries the first four ranked teams at the 2007 European Under-21 Championship would qualify. The Dutch men's team was first in the European under-21 Championship, claiming their second consecutive title and securing their spot in Beijing.

=== Men's tournament ===
Roster

The following is the Netherlands squad in the men's football tournament of the 2008 Summer Olympics.

Head coach: Foppe de Haan

No.	Pos.	Player	Date of birth (age)	Caps	Goals	Club
1	GK	Piet Velthuizen	3 November 1986 (aged 21)	0	0	(Royal Dutch Football Association) Vitesse
2	DF	Gianni Zuiverloon	30 December 1986 (aged 21)	0	0	(The Football Association) West Bromwich Albion
3	DF	Dirk Marcellis	13 April 1988 (aged 20)	0	0	(Royal Dutch Football Association) PSV
4	DF	Kew Jaliens*	15 September 1978 (aged 29)	10	0	(Royal Dutch Football Association) AZ
5	DF	Erik Pieters	7 August 1988 (aged 19)	0	0	(Royal Dutch Football Association) PSV
6	MF	Kees Luyckx	11 February 1986 (aged 22)	0	0	(Royal Dutch Football Association) AZ
7	MF	Jonathan de Guzmán	13 September 1987 (aged 20)	0	0	(Royal Dutch Football Association) Feyenoord
8	MF	Urby Emanuelson	16 June 1986 (aged 22)	11	0	(Royal Dutch Football Association) Ajax
9	FW	Roy Makaay* (c)	9 March 1975 (aged 33)	43	6	(Royal Dutch Football Association) Feyenoord
10	FW	Gerald Sibon*	19 April 1974 (aged 34)	0	0	(Royal Dutch Football Association) Heerenveen
11	FW	Ryan Babel	19 December 1986 (aged 21)	25	5	(The Football Association) Liverpool
12	MF	Hedwiges Maduro	13 February 1985 (aged 23)	12	0	(Royal Spanish Football Federation) Valencia
13	DF	Calvin Jong-a-Pin	18 August 1986 (aged 21)	0	0	(Royal Dutch Football Association) Heerenveen
14	MF	Evander Sno	9 April 1987 (aged 21)	0	0	(Scottish Football Association) Celtic
15	MF	Royston Drenthe	8 April 1987 (aged 21)	0	0	(Royal Spanish Football Federation) Real Madrid
16	FW	Roy Beerens	22 December 1987 (aged 20)	0	0	(Royal Dutch Football Association) Heerenveen
17	MF	Otman Bakkal	27 February 1985 (aged 23)	0	0	(Royal Dutch Football Association) PSV
18	GK	Kenneth Vermeer	10 January 1986 (aged 22)	0	0	(Royal Dutch Football Association) Ajax

* Over-aged player.

Group play

Pos	Team	Pld	W	D	L	GF	GA	GD	Pts	Qualification
1	Nigeria	3	2	1	0	4	2	+2	7	Qualified for the quarterfinals
2	Netherlands	3	1	2	0	3	2	+1	5	Qualified for the quarterfinals
3	United States	3	1	1	1	4	4	0	4	
4	Japan	3	0	0	3	1	4	−3	0	

7 August 2008
19:45

Netherlands	0–0	Nigeria
	Report

Tianjin Olympic Center Stadium, Tianjin
Attendance: 52,390
Referee: Pablo Pozo (Chile)
10 August 2008
19:45

United States	2–2	Netherlands
Kljestan 64'; Altidore 72'	Report	Babel 16'; Sibon 90+3'

Tianjin Olympic Center Stadium, Tianjin
Attendance: 45,016
Referee: Michael Hester (New Zealand)
13 August 2008
17:00

Netherlands	1–0	Japan
Sibon 73' (pen.)	Report

Shenyang Olympic Stadium, Shenyang
Attendance: 38,790
Referee: Héctor Baldassi (Argentina)

Quarterfinals

16 August 2008
21:00

Argentina	2–1 (a.e.t.)	Netherlands
Messi 14'; Di María 105'	Report	Bakkal 36'

Shanghai Stadium, Shanghai
Attendance: 51,366
Referee: Jair Marrufo (United States)

== Gymnastics ==
=== Artistic ===
Men

Athlete	Event	Qualification								Final							
Athlete	Event	Apparatus						Total	Rank	Apparatus						Total	Rank
Athlete	Event	F	PH	R	V	PB	HB	Total	Rank	F	PH	R	V	PB	HB	Total	Rank
Epke Zonderland	Horizontal bar	—N/a					15.750	15.750	4 Q	—N/a					15.000	15.000	7

Women

Athlete	Event	Qualification						Final					
Athlete	Event	Apparatus				Total	Rank	Apparatus				Total	Rank
Athlete	Event	F	V	UB	BB	Total	Rank	F	V	UB	BB	Total	Rank
Suzanne Harmes	All-around	13.825	14.825	13.825	14.600	57.075	32	Did not advance					

== Judo ==
To qualify for the 2008 Summer Olympics Dutch judokas were required to meet both the international (set by the IOC and IJF) and the Dutch criteria (set by the NOC*NSF).

On 26 January 2008, Elisabeth Willeboordse was the first judoka to secure her spot in Beijing. She proved to remain among the world's top ranked judokas by winning her fifth consecutive World Cup in Sofia. Two days later Edith Bosch qualified by reaching the final of the World Cup in Sofia. On 9 February World Champion Ruben Houkes secured his spot by finishing in the top 7 in the Super World Cup in Paris. The next day Mark Huizinga qualified for his fourth consecutive Olympics as he finished in fifth position at the same event in Paris.

Men

Athlete	Event	Preliminary	Round of 32	Round of 16	Quarterfinals	Semifinals	Repechage 1	Repechage 2	Repechage 3	Final / BM	
Athlete	Event	Opposition Result	Opposition Result	Opposition Result	Opposition Result	Opposition Result	Opposition Result	Opposition Result	Opposition Result	Opposition Result	Rank
Ruben Houkes	−60 kg	Bye	Will (CAN); W 0011–0001	Alexanidis (GRE); W 0001–0000	Guédez (VEN); W 0010–0001	Choi (KOR); L 0000–1000	Bye			Yekutiel (ISR); W 1000–0000	3rd place, bronze medalist(s)
Dex Elmont	−66 kg	Bye	Madeira (MOZ); W 1000–0000	Takata (USA); L 0000–0001	Did not advance						
Guillaume Elmont	−81 kg	Bye	Nyamkhüü (MGL); W 0001–0000	Maddaloni (ITA); W 1001–0000	Mrvaljević (MNE); W 0010–0000	Kim J-B (KOR); L 0000–0001	Bye			Camilo (BRA); L 0001–1100	5
Mark Huizinga	−90 kg	—N/a	Iliadis (GRE); W 1010–0001	Aschwanden (SUI); L 0010–1101	Did not advance						
Henk Grol	−100 kg	—N/a	Corrêa (BRA); W 0210–0001	Ze'evi (ISR); W 0010–0001	Matyjaszek (POL); W 1000–0000	Zhitkeyev (KAZ); L 0100–1010	Bye			Zhorzholiani (GEO); W 0020–0000	3rd place, bronze medalist(s)
Dennis van der Geest	+100 kg	Bye	Tmenov (RUS); L 0000–0101	Did not advance							

Women

Athlete	Event	Round of 32	Round of 16	Quarterfinals	Semifinals	Repechage 1	Repechage 2	Repechage 3	Final / BM	
Athlete	Event	Opposition Result	Opposition Result	Opposition Result	Opposition Result	Opposition Result	Opposition Result	Opposition Result	Opposition Result	Rank
Deborah Gravenstijn	−57 kg	Bye	Quadros (BRA); W 0001–0000	Fernández (ESP); W 0001–0000	Xu Y (CHN); W 0100–0010	Bye			Quintavalle (ITA); L 0001–0011	2nd place, silver medalist(s)
Elisabeth Willeboordse	−63 kg	Koval (RUS); W 0012–0010	Saidi (ALG); W 1100–0001	Won O-I (PRK); L 0000–0200	Did not advance	Bye	Krukower (ARG); W 0230–0000	Žolnir (SLO); W 0001–0000	González (CUB); W 0001–0000	3rd place, bronze medalist(s)
Edith Bosch	−70 kg	Nasiga (FIJ); W 1000–0001	Ouerdane (ALG); W 0110–0010	Rousey (USA); W 1000–0000	Ueno (JPN); L 0001–0110	Bye			Iglesias (ESP); W 1001–0000	3rd place, bronze medalist(s)
Carola Uilenhoed	+78 kg	Tserenkhand (MGL); L 0001–0010	Did not advance							

== Rowing ==
Men

Athlete	Event	Heats		Repechage		Quarterfinals		Semifinals		Final	
Athlete	Event	Time	Rank	Time	Rank	Time	Rank	Time	Rank	Time	Rank
Sjoerd Hamburger	Single sculls	7:27.05	2 QF	—N/a		6:57.24	4 SC/D	7:10.06	1 FD	6:58.71	13
Geert Cirkel; Jan-Willem Gabriëls; Matthijs Vellenga; Gijs Vermeulen	Four	6:00.50	1 SA/B	Bye		—N/a		6:02.46	4 FB	6:06.37	8
Paul Drewes; Marshall Godschalk; Ivo Snijders; Gerard van der Linden	Lightweight four	5:57.54	4 R	6:25.25	2 SA/B	—N/a		6:08.73	3 FA	5:54.06	6
Rogier Blink; Jozef Klaassen; Meindert Klem; David Kuiper; Diederik Simon; Olivier Siegelaar*; Mitchel Steenman; Olaf van Andel; Peter Wiersum (cox); Reinder Lubbers*	Eight	5:40.48	3 R	5:42.62	3 FA	—N/a				5:29.26	4

* Lubbers replaced the injured Siegelaar in the repechage.

Women

Athlete	Event	Heats		Repechage		Semifinals		Final	
Athlete	Event	Time	Rank	Time	Rank	Time	Rank	Time	Rank
Marit van Eupen; Kirsten van der Kolk	Lightweight double sculls	6:50.90	1 SA/B	Bye		7:03.87	1 FA	6:54.74	1st place, gold medalist(s)
Femke Dekker; Annemiek de Haan; Nienke Kingma; Roline Repelaer van Driel; Annemarieke van Rumpt; Sarah Siegelaar; Marlies Smulders; Helen Tanger; Ester Workel (cox)	Eight	6:07.41	2 R	6:11.58	2 FA	—N/a		6:07.22	2nd place, silver medalist(s)

Qualification Legend: FA=Final A (medal); FB=Final B (non-medal); FC=Final C (non-medal); FD=Final D (non-medal); FE=Final E (non-medal); FF=Final F (non-medal); SA/B=Semifinals A/B; SC/D=Semifinals C/D; SE/F=Semifinals E/F; QF=Quarterfinals; R=Repechage

== Sailing ==
To qualify for the 2008 Summer Olympics Dutch sailors met both the international (set by the IOC and ISAF) and the Dutch criteria (set by the NOC*NSF).

The first two boats to qualify for the Olympics were the women's 470 of Lobke Berkhout and Marcelien de Koning and the finn of Pieter-Jan Postma. Berkhout and De Koning were 2007 World champions in their class, and secured their spot by finishing sixth in the pre-Olympic tournament in Qingdao on 22 August 2007. Postma, who won silver at the 2007 World Championships in the finn class, also qualified during the pre-Olympic tournament by finishing in second place. Brothers Sven and Kalle Coster qualified in the 470 class after finishing 12th in the 2008 World Championships.

Men

Athlete	Event	Race											Net points	Final rank
Athlete	Event	1	2	3	4	5	6	7	8	9	10	M*	Net points	Final rank
Casper Bouman	RS:X	20	~~27~~	21	22	4	1	1	2	20	21	EL	112	15
Rutger van Schaardenburg	Laser	32	29	~~34~~	32	25	18	30	26	20	CAN	EL	216	37
Kalle Coster; Sven Coster	470	11	~~15~~	12	2	8	15	2	8	4	2	14	78	4

Women

Athlete	Event	Race											Net points	Final rank
Athlete	Event	1	2	3	4	5	6	7	8	9	10	M*	Net points	Final rank
Lobke Berkhout; Marcelien de Koning	470	3	1	9	5	2	2	10	7	4	~~16~~	10	53	2nd place, silver medalist(s)
Annemieke Bes; Mandy Mulder; Merel Witteveen	Yngling	9	1	2	~~13~~	1	5	4	1	CAN	CAN	8	31	2nd place, silver medalist(s)

Open

Athlete	Event	Race											Net points	Final rank
Athlete	Event	1	2	3	4	5	6	7	8	9	10	M*	Net points	Final rank
Pieter-Jan Postma	Finn	19	15	16	~~22~~	15	2	10	16	CAN	CAN	EL	93	14
Mitch Booth; Pim Nieuwenhuis	Tornado	3	~~13~~	8	3	10	2	8	2	11	10	6	64	5

M = Medal race; EL = Eliminated – did not advance into the medal race; CAN = Race cancelled

== Softball ==
The qualification criteria for softball were the same as the international standards. Reaching the semifinals in the 2006 World Championships was an automatic qualification to compete in the Games in Beijing. The Dutch team did not reach the semifinals, and had to enter the African/European qualification tournament to secure their spot.

=== Women's tournament ===
- Women's softball team

– Noemi Boekel
– Marloes Fellinger
– Sandra Gouverneur
– Petra van Heijst
– Judith van Kampen
– Kim Kluijskens
– Saskia Kosterink
– Jolanda Kroesen
– Daisy de Peinder
– Marjan Smit
– Rebecca Soumeru
– Nathalie Timmermans
– Ellen Venker
– Britt Vonk
– Kristi de Vries

== Swimming ==
Dutch swimmers have so far achieved qualifying standards in the following events (up to a maximum of 2 swimmers in each event at the Olympic Qualifying Time (OQT), and 1 at the Olympic Selection Time (OST)).

Men

Athlete	Event	Heat		Semifinal		Final	
Athlete	Event	Time	Rank	Time	Rank	Time	Rank
Nick Driebergen	100 m backstroke	55.31	28	Did not advance			
Nick Driebergen	200 m backstroke	2:00.24	24	Did not advance			
Robert Lijesen	50 m freestyle	22.51	32	Did not advance			
Robin van Aggele	200 m breaststroke	2:17.14	48	Did not advance			
Robin van Aggele	100 m butterfly	52.26	=20	Did not advance			
Robin van Aggele	200 m individual medley	2:04.33	39	Did not advance			
Thijs van Valkengoed	100 m breaststroke	1:01.32	26	Did not advance			
Pieter van den Hoogenband	100 m freestyle	47.97	5 Q	47.68	3 Q	47.75	5
Maarten van der Weijden	10 km open water	—N/a				1:51:51.6	1st place, gold medalist(s)
Mitja Zastrow	100 m freestyle	49.61	38	Did not advance			
Nick Driebergen; Robert Lijesen; Bas van Velthoven; Pieter van den Hoogenband; Mitja Zastrow	4 × 100 m freestyle relay	3:14.90	10	—N/a		Did not advance	

Women

Athlete	Event	Heat		Semifinal		Final	
Athlete	Event	Time	Rank	Time	Rank	Time	Rank
Inge Dekker	100 m freestyle	55.23	24	Did not advance			
Inge Dekker	100 m butterfly	58.22	9 Q	58.20	7 Q	58.54	8
Chantal Groot	100 m butterfly	59.35	=30	Did not advance			
Femke Heemskerk	200 m individual medley	2:16.28	28	Did not advance			
Ranomi Kromowidjojo	200 m freestyle	2:00.02	23	Did not advance			
Hinkelien Schreuder	50 m freestyle	25.00	=12 Q	24.52	6 Q	24.65	7
Edith van Dijk	10 km open water	—N/a				2:00:02.8	14
Jolijn van Valkengoed	100 m breaststroke	1:11.26	35	Did not advance			
Marleen Veldhuis	50 m freestyle	24.38	2 Q	24.46	4 Q	24.26	5
Marleen Veldhuis	100 m freestyle	53.76	3 Q	53.81	2 Q	54.21	=6
Inge Dekker; Femke Heemskerk; Ranomi Kromowidjojo; Hinkelien Schreuder; Manon van Rooijen; Marleen Veldhuis	4 × 100 m freestyle relay	3:37.61	4 Q	—N/a		3:33.76 OR	1st place, gold medalist(s)
Inge Dekker; Femke Heemskerk; Saskia de Jonge; Ranomi Kromowidjojo; Manon van Rooijen	4 × 200 m freestyle relay	7:56.60	11	—N/a		Did not advance	
Inge Dekker; Chantal Groot; Femke Heemskerk; Ranomi Kromowidjojo; Jolijn van Valkengoed	4 × 100 m medley relay	4:04.74	13	—N/a		Did not advance	

== Synchronized swimming ==
Athlete	Event	Technical routine		Free routine (preliminary)			Free routine (final)		
Athlete	Event	Points	Rank	Points	Total (technical + free)	Rank	Points	Total (technical + free)	Rank
Bianca van der Velden; Sonja van der Velden	Duet	45.584	10	45.834	91.418	9 Q	46.083	91.667	9

== Table tennis ==
To qualify for the 2008 Summer Olympics Dutch table tennis players needed to meet both the international (set by the IOC and ITTF) and the Dutch criteria (set by the NOC*NSF). Li Jiao qualified herself in January 2008 when she was selected by the ITTF as one of the top 20 players in the World.

Singles

Athlete	Event	Preliminary round	Round 1	Round 2	Round 3	Round 4	Quarterfinals	Semifinals	Final / BM	
Athlete	Event	Opposition Result	Opposition Result	Opposition Result	Opposition Result	Opposition Result	Opposition Result	Opposition Result	Opposition Result	Rank
Li Jiao	Women's singles	Bye			Ni Xl (LUX); W 4–1	Guo Y (CHN); L 0–4	Did not advance			
Li Jie	Women's singles	Bye		Zhu F (ESP); W 4–1	Liu J (AUT); W 4–1	Feng Tw (SIN); L 1–4	Did not advance			

Team

Athlete	Event	Group round		Semifinals	Bronze playoff 1	Bronze playoff 2	Bronze medal	Final	
Athlete	Event	Opposition Result	Rank	Opposition Result	Opposition Result	Opposition Result	Opposition Result	Opposition Result	Rank
Li Jiao; Li Jie; Elena Timina	Women's team	Group B Singapore; L 0 – 3 United States; L 1 – 3 Nigeria; W 3 – 0	3	Did not advance					

== Taekwondo ==
To qualify for the 2008 Summer Olympics Dutch taekwondo practitioners needed to meet both the international (set by the IOC and WTF) and the Dutch criteria (set by the NOC*NSF). Dennis Bekkers finished third in the qualification tournament in Istanbul, thus qualifying to compete at the Olympics in Beijing.

Athlete	Event	Round of 16	Quarterfinals	Semifinals	Repechage	Bronze Medal	Final	
Athlete	Event	Opposition Result	Opposition Result	Opposition Result	Opposition Result	Opposition Result	Opposition Result	Rank
Dennis Bekkers	Men's −68 kg	Son T-J (KOR); L 3–4	Did not advance		Tazegül (TUR); L 2–3	Did not advance		

== Triathlon ==
Athlete	Event	Swim (1.5 km)	Trans 1	Bike (40 km)	Trans 2	Run (10 km)	Total Time	Rank
Sander Berk	Men's	18:13	0:28	59:06	0:34	33:57	1:52:18.09	31
Lisa Mensink	Women's	20:03	0:28	1:07:44	0:33	41:30	2:10:18.98	45

== Volleyball ==
=== Beach volleyball ===
Athlete	Event	Preliminary round	Standing	Round of 16	Quarterfinals	Semifinals	Final / BM	
Athlete	Event	Opposition Score	Standing	Opposition Score	Opposition Score	Opposition Score	Opposition Score	Rank
Emiel Boersma; Bram Ronnes	Men's	Pool F Gibb – Rosenthal (USA); L 0 – 2 (16–21, 15–21); Asahi – Shiratori (JPN); L 0 – 2 (15–21, 25–23, 11–15); Brink – Dieckmann (GER); W 2 – 0 (21–16, 21–19); Lucky Losers; Klemperer – Koreng (GER); L 0 – 2 (16–21, 25–27)	3	Did not advance				
Reinder Nummerdor; Richard Schuil	Men's	Pool E Laciga – Schnider (SUI); W 2 – 0 (21–14, 21–15); Kjemperud – Skarlund (NOR); W 2 – 1 (13–21, 21–15, 15–9); Klemperer – Koreng (GER); W 2 – 0 (21–16, 21–16)	1 Q	Schacht – Slack (AUS); W 2 – 0 (21–16, 21–14)	Geor – Gia (GEO); L 0 – 2 (19–21, 19–21)	Did not advance		
Rebekka Kadijk; Merel Mooren	Women's	Pool E Branagh – Youngs (USA); L 0 – 2 (19–21, 25–27); Crespo – Esteves (CUB); L 0 – 2 (11–21, 15–21); Pohl – Rau (GER); L 0 – 2 (19–21, 18–21)	4	Did not advance				

== Water polo ==
The Netherlands participated in the women's tournament, where the team won the gold medal.

=== Women's tournament ===
The qualification criteria for water polo were the same as the international standards. The Dutch women's team became first at the European qualification tournament in Kirishi by beating the host nation Russia in the final.

Roster

The following is the Dutch roster in the women's water polo tournament of the 2008 Summer Olympics.

№	Name	Pos.	Height	Weight	Date of birth	Club
1	Ilse van der Meijden	GK	1.85 m (6 ft 1 in)	71 kg (157 lb)	22 October 1988	(Netherlands) Brandenburg Bilthoven
2	Yasemin Smit	CB	1.78 m (5 ft 10 in)	70 kg (150 lb)	21 November 1984	(Netherlands) Het Ravijn Nijverdal
3	Mieke Cabout	D	1.82 m (6 ft 0 in)	70 kg (150 lb)	30 March 1986	(Netherlands) ZVL Leiden
4	Biurakn Hakhverdian	D	1.72 m (5 ft 8 in)	65 kg (143 lb)	4 October 1985	(Netherlands) Polar Bears
5	Marieke van den Ham	D	1.69 m (5 ft 7 in)	80 kg (180 lb)	21 January 1983	(Netherlands) Polar Bears
6	Daniëlle de Bruijn	D	1.72 m (5 ft 8 in)	68 kg (150 lb)	13 February 1978	(Netherlands) Widex GZC Donk Gouda
7	Iefke van Belkum	CF	1.85 m (6 ft 1 in)	75 kg (165 lb)	22 July 1986	(Netherlands) ZVL Leiden
8	Noeki Klein	CF	1.79 m (5 ft 10 in)	80 kg (180 lb)	28 April 1983	(Netherlands) ZVL Leiden
9	Gillian van den Berg	D	1.73 m (5 ft 8 in)	66 kg (146 lb)	8 September 1971	(Netherlands) De Gouwe Waddinxveen
10	Alette Sijbring	CB	1.74 m (5 ft 9 in)	68 kg (150 lb)	20 March 1982	(Netherlands) TWZ Zaandam
11	Rianne Guichelaar	D	1.74 m (5 ft 9 in)	63 kg (139 lb)	16 August 1983	(Netherlands) Het Ravijn Nijverdal
12	Simone Koot	D	1.73 m (5 ft 8 in)	65 kg (143 lb)	12 November 1980	(Netherlands) Brandenburg Bilthoven
13	Meike de Nooy	GK	1.85 m (6 ft 1 in)	73 kg (161 lb)	2 May 1983	(Netherlands) Het Ravijn Nijverdal

Head coach: Robin van Galen

Group play

Team	Pld	W	D	L	GF	GA	GD	Pts	Qualification
Hungary	3	2	1	0	28	20	+8	5	Qualified for semifinals
Australia	3	2	1	0	25	22	+3	5	Qualified for quarterfinals
Netherlands	3	1	0	2	27	27	0	2	Qualified for quarterfinals
Greece	3	0	0	3	16	27	−11	0	Will play for places 7th–8th

All times are China Standard Time (UTC+8).

11 August 2008; 13:00	Report	Hungary	11–9	Netherlands	Ying Tung Natatorium, Beijing; Referees: Massimiliano Caputi (ITA), Radoslaw Piotr Koryzna (POL)
11 August 2008; 13:00	Report	Score by quarters: 3–3, 3–2, 4–3, 1–1			Ying Tung Natatorium, Beijing; Referees: Massimiliano Caputi (ITA), Radoslaw Piotr Koryzna (POL)
11 August 2008; 13:00	Report	Pelle 4, Kisteleki 2, Stieber 2, Valkai 2	Goals	de Bruijn 4, van den Berg 3	Ying Tung Natatorium, Beijing; Referees: Massimiliano Caputi (ITA), Radoslaw Piotr Koryzna (POL)

13 August 2008; 14:20	Report	Greece	6–9	Netherlands	Ying Tung Natatorium, Beijing; Referees: Shiwei Ni (CHN), Decio Jr Patelli (BRA)
13 August 2008; 14:20	Report	Score by quarters: 3–3, 2–2, 1–3, 0–1			Ying Tung Natatorium, Beijing; Referees: Shiwei Ni (CHN), Decio Jr Patelli (BRA)
13 August 2008; 14:20	Report	Liosi 2	Goals	Cabout 4, de Bruijn 2, van Belkum 2	Ying Tung Natatorium, Beijing; Referees: Shiwei Ni (CHN), Decio Jr Patelli (BRA)

15 August 2008; 13:00	Report	Netherlands	9–10	Australia	Ying Tung Natatorium, Beijing; Referees: Massimiliano Caputi (ITA), Gaetan Turcotte (CAN)
15 August 2008; 13:00	Report	Score by quarters: 1–2, 2–2, 1–2, 5–4			Ying Tung Natatorium, Beijing; Referees: Massimiliano Caputi (ITA), Gaetan Turcotte (CAN)
15 August 2008; 13:00	Report	van den Ham 3, van Belkum 2, Sijbring 2	Goals	B. Knox 4, Beadsworth 2, Gynther 2	Ying Tung Natatorium, Beijing; Referees: Massimiliano Caputi (ITA), Gaetan Turcotte (CAN)

Quarterfinal

17 August 2008; 15:40	Report	Italy	11–13 (OT, PSO)	Netherlands	Ying Tung Natatorium, Beijing; Referees: Torsten Bock (GER), Nikolaos Argyros (GRE)
17 August 2008; 15:40	Report	Score by quarters: 2–2, 1–3, 3–2, 2–1 OT: 0–0, 0–0 PSO: 3–5			Ying Tung Natatorium, Beijing; Referees: Torsten Bock (GER), Nikolaos Argyros (GRE)
17 August 2008; 15:40	Report	Zanchi 4, Miceli 2, Bosurgi 2	Goals	Cabout 4, de Bruijn 3, Smit 2, van Belkum 2	Ying Tung Natatorium, Beijing; Referees: Torsten Bock (GER), Nikolaos Argyros (GRE)

Semifinal

19 August 2008; 15:40	Report	Hungary	7–8	Netherlands	Ying Tung Natatorium, Beijing; Referees: Mario Brguljan (MNE), Sergey Antsiferov (RUS)
19 August 2008; 15:40	Report	Score by quarters: 2–1, 1–3, 3–3, 1–1			Ying Tung Natatorium, Beijing; Referees: Mario Brguljan (MNE), Sergey Antsiferov (RUS)
19 August 2008; 15:40	Report	Pelle 3 Drávucz, Primász 2	Goals	van den Ham, van Belkum 3 Cabout, Sijbring 1	Ying Tung Natatorium, Beijing; Referees: Mario Brguljan (MNE), Sergey Antsiferov (RUS)

Final

21 August 2008; 18:20	Report	(silver) United States	8–9	Netherlands (gold)	Ying Tung Natatorium, Beijing; Referees: Gabor Kiszelly (HUN), Massimiliano Caputi (ITA)
21 August 2008; 18:20	Report	Score by quarters: 2–4, 3–1, 1–2, 2–2			Ying Tung Natatorium, Beijing; Referees: Gabor Kiszelly (HUN), Massimiliano Caputi (ITA)
21 August 2008; 18:20	Report	Steffens 2 Hayes, Villa, Golda, Gregorka, van Norman, Craig 1	Goals	de Bruijn 7 van Belkum, van den Ham 1	Ying Tung Natatorium, Beijing; Referees: Gabor Kiszelly (HUN), Massimiliano Caputi (ITA)

== See also ==
- Netherlands at the 2008 Summer Paralympics
