= Paul Drewes =

Dutch rower (born 1982)

Paul Drewes (born 2 April 1982 in Ten Boer) is a rower from the Netherlands.

Drewes rows in the lightweight fours and lightweight double sculls and debuted in the Rowing World Cup circuit May 2005 in Eton in the lightweight fours where he finished in fourth position together with his teammates Wim Bakker, Jacob Haartsen and Samuel Alberga. His lightweight double sculls debut followed in July 2005 with a fifth position together with Karel Dormans in Luzern. At the World Championships in Gifu he and Wolter Blankert reached the ninth position. 2006 was focused on the lightweight fours again and at the World Cup meeting in Munich Drewes, Arnoud Greidanus, Blankert and Tom van den Broek became third. An additional fifth place in Luzern gave them some hope for the World Championships in Eton, but in the end they only finished in an eleventh position there.

In 2007 he started in the lightweight double sculls again, this time with Roeland Lievens and a second place in the World Cup meeting in Linz was the result. The next two World Cups in Amsterdam and Luzern however he would row in the lightweight fours again. With Alwin Snijders, Greidanus and Lievens he became third in Amsterdam. With Gerard van der Linden instead of Greidanus they also became third in Luzern. This was also the team selection for the World Championships in Munich but they only became tenth this time.

For the 2008 season he rowed another two World Cups in the lightweight double sculls with Roeland Lievens. In Munich they became third and in Luzern second. With Marshall Godschalk, Gerard van der Linden and Ivo Snijders he took part in the lightweight fours again in the next World Cup in Poznań. Their fifth position there was enough to qualify for the 2008 Summer Olympics in Beijing.
