= Ivo Snijders =

Ivo Snijders (born 9 September 1980 in Mijdrecht) is a rower from the Netherlands.

Snijders started rowing in 1995 and made his international senior debut in the lightweight fours at the 2000 World Championships in Zagreb. Together with Gerard van der Linden, Dylan van der Linde and Coen Eggenkamp he finished on the 9th position. Without Van der Linden, but with Tristan Kramers they improved their result to a fifth position in the 2001 Rowing World Cup meeting in Munich. The quartet finished in 7th position at the World Championships in Luzern after winning the B-final. In 2002 Snijders totally focused on the lightweight double sculls together with Gerard van der Linden. They became ninth and seventh in the World Cup meetings in Hazewinkel and Luzern before winning the silver medal at the Under-23 World Championships. At the senior World Championships in Sevilla they became 10th.

Snijders, Van der Linden, Karel Dormans as well as Joeri de Groot started a new adventure in the lightweight coxless fours in 2003, finishing second in the Munich World Cup and fourth in Luzern. These pre tournament results earned them a place for the World Championships in Milan where they won the silver medal. Their next aim was to qualify for the 2004 Summer Olympics and with a seventh place in Poznań, a fourth in Munich and a fifth in Luzern they succeeded and they could pack their bags for Athens. They aimed for a medal at the Olympics, but came just short and had to be satisfied with a fourth place.

Snijders decided to stop with rowing, but made a comeback in 2007 when he entered a lightweight fours boat with Wolter Blankert, Arnoud Greidanus and Gerard van der Linden in Linz where they finished in fourth position. With Roeland Lievens and Paul1 Drewes as replacements of Blankert and Greidanus they improved their result to a third place in Luzern and they created some high expectations for the World Championships in Munich. They could not keep up with the expectations and only finished in a tenth position in Germany.

For the 2008 season he rowed with Greidanus, Van der Linden and Marshall Godschalk to an eight place at the World Cup in Munich. After they finished ninth in Luzern Greidanus was replaced by Paul Drewes and in Poznań they rowed to a fifth place, which meant qualification for the 2008 Summer Olympics in Beijing.
