= Gerard van der Linden =

Dutch rower (born 1981)

Gerard van der Linden (born 29 December 1981 in Rotterdam) is a rower from the Netherlands.

Van der Linden started rowing in 1992 and made his international senior debut in the lightweight fours at the 2000 World Championships in Zagreb. Together with Ivo Snijders, Dylan van der Linde and Coen Eggenkamp he finished on the 9th position. With Karel Dormans, Jeroen Spaans and Joeri de Groot he finished third at the 2001 Rowing World Cup meeting in Seville, a fifth place in Munich and sixth at the World Championships in Luzern In 2002 Van der Linden totally focused on the lightweight double sculls together with Ivo Snijders. They became ninth and seventh in the World Cup meetings in Hazewinkel and Luzern before winning the silver medal at the Under-23 World Championships. At the senior World Championships in Seville they became 10th.

Van der Linden, Snijders, Karel Dormans as well as Joeri de Groot started a new adventure in the lightweight double sculls in 2003, finishing second in the Munich World Cup and fourth in Luzern. These pre-tournament results earned them a place for the World Championships in Milan where they won the silver medal. Their next aim was to qualify for the 2004 Summer Olympics and with a seventh place in Poznań, a fourth in Munich and a fifth in Luzern they succeeded and could pack their bags for Athens. They aimed for a medal at the Olympics but came just short and had to be satisfied with a fourth place.

He then decided to row in the lightweight single scull in 2005, finishing fifth in Eton, third in Munich and sixth in Luzern, before becoming fifth at the World Championships in Gifu. His 2006 results were almost equal with a fourth place in Munich, a fifth in Luzern and a sixth at the World Championships in Eton. In 2007 he made his comeback in the lightweight fours boat with Wolter Blankert, Arnoud Greidanus and Ivo Snijders in Linz where they finished in fourth position. With Roeland Lievens and Paul Drewes as replacements of Blankert and Greidanus they improved their result to a third place in Luzern and they created some high expectations for the World Championships in Munich. They could not keep up with the expectations and only finished in a tenth position in Germany.

For the 2008 season he rowed with Greidanus, Snijders, and Marshall Godschalk to an eight place at the World Cup in Munich. After they finished ninth in Luzern, Greidanus was replaced by Paul Drewes, and in Poznań they rowed to a fifth place, which meant qualification for the 2008 Summer Olympics in Beijing.
