= Marshall Godschalk =

Dutch rower (born 1984)

Marshall Godschalk (born 28 February 1984 in Willemstad, Curaçao) is a rower from the Netherlands.

Godschalk started rowing in 2000 and made his international debut at the 2005 Under-23 World Championships in Amsterdam with a fifth place in the lightweight fours together with Pieter Rom Colthoff, Wim Bakker and Samuel Alberga. In 2006 he was part of the Dutch lightweight eights with Roeland Lievens, Marten Bosma, Jaap Schouten, Kaspar van den Brink, Peter Kooren, Matthijs van Gool, Samuel Alberga and cox Michiel Maas. They finished at a fourth position at the Luzern Rowing World Cup and rowed to the sixth position at the World Championships in Eton, where Van Gool was replaced by Gerard Harenberg. Without any success he tried to row some World Cups in the lightweight fours again in 2007, but was selected again for the lightweight eights team for the World Championships. The team further existing of Tom van den Broek, Pieter Bottema, Wolter Blankert, Dennis Beemsterboer, Maarten Tromp, Arnoud Greidanus, Alwin Snijders and cox Peter Wiersum became World Champion in Munich.

For the 2008 season he rowed with Greidanus, Snijders and Gerard van der Linden to an eight place at the World Cup in Munich. After they finished ninth in Luzern, Greidanus was replaced by Paul Drewes and in Poznań they rowed to a fifth place, which meant qualification for the 2008 Summer Olympics in Beijing. At the 2008 Summer Olympics, they participated in the Men's Lightweight Coxless Four and qualified for the Final A, where they finished 6th.
