= Telkamp =

Telkamp is a surname. Notable people with the surname include:

- Eberhard Telkamp (1914–1992), German military personnel
- Mieke Telkamp (1934–2016), Dutch singer
