= Meeuwis =

Meeuwis is a Dutch patronymic surname, originally meaning "son of Meeuw/Mewis", short forms of Bartholomeus/Bartholomew. Notable people with the surname include:

- Guus Meeuwis (born 1972), Dutch singer-songwriter
- Marcel Meeuwis (born 1980), Dutch footballer
- Martijn Meeuwis (born 1982), Dutch baseball player

== See also ==
- Meeuw
