= Sam Burns (disambiguation) =

Sam Burns (born 1996) is an American golfer.

Sam Burns may also refer to:

- Sam Burns (footballer) (born 2002), English footballer

== See also ==
- Samuel Burns (born 1982), American rower
- Sam Berns (1996–2014), American activist
