= Oldenzaal =

- Municipality
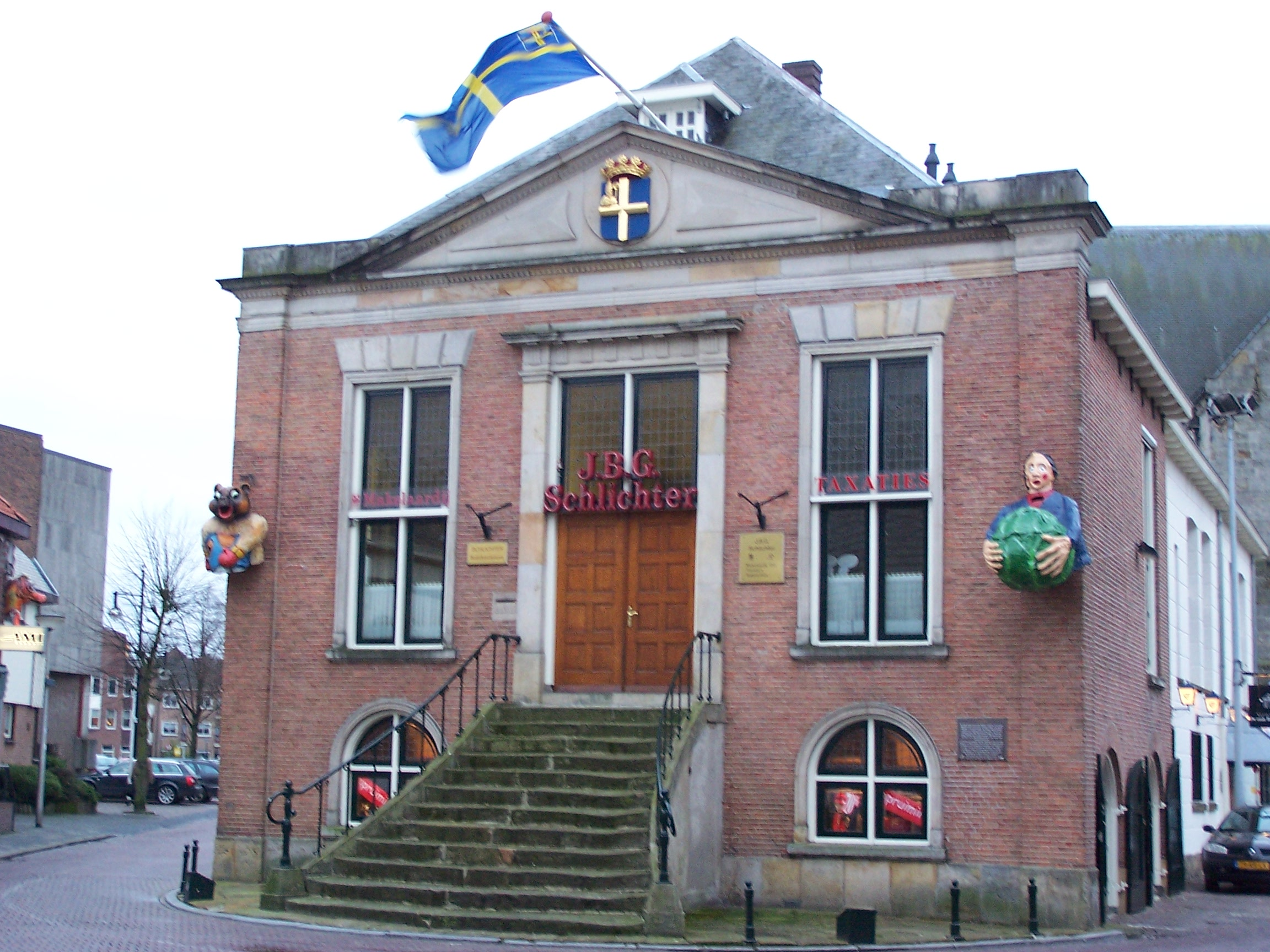
- Former city hall of Oldenzaal

- Flag Coat of arms

- Location in Overijssel
- Coordinates: 52°19′N 6°56′E
- Country: Netherlands
- Province: Overijssel

Government
  - Body: Municipal council
  - Mayor: Patrick Welman (CDA)

Area
  - Total: 21.95 km^{2} (8.47 sq mi)
  - Land: 21.55 km^{2} (8.32 sq mi)
  - Water: 0.40 km^{2} (0.15 sq mi)
- Elevation: 48 m (157 ft)

Population (January 2021)
  - Total: 31,701
  - Density: 1,471/km^{2} (3,810/sq mi)
- Demonym(s): Oldenzaler, Boeskool
- Time zone: UTC+1 (CET)
  - Summer (DST): UTC+2 (CEST)
- Postcode: 7570–7579
- Area code: 0541
- Website: www.oldenzaal.nl

Oldenzaal (Dutch pronunciation: [ˈɔldə(n)ˌzaːl]; Tweants: Oldnzel) is a municipality and a city in the eastern province of Overijssel in the Netherlands. It is part of the region of Twente and is close to the German border.

It received city rights in 1249. Historically, the city was part of the Hanseatic League as a subsidiary city of the fellow Hanseatic city of Deventer.

Located on the A1 motorway from Amsterdam to Germany, Oldenzaal also has a rail connection to Hengelo and Bad Bentheim.

As of December 2022 Oldenzaal has a population of 31,958 people.

In the Netherlands, Oldenzaal is well known for its carnival festivities. During the carnival season Oldenzaal is known as "Boeskool-stad" which is a local dialect of the word Cabbage-town. During the main carnival weekend over 100,000 people come for the big parade showing high and mighty carnival trucks.

== Transportation ==
The town is served by the Oldenzaal railway station.

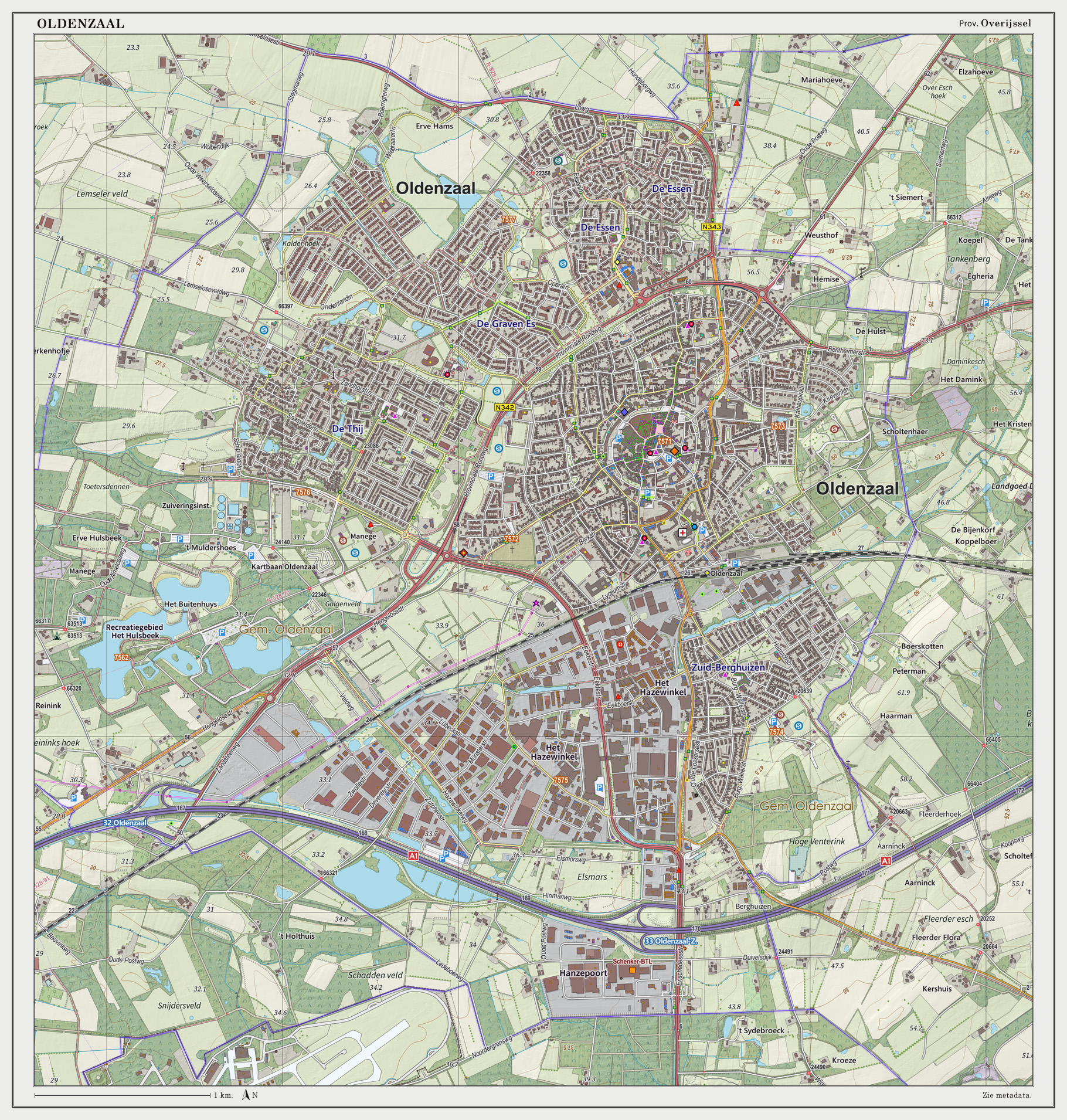
Map of Oldenzaal (town), as of June 2014

== Notable residents ==
- Balderic of Utrecht (897–975) Bishop of Utrecht, 918 to 975
- Henri Max Corwin (1903–1962) a businessman, philatelist and humanitarian; shielded Jewish victims of the Nazis in WWII
- Mieke Telkamp (1934–2016) a singer and TV personality
- Zoraya Ter Beek (1995-2024) autistic advocate for euthanasia and disability rights.

=== Sport ===
- Theo Pahlplatz (1947–2023) a footballer; 468 caps with FC Twente
- Wilfried Brookhuis (born 1961) a football goalkeeper with 404 club caps
- Raimond van der Gouw (born 1963) a former football goalkeeper with 493 club caps
- Ellen van Langen (born 1966) a Dutch former middle-distance runner, gold medallist in the 800 m. at the 1992 Summer Olympics
- Rudie Kemna (born 1967) a former racing cyclist
- Björn Kuipers (born 1973) a Dutch FIFA listed football referee
- Jan Vennegoor of Hesselink (born 1978) a former footballer with 438 club caps
- Tim Breukers (born 1987) a professional footballer with over 250 club caps
- Wout Droste (born 1989) a professional footballer with over 250 club caps
- Nathalie Timmermans (born 1989) a Dutch softball player, competed in the 2008 Summer Olympics
- Jules Reimerink (born 1989) a professional footballer with over 250 club caps
- Alexander Bannink (born 1990) a professional footballer with over 220 club caps
- Sanne Wevers (born 1991) a Dutch artistic gymnast, gold medallist at the 2016 Summer Olympics
- Lieke Wevers (born 1991) a Dutch artistic gymnast, won four medals at the 2015 European Games
- Jill Roord (born 1997) a Dutch midfield footballer
- Erik ten Hag (born 1970) former footballer with 336 club caps and coach. Former head coach of Manchester United and AFC Ajax

== Gallery ==
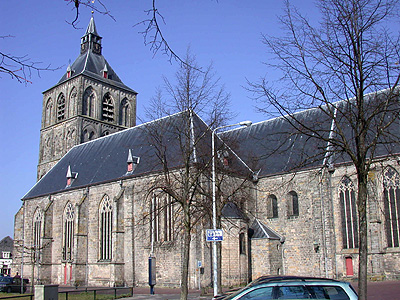
The Basilica of St Plechelm

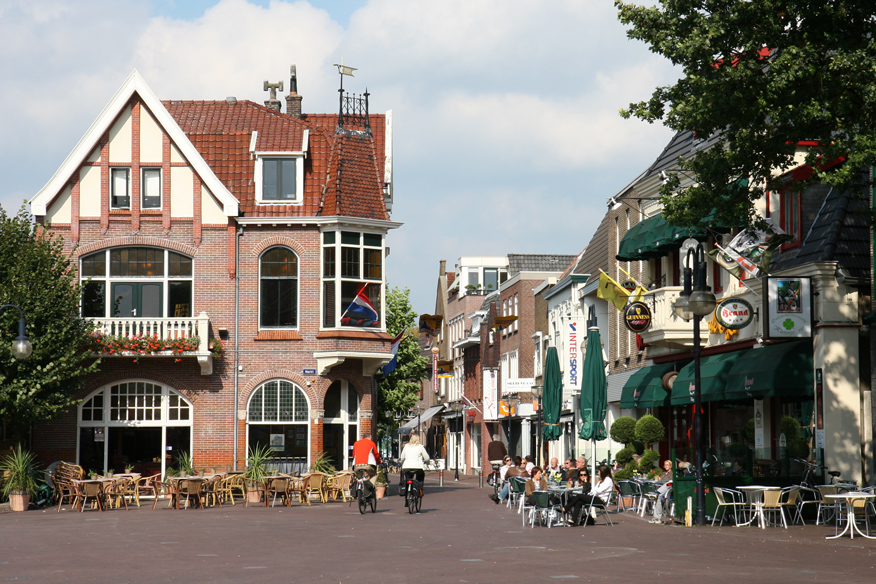
Marktplein (market square)

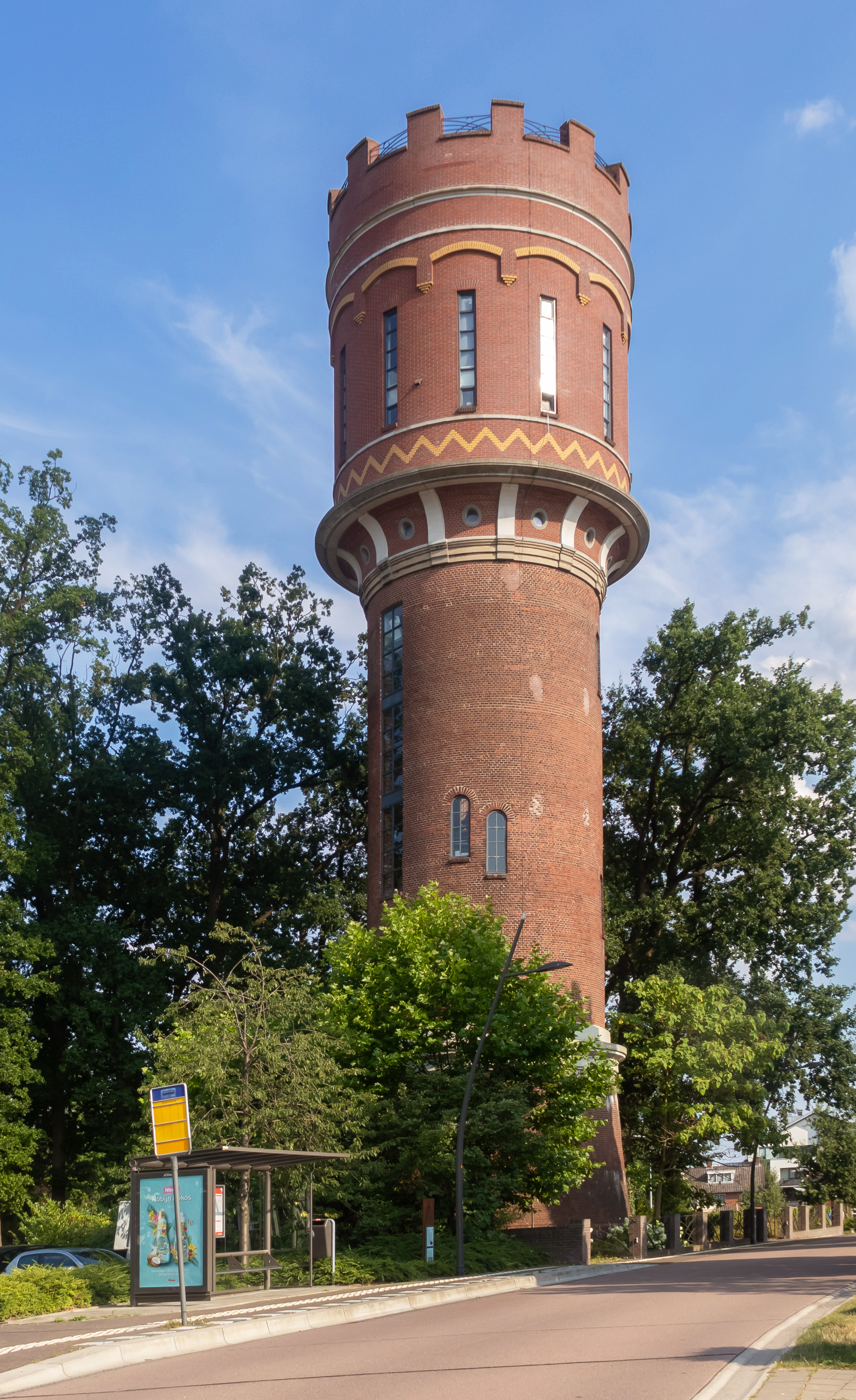
Watertower

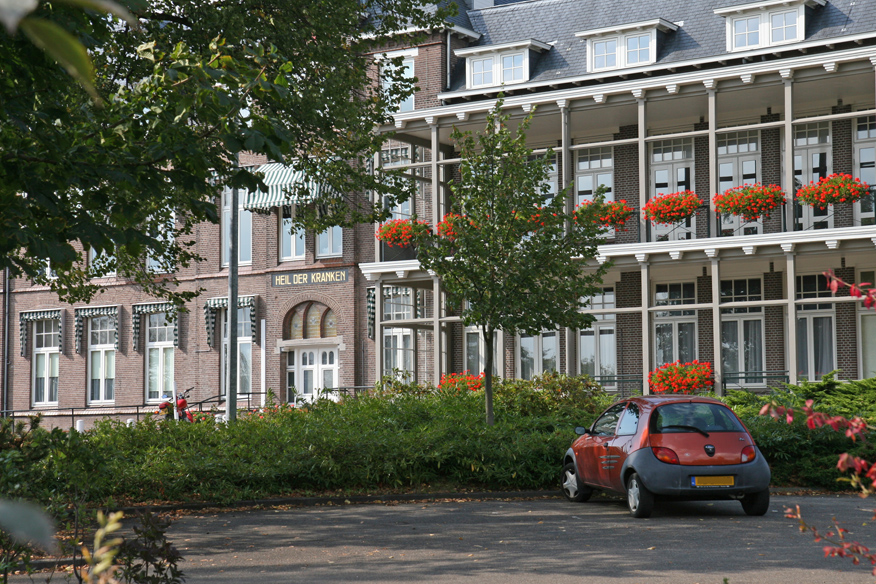
Ziekenhuis (hospital), Oldenzaal
