= Henri Max Corwin =

Dutch businessman, philatelist, and humanitarian (1903–1962)

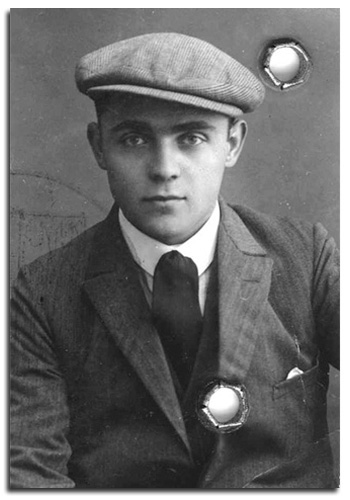
Corwin in his twenties

Henri Max Corwin (1903 in Oldenzaal, Overijssel – January 1962) was a Dutch businessman, philatelist and humanitarian. He became famous both for his efforts to shield Jewish victims of Nazi persecution during World War II, and later for his efforts to document instruments of propaganda utilized during national conflict.

== Biography ==
Henri Max Cohen was born in 1903, the youngest of four children, in the eastern Netherlands village of Oldenzaal, where his family had lived since at least 1770. After completing secondary schooling Cohen entered the study of Law at Leiden University, but soon had to return to Oldenzaal to run the family business when his father suffered health problems.

As a youth Cohen had two abiding pastimes, stamp collecting and the theater. He wrote plays, directed plays and acted in plays.

When the persecution of Jewish people in Germany became apparent in the years before the outbreak of World War II, he began escorting people from that nation to safe havens in the Netherlands. He was often assisted in these trips by his fiancée Geraldine.

Soon after the start of the war, his nation was invaded and occupied by German troops. At that time, he became active in providing hiding places for people who would otherwise be arrested and deported under the German antisemitism policies. For this effort, he was arrested on 16 October 1943 by two Dutch members of the Sicherheitsdienst, on the charge of providing "safe houses". He was sentenced to imprisonment at Assen, but while being transported there, he managed to jump from the train and escape. He remained in hiding until the end of the war, after which he returned to Oldenzaal and resumed managing his family's affairs.

During the Cold War fears of the 1950s, he noted a renewed antisemitism in Europe. He saw many of the Dutch Jews moving to safe areas (usually America), and considered moving his family away also. In the end, he decided to remain in the Netherlands, but changed his name (and thus the family's name) from Cohen to Corwin, hoping that this would buy them a margin of safety if anti-Jewish persecution did resume. Corwin died in January 1962 at the age of 58. A street in Oldenzaal was named in his honor.

== Humanitarian efforts ==
In the 1930s when the situation for the Jews in Germany became unbearable, he acted as a courier for the Jewish Refugee Committee in Amsterdam, taking refugees or their belongings across the Dutch border. For this he was granted membership in the U.N.A.P.E.F. (Union Nationale des Passeurs & Filieristes Benevoles). A letter from Albert Einstein confirms these activities (a copy is shown on the site). When in 1940 the Germans occupied the Netherlands and began arresting Jewish citizens, Cohen organized (in cooperation with the Resistance) hiding places for family and friends. This illegal activity led to his arrest by the SD (the Sicherheits Dienst) in 1943. On the way to prison he managed to escape and went into hiding himself until the end of the war.

In the early fifties, when Russian politics threatened European peace, many Dutch Jews fled the country. Mr. Cohen thought best to protect his family by changing his name in Corwin, a name several of his family living in the States already had adopted.

== Genealogy efforts ==
In his later years Corwin became an enthusiastic historian and genealogist. He tracked down family trees of Jewish families and gave lectures on the ups and downs of the Jewish population in the Twente region. The results of this research can be found in the Central Institute for Genealogy in The Hague, in the Rosentaliana Library and the Jewish Historical Museum in Amsterdam, in periodicals, newspapers and the Yearbook Twente 1962. In 1960 he received the Order of Oranje Nassau.

Corwin died of heart failure at the age of 58 in January 1962. In Oldenzaal a street is named after him.

Detailed information with regard to the collection of H.M. Corwin and his interesting life, including his war diary, photo albums, press articles and more can be found on the personal site, created by his daughters in 2008. A book about his life will appear in 2009.

== Collection of documents ==
Corwin assembled a unique collection of documents regarding the Second World War and the Holocaust. Most of the collected items can be categorized under the title of "propaganda". This war collection contains 24 albums on various aspects of the period from approximately 1900 until 1945, including the rise of nationalism, the 1936 Olympic Games, Nazi occupation of various countries, anti-Semitic measures and the massacre of the Jews. The collection was exhibited in 1959/1964 in the Netherlands and in Israel at the Yad Vashem and at the Kibbutz Lohamei Hagethaot.

=== The Color of Propaganda ===
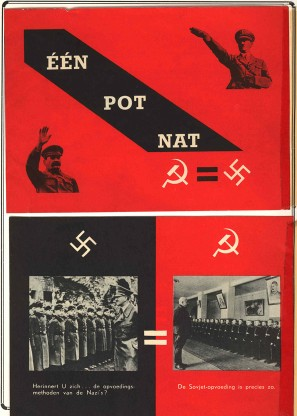

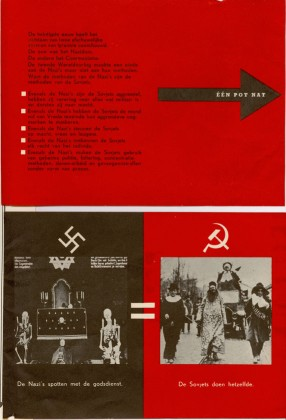

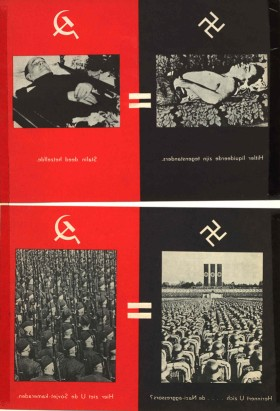

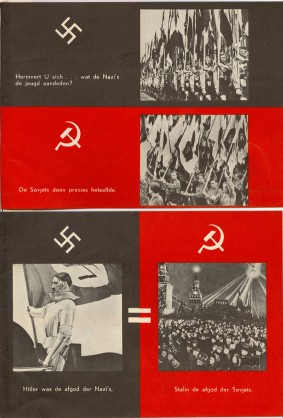

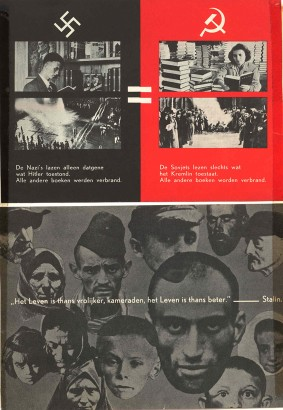

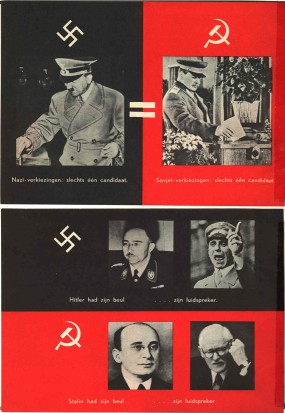
