= Meeuw =

Meeuw is a surname. Notable people with the surname include:

- Folkert Meeuw (born 1946), German swimmer, husband of Jutta and father of Helge
- Helge Meeuw (born 1984), German swimmer
- Jutta Meeuw (born 1954), German swimmer

== See also ==
- Meeuws
- Meeuwis
