= Mieke Telkamp =

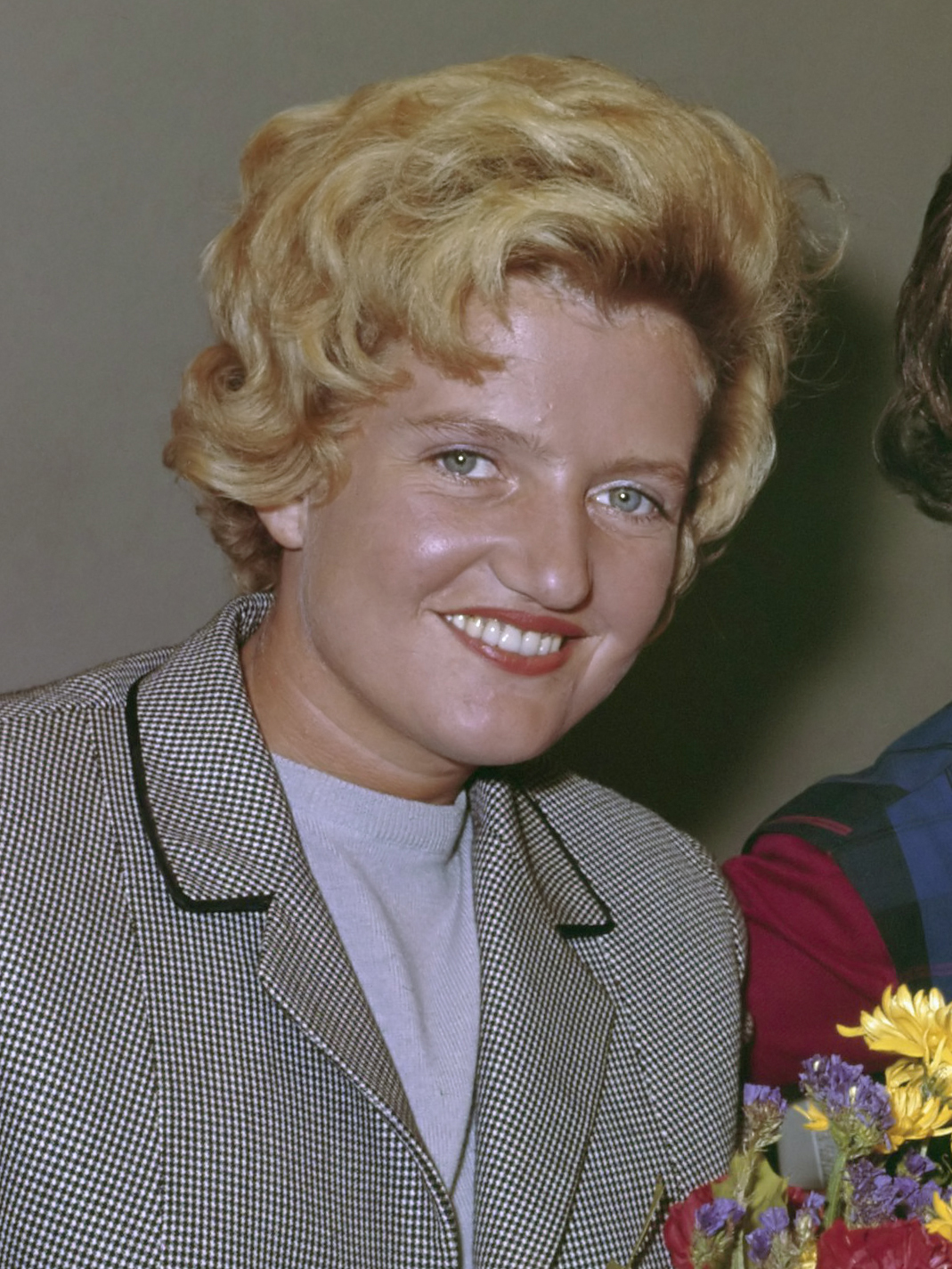
- Telkamp in 1962

Background information
- Birth name: Maria Berendina Johanna Telgenkamp
- Born: 14 June 1934; Oldenzaal, Netherlands
- Died: 20 October 2016 (aged 82); Zeist
- Occupation: Singer

Mieke Telkamp (Dutch pronunciation: [ˈmikə ˈtɛlkɑmp]; 14 June 1934 – 20 October 2016) was a Dutch singer. Her career spanned over 50 years, both as a singer and a TV personality. Telkamp's most popular song was the 1971 Dutch version of Amazing Grace, which sold over 1 million copies.

== Career ==
Telkamp had several hits between 1953 and 1967. She became famous in 1953 with a cover of "Here in My Heart", a song made popular in 1952 by Al Martino. She then had success with the songs "Never on Sunday" and "Changing of the tides". She also had a lot of success in West Germany, the biggest hit being "Prego, prego gondeliere", which sold nearly one million copies. She used the name Mieke Telkamp because her surname Telgenkamp was thought to be too difficult for the West German market.

She won first prize, the 'Golden Gondola' at the Venice Festival in 1957. In 1962 she participated in Eurovision Knokke and in 1964 performed in the 'Snip en Snap' Revue.

In 1967, at her doctor's advice, she retired from show business due to abdominal complaints, but in the early 1970s she decided to revive her career. However, she only performed in record, radio and television studios, instead of live.

After Telkamp's return to music, she achieved the biggest success of her career. in 1971 she received her first gold record for "Waarheen, waarvoor" (Where to, what for), a song with original Dutch lyrics by Charles Hille, written to the melody of "Amazing Grace", which sold over a million copies in the Netherlands. Together with De Hi-Five she recorded "Waarheen, waarvoor", conducted by Harry de Groot and arranged by Frank Jansen, who also produced it. For many years it was the most popular song at funerals in the Netherlands.

Almost a million copies were sold of "Tulpen aus Amsterdam", a CD with all her German successes. Telkamp was the first Dutch singer who began to sing in German again after the Second World War, which was appreciated in German-speaking countries. Since 1955 many records were released in West Germany, of which "Du bist mein erster Gedanke" was the first. Her first German title "Morgen komm' ich wieder" was released only in the Netherlands in 1953 and became a great success.

In 1978, Telkamp was the first person in show business to be knighted in the Royal Order of Oranje Nassau. Her final performance took place in 1990.

In August 2008 a DVD was released titled "Alles voor jou" with visual content of 40 songs from the period 1959-1989.

On December 13, 2008 Telkom received a Diamond Award from Omroep MAX for the sale of 1 million copies of "Waarheen, waarvoor".

Telkamp made her final public appearance at Omroep MAX on March 10, 2011. Since then she lived in seclusion in Zeist. She died in 2016 at the age of 82.
