= Saskia Kosterink =

Dutch softball player and coach (born 1984)

Saskia Kosterink (born August 13, 1984 in Zwolle) is a Dutch softball coach and former player who played for the Dutch national team in international competitions in 151 games. She became the head coach of the Dutch softball team in 2024, beginning with the 2024 European Championships in Utrecht.

Kosterink played for Run '71 Oldenzaal, Tex Town Tigers, Gulf Coast Community College, and Sparks Haarlem. She was a right-handed outfielder. She began playing for the Dutch national team in 2005. In 2007, she hit the most home runs in the Dutch Softball Hoofdklasse and during the European Championships that year she was named as Best Outfielder of the tournament. She was part of the Dutch team for the 2008 Summer Olympics in Beijing. She later played on teams in Italy and Australia.

Kosterink retired from playing softball in 2015 and joined the staff of the Dutch softball team in 2017. She was the head coach for the Dutch team in the U-18 Women's Softball World Cup in 2021, where the team finished seventh out of eight teams. She also coached the Dutch in the 2022 European Championship.
