= Nathalie Timmermans =

Dutch softball player (born 1989)

Nathalie Timmermans (born July 21, 1989, in Oldenzaal, Overijssel) is a Dutch softball player, who represents the Dutch national team in international competitions.

Timmermans played for Run '71 Oldenzaal, Tex Town Tigers, and Sparks Haarlem. She is a catcher and third baseman who bats and throws right-handed and has competed for the Dutch national team since 2007, the year she was named the best batter of the Dutch Softball Hoofdklasse. In 2008, she was on the Dutch team for the Beijing Summer Olympics.
