= Alette Sijbring =

Dutch water polo player (born 1982)

Personal information
- Born: 20 March 1982 (age 44) Zierikzee, Netherlands
Medal record
Women's water polo
Representing the Netherlands
Olympic Games
Gold medal – first place	2008 Beijing	Team competition

Alette Sijbring (born 20 March 1982) is a water polo player of the Netherlands who represents the Dutch national team in international competitions.

Sijbring was part of the team that finished fifth at the 2001 Women's European Water Polo Championship in Budapest and 9th at the 2001 FINA Women's World Water Polo Championship in Fukuoka. After that she was also selected for the team that became 10th at the 2005 World Aquatics Championships in Montreal. At the 2006 FINA Women's Water Polo World League in Cosenza and the 2006 Women's European Water Polo Championship in Belgrade they finished in fifth place, followed by the 9th spot at the 2007 World Aquatics Championships in Melbourne. The Dutch team finished in fifth place at the 2008 Women's European Water Polo Championship in Málaga and they qualified for the 2008 Summer Olympics in Beijing. There they ended up winning the gold medal on 21 August, beating the United States 9–8 in the final.

== See also ==
- Netherlands women's Olympic water polo team records and statistics
- List of Olympic champions in women's water polo
- List of Olympic medalists in water polo (women)
- List of World Aquatics Championships medalists in water polo
