= Petra van Heijst =

Dutch softball player (born 1984)

Petra van Heijst (born 31 December 1984 in Enschede) is a Dutch softball player, who represents the Dutch national team in international competitions. Her brother Frank is a baseball player in the Dutch Hoofdklasse.

Van Heijst played for Tex Town Tigers, Amsterdam Pirates and since 2005 for Terrasvogels. She is a shortstop, second baseman and outfielder who bats and throws right-handed. She competes for the Dutch national team since 2004. In 2007 she was named MVP of the Dutch Softball Hoofdklasse. She is part of the Dutch team for the 2008 Summer Olympics in Beijing.
