= Kim Kluijskens =

Dutch softball player (born 1984)

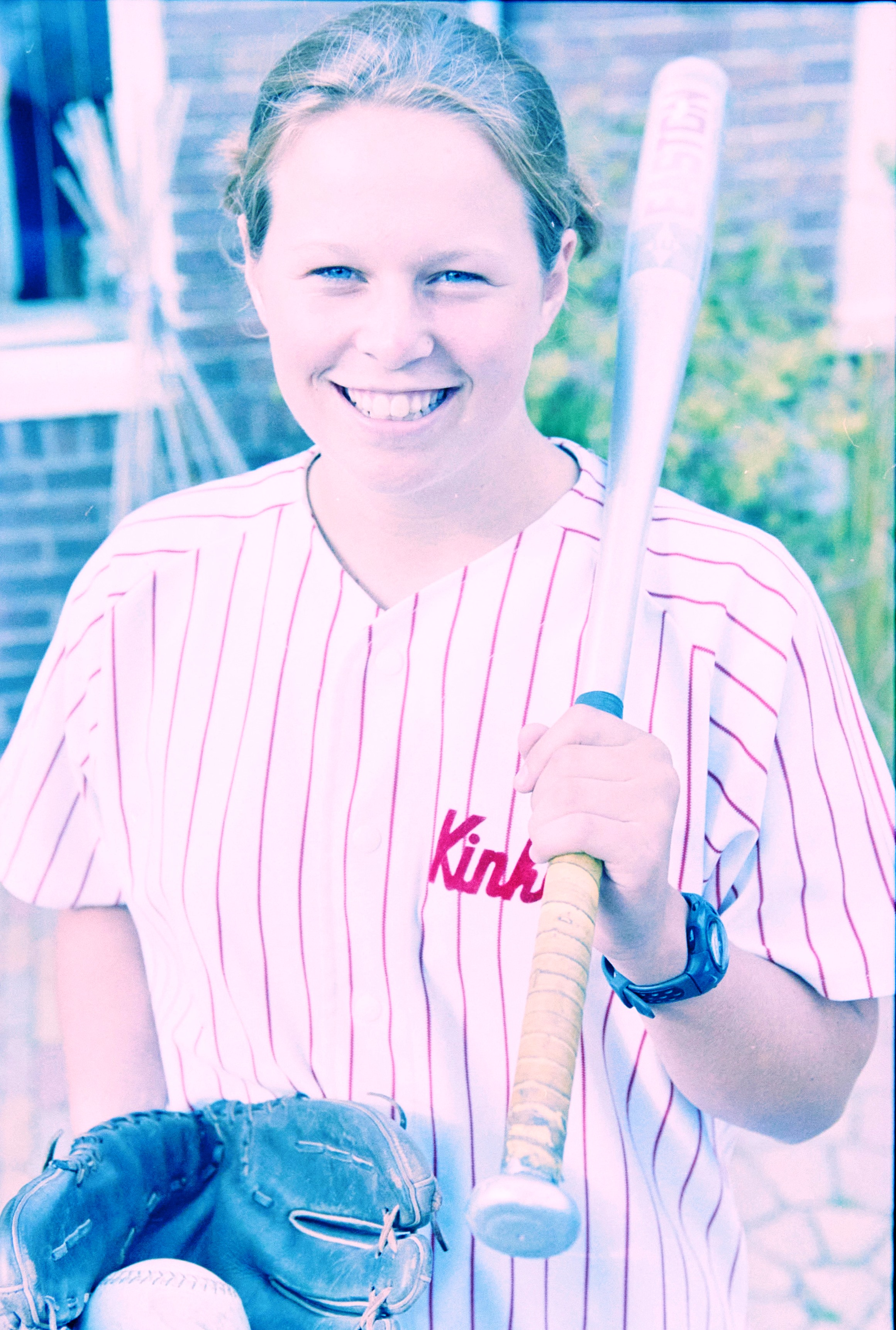
Kluijskens (1999)

Kim Kluijskens (born 9 June 1984 in IJmuiden) is a Dutch softball player, who represents the Dutch national team in international competitions.

Kluijskens played for De Pino's, Kinheim and since 2001 for Sparks Haarlem. She is a first baseman who bats and throws left-handed. She competes for the Dutch national team since 2001. She is part of the Dutch team for the 2008 Summer Olympics in Beijing.
