= Tjerk Smeets =

Dutch baseball player (born 1980)

- Catcher
- Born: 3 June 1980 (age 46); Amsterdam, Netherlands
- Bats: Right Throws: Right
- Stats at Baseball Reference
Medals
Men's baseball
Representing Netherlands
Intercontinental Cup
Silver medal – second place	2006 Taiwan	National team
European Baseball Championship
Gold medal – first place	2005 Czech Republic	National team
Gold medal – first place	2007 Spain	National team

Tjerk Marten Smeets (born 3 June 1980) is a Dutch former baseball catcher who played for the Netherlands national team in the 2008 Summer Olympics and other international competitions as well as the Honkbal Hoofdclasse. He was the technical director of the Royal Netherlands Baseball and Softball Federation (KNBSB) and technical manager of football club AFC Ajax.

== Playing career ==
Smeets played his college baseball for the Middle Tennessee Blue Raiders in the United States. In 1999, he was 1-for-2 with one run batted in (RBI). In 2000, he hit a home run in his only at bat and drew two walks. In 2001, he hit for a .159/.256/.304 slash line with three home runs in 30 games.

Smeets first played for the Dutch national team in the 2003 World Port Tournament, going 1-for-2 with a two-run home run. Because there were only two home runs in the tournament, he won the Home Run King award.

In 2005, he hit .326 for the Amsterdam Pirates to finish sixth in the Hoofdklasse in batting average. He tied for third with three homers, trailing Ivanon Coffie and Dirk van 't Klooster. He played for the Netherlands in the 2005 European Baseball Championship.

Smeets moved to Kinheim in 2006 and batted .349/.446/.454 with 36 RBI in 41 games and fielded .996 at catcher. He was 7th in average, 6th in slugging, third in OBP (behind Eugene Kingsale and Sidney de Jong), tied Reily Legito for the RBI lead, was third with 13 doubles (behind Yuki Nerei and Fausto Álvarez), tied Kingsale, Roel Koolen and Evert-Jan 't Hoen for 5th with 27 walks and tied Nerei for 5th with 53 hits. Smeets hit .482 with runners in scoring position. He won the Hoofdklasse MVP award, the fourth catcher so honored. He was 2-for-12 in the playoffs but 9-for-21 with 3 walks and five runs in five games in the Holland Series as Kinheim won the title.

Smeets was 0-for-2 in the 2006 Haarlem Baseball Week. In the 2006 Intercontinental Cup, he was 1-for-4 with a walk and two runs for the silver medalists, backing up de Jong at catcher.

In the 2007 Hoofdklasse season, Smeets hit .294/.379/.531 with 36 runs and 43 RBI in 36 games and threw out 14 of 30 attempted base-stealers. Smeets was fourth in slugging percentage, second to Alvarez in home runs (with 7), tied with Benjamin Dille for fifth in runs (36), first in RBI (six ahead of Martijn Meeuwis) and tied for fourth in doubles (13). With Kinheim, Smeets batted .263/.391/.316 for Kinheim in the 2007 European Cup, its first European Cup title ever. In the championship game, Smeets was 1-for-5 with two walks and a timely hit by pitch. He hit .300 with a .391 OBP in the playoffs then batted .333/.333/.400 in the 2007 Holland Series. He scored their first run in their successful championship defense and had three hits in Game 1; in Game 2, he was thrown out trying to score in a key play, but Kinheim rallied to win.

Smeets was 2-for-8 for the national team in the 2007 World Port Tournament, striking out four times. In the 2007 Baseball World Cup, he was 3-for-6 with a homer, playing in two of the team's 10 games. Smeets batted .421/.476/.526 to help Kinheim win the 2008 European Cup in Grosseto. His 7 RBI tied for the lead. He had the big hit of the competition: down 2–1 in the bottom of the 10th inning in the championship game, Smeets doubled in René Cremer and Dirk van 't Klooster with a shot off of Lincoln Mikkelsen. Smeets had fouled off several pitches before the double.

Smeets played for the Netherlands at the 2008 Summer Olympics in Beijing. He went hitless in four at bat over three games.

== Post-playing career ==
Smeets retired from Kinheim after the 2010 season. In 2011, he became the manager of Dutch club RCH-Pinguins in Heemstede. During this time, he also worked as a marketing manager for the KNBSB.

In October 2013, he became the technical manager of football team AFC Ajax. In 2017, he became the technical director of the KNBSB. He stepped down from that role in 2021. He has also been a coach for the Netherlands national team at the 2011 Baseball World Cup, 2013 World Baseball Classic (WBC), and 2023 WBC.

== Personal life ==
During the closing ceremony of the 2008 Summer Olympics, Smeets proposed to his girlfriend, Dutch field hockey gold medalist, Minke Smabers, who accepted. They has two sons. His wife was teammates with her sister, Hanneke Smabers, when the Dutch won the bronze medal in the 2000 Summer Olympics.

Smeets is the son of Dutch radio and television personality, writer, and columnist Mart Smeets.

Smeets attended high school at Fons Vitae Lyceum in Amsterdam. He attended Middle Tennessee State University due to his friendship with the school's basketball coach, former Dutch national basketball team coach Randy Wiel.
