= Tom van den Broek =

Dutch rower (born 1980)

Personal information
- Born: 28 August 1980 (age 45)

Sport
- Sport: Rowing
Medal record
Men's rowing
Representing the Netherlands
World Rowing Championships
| Gold medal – first place | 2007 Munich | Lwt eight |

Tom van den Broek (born 28 August 1980) is a Dutch lightweight rower. He won a gold medal at the 2007 World Rowing Championships in Munich with the lightweight men's eight.
