= Alwin Snijders =

Dutch rower

Personal information
- Born: 21 November 1977 (age 48)

Sport
- Sport: Rowing
Medal record
Men's rowing
Representing the Netherlands
World Rowing Championships
Gold medal – first place	2007 Munich	Lwt eight

Alwin Snijders (born 21 November 1977) is a Dutch lightweight rower. He won a gold medal at the 2007 World Rowing Championships in Munich with the lightweight men's eight.
