= Martijn Meeuwis =

Dutch baseball player (born 1982)

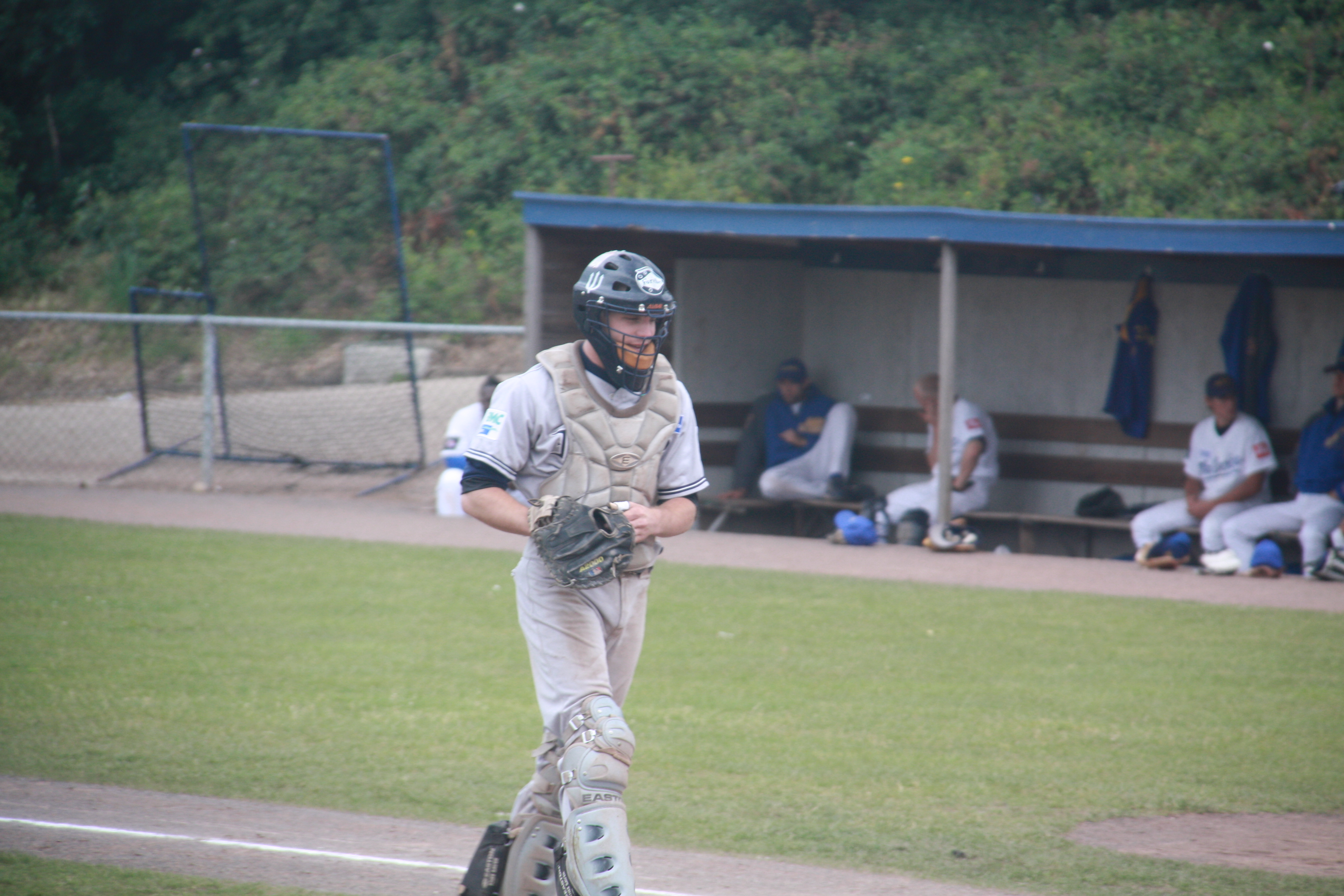
- Meeuwis with Neptunus in 2009
- Catcher / Outfielder
- Born: July 14, 1982 (age 44); Moergestel, Netherlands
- Bats: Right Throws: Right

Martijn Meeuwis (born July 14, 1982) is a Dutch former professional baseball player who played for the Netherlands national team in the 2008 Summer Olympics and other international tournaments. He also played in the Honkbal Hoofdklasse.

Meeuwis began playing baseball as a six-year-old with Roef in Moergestel. He switched clubs to Twins Oosterhout at age 11. He debuted in the Hoofdklasse with the Twins in 1999 as a teenager. After Twins was relegated, he did not return to the Hoofdklasse again until the club was promoted for the 2004 season, when he was a full-time player. When Oosterhout was relegated after the season, Meeuwis moved to HCAW. In 2005, he had a .184/.266/.233 slash line as a regular outfielder. In 2006, he was the club's regular center fielder. He hit .304 and led the league with five triples.

For 2007, Meeuwis moved to Neptunus to return to his preferred position of catcher, and his offense improved. He hit .301/.394/.500 with 37 RBI in 39 games. He threw out 19 of 35 would-be base-stealers. He was seventh in the Hoofdklasse in batting average, third in home runs (6) and second in runs batted in (RBI) (six behind leader Tjerk Smeets). He was one of the three finalists for the league most valuable player award along with Cuban Fausto Álvarez and Danny Rombley. Álvarez won.

Meeuwis joined the Dutch national team in May 2007 when Neptunus teammate Johnny Balentina, another catcher/outfielder, was injured. Meeuwis was part of the team's visit to the United States, which included games against the U.S. collegiate national team. He played in the 2007 World Port Tournament, going 1-for-6 and playing in center field. Balentina was back with the team for the 2007 European Baseball Championship, but Meeuwis replaced him once more for the 2007 Baseball World Cup. He was 3-for-10 with two walks and a double in the World Cup, helping fill in for center fielder Roger Bernadina. Meeuwis had a key role in the Dutch win over host Chinese Taipei in the quarterfinals. En-Yu Lin had retired 13 consecutive batters, and the Taiwanese team held a 2–0 lead when Meeuwis walked and came around to score on a hit by Reily Legito. Greg Halman later replaced Meeuwis in center in that game.

Meeuwis hit .231/.375/.231 for Neptunus in the 2008 European Cup in Regensburg, Germany.

Manager Robert Eenhoorn selected Meeuwis for the Netherlands team at the 2008 Summer Olympics in Beijing. As a bench player, he batted 1-for-2 as the Dutch finished seventh in the Olympics.

Meeuwis hit .364 in the 2009 World Port Tournamentwith two extra base hits and four RBI in eight games.

Meeuwis played for Neptunus through 2010. He withdrew from the national team that January and left Neptunus after the season, citing outside work commitments, to play for Twins in the lower Overgangsklasse.
