= Roeland Lievens =

Dutch rower

Personal information
- Born: 1 July 1983 (age 43) Oostburg, Netherlands

Sport
- Sport: Rowing

Roeland Lievens (born 1 July 1983) is a Dutch rower. He competed in the Men's lightweight coxless four event at the 2012 Summer Olympics.
