= Wolter Blankert =

Dutch rower (born 1978)

Personal information
- Born: 10 September 1978 (age 47)

Sport
- Sport: Rowing
Medal record
Men's rowing
Representing the Netherlands
World Rowing Championships
Gold medal – first place	2007 Munich	Lwt eight
Bronze medal – third place	2002 Seville	Lwt quad scull

Wolter Blankert (born 10 September 1978) is a Dutch lightweight rower. He won a gold medal at the 2007 World Rowing Championships in Munich with the lightweight men's eight.
