= Arnoud Greidanus =

Dutch rower

Personal information
- Born: 1 June 1981 (age 45)

Sport
- Sport: Rowing
Medal record
Men's rowing
Representing the Netherlands
World Rowing Championships
| Gold medal – first place | 2007 Munich | Lwt eight |
| Silver medal – second place | 2012 Plovdiv | Lwt pair |

Arnoud Greidanus (born 1 June 1981) is a Dutch lightweight rower. He won a gold medal at the 2007 World Rowing Championships in Munich with the lightweight men's eight. In 2012 he won a silver medal at the 2012 World Rowing Championships in Plovdiv with the lightweight men's pair, together with Joris Pijs.
